= 1999–2000 Persepolis F.C. season =

Persepolis
1999–2000 season
- Chairman: Amir Abedini
- Manager: Ali Parvin
- Stadium: Azadi Stadium
- Azadegan League: Winners
- Hazfi Cup: Withdrew
- Asian Club Championship: 3rd place
- Top goalscorer: League: B. Seraj (11 goals); All: M. Hasheminasab (12 goals)
- Highest home attendance: 100,000 (against Esteghlal)
Home colours	Away colours

The 1999–2000 season was the Persepolis's 9th season in the Azadegan League, and their 17th consecutive season in the top division of Iranian Football. They were also competing in the Hazfi Cup and Asian Club Championship. Persepolis was captained by Hossein Abdi.

== Squad ==
Note: Flags indicate national team as defined under FIFA eligibility rules; some limited exceptions apply. Players may hold more than one non-FIFA nationality.

No.	Pos.	Nation	Player
1	GK	IRI	Ahmad Reza Abedzadeh (vice captain)
4	DF	IRI	Ali Ansarian
5	DF	IRI	Afshin Peyrovani
6	DF	IRI	Behrouz Rahbarifard
7	MF	IRI	Hamid Estili
8	DF	IRI	Mehdi Hasheminasab
9	FW	IRI	Behnam Seraj
10	FW	IRI	Edmond Bezik
11	MF	IRI	Hamed Kavianpour
12	MF	IRI	Hossein Abdi (captain)
13	MF	IRI	Ebrahim Asadi
14	DF	IRI	Nader Mohammadkhani (3rd captain)
15	MF	IRI	Esmaeil Halali

No.	Pos.	Nation	Player
16	DF	IRI	Reza Shahroudi
17	MF	IRI	Hadi Mahdavikia
18	DF	IRI	Mohammad Barzegar
19	FW	IRI	Payan Rafat
20	FW	IRI	Ali Baghmisheh
21	FW	IRI	Kourosh Barmak
22	GK	IRI	Davoud Fanaei
23	MF	IRI	Alireza Emamifar
24	MF	IRI	Mehdi Tartar
26	MF	IRI	Ali Karimi
30	GK	IRI	Mojtaba Rezaei
—	GK	IRI	Mehdi Mostafazadeh

== Mid-season Transfers ==
=== In ===
No	P	Name	Age	Moving from	Transfer fee	Type	Source
16	LB	Reza Shahroudi	27	(China) Dalian Shide	–	Loan Return	

== Technical staff ==
Position	Staff
Head coach	(Iran) Ali Parvin
Assistant coach	(Iran) Nasser Ebrahimi
Physical fitness trainer	(Iran) Parviz Komasi
Goalkeeping coach	(Iran) Vahid Ghelich
Doctor	(Iran) Dr. Farid Zarineh
Team Manager	(Iran) Mahmoud Khordbin

== Competitions ==
=== Overview ===
Competition	Started round	Current position / round	Final position / round	First match	Last match
1999–2000 Azadegan League	—	—	Winners	August 18, 1999	May 25, 2000
1999–2000 Hazfi Cup	Round of 32	—	Withdrew	December 7, 2000	December 13, 2000
1999–2000 Asian Club Championship	—	—	Third-place		April 22, 2000

=== Azadegan League ===
==== Standings ====
Pos	Team	Pld	W	D	L	GF	GA	GD	Pts	Qualification or relegation
1	Persepolis (C)	26	15	9	2	45	23	+22	54	Qualification for the 2000–01 Asian Club Championship
2	Esteghlal	26	12	11	3	32	16	+16	47	Qualification for the 2000–01 Asian Cup Winners' Cup
3	Fajr Sepasi	26	11	11	4	37	18	+19	44	
4	Sepahan	26	11	9	6	28	19	+9	42	
5	Zob Ahan	26	11	6	9	35	29	+6	39	

Updated to match(es) played on 1 September 2018. Source: RSSSF
Rules for classification: 1) Points; 2) Goal difference; 3) Goals scored.
(C) Champions

==== Matches ====
Win Draw Loss Postponed

18 August 1999 1	Persepolis	3 – 1	Bahman	Tehran
	Bezik; Hasheminasab (pen.); Kavianpour			Stadium: Azadi Stadium

22 August 1999 2	Irsotter Noshahr	1 – 5	Persepolis	Noshahr
	Tahmasebi		Mahdavikia; Hasheminasab; Rafat; Seraj	Stadium: Shohadaye Noshahr Stadium

26 August 1999 3	Persepolis	2 – 1	Sanat Naft	Tehran
	Seraj		Sharifinasab	Stadium: Azadi Stadium

12 September 1999 4	Zob Ahan	1 – 1	Persepolis	Fuladshahr
	Garousi		Rafat	Stadium: Foolad Shahr Stadium

24 September 1999 5	Persepolis	0 – 0	Esteghlal	Tehran
	Mohammadkhani (red card) 47'; Halali (yellow card) 30' (red card)			Stadium: Azadi Stadium

28 September 1999 6	Persepolis	3 – 1	Fajr Sepasi	Tehran
	Emamifar; Hasheminasab		Rezaei	Stadium: Takhti Stadium

2 October 1999 7	Aboomoslem	1 – 2	Persepolis	Mashhad
	Mosalla		Bezik; Emamifar	Stadium: Takhti Stadium

7 October 1999 8	Tractor	1 – 1	Persepolis	Tabriz
	Peyrovani , 62' (o.g.)		Baghmisheh 88'	Stadium: Takhti Stadium

15 October 1999 9	Persepolis	2 – 1	Saipa	Tehran
	Estili 14'; Emamifar 28'		akbari (pen.), 75'	Stadium: Azadi Stadium

28 October 1999 10	Persepolis	3 – 0	Chooka	Tehran
	Rafat 65' 71'; Estili 83'			Stadium: Azadi Stadium

14 November 1999 11	Foolad	1 – 2	Persepolis	Ahvaz
	Zahedi 19' (pen.)		Hasheminasab 69'; Seraj 75'	Stadium: Takhti Stadium

20 November 1999 12	Sepahan	0 – 0	Persepolis	Isfahan

25 November 1999 13	Persepolis	3 – 1	Pas	Tehran
	Rafat 78'; Estili 87'; Hasheminasab 90+1'		Heydari 15'; Nekounam (penalty missed)	Stadium: Azadi Stadium

25 January 2000 14	Bahman	1 – 1	Persepolis	Tehran
	Mikaeili 84'		Hasheminasab 63'	Stadium: Azadi Stadium

23 February 2000 15	Fajr Sepasi	1 – 1	Persepolis	Shiraz
	Samereh 10'		Seraj 87'	Stadium: Hafezieh Stadium

27 February 2000 16	Esteghlal	0 – 2	Persepolis	Tehran
			Hasheminasab 8'; Rafat 81'	Stadium: Azadi Stadium

4 March 2000 17	Persepolis	1 – 1	Aboomoslem	Tehran
	Hasheminasab 89' (pen.)		Ebrahimi 90+2'	Stadium: Azadi Stadium

9 March 2000 18	Persepolis	5 – 2	Tractor	Tehran
	Bezik 37' 48'; Karimi 65'; Seraj 78'; Hasheminasab 82' (pen.)		Tavakoli 15'; Rostami 45+1'	Stadium: Azadi Stadium

13 March 2000 19	Saipa	0 – 0	Persepolis	Tehran
				Stadium: Azadi Stadium

28 April 2000 20	Persepolis	1 – 0	Sepahan	Tehran
	Seraj 31'			Stadium: Azadi Stadium

2 May 2000 21	Persepolis	2 – 0	Irsotter Noshahr	Tehran
	Seraj 33' 40'			Stadium: Azadi Stadium

7 May 2000 22	Chooka	1 – 2	Persepolis	Talesh
	Taghizadeh 65' (pen.)		Hasheminasab 42' (pen.); Halali 75'	Stadium: Pouria Vali Stadium

12 May 2000 23	Pas	0 – 1	Persepolis	Tehran
	Khatibi (penalty missed)		Seraj 47'	Stadium: Azadi Stadium

16 May 2000 24	Sanat Naft	3 – 0	Persepolis	Abadan
	Mohannad Mahdi 33' 80'; Sharifinasab 75'			Stadium: Takhti Stadium

21 May 2000 25	Persepolis	2 – 2	Foolad	Tehran
	Karimi 18' 77' (pen.)		Jenabi 44'; Saadavi 53'	Stadium: Azadi Stadium

25 May 2000 26	Persepolis	0 – 2	Zob Ahan	Tehran
			Norouzi 77'; Rezaei 87'	Stadium: Azadi Stadium

==== Score overview ====
Win Draw Loss

Opposition	Home score	Away score	Aggregate score
Aboomoslem	1–1	1–2	3–2
Bahman	3–1	1–1	4–2
Chooka	3–0	1–2	5–1
Esteghlal	0–0	0–2	2–0
Fajr Sepasi	3–1	1–1	4–2
Foolad	2–2	1–2	4–3
Irsotter Noshahr	2–0	1–5	7–1
PAS	3–1	0–1	4–1
Saipa	2–1	0–0	2–1
Sanat Naft	2–1	3–0	2–4
Sepahan	1–0	0–0	1–0
Tractor	5–2	1–1	6–2
Zob Ahan	0–2	1–1	1–3

=== Hazfi Cup ===
Round of 32

7 December 1999 First leg	Adonis Mashhad	0 – 1	Persepolis	Mashhad
			Baghmisheh (pen.), 58'	Stadium: Takhti Stadium

13 December 1999 Second leg	Persepolis	3 – 1 (4 – 1 agg.)	Adonis Mashhad	Tehran
	Rahbarifar (pen.), 28'; Baghmisheh 55'; Barmak 84'		Enayati 17'	Stadium: Takhti Stadium

- Persepolis withdrew after this round.

=== Asian Club Championship ===
==== Second round ====
22 October 1999 First leg	Persepolis (Iran)	3 – 0	(Lebanon) Al Ansar	Tehran, Iran
	Hasheminasab; Bezik; Baghmisheh			Stadium: Azadi Stadium

7 November 1999 Second leg	Al Ansar (Lebanon)	0 – 0 (0 – 3 agg.)	(Iran) Persepolis	Beirut, Lebanon
				Stadium: Beirut municipality Stadium

==== Quarterfinals ====
===== West Asia =====
Team	Pld	W	D	L	GF	GA	GD	Pts
(Saudi Arabia) Al-Hilal	3	2	1	0	3	0	+3	7
(Iran) Persepolis	3	1	2	0	1	0	+1	5
(Iraq) Al-Shorta	3	1	1	1	3	3	0	4
(Kazakhstan) FC Irtysh	3	0	0	3	2	6	−4	0

7 February 2000 1	Persepolis (Iran)	0 – 0	(Iraq) Al-Shorta	Riyadh, Saudi Arabia
				Stadium: Fahd International Stadium

9 February 2000 2	Persepolis (Iran)	1 – 0	(Kazakhstan) FC Irtysh	Riyadh, Saudi Arabia
	Hasheminasab 78'			Stadium: Fahd International Stadium

11 February 2000 3	Al-Hilal (Saudi Arabia)	0 – 0	(Iran) Persepolis	Riyadh, Saudi Arabia
				Stadium: Fahd International Stadium

==== Semifinals ====
20 April 2000	Júbilo Iwata (Japan)	2 – 0	(Iran) Persepolis	Riyadh, Saudi Arabia
	Takahara 67'; Nakayama 90'			Stadium: Fahd International Stadium

==== Third place match ====
22 April 2000	Persepolis (Iran)	1 – 0	(South Korea) Suwon Samsung Bluewings	Riyadh, Saudi Arabia
	Karimi 75'			Stadium: Fahd International Stadium

== Scorers ==
No.	Pos	Nat	Name	League	Hazfi Cup	Asian	Total
8	CB	(Iran)	Mehdi Hasheminasab	10	0	2	12
9	CF	(Iran)	Behnam Seraj	11	0	0	11
19	CF	(Iran)	Payan Rafat	6	0	0	6
10	CF	(Iran)	Edmond Bezik	4	0	1	5
26	AM	(Iran)	Ali Karimi	3	0	1	4
23	RM	(Iran)	Alireza Emamifar	4	0	0	4
20	CF	(Iran)	Ali Baghmisheh	1	2	1	4
7	CM	(Iran)	Hamid Estili	3	0	0	3
11	CM	(Iran)	Hamed Kavianpour	1	0	0	1
17	RM	(Iran)	Hadi Mahdavikia	1	0	0	1
15	CM	(Iran)	Esmail Halali	1	0	0	1
6	CB	(Iran)	Behrouz Rahbarifar	0	1	0	1
21	CF	(Iran)	Kourosh Barmak	0	1	0	1
Totals				45	4	5	54

=== Goalkeeping ===
			League			Hazfi			Asian			Total		
No	N	Name	M	GA	CS	M	GA	CS	M	GA	CS	M	GA	CS
22	(Iran)	Davoud Fanaei	16	15	5	1	1	0	3	0	3	20	16	8
1	(Iran)	Ahmad Reza Abedzadeh	9	7	3	–	–	–	4	2	3	13	9	6
	(Iran)	Mehdi Mosatafazadeh	–	–	–	1	0	1	–	–	–	1	0	1
30	(Iran)	Mojtaba Rezaei	1	1	0	–	–	–	–	–	–	1	1	0
Total			26	23	8	2	1	1	7	2	6	35	26	15
Last updated: 31 August 2020
