= 1998–99 Persepolis F.C. season =

Persepolis
1998–99 season
- Chairman: Amir Abedini
- Manager: Ivica Matković (until Oct. 2, 1998); Ali Parvin (from Oct. 3, 1998)
- Stadium: Azadi Stadium
- Azadegan League: Winners
- Hazfi Cup: Winners
- Top goalscorer: League: E. Bezik (11 goals); All: E. Bezik (14 goals)
- Highest home attendance: 100,000 (11 July 1999 against Esteghlal)
Home colours	Away colours

The 1998–99 season was the Persepolis's 8th season in the Azadegan League, and their 16th consecutive season in the top division of Iranian Football. They were also competing in the Hazfi Cup. Persepolis was captained by Hossein Abdi.

== Squad ==
Note: Flags indicate national team as defined under FIFA eligibility rules; some limited exceptions apply. Players may hold more than one non-FIFA nationality.

No.	Pos.	Nation	Player
1	GK	IRI	Ahmad Reza Abedzadeh (vice captain)
2	DF	IRI	Yahya Golmohammadi
3	DF	IRI	Naeem Saadavi
4	DF	IRI	Behrouz Rahbarifard
5	DF	IRI	Afshin Peyrovani
6	DF	IRI	Mehdi Hasheminasab
7	MF	IRI	Hamid Estili
8	MF	IRI	Shahram Baratpouri
9	FW	IRI	Behnam Seraj
10	FW	IRI	Edmond Bezik
11	MF	IRI	Hamed Kavianpour
12	MF	IRI	Hossein Abdi (captain)
13	GK	IRI	Davoud Fanaei
14	DF	IRI	Nader Mohammadkhani (3rd captain)
15	MF	IRI	Esmaeil Halali

No.	Pos.	Nation	Player
18	DF	IRI	Ali Ansarian
19	FW	IRI	Payan Rafat
20	FW	IRI	Ali Baghmisheh
22	MF	IRI	Hadi Mahdavikia
23	MF	IRI	Alireza Emamifar
24	DF	IRI	Ali Mafinejad
25	MF	IRI	Hamid Motahari
26	MF	IRI	Ali Karimi
27	DF	IRI	Jahanbakhsh Jafari
30	GK	IRI	Mojtaba Rezaei
33	MF	IRI	Payam Porankouh
—	FW	IRI	Kourosh Barmak

== Transfers ==
=== In ===
No	P	Name	Age	Moving from	Transfer fee	Type	Transfer window	Source
	RM	Pejman Jamshidi	20	Keshavarz	€4300	Free Transfer	Summer	
26	AM	Ali Karimi	19	Fath Tehran	–	Transfer	Summer	
7	CM	Hamid Estili	31	Bahman	–	Free Transfer	Summer	
9	CF	Behnam Seraj	26	Sanat Naft	–	Free Transfer	Summer	
22	RM	Hadi Mahdavikia	19	Bank Melli	–	Free Transfer	Summer	
13	GK	Davoud Fanaei	23	Polyacryl	–	Free Transfer	Summer	
14	CB	Nader Mohammadkhani	34	Polyacryl	–	Free Transfer	Summer	
20	CF	Ali Baghmisheh	24	Tractor	–	Free Transfer	Summer	
27	DM	Jahanbakhsh Jafari	22	Pars Khodro	–	Free Transfer	Summer	
30	GK	Mojtaba Rezaei	21	Unknown	–	Free Transfer	Summer	
8	LB	Shahram Baratpouri	23	Foolad	–	Free Transfer	Winter	
18	CB	Ali Ansarian	21	Fajr Sepasi	–	Free Transfer	Winter	
19	CF	Payan Rafat	28	Malavan	–	Free Transfer	Winter	
	CF	Kourosh Barmak		Tractor	–	Free Transfer	Winter	

=== Out ===
No	P	Name	Age	Moving to	Transfer fee	Type	Transfer window	Source
25	LB	Mehrdad Minavand	22	(Austria) Sturm Graz	€1,150,000	Transfer	Summer	
	RM	Pejman Jamshidi	20	Saipa	–	Free Transfer	Summer	
	CF	Bahram Esmaeili	17	PAS	–	Free Transfer	Summer	
	CF	Behnam Taherzadeh	23	(Slovenia) NK Celje	–	Free Transfer	Summer	
	GK	Alireza Delikhon	28	Tractor	–	Free Transfer	Summer	
24	RB	Davoud Mahboub		Fajr Sepasi	–	Free Transfer	Summer	
	CM	Mohsen Ashouri	33	Retired				
	LW	Mahmoud Kalhor	31	Retired				
	GK	Kourosh Shahbazifar	37	Retired				
	GK	Ali Zadali Hassan		Retired				
17	RW	Mehdi Mahdavikia	21	(Germany) VfL Bochum		Loan transfer	Winter	
	GK	Nima Nakisa	23	(Greece) Kavala	–	Free Transfer	winter	
29	RB	Mohsen Ranjbaran		Fajr Sepasi	–	Free Transfer	Winter	
	LW	Reza Torabian	28	(Belgium) Standard Liège	–	Free Transfer	Winter	

== Technical staff ==
Position	Staff
Head coach	(Iran) Ali Parvin
Assistant coach	(Iran) Nasser Ebrahimi
Physical fitness trainer	(Iran) Parviz Komasi
Goalkeeping coach	(Iran) Vahid Ghelich
Doctor	(Iran) Dr. Farid Zarineh
Team Manager	(Iran) Mahmoud Khordbin

== Competitions ==
=== Overview ===
Competition	Started round	Current position / round	Final position / round	First match	Last match
1998–99 Azadegan League	—	—	Winners	September 13, 1998	May 22, 1999
1998–99 Hazfi Cup	Round of 32	—	Winners	December 14, 1998	July 11, 1999

=== Azadegan League ===
==== Standings ====
Pos	Team	Pld	W	D	L	GF	GA	GD	Pts	Qualification or relegation
1	Persepolis (C)	30	19	8	3	56	21	+35	65	Qualification for the 1999–2000 Asian Club Championship
2	Esteghlal	30	14	11	5	50	28	+22	53	Qualification for the 1999–2000 Asian Cup Winners' Cup
3	Sepahan	30	13	14	3	38	19	+19	53	
4	Saipa	30	13	10	7	43	33	+10	49	
5	PAS	30	9	15	6	30	25	+5	42	

Updated to match(es) played on 1 Sep 2018. Source: RSSSF
Rules for classification: 1) Points; 2) Goal difference; 3) Goals scored.
(C) Champions

==== Matches ====
Win Draw Loss Postponed

13 September 1998 1	Persepolis	3–0	Polyacryl	Tehran
	M. Mahdavikia 47', 76'; Abedzadeh 85' (pen.)		Seyed Mirzaei (red card) 40'	Stadium: Azadi Stadium; Attendance: 40,000; Referee: Siamak Bakhshi

21 September 1998 2	Chooka	3–1	Persepolis	Talesh
	Daneshvar 34'; Feyzi Moghaddam 41'; Amin 44'		Emamifar 22'	Stadium: Pouria Vali Stadium; Attendance: 15,000; Referee: Yadollah Soleimani

27 September 1998 3	Persepolis	0–0	Fajr Sepasi	Tehran
				Stadium: Azadi Stadium; Attendance: 60,000; Referee: Ahmad Abharan

2 October 1998 4	Persepolis	1–0	Saipa	Tehran
	Karimi 25'			Stadium: Azadi Stadium; Attendance: 50,000; Referee: Hossein Asgari

9 October 1998 5	Sepahan	1–0	Persepolis	Isfahan
	Stepanyan 59'			Stadium: 22 Bahman Stadium; Attendance: 50,000; Referee: Alireza Sadeghijoo

16 October 1998 6	Persepolis	1–0	Foolad	Tehran
	Seraj 33'			Stadium: Azadi Stadium; Attendance: 35,000; Referee: Jalal Moradi

22 October 1998 7	Sanat Naft	1–4	Persepolis	Abadan
	Roueintan 67'		Mohammadkhani 34'; Seraj 51'; Emamifar 63'; H. Mahdavikia 73'	Stadium: Takhti Stadium; Attendance: 25,000; Referee: Yadollah Soleimani

8 November 1998 9	Persepolis	1–0	Malavan	Tehran
	Mohammadkhani 75'		Sayyad (red card) 85'	Stadium: Azadi Stadium; Attendance: 40,000; Referee: Farajollah Yasrebi

13 November 1998 10	Esteghlal	0–1	Persepolis	Tehran
	Mousavi (yellow card) (yellow-red card) 67'		Hasheminasab 45+1'; Estili (yellow card) (yellow-red card) 47'	Stadium: Azadi Stadium; Attendance: 100,000; Referee: (Syria) Mahmoud Al-Rifai

1 January 1999 8	Pas	0–4	Persepolis	Tehran
			Seraj 12'; Shahroudi 42'; Baghmisheh 75'; Emamifar 88'	Stadium: Azadi Stadium; Attendance: 15,000; Referee: Ahmad Abharan

11 January 1999 11	Tractor	2–4	Persepolis	Tabriz
	Barmak 10' (pen.), 84' (pen.)		Halali 22' (pen.); Hasheminasab 42'; Karimi 52'; Estili 55'	Stadium: Takhti Stadium; Attendance: 25,000; Referee: Ali Khosravi

18 January 1999 12	Persepolis	2–0	Zob Ahan	Tehran
	Karimi 21'; Hasheminasab 31'			Stadium: Azadi Stadium; Attendance: 30,000; Referee: Mohammad Shojaei

23 January 1999 16	Polyacryl	0–2	Persepolis	Isfahan
			Estili 62'; Bezik 72'	Stadium: 22 Bahman Stadium; Attendance: 25,000; Referee: Hossein Asgari

29 January 1999 17	Persepolis	4–0	Chooka	Tehran
	Baratpouri 27'; Bezik 30'; Abdi 44'; Emamifar 61'			Stadium: Azadi Stadium; Attendance: 50,000; Referee: Rahim Rahimi Moghadam

5 February 1999 18	Fajr Sepasi	2–3	Persepolis	Shiraz
	Seyed-Abbasi 2'; Rezaei 65' (pen.)		Estili 5'; Bezik 28'; Halali 68'; Rahbarifar (red card) 71'	Stadium: Hafezieh Stadium; Attendance: 25,000; Referee: Ahmad Abharan

21 February 1999 20	Persepolis	3–1	Sepahan	Tehran
	Bezik 41', 85'; Estili 66'		Dehghani 19'	Stadium: Azadi Stadium; Attendance: 15,000; Referee: Siamak Bakhshi

27 February 1999 21	Foolad	0–3	Persepolis	Tehran
				Stadium: Azadi Stadium
Note: The disciplinary committee had banned Foolad from home matches because of their fans' behaviour, and Foolad had to go to opponent ground for their home matches. Foolad decided not to play this match and the match declared 3–0 in favor of Persepolis.

2 March 1999 13	Bank Melli	1–2	Persepolis	Tehran
	Najafi 21'		Bezik 9'; Emamifar 51'	Stadium: Azadi Stadium; Attendance: 10,000; Referee: Jalal Moradi

8 March 1999 22	Persepolis	4–1	Sanat Naft	Tehran
	Peyrovani 5', 12'; Rahbarifar 50'; Emamifar 76'		Khaziravi 86'	Stadium: Azadi Stadium; Attendance: 25,000; Referee: Hossein Asgari

12 March 1999 23	Persepolis	1–2	Pas	Tehran
	Bezik 75'		Hashemian 1'; Khatibi 55'	Stadium: Azadi Stadium; Attendance: 50,000; Referee: Hossein Asgari

19 March 1999 24	Malavan	1–1	Persepolis	Bandar-e Anzali
	Parnianfar 60' (pen.)		Bezik 55'	Stadium: Takhti Stadium

4 April 1999 14	Shahrdari Tabriz	0–0	Persepolis	Tabriz
				Stadium: Takhti Stadium; Attendance: 17,000; Referee: Saeed Bakhshizadeh

9 April 1999 25	Persepolis	1–1	Esteghlal	Tehran
	Hasheminasab 3'; Saadavi (yellow card) (yellow-red card) 90+1'		Malekian 45'; Taghavi (red card) 85'; Hassanzadeh (yellow card) (yellow-red card) 89'	Stadium: Azadi Stadium; Attendance: 100,000; Referee: (Saudi Arabia) Abdul Rahman Al-Zaid

13 April 1999 15	Persepolis	1–0	Aboomoslem	Tehran
	Hasheminasab 59'			Stadium: Takhti Stadium; Attendance: 20,000; Referee: Ahmad Abharan

18 April 1999 26	Persepolis	0–0	Tractor	Tehran
				Stadium: Takhti Stadium; Attendance: 20,000; Referee: Iraj Nazari

23 April 1999 27	Zob Ahan	1–1	Persepolis	Fuladshahr
	Sahebi 9'		Baghmisheh 61'	Stadium: Foolad Shahr Stadium

29 April 1999 28	Persepolis	1–1	Bank Melli	Tehran
	Bezik 38'; Halali (red card) 46'; Estili (yellow card) (yellow-red card) 49'		Najafi 11' (pen.)	Stadium: Takhti Stadium; Attendance: 15,000; Referee: Siamak Bakhshi

2 May 1999 19	Saipa	1–1	Persepolis	Tehran
	Shokrekhoda 13'		Ansarian 74'	Stadium: Azadi Stadium; Attendance: 15,000; Referee: Hossein Asgari

7 May 1999 29	Persepolis	4–1	Shahrdari Tabriz	Tehran
	Hasheminasab 6'; Seraj 12'; Estili (penalty missed) 44'; Emamifar 72'; Bezik 85'		Sangforoush 86'	Stadium: Azadi Stadium; Attendance: 20,000; Referee: Ali Khosravi

22 May 1999 30	Aboomoslem	1–2	Persepolis	Tehran
	Golcheshmeh 89'		Baghmisheh 30'; Bezik 70'	Stadium: Takhti Stadium
Note: The disciplinary committee had banned Aboomoslem from this home match because of their fans' behaviour and the match was held in Tehran.

==== Score overview ====
Win Draw Loss

Opposition	Home score	Away score	Aggregate score
Aboomoslem	1–0	1–2	3–1
Bank Melli	1–1	1–2	3–2
Chooka	4–0	3–1	5–3
Esteghlal	1–1	0–1	2–1
Fajr Sepasi	0–0	2–3	3–2
Foolad	1–0	0–3	4–1
Malavan	1–0	1–1	2–1
PAS	4–0	2–1	5–2
Polyacryl	3–0	0–2	5–0
Saipa	1–0	1–1	2–1
Sanat Naft	4–1	1–4	8–2
Sepahan	3–1	1–0	3–2
Shahrdari Tabriz	4–1	0–0	4–1
Tractor	0–0	2–4	4–2
Zob Ahan	2–0	1–1	3–1

=== Hazfi Cup ===
Round of 32

14 December 1998 First leg	Behpak Behshahr	0–2	Persepolis	Behshahr
			Seraj 26'; Rahbarifar 75'	Stadium: Azadi Stadium; Attendance: 10,000; Referee: Gholamali Hamirad

9 February 1999 Second leg	Persepolis	4–1 (6–1 agg.)	Behpak Behshahr	Tehran
	Seraj 40', 54'; Bezik 45+1' (pen.); Rahbarifar 60'		Nemati (pen.)	Stadium: Azadi Stadium; Attendance: 5,000; Referee: Masoud Moradi

Round of 16

30 March 1999 First leg	Polyacryl	0–2	Persepolis	Isfahan
			Rahbarifar 3'; Estili 37'	Stadium: 22 Bahman Stadium; Referee: Aboud Sangashekan

14 May 1999 Second leg	Persepolis	1–1 (3–1 agg.)	Polyacryl	Tehran
	Seraj 35'		Youzbashi 2'	Stadium: Azadi Stadium; Referee: Jalal Moradi

Quarterfinals

18 June 1999 First leg	Persepolis	2–2	Sepahan	Tehran
	Emamifar 70' (pen.); Halali 81'; Ansarian (red card) 79'		Veisi 39'; Basirat 80' (pen.)	Stadium: Azadi Stadium; Attendance: 40,000; Referee: Ali Khosravi

27 June 1999 Second leg	Sepahan	0–1 (2–3 agg.)	Persepolis	Isfahan
			Bezik 70'	Stadium: 22 Bahman Stadium; Attendance: 40,000; Referee: Hossein Asgari

Semifinals

2 July 1999 First leg	Esteghlal Ahvaz	0–2	Persepolis	Ahvaz
			Bezik 67'; Barmak 78'	Stadium: Takhti Stadium; Referee: Jalal Moradi

6 July 1999 Second leg	Persepolis	3–0 (5–0 agg.)	Esteghlal Ahvaz	Tehran
				Stadium: Azadi Stadium
Note: The match was not played because Esteghlal Ahvaz refused to do it.Football Federation declared the match 3–0 in favor of Persepolis.

Final

11 July 1999 Final	Persepolis	2–1	Esteghlal	Tehran
	Hasheminasab 12' (pen.); Peyrovani 86'		Bakhtiarizadeh 50'	Stadium: Azadi Stadium; Attendance: 100,000; Referee: (Syria) Mohammed Kusa

== Scorers ==
No.	Pos	Nat	Name	League	Hazfi Cup	Total
10	CF	(Iran)	Edmond Bezik	11	3	14
23	RM	(Iran)	Alireza Emamifar	7	1	8
9	CF	(Iran)	Behnam Seraj	4	4	8
6	CB	(Iran)	Mehdi Hasheminasab	6	1	7
7	CM	(Iran)	Hamid Estili	4	1	5
4	CB	(Iran)	Behrouz Rahbarifar	1	3	4
26	AM	(Iran)	Ali Karimi	3	0	3
20	CF	(Iran)	Ali Baghmisheh	3	0	3
15	CM	(Iran)	Esmaeil Halali	2	1	3
5	CB	(Iran)	Afshin Peyrovani	2	1	3
17	RW	(Iran)	Mehdi Mahdavikia	2	0	2
14	CB	(Iran)	Nader Mohammadkhani	2	0	2
1	GK	(Iran)	Ahmad Reza Abedzadeh	1	0	1
22	RM	(Iran)	Hadi Mahdavikia	1	0	1
16	LB	(Iran)	Reza Shahroudi	1	0	1
8	LM	(Iran)	Shahram Baratpouri	1	0	1
12	DM	(Iran)	Hossein Abdi	1	0	1
18	CB	(Iran)	Ali Ansarian	1	0	1
	CF	(Iran)	Kourosh Barmak	0	1	1
Others				3	3	6
Totals				56	19	75

=== Goalkeeping ===
			League			Hazfi Cup			Total		
No	N	Name	M	GA	CS	M	GA	CS	M	GA	CS
1	(Iran)	Ahmad Reza Abedzadeh	19	12	10	–	–	–	19	12	10
13	(Iran)	Davoud Fanaei	9	8	3	8	5	4	17	13	7
30	(Iran)	Mojtaba Rezaei	1	1	0	–	–	–	1	1	0
Total			29*	21	13	8*	5	4	37	26	17
Last updated: 22 August 2020

- Second-leg match against Foolad in the league was not played because Foolad failed to show up.
- Second-leg match against Esteghlal Ahvaz in Hazfi Cup was not played because Esteghlal Ahvaz failed to show up.
