= List of Persepolis F.C. seasons =

This is a list of seasons played by Persepolis Football Club in Iranian and Asian football, from 1963 to the most recent completed season. It details the club's achievements in major competitions, and the top scorers for each season. Top scorers in bold were also the top scorers in the Iranian league that season.

Persepolis in the beginning of the 1970s

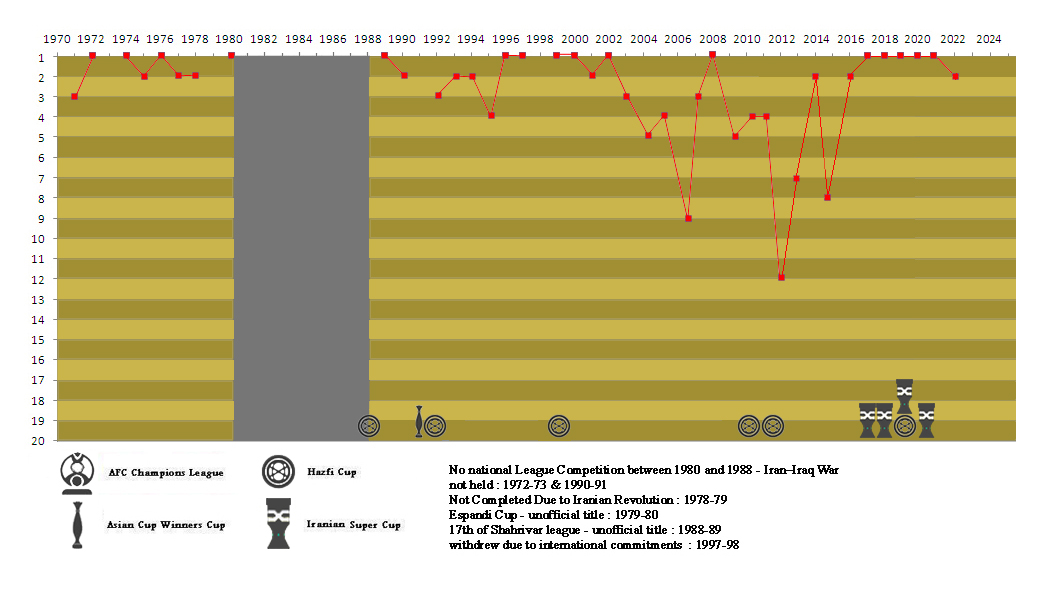
The Persepolis's positions

== Key ==
Key to league competitions:

- Iran Pro League (IPL) – Iran's top football league, established in 2001
- Azadegan League (Div 1) – The first tier of Iran football league until the inception of the Iran Pro League in 2001. It was downgraded to the second tier, but remained the highest division of the Iranian Football League until 2001, established in 1991
- Tehran Tournament (TT)
- Tehran Province League (TPL)
- Iranian Local League (ILL) – The first period of Iran football league, established in 1970
- Takht Jamshid Cup (TJC) – The first tier of Iran football league from 1973 until Islamic Revolution of Iran in 1979
- Qods League (QL) – The first period of Iran football league after Islamic Revolution, held in 1989

Key to colours and symbols:

**1st** or **W**	**Winners**
2nd or RU	Runners-up
**Top scorer of competition**

Key to league record:

- Season = The year and article of the season
- P = Played
- W = Games won
- D = Games drawn
- L = Games lost
- F = Goals for
- A = Goals against
- Pts = Points
- Pos = Final position

Key to cup record:

- NH = Not held
- DNE = Did not enter
- QGR = Qualifying Group Round
- GS = Group Stage
- LS = League Stage
- R64 = Round of 64
- R32 = Round of 32
- R16 = Round of 16
- QF = Quarter-finals
- SF = Semi-finals
- RU = Runners-up
- W = Winners

== Seasons ==
Season	League									Hazfi Cup	Asia		Other		League's Top scorer		Manager	Fans
Season	Division	P	W	D	L	F	A	Pts	Pos	Hazfi Cup	Competition	Result	Competition	Result	Name	Goals	Manager	Fans
1968– 69	TT	4	3	1	0	6	1	7	**1st**	NH	Asian Club Championship	GS	Tehran Hazfi Cup	RU			Parviz Dehdari	
1969– 70	TPL	15	5	2	8	19	24	12	11th	NH	DNE						Rajabali Faramarzi	
1970– 71	ILL TPL	4 14	2 10	0 4	2 0	10 25	6 3	4 24	4th 2nd	NH	DNE				**Hossein Kalani**	**7**	Hossein Fekri	
1971– 72	ILL	14	13	0	1	45	6	26	**1st**	NH	NH				**Hossein Kalani** **Safar Iranpak**	**11**	Alan Rogers	
1972– 73	TPL	15	5	4	6	12	15	14	9th	NH	NH						Alan Rogers	
1973– 74	TJC	22	15	7	0	46	4	37	**1st**	NH	NH				Hossein Kalani Safar Iranpak	8	Alan Rogers	
1974– 75	TJC	22	12	7	3	32	13	31	2nd	NH	NH						Alan Rogers	
1975– 76	TJC	30	16	12	2	36	12	42	**1st**	R16	NH				Safar Iranpak	10	Homayoun Behzadi Büyük Vatankhah	
1976– 77	TJC	30	10	17	3	25	18	37	2nd	R16	NH						Ivan Kuonoev	
1977– 78	TJC	30	14	10	6	45	27	38	2nd	NH	NH				Alan Whittle	9	Mansour Amirasefi Mehrab Shahrokhi	
1978– 79	TJC	**Not completed due to Islamic Revolution in Iran**								NH	NH						Mehrab Shahrokhi	
1979– 80	Espandi Cup								**1st**	NH	NH						Mehrab Shahrokhi	
1980– 81	TPL	**Not held due to start of Iran–Iraq War**								NH	NH						Mehrab Shahrokhi	
1981– 82	TPL	13	5	7	1	19	14	17	2nd	NH	NH		Tehran Hazfi Cup	RU	Abbas Kargar	5	Mehrab Shahrokhi	
1982– 83	TPL	17	13	4	0	39	5	30	**1st**	NH	NH		Tehran Hazfi Cup	**W**	**Ali Parvin**	**15**	Ali Parvin	
1983– 84	TPL	17	12	2	3	33	14	26	2nd	NH	NH				**Nasser Mohammadkhani**	**13**	Ali Parvin	
1984– 85	TPL	**Not finished**								NH	NH						Ali Parvin	
1985– 86	TPL	9	4	2	3	11	11	10	5th	NH	NH						Ali Parvin	
1986– 87	TPL	8	6	2	0	16	4	14	**1st**	R16	NH		Tehran Hazfi Cup	**W**	**Farshad Pious**	**7**	Ali Parvin	
1987– 88	TPL	17	13	2	2	31	8	28	**1st**	**W**	NH				**Farshad Pious**	**13**	Ali Parvin	
1988– 89	TPL	15	11	4	0	28	7	37	**1st**	SF	Asian Club Championship	QGR			**Farshad Pious**	**13**	Ali Parvin	
1989– 90	QL TPL	20 15	11 12	9 2	0 1	34 28	10 6	31 26	2nd **1st**	NH	DNE						Ali Parvin	
1990– 91	TPL	17	13	4	0	34	8	30	**1st**	SF	Asian Cup Winners' Cup	**W**			**Farshad Pious**	**16**	Ali Parvin	
1991– 92	Div 1 TPL	22 15	13 11	5 2	4 2	30 27	12 9	31 24	3rd 2nd	**W**	DNE				**Farshad Pious** **Farshad Pious**	**11** **16**	Ali Parvin	
1992– 93	Div 1	14	6	6	2	25	8	18	2nd	NH	Asian Cup Winners' Cup	RU			Hassan Shirmohammadi	8	Ali Parvin	
1993– 94	Div 1	26	10	11	5	40	25	31	2nd	QF	Asian Cup Winners' Cup	QF					Ali Parvin Mohammad Panjali	
1994– 95	Div 1	22	14	5	3	53	17	33	4th	R16	DNE				**Farshad Pious**	**20**	Vladislav Brajović Hamid Derakhshan	
1995– 96	Div 1	30	15	12	3	33	18	57	**1st**	withdrew	DNE						Hans-Jürgen Gede Stanko Poklepović	
1996– 97	Div 1	30	17	8	5	52	24	59	**1st**	withdrew bef. SF	Asian Club Championship	3rd					Stanko Poklepović Hamid Derakhshan	
1997– 98	Div 1	**Withdrew due to international commitments**								NH	Asian Club Championship	4th					Hamid Derakhshan Ivica Matković	
1998– 99	Div 1	30	19	8	3	56	21	65	**1st**	**W**	DNE				Edmond Bezik	11	Ivica Matković Ali Parvin	
1999–2000	Div 1	26	15	9	2	45	23	54	**1st**	withdrew bef. R16	Asian Club Championship	3rd			Behnam Seraj	11	Ali Parvin	
2000– 01	Div 1	22	13	7	2	36	16	46	2nd	R16	Asian Club Championship	3rd			Behrouz Rahbarifar	7	Ali Parvin	
2001– 02	IPL	26	13	10	3	36	23	49	**1st**	QF	DNE				Sohrab Entezari	9	Ali Parvin	
2002– 03	IPL	26	11	11	4	30	21	44	3rd	R16	Champions League	GS			Ali Ansarian Payan Rafat	5	Ali Parvin	
2003– 04	IPL	26	10	9	7	42	28	39	5th	R16	DNE				**Ali Daei**	**16**	Vinko Begović	
2004– 05	IPL	30	16	7	7	43	27	55	4th	R16	DNE				Javad Kazemian	9	Rainer Zobel	
2005– 06	IPL	30	9	11	10	39	40	32	13th	RU	DNE				Javad Kazemian	11	Ali Parvin Arie Haan	30,330
2006– 07	IPL	30	14	11	5	49	33	53	3rd	SF	DNE				Mehrzad Madanchi	10	Mustafa Denizli	40,350
2007– 08	IPL	34	18	11	5	55	34	59	**1st**	R16	DNE				**Mohsen Khalili**	**18**	Afshin Ghotbi	60,380
2008– 09	IPL	34	15	10	9	50	41	55	5th	QF	Champions League	R16			Ibrahima Touré	11	Ghotbi / Peyrovani / Vingada	47,952
2009– 10	IPL	34	13	14	7	46	40	53	4th	**W**	DNE				Karim Bagheri	10	Zlatko Kranjčar Ali Daei	47,826
2010– 11	IPL	34	17	7	10	50	36	58	4th	**W**	Champions League	GS			Mohammad Nouri	9	Ali Daei	30,769
2011– 12	IPL	34	10	12	12	50	54	42	12th	QF	Champions League	R16			Ali Karimi	11	Hamid Estili Mustafa Denizli	50,600
2012– 13	IPL	34	12	14	8	41	31	50	7th	RU	DNE				Karim Ansarifard	8	Manuel José Yahya Golmohammadi	67,980
2013– 14	IPL	30	16	8	6	34	15	55	2nd	QF	DNE				M. Reza Khalatbari Mehdi Seyed Salehi	6	Ali Daei	69,110
2014– 15	IPL	30	9	9	12	31	35	36	8th	SF	Champions League	R16			Mehdi Taremi	7	Daei / Derakhshan / Ivanković	15,768
2015– 16	IPL	30	16	9	5	50	34	57	2nd	QF	DNE				**Mehdi Taremi**	**16**	Branko Ivanković	71,071
2016– 17	IPL	30	20	6	4	46	14	66	**1st**	R64	Champions League	Advanced			**Mehdi Taremi**	**18**	Branko Ivanković	48,567
2017– 18	IPL	30	19	7	4	48	15	64	**1st**	QF	2017 ACL 2018 ACL	SF Advanced	Iranian Super Cup	**W**	**Ali Alipour**	**19**	Branko Ivanković	39,786
2018– 19	IPL	30	16	13	1	36	14	61	**1st**	**W**	2018 ACL 2019 ACL	RU GS	Iranian Super Cup	**W**	Ali Alipour	14	Branko Ivanković	40,300
2019– 20	IPL	30	21	4	5	46	17	67	**1st**	SF	Postponed to next season due to COVID-19 pandemic		Iranian Super Cup	**W**	Ali Alipour	12	Gabriel Calderón Yahya Golmohammadi	27,556
2020– 21	IPL	30	19	10	1	47	14	67	**1st**	QF	2020 ACL 2021 ACL	RU Advanced	Iranian Super Cup	**W**	Ahmad Nourollahi	10	Yahya Golmohammadi	NC
2021– 22	IPL	30	18	9	3	44	21	63	2nd	QF	Champions League	QF	Iranian Super Cup	RU	Mehdi Abdi	7	Yahya Golmohammadi	11,000
2022– 23	IPL	30	20	6	4	46	13	66	**1st**	**W**	Disqualified				Mehdi Torabi	7	Yahya Golmohammadi	23,111
2023– 24	IPL	30	20	8	2	45	18	68	**1st**	R16	Champions League	GS	Iranian Super Cup	**W**	Issa Alekasir	7	Yahya Golmohammadi Osmar Loss	40,750
2024– 25	IPL	30	18	6	6	42	20	60	3rd	R16	Champions League Elite	LS	Iranian Super Cup	RU	Ali Alipour	12	Juan Carlos Garrido İsmail Kartal	16,536
2025– 26	IPL	**Not completed due to 2026 Iran–USA and Israel war**									DNE						Vahid Hashemian Osmar Loss	8,000
2026– 27	IPL	10	6	2	2	18	5	20	1st	TBD	DNE				**Ali Alipour**	**4**	Mehdi Tartar	
Total National League		**1066**	**547**	**338**	**181**	%W:**51.31**		**1828**										
Grand Total		**1276**	**683**	**386**	**207**	%W:**53.52**		**2085**										

== Squads ==
This is selection of the most famous squads of Persepolis Football club from 1963 to the most recent completed season.

=== Famous Squads ===

Persepolis Squad 1971–72 (4-3-3)
Coach: (England) Alan Rogers

Persepolis Squad 1977–78 (4-1-3-2)
Coach: Mansour Amirasefi

Persepolis Squad 1986–87 (4-4-2)
Coach: (Iran) Ali Parvin

Persepolis Squad 1998–99 (3-5-2)
Coach: (Iran) Ali Parvin

Persepolis Squad 2003–04 (3-5-2)
Coach: (Croatia) Vinko Begović

Persepolis Squad 2007–08 (4-2-3-1)
Coach: (Iran) (United States) Afshin Ghotbi

Persepolis Squad 2016–17 (4-1-3-2)
Coach: (Croatia) Branko Ivanković

Persepolis Squad 2020–21 (4-2-2-2)
Coach: (Iran) Yahya Golmohammadi

== Memorable matches ==
- **Persepolis F.C.** vs **Jam Abadan**
  1967

Persepolis was a weak team and played in 2nd Division at that time. Although it was a friendly match, but it was the birth of a new pole in Iranian football. 4 of Shahin players played for Persepolis at that match : Ebrahim Ashtiani, Nazem Ganjapour, Kazem Rahimi (as Captain) and Bahman Norouzi. After it rest of Shahin players joined Persepolis.

- **Persepolis F.C.** 0-1 **Paykan F.C.**
  December 22, 1970

Paykan used Persepolis’ previous season players except of Aziz Asli and Mahmoud Khordbin and Persepolis played with a young line-up because of contract between Abdo and Khayami. Ali Parvin scored Paykan's victorious goal!

- **Persepolis F.C.** 6-0 **Esteghlal**
  September 7, 1973

Persepolis defeated Esteghlal in the Tehran derby. Persepolis players Homayoun Behzadi, scored hattrick; Iraj Soleimani, scored brace; and another goal scored by Hossein Kalani.

- **Persepolis F.C.** 5-0 **Homa F.C.**
  July 8, 1988

Homa was beaten by 5 goals. Behrouz Soltani Goalkeeper of Persepolis played as a striker and scored a goal!

- **Persepolis F.C.** 0 (4)-0 (2) **Esteghlal**
  February, 1989

This is one of few times the two clubs have met each other in the Hazfi Cup. The match finished scoreless in regulation time, and extra-time was eventless. Persepolis beat Esteghlal 4–2 in penalty shootouts to advance to the next stage in the Hazfi Cup.

- **Persepolis F.C.** 0-3 **Esteghlal**
  January 11, 1995

In the 38th derby Persepolis was leading in the match by a score of 2-0 until the last 10 minutes of the match. Esteghlal scored 2 goals in quick succession, including one which was a penalty. This angered the Persepolis fans and players who felt the referee was biased towards Esteghlal. Persepolis fans stormed the field, and many fights broke out on the pitch between fans and players. After this match it was decided that Iranian referees will no longer be used for the derby.

- **Persepolis F.C.** 2-2 **Esteghlal**
  December 29, 2000

One of the most exciting and heated matches in derby history. The game was extremely sensitive as Mehdi Hasheminasab had left Persepolis in the off-season for Esteghlal. Behrouz Rahbarifar opened up the scoring in minute 56, while Mohammad Navazi tied the game up at the 67th minute. Many thought the game would be over when Hasheminasab scored a late goal at minute 86, but Ali Karimi saved Persepolis scoring a spectacular goal at minute 89 to please the red fans. During the game Esteghlal's goalkeeper Parviz Broumand and Persepolis striker Payan Rafat were constantly insulting each other. This eventually led to Broumand punching Rafat in the face and giving him a black eye. A massive fight broke out between the players. After the match hooligans went on a rampage. They completely destroyed 250 city buses and damaged many shops. Three players from each side were arrested along with 60 fans for their behavior.

- **Persepolis F.C.** 1-0 **Fajr Sepasi**
  May 28, 2002

Persepolis' win against Fajr Sepasi on the last day of the 2001–02 league with Ebrahim Asadi's header just after he substituted gave them the title of first ever IPL champions.

- **Persepolis F.C.** 1-2 **Bayern Munich**
  January 2, 2006

It was the retirement match for Ahmadreza Abedzadeh. Ali Karimi was one of Bayern players and played against his former club. Ali Ansarian scored for Persepolis .

- **Persepolis F.C.** 2-1 **Sepahan**
  May 17, 2008

Persepolis won Sepahan in front of over 100’000 fans and became 2007–08 IPL champion. Mohsen Khalili lead Persepolis, After a while Ehsan Hajsafi tied game and it meant Sepahan is the champion. In 90+6th min when everyone was chill, in a chancy position, Captain Karim Bagheri Sent a Pass and Sepehr Heidari's Header lead Persepolis and gave them championship.

- **Persepolis** 3-2 **Esteghlal**
  February 2, 2012

After losing four times in a row, Persepolis and its fans were desperate for a win over their blue rivals. Head coach Mustafa Denizli had returned to the reds for the second half of the season and had previously experienced victory over Esteghlal back in 2006. Persepolis found themselves 2–0 down yet again and had Mehrdad Oladi very harshly sent off for what was seen as just a foul. Mazloumi and blues fans were beginning celebrations of yet another victory over their rivals as Persepolis fans began to leave the stadium when suddenly newly signed forward Eamon Zayed bagged a goal back for the reds in the 82nd minute. Persepolis were lifted by this goal and Zayed immediately connected with Mehdi Mahdavikia's excellent cross a minute later and levelled the score to 2–2 with a fine header. The last five minutes of the game was very open with Persepolis looking more lively and in the 92nd minute of the match, Hossein Badamaki's cross found Zayed yet again and the Libyan striker turned his defender and finished brilliantly to round off a historic hat-trick and great win for Persepolis and its fans.

- **Persepolis** 4-2 **Esteghlal**
  April 15, 2016

The 82nd Tehran derby, played on Friday during week 26 of the Iran Pro League, held significant implications for the league standings as both clubs were competing for the top position. Prior to the match, Esteghlal held second place, leading Persepolis on goal difference.

Persepolis defeated Esteghlal 4-2 to take the top position in the league table. Medhi Taremi scored twice, with Ramin Rezaeian and Mohsen Mosalman adding one goal each for Persepolis. Jaber Ansari and Omid Ebrahimi scored for Esteghlal, the latter converting a penalty.

Following the match, Persepolis players and supporters noted that the 4-2 scoreline corresponded to the number 24, the jersey number of former Persepolis captain Hadi Norouzi, who had just died from a heart attach earlier in the season.

== See also ==
- Persepolis F.C.
- Persepolis F.C. Honours
- Takht Jamshid Cup
- 17th of Shahrivar league
- Azadegan League
- Iran Pro League
- AFC Champions League
- Asian Cup Winners' Cup
