= Persepolis F.C.–Tractor S.C. rivalry =

Iranian football rivalry

Persepolis F.C. v Tractor S.C.
- Other names: Reds Derby
- Location: Tehran, Iran; Tabriz, Iran
- Teams: Persepolis Football Club; Tractor Sport Club
- First meeting: Tractor 0–3 Persepolis (April 19, 1975)
- Latest meeting: Tractor 1–0 Persepolis (24 August 2026)

Statistics
- Total meetings: Official matches: 60; Total matches: 63
- Most wins: Officials: Persepolis (29); Total: Persepolis (30)
- Top scorer: Farshad Pious (9)
- Largest victory: Persepolis 5–2 Tractor; 1999–2000 Azadegan League (9 March 2000); Tractor 4–1 Persepolis; 2011–12 Persian Gulf Cup (26 April 2012)

The rivalry between Persepolis and Tractor is a footballing rivalry played between Iranian clubs Persepolis and Tractor.

== History ==
=== Tractor return to first tier and Navad TV show ===
This rivalry began in 1975, but it intensified in 2009 when Tractor returned to first tier of Iranian football league after 8 years and their fans had passion about this event. For the first time, a club except Esteghlal and Persepolis had too much fans in many of Iran's stadiums including Azadi, Esteghlal and Persepolis home ground. Their passion was so great that the Navad TV show arranged a vote quiz about the hottest fans in Iran and Tractor became first. Their coach Faraz Kamalvand declared on that program "Our fans are most popular fans in Iran too." This caused on other night Navad program arranged a vote quiz about the most popular fans in Iran and Tractor became third after Persepolis and Esteghlal. their fans didn't accept this result and protested and also looked Esteghlal and Persepolis as a Rival. On the other hand, with Tractor getting stronger, the rivalry between them and Tehran giants became more intense and Tractor won many times in Azadi stadium. In the years after that this rivalry was a bit overwhelmed by violence from both fans.

== Iranian League ==
No.	Date	Home team	Score	Away team	Home goal scorers	Away goal scorers	Venue	Competition
3	1975–Apr-19	Tractor	0–3	Persepolis	–	Fattahi (21, 90), Iranpak (37)	Tabriz	1975–76 Takht Jamshid Cup
4	1975–Oct-10	Persepolis	1–0	Tractor	Parvin (32 p.)	–	Tehran	1975–76 Takht Jamshid Cup
5	1977–Mar-11	Persepolis	1–1	Tractor	Parvin (87)	Dayani (51 o.g.)	Tehran	1977–78 Takht Jamshid Cup
6	1977–Sep-08	Tractor	2–2	Persepolis	Mahnamay Aghdam (52), Mazloumi (67)	Whittle (15), Khordbin (75)	Tabriz	1977–78 Takht Jamshid Cup
7	1978–Jul-14	Tractor	1–1	Persepolis	Anjabini (64)	Parvin (44)	Tabriz	1978–79 Takht Jamshid Cup
8	1989–Aug-18	Persepolis	2–0	Tractor	M. Ansarifard (17), Kermani Moghaddam (52)	–	Tehran	1989–90 Qods League
9	1990–Jan-05	Tractor	0–0	Persepolis	–	–	Tabriz	1989–90 Qods League
10	1991–Sep-06	Tractor	1–4	Persepolis	Sheykhlari (48)	Pious (8, 32, 43, 90)	Tabriz	1991–92 Azadegan League
11	1992–Feb-26	Persepolis	2–1	Tractor	Shirmohammadi (6), Pious (83)	Zolmajidian (35)	Tehran	1991–92 Azadegan League
12	1993–Dec-03	Tractor	2–1	Persepolis	Alishiri (25), Paknejad (88)	Shahmohammadi (89)	Tabriz	1993–94 Azadegan League
13	1994–Feb-07	Persepolis	1–1	Tractor	Derakhshan (39)	Zolmajidian (20)	Tehran	1993–94 Azadegan League
14	1994–Jun-24	Tractor	1–1	Persepolis	Hassandokht (52)	Pious (78)	Tabriz	1994–95 Azadegan League
15	1994–Nov-04	Persepolis	2–1	Tractor	Pious (35, 87 p.)	Bakhshizadeh (14)	Tehran	1994–95 Azadegan League
16	1996–Oct-13	Tractor	1–1	Persepolis	Mohammadvand (77 p.)	Torabian (47)	Tabriz	1996–97 Azadegan League
17	1997–Jul-05	Persepolis	2–2	Tractor	Pious (5), Mahdavikia (44)	Rostami (55), Ferasati (88)	Tehran	1996–97 Azadegan League
18	1997–Jan-16	Tractor	2–2	Persepolis	Farshbaf (18), Azadi (79)	Bezik (21), Mahdavikia (73)	Tabriz	1997–98 Azadegan League
19	1999–Jan-12	Tractor	2–4	Persepolis	Barmak (10 p., 84 p.)	Halali (22 p.), Hasheminasab (42), Karimi (53), Estili (55)	Tabriz	1998–99 Azadegan League
20	1999–Apr-18	Persepolis	0–0	Tractor	–	–	Tehran	1998–99 Azadegan League
21	1999–Oct-07	Tractor	1–1	Persepolis	Peyrovani (62 o.g.)	Baghmisheh (88)	Tabriz	1999–2000 Azadegan League
22	2000–Mar-09	Persepolis	5–2	Tractor	Bezik (37, 48), Karimi (65), Seraj (78), Hasheminasab (82 p.)	Tavakoli (9), Rostami (46)	Tehran	1999–2000 Azadegan League
23	2000–Dec-03	Persepolis	1–0	Tractor	Estili (44)	–	Tehran	2000–01 Azadegan League
24	2001–Feb-28	Tractor	0–3	Persepolis	–	Karimi (5), Rafat (46), Asadi (79)	Tabriz	2000–01 Azadegan League
25	2001–Nov-18	Tractor	0–1	Persepolis	–	Jabbari (85)	Tabriz	2001–02 Iran Pro League
26	2002–Mar-12	Persepolis	2–1	Tractor	Halali (10), Entezari (84)	Aliyari (68)	Tehran	2001–02 Iran Pro League
27	2009–Oct-26	Persepolis	2–1	Tractor	Zarei (65), Mulla Mohammed (86)	Kheirkhah (90+2)	Tehran	2009–10 Persian Gulf Cup
28	2010–Apr-16	Tractor	1–1	Persepolis	Kheirkhah (38)	Norouzi (56)	Tabriz	2009–10 Persian Gulf Cup
29	2010–Jul–27	Persepolis	1–0	Tractor	Rezaei (46)	–	Tehran	2010–11 Persian Gulf Cup
30	2010–Dec-09	Tractor	1–0	Persepolis	Jassim (27 p.)	–	Tabriz	2010–11 Persian Gulf Cup
31	2011–Dec-02	Persepolis	0–1	Tractor	–	Akbapour (65)	Tehran	2011–12 Persian Gulf Cup
32	2012–Apr-26	Tractor	4–1	Persepolis	Flávio (50, 63), Hatami (57), Ebrahimi (65)	Nourmohammadi (79)	Tabriz	2011–12 Persian Gulf Cup
33	2012–Dec-03	Persepolis	0–1	Tractor	–	Seyed-Salehi (77)	Tehran	2012–13 Persian Gulf Cup
34	2013–May-10	Tractor	3–1	Persepolis	Seyed-Salehi (32), Karimian (53), Geílson (90)	Haghighi (69)	Tabriz	2012–13 Persian Gulf Cup
36	2013–Jul–24	Persepolis	1–0	Tractor	Seyed-Salehi (80)	–	Tehran	2013–14 Persian Gulf Cup
37	2013–Nov-28	Tractor	1–0	Persepolis	K. Ansarifard (40)	–	Tabriz	2013–14 Persian Gulf Cup
38	2014–Sep-05	Persepolis	1–3	Tractor	Bengar (39)	Makani (68 o.g.), Édinho (85), Nariman Jahan (90+2)	Tehran	2014–15 Persian Gulf Pro League
39	2015–Mar-08	Tractor	1–0	Persepolis	Saghebi 62'	–	Tabriz	2014–15 Persian Gulf Pro League
40	2015–Sep-25	Tractor	0–1	Persepolis	–	Bengtson (71 p.)	Tabriz	2015–16 Persian Gulf Pro League
41	2016-Mar-06	Persepolis	1–1	Tractor	Rezaeian (13)	Iranpourian (39)	Tehran	2015–16 Persian Gulf Pro League
42	2016–Sep-10	Tractor	0–0	Persepolis	–	–	Tabriz	2016–17 Persian Gulf Pro League
43	2017-Feb-05	Persepolis	3–0	Tractor	Taremi (2), Rezaeian (23), Amiri (64)	–	Tehran	2016–17 Persian Gulf Pro League
44	2017–Aug-03	Tractor	1–2	Persepolis	Hatami (41)	Mensha (15), Kamyabinia (67)	Tabriz	2017–18 Persian Gulf Pro League
45	2017–Dec-29	Persepolis	2–0	Tractor	Alipour (45), Kamyabinia (78)	–	Tehran	2017–18 Persian Gulf Pro League
46	2018–Nov-25	Persepolis	0–0	Tractor	–	–	Tehran	2018–19 Persian Gulf Pro League
47	2019–May-1	Tractor	1–1	Persepolis	Esmaeilifar 79'	Kamyabinia (11)	Tabriz	2018–19 Persian Gulf Pro League
48	2019–Aug-30	Tractor	1–0	Persepolis	Hajsafi (45+2)	–	Tabriz	2019–20 Persian Gulf Pro League
49	2020–Jan-26	Persepolis	2–0	Tractor	Alipour (9), Amiri (55)	–	Tehran	2019–20 Persian Gulf Pro League
50	2021–Feb-4	Tractor	0–1	Persepolis	–	Hosseini (53)	Tabriz	2020–21 Persian Gulf Pro League
52	2021–Jul-26	Persepolis	3–1	Tractor	Abdi (64, 90+4), Nourollahi (68)	Babaei (50)	Tehran	2020–21 Persian Gulf Pro League
53	2022–Jan-3	Persepolis	2–1	Tractor	Alekasir (10), Nemati (55)	Babaei (24)	Tehran	2021–22 Persian Gulf Pro League
54	2022–May-19	Tractor	(0–0); 0–3	Persepolis	–	–	Tabriz	2021–22 Persian Gulf Pro League
55	2022–Oct-2	Persepolis	0–1	Tractor	–	Abbaszadeh (75)	Tehran	2022–23 Persian Gulf Pro League
56	2023–Mar-5	Tractor	2–3	Persepolis	Abbaszadeh (77, 84 p.)	Omri (18), Torabi (31), Hanonov (90+5)	Tabriz	2022–23 Persian Gulf Pro League
57	2023–Aug-16	Tractor	0–1	Persepolis	–	Sadeghi (42)	Tabriz	2023–24 Persian Gulf Pro League
58	2024–Feb-21	Persepolis	2–0	Tractor	Alekasir (57), Torabi (59)	–	Tehran	2023–24 Persian Gulf Pro League
59	2024–Aug-22	Tractor	1–1	Persepolis	Khalilzadeh (60)	El Amloud (89)	Tabriz	2024–25 Persian Gulf Pro League
60	2025–Jan-26	Persepolis	2–0	Tractor	Rafiei (11), Gvelesiani (73)	–	Tehran	2024–25 Persian Gulf Pro League
61	2025–Oct-30	Tractor	1–1	Persepolis	Hosseinzadeh (88)	Bakić (90+7)	Tabriz	2025–26 Persian Gulf Pro League
63	2026–Aug-24	Tractor	1–0	Persepolis	Štrkalj (90)	–	Tabriz	2026–27 Persian Gulf Pro League

== Iranian Cup ==
=== Hazfi Cup ===
No.	Date	Home team	Score	Away team	Home goal scorers	Away goal scorers	Venue	Season	Round
62	2025–Dec-18	Tractor	1–1 (8–7p.)	Persepolis	Torabi (56)	Kanaanizadegan (90+6)	Tabriz	2025–26	Round of 32

=== Super Cup ===
No.	Date	Home team	Score	Away team	Home goal scorers	Away goal scorers	Venue	Competition
51	2021–Jun-20	Persepolis	1–0	Tractor	Alekasir (61)	–	Tehran	2020 Super Cup

== Friendlies and Exhibitions ==
No.	Date	Home team	Score	Away team	Home goal scorers	Away goal scorers	Venue	Competition
1	1971–Nov-26	Tractor	1–1	Persepolis	Sedigh Azadi	Khordbin	Tabriz	Friendly
2	1975–Feb-14	Persepolis	0–0	Tractor	–	–	Tehran	Friendly
35	2013–Jul-3	Persepolis	1–0	Tractor	Shakeri (85)	–	Tehran	Friendly

== Summary of results ==
Tournament	Matches	Wins		Draws	Goals	
Tournament	Matches	Persepolis	Tractor	Draws	Persepolis	Tractor
League	58	28	12	18	82	51
Hazfi Cup	1	0	0	1	1	1
Super Cup	1	1	0	0	1	0
Total Official Matches	60	29	12	19	84	52
Exhibition games	3	1	0	2	2	1
Grand Total	63	30	12	21	86	53

=== Head-to-head ranking in League (1970–2025) ===
P.	71	72	74	75	76	77	78	90	92	93	94	95	96	97	98	99	00	01	02	03	04	05	06	07	08	09	10	11	12	13	14	15	16	17	18	19	20	21	22	23	24	25
1		1	1		1								1	1		1	1		1						1									1	1	1	1	1		1	1	1
2				2		2	2	2		2	2							2											2	2	2	2	2						2			
3									3	3										3				3										3								3
4	4							4				4										4					4	4					4				4	4		4	4	
5							5														5					5		5								5						
6																	6														6											
7																											7			7												
8											8																					8										
9															9																											
10									10																										10							
11																11																										
12														12				12											12													
13		13																					13																13			
14																			14																							
15																																										
16					16																																					
17												17																														
18																																										

• Total: Persepolis with 25 higher finishes, Tractor with 4 higher finishes (till end of the 2024–25 Persian Gulf Pro League)

== Records ==
Friendly matches are not included in the following records unless otherwise noted.

=== Results ===
==== Biggest wins (+3 goals difference) ====
Winning margin	Home team	Result	Away team	Date	Competition
3	Tractor	0–3	**Persepolis**	19 April 1975	League
3	Tractor	1–4	**Persepolis**	6 September 1991	League
3	**Persepolis**	5–2	Tractor	9 March 2000	League
3	Tractor	0–3	**Persepolis**	28 February 2001	League
3	**Tractor**	4–1	Persepolis	26 April 2012	League
3	**Persepolis**	3–0	Tractor	5 February 2017	League

==== Most goals in a match ====
Goals	Home team	Result	Away team	Date	Competition
7	Persepolis	5–2	Tractor	9 March 2000	League
6	Tractor	2–4	Persepolis	12 January 1999	League
5	Tractor	1–4	Persepolis	6 September 1991	League
5	Tractor	4–1	Persepolis	26 April 2012	League
5	Tractor	2–3	Persepolis	5 March 2023	League

==== Most consecutive wins ====
Games	Club	Period
6	Persepolis	9 March 2000 – 26 October 2009
6	Persepolis	26 January 2020 – 19 May 2022
5	Tractor	9 December 2010 – 10 May 2013

==== Most consecutive draws ====
Games	Period
3	11 March 1977 – 14 July 1978
3	13 October 1996 – 16 January 1997

==== Most consecutive without a draw ====
Games	Period
11	27 July 2010 – 25 September 2015
11	30 August 2019 – 21 February 2024

==== Longest unbeaten runs ====
Games	Club	Period
17 (9 wins)	Persepolis	7 February 1994 – 27 July 2010
9 (5 wins)	Persepolis	19 April 1975 – 26 February 1992
8 (4 wins)	Persepolis	25 September 2015 – 1 May 2019
7 (4 wins)	Persepolis	5 March 2023 – 18 December 2025
6 (6 wins)	Persepolis	26 January 2020 – 19 May 2022
5 (5 wins)	Tractor	9 December 2010 – 10 May 2013

==== Most consecutive games scoring ====
Games	Club	Period
10	Persepolis	6 September 1991 – 12 January 1999
10	Tractor	6 September 1991 – 12 January 1999
9	Persepolis	7 October 1999 – 27 July 2010

==== Most consecutive without conceding a goal ====
Games	Club	Period
3	Persepolis	3 December 2000 – 18 November 2001
3	Persepolis	26 January 2020 – 20 June 2021

=== Players ===
==== Goal scorers ====
- Does not include friendly matches.
- Player in **Bold** is still active in Persepolis or Tractor.

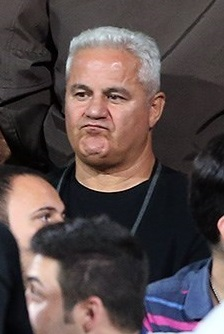
Farshad Pious, top goalscorer of rivalries with 9 goals

Pos.	Player	Club(s)	League	Cup	Super Cup	Total
1	(Iran) Farshad Pious	Persepolis	9	–	–	9
2	(Iran) Ali Parvin	Persepolis	3	–	–	3
2	(Iran) Edmond Bezik	Persepolis	3	–	–	3
2	(Iran) Ali Karimi	Persepolis	3	–	–	3
2	(Iran) Mehdi Seyed-Salehi	Tractor Persepolis	2 1	–	–	3
2	(Iran) Kamal Kamyabinia	Persepolis	3	–	–	3
2	(Iran) Mohammad Abbaszadeh	Persepolis	3	–	–	3
2	(Iran) **Mehdi Torabi**	Persepolis Tractor	2 –	– 1	–	3
2	(Iran) Issa Alekasir	Persepolis	2	–	1	3
10	(Iran) Jahangir Fattahi	Persepolis	2	–	–	2
10	(Iran) Akbar Zolmajidian	Tractor	2	–	–	2
10	(Iran) Mehdi Mahdavikia	Persepolis	2	–	–	2
10	(Iran) Kourosh Barmak	Tractor	2	–	–	2
10	(Iran) Davoud Rostami	Tractor	2	–	–	2
10	(Iran) Mehdi Hasheminasab	Persepolis	2	–	–	2
10	(Iran) Hamid Estili	Persepolis	2	–	–	2
10	(Iran) Esmaeil Halali	Persepolis	2	–	–	2
10	(Iran) Farhad Kheirkhah	Tractor	2	–	–	2
10	(Portugal) Flávio Paixão	Tractor	2	–	–	2
10	(Iran) Farzad Hatami	Tractor	2	–	–	2
10	(Iran) Ramin Rezaeian	Persepolis	2	–	–	2
10	(Iran) Vahid Amiri	Persepolis	2	–	–	2
10	(Iran) **Ali Alipour**	Persepolis	2	–	–	2
10	(Iran) Mehdi Abdi	Persepolis	2	–	–	2
10	(Iran) Peyman Babaei	Tractor	2	–	–	2
26	(Iran) Safar Iranpak	Persepolis	1	–	–	1
26	(England) Alan Whittle	Persepolis	1	–	–	1
26	(Iran) Rahim Mahnamay Aghdam	Tractor	1	–	–	1
26	(Iran) Parviz Mazloumi	Tractor	1	–	–	1
26	(Iran) Mahmoud Khordbin	Persepolis	1	–	–	1
26	(Iran) Kamel Anjabini	Tractor	1	–	–	1
26	(Iran) Mohammad Hassan Ansarifard	Persepolis	1	–	–	1
26	(Iran) Morteza Kermani Moghaddam	Persepolis	1	–	–	1
26	(Iran) Ahad Sheykhlari	Tractor	1	–	–	1
26	(Iran) Hassan Shirmohammadi	Persepolis	1	–	–	1
26	(Iran) Hassan Alishiri	Tractor	1	–	–	1
26	(Iran) Habib Paknejad	Tractor	1	–	–	1
26	(Iran) Jamshid Shahmohammadi	Persepolis	1	–	–	1
26	(Iran) Hamid Derakhshan	Persepolis	1	–	–	1
26	(Iran) Hossein Hassandokht	Tractor	1	–	–	1
26	(Iran) Yousef Bakhshizadeh	Tractor	1	–	–	1
26	(Iran) Reza Torabian	Persepolis	1	–	–	1
26	(Iran) Aref Mohammadvand	Tractor	1	–	–	1
26	(Iran) Nasser Ferasati	Tractor	1	–	–	1
26	(Iran) Mohammad Farshbaf	Tractor	1	–	–	1
26	(Iran) Mohammad Azadi	Tractor	1	–	–	1
26	(Iran) Ali Baghmisheh	Persepolis	1	–	–	1
26	(Iran) Asadollah Tavakoli	Tractor	1	–	–	1
26	(Iran) Behnam Seraj	Persepolis	1	–	–	1
26	(Iran) Payan Rafat	Persepolis	1	–	–	1
26	(Iran) Ebrahim Asadi	Persepolis	1	–	–	1
26	(Iran) Reza Jabbari	Persepolis	1	–	–	1
26	(Iran) Sohrab Entezari	Persepolis	1	–	–	1
26	(Iran) Farhad Aliyari	Tractor	1	–	–	1
26	(Iran) Mojtaba Zarei	Persepolis	1	–	–	1
26	(Iraq) Hawar Mulla Mohammed	Persepolis	1	–	–	1
26	(Iran) Hadi Norouzi	Persepolis	1	–	–	1
26	(Iran) Gholamreza Rezaei	Persepolis	1	–	–	1
26	(Iraq) Karrar Jassim	Tractor	1	–	–	1
26	(Iran) Siavash Akbarpour	Tractor	1	–	–	1
26	(Iran) Mohammad Ebrahimi	Tractor	1	–	–	1
26	(Iran) Alireza Nourmohammadi	Persepolis	1	–	–	1
26	(Iran) Mehdi Karimian	Tractor	1	–	–	1
26	(Iran) Reza Haghighi	Persepolis	1	–	–	1
26	(Brazil) Geílson	Tractor	1	–	–	1
26	(Iran) Karim Ansarifard	Tractor	1	–	–	1
26	(Iran) Mohsen Bengar	Persepolis	1	–	–	1
26	(Brazil) Edinho	Tractor	1	–	–	1
26	(Iran) Saman Nariman Jahan	Tractor	1	–	–	1
26	(Iran) Shahin Saghebi	Tractor	1	–	–	1
26	(Honduras) Jerry Bengtson	Persepolis	1	–	–	1
26	(Iran) Mohammad Iranpourian	Tractor	1	–	–	1
26	(Iran) Mehdi Taremi	Persepolis	1	–	–	1
26	(Nigeria) Godwin Mensha	Persepolis	1	–	–	1
26	(Iran) **Danial Esmaeilifar**	Tractor	1	–	–	1
26	(Iran) Ehsan Hajsafi	Tractor	1	–	–	1
26	(Iran) Jalal Hosseini	Persepolis	1	–	–	1
26	(Iran) Ahmad Nourollahi	Persepolis	1	–	–	1
26	(Iran) Siamak Nemati	Persepolis	1	–	–	1
26	(Iran) **Mohammad Omri**	Persepolis	1	–	–	1
26	(Tajikistan) Vahdat Hanonov	Persepolis	1	–	–	1
26	(Iran) Saeid Sadeghi	Persepolis	1	–	–	1
26	(Iran) **Shoja Khalilzadeh**	Tractor	1	–	–	1
26	(Morocco) Ayoub El Amloud	Persepolis	1	–	–	1
26	(Iran) Soroush Rafiei	Persepolis	1	–	–	1
26	(Georgia (country)) Giorgi Gvelesiani	Persepolis	1	–	–	1
26	(Iran) **Amirhossein Hosseinzadeh**	Tractor	1	–	–	1
26	(Montenegro) **Marko Bakić**	Persepolis	1	–	–	1
26	(Croatia) **Tomislav Štrkalj**	Tractor	1	–	–	1
26	(Iran) **Hossein Kanaanizadegan**	Persepolis	–	1	–	1

==== Top scorers by competition ====
Competition	Player	Club(s)	Goals
League	(Iran) Farshad Pious	Persepolis	9
Hazfi Cup	(Iran) Mehdi Torabi	Tractor	1
Hazfi Cup	(Iran) Hossein Kanaanizadegan	Persepolis	1
Super Cup	(Iran) Issa Alekasir	Persepolis	1

==== Most consecutive goalscoring ====
Player	Club	Consecutive matches	Total goals in the run	Start	End
(Iran) Mehdi Seyed-Salehi	Both	3		2012–13 Persian Gulf Cup (first leg)	2013–14 Persian Gulf Cup (first leg)

==== Goalkeeping ====
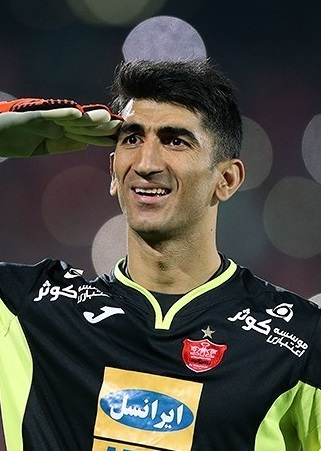
Alireza Beiranvand

==== Most clean sheets ====
- Players in **bold** are still active for Persepolis or Tractor.

Player	Club(s)	Period	CS	Total
(Iran) **Alireza Beiranvand**	Persepolis Tractor	2016–20, 2022–24 2024–Present	7 1	8
(Iran) Hamed Lak	Tractor Persepolis	2013–15 2020–22	2 2	4

=== Pokers ===
A poker is achieved when the same player scores four goals in one match. Listed in chronological order.

Seq.	Player	Time of goals	For	Final score	Date	Tournament
1.	(Iran) Farshad Pious	8', 32', 43', 90'	Persepolis	4–1 (A)	6 September 1991	1991–92 Azadegan League

=== Braces ===
A Brace is achieved when the same player scores two goals in one match. Listed in chronological order.

Seq.	Player	Time of goals	For	Final score	Date	Tournament
1.	(Iran) Jahangir Fattahi	21', 90'	Persepolis	3–0 (A)	19 April 1975	1975–76 Takht Jamshid Cup
2.	(Iran) Farshad Pious	35', 87' (p.)	Persepolis	2–1 (H)	4 November 1994	1994–95 Azadegan League
3.	(Iran) Kourosh Barmak	10' (p.), 84' (p.)	Tractor	2–4 (H)	12 January 1999	1998–99 Azadegan League
4.	(Iran) Edmond Bezik	37', 48'	Persepolis	5–2 (H)	9 March 2000	1999–2000 Azadegan League
5.	(Portugal) Flávio Paixão	51', 64'	Tractor	4–1 (H)	26 April 2012	2011–12 Persian Gulf Cup
6.	(Iran) Mehdi Abdi	64', 90+4'	Persepolis	3–1 (H)	26 July 2021	2020–21 Persian Gulf Pro League
7.	(Iran) Mohammad Abbaszadeh	77', 84' (p.)	Tractor	2–3 (H)	5 March 2023	2022–23 Persian Gulf Pro League

== Most successful coaches in rivalries ==
Friendly matches are not included in the following records unless otherwise noted.

Rank	Head coach	Club	Matches	Win	Lost	Win-Loss Differential	Winning rate
1	(Iran) Ali Parvin	Persepolis	12	9	0	+9	75%
2	(Iran) Yahya Golmohammadi	Persepolis Tractor	11	8 0	2 1	+5	72%
3	(Croatia) Branko Ivanković	Persepolis	8	4	0	+4	50%
4	(Portugal) Toni	Tractor	4	3	1	+2	75%
5	(Iran) Büyük Vatankhah	Persepolis	2	2	0	+2	100%
6	(Iran) Amir Ghalenoei	Tractor	5	2	1	+1	40%

Rules for classification: 1) Win-Loss Differential; 2) Number of Wins; 3) Winning rate.

== General performances ==
=== Trophies ===
- Numbers with this background indicate the record in the competition.

Persepolis	Competition	Tractor
Domestic
16	Iranian League	1
7	Iranian Hazfi Cup	2
5	Iranian Super Cup	1
28	Domestic aggregate	4
Asian
—	AFC Champions League Elite	—
1	Asian Cup Winners Cup	—
1	Asian aggregate	—
29	Total aggregate	4

=== General information ===
Titles	Persepolis	Tractor
Club name after establishment	Persepolis Sport Club	Tractor Sazi Sport Club
Founding date	Club: 22 November 1963; Football team: 21 March 1968	1970
Stadium	Azadi Stadium	Yadegar-e Emam Stadium
Capacity	78,116	66,833
Number of seasons in League	41 (1 withdrew due to national commitments)	30 (3 relegated)
Most goals scored in a season in League	56 (1971–72, 1998–99)	58 (2014–15)
Most points in a season in League	68 (2023–24)	68 (2024–25)
Number of Double wins (League and Hazfi Cup)	3 (Note: 1998–99, 2018–19, 2022–23)	—
Most Consecutive League trophies	5 times in a row (Glut) (Note: 2016–17, 2017–18, 2018–19, 2019–20, 2020–21)	—
Most Consecutive Hazfi Cup trophies	2 times in a row (Brace) (Note: 2009–10, 2010–11)	—

=== Awards ===
==== IFFHS award ====
The IFFHS Asian Player of the Year is an annual prize presented by International Federation of Football History & Statistics (IFFHS). It had originally been the predecessor of the AFC Player of the Year, but was revived in 2020.

Award	Persepolis	Tractor
1st	0	0
2nd	1 (Note: Farshad Pious (1990))	0
3rd	0	0
Total	1	0

==== AFC award ====
The AFC Player of the Year is an annual prize presented by Asian Football Confederation (AFC). It is awarded to the Asian player who has the best performance at AFC club(s) in a calendar year.

Award	Persepolis	Tractor
1st	0	0
2nd	2 (Note: Ali Karimi (2012), Alireza Beiranvand (2019))	0
3rd	0	0
Total	2	0

==== Best Footballer in Asia ====
Best Footballer in Asia is an annual association football award organized and presented by Titan Sports. It is awarded to the player who had the best performance for Asian football during the calendar year.

Award	Persepolis	Tractor
1st	0	0
2nd	0	0
3rd	1 (Note: Alireza Beiranvand (2018))	0
Total	1	0

==== League performances awards ====
Award	Persepolis	Tractor
Golden Boot	10 (Note: Hossein Kalani (1970–71, 1971–72), Safar Iranpak (1971–72), Farshad Pious (1991–92, 1994–95), Ali Daei (2003–04), Mohsen Khalili (2007–08), Mehdi Taremi (2015–16, 2016–17), Ali Alipour (2017–18))	4 (Note: Kourosh Barmak (1998–99), Karim Ansarifard (2013–14), Edinho (2014–15), Amirhossein Hosseinzadeh (2024–25))

== See also ==
- Football in Iran
- Persepolis F.C.
- Tractor S.C.
- Tehran Derby
- El Gilano
- Isfahan Derby
- Mashhad Derby
- Persepolis F.C.–Sepahan S.C. rivalry
- Esteghlal F.C.–Sepahan S.C. rivalry
- Major football rivalries
