= 2002 FIFA World Cup qualification (UEFA–AFC play-off) =

- Event: 2002 FIFA World Cup qualification
Republic of Ireland	Iran
(Republic of Ireland)	(Iran)
2	1
- (on aggregate)

First leg
Republic of Ireland	Iran
2	0
- Date: 10 November 2001
- Venue: Lansdowne Road, Dublin
- Referee: Antonio Pereira da Silva (Brazil)
- Attendance: 36,538

Second leg
Iran	Republic of Ireland
1	0
- Date: 15 November 2001
- Venue: Azadi Stadium, Tehran
- Referee: William Mattus Vega (Costa Rica)
- Attendance: 100,000

The 2002 FIFA World Cup UEFA–AFC qualification play-off was a two-legged home-and-away tie between a group runner-up of the European qualifying tournament, the Republic of Ireland, and the winners of the AFC play-off, Iran. The games were played on 10 November and 15 November 2001 in Dublin and Tehran, respectively.

Ireland beat Iran 2–0 in the first leg held in Dublin, while in the second leg, Iran defeated Ireland 1–0 in Tehran. The Irish side won the series 2–1 on aggregate, therefore qualifying to the World Cup.

== Venues ==
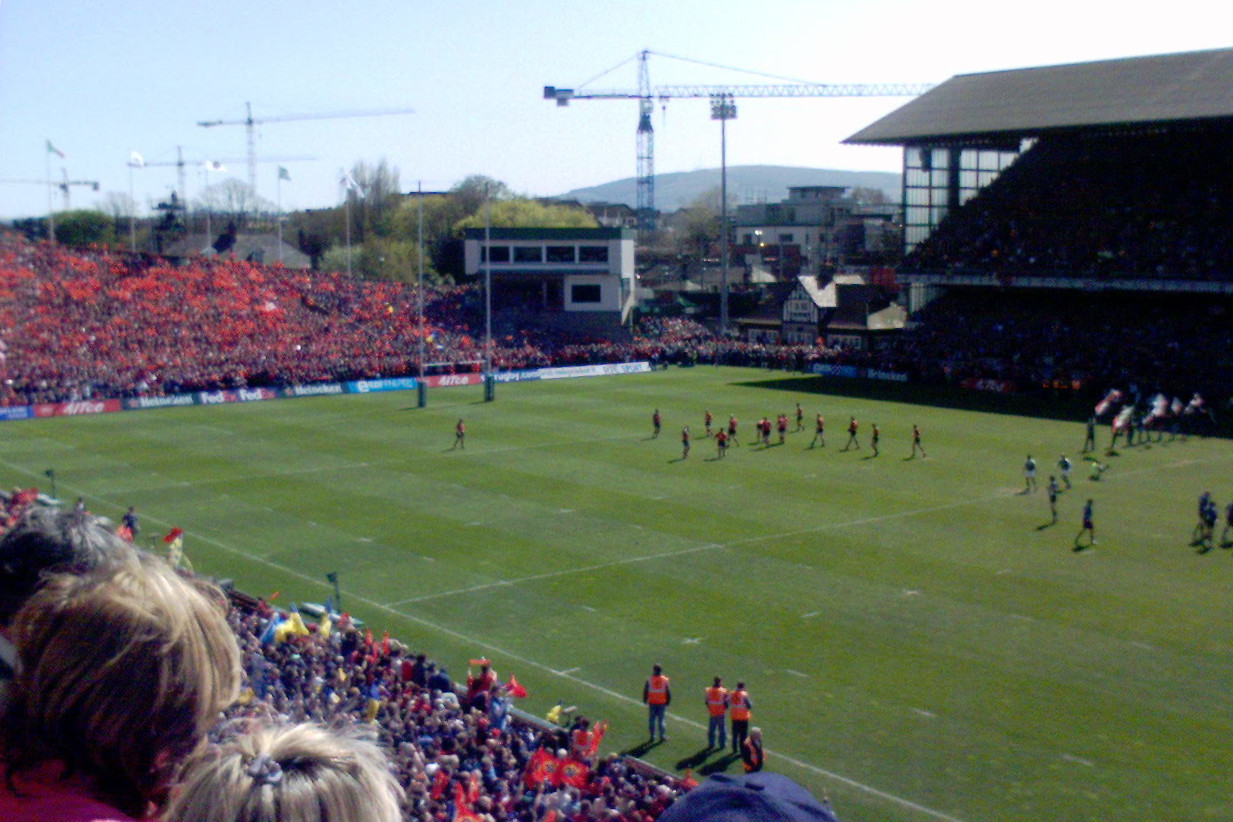
Lansdowne Road in Dublin (left) and Azadi Stadium in Tehran, venues for the series

== Background ==
Republic of Ireland
Round
Iran

Team	Pld	W	D	L	GF	GA	GD	Pts
Portugal	10	7	3	0	33	7	26	24
Republic of Ireland	10	7	3	0	23	5	18	24
Netherlands	10	6	2	2	30	9	21	20
Estonia	10	2	2	6	10	26	-16	8
Cyprus	10	2	2	6	13	31	-18	8
Andorra	10	0	0	10	5	36	-31	0

Final standings

Team	Pld	W	D	L	GF	GA	GD	Pts
Saudi Arabia	8	5	2	1	17	8	9	17
Iran	8	4	3	1	10	7	3	15
Bahrain	8	2	4	2	8	9	−1	10
Iraq	8	2	1	5	9	10	−1	7
Thailand	8	0	4	4	5	15	−10	4

AFC play-off
Opponent
Result

1st leg
United Arab Emirates (H)
1–0

2nd leg
United Arab Emirates (A)
3–0

== Match details ==
=== First leg ===
10 November 2001
20:10 UTC±0
First leg

Republic of Ireland	2–0	Iran
Harte 44'; Robbie Keane 50'	(Report)

Lansdowne Road, Dublin
Attendance: 36,538
Referee: Antonio Pereira da Silva (Brazil)

Republic of Ireland
Iran

GK	1	Shay Given
CB	6	Roy Keane (c)
CB	4	Gary Breen
CB	5	Steve Staunton		(substituted off) 75'
RWB	2	Steve Finnan	(yellow card) 85'
LWB	3	Ian Harte
CM	7	Jason McAteer		(substituted off) 83'
CM	8	Matt Holland
CM	11	Kevin Kilbane
CF	9	Niall Quinn
CF	10	Robbie Keane
Substitutions:
GK	16	Dean Kiely
DF	12	Gary Kelly		(substituted on) 83'
DF	13	Kenny Cunningham		(substituted on) 75'
MF	15	Mark Kinsella
MF	17	Lee Carsley
FW	18	Clinton Morrison
FW	14	David Connolly
Manager:
Mick McCarthy

GK	12	Ebrahim Mirzapour
RB	5	Afshin Peyrovani	(yellow card) 19'
CB	15	Yahya Golmohammadi	(yellow card) 86'
CB	24	Rahman Rezaei
LB	3	Mehrdad Minavand
CM	6	Karim Bagheri
CM	7	Hamed Kavianpour
RW	2	Mehdi Mahdavikia
AM	8	Ali Karimi
LW	11	Alireza Vahedi Nikbakht		(substituted off) 46'
CF	10	Ali Daei (c)
Substitutions:
MF	9	Sirous Dinmohammadi
MF	13	Javad Nekounam
FW	14	Mojahed Khaziravi		(substituted on) 46'
FW	18	Ali Samereh
DF	20	Behrouz Rahbarifar
FW	21	Faraz Fatemi
GK	22	Davoud Fanaei
Manager:
(Croatia) Miroslav Blažević

Assistant referees:
Jorge Oliveira (Brazil)
Aristeu Tavares (Brazil)
Fourth official:
Paulo César de Oliveira (Brazil)

Match rules

- 90 minutes
- 3 (of 7) substitutions permitted

=== Second leg ===
15 November 2001
21:10 UTC+3:30
Second leg

Iran	1–0	Republic of Ireland
Golmohammadi 90'	(Report)

Azadi Stadium, Tehran
Attendance: 100,000
Referee: William Mattus Vega (Costa Rica)

Iran
Republic of Ireland

GK	12	Ebrahim Mirzapour
RB	5	Afshin Peyrovani
CB	15	Yahya Golmohammadi
CB	24	Rahman Rezaei
LB	3	Mehrdad Minavand
CM	6	Karim Bagheri	(yellow card) 85'
CM	7	Hamed Kavianpour
RW	2	Mehdi Mahdavikia	(yellow card) 47'
AM	8	Ali Karimi
LW	11	Alireza Vahedi Nikbakht
CF	10	Ali Daei (c)
Substitutions:
MF	9	Sirous Dinmohammadi
DF	13	Javad Nekounam
MF	14	Mojahed Khaziravi
MF	17	Pejman Jamshidi
MF	18	Ali Samereh
FW	20	Behrouz Rahbarifar
GK	22	Davoud Fanaei
Manager:
(Croatia) Miroslav Blažević

GK	1	Shay Given
CB	6	Mark Kinsella
CB	4	Gary Breen
CB	5	Steve Staunton (c)
RWB	2	Steve Finnan
LWB	3	Ian Harte
CM	7	Jason McAteer	(yellow card) 84'
CM	8	Matt Holland
CM	11	Kevin Kilbane		(substituted off) 85'
CF	9	David Connolly
CF	10	Robbie Keane	(yellow card) 49'	(substituted off) 75'
Substitutions:
GK	16	Alan Kelly Jr.
DF	12	Gary Kelly		(substituted on) 85'
DF	13	Kenny Cunningham
FW	17	Niall Quinn
MF	14	Lee Carsley
FW	18	Clinton Morrison		(substituted on) 75'
DF	15	Andy O'Brien
Manager:
Mick McCarthy

Assistant referees:
Erick Mora (Costa Rica)
Efraín Rodríguez (Costa Rica)
Fourth official:
Olger Mejías Ovares (Costa Rica)

Match rules:

- 90 minutes
- 30 minutes of extra-time if necessary
- Penalty shoot-out if scores still level:
- 3 (of 7) substitutions permitted

== Aftermath ==
The elimination saw Iran manager Miroslav Blažević step down to be replaced by his assistant, Branko Ivanković.

The Republic of Ireland qualified to the 2002 FIFA World Cup and were drawn into Group E with Germany, Cameroon and Saudi Arabia. They drew with Cameroon and Germany with a score of 1–1 and in the final match, they won 3–0 against Saudi Arabia. This qualified them to the Round of 16 but they were eliminated by Spain on penalties (2–3) after the match ended in a 1–1 draw.
