= Davoud Fanaei =

Iranian footballer

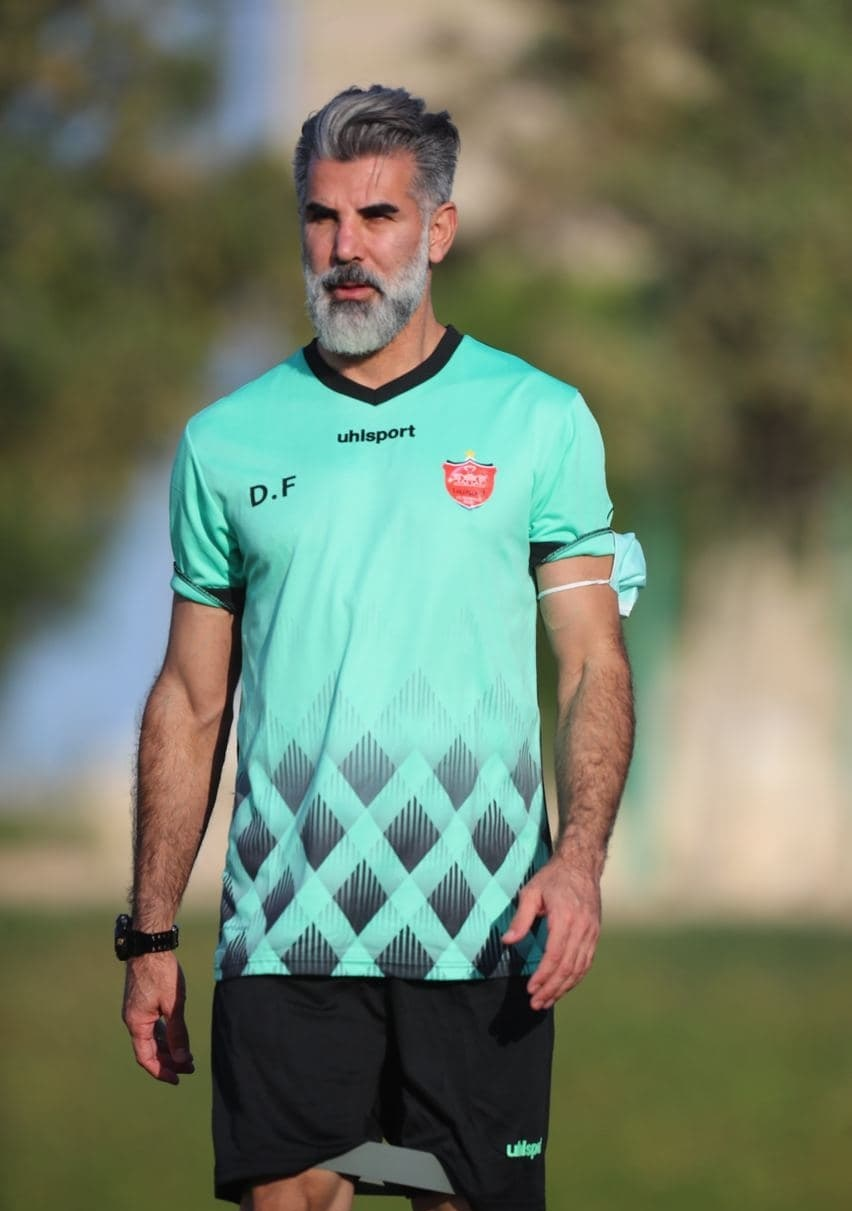

Personal information
- Full name: Davoud Fanaei
- Date of birth: January 19, 1975 (age 51)
- Place of birth: Tehran, Iran
- Height: 1.85 m (6 ft 1 in)
- Position: Goalkeeper

Senior career*
Years	Team	Apps	(Gls)
- Bank Melli
- Bahman
1995–1998	Polyacryl Esfahan		
1998–2003	Persepolis	77	(0)
2003–2004	Azarbayejan		
2004–2006	Persepolis	3	(0)
2007–2009	Steel Azin		

International career
2000–2002	Iran	5	(0)

Managerial career
- 2009–2010: Iran U-17 (goalkeeping coach)
- 2009–2013: Persepolis B (goalkeeping coach)
- 2013–2014: Saipa (goalkeeping coach)
- 2014–2016: Zob Ahan (goalkeeping coach)
- 2017–2018: Paykan (goalkeeping coach)
- 2018–2020: Shahr Khodro (goalkeeping coach)
- 2020–2022: Persepolis (goalkeeping coach)
- * Club domestic league appearances and goals

Davoud Fanaei (Persian: داوود فنایی, born January 19, 1975, in Tehran) is a retired Iranian football goalkeeper who played most of his career for Persepolis and represented for Iran national football team.

== Club career ==
He started his career in Persepolis under management of Ali Parvin and was substitute of Ahmadreza Abedzadeh, but slowly made himself a starter later.

=== Club career statistics ===
Club performance			League		Cup		Continental		Total	
Season	Club	League	Apps	Goals	Apps	Goals	Apps	Goals	Apps	Goals
Iran			League		Hazfi Cup		Asia		Total	
1998–99	Persepolis	Azadegan League	9	0	8	0	-	-	17	0
1999–00	Persepolis	Azadegan League	18	0	1	0	3	0	22	0
2000–01	Persepolis	Azadegan League	10	0	2	0	6	0	18	0
2001–02	Persepolis	Iran Pro League	21	0	3	0	-	-	24	0
2002–03	Persepolis	Iran Pro League	19	0			2	0		
2003–04	Azarbayejan	?					-	-		
2004–05	Persepolis	Iran Pro League	1	0			-	-		
2005–06	Persepolis	Iran Pro League	2	0	0	0	-	-	2	0
2007–08	Steel Azin	Azadegan League	0	0			-	-		
2008–09	Steel Azin	Azadegan League					-	-		
Career total							11	0		

== International career ==
His last cap was a friendly against Palestine on 4 April 2002.

== Honours ==
Persepolis

- Iranian Football League (3): 1998–99, 1999–2000, 2001–02
- Hazfi Cup (1): 1998–99
