= Hadi Mahdavikia =

Iranian football coach and former player (born 1979)

Personal information
- Full name: Mohammad Hadi Mahdavikia
- Date of birth: 23 June 1979 (age 47)
- Place of birth: Tehran, Iran
- Position: Midfielder

Team information
- Current team: KIA Academy (coach)

Youth career
- 1990–1995: Bank Melli
- 1995–1998: Persepolis

Senior career*
Years	Team	Apps	(Gls)
1998–2001	Persepolis	41	(2)
2001–2002	Hamburger SV (A)	0	(0)
2002–2003	Persepolis	0	(0)
2006–2007	Saipa	3	(0)
Total		44	(2)

Managerial career
- 2015–: KIA Academy
- * Club domestic league appearances and goals

Mohammad Hadi Mahdavikia (Persian: محمدهادی مهدوی‌کیا) is an Iranian football coach and former player who is currently the coach of KIA Football Academy.

In July 2001, he was transferred from Persepolis to Hamburger SV to play for its amateure team. However, he was injured in August and did not play any matches.

He is the younger brother of Mehdi Mahdavikia.

== Honours ==
Persepolis

- Azadegan League (2): 1998–1999, 1999–2000
- Hazfi Cup: 1998–1999

Hamburger SV Amateure

- Oberliga Hamburg/Schleswig-Holstein: 2001–2002

Saipa

- Persian Gulf Pro League: 2006–2007
