= Alireza Emamifar =

Iranian footballer and manager

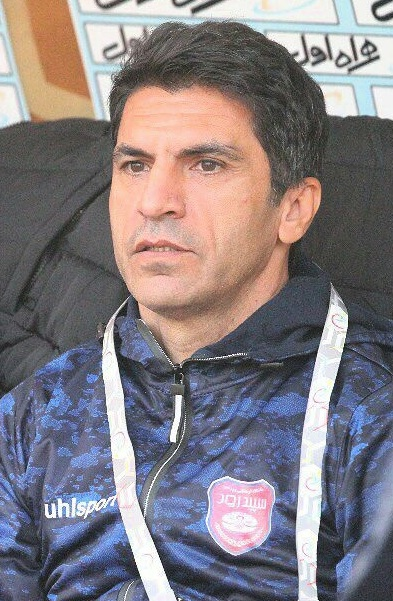

Personal information
- Full name: Alireza Emamifar
- Date of birth: 16 September 1974 (age 52)
- Place of birth: Shiraz, Iran

Team information
- Current team: Iran U23 (assistant coach)

Youth career
- 1989–1994: Persepolis

Senior career*
| Years | Team | Apps | (Gls) |
| 1994–2000 | Persepolis | | |
| 2000–2001 | Fajr Sepasi | | |
| 2001–2003 | Charleroi | 16 | (2) |
| 2003–2005 | Persepolis | 28 | (2) |
| 2008–2009 | Armin Tehran | | |
| 2009–2010 | Shahrdari Mahshahr | | |

International career
| 1998–2000 | Iran | 20 | (0) |

Managerial career
- 2010–2012: Bargh Shiraz
- 2012–2014: Parseh
- 2014–2015: Persepolis (assistant)
- 2016–2017: Khooneh be Khooneh (assistant)
- 2017–2018: Naft Tehran (assistant)
- 2018–2019: Sepidrood (assistant)
- 2019–: Iran U23 (assistant)
- * Club domestic league appearances and goals

Alireza Emamifar (Persian: علیرضا امامی فر; born 16 September 1974) is an Iranian football coach and retired player. He is currently assistant coach of the Iran national under-23 team. He played as a midfielder.

== Career ==
Emamifar played three seasons with R. Charleroi S.C. in the Belgian First Division.

| Season | Team | Country | Division | Apps | Goals |
|---|---|---|---|---|---|
| 03/04 | Persepolis | Iran | 1 | 11 | 0 |
| 04/05 | Persepolis | Iran | 1 | 17 | 2 |

== Honours ==
Persepolis

- Iranian Football League (4): 1995–96, 1996–97, 1998–99, 1999–00
- Hazfi Cup (1): 1998–99

Fajr Sepasi

- Hazfi Cup (1): 2000–01
