= Ali Ansarian =

Iranian footballer (1977–2021)

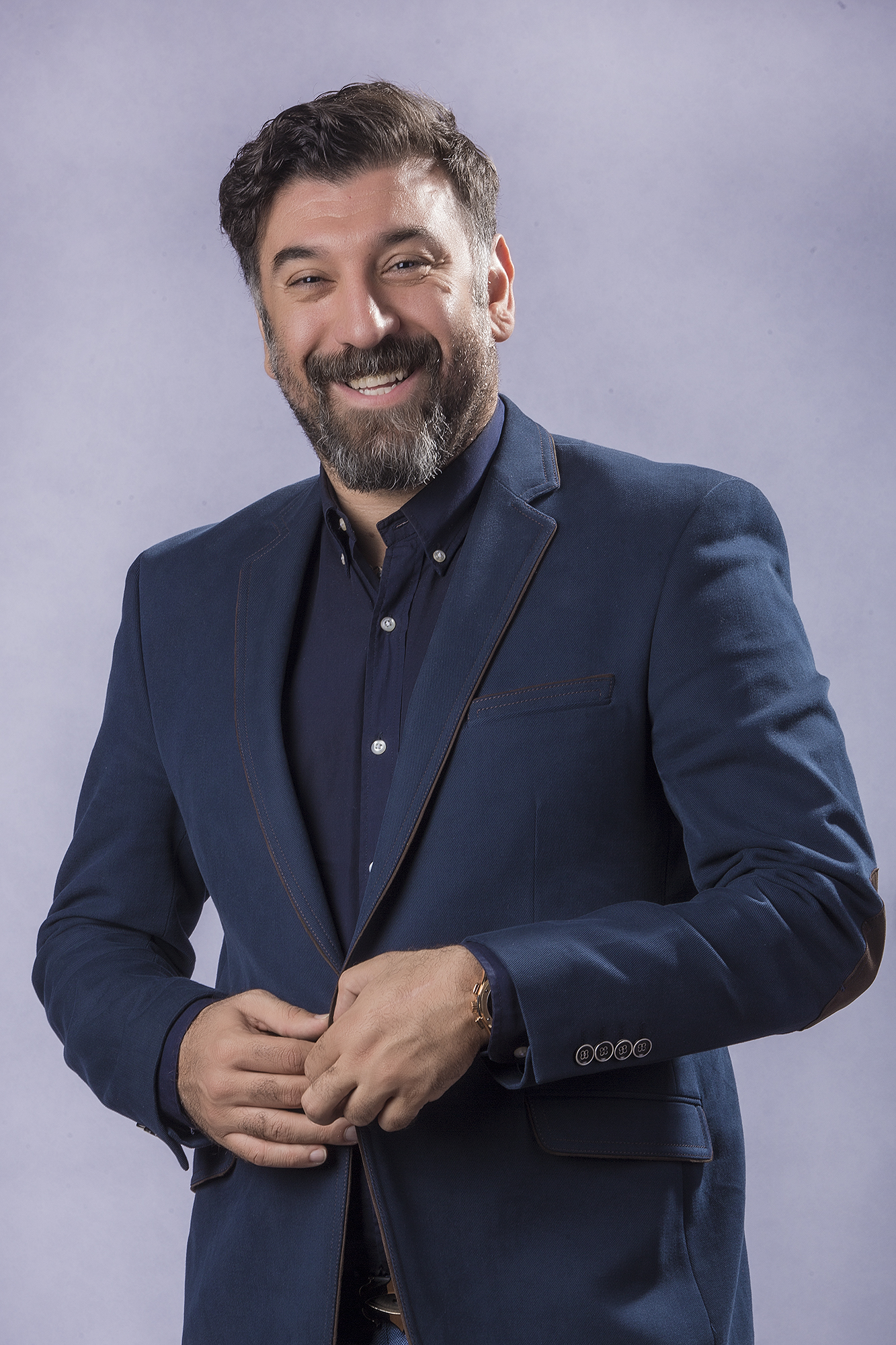
- Ansarian in 2017
- Born: 5 July 1977; Tehran, Pahlavi Iran
- Died: 3 February 2021 (aged 43); Tehran, Iran
- Occupations: Footballer; actor; producer; presenter
- Years active: 2010–2021
Association football career
- Height: 1.86 m (6 ft 1 in)
- Position: Defender
Youth career
- 1990–1992: Payam Tehran
- 1992–1993: Bank Sepah
- 1993–1996: Bank Melli Tehran
- 1996: Fajr Sepah
Senior career*
Years	Team	Apps	(Gls)
1996–1998	Fajr Sepasi	20	(2)
1998–2003	Persepolis	88	(10)
2003–2004	Saipa	6	(0)
2004–2006	Persepolis	48	(11)
2006–2007	Esteghlal	23	(4)
2007–2008	Steel Azin	20	(2)
2008–2009	Esteghlal Ahvaz	14	(0)
2009–2010	Gostaresh Foolad	13	(0)
2010–2011	Shahrdari Tabriz	18	(0)
2011–2012	Shahin Bushehr	10	(0)
Total		260	(29)
International career
1998–2007	Iran	6	(0)
- * Club domestic league appearances and goals

Ali Ansarian (Persian: علی انصاریان; 5 July 1977 – 3 February 2021) was an Iranian professional footballer, actor and presenter. His uncle, Hossein, is a famous Shia cleric.

== Club career ==
After playing for Persepolis F.C. for several seasons, in July 2006 Ansarian joined the club's fierce rival, Esteghlal F.C. On 22 July 2007, he signed with Azadegan League Steel Azin F.C. for reportedly $150,000. After one season playing in a lower league, he returned to the Iran Pro League.

== International career ==
Ansarian had a few short call-ups to the national team. He made his debut for Iran in October 1998 against Kuwait.

== Death ==
After struggling almost two weeks with COVID-19 and suffering from medical side effects and organ failures, Ansarian died at Farhikhtegan Hospital in Tehran on 3 February 2021, at age 43.

== Career statistics ==
Appearances and goals by club, season and competition
Club	Season	League			Hazfi Cup		Asia		Total	
Club	Season	Division	Apps	Goals	Apps	Goals	Apps	Goals	Apps	Goals
Persepolis	1998–99	Azadegan	9	1	4	0	0	0	13	1
Persepolis	1999–00	Azadegan	17	0	2	0	4	0	23	0
Persepolis	2000–01	Azadegan	19	1	1	0	9	1	29	2
Persepolis	2001–02	Pro League	22	3	3	2	-	-	25	5
Persepolis	2002–03	Pro League	21	5			3	0	24	5
Persepolis	Total		88	10	10	2	16	1	114	13
Saipa	2003–04	Pro League	6	0			-	-		
Persepolis	2004–05	Pro League	22	2			-	-		
Persepolis	2005–06	Pro League	26	9			-	-		
Persepolis	Total		48	11					48	11
Esteghlal	2006–07	Pro League	23	4			-	-		
Steel Azin	2007–08	Division 1	20	2			-	-		
Esteghlal Ahvaz	2008–09	Pro League	14	0			-	-		
Gostaresh	2009–10	Division 1	12	0			-	-		
Gostaresh	2010–11	Division 1	1	0	0	0	-	-	1	0
Gostaresh	Total		13	0					13	0
Shahrdari Tabriz	2010–11	Pro League	18	0	0	0	-	-	18	0
Shahin	2011–12	Pro League	10	0	2	0	-	-	12	0
Career total			240	27	12	2	16	1	268	30

== Honours ==
Persepolis

- Iranian Football League (3): 1998–99, 1999–2000, 2001–02
- Hazfi Cup (1): 1998–99

Shahin Bushehr

- Hazfi Cup: runner-up 2012

== Filmography ==
=== Film ===
Year	Title	Director			
2021	Urgent Cut off	Maryam Bahrololumi			
2020	Kulbard	Milad Mansouri	2020	BPM Band	Farnaz Amini
Red Rose	Morteza AtashZamzam		2020		
Bank Zadeha	Javad Ardakani		2020		
After the Incident	Pouria Heidary Oureh		2020		
2019	Emad and Tuba Romanticism	Kaveh Sabbaghzadeh	2020		
2018	Wives Club	Mehdi Sabbaghzadeh			
2018	Azhdar	Reza Sobhani			
2018	The Lock	Ali Javan			
2017	Captain Amir	Saeed Chari			
2017	My City	Seyyed Ali Niakan			
2017	Just sound remains				
2017	BandAid				
2017	Returnee				
2017	Love and Adultery	Mohammad Abdizadeh			
2016	Good feeling of life	Farnaz Amini			
2016	Two Days to Stay	Ammar Khatti			
2015	Judgement of Shot	Rahim Behboudifar			
2015	Second				
2015	The Beginning of an End	Arash Taghva Shoar			
2014	The Gift	Amir Ahmad Ansari			
2014	Skein	Shahram Shah Hosseini			
2014	Burning	‌Behrang Tofighi			
2006	Reward of Silence	Maziyar Miri			

=== Television ===
Year	Title	Director
2020	Intrusive	Bahador Asadi
2020	87 meters	Kianoush Ayyari
2017	Convicts	Hossein Ghena'at
2015	Kimia	Javad Afshar
2015	Friendly Cuisine	Farid Nickjoo
2012	Rental House	Shahed Ahmadlou
2007	Char Khooneh	Soroush Sehhat
2004	The buds of dawn	
2003	The Dots	Mehran Modiri
2002	Under the City's Skin	Mehran Ghafourian

=== Home-video series ===
Year	Film	Director
2015	Aspirin	Farhad Najafi
2019	Iranian Dinner	Mehran Ghafourian
2021	Hamrefigh	Shahab Hosseini

=== TV programs ===
- Zabiwaka (2016) AIO Internet TV
- Varzeshgah (2017) Channel Five
- Mench Competition (2009) Channel Five
- Panorama Internet Program (2020)

== Award ==
- V.i.Z. Film Fest (2021): Best Actor, win, for his role in Koolbarf
