= 1968–69 Tehran Tournament =

1968–69 Tehran Tournament was the competition for determine of Iran's first-ever representative of history in the Asian Club Football Championship. Five Tehran teams competed periodically, including Taj, Oghab, Persepolis, Pas and Shahrbani. In the end of matches, Persepolis became champion with seven points (3 wins and 1 draw) and was introduced to the 1969 Asian Club Championship as Iran's representative.

== Final classification ==
Pos	Club	P	W	D	L	GF	GA	GD	Pts	Qualification
1	Persepolis	4	3	1	0	6	1	5	7	Qualification for the 1969 Asian Champion Club Tournament
2	Taj	4	2	2	0	5	1	4	6	
3	Oghab	4	1	2	1	4	5	–1	4	
4	PAS	4	1	1	2	5	5	0	3	
5	Shahrbani	4	0	0	4	4	12	–8	0	

== Results ==
Match	Date	Home	Result	Away	Source
1	28 November 1968	PAS	4–0	Shahrbani	inf.
2	5 December 1968	Taj	0–0	Oghab	
3	24 December 1968	Shahrbani	0–2	Persepolis	inf.
4	27 December 1968	Oghab	0–0	PAS	inf.
5	29 December 1968	Shahrbani	1–2	Taj	inf.
6	31 December 1968	Persepolis	2–0	Oghab	inf.
7	2 January 1969	Oghab	4–3	Shahrbani	
8	3 January 1969	Taj	3–0 *	PAS	inf.
9	5 January 1969	PAS	1–2	Persepolis	inf.
10	10 January 1969	Persepolis	0–0	Taj	inf.

- In this game, the players of PAS refused to continue the game in protest of the referee's decision in the 40th minute and Taj won 3–0 with the Football Federation technical committee's opinion.

== Top scorers ==
Rank	Player	Club	Goals
1	(Iran) Gholam Vafakhah	Oghab	3
2	(Iran) Habib Alizadeh	Persepolis	2
2	(Iran) Parviz Mirzahassan	PAS	2
