= Shahram Baratpouri =

Iranian footballer

Personal information
- Full name: Shahram Baratpouri
- Place of birth: Iran
- Position: Midfielder

Senior career*
Years	Team	Apps	(Gls)
1996–1998	Payam Mashhad		
1998	Foolad F.C.		
1998–1999	Persepolis		
2004–2005	Sanat Naft Abadan F.C.		
- * Club domestic league appearances and goals as of 27 May 2011

Shahram Baratpouri (Persian: شهرام براتپوری), is a former Iranian football player.

== Club career ==
He previously played for the Payam Mashhad from 1996 to 1998 and Persepolis F.C. from 1995 to 1996 and 1998–1999, Foolad F.C. in 1998. and Sanat Naft Abadan F.C. in 2004–2005
