= Behrouz Rahbarifar =

Iranian footballer

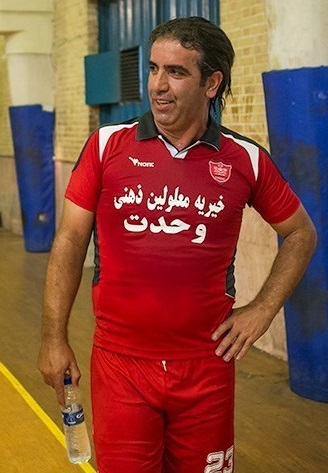

Personal information
- Full name: Behrouz Rahbarifar
- Date of birth: July 17, 1971 (age 55)
- Place of birth: Tehran, Iran
- Height: 1.81 m (5 ft 11 in)
- Position: Defender

Senior career*
Years	Team	Apps	(Gls)
1994–2003	Persepolis	185	(19)
2003–2004	Pas	21	(1)
2004–2006	Persepolis	29	(0)
Total		235	(20)

International career
1999–2001	Iran	24	(0)

Managerial career
- 2007–2008: Steel Azin (assistant)
- 2008–2011: Shahin Bushehr (assistant)
- * Club domestic league appearances and goals

Behrouz Rahbarifar (Persian: بهروز رهبری‌فر, born July 17, 1971, in Tehran) is a retired Iranian football player.

== Club career ==
Rahbarifar Joined Persepolis in 1993 under Ali Parvin, playing 9 seasons with them. at the beginning of 2003–04 season, Akbar Ghamkhar became chairman of the club and he decided to make reformations and players such as Rahbarifar who had good relations with Ali Parvin, were not included in his schemes. So Rahbarifar left the club and joined Pas. Rahbarifar scored his only goal for Pas against Persepolis from a penalty kick.

== Career statistics ==
=== Club ===
Club performance			League		Cup		Continental		Total	
Season	Club	League	Apps	Goals	Apps	Goals	Apps	Goals	Apps	Goals
Iran			League		Hazfi Cup		Asia		Total	
1994–95	Persepolis	Azadegan League	12	0	–		–		16^{1}	0
1995–96	Persepolis	Azadegan League	30	2	–		–		36^{2}	2
1996–97	Persepolis	Azadegan League	25	1	0	0	7	0	35^{3}	1
1997–98^{4}	Persepolis	Azadegan League	8	0	1	1	7	1	16	2
1998–99	Persepolis	Azadegan League	22	1	7	2	–		29	3
1999–00	Persepolis	Azadegan League	19	0	1	1	6	0	26	1
2000–01	Persepolis	Azadegan League	11	7	1	0	8	1	20	8
2001–02	Persepolis	Iran Pro League	20	3	3	0	–		23	3
2002–03	Persepolis	Iran Pro League	19	0	2	0	3	0	24	0
2003–04	Pas	Iran Pro League	21	1	1	0	–		22	0
2004–05	Persepolis	Iran Pro League	20	0	1	0	–		21	1
2005–06	Persepolis	Iran Pro League	9	0	2	0	–		11	0
Career total			216	15	19	4	31	2		21

- ^{1} includes 2 matches in Tehran Hazfi Cup and 2 matches in Bushehr Basij Festival.
- ^{2} includes 2 matches in Naghsh-e-Jahan Cup and 4 Friendlies.
- ^{3} includes 3 matches in Naghsh-e-Jahan Cup.
- ^{4} Persepolis withdrew in 1997–98 League in the middle of season.

=== International ===
Appearances and goals by national team and year
National team	Year	Apps	Goals
Iran	1999	1	0
Iran	2000	14	0
Iran	2001	10	0
Total		25	0

== Honours ==
Persepolis

- Iranian Football League (4): 1995–96, 1996–97, 1998–99, 1999–2000
- Hazfi Cup (1): 1998–99

Pas

- Iranian Football League (1): 2003–04
