= Omid Sharifinasab =

Iranian footballer

Personal information
- Full name: Omid Sharifinasab
- Date of birth: May 22, 1977 (age 49)
- Place of birth: Khuzestan, Iran
- Height: 1.83 m (6 ft 0 in)
- Position: Midfielder

Team information
- Current team: Sanat Naft (assistant)

Senior career*
Years	Team	Apps	(Gls)
1995–2001	Sanat Naft		
2001–2005	Foolad	?	(4)
2005–2010	Saipa	147	(14)
2010–2012	Sanat Naft	58	(5)

Managerial career
- 2012–: Sanat Naft (assistant)
- * Club domestic league appearances and goals

Omid Sharifinasab (Persian: امید شریفی نسب, born May 22, 1977) is a retired Iranian footballer and coach who last played for Sanat Naft in Iran Pro League and now is assistant coach of the club.

He played for Saipa in the 2008 AFC Champions League group stages.

== Club career ==
=== Club career statistics ===
As of 13 June 2012

Club performance			League		Cup		Continental		Total	
Season	Club	League	Apps	Goals	Apps	Goals	Apps	Goals	Apps	Goals
Iran			League		Hazfi Cup		Asia		Total	
2001–02	Foolad	Persian Gulf Cup		2			-	-		
2002–03	Foolad	Persian Gulf Cup	25	0			-	-		
2003–04	Foolad	Persian Gulf Cup	24	1			-	-		
2004–05	Foolad	Persian Gulf Cup	28	1			-	-		
2005–06	Saipa	Persian Gulf Cup	28	4			-	-		
2006–07	Saipa	Persian Gulf Cup	28	3			-	-		
2007–08	Saipa	Persian Gulf Cup	31	3			7	0		
2008–09	Saipa	Persian Gulf Cup	29	3	1	0	-	-	30	3
2009–10	Saipa	Persian Gulf Cup	31	1	1	0	-	-	32	1
2010–11	Sanat Naft	Persian Gulf Cup	32	5	0	0	-	-	32	5
2011–12	Sanat Naft	Persian Gulf Cup	24	0	2	0	-	-	26	0
Career total										

- Assist Goals

Season	Team	Assists
05–06	Saipa	4
06–07	Saipa	6
07–08	Saipa	2
08–09	Saipa	5
09–10	Saipa	2
10–11	Sanat Naft	1
11–12	Sanat Naft	1
