= Ahmad Reza Abedzadeh =

Iranian footballer (born 1966)

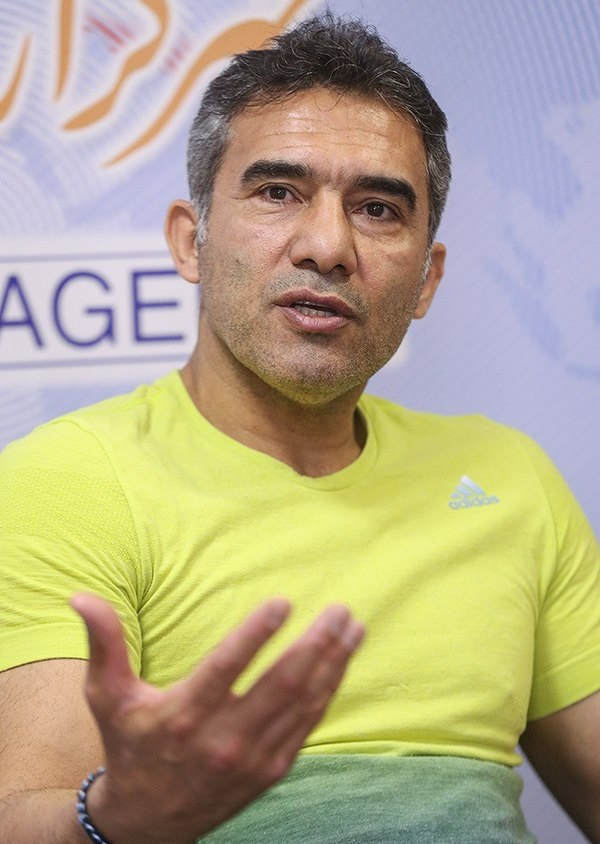
- Abedzadeh in 2017

Personal information
- Full name: Ahmad Reza Abedzadeh
- Date of birth: 25 May 1966 (age 60)
- Place of birth: Abadan, Iran
- Height: 1.90 m (6 ft 3 in)
- Position: Goalkeeper

Senior career*
Years	Team	Apps	(Gls)
1983–1985	Helal ahmar Esfahan	42	(0)
1985–1987	Montakhab Isfahan	37	(0)
1987–1989	Gendarmerie Tehran	39	(0)
1989–1990	Tam Isfahan		
1990–1993	Esteghlal	58	(0)
1993–1994	Sepahan	1	(0)
1994–2001	Persepolis	208	(1)

International career
1987–1998	Iran	79	(0)
- * Club domestic league appearances and goals

Ahmadreza Abedzadeh (Persian: احمدرضا عابدزاده, born 25 May 1966) is an Iranian former footballer who played as a goalkeeper. He played for Esteghlal, Sepahan, Persepolis and the Iranian national team. He made 73 appearances for Iran, and played for his country at the 1998 FIFA World Cup.

== Club career ==
Abedzadeh had an unbeaten record in the Tehran derby with 13 matches, seven wins and six draws. While playing for Persepolis, he went 802 consecutive minutes without conceding a goal.

== International career ==
Abedzadeh was called up at 18 for the Iran national under-20 team in 1984. After his good shows, he was invited to the senior team in 1987 by then-manager Parviz Dehdari. Abedzadeh debuted in the match against Kuwait on 27 February 1987, in which he conceded a goal in a 2–1 victory. He started in the 1990 Asian Games, where they won the gold medal after defeating North Korea in the final and Abedzadeh saved two penalties. At the tournament, he conceded only two goals scored from penalty kicks.

Iran defeated Australia in the FIFA World Cup qualification play-offs to reach 1998 FIFA World Cup, their second participation in the World Cup and first since 1978. He missed the first match at the World Cup against Yugoslavia due to injury, then captained Iran at the next two games against United States and Germany. Iran finished third in their group and Abedzadeh announced his retirement from international football after the final match.

== Post-playing career ==
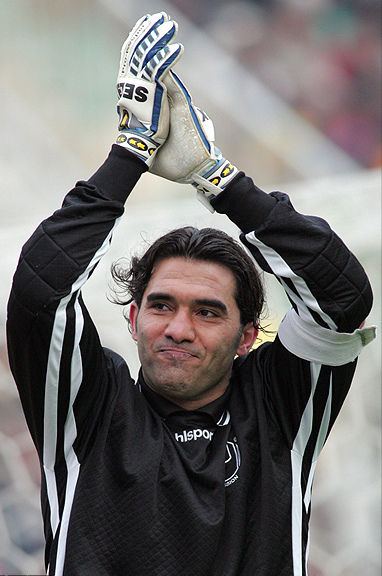
Abedzadeh in 2006

Abedzadeh suffered a stroke in 2001 and that was the point in which he let go of professional football. He was released some weeks later, but required several surgeries after, and even to this day, has side effects from his stroke. Abedzadeh suffered again on 11 March 2007 when his mother died.

He has also been the goalkeeping coach for many clubs after retiring from playing football. He coached Saipa in 2001, Esteghlal Ahvaz in 2005, Persepolis from 2008 to 2009, Steel Azin in 2010 and Los Angeles Blues from 2011 to 2012.

== Legacy ==
Dubbed the Eagle of Asia for his ability to protect the net, Abedzadeh's international career stretched for 11 years. In 2009, he was named in a poll as Iran's favorite player of last 30 years. His goalkeeping legacy in Iran is rivaled only by Nasser Hejazi.

== Personal life ==
Abedzadeh married in 1988 and has one daughter, Negar, and one son, Amir, who is also a goalkeeper and plays for Castellón and the Iran national team. Abedzadeh also runs a restaurant in Motelghoo, one of the cities of Northern Iran.

On 6 January 2026, Abedzadeh publicly supported the 2025–2026 Iranian protests on his Instagram, stating: "This situation is not the right of the noble people of Iran. Living in prosperity, security, happiness, and economic stability is the inalienable right of the Iranian people."

== Honours ==
=== Club ===
Esteghlal

- Iranian Football League: 1989–90
- Asian Club Championship: 1990–91, runner up: 1991

Persepolis

- Iranian Football League: 1995–96, 1996–97, 1998–99, 1999–2000
- Hazfi Cup: 1998–99

=== National ===
Iran

- Asian Games Gold Medal: 1990
