= Edmond Bezik =

Iranian footballer and manager

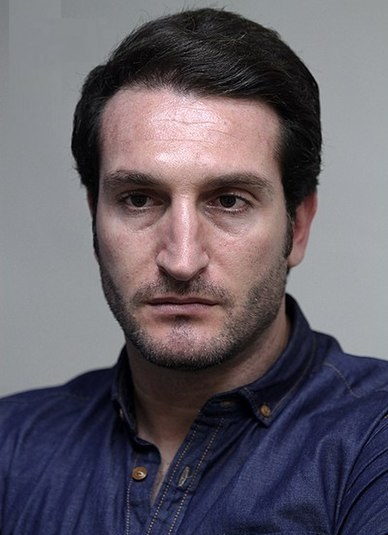
- Bezik in 2013

Personal information
- Full name: Edmond Bezik
- Date of birth: 12 August 1975 (age 51)
- Place of birth: Tehran, Iran
- Position: Forward

Youth career
- 1990–1994: Ararat Tehran

Senior career*
Years	Team	Apps	(Gls)
1994–1996	Ararat Tehran		(22)
1996–2001	Persepolis	133	(40)
2001–2006	Sepahan		(30)
2006–2007	Shahrdari Bandar Abbas		(1)
2007–2009	Ararat Tehran		

International career^{‡}
1999–2005	Iran	7	(0)

Managerial career
- 2015–2016: Ararat Tehran
- 2017–2018: KIA Academy
- * Club domestic league appearances and goals as of 14 December 2009 ‡ National team caps and goals as of 2 July 2005

Edmond Bezik (Persian: ادموند بزيک; Armenian: Էդմունդ Բազիկյան, born 12 August 1975 in Tehran, Iran) is a retired Armenian-Iranian footballer and coach. He played for Persepolis, Sepahan and Ararat Tehran and was a member of Iran national football team. He is currently head coach of Persepolis's under-23 team.

== Club career ==
Bezik originally started his play in the FC Ararat Tehran, which has a policy of recruiting young Iranian footballers of Armenian ancestry. There he was noticed for his impressive finishing skills, and was soon transferred to Persepolis Tehran. There he was able to please fans and scored some memorable goals. Arguably his most memorable game may have been in 1996 during the Tehran derby between Persepolis FC and Esteghlal. Persepolis had not beaten Esteghlal for seven seasons, but Bezik was able to score the last minute winner in that match to claim a spot in many Persepolis fan's hearts.

Success was short-lived though and after a couple of very poor seasons, he along with many other Persepolis players were let go from the team. Bezik was immediately signed by Foolad Sepahan. His move to Isfahan was just what his career needed. In the 2002–03 season of the IPL, Bezik became the league's top goalscorer with 13 goals, and led the team to the league championship. He was deservedly called up to the national team and was starting to make his way into the squad when he became injured. He has come back from his injury but has not been able to score consistently. When new Sepahan manager, Luka Bonačić was hired, he deemed that Bezik was not needed for the squad.

Bezik signed a one-year contract with Azadegan League outfit, Shahrdari Bandar Abbas, with whom he will be playing until the end of the 2006–07 season.

Bezik's work ethic, and hard work is always a positive point for his clubs.

=== Top goalscorer ===
Having scored 22 goals for Ararat, 32 goals for Persepolis and 30 goals for Sepahan, he scored a total number of 84 goals during his time in Iran's top division football league, becoming the top division's all-time top goalscorer.

== Honours ==
=== Club ===
Persepolis

- Iranian Football League (3): 1996–97, 1998–99, 1999–2000
- Hazfi Cup (1): 1998–99

Sepahan

- Iranian Football League (1): 2002–03
- Hazfi Cup (1): 2003–04

=== Individual ===
- Iran Pro League Top Goalscorer: 2002–03
