= Reza Torabian =

Iranian footballer and coach

Personal information
- Full name: Reza Torabian
- Date of birth: 8 May 1970 (age 56)
- Place of birth: Ray, Iran
- Positions: Centre-back; forward

Senior career*
Years	Team	Apps	(Gls)
1994	Bank Tejarat		
1995–1997	Persepolis		
1997–1998	Balestier Central	1	(0)
1998–1999	Standard Liège		
1999–2005	Pas		

International career
1996–1998	Iran	2	(0)
- * Club domestic league appearances and goals

Reza Torabian (Persian: رضا ترابیان; born 28 June 1971 in ) is a retired Iranian footballer and coach who was most recently the assistant manager at Persepolis.
