= Hassan Shirmohammadi =

Iranian footballer

Personal information
- Date of birth: May 22, 1968 (age 58)
- Place of birth: Tehran, Iran
- Position: Midfielder

Senior career*
Years	Team	Apps	(Gls)
–1989	Boutan		
1989–1992	Persepolis		
1992–1994	Al-Ittihad		
1994–1995	Persepolis		
1995–1996	Pas Tehran		
1996–1999	Saipa		
1999–2000	Shanghai Pudong		

International career
1992	Iran national futsal team		
1994	Iran national football team	2	(0)
- * Club domestic league appearances and goals

Hassan Shirmohammadi (Persian: حسن شیرمحمدی; born May 22, 1968, in Tehran) is a retired Iranian football player.
