= Mohannad Mahdi Al-Nadawi =

Iraqi footballer

Mohanned Mehdi Al-Nadawi
Personal information
- Full name: Mohanned Mehdi Al-Nadawi
- Date of birth: 1975 (age 50–51)
- Place of birth: Kut, Iraq
- Position: Striker

Senior career*
Years	Team	Apps	(Gls)
1990–1993	Al-Kut		
1993–1994	Al-Karkh		
1995–1996	Al-Naft		
1996–1997	Al-Zawraa		
1997–1998	Al-Talaba		
1998–1999	Dohuk FC		
1999–2004	Sanat Naft Abadan F.C.		
2004–2005	Diyala FC		
2005–2007	Al-Kut		
- * Club domestic league appearances and goals

Mohannad Mahdi Al-Nadawi or Mohanned Mehdi Al-Nadawi (Arabic: مهند مهدی الندوی) an Iraqi footballer. He is the first foreign footballer who became the Top Goal Scorer in Iranian Football League. In the 1999/2000 season, he scored a total of 14 goals, ahead of Iranian super goal scorers Behnam Seraj and Hamid Reza Ebrahimi.
