= Vahid Ghelich =

Iranian footballer

Personal information
- Date of birth: December 16, 1957 (age 68)
- Place of birth: Tehran, Iran
- Position: Goalkeeper

Senior career*
Years	Team	Apps	(Gls)
1980–1992	Persepolis	185	(0)
1992–1994	Poora	47	(0)

International career
1989	Iran	1	(0)
1992	Iran national futsal team		(0)
- * Club domestic league appearances and goals

Vahid Ghelich (Persian: وحید قلیچ) and also Qlich born on December 16, 1957, in Tehran is a retired Iranian footballer. He was Persepolis Goalkeeper for more than a decade. During his career he played for Persepolis and Poora. He is the most capped Goalkeeper in the Persepolis history for 12 years. He has also been in the Iran national football team. Vahid Ghelich has played about 180 games for Persepolis. He has saved 4 important penalties in the matches of Persepolis vs. Esteghlal. In 2 matches against the blue team his jaw was broken and in another match, his fingers were broken as a biased goal keeper.

He started his senior career at Persepolis and is considered to be a member of a Golden Generation of players at the club. He remained there for 12 years before moving to Poora.

After retirement, he became Persepolis goal keepers' coach in 2000. He has also found talent and introduced Alireza Haghighi, the recent Iran national football team goal keeper to Iran's football in the new generation.
