= Afshin Peyrovani =

Iranian footballer and coach

Afshin Peyravani
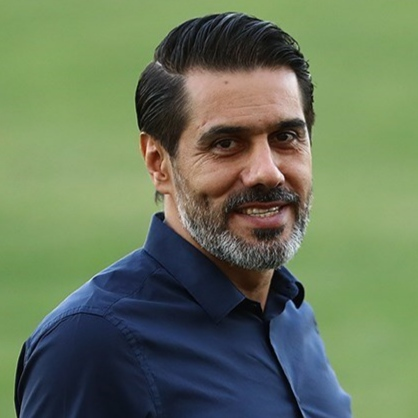

Personal information
- Full name: Mohammad Ali Peyrovani
- Date of birth: 6 February 1970 (age 56)
- Place of birth: Shiraz, Iran
- Height: 1.81 m (5 ft 11 1/2 in)
- Position: Defender

Team information
- Current team: Persepolis (team manager)

Youth career
- 1986–1987: Bargh Shiraz

Senior career*
Years	Team	Apps	(Gls)
1987–1990	Bargh Shiraz		
1990–1993	Bank Tejarat		
1993–1996	Persepolis		
1996–1997	Al-Sadd		
1997–2004	Persepolis	209	(14)
2004–2005	Paykan	17	(0)

International career
1993–2002	Iran	66	(0)

Managerial career
- 2008–2009: Persepolis
- 2010: Steel Azin
- 2010: Steel Azin
- 2012–2013: Sang Ahan
- * Club domestic league appearances and goals

Mohammad Ali "Afshin" Peyrovani (Persian: افشين پیروانی, born 6 February 1970) is a retired Iranian footballer and a football coach. He is the younger brother of Gholam Peyrovani and Amir Hossein Peyrovani.

A former Iran national, he played in the 1998 World Cup, as well as the team that finished third in the 1996 Asian Cup.

A versatile player, Peyrovani played in several positions throughout his career, including as a central defender and right defender. Throughout his club career, he played for Perspolis and Peykan and won Iran League for Fifth time. Following his retirement, he also served as a manager and Football Director for Perspolis.

== Playing career ==
=== Club career ===
Peyrovani was a product of the Persepolis youth academy. On 1 August 1993 he was signed by the first team where he spent 10 years of his playing career, making over 200 appearances. On 29 August 2004 he moved to Paykan Tehran F.C. on a one-year deal. Peyrovani ended his career at the end of the IPL 2004/05 season.

=== Club career statistics ===
As of 3 June 2017

Club performance			League		Cup		Continental		Total	
Season	Club	League	Apps	Goals	Apps	Goals	Apps	Goals	Apps	Goals
Iran			League		Hazfi Cup		Asia		Total	
1993–94	Persepolis	Azadegan League	4	0	0	0	0	0	4	0
1994–95	Persepolis	Azadegan League	6	0	0	0	0	0	6	0
1995–96	Persepolis	Azadegan League	21	0	0	0	0	0	21	0
1996–97	Persepolis	Azadegan League	20	1						
1997–98	Persepolis	Azadegan League	8	1						
1998–99	Persepolis	Azadegan League	24	0						
1999–00	Persepolis	Azadegan League	25	1	2	0	3	0	26	1
2000–01	Persepolis	Azadegan League	21	2	3	1	0	0	24	3
2001–02	Persepolis	Persian Gulf Cup	24	1			-	-		
2002–03	Persepolis	Persian Gulf Cup	23	1			3	0		
2003–04	Persepolis	Persian Gulf Cup	20	2			-	-		
2004–05	Paykan	Persian Gulf Cup	17	0	0	0	-	-	17	0
Total	Iran		213	9	0	0	6	0	17	0
Career total			213	9	5	1	6	0		

=== International career ===
He has 66 caps for the Iran national football team and was a participant at the 1998 FIFA World Cup.

== Coaching career ==
After the departure of Afshin Ghotbi in November 2008 he was appointed as the head coach of Persepolis F.C. and was replaced and became the assistant coach of Nelo Vingada in mid February 2009 and a month later he was sacked totally by the chairman. He replaced Hamid Estili as the head coach of Steel Azin on 19 April 2010 and later on for the season after he was again appointed as the head coach of the team again which after poor results he resigned. On 6 November 2012, he was appointed as head coach of Azadegan League side Sang Ahan Bafq.

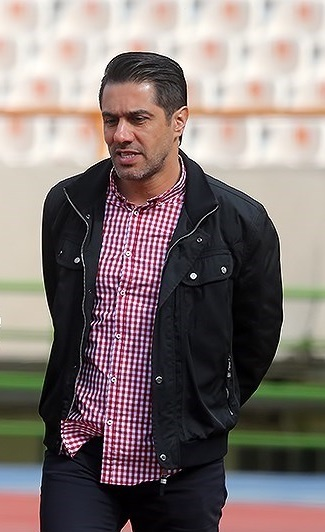
Peyrovani in 2014

As of 11 December 2010

Nat	Team	From	To	Record							
Nat	Team	From	To	G	W	D	L	Win %	GF	GA	+/-
(Iran)	Persepolis	18 November 2008	16 February 2009	12	7	3	2	58.3%	20	10	+10
(Iran)	Steel Azin	14 October 2010	23 November 2010	8	2	2	4	25%	7	17	−10
Total				20	9	5	6	45%	27	27	0

== Director career ==
=== Iran National Football Team ===
In September 2015, Peyrovani was appointed as director of Tean national football team. He was included in Carlos Queiroz staff for 2018 World Cup Qualifying Asia. After a while, he tendered his resignation as sporting director and left the Iran football team. In 2018, the disciplinary committee of the Iranian Football Federation suspended Peyrovani from all football activities for a period of five years due to financial irregularities.

=== Perspolis ===
Peyrovani in December 2017 introduced as new director of football of Persepolis, being responsible for the club's major transfer market decisions.

== Honours ==
=== Club ===
Persepolis

- Iranian Football League:
  - Winner (5): 1995–96, 1996–97, 1998–99, 1999–00, 2001–02
  - Runner-up (2): 1993–94, 2000–01
- Hazfi Cup:
  - Winner (1): 1998–99
