= Ali Baghmisheh =

Iranian footballer

Personal information
- Full name: Ali Baghmisheh
- Date of birth: 8 September 1975 (age 51)
- Place of birth: Tabriz, Iran
- Position: Forward

Youth career
- –1996: Tractor

Senior career*
| Years | Team | Apps | (Gls) |
| 1996–1998 | Tractor | | |
| 1998–2000 | Persepolis | | |
| 2000–2001 | Paykan | | |
| 2001–2002 | Al-Ittihad | | (2) |
| 2002–2003 | Bargh Shiraz | | |

International career
| 1999 | Iran | 1 | (0) |
- * Club domestic league appearances and goals as of 27 June 2019

Ali Baghmisheh (Persian: علی باغمیشه, born 8 September 1975) is an Iranian former professional footballer, who also played for the Iran national team.
