= 1998–99 Hazfi Cup =

Tournament details
- Country: Iran

Final positions
- Champions: Persepolis (3rd title)
- Runners-up: Esteghlal

The Hazfi Cup 1998–99 (also called the Jam-e-Khafzi Cup) was the 12th edition of Iran's football knockout competition. The tournament is organised annually by the Football Federation Islamic Republic of Iran.

== Semifinals ==
Esteghlal Ahvaz	0–2	Persepolis FC

Ahvaz, Takhti Stadium

Esteghlal Tehran	1–0	Pas Tehran F.C.

Tehran, Azadi Stadium

== Final ==
July 11, 1999

Persepolis FC	2–1	Esteghlal Tehran
Hasheminasab 12' (pen.); Peyrovani 86'		Bakhtiarizadeh 50'

Tehran, Azadi Stadium
