= 1999–2000 Azadegan League =

9th season of Azadegan League

Azadegan League
- Season: 1999–2000
- Champions: Persepolis
- Relegated: Aboomoslem, Sanat Naft, Chooka, Irsotter
- Asian Club Championship: Persepolis
- Asian Cup Winners' Cup: Esteghlal
- Matches: 182
- Top goalscorer: Mohannad Mehdi Al-Nadawi (15)
- Biggest home win: PAS 7–0 Irsotter Noshahr
- Biggest away win: Irsotter 1–5 Persepolis
- Highest scoring: PAS 7–0 Irsotter; Saipa 6–1 Irsotter
- Longest winning run: Esteghlal (5 matches)
- Longest unbeaten run: Persepolis (23 matches)
- Longest winless run: Chooka (11 matches)
- Longest losing run: Irsotter (5 matches)

The 1999–2000 Azadegan League was the ninth season of Iran's premiere professional football league at the time, the Azadegan League. Persepolis became the league champions.

The following are the final results of the Azadegan League's 1999–2000 football season.

== Final classification ==
Pos	Team	Pld	W	D	L	GF	GA	GD	Pts	Qualification or relegation
1	Persepolis (C)	26	15	9	2	45	23	+22	54	Qualification for the 2000–01 Asian Club Championship
2	Esteghlal	26	12	11	3	32	16	+16	47	Qualification for the 2000–01 Asian Cup Winners' Cup
3	Fajr Sepasi	26	11	11	4	37	18	+19	44	
4	Sepahan	26	11	9	6	28	19	+9	42	
5	Zob Ahan	26	11	6	9	35	29	+6	39	
6	Tractor Sazi	26	10	8	8	30	26	+4	38	
7	PAS	26	9	8	9	35	31	+4	35	
8	Bahman	26	8	10	8	24	26	−2	34	
9	Saipa	26	6	13	7	24	21	+3	31	
10	Foolad	26	7	8	11	30	33	−3	29	
11	Aboomoslem (R)	26	7	7	12	32	39	−7	28	Relegation to the 2000–01 Iran 2nd Division
12	Sanat Naft (R)	26	6	9	11	29	35	−6	27	Relegation to the 2000–01 Iran 2nd Division
13	Chooka (R)	26	4	9	13	22	45	−23	21	Relegation to the 2000–01 Iran 2nd Division
14	Irsotter Noshahr (R)	26	3	6	17	22	64	−42	15	Relegation to the 2000–01 Iran 2nd Division

Updated to match(es) played on 1 September 2018. Source: RSSSF
Rules for classification: 1) Points; 2) Goal difference; 3) Goals scored.
(C) Champions; (R) Relegated

== Results table ==
Home \ Away	PRS	EST	FJR	SEP	ZOB	TRK	PAS	BAH	SAP	FOL	ABU	SNA	CHO	IRS
Persepolis		0–0	3–1	1–0	0–2	5–2	3–1	3–1	0–0	2–2	1–1	2–1	3–0	2–0
Esteghlal	0–2		0–0	2–1	2–1	1–1	3–0	0–0	1–1	0–0	1–0	0–0	2–0	2–0
Fajr Sepasi	1–1	3–0		0–0	3–2	1–1	2–1	1–1	2–0	3–0	2–0	2–1	6–0	4–0
Sepahan	0–0	1–4	0–0		0–0	1–0	2–2	1–0	0–0	2–1	3–0	1–0	2–0	3–1
Zob Ahan	1–1	1–4	1–1	0–3		1–0	0–1	2–1	0–0	4–0	4–1	1–2	4–2	3–1
Tractor Sazi	1–1	1–3	2–0	1–1	0–1		1–0	1–0	0–0	2–1	3–1	2–0	2–0	4–1
PAS Tehran	0–1	1–1	0–1	0–2	2–0	1–0		1–1	0–0	3–1	2–2	2–2	2–1	7–0
Bahman	1–1	0–3	0–0	0–1	1–0	0–0	2–1		1–0	1–0	2–1	3–0	1–1	3–1
Saipa	1–2	0–1	1–1	1–2	1–1	2–0	1–2	1–1		1–0	2–3	1–0	1–0	6–1
Foolad	1–2	2–0	0–0	2–1	1–2	1–2	1–1	2–0	1–1		0–0	2–0	4–1	5–1
Aboumoslem	1–2	0–0	1–0	2–0	0–1	2–1	2–3	2–0	0–1	1–2		3–1	1–1	1–1
Sanat Naft	3–0	0–1	1–0	1–1	1–1	1–2	0–0	2–2	1–1	0–0	2–2		3–0	2–1
Chooka	1–2	0–0	0–1	0–0	1–0	1–1	0–1	1–1	1–1	0–0	4–3	3–2		3–1
Irsotter	1–5	1–1	2–2	1–0	0–2	0–0	2–1	0–1	0–0	3–1	0–2	2–3	1–1	

Source: Iran 2000
Legend: Blue = home team win; Yellow = draw; Red = away team win.

== Summary ==
- Iranian football top division champions: Persepolis
- Relegated to 2nd division: Aboomoslem, Sanat Naft, Chooka Talesh, Irsotter Noshahr
- Promoted from the 2nd division: Bargh Shiraz, Esteghlal Rasht

== Player statistics ==
=== Top goalscorers ===
15

- (Iraq) Mohannad Mahdi Al-Nadawi (Sanat Naft)

12

- (Iran) Hamid Ebrahimi (Aboomoslem)

11

- (Iran) Behnam Seraj (Persepolis)

10

- (Iran) Hadi Abdollahzadeh (Aboomoslem)
- (Iran) Mehdi Hasheminasab (Persepolis)
- (Iran) Reza Sahebi (Zob Ahan)
- (Iran) Bahman Tahmasebi (Irsotter) and (Esteghlal)
- (Iran) Omid Zahedi (Foolad)

9

- (Iran) Ali Samereh (Fajr Sepasi)

8

- (Iran) Behnam Abolghasempour (Saipa)
