= 1998–99 Azadegan League =

8th season of Azadegan League

Azadegan League
- Season: 1998–99
- Champions: Persepolis
- Relegated: Malavan Shahrdari Tabriz Polyacryl Bank Melli
- Asian Club Championship: Persepolis
- Asian Cup Winners' Cup: Esteghlal
- Matches: 240
- Biggest home win: Esteghlal 6–1 Chooka
- Biggest away win: Saipa 1–5 Fajr Sepasi
- Highest scoring: Sepahan 5–3 Shahrdari Tabriz
- Longest winning run: Persepolis (14 matches)
- Longest unbeaten run: Esteghlal (15 matches)
- Longest winless run: Bank Melli (16 matches)
- Longest losing run: Zob Ahan, Bank Melli (4 matches)

The 1998–99 Azadegan League was the eighth season of Iran's erstwhile top-level professional football league Azadegan League that was won by Persepolis. The following are the final results of the Azadegan League's 1998–99 football season.

== Final classification ==
Pos	Team	Pld	W	D	L	GF	GA	GD	Pts	Qualification or relegation
1	Persepolis (C)	30	19	8	3	56	21	+35	65	Qualification for the 1999–2000 Asian Club Championship
2	Esteghlal	30	14	11	5	50	28	+22	53	Qualification for the 1999–2000 Asian Cup Winners' Cup
3	Sepahan	30	13	14	3	38	19	+19	53	
4	Saipa	30	13	10	7	43	33	+10	49	
5	PAS	30	9	15	6	30	25	+5	42	
6	Chooka	30	11	7	12	33	48	−15	40	
7	Foolad	30	9	11	10	31	37	−6	38	
8	Aboomoslem	30	10	7	13	37	37	0	37	
9	Sanat Naft	30	8	12	10	22	39	−17	36	
10	Fajr Sepasi	30	8	10	12	27	31	−4	34	
11	Tractor Sazi	30	7	13	10	30	35	−5	34	
12	Zob Ahan	30	9	6	15	23	32	−9	33	
13	Malavan (R)	30	7	11	12	21	26	−5	32	Relegation to the 1999–2000 Iran 2nd Division
14	Sh. Tabriz (R)	30	5	16	9	29	33	−4	31	Relegation to the 1999–2000 Iran 2nd Division
15	Polyacryl (R)	30	5	12	13	24	36	−12	27	Relegation to the 1999–2000 Iran 2nd Division
16	Bank Melli (R)	30	4	15	11	27	41	−14	27	Relegation to the 1999–2000 Iran 2nd Division

Updated to match(es) played on 1 Sep 2018. Source: RSSSF
Rules for classification: 1) Points; 2) Goal difference; 3) Goals scored.
(C) Champions; (R) Relegated

== Results table ==
Home \ Away	PRS	EST	SEP	SAP	PAS	CHO	FOL	ABU	SNA	FJR	TRK	ZOB	MLV	SHT	POL	BMI
Persepolis		1–1	3–1	1–0	1–2	4–0	1–0	1–0	4–1	0–0	0–0	2–0	1–0	3–1	3–0	1–1
Esteghlal	0–1		1–1	3–4	1–1	6–1	3–0	1–2	1–0	2–1	3–2	0–1	1–1	1–0	4–2	3–1
Sepahan	1–0	1–1		1–1	0–0	2–0	1–1	0–0	1–1	1–0	3–1	1–0	1–0	5–3	1–0	1–1
Saipa	1–1	0–0	2–0		0–0	4–1	1–0	2–1	0–0	1–5	1–0	3–1	1–0	1–1	1–0	1–1
PAS Tehran	0–4	1–1	1–1	1–3		1–1	1–1	3–2	0–0	3–1	0–0	0–0	1–0	0–0	2–1	1–1
Chooka	3–1	1–1	1–0	2–2	2–1		1–1	1–0	0–0	2–1	1–0	1–0	2–1	2–1	4–2	2–1
Foolad	0–3	0–3	0–3	3–2	2–1	4–1		1–0	1–1	0–0	1–0	0–2	4–1	0–0	1–1	2–0
Aboumoslem	1–2	1–2	1–1	1–1	0–2	3–0	0–0		6–2	3–1	2–1	2–1	1–0	4–3	1–0	0–3
Sanat Naft	1–4	1–1	0–3	2–0	1–0	1–0	0–3	2–1		0–0	2–2	2–1	0–0	0–3	1–0	2–1
Fajr Sepasi	2–3	0–1	0–2	2–1	0–0	3–1	1–0	1–2	1–2		0–0	1–0	0–2	2–1	0–0	2–1
Tractor Sazi	2–4	1–4	0–2	1–0	1–2	0–0	1–1	2–1	0–0	0–0		1–1	1–0	2–2	3–1	0–0
Zob Ahan	1–1	1–1	0–3	2–1	0–2	1–0	2–3	2–0	2–0	1–0	0–2		1–1	0–0	1–2	0–1
Malavan	1–1	1–2	0–0	2–2	1–2	3–1	2–0	1–1	2–0	0–0	0–0	1–0		1–0	0–0	0–1
Sh. Tabriz	0–0	0–0	1–1	1–3	2–1	1–0	1–1	0–0	0–0	1–1	0–1	1–0	2–0		0–0	1–1
Polyacryl	0–2	1–0	0–0	0–1	0–0	0–0	3–0	1–0	2–0	0–0	1–1	0–2	0–1	2–2		2–2
Bank Melli	1–2	0–2	0–0	0–3	0–0	3–2	1–1	0–0	0–0	1–2	1–4	0–3	0–0	1–1	3–3	

Source: iran99
Legend: Blue = home team win; Yellow = draw; Red = away team win.

== Summary ==
- Iranian football champions: Persepolis
- Relegated: Malavan, Shahrdari Tabriz, Poly Acryl, Bank Melli
- Promoted: Bahman, Irsotter Noshahr

== Player statistics ==
=== Top goalscorers ===
14

- Kourosh Barmak (Teraktor Sazi)
- Abdoljalil Golcheshmeh (Aboomoslem)
