= 2002–03 Persepolis F.C. season =

Persepolis
2002–03 season
- Chairman: Akbar Ghamkhar
- Manager: Ali Parvin
- Stadium: Azadi Stadium
- Iran Pro League: 3rd
- Hazfi Cup: Round of 16
- ACL: Group stage
- Top goalscorer: League: Ali Ansarian; Payan Rafat (5 goals); All: Payan Rafat (6 goals)
- Highest home attendance: 60,000 (10 January 2003 against Esteghlal)
- Lowest home attendance: 5,000 (6 April 2003 against Aboumoslem)
- Average home league attendance: 17,077
Home colours	Away colours

The 2002–03 season was Persepolis's second season in the Pro League, and their 20th consecutive season in the top division of Iranian Football. They also competed in the Hazfi Cup and AFC Champions League. Persepolis was captained by Afshin Peyrovani.

== Squad ==
As of October 2002. Note: Flags indicate national team as defined under FIFA eligibility rules; some limited exceptions apply. Players may hold more than one non-FIFA nationality.

No.	Pos.	Nation	Player
1	GK	IRI	Davoud Fanaei
2	DF	IRI	Mohammad Barzegar
3	DF	IRI	Hassan Khanmohammadi
4	DF	IRI	Younes Bahonar
5	DF	IRI	Afshin Peyrovani (captain)
6	MF	IRI	Karim Bagheri
8	DF	IRI	Ali Ansarian
9	MF	IRI	Mehdi Tartar
10	MF	IRI	Pejman Jamshidi
11	FW	IRI	Amirhossein Aslanian
12	MF	IRI	Aref Mohammadvand
13	DF	IRI	Mojtaba Shiri
14	MF	IRI	Reza Jabbari
15	MF	IRI	Mehrdad Minavand

No.	Pos.	Nation	Player
16	DF	IRI	Reza Shahroudi (Vice captain)
17	FW	IRI	Sohrab Entezari
18	FW	IRI	Behnam Abolghasempour
19	FW	IRI	Payan Rafat
20	DF	IRI	Behrouz Rahbarifard (3rd captain)
21	MF	IRI	Ebrahim Asadi
22	GK	IRI	Mohammad Mohammadi
23	FW	IRI	Ali Salmani
24	FW	IRI	Ali Lashgari
25	MF	IRI	Hamid Estili
26	MF	IRI	Hadi Mahdavikia
27	FW	IRI	Ehsan Khorsandi
28	DF	IRI	Yahya Golmohammadi
30	GK	IRI	Farshid Karimi

== Transfers ==
=== In ===
No	P	Name	Age	Moving from	Transfer fee	Type	Transfer window	Source
6	DM	Karim Bagheri	31	(Qatar) Al Sadd	–	Free Transfer	Summer	
12	DM	Aref Mohammadvand	32	Zob Ahan	–	Free Transfer	Summer	
13	CB	Mojtaba Shiri	22	Bargh Shiraz	–	Free Transfer	Summer	
15	LW	Mehrdad Minavand	26	(United Arab Emirates) Al Shabab	–	Free Transfer	Summer	
19	CF	Payan Rafat	32	(United Arab Emirates) Hatta	–	Free Transfer	Summer	
23	RW	Ali Salmani	23	Bargh Tehran	$28,000	Transfer	Summer	
26	RW	Hadi Mahdavikia	21	(Germany) Hamburger SV II	–	Free Transfer	Summer	
28	CB	Yahya Golmohammadi	31	Foolad	$70,000	Transfer	Summer	

=== Out ===
No	P	Name	Age	Moving to	Transfer fee	Type	Transfer window	Source
10	CM	Hamed Kavianpour	24	(United Arab Emirates) Al Wasl	undisclosed	Transfer	Summer	
22	GK	Mohammadreza Jounakizadeh		Esteghlal Ahvaz	–	Free Transfer	Summer	
15	DM	Esmaeil Halali	29	Sanat Naft	–	Free Transfer	Summer	
23	CF	Laith Nobari	25	Released		Contract expiration	Summer	
	CM	Javad Razzaghi	20	(Slovakia) Dunajská Streda	–	Free Transfer	Summer	

== Technical staff ==
Position	Staff
Head coach	(Iran) Ali Parvin
Assistant coach	(Iran) Nasser Ebrahimi
First Team coach	(Germany) Hans-Dieter Schmidt
Physical fitness trainer	(Iran) Parviz Komasi
Goalkeeping coach	(Iran) Vahid Ghelich
Doctor	(Iran) Dr Farid Zarineh
Team Manager	(Iran) Mahmoud Khordbin

== Competition record ==
Competition	Record							
Competition	G	W	D	L	GF	GA	GD	Win %
Iran Pro League	26	11	11	4	30	21	+9	42.31
Hazfi Cup	4	3	0	1	4	2	+2	75.00
AFC Champions League	3	2	0	1	5	2	+3	66.67
Total	33	16	11	6	39	25	+14	48.48

=== Iran Pro League ===
==== Standings ====
Pos	Team	Pld	W	D	L	GF	GA	GD	Pts	Qualification or relegation
1	Sepahan (C)	26	16	4	6	47	27	+20	52	Qualification for the 2004 AFC Champions League
2	Pas	26	13	6	7	37	23	+14	45	
3	Persepolis	26	11	11	4	30	21	+9	44	
4	Fajr	26	11	9	6	28	21	+7	42	
5	Paykan	26	10	7	9	27	24	+3	37	

Source: IPL Stats, Soccerway
Rules for classification: 1) Points; 2) Goal difference; 3) Goals scored.
(C) Champions

== Competitions ==
=== Iran Pro League ===
Win Draw Loss Postponed

Date Round	Home	Score	Away	Location

18 October 2002 1	Bargh Shiraz	1 – 2	Persepolis	Shiraz
	A. Baghmisheh 26'; S. Zare (yellow card) 45'; A. Abbasfard (red card) 54'; M. Shiri (yellow card) 60'	Stats	R. Jabbari 43', 78'; K. Bagheri (yellow card) 70'; S. Entezari (yellow card) 80'	Stadium: Hafezieh Stadium; Attendance: 25,000

25 October 2002 2	Persepolis	1 – 0	Paykan	Tehran
	A. Mohammadvand (yellow card) 35'; A. Aslanian 90'	Stats	H. Memar (yellow card) 74'	Stadium: Takhti Stadium; Attendance: 25,000

1 November 2002 3	Saipa	1 – 1	Persepolis	Tehran
	J. Kazemian 47'	Stats	S. Entezari 49'	Stadium: Takhti Stadium; Attendance: 25,000

5 November 2002 4	Persepolis	0 – 1	Zob Ahan	Tehran
	A. Ansarian (yellow card) 65'	Stats	M. Hosseini (yellow card) 34'; A. Vaziri 90' (yellow card) 90'	Stadium: Takhti Stadium; Attendance: 15,000

21 November 2002 5	Aboumoslem	0 – 1	Persepolis	Mashhad
	S. Beigi 75'	Stats	K. Bagheri (yellow card) 37'; R. Jabbari (yellow card) 65'; S. Entezari 76'	Stadium: Takhti Stadium; Attendance: 10,000

6 December 2002 6	Esteghlal Ahvaz	0 – 0	Persepolis	Ahvaz
	M. Sadatzadeh (yellow card) 69'	Stats	Y. Golmohammadi (yellow card) 35'; A. Mohammadvand (yellow card) 54'	Stadium: Takhti Stadium; Attendance: 25,000

13 December 2002 7	Persepolis	2 – 0	Fajr Sepasi	Tehran
	B. Rahbarifar (yellow card) 35'; P. Rafat 35'; R. Jabbari (yellow card) 74'; Y. Golmohammadi 79'	Stats	B. Shafiei (yellow card) 20'	Stadium: Takhti Stadium; Attendance: 10,000

19 December 2002 8	Pas	0 – 1	Persepolis	Tehran
	J. Nekounam (yellow card) 45'; H. Sarabadani (red card) 62'; R. Rezaei Kamal (yellow card) 70'	Stats	E. Asadi (yellow card) 14'; P. Rafat 19'; Y. Golmohammadi (yellow card) 25'; S. Entezari (yellow card) 37'	Stadium: Takhti Stadium; Attendance: 9,000

27 December 2002 9	Persepolis	1 – 0	Sanat Naft	Tehran
	P. Rafat 12'; R. Shahroudi (yellow card) 35'; P. Jamshidi (yellow card) 54'; E. Asadi (yellow card) 84'	Stats		Stadium: Takhti Stadium; Attendance: 10,000

2 January 2003 10	Sepahan	2 – 1	Persepolis	Isfahan
	E. Bezik 23'; S. Bayat (yellow card) 49'; A. Talebnasab (yellow card) 49'; M. Navidkia 85'	Stats	A. Peyrovani (yellow card) 26'; H. Khanmohmmadi (yellow card) 37'; A. Ansarian 60'	Stadium: Naghsh-e-Jahan Stadium; Attendance: 40,000

10 January 2003 11	Persepolis	1 – 1	Esteghlal	Tabriz
	H. Estili (yellow card) 55'; A. Mohammadvand (yellow card) 62'; A. Ansarian 70' (pen.); P. Rafat (yellow card) 86'; E. Asadi (yellow card) 90'	Stats	A. Samereh 1'; M. Pashazadeh (yellow card) 19'; A. Akbapour (yellow card) 38'; M. Hasheminasab (yellow card) 49'; A. Nikbakht (yellow card) 82'	Stadium: Yadegar Emam Stadium; Attendance: 60,000; Referee: (Italy) Roberto Rosetti

17 January 2003 12	Malavan	1 – 1	Persepolis	Anzali
	A. Ashourizad (yellow card) 42'; M. Gholamin 69' (yellow card) 79'	Stats	Y. Golmohammadi (yellow card) 41'; A. Mohammadvand 79'	Stadium: Takhti Stadium; Attendance: 12,000

23 January 2003 13	Persepolis	3 – 3	Foolad	Tehran
	A. Ansarian 21' (yellow card) 75'; B. Rahbarifar (yellow card) 35'; Y. Golmohammadi 37'; P. Rafat 53'	Stats	B. Seraj 4', 27'; H. Kaabi 11' (yellow card) 14'; A. Mehdipour (yellow card) 39'; S. Mousavi (yellow card) 65'; O. Ambrose (yellow card) 78'	Stadium: Takhti Stadium; Attendance: 15,000

14 February 2003 14	Persepolis	0 – 0	Bargh Shiraz	Tehran
	Y. Bahonar (yellow card) 45'	Stats	M. Agha Mohammadi (yellow card) 56'	Stadium: Takhti Stadium; Attendance: 20,000

23 February 2003 15	Paykan	1 – 1	Persepolis	Tehran
	A. Modir Roosta 5'; D. Haghdoost (yellow card) 15'; S. Tajdar (yellow card) 38'; M. Vaezi (yellow card) 86'	Stats	S. Entezari (yellow card) 14'; P. Rafat (yellow card) 54'; A. Salmani 60'; M. Tartar (yellow card) 69'	Stadium: Takhti Stadium; Attendance: 8,000

6 April 2003 18	Persepolis	1 – 0	Aboumoslem	Tehran
	S. Entezari 14'; R. Jabbari (yellow card) 32'	Stats	E. Yousefi (yellow card) 36'	Stadium: Takhti Stadium; Attendance: 5,000

11 April 2003 16	Persepolis	2 – 1	Saipa	Tehran
	A. Ansarian 3' (pen.); M. Barzegar 57'; S. Entezari (yellow card) 75'	Stats	H. Jafari (yellow card) 15'; M. Ayoubi (yellow card) 36'; B. Gholampour (yellow card) 59'; M. Momeni 83'	Stadium: Takhti Stadium; Attendance: 15,000

15 April 2003 19	Persepolis	2 – 1	Esteghlal Ahvaz	Tehran
	A. Peyrovani 8' (yellow card) 16'; A. Ansarian (yellow card) 39'; E. Asadi 52'; M. Barzegar (yellow card) 75'	Stats	A. Khalifeh Asl 15'; M. Ahmadi (yellow card) 78'	Stadium: Takhti Stadium; Attendance: 12,000

24 April 2003 20	Fajr Sepasi	0 – 0	Persepolis	Shiraz
	B. Shafiei (yellow card) 35'	Stats	R. Jabbari (yellow card) 62'	Stadium: Hafezieh Stadium; Attendance: 10,000

7 May 2003 21	Persepolis	0 – 0	Pas	Tehran
	A. Ansarian (red card) 27'; P. Jamshidi (yellow card) 54'	Stats	H. Sarabadani (yellow card) 12'; M. Nosrati (yellow card) 36'; A. Borhani (red card) 68'	Stadium: Takhti Stadium; Attendance: 15,000

12 May 2003 22	Sanat Naft	0 – 0	Persepolis	Abadan
		Stats		Stadium: Takhti Stadium; Attendance: 10,000

16 May 2003 17	Zob Ahan	3 – 2	Persepolis	Fooladshahr
	E. Taghipour (yellow card) 15'; F. Bahadorani (yellow card) 35'; R. Sahebi 42', 80' (yellow card) 79'; A. Vaziri 62'; M. Salehinejad (yellow card) 75'	Stats	S. Entezari 31'; R. Jabbari 70'	Stadium: Fooladshahr Stadium; Attendance: 7,000

21 May 2003 23	Persepolis	1 – 1	Sepahan	Tehran
	B. Rahbarifar (yellow card) 65'; A. Ansarian 82'	Stats	S. Karami (yellow card) 16'; H. Farzaneh (yellow card) 48'; N. Farshbaf 62'	Stadium: Takhti Stadium; Attendance: 10,000

13 June 2003 24	Esteghlal	1 – 2	Persepolis	Tehran
	A. Akbapour (yellow card) 36' (goal) 63'; F. Majidi (red card) 44'; M. Fekri (yellow card) 75'; A. Mansourian (yellow card) 80'; A. Samereh (red card) 89'	Stats	Y. Golmohammadi 11' (yellow card) 15'; B. Abolghasempour 50'; A. Peyrovani (yellow card) 62'	Stadium: Azadi Stadium; Attendance: 80,000; Referee: (Slovakia) Vladimir Hrinak

17 June 2003 25	Persepolis	2 – 3	Malavan	Tehran
	H. Estili 31'; A. Peyrovani (yellow card) 39'; F. Karimi (yellow card) 45'; A. Ansarian (yellow card) 65'; P. Rafat 68'	Stats	P. Nouri 4', 62'; E. Sadeghi (yellow card) 23'; J. Shirzad 24'; M. Gholamalizad (yellow card) 43'; A. Ashourizad (yellow card) 61'	Stadium: Takhti Stadium; Attendance: 10,000

22 June 2003 26	Foolad	0 – 2	Persepolis	Ahvaz
	J. Kameli-Mofrad (yellow card) 12'; A. Mehdipour (red card) 24'; H. Kaabi (red card) 84'; A. Badavi (red card) 88'	Stats	P. Rafat (yellow card) 15'; Y. Golmohammadi (yellow card) 28'; P. Jamshidi (yellow card) 69'; A. Mohammadvand 77', 90+4'	Stadium: Takhti Stadium; Attendance: N/A

==== Score overview ====
Win Draw Loss

Opposition	Home score	Away score	Aggregate score
Aboomoslem	1–0	0–1	2–0
Bargh Shiraz	0–0	1–2	2–1
Esteghlal	1–1	1–2	3–2
Esteghlal Ahvaz	2–1	0–0	2–1
Fajr Sepasi	2–0	0–0	2–0
Foolad	3–3	0–2	5–3
Malavan	2–3	1–1	3–4
PAS	0–0	0–1	1–0
Paykan	1–0	1–1	2–1
Saipa	2–1	1–1	3–2
Sepahan	1–1	2–1	2–3
Sanat Naft	1–0	0–0	1–0
Zob Ahan	0–1	3–2	4–2

=== Hazfi Cup ===
Win Draw Loss Postponed

Date Round	Home	Score	Away	Location

10 November 2002 1/16	Machine Sazi	0 – 1	Persepolis	Tabriz
			P. Rafat	Stadium: Takhti Stadium

15 November 2002 1/16	Persepolis	1 – 0	Machine Sazi	Tehran
	A. Peyrovani			Stadium: Takhti Stadium

Machine Sazi 0–2 Persepolis on aggregate.

30 November 2002 1/8	Persepolis	2 – 0	Malavan	Tehran
	R. Jabari; B. Rahbarifar			Stadium: Takhti Stadium

18 February 2002 1/8	Malavan	2 – 0 (a.e.t.) (3–0 p)	Persepolis	Anzali
	M. Hamrang; M. Gholamin			Stadium: Takhti Stadium
	Penalties
	M. Gholamin (penalty scored); A. Jamshidian (penalty scored)		Penalty missed

Malavan 2–2 Persepolis on aggregate. Malavan advanced to next round by penalties (3–0)

=== Group D ===
Pos	Team	Pld	W	D	L	GF	GA	GD	Pts	Qualification
1	(Uzbekistan) Pakhtakor (H)	3	3	0	0	7	0	+7	9	Advance to Knockout stage
2	(Iran) Persepolis	3	2	0	1	5	2	+3	6	
3	(Iraq) Al-Talaba	3	1	0	2	3	4	−1	3	
4	(Turkmenistan) Nisa Asgabat	3	0	0	3	1	10	−9	0	

(H) Hosts

Win Draw Loss Postponed

Date Round	Home	Score	Away	Location

9 March 2003 1	Al Talaba (Iraq)	0 – 1	(Iran) Persepolis	Tashkent, Uzbekistan
			Y. Golmohammadi 62'	Stadium: Pakhtakor Stadium; Attendance: 5,000; Referee: (Japan) Masayoshi Okada

11 March 2003 2	Pakhtakor (Uzbekistan)	1 – 0	(Iran) Persepolis	Tashkent, Uzbekistan
	A. Soliev 22'			Stadium: Pakhtakor Stadium; Attendance: 45,000; Referee: (Japan) Masayoshi Okada

13 March 2003 3	Persepolis (Iran)	4 – 1	(Turkmenistan) Nisa Asgabat	Tashkent, Uzbekistan
	H. Khanmohammadi 14', 76'; Y. Golmohammadi 47'; A. Aslanian 90'		A. Meredov 89' (pen.)	Stadium: Pakhtakor Stadium; Attendance: 2,000; Referee: (United Arab Emirates) Fareed Al Marzouqi

== Scorers ==
No.	Pos	Nat	Name	Pro League	Hazfi Cup	ACL	Total
19	CF	(Iran)	Payan Rafat	5	1	0	6
8	CB	(Iran)	Ali Ansarian	5	0	0	5
28	CB	(Iran)	Yahya Golmohammadi	3	0	2	5
14	AM	(Iran)	Reza Jabbari	3	1	0	4
17	CF	(Iran)	Sohrab Entezari	4	0	0	4
12	DM	(Iran)	Aref Mohammadvand	3	0	0	3
3	RB	(Iran)	Hassan Khanmohammadi	0	0	2	2
5	CB	(Iran)	Afshin Peyrovani	1	1	0	2
11	CF	(Iran)	Amirhossein Aslanian	1	0	1	2
20	CB	(Iran)	Behrouz Rahbarifar	0	1	0	1
6 Players				1	0	0	1
Totals				30	4	5	39

=== Goalkeeping ===
			League			Hazfi			Asian			Total		
No	N	Name	M	GA	CS	M	GA	CS	M	GA	CS	M	GA	CS
1	(Iran)	Davoud Fanaei	19	21	10	2	2	1	2	1	1	23	24	12
30	(Iran)	Farshid Karimi	6	6	2	1	0	1	–	–	–	7	6	3
22	(Iran)	Mohammad Mohammadi	1	3	0	1	0	1	1	1	0	3	4	1
Total			26	30	12	4	2	3	3	2	1	33	34	16
Last updated: 31 August 2020

== See also ==
- 2002–03 Iran Pro League
- 2002–03 Hazfi Cup
- 2002–03 AFC Champions League
