= 2001–02 Persepolis F.C. season =

Persepolis
2001–02 season
- Chairman: Ali Mirzaei
- Manager: Ali Parvin
- Stadium: Azadi Stadium
- Iran Pro League: Winners
- Hazfi Cup: Quarter-finals
- Top goalscorer: League: Sohrab Entezari (9 goals); All: Sohrab Entezari (10 goals)
- Highest home attendance: (9 May 2002 against Esteghlal)
Home colours	Away colours

The 2001–02 season was Persepolis's first season in the Pro League and their 19th consecutive season in the top division of Iranian Football. They also competed in the Hazfi Cup. Persepolis was captained by Afshin Peyrovani.

== Squad ==
Note: Flags indicate national team as defined under FIFA eligibility rules; some limited exceptions apply. Players may hold more than one non-FIFA nationality.

No.	Pos.	Nation	Player
1	GK	IRI	Davoud Fanaei
2	DF	IRI	Mohammad Barzegar
3	DF	IRI	Hassan Khanmohammadi
4	DF	IRI	Younes Bahonar
5	DF	IRI	Afshin Peyrovani (captain)
6	MF	IRI	Ebrahim Asadi
7	MF	IRI	Hamid Estili
8	DF	IRI	Ali Ansarian
9	MF	IRI	Mehdi Tartar
10	MF	IRI	Hamed Kavianpour
11	FW	IRI	Amirhossein Aslanian
12	MF	IRI	Ali Lashkari
14	MF	IRI	Reza Jabbari

No.	Pos.	Nation	Player
15	MF	IRI	Esmaeil Halali
16	FW	IRI	Sohrab Entezari
17	MF	IRI	Pejman Jamshidi
18	FW	IRI	Behnam Abolghasempour
19	FW	IRI	Payan Rafat
20	DF	IRI	Behrouz Rahbarifard (3rd captain)
22	GK	IRI	Mohammadreza Jounakizadeh
23	FW	IRI	Laith Nobari
24	FW	IRI	Ehsan Khorsandi
27	DF	IRI	Reza Shahroudi (Vice captain)
30	GK	IRI	Farshid Karimi
33	GK	IRI	Mohammad Mohammadi

== Technical staff ==
Position	Staff
Head coach	(Iran) Ali Parvin
Assistant coach	(Iran) Nasser Ebrahimi
Physical fitness trainer	(Iran) Parviz Komasi
Goalkeeping coach	(Iran) Vahid Ghelich
Doctor	(Iran) Dr. Farid Zarineh
Team Manager	(Iran) Mahmoud Khordbin

== Competitions ==
=== Overview ===
Competition	Started round	Current position / round	Final position / round	First match	Last match
2001–02 Iran Pro League	—	—	Winners	November 4, 2001	May 28, 2002
2001–02 Hazfi Cup	Round of 32	—	Quarterfinals	December 3, 2001	April 9, 2002

=== Iran Pro League ===
==== Standings ====
Pos	Team	Pld	W	D	L	GF	GA	GD	Pts	Qualification or relegation
1	Persepolis (C)	26	13	10	3	36	23	+13	49	Qualification for the 2002–03 AFC Champions League group stage
2	Esteghlal	26	13	9	4	38	21	+17	48	Qualification for the 2002–03 AFC Champions League qualification
3	Foolad	26	12	9	5	32	23	+9	45	
4	Pas	26	10	13	3	39	24	+15	43	
5	Aboumoslem	26	11	7	8	40	31	+9	40	

Updated to match(es) played on 1 Sep 2018. Source: IPL Stats, Soccerway
Rules for classification: 1) Points; 2) Goal difference; 3) Goals scored.
(C) Champions

==== Matches ====
Win Draw Loss Postponed

4 November 2001 1	Persepolis	1 – 1	Foolad	Tehran
	Jabbari 86'		Seraj 20'	Stadium: Azadi Stadium; Attendance: 7,000; Referee: Saeed Bathaei

19 November 2001 2	Tractor Sazi	0 – 1	Persepolis	Tabriz
			Jabbari 85'	Stadium: Takhti Stadium; Attendance: 15,000; Referee: Farajollah Yasrebi

23 November 2001 3	Sepahan	0 – 0	Persepolis	Isfahan
				Stadium: 22 Bahman; Attendance: 25,000; Referee: Masoud Moradi

27 November 2001 4	Persepolis	3 – 2	Aboomoslem	Tehran
	Entezari 32', 64'; Nobari 80'		Rostami 53'; Razaghirad 90+3'	Stadium: Azadi Stadium; Referee: Jalal Moradi

10 December 2001 5	Paykan	1 – 2	Persepolis	Tehran
	Modir Roosta 32' (pen.)		Abolghasempour 36'; Aslanian 82'	Stadium: Azadi Stadium; Referee: Hosseinali Yazdi

17 December 2001 6	Persepolis	2 – 1	Malavan	Tehran
	Entezari 23' 60'		Pourgholami 90'	Stadium: Azadi Stadium; Attendance: 8,000; Referee: Mohsen Torky

27 December 2001 7	Bargh Shiraz	0 – 0	Persepolis	Shiraz
				Stadium: Hafezieh Stadium; Attendance: 18,000; Referee: Masoud Moradi

3 January 2002 8	Persepolis	1 – 3	PAS	Tehran
	Halali 2'		Khatibi 7', 33'; Nekounam 27'	Stadium: Azadi Stadium; Attendance: 15,000; Referee: Jalal Moradi

18 January 2002 9	Esteghlal	1 – 1	Persepolis	Tehran
	Navazi 38' (pen.)		Jabbari 25'; Ansarian (yellow card) (yellow-red card) 87'	Stadium: Azadi Stadium; Attendance: 100,000; Referee: (Italy) Pasquale Rodomonti

25 January 2002 10	Persepolis	3 – 0	Zob Ahan	Tehran
	Kavianpour 3'; Taghipour 41' (o.g.); Nobari 88'			Stadium: Azadi Stadium; Attendance: 20,000; Referee: Fereydoun Esfahanian

31 January 2002 11	Esteghlal Rasht	1 – 3	Persepolis	Rasht
	Feyzi Moghaddam 35'		Rahbarifar 17'; Jabbari 23', 32'	Stadium: Azodi Stadium; Attendance: 20,000; Referee: Jalal Moradi

15 February 2002 12	Persepolis	1 – 1	Saipa	Tehran
	Ansarian 73' (pen.)		Momeni 68'; H. Kazemi (red card) 75'	Stadium: Azadi Stadium; Attendance: 15,000; Referee: Ali Khosravi

21 February 2002 13	Fajr Sepasi	1 – 0	Persepolis	Shiraz
	Tahmasebi 3'			Stadium: Hafezieh Stadium; Referee: Fereydoun Esfahanian

8 March 2002 14	Foolad	1 – 2	Persepolis	Ahvaz
	Shirmardi 75'		Entezari 47', 89'	Stadium: Takhti Stadium; Attendance: 15,000; Referee: Farajollah Yasrebi

12 March 2002 15	Persepolis	2 – 1	Tractor Sazi	Tehran
	Halali 10'; Entezari 85'		Aliyari 70'	Stadium: Azadi Stadium; Referee: Siamak Bakhshi

17 March 2002 16	Persepolis	3 – 2	Sepahan	Tehran
	Rahbarifar 28' (pen.); Aslanian 80'; Abolghasempour 90+3'		Stepanyan 46'; Hajipour 64'	Stadium: Azadi Stadium; Attendance: 15,000; Referee: Fereydoun Esfahanian

16 April 2002 17	Aboomoslem	1 – 1	Persepolis	Mashhad
	Feyz Karimlou 13'		Peyrovani 45+1'	Stadium: Takhti Stadium; Referee: Ali Khosravi

21 April 2002 18	Persepolis	1 – 0	Paykan	Tehran
	Rahbarifar 64'			Stadium: Azadi Stadium; Referee: Rahim Rahimi Moghadam

26 April 2002 19	Malavan	1 – 1	Persepolis	Anzali
	Nouri 71'		Khanmohammadi 31'	Stadium: Takhti Stadium; Attendance: 15,000; Referee: Saeed Bathaei

30 April 2002 20	Persepolis	0 – 1	Bargh Shiraz	Tehran
	Ansarian (red card) 90'		Sasani 46'	Stadium: Azadi Stadium; Attendance: 10,000; Referee: Jalal Moradi

4 May 2002 21	PAS	0 – 0	Persepolis	Tehran
				Stadium: Azadi Stadium; Attendance: 7,000; Referee: Fereydoun Esfahanian

9 May 2002 22	Persepolis	0 – 0	Esteghlal	Tehran
			Vahedi Nikbakht (red card) 86'	Stadium: Azadi Stadium; Attendance: 100,000; Referee: (Portugal) Paulo Costa

14 May 2002 23	Zob Ahan	1 – 1	Persepolis	Fooladshahr
	Azizzadeh 31'		Entezari 12'	Stadium: Fooladshahr Stadium; Attendance: 12,000; Referee: Farajollah Yasrebi

19 May 2002 24	Persepolis	2 – 1	Esteghlal Rasht	Tehran
	Barzegar 51'; Entezari 73'		Bayat 86' (pen.)	Stadium: Azadi Stadium; Referee: Siamak Bakhshi

23 May 2002 25	Saipa	2 – 4	Persepolis	Tehran
	Kazemian 38'; Soltani 50'		Ansarian 30' (pen.), 73'; Aslanian 32', 81'	Stadium: Azadi Stadium; Attendance: 10,000; Referee: Khodadad Afsharian

28 May 2002 26	Persepolis	1 – 0	Fajr Sepasi	Tehran
	Asadi 62'			Stadium: Azadi Stadium; Attendance: 20,000; Referee: Ali Khosravi

==== Score overview ====
Win Draw Loss

Opposition	Home score	Away score	Aggregate score
Aboomoslem	3–2	1–1	4–3
Bargh Shiraz	0–1	0–0	0–1
Esteghlal	0–0	1–1	1–1
Esteghlal Rasht	2–1	1–3	5–2
Fajr Sepasi	1–0	1–0	1–1
Foolad	1–1	1–2	3–1
Malavan	2–1	1–1	3–2
PAS	1–3	0–0	1–3
Paykan	1–0	1–2	3–1
Saipa	1–1	2–4	5–3
Sepahan	3–2	0–0	3–2
Tractor	2–1	0–1	3–1
Zob Ahan	3–0	1–1	4–1

=== Hazfi Cup ===
Round of 32

3 December 2001	Persepolis	3 – 2	Bargh Tehran	Tehran
	Peyrovani 13'; Entezari 80'; Aslanian 90+5'		Mohtashami 20'; Salmani 31'	Stadium: Azadi Stadium; Attendance: 4,000; Referee: Mehdi Honarvari

Round of 16

10 January 2002 First leg	Persepolis	1 – 1	Aboomoslem	Tehran
	Rahbarifar (red card) 82'; Ansarian 85' (pen.)		Mikaeili 10'	Stadium: Azadi Stadium; Attendance: 5,000; Referee: Ali Khosravi

9 February 2002 Second leg	Aboomoslem	2 – 2 (3 – 3a agg.)	Persepolis	Mashhad
	Rajabi 17'; Badamaki 48'		Jabbari 53'; Ansarian 90'	Stadium: Takhti Stadium; Attendance: 15,000; Referee: Masoud Moradi
Note: Persepolis advanced to next round by away goals rule.

Quarterfinals

8 April 2002	Paykan	1 – 0 (a.e.t.)	Persepolis	Karaj
	Bakhshizadeh (red card) 55'; Salehpour 98'			Stadium: Enghelab Stadium
Note: Paykan won the game by golden goal rule.

== Scorers ==
No.	Pos	Nat	Name	League	Hazfi Cup	Total
16	CF	(Iran)	Sohrab Entezari	9	1	10
14	AM	(Iran)	Reza Jabbari	5	1	6
11	CF	(Iran)	Amirhossein Aslanian	4	1	5
8	CB	(Iran)	Ali Ansarian	3	2	5
20	CB	(Iran)	Behrouz Rahbarifar	3	0	3
23	CF	(Iran)	Laith Nobari	2	0	2
18	CF	(Iran)	Behnam Abolghasempour	2	0	2
15	CM	(Iran)	Esmaeil Halali	2	0	2
5	CB	(Iran)	Afshin Peyrovani	1	1	2
10	CM	(Iran)	Hamed Kavianpour	1	0	1
3	RB	(Iran)	Hassan Khanmohammadi	1	0	1
2	LB	(Iran)	Mohammad Barzegar	1	0	1
21	CM	(Iran)	Ebrahim Asadi	1	0	1
Other				1	0	1
Totals				36	6	42

=== Goalkeeping ===
			League			Hazfi			Total		
No	N	Name	M	GA	CS	M	GA	CS	M	GA	CS
1	(Iran)	Davoud Fanaei	21	19	6	3	5	0	24	24	6
22	(Iran)	Mohammadreza Jounakizadeh	2	1	1	–	–	–	2	1	1
30	(Iran)	Farshid Karimi	3	3	1	1	1	0	4	4	1
Total			26	23	8	4	6	0	30	29	8
Last updated: 31 August 2020
