= 2003–04 Persepolis F.C. season =

Persepolis
2003–04 season
- Chairman: Akbar Ghamkhar
- Manager: Vingo Begovic
- Stadium: Azadi Stadium
- Iran Pro League: 5th
- Hazfi Cup: Round of 16
- Top goalscorer: League: Ali Daei (16 goals); All: Ali Daei (17 goals)
- Highest home attendance: 100,000 (16 October 2003 against Esteghlal)
Home colours	Away colours

The 2003–04 season was Persepolis's 3rd season in the Iran Pro League, and their 21st consecutive season in the top division of Iranian Football. They also competed in the Hazfi Cup. Persepolis was captained by Afshin Peyrovani.

== Squad ==
As of October 2003. Note: Flags indicate national team as defined under FIFA eligibility rules; some limited exceptions apply. Players may hold more than one non-FIFA nationality.

No.	Pos.	Nation	Player
1	GK	MKD	Saša Ilić
2	DF	IRI	Mohammad Barzegar
3	DF	IRI	Hassan Khanmohammadi
4	DF	IRI	Yahya Golmohammadi
5	DF	IRI	Afshin Peyrovani (captain)
6	MF	IRI	Karim Bagheri
8	MF	IRI	Hamed Kavianpour
9	FW	IRI	Javad Kazemian
10	FW	IRI	Ali Daei (vice captain)
11	MF	IRI	Mehrdad Minavand
12	MF	IRI	Aref Mohammadvand
13	FW	MLI	Issa Traore
14	MF	IRI	Reza Jabbari
15	DF	IRI	Mojtaba Shiri
17	FW	IRI	Sohrab Entezari

No.	Pos.	Nation	Player
18	FW	IRI	Meghdad Ghobakhlou
19	DF	IRI	Pejman Jamshidi
20	DF	IRI	Younes Bahonar
21	MF	IRI	Ebrahim Asadi
22	GK	IRI	Mohammad Mohammadi
23	DF	IRI	Alireza Emamifar
24	FW	IRI	Ali Salmani
25	MF	IRI	Hamid Estili (3rd captain)
26	FW	IRI	Mehrdad Oladi
30	GK	IRI	Farshid Karimi
39	DF	IRI	Ali Nikkhou
63	DF	IRI	Sheys Rezaei
76	FW	IRI	Behnam Afsheh

== Transfers ==
=== In ===
No	P	Name	Age	Moving from	Transfer fee	Type	Transfer window	Source
1	GK	(North Macedonia) Saša Ilić	33	(Russia) Dynamo St. Petersburg	–	Free Transfer	Summer	
	LB	Ali Nikkhou	25	Aboumoslem	–	Free Transfer	Summer	
8	CM	Hamed Kavianpour	23	(United Arab Emirates) Al Wasl	–	Free Transfer	Summer	
23	LB	Alireza Emamifar	29	(Belgium) Charleroi	–	Free Transfer	Summer	
9	RW	Javad Kazemian	22	Saipa	–	Free Transfer	Summer	
13	RW	(Mali) Issa Traore	23	(Armenia) Pyunik	–	Free Transfer	Summer	
10	CF	Ali Daei	33	(United Arab Emirates) Al Shabab	–	Free Transfer	Summer	
	CB	Sheys Rezaei	19	Saipa	–	Free Transfer	Summer	
26	SS	Mehrdad Oladi	18	Persepolis Qaemshahr	–	Free Transfer	Summer	
18	CF	Meghdad Ghobakhlou	21	Persepolis Academy	–	Promoted	Summer	
	CF	(Liberia) Christopher Wreh	28	(Scotland) St Mirren	–	Free Transfer	Summer	
	RW	Behnam Afsheh	21	Persepolis Academy	–	Promoted	Winter	

=== Out ===
No	P	Name	Age	Moving to	Transfer fee	Type	Transfer window	Source
1	GK	Davoud Fanaei	27	Azarbayejan	–	Free Transfer	Summer	
20	CB	Behrouz Rahbarifar	32	Pas	–	Free Transfer	Summer	
18	CF	Behnam Abolghasempour	30	Pas	–	Free Transfer	Summer	
19	CF	Payan Rafat	33	Saba Battery	–	Free Transfer	Summer	
16	LB	Reza Shahroudi	31	Pasargad	–	Free Transfer	Summer	
24	CF	Ali Lashgari		Released		Contract termination	Summer	
8	CB	Ali Ansarian	26	Saipa	–	Free Transfer	Summer	
9	DM	Mehdi Tartar	31	Aboumoslem	–	Free Transfer	Summer	
26	RW	Hadi Mahdavikia	24	Released		Contract termination	Summer	
11	SS	Amir Hossein Aslanian	25	Released		Contract termination	Winter	
	CF	(Liberia) Christopher Wreh	28	(England) Bishop's Stortford	–	Free (Contract termination)	Winter	

== Technical staff ==
Position	Staff
Head coach	(Croatia) Vingo Begovic
Assistant coach	(Iran) Fereydoun Moeini
Goalkeeping coach	(Croatia) Fakhroddin Begovićć
Doctor	(Iran) Dr Farid Zarineh
Team Manager	(Iran) Ebrahim Ashtiani

== Competition record ==
Competition	Record							
Competition	G	W	D	L	GF	GA	GD	Win %
Iran Pro League	26	10	9	7	42	28	+14	38.46
Hazfi Cup	4	1	0	3	7	7	+0	25.00
Total	30	11	9	10	49	35	+14	36.67

=== Iran Pro League ===
==== Standings ====
Pos	Team	Pld	W	D	L	GF	GA	GD	Pts	Qualification or relegation
3	Foolad	26	13	8	5	37	22	+15	47	
4	Zob Ahan	26	11	7	8	32	25	+7	40	
5	Persepolis	26	10	9	7	42	28	+14	39	
6	Sepahan	26	11	6	9	47	36	+11	39	Qualification for the 2005 AFC Champions League
7	Paykan	26	8	8	10	24	26	−2	32	

Updated to match(es) played on 01 SEP 2018. Source: IPL Stats, Soccerway
Rules for classification: 1) Points; 2) Goal difference; 3) Goals scored.

== Competitions ==
=== Iran Pro League ===
Win Draw Loss Postponed

Date Round	Home	Score	Away	Location

29 August 2003 1	Persepolis	8 – 2	Pegah	Tehran
	A. Salmani 15'; A. Daei 38', 71' (pen.), 85', 90'; A. Peyrovani 56'; J. Kazemian 61', 78'		F. Kojoeian 18'; P. Nouri 67'; A. Ashourizad (yellow card) 68' (yellow-red card) 69'	Stadium: Azadi Stadium; Attendance: 40,000

8 September 2003 2	Aboumoslem	0 – 1	Persepolis	Mashhad
			R. Jabbari 9'; M. Barzegar (yellow card); S. Ilić (yellow card)	Stadium: Takhti Stadium

13 September 2003 3	Persepolis	5 – 2	Fajr Sepasi	Tehran
	R. Jabbari 31'; A. Daei 66', 69'; J. Kazemian 82'; K. Bagheri 90'		M. Madanchi 27'; S. Shirmardi 87'	Stadium: Azadi Stadium; Attendance: 15,000

18 September 2003 4	Paykan	2 – 1	Persepolis	Tehran
	M. Ebrahimian 41'; B. Tahmasebi 45'		K. Bagheri 62' (pen.)	Stadium: Azadi Stadium; Attendance: 45,000

30 September 2003 5	Persepolis	3 – 3	Sepahan	Tehran
	R. Jabbari 23'; A. Salmani 52'; I. Traore 73'; Y. Bahonar (red card)		A. Talebnasab 37'; E. Bezik 40' (pen.), 48'	Stadium: Azadi Stadium

6 October 2003 6	Esteghlal Ahvaz	1 – 1	Persepolis	Ahvaz
	D. Haghi 33'		J. Kazemian 70'	Stadium: Takhti Stadium; Referee: Masoud Moradi

16 October 2003 7	Persepolis	1 – 2	Esteghlal	Tehran
	I. Traore 70'		A. Samereh 9'; M. Navazi (yellow card) 43'; M. Fekri 56'	Stadium: Azadi Stadium; Attendance: 100,000; Referee: (Portugal) Manuel Costa

23 October 2003 8	Pas	2 – 1	Persepolis	Tehran
	J. Nekounam (red card) 65'; A. Aghaei 80'; B. Rahbarifar 85' (pen.); B. Abolghasempour (yellow card); F. Rabikhah (yellow card); A. Janmaleki (yellow card); A. Borhani (yellow card)		A. Mohammadvand (red card) 65'; A. Daei 90+2' (pen.); R. Jabbari (yellow card); S. Ilić (yellow card)	Stadium: Azadi Stadium; Attendance: 40,000

7 November 2003 9	Persepolis	4 – 0	Bargh Shiraz	Tehran
	S. Entezari 17', 75'; A. Daei 61', 67'			Stadium: Azadi Stadium

23 November 2003 10	Shamoushak	0 – 1	Persepolis	Noshahr
			A. Daei 67'

30 November 2003 11	Persepolis	2 – 0	Saipa	Tehran
	S. Entezari 15'; A. Daei 39'			Stadium: Azadi Stadium

7 December 2003 12	Zob Ahan	1 – 0	Persepolis	Fooladshahr
	E. Taghipour 29'; J. Omidian (yellow card); M. Rajabzadeh (yellow card)			Stadium: Fooladshahr Stadium

11 December 2003 13	Persepolis	1 – 0	Foolad	Tehran
	A. Daei 67'			Stadium: Azadi Stadium; Attendance: 15,000

18 December 2003 14	Pegah	0 – 0	Persepolis	Rasht
				Stadium: Dr. Azodi Stadium

26 December 2003 15	Persepolis	0 – 0	Aboumoslem	Tehran
				Stadium: Azadi Stadium

6 January 2004 16	Fajr Sepasi	1 – 1	Persepolis	Shiraz
	V. Moradi 46'		A. Salmani 18'	Stadium: Hafezieh Stadium

12 January 2004 17	Persepolis	0 – 0	Paykan	Tehran
				Stadium: Azadi Stadium

16 January 2004 18	Sepahan	1 – 2	Persepolis	Isfahan
	M. Karimi 46'		A. Peyrovani 54'; P. Jamshidi 89'	Stadium: Naghsh-e-Jahan Stadium; Attendance: 25,000; Referee: Ali Khosravi

22 January 2004 19	Persepolis	0 – 0	Esteghlal Ahvaz	Tehran
				Stadium: Azadi Stadium

2 February 2004 20	Esteghlal	1 – 1	Persepolis	Tehran
	D. Seyed Abbasi 3'; A. Nikbakht (yellow card)		H. Kavianpour 19' (yellow card); Y. Bahonar (yellow card); P. Jamshidi (yellow card); H. Khanmohammadi (yellow card)	Stadium: Azadi Stadium; Attendance: 100,000; Referee: (Turkey) Mustafa Çulcu

26 February 2004 21	Persepolis	3 – 4	Pas	Tehran
	H. Shakouri 45' (o.g.); I. Traore 82'; A. Daei 84'		J. Nekounam 3', 67'; A. Borhani 59'; Kh. Azizi 87'	Stadium: Azadi Stadium

9 March 2004 22	Bargh Shiraz	0 – 0	Persepolis	Shiraz
				Stadium: Hafezieh Stadium

4 April 2004 23	Persepolis	2 – 1	Shamoushak	Tehran
	A. Daei 27' (pen.), 87'		A. Shokati 29'	Stadium: Azadi Stadium

9 April 2004 24	Saipa	3 – 2	Persepolis	Tehran
	E. Sadeghi 21', 34'; 83'		A. Daei 36' (red card) 83'; K. Bagheri 87' (pen.)	Stadium: Azadi Stadium; Referee: Jalal Moradi

23 April 2004 25	Persepolis	2 – 1	Zob Ahan	Tehran
	K. Bagheri (penalty missed) 22'; H. Khanmohammadi 45+3'; S. Entezari 62'		M. Rajabzadeh 16' (pen.) (yellow card); A. Petrosian (red card) 21'; F. Bahadorani (yellow card); B. Tahmasebi (yellow card)	Stadium: Azadi Stadium; Attendance: 2,000; Referee: Rahim Rahimi Moghadam

3 May 2004 26	Foolad	1 – 0	Persepolis	Ahvaz
	A. Mousavi 65'			Stadium: Takhti Stadium

==== Score overview ====
Win Draw Loss

Opposition	Home score	Away score	Aggregate score
Aboomoslem	0–0	0–1	1–0
Bargh Shiraz	4–0	0–0	4–0
Esteghlal	1–2	1–1	2–3
Esteghlal Ahvaz	0–0	1–1	1–1
Fajr Sepasi	5–2	1–1	6–3
Foolad	1–0	1–0	1–1
PAS	3–4	2–1	4–6
Paykan	0–0	1–2	1–2
Pegah	8–2	0–0	8–2
Saipa	2–0	3–2	4–3
Sepahan	3–3	1–2	5–4
Shamoushak	2–1	0–1	3–1
Zob Ahan	2–1	1–0	2–2

=== Hazfi Cup ===
Win Draw Loss Postponed

Date Round	Home	Score	Away	Location

18 April 2004 Round of 32	Persepolis	3 – 0	Payam	Tehran
	A. Daei 2'; Y. Golmohammadi 15' (red card); A. Salmani 70'			Stadium: Azadi Stadium

12 May 2004 Round of 32	Payam	3 – 2	Persepolis	Mashhad
	R. Bigdeli; H. Bargizar		J. Kazemian; S. Entezari	Stadium: Takhti Stadium

Persepolis 5–3 Payam on aggregate.

25 May 2004 Round of 16	Persepolis	0 – 1	Esteghlal Ahvaz	Tehran
	M. Minavand (red card) 81'		M. Ahmadi 41' (red card) 81'	Stadium: Azadi Stadium; Attendance: 5,000; Referee: Rahim Rahimi Moghadam

11 June 2004 Round of 16	Esteghlal Ahvaz	3 – 2	Persepolis	Ahvaz
	A. Khalife Asl; M. Shiri		J. Kazemian; M. Ghobakhlou	Stadium: Takhti Stadium

Esteghlal Ahvaz 4–2 Persepolis on aggregate.

== Scorers ==
No.	Pos	Nat	Name	Pro League	Hazfi Cup	Total
10	CF	(Iran)	Ali Daei	16	1	17
9	RW	(Iran)	Javad Kazemian	4	2	6
17	CF	(Iran)	Sohrab Entezari	4	1	5
24	RW	(Iran)	Ali Salmani	3	1	4
6	DM	(Iran)	Karim Bagheri	3	0	3
13	CF	(Mali)	Issa Traore	3	0	3
14	AM	(Iran)	Reza Jabbari	3	0	3
5	CB	(Iran)	Afshin Peyrovani	2	0	2
3	RB	(Iran)	Hassan Khanmohammadi	1	0	1
4	CB	(Iran)	Yahya Golmohammadi	0	1	1
8	CM	(Iran)	Hamed Kavianpour	1	0	1
19	RB	(Iran)	Pejman Jamshidi	1	0	1
18	CF	(Iran)	Meghdad Ghobakhlou	0	1	1
Own goals				1	0	1
Totals				42	7	49

- Top scorer of competition

=== Goalkeeping ===
			League			Hazfi			Total		
No	N	Name	M	GA	CS	M	GA	CS	M	GA	CS
1	(North Macedonia)	Saša Ilić	25	27	10	2	4	0	27	31	10
22	(Iran)	Mohammad Mohammadi	1	1	0	2	3	1	3	4	1
Total			26	28	10	4	7	1	30	35	11
Last updated: 31 August 2020

== See also ==
- 2003–04 Iran Pro League
- 2003–04 Hazfi Cup
