= 2000–01 Persepolis F.C. season =

Persepolis
2000–01 season
- Chairman: Amir Abedini
- Manager: Ali Parvin
- Stadium: Azadi Stadium
- Azadegan League: 2nd
- Hazfi Cup: Round of 16
- Asian Club Championship: 3rd
- Top goalscorer: League: Behrouz Rahbarifar (7 goals); All: Ali Karimi (9 goals)
- Highest home attendance: 110,000 (against Esteghlal)
Home colours	Away colours

The 2000–01 season was the Persepolis's 10th season in the Azadegan League, and their 18th consecutive season in the top division of Iranian Football. They were also competing in the Hazfi Cup and Asian Club Championship. Persepolis was captained by Ahmad Reza Abedzadeh.

== Squad ==
Note: Flags indicate national team as defined under FIFA eligibility rules; some limited exceptions apply. Players may hold more than one non-FIFA nationality.

No.	Pos.	Nation	Player
1	GK	IRI	Ahmad Reza Abedzadeh (captain)
2	DF	IRI	Younes Bahonar
3	DF	IRI	Hassan Khanmohammadi
4	DF	IRI	Ali Ansarian
5	DF	IRI	Afshin Peyrovani (vice captain)
6	DF	IRI	Ebrahim Taghipour
7	MF	IRI	Hamid Estili
8	MF	IRI	Ali Karimi
10	FW	IRI	Edmond Bezik
11	MF	IRI	Hamed Kavianpour
12	MF	IRI	Ali Lashkari
14	MF	IRI	Reza Jabbari
15	MF	IRI	Esmaeil Halali
16	DF	IRI	Reza Shahroudi (3rd captain)

No.	Pos.	Nation	Player
17	MF	IRI	Hadi Mahdavikia
18	DF	IRI	Mohammad Barzegar
19	FW	IRI	Payan Rafat
20	DF	IRI	Behrouz Rahbarifard
21	MF	IRI	Ali Akbarian
22	GK	IRI	Davoud Fanaei
23	FW	IRI	Laith Nobari
24	MF	IRI	Mehdi Tartar
25	MF	IRI	Ebrahim Asadi
26	FW	IRI	Amirhossein Aslanian
30	GK	IRI	Farshid Karimi
33	DF	IRI	Hadi Aghily
—	MF	IRI	Mojtaba Faraji

== Mid-season Transfers ==
=== Out ===
No	P	Name	Age	Moving to	Transfer fee	Type	Source
9	CF	Behnam Seraj	29	Foolad		Transfer	
23	RM	Alireza Emamifar	26	Fajr Sepasi		Transfer	
6	CB	Ebrahim Taghipour	23	Zob Ahan		Transfer	

== Technical staff ==
Position	Staff
Head coach	(Iran) Ali Parvin
Assistant coach	(Iran) Nasser Ebrahimi
Physical fitness trainer	(Iran) Parviz Komasi
Goalkeeping coach	(Iran) Vahid Ghelich
Doctor	(Iran) Dr. Farid Zarineh
Team Manager	(Iran) Mahmoud Khordbin

== Competitions ==
=== Overview ===
Competition	Started round	Current position / round	Final position / round	First match	Last match
2000–01 Azadegan League	—	—	Runners-up	August 4, 2000	April 19, 2001
2000–01 Hazfi Cup	Round of 16	—	Round of 16	May 1, 2001	May 1, 2001
2000–01 Asian Club Championship	—	—	Third-place	September 7, 2000	May 26, 2001

=== Azadegan League ===
==== Standings ====
Pos	Team	Pld	W	D	L	GF	GA	GD	Pts	Qualification
1	Esteghlal (C)	22	15	5	2	52	21	+31	50	Qualification for the 2001–02 Asian Club Championship
2	Persepolis	22	13	7	2	36	16	+20	46	
3	Saipa	22	8	9	5	29	27	+2	33	
4	Zob Ahan	22	7	9	6	30	22	+8	30	
5	Paykan	22	7	7	8	19	29	−10	28	

Updated to match(es) played on 1 September 2018. Source: RSSSF
Rules for classification: 1) Points; 2) Goal difference; 3) Goals scored.
(C) Champions

==== Matches ====
Win Draw Loss Postponed

4 August 2000 1	Saipa	2 – 2	Persepolis	Tehran
	Momeni 44'; Abolghasempour 50'		Kavianpour 55'; Jabbari 77'	Stadium: Azadi Stadium

11 August 2000 2	Persepolis	2 – 0	Paykan	Tehran
	Jabbari 65'; Halali 80'			Stadium: Azadi Stadium

18 August 2000 3	Foolad	0 – 1	Persepolis	Ahvaz
			Rahbarifar 30' (pen.)	Stadium: Takhti Stadium

12 September 2000 4	Persepolis	0 – 0	Fajr Sepasi	Tehran
				Stadium: Azadi Stadium

16 September 2000 5	Zob Ahan	1 – 2	Persepolis	Isfahan
	Ostovari 50'		Rafat 2' 58'	Stadium: 22 Bahman

9 November 2000 6	Persepolis	2 – 1	Pas	Tehran
	Bezik 44'; Khanmohammadi 80'		Shahbazian 55' (pen.)	Stadium: Azadi Stadium

3 December 2000 8	Persepolis	1 – 0	Tractor	Tehran
	Estili 45'			Stadium: Azadi Stadium; Attendance: 20,000

8 December 2000 9	Esteghlal Rasht	1 – 4	Persepolis	Rasht
	Bani Ahmad 47'		Karimi 21'; Rahbarifar 30' 35' (pen.); Estili 83' (pen.)	Stadium: Shahid Dr. Azodi Stadium; Attendance: 30,000

14 December 2000 10	Persepolis	1 – 0	Bargh Shiraz	Tehran
	Rahbarifar 90' (pen.)			Stadium: Azadi Stadium

23 December 2000 11	Sepahan	0 – 0	Persepolis	Isfahan
				Stadium: 22 Bahman

29 December 2000 7	Esteghlal	2 – 2	Persepolis	Tehran
	Navazi 67'; Hasheminasab 83'; Boroumand (red card) 90'		Rahbarifar 58' (pen.); Karimi 88'	Stadium: Azadi Stadium; Attendance: 110,000

5 January 2001 12	Persepolis	2 – 2	Saipa	Tehran
	Khanmohammadi 34'; Karimi 80'		Jamshidi 17'; Soltani 87'	Stadium: Azadi Stadium

22 January 2001 14	Persepolis	2 – 1	Foolad	Tehran
	Aslanian 7'; Kavianpour 20'		Mobali 35'	Stadium: Azadi Stadium; Attendance: 10,000

28 January 2001 15	Fajr Sepasi	1 – 1	Persepolis	Shiraz
	Fatemi 43' (pen.)		Rafat 18'	Stadium: Hafezieh Stadium; Attendance: 25,000

2 February 2001 16	Persepolis	2 – 0	Zob Ahan	Tehran
	Peyrovani 35'; Ansarian 90' (pen.)			Stadium: Azadi Stadium; Attendance: 25,000

16 February 2001 13	Paykan	1 – 3	Persepolis	Tehran
	Salek Jabbari 73'		Jabbari 10'; Bezik 20'; Barzegar 23'	Stadium: Azadi Stadium; Attendance: 30,000

12 February 2001 17	Pas	0 – 0	Persepolis	Tehran
				Stadium: Azadi Stadium; Attendance: 20,000

23 February 2001 18	Persepolis	0 – 1	Esteghlal	Tehran
			Akbarpour 74'	Stadium: Azadi Stadium; Attendance: 100,000

28 February 2001 19	Tractor	0 – 3	Persepolis	Tabriz
			Karimi 5'; Rafat 46'; Asadi 79'	Stadium: Takhti Stadium; Attendance: 20,000

17 March 2001 20	Persepolis	4 – 1	Esteghlal Rasht	Tehran
	Nobari 6'; Rahbarifar 32' 43' (pen.); Aslanian 78'		Bani Ahmad 85'	Stadium: Azadi Stadium; Attendance: 20,000

13 April 2001 21	Bargh Shiraz	0 – 2	Persepolis	Shiraz
			Karimi 67'; Nobari 90+1'	Stadium: Hafezieh Stadium; Attendance: 30,000

19 April 2001 22	Persepolis	0 – 2	Sepahan	Tabriz
			Mousavi 67' 86'	Stadium: Takhti Stadium; Attendance: 25,000

==== Score overview ====
Win Draw Loss

Opposition	Home score	Away score	Aggregate score
Bargh Shiraz	1–0	0–2	3–0
Esteghlal	0–1	2–2	2–3
Esteghlal Rasht	4–1	1–4	8–2
Fajr Sepasi	0–0	1–1	1–1
Foolad	2–1	0–1	3–1
PAS	2–1	0–0	2–1
Paykan	2–0	1–3	5–1
Saipa	2–2	2–2	4–4
Sepahan	0–2	0–0	0–2
Tractor	1–0	0–3	4–0
Zob Ahan	2–0	1–2	4–1

=== Hazfi Cup ===
Round of 16

1 May 2001 First leg	Persepolis	1 – 0	Shamoushak Noshahr	Tehran
10:00 DST +04:30	Halali 15'			Stadium: Shahid Shiroudi Stadium

6 May 2001 Second leg	Shamoushak Noshahr	3 – 0 (3 – 1 agg.)	Persepolis	Sari
	Entezari			Stadium: Shahid Motaghi Stadium; Attendance: 20,000
Note: The match was half over due to the collapse of the stadium roof while it was 2-0 in favor of Shamoushak. Many spectators died and many were severely injured. Eventually the match declared 3-0 in favor of Shamoushak.

=== Asian Club Championship ===
==== First round ====
24 August 2000 First leg	Al-Wakrah (Qatar)	2 – 4	(Iran) Persepolis	Doha, Qatar
			Karimi; Akbarian 79'; Estili

7 September 2000 Second leg	Persepolis (Iran)	5 – 1 (9 – 3 agg.)	(Qatar) Al-Wakrah	Tehran, Iran
	Rafat 11'; Emamifar 13'; Rahbarifar; Karimi; Seraj		Alkawari (pen.)	Stadium: Azadi Stadium

==== Second round ====
2 November 2000 First leg	Persepolis (Iran)	2 – 0	(United Arab Emirates) Al Ain	Tehran, Iran
	Rafat			Stadium: Azadi Stadium

16 November 2000 Second leg	Al Ain (United Arab Emirates)	2 – 2 (a.e.t.) (2 – 4 agg.)	(Iran) Persepolis	Al Ain, United Arab Emirates
			Peyrovani; Khanmohammadi	Stadium: Tahnoun bin Mohammed Stadium

==== Quarterfinals ====
===== West Asia =====
Team	Pld	W	D	L	GF	GA	GD	Pts
(Iran) Persepolis	3	1	2	0	3	1	+2	5
(Kazakhstan) FC Irtysh	3	1	2	0	2	1	+1	5
(Saudi Arabia) Al-Ittihad Jeddah	3	1	1	1	3	2	+1	4
(Saudi Arabia) Al-Hilal	3	0	1	2	1	5	−4	1

7 March 2001 1	Persepolis (Iran)	0 – 0	(Saudi Arabia) Al-Ittihad Jeddah	Tehran, Iran
				Stadium: Azadi Stadium

9 March 2001 2	Persepolis (Iran)	0 – 0	(Kazakhstan) FC Irtysh	Tehran, Iran
				Stadium: Azadi Stadium

11 March 2001 3	Persepolis (Iran)	3 – 1	(Saudi Arabia) Al-Hilal	Tehran, Iran
	Karimi 45'; Ansarian 65' (pen.); Kavianpour 69'		Al-Thunayan 9' Al-Dosari (yellow card) (yellow-red card) 63' Pérez (yellow card) (yellow-red card) 78'	Stadium: Azadi Stadium

==== Semifinals ====
24 May 2001	Persepolis (Iran)	1 – 2	(South Korea) Suwon Samsung Bluewings	Suwon, South Korea
	Kavianpour 12'		Seo Jung-Won 78'; Park Kun-Ha 90'

==== Third place match ====
26 May 2001	Persepolis (Iran)	2 – 0	(Kazakhstan) FC Irtysh	Suwon, South Korea
	Halali 17'; Estili 34'

== Scorers ==
No.	Pos	Nat	Name	League	Hazfi Cup	Asian	Total
8	AM	(Iran)	Ali Karimi	5	0	4	9
20	CB	(Iran)	Behrouz Rahbarifar	7	0	1	8
19	CF	(Iran)	Payan Rafat	4	0	3	7
11	CM	(Iran)	Hamed Kavianpour	2	0	2	4
7	CM	(Iran)	Hamid Estili	2	0	2	4
3	RB	(Iran)	Hassan Khanmohammadi	2	0	1	3
14	AM	(Iran)	Reza Jabbari	3	0	0	3
15	CM	(Iran)	Esmaeil Halali	1	1	1	3
5	CB	(Iran)	Afshin Peyrovani	1	0	1	2
23	CF	(Iran)	Laith Nobari	2	0	0	2
26	CF	(Iran)	Amirhossein Aslanian	2	0	0	2
10	CF	(Iran)	Edmond Bezik	2	0	0	2
4	CB	(Iran)	Ali Ansarian	1	0	1	2
18	LB	(Iran)	Mohammad Barzegar	1	0	0	1
25	CM	(Iran)	Ebrahim Asadi	1	0	0	1
21	AM	(Iran)	Ali Akbarian	0	0	1	1
23	RM	(Iran)	Alireza Emamifar	0	0	1	1
9	CF	(Iran)	Behnam Seraj	0	0	1	1
Totals				36	1	19	56

=== Goalkeeping ===
			League			Hazfi			Asian			Total		
No	N	Name	M	GA	CS	M	GA	CS	M	GA	CS	M	GA	CS
22	(Iran)	Davoud Fanaei	10	7	4	2	2	1	6	6	3	18	15	8
1	(Iran)	Ahmad Reza Abedzadeh	12	9	6	–	–	–	3	2	1	15	11	7
Total			22	16	10	2	2	1	9	8	4	33	26	15
Last updated: 31 August 2020
