= Ali Akbarian =

Iranian association football player

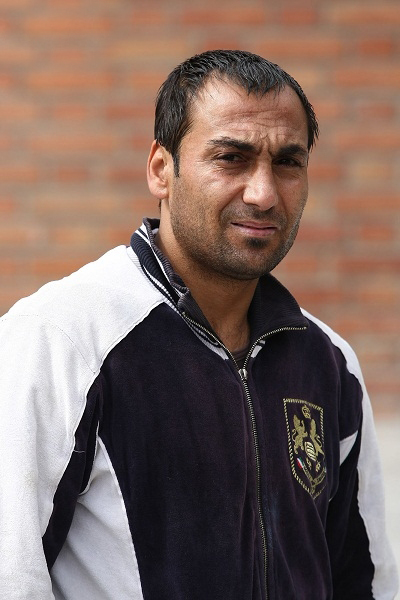

Personal information
- Full name: Ali Akbarian
- Date of birth: 5 January 1972 (age 54)
- Place of birth: Tehran, Iran
- Height: 1.74 m (5 ft 9 in)
- Position: Forward

Senior career*
Years	Team	Apps	(Gls)
- Pars Khodro
1994–1997	Esteghlal F.C.	78	(26)
2000–2001	Persepolis F.C.	34	

International career
1996	Iran		
- * Club domestic league appearances and goals

Ali Akbarian (born 5 January 1972 in Tehran) is an Iranian former football player who has played for Esteghlal, Pars Khodro and Persepolis teams as a striker.

He has appeared in matches 78 times with Esteghlal and 34 times with Persepolis.
