= Issa Traoré =

Malian footballer

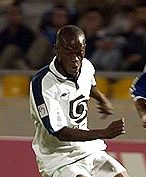

Personal information
- Date of birth: September 9, 1979 (age 47)
- Place of birth: Bamako, Mali
- Height: 1.79 m (5 ft 10 in)
- Positions: Midfielder; striker

Senior career*
Years	Team	Apps	(Gls)
2001–2002	Djoliba AC		
2002–2003	FC Pyunik	24	(8)
2003–2004	Persepolis	19	(3)
2004–2006	Pas	49	(5)
2006–2007	JS Kabylie	15	(1)
2007–2009	Saipa	43	(12)
2009–2010	Rah Ahan	26	(3)
2010–2011	Sanat Naft	12	(0)
2011–2012	Bargh Shiraz	18	(0)

International career
2001–2007	Mali	14	(4)
- * Club domestic league appearances and goals

Issa Traoré (born September 9, 1979 in Bamako) is a retired Malian footballer who played for Persepolis and Pas. Whilst at Pas, Traore endured a major injury on his right knee, and was out for a considerable number of games during his career at the club. After having a couple of unsuccessful seasons in the Iran Pro League he moved to the Algerian League and joined JS Kabylie.
