= Javad Kazemian =

Iranian footballer

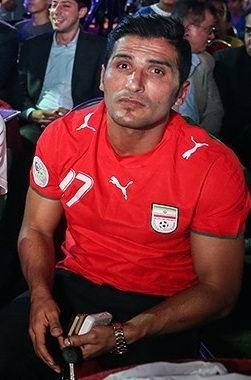
- Kazemian in 2014

Personal information
- Full name: Javad Kazemian
- Date of birth: 23 April 1981 (age 45)
- Place of birth: Kashan, Iran
- Height: 1.74 m (5 ft 8 1/2 in)
- Position: Right winger

Youth career
- 1995–1998: Bank Melli
- 1999–2000: Saipa

Senior career*
Years	Team	Apps	(Gls)
1999–2002	Saipa	41	(13)
2002–2003	Al-Ahli	16	(10)
2003	Saipa	12	(3)
2003–2006	Persepolis	77	(24)
2006–2007	Al-Shaab	20	(11)
2007–2008	Al-Shabab	15	(9)
2008–2010	Ajman	25	(8)
2010	Emirates	7	(4)
2010–2011	Sepahan	21	(2)
2011–2013	Persepolis	39	(6)
2013–2014	Tractor	48	(6)
2014–2015	Saba Qom	7	(1)
Total		328	(97)

International career^{‡}
1999–2001	Iran U20	13	(2)
2001–2003	Iran U23	12	(3)
2001–2012	Iran	40	(3)
- * Club domestic league appearances and goals as of 15 May 2015 ‡ National team caps and goals as of 15 November 2011

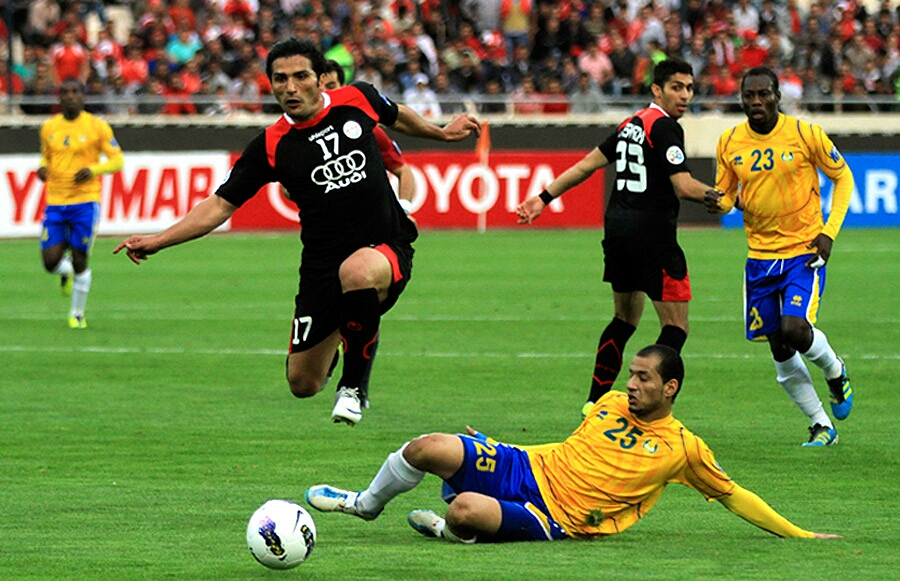
Javad Kazemian in 2012

Javad Kazemian (Persian: جواد كاظميان; born 23 April 1981 in Kashan, Iran) is an Iranian former football winger. He is commonly mistaken for a striker as he is frequently involved in running towards the opposing box, but his preferred position is a right winger.

== Club career ==
He started with the youth team of Saipa and was able to make it to the senior team. There he showed some great performances and was called up to the Iranian national team when Miroslav Blažević was Iran's manager. He joined Al-Ahli of UAE in 2002 with $300'000 deal, playing alongside Ali Karimi. but returned to Iran after a few months, briefly playing for Saipa again, and then three seasons with Persepolis FC.

After World Cup 2006, he signed a one-year loan deal with Emirati club Al-Shaab with the option to sign a permanent contract with the club after a year, but then signed a season-long contract with Al-Shabab club in the end of the league in 2007–2008 season.

In 2008, he went on loan to Ajman football club, following a series of poor performances with Al-Shabab. He had another average season with 17 matches and scoring just 6 goals for the club. He parted ways with Ajman in 2010, following two poor seasons with the club. In 2010, he signed with Dubai club Emirates, avoiding a return to Iran.

He finally returned to Iran in 2010 and signed for Sepahan and won the league.

On 23 July 2011, despite rumors circulating that he has joined Foolad, he signed a contract with Persepolis and joined his beloved club. He extended his contract with Persepolis for one year, keeping him with the team through 2013, but his contract was terminated on 18 December 2012. At the end of the year, he joined Tractor where he made a good partnership with Mehdi Seyed Salehi and finished second in the league.

=== Club career statistics ===
As of 15 May 2015

Club performance			League		Cup		Continental		Total	
Season	Club	League	Apps	Goals	Apps	Goals	Apps	Goals	Apps	Goals
Iran			League		Hazfi Cup		Asia		Total	
1999–00	Saipa	Azadegan League	9	4			–			
2000–01	Saipa	Azadegan League	13	2			–			
2001–02	Saipa	Pro League	19	7			–			
United Arab Emirates			League		President's Cup		Asia		Total	
2002–03	Al Ahli	UAE League	16	10	2	2	2	0	20	12
Iran			League		Hazfi Cup		Asia		Total	
2002–03	Saipa	Pro League	12	3			–			
2003–04	Persepolis	Pro League	24	4	2	1	–		26	5
2004–05	Persepolis	Pro League	25	9	1	0	–		26	9
2005–06	Persepolis	Pro League	28	11	3	0	–		31	11
United Arab Emirates			League		President's Cup		Asia		Total	
2006–07	Al Shaab	UAE League	20	11			–			
2007–08	Al Shabab	UAE League	15	9			–			
2008–09	Ajman	UAE League	17	8			–			
2009–10	Ajman	UAE League	8	0	0	0	–		8	0
2009–10	Emirates	UAE League	7	4	3	1	–		10	5
Iran			League		Hazfi Cup		Asia		Total	
2010–11	Sepahan	Pro League	21	2	2	0	4	2	27	4
2011–12	Persepolis	Pro League	26	5	2	0	5	1	33	6
2012–13	Persepolis	Pro League	13	1	0	0	–		13	1
2012–13	Tractor	Pro League	15	5	0	0	6	1	21	6
2013–14	Tractor	Pro League	23	1	4	0	4	0	31	1
2014–15	Saba Qom	Pro League	7	1	0	0	–		7	1
Total	Iran		235	55			19	4		
Total	United Arab Emirates		83	42			2	0		
Career total			318	97			21	4		

- Assist Goals

Season	Team	Assists
05–06	Persepolis	4
10–11	Sepahan	1
11–12	Persepolis	4
12–13	Persepolis	1
12–13	Tractor	1

== International career ==
Having made his first appearance for the senior national team in January 2001 against China, Javad Kazemian was among the Iranian squad at the 2001 FIFA World Youth Championship in Argentina. He is known primarily for his goal against Japan in the final of the football tournament in the 2002 Asian Games in Busan, South Korea, winning a Gold medal with the Iran U-23 team. He was also a member of the World Cup 2006 squad that went to Germany, but he did not get a chance to play.

Having joined the national team once again in July 2007, he scored Iran's winning goal in its 2007 Asian Cup opening match against Uzbekistan. He has been called up for 2010 FIFA World Cup Qualifying but like before he could not get the first eleven starting.

In 2009, he was called up to the national side after a one-year absence to play an international friendly against China. He participated in the first round of group stages of 2014 FIFA World Cup qualification for Team Melli.

=== International goals ===
Scores and results list Iran's goal tally first.

#	Date	Venue	Opponent	Score	Result	Competition
1	2003-08-15	Azadi Stadium, Tehran	Cameroon	4–0	4–1	Friendly
2	2007-07-11	Bukit Jalil Stadium, Kuala Lumpur	Uzbekistan	2–1	2–1	2007 AFC Asian Cup
3	2011-10-05	Azadi Stadium, Tehran	Palestine	4–0	7–0	Friendly
4	2011-10-05	Azadi Stadium, Tehran	Palestine	7–0	7–0	Friendly

== Personal life ==
After scoring goals for his club, Kazemian sometimes pulls up his shirt to show a photo printed on the shirt underneath, which is of his brother who died in 2004.

On 29 December 2025, Yazdani publicly supported the 2025–2026 Iranian protests by reposting a picture of a protester's resistance to physical force from the Police Command of the Islamic Republic of Iran and stating: "And suffering gives such courage that it is unparalleled. This courage is not sweet, but it will not be bitter either, because it will change the course." On 31 January 2026, Yazdani paid tribute to former footballer Mojtaba Tarshiz, and world classical physics champion Mehdi Zatparvar, who were killed in the protests by posting their pictures with the caption: "What a beautiful death you had".

== Honours ==
=== Club ===
Al-Ahli

- UAE President's Cup: 2001–02

Al-Shabab

- UAE Pro League: 2007–08

Emirates

- UAE President Cup: 2009–10
- UAE Super Cup: 2010

Sepahan

- Iran Pro League: 2010–11

Tractor

- Iran Pro League: 2012–13 (Runner-up)
- Hazfi Cup: 2013–14

=== Country ===
Iran U-23

- Asian Games Gold Medal: 2002
