= Laith Nobari =

Iranian footballer (born 1977)

Personal information
- Full name: Laith Nasseri
- Date of birth: September 23, 1977 (age 49)
- Place of birth: Baghdad, Iraq
- Position: Forward

Youth career
- Bank Melli

Senior career*
Years	Team	Apps	(Gls)
- Bank Melli
1999–2000	Pas		(2)
2000–2002	Persepolis	15	(4)
2002–2003	Saham Club		

International career
1999–2000	Iran	3	(0)

Managerial career
- 2015–2018: KIA Academy
- 2018–: Persepolis U20
- * Club domestic league appearances and goals

Laith Nobari (Persian: لیث نوبری) or Laith Naseri (Persian: لیث ناصری, born 23 September 1977 in Baghdad, Iraq) is an Iraq-born Moaved Iranian retired football player who has played for Persepolis and has represented Iran national football team.

== Club career ==
=== Club career statistics ===
Club performance			League		Cup		Continental		Total	
Season	Club	League	Apps	Goals	Apps	Goals	Apps	Goals	Apps	Goals
Iran			League		Hazfi Cup		Asia		Total	
2000–01	Persepolis	Azadegan League	4	2	2	0	1	0	7	2
2001–02	Persepolis	Iran Pro League	11	2	2	0	–		13	2
Career total			15	4	4	0	1	0	20	4
