= Hamed Kavianpour =

Iranian footballer

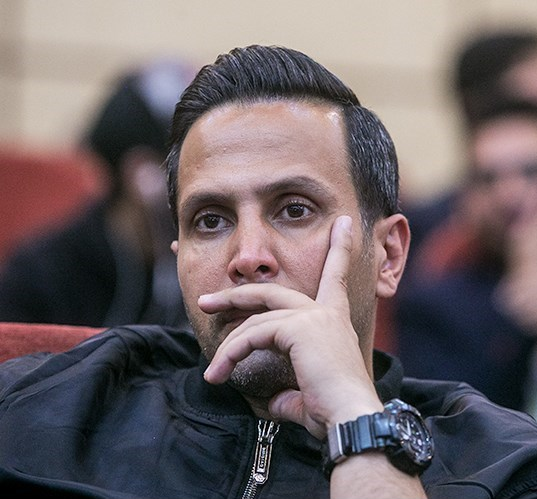

Personal information
- Full name: Hamed Kavianpour
- Date of birth: December 1, 1978 (age 47)
- Place of birth: Tehran, Iran
- Position: Midfielder

Youth career
- 1993–1995: Bonyad Shahid
- 1995–1997: Payam Khorasan
- 1997–1998: Persepolis

Senior career*
Years	Team	Apps	(Gls)
1997–2002	Persepolis	110	(8)
2002–2003	Al-Wasl	16	(4)
2003–2006	Persepolis	41	(1)
2006	Kayserispor	4	(0)
2007–2008	Steel Azin	41	(0)

International career^{‡}
2000–2004	Iran	49	(1)
- * Club domestic league appearances and goals as of 11 May 2010 ‡ National team caps and goals as of 10 October 2026

Hamed Kavianpour (Persian: حامد کاویانپور; born December 1, 1978) is an Iranian retired professional football player who last played for Steel Azin F.C. in the Iranian Azadegan League.

== Club career ==
He has played most of his career for Persepolis FC where he had several good seasons, playing in the midfield with his great skill and dribbling. His critics however claim his dribbling delays the speed of the game.

During 2001 and 2002 some English clubs showed interest in him and he had trials with clubs such as Bolton Wanderers, Ipswich Town F.C., Newcastle United F.C., and Reading F.C., but Persepolis preferred that he sign a one-year contract with UAE club Al Wasl in July 2002.

In May 2006 he signed a two-year contract to play for Turkish club Kayserispor in Süper Lig.

On September 22, 2006 the Turkish club announced that they will release the Iranian midfielder as he was allegedly tested positive for doping after the match against Erciyesspor.

The Turkish Football Federation banned Kavianpour from playing in Turkey for 2 years, however Kavianpour planned to appeal to the Turkish Football Federation in order to reduce the ban. The ban was later reduced to 1 year.

He was backed in Tehran, Iran, played for Steel Azin from 2007 to 2010 amongst a series of big signings of the club such as Ali Karimi and Ferydoon Zandi. In an interview with Iranian TV Channel 3, he mentioned that he plans to play for a division 1 club in 2012.

=== Club career statistics ===
As of 24 May 2010

Club performance			League		Cup		Continental		Total	
Season	Club	League	Apps	Goals	Apps	Goals	Apps	Goals	Apps	Goals
Iran			League		Hazfi Cup		Asia		Total	
1998–99	Persepolis	Azadegan League		0			-	-		
1999–00	Persepolis	Azadegan League						0		
2000–01	Persepolis	Azadegan League	21	2				2		
2001–02	Persepolis	Persian Gulf Cup	23	1				0		
United Arab Emirates			League		President's Cup		Asia		Total	
2002–03	Al Wasl	UAE Football League					-	-		
Iran			League		Hazfi Cup		Asia		Total	
2003–04	Persepolis	Persian Gulf Cup	14	1			-	-		
2004–05	Persepolis	Persian Gulf Cup	2	0			-	-		
2005–06	Persepolis	Persian Gulf Cup	25	0			-	-		
Turkey			League		Turkish Cup		Europe		Total	
2006–07	Kayserispor	Süper Lig	4	0			-	-		
Iran			League		Hazfi Cup		Asia		Total	
2007–08	Steel Azin	Azadegan League		0			-	-		
2009–10	Steel Azin	Persian Gulf Cup	23	0			-	-		
Total	Iran			9				2		
Total	United Arab Emirates						0	0		
Total	Turkey		4	0			0	0		
Career total								2		

- Assist Goals

Season	Team	Assists
05–06	Persepolis	2
09–10	Steel Azin	0

== International career ==
He made his debut for the Iranian national team in March 2000 against Cyprus. He was one of Iran's main players in 2002 World Cup qualifying campaign, which ended with a dramatic 2-1 aggregate defeat against the Republic of Ireland. Until 2004 he was a regular starter for the team and earned 50 caps.
