= Ali Karimi =

Iranian footballer

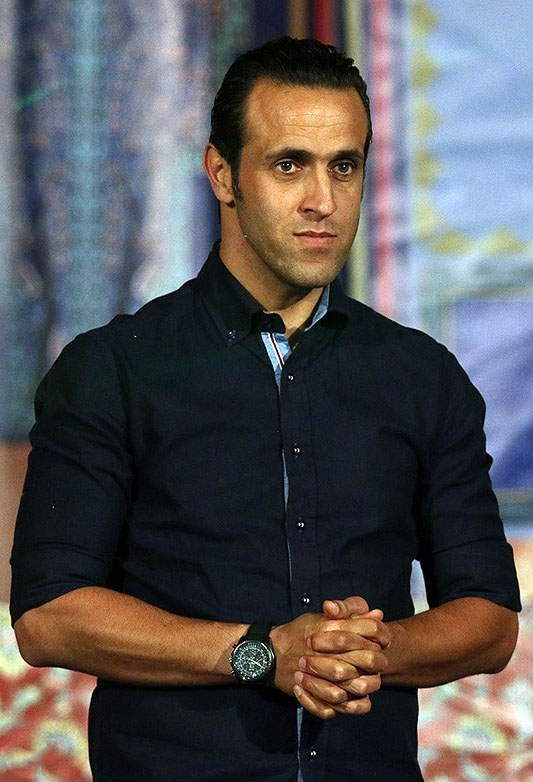
- Karimi in 2015

Personal information
- Full name: Mohammad Ali Karimi Pashaki
- Date of birth: 8 November 1978 (age 48)
- Place of birth: Karaj, Iran
- Height: 1.78 m (5 ft 10 in)
- Positions: Attacking midfielder; forward

Youth career
- 1990–1991: Naft Tehran
- 1991–1994: Saipa
- 1994–1996: Fath Tehran

Senior career*
Years	Team	Apps	(Gls)
1996–1998	Fath Tehran		
1998–2001	Persepolis	42	(11)
2001–2005	Al-Ahli	69	(45)
2005–2007	Bayern Munich	33	(3)
2007–2008	Qatar SC	26	(5)
2008–2009	Persepolis	21	(5)
2009–2011	Steel Azin	40	(14)
2011	Schalke 04	1	(0)
2011–2013	Persepolis	40	(13)
2013–2014	Tractor Sazi	26	(5)
Total		298	(101)

International career
1999	Iran U23	3	(2)
1998–2012	Iran	127	(38)

Managerial career
- 2014: Iran (assistant)
- 2017: Naft Tehran
- 2018: Sepidrood
- 2018–2019: Sepidrood
Medal record
Representing Iran
Asian Games
First place	1998 Bangkok	Team
AFC Asian Cup
Third place	2004 China
- * Club domestic league appearances and goals

Mohammad Ali Karimi Pashaki (Persian: محمد علی کریمی پاشاکی Persian: [æli kæriˈmi]; born 8 November 1978) is an Iranian football coach and former professional player. During his professional football career, he has played as a playmaker in the Iran Pro League, UAE Pro League, Qatar Stars League and Bundesliga. Karimi has scored 38 goals in 127 matches for the Iran national team. In 2004, he was recognized as the best scorer of the AFC Asian Cup and received the Asian Footballer of the Year award in the same year. He announced his retirement at the end of the 2013–14 season and, on 11 April 2014, played the final game of his 18-year career.

Karimi's professional career began with Fath Tehran, where he made his first-team debut in 1996, aged 18. He then played three seasons with Persepolis, winning the Iranian league twice and the Hazfi Cup once with the club. In July 2001, Karimi signed a two-year contract with UAE Pro League club Al-Ahli Dubai. While an Al-Ahli player, Karimi won two cup titles, and was the top goalscorer in the 2003–04 season, an impressive feat for a midfielder. After leaving the club in 2005 aged 26, Karimi made a long-awaited move to Europe to play for Bayern Munich. At the club, he had relative success, winning both the Bundesliga and the DFB-Pokal in 2005–06 season. Later in his career, he rejoined former coach Felix Magath and won a second German Cup with Schalke 04. Karimi ended his playing career in Iran with Persepolis and Tractor Sazi, and with the latter won the Hazfi Cup in the final season of his career.

Karimi made his debut for Iran on 13 October 1998 at the age of 19. He made 127 career appearances in total, appearing at five major tournaments, including 1998 Asian Games, 2000, 2004, and 2007 Asian Cups and 2006 FIFA World Cup. Renowned for his on-the-ball skill, dribbling runs and playmaking ability, he was often referred to as the Asian Maradona and The Magician. In the video introducing Iran's national football team in the 2018 World Cup, by FIFA, he was described as "One of the top 2 players of Iran's football history". He is regarded as one of the greatest Asian footballers of all time. In 2017, AFC named Karimi as "one of the icons of Asian football history".

Karimi is known as one of the most popular athletes in the history of Iran. In April 2015, he was recognized as Iran's most popular football player (from 1991 to 2015) in a poll by Navad television program.

== Club career ==
Karimi started his professional career with second-division side Fath Football Club in 1997 where training was conducted on the streets with a plastic ball.

=== Persepolis ===
In 1998, Karimi joined Persepolis football club, which won the domestic double in 1999 and the championship again in 2000. He attended a trial with Perugia Calcio, but the transfer was aborted when Perugia deemed the transfer fee too high. There was also reportedly an offer from Spain's Atlético Madrid who were willing to pay Karimi £4.3 million in a four-year contract. Still, Karimi opted for United Arab Emirates side Al-Ahli because he wanted to stay close to home.

=== Al-Ahli ===
Karimi signed with Al Ahli in the United Arab Emirates in 2001 for a reported salary of $1.3 million for two years. In that season, Al-Ahli managed to win its first trophy, when they became the Winners of the President Cup in 2001–02 season.

He scored a league-high 14 goals for Al Ahli in 2004. In June 2020, he was named the best foreign player in the UAE League as well.

=== Bayern Munich ===
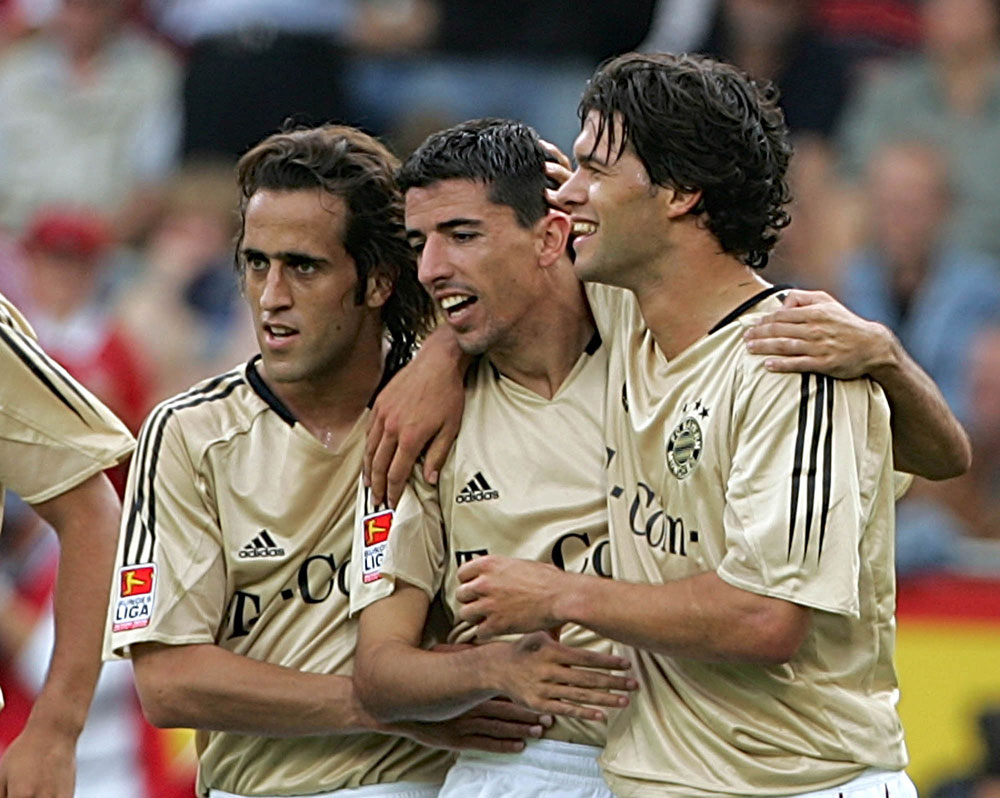
Karimi with Roy Makaay and Michael Ballack during a game in 2006

On 3 May 2005, Bundesliga champions Bayern Munich's website announced that as its first new player for the 2005–06 season, it signed Karimi with a one-year contract, as the third Iranian player of this team, after Ali Daei (1998–99) and Vahid Hashemian (2004–05). After the friendly match between Iran and Germany in October 2004, Karimi was noticed by the Bayern Munich club. He received the best score in kicker magazine after Jens Lehmann.

Karimi entered the field in the second half of the first week of the Bundesliga against Borussia Mönchengladbach. In the second week's 5–2 victory against Bayer Leverkusen, he was recognized as the second best player of the match by scoring a goal and providing an assist. Six weeks into the league, Karimi scored his second goal assist in the Bundesliga, setting the stage for a 1–0 win against Eintracht Frankfurt and was recognized as the man of the match. In week 16 of the Bundesliga, he provided his third assist against Kaiserslautern. At the end of the half-season of the Bundesliga, which was accompanied by Bayern's 2-1 victory over Borussia Dortmund, Karimi scored again. He was also recognized as Bayern Munich's best player by scoring 2.5 points from kicker magazine in the 22nd Bundesliga match, which ended with a 1–1 draw against Hannover.

Karimi made his 25th appearance for Bayern on 4 March 2006 against Hamburg, which resulted in an automatic 12-month extension to his one-year contract that expired on 30 June 2007. But Karimi was injured in the same game and missed all Bayern Munich matches until the end of the 2005-2006 season.

He played 3 times in the UEFA Champions League before getting injured, scoring in his first game against Rapid Vienna. By scoring against Rapid Vienna, Karimi became the only Iranian Bayern Munich player to score in the UEFA Champions League. Before the injury, Karimi played in 20 Bundesliga games, two DFB-Pokal games, one DFL-Ligapokal game and three UEFA Champions League games.

Karimi's average scores in the Bundesliga and the UEFA Champions League in the 2005–06 season are the best among the three Iranian players in the kicker magazine.

Karimi, who was still suffering from the previous season's injury, was injured again before the start of the 2006-2007 season and missed the season's opening games. By the end of the 2006–07 season, he played 16 games (13 Bundesliga games - two UEFA Champions League games and one DFL-Ligapokal game).

In the 32nd week of the Bundesliga, Karimi became the foundation for Bayern's 1–1 draw against Borussia Mönchengladbach by sending a goal assist. In week 34 of the Bundesliga, he played his last game for Bayern in a 5–2 win against Mainz and scored for the last time in Bayern Munich. In this competition after Mehmet Scholl; Karimi was recognized as the second-best player of Bayern together with Hasan Salihamidžić by scoring 2.5 from kicker magazine.

In two seasons in Bayern Munich, Karimi played 42 games (33 Bundesliga games, 5 UEFA Champions League games, 2 DFB-Pokal games and 2 DFL-Ligapokal games) and became the record holder for the most number of games among the three Iranian players of this team. Karimi ended his career in Bayern Munich by scoring four goals and sending four assists. In 2017, the Transfermarkt website named Karimi among the best players who joined Bayern Munich from 1998 to 2017 as a free agent (a player who is eligible to sign a contract with any team and whose contract has expired with his previous team) and performed well. In this team have been placed.

"My first year at Bayern, a pleasure to play with this legend Ali Karimi. He is the best ever from Iran,"

— Lukas Podolski, Ali Karimi's teammate in Bayern Munich / 2020

After Karimi's position in support of the 2022 Iranian protests following the death of Mahsa Amini, FC Bayern Munich announced on 5 November 2022 that "due to concerns regarding the health condition of Ali Karimi and other Iranian players of Bayern Munich, we have long since been in touch with the German ambassador to Tehran. The club is aware of the current critical situation in Iran and is ready to provide any assistance in this matter".

=== Qatar SC ===
On 3 July 2007, Karimi announced that he had signed a two-year deal with Qatar Sports Club. Karimi was believed to have signed a contract worth around £3.2 million, with a clause allowing him to return to Europe anytime.

On 13 July 2008, Karimi signed a two-year contract with Al-Sailiya that is said to be worth around £4.7 million.

=== Persepolis ===
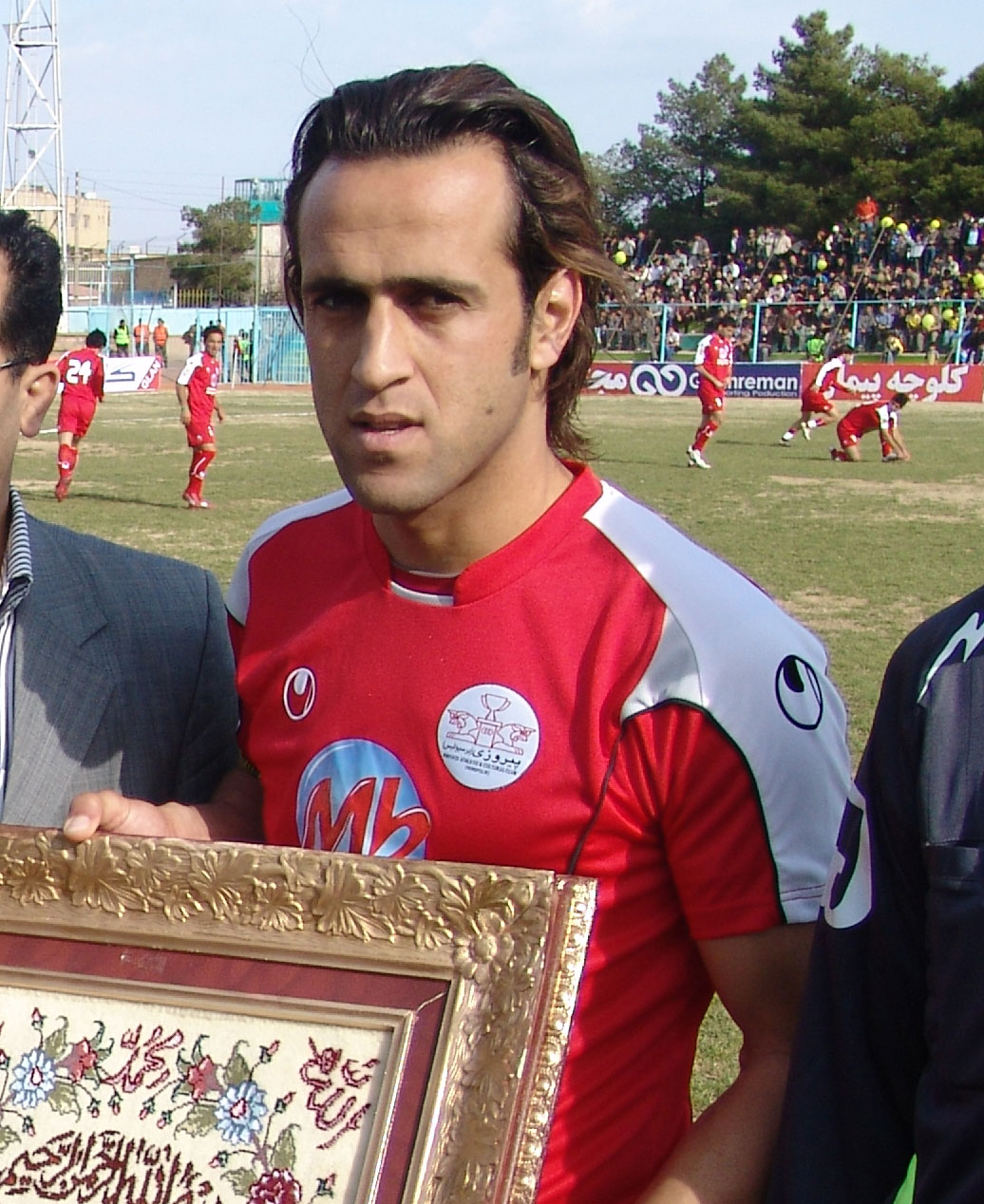
Karimi as captain of Persepolis before a friendly match

Persepolis' then chairman, Dariush Mostafavi, reached an agreement with Karimi after a one-hour-long telephone conversation. Persepolis had to pay Al-Sailiyah to release Karimi from his contract. Mostafavi claimed the release fee was around US$310,000. Karimi joined Persepolis on loan, and signed with Persepolis on a one-year contract on 6 September 2008.

Karimi scored his first goal since his return to Persepolis in the Tehran derby. With Esteghlal leading 1–0, Karimi equalized for Persepolis two minutes from time. On 9 October 2008, Karimi scored a hat trick against Abumoslem but could not prevent Persepolis losing 4–3.

However, Karimi's contract was not extended, reportedly because of a strained relationship with Persepolis chief executive Abbas Ansarifard. While Ansarifard claimed that the club offered Karimi a contract, but he did not show up, Karimi claimed that Persepolis kept him waiting for four weeks for nothing.

=== Steel Azin ===
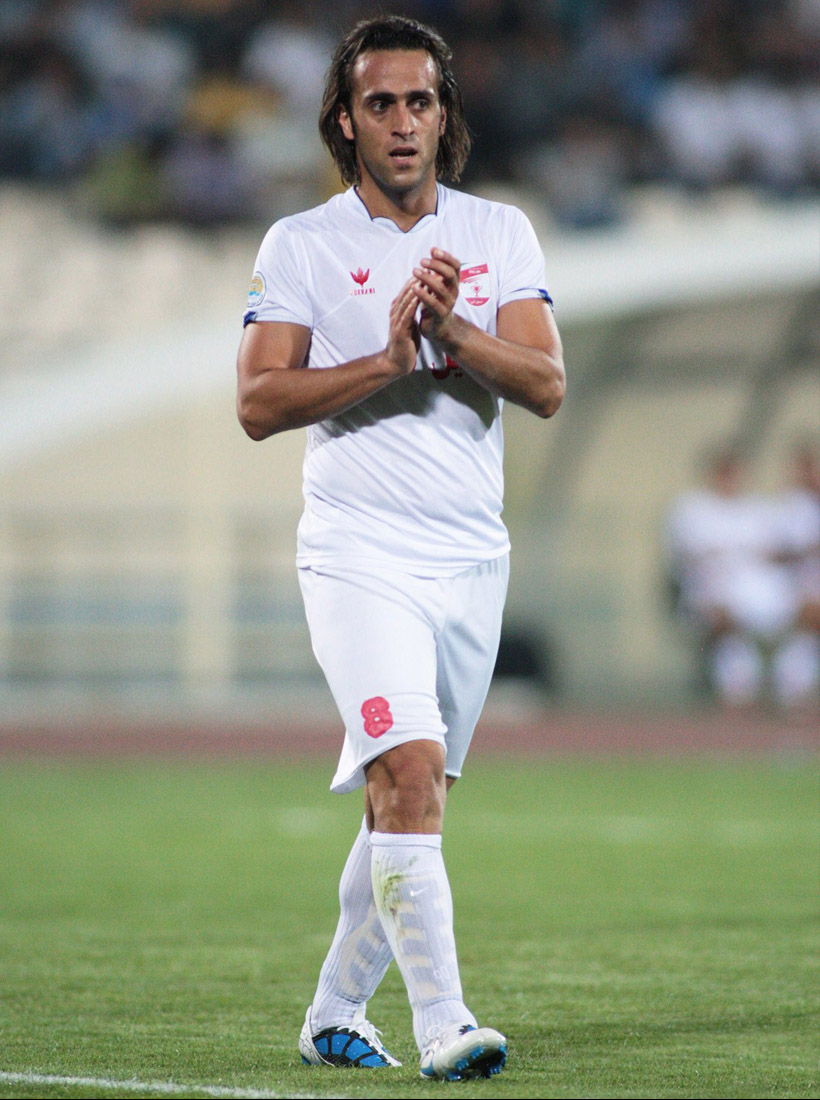
Ali Karimi while playing for Steel Azin

Karimi joined newly promoted Steel Azin on 29 July 2009 on a one-year deal. He was reported to be paid US$400,000 for the season.

After joining Steel Azin, Karimi scored for four consecutive matches at the start of the season. On 14 August 2009, he scored the second goal in Steel Azin's 4–3 win over Saba. He scored a brace against Shahin in Steel Azin's 2–1 victory. On 4 December 2009, Karimi converted a penalty in the 52nd minute against Pas FC to score his 11th goal of the season. On 6 March 2010, during his team's match against Saipa, Karimi was sent off for pushing Majid Ayoubi after Ayoubi had fouled him.

In January 2010, it was reported that Al-Ahli made an offer of US$500,000 to sign Karimi on a loan deal until the end of the 2009–10 season, which Steel Azin rejected.

Karimi was sacked by the club in August 2010 for failing to observe the fast requirement during Ramadan, but was reinstated a few days later after paying a fine. The player maintained that he had not shown disrespect to Islam.

=== Schalke 04 ===
Karimi signed a five-month deal for Schalke on 31 January 2011 upon passing a medical examination. He made his first appearance for the German club on 5 April 2011, coming on for Raúl in the second half in a Champions League quarter-final match against Inter Milan before coming on as a substitute against 1. FC Kaiserslautern in the German Bundesliga in his second and final match for Schalke. He won the German Cup for the second time before the end of his contract.

=== Persepolis ===
On 15 June 2011, Persepolis chairman Habib Kashani announced that they had reached an agreement with Karimi. He played for Persepolis in the 2011–12 Persian Gulf Cup and the 2011–12 Hazfi Cup. This was the second time that Karimi returned to his native club, Persepolis. Karimi was also appointed as Club captain. He made his debut in a match against Malavan and scored his first goal in the season for Persepolis in a match against Shahrdari Tabriz. He extended his contract with Persepolis for another season on 18 June 2012. He was injured a few times during the season and was unable to perform very well and at the end of the season, he announced his retirement from football.

=== Tractor Sazi ===
On 13 June 2013, Karimi returned from retirement and joined Tractor Sazi, signing a one-year contract with Tractor Sazi. He made his first appearance for Tractor Sazi in Iran Pro League against his former club Persepolis. Karimi scored his first goal in the Iran Pro League in Tractor's 4–2 win over Zob Ahan. He helped Tractor to win the season's Hazfi Cup, his first title in Iranian football after his return from European Football.

On 20 July 2014, Karimi announced his retirement by publishing a letter on his YouTube account. At the time, Karimi was aged 35 and played professional football for 18 years.

== International career ==
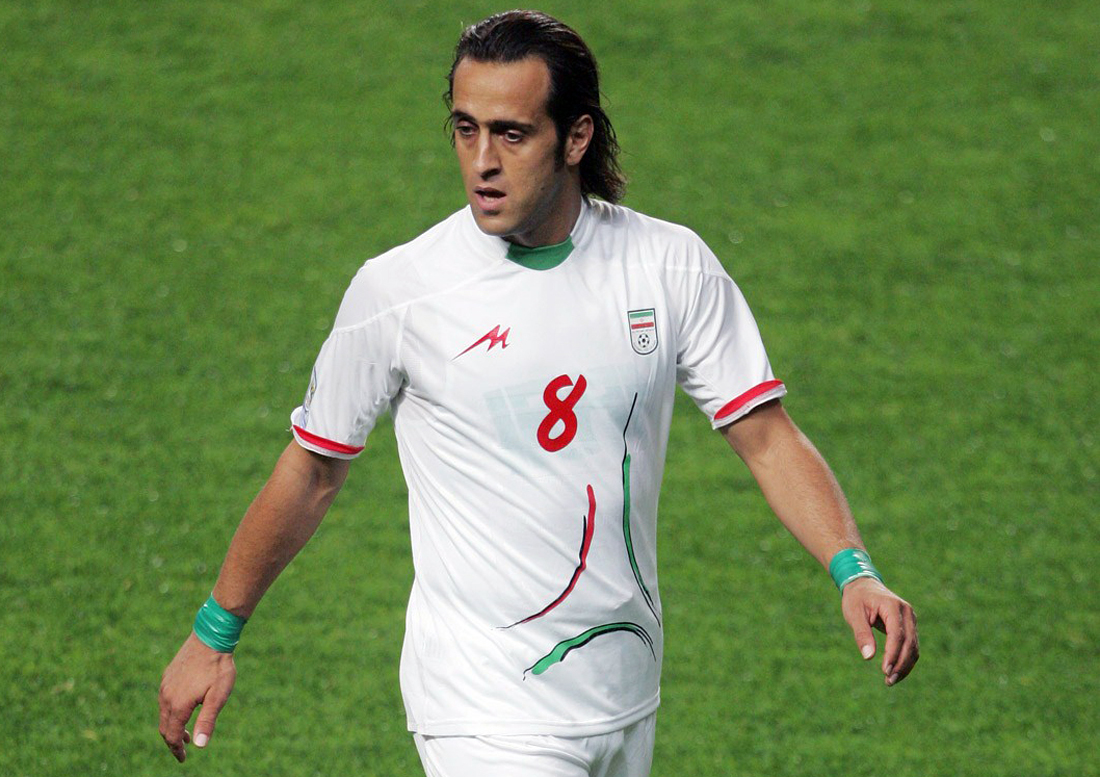
Karimi playing for Iran against South Korea, Seoul World Cup Stadium

Karimi made his debut for Iran national team in October 1998 in a match against Kuwait. That same year, he won the Gold Medal with Iran at the 1998 Asian Games. Karimi scored one of Iran's two goals in the final against Kuwait.

He was also one of Iran's main players in its 2002 FIFA World Cup qualification campaign. In 2001, after losing to Bahrain and drawing with Thailand, Iran finished second in their qualifying group. It had to play a home-and-away play-off with the Republic of Ireland for a spot at the 2002 World Cup. Karimi started as an attacking midfielder in the first game in Dublin and used his acceleration on the break and his dribbling to attack Ireland's defense. However, he was also off target on a number of occasions, and Iran lost the match 2–0. They won the return leg 1–0 but missed the final.

At the 2004 Asian Cup, Karimi scored five goals, making him joint top scorer. Iran finished third in the overall tournament, behind Japan and China. In the quarter-final, Karimi scored a hat trick in Iran's 4–3 win over South Korea. Karimi was given the prestigious Asian Player of the Year award in 2004, joining his fellow Iranians, Mahdavikia in 2003, Ali Daei in 1999, and Khodadad Azizi in 1996. He also won the 2004 West Asian Football Federation Championship with Team Melli.

His performance in the Iran–Germany friendly game for Bam victims held in Azadi Stadium in Tehran in October 2004 was said to be the reason behind Bayern's interest in the player.

Coming off a serious ankle injury, Karimi had a poor World Cup finals at Germany 2006. He was unable to exert much influence on proceedings as the Iranians lost 3–1 to Mexico and 2–0 to Portugal. He was substituted in the 65th minute of the Portugal game and kicked the team's sports bags by the dugout. Iran's then manager Branko Ivankovic said he may drop Karimi in the upcoming game due to disciplinary reasons. Karimi did not play in the 1–1 draw against Angola, but Ivankovic attributed Karimi's omission to his refusal to play because of an injury.

Karimi played in the 2007 Asian Cup. In May 2008, Karimi was banned from playing in the national team after he made criticisms towards the IRIFF in the Ardebil training ground, but was reinstated in the national squad after intervention from Iranian President Mahmoud Ahmadinejad and Hassan Khomeini, the grandson of revolutionary leader Ayatollah Ruhollah Khomeini.

In October 2008, Karimi retired from Team Melli. Ali Daei, the then-Iran football coach, said Karimi would never be called up again. In April 2009, Karimi announced that he was ready again to serve his country if he was to be picked by Team Melli coach, Afshin Ghotbi.

He played in 2010 FIFA World Cup qualification for Iran and on 10 June 2009, Karimi scored in a 1–0 victory over U.A.E. to keep Iran's 2010 World Cup qualifying hopes alive. On 17 June 2009, he played in Iran's 1–1 draw with South Korea, which eliminated Iran from the 2010 World Cup finals. During the match, a number of Iranian players, including Karimi, wore green wristbands, which were interpreted to be a show of support for Iranian opposition leader Hossein Mousavi, who accused the Iranian government of vote rigging the election on 12 June. Western media reported after the game that the players who wore the green wristbands had been banned lifetime to play in national team, while a newspaper in Iran reported that the players concerned had retired. On 24 June 2009, FIFA wrote to Iran's football federation asking for clarification on the situation. The Iranian football federation replied that no disciplinary action had been taken against any player. On 3 March 2010, he returned for the 2011 AFC Asian Cup qualification match against Thailand.

He was invited to the national football team again by Carlos Queiroz in 2011 to play in the 2014 FIFA World Cup qualification and played for the team until his retirement in 2013. Queiroz later announced that Karimi was one of his best players during his coaching times. He is currently the third most-capped player and the third-highest scorer of Iran.

== Style of play ==
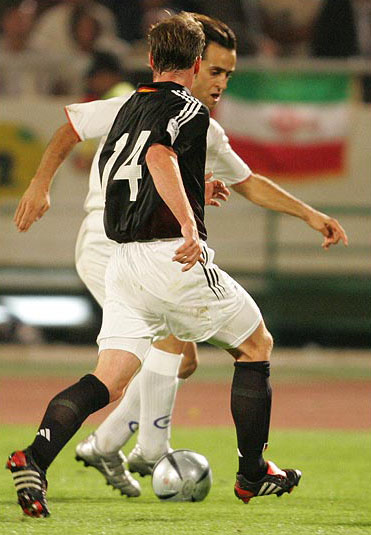
Ali Karimi during a friendly match against Germany at Azadi (Freedom) stadium in Tehran, 2004

Karimi's most famous football feature is his dribbling skills. In 2003, World Soccer described him as a player with "hypnotic movements and ball work". In 2004, kicker magazine called Karimi the "Maradona of Asia" in a report: "He shoots well with both feet, changes direction very quickly and is a player who makes the opposing team dizzy."

"Ali Karimi made us dizzy with his technique in the friendly match of 2004 (Iran 0 - Germany 2)"

— Per Mertesacker's memory of the friendly match between Iran and Germany/2004

During the coaching of Branko Ivankovic, when the Iran national team usually played with a 4-2-3-1 formation, Karimi played mostly in the attacking midfield position. FIFA magazine described Karimi as a professional playmaker in the April 2006 issue.

According to FIFA in 2009, Karimi's "stunning dribbles" are one of the characteristics of Karimi's game, and because of this, he is known as "Magician".

In a report in 2017, AFC called Karimi the "Maradona of Asia" and introduced him as "one of the Icons of Asian football history". In the continuation of this report, "magical dribbling skills" and "a knack for the unpredictable" are mentioned as characteristics of Karimi's game.

== Managerial career ==
On 25 September 2014, Karimi was named as the assistant coach by Carlos Queiroz in the Iranian national team. However, he stepped down from his role shortly before the 2015 AFC Asian Cup. Later in June 2017, he was appointed Naft Tehran manager but has not signed a contract with the team and left the team before the start of the league. However, Karimi resigned with Naft in September. On 1 January 2018, he became the head coach of Sepidrood while Sepidrood was in the bottom two, but he kept this team in the Persian Gulf Pro League.

== Personal life ==
Ali Karimi married Sahar Davari in 1999, at the age of 21. The couple has a daughter named Hima and two sons named Havash and Hirsa.

Karimi publicly supported the Mahsa Amini protests against the government of Iran in late 2022. He posted on Instagram that not even holy water could "wash away this disgrace" of Amini's death. In addition to his criticism of the government, he used his platform of 14+ million followers to advise Iranians on how to bypass Internet censorship in their country. Based in Dubai, he was charged in absentia by Iran with "encouraging riots", and his house in Lavasan was seized by the Iranian state. Karimi was also reportedly the target of a kidnapping attempt by the Iranian government. After leaving Iran, Karimi lived in Dubai before moving to the United States in 2023.

On 21 December 2022, after Karimi's meeting with Frank-Walter Steinmeier, the German president, Steinmeier, emphasized his support for the Iranian protesters.

On 18 January 2023, Karimi publicly tweeted his support for exiled crown prince Reza Pahlavi to assume a role as representative of the Iranian people pending a national referendum.

During the 2025–2026 Iranian protests and the ensuing 2026 Iran massacres, Karimi spoke at a January diaspora rally in Los Angeles and called for political change in Iran. He also wrote an open letter to FIFA and all its member football associations, calling on FIFA president Gianni Infantino to speak up on the protest deaths.

== Career statistics ==
=== Club ===
Appearances and goals by club, season and competition
Club	Season	League			National cup (Note: Includes Hazfi Cup, DFB-Pokal)		League cup (Note: Includes UAE League Cup, DFL-Ligapokal)		Continental		Total	
Club	Season	Division	Apps	Goals	Apps	Goals	Apps	Goals	Apps	Goals	Apps	Goals
Persepolis	1998–99	Azadegan League	13	3	0	0	—		—		13	3
Persepolis	1999–2000	Azadegan League	10	3	0	0	—		5 (Note: Appearances in Asian Club Championship)	1	15	4
Persepolis	2000–01	Azadegan League	19	5	2	0	—		8	4	29	9
Persepolis	Total		42	11	2	0	—		13	5	57	16
Al-Ahli	2001–02	UAE League		14			—		—			
Al-Ahli	2002–03	UAE League		5			—		2 (Note: Appearances in AFC Champions League)	0		
Al-Ahli	2003–04	UAE League		15			—		—			
Al-Ahli	2004–05	UAE League		11			—		6	2		
Al-Ahli	Total		69	45	30	29	9	5	8	2	116	81
Bayern Munich	2005–06	Bundesliga	20	2	2	0	1	0	3 (Note: Appearances in UEFA Champions League)	1	26	3
Bayern Munich	2006–07	Bundesliga	13	1	0	0	1	0	2	0	16	1
Bayern Munich	Total		33	3	2	0	2	0	5	1	42	4
Qatar SC	2007–08	Qatar Stars League	26	5	2	0	2	1	—		30	6
Persepolis	2008–09	Persian Gulf Cup	21	5	1	0	—		6	2	28	7
Steel Azin	2009–10	Persian Gulf Cup	28	14	3	1	—		—		31	15
Steel Azin	2010–11	Persian Gulf Cup	12	0	0	0	—		—		12	0
Steel Azin	Total		40	14	3	1	—		—		43	15
Schalke 04	2010–11	Bundesliga	1	0	0	0	0	0	1	0	2	0
Persepolis	2011–12	Persian Gulf Cup	28	12	2	0	—		7	3	37	15
Persepolis	2012–13	Persian Gulf Cup	12	1	3	0	—		—		15	1
Persepolis	Total		40	13	5	0	0	0	7	3	52	16
Tractor Sazi	2013–14	Persian Gulf Cup	26	5	4	0	—		5	0	34	5
Career total			298	101	51	30	13	6	45	13	407	150

=== International ===
Appearances and goals by national team and year
National team	Year	Apps	Goals
Iran	1998	9	1
Iran	2000	21	9
Iran	2001	19	6
Iran	2002	7	4
Iran	2003	7	4
Iran	2004	17	7
Iran	2005	8	0
Iran	2006	9	4
Iran	2007	6	0
Iran	2008	5	0
Iran	2009	3	1
Iran	2010	1	0
Iran	2011	6	1
Iran	2012	9	1
Total		127	38

Scores and results list Iran's goal tally first, score column indicates score after each Karimi goal.

List of international goals scored by Ali Karimi
No.	Date	Venue	Opponent	Score	Result	Competition
1	19 December 1998	Rajamangala Stadium, Bangkok, Thailand	Kuwait	1–0	2–0	1998 Asian Games
2	9 April 2000	Azadi Stadium, Tehran, Iran	Bahrain	2–0	3–0	2000 AFC Asian Cup qualification
3	24 May 2000	King Abdullah II Stadium, Amman, Jordan	Kazakhstan	1–0	3–0	2000 West Asian Football Federation Championship
4	24 May 2000	King Abdullah II Stadium, Amman, Jordan	Kazakhstan	3–0	3–0	2000 West Asian Football Federation Championship
5	28 May 2000	King Abdullah II Stadium, Amman, Jordan	Syria	1–0	1–0	2000 West Asian Football Federation Championship
6	31 May 2000	King Abdullah II Stadium, Amman, Jordan	Jordan	1–0	1–0	2000 West Asian Football Federation Championship
7	24 November 2000	Takhti Stadium, Tabriz, Iran	Guam	3–0	19–0	2002 FIFA World Cup qualification
8	24 November 2000	Takhti Stadium, Tabriz, Iran	Guam	11–0	19–0	2002 FIFA World Cup qualification
9	24 November 2000	Takhti Stadium, Tabriz, Iran	Guam	12–0	19–0	2002 FIFA World Cup qualification
10	24 November 2000	Takhti Stadium, Tabriz, Iran	Guam	19–0	19–0	2002 FIFA World Cup qualification
11	10 August 2001	Azadi Stadium, Tehran, Iran	Bosnia and Herzegovina	2–0	4–0	2001 LG Cup Final
12	15 August 2001	Tehelné pole, Bratislava, Slovakia	Slovakia	1–0	4–3	Friendly
13	15 August 2001	Tehelné pole, Bratislava, Slovakia	Slovakia	2–0	4–3	Friendly
14	15 August 2001	Tehelné pole, Bratislava, Slovakia	Slovakia	4–3	4–3	Friendly
15	7 September 2001	Al-Shaab Stadium, Baghdad, Iraq	Iraq	1–1	2–1	2002 FIFA World Cup qualification
16	12 October 2001	Azadi Stadium, Tehran, Iran	Iraq	2–1	2–1	2002 FIFA World Cup qualification
17	6 February 2002	Azadi Stadium, Tehran, Iran	Slovakia	1–1	2–3	Friendly
18	6 February 2002	Azadi Stadium, Tehran, Iran	Slovakia	2–3	2–3	Friendly
19	11 August 2002	Takhti Stadium, Tabriz, Iran	Azerbaijan	1–1	1–1	Friendly
20	3 September 2002	Abbasiyyin Stadium, Damascus, Syria	Lebanon	2–0	2–0	2002 West Asian Football Federation Championship
21	12 October 2003	Azadi Stadium, Tehran, Iran	New Zealand	1–0	3–0	AFC/OFC Cup Challenge
22	12 October 2003	Azadi Stadium, Tehran, Iran	New Zealand	2–0	3–0	AFC/OFC Cup Challenge
23	27 October 2003	Kim Il Sung Stadium, Pyongyang, North Korea	North Korea	1–0	3–1	2004 AFC Asian Cup qualification
24	27 October 2003	Kim Il Sung Stadium, Pyongyang, North Korea	North Korea	2–1	3–1	2004 AFC Asian Cup qualification
25	21 June 2004	Azadi Stadium, Tehran, Iran	Syria	6–1	7–1	2004 West Asian Football Federation Championship
26	25 June 2004	Azadi Stadium, Tehran, Iran	Syria	1–1	4–1	2004 West Asian Football Federation Championship
27	24 July 2004	Chongqing Olympic Sports Center, Chongqing, China	Oman	1–2	2–2	2004 AFC Asian Cup
28	31 July 2004	Shandong Provincial Stadium, Shandong, China	South Korea	1–0	4–3	2004 AFC Asian Cup
29	31 July 2004	Shandong Provincial Stadium, Shandong, China	South Korea	2–1	4–3	2004 AFC Asian Cup
30	31 July 2004	Shandong Provincial Stadium, Shandong, China	South Korea	4–3	4–3	2004 AFC Asian Cup
31	6 August 2004	Workers' Stadium, Beijing, China	Bahrain	2–1	4–2	2004 AFC Asian Cup
32	30 January 2006	Azadi Stadium, Tehran, Iran	Costa Rica	1–0	3–2	Friendly
33	28 May 2006	Gradski Vrt Stadium, Osijek, Croatia	Croatia	1–0	2–2	Friendly
34	11 October 2006	Taipei Municipal Stadium, Taipei, Chinese Taipei	Chinese Taipei	1–0	2–0	2007 AFC Asian Cup qualification
35	11 October 2006	Taipei Municipal Stadium, Taipei, Chinese Taipei	Chinese Taipei	2–0	2–0	2007 AFC Asian Cup qualification
36	10 June 2009	Azadi Stadium, Tehran, Iran	United Arab Emirates	1–0	1–0	2010 FIFA World Cup qualification
37	23 July 2011	Azadi Stadium, Tehran, Iran	Maldives	3–0	4–0	2014 FIFA World Cup qualification
38	23 February 2012	Zabeel Stadium, Dubai, United Arab Emirates	Jordan	1–2	2–2	Friendly

== Managerial statistics ==
As of 10 February 2019

Team	From	To	Record							
Team	From	To	G	W	D	L	GF	GA	±	Win %
Naft Tehran	7 September 2017	2 October 2017	3	1	1	1	2	3	−1	33.33
Sepidrood Rasht	1 January 2018	1 July 2018	13	6	3	4	11	14	−3	46.15
Sepidrood Rasht	25 August 2018	Present	14	4	4	6	8	16	−8	28.57
Total			30	11	8	11	20	33	−13	36.67

== Honours ==
Persepolis

- Iranian Football League: 1998–99, 1999–2000
- Hazfi Cup: 1998–99
- Asian Club Championship: third place 1999–2000, third place 2000–01

Al-Ahli

- UAE Cup: 2001–02, 2003–04

Bayern Munich

- Bundesliga: 2005–06
- DFB-Pokal: 2005–06

Schalke 04

- DFB-Pokal: 2010–11

Tractor Sazi

- Hazfi Cup: 2013–14

Iran

- Asian Games Gold Medal: 1998
- West Asian Football Federation Championship: 2000, 2004
- AFC/OFC Cup Challenge: 2003
- Asian Cup: third place 2004

Individual

- Asian Footballer of the Year: 2004; runner-up: 2012
- West Asian Football Federation Championship MVP: 2000
- UAE Pro League best foreign player: 2002–03
- UAE Pro League best player: 2003–04
- UAE Pro League top scorer: 2003–04
- Best foreign player in UAE Pro League history (based on a poll run by Al Bayan newspaper in 2020)
- Asian Cup top scorer: 2004
- Asian Cup All-Star Team: 2004
- AFC/OFC Cup Challenge MVP: 2003
- AFC Asian Player of the Month: 2000 (June), 2001 (October), 2003 (October)
- iran Pro League top scoring midfielder: 2009–10 (14 goals), 2011–12 (12 goals)
- Top scoring midfielder of Persepolis F.C. in AFC Champions League (ten goals)
- One of the top 2 players of Iran's football history chosen by FIFA (Iran national football team's introduction Video for 2018 FIFA World Cup)
- AFC Asian Cup Fans' All-time Best XI: 2018
- Marca Fans' Top Iranian footballer of all time: 2019

== See also ==
- List of men's footballers with 100 or more international caps
