= Aref Mohammadvand =

Iranian footballer

Personal information
- Full name: Aref Mohammadvand
- Date of birth: June 11, 1970 (age 56)
- Place of birth: Bandar Anzali, Iran
- Position: Midfielder

Senior career*
Years	Team	Apps	(Gls)
- Malavan
- Pas Tehran
–2002	Zob Ahan		
2002–2005	Persepolis	61	(3)
2005–2006	Pegah		
2006–2007	Teraktorsazi		
- * Club domestic league appearances and goals

Aref Mohammadvand (Persian: عارف محمدوند) born July 11, 1970) is an Iranian retired football player. He played for Malavan and Persepolis F.C.

Season	Team	Division	Apps	Goals
2002–03	Persepolis	1	20	3
2003–04	Persepolis	1	18	0
2004–05	Persepolis	1	23	0
