= Ali Lashgari =

Iranian footballer

Personal information
- Place of birth: Iran
- Position: Forward

Senior career*
Years	Team	Apps	(Gls)
2001–2003	Persepolis	10	(1)
	Saipa	0	(0)
- Kaveh Tehran
- * Club domestic league appearances and goals

Ali Lashgari (Persian: علی لشگری) is an Iranian former football player who played for Persepolis in Iran Pro League.

== Club career ==
=== Club career statistics ===
Club performance			League		Cup		Continental		Total	
Season	Club	League	Apps	Goals	Apps	Goals	Apps	Goals	Apps	Goals
Iran			League		Hazfi Cup		Asia		Total	
2000–01	Persepolis	Azadegan League	1	0	0	0	0	0	1	0
2001–02	Persepolis	Iran Pro League	3	0	0	0	-	-	3	0
Career total			4	0	0	0	0	0	4	0
