= Hassan Khanmohammadi =

Iranian footballer (born 1977)

Personal information
- Full name: Hassan Khanmohammadi
- Date of birth: March 19, 1977 (age 49)
- Place of birth: Tehran, Iran
- Positions: Full back; winger

Youth career
- Shariati Football School
- Shahin
- Bahman

Senior career*
Years	Team	Apps	(Gls)
1999–2000	Bahman		
2000–2005	Persepolis	75	(4)
- * Club domestic league appearances and goals

Hassan Khanmohammadi (Persian: حسن خانمحمدی, born March 19, 1977, in Tehran) is a retired Iranian footballer who played for Persepolis. He joined Persepolis with his teammate and friend in Bahman, Reza Jabbari, in 2000 won 2001–02 Iran Pro League with the club. Khanmohammadi left them in 2005. He was forced to retire after several harsh injuries.

== Club career ==
=== Club career statistics ===
Club performance			League		Cup		Continental		Total	
Season	Club	League	Apps	Goals	Apps	Goals	Apps	Goals	Apps	Goals
Iran			League		Hazfi Cup		Asia		Total	
2000–01	Persepolis	Azadegan League	13	2	2	0	5	0	20	3
2001–02	Persepolis	Iran Pro League	25	1	1	0	–		26	1
2002–03	Persepolis	Iran Pro League	24	0			3	2		
2003–04	Persepolis	Iran Pro League	13	1			–			
2004–05	Persepolis	Iran Pro League	0	0	0	0	–		0	0
Career total				75	4		8	2		

== Honours ==
=== Club ===
Persepolis

- Persian Gulf Pro League (1) : 2001–02
