= Behnam Seraj =

Iranian footballer and coach

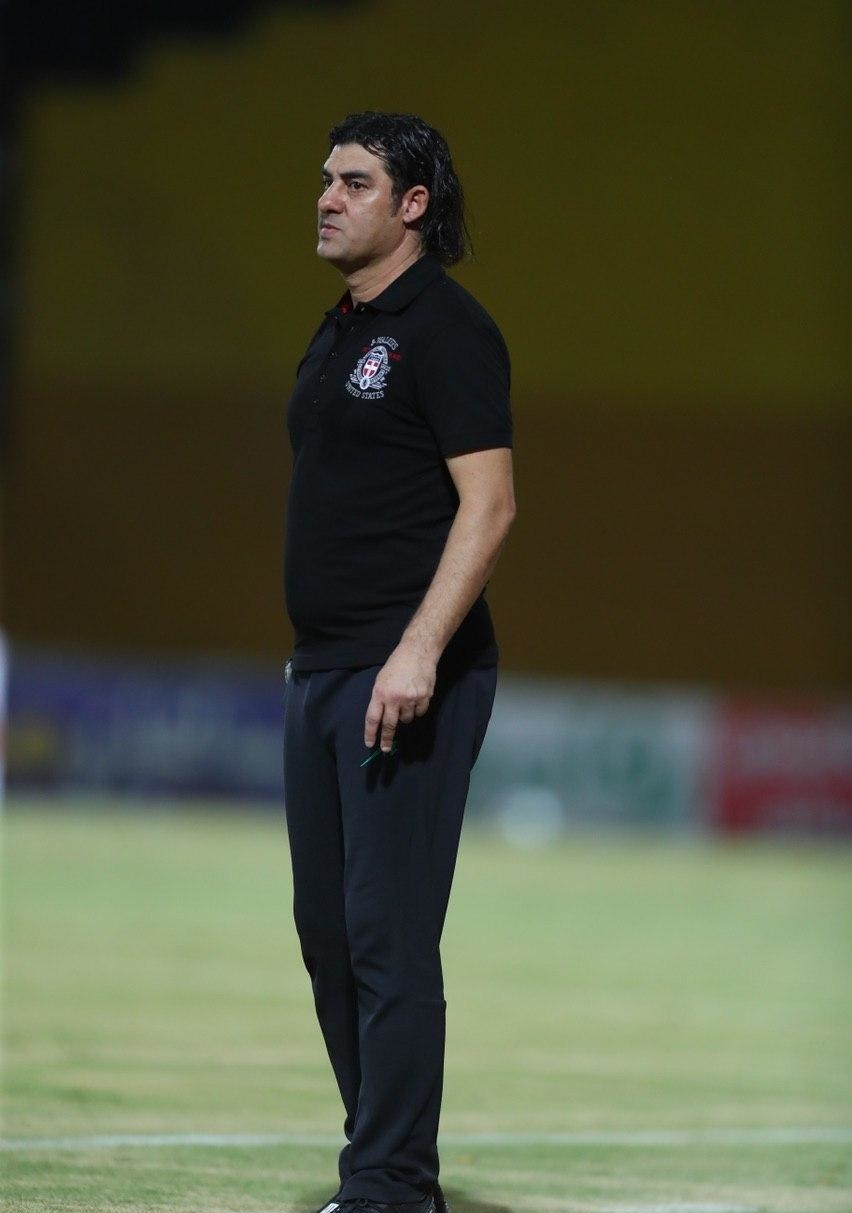

Personal information
- Full name: Behnam Seraj
- Date of birth: June 19, 1971 (age 55)
- Place of birth: Abadan, Iran
- Height: 1.84 m (6 ft 1/2 in)
- Position: Striker

Youth career
- 1992–1995: Sanat Naft

Senior career*
Years	Team	Apps	(Gls)
1995–1998	Sanat Naft		
1998–2000	Persepolis	61	(22)
2000–2003	Foolad	?	(21)
2003–2004	Paykan	?	(0)
2004–2007	Sanat Naft		

International career
1997–1998	Iran	2	(0)

Managerial career
- 2013–2014: Sanat Naft (assistant)
- 2014–2015: Sanat Naft
- 2015–2017: Be'sat
- 2017–2020: Sanat Naft (assistant)
- 2020: Sanat Naft
- * Club domestic league appearances and goals

Behnam Seraj (Persian: بهنام سراج; born June 19, 1971) is a retired Iranian football player and manager. He previously played for the Iran national football team. He was one of the most successful strikers in the Iran Pro League.

== Honours ==
Persepolis

- Iranian Football League (2):1998–99, 1999–00
- Hazfi Cup (1): 1998–99
