= Reza Jabbari =

Iranian footballer

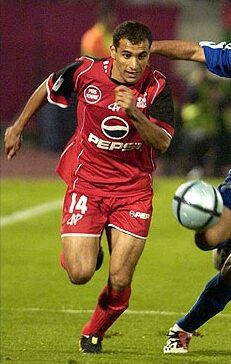

Personal information
- Full name: Reza Jabbari
- Date of birth: August 28, 1977 (age 49)
- Place of birth: Tehran, Iran
- Positions: Left midfielder; attacking midfielder

Youth career
- Pas
- Defense Industries
- 1997–1999: Malavan
- 1999–2000: Bahman

Senior career*
Years	Team	Apps	(Gls)
1999–2000	Bahman	23	(7)
2000–2005	Persepolis	91	(19)
2005–2006	Aboumoslem	10	(1)
2006–2007	Tractor Sazi	16	(4)
2007–2009	Steel Azin	23	(2)

International career
2000	Iran	1	(0)
- * Club domestic league appearances and goals

Reza Jabbari (Persian: رضا جباری, born August 28, 1977, in Tehran) is a retired Iranian footballer. In 2000, he joined Persepolis with his teammate and friend in Bahman, Hassan Khanmohammadi.

== Club career ==
=== Club career statistics ===
Club performance			League		Cup		Continental		Total	
Season	Club	League	Apps	Goals	Apps	Goals	Apps	Goals	Apps	Goals
Iran			League		Hazfi Cup		Asia		Total	
1999–00	Bahman	Azadegan League	23	7			-	-		
2000–01	Persepolis	Azadegan League	17	3	2	0	5	0	24	3
2001–02	Persepolis	Iran Pro League	19	5	2	0	-	-	21	5
2002–03	Persepolis	Iran Pro League	17	5			3	0		
2003–04	Persepolis	Iran Pro League	14	3			-	-		
2004–05	Persepolis	Iran Pro League	24	3			-	-		
2005–06	Aboumoslem	Iran Pro League	10	1			-	-		
2006–07	Tractor Sazi	Division 1					-	-		
2007–08	Steel Azin	Division 1					-	-		
2008–09	Steel Azin	Division 1					-	-		
Career total										

== Honours ==
Persepolis

- Iran Pro League: 2001–02
