= Ali Salmani =

Iranian footballer (born 1979)

Personal information
- Full name: Ali Salmani
- Date of birth: May 10, 1979 (age 47)
- Place of birth: Tehran, Iran
- Position: Wide midfielder

Senior career*
Years	Team	Apps	(Gls)
2001–2002	Bargh Tehran		
2002–2005	Persepolis	38	(4)
2005–2006	Pegah Gilan		
2006–2007	Saba Battery	16	(1)
2007–2008	Steel Azin		(1)
2008	Wind Dubai		
2009	Homa		
2009	Tarbiat Yazd		
2009–2010	Paykan	25	(0)
2011	Shahin Bushehr	12	(0)
2011–2012	Aboomoslem	17	(0)
2012–2013	Shahrdari Arak	0	(0)
- * Club domestic league appearances and goals

Ali Salmani (Persian: علی سلمانی, born May 10, 1979) is an Iranian footballer.

== Club career ==
=== Club Career Statistics ===
Last Update 19 October 2010

Club performance			League		Cup		Continental		Total	
Season	Club	League	Apps	Goals	Apps	Goals	Apps	Goals	Apps	Goals
Iran			League		Hazfi Cup		Asia		Total	
2002–03	Persepolis	Pro League	7	1			1	0		
2003–04	Persepolis	Pro League	18	3			-	-		
2004–05	Persepolis	Pro League	13	0			-	-		
2005–06	Pegah	Division 1					-	-		
2006–07	Saba Battery	Pro League	16	1			-	-		
2007–08	Steel Azin	Division 1		1			-	-		
United Arab Emirates			League		President's Cup		Asia		Total	
2007–08	Wind Dubai	UAE Football League					-	-		
Iran			League		Hazfi Cup		Asia		Total	
2008–09	Homa	Division 1		0			-	-		
2008–09	Tarbiat Yazd	Division 1		0			-	-		
2009–10	Paykan	Pro League	25	0			-	-		
2010–11	Shahin Bushehr	Pro League	12	0			-	-		
2010–11	Paykan	Pro League	17	0	1	0	-	-	18	0
Total	Iran									
Career total										

- Assist Goals

Season	Team	Assists
09–10	Paykan	4
10–11	Paykan	0
