= Mohammad Barzegar =

Iranian footballer

Personal information
- Full name: Mohammad Barzegar
- Date of birth: July 24, 1976 (age 50)
- Place of birth: Tehran, Iran
- Position: Left winger

Youth career
- Bank Melli

Senior career*
Years	Team	Apps	(Gls)
- Bank Melli
1997–1999	Fajr Sepasi		
1999–2004	Persepolis	61	(3)
- Sanat Naft Abadan
- Shahrdari Bandar Abbas
- Tarbiat Yazd

International career
1998–2000	Iran	2	(0)
- * Club domestic league appearances and goals

Mohammad Barzegar (Persian: محمد برزگر; born July 24, 1976) is an Iranian footballer. He won the 2001–02 Iran Pro League with Persepolis.

== Club Career Statistics ==
Club performance			League		Cup		Continental		Total	
Season	Club	League	Apps	Goals	Apps	Goals	Apps	Goals	Apps	Goals
Iran			League		Hazfi Cup		Asia		Total	
1998–99	Persepolis	Azadegan League	0	0	1	0	–		1	0
1999–00	Persepolis	Azadegan League	16	0	1	0	0	0	17	0
2000–01	Persepolis	Azadegan League	11	1	2	0	2	0	15	1
2001–02	Persepolis	Iran Pro League	12	1	3	0	–		15	1
2002–03	Persepolis	Iran Pro League	13	1			3	0		
2003–04	Persepolis	Iran Pro League	9	0			–			
Total			61	3			5	0	66	3
