= Younes Bahonar =

Iranian footballer

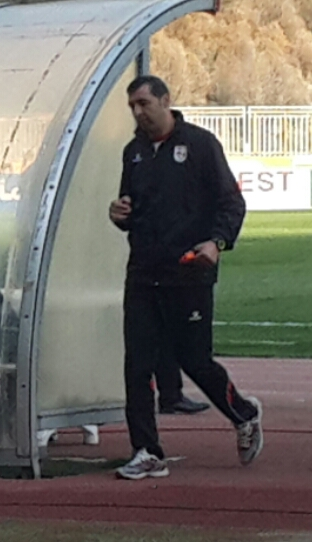

Personal information
- Full name: Younes Bahonar
- Date of birth: April 12, 1977 (age 49)
- Place of birth: Tabriz, Iran
- Position: Defender

Team information
- Current team: Machine Sazi (assistant manager)

Senior career*
Years	Team	Apps	(Gls)
1992–1996	Machine Sazi		
1996–2000	Tractor		
2000–2004	Persepolis	65	(0)
2004–2006	Tractor		
2006–2008	Machine Sazi		
2008–2009	Gostaresh		

International career
1998–2002	Iran	2	(0)

Managerial career
- 2007: Machine Sazi (caretaker)
- 2009–2010: Gostaresh (assistant)
- 2011–2012: Machine Sazi (assistant)
- 2012–2014: Gostaresh (assistant)
- 2014–2015: Tractor (assistant)
- 2015–: Machine Sazi (assistant)
- * Club domestic league appearances and goals

Younes Bahonar (Persian: یونس باهنر, born on April 12, 1977) is a retired Iranian football player. He has played as a defender for Persepolis and the Iran national team. In the later years of his career, he captained three Tabrizi clubs: Tractor, Machine Sazi and Gostaresh.

== Club career ==
In 1991, he joined Tavanir Club at East Azerbaijan Province League and then Basij Tabriz. He finally joined Tabriz number one team Tractor in 1996.

=== Club career statistics ===
Club performance			League		Cup		Continental		Total	
Season	Club	League	Apps	Goals	Apps	Goals	Apps	Goals	Apps	Goals
Iran			League		Hazfi Cup		Asia		Total	
2000–01	Persepolis	Azadegan League	14	0	1	0	4	0	19	0
2001–02	Persepolis	Iran Pro League	19	0	2	0	–	–	21	0
2002–03	Persepolis	Iran Pro League	13	0			3	0		
2003–04	Persepolis	Iran Pro League	19	0			–	–		
Career total			65	0			7	0		

== Honours ==
=== Club ===
Persepolis

- Persian Gulf Pro League (1) : 2001–02
