= Amir Hossein Aslanian =

Iranian footballer (born 1979)

Amir-Hossein Aslanian
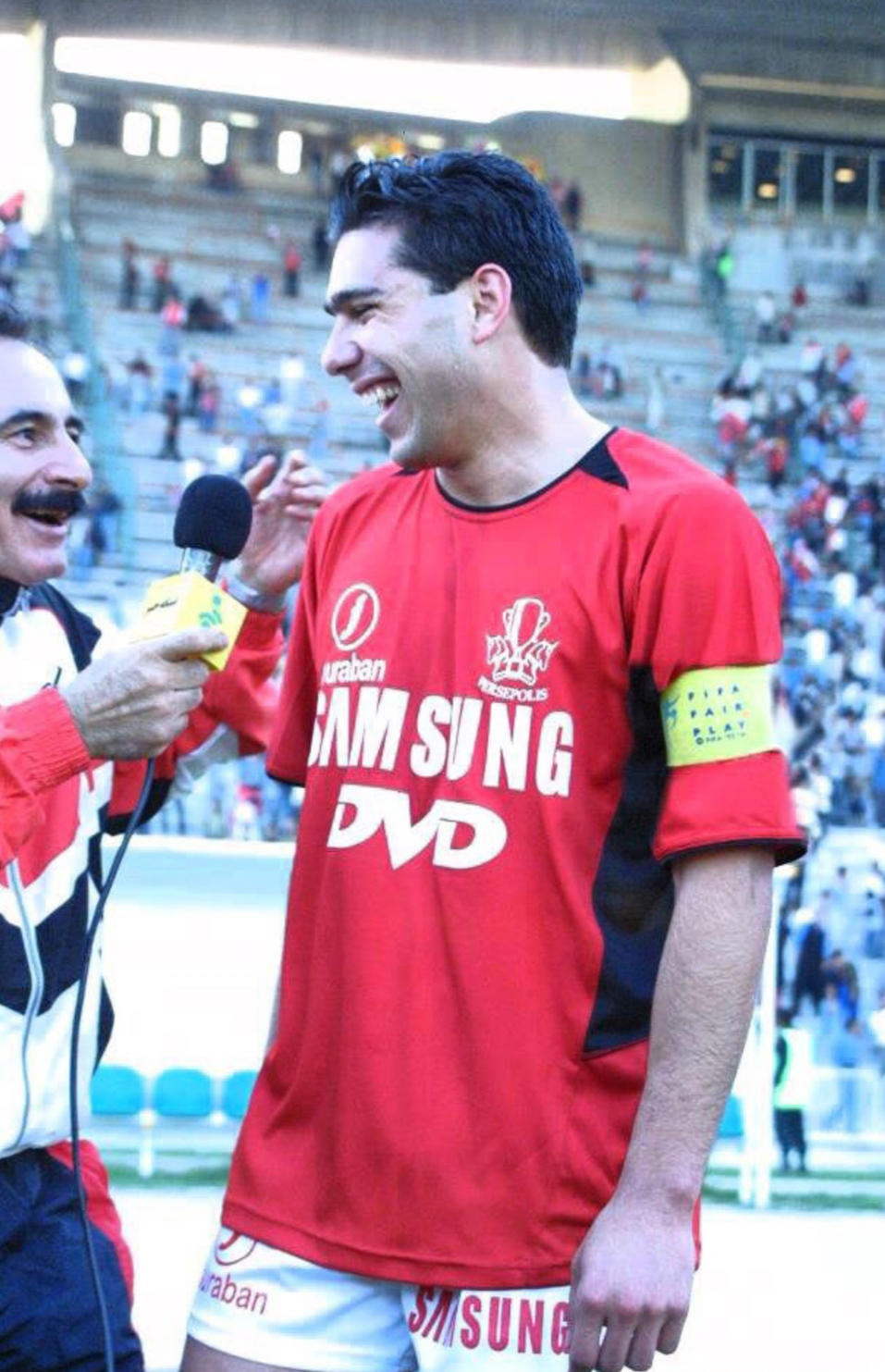

Personal information
- Full name: Amir-Hossein Aslanian
- Date of birth: December 16, 1979 (age 46)
- Place of birth: Tehran, Iran
- Position: Forward

Youth career
- 1997–1999: Nirouye Zamini Tehran

Senior career*
Years	Team	Apps	(Gls)
1999–2000	Nirouye Zamini Tehran	25	(30)
2000–2004	Persepolis Tehran	100	(26)
2006–2007	Paykan Tehran	20	(6)
2007–2008	Damash Tehran	22	(11)
2008–2009	Fujairah FC	25	(15)
Total		187	(93)
- * Club domestic league appearances and goals

Amirhossein Aslanian (Persian: امیرحسین اصلانیان; born December 16, 1979) is a retired Iranian footballer. He is mostly known for his time in Persepolis as a "super-sub". He gained the Top Goalscorer honour at Iranian football 2nd league in 2000. He was invited to the Iranian National Football Team under Jalal Talebi's coaching.

== honors ==
The hero and Mr. Goal of the country's schools with the Tehran team 1996. Mr. Goal of two clubs in the country with the ground team. Two bronze medals in Asia with Persepolis 1999–2000. Azadegan League runner-up with Persepolis. The champion of the first professional league of Iran with Persepolis and Phenideh and the golden reserve of the 2000-2001 league

== Early life ==
Aslanian was born on December 16, 1979, but his birth certificate is dated 1978. His father was a doctor. Aslanian learned karate prior becoming a footballer. He served his conscription at Nirouye Zamini.

== Club career ==
He joined Iranian club Persepolis on a 5-year contract in 2000, under management of Ali Parvin. He played for them until he was fired by then-Coach Vinko Begović in October 2003. In January 2004, he was involved in a fatal car accident and became injured, keeping him off the field for 2 years. He signed with Paykan, but during the match against Bargh Shiraz in 2006 he experienced a heart attack. The next season, he joined Damash Tehran but left them quickly after the club was moved to Gilan province. He usually played as a substitute player at Damash.

=== Club career statistics ===
Club performance			League		Cup		Continental		Total	
Season	Club	League	Apps	Goals	Apps	Goals	Apps	Goals	Apps	Goals
Iran			League		Hazfi Cup		Asia		Total	
1999–00	Niroye Zamini	Division 2	10	2			–			
2000–01	Persepolis	Azadegan League	8	2	1	0	5	0	14	2
2001–02	Persepolis	Pro League	21	3	3	1	–		24	4
2002–03	Persepolis	Pro League	12	1			1	1		
2003–04	Persepolis	Pro League	4	0			–			
2006–07	Paykan	Pro League	9	0	3	0	–		12	0
2007–08	Damash	Division 1	9	0	1	0	–		10	0
Career total			73	8			6	1		

== Honours ==
=== Club ===
Persepolis

- Persian Gulf Pro League (1) : 2001–02
