= Ebrahim Asadi =

Iranian footballer

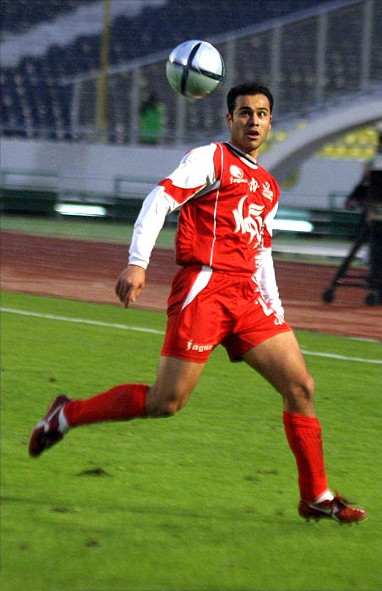

Personal information
- Full name: Ebrahim Asadi
- Date of birth: June 8, 1979 (age 47)
- Place of birth: Tehran, Iran
- Position: Midfielder

Youth career
- Atashneshani
- –2000: Persepolis

Senior career*
Years	Team	Apps	(Gls)
1999–2003	Persepolis	47	(3)
2004	Zob Ahan	1	(0)
2004–2007	Persepolis	65	(2)
2007–2010	Steel Azin	39	(1)
2010	→ Nassaji (loan)	2	(0)
2010–2011	Aboumoslem	3	(0)
2011	Sanat Sari	4	(0)
- * Club domestic league appearances and goals

Ebrahim Asadi (Persian: ابراهیم اسدی, born June 8, 1979) is a retired Iranian footballer who played for Persepolis.

== Club career ==
=== Club career statistics ===
Last Update 18 September 2010

Club performance			League		Cup		Continental		Total	
Season	Club	League	Apps	Goals	Apps	Goals	Apps	Goals	Apps	Goals
Iran			League		Hazfi Cup		Asia		Total	
1999–00	Persepolis	Azadegan League	1	0	2	0	0	0	3	0
2000–01	Persepolis	Azadegan League	9	1	1	0	1	0	11	1
2001–02	Persepolis	Pro League	12	1	1	0	-	-	13	1
2002–03	Persepolis	Pro League	22	1				0		
2003–04	Persepolis	Pro League	3	0			-	-		
2003–04	Zob Ahan	Pro League	1	0			-	-		
2004–05	Persepolis	Pro League	25	2			-	-		
2005–06	Persepolis	Pro League	19	0			-	-		
2006–07	Persepolis	Pro League	21	0			-	-		
2007–08	Steel Azin	First Division	20	0			-	-		
2008–09	Steel Azin	First Division	16	1		1	-	-		
2009–10	Steel Azin	Pro League	3	0	0	0	-	-	3	0
2009–10	Nassaji	First Division	2	0			-	-		
2010–11	Aboumoslem	First Division	3	0			-	-		
2010–11	Sanat Sari	First Division	4	0			-	-		
Career total			161	6						

- Assist Goals

Season	Team	Assists
05-06	Persepolis	2
06-07	Persepolis	2

== Honours ==
=== Club ===
Persepolis

- Iranian Football League (2) : 1999–2000, 2001–02
