= Ebrahim Taghipour =

Iranian footballer

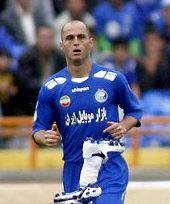
- Taghipour playing for Esteghlal at AFC Champions League

Personal information
- Full name: Ebrahim Taghipour
- Date of birth: September 23, 1976 (age 50)
- Place of birth: Sari, Iran
- Height: 1.96 m (6 ft 5 in)
- Position: Defender

Youth career
- Tractor Sazi

Senior career*
| Years | Team | Apps | (Gls) |
- Zob Ahan
| 2000 | Persepolis | 2 | (0) |
| 2000–2005 | Zob Ahan | | |
| 2005–2006 | Esteghlal Ahvaz | 24 | (1) |
| 2006–2007 | Mes Kerman | 24 | (3) |
| 2007–2008 | Pegah Gilan | 25 | (0) |
| 2008–2009 | Esteghlal | 8 | (0) |
| 2009–2010 | Nassaji Mazandaran | | |
| 2010–2012 | Sanat Sari | | |

International career
| 2003–2004 | Iran | 8 | (2) |
- * Club domestic league appearances and goals as of 21 September 2008

Ebrahim Taghipour (Persian: ابراهیم تقی‌پور; born September 23, 1976 in Sari, Iran) is a retired Iranian football player who previously played for Zob Ahan, Persepolis, Esteghlal and also Iran national football team.

== Honours ==
Zob Ahan

- Iranian Hazfi Cup (1): 2002–03

Esteghlal

- Iran's Premier Football League (1): 2008–09
