= 2000–01 Azadegan League =

10th season of Azadegan League

Azadegan League
- Season: 2000–01
- Champions: Esteghlal (5th Iranian title)
- Asian Club Championship: Esteghlal
- Asian Cup Winners' Cup: Fajr Sepasi
- Matches: 132
- Goals: 357 (2.7 per match)
- Top goalscorer: Reza Sahebi (14 goals)
- Biggest home win: Bargh Shiraz 6–0 Esteghlal Rasht (8 September 2000)
- Biggest away win: Paykan 1–5 Foolad (24 August 2000)
- Highest scoring: Esteghlal 6–1 Esteghlal Rasht (18 August 2000)
- Longest winning run: Esteghlal (6 matches)
- Longest unbeaten run: Esteghlal, Persepolis (17 matches)
- Longest winless run: Sepahan (9 matches)
- Longest losing run: Foolad (5 matches)

The 2000–01 Azadegan League was the tenth and last season of the Azadegan League as top tier of professional football league in Iran. Esteghlal became the champions.

== Overview ==
Esteghlal won the last ever Azadegan League before it became the second division league after the formation of Iran Pro League.

== Teams ==
Team	Location	Stadium	Capacity
Bargh Shiraz	Shiraz	Hafezieh Stadium	20,000
Esteghlal	Tehran	Azadi Stadium	100,000
Esteghlal Rasht	Rasht	Dr. Azodi Stadium	15,000
Fajr Sepasi	Shiraz	Hafezieh Stadium	20,000
Foolad	Ahvaz	Takhti Stadium	30,000
PAS	Tehran	Shahid Dastgerdi Stadium	8,250
Paykan	Tehran	Iran Khodro Stadium	10,000
Persepolis	Tehran	Azadi Stadium	100,000
Saipa	Tehran	Shahid Shiroudi Stadium	25,000
Sepahan	Isfahan	Naghsh-e Jahan Stadium	75,000
Zob Ahan	Isfahan	Foolad Shahr Stadium	20,000

== Final classification ==
Pos	Team	Pld	W	D	L	GF	GA	GD	Pts	Qualification
1	Esteghlal (C)	22	15	5	2	52	21	+31	50	Qualification for the 2001–02 Asian Club Championship
2	Persepolis	22	13	7	2	36	16	+20	46	
3	Saipa	22	8	9	5	29	27	+2	33	
4	Zob Ahan	22	7	9	6	30	22	+8	30	
5	Paykan	22	7	7	8	19	29	−10	28	
6	PAS	22	5	12	5	25	23	+2	27	
7	Sepahan	22	5	11	6	19	23	−4	26	
8	Foolad	22	6	7	9	23	27	−4	25	
9	Fajr Sepasi	22	5	9	8	20	25	−5	24	Qualification for the 2001–02 Asian Cup Winners' Cup
10	Est. Rasht	22	7	3	12	23	43	−20	24	
11	Bargh Shiraz	22	4	9	9	23	26	−3	21	
12	Tractor Sazi	22	5	2	15	18	35	−17	17	

Updated to match(es) played on 1 September 2018. Source: RSSSF
Rules for classification: 1) Points; 2) Goal difference; 3) Goals scored.
(C) Champions

== Statistics ==
=== Top GoalScorers ===
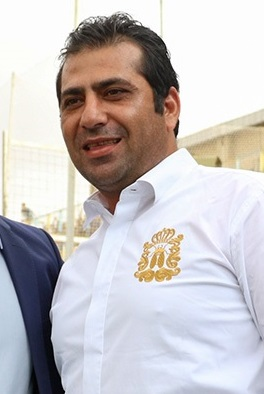
Ali Samereh

Rank	Player	Club	Goals
1	(Iran) Reza Sahebi	Zob Ahan	14
1	(Iran) Ali Samereh	Esteghlal	14
3	(Iran) Reza Ostovari	Zob Ahan	8
3	(Iran) Amir Salamibakhsh	Esteghlal Rasht	8
5	(Iran) Faraz Fatemi	Fajr Sepasi	7
5	(Iran) Behrouz Rahbarifar	Persepolis	7
5	(Iran) Amir Vaziri	Fajr Sepasi	7
8	(Iran) Behnam Abolghasempour	Saipa	6
8	(Iran) Farhad Khangoli	Saipa	6
8	(Iran) Rasoul Khatibi	PAS Tehran	6

=== Hat-tricks ===
Player	For	Against	Result	Date
Ali Samereh	Esteghlal	Peykan	1–4 (A)	4 August 2000
Reza Sahebi	Zob Ahan	Esteghlal Rasht	4–2 (H)	4 August 2000
Farhad Majidi	Esteghlal	Tractor Sazi	1–3 (A)	10 August 2000
Ali Samereh	Esteghlal	Foolad	1–3 (A)	3 December 2000
