= Mashhad derby =

Khorasan derby
- Other names: Razavi Khorasan derby
- Location: Mashhad, Iran
- Teams: Aboumoslem .vs. Payam; Siah Jamegan .vs. Padideh
- First meeting: Aboomoslem 1–2 Payam; Mashhad City League (29 December 1985); Siah Jamegan 1–1 Padideh; 2013–14 Azadegan League (6 October 2013)

Statistics
- Most wins: Aboomoslem v Payam; Official: Aboomoslem: 5 Total: Aboomoslem:9; Siah Jamegan v Padideh; Official: Padideh: 3 Total: Padideh:9

The Mashhad derby (Persian: شهرآورد مشهد), also known as the Razavi Khorasan derby (Persian: شهرآورد خراسان رضوی), is a football local derby match between the four most popular clubs from Mashhad: Aboomoslem, Payam, Siah Jamegan and Padideh. In the 1980s and early 1990s, it was Iran's second most important derby after the Tehran derby. It has lost its status to more popular derbies such as Isfahan derby, Ahvaz derby, Tabriz derby, Gilan derby and Shiraz derby.

== History ==
Historically, the top two football clubs from Mashhad, F.C. Aboomoslem and Payam Khorasan, would face their chief rival in this derby from 1984 until 1989 and later in 1991-1992 when competing in Mashhad Football League and Khorasan Football League. F.C. Aboomoslem was owned by Iran Police Force and Payam Khorasan owned by Ministry of Post and Telecommunications. The derby venue, Takhti Stadium, would fill with respective fans carrying their club's banner color: black—Aboomoslem; green—Payam Mashhad. Aboomoslem's fanbase were generally from Saadabad Square, Sanabad Street and Abkooh. Payam's fanbase were generally from Tabarsi Street.

In the 1990s both sides rotated turns playing in Azadegan League and Second Division. In 2001, they would again face each other in this derby in the playoff round of Division Two for promotion to Azadegan League.

In 2008, both sides would play in Iran's main league Persian Gulf Cup and thus renewed their derby encounters.

== Aboomoslem vs. Payam ==
=== League ===
#	Season	Date	Home team	Score	Away team	Home goalscorer	Away goalscorer	Venue	Attendance
1	1990–91 Iran 2nd Division	7 September 1990	Aboomoslem	1–0	Payam	Hanteh 23' (pen.)	–	Takhti Stadium	4,000
2	1990–91 Iran 2nd Division	16 November 1990	Payam	0–0	Aboomoslem	–	–	Takhti Stadium	2,000
3	1995–96 Iran 2nd Division	4 September 1995	Payam	1–2	Aboomoslem	Sahebi 5'	Nazerzadeh 18', Hanteh 50'	Takhti Stadium	6,000
4	1995–96 Iran 2nd Division	8 December 1995	Aboomoslem	3–1	Payam	Laghab 12', Kochakzadeh 62', Nazerzadeh 85'	Izadi 78'	Takhti Stadium	5,000
5	2000–01 Iran 2nd Division	2 March 2001	Aboomoslem	2–1	Payam	Mokhtari 11', Nazerzadeh 57'	Pakniat 70'	Takhti Stadium	5,000
6	2000–01 Iran 2nd Division	20 April 2001	Payam	1–2	Aboomoslem	Mahdi Hosseini 45'	Garousi 33', 84'	Takhti Stadium	7,000
7	2008–09 Iran Pro League	21 October 2008	Aboomoslem	0–1	Payam	–	Arifi 86' (pen.)	Samen Stadium	5,000
8	2008–09 Iran Pro League	21 February 2009	Payam	1–1	Aboomoslem	Koushki 60'	Agha Mohammadi 12'	Samen Stadium	2,000
9	2014–15 League 2	6 October 2014	Payam	1–1	Aboomoslem	Masoumeeyan 15'	Tohidiyan 60'	Samen Stadium	1,000
10	2014–15 League 2	10 December 2014	Aboomoslem	1–1	Payam	Nouri 60'	Mojarad 90+3'	Samen Stadium	1,000

=== Regional Leagues ===
Khorasan Provincial League matches
Khorasan Pro League
Mashhad City League matches

#	Season	Competition	Date	Home team	Score	Away team	Home goalscorer	Away goalscorer	Venue	Attendance
1	1985–86	Masshad City League	29 December 1985	Aboomoslem	1–2	Payam	Yusefi 42'	Gholam Asghari 28', Hossein Asghari 70'	Takhti Stadium	–
2	1986–87	Masshad City League	17 April 1986	Aboomoslem	1–0	Payam	Seyed Hosseini 35'	–	Takhti Stadium	
3	1986–87	Khorasan Football League	6 June 1986	Aboomoslem	1–1 (Note: Aboomoslem 4–5 Payam on penalties.)	Payam	–	–	Takhti Stadium	
4	1987–88	Khorasan Football League	30 May 1987	Aboomoslem	5–1	Payam	Seyed Hosseini 10', Akbar Azam 15', Mohammad Azam 34', 38', Rezaee 48'	Akhondzadeh 20'	Takhti Stadium	
5	1987–88	Masshad City League	6 June 1986	Aboomoslem	1–0	Payam	Siami 57' (pen.)	–	Takhti Stadium	
6	1988–89	Khorasan Football League	5 July 1988	Aboomoslem	2–1	Payam			Takhti Stadium	
7	1989–90	Khorasan Football League	10 April 1990	Payam	1–0	Aboomoslem	Hosseinipour		Takhti Stadium	
8	1990–91	Khorasan Football League	15 September 1990	Payam	0–0	Aboomoslem	–	–	Takhti Stadium	3,000
9	1990–91	Khorasan Football League	11 December 1990	Aboomoslem	0–0	Payam	–	–	Takhti Stadium	
10	1990–91	Khorasan Football League	17 April 1992	Aboomoslem	0–1	Payam		Sahebi 88'	Takhti Stadium	–
11	1992–93	Khorasan Pro League	30 December 1992	Payam	2–0	Aboomoslem			Takhti Stadium	
12	1992–93	Khorasan Pro League	16 May 1993	Aboomoslem	0–1	Payam			Takhti Stadium	

=== Friendlies ===
#	Date	Home team	Score	Away team	Home goalscorer	Away goalscorer	Venue	Attendance
1	8 September 2008	Payam	1–0	Aboomoslem	Sahimi	–	Samen Stadium	–
2	27 August 2013	Aboomoslem	2–3	Payam	–	Nazemi 15', Baseri 35', Barati 70'	Samen Stadium	–

== Notable derby players ==
Aboomoslem

- Mohammad Azam
- Khodadad Azizi
- Hadi Bargizar
- Hossein Ebadzadeh
- Seyed Kazem Ghiyassian
- Alireza Gil Arab
- Reza Jahedi
- Asghar Jandari
- Saeed Jooshesh
- Akbar Misaghian
- Hossein Omidvar
- Shahriyar Rezaei
- Saeed Sayyami
- Hossein Shamlou
- Saeed Khani
- Shahab Gordan
- Mehdi Sabeti
- Daniel Olerum
- Jean Black Ngody

Payam

- Reza Attarzadeh
- Gholam Asghari
- Hassan Asghari
- Majid Hosseinipour
- Hamid Ghasemzadeh
- Mohsen Nasseri
- Fereydoun Mehryar
- Mohammad Momeni
- Hashem Rahbardar
- Seyed Jafar Sadat
- Reza Sahebi
- Gholam Salari
- Mohammad Tashakkori
- Younes Masoudi
- Hossein Hooshyar
- Sirous Sangchouli
- Mojtaba Sarasiaei
- Shpejtim Arifi
- Diego Benedito Galvão Máximo

== Siah Jamegan vs. Padideh ==
=== League ===
#	Season	Date	Home team	Score	Away team	Home goalscorer	Away goalscorer	Venue	Attendance
1	2013–14 Azadegan League	6 October 2013	Siah Jamegan	1–1	Padideh	Marvi	Tahmasebi	Samen Stadium	
2	2013–14 Azadegan League	18 January 2014	Padideh	1–1	Siah Jamegan	Bagheri	Avakht	Samen Stadium	
3	2015–16 Persian Gulf Pro League	15 September 2015	Siah Jamegan	0–1	Padideh	–	Kheiri 18'	Samen Stadium	
4	2015–16 Persian Gulf Pro League	19 February 2016	Padideh	1–1	Siah Jamegan	Enayati 60'	Nasehi 2'	Samen Stadium	3,400
5	2016–17 Persian Gulf Pro League	31 July 2016	Siah Jamegan	1–1	Padideh	Kalantari 55' (pen.)	Abbasian 81'	Samen Stadium	3,100
6	2016–17 Persian Gulf Pro League	18 January 2017	Padideh	1–1	Siah Jamegan	Asgari 38'	Kamandani 37'	Samen Stadium	1,000
7	2017–18 Persian Gulf Pro League	31 July 2016	Siah Jamegan	0–2	Padideh	–	Khanzadeh 75', Ghazi 90+3'	Samen Stadium	1,000
6	2017–18 Persian Gulf Pro League	18 January 2017	Padideh	2–1	Siah Jamegan	Abbasian 32', Ghazi 40' (pen.)	Shakeri 38'	Imam Reza Stadium	4,000

=== Friendlies ===
#	Season	Home team	Score	Away team	Home goalscorer	Away goalscorer	Venue	Attendance
1	22 January 2015	Siah Jamegan	1–1	Padideh	Marvi 20'	Jovanović 80'	Samen Stadium	
2	12 March 2015	Siah Jamegan	1–3	Padideh		Shakeri, Choupani, Rajabzadeh	Samen Stadium	
3	31 March 2015	Siah Jamegan	2–7	Padideh			Samen Stadium	
4	13 November 2015	Siah Jamegan	0–0	Padideh			Samen Stadium	50
5	6 December 2015	Siah Jamegan	2–3	Padideh			Samen Stadium	
6	27 March 2016	Siah Jamegan	1–1	Padideh	Karimi	Naghizadeh	Samen Stadium	
7	4 May 2016	Siah Jamegan	1–2	Padideh	Zamehran	Yousefi, Badamaki	Samen Stadium	
8	1 September 2016	Siah Jamegan	1–1	Padideh		Moein Abbasian	Samen Stadium	
9	7 October 2016	Siah Jamegan	1–2	Padideh	Zareei	Moein Abbasian, Shakeri	Samen Stadium	
10	19 November 2016	Siah Jamegan	3–0	Padideh	Abbasi, Aliasgari		Samen Stadium	
