= 2010–11 Azadegan League =

20th season of Azadegan League

Azadegan League
- Season: 2010–11
- Champions: Damash; 1st Azadegan League title
- Promoted: Damash; Mes Sarcheshmeh; Moghavemat Shiraz
- Relegated: Payam Mashhad; Foolad Natanz; Esteghlal Ahvaz; Sepidrood
- Matches: 364
- Goals: 737 (2.02 per match)
- Top goalscorer: Afshin Chavoshi; Moslem Firoozabadi; Mostafa Shojaei (18 goals)
- Biggest home win: Gol Gohar 4–0 Mes Rafsanjan (29 October 2010)
- Biggest away win: Hamyari Arak 1–4 Foolad Natanz (8 April 2011)
- Highest scoring: Foolad Natanz 3–5 Naft MIS (2 May 2011)
- Highest attendance: 30,000; Gostaresh – Aboumoslem (9 May 2011)
- Lowest attendance: 0 (spectator ban); Damash Lorestan – Est. Ahvaz (2 December 2010); Naft MIS – Mes Rafsanjanl (6 February 2011); Tarbiat Yazd – Damash (13 February 2011); Tarbiat Yazd – Foolad Natanz (25 February 2011); Tarbiat Yazd – Sh. Bandar Abbas (12 March 2011); Damash – Payam Mashhad (18 March 2011); Est. Ahvaz – Shirin Faraz (2 May 2011); Iranjavan – Sepidrood (9 May 2011)
- Total attendance: 972,900
- Average attendance: 2,733

The 2010–11 Azadegan League was the 20th season of the Azadegan League and tenth as the second highest division since its establishment in 1991. The season featured 19 teams from the 2009–10 Azadegan League, three new teams relegated from the 2009–10 Persian Gulf Cup (Moghavemat Shiraz, Aboumoslem and Esteghlal Ahvaz) and four new teams promoted from the 2009–10 2nd Division (Sepidrood as champions, Naft Masjed Soleyman, Shahrdari Yasouj and Foolad Yazd). Foolad Natanz replaced Sepahan Novin, Machine Sazi replaced Petroshimi Tabriz and Sanat Sari replaced Mehrkam Pars. Shensa Arak changed their name to Hamyari Arak. The league started on 23 September 2010 and ended on 9 May 2011. Damash won the Azadegan League title for the first time in their history. Damash, Mes Sarcheshmeh and Moghavemat Shiraz gained promotion to the Persian Gulf Cup.

== Events ==
Locations of clubs in 2010–11 Azadegan League

=== Start of season ===
- The league was to feature three teams relegated from Persian Gulf Cup in 2009–10; Esteghlal Ahvaz, F.C. Aboomoslem, and Moghavemat Sepasi.
- The League also featured four teams promoted from The 2nd division: Sepidrood Rasht, Naft Masjed Soleyman, Foolad Yazd, and Shahrdari Yasuj.
- Mehrkam Pars, (formerly of Tehran) was bought by the city of Sari in the province of Mazandaran. The new team will be known as Sanat Sari F.C.
- Machine Sazi ended its 2009–10 Iran Football's 2nd Division campaign in 4th place (Group A) and could not promote to the Azadegan League. But They bought Petrochimi licence. So They will play in the Azadegan League 2010–11.
- Shensa Arak was replaced by Hamyari Arak.
- Sepahan Novin was replaced by Foolad Natanz.

== Teams ==
=== Group A ===
Team	City	Venue	Capacity	Head Coach	Past Season
Damash Gilan	Rasht	Sardar Jangal	15,000	(Iran) Mehdi Dinvarzadeh	2nd in Azadegan League/A
Etka	Gorgan	Karim Abad	15,000	(Iran) Hasan Ghezel	6th in Azadegan League/A
Foolad Natanz	Natanz	Safaiye	15,000	(Iran) Hossein Charkhabi	Replaced for Sepahan Novin
Gol Gohar	Sirjan	Imam Ali	2,000	(Iran) Farshad Pious	10th in Azadegan League/B
Hamyari Arak	Arak	Imam Khomeini	15,000	(Iran) Yaghoub Vatani	Replaced for Shensa Arak
Machine Sazi	Tabriz	Bagh Shomal	20,000	(Iran) Ayyob Zolfaghari	Replaced for Petrochimi
Mes Rafsanjan	Rafsanjan	Noushabad	10,000	(Iran) Akbar Zabardast	5th in Azadegan League/A
Moghavemat Sepasi	Shiraz	Hafezieh	20,000	(Iran) Aliasghar Kalantari	16th in Persian Gulf Cup
Naft Masjed Soleyman	Masjed Soleyman	Behnam Mohammadi	10,000	(Iran) Majid Bagherinia	2nd in 2nd Division
Payam Mashhad	Mashhad	Samen	35,000	(Iran) Ramezan Shokrin	8th in Azadegan League/A
Sanati Kaveh	Tehran	Aliaf Stadium	5,000	(Iran) Ahmad Khodadad	9th in Azadegan League/A
Shahrdari Bandar Abbas	Bandar Abbas	Takhti Bandar Abbas	10,000	(Argentina) Carlos Fabian Leeb	7th in Azadegan League/A
Shahrdari Yasuj	Yasuj	Takhti Yasuj	5,000	(Iran) Jamshid Ghadiri	3rd in 2nd Division
Tarbiat Yazd	Yazd	Nassiri	6,000	(Iran) Davoud Mahabadi	3rd in Azadegan League/A

=== Group B ===
Team	City	Venue	Capacity	Head Coach	Past Season
Aboomoslem	Mashhad	Samen Stadium	35,000	(Iran) Ali Hanteh	17th in Persian Gulf Cup
Aluminium Hormozgan	Bandar Abbas	Takhti	10,000	(Croatia) Vinko Begović	4th in Azadegan League/B
Bargh Shiraz	Shiraz	Hafezieh	20,000	(Iran) Mehdi Dinavarzadeh	3rd in Azadegan League/B
Damash Lorestan	Dorood	Takhti	10,000	(Iran) Javad Zarincheh	11th in Azadegan League/A
Esteghlal Ahvaz	Ahvaz	Takhti	15,000	(Iran) Rahim Firouzi	18th in Persian Gulf Cup
Foolad Yazd	Yazd	Nassiri	6,000	(Iran) Edmond Yunanpour	4th in 2nd Division
Gostaresh Foolad	Tabriz	Bagh Shomal	20,000	(Iran) Firouz Karimi	8th in Azadegan League/B
Iranjavan	Bushehr	Shahid Beheshti	15,000	(Iran) Mohammad Abbasi	10th in Azadegan League/A
Mes Sarcheshmeh	Sarcheshmeh	Shahid Zenali	10,000	(Iran) Asghar Sharafi	5th in Azadegan League/B
Nassaji	Qa'em Shahr	Vatani	15,000	(Iran) Golmohammadi	7th in Azadegan League/B
Payam Mokhaberat	Shiraz	Hafezieh	20,000	(Iran) Mohammad Abbasi	12th in Azadegan League/A
Sanat Sari	Sari	Shohada Stadium	15,000	(Iran) Mahmoud Sourtchi	Replaced for Mehrkam Pars
Sepidrood Rasht	Rasht	Dr. Azodi Stadium	11,000	(Iran) Farhad Hosseinpour	1st in 2nd Division
Shirin Faraz	Kermanshah	Azadi Stadium	7,000	(Iran) Majid Aghajari	6th in Azadegan League/B

== Managerial changes ==
Team	Outgoing manager	Manner of departure	Date of vacancy	Position in table	Replaced by	Date of appointment
Damash Gilan	(Slovenia) Marijan Pušnik	Sacked	9 November 2010	14	(Iran) Afshin Nazemi	7 December 2010
Bargh Shiraz	(Iran) Mehdi Dinvarzadeh	Resigned	30 October 2010		(Iran) Alireza Emamifar	30 October 2010
Damash Gilan	(Iran) Afshin Nazemi	End of caretaker spell	7 December 2010		(Iran) Mehdi Dinvarzadeh	7 December 2010
Esteghlal Ahvaz	(Iran) Ali Hanteh	Resigned	December 2010		(Iran) Nader Dastneshan	December 2010
Hamyari Arak	(Iran) Yaghoub Vatani	Sacked	28 December 2010	12	(Iran) Nasser Pourmehdi	28 December 2010
Bargh Shiraz	(Iran) Alireza Emamifar	Sacked	7 January 2011		(Iran) Hossein Hosseinzadeh	8 January 2011
Shirin Faraz	(Iran) Majid Aghajeri	Sacked	17 January 2011	14	(Iran) Hadi Bargizar	21 January 2011
Iranjavan	(Iran) Asghar Sharafi	Resigned	22 January 2011	3	(Iran) Mohammad Abbasi	23 January 2011
Payam Mokhaberat	(Iran) Mohammad Abbasi	Resigned	22 January 2011	12	(Iran) Asghar Akbari	2011
Sanati Kaveh	(Iran) Javad Zarincheh	Mutual consent	February 2011	3	(Iran) Farhad Kazemi	11 February 2011
Damash	(Serbia) Darko Dražić	Sacked	13 February 2011	12	(Iran) Javad Zarincheh	14 February 2011
Naft	(Iran) Majid Bagherinia	Resigned	15 February 2011	8	(Iran) Siamak Bakhtiarizadeh	15 February 2011
Payam Mashhad	(Iran) Abbas Chamanyan	Mutual consent	20 February 2011	11	(Iran) Ramezan Shokrin	20 February 2011
Aboomoslem	(Iran) Ghiyassian	Resigned	February 2011	3	(Iran) Ali Hanteh	20 February 2011
Shirin Faraz	(Iran) Hadi Bargizar	Resigned	6 March 2011	8	(Iran) Reza Mohajeri	7 March 2011
Tarbiat	(Iran) Davoud Mahabadi	Resigned	7 March 2011	10	(Iran) Hadi Bargizar	7 March 2011
Sanati Kaveh	(Iran) Farhad Kazemi	Resigned	7 March 2011	5	(Iran) Ali Nikbakht	10 March 2011
Esteghlal Ahvaz	(Iran) Afshin Komaei	Sacked	8 May 2011	11	(Iran) Bahman Roshanaei	8 May 2011

== Standings ==
=== Group A ===
Pos	Team	Pld	W	D	L	GF	GA	GD	Pts	Promotion or relegation
1	Damash	26	13	9	4	39	24	+15	48	Promotion to 2011–12 Persian Gulf Cup
2	Moghavemat	26	12	5	9	24	18	+6	41	Azadegan League 2010–11 Play Off
3	Sh. Yasouj	26	11	6	9	28	26	+2	39	
4	Naft Masjed Soleyman	26	8	11	7	33	32	+1	35	
5	Sh. Bandar Abbas	26	9	8	9	26	26	0	35	
6	Etka Gorgan	26	9	7	10	30	28	+2	34	
7	Gol Gohar	26	8	10	8	29	27	+2	34	
8	Tarbiat Yazd	26	6	15	5	24	22	+2	33	
9	Mes Rafsanjan	26	8	8	10	20	25	−5	32	
10	Hamyari Arak	26	8	8	10	20	28	−8	32	
11	Sanati Kaveh	26	7	10	9	27	32	−5	31	
12	Machine Sazi	26	7	10	9	30	36	−6	31	
13	Payam Mashhad (R)	26	9	5	12	30	30	0	29 (Note: Payam Mashhad had 3 points deducted.)	Relegation to 2011–12 Iran Football's 2nd Division
14	Foolad Natanz (R)	26	6	10	10	30	36	−6	28	Relegation to 2011–12 Iran Football's 2nd Division

Updated to match(es) played on 10 May 2011. Source: Persian League
Rules for classification: 1) points; 2) goal difference; 3) number of goals scored.
(R) Relegated

=== Group B ===
Pos	Team	Pld	W	D	L	GF	GA	GD	Pts	Promotion or relegation
1	Mes Sarcheshmeh	26	14	6	6	34	14	+20	48	Promotion to 2011–12 Persian Gulf Cup
2	Aluminium Hormozgan	26	13	9	4	29	19	+10	48	Azadegan League 2010–11 Play Off
3	Gostaresh	26	14	6	6	28	22	+6	48	
4	Nassaji Mazandaran	26	11	9	6	34	17	+17	42	
5	Aboumoslem	26	11	9	6	28	20	+8	42	
6	Shirin Faraz	26	8	11	7	17	19	−2	35	
7	Sanat Sari	26	8	11	7	18	24	−6	35	
8	Iranjavan	26	8	9	9	29	26	+3	33	
9	Bargh Shiraz	26	7	11	8	24	25	−1	32	
10	Payam Mokhaberat	26	5	12	9	20	22	−2	27	
11	Foolad Yazd	26	7	6	13	23	38	−15	27	
12	Damash Lorestan	26	6	7	13	22	29	−7	25	
13	Est. Ahvaz (R)	26	6	6	14	20	33	−13	24	Relegation to 2011–12 Iran Football's 2nd Division
14	Sepidrood (R)	26	4	8	14	21	39	−18	20	Relegation to 2011–12 Iran Football's 2nd Division

Updated to match(es) played on 10 May 2011. Source: Persian League
Rules for classification: 1) points; 2) goal difference; 3) number of goals scored.
(R) Relegated

== Results table ==
=== Group A ===
Home \ Away	DMG	ETK	FNA	GOL	HAM	MST	MSR	MVT	NFT	PYM	KAV	SHB	SHY	TAR
Damash		1–0	1–1	2–1	2–0	1–1	4–1	3–2	3–1	3–0	3–1	1–0	4–3	1–1
Etka Gorgan	1–0		3–1	1–0	4–1	1–1	1–1	1–2	2–1	1–0	1–0	3–1	0–0	3–0
Foolad Natanz	1–1	0–0		1–2	2–0	1–1	0–0	0–0	3–5	1–2	1–0	1–1	1–0	2–1
Gol Gohar	0–0	1–0	4–1		1–2	0–1	4–0	1–0	1–1	3–3	1–1	1–0	1–0	1–1
Hamyari Arak	1–2	2–1	1–4	0–0		1–1	1–0	1–0	0–1	1–0	2–1	0–0	1–2	0–0
Machine Sazi	2–3	3–2	2–2	1–1	1–1		1–2	1–1	2–2	1–0	1–2	1–2	1–0	2–0
Mes Rafsanjan	2–0	0–0	2–1	2–0	0–1	1–0		1–2	1–0	0–2	4–0	0–0	1–0	0–0
Moghavemat	0–1	1–0	1–0	2–0	0–1	1–0	2–1		1–0	1–0	0–0	1–0	1–1	3–0
Naft Masjed Soleyman	2–2	3–1	2–1	1–1	2–1	3–1	0–0	1–0		3–3	1–2	1–0	0–0	0–0
Payam Mashhad	1–0	3–0	0–1	0–2	1–1	0–1	2–0	2–1	2–0		2–1	1–1	2–0	0–0
Sanati Kaveh	1–1	2–1	1–1	2–2	2–1	0–1	1–1	0–0	0–0	1–0		0–1	3–0	1–1
Sh. Bandar Abbas	1–0	2–2	4–3	0–0	1–0	3–0	2–0	0–1	1–1	2–1	1–3		2–1	1–1
Sh. Yasouj	0–0	1–0	2–0	2–0	0–0	3–0	1–0	2–1	3–1	2–1	2–2	1–0		2–1
Tarbiat Yazd	0–0	1–1	0–0	3–1	0–0	2–2	0–0	1–0	1–0	2–1	3–0	2–0	3–0	

Updated to match(es) played on 10 May 2011. Source: Lig 1.ir/
Legend: Blue = home team win; Yellow = draw; Red = away team win.

=== Group B ===
Home \ Away	ABU	ALH	BGH	DAM	ESA	FOY	GOS	IRJ	MSA	NSJ	PMS	SAN	SEP	SFZ
Aboumoslem		0–0	1–1	1–0	1–0	3–1	3–0	1–0	1–0	1–0	1–0	1–1	3–0	1–2
Aluminium Hormozgan	1–0		2–0	1–1	1–0	2–1	1–2	2–1	1–0	1–0	1–0	0–0	3–0	1–0
Bargh Shiraz	2–1	0–1		0–0	4–1	2–0	0–1	1–0	0–0	1–0	0–2	1–0	1–1	0–0
Damash Lorestan	0–0	2–1	2–1		0–1	2–3	0–0	0–1	0–2	2–1	1–0	3–0	2–1	0–1
Est. Ahvaz	1–2	2–2	2–3	3–2		0–1	1–0	2–1	1–3	0–0	0–3	0–1	2–1	0–1
Foolad Yazd	1–0	1–1	1–1	0–0	1–0		1–2	1–1	1–0	0–2	1–2	1–2	2–0	0–1
Gostaresh	1–0	2–1	2–1	2–1	2–1	2–1		0–1	0–0	1–1	1–0	3–1	1–0	1–1
Iranjavan	1–2	4–0	1–1	2–2	0–0	4–1	0–0		1–0	0–1	1–1	0–0	3–0	2–2
Mes Sarcheshmeh	1–1	1–1	1–1	2–1	1–0	0–1	1–0	3–0		3–0	1–0	4–0	2–0	2–0
Nassaji Mazandaran	3–0	1–1	1–1	2–0	1–1	4–1	0–0	3–0	1–1		4–0	1–0	3–0	2–0
Payam Mokhaberat	1–1	0–0	0–0	1–1	0–0	3–1	1–2	0–0	0–1	1–1		0–1	0–0	0–0
Sanat Sari	2–2	1–1	1–0	1–0	1–0	0–0	2–1	0–2	1–2	1–0	1–1		0–0	0–0
Sepidrood	1–1	0–1	3–1	1–0	1–1	4–1	0–1	3–2	0–2	1–2	2–2	1–1		0–0
Shirin Faraz	0–0	0–2	1–1	1–0	0–1	0–0	3–1	0–1	2–1	0–0	0–2	0–0	2–1	

Updated to match(es) played on 10 May 2011. Source: Lig 1.ir/
Legend: Blue = home team win; Yellow = draw; Red = away team win.

== Play Off ==
First leg to be played 18 May 2011; return leg to be played 24 May 2011

Team 1	Agg.	Team 2	1st leg	2nd leg
Moghavemat Sepasi	6–0	Aluminium Hormozgan	2–0	0–4

=== First leg ===
18 May 2011
17:00

Moghavemat Sepasi	2–0	Aluminium Hormozgan
Pour Mohammad 37'; Shojaiyan 74'

Hafezieh, Shiraz
Attendance: 20000
Referee: Mohsen Torki

=== Return leg ===
24 May 2011
17:00

Aluminium Hormozgan	0–4	Moghavemat Sepasi
		Pour Mohammad 30', 50'; Shojaiyan 73'; Kalantari 77'

Takhti, Bandar Abbas
Attendance: 12000
Referee: Mohsen Ghahremani

== Final ==
Team 1	Score	Team 2
Damash	(w/o)^{1}	Mes Sarcheshmeh

1 Scheduled between Mes Sarcheshmeh and Damash, however, Mes Sarcheshmeh did not show up, Damash awarded championship.

== Player statistics ==
=== Top scorers, Group A ===
Rank	Scorer	Club	Goals
1	(Iran) Mostafa Shojaei	Foolad Natanz	13
1	(Iran) Moslem Firoozabadi	Gol Gohar	13
1	(Iran) Afshin Chavoshi	Damash Gilan	13
2	(Iran) Ahmad Paasi	Mashin Sazi	10
3	(Iran) Amir Khalifeasl	Shahr. Bandar Abbas	9
4	(Iran) Hakim Nasari	Naft Masjed Soleyman	8
4	(Iran) Ghasem Akbari	Etka Gorgan	8

=== Top scorers, Group B ===
Rank	Player	Club	Goals
1	(Mali) Founéké Sy	Iranjavan	9
1	(Iran) Eshagh Sobhani	Mes Sarcheshmeh	9
1	(Iran) Jafar Bazri	Foolad Yazd	9
2	(Iran) Arash Roshanipour	Aboomoslem	7
2	(Iran) Milad Pour Safshekan	Sepidrood Rasht	7
2	(Iran) Hassan Faraji	Payam Mokhaberat	7
3	(Iran) Fereydoon Fazli	Gostaresh/Esteghlal Az	6
3	(Iran) Arash Daneshian	Aboomoslem	6

== Attendances ==
=== Average home attendances ===
Pos	Team	Total	High	Low	Average	Change
1	Nassaji	166,000	15,000	1,000	12,769	+7.9%
2	Naft MIS	108,000	10,000	0	9,000	n/a
3	Sh. Yasouj	72,000	10,000	1,000	5,538	n/a
4	Gostaresh	64,800	30,000	300	4,985	+285.8%
5	Tarbiat Yazd	42,500	10,000	0	4,250	−27.7%
6	Sanat Sari	54,000	10,000	1,000	4,154	n/a
7	Damash Lorestan	41,100	7,000	0	3,425	−42.8%
8	Aluminium Hormozgan	39,500	8,000	1,000	3,038	+54.8%
9	Foolad Yazd	35,000	10,000	1,000	2,692	n/a
10	Damash	32,000	7,000	0	2,667	−17.5%
11	Shirin Faraz	34,000	5,000	1,000	2,615	−21.8%
12	Mes Rafsanjan	33,500	5,000	1,000	2,577	+60.3%
13	Gol Gohar	29,500	3,000	1,500	2,269	+29.7%
14	Moghavemat	27,800	10,000	300	2,138	−70.4%
15	Iranjavan	23,300	3,000	0	1,942	+3.4%
16	Sh. Bandar Abbas	23,500	4,000	1,000	1,808	−10.4%
17	Est. Ahvaz	21,600	7,000	0	1,800	−64.4%
18	Hamyari Arak	18,700	3,000	500	1,438	−59.4%
19	Aboumoslem	17,550	4,000	50	1,350	−77.3%
20	Etka Gorgan	16,950	8,000	50	1,304	−35.3%
21	Bargh Shiraz	15,000	2,000	500	1,154	−72.2%
22	Foolad Natanz	12,000	3,000	200	923	n/a
23	Sepidrood	11,300	3,000	100	869	n/a
24	Machine Sazi	10,300	5,000	100	792	n/a
25	Mes Sarcheshmeh	9,000	2,000	100	692	0.0%
26	Payam Mokhaberat	6,000	1,000	100	462	−49.9%
27	Payam Mashhad	5,550	1,000	50	427	0.0%
28	Sanati Kaveh	2,450	500	50	188	−7.8%
	League total	972,900	30,000	0	2,733	−2.3%

Updated to games played on 9 May 2011
Source: iplstats.com
Notes:
Matches with spectator bans are not included in average attendances
Aboumoslem, Esteghlal Ahvaz and Moghavemat Shiraz played last season in Persian Gulf Cup
Foolad Yazd, Naft MIS, Sepidrood and Shahrdari Yasouj played last season in Iran 2nd Division
Foolad Natanz replaced Sepahan Novin
Machine Sazi replaced Petroshimi Tabriz
Sanat Sari replaced Mehrkam Pars
Shensa Arak changed their name into Hamyari Arak

=== Highest attendances ===
Rank	Home team	Score	Away team	Attendance	Date	Week	Stadium
1	Gostaresh	1–0	Aboumoslem	30,000	9 May 2011	26	Sahand
2	Nassaji	3–0	Aboumoslem	15,000	23 September 2010	1	Vatani
2	Nassaji	0–0	Gostaresh	15,000	29 October 2010	3	Vatani
2	Nassaji	4–1	Foolad Yazd	15,000	5 November 2010	4	Vatani
2	Nassaji	2–0	Shirin Faraz	15,000	19 November 2010	6	Vatani
2	Nassaji	1–0	Sanat Sari	15,000	2 December 2010	8	Vatani
2	Nassaji	1–1	Esteghlal Ahvaz	15,000	24 December 2010	10	Vatani
2	Nassaji	3–0	Sepidrood	15,000	7 January 2011	12	Vatani
2	Nassaji	1–1	Bargh Shiraz	15,000	11 March 2011	20	Vatani
2	Nassaji	2–0	Mes Sarcheshmeh	15,000	8 April 2011	22	Vatani

Notes:
Updated to games played on 9 May 2011. Source: iplstats.com

== See also ==
- 2010–11 Persian Gulf Cup
- 2010–11 Iran Football's 2nd Division
- 2010–11 Iran Football's 3rd Division
- 2010–11 Hazfi Cup
- Iranian Super Cup
- 2010–11 Iranian Futsal Super League
