= 2008–09 Persian Gulf Cup =

8th season of Persian Gulf Pro League

Persian Gulf Cup
- Season: 2008–09
- Champions: Esteghlal; 2nd Pro League title 7th Iranian title
- Relegated: Payam; Damash; Bargh Shiraz
- Champions League: Esteghlal; Zob Ahan; Mes Kerman; Sepahan
- Matches: 306
- Goals: 777 (2.54 per match)
- Top goalscorer: Arash Borhani (21 goals)
- Biggest home win: Esteghlal 6–0 Est. Ahvaz (18 September 2008)
- Biggest away win: Rah Ahan 1–5 Esteghlal (4 February 2009)
- Highest scoring: Zob Ahan 6–3 Saipa (3 October 2008)
- Longest winning run: 6 matches Mes Kerman
- Longest unbeaten run: 13 matches Mes Kerman
- Longest winless run: 27 matches Bargh Shiraz
- Longest losing run: 3 matches Bargh Shiraz
- Highest attendance: 90,000; Persepolis – Damash (25 September 2008); Persepolis – Esteghlal (3 October 2008); Esteghlal – Persepolis (13 February 2009)
- Lowest attendance: 0 (spectator ban); Persepolis – PAS Hamedan (9 August 2008)
- Total attendance: 2,731,000
- Average attendance: 8,954

The 2008–09 Persian Gulf Cup (also known as Iran Pro League) was the 26th season of Iran's Football League and eighth season of Iran Pro League since its establishment in 2001. Persepolis were the defending champions. The season featured 15 teams from the 2007–08 Persian Gulf Cup and two new teams promoted from the 2007–08 Azadegan League: Payam Mashhad as champions and Foolad. Damash replaced Pegah. The league started on 4 August 2008 and ended on 26 April 2009. Esteghlal won the Pro League title for the second time in their history (total seventh Iranian title).

== Teams ==
Team	City	Venue	Capacity	Head coach	Team captain	Past Season
Aboomoslem	Mashhad	Samen	35,000	(Iran) Ali Hanteh	(Iran) Saeed Khani	4th
Bargh Shiraz	Shiraz	Hafezieh	20,000	(Iran) Rasoul Korbekandi	(Iran) Sattar Zare	7th
Damash Gilan	Rasht	Sardar Jangal	15,000	(Croatia) Stanko Poklepović	(Iran) Mohammad Reza Mahdavi	15th
Est. Ahvaz	Ahvaz	Takhti Ahvaz	30,000	(Iran) Khodadad Azizi	(Iran) Afshin Komaei	8th
Esteghlal	Tehran	Azadi	90,000	(Iran) Amir Ghalenoei	(Iran) Farhad Majidi	13th
Foolad	Ahvaz	Takhti Ahvaz	15,000	(Iran) Majid Jalali	(Iran) Ali Badavi	Qualifier
Malavan	Anzali	Takhti Anzali	8,000	(Iran) Mohammad Ahmadzadeh	(Iran) Masoud Gholamalizad	16th
Mes Kerman	Kerman	Shahid Bahonar	15,000	(Iran) Parviz Mazloomi	(Iran) Farzad Hosseinkhani	10th
Moghavemat	Shiraz	Hafezieh	20,000	(Iran) Gholam Hossein Peyrovani	(Iran) Mostafa Sabri	14th
Pas Hamedan	Hamedan	Ghods	5,000	(Croatia) Vinko Begovic	(Iran) Omid Khouraj	5th
Paykan	Qazvin	Shahid Rajaei	5,000	(Iran) Ali Asghar Modir Roosta	(Iran) Mohammad Reza Tahmasebi	9th
Payam	Mashhad	Samen	35,000	(Iran) Kazem Ghiyasiyan	(Iran) Mehdi Hasheminasab	Qualifier
Persepolis	Tehran	Azadi	90,000	(Portugal) Nelo Vingada	(Iran) Karim Bagheri	Champion
Rah Ahan	Rey, Iran	Rah Ahan	15,000	(Iran) Mehdi Tartar	(Iran) Ahmad Taghavi	12th
Saba Qom	Qom	Yadegar Emam	15,000	(Iran) Firouz Karimi	(Iran) Yahya Golmohammadi	3rd
Saipa	Karaj	Enghelab Karaj	15,000	(Iran) Mohammad Mayeli Kohan	(Iran) Ebrahim Sadeghi	11th
Sepahan	Esfahan	Foolad Shahr	25,000	(Iran) Farhad Kazemi	(Iran) Moharram Navidkia	2nd
Zob Ahan	Esfahan	Foolad Shahr	25,000	(Iran) Mansour Ebrahimzadeh	(Iran) Mohammad Salsali	6th

- In October 2008 Pegah Gilan terminated their sports activities due to financial problems. Damash Iranian (Damash Mineral Water Company) owned by Amir Abedini took over their license. New club named Damash Gilan.

Below is the list of coaches who left their teams after the start of the season.

Team	Name	Nationality
Aboomoslem	Hadi Bargizar	(Iran)
Damash Gilan	Bijan Zolfagharnasab	(Iran)
Rah Ahan	Davoud Mahabadi	(Iran)
Saipa	Pierre Littbarski	(Germany)
Sepahan	Engin Firat	(Turkey) (Germany)
Persepolis	Afshin Ghotbi	(Iran) (United States)
Payam	Khodadad Azizi	(Iran)
Aboomoslem	Amir Hossein Peyrovani	(Iran)
Sepahan	Hossein Charkhabi	(Iran)
Damash Gilan	Hossein Abdi	(Iran)
Bargh Shiraz	Mohammad Abbasi	(Iran)
Payam	Abbas Chamanyan	(Iran)
Persepolis	Afshin Peyrovani	(Iran)
Est. Ahvaz	Akbar Misaghian	(Iran)
Bargh Shiraz	Farshad Pious	(Iran)
Payam	Majid Hosseinipour	(Iran)
Rah Ahan	Mahmoud Yavari	(Iran)
Paykan	Ali Asghar Modir Roosta	(Iran)
Aboomoslem	Ali Hanteh	(Iran)

== Foreign players ==
Club	Player 1	Player 2	Player 3	Player 4	Former Players
Aboomoslem	(Cameroon) Jean Black Ngody	(Nigeria) Daniel Olerum	(Togo) Abdou Moumouni	(Togo) Franck Atsou	(Iraq) Jassim Ghulam (Serbia) Fuad Salihović
Bargh Shiraz	(Bosnia and Herzegovina) Alen Avdić	(Brazil) William Teixera			(Uruguay) Martín Barlocco
Damash Gilan	(Brazil) Adriano Alves	(Serbia) Ivan Dragičević			
Esteghlal Ahvaz	(Iraq) Ahmed Kadhim	(Iraq) Mohammed Nasser	(North Macedonia) Marjan Belčev		(Iraq) Haitham Khadim Taher
Esteghlal	(Brazil) Januário	(Peru) Rinaldo Cruzado			(Brazil) Fabrício Ceará
Foolad					
Malavan	(Bosnia and Herzegovina) Alen Bašić	(Brazil) Felipe Alves			
Mes Kerman	(Brazil) Edinho	(Brazil) Paulo Zaltron	(Mali) Sékou Fofana		
Moghavemat					
PAS Hamedan	(Uzbekistan) Shakhboz Erkinov				(Croatia) Mario Garba
Paykan	(Brazil) Christian Carvalho				
Payam	(Brazil) Diego	(Germany) Shpejtim Arifi			
Persepolis	(Brazil) Wésley Brasilia	(Senegal) Ibrahima Touré	(Serbia) Ivan Petrović		(Brazil) Paulão
Rah Ahan	(Uruguay) Álvaro Pintos				(Armenia) Hamlet Mkhitaryan (Uruguay) César Pellegrín
Saba Qom	(Bosnia and Herzegovina) Almir Tolja				
Saipa	(Mali) Alou Traoré	(Mali) Issa Traoré			
Sepahan	(Cameroon) Jacques Elong Elong	(Iraq) Abdul-Wahab Abu Al-Hail	(Iraq) Emad Mohammed	(Mozambique) Armando Sá	
Zob Ahan	(Brazil) Igor Castro	(Iraq) Iman Shirazi	(Kosovo) Bajram Nebihi	(Senegal) Issa Ndoye	(Iraq) Haider Obeid

== League standings ==
Pos	Team	Pld	W	D	L	GF	GA	GD	Pts	Qualification or relegation
1	Esteghlal (C)	34	19	9	6	70	34	+36	66	Qualification for the 2010 AFC Champions League
2	Zob Ahan	34	19	9	6	58	42	+16	66	Qualification for the 2010 AFC Champions League
3	Mes	34	17	10	7	54	36	+18	61	Qualification for the 2010 AFC Champions League
4	Sepahan	34	14	14	6	46	34	+12	56	Qualification for the 2010 AFC Champions League
5	Persepolis	34	15	10	9	50	41	+9	55	
6	Saba	34	12	17	5	49	36	+13	53	
7	Foolad	34	13	11	10	50	41	+9	50	
8	Paykan	34	13	8	13	43	42	+1	47	
9	Fajr	34	11	11	12	33	37	−4	44	
10	Saipa	34	10	12	12	43	50	−7	42	
11	Rah Ahan	34	11	8	15	35	41	−6	41	
12	Pas Hamedan	34	10	10	14	40	47	−7	40	
13	Malavan	34	9	13	12	31	43	−12	40	
14	Est. Ahvaz	34	11	6	17	37	54	−17	39	
15	Aboumoslem	34	8	11	15	34	41	−7	35	
16	Payam (R)	34	9	8	17	33	52	−19	35	Relegation to the 2009–10 Azadegan League
17	Damash (R)	34	6	13	15	40	56	−16	31	Relegation to the 2009–10 Azadegan League
18	Bargh (R)	34	5	9	20	35	54	−19	24	Relegation to the 2009–10 Azadegan League

Updated to match(es) played on 1 September 2018. Source: IPL Stats, Soccerway
Rules for classification: 1) Points; 2) Goal difference; 3) Goals scored.
(C) Champions; (R) Relegated

== Results table ==
Last updated April 26, 2009

Home \ Away	ABU	BGH	EST	ESA	MLV	MES	PAS	PAY	PYM	DMG	PRS	RAH	SAB	SAP	SEP	FOL	MVT	ZOB
Aboumoslem		1–1	0–2	0–1	2–2	1–1	2–1	1–0	1–1	3–2	4–3	0–0	1–0	0–0	1–2	1–2	1–2	4–0
Bargh Shiraz	2–2		1–4	0–3	3–0	4–1	2–0	1–2	0–1	1–1	1–1	0–1	1–2	1–2	1–1	1–1	1–2	1–2
Esteghlal	2–0	1–1		6–0	3–0	2–1	1–0	3–2	5–0	4–2	1–1	2–1	2–1	1–1	1–1	0–1	5–2	2–0
Est. Ahvaz	1–3	1–0	0–3		3–0	1–0	0–0	2–3	1–0	1–1	2–1	1–1	1–1	3–1	1–3	0–1	1–1	0–2
Malavan	0–0	1–0	2–2	1–0		1–0	2–1	1–1	0–1	1–1	2–2	0–1	1–1	2–2	1–1	3–0	1–0	1–1
Mes Kerman	3–1	2–1	1–0	4–0	1–0		2–0	4–0	3–3	1–0	1–1	2–1	3–1	1–1	2–1	3–2	2–0	2–2
PAS Hamedan	2–1	1–0	2–4	5–1	0–0	1–1		2–0	1–0	3–3	0–3	1–0	0–0	2–1	0–0	0–0	1–1	2–2
Paykan	2–0	1–0	1–1	1–0	3–1	1–1	1–0		2–0	2–0	2–2	0–1	0–1	0–2	0–1	0–1	2–2	1–2
Payam Mashhad	1–0	1–2	0–1	2–1	2–0	1–2	1–4	1–1		3–2	1–2	2–1	1–1	1–3	2–2	1–2	0–1	1–3
Damash	1–0	3–1	1–0	2–4	1–2	2–2	1–0	1–0	1–1		1–2	2–2	1–2	1–1	1–1	0–1	1–1	2–1
Persepolis	1–0	3–1	1–1	1–0	0–2	0–1	3–1	2–1	1–0	2–0		2–0	2–2	1–1	3–2	1–0	1–2	2–2
Rah Ahan	3–0	3–0	1–5	2–2	1–0	0–1	2–1	1–4	0–0	1–0	1–2		1–1	1–2	0–1	2–1	0–0	0–1
Saba Qom	1–0	2–2	3–1	2–0	3–0	1–3	3–1	1–1	0–0	2–2	2–0	1–1		2–0	1–1	1–1	2–0	0–0
Saipa	0–0	2–2	0–2	3–2	2–1	1–1	1–3	0–1	1–2	4–1	0–1	1–0	2–4		1–1	3–2	0–2	1–0
Sepahan	2–1	1–0	2–1	2–1	0–0	1–0	2–2	2–4	3–2	1–1	0–0	2–0	2–0	2–0		2–0	0–0	1–2
Foolad	0–0	3–1	0–0	0–2	0–1	2–2	5–1	2–2	3–0	3–0	3–2	2–3	2–2	1–1	2–2		0–1	4–1
Moghavemat	0–0	0–1	4–1	1–0	2–2	2–0	0–1	1–2	0–1	1–1	1–0	1–3	1–1	0–0	1–0	0–1		0–2
Zob Ahan	0–3	2–1	1–1	1–1	3–0	1–0	2–1	2–0	2–0	2–1	3–1	1–0	2–2	6–3	2–1	2–2	3–1	

Source: http://www.iplstats.com/
Legend: Blue = home team win; Yellow = draw; Red = away team win.

== Player statistics ==
=== Top scorers ===
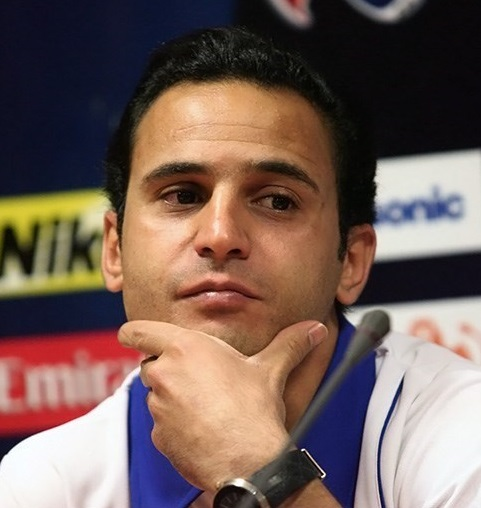
Arash Borhani

Position	Player	Club	Goals
1	(Iran) Arash Borhani	Esteghlal	20
2	(Germany) Shpejtim Arifi	Payam	18
3	(Brazil) Igor Castro	Zob Ahan	16
4	(Iran) Afshin Chavoshi	Damash Gilan	15
5	(Iran) Fereydoon Fazli	Saba Qom	14
5	(Iraq) Emad Mohammed	Sepahan	14
6	(Iran) Siavash Akbarpour	Esteghlal	12
6	(Brazil) Adriano Alvez	Damash Gilan	12
6	(Iran) Davoud Haghi	Rah Ahan	12
8	(Iran) Maysam Baou	Aboomoslem	11
8	(Iran) Faraz Fatemi	Mes Kerman	11
8	(Iran) Iman Haydari	Paykan	11
8	(Iran) Jalal Rafkhaei	Malavan	11
8	(Senegal) Ibrahima Touré	Persepolis	11
11	(Iran) Farid Abedi	Bargh Shiraz	10
11	(Brazil) Edinho	Mes Kerman	10
11	(Iran) Mohammad Reza Khalatbari	Zob Ahan	10
11	(Iran) Amin Motevaselzadeh	Moghavemat Sepasi	10
11	(Mali) Issa Traoré	Saipa	10
20	5 players		9
25	6 players		8
31	2 players		7
33	8 players		6
41	18 players		5
58	23 players		4
81	18 players		3
99	26 players		2
125	95 players		1
Own goals			0
Total goals			777

Last updated: 11 April 2009
Source: Iplstats.com

=== Cards ===
Player	Yellow card	Yellow card Red card	Red card	Team
(Iran) Mohammad Matouri	10	0	1	Payam Mashhad
(Iran) Mohammad Reza Khalatbari	10	1	0	Zob Ahan
(Iran) Mohsen Arzani	8	1	0	Payam Mashhad
(Iran) Alireza Jalili	9	0	0	Payam Mashhad
(Iran) Morteza Bargizar	9	0	0	Payam Mashhad
(Iran) Mohammad AghaMohammadi	9	0	0	Est. Ahvaz
(Iran) Meysam Khosravi	9	0	0	Paykan
(Brazil) Adriano Alvez	9	0	0	Damash Gilan
(Iran) Mohsen Bengar	7	1	0	Sepahan
(Iran) Omid Khouraj	5	1	2	PAS Hamedan
(Iran) Hanif Omranzadeh	7	1	0	PAS Hamedan
(Iran) Alireza Vahedi Nikbakht	7	0	1	Persepolis
(Iran) Maziar Zare	8	0	0	Persepolis

=== Matches played ===
33

- (Iran) Morteza Ebrahimi (Mes)
- (Iran) Vahid Taleblou (Esteghlal)

== Sponsorship ==
- Referee's Sponsor: GERAD
- Referee's Supplier: Merooj

Team Shirt manufacturers

Team	Kit Manufacturer
Esteghlal	Uhlsport
Persepolis	Uhlsport
Rah Ahan	Uhlsport
Sepahan	Uhlsport
Aboomoslem	Merooj
Esteghlal Ahvaz	Merooj
Foolad	Merooj
Mes Kerman	Merooj
Moghavemat	Merooj
Paykan	Merooj
Payam	Merooj
Damash Gilan	Merooj
Saba	Merooj
Zob Ahan	Merooj
Bargh	Daei SWE
Malavan	Daei SWE
PAS Hamedan	Nahangi
Saipa	Nahangi

== Attendances ==
=== Average home attendances ===
Pos	Team	Total	High	Low	Average	Change
1	Persepolis	651,000	90,000	0	40,688	−32.2%
2	Esteghlal	615,000	90,000	10,000	36,176	+4.2%
3	Mes Kerman	123,000	15,000	1,000	7,235	−11.5%
4	Malavan	116,000	15,000	3,000	6,824	−35.4%
5	Bargh Shiraz	115,000	20,000	1,000	6,765	+29.2%
6	Foolad	109,000	20,000	2,000	6,412	n/a
7	Payam	103,000	40,000	1,000	6,059	n/a
8	Sepahan	98,000	15,000	2,000	5,765	−8.1%
9	Aboumoslem	90,000	35,000	1,000	5,294	−23.7%
10	Saipa	89,000	50,000	1,000	5,235	−37.8%
11	Moghavemat	86,000	20,000	1,000	5,059	+17.8%
12	Est. Ahvaz	85,000	20,000	1,000	5,000	−37.0%
12	Saba Qom	85,000	15,000	1,000	5,000	−32.5%
14	Zob Ahan	84,000	15,000	2,000	4,941	+55.6%
14	Rah Ahan	84,000	40,000	1,000	4,941	+86.7%
16	Paykan	68,000	12,000	1,000	4,000	+6.2%
17	Damash	67,000	15,000	1,000	3,941	n/a
18	PAS Hamedan	63,000	12,000	1,000	3,706	−45.7%
	League total	2,731,000	90,000	0	8,954	−20.3%

Updated to games played on 26 April 2009
Source: iplstats.com
Notes:
Matches with spectator bans are not included in average attendances
Pegah, Sanat Naft and Shirin Faraz played last season in Azadegan League
Paykan moved from Tehran to Qazvin
Saba Battery moved from Tehran to Qom
Damash replaced Pegah

=== Highest attendances ===
Rank	Home team	Score	Away team	Attendance	Date	Week	Stadium
1	Persepolis	2–0	Damash	90,000	25 September 2008	8	Azadi
1	Persepolis	1–1	Esteghlal	90,000	3 October 2008	9	Azadi
1	Esteghlal	1–1	Persepolis	90,000	13 February 2009	26	Azadi
4	Persepolis	0–1	Mes Kerman	60,000	11 September 2008	6	Azadi
4	Persepolis	3–2	Sepahan	60,000	26 October 2008	12	Azadi
4	Persepolis	1–1	Saipa	60,000	9 December 2008	18	Azadi
4	Esteghlal	2–1	Saba Qom	60,000	23 January 2009	23	Azadi
8	Persepolis	3–1	Bargh Shiraz	55,000	22 October 2008	11	Azadi
9	Saipa	1–1	Persepolis	50,000	4 August 2008	1	Azadi
9	Esteghlal	2–1	Rah Ahan	50,000	27 September 2008	8	Azadi

Notes:
Updated to games played on 26 April 2009. Source: iplstats.com

== See also ==
- 2008–09 Azadegan League
- 2008–09 Iran Football's 2nd Division
- 2008–09 Iran Football's 3rd Division
- 2008–09 Hazfi Cup
- Iranian Super Cup
- 2008–09 Iranian Futsal Super League
