= Hossein Hooshyar =

Iranian footballer

Personal information
- Full name: Mohammad-Hossein Hooshyar Hosseini
- Date of birth: February 8, 1984 (age 42)
- Place of birth: Mashhad, Iran
- Height: 1.85 m (6 ft 1 in)
- Position: Goalkeeper

Youth career
- 2000–2006: Payam Khorasan

Senior career*
Years	Team	Apps	(Gls)
2006–2011	Payam Khorasan	54	(0)
2011–2012	Shahrdari Yasuj	18	(0)
2012	Persepolis	6	(0)
2012–2013	Aboomoslem Khorasan	15	(0)
2013–2014	Albadr	6	(0)
2014	Gahar Doroud	9	(0)
2014–2015	Naft & Gaz Gachsaran	10	(0)

Managerial career
- 2015–2016: Nasle Aboomoslem (goalkeeping coach)
- 2016–2018: Aboomoslem Samen (goalkeeping coach)
- 2018–2019: Sanat (goalkeeping coach)
- 2019–2020: Negin Sanabad (goalkeeping coach)
- 2021–2022: Payam Toos (goalkeeping coach)
- 2022–2023: Pishgaman(goalkeeping coach)
- 2023–: Poshtibani(goalkeeping coach)
- * Club domestic league appearances and goals as of 8 July 2012

Hossein Hooshyar (Persian: حسین هوشیار; born 8 February 1984 in Mashhad, Iran) is an Iranian football goalkeeper and goalkeeping coach.

== Club career ==
=== Payam Khorasan ===
He was member of Payam Khorasan youth system in 2000–06. He joined Payam Mashhad in 2006.

=== Shahrdari Yasuj ===
He joined Shahrdari Yasuj in 2011 and his appearances made impression in 2011–12 Hazfi Cup when he saved 5 Penalties in 2 game against Tractor Sazi and Foolad. In semifinal game, he also played well against Esteghlal.

=== Persepolis ===
He joined Persepolis in January 2012, signing a 30-month contract lasting until end of 2013–14 season but after a disappointing showing, It was announced that he will be leave the club at the end of the season. His most important sport game was the Tehran 75 derby, which ended in Persepolis' favor with a hat-trick by Éamon Zayed

=== Club career statistics ===
As of 6 May 2012

Club performance			League		Cup		Continental		Total	
Season	Club	League	Apps	Goals	Apps	Goals	Apps	Goals	Apps	Goals
Iran			League		Hazfi Cup		Asia		Total	
2008–09	Payam Khorasan	Pro League	0	0	0	0	–		0	0
2009–10	Payam Khorasan	Division 1	26	0	2	0	–		28	0
2010–11	Payam Khorasan	Division 1	24	0	2	0	–		26	0
2011–12	Shahrdari Yasuj	Division 1	12	0	6	0	–		18	0
2011–12	Persepolis	Pro League	6	0	0	0	0	0	6	0
2012–13	Aboomoslem	Division 1	15	0	0	0	–		15	0
2013–14	Albadr	Division 1	6	0	0	0	–		6	0
2014	Gahar Doroud	Division 1	9	0	0	0	–		9	0
2014–15	Naft Gachsaran	Division 1	10	0	0	0	–		10	0
Career total			108	0	10	0	0	0	118	0

== Honours ==
- Payam Khorasan
  - Azadegan League
    - Champion (1): 2007–08
- Shahrdari Yasuj
  - Hazfi Cup
    - Semi-final (1): 2011–12
