= Mohammad Sahimi (footballer) =

Iranian footballer

Personal information
- Full name: Mohammad Sahimi
- Place of birth: Iran
- Position: Midfielder

Senior career*
Years	Team	Apps	(Gls)
2007–2010	Payam	51	(12)
2008	→ Aboo. (loan)	1	(0)
2009	→ Shahrdari (loan)	26	(6)
2010–2011	Shahrdari	5	(0)
2011–2012	Siah Jamegan Khorasan F.C.		
2012	Nassaji		
- * Club domestic league appearances and goals as of 10 September 2010 (UTC) ‡ National team caps and goals as of 30 April 2010

Mohammad Sahimi is an Iranian footballer who plays for Siah Jamegan Khorasan F.C.

== Club career ==
Sahimi has played for Shahrdari Tabriz since 2009, after joined the on loan from Payam Mashhad F.C.

=== Club Career Statistics ===
Last Update 10 September 2010

Club performance			League		Cup		Continental		Total	
Season	Club	League	Apps	Goals	Apps	Goals	Apps	Goals	Apps	Goals
Iran			League		Hazfi Cup		Asia		Total	
2007–08	Payam	Azadegan	25	6			-	-		
2008–09	Aboo.	Persian Gulf Cup	1	0			-	-		
2008–09	Payam	Persian Gulf Cup	30	6			-	-		
2009–10	Shahrdari	Azadegan	15	6	0	0	-	-	15	6
2010–11	Shahrdari	Persian Gulf Cup	7	0	1	0	-	-	8	0
Total	Iran		87	18			0	0		
Career total			87	18			0	0		

- Assist Goals

Season	Team	Assists
10-11	Shahrdari Tabriz	1
