= Salar Afrasiabi =

Iranian footballer

Personal information
- Date of birth: 10 September 1991 (age 35)
- Place of birth: Gorgan, Iran
- Height: 1.82 m (6 ft 0 in)
- Position: Midfielder

Youth career
- Aboomoslem

Senior career*
Years	Team	Apps	(Gls)
2012–2017	Siah Jamegan	45	(3)
2017–2018	Machine Sazi	10	(0)
2018	Padideh	8	(0)
2018–2019	Siah Jamegan	19	(1)
2019–2020	Shahrdari Mahshahr	17	(2)
2020–2021	Qashqai Shiraz	12	(0)
2021–2022	Payam Toos	4	(0)
2023–2024	Mehr Razavi	10	(0)
- * Club domestic league appearances and goals

Salar Afrasiabi (Persian: سالار افراسیابی; born 10 September 1991) is an Iranian former football midfielder.

== Club career ==
Afrasiabi started his career with Siah Jamegan from Division 2. He made his professional debut for Siah Jamegan on 30 July 2015 against Esteghlal as a starter.

== Club career statistics ==
As of 30 July 2015.

Club	Division	Season	League		Hazfi Cup		Asia		Total	
Club	Division	Season	Apps	Goals	Apps	Goals	Apps	Goals	Apps	Goals
Siah Jamegan	Division 1	2013–14	22	0	1	0	–	–	23	0
Siah Jamegan	Division 1	2014–15	17	0	0	0	–	–	17	0
Siah Jamegan	Pro League	2015–16	1	0	0	0	–	–	1	0
Career Totals			40	0	1	0	0	0	41	0
