= Amir Kian Mohammadi =

Iranian football player and coach

Personal information
- Date of birth: 28 April 1993 (age 33)
- Place of birth: Nishapur, Iran
- Height: 1.84 m (6 ft 0 in)
- Position: Right-back

Team information
- Current team: Aboomoslem Samen (assistant)

Youth career
- 2008–2009: Aboomoslem
- 2009–2011: Payam Khorasan

Senior career*
Years	Team	Apps	(Gls)
2011–2012	Payam Khorasan	23	(0)
2012–2014	Moghavemat Tehran	17	(1)
2014–2015	Payam Vahdat Khorasan	11	(0)
2015–2016	Danesh & Varzesh Mashhad	10	(2)
2016–2017	Ravan Baku	12	(1)
2017–2018	Sanat Khorasan	9	(0)
Total		82	(4)

International career
2014	Iran Students		

Managerial career
- 2019–2020: Montakhab Khorasan Razavi U13(assistant)
- 2020–2021: Chooka Talesh(assistant)
- 2021–2022: Payam Toos Khorasan(assistant)
- 2022–2023: Badamaki Mashhad U15(assistant)
- 2023: Shadkam Mashhad(assistant)
- 2023–2024: Poshtibani Nezaja(assistant)
- 2024: Shadkam Mashhad(assistant)
- 2024–2025: Ferdowsi Samen(assistant & analyst coach)
- 2025–: Aboomoslem Samen (assistant)
- * Club domestic league appearances and goals

Amir Kian Mohammadi (Persian: امیر کیان محمدی, born 28 April 1993) is an Iranian former footballer who played as a right-back for Payam Khorasan in the Azadegan League and Ravan Baku in the Azerbaijan First League.
