= Majid Hosseinipour =

Iranian footballer (born 1967)

Personal information
- Full name: Majid Hosseinipour
- Date of birth: 1967 (age 58–59)
- Place of birth: Mashhad, Iran
- Position: Midfielder

Senior career*
Years	Team	Apps	(Gls)
- Payam Khorasan
- Aboomoslem
- Zob Ahan F.C.

Managerial career
- Payam U23
- 2009: Payam Khorasan
- 2010: Gaz Sarakhs
- * Club domestic league appearances and goals as of April 2011

Majid Hosseinipour (Persian: مجید حسینی پور) (born 1967 in Mashhad, Iran) is a retired Iranian football player. After retirement he managed several clubs, including Payam Khorasan and more recently Sanat Gaz Sarakhs F.C.

== Playing career ==
He played for Payam Mashhad for 16 years, then spent a year playing for F.C. Aboomoslem before spending two years with Zobahan F.C.

== Managerial career ==
After retirement Hosseinipour coached Payam U23 for 2 years. In the next 6 years he was assistant coach of Payam Mashhad F.C. under notable managers such as Nader Dastneshan, Faraz Kamalvand, Reza Vatankhah, Hashem Rahbazan, Ali Hanteh, Hadi Bargizar and Khodadad Azizi. He was briefly head coach of Payam Mashhad from January to February 2009 and more recently was briefly head coach of Sanat Gaz Sarakhs F.C. until November 2010. He holds an AFC approved coaching certificate.
