= Abdou Moumouni =

Togolese footballer

Personal information
- Full name: Jafar Djabouro Moumouni
- Date of birth: November 19, 1982 (age 43)
- Place of birth: Togo
- Height: 1.84 m (6 ft 0 in)
- Position: Central defender

Senior career*
Years	Team	Apps	(Gls)
- Togo Telecom
- Wangen bei Olten
2000–2001	FC Grenchen		
2001	FC Alle		
2002–2003	SR Delémont	1	(0)
2003–2007	Concordia Basel	75	(3)
2007	Lausanne-Sport	10	(0)
2008	BSC Old Boys	12	(0)
2008	Chaux-de-Fonds	6	(0)
2008–2010	Aboomoslem	26	(0)

International career
2000–2010	Togo		
- * Club domestic league appearances and goals as of 20:05, 16 February 2010(UTC)

Jafar Djabouro Moumouni (born 19 November 1982) is a Togolese former footballer who played for F.C. Aboomoslem in the Iran Pro League.

He left Chaux-de-Fonds on 30 September 2008.

== Club career stats ==
Last update: 26 February 2010

Club performance			League		Cup		Continental		Total	
Season	Club	League	Apps	Goals	Apps	Goals	Apps	Goals	Apps	Goals
Switzerland			League		Schweizer Cup		Europe		Total	
2002–03	SR Delémont	Challenge League	1	0			-			
2003–04	Concordia Basel	Challenge League	12	1			-			
2004–05	Concordia Basel	Challenge League	28	0			-			
2005–06	Concordia Basel	Challenge League	25	2			-			
2006–07	Concordia Basel	Challenge League	10	0			-			
2007–08	Lausanne Sports	Challenge League	10	0			-			
2007–08	BSC Old Boys	1.Liga Gruppe 2	12	0			-			
2008–09	Chaux-de-Fonds	Challenge League	6	0			-			
Iran			League		Hazfi Cup		Asia		Total	
2008–09	Aboomoslem	Iran Pro League	12	0	0	0	-	-	12	0
2009–10	Aboomoslem	Iran Pro League	14	0	1	0	-	-	15	0
Total	Switzerland		104	3						
Total	Iran		26	0	1	0	0	0	27	0
Career total			130	3						
