= Takhti Stadium (Mashhad) =

Multi-purpose stadium in Mashhad, Iran

Coordinates: 36°18′02″N 59°35′25″E

- Interactive map of Takhti Stadium
- Full name: Takhti Stadium
- Former names: Zibandeh, Saadabad
- Location: Mashhad, Iran
- Owner: Khorasan Razavi Football Association
- Operator: Khorasan Razavi Football Association
- Capacity: 15,000 (Football)
- Surface: Grass

Construction
- Built: 1951

Tenants
- Aboomoslem (1970–2004); Siah Jamegan (2013–)

The Takhti Stadium (Persian: استاديوم تختی) formerly known by names as Zibandeh and later Saadabad Stadium, is a multi-purpose stadium in Mashhad, Iran. It is currently used mostly for football matches and is the home stadium of Payam Mashhad. The stadium holds 15,000 people. From 2013 it is also the home ground of Siah Jamegan.

== Infrastructure ==
The complex is composed of two grass fields which hosts football matches and used for training purposes.

== Important matches ==
On 5 February 1985, Takhti Stadium was the venue of an International Friendly between Iran and North Korea. The match finished 1–0 for Iran and Shahin Bayani scored the goal. The 2001 AK Pipe International Cup was played at this venue, with Abomooslem crowned as champions.

== Notable matches ==
Iran National Football Team

Date	Team #1	Res.	Team #2	Competition	Attendance	Remarks
5 February 1985	Iran	1–0	North Korea	Friendly match	17,000	Hosted the first national team match in Mashhad
1990	Khorasan XI	0–0	Iran	Unofficial Friendly match	15,000	Khorasan XI held the National Team to a 0–0 draw.

Other Matches

Date	Team #1	Res.	Team #2	Competition	Attendance	Remarks
1991	Aboomoslem	1–0	Persepolis	1991–92 Azadegan League	?	Tehran giants Persepolis lost in Mashhad for the first time.
20 April 2001	Abumoslem	2-1	Payam	Second Division 2000/01	?	Mashhad derby
16 April 2002	Abumoslem	1-1	Persepolis	2001–02 Iran Pro League	?	Persepolis tie in Mashhad
19 May 2002	Abumoslem	1-1	Esteghlal	2001–02 Iran Pro League	10,000	Esteghlal tie in Mashhad
8 November 2002	Abumoslem	2-2	Esteghlal	2002–03 Iran Pro League	12,000	Esteghlal tie in Mashhad
12 May 2004	Payam	3-2	Persepolis	2003/04 Hazfi Cup Round of 16	10,000	Persepolis defeated
26 November 2009	Payam	1–0	Gaz Sarakhs	2009/10 Hazfi Cup	?	Duel of Khorasan physical game 2 red carded and 6 yellow
