= Hamid Reza Ebrahimi =

Iranian football player (born 1976)

Personal information
- Full name: Hamid Reza Ebrahimi
- Date of birth: 16 January 1976 (age 50)
- Place of birth: Mashhad, Iran
- Position: Midfielder

Senior career*
Years	Team	Apps	(Gls)
1999–2000	Aboomoslem		(12)
2000–2002	Pas		(1)
2002–2004	Saipa		
2004–2005	Saba		
2005–2006	Shahid Ghandi Yazd	14	(2)
2006–2007	Bargh	11	(2)

International career^{‡}
2000	Iran	3	(0)
- * Club domestic league appearances and goals as of 5 January 2012 ‡ National team caps and goals as of 5 January 2012

Hamid Reza Ebrahimi (Persian: حمیدرضا ابراهیمی; born 16 January 1976) is a retired Iranian football player. During his playing career he played for Aboomoslem, PAS, SAIPA, Saba, Shahid Ghandi Yazd and Bargh.

He was a member of Iran national football team at the 2000 WAFF Championship.

== Achievements ==
- Winner: 2000 WAFF Championship with Iran national football team
