= Fuad Salihović =

Serbian footballer

Personal information
- Date of birth: 2 November 1985 (age 41)
- Place of birth: Novi Pazar, SFR Yugoslavia
- Height: 1.82 m (6 ft 0 in)
- Position: Midfielder

Team information
- Current team: FSG Homberg/Ober-Ofleiden

Senior career*
Years	Team	Apps	(Gls)
2002–2003	Javor Ivanjica	16	(0)
2004–2005	Sarajevo	8	(0)
2005–2006	Radnički Niš	25	(1)
2006–2007	BASK	18	(1)
2007–2011	Novi Pazar	31	(3)
2008	→ Aboomoslem (loan)		
2011	Javor Ivanjica	2	(0)
2012	Rudar Kostolac	17	(2)
2013	BASK	24	(2)
2014	Jošanica	8	(1)
2014	Goražde	8	(1)
2015	Moravac Mrštane	14	(1)
2016	Dinamo Vranje		
2016-2018	Vatanspor	15	(1)
2018-2024	SG Westend Frankfurt	89	(22)
2024-	FSG Homberg/Ober-Ofleiden	1	(0)
- * Club domestic league appearances and goals

Fuad Salihović (Serbian Cyrillic: Фуад Салиховић; born 2 November 1985) is a Serbian footballer who plays as a midfielder.

== Career ==
Born in Novi Pazar, Salihović played with FK Javor Ivanjica in the Second League of FR Yugoslavia before joining once a usual participant in the Yugoslav First League, FK Sarajevo, then playing in the Premier League of Bosnia and Herzegovina. Next he returned to Serbia and played with FK Radnički Niš and FK BASK before joining FK Novi Pazar where he will play 4 seasons, except half season on loan in Iran with F.C. Aboomoslem. He will play again with Javor in 2011, this time in the Serbian SuperLiga, and later will change several clubs such as FK Rudar Kostolac, BASK again, and FK Jošanica. During the winter break of the 2014–15 season he will join Serbian second-level side FK Moravac Mrštane after spending the previous half-season with FK Goražde, at time at the top of the First League of the Federation of Bosnia and Herzegovina, one of two second levels in Bosnia.
