= Adel Sarshar =

Iranian footballer (born 1992)

Personal information
- Full name: Adel Sarshar Kherghi
- Date of birth: January 3, 1992 (age 34)
- Place of birth: Iran
- Position: Defender

Team information
- Current team: Gostaresh Foolad
- Number: 12

Senior career*
Years	Team	Apps	(Gls)
2013–2014	Aboomoslem	14	(3)
2014–	Gostaresh Foolad	7	(0)
- * Club domestic league appearances and goals as of 9 April 2015

Adel Sarshar (born 1992) is an Iranian football defender who since 2014 has played for the Iranian football club Gostaresh Foolad in the Iran Pro League.
