= 1977–78 Iran 2nd Division =

Iran Football's 2nd Division
- Season: 1977–78
- Champions: Aboomoslem
- Promoted: Aboomoslem; Rastakhiz Khorramshahr
- Relegated: Iranjavan; Bank Sepah

The following were the standings at the conclusion of Iran Football's 2nd Division 1977–78 football season. Aboomoslem won the division title.

== League standings ==
Pos	Team	Pld	W	D	L	GF	GA	GD	Pts	Promotion or relegation
1	Aboomoslem	22	11	9	2	21	9	+12	31	Promoted 1978–79 Takht Jamshid Cup
2	Rastakhiz Khorramshahr	22	10	9	3	34	18	+16	29	Promoted 1978–79 Takht Jamshid Cup
3	Ararat	22	9	10	3	21	9	+12	28	
4	Sepidrood	22	8	11	3	19	9	+10	27	
5	Khaneh Javanan Sari	22	6	12	4	23	18	+5	24	
6	Atash Neshani Kermanshah	22	6	8	8	19	22	−3	20	
7	Hakhamanesh	22	7	5	10	18	24	−6	19	
8	Tehranjavan	22	3	12	7	14	15	−1	18	
9	Saneye Elektirik Shiraz	22	6	6	10	18	25	−7	18	
10	Pahlavi Tehran	22	4	10	8	17	26	−9	18	
11	Bank Sepah	22	5	8	9	16	29	−13	17 (Note: 1 point deducted?)	Relegated to 3rd Division
12	Iranjavan	22	2	10	10	15	32	−17	14	Relegated to 3rd Division

== See also ==
- 1977–78 Takht Jamshid Cup
