= Abbas Chamanyan =

Iranian football coach (born 1963)

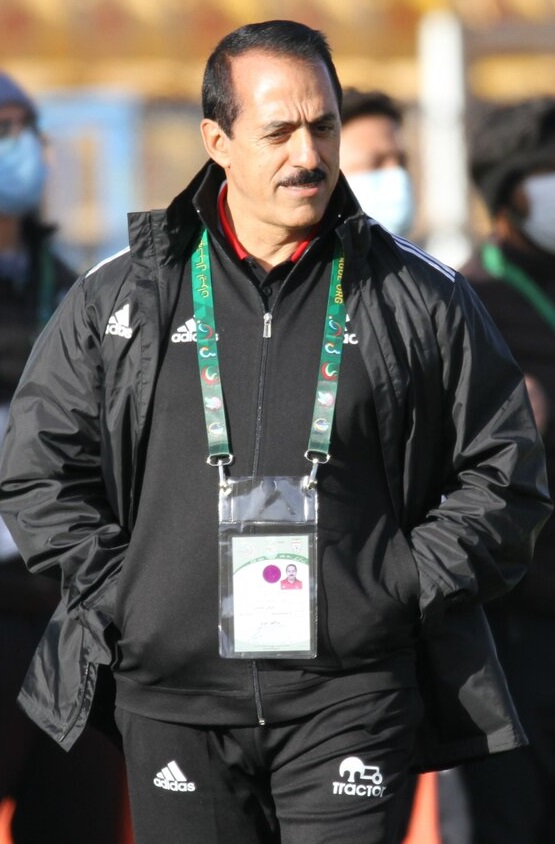

Personal information
- Full name: Abbas Chamanyan
- Date of birth: May 10, 1963 (age 63)
- Place of birth: Mashhad, Iran

Managerial career
- Years: Team
- 1991–1992: Basij Mashhad
- 1992–1993: Turbo
- 1993–1994: Fajr Mashhad
- 1994–1995: Pars-Khodro Mashhad
- 1995–1996: Fath Khorasan
- 1998–2001: Payam Khorasan
- 2002: Iran U20
- 2003: Iran U17
- 2003–2004: Iran U20
- 2004: Payam Khorasan
- 2005: Payam Khorasan
- 2007: Payam Khorasan
- 2008–2009: Payam Khorasan
- 2010–2011: Payam Khorasan
- 2011–2012: Shahrdari Yasuj
- 2014–2015: Naft Gachsaran
- 2016–2018: Iran U17
- 2020–2021: Tractor(Technical manager)
- 2024–2025: Iran U17

Abbas Chamanian (born May 10, 1963) is an Iranian football coach who is AFC certified and currently head coach of Iran national under-17 football team. He is also a university lecturer who teaches Physical Education courses at Ferdowsi University of Mashhad, Islamic Azad University of Mashhad and Mashhad University of Medical Sciences. He has numerous years of experience at club level and international level.

== Managerial career ==
=== Club Level ===
- FC Aboomoslem U23 Team 1996-1997 and a member of the Technical Board during various years.
- Payam Khorasan U23 Team 1997-1998
- Also Head Coach of many teams from Mashhad: Basij Mashhad, Turbo Mashhad, Fajr Mashhad, Pars-Khodro Mashhad, Fath Khorasan and Payam Khorasan.
- Mashhad University of Medical Sciences 1991–present

=== National & International ===
- Khorasan Province under-17 Team 1990
- Khorasan Province under-20 1993-1994
- Khorasan Province under-23 Team 1995
- Iran national under-17 football team 2003-2004
- Iran national under-20 football team 2002, 2004
- Iran Universities National Team 2003, 2005

== Honours ==
- Runner Up Khorasan Province Youth Team in 1990
- Fourth Place Iran national under-20 football team in 2004
- Fifth Place Iran Universities National Team in 2003 World University Games in Seoul.
- Runner up Iran u17 national team in AFC U16 CHAMPIONSHIP in 2016 India
