= Reza Sahebi =

Iranian footballer and coach

Personal information
- Full name: Reza Sahebi
- Date of birth: February 25, 1972 (age 54)
- Place of birth: Mashhad, Iran
- Position: Striker

Senior career*
Years	Team	Apps	(Gls)
1989–1997	Payam Khorasan		
1997–2003	Zob Ahan	147	(49)
2003–2007	Payam Khorasan		

Managerial career
- 2007–2010: Payam Khorasan (assistant coach)
- 2010: Payam Khorasan (caretaker coach)
- 2010–2011: Sanat Gaz Sarakhs
- 2011–2012: Payam Khorasan
- * Club domestic league appearances and goals as of August 2007 ‡ National team caps and goals as of August 2007

Reza Sahebi (Persian: رضا صاحبی born February 25, 1972) is a retired Iranian football player and coach.

== Playing career ==
=== Club career ===
He played for Payam Mashhad from 1989–1997 before joining F.C. Zob Ahan where he played from 1997–2003. In 2003, he returned to his former club Payam Mashhad. Sahebi was the top goal scorer of the Iranian Football League during the 2000–01 season, when he scored 14 goals for F.C. Zob Ahan. He was captain of Payam Mashhad for many years. He retired in 2007.

=== Club career statistics ===
In top league, he has scored 20 goals for Payam and 49 goals for Zobahan.

Club performance			League		Cup		Continental		Total	
Season	Club	League	Apps	Goals	Apps	Goals	Apps	Goals	Apps	Goals
Iran			League		Hazfi Cup		Asia		Total	
1994–95	Payam	Azadegan League	?	6			-	-		
1996–97	Payam	Azadegan League	?	14			-	-		
1997–98	Zobahan	Azadegan League	?	?			-	-		
1998–99	Zobahan	Azadegan League	?	?			-	-		
1999–00	Zobahan	Azadegan League	?	10			-	-		
2000–01	Zobahan	Azadegan League	?	14			-	-		
2001–02	Zobahan	Persian Gulf Cup	?	6			-	-		
2002–03	Zobahan	Persian Gulf Cup	?	6			-	-		
Total	Iran		?	69						

== Managerial career ==
- Payam Mashhad First Team Assistant Coach 2007-June 2010
- Payam Mashhad Temporary Head Coach June 2010
- Sanat Gaz Sarakhs F.C. Head Coach November 2010-
