= Younes Masoudi =

Iranian footballer

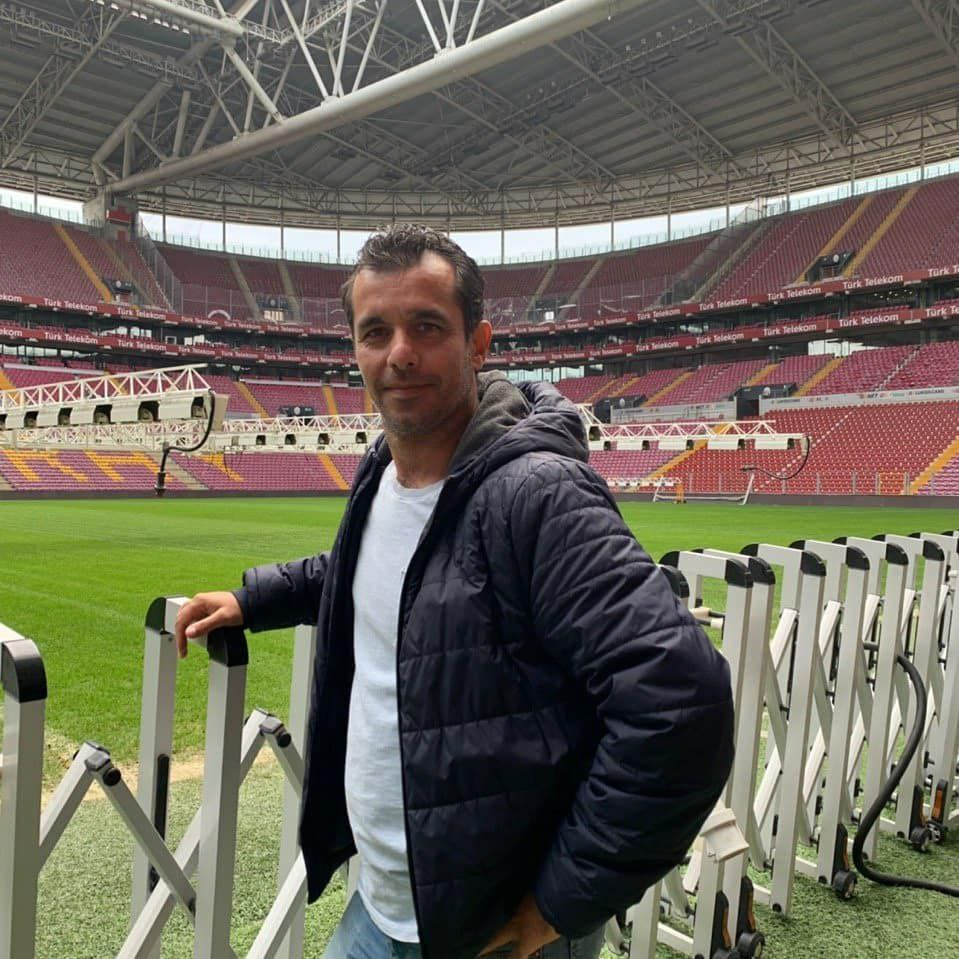

Personal information
- Date of birth: 13 April 1981 (age 45)
- Place of birth: Bojnord, Iran
- Height: 1.86 m (6 ft 1 in)
- Position: Defender

Youth career
- 1996–2001: Payam Paykan

Senior career*
Years	Team	Apps	(Gls)
2001–2011	Payam Khorasan	171	(3)
2011–2012	Shahrdari Yasuj	16	(1)
Total		187	(4)

International career
2007	Iran Students		

Managerial career
- 2018: Academy Ultimate Of Immigrant ZA Istanbul
- 2022: Payam Toos Khorasan(caretaker)
- 2022–23: Payam Toos U18
- 2023: Payam Toos U21
- * Club domestic league appearances and goals

Younes Masoudi (Persian: يونس مسعودي; born 13 April 1981) is an Iranian retired footballer who played as a defender. During his 13-year career, he appeared for Payam Khorasan and Shahrdari Yasuj.

== Playing career ==
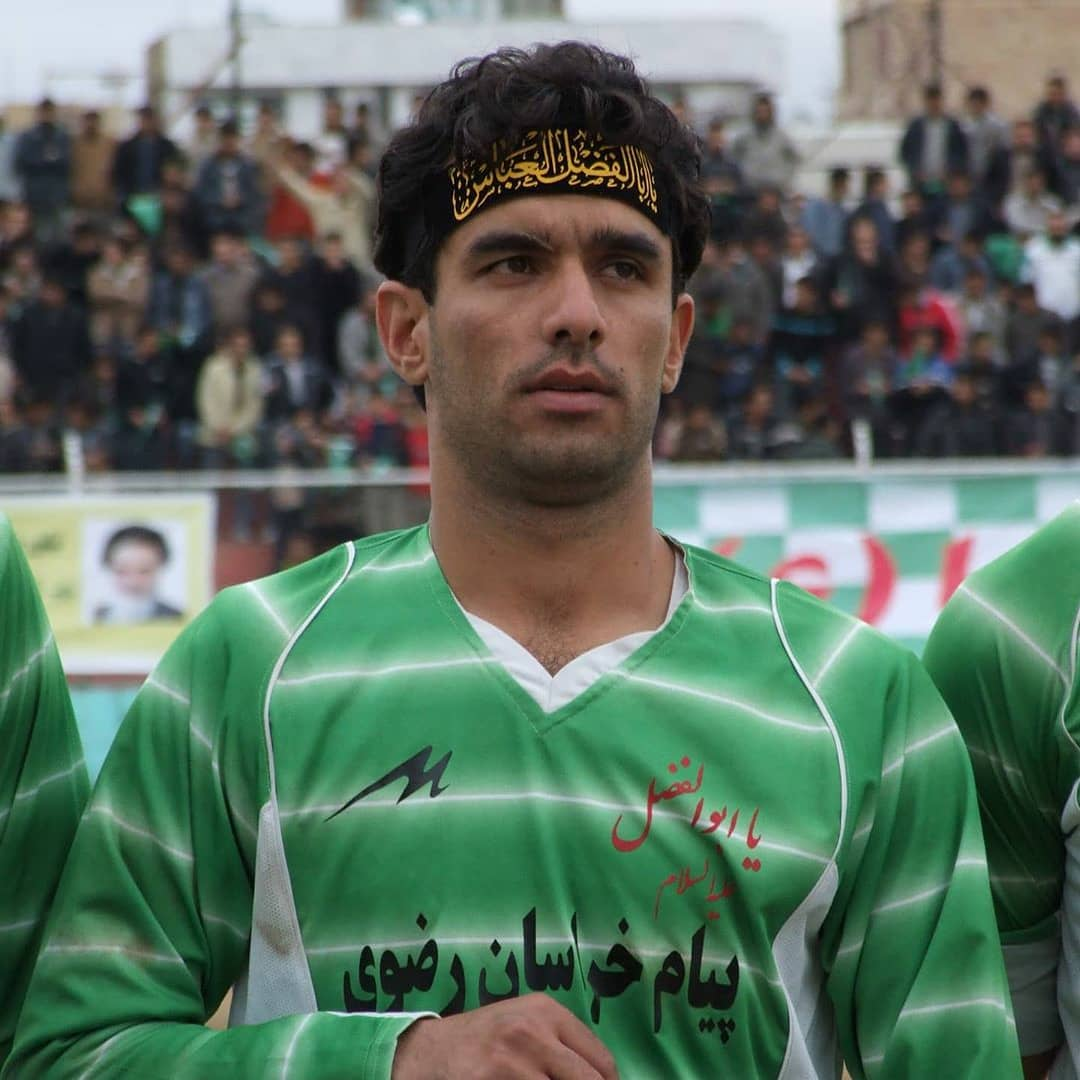
Masoudi in Azadegan League 2007–08

Masoudi joined the youth teams of Payam Khorasan in 1996. He started his professional career with the club in 2001. On 23 January 2009, Masoudi made his professional debut, starting in Persian Gulf Cup action against PAS Hamedan. He played the full 90 minutes in a 4–1 defeat for Payam.

After playing ten seasons with Payam, including a stint as the club captain, Masoudi moved to Shahrdari Yasuj in the summer of 2011.

== Coaching career ==
Payam Khorasan established the Payam Football Academy in 2010; while still playing for the club, Masoudi was appointed as the first director of the academy. He continued as a coach after retiring as a player, earning his B license from the Asian Football Confederation.

In 2020, he launched a campaign on Instagram to revive her favorite club, Payam Khorasan.

== Honours ==
Payam Khorasan

- Azadegan League : Champion 2007–08

Shahrdari Yasuj

- Hazfi Cup : Semi Final 2011–12
