= Mehdi Asgarkhani =

Iranian footballer

Personal information
- Full name: Mehdi Asgarkhani
- Date of birth: March 25, 1948 (age 78)
- Place of birth: Tehran, Iran
- Height: 1.85 m (6 ft 1 in)
- Position: Goalkeeper

Senior career*
Years	Team	Apps	(Gls)
1968–1971	Persepolis		
1969–1970	→ Paykan (loan)		
1972–1974	Al-Salmiya		
1974–1984	Aboomoslem		

International career
1976	Iran	1	(0)

Managerial career
- 1984: Aboomoslem
- * Club domestic league appearances and goals

Mehdi Asgarkani (born March 25, 1948) is an Iranian football goalkeeper who joined the Iranian national team in the 1976 Asian Cup. He also played for Persepolis and Aboomoslem.

== Honours ==
Iran

- Asian Cup: 1976
