= Behrouz Pakniat =

Iranian footballer

Personal information
- Full name: Behrouz Pakniat
- Date of birth: September 21, 1977 (age 49)
- Place of birth: Behbahan, Iran
- Position: Midfielder

Youth career
- 1992–1993: Abo Bargh Behbahan
- 1993–1996: Persepolis Behbahan
- 1996–1997: Pas Behbahan
- 1997–1999: Entezam Ahvaz

Senior career*
Years	Team	Apps	(Gls)
1999–2000	Foolad F.C.		
2000–2002	Payam Mashhad F.C.		
2003–2004	Shamoushak Noshahr F.C.	22	(2)
2004–2006	Bargh Shiraz		
2006–2007	Sanaye Arak		
2007–2008	Shahrdari Tabriz F.C.		
2008–2010	Payam Mashhad F.C.		
2011	Khayr Vahdat FK		

International career
2001	Iran U23		
- * Club domestic league appearances and goals

Behrouz Pakniat (Persian: بهروز پاک‌نیت, Tajik: Беҳрӯз Покният) is an Iranian professional footballer who last played for Khayr Vahdat FK.

== Club career ==
Pakniat played for Bargh Shiraz F.C. from 2003 to 2006. He then played for Sanaye Arak F.C. from 2006. In 2010, he was playing for Payam Mashhad F.C.
