= Ștefan Stănculescu =

Romanian footballer (1923–2013)

Ştefan Stănculescu
Personal information
- Date of birth: 16 September 1923
- Place of birth: Bucharest, Romania
- Date of death: 4 October 2013 (aged 90)
- Place of death: Romania
- Position: Goalkeeper

Youth career
- 1937–1942: Sportul Studenţesc

Senior career*
| Years | Team | Apps | (Gls) |
| 1942–1946 | Sportul Studenţesc | | |
| 1946–1947 | Șurianul Sebeș | | |
| 1947–1948 | Unirea Tricolor | | |
| 1949–1953 | Metalul București | | |

Managerial career
- 1956–1957: Muscelul Câmpulung
- 1958–1974: Dinamo București (youth team)
- 1974: Aboomoslem
- 1974–1976: Zaire
- * Club domestic league appearances and goals

Ştefan Stănculescu (Persian: استفان استانکولسکو; 16 September 1923 – 4 October 2013) was a Romanian football player and coach.

== Managerial career ==
Stănculescu was youth coach of Dinamo Bucharest from 1958 to 1974 He managed F.C. Aboomoslem, an Iranian club, during the 1970s.

He also coached Zaire from 1974 to 1976.
