= Moein Abbasian =

Iranian defender

Personal information
- Full name: Moein Abbasian
- Date of birth: 18 August 1989 (age 37)
- Place of birth: Mashhad, Iran
- Height: 1.78 m (5 ft 10 in)
- Positions: Left back; winger

Team information
- Current team: Havadar
- Number: 23

Youth career
- 2011: Aboumoslem

Senior career*
Years	Team	Apps	(Gls)
2008–2011	Aboumoslem	9	(0)
2011–2013	Niroye Zamini	39	(1)
2013–2018	Padideh	93	(8)
2018–2020	Saipa	51	(6)
2020–2021	Paykan	6	(0)
2021	Aluminium Arak	10	(0)
2021–	Havadar	28	(0)
- * Club domestic league appearances and goals as of 30 September 2021

Moein Abbasian (Persian: معین عباسیان; born August 18, 1989) is an Iranian defender who currently plays for Iranian football club Havadar in the Persian Gulf Pro League.

== Club career ==
Sadeghi joined Saba Qom in 2011 after spending the previous year at Sanati Kaveh.

Club performance			League		Cup		Continental		Total	
Season	Club	League	Apps	Goals	Apps	Goals	Apps	Goals	Apps	Goals
Iran			League		Hazfi Cup		Asia		Total	
2012–13	Niroye Zamini	Division 1	21	1			–	–		
2013–14	Padideh	Division 1	15	0			–	–		
2014–15	Padideh	Pro League	11	0	2	0	–	–	13	0
2015–16	Padideh	Pro League	23	2	2	0	–	–	25	2
2016–17	Padideh	Pro League	28	3	0	0	–	–	28	3
2017–18	Padideh	Pro League	24	3	1	1	–	–	25	4
Career total			122	9	5	0	–	–	127	9
