= 1995–96 Iran 2nd Division =

Iran Football's 2nd Division
- Season: 1995–96
- Champions: Payam Gach Mashhad; Sanat Naft
- Promoted: Payam Gach Mashhad; Sanat Naft; Tractor; Zob Ahan
- Relegated: Rah va Trabari Ardebi; Javan Sari; Kombayn Sazi; Khalij Marvdasht

In the 1995–96 Iran 2nd Division football season was played in two group of nine teams each. The top four teams at the end of the second round (Payam Gach Mashhad, Sanat Naft, Tractor and Zob Ahan) gained promotion to the Azadegan League.

== First round ==
=== Group 1 ===
Pos	Team	Pld	W	D	L	GF	GA	GD	Pts	Promotion or relegation
1	Payam Gach Mashhad	16	10	2	4	24	12	+12	32	Promoted to 1996–97 Azadegan League
2	Tractor	16	9	5	2	20	10	+10	32	Promoted to 1996–97 Azadegan League
3	Aboomoslem	16	8	6	2	24	12	+12	30	
4	Nassaji Mazandaran	16	8	5	3	17	7	+10	29	
5	Chooka Talesh	16	6	7	3	16	10	+6	25	
6	Naft Ghaemshhar	16	5	5	6	16	16	0	20	
7	Esteghlal Shahrdari Rasht	16	3	5	8	17	21	−4	14	
8	Javan Sari	16	1	6	9	13	27	−14	9	Relegated to 3rd Division
9	Rah va Trabari Ardebi	16	1	1	14	6	37	−31	4	Relegated to 3rd Division

Source: rsssf.com

=== Group 2 ===
Pos	Team	Pld	W	D	L	GF	GA	GD	Pts	Promotion or relegation
1	Sanat Naft	16	10	3	3	23	13	+10	33	Promoted to 1996–97 Azadegan League
2	Zob Ahan	16	9	4	3	26	13	+13	31	Promoted to 1996–97 Azadegan League
3	Pars Khodro	16	6	8	2	20	11	+9	26	
4	Amaliyat Mahshahr	16	6	6	4	23	19	+4	24	
5	Rah Ahan	16	5	6	5	17	14	+3	21	
6	Shahrdari Rahnan	16	4	6	6	16	20	−4	18	
7	Shahin Bushehr	16	4	3	9	13	22	−9	15	
8	Khalij Marvdasht	16	2	7	7	12	20	−8	13	Relegated to 3rd Division
9	Kombayn Sazi	16	3	3	10	12	29	−17	12	Relegated to 3rd Division

Source: rsssf.com
