= Naser Pourmehdi =

Iranian association football player and coach

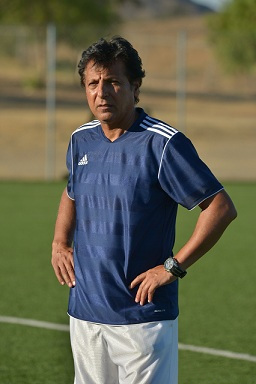

Personal information
- Full name: Naser Pourmehdi
- Date of birth: August 2, 1959 (age 67)
- Place of birth: Isfahan, Iran

Team information
- Current team: BYSC Corona United

Managerial career
- Years: Team
- 1993–1998: (Coach of Zob-Ahan )
- 1998–1999: (Head coach of Folad-Mobarakeh)
- 1999–2000: (Head of coach Zob-Ahan Youth team )
- 2001–2004: (Participating in Asia Champion League)
- 2004–2005: Serving well in Isfahan Sepahan (Iran pro league)
- 2004–2005: (Head coach of Folad-Mobarakeh Sepahan club)
- 2005–2006: (Coach of Peykan club)
- 2006–2007: (Coach of Peykan club)
- 2009–2010: (Head coach of Aboo-Moslem club)
- 2010–2011: (Head coach of Hamyari (Shahr Dari Arak) 1st division)
- 2013: (Director coaches of BYSC corona united soccer club in California-USA)

Naser Pourmehdi (Persian: ناصر پور مهدی; born 1959, Isfahan, Iran) is an Iranian retired football player and current coach.

== Early life ==
He was born in 1959 in Isfahan, Iran. He graduated from Azad University.

== Playing career ==
- 1973–1974: playing for Alborz Club-Esfahan
- 1975–1976: Playing for Isfahan Young Adults Representatives
- 1977–1978: Playing for Isfahan Youths Representatives
- 1976–1978 (3 Years): Playing for Zob-Ahan Club in Takhte-Jamshid National League in Youths and Adults age group.
- 1979–1980: Playing for Isfahan Bargh Club and winning the Championship Title in Isfahan Province.
- 1981–1982: Playing for Esfahan Pas Club.
- 1983–1984: Playing for Esfahan Gendarmerie (Army) Club and Standing the 1st Provincial Place in Isfahan Province through competition held for selecting the qualified team for the National League.
- 1985–1986: playing for Isfahan Sazman Goosht club and standing the 2nd Provincial in the National cup league
- 1982–1984–1985–1986: Playing for Isfahan Province Adults Representatives, taking part in the National Championship Completions and Ghods League for five years and winning the National Championship Title two times.
- 1987–1988: Playing for Najaf Abad Azad University, winning the Championship Title in the region and the 2nd in the country.
- 1988–1989: Playing for Tehran Sazman Goosht club, winning the 1st title in division 2 league.
- 1990–1991: Playing for Tehran Keshvarz Club, meeting qualification for playing in Iran National League.
- 1992–1993: Playing for Isfahan Zob-Ahan Club, winning the provincial championship title and meeting qualifications for playing in the National League.

== Coaching career ==
- 1979–1982: Head coach of Isfahan pas club for four years
- 1979–1982: Head coach and coach of different age-group provincial representatives in Isfahan during the National Championship Competitions, and winning different titles.
- 1983–1984: Head coach of Isfahan Gandarmerie (army) Club, winning the 1st provincial title held for selecting the qualified teams for the National League.
- 1988–1989: Head coach of Najaf Abad Azad University; winning the 1st title in the region and the 2nd national place held in Mashhad.
- 1993–1998: coach of Zob-Ahan (Iran pro league) for five years during National League Of Azadegan
- 1998–1999: Head coach of Folad-Mobarakeh (Iran pro league) for one year during the 1st Division League
- 1999–2000: Head coach of Zob-Ahan (Iran pro league) Youth Team, winning Provincial Championship
- 2001–2004: Serving well in Isfahan Sepahan (Iran pro league) Club for four years and winning the championship title in the National premier League held in 2001 to 2004; winning championship of the knockoff League 2002–2003
- 2004–2005: Participating in Asia Championship League via Folad-Mobarakeh Sepahan (Iran pro league) Club
- 2004–2005: Head coach of Folad-Mobarakeh Sepahan (Iran pro league) Club
- 2005–2006: Coach of Peyakan (Iran pro league) Club
- 2006–2007: Coach of Peyakan (Iran pro league) Club
- 2009–2010: Head coach of Aboo-Moslem club
- 2010–2011: head coach of Hamyari (Shahr Dari Arak) 1st division.
- 2013–2013: Director coaches of BYSC corona united soccer club in California-USA

== Coaching Qualification ==
- A specific course for young adults and youths in Tehran supervised by the Football Federation
- participation in Football Physiology Exercise Workshop (by Thomas Reilly in 2000)
- Holding class B Certificate from Asia Football Confederation
- Holding Futtor Certificate (Dr Hesham Montaser -FIFA Instructor from Switzerland)
- Holding an Advanced Football Coaching Certificate (by Billt Bingham from England, FIFA Instructor)
- Holding an Advanced Football Coaching Certificate (by Philip Ridden from France, FIFA Instructor)
- Holding an Advanced Football Coaching Certificate (by Roteh Muller from Germany)
- Holding an Advanced Certificate (A) from the Asia Football Confederation (by Reinhard Schom from Germany)
- Holding the Futsal Coaching Certificate (by Khaviar Louzano from Spain)
- Holding the Futsal Coaching Certificate (by Victor Hermanse - coach of the Netherlands)
- Holding the pro license (professional football coach license) by Asian football confederation-instructor of FIFA: Roteh Muller from Germany 2008.

== As an instructor (1997–2000) ==
- Teaching specific courses for different age groups in Isfahan
- Teaching Class B and C coaching courses in Isfahan and Keraman
- Teaching Class D in Isfahan
- Teaching Class C in Isfahan for three times
- Teaching Class C in Kerman once
- Teaching Class C in Yazd once
- Teaching assistant of Class A in Isfahan ran by Reinhard Fabich from Germany

Participating in specious courses designed for instructors of Asia Football Federation and Confederation
