= Afshin Kamaei =

Iranian footballer

Personal information
- Full name: Afshin Kamaei
- Date of birth: September 16, 1974 (age 52)
- Place of birth: Iran
- Position: Midfielder

Team information
- Current team: Esteghlal Khuzestan (team manager)

Senior career*
Years	Team	Apps	(Gls)
2002–2012	Esteghlal Ahvaz		(6)

Managerial career
- 2011: Esteghlal Ahvaz (caretaker)
- 2018–: Esteghlal Khuzestan (team manager)
- * Club domestic league appearances and goals as of 28 April 2010

Afshin Kamaie (born September 16, 1974) is a retired Iranian footballer.

== Club career ==
=== Club career statistics ===
As of 1 June 2010

Club performance			League		Cup		Continental		Total	
Season	Club	League	Apps	Goals	Apps	Goals	Apps	Goals	Apps	Goals
Iran			League		Hazfi Cup		Asia		Total	
2002–03	Eteghlal Ahvaz	Persian Gulf Cup		1			-	-		
2003–04	Eteghlal Ahvaz	Persian Gulf Cup	13	1			-	-		
2004–05	Eteghlal Ahvaz	Persian Gulf Cup	7	0			-	-		
2005–06	Eteghlal Ahvaz	Persian Gulf Cup	7	0			-	-		
2006–07	Eteghlal Ahvaz	Persian Gulf Cup	19	1			-	-		
2007–08	Eteghlal Ahvaz	Persian Gulf Cup	12	2			-	-		
2008–09	Eteghlal Ahvaz	Persian Gulf Cup	5	0			-	-		
2009–10	Eteghlal Ahvaz	Persian Gulf Cup	11	1		0	-	-		1
Total	Iran			6			0	0		
Career total				6			0	0		

- Assist Goals

Season	Team	Assists
09–10	Esteghlal Ahvaz	0
