= Moslem Firoozabadi =

Iranian football player

Personal information
- Full name: Moslem Firoozabadi
- Place of birth: Iran
- Height: 1.80 m (5 ft 11 in)
- Position: Striker

Team information
- Current team: Almineuem

Youth career
- 2001–2007: Gol Gohar

Senior career*
Years	Team	Apps	(Gls)
2007–2011	Gol Gohar		(15)
2011–	Mes Sarcheshmeh	27	(2)
- * Club domestic league appearances and goals as of 24 August 2011 ‡ National team caps and goals as of 25 November 2010

Moslem Firoozabadi (Persian: مسلم فیروزآبادی) is an Iranian football player playing for Almineuem of the IPL.

He is believed to be one of the best players of Kerman province but some injuries could not allow him to get the most out of his talent.

== Career ==
Firoozabadi played for Gol Gohar from 2007.

Club performance			League		Cup		Continental		Total	
Season	Club	League	Apps	Goals	Apps	Goals	Apps	Goals	Apps	Goals
Iran			League		Hazfi Cup		Asia		Total	
2008–09	Gol Gohar	Division 1	?	4		0	-	-		0
2008–09	Gol Gohar	Division 1	?	1		0	-	-		0
2009–10	Gol Gohar	Division 1	22	5		0	-	-		0
2010–11	Gol Gohar	Division 1	14	6		0	-	-		0
2011–12	Mes Sarcheshmeh	Pro League	27	2	0	0	-	-	27	2
Career total			63	18		0	0	0		0

== External sources ==
- Profile at Persianleague
