= Christian Carvalho =

Brazilian footballer (born 1980)

Personal information
- Full name: Cristian Luciano de Carvalho
- Date of birth: April 14, 1980 (age 46)
- Place of birth: Ipatinga, Brazil
- Height: 5 ft 10 in (1.78 m)
- Position: Forward

Youth career
- Ipatinga

Senior career*
Years	Team	Apps	(Gls)
- Ipatinga
- Gama
- Cruzeiro
2008	Niki Volos		
2009	Paykan		
2010	Charlotte Eagles	5	(0)
- * Club domestic league appearances and goals as of August 15, 2010

Cristian Luciano de Carvalho (born April 14, 1980) is a Brazilian footballer who last played for Charlotte Eagles in the USL Second Division.

== Career ==
Carvalho played for the youth team of Brazilian professional side Ipatinga, and went on to play for Gama and Cruzeiro. He moved to Greece to play for Niki Volos in 2008, and played for Paykan in Iran in 2009.

Carvalho signed with Charlotte Eagles of the USL Second Division in 2010, after a good showing at their invitational-only tryout. He made his debut on for the Eagles on June 12, 2010 in a game against the Real Maryland Monarchs.

He was not listed on the 2011 roster for Charlotte.
