= Mohammed Reza Pourmohammad =

Iranian footballer (born 1987)

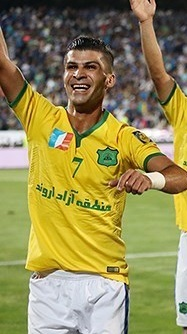

Personal information
- Full name: Mohammed Reza Pourmohammad
- Date of birth: 7 February 1987 (age 39)
- Place of birth: Iran
- Height: 1.74 m (5 ft 9 in)
- Position: Midfielder

Team information
- Current team: F.C. Kheybar Khorramabad
- Number: 7

Senior career*
Years	Team	Apps	(Gls)
2008–2009	Tarbiat	25	(7)
2009–2012	Moghavemat	70	(9)
2012–2013	Mes Sarcheshmeh	22	(1)
2013–2014	Aluminium Hormozgan	15	(3)
2014–2015	Sanat Naft FC	80	(8)
2017–2018	Machine Sazi Tabriz	15	(0)
2017–2018	Gol Reyhan Alborz FC	16	(0)
2018–2019	Mes Rafsanjan	27	(3)
2019–2020	Mes Kerman	30	(2)
2021–2022	Malavan	25	(2)
2022–	F.C. Kheybar Khorramabad	0	(0)
- * Club domestic league appearances and goals as of 3 June 2010 ‡ National team caps and goals as of 6 January 2010

Mohammed Reza Pourmohammad (born 7 February 1987) is an Iranian Football player Kheybar Khorramabad Persian Gulf Pro League.

== Professional ==
Pourmohammad joined Moghavemat Sepasi in 2009.

=== Club Career Statistics ===
Last Update 3 June 2010

Club performance			League		Cup		Continental		Total	
Season	Club	League	Apps	Goals	Apps	Goals	Apps	Goals	Apps	Goals
Iran			League		Hazfi Cup		Asia		Total	
2008–09	Tarbiat	Azadegan League		6			-	-		
2009–10	Moghavemat	Persian Gulf Cup	16	3		0	-	-		3
Total	Iran			9			0	0		
Career total				9			0	0		

- Assist Goals

Season	Team	Assists
09–10	Moghaveemat	0
