= 1996–97 Azadegan League =

6th season of Azadegan League

Azadegan League
- Season: 1996–97
- Champions: Persepolis
- Relegated: Machine Sazi; Malavan; Shamoushak; Keshavarz
- Asian Club Championship: Persepolis
- Asian Cup Winners' Cup: Bargh Shiraz
- Matches: 240
- Top goalscorer: Ali Asghar Modir Roosta 18 (Bahman)
- Biggest home win: Persepolis 5-0 Shamoushak
- Highest scoring: Persepolis 5–3 Malavan

The 1996–97 Azadegan League was the sixth season of the Azadegan League, Iran's top-level professional football league at the time, that was won by the defending champions Persepolis. The following is the final results of the Azadegan League's 1996–97 football season.

== Final classification ==
| Pos | Team | Pld | W | D | L | GF | GA | GD | Pts | Qualification or relegation |
|---|---|---|---|---|---|---|---|---|---|---|
| 1 | Persepolis (C) | 30 | 17 | 8 | 5 | 52 | 24 | +28 | 59 | Qualification for the 1997–98 Asian Club Championship |
| 2 | Bahman | 30 | 15 | 8 | 7 | 49 | 32 | +17 | 53 | |
| 3 | Sepahan | 30 | 14 | 8 | 8 | 37 | 29 | +8 | 50 | |
| 4 | PAS Tehran | 30 | 11 | 15 | 4 | 37 | 22 | +15 | 48 | |
| 5 | Sanat Naft | 30 | 11 | 9 | 10 | 37 | 38 | −1 | 42 | |
| 6 | Esteghlal | 30 | 11 | 8 | 11 | 41 | 39 | +2 | 41 | |
| 7 | Payam Mashhad | 30 | 9 | 13 | 8 | 37 | 37 | 0 | 40 | |
| 8 | Bargh Shiraz | 30 | 11 | 6 | 13 | 26 | 27 | −1 | 39 | Qualification for the 1997–98 Asian Cup Winners Cup |
| 9 | Est. Ahvaz | 30 | 8 | 14 | 8 | 40 | 38 | +2 | 38 | |
| 10 | Zob Ahan | 30 | 7 | 16 | 7 | 30 | 28 | +2 | 37 | |
| 11 | Polyacryl | 30 | 9 | 10 | 11 | 31 | 32 | −1 | 37 | |
| 12 | Tractor Sazi | 30 | 8 | 13 | 9 | 28 | 29 | −1 | 37 | |
| 13 | Machine Sazi (R) | 30 | 10 | 5 | 15 | 30 | 52 | −22 | 35 | Relegation to 1997–98 Iran 2nd Division |
| 14 | Malavan (R) | 30 | 8 | 9 | 13 | 35 | 43 | −8 | 33 | Relegation to 1997–98 Iran 2nd Division |
| 15 | Shamoushak (R) | 30 | 8 | 8 | 14 | 34 | 52 | −18 | 32 | Relegation to 1997–98 Iran 2nd Division |
| 16 | Keshavarz (R) | 30 | 3 | 10 | 17 | 19 | 41 | −22 | 19 | Relegation to 1997–98 Iran 2nd Division |

Source: RSSSF
(C) Champions; (R) Relegated

== Summary ==
- Iranian football champions: Persepolis
- Relegated: Machine Sazi, Malavan, Shamoushak, Keshavarz
- Promoted: Fajr Sepasi, Saipa, Foolad, Shahrdari Tabriz

== Player statistics ==
=== Top goal scorers ===
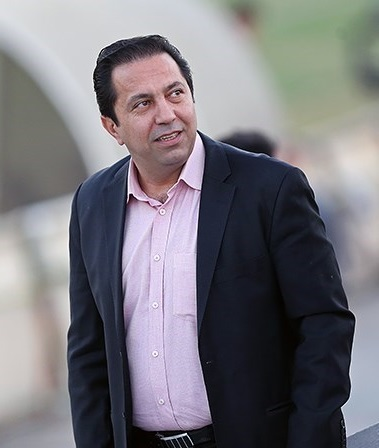
Ali Asghar Modir Roosta

18

- Ali Asghar Modir Roosta (Bahman)
