= Zagros Yasouj F.C. =

Iranian football club

Shahrdari Yasuj F.C.
- Full name: Shardari Yasuj Football Club
- Founded: 2009; 9 years ago
- Ground: Takhti Stadium; Yasuj; Iran
- Chairman: Ali Norouzi
- League: 3rd Division
- 2014–15: 2nd Division Group C, 9th (relegated)
Home colours	Away colours

Shahrdari Yasuj Football Club is an Iranian football club based in Yasuj, Iran. They currently compete in the Iran Football's 2nd Division.

== History ==
Shahrdari Yasuj Football Club was founded in 2009, in their first year the team placed second in their grouping, gaining promotion to the Azadegan League.

In 2012, they historically beat Iran Pro League side Mes Kerman 4–1 in the Hazfi Cup to advance to the round of 16.

== Season-by-season ==
The table below chronicles the achievements of the club in various competitions.

Season	League	Position	Hazfi Cup
2009–10	2nd Division	1st	Second Round
2010–11	Azadegan League	3rd	1/4 Final
2011–12	Azadegan League	7th	1/2 Final
2012–13	Azadegan League	4th	1/8 Final
2013–14	Azadegan League	11th	Third Round
2014–15	2nd Division	9th	Third Round

== Players ==
As of July 1, 2013

=== First-team squad ===
Note: Flags indicate national team as defined under FIFA eligibility rules; some limited exceptions apply. Players may hold more than one non-FIFA nationality.

No.	Pos.	Nation	Player
—	MF	(Iran) IRN	Farhad Pourian
—	FW	(Iran) IRN	Mohammad Akbari
—	FW	(Iran) IRN	Javad Zare
—	MF	(Iran) IRN	Alireza Ghasemi
—	MF	(Iran) IRN	Rahim Rahimi
—	MF	(Iran) IRN	Mehrdad Ebtededi
—	FW	(Iran) IRN	Gholamreza Abbasfard
—	MF	(Iran) IRN	Hossein Hejazipour
—	MF	(Iran) IRN	Ali Karami
—	MF	(Nigeria) NGA	Daniel Obizebo

No.	Pos.	Nation	Player
—	GK	(Iran) IRN	Hasan hori
—	MF	(Iran) IRN	Alireza Kordi
—	MF	(Iran) IRN	Mehdi Barvash
—	MF	(Iran) IRN	Khosrow Piroosian
—	FW	(Iran) IRN	Mostafa Cheragi
—	MF	(Iran) IRN	Ghasem Sadeghi
—	DF	(Iran) IRN	Akbar Safari
—	GK	(Iran) IRN	Ali Asadi
—	MF	(Iran) IRN	Sajad Fili
