= Samen Stadium =

Sports venue in Mashhad, Iran

Coordinates: 36°25′33″N 59°23′02″E

Samen ثامن
- Interactive map of Samen ثامن
- Full name: Samen Al-Aeme Stadium
- Location: Mashhad, Iran
- Owner: Ministry of Sport and Youth
- Capacity: 27,000; Capacity history; 35,000 (2004–2020)
- Surface: Grass
- Field size: 105 × 68 m

Construction
- Groundbreaking: 1995
- Built: 1995–2004
- Opened: 2004
- Renovated: 2019–2020

Tenants
- Aboomoslem (2004–2010); Payam (2008–2009); Padideh (2014–2018); Siah Jamegan (2015–2018)

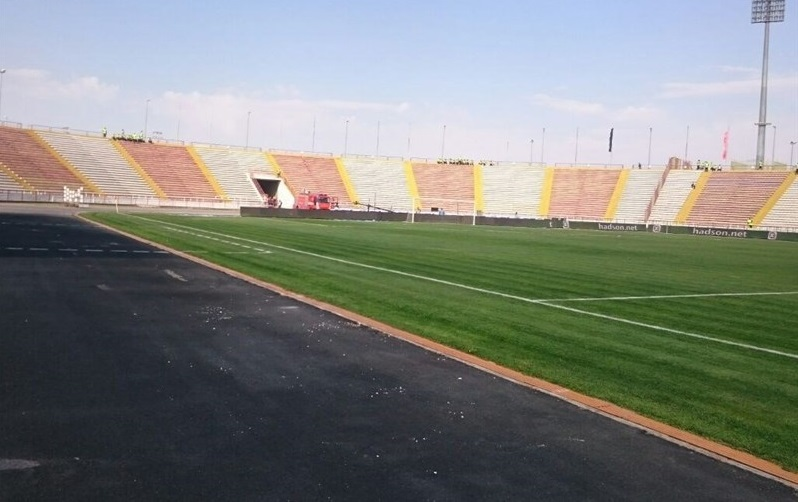
Samen stadium

The Samen Al-Aeme Stadium (Persian: ورزشگاه ثامن الائمه), commonly known as Samen, is a multi-use stadium in Mashhad, Razavi Khorasan, Iran, with a 27,000 seating capacity. The stadium opened in 2004 with a 35,000 capacity and is owned by the Ministry of Sport and Youth. It is the home stadium of Aboomoslem and the former home venue of Payam, Padideh and Siah Jamegan.
