= Seyed Kazem Ghiyassian =

Iranian footballer and manager

Personal information
- Date of birth: February 3, 1957
- Place of birth: Mashhad, Iran
- Date of death: February 13, 2014 (aged 57)
- Place of death: Mashhad, Iran
- Position: Midfielder

Senior career*
Years	Team	Apps	(Gls)
1959–1970	Aboomoslem		
1970–1974	Payam		

Managerial career
- 1990–1995: Aboomoslem
- 2009–2010: Payam
- 2010–2011: Aboomoslem
- 2011: Siah Jamegan
- 2011: Aboomoslem
- * Club domestic league appearances and goals

Seyed Kazem Ghiyassian (Persian: سید كاظم غیاثیان, February 3, 1957 – February 13, 2014) was an Iranian football player and manager. He played for his hometown teams. After retirement as a football player, he managed several clubs, including F.C. Aboomoslem, Payam and Siah Jamegan F.C. He was one of the most experienced football coaches from Mashhad.

== Career ==
He played for F.C. Aboomoslem and Payam throughout the 1980s.

=== Managerial career ===
He has held various coaching positions (assistant manager, head coach, technical manager and vice president) with F.C. Aboomoslem and Payam Mashhad throughout the 1990s.
