= Hadi Bargizar =

Iranian footballer

Personal information
- Full name: Hadi Bargizar
- Date of birth: 1970 (age 55–56)
- Place of birth: Gonbad-e Kavus, Iran
- Position: Midfielder

Senior career*
Years	Team	Apps	(Gls)
- Aboomoslem
- Payam

Managerial career
- 2007–2008: Payam
- 2008–2009: Aboomoslem
- 2009–2010: Payam
- 2010–2012: Etka Gorgan
- 2012–2013: Gostaresh Foolad
- * Club domestic league appearances and goals

Hadi Bargizar (Persian: هادی برگی‌زر) (born 1970 in Gonbad-e Kavus, Iran) is a retired Iranian football player. After he retired he managed several clubs, including F.C. Aboomoslem, Payam Mashhad, Etka Gorgan F.C. and Gostaresh Foolad F.C.

He is an ethnic Turkmen and older brother of Morteza Bargizar. Although he was born in Gonbad-e Kavus, he has lived in Mashhad since his early childhood.

== Playing career ==
He played for F.C. Aboomoslem and Payam Mashhad throughout the 1980s and 1990s. He also represented Khorasan Provincial Team in the 1980s and 1990s at senior and youth levels.

== Managerial career ==
He has coached F.C. Aboomoslem, Payam Mashhad and Etka Gorgan F.C.

== Honours ==
Payam Khorasan

- Azadegan League: 2007–08
