= Payam Khorasan F.C. =

Iranian association football club

Payam Toos Khorasan
- Full name: Payam Toos Khorasan Football Club
- Nicknames: The Greens of Khorasan (Persian: سبز پوشان خراسان, Sibez Pushan Xerasan); Gray Wolves of Tus (Persian: گرگ های خاکستری توس, Gârgahay-e Xakâstri Tus)
- Founded: 1976
- Ground: Samen Stadium; Mashhad; Iran
- Capacity: 27,000
- Chairman: Younes Masoudi
- Head Coach: Seyed Jamal Nematpour
- League: Khorasan Football League
- 2021–22: Iran Football's 2nd Division, 9th
- Website: http://payamtoos.com
Home colours	Away colours	Third colours

Payam Toos Khorasan Football Club (Persian: باشگاه فوتبال پيام توس خراسان, Bashgah-e Futbal-e Peyam Tus Xerasan) is an Iranian football club based in Mashhad, Razavi Khorasan. They compete in the 2nd Division. The club is more commonly known as Payam Mashhad when it was based in Mashhad from 1976 to May 2011. The club was moved to Nishapur from May to November 2011, however due to lack of support in Nishapur, the club moved back to Mashhad. In April 2013 Ali Sheykh Eslami bought Payam Imam Reza Football Club and renamed the club "Payam Vahdat Khorasan Football Club". The re-founded club, Payam Khorasan F.C., was formed in July 2021, taking its name from the year of foundation of the predecessor club and securing a place in the 2020-21 2nd Division. Ex-head coach Younes Masoudi was appointed as president and former player Mohammad Babaei was chosen as head coach.

== History ==
=== Establishment ===
The club was established in 1976 by Ali Shadiyan under the name "Soltan Tabarsi" and participated in the city of Mashhad's youth football leagues. Sometime in 1977, the name of the club changed to Mokhaberat Mashhad when new owner Javad Moradnejad revealed Ministry of Post and Telecommunications as sponsor of the club. In 1983 the club was renamed to Payam.

=== Glory years ===
In 1988, Payam became Khorasan Province Champions and thus made first appearance in Iran's top league Qods League. Payam then once again appeared in the top league for 1994/95.

After relegation in 1995, once again appeared in the top league and for first time ever two seasons back-to-back 1996/97 and 1997/98. Payam's team of 1996/97 is considered the golden team in Payam's history. In these years the team was coached by the great Majid Jalali and in addition to local star players such as Reza Sahebi, Majid Hosseinipour, Mehdi Vaezi, Ali Hanteh, several Iran national football team players and other star players featured for Payam including Nima Nakisa, Sattar Hamedani, Dariush Yazdani, Behzad Dadashzadeh, Shahram Baratpouri, Ali Chini and Ahmad Momenzadeh. However it got relegated at the end of 1997/98 season.

=== Iran Pro League ===
The club was promoted to the Persian Gulf Cup for the 2008–09 season and had a difficult season where they changed chairman three times and three coaches and had financial problems during the season. They finally lost the battle to their city rivals Aboomoslem and were relegated to the Azadegan League again.

=== Relocation to Nishapur ===
Due to the club's financial crisis, the club was docked three points at the end of the 2010–11 Azadegan League season and thus was relegated to 2nd Division. Parliamentarians and industries in Nishapur had promised financial support and a strong fan base if the team moved. Mahmoud Safaei chairman of the club decided to move the club to Nishapur. This move which lasted only six months from May 2011 to November 2011 was a disaster as the team did not receive the promised support, thus Khorasan Razavi FA took over ownership of the club and returned the club back to Mashhad.

=== Bankruptcy ===
In 2012, the club was unable to pay wages and had debts. The club's owner, Mahmoud Safaei, was able to raise some more money, but even this soon proved to be insufficient resources to sustain the club. Payam Mashhad were relegated to 3rd Division at the end of the 2011–12 season. This form of bankruptcy meant that the club was refused a place in 3rd Division for the 2012–13 season, and as a result effectively ceased to exist.

=== Refounded ===
At the beginning of the summer of 2013-14 season, Majid Khorrami bought the franchise of Esteghlal Sari football club and gave life to this old and popular name of Mashhad and entered the second division league under the name Payam Vahdat Khorasan Football Club with the financial support of Atrak Air. In the second group of the competition, among 14 teams, it did not get a better than 8th rank. Next season, with the support of Mahan Air, in the 2014-2015 Iran Football League Second Division, the first stage (second group) of the games, it won the sixth place in a situation where it was the half-season champion and failed to advance to the final stage to advance to the Azadegan League. In start season 2015-16 with the disagreement between the club owner Majid Khorami and Ali Sheikhul-Islami, the management of the club was removed and Payam Vahdat to Kashmar made the team into the third league and its quota was sold to Persepolis Mashhad.

=== Payam Toos ===
At the beginning of 2021, a campaign was created on Instagram and Telegram to revive the Payam club with the efforts of Qutb The Greens of Khorasan fans and Younes Masoudi, the former captain of this team, which led to the establishment of the Payam club this time with the original name of Payam Toos Khorasan. The two companies of Tybad pipe and profile and Epoxy sleep goods are the financial sponsors and The Greens of Khorasan entered the competition by buying the points of Omid Ganaveh from Bushehr province under the guidance of Mohammad Babaei, one of the famous coaches of Mashhad and a former player of Payam.After 9 weeks, Mohammad Babaei resigned and was replaced by Hassan Sorouri, and he was dismissed after 9 matches due to poor results, and until the end of the 2021–22 season, Abbas Sharif, one of Payam's base coaches, temporarily became the helmsman of Khorasani Greens until he who was the head coach of this team in the last 7 weeks, finished the season by finishing ninth in the table among the fourteen teams of the first group of the second division league of Iranian clubs.

At the end of the 2021-2022 season, Payam Toos Khorasan's quota was sold to Kian Sam Babol with the decision of its ownership.

== Khorasan Derby ==
The Mashhad derby also known as the Khorasan derby is a local football derby match between the two most popular clubs from Mashhad: Aboomoslem and Payam. Back in the 1980s and early 1990s it was Iran's second most important derby after the Tehran derby. Nowadays it has lost its status to more popular derbies such as Esfahan derby, and the Ahvaz derby.

== Payam Football Academy ==
Payam Football Academy was established on 16 April 2010, commenced work in June 2010 with 16 trainers and executive personnel. Team's captain Younes Masoudi was CEO of Payam Football Academy from June 2010 until May 2010.

== Name history ==
The club has mostly been owned by Ministry of Post and Telecommunications. until 2007. However, throughout history, the team changed sponsors and thus was known by many names.

- Soltan Tabarsi (1976–1977) – founded by Ali Shadiyan of Tabarsi Street in Mashhad.
- Mokhaberat Mashhad (1977–1983) – owned by Javad Moradnejad & sponsored by Ministry of Post and Telecommunications.
- Payam Mashhad (1983–1991) – in 1990/91 period Chelokabab Rezaei Restaurant was major sponsor.
- Payam Chin Chin Mashhad (1990–1991)- in 1990/91 period Chin Chin Company was major sponsor.
- Payam Azadegan Mashhad (1991–1992)
- Payam Gach Khorasan (1992–1996) – major sponsor was Khorasan Gypsum Ltd.
- Payam Moghavemat Mashhad (1996–1998) – major sponsor was Islamic Revolutionary Guard Corps
- Payam Mokhaberat Mashhad (1998–2000)
- Payam Peykan Mashhad (2000–2003) – major sponsor was Iran Khodro and club was managed by Paykan Tehran F.C.
- Payam Post Mashhad (2003–2005) – major sponsor was Iran Post
- Payam Ertebatat Mashhad (2005–2007)
- Payam Mi Si Noo (2007) – briefly from July to December 2007, Payam Soccer Team was owned by Mehregan Sharq Cultural and Sport Club.
- Payam Khorasan Razavi (2008–2010)
- Payam Imam Reza (2010–2012)
- Payam Vahdat Khorasan (2013–2016)
- Payam Toos Khorasan (2021–Present)

== Club stadium ==
Before the construction of Samen Al-Aeme Stadium, Payam played all of its matches at Takhti Stadium (Mashhad), which currently has a capacity of 15,000. They occasionally play big games at Samen Al-Aeme Stadium.

== Sponsors ==
Since establishment to present day, sponsors of the club have included Ministry of Post and Telecommunications, Iran Khodro, Basij, Toos Gypsum Co, Iran Post, Dariush Grand Hotel, Chin Chin Company, Chelokabab Rezaei Restaurant and Tabarrok Rice.

== Head coaches ==
- Hashem Rahbardar (1976–77)
- Javad Moradnejad (1977–82)
- Khademolreza (1982–83)
- Javad Qorab (1983–84)
- Qasem Zardkanloo (1984–85)
- Hashem Rahbardar (1985)
- Qasem Zardkanloo (1985–86)
- Hashem Rahbardar (1986–1989)
- Qasem Zardkanloo (1990)
- Hashem Rahbardar (1990–91)
- Qasem Zardkanloo (1991–92)
- Hasan Ghasemi (1992–93)
- Seyed Mehdi Qiyassi (1993–94)
- Seyed Kazem Ghiyassian (1994–95)
- Mehdi Dinvarzadeh (1995–96)
- Majid Jalali (1996–98)
- Hossein Fekri (1998)
- Qasem Zardkanloo (1999)
- Akbar Misaghian (1999–02)
- Reza Vatankhah (2002–04)
- Nader Dastneshan (2004–05)
- Abbas Chamanyan (2005)
- Morteza Vahedolein
- Faraz Kamalvand (2005–06)
- Hashem Rahbardar (2006–07)
- Abbas Chamanyan (2007)
- Seyed Ali Hoseini (14 November 2007–10 December 07) (Caretaker)
- Ali Hanteh (11 December 2007-8 March 08)
- Hamed Khoshnevis (9 March 2008–21 June 08)
- Mojtaba Asghari (22 June 2008–12 December 08)
- Abbas Chamanyan (18 December 2008 – January 9)
- Rahim Tajik (January 2009 – February 9)
- Seyed Kazem Ghiyassian (February 2009 – May 9)
- Ali Hanteh (July 2009 – March 10)
- Davoud Mahabadi (March 2010 – June 10)
- Reza Sahebi (June 2010–22 July 10)
- Abbas Chamanyan (23 July 2010–20 February 11)
- ALi Kafi (20 February 2011 – 10 March 2011)
- Abbas Chamanian (11 March 2011 – June 2011)
- Reza Ahadi (19 June 2011 – July 2011)
- Abbas Dehghani (July 2011 – October 2011)
- Abbas Chamanian (November 2011) (Caretaker)
- Reza Sahebi (November 2011 – December 2011)
- Abbas Dehghani (January 2012 – 2013)
- Hashem Rahbardar (June 2013 – February 2014)
- Abbas Akbari (February 2014 – August 2014)
- Yousef Naderian (August 2014 –July 2015)
- Abbas Chamanian (July 2015–October 2015)
- Abbas Chamanian (October 2015–January 2016)
- Ali Bakhshi (January 2016-January 2017)
- Hamid Tahmasbi (January 2017)
- Mohammad Babaei (July 2021–January 2022)
- Hassan Sourouri (January 2022–April 2022)
- Abbas Sharif (April 2022–June 2022)
- Seyed Ali Hashemi (June 2024–present)

== Season-by-season ==
The table below chronicles the achievements of Payam Mashhad in various competitions since 1984.

Season	Division	League	Position	Hazfi Cup	Notes
1984–1985	2	Mashhad Football League's 2nd Div.	1st	Not held	Promoted to the Mashhad Football League
1985–1986	1	Mashhad Football League	3rd	Not held
1986–1987	1	Khorasan Football League	1st	Not held
1987–1988	1	Khorasan Football League	2nd	1/16 Final
1988–1989	1	Khorasan Football League	1st	1/8 Final	Promoted to the Qods League
1989–1990	1	Qods League	9th	Second Round
1990–91	2	2nd Division	4th
1991–92	2	2nd Division	7th	Not held
1992–93	2	2nd Division	11th	Not held
1993–94	2	2nd Division	4th	Second Round	Promoted to the Azadegan League
1994–95	1	Azadegan League	10th	First Round	Relegated to the Iran Football's 2nd Division
1995–96	2	2nd Division	1st	Second Round	Promoted to the Azadegan League
1996–97	1	Azadegan League	7th	Second Round
1997–98	1	Azadegan League	14th	Not held	Relegated to the Iran Football's 2nd Division
1998–99	2	2nd Division	4th	Second Round
1999-00	2	2nd Division	7th	Third Round
2000–01	2	2nd Division	3rd
2001–02	2	Azadegan League	6th	Second Round
2002–03	2	Azadegan League	4th	Second Round
2003–04	2	Azadegan League	6th	Third Round
2004–05	2	Azadegan League	2nd	First Round
2005–06	2	Azadegan League	10th	Second Round
2006–07	2	Azadegan League	9th	Third Round
2007–08	2	Azadegan League	1st	1/16 Final	Promoted to the Persian Gulf Cup
2008–09	1	Persian Gulf Cup	16th	1/8 Final	Relegated to the Azadegan League
2009–10	2	Azadegan League	8th	Third Round
2010–11	2	Azadegan League	13th	1/16 Final	Relegated to the Iran Football's 2nd Division
2011–12	3	2nd Division	13th	First Round	Relegated to the Iran Football's 3rd Division
2012–13	4	3rd Division	Did not enter		Replaced to the Iran Football's 2nd Division
2013–14	3	2nd Division	8th	Did not enter
2014–15	3	2nd Division	6th	Fourth Round
2015–16	3	2nd Division	8th	Second Round	Relegated to the Iran Football's 3rd Division
2016–17	4	3rd Division	Did not enter		Relegated to the Iran Football's 3rd Division
2017–18	5	Khorasan Football League	Absence		Relegated to the Khorasan Football League's 2nd Div.
2018–19	6	Khorasan Football League's 2nd Div.	Absence		Relegated to the Mashhad Football League
2019–20	7	Mashhad Football League	Absence		Relegated to the Mashhad Football League's 2nd Div.
2020–21	8	Mashhad Football League's 2nd Div.	Absence		Replaced to the Iran Football's 2nd Division
2021–22	3	2nd Division	9th	Second Round

== Honours ==
- Mashhad Football League

Runner-Up: 1985–86

- Khorasan Football League

Champion (5): 1986–87, 1988–89, 1991–92, 1994–95, 1999–2000
Runner-Up: 1987–88

- 2nd Division

Runner-Up: 1995–96

- Azadegan League

Champion (1): 2007–08
2nd Group B: 2004–05

== Players ==
=== First-team squad ===
The composition of the team in the season 2021–22 Note: The flags represent the national team as defined by FIFA eligibility rules. Players may have more than one non-FIFA nationality.

=== First-team squad ===
Note: Flags indicate national team as defined under FIFA eligibility rules; some limited exceptions apply. Players may hold more than one non-FIFA nationality.

No.	Pos.	Nation	Player
1	GK	IRN	Majid Aalaeinejad (Captain)
2	DF	IRN	Alireza Zaal
3	DF	IRN	Seyed Younes Alavi
4	DF	IRN	Mohammad Taghizadeh
5	DF	IRN	Saeed Asgharpour (3rd Captain)
6	MF	IRN	Sadegh Nikfar
7	MF	IRN	Mehdi Sahraei
8	MF	IRN	Mehdi Khaghani
9	FW	IRN	Reza Fateh
10	MF	IRN	Salar Afrasiabi (Vice Captain)
11	FW	IRN	Ehsan Mahroughi
12	MF	IRN	Omid Sedaghat^{U21}
13	MF	IRN	Amir Mokhtari^{U21}
14	MF	IRN	Younes Karimi^{U23}
15	FW	IRN	Mehdi Daneshkhah^{U21}
16	DF	IRN	Mohammadreza Aram^{U21}
17	MF	IRN	Seyed Amir Moradi

No.	Pos.	Nation	Player
18	GK	IRN	Younes Namazi^{U23}
19	DF	IRN	Reza Rahimi
20	MF	IRN	Mehdi Najafi^{U23}
21	FW	IRN	Naser Torabi
22	GK	IRN	Seyed Ali Moosavi (4th Captain)
23	MF	IRN	AmirAli Alizadeh^{U23}
24	FW	IRN	Ali Ghafarian^{U21}
25	MF	IRN	Behnam Foroutan^{U21}
26	MF	IRN	Soheil Rashidi^{U19}
27	MF	IRN	Amirhossein Mahmoudi^{U21}
33	FW	IRN	Hadi Kianpour^{U23}
72	FW	IRN	Sadegh Hakimi
73	MF	IRN	Sasan Rajabzadeh
77	MF	IRN	Hamed Asadpour
88	MF	IRN	Amirhossein Talebnejad
95	FW	IRN	Sohrab Fakhrabadi
99	MF	IRN	Hossein Shaji^{U23}

For recent transfers, see List of Iranian football transfers winter 2021–22.

=== Technical staff ===
Position	Staff
Manager	Abbas Sharif
First-team coach	Rohollah Bahrami
Assistant coaches	Amir Kian Mohammadi
Fitness coach	Amin Ghelichi
Assistant Goalkeeping coach	Hossein Hooshyar
