= Ali Hanteh =

Iranian footballer (born 1966)

Masoud Hanteh
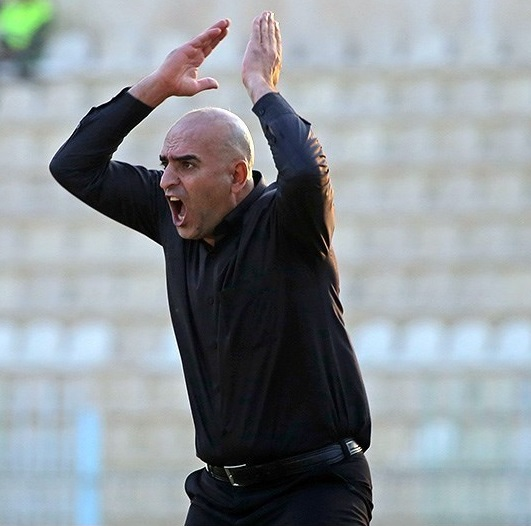

Personal information
- Full name: Masoud Ali Hanteh
- Date of birth: November 10, 1966 (age 59)
- Place of birth: Mashhad, Iran
- Position: Striker

Senior career*
Years	Team	Apps	(Gls)
1980–1997	Aboomoslem		
1997–1998	Payam Mashhad		
1998–1999	Aboomoslem		

Managerial career
- 1997–1999: Fajr Khorasan
- 1999–2002: Tarbiat Khorasan
- 2007: Payam Mashhad
- 2008–2009: Aboomoslem
- 2009–2010: Payam Mashhad
- 2010: Aboomoslem
- 2010–2011: Mehrkam Pars
- 2011: Aboomoslem
- 2012: Shahrdari Arak
- 2012–2013: Esteghlal Ahvaz
- 2013–2014: Aboomoslem
- 2015: Esteghlal Ahvaz
- 2018: Siah Jamegan
- * Club domestic league appearances and goals

Masoud Ali Hanteh (born November 10, 1966) is a retired Iranian football player. He is currently free agent. His latest job was to be the manager of Esteghlal Ahvaz in Iran Pro League.

== Playing career ==
He played for Aboomoslem back in 1980s, then joined Payam Mashhad for 1997–98 season before returning to F.C. Aboomoslem for 1998–99 season. He also represented Khorasan Provincial Team in the 1980s at senior and youth levels.

== Managerial career ==
After retirement Hanteh coached Fajr Khorasan. He then coached a Khorasan League 2nd Division team Tarbiyat Khorasan and made the team promoted to 1st Division. He has been assistant coach at F.C. Aboomoslem for several years under Akbar Misaghian, Firouz Karimi and Farhad Kazemi.
