= F.C. Aboomoslem Khorasan =

Iranian football club

Abu Muslim ابومسلم
- Full name: Football Club Abu Muslim
- Nicknames: Black Pearl (Persian: مرواريد سياه, Morvarid-e Siyah)
- Founded: 1970; 56 years ago
- Dissolved: 2016
- Ground: Samen Stadium; Mashhad; Iran
- Capacity: 27,000
- Website: www.aboumoslem.ir
Home colours	Away colours	Third colours

Football Club Abu Muslim (Persian: باشگاه فوتبال ابومسلم خراسان, Bashgah-e Futbal-e Abumislâm-e Xorasan), commonly known as Abu Muslim, was an Iranian football club based in Mashhad, Razavi Khorasan. The club was founded in 1970 and is named after Abbasid-era Persian general Abu Muslim, who led the Abbasid Revolution that toppled the Umayyad dynasty.

The football team played its home games at the Samen Stadium which has a seating capacity of 27,000. The club is owned and supported by Mohammad Reza Abbasi.

Abu Muslim won four League 2 trophies, three Khorasan League titles, and one final participation in the Hazfi Cup. Abu Muslim holds a long-standing enmity with provincial rivals Payam Khorasan known as the Mashhad derby.

== History ==
=== Establishment ===
In 1970 a group of football players from Mashhad decided to create a new football team by the name of Abu Muslim. After defeat in the tournament, it was decided that for Khorasan to have a powerful football team, Abu Muslim and Aria must merge. Three brothers helped to merge the clubs, and Abu Muslim was able to make it to the 1975 Takht Jamshid Cup, which was the top football league in Iran before the Iranian revolution. The team originally only wore black, but red was added late on. Success was short lived and the team was relegated the next season, staying in the 2nd division until the revolution.

=== Post Revolution ===
Like most sporting clubs in Iran, the revolution and the Iran–Iraq War severely limited the team's activities. From 1980 to 1984 the club participated in almost no meaningful competitions. This changed when in late 1984 local and provincial leagues were set up. In the late 1980s, Shahdiran Inc. sponsored the team. After the war the local and provincial leagues were scrapped in favor of nationwide leagues.

Abu Muslim made it to the newly established Azadegan League and participated during the 1990–91 and 1991–92 seasons, but was relegated after only two years. Once relegated the club struggled dramatically, being relegated all the way to the third division, which was a local league. Shahdiran stopped sponsoring the team and was replaced by soft drink company, Khoshgovar. After several seasons in the lower leagues, Abu Muslim finally made it back to the top level of Iranian football, gaining promotion to the Azadegan League during the 1997–98 season. Abu Muslim had been in a poor financial situation that season, as Khoshgovar had stopped being its sponsor. Abu Muslim's only revenue came from advertisements and support from club fans, but surprisingly won promotion. Abu Muslim again only stayed in the league for two seasons and was relegated during the 1999–2000 season. Around the same time the club went back to its roots, once again being sponsored by the Iranian police.

=== Iran Pro League ===
They were promoted again in the next season and debuted in Iran's first fully professional league, the IPL, for the 2001–02 season. They have remained in the IPL since with two 5th-place finishes being their best results. After the 2004–05 season Abu Muslim's new sponsor became Iran Khodro.

=== Recent ===
In 2006 Khodadad Azizi joined the club as an advisor, after retirement from playing. Akbar Misaghian the club's manager for the past two seasons resigned after the first week of the 2006–07 season due to financial disagreements with management. In January 2007, Khodadad Azizi was named manager of Abu Muslim. He was sacked less than a year later and replaced by Parviz Mazloomi in October 2007. The club had a very difficult season which they avoided the relegation in the last week and changed three head coaches and three chairmen but their instability continued for the 2009–10 season where they finished last and got relegated. In 2014 for the first time in the club's history the team was relegated to the 2nd Division.

=== Bankruptcy ===
Because of the financial problems suffered by the club, On 7 September 2014 the Ministry of Youth Affairs and Sports declared the bankruptcy of F.C. Abu Muslim. The new chairman Mehdi Biglari re-established the club in 2014 as Toloe Nasl e Abu Muslim Football Club. Abu Muslim restarted operations in 2016 and started competing in the fourth tier.

== Mashhad Derby ==
The Mashhad derby also known as the Khorasan derby is a football local derby match between F.C. Abu Muslim and Payam Khorasan. Nowadays it has lost its status to more popular derbies such as Esfahan derby, Ahvaz derby and Shiraz derby.

== Stadium ==
The club currently plays in Samen Stadium after years of playing in Mashhad's Takhti Stadium. The club announced plans to construct their own stadium with the help of the provincial government. The land was awarded to the team during Karim Malahi's time as club chairman. Construction was planned to begin March 2007 in the Elahieh area of Mashhad.

== Supporters ==
=== Fan base ===
Abu Muslim is the most popular club from Khorasan.

=== Famous fans ===
- Mohammad Bagher Ghalibaf – Mayor of Tehran
- Reza Ghoochannejhad – Football player for Iran national football team and Heerenveen.

== Season-by-season ==
The table below chronicles the achievements of Abu Muslim in various competitions.

Season	Division	League	Position	Hazfi Cup	Notes
1973–1974	2	2nd Division	7th	Not held
1974–1975	2	2nd Division	1st	Not held	Promoted
1975–1976	1	Takht Jamshid Cup	5th	1/16 Final
1976–1977	1	Takht Jamshid Cup	16th	1/8 Final	Relegated
1977–1978	2	2nd Division	1st	Not held	Promoted
1978–1979	1	Takht Jamshid Cup	Did not finish	Not held
1979–1984		Not held	Not held
1984–1985	1	Mashhad Football League	1st	Not held
1985–1986	1	Mashhad Football League	1st	Not held
1987–1988	1	Khorasan Football League	1st	1/16 Final
1988–1989	1	Khorasan Football League	2nd	1/8 Final
1989–1990	1	Khorasan Football League	1st	Did not qualify	Promoted
1990–1991	2	2nd Division	1st	1/8 Final	Promoted
1991–1992	1	Azadegan League	12th	Not held
1992–1993	1	Azadegan League	8th	Not held	Relegated
1993–1994	3	Khorasan Football League	1st	Did not qualify	Promoted
1994–1995	2	2nd Division	4th	Did not qualify
1995–1996	2	2nd Division	3rd	Second round
1996–1997	2	2nd Division	5th	Second round
1997–1998	2	2nd Division	4th	Not held	Promoted
1998–1999	1	Azadegan League	8th	1/8 Final
1999–2000	1	Azadegan League	11th	1/16 Final	Relegated
2000–2001	2	2nd Division	1st	1/16 Final	Promoted
2001–2002	1	Iran Pro League	5th	1/8 Final
2002–2003	1	Iran Pro League	12th
2003–2004	1	Iran Pro League	10th	1/8 Final
2004–2005	1	Iran Pro League	8th	Final
2005–2006	1	Iran Pro League	5th	1/8 Final
2006–2007	1	Iran Pro League	6th
2007–2008	1	Iran Pro League	4th	1/16 Final
2008–2009	1	Iran Pro League	15th	1/16 Final
2009–2010	1	Iran Pro League	17th	1/8 Final	Relegated
2010–2011	2	Azadegan League	5th	2nd round
2011–2012	2	Azadegan League	6th	1/8 Final
2012–2013	2	Azadegan League	6th	1/4 Final
2013–2014	2	Azadegan League	12th	Third round	Relegated
2014–2015	3	2nd Division	6th	Fourth round
2015–2016	3	2nd Division	10th	First round	Relegated
2016–2017	4	3rd Division	8th		Relegated
2017–2018	4	3rd Division	5th		Relegated

== Club chairmen ==
- Heshmat Mohajerani
- Hadi Khayami
- Amir Sharifian
- Bagher Sayammi
- Jahangir Sadehdel
- Hamid Tayebbi
- Mahmoud Haj Rezapour
- Rahman Naderi
- Gholam Hossein Takaffoli
- Gholam Reza Basiripour
- Nasser Shafagh
- Mahdi Najami
- Karim Malahi (1996–06)
- Nasser Shafagh (2006–08)
- Mostafa Bani-Asad (2008–09)
- Hossein Ghasemi (2009–10)
- Esmaeil Vafaei (2010–2014)
- Mehdii Biglari (2014–present)

== Club managers ==
- (Iran) Seyed Mehdi Qiyassi (1974)
- (Iran) Abbas Razavi (1974)
- (Romania) Ştefan Stănculescu (1974)
- (Iran) Seyed Mehdi Qiyassi (1974–1986)
- (Iran) Seyed Kazem Ghiyassian (c.early 1990s)
- (Iran) ALI BONYADI (1995–96)
- (Iran) Mehdi Dinvarzadeh (1996–97)
- (Iran) Akbar Misaghian (1997–99)
- (Iran) Farhad Kazemi (2000–01)
- (Iran) Firouz Karimi (2001–02)
- (Iran) Mahmoud Yavari (2002–03)
- (Iran) Akbar Misaghian (2003–06)
- (Iran) Mehdi Ghiasi (2006)
- (Iran) Khodadad Azizi (2006–07)
- (Iran) Parviz Mazloomi (2007–08)
- (Iran) Akbar Misaghian (2008)
- (Iran) Hadi Bargizar (2008)
- (Iran) Amir Hossein Peyrovani (2008)
- (Iran) Ali Hanteh (2008–09)
- (Iran) Naser Pourmehdi (2009)
- (Iran) Farhad Kazemi (2009–10)
- (Iran) Nader Dastneshan (2010)
- (Iran) Majid Namjoo-Motlagh (2010)
- (Iran) Asghar Sadri (2010)
- (Iran) Seyed Kazem Ghiyassian (2010–11)
- (Iran) Ali Hanteh (2011)
- (Iran) Seyed Kazem Ghiyassian (2011)
- (Iran) Khodadad Azizi (2011–12)
- (Iran) Gholam Hossein Peyrovani (2012)
- (Iran) Hadi Bargizar (2012–13)
- (Iran) Ali Hanteh (2013–2014)
- (Iran) Saeed Josheshi (2014–)

== Honours ==
=== Club honours ===
==== League ====
- 2nd Division
  - Champions (4): 1974–75, 1977–78, 1990–91, 2000–01
- Khorasan Football League
  - Champions (5): 1985–86, 1987–88, 1989–90, 1990–91, 1993–94
  - Runners-up (1): 1988–89
- Mashhad Football League
  - Champions (2): 1984–85, 1985–86

==== Cup ====
- Hazfi Cup:
  - Runners-up (1): 2004–05
- AK Pipe International Cup:
  - Champions (1): 2001

=== Individual honours ===
top scorers in Iranian League

Season	Player	Goals
1998–99	(Iran) Abduljalil Golcheshmeh	14
2001–02	(Iran) Reza Enayati	17
2006–07	(Nigeria) Daniel Olerum	17

== Players ==
As of 10 September 2013:

=== First-team squad ===
Note: Flags indicate national team as defined under FIFA eligibility rules; some limited exceptions apply. Players may hold more than one non-FIFA nationality.

No.	Pos.	Nation	Player
—	DF	IRI	Mohsen Neysani
—	DF	IRI	Mehdi Kiani
—	DF	IRI	Meisam Khosravi
—	DF	IRI	Mohammad Rostami
—	DF	IRI	Bijan Koushki
—	DF	IRI	Seyed Mohammad Hosseini (captain)
—	MF	IRI	Hadi Jafari
—		IRI	Mohammad Ahmadpour
—	MF	IRI	Ali Haghdoost
—	MF	IRI	Mohammad Mansouri
—	MF	IRI	Hamid Sharafi
—	MF	IRI	Farzad Hamidi
—	MF	IRI	Davoud Daneshdoost

No.	Pos.	Nation	Player
—		IRI	Mohammad Ghahreman
—		IRI	Mohammad Gholipour
—		IRI	Amir Mohebbi
—		IRI	Ali Molayi
—		IRI	Mostafa Bijani
—		IRI	Ali Nademi (U23)
—		IRI	Vahid Jalali (U23)
—		IRI	Adel Sarshar (U23)
—		IRI	Jamil Zobeidavi (U23)
—		IRI	Farzad Khanifar (U23)
—		IRI	saeid emarloo (U23)
—		IRI	Saeed Jalalian (U23)

For recent transfers, see List of Iranian football transfers winter 2013–14.

=== Former players ===
For details on former players, see Category:Aboomoslem players.

=== Aboomoslem Players at major tournaments ===
The following players were selected for their national teams for major tournaments while playing for Aboomoslem:

Cup	Players
(Iran) 1976 AFC Asian Cup	(Iran) Mehdi Asgarkhani
(Jordan) 2000 WAFF Championship	(Iran) Hamid Reza Ebrahimi
(Argentina) 2001 FIFA World Youth Championship	(Iran) Ershad Yousefi
(Syria) 2002 WAFF Championship	(Iran) Reza Enayati
(Saudi Arabia) 2005 Islamic Solidarity Games	(Iran) Fereydoon Fazli (Iran) Mojtaba Jabbari (Iran) Andranik Teymourian
(Germany) 2006 FIFA World Cup	(Iran) Andranik Teymourian
