= 2000–01 Esteghlal F.C. season =

Esteghlal F.C.
2000–01 season
- President: Ali Fathollahzadeh
- Head coach: Mansour Pourheidari
- Stadium: Azadi Stadium
- Azadegan League: Champions
- Hazfi Cup: Semifinals
- Asian Cup Winners' Cup: 4th
- Top goalscorer: Ali Samereh (14)
Home colours	Away colours

The 2000–01 season are the Esteghlal Football Club's 9th season in the Azadegan League, and their 7th consecutive season in the top division of Iranian football. They are also competing in the Hazfi Cup and Asian Cup Winners' Cup, and 56th year in existence as a football club.

== Player ==
As of 1 September 2001.

Note: Flags indicate national team as defined under FIFA eligibility rules; some limited exceptions apply. Players may hold more than one non-FIFA nationality.

No.	Pos.	Nation	Player
1	GK	IRI	Parviz Boroumand
6	DF	IRI	Mahmoud Fekri
8	MF	IRI	Mohammad Navazi
12	MF	IRI	Mojahed Khaziravi
14	MF	IRI	Sirous Dinmohammadi
15	MF	IRI	Farzad Majidi
16	FW	IRI	Alireza Akbarpour
17	FW	IRI	Ahmad Momenzadeh
20	DF	IRI	Mehdi Hasheminasab
—	DF	IRI	Arastou Mohammadi
22	MF	IRI	Alireza Nikbakht
24	MF	AZE	Rufat Quliyev

No.	Pos.	Nation	Player
—	GK	IRI	Masoud Ghasemi
30	GK	IRI	Hadi Tabatabaei
25	MF	IRI	Behzad Dadashzadeh
23	DF	IRI	Mohammad Reza Mahdavi
2	DF	IRI	Javad Zarincheh
7	MF	IRI	Sattar Hamedani
10	MF	IRI	Dariush Yazdani
18	FW	IRI	Ali Samereh
19	FW	IRI	Bahman Tahmasebi
9	FW	IRI	Ali Latifi
11	FW	IRI	Farhad Majidi
—	FW	IRI	Mehdi Salehpour

== Pre-season and friendlies ==
Partizan (Federal Republic of Yugoslavia)	1 – 1	(Iran) Esteghlal	Kingdom of Yugoslavia

Napredak Kruševac (Federal Republic of Yugoslavia)	1 – 1	(Iran) Esteghlal	Kingdom of Yugoslavia
Farhad Majidi

Al-Nasr (United Arab Emirates)	2 – 6	(Iran) Esteghlal	Dubai, United Arab Emirates
Farhad Majidi		Farzad Majidi; Ali Mousavi; Alireza Akbarpour; Sirous Dinmohammadi	Stadium: Al-Maktoum Stadium

Esteghlal Kashan	0 – 5	Esteghlal	Kashan
		Bahman Tahmasebi; Afshin Hajipour; Alireza Akbarpour; Ali Latifi; Mohammad Niksirat	Stadium: Shahid Naser Fekfi Stadium

Esteghlal	3 – 0	basij Khazaneh	Tehran
Ali Latifi; Dariush Yazdani; Mohammad Niksirat			Stadium: Marghoubkar Stadium

Vahdat Abadan	2 – 2	Esteghlal
		Ali Samereh; Alireza Akbarpour

Sepidrood	0 – 4	Esteghlal	Rasht
		Rufat Quliyev; Mehdi Salehpour; Bahman Tahmasebi; Behzad Dadashzadeh	Stadium: Shahid Dr. Azodi Stadium

Esteghlal	1 – 1	Esteghlal Novin	Tehran
			Stadium: Marghoubkar Stadium

== Competitions ==
=== Overview ===
Competition	Started round	Current position / round	Final position / round	First match	Last match
Azadegan League	—	—	Winner	4 August 2000	19 April 2001
Hazfi Cup	1/8 finals	—	Semifinals		26 June 2001
Asian Cup Winners' Cup	—	—	4th	14 September 2000	19 May 2001

Updated to match played 13 October 2018
Source: Competitions

=== Azadegan League ===
==== Standings ====
Pos	Team	Pld	W	D	L	GF	GA	GD	Pts	Qualification
1	Esteghlal (C)	22	15	5	2	52	21	+31	50	Qualification for the 2001–02 Asian Club Championship
2	Persepolis	22	13	7	2	36	16	+20	46	
3	Saipa	22	8	9	5	29	27	+2	33	
4	Zob Ahan	22	7	9	6	30	22	+8	30	
5	Paykan	22	7	7	8	19	29	−10	28	

Updated to match(es) played on 1 September 2018. Source: RSSSF
Rules for classification: 1) Points; 2) Goal difference; 3) Goals scored.
(C) Champions

==== Results summary ====
Overall								Home						Away					
Pld	W	D	L	GF	GA	GD	Pts	W	D	L	GF	GA	GD	W	D	L	GF	GA	GD
22	15	5	2	52	21	+31	50	8	3	0	31	12	+19	7	2	2	21	9	+12

Last updated: 17 June 2013.
Source: Ipl Stats

==== Results by round ====
Round	1	2	3	4	5	6	7	8	9	10	11	12	13	14	15	16	17	18	19	20	21	22
Ground	H	A	H	A	H	A	H	A	H	A	H	A	H	A	H	A	H	A	H	A	H	A
Result	W	W	W	D	D	D	D	W	W	W	D	W	W	L	W	W	W	W	W	W	W	L

Source: Competitive matches
A = Away; H = Home; W = Win; D = Draw; L = Loss

==== Matches ====
Win Draw Loss Postponed

4 August 2000 1	Esteghlal	4 – 1	Paykan	Tehran
	Ali Samereh 28', 61', 90'; Dariush Yazdani 62'		Ali Baghmisheh 90'	Stadium: Azadi Stadium

10 August 2000 2	Tractor Sazi	1 – 3	Esteghlal	Tabriz
	Ahmad Feyz-Karimloo 75'		Farhad Majidi 52', 61', 90'	Stadium: Takhti Stadium

18 August 2000 3	Esteghlal	6 – 1	Esteghlal Rasht	Tehran
	Mehdi Hasheminasab 35'; Mahmoud Fekri 44'; Farzad Majidi 48'; Ahmad Momenzadeh 61', 84'; Ali Samereh 75'		Saeed Bayat 30'	Stadium: Azadi Stadium; Attendance: 35,000

25 August 2000 4	Bargh Shiraz	0 – 0	Esteghlal	Shiraz
				Stadium: Hafezieh Stadium; Attendance: 35,000
Note: match was paused in 3' for 20 minutes due to fan riot

10 November 2000 5	Esteghlal	1 – 1	Sepahan	Tehran
	Mehdi Hasheminasab (pen.)		Davoud Dehghani	Stadium: Azadi Stadium

5 September 2000 6	Saipa	2 – 2	Esteghlal	Tehran
	Farhad Khangoli 6'; Behnam Abolghasempour 10'		Ali Samereh 61'; Ahmad Momenzadeh 88'	Stadium: Azadi Stadium; Attendance: 30,000

29 December 2000 7	Esteghlal	2 – 2	Persepolis	Tehran
	Mohammad Navazi 67'; Mehdi Hasheminasab 83'		Behrouz Rahbarifar 58' (pen.); Ali Karimi 88'	Stadium: Azadi Stadium; Attendance: 110,000

3 December 2000 8	Foolad	1 – 3	Esteghlal	Ahvaz
	Behnam Seraj 85'		Ali Samereh 10', 48', 80'	Stadium: Takhti Stadium; Attendance: 30,000

8 December 2000 9	Esteghlal	2 – 1	Fajr Sepasi	Tehran
	Mohammad Navazi 28'; Ali Samereh 38'		Faraz Fatemi 1'	Stadium: Azadi Stadium; Attendance: 20,000

13 December 2000 10	Zob Ahan	0 – 2	Esteghlal	Fooladshahr
			Sirous Dinmohammadi 38'; Ahmad Momenzadeh 45'	Stadium: Fooladshahr Stadium; Attendance: 20,000

24 December 2000 11	Esteghlal	1 – 1	PAS Tehran	Tehran
	Alireza Nikbakht 37'		Rasoul Khatibi 73'	Stadium: Azadi Stadium; Attendance: 10,000

4 January 2001 12	Paykan	0 – 4	Esteghlal	Tehran
			Ahmad Momenzadeh 48'; Rufat Quliyev 49'; Alireza Akbarpour 52'; Mojahed Khaziravi 78'	Stadium: Azadi Stadium; Attendance: 10,000

15 February 2001 13	Esteghlal	5 – 1	Tractor Sazi	Tehran
	Ali Samereh 5', 90'; Farzad Majidi 45'; Mojahed Khaziravi 50'; Ahmad Momenzadeh 78'		Aranik Marcussian 80'	Stadium: Azadi Stadium; Attendance: 25,000

10 March 2001 14	Esteghlal Rasht	1 – 0	Esteghlal	Rasht
	Shahram Parnianfar 80'			Stadium: Shahid Dr. Azodi Stadium

30 January 2001 15	Esteghlal	4 – 2	Bargh Shiraz	Tehran
	Alireza Akbarpour 18'; Sattar Hamedani 28'; Bahman Tahmasebi 80', 90'		Mehdi Shiri 1'; Mohammad Motavvari 25'	Stadium: Azadi Stadium; Attendance: 20,000

4 February 2001 16	Sepahan	0 – 2	Esteghlal	Isfahan
			Sattar Hamedani 29', 41'	Stadium: 22 Bahman Stadium; Attendance: 20,000

11 February 2001 17	Esteghlal	2 – 0	Saipa	Tehran
	Farzad Majidi 19'; Ali Samereh 85'			Stadium: Azadi Stadium; Attendance: 15,000

23 February 2001 18	Persepolis	0 – 1	Esteghlal	Tehran
			Alireza Akbarpour 74'	Stadium: Azadi Stadium; Attendance: 100,000

29 March 2001 19	Esteghlal	2 – 1	Foolad	Tehran
	Alireza Nikbakht 44'; Ali Samereh 65'		Behnam Seraj 6'	Stadium: Shahid Shiroudi Stadium; Attendance: 30,000

8 April 2001 20	Fajr Sepasi	2 – 3	Esteghlal	Shiraz
	Faraz Fatemi 25' (pen.); Mahmoud Khorramzi 68'		Ali Samereh 31'; Rufat Quliyev 66', 78'	Stadium: Hafezieh Stadium; Attendance: 30,000

14 April 2001 21	Esteghlal	2 – 1	Zob Ahan	Tabriz
	Mahmoud Fekri 60'; Ali Mousavi 77'		Reza Sahebi 61' (pen.)	Stadium: Imam Khomeini Stadium; Attendance: 25,000
Note: in Tabriz due to renovation Azadi stadium

19 April 2001 22	PAS Tehran	2 – 1	Esteghlal	Mashhad
	Amir Hossein Yousefi 14'; Rasoul Khatibi 65'		Mahmoud Fekri 43'	Stadium: Takhti Stadium; Attendance: 10,000

=== Hazfi Cup ===
==== Round of 32 ====
Esteghlal	2 – 0	Esteghlal Rasht	Tehran
			Stadium: Azadi Stadium

==== Round of 16 ====
30 April 2001 First leg	Esteghlal Ahvaz	2 – 2	Esteghlal	Ahvaz
	Afshin Kamali; Gholamreza Eydi		Bahman Tahmasebi; Ali Samereh	Stadium: Takhti Stadium

7 May 2001 Second leg	Esteghlal	1 – 1 (3 – 3 agg.)	Esteghlal Ahvaz	Tehran
	Ali Samereh 20'		Asghar Rasoulzadeh 54'	Stadium: Shahid Shiroudi Stadium
Note: Away goals rule

==== 1/8 finals ====
30 May 2001	Esteghlal	3 – 0	Paykan	Tehran
	Alireza Akbarpour; Mehdi Salehpour; Hamid Tabrizi			Stadium: Shahid Shiroudi Stadium

==== Quarterfinals ====
11 June 2001 First leg	Aboumoslem	3 – 2	Esteghlal	Mashhad
	Reza Enayati 11', 20'; Shokri 85'		Mehdi Salehpour 51'; Mojahed Khaziravi 63'	Stadium: Takhti Stadium

16 June 2001 Second leg	Esteghlal	3 – 1 (5 – 4 agg.)	Aboumoslem	Tehran
	Alireza Nikbakht 9'; Mehdi Salehpour 11', 56'		Hossein Badamaki 15'	Stadium: Shahid Shiroudi Stadium

==== Semifinal ====
20 June 2001 First leg	Fajr Sepasi	1 – 0	Esteghlal	Shiraz
	Davoud Seyed-Abbasi			Stadium: Koma Stadium

26 June 2001 Second leg	Esteghlal	2 – 2 (2 – 3 agg.)	Fajr Sepasi	Tehran
	Saeed Beigi 85'; Mehdi Hasheminasab 89' (pen.)		Vahid Rezaei 17'; Amir Vaziri 22'	Stadium: Shahid Shiroudi Stadium

=== Asian Cup Winners' Cup ===
==== First round ====
14 September 2000 First leg	Al-Wahda (United Arab Emirates)	3 – 2	(Iran) Esteghlal	Abu Dhabi, United Arab Emirates
			Alireza Nikbakht 67'; Mehdi Hasheminasab 85'	Stadium: Al-Nahyan Stadium

22 September 2000 Second leg	Esteghlal (Iran)	4 – 0 (6 – 3 agg.)	(United Arab Emirates) Al-Wahda	Tehran
	Farhad Majidi 3', 70'; Sattar Hamedani 45'; Alireza Akbarpour 75'			Stadium: Azadi Stadium

==== Second round ====
3 November 2000 First leg	Al-Sadd (Qatar)	0 – 1	(Iran) Esteghlal	Doha, Qatar
			Ali Samereh	Stadium: Jassim bin Hamad Stadium

17 November 2000 Second leg	Esteghlal (Iran)	2 – 1 (3 – 1 agg.)	(Qatar) Al-Sadd	Tehran, Iran
	Farhad Majidi 12'; Alireza Nikbakht 19'			Stadium: Azadi Stadium

==== Quarterfinals ====
2 March 2001 First leg	Kairat (Kazakhstan)	0 – 0	(Iran) Esteghlal	Almaty, Kazakhstan
				Stadium: Central Stadium

16 March 2001 Second leg	Esteghlal (Iran)	3 – 0 (3 – 0 agg.)	(Kazakhstan) Kairat	Tehran, Iran
	Own Goals 49'; Sirous Dinmohammadi 64'; Ali Samereh 76'			Stadium: Azadi Stadium

==== Semifinals ====
17 May 2001	Esteghlal (Iran)	2 – 3	(United Arab Emirates) Al-Shabab	Jeddah, Saudi Arabia
	Mohammad Navazi 28' (pen.); Ahmad Momenzadeh 60'

==== Third place match ====
19 May 2001	Esteghlal (Iran)	1 – 3	(Japan) Shimizu	Jeddah, Saudi Arabia
	Alireza Nikbakht 34'

== See also ==
- 2000–01 Azadegan League
- 2000–01 Hazfi Cup
- 2000–01 Asian Cup Winners' Cup
