= 2001–02 Esteghlal F.C. season =

Esteghlal F.C.
2001–02 season
- President: Ali Fathollahzadeh
- Head coach: Mansour Pourheidari
- Stadium: Azadi Stadium
- IPL: 2nd
- Hazfi Cup: Champions
- Asian Club Championship: Third place
- Top goalscorer: League: Sirous Dinmohammadi (8); All: Faraz Fatemi (19)
Home colours	Away colours

The 2001–02 season are the Esteghlal Football Club's 1st season in the Iran Pro League, and their 8th consecutive season in the top division of Iranian football. They are also competing in the Hazfi Cup and Asian Club Championship, and 57th year in existence as a football club.

== Club ==
=== Kit ===
Supplier: (Iran) Daei SWE
Sponsor(s): (South Korea) LG

Home Kit	Away Kit

=== Coaching staff ===
Position	Staff
Head coach	(Iran) Mansour Pourheidari
Assistant coach	(Iran) Gholamhossein Mazloomi
Goalkeepers coach	(Iran) Mansour Rashidi
Fitness coach	(Iran) Valiollah Salehnia
Doctor	(Iran) Dr. Amin Norouzi
Director	(Iran) Nasrollah Abdollahi

=== Other information ===
Chairman	(Iran) Hossein Gharib
Ground (capacity and dimensions)	Azadi Stadium (100,000 / 110x75m)

== Player ==
As of 1 September 2013. Esteghlal F.C. Iran Pro League Squad 2001–02

Note: Flags indicate national team as defined under FIFA eligibility rules; some limited exceptions apply. Players may hold more than one non-FIFA nationality.

No.	Pos.	Nation	Player
1	GK	IRN	Parviz Boroumand
4	DF	IRN	Mohammad Khorramgah
5	DF	IRN	Davoud Seyed Abbasi
6	DF	IRN	Mahmoud Fekri
7	DF	IRN	Sohrab Bakhtiarizadeh
8	MF	IRN	Mohammad Navazi
9	FW	IRN	Ali Mousavi
10	DF	IRN	Mehdi Pashazadeh
11	MF	IRN	Yadollah Akbari
12	MF	IRN	Mojahed Khaziravi
14	MF	IRN	Sirous Dinmohammadi
15	MF	IRN	Farzad Majidi

No.	Pos.	Nation	Player
16	FW	IRN	Alireza Akbarpour
17	FW	IRN	Ahmad Momenzadeh
18	FW	IRN	Faraz Fatemi
19	DF	IRN	Pirouz Ghorbani
20	DF	IRN	Mehdi Hasheminasab
21	DF	IRN	Arastou Mohammadi
22	MF	IRN	Alireza Nikbakht
24	MF	AZE	Rufat Guliev
29	GK	IRN	Masoud Ghasemi
31	GK	IRN	Hadi Tabatabaei
—	DF	IRN	Saeed Beigi
—	MF	IRN	Behzad Dadashzadeh

== Competitions ==
=== Overview ===
Competition	Started round	Current position / round	Final position / round	First match	Last match
2001–02 Iran Pro League	—	—	Runners-up	November 4, 2001	May 28, 2002
2001–02 Hazfi Cup	Round of 32	—	Winner	December 2, 2001	June 11, 2002
2001–02 Asian Club Championship	—	—	Third-place	December 21, 2001	April 5, 2002

Updated to match played 03 July 2013
Source: Competitions

=== Iran Pro League ===
==== Standings ====
Pos	Team	Pld	W	D	L	GF	GA	GD	Pts	Qualification or relegation
1	Persepolis (C)	26	13	10	3	36	23	+13	49	Qualification for the 2002–03 AFC Champions League group stage
2	Esteghlal	26	13	9	4	38	21	+17	48	Qualification for the 2002–03 AFC Champions League qualification
3	Foolad	26	12	9	5	32	23	+9	45	
4	Pas	26	10	13	3	39	24	+15	43	
5	Aboumoslem	26	11	7	8	40	31	+9	40	

Updated to match(es) played on 1 Sep 2018. Source: IPL Stats, Soccerway
Rules for classification: 1) Points; 2) Goal difference; 3) Goals scored.
(C) Champions

==== Results summary ====
Overall								Home						Away					
Pld	W	D	L	GF	GA	GD	Pts	W	D	L	GF	GA	GD	W	D	L	GF	GA	GD
26	13	9	4	38	21	+17	48	7	5	1	25	12	+13	6	4	3	13	9	+4

Last updated: 17 June 2013.
Source: Ipl Stats

==== Results by round ====
Round	1	2	3	4	5	6	7	8	9	10	11	12	13	14	15	16	17	18	19	20	21	22	23	24	25	26
Ground	A	H	H	A	H	A	H	A	H	A	H	A	H	H	A	A	H	A	H	A	H	A	H	A	H	A
Result	D	L	W	L	W	W	D	W	D	W	W	W	W	W	L	W	D	W	D	D	D	D	W	D	W	L

Source: Competitive matches
A = Away; H = Home; W = Win; D = Draw; L = Loss

==== Matches ====
Win Draw Loss Postponed

1	Bargh Shiraz	1 – 1	Esteghlal	Shiraz
	64'		Ali Mousavi 78'	Stadium: Hafezieh Stadium

2	Esteghlal	1 – 3	PAS	Tehran
	Ali Mousavi 18'			Stadium: Azadi Stadium

3	Esteghlal	4 – 0	Tractor Sazi	Tehran
	Mohammad Navazi; Sirous Dinmohammadi; Yadollah Akbari; Farzad Majidi			Stadium: Azadi Stadium

4	Zob Ahan	2 – 1	Esteghlal	Fooladshahr
			Sirous Dinmohammadi 74'	Stadium: Fooladshahr Stadium

5	Esteghlal	3 – 2	Esteghlal Rasht	Tehran
	Farzad Majidi; Own Goals; Davoud Seyed Abbasi			Stadium: Azadi Stadium

6	Saipa	0 – 1	Esteghlal	Tehran
			Farzad Majidi	Stadium: Azadi Stadium

7	Esteghlal	1 – 1	Fajr Sepasi	Tehran
	Faraz Fatemi			Stadium: Azadi Stadium

8	Foolad	1 – 2	Esteghlal	Ahvaz
			Mohammad Navazi; Alireza Akbarpour	Stadium: Takhti Stadium

9	Esteghlal	1 – 1	Persepolis	Tehran
	Mohammad Navazi 38' (pen.)		Reza Jabbari 25'; Ali Ansarian (yellow card) ?' (yellow-red card) 87'	Stadium: Azadi Stadium

10	Sepahan	0 – 1	Esteghlal	Isfahan
			Faraz Fatemi 34'	Stadium: Naghsh-e-Jahan Stadium

11	Esteghlal	2 – 1	Aboomoslem	Tehran
	Sohrab Bakhtiarizadeh 45'; Rufat Guliev			Stadium: Azadi Stadium

12	Paykan	1 – 3	Esteghlal	Tehran
			Sirous Dinmohammadi; Faraz Fatemi; Mojahed Khaziravi	Stadium: Azadi Stadium

13	Esteghlal	4 – 0	Malavan	Tehran
	Alireza Nikbakht 40'; Ahmad Momenzadeh; Ahmad Momenzadeh; Faraz Fatemi			Stadium: Azadi Stadium

14	Esteghlal	1 – 0	Bargh Shiraz	Tehran
	Sirous Dinmohammadi			Stadium: Azadi Stadium

15	PAS	2 – 1	Esteghlal	Tehran
			Sirous Dinmohammadi	Stadium: Azadi Stadium

16	Tractor Sazi	0 – 1	Esteghlal	Tabriz
			Faraz Fatemi 83'	Stadium: Yadegar-e-Emam Stadium

17	Esteghlal	2 – 2	Zob Ahan	Tehran
	Ahmad Momenzadeh; Mohammad Navazi			Stadium: Azadi Stadium

18	Esteghlal Rasht	0 – 1	Esteghlal	Rasht
			Ali Mousavi 28'	Stadium: Azodi Stadium

19	Esteghlal	2 – 2	Saipa	Tehran
	Alireza Nikbakht 40'; Sirous Dinmohammadi 68'			Stadium: Azadi Stadium

20	Fajr Sepasi	0 – 0	Esteghlal	Shiraz
				Stadium: Hafezieh Stadium

21	Esteghlal	0 – 0	Foolad	Tehran
				Stadium: Azadi Stadium

22	Persepolis	0 – 0	Esteghlal	Tehran
			Alireza Vahedi Nikbakht (red card) 86'	Stadium: Azadi Stadium

23	Esteghlal	3 – 0	Sepahan	Tehran
	Mohammad Navazi 10'; Javad Mohagheghian 46' (o.g.); Sirous Dinmohammadi 86'			Stadium: Azadi Stadium

24	Aboomoslem	1 – 1	Esteghlal	Mashhad
			Faraz Fatemi	Stadium: Takhti Stadium

25	Esteghlal	1 – 0	Paykan	Tehran
	Faraz Fatemi			Stadium: Azadi Stadium

26	Malavan	1 – 0	Esteghlal	Anzali
				Stadium: Takhti Stadium

=== Hazfi Cup ===
==== Round of 32 ====
First leg	Lashgar 30 Gorgan	1 – 4	Esteghlal	Gorgan
			Faraz Fatemi; Faraz Fatemi; Faraz Fatemi; Davoud Seyed Abbasi

Second leg	Esteghlal	3 – 0 (7 – 1 agg.)	Lashgar 30 Gorgan	Tehran
	Mehdi Hasheminasab; Mehdi Hasheminasab; Faraz Fatemi			Stadium: Azadi Stadium

==== Round of 16 ====
PAS Tehran	2 – 4	Esteghlal	Tehran
		Ahmad Momenzadeh; Sirous Dinmohammadi; Mohammad Navazi; Mojahed Khaziravi	Stadium: Azadi Stadium

==== Quarterfinals ====
First leg	Zob Ahan	0 – 0	Esteghlal	Fooladshahr
				Stadium: Fooladshahr Stadium

Second leg	Esteghlal	3 – 0 (3 – 0 agg.)	Zob Ahan	Tehran
	Ahmad Momenzadeh; Sohrab Bakhtiarizadeh; Mohammad Navazi			Stadium: Azadi Stadium

==== Semifinal ====
First leg	Sepahan	4 – 2	Esteghlal	Isfahan
	17'; 48'; 50'; 55'		Yadollah Akbari 57'; Ali Mousavi 64'	Stadium: Naghsh-e-Jahan Stadium

Second leg	Esteghlal	3 – 1 (5 – 5 agg.)	Sepahan	Tehran
	Yadollah Akbari 13' (pen.); Faraz Fatemi 78'; Ahmad Momenzadeh 82'		90'	Stadium: Azadi Stadium
Note: Away goals rule

==== Final ====
First leg	Fajr Sepasi	1 – 2	Esteghlal	Shiraz
			Yadollah Akbari 57'; Sirous Dinmohammadi 87'	Stadium: Hafezieh Stadium

Second leg	Esteghlal	2 – 2 (4 – 3 agg.)	Fajr Sepasi	Tehran
	Ali Mousavi 7', 38'		6'; 20'	Stadium: Azadi Stadium

=== Asian Club Championship ===
==== First round ====
Esteghlal (Iran)	w/o	(Lebanon) Al-Hekmeh
Note: Al-Hekmeh withdrew

==== Second round ====
9 March 2002 First leg	Al-Ittihad (Saudi Arabia)	3 – 2	(Iran) Esteghlal	Jeddah, Saudi Arabia
	Nikbakht o.g.'		Nikbakht 16'; Fekri 44'	Stadium: Prince Abdullah al-Faisal Stadium

9 March 2002 Second leg	Esteghlal (Iran)	2 – 1 (4 – 4 agg.)	(Saudi Arabia) Al-Ittihad	Tehran, Iran
	Navazi 70' (pen.); Nikbakht 93'		5'	Stadium: Azadi Stadium
Note: Away goals rule

==== Quarterfinals ====
===== West Asia =====
Team	Pld	W	D	L	GF	GA	GD	Pts	Qualification
(Iran) Esteghlal	3	2	1	0	9	4	+5	7	Advance to Semi-finals
(Uzbekistan) Nasaf Qarshi	3	1	2	0	4	3	+1	5	Advance to Semi-finals
Al-Kuwait	3	0	2	1	3	6	−3	2	
(United Arab Emirates) Al-Wahda (H)	3	0	1	2	6	9	−3	1	

(H) Hosts

6 February 2002 1	Al-Wahda (United Arab Emirates)	3 – 5	(Iran) Esteghlal	Abu Dhabi, UAE
	Al Ruaisi 12'; Jumaa 49', 72'		Dinmohammadi 40'; Akbarpour 64'; Fatemi 80', 83'; Hasheminasab 87'

8 February 2002 2	Nasaf Qarshi (Uzbekistan)	1 – 1	(Iran) Esteghlal	Abu Dhabi, UAE
			Nikbakht

10 February 2002 3	Al Kuwait Kaifan	0 – 3	(Iran) Esteghlal	Abu Dhabi, UAE
			Akbarpour 76'; Fatemi 80', 85'

==== Semifinals ====
3 April 2002	Esteghlal (Iran)	1 – 2	(South Korea) Anyang LG Cheetahs	Tehran, Iran
	Akbari 62'		Aurélio 55'; Luiz 72'	Stadium: Azadi Stadium

==== Third place match ====
5 April 2002	Esteghlal (Iran)	5 – 2	(Uzbekistan) Nasaf Qarshi	Tehran, Iran
	Navazi (pen.); Fatemi; Pashazadeh		Usmankhodjaev; Kholmurodov	Stadium: Azadi Stadium

== See also ==
- 2001–02 Iran Pro League
- 2001–02 Hazfi Cup
- 2001–02 Asian Club Championship
