= Syria at the 1997 West Asian Games =

- IOC code: SYR
- NOC: Syrian Olympic Committee

in Tehran
- Medals Ranked 3rd: Gold 16 Silver 22 Bronze 13 Total 51

West Asian Games appearances
- 1997; 2002; 2005

Syria participated in the 1997 West Asian Games held in Tehran, Iran from November 19 to November 28, 1997. Syria ranked 3rd with 16 gold medals in this edition of the West Asian Games.

== Medal table ==
Sport	Gold	Silver	Bronze	Total
Athletics	1	–	–	1
Badminton	–	–	–	–
Basketball	–	–	–	–
Boxing	3	2	3	8
Fencing	–	–	–	–
Football	–	1	–	1
Judo	3	2	–	5
Karate	2	3	2	7
Shooting	–	–	–	–
Swimming	3	3	5	11
Table tennis	–	–	–	–
Taekwondo	–	–	–	–
Tennis	–	–	–	–
Weightlifting	–	4	1	5
Wrestling	4	7	2	13
Total	16	22	13	51
