= Swimming at the 1997 West Asian Games =

- Venue: Azadi Swimming Pool
- Date: 22–24 November 1997

Swimming was one of the many sports which was held at the 1997 West Asian Games in Tehran, Iran between 22 and 24 November 1997. The competition took place at the Azadi Sport Complex. It had a men's only programme containing sixteen events. A total of 35 swimmers from six nations (Iran, Syria, Kuwait, Kyrgyzstan, Turkmenistan and Tajikistan) participated.

== Medalists ==
| Event | Gold | Silver | Bronze |
|---|---|---|---|
| 50 m freestyle | Fahad Al-Otaibi; Kuwait | Vitaly Vasilyev; Kyrgyzstan | Behzad Mehdi-Khabbazan; Iran |
| 100 m freestyle | Fahad Al-Otaibi; Kuwait | Vitaly Vasilyev; Kyrgyzstan | Aleksandr Yegorov; Kyrgyzstan |
| 200 m freestyle | Fadi Kouzmah; Syria | Vitaly Vasilyev; Kyrgyzstan | Hamed Rezakhani; Iran |
| 400 m freestyle | Hisham Al-Masri; Syria | Konstantin Andriushin; Kyrgyzstan | Fadi Kouzmah; Syria |
| 1500 m freestyle | Hisham Al-Masri; Syria | Konstantin Andriushin; Kyrgyzstan | Hamed Rezakhani; Iran |
| 100 m backstroke | Konstantin Priahin; Kyrgyzstan | Fahad Al-Otaibi; Kuwait | Aleksandr Yegorov; Kyrgyzstan |
| 200 m backstroke | Konstantin Priahin; Kyrgyzstan | Fahad Al-Otaibi; Kuwait | Aleksandr Yegorov; Kyrgyzstan |
| 100 m breaststroke | Yevgeny Petrashov; Kyrgyzstan | Ahmad Seoar; Syria | Khashayar Hazrati; Iran |
| 200 m breaststroke | Yevgeny Petrashov; Kyrgyzstan | Ahmad Seoar; Syria | Khashayar Hazrati; Iran |
| 100 m butterfly | Konstantin Andriushin; Kyrgyzstan | Yevgeny Petrashov; Kyrgyzstan | Fadi Kouzmah; Syria |
| 200 m butterfly | Konstantin Andriushin; Kyrgyzstan | Fadi Kouzmah; Syria | Mohiuddin Qalala; Syria |
| 200 m individual medley | Yevgeny Petrashov; Kyrgyzstan | Aleksandr Yegorov; Kyrgyzstan | Sultan Al-Otaibi; Kuwait |
| 400 m individual medley | Yevgeny Petrashov; Kyrgyzstan | Sultan Al-Otaibi; Kuwait | Mohiuddin Qalala; Syria |
| 4 × 100 m freestyle relay | Kyrgyzstan | Kuwait | Iran |
| 4 × 200 m freestyle relay | Kyrgyzstan | Kuwait | Syria |
| 4 × 100 m medley relay | Kyrgyzstan | Kuwait | Iran |

== Medal table ==
| Rank | Nation | Gold | Silver | Bronze | Total |
|---|---|---|---|---|---|
| 1 | Kyrgyzstan (KGZ) | 11 | 7 | 3 | 21 |
| 2 | Syria (SYR) | 3 | 3 | 5 | 11 |
| 3 | Kuwait (KUW) | 2 | 6 | 1 | 9 |
| 4 | Iran (IRI) | 0 | 0 | 7 | 7 |
| Totals (4 entries) | | 16 | 16 | 16 | 48 |
