= Swimming at the 2002 West Asian Games =

- Venue: Fahad Al-Ahmad Swimming Complex
- Date: 4–7 April 2002

The swimming events at the 2002 West Asian Games were held at Fahad Al-Ahmad Swimming Complex, Kuwait City, Kuwait, from 4 to 7 April 2002.

It had a men's-only programme containing 16 events. A total of nine nations (Iran, Syria, Kuwait, Saudi Arabia, Jordan, UAE, Palestine, Qatar and Lebanon) participated.

== Medalists ==
Event	Gold		Silver		Bronze	
50 m freestyle	Mohammed Yamani; Saudi Arabia	24.58	Fadi Jalab; Syria	24.62	Zaid Al-Marafi; Jordan	25.00
100 m freestyle	Naeem Al-Masri; Syria	54.26	Fahad Al-Otaibi; Kuwait	54.33	Thamer Al-Shamroukh; Kuwait	54.36
200 m freestyle	Fadi Kouzmah; Syria	1:57.01	Fahad Al-Otaibi; Kuwait	1:57.51	Mansoor Al-Mansoor; Kuwait	1:59.06
400 m freestyle	Fadi Kouzmah; Syria	4:07.97	Thamer Al-Shamroukh; Kuwait	4:11.91	Naeem Al-Masri; Syria	4:18.75
1500 m freestyle	Naeem Al-Masri; Syria	16:36.36	Thamer Al-Shamroukh; Kuwait	16:41.48	Saleh Mohammad; Syria	17:17.88
100 m backstroke	Mansoor Al-Mansoor; Kuwait	1:00.23	Fahad Al-Otaibi; Kuwait	1:00.64	Maher Al-Motar; Saudi Arabia	1:02.49
200 m backstroke	Mansoor Al-Mansoor; Kuwait	2:12.75	Saleh Mohammad; Syria	2:22.59	Zainalabdeen Qali; Kuwait	2:24.77
100 m breaststroke	Ahmed Al-Kudmani; Saudi Arabia	1:06.02	Mahmoud Sijah; Syria	1:08.60	Baktash Gheidi; Iran	1:09.90
200 m breaststroke	Ahmed Al-Kudmani; Saudi Arabia	2:22.71	Mahmoud Sijah; Syria	2:30.57	Mahmoud Al-Jadan; Syria	2:31.94
100 m butterfly	Mohammed Yamani; Saudi Arabia	57.89	Mansoor Al-Mansoor; Kuwait	57.92	Waleed Al-Qahtani; Kuwait	58.27
200 m butterfly	Fadi Kouzmah; Syria	2:06.60	Waleed Al-Qahtani; Kuwait	2:08.38	Mansoor Al-Mansoor; Kuwait	2:12.56
200 m individual medley	Fahad Al-Otaibi; Kuwait	2:11.92	Mahmoud Al-Jadan; Syria	2:14.26	Obaid Al-Jasmi; United Arab Emirates	2:14.49
400 m individual medley	Naeem Al-Masri; Syria	4:41.68	Mahmoud Al-Jadan; Syria	4:48.31	Fahad Al-Otaibi; Kuwait	4:49.00
4 × 100 m freestyle relay	Kuwait	3:36.50	Saudi Arabia	3:37.46	Syria	3:42.88
4 × 200 m freestyle relay	Kuwait	7:56.63	Syria	8:04.91	Saudi Arabia	8:06.87
4 × 100 m medley relay	Saudi Arabia	3:59.25	Kuwait	4:02.17	Syria	4:11.81

== Medal table ==
Rank	Nation	Gold	Silver	Bronze	Total
1	Syria (SYR)	6	7	5	18
2	Kuwait (KUW)	5	8	6	19
3	Saudi Arabia (KSA)	5	1	2	8
4	Iran (IRI)	0	0	1	1
4	Jordan (JOR)	0	0	1	1
4	United Arab Emirates (UAE)	0	0	1	1
Totals (6 entries)		16	16	16	48
