= Gymnastics at the 2002 West Asian Games =

- Venue: Yarmouk Hall
- Date: 10–12 April 2002

Artistic gymnastics at the 2002 West Asian Games was held at Yarmouk Hall, Kuwait City, Kuwait from 10 to 12 April 2002.

The competition had a men's only programme containing 8 events. A total of 6 nations (Iran, Syria, Kuwait, Saudi Arabia, Jordan and Yemen) participated.

== Medalists ==
Event	Gold	Silver	Bronze
Team	Kuwait; Ahmad Al-Duraia; Fahad Al-Ghannam; Ahmad Al-Herz; Saqer Al-Mulla; Mohammad Al-Omran; Nayef Dashti; Bader Mohammad	Iran; Mahmoud Arab; Mahan Bajrang; Mohammad Hadi Ghasemi; Ahmad Majdi; Mehdi Niroumand; Mohammad Reza Samaei; Ali Shariati	Syria; Ahmad Amir Abdulkafi; Louay Al-Heraki; Amer Attar; Fadi Bahlawan; Mohammad Daher; Sadeq Daher
Individual all-around	Saqer Al-Mulla; Kuwait	Mohammad Hadi Ghasemi; Iran	Shared silver
Individual all-around	Saqer Al-Mulla; Kuwait	Fadi Bahlawan; Syria	Shared silver
Floor	Mohammad Hadi Ghasemi; Iran	Fadi Bahlawan; Syria	Ahmad Al-Herz; Kuwait
Floor	Mohammad Hadi Ghasemi; Iran	Fadi Bahlawan; Syria	Maki Al-Mubiareek; Saudi Arabia
Floor	Mohammad Hadi Ghasemi; Iran	Fadi Bahlawan; Syria	Nashwan Al-Harazi; Yemen
Pommel horse	Nayef Dashti; Kuwait	Shared gold	Nashwan Al-Harazi; Yemen
Pommel horse	Saqer Al-Mulla; Kuwait	Shared gold	Nashwan Al-Harazi; Yemen
Rings	Sadeq Daher; Syria	Shared gold	Mahan Bajrang; Iran
Rings	Sadeq Daher; Syria	Shared gold	Mohammad Daher; Syria
Rings	Ahmad Al-Herz; Kuwait	Shared gold	Fahad Al-Ghannam; Kuwait
Vault	Ali Al-Asi; Jordan	Shared gold	Nashwan Al-Harazi; Yemen
Vault	Maki Al-Mubiareek; Saudi Arabia	Shared gold	Nashwan Al-Harazi; Yemen
Parallel bars	Mohammad Reza Samaei; Iran	Shared gold	Mohammad Hadi Ghasemi; Iran
Parallel bars	Mohammad Reza Samaei; Iran	Shared gold	Fadi Bahlawan; Syria
Parallel bars	Sadeq Daher; Syria	Shared gold	Ahmad Al-Duraia; Kuwait
Horizontal bar	Fahad Al-Ghannam; Kuwait	Mohammad Hadi Ghasemi; Iran	Mahan Bajrang; Iran
Horizontal bar	Fahad Al-Ghannam; Kuwait	Mohammad Hadi Ghasemi; Iran	Mohammad Abu Saleh; Jordan

== Medal table ==
Rank	Nation	Gold	Silver	Bronze	Total
1	Kuwait (KUW)	6	0	3	9
2	Iran (IRI)	2	3	3	8
3	Syria (SYR)	2	2	3	7
4	Jordan (JOR)	1	0	1	2
4	Saudi Arabia (KSA)	1	0	1	2
6	Yemen (YEM)	0	0	3	3
Totals (6 entries)		12	5	14	31
