= 2000 Iran vs Asia All-Stars Game =

On 21 January 2000, Iran national football team played against an Asian all-star side, in an exhibition testimonial match for Iranian captain Nader Mohammadkhani. Iran's lanky striker Ali Daei scored a Hat-trick. Asian all-star's best chances were minute 42, when Ruslan Baltiev's header hit the woodwork and other missed opportunity was Esam Salem's minute 66 penalty that was saved by Davoud Fanaei. Also Mohammed bin Hammam was the official VIP guest.

21 January 2000

Iran	5 – 0	Asia All-Stars
Ali Daei 20', 22', 82'; Ali Mousavi 44'; Sirous Dinmohammadi 46'

Azadi Stadium, Tehran
Attendance: 45,000
Referee: Lu Jun (China)

IRAN:
GK	Parviz Broumand	(substituted off) 46'
RB	Behrouz Rahbarifar
CB	Mehdi Hasheminasab
LB	Nader Mohammadkhani(c)	(substituted off) 46'
RM	Esmail Halali	(substituted off) 46'
CM	Karim Bagheri	(substituted off) 46'
CM	Sirous Dinmohammadi
LM	Mohammad Navazi	(substituted off) 46'
RF	Khodadad Azizi
CF	Ali Daei
LF	Ali Mousavi
Substitutions:
GK	Davoud Fanaei for Broumand	(substituted on) 46'
LB	Sattar Hamedani for Mohammadkhani	(substituted on) 46'
CM	Hamed Kavianpour for Bagheri	(substituted on) 46'
RM	Abdollah Veisi for Halali	(substituted on) 46'
LM	Alireza Emamifar for Navazi	(substituted on) 46'
MF	Majid Basirat for ?	(substituted on) ?'
FW	Behnam Abolghasempour for ?	(substituted on) ?'
Manager:
(Iran) Mansour Pourheidari

Asia All-Stars:
GK	(Qatar) Mohamed Anyas	(substituted off) ?'
RB	(United Arab Emirates) Kazim Ali Abdulla	(substituted off) ?'
CB	(South Korea) Hong Myung-Bo(c)
CB	(Vietnam) Trần Công Minh
LB	(Thailand) Dusit Chalermsan
RM	(Lebanon) Jamal Taha	(substituted off) ?'
CM	(Uzbekistan) Aleksandr Khvostunov
LM	(Iraq) Essam Hamad Salem
RW	(South Korea) Lee Dong-Gook
FW	(Jordan) Badran Al-Shaqran	(substituted off) ?'
CF	(Kazakhstan) Ruslan Baltiyev
Substitutions:
GK	(Uzbekistan) Yevgeni Safonov for Anyas		(substituted on) ?'
DF	(Japan) Atsuhiro Miura for Abdullah		(substituted on) ?'
MF	(Uzbekistan) Nikolai Shirshov for Taha		(substituted on) ?'
MF	(South Korea) Yoo Sang-Chul for Al-Shaqran		(substituted on) ?'
Managers:
(Saudi Arabia) Khalil Ibrahim Al-Zayani (Kuwait) Asad Taqi (Japan) Junji Agura

Man of the Match:
Ali Daei (Iran)

Assistant referees:
Hussein Qadanfari (Kuwait)
Muhammed al-Mousawi (Oman)
Fourth official:
Jalal Moradi (Iran)

== Unused Players ==
The following players were members of the squads but did not get any game time

Iran

- (Iran) Hadi Tabatabaei
- (Iran) Javad Zarincheh
- (Iran) Sohrab Bakhtiarizadeh
- (Iran) Mahmoud Fekri
- (Iran) Laith Nobari
- (Iran) Hamid Reza Estili
- (Iran) Javad Nekounam

Asia All-Stars

- (Iran) Afshin Peyrovani
- (Iraq) Abbas Obeid Jassim
- (Thailand) Tawan Sripan
- (Kuwait) Adel Oqla
