= Karate at the 2002 West Asian Games =

- Venue: Ittihad Hall
- Date: 8–10 April 2002

The Karate competition at the 2002 West Asian Games was held at the Ittihad Hall, Kuwait City, Kuwait.

== Medalists ==
=== Kata ===
Event	Gold	Silver	Bronze
Individual	Mohsen Ashrafi; Iran	Alaa Al-Hawaj; Kuwait	Fahad Al-Yousef; Kuwait
Individual	Mohsen Ashrafi; Iran	Alaa Al-Hawaj; Kuwait	Abdulaziz Dalloul; Qatar
Team	Kuwait	Iran	Syria
Team	Kuwait	Iran	Qatar

=== Kumite ===
Event	Gold	Silver	Bronze
−55 kg	Bader Al-Otaibi; Kuwait	Khalid Sulaiman; United Arab Emirates	Abdullah Dalloul; Qatar
−55 kg	Bader Al-Otaibi; Kuwait	Khalid Sulaiman; United Arab Emirates	Hamad Al-Mathkouri; Kuwait
−60 kg	Hossein Rouhani; Iran	Abdullah Al-Otaibi; Kuwait	Salem Al-Marzouq; Jordan
−60 kg	Hossein Rouhani; Iran	Abdullah Al-Otaibi; Kuwait	Ahmad Hasaballah; Syria
−65 kg	Nayef Al-Matrouk; Kuwait	Naser Al-Ajmi; Kuwait	Fakhruddin Abdulmajid; United Arab Emirates
−65 kg	Nayef Al-Matrouk; Kuwait	Naser Al-Ajmi; Kuwait	Bassam Eid; Bahrain
−70 kg	Salah Al-Harbi; Kuwait	Fallah Hamiah; Lebanon	Alireza Katiraei; Iran
−70 kg	Salah Al-Harbi; Kuwait	Fallah Hamiah; Lebanon	Ammar Al-Sabsabi; Syria
−75 kg	Jasem Vishkaei; Iran	Ahmad Muneer; Kuwait	Ali Al-Dosari; Kuwait
−75 kg	Jasem Vishkaei; Iran	Ahmad Muneer; Kuwait	Mohammad Haidar; Lebanon
−80 kg	Ahmad Bilal; Kuwait	Mohammad Al-Rubian; Kuwait	Ali Shaterzadeh; Iran
−80 kg	Ahmad Bilal; Kuwait	Mohammad Al-Rubian; Kuwait	Noureddine Alah; Syria
+80 kg	Jaber Al-Hammad; Kuwait	Nasser Khajeh-Hosseini; Iran	Souhail Salman; Syria
+80 kg	Jaber Al-Hammad; Kuwait	Nasser Khajeh-Hosseini; Iran	Ayoub Lashkari; United Arab Emirates
Openweight	Alireza Katiraei; Iran	Jasem Vishkaei; Iran	Naowras Al-Hamwi; Syria
Openweight	Alireza Katiraei; Iran	Jasem Vishkaei; Iran	Khalid Falatah; Saudi Arabia
Team	Kuwait	Syria	Iran
Team	Kuwait	Syria	Qatar

== Medal table ==
Rank	Nation	Gold	Silver	Bronze	Total
1	Kuwait (KUW)	7	5	3	15
2	Iran (IRI)	4	3	3	10
3	Syria (SYR)	0	1	6	7
4	United Arab Emirates (UAE)	0	1	2	3
5	Lebanon (LIB)	0	1	1	2
6	Qatar (QAT)	0	0	4	4
7	Bahrain (BRN)	0	0	1	1
7	Jordan (JOR)	0	0	1	1
7	Saudi Arabia (KSA)	0	0	1	1
Totals (9 entries)		11	11	22	44
