= Athletics at the 2002 West Asian Games =

- Venue: KAAF Stadium
- Date: 10–12 April 2002

At the 2002 West Asian Games. the athletics events were held in Kuwait City, Kuwait in April 2002. It had a men's only programme containing seventeen track and field events. Several athletics events usually held at multi-sport events were excluded from the schedule: the steeplechase, 10,000 metres, javelin and discus throws, marathon and race walking events were all absent.

All of the twelve countries present at the games sent athletes to compete in the athletics and eight of them reached the medal table. Qatar finished with the most medals, taking seven gold medals in a haul of sixteen. Saudi Arabia were the next best with five golds and fourteen overall, while the hosts Kuwait took third in the table through their four golds from eleven medals in total. These three countries dominated the events, with Jean-Claude Rabbath's gold for Lebanon and Ali Feizi's silver for Iran being the only top two placings among the rest of the nations.

Some of the best results came from the sprinting events: Salem Al-Yami won the 100 metres in a Saudi Arabian record time of 10.13 seconds, while Fawzi Al-Shammari did a 200/400 metres double, breaking the Kuwaiti national record with a run of 45.25 seconds in the latter. Qatari athletes won six of the nine medals on offer in the middle- and long-distance running events. Qatar also won both of the throwing events, including Bilal Saad Mubarak's shot put victory in 19.10 metres. Saudi Arabia swept the hurdles through Mubarak Ata Mubarak and Hadi Soua'an Al-Somaily with times of 13.60 and 49.04 seconds, respectively – a good standard for the region.

A number of West Asian Games champions went on to win at the 2002 Asian Games held in October later that year: Fawzi Al-Shammari won the 400 m, Hadi Soua'an Al-Somaily won the 400 m hurdles, Khamis Abdullah Saifeldin won the 3000 m steeplechase and Salem Al-Ahmadi won the triple jump. West Asian silver medallists Jamal Al-Saffar and Mukhlid Al-Otaibi also topped the podium at the Asian Games and Hussein Al-Sabee (third in the long jump here) was another Asian Games champion. Many athletes from this edition of the West Asian Games were also medallists at the 2002 Asian Athletics Championships held in August later that year.

== Medalists ==
Event	Gold		Silver		Bronze	
100 m	Salem Al-Yami; Saudi Arabia	10.13; GR	Jamal Al-Saffar; Saudi Arabia	10.19	Khalid Al-Obaidli; Qatar	10.39
200 m	Fawzi Al-Shammari; Kuwait	20.44; GR	Salem Al-Yami; Saudi Arabia	20.81	Mohammed Al-Hooti; Oman	21.02
400 m	Fawzi Al-Shammari; Kuwait	45.25; GR	Hamdan Al-Bishi; Saudi Arabia	46.34	Mohammed Al-Muwalid; Saudi Arabia	48.13
800 m	Adam Abdu Adam; Qatar	1:48.66; GR	Salem Amer Al-Badri; Qatar	1:49.70	Jalil Gomehei; Iran	1:49.81
1500 m	Abubaker Ali Kamal; Qatar	3:51.50; GR	Abdulrahman Suleiman; Qatar	3:51.76	Faisal Al-Nahli; Saudi Arabia	3:52.63
5000 m	Khamis Abdullah Saifeldin; Qatar	13:57.25; GR	Mukhlid Al-Otaibi; Saudi Arabia	13:57.58	Ahmed Ibrahim Warsama; Qatar	14:08.84
110 m hurdles	Mubarak Ata Mubarak; Saudi Arabia	13.60	Nasser Meziane; Qatar	14.02	Mubarak Khasif; Qatar	14.17
400 m hurdles	Hadi Soua'an Al-Somaily; Saudi Arabia	49.04; GR	Bader Al-Fulaij; Kuwait	49.58	Zahirudin Al-Najem; Syria	51.15
4 × 100 m relay	Saudi Arabia; Salem Al-Yami; Jamal Al-Saffar; Khalifa Al-Saker; Mubarak Ata Mubarak	39.02; GR	Qatar	39.10	Kuwait; Abdullah Sekin; Ibrahim Al-Asak; Saad Al-Zaferi; Husein Al-Youhah	41.10
4 × 400 m relay	Kuwait; Fawzi Al-Shammari; Khaled Al-Johar; Bader Al-Fulaij; Basil Al-Fadhli	3:06.51; GR	Saudi Arabia; Hadi Soua'an Al-Somaily; Hamdan Al-Bishi; Mohammed Al-Muwalid; Bilal Al-Houssaoui	3:06.57	Syria	3:11.75
High jump	Jean-Claude Rabbath; Lebanon	2.10 =GR	Omar Al-Masrahi; Saudi Arabia	2.07	Salem Al-Anezi; Kuwait	2.07
Pole vault	Fahad Al-Mershad; Kuwait	4.90; GR	Abdulla Ghanim Saeed; Qatar	4.80	Pendar Shoghian; Iran	4.50
Long jump	Said Mansoor; Qatar	7.61; GR	Al-Waleed Abdulla; Qatar	7.57	Hussein Al-Sabee; Saudi Arabia	7.55
Triple jump	Salem Al-Ahmadi; Saudi Arabia	16.50	Khaled Al-Bakheet; Kuwait	16.36	Fayez Al-Kheirat; Syria	15.96
Shot put	Bilal Saad Mubarak; Qatar	19.10; GR	Ahmad Gholoum; Kuwait	18.04	Ali Rahmani; Iran	17.58
Hammer throw	Mohamed Faraj Al-Kaabi; Qatar	66.34; GR	Ali Al-Zenkawi; Kuwait	66.01	Naser Al-Jarallah; Kuwait	64.54
Decathlon	Ahmad Hassan Moussa; Qatar	7262; GR	Ali Feizi; Iran	6838	Khalifa Isa Abdullah; Bahrain	5682

== Medal table ==
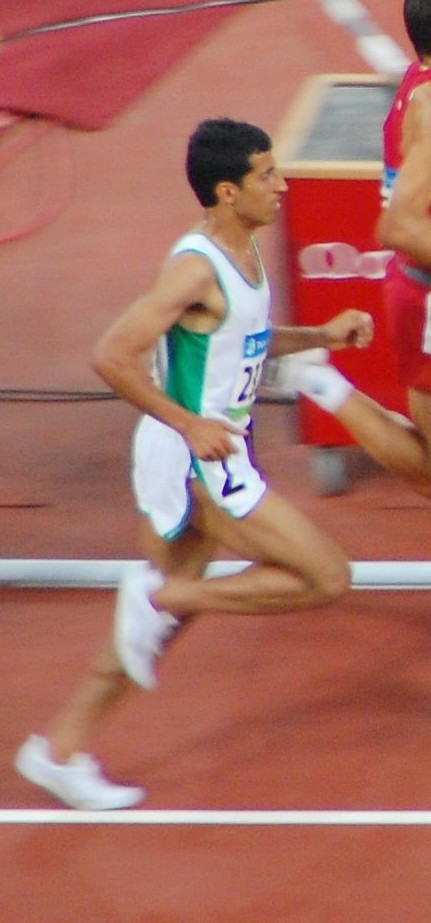
Mukhlid Al-Otaibi (pictured at the 2008 Olympics) won the 5000 metres silver medal for Saudi Arabia.

Rank	Nation	Gold	Silver	Bronze	Total
1	Qatar (QAT)	7	6	3	16
2	Saudi Arabia (KSA)	5	6	3	14
3	Kuwait (KUW)	4	4	3	11
4	Lebanon (LIB)	1	0	0	1
5	Iran (IRI)	0	1	3	4
6	Syria (SYR)	0	0	3	3
7	Bahrain (BRN)	0	0	1	1
7	Oman (OMA)	0	0	1	1
Totals (8 entries)		17	17	17	51
