= Iran at the 1997 West Asian Games =

- IOC code: IRI
- NOC: National Olympic Committee of the Islamic Republic of Iran
- Website: www.olympic.ir (in Persian and English)

in Tehran
- Medals Ranked 1st: Gold 53 Silver 37 Bronze 56 Total 146

West Asian Games appearances
- 1997; 2002; 2005

Iran participated in the 1st West Asian Games held in Tehran, Iran from November 19 to 28, 1997. Iran ranked 1st with 53 gold medals in this edition of the West Asian Games.

== Medal table ==
Sport	Gold	Silver	Bronze	Total
Athletics	11	13	14	38
Badminton	3	3	6	12
Basketball	1			1
Boxing	7	2	3	12
Fencing	2	4	4	10
Football	1			1
Judo	3	2	1	6
Karate	7	4	8	19
Shooting	1	2	4	7
Swimming			7	7
Table tennis	3	2	3	8
Taekwondo	6	1	1	8
Tennis	3		2	5
Weightlifting	6		1	7
Wrestling	9	4	2	15
Total	63	37	56	156
