= Squash at the 2002 West Asian Games =

- Venue: Qadsia Club
- Date: 4–9 April 2002

The Squash competition at the 2002 West Asian Games was held at the Qadsia Club, Kuwait City, Kuwait from 4 to 9 April 2002.

== Medalists ==
| Event | Gold | Silver | Bronze |
|---|---|---|---|
| Individual | Mohammad Al-Said; Jordan | Zeyad Al-Owayish; Kuwait | Saoud Al-Sulaiti; Qatar |
| Team | Kuwait | Jordan | Saudi Arabia |

== Medal table ==
| Rank | Nation | Gold | Silver | Bronze | Total |
|---|---|---|---|---|---|
| 1 | Jordan (JOR) | 1 | 1 | 0 | 2 |
| 1 | Kuwait (KUW) | 1 | 1 | 0 | 2 |
| 3 | Qatar (QAT) | 0 | 0 | 1 | 1 |
| 3 | Saudi Arabia (KSA) | 0 | 0 | 1 | 1 |
| Totals (4 entries) | | 2 | 2 | 2 | 6 |
