= Iran at the 2002 West Asian Games =

- IOC code: IRI
- NOC: National Olympic Committee of the Islamic Republic of Iran
- Website: www.olympic.ir (in Persian and English)

in Kuwait City
- Medals Ranked 3rd: Gold 9 Silver 11 Bronze 16 Total 36

West Asian Games appearances
- 1997; 2002; 2005

Iran participated in the 2nd West Asian Games held in Kuwait City, Kuwait from April 3 to 12, 2002. Iran ranked 3rd with 9 gold medals in this edition of the West Asian Games.

== Medal summary ==
=== Medal table ===
Sport	Gold	Silver	Bronze	Total
Aquatics, Diving			2	2
Aquatics, Swimming			1	1
Athletics		1	3	4
Fencing	3	3	4	10
Football		1		1
Gymnastics	2	3	3	8
Karate	4	3	3	10
Total	9	11	16	36

=== Medalists ===
Medal	Name	Sport	Event
Gold	Farhad Rezaei	Fencing	Men's individual épée
Gold	Peyman Fakhri	Fencing	Men's individual sabre
Gold	Mojtaba Abedini; Peyman Fakhri; Hadi Mohammadzadeh	Fencing	Men's team sabre
Gold	Mohammad Hadi Ghasemi	Gymnastics	Men's floor
Gold	Mohammad Reza Samaei	Gymnastics	Men's parallel bars
Gold	Mohsen Ashrafi	Karate	Men's kata individual
Gold	Hossein Rouhani	Karate	Men's kumite 60 kg
Gold	Jasem Vishkaei	Karate	Men's kumite 75 kg
Gold	Alireza Katiraei	Karate	Men's kumite open
Silver	Ali Feizi	Athletics	Men's decathlon
Silver	Siamak Feiz-Asgari; Farhad Rezaei; Mohammad Rezaei; Mohsen Tavakkoli	Fencing	Men's team épée
Silver	Sirous Feiz-Asgari; Keivan Javanshir; Mohammad Mirmohammadi; Javad Rezaei	Fencing	Men's team foil
Silver	Mojtaba Abedini	Fencing	Men's individual sabre
Silver	Mehdi Amirabadi; Hamid Azizzadeh; Sohrab Bakhtiarizadeh; Mohsen Bayatinia; Reza Enayati; Davoud Fanaei; Faraz Fatemi; Yahya Golmohammadi; Hossein Kaebi; Mahmoud Karimi; Hamed Kavianpour; Javad Kazemian; Rasoul Khatibi; Saeid Lotfi; Ebrahim Mirzapour; Moharram Navidkia; Javad Nekounam; Jalal Omidian; Afshin Peyrovani	Football	Men
Silver	Mahmoud Arab; Mahan Bajrang; Mohammad Hadi Ghasemi; Ahmad Majdi; Mehdi Niroumand; Mohammad Reza Samaei; Ali Shariati	Gymnastics	Men's team
Silver	Mohammad Hadi Ghasemi	Gymnastics	Men's individual all-around
Silver	Mohammad Hadi Ghasemi	Gymnastics	Men's horizontal bar
Silver	Majid Ashjaei; Amin Mazareei; Ebad Feizi	Karate	Men's kata team
Silver	Nasser Khajeh-Hosseini	Karate	Men's kumite +80 kg
Silver	Jasem Vishkaei	Karate	Men's kumite open
Bronze	Mohammad Reza Hedayati	Aquatics, Diving	Men's 1 m springboard
Bronze	Ghaem Mirabian	Aquatics, Diving	Men's 3 m springboard
Bronze	Baktash Gheidi	Aquatics, Swimming	Men's 100 m breaststroke
Bronze	Jalil Gomehei	Athletics	Men's 800 m
Bronze	Pendar Shoghian	Athletics	Men's pole vault
Bronze	Ali Rahmani	Athletics	Men's shot put
Bronze	Siamak Feiz-Asgari	Fencing	Men's individual épée
Bronze	Mohammad Rezaei	Fencing	Men's individual épée
Bronze	Keivan Javanshir	Fencing	Men's individual foil
Bronze	Hadi Mohammadzadeh	Fencing	Men's individual sabre
Bronze	Mahan Bajrang	Gymnastics	Men's rings
Bronze	Mohammad Hadi Ghasemi	Gymnastics	Men's parallel bars
Bronze	Mahan Bajrang	Gymnastics	Men's horizontal bar
Bronze	Alireza Katiraei	Karate	Men's kumite 70 kg
Bronze	Ali Shaterzadeh	Karate	Men's kumite 80 kg
Bronze	Mehdi Amouzadeh; Alireza Katiraei; Nasser Khajeh-Hosseini; Ali Shaterzadeh; Jasem Vishkaei	Karate	Men's kumite team
