= Diving at the 2002 West Asian Games =

- Venue: Fahad Al-Ahmad Swimming Complex
- Date: 4–7 April 2002

The Diving competition at the 2002 West Asian Games was held at Fahad Al-Ahmad Swimming Complex, Kuwait City, Kuwait from 4 to 7 April 2002.

== Medalists ==
Event	Gold	Silver	Bronze
1 m springboard	Mubarak Al-Nuaimi; Qatar	Abdulamir Al-Matrouk; Kuwait	Mohammad Reza Hedayati; Iran
3 m springboard	Abdulamir Al-Matrouk; Kuwait	Mubarak Al-Nuaimi; Qatar	Ghaem Mirabian; Iran
10 m platform	Abdulamir Al-Matrouk; Kuwait	Mubarak Al-Nuaimi; Qatar	Faisal Al-Baghli; Kuwait

== Medal table ==
Rank	Nation	Gold	Silver	Bronze	Total
1	Kuwait (KUW)	2	1	1	4
2	Qatar (QAT)	1	2	0	3
3	Iran (IRI)	0	0	2	2
Totals (3 entries)		3	3	3	9
