= Swimming at the 1998 Asian Games – Men's 100 metre butterfly =

Men's 100 metre butterfly at the 1998 Asian Games
- Venue: Thammasat Aquatic Center
- Date: 8 December 1998
- Competitors: 27 from 18 nations

Medalists
gold medal	Takashi Yamamoto	Japan
silver medal	Zhang Xiao	China
bronze medal	Han Kyu-chul	South Korea

The men's 100 metre butterfly swimming competition at the 1998 Asian Games in Bangkok was held on 8 December at the Thammasat Aquatic Center.

== Schedule ==
All times are Indochina Time (UTC+07:00)

Date	Time	Event
Tuesday, 8 December 1998	09:00	Heats
Tuesday, 8 December 1998	18:00	Finals

== Results ==
Legend

- DNS — Did not start

=== Heats ===
Rank	Heat	Athlete	Time	Notes
1	4	Takashi Yamamoto (JPN)	54.20	
2	2	Zhang Xiao (CHN)	55.01	
3	4	Han Kyu-chul (KOR)	55.86	
4	3	Ravil Nachaev (UZB)	55.94	
5	3	Zhang Qiang (CHN)	56.05	
6	4	Andrey Gavrilov (KAZ)	56.09	
7	3	Dulyarit Phuangthong (THA)	56.28	
8	2	Hisayoshi Tanaka (JPN)	56.33	
9	2	Tseng Cheng-hua (TPE)	56.35	
10	1	Hung Chien-chih (TPE)	56.40	
11	3	Konstantin Andriushin (KGZ)	56.41	
12	2	Nuttapol Chavanavanichwoot (THA)	56.53	
13	2	Kim Min-suk (KOR)	57.17	
14	4	Jonathan Chua (SIN)	58.14	
15	2	Fadi Kouzmah (SYR)	59.14	
16	4	Tang Chon Kit (MAC)	59.52	
17	4	Charles Szeto (HKG)	59.82	
18	3	Ghefari Dulapandan (SRI)	1:00.10	
19	3	Nayef Al-Hasawi (KUW)	1:00.48	
20	2	Gihan Ranatunga (SRI)	1:00.73	
21	2	Hamid Reza Mobarrez (IRI)	1:00.88	
22	4	Abdul Hamid Ripon (BAN)	1:01.45	
23	3	Pirouz Eftekhar-Manavi (IRI)	1:01.76	
24	3	Thamer Al-Shamroukh (KUW)	1:02.83	
—	1	Obeid Al-Rumaithi (UAE)	DNS	
—	1	Arthur Li (HKG)	DNS	
—	4	Kamal Masud (PAK)	DNS	

=== Finals ===
==== Final B ====
Rank	Athlete	Time	Notes
1	Tseng Cheng-hua (TPE)	56.23	
2	Hung Chien-chih (TPE)	56.25	
3	Kim Min-suk (KOR)	56.29	
4	Nuttapol Chavanavanichwoot (THA)	56.50	
5	Konstantin Andriushin (KGZ)	56.90	
6	Jonathan Chua (SIN)	58.64	
7	Tang Chon Kit (MAC)	59.08	
8	Fadi Kouzmah (SYR)	59.34	

==== Final A ====
Rank	Athlete	Time	Notes
1st place, gold medalist(s)	Takashi Yamamoto (JPN)	53.34	GR
2nd place, silver medalist(s)	Zhang Xiao (CHN)	54.40	
3rd place, bronze medalist(s)	Han Kyu-chul (KOR)	54.83	
4	Zhang Qiang (CHN)	55.22	
5	Andrey Gavrilov (KAZ)	55.41	
6	Hisayoshi Tanaka (JPN)	56.07	
7	Ravil Nachaev (UZB)	56.36	
8	Dulyarit Phuangthong (THA)	56.43	
