= Fencing at the 2002 West Asian Games =

- Venue: Yarmouk Hall
- Date: 4–7 April 2002

The Fencing competition at the 2002 West Asian Games was held at the Yarmouk Hall, Kuwait City, Kuwait. It had a men's only programm in all three fencing weapons.

== Medalists ==
Event	Gold	Silver	Bronze
Individual épée	Farhad Rezaei; Iran	Hasan Malallah; Kuwait	Mohammad Rezaei; Iran
Individual épée	Farhad Rezaei; Iran	Hasan Malallah; Kuwait	Siamak Feiz-Asgari; Iran
Team épée	Kuwait	Iran	Jordan
Individual foil	Abdulmohsen Shahrayen; Kuwait	Othman Al-Shammari; Kuwait	Keivan Javanshir; Iran
Individual foil	Abdulmohsen Shahrayen; Kuwait	Othman Al-Shammari; Kuwait	Saoud Al-Zamel; Kuwait
Team foil	Kuwait	Iran	Jordan
Individual sabre	Peyman Fakhri; Iran	Mojtaba Abedini; Iran	Hadi Mohammadzadeh; Iran
Individual sabre	Peyman Fakhri; Iran	Mojtaba Abedini; Iran	Fahad Al-Adwani; Kuwait
Team sabre	Iran	Kuwait	Jordan

== Medal table ==
Rank	Nation	Gold	Silver	Bronze	Total
1	Iran (IRI)	3	3	4	10
2	Kuwait (KUW)	3	3	2	8
3	Jordan (JOR)	0	0	3	3
Totals (3 entries)		6	6	9	21
