= Wrestling at the 1997 West Asian Games =

- Venue: Shohada 7th Tir Stadium
- Date: 22–23 November 1997

Wrestling was one of the many sports which was held at the 1997 West Asian Games in Tehran, Iran between 22 and 23 November 1997. The competition took place at Mohammad Reza Shah Stadium.

== Medalists ==
=== Freestyle ===
| Event | Gold | Silver | Bronze |
|---|---|---|---|
| 54 kg | Abbas Bandsazi; Iran | Ahmad Davlatov; Tajikistan | Aşirmuhammet Çaryýew; Turkmenistan |
| 58 kg | Hossein Karimi; Iran | Badie Reihani; Syria | Döwletberdi Kasimow; Turkmenistan |
| 63 kg | Mohsen Naderi; Iran | Ayman Al-Shalabi; Syria | Alai Niýazmengliýew; Turkmenistan |
| 69 kg | Ahmad Al-Osta; Syria | H. Taganow; Turkmenistan | Alireza Bahabasteh; Iran |
| 76 kg | Hossein Tatari; Iran | Mohammad Al-Khanati; Syria | Oleg Kadyrow; Turkmenistan |
| 85 kg | Ildar Saifulin; Turkmenistan | Hossein Rastegar; Iran | Jalal Baker; Syria |
| 97 kg | Mohammad Javad Rasekhi; Iran | Abdurazzaq Alimov; Tajikistan | None awarded |
| 130 kg | Hamid Ghashang; Iran | Adnan Al-Haiek; Syria | Nasser Bechara; Lebanon |

=== Greco-Roman ===
| Event | Gold | Silver | Bronze |
|---|---|---|---|
| 54 kg | Uran Kalilov; Kyrgyzstan | Behrouz Heidarzadeh; Iran | Nepes Gukulow; Turkmenistan |
| 58 kg | Khaled Al-Faraj; Syria | Abdolsaheb Heidarzadeh; Iran | Döwletberdi Mamedow; Turkmenistan |
| 63 kg | Nurjan Jusupov; Kyrgyzstan | Zakaria Nashed; Syria | Gholam Jahanbakhshi; Iran |
| 69 kg | Afshin Mirsalehi; Iran | Yahya Ayoub; Syria | Auaz Ordobaev; Kyrgyzstan |
| 76 kg | Mohammad Al-Ken; Syria | Haýder Çaryýew; Turkmenistan | Azamat Helmabekov; Kyrgyzstan |
| 85 kg | Abdoljabbar Heidarzadeh; Iran | Mohanad Mando; Syria | Mergen Sahatow; Turkmenistan |
| 97 kg | Rasoul Jazini; Iran | Rozy Rejepow; Turkmenistan | Mohammad Al-Haiek; Syria |
| 130 kg | Hassan Ramdoun; Syria | Mehdi Karimi; Iran | Igor Grigorýan; Turkmenistan |

== Medal table ==
| Rank | Nation | Gold | Silver | Bronze | Total |
|---|---|---|---|---|---|
| 1 | Iran (IRI) | 9 | 4 | 2 | 15 |
| 2 | Syria (SYR) | 4 | 7 | 2 | 13 |
| 3 | Kyrgyzstan (KGZ) | 2 | 0 | 2 | 4 |
| 4 | Turkmenistan (TKM) | 1 | 3 | 8 | 12 |
| 5 | Tajikistan (TJK) | 0 | 2 | 0 | 2 |
| 6 | Lebanon (LIB) | 0 | 0 | 1 | 1 |
| Totals (6 entries) | | 16 | 16 | 15 | 47 |
