= Khaled Al-Faraj =

Syrian Greco-Roman wrestler

Personal information
- Born: 19 January 1970 (age 56) Saraqib, Syria
- Height: 1.55 m (5 ft 1 in)
- Weight: 48 kg (106 lb)

Sport
- Sport: Greco-Roman wrestling
- Club: Army Adlip
- Coached by: Mahmod Alpalah
Medal record
Men's Greco-Roman wrestling
Representing Syria
World Championships
| Bronze medal – third place | 1998 Gävle | 54 kg |
Asian Games
| Silver medal – second place | 1994 Hiroshima | 52 kg |
Asian Championships
| Gold medal – first place | 1992 Tehran | 52 kg |
| Gold medal – first place | 1995 Manila | 52 kg |
| Gold medal – first place | 1996 Xiaoshan | 52 kg |
West Asian Games
| Gold medal – first place | 1997 Tehran | 58 kg |
Mediterranean Games
| Gold medal – first place | 1987 Latakia | 48 kg |
| Gold medal – first place | 1991 Athens | 52 kg |
| Gold medal – first place | 1993 Languedoc | 52 kg |
| Gold medal – first place | 1997 Bari | 54 kg |
Pan Arab Games
| Gold medal – first place | 1992 Damascus | 57 kg |
| Gold medal – first place | 1997 Beirut | 57 kg |

Khaled Al-Faraj (Arabic: خالد الفرج; born 19 January 1970) is a retired Greco-Roman wrestler from Syria. He represented his country at the 1988 Summer Olympics as a light flyweight (-48 kg), finishing 5th, and then in 1992 and 1996 as a flyweight (-52 kg), finishing in 11th and 15th place, respectively.

He is also the only Syrian to ever medal at the World Wrestling Championships, winning a bronze in 1998 in Gävle, Sweden at 54 kg.
