= Fadi Kouzmah =

Syrian swimmer

Personal information
- Full name: Fadi Kouzmah
- National team: Syria
- Born: 13 May 1983 (age 43)
- Height: 1.75 m (5 ft 9 in)
- Weight: 67 kg (148 lb)

Sport
- Sport: Swimming
- Strokes: Butterfly
Medal record
Men's swimming
Representing Syria
West Asian Games
Gold medal – first place	1997 Tehran	200 m freestyle
Gold medal – first place	2002 Kuwait	200 m freestyle
Gold medal – first place	2002 Kuwait	400 m freestyle
Gold medal – first place	2002 Kuwait	200 m butterfly
Silver medal – second place	1997 Tehran	200 m butterfly
Silver medal – second place	2002 Kuwait	4×200 freestyle relay
Bronze medal – third place	1997 Tehran	400 m freestyle
Bronze medal – third place	1997 Tehran	100 m butterfly
Bronze medal – third place	1997 Tehran	4×200 freestyle relay

Fadi Kouzmah (Arabic: فادي كوزما; born May 13, 1983) is a Syrian former swimmer, who specialized in butterfly events. Kouzmah qualified only for the men's 200 m butterfly at the 2000 Summer Olympics in Sydney by receiving a Universality place from FINA, without meeting an entry time. He challenged five other swimmers in heat one, including Ecuador's two-time Olympian Roberto Delgado. He rounded out the field to last place with a slowest time of 2:11.56. Kouzmah failed to advance into the semifinals, as he placed forty-sixth overall in the prelims.
