= Judo at the 1997 West Asian Games =

Judo competition

- Venue: Heidarnia Hall
- Date: 27–28 November 1997

Judo was one of the many sports which was held at the 1997 West Asian Games in Tehran, Iran between 27 and 28 November 1997. The competition took place at the Heidarnia Hall.

== Medalists ==
Event	Gold	Silver	Bronze
Extra lightweight (−60 kg)	Rustam Boqiev; Tajikistan	Ali Ibrahim; Syria	A. Jabarow; Turkmenistan
Extra lightweight (−60 kg)	Rustam Boqiev; Tajikistan	Ali Ibrahim; Syria	Tariel Kaziev; Kyrgyzstan
Half lightweight (−65 kg)	Guwanç Nurmuhammedow; Turkmenistan	Shahram Shahbazi; Iran	Alisher Karimov; Tajikistan
Half lightweight (−65 kg)	Guwanç Nurmuhammedow; Turkmenistan	Shahram Shahbazi; Iran	Naser Abdullah; Kuwait
Lightweight (−71 kg)	Azhar Jalilati; Syria	Charles Daniel; Lebanon	Ruslan Hematov; Tajikistan
Lightweight (−71 kg)	Azhar Jalilati; Syria	Charles Daniel; Lebanon	Amir Reza Ghomi; Iran
Half middleweight (−78 kg)	Ali Chamanpa; Iran	Hussein Muminov; Tajikistan	Musa Khalaf; Jordan
Half middleweight (−78 kg)	Ali Chamanpa; Iran	Hussein Muminov; Tajikistan	Khaled Al-Anezi; Kuwait
Middleweight (−86 kg)	Masoud Khosravinejad; Iran	Yaser Al-Hamwy; Syria	Evgeny Grigoriev; Kyrgyzstan
Middleweight (−86 kg)	Masoud Khosravinejad; Iran	Yaser Al-Hamwy; Syria	Jahongir Abdulloev; Tajikistan
Half heavyweight (−95 kg)	Farhad Maabi; Iran	Fakhriddin Rakhimov; Tajikistan	Hussain Safar; Kuwait
Half heavyweight (−95 kg)	Farhad Maabi; Iran	Fakhriddin Rakhimov; Tajikistan	Andre Akoury; Lebanon
Heavyweight (+95 kg)	Mohammad Zakkour; Syria	Ghasem Ardabili; Iran	Magomed Esmurziev; Kyrgyzstan
Heavyweight (+95 kg)	Mohammad Zakkour; Syria	Ghasem Ardabili; Iran	Rudy Hachache; Lebanon
Openweight	Mohammad Zakkour; Syria	Jahongir Abdulloev; Tajikistan	Magomed Esmurziev; Kyrgyzstan
Openweight	Mohammad Zakkour; Syria	Jahongir Abdulloev; Tajikistan	Fadi Saikali; Lebanon

== Medal table ==
Rank	Nation	Gold	Silver	Bronze	Total
1	Iran (IRI)	3	2	1	6
2	Syria (SYR)	3	2	0	5
3	Tajikistan (TJK)	1	3	3	7
4	Turkmenistan (TKM)	1	0	1	2
5	Lebanon (LIB)	0	1	3	4
6	Kyrgyzstan (KGZ)	0	0	4	4
7	Kuwait (KUW)	0	0	3	3
8	Jordan (JOR)	0	0	1	1
Totals (8 entries)		8	8	16	32
