= Athletics at the 1997 West Asian Games =

- Venue: Azadi Stadium

At the 1997 West Asian Games. the athletics events were held in Tehran, Iran in November 1997. It had a men's only programme containing twenty-two track and field events. All performances were affected by the altitude of the host city (3,900 ft; 1,200 m).

The host nation dominated the proceedings, winning half of the gold medals on offer (11) and more than half of the total medals with its haul of 38 medals. Kuwait was a comfortable second with eight golds among its fifteen medals, while Jordan was a distant third with one gold in its total of five medals. Seven nations reached the medal table in the athletics competition.

The competition was of a relatively low standard for an international athletics meet. Virtually all the performances were closer to the level expected in elite women's competitions. Among the better performers were Maksim Smetanin, a 1996 Olympian from Kyrgyzstan who won the triple jump with 15.90 metres. Two young athletes in the throws discus thrower Abbas Samimi (aged 20), sprinter Fawzi Al-Shammari (aged 18) and hammer thrower Dilshod Nazarov (aged 15) secured their first major medals at an international meeting – all went on to claim multiple medals at the Asian Games and Asian Athletics Championships later in their careers.

== Medalists ==
Event	Gold		Silver		Bronze	
100 m	Musaed Al-Azemi; Kuwait	10.83	Abdolghaffar Saghar; Iran	10.87	Fawzi Al-Shammari; Kuwait	11.05
200 m	Khaled Al-Johar; Kuwait	21.34	Musaed Al-Azemi; Kuwait	21.37	Maisam Delvarian; Iran	22.05
400 m	Khaled Al-Johar; Kuwait	46.51	Fawzi Al-Shammari; Kuwait	48.17	Mehdi Jelodarzadeh; Iran	49.07
800 m	Mohammad Reza Molaei; Iran	1:54.40	Boris Kaveshnikov; Kyrgyzstan	1:54.73	Mehdi Jelodarzadeh; Iran	1:55.58
1500 m	Ahmad Yazdanian; Iran	3:57.74	Farhad Heidari; Iran	3:58.24	Rasoul Mohammadbeigi; Iran	4:14.33
5000 m	Jafar Babakhani; Iran	14:39.04	Awad Al-Hasini; Jordan	14:43.94	Ahmad Zarekar; Iran	14:45.57
10,000 m	Ahmad Zarekar; Iran	30:32.38	Awad Al-Hasini; Jordan	30:56.80	Ebrahim Etaati; Iran	31:15.01
110 m hurdles	Bader Abbas; Kuwait	14.42	Zeyad Abdulrazak; Kuwait	14.70	Fadin Mohammadzadeh; Iran	14.92
400 m hurdles	Hamid Reza Fardinpour; Iran	52.53	Majid Foroutannia; Iran	53.49	Baýmyrat Aşirmyradow; Turkmenistan	54.35
3000 m steeplechase	Jafar Babakhani; Iran	9:12.10	Abolfazl Mahmoudian; Iran	9:12.17	Karim Seyedin; Iran	10:25.26
4 × 100 m relay	Kuwait	42.09	Iran	43.87	Turkmenistan	43.92
4 × 400 m relay	Kuwait	3:11.63	Iran	3:13.93	Turkmenistan	3:32.37
10,000 m walk	Gholamreza Zare; Iran	45:34	Ahmad Fazeli; Iran	46:55	Hamid Reza Kahrizi; Iran	47:23
High jump	Fakhredin Fouad; Jordan	2.10	Hassan Banitorfi; Iran	2.00	Juma Niýazow; Turkmenistan	1.95
High jump	Fakhredin Fouad; Jordan	2.10	Hassan Banitorfi; Iran	2.00	Alireza Ghiasi; Iran	1.95
Pole vault	Hassan Mirseifi; Iran	4.20	Mehdi Mobini; Iran	4.20	Abdolmajid Sotoudehnia; Iran	4.10
Long jump	Khaled Al-Bakheet; Kuwait	7.35	Husein Al-Youhah; Kuwait	7.19	Aleksandr Tumanow; Turkmenistan	6.79
Triple jump	Maksim Smetanin; Kyrgyzstan	15.90	Mehrzad Charkhian; Iran	15.75	Khaled Al-Bakheet; Kuwait	15.35
Shot put	Ali Rahmani; Iran	16.97	Ali Sayyah; Iran	16.51	Tareq Al-Najjar; Jordan	15.80
Discus throw	Abbas Samimi; Iran	52.90	Tareq Al-Najjar; Jordan	51.90	Fariborz Malek; Iran	51.04
Hammer throw	Naser Al-Jarallah; Kuwait	64.06	Ghorban Salahi; Iran	63.80	Dilshod Nazarov; Tajikistan	59.94
Javelin throw	Firas Al-Mahamid; Syria	71.10	Ghanem Zaid; Kuwait	65.94	Danghatar Yaghouti; Iran	65.84
Decathlon	Ali Feizi; Iran	6213	Abdollah Hedayati; Iran	5958	Hamid Asiabi; Iran	5935

== Medal table ==
Rank	Nation	Gold	Silver	Bronze	Total
1	Iran (IRI)	11	13	14	38
2	Kuwait (KUW)	8	5	2	15
3	Jordan (JOR)	1	3	1	5
4	Kyrgyzstan (KGZ)	1	1	0	2
5	Syria (SYR)	1	0	0	1
6	Turkmenistan (TKM)	0	0	5	5
7	Tajikistan (TJK)	0	0	1	1
Totals (7 entries)		22	22	23	67
