= Awad Al-Hasini =

Jordanian long-distance runner

Personal information
- Full name: Awad Sress Al-Hasini
- Nationality: Jordanian
- Born: 15 February 1967 (age 59)

Sport
- Sport: Long-distance running
- Event: 5000 metres
Medal record
Men's athletics
Representing Jordan
West Asian Games
Silver medal – second place	1997 Tehran	5000 m
Silver medal – second place	1997 Tehran	10,000 m

Awad Sress Al-Hasini (born 15 February 1967) is a Jordanian long-distance runner. He competed in the men's 5000 metres and 10,000 metres at the 1992 Summer Olympics.

On 12 April 1992, Al-Hasini ran 1:05:04 hours at the inaugural Nice Half Marathon, finishing in 2nd place. Al-Hasini set further Jordanian records in both the 5000 m and 10,000 m at the 1994 Asian Games, running times of 14:07.46 and 29:24.35 to finish 9th and 6th respectively. At the 1995 World Championships in Athletics, Al-Hasini ran 14:38.15 to finish 15th. Al-Hasini won silver medals in the 5000 m and 10,000 m at the 1997 West Asian Games.
