= Nader Mohammadkhani =

Iranian footballer

Personal information
- Full name: Nader Mohammadkhani
- Date of birth: August 23, 1963 (age 63)
- Place of birth: Tehran, Iran
- Height: 1.85 m (6 ft 1 in)
- Position: Defender

Senior career*
Years	Team	Apps	(Gls)
1984–1987	Vahdat		
1987–1988	Persepolis		
1988–1990	Gostaresh		
1990–1991	Persepolis		
1991–1994	Keshavarz		
1994–1997	Bahman		
1997–1998	Polyacryl Esfahan		
1998–2000	Persepolis		
2000	Qatar SC		
2001	Pas		
2001–2002	Sanat Naft Abadan		

International career^{‡}
1988–1999	Iran	64	(1)
- * Club domestic league appearances and goals as of 23 October 2011 ‡ National team caps and goals as of 21 February 2007

Nader Mohammadkhani (Persian: نادر محمدخانی, born August 23, 1963, in Tehran) is a retired Iranian football player.

He played for the Iran national football team and was a participant at the 1998 FIFA World Cup. On 21 January 2000 he officially retired at half-time during a testimonial match (Iran vs Asia All-Stars).

== Honours ==
=== Club ===
Persepolis

- Tehran Province League (2): 1987-88, 1990–91
- Asian Cup Winners' Cup (1): 1990-91
- Iranian Football League (2): 1998–99, 1999–2000
- Hazfi Cup (2): 1987–88, 1998–99

Bahman

- Hazfi Cup (1): 1994–95

=== National ===
Iran

- Asian Games Gold Medal (2): 1990, 1998

== Career statistics ==
=== International goals ===
#	Date	Venue	Opponent	Score	Result	Competition
1.	15 February 1999	Mohammed Al-Hamad Stadium, Kuwait City, Kuwait	Kuwait	2–1	W	1999 Ciao February Cup
Correct as of 24 July 2021
