= Fencing at the 1997 West Asian Games =

- Venue: 13th Rajab Sport Hall

Fencing at the 1997 West Asian Games was held at the 13th Rajab Sport Hall, Tehran, Iran. It had a men's only programm in all three fencing weapons.

== Medalists ==
Event	Gold	Silver	Bronze
Individual épée	Aleksandr Poddubny; Kyrgyzstan	Farhad Rezaei; Iran	Mohammad Hossein Abedi; Iran
Individual épée	Aleksandr Poddubny; Kyrgyzstan	Farhad Rezaei; Iran	Hasan Malallah; Kuwait
Team épée	Kyrgyzstan	Kuwait	Iran
Individual foil	Abdulmohsen Shahrayen; Kuwait	Mohammad Mirmohammadi; Iran	Hamid Reza Veisi; Iran
Individual foil	Abdulmohsen Shahrayen; Kuwait	Mohammad Mirmohammadi; Iran	H. Shahrayen; Kuwait
Team foil	Kuwait	Iran	Turkmenistan
Individual sabre	Peyman Fakhri; Iran	Pasha Pashapour; Iran	Abbas Sheikholeslami; Iran
Individual sabre	Peyman Fakhri; Iran	Pasha Pashapour; Iran	Abdulkarim Al-Shamlan; Kuwait
Team sabre	Iran	Kuwait	Kyrgyzstan

== Medal table ==
Rank	Nation	Gold	Silver	Bronze	Total
1	Iran (IRI)	2	4	4	10
2	Kuwait (KUW)	2	2	3	7
3	Kyrgyzstan (KGZ)	2	0	1	3
4	Turkmenistan (TKM)	0	0	1	1
Totals (4 entries)		6	6	9	21
