= Shooting at the 1997 West Asian Games =

- Venue: Azadi Sport Complex

Shooting sports at the 1997 West Asian Games was held at the Azadi Sport Complex, Tehran, Iran. It had a men's only programme containing 14 events.

== Medalists ==
Event	Gold	Silver	Bronze
10 m air pistol	Yuri Melentiev; Kyrgyzstan	Sergey Nikishov; Kyrgyzstan	Boris Kadyrow; Turkmenistan
10 m air pistol team	Kyrgyzstan	Kuwait	Iran
25 m center fire pistol	Nurmyrat Hanow; Turkmenistan	Saeed Al-Kurbi; Qatar	Zafer Al-Qahtani; Qatar
25 m center fire pistol team	Turkmenistan	Iran	Qatar
25 m standard pistol	Ahmad Samaei; Iran	Ghanim Al-Naemi; Qatar	Yuri Melentiev; Kyrgyzstan
25 m standard pistol team	Qatar	Iran	Turkmenistan
50 m pistol	Yuri Melentiev; Kyrgyzstan	Boris Kadyrow; Turkmenistan	Dmitru Kuznetsov; Kyrgyzstan
50 m pistol team	Kyrgyzstan	Turkmenistan	Qatar
10 m air rifle	Yuri Lomov; Kyrgyzstan	Igor Pirekeýew; Turkmenistan	Abdulnasser Al-Shaiba; Qatar
10 m air rifle team	Kyrgyzstan	Qatar	Iran
50 m rifle prone	Igor Pirekeýew; Turkmenistan	Yuri Lomov; Kyrgyzstan	Abdulnasser Al-Shaiba; Qatar
50 m rifle prone team	Kyrgyzstan	Qatar	Iran
50 m rifle 3 positions	Aleksandr Minin; Kyrgyzstan	Igor Pirekeýew; Turkmenistan	Abdulnasser Al-Shaiba; Qatar
50 m rifle 3 positions team	Kyrgyzstan	Qatar	Iran

== Medal table ==
Rank	Nation	Gold	Silver	Bronze	Total
1	Kyrgyzstan (KGZ)	9	2	2	13
2	Turkmenistan (TKM)	3	4	2	9
3	Qatar (QAT)	1	5	6	12
4	Iran (IRI)	1	2	4	7
5	Kuwait (KUW)	0	1	0	1
Totals (5 entries)		14	14	14	42
