= Football at the 2002 West Asian Games =

West Asian Games Football competition

- Venue: Mohammed Al-Hamad Stadium
- Date: 4–12 April 2002

The football tournament at the 2002 West Asian Games took place from 4 to 12 April 2002. It was originally scheduled for October 2001, but was postponed due to the September 11 attacks. Oman were originally scheduled to take part in group A along with Kuwait and Qatar but withdrew and the format was changed to round robin. All matches was played at the Mohammed Al-Hamad Stadium.

Kuwait won the gold medal, Iran and Syria were tied on second place, the silver medal was decided by a coin toss.

== Results ==
| Pos | Team | Pld | W | D | L | GF | GA | GD | Pts |
|---|---|---|---|---|---|---|---|---|---|
| 1 | Kuwait | 4 | 2 | 2 | 0 | 11 | 2 | +9 | 8 |
| 2 | Iran B | 4 | 1 | 3 | 0 | 5 | 4 | +1 | 6 |
| 3 | Syria U20 | 4 | 1 | 3 | 0 | 5 | 4 | +1 | 6 |
| 4 | Palestine U23 | 4 | 1 | 1 | 2 | 5 | 11 | −6 | 4 |
| 5 | Qatar U23 | 4 | 0 | 1 | 3 | 3 | 8 | −5 | 1 |

Source: Second West Asian Games
4 April
17:15

| Iran | 2–2 | Palestine U23 |
|---|---|---|
| Bayatinia 9'; Enayati 89' | | Awad 31'; Al-Kord 75' |

Mohammed Al-Hamad Stadium, Kuwait City

4 April
19:45

| Kuwait | 3–1 | Qatar U23 |
|---|---|---|
| Laheeb 37', 59', 90+2' | | Hamed 56' |

Mohammed Al-Hamad Stadium, Kuwait City

6 April
17:15

| Palestine U23 | 2–0 | Qatar U23 |
|---|---|---|
| Al-Kord 26', 54' |

Mohammed Al-Hamad Stadium, Kuwait City

6 April
19:45

| Kuwait | 1–1 | Syria U20 |
|---|---|---|
| Al-Shammari 32' (pen.) | | Al-Rashed 21' |

Mohammed Al-Hamad Stadium, Kuwait City

8 April
17:15

| Qatar U23 | 1–2 | Iran |
|---|---|---|
| Hassan 22' | | Kazemian 9'; Nekounam 85' |

Mohammed Al-Hamad Stadium, Kuwait City

8 April
19:45

| Syria U20 | 2–1 | Palestine U23 |
|---|---|---|
| Habib 23'; Rafe 89' | | Ayoub 48' |

Mohammed Al-Hamad Stadium, Kuwait City

10 April
17:15

| Iran | 1–1 | Syria U20 |
|---|---|---|
| Nekounam 37' | | Rafe 84' |

Mohammed Al-Hamad Stadium, Kuwait City

10 April
19:45

| Kuwait | 7–0 | Palestine U23 |
|---|---|---|
| Najem 14'; Laheeb 21'; Al-Tayyar 32'; Al-Failakawi 77'; Al-Salamah 79', 87'; Al-Buraiki 84' (pen.) |

Mohammed Al-Hamad Stadium, Kuwait City

12 April
17:15

| Qatar U23 | 1–1 | Syria U20 |
|---|---|---|
| Abdulrahman 61' | | Rafe 43' |

Mohammed Al-Hamad Stadium, Kuwait City

12 April
19:45

| Kuwait | 0–0 | Iran |

Mohammed Al-Hamad Stadium, Kuwait City
