= Table tennis at the 1997 West Asian Games =

- Venue: Azadi Sport Complex

Table tennis at the 1997 West Asian Games was held at the Azadi Sport Complex, Tehran, Iran. It had a men's only program.

== Medalists ==
Event	Gold	Silver	Bronze
Singles	Mohammad Bayrampour; Iran	Foad Kaseb; Iran	Behnam Rahmatpanah; Iran
Singles	Mohammad Bayrampour; Iran	Foad Kaseb; Iran	Reza Faraji; Iran
Doubles	Iran; Shahram Sarbakhshian; Mohammad Reza Akhlaghpasand	Iran; Mojtaba Amini; Reza Faraji	Iran; Akbar Bahmani; Behnam Rahmatpanah
Doubles	Iran; Shahram Sarbakhshian; Mohammad Reza Akhlaghpasand	Iran; Mojtaba Amini; Reza Faraji	Tajikistan; Sadi Saidov; Sirojiddin Ismoilov
Team	Iran; Akbar Bahmani; Mohammad Bayrampour; Reza Faraji; Foad Kaseb; Behnam Rahmatpanah	Turkmenistan	Tajikistan; Sirojiddin Ismoilov; Sadi Saidov

== Medal table ==
Rank	Nation	Gold	Silver	Bronze	Total
1	Iran (IRI)	3	2	3	8
2	Turkmenistan (TKM)	0	1	0	1
3	Tajikistan (TJK)	0	0	2	2
Totals (3 entries)		3	3	5	11
