= Mehdi Salehpour =

Iranian footballer (born 1975)

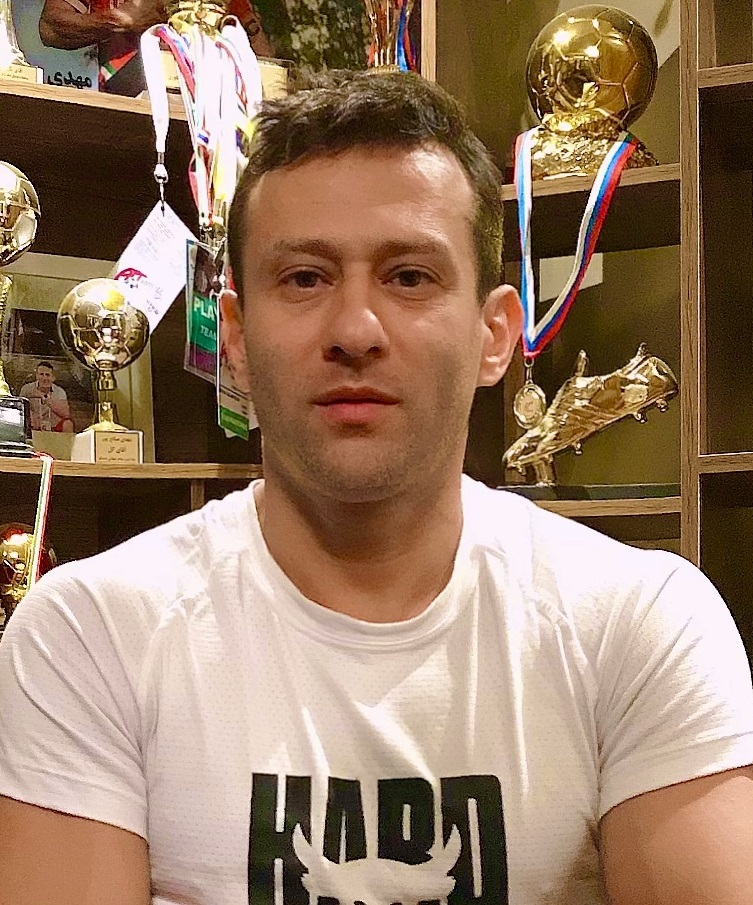

Personal information
- Date of birth: August 25, 1975 (age 51)
- Place of birth: Tehran, Iran
- Height: 1.82 m (6 ft 0 in)
- Position: Forward

Senior career*
Years	Team	Apps	(Gls)
1996–2000	Shahin	88	(69)
2000–2001	Esteghlal	36	(12)
2001–2002	Paykan	44	(16)
2002–2003	Masafi Club	36	(22)
2003–2004	Azarbayejan	19	(23)
2004–2005	Persepolis	26	(10)
2005–2020	Iranian artists	695	(620)
- * Club domestic league appearances and goals

Mehdi Salehpour (Persian: مهدی صالح‌پور, born August 25, 1975, in Tehran) is an Iranian footballer. He has played for both Esteghlal and Persepolis. He won 2001–02 Hazfi Cup with Esteghlal and played for Persepolis in 2004–05 Iran Pro League. He also plays for "Honarmandan Team", a team consisted of Iranian actors that plays in Charity matches.
