= Amir Vaziri =

Iranian footballer

Personal information
- Full name: Amir Vaziri
- Date of birth: February 5, 1978 (age 48)
- Place of birth: Iran
- Position: Striker

Senior career*
Years	Team	Apps	(Gls)
?–2001	Fajr Sepasi		
2001–2004	Zob Ahan FC	?	(15)
2004–2005	Paykan Tehran	25	(6)
2005–2008	Saipa F.C.	68	(15)
2008–2009	Esteghlal Ahvaz	12	(1)
- * Club domestic league appearances and goals as of 6 October 2009

Amir Vaziri (Persian: امیر وزیری, born February 5, 1978) is an Iranian footballer who plays for Esteghlal Ahvaz as a striker.

== Club career ==
Having played for Zob Ahan FC in the Iranian Premier League for three years, in 2004 he moved to Tehrani club Paykan F.C., where he stayed only for season 2004/05. In 2005, he moved to another car industry sponsored club, Saipa F.C. In season 2005/06 he made 29 appearances for his club, scoring 7 goals.

Season	Team	Country	Division	Apps	Goals	Assists
99/00	Fajr Sepasi	Iran	1	?	3	?
00/01	Fajr Sepasi	Iran	1	?	8	?
01/02	Zob Ahan	Iran	1	?	5	?
02/03	Zob Ahan	Iran	1	?	3	?
03/04	Zob Ahan	Iran	1	?	7	?
04/05	Paykan	Iran	1	25	6	?
05/06	Saipa	Iran	1	29	7	2
06/07	Saipa	Iran	1	20	4	0
07/08	Saipa	Iran	1	19	2	0
08/09	Esteghlal Ahvaz	Iran	1	12	1	0
