= Konstantin Priahin =

Kyrgyzstani swimmer (born 1973)

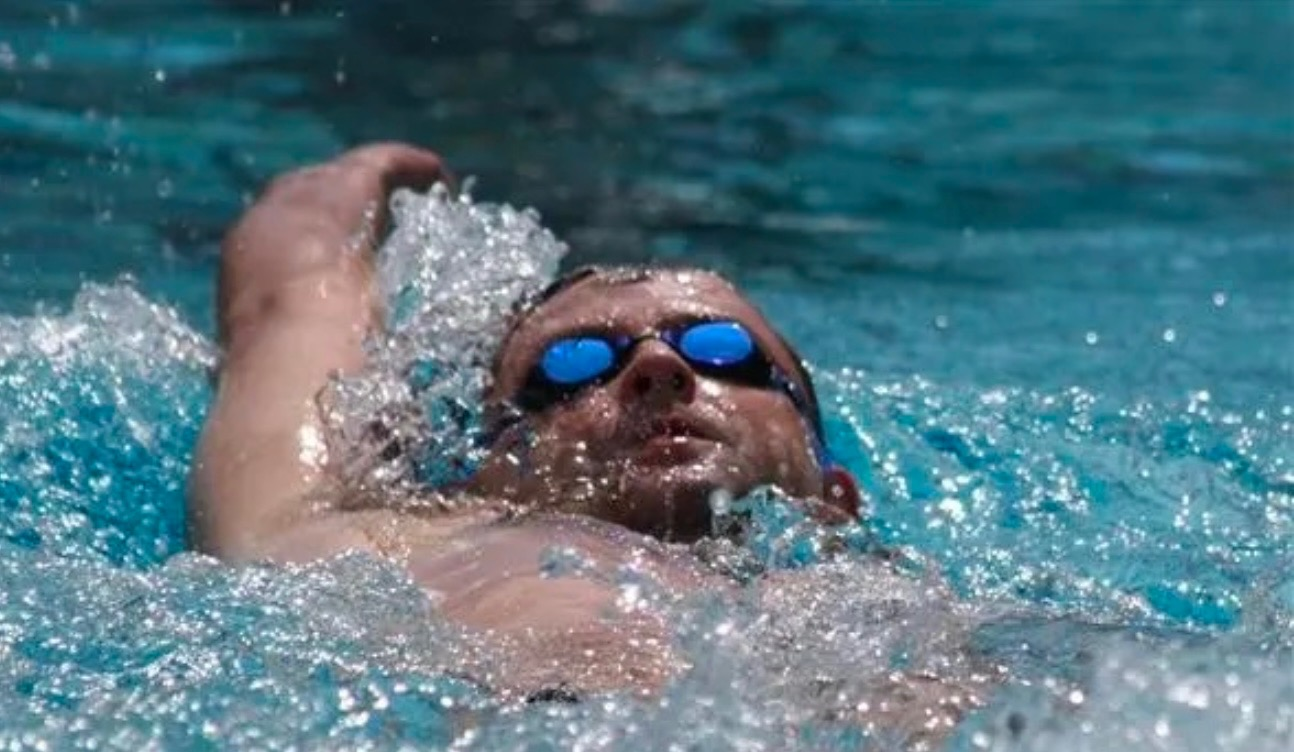
- Priahin swimming the backstroke.

Personal information
- Born: February 11, 1973 (age 53)

Sport
- Sport: Swimming

Konstantin Priahin (Russian: Константин Пряхин; born February 11, 1973) is a Kyrgyzstani former swimmer, who specialized in backstroke events. He represented Kyrgyzstan in two editions of the Olympic Games (1996 and 2000).

Priahin made his official debut at the 1996 Summer Olympics in Atlanta. He failed to reach the top 16 final in the 100 m backstroke, finishing forty-fifth in a time of 1:00.26. A member of the Kyrgyzstan team, he also placed twenty-first, along with Konstantin Andriushin, Yevgeny Petrashov, and Russian import Sergey Ashihmin, in the 4×100 m medley relay (3:56.24).

At the 2000 Summer Olympics in Sydney, Priahin competed only in the men's 100 m backstroke. He eclipsed a FINA B-cut of 58.05 from the Kazakhstan Open Championships in Almaty. He challenged seven other swimmers in heat two, including South Korea's 17-year-old Sung Min. He registered a lifetime best of 59.86 to overhaul a minute barrier and pick up a seventh seed, finishing behind leader Sung by 2.71 seconds. Priahin failed to advance into the semifinals, as he placed forty-ninth overall in the prelims.

== Pictures ==
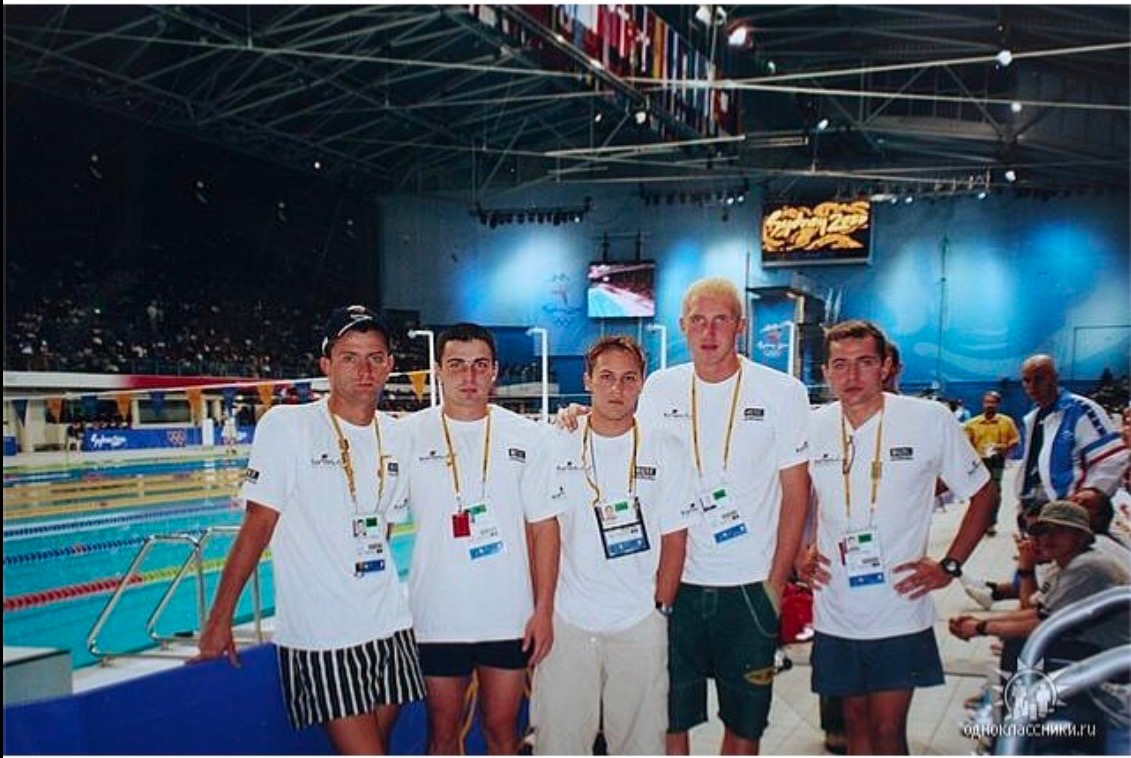
File:Sydney_2000_Summer_Olympics_Group_Photo.jpgPhoto: Left to Right: Konstantin Priahin, Yevgeny Petrashov, Konstantin Andriushin, Sergey Ashihmin, Alexander Egorov.

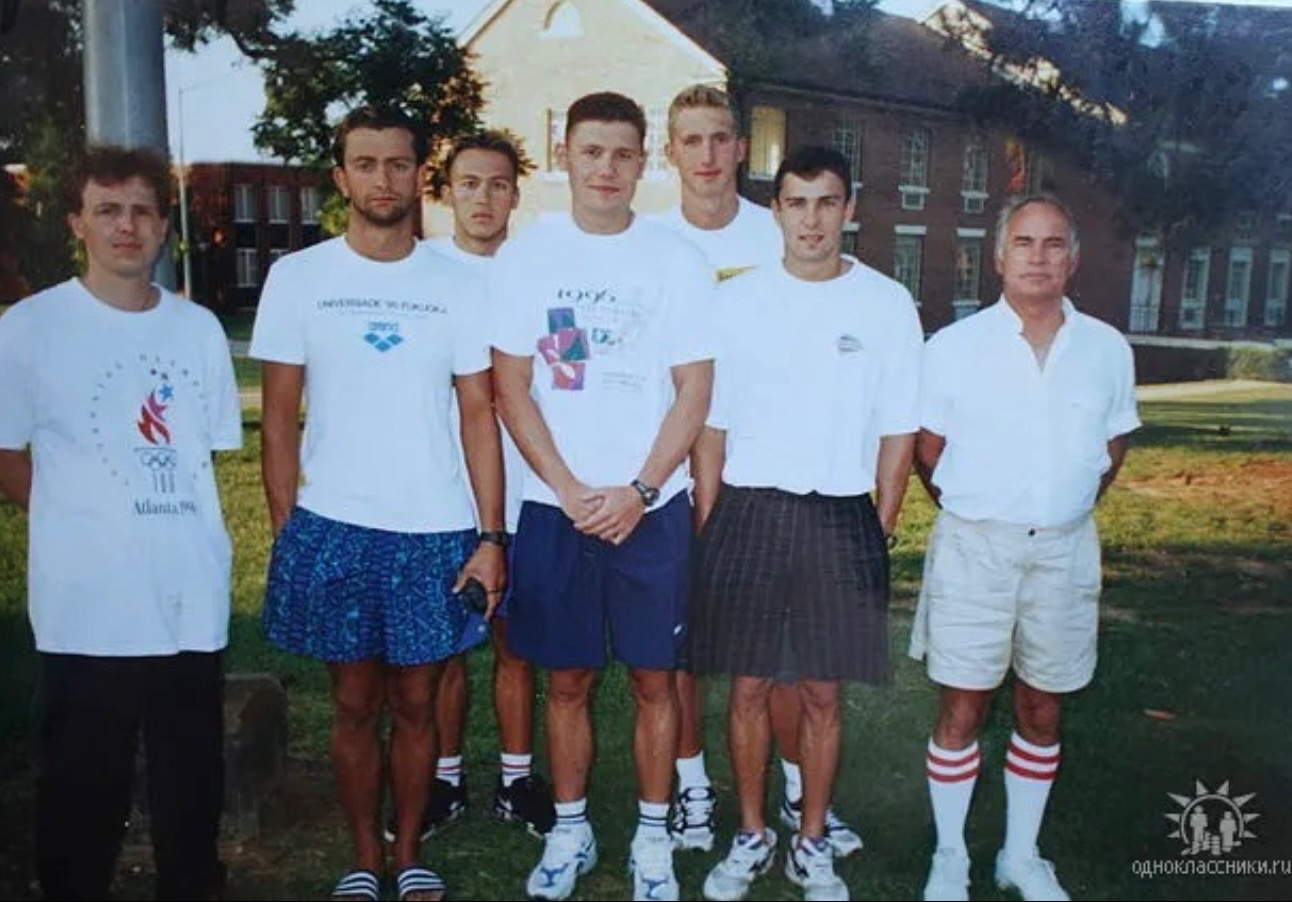
File:Atlanta_1996_Summer_Olympics_Group_Photo.jpgPhoto: Left to Right: Instructor, Konstantin Priahin, Konstantin Andriushin, Vitaly Vasiliev, Sergey Ashihmin, Yevgeny Petrashov, Trainer.

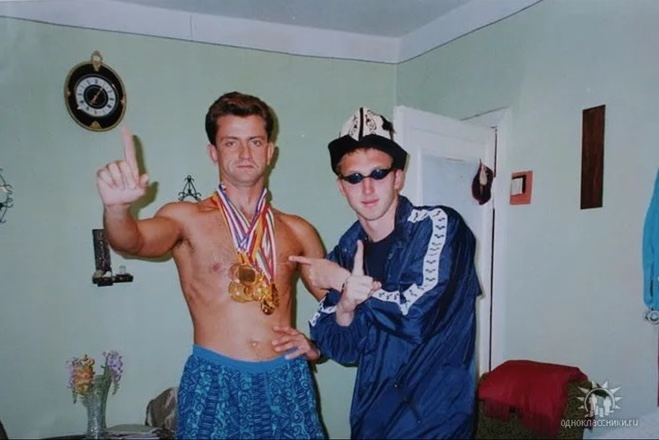
File:Before_Atlanta_1996_Olympic_Games.jpgPhoto: Left to Right: Konstantin Priahin, Sergey Ashihmin.

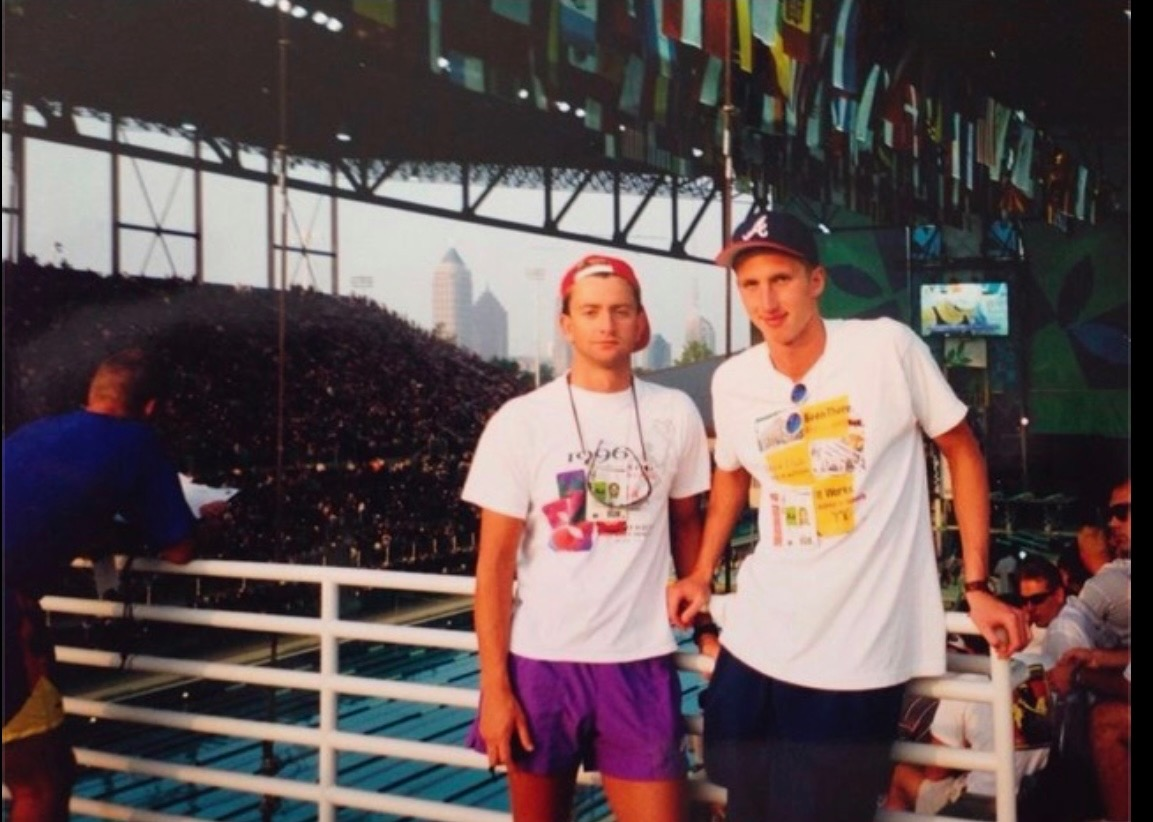
File:Atlanta_1996_Summer_Olympics_Photo.jpgPhoto: Left to Right: Konstantin Priahin, Sergey Ashihmin.

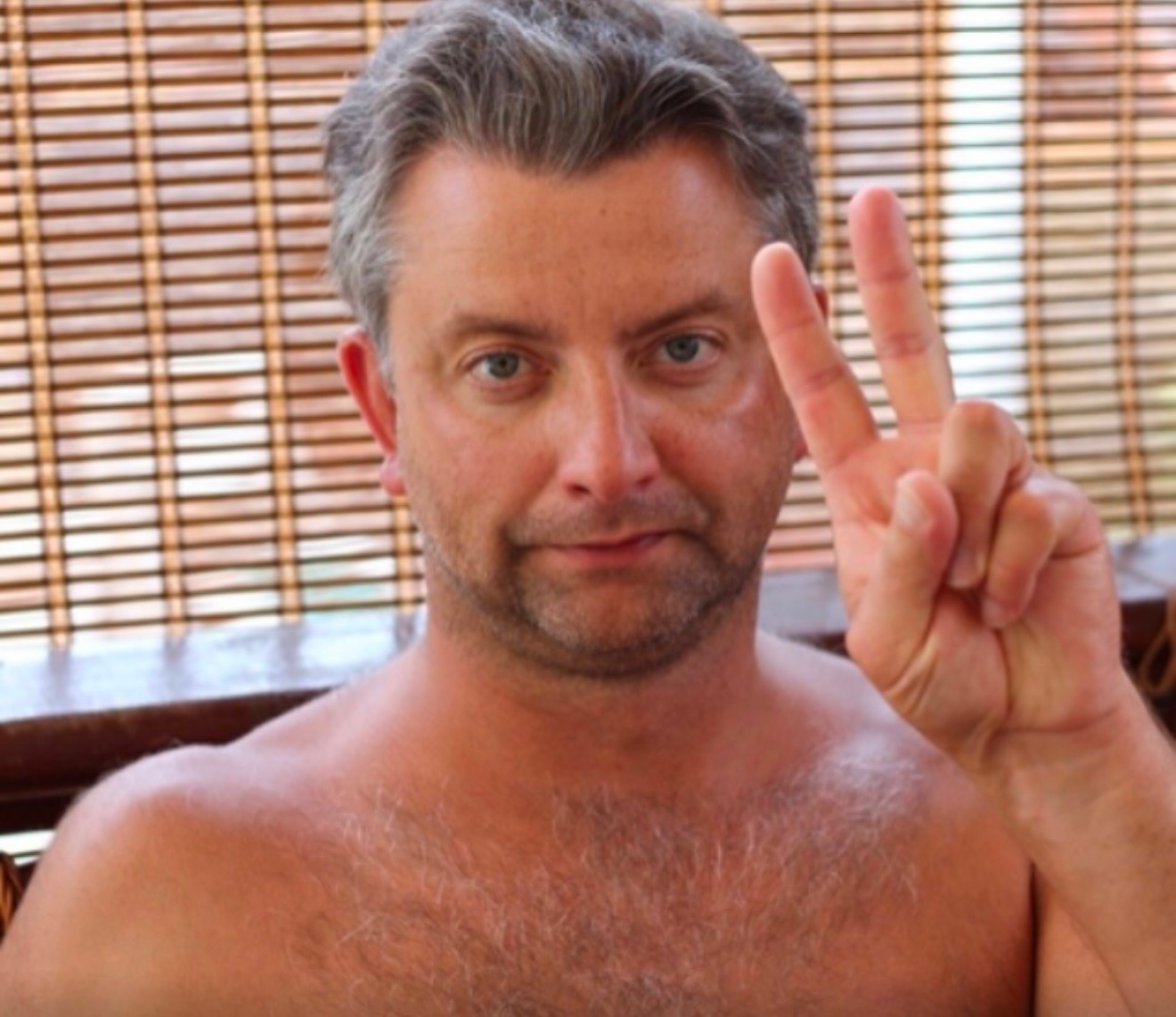
File:Konstantin_Priahin_Portrait.jpgPortrait of Konstain Priahin.
