= Vitaly Vasilyev =

Kyrgyzstani swimmer (born 1973)

Personal information
- Full name: Vitaly Vasilyev
- National team: Kyrgyzstan
- Born: 5 June 1973 (age 53) Frunze, Kirghiz SSR, Soviet Union
- Height: 1.91 m (6 ft 3 in)
- Weight: 83 kg (183 lb)

Sport
- Sport: Swimming
- Strokes: Freestyle

Vitaly Vasilyev (Russian: Виталий Васильев; born 5 June 1973) is a Kyrgyzstani swimmer, who specialized in sprint freestyle events. He is a two-time Olympian (1996 and 2008), and a former Kyrgyzstan record holder in the 50 and 100 m freestyle.

Vasilyev made his first Kyrgyz team at the 1996 Summer Olympics in Atlanta. There, he failed to reach a top 16 final in the 50 m freestyle, finishing in fifty-second place with a time of 24.54. He also placed eighteenth, as a member of the Kyrgyzstan team, in the 4 × 100 m freestyle (3:30.62), and seventeenth in the 4 × 200 m freestyle (8:00.00).

Twelve years after competing in his last Olympics, Vasilyev qualified for his second Kyrgyzstan team, as a 35-year-old, at the 2008 Summer Olympics in Beijing. He cleared a FINA B-standard entry time of 23.11 seconds from the Kazakhstan Open Swimming Championships in Almaty. He challenged seven other swimmers on the seventh heat, including two-time Olympians Jevon Atkinson of Jamaica and Joshua Laban of the Virgin Islands. For the second time, Vasilyev rounded out the field to last place by less than 0.26 of a second behind Laban, lowering his Olympic time to 24.02 seconds. Vasilyev failed to advance into the semifinals, as he placed fifty-fifth out of 92 swimmers in the preliminary heats.
