= Yevgeni Safonov (Uzbekistani footballer) =

Uzbekistani footballer

Personal information
- Full name: Yevgeni Aleksandrovich Safonov
- Date of birth: 6 July 1977 (age 49)
- Place of birth: Toshkent, Uzbek SSR, Soviet Union
- Height: 1.99 m (6 ft 6 in)
- Position: Goalkeeper

Senior career*
Years	Team	Apps	(Gls)
1996–1997	FC Dustlik		
1998–1999	FK Samarqand-Dinamo		
2000–2006	FC Shinnik Yaroslavl	74	(0)
2007	FC Ural Sverdlovsk Oblast	8	(0)
2008	FC Ryazan	19	(0)
2008	FC Megasport	6	(0)

International career^{‡}
1999–2006	Uzbekistan	26	(0)
- * Club domestic league appearances and goals as of 15 August 2008 ‡ National team caps and goals as of 22 June 2008

Yevgeni Aleksandrovich Safonov (Russian: Евгений Александрович Сафонов; born 6 July 1977) is a former Uzbekistani professional football goalkeeper.

He is a member of the national team, and has played 26 matches since his debut in 1999.

Safonov is 1.99 m (6 ft 6 1/2 in) tall and weighs 96 kg (15 st 1 lb). He was born in Tashkent.
