= Basketball at the 1997 West Asian Games =

- Venue: Azadi Basketball Hall
- Date: 21–22 November 1997

Basketball was one of the disciplines which was held at the 1997 West Asian Games in Tehran, Iran. Because of some last minute withdrawals, only two teams were left for the competition, Iran and Turkmenistan. Two other Iranian teams were added to the competition but they didn't receive medals. Only gold and silver medals were awarded. Iran beat Turkmenistan in the final to win the gold medal.

== Results ==
Semifinals
21 November
Iran	85
Iran U18	60
21 November
Turkmenistan	79
(Iran) Fath Tehran	63

Final
22 November
Iran	64
Turkmenistan	56
Third place
22 November
Iran U18	56
(Iran) Fath Tehran	75

=== Semifinals ===
21 November

Iran	85–60	Iran U18

Azadi Basketball Hall, Tehran

21 November

Turkmenistan	79–63	(Iran) Fath Tehran

Azadi Basketball Hall, Tehran

=== Third place ===
22 November

Iran U18	56–75	(Iran) Fath Tehran

Azadi Basketball Hall, Tehran

=== Final ===
22 November

Iran	64–56	Turkmenistan

Azadi Basketball Hall, Tehran
