= Football at the 1997 West Asian Games =

- Venue: Azadi Stadium
- Date: 20–27 November 1997

The football tournament at the 1997 West Asian Games took place from 20 to 27 November 1997.

The host team Iran (represented by under 23 squad) won the gold medal in round robin competition, Syria won the silver and Kuwait finished with the bronze medal.

== Results ==
| Pos | Team | Pld | W | D | L | GF | GA | GD | Pts |
|---|---|---|---|---|---|---|---|---|---|
| 1 | Iran | 4 | 3 | 1 | 0 | 8 | 4 | +4 | 10 |
| 2 | Syria | 4 | 3 | 0 | 1 | 14 | 4 | +10 | 9 |
| 3 | Kuwait | 4 | 2 | 1 | 1 | 8 | 7 | +1 | 7 |
| 4 | Tajikistan | 4 | 0 | 1 | 3 | 1 | 6 | −5 | 1 |
| 5 | Turkmenistan | 4 | 0 | 1 | 3 | 3 | 13 | −10 | 1 |

Source: First West Asian Games
20 November

| Syria | 5–0 | Turkmenistan |

Azadi Stadium, Tehran

20 November

| Tajikistan | 1–3 | Iran |

Azadi Stadium, Tehran

21 November

| Turkmenistan | 2–6 | Kuwait |

Azadi Stadium, Tehran

21 November

| Syria | 2–3 | Iran |

Azadi Stadium, Tehran

23 November

| Turkmenistan | 0–0 | Tajikistan |

Azadi Stadium, Tehran

23 November

| Kuwait | 1–5 | Syria |

Azadi Stadium, Tehran

25 November

| Tajikistan | 0–2 | Syria |

Azadi Stadium, Tehran

25 November

| Iran | 0–0 | Kuwait |

Azadi Stadium, Tehran

27 November

| Kuwait | 1–0 | Tajikistan |

Azadi Stadium, Tehran

27 November

| Iran | 2–1 | Turkmenistan |

Azadi Stadium, Tehran
