= Saeed Beigi =

Iranian football defender

Personal information
- Full name: Saeed Gholam-Ali Beigi
- Date of birth: 1 November 1979 (age 47)
- Place of birth: Iran
- Position: Defender

Youth career
- Esteghlal

Senior career*
Years	Team	Apps	(Gls)
2000–2002	Esteghlal		(1)
2002–	Aboumoslem		
–2008	Saba Battery	67	(2)
2008–2010	Saipa	37	(0)
2010–2011	Esteghlal Ahvaz	1	(0)
2011–2012	Saipa Shomal	17	(0)
2012–2013	Shahrdari Arak	22	(2)
- * Club domestic league appearances and goals as of 6 January 2018

Saeed Beigi (Persian: سعید بیگی, born November 1, 1979, in Iran) is a retired Iranian football defender.
