= Mojahed Khaziravi =

Iranian former football player (born 1980)

Personal information
- Full name: Mojahed Khaziravi
- Date of birth: 21 September 1980 (age 46)
- Place of birth: Shadegan, Iran
- Height: 1.78 m (5 ft 10 in)
- Position: Right winger

Youth career
- 1994–1999: Sanat Naft

Senior career*
Years	Team	Apps	(Gls)
1999–2000	Sanat Naft		
2000–2002	Esteghlal	18	(4)
2004–2005	Esteghlal	5	(0)
2005–2010	Foolad	8	(0)
2010–2013	Esteghlal Ahvaz		(2)
2013–2014	Sanat Naft	4	(0)

International career
2001–2002	Iran	8	(1)
- * Club domestic league appearances and goals

Mojahed Khaziravi (Persian: مجاهد خذیراوی, born 21 September 1980) is an Iranian former football player who played for Esteghlal, Foolad, and Sanat Naft in Iran's football League.

His career took a dramatic turnover in June 2002, when he was arrested by Iranian police for attending a birthday party. At the time, Khaziravi was becoming a significant football icon in Iran after significantly helping the national team in their failed qualification campaign for World Cup 2002.

Like many of Iran's great football talents, Khaziravi is a native of Khuzestan, and like most players from this region of the country, he was known for his speed and dribbling skills. His primary position was wingback, but he could also play as a winger like his fellow Khuzestani Hossein Kaebi. He is right-footed.

== Club career ==
Season	Team	Division	Apps	Goals
2001–02	Esteghlal	1	13	1
2004–05	Esteghlal	1	5	0
2005–06	Foolad	1	0	0
2006–07	Foolad	1	1	0
2007–08	Foolad	2	?	0
2008–09	Foolad	1	5	0
2009–10	Foolad	1	0	0

== Rise and fall ==
Khaziravi started playing for his hometown Abadan's main club, Sanat Naft FC. At 19, he was undeniably the team's star, but the club was relegated from the top division in Iran. That's when he made the switch to national giants Esteghlal for the 2000–2001 season. This year proved to be critical for the young wingback as he helped his team win the last Azadegan championship. His performances during that season attracted Iran's national team manager, Miroslav Blazevic and he eventually got his first international appearance on July 22, 2001, against Bosnia.

The next season saw the league becoming officially professional and was named the Iranian Premier League. Again Khaziravi was instrumental in the Esteghlal's second-place finish to their rivals, Persepolis FC.

But during that same season, the young talent almost reached national stardom. His presences became more and more influential for the national team as Iran was battling for a spot in the World Cup. After losing a critical game against underdogs Bahrain on what became one of Iranian football's darkest days (Khaziravi mysteriously remained on the bench for this game), the team had to go through qualification playoffs. The Iranians first played the UAE with Khaziravi being instrumental in both matches. Their next opponents were the Republic of Ireland. On the first leg in Dublin, Ireland beat Iran 2–0. Iran ended up losing 2–1 on aggregate after winning 1–0 on the return leg.

By spring of 2002, Khaziravi had become an automatic choice for the national team and played friendlies against Venezuela (against whom he scored his only international goal) and Algeria. In addition to his national team success, he was on the shortlists of many European scouts. It had been speculated that Esteghlal agents were negotiating a deal for him with the German club Hansa Rostock.

In June of that year, Khaziravi was caught by the Tehran police in a brothel and was arrested (prostitution is strictly forbidden in Iran). Upon his arrest, he was set to receive a punishment of 99 lashes and was handed a five-year suspension from playing with the Iran national football team, and a three-year suspension from playing with his club, Esteghlal. His suspension was later reduced, and he was not lashed either.

== Signs of a comeback ==
During his suspension term, Khaziravi sought for opportunities to play outside of Iran, notably in Greece, but it never worked out. Things quickly turned in Mojahed's favor as his bans from Iranian football both were reduced to 20 months. In February 2004, Mojahed Khaziravi was once again eligible to play football for both club and country. Reports suggested that he would replace Alireza Nikbakht Vahedi in Esteghlal after the latter had departed to play in the UAE league. Unfortunately, accumulated absence from professional football and injuries had strongly affected the winger's form, and he missed most of the action until he was finally let go by Esteghlal in 2005.

For the 2005–2006 season, Khaziravi returned to professional action in his region of Khuzestan with the champions of the previous season Foolad FC in Ahvaz. Because of the departure of the team's star, Eman Mobali, to the UAE league, the team could not repeat its dominant performance of 2004–2005 and could only manage to finish 8th in the IPL.

He also played in the 2006 Asian Champions League, starting all six matches and scoring one goal, in Foolad's poor overall performance and an early exit in the first round.

For the 2006–2007 season, it was rumored that he would make a comeback to his hometown team Sanat Naft of Abadan in case they were promoted to the IPL. Sanat Naft was not able to gain promotion, and Khaziravi remained in Foolad.
