= Konstantin Andriushin =

Kyrgyz swimmer (born 1975)

Personal information
- Full name: Konstantin Andriushin
- National team: Kyrgyzstan
- Born: 19 May 1976 (age 50) Frunze, Kirghiz SSR, Soviet Union
- Height: 1.79 m (5 ft 10 in)
- Weight: 72 kg (159 lb)

Sport
- Sport: Swimming
- Strokes: Butterfly

Konstantin Andriushin (Russian: Константин Андрюшин; born May 19, 1975) is a Kyrgyz former swimmer, who specialized in butterfly events. He is a two-time Olympian (1996 and 2000), and a member of the Kyrgyzstan swimming team since the breakup of the Soviet Union. In March 2000, Andriushin became one of the 44 candidates to be elected to the IOC Athletes' Commission, but he was shortlisted.

Andriushin made his Olympic debut for Kyrgyzstan at the 1996 Summer Olympics in Atlanta. He failed to reach the top 16 final in the 200 m butterfly, finishing only in twenty-sixth place with a time of 2:01.59. He also placed twenty-first, along with his teammates Konstantin Priahin, Yevgeny Petrashov, and Russian import Sergey Ashihmin, in the 4×100 m medley relay (3:56.24).

At the 2000 Summer Olympics in Sydney, Andriushin swam only in the men's 200 m butterfly. He achieved a FINA B-cut of 2:04.02 from the Russian Open Championships in Saint Petersburg. He challenged seven other swimmers in heat two, including 19-year-olds Zoran Lazarovski of Macedonia and Juan Pablo Valdivieso of Peru. He held off a battle race from Indonesia's Albert Sutanto to save a seventh spot by 0.27 of a second in 2:04.86. Andriushin failed to advance into the semifinals, as he placed forty-first overall in the prelims.
