= Rufat Quliyev (footballer) =

Azerbaijani footballer (born 1972)

Personal information
- Date of birth: 4 December 1972 (age 53)
- Place of birth: Azerbaijan
- Height: 1.73 m (5 ft 8 in)
- Position: Midfielder

Youth career
- Turan Tovuz

Senior career*
Years	Team	Apps	(Gls)
1992–1995	Turan Tovuz		
1995–1997	Khazri Buzovna		
1997–1998	Qarabağ		
1999–2000	Shafa Baku		
2000–2002	Esteghlal	24	(4)
2002–2005	Sanat Naft	29	(1)
2005–2006	Turan Tovuz		

International career
1997–2002	Azerbaijan	27	(0)

Managerial career
- 2012–2019: Ağsu
- 2023–2024: Araz Saatlı
- 2024: Bylis (assistant)
- * Club domestic league appearances and goals

Rufat Quliyev (Azerbaijani: Rüfət Quliyev; born 4 December 1972,) is an Azerbaijani former professional footballer who played as a midfielder for Khazri Buzovna, FK Qarabağ, Shafa Baku, Esteghlal Tehran FC and Sanat Naft Abadan FC.

== Managerial career ==
In September 2024, Quliyev joined the Albanian Superliga club Bylis. He served as the assistant coach for the main team, as well as the head coach of the club's reserve team and U-19 youth team. In October 2024, he announced his departure from Bylis.
