= Ahmad Momenzadeh =

Iranian footballer

Personal information
- Full name: Ahmad Momenzadeh
- Date of birth: 1975 (age 50–51)
- Place of birth: Isfahan, Iran
- Height: 1.78 m (5 ft 10 in)
- Position: Striker

Senior career*
Years	Team	Apps	(Gls)
1995–1996	Sepahan		
1996–1997	Payam	15	(3)
1997–2000	Sepahan	48	(18)
2000–2003	Esteghlal	53	(10)
2003–2005	Foolad	32	(14)
2005–2007	Saipa	26	(5)
2007–2008	Foolad	18	(3)
2008–2010	Rah Ahan	12	(2)
2010–2011	Aluminium	8	(1)
2013–2014	Parseh	13	(4)
2019–	Van Pars Naghshe Jahan		

International career^{‡}
- Iran
- * Club domestic league appearances and goals as of 11 April 2013 ‡ National team caps and goals as of 28 September 2007

Ahmad Momenzadeh (Persian: احمد مومن‌زاده, born 1975 in Isfahan, Iran) is an Iranian football player who mostly played at the highest level of the Iranian Football Leagues. He last time played for Van Pars Naghe Jahan Isfahan.

He previously played for Esteghlal F.C. which became Azadegan League Champions in the 2000–01 season. and Saipa F.C. which became IPL Champions in the 2006–07 season.

In early 2013 after 2 years absence from football he joined Azadegan League side Parseh alongside his former teammate at Esteghlal Parviz Boroumand.

== Club career statistics ==
As of 10 Feb 2014

Club performance			League		Cup		Continental		Total	
Season	Club	League	Apps	Goals	Apps	Goals	Apps	Goals	Apps	Goals
Iran			League		Hazfi Cup		Asia		Total	
2001–02	Esteghlal	Pro League	16	3		4				
2002–03	Esteghlal	Pro League		2						
2003–04	Foolad	Pro League		7			–	–		
2004–05	Foolad	Pro League	28	7			–	–		
2005–06	Saipa	Pro League	3	1			–	–		
2006–07	Saipa	Pro League	23	4			–	–		
2007–08	Foolad	Division 1		3			–	–		
2008–09	Rah Ahan	Pro League	4	1	5	1	–	–	9	2
2009–10	Rah Ahan	Pro League	8	1	0	0	–	–	8	1
2010–11	Aluminium	Division 1	8	1	1	0	–	–	9	1
2012–13	Parseh	Division 1	4	4	–	–	–	–	4	4
2013–14	Parseh	Division 1	9	0		0	–	–	9	0
Total	Iran			39						
Career total				39						

- Assist Goals

Season	Team	Assists
05–06	Saipa	1
06–07	Saipa	2
09–10	Rah Ahan	0

== Honours ==
=== Club ===
- Iranian League
  - Winner: 3
    - 2000/01 with Esteghlal
    - 2004/05 with Foolad
    - 2006/07 with Saipa
- Hazfi Cup
  - Winner: 1
    - 2001/02 with Esteghlal
