= Mehdi Hasheminasab =

Iranian footballer

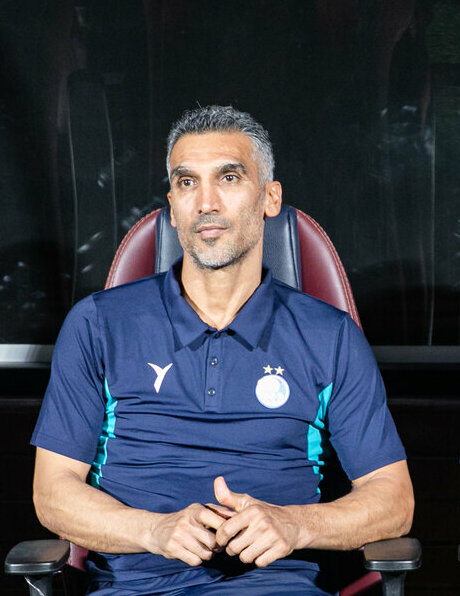
- Hasheminasab in 2023

Personal information
- Full name: Seyyed Mehdi Hasheminasab
- Date of birth: January 27, 1974 (age 52)
- Place of birth: Abadan, Iran
- Height: 1.85 m (6 ft 1 in)
- Position: Defender

Senior career*
Years	Team	Apps	(Gls)
1994–1996	Pars Khodro		
1996–1997	Köpetdag		
1997–2000	Persepolis		
2000–2003	Esteghlal	54	(11)
2003–2004	Pas	11	(1)
2004–2005	Saipa	28	(2)
2005–2006	Oghab		
2006–2008	Aboomoslem	55	(3)
2008–2009	Payam	14	(2)
2011	Siah Jamegan	10	(1)
2012	Aboomoslem	6	(0)

International career^{‡}
1999–2001	Iran	28	(3)

Managerial career
- 2009: Payam (assistant)
- 2010: Esteghlal Ahvaz (assistant)
- 2016–2017: Siah Jamegan (assistant)
- 2017–2018: Khooneh be Khooneh (assistant)
- 2018: Nassaji Mazandaran (assistant)
- 2019–2021: Foolad (assistant)
- 2022–2023: Foolad (assistant)
- 2023–2024: Esteghlal (assistant)
- * Club domestic league appearances and goals as of 18 February 2009 ‡ National team caps and goals as of 19 December 2006

Seyyed Mehdi Hasheminasab (Persian: سید مهدی هاشمی‌نسب; born January 27, 1974) is a retired Iranian footballer.

== Club career ==
He served his golden days in Persepolis and Esteghlal.

=== Club career statistics ===
Club performance			League		Cup		Continental		Total	
Season	Club	League	Apps	Goals	Apps	Goals	Apps	Goals	Apps	Goals
Iran			League		Hazfi Cup		Asia		Total	
1997–98	Persepolis	Azadegan League								
1998–99	Persepolis	Azadegan League					—			
1999–00	Persepolis	Azadegan League		10						
2000–01	Esteghlal	Azadegan League	18	6						
2001–02	Esteghlal	Iran Pro League	18	0						
2002–03	Esteghlal	Iran Pro League	18	5				0		
2003–04	Pas	Iran Pro League	11	1			—			
2004–05	Saipa	Iran Pro League	28	2			—			
2005–06	Oghab	Division 1					—			
2006–07	Aboumoslem	Iran Pro League	25	1			—			
2007–08	Aboumoslem	Iran Pro League	30	2			—			
2008–09	Payam Mashhad	Iran Pro League	14	2			—			
Career total										

== International career ==
After a number of very good seasons with Persepolis, Hasheminasab was called up to the national team, earning his first cap versus Kuwait on February 15, 1999. He was also a member of the national team during the World Cup 2002 qualification campaign. Some consider him and a number of other players to be responsible for the poor atmosphere in the national team camp, and its eventual failure to qualify. In his career he achieved 28 caps and 2 goals.

== Personal life ==
On 29 December 2025, Hasheminasab publicly supported the 2025–2026 Iranian protests on his Instagram, stating: "This life full of pain, anger, and uncertainty is not the right of our people. Protesting is our right."
