= Hadi Tabatabaei =

Iranian footballer

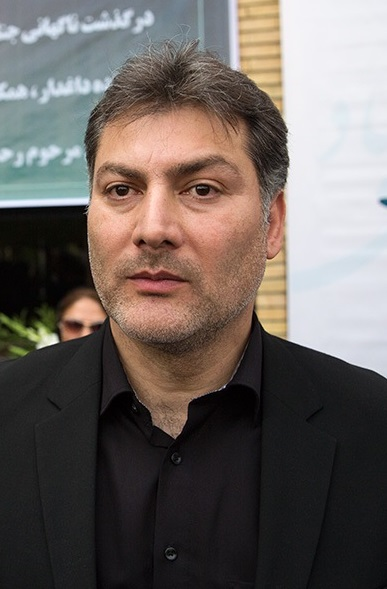

Personal information
- Full name: Sayed Hadi Tabatabaei
- Date of birth: April 9, 1973 (age 53)
- Place of birth: Rasht, Iran
- Height: 1.83 m (6 ft 0 in)
- Position: Goalkeeper

Youth career
- Esteghlal Rasht

Senior career*
Years	Team	Apps	(Gls)
1989–1993	Esteghlal Rasht		
1993–1994	Keshavarz		
1994–1996	Pas		
1996–1999	Bahman		
1999	→ Fajr Sepasi (loan)		
1999–2003	Esteghlal		
2004–2005	Saba Battery	15	(0)
2005–2006	Shahid Ghandi	11	(0)

International career
1997–2000	Iran	14	(0)

Managerial career
- 2008–2011: Iran U23 (goalkeeping coach)
- 2014–2016: Iran U23 (assistant coach)
- 2016–2017: Damash Gilan
- * Club domestic league appearances and goals

Hadi Tabatabaei (Persian: هادى طباطبايی, born on April 13, 1973, in Rasht) is a retired Iranian football goalkeeper.

Following Tabatabaei's retirement in 2006 he became a fully qualified coach and holds an Asian Football Confederation 'A' level coaching licence.

== International career ==
Tabatabaei debuted for Iran versus the Maldives on June 11, 1997,

Tabatabaei was a member for Iran national football team between 1997 and 2000, but after the injury right before the Asian Cup 2000 he was never called up for national team again. His most memorable games for the national team was a friendly match versus Denmark on October 10, 1999, in Copenhagen. Following that performance Iranian newspapers dubbed him the Lion of Copenhagen.
