= Faraz Fatemi =

Iranian footballer

Personal information
- Full name: Faraz Fatemi
- Date of birth: October 4, 1977 (age 49)
- Place of birth: Shiraz, Iran
- Height: 1.90 m (6 ft 3 in)
- Position: Center forward

Senior career*
Years	Team	Apps	(Gls)
1997–1999	Fajr Sepasi	48	(13)
1999–2000	Egaleo	11	(2)
2000–2001	Fajr Sepasi	17	(7)
2001–2004	Esteghlal	58	(11)
2004–2006	Zob Ahan	45	(7)
2006–2008	Persepolis	31	(4)
2008–2011	Mes	78	(17)
2011–2012	Mashin Sazi	6	(3)
Total		291	(64)

International career^{‡}
2001–2002	Iran	11	(1)

Managerial career
- 2015–2016: Parseh
- * Club domestic league appearances and goals as of December 4, 2011 ‡ National team caps and goals as of January 9, 2008

Faraz Fatemi (Persian: فراز فاطمی, born October 4, 1977) is an Iranian retired footballer.

== Club career ==
He has played for a few clubs in Iran, including Fajr Sepasi, Esteghlal and Zob Ahan, as well as Egaleo F.C. in the Greek Beta Ethniki. In July 2006, he joined another IPL club, Persepolis.

After his retirement, he coached Parseh, resigning in March 2016.

=== Club career statistics ===
As of 21 May 2011

Club performance			League		Cup		Continental		Total	
Season	Club	League	Apps	Goals	Apps	Goals	Apps	Goals	Apps	Goals
Iran			League		Hazfi Cup		Asia		Total	
1997–98	Fajr	Azadegan League	23	6	0	0	-	-	23	6
1998–99	Fajr	Azadegan League	25	7	0	0	-	-	25	7
Greece			League		Greek Cup		Europe		Total	
1999–00	Egaleo	Beta Ethniki	11	2	0	0	-	-	11	2
Iran			League		Hazfi Cup		Asia		Total	
2000–01	Fajr	Azadegan League	17	7	0	0	-	-	17	7
2001–02	Esteghlal	Pro League	24	7	1	0	7	4	32	11
2002–03	Esteghlal	Pro League	18	2	2	0	2	0	22	2
2003–04	Esteghlal	Pro League	16	2	0	0	-	-	16	2
2004–05	Zob Ahan	Pro League	26	6	0	0	-	-	26	6
2005–06	Zob Ahan	Pro League	19	1	0	0	-	-	19	1
2006–07	Persepolis	Pro League	13	3	1	0	-	-	14	3
2007–08	Persepolis	Pro League	18	1	3	1	-	-	21	2
2008–09	Mes	Pro League	28	11	1	0	-	-	29	11
2009–10	Mes	Pro League	22	4	3	0	2	0	27	4
2010–11	Mes	Pro League	28	2	1	0	-	-	29	2
Total	Greece		11	2	0	0	-	-	11	2
Total	Iran		277	59	12	1	11	4	300	64
Career total			288	61	12	1	11	4	311	66

- Assist Goals

Season	Team	Assists
05/06	Zob Ahan	1
08/09	Mes Kerman	1
09/10	Mes Kerman	2
10/11	Mes Kerman	1

== International career ==
Fatemi had a short callup to the Iranian national team during the qualification campaign for the 2002 FIFA World Cup.

=== International goals ===
#	Date	Venue	Opponent	Score	Result	Competition
1.	22 July 2001	Stadion pod Borićima, Bihać, Bosnia and Herzegovina	Bosnia and Herzegovina	2–2	D	Friendly
Correct as of 24 July 2021

== Honours ==
Esteghlal

- Hazfi Cup (1): 2001–02

Persepolis

- Iran's Premier Football League (1): 2007-08
