= Syria at the 2002 West Asian Games =

- IOC code: SYR
- NOC: Syrian Olympic Committee

in Kuwait City
- Medals Ranked 4th: Gold 8 Silver 11 Bronze 19 Total 38

West Asian Games appearances
- 1997; 2002; 2005

Syria participated in the 2002 West Asian Games held in Kuwait, Kuwait from April 3 to April 12, 2002.
