= Kuwait at the 2002 West Asian Games =

- IOC code: KUW
- NOC: Kuwait Olympic Committee

in Kuwait City
- Medals Ranked 1st: Gold 31 Silver 22 Bronze 18 Total 71

West Asian Games appearances
- 1997; 2002; 2005

Kuwait hosted and competed in the 2nd West Asian Games held in Kuwait City from April 3, 2002 to April 12, 2002. Kuwait ranked 1st with 31 gold medals in this edition of the West Asian Games.
