= 2002 West Asian Games =

2nd West Asian Games
- Host city: Kuwait City, Kuwait
- Nations: 12
- Events: 69
- Opening: 3 April 2002
- Closing: 12 April 2002
- Opened by: Jaber Al-Ahmad Al-Jaber Al-Sabah

The 2002 West Asian Games was the second edition of the multi-sport event for countries in West Asia and was held in Kuwait City from 3 to 12 April 2002.

The competition was initially expected to be organised in Qatar in 1999, but due to unforeseen circumstances, the Games were not held. The Games were then expected to be held in Lebanon in 2001, but were then cancelled and relocated to Kuwait. The 2nd West Asian Games were expected to be held from 20 to 30 October 2001, but due to armed conflicts in the region, they had to be postponed. Finally, the 2nd West Asian Games were held the following year in Kuwait City.

Athletes from twelve nations participated in ten sports. Iraq did not participate and no competitions were held for women.

== Sports ==
- Athletics (17)
- Basketball (1)
- Diving (3)
- Fencing (6)
- Football (1)
- Gymnastics (8)
- Handball (1)
- Karate (11)
- Squash (2)
- Swimming (16)

== Participating nations ==
- Bahrain
- Iran
- Jordan
- Kuwait (host)
- Lebanon
- Oman
- Palestine
- Qatar
- Saudi Arabia
- Syria
- United Arab Emirates
- Yemen

== Medal table ==
* Host nation (Kuwait)

| Rank | Nation | Gold | Silver | Bronze | Total |
|---|---|---|---|---|---|
| 1 | Kuwait (KUW)* | 31 | 22 | 18 | 71 |
| 2 | Saudi Arabia (KSA) | 11 | 7 | 8 | 26 |
| 3 | Iran (IRI) | 9 | 11 | 16 | 36 |
| 4 | Syria (SYR) | 8 | 11 | 19 | 38 |
| 5 | Qatar (QAT) | 8 | 9 | 8 | 25 |
| 6 | Jordan (JOR) | 2 | 1 | 6 | 9 |
| 7 | Lebanon (LIB) | 1 | 1 | 1 | 3 |
| 8 | United Arab Emirates (UAE) | 0 | 1 | 4 | 5 |
| 9 | Yemen (YEM) | 0 | 0 | 3 | 3 |
| 10 | Bahrain (BRN) | 0 | 0 | 2 | 2 |
| 11 | Oman (OMA) | 0 | 0 | 1 | 1 |
| Totals (11 entries) | | 70 | 63 | 86 | 219 |
