= 1997 West Asian Games =

Multi-sport event held in Tehran

1st West Asian Games
- Host city: Tehran, Iran
- Nations: 10
- Athletes: 850
- Events: 134 in 15 Sports
- Opening: 19 November
- Closing: 28 November
- Opened by: President Mohammad Khatami
- Torch lighter: Teymour Ghiasi
- Main venue: Azadi Stadium
- Website: WestAsianGames.com

The 1st West Asian Games was held from 19 to 28 November 1997 in Tehran, Iran and had around 850 athletes and 236 team officials participating from 10 countries in 15 sports. Initially only men were allowed to participate.

The nations that participated were: Iran, Jordan, Kuwait, Kyrgyzstan, Lebanon, Qatar, Syria, Tajikistan, Turkmenistan and Yemen.

The official sports programme contained athletics, aquatics, badminton, basketball, boxing, fencing, football, judo, karate, shooting, table tennis, taekwondo, tennis, weightlifting, and wrestling.

== Venues ==
Tehran َAzadi Complex

- Azadi Stadium
- Azadi Velodrome
- Azadi Indoor Stadium
- Azadi Swimming Pool Hall
- Azadi Five Halls Complex
- Heidarnia Hall
  - Azadi Basketball Hall
  - Azadi Weightlifting Hall
  - Azadi Volleyball Hall
  - Azadi Wrestling Hall
  - Azadi Women's Hall
- Azadi Shooting Complex
- Azadi Artificial Lake
- Azadi Driving Court
- Azadi Tennis Courts
- Olympic Hotel, Tehran
- Azadi Equestrian Court
- Azadi Karting Court
- Azadi Baseball Court
- Azadi Football Training Pitches
- 13th Rajab Sport Hall

== Sports ==
- Athletics (22)
- Badminton (3)
- Basketball (1)
- Boxing (12)
- Fencing (6)
- Football (1)
- Judo (8)
- Karate (11)
- Shooting (14)
- Swimming (16)
- Table tennis (3)
- Taekwondo (8)
- Tennis (3)
- Weightlifting (10)
- Wrestling (16)

== Participating nations ==
- Iran (host)
- Jordan
- Kuwait
- Kyrgyzstan
- Lebanon
- Qatar
- Syria
- Tajikistan
- Turkmenistan
- Yemen
- Palestine Did not participate
- United Arab Emirates Did not participate
- Saudi Arabia Did not participate
- Oman Did not participate
- Bahrain Did not participate

== Medal table ==
* Host nation (Iran)

Rank	Nation	Gold	Silver	Bronze	Total
1	Iran (IRI)*	63	37	56	156
2	Kyrgyzstan (KGZ)	26	15	16	57
3	Syria (SYR)	16	22	13	51
4	Kuwait (KUW)	15	22	20	57
5	Turkmenistan (TKM)	5	13	30	48
6	Tajikistan (TJK)	3	11	19	33
7	Lebanon (LIB)	2	4	6	12
8	Jordan (JOR)	2	4	4	10
9	Qatar (QAT)	1	5	6	12
10	Yemen (YEM)	1	0	0	1
Totals (10 entries)		134	133	170	437
