= List of Persepolis F.C. players =

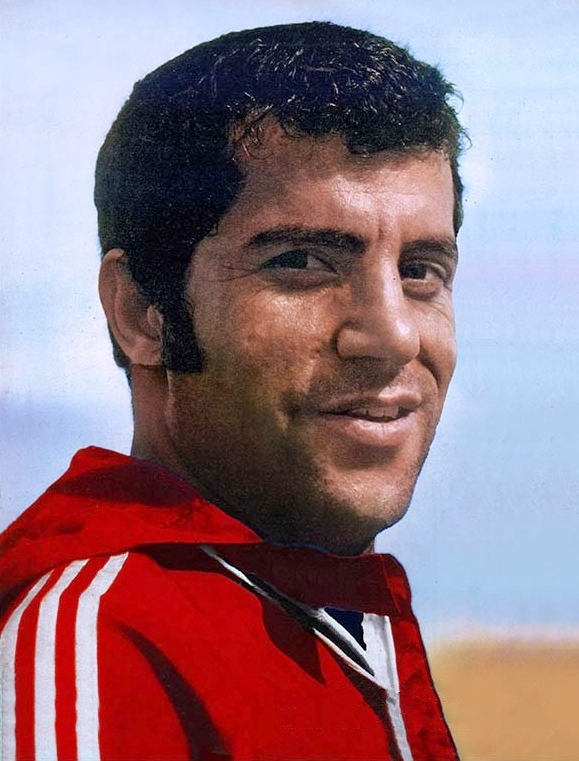
Ali Parvin, pictured here, holds the records for most appearances with the club, with 341.

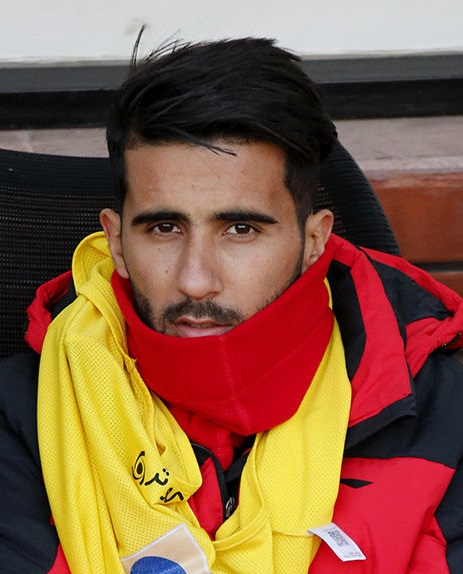
Bashar Resan is the most capped foreigner in Persepolis history.

Persepolis Football Club is a professional association football club based in Tehran, Iran.

Persepolis was founded in 1963 by Ali Abdo and has been in the first division of Iranian football since 1968. The club has played at its home ground, Azadi Stadium, since 1973. They contest the Tehran Derby against rival team Esteghlal, a match that is closely followed by Iranian football fans and considered to be one of the popular clubs in Asia,. According to the Asian Football Confederation, Persepolis is the most popular football club in Asia. At the AFC Champions League, 11 of the top 20 matches by attendance were played by Persepolis. Persepolis has also broken the record of 100,000 attendees in four matches at the AFC Champions League. Persepolis has won a record sixteen Iranian league titles, as well as seven Hazfi Cups, five Super Cups and the 1990–91 Asian Cup Winners' Cup. Many notable players have played for the club, including former Bundesliga players Ali Karimi, Ali Daei, Vahid Hashemian and Mehdi Mahdavikia. Ali Parvin, who spent 18 years with the club from 1970 to 1988, is widely regarded as the club's greatest player.

The list includes notable footballers who have played for Persepolis. Generally, this means players that have played at least 100 league matches for the club.

== Key ==
- The list is ordered first by date of debut, and then if necessary in alphabetical order.
- Appearances as a substitute are also included.
- Statistics are correct up to and including the match played on 27 February 2024. Where a player left the club permanently after this date, his statistics are updated to his date of leaving.

Positions key
GK	Goalkeeper		
FB	Full-back	DF	Defender
HB	Half-back	MF	Midfielder
FW	Forward		

Nationality
Unless otherwise noted, the nationality of a player is determined by the country/countries which he has played for, or if said person has not played international football, their country of birth.
Position
Playing positions are listed according to the tactical formations that were employed at the time.
Club career
Club career is defined as the first and last calendar years in which the player appeared for the club in any of the competitions listed below.
Total appearances and Total goals
Total appearances and goals comprise those in the Iran Local League, Takht Jamshid Cup, Qods League, Azadegan League, Iran Pro League, Tehran Football League, Hazfi Cup, Tehran Hazfi Cup, AFC Champions League, Asian Cup Winners' Cup, and Iranian Super Cup.

== World Cup Players ==
(Argentina) 1978 FIFA World Cup

- (Iran) Ali Parvin
- (Iran) Mohammad Sadeghi
- (Iran) Javad Allahverdi

(France) 1998 FIFA World Cup

- (Iran) Ahmad Reza Abedzadeh
- (Iran) Mehdi Mahdavikia
- (Iran) Naeem Saadavi
- (Iran) Afshin Peyrovani
- (Iran) Nima Nakisa
- (Iran) Reza Shahroudi
- (Iran) Mehrdad Minavand

(Germany) 2006 FIFA World Cup

- (Iran) Javad Kazemian
- (Iran) Mehrzad Madanchi

(Brazil) 2014 FIFA World Cup

- (Iran) Jalal Hosseini
- (Iran) Hossein Mahini
- (Iran) Mehrdad Pooladi
- (Iran) Reza Haghighi

(Russia) 2018 FIFA World Cup

- (Iran) Alireza Beiranvand
- (Iran) Vahid Amiri

(Qatar) 2022 FIFA World Cup

- (Iran) Alireza Beiranvand
- (Iran) Morteza Pouraliganji
- (Iran) Vahid Amiri
- (Iran) Mehdi Torabi

(Canada) (Mexico) (United States) 2026 FIFA World Cup

- (Iran) Payam Niazmand
- (Iran) Hossein Kanaanizadegan
- (Iran) Milad Mohammadi
- (Iran) Ali Alipour
- (Uzbekistan) Oston Urunov
- (Uzbekistan) Igor Sergeev

== Olympic Players ==
(West Germany) 1972 Olympics

- (Iran) Ali Parvin
- (Iran) Ebrahim Ashtiani
- (Iran) Jafar Kashani
- (Iran) Safar Iranpak
- (Iran) Mahmoud Khordbin

(Canada) 1976 Olympics

- (Iran) Parviz Ghelichkhani
- (Iran) Ali Parvin
- (Iran) Bijan Zolfagharnassab
- (Iran) Alireza Azizi

== UEFA Euro Cup Players ==
(Germany) UEFA Euro 2024

- (Georgia (country)) Giorgi Gvelesiani

== AFC Asian Cup Players ==
(Iran) 1968 AFC Asian Cup

- (Iran) Aziz Asli
- (Iran) Jafar Kashani
- (Iran) Hossein Kalani
- (Iran) Homayoun Behzadi

(Thailand) 1972 AFC Asian Cup

- (Iran) Jafar Kashani
- (Iran) Ebrahim Ashtiani
- (Iran) Ali Parvin
- (Iran) Homayoun Behzadi
- (Iran) Hossein Kalani
- (Iran) Safar Iranpak

(Iran) 1976 AFC Asian Cup

- (Iran) Bijan Zolfagharnasab
- (Iran) Ali Parvin
- (Iran) Alireza Azizi

(Kuwait) 1980 AFC Asian Cup

- (Iran) Mohammad Panjali
- (Iran) Hamid Derakhshan

(Singapore) 1984 AFC Asian Cup

- (Iran) Behrouz Soltani
- (Iran) Mohammad Panjali
- (Iran) Zia Arabshahi
- (Iran) Nasser Mohammadkhani
- (Iran) Hamid Derakhshan
- (Iran) Gholamreza Fathabadi

(Qatar) 1988 AFC Asian Cup

- (Iran) Morteza Fonounizadeh
- (Iran) Karim Bavi
- (Iran) Morteza Kermani Moghaddam
- (Iran) Mojtaba Moharrami
- (Iran) Mohammad Hassan Ansarifard
- (Iran) Zia Arabshahi

(Japan) 1992 AFC Asian Cup

- (Iran) Mojtaba Moharrami
- (Iran) Hamid Estili
- (Iran) Mohsen Ashouri
- (Iran) Morteza Kermani Moghaddam
- (Iran) Farshad Pious

(United Arab Emirates) 1996 AFC Asian Cup

- (Iran) Ahmad Reza Abedzadeh
- (Iran) Naeem Saadavi
- (Iran) Karim Bagheri
- (Iran) Afshin Peyrovani
- (Iran) Mojtaba Moharrami
- (Iran) Mehdi Mahdavikia
- (Iran) Nima Nakisa
- (Iran) Mehrdad Minavand

(Lebanon) 2000 AFC Asian Cup

- (Iran) Hamed Kavianpour
- (Iran) Hamid Estili
- (Iran) Esmail Halali
- (Iran) Alireza Emamifar
- (Iran) Ali Karimi
- (Iran) Behrouz Rahbarifar
- (Iran) Davoud Fanaei

(China) 2004 AFC Asian Cup

- (Iran) Yahya Golmohammadi
- (Iran) Hamed Kavianpour
- (Iran) Ali Daei

(Thailand) (Vietnam) (Malaysia) (Indonesia) 2007 AFC Asian Cup

- (Iran) Mehrzad Madanchi
- (Iran) Hossein Kaebi
- (Iraq) Luay Salah

(Qatar) 2011 AFC Asian Cup

- (Iran) Gholamreza Rezaei
- (Iran) Mohammad Nouri

(Australia) 2015 AFC Asian Cup

- (Iran) Mohammad Reza Khanzadeh

(United Arab Emirates) 2019 AFC Asian Cup

- (Iran) Alireza Beiranvand
- (Iran) Ahmad Nourollahi
- (Iran) Mehdi Torabi
- (Iraq) Bashar Resan

(Qatar) 2023 AFC Asian Cup

- (Iran) Alireza Beiranvand
- (Iran) Hossein Kanaanizadegan
- (Iran) Mehdi Torabi
- (Tajikistan) Vahdat Hanonov

== CONCACAF Gold Cup Players ==
(Canada) (United States) 2015 CONCACAF Gold Cup

- (Costa Rica) Michael Umaña

== Africa Cup of Nations Players ==
(Equatorial Guinea) (Gabon) 2012 Africa Cup of Nations

- (Burkina Faso) Mamadou Tall

== List of players ==
Notable players with at least 3 seasons (6 half-seasons) and players who have played at least 100 appearances in the club are listed according to the date of their first-team official debut for the club.

Nat	Name	Position	Persepolis career
(Iran)	Hamid Jasemian	Defender	1968–69, 1970–72
(Iran)	Aziz Asli	Goalkeeper	1968–71
(Iran)	Hadi Tavoosi	Goalkeeper	1968–69, 1970–74
(Iran)	Hamid Shirzadegan	Forward	1968–74
(Iran)	Ebrahim Ashtiani	Defender	1968–69, 1970–76
(Iran)	Büyük Vatankhah	Defender	1968–69, 1970–74
(Iran)	Nazem Ganjapour	Forward	1968–69, 1970–72
(Iran)	Jafar Kashani	Defender	1968–69, 1970–75
(Iran)	Hossein Kalani	Forward	1968–69, 1970–75
(Iran)	Fereydoun Moeini	Midfielder	1968–69, 1970–76
(Iran)	Asghar Adibi	Midfielder	1968–80
(Iran)	Reza Vatankhah	Defender	1968–69, 1970–80
(Iran)	Mahmoud Khordbin	Forward	1969–80
(Iran)	Homayoun Behzadi	Forward	1968–69, 1970–75
(Iran)	Mehrab Shahrokhi	Defender	1970–75
(Iran)	Ali Parvin	Midfielder	1970–88
(Iran)	Safar Iranpak	Forward	1970–80
(Iran)	Esmaeil Haj Rahimipour	Midfielder	1970–78
(Iran)	Iraj Soleimani	Forward	1971–75
(Iran)	Mohammad Reza Khalatbari	Midfielder	1971–78
(Iran)	Bahram Mavaddat	Goalkeeper	1973–76
(Iran)	Mohammad Dastjerdi	Midfielder	1973–78
(Iran)	Javad Allahverdi	Defender	1974–81
(Iran)	Yaghoub Fatemi Moghaddam	Defender	1974–79
(Iran)	Alireza Azizi	Midfielder	1975–79
(Iran)	Bijan Zolfagharnasab	Defender	1975–79
(Iran)	Mohammad Dadkan	Defender	1975–83
(Iran)	Mohammad Reza Zadmehr	Forward	1975–90
(Iran)	Mohammad Mayeli Kohan	Midfielder	1976–90
(Iran)	Vazgen Safarian	Goalkeeper	1977–81
(Iran)	Mohammad Panjali	Defender	1977–87, 1989–94
(Iran)	Hamid Derakhshan	Midfielder	1977–87, 1992–94
(Iran)	Majid Sabzi	Midfielder	1979–85
(Iran)	Abbas Kargar	Midfielder	1979–88
(Iran)	Kazem Seyedalikhani	Defender	1979–89
(Iran)	Zia Arabshahi	Midfielder	1979–90
(Iran)	Vahid Ghelich	Goalkeeper	1980–92
(Iran)	Nasser Nouraei	Forward	1981–84
(Iran)	Nasser Mohammadkhani	Forward	1981–86, 1989–94
(Iran)	Behrouz Soltani	Goalkeeper	1981–89
(Iran)	Gholamreza Fathabadi	Forward	1981–86
(Iran)	Fariborz Moradi	Defender	1981–92
(Iran)	Morteza Fonounizadeh	Defender	1985–92
(Iran)	Farshad Pious	Forward	1985–88, 1989–97
(Iran)	Reza Abedian	Forward	1985–90
(Iran)	Rahim Yousefi	Midfielder	1986–92
(Iran)	Saeid Naeimabadi	Defender	1987–93
(Iran)	Mohammad Hassan Ansarifard	Midfielder	1987–92
(Iran)	Nader Mohammadkhani	Defender	1987–88, 1990–91, 1998–2000
(Iran)	Karim Bavi	Forward	1987–91, 1992–93
(Iran)	Mohsen Ashouri	Midfielder	1987–92, 1993–97
(Iran)	Morteza Kermani Moghaddam	Midfielder	1987–89, 1991, 1995–96
(Iran)	Hossein Abdi	Midfielder	1987–2000
(Iran)	Jamshid Shahmohammadi	Forward	1987–88, 1993–95
(Iran)	Mojtaba Moharrami	Defender	1988–97
(Iran)	Hassan Shirmohammadi	Midfielder	1989–92, 1994–95
(Iran)	Mohammad Khakpour	Defender	1990–95
(Iran)	Hamid Estili	Midfielder	1992–94, 1998–2004
(Iran)	Behzad Dadashzadeh	Midfielder	1992–96
(Iran)	Reza Shahroudi	Defender	1992–97, 1998–99, 2000–03
(Iran)	Afshin Peyrovani	Defender	1993–96, 1997–2004
(Iran)	Ahmad Reza Abedzadeh	Goalkeeper	1994–2001
(Iran)	Majid Namjoo-Motlagh	Midfielder	1994–97
(Iran)	Ali Daei	Forward	1994–96, 2003–04
(Iran)	Behrouz Rahbarifar	Defender	1994–2003, 2004–06
(Iran)	Alireza Emamifar	Midfielder	1994–2000, 2003–05
(Iran)	Nima Nakisa	Goalkeeper	1994–96, 1997–99
(Iran)	Reza Torabian	Midfielder	1995–97, 1998–99
(Iran)	Naeim Saadavi	Defender	1995–99
(Iran)	Yahya Golmohammadi	Defender	1995–99, 2002–05
(Iran)	Esmaeil Halali	Midfielder	1995–2002
(Iran)	Mehrdad Minavand	Midfielder	1995–98, 2002–04
(Iran)	Mehdi Mahdavikia	Midfielder	1995–99, 2012–13
(Iran)	Karim Bagheri	Midfielder	1996–97, 2002–10
(Iran)	Edmond Bezik	Forward	1996–2001
(Iran)	Mehdi Hasheminasab	Defender	1997–2000
(Iran)	Hamed Kavianpour	Midfielder	1997–2002, 2003–06
(Iran)	Davoud Fanaei	Goalkeeper	1998–2003, 2004–06
(Iran)	Ali Ansarian	Defender	1998–2003, 2004–06
(Iran)	Ali Karimi	Midfielder	1998–2001, 2008–09, 2011–13
(Iran)	Payan Rafat	Forward	1999–2001, 2002–03
(Iran)	Mohammad Barzegar	Defender	1999–2004
(Iran)	Ebrahim Asadi	Midfielder	1999–2003, 2004–07
(Iran)	Hassan Khanmohammadi	Defender	2000–2005
(Iran)	Reza Jabbari	Midfielder	2000–2005
(Iran)	Sohrab Entezari	Forward	2001–06
(Iran)	Pejman Jamshidi	Midfielder	2001–05
(Iran)	Javad Kazemian	Forward	2003–06, 2011–13
(Iran)	Sheys Rezaei	Defender	2003–08, 2009–12
(Iran)	Mehrdad Oladi	Forward	2003–06, 2007, 2011–12
(Iran)	Pejman Nouri	Midfielder	2005–09
(Iran)	Mehrzad Madanchi	Forward	2005–07, 2012–13
(Iran)	Mehdi Vaezi	Goalkeeper	2006–09
(Iran)	Alireza Vahedi Nikbakht	Forward	2006–09
(Iran)	Hossein Badamaki	Midfielder	2006–12
(Iran)	Alireza Haghighi	Goalkeeper	2006–12, 2013
(Iran)	Sepehr Heydari	Defender	2007–11
(Iran)	Mohsen Khalili	Forward	2007–10
(Iran)	Hamidreza Aliasgari	Midfielder	2007–12, 2013–15
(Iran)	Maziar Zare	Midfielder	2008–09, 2010–12
(Iran)	Alireza Mohammad	Defender	2008–12
(Iran)	Hadi Norouzi ^{1}	Forward	2008–13, 2014–15
(Iran)	Mohammad Nouri	Midfielder	2010–15
(Iran)	Gholamreza Rezaei	Forward	2010–13
(Iran)	Alireza Nourmohammadi	Defender	2010–16
(Iran)	Hossein Kanaanizadegan	Defender	2012–14, 2019–21, 2023–present
(Iran)	Mohsen Bengar	Defender	2012–16
(Iran)	Jalal Hosseini	Defender	2012–14, 2016–22
(Iran)	Hossein Mahini	Defender	2012–14, 2016–19
(Iran)	Farshad Ahmadzadeh	Midfielder	2012–13, 2015–18, 2019, 2024–25
(Iran)	Omid Alishah	Midfielder	2013–16, 2018–26
(Iran)	Mohsen Mosalman	Midfielder	2013–14, 2015–18
(Iran)	Mehdi Taremi	Forward	2014–18
(Iran)	Ahmad Nourollahi	Midfielder	2014–16, 2017–21
(Iran)	Ali Alipour	Forward	2015–20, 2024–present
(Iran)	Kamal Kamyabinia	Midfielder	2015–23
(Iran)	Mohammad Ansari	Defender	2015–21
(Iran)	Vahid Amiri	Midfielder	2016–18, 2019–25
(Iran)	Alireza Beiranvand	Goalkeeper	2016–20, 2022–24
(Iran)	Soroush Rafiei	Midfielder	2017, 2019, 2022–26
(Iran)	Shoja' Khalilzadeh	Defender	2017–20
(Iran)	Siamak Nemati	Midfielder	2017–23
(Iraq)	Bashar Resan	Midfielder	2017–20
(Iran)	Mehdi Torabi	Midfielder	2019–20, 2021–24
(Iran)	Mehdi Shiri	Defender	2019–22
(Iran)	Mehdi Abdi	Forward	2019–23
(Iran)	Farshad Faraji	Defender	2020–25
(Iran)	Issa Alekasir	Forward	2020–23, 2024–25
(Iran)	Milad Sarlak	Midfielder	2020–23, 2024–26
(Iran)	Ali Nemati	Defender	2021–24
(Georgia (country))	Giorgi Gvelesiani	Defender	2022–25
(Iran)	Morteza Pouraliganji	Defender	2022–26
(Iran)	Saeid Sadeghi	Midfielder	2022–25
(Iran)	Mohammad Omri	Midfielder	2021–23, 2025–present
(Iran)	Mohammad Khodabandelou	Midfielder	2024–present
(Uzbekistan)	Oston Urunov	Midfielder	2024–present

^{1} He died of heart attack in sleep at the age of 30. He was captain of Persepolis at the time. the club decided to retire the squad number 24 forever in memory of him.

== List of foreign players ==
- Bold players are/were National players.

As of 20 November 2026

#	Name	Nat	Pos	App	Goal	from	Career	to
1	Billy McClure	(New Zealand)	MF	4	1	(England) Liverpool	1977	(New Zealand) Mount Wellington
2	Alan Whittle	(England)	MF	28	14	(England) Leyton Orient	1977–78	(England) Leyton Orient
3	Issa Traoré	(Mali)	MF	22	3	(Armenia) FC Pyunik	2003–04	(Iran) PAS Tehran
4	Saša Ilić	(North Macedonia)	GK	27	0	(Russia) Dynamo Saint Petersburg	2003–04	(Iran) Esteghlal Ahvaz
5	Christopher Wreh	(Liberia)	FW	0	0	(Scotland) St Mirren	2003	(England) Bishop's Stortford
6	Sambo Choji	(Nigeria)	FW	12	1	(Germany) 1. FC Saarbrücken (loan)	2004–05	(Germany) 1. FC Saarbrücken (loan return)
7	Ilče Pereski	(North Macedonia)	DF	14	0	(North Macedonia) Karaorman	2004–05	(Croatia) NK Rovinj
8	Jane Nikolovski	(North Macedonia)	GK	0	0	(North Macedonia) Napredok	2005	(Croatia) Slaven Belupo
9	Carlos Rivera	(Panama)	DF	0	0	(Colombia) Independiente Medellín	2005–06	(Panama) San Francisco
10	José Anthony Torres	(Panama)	DF	1	0	(Honduras) Marathón	2005	(Honduras) Victoria
11	Raphael Edereho	(Nigeria)	FW	7	1	(Finland) Kuopion Palloseura	2005–06	(Kazakhstan) Shakhter Karagandy
12	Jacques Elong Elong	(Cameroon)	MF	37	0	Mount Cameroon	2005–08	(Iran) Sepahan
13	Robert Caha	(Czech Republic)	DF	38	0	(Bulgaria) CSKA Sofia	2005–07	(Iran) Shahin Bushehr
14	Luay Salah	(Iraq)	FW	8	2	(Iraq) Al-Quwa Al-Jawiya	2006–07	(Iraq) Arbil SC
15	Zyad Chaabo	(Syria)	FW	11	3	(Syria) Al-Jaish (loan)	2007	(Syria) Al-Jaish (loan return)
16	Tarek Jabban	(Syria)	DF	6	0	(Syria) Al-Jaish (loan)	2007	(Syria) Al-Jaish (loan return)
17	Jorge Gaona	(Paraguay)	MF	2	0	(Paraguay) Cerro Porteño	2008	Retired
18	Mate Dragičević	(Croatia)	FW	12	3	(Australia) Perth Glory	2008	(Slovakia) DAC Dunajská Streda
19	Ibrahima Touré	(Senegal)	FW	31	13	(Iran) Paykan	2008–09	(Iran) Sepahan
20	Ivan Petrović	(Serbia)	MF	34	1	(Iran) Aboomoslem	2008–09	(Iran) Shahin Bushehr
21	Franck Atsou	(Togo)	MF	12	0	(Iran) Aboomoslem	2008–09	(Iran) Esteghlal Ahvaz
22	Paulo Roberto do Carmo	(Brazil)	FW	7	1	(Brazil) CENE (loan)	2008	(Brazil) CENE (loan return)
23	Shpejtim Arifi	(Germany)	FW	36	9	(Iran) Payam Khorasan	2009–11	(Iran) Tractor Sazi Tabriz
24	Tiago Alves Fraga	(Brazil)	MF	47	4	(Brazil) Mixto	2009–11	(Iran) PAS Hamedan
25	Wésley Brasilia	(Brazil)	FW	14	2	(Brazil) Brasiliense	2009–10	(South Korea) Daejeon Citizen
26	Hawar Mulla Mohammed	(Iraq)	FW	23	6	(Cyprus) Anorthosis	2009–10	(Iraq) Arbil SC
27	Hervé Oussalé ^{1}	(Burkina Faso)	FW	0	0	(Belgium) R.A.E.C. Mons	2010	(Algeria) MC Alger
28	Sékou Berthé	(Mali)	DF	7	0	(England) Plymouth	2010–11	Retired
29	Mamadou Tall	(Burkina Faso)	DF	12	0	(Portugal) U.D. Leiria	2011–12	(Burkina Faso) Santos
30	Éamon Zayed	(Libya)	FW	21	12	(Northern Ireland) Derry City	2011–13	(Iran) Aluminium Hormozgan
31	Asmir Avdukić ^{2}	(Bosnia and Herzegovina)	GK	7	0	(Bosnia and Herzegovina) Borac Banja Luka (loan)	2012	(Bosnia and Herzegovina) Borac Banja Luka (loan return)
32	Roberto Sousa^{3}	(Brazil)	MF	3	0	(Portugal) Marítimo	2012	(Portugal) Leixões
33	Nilson Corrêa	(Brazil)	GK	73	0	(Portugal) Vitória Guimarães	2012–15	(Portugal) Moreirense
34	Kwon Jun^{4}	(South Korea)	MF	0	0	(Indonesia) PSM Makassar	2013	(Indonesia) Persepam Madura United
35	Marko Perović	(Serbia)	MF	16	2	(Serbia) Red Star Belgrade	2013	(Serbia) OFK Beograd
36	Vlatko Grozdanoski	(North Macedonia)	MF	11	2	(China) Liaoning Whowin	2013	(North Macedonia) FK Vardar
37	Marko Šćepanović	(Montenegro)	MF	1	0	(Montenegro) Mladost Podgorica	2013–14	(Montenegro) Mladost Podgorica
38	Michael Umaña	(Costa Rica)	DF	51	0	(Costa Rica) Deportivo Saprissa	2014–16	(Costa Rica) Municipal Liberia
39	Tadeu	(Brazil)	FW	5	1	(Brazil) Náutico	2015	(Brazil) Boa Esporte
40	Fernando Gabriel	(Brazil)	MF	13	0	(Azerbaijan) Khazar Lankaran	2015	(Saudi Arabia) Al-Faisaly
41	Luka Marić	(Croatia)	DF	21	0	(Poland) Zawisza Bydgoszcz	2015–16	(Romania) Dinamo București
42	Jerry Bengtson	(Honduras)	FW	21	7	(United States) New England Revolution	2015–16	(Iran) Zob Ahan
43	Alexander Lobanov	(Uzbekistan)	GK	8	0	(Uzbekistan) Pakhtakor	2016	(Uzbekistan) Pakhtakor
44	Anthony Golec	(Australia)	DF	0	0	(Moldova) Sheriff Tiraspol	2016	(South Korea) Bucheon
45	Oleksiy Polyanskyi	(Ukraine)	DF	4	0	(Ukraine) Shakhtar Donetsk	2016–17	Retired
46	Volodymyr Pryyomov	(Ukraine)	FW	11	1	(Ukraine) Metalist Kharkiv	2016–17	(Ukraine) Oleksandriya
47	Božidar Radošević	(Croatia)	GK	42	0	(Hungary) Debreceni	2016–22	(Croatia) NK Varaždin
48	Godwin Mensha	(Nigeria)	FW	63	14	(Iran) Paykan	2017–19	(Iran) Esteghlal
49	Bashar Resan	(Iraq)	MF	103	5	(Iraq) Al-Quwa Al-Jawiya	2017–20	Qatar SC
50	Mario Budimir	(Croatia)	FW	18	2	(Croatia) Dinamo Zagreb	2019	(Croatia) Lokomotiva
51	Júnior Brandão	(Brazil)	FW	6	0	(Bulgaria) Ludogorets Razgrad (loan)	2019	(Bulgaria) Ludogorets Razgrad (loan return)
52	Christian Osaguona	(Nigeria)	FW	10	1	(South Korea) Jeju United	2020	(Iraq) Al-Shorta
53	Anthony Stokes	(Republic of Ireland)	FW	3	0	(Turkey) Adana Demirspor	2020	(Scotland) Livingston
54	Vahdat Hanonov	(Tajikistan)	DF	42	1	(Tajikistan) Istiklol	2021–24	(Iran) Sepahan
55	Manuchehr Safarov	(Tajikistan)	DF	5	0	(Tajikistan) Istiklol	2021–22	(Uzbekistan) Lokomotiv Tashkent
56	Sherzod Temirov	(Uzbekistan)	FW	12	1	(Uzbekistan) Pakhtakor	2022	(Iran) Paykan
57	Giorgi Gvelesiani	(Georgia (country))	DF	100	20	(Iran) Sepahan	2022–25	(Iran) Sepahan
58	Jürgen Locadia	(Curaçao)	FW	9	6	(Germany) VfL Bochum	2022	(China) Cangzhou Mighty Lions
59	Cheick Diabaté	(Mali)	FW	9	3	(Qatar) Al-Gharafa	2022–23	Retired
60	Leandro Pereira	(Brazil)	FW	11	1	(Japan) Gamba Osaka	2023	(Japan) Tochigi
61	Nabil Bahoui	(Sweden)	FW	11	1	Qatar SC	2023–24	(Sweden) Brommapojkarna
62	Abdelkarim Hassan	(Qatar)	DF	15	0	(Kuwait) Al-Jahra	2024	(Qatar) Al-Wakrah
63	Oston Urunov	(Uzbekistan)	MF	70	16	(Uzbekistan) Navbahor	2024–present	
64	Ayoub El Amloud	(Morocco)	DF	25	1	(Morocco) Wydad	2024–25	(Bahrain) Al-Khaldiya
65	Alexis Guendouz	(Algeria)	GK	37	0	(Algeria) CR Belouizdad	2024–25	(Algeria) MC Alger
66	Lucas João	(Angola)	FW	15	1	(Qatar) Umm Salal	2024	(Turkey) Ümraniyespor
67	Serdar Dursun	(Turkey)	FW	15	5	(Turkey) Alanyaspor	2025	(Turkey) Kocaelispor
68	Thievy Bifouma	(Republic of the Congo)	FW	27	5	(Iran) Esteghlal Khuzestan	2025–present	
69	Marko Bakić	(Montenegro)	MF	21	1	(Greece) OFI Crete	2025–present	
70	Serge Aurier	(Ivory Coast)	DF	5	0	(Turkey) Galatasaray	2025	Retired
71	Igor Sergeev	(Uzbekistan)	FW	14	4	(Uzbekistan) Pakhtakor	2026–present	
72	Dániel Gera	(Hungary)	DF	6	0	(Hungary) Diósgyőri VTK	2026–present	

- ^{1} He is dignasosed with Hepatitis B and had to leave Persepolis.
- ^{2} He only played 7 games in 2012 AFC Champions League.
- ^{3} Roberto Sousa & The Club reached agreement to terminate the contract because long term injury.
- ^{4} Kwon injured his ankle ligament, went to Korea for Treatment But released from club.

=== By nationality ===
Country	Players
Brazil	9
Croatia	4
Nigeria	4
North Macedonia	4
Uzbekistan	4
Iraq	3
Mali	3
Burkina Faso	2
Montenegro	2
Panama	2
Serbia	2
Syria	2
Tajikistan	2
Ukraine	2
Algeria	1
Angola	1
Australia	1
Bosnia and Herzegovina	1
Cameroon	1
Congo	1
Costa Rica	1
Curaçao	1
Czech Republic	1
England	1
Georgia	1
Germany	1
Honduras	1
Hungary	1
Ivory Coast	1
Liberia	1
Libya	1
Morocco	1
New Zealand	1
Paraguay	1
Qatar	1
Republic of Ireland	1
Senegal	1
South Korea	1
Sweden	1
Togo	1
Turkey	1

=== By Confederation ===
Country	Players
AFC	14
CAF	19
CONCACAF	5
CONMEBOL	10
OFC	1
UEFA	23

=== By Position ===
Country	Players
GK	7
DF	18
MF	17
FW	30

== Notes ==
A. Hossein Kalani is top goal scorer of 1970–71 with 7 goals and 1971–72 with 11 goals.

B. Safar Iranpak is top goal scorer of 1971–72 with 11 goals.

C. Farshad Pious is top goal scorer of 1991–92 with 11 goals and 1994–95 with 20 goals.

D. Ali Daei is top goal scorer of 2003–04 with 16 goals.

E. Mohsen Khalili is top goal scorer of 2007–08 with 18 goals.

F. Mehdi Taremi is top goal scorer of 2015–16 with 16 goals and 2016–17 with 18 goals.

G. Ali Alipour is top goal scorer of 2017–18 with 19 goals.
