= 1968 AFC Asian Cup squads =

Squads for the 1968 AFC Asian Cup played in Iran.

== Iran ==
Head coach: (Iran) Mahmoud Bayati

No.	Pos.	Player	Date of birth (age)	Caps	Goals	Club
	GK	Aziz Asli	9 April 1938 (aged 30)			(Football Federation Islamic Republic of Iran) Persepolis
	GK	Faramarz Zelli	31 December 1940 (aged 27)			(Football Federation Islamic Republic of Iran) Taj
	MF	Abdollah Saedi	24 August 1942 (aged 26)			(Football Federation Islamic Republic of Iran) Oghab
	DF	Mehrab Shahrokhi	2 February 1944 (aged 24)			(Football Federation Islamic Republic of Iran) Persepolis
	DF	Jafar Kashani	21 March 1944 (aged 24)			(Football Federation Islamic Republic of Iran) Persepolis
	DF	Hassan Habibi	7 February 1939 (aged 29)			(Football Federation Islamic Republic of Iran) Pas
	DF	Mostafa Arab	13 August 1941 (aged 27)			(Football Federation Islamic Republic of Iran) Oghab
	MF	Karo Haghverdian	11 January 1945 (aged 23)			(Football Federation Islamic Republic of Iran) Taj
	MF	Fariborz Esmaeili	1 July 1940 (aged 28)			(Football Federation Islamic Republic of Iran) Oghab
	MF	Parviz Ghelichkhani	4 December 1945 (aged 22)			(Football Federation Islamic Republic of Iran) Taj
	MF	Gholam Hossein Farzami	12 June 1948 (aged 20)	8	1	(Football Federation Islamic Republic of Iran) Taj
	FW	Asghar Sharafi	22 December 1942 (aged 26)			(Football Federation Islamic Republic of Iran) Pas
	FW	Hossein Kalani	23 January 1945 (aged 23)			(Football Federation Islamic Republic of Iran) Persepolis
	FW	Akbar Eftekhari	07 December 1943 (aged 25)			(Football Federation Islamic Republic of Iran) Taj
	FW	Homayoun Behzadi	20 June 1942 (aged 26)			(Football Federation Islamic Republic of Iran) Persepolis
	MF	Ali Jabbari	20 July 1946 (aged 20)			(Football Federation Islamic Republic of Iran) Taj

== Israel ==
Head coach: (Socialist Federal Republic of Yugoslavia) Milovan Ćirić

No.	Pos.	Player	Date of birth (age)	Caps	Goals	Club
	GK	Itzhak Vissoker	18 September 1944 (aged 23)	14	0	(Israel Football Association) Hapoel Petah Tikva
	GK	Haim Levin	3 March 1937 (aged 31)	15	0	(Israel Football Association) Maccabi Tel Aviv
	DF	Menahem Bello	26 December 1947 (aged 20)	14	0	(Israel Football Association) Maccabi Tel Aviv
	DF	Dani Shmulevich	29 November 1940 (aged 27)	23	0	(Israel Football Association) Maccabi Haifa
	DF	Itzhak Marili	12 May 1945 (aged 22)	2	0	(Israel Football Association) Hapoel Jerusalem
	DF	David Karako	11 February 1944 (aged 24)	3	0	(Israel Football Association) Maccabi Tel Aviv
	DF	Itzhak Drucker	3 June 1947 (aged 20)	6	0	(Israel Football Association) Hapoel Petah Tikva
	DF	Zvi Rosen	23 June 1947 (aged 20)	2	0	(Israel Football Association) Maccabi Tel Aviv
	MF	Dani Borsuk	16 February 1944 (aged 24)	6	0	(Israel Football Association) Hapoel Tel Aviv
	MF	Haim Nurieli	1 May 1943 (aged 25)	2	0	(Israel Football Association) Hapoel Tel Aviv
	MF	Moshe Asis	9 October 1943 (aged 24)	13	1	(Israel Football Association) Maccabi Tel Aviv
	MF	Shmuel Rosenthal	22 April 1947 (aged 21)	14	1	(Israel Football Association) Hapoel Petah Tikva
	FW	George Borba	12 July 1944 (aged 23)	9	4	(Israel Football Association) Hapoel Tel Aviv
	FW	Giora Spiegel	27 July 1947 (aged 20)	10	5	(Israel Football Association) Maccabi Tel Aviv
	FW	Mordechai Spiegler	19 August 1944 (aged 23)	27	13	(Israel Football Association) Maccabi Netanya
	FW	Moshe Romano	6 May 1946 (aged 22)	5	1	(Israel Football Association) Shimshon Tel Aviv
	FW	Rahamim Talbi	17 May 1943 (aged 24)	18	5	(Israel Football Association) Maccabi Tel Aviv
	FW	Roby Young	15 May 1942 (aged 25)	37	5	(Israel Football Association) Hapoel Haifa

== Burma ==
Head coach: (Myanmar) Sein Hlaing

No.	Pos.	Player	Date of birth (age)	Caps	Goals	Club
1	GK	Tin Aung	8 May 1946 (aged 22)			(Myanmar Football Federation) Myanmar Army
2	DF	Maung Maung Myint				(Myanmar Football Federation) Myanmar Army
3	DF	Maung Maung Tin				(Myanmar Football Federation) Posts and Telecoms
4	DF	Myo Win Nyunt				(Myanmar Football Federation) Customs
5	DF	Maung Hla Pe				
6	MF	Aye Maung Gyi	20 August 1950 (aged 17)			(Myanmar Football Federation) Construction FC
7	MF	Aye Maung Lay				(Myanmar Football Federation) Burma Air Force
8	MF	Aung Khi			1	
9	FW	Suk Bahadur (captain)	15 May 1935 (aged 32)	4	1	(Myanmar Football Federation) Myanmar Army
10	FW	Ba Pu				(Myanmar Football Federation) Construction FC
11	FW	Win Aung				
12	GK	Tin Win				
13	DF	Pe Khin				
14	MF	Tin Han				
15	MF	Hla Kya				
16	MF	Ye Nyunt	3 June 1950 (aged 17)			(Myanmar Football Federation) Customs
17	MF	Saw Win				
18	MF	Soe Myint				
19	FW	Tin Aung Moe		3		
20	FW	Hla Htay		4	1	(Myanmar Football Federation) Customs
21	FW	Yeni Yot	7 October 1941 (aged 26)	1	0	(Myanmar Football Federation) Customs

== Hong Kong ==
Head coach: (Hong Kong) Tang Sum (鄧森)

No.	Pos.	Player	Date of birth (age)	Caps	Goals	Club
	GK	Lo Tak Kuen	1940 (aged 27–28)			(Hong Kong) Happy Valley
	GK	Mui Wing Tat (梅永達)				(Hong Kong) Citizen
	DF	Chan Siu Hung (陳少雄)				Hong Kong FC
	DF	Tse Kwok Keung (謝國強)				(Hong Kong) Sing Tao SC
	DF	Liu Kam Ming (廖錦明)				(Hong Kong) Royal Air Force
	DF	Cheng Yung Yu (鄭潤如)				(Hong Kong) Tung Sing FC
	DF	Chan Ping Kwong (陳炳光)				(Hong Kong) Royal Air Force
	DF	Lai Po Chung (黎寶忠)				(Hong Kong) Yuen Long District
	MF	Kung Wah Kit (龔華傑)				(Hong Kong) Biu Chun Rangers FC
	MF	Lee Kwok Keung (李國強)				(Hong Kong) Tung Sing FC
	FW	Yip Sheung Wa (葉尚華)				Hong Kong Rangers FC
	MF	Cheung Yiu Kwok (張耀國)				(Hong Kong) Yueng Long District
	FW	Ho Cheung Yau	1933 (aged 34–35)			(Hong Kong) South China
	FW	Yuen Kuen To (袁權韜)				(Hong Kong) Citizen
	FW	Yuen Kuen Yik (袁權益)				(Hong Kong) Biu Chun Rangers FC
	MF	Cheng Kwok Kun (鄭國根)				(Hong Kong) Sing Tao SC
	MF	Ho Yiu Keung (何耀強)				Hong Kong FC
	FW	Kwong Yin Ying (鄺演英)				(Hong Kong) Happy Valley

Hong Kong national team and Republic of China national team shared same fodder of players during pre-1971. Most (if not all) the players playing in the Hong Kong football league. The ROC team practically the A-team, while Hong Kong practically the B-team, with lesser quality of players.

== Taiwan ==
Head coach: (Taiwan) Pau King Yin (鮑景賢)

No.	Pos.	Player	Date of birth (age)	Caps	Goals	Club
	FW	Wong Chi Keung (黃志強)	28 July 1936 (aged 31)			
	DF	Law Pak(羅北)	25 May 1933 (aged 34)			(Hong Kong) Eastern
	FW	Kwok Chiu Ming (郭秋明)				
	DF	Tam Hon San (譚漢新)				
	DF	Pang Chi Kwong (彭志光)				
	MF	Chan Hung Ping (陳鴻平)	6 December 1942 (aged 25)			(Hong Kong) Yuen Long
	MF	Lam Sheung Yee (林尚義)	7 November 1934 (aged 33)			(Hong Kong) Eastern
	MF	Wong Man Wai (黃文偉)	23 September 1943 (aged 24)			(Hong Kong) South China
	DF	Kwok Mun Wah (郭滿華)				
	FW	Lo Kwok Tai (羅國泰)	25 August 1929 (aged 38)			(Hong Kong) Eastern
	DF	Mak Tian Fu (麥天富)				
	FW	Tsang Geng Hung (曾鏡洪)				
	MF	Chan Tai Wu (陳泰和)				
	DF	Lam Lou Siu (林魯書)				
	FW	Hui Zung Ming (許忠明)				
	GK	Ngai Pak Hong (魏伯康)				
	GK	Chan Kwong Hung (陳光雄)				
