= Nasser Hejazi =

Iranian footballer and coach

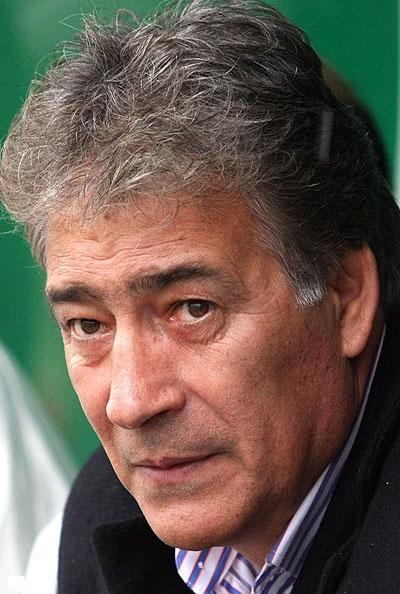
- Hejazi in December 2008

Personal information
- Date of birth: 14 December 1949
- Place of birth: Tehran, Iran
- Date of death: 23 May 2011 (aged 61)
- Place of death: Tehran, Iran
- Height: 1.85 m (6 ft 1 in)
- Position: Goalkeeper

Senior career*
Years	Team	Apps	(Gls)
1964–1969	Nader		
1969–1976	Taj		
1976–1980	Shahbaz		
1980–1986	Esteghlal		
1987	Dhaka Mohammedan		

International career
1969–1980	Iran	62	(0)

Managerial career
- 1987–1992: Dhaka Mohammedan
- 1988–1989: Shahrdari Kerman
- 1989: Bangladesh
- 1990–1992: Bank Tejarat
- 1992–1993: Shahrdari Kerman
- 1994–1995: Sepahan
- 1995–1996: Mashin Sazi
- 1996–1999: Esteghlal Tehran
- 1999–2001: Zob Ahan
- 2001–2002: Esteghlal Rasht
- 2003: Mashin Sazi
- 2003–2004: Esteghlal Ahvaz
- 2006–2007: Nassaji Mazandaran
- 2007: Esteghlal Tehran
Medal record
Representing Iran
AFC Asian Cup
Gold medal – first place	1972 Thailand	Team competition
Bronze medal – third place	1980 Kuwait	Team competition
Asian Games
Gold medal – first place	1974 Iran	Team competition
- * Club domestic league appearances and goals

Nasser Hejazi (Persian: ناصر حجازی, nāser hejāzi; 14 December 1949 – 23 May 2011), nicknamed "the legendary Iranian goalkeeper", was an Iranian football player and coach who most notably played for Esteghlal (Taj).Considered as the best goalkeeper in the history of Iranian football and Asia.

He was capped 62 times for the Iran national football team. In 2000, the Asian Football Confederation ranked him the second best Asian goalkeeper of the 20th century.

He was goalkeeper of Iran national team in the 1960s and 1970s and won the AFC Asian Cup on two occasions in 1972 and 1976, and Asian Games title once, and competed in the 1972 Munich Olympics and 1976 Montreal Olympics and 1978 FIFA World Cup.

As a manager, he won an Azadegan League in 1998 and a Bangladesh League in 1988, as well as a runner-up place in 1998–99 AFC Champions League.

== Early life ==
Hejazi was born on 14 December 1949 in Piranshahr, Iran. His father, Ali Akbar had a real estate agency in Tehran and was an Iranian Azerbaijani from Tabriz. He was admitted to Allameh Tabatabai University in 1977. He was later enrolled in Nader F.C. in 1964 and played for club until 1965. After that, he signed a contract with Taj Tehran and started his career in a professional club.

== Club career ==
Hejazi was the goalkeeper of the Taj Tehran and Iran during the 1970s. Hejazi first broke into the Taj side when he was only 18 years old and while a member of the now defunct Nader FC. He won the Asian Club Championship in 1970; he also won the Iranian league in 1971 as well as 1975 and was positioned second in 1974. Further on, he won the Hazfi Cup in 1977.

In summer 1977 he changed the club joining Shahbaz Tehran, trying to win the 1977–78 Takht Jamshid Cup with his famous National teammates Gholam Hossein Mazloumi, Nasrollah Abdollahi, Ebrahim Ghasempour and Hamid Majd Teymouri. So it was a tremendous surprise, that Shahbaz could only reach the 11th place. In the following year Shahbaz was leading the ranking in the season 1978/79, when in autumn 1978 – due to the political uprisings, which ended with the Iranian Revolution in February 1979 – the season was canceled.

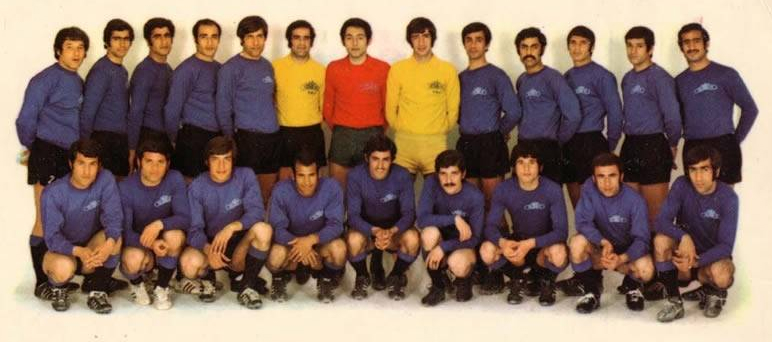
Taj Tehran after winning the Asian Champion Club Tournament in 1970

After the 1978 FIFA World Cup, Hejazi received an offer from Manchester United. He trained and played with the club for a month, even appearing in a reserve matches against Stoke City and Bolton Wanderers Manchester United manager Dave Sexton wanted Hejazi to stay for another two or three months before officially signing a contract with him, but there was no-one at the IRFF at the time of the Iranian Revolution to arrange the extension, which led to Manchester United signing Gary Bailey instead.

Hejazi remained as Esteghlal's main goalkeeper until 1986. There he won the Tehran Province League in 1983 and 1985 and the runners-up position in 1982.

His last station was at Bangladeshi club Mohammedan in Dhaka, where he served as player-cum-coach and won his last league title as a player in 1987. He made his only appearance in the final league game against arch-rivals Dhaka Abahani, coming on as a substitute in the last 21 minutes for the injured Sayeed Hassan Kanan. With Mohammedan needing a victory to keep their title hopes alive, Hejazi led the team to a 3–2 win, securing a play-off match, which the club went on to win 2–0 over two legs.

== International career ==
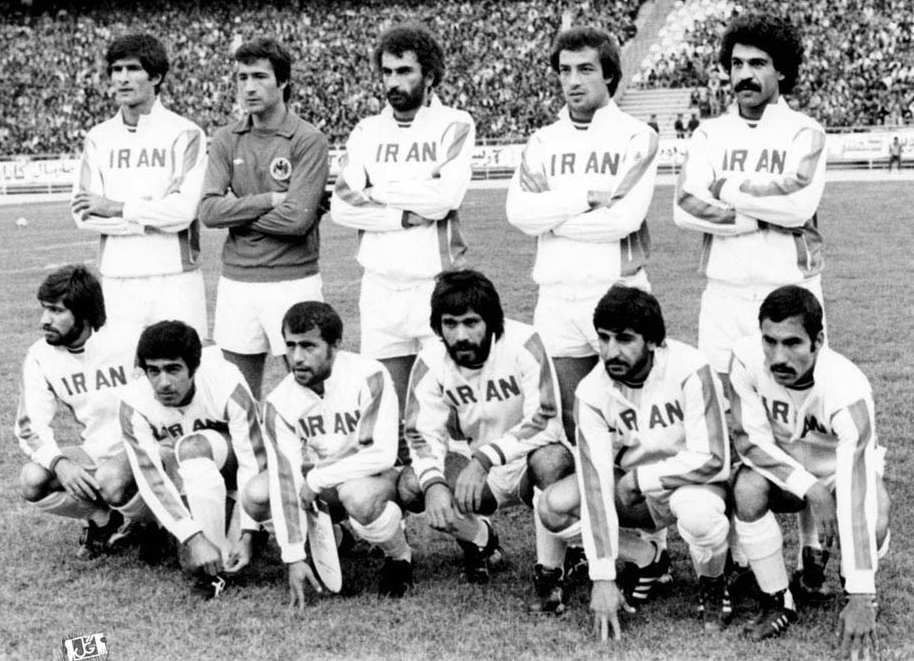
Iran's squad in a 1978 World Cup qualification match against South Korea in Tehran on 11 November 1977

Hejazi made his debut for the Iran national team in 1969 against Pakistan. He became the first-choice goalkeeper in time for the 1972 Asian Cup, which Iran won for a second time in a row. Later that year, he was part of the Iran squad for the Olympic Games in Munich, where Iran failed to qualify for the second round. In 1974, he shared goalkeeping duties with Bahram Mavaddat and Mansour Rashidi at the Asian Games in Tehran, but played a key role in the 1–0 victory over Israel in the final. In 1976, he was again part of the squad that won the Asian Cup, but as second-choice behind Rashidi, before returning to the starting role for the 1976 Olympics in Montreal, playing in all three matches as Iran reached the quarter-finals.

Hejazi continued as Iran's starting goalkeeper at the 1978 FIFA World Cup in Argentina, but Iran conceded eight goals in their three games, managing just one draw. He was then named captain for the 1980 Asian Cup in Kuwait; Iran finished top of their group and faced the host nation in the semi-finals but lost 2–1 as Kuwait went on to win the title. After the tournament, a member of Iran's Physical Education Department implemented a policy in which athletes older than 27 years of age would no longer be allowed to compete internationally. Hejazi was effectively forced to retire from international football, despite being only 29 years old at the time of implementation.

=== International caps ===
Iran
Year	Apps	Goals
1969	2	0
1970	4	0
1971	4	0
1972	11	0
1973	4	0
1974	2	0
1975	4	0
1976	4	0
1977	9	0
1978	6	0
1980	12	0
Total	62	0

== Managerial career ==
Hejazi coached Bangladeshi football club Mohammedan from 1987 to 1992. During his time, Bangladeshi football was enlightened with the modern day technique of football and embraced top football coaching. At continental level, Hejazi guided Mohammedan to the Semi-Final Group round of the 1988–89 Asian Club Championship, by defeating Iranian club Persepolis 2–1. The Bangladeshi Football Federation rewarded him by making him national team coach in 1989.

During the 1990s, Hejazi was the manager of a number of football clubs including the Mohammedan SC, the Esteghlal (former Taj) and Esteghlal Ahvaz. During his tenure with the Esteghlal, Hejazi won the Iranian League in 1998, then took the club to the final match of the Asian Champions League in 1999. They were beaten by the Júbilo Iwata in Tehran. During his years as a coach, Hejazi was the first to discover several talented Iranian football players, including Rahman Rezaei in Zobahan and Alireza Akbarpour in Machine Sazi Tabriz. In early August 2006 Hejazi announced he signed a one-year contract as head coach of Azadegan League outfit Nassaji Mazandaran. He resigned from the post on 19 January 2007. On 5 August 2007, he was appointed as head coach of Esteghlal for a second time but he was sacked by club on 8 November 2007 because of bad results after 14 matches.

Team	From	To	Record						
Team	From	To	G	W	D	L	GF	GA	+/-
Esteghlal	February 1996	December 1999	81	39	25	17	127	73	+54
Esteghlal	August 2007	November 2007	14	5	5	4	21	19	+2

== Honours ==
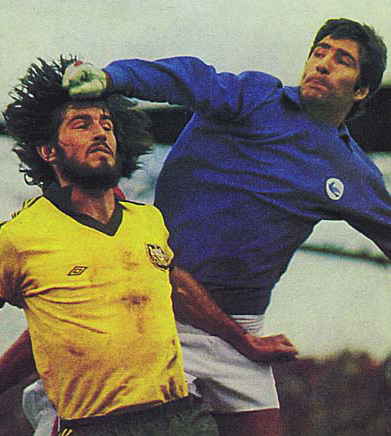
Hejazi (right) in a match against Australia in Melbourne, 1977.

=== Player ===
Esteghlal

- Asian Club Championship: 1970
- Iranian Football League: 1970–71, 1974–75
- Tehran Provincial League: 1982–83, 1984–85

Dhaka Mohammedan

- Dhaka First Division League: 1987

Iran

- Asian Cup: 1972
- Asian Games: 1974

Iran XI

- Afghanistan Republic Day Cup runner-up: 1977

Individual

- AFC Asian Cup Fans' All Time Best XI: 2018
- IFFHS Best Goalkeepers of the Century Xxth
- IFFHS All Time Iran Dream Team
- AFC Asian Cup Team of the Tournament: 1980
- IFFHS The second best Asian Goalkeeper of the 20th century
- Best Goalkeeper of the Asian Club Championship: 1970
- Best Goalkeeper of the AFC Asian Cup: 1980
- Best Goalkeeper of the Iranian Football League: 1973

=== Manager ===
Dhaka Mohammedan

- Dhaka First Division League: 1987, 1988–89
- Federation Cup: 1989

Bangladesh

- South Asian Games Silver medal: 1989

Esteghlal

- Iranian Football League: 1997–98
- Asian Club Championship runner-up: 1998–99

== Political career ==
=== Presidential candidacy ===
On 3 November 2004, Hejazi announced his nomination for 2005 presidential election. He was rejected by the Guardian Council of the Constitution of Islamic Republic of Iran, arguing his lack of political career prior to the election. Later on, he became a supporter of Ali Akbar Hashemi Rafsanjani.

In 2009 presidential election, he supported Mir-Hossein Mousavi.

=== Opposition to Ahmadinejad ===
He was an opponent to the Economic reform plan of President Mahmoud Ahmadinejad's Government. In April 2011, he made a statement regarding the plan: "I'm very sorry for our people, they have oil, petroleum and ... but some of them are poor".

It is known that after this comment, he was unofficially banned from Iranian Television Network. This was later revoked due to his popularity and the perceived side effects that could have come from this decision.

== Personal life ==
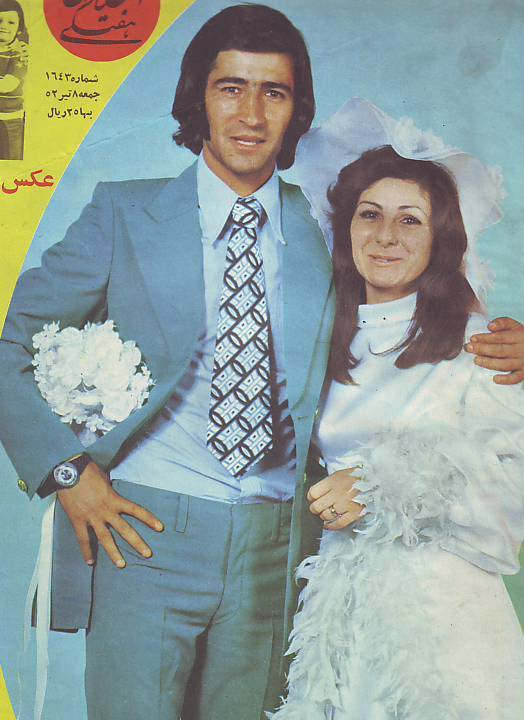
Hejazi with his spouse in 1973

Hejazi married Behnaz Shafie in 1973. They had two children: one daughter, Atoosa and one son, Attila, who both grew up to play soccer just like their father. Attila had been playing in Esteghlal B from 1997 to 2004 and Atoosa was the captain of Iran national women futsal team. Atoosa is married to an Iranian retired soccer player Saeed Ramezani who formerly played for Zob Ahan, Sepahan and Foolad in the Iran Pro League. They have a son named Amir Arsalan. He was also a part of plot within Season 3 in Homeland.

== Cancer struggle and death ==
Hejazi was diagnosed with aggressive lung cancer in late 2009. While trying to resume normal daily activities as a coach, his illness forced him to be hospitalised. Hejazi went into a coma on 20 May 2011 as he was watching the match between Esteghlal and Pas Hamedan soccer teams in the final week of the Iran Pro League. On 23 May 2011, after being unable to recover from a stroke, he died at 10:55 a.m. in Kasra Hospital in Tehran. His funeral was held on 25 May 2011 in Azadi Stadium in western Tehran and his body was buried in the Behesht-e Zahra cemetery in southern Tehran on the same day as his final resting place. More than 20,000 people attended his funeral.

Hejazi's popularity went beyond Iran's borders as Manchester United manager Sir Alex Ferguson expressed the club's sympathy for Hejazi's illness in April 2010. In a message, President Mahmoud Ahmadinejad paid homage to Hejazi and characterised him as a renowned and good-tempered Iranian football figure who offered valuable services to national sport.

== Legacy ==
Hejazi is considered by many to be the best Iranian and Asian goalkeeper of all time. Hejazi was a member of the all-conquering Iran national team of the 1960s and 1970s that won the Asian Cup a record three times in a row and represented Iran at two Summer Olympics as well as 1978 FIFA World Cup. After his death, it was proposed that a new stadium named after Hejazi would be built in Tehran. Esteghlal's training camp was also renamed to Hejazi Training Camp.

== See also ==
- List of Bangladesh national football team managers
