= Ebrahim Ashtiani =

Iranian footballer (1942–2017)

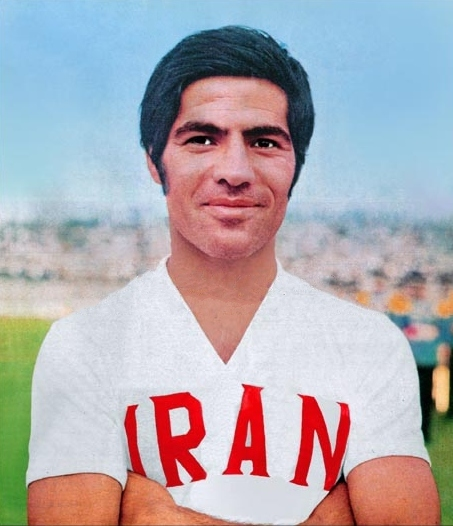

Personal information
- Full name: Ebrahim Ashtiani
- Date of birth: 4 January 1942
- Place of birth: Tehran, Iran
- Date of death: 24 October 2017 (aged 75)
- Place of death: Tehran, Iran
- Height: 1.72 m (5 ft 8 in)
- Position: Defender

Youth career
- 1961–1965: Shahin

Senior career*
Years	Team	Apps	(Gls)
1964–1968	Shahin		
1968–1976	Persepolis	162	(2)
1969–1970	→ Paykan (loan)		

International career
1968–1974	Iran	35	(1)
- * Club domestic league appearances and goals

Ebrahim Ashtiani (Persian: ابراهیم اشتیانی; January 1942 – 24 October 2017) was an Iranian football player. He played for the Iran national football team and spent most of his career at Persepolis. His son Ardalan is also a professional football player.

== Club career ==
=== First years ===
He began his playing career with Boostan and Poolad (under-19 and under-23 team of Shahin) and was promoted to the first team in 1964, by Abbas Ekrami. He showed good performances and became one of the starting players after the 1966–67 season. He received a red card in a match against Tehranjavan, this led to an involvement between players and coaches. Two days after the match, IFF (Iran's football association) ruled a one-year suspension for Shahin but club officials announced the dissolution of Shahin.

=== Persepolis ===
After Shahin was dissolved, Ashtiani and many other players of the team joined another Tehran based club, Persepolis. He played with the team in Asian Club Championship in his first season. After he was recalled from loan in 1970, he showed good form in a friendly match against Hamburg SV which the German club offered him a contract to join to the team, which Ashtiani rejected to play for Persepolis until his retirement. He also had bids from Manchester City and Al-Arabi. He assisted the first goal of Persepolis in a historic 6–0 derby win to Hossein Kalani. After the retirement of Persepolis captains Jafar Kashani and Homayoun Behzadi, Ashtiani became captain of the club when he was only 28 making him the youngest captain of Persepolis, a record that was broken by Alireza Haghighi in 2010. He retired in the summer of 1976 at the age of 30.

=== Loan to Paykan ===
Ashtiani and many other players of Persepolis joined Paykan on loan after an agreement between the two club's presidents. He played for one season at Paykan and was invited for the first time to the Iran national football team.

== International career ==
Ashtiani won the Asian Cup in Thailand in 1972 as well as the football tournament of the 1974 Asian Games in Tehran. He made 35 appearances for the Iran national football team from 1969 to 1974 and was part of the Iranian team competing in the football tournament of the Olympics in Munich 1972.

== After retirement ==
He was an assistant coach of Büyük Vatankhah at Persepolis in 1974–75 season, while he was also club captain. Later, he was chosen as an assistant coach of Iran national under-23 football team. He then managed Poora for two seasons in 2nd Division. After the resignation of Persepolis' longtime team manager, Mahmoud Khordbin, he was appointed as team manager of Persepolis and held the post until Khordbin's reappointment. He was part of the club's technical committee for years.

He died on 24 October 2017 after long illness.

== Honours ==
=== Club ===
Shahin

- Tehran Football League: 1965

Persepolis

- Iranian Football League: 1971–72 1973–74, 1974–75 (Runner-up), 1975–76

=== National ===
- AFC Asian Cup: 1968, 1972

=== Individual ===
- Iranian Footballer of the Year: 1971
- AFC Asian Cup most valuable player: 1972
