= Myanmar at the AFC Asian Cup =

National football delegation

Myanmar has made only one appearance at the AFC Asian Cup as Burma, during the 1968 AFC Asian Cup in which they finished as runner-up.

During 1950s to 1970s, Burma was one of Asia's football powerhouses and they had been considered as a tough contender for the title in Asian Cup. Burma, however only qualified for one Asian Cup, in 1968. Since then, due to internal struggles, conflicts and economic downturn, Burma had failed to manage success and was unable to qualify for the Asian Cup. As for 2023, this remains as their only appearance.

== Iran 1968 ==
| Pos | Team | Pld | W | D | L | GF | GA | GD | Pts | Qualification |
|---|---|---|---|---|---|---|---|---|---|---|
| 1 | Iran (H) | 4 | 4 | 0 | 0 | 11 | 2 | +9 | 8 | Champions |
| 2 | Burma | 4 | 2 | 1 | 1 | 5 | 4 | +1 | 5 | Runners-up |
| 3 | Israel | 4 | 2 | 0 | 2 | 11 | 5 | +6 | 4 | Third place |
| 4 | Republic of China | 4 | 0 | 2 | 2 | 3 | 10 | −7 | 2 | Fourth place |
| 5 | Hong Kong | 4 | 0 | 1 | 3 | 2 | 11 | −9 | 1 | Fifth place |

Source: RSSSF
(H) Hosts
11 May 1968

| Republic of China | 1–1 | Burma |
|---|---|---|
| Lim Lu-shoor 63' | | Maung Hla Htay 13' |

Amjadieh Stadium, Tehran

14 May 1968

| Burma | 1–0 | Israel |
|---|---|---|
| Suk Bahadur 42' |

Amjadieh Stadium, Tehran
Attendance: 30,000
Referee: Norman Boswell (Malaysia)

16 May 1968

| Burma | 1–3 | Iran |
|---|---|---|
| Aung Khi 50' | | Kalani 2'; Eftekhari 60'; Behzadi 71' |

Amjadieh Stadium, Tehran
Attendance: 30,000
Referee: Natrajan (India)

18 May 1968

| Burma | 2–0 | Hong Kong |
|---|---|---|
| Aung Khin 80'; Suk Bahadur 85' |

Amjadieh Stadium, Tehran

== Asian Cup record ==
Asian Cup Record
| Year | Round | GP | W | D | L | GF | GA |
|---|---|---|---|---|---|---|---|
| (Hong Kong) 1956 to (Israel) 1964 | Withdrew | | | | | | |
| (Iran) 1968 | Runners-up | 4 | 2 | 1 | 1 | 5 | 4 |
| (Thailand) 1972 to (Qatar) 1988 | Withdrew | | | | | | |
| (Japan) 1992 | Did not enter | | | | | | |
| (United Arab Emirates) 1996 to (China) 2004 | Did not qualify | | | | | | |
| (Indonesia) (Malaysia) (Thailand) (Vietnam) 2007 | Did not enter | | | | | | |
| (Qatar) 2011 | Did not qualify | | | | | | |
| (Australia) 2015 | Did not qualify | | | | | | |
| (United Arab Emirates) 2019 | Did not qualify | | | | | | |
| (Qatar) 2023 | Did not qualify | | | | | | |
| (Saudi Arabia) 2027 | Did not qualify | | | | | | |
| Total | Best: Runner-up | 4 | 2 | 1 | 1 | 5 | 4 |
