= Mohammad Reza Khalatbari =

Mohammad Reza Khalatbari may refer to:

- Mohammad Reza Khalatbari (footballer, born 1948), Iranian footballer
- Mohammad Reza Khalatbari (footballer, born 1983), Iranian footballer
