= Tin Aung =

Burmese footballer

Personal information
- Date of birth: 8 May 1946 (age 80)
- Position: Goalkeeper

Senior career*
Years	Team	Apps	(Gls)
- Burma Army

International career
- Myanmar
Medal record
Representing Burma
Men's Football
Asian Games
Gold medal – first place	1966 Bangkok	Team
Gold medal – first place	1970 Bangkok	Team
AFC Asian Cup
Runner-up	1968 Iran	Team
- * Club domestic league appearances and goals

Tin Aung (born 8 May 1946) is a Burmese footballer. He competed in the men's tournament at the 1972 Summer Olympics.
