= Javad Allahverdi =

Iranian footballer

Personal information
- Full name: Javad Allahverdi
- Date of birth: June 16, 1952 (age 74)
- Place of birth: Saveh, Iran
- Position: Defender

Senior career*
Years	Team	Apps	(Gls)
1970–1974	Taj	32	(0)
1974–1981	Persepolis	52	(0)

International career
1978	Iran	2	(0)
- * Club domestic league appearances and goals

Javad Allahverdi is a retired Iranian footballer of Taj and Persepolis. Also he was a member of Iran national football team in World Cup 1978.

== Club career ==
Allahverdi started his career playing for Taj. There he could win the Asian Championship Club Tournament in 1970; he also won the Iranian league in 1971 as well as the second place in 1974.

After the disastrous 0-6 against Persepolis F.C. in September 1973, where he was identified as the weakest player of Taj, he was kicked out of the team, so he changed to Persepolis F.C. in summer 1974. There he could win the Iranian championship in 1976 and reach runner-up position in 1975, in 1977 and in 1978.

After the Iranian Revolution he remained playing for Persepolis winning the Iranian nationwide tournament Espandi Cup and the Tehran Hazfi Cup in 1979 as well as reaching the runners-up position in Tehran Province League and in Tehran Hazfi Cup in 1981.

== International career ==
Allahverdi was a member of the Iranian team competing in the football tournament of the Olympic Tournament in Munich in 1972. He also participated at the 1978 FIFA World Cup as a member of the squad, where he played the third and last match Irans against Peru.
