= Nasser Ebrahimi =

Iranian footballer and manager

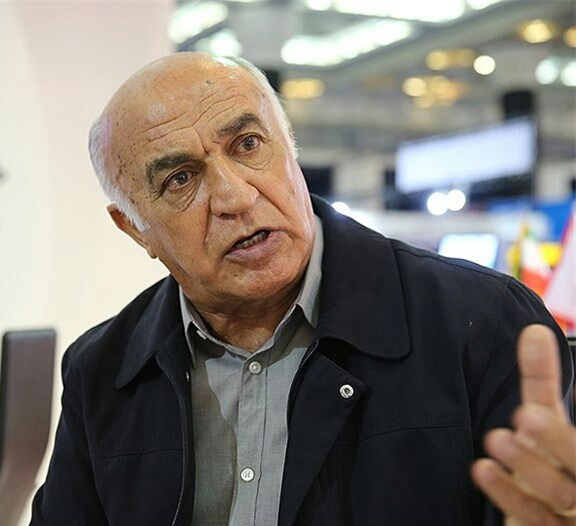

Personal information
- Date of birth: 15 May 1942 (age 84)
- Place of birth: Isfahan, Iran

Youth career
- 1962–1965: Shahin

Senior career*
Years	Team	Apps	(Gls)
1965–1968	Shahin		
1968–1970	Taj		
1970–1979	Bargh		

Managerial career
- 1980–??: Iran (assistant)
- 1982: Iran
- 1984–1985: Iran
- 1985–1986: Iran (assistant)
- 1988–1992: Iran (assistant)
- 1992–1996: Persep Persepolis olis (assistant)
- 1996–1998: Rah Ahan (assistant)
- 1998: Oghab
- 1998–2003: Persepolis (assistant)
- 2005–2006: Persepolis (assistant)
- * Club domestic league appearances and goals

Nasser Ebrahimi (born 15 May 1941 in Isfahan, Iran) is an Iranian retired football player and manager. Ebrahimi began playing football with the Shahin in the age of 22. He was joined to the Taj in 1968. He also played for Bargh from 1970 to 1979. He was retired in 1979.

He was assistant head coach of Iran for three times. He was head coach of national team at the 1982 Quaid-e-Azam International Tournament, and later again from 1984 to 1985. He was also assistant head coach of Persepolis.
