= Nasrollah Abdollahi =

Iranian football coach and former player

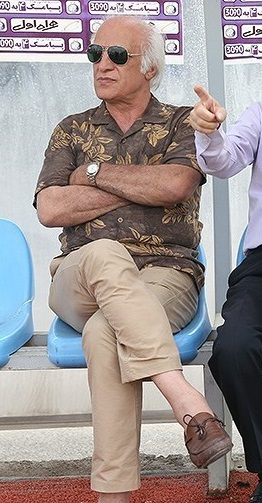

Personal information
- Full name: Nasrollah Abdollahi
- Date of birth: 2 September 1951 (age 75)
- Place of birth: Tehran, Iran
- Height: 1.83 m (6 ft 0 in)
- Position: Defender

Youth career
- 1960–1965: Guard

Senior career*
| Years | Team | Apps | (Gls) |
| 1965–1970 | Guard | | |
| 1970–1974 | Taj | | |
| 1974–1976 | Rah Ahan | | |
| 1976–1985 | Shahin | | |

International career
| 1976–1980 | Iran | 38 | (0) |

Managerial career
- 1985–1988: Shahin
- 1994–1995: Esteghlal
- 1997–2000: Saipa
- * Club domestic league appearances and goals

Nasrollah Abdollahi (Persian: نصرالله عبداللهی, born 2 September 1951 in Tehran, Iran) is an Iranian football coach and former player.

== Playing career ==
=== Club career ===
Abdollahi played for Guard F.C. before he changed to Taj SC. There he could win the Iranian league in 1971 as well as the second place in 1974. Also he won AFC Champions League 1970 with Taj SC. in 1970

After playing for Rah Ahan F.C. for two years he joined Shahbaz F.C., where he played many successful years reaching the third place in the Iranian league in 1976/77 and winning the Tehran Cup in 1981.

=== International career ===
Abdollahi participated in 1976 Olympics in Montreal, when Iran reached the quarterfinals. He also played all three matches of Team Melli at the 1978 World Cup. Abdollahi was capped 39 times for the Iranian national team between 1976 and 1980; he won the 1976 Asian Cup in Iran and captained the team to third place in the 1980 Asian Cup in Kuwait.

== Coaching career ==
For a brief period during Nasser Hejazi's time as Esteghlal F.C. manager, Abdollahi was the assistant manager.
