= Bahram Mavaddat =

Iranian footballer

Personal information
- Full name: Bahram Mavaddat
- Date of birth: January 30, 1950 (age 76)
- Place of birth: Tehran, Iran
- Position: Goalkeeper

Senior career*
Years	Team	Apps	(Gls)
1965–1970	Shahin F.C.		
1970–1973	Paykan F.C.		
1973–1976	Persepolis F.C.		
1976–1978	Sepahan F.C.		

International career
1973–1978	Iran	10	(0)
- * Club domestic league appearances and goals

Bahram Mavaddat (Persian: بهرام مودت; born 30 January 1950) is a retired Iranian football player.

== Club career ==
Mavaddat started his professional career for Shahin F.C. After playing for Paykan F.C., he changed to Persepolis F.C., where he won the Iranian championships in 1974 and in 1976 and reach the runner-up position in 1975.

In 1976, he changed to Sepahan F.C., where he played his two last seasons before retiring.

== International career ==
He played for the Iran national football team and was the second-choice Goal Keeper at the 1978 FIFA World Cup.

== After retirement from football ==
Mavaddat joined the People's Mujahedin of Iran, an opposition political party after the Iranian Revolution together with Hassan Nayebagha and now is one of the members of the National Council of Resistance of Iran.
