= Hamid Jasemian =

Iranian footballer (1936–2021)

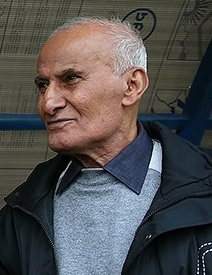

Personal information
- Date of birth: 25 August 1936
- Place of birth: Abadan, Iran
- Date of death: 25 April 2021 (aged 84)
- Place of death: Tehran, Iran
- Position: Defender

Youth career
- Shahin

Senior career*
Years	Team	Apps	(Gls)
1955–1960	Shahin Ahvaz		
1960–1966	Shahin		
1967–1969	Persepolis		

International career
1963–1966	Iran	10	(0)
- * Club domestic league appearances and goals

Hamid Jasemian (Persian: حمید جاسمیان; 25 August 1936 – 25 April 2021) was an Iranian footballer.

== Biography ==
He played as a central defender for Shahin Abadan, Shahin F.C. and Persepolis. When he played in Abadan, he denied an offer from Taj and joined Shahin. He was Persepolis' first ever captain. He died from COVID-19 on 25 April 2021.
