= Ali Jabbari =

Iranian footballer

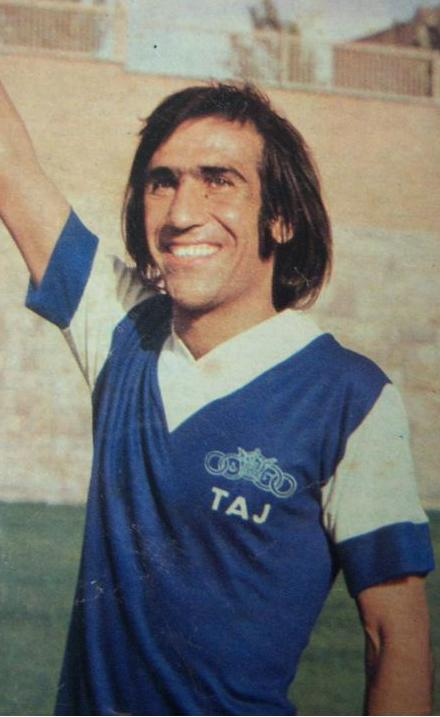

Personal information
- Full name: Ali Jabbari
- Date of birth: 20 July 1946 (age 80)
- Place of birth: Tehran, Iran
- Height: 1.77 m (5 ft 9 1/2 in)
- Position: Midfielder

Senior career*
| Years | Team | Apps | (Gls) |
| 1963–1965 | Rahahan | | |
| 1965–1975 | Taj | 173 | (89) |

International career
| 1965–1974 | Iran | 37 | (13) |
Medal record
Representing Iran
AFC Asian Cup
| Winner | 1968 |
| Winner | 1972 |
Asian Games
| Gold medal – first place | 1974 |
- * Club domestic league appearances and goals

Ali Jabbari is an Iranian former football midfielder who played for Iran in the 1972 Summer Olympics. He also played for Taj SC. One of the Best Iranian and Asian players of all Time.

== Club career ==
Jabbari began his club career with Rahahan, where he played for around three years. His performances for the team eventually got him a move to one of the biggest clubs, which was Taj.

In 1965, Jabbari transferred to Taj Tehran, where he would stay for the remainder of his playing career. He spent more than a decade at the club and became one of its most influential players during the late 1960s and early 1970s. Jabbari played a central role in Taj’s domestic success, helping the club win multiple Tehran League titles, including championships in 1969, 1971, and 1972.

In 1970, Jabbari helped the team win the 1970 Asian Club Championship. With Jabbari played a key role throughout the tournament.

== International career ==
Jabbari was a member of the Iran national football team during the late 1960s and early 1970s, and is regarded as one of the greatest players of Iran’s golden generation throughout the period.

Jabbari made his debut for the national team in the 1965 RCD Cup, in his debut match, he scored a goal against Pakistan. The following year, he participated in the 1966 Asian Games, also being included in the final. He also featured in the 1968 Asian Cup, helping Iran win the final against Burma. As well as participating with the national team in the 1969 Friendship Cup and the 1970 RCD Cup.

In 1972, He achieved an astonishing record for the fastest hat-trick in AFC Asian Cup history, by scoring a hat-trick in an eight-minute span late in the match to help Iran come-back from two goals down and defeat host nation Thailand. This feat occurred during the 1972 AFC Asian Cup in Bangkok, Jabbari also scored in the final, helping Iran successfully defended its title and won the trophy for the second consecutive time.

Jabbari also represented Iran at the 1972 Summer Olympics in Munich, appearing in the football tournament as part of the national squad.

In 1974, Jabbari was selected to play for Iran at the 1974 Asian Games. Where he scored a goal against Pakistan in a 7 to nil win in the group stages.

== Record at Olympic Games ==
| National team | Year | Apps | Goals |
|---|---|---|---|
| Iran | 1972 | 1 | 0 |

== Honours ==
=== Iran ===
- AFC Asian Cup
  - Winners (2): 1968, 1972
- Asian Games
  - Winners (1): 1974
  - Runners-up (1): 1966

=== Taj ===
- Asian Champion Club Tournament
  - Winners (1): 1970
  - Third place (1): 1971
- Iranian Football League
  - Winners (2): 1970–71, 1974–75
  - Runners-up (1): 1973–74
- Tehran Football League
  - Winners (3): 1969, 1970–71, 1972–73

=== Individual ===
- Golden Elite of the Asian Football Federation: 2013
- The AFC Asian Player of the Year award was introduced after her playing career; however, she is widely regarded as one of the most outstanding Asian footballers of her era and is frequently cited among the continent’s all-time greats.
