= Ahmed Fathi Hammadi =

Iraqi association football player

Personal information
- Full name: Ahmed Fathi Hammadi
- Date of birth: 24 August 1949
- Place of birth: Iraq
- Date of death: 7 June 2014 (aged 64)
- Position: Forward

Senior career*
Years	Team	Apps	(Gls)
- Al-Moshah
- Al-Maslaha
- Al-Baladiyat

International career
1972–1973	Iraq		
- * Club domestic league appearances and goals

Ahmed Fathi (24 August 1949 – 7 June 2014) was an Iraqi football forward who played for Iraq in the 1972 AFC Asian Cup.

He played for the national team between 1972 and 1973.
