= Aziz Asli =

Iranian footballer (1938–2015)

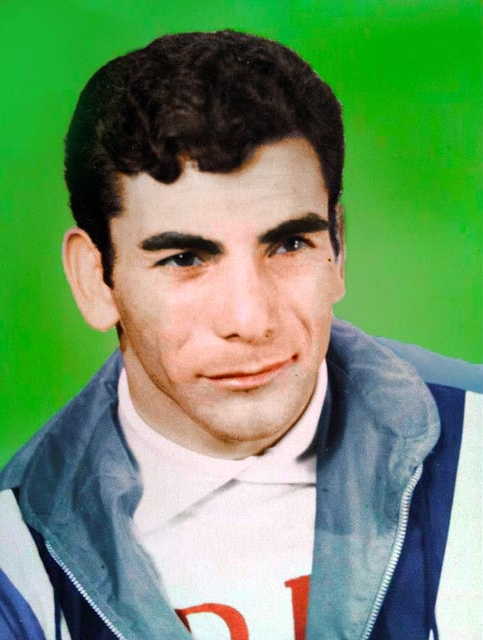

Personal information
- Full name: Aziz Aslimanesh
- Date of birth: 9 April 1938
- Place of birth: Tabriz, Iran
- Date of death: 23 April 2015 (aged 77)
- Place of death: Düsseldorf, Germany
- Height: 1.78 m (5 ft 10 in)
- Position: Goalkeeper

Youth career
- 1958–1960: Shahin

Senior career*
Years	Team	Apps	(Gls)
1960–1963	Daraei	67	(0)
1963–1968	Shahin	58	(0)
1968–1972	Persepolis	103	(0)
Total		228	(0)

International career
1962–1968	Iran	24	(0)
- * Club domestic league appearances and goals

Aziz Aslimanesh (Persian: عزیز اصلی; 9 April 1938 – 23 April 2015) was an Iranian football goalkeeper, manager and actor. He played for Daraei F.C. and then joined Persepolis F.C. for the rest of his career. He also capped for Team Melli, where he was part of the team that won the Asian Cup in 1968.

He acted in many films in Iran before the Iranian Islamic Revolution, including Conquerors of the Desert (1971), Keshtye Noah (1968) and Never Without Love (1966).

== Honours ==
=== Club ===
Daraei

- Tehran Football Championship: 1961–1962, 1962–63

Shahin

- Tehran Football Championship: 1965–66

=== International ===
Iran

- AFC Asian Cup: 1968
