= Hadi Tavoosi =

Iranian footballer and administrator

Personal information
- Date of birth: October 7, 1938 (age 88)
- Place of birth: Tehran, Iran
- Position: Goalkeeper

Youth career
- 1952–1954: Shahin

Senior career*
Years	Team	Apps	(Gls)
1954–1968	Shahin	180	(0)
1968–1974	Persepolis	56	(0)
1969–1970	→ Paykan (loan)	11	(0)
- * Club domestic league appearances and goals

Hadi Tavoosi (هادی طاووسی in Persian, born 7 October 1938 in Tehran, Iran) is a retired Iranian footballer and administrator. He was a goalkeeper and has played most of his playing careers in Shahin and Persepolis. He was also played one season at Paykan on loan. He was retired in 1974 and became a vice president at Iranian Football Federation. After resignation of Naser Noamooz in 1980, Tavoosi was appointed as president of the football federation. He was president of Iranian FA from 6 October 1980 until 8 August 1981.

== Honours ==
Shahin

- Tehran Football League
  - Winner (2): 1958–59, 1965–66
  - Runner-Up (4): 1957–58, 1959–60, 1961–62, 1962–63
- Tehran Hazfi Cup
  - Winner (1): 1962–63
  - Runners-Up (2): 1956–57, 1957–58

Persepolis

- Iranian Football League
  - Winners (2): 1971–72, 1973–74

Paykan

- Tehran Football League
  - Winner (1): 1969–70

Civic offices
Preceded by Nasser Noamoz	President of IRIFF; 1980–1981	Succeeded by Hossein Abshenasan
