= Morteza Fonounizadeh =

Iranian football former player

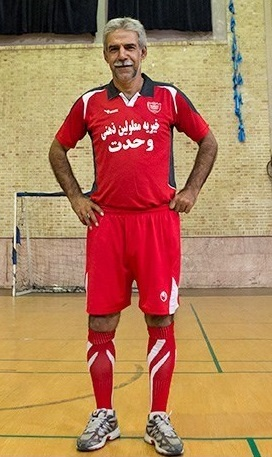

Personal information
- Full name: Morteza Fonounizadeh
- Date of birth: January 23, 1961 (age 65)
- Place of birth: Tehran, Iran
- Position: Defender

Youth career
- Rah Ahan

Senior career*
Years	Team	Apps	(Gls)
1980–1985	Shahin		
1985–1992	Persepolis		
1992–1994	Poora		

International career
1986–1990	Iran	16	(0)
- * Club domestic league appearances and goals

Morteza Fonounizadeh (Persian: مرتضي فنونی زاده, born 23 February 1961 in Tehran, Iran) is an Iranian football former player.

== Honours ==
=== Iran ===
- AFC Asian Cup
  - 1984, Fourth Place
  - 1988, Third Place
- Asian Games
  - 1986 Asian Games Quarter Final

=== Persepolis FC ===
- Asian Cup Winners' Cup
  - 1990–91 Champions
- Qods League
  - 1989–1990 Runner-up
- Hazfi Cup
  - 1987 Champions
  - 1991–1992 Champions
- Tehran provincial league
  - 1986 Champions
  - 1987 Champions
  - 1988 Champions
  - 1989 Champions
  - 1990 Champions
  - 1991 Runner-up

=== Shahin ===
- Tehran provincial league
  - 1984 Champions
  - 1985 Runner-up
