= Itzhak Marili =

Israeli footballer

Itzhak Marili יצחק מרילי
Personal information
- Date of birth: 12 May 1945 (age 81)
- Place of birth: Jerusalem, Israel
- Position: Defender

Youth career
- Hapoel Jerusalem

Senior career*
Years	Team	Apps	(Gls)
1966–1975	Hapoel Jerusalem		

International career
1968	Israel	2	(0)
- * Club domestic league appearances and goals

Itzhak Marili (Hebrew: יצחק מרילי; born 12 May 1945) is an Israeli former footballer.

His younger brother is Zion Merili also a former footballer.

== Career ==
Marili began playing football for the Hapoel Jerusalem's youth team. In 1966 he signed with the senior team and played there a decade.

He took a part in the 1968 AFC Asian Cup.

== Honours ==
Hapoel Jerusalem

- Israel State Cup: 1972–73
