= Mahmoud Khordbin =

Iranian retired football player (born 1948)

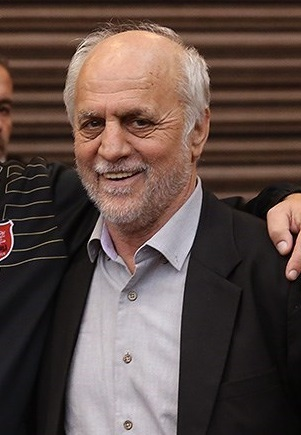
- Khordbin in 2015

Personal information
- Date of birth: 24 September 1948 (age 78)
- Place of birth: Tehran, Iran
- Position: Striker

Team information
- Current team: Persepolis (vice president)

Youth career
- 1963–1964: Bank Melli

Senior career*
Years	Team	Apps	(Gls)
1969–1980	Persepolis	170	(47)
1970	→ Taj (auxiliary)		

International career
1972	Iran	2	(0)

Managerial career
- 1993: Persepolis (caretaker)
- * Club domestic league appearances and goals

Mahmoud Khordbin (Persian: محمود خوردبین, born 24 September 1948 in Tehran, Iran) is an Iranian retired football player. He was team manager of Persepolis from 1980 until 2017. He is currently club's deputy chairman.

== Club career ==

Khordbin spent his entire career at Persepolis. He was member of Persepolis from 1964 to 1980. He also was an auxiliary player for Taj in 1970 Asian Champion Club Tournament.

== International career ==
He has two national caps for Team melli.

== After retirement ==
=== Management ===
He managed Persepolis F.C. for 7 games in 1993.

=== Directorship ===
After he retired, he became director of Persepolis football team. He was replaced by Ebrahim Ashtiani in 2003–2004. Khordbin Returned to his job a season later. After being replaced by Mohsen Eskandarin in 2006–2007, He was returned to Persepolis as director another time by the club in 2007–08 season and then was selected as club's vice president. On 13 September 2014, he returned to Persepolis, again as team manager.
