= Mehrab Shahrokhi =

Iranian footballer

Personal information
- Full name: Mehrab Shahrokhi
- Date of birth: February 2, 1944
- Place of birth: Sar Bandar, Imperial State of Iran
- Date of death: February 1, 1993 (aged 48)
- Place of death: Tehran, Iran
- Height: 1.85 m (6 ft 1 in)
- Position: Defender

Youth career
- 1960–1962: Shenaye Ahvaz

Senior career*
Years	Team	Apps	(Gls)
1962–1963	Shenaye Ahvaz	21	(3)
1963–1966	Shahin	53	(7)
1966–1967	Daraei	25	(0)
1967–1970	Paykan	68	(5)
1970–1975	Persepolis	107	(9)
1975–1976	Shahbaz	20	(2)

International career
1963–1969	Iran	15	(1)

Managerial career
- 1977–1982: Persepolis
- * Club domestic league appearances and goals

Mehrab Shahrokhi (Persian: مهراب شاهرخی; February 2, 1944 – February 1, 1993) was an Iranian footballer. He was an Afro-Iranian from Khuzestan Province. He was nicknamed The Black Bomber (Persian: بمب افکن سیاه) because of his style of play and dark skin and his strong kicks.

== Club career ==
Shahrokhi began his football career in his birthplace, Ahvaz, playing for Shenaye Ahvaz Club. In 1963 he moved to Tehran and began playing for Shahin F.C. Shahrokhi left for Daraei F.C. in 1966, after problems with Shahin's management. His spell at Darei was short-lived, moving first to Paykan F.C. and then to Persepolis F.C. There he could win the Iranian championship in 1972 and 1974.

He continued playing with Persepolis until 1974 and retired from football in 1975.

== International career ==
While still in Ahvaz, in 1963 Shahrokhi was invited to join the Iranian national football team. He was to participate in the football tournament of the 1964 Summer Olympics, but he missed out after boycotting the team along with a number of other Shahin players. They refused to accompany the national team because the national team director — a fan of Shahin's rival, Daraei F.C. — had decided to drop several Shahin players from the squad in favor of Daraei players. A number of players including Shahrokhi were banned from any involvement in football for one year.

In 1968, he won with the national team its first major title, the Asian Cup in Iran.

== Retirement ==
In 1976 came Shahrokhi's debut in Iranian cinema, acting in a movie called Alafhaye Harz. Acting was not his passion though, and he became the manager of several teams after retirement, but was not able to achieve anything impressive, as the Iranian Revolution and Iran–Iraq War caused football's presence to diminish in 1980s Iran.

== Death ==
Shahrokhi died on February 1, 1993.
