= Nima Nakisa =

Iranian footballer and singer

Nima Nakissa
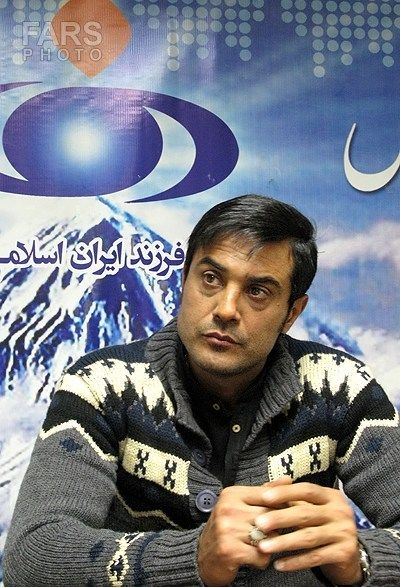

Personal information
- Full name: Nima Nakissa
- Date of birth: May 1, 1975 (age 51)
- Place of birth: Tehran, Iran
- Height: 1.85 m (6 ft 1 in)
- Position: Goalkeeper

Team information
- Current team: Zob Ahan (Executive Director)

Senior career*
Years	Team	Apps	(Gls)
1994–1996	Persepolis		
1996–1997	Payam Khorasan		
1997–1999	Persepolis		
1999	Flamurtari Vlorë		
1999–2000	Kavalas		
2000–2002	Bargh Shiraz		
2002–2006	Pas		
2006–2007	Esteghlal Jonoub		
2007	Esteghlal Ahvaz		

International career^{‡}
1996–1998	Iran	13	(0)
- * Club domestic league appearances and goals as of 30 July 2007 ‡ National team caps and goals as of 30 July 2007

Nima Nakisa (Persian: نیما نکیسا; born May 1, 1975, in Tehran) is an Iranian football executive and former football goalkeeper, who is currently the executive director of Zob Ahan sport club.

== Club career ==
Nakisa first entered the limelight in Iranian football when he played for Persepolis FC. Following World Cup 1998, Nakisa was transferred to Albanian Side KS Flamurtari Vlorë, but left very soon after to AO Kavalas. He had a tough time there, and moved back to Iran the season after. He went back to Persepolis but due to his rivalry with Abedzadeh, Nakisa decided to leave the club for Pas Tehran. He played there until August 2006, when he quit after having an argument with Pas Tehran officials. There was speculation linking him to Esteghlal Ahvaz, but after the signing of Ebrahim Mirzapour, Nakisa was no longer needed. Due to this he missed the IPL transfer deadline and was forced to sign with a lower league team, on September 4, 2006, it was announced that Nima Nakisa had officially signed a one-year contract with Azadegan League outfit Esteghlal Jonub Dezful.

On July 23, 2007, Nakisa signed with IPL club Esteghlal Ahvaz F.C., the club he was destined to sign with for the 2006/07 season on a one-year deal, however in his first game he had to be subbed out due to injury. His injury has set him back and is thought he will never be able to play again.

Nima Nakisa officially retired from professional football shortly after to pursue a singing career.

== International career ==
Nakisa made his first appearance for the Iranian national team in a friendly versus Lebanon on November 13, 1996. Nakisa was playing for Persepolis FC at the time. Because of an injury to Iran's number one goalkeeper, Ahmadreza Abedzadeh, Nakisa started all of Iran's games in Asia Cup 1996, performing quite well despite his lack of experience. He was called up again to the national team for World Cup 1998. Once again Abedzadeh was injured and Nakisa started in his place for the first game versus Yugoslavia national football team. Nakisa was extremely nervous, and his mistake allowed Siniša Mihajlović to score on a free kick. Iran lost the game 1–0. Nakisa did not start the other two games and his only other international appearances after that were at the Thailand Asian Games in 1998. He was called up to the national team again by Iran's next manager Branko Ivanković, but did not play.

== Honours ==
=== Club ===
Persepolis

- Iranian Football League: 1995–96

Pas

- Iranian Football League: 2003–04

=== National ===
Iran

- Asian Games Gold Medal: 1998

== Personal life ==
Nakisa has a background in music. He is able to play the piano, and also released a music album in 2005.
