= Hamid Majd Teymouri =

Iranian footballer

Personal information
- Full name: Hamid Majd Teymouri
- Date of birth: June 3, 1953 (age 73)
- Place of birth: Iran
- Position: Forward

Senior career*
Years	Team	Apps	(Gls)
?–1977	Bank Melli		
1977–1985	Shahbaz		

International career
1978	Iran	1	(0)
- * Club domestic league appearances and goals

Hamid Majd Teymouri is a retired Iranian football player.

== Club career ==
He played for Shahbaz F.C./Shahin F.C. many years winning the Tehran Cup in 1981.

== International career ==
He played for the Iran national football team in one game (to Yugoslavia in April 1978) and participated at the 1978 FIFA World Cup as a member of the squad.
