= Hossein Kalani =

Iranian footballer

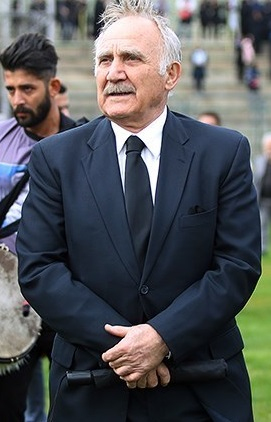

Personal information
- Full name: Hossein Kalani
- Date of birth: January 23, 1945 (age 81)
- Place of birth: Tehran, Iran
- Height: 1.78 m (5 ft 10 in)
- Position: Striker

Youth career
- 1960–1965: Shahin

Senior career*
Years	Team	Apps	(Gls)
1965–1968	Shahin		
1968–1969	Persepolis		
1969–1970	Paykan		
1970–1975	Persepolis		
1975–1976	Shahbaz		

International career
1967–1973	Iran	24	(11)
- * Club domestic league appearances and goals

Hossein Kalani (Persian: حسین کلانی; born January 23, 1945, in Tehran) is a retired Iranian football striker who played for Shahin, Persepolis, Paykan Tehran, Shahbaz and the Iran national football team. He was named as one of the members of Persepolis F.C. Hall of Fame and the club thanked him for his great performance during his senior career at Persepolis. The club presented him with a bust of his likeness and named him as one of the twelve great players of Persepolis in the 1970s.

== Early life ==
Kalani was born in the city of Khorramabad, but spent his childhood and adolescence in Tehran. He developed an interest in football at an early age, playing with friends on the clay pitches of southern Tehran.

== Club career ==
In 1965, Kalani was promoted to the first team of Shahin by Abbas Ekrami, due to his impressive performances in the youth side. However, Kalani faced an injury which sidelined him for two years, During this time, Kalani played with legendary strikers such as Homayoun Behzadi and Hamid Shirzadegan.

In 1968, Kalani joined Persepolis, where he would go on to cement his legacy as one of the best players to ever play for the club. Kalani also played for clubs such as Paykan, another stint at Persepolis, and lastly Shahbaz.

== International career ==
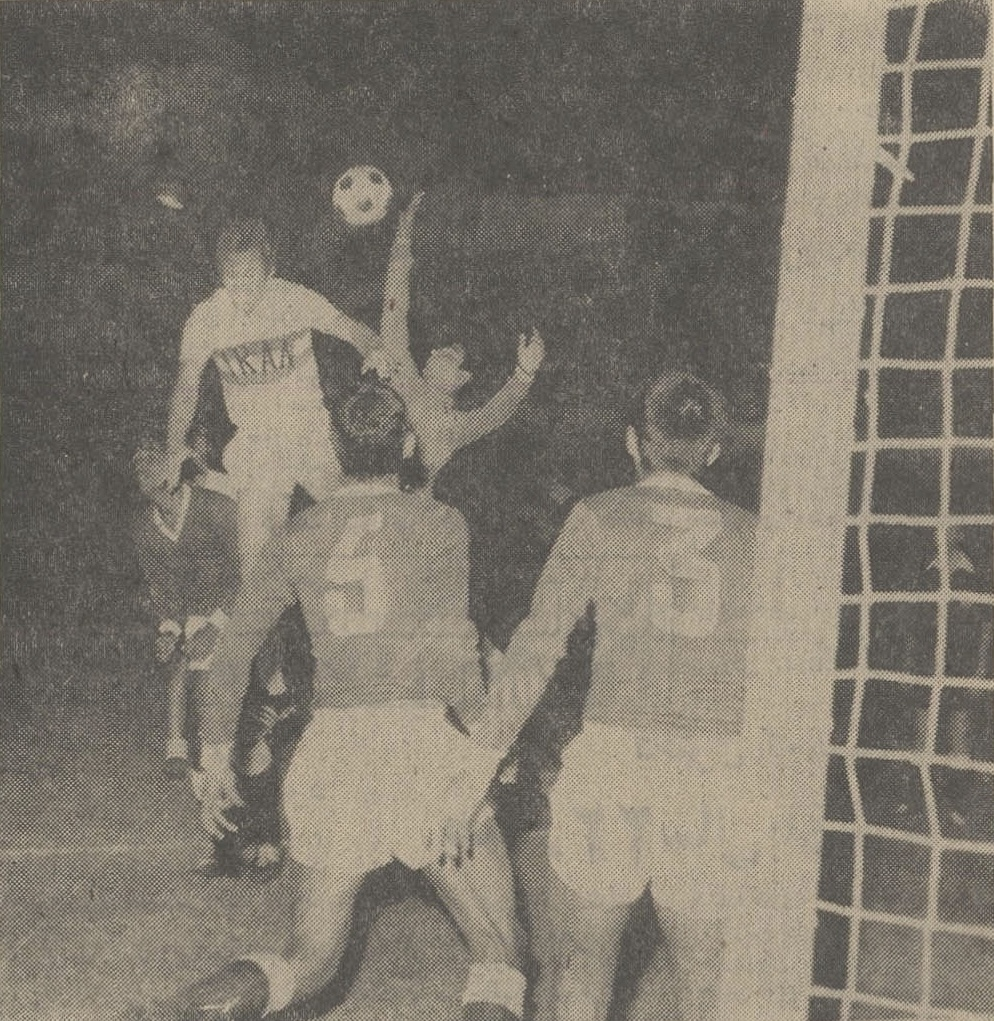
Hossein Kalani scoring the fourth goal of Iran against Pakistan the 1970 RCD Cup.

In 1967, Kalani was called up to the Iran national football team for the 1967 RCD Cup. Where he made his debut against Pakistan. The next year, Kalani participated with the national squad for the 1968 Asian Cup, where he was also included into the final.

In 1969, Kalani was present with the national team for their participation in the 1969 RCD Cup. In the tournament, he scored a brace against Pakistan. He also played in the 1970 RCD Cup, where he scored in a seven to nil win against Pakistan.

In 1972, Kalani notably scored a hat-trick against arch-rivals Iraq in the group stages of the 1972 AFC Asian Cup, as well as scoring a goal in the 1972 Asian Cup final against South Korea.
