= Mohammad Reza Khalatbari (footballer, born 1948) =

Iranian footballer and coach

Personal information
- Full name: Mohammad Reza Khalatbari
- Date of birth: 22 March 1948
- Place of birth: Āsīāb Sar, Ramsar, Iran
- Date of death: 17 September 2016 (aged 68)
- Place of death: Ramsar, Iran
- Positions: Central midfielder; left winger

Youth career
- 1964–1965: Shahin
- 1965: → Jam Abadan
- 1965–1966: Bank Melli
- 1966–1969: Guard

Senior career*
Years	Team	Apps	(Gls)
1969–1971	Nirou Zamini		
1971–1979	Persepolis		
1978–1979	→ Ekbatan (loan)		
1980–1983	Ekbatan		

International career
1966–1968	Iran U20		

Managerial career
- Ekbatan
- Persepolis Rāmsar
- Shahrdāri Tonkabon
- Shahrdāri Abbasabad
- Atiesāzān Rāmsar
- * Club domestic league appearances and goals

Mohammad Reza Khalatbari (Persian: محمدرضا خلعتبری, March 22, 1948 – September 17, 2016) was an Iranian association footballer and coach.

During his 16 years as a professional football player, he never was given a yellow or red card.

Iranian international footballer, Mohammad Reza Khalatbari, is one of his distant relatives.
