= Behrouz Soltani =

Iranian footballer

Personal information
- Full name: Behrouz Soltani
- Date of birth: December 31, 1957 (age 68)
- Place of birth: Tehran, Iran
- Position: Goalkeeper

Senior career*
Years	Team	Apps	(Gls)
- Kian
1981–1989	Persepolis		
- Daraei F.C.

International career
1981–1989	Iran	17	(0)
- * Club domestic league appearances and goals

Behrouz Soltani (Persian: بهروز سلطانی) born December 31, 1957, in Tehran, Iran, is a retired Iranian goalkeeper. He competed in the football tournament of the Asian Games in Delhi in 1982 as well as in the Asian Cup 1984 in Singapore.

Soltani is said to be one of the best goalkeepers of the history of the Iranian football after the Islamic Revolution in 1979.
