= 1977–78 Takht Jamshid Cup =

Takht Jamshid Cup
- Season: 1977–78
- Champions: PAS Tehran
- Relegated: Sepahan; Rah Ahan
- Matches: 240
- Goals: 434 (1.81 per match)
- Top goalscorer: Aziz Espandar (16)

The 1977–78 season was the fifth season of the Takht Jamshid Cup of Iranian football. The competition was won by PAS Football Club of Tehran.

== Results ==
Pos	Team	Pld	W	D	L	GF	GA	GD	Pts	Relegation (Note: Table errors: 156 total wins != 157 total losses, 167 total draws is an odd number, and 434 total for != 433 total against)
1	PAS Tehran (C)	30	15	10	5	32	21	+11	40	
2	Persepolis	30	14	10	6	45	27	+18	38	
3	Malavan	30	13	11	6	35	22	+13	37	
4	Taj	30	14	7	9	32	22	+10	35	
5	Tractor Sazi	30	12	10	8	30	22	+8	34	
6	Sanat Naft Abadan	30	12	10	8	28	26	+2	34	
7	Bargh Shiraz	30	10	13	7	26	20	+6	33	
8	Zob Ahan	30	11	10	9	31	30	+1	32	
9	Niroo Ahvaz	30	10	11	9	22	20	+2	31	
10	Machine Sazi	30	9	10	11	20	23	−3	28	
11	Shahbaz	30	7	13	10	31	29	+2	27	
12	Homa F.C.	30	9	9	12	24	28	−4	27	
13	Sepahan (R)	30	7	12	11	21	31	−10	26	Relegated to 2nd Division
14	Bank Melli	30	6	12	12	17	26	−9	24	
15	Daraei F.C.	30	6	10	14	26	38	−12	22	
16	Rah Ahan (R)	30	1	9	20	14	48	−34	11	Relegated to 2nd Division

(C) Champions; (R) Relegated

== Top goalscorers ==
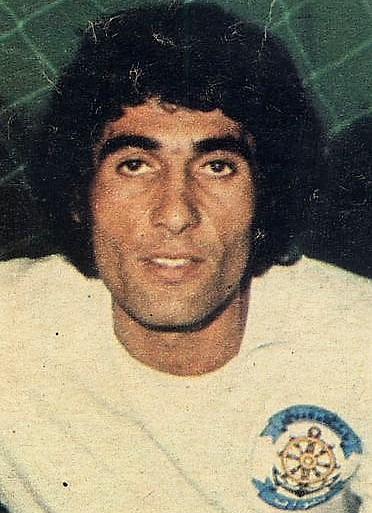
Aziz Espandar

Pos	Scorer	Goals	Team
1st	(Iran) Aziz Espandar	16	Malavan
2nd	(Iran) Hossein Faraki	11	PAS
3rd	(Iran) Mohammad Reza Adelkhani	10	Shahbaz
3rd	(Iran) Hossein Fadakar	10	Daraei
	(Iran) Parviz Mazloomi	9	Teraktor Sazi Tabriz
	(Iran) Hassan Rowshan	9	Taj
	(England) Alan Whittle	9	Persepolis
