= Jafar Kashani =

Iranian footballer (1944–2019)

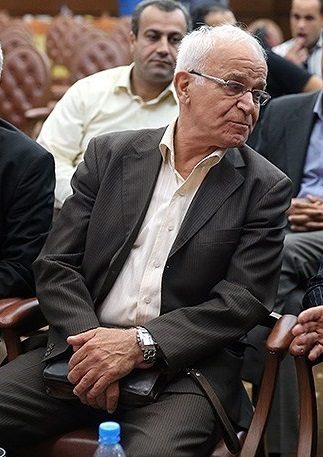

Personal information
- Full name: Jafar Ashraf Kashani
- Date of birth: 21 March 1944
- Place of birth: Tehran, Imperial Iran
- Date of death: 2 October 2019 (aged 75)
- Place of death: Tehran, Iran
- Height: 1.75 m (5 ft 9 in)
- Position: Defender

Youth career
- 1960–1965: Shahin

Senior career*
Years	Team	Apps	(Gls)
1964–1967	Shahin	43	(2)
1967–1975	Persepolis	176	(9)
Total		219	(11)

International career
1968–1974	Iran	38	(0)
- * Club domestic league appearances and goals

Jafar Ashraf Kashani (Persian: جعفر اشرف کاشانی; March 21, 1944 – October 2, 2019) was an Iranian football player. He was scouted by Abbas Ekrami, Shahin F.C.'s founder when he was 16. After Shahin's dissolution, he joined Persepolis F.C. and played until 1974 when he was captain. Then he was employed by Ministry of Foreign Affairs and worked in embassies in Germany and UAE. He was also a member of board of directors at IRIFF and Persepolis. He died on 2 October 2019 due to a heart attack. He was board secretary of Persepolis at the time of his death.
