= Gholamhossein Farzami =

Iranian footballer (1945–2025)

Personal information
- Date of birth: 11 July 1945
- Place of birth: Tehran, Iran
- Date of death: 19 February 2025 (aged 79)
- Position: Midfielder
	Taj		(21)

International career
Years	Team	Apps	(Gls)
1966–1968	Iran	8	(1)

Managerial career
- San'ati Behshahr Rey

Gholamhossein Farzami (Persian: غلامحسین فرزامی; 11 July 1945 – 19 February 2025) was an Iranian footballer who played as a midfielder. He is regarded as a "pioneer of Iranian football".

Along with Taj, he became the runner-up in the qualifying tournament of the Asian Club Cup.

Farzami died on 19 February 2025, at the age of 79.
