= Hamid Shirzadegan =

Iranian footballer

Hamid Shirzadegan حمید شیرزادگان
Personal information
- Full name: Hamid Shirzadegan
- Date of birth: March 8, 1941
- Place of birth: Tehran, Iran
- Date of death: September 28, 2007 (age 66)
- Place of death: Tehran, Iran
- Height: 1.77 m (5 ft 9 1/2 in)
- Position: Striker

Youth career
- –1957: Shahin F.C.

Senior career*
Years	Team	Apps	(Gls)
1957–1965	Shahin F.C.		
1965–1966	Baltimore Kickers		
1966–1967	Shahin F.C.		
1968–1974	Persepolis F.C.		

International career
1959–1966	Iran	14	(9)

Managerial career
- Naft Tehran F.C.
- * Club domestic league appearances and goals

Hamid Shirzadegan (8 March 1941 – 28 September 2007) was an Iranian football player. During his career, he was nicknamed Paa Talaaee (Golden Feet).

== Club career ==
Shirzadegan started out at Shahin FC youth teams and in 1957 at the age of just 16 was selected for the senior team. He moved to Persepolis FC after Shahin disbanded due to political issues. He was known for his powerful shots, as if it could rip the goal net.

== International career ==
Shirzadegan debuted for Iran on December 8, 1959 against India. He scored 9 goals in 14 games for Iran, thus giving him an excellent goal scoring rate.

== After retirement ==
In his last years of life, Shirzadegan's health deteriorated. He was diagnosed with a progressive form of lung cancer which resulted in his death in Tehran, Iran on September 28, 2007 at the age of 66.
