= 1972 AFC Asian Cup =

Asian Cup Thailand 1972 เอเชียนคัพ 2515

Tournament details
- Host country: Thailand
- Dates: 7–19 May
- Teams: 6
- Venue: 1 (in 1 host city)

Final positions
- Champions: Iran (2nd title)
- Runners-up: South Korea
- Third place: Thailand
- Fourth place: Khmer Republic

Tournament statistics
- Matches played: 13
- Goals scored: 38 (2.92 per match)
- Attendance: 155,000 (11,923 per match)
- Top scorer(s): (Iran) Hossein Kalani (5 goals)
- Best player: (Iran) Ebrahim Ashtiani

The 1972 AFC Asian Cup (Thai: เอเชียนคัพ 2515) was the fifth international association football championship for members of the Asian Football Confederation (AFC). Hosted by Thailand, the competition ran from 7 to 19 May 1972 and was contested by the national teams of Iran, Iraq, the Khmer Republic, Kuwait, South Korea and Thailand.

Originally, the competition was due to be hosted by Israel but they withdrew as hosts as a result of geopolitical issues and hostility towards the country from Arab nations stemming from the 1967 Arab–Israeli war.

This was the first edition which was not played as a round-robin tournament and instead featured a group stage before two semi-finals and a final. The final was contested by defending champions Iran and South Korea. Following a 1–1 draw in regulation time, Hossein Kalani scored the only goal of extra time as Iran won the competition for the second time.

== Background ==
The inaugural AFC Asian Cup was held in Hong Kong in 1956. Iran were the defending champions after winning all four of their matches in the previous round-robin tournament in 1968. South Korea were the most successful team in the history of the competition, having won the title twice previously.

Originally, the hosting rights for the competition were awarded to Israel. However, tensions between Arab nations and Israel had been growing, particularly following the 1967 Arab–Israeli war. As a result of geopolitical issues and hostility towards Israel from Arab nations which stemmed from the conflict, Israel withdrew from the competition and withdrew as the host nation. Thailand subsequently stepped in to host the tournament at short notice.

== Qualification ==
Originally, Israel qualified automatically as hosts and Iran qualified automatically as defending champions. In total, 24 teams were included in the qualifying draw but 11 would withdraw without playing a match.

Teams were split geographically into an eastern, western and central zone. South Korea qualified by default after the other teams in the eastern zone withdrew. Thailand and the Khmer Republic qualified as winners and runners-up respectively of the central zone and Iraq and the Kuwait qualified as winners and runners-up of the western zone respectively.

The tournament was scheduled to go ahead with eight teams originally but, after Israel withdrew and only one team qualified from the eastern zone, it went ahead with only six teams.

=== Participants ===
Nations qualified for the 1972 AFC Asian Cup
Team	Qualified as	Qualified on	Previous appearances
~~Israel~~	~~Hosts~~	N/A	4 (1956, 1960, 1964, 1968)
Thailand	Central Zone winners	30 May 1971	0 (debut)
Iran	1968 AFC Asian Cup champions	19 May 1968	1 (1968)
Khmer Republic	Central Zone runners-up	30 May 1971	0 (debut)
South Korea	Eastern zone winners	1971	3 (1956, 1960, 1964)
Iraq	Western Zone winners	22 December 1971	0 (debut)
Kuwait	Western Zone runners-up	21 December 1971	0 (debut)

== Format ==
All six teams played a preliminary match to decide which group they would enter. They would then contest two single round robin groups of three teams. The group winners and runners-up would contest the semi-finals which would decide the teams contesting the final and the third-place play-off.

== Venue ==
All matches were played at the National Stadium in Bangkok.

Bangkok is located in Thailand	Bangkok
Bangkok is located in Thailand	National Stadium
Bangkok is located in Thailand	Capacity: 26,000

== Group allocation matches ==
The winners of matches one and two (Iraq and Iran) were allocated to Group A alongside the loser of match three (Thailand). The remaining teams were allocated to Group B.

7 May 1972
19:00

South Korea	0–0	Iraq
Penalties
	2–4

National Stadium, Bangkok
Attendance: 3,000

7 May 1972
20:40

Iran	2–0	Khmer Republic
Kalani 45'; Iranpak 51'

National Stadium, Bangkok
Attendance: 3,000
Referee: Kim Jo-wong (South Korea)

8 May 1972
19:30

Thailand	0–2	Kuwait
		Khalaf 42'; Marzouq 85'

National Stadium, Bangkok
Attendance: 28,000

== Group stage ==
=== Group A ===
Iran and Thailand advanced to the semi-finals.

==== Table ====
Pos	Team	Pld	W	D	L	GF	GA	GD	Pts	Qualification
1	Iran	2	2	0	0	6	2	+4	4	Advance to semi-finals
2	Thailand	2	0	1	1	3	4	−1	1	Advance to semi-finals
3	Iraq	2	0	1	1	1	4	−3	1	

==== Matches ====
9 May 1972
19:30

Iran	3–0	Iraq
Kalani 34', 70', 78'

National Stadium, Bangkok
Attendance: 5,000
Referee: Sivapalan Kathiravale (Malaysia)

11 May 1972
19:30

Thailand	1–1	Iraq
Meelarpkit 57'		Fathi 6'

National Stadium, Bangkok
Attendance: 24,000

13 May 1972
19:30

Thailand	2–3	Iran
Tantariyanond 69', 71'		Jabbari 74', 77', 79'

National Stadium, Bangkok
Attendance: 25,000
Referee: Matolozi (Malaysia)

=== Group B ===
South Korea and the Khmer Republic advanced to the semi-finals.

==== Table ====
Pos	Team	Pld	W	D	L	GF	GA	GD	Pts	Qualification
1	South Korea	2	1	0	1	5	3	+2	2	Advance to semi-finals
2	Khmer Republic	2	1	0	1	5	4	+1	2	Advance to semi-finals
3	Kuwait	2	1	0	1	2	5	−3	2	

==== Matches ====
10 May 1972
19:30

South Korea	4–1	Khmer Republic
Park Su-deok 37'; Lee Hoi-taek 59'; Cha Bum-kun 69'; Park Lee-chun 78'		Sokhom 82'

National Stadium, Bangkok
Attendance: 7,000
Referee: Sobhi Adeeb (Iraq)

12 May 1972
19:30

South Korea	1–2	Kuwait
Park Lee-chun 2' (pen.)		Sultan 25'; Duraiham 73'

National Stadium, Bangkok
Attendance: 10,000

14 May 1972
19:30

Khmer Republic	4–0	Kuwait
Sokhom 23'; Sok Sun Hean 56'; Tes Sean 59'; Sea Cheng Eang 80'

National Stadium, Bangkok
Attendance: 1,000

== Semi-finals ==
Iran defeated the Khmer Republic and South Korea defeated Thailand on penalties to advance to the final.

16 May 1972
19:30

Iran	2–1	Khmer Republic
Iranpak 15'; Ghelichkhani 48'		Sokhom 18'

National Stadium, Bangkok
Attendance: 2,000
Referee: Matolozi (Malaysia)

17 May 1972
19:30

Thailand	1–1 (a.e.t.)	South Korea
Tantariyanond 98'		Park Lee-chun 105'
Penalties
	1–2

National Stadium, Bangkok
Attendance: 50,000

== Third-place play-off ==
After a 2–2 draw, Thailand defeated the Khmer Republic 5–3 on penalties to finish third.

19 May 1972
19:30

Thailand	2–2 (a.e.t.)	Khmer Republic
Tantariyanond 35'; Kitboon 68'		Miladord 64'; Samkol 84'
Penalties
	5–3

National Stadium, Bangkok
Attendance: 15,000

== Final ==
After a 1–1 draw, Hossein Kalani scored the only goal of extra time as Iran defeated South Korea to win the tournament.

19 May 1972
20:40

Iran	2–1 (a.e.t.)	South Korea
Jabbari 48'; Kalani 107'		Park Lee-chun 68'

National Stadium, Bangkok
Attendance: 15,000
Referee: Sivapalan Kathiravale (Malaysia)
