= Abbas Ekrami =

Iranian football manager

Dr. Abbas Ekrami (Persian: عباس اکرامی) (1915 – 5 February 2002) was a former Iranian football manager. He was the founder of one of Iran's most prestigious football clubs, Shahin.
