= Akbar Eftekhari =

Iranian footballer (1943–2017)

Personal information
- Full name: Akbar Eftekhari
- Date of birth: 7 December 1943
- Place of birth: Bandar Imam Khomeini, Iran
- Date of death: 9 November 2017 (aged 73)
- Place of death: Tehran, Iran
- Position: Striker

Senior career*
Years	Team	Apps	(Gls)
- Clony Khozestan
1962–1968	Daraei		
1968–1971	Taj SC		
- Oghab
- Persepolis

International career
1966–1972	Iran	11	(2)
- * Club domestic league appearances and goals

Akbar Eftekhari (Persian: اکبر افتخاری; b. 7 December 1943 – d. 9 November 2017) was an Iranian football midfielder who played for Iran. He also played for Taj SC and Persepolis.
