= Homayoun Behzadi =

Iranian footballer (1942–2016)

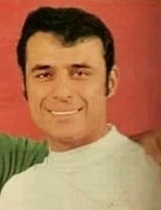
- Behzadi in 1974

Personal information
- Date of birth: 20 June 1942
- Place of birth: Khorramabad, Iran
- Date of death: 22 January 2016 (aged 73)
- Place of death: Tehran, Iran
- Height: 1.76 m (5 ft 9 in)
- Position: Striker

Youth career
- 1954–1958: Shahin

Senior career*
| Years | Team | Apps | (Gls) |
| 1958–1968 | Shahin | 168 | |
| 1968–1969 | Persepolis | 19 | |
| 1969–1970 | → Paykan | 155 | |
| 1970–1975 | Persepolis | 16 | |
| Total | | 375 | |

International career
| 1962–1974 | Iran | 35 | (11) |

Managerial career
- 1974–1976: Persepolis (assistant)
- 1975: Persepolis (interim)
- * Club domestic league appearances and goals

Homayoun Behzadi (Persian: همایون بهزادی; 20 June 1942 – 22 January 2016) was an Iranian footballer and coach. He usually played as a striker.

== Early life ==
Behzadi was born on 4 January 1942 in Khorramabad, Lorestan province. Behzadi joined the youth team of Shahin at the age of 12. He also graduated with a degree in the Persian language.

== Club career ==
=== Early career ===
In 1958, He first broke into the Shahin side when he was only 16 years old. He played for the club until 1968, when due to financial problems Shahin FC dissolved.

=== Persepolis and Paykan ===
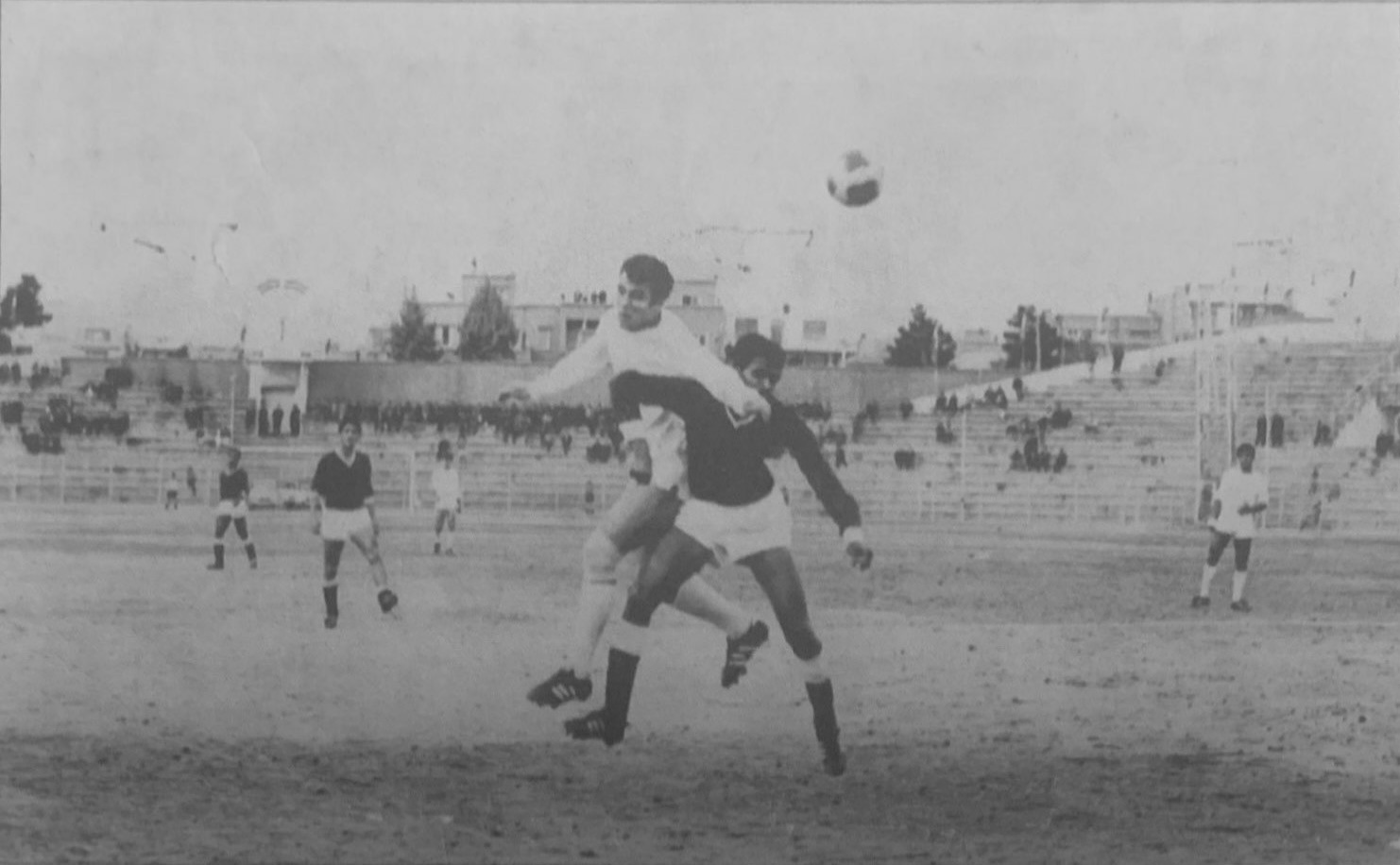
Behzadi and Zakaria Pintoo wrestling for the ball during a match between Paykan FC and Pakistan Football Federation XI in the 1970 Friendship Cup held in Tehran, Iran.

In 1968, After Shahin was dissolved, Behzadi joined Persepolis, featuring with the squad for 19 appearances. In spring 1969, he then joined Paykan on a loan deal, being an influential striker for the club, helping them win the Tehran Championship in 1969, also participating with the team in the 1970 Friendship Cup with them. Before to Persepolis in 1970. Before returning to Persepolis, contributing to the team's success as they won the Iranian league in 1972 as well as in 1974.

== International career ==
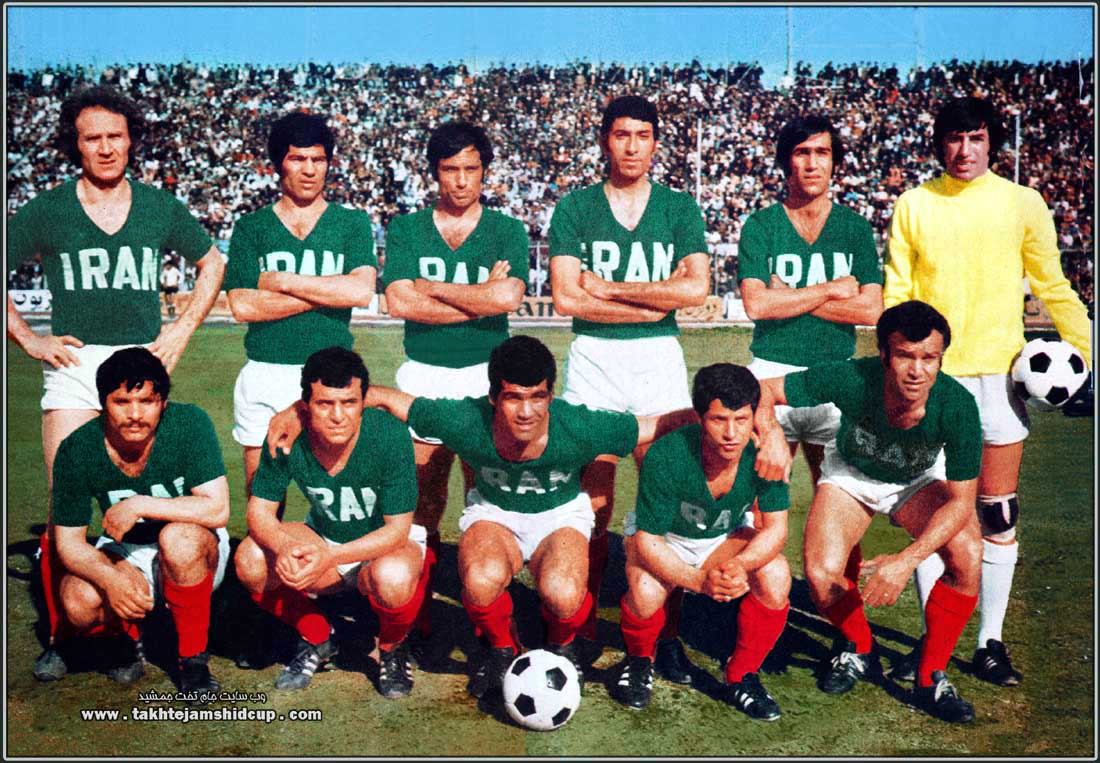
Behzadi sitting second from left with the Iran national team in 1972.

Behzadi was among the star players of the Iran national team. He played for the national team from 1962 till 1974, scoring 11 goals in 35 appearances.

In 1962, Behzadi made his debut for the Iran national football team in a friendly match against Iraq. The following year, he scored his first goal for the national team against Pakistan in the 1964 Summer Olympics qualification. Behzadi was also selected for the 1965 RCD Cup, Where he scored a brace against Pakistan, finishing as the joint top goal-scorer alongside Ogün Altıparmak.

In 1966, Behzadi was a part of the squad which won the silver medal at the 1966 Asian Games, held in Thailand. Two years later, he helped Iranwin the 1968 Asian Cup. In which, he scored four goals in four matches, also an equalizer in the final, which led to 2–1 victory against Israel, becoming the tournament's top scorer. He also featured with Iran for the 1972 Asian Cup which they also won.

== Coaching career ==
Before his starting his coaching career, he trained Persepolis in the absence of manager Alan Rogers, when he was part of the team. After he retired in 1975, he became caretaker head coach of the club after resignation of Rogers. He starts a project in Persepolis that held in next years to decrease the age of the first team squad. His first match as the Persepolis match was a friendly against Malavan which won 3–1. His first official match was a loss to Rah Ahan. After that, Persepolis won and drew twice, then faced to the rivals, Taj (now Esteghlal) in Tehran derby. He lost the match 3–1, but after the match he claimed that Taj players drugs before the match. It was later rejected. He was banned for two months and was replaced with Buyuk Vatankhah. After he was sacked as Persepolis head coach, he was manager of Shahbaz B team for more than ten years.

| Team | Nation | From | To | Record | | | | | | | |
| Team | Nation | From | To | G | W | D | L | Win % | GF | GA | GD |
|---|---|---|---|---|---|---|---|---|---|---|---|
| Persepolis | (Iran) | 6 March 1975 | 9 May 1975 | 15 | 7 | 4 | 4 | 46.67 | 23 | 14 | +7 |

== After retirement ==
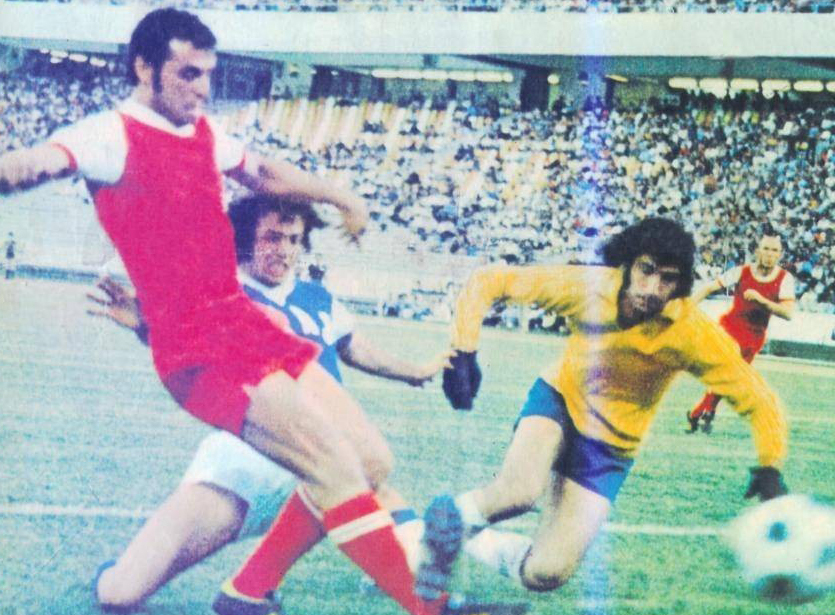
Homayoun Behzadi scoring a goal against Taj (Esteghlal) during the well-known Shishtayiha Match in Tehran derby

=== Membership in Persepolis Hall of Fame ===
He was named as one of the members of Persepolis F.C. Hall of Fame and the club thanked him for his great performance during his senior career at Persepolis. The club gave him a statue of his face and named him as one of the twelve great players of Persepolis in the 1970s.

=== Illness and death ===
He suffered a heart attack and was transferred to Tehran hospital in April 2013. After two days, he was transferred to Day hospital and his personal doctor announced that his general health is good. He was released on 12 May 2013.

On 22 January 2016, Behzadi died in his home at the age of 74.

== Honours ==
=== Club ===
Shahin

- Tehran Football League
  - Winner (7): 1958–59, 1959–60, 1964–65, 1965–66
  - Runner-Up (6): 1961–62, 1962–63
- Tehran Hazfi Cup
  - Winner (1): 1962–63

Paykan

- Tehran Football League
  - Winner (1): 1969–70

Persepolis

- Iranian Football League
  - Winners (2): 1971–72 1973–74
  - Runners-Up (1): 1974–75

=== International ===
- AFC Asian Cup
  - Winner (2): 1968, 1972
- Asian Games
  - Runner-Up (1): 1966

=== Individual ===
- AFC Asian Cup Top goalscorer: 1968
- Persepolis Hall of Fame: 2013
- Asian Football Hall of Fame: 2014
