= 1974–75 Takht Jamshid Cup =

Takht Jamshid Cup
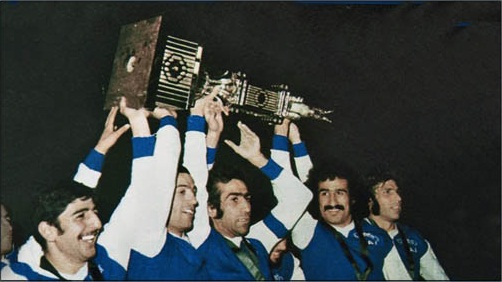
- Season: 1974–75
- Champions: Taj
- Matches: 132
- Goals: 267 (2.02 per match)
- Top goalscorer: Gholam Hossein Mazloumi (10)

The 1974–75 season was the second season of the Takht Jamshid Cup of Iranian football. The competition was won by Taj Football Club of Tehran.

== Results ==
Pos	Team	Pld	W	D	L	GF	GA	GD	Pts
1	Taj (C)	22	15	3	4	30	14	+16	33
2	Persepolis	22	12	7	3	32	13	+19	31
3	Homa	22	13	5	4	29	16	+13	31
4	PAS Tehran	22	12	6	4	28	14	+14	30
5	Sanat Naft Abadan	22	8	8	6	23	24	−1	24
6	Malavan	22	8	7	7	31	24	+7	23
7	Bank Melli	22	5	11	6	20	16	+4	21
8	Oghab	22	5	7	10	18	25	−7	17
9	Rah Ahan	22	5	5	12	15	29	−14	15
10	Sepahan	22	4	6	12	10	27	−17	14
11	Zob Ahan	22	4	5	13	14	35	−21	13
12	Ab va Bargh Ahvaz	22	5	2	15	17	30	−13	12

(C) Champions
- Note: No team was relegated.

== Top goal scorers ==
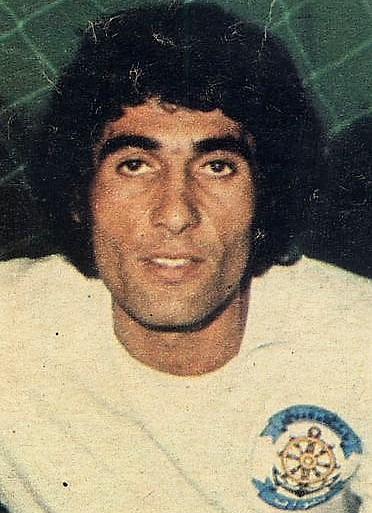
Aziz Espandar, the highest scoring player of the season.

Pos	Scorer	Goals	Team
1st	(Iran) Aziz Espandar	10	Malavan
	(Iran) Gholam Hossein Mazloumi	10	Taj
3rd	(Iran) Asghar Sharafi	9	Pas
4th	(Iran) Massoud Azari	8	Rah Ahan
	(Iran) Ghafour Jahani	8	Malavan
