= Shahin Tehran F.C. =

Iranian football club

Shahin
- Full name: Shahin Tehran Football Club
- Founded: 1942, as Shahin; 1973, as Shabaz; 1979, as Shahin
- Ground: Shahid Shiroudi Stadium; Tehran, Iran
- Capacity: 30,000
- League: Tehran Province league
- 2013–14: Tehran Province league, 8th
Home colours	Away colours

Shahin Tehran Football Club (Persian: باشگاه فوتبال شاهین تهران, romanized: Shāhīn meaning Falcon), also spelled Shaahin or Shaheen, from 1973 to 1979 known as Shahbaz (Persian: شهباز, romanized: Shahbāz, meaning Shahbaz), is an Iranian football club based in Tehran, Iran. Shahin A.C. is located in the eastern part of Tehran in the Narmak neighborhood (Golestan Street). Shahin F.C. was dissolved in 1967 for political reasons. The club was revived after the Iranian Revolution in 1979. Due to the Iran–Iraq War, the national league was not held during the 1980s.

They currently compete in the Tehran provincial league.

== History ==
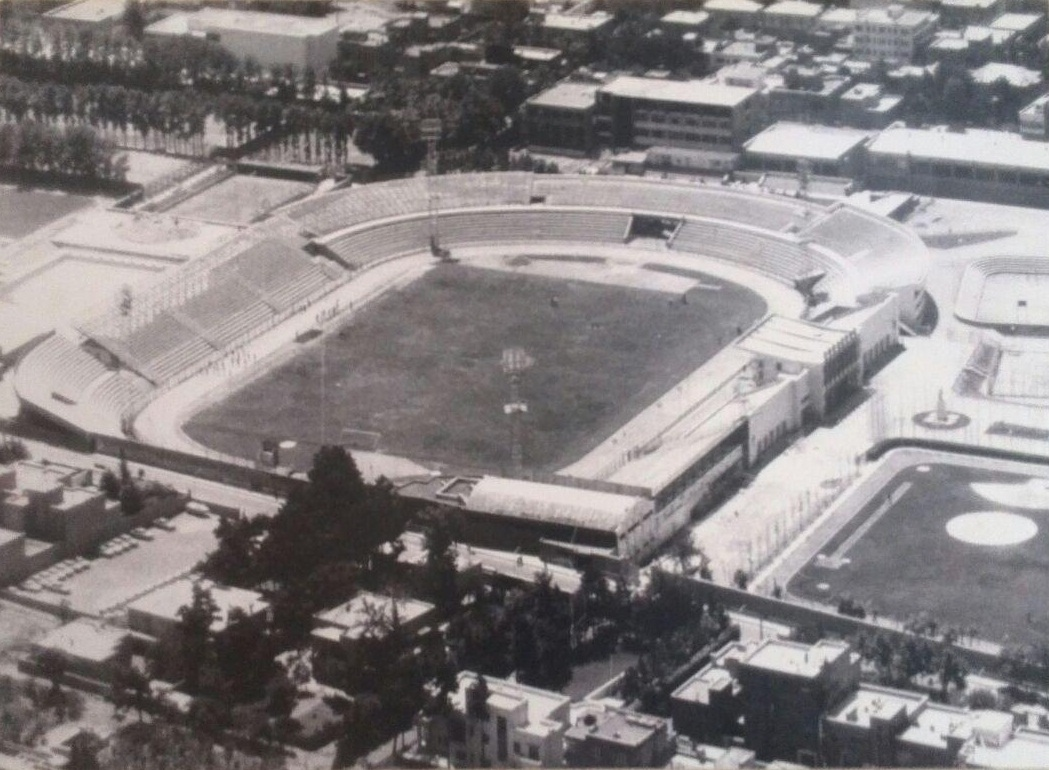
Amjadieh Stadium home of Shahin F.C.

In June 1942, Dr. Abbas Ekrami opened the poetry book Divan-e Hafez and saw the following line about Shahin (Falcon), after which he named the club Shahin,

در هوا چند معلق زنی و جلوه کنی
ای کبوتر نگران باش که شاهین آمد
In the air, you will rotate a few times with glory;
oh pigeon, be worried, Falcon is on its way.

Ekrami founded the club with help of some young students under the motto:

اول اخلاق، دوم درس، سوم ورزش
First ethics, second education, third sports.

Shahin F.C. in mid 1960s Many of the players shown in this photo went on to play for Persepolis.

Shahin FC, without any doubt was the most popular football club in the history of Iranian football. Shahin produced many talented players like Parviz Dehdari, Masoud Boroumand, Homayoun Behzadi, Jafar Kashani, Hossein Kalani, Hamid Shirzadegan, Iraj Saeli, Mahmoud Sajjadi, Mohammad Hossein Ziaei, Ghasem Movafegh and many more that played for Team Melli. These talents made Shahin popular in the 1960s but its very popularity was viewed as a threat by the Iran Football Federation and the Keihan Varzeshi newspaper (Iran's most important sports publication at the time). The conflict between them became worse and on July 9, 1967, two days after Shahin's 3–1 win against Tehranjavan F.C., the Iran Sports Organization declared Shahin F.C. as dissolved. League attendance dropped and other clubs tried to sign Shahin players.

=== Shahbaz Era ===
In 1973 Shahin F.C. decided to come back but returned with the name of its former third team Shahbaz F.C. and participated in Takht Jamshid Cup professional soccer League. Shahbaz F.C. was leading the league in the 1978–1979 season which was unfinished due to Iranian Revolution in 1979. After the revolution, the club reverted to its original name, "Shahin".

In 2009/10 Shahin was competing in the third ranked 2nd Division successfully until the last stage, when they failed to be promoted to the Azadegan 1st Division. In 2010/11 Shahin kept its place in the 3rd Division.

In 2011/12 Shahin finished last in its group and therefore was relegated to the provincial league for 2012/13.

== Branches and affiliated clubs ==
Shahin F.C. had several attached teams and branches under the name and license of Shahin F.C. in different cities of Iran, including Shahin Bushehr F.C. (est. 1942), Shahin Ahvaz F.C. (est. 1948) and Shahin Isfahan F.C.(est. 1953). In 1967 due to the political problems that arose in the Shahin F.C. organization, the other teams were forced to cease operations as well. Some had to deactivate for a period of time, while other teams renamed and continued under different names.

Persepolis F.C. started the 1968 season with Parviz Dehdari as manager. Although Shahin Tehran established in a new team under the name of Shahbaz, it was failed to get back its popularity again.

Shahin Isfahan F.C. changed its name to Sepahan F.C.. The club is one of the representatives of Isfahan Province in Takht Jamshid Cup national league. The team now plays under the name of Foolad Mobarakeh Sepahan.

Shahin Bushehr was renamed Shahin Pars Jonoubi Bushehr in 2007 and promoted to IPL in 2009. The club is now owned by Pars Special Economic Energy Zone, based in Asalouyeh, Bushehr Province and currently competes in the 2nd Division after being relegated from Azadegan League in 2013.

Shahin Ahvaz F.C. was founded in 1948 and was one of Shahin Tehran F.C. branches at the time. They currently compete in the Provincial Leagues.

== Colours and crest ==
The usual home kit includes a white shirt, black shorts, and white socks. The away kit of the club is commonly with a black background.

== Achievements ==
=== Takht Jamshid Cup ===
- Third place: 1976/77
- Leader: 1978/79 (in autumn 1978 the season was canceled due to the political uprisings, which ended with the Iranian Revolution in February 1979)

=== Tehran Football League ===
- Winner (3): 1951–52,1958–59,1965–66
- Runner-up (8): 1948–49, 1949–50, 1947–48, 1949–50, 1961–62, 1963–64, 1985_86,1986_87

=== Tehran Hazfi Cup (Record) ===
- Winner (5): 1947–48, 1948–49, 1949–50, 1962–63, 1980–81
- Runner-up (3): 1952–53, 1956–57, 1957–58

=== Espandi Cup ===
- Third place: 1979

Current Exuctive Director:Alireza Kushanfar

== Season-by-season ==
The table below chronicles the achievements of Shahin in various competitions since 1965.

Season	League									Hazfi Cup	Notes	Leagues Top goalscorer		Coach
Season	Division	P	W	D	L	F	A	Pts	Pos	Hazfi Cup	Notes	Name	Goals	Coach
1965–66	TFL	12	11	0	1	36	8	22	1st					Parviz Dehdari
1966–67	TFL	11	6	2	3	23	11	14	4th					Parviz Dehdari
1967–68	TFL	Shahin dissolved								Not held				
1968–69	TFL	Absence												
1969–70	TFL	Absence												
1970–71	TFL	Absence												
1971–72	TFL	Absence												
1972–73	TFL	Absence												
1973–74	TFL	11	4	4	3	11	12	12	5th					
1974–75	TFL	13	0	7	6	6	13	7	13th					
1975–76	TFL	13	11	2	0	27	9	24	1st		Promoted to the Takht Jamshid Cup			Bagher Sepahsalari / Mehrab Shahrokhi
1976–77	TJC	30	13	10	7	36	24	36	3rd			Gholam Hossein Mazloumi	19	Nazem Ganjapoor
1977–78	TJC	30	7	13	10	31	29	27	11th	Not held		Mohammad Reza Adelkhani	10	Nazem Ganjapoor
1978–79	TJC	Not Completed Due to Iranian Revolution								Not held				Frans van Balkom
1981–82	TFL	13	3	9	1	10	5	15	6th	Not held				Kazem Rahimi
1982–83	TFL	17	8	3	6	20	17	19	6th	Not held				Nasser Ebrahimi
1983–84	TFL	17	7	4	7	15	11	18	7th	Not held				Nasser Ebrahimi
1984–85	TFL	Not Finished								Not held				Mehrab Shahrokhi
1985–86	TFL	9	7	2	0	20	4	16	2nd	Not held				
1986–87	TFL	8	6	2	0	17	5	14	2nd					Nasrollah Abdollahi
1987–88	TFL	17	5	7	5	11	11	17	7th					Nasrollah Abdollahi
1988–89	TFL	16	6	3	7	12	9	21	9th					Akbar Maleki / Amir Agha Hossieni
1989–90	TFL	15	6	8	1	16	7	20	4th	Not held				
1990–91	TFL	17	3	9	5	14	16	15	9th					Nasrollah Abdollahi
1991–92	TFL	15	4	7	4	16	14	15	7th					
1992–93	TFL	26	4	11	11	15	27	19	11th	Not held	Relegated to the Iran Football's 2nd Division			
1993–94	TFL2													
1994–95	TFL2										Promoted to the Tehran Province league			
1995–96	TFL	14	5	4	5	11	12	19	6th					
1996–97	TFL	15	3	5	7	9	21	14	15th		Relegated to the Tehran Province league Div 2			
1997–98	TFL2									Not held				
1998–99	TFL2													
1999-00	TFL2													
2000–01	TFL2													
2001–02	TFL2													
2002–03	TFL2													
2003–04	TFL2										Promoted to the Tehran Province league			
2004–05	TFL	15	5	4	6	27	25	21	7th					
2005–06	TFL													
2006–07	TFL													
2007–08	TFL													
2008–09	TFL										Promoted to the Iran Football's 3rd Division			
2009–10	Div 3	22	12	5	5	43	26	41	2nd					
2010–11	Div 3	22	11	7	4	34	20	10	4th					
2011–12	Div 3	22	1	5	16	18	62	8	12th		Relegated to the Tehran Province league Div 2			
2012–13	TFL													
2013–14	TFL													
2014–15	TFL													
2015-16														
2016-17														
2017-18														

=== Key ===
- P = Played
- W = Games won
- D = Games drawn
- L = Games lost
- F = Goals for
- A = Goals against
- Pts = Points
- Pos = Final position
- TJC = Takht Jamshid Cup
- TFL = Tehran Football League
- TFL2 = Tehran Football League's 2nd Div.
- Div 3 = 3rd Division

Champions	Runners-up

== Founder and manager ==
- (Iran) Dr. Abbas Ekrami (1942–1970)

== Managers ==
- (Iran) Shapoor Sarhadi
- (Iran) Amirhoshang Nikkhah Baharami
- (Iran) Jafar Kashani
- (Iran) Amirhoshang Nikkhah Bahrami

== World Cup players ==
(Argentina) 1978 FIFA World Cup

- (Iran) Nasrollah Abdollahi
- (Iran) Nasser Hejazi
- (Iran) Ebrahim Ghasempour
- (Iran) Hamid-Majid Tajmuri
- (Iran) Majid Bishkar

== See also ==
- Hazfi Cup
- Iran Football's 3rd Division 2011–12

=== Official ===
- (in Persian) Official club website
