= 1968 AFC Asian Cup =

جام ملت‌های آسیا ۱۹۶۸

Tournament details
- Host country: Iran
- Dates: 10–19 May
- Teams: 5
- Venue: 1 (in 1 host city)

Final positions
- Champions: Iran (1st title)
- Runners-up: Burma
- Third place: Israel
- Fourth place: Republic of China

Tournament statistics
- Matches played: 10
- Goals scored: 32 (3.2 per match)
- Attendance: 182,000 (18,200 per match)
- Top scorer(s): (Iran) Homayoun Behzadi (Israel) Moshe Romano (Israel) Giora Spiegel (4 goals each)

The 1968 AFC Asian Cup was the 4th edition of the men's AFC Asian Cup, a quadrennial international football tournament organised by the Asian Football Confederation (AFC). The finals were held in Iran between 10 and 19 May 1968, with five teams competing in a round-robin format with no final for what would be the last time. It was also the first tournament with 90-minute games, after 80-minute games in the first three editions.

The home team Iran won with a perfect record of four wins.

== Qualification ==
Team	Qualified as	Qualified on	Previous appearance
Iran	Hosts	N/A	0 (debut)
Hong Kong	Central Zone winners	2 April 1967	2 (1956, 1964)
Republic of China	Eastern zone winners	7 August 1967	1 (1960)
Israel	Western Zone 1 winners	1967	3 (1956, 1960, 1964)
Burma	Western Zone 2 winners	16 November 1967	0 (debut)

== Venues ==
Tehran is located in Iran	Tehran
Tehran is located in Iran	Amjadieh Stadium
Tehran is located in Iran	Capacity: 30,000

== Results ==
Pos	Team	Pld	W	D	L	GF	GA	GD	Pts	Qualification
1	Iran (H)	4	4	0	0	11	2	+9	8	Champions
2	Burma	4	2	1	1	5	4	+1	5	Runners-up
3	Israel	4	2	0	2	11	5	+6	4	Third place
4	Republic of China	4	0	2	2	3	10	−7	2	Fourth place
5	Hong Kong	4	0	1	3	2	11	−9	1	Fifth place

Source: RSSSF
(H) Hosts

All times are Iran Standard Time (UTC+3:30)

10 May 1968
16:00

Iran	2–0	Hong Kong
Behzadi 70'; Jabbari 89'

Amjadieh Stadium, Tehran
Attendance: 28,000
Referee: Norman Boswell (Malaysia)

11 May 1968
18:00

Republic of China	1–1	Burma
Wong Chi-keung 64'		Hla Htay 14'

Amjadieh Stadium, Tehran
Attendance: 6,000
Referee: S. K. Bhattacharya (India)

12 May 1968
18:00

Hong Kong	1–6	Israel
Yuan Kuan Yick 75'		Spiegler 10', 65'; Spiegel 52', 53'; Romano 61', 70'

Amjadieh Stadium, Tehran
Attendance: 15,000
Referee: Alex Vaz (India)

13 May 1968
18:00

Iran	4–0	Republic of China
Behzadi 34'; Kalani 35'; Eftekhari 51'; Farzami 57'

Amjadieh Stadium, Tehran
Attendance: 25,000
Referee: S. K. Bhattacharya (India)

14 May 1968
18:00

Burma	1–0	Israel
Ye Nyunt 42'

Amjadieh Stadium, Tehran
Attendance: 20,000
Referee: Norman Boswell (Malaysia)

15 May 1968
18:00

Hong Kong	1–1	Republic of China
Li Kwok Keung 14'		Mak Tian-fu 37'

Amjadieh Stadium, Tehran
Attendance: 3,000
Referee: S. K. Bhattacharya (India)

16 May 1968
18:00

Burma	1–3	Iran
Hla Htay 50'		Kalani 2'; Eftekhari 60'; Behzadi 70'

Amjadieh Stadium, Tehran
Attendance: 25,000
Referee: Alex Vaz (India)

17 May 1968
18:00

Israel	4–1	Republic of China
Romano 2', 60'; Rosenthal 70'; Spiegel 76'		Li Huan-wen 45+1'

Amjadieh Stadium, Tehran
Attendance: 20,000
Referee: S. K. Bhattacharya (India)

18 May 1968
18:00

Burma	2–0	Hong Kong
Aung Khin 80'; Suk Bahadur 85'

Amjadieh Stadium, Tehran
Attendance: 2,000
Referee: Norman Boswell (Malaysia)

19 May 1968
18:00

Iran	2–1	Israel
Behzadi 75'; Ghelichkhani 87'		Spiegel 52'

Amjadieh Stadium, Tehran
Attendance: 38,000
Referee: Alex Vaz (India)

== Winners ==
1968 AFC Asian Cup winners

Iran
First title

== Goalscorers ==
With 4 goals, Homayoun Behzadi of Iran, Giora Spiegel and Moshe Romano of Israel are the top scorers of the tournament. In total, 32 goals were scored by 18 players, with none of them credited as own goal.

4 goals

- (Iran) Homayoun Behzadi
- (Israel) Giora Spiegel
- (Israel) Moshe Romano

2 goals

- (Myanmar) Hla Htay
- (Iran) Akbar Eftekhari
- (Iran) Hossein Kalani
- (Israel) Mordechai Spiegler

1 goal

- (Myanmar) Aung Khin
- (Myanmar) Suk Bahadur
- (Myanmar) Ye Nyunt
- (Iran) Ali Jabbari
- (Iran) Gholam Hossein Farzami
- (Iran) Parviz Ghelichkhani
- (Israel) Shmuel Rosenthal
- (Hong Kong) Li Kwok Keung
- (Hong Kong) Yuan Kuan Yick
- (Taiwan) Li Huan-wen
- (Taiwan) Mak Tian-fu
- (Taiwan) Wong Chi-keung
