= List of Iranian football champions =

Iranian League (1st tier)

Local League (1970–1972) Takht Jamshid Cup (1973–1978) Qods League (1989–1990) Azadegan League (Note: Azadegan League is now the name of the 2nd highest division in Iran, only the IPL is higher.) (1991–2001) Pro League (2001–)
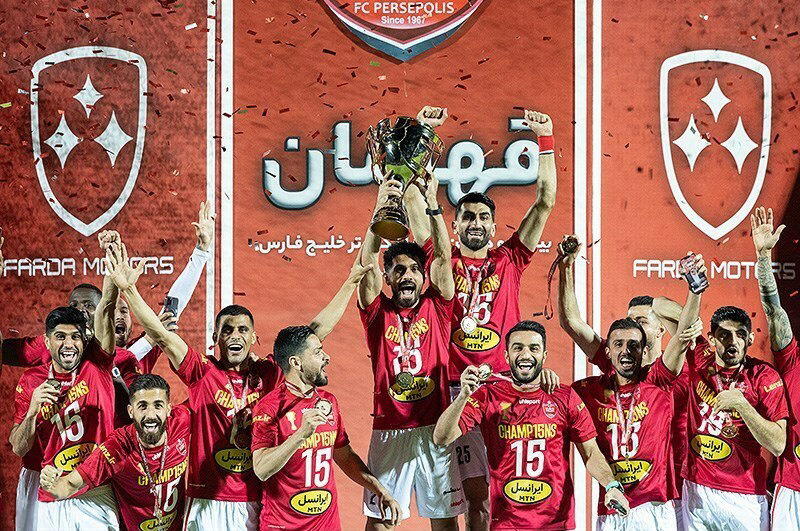
- Persepolis, record holder of champion with 16 times champions
- Founded
- 1970
- Number of Teams
- 16
- Current Champions
- Tractor
- Country
- Iran
- Most successful club
- Persepolis (16 times champions)

The Iranian football champions are the winners of the highest league in Iranian football, which since 2001–02 is the Pro League. The title has been contested since 1970, in varying forms of competition. While Persepolis has won a record 16 championship titles.

== Champions ==
=== Local League (1970–72) ===
Year	Winner (number of titles)	Runners-up	Third-Place	Top scorer (club) (goals)
1970–71	Taj (1)	Pas Tehran	Taj Abadan	(Iran) Hossein Kalani (Persepolis) (6)
1971–72	Persepolis (1)	Pas Tehran	Taj	(Iran) Hossein Kalani (Persepolis) (12)

=== Takht Jamshid Cup (1973–78) ===
Year	Winner (number of titles)	Runners-up	Third-Place	Top scorer (club) (goals)
1973–74	Persepolis (2)	Taj	Pas Tehran	(Iran) Gholam Hossein Mazloumi (Taj) (Iran) Aziz Espandar (Malavan) (15)
1974–75	Taj (2)	Persepolis	Homa	(Iran) Gholam Hossein Mazloumi (Taj) (10)
1975–76	Persepolis (3)	Homa	Pas Tehran	(Iran) Nasser Nouraei (Homa) (10)
1976–77	Pas Tehran (1)	Persepolis	Shahbaz	(Iran) Gholam Hossein Mazloumi (Shahbaz) (19)
1977–78	Pas Tehran (2)	Persepolis	Malavan	(Iran) Aziz Espandar (Malavan) (16)
~~1978–79~~	Not completed due to the Islamic Revolution in Iran			

=== Qods League (1989–90) ===
Year	Winner (number of titles)	Runners-up	Third-Place	Top scorer (club) (goals)
1989–90	Esteghlal (Note: Taj changed its name to Esteghlal in 1979.) (3)	Persepolis	Malavan	(Iran) Mohammad Ahmadzadeh (Malavan) (16)

=== Azadegan League (1991–2001) ===
Year	Winner (number of titles)	Runners-up	Third-Place	Top scorer (club) (goals)
1991–92	Pas Tehran (3)	Esteghlal	Persepolis	(Iran) Farshad Pious (Persepolis) (11)
1992–93	Pas Tehran (4)	Persepolis	Keshavarz–Tractor	(Iran) Jamshid Shahmohammadi (Keshavarz) (11)
1993–94	**Saipa** (1)	Persepolis	Jonoob Ahvaz	(Iran) Abbas Simakani (Zob Ahan) (17)
1994–95	Saipa (2)	Esteghlal	Keshavarz	(Iran) Farshad Pious (Persepolis) (20)
1995–96	Persepolis (4)	Bahman	Esteghlal	(Iran) Mohammad Momeni (Polyacryl) (19)
1996–97	Persepolis (5)	Bahman	Sepahan	(Iran) Ali Asghar Modir Roosta (Bahman) (18)
1997–98	Esteghlal (4)	Pas Tehran	Zob Ahan	(Iran) Hossein Khatibi (Tractor) (16)
1998–99	**Persepolis** (6)	Esteghlal	Sepahan	(Iran) Koroush Barmak (Tractor) (Iran) Abdoljalil Golcheshmeh (Aboomoslem) (14)
1999–2000	Persepolis (7)	Esteghlal	Fajr Sepasi	(Iraq) Mohanned Mehdi Al-Nadawi (Sanat Naft) (15)
2000–01	Esteghlal (5)	Persepolis	Saipa	(Iran) Reza Sahebi (Zob Ahan) (Iran) Ali Samereh (Esteghlal) (14)

=== Iran Pro League (2001–present) ===
Year	Winner (number of titles)	Runners-up	Third-Place	Top scorer (club) (goals)
2001–02	Persepolis (8)	Esteghlal	Foolad	(Iran) Reza Enayati (Aboomoslem) (17)
2002–03	Sepahan (1)	Pas Tehran	Persepolis	(Iran) Edmund Bezik (Sepahan) (13)
2003–04	Pas Tehran (5)	Esteghlal	Foolad	(Iran) Ali Daei (Persepolis) (16)
2004–05	Foolad (1)	Zob Ahan	Esteghlal	(Iran) Reza Enayati (Esteghlal) (20)
2005–06	Esteghlal (6)	Pas Tehran	Saipa	(Iran) Reza Enayati (Esteghlal) (21)
2006–07	Saipa (3)	Esteghlal Ahvaz	Persepolis	(Iran) Mehdi Rajabzadeh (Zob Ahan) (Nigeria) Daniel Olerum (Aboomoslem) (17)
2007–08	Persepolis (9)	Sepahan	Saba Battery	(Iran) Mohsen Khalili (Persepolis) (Iran) Hadi Asghari (Rah Ahan) (18)
2008–09	Esteghlal (7)	Zob Ahan	Mes Kerman	(Iran) Arash Borhani (Esteghlal) (21)
2009–10	Sepahan (2)	Zob Ahan	Esteghlal	(Iraq) Emad Mohammed (Sepahan) (19)
2010–11	Sepahan (3)	Esteghlal	Zob Ahan	(Iran) Reza Norouzi (Foolad) (24)
2011–12	Sepahan (4)	Tractor	Esteghlal	(Iran) Karim Ansarifard (Saipa) (21)
2012–13	Esteghlal (8)	Tractor	Sepahan	(Iran) Jalal Rafkhaei (Malavan) (19)
2013–14	Foolad (2)	Persepolis	Naft Tehran	(Iran) Karim Ansarifard (Tractor) (14)
2014–15	Sepahan (5)	Tractor	Naft Tehran	(Brazil) Éder Luciano (Tractor) (20)
2015–16	Esteghlal Khuzestan (1)	Persepolis	Esteghlal	(Iran) Mehdi Taremi (Persepolis) (16)
2016–17	Persepolis (10)	Esteghlal	Tractor	(Iran) Mehdi Taremi (Persepolis) (18)
2017–18	Persepolis (11)	Zob Ahan	Esteghlal	(Iran) Ali Alipour (Persepolis) (19)
2018–19	**Persepolis** (12)	Sepahan	Esteghlal	(Brazil) Kiros Stanlley (Sepahan) (Brazil) Luciano Pereira Mendes (Foolad) (16)
2019–20	Persepolis (13)	Esteghlal	Foolad	(Mali) Cheick Diabaté (Esteghlal) (15)
2020–21	Persepolis (14)	Sepahan	Esteghlal	(Iran) Sajjad Shahbazzadeh (Sepahan) (20)
2021–22	Esteghlal (9)	Persepolis	Sepahan	(Nigeria) Godwin Mensha (Mes Rafsanjan) (14)
2022–23	**Persepolis** (15)	Sepahan	Esteghlal	(Iran) Shahriyar Moghanlou (Sepahan) (13)
2023–24	Persepolis (16)	Esteghlal	Sepahan	(Iran) Shahriyar Moghanlou (Sepahan) (16)
2024–25	Tractor (1)	Sepahan	Persepolis	(Iran) Amirhossein Hosseinzadeh (Tractor) (14)
~~2025–26~~	Not completed due to the 2026 Iran–USA and Israel War			

Bold indicates Double winners – i.e. League and Hazfi Cup winners OR League and Champions League winners
Italic indicates Treble winners – i.e. League, Hazfi Cup and Champions League winners

Asian Club Championship/ AFC Champions League/ AFC Champions League Elite Qualified	Asian Cup Winners' Cup Qualified	AFC Champions League Two Qualified	AFC Challenge League Qualified

=== Notes ===
- No national championships were held in 1972–73, between 1979–1988 (due to the Iranian Revolution and the Iran–Iraq War), and in 1990–91 (due to fixture congestion with the national team's competitions).
- Esteghlal didn't qualify for ACL in 2020/21 and 2022/23 seasons due to suspension, despite earning 3rd places. Tractor qualified for ACL in 2022/23 season as Esteghlal's replacement after earning 4th place.
- Like Esteghlal in 2020/21 season, Persepolis didn't qualify for ACL due to suspension, despite winning the title. Sepahan qualified for ACL instead of both teams after finishing league in 2nd place.

== Performances ==
Titles won by club (%)
1. Persepolis – 16 (38.1%)
2. Esteghlal – 9 (21.4%)
3. Sepahan – 5 (11.9%)
4. Pas Tehran – 5 (11.9%)
5. Saipa – 3 (7.15%)
6. Foolad – 2 (4.76%)
7. Tractor – 1 (2.38%)
8. E. Khuzestan – 1 (2.38%)

=== Clubs ===
The following table lists the performance of each club describing winners of the Championship.

Club	Winners	Runners-up	Winning seasons
Persepolis	16	10	1971–72, 1973–74, 1975–76, 1995–96, 1996–97, 1998–99, 1999–2000, 2001–02, 2007–08, 2016–17, 2017–18, 2018–19, 2019–20, 2020–21, 2022–23, 2023–24
Esteghlal	9	11	1970–71, 1974–75, 1989–90, 1997–98, 2000–01, 2005–06, 2008–09, 2012–13, 2021–22
Sepahan	5	5	2002–03, 2009–10, 2010–11, 2011–12, 2014–15
Pas Tehran	5	5	1976–77, 1977–78, 1991–92, 1992–93, 2003–04
Saipa	3	0	1993–94, 1994–95, 2006–07
Foolad	2	0	2004–05, 2013–14
Tractor	1	3	2024–25
Esteghlal Khuzestan	1	0	2015–16

=== Total titles won by city ===
The following table lists the Iranian football champions by city.

City	Titles	Winning clubs
Tehran	32	Persepolis (16), Esteghlal (9), Pas Tehran (5), Saipa (2)
Isfahan	5	Sepahan (5)
Ahvaz	3	Foolad (2), Esteghlal Khuzestan (1)
Karaj	1	Saipa (1)
Tabriz	1	Tractor (1)

=== Total titles won by province ===
The following table lists the Iranian football champions by Province.

Province	Titles	Winning clubs
Tehran	33	Persepolis (16), Esteghlal (9), Pas Tehran (5), Saipa (3)
Isfahan	5	Sepahan (5)
Khuzestan	3	Foolad (2), Esteghlal Khuzestan (1)
East Azerbaijan	1	Tractor (1)

^1 Since 2003 to 2015, Saipa Club had played its games in Karaj (Capital of Alborz Province). but before the formation of the Alborz province in 2010, Karaj was considered part of the Tehran province in Iran's divisions.

== See also ==
- Football in Iran
- Iranian football league system
- Hazfi cup
