= List of Iranian football league top goal scorers =

The top goalscorers each season of club football competitions in Iran are listed below.

== Top division nationwide league ==
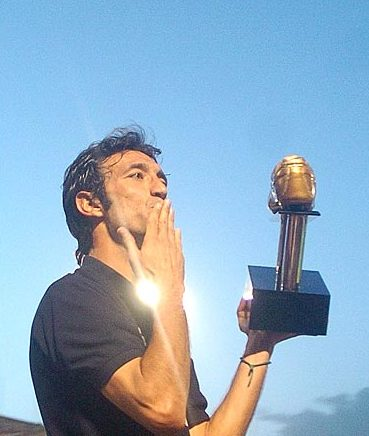
Reza Enayati receiving the golden boot for 2005–06 Iran Pro League

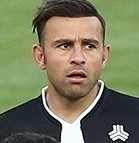
Reza Norouzi, 2010–11 top scorer, holds the record for the most goals in a single league season with 24 goals.

Player (X)	Denotes the number of times the player had won the award at that time (for players with more than one award)
	Denotes player's club won league that season

Season	Player	Club	Goals
1970–71	(Iran) Hossein Kalani	Persepolis	7
1971–72	(Iran) Hossein Kalani (2)	Persepolis	11
1971–72	(Iran) Safar Iranpak	Persepolis	11
1973–74	(Iran) Gholam Hossein Mazloumi	Taj	15
1974–75	(Iran) Gholam Hossein Mazloumi (2)	Taj	10
1974–75	(Iran) Aziz Espandar	Malavan	10
1975–76	(Iran) Naser Nouraei	Homa	18
1976–77	(Iran) Gholam Hossein Mazloumi (3)	Shahbaz	19
1977–78	(Iran) Aziz Espandar (2)	Malavan	16
1978–79	was cancelled due to the Islamic Revolution of Iran.		
1989–90	(Iran) Mohammad Ahmadzadeh	Malavan	16
1991–92	(Iran) Farshad Pious	Persepolis	11
1992–93	(Iran) Jamshid Shahmohammadi	Keshavarz	11
1993–94	(Iran) Abbas Simakani	Zob Ahan	17
1994–95	(Iran) Farshad Pious (2)	Persepolis	20
1995–96	(Iran) Mohammad Momeni	Polyacryl Esfahan	19
1996–97	(Iran) Ali Asghar Modir Roosta	Bahman	18
1997–98	(Iran) Hossein Khatibi	Shahrdari Tabriz	16
1998–99	(Iran) Kourosh Barmak	Tractor	14
1998–99	(Iran) Abdoljalil Golcheshmeh	Aboumoslem	14
1999–00	(Iraq) Mohannad Mahdi Al-Nadawi	Sanat Naft	15
2000–01	(Iran) Reza Sahebi	Zob Ahan	14
2000–01	(Iran) Ali Samereh	Esteghlal	14
2001–02	(Iran) Reza Enayati	Aboumoslem	17
2002–03	(Iran) Edmond Bezik	Sepahan	13
2003–04	(Iran) Ali Daei	Persepolis	16
2004–05	(Iran) Reza Enayati (2)	Esteghlal	20
2005–06	(Iran) Reza Enayati (3)	Esteghlal	21
2006–07	(Nigeria) Daniel Olerum	Aboumoslem	17
2006–07	(Iran) Mehdi Rajabzadeh	Zob Ahan	17
2007–08	(Iran) Hadi Asghari	Rah Ahan	18
2007–08	(Iran) Mohsen Khalili	Persepolis	18
2008–09	(Iran) Arash Borhani	Esteghlal	20
2009–10	(Iraq) Emad Mohammed	Sepahan	19
2010–11	(Iran) Reza Norouzi	Foolad	24
2011–12	(Iran) Karim Ansarifard	Saipa	21
2012–13	(Iran) Jalal Rafkhaei	Malavan	19
2013–14	(Iran) Karim Ansarifard (2)	Tractor	14
2014–15	(Brazil) Edinho	Tractor	20
2015–16	(Iran) Mehdi Taremi	Persepolis	16
2016–17	(Iran) Mehdi Taremi (2)	Persepolis	18
2017–18	(Iran) Ali Alipour	Persepolis	19
2018–19	(Brazil) Kiros Stanlley	Sepahan	16
2018–19	(Brazil) Luciano Pereira	Foolad	16
2019–20	(Mali) Cheick Diabaté	Esteghlal	15
2020–21	(Iran) Sajjad Shahbazzadeh	Sepahan	20
2021–22	(Nigeria) Godwin Mensha	Mes Rafsanjan	14
2022–23	(Iran) Shahriar Moghanlou	Sepahan	13
2023–24	(Iran) Shahriar Moghanlou (2)	Sepahan	16
2024–25	(Iran) Amirhossein Hosseinzadeh	Tractor	14
2024–25	Not completed due to 2026 Iran–USA and Israel war.		

== Multiple awards won by player ==
The following table lists the number of awards won by players who have won at least two Golden Boot awards.

Awards	Player	Country	Seasons
3	Gholamhossein Mazloumi	Iran	1973–74, 1974–75, 1976–77
3	Reza Enayati	Iran	2001–02, 2004–05, 2005–06
2	Hossein Kalani	Iran	1970–71, 1971–72
2	Aziz Espandar	Iran	1974–75, 1977–78
2	Farshad Pious	Iran	1991–92, 1994–95
2	Karim Ansarifard	Iran	2011–12, 2013–14
2	Mehdi Taremi	Iran	2011–12, 2016–17
2	Shahriar Moghanlou	Iran	2022–23, 2023–24

== By Club ==
Rank	Players	Total
Persepolis	7	10
Esteghlal	5	7
Sepahan	5	6
Malavan	3	4
Tractor	4	4
Aboumoslem	3	3
Zob Ahan	3	3
Foolad	2	2
Saipa	1	1
Rah Ahan	1	1
Sanat Naft	1	1
Bahman	1	1
Polyacryl Esfahan	1	1
Keshavarz	1	1
Shahbaz	1	1
Homa	1	1
Mes Rafsanjan	1	1

== By Nationality ==
Country	Players	Total
Iran	31	41
Brazil	3	3
Iraq	2	2
Nigeria	2	2
Mali	1	1

== Tehran Provincial League ==
Player (X)	Denotes the number of times the player had won the award at that time (for players with more than one award)
	Denotes player's club won league that season

The list below contains the top goalscorer(s) for the Tehran Province League, first tier of Iran football in 1980s.

Season	Top scorer	Club	Goals
1979–1980	Left unfinished due to crowd violence in Esteghlal-Persepolis friendly match		
1980–1981	Left unfinished due to Iran-Iraq War		
1981–1982	(Iran) Naser Mohammadkhani	Homa	11
1982–1983	(Iran) Ali Parvin	Persepolis	15
1983–1984	(Iran) Naser Mohammadkhani (2)	Persepolis	13
1984–1985	Left unfinished due crowd violence in Persepolis-PAS match		
1985–86	(Iran) Karim Bavi	Shahin	9
1986–87	(Iran) Farshad Pious	Persepolis	7
1987–88	(Iran) Farshad Pious (2)	Persepolis	13
1988–89	(Iran) Farshad Pious (3)	Persepolis	13
1989–90	(Iran) Ali Asghar Modir Roosta	PAS	14
1990–91	(Iran) Farshad Pious (4)	Persepolis	16
1991–92	(Iran) Farshad Pious (5)	Persepolis	16

== See also ==
- List of Iran Pro League all-time top goal scorers
