= Tehran Derby =

Football match between Persepolis F.C. and Esteghlal F.C.

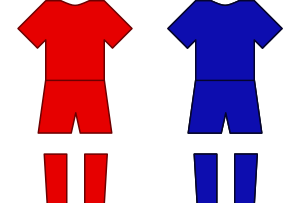
- Team kits – Persepolis in red, Esteghlal in blue
- Location: Tehran, Iran
- Teams: Esteghlal; Persepolis
- Latest meeting: Esteghlal 1–1 Persepolis; 2026–27 Persian Gulf Pro League (2 September 2026)
- Stadiums: Azadi Stadium

Statistics
- Total meetings: Official matches: 100; Total matches: 107
- Most wins: Officials: Persepolis (29); Total: Persepolis (29)
- Most player appearances: Ali Parvin (20)
- Top scorer: Safar Iranpak (7)
- Largest victory: Persepolis 6–0 Taj

The Tehran derby (Persian: شهرآورد تهران, romanized: Shahrāvard-i Tehrān), also known as Blue-Red derby (Persian: شهرآورد سرخابی, romanized: Shahrāvard-i Sorkhābi), is a football match between the two prominent Tehran clubs Esteghlal and Persepolis.

It is widely considered the major crosstown derby in the Persian Gulf Pro League. This match was declared as the most important derby in Asia and 22nd most important derby in the world in June 2008 by World Soccer magazine. It is considered one of the world's most intense derbies.

== History ==
The first derby match between the teams took place on April 5, 1968, at Amjadieh Stadium, where the game finished as a scoreless draw. At the time, Esteghlal was known as Taj SC. Both clubs were relatively young . The rivalry between Shahin and Taj was transferred to its current stage when the Shahin club had to cease operations due to poor relations with the IFF.

Over time, the rivalry became more heated and club fans began attaining collective identities. By the mid-1970s Persepolis was seen as a working class club, while Taj was viewed as a club close to the ruling establishment and supported by the upper class of Iranian society.

Due to the sensitive nature of the matches, fan violence has occurred several times. In minor cases, fans break chairs or throw garbage at the field, but in some cases, fans have stormed the field of play, physical fights between opposing teams and fans have broken out, and public property has been destroyed.

Ever since 1995, federation officials have invited foreign referees to officiate the game to ease fan and player suspicions of referee bias. This occurred after the events of the 39th derby (see below).

Azadi Stadium has been the stadium where most of the matches took place, but Amjadieh Stadium (now Shiroudi) in Tehran and Sahand Stadium in Tabriz have all hosted the game at least once.

Hassan Rowshan from Esteghlal F.C., at the age of 18 years and 357 days is yet the youngest player ever who has scored a goal in the Tehran derby. He scored the only goal in a 1–0 win against Persepolis F.C. On May 25, 1974. Ali Alipour, at the age of 19 years and 185 days, became the youngest Persepolis F.C. player ever to score in Tehran derby. He scored the only goal in their 1–0 victory on May 15, 2015.

== Notable matches ==
- Persepolis 4 – Taj 1 (February 4, 1972) – This was Persepolis's first win in the derby match, which was also a Goalfull match. First time Persepolis beat its rival with 4 goals.
- Persepolis 6 – Taj 0 (September 7, 1973) – Best ever result in Tehran derby.
- Esteghlal 1 – Persepolis 0 (October 7, 1983) – Iranian television broadcaster IRIB did not air the match so a large number of fans flocked to Azadi Stadium. An estimated 128,000 entered the 100,000-capacity stadium. So many fans were in attendance that some were forced to climb the metal base of the stadium floodlights. None of the derby matches to this date have had a higher attendance and mostly likely never will as the 2002 renovations of the stadium reduced its capacity.
- Esteghlal 2 – Persepolis 2 (January 20, 1995) – In the 39th derby Persepolis was leading in the match by a score of 2–0 until the last 10 minutes of the match. Esteghlal scored 2 goals in quick succession, including one which was a penalty. This angered the Persepolis fans and players who felt the referee was biased towards Esteghlal. Persepolis fans stormed the field, and a number of fights broke out on the pitch between fans and players. After this match it was decided that Iranian referees will no longer be used for the derby.
- Persepolis 3 – Esteghlal 0 (July 11, 1997) – One of the most one-sided derby matches for the two teams. Persepolis dominated the match with scoring 3 goals by Edmond Bezik, Mehdi Mahdavikia and Behnam Taherzadeh. In addition to this 3 goals, Persepolis also hit the post bar for 3 times. Persepolis won Esteghlal 2 times back and forth in this league season and won championship at the end.
- Persepolis 2 – Esteghlal 2 (December 29, 2000) – The game was extremely sensitive as Mehdi Hasheminasab had left Persepolis in the off-season for Esteghlal as Ali Parvin kicked him out because he was scared Hasheminasab would break his record so he left and after leaving Persepolis fans hit Hasheminasab’s mom harshly. Behrouz Rahbarifar opened up the scoring in minute 56, while Mohammad Navazi tied the game up at the 67th minute. Some thought the game would be over when Hasheminasab scored a late goal at minute 86, but Ali Karimi saved Persepolis scoring a goal at minute 89 to please the red fans. During the game Esteghlal's goalkeeper Parviz Broumand and Persepolis striker Payan Rafat were constantly insulting each other. This eventually led to Broumand punching Rafat in the face and giving him a black eye. A massive fight broke out between the players. After the match hooligans went on a rampage. They destroyed 250 city buses and damaged multiple shops. Three players from each side were arrested along with 60 fans for their behavior.

== Statistics ==
=== Head to head ===
As of 5 December 2025, there have been 106 competitive first-class meetings between the two teams since the first league meeting in 1969. In all 99 official competitive meetings since 1968, Esteghlal has won 23 and Persepolis 29.

Tournament	Matches	Wins		Draws	Goals	
Tournament	Matches	Esteghlal	Persepolis	Draws	Esteghlal	Persepolis
Iranian League	78	18	24	36	68	85
Iranian Hazfi Cup	6	1	2	3	7	6
Iranian Super Cup	1	0	1	0	–	–
Tehran Competitions	15	4	2	9	13	9
Total Official Matches	100	23	29	48	88	100
Exhibition games	7	3	0	4	8	5
Grand Total	107	26	29	52	96	105

=== Head-to-head ranking in Iranian Leagues (1970–2025) ===
P.	71	72	74	75	76	77	78	90	92	93	94	95	96	97	98	99	00	01	02	03	04	05	06	07	08	09	10	11	12	13	14	15	16	17	18	19	20	21	22	23	24	25
1	1	1	1	1	1			1					1	1	1	1	1	1	1				1		1	1				1				1	1	1	1	1	1	1	1	
2			2	2		2	2	2	2	2	2	2				2	2	2	2		2							2			2		2	2			2		2		2	
3		3							3				3							3		3		3			3		3				3		3	3		3		3		3
4	4				4	4	4					4										4		4			4	4														
5										5											5					5					5											
6														6																		6										
7																														7												
8																																8										
9																				9																						9
10																																										
11																																										
12																													12													
13																							13		13																	
14																																										
15																																										
16																																										
17																																										
18																																										

• Total: Esteghlal with 16 higher finishes, Persepolis with 24 higher finishes (till end of the 2024–25 Persian Gulf Pro League)

=== Stadiums ===
As of 2 September 2026

Since the first match in 1968, Tehran Derby matches have been held in 6 stadiums, including 4 outside Tehran. The following table shows the details of the stadiums that hosted the Tehran Derby.

- Does not include friendly matches.

Tehran Derby stadiums
Stadium	Results			Notes
Stadium	Esteghlal	Draws	Persepolis	Notes
Shahid Shiroudi Stadium	6	4	3	The home stadium of both teams until 1971, it hosted many Tehran Derby matches. Its primary name was "Amjadieh".
Shahid Shiroudi Stadium	Total: 13			The home stadium of both teams until 1971, it hosted many Tehran Derby matches. Its primary name was "Amjadieh".
Azadi Stadium	17	40	25	The home stadium of both teams since 1971, it hosted more Tehran Derby matches than any other stadium so far. Its primary name was "Aryamehr".
Azadi Stadium	Total: 82			The home stadium of both teams since 1971, it hosted more Tehran Derby matches than any other stadium so far. Its primary name was "Aryamehr".
Azadi Stadium (Bandar Abbas)	0	1	0	The second leg between the two teams in the 1994–95 season was held at this stadium without any fans. because fans stormed the field in the previous game.
Azadi Stadium (Bandar Abbas)	Total: 1			The second leg between the two teams in the 1994–95 season was held at this stadium without any fans. because fans stormed the field in the previous game.
Yadegar-e Emam Stadium (Tabriz)	0	1	0	The home stadium of Tractor, also known as "Sahand". The first leg between the two teams in the 2002–03 season was held at there Because the Azadi pitch was being renovated.
Yadegar-e Emam Stadium (Tabriz)	Total: 1			The home stadium of Tractor, also known as "Sahand". The first leg between the two teams in the 2002–03 season was held at there Because the Azadi pitch was being renovated.
Imam Khomeini Stadium (Arak)	0	1	1	The home stadium of Aluminium. The first legs between the two teams in the 2024–25 and 2025–26 seasons were held at there due to the Azadi seats was under renovation.
Imam Khomeini Stadium (Arak)	Total: 2			The home stadium of Aluminium. The first legs between the two teams in the 2024–25 and 2025–26 seasons were held at there due to the Azadi seats was under renovation.
Naghsh-e Jahan Stadium (Isfahan)	0	1	0	The home stadium of Sepahan. The first leg between the two teams in the 2026–27 season was held at there due to the Azadi pitch and seats was under renovation.
Naghsh-e Jahan Stadium (Isfahan)	Total: 1			The home stadium of Sepahan. The first leg between the two teams in the 2026–27 season was held at there due to the Azadi pitch and seats was under renovation.

== Records ==
Friendly matches are not included in the following records unless otherwise noted.

=== Results ===
==== Biggest wins (+3 goals difference) ====
Winning margin	Home team	Result	Away team	Date	Competition
6	**Persepolis**	6–0	Esteghlal	7 September 1973	Iranian League
3	**Persepolis**	4–1	Esteghlal	4 February 1972	Iranian League
3	Persepolis	0–3	**Esteghlal**	8 May 1977	Iranian League
3	**Persepolis**	3–0	Esteghlal	15 June 1986	Tehran League
3	Esteghlal	0–3	**Persepolis**	11 July 1997	Iranian League
3	Persepolis	0–3	**Esteghlal**	9 December 2011	Hazfi Cup

==== Most goals in a match ====
Goals	Home team	Result	Away team	Date	Competition
6	Persepolis	6–0	Esteghlal	7 September 1973	League
6	Persepolis	4–2	Esteghlal	15 April 2016	League
5	Persepolis	4–1	Esteghlal	4 February 1972	League
5	Esteghlal	3–2	Persepolis	25 February 2005	League
5	Esteghlal	2–3	Persepolis	2 February 2012	League
5	Esteghlal	3–2	Persepolis	12 February 2017	League

==== Most consecutive wins ====
Games	Club	Period
4	Esteghlal	15 October 2010 – 9 December 2011
3	Esteghlal	22 August 1969 – 17 January 1971
3	Persepolis	18 October 1996 – 13 November 1998

==== Most consecutive draws ====
Games	Period
6	30 March 2007 – 2 October 2009

==== Most consecutive without a draw ====
Games	Period
6	3 February 2010 – 2 February 2012

==== Longest unbeaten runs ====
Games	Club	Period
20 (8 wins)	Persepolis	20 September 2018 – 2 September 2026 (ongoing)
10 (6 wins)	Esteghlal	25 May 1990 – 29 December 1995
10 (4 wins)	Persepolis	2 February 2012 – 16 September 2016

==== Most consecutive without conceding a goal ====
Games	Club	Period
4	Esteghlal	24 January 1992 – 1 January 1993
4	Persepolis	29 December 1995 – 13 November 1998
4	Esteghlal	15 October 2010 – 9 December 2011
4	Persepolis	24 August 2012 – 17 January 2014
4	Esteghlal	24 August 2012 – 17 January 2014

==== Most consecutive games scoring ====
Games	Club	Period
13	Esteghlal	3 November 2006 – 2 February 2012
8	Persepolis	3 November 2006 – 3 February 2010

=== Players ===
==== Goal scorers ====
- Does not include friendly matches.
- Players in **bold** are still active for Esteghlal or Persepolis.

Safar Iranpak (left), Hossein Kalani (right) who are top scorers in derbies and Homayoun Behzadi (seated) the first hat-trick scorer of a derby.

Pos.	Player	Club(s)	League	Cup	Region	Total
1	(Iran) Safar Iranpak	Persepolis	6	–	1	7
2	(Iran) Hossein Kalani	Persepolis	5	–	–	5
2	(Iran) Ali Jabbari	Esteghlal	2	–	3	5
2	(Iran) Gholam Hossein Mazloumi	Esteghlal	3	–	2	5
2	(Iran) Mehdi Hasheminasab	Persepolis Esteghlal	3 1	1 –	–	5
2	(Iran) **Ali Alipour**	Persepolis	4	1	–	5
7	(Iran) Homayoun Behzadi	Persepolis	4	–	–	4
7	(Iran) Farhad Majidi	Esteghlal	4	–	–	4
7	(Iran) Amir Arsalan Motahari	Esteghlal	4	–	–	4
7	(Iran) Mojtaba Jabbari	Esteghlal	2	2	–	4
11	(Iran) Hassan Rowshan	Esteghlal	3	–	–	3
11	(Iran) Shahrokh Bayani	Persepolis Esteghlal	–	–	2 1	3
11	(Iran) Farshad Pious	Persepolis	1	–	2	3
11	(Iran) Samad Marfavi	Esteghlal	3	–	–	3
11	(Iran) Sadegh Varmazyar	Esteghlal	3	–	–	3
11	(Libya) Éamon Zayed	Persepolis	3	–	–	3
11	(Iran) Omid Alishah	Persepolis	2	1	–	3
18	(Iran) Iraj Soleimani	Persepolis	2	–	–	2
18	(Iran) Esmaeil Haj Rahimipour	Persepolis	2	–	–	2
18	(Iran) Masoud Mojdehi	Esteghlal	2	–	–	2
18	(Iran) Mahmoud Khordbin	Persepolis	2	–	–	2
18	(Iran) Edmond Akhtar	Esteghlal	2	–	–	2
18	(Iran) Edmond Bezik	Persepolis	2	–	–	2
18	(Iran) Mohammad Navazi	Esteghlal	2	–	–	2
18	(Iran) Alireza Akbarpour	Esteghlal	2	–	–	2
18	(Iran) Ali Samereh	Esteghlal	2	–	–	2
18	(Iran) Mahmoud Fekri	Esteghlal	2	–	–	2
18	(Iran) Reza Enayati	Esteghlal	2	–	–	2
18	(Iran) Omid Ravankhah	Esteghlal	2	–	–	2
18	(Iran) Mohsen Khalili	Persepolis	2	–	–	2
18	(Iran) Ali Karimi	Persepolis	2	–	–	2
18	(Iran) Arash Borhani	Esteghlal	2	–	–	2
18	(Iran) Mehdi Taremi	Persepolis	2	–	–	2
18	(Iran) Jaber Ansari	Esteghlal	2	–	–	2
18	(Iran) Mehdi Abdi	Persepolis	2	–	–	2
18	(Georgia (country)) Giorgi Gvelesiani	Persepolis	2	–	–	2
18	(Iran) Issa Alekasir	Persepolis	2	–	–	2
18	(Iran) **Hossein Kanaanizadegan**	Persepolis	2	–	–	2
18	(Iraq) Bashar Resan	Persepolis	1	1	–	2
18	(Iran) Mehdi Ghayedi	Esteghlal	1	1	–	2
41	(Iran) Ahmad Monshizadeh	Esteghlal	–	–	1	1
41	(Iran) Nazem Ganjapour	Persepolis	–	–	1	1
41	(Iran) Karo Haghverdian	Esteghlal	–	–	1	1
41	(Iran) Abbas Mojdehi	Esteghlal	1	–	–	1
41	(Iran) Jahangir Fattahi	Persepolis	1	–	–	1
41	(Iran) Hadi Naraghi	Esteghlal	1	–	–	1
41	(Iran) Ali Parvin	Persepolis	1	–	–	1
41	(Iran) Moharam Asheri	Esteghlal	1	–	–	1
41	(Iran) Saeid Maragehchian	Esteghlal	1	–	–	1
41	(Iran) Gholamreza Fathabadi	Persepolis	–	–	1	1
41	(Iran) Behtash Fariba	Esteghlal	–	–	1	1
41	(Iran) Parviz Mazloumi	Esteghlal	–	–	1	1
41	(Iran) Nasser Mohammadkhani	Persepolis	–	–	1	1
41	(Iran) Jafar Mokhtarifar	Esteghlal	–	–	1	1
41	(Iran) Reza Abedian	Persepolis	–	–	1	1
41	(Iran) Nader Mirahmadian	Persepolis	1	–	–	1
41	(Iran) Abbas Sarkhab	Esteghlal	1	–	–	1
41	(Iran) Behzad Dadashzadeh	Persepolis	1	–	–	1
41	(Iran) Mohammad Taghavi	Esteghlal	1	–	–	1
41	(Iran) Morteza Kermani Moghaddam	Persepolis	1	–	–	1
41	(Iran) Mehdi Mahdavikia	Persepolis	1	–	–	1
41	(Iran) Behnam Taherzadeh	Persepolis	1	–	–	1
41	(Iran) Fred Malekian	Esteghlal	1	–	–	1
41	(Iran) Payan Rafat	Persepolis	1	–	–	1
41	(Iran) Behrouz Rahbarifar	Persepolis	1	–	–	1
41	(Iran) Reza Jabbari	Persepolis	1	–	–	1
41	(Iran) Ali Ansarian	Persepolis	1	–	–	1
41	(Iran) Yahya Golmohammadi	Persepolis	1	–	–	1
41	(Iran) Behnam Abolghasempour	Persepolis	1	–	–	1
41	(Mali) Issa Traore	Persepolis	1	–	–	1
41	(Iran) Davoud Seyed Abbasi	Esteghlal	1	–	–	1
41	(Iran) Hamed Kavianpour	Persepolis	1	–	–	1
41	(Iran) Sheys Rezaei	Persepolis	1	–	–	1
41	(Iran) Sohrab Entezari	Persepolis	1	–	–	1
41	(Iran) Pirouz Ghorbani	Esteghlal	1	–	–	1
41	(Iran) Amir Hossein Sadeghi	Esteghlal	1	–	–	1
41	(Iran) Mehrzad Madanchi	Persepolis	1	–	–	1
41	(Iran) Mehrdad Oladi	Persepolis	1	–	–	1
41	(Iran) Alireza Vahedi Nikbakht	Persepolis	1	–	–	1
41	(Iran) Ali Alizadeh	Esteghlal	1	–	–	1
41	(Iran) Maziar Zare	Persepolis	1	–	–	1
41	(Iran) Adel Kolahkaj	Persepolis	1	–	–	1
41	(Iran) Hadi Norouzi	Persepolis	1	–	–	1
41	(Iran) Karim Bagheri	Persepolis	1	–	–	1
41	(Iran) Milad Meydavoudi	Esteghlal	1	–	–	1
41	(Iran) Ferydoon Zandi	Esteghlal	1	–	–	1
41	(Iran) Sajjad Shahbazzadeh	Esteghlal	1	–	–	1
41	(Iran) Mohammad Nouri	Persepolis	1	–	–	1
41	(Honduras) Jerry Bengtson	Persepolis	1	–	–	1
41	(Iran) Ramin Rezaeian	Persepolis	1	–	–	1
41	(Iran) Mohsen Mosalman	Persepolis	1	–	–	1
41	(Iran) Omid Ebrahimi	Esteghlal	1	–	–	1
41	(Iran) Soroush Rafiei	Persepolis	1	–	–	1
41	(Iran) Farshid Esmaeili	Esteghlal	1	–	–	1
41	(Iran) (Azerbaijan) Ali Ghorbani	Esteghlal	1	–	–	1
41	(Iran) Kaveh Rezaei	Esteghlal	1	–	–	1
41	(Iran) Jalal Hosseini	Persepolis	1	–	–	1
41	(Iran) Vouria Ghafouri	Esteghlal	1	–	–	1
41	(Iran) Ahmad Nourollahi	Persepolis	1	–	–	1
41	(Iran) Vahid Amiri	Persepolis	1	–	–	1
41	(Iran) Ali Nemati	Persepolis	1	–	–	1
41	(Benin) Rudy Gestede	Esteghlal	1	–	–	1
41	(Iran) **Rouzbeh Cheshmi**	Esteghlal	1	–	–	1
41	(France) Arthur Yamga	Esteghlal	1	–	–	1
41	(Iran) **Alireza Koushki**	Esteghlal	1	–	–	1
41	(Iran) **Mohammad Mehdi Mohebi**	Persepolis	1	–	–	1
41	(Albania) **Jasir Asani**	Esteghlal	1	–	–	1
41	(Iran) Sohrab Bakhtiarizadeh	Esteghlal	–	1	–	1
41	(Iran) Afshin Peyrovani	Persepolis	–	1	–	1
41	(Iran) Esmaeil Sharifat	Esteghlal	–	1	–	1
41	(Iran) Mohammad Daneshgar	Esteghlal	–	1	–	1
41	(Iran) Mahdi Torabi	Persepolis	–	1	–	1
41	(Iran) Mohammad Hossein Moradmand	Esteghlal	–	1	–	1

==== Top scorers by competition ====
Competition	Player	Club(s)	Goals	Total
Iranian League	(Iran) Safar Iranpak	Persepolis	6	6
Iranian Hazfi Cup	(Iran) Mojtaba Jabbari	Esteghlal	2	2
Tehran Province League	(Iran) Ali Jabbari	Esteghlal	3	3
Tehran Province League	(Iran) Shahrokh Bayani	Persepolis Esteghlal	2 1	3

==== Most consecutive goalscoring ====
Player	Club	Consecutive matches	Total goals in the run	Start	End
(Iran) Safar Iranpak	Persepolis	3		1970–71 Tehran Province League	1971–72 Local League (second leg)
(Iran) Mehdi Hasheminasab	Persepolis	3		1998–99 Azadegan League (first leg)	1998–99 Hazfi Cup (final)
(Iran) Farhad Majidi	Esteghlal	3		2009–10 Persian Gulf Cup (first leg)	2010–11 Persian Gulf Cup (first leg)

==== Most appearances ====
- Players in **bold** are still active for Esteghlal or Persepolis.

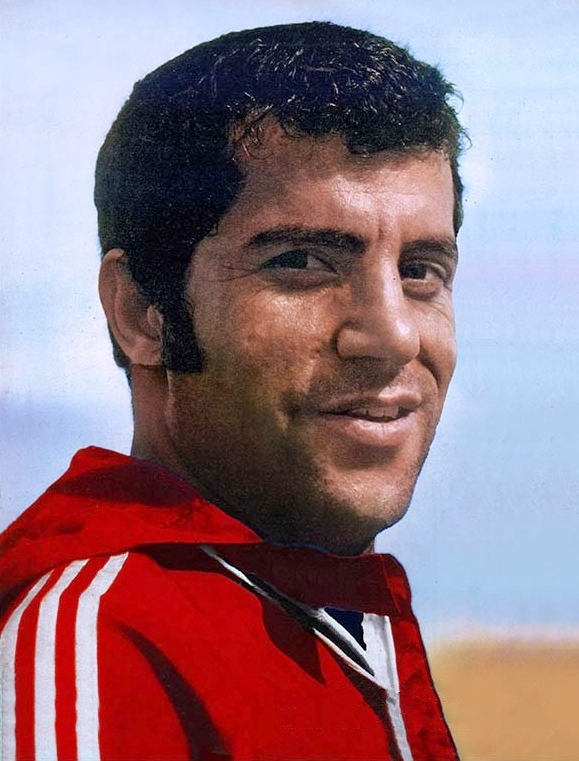
Ali Parvin, has the most appearances in derbies.

Apps	Player	Club
20	(Iran) Ali Parvin	Persepolis
19	(Iran) Alireza Vahedi Nikbakht	Both
18	(Iran) Afshin Peyrovani	Persepolis
18	(Iran) Mahmoud Fekri	Esteghlal
18	(Iran) Amir Hossein Sadeghi	Esteghlal
18	(Iran) Omid Alishah	Persepolis
17	(Iran) Ali Jabbari	Esteghlal
17	(Iran) Karo Haghverdian	Esteghlal
16	(Iran) Asghar Adibi	Persepolis
16	(Iran) Ebrahim Ashtiani	Persepolis
16	(Iran) Akbar Kargarjam	Esteghlal
16	(Iran) Nasser Hejazi	Esteghlal
16	(Iran) Javad Zarrincheh	Esteghlal
16	(Iran) Behrouz Rahbarifar	Persepolis
16	(Iran) Vahid Amiri	Persepolis
16	(Iran) **Ali Alipour**	Persepolis

==== Most clean sheets ====
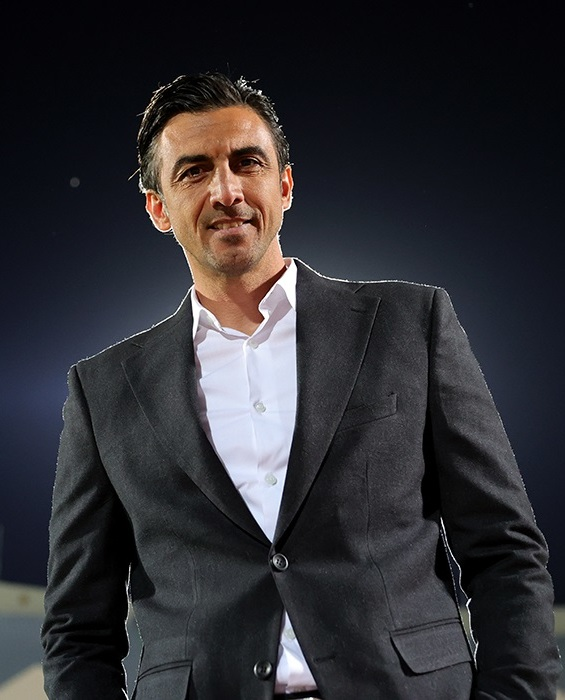
Mehdi Rahmati, has the most clean sheets in derbies.

Player	Club(s)	Period	CS	Total
(Iran) Mehdi Rahmati	Esteghlal	2005–07, 2011–14, 2015–19	9	9
(Iran) Ahmad Reza Abedzadeh	Esteghlal Persepolis	1990–93 1994–2001	3 5	8
(Iran) Alireza Beiranvand	Persepolis	2016–20, 2022–24	7	7
(Iran) Nasser Hejazi	Esteghlal	1969–76, 1980–86	5	5
(Iran) Vahid Ghelich	Persepolis	1980–92	5	5
(Brazil) Nilson	Persepolis	2012–15	4	4

==== Most consecutive clean sheets ====
Player	Club(s)	Consecutive matches	Start	End
(Iran) Ahmad Reza Abedzadeh	Persepolis	4	1995–96 Azadegan League (second leg)	1998–99 Azadegan League (first leg)
(Brazil) Nilson	Persepolis	4	2012–13 Persian Gulf Cup (first leg)	2013–14 Persian Gulf Cup (second leg)
(Iran) Mehdi Rahmati	Esteghlal	4	2012–13 Persian Gulf Cup (first leg)	2013–14 Persian Gulf Cup (second leg)

=== Hat-tricks ===
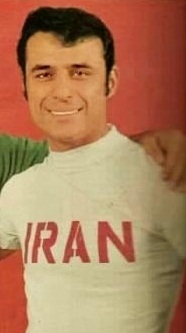
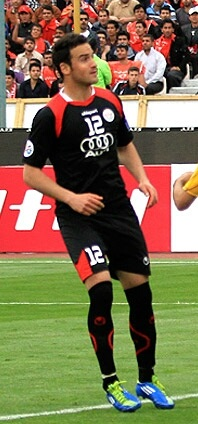
Homayoun Behzadi (left) and Éamon Zayed (right)

A hat-trick is achieved when the same player scores three goals in one match. Listed in chronological order.

Seq.	Player	Time of goals	For	Final score	Date	Tournament
1.	(Iran) Homayoun Behzadi	50', 86', 90+2'	Persepolis	6–0 (H)	7 September 1973	1973–74 Takht Jamshid Cup
2.	(Libya) Éamon Zayed	82', 83', 90+2'	Persepolis	3–2 (H)	2 February 2012	2011–12 Persian Gulf Cup

=== Braces ===
- Does not include friendly matches.

A Brace is achieved when the same player scores two goals in one match. Listed in chronological order.

Seq.	Player	Time of goals	For	Final score	Date	Tournament
1.	(Iran) Hossein Kalani	43', 90'	Persepolis	4–1 (H)	4 February 1972	1971–72 Local League
2.	(Iran) Ali Jabbari	40', 87'	Esteghlal	2–0 (A)	2 March 1973	1972–73 Tehran Province League
3.	(Iran) Iraj Soleimani	45', 56'	Persepolis	6–0 (H)	7 September 1973	1973–74 Takht Jamshid Cup
4.	(Iran) Gholam Hossein Mazloumi	11', 62'	Esteghlal	3–1 (H)	5 May 1975	1975–76 Takht Jamshid Cup
5.	(Iran) Safar Iranpak	15', 34'	Persepolis	2–1 (A)	9 December 1977	1977–78 Takht Jamshid Cup
6.	(Iran) Shahrokh Bayani	12', 52'	Persepolis	3–0 (H)	15 July 1986	1986–87 Tehran Province League
7.	(Iran) Mojtaba Jabbari	95', 99'	Esteghlal	3–0 (A)	9 December 2011	2011–12 Hazfi Cup
8.	(Iran) Mehdi Taremi	5', 35'	Persepolis	4–2 (H)	15 April 2016	2015–16 Persian Gulf Pro League
9.	(Iran) Amir Arsalan Motahari	24', 52'	Esteghlal	2–2 (A)	6 February 2020	2019–20 Persian Gulf Pro League
10.	(Georgia (country)) Giorgi Gvelesiani	16', 89'	Persepolis	2–2 (A)	20 December 2022	2022–23 Persian Gulf Pro League

=== Most successful coaches in derbies ===
Friendly matches are not included in the following records unless otherwise noted.

Rank	Head coach	Club	Matches	Win	Lost	Win-Loss Differential	Winning rate
1	(Croatia) Branko Ivanković	Persepolis	10	5	2	+3	50%
2	(Iran) Yahya Golmohammadi	Persepolis	12	3	0	+3	25%
3	(Iran) Mansour Pourheidari	Esteghlal	18	6	4	+2	33%
4	(England) Alan Rogers	Persepolis	7	4	2	+2	57%
5	(Iran) Parviz Mazloumi	Esteghlal	8	4	2	+2	50%
6	(Iran) Ali Danaeifard	Esteghlal	3	2	0	+2	66%
7	(Turkey) Mustafa Denizli	Persepolis	3	2	0	+2	66%
8	(Iran) Amir Ghalenoei	Esteghlal	14	3	2	+1	21%
9	(Iran) Hamid Derakhshan	Persepolis	3	2	1	+1	66%

Rules for classification: 1) Win-Loss Differential; 2) Number of Wins; 3) Winning rate; 4) Aggregate Goal Difference.

== General performances ==
=== Trophies ===
- Numbers with this background indicate the record in the competition.

Esteghlal	Competition	Persepolis
Regional
13	Tehran Province League	6
4	Tehran Province Hazfi Cup	2
—	Tehran Tournament	1
—	Espandi Cup	1
1	Tehran Super Cup	—
18	Regional aggregate	10
National
9	Iranian League	16
8	Iranian Hazfi Cup	7
1	Iranian Super Cup	5
1	Iran Championship Cup	—
19	National aggregate	28
Continental
2	Asian Club Championship	—
—	Asian Cup Winners' Cup	1
2	Continental aggregate	1
39	Total aggregate	39

=== General information ===
Titles	Esteghlal	Persepolis
Club name after establishment	Docharkhe Savaran Sport Club	Persepolis Sport Club
Founding date	26 September 1945	Club: 22 November 1963; Football team: 21 March 1968
Stadium	Azadi Stadium	
Capacity	78,116	
Number of seasons in Iranian League	41 (1 relegated)	41 (1 withdrew due to national commitments)
Most goals scored in a season in Iranian League	70 (2008–09)	56 (1971–72, 1998–99)
Most points in a season in Iranian League	68 (2021–22)	68 (2023–24)
National Double wins (Iranian League and Iranian Hazfi Cup)	—	3 (Note: 1998–99, 2018–19, 2022–23)
Regional Double wins (Tehran Province League and Tehran Hazfi Cup)	1 (Note: 1959–60)	2 (Note: 1982–83, 1986–87)
Domestic Double Wins (National Competitions and Regional Competitions)	2 (Note: 1957–58, 1970–71)	1 (Note: 1987–88)
International/Domestic Double wins (Asian Cup Winners Cup and Tehran Province League)	—	1 (Note: 1990–91)
Most Consecutive Iranian League trophies	—	5 times in a row (Glut) (Note: 2016–17, 2017–18, 2018–19, 2019–20, 2020–21)
Most Consecutive Iranian Hazfi Cup trophies	—	2 times in a row (Brace) (Note: 2009–10, 2010–11)
Most Consecutive Tehran League trophies	4 times in a row (Poker) (Note: 1956–57, 1957–58, 1959–60, 1960–61)	5 times in a row (Glut) (Note: 1986–87, 1987–88, 1988–89, 1989–90, 1990–91)

=== Awards ===
==== IFFHS award ====
The IFFHS Asian Player of the Year is an annual prize presented by International Federation of Football History & Statistics (IFFHS). It had originally been the predecessor of the AFC Player of the Year, but was revived in 2020.

Award	Esteghlal	Persepolis
1st	0	0
2nd	0	1 (Note: Farshad Pious (1990))
3rd	2 (Note: Samad Marfavi (1991), Mehdi Fonounizadeh (1992))	0
Total	2	1

==== AFC award ====
The AFC Player of the Year is an annual prize presented by Asian Football Confederation (AFC). It is awarded to the Asian player who has the best performance at AFC club(s) in a calendar year.

Award	Esteghlal	Persepolis
1st	0	0
2nd	0	2 (Note: Ali Karimi (2012), Alireza Beiranvand (2019))
3rd	2 (Note: Farhad Majidi (2010), Javad Nekounam (2013))	0
Total	2	2

==== Best Footballer in Asia ====
Best Footballer in Asia is an annual association football award organized and presented by Titan Sports. It is awarded to the player who had the best performance for Asian football during the calendar year.

Award	Esteghlal	Persepolis
1st	0	0
2nd	0	0
3rd	0	1 (Note: Alireza Beiranvand (2018))
Total	0	1

==== Iranian Leagues performances awards ====
Award	Esteghlal	Persepolis
Golden Boot	7 (Note: Gholam Hossein Mazloumi (1973–74, 1974–75), Ali Samereh (2000–01), Reza Enayati (2004–05, 2005–06), Arash Borhani (2008–09), Cheick Diabaté (2019–20))	10 (Note: Hossein Kalani (1970–71, 1971–72), Safar Iranpak (1971–72), Farshad Pious (1991–92, 1994–95), Ali Daei (2003–04), Mohsen Khalili (2007–08), Mehdi Taremi (2015–16, 2016–17), Ali Alipour (2017–18))

== Players who played for both clubs ==
Over the years, a number of players have played for both of the heavily supported clubs. Switching sides often angers fans, and players who have done so are heavily booed and mocked in and out of the stadium. When Mehdi Hasheminasab joined Esteghlal, Persepolis fans booed and swore at him so loudly that he covered his face with his hands to hide his tears.

Esteghlal to Persepolis

- (Iran) Ahmadreza Abedzadeh
- (Iran) Reza Ahadi
- (Iran) Ali Akbarian
- (Iran) Javad Allahverdi
- (Iran) Saeid Azizian
- (Mali) Cheick Diabaté
- (Iran) Akbar Eftekhari
- (Iran) Faraz Fatemi
- (Iran) Parviz Ghelichkhani
- (Iran) Farzad Hatami
- (Iran) Meysam Hosseini
- (Iran) Abolfazl Jalali
- (Iran) Mahmoud Kalhor
- (Iran) Mohammad Reza Mahdavi
- (Iran) Saeid Mehri
- (Iran) Dariush Mostafavi
- (Iran) Amir Mousavinia
- (Iran) Majid Namjoo-Motlagh
- (Iran) Mehrdad Pouladi
- (Iran) Masoud Rigi
- (Iran) Mehdi Salehpour
- (Iran) Davoud Seyed Abbasi
- (Iran) Mehdi Seyed-Salehi
- (Iran) Mehdi Shiri

Persepolis to Esteghlal

- (Iran) Ali Alizadeh
- (Iran) Ali Ansarian
- (Iran) Farzad Ashoubi
- (Iran) Behzad Dadashzadeh
- (Cameroon) Jacques Elong Elong
- (Iran) Mohammad Ghazi
- (Iran) Mehdi Hasheminasab
- (Nigeria) Godwin Mensha
- (Iran) Mohammad Mohammadi
- (Iraq) Hawar Mulla Mohammed
- (Iran) Mohammad Naderi
- (Iran) Pejman Nouri
- (Iran) Mehrdad Oladi
- (Iran) Arman Ramezani
- (Iran) Ramin Rezaeian
- (Iran) Ebrahim Taghipour

Esteghlal to Persepolis, then Esteghlal

- (Iran) Maysam Baou
- (Iran) Shahrokh Bayani
- (Iran) Gholamreza Fathabadi
- (Iran) Alireza Vahedi Nikbakht

Persepolis to Esteghlal, then Persepolis

- (Iran) Hossein Kanaanizadegan

== Referees ==
=== IPL referees ===
Season	Leg 1	Leg 2
2001–02	(Italy) Pasquale Rodomonti	(Portugal) Paulo Costa
2002–03	(Italy) Roberto Rosetti	(Slovakia) Vladimír Hriňák
2003–04	(Portugal) Paulo Costa	(Turkey) Mustafa Çulcu
2004–05	(Germany) Florian Meyer	(Russia) Valentin Ivanov
2005–06	(Germany) Wolfgang Stark	(Kuwait) Saad Kamil Al-Fadhli
2006–07	(Spain) Alfonso Pérez Burrull	(Germany) Felix Brych
2007–08	(Spain) Eduardo Iturralde González	(Spain) Bernardino González Vázquez
2008–09	(Kuwait) Saad Kamil Al-Fadhli	(Iran) Mohsen Torky
2009–10	(Iran) Mohsen Torky	(Iran) Saeid Mozaffari Zadeh
2010–11	(Iran) Masoud Moradi	(Iran) Mohsen Torky
2011–12	(Iran) Mohsen Torky	(Iran) Alireza Faghani
2012–13	(Iran) Mohsen Torky	(Iran) Mohsen Ghahremani
2013–14	(Iran) Alireza Faghani	(Iran) Saeid Mozaffari Zadeh
2014–15	(Iran) Yadollah Jahanbazi	(Iran) Touraj Haghverdi
2015–16	(Iran) Mohsen Torky	(Iran) Mohsen Torky
2016–17	(Iran) Alireza Faghani	(Iran) Alireza Faghani
2017–18	(Iran) Bijan Heydari	(Iran) Alireza Faghani
2018–19	(Iran) Alireza Faghani	(Iran) Ashkan Khorshidi
2019–20	(Iran) Mooud Bonyadifar	(Iran) Bijan Heydari
2020–21	(Iran) Reza Kermanshahi	(Iran) Mohammad Reza Akbarian
2021–22	(Iran) Mooud Bonyadifar	(Iran) Mehdi Seyedali
2022–23	(Iran) Mohammad Hossein Zahedifard	(Iran) Payam Heydari
2023–24	(Iran) Mooud Bonyadifar	(Iran) Vahid Kazemi
2024–25	(Iran) Bijan Heydari	(Iran) Payam Heydari
2025–26	(Iran) Vahid Kazemi	

Rank	Referees	Matches
1	(Iran) Mohsen Torky	7
2	(Iran) Alireza Faghani	6
3	(Iran) Mooud Bonyadifar	3
3	(Iran) Bijan Heydari	3
5	(Iran) Saeid Mozaffari Zadeh	2
5	(Iran) Payam Heydari	2
5	(Iran) Vahid Kazemi	2

=== Other notable referees ===
- (Germany) Markus Merk
- (South Korea) Kim Young-Joo
- (Hungary) Sándor Puhl
- (Syria) Jamal Al Sharif
- (Saudi Arabia) Omer Al Mehannah
- (Saudi Arabia) Abdul Rahman Al-Zeid
- (Switzerland) Rudolf Scheurer
- (England) Jack Taylor

== Gallery ==
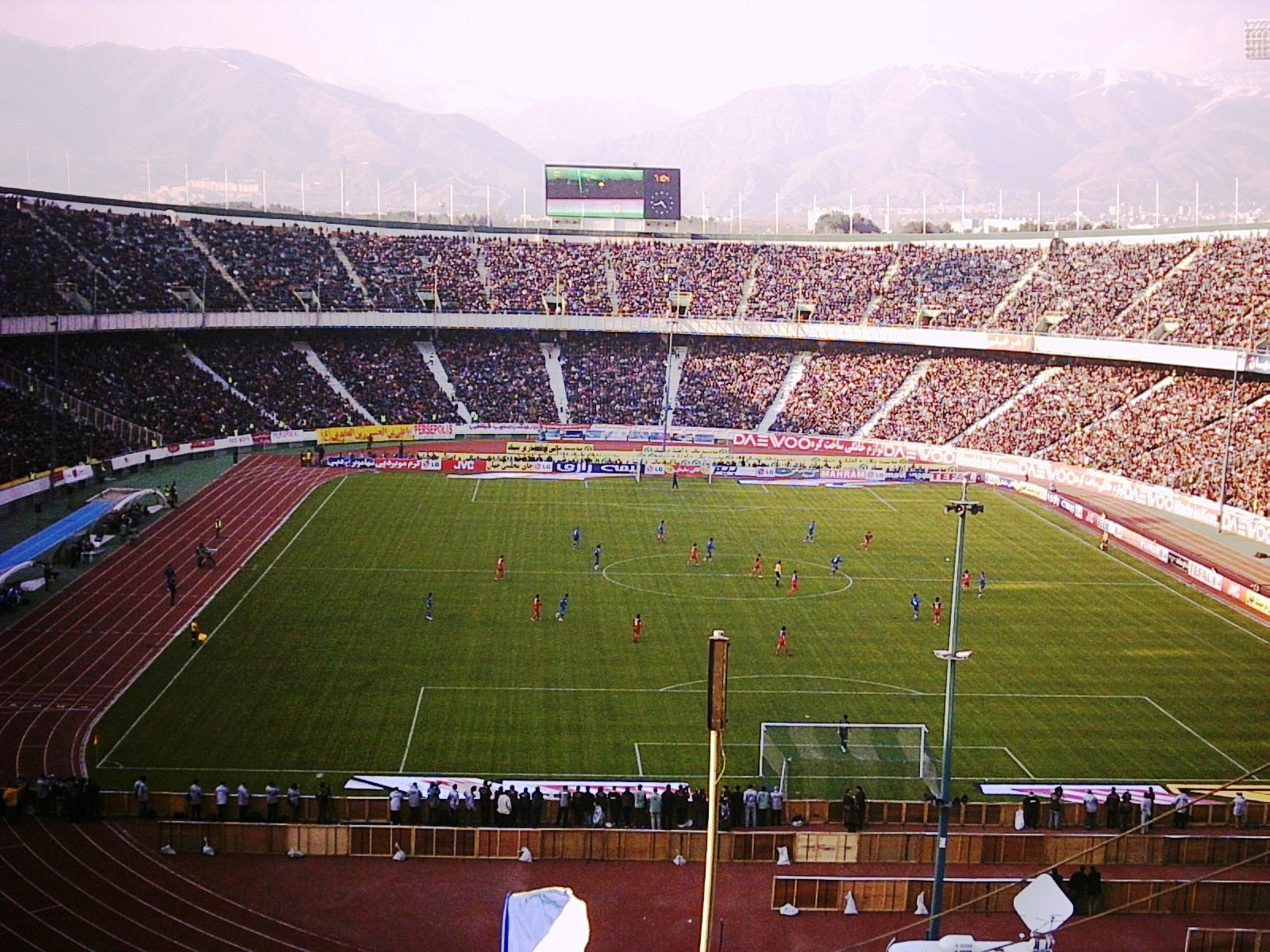

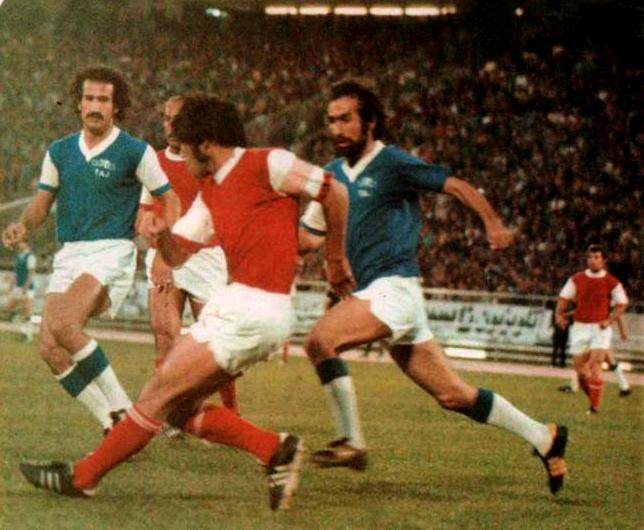

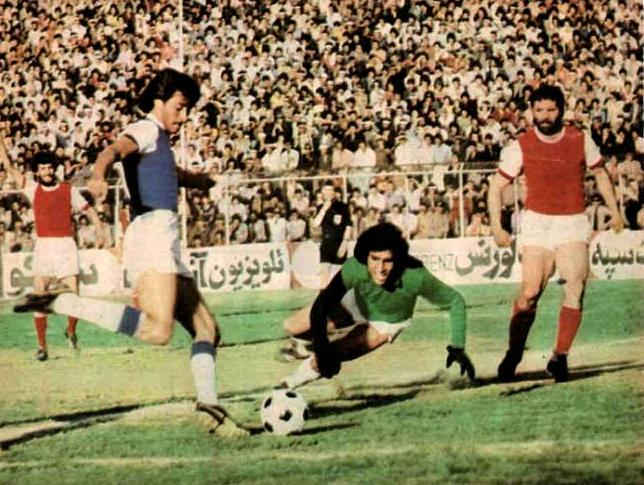

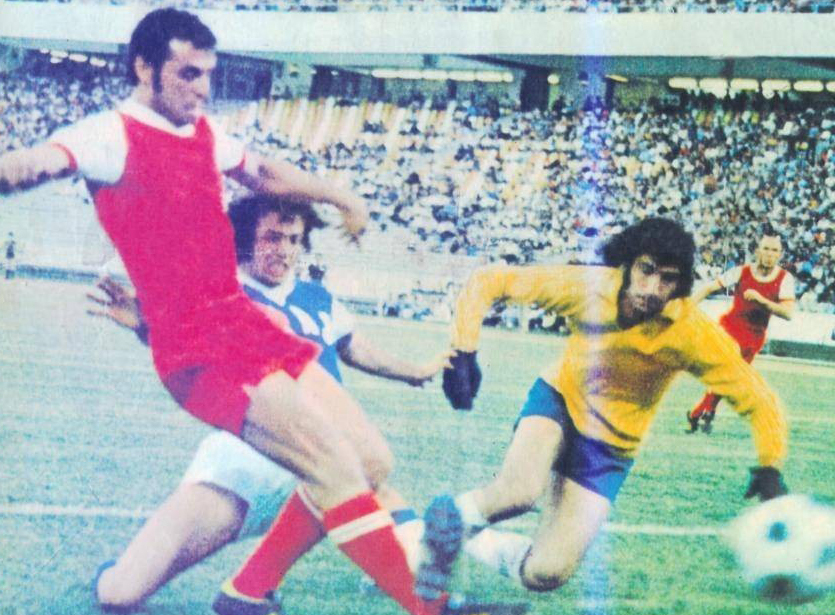

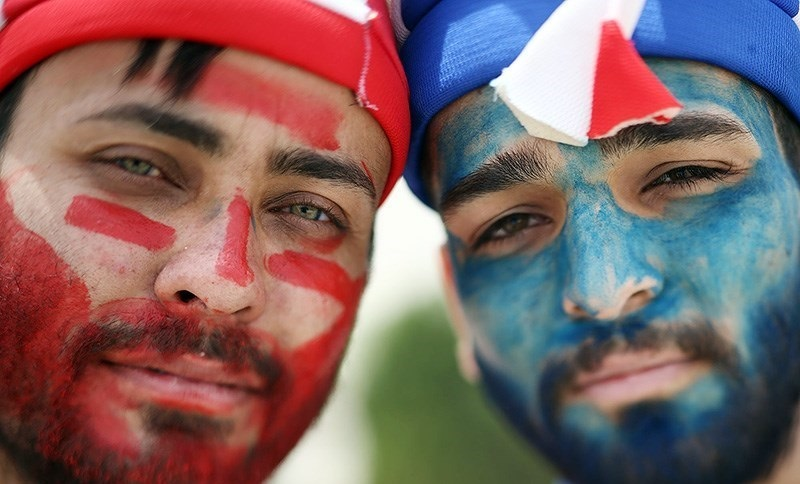

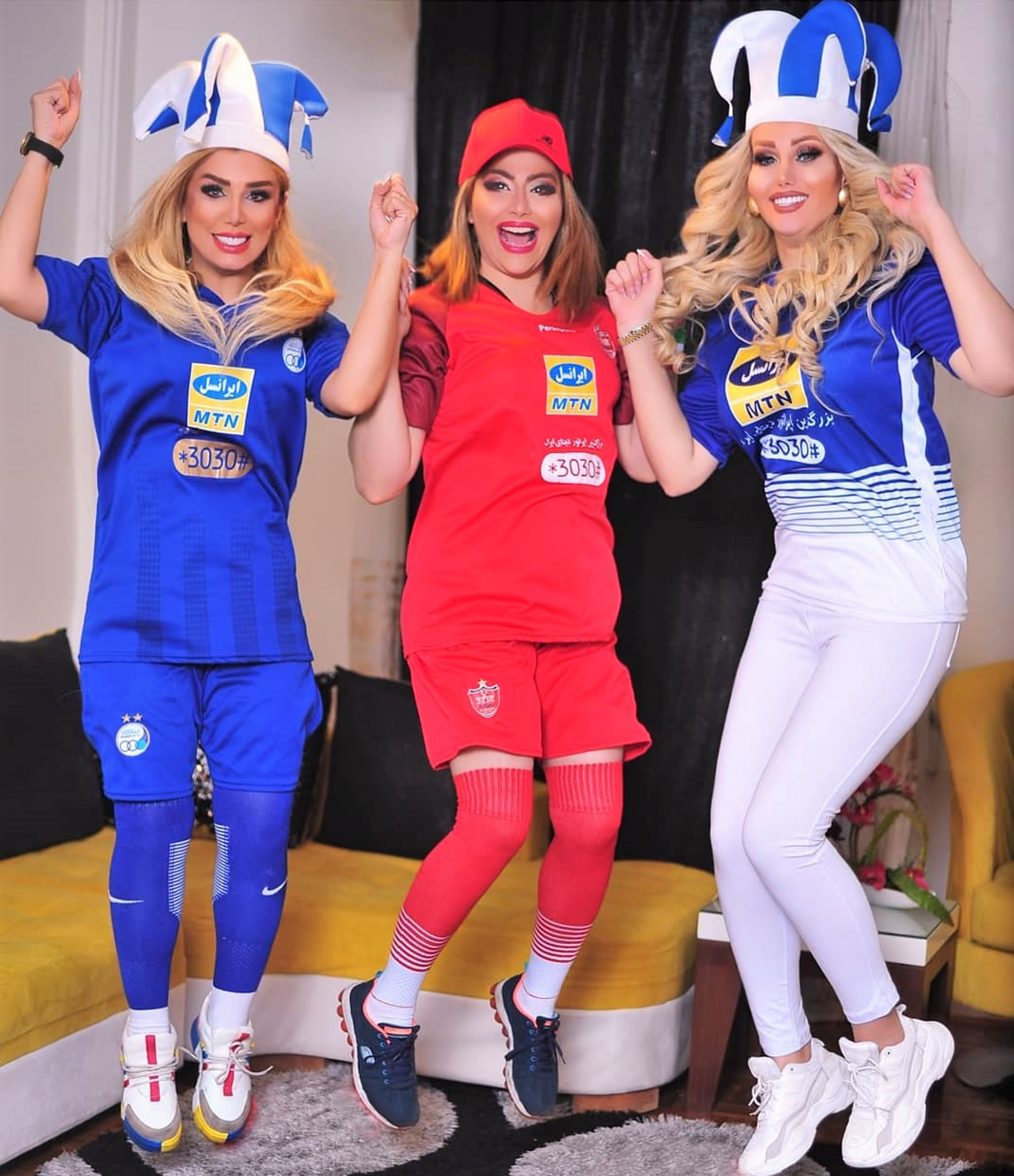

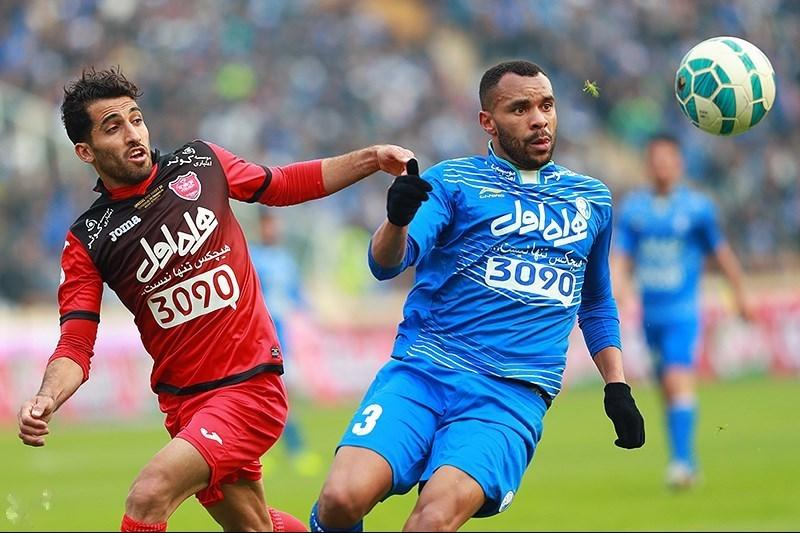

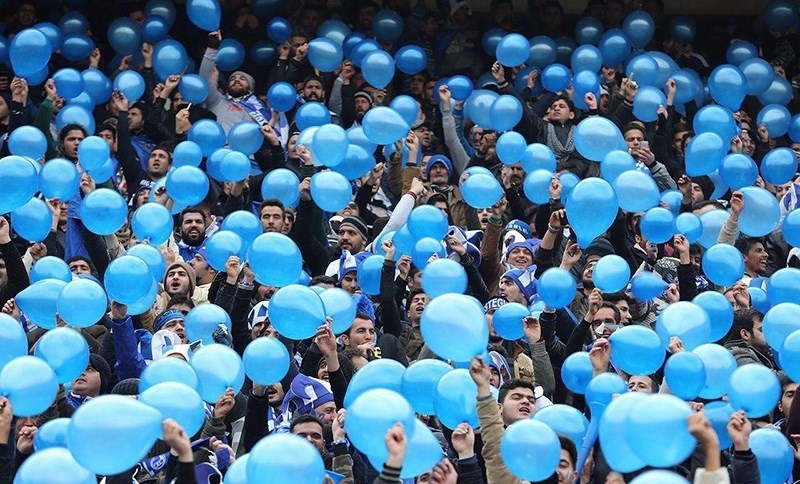

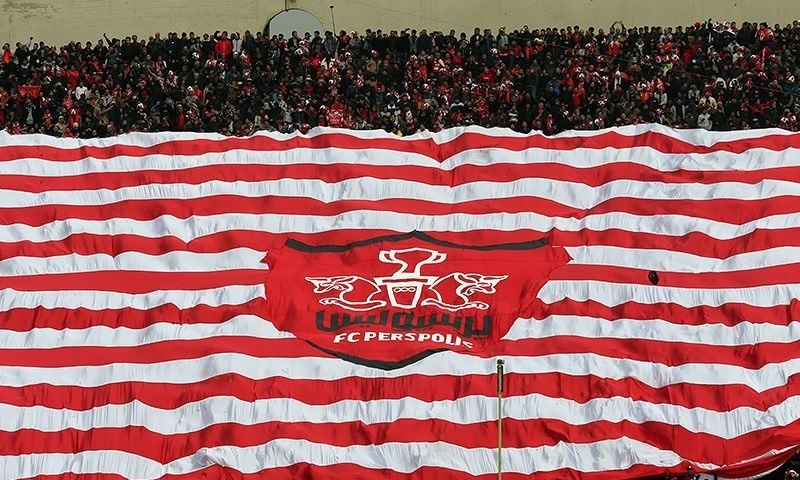

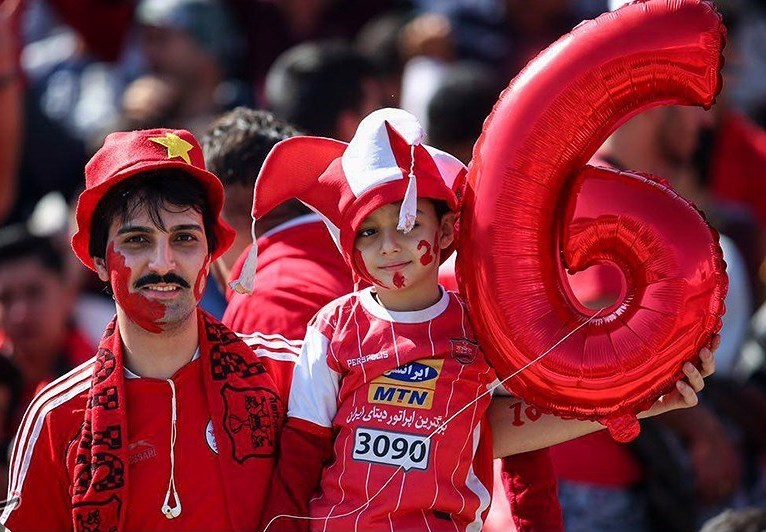

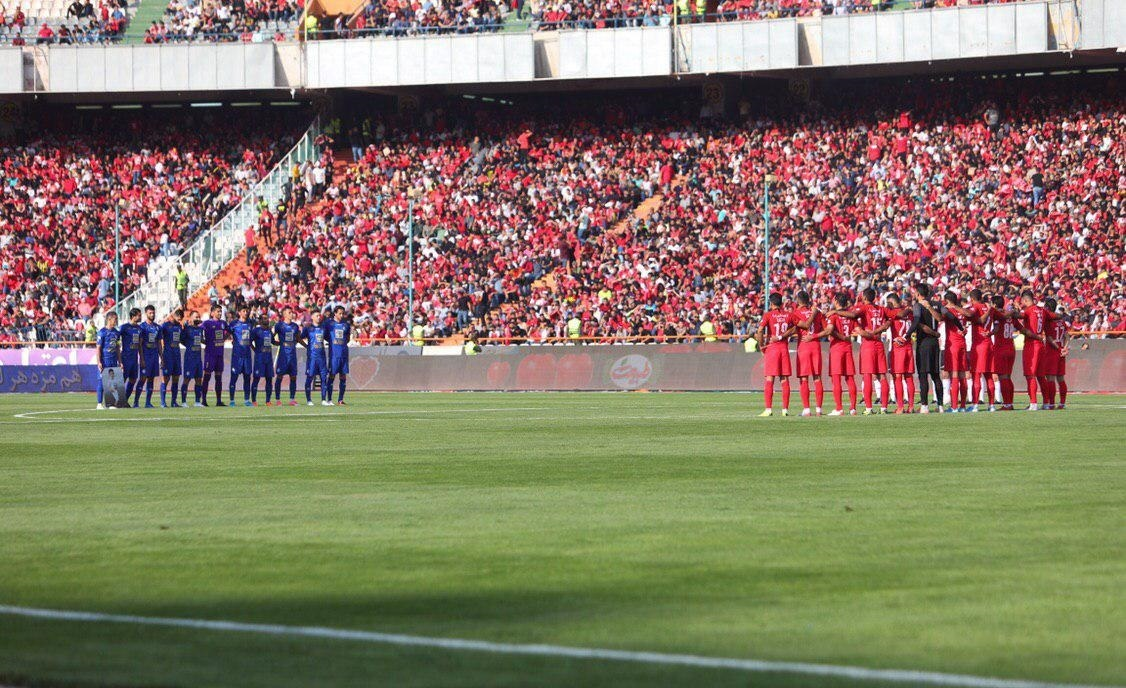

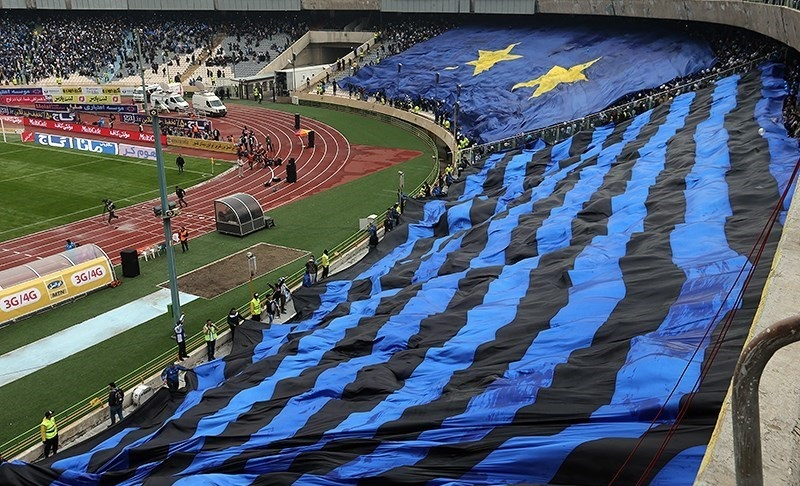

== See also ==
- List of Tehran Derby matches
