= List of Persepolis F.C. statistics and records =

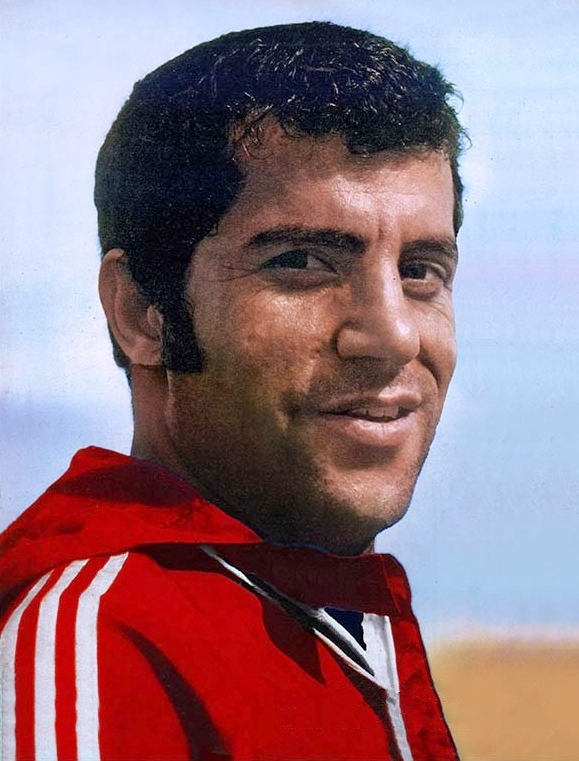
Ali Parvin, pictured here, holds the records for most appearances with the club, with 341.

Persepolis Football Club is an Iranian professional association football club based in Tehran. The club was formed in 1963 and played its first competitive match against Rah Ahan F.C. Persepolis currently plays in the Persian Gulf Pro League. Persepolis is the only club, never to have been relegated from the league. They have also been involved in Asian football, winning the Asian Cup Winners' Cup.

This list encompasses the major honours won by Persepolis and records set by the club, their managers and their players. The player records section includes details of the club's leading goalscorers and those who have made most appearances in first-team competitions. It also records the highest transfer fees paid and received by the club.

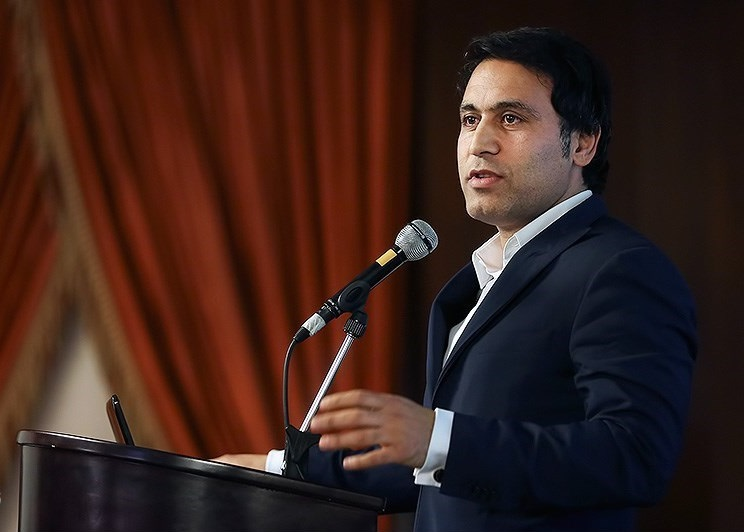
Mehdi Mahdavikia, the club's youngest first team player (aged 17 years and 206 days).

This page details Persepolis Football Club records.

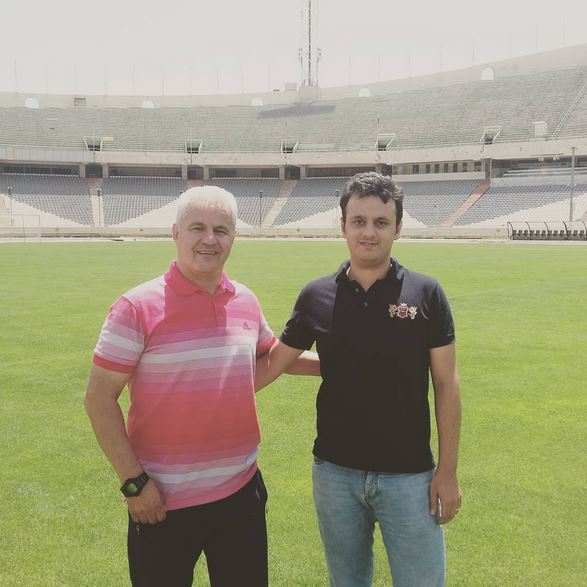
Farshad Pious, pictured here, is the all-time top goalscorer for the club, with 153 goals.

== Statistics ==
=== Statistics in IPL ===
- Seasons in IPL: 26 (all)
- Best position in IPL: First (2001–02), (2007–08), (2016–17), (2017–18), (2018–19), (2019–20), (2020–21), (2022–23), (2023–24)
- Worst position in IPL: 12 (2011–12)
- Most goals scored in a season: 56 (Azadegan League 1998–99),55 (IPL 2007–08)
- Most goals scored in a match: 8 against Pegah F.C. (IPL 2003–04)
- Most goals conceded in a match: 4 against Esteghlal Ahvaz F.C. (IPL 2007–08), TractorSazi (2011–12)

=== Statistics in AFC Champions League ===
- Most goals scored in a match: 6 against Al-Shabab (UAE) (2012) (21 March 2012)
- Most goals conceded in a match: 5 against Al-Gharafa (2009) (21 April 2009)

== Player records ==
=== Appearances ===
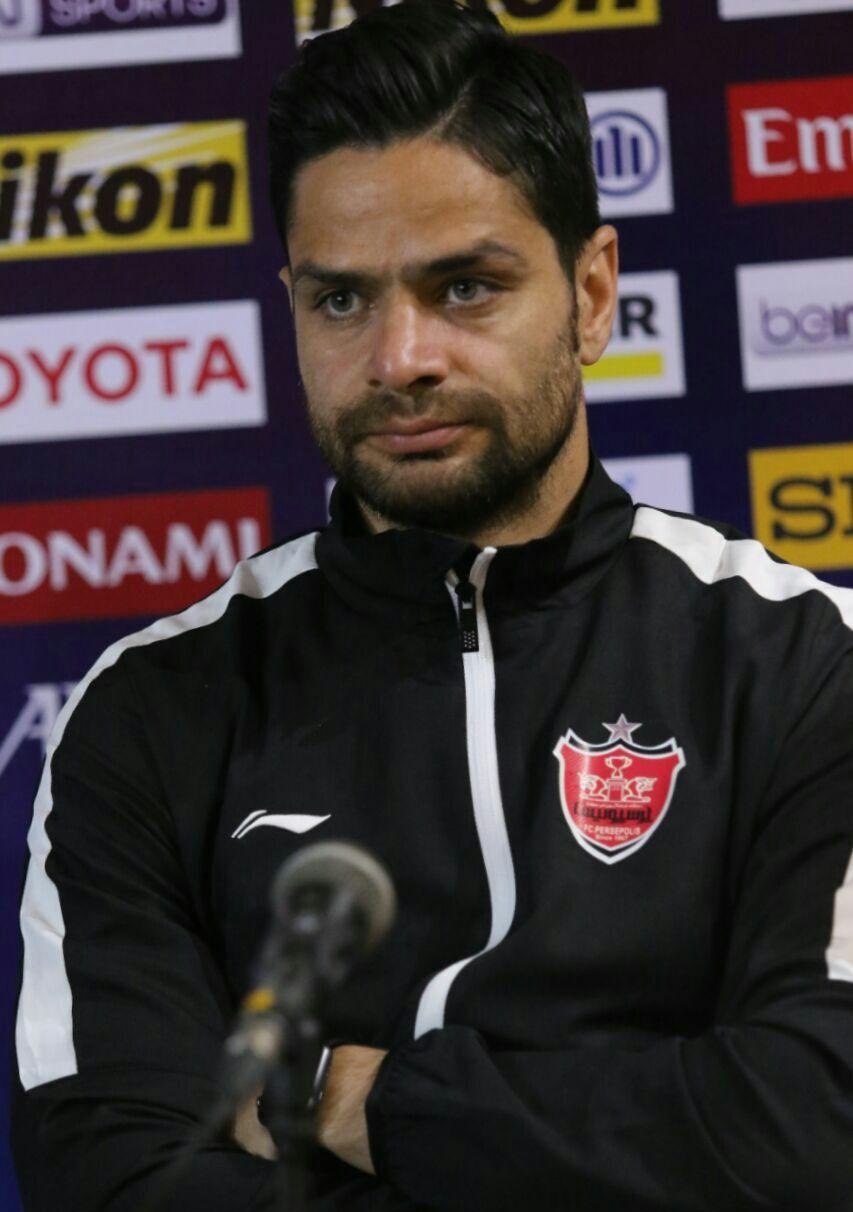
Kamyabinia who have won most league titles with the club (6).

- Most Appearances:341 Ali Parvin
- Most League Appearances: Afshin Peyrovani (209)
- Most Goalkeeper Appearances: Alireza Beiranvand (199)
- Youngest first-team player : Mehdi Mahdavikia (17 years and 206 days old)
- Youngest first-team player in a league match : Mehdi Mahdavikia (17 years and 206 days old)
- Oldest first-team player : Ali Parvin (41 years and ? days old)
- Player who has won most league titles: Kamal Kamyabinia (6 titles)

=== Goalscorers ===
- All-time top scorer: Farshad Pious with 153 goals
- First Goalscorer : Nazem Ganjapour
- First Goalscorer in Tehran derby: Nazem Ganjapour
- Most Goalscorer in Tehran derby: 7 (Safar Iranpak)
- Most goals in a season : 26 (Ali Alipour, 2017–18)
- Most League goals in a season : 20 (Farshad Pious, 1994–95)
- Most goals in a single match at home : 4 goals (Ali Daei, 2003–04)
- Most goals in an AFC Champions League match : 3 Emon Zayed (Al-Shabab), Mehdi Taremi (Al Wahda )
- Fastest recorded goal : 00:07 Gholamreza Rezaei vs Fajr Sepasi (2012–13 Pro League)
- Latest recorded goal : 90+10:24 Vahid Amiri vs Machine Sazi (2019–20 Hazfi Cup)
- Youngest goalscorer : Mehdi Mahdavikia against Polyacryl (17 years and 300 days old)

== Players statistics ==
=== Most appearances ===
20 November 2026
	Name	Nationality	Position	total
1	Ali parvin	Iran	Midfielder	341
2	Omid Alishah	Iran	Midfielder	298
3	Ali Alipour	Iran	Forward	288
4	Mohammad Panjali	Iran	Defender	264
5	Hossein Abdi	Iran	Midfielder	261
5	Jalal Hosseini	Iran	Defender	261
7	Afshin Peyrovani	Iran	Defender	255
8	Vahid Amiri	Iran	Midfielder	254
9	Behrouz Rahbarifar	Iran	Defender	249
10	Kamal Kamyabinia	Iran	Midfielder	235

=== Top goalscorers ===
20 November 2026
	Name	Nationality	Position	Goals
1	Farshad Pious	Iran	Forward	153
2	Ali Alipour	Iran	Forward	98
3	Ali Parvin	Iran	Midfielder	95
4	Homayoun Behzadi	Iran	Forward	83
5	Safar Iranpak	Iran	Forward	74
6	Hossein Kalani	Iran	Forward	71
7	Naser Mohammadkhani	Iran	Forward	59
8	Mehdi Taremi	Iran	Forward	55
9	Karim Bagheri	Iran	Midfielder	43
9	Ali Daei	Iran	Forward	43

Most goals scored in official competitions: 153– Farshad Pious 1985–1988 & 1989–1997.

=== Most appearances Foreigners ===
20 November 2026
	Name	Nationality	Position	total
1	Bashar Resan	(Iraq)	Midfielder	103
2	Giorgi Gvelesiani	(Georgia (country))	Defender	100
3	Nilson Corrêa Júnior	(Brazil)	Goalkeeper	73
4	Oston Urunov	(Uzbekistan)	Midfielder	70
5	Godwin Mensha	(Nigeria)	Forward	63
6	Michael Umaña	(Costa Rica)	Defender	51
7	Tiago Fraga	(Brazil)	Midfielder	47
8	Božidar Radošević	(Croatia)	Goalkeeper	42
8	Vakhdat Khanonov	(Tajikistan)	Defender	42
10	Robert Caha	(Czech Republic)	Defender	38
11	Jacques Elong Elong	(Cameroon)	Midfielder	37
11	Alexis Guendouz	(Algeria)	Goalkeeper	37
13	Shpejtim Arifi	(Socialist Federal Republic of Yugoslavia)	Forward	36
14	Ivan Petrović	(Serbia)	Midfielder	34
15	Ibrahima Touré	(Senegal)	Forward	31

=== Top Foreigners goalscorers ===
20 November 2026
	Name	Nationality	Position	Goals
1	Giorgi Gvelesiani	(Georgia (country))	Defender	20
2	Oston Urunov	(Uzbekistan)	Midfielder	16
3	Alan Whittle	(England)	Forward	14
3	Godwin Mensha	(Nigeria)	Forward	14
5	Ibrahima Touré	(Senegal)	Forward	13
6	Éamon Zayed	(Libya)	Forward	12
7	Shpejtim Arifi	(Socialist Federal Republic of Yugoslavia)	Forward	9
8	Jerry Bengtson	(Honduras)	Forward	7
9	Jürgen Locadia	(Curaçao)	Forward	6
9	Hawar Mulla Mohammed	(Iraq)	Midfielder	6
11	Serdar Dursun	(Turkey)	Forward	5
11	Bashar Resan	(Iraq)	Midfielder	5
11	Thievy Bifouma	(Republic of the Congo)	Midfielder	5
14	Tiago Fraga	(Brazil)	Midfielder	4
14	Igor Sergeev	(Uzbekistan)	Forward	4
16	Issa Traoré	(Mali)	Midfielder	3
16	Zyad Chaabo	(Syria)	Forward	3
16	Mate Dragičević	(Croatia)	Forward	3
16	Cheick Diabaté	(Mali)	Forward	3

=== Persepolis top flight top goalscorer ===
This is the list of Persepolis top league goalscorers in a single season.

	Name	Season	Goals
1	Hossein Kalani	1970–71	7
2	Hossein Kalani	1971–72	11
2	Safar Iranpak	1971–72	11
3	Farshad Pious	1991–92	11
4	Farshad Pious	1994–95	20
5	Ali Daei	2003–04	16
6	Mohsen Khalili	2007–08	18
7	Mehdi Taremi	2015–16	16
8	Mehdi Taremi	2016–17	18
9	Ali Alipour	2017–18	19

== Transfers ==
=== Record transfer fees ===
- Record transfer fee received:

The club's record sale came in July 2001, when they sold Ali Karimi to Al-Ahli Dubai for a fee of €2.5 million.

€ 2.500.000 from (United Arab Emirates) Al-Ahli Dubai for (Iran) Ali Karimi, July 2001
€ 2.250.000 from (Germany) Hamburger SV for (Iran) Mehdi Mahdavikia 2001
€ 1.250.000 from (Germany) Hamburger SV for (Iran) Mehdi Mahdavikia, 1999
€ 1.150.000 from (Austria) SK Sturm Graz for (Iran) Mehrdad Minavand, 1998
€ 950.000^{†} from (Russia) Rubin Kazan for (Iran) Alireza Haghighi, January 2012
€ 550.000^{‡} from (England) Charlton Athletic for (Iran) Karim Bagheri, 2000
€ 500.000 from (United Arab Emirates) Al-Shaab for (Iran) Mehrzad Madanchi, 2006

^{†} about $ 1.400.000
^{‡} about £ 400,000

== World Cup players ==
The following World Cup players, played at Persepolis at some point during their career. Highlighted players played for Persepolis while playing at the World Cup.

- (Iran) Javad Allahverdi (1978)
- (Iran) Ali Parvin (1978)
- (Iran) Mohammad Sadeghi (1978)
- (Iran) Bahram Mavaddat (1978)
- (Iran) Nasser Nouraei (1978)
- (Iran) Hossein Faraki (1978)
- (Iran) Ahmad Reza Abedzadeh (1998)
- (Iran) Mehdi Mahdavikia (1998)
- (Iran) Naeim Saadavi (1998)
- (Iran) Mohammad Khakpour (1998)
- (Iran) Afshin Peyrovani (1998)
- (Iran) Karim Bagheri (1998)
- (Iran) Hamid Estili (1998)
- (Iran) Ali Daei (1998)
- (Iran) Khodadad Azizi (1998)
- (Iran) Nima Nakisa (1998)
- (Iran) Nader Mohammadkhani (1998)
- (Iran) Reza Shahroudi (1998)
- (Iran) Behnam Seraj (1998)
- (Iran) Mehrdad Minavand (1998)
- (Iran) Mehdi Mahdavikia (2006)
- (Iran) Yahya Golmohammadi (2006)
- (Iran) Rahman Rezaei (2006)
- (Iran) Ali Karimi (2006)
- (Iran) Ali Daei (2006)
- (Iran) Vahid Hashemian (2006)
- (Iran) Hassan Roudbarian (2006)
- (Iran) Hossein Kaebi (2006)
- (Iran) Javad Kazemian (2006)
- (Iran) Mehrzad Madanchi (2006)
- (Iran) Mohammad Nosrati (2006)
- (Togo) Franck Atsou (2006)
- (Costa Rica) Michael Umaña (2014)
- (Iran) Rahman Ahmadi (2014)
- (Iran) Jalal Hosseini (2014)
- (Iran) Reza Haghighi (2014)
- (Iran) Karim Ansarifard (2014) (2018) (2022)
- (Iran) Alireza Haghighi (2014)
- (Iran) Hossein Mahini (2014)
- (Iran) Mehrdad Pooladi (2014)
- (Iran) Alireza Beiranvand (2018) (2022)
- (Iran) Vahid Amiri (2018) (2022)
- (Iran) Mehdi Taremi (2018) (2022)
- (Iran) Ramin Rezaeian (2018) (2022)
- (Iran) Mohammad Reza Khanzadeh (2018)
- (Iran) Mehdi Torabi (2018) (2022)
- (Iran) Morteza Pouraliganji (2022)
- (Iran) Sadegh Moharrami (2022)
- (Iran) Shojae Khalilzadeh (2022)
- (Iran) Ahmad Nourollahi (2022)
- (Iran) Payam Niazmand (2026)
- (Iran) Hossein Kanaanizadegan (2026)
- (Iran) Milad Mohammadi (2026)
- (Iran) Ali Alipour (2026)
- (Uzbekistan) Oston Urunov (2026)
- (Uzbekistan) Igor Sergeev (2026)
