= Cambodia at the AFC Asian Cup =

National football delegation

Khmer Republic participated in the 1972 edition of the AFC Asian Cup and won 4th place.

== Editions ==
Year	Round	GP	W	D	L	GS	GA
(Hong Kong) 1956	Did not qualify						
(South Korea) 1960	Withdrew						
(Israel) 1964	Withdrew						
(Iran) 1968	Did not qualify						
(Thailand) 1972	Fourth place	5	1	1	3	8	10
(Iran) 1976 to (United Arab Emirates) 1996	Did not enter						
(Lebanon) 2000	Did not qualify						
(China) 2004	Did not enter						
(Indonesia) (Malaysia) (Thailand) (Vietnam) 2007	Did not enter						
(Qatar) 2011	Did not qualify						
(Australia) 2015	Did not qualify						
(United Arab Emirates) 2019	Did not qualify						
(Qatar) 2023	Did not qualify						
Total	Fourth place	5	1	1	3	8	10

== 1972 Asian Cup ==
=== Group allocation match ===
7 May 1972

Iran	2–0	Khmer Republic
Kalani 45'; Iranpak 51'

National Stadium, Bangkok
Attendance: 2,000
Referee: Kim Jo-Wong (South Korea)

=== Group B ===
Team	Pld	W	D	L	GF	GA	GD	Pts
South Korea	2	1	0	1	5	3	+2	2
Khmer Republic	2	1	0	1	5	4	+1	2
Kuwait	2	1	0	1	2	5	−3	2

10 May 1972

South Korea	4–1	Khmer Republic
Park Su-deok 37'; Lee Hoi-taek 59'; Cha Bum-kun 69'; Park Lee-chun 78'		Doeur Sokhom 82'

National Stadium, Bangkok

14 May 1972

Khmer Republic	4–0	Kuwait
Doeur Sokhom 23'; Sok Sun Hean 56'; Tes Sean 59'; Sea Cheng Eang 80'

National Stadium, Bangkok

=== Semi-finals ===
16 May 1972

Iran	2–1	Khmer Republic
Iranpak 13'; Ghelichkhani 47'		Doeur Sokhom 18'

National Stadium, Bangkok
Attendance: 2,000
Referee: Matolozi (Malaysia)

=== Third place play-off ===
19 May 1972

Khmer Republic	2–2 (a.e.t.)	Thailand
Penalties
	3–5

National Stadium, Bangkok
