= Saeid Azizian =

Iranian goalkeeper and coach

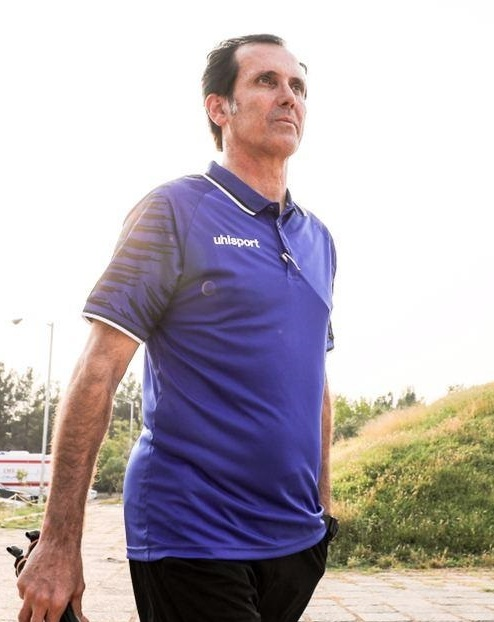

Personal information
- Full name: Saeid Azizian
- Date of birth: December 18, 1965 (age 60)
- Place of birth: Tehran, Iran
- Position: Goalkeeper

Youth career
- 1984–1988: Esteghlal

Senior career*
Years	Team	Apps	(Gls)
1988–1989	Esteghlal		
1989–1991	Persepolis		

International career
1990–1991	Iran	2	(0)
- * Club domestic league appearances and goals

Saeid Azizian (Persian: سعید عزیزیان, born 18 December 1965 in Tehran, Iran) is a retired Iranian football goalkeeper and a current coach.

== Club career ==
=== Esteghlal ===
He joined Esteghlal academy in 1984 and was promoted to the first team in 1988 by then-coach Gholam Hossein Mazloumi. He played one season for the club but joined Esteghlal's rival Persepolis in the next season.

=== Persepolis ===
He signed a two years contract before the start of the 1989–90 season with Persepolis. His excellent performance was praised by many coaches and he was invited in the same year to the Iran national football team but after his violent injury occurred in a match in Qods League, he was far away from football for more than one year. He announced his retirement at the end of the season due to his injury.

=== International career ===
While playing for Persepolis he was invited by Ali Parvin to the national team and has two caps. He made his debut in a friendly match against Poland. The other match he played was against USSR.

== Coaching career ==
After retiring he returned to Persepolis as a goalkeeping coach when Afshin Ghotbi became the team's head coach. He continued with their new head coach Afshin Peyrovani, but after Peyrovani resigned and Nelo Vingada took over as the club head coach, Azizian's contract was terminated. He became the goalkeeping coach of Shahin Bushehr in 2010 and worked with that team until the end of the season. After Yahya Golmohammadi became Persepolis' head coach, Azizian returned to his first coaching career on 2 February 2013. He is currently goalkeeping coach of Padideh, after working with Saba Qom and Mes Kerman.

== Honors ==
Persepolis

- Iranian Football League:
  - Runner-up (1): 1989–90
- Hazfi Cup:
  - Winner (1): 1990–91
