= Ahmad Monshizadeh =

Iranian footballer

Personal information
- Full name: Ahmad Monshizadeh
- Date of birth: 23 June 1944 (age 82)
- Place of birth: Tehran, Iran
- Position: Midfielder

Youth career
- 1959–1961: Nader

Senior career*
Years	Team	Apps	(Gls)
1961–1964	Tehranjavan		
1964–1971	Taj		
1971–1972	Afsar		
1972–1973	Taj		
- * Club domestic league appearances and goals as of 26 July 2022

Ahmad Monshizadeh (Persian: احمد منشی زاده; born 23 June 1944) is a retired Iranian professional footballer. He is the first goalscorer in Tehran derby.
