= Iraj Soleimani =

Iranian footballer

Personal information
- Full name: Iraj Soleimani
- Date of birth: 15 December 1946
- Place of birth: Masjed Soleyman, Iran
- Date of death: 23 February 2009 (aged 62)
- Place of death: Karaj, Iran
- Position: Striker

Youth career
- 1960–1962: Shahbaz

Senior career*
Years	Team	Apps	(Gls)
1961–1971	Shahbaz		
1971–1975	Persepolis	115	(40)

Managerial career
- 1980–1982: Iran U-23
- * Club domestic league appearances and goals

Iraj Soleimani (15 December 1946 – 23 February 2009) was an Iranian professional footballer. Soleimani was born in Masjed Soleiman, Khuzestan, Iran. He played for Shahbaz F.C. and capped for Persepolis F.C. 115 times. He scored 2 goals in the Tehran derby that Persepolis won with 6 goals. He managed Iran U23 from 1980 to 1982.
