= Nazem Ganjapour =

Iranian footballer (1943–2013)

Personal information
- Full name: Nazem Ganjapour
- Date of birth: 22 March 1943
- Place of birth: Ahvaz, Iran
- Date of death: 21 February 2013 (aged 69)
- Place of death: Tehran, Iran
- Position: Forward

Youth career
- 1962–1964: Shahin

Senior career*
| Years | Team | Apps | (Gls) |
| 1964–1967 | Shahin | | |
| 1968–1972 | Persepolis | | |

International career
| 1967 | Iran | 1 | (0) |

Managerial career
- 1970–1973: Shahbaz
- * Club domestic league appearances and goals

Nazem Ganjapour (Persian: ناظم گنجاپور, March 22, 1943 – February 21, 2013) was an Iranian football player. In the last match of Shahin against Tehranjavan, he scored a hat trick. After this he joined Persepolis. Later, he was a scout and coached youth clubs.

== Club career ==
He played for Shahin from 1964 to 1967, then Persepolis from 1968 to 1971.

== National career ==
He played in RCD Cup 1967 for Iran national football team. He has only one cap to his name, a match against Pakistan on November 24, 1967.

== Records ==
- He is the last player who scored for Shahin.
- He is the first player who scored for Persepolis.
- He is the first Persepolis player that could score in Tehran derby.
