= Sajjad Shahbazzadeh =

Iranian association footballer (born 1990)

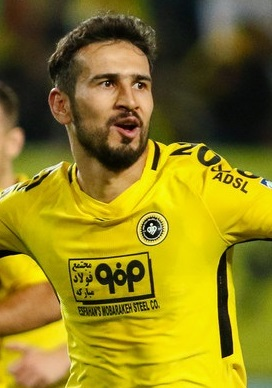
- Shahbazzadeh with Sepahan in 2018

Personal information
- Full name: Sajjad Shahbazzadeh
- Date of birth: 23 January 1990 (age 36)
- Place of birth: Ardabil, Iran
- Height: 1.85 m (6 ft 1 in)
- Position: Forward

Youth career
- 2005–2009: Zob Ahan Ardabil
- 2009–2010: Saipa

Senior career*
Years	Team	Apps	(Gls)
2010–2014	Saipa	91	(20)
2014–2016	Esteghlal	56	(19)
2016–2017	Alanyaspor	4	(1)
2017	Naft Tehran	8	(0)
2017–2018	Esteghlal	8	(0)
2018	Qatar SC	2	(0)
2018–2022	Sepahan	111	(35)
2022–2023	Esteghlal	16	(0)
2023–2024	Mes Rafsanjan	25	(4)
2024–2025	Esteghlal Khuzestan	19	(3)
- * Club domestic league appearances and goals as of 1 January 2024

Sajjad Shahbazzadeh (Persian: سجاد شهباززاده, born 23 January 1990) is an Iranian professional footballer who plays as a striker for Persian Gulf Pro League club Esteghlal Khuzestan.

== Club career ==
=== Youth clubs ===
As a native of Ardabil, Shahbazzadeh started playing football as a child in Inter Campus of Ardabil, before moving to Zob Ahan Ardabil at the age of 14.

=== Saipa ===
Shahbazzadeh had played his entire career at Saipa from 2010 until 2014. In his last season with Saipa he scored 9 goals in all competition which lead him to move to the league giant Esteghlal.

=== Esteghlal ===
==== 2014–15 Season ====
He signed for Esteghlal in summer 2014. He made his debut for Esteghlal in 2–1 win over Rah Ahan. His first goal for the club was the winning goal against Esteghlal Khuzestan. He played his first Tehran derby on 23 November in a 2–1 defeat which he scored Esteghlal's only goal of the match. On 4 February he played against his former team Saipa and scored the single goal of the match. He finished his first season with Esteghlal with 12 goals in the league which made him the runner-up in the season's Golden Boot, behind Éder Luciano.

==== 2015–16 Season ====
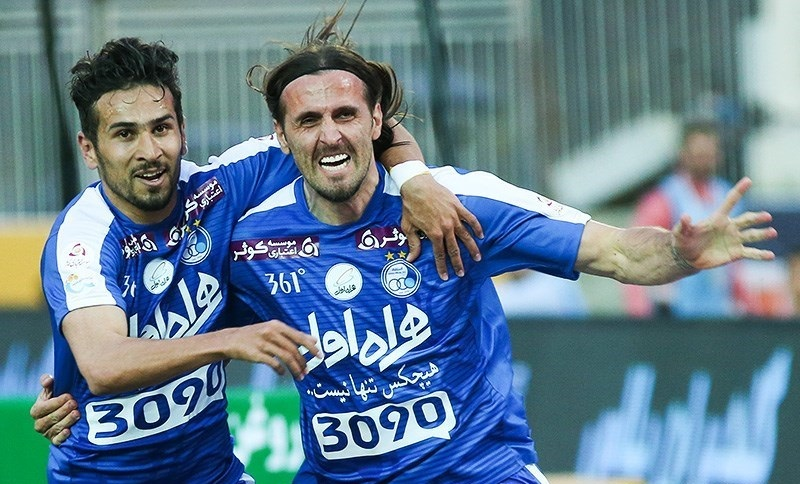
Shahbazzadeh (left) celebrating with Pero Pejić after Pejić scored against Saipa

Shahbazzzadeh scored a brace in the first game of the season against Siah jamegan which Esteghlal won 2–1. After 3 weeks of injury he scored his second goal in a 2–0 win against Gostaresh. He ended the season with 7 league goals and 4 goals in Hazfi Cup which made him the top scorer of the competition.

In summer of 2016 Shahbazzadeh announced he wanted to leave Esteghlal for a European team, however Esteghlal refused to let the player leave as he was still under contract with the club. After weeks of negotiations on 20 July 2016, he was finally released from Esteghlal.

=== Alanyaspor ===
On 22 July 2016, he officially joined the recently promoted club in Turkish Süper Lig. On 20 August he made his debut in a 4–1 loss against Beşiktaş J.K. entering as a substitute for Jonathan Ayité. On 26 August he started his first match for the club against Antalyaspor which Alanyaspor won 2–1. During his second start for the club on 25 December 2016, he scored his first goal for the club against Turkish giants Galatasaray.

Shahbazzadeh left the club in January 2017 after not receiving adequate playing time.

=== Naft Tehran ===
After failing to return to Esteghlal due to the club's transfer ban, Shahbazzadeh joined Naft Tehran during winter transfers. He scored Naft's winning goal against Tractor Sazi in Hazfi cup's final in May 2017.

=== Return to Esteghlal ===
On 14 June, Shahbazzadeh Return to Esteghlal from Naft Tehran. Esteghlal's coach Alireza Mansourian had promised to keep the shirt number 10 vacant until Shahbazzadeh returns and upon his return, he was assigned the shirt number 10, as he was wearing it in his previous spell.

On 10 July 2017 during Esteghlal's pre-season, he played in a friendly against Pars Jonoubi Jam which he managed to score. He played his first official league match on 28 June 2017, in Esteghlal's opening match of the season, which they lost 1–0 against Sanat Naft. On 17 August 2017, Shahbazzadeh suffered a knee injury in a 1–0 defeat against Saipa. He returned in action against Foolad on 13 October. Due to consecutive injuries, fell behind fellow striker Ali Ghorbani and new Esteghlal coach Winfried Schäfer asked him to search for a new club for the rest of 2017–18 season. On 14 January 2018, he officially terminated his contract with the club.

=== Qatar SC ===
On 17 January 2018, Shahbazzadeh signed with Qatari side Qatar SC. Two days later, he was included in the starting line up against Al-Markhiya in which assisted Patrick Fabiano's single goal of the match. However his contract was terminated by the club 13 days after signing for them and Luis Antonio Jiménez replaced him in the squad. The reason for contract termination was due to the continues injuries he was dealing earlier in the season.

=== Sepahan ===
On 30 May 2018, Shahbazzadeh returned to Iran joining Sepahan where he reunited with his former coach Amir Ghalenoei. On 27 July, he made his debut against Sanat Naft. A week later he opened his scoring tally with a brace against Sepidrood, with the team winning 6–1 away from home.

Shahbazzadeh finished the 2020–21 season as the top scorer of the league with 20 goals.

=== Third spell at Esteghlal ===
On 26 June 2022, Esteghlal announced on their social media that Shahbazzadeh had rejoined the club.

=== Mes Rafsanjan ===
Shahbazzadeh joined Mes Rafsanjan on 30 July 2023 with a 2-year contract.

== Career statistics ==
=== Club ===
As of 1 January 2024

Club performance			League		Cup		Continental		Total	
Club	Season	League	Apps	Goals	Apps	Goals	Apps	Goals	Apps	Goals
Iran		Division			Hazfi Cup		AFC		Total	
Saipa	2010–11	Iran Pro League	1	0	0	0	–		9	1
Saipa	2011–12	Iran Pro League	21	4	1	0	–		22	4
Saipa	2012–13	Iran Pro League	31	6	0	0	–		31	6
Saipa	2013–14	Iran Pro League	30	9	1	0	–		30	9
Esteghlal	2014–15	Iran Pro League	30	12	2	1	–		32	13
Esteghlal	2015–16	Iran Pro League	26	7	4	4	–		30	11
Turkey		Division			Turkish Cup		UEFA		Total	
Alanyaspor	2016–17	Süper Lig	4	1	1	0	–		5	1
Iran		Division			Hazfi Cup		AFC		Total	
Naft Tehran	2016–17	Iran Pro League	8	0	1	1	–		9	1
Esteghlal	2017–18	Iran Pro League	8	0	1	0	0	0	9	0
Qatar		Division			Emir Cup		AFC		Total	
Qatar SC	2017–18	Qatar Stars League	2	0	0	0	–		2	0
Iran		Division			Hazfi Cup		AFC		Total	
Sepahan	2018–19	Iran Pro League	29	6	4	1	–		33	7
Sepahan	2019–20	Iran Pro League	23	3	2	1	5	1	30	5
Sepahan	2020–21	Iran Pro League	30	20	3	1	–		33	21
Sepahan	2021–22	Iran Pro League	27	6	1	1	6	2	35	9
Esteghlal	2022–23	Iran Pro League	16	0	3	0	–		19	0
Mes Rafsanjan	2023–24	Iran Pro League	10	1	0	0	–		10	1
Iran total			291	74	23	10	11	3	325	87
Turkey total			4	1	1	0	–	–	5	1
Qatar total			2	0	0	0	–	–	2	0
Career total			297	75	24	10	11	3	332	88

== Honours ==
=== Club ===
Esteghlal

- Hazfi Cup Runner-up: 2015–16, 2022–23
- Iranian Super Cup (1):2022

Naft Tehran

- Hazfi Cup (1): 2016–17

=== Individual ===
- Persian Gulf Pro League Top scorer: 2020–21
- Persian Gulf Pro League Team of the Year: 2014–15
- Hazfi Cup Top scorer: 2015–16
