= Glut =

Glut or GLUT may refer to:

- Embers (1983 film) (German: Glut), a Swiss–West German drama film
- Glöð (English: Glut), a legendary queen who figures in the Norse Þorsteins saga Víkingssonar
- Glucose transporter (GLUT), a wide group of membrane proteins
- Glut, a fictional great white shark in The Little Mermaid franchise
- Donald F. Glut (born 1944), American writer, motion picture film director, and screenwriter
- Glut: Mastering Information Through the Ages, a 2007 historical overview by Alex Wright
- OpenGL Utility Toolkit (GLUT), a library of utilities for OpenGL programs
- Overproduction (also called glut), excess of supply over demand of products being offered to the market
- In football, it means a player has scored five goals in one game.
