= Takht Jamshid Cup =

Takht Jamshid Cup جام تخت جمشید (Jâm-e Taxt-e Jamšid)
- Founded: 1974
- Folded: 1979
- Country: Imperial State of Iran
- Confederation: AFC
- Divisions: 1
- Number of clubs: 16
- Level on pyramid: 1
- Relegation to: Division 2
- Domestic cup: Pahlavi Cup
- Last champions: Pas Tehran, 1977/78
- Most championships: Persepolis, Pas Tehran (2 titles)

The Takht Jamshid Cup (Persian: جام تخت جمشید, Jâm-e Taxt-e Jamšid) was a national football league based in Iran which lasted from 1974 to 1979. The league was named after Takht-e Jamshid, the Iranian name for the ancient city known as Persepolis.

== History ==
=== Before 1970 ===
Before the 1970s, Iran did not have an official national football league. Most clubs participated in championships of their city or province. Therefore the champion of the Tehran Premier League was seen as the Iranian football champion. Due to their achievements in the Tehran Premier League, Shahin Tehran and Taj, today known as Esteghlal, were the most popular teams at this time. Also Daraei and PAS Tehran were successful clubs in Tehran's own league.

=== Takht Jamshid Cup ===
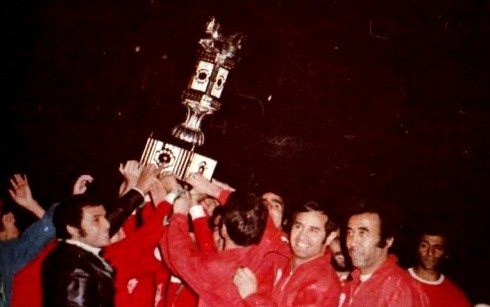
Persepolis winning the Takht Jamshid Cup in 1973

In 1974, the Takht Jamshid Cup was founded as the national league and included teams from all over the country. The Iranian Football Federation had decided to create a league similar to European football leagues. The Takht Jamshid Cup comprised twelve clubs in the 1973–74 season. Persepolis became the first champions of the Takht Jamshid Cup, two points ahead of rival Taj.

Before the beginning of the 1974–75 season, the number of teams were increased from twelve to 16 teams. Esteghlal claimed its first Takht Jamshid Cup title after winning the league ahead of Persepolis. The 1975–76 Takht Jamshid Cup was won by Persepolis with a great performance by Iranian football legend Ali Parvin. The second place team was another Tehran based club, Homa. The next two seasons were won by PAS Tehran under coach Hassan Habibi. PAS Tehran won their championships both times ahead of Persepolis. At this time the Takht Jamshid Cup was one of the strongest football leagues in Asia. The Iran national football team won in 1976 their third successive AFC Asian Cup and qualified 1978 for the FIFA World Cup for the first time in the country's history.

=== 1979 Revolution and 1980s ===
The 1978–79 Takht Jamshid Cup season was abandoned due to the 1979 Revolution. Shahbaz was leading the league after twelve matchdays ahead of Persepolis and Taj. Due to the Islamic Revolution and the Iran–Iraq War, the Takht Jamshid Cup was dissolved and also the lower leagues were unorganized. Once again the champion of the Tehran Province League was seen as the Iranian football champion.

== Takht Jamshid Cup Champions ==
Season	Winner	Runner-up	Third place	
1973–74	Persepolis	Taj	Pas	
1974–75	Taj	Persepolis	Homa	
1975–76	Persepolis	Homa	Pas	
1976–77	Pas	Persepolis	Shahbaz	
1977–78	Pas	Persepolis	Malavan	
~~1978–79~~	Shahbaz	Persepolis	Taj	Not Completed due to 1979 Revolution ‡

‡ Shahbaz F.C. was league leader when in autumn 1978 the season was canceled.

== Total titles ==
Club	Winner	Runner up	3rd place
Persepolis	2 (1973–74), (1975–76)	3 (1974–75), (1976–77), (1977–78)	—
Pas Tehran	2 (1976–77), (1977–78)	—	2 (1973–74) (1975–76)
Taj	1 (1974–75)	1 (1973–74)	—
Homa	—	1 (1975–76)	1 (1974–75)
Shahbaz	—	—	1 (1976–77)
Malavan	—	—	1 (1977–78)

== See also ==
- Football in Iran
- Iran's Premier Football League
