= 1975–76 Takht Jamshid Cup =

Takht Jamshid Cup
- Season: 1975–76
- Champions: Persepolis
- Relegated: Rah Ahan; Tractor Sazi
- Matches: 240
- Goals: 416 (1.73 per match)
- Top goalscorer: Nasser Noraei (18)

The 1975–76 season was the third season of the Takht Jamshid Cup of Iranian football. The competition was won by Persepolis Football Club of Tehran.

== Results ==
Pos	Team	Pld	W	D	L	GF	GA	GD	Pts	Relegation
1	Persepolis (C)	30	16	12	2	36	12	+24	44	
2	Homa	30	12	15	3	38	25	+13	39	
3	PAS Tehran	30	13	12	5	22	13	+9	38	
4	Taj	30	12	12	6	33	21	+12	36	
5	Aboomoslem	30	13	9	8	28	20	+8	35	
6	Daraei	30	9	15	6	19	15	+4	33	
7	Malavan	30	11	8	11	39	32	+7	30	
8	Sanat Naft	30	9	9	12	27	31	−4	27	
9	Zob Ahan	30	6	15	9	16	23	−7	27	
10	Bank Melli	30	7	13	10	23	35	−12	27	
11	Sepahan	30	8	10	12	24	27	−3	26	
12	Ararat F.C.	30	8	10	12	23	31	−8	26	
13	Niroo Ahvaz	30	7	11	12	28	32	−4	25	
14	Bargh Shiraz	30	4	16	10	20	29	−9	24	
15	Rah Ahan (R)	30	5	14	11	19	29	−10	24	Relegated to 2nd Division
16	Tractor Sazi (R)	30	4	11	15	21	41	−20	19	Relegated to 2nd Division

(C) Champions; (R) Relegated

== Top goalscorers ==
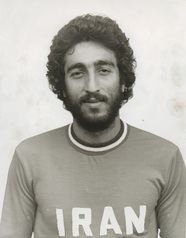
Nasser Nouraei

Pos	Scorer	Goals	Team
1st	(Iran) Nasser Nouraei	18	Homa
2nd	(Iran) Zolfaghar Nezam Abadi	11	Naft
	(Iran) Mahmoud Ebrahimzadeh	11	Aboomoslem
	(Iran) Ali Niakani	11	Malavan
5th	(Iran) Safar Iranpak	10	Persepolis
6th	(Iran) Aziz Espandar	9	Malavan
