= 1973–74 Takht Jamshid Cup =

Takht Jamshid Cup
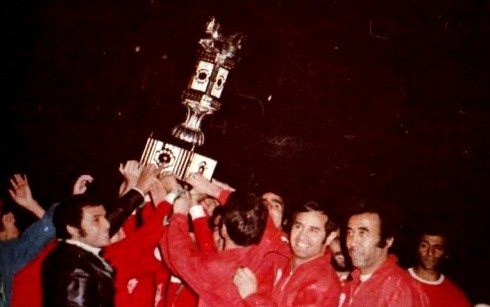
- Season: 1973–74
- Champions: Persepolis
- Relegated: Bargh Tehran; Machine Sazi
- Matches: 132
- Goals: 307 (2.33 per match)
- Top goalscorer: Gholam Hossein Mazloumi (15)

The Takht Jamshid Cup's 1973–74 football season was the first season of Iranian national football league and the first season after the establishment of the Takht Jamshid Cup. Persepolis F.C. were champions.

== Standings ==
| Pos | Team | Pld | W | D | L | GF | GA | GD | Pts | Relegation |
|---|---|---|---|---|---|---|---|---|---|---|
| 1 | Persepolis (C) | 22 | 15 | 7 | 0 | 46 | 6 | +40 | 37 | |
| 2 | Taj | 22 | 14 | 7 | 1 | 44 | 15 | +29 | 35 | |
| 3 | PAS Tehran | 22 | 13 | 7 | 2 | 32 | 7 | +25 | 33 | |
| 4 | Oghab Tehran | 22 | 10 | 10 | 2 | 30 | 13 | +17 | 30 | |
| 5 | Malavan | 22 | 10 | 4 | 8 | 27 | 23 | +4 | 24 | |
| 6 | Sanat Naft Abadan | 22 | 8 | 4 | 10 | 25 | 33 | −8 | 20 | |
| 7 | Rah Ahan | 22 | 6 | 7 | 9 | 19 | 24 | −5 | 19 | |
| 8 | Bank Melli | 22 | 5 | 6 | 11 | 15 | 31 | −16 | 16 | |
| 9 | Taj Ahvaz | 22 | 4 | 8 | 10 | 19 | 40 | −21 | 16 | |
| 10 | Zob Ahan | 22 | 4 | 7 | 11 | 23 | 35 | −12 | 15 | |
| 11 | Bargh Tehran (R) | 22 | 2 | 8 | 12 | 16 | 32 | −16 | 12 | Relegated to 2nd Division |
| 12 | Machine Sazi (R) | 22 | 1 | 5 | 16 | 11 | 48 | −37 | 7 | Relegated to 2nd Division |

(C) Champions; (R) Relegated

== Top goalscorers ==
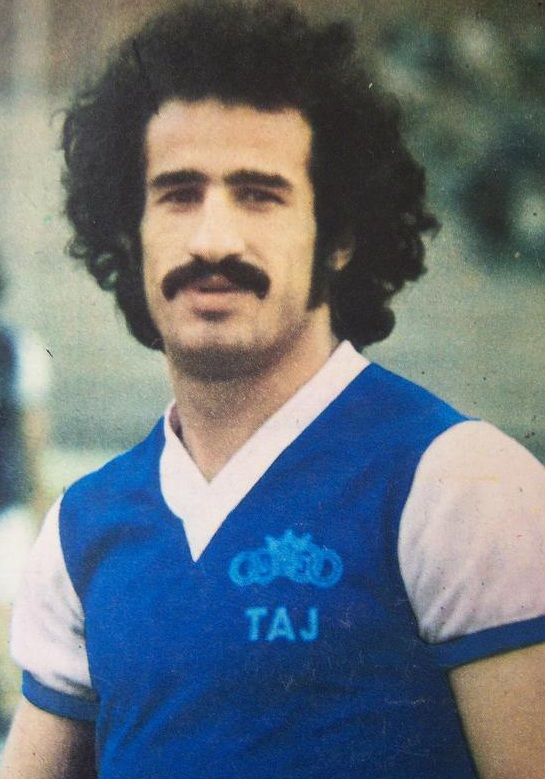
Gholam Hossein Mazloumi

| Pos | Scorer | Goals | Team |
|---|---|---|---|
| 1st | (Iran) Gholam Hossein Mazloumi | 15 | Taj |
| 2nd | (Iran) Ghafour Jahani | 13 | Malavan |
| 3rd | (Iran) Aziz Espandar | 10 | Malavan |
| 3rd | (Iran) Siavash Heydari | 10 | Zob Ahan |
| 4th | (Iran) Fariborz Esmaeili | 8 | Oghab |
| 5th | (Iran) Safar Iranpak | 8 | Persepolis |
| 5th | (Iran) Ali Jabbari | 8 | Taj |
| 5th | (Iran) Hossein Kalani | 8 | Persepolis |
