= Aziz Espandar =

Iranian footballer and coach

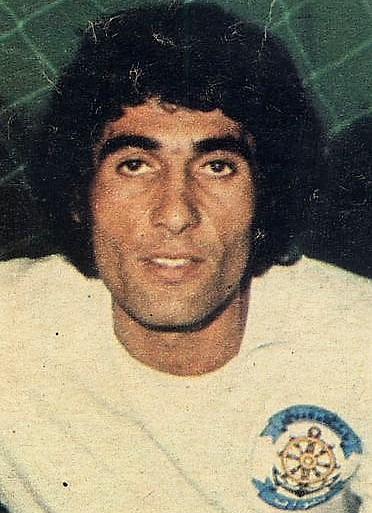

Personal information
- Full name: Aziz Espandar
- Date of birth: February 2, 1948 (age 78)
- Place of birth: Bandar-e Anzali, Iran
- Height: 1.80 m (5 ft 11 in)
- Position: Forward

Youth career
- 1968–1971: Malavan

Senior career*
Years	Team	Apps	(Gls)
1969–1986	Malavan	550	(117)

Managerial career
- 1988–1990: Malavan (youth)
- 1990: Malavan (caretaker)
- 1991–1999: Iran U-20
- * Club domestic league appearances and goals

Aziz Espandar (Persian: عزیز اسپندار, (born 2 February 1948) is a retired Iranian football player and coach. He became the top goalscorer in Takht Jamshid Cup in 1974–75 season along with Gholam Hossein Mazloumi and in 1977–78 season.
