= 1978–79 Takht Jamshid Cup =

Takht Jamshid Cup
- Season: 1978–79
- Champions: Not Completed
- Matches: 96

The 1978–79 season was the sixth and last season of the Takht Jamshid Cup of Iranian football. The competition was not completed due to the Iranian Revolution.

== Results ==
Pos	Team	Pld	W	D	L	Pts
1	Shahbaz	12	8	2	2	18
2	Persepolis	12	6	5	1	17
3	Taj	12	7	3	2	17
4	PAS Tehran	13	7	2	4	16
5	Niroo Ahvaz	13	4	7	2	15
6	Malavan	13	5	3	5	13
7	Machine Sazi	12	4	4	4	12
8	Bank Melli	12	3	6	3	12
9	Tractor Sazi	12	3	6	3	12
10	Sanat Naft Abadan F.C.	13	5	2	6	12
11	Bargh Shiraz	13	4	4	5	12
12	Zob Ahan	12	4	3	5	11
13	Rastakhiz Khoramshahr	13	4	2	7	10
14	Aboomoslem	13	3	3	7	9
15	Daraei F.C.	12	2	3	7	7
16	Homa F.C.	13	2	3	8	7
