= Jamshid Shahmohammadi =

Iranian footballer

Personal information
- Date of birth: 2 July 1968 (age 58)
- Place of birth: Iran
- Position: Forward

Senior career*
Years	Team	Apps	(Gls)
1987–1988	Persepolis		
1988–1991	Daraei		
1991–1993	Keshavarz		
1993–1995	Persepolis		
1995–1996	Saipa		
1996–1999	Bahman		
1999–2002	Electric Damavand		
2000	→Esteghlal Ahvaz (loan)		

International career
1992–1994	Iran	12	(1)

Managerial career
- 2010: Aboomoslem (assistant)
- 2011–2012: Paykan (assistant)
- 2012–2013: Zob Ahan (assistant)
- 2013–2014: Paykan (assistant)
- 2014: Persepolis B
- 2015: Rah Ahan (assistant)
- 2015–: Persepolis B
- * Club domestic league appearances and goals

Jamshid Shahmohammadi (born 2 July 1968) was an Iranian football forward who played for Iran in the 1992 Asian Cup. He also played for Keshavarz F.C.
