= Farshad Pious =

Iranian footballer (born 1962)

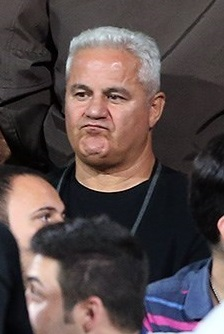
- Pious in Azadi Stadium

Personal information
- Date of birth: 12 January 1962 (age 64)
- Place of birth: Tehran, Iran
- Position: Forward

Team information
- Current team: Shenavar Sazi

Senior career*
Years	Team	Apps	(Gls)
1980–1983	Rah Ahan	28	(21)
1983–1984	Shahin	6	(5)
1984–1985	Nirooye Havaei	20	(24)
1985–1988	Persepolis	69	(60)
1988–1989	Al-Ahli	12	(9)
1989–1997	Persepolis	192	(169)
Total		327	(288)

International career
1984–1994	Iran	34	(18)

Managerial career
- 1998: Persepolis (Assistant)
- 2002–2003: Shahid Ghandi
- 2003–2004: Pas (Assistant)
- 2004–2005: Shamoushak Noshahr
- 2005–2007: Tractor
- 2007–2008: Homa
- 2009: Bargh Shiraz
- 2010–2012: Gol Gohar Sirjan
- 2012–2013: Sanat Sari
- 2014: Khoneh Be Khoneh
- 2015: Parseh
- 2016: Sepidrood
- 2019–2020: Chooka
- 2020–2021: Vista Toorbin
- 2021–2022: Shahrdari Astara
- 2022–2023: Damash
- 2023-2024: Sepidrood
- 2024-2025: Chooka
- 2025-: Shenavar Sazi
Medal record
Representing Iran
Asian Games
Gold medal – first place	1990 Beijing	Team competition
- * Club domestic league appearances and goals

Farshad Pious (Persian: فرشاد پیوس; born 12 January 1962) is an Iranian retired footballer who played as a forward for a number of clubs in Iran, most notably Persepolis, as well as the Iran national team. He is regarded as one of the best players in the history of Iranian football. He helped Persepolis win their only ever Asian Cup Winners' Cup in 1991 and also led them to a runners-up finish the following year. Pious was named the Iranian Football League top scorer on seven occasions. He is also Persepolis' greatest ever scorer with 153 goals in 211 games.

After football, Pious turned to managing. The first club he managed was Shahid Ghandi Yazd. The most famous club Pious managed was Tractor from 2005 to 2007.

== Club career ==
=== Early career ===
Pious was born in Tehran, Iran. He started his professional career with Rah Ahan in 1980, a year after the Iranian Revolution. Pious played three seasons with Rah Ahan in the Tehran Provincial League, which was the highest football league at the time. He scored 21 goals in 28 games during his time at Rah Ahan. He signed for Shahin in 1983, he scored five goals in six games before leaving the club. In 1984, Pious made a surprising move when he signed with 2nd Division club Nirooye Havaei. Pious showed his class and proved he belongs in a top club as he became the top scorer of the league with 20 goals in 24 games.

=== Persepolis ===
In 1985, Pious finally made his big move as he signed with Tehran giants Persepolis. In his first season Pious managed to score ten times in 14 games. Pious broke through in his second season as he scored 15 goals in 18 games across all competitions and was named Tehran Provincial League top scorer. His goals helped Persepolis win the league and also the Tehran Hazfi Cup. Pious was again key in the following season as he improved his scoring record and scored 19 times in 20 games and was again named the league's top scorer. With the help of Pious, Persepolis again won the Tehran Provincial League and also won the re-instated national cup the Hazfi Cup. In Pious' last season with Persepolis, he scored 16 goals in 16 games and was again named the league's top scorer.

=== Al Ahly ===
In 1989, Pious signed with Qatari club Al-Ahly Doha. In his only season at the club, Pious was named the league's top scorer with nine goals in 12 games and Al Ahly finished as runners-up.

=== Return to Persepolis ===
In the same season, Pious returned to his former club Persepolis. He had his worst season at Persepolis, only scoring five times in 12 games in the newly established Qods League, despite his scoring issues Pious still helped Persepolis to the final of the league where they lost to rivals Esteghlal 2–1 in one of the most important Tehran derby's. In 1990, there was no league in Iran and this allowed Pious and Persepolis to focus on the Asian Cup Winners' Cup he scored seven times in four games in the competition and helped Persepolis claim their first ever continental title with a 1–0 win in the final over Muharraq. In the 1991–92 season, Pious scored 11 times in 22 games in the newly established Azadegan League and was named top scorer as Persepolis finished third, three points behind champions Pas Tehran. In the 1992–93 season, Persepolis again competed in the Asian Cup Winners' Cup. Pious scored 1 goal in four games as Persepolis went to the final but lost to Japanese club Nissan 2–1 on aggregate. In the same season in the Azadegan League, Pious fared no better, scoring four goals in 12 games as Persepolis lost in the final to Pas Tehran on penalties. In the 1993–94 season Persepolis again finished as runners-up in the Azadegan League. Pious' eight goals in 13 games was not enough as the club finished three points behind champions Saipa. The 1994–95 season was arguably Pious' best season at the club, he scored 20 times in 22 games and was the league's top scorer. Pious' goals helped Persepolis reach the semi-final where they faced rivals Esteghlal in the Tehran derby. In the first leg Pious scored in the 51st minute as the game ended in a 2–2 draw. In the second leg the match finished 0–0 meaning Esteghlal advanced on the away goals rule. In 1996, Pious finally won the elusive Azadegan League, Pious only managed to score four times in 15 games but the club still went on to win their first ever Azadegan League. The 1996–97 season was Pious' last season and he only managed to play six games and scored five times as he battle through injury. Persepolis still won the Azadegan League for the second time in a row and also finished third place in the Asian Club Championship. Pious ended his career at Persepolis as one of the club's greatest ever players and the club's greatest ever scorer with 153 goals in 211 games.

== International career ==
Pious made his debut for the Iran national team on 25 June 1984 in a friendly against China, and his last cap was on 9 October 1994 in Asian Games against Yemen. Pious helped Iran win gold at the 1990 Asian Games, Iran went undefeated through the entire tournament and beat North Korea in the final on penalties.

== Managerial career ==
Pious was head coach of Azadegan League side Tractor between 2005 and 2007 for two seasons. Before Tractor he was the head coach of Shamoushak Noshahr until he resigned on 29 May 2005.

== Personal life ==
On 9 February 2026, in the midst of the 2025–2026 Iranian protests, Pious publicly objected to being included on a list of supporters of the Islamic Revolution by the Ministry of Sport and Youth, ahead of the Revolution's anniversary.

== Career statistics ==
Scores and results list Iran's goal tally first, score column indicates score after each Pious goal.

List of international goals scored by Farshad Pious
No.	Date	Venue	Opponent	Score	Result	Competition
1	20 September 1986	Seoul, South Korea	Thailand		4–0	Friendly
2	24 September 1986	Hanbat Stadium, Daejeon, South Korea	Bangladesh		4–0	1986 Asian Games
3	2 December 1988	Hamad bin Khalifa Stadium, Doha, Qatar	Qatar		2–0	1988 AFC Asian Cup
4	8 December 1988	Suheim bin Hamad Stadium, Doha, Qatar	United Arab Emirates		1–0	1988 AFC Asian Cup
5	20 January 1989	Azadi Stadium, Tehran, Iran	Japan		2–2	Friendly
6	30 May 1989	Azadi Stadium, Tehran, Iran	Thailand		3–0	1990 FIFA World Cup qualification
7	30 May 1989	Azadi Stadium, Tehran, Iran	Thailand		3–0	1990 FIFA World Cup qualification
8	22 July 1989	Azadi Stadium, Tehran, Iran	China		3–2	1990 FIFA World Cup qualification
9	24 September 1990	Fengtai Stadium, Beijing, China	Malaysia		3–0	1990 Asian Games
10	24 September 1990	Fengtai Stadium, Beijing, China	Malaysia		3–0	1990 Asian Games
11	24 September 1990	Fengtai Stadium, Beijing, China	Malaysia		3–0	1990 Asian Games
12	28 September 1990	Xiannongtan Stadium, Beijing, China	North Korea		2–1	1990 Asian Games
13	11 May 1992	Salt Lake Stadium, Kolkata, India	Pakistan		7–0	1992 AFC Asian Cup qualification
14	13 May 1992	Salt Lake Stadium, Kolkata, India	India		3–0	1992 AFC Asian Cup qualification
15	13 May 1992	Salt Lake Stadium, Kolkata, India	India		3–0	1992 AFC Asian Cup qualification
16	18 October 1992	Al-Sadaqua Walsalam Stadium, Kuwait City, Kuwait	Kuwait		1–1	Friendly
17	30 October 1992	Bingo Stadium, Onomichi, Japan	North Korea		2–0	1992 AFC Asian Cup
18	9 October 1994	Athletic Stadium, Miyoshi, Japan	Yemen		4–0	1994 Asian Games

== Honours ==
=== Player ===
Persepolis

- Iranian Football League: 1995–96, 1996–97; runner-up: 1989–90, 1992–93, 1993–94
- Hazfi Cup: 1987–88, 1991–92
- Tehran Province League: 1986–87, 1987–88, 1989–90, 1990–91; runner-up: 1991-92
- Tehran Hazfi Cup: 1986–87
- Asian Cup Winners' Cup: 1990–91; runner-up: 1992–93

Iran

- Asian Games Gold Medal: 1990

=== Manager ===
Shahid Ghandi Yazd

- Iran Second Division: 2002–03 (promotion)

Khoneh Be Khoneh Mazandaran

- Iran Third Division: 2013–14 (promotion)

Sepidrood

- Iran Second Division: 2015–16 (promotion)

Chooka Talesh

- Iran Second Division: 2019–20 (promotion)

=== Individual ===
- Asian Games top goalscorer: 1990
- Iranian Football League top goalscorer: 1991–92, 1994–95
- Tehran Province League top goalscorer: 1986–87, 1987–88, 1988–89, 1990–91, 1991–92
- Qatar Stars League top goalscorer: 1988–89
- IFCA Best Second Division Manager: 2015–16
