= Gholamhossein Mazloumi =

Iranian footballer and coach (1950–2014)

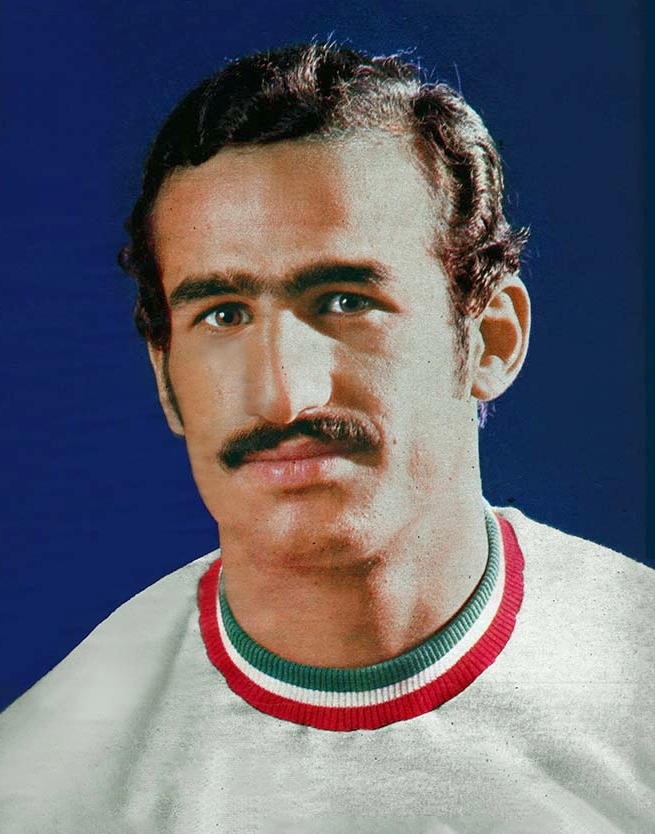
- Mazloumi in 1974

Personal information
- Full name: Gholamhossein Mazloumi Tangestani
- Date of birth: 13 January 1950
- Place of birth: Abadan, Iran
- Date of death: 19 November 2014 (aged 64)
- Place of death: Tehran, Iran
- Height: 1.82 m (6 ft 0 in)
- Position: Striker

Youth career
- 1962–1965: Taj Masjed Soleiman

Senior career*
Years	Team	Apps	(Gls)
1965–1968	Taj Abadan		
1968–1975	Taj		
1975–1978	Shahbaz		

International career
1969–1977	Iran	40	(19)

Managerial career
- 1980–1988: Esteghlal (youth)
- 1988–1989: Esteghlal
- 1989–1990: Iran U-20
- 1993–1995: Esteghlal Ahvaz
- 1995–1997: Moghavemat Tehran
- 1997–1999: Petroshimi Mahshahr
- 1999–2000: Payam Tehran
Medal record
Representing Iran
AFC Asian Cup
Winner	1972
Winner	1976
Asian Games
Gold medal – first place	1974
- * Club domestic league appearances and goals

Gholamhossein Mazloumi (Persian: غلام‌حسین مظلومی; 13 January 1950 – 19 November 2014), nicknamed Sar Talaei ("Golden Head"), was an Iranian football player, coach and football administrator.

He played for three clubs including Taj Abadan, Taj Tehran (Esteghlal), and Shahbaz FC, as well as the Iranian national team and the national youth team of Iran. He also managed Esteghlal from 1988 to 1989. During his time as a football player, he scored 37 goals for the Iran national football team and was Iran's all-time top scorer for twelve years before his record being broken by Ali Daei. He was the top scorer at the 1974 Asian Games and the 1976 AFC Asian Cup.

He was chairman of Shahin Bushehr from 2011 until 2013 and also honorary deputy chairman of Esteghlal. He died on 19 November 2014 after being diagnosed with stomach cancer two years earlier.

== Honours ==
=== Club ===
- Iran Football League: 1970 , 1975
- Tehran Football League: 1971 , 1972
- AFC Champions League: 1970

=== National ===
- AFC Asian Cup: 1972 , 1976
- Asian Games: 1974

=== Individuals ===
- Iran Football League Golden Boot: 1974 , 1975 , 1977
- AFC Champions League top goalscorer: 1970
- AFC Asian Cup top goalscorer: 1976
- Asian Games top goalscorer: 1974
- AFC Champions League Player of the Tournament: 1970
- Asian Games Player of the Tournament: 1974
- Asian Striker of the Year: 1974
- AFC U-20 Asian Cup top goalscorer: 1969

== Early life ==
Gholam Hossein Mazloumi was born on 13 January 1950 in Abadan, Iran. He had two sisters and six brothers. One of them, Parviz, also became a professional football player and coach.

== Club career ==
Mazloumi was one of the key players of Taj Tehran. He won the Asian Club Championship in the 1969–70 season, as well as the Iranian league in 1970–71 and 1974–75, and he reached the second place in 1973–74. Mazloumi is considered to be one of the finest strikers in Iranian football history as evidenced by total goal tally for the national team scoring the most goals in the fewest caps. Mazloumi was a great finisher, rarely missing sure-goal opportunities.

In this period he became the Iranian league's top goalscorer in two consecutive seasons of 1973–74 and 1974–75. He was the top goalscorer again in the 1976–77 season when he was playing as one of the key players for Shahbaz reaching the third place in that season. He retired in 1978 at the age of 28 due to an injury.

== International career ==
Mazloumi made his debut for the Iran national team in September 1969 in a match against Pakistan. He has a total of 40 caps and 19 goals for Team Melli.

Mazloumi won three major tournaments with the Iran national team, including the 1972 Asian Cup, the football tournament of the 1974 Asian Games in Tehran as well as the 1976 Asian Cup in Tehran as one of the top scorers. He also participated in the 1976 Olympics in Montreal, when Iran reached the quarterfinals.

== Career statistics ==
=== International goals ===
Scores and results list Iran's goal tally first, score column indicates score after each Mazloumi goal.

List of international goals scored by Gholam Hossein Mazloumi
No.	Date	Venue	Opponent	Score	Result	Competition
1	13 September 1969	19 Mayıs Stadium, Ankara, Turkey	Pakistan		4–2	1969 RCD Cup
2	13 September 1969	19 Mayıs Stadium, Ankara, Turkey	Pakistan		4–2	1969 RCD Cup
3	1 February 1972	Panathinaikos Stadium, Athens, Greece	Kuwait		2–0	1972 Olympic Games qualification
4	3 September 1974	Amjadieh Stadium, Tehran, Iran	Pakistan		7–0	1974 Asian Games
5	3 September 1974	Amjadieh Stadium, Tehran, Iran	Pakistan		7–0	1974 Asian Games
6	3 September 1974	Amjadieh Stadium, Tehran, Iran	Pakistan		7–0	1974 Asian Games
7	11 September 1974	Aryamehr Stadium, Tehran, Iran	South Korea		2–0	1974 Asian Games
8	11 September 1974	Aryamehr Stadium, Tehran, Iran	South Korea		2–0	1974 Asian Games
9	10 August 1975	Aryamehr Stadium, Tehran, Iran	Hungary		1–2	Friendly
10	20 August 1975	Amjadieh Stadium, Tehran, Iran	Bahrain		3–0	1976 Olympic Games qualification
11	20 August 1975	Amjadieh Stadium, Tehran, Iran	Bahrain		3–0	1976 Olympic Games qualification
12	22 August 1975	Amjadieh Stadium, Tehran, Iran	Saudi Arabia		3–0	1976 Olympic Games qualification
13	22 August 1975	Amjadieh Stadium, Tehran, Iran	Saudi Arabia		3–0	1976 Olympic Games qualification
14	3 June 1976	Aryamehr Stadium, Tehran, Iran	South Yemen		8–0	1976 AFC Asian Cup
15	3 June 1976	Aryamehr Stadium, Tehran, Iran	South Yemen		8–0	1976 AFC Asian Cup
16	3 June 1976	Aryamehr Stadium, Tehran, Iran	South Yemen		8–0	1976 AFC Asian Cup
17	20 July 1976	Lansdowne Park, Ottawa, Canada	Cuba		1–0	1976 Summer Olympics
18	7 January 1977	Al-Malaz Stadium, Riyadh, Saudi Arabia	Saudi Arabia		3–0	1978 FIFA World Cup qualification
19	7 January 1977	Al-Malaz Stadium, Riyadh, Saudi Arabia	Saudi Arabia		3–0	1978 FIFA World Cup qualification

== Post-playing career ==
After he retired, he became head coach of Esteghlal's youth team in 1980. In 1988, he was promoted as first team manager, replacing Abbas Razavi. Esteghlal finished third in Mazloumi's first season in charge. He left the club after playing two games in his second season and was replaced with Mansour Pourheidari. He later managed Iran national under-20 football team, Esteghlal Ahvaz, Moghavemat Tehran, Petrochimi Mahshahr and Payam Tehran.

He later became team manager of Esteghlal. He was elected as chairman of Shahin Bushehr on 24 July 2011 but resigned on 20 July 2013 due to his illness. He was diagnosed with stomach cancer in 2012 and died on 19 November 2014 in Naja Hospital in Tehran. He was 64 and was deputy chairman of Esteghlal at the time of his death. Mazloumi is survived by his wife, four children and three grandchildren.
