= Safar Iranpak =

Iranian footballer

Personal information
- Full name: Safar Iranpak
- Date of birth: 23 December 1946
- Place of birth: Masjed Soleyman, Iran
- Date of death: 30 January 2009 (aged 62)
- Place of death: Stockholm, Sweden
- Position: Striker

Youth career
- 1960–1962: Shahin Ahvaz

Senior career*
Years	Team	Apps	(Gls)
1961–1970	Shahin Ahvaz	98	(23)
1970–1980	Persepolis	143	(74)
Total		241	(97)

International career
1971–1975	Iran	19	(3)
- * Club domestic league appearances and goals

Safar Iranpak (23 December 1946 – 30 January 2009) was an Iranian football striker who played for Persepolis and the Iran national football team.

== Early life ==
Iranpark was born in Masjed Soleyman on 23 December 1946. He started his playing career for his hometown team Shahin Ahvaz at the age of 12.

== Club career ==
Iranpark was promoted to the first team squad of Shahin Ahvaz and joined Persepolis in summer 1968. He played twelve seasons for Persepolis and is the best goalscorer at Tehran derby. He is also the third all-time goalscorer of Persepolis.

== International career ==
Safar Iranpak (seated) beside his teammates Behzadi and Kalani

He represented the Iran national football team in 1971 and was a part of the title winning team at the 1972 AFC Asian Cup. One of his best international games was against North Korea, where he scored twice and led Iran to qualify for the 1972 Summer Olympics. He retired from national football in 1975.

== After retirement and death ==
After he retired from football in 1980, he moved to Stockholm, Sweden where he died on 30 January 2009 from lung cancer. His body was sent to Ahwaz to be buried in the Behesht-Abad cemetery.

== Honours ==
=== Club ===
- Iranian Football League:
  - Winners (3): 1971–72 1973–74, 1975–76
  - Runners-up (3): 1974–75, 1976–77, 1977–78
- Espandi Cup:
  - Winner: 1979

=== International ===
- AFC Asian Cup:
  - Winners (1): 1972

== See also ==
- Safar Iranpak at National-Football-Teams.com
