= History of Persepolis F.C. =

The history of Persepolis F.C. begins from the football club's founding in 1967 (1963; as Persepolis Amateur team) up until the present day. Persepolis F.C., also known as Red Army, is based in Tehran, Iran.

Persepolis was founded in 1967 by Ali Abdo and has been in the first division of Iranian football since 1968. Persepolis also had three teams in bowling, basketball and volleyball in its first years of establishment. Persepolis F.C. is the football club of the multisport Persepolis Athletic and Cultural Club. The club has played at its home ground, Azadi Stadium, since 1973. They contest the Tehran derby, which is regarded as one of the biggest in Asia, with archrivals Esteghlal, a match that is always closely followed by Iranian football fans. According to the Asian Football Confederation, Persepolis is the most popular football club in Asia.

== Shahin F.C. (1942–1967) ==
Shahin F.C.Many of the players shown in this photo went on to play for Persepolis.

Shahin was established in 1942 by Dr. Abbas Ekrami, a teacher. Ekrami founded the club with help of some young students under the motto:

اول اخلاق، دوم درس، سوم ورزش
Ethics first, education second, sports third.

— Shahin F.C. Motto

Shahin produced many talented players like Parviz Dehdari, Masoud Boroumand, Homayoun Behzadi, Jafar Kashani, Hossein Kalani, Hamid Shirzadegan, and many more that played for Iran national football team. These talents made Shahin popular in the 1960s but its very popularity was viewed as a threat by the Iran Football Federation and the Keihan Varzeshi newspaper (Iran's most important sports publication at the time). The conflict between them became worse and on 9 July 1967, two days after Shahin's 3–0 win against Tehranjavan F.C., the Iran Sports Organization declared Shahin F.C. as dissolved. League attendance dropped and other clubs including Pas, Rah Ahan, and Oghab tried to sign Shahin players.

== Establishment early years (1963–1969) ==
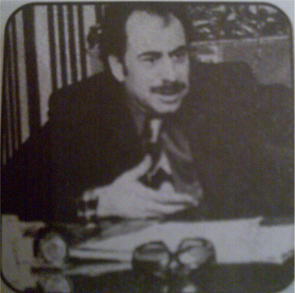
Ali Abdo, founder and first chairman of the club.

Persepolis squad in the 1960s

Persepolis Athletic and Cultural Club was established in 1963 by Ali Abdo. Abdo had returned to Iran from the United States and was a championship boxer.

Persepolis F.C. started the 1968 season with Parviz Dehdari as manager. Despite the efforts to sign and disperse Shahin players to various clubs, Parviz Dehdari and Masoud Boroumand transferred the popularity of Shahin to Persepolis F.C. by taking most Shahin Players to join Persepolis. The team was initially quite weak, and participated in the 2nd division of the country. The best player on the team then was Mahmoud Khordbin.

The club, using four Shahin players, had a friendly match with Jam Abadan, a respected team at the time. After the match the remainder of the Shahin players joined Persepolis. That year no league competition was held, as many teams had been dissolved, so a 44-team tournament was held, and Persepolis, along with Pas, Taj, and Oghab finished top of the group.

The next year they represented as the first Iranian club in the Asian Champion Club Tournament held in Thailand, but they were not successful and were eliminated in the group stage.

== Takht Jamshid Cup (1969–1979) ==
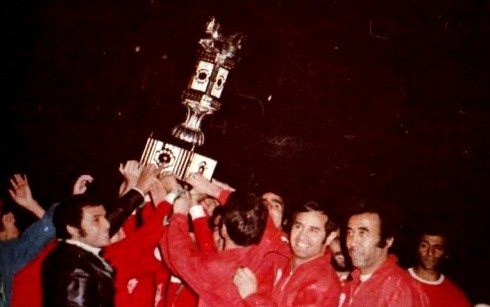
Persepolis winning the Takht Jamshid Cup in 1973

In 1962, the Iran Universal (Iran National "Iran Nacional") automobile factory was opened. In 1969, The boss of the factory, Mahmoud Khayami, who was also the owner of a football team, was a big fan of Shahin. Khayami, who wanted to improve his football team, entered into negotiations with Persepolis and was able to get all the former Shahin players except Aziz Asli and Mahmoud Khordbin to join his new team, Paykan Tehran F.C. Paykan won the championship that year, but the new players moved back to Persepolis at the end of the season.

In 1971, Persepolis won its first ever championship in the Iranian League. Persepolis had an impressive season with 13 wins and 1 draw, in 14 weeks. In 1972, Abdo announced Persepolis as the first professional football club in Iran. The club did not enter the domestic league and only played against foreign clubs, and a few months later it became amateur again Next year the Takht Jamshid Cup was established. Persepolis won the inaugural Takht Jamshid Cup in 1973 and won it again in 1975. In the third year of establishment of Takhte Jamshid cup Persepolis lost just two matches of thirty matches of that year. Persepolis is the most successful club in the Takht Jamshid Cup league, clinching two championship titles and finishing three times as runner-up.

== Success under tough conditions (1979–1990) ==
From left to right: Safar Iranpak, Homayoun Behzadi and Hossein Kalani: Persepolis players in the Takht Jamshid Cup

When the Iranian Revolution took place in 1979, Abdo returned to United States. Although Persepolis won the Espandi Cup, the club fell apart and many of the old players did not return. The club's property was sequestered by The Oppressed and Veterans Foundation (Persian: بنیاد مستضعفان و جانبازان) and the club placed under the responsibility of The Physical Education Department (Persian: سازمان تربیت بدنی) of Iran.

In 1981, the Physical Education Department declared that the name of the club would change, but club officials, players, and fans opposed the move. The team didn't appear in the match against Homa in the Tehran league as a protest against the Physical Education Department. They lost the match 3–0 by default and Homa became champion. In 1986, The club was taken over by the Oppressed and Veterans Foundation and renamed Azadi (meaning "freedom", Persian: آزادی). Players declared that they wouldn't play for the club if the name change went through. After a brief period the Foundation did not want the club any more, and it was taken over by the Physical Education Department again. On 16 February 1987, the Physical Education Department renamed the club Pirouzi (meaning "victory", Persian: پیروزی) with players' agreement, although fans still call the team by its original name, Persepolis. On 10 April 2012 the club chairman Mohammad Rouyanian announced that the club will officially only be known as Persepolis.

In the 1980s the club only played in the Tehran League and various elimination tournaments. Persepolis was successful during this time and maintained its popularity, winning the Tehran League five seasons in a row. During all that time, Ali Parvin served as player-manager.

== Revitalization (1990–2001) ==
The 1990s were a dream decade for the team, with four league championships, two Hazfi Cups, dozens of great players, and renewed support. At one point more than six Persepolis players were starters on Iran's national team. The team won the national championship in the 1995–96 season. At one point in that season they were 10 points behind Bahman. They came back and finished first, six points ahead of the league runner-up. They won the league again the next season, again finishing ahead of the runner up by six points. They were stopped by the Korean side Pohang Steelers in the semi-finals of the Asian Champions' Cup. Persepolis finished third, defeating Iraq's Al-Zawraa in the third place match.

The next season they showed good form again, but due to their commitments in the Asian Champions' Cup and the large number of national team players they had, they withdrew from the league. The poor scheduling and mismanagement of both the I.R.I.F.F. and AFC officials led to this unprofessional event. This prevented Persepolis from possibly winning a third consecutive league championship. Persepolis did not have much luck in the Asian Champion's cup either, as they were once again stopped in the semi-finals, this time by Chinese club, Dalian Wanda. They lost the third place match as well to Al-Hilal.

The 1996–97 and 1997–98 Persepolis teams are considered by many to be among the greatest Iranian clubs to ever play. National team players and future superstars such as Ahmadreza Abedzadeh, Khodadad Azizi, Karim Bagheri, Ali Daei, Mehdi Mahdavikia, Mehrdad Minavand, Ali Karimi and many more were among the players who played for the club in those years.

After the World Cup 1998, several of Persepolis' best players were transferred to European clubs, but Persepolis was able to keep a talented squad. Future national team members Ali Karimi and Hamed Kavianpour would join the team at this time. They won the 1998–99 championship as well as the Hazfi Cup that season. They also won the 1999–2000 league championship, finishing third again in the Asian Champions Cup. This would be their last championship in the Azadegan League era.

Most of Persepolis' championships at the time were won while Ali Parvin was the manager, and Amirali Abedini was the chairman.

== IPL era (2001–present) ==
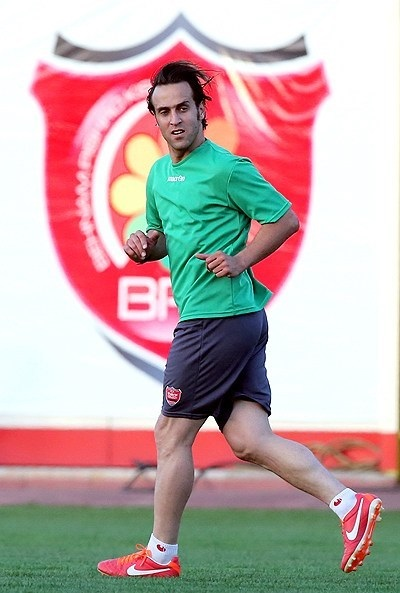
Ali Karimi played for the team on three occasions, first time in 1998 and left the team in 2013

Persepolis entered the newly established IPL looking to dominate once again, but near the end of the season they were in a very close race with their rival Esteghlal. Esteghlal led the league by two points going into the final day of the regular season. Esteghlal's loss to Malavan and Persepolis' 1–0 win against Fajr Sepasi in their last games of the season gave Persepolis a one-point lead and another championship. Their 2001–02 season championship made them the first-ever IPL champions. The 2002–03 season proved to be extremely difficult and Persepolis finished third, never managing to come close to the eventual winners, Sepahan. They also fell apart in the newly created AFC Champions League, failing to advance out of the group stage.

When Akbar Ghamkhar took over as club chairman, he made several changes in an effort to improve the team. He made public the amount of player and staff salaries, severely angering Parvin, the highest paid player on the team. Ghamkhar hired coach Vinko Begović, and entered into contracts with several prominent players. Persepolis started off very well in the 2003–04 season but things deteriorated. Begovic left the team and German manager Rainer Zobel was bought in. Parvin was brought back, taking the position of technical director. The club finished fifth in the standings in the 2004–05 season.

Ghamkhar was replaced with Hojatollah Khatib. He decided to bring back Parvin. The club experienced major financial problems as some of the spending decisions made in previous years had overextended the club. Persepolis finished the 2005–06 season in ninth place, the lowest it had ever placed. Parvin left the club in February 2006, vowing to never return to Persepolis, after a 4–2 loss to Fajr Sepasi in Azadi Stadium. After the game, the fans began cursing at Ali Parvin and the players.

Khatib resigned as chairman and Mohammad Hassan Ansarifard was elected to the post by the club council. Arie Haan was brought in as the new manager, helping the team make it to the 2005–06 Hazfi Cup final, but he was fired by the club just before the 2006–07 season began. Turkish manager Mustafa Denizli signed with the team on 17 August 2006. With the final cup match being his first one as the club's manager, Denizli was not able to help the club win the Hazfi Cup in 2006, a cup that the team needed to gain entry into the Asian Champion's League and to receive financial benefits by doing so.

The club did not win the Hazfi Cup the next year either, losing to Sepahan in the semifinals in June 2007. The club finished third in the IPL 2006–07, and Denizli left the club after Ansarifard resigned as chairman in June 2007.

=== Afshin Ghotbi: Emperor epoch ===
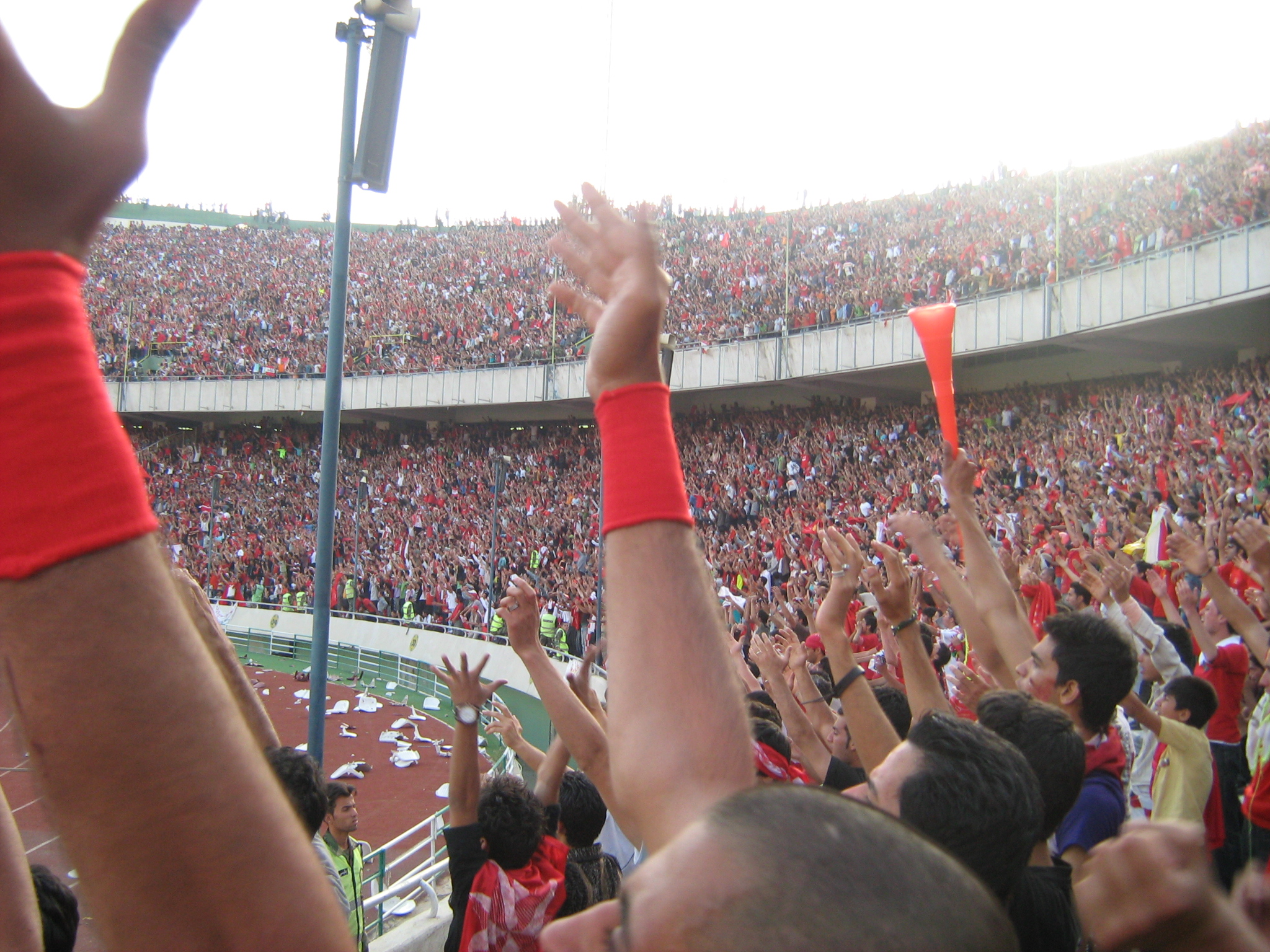
17 May 2008: After winning the title in the 2007–08 season

Habib Kashani became the club chairman in June 2007 and selected Afshin Ghotbi as head coach of Persepolis for the 2007–08 season. Ghotbi Promised to lead Persepolis to the IPL championship and started the IPL with a 3–2 win over Sanat Naft. Persepolis was undefeated until the 17th round, where they suffered a 2–1 loss to Sepahan. On 9 January 2008, the disciplinary committee of the Iranian Football Federation announced because of a serious injury to a security soldier by the Sepahan fans, Sepahan would be charged with a five-point deduction. This was later reduced to three points. Persepolis was also docked six points by FIFA because of unpaid wages to a number of former players. This placed Persepolis behind Sepahan in the standings. Near the end of the season Sheys Rezaei and Mohammad Reza Mamani were expelled by the team after both players showed poor behavior towards club players, coaches, and management as well as other non-football-related issues. Habib Kashani and Mahmoud Khordbin both suffered heart attacks. Persepolis cut Sepahan's seven-point lead to two points by the last game of the season.

In the last week, Persepolis defeated Sepahan when Sepehr Heidari scored a 90+6th-minute goal in front of over 110,000 fans in Azadi Stadium to give Persepolis its second championship in the IPL and a berth in the Asian Champions League. In the 2007–2008 Golden Ball award ceremony Persepolis, Afshin Ghotbi, and Mohsen Khalili won the Team, Manager, and Player of the year titles.

Ghotbi's contract expired at the end of the season and he decided to leave the club. His assistant, Hamid Estili, was very close to management but, Kashani and other club officials resigned because of conflicts between them and the Iran Physical Education Department. Dariush Mostafavi was selected as club chairman. Mostafavi promised to bring Ghotbi back. Negotiations were successful, and on 4 July 2008, Ghotbi signed a two-year contract with Persepolis. Ghotbi had many problems with Mostafavi and resigned on 19 November 2008. When talking to the popular Iranian show 90, Ghotbi showed tears before leaving Persepolis and the fans that loved him who had given him the nickname Emperor.

However, Ghotbi left the team in mid-season after a series of losses and eventually became head coach of the Iran national football team.

Due to the mismanagement of the club, Persepolis had underachieved in the recent seasons of the Iran Pro League. The selection of incompetent coaches, and the acquisition of low quality players have enhanced the present deep in form. After the resignation of Ghotbi, his assistant Afshin Peyrovani was named as interim head coach of the club, led the team in 11 matches in Iran Pro League but he was replaced with former Portugal and Saudi Arabia manager, Nelo Vingada. Vingada's contract was terminated at the end of the season.

=== Daei years ===
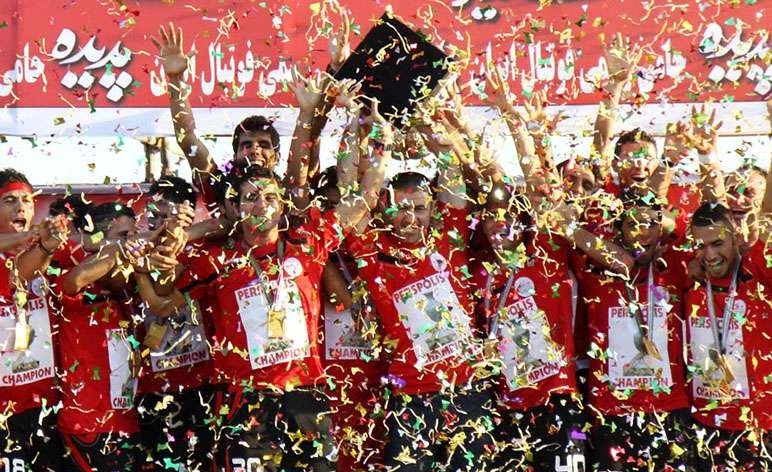
Persepolis players celebration after winning the 2010–11 Hazfi Cup

After Vingada was sacked as head coach of the club, former Croatia and Dinamo Zagreb manager, Zlatko Kranjčar was hired as his successor but he was soon replaced with former Persepolis and Iran national football team captain, Ali Daei. At the end of the 2009–10 Season, Persepolis finished fourth in the league but they became Hazfi Cup champions. In the Hazfi Cup final, Persepolis defeated Azadegan League side Gostaresh Foolad Tabriz 4–1 on aggregate to qualify for the 2011 AFC Champions League. In the 2010–11 season, Persepolis finished fourth in the league and was eliminated in the group stage of the 2011 AFC Champions League but at the end of the season Persepolis won the 2010–11 Hazfi Cup after defeating rivals Sepahan, Foolad and Malavan. The technical committee chose Hamid Estili as Daei's successor on that day. Under the management of Daei, Persepolis won back to back trophies for the first time in 13 seasons.

After Daei's resignation, Hamid Estili, Mustafa Denizli, Manuel José and most recently Yahya Golmohammadi managed Persepolis for a record 4 head coaches in only two seasons. Golmohammadi led Persepolis to the final of the Hazfi Cup, but losing to Sepahan on penalties. After the Hazfi Cup, Golmohammadi announced that he would not be managing Persepolis the following season.

However, Daei returned to the club and signed a three years contract before the start of 2013–14 season. Under Daei Persepolis finished second with 55 points, 2 points behind Champions Foolad. Persepolis retained its place in the AFC Champions League after a two-year absence.

After a poor start to the 2014–15 season which left Persepolis in 9th place, Daei was sacked and was replaced by Hamid Derakhshan. Derakhshan's performance was criticized by the fans.

=== The Ivanković Era ===
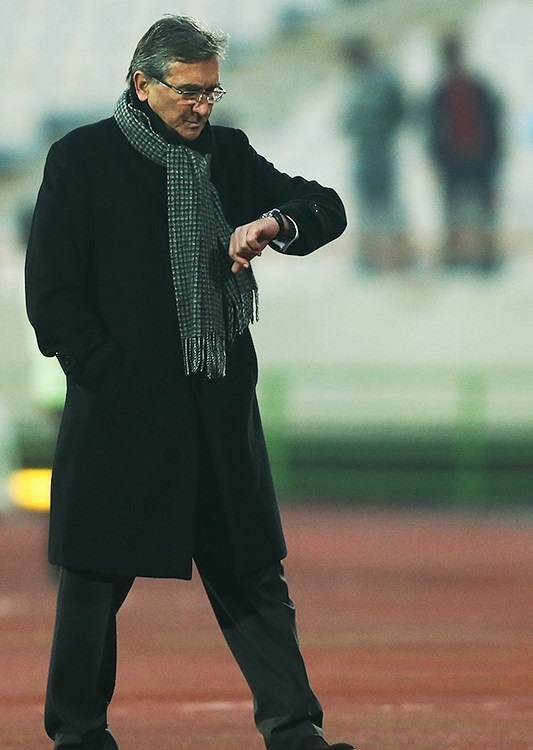
Ivanković coaching Persepolis against Gostaresh in 2015

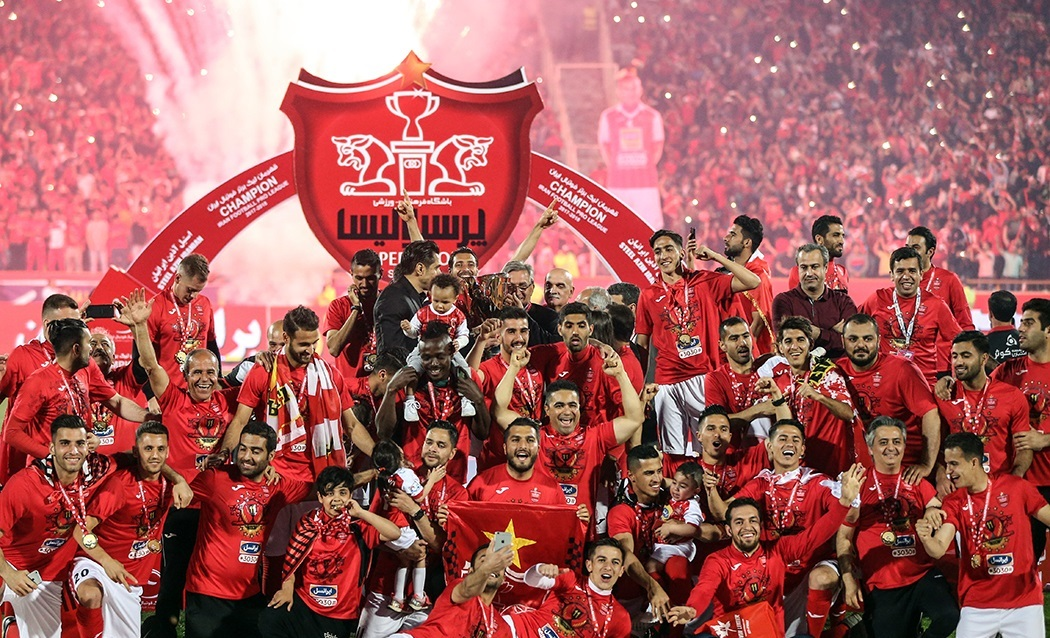
Persepolis players celebrating winning 2017–18 season

On 5 April 2015, Hamid Derakhshan resigned as head coach of Persepolis and was temporarily replaced by Hossein Abdi. On the following day, former Iran national football team manager Branko Ivanković was named as new head coach of the club.

On 15 May 2015 Ivanković won his first Tehran derby after a 1–0 victory over Esteghlal. Later that week on 19 May 2015 Persepolis defeated Al-Hilal 1–0 in the first leg of AFC Champions League round of 16. In the second leg they lost 3–0 against Al-Hilal and were eliminated.

After the departure of Mohammad Nouri, the club named Hadi Norouzi as the captain for the 2015–16 season. Persepolis was also very active in the summer transfer season, adding Iranian international Ramin Rezaeian, Croatian defender Luka Marić and Honduras international Jerry Bengtson.

On 1 October 2015, the club captain Hadi Norouzi died in his sleep at the age of 30 after an apparent heart attack. His death caused a profound shock in Iranian sports.

After the death of Hadi Norouzi Persepolis improved their form and their long unbeaten streak propelled them to the top 3 midway through the season. After a historic 4–2 win against Esteghlal in the Tehran derby, the team moved into first place. However, after a loss to Naft Tehran on 28 April, the team dropped down to third place. Persepolis won the following week match against Gostaresh Foolad and moved into second place, behind Esteghlal Khuzestan on goal difference. A final day win on 13 May 2016 against Rah Ahan was not enough for Persepolis as Esteghlal Khuzestan also won and were crowned champions of Persian Gulf Pro League 2015–16.

Before the 2016–17 season, Persepolis added national team members Alireza Beiranvand, Jalal Hosseini, and Vahid Amiri. Persepolis started the season strong and never dropped below third place. They set records for least ever goals conceded and most ever points accumulated after 17 weeks in a Persian Gulf Pro League season. On April 15, 2017, Persepolis became the champions of the season with three weeks remaining to the end of the season. After a victory against Machine Sazi, Persepolis claimed its third championship in the Persian Gulf Pro League and its 10th championship in total. Persepolis defended its championship in the Persian Gulf Pro League 2017–18 and won Super cup.

On 30 May 2017 Persepolis made history again after advancing to the Quarterfinals after defeating Qatari club Lekhwiya 1–0 in the AFC Champions League Round of 16. This was the first time in club history that Persepolis made Quarterfinals in the current Champions League format. Persepolis beat Saudi club Al Ahli 5–3 on aggregate to make it to the Semifinals, where they lost to Al Hilal 6–2 on aggregate. the following year Persepolis advanced to AFC Champions League Final in 2018 and lost 2–0 in First-leg. Persepolis were held to a goalless draw by Kashima Antlers of Japan in the second leg of the AFC Champions League. On 16 May 2019, Branko Ivanković made another history with Persepolis by hat-trick of championship of Iran premier football league in Persian Gulf Pro League. However, he left the club at the end of season after 4 years, winning a record 7 trophies for a foreign coach.

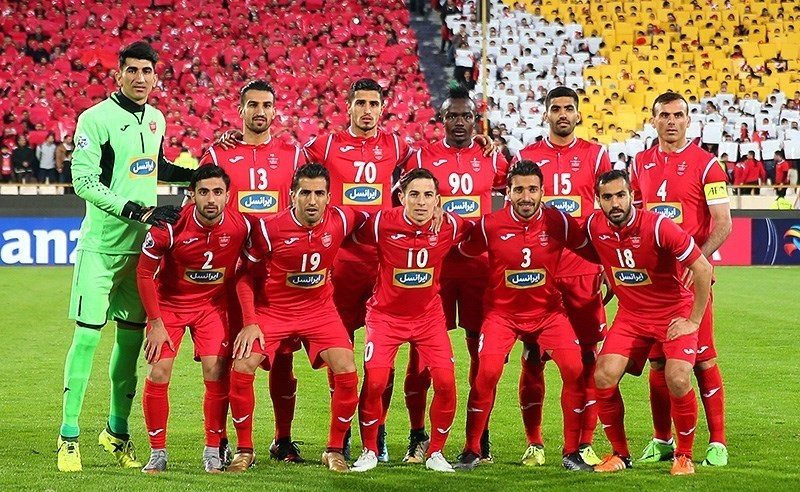
Group photograph of Persepolis in February 2018

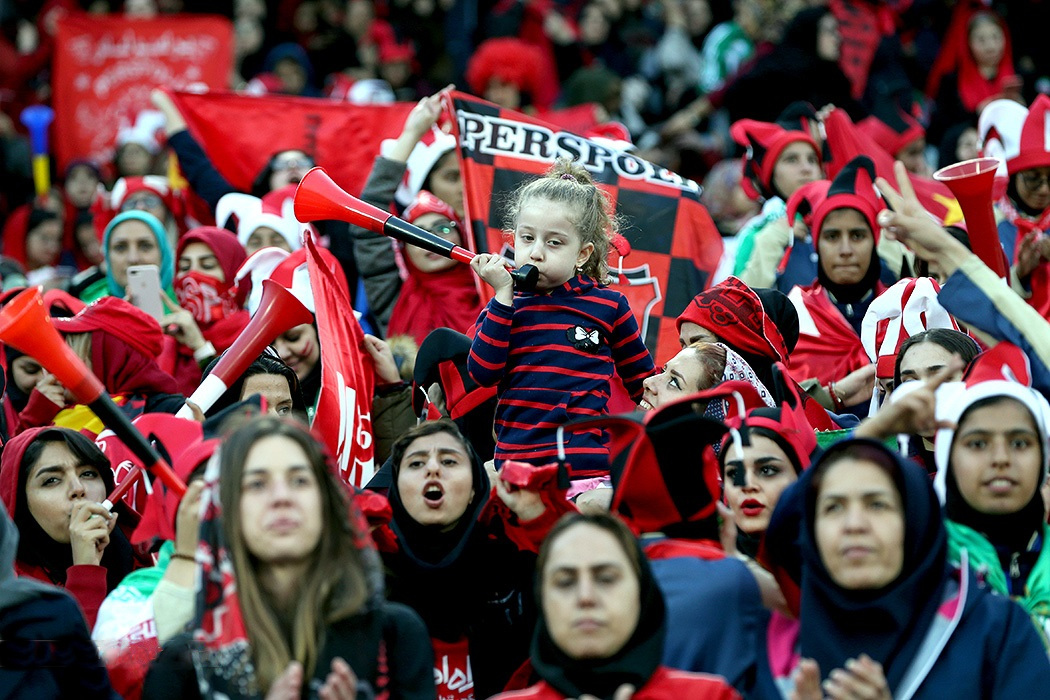
2018 AFC Champions League Final

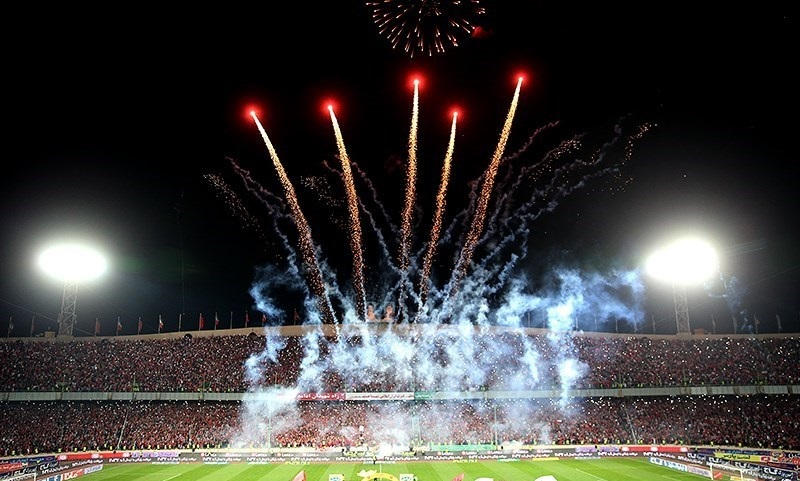
2016–17 Persian Gulf Pro League

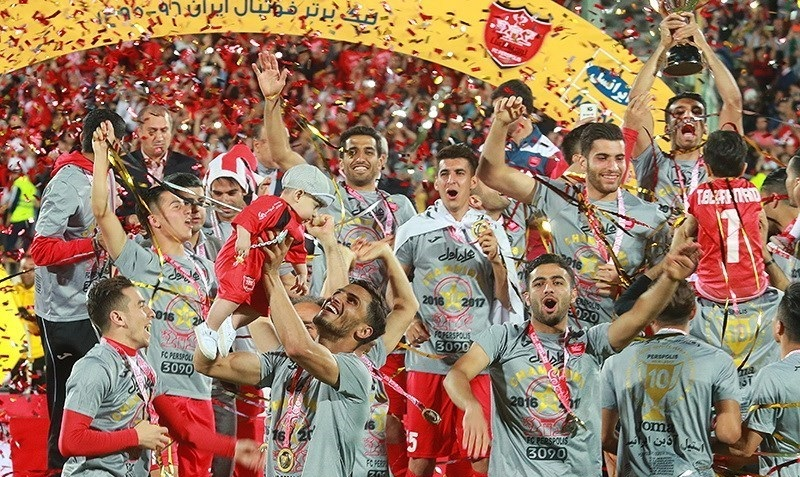
2016–17 Persian Gulf Pro League

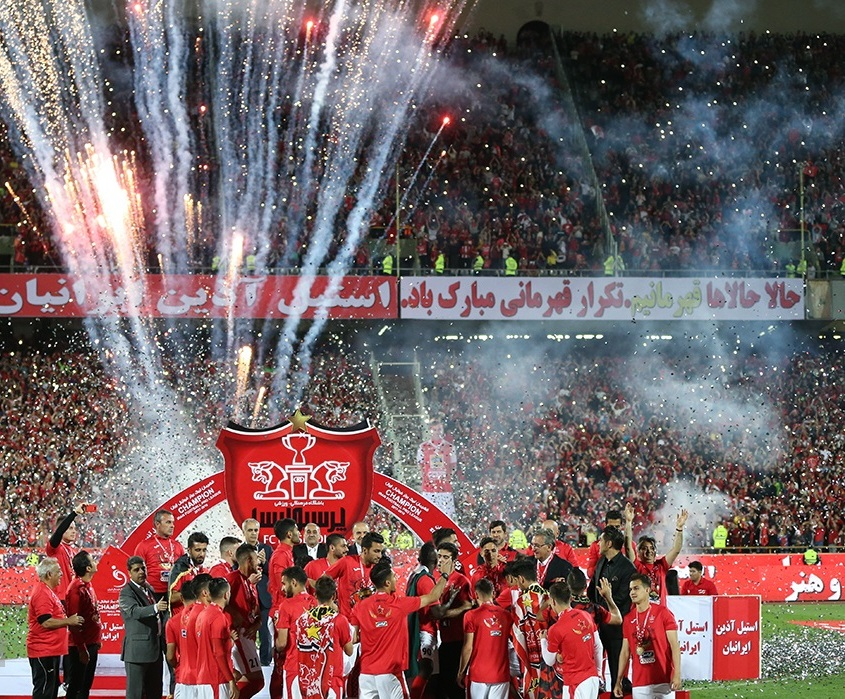
2017–18 Persian Gulf Pro League

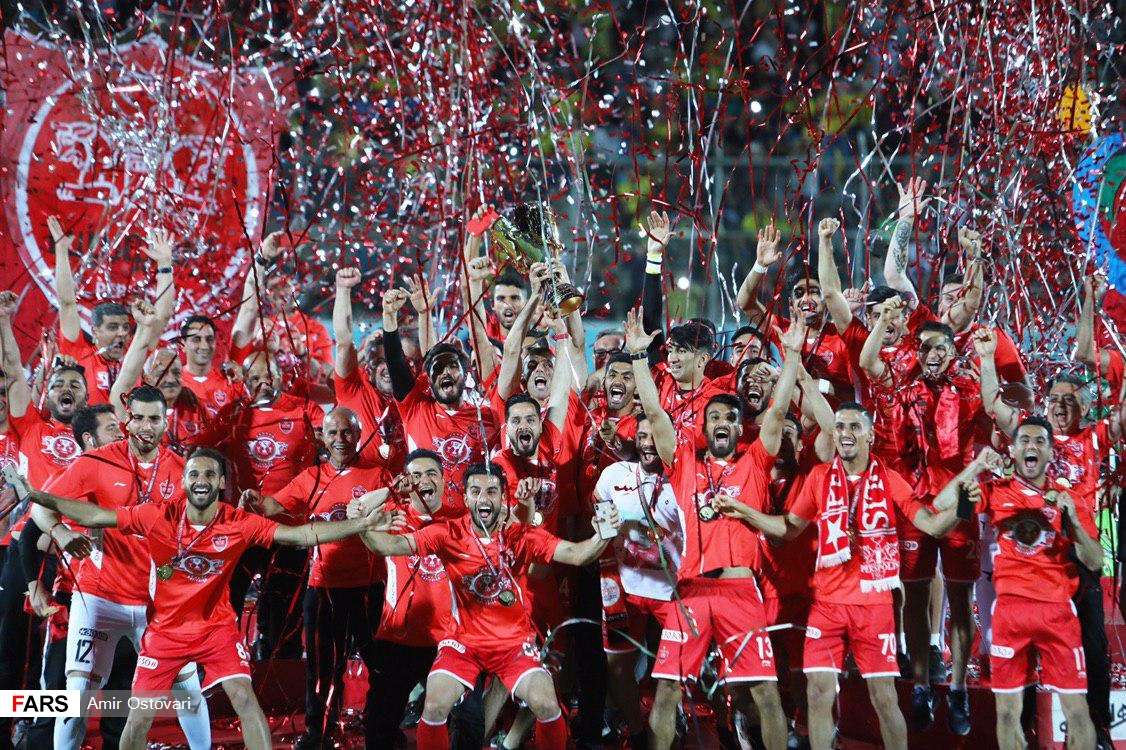
2018–19 Persian Gulf Pro League

=== Golmohammadi years ===
On 13 January 2020, Golmohammadi was named Persepolis F.C. head coach, replacing Argentine Gabriel Calderón. This was Golmohammadi's second stint with Persepolis F.C.. At that moment he took charge of a team who were leading the Persian Gulf Pro League by 3 points. “This is a huge honor.” Golmohammadi said in his first talks as Persepolis new coach.

Reaching the ACL final match for the second time in just three years, Persepolis (now with Golmohammadi) was aiming to end a about 30-year continental trophy drought for the Iranian sides. But lack of sponsorship and financial problems led to the separation of the key players and Persepolis became the Asian runner-up again.

== Home ground ==
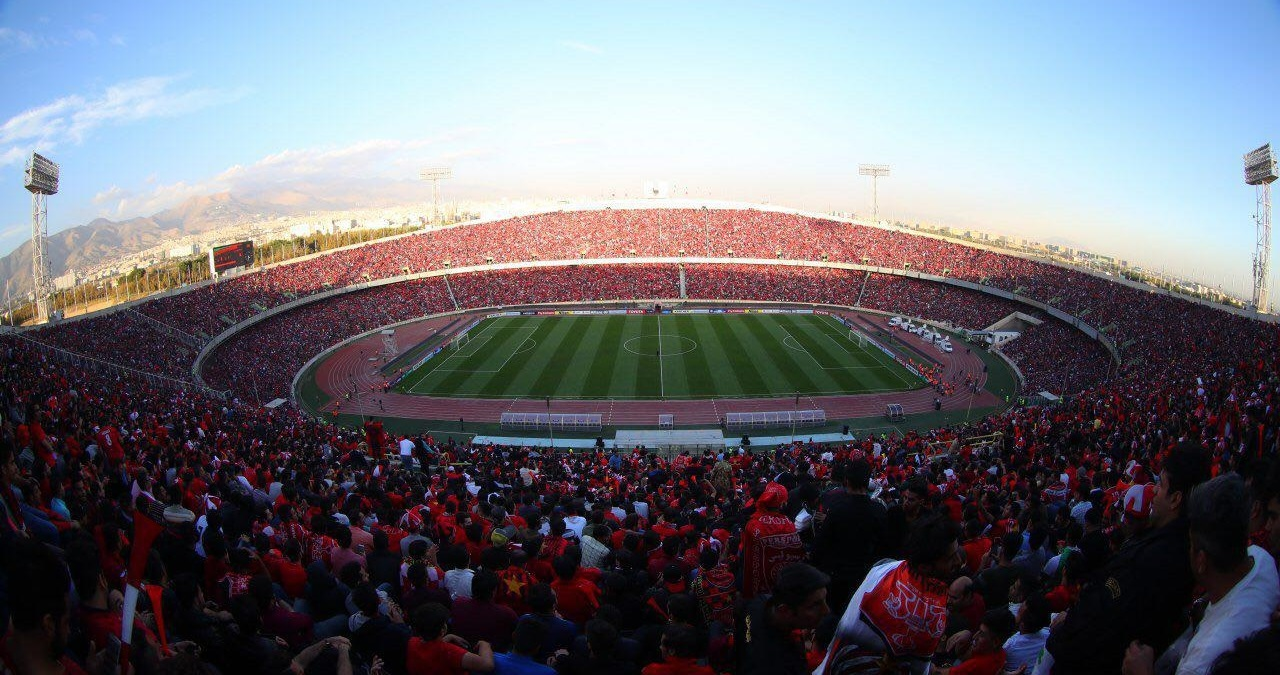
Azadi Stadium on a matchday in 2018

When Persepolis F.C. was created, the sport club already had a number of buildings such as gymnasiums, swimming pools, and bowling alleys in the Bowling Abdo Complex. The facility is in the north of Tehran hosted 1976 Bowling World Cup and renamed Shahid Chamran Bowling after the revolution. There was initially no stadium for the football team. Ali Abdo bought some land in the Ekbatan area of Tehran and constructed a stadium there. At the time it was known as Apadana stadium. Persepolis played only one game at the stadium due to poor organization of the seating and a lack of co-operation with other Iranian clubs. Persepolis only used the stadium as a training ground.

Around the time of mid-1970s, Abdo had to sell much of the club's property to keep the club functioning due to its poor financial situation; he sold Apadana Stadium to Rah Ahan for 200,000 Tomans in 1975. Apadana Stadium is now called Rah Ahan Stadium. Due to the Iranian Islamic Revolution in 1979 club properties were confiscated by the Oppressed and Veterans Foundation (Bonyad Mostazafan, Persian: بنیاد مستضعفان و جانبازان); Bowling Abdo, the club's original headquarters, burnt down, Abdo returned to the United States.

Before the construction of Azadi Stadium in 1971, Persepolis played its matches at Amjadieh (Shahid Shiroudi) Stadium. They have played almost all of their home games at Azadi Stadium, except for the 2002–03 season, when they played all but two of their home matches at Tehran's Takhti Stadium while renovations were taking place at Azadi.

In mid-2006 Persepolis considered buying Shahre Ghods Stadium, but the deal fell through due to Persepolis' poor financial situation and the long distance between the city center and the stadium.
