= Persepolis Athletic and Cultural Club =

Iranian multi-sports club

Coordinates: 35°46′23.95″N 51°23′35.15″E

- Full name: Persepolis Athletic and Cultural Club
- Nicknames: Red army
- Founded: November 1963; 63 years ago
- Based in: Tehran, Iran
- Colors: Red
- President: Peyman Haddadi
- Website: www.fc-perspolis.com

Persepolis Athletic and Cultural Club (Persian:باشگاه فرهنگی ورزشی پرسپولیس) is an Iranian multisport club based in Tehran, Iran. It was established by Ali Abdo. The club is most known for its football team, Persepolis F.C. which competes in the Iran Pro League. It also fields teams in futsal, taekwondo, volleyball, wrestling, handball, swimming, weightlifting, wheelchair basketball, judo, athletics, goalball, and chess. Persepolis Athletic and Cultural Club also owns and operates Persepolis University, Persepolis TV and Radio, Persepolis Energy Drink, and Persepolis Restaurants.

== History ==
=== Shahin F.C. (1942–1967) ===
Shahin F.C. Many of the players shown in this photo went on to play for Persepolis.

Shahin was established in 1942 by Dr. Abbas Ekrami, a teacher. Ekrami founded the club with help of some young students under the motto

اول اخلاق، دوم درس، سوم ورزش
First ethics, second education, third sports.

— Shahin F.C. Motto

Shahin produced many talented players like Parviz Dehdari, Masoud Boroumand, Homayoun Behzadi, Jafar Kashani, Hossein Kalani, Hamid Shirzadegan, and many more that played for Team Melli. These talents made Shahin popular in the 1960s but its very popularity was viewed as a threat by the Iran Football Federation and the Keihan Varzeshi newspaper (Iran's most important sports publication at the time). The conflict between them became worse and on 9 July 1967, two days after Shahin's 3–0 win against Tehranjavan F.C., the Iran Sports Organization declared Shahin F.C. as dissolved. League attendance dropped and other clubs including Pas, Rah Ahan, and Oghab tried to sign Shahin players.

=== Establishment early years (1963–1969) ===
Persepolis squad in the 1960s

Persepolis Athletic and Cultural Club was established in 1963 by Ali Abdo. Abdo had returned to Iran from the United States and was a championship boxer.

Persepolis F.C. started the 1968 season with Parviz Dehdari as manager. Despite the efforts to sign and disperse Shahin players to various clubs, Parviz Dehdari and Masoud Boroumand transferred the popularity of Shahin to Persepolis F.C. by taking most Shahin Players to join Persepolis. The team was initially quite weak, and participated in the 2nd division of the country. The best player on the team then was Mahmoud Khordbin.

The club, using four Shahin players, had a friendly match with Jam Abadan, a respected team at the time. After the match the remainder of the Shahin players joined Persepolis. That year no league competition was held, as many teams had been dissolved, so a 44-team tournament was held, and Persepolis, along with Pas, Taj, and Oghab finished top of the group.

The next year they represented as the first Iranian club in the Asian Champion Club Tournament held in Thailand, but they were not successful and were eliminated in the group stage.

== Chairpersons ==
#	Chairperson	Nat	Tenure	Honours
1	Ali Abdo	(Iran) (United States)	December 1963–January 1975	Iranian Football League; Winner:71–72, 73-74; Runner-up: 74-75
2	Mostafa Makri	(Iran)	January 1975–February 1979	Iranian Football League; Winner:75-76; Runner-up: 76-77, 77-78; Espandi Cup; Winner:1979; Tehran Hazfi Cup; Winner:1979
3	Firouz Aminiyan	(Iran)	April 1979–October 1980	
4	Heydar Boustani	(Iran)	October 1980–September 1981	Tehran Provincial League; Runner-up:1981
–	Akbar Diyani	(Iran)	September 1981–December 1981	
5	Mohammad Reza Rezayian	(Iran)	December 1981–December 1986	Tehran Provincial League; Winner:1982; Tehran Hazfi Cup; Winner:1982; Runner-up:1981, 1983; Tehran Provincial League; Winner:1986
–	Mohammad Ali Deghatpour	(Iran)	December 1986–February 1987	
6	Abbas Vakil	(Iran)	February 1987–June 1988	Hazfi Cup; Winner: 87-88; 17th of Shahrivar league Winner:1988; Tehran Provincial League; Winner: 1987, 1988; Tehran Hazfi Cup; Winner: 1987
–	Mohammad Hossein Eslami	(Iran)	June 1988–April 1989	
–	Kazem Rahimi	(Iran)	April 1989–June 1990	Iranian Football League; Runner-up: 89-90
7	Abbas Ansarifard	(Iran)	June 1990–November 1993	Iranian Football League; Runner-up: 92-93; Hazfi Cup; Winner:90-91; Asian Cup Winners' Cup; Winner: 1991; Runner-up:1993; Tehran Super Cup; Winner: 1992
8	Amir Abedini	(Iran)	November 1993–January 2001	Iranian Football League; Winner: 95-96, 96-97, 98-99, 99-00; Runner-up: 93-94, 2000–01; Hazfi Cup; Winner: 98-99
9	Abbas Ansarifard	(Iran)	January–May 2001	
–	Ali Parvin	(Iran)	May–October 2001*	
10	Ali Mirzaei	(Iran)	October 2001–June 2002	Iranian Football League; Winner:01-02
11	Akbar Ghamkhar	(Iran)	June 2002–June 2004	
–	Hojatollah Khatib	(Iran)	June 2004–December 2005*	
12	Mohammad Hassan Ansarifard	(Iran)	December 2005–June 2007	Hazfi Cup; Runner-up:05-06
13	Habib Kashani	(Iran)	June 2007–June 2008	Iranian Football League; Winner:07-08
14	Dariush Mostafavi	(Iran)	June 2008–January 2009	
15	Abbas Ansarifard	(Iran)	January 2009–October 2009	
–	Habib Kashani	(Iran)	October 2009–September 2011*	Hazfi Cup; Winner:09-10, 10-11
16	Mohammad Rouyanian	(Iran)	September 2011–January 2014	Hazfi Cup; Runner-up:12–13
17	Ali Parvin	(Iran)	January 2014–April 2014	Iranian Football League; Runner-up:13–14
18	Alireza Rahimi	(Iran)	April 2014–September 2014	
–	Behrouz Montaghami	(Iran)	September 2014–November 2014*	
19	Hamid Reza Siasi	(Iran)	November 2014–December 2014	
–	Ali Akbar Taheri	(Iran)	December 2014–February 2015*	
–	Mohammad Hossein Nejad-Fallah	(Iran)	February 2015–June 2015**	
20	Ali Akbar Taheri	(Iran)	June 2015–November 2017	Iranian Football League; Winner: 2016–17; Runner-up:2015–16; Iranian Super Cup; Winner: 2017
21	Hamidreza Garshasbi	(Iran)	November 2017–December 2018	Iranian Football League; Winner: 2017–18; Iranian Super Cup; Winner: 2018; AFC Champions League; Runner-up:2018
22	Iraj Arab	(Iran)	December 2018–August 2019	Iranian Football League; Winner: 2018–19; Hazfi Cup; Winner:2018-19; Iranian Super Cup; Winner: 2019
23	Mohammad Hassan Ansarifard	(Iran)	August 2019–March 2020	
–	Mehdi Rasoul-Panah	(Iran)	March 2020–October 2020*	Iranian Football League; Winner: 2019–20
24	Jafar Samiei	(Iran)	October 2020–September 2021	Iranian Football League; Winner: 2020–21; Iranian Super Cup; Winner: 2020; AFC Champions League; Runner-up: 2020
–	Majid Sadri	(Iran)	September 2021–January 2022*	
25	Reza Darvish	(Iran)	January 2022–October 2025	Iranian Football League; Winner: 2022–23; Hazfi Cup; Winner:2022–23; Iranian Super Cup; Winner: 2023
26	Peyman Haddadi	(Iran)	November 2025–Present	

^{*}as Interim Chairman.

^{**}as Deputy Chairman.

== Ownership ==
Owner	Tenure
(Iran) CRC Company	1963–1979
(Iran) Physical Education Organization	1980–1986
(Iran) Mostazafan Foundation	1986–1989
(Iran) Physical Education Organization	1989–1993
(Iran) Ministry of Industries and Mines	1993–2002
(Iran) Physical Education Organization	2002–2011
(Iran) Ministry of Youth Affairs and Sports	2011–2014
(Iran) Ministry of Economic Affairs and Finance^{*} (Iran) Ministry of Youth Affairs and Sports	2014–2015
(Iran) Ministry of Youth Affairs and Sports	2015–2021
(Iran) Ministry of Economic Affairs and Finance^{*} (Iran) Ministry of Youth Affairs and Sports	2021–2024
Bank Shahr: 30% Bank Mellat: 20% Tejarat Bank: 20% Bank Saderat Iran: 5.175% Refah Bank: 5% EN Bank: 5% MSY: 5.158% Public Shareholders: 9.667%	2024–2025
Bank Shahr: 30% Bank Mellat: 20% Tejarat Bank: 20% Bank Saderat Iran: 5.175% Refah Bank: 5% EN Bank: 5% Shahr Financial Group: 3.715% Public Shareholders: 11.11%	2025–present

- ^{*}Privatization Organization

== University ==
=== Persepolis University ===
It is first Iranian sport university which opened in 2013. Dariuosh Soudi was appointed as the first president of the university and Mehdi Mahdavikia was the first student of this university. This university has 600 students and accepts students in thirteen different fields.

Some fields provided by the university:

- Football Coaching
- Futsal Coaching
- Fitness
- Sport Reporting
- Match Commentary

== Football ==
=== Men's ===
Persepolis Football Club who play in the Iran Pro League. According to the AFC, Persepolis is Asia's number one supported club team. Only Dalian Shide and Al-Hilal have similar support in Asia. Persepolis is the most successful football club in Iran with the record of 15 titles in Iranian domestic football league as well as 7 domestic cup titles. Persepolis has also won an Asian Cup Winners' Cup. The current manager is Yahya Golmohammadi.

== Sponsorship ==
=== Shirt sponsors and manufacturers ===
Persepolis League Sponsors
Period	Kit Manufacturer		Shirt Sponsor			
1994–95	Shekari		Mobliran			
1995–97	Shekari		National Iranian Steel Co.			
1997–98	Nahangi		Iran Insurance Company		LG	Sanam
1998–99	Nahangi		Aiwa			
1999–2000	Jouraban		Aiwa			
2000–01	Jouraban		Samsung			
2001–02	Jouraban		NEC		Tidi	
2002–03	Jouraban		Samsung			
2003–04	Jouraban	Daei	Pars Television			
2004–05	Nahangi		Perspower		Jaguar Drink	
2005–06	Nahangi		Bomba	Dariush Hotel	Shahr Aftab	Giordano
2006–07	Hessari		Irtoya	Ecut	Irancell	
2007–08	Uhlsport		City Credit Cooperative			Shahrvand
2008–09	Uhlsport		None	Marrybrown		
2009–10^{§}	Uhlsport		Behgol		Tehran Municipality	
2010–11	Uhlsport		City Bank			
2011–12	Uhlsport		City Bank	Opel		Persepolis Card
2012–13	Uhlsport		Sadra System Pasargad			
2013–14	Uhlsport		Tourism Bank			
2014–15	Macron		EJS Co.	None		EJS Co.
2015–16	Uhlsport		T.T Bank	None	Hamrahe Aval	
2016–17^{¤}	Joma		Hamrahe Aval			
2017–18	Joma		Irancell			
2018–19	Li-Ning		Irancell			
2019–20	Uhlsport		Irancell		Tourism Bank	
2020–21	Uhlsport		Tourism Bank			
2021–22	Uhlsport		Tourism Bank		Irancell	
2022–23	Uhlsport		Irancell			
2023–24	Merooj		Irancell			
2024–25	Merooj		Saba Battery			
2025–26	Merooj		Tabiat	Bank Shahr	DARIA	
2026–27	Yousef Jameh		Red Bank	DARIA		

^{§} in 2009–10 Persepolis wear Hessari in first three matches.
^{¤} in 2016–17 Persepolis wear Givova in first ten matches.

== Futsal ==
=== Men's ===
Persepolis Futsal Club is a futsal team that play's in the Iran Futsal's 1st Division, the second-tier league in Iran. The team formerly played in the Super League, but after it ceased operations for a year, it was given a placement in the 2013–14 1st Division season. In 2014 Persepolis Futsal Club was again promoted to the Iranian Futsal Super League.

=== Women's ===
Persepolis WFSC is a women's futsal team the plays in the Iranian Women's Super League.

== Weightlifting ==
On 16 August 2012, under the approval of chairman Mohammad Rouyanian the Persepolis Weightlifting Team was established. Behdad Salimi the gold medallist at the 2012 Olympics became the team's first signing.

== Taekwondo ==
Persepolis' taekwondo team was founded recently, they have won one Iranian domestic championship.

== Swimming ==
The Persepolis Swimming Team was founded after the Iranian Revolution in 1979. The team has won the national competition once in its history.

== Track and Field ==
The Persepolis Track and Field team was founded in August 2012 with the permission of chairman Mohammad Rouyanian. Olympic bronze medallist Ehsan Hadadi became the team's first ever signing.

== Bowling ==
With the name of Abdo Bowling Club, it was one of Persepolis' first teams and was created by founder Ali Abdo. After the Iranian Revolution the team was dissolved.

== Volleyball ==
Persepolis VC is one of the oldest volleyball teams in Iran, it has currently ceased operations due to lack of funds.
