= Abbas Ansarifard =

Iranian football administrator (1956–2021)

Abbas Ansarifard (Persian: عباس انصاری فرد; 25 April 1956 – 8 September 2021) was an Iranian football administrator who was chairman of multisport club Persepolis Athletic and Cultural Club between 1990 and 1993, January 2001–October 2001 and again briefly 2009. He was brother of Mohammad Hassan Ansarifard, a former player and chairman of Persepolis.

He died of COVID-19 on 8 September 2021.

Business positions
Preceded by Javad Tabatabaei	Persepolis chairman 1990-1993	Succeeded by Amir Abedini
Preceded by Amir Abedini	Persepolis chairman 2001	Succeeded by Ali Parvin
Preceded by Dariush Mostafavi	Persepolis chairman 2009	Succeeded by Habib Kashani
