= Ali Mirzaei =

Ali Mirzaei (Persian: علی میرزایی) may refer to

- Ali Mirzaei (footballer) (born 1942), Iranian football player
- Ali Mirzaei (politician) (born 1949), Iranian politician, journalist and football administrator
- Ali Mirzaei (weightlifter) (1929–2020), Iranian weightlifter
