= Persepolis TV =

Perspolis TV
- Country: Iran
- Headquarters: Kazemi Stadium

Ownership
- Owner: Persepolis Athletic and Cultural Club

History
- Launched: 30 May 2013 (original); 2017

Availability

Streaming media
- YouTube: Persepolis TV(شبکه پرسپولیس)

Persepolis TV was an encrypted free-to-air channel, operated by Persepolis F.C. specialising in the Iranian football team. The channel was available in Persian.

The channel was closed in 2013, however it re-opened in 2017 under the name Persepolis TV.
