= Hossein Mahlouji =

Iranian politician

Minister of Mines and Metals
- In office 29 August 1989 – 20 August 1997
- President: Akbar Hashemi Rafsanjani
- Preceded by: Mohammad-Reza Ayatollahi
- Succeeded by: Eshaq Jahangiri

Member of the Parliament of Iran
- In office 1982–1989
- Constituency: Isfahan, Kashan
- Majority: 59,446 (55.42%)

Governor of Lorestan Province
- In office 19 July 1980 – 8 December 1981
- President: Mohammad-Ali Rajai; Ali Khamenei
- Prime Minister: Mohammad-Javad Bahonar; Mohammad-Reza Mahdavi Kani; Mir-Hossein Mousavi
- Preceded by: Hossein Aali
- Succeeded by: Amir Abedini

Personal details
- Born: Mohammd-Hossein Mahloujchi; 1947 (age 78–79) Kashan, Iran
- Party: Moderation and Development Party
- Other political affiliations: Islamic Republican Party
- Profession: Mechanical engineer

Mohammad-Hossein Mahloujchi (Persian: محمدحسین محلوج‌چی, also known as Hossein Mahlouji) is an Iranian politician. He served as the minister of mines and metals under president Akbar Hashemi Rafsanjani and a member of parliament for three terms during 1980s.
