= Ali Mirzaei (politician) =

Iranian politician, journalist and football administrator

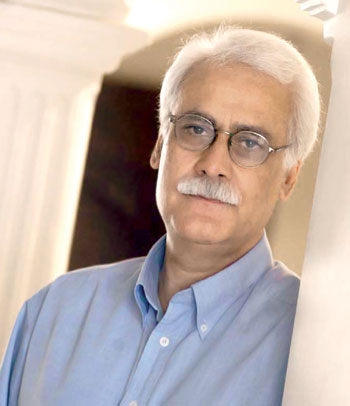

Chairman of Persepolis FC
- In office 15 October 2001 – 16 June 2002
- Preceded by: Ali Parvin
- Succeeded by: Akbar Ghamkhar

Deputy Minister of Finance
- In office 1 March 1997 – 1 March 2001
- President: Mohammad Khatami
- Preceded by: Ali Zibande
- Succeeded by: Kamran Sepehri

Personal details
- Born: October 1, 1949 (age 76) Tehran, Iran

Ali Mirzaei (Persian: علی میرزایی, born 1 October 1949 in Tehran, Iran) is an Iranian politician, journalist and football administrator. He served as the director of the libraries in Institute for Intellectual Development of Children and Young Adults, Plan and Budget Organization, National Iranian Steel Company, Research and Training Institute for Management and Development Planning, Ministry of Economic Affairs and Finance in which he was the deputy of Minister during the second term of President Khatami. Ali Mirzaei is more well known for being chairman of the famous multisport club Persepolis Athletic and Cultural Club based in Tehran, Iran between October 2001 and June 2002.

== Chairmanship ==
Ali Mirzaei has been the consultant, CEO, CEO, and Managing Director of Persepolis Athletic and Cultural Club. Mirzaei was the first deputy of the Iran Ministry of Economy and Financial Affairs after taking the chairmanship of Persepolis Athletic and Cultural Club. He resigned from the Ministry of Economy and Financial Affairs after Tahmasb Mazaheri resigned from his post as the Minister of the mentioned Ministry. He was a member of the Board of Steel Azin from 2010 to 2011.

== Journalism ==
Mirzaei has been director and Editor-in-Chief of the following journals:

- Barnameh- va- Tose,e (Planning & Development)
- Daneshmand (The Scientist)
- Hamahang
- Faraaz
- Persepolis
- Negah-e-Nou (New Look)

Business positions
| Preceded by Ali Parvin | Persepolis chairman 2001–2002 | Succeeded by Akbar Ghamkhar |
