= Kazem Rahimi =

Iranian footballer

Personal information
- Full name: Hossein Kalani
- Date of birth: October 23, 1942 (age 84)
- Place of birth: Tehran, Iran
- Position: Midfielder

Senior career*
Years	Team	Apps	(Gls)
1963–1968	Shahin		
1968–1969	Persepolis		
1969–1970	Gard		
1970	→ Paykan (loan)		
1970–1972	Homa		
1972–1973	Persepolis		
- * Club domestic league appearances and goals

Kazem Rahimi (born 23 October 1942) is a retired Iranian football striker.

Rahimi was born in Tehran and has played for Shahin, Persepolis, Paykan Tehran, and Homa.
