= Mohammad Hassan Ansarifard =

Iranian footballer

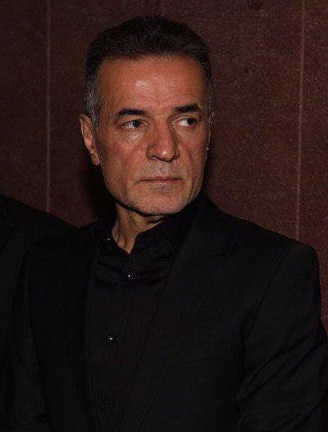

Personal information
- Full name: Mohammad Hassan Ansarifard
- Date of birth: 9 September 1962 (age 64)
- Place of birth: Tehran, Iran
- Position: Midfielder

Senior career*
| Years | Team | Apps | (Gls) |
| 1973–1975 | Shahin | | |
| 1975–1979 | Homa | | |
| 1979–1984 | Keshavarz | | |
| 1984–1992 | Persepolis | | |
| 1992–1994 | Keshavarz | | |

International career
| 1985–1992 | Iran | 14 | (3) |
| 1992 | Iran futsal | | |
- * Club domestic league appearances and goals

Mohammad Hassan Ansarifard (Persian: محمدحسن انصاری‌فرد; born 9 September 1962) is an Iranian former footballer who played for Persepolis and the Iranian national team. He is currently the president of Persepolis F.C. since 27 August 2019. He was also president of Persepolis F.C. from 2005 until 2007, and also managing director of Rah Ahan F.C. from 2007 to 2012. He is the younger brother of Abbas Ansarifard.

== Playing career ==
He started his football career before the Iranian revolution, playing with Homayoun F.C.. After the revolution he played for Shahin F.C. and Takavar F.C.. In 1985, he moved to Persepolis F.C. and stayed there until 1992. He was a member of the Iranian national team during the same time.

== Honours ==
=== Club ===
Persepolis

- Hazfi Cup (2): 1987–88, 1991–92
- Tehran Province League (4): 1987–88, 1988–89, 1989–90, 1990–91
- Asian Cup Winners' Cup (1): 1990–91

=== National ===
Iran

- Asian Games Gold Medal (1): 1990

== Coaching career ==
He began his coaching career in Fath F.C., soon moving to Payanehaye Isfahan. He also had a brief coaching stint in Mashhad, coaching Partsazan. He then was asked to coach the Iranian national futsal team. He was very successful there, winning numerous Asian Championships and helping the team qualify for the World Cup of Futsal. He left the team after three years, and became head coach of Persepolis' futsal club. His time there was short, and he moved to Iran Khodro futsal club, helping them win the national league.

== Administrative career ==
=== IRIFF ===
Ansarifard was a transitory board member of the Islamic Republic of Iran Football Federation from 17 December 2006, to 8 May 2010.

=== Persepolis ===
On 5 December 2005, by three votes to two, he was chosen to be Persepolis' chairman after the resignation of Hojatollah Khatib. In April 2007, Ansarifard resigned from his post because of pressure from political board members.

In late April 2007 Ansarifard submitted his resignation to Ali Saeedlu in protest at the intervention of Physical Education on appointing several new managers into the club management committee. It was reported that Persepolis management has accepted Ansarifard's resignation, however this was not the case, and Ansarifard remained as chairman of Persepolis until the end of the 2006/07 season.

=== Rah Ahan ===
Ansarifard became chairman of IPL side Rah Ahan F.C. on 1 August 2007. He resigned effective on 12 July 2012.

== Notes ==
Business positions
| Preceded by Hojatollah Khatib | Persepolis chairman 2005–2007 | Succeeded by Habib Kashani |
| Preceded by Iraj Arab | Persepolis chairman 2019–2020 | Succeeded by Jafar Samiei |
