= Habib Kashani =

Iranian politician and businessman

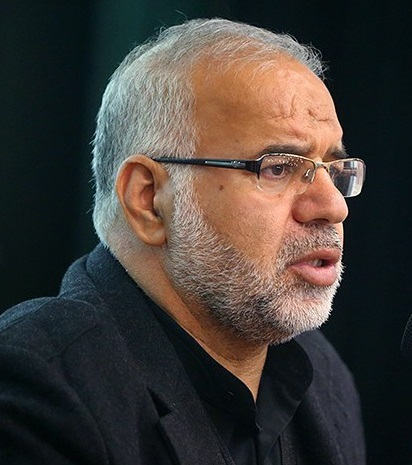

Member of City Council of Tehran
- Incumbent
- Assumed office 4 August 2021
- In office 29 April 2003 – 22 August 2017

Personal details
- Born: March 6, 1955 (age 71) Tehran, Iran
- Party: Alliance of Builders of Islamic Iran
- Education: Isfahan University

Habib Kashani (Persian: حبيب کاشانی) is an Iranian politician and businessman. He is a member of City Council of Tehran since 2021. He was the chairman of famous multisport club Persepolis Athletic and Cultural Club based in Tehran, Iran, between 1 June 2007 to 1 June 2008 and for a second term from 1 October 2009 to 20 September 2011. He is also a member of the AFC Committee for Professional Clubs and business manager of Iran national under-23 football team.

== Early life ==
He was born on 6 March 1955 in Tehran, Iran. He begin teaching in Tehran schools after receiving his B.C. from Isfahan University. He participated in the Iran–Iraq War from 1981 to 1985. When he returned to Tehran, he continue his teaching career. He was a sports teacher.

== Sports career ==
He became chairman of the club on 1 June 2007. He contracted with Afshin Ghotbi in the 2007–08 Persian Gulf Cup and with Ghotbi became champion of that year's league. He resigned from his post one year later and continued his career in City Council. When Abbas Ansarifard resigned his position in September 2009, Kashani was re-selected as chairman of the club and in December 2009, he was contracted with Ali Daei but was unsuccessful in the league. They won the 2009–10 Hazfi Cup. Kashani has been a board member of the Football Federation of Iran since August 3, 2010. After triumphing another Hazfi Cup with Ali Daei in next season, Daei left the club due to conflicts between Kashani and him, which were unfolded in a highly disputed debate at Navad. He signed a contract with the choice of "Technical Committee", Hamid Estili as new head coach of Persepolis on 21 June 2011.

Some fans believed that the Technical Committee was a show from Kashani to pull over Daei, and select his "beloved friend" Estili. In the opening match of the season against Malavan, which ended 1–1 after the weak performance of Persepolis and late tying goal by Hossein Badamaki, fans started screaming the name of Ali Daei since 60th minute, showing their displeasure. protests continued in next matches by booing Estili and Kashani, and slogans wanting them to leave the club. In a poll by Navad on August 15, 2011, 51% believed that the way Estili was chosen is the main reason of protests. Other reasons included weak performance by players (36%) and impatient fans (13%). Kashani resigned as chairman of Persepolis on 20 September 2011.

=== Signings ===
| Rank | Player | From | Year |
|---|---|---|---|
| 1. | (Iran) Mohsen Khalili | (Iran) Saipa | 2007 |
| 2. | (Iran) Mohammad Nosrati | (Iran) Pas Tehran | 2007 |
| 3. | (Iran) Hossein Kaebi | (United Arab Emirates) Emirates | 2007 |
| 5. | (Iran) Rahman Ahmadi | (Iran) Sepahan | 2010 |
| 6. | (Iran) Alireza Noormohammadi | (Iran) Rah Ahan | 2010 |
| 7. | (Iran) Maziar Zare | (United Arab Emirates) Al-Sharjah | 2010 |
| 8. | (Iran) Mohammad Nouri | (Iran) Saba | 2010 |
| 9. | (Iran) Amir Hossein Feshangchi | (Iran) Saba | 2010 |
| 10. | (Iran) Gholamreza Rezaei | (Iran) Foolad | 2010 |
| 11. | (Burkina Faso) Hervé Oussalé | (Belgium) RAEC Mons | 2010 |
| 12. | (Mali) Sékou Berthé | (England) Plymouth Argyle | 2010 |
| 13. | (Iran) Vahid Hashemian | (Germany) VfL Bochum | 2010 |
| 14. | (Iran) Ali Karimi | (Germany) Schalke 04 | 2011 |
| 15. | (Iran) Mohammad Nosrati | (Iran) Tractor Sazi | 2011 |
| 16. | (Iran) Misagh Memarzadeh | (Iran) Foolad | 2011 |
| 17. | (Iran) Mehrdad Oladi | (Iran) Malavan | 2011 |
| 18. | (Iran) Reza Hamzepour | (Iran) Youth System | 2011 |
| 19. | (Burkina Faso) Mamadou Tall | (Portugal) União Leiria | 2011 |
| 20. | (Iran) Javad Kazemian | (Iran) Sepahan | 2011 |

== Political career ==
He was elected as Member of City Council of Tehran in local election of 2003 and assumed office on 10 April 2003. He is a supporter of Mahmoud Ahmadinejad. Then, he was re-elected in 2006 and 2013 and currently is the longest-serving member of the council along with Mehdi Chamran.

Business positions
| Preceded by Mohammad Hassan Ansarifard | Persepolis chairman 2007–2008 | Succeeded by Dariush Mostafavi |
| Preceded by Abbas Ansarifard | Persepolis chairman 2009–2011 | Succeeded by Mohammad Rouyanian |
