= Ali Abdo (football chairman) =

Founder of Persepolis Athletic and Cultural Club

Ali Abdoh
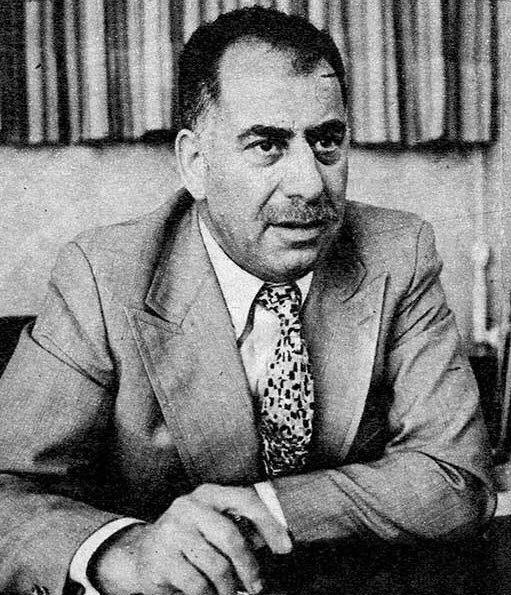
- Born: June 2, 1928; Borujerd, Imperial State of Iran
- Died: January 29, 1980 (aged 51); Los Angeles, United States
- Citizenship: United States
- Occupations: Founder, Chairman and CEO of CRC Company. Owner of Persepolis Athletic and Cultural Club
- Spouse: Homa Mohajerin
- Children: 4: Salar Abdoh (son); Reza Abdoh (son); Sardar Abdoh (son); Negar Abdoh (daughter)
- Parent: Mohammad Abdoh Boroujerdi (father)
- Relatives: Jalal Abdoh (brother); Mehdi Abdoh (brother); Hossein Abdoh (brother)

Ali Abdoh (Persian: علی عبده) was an Iranian boxer and founder of Persepolis F.C., one of the major teams in Iran. He was Chairman of Persepolis F.C. from 1963 to 1975.

== Early life ==
He was born in 1928 in Iran. His father was Mohammad Abdoh Boroujerdi, a chief justice and expert in Islamic law in the Reza Shah era. His brother was Jalal Abdoh who was Iran's Ambassador to India and Italy and to the United Nations. Jalal Abdoh was also one of the members of the team that argued Iran's case against the British at the Hague for nationalization of its oil during the Mosaddegh era.

== Career ==
Abdo returned to Iran from the United States and was a championship boxer. He founded Persepolis Sports Club in 1963, which is also made up of a basketball team, volleyball team and most importantly the famous football team, Persepolis F.C.

Persepolis F.C. today is an Iranian football club.

Bowling Abdoh, the club's original headquarters still exists today on Shariati Avenue as the Shahid Chamran Sports and Cultural Complex.

Business positions
New title	Persepolis chairman 1963–1975	Succeeded by Mostafa Mokri
