= Dariush Mostafavi =

Iranian footballer (1944–2025)

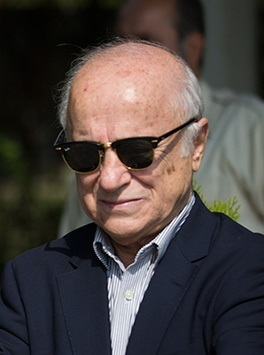
- Mostafavi in 2018

Personal information
- Full name: Seyed Dariush Mostafavi
- Date of birth: 8 September 1944
- Place of birth: Tehran, Iran
- Date of death: 1 August 2025 (aged 80)
- Position: Striker

Senior career*
Years	Team	Apps	(Gls)
- Tehranjavan
- Taj
- Persepolis

International career
1964–1971	Iran	5	(0)
- * Club domestic league appearances and goals

Seyed Dariush Mostafavi (Persian: سید داریوش مصطفوی, 8 September 1944 – 1 August 2025) was an Iranian football player and executive. He was the chairman of the multisport club Persepolis F.C. based in Tehran, and chairman of IRIFF. Mostafavi was also a player for Team Melli, Taj and Persepolis. He died on 1 August 2025, at the age of 80.

== Sources ==
- Dariush Mostafavi at National-Football-Teams.com
- Evans, Hilary; Gjerde, Arild; Heijmans, Jeroen; Mallon, Bill; et al. "Dariush Mostafavi". Olympics at Sports-Reference.com. Sports Reference LLC. Archived from the original on 18 April 2020.

Business positions
Preceded by Habib Kashani	Persepolis chairman 2008–2009	Succeeded by Abbas Ansarifard
Preceded by Amir Abedini	IRIFF president 1994–1997	Succeeded by Mohsen Safaei Farahani
