= Amir Abedini =

Iranian football chairman and politician (born 1949)

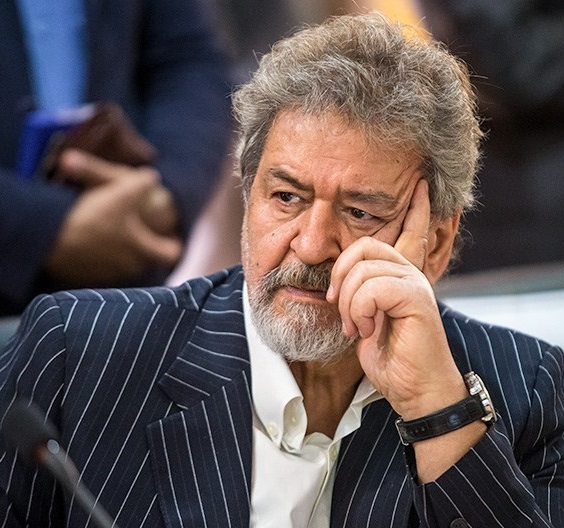

Member of the City Council of Tehran
- In office 28 September 1999 – 15 January 2003
- Majority: 176,289 (12.56%)

President of Football Federation Islamic Republic of Iran
- In office 21 April 1994 – 24 October 1994
- Preceded by: Mohammad Safi Zadeh
- Succeeded by: Dariush Mostafavi

Governor of Khorasan province
- In office 1987–1989
- President: Ali Khamenei
- Prime Minister: Mir-Hossein Mousavi
- Preceded by: Abdollah Koupayi
- Succeeded by: Ali Jannati

Governor of East Azerbaijan province
- In office 9 January 1984 – 12 May 1987
- President: Ali Khamenei
- Prime Minister: Mir-Hossein Mousavi
- Preceded by: Hossein Taheri
- Succeeded by: Akbar Parhizkar

Governor of Lorestan province
- In office 8 December 1981 – 29 January 1984
- President: Ali Khamenei
- Prime Minister: Mir-Hossein Mousavi
- Preceded by: Hossein Mahlouji
- Succeeded by: Ahmad Entezari

Personal details
- Born: Hassan Abedini; 13 December 1949 (age 76) Tehran, Iran

Amir Abedini (Persian: امیر عابدینی; born Hassan Abedini on 13 December 1949) is an Iranian politician, football club chairman, former professional footballer and member of the City Council of Tehran.

== Political career ==
During 1980s, he held office as governor of three provinces under Government of Mir-Hossein Mousavi (1981–89). Abedini is a self-described "Mousavi[-like] left-winger" politician. In 1997, he endorsed Ali Akbar Nategh-Nouri for president.

== Sport career ==
Abedini played for Persepolis and Paykan in the 1960s.

He was the chairman of the Persepolis Athletic and Cultural Club from 1993 to 2000. Also he was chairman of the club Damash Iranian and Damash Gilan.
