= Persepolis F.C. =

Iranian football club in Tehran

Coordinates: 35°46′23.95″N 51°23′35.15″E

Persepolis
- Full name: Persepolis Football Club
- Nicknames: The Red Army; Tehran Reds
- Short name: PRS
- Founded: November 1963; 63 years ago as Persepolis Amateur (Bowling) team 21 March 1967; 59 years ago as Persepolis Football team
- Ground: Azadi Stadium
- Capacity: 78,116
- Owner(s): Persepolis Athletic and Cultural Club (Bank Shahr: 30% Bank Mellat: 20% Tejarat Bank: 20% Bank Saderat Iran: 5.175% Refah Bank: 5% EN Bank: 5% Shahr Financial Group: 3.715% Public Shareholders: 11.11% – IFB: PSPP1)
- President: Peyman Haddadi
- Head coach: Mehdi Tartar
- League: Persian Gulf Pro League
- 2025–26: Persian Gulf Pro League, 5th of 16
- Website: fc-perspolis.com
Home colours	Away colours

Persepolis Football Club (Persian: باشگاه فوتبال پرسپولیس, romanized: Bâšgâh-e Futbâl-e Perspolis) is an Iranian professional football club based in Tehran that competes in the Persian Gulf Pro League. Persepolis F.C. is the football club of the multisport Persepolis Athletic and Cultural Club. The club was owned by the Ministry of Youth Affairs and Sports until April 2024 when, due to Asian Football Confederation licensing regulations, an 85% majority ownership stake was transferred to a consortium of six Iranian banks. Ten percent of the club's shares are publicly available on the Tehran Stock Exchange.

Persepolis was founded in 1963 by Ali Abdo and has been in the first division of Iranian football since 1968. The club has played at its home ground, Azadi Stadium, since 1973. They contest the Tehran Derby against rival team Esteghlal, a match that is closely followed by Iranian football fans and considered to be one of the biggest in Asia. According to the Asian Football Confederation, Persepolis is one of the most popular football clubs in Asia. At the AFC Champions League, 11 of the top 20 matches by attendance were played by Persepolis. Persepolis has also broken the record of 100,000 attendees in four matches at the AFC Champions League. Persepolis has won a record 16 Iranian league titles, as well as seven Hazfi Cups, five Super Cups and the 1990–91 Asian Cup Winners' Cup. Many notable players have played for the club, including former Bundesliga players Ali Karimi, Ali Daei, Vahid Hashemian and Mehdi Mahdavikia. Ali Parvin, who spent 18 years with the club from 1970 to 1988, is widely regarded as the club's greatest player.

== History ==
=== Shahin F.C. (1942–1967) ===
Shahin F.C. in the 1960s, including many players who went on to play for Persepolis

Shahin was established in 1942 by Dr. Abbas Ekrami, a teacher. Ekrami founded the club with the help of his young students and adopted the motto: "اول اخلاق، دوم درس، سوم ورزش" (transl. "Ethics first, education second, sports third").

Shahin produced many talented players, including Parviz Dehdari, Masoud Boroumand, Homayoun Behzadi, Jafar Kashani, Hossein Kalani and Hamid Shirzadegan, as well as players who played for the Iran national football team. Shahin was popular in the 1960s, but the Football Federation Islamic Republic of Iran (FFIRI) and Keihan Varzeshi (Iran's most important sports publication at the time) viewed that popularity as a threat. The conflict between FFIRI and the team grew to a head on 9 July 1967—two days after Shahin's 3–0 win against Tehranjavan F.C.—when the FFIRI dissolved the clubm. League attendance dropped and other clubs, including Pas, Rah Ahan and Oghab, attempted to sign Shahin players.

=== Establishment early years (1963–1969) ===
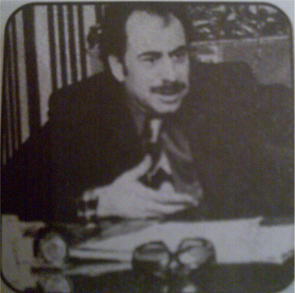
Ali Abdo, founder and first chairman of the club

Persepolis in the 1960s

Persepolis Athletic and Cultural Club was established in 1963 by Ali Abdo. Abdo had returned to Iran from the United States and was a championship boxer.

Persepolis F.C. started the 1968 season with Dehdari as manager. Under Dehdari, the club signed many of Shahin's former players, thereby retaining its popularity. The team was initially quite weak, and participated in Iran's second division. The best player on the team then was Mahmoud Khordbin.

The club, using four Shahin players, had a friendly match with Jam Abadan, a respected team at the time. After the match, the remainder of the Shahin players joined Persepolis. That year, no league competition was held, as many teams had been dissolved, so a 44-team tournament was held. Persepolis, along with Pas, Taj and Oghab, finished top of the group.

The next year Persepolis was the first Iranian club to compete at the Asian Champion Club Tournament held in Thailand, where they were eliminated in the group stage.

=== Takht Jamshid Cup (1969–1979) ===
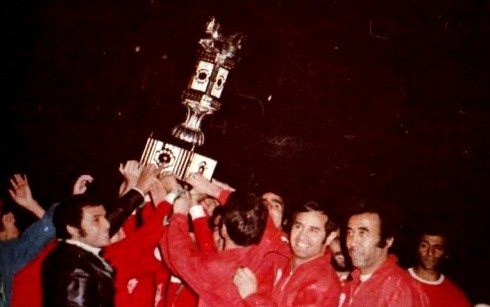
Persepolis winning the Takht Jamshid Cup in 1973

In 1969, Mahmoud Khayami, one of the founders of automobile company Iran National, negotiated with Persepolis and signed all former Shahin players, except for Aziz Asli and Mahmoud Khordbin, to his new team, Paykan Tehran F.C. Paykan won the championship that year, but the new players moved back to Persepolis at the end of the season.

In 1971, Persepolis won its first ever championship in the Iranian League; Persepolis had ended the season with 13 wins and 1 draw in 14 weeks. In 1972, Abdo announced Persepolis as the first professional football club in Iran. The club did not enter the domestic league and only played against foreign clubs; a few months later, it became amateur again. In 1973, the Takht Jamshid Cup was established. Persepolis won the inaugural Cup and again in 1975. That year, Persepolis lost just two matches of thirty matches. Persepolis is the most successful club in the Takht Jamshid Cup league, clinching two championship titles and finishing three times as runner-up.

=== Success under tough conditions (1979–1990) ===
Persepolis players Safar Iranpak, Homayoun Behzadi and Hossein Kalani at the Takht Jamshid Cup

With the Iranian Revolution in 1979, Abdo returned to United States. Although Persepolis won the Espandi Cup, the club fell apart and many of its old players did not return. The club's property was sequestered by the government-run Oppressed and Veterans Foundation (Persian: بنیاد مستضعفان و جانبازان) and the club was placed under the management of the Physical Education Organization (Persian: سازمان تربیت بدنی).

In 1981, the Physical Education Organization declared that the name of the club would change, but club officials, players and fans opposed the move. In protest, the team did not appear in a match against Homa in the Tehran league, losing 3–0 by default and handing Homa the championship. In 1986, the club was taken over by the Oppressed and Veterans Foundation and renamed Azadi (transl. freedom; Persian: آزادی). Players declared that they would not play for the club if the name change went through. After a brief period, the Foundation handed control back to the Physical Education Organization. On 16 February 1987, the Physical Education Organization renamed the club Pirouzi (transl. victory; Persian: پیروزی) with the players' agreement; fans still called the name Persepolis, however. On 10 April 2012, club chairman Mohammad Rouyanian announced that the club's official name was Persepolis.

In the 1980s, the club only played in the Tehran League and various elimination tournaments. Persepolis was successful and maintained its popularity, winning the Tehran League five seasons in a row. During that time, Ali Parvin served as player-manager.

=== Revitalization (1990–2001) ===
The 1990s were a successful decade for the team, with four league championships, two Hazfi Cups, a strong roster and renewed support. At one point, more than six Persepolis players were starters on Iran's national team. The team won the national championship in the 1995–96 season, coming back from being 10 points behind Bahman to be 6 points ahead of the league runner-up. They won the league again the next season, again finishing ahead of the runner up by 6 points. In the same year they were stopped by the Korean Pohang Steelers in the semi-finals of the Asian Champions' Cup.Persepolis finished third, defeating Iraq's Al-Zawraa in the third place match in 1996–97 ACC.

The team withdrew from National League in the following season because a large number of players were on the national team and the club had commitment to play in the Asian Champions' Cup. The poor scheduling and mismanagement of both the FFIRI and AFC officials led to this unprofessional event. This prevented Persepolis from possibly winning a third consecutive league championship. Persepolis did not have much luck in the Asian Champion's cup either, as they were once again stopped in the semi-finals, this time by Chinese club, Dalian Wanda; they lost the third place match to Al-Hilal.

The 1996–97 and 1997–98 Persepolis teams are considered by many to be among the greatest Iranian clubs to ever play. National team players and future superstars, such as Ahmadreza Abedzadeh, Khodadad Azizi, Karim Bagheri, Ali Daei, Mehdi Mahdavikia, Mehrdad Minavand and Ali Karimi played for the club during those seasons.

After the World Cup 1998, several of Persepolis' best players were transferred to European clubs, but Persepolis maintained a talented squad, with future national team members Ali Karimi and Hamed Kavianpour joining the club. They won the 1998–99 championship as well as the Hazfi Cup that season. They also won the 1999–2000 league championship, again finishing third in the Asian Champions Cup. This would be their last championship in the Azadegan League era. Most of Persepolis' championships at the time were won while Ali Parvin was the manager and Amirali Abedini was the chairman.

=== IPL era (2001–present) ===
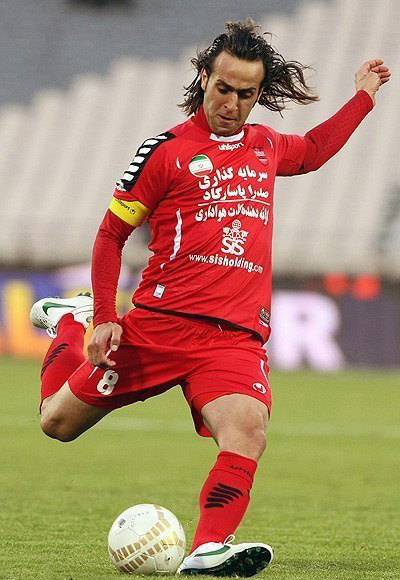
Ali Karimi played for the team on three occasions from 1998 to 2013.

Persepolis joined the Iran Pro League (IPL) when it was formed in 2001. By the end of the inaugural season, they were in a close race with their rival Esteghlal, which led the league by two points going into the final day of the regular season. Esteghlal's loss to Malavan and Persepolis' 1–0 win against Fajr Sepasi in their last games of the season gave Persepolis a one-point lead and the first-ever IPL championship. Persepolis finished third in the 2002–03 season; they also failed to advance out of the group stage in the newly created AFC Champions League.

When Akbar Ghamkhar took over as club chairman, he made several changes in an effort to improve the team. He made player and staff salaries public, angering Parvin, the highest paid player on the team. Ghamkhar hired coach Vinko Begović and entered into contracts with several prominent players. Persepolis had a good start in the 2003–04 season, but things deteriorated. Begović left the team and German manager Rainer Zobel was bought in. Ghamkhar was also replaced with Hojatollah Khatib, who brought back Parvin as the club's technical director. The club finished fifth in the standings in the 2004–05 season.

The club experienced major financial problems as some of the spending decisions made in previous years had overextended the club. Persepolis finished the 2005–06 season in ninth place, the lowest it had ever placed. Parvin left the club in February 2006, vowing to never return to Persepolis following a 4–2 loss to Fajr Sepasi in Azadi Stadium; after the game, fans had cursed at Parvin and the players.

Khatib resigned as chairman and Mohammad Hassan Ansarifard was elected to the post by the club council. Arie Haan was brought in as the new manager, helping the team make it to the 2005–06 Hazfi Cup final, but he was fired by the club just before the 2006–07 season began. Turkish manager Mustafa Denizli signed with the team on 17 August 2006. Denizili's first match was the final cup matchWith the final cup match being his first one as the club's manager, Denizli was not able to help the club win the Hazfi Cup in 2006, a cup that the team needed to gain entry into the Asian Champion's League and to receive financial benefits by doing so.

The club did not win the Hazfi Cup in 2007, losing to Sepahan in the semi-finals. The club finished third in the 2006–07 IPL, and Denizli left the club after Ansarifard resigned as chairman in June 2007.

==== Afshin Ghotbi: Emperor epoch ====
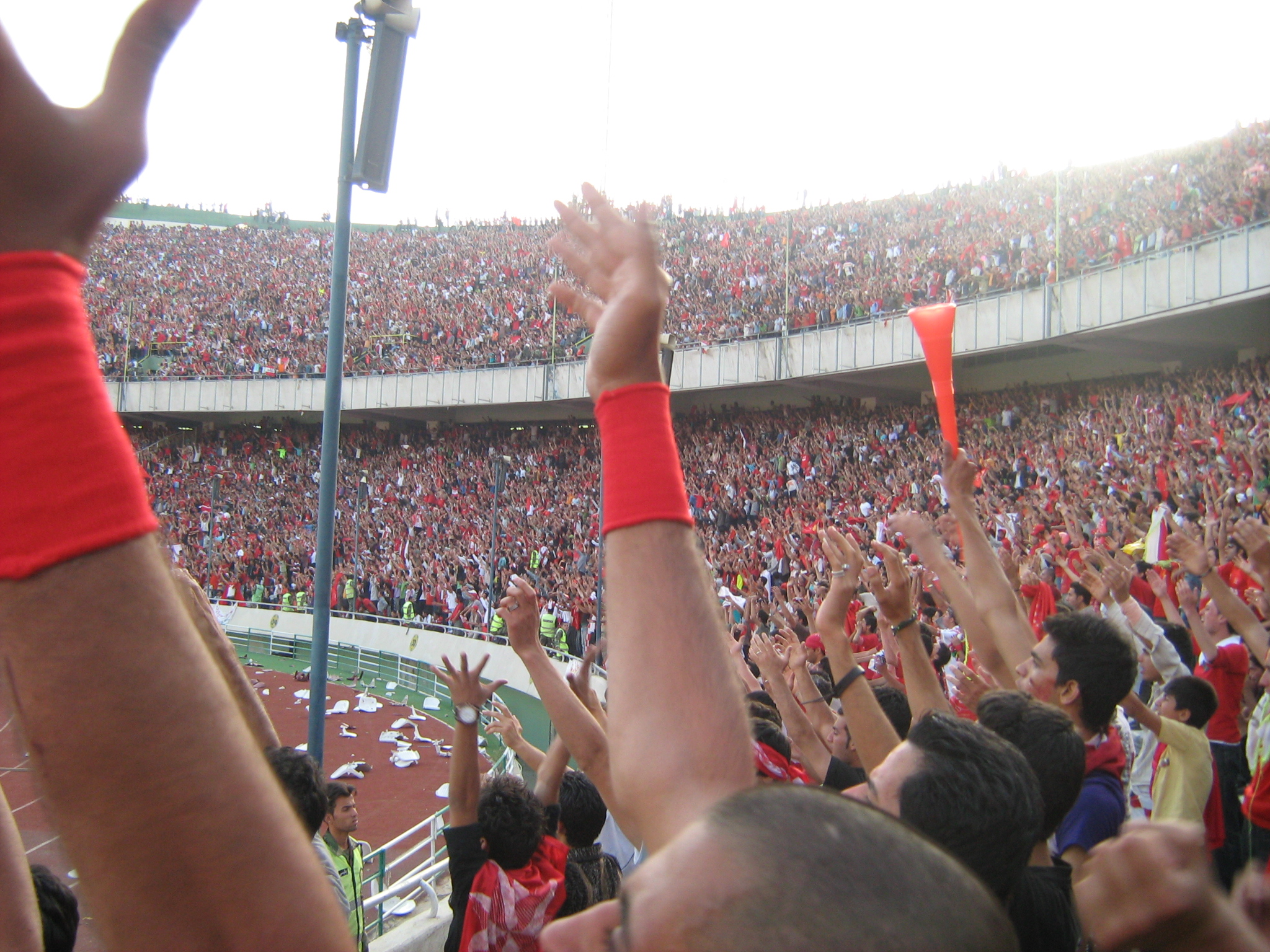
Fans celebrating after the club won the title in the 2007–08 season

Habib Kashani became the club chairman in June 2007 and selected Afshin Ghotbi as head coach of Persepolis for the 2007–08 season. Ghotbi promised to lead Persepolis to the IPL championship; the club started the IPL with a 3–2 win over Sanat Naft. Persepolis was undefeated until the 17th round, where they suffered a 2–1 loss to Sepahan. On 9 January 2008, the disciplinary committee of the FFIRI penalized Sepahan with a five-point deduction because its fans had seriously injured a security soldier. This was later reduced to three points. Persepolis was also docked six points by FIFA because of unpaid wages to a number of former players. This placed Persepolis behind Sepahan in the standings. Near the end of the season, Sheys Rezaei and Mohammad Reza Mamani were expelled by the team after both players showed poor behaviour towards club players, coaches and management, and for other non-football related issues. Habib Kashani and Mahmoud Khordbin both suffered heart attacks during the season. Persepolis cut Sepahan's seven-point lead to two points by the last game of the season. In the last week, Persepolis defeated Sepahan, when Sepehr Heidari scored a 90+6th-minute goal in front of over 110,000 fans in Azadi Stadium, earning Persepolis its second championship in the IPL and a slot in the Asian Champions League. Persepolis, Ghotbi, and Mohsen Khalili won the Team, Manager and Player of the year titles at the 2007–2008 Golden Ball awards.

Ghotbi's contract expired at the end of the season and he decided to leave the club. His assistant, Hamid Estili, was very close to management but Kashani and other club officials resigned because of conflicts between them and the Iran Physical Education Department. Dariush Mostafavi was then selected as club chairman. Mostafavi promised to bring Ghotbi back. Negotiations were successful, and on 4 July 2008, Ghotbi signed a two-year contract with Persepolis. Ghotbi had many problems with Mostafavi and resigned on 19 November 2008. When talking to the popular Iranian show 90, Ghotbi teared up when discussing leaving Persepolis and the fans who had given him the nickname Emperor. Ghotbi left the team in mid-season after a series of losses and eventually became head coach of the Iran national football team.

After the resignation of Ghotbi, his assistant Afshin Peyrovani was named as interim head coach of the club; he led the team in 11 matches in Iran Pro League, and was replaced with former Portugal and Saudi Arabia manager, Nelo Vingada. Vingada's contract was terminated at the end of the season.

==== Daei years ====
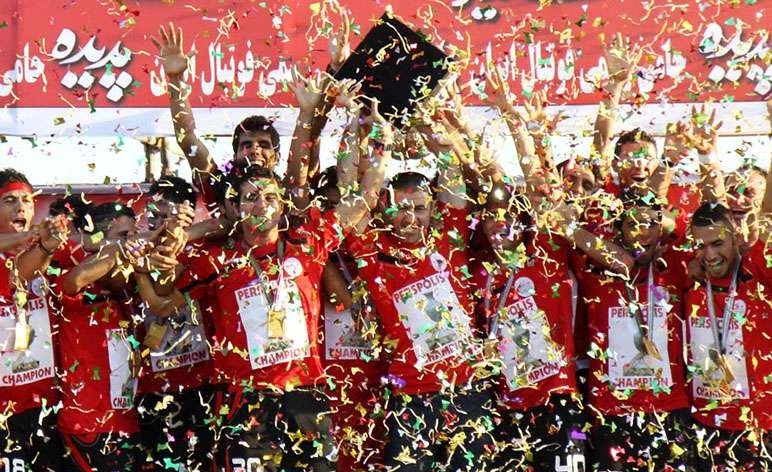
Persepolis players celebrating after winning the 2010–11 Hazfi Cup

After Vingada was fired as head coach of the club, former Croatia and Dinamo Zagreb manager Zlatko Kranjčar was hired as his successor, but he was quickly replaced with former Persepolis and Iran national football team captain, Ali Daei. At the end of the 2009–10 Season, Persepolis finished fourth in the league, but they won the Hazfi Cup. In the Hazfi Cup final, Persepolis defeated Azadegan League club Gostaresh Foolad Tabriz 4–1 on aggregate to qualify for the 2011 AFC Champions League. In the 2010–11 season, Persepolis finished fourth in the league and was eliminated in the group stage of the 2011 AFC Champions League. At the end of the season, Persepolis won the 2010–11 Hazfi Cup after defeating rivals Sepahan, Foolad and Malavan. The technical committee chose Hamid Estili as Daei's successor on that day. Under the management of Daei, Persepolis won back to back trophies for the first time in 13 seasons.

After Daei's resignation, Hamid Estili, Mustafa Denizli, Manuel José and Yahya Golmohammadi managed Persepolis, for a record four head coaches over two seasons. Golmohammadi led Persepolis to the final of the Hazfi Cup, where they lost to Sepahan on penalties. After the Hazfi Cup, Golmohammadi announced that he would not be managing Persepolis the following season.

Daei returned to the club and signed a three years contract before the start of 2013–14 season. Under Daei, Persepolis finished second with 55 points, 2 points behind champions Foolad. Persepolis retained its place in the AFC Champions League after a two-year absence. After a poor start to the 2014–15 season which left Persepolis in 9th place, Daei was sacked and replaced by Hamid Derakhshan.

==== Ivanković years ====
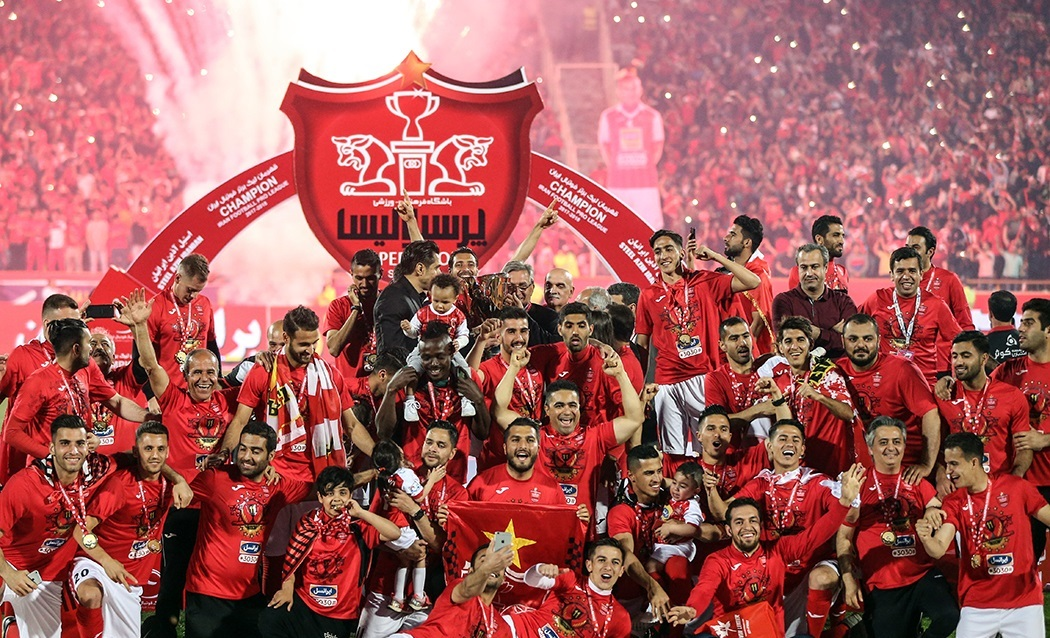
Persepolis players celebrating winning the 2017–18 season

On 5 April 2015, Hamid Derakhshan resigned as head coach of Persepolis and was temporarily replaced by Hossein Abdi. On the following day, former Iran national football team manager Branko Ivanković was named as new head coach of the club.

On 15 May 2015, Ivanković won his first Tehran derby after a 1–0 victory over Esteghlal. Later that week, on 19 May 2015, Persepolis defeated Al-Hilal 1–0 in the first leg of AFC Champions League round of 16. In the second leg they lost 3–0 against Al-Hilal and were eliminated.

After the departure of Mohammad Nouri, the club named Hadi Norouzi as the captain for the 2015–16 season. Persepolis was also very active in the summer transfer season, adding Iranian international Ramin Rezaeian, Croatian defender Luka Marić and Honduras international Jerry Bengtson.

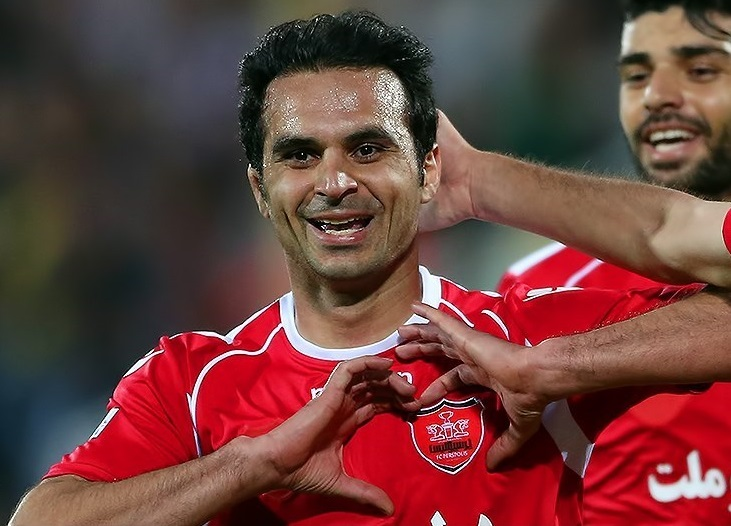
Hadi Norouzi celebrating a goal

On 1 October 2015, club captain Hadi Norouzi died in his sleep at the age of 30 after an apparent heart attack. After Norouzi's death, Persepolis improved their form and won several games in a row, propelling them to the top 3 midway through the season. After a historic 4–2 win against Esteghlal in the Tehran derby, the team moved into first place. However, after a loss to Naft Tehran on 28 April, the team dropped down to third place. Persepolis won the following week's match against Gostaresh Foolad and moved into second place, behind Esteghlal Khuzestan on goal difference. A final day win on 13 May 2016 against Rah Ahan was not enough for Persepolis, as Esteghlal Khuzestan also won their game and were crowned champions of Persian Gulf Pro League 2015–16.

Before the 2016–17 season, Persepolis added national team members Alireza Beiranvand, Jalal Hosseini and Vahid Amiri. Persepolis started the season strong and never dropped below third place. They set records for the lowest number of goals conceded and most points accumulated after 17 weeks in a Persian Gulf Pro League season. On 15 April 2017, Persepolis became the champions of the season with three weeks remaining until the end of the season. After a victory against Machine Sazi, Persepolis claimed its third championship in the Persian Gulf Pro League and its 10th championship in total. Persepolis defended its championship in the Persian Gulf Pro League 2017–18 and won Super cup.

On 30 May 2017, Persepolis advanced to the quarterfinals in the AFC Champions League, for the first time in its current format, after defeating Qatari club Lekhwiya 1–0 in the Round of 16. Persepolis beat Saudi club Al Ahli 5–3 on aggregate to make it to the semi-finals, where they lost to Al Hilal 6–2 on aggregate. In 2018, Persepolis advanced to the AFC Champions League finals, losing 2–0 in the first leg. Persepolis were held to a goalless draw by the Kashima Antlers of Japan in the second leg of the AFC Champions League. On 16 May 2019, Ivanković lead the team to a Persian Gulf Pro League championship with a hat-trick. He left the club at the end of season after four years, winning a record seven trophies for a foreign coach.

== Colours and crest ==
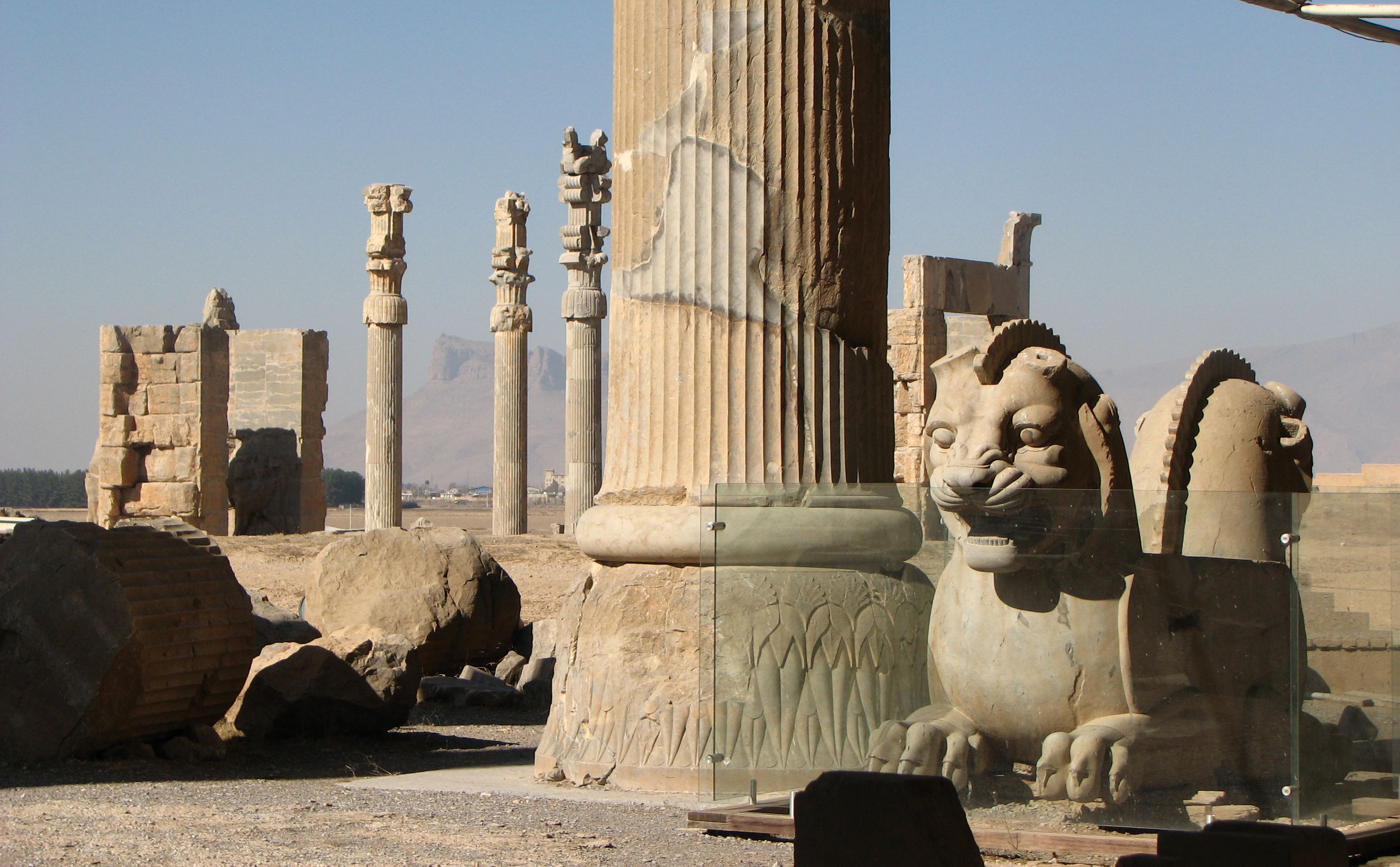
The Persian column from Persepolis serves as a symbol for the team.

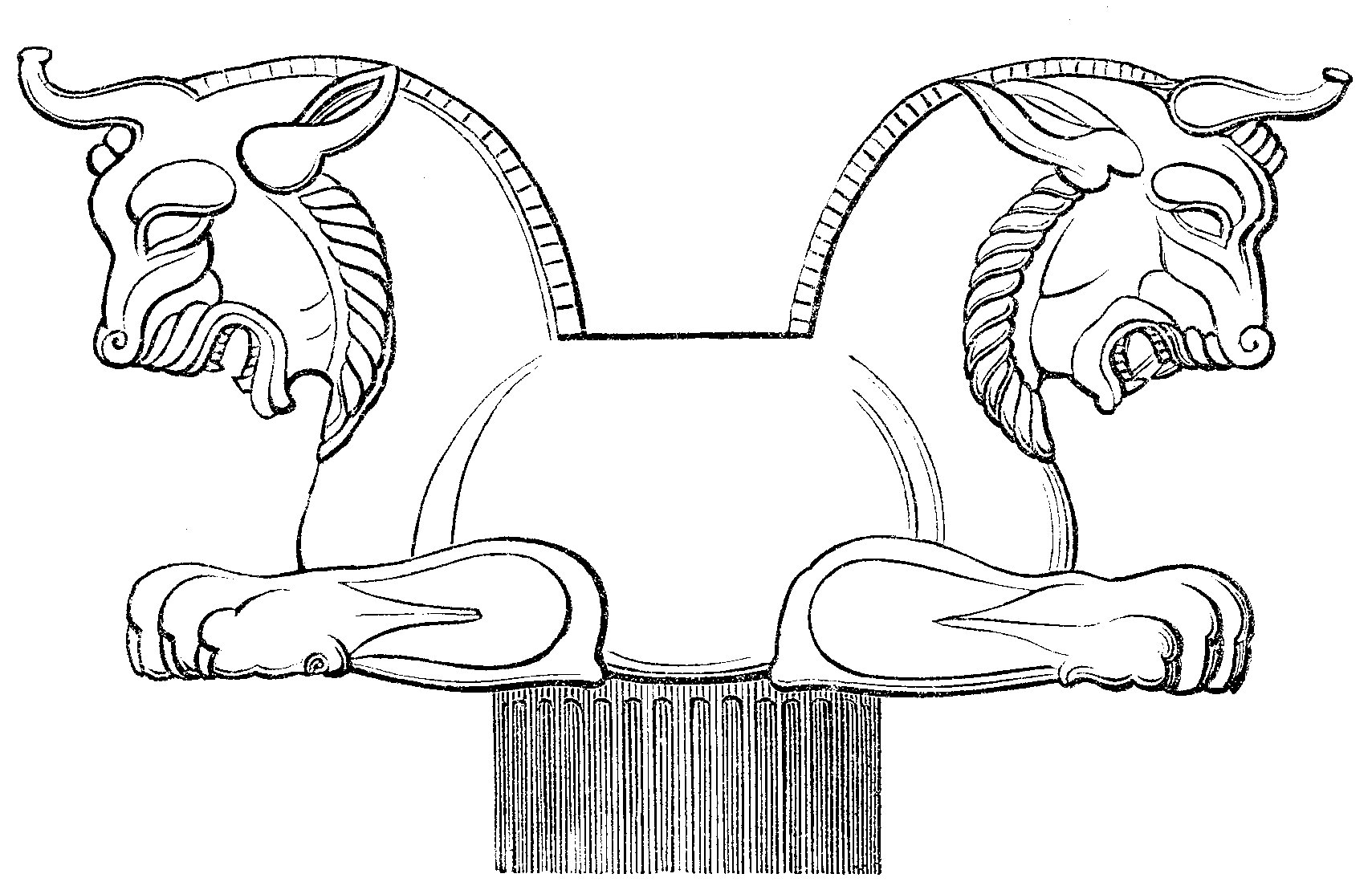
An illustration of a column at Apadana, from the Illustrerad verldshistoria utgifven

Persepolis Football Club was named after Persepolis, the capital of the Achaemenid Empire. The club logo incorporates elements from the location. The first design of Persepolis' crest used the Faravahar, an ancient Persian and Zoroastrian symbol depicting a man with three-feathered falcon wings. After using the crest on its shirt in its early years, the team stopped including the crest on its shirt until the 1980s. In the middle of the 1980s, the team created a new crest based on an image depicted on a column at Apadana. The image consists of two bull heads attached to one body, with a cup on top and the Olympic symbols underneath. The bull is a symbol of productivity in ancient Persian beliefs and Persian Literature, and the cup on the top of the column represents the championship. The team then changed the crest again in the middle of the 1990s to a more stylised image: the crest became bent and the Olympic rings were dropped, the cup became more explicit, and the bull heads leaned toward the cup. This version was used until 2004, when the team restored the Olympic rings and replaced the bulls with the Homa, a mythological bird and symbol used in the architecture of Persepolis. During the 2011–2012 season, and before 74th Tehran derby, the club released a new version of its logo This current version of the club's logo incorporates the previous version into a red shield-shaped frame and includes the name of Persepolis in Persian and English. One of Persepolis' nicknames is Sorkhpoushan (transl. "the reds"; Persian: سرخپوشان), stemming from their traditional kit, which is predominantly red. From the foundation of the club, the common home kit includes a red shirt, red (in some seasons black or white) shorts and red socks. White and black colours are also seen in the kit. In the early 1970s, the players wore black shorts. White shorts were used in the late 1970s, and red shorts became predominant in the 1980s.

In the 2006–07 season, fans saw the team wear red-and-white striped shirts. The away kit of the club usually includes a white background.

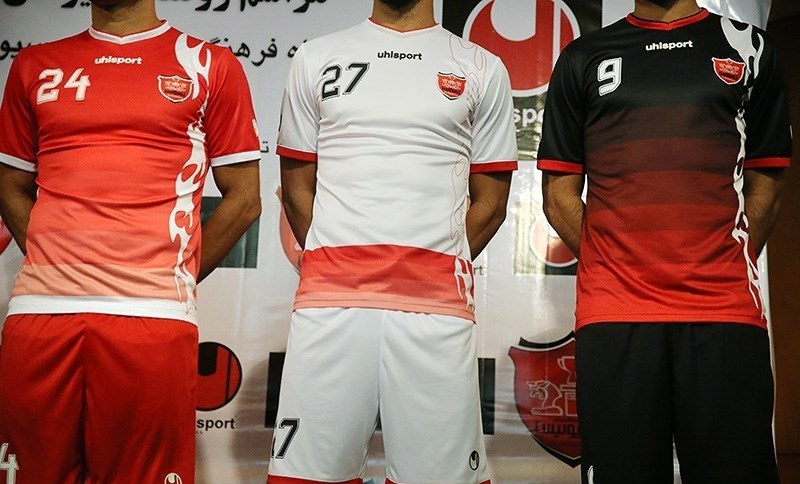
Persepolis' kits in 2015–16 season

Historical kits

1971–72 First National League Title	Shishtayiha Match 1973	1975–76 3rd National League Title	ACL 3rd place, 1999–2000 League Title	2001–02 1st IPL and 8th National League Title	2007–08 2nd IPL and 9th National League Title	2009–10; 4th Hazfi Cup	2010–11; 5th Hazfi Cup	10–10–3 Match 2012

2016–17 3rd IPL and 10th National League Title	2017–18 4th IPL and 11th National League Title	2018 ACL Final, 2018–19 League and 6th Hazfi cup	2019–20; Persian Gulf Pro League	2020 AFC Champions League Final

== Stadium and facilities ==
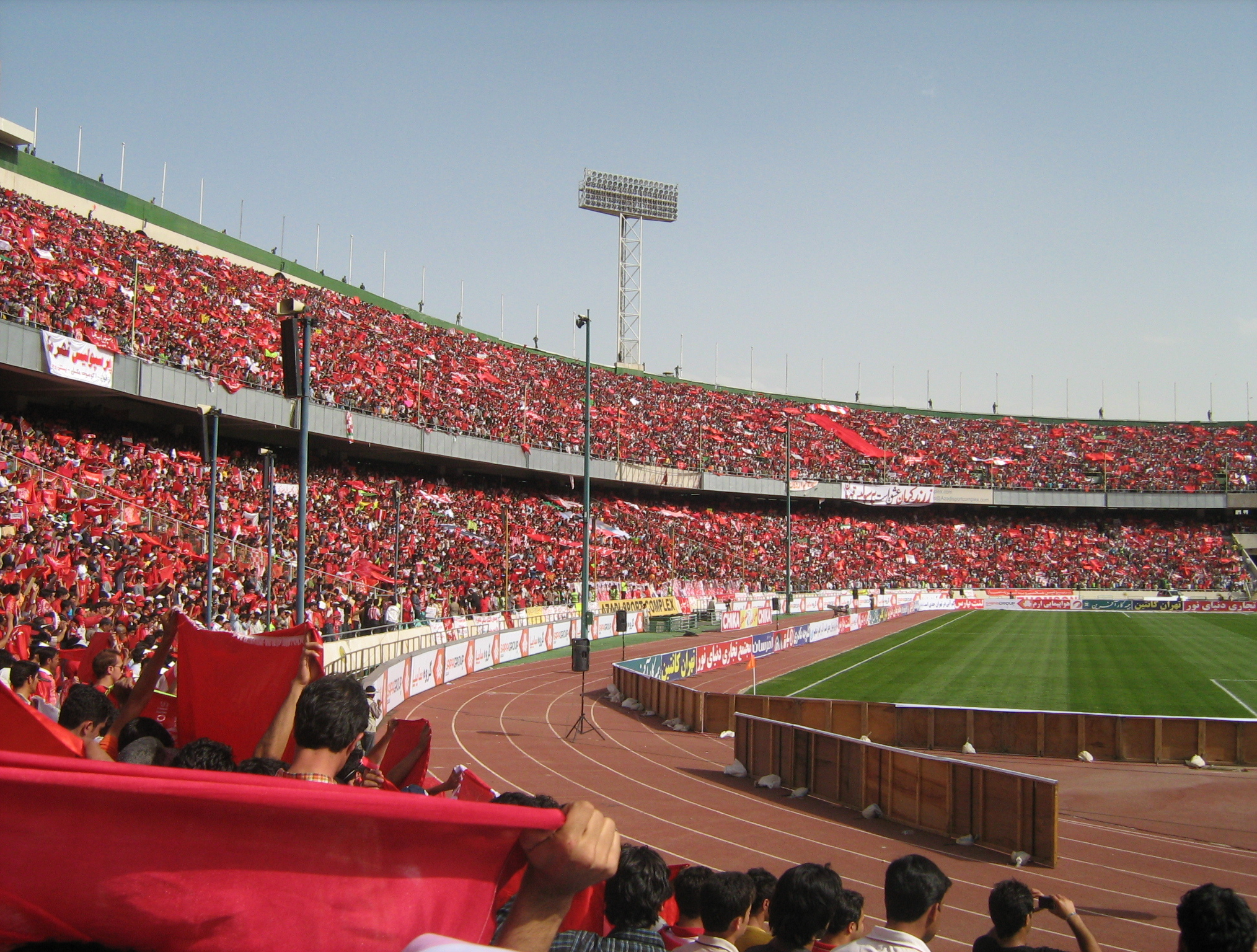
17 May 2008: Persepolis-Sepahan match during the last week of the 7th IPL at the Azadi Stadium. Azadi Stadium hosted over 100,000 fans for the match.

When Persepolis was founded, the football team did not have a stadium, although it had gymnasiums, swimming pools and bowling alleys. Ali Abdo bought some land in the Ekbatan area of Tehran and constructed a stadium there. At the time, it was known as Apadana Stadium. Persepolis played only one game at the stadium because the seating was poorly organised and other Iranian clubs would not cooperate to play there. Persepolis then used the stadium as a training ground.

Around the mid-1970s, Abdo had to sell much of the club's property to keep the club functioning due to its poor financial situation; he sold Apadana Stadium to Rah Ahan for 200,000 tomans in 1975. Apadana Stadium is now called Rah Ahan Stadium. Due to the Iranian Islamic Revolution in 1979, club properties were confiscated by the Oppressed and Veterans Foundation. Bowling Abdo, the club's original headquarters, was burnt down, and Abdo returned to the United States.

=== Azadi Stadium ===
Before the construction of Azadi Stadium in 1971, Persepolis played its matches at Amjadieh (Shahid Shiroudi) Stadium. Since 1973, Persepolis has started playing in Azadi stadium as its home ground. The team has played almost all of their home games at Azadi Stadium, except for the 2002–03 season, when they played all but two of their home matches at Tehran's Takhti Stadium while renovations were taking place at Azadi.

In mid-2006, Persepolis considered buying Shahre Ghods Stadium, but the deal fell through due to Persepolis' poor financial situation and the long distance between the city center and the stadium.

Persepolis has played Estheghlal 85 times in this stadium, with 25 wins to Esthaghlal, 21 wins to Persepolis, and 39 draws. This derby is regarded as the biggest in Asia, and one of the world, in terms of same city rivals.

=== Derafshifar Stadium ===
Derafshifar Stadium, Persepolis' training camp

Derafshifar Stadium is Persepolis' training ground and academy base. Inside the complex, there are training areas, a hotel and pools. There is also a sauna, steam and weight rooms, a restaurant, conference rooms and offices. The stadium was given to Persepolis in 2013 with the support of team president Mohammad Rouyanian.

=== Shahid Kazemi Stadium ===
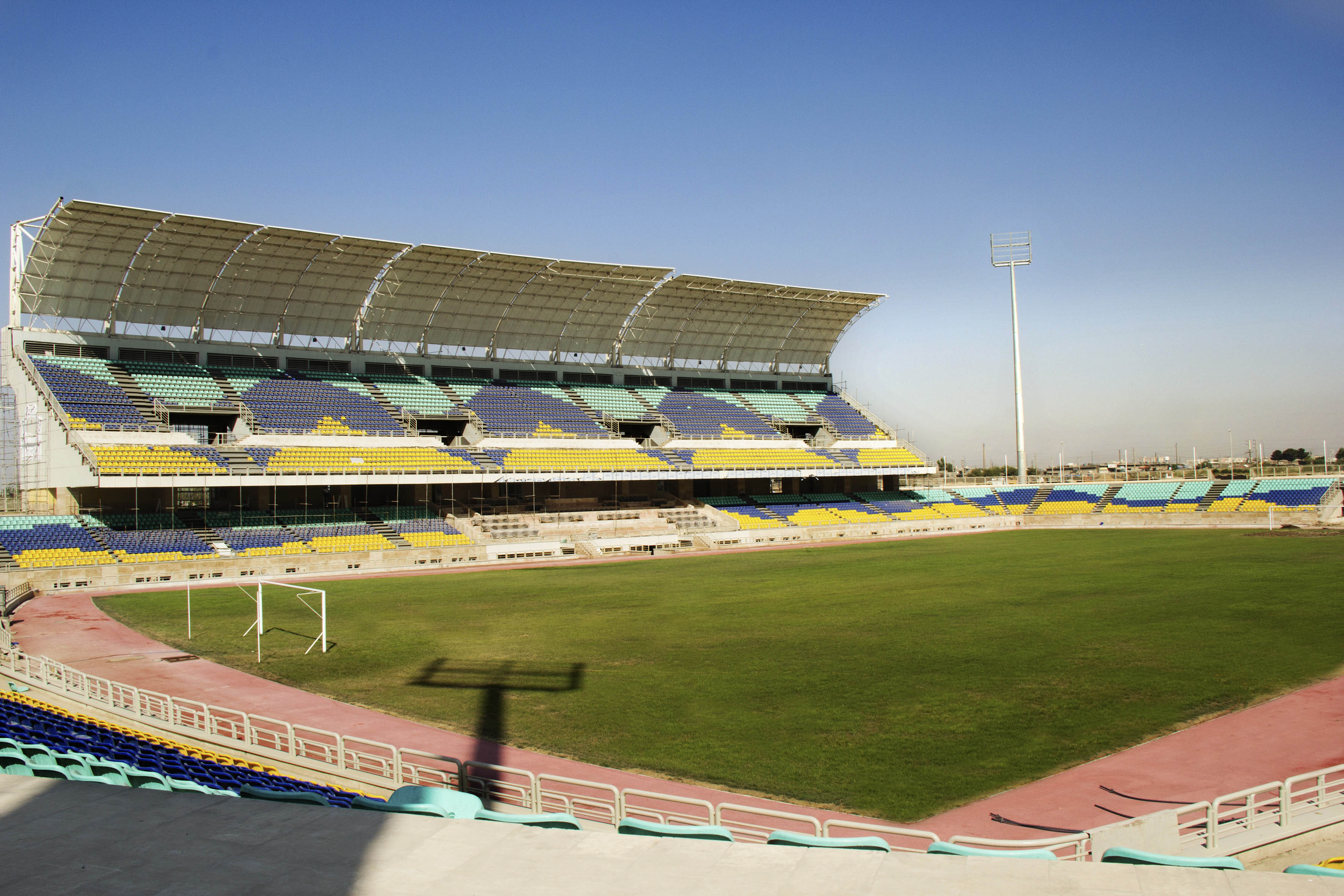
Kazemi Stadium hosted the club's training since 2017

Persepolis became the owner of Shahid Kazemi Stadium in the winter of 2016. The stadium, with a capacity of 15,000, is used for training sessions and friendly matches. The complex has a sauna, steam room, weight room, restaurant and conference room. In January 2017, the club announced they would renovate the complex by adding a second natural grass pitch, parking lots and a cafeteria, as well as upgrading the conference room, locker room, gym and swimming pool.

=== Persepolis University ===
Persepolis opened the first Iranian sport university in 2013. Dariuosh Soudi was appointed as the first president of the university and Mehdi Mahdavikia was the first student of this university. This university has 600 students and accepts students in thirteen different fields, including football and futsal coaching, fitness, sports reporting and match commentary.

=== Persepolis TV and internet radio ===
In June 2013, Persepolis launched Persepolis TV, available on Hot Bird satellite television. The manager of Persepolis TV was Reza Rashidpour. The channel closed in October 2013, and was relaunched during the 2017–18 season.

The team also operates an internet radio station through its official website. The station includes recordings that can be downloaded. Rouyanian negotiated an agreement with "Iran Seda" to air live commentary of the 77th Tehran derby, commentated by Eskandar Koti.

=== Food and drink ===
The club began selling energy drinks in 2013. The club also established three restaurants to improve its finances and bring in fans. The first restaurant opened in Shiraz. As of June 2023, all three restaurants have closed.

== Rivalries ==
=== Tehran Derby ===
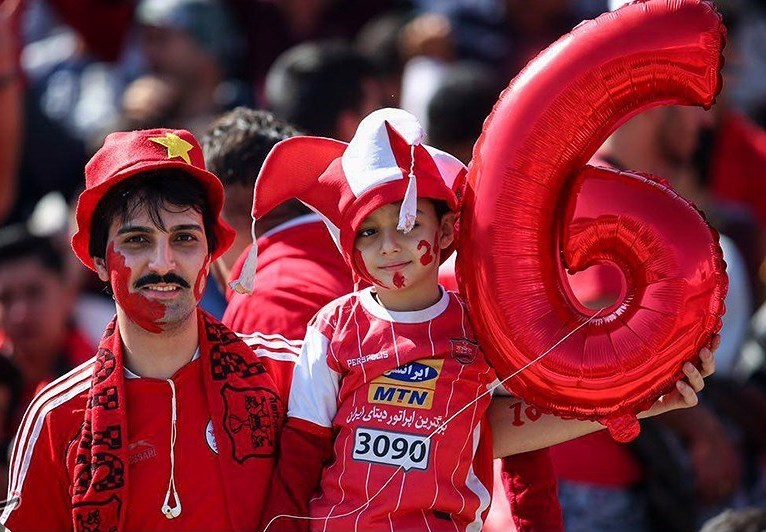
A Persepolis fan shows holds up a balloon depicting the number "6", referring to Persepolis' 6–0 win against Esteghlal in 1973

Persepolis plays in the Tehran Derby against Esteghlal; their rivalry is derived from the previous significant derby between Shahin and Taj. After the departure of Shahin players to Persepolis, the club became popular and its archrival Taj (meaning "crown" in Persian) was supported by the Shah of Iran, Mohammad Reza. The Derby was declared the most important derby in Asia and the 22nd most important derby in the world in June 2008 by World Soccer. Persepolis has the largest margin of victory, having defeated Esteghlal 6–0 on 7 September 1973.

=== Persepolis vs Sepahan ===
Persepolis has a rivalry with Sepahan, which is based in Isfahan. Both clubs were dependent upon Shahin; one hired most of the Shahin players in its early years and the other was the branch of Shahin F.C. in Isfahan. The rivalry renewed in the early 2000s, when Isfahan's teams—Sepahan and Zob Ahan—Sepahan won IPL and the Hazfi Cup. Persepolis also had a derby against the now dissolved club, Pas Tehran.

=== Persepolis vs Tractor ===
Persepolis started a rivalry with Tractor S.C. when they returned to the first tier of Iranian football league after eight years.

== Players ==
=== First-team squad ===
As of 26 August 2026

Note: Flags indicate national team as defined under FIFA eligibility rules; some limited exceptions apply. Players may hold more than one non-FIFA nationality.

No.	Pos.	Nation	Player
1	GK	IRI	Payam Niazmand (4th captain)
3	DF	IRI	Abolfazl Jalali
4	DF	IRI	Mohammadmehdi Zare
5	DF	IRI	Hossein Abarghouei
6	DF	IRI	Hossein Kanaanizadegan (captain)
7	MF	IRI	Mohammad Omri
8	MF	IRI	Mehdi Tikdari
9	FW	IRI	Ali Alipour (vice-captain)
10	MF	IRI	Mohammadmehdi Mohebi
11	FW	UZB	Igor Sergeev
20	DF	IRI	Majid Eidi
21	FW	IRI	Pouria Shahrabadi ^{U21}
22	GK	IRI	Amirreza Rafiei ^{U25}

No.	Pos.	Nation	Player
23	MF	CGO	Thievy Bifouma
33	DF	HUN	Dániel Gera
34	MF	IRI	Amirhossein Mahmoudi ^{U21}
45	MF	IRI	Mohammadhossein Sadeghi ^{U23}
58	DF	IRI	Amirhossein Taheri ^{U23}
66	MF	IRI	Pouya Pourali
70	MF	UZB	Oston Urunov (3rd captain)
77	MF	IRI	Mohammad Khodabandelou
80	MF	IRI	Yasin Salmani ^{U25}
88	MF	MNE	Marko Bakić
89	DF	IRI	Danial Eiri ^{U23}
99	MF	IRI	Pouria Latififar ^{U23}

=== Reserve Squad ===
Note: Flags indicate national team as defined under FIFA eligibility rules; some limited exceptions apply. Players may hold more than one non-FIFA nationality.

No.	Pos.	Nation	Player
27	MF	IRI	Mehdi Cheshmberah ^{U19}
38	DF	IRI	Mohammadreza Mirshafieian ^{U21}
63	DF	IRI	Pouya Esmi ^{U17}

No.	Pos.	Nation	Player
64	GK	IRI	Amirmohammad Ghazvineh ^{U21}
74	DF	IRI	Alireza Homaeifard ^{U21}

=== Out on loan ===
Note: Flags indicate national team as defined under FIFA eligibility rules; some limited exceptions apply. Players may hold more than one non-FIFA nationality.

No.	Pos.	Nation	Player
—	GK	IRI	Mohammad Gandomi ^{U21} (at Nirooye Zamini until 30 June 2027)
—	DF	IRI	Farzin Moamelegari ^{U23} (at Malavan until 30 June 2027)
—	DF	IRI	Yaghoub Barajeh ^{U21} (at Nassaji until 30 June 2027)
—	MF	IRI	Alireza Enayatzadeh^{U23} (at Mes Shahr-e Babak until 30 June 2027)
—	MF	IRI	Kourosh Ezhdehakosh ^{U19} (at Nassaji until 30 June 2027)
—	FW	IRI	Mojtaba Fakhrian (at Gol Gohar until 30 June 2027)

=== Retired numbers ===
No.	Player	Position	Persepolis debut	Last match	Ref.
12	Fans	—	—	—	
24	(Iran) Hadi Norouzi	MF/FW	24 October 2008	25 September 2015	

On 6 October 2015, the club retired number 24 in memory of Hadi Norouzi, who died of a heart attack at age 30.

=== Notable players ===
For notable players see List of Persepolis F.C. players.
For details on former players see Category:Persepolis F.C. players.

=== Club captains ===
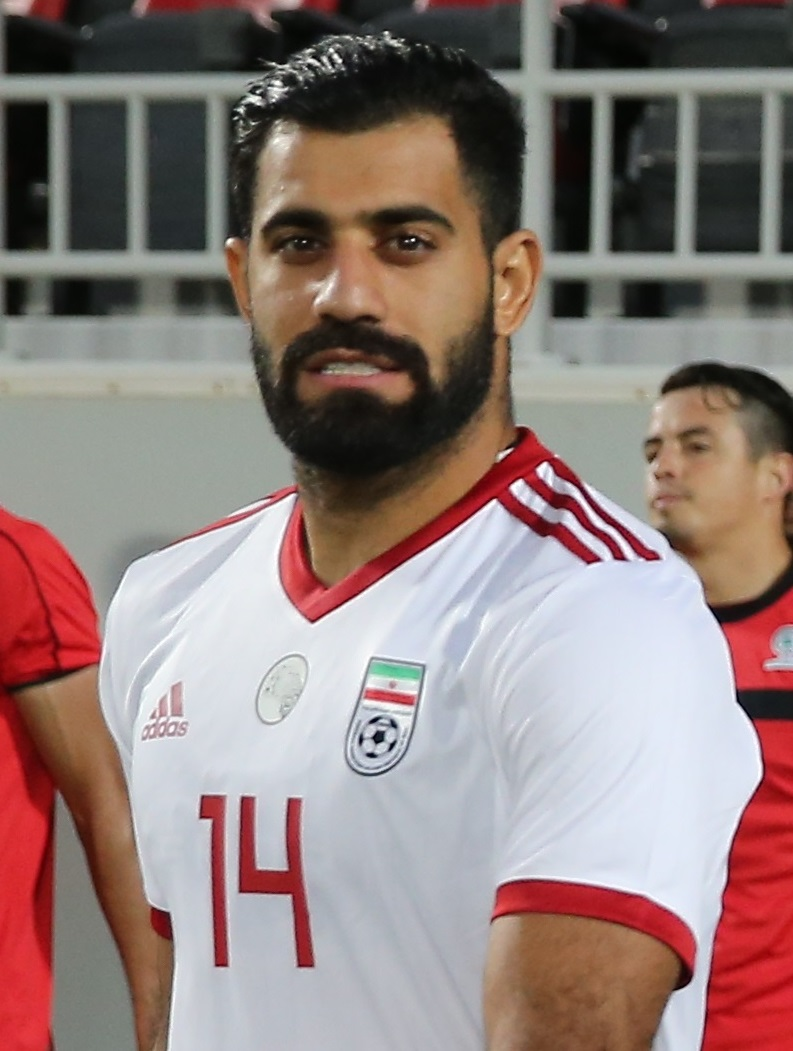
Hossein Kanaanizadegan is the current captain of Persepolis.

#	Name	Nat	Career in Persepolis	Captaincy	Shirt No.
1	Hamid Jasemian^{⚱}	(Iran)	1968–69	1968–69	5
2	Aziz Asli^{⚱}	(Iran)	1968–71	1969–71	1
3	Buyuk Vatankhah	(Iran)	1968–69; 1970–74	1971–72	6
4	Homayoun Behzadi^{⚱}	(Iran)	1967–68; 1969–75	1972–74	10
5	Jafar Kashani^{⚱}	(Iran)	1968–69; 1970–75	1974	4
6	Ebrahim Ashtiani^{⚱}	(Iran)	1968–69; 1970–76	1974–76	2
7	Ali Parvin	(Iran)	1970–88	1976–88	7
8	Mohammad Mayeli Kohan	(Iran)	1976–90	1988–89	19
9	Mohammad Panjali	(Iran)	1977–87; 1989–94	1989–94	5
10	Farshad Pious	(Iran)	1985–88; 1989–97	1994–96	17
11	Mojtaba Moharrami	(Iran)	1988–97	1996–97	8
12	Hossein Abdi	(Iran)	1987–2000	1997–2000	12
13	Ahmad Reza Abedzadeh	(Iran)	1994–01	2000–01	1
14	Afshin Peyrovani	(Iran)	1993–96; 1997–04	2001–04	5
15	Behrouz Rahbarifar	(Iran)	1994–03; 2004–06	2004–06	20
16	Karim Bagheri	(Iran)	1996–97; 2002–10	2006–10	6
17	Sheys Rezaei	(Iran)	2003–08; 2009–12	2010	13
18	Sepehr Heidari	(Iran)	2007–11	2011	3
19	Ali Karimi	(Iran)	1998–01; 2008–09; 2011–13	2011–12	8
20	Mehdi Mahdavikia	(Iran)	1995–98; 2012–13	2012–13	2
21	Mohammad Nouri	(Iran)	2010–15	2013–15	14
22	Hadi Norouzi^{⚱}	(Iran)	2008–13; 2014–15	2015	24
23	Alireza Nourmohammadi	(Iran)	2010–16	2015–16	20
24	Jalal Hosseini	(Iran)	2012–14; 2016–22	2016–22	4
25	Omid Alishah	(Iran)	2013–26	2022–26	2
26	Hossein Kanaanizadegan	(Iran)	2011–16; 2019–21; 2023–	2026–	6

^{⚱} Passed Away

=== Hall of Fame ===
The players below are part of the Persepolis F.C. Hall of Fame:

- (Iran) Ebrahim Ashtiani (DF)
- (Iran) Homayoun Behzadi (FW)
- (Iran) Hamid Jasemian (DF)
- (Iran) Hossein Kalani (FW)
- (Iran) Jafar Kashani (DF)
- (Iran) Mahmoud Khordbin (FW)
- (Iran) Fereydoun Moeini (MF)
- (Iran) Ali Parvin (MF)
- (Iran) Kazem Rahimi (MF)
- (Iran) Hadi Tavoosi (GK)
- (Iran) Büyük Vatankhah (DF)
- (Iran) Reza Vatankhah (DF)

== Managers ==
=== Notable managers ===
The table below shows Persepolis managers who have won noteworthy titles or had a great impact on the team.

Name	Nat	Period	Trophies
Parviz Dehdari	(Iran)	1968–69	Tehran Hazfi Cup: 1969 Runner-up; Asian Club Championship Qualification: 1969 Winner
Alan Rogers	(England)	1971–76	Iran local league: 1971–72 Winner; Takht Jamshid Cup: 1973–74 Winner – 1974–75 Runner-up
Buyuk Vatankhah	(Iran)	1976	Takht Jamshid Cup: 1975–76 Winner
Ali Parvin	(Iran)	1982–93; 1998–03; 2005–06	Persian Gulf Pro League: 2001–02 Winner; Azadegan League: 1998–99, 1999–00 Winners – 1992–93, 2000–01 Runners-up; Qods League: 1990 Runner-up; Tehran Province League: 1983, 1987, 1988, 1989, 1990, 1991 Winners – 1982, 1984, 1992 Runner-up; Tehran Hazfi Cup: 1982, 1987 Winners – 1981 Runner-up; Hazfi Cup: 1988, 1992, 1998–99 Winners; Asian Cup Winners' Cup: 1991 Winner – 1993 Runner-up; Asian Club Championship: 1999–2000 semi-finals (3rd place), 2000–01 semi-finals (3rd place)
Stanko Poklepović	(Croatia)	1995–97	Azadegan League: 1995–96, 1996–97 Winners; Asian Club Championship: 1996–97 semi-finals (3rd place)
Mustafa Denizli	(Turkey)	2006–07; 2011–12	Hazfi Cup: 2005–06 Runner-up
Afshin Ghotbi	(Iran)	2007–08	Persian Gulf Pro League: 2007–08 Winner
Ali Daei	(Iran)	2009–11; 2013–14	Persian Gulf Pro League: 2013–14 Runner-up; Hazfi Cup: 2009–10, 2010–11 Winners
Branko Ivanković	(Croatia)	2015–19	Persian Gulf Pro League: 2016–17, 2017–18, 2018–19 Winners, 2015–16 Runner-up; Hazfi Cup: 2018–19 Winner; Super Cup: 2017, 2018, 2019 Winners; AFC Champions League: 2017 semi-finals, 2018 Runners up
Yahya Golmohammadi	(Iran)	2012–13; 2020–24	Persian Gulf Pro League: 2019–20, 2020–21, 2022–23 Winners, 2021–22 Runner-up; Hazfi Cup: 2022–23 Winner, 2013 Runner-up; Super Cup: 2020, 2023 Winner; AFC Champions League: 2020 Runners up

== Personnel ==
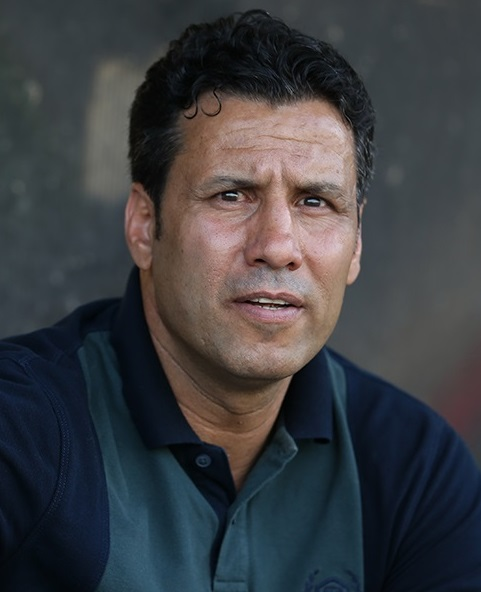
Mehdi Tartar, current head coach of the club

=== Technical staff ===
Position	Staff
Head Coach	Mehdi Tartar
First-team coaches	Rafael Toledo
Assistant coaches	Karim Bagheri
Fitness and Athletic Coaches	Jose Augusto Losada Benítez; Juliano Valim
Assistant Fitness coach	Saman Eskandari
Goalkeeping coach	Emilio Álvarez
Assistant Goalkeeping coach	Javad Bagheri
Match Analyst	Uendell Macedo Silva
Analyzers	Siamak Tehrani
Head of the medical committee	Dr. Farid Zarineh
Club doctor	Dr. Alireza Ghalyayi
Physiotherapist	Ali Azam Moadi
Academy director	Mohsen Khalili
U21 Head coach	Mahmoud Ansari
U19 Head coach	Mehdi Atalou
U16 Head coach	Farzad Ashoubi
U14 Head coach	Hassan Khanmohammadi
Team Manager	Afshin Peyrovani
Women Team Manager	Hoda Khosh Bayan
Media Officer	Alireza Ashraf
Director of International Relations	Amir Ali Hosseini

Last updated: 11 June 2022
Source: Persepolis F.C.

=== Management ===
Office	Name
Chairman	Peyman Haddadi
Board secretary	Ahad Mirzaei
Board members	Ali Inanlo Mehdi Hemmati Moghaddam; Ahad Mirzaei; Peyman Haddadi

Last updated: 1 July 2023
Source: isna.ir

== Honours ==
Persepolis titles Timeline
← / 🔴
🔴 National League Champions ⚪ Cup Winners ⭕ Super Cup Winners 🏆 Continental champions

Persepolis F.C. Honours
Type		Competition	Titles	Runners-up	Winning Years	Runners-up Years
Domestic	National	League	16	10	1971–72, 1973–74, 1975–76, 1995–96, 1996–97, 1998–99 ^{*}, 1999–2000, 2001–02, 2007–08, 2016–17, 2017–18, 2018–19^{*}, 2019–20, 2020–21, 2022–23^{*}, 2023–24	1974–75, 1976–77, 1977–78, 1989–90, 1992–93, 1993–94, 2000–01, 2013–14, 2015–16, 2021–22
Domestic	National	Hazfi Cup	7	2	1987–88, 1991–92, 1998–99^{*}, 2009–10, 2010–11, 2018–19^{*}, 2022–23^{*}	2005–06, 2012–13
Domestic	National	Super Cup	5	2	2017, 2018, 2019, 2020, 2023	2021, 2024
Domestic	National	Espandi Cup	1	–	1979–80	–
Domestic	Provincial	Tehran Football League	7	4	1982–83, 1986–87 ^{♦}, 1987–88, 1988–89, 1989–90, 1990–91, 2011–12^{♦}	1970–71, 1981–82, 1983–84, 1991–92
Domestic	Provincial	Tehran Hazfi Cup	4	2	1978–79, 1981–82, 1986–87^{♦}, 2011–12^{♦}	1968–69, 1980–81
Continental		Asian Cup Winners' Cup	1	1	1990–91^{¤}	1992–93
Continental		AFC Champions League Elite	–	2	–	2018, 2020

- record
- ^{¤}First ever winners
- ^{*} Won League title and Hazfi Cup
- ^{♦} Won Tehran League title and Tehran Hazfi Cup
- ^{s} shared record

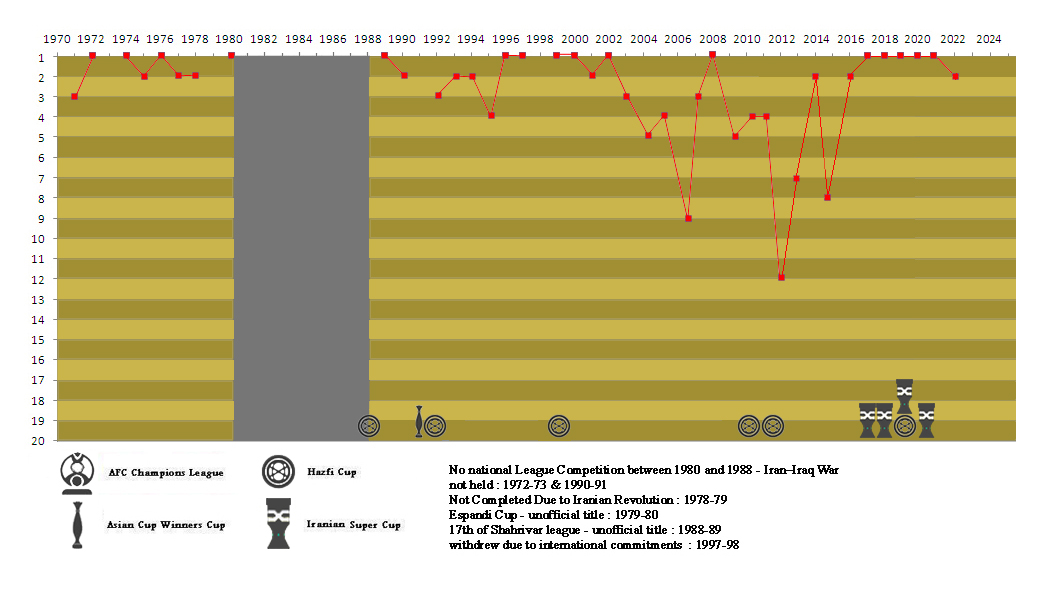
Persepolis' season positions

== Individual honours ==
Asian Young Footballer of the Year

- (Iran) 1997 – Mehdi Mahdavikia

Asian Footballer of the Year

- (Iran) 1990 – Farshad Pious Runner-up
- (Iran) 1996 – Ali Daei Runner-up
- (Iran) 1997 – Khodadad Azizi Runner-up
- (Iran) 1997 – Karim Bagheri Runner-up
- (Iran) 2012 – Ali Karimi Runner-up
- (Iran) 2019 – Alireza Beiranvand Runner-up

Iran World Cup captains

- (Iran) 1978 – Ali Parvin
- (Iran) 1998 – Ahmad Reza Abedzadeh

AFC Asian Cup MVP Award

- (Iran) 1996 – Khodadad Azizi

== Statistics and records ==
Ali Parvin, who played from 1970 to 1988, holds the record for Persepolis appearances with 341. Afshin Peyrovani holds the league appearances records with 209, playing from 1993 to 2004. The record for a goalkeeper is held by Alireza Beiranvand, with 189 appearances. The record for total Persepolis appearances among current players is held by Hadi Norouzi, with 175 appearances and 32 goals.

With 149 caps, Ali Daei of Iran is Persepolis' most capped international player. Farshad Pious is the club's all-time top goalscorer in all competitions with 153 goals in 211 matches, playing between 1985 and 1998. Persepolis set the Iran's league records for most titles (15) and most runners-up (9). The club's all-time top scorer is Farshad Pious with 153 goals. The team has a record for scoring in 36 consecutive matches in two seasons (2014–2015) and a record 22 games unbeaten.

== Ownership ==
Persepolis is publicly owned. Privatisation of both Persepolis and Esteghlal, has failed, most likely due to the government's lack of interest to bequeath the enormous social (and potentially financial) capital of the two clubs to private entities. In May 2009, in the run-up to the 2009 presidential election, President Mahmoud Ahmadinejad stated that the club would be privatised. A second much anticipated bid in May 2015 was called null and void after Persepolis fan and tycoon Hossein Hedayat was found unqualified by Iranian Privatization Organization. It is expected that the transfer of the club to private investors will be a long process, largely due to problems with the club's financial documents and the debts that the club has accumulated, which make it unable to be listed on the Tehran Stock Exchange. Shares for the club can be sold on the OTC market once it has removed all of its financial ambiguities.

== Sponsorship ==
- Main sponsor: DARIA
- Official shirt manufacturer: Merooj
- Sponsor: Bank Shahr
- Water supplier: Veensu

=== Shirt sponsors and manufacturers ===
Persepolis League Sponsors
Period	Kit Manufacturer	Shirt Sponsor		
2016–17^{¤}	Joma	Hamrahe Aval		
2017–18	Joma	Irancell		
2018–19	Li-Ning	Irancell		
2019–20	Uhlsport	Irancell		Tourism Bank
2020–21	Uhlsport	Tourism Bank		
2021–22	Uhlsport	Tourism Bank		Irancell
2022–23	Uhlsport	Irancell		
2023–24	Merooj	Irancell		
2024–25	Merooj	Saba Battery		
2025–26	Merooj	Tabiat	Bank Shahr	DARIA
2026–27	Yousef Jameh	Red Bank	DARIA	

^{¤} in 2016–17 Persepolis wore Givova kits for the first ten matches of the season.

== Supporters ==
Persepolis is one of the most supported teams in Iranian football. Unofficial counts indicate that the club has over 40 million fans. The club is based in Tehran and is popular in all parts of country. Persepolis also has a fan base in Afghanistan and Persian Gulf countries.

=== Famous fans ===
- Mohammad Khatami, Former President of Iran
- Mohammad Reza Khatami, politician
- Sohrab Sepehri, Poet
- Houshang Ebtehaj, Poet
- Davoud Rashidi, Actor
- Khosro Shakibaei, Actor
- Morteza Ahmadi, Actor
- Masoud Kimiai, Director
- Tahmineh Milani, Director
- Masoud Behnoud, Journalist
- Mahmoud Khayami, Founder of Iran Khodro
- Hossein Sabet, Businessman and former owner of Dariush Grand Hotel
- Mohammad Reza Shajarian, Singer
- Homayoun Shajarian, Singer
- Pejman Bazeghi, actor
- Kambiz Dirbaz, actor

== Affiliated clubs ==
- (Italy) AC Milan
- (Russia) Rubin Kazan
- (Portugal) Beira-Mar
- (Spain) Real Madrid

== Reserve teams ==
- Persepolis Academy
- Persepolis B
- Persepolis Qaemshahr
- Persepolis Shomal
- Persepolis women
