= Tehranjavan F.C. =

Iranian football club

Tehranjavan Football Club (Persian: باشگاه فوتبال تهرانجوان) was an Iranian football club established in 1944 by Hossein Fekri. He is one of Persepolis F.C. former managers.
