= List of Persepolis F.C. managers =

Persepolis F.C. is a professional football club based in Tehran, Iran, which plays in the Iran Pro League. The first full-time manager of Persepolis was Parviz Dehdari in 1968. Mehdi Tartar is the current head coach of the Persepolis since 5 July 2026.

== List of managers ==
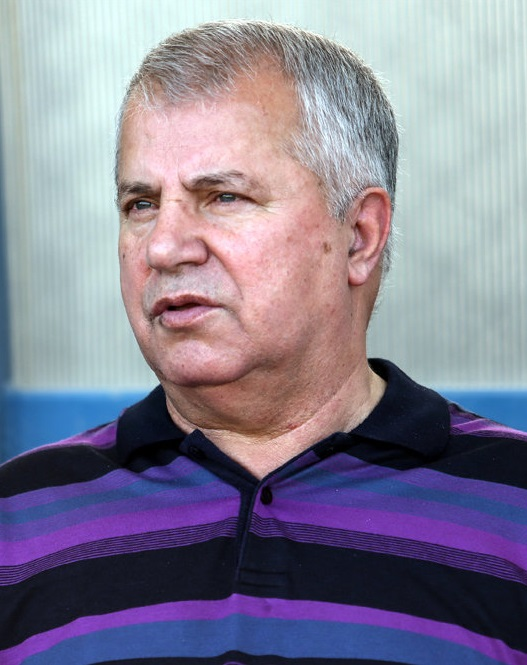
Ali Parvin won 15 trophies and is the longest-serving manager of Persepolis.

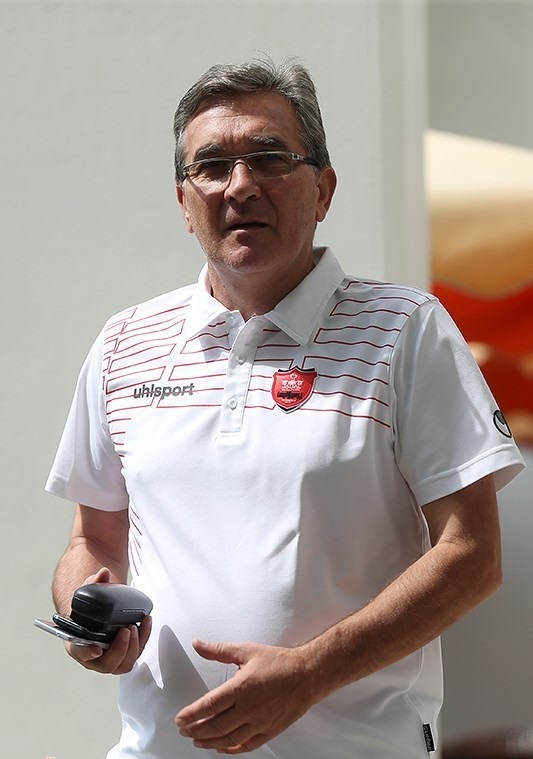
Branko Ivanković, the most successful foreign manager in terms of trophies.

From December 1963 to now, Persepolis F.C. has had thirty-one head coaches. fifteen of them were Iranian (one Iranian-American) and sixteen were from foreign countries. Seven persons served as caretaker head coach: Rajab Faramarzi in 1964-1968, Parviz Ghelichkhani in 1977, Masoud Moeini in 1988, Mahmoud Khordbin in 1993, Mohsen Ashouri in 1997 and 2011, Tomislav Ivić in 1998 and Hossein Abdi in 2015.

The most successful Persepolis F.C. manager in terms of trophies won is Ali Parvin, who won three league titles (one Iran Pro League, two Azadegan League), three Hazfi Cup trophy, six Tehran Provincial League, two Tehran Hazfi Cup and one Asian Cup Winners' Cup trophy and in total 15 trophies in his 17-year reign as manager. Branko Ivanković is the most successful foreign head coach while Manuel José de Jesus is the worst foreign head coach.

#	Name	Nat	Period			Honours	Note
#	Name	Nat	from	until	days	Honours	Note
—	Rajab Faramarzi^{⚱}	(Iran)	1967	5 April 1968	1 year, 95 days		
1	Parviz Dehdari ^{[B]}^{⚱}	(Iran)	5 April 1968	22 August 1969	1 year, 47 days	Asian Club Championship Qualification: 1969 Winner; Tehran Hazfi Cup: 1969 Runner-up; first full-time manager of club (called as a Comportment schema)	
2	Rajab Faramarzi^{⚱}	(Iran)	22 December 1969	5 March 1970	195 days		
3	Hossein Fekri ^{⚱}	(Iran)	17 July 1970	25 November 1971	1 year, 222 days	Tehran Province League: 1971 Runner-up	
4	Alan Rogers^{⚱}	(England)	25 November 1971	18 December 1974	3 years, 23 days	Iran local league: 71–72 Winner; Takht Jamshid Cup: 73–74 Winner – 74–75 Runner-up	First foreign manager (non Iranian)
5	Homayoun Behzadi ^{[A]}^{⚱}	(Iran)	6 March 1975	9 May 1975	64 days		
6	Buyuk Vatankhah ^{[A]}	(Iran)	16 May 1975	17 March 1976	306 days	Takht Jamshid Cup: 75–76 Winner	First Iranian Manager Winning Iran League
7	Ivan Kuonoev^{⚱}	(Soviet Union)	25 March 1976	3 March 1977	343 days	Takht Jamshid Cup: 76–77 Runner-up	
8	Mansour Amirasefi^{⚱}	(Iran)	11 March 1977	13 May 1977	33 days	Takht Jamshid Cup: 77–78 Runner-up	
9	Mehrab Shahrokhi ^{[A]}^{⚱}	(Iran)	30 June 1977	7 February 1982	4 years, 222 days	Shahid Espandi Cup: 1979 Winner; Tehran Hazfi Cup: 1981 Runner-up	
10	Ali Parvin ^{[A]}^{[C]}	(Iran)	12 February 1982	5 November 1993	11 years, 266 days	Asian Cup Winners' Cup: 1991 Winner – 1993 Runner-up; Azadegan League: 92–93 Runner-up; Hazfi Cup: 1988 Winner – 1992 Winner; Tehran Province League: 1983, 1987, 1988, 1989, 1990, 1991 Winners – 1982, 1984, 1992 Runners-up; Tehran Hazfi Cup: 1983, 1988 Winners	
—	Mahmoud Khordbin ^{[A]}	(Iran)	5 November 1993	16 November 1993	11 days		interim head coach
11	Mohammad Panjali ^{[A]}	(Iran)	26 November 1993	10 February 1994	76 days	Azadegan League: 93–94 Runner-up	
12	Vladislav Brajović^{⚱}	(Croatia)	10 June 1994	30 June 1994	20 days		
13	Hamid Derakhshan ^{[A]}	(Iran)	8 July 1994	20 January 1995	196 days		
14	Hans-Jürgen Gede	(Germany)	19 May 1995	15 July 1995	68 days		
15	Stanko Poklepović^{⚱}	(Croatia)	29 September 1995	4 May 1997	1 year, 217 days	Azadegan League: 95–96, 96–97 Winners	
—	Mohsen Ashouri ^{[A]}	(Iran)	4 May 1997	22 June 1997	49 days		interim head coach
(13)	Hamid Derakhshan ^{[A]}	(Iran)	22 June 1997	25 December 1997	182 days		
—	Tomislav Ivić^{⚱}	(Croatia)	29 December 1997	3 January 1998	5 days		interim head coach
16	Ivica Matković	(Croatia)	3 January 1998	2 October 1998	272 days		
(10)	Ali Parvin ^{[A]}	(Iran)	3 October 1998	22 June 2003	4 years, 262 days	Azadegan League: 98–99, 99–00 Winners – 00–01 Runner-up; Iran Pro League: 01–02 Winner; Hazfi Cup: 99 Winner	first post-Iranian Revolution manager and most successful manager in terms of trophies, The club's; longest-serving manager (totaling 18 years) and nicknamed Sultan
17	Vinko Begović	(Croatia)	29 August 2003	1 August 2004	338 days		
18	Rainer Zobel	(Germany)	14 September 2004	20 June 2005	279 days		
(10)	Ali Parvin ^{[A]}	(Iran)	26 June 2005	12 February 2006	231 days		
19	Arie Haan	(Netherlands)	16 February 2006	7 May 2006	80 days		
20	Mustafa Denizli	(Turkey)	9 September 2006	1 June 2007	326 days	Hazfi Cup: 2006 Runner-up	Nicknamed Afandi (means Lord in Turkish)
21	Afshin Ghotbi	(Iran); (United States)	16 August 2007	18 November 2008	1 year, 94 days	Iran Pro League: 07–08 Winner	Nicknamed Emperor
22	Afshin Peyrovani ^{[A]}	(Iran)	18 November 2008	6 February 2009	80 days		
23	Nelo Vingada	(Portugal)	7 February 2009	28 May 2009	110 days		
24	Zlatko Kranjčar^{⚱}	(Croatia)	21 July 2009	28 December 2009	160 days		
25	Ali Daei ^{[A]}	(Iran)	28 December 2009	22 June 2011	1 year, 176 days	Hazfi Cup: 2010, 2011 Winner	nicknamed Shahriar
26	Hamid Estili ^{[A]}	(Iran)	22 June 2011	9 December 2011	170 days		
—	Mohsen Ashouri ^{[A]}	(Iran)	10 December 2011	23 December 2011	13 days		interim head coach
(20)	Mustafa Denizli	(Turkey)	23 December 2011	23 June 2012	182 days		Nicknamed Afandi (means Lord in Turkish)
27	Manuel José	(Portugal)	3 July 2012	10 December 2012	160 days		
28	Yahya Golmohammadi ^{[A]}	(Iran)	10 December 2012	20 May 2013	161 days	Hazfi Cup: 2013 Runner-up	
(25)	Ali Daei ^{[A]}	(Iran)	20 May 2013	10 September 2014	1 year, 113 days	Persian Gulf Pro League: 2013–14 Runner-up	nicknamed Shahriar
(13)	Hamid Derakhshan ^{[A]}	(Iran)	10 September 2014	5 April 2015	207 days		
29	Branko Ivanković	(Croatia)	6 April 2015	16 June 2019	4 years, 71 days	Persian Gulf Pro League: 2016–17, 2017–18, 2018–19 Winner, 2015–16 Runner-up; Hazfi Cup: 2018–19 Winner; Iranian Super Cup: 2017, 2018, 2019 Winner; AFC Champions League: 2017 Semifinals, 2018 Runner-up	Nicknamed Professor; The most successful foreign manager in terms of trophies
30	Gabriel Calderón	(Argentina)	1 July 2019	12 January 2020	195 days		First non-European foreign manager
(28)	Yahya Golmohammadi ^{[A]}	(Iran)	13 January 2020	1 January 2024	3 years, 353 days	Persian Gulf Pro League: 2019–20, 2020–21, 2022–23 Winners, 2021–22 Runner-up Hazfi Cup: 2022–23 Winner Super Cup: 2020, 2023 Winner AFC Champions League: 2020 Runners up	
31	Osmar Loss	(Brazil)	27 January 2024	12 June 2024	137 days	Persian Gulf Pro League: 2023–24 Winners	
32	Juan Carlos Garrido	(Spain)	06 July 2024	22 December 2024	169 days		
—	Karim Bagheri ^{[A]}	(Iran)	23 December 2024	23 January 2025	31 days		interim head coach
33	İsmail Kartal	(Turkey)	24 January 2025	04 July 2025	161 days		
34	Vahid Hashemian	(Iran)	04 July 2025	26 October 2025	114 days		
(31)	Osmar Loss	(Brazil)	31 October 2025	30 June 2026	242 days		
35	Mehdi Tartar	(Iran)	05 July 2026	now	138 days		

A. ^{a} ^{b} ^{c} ^{d} ^{e} ^{f} ^{g} ^{h} ^{i} ^{j} ^{k} ^{l} ^{m} ^{n} Formerly played for the club

B. Club's first full-time manager

C. Most honours won and longest-serving manager in club history

^{⚱} Died

== Statistics ==
Last updated on 20 November 2026

Only official matches included (Iranian Football League, Hazfi Cup, Iranian Super Cup, AFC Champions League or Asian Cup Winners' Cup matches).

Name	Nat	GP	W	D	L	GF	GA	W%
Ali Parvin	(Iran)	467	291	128	48	834	30	62.3
Yahya Golmohammadi	(Iran)	179	107	51	21	281	119	59.8
Branko Ivanković	(Croatia)	175	98	49	28	249	126	56.0
Ali Daei	(Iran)	104	54	25	25	143	95	51.9
Alan Rogers	(England)	96	56	11	29	175	63	58.3
Mehrab Shahrokhi	(Iran)	90	54	8	28	174	71	60.0
Hamid Derakhshan	(Iran)	62	25	17	20	129	90	44.2
Mustafa Denizli	(Turkey)	56	22	21	13	129	68	39.2
Stanko Poklepović	(Croatia)	54	31	8	15	82	38	57.4
Afshin Ghotbi	(Iran) (United States)	51	26	15	10	88	61	50.9
Hossein Fekri	(Iran)	45	25	9	11	104	39	55.5
Osmar Loss	(Brazil)	32	20	5	7	50	28	62.5
Rainer Zobel	(Germany)	31	16	7	8	43	28	51.6
Ivan Kuonoev	(Soviet Union)	30	11	4	15	33	27	36.6
Vinko Begović	(Croatia)	28	10	9	9	44	32	35.7
Buyuk Vatankhah	(Iran)	27	12	2	13	25	10	44.4
Parviz Dehdari	(Iran)	25	15	4	6	50	20	60.0
Hans-Jürgen Gede	(Germany)	22	6	10	6	21	20	27.2
Zlatko Kranjčar	(Croatia)	21	8	9	4	31	24	38.0
Juan Carlos Garrido	(Spain)	20	9	5	6	23	16	45.0
Gabriel Calderón	(Argentina)	19	14	1	4	24	7	73.7
Hamid Estili	(Iran)	18	7	5	6	23	23	38.8
Nelo Vingada	(Portugal)	17	8	4	5	19	19	47.0
Manuel José	(Portugal)	17	5	6	6	20	17	29.4
İsmail Kartal	(Turkey)	16	8	4	4	21	16	50.0
Homayoun Behzadi	(Iran)	15	7	4	4	23	14	46.6
Mehdi Tartar	(Iran)	13	8	2	3	23	7	61.5
Ivica Matković	(Croatia)	13	7	2	4	21	16	53.8
Mohammad Panjali	(Iran)	13	5	6	2	18	11	38.4
Rajab Faramarzi	(Iran)	13	4	1	8	16	20	30.7
Afshin Peyrovani	(Iran)	12	7	3	2	20	14	58.3
Arie Haan	(Netherlands)	12	4	5	3	19	17	33.3
Mansour Amirasefi	(Iran)	9	3	2	4	9	10	33.3
Vahid Hashemian	(Iran)	8	2	5	1	7	5	25.0
Mahmoud Khordbin	(Iran)	7	4	1	2	11	4	57.1
Karim Bagheri	(Iran)	6	3	2	1	10	3	50.0
Vladislav Brajevic	(Croatia)	5	3	1	1	8	3	60.0
Mohammad Mayeli Kohan	(Iran)	5	1	2	2	7	6	20.0
Nasser Mohammadkhani	(Iran)	4	1	2	1	3	3	25.0
Mohsen Ashouri	(Iran)	3	1	2	0	5	4	35.0
Parviz Ghelichkhani	(Iran)	3	1	1	1	2	1	33.3
Masoud Moeini	(Iran)	2	1	1	0	6	2	50.0
Reza Vatankhah	(Iran)	1	1	0	0	6	3	100
Valiollah Salehnia	(Iran)	1	1	0	0	1	0	100
Gholamreza Fathabadi	(Iran)	1	1	0	0	1	0	100
Hossein Abdi	(Iran)	1	1	0	0	1	0	100
Andrej Panadić	(Croatia)	1	0	1	0	1	1	0
Nasser Ebrahimi	(Iran)	1	0	0	1	0	3	0

Managers
since 2000
Managers
since 1964

== Longest-serving managers ==
Manager	Nationality	Time as manager
Ali Parvin	Iran	17 years, 30 days
Mehrab Shahrokhi	Iran	4 years, 222 days
Yahya Golmohammadi	Iran	4 years, 149 days
Branko Ivanković	Croatia	4 years, 71 days
Alan Rogers	England	3 years, 23 days

== Notable managers ==
Name	Period	Trophies					
Name	Period	Domestic				International	
Name	Period	League	Cup	Super Cup	Other	ACWC	ACL
(Iran) Ali Parvin	1982–93; 1998–03; 2005–06	3	3	0	8 (Note: 6 Tehran Province league Cup and 2 Tehran Hazfi Cup)	1	0
(Croatia) Branko Ivanković	2015–19	3	1	3	0	0	0
(Iran) Yahya Golmohammadi	2012–13; 2020–2024	3	1	2	0	0	0
(England) Alan Rogers	1971–76	2	0	0	0	0	0
(Croatia) Stanko Poklepović	1995–97	2	0	0	0	0	0
(Iran) Ali Daei	2009–11; 2013–14	0	2	0	0	0	0
(Iran) Buyuk Vatankhah	1976	1	0	0	0	0	0
(Iran) Afshin Ghotbi	2007–08	1	0	0	0	0	0
(Brazil) Osmar Loss	2024; 2025–26	1	0	0	0	0	0
(Iran) Mehrab Shahrokhi	1977–82	0	0	0	2 (Note: 1 Espandi Cup and 1 Tehran Hazfi Cup)	0	0

== By nationality ==
Country	Managers
Iran	28
Croatia	7
Portugal	2
Germany	2
Turkey	2
Argentina	1
Brazil	1
England	1
Netherlands	1
Soviet Union	1
Spain	1

== See also ==
Persepolis F.C.
