= Persepolis F.C. Honours =

Persepolis F.C. (Persian: پرسپولیس) is an Iranian professional football club based in Tehran. Although Persepolis Athletic and Cultural Club was founded in 1963, Persepolis F.C. started in 1968 following dissolution of Shahin F.C. in 1967. Parviz Dehdari and Masoud Boroumand transferred the popularity of Shahin to Persepolis F.C. by taking most Shahin Players to join Persepolis.

The club has won a total of 28 trophies at the national level, comprising the Iranian Top-tier Football Leagues a record of 16 times, Hazfi Cup 7 times and recently developed tournament, Iranian Super Cup, a record of 5 times and also won the 1979 Espandi Cup. It has also won 11 regional trophies, which are the Tehran Provincial League 7 times, and Tehran Hazfi Cup a record of 4 times. In the continental level, Persepolis F.C. has won 1 title of Asian Cup Winners' Cup and participated three other continental finals in both Asian Cup Winners' Cup in 1992–93 and AFC Champions League in 2018 and 2020.

This list details the club's achievements.

== National titles ==
- Iranian Football League (Record)

Winners (16) : 1971–72, 1973–74, 1975–76, 1995–96, 1996–97, 1998–99 *, 1999–2000, 2001–02, 2007–08, 2016–17, 2017–18, 2018–19 *, 2019–20, 2020–21, 2022–23 *, 2023–24
Runners-up (9): 1974–75, 1976–77, 1977–78, 1989–90, 1992–93, 1993–94, 2000–01, 2013–14, 2015–16
(* Won League title and Hazfi Cup)

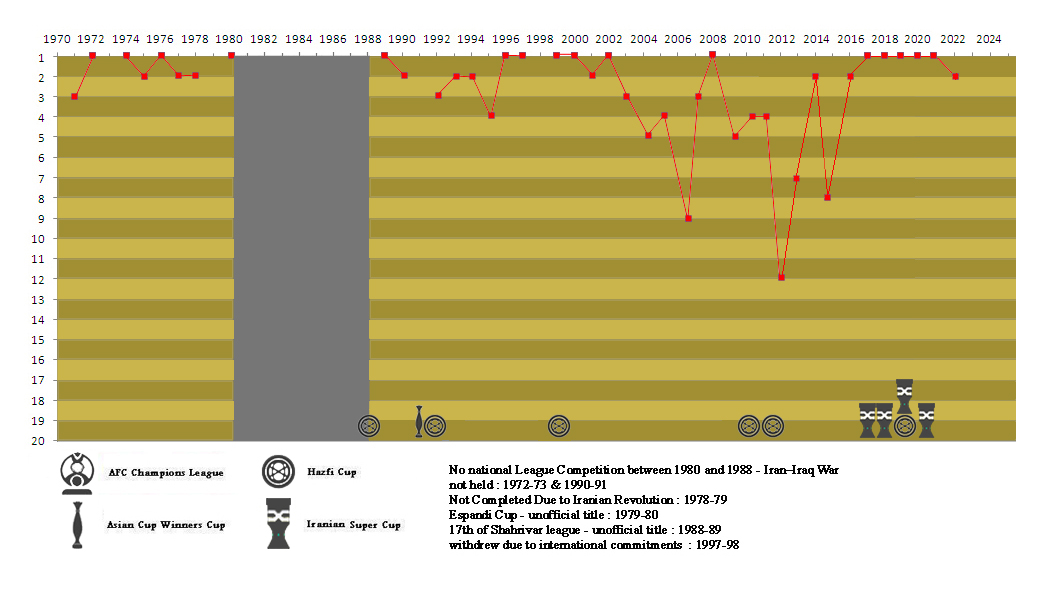
The Persepolis's positions

- Hazfi Cup (Shared record)

Winners (7): 1987–88, 1990–91, 1998–99 *, 2009–10, 2010–11, 2018–19 *,2022–23 *
Runners-up (2): 2005–06, 2012–13
(* Won League title and Hazfi Cup)

- Super Cup (Record)

Winners (5): 2017, 2018, 2019 *, 2020, 2023 *
Runners-up (2): 2021, 2024
(*Won domestic treble)

- Espandi Cup (Record)

Winners (1): 1979

== Provincial titles ==
- Tehran Province League

Winners (7): 1982–83, 1986–87 ^{♦}, 1987–88, 1988–89, 1989–90, 1990–91, 2011–12^{♦}
Runner-up (4): 1970–71, 1981–82, 1983–84, 1991–92
(* Won League title and Hazfi Cup)

- Tehran Hazfi Cup

Winners (4): 1978–79, 1981–82, 1986–87^{♦}, 2011–12^{♦}
Runners-up (2): 1968–69, 1980–81
(* Won League title and Hazfi Cup)

== Continental titles ==
- AFC Champions League:

Runners-up (2): 2018, 2020

- Asian Club Championship:

Third place (3): 1996–97, 1999–00, 2000–01
Fourth place (1): 1997–98

- Asian Cup Winners' Cup:(Iran record)

Winner (1): 1990–91
Runners-up (1): 1992–93

== Other awards ==
- IFFHS continental clubs of the 20th century

4th Place

- Iranian Team of the year

2007–08
2016–17
2017–18
2018–19

- Best Fan Club

2012–13

- Fair play award

2018 AFC Champions League
