= Camelia Fallah =

Iranian footballer

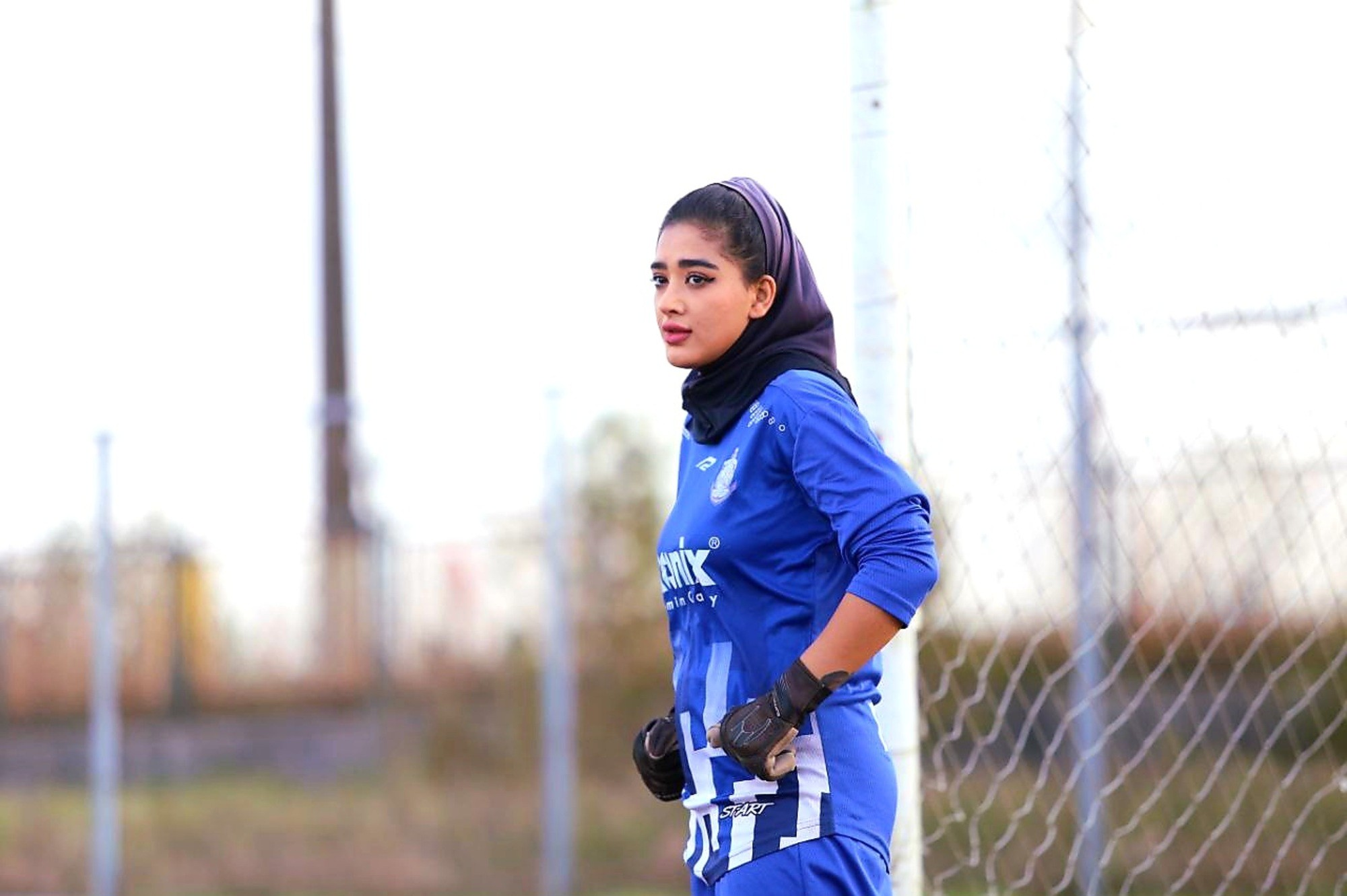
- Camelia playing for Malavan (Women) in 2024

Personal information
- Full name: Camelia (Zahra) Fallah
- Date of birth: 3 January 2002 (age 24)
- Place of birth: Tehran, Iran
- Height: 1.73 m (5 ft 8 in)
- Position: Goalkeeper

Team information
- Current team: Malavan (Women)
- Number: 81

Senior career*
Years	Team	Apps	(Gls)
2020–2021	Afraz Tehran	13	(0)
2021–2022	Tam Isfahan	14	(0)
2022	Sargol	0	(0)
2022–2023	Malavan (Women)	13	(0)

International career
2019–	Iran	1	(0)
- * Club domestic league appearances and goals

Camelia Fallah (Persian: کاملیا فلاح; born 3 January 2003), known as Camelia, is an Iranian professional footballer who plays as a goalkeeper for the Kowsar Women Football League club Malavan and the Iran women's national team.

Camelia has been mentioned as one of the skilled Iranian female goalkeepers. However, she has never played for Iran more than once.

== Early and personal life ==
Camelia Fallah, born on 3 January 2002 in Tehran, has been involved in football since the early teenage years and she was also student of language translation at the Azad University, North Tehran. She started sports first with Taekwondo and then entered football. During 8 years in Taekwondo, She was able to win domestic honors, including the Tehran provincial league, and was also called to the national team.

She has also worked as a model for Iranian healthcare companies.

She also is a Persepolis supporter.

== Club career ==
=== Malavan ===
Camelia joined Kowsar league side Malavan F.C. in 2022.

== International career ==
=== Iran ===
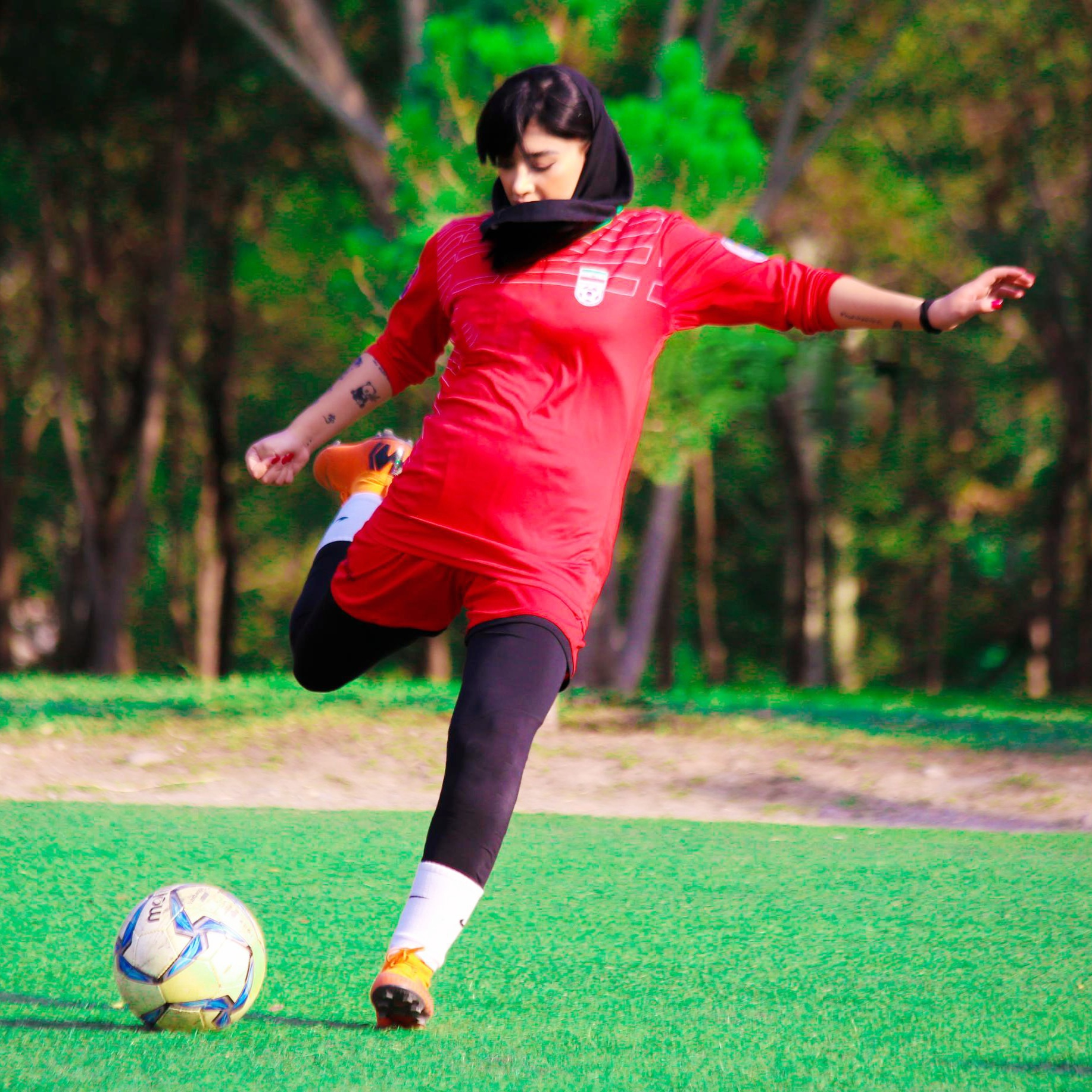
Cameia with Iran

== Style of play ==
Movements with the legs while goalkeeping and sending accurate passes are the features of her style of play.
