= Mohammad Mayeli Kohan =

Iranian footballer

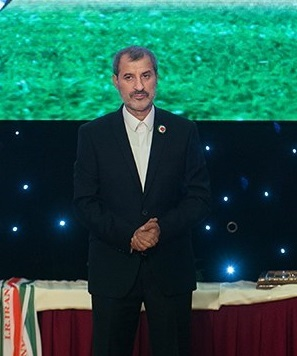
- Mohammad Mayeli Kohan in 2016

Personal information
- Full name: Mohammad Mayeli Kohan
- Date of birth: 5 June 1954 (age 72)
- Place of birth: Bandar-e Anzali, Iran
- Height: 1.69 m (5 ft 6 1/2 in)
- Position: Midfielder

Youth career
- 1969–1974: Ghasre Yakh

Senior career*
Years	Team	Apps	(Gls)
1974–1976	Naft Tehran	100	(30)
1976–1990	Persepolis	60	(10)

International career
1978–1982	Iran	10	(0)

Managerial career
- 1990–1992: Persepolis (assistant)
- 1991–1992: Iran (assistant)
- 1992–1995: Iran Futsal
- 1995–1997: Iran
- 2003: Iran U23
- 2003–2004: Saipa
- 2004: Paykan
- 2006–2007: Foolad
- 2008–2011: Saipa
- 2012–2013: Gahar Zagros
- 2013: Saba Qom
- 2016–2017: Malavan
Medal record
Men's football
Representing Iran (as manager)
AFC Asian Cup
Bronze medal – third place	1996
- * Club domestic league appearances and goals

Mohammad Mayeli Kohan (Persian: محمد مایلی‌کهن; born 5 June 1954) is an Iranian football coach and former player. He recently managed Malavan in Azadegan League.

== Early life ==
He was born on 5 June 1954 in Bandar-e Anzali in Iran. His father was a farmer. He has two brothers and one sister.

== Playing career ==
He moved to Tehran in 1967 and joined Ghasre Yakh Club in 1969. He played there until 1974. From 1974 to 1976 he played at Naft Tehran. Mayeli Kohan joined Persepolis in 1976. His best time was in Perspolis. He retired as a player in 1990. He played for Iran national football team 6 times.

== Coaching career ==
=== Assistantship ===
He was chosen as assistant manager of Perspeolis just months after his retirement in 1990 and became assistant manager of Iran national football team in 1991 by Ali Parvin.

=== Iran futsal ===
In 1992, he became head coach of Iran national futsal team and was in team's charge until 1995. Iran national futsal team became in Fourth place at 1992 FIFA Futsal World Cup with Mayeli Kohan.

=== Iran football ===
After good results with national futsal team, he was appointed as manager of Iran national football team after Stanko Poklepović's resignation. He coached team in 1996 AFC Asian Cup and was ranked in third place. He invited players such as Farhad Majidi, Khodadad Azizi and Ali Daei to the national team which team became Iran's best players in next years.

=== Iran Under-23 ===
In 2003, Football Federation Islamic Republic of Iran appointed Mayeli Kohan as the head coach of Iran national under-23 football team. He resigned two months later to become the head coach of Iran Pro League side Saipa.

=== Saipa ===
He became head coach of Saipa in July 2003 replacing Giovanni Mei. He was head coach until the end of season which lead team in 13th ranked and team was relegated to the Azadegan League and Mayeli Kohan was sacked by the club.

=== Paykan ===
After his poor showing with Saipa, he was appointed as the head coach of Paykan in 2004. He had an unsuccessful stint with Paykan and resigned shortly after.

=== Foolad ===
He took a hiatus from coaching for two years but returned to manage Foolad in 2006. Foolad were relegated to Azadegan League a sharp decline from their previous season's 8th place finish. He was fired two days after the end of season.

=== Returning to Saipa ===
He was returned to Saipa in 2008 after Ali Daei became head coach of Iran national football team. During 2008–09 season, he received good results with Saipa and ended the season in 10th rank, finishing bad years of coaching. He was reappointed for two years by club chairman in 2009.Saipa F.C.'s last minute goal against Esteghlal F.C. in a game held in April 2009, threatened Esteghlal's chance of winning the Iranian title. After the game, because of fan clashes between the two teams and fan insults towards Mayeli Kohan and his family, Mayeli Kohan sent a letter to Esteghlal manager Amir Ghalenoei which reportedly included harsh references to Ghalenoei's height, facial appearance and background. When he was appointed as head coach of Iran national football team in 2009, he wasn't resigned as his position in Saipa and after he was refuse to coaching national team, he came back to Saipa. He was end 2009–10 season in 8th rank and 2010–11 season in 11th rank and was resigned as head coach of Saipa in the last match which they won and wasn't relegated to Azadegan League. After one of Saipa's games, when one of the reporters asked him about his great winning streak with Saipa 4 games in a row, Mayelikohan started to cry and couldn't give the reporter any answer

=== Appointment as Iran national team coach for second time ===
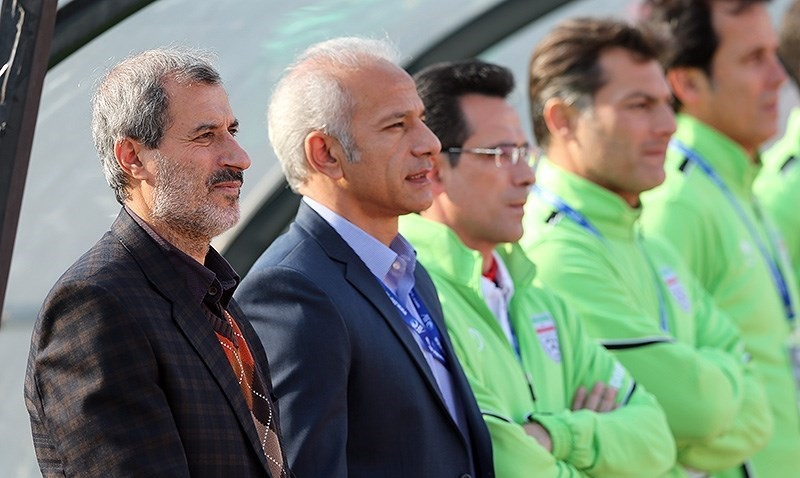
Mayeli Kohan as technical manager with Iran U-23 team

He was assigned as the new coach of Iran National football team on 7 April 2009 replacing Ali Daei who had been sacked a week earlier and was released on 21 April 2009.

As a result of conflicts with Amir Ghalenoei, an angered Ghalenoei, along several other Esteghlal players and officials including Fabio Januario, Farhad Majidi and Arash Borhani, stormed the IRIFF headquarters demanding an action to be made against Mayeli Kohan. Several days later Mayeli Kohan resigned without coaching Iran in any match.

=== Technical Manager of Persepolis ===
He was appointed as Technical Manager of Persepolis by Habib Kashani on 6 July 2011. He was resigned on 20 August 2011 after his deference with head coach.

=== Gahar Zagros ===
On 27 August 2012, Mayeli Kohan was appointed as head coach of Gahar Zagros, replacing with Mehdi Tartar who resigned last month. He returned to management after nearly two years. His side was relegated to the Azadegan League, just one year after their promotion. He left the team at the end of the season.

=== Saba Qom ===
On 30 May 2013, he signed a one-year contract with Saba Qom. His first match as head coach of Saba was a 1–0 win over Malavan.

=== Malavan ===
He was appointed as manager of Malavan on 21 July 2016.

=== Statistics ===
As of 17 April 2017

Team	From	To	Record				
Team	From	To	G	W	D	L	Win %
Iran	26 April 1996	7 November 1997	40	24	10	6	60.00
Saipa	1 August 2003	1 August 2004	26	3	12	11	11.54
Iran U-23	3 May 2003	12 May 2004	8	5	0	3	62.50
Saipa	6 December 2008	21 May 2011	75	30	35	10	40.00
Gahar Zagros	27 October 2012	11 May 2013	23	3	5	15	13.04
Saba Qom	1 June 2013	11 November 2013	16	4	4	8	25.00
Malavan	21 July 2016	27 May 2017	34	16	11	7	47.06
Total			219	84	75	57	38.36

== Personal life ==
On 3 January 2026, in an interview with Iran International, Mayeli Kohan appealed to Iranian athletes to support the 2025–2026 Iranian protests, saying: "Whatever athletes have, they have from the people.". On 9 February 2026, he publicly objected to being included on a list of supporters of the 1979 Islamic Revolution by the Ministry of Sport and Youth, ahead of the Revolution's anniversary.

== Honours ==
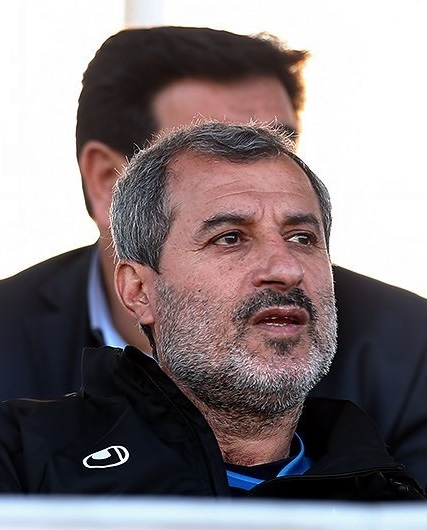
Mayeli Kohan in Iran national under-23 football team training in 2015

=== Player ===
Persepolis

- Iranian Football League: 1975–76, 1976–77 (runner-up), 1977–78 (runner-up), 1989–90 (runner-up)
- Hazfi Cup: 1987–88
- Espandi Cup: 1979
- Tehran Football League: 1982, 1986, 1987, 1988, 1989, 1990

=== Manager ===
Iran Futsal

- FIFA Futsal World Cup: 1992 (fourth place)

Iran

- AFC Asian Cup: 1996 (bronze medal)

== Electoral history ==
Year	Election	Votes	%	Rank	Notes
2008	Parliament	95,878	5.50	67th	Lost
