= Moeini =

Moeini is an Iranian surname. Notable people with the surname include:

- Effat Moridi (1929–2013), also known as Mother Moeini, Iranian activist
- Fereydoun Moeini (born 1946), Iranian footballer
- Masoud Moeini (born 1949), Iranian footballer
- Mohsen Moeini (born 1979), Iranian author and director
- Mohammed Al-Moeini (born 1986), Emirati footballer
- Rahim Moeini Kermanshahi (1923–2015), Iranian poet
