= Parviz Ghelichkhani =

Iranian footballer (1945–2026)

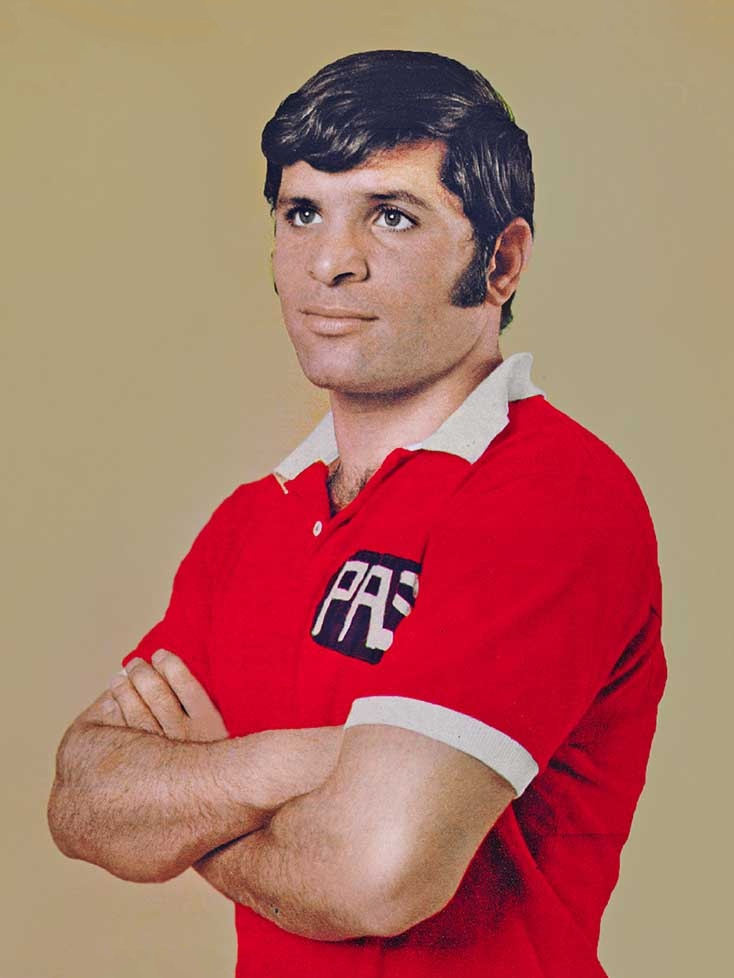
- Ghelichkhani in 1971

Personal information
- Date of birth: 4 December 1945
- Place of birth: Tehran, Iran
- Date of death: 23 May 2026 (aged 80)
- Place of death: Paris, France
- Height: 1.73 m (5 ft 8 in)
- Position: Midfielder

Youth career
- Adeeb
- Alborz

Senior career*
Years	Team	Apps	(Gls)
1962–1968	Kian		
1968–1971	Taj		
1971–1972	Pas		
1972–1974	Oghab		
1974–1976	Daraei		
1976–1977	Persepolis		
1978	San Jose Earthquakes	16	

International career
1964–1977	Iran	66	(14)
Medal record
Representing Iran
AFC Asian Cup
Winner	1968
Winner	1972
Winner	1976
Asian Games
Gold medal – first place	1974
- * Club domestic league appearances and goals

Parviz Ghelichkhani (Persian: پرویز قلیچ‌خانی, 4 December 1945 – 23 May 2026) was an Iranian-French football player and captain of Iran national team. He was one of the Best Players of All Time in Iran and Asia. One of the most important members of the Iran national team in the championship of the Asian Nations Cup in 1968 and 1972 and 1976 and Asian Games 1974 and member of Taj (Esteghlal Tehran) club in the championship of the AFC Champions League in 1970. He is generally considered the best player in Asia in the 1970s. Along with Ali Jabbari, he was the leader and star of Iran's Golden Generation in the late 1960s and early 1970s.

Later in his life Ghelichkhani was based in France, where he was the editor and publisher of a political magazine.

== Club career ==
Ghelichkhani played for Alborz F.C. (Kian's reserve team), Kian, Taj, Pas F.C., Oghab F.C., Daraei F.C. and finally Persepolis, before leaving for the United States where he played for the San Jose Earthquakes in the North American Soccer League.

He won many national titles, among them the Iranian league in 1971; he also achieved the runners-up position with Persepolis in 1977. In 1970, he won the Asian Club Championship with Taj. During various stages of his career, he had offers from German, Greek and Turkish football clubs but declined all of them.

For the 1978 season, Ghelichkhani moved to the United States to play for the San Jose Earthquakes, then part of the North American Soccer League. During this time, Ghelichkhani retained his number 5 jersey and was credited only by his first name.

== International career ==
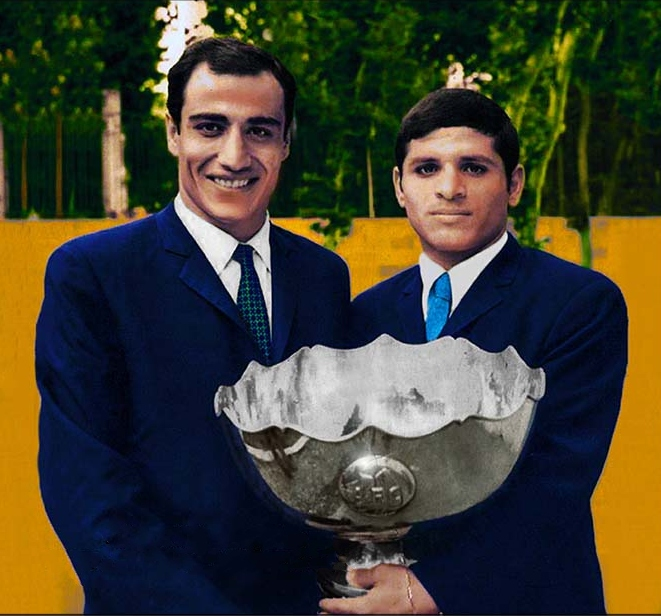
Jalal Talebi and Ghelichkhani with the 1968 AFC Asian Cup

Ghelichkhani made his debut for the Iranian national team in the 1964 Summer Olympics match against East Germany. Aged 17, Ghelichkhani was the youngest Iranian player at those Games. Later he was Iran's captain at the 1972 and 1976 Summer Olympics.

He won the Asian Nations Cup three consecutive times with Iran, in 1968 (where he scored the 2–1 victory goal), in 1972, and in 1976, when he captained the team. In 1966 he won the silver medal of the Asian Games in Thailand, in 1974 he captained the Iranian team to win the football tournament of the Asian Games in Tehran.

His last game for Iran was a friendly match against Hungary in March 1977. He scored 12 goals for Iran and has 64 caps for Team Melli. One of his most memorable goals was in a 1974 World Cup qualification match against Australia, in a 2–0 win in Tehran.

== Style of play ==
Ghelichkhani played as a defensive midfielder. He was known for his playmaking, shooting, tackling, stamina, and leadership.

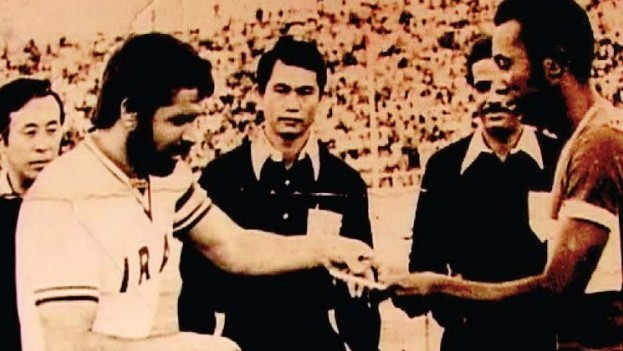
Ghelichkhani with Pakistan national team captain Abdul Ghafoor (right) during the 1974 Asian Games

== Political career ==
Ghelichkhani was also politically involved and had leftist leanings. He was arrested by SAVAK in February 1972, but was released after two months. He was opposed to both the Pahlavi regime and the Mollah system that was put in place after the Iranian revolution. He missed out on World Cup 1978 because of his opposition to the regime.

Due to his political activities before and after the revolution, he eventually left the country to live in Paris, France.

Between 1991 and 2014, Ghelichkhani was the editor of Arash, a political and cultural commentary magazine concentrating mainly on Iranian issues, which was published in France.

He was honored in December 2007 in Sydney, in celebration of the 100th edition of Arash magazine, in a ceremony where Ralé Rašić was a guest speaker. Rašić was Australia's coach when Australia faced Iran twice during the 1974 World Cup qualification games.

== Death ==
Ghelichkhani died in Paris on 23 May 2026, at the age of 80.

== Career statistics ==
Scores and results list Iran's goal tally first, score column indicates score after each Ghelichkhani goal.

List of international goals scored by Parviz Ghelichkhani
No.	Date	Venue	Opponent	Score	Result	Competition
1	19 May 1968	Amjadieh Stadium, Tehran, Iran	Israel		2–1	1968 AFC Asian Cup
2	7 March 1969	Amjadieh Stadium, Tehran, Iran	Iraq		2–1	1969 Friendship Cup
3	10 March 1969	Amjadieh Stadium, Tehran, Iran	Pakistan		9–1	1969 Friendship Cup
4	1 September 1970	Amjadieh Stadium, Tehran, Iran	Pakistan		7–0	1970 RCD Cup
5	17 May 1972	National Stadium, Bangkok, Thailand	Khmer Republic		2–1	1972 Asian Cup
6	11 June 1972	Estádio do Arruda, Recife, Brazil	Republic of Ireland		1–2	Brazil Independence Cup
7	21 June 1972	Estádio do Arruda, Recife, Brazil	Ecuador		1–1	Brazil Independence Cup
8	13 May 1973	Amjadieh Stadium, Tehran, Iran	Kuwait		2–0	1974 FIFA World Cup qualification
9	24 August 1973	Aryamehr Stadium, Tehran, Iran	Australia		2–0	1974 FIFA World Cup qualification
10	24 August 1973	Aryamehr Stadium, Tehran, Iran	Australia		2–0	1974 FIFA World Cup qualification
11	3 September 1974	Aryamehr Stadium, Tehran, Iran	Pakistan		7–0	1974 Asian Games
12	7 September 1974	Aryamehr Stadium, Tehran, Iran	Bahrain		6–0	1974 Asian Games
13	2 July 1976	Aryamehr Stadium, Tehran, Iran	Romania		2–2	Friendly
14	25 July 1976	Municipal Stadium, Sherbrooke, Canada	Soviet Union		1–2	1976 Olympic Games – Quarter Finals

== Honours ==
Taj/Esteghlal

- Iran Football League: 1971
- Tehran Football League: 1971
- AFC Champions League: 1970

Iran

- AFC Asian Cup: 1968, 1972, 1976
- Asian Games: 1974

Individual

- Iran Footballer of the Year: 1966, 1973
- Asian Team of The Year: 1967
- Record: The only player in the History of the Asian Nation Cup to win three titles (1968,1972,1976)
