= Hatam =

Hatam may refer to:

- Hatam language, a language of West Papua
- Khalifeh Kandi, Hashtrud, also known as Hātam, a village in Iran
- Iraj Hatam, Iranian football player

== See also ==
- Khatam
