= Jalal Talebi =

Iranian footballer

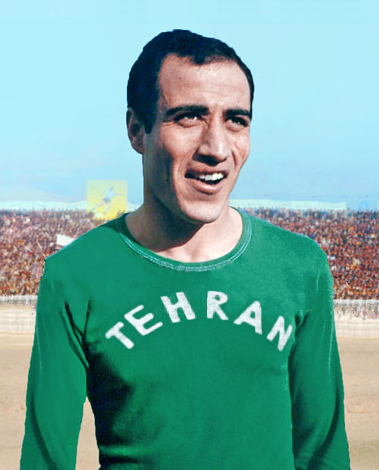
- Talebi in 1960s

Personal information
- Full name: Seyed Jalal Talebi
- Date of birth: 23 March 1942 (age 84)
- Place of birth: Tehran, Iran
- Height: 1.86 m (6 ft 1 in)
- Position: Midfielder

Senior career*
Years	Team	Apps	(Gls)
1960–1964	Daraei		
1964–1971	Taj		

International career
1964–1971	Iran	15	(1)

Managerial career
- 1973–1976: Daraei
- 1976–1978: Iran U20
- 1980–1986: Al-Khaleej
- 1996–1997: Geylang United
- 1997: Indonesia (olympic)
- 1998: Iran
- 2000–2001: Iran
- 2001–2002: Syria
- 2005–2006: Al Taliya
- * Club domestic league appearances and goals

Seyed Jalal Talebi (Persian: جلال طالبی; born 23 March 1942) is a retired Iranian football player and manager.

== Playing career ==
Talebi had a very short playing career in which he played for Daraei, Taj (Esteghlal) and the Iran national football team, for which he played three matches at the 1964 Summer Olympics, and won the 1968 AFC Asian Cup. He was known for his heads up plays, his jumping abilities and his skills with the ball. A meniscus injury ended his playing career aged 27.

=== International goals ===
#	Date	Venue	Opponent	Score	Result	Competition
1.	13 December 1966	Chulalongkorn University Stadium, Bangkok, Thailand	India	4–1	W	1966 Asian Games
Correct as of 24 July 2021

== Managerial career ==
Talebi attended Chelsea coaching school in England for several months between 1971 and 1973. He coached the Iran national under-20 football team from 1976 to 1978.

Talebi had coached soccer at De Anza Community College. He was the head coach of the Iranian national team during the 1998 FIFA World Cup, during which he had a deeply emotional encounter against the United States due to his role as an Iranian-American exile in the United States. Prior to the tournament, he was appointed to replace Tomislav Ivic. He had held the position of technical director before he was named as head coach. He stepped down as head coach after the 1998 FIFA World Cup on 20 August 1998, but returned to lead the team again during 2000 Asian Cup in Lebanon. He resigned after Iran's elimination in the tournament.

Talebi has also managed Geylang United of S.League in 1996, Indonesian Olympic Team from 1996 to 1997, Syria national football team from 2001 to 2002, and Al Taliya from 2005 to 2006.

=== Coaching career statistics ===
Nat	Team	From	To	Record							
Nat	Team	From	To	G	W	D	L	Win %	GF	GA	+/-
(Iran)	Iran	May 1998	August 1998	4	1	0	3	25%	2	6	−4
(Iran)	Iran	March 2000	October 2001	20	13	5	3	65%	39	15	+24
(Syria)	Syria	November 2001	September 2002	10	9	0	1	90%	11	3	+8
Total				34	23	5	4	70%	52	24	+28

== Personal life ==
Talebi lives in Palo Alto, California, with his wife and three sons. He moved to the United States in 1983, where he was naturalised as an American citizen.

== Honours ==
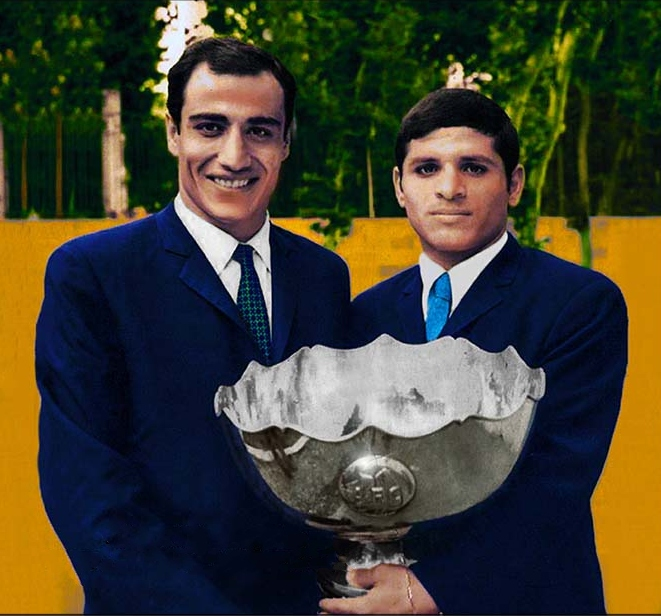
Jalal Talebi and Parviz Ghelichkhani with the 1968 AFC Asian Cup

=== Player ===
Daraei

- Tehran Championship (1): 1961

Taj

- Iranian League (1): 1970–71
- Tehran Championship (1): 1970, 1971
- Asian Club Championship (1): 1970

Iran

- Winner of AFC Asian Cup1968

=== Manager ===
Geylang United

- S.League (1): 1996
- Singapore FA Cup (1): 1996

Iran

- West Asian Football Federation Championship (1): 2000

Sporting positions
Preceded by Tomislav Ivić	Iran national football team Manager; 1998	Succeeded by Mansour Pourheidari
Preceded by Mansour Pourheidari	Iran national football team Manager; 2000–2001	Succeeded by Ademar Braga
