= Etka Gorgan F.C. =

Etka Gorgan اتكا گرگان
- Full name: Etka Gorgan Football Club
- Nickname: The Blues (Persian: آبی پوشان)
- Founded: 2008; 17 years ago
- Ground: Karim Abad Stadium; Gorgan
- Capacity: 15,000
- League: Golestan Province League
- 2015-16: 3rd Division Group 1, 10th (Relegated)
Home colours	Away colours

Etka Gorgan (Persian: اتكا گرگان) was an Iranian football club based in Gorgan, Iran.

== History ==
Etka Gorgan was founded in 2008 and was placed in the Azadegan League. Etka had several mid table finishes until the 2012-2013 season, where they finished 11th and were relegated to the 2nd Division. Etka only played in the 2nd Division for one year as they were immediately promoted back to the Azadegan League. The club faced financial problems and dropped out of the Azadegan League in 2015.

== Season-by-season ==
The table below chronicles the achievements of Etka Gorgan in various competitions since 2008.

Season	League	Position	Hazfi Cup
2008–09	Azadegan League	10th	Did not qualify
2009–10	Azadegan League	5th	1/16 Final
2010–11	Azadegan League	6th	3rd Round
2011–12	Azadegan League	7th	1/16 Final
2012–13	Azadegan League	11th	Did not qualify
2013–14	2nd Division	1st	Disqualified
2014–15	Azadegan League	12th	Withdrew
2015–16	3rd Division	10th	Withdrew

== Club managers ==
- (Iran) Ali Nikhbakht (July 2008-Nov 08)
- (Iran) Saket Elhami (Nov 2008-Jan 09)
- (Iran) Hadi Bargizar (Jan 2009-July 10)
- (Iran) Hossein Ghezelsafloo (July 2010-?)
- (Iran) Hamid Kolalifard (2011-2012)
- (Iran) Saket Elhami (2012-Nov 12)
- (Iran) Hamid Kolalifard (Nov 2012-)

== Famous players ==
- (Iran) Sardar Azmoun (youth teams)
