= Mohammad Panjali =

Iranian footballer (born 1955)

Mohammad Panjali محمد پنجعلی
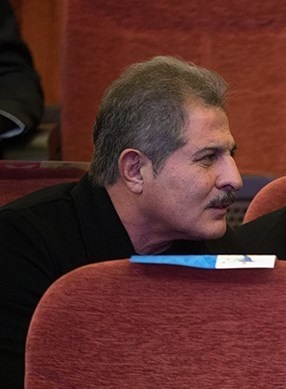

Personal information
- Full name: Seyed Mohammad Panjali Qomi
- Date of birth: July 26, 1955 (age 71)
- Place of birth: Tehran, Imperial State of Iran
- Height: 1.70 m (5 ft 7 in)
- Position: Defender

Youth career
- 1972–1975: Bargh Tehran

Senior career*
| Years | Team | Apps | (Gls) |
| 1974–1975 | Bargh Tehran | | |
| 1975–1976 | Fath Tehran | | |
| 1976–1977 | Aboomoslem | | |
| 1977–1987 | Persepolis | | |
| 1987–1989 | Al-Gharafa | | |
| 1989–1994 | Persepolis | | |

International career
| 1978–1991 | Iran | 45 | (0) |

Managerial career
- 1991–1993: Persepolis (Assistant)
- 1993–1994: Persepolis
- * Club domestic league appearances and goals

Seyed Mohammad Panjali Qomi (Persian: سید محمد پنجعلی قمی; born July 26, 1955, in Tehran, Iran) is a retired Iranian footballer and a football coach. He played for Bargh Tehran, Fath Tehran, Aboomoslem, Persepolis FC, Al-Gharafa and the Iran national football team, where he made 45 appearances. He usually played in the defender position. He was also team manager of Persepolis from 1993 until 1994.

== Honours ==
=== Club ===
Persepolis

- Espandi Cup: 1979
- Asian Cup Winners' Cup (1): 1990–91
  - Runner-up: 1992–93
- Hazfi Cup (1): 1991–92
- Tehran Provincial League (4): 1982-83, 1986–87, 1989–90, 1990-91

=== Country ===
Iran

- Asian Games Gold Medal (1): 1990
