= United States v Iran (1998 FIFA World Cup) =

Association football match

1998 FIFA World Cup Group F
- Event: 1998 FIFA World Cup Group F
United States	Iran
(United States)	(Iran)
1	2
- Date: 21 June 1998
- Venue: Stade de Gerland, Lyon
- Referee: Urs Meier (Switzerland)
- Attendance: 39,100

United States v Iran, played on 21 June 1998, was a football match between Iran and the United States in the group stage of the 1998 FIFA World Cup at the Stade de Gerland in Lyon, France. The match, which is described as the "mother of all games" and the "most politically charged game in World Cup history," ended with a 2–1 victory for Iran, the team's first ever victory in the history of the FIFA World Cup. Hamid Estili and Mehdi Mahdavikia scored for Iran, while Brian McBride scored for the United States.

The match was played against a backdrop of political tension between the United States and Iran and was seen as an opportunity to improve US-Iran relations which had been nonexistent since the 1979 Iranian Revolution. Players and coaches on both teams attempted to downplay the politics of the game, although tensions remained with Iran refusing to approach the Americans during the pre-match ceremony and anti-Iranian regime protests taking place in the stadium. These tensions and concerns over terrorism led to a large police presence at the match. Despite the concerns, the match itself was peaceful.

Iran's victory was met with large-scale celebrations in Iran, with the Iranian government presenting it as a display of the unity and superiority of the Iranian people. For the United States, the match was a major disappointment and saw them eliminated from the World Cup. The two teams would meet again twice, in a friendly played in Pasadena, California and in the group stage of the 2022 FIFA World Cup in Qatar.

== Background ==
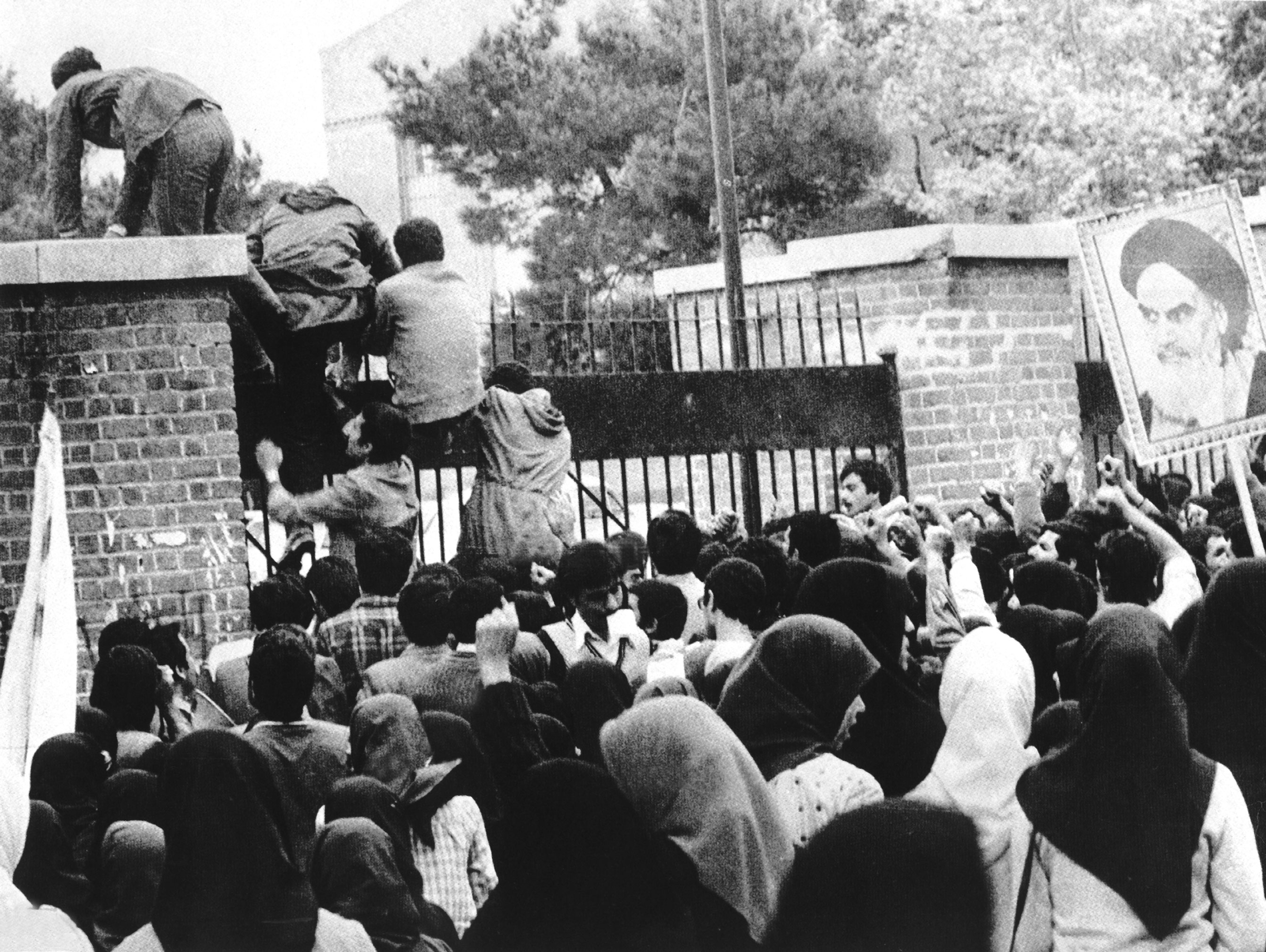
Iranian students scale the fence of the US embassy in Tehran where they would take 52 Americans hostage. The resulting crisis kicked off decades of enmity between the United States and Iran, contributing to the tension between their respective national teams at the 1998 World Cup.

The match was preceded by a series of events contributing to a hostile relationship between The United States of America and Iran. Poor relations started with the overthrow of the democratically elected Prime Minister of Iran, Mohammad Mosaddegh, by the US and the UK in a 1953 coup d'etat, due to his policy to nationalize Iran's oil industry. The coup saw the ascension of Mohammed Reza Pahlavi as Iran's sole ruler. Pahlavi, who was friendly with the United States throughout his rule, was deposed by staunchly anti-Western Islamic fundamentalists in the Iranian Revolution. Pahlavi fled the country, ultimately seeking asylum in the US, leading to the Iranian Hostage Crisis. Starting on 4 November 1979, 52 Americans were held hostage for over a year. Relations further soured when on 3 July 1988, a US Navy ship shoot down Iran Air Flight 655, killing all 290 people on board. The incident prompted Iran's Supreme Leader Ayatollah Ruhollah Khomeini to call for a "Real war" against the United States. Despite this, relations started to thaw in 1998 following reformist Mohammad Khatami getting elected President of Iran, which was seen by US Secretary of State Madeleine Albright as a new opportunity to normalize strained relations.

This 1998 World Cup was significant for Iran as it was their first World Cup since Argentina 1978. They had managed to qualify for the 1998 World Cup following a 2-2 draw against Australia in the Melbourne Cricket Ground, which prompted mass celebrations across Iran.

Coaching the Iranian national team was Jalal Talebi, who was appointed only three weeks prior to the Cup, following the firing of Croatian Tomislav Ivic in the aftermath of a 7-1 friendly defeat at the hands of AS Romana. Talebi had left Iran in 1980 and was living in the Bay Area of Northern California. It was there that he coached soccer at Foothill Junior College, where Steve Sampson, the US Men's National Soccer Team head coach at the time, had also spent time coaching.

The United States and Iran were placed in a group with Germany and Yugoslavia. In their respective opening matches, the US lost 2-0 to the former and Iran fell 1-0 to the latter. In their game against Yugoslavia, Iran was noted for their aggressive, "fearless" style of play, committing 30 fouls, in contrast to the US's "timid" performance against the Germans.

The head coach of the Iranian team stated that the game was nonpolitical, which was supported by Steve Sampsons' content nature about having a neutral Swiss referee. Despite these claims, this game was notably depicted in Iran as between them and The Great Satan, but this sentiment was largely avoided by the members of the Iranian team. "We don't have any problems with the United States players. We want to find new friends," said midfielder Alireza Mansourian. American players echoed the nonpolitical messaging: "I haven't heard anyone say, 'Let's beat Iran, let's do it for Bill Clinton,'" said midfielder Tab Ramos. Some Iranians felt their team had to win to honor or avenge the estimated 500,000 Iranians who were killed or injured in the Iran-Iraq War, in which the US supported Iraq. Khodadad Azizi, the Iranian team's striker, said "Many families of martyrs are expecting us to win", reflecting national sentiments surrounding the match.

The footballing and political leadership of Iran saw the World Cup and the match against the US as an opportunity to paint a positive picture of Iran to the world. The team was viewed as cultural ambassadors, with President Khatami declaring that virtuous behavior would be, "Your greatest victory, greater than any win or loss." The rhetoric from the Americans focused on peace and improving relations.

On the day of the match, Univision aired videotaped remarks by President Clinton:

The World Cup is beloved across our planet because it offers a chance for people from around the world to be judged not by the place they grew up, the color of their skin, or the way they choose to worship but by their spirit, skill, and strength. As we cheer today's game between American and Iranian athletes, I hope it can be another step toward ending the estrangement between our nations. I am pleased that over the last year, President Khatami and I have both worked to encourage more people-to-people exchanges and to help our citizens develop a better understanding of each other's rich civilizations.

In spite of calls for depolarization on both sides, the game was still marked by political tensions. A week prior to the match, French television aired the film Not Without My Daughter, which negatively depicted life in Iran. The broadcast was met with harsh condemnation from the Iranian embassy and Talebi. Additionally, there was a politically motivated bombing plot that was stopped shortly before the game. A group of Algerian Islamic fundamentalists who were part of an organization called the Groupes Islamic Armees, were apprehended in May. They were found to have explosives, detonators, fuses and guns and were planning to hide among the crowd to cause as much damage with as little effort as possible. Concerns about potential other plots led to both teams and their facilities being consistently surrounded by large security details.

== Pre-match ceremony ==
According to FIFA regulations, teams in each match are classified as team A or team B. Team B, Iran in this match, typically walks towards team A for the pre-match handshakes. The supreme leader of Iran, Ali Khamenei, "Gave express orders that the Iranian team must not walk towards the Americans." Mehrdad Masoudi, one of the FIFA media officers of the match, and Urs Meier, the Swiss referee, negotiated with the teams, and as a result, the Americans walked towards the Iranians.

During a carefully choreographed ceremony, the Iranian players gifted white roses to their American opponents as a symbol of peace. The American team gave the Iranians United States Soccer Federation (USSF) pennants, also as a symbol of peace. Both teams posed for a photograph together, an uncommon occurrence. These peaceful acts further highlighted the spirit of camaraderie that was building between the two teams. The sentiment of peace and camaraderie expressed in the ceremony contributed to FIFA awarding both teams the 1998 Fair Play Award.

== Match ==
=== Protests and security ===
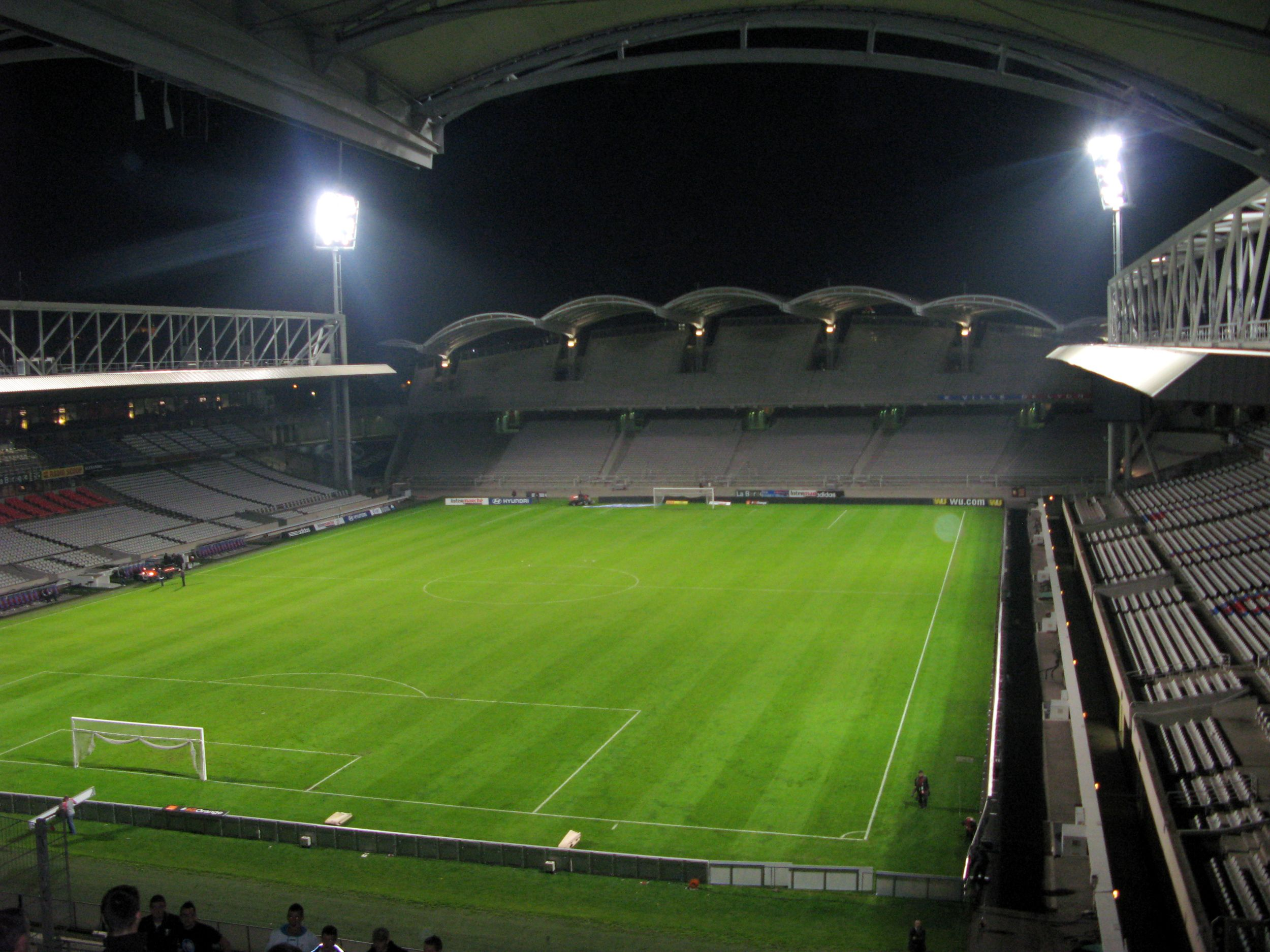
The Stade de Gerland, the site of the match. There was a large police presence at the stadium to counter potential terrorists and anti-Iranian regime protestors

The match was played at the Stade de Gerland with an extensive amount of security present. Around 150 French police officers were deployed throughout the interior of the stadium which was a huge number for a World Cup game at that time, with riot squads aligned on the perimeter of the field.

During the match, balloons and banners with slogans from the opposite team drifted onto the pitch; several spectators revealed shirts bearing images and symbols of exiled Iranian opposition leaders. Thousands of Iranians that were a part of the anti-regime movement Mujahedin-e Khalq gained access to a global stage for their demonstrations through purchasing tickets to the game. Demonstrations were met with French police quickly who were able to remove signs and out-of-line spectators. Broadcasters were told not to film the protestors to avoid further escalation and attention. Despite outbursts of tension and potential conflict, the stadium’s protestors remained largely peaceful, with some of crowd dancing the Macarena at half time. At full time, police surrounded the perimeter of the pitch anticipating a take-over; however, everyone left the stadium without trouble.

=== Summary ===
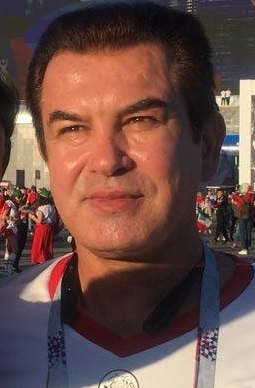
Hamid Estili (pictured at the 2018 FIFA World Cup) headed in a cross to put Iran up 1-0 in the 40th minute. His emphatic celebration became an iconic image of the match

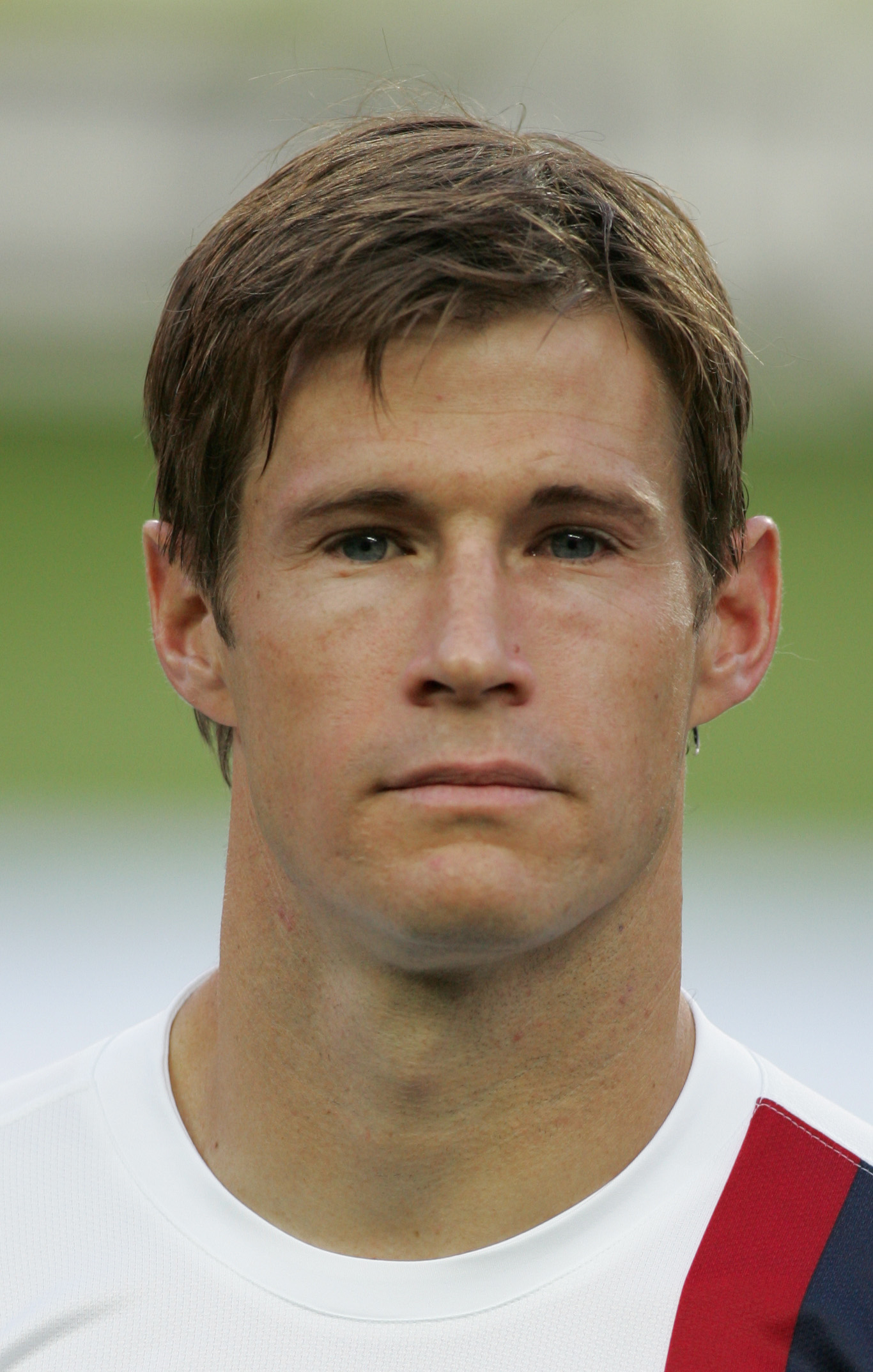
Forward Brian McBride scored the USA's sole goal against Iran, which ended up being the only goal the USMNT scored in their troubled run at the 1998 World Cup

The United States prevailed in the beginning of the game as their high press worked well and eventually led to opportunities on goal where they hit the post and crossbar within 30 minutes. Their dominance did not last long as Iran’s Hamid Estili’s header from a cross found the back of the net against United States goalkeeper Kasey Keller in the 40th minute.

Despite a sense of urgency about the Americans, Iranian goalkeeper Ahmad Abedzadeh kept the goals out with several big saves. Near the end of the second half at the 84th minute, Mehdi Mahdavikia slotted a low strike inside the far post after a quick counterattack. Nearly 3 minutes later Brian Mcbride made it 2–1 with a header from close range, however the Americans were unable to find an equalizer.

During the game, USMNT head coach Steve Sampson adopted a 3-5-2 formation, dropping the 3-6-1 that they used against Germany. Sampson also made several lineup changes, moving Joe-Max Moore from his usual position of forward to left-back. When Brian Maisonneuve was subbed in for Thomas Dooley, he was assigned to play "Kind of in the back but play in front of [the center-back]. I've never played in the back line, but I was supposed to be in midfield." Sampson also controversially decided to move key players, including Alexi Lalas, Marcello Balboa, and Eric Wynalda to the bench. All these decisions were met with frustration from the players.

=== Details ===
21 June 1998
21:00 CEST (UTC+2)

United States	1–2	Iran
McBride 87'		Estili 40'; Mahdavikia 84'

Stade de Gerland, Lyon
Attendance: 39,100
Referee: Urs Meier (Switzerland)

United States	Iran

GK	18	Kasey Keller
CB	3	Eddie Pope
CB	5	Thomas Dooley (c)		(substituted off) 82'
CB	6	David Regis	(yellow card) 18'
RWB	2	Frankie Hejduk
CM	10	Tab Ramos		(substituted off) 57'
CM	21	Claudio Reyna
CM	9	Joe-Max Moore
LWB	13	Cobi Jones
CF	7	Roy Wegerle		(substituted off) 57'
CF	20	Brian McBride
Substitutions:
MF	8	Earnie Stewart		(substituted on) 57'
MF	14	Predrag Radosavljević		(substituted on) 57'
MF	19	Brian Maisonneuve		(substituted on) 82'
Manager:
Steve Sampson

GK	1	Ahmad Reza Abedzadeh (c)
CB	4	Mohammad Khakpour
CB	14	Nader Mohammadkhani		(substituted off) 75'
CB	20	Mehdi Pashazadeh
RWB	17	Javad Zarincheh	(yellow card) 77'	(substituted off) 77'
CM	2	Mehdi Mahdavikia
CM	6	Karim Bagheri
CM	9	Hamid Estili
LWB	21	Mehrdad Minavand	(yellow card) 8'
CF	11	Khodadad Azizi		(substituted off) 74'
CF	10	Ali Daei
Substitutions:
MF	7	Alireza Mansourian		(substituted on) 74'
DF	5	Afshin Peyrovani		(substituted on) 75'
DF	3	Naeim Saadavi		(substituted on) 77'
Manager:
Jalal Talebi

Assistant referees:
Laurent Rausisi (Switzerland)
Nicolae Grigorescu (Romania)
Fourth official:
Lucien Bouchardeau (Niger)

== Aftermath ==
A major upset, the match was described by The New York Times as a "historic victory" for Iran. It was Iran's first World Cup win. The streets of Tehran were flooded with millions of jubilant Iranians, outside of Iran there were celebrations among thousands of Iranian Americans in Los Angeles and Iranian spectators in Lyon. Revelers openly drank alcohol and there were reports of women going without headscarves. The celebrations mirrored those that occurred after Iran qualified for the World Cup with a draw against Australia in Melbourne. The Iranian government took steps to rein in celebrations; however, the Revolutionary Guard were busy participating themselves. "They were football fans first," noted Masoudi. The game served as a unifying event for Iranians around the world, with Estili saying, "Many Iranians who are living abroad proudly confess that they're Iranian. That victory unified all Iranians."

The leaders of the Iranian government rejoiced after the defeat of the United States. President Khatami stated, "The heroes’ game yesterday demonstrated national unity and showed that the Iranian nation was deserving and capable." The head of the Iranian judiciary, Ayatollah Muhammed Yezi described the victory as, "A victory of Islam, Islam's characteristics and Islam's spirit over arrogance."

Supreme Leader Ayatollah Khamenei was the most aggressive in his rhetoric.

Our players’ victory over the United States is a beautiful image of Iran's national struggle in all aspects of life… The beautiful image of the victory of the Iranian athletes is a combination of wisdom and ability, with God's help… This unique struggle is what has given victory and glory to our nation in the course of the revolution, throughout the years of holy defense, and in all of the Iranian nation's conflicts with the Great Satan… Tonight the strong and arrogant rival once again tasted the bitter taste of defeat at [the players'] hands.

USSF president Alan I. Rothenberg referred to the loss as a "Bitter disappointment." Having lost two games and only scoring a single goal, the United States was eliminated from the tournament due to Germany drawing 2-2 with Yugoslavia earlier (putting both on four points and the United States with zero). Some American players were deeply upset with coach Sampson, viewing poor management, particularly the benching of Lalas, Balboa, and Wynalda, as contributing to the loss. Lalas and midfielder Tab Ramos blasted Sampson in the press with Ramos stating that he did not want to play on the USMNT if Sampson was kept as the coach. Sampson resigned his post following the US's exit from the Cup. All of the players who spoke out later apologized.

US defender Jeff Agoos said the players, "Did more in 90 minutes than the politicians did in 20 years," a remark that Sampson said was "Very astute." Looking back, Sampson stated that he would place greater emphasis on the politics of the game to motivate his team if he could do it again. This echoed Lalas's retrospective assessment that the US underestimated how much the game meant to the Iranian players.

Both teams lost their final group stage matches played on 25 July and were eliminated from the Cup. Iran was defeated by Germany 2-0. The already knocked-out United States was defeated by Yugoslavia 1-0. That game carried its own political weight due to the NATO bombing of Bosnian Serb military positions in 1995. The mostly Yugoslav Serb crowd booed and raised their middle fingers during the US national anthem.

Pos	Team	Pld	W	D	L	GF	GA	GD	Pts	Qualification
1	Germany	3	2	1	0	6	2	+4	7	Advance to knockout stage
2	FR Yugoslavia	3	2	1	0	4	2	+2	7	Advance to knockout stage
3	Iran	3	1	0	2	2	4	−2	3	
4	United States	3	0	0	3	1	5	−4	0	

Source: FIFA

Unlike events like the ping-pong diplomacy between the United States and China, the match failed to substantially improve relations between the US and Iran. Ayatollah Khomeini had set a strong anti-American policy during his tenure as Supreme Leader, leaving the reformist President Khatami little opportunity to engage in meaningful diplomacy. Additionally, public sentiment in Iran was deeply resentful towards the United States. Before and after the match high ranking Iranian politicians pointed to continued American hostility towards Iran as an obstacle to improving ties. The Iranian press continued to run anti-American stories. The newspaper Jumhuriye Eslami ran a two-part editorial entitled, "The United States is Still Iranian Enemy Number One," on the day before and the day of the game. Washington was less hostile, however the Clinton administration proved hesitant to further relations, though they did formally acknowledge US involvement in the 1953 coup and loosened sanctions against Iran. After the September 11 terror attacks relations hit a standstill as President George W. Bush adopted a less conciliatory Iran policy.

The match had a profound impact on the career of Iranian American Afshin Ghotbi, who was working as part of the technical staff of the USMNT. The emotional game between the United States and Iran persuaded Afshin into entering the path as a football coach, ultimately went on to take charge of the Iranian national team from 2009 to 2011, the second American to coach Iran after the very Jalal Talebi himself.

== Rematches ==
=== 2000 Pasadena friendly ===
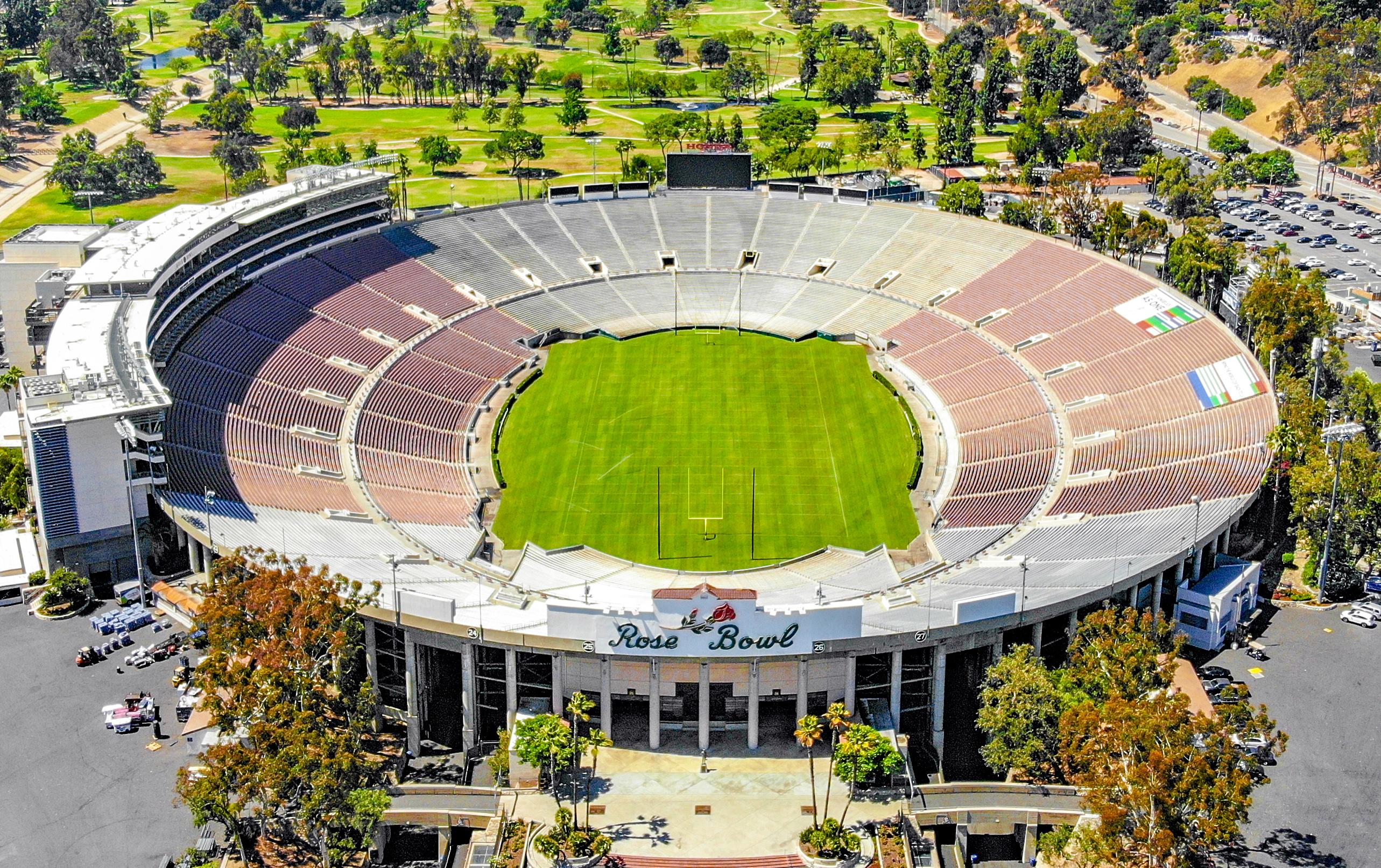
Like the Stade de Gerland in the 1998 World Cup match, the Rose Bowl had a large police presence for the 2000 match between the USA and Iran. The stadium was dominated by Iranian Americans who shared the peaceful and festive behavior of their World Cup counterparts.

Eighteen months after their meeting in the World Cup, the United States and Iran played a friendly match in the Rose Bowl in Pasadena, California, right outside of Los Angeles which held the largest Iranian population outside Iran. Due to the lack of official diplomatic ties, the match took six months to organize and was met with several hurdles. The match was originally scheduled to play in Washington D.C., but the location was rejected by the Iranians. The Iranian government demanded and was granted exception from being fingerprinted and photographed upon entry into the United States. Despite this, immigration officials in Chicago attempted to do so, prompting the delegation to threaten to immediately return to Iran. Thomas Meredith, the USSF's events manager, was able to defuse the situation by proving the team's exemption. Later, the Iranian Football Federation and the Iranian delegation to the United Nations objected to alcoholic beverage company Anheuser-Busch being one of the event's sponsors, but this too was quickly ameliorated. It was explained that Anheuser-Busch had a general contract to advertise with the USSF and that no company was directly involved in the staging of the game itself.

The game was played on 16 January before a crowd of 42,212 dominated by Iranian Americans and interspersed with plainclothes FBI agents. Security around the match was tight, with the airspace over the Rose Bowl being closed and the Iranian team receiving military, police, and Secret Service protection. Despite the concerns, The New York Times reported that the atmosphere was "festive and peaceful." The game ended in a 1-1 tie with Mehdi Mahdavikia scoring for Iran and Chris Armas scoring for the United States, his first international goal.

A second friendly to be played in Tehran was proposed but never materialized. When asked if he would go play in Tehran, US midfielder Eddie Lewis jokingly said, "What do we need to play in Tehran for? I thought we were in Tehran today," as a reference to the majority Iranian crowd.

=== 2022 FIFA World Cup group stage ===
Iran and the United States met again at the 2022 FIFA World Cup in Qatar on 29 November 2022, in their final match of Group B. The game was a must win for the United States who faced elimination after drawing against England and Wales. The United States defeated Iran 1–0 by a lone goal from Christian Pulisic, advancing to the round of 16 and eliminating Iran.

== See also ==
- Iran–United States relations
- Iran at the FIFA World Cup
- United States at the FIFA World Cup
