= Iraj Hatam =

Iranian footballer

Mehdi Nasiroghlou
Personal information
- Full name: Mehdi Nasiroghlou
- Place of birth: Iran
- Position: Midfielder

Senior career*
Years	Team	Apps	(Gls)
- Taj
1954–1955	Nirooye Havaei		

International career
1958	Iran	1	(0)
- * Club domestic league appearances and goals as of 27 May 2013

Iraj Hatam (Persian: ایرج حاتم, is a former Iranian football player. He played for Iran national football team in 1958 Asian Games.

== Club career ==
He previously played for the Nirooye Havaei and Taj.
