= Ahmad Tousi =

Iranian-American football coach (1947–2023)

Personal information
- Date of birth: 27 March 1947
- Place of birth: Tehran, Iran
- Date of death: 4 November 2023 (aged 76)

Managerial career
- Years: Team
- 1980–?: Daraei
- ?–1985: Rah Ahan
- 1984–1986: Iran (assistant)
- 1989–1991: Fresno State (assistant)
- Bullard High School
- 2008: Sanat Naft
- 2008–2023: Cal State Stanislaus

Ahmad Tousi (Persian: احمد طوسی; 27 March 1947 – 4 November 2023) was an Iranian-American association football coach who was head coach of Cal State Stanislaus. Tousi was a FIFA Licensed Coach. He resided in Fresno.

Tousi previously coached Daraei Tehran in Iran and was assistant coach of the Iran national team from 1984 to 1986 and coached Iranian youth teams in the past. He was the assistant coach at Fresno State from 1989 to 1991. Tousi was appointed head coach of Cal State Stanislaus in July 2008.

Tousi was a journalist and analyst, and wrote for Ayandegan, Mizan, Omide Iran and Donyaye Varzesh.

Ahmad Tousi died on 4 November 2023, at the age of 76.
