= Iran Premier Beach Soccer League =

Iranian beach soccer league

- Organising body: FFIRI
- Founded: 2008; 17 years ago
- Country: Iran
- Confederation: AFC
- Number of clubs: 10
- Relegation to: League 1
- Current champions: Moghavemat Golsapoosh
- Most championships: Pars Jonoubi (7 titles)
- TV partners: IRIB Varzesh
- Website: iranbs.ir

The Iran Premier Beach Soccer League is a professional beach soccer league, run by the Football Federation Islamic Republic of Iran. At the top of the Iranian Beach Soccer System, it is the country's primary competition for the sport.

The Iran Premier Beach Soccer League is recognized as one of the best leagues in the world and is the only professional beach soccer league which has a home and away format.

== Format ==
10 teams compete in the league where each team plays each other twice for 18 total games played for each team. At the end of the season, two teams are relegated to League 1.

== Current clubs ==
Team	City
Adak Nowshahr	Nowshahr
Chadormalu	Ardakan
Doctor Tamin	Isfahan
Foolad Hormozgan	Bandar Abbas
Moghavemat Golsapoosh	Yazd
Pars Jonoubi	Bushehr
Pas Javan Ganaveh	Bandar Ganaveh
Shahin Khazar	Rudsar
Shahrdari Bandar Abbas	Bandar Abbas
Vahdat Mehriz	Mehriz
