= 1989–90 Qods League =

Qods League
- Season: 1989–90
- Champions: Esteghlal
- Asian Club Championship: Esteghlal
- Asian Winners' Cup: Persepolis
- Matches played: 225
- Goals scored: 492 (2.19 per match)
- Top goalscorer: Mohammad Ahmadzadeh (16)

The following is the results of the Qods League's 1989–90 Iranian football season.

== Group stage ==
=== Group A ===
Pos	Team	Pld	W	D	L	GF	GA	GD	Pts	Qualification
1	Persepolis	20	11	9	0	34	10	+24	31	Promoted to Semifinals
2	Malavan	20	10	8	2	31	11	+20	28	Promoted to Semifinals
3	Nassaji Mazandaran	20	9	6	5	26	9	+17	24	
4	Tractor Sazi	20	8	6	6	19	17	+2	22	
5	Bank Sepah	20	7	8	5	22	16	+6	22	
6	Jonoob Ahvaz	20	8	5	7	20	20	0	21	
7	Sepahan	20	6	8	6	16	16	0	20	
8	Koma Shiraz	20	6	7	7	21	21	0	19	
9	Payam Khorasan	20	4	7	9	15	21	−6	15	
10	Esteghamat Yazd	20	3	5	12	16	41	−25	11	
11	Kaveh Bandar Abas	20	1	5	14	13	46	−33	7	

Source: Pars Sport
Rules for classification: 1) points; 2) goal difference; 3) number of goals scored.

=== Group B ===
Pos	Team	Pld	W	D	L	GF	GA	GD	Pts	Qualification
1	Esteghlal	20	15	3	2	52	10	+42	33	Promoted to Semifinals
2	Daraei	20	11	5	4	26	11	+15	27	Promoted to Semifinals
3	Tam Isfahan	20	9	7	4	20	11	+9	25	
4	Sanat Naft	20	8	7	5	28	17	+11	23	
5	Sha. Sari	20	8	6	6	23	23	0	22	
6	Machine Sazi	20	7	7	6	19	18	+1	21	
7	Pas Bushehr	20	6	7	7	19	21	−2	19	
8	Sh. Bandar Anzali	20	6	6	8	12	19	−7	18	
9	Kheybar Khorramabad	20	5	4	11	18	30	−12	14	
10	Pakdis Uromiah	20	4	5	11	18	31	−13	13	
11	Gostaresh Arak	20	1	3	16	8	52	−44	5	

Source: Pars Sport
Rules for classification: 1) points; 2) goal difference; 3) number of goals scored.

== Knockout stage ==
=== Semifinals ===
Team 1	Agg.	Team 2	1st leg	2nd leg
Daraei	1–8	Persepolis	0–2	1–6
Malavan	0–4	Esteghlal	0–0	0–4

Leg 1

Daraei	0 – 2	Persepolis
		F. Pious 70'; R. Abediyan 87'

Malavan	0 – 0	Esteghlal

Leg 2

Persepolis	6 – 1	Daraei
K. Bavi 16'; M. Moharrami 35,' 77' (pen.); F. Pious 41'; M. Ashouri 64'; R. Yosefi 84'		M. Emadi 48' (pen.)

Esteghlal	4 – 0	Malavan
A. Sorkhab 2'; S. Bayani 23'; A. Hashemi Moghaddam 38' 54'

=== Final ===
Team 1	Score	Team 2
Esteghlal	2–1	Persepolis

25 May 1990

Esteghlal	2–1	Persepolis
A. Sarkhab 47'; S. Marfavi 74'		N. Mirahmadian 8'

Azadi Stadium, Tehran

=== Final standings ===
Pos	Team	Qualification
1	Esteghlal	Qualification for the 1990–91 Asian Club Championship
2	Persepolis	Qualification for the 1990–91 Asian Cup Winners Cup
3	Malavan	
4	Daraei	

== Top goalscorers ==
16 goals

- (Iran) Mohammad Ahmadzadeh (Malavan)

13 goals

- (Iran) Samad Marfavi (Esteghlal)

11 goals

- (Iran) Ali Firozi (Sanat Naft)

10 goals

- (Iran) Morteza Yeke (Esteghlal)
