= Iran Taekwondo Association =

Taekwondo Association

- Sport: Taekwondo
- Jurisdiction: Iran
- Founded: 2001

Official website
- irantaekwondo.blogfa.com
- (Iran)

Ali Haghshenas

The Iran Taekwondo Association "I.T.A" (Persian: کانون تکواندوکاران ایران) is the First N.G.O & Non-governmental Federation of Iran sport which started its activities with the official authority of Iran's Interior Ministry and Justice Ministry in 2001.

This organization has established the first Taekwondo schools in Iran, and also trained many Taekwondo official coaches and referees. It has held competitions in different age groups, from infants to teenagers, youngsters and adults.

== Managers ==
Ali Haghshenas is the founder and President of this Association.

Javad Moshiri (Vice President), Munir Ghasemzadeh (Women Vice President), Mohammad Abdulipour (Secretary General), Mehran Khalili (Secretary of the Technical Council), Mehdi Ghasemi (Inspector), A. Sayyad (Legal assistant), Jafar Sharifi (Executive Committee Chairman) and Dawood Sertipi (Youth Branch Chief) are among the Managers of this Federation.

== Government oppositions ==
The Iran Physical Education Organization - Ministry of Sport and Iran Taekwondo Governmental Federation are two organizations which are opposed the activities of the I.T.A. This opposition has been declared from the early establishment of the I.T.A.

As a result, the organization of Iran Physical Education Organization announced its stance and opposition to the activities of this trade-specialized organization.

Mohammad Pouladgar (Former head of Iran Taekwondo State Federation & The current Deputy Minister of Sports of the Islamic Republic of Iran), joined against this organization and by asking other government bodies, he formed and organized an unprecedented government consensus against the Iran Taekwondo Association. As a result, the organization of physical education announced its stance and opposition to the activities of this trade-specialized organization.

These oppositions from the beginning of the foundation and announcement of the existence of the Iranian Taekwondo Association in 2001 in various ways, including trying to prevent the participation of the delegation teams of the association in international tournaments (previously in the Dutch tournament), trying to destroy the image of this institution and its managers in the public opinion, issuance of directives and instructions to the state sports departments of the provinces by the physical education organization and to the state taekwondo delegations of the cities by the state taekwondo federation have been expressed.

Ali Haghshenas, complained to the court against President of Iran Taekwondo Governmental Federation (Mohammad Pouladgar) and condemned him.

Pouladgar by paying bribes was acquitted by the verdict of the Judicial system of the Islamic Republic of Iran. However, the decision of the appeals court of Tehran province was not accepted by the I.T.A and it has been protested.

== Scientific activities ==
- Among the scientific activities of the Association, the following can be mentioned:

- Holding Specialized Scientific Seminars on the Development of Taekwondo in Iran.

- Writing and publishing of Scientific, Reference and Academic Books:

- The Martial Arts Encyclopedia: The First Martial Arts Encyclopedia in Iran, By: Ali Haghshenas (The President of I-T-A), Published in 2016, Iran, Tehran (The Fifth Edition -2023).
- The TopTaekwondo Doctrine: Taekwondo free style of the world, By: Ali Haghshenas (The President of I-T-A), Published in 2020, Iran, Tehran (The Third Edition -2023),
- The Pathology of Martial Arts: The First Persian Source of Pathology of Martial Arts, By: Ali Haghshenas (The President of I-T-A), Published in 2022, Iran, Tehran (The Second Edition -2023)

- Taekwondo Physiology: The First Taekwondo Physiology Reference Book in Iran, By: Ali Haghshenas (The President of I-T-A), Published in 2022, Iran, Tehran (The Second Edition -2023).
- The Role of the Coach in Taekwondo From the Base to the National Teams, By: Ali Haghshenas (The President of I-T-A), Published in 2023, Iran, Tehran.
- The Philosophy of Oriental Martial Arts (Okinawa, Wushu, Judo and Taekwondo), By: Ali Haghshenas (The President of I-T-A), Published in 2023, Iran, Tehran.
- Principles of Advanced Judging in Taekwondo, (Kyurogi, Para and Poomsae), By: Ali Haghshenas (The President of I-T-A), Published in 2024, Iran, Tehran.
- The first comprehensive Taekwondo refereeing authority in Iran (Hyeong, Kyurogi, Para, Poomsae and Hanmadang), By: Ali Haghshenas (The President of I-T-A), Published in 2025, Iran, Tehran.
- The TopTaekwondo, Kickboxing and Muay Thai, By: Javad Moshiri (The Vice President of I-T-A), Published in 2022, Iran, Tehran.
- Philosophy of Taekwondo, karate and Kang Fu, By: Javad Moshiri (The Vice President of I-T-A), Published in 2023, Iran, Tehran.
- The Tang Soo Do, Kuk Sool Won and Hapkido, By: Mehran Khalili Manesh (GS of the Technical Council and Vice President of Korean Styles of the I-T-A), Published in 2022, Iran, Tehran.
- Self-defense training in hand-to-hand combat, By: Mehran Khalili Manesh (GS of the Technical Council and Vice President of Korean Styles of the I-T-A), Published in 2022, Iran, Tehran.
