= Tam Isfahan S.C. =

Iranian football club

Tam Isfahan Sports Club (Persian: باشگاه ورزشی تام اصفهان, pronounced [ˈtɒːm-e eˈsfehɒːn]) is an Iranian Sport club located in Isfahan. The club is active in various sports such as football and volleyball. The most prominent success of the club's football team was placing third in Qods League in 1989, and promoting to 1993–94 Azadegan League, but they sold their licence to Zob Ahan.
