= Golestan Province League =

Football league in Iran

Golestan Provincial League is the premier football league of Golestan Province and is 5th in the Iranian football pyramid after the 3rd Division. It is part of the Vision Asia program.

The league will be held in two categories: Premier League Golestan with the participation of 10 teams and Division 1 with the participation of 12 teams in two groups of 6 teams Latest Iran League champions in 2014 who were called Shohaday Aqqala. The team has climbed to 2015 Iran Football's 3rd Division.
