= Iranian football league system =

Football (soccer) league of Iran

- Country: Iran
- Sport: Association football
- Promotion and relegation: Yes

National system
- Federation: Football Federation Islamic Republic of Iran
- Confederation: AFC
- Top division: Men: Persian Gulf Pro League; Women: Kowsar League Women
- Second division: Men: Azadegan League; Women: Azadegan League Women
- Cup competition: Men: Hazfi Cup; Super Cup; Women: Hazfi Cup Women Super Cup Women

The Iranian football league system is a series of interconnected leagues for professional football clubs in Iran. The top division for men is the Persian Gulf Pro League, and for women's football, the Kowsar Women Football League.

== Structure ==
The current structure has been in place since 2001. The highest level of men's club football is the Persian Gulf Pro League with eighteen teams. The second highest level is the Azadegan League, which consists of eighteen teams. At the third level is the League 2 which is made up of sixty teams evenly distributed into three groups. The fourth level is the League 3 with six groups and ninety six teams. The final level of the football system consists of thirty one provincial leagues, one in each province of Iran. Some of the provincial leagues are divided into further divisions.

The pyramid works with a promotion-relegation system, meaning that a team from the lowest level of the system can make it to the top level within a number of years. The number of teams in each league often changes from season to season, due to the lack of any professional management in the lower levels of the system. Currently the IPL is the only league that is considered professional, despite many of its rules about club facilities and management being broken. It is not uncommon for teams in the lower levels of the system to change team names because of sponsorship issues or for teams to completely withdraw from a competition.

The top five levels of men's football are managed by the Iranian Football Federation, while the lowest leagues are managed by the respective provincial football committee.

The Kowsar Women Football League (Persian: لیگ کوثر بانوان فوتبال ایران, Lig-e Kâuser-e Banuan-e Futbal-e Iran), established in 2007, is the top women's football league, also run by the Iranian Football Federation.

=== League system changes ===
Years	1st tier	2nd tier	3rd tier	4th tier	5th tier	6th tier
1970–1972	Local League	–	–	–	–	–
1973–1979	Takht Jamshid Cup	2nd Division	–	–	–	–
1989–1990	Qods League	-	-	–	–	–
1991–2001	Azadegan League	2nd Division	3rd Division	–	–	–
2001–2024	Pro League	Azadegan League	League 2	League 3	Provincial Leagues	–
2024-present	Pro League	Azadegan League	League 2	League 3	League 4	Provincial Leagues

== History ==
=== Before 1970 ===
Before the 1970s, Iran did not have an official national football league. Most clubs participated in championships of their city or province. Therefore, the champion of the Tehran Premier League was seen as the Iranian football champion. Due to their achievements in the Tehran Premier League, Shahin Tehran and Taj, today known as Esteghlal, were the most popular teams at this time. Also Daraei and PAS Tehran were successful clubs in Tehran's own league.

=== Local League ===
Local League champions
Season	Champions	Runners-up
1970–71	Taj	PAS Tehran
1971–72	Persepolis	PAS Tehran

In 1970, the Local League was created. For the first time, the league comprised also teams from many other cities and provinces including Sepahan from Isfahan and East Azerbaijan club Tractor. The first recognized Iranian football champion was Taj after beating PAS Tehran 2–1 in the final of the 1970–71 Local League. The incidents of the semi-final between Taj and Persepolis are also of great importance for the rivalry between both clubs. The second and last edition of the Local League was won by Persepolis.

=== Takht Jamshid Cup ===
Takht Jamshid Cup champions
Season	Champions	Runners-up
1973–74	Persepolis	Taj
1974–75	Taj	Persepolis
1975–76	Persepolis	Homa
1976–77	PAS Tehran	Persepolis
1977–78	PAS Tehran	Persepolis

In 1972, the Takht Jamshid Cup was founded as the national league and included teams from all over the country. The Iranian Football Federation had decided to create a league similar to European football leagues. The league was named after Takht-e Jamshid, the ancient Achaemenid capital known outside of Iran as Persepolis. The Takht Jamshid Cup comprised twelve clubs in the 1973–74 season. Persepolis became the first champions of the Takht Jamshid Cup, two points ahead of rival Taj.

Before the beginning of the 1974–75 season, the number of teams were increased from twelve to 16 teams. Esteghlal claimed its first Takht Jamshid Cup title after winning the league ahead of Persepolis. The 1975–76 Takht Jamshid Cup was won by Persepolis with a great performance by Iranian football legend Ali Parvin. The second place team was another Tehran based club, Homa. The next two seasons were won by PAS Tehran under coach Hassan Habibi. PAS Tehran won their championships both times ahead of Persepolis. At this time the Takht Jamshid Cup was one of the strongest football leagues in Asia. The Iran national football team won in 1976 their third successive AFC Asian Cup and qualified 1978 for the FIFA World Cup for the first time in the country's history.

The 1978–79 Takht Jamshid Cup season was abandoned due to the 1979 Revolution. Shahbaz was leading the league after twelve matchdays ahead of Persepolis and Taj.

=== 1979 Revolution and 1980s ===
Due to the Islamic Revolution and the Iran–Iraq War, the Takht Jamshid Cup was dissolved and also the lower leagues were unorganized. Once again the champion of the Tehran Province League was seen as the Iranian football champion. The league was dominated by Persepolis with five titles and Esteghlal with two championships. In 1987 the 17th of Shahrivar league was created with mainly teams from Tehran, but also with clubs from some others cities. The league was won by Persepolis ahead of Daraei. Due to the fact that the league was part of the Tehran Province League, Persepolis' title is today not accepted as a national championship.

=== Qods League ===
Qods League champions
Season	Champions	Runners-up
1989–90	Esteghlal	Persepolis

In 1989 the Qods League was formed as the national Iranian football league. The first official Iranian football champion since the revolution was Esteghlal. After only one season the Qods League was abolished.

=== Azadegan League ===
Azadegan League champions
Season	Champions	Runners-up
1991–92	PAS Tehran	Esteghlal
1992–93	PAS Tehran	Persepolis
1993–94	Saipa	Persepolis
1994–95	Saipa	Esteghlal
1995–96	Persepolis	Bahman
1996–97	Persepolis	Bahman
1997–98	Esteghlal	PAS Tehran
1998–99	Persepolis	Esteghlal
1999–00	Persepolis	Esteghlal
2000–01	Esteghlal	Persepolis

In 1991 the Azadegan League was formed as the top flight of Iranian football. The league was named as Azadegan League in honor of the Iranian prisoners of war who were released. Azadegan means the liberated in Persian. The league started with a format of 12 teams in the first season. In the 1992–93 Azadegan League season the league changed its format. 16 clubs participated in two groups of eight teams. PAS Tehran were the champions in both seasons. Before the start of the 1993–94 season, the league changed its format again. 14 teams participated in one group. Saipa won the Azadegan League title. Only one year later the league format was changed again. 24 clubs participated in two groups of 12 teams. Saipa defended their title in final against Esteghlal.

Prior to the start of the 1995–96 Azadegan League season, the league changed its format again. 16 teams participated in one group until 1999. Persepolis were the champions in 1995–96, 1996–97 and 1998–99, while Esteghlal became champion in the 1997–98 season. In 1999 the league was reduced to 14 teams. Persepolis won the 1999–2000 Azadegan League season, sitting seven points clear of rival Esteghlal. The 2000–01 season was the last year of the Azadegan League as the top-level football league of Iran. Esteghlal became champion in a league of 12 teams.

=== Pro League / Persian Gulf Cup ===
Pro League champions
Season	Champions	Runners-up
2001–02	Persepolis	Esteghlal
2002–03	Sepahan	PAS Tehran
2003–04	PAS Tehran	Esteghlal
2004–05	Foolad	Zob Ahan
2005–06	Esteghlal	PAS Tehran
2006–07	Saipa	Esteghlal Ahvaz
2007–08	Persepolis	Sepahan
2008–09	Esteghlal	Zob Ahan
2009–10	Sepahan	Zob Ahan
2010–11	Sepahan	Esteghlal
2011–12	Sepahan	Tractor
2012–13	Esteghlal	Tractor
2013–14	Foolad	Persepolis
2014–15	Sepahan	Tractor
2015–16	Esteghlal Khuzestan	Persepolis
2016–17	Persepolis	Esteghlal
2017–18	Persepolis	Zob Ahan
2018–19	Persepolis	Sepahan
2019–20	Persepolis	Esteghlal
2020–21	Persepolis	Sepahan
2021–22	Esteghlal	Persepolis
2022–23	Persepolis	Sepahan
2023–24	Persepolis	Esteghlal
2024–25	Tractor	Sepahan

The 2001–2002 season saw the beginning of the first professional football league in Iran.

On 12 August 2006, the Iranian Football Federation decided to change the name of the league once again, this time to "Persian Gulf Cup". This was done to promote the name of the Persian Gulf, instead of the many variations which some nations and organizations use which Iran claims are incorrect. The league logo was also changed, with the winner being selected from over 130 designs and unveiled on 14 November 2006.

The league changed its name from "Persian Gulf Cup" to "Persian Gulf Pro League" in 2014. The Iranian Football Federation decided also to change the logos of both the Persian Gulf Pro League and of the Azadegan League.

_{Notes
1. Taj changed its name to Esteghlal in 1979.
2. Shahin changed its name to Persepolis in 1968, which in turn changed to Piroozi in 1986; but the 'old' name Persepolis is still used in preference to Piroozi in Iran.
3. Azadegan League is now the name of the 2nd highest division in Iran, only the IPL is higher.}

=== Women's league ===
The Kowsar Women Football League was established in 2007.

== Championships ==
The number of national championships attained by football clubs in Iran since 1970. The national championships were suspended from 1979 to 1991.

Clubs	Winners	Runners-up	Current league
Persepolis	16	10	Pro League
Esteghlal	9	11	Pro League
Pas Tehran	5	5	•
Sepahan	5	5	Pro League
Saipa	3	0	Azadegan League
Foolad	2	0	Pro League
Tractor	1	3	Pro League
Esteghlal Khuzestan	1	0	Pro League
Zob Ahan	0	4	Pro League
Bahman	0	2	•
Homa	0	1	•
Esteghlal Ahvaz	0	1	•

== Current system ==
=== Men's ===
Level	League/Division(s)					
1	Persian Gulf Pro League; 18 clubs ↓ 4 teams relegated					
2	Azadegan League; 18 clubs ↑ 2 teams promoted ↓ 3 teams relegated					
3	League 2 Group 1; 14 clubs ↑ 1.5 teams promoted ↓ 3 teams relegated			League 2 Group 2; 14 clubs ↑ 1.5 teams promoted ↓ 3 teams relegated		
4	League 3 Group 1; 12 clubs ↑ 2 teams promoted ↓ 4 teams relegated		League 3 Group 2; 12 clubs ↑ 2 teams promoted ↓ 4 teams relegated		League 3 Group 3; 12 clubs ↑ 2 teams promoted ↓ 4 teams relegated	
5	League 4 Group 1; 10 clubs ↑ 2 teams promoted ↓ 5 teams relegated	League 4 Group 2; 10 clubs ↑ 2 teams promoted ↓ 5 teams relegated	League 4 Group 3; 10 clubs ↑ 2 teams promoted ↓ 5 teams relegated	League 4 Group 4; 10 clubs ↑ 2 teams promoted ↓ 5 teams relegated	League 4 Group 5; 10 clubs ↑ 2 teams promoted ↓ 5 teams relegated	League 4 Group 6; 10 clubs ↑ 2 teams promoted ↓ 5 teams relegated
6	Provincial Leagues; Alborz Province League, Ardabil Provincial League, Bushehr Province League, Chaharmahal and Bakhtiari Province League, East Azarbaijan Province League, Esfahan Province League, Fars Province League, Gilan Province League, Golestan Province League, Hamadan Province League, Hormozgan Province League, Ilam Province League, Kerman Province League, Kermanshah Province League, Khuzestan Province League, Kohgiluyeh and Boyer-Ahmad Province League, Kordestan Province League, Lorestan Province League, Markazi Province League, Mazandaran Province League, North Khorasan Province League, Qazvin Province League, Qom Province League, Razavi Khorasan Province League, Semnan Province League, Sistan and Baluchestan Province League, South Khorasan Province League, Tehran Province League, West Azarbaijan Province League, Yazd Province League, Zanjan Province League (league organized by provincial committees)					

=== Women's ===
Level	League/Division(s)
1	Kowsar Women's League; 12 clubs

== See also ==
- Pro League
- Azadegan League
- League 2
- League 3
- League 4
- League system
- Hazfi Cup
- Iranian Super Cup
- Kowsar Women's League
- Iranian Futsal Super League
- Iran Premier Beach Soccer League
