= Amir Hashemi =

Iranian footballer

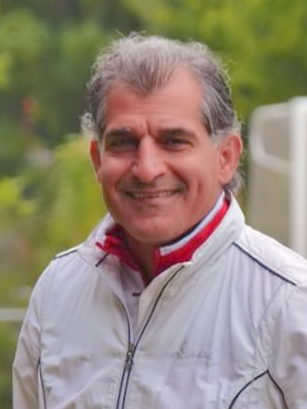

Personal information
- Full name: Amir Hashemi-Moghaddam
- Date of birth: 3 June 1966 (age 60)
- Place of birth: Tehran, Iran
- Position: Striker

Team information
- Current team: NEC B (manager)

Senior career*
Years	Team	Apps	(Gls)
1983–1985	Niroye Zamini		(34)
1985–1990	Esteghlal		(33)
1990	Torquay United		
1990–1991	Vasas SC	3	(0)
1991	San Francisco Bay Blackhawks		
1992–1994	Esteghlal		(9)
1997–1999	SV Colmschate '33		(23)
1999–2001	De Treffers		(7)

International career
1985–1990	Iran	14	(0)

Managerial career
- 2002–2005: SC Woezik
- 2005–2008: RKTVC
- 2008–2009: VV De Bataven (assistant)
- 2010–2011: Oss (assistant)
- 2009–2012: RKSV Margriet
- 2012–2014: VV Lunteren
- 2014–2016: AVW'66
- 2016–: NEC B
- * Club domestic league appearances and goals

Amir Hashemi-Moghaddam (born 3 June 1966) is a former Iranian football player. He resides in Beuningen, Netherlands.

Hashemi started his career in his native, Iran, with Niroye Zamini and Esteghlal. Hashemi played 14 times for the Iran national football team against Poland, Russia, Angola, Japan, S. Korea, Qatar, Thailand and some other teams. He finished his playing career in the Eredivisie, Netherlands' top flight. Recently Amir has finished his academic Football Trainer Schooling by KNVB (Royal Dutch Football Federation). He is an 'UEFA "A" licensed trainer coach.

On 19 September 2014 he became the coach of AVW' 66. And on 20 May 2016 he became the head coach of NEC Nijmegen .

He is studying now football teacher/instructor education by KNVB (Royal Dutch Football Federation) to become a FIFA football instructor/teacher.

Hashemi is an official Intermediary by KNVB and is since 2013 manager of Iran National Team football player Alireza Jahanbakhsh, who played for NEC Nijmegen en since 2015 by AZ Alkmaar Dutch premier league team Eredivisie.
