= Mohammed Al-Moeini =

Emirati footballer (born 1986)

Personal information
- Full name: Mohammed Ali Abdullah Al-Moeini
- Date of birth: 1 August 1986 (age 40)
- Place of birth: United Arab Emirates
- Height: 1.78 m (5 ft 10 in)
- Position: Left-back

Youth career
- Al-Sharjah

Senior career*
Years	Team	Apps	(Gls)
2006–2007	Al-Sharjah		
2007–2011	Dubai		
2011	Al Ahli		
2011–2013	Al-Nasr		
2013–2015	Hatta		
2015–2016	Dibba Al Fujairah		
2016–2018	Al Dhafra		
2018	→ Ittihad Kalba (loan)		
2018–2019	Al Urooba		
2019–2020	Al-Hamriyah		
- * Club domestic league appearances and goals

Mohammed Al-Moeini (Arabic:محمد المعيني) (born 1 August 1986) is an Emirati footballer who played as a left back.
