= Nader Mirahmadian =

Iranian footballer

Personal information
- Date of birth: 30 November 1962 (age 63)
- Place of birth: Tehran, Iran
- Position: Midfielder

Senior career*
Years	Team	Apps	(Gls)
–1991	Persepolis		
1991	Vasas SC	5	(1)
1997–1999	Mississauga Eagles		

International career
1990	Iran	2	(0)
- * Club domestic league appearances and goals

Nader Mirahmadian (born 30 November 1962) is a former Iranian football player.

== Career ==
Mirahmadian started his career in his native, Iran, with Persepolis. He was a midfielder of Persepolis in the 70s, who wore the captain's armband of this team and was known for scoring goals in the derby against Persepolis. He well remembered by football fans and football fans in that era.

In the spring of 1991, he signed with the Hungarian club Vasas, where he played in five matches, in which he scored one goal. He finished his playing career in Canada.

== International career ==
Mirahmadian played for the Iran national football team.

== Post-playing career ==
After retirement, he started working as a coach.<re>Profile: Nader MIR-AHMADIAN, #0

== Style of play ==
Mirahmadian mainly operated as a midfielder and was said to have "a normal physique and a face similar to all men of the 60s" during his playing career in Iran.
