= Masoud Moeini =

Iranian footballer (born 1949)

Personal information
- Date of birth: 22 March 1949 (age 77)
- Place of birth: Sari, Iran

Senior career*
Years	Team	Apps	(Gls)
- Rah Ahan
- Taj
- Daraei
- Ekbatan

International career
- Iran

Managerial career
- 1988: Persepolis (caretaker)
- * Club domestic league appearances and goals

Masoud Moeini (born 22 March 1949) is an Iranian retired footballer who played for the Iran national team and Taj. His brother, Fereydoun is also a former footballer and a teacher at the universities and was also team manager of Iran national team.
