= Nirooye Havaei F.C. =

Iranian football club

Nirooye Havaei
- Full name: Nirooye Havaei Football Club

Nirooye Havaei Football Club (Persian: نیروی هوایی) is an Iranian football club based in Tehran, Iran. It is the football team of Iran's Islamic Republic of Iran Air Force.

== 1956 Tehran Hazfi Cup ==
During the 1956 Tehran Hazfi Cup, Nirooye Havaei had defeated Taj SC in the semi-final, however the result was nullified because Nirooye Havaei had used a foreign player in the match. The game was replayed many times, the first rematch ending 1–1, the second rematch ended 3–3 and the third rematch ended in a 3–1 defeat to Taj SC, Nirooye Havaei thus missing out on reaching the final.

== Honors ==
Tehran Football Championship:

- Runner Up: 1951–1952, 1952–1953
