= 1979 Shahid Espandi Cup =

Exhibition football tournament in Iran

Shahid Espandi Cup (Persian: جام شهید اسپندی) was an official football tournament in Tehran that was played in 1979 in a format of 5 Groups for the group stage followed by a second round and then semi-finals and final. The tournament was won by Persepolis F.C.

== Group Stage Round 1 ==
=== Group 1 ===
Standings

- 1. Persepolis
- 2. Tehran Javan

=== Group 2 ===
- 1. Shahin
- 2. Rah Ahan

=== Group 3 ===
- 1. PAS Tehran
- 2. Sarbaz

=== Group 4 ===
- 1. Daraei
- 2. Akam

=== Group 5 ===
- 1. Bank Melli
- 2. Esteghlal

== Group Stage Round 2 ==
=== Group 1 ===
#	Team	Pld	W	D	L	GF	GA	Pts
1	Persepolis	4	3	1	0	6	2	7
2	Shahin	4	3	1	0	3	0	7
3	Daraei	4	1	1	2	3	3	3
4	Tehranjavan	4	0	1	3	4	6	1
5	Akam	4	0	1	3	1	6	1

=== Group 2 ===
#	Team	Pld	W	D	L	GF	GA	Pts
1	PAS Tehran	4	2	2	0	4	2	6
2	Sarbaz	4	1	3	0	7	4	5
3	Bank Melli	4	1	2	1	4	3	4
4	Rah Ahan	4	1	2	1	3	3	4
5	Esteghlal	4	0	1	3	2	8	1

== Semi finals ==
August 2, 1979

Persepolis	6–4 (Penalty kick)	Sarbaz

Shahin	1–2	PAS Tehran

== 3rd/4th-place match ==
Sarbaz	0–1	Shahin

== Final ==
Persepolis	1–0	PAS Tehran
