= 1988–89 Tehran Province League =

Tehran Football League
- Season: 1987–1988
- Champions: Persepolis

The 1988–89 Tehran Province League was the 67th season of Tehran Province League, remembrance of 17th Shahrivar. Persepolis won the league for the 4th time and 3rd time in a row.

== Results ==
Pos	Team	Pld	W	D	L	GF	GA	GD	Pts
1	Persepolis (C)	15	11	4	0	28	7	+21	37
2	Daraei	15	9	4	2	27	14	+13	31
3	Esteghlal	15	6	7	2	16	12	+4	25
4	Ekbatan	15	6	6	3	17	12	+5	24
5	Bank Melli	15	6	5	4	20	16	+4	23
6	Bonyad-e-Shahid	15	5	6	4	13	11	+2	21
7	Rah Ahan	15	3	10	2	14	12	+2	19
8	Niroye Zamini	15	3	9	3	11	10	+1	18
9	Vahdat	15	3	8	4	15	13	+2	17
10	Shahin Tehran	15	3	8	4	15	16	−1	17
11	Gostaresh Tehran	15	3	7	5	11	17	−6	16
12	Tehran Javan	15	3	6	6	12	15	−3	15
13	Bootan	15	4	3	8	12	19	−7	15
14	PAS Tehran	15	4	3	8	11	18	−7	15
15	Mineral Bank	15	1	9	5	8	16	−8	12
16	Homa	15	0	6	9	11	33	−22	6

Source: RSSSF
Rules for classification: 1) points; 2) goal difference; 3) number of goals scored.
(C) Champions

== Top goalscorers ==
13 Goals

- (Iran) Farshad Pious (Persepolis)

8 Goals

- (Iran) Samad Marfavi (Daraei)
- (Iran) Mohammad Falahati (Niroye Zamini)

7 Goals

- (Iran) Mehrdad Amini Shirazi (Bonyad-e-Shahid)
