= Tehran Province League =

Tehran Province league
- Founded: 1922
- Country: Iran
- Confederation: AFC
- Number of clubs: 16
- Level on pyramid: 5
- Promotion to: 3rd Division
- Relegation to: Tehran Province league 2
- Domestic cup: Hazfi Cup
- Current champions: Oghab
- Most championships: Esteghlal (13 Titles)
- Broadcaster(s): IRIB

Tehran Provincial League, formerly known as Tehran Clubs Championship, is the premier football league of Tehran Province and is 5th in the Iranian football pyramid after the 3rd Division. It is part of AFC's Vision Asia program.

Established in 1920, it is the oldest football league still being held in Iran. Tehran Clubs Championship used to be Tehran's and Iran's top flight until 1973 when Takht Jamshid Cup was established for the first time. During the 1970s Tehran clubs championship lost its importance and almost all of Tehran's top club participated in Takjt Jamshid Cup.

The Iranian revolution in 1979 put a stop to all football leagues and cups in Iran for a season and 1979–80 season was left unfinished to crowd violence in a friendly match between Tehran's rivals Esteghlal and Persepolis. In the 1980s due to the Iran-Iraq War no national league was held until the end of the war in 1988.

The 1990–91 season was the last season that Tehran's top clubs participated in this league and the next season they joined the newly established Azadegan League and hence Tehran clubs championship faded away and turned to 4th level of Iranian football pyramid and later on with the establishment of Iranian pro league in the 2001–02 season to the 5th level of Iranian football pyramid.

== History ==
Stablished in 1920, when for the first time there was a football competition in Persia, for the first decade, the cup consisted of a few Iranian clubs including Iran Club, Bank Shahi and an English club of British expats living in Tehran. in 1930s, Iran's most successful team was Tofan and in the 1940 Shahin and Daraei emerged as new rivals for Tofan,

Prior to this year no national league was held in Iran and each province of Iran had a separate local league for themselves and football clubs from Tehran used to participate in this league.

In the 1980s and due to Iran - Iraq war no national championship was held in Iran so Tehran provincial football league was the most important event in Iranian football calendar.

== Champions ==
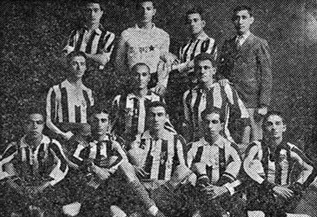
Tehran Club, champions of 1935–36

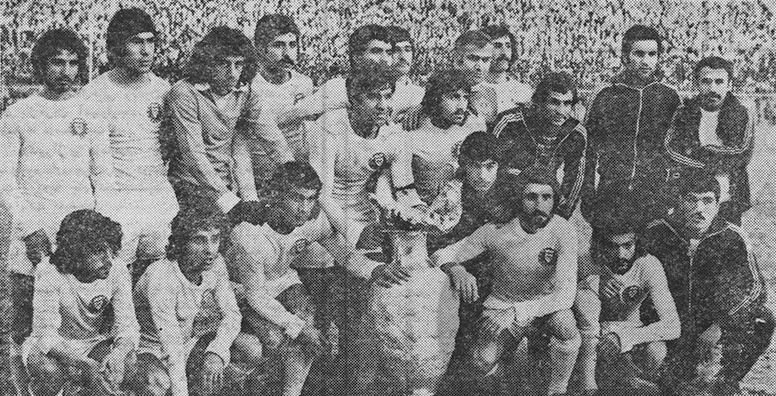
Daraei, champions of 1974–75

=== First Tier ===
Year	Winner	Runners-up	Third-Place	Top scorer (club) (goals)	Reference
1922–23	British Expatriate Tehran Club	Iran Club			
1923–24					
1924–25	Bank Shahi				
1925–26	Iran Club	Bank Shahi			
1926–27					
1927–28	Tehran Club	British Expats of Tehran Club			
1928–29	Was not held				
1929–30	Was not held				
1930–31	Was not held				
1931–32	Was not held				
1932–33	Tofan				
1933–34	Tofan	Shoa			
1934–35	Tadyoun	Shoa			
1935–36	Tadyoun				
1936–37	Tadyoun				
1937–38	Tehran Club				
1938–39	Tofan	Sport			
1939–40	Sarbaz				
1940–41					
1941–42	Daraei	Tofan			
1942–43	Sarbaz	Niknam			
1943–44	Daraei				
1944–45	Tofan				
1945–46	Unfinished				
1946–47	Sarbaz	Docharkhehsavaran	Shahin		
1947–48	Daraei	Shahin	Taj		
1948–49	Daraei	Shahin			
1949–50	Taj	Shahin			
1950–51	Was not held				
1951–52	Shahin	Taj			
1952–53	Taj				
1953–54	Nader	Nirooye Havaei			
1954–55	Shoa	Nirooye Havaei			
1955–56	Was not held				
1956–57	Taj	Shahin	Daraei		
1957–58	Taj				
1958–59	Was not held				
1959–60	Taj	Daraei	Deyhim		
1960–61	Taj	Daraei	Shahin		
1961–62	Daraei	Shahin	Taj		
1962–63	Taj	Shahin	Daraei		
1963–64	Was not held				
1964–65	Unfinished				
1965–66	Shahin	Daraei	PAS		
1966–67	PAS	Daraei	Oghab		
1967–68	Daraei	PAS	Tehranjavan		
1968–69	Taj	PAS	Oghab		
1969–70	Paykan	Taj	PAS		
1970–71	Taj	Persepolis	PAS		
1971–72	Unfinished				
1972–73	Taj	Oghab	PAS	Hasan Ebrahimi (Taj) (11)	

=== Second Tier ===
Year	Winner	Runners-up	Third-Place	Top scorer (club) (goals)	Reference
1973–74	Homa	Butan	Ararat		
1974–75	Daraei				
1975–76	Shahbaz	Eghbal	Naft		
1976–77	Dejban				
1977–78	Ekbatan				
1978–79	Akam	Kesht va Sanat	Sanaye Nezami		

=== First Tier ===
Year	Winner	Runners-up	Third-Place	Top scorer (club) (goals)	Reference
1979–80	Left unfinished due to crowd violence in Esteghlal-Persepolis friendly match				
1980–81	Left unfinished due to Iran-Iraq War				
1981–82	Homa	Persepolis	Bank Melli	Naser Mohammadkhani (Homa) (11)	
1982–83	Persepolis	Esteghlal	Ekbatan	Ali Parvin (Persepolis) (15)	
1983–84	Esteghlal	Persepolis	Bank Melli	Naser Mohammadkhani (Persepolis) (13)	
1984–85	Left unfinished due crowd violence in Persepolis-Pas match				
1985–86	Esteghlal	Shahin	Homa	Karim Bavi (Shahin) (9)	
1986–87	Persepolis	Shahin	Esteghlal	Farshad Pious (Persepolis) (7)	
1987–88	Persepolis	Daraei	Esteghlal	Farshad Pious (Persepolis) (13)	
1988–89	Persepolis	Daraei	Esteghlal	Farshad Pious (Persepolis) (13)	
1989–90	Persepolis	Esteghlal	Pas	Ali Asghar Modir Roosta (Pas) (14)	
1990–91	Persepolis	Esteghlal	Pas	Farshad Pious (Persepolis) (16)	
1991–92	Esteghlal	Persepolis	Pas	Farshad Pious (Persepolis) (16)	

=== Third Tier ===
Year	Winner	Runners-up	Third-Place	Top scorer (club) (goals)	Reference
1992–93	Saipa	Keshavarz	Bank Tejarat	Ali Daei (Bank Tejarat) (21)	
1993–94	Bank Tejarat	Ararat	Bank Melli		
1994–95	Fath	Rah Ahan	Fajr Sepah		
1995–96	Gostaresh	Keshto Sanat			
1996–97	Homa	Fajr Sepah	Moghavemat		
1997–98	Mohemat Sazi	Payam			
1998–99	Sanaye Defa'	Bargh			
1999–2000	Niroye Zamini	Vahdat			
2000–01	Keshti Rani	Bonyad Shahid			

=== Fifth Tier ===
Year	Winner	Runners-up	Third-Place	Top scorer (club) (goals)	Reference
2001–02					
2002–03					
2003–04	Dorna	Fajr	Talash		
2004–05	Naft	Sanaye Parchin	Entezam		
2005–06					
2006–07					
2007–08					
2008–09					
2009–10					
2010–11					
2011–12	Persepolis B				
2012–13					
2013–14					
2014–15	Kimia Farayand	Bahre Bardari	Parseh		
2015–16	Nezaja	Parag	Bahman Javan		
2016–17	Damash Tehran	Oghab	Gol Abrisham		
2017–18	Moghavemat	Alton	Shahin Sazeh		
2018–19	Oghab	Shahin Sazeh	Sitco		
2019–20	Shahin	Damash Parseh	Amad Nezaja		
2020–21	Setaregan Sorkh	Borna Rastin Maham			
2021–22	Damash Parseh	Pooya Deylam Aria Kia			
2022–23	Adak Kian Payetakht	Mahoor			
