= Daraei F.C. =

Iranian football club

Daraei FC
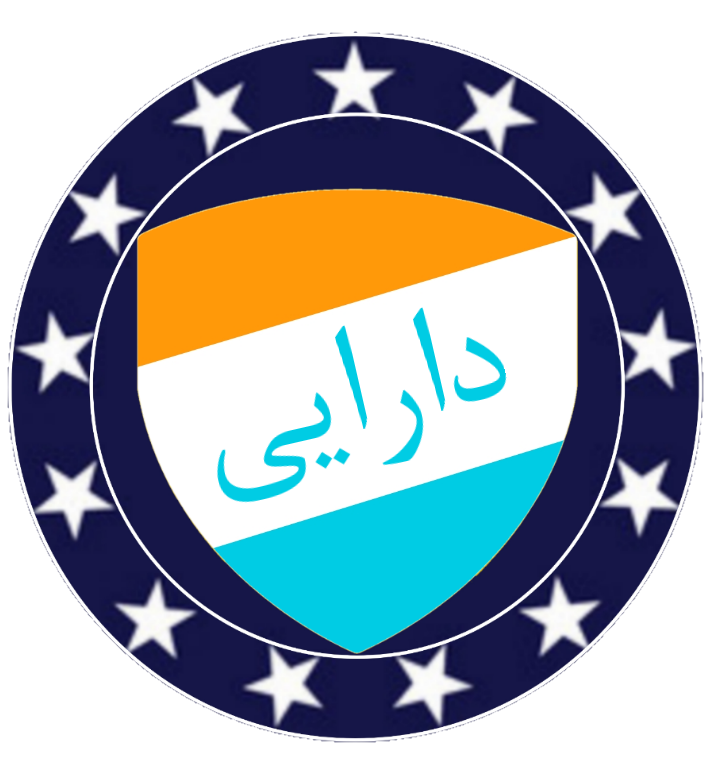
- Full name: Daraei Football Club
- Manager: Amirhossein Ghaffari
- League: Tehran Province league
- Website: http://daraeifc.com/
Home colours	Away colours

Daraei Football Club is an Iranian football club based in Tehran.

== Season-by-season ==
The table below chronicles the achievements of Daraei in various competitions since 1974.

Season	League									Hazfi Cup	Notes	Leagues Top goalscorer		Manager
Season	Division	P	W	D	L	F	A	Pts	Pos	Hazfi Cup	Notes	Name	Goals	Manager
1974–75	TFL	13	8	3	2	19	3	19	1st		Promoted to the Takht Jamshid Cup			Jalal Talebi
1975–76	TJC	30	9	15	6	19	15	33	6th					Jalal Talebi
1976–77	TJC	30	7	21	2	25	16	35	5th					Jalal Talebi
1977–78	TJC	30	6	10	14	26	38	22	15th	Not held		Hossein Fadakar	10	Jalal Talebi
1978–79	TJC	Not Completed Due to Iranian Revolution								Not held				Jalal Talebi
1981–82	TFL2	13	10	3	0	29	3	23	1st	Not held	Promoted to the Tehran Province league			
1982–83	TFL	17	5	7	5	13	12	17	10th	Not held				Ahmad Tousi
1983–84	TFL	17	5	7	5	11	18	17	11th	Not held				Ahmad Tousi
1984–85	TFL	Not Finished								Not held				Mohsen Haj Nasroalah
1985–86	TFL	9	2	2	5	8	16	6	8th	Not held				Amir Aboutaleb
1986–87	TFL	8	1	4	3	5	8	6	6th					Amir Aboutaleb
1987–88	TFL	17	10	5	2	20	12	25	2nd					Amir Aboutaleb
1988–89	TFL	16	8	6	2	24	16	30	2nd					Homayoun Shahrokhi / Mansour Amirasefi
1989–90	TFL	15	2	7	6	10	17	11	10th	Not held				
1990–91	TFL	17	8	5	4	14	7	21	6th					
1991–92	TFL	15	3	5	7	21	26	11	13th					Mohsen Haj Nasroalah
1992–93	TFL	26	4	8	14	15	31	16	13th	Not held	Relegated to the Tehran Football League's 2nd Div.			
1993–94	TFL2													
1994–95	TFL2													
1995–96	TFL2	15	1	3	11	7	25	6	16th		Relegated to the Tehran Football League's 3rd Div.			
1996–97	TFL3													

The table below chronicles the achievements of Daraei Novin in various competitions since 2012.

Season	League									Hazfi Cup	Notes	Leagues Top goalscorer		Manager
Season	Division	P	W	D	L	F	A	Pts	Pos	Hazfi Cup	Notes	Name	Goals	Manager
2012–13	TPL.Div 1								7th					
2013–14	TPL	27	12	7	8	45	53	43	7th					
2014–15	TPL													

=== Key ===
- P = Played
- W = Games won
- D = Games drawn
- L = Games lost
- F = Goals for
- A = Goals against
- Pts = Points
- Pos = Final position
- TJC = Takht Jamshid Cup
- TFL = Tehran Football League
- TFL2 = Tehran Football League's 2nd Div.
- TFL3 = Tehran Football League's 3rd Div.
- Div 3 = 3rd Division
- TPL = Tehran Province league
- TPL.Div 1 = Tehran Province league's 1st Div.

Champions	Runners-up

== Honours ==
- Tehran Football Championship
  - Champion (4): 1947–1948, 1961–1962, 1962_63,1967–1968
  - Runner-up (3): 1965–1966, 1966–1967, 1987–1988
- Tehran Hazfi Cup:
  - Champion (1): 1956–1957
  - Runner-up (1): 1948–1949
- Iran championship cup
  - Champion (1): 1962
- Qods League
  - 4th Place: 1989
- 17th of Shahrivar league
  - Runner-up

== Managers ==
- Ali Akbar Moheb 1940s
- ...
- Ahmad Tousi (1980–?)
- Mehdi Monajati
- Jala Talebi
- Attila Hejazi (2008)
- Amir Ghaffari (2024)
