= 2012–13 S.C. Damash season =

Damash
2012–13 season
- Chairman: Amir Abedini
- Manager: Afshin Nazemi (From March 2013); Omid Harandi (until 16 September 2012); Hamid Derakhshan (from 18 September 2012 to March 2013)
- Stadium: Dr. Azodi Stadium
- Iran Pro League: 11th
- Hazfi Cup: Semifinal
- Top goalscorer: League: Alireza Jahanbakhsh (8); All: Alireza Jahanbakhsh (9)
Home colours	Away colours

The 2012–13 season was Damash's 3rd season in the Pro League, and their 2nd consecutive season in the top division of Iranian football and 5th year in existence as a football club. They competed in the Hazfi Cup. Damash was captained by Mohammad Reza Mahdavi.

== Player ==
=== First team squad ===
Updated 12 June 2013

No.	Name	Nationality	Position	Age	Year signed	Signed from	Appearances	Goals
Goalkeepers
1	Milad Farahani	(Iran)	GK	24	2011	Paykan	36	0
22	Hassan Roudbarian	(Iran)	GK	34	2012	Rah Ahan	15	0
33	Behnam Laayeghifar	(Iran)	GK		2008	(Youth system)	1	0
Defenders
2	Mohammad Siah	(Iran)	DF, RB	27	2008–2010, 2012	(Free Agent)	36	0
3	Arilson	(Brazil)	RB, RWB	29	2012	(Brazil) Grêmio Barueri	7	0
6	Morteza Ebrahimi	(Iran)	DF	31	2012	Saipa	20	0
8	Alireza Nazifkar	(Iran)	DF	28	2008–2009, 2010	Nassaji	94	14
17	Hossein Koushki	(Iran)	RB	28	2011	Bargh Shiraz	26	1
20	Mohamad Mokhtari	(Iran)	DF	30	2008	Pegah	83	2
21	Abouzar Rahimi	(Iran)	DF, LB	31	2011–2012, 2012	Sanat Naft	46	0
29	Hadi Mohammadi	(Iran)	DF	21	2012	Sanat Naft	5	0
Midfielders
4	Abolfazl Hajizadeh	(Iran)	CM, DMF, DF	31	2012	Shahrdari Tabriz	21	0
5	Saeed Hallafi	(Iran)	CM	22	2012	Sanat Naft	12	3
7	Hossein Ebrahimi	(Iran)	RM, RW	22	2008	Pegah	65	5
9	Hadi Sohrabi	(Iran)	CM, DMF	24	2008–2011, 2012	Nassaji	49	1
11	Mohammad Reza Mahdavi	(Iran)	CM, AM	32	2008–2009, 2010	Steel Azin	114	13
12	Mostafa Hajati	(Iran)	CM, LB	29	2008	Pegah	104	4
13	Mohammad Abshak	(Iran)	CM, DMF	26	2008	Pegah	77	3
16	Rasoul Soroushnia*	(Iran)	CM, LB	26	2012	Saba Qom	12	0
25	Mohammad Ali Rahimi	(Iran)	CMF		2012	(Youth system)	2	0
30	Alireza Jahanbakhsh	(Iran)	LM, LW	19	2011	Damash Karaj	42	10
31	Alireza Nikbakht Vahedi	(Iran)	CM, AM	32	2012	(Free agent)	4	0
Forwards
10	Afshin Chavoshi	(Iran)	FW	28	2008–2009, 2010	Steel Azin	101	38
14	Amin Motevaselzadeh	(Iran)	FW	30	2012	Pas Hamedan	30	5
18	Reza Almaskhane	(Iran)	FW	25	2008	Pegah	16	3
19	Boubacar Kébé	(France)	FW	25	2012	(Free agent)	9	2
24	Masoud Hassanzadeh	(Iran)	FW	21	2012	Mes Rafsanjan	2	0

- This player changed his last name from Boroush to Soroushnia in December 2012*.

== Transfers ==
Confirmed transfers 2012–13

In: Note: Flags indicate national team as defined under FIFA eligibility rules; some limited exceptions apply. Players may hold more than one non-FIFA nationality.

No.	Pos.	Nation	Player
25	DF	IRI	Mojteh Rostami (from Shahrdari Langaroud)
2	DF	IRI	Mohammad Siah (from Free Agent)
6	DF	IRI	Morteza Ebrahimi (from Saipa)
9	MF	IRI	Hadi Sohrabi (from Nasaji)
5	DF	IRI	Masoud Zarei (from Paykan)
4	DF	IRI	Abolfazl Hajizadeh (from Shahrdari Tabriz)
22	MF	IRI	Mehdi Kiani (from Shahin Bushehr)
14	FW	IRI	Amin Motevaselzadeh (from Pas Hamedan)
18	FW	IRI	Reza Almaskhale (from Gahar Zagros)
23	GK	IRI	Hassan Roudbarian (from Rah Ahan)
16	MF	IRI	Rasoul Boroush (from Saba Qom)

Out: Note: Flags indicate national team as defined under FIFA eligibility rules; some limited exceptions apply. Players may hold more than one non-FIFA nationality.

No.	Pos.	Nation	Player
21	DF	IRI	Abouzar Rahimi (to Sanat Naft)
28	MF	IRI	Afshin Esmaeilzadeh (to Persepolis)
6	MF	IRI	Jahangir Asgari (Released, to Rah Ahan)
7	MF	IRI	Milad Zeneyedpour (Released, to Sepahan)
9	FW	IRI	Mohammad Gholami (Released, to Sepahan)
22	GK	IRI	Mohammad Mohammadi (Released, to Esteghlal)
14	MF	BRA	Magno (to Naft Tehran)
5	MF	BRA	Orestes Junior Alves (Released)
3	DF	IRI	Ali Hosseini (to Rah Ahan)
4	MF	IRI	Abbas Aghaei (Released)
19	FW	IRI	Farzad Mohammadi (Released)
25	DF	IRI	Milad Nosrati (Released)
—	MF	IRI	Mohammad Karimi (to Iranjavan)

In: Note: Flags indicate national team as defined under FIFA eligibility rules; some limited exceptions apply. Players may hold more than one non-FIFA nationality.

No.	Pos.	Nation	Player
19	FW	FRA	Boubacar Kébé (Free Agent)
—	DF	BRA	Arilson (from (Brazil) Grêmio Barueri)
—	DF	IRI	Abouzar Rahimi (from Sanat Naft)
—	MF	IRI	Saeed Halafi (from Sanat Naft)
—	MF	IRI	Alireza Nikbakht Vahedi (from Free Agent)
—	FW	IRI	Masoud Hassanzadeh (from Mes Rafsanjan)

Out: Note: Flags indicate national team as defined under FIFA eligibility rules; some limited exceptions apply. Players may hold more than one non-FIFA nationality.

No.	Pos.	Nation	Player
19	DF	IRI	Mehdi Kiani (to Sanat Naft)
5	DF	IRI	Masoud Zarei (released)
15	MF	IRI	Behnam Afsheh (released)
24	FW	IRI	Saeed Mortazavi (On loan to Parseh)
23	DF	IRI	Kenan Tahernejad (On loan to Chooka)
—	DF	IRI	Mohammadreza Edalatpanah (On loan to Chooka)

== Competitions ==
=== Overview ===
Competition	Started round	Current position / round	Final position / round	First match	Last match
2012–13 Iran Pro League	—	—	11th	20 July 2012	10 May 2013
2012–13 Hazfi Cup	Round of 32	QF	Semi-Final	13 December 2012	6 April 2013

Updated to match played 5 Jun 2013
Source: Competitions

=== Iran Pro League ===
==== Standings ====
Pos	Team	Pld	W	D	L	GF	GA	GD	Pts
9	Saba Qom	34	10	15	9	37	33	+4	45
10	Saipa	34	11	12	11	37	33	+4	45
11	Damash	34	11	10	13	36	47	−11	43
12	Fajr Sepasi	34	10	12	12	42	38	+4	42
13	Malavan	34	9	13	12	34	39	−5	40

Updated to match(es) played on 10 May 2013. Source: IPL stats.com
Rules for classification: 1) points; 2) goal difference; 3) number of goals scored.

==== Results summary ====
Overall								Home						Away					
Pld	W	D	L	GF	GA	GD	Pts	W	D	L	GF	GA	GD	W	D	L	GF	GA	GD
34	12	10	12	44	33	+11	46	8	5	5	21	14	+7	4	5	7	23	19	+4

Last updated: 10 May 2013.
Source: Ipl Stats

==== Results by round ====
Round	1	2	3	4	5	6	7	8	9	10	11	12	13	14	15	16	17	18	19	20	21	22	23	24	25	26	27	28	29	30	31	32	33	34
Ground	H	A	H	A	H	A	H	A	H	A	H	A	H	A	H	A	A	A	H	A	H	A	H	A	A	H	A	A	H	A	H	A	H	A
Result	D	D	W	L	W	D	D	L	L	D	D	D	W	D	W	L	W	D	L	P	D	L	L	L	W	W	L	L	W	W	L	L	W	W
Position	7	11	6	10	8	11	11	11	13	14	14	15	12	13	13	13	11	12	13	13	13	13	13	13	13	13	13	13	13	13	13	13	11	11

Updated to match(es) played on 10 May 2013. Source: "Ipl".
A = Away; H = Home; W = Win; D = Draw; L = Loss; P = Postponed

==== Matches ====
Win Draw Loss Postponed

Date Round	Home	Score	Away	Location

20 July 2012 1	Damash	1–1	Foolad	Rasht
21:15 UTC+04:30	Chavoshi 47'; Mehdi Kiani (yellow card); Mokhtari (yellow card); Motevaselzadeh (yellow card)		Karami 20'; Rahmani (yellow card); Afshin (yellow card)	Stadium: Dr. Azodi Stadium; Attendance: 7,000

25 July 2012 2	Aluminium	0–0	Damash	Bandar Abbas
22:00 UTC+04:30	Tighnavard (yellow card); Mohammadzadeh (yellow card)		Mahdavi (yellow card); Nazifkar (yellow card)	Stadium: Khalij Fars Stadium; Attendance: 8,000

31 July 2012 3	Damash	5–3	Paykan	Rasht
22:00 UTC+04:30	Jahanbaksh 24'; Chavoshi 28'; Motevaselzadeh 50'; Ebrahimi 53'; Jahanbaksh 64'; Ebrahimi (yellow card); Mahdavi (yellow card)		Ma'ghouli 69'; Tahmasebi 94' pen Mirshafian (yellow card); Soltani (yellow card); Ma'ghouli (yellow card); Ahmadi (yellow card); Tahmasebi (yellow card)	Stadium: Dr. Azodi Stadium; Attendance: 11,000

6 August 2012 4	Saipa	2–0	Damash	Karaj
22:00 UTC+04:30	Shahbazzadeh 51'; Gharibi 59'; Ayubi (yellow card)		Hajati (yellow card)	Stadium: Enghelab Stadium; Attendance: 2,000

19 August 2012 5	Damash	1–0	Persepolis	Rasht
19:10 UTC+04:30	Ebrahimi 68'; Nazifkar (yellow card); Berosh (yellow card) (red card)		Rezaei (yellow card)	Stadium: Dr. Azodi Stadium; Attendance: 20,000

24 August 2012 6	Mes	1–0	Damash	Kerman
22:00 UTC+04:30	Amraei 41'; Salaripour (yellow card)		Ebrahimi (yellow card); Nasiri (yellow card); Mohammad Mokhtari (yellow card)	Stadium: Shahid Bahonar Stadium; Attendance: 1,000

29 August 2012 7	Damash	0–0	Malavan	Rasht
19:00 UTC+04:30	Jahanbakhsh (yellow card)			Stadium: Dr. Azodi Stadium; Attendance: 10,000

15 September 2012 8	Fajr Sepasi	6–1	Damash	Shiraz
18:30 UTC+04:30	Ansari 12' 19'; Mohammadrezaei 28'; Nazari 45'; Mohammadrezaei 58'; Ansari 76'		Jahanbakhsh 20'; Kiani (yellow card); Mohammad Mokhtari (yellow card)	Stadium: Hafezieh Stadium; Attendance: 3,000

21 September 2012 9	Damash	0–1	Rah Ahan	Rasht
16:30 UTC+04:30	Ashoubi 93'; Ashoubi (yellow card); Hosseini (yellow card)		Siah (yellow card); Mohammadi (yellow card)	Stadium: Dr. Azodi Stadium; Attendance: 1,000

27 September 2012 10	Saba	3–3	Damash	Qom
17:15 UTC+04:30	Nouri 31' 42'; Momeni 86'; Nouri (yellow card); Hootan (yellow card)		Motevaselzadeh 27'; Jahanbakhsh 35'; Kiani 58'	Stadium: Yadegar-e Emam Stadium; Attendance: 1,000

1 October 2012 11	Damash	0–0	Zob Ahan	Rasht
16:15 UTC+04:30	Jahanbaksh (yellow card); Jahanbakhsh (yellow card); Nazifakr (yellow card)		Sadeghian (yellow card)	Stadium: Dr. Azodi Stadium; Attendance: NC

19 October 2012 12	Sanat Naft	0–0	Damash	Abadan
18:15 UTC+04:30	Aleksanyan (yellow card)		Ebrahimi (yellow card); Hajati (yellow card); Mahdavi (yellow card)	Stadium: Takhti Stadium; Attendance: 5,000

25 October 2012 13	Damash	1–0	Gahar Zagros	Rasht
15:30 UTC+04:30	Nazifkar 75' Pen. Koushki (yellow card); Hajizadeh (yellow card); Ebrahimi (yellow card); Sohrabi (yellow card)		Mehraban (yellow card); Kardoust (yellow card); Shafiei (red card)	Stadium: Dr. Azodi Stadium; Attendance: 5,000

30 October 2012 14	Tractor Sazi	2–2	Damash	Tabriz
15:30 UTC+04:30	Karimian 22'; Ebrahimi 85'; Ebrahimi (yellow card); Hajsafi (yellow card)		Mahdavi 12'; Kiani 50'; Mahdavi (yellow card)	Stadium: Yadegar-e Emam Stadium; Attendance: 30,000

18 November 2012 15	Damash	2–0	Naft	Rasht
15:30 UTC+04:30	Chavoshi 51'; Koushki 81'; Ebrahimi (yellow card)			Stadium: Dr. Azodi Stadium; Attendance: 2,000

27 November 2012 16	Sepahan	3–0	Damash	Fooladshahr
15:15 UTC+04:30	Khalatbari 50'; Navidkia 65'; Khalatbari 83'		Roudbarian (yellow card); Mokhtari (red card)	Stadium: Fooladshahr Stadium; Attendance: 1,000

4 December 2012 17	Damash	1–0	Esteghlal	Rasht
15:15 UTC+04:30	Kébé 85'; Hajati		Samuel (yellow card) (yellow card) (red card); Manouchehri (yellow card); Heydari (yellow card); Nekounam (yellow card)	Stadium: Dr. Azodi Stadium; Attendance: 20,000

25 December 2012 18	Foolad	2–2	Damash	Ahvaz
22:00 UTC+04:30	Sharifat 58'; Vali 61'; Sharifat (yellow card); Karami (yellow card); Ershad Yousefi (yellow card)		Nazifkar 28' pen Motevaselzadeh 64'; Rahimi (yellow card); Sohrabi (yellow card); Nazifkar (yellow card); Ebrahimi (red card)	Stadium: Ghadir Stadium; Attendance: 2,000

31 December 2012 19	Damash	1–2	Aluminium	Rasht
15:00 UTC+04:30	Kébé 85'; Hajati (yellow card); Mokhtari (yellow card)		Mohammadzadeh 8'; Pirzadeh 59'; Dadashvand (yellow card); Pirzadeh (yellow card); Nasehi; (yellow card) Kébé (yellow card)	Stadium: Dr. Azodi Stadium; Attendance: 2,000

4 January 2013 20	Paykan	v	Damash	Tehran
				Stadium: Takhti

13 January 2013 21	Damash	1–1	Saipa	Rasht
15:30 UTC+04:30	Mokhtari 76'; Arilson Mello Da Silva (yellow card); Hajizadeh (yellow card)		Daghighi 7'	Stadium: Dr. Azodi Stadium; Attendance: 3,000

18 January 2013 22	Persepolis	1–0	Damash	Tehran
15:30 UTC+04:30	Hossein Mahini 40' pen		Mokhtari (yellow card); Mahdavi (yellow card); Abshak (yellow card)	Stadium: Azadi Stadium; Attendance: 40,000

25 January 2013 23	Damash	0–1	Mes	Rasht
15:30 UTC+04:30	Jahanbakhsh (yellow card); Nazifkar (yellow card); Abshak (yellow card)		Mostafa Shojaei 8'	Stadium: Azadi Stadium; Attendance: 1,000

29 January 2013 24	Malavan	3–1	Damash	Bandar Anzali
15:30 UTC+04:30	Rafkhaei 9' 90+3' (pen.); Zare (yellow card); Nozhati 76'; Shirzad (yellow card)	Summary	Abshak (yellow card); Sohrabi (yellow card); Rahimi (yellow card); Roudbarian (red card) 90'; Hallafi 90+6'	Stadium: Takhti Stadium; Attendance: 7,000

3 February 2013 20	Paykan	0–2	Damash	Tehran
16:30	Kameli-Mofrad (yellow card)	Summary	Mostafa Haajati (yellow card); Jahanbakhsh 59'; Hallafi (yellow card) (goal) 78'	Stadium: Takhti; Referee: Yadollah Jahanbazi

9 February 2013 25	Damash	1–0	Fajr Sepasi	Rasht
16:30	Jahanbakhsh 20'; Hajizadeh (yellow card); Nazifkar (yellow card)	Summary	Jalili (yellow card); Alimohammadi (yellow card); Masoud Rigi (yellow card)	Stadium: Shahid Dr. Azodi Stadium; Referee: Shahin Haj Babaei

17 February 2013 26	Rah Ahan	1–0	Damash	Ekbatan
17:00	Rajabzadeh (yellow card); Ashoubi 59'; Asgari (red card) 90+1'	Summary	Abshak (yellow card); Hallafi (yellow card)	Stadium: Rah Ahan Stadium; Referee: Alborz Hajipour

23 February 2013 27	Damash	1–1	Saba Qom	Rasht
17:00	Koushki (yellow card); Hallafi 74'; Sohrabi (yellow card)	Summary	Kashi (yellow card); Momeni (yellow card) (goal) 64'	Stadium: Shahid Dr. Azodi Stadium; Referee: Javad Sharafi

1 March 2013 28	Zob Ahan	1–0	Damash	Fuladshahr
17:00	Sadeghian (yellow card); Farhadi 90+1'	Summary	Mostafa Haajati (yellow card); Jahanbakhsh (yellow card)	Stadium: Foolad Shahr Stadium; Referee: Ashkan Khorshidi

8 March 2013 29	Damash	3–1	Sanat Naft	Rasht
16:30	Mostafa Haajati 26'; Nazifkar 45'; Motevaselzadeh 71'	Summary	Arab 13'	Stadium: Shahid Dr. Azodi Stadium; Referee: Alireza Faghani

17 March 2013 30	Gahar Zagros	1–2	Damash	Dorud
17:00	Khorsandnia 88'	Summary	Mahdavi 29'; Ebrahimi 35'	Stadium: Takhti Stadium

28 March 2013 31	Damash	1–2	Tractor Zazi	Rasht
17:00				Attendance: 10,000

12 April 2013 32	Naft	2–0	Damash	Tehran
17:30

19 April 2013 33	Damash	2–1	Sepahan	Rasht
17:30

34	Esteghlal	1–2	Damash	Tehran
18:15	Ashjari		Mahdavi; Ebrahimi

=== Hazfi Cup ===
==== Matches ====
Win Draw Loss Postponed

Date Round	Home	Score	Away	Location

13 December 2012 1/16	Parseh	1–3	Damash	Tehran
14:15 IST	Ipakchi 85'		Jahanbakhsh 26'; Ebrahimi 44'; Kébé 69'	Stadium: Sanaye Defai Stadium; Attendance: 50

20 December 2012 1/8	Damash	1–1 (a.e.t.) (5–4 p)	Tractor Sazi	Rasht
14:00 IST	Mahdavi 50'		Salehi 26'	Stadium: Dr. Azodi Stadium; Attendance: 11,000
	Penalties
	(penalty scored) Nazifkar; (penalty scored) Abshak; (penalty scored) Hajizadeh; (penalty scored) Mahdavi; (penalty scored) Hajaati		(penalty scored) Kiani; (penalty scored) Paixão; (penalty scored) Iranpourian; (penalty scored) Ebrahimi; (penalty missed) Assadi

9 January 2013 26	Fajr Sepasi	0–0 (a.e.t.) (3–4 p)	Damash	Shiraz
14:00 IST				Stadium: Hafezieh Stadium; Attendance: 1,000
	Penalties
	(penalty scored) Nazari; (penalty missed) Esmaeili; (penalty missed) Ansari; (penalty scored) Hosseini; (penalty scored) Kazemi; (penalty missed) Ansari		(penalty scored) Nazifkar; (penalty scored) Jahanbakhsh; (penalty missed) Abshak; (penalty scored) Mahdavi; (penalty missed) Hajizadeh; (penalty scored) Rahimi

6 April 2013 26	Damash	1–1 (a.e.t.) (3–5 p)	Persepolis	Rasht
17:30 IST	M. Abshak (yellow card) 45+1'; M. Mokhtari (yellow card) 56'; Motevaselzadeh 70'		J. Hosseini (yellow card) 77'; Nouri 83'	Stadium: Dr. Azodi Stadium; Attendance: 12,000
	Penalties
	(penalty missed) Rahimi; (penalty scored) Abshak; (penalty scored) Chavoshi; (penalty scored) Ebrahimi		(penalty scored) Norouzi; (penalty scored) Mahini; (penalty scored) Hosseini; (penalty scored) Karimi; (penalty scored) Ansarifard

== Squad statistics ==
=== Appearances & goals ===
Last updated 12 January 2013

No.	Pos	Nat	Player	Total		Pro League		Hazi Cup	
No.	Pos	Nat	Player	Apps	Goals	Apps	Goals	Apps	Goals
1	GK	(Iran) IRI	Milad Farahani	20	0	18+0	0	2+0	0
2	DF	(Iran) IRI	Mohamamd Siah	20	0	14+4	0	1+1	0
3	DF	(Brazil) BRA	Arilson	9	0	6+1	0	2+0	0
4	DF	(Iran) IRI	Abolfazl Hajizadeh	23	0	17+2	0	4+0	0
5	MF	(Iran) IRI	Saeed Halafi	11	3	2+9	3	0+0	0
6	DF	(Iran) IRI	Morteza Ebrahimi	22	1	17+2	0	3+0	1
7	MF	(Iran) IRI	Hossein Ebrahimi	31	3	26+1	3	4+0	0
8	DF	(Iran) IRI	Alireza Nazifkar	33	3	30+0	3	3+0	0
9	MF	(Iran) IRI	Hadi Sohrabi	29	0	16+9	0	2+2	0
10	FW	(Iran) IRI	Afshin Chavoshi	26	3	13+11	3	0+2	0
11	FW	(Iran) IRI	Mohammad Reza Mahdavi	33	3	29+0	2	3+1	1
12	MF	(Iran) IRI	Mostafa Hajati	31	2	28+1	2	2+0	0
13	MF	(Iran) IRI	Mohammad Abshak	18	0	13+1	0	4+0	0
14	FW	(Iran) IRI	Amin Motevaselzadeh	31	6	14+14	5	0+3	1
16	MF	(Iran) IRI	Rasoul Soroushnia	12	0	9+3	0	0+0	0
17	DF	(Iran) IRI	Hossein Koushki	14	1	11+2	1	1+0	0
18	FW	(Iran) IRI	Reza Almaskhale	4	0	1+2	0	0+1	0
19	MF	(France) FRA	Boubacar Kébé	10	3	6+1	2	3+0	1
20	DF	(Iran) IRI	Mohammad Mokhtari	22	1	17+3	1	2+0	0
21	MF	(Iran) IRI	Abouzar Rahimi	15	0	13+0	0	2+0	0
22	GK	(Iran) IRI	Hassan Roudbarian	16	0	14+0	0	2+0	0
24	FW	(Iran) IRI	Asghar Nasiri	1	0	1+0	0	0+0	0
25	MF	(Iran) IRI	Mohammad Ali Rahimi	2	0	1+1	0	0+0	0
26	MF	(Iran) IRI	Mohammad Dadrasi	2	0	0+2	0	0+0	0
28	MF	(Iran) IRI	Armin Monfared Doust	0	0	0+0	0	0+0	0
29	DF	(Iran) IRI	Hadi Mohammadi	4	0	1+2	0	1+0	0
30	MF	(Iran) IRI	Alireza Jahanbakhsh	31	9	24+3	8	4+0	1
31	MF	(Iran) IRI	Alireza Nikbakht Vahedi	5	0	2+2	0	1+0	0
32	FW	(Iran) IRI	Hossein Hosseini	0	0	0+0	0	0+0	0
33	GK	(Iran) IRI	Behnam Laayeghifar	0	0	0+0	0	0+0	0
	DF	(Iran) IRI	Maziar Motaghi	0	0	0+0	0	0+0	0
	FW	(Iran) IRI	Mojtaba Rostami	0	0	0+0	0	0+0	0
	FW	(Iran) IRI	Masoud Hassanzadeh	2	0	0+2	0	0+0	0
Players who are no longer playing for Damash or who have been loaned out:
5	DF	(Iran) IRI	Masoud Zarei	1	0	1+0	0	0+0	0
15	MF	(Iran) IRI	Behnam Afsheh	9	0	2+7	0	0+0	0
23	DF	(Iran) IRI	Mehdi Kiani	13	2	12+1	2	0+0	0
24	FW	(Iran) IRI	Saeed Mortazavi	1	0	0+1	0	0+0	0
	DF	(Iran) IRI	Kenan Tahernejad	0	0	0+0	0	0+0	0
	DF	(Iran) IRI	Mohammadreza Edalatpanah	0	0	0+0	0	0+0	0

=== Top scorers ===
Includes all competitive matches. The list is sorted by squad number when total goals are equal.

Last updated on 5 June 2013

Rank	No.	Player	Pro League	Hazfi Cup	Total
1	30	(Iran) Alireza Jahanbakhsh	8	1	9
2	14	(Iran) Amin Motevaselzadeh	5	1	6
3	7	(Iran) Hossein Ebrahimi	4	0	4
3	11	(Iran) Mohammad Reza Mahdavi	3	1	4
4	10	(Iran) Afshin Chavoshi	3	0	3
4	19	(France) Boubacar Kébé	2	1	3
4	5	(Iran) Saeed Hallafi	3	0	3
4	8	(Iran) Alireza Nazifkar	3	0	3
9	12	(Iran) Mostafa Hajati	2	0	2
9	23	(Iran) Mehdi Kiani	2	0	2
11
11	6	(Iran) Morteza Ebrahimi	0	1	1
11	20	(Iran) Mohammad Mokhtari	1	0	1
#	Own Goals		0	0	0
TOTALS			36	5	41

=== Coaching staff ===
Position	Staff
Head coach	(Iran) Hamid Derakhshan
Assistant coach	(Iran) Afshin Nazemi
Assistant coach	(Iran) Mohammad Momeni

== See also ==
- 2012–13 Persian Gulf Cup
- 2012–13 Hazfi Cup
