= 2012–13 Hazfi Cup =

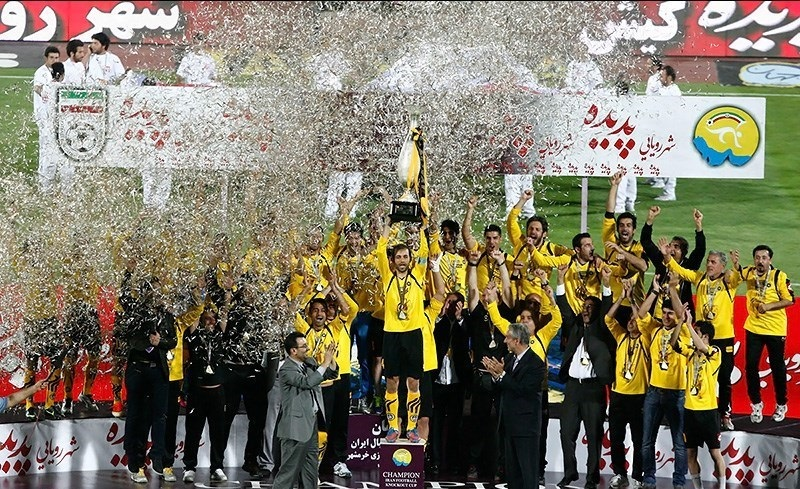

Tournament details
- Country: Iran
- Dates: 13 December 2012 – 5 May 2013
- Teams: 32

Final positions
- Champions: Sepahan (4th title)
- Runners-up: Persepolis

Tournament statistics
- Matches played: 31
- Goals scored: 86 (2.77 per match)
- Top goal scorer: Mohammad Nouri (5 goals)

The 2012–13 Hazfi Cup was the 26th season of the Iranian football knockout competition. Esteghlal was the defending champion, but was eliminated by Sepahan in the semi-final. The competition started on 13 December 2012 and ended on 5 May 2013. Sepahan won the title after defeating Persepolis in final.

== Results ==
=== Bracket ===
Round of 32
H	Tractor Sazi	w/o
A	Aluminium
H	Parseh Iranian	1
A	Damash Gilan	3
H	Saipa Shomal	1
A	Mes Sarcheshmeh	0
H	Fajr Sepasi	w/o
A	Sang Ahan
H	Zob Ahan	1
A	Hafari	0
H	Shahrdari Yasuj	4
A	Mes Kerman	1
H	Shahrdari Tabriz
A	Naft Tehran	w/o
H	Persepolis	6
A	Malavan	0
H	Esteghlal Ahvaz	2
A	Gahar Zagros	3
H	Esteghlal	4
A	Saipa	0
H	Saba	w/o
A	Naft Masjed Soleyman
H	Aboomoslem	2
A	Paykan	0
H	Niroye Zamini	1
A	Sanat Naft	3
H	Rah Ahan	w/o
A	Shahin Bushehr
H	Mes Rafsanjan	w/o
A	Bargh Shiraz
H	Sepahan	2
A	Foolad	1

Round of 16
A	Tractor Sazi	1(4)
H	Damash Gilan	1(5)
A	Saipa Shomal	1(2)
H	Fajr Sepasi	1(3)
A	Zob Ahan	1
H	Shahrdari Yasuj	0
H	Naft Tehran	1
A	Persepolis	4
H	Gahar Zagros	0
A	Esteghlal	1
A	Saba	1
H	Aboomoslem	2
H	Sanat Naft	3
A	Rah Ahan	2
H	Mes Rafsanjan	0
A	Sepahan	1

Quarter-Final
A	Damash Gilan	0(4)
H	Fajr Sepasi	0(3)
H	Zob Ahan	0
A	Persepolis	1
H	Esteghlal	5
A	Aboomoslem	0
A	Sanat Naft	0
H	Sepahan	2

Semi-Final
H	Damash Gilan	1(3)
A	Persepolis	1(5)
H	Esteghlal	1(4)
A	Sepahan	1(5)

Final
H	Persepolis	2(2)
A	Sepahan	2(4)

Note: H: Home team, A: Away team

=== Round of 32 ===
13 December 2012 1	Sepahan	2–1	Foolad	Fooladshahr Stadium, Isfahan
16:15 IST	Gholami 9'; Khalatbari 85'	Report	Pereira 60'	Attendance: 20,000; Referee: Mohsen Ghahremani

14 December 2012 2	Mes Rafsanjan	w/o	Bargh Shiraz	Bahonar Stadium, Kerman
14:15 IST				Referee: None
Note: Bargh Shiraz withdrew

14 December 2012 3	Tractor Sazi	w/o	Aluminium	Sahand Stadium, Tabriz
14:15 IST				Referee: None
Note: Aluminium withdrew

14 December 2012 4	Parseh	1–3	Damash Gilan	Sanaye Defai Stadium, Tehran
14:15 IST	Ipakchi 85'		Jahanbakhsh 26'; Ebrahimi 44'; Kébé 69'	Attendance: 50; Referee: Shahin Haj Babaei

14 December 2012 5	Saipa Shomal	1–0	Mes Sarcheshmeh	Shohada Stadium, Sari
14:15 IST	Torshizi 62' (o.g)			Attendance: 2,900; Referee: Rasoul Rahbarfam

14 December 2012 6	Fajr Sepasi	w/o	Sang Ahan	Hafezieh Stadium, Shiraz
14:15 IST				Referee: None
Note: Sang Ahan withdrew

14 December 2012 7	Zob Ahan	1–0 (a.e.t.)	Hafari	Fooladshahr Stadium, Isfahan
14:15 IST	Rajabzadeh 98'			Attendance: 12,400; Referee: Reza Kermanshahi

14 December 2012 8	Shahrdari Yasuj	4–1	Mes Kerman	Takhti Stadium, Yasuj
13:30 IST	Pourmand 21'; Cheraghi 56'; Jafari 90+2' 90+3'		Enayati 38'	Attendance: 1,200; Referee: Javad Sharafi

14 December 2012 9	Esteghlal Ahvaz	2–3 (a.e.t.)	Gahar Zagros	Ghadir Stadium, Ahvaz
14:15 IST	Sharafi 5'; Jaberi 114'		Torkashvand 17' 97'; Nayebi 120'	Attendance: 18,800; Referee: Jamshid Daneshmehr

14 December 2012 10	Esteghlal	4–0	Saipa	Azadi Stadium, Tehran
16:15 IST	Borhani 46' 66'; Hatemi 64'; Arze 90+4'			Attendance: 16,000; Referee: Toraj Haghverdi

14 December 2012 11	Saba Qom	w/o	Naft Masjed Soleyman	Yadegar Emam Stadium, Qom
14:15 IST				Referee: None
Note: Naft Masjed Soleyman withdrew

14 December 2012 12	Aboomoslem	2–0	Paykan	Samen Stadium, Mashhad
14:15 IST	Máximo 32' (o.g.); Azarpad 55'			Attendance: 30,200; Referee: Saeed Fatahi

14 December 2012 13	Niroye Zamini	1–3	Sanat Naft	Padgan G Stadium, Tehran
13:30 IST	Moghadam 71'		Khaleghifar 23'; Barzay 65'; Navidkia 85'	Attendance: 500; Referee: Mohammad Maleki

14 December 2012 14	Rah Ahan	w/o	Shahin Bushehr	Rah Ahan Stadium, Tehran
14:15 IST				Referee: None
Note: Shahin Bushehr withdrew

19 December 2012 15	Shahrdari Tabriz	w/o	Naft Tehran	Sahand Stadium, Tehran
14:15 IST				Referee: None
Note: Shahrdari Tabriz withdrew

19 December 2012 16	Persepolis	6–0	Malavan	Azadi Stadium, Tehran
16:15 IST	Norouzi 2' 50'; Ansarifard 19' 75' 80'; Rezaei 83'			Attendance: 30,000; Referee: Mohsen Torky

=== Round of 16 ===
20 December 2012 17	Mes Rafsanjan	0–1 (a.e.t.)	Sepahan	Takhti Stadium, Rafsanjan
13:30 IST			Sukaj 109'	Attendance: 5,000; Referee: Mehdi Seyed Ali

20 December 2012 18	Damash Gilan	1–1 (a.e.t.) (5–4 p)	Tractor Sazi	Dr. Azodi Stadium, Rasht
14:00 IST	Mahdavi 50'		Salehi 26'	Attendance: 11,000; Referee: Hossein Zargar
	Penalties
	(penalty scored) Nazifkar; (penalty scored) Abshak; (penalty scored) Hajizadeh; (penalty scored) Mahdavi; (penalty scored) Hajaati		(penalty scored) Kiani; (penalty scored) Paixão; (penalty scored) Iranpourian; (penalty scored) Ebrahimi; (penalty missed) Assadi

20 December 2012 19	Fajr Sepasi	1–1 (a.e.t.) (3–2 p)	Saipa Shomal	Hafezieh Stadium, Shiraz
14:00 IST	Nazari 7'		Norouzi 52'	Attendance: 17,000; Referee: Alborz Hajipour
	Penalties
	(penalty missed) Rigi; (penalty scored) Hosseini; (penalty scored) Shojaeian; (penalty missed) Khalili; (penalty scored) Ansari		(penalty scored) Rameshghar; (penalty missed) Riahi; (penalty missed) Kiani Moghadam; (penalty scored) Hezarjaribi; (penalty missed) Faraji

20 December 2012 20	Shahrdari Yasuj	0–1	Zob Ahan	Takhti Stadium, Yasuj
13:30 IST			Farhadi 74'	Attendance: 2,000; Referee: Mohsen Ghahremani

20 December 2012 21	Sanat Naft	3–2 (a.e.t.)	Rah Ahan	Takhti Stadium, Abadan
14:00 IST	Barzay 69' 84'; Arab 117'		Rajabzadeh 4'; Pashaei 40'	Attendance: 25,000; Referee: Saeid Mozaffarizadeh

21 December 2012 22	Aboomoslem	2–1 (a.e.t.)	Saba Qom	Samen Stadium, Mashhad
13:30 IST	Hamidi 101'; Shakeri 115'		Haghjou 113'	Attendance: 10,000; Referee: Ahmad Salehi
Note: The original match was scheduled to take place on 20 December but was postponed to 21 December due to heavy rain

22 December 2012 23	Gahar Zagros	0–1	Esteghlal	Takhti Stadium, Dorud
14:00 IST			Mousavi 66'	Attendance: 2,000; Referee: Yadollah Jahanbazi
Note: The original match was scheduled to take place on 21 December but was postponed to 22 December due to heavy rain

8 January 2013 24	Naft Tehran	1–4	Persepolis	Azadi Stadium, Tehran
16:30 IST	Manouchehri 14'		Nouri 26' 58'; Mahini 75' (pen.); Norouzi 84'	Attendance: 40,000; Referee: Saeid Mozaffarizadeh
Note: The original match was scheduled to take place in Takhti Stadium

=== Quarter-final ===
9 January 2013 25	Sepahan	2–0	Sanat Naft	Fooladshahr Stadium, Isfahan
14:30 IST	Bulku 27'; Talebi 61'			Attendance: 25,000; Referee: Alireza Faghani

9 January 2013 26	Fajr Sepasi	0–0 (a.e.t.) (3–4 p)	Damash Gilan	Hafezieh Stadium, Shiraz
14:00 IST				Attendance: 1,000; Referee: Yadollah Jahanbazi
	Penalties
	(penalty scored) Nazari; (penalty missed) Esmaeili; (penalty missed) Ansari; (penalty scored) Hosseini; (penalty scored) Kazemi; (penalty missed) Ansari		(penalty scored) Nazifkar; (penalty scored) Jahanbakhsh; (penalty missed) Abshak; (penalty scored) Mahdavi; (penalty missed) Hajizadeh; (penalty scored) Rahimi

9 January 2013 27	Esteghlal	5–0	Aboomoslem	Azadi Stadium, Tehran
17:30 IST	Samuel 25'; Hatami 46' 65'; Nekounam 63' (pen.); Montazeri 76'			Attendance: 35,000; Referee: Alborz Hajipour

5 March 2013 28	Zob Ahan	0–1 (a.e.t.)	Persepolis	Fooladshahr Stadium, Isfahan
15:30 IST			Nouri 102'	Attendance: 10,500; Referee: Alireza Faghani

=== Semi-final ===
30 March 2013 29	Esteghlal	1–1 (a.e.t.) (4–5 p)	Sepahan	Azadi Stadium, Tehran
17:00 IST	Hatami 63'		Khalatbari 42'	Attendance: 60,000; Referee: Alireza Faghani
	Penalties
	(penalty scored) Jabbari; (penalty scored) Samuel; (penalty scored) Mohammadrezaei; (penalty missed) Sadeghi; (penalty scored) Nekounam; (penalty missed) Rahmati; (penalty missed) Hatami		(penalty scored) Bulku; (penalty scored) Ebrahimi; (penalty scored) Khalatbari; (penalty scored) Hajsafi; (penalty missed) Jamshidian; (penalty missed) Irannejad; (penalty scored) Susak

6 April 2013 30	Damash Gilan	1–1 (a.e.t.) (3–5 p)	Persepolis	Dr. Azodi Stadium, Rasht
17:00 IST	Motevaselzadeh 70'		Nouri 83'	Attendance: 15,000; Referee: Saeid Mozafarizadeh
	Penalties
	(penalty missed) Rahimi; (penalty scored) Abshak; (penalty scored) Chavoshi; (penalty scored) Ebrahimi		(penalty scored) Norouzi; (penalty scored) Mahini; (penalty scored) Hosseini; (penalty scored) Karimi; (penalty scored) Ansarifard

=== Final ===
5 May 2013 31	Persepolis	2–2 (a.e.t.) (2–4 p)	Sepahan	Azadi Stadium, Tehran
18:00 IST	Ansarifard 24'; Nouri 99'		Sukaj 59'; Gholami 106'	Attendance: 97,452; Referee: Alireza Faghani
	Penalties
	(penalty missed) Norouzi; (penalty scored) Mahini; (penalty missed) Haghighi; (penalty scored) Naghizadeh		(penalty scored) Bulku; (penalty scored) Khalatbari; (penalty scored) Ebrahimi; (penalty scored) Hajsafi

== Goal scorers ==
5 goals

- (Iran) Mohammad Nouri (Persepolis)

4 goals

- (Iran) Farzad Hatami (Esteghlal)
- (Iran) Karim Ansarifard (Persepolis)

3 goals

- (Iran) Behnam Barzay (Sanat Naft)
- (Iran) Hadi Norouzi (Persepolis)

2 goals

- (Iran) Milad Jafari (Shahrdari Yasuj)
- (Iran) Mohammad Reza Khalatbari (Sepahan)
- (Albania) Xhevahir Sukaj (Sepahan)
- (Iran) Mohammad Gholami (Sepahan)
- (Iran) Amin Torkashvand (Gahar Zagros)
- (Iran) Arash Borhani (Esteghlal)

1 goals

- (Albania) Ervin Bulku (Sepahan)
- (Iran) Farshid Talebi (Sepahan)
- (Brazil) Luciano Pereira (Foolad)
- (Iran) Mohammad Pourmand (Shahrdari Yasuj)
- (Iran) Mostafa Cheraghi (Shahrdari Yasuj)
- (Iran) Reza Enayati (Mes Kerman)
- (Iran) Reza Khaleghifar (Sanat Naft)
- (Iran) Rasoul Navidkia (Sanat Naft)
- (Iran) Rouhollah Arab (Sanat Naft)
- (Iran) Ali Salmani Moghadam (Niroye Zamini)
- (Iran) Reza Jaberi (Esteghlal Ahvaz)
- (Iran) Amir Sharafi (Esteghlal Ahvaz)
- (Iran) Taghi Nayebi (Gahar Zagros)
- (Iran) Alireza Jahanbakhsh (Damash Gilan)
- (Iran) Morteza Ebrahimi (Damash Gilan)
- (France) Boubacar Kébé (Damash Gilan)
- (Iran) Mohammad Reza Mahdavi (Damash Gilan)
- (Iran) Amin Motevaselzadeh (Damash Gilan)
- (Iran) Mohsen Azarpad (Aboomoslem)
- (Iran) Farzad Hamidi (Aboomoslem)
- (Iran) Younes Shakeri (Aboomoslem)
- (Iran) Amir Hossein Ipakchi (Parseh)
- (Iran) Mehdi Rajabzadeh (Zob Ahan)
- (Iran) Esmaeil Farhadi (Zob Ahan)
- (Bolivia) Vicente Arze (Esteghlal)
- (Iran) Iman Mousavi (Esteghlal)
- (Trinidad and Tobago) Jlloyd Samuel (Esteghlal)
- (Iran) Javad Nekounam (Esteghlal)
- (Iran) Pejman Montazeri (Esteghlal)
- (Iran) Gholamreza Rezaei (Persepolis)
- (Iran) Hossein Mahini (Persepolis)
- (Iran) Mohammad Hassan Rajabzadeh (Rah Ahan)
- (Iran) Hossein Pashaei (Rah Ahan)
- (Iran) Mehdi Nazari (Fajr Sepasi)
- (Iran) Mehdi Seyed Salehi (Tractor Sazi)
- (Iran) Mojtaba Norouzi (Saipa Shomal)
- (Iran) Masoud Haghjou (Saba Qom)
- (Iran) Amin Manouchehri (Naft Tehran)

Own goals

- (Brazil) Diego Máximo (Paykan), Scored for Aboomoslem (1)
- (Iran) Mojtaba Torshizi (Mes Sarcheshmeh), Scored for Saipa Shomal (1)

== See also ==
- 2012–13 Persian Gulf Cup
- 2012–13 Azadegan League
- 2012–13 Iran Football's 2nd Division
- 2012–13 Iran Football's 3rd Division
- Iranian Super Cup
- 2012–13 Iranian Futsal Super League
