= 2015–16 S.C. Damash season =

Damash
2015–16 season
- Chairman: Amir Abedini
- Manager: Majid Jahanpour
- Stadium: Dr. Azodi Stadium
Home colours	Away colours

The 2015–16 season was the Damash's 4th season in the Azadegan League, and their 2nd consecutive season in the 1st division of Iranian Football and 6th year in existence as a football club. They competed in the Hazfi Cup. Damash was captained by Mohammad Reza Mahdavi and Mostafa Hajati.

== Player ==
=== First team squad ===
Last updated 16 May

No.	Name	Nationality	Position	Age	Year (s) Signed	Signed From	Appearance (s)	Goal (s)
Goalkeepers
1	Reza Mohammadi	(Iran)	GK	30	2015	Naft Masjed Soleyman	26	0
23	Milad Pourgholi ^{U23}	(Iran)	GK		2014	Damash U21	9	0
33	Ashkan Tavana	(Iran)	GK		2015	Sepidrood	2	0
44	Reza Gholampour ^{U23}	(Iran)	GK		2014	Damash U21	0	0
Defenders
4	Behnam Asgharkhani	(Iran)	DF		2014	Alvand	38	0
5	Armin Monfared Doust ^{U23}	(Iran)	DF		2015	Fajr Sepasi	18	0
8	Saeid Ghadami	(Iran)	LB	24	2013 & 2016	Sanat Naft	32	1
19	Mahyar Nouri ^{U23}	(Iran)	DF		2014	Damash U21	50	0
20	Mohammad Talebi ^{U21}	(Iran)	DF		2015	Free agent	19	1
21	Mojtaba Farzampour ^{U23}	(Iran)	DF		2013		23	0
25	Mohammadreza Mehdizadeh ^{U23}	(Iran)	DF				24	0
27	Amirreza Ghamnak ^{U21}	(Iran)	DF		2014	Damash U21	17	0
28	Masoud Mikaeili	(Iran)	DF	29	2008 & 2016	Free agent	66	0
Midfielders
2	Hossein Gohari	(Iran)	CM		2015	Free agent	15	0
6	Mohammad Rostami	(Iran)	CM	30	2014	Aboumoslem	50	6
9	Hadi Sohrabi	(Iran)	CM, DMF	25	2008 & 2012	Nassaji	120	5
11	Mohammad Reza Mahdavi	(Iran)	CM, AM	35	2008,10 & 2016	Free agent	147	16
14	Mostafa Hajati	(Iran)	CM, LB	32	2008 & 2015	Sepidrood	152	12
29	Hafez Yaghoubi ^{U21}	(Iran)	CM		2015	Malavan U19	24	1
	Alireza Okhravi ^{U21}	(Iran)	CM		2015	Esteghlal U19	1	0
Forwards
7	Reza Almaskhane	(Iran)	CF	28	2008	Pegah		
10	Saeid Mortazavi	(Iran)	CF, LW	25	2012	(Youth system)	45	4
12	Milad Ghorbanzadeh	(Iran)	CF		2014	Caspian Qazvin	49	6
13	Mohammad Heydari	(Iran)	CF		2015	Saba Qom	21	2
17	Mohammad Jafari	(Iran)	CF		2015	Sepidrood	10	0
26	Saeed Talebi ^{U23}	(Iran)	CF		2014	Damash U21	42	2
40	Hassan Najafi	(Iran)	CF		2014	Esteghlal Ahvaz	37	6
72	Hossein Hejazian	(Iran)	CF		2016	Gol Gohar	9	1
77	Hamid Khodabandelou	(Iran)	CF	25	2013	Esteghlal Khuzestan	49	3

== Transfers ==
=== Summer ===
In: Note: Flags indicate national team as defined under FIFA eligibility rules; some limited exceptions apply. Players may hold more than one non-FIFA nationality.

No.	Pos.	Nation	Player
—	GK	(Iran) IRN	Ashkan Tavana (from Sepidrood Rasht)
—	MF	(Iran) IRN	Mohammadreza Almaskhaleh (from Sepidrood Rasht)
—	MF	(Iran) IRN	Mohammad Jafari (from Sepidrood Rasht)
—	MF	(Iran) IRN	Hafez Yaghoubi (from Malavan U19)
—	MF	(Iran) IRN	Mohammad Talebi (from Free agent)
—	GK	(Iran) IRN	Reza Mohammadi (from Naft Masjed Soleyman)
—	FW	(Iran) IRN	Mohammad Heydari (from Saba Qom)
—	DF	(Iran) IRN	Mostafa Hajati (from Sepidrood Rasht)
—	MF	(Iran) IRN	Alireza Okhravi (from Esteghlal U19)

Out: Note: Flags indicate national team as defined under FIFA eligibility rules; some limited exceptions apply. Players may hold more than one non-FIFA nationality.

No.	Pos.	Nation	Player
2	DF	(Iran) IRN	Amir Tizrou (to Siah Jamegan Khorasan)
18	MF	(Iran) IRN	Mohammad Dadresi (to Sepidrood Rasht)
7	MF	(Iran) IRN	Hamed Pouromrani (to Sepidrood Rasht)
33	GK	(Iran) IRN	Behnam Laayeghifar (to Sepidrood Rasht)
10	FW	(Iran) IRN	Afshin Chavoshi (to Sepidrood Rasht)
9	DF	(Iran) IRN	Saeid Ghadami (Released)
20	MF	(Iran) IRN	Amin Torkashvand (to Sepidrood Rasht)
16	DF	(Iran) IRN	Mehdi Kiani (Released)
24	MF	(Iran) IRN	Vahid Hosseinzade (Released)
34	DF	(Iran) IRN	Adel Masoudifar (Released)
29	MF	(Iran) IRN	Kianoosh Mirzaei (to Aluminium Hormozgan)
—	MF	(Iran) IRN	Hadi Daghagheleh (Released)
—	MF	(Iran) IRN	Pejman Maleki (Released)

=== Winter ===
In: Note: Flags indicate national team as defined under FIFA eligibility rules; some limited exceptions apply. Players may hold more than one non-FIFA nationality.

No.	Pos.	Nation	Player
11	MF	(Iran) IRN	Mohammadreza Mahdavi (from Free agent)
8	MF	(Iran) IRN	Saeid Ghadami (from Sanat Naft)
72	FW	(Iran) IRN	Hossein Hejazian (from Gol Gohar)
28	DF	(Iran) IRN	Masoud Mikaeili (from Free agent)

Out: Note: Flags indicate national team as defined under FIFA eligibility rules; some limited exceptions apply. Players may hold more than one non-FIFA nationality.

No.	Pos.	Nation	Player
7	MF	(Iran) IRN	Mohammadreza Almaskhaleh (to Sepidrood)

== Squad statistics ==
=== Appearances & goals ===
Last updated 10 May 2016

No.	Pos	Nat	Player	Total		Pro League		Hazi Cup	
No.	Pos	Nat	Player	Apps	Goals	Apps	Goals	Apps	Goals
1	GK	(Iran) IRN	Reza Mohammadi	26	0	26+0	0	0+0	0
2	MF	(Iran) IRN	Hossein Gohari	15	0	14+1	0	0+0	0
4	DF	(Iran) IRN	Behnam Asgharkhani	20	0	15+5	0	0+0	0
5	MF	(Iran) IRN	Armin Monfared Doust	18	0	16+2	0	0+0	0
6	MF	(Iran) IRN	Mohammad Rostami	30	2	30+0	2	0+0	0
7	FW	(Iran) IRN	Reza Almaskhane	3	0	2+1	0	0+0	0
8	DF	(Iran) IRN	Saeid Ghadami	10	0	5+5	0	0+0	0
9	MF	(Iran) IRN	Hadi Sohrabi	32	3	32+0	3	0+0	0
10	FW	(Iran) IRN	Saeid Mortazavi	26	2	20+6	2	0+0	0
11	FW	(Iran) IRN	Mohammad Reza Mahdavi	11	2	11+0	2	0+0	0
12	FW	(Iran) IRN	Milad Ghorbanzadeh	32	3	20+12	3	0+0	0
13	FW	(Iran) IRN	Mohammad Heydari	21	2	17+4	2	0+0	0
14	MF	(Iran) IRN	Mostafa Hajati	30	3	30+0	3	0+0	0
17	FW	(Iran) IRN	Mohammad Jafari	10	0	6+4	0	0+0	0
19	DF	(Iran) IRN	Mahyar Nouri	31	0	31+0	0	0+0	0
20	DF	(Iran) IRN	Mohammad Talebi	19	1	8+11	1	0+0	0
21	DF	(Iran) IRN	Mojtaba Farzampour	14	0	11+3	0	0+0	0
23	GK	(Iran) IRN	Milad Pourgholi	9	0	9+0	0	0+0	0
25	DF	(Iran) IRN	Mohammadreza Mehdizadeh	24	0	19+5	0	0+0	0
26	FW	(Iran) IRN	Saeed Talebi	27	2	16+11	2	0+0	0
27	DF	(Iran) IRN	Amirreza Ghamnak	12	0	9+3	0	0+0	0
28	DF	(Iran) IRN	Masoud Mikaeili	3	0	3+0	0	0+0	0
29	MF	(Iran) IRN	Hafez Yaghoubi	24	1	3+21	1	0+0	0
33	GK	(Iran) IRN	Ashkan Tavana	2	0	2+0	0	0+0	0
34	MF	(Iran) IRN	Soheyl Hasangholi	0	0	0+0	0	0+0	0
40	FW	(Iran) IRN	Hassan Najafi	30	5	27+3	5	0+0	0
44	GK	(Iran) IRN	Reza Gholampour	0	0	0+0	0	0+0	0
72	MF	(Iran) IRN	Hossein Hejazian	9	1	7+2	1	0+0	0
77	FW	(Iran) IRN	Hamid Khodabandelou	26	2	19+7	2	0+0	0

== See also ==
- 2015–16 Azadegan League
