= 2008 Hazfi Cup final =

- Event: 2007-08 Hazfi Cup
Pegah Gilan	Esteghlal Tehran
1	3

First leg
Pegah Gilan	Esteghlal Tehran
1	0
- Date: Jun 09, 2008
- Venue: Sardar Jangal Stadium, Rasht
- Referee: Mozafarizadeh
- Attendance: 20,000

Second leg
Esteghlal Tehran	Pegah Gilan
3	0
- Date: Jun 16, 2008
- Venue: Azadi Stadium, Tehran
- Referee: Hedayat Mombeini
- Attendance: 100,000

The 2008 Hazfi Cup final was a two-legged football tie in order to determine the 2007–08 Hazfi Cup champion of Iranian football clubs. Esteghlal Tehran faced Pegah Gilan in this final game. The first leg took place on June 9, 2008, at 17:30 local time (UTC+3:30) at Sardar Jangal Stadium in Rasht, and the second leg took place on June 16, 2008, at 17:00 local time (UTC+3:30) at Azadi Stadium, Tehran.

== Format ==
The rules for the final were exactly the same as the one in the previous knockout rounds. The tie was contested over two legs with away goals deciding the winner if the two teams were level on goals after the second leg. If the teams could still not be separated at that stage, then extra time would have been played with a penalty shootout (taking place if the teams were still level after extra time).

== Route to the final ==
Esteghlal				Round	Pegah
Opponent	Result	H/A	Esteghlal goalscorers	Second stage	Opponent	Result	H/A	Pegah goalscorers
Tarbiat Badani Yazd	5–3	H	Mohsen Yousefi, Arash Borhani, Mohammad Navazi	1/16 Final	Mes Sarcheshmeh	3–0	H	Mohammad Sharif (o.g), Ebrahim Taghipour, Amin Motevaselzadeh
Zob Ahan	1–1 (3-1)	A	Arash Borhani	1/8 Final	Sanaye Arak	1–0	A	Alireza Nazifkar
Rah Ahan	2–2 (5-3)	H	Farhad Majidi (2)	Quarter-Final	Sepahan	4–2	H	Mehdi Noori, Afshin Chavoshi (2), Hadi Sohrabi
Foolad	1–1 (4-2)	A	Ali Alizadeh	Semi-Final	Bargh Shiraz	2–1	H	Hossein Maleki, Amin Motevaselzadeh

== Final ==
Team 1	Agg.	Team 2	1st leg	2nd leg
Pegah	1-3 (a.e.t.)	Esteghlal	1-0	0-3

=== Leg 1 ===
2008-06-09
17:30 (UTC+3:30)

Pegah	1 – 0	Esteghlal
Gilauri 40'

Sardar Jangal Stadium, Rasht
Attendance: 20,000
Referee: Mozafarizadeh

Pegah:
GK	22	(Iran) Ali Nazarmohammadi	Sent to blood bin	(substituted off) 76'
DF	33	(Georgia (country)) Akvsenti Gilauri	39'
DF		(Iran) Ebrahim Taghipour
DF	20	(Iran) Mohammad Mokhtari
DF		(Cameroon) William Djongo
MF		(Cameroon) Martin Abena
MF		(Iran) Mehdi Noori
MF		(Iran) Hadi Sohrabi		(substituted off) 57'
MF	11	(Iran) Mohammad Reza Mahdavi
FW	10	(Iran) Afshin Chavoshi		(substituted off) 85'
FW		(Iran) Hossein Ebrahimi
Substitutes:
GK		(Iran) Rasol Zamani		(substituted on) 76'
FW		(Iran) Amin Motevaselzadeh		(substituted on) 57'
MF		(Iran) Hossein Maleki		(substituted on) 85'
Manager:
(Iran) Nader Dastneshan

Esteghlal:
GK	1	(Iran) Vahid Talebloo
DF	(Iran) Amir Hossein Sadeghi
DF	(Iran) Pirouz Ghorbani	Temporarily suspended
DF	(Iran) Bijan Koushki
DF	(Iran) Pejman Montazeri
MF	(Iran) Omid Ravankhah
MF	(Iran) Mohammad Navazi	(substituted off) 83'
MF	(Iran) Meysam Maniei
FW	(Iran) Farhad Majidi	(substituted off) 53'
FW	(Iran) Ali Alizadeh
FW	(Iran) Mohsen Bayatinia	(substituted off) 46'
Substitutes:
DF	(Iran) Mehdi Amirabadi	(substituted on) 83'
MF	(Iran) Mohsen Yousefi	Temporarily suspended	(substituted on) 53'
FW	(Iran) Arash Borhani	(substituted on) 46'
Manager:
(Iran) Amir Ghalenoei

=== Leg 2 ===
2008-06-16
17:00 (UTC+3:30)

Esteghlal	3 – 0^{(a.e.t.)}	Pegah
Mehdi Amirabadi 15'; Mojtaba Jabari 95'; Arash Borhani 99'

Azadi Stadium, Tehran
Attendance: 100,000
Referee: Hedayat Mombeini

Esteghlal:
GK	1	(Iran) Vahid Talebloo
DF	(Iran) Amir Hossein Sadeghi	(yellow card) 110' (yellow-red card)
DF	(Iran) Mehdi Amirabadi	15'
DF	(Iran) Bijan Koushki	Temporarily suspended
DF	(Iran) Pirouz Ghorbani	Temporarily suspended
DF	(Iran) Pejman Montazeri
MF	(Iran) Omid Ravankhah
MF	(Iran) Meysam Maniei	(substituted off) 78'
MF	(Iran) Mojtaba Jabari	95'	(substituted off) 116'
FW	(Iran) Ali Alizadeh
FW	(Iran) Farhad Majidi	(substituted off) 73'
Substitutes:
MF	(Iran) Mohsen Yousefi	(substituted on) 78'
MF	(Iran) Ali Reza Mansourian	(substituted on) 116'
FW	(Iran) Arash Borhani	99'	(substituted on) 73'
Manager:
(Iran) Amir Ghalenoei

Pegah:
GK	22	(Iran) Ali Nazarmohammadi
DF	(Iran) Ebrahim Taghipour
DF	20	(Iran) Mohammad Mokhtari
DF	(Cameroon) William Djongo	Temporarily suspended
DF	33	(Georgia (country)) Akvsenti Gilauri
MF	11	(Iran) Mohammad Reza Mahdavi
MF	(Cameroon) Martin Abena	(substituted off) 113'
MF	(Iran) Mehdi Noori
FW	(Iran) Hossein Ebrahimi
FW	(Iran) Amin Motevaselzadeh	(substituted off) 78'
FW	10	(Iran) Afshin Chavoshi	(substituted off) 61'
Substitutes:
FW	(Iran) Saeed Pirsarandib	(substituted on) 113'
DF	(Iran) Masoud Mikaeli	(substituted on) 78'
MF	(Iran) Hossein Maleki	(substituted on) 91'
Manager:
(Iran) Nader Dastneshan

== Champions ==
Champions 2007–08 Hazfi Cup

Fifth title

== See also ==
- 2007–08 Persian Gulf Cup
- 2007–08 Azadegan League
- 2007–08 Iran Football's 2nd Division
- 2007–08 Iran Football's 3rd Division
- 2007–08 Hazfi Cup
- Iranian Super Cup
- 2007–08 Iranian Futsal Super League
