= Dejan Maksić =

Serbian footballer

Personal information
- Full name: Dejan Maksić
- Date of birth: September 20, 1975 (age 51)
- Place of birth: SFR Yugoslavia
- Height: 1.85 m (6 ft 1 in)
- Position: Goalkeeper

Senior career*
Years	Team	Apps	(Gls)
- Mačva Šabac
1997–1998	Čukarički	3	(0)
2000–2003	Čukarički	89	(0)
2003–2005	Pegah		
2005	Čukarički		
2005	CSKA Sofia	15	(0)
2006	Samsunspor	4	(0)
2008	Floriana	12	(0)

Managerial career
- 2020: Inđija (gk coach)
- 2022-: Kolubara (gk coach)
- * Club domestic league appearances and goals

Dejan Maksić (Serbian: Дејан Максић; born September 20, 1975) is a Serbian retired footballer who played for Floriana in the 2008–09 Maltese Premier League.

== Career ==
Maksić played as a goalkeeper for Pegah Gilan, FK Čukarički, PFC CSKA Sofia and Samsunspor before signing for Floriana F.C. He boasts of UEFA Champions League experience with CSKA Sofia. In the UEFA Champions League qualifying match CSKA Sofia defeated Liverpool 0-1 in Anfield with Maksić between the posts. In January 2006, he left for Samsunspor, with Oliver Kovačević move to opposite direction.

With Floriana, Maksić played 12 matches and kept 6 clean sheets, recording 6 wins, 3 draws and 3 defeats.

He ended his career because knee injury (2009).

== Personal life ==
He is married and has five children (Mina, Sara, David, Maksim, Dunja).
