= Mostafa Hajati =

Iranian footballer

Personal information
- Date of birth: June 22, 1983 (age 43)
- Place of birth: Rasht, Iran
- Position: Midfielder

Team information
- Current team: Damash Gilan
- Number: 23

Senior career*
Years	Team	Apps	(Gls)
- Esteghlal Rasht
2002–2008	Pegah Gilan		
2008–2014	Damash Gilan	122	(9)
2014–2015	Sepidrood Rasht	13	(2)
2015–	Damash Gilan	30	(3)

Managerial career
- 2019: Shahrdari Fouman
- * Club domestic league appearances and goals

Mostafa Hajati (Persian: مصطفی حاجتی, born 22 June 1983) is an Iranian professional football player who currently plays for Damash Gilan in the Azadegan League.

Hajati has spent the majority of his career at Damash. In 2014, after six seasons with Damash, he joined Sepidrood in 2nd Division where he spent one season until rejoining his former club S.C. Damash.

== Club statistics ==
As of 16 May 2016

Club performance			League		Cup		Total	
Season	Club	League	Apps	Goals	Apps	Goals	Apps	Goals
Iran			League		Hazfi Cup		Total	
2007–08	Pegah	Pro League	24	1	1	0	25	1
2008–09	Damash	Pro League	15	0	0	0	15	0
2009–10	Damash	Azadegan League	12	3	3	0	15	0
2010–11	Damash	Azadegan League	12	2	2	0	14	2
2011–12	Damash	Pro League	27	0			28	1
2012–13	Damash	Pro League	29	2	2	0	31	2
2013–14	Damash	Pro League	27	2	1	0	28	2
2014–15	Sepidrood	2nd Division	13	2	–	–	20^{1}	2
2015–16	Damash	Azadegan League	30	3	–	–	30	3
Total			190	15				

^{1} includes seven matches in 2014–15 Iran Football 2nd Division Second Round.
