= Martin Abena =

Cameroonian footballer (born 1986)

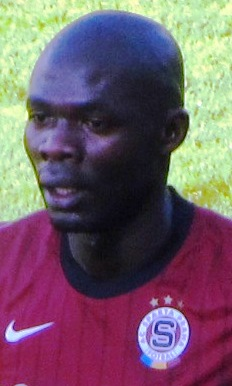
- Abena in 2011

Personal information
- Full name: Martin Achille Abena Biholong
- Date of birth: 14 June 1986 (age 40)
- Place of birth: Yaoundé, Cameroon
- Height: 1.90 m (6 ft 3 in)
- Position: Midfielder

Senior career*
Years	Team	Apps	(Gls)
2004–2005	Raon-l'Etape		
2007–2008	Pegah Gilan	11	(0)
2008	Dunajská Streda	30	(2)
2009	Skoda Xanthi	23	(0)
2010–2011	Dunajská Streda	10	(0)
2011–2012	Sparta Prague	7	(0)
2012–2013	PFC Lokomotiv Sofia	25	(6)
2013–2014	Selangor		
2014–2015	FK Čáslav		
2015	Loko Vltavín		
- * Club domestic league appearances and goals

Martin Achille Abena Biholong (born 14 June 1986) is a Cameroonian former professional footballer who played as a midfielder.
