= Abouzar Rahimi =

Iranian footballer

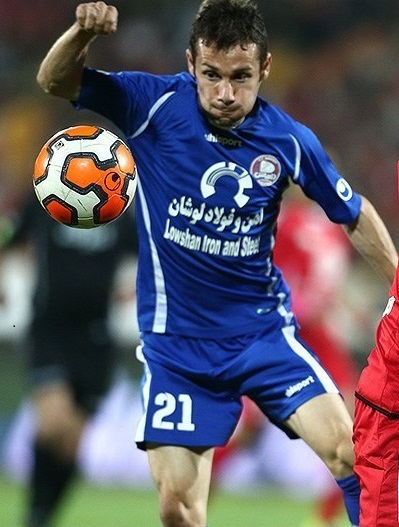
- Rahimi in 2013.

Personal information
- Full name: Abouzar Rahimi
- Date of birth: 17 September 1981 (age 45)
- Place of birth: Kordkuy, Golestan, Iran
- Positions: Left back; left midfielder

Senior career*
Years	Team	Apps	(Gls)
2000–2006	Shamoushak		
2006–2007	Foolad	29	(0)
2007–2011	Rah Ahan	119	(0)
2011–2012	Damash Gilan	33	(0)
2012	Sanat Naft	15	(0)
2012–2014	Damash Gilan	35	(0)
2014–2015	Etka Gorgan	6	(0)
2015–2016	Sepidrood Rasht	0	(0)

International career^{‡}
2010	Iran	0	(0)
- * Club domestic league appearances and goals as of October 23, 2013 (UTC) ‡ National team caps and goals as of June 1, 2010

Abouzar Rahimi (born September 17, 1981) is an Iranian former footballer.

== Club career ==
Rahimi started his football career with Shamoushak Golestan before moving to Shamoushak Noshahr. He was part of Shamoushak when the team was promoted to the Pro League in 2003, staying there for 5 seasons, before joining Foolad in 2006 after Shamoushak's relegation to Division 1. After spending four seasons at Rah Ahan he played for Damash Gilan in two separate stints, Sanat Naft Abadan for half a season, and Etka Gorgan, before retiring at Sepidrood Rasht in 2016.

Club	Season	League			Hazfi Cup		Total	
Club	Season	Division	Apps	Goals	Apps	Goals	Apps	Goals
Shamoushak	2004–05	Pro League	26	1				
Shamoushak	2005–06	Pro League	26	1				
Foolad	2006–07	Pro League	29	0	2	0	31	0
Rah Ahan	2007–08	Pro League	29	0				
Rah Ahan	2008–09	Pro League	31	0				
Rah Ahan	2009–10	Pro League	28	0	0	0	15	0
Rah Ahan	2010–11	Pro League	31	0	0	0	31	0
Damash	2011–12	Pro League	33	0	1	0	34	0
Sanat Naft	2012–13	Pro League	15	0	0	0	15	0
Damash	2012–13	Pro League	13	0	2	0	15	0
Damash	2013–14	Pro League	22	0	1	0	23	0
Career total			280	2				
