= Mohammad Mokhtari (footballer) =

Iranian footballer

Mohammamd Mokhtari
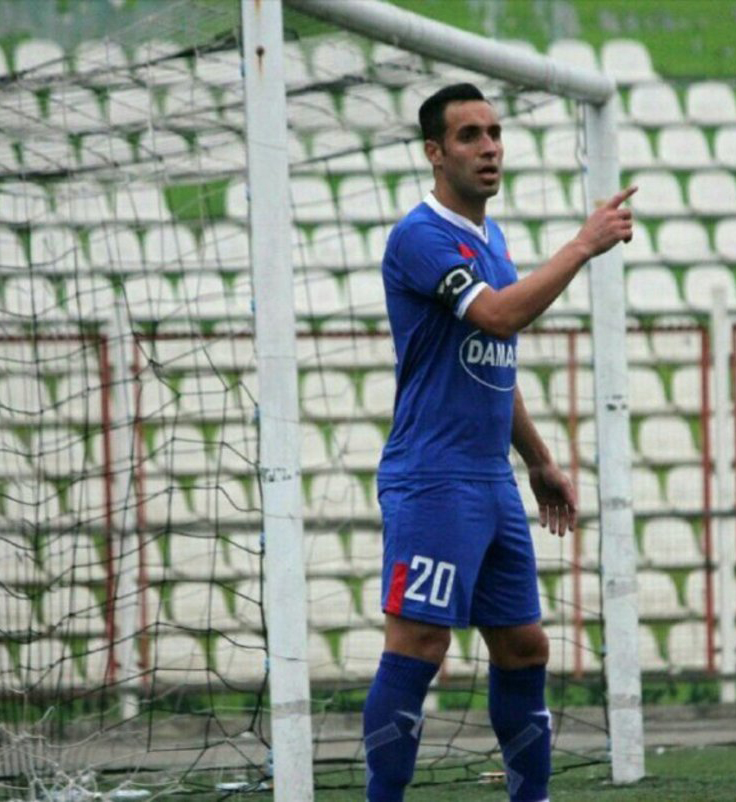

Personal information
- Full name: Mohammad Mokhatri
- Date of birth: 26 January 1984 (age 42)
- Place of birth: Shahsavar, Iran
- Position: Centre back

Team information
- Current team: Damash Guilan

Youth career
- 1997–2002: Shamoushak

Senior career*
Years	Team	Apps	(Gls)
2002–2007	Shamoushak		
2007–2008	Pegah	29	(1)
2008–2014	Damash Guilan	105	(4)
2014	Gostaresh	5	(0)
2015–2016	Mes Kerman	7	(0)
2016–	Damash Guilan	0	(0)
- * Club domestic league appearances and goals as of 16 July 2016

Mohammad Mokhtari (Persian: محمد مختاری; born 26 January 1984) is an Iranian football defender who currently plays for League 2 (Iran) club Damash Guilan.

== Career ==
Mokhtari started his career with Shamoushak in 2002 when he promoted to first team squad by the coach Akbar Misaghian. in 2007 he joined Pegah. After Dissolution Pegah in 2008, he joined newly founded club, Damash. He extended his contract with Damash in June 2012. In 2014 after six years and 105 appearances with Damash, Mokhtari signed with Gostaresh.

== Club career statistics ==
As of 16 March 2015

Club performance			League		Cup		Total	
Season	Club	League	Apps	Goals	Apps	Goals	Apps	Goals
Iran			League		Hazfi Cup		Total	
2007–08	Pegah	Pro League	29	1	6	0	35	1
2008–09	Damash	Pro League	25	0	0	0	25	0
2009–10	Damash	1st Division	19	1	3	0	22	1
2010–11	Damash	1st Division	3	0	2	1	5	1
2011–12	Damash	Pro League	16	0	1	0	17	0
2012–13	Damash	Pro League	20	1	2	0	22	1
2013–14	Damash	Pro League	22	1	1	0	23	1
2014–15	Gostaresh	Pro League	5	0	0	0	5	0
2014–15	Mes Kerman	1st Division	7	0	–	–	7	0
Career total			146	4	15	1	161	5
