= Saeed Hallafi =

Iranian footballer

Personal information
- Full name: Saeed Hallafi
- Date of birth: 23 April 1990 (age 36)
- Place of birth: Ahvaz, Iran
- Height: 1.78 m (5 ft 10 in)
- Positions: Deep-lying striker; winger

Youth career
- Foolad
- Esteghlal Ahvaz
- 2004–2007: Navard Va Louleh Ahvaz
- 2008: PAS Hamedan
- 2009–2011: Persepolis

Senior career*
| Years | Team | Apps | (Gls) |
| 2007–2008 | Sanat Naft | 10 | (2) |
| 2008 | PAS Hamedan | 0 | (0) |
| 2008–2009 | Sanat Naft | 12 | (6) |
| 2009–2011 | Persepolis | 1 | (0) |
| 2009–2010 | → Rah Ahan (loan) | 0 | (0) |
| 2011–2012 | Machine Sazi | 0 | (0) |
| 2012 | Sanat Naft | 20 | (2) |
| 2012–2013 | Damash | 13 | (3) |
| 2013–2014 | Paykan | 10 | (1) |
| 2014–2016 | Niroo Zamini | | |
| 2016 | Pars Jonoubi Jam | | |
| 2017 | Saba Qom | 0 | (0) |
| 2018 | Naft Al-Wasat | | |
| 2019 | Al-Hudood | | |
| 2019 | Malavan | | |

International career
| 2006 | Iran U17 | 0 | (0) |
| 2007–2008 | Iran U20 | 3 | (0) |
| 2009–2012 | Iran U23 | | |
- * Club domestic league appearances and goals as of 01:13, 25 January 2020 (UTC)

Saeed Hallafi (Persian: سعید حلافی; born 23 April 1990 in Ahvaz) is an Iranian footballer who currently plays as winger for Malavan in Azadegan League.

== Club career ==
He started his professional career in Sanat Naft he famously scored two goals in the Azadi Stadium against Esteghlal Tehran as a 17 years old helping his team win 2–3 away from home. He moved to Pas but did not play any match. He moved back to Sanat Naft for the next season in First Division.

He joined Pesepolis in 2009 for two years deal but in the first half-season he did not play a single match for them; then he was loaned to Rah Ahan until the end of 2009–2010 season. In the next season he only had 3 starts for Persepolis but scored a winning goal against Damash at round-16 of Hazfi Cup. In the beginning of 2012 he moved back to Sanat Naft once again but later in December 2012 he was fired from Sanat Naft. After he terminated his contract with Sanat, when everyone thought he will be joining Malavan instead he signed a two and half years deal with Damash Gilan on the last day of transfer window.

Perspolis

2007 Sanat Naft pas hamadan 2009 Sanat Naft 2011 perspolis 2012 mashin Sazi 2013 Damash

2014 peykan 2016 pars jonobi jam 2017 Saba qom 2018 Naft Al-wasat 2019 malavan

| 2007–2008 | Sanat Naft | 15 | (3) |
| 2008 | PAS Hamedan | 0 | (0) |
| 2008–2009 | Sanat Naft | 12 | (6) |
| 2009–2011 | Persepolis | 11 | (0) |
| 2009–2010 | → Rah Ahan (loan) | 7 | (0) |
| 2011–2012 | Machine Sazi | 0 | (0) |
| 2012 | Sanat Naft | 20 | (2) |
| 2012–2013 | Damash | 13 | (3) |
| 2013–2014 | Paykan | 10 | (1) |
| 2014–2016 | Niroo Zamini | | |
| 2016 | Pars Jonoubi Jam | | |
| 2017 | Saba Qom | 0 | (0) |
| 2018 | Naft Al-Wasat | | |
| 2019 | Al-Hudood | | |
| 2019 | Malavan | | |

=== Club career statistics ===
As of 9 August 2013

| Club performance | | | League | | Cup | | Continental | | Total | |
| Season | Club | League | Apps | Goals | Apps | Goals | Apps | Goals | Apps | Goals |
| Iran | | | League | | Hazfi Cup | | Asia | | Total | |
|---|---|---|---|---|---|---|---|---|---|---|
| 2007–08 | Sanat Naft | Pro League | 15 | 3 | | | - | - | 15 | 3 |
| 2008–09 | PAS | Pro League | 0 | 0 | | | - | - | 0 | 0 |
| 2008–09 | Sanat Naft | Division 1 | 12 | 6 | | | - | - | 12 | 6 |
| 2009–10 | Persepolis | Pro League | 0 | 0 | 0 | 0 | - | - | 0 | 0 |
| 2009–10 | Rah Ahan | Pro League | 7 | 0 | | | - | - | 7 | 0 |
| 2010–11 | Persepolis | Pro League | 11 | 0 | 2 | 1 | 0 | 0 | 13 | 1 |
| 2011–2012 | Machine Sazi | Division 1 | 0 | 0 | 0 | 0 | - | - | 0 | 0 |
| 2011–2012 | Sanat Naft | Pro League | 9 | 1 | 0 | 0 | - | - | 9 | 1 |
| 2012–13 | Sanat Naft | Pro League | 11 | 1 | 2 | 0 | - | - | 13 | 1 |
| 2012–13 | Damash | Pro League | 12 | 3 | 1 | 0 | - | - | 13 | 3 |
| 2013–14 | Damash | Pro League | 2 | 0 | 0 | 0 | - | - | 2 | 0 |
| Career total | | | 79 | 14 | 5 | 1 | 0 | 0 | 82 | 15 |

- Assist Goals

| Season | Team | Assists |
|---|---|---|
| 09-10 | Rah Ahan | 1 |
| 10-11 | Persepolis | 0 |
| 11-12 | Sanat Naft | 1 |

National team
| 2006 | Iran U17 | 0 | (0) |
| 2007–2008 | Iran U20 | 3 | (0) |
| 2009–2010 | Iran U23 | | |

== Honours ==
Persepolis

- Hazfi Cup (1): 2010–11
