= Mohsen Azarbad =

Iranian footballer (born 1989)

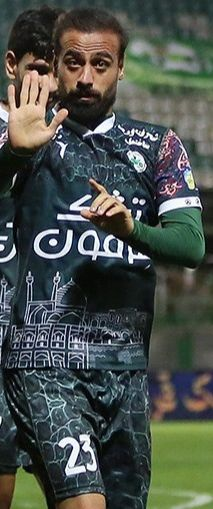

Personal information
- Date of birth: 12 November 1989 (age 36)
- Place of birth: Tehran, Iran
- Height: 1.82 m (6 ft 0 in)
- Position: Winger

Team information
- Current team: Zob Ahan
- Number: 23

Senior career*
Years	Team	Apps	(Gls)
2012–2013	Aboomoslem	19	(2)
2013–2014	Naft Abadan	18	(2)
2014–2015	Pas Hamedan	33	(7)
2016	Naft Masjed Soleyman	14	(4)
2016	Mes Rafsanjan	9	(0)
2017	Siah Jamegan	13	(1)
2017	Nassaji Mazandaran	1	(0)
2017–2019	Gol Gohar	40	(5)
2019–2024	Mes Rafsanjan	129	(10)
2024–	Zob Ahan	40	(3)
- * Club domestic league appearances and goals as of 11 April 2025

Mohsen Azarbad (Persian: محسن آذرباد; born 12 November 1989) is an Iranian professional footballer who plays as a winger for Persian Gulf Pro League club Zob Ahan.
