= Mehdi Mohammadzadeh =

Iranian footballer

Personal information
- Date of birth: 21 May 1984 (age 42)
- Place of birth: Karaj, Iran
- Height: 1.76 m (5 ft 9 in)
- Position: Midfielder

Team information
- Current team: Shahin Bandar Ameri (assistant coach)

Senior career*
Years	Team	Apps	(Gls)
2006–2007	Bargh Tehran		
2007–2008	Homa	24	(1)
2008–2009	Aboomoslem	8	(0)
2009–2011	Naft Tehran	53	(6)
2011–2012	Shahrdari Tabriz	11	(1)
2012–2013	Aluminium Hormozgan	20	(0)
2013–2014	Foolad Yazd	12	(0)
2014–2015	Shahin Kish		
2015–2016	Mantaghe Azad		
2016–2018	PAS Hamedan		
2018–2019	Shohadaye Razakan Alborz		

Managerial career
- 2021–2023: Shohadaye Razakan Alborz (assistant)
- 2023: Shohadaye Razakan Alborz
- 2024: Shohadaye Razakan Alborz (assistant)
- 2024–: Shahin Bandar Ameri (assistant)
- * Club domestic league appearances and goals

Mehdi Mohammadzadeh (Persian: مهدی محمدزاده; born 21 May 1984) is an Iranian football coach and a former player who is an assistant coach with Shahin Bandar Ameri.

== Club career ==
Mohammadzadeh moved to Naft Tehran F.C. in 2009 after spending the previous season with Aboomoslem of the Iran Pro League.

Club performance			League		Cup		Continental		Total	
Season	Club	League	Apps	Goals	Apps	Goals	Apps	Goals	Apps	Goals
Iran			League		Hazfi Cup		Asia		Total	
2007–08	Homa	Division 1	24	1			-	-		
2008–09	Aboomoslem	Pro League	8	0			-	-		
2009–10	Naft Tehran	Division 1	26	3			-	-		
2010–11	Naft Tehran	Pro League	27	3			-	-		
2011–12	Shahrdari Tabriz	Pro League	12	1			-	-		
2012–13	Aluminium	Pro League	0	0	0	0	-	-	0	0
Career total			97	8			0	0		

- Assists

Season	Team	Assists
10–11	Naft Tehran	0
11–12	Shahrdari Tabriz	0
