= Rasoul Pirzadeh =

Iranian footballer

Personal information
- Full name: Rasoul Pirzadeh
- Date of birth: 2 November 1982 (age 43)
- Place of birth: Tabriz, Iran
- Position: Midfielder

Team information
- Current team: PAS
- Number: 23

Senior career*
Years	Team	Apps	(Gls)
2009–2012	Shahrdari Tabriz	57	(2)
2012–2013	Aluminium	30	(3)
2013–2015	Gostaresh	23	(0)
2015–	PAS	8	(0)
- * Club domestic league appearances and goals as of october 2015 (UTC)

Rasoul Pirzadeh (born November 2, 1982) is an Iranian footballer who plays for PAS Hamedan F.C. in the Azadegan League.

== Club career ==
Pirzadeh played for Shahrdari Tabriz from 2009 to 2012. He also played for Aluminium Hormozgan for one season.
