= Ali Nazifkar =

Iranian footballer

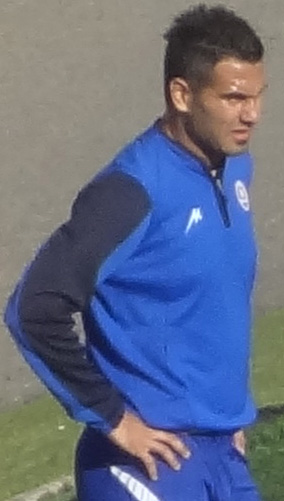
- Nazifkar in 2012

Personal information
- Full name: Alireza Nazifkar
- Date of birth: 2 February 1984 (age 42)
- Place of birth: Rasht, Iran
- Height: 1.88 m (6 ft 2 in)
- Position: Defender

Youth career
- Omid Saadi
- Fajr Gilan
- Esteghlal Shomal Tehran
- Kowsar Tehran
- Pegah

Senior career*
Years	Team	Apps	(Gls)
2005–2008	Pegah	48	(2)
2008–2009	Damash Gilan	13	(1)
2009–2010	Nassaji	22	(0)
2010–2014	Damash Gilan	108	(17)
2014–2015	Mes Kerman	8	(1)
2015–2016	Khoneh Be Khoneh	18	(4)
2016	Damash Gilan		
2017	Sepidrood		
2019	Shahrdari Fuman		

International career
2007	Iran U23	6	(0)

Managerial career
- 2022–2023: Damash Gilan (assistant)
- 2024–2025: Sepidrood (assistant)
- * Club domestic league appearances and goals

Alireza Niknazar (Persian: علیرضا نظیف کار; born 2 February 1984) is an Iranian football coach and a former defender.

== Club career statistics ==
He played all his career for his hometown teams Pegah and Damash Gilan except one season (2009–10) at Nassaji.

== Career statistics ==
As of 8 January 2016

Club statistics
Season	Club	League	League		Cup		Total	
Season	Club	League	App	Goals	App	Goals	App	Goals
2006–07	Pegah	Azadegan League	14	0	0	0	14	0
2007–08	Pegah	Iran Pro League	29	1	2	1	31	2
2008–09	Damash Gilan	Iran Pro League	13	1	0	0	13	1
2009–10	Nassaji	Azadegan League	22	0	0	0	22	0
2010–11	Damash Gilan	Azadegan League	22	5	2	0	24	5
2011–12	Damash Gilan	Iran Pro League	28	5	1	0	29	5
2012–13	Damash Gilan	Iran Pro League	31	3	3	0	34	3
2013–14	Damash Gilan	Iran Pro League	27	4	1	0	28	4
2014–15	Mes Kerman	Azadegan League	11	2	−	−	11	2
2015–16	Khoneh Be Khoneh	Azadegan League	10	2	−	−	10	2
Total			207	23	9	1	216	24
