= Hadi Sohrabi =

Iranian footballer

Personal information
- Date of birth: 2 February 1989 (age 37)
- Place of birth: Khomam, Iran
- Height: 1.87 m (6 ft 1 1/2 in)
- Position: Centre midfielder

Team information
- Current team: Damash
- Number: 8

Youth career
- Shahrdari Khomam
- Fajr Gilan

Senior career*
Years	Team	Apps	(Gls)
- Fajr Gilan
2007–2008	Pegah	17	(0)
2008–2011	Damash	22	(1)
2011–2012	Nassaji	13	(0)
2012–2018	Damash	117	(4)
2018–	Chooka Talesh	0	(0)

International career
2009	Iran U-23		
- * Club domestic league appearances and goals as of 16 May 2016

Hadi Sohrabi (Persian: هادی سهرایی; born 2 February 1989 in Khomam) is an Iranian football midfielder who currently plays for Damash in Iran's Premier Football League.

== Career ==
Sohrabi Started his career with Shahrdari Khomam. He started his senior career with Pegah Gilan under Nader Dastneshan management. He was a part of Damash until 2011. In Summer 2012 he joined Nassaji. After a season far from his city, he moved back to Damash. In 2014, he named as the club's captain of Damash after the departure of Mohammad Reza Mahdavi.

== Club career statistics ==
- Last update: 16 May 2016

Club performance			League		Cup		Total	
Season	Club	League	Apps	Goals	Apps	Goals	Apps	Goals
Iran			League		Hazfi Cup		Total	
2007–08	Pegah	Pro League	17	0	4	1	21	1
2008–09	Damash	Pro League	2	0	1	1	3	1
2009–10	Damash	Azadegan League	6	0	2	0	8	0
2010–11	Damash	Azadegan League	14	1	2	0	16	1
2011–12	Nassaji	Azadegan League	13	0	–	–	13	0
2012–13	Damash	Pro League	27	0	3	0	30	0
2013–14	Damash	Pro League	25	0	1	0	26	0
2014–15	Damash	Azadegan League	19	1	–	–	19	1
2015–16	Damash	Azadegan League	32	3	–	–	32	3
2016–17	Damash	2nd Division	14	1	1	0	15	1
Career total			169	6	14	2	183	8
