= Riyahi =

Riyahi (Arabic: رِيَاحِي [ALA-LC: Riyāḥī]; Persian: ریاحی Riyâhi), also variously rendered in English as Reyahi, Riahi, Riahy or Ryahi, or with the Arabic definite article ar-Riyahi (Arabic: الرِّيَاحِي [ALA-LC: al-Riyāḥī]), also rendered as Ereyahi, may refer to:

- al-Hurr ibn Yazid ar-Riyahi
- Reda Ereyahi
- Ali Riahi
- Djahanguir Riahi
- Mohammad-Amin Riahi
- Shahla Riahi
- Taghi Riahi
