= Alireza Jahanbakhsh =

Iranian footballer (born 1993)

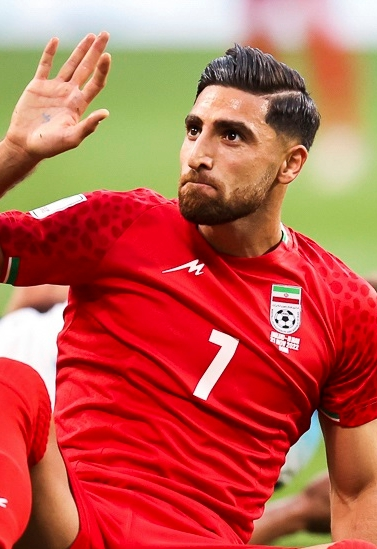
- Jahanbakhsh with Iran in the 2022 FIFA World Cup

Personal information
- Full name: Alireza Jahan Bakhsh Jirandeh
- Date of birth: 11 August 1993 (age 33)
- Place of birth: Jirandeh, Iran
- Height: 1.80 m (5 ft 11 in)
- Positions: Winger; attacking midfielder

Team information
- Current team: Excelsior
- Number: 11

Youth career
- 2005–2007: Payam Alborz Qazvin
- 2007–2008: Persian Qazvin
- 2008–2010: Damash Gilan

Senior career*
Years	Team	Apps	(Gls)
2010–2011	Damash Tehran	12	(0)
2011–2013	Damash Gilan	44	(10)
2013–2015	NEC	55	(17)
2015–2018	AZ Alkmaar	85	(34)
2018–2021	Brighton & Hove Albion	50	(2)
2021–2024	Feyenoord	71	(9)
2024–2025	SC Heerenveen	19	(3)
2025–2026	Dender EH	21	(1)
2026–	Excelsior	4	(0)

International career^{‡}
2010–2013	Iran U20	17	(11)
2011–2015	Iran U21	6	(1)
2013–	Iran	101	(17)
Medal record
Representing Iran
CAFA Nations Cup
Winner	2023 Kyrgyzstan – Uzbekistan	Team
Runner-up	2025 Tajikistan–Uzbekistan	Team
AFF U-19 Youth Championship
Winner	2012 Vietnam
- * Club domestic league appearances and goals as of 11 May 2026 ‡ National team caps and goals as of 06:40, 27 June 2026 (UTC)

Alireza Jahanbakhsh (Gilaki: علیرضا جهانبخش; born 11 August 1993) is an Iranian professional footballer who plays as a winger for Eredivisie club Excelsior and the Iran national team.

He began his professional career with Iranian side Damash Tehran in 2010. After moving to Dutch club NEC in 2013, Jahanbakhsh was voted the second greatest young talent of the 2013–14 Eredivisie season the following year. In the 2017–18 Eredivisie season, Jahanbakhsh scored 21 league goals, making him the first Asian player to become top scorer in a major European league.

In July 2018, he moved to English side Brighton & Hove Albion. After three seasons with the Seagulls, he returned to the Netherlands with Feyenoord, where he won the Eredivisie title in the 2022–23 season.

Internationally, Jahanbakhsh is a senior international and former youth international for Iran, making his senior debut for his country in October 2013. He represented the nation at four FIFA World Cups (2014, 2018, 2022 and 2026) and three AFC Asian Cups (in 2015, 2019 and 2023).

== Early life ==
Jahanbakhsh was born on 11 August 1993 in Jirandeh, a small city located in Rudbar County, Gilan Province. He grew up in Qazvin and is an ethnic Gilak.

== Club career ==
=== Damash ===
Jahanbakhsh played most of his youth in Rasht and Persian Qazvin before joining the youth academy of Damash Tehran in 2008. Jahanbaksh started his career in Tehran with Damash Tehran, an affiliate of Damash Gilan in the 2nd Division. In 2011, Jahanbakhsh returned to Gilan and at the age of 17. In 2011, Jahanbakhsh played his first game for Damash Gilan in the Iran Pro League against Mes as one of Damash's youngest ever players. Jahanbakhsh scored his first goal on 15 January 2012 in a 1–0 victory against Fajr. In 42 league appearances with Damash, he scored 10 goals.

=== NEC ===
==== 2013–14 season ====
Though he was expected to join Iranian giants, Persepolis, on 26 May 2013, Jahanbakhsh reached a verbal agreement with Dutch outfit NEC Nijmegen for a three-year deal. This deal was subject to a medical examination and obtaining a visa and work permit. He officially joined the club on 1 July 2013. He made his debut as a substitute in an Eredivisie match against FC Groningen on 3 August 2013. He scored his first goal in an 8–0 win over Harkemase Boys in the KNVB Cup. On 1 December 2013, Jahanbakhsh scored two goals and assisted the other in a 3–2 league match win over AZ Alkmaar. On 22 December, he scored and assisted at Groningen while providing a secondary assist on 15 February 2014 against RKC Waalwijk. On 22 March, when NEC were down 2–0 at half-time, Jahanbakhsh came on as a substitute after the half and provided an assist for Michael Higdon in their 2–2 draw at SC Heerenveen.

On the final day of the 2013–14 season, Jahanbakhsh scored two late goals against Ajax to save NEC from automatic relegation, instead securing a relegation playoff spot. Jahanbakhsh was originally voted the Eredivisie's greatest talent of the season before becoming runner-up to Memphis Depay.

==== 2014–15 season ====
On the opening day of the 2014–15 Jupiler League, Jahanbakhsh scored a goal in a 3–1 win against FC Eindhoven. On 29 August, he scored two goals and provided two assists in a 4–1 win at Helmond Sport. On 20 September, he scored against FC Emmen to help bring NEC to the top of the league table. Three days later, on 23 September, AJ scored a free kick in extra time and converted a penalty in their win against Ajax II at Amsterdam during the second round of the 2014–15 Dutch Cup. On 3 October, he scored a goal and provided an assist in a 2–1 win against Almere City to send NEC to the Eredivisie play-offs as quarter-season league champions. On 17 October 2014, Jahanbakhsh was named the Best Player of the First Period of the 2014–15 Jupiler League.

On 28 November, he opened the scoring with a volley and provided two assists in a 5–1 win over Jong Twente. On 1 February 2015, in his first game upon his return from the 2015 AFC Asian Cup, he scored a bicycle kick and was named man of the match in the 3–1 win over Helmond Sport. On 13 February, he scored a goal and provided two assists in a 3–2 win over FC Emmen with another goal against Achilles '29 days later to bring his tally to 4 goals in 5 consecutive matches after the Asian Cup.

At the end of the season, Jahanbakhsh was selected by fans as NEC's player of the season. On 12 May 2015, Jahanbakhsh was voted as the Eerste Divisie's best player for the 2014–15 season, with twelve goals and eighteen assists in the league.

=== AZ ===
==== 2015–16 season ====
On 3 August 2015, Jahanbakhsh signed a five-year contract with Dutch club AZ Alkmaar. He was given number nine as his jersey number, and made his Eredivisie debut for AZ on 12 September 2015, in a 3–1 win over De Graafschap. Jahanbakhsh made his UEFA Europa League debut in a 2–1 group stage win over Athletic Bilbao on 1 October 2015. Jahanbakhsh recorded his first assist for AZ on 21 November 2015, in a 3–1 victory against Heerenveen. Jahanbakhsh scored his first goal for AZ on 30 January 2016 in a match against his former club NEC. He scored his second goal of the season and also recorded his fourth assist on 13 February 2016 in a 6–3 victory over Heracles Almelo.

==== 2016–17 season ====
In June 2016, Jahanbakhsh switched from number 9 to number 7 for the upcoming 2016–17 season. On 2 July 2016, in AZ's first preseason match, Jahanbakhsh recorded a goal and an assist in his team's 5–1 victory. On 28 August, he scored his first goal of the season against FC Utrecht. The match ended 2–1, with Jahanbakhsh scoring the winning goal.

On 13 January 2017, Jahanbakhsh scored a brace and recorded an assist, as well as being named man of the match in a 3–1 victory against Go Ahead Eagles. On 21 August 2016, he scored his first goal of the season in a 2–1 win over Utrecht. On 16 February 2017, he scored his first ever European goal in a 4–1 loss to Lyon in Round of 32 of the Europa League.

Jahanbakhsh was named the best winger of the 2016–17 season in the Dutch League.

==== 2017–18 season ====
Jahanbakhsh scored a hat trick and recorded an assist on 18 April 2018 against Vitesse in the 2017–18 Eredivisie. Jahanbakhsh scored another hat trick on the last match day to become the leading goal scorer of the Eredivisie season with 21 goals, and also finished joint third with 12 assists. He became the first Asian player ever to become the top goalscorer in a top level European league.

=== Brighton & Hove Albion ===
==== 2018–19 season ====
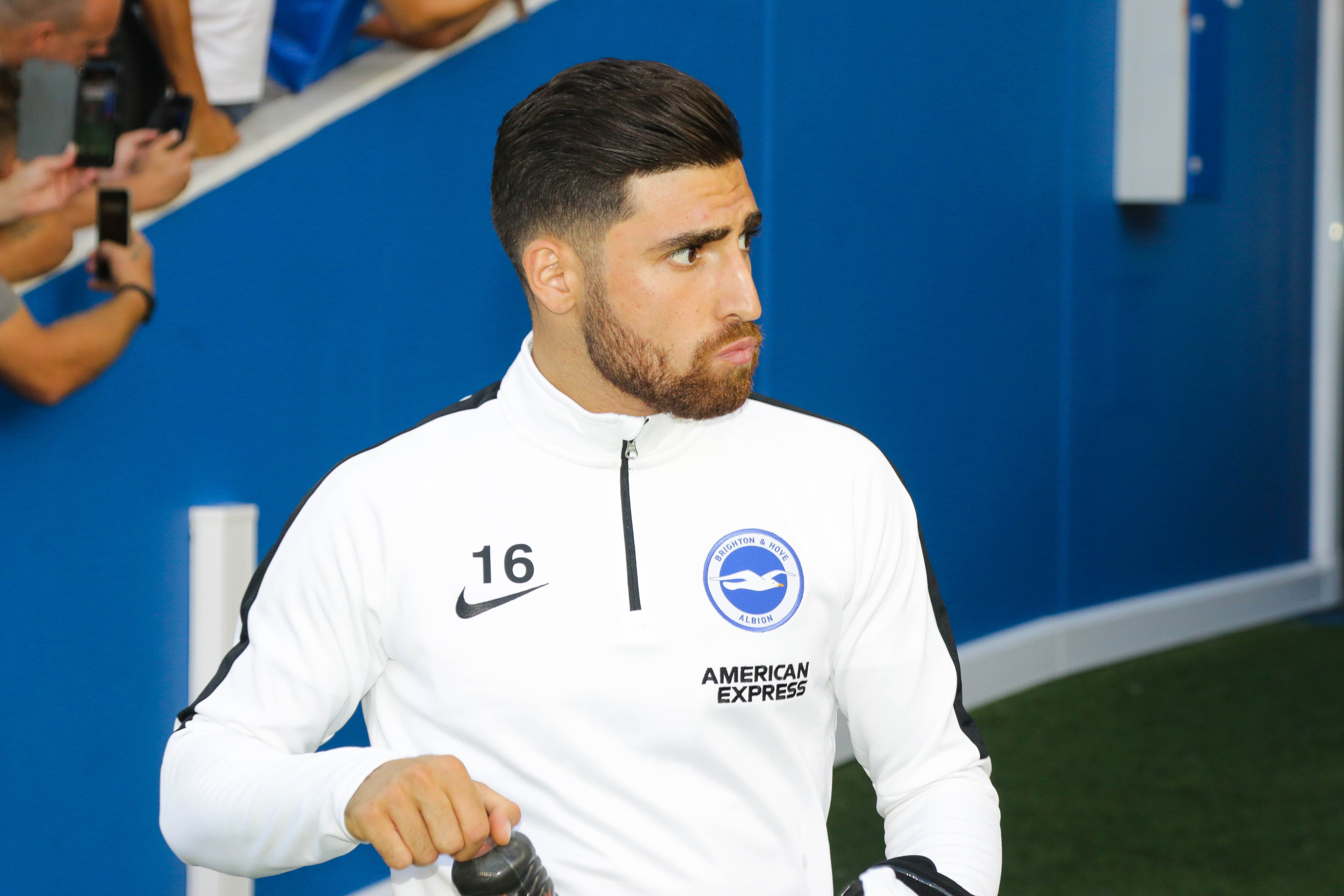
Jahanbakhsh with Brighton & Hove Albion in August 2018

On 25 July 2018, Jahanbakhsh transferred to Premier League side Brighton & Hove Albion for an undisclosed club record fee, signing a five-year contract. He announced on his Instagram account that he had chose to wear number 16, the same number he used to wear in his first season at NEC.

On 11 August 2018, Jahanbakhsh made his debut for Brighton as a substitute in the club's opening match of the Premier League season against Watford. Even though he played 25 matches in the season due to injuries and poor performance, he did not score any goals or provide any assists.

==== 2019–20 season ====
With the managerial change at Brighton with Graham Potter replacing Chris Hughton, Jahanbakhsh rarely found himself in the matchday squad until 8 December 2019, when he came on as a substitute in a match against Wolverhampton Wanderers. On 28 December, he scored his first goal for the club on his first start against Bournemouth. Jahanbakhsh was overcome with emotion and was seen crying after scoring his first ever goal for his club. On 1 January 2020, he scored an equalising bicycle kick goal for Brighton against Chelsea. The goal against Chelsea was later voted by people as the Premier League Goal of the Month for January, in which Jahanbakhsh described it as the best goal he has ever scored.

==== 2020–21 season ====
Jahanbakhsh came on as a substitute in Brighton's opening day of the season in a 3–1 home loss against Chelsea in the league. He scored in the next game, a 4–0 home thrashing over Portsmouth in the EFL Cup on 17 September. He scored again 6 days later again coming in the EFL Cup, this time a 2–0 away win over Preston. Jahanbakhsh started in Brighton's 3–2 home victory over champions Manchester City on 18 May 2021, with fans returning to football. Brighton came back from 2–0 down to secure their first win over The Sky Blues since 1989.

=== Feyenoord ===
On 17 July 2021, Feyenoord announced that Jahanbakhsh had joined the club on a three-year contract with an option for a fourth year. He made his debut for Feyenoord on 29 July in the second leg of the UEFA Europa Conference League tie against Kosovan club FC Drita, where he started the match but was later substituted in the 3–2 home victory, with Feyenoord also going through 3–2 on aggregate. He registered his first two goals for the club on 12 August, scoring Feyenoord's first two in a 3–0 win against FC Luzern in the third qualifying round of the 2021–22 UEFA Europa Conference League. Jahanbakhsh made his league debut for the Rotterdam side on 22 August, starting in a 2–0 home victory over Go Ahead Eagles.

=== SC Heerenveen ===
On 6 November 2024, Jahanbakhsh signed a contract with Dutch club SC Heerenveen until the end of the season.

=== FCV Dender ===
On 4 November 2025, after being a free agent for the start of the season, Jahanbakhsh joined a winless FCV Dender EH on a one-year deal with an option for an additional year. He made his debut for the Belgian club against Zulte Waregem on 7 November, coming off the bench in the 69th minute.

== International career ==
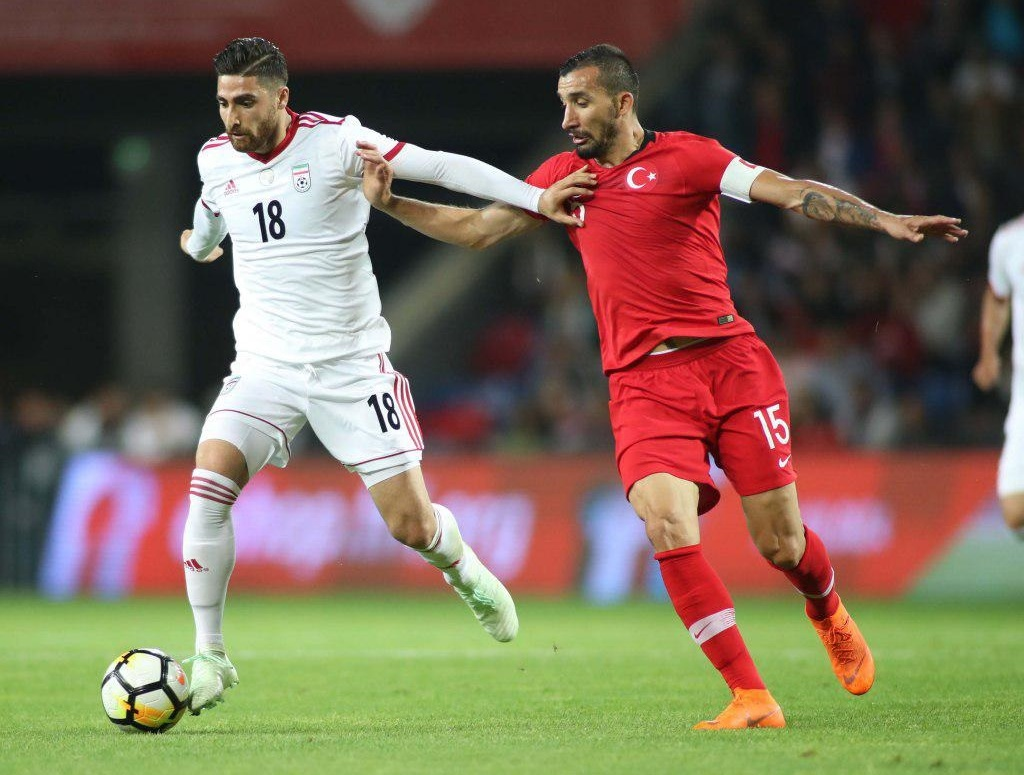
Jahanbakhsh playing for Iran in a friendly match against Turkey in 2018

=== Youth ===
Jahanbakhsh was part of the squad that played at the 2010 AFC U-19 Championship in China, playing in two games. Being only 16 at the start of the championships in 2010, he continued at the same age group, captaining the national under-20 team for their successful 2012 AFC U-19 Championship qualification by scoring 5 goals in four appearances. At the championships, he added two more to his tally against the United Arab Emirates and South Korea.

Jahanbakhsh was called into Iran's Olympic qualifiers in March 2015 and was named team captain. With the presence of Jahanbakhsh the under-23 team qualified to the 2016 AFC U-23 Championship in Qatar. As the 2016 AFC U-23 Championship was not held during the FIFA International Match Calendar, Jahanbakhsh was not released by AZ Alkmaar.

=== Senior team ===
On 5 October 2013, Jahanbakhsh was called up to Team Melli in a 2015 Asian Cup qualifier against Thailand by manager Carlos Queiroz, and he served his first cap as a substitute in the 82nd minute. His first national team goal came in his second game on 15 November in a 3–0 win at Thailand. On 1 June 2014, he was called into Iran's 2014 FIFA World Cup squad by Queiroz. He played in all three matches against Nigeria, Argentina and Bosnia and Herzegovina. He was called into Iran's 2015 AFC Asian Cup squad on 30 December 2014 by Queiroz.

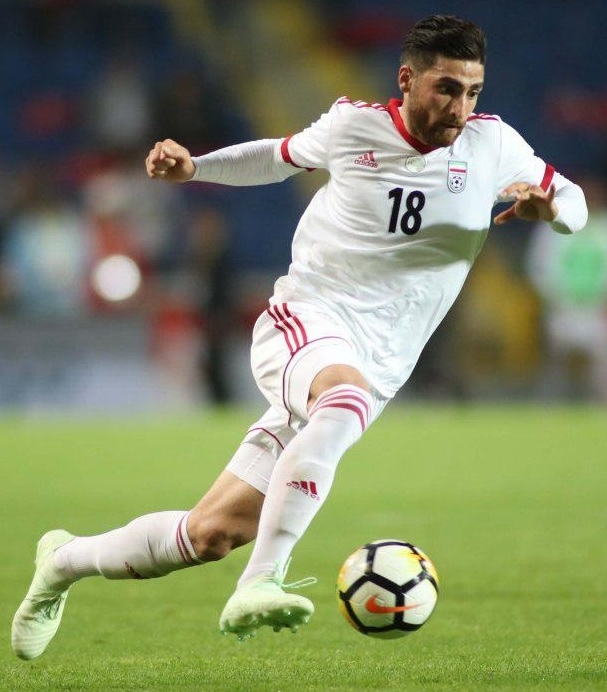
Jahanbaksh playing for Iran in a friendly against Turkey before the 2018 FIFA World Cup

In May 2018, Jahanbakhsh was named in Iran's squad for the 2018 FIFA World Cup in Russia. He played all three group matches against Morocco, Spain and Portugal.

In December 2018, Jahanbakhsh was selected for Iran's 23-man squad for the 2019 AFC Asian Cup. On 16 January 2019, he made his competitive debut in a 0–0 draw against Iraq in the last match of the group stage. In the latter match, he scored his first goal in the tournament in the 2–0 victory against Oman.

Jahanbakhsh was named in the 26-man Iran squad for the 2022 FIFA World Cup campaign. He played in Iran's first two games against England and Wales. In these games he accumulated two yellow cards which resulted in his suspension for Iran's final game of the tournament against the United States.

On 2 January 2024, he was named in the Iranian squad for the 2023 AFC Asian Cup. During the competition's quarter-finals against Japan, he converted a penalty in the stoppage time to grant his country a 2–1 victory and qualification to the semi-finals.

On 16 May 2026, Jahanbakhsh was selected in the 26-man squad for the 2026 FIFA World Cup. A month later, on 21 June, he made his 100th international appearance for Iran in a goalless draw with Belgium in the second group-stage match of the World Cup.

== Style of play ==
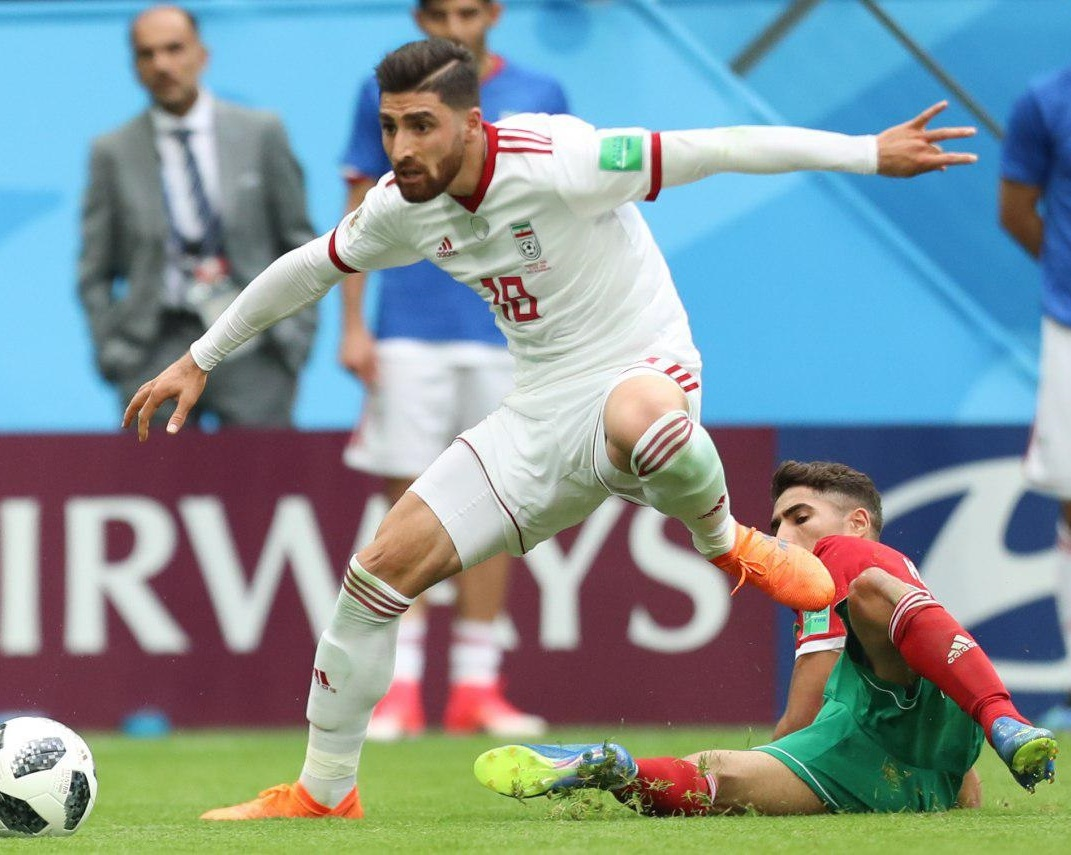
Jahanbaksh playing for Iran against Morocco in 2018 FIFA World Cup

Jahanbakhsh has been compared to former Iranian international player Mehdi Mahdavikia.

In several interviews, Jahanbakhsh revealed his life time dream is to play in Bundesliga, albeit there is huge interest in him from Italian and English sides declaring that as a kid he grew up watching his idols Ali Daei, Ali Karimi and Vahid Hashemian play for Bayern Munich and Mehdi Mahdavikia for Hamburger SV.

== Personal life ==
=== Social media ===
In January 2020, Jahanbakhsh said that he posted on Instagram a photo of Iranian major general Qasem Soleimani, who was assassinated by the US in the 2020 Baghdad International Airport airstrike, and that the post was later deleted.

On 4 January 2026, Jahanbakhsh publicly supported the 2025–2026 Iranian protests on his Instagram, stating: "I witnessed firsthand the very difficult living conditions and the economic pressure imposed on our people, feeling it with my skin and bones...A country with so much capital and talent, a noble and dignified people who have shown their patriotism all these years in the worst conditions of our country, Iran. All of this is a summary of the management weakness, rents, and embezzlement that have diminished the people's table and destroyed the aspirations of the youth of this border and land. Hoping for a bright future for our beloved Iran and the happiness of the beloved people of Iran."

=== Sponsorship ===
Jahanbakhsh is outfitted by German sportswear manufacturer Adidas.

== Career statistics ==
=== Club ===
As of match played 11 May 2026

Appearances and goals by club, season and competition
Club	Season	League			National cup (Note: Includes Iranian Hazfi Cup, KNVB Cup, FA Cup)		League cup (Note: Includes EFL Cup)		Continental		Other		Total	
Club	Season	Division	Apps	Goals	Apps	Goals	Apps	Goals	Apps	Goals	Apps	Goals	Apps	Goals
Damash Tehran	2010–11	Iranian 2nd Division	12	0	0	0	—		—		—		12	0
Damash Gilan	2011–12	Persian Gulf Pro League	16	2	2	0	—		—		—		18	2
Damash Gilan	2012–13	Persian Gulf Pro League	28	8	4	1	—		—		—		32	9
Damash Gilan	Total		44	10	6	1	—		—		—		50	11
NEC	2013–14	Eredivisie	27	5	4	1	—		—		2 (Note: Appearance(s) in Eredivisie play-offs)	0	33	6
NEC	2014–15	Eerste Divisie	28	12	3	1	—		—		—		31	13
NEC	Total		55	17	7	2	—		—		2	0	64	19
AZ	2015–16	Eredivisie	23	3	3	0	—		3 (Note: Appearances in UEFA Europa League)	0	—		29	3
AZ	2016–17	Eredivisie	29	10	4	0	—		9	1	1	1	43	12
AZ	2017–18	Eredivisie	33	21	6	1	—		—		—		39	22
AZ	Total		85	34	13	1	—		12	1	1	1	111	37
Brighton & Hove Albion	2018–19	Premier League	19	0	4	0	1	0	—		—		24	0
Brighton & Hove Albion	2019–20	Premier League	10	2	1	0	1	0	—		—		12	2
Brighton & Hove Albion	2020–21	Premier League	21	0	1	0	3	2	—		—		25	2
Brighton & Hove Albion	Total		50	2	6	0	5	2	—		—		61	4
Feyenoord	2021–22	Eredivisie	27	4	1	0	—		14 (Note: Appearances in UEFA Europa Conference League)	4	—		42	8
Feyenoord	2022–23	Eredivisie	28	5	4	0	—		8	3	—		40	8
Feyenoord	2023–24	Eredivisie	16	0	1	0	—		5 (Note: Appearance in UEFA Champions League)	1	1 (Note: Appearance in Johan Cruyff Shield)	0	23	1
Feyenoord	Total		71	9	6	0	—		27	8	1	0	105	17
Heerenveen	2024–25	Eredivisie	19	3	1	0	—		—		—		20	3
Dender EH	2025–26	Belgian Pro League	21	1	2	0	—		—		—		23	1
Career total			356	76	41	4	5	2	39	9	4	1	445	92

=== International ===
As of match played 27 June 2026

Appearances and goals by national team and year
National team	Year	Apps	Goals
Iran	2013	3	1
Iran	2014	8	0
Iran	2015	6	0
Iran	2016	9	2
Iran	2017	8	1
Iran	2018	9	1
Iran	2019	7	2
Iran	2020	0	0
Iran	2021	8	4
Iran	2022	9	2
Iran	2023	8	2
Iran	2024	15	2
Iran	2025	7	0
Iran	2026	4	0
Total		101	17

Scores and results list Iran's goal tally first, score column indicates score after each Jahanbakhsh goal.

List of international goals scored by Alireza Jahanbakhsh
No.	Date	Venue	Opponent	Score	Result	Competition
1	15 November 2013	Rajamangala Stadium, Bangkok, Thailand	Thailand	3–0	3–0	2015 AFC Asian Cup qualification
2	24 March 2016	Azadi Stadium, Tehran, Iran	India	4–0	4–0	2018 FIFA World Cup qualification
3	1 September 2016	Azadi Stadium, Tehran, Iran	Qatar	2–0	2–0	2018 FIFA World Cup qualification
4	13 November 2017	Stadion de Goffert, Nijmegen, Netherlands	Venezuela	1–0	1–0	Friendly
5	16 October 2018	Azadi Stadium, Tehran, Iran	Bolivia	1–0	2–1	Friendly
6	20 January 2019	Mohammed bin Zayed Stadium, Abu Dhabi, United Arab Emirates	Oman	1–0	2–0	2019 AFC Asian Cup
7	6 June 2019	Azadi Stadium, Tehran, Iran	Syria	1–0	5–0	Friendly
8	11 June 2021	Bahrain National Stadium, Riffa, Bahrain	Cambodia	1–0	10–0	2022 FIFA World Cup qualification
9	3 September 2021	Azadi Stadium, Tehran, Iran	Syria	1–0	1–0	2022 FIFA World Cup qualification
10	7 September 2021	Khalifa International Stadium, Doha, Qatar	Iraq	1–0	3–0	2022 FIFA World Cup qualification
11	12 October 2021	Azadi Stadium, Tehran, Iran	South Korea	1–1	1–1	2022 FIFA World Cup qualification
12	29 March 2022	Imam Reza Stadium, Mashhad, Iran	Lebanon	2–0	2–0	2022 FIFA World Cup qualification
13	12 June 2022	Suheim bin Hamad Stadium, Doha, Qatar	Algeria	1–1	1–2	Friendly
14	13 June 2023	Dolen Omurzakov Stadium, Bishkek, Kyrgyzstan	Afghanistan	4–0	6–1	2023 CAFA Nations Cup
15	17 October 2023	Amman International Stadium, Amman, Jordan	Qatar	2–0	4–0	2023 Jordan International Tournament
16	3 February 2024	Education City Stadium, Al Rayyan, Qatar	Japan	2–1	2–1	2023 AFC Asian Cup
17	7 February 2024	Al Thumama Stadium, Doha, Qatar	Qatar	2–2	2–3	2023 AFC Asian Cup

== Honours ==
NEC

- Eerste Divisie: 2014–15

AZ

- KNVB Cup runner-up: 2016–17, 2017–18

Feyenoord

- Eredivisie: 2022–23
- KNVB Cup: 2023–24
- UEFA Europa Conference League runner-up: 2021–22

Iran U20

- AFF U-19 Youth Championship: 2012

Iran

- CAFA Nations Cup: 2023
- Jordan International Tournament: 2023

Individual

- AFF U-19 Youth Championship Top goalscorer: 2012
- AFC Asian Cup Team of the Tournament: 2023
- Eerste Divisie First Period Player of the Season: 2014–15
- Eerste Divisie Best Player of the Season (Gouden Stier): 2014–15
- Eredivisie top scorer: 2017–18 (21 goals)
- Premier League Goal of the Month: January 2020
- Feyenoord Goal of Season: 2021–22
- Eredivisie Team of the Month: February 2025

== See also ==
- Iranians in the Netherlands
- List of men's footballers with 100 or more international caps
