= Hossein Ebrahimi =

Iranian footballer (born 1990)

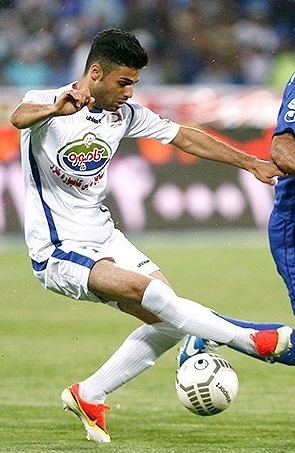

Personal information
- Full name: Mohammad Hossein Ebrahimi
- Date of birth: 3 August 1990 (age 36)
- Place of birth: astaneye ashrafieh, Iran
- Height: 1.73 m (5 ft 8 in)
- Position: Midfielder

Team information
- Current team: Zob Ahan
- Number: 10

Youth career
- 2005–2008: Pegah

Senior career*
Years	Team	Apps	(Gls)
2007–2008	Pegah	23	(5)
2008–2013	Damash Gilan	65	(5)
2009–2011	→ Malavan (loan)	46	(1)
2013–2015	Naft Tehran	50	(3)
2015–2016	Foolad	23	(4)
2017	Machine Sazi	14	(1)
2017–2019	Sepidrood	52	(8)
2019–2020	Naft Masjed Soleyman	29	(4)
2020–2021	Foolad	35	(4)
2020–2022	Zob Ahan	14	

International career
2007–2008	Iran U20	3	(0)
2010	Iran U23	5	(2)
2008	Iran	1	(0)
- * Club domestic league appearances and goals

Hossein Ebrahimi (Persian: حسین ابراهیمی, born 3 August 1990) is an Iranian footballer who plays for Havadar S.C. of the Persian Gulf Pro League as a midfielder.

== Club career ==
Ebrahimi joined the Pegah youth system in 2005. He starts to play in Iran Pro League when he was 17 years old in 2007. In the beginning of 2008–09 season Pegah was sold and change its name to Damash. After playing two seasons for the club he had to leave Damash to Malavan for military services, He had a good season with Malavan in his first year and played in most of games, but was mostly benched on the 2010–11 season due injury.

On 15 May 2013, he signed a three-year contract with Naft Tehran.

== Career statistics ==
=== Club ===
As of 27 April 2015

Club performance			League		Cup		Continental		Total	
Season	Club	League	Apps	Goals	Apps	Goals	Apps	Goals	Apps	Goals
Iran			League		Hazfi Cup		Asia		Total	
2007–08	Pegah	Pro League	23	5	4	0	–		27	5
2008–09	Damash	Pro League	18	1	0	0	–		18	1
2009–10	Malavan	Pro League	28	1	1	0	–		29	1
2010–11	Malavan	Pro League	16	0	0	0	–		16	0
2011–12	Damash	Pro League	17	0	2	0	–		19	0
2012–13	Damash	Pro League	29	4	4	0	–		33	4
2013–14	Naft Tehran	Pro League	26	1	0	0	–		26	1
2014–15	Naft Tehran	Pro League	21	2	4	1	2	0	27	3
Career total			183	14	15	1	2	0	193	15

== Honours ==
Foolad

- Hazfi Cup: 2020–21

Iran

- WAFF Championship: 2008
