= Mehdi Kiani (footballer, born 1978) =

Iranian footballer

Personal information
- Full name: Mehdi Kiani
- Date of birth: July 23, 1978 (age 48)
- Place of birth: Abadan, Iran
- Positions: Midfielder; left back

Senior career*
Years	Team	Apps	(Gls)
2007–2009	Mes Kerman	50	(5)
2009–2012	Shahin Bushehr	55	(4)
2012	Damash	13	(2)
2012–2013	Sanat Naft	11	(0)
2013–2014	Aboumoslem	6	(0)
2014–2015	Damash	11	(1)
Total		146	(12)
- * Club domestic league appearances and goals as of 11 April 2015

Mehdi Kiani (Persian: مهدی کیانی; born July 23, 1978) is a retired Iranian football midfielder.

== Club career ==
In 2009, Kiani joined Shahin Bushehr after spending the previous two seasons at Mes Kerman F.C. He retired at Damash in 2015.

=== Club career statistics ===
As of 18 DEC 2012

Club performance			League		Cup		Total	
Season	Club	League	Apps	Goals	Apps	Goals	Apps	Goals
Iran			League		Hazfi Cup		Total	
2007–08	Mes	Pro League	32	5	1	0	33	5
2008–09	Mes	Pro League	18	0				
2009–10	Shahin	Pro League	25	3				
2010–11	Shahin	Pro League	14	1	0	0	14	0
2011–12	Shahin	Pro League	16	0	2	0	18	0
2012–13	Damash	Pro League	13	2	0	0	13	2
Career total			118	11				

- Assist Goals

Season	Team	Assists
09–10	Shahin	1
10–11	Shahin	2
11–12	Shahin	3
12–13	Damash	0

== Honours ==
=== Club ===
- Hazfi Cup
  - Runner up:1
    - 2011–12 with Shahin Bushehr
