= Boubacar Kébé =

Burkinabé-Malian footballer (born 1987)

Personal information
- Full name: Boubacar Djeedy Kébé
- Date of birth: 10 May 1987 (age 39)
- Place of birth: Ouagadougou, Burkina Faso
- Height: 1.78 m (5 ft 10 in)
- Position: Forward

Youth career
- 1996–2001: Torcy
- 2001–2002: Blackburn Rovers
- 2002–2005: Bordeaux

Senior career*
Years	Team	Apps	(Gls)
2005–2006	Bordeaux B	28	(5)
2006–2007	→ Libourne (loan)	21	(1)
2007–2008	Libourne	18	(1)
2008	Nîmes	17	(5)
2008–2011	Strasbourg	14	(7)
2011–2012	Cherbourg	32	(14)
2012–2013	Damash Gilan	17	(2)
2013–2014	Esteghlal	3	(1)
2014–2016	Al-Hilal		
2016	Al-Raed	7	(1)
2016–2017	Progresso LS		
2019	Noisy FC	6	(1)
2020	L'Entente SSG	4	(1)
2020	Brétigny	1	(0)
Total		168	(39)

International career
2003–2005	Mali U-20	17	(5)
2005–2007	Burkina Faso U-23	15	(7)
2012	Burkina Faso	1	(0)

Managerial career
- 2019–2021: Paris FC (youth coach)
- 2021–202?: Saint-Leu 95 (head of academy)
- * Club domestic league appearances and goals

Boubacar Djeedy Kébé (born 10 May 1987) is a retired Burkinabé-Malian professional footballer.

== Club career ==
Kébé was born in Ouagadougou, Burkina Faso. His career began at US Torcy in the Paris region at the age of 7. Later in his youth career, he joined English club Blackburn Rovers, where he signed a pre-contract with the club, which would only come into effect once he turned 18. However, he left the club at the age of 16 before the contract took effect, as Bordeaux came knocking on his door, ultimately leading him to join the French club.

He formerly played for Girondins de Bordeaux, FC Libourne-Saint-Seurin and Nimes Olympique by Nimes shot 7 goals in 15 games and was transferred on 16 December to RC Strasbourg.

He joined Iranian Pro League side Damash Gilan in December 2012. He made his debut on 4 December 2012 for Damash, he came on as a substitute in 52nd minute and scored in the 85th minute to make it a 1–0 victory over Esteghlal. After playing for Damash for one and a half years, he signed a one-year contract with Esteghlal on 6 November 2013. He made his debut in a Hazfi Cup match over Caspian Qazvin but he was injured in the 10th minute and was out for one month. He scored his first goal for Esteghlal on 9 February 2014 in a match against Saipa in his first league appearance.

== International career ==
He also capped for Mali U20 at 2005 African Youth Championship.

== Personal life ==
His father is Malian and mother is Burkinabé, Yahia Kébé is the elder brother from Boubacar Kébé and sister Asta.

== Coaching career ==
During the last years of his player career, Kébé started coaching at Paris FC's academy. In the summer 2021, Kébé was appointed head of FC Saint-Leu 95's academy.

In the following years, Kébé was involved in several football training initiatives for youth players: he became a personal trainer under his own company BJ Footévolution.

== Career statistics ==
Appearances and goals by club, season and competition
Club	Season	League			Cup		League Cup		Continental		Total	
Club	Season	Division	Apps	Goals	Apps	Goals	Apps	Goals	Apps	Goals	Apps	Goals
Libourne (loan)	2006–07	Ligue 2	21	1	3	0	1	0	—		25	1
Libourne	2007–08	Ligue 2	18	1	0	0	1	0	—		19	1
Libourne	Libourne Total		39	2	3	0	2	0	—		44	2
Nîmes	2008–09	Ligue 2	17	5	2	0	2	2	—		21	7
Strasbourg	2008–09	Ligue 2	10	0	—		—		—		14	2
Strasbourg	2009–10	Ligue 2	4	0	0	0	0	0	—		4	0
Strasbourg	2010–11	Championnat National	0	0	0	0	—		—		0	0
Strasbourg	Total		14	0	0	0	0	0	—		14	0
Cherbourg	2011–12	Championnat National	32	9	3	2	—		—		35	11
Damash	2012–13	Iran Pro League	9	2	3	1	—		—		12	3
Damash	2013–14	Iran Pro League	8	0	0	0	—		—		8	0
Damash	Total		17	2	3	1	—		—		20	3
Esteghlal	2013–14	Iran Pro League	3	1	1	0	—		3	2	7	3
Al Hilal	2014	Sudan Premier League					—		—		0	0
Al Hilal	2015	Sudan Premier League					—		9	2	9	2
Al Hilal	Total						—		9	2	9	2
Al Raed	2015–16	Saudi Professional League	7	1	1	0	—		—		8	1
Progresso da Lunda Sul	2016	Girabola					—		—		0	0
Progresso da Lunda Sul	2017	Girabola					—		—		0	0
Progresso da Lunda Sul	Total						—		—		0	0
Noisy-le-Grand	2019–20	Championnat National 3	6	1	—		—		—		6	1
Entente SSG	2019–20	Championnat National 2	4	1	1	0	—		—		5	1
Brétigny	2020–21	Championnat National 3	1	0	—		—		—		1	0
Career total			140	22	14	3	4	2	12	4	170	31
