= Shahid Dr. Azodi Stadium =

Stadium in Iran

Coordinates: 37°15′53″N 49°35′21″E

Shahid Azodi Stadium
- شهید عضدی رشت
- Interactive map of Shahid Azodi Stadium
- Full name: Shahid Dr.Azodi Stadium
- Location: Rasht, Iran
- Owner: S.C. Damash Gilanian
- Capacity: 11,000
- Surface: Artificial Grass

Construction
- Built: 1988–1990
- Opened: 1990
- Renovated: 2009–2011

Tenant
- Damash Gilan (1990–present) - Sepidrood Rasht (unknown-present)

The Shahid Dr. Azodi Stadium (Persian: استادیوم دکتر شهید عضدی رشت) is a multipurpose stadium in Rasht, Iran. It is currently used mostly for football matches and is the second stadium of S.C. Damash Gilan and the main stadium of Sepidrood Rasht, who play in the Persian Tier 2 Persian League. The stadium holds up to 11,000 people. Azodi's location is in near Manzariyeh, known to be near Kadoos Hotel and Banovan Park.

Damash's main stadium is known to be Sardar Jangal Stadium due to Sepidrood playing more in Azodi.

== Name ==
The stadium is named after Dr. Hassan Azodi who was killed on June 28, 1981, in an explosion at the central office of the Islamic Republican Party.

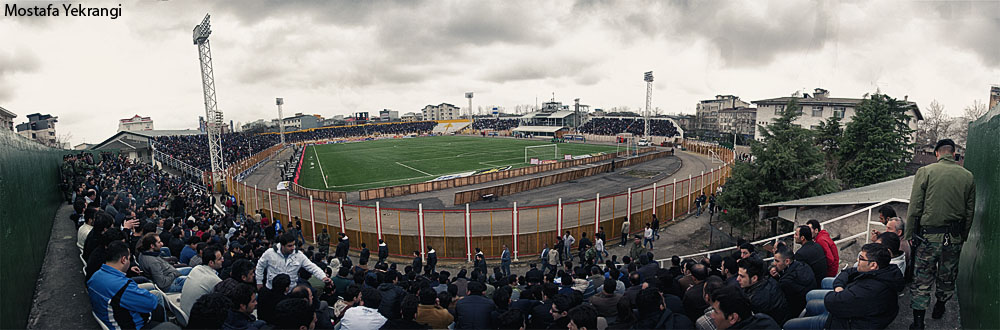
Shahid Azodi Stadium during one of Damash Gilan's match

== Stadium Entry Fee ==
The stadium hasn't been charging any fee for entry as Sepidrood and Damash play as currently low budget teams. This decision was made to attract more fans to attend the team's matches. Until 2023, the no entry fee worked as more and more fans started attending matches but as the team's started acting poorly, many fans decided to not attend the matches even though the entry fee is charged free. Until now, the free trick is still ongoing with failed results.
