= Mohammad Reza Mahdavi (born 1981) =

Iranian footballer

Mohammadreza Mahdavi
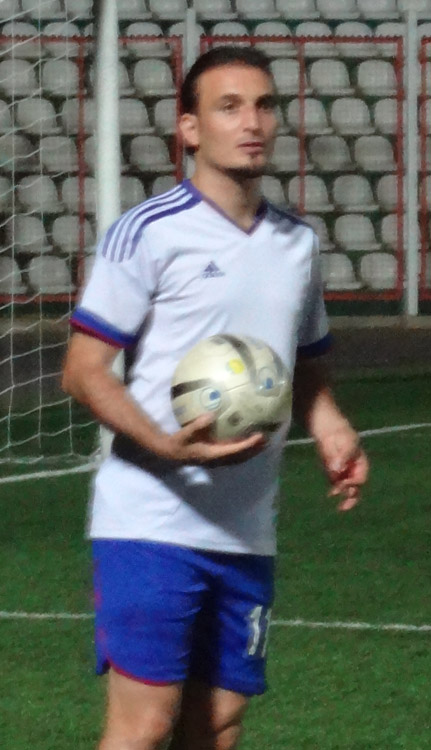
- Mahdavi in July 2012

Personal information
- Date of birth: January 27, 1981 (age 45)
- Place of birth: Rasht, Iran
- Position: Midfielder

Youth career
- 2000–2002: Sepidrood Rasht

Senior career*
| Years | Team | Apps | (Gls) |
| 2002–2004 | Sepidrood Rasht | | |
| 2004–2008 | Pegah Gilan | | |
| 2008–2009 | Damash | 32 | (3) |
| 2009–2010 | Steel Azin | 28 | (1) |
| 2010–2014 | Damash | 104 | (11) |
| 2014–2015 | Esteghlal Khuzestan | 22 | (2) |
| 2016 | Damash | 11 | (2) |
| 2016–2019 | Sepidrood Rasht | 44 | (0) |
- * Club domestic league appearances and goals

Mohammad Reza Mahdavi (Persian: محمدرضا مهدوی, born 27 January 1981 in Rasht) is a retired Iranian football player, who last played for Sepidrood. He played most his career for his hometown team Damash.

== Club career ==
He has played most his career for his hometown teams Pegah Gilan and Damash Gilan. After Damash relegation to Azadegan League in 2009, he moved to Pro League team Steel Azin along with other Damash players Afshin Chavoshi and Ali Nazarmohammadi where he stayed for one season and return to Damash in 2010. He helped Damash to go back to IPL in 2011 as club's captain.

After the relegation of Damash, Mahdavi joined Esteghlal Khuzestan. He was also named as the club's captain after the departure of Sohrab Bakhtiarizadeh.

== Club career statistics ==
As of April 19, 2018

| Club performance | | | League | | Cup | | Total | |
| Season | Club | League | Apps | Goals | Apps | Goals | Apps | Goals |
| Iran | | | League | | Hazfi Cup | | Total | |
|---|---|---|---|---|---|---|---|---|
| 2006–07 | Pegah | Azadegan League | 18 | 0 | 1 | 0 | 19 | 0 |
| 2007–08 | Pegah | Pro League | 31 | 4 | 6 | 0 | 37 | 4 |
| 2008–09 | Damash | Pro League | 32 | 3 | 0 | 0 | 32 | 3 |
| 2009–10 | Steel Azin | Pro League | 28 | 1 | 1 | 0 | 29 | 1 |
| 2010–11 | Damash | Azadegan League | 21 | 6 | 2 | 1 | 23 | 7 |
| 2011–12 | Damash | Pro League | 31 | 1 | 2 | 1 | 33 | 2 |
| 2012–13 | Damash | Pro League | 31 | 3 | 3 | 1 | 34 | 4 |
| 2013–14 | Damash | Pro League | 21 | 1 | 1 | 0 | 22 | 1 |
| 2014–15 | Est. Khuzestan | Pro League | 22 | 2 | 2 | 0 | 24 | 2 |
| 2015–16 | Damash | Azadegan League | 11 | 2 | – | – | 11 | 2 |
| 2016–17 | Sepidrood | Azadegan League | | 0 | – | – | | 0 |
| 2017–18 | Sepidrood | Pro League | 13 | 0 | 0 | 0 | 13 | 0 |
| 2018–19 | Sepidrood | Pro League | 23 | 0 | 1 | 0 | 24 | 0 |
| Career total | | | 282 | 23 | 19 | 3 | 301 | 26 |

- Assist Goals

| Season | Team | Assists |
|---|---|---|
| 07–08 | Pegah | 4 |
| 08–09 | Damash | 4 |
| 09–10 | Steel Azin | 1 |
| 11–12 | Damash | 3 |
| 12–13 | Damash | 2 |
| 13–14 | Damash | 1 |
| 14–15 | Est. Khuzestan | 0 |
