= Afshin Chavoshi =

Iranian football player

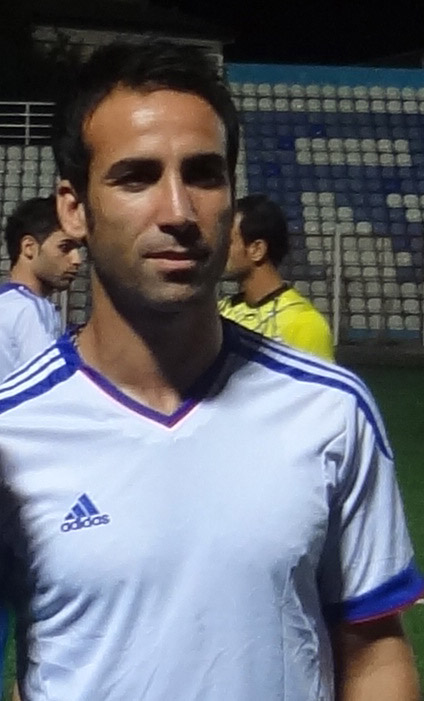
- Chavoshi in July 2012

Personal information
- Full name: Seyyed Reza Chavoshi Gilaninejad
- Date of birth: 17 September 1984 (age 42)
- Place of birth: Rasht, Iran
- Position: Striker

Youth career
- 1998–2001: Esteghlal Rasht

Senior career*
| Years | Team | Apps | (Gls) |
| 2001–2002 | Esteghlal Rasht | 9 | (1) |
| 2002–2008 | Pegah | 64 | (32) |
| 2003 | → Malavan (loan) | 0 | (0) |
| 2008–2009 | Damash | 24 | (15) |
| 2009–2010 | Steel Azin | 19 | (4) |
| 2010–2014 | Damash | 84 | (24) |
| 2014 | Aluminium | 11 | (2) |
| 2014–2015 | Damash | 3 | (1) |
| 2015–2016 | Sepidrood | 2 | (1) |

International career
| 2005 | Iran U23 | 3 | (2) |
- * Club domestic league appearances and goals as of 17 October 2015

Seyyed Reza "Afshin" Chavoshi (born 17 September 1984, Rasht) is a retired Iranian football player who played as a striker.

== Club career ==
In 2001, he was called up to Esteghlal Rasht from the youth team by Nasser Hejazi when he was 17 years old. Chavoshi scored his first goal in Iran Pro League in a 2–0 win over Aboomoslem in the same season. The following season, after relegation to Azadegan League and dissolution of Esteghlal Rasht, he played the next season with a new team Pegah. He was transferred to Malavan in the 2003–04 season because of army services but did not play a single game due to injury. He returned to Pegah in 2004 and continued his career with the team until October 2008 when Pegah was sold to Damash Iranian (Damash Mineral Water Company) due to financial problems and Chavohsi played in a new team Damash Gilan in the 2009–10 season. He had very good time with Damash In 2009–10 season he scored 15 goals and became the 4th best goal-scorer of the league but Despite having a good season and score many goals, Damash was relegated to first division and Chavoshi was transferred to Steel Azin. After playing one season at Steel Azin he moved back to Damash in 2010 and help the team to promote back to Iran Pro League he also became top goal scorer of season. On last days of December 2013 he made a 3 months deal with Aluminium until end of 2013–14 Azadegan League.

== Famous match ==
On 11 April 2008 he played one of his memorial matches for Pegah against Esteghlal Tehran in Azadi Stadium which he scored and assist twice. Pegah was able to beat Esteghlal 4 to 1 and this is one of the worst lost in Esteghlal's club history.

=== Club career statistics ===
As of 30 April 2015

| Club performance | | | League | | Cup | | Total | |
| Season | Club | League | Apps | Goals | Apps | Goals | Apps | Goals |
| Iran | | | League | | Hazfi Cup | | Total | |
|---|---|---|---|---|---|---|---|---|
| 2006–07 | Pegah | 1st Division | 15 | 3 | 0 | 0 | 15 | 3 |
| 2007–08 | Pegah | Pro League | 21 | 3 | 4 | 3 | 25 | 6 |
| 2008–09 | Damash | Pro League | 24 | 15 | 0 | 0 | 24 | 15 |
| 2009–10 | Steel Azin | Pro League | 19 | 4 | 0 | 0 | 19 | 4 |
| 2010–11 | Damash | 1st Division | 18 | 13 | 3 | 3 | 21 | 16 |
| 2011–12 | Damash | Pro League | 26 | 7 | 1 | 0 | 27 | 7 |
| 2012–13 | Damash | Pro League | 24 | 3 | 2 | 0 | 26 | 3 |
| 2013–14 | Damash | Pro League | 10 | 1 | 0 | 0 | 10 | 1 |
| 2013–14 | Aluminium | 1st Division | 11 | 2 | 0 | 0 | 11 | 2 |
| 2014–15 | Damash | 1st Division | 3 | 1 | 0 | 0 | 3 | 1 |
| Career total | | | 171 | 52 | 10 | 6 | 180 | 58 |

- Assist Goals

| Season | Team | Assists |
|---|---|---|
| 07–08 | Pegah | 2 |
| 09–10 | Steel Azin | 1 |
| 11–12 | Damash | 0 |
| 12–13 | Damash | 2 |
| 13–14 | Damash | 1 |

== International career ==
In 2005, he was called up for Iran national under-23 football team.
