= Sepidrood Rasht S.C. =

Sepidrood سپیدرود
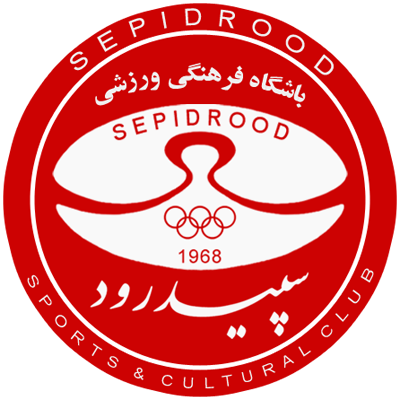
- Full name: Sepidrood Rasht Sport Club
- Nicknames: Red Army of Gilan; The Fishes
- Short name: Sepidrood
- Founded: 29 June 1968; 57 years ago
- Ground: Sardar Jangal Stadium
- Capacity: 25,000
- Owner: Hamed Yousefi
- Chairman: Peyman Parsa
- Manager: Akbar Misaghian
- League: League 2
- 2024-25: League 2 / Group A, 4th
- Website: http://www.sepidroodsc.com
Home colours	Away colours

Sepidrood Rasht Sport Club (Persian: باشگاه ورزشی سپیدرود رشت, Bashgah-e Varzeshi-ye Sepidrod Resht) is an Iranian football club based in Rasht, Iran. They currently compete in League 2.

Sepidrood competes against Malavan in the El Gilano and also has a friendly rivalry with cross-city rival Damash Gilan. Sepidrood is now the only Iranian existing club that has won the Aga Khan Asian Gold Cup.

== History ==
=== Establishment ===
Sepidrood Rasht Football Club is one of the oldest clubs in northern Iran founded in 1968 and is the first sports club to be based in Rasht. The team was named after the Sefīd-Rūd river which runs through the area. Sepidrood became champions of the Gilan Provincial League after the revolution three times, in 1983, 1986 and in 2003.

=== Lower Leagues ===
On 15 May 2010, Sepidrood secured promotion and thus played in the Azadegan League in the 2010–11 season for the first time in eleven years, however, the club was relegated at the end of the season.

In 2014 Despite relegating to 3rd Division, Sepidrood bought Shahrdari Langarud license and remained in Second Division. After a good 2015–16 season in which Sepidrood made the last round of the 2nd Division, the team were promoted after finishing first in Group B.

=== Promotion to the top flight ===
Sepidrood started the 2016–17 season in the Azadegan League excellently, and at the halfway point of the season they were leading the league. On the second last match day of the season, Sepidrood lost to third place team Gol Gohar Sirjan 3–2 and their promotion to the top flight came into serious danger. However, on 1 May 2017 Sepidrood defeated Nassaji Mazandaran 3–2 and were promoted to the Persian Gulf Pro League and the top flight of Iranian football for the first time in their 49 year history.

== Colours and badge ==
Since its founding, the club colors have been red and white. Sepidrood is known by its fans as the Red Army.

== Owner ==
The owner of the club is Javad Tanzadeh (an Iranian businessman).

== Honours ==
- Azadegan League (Persian Gulf Pro League promotion)
  - Runners-up (1): 2016–17
- Aga Khan Gold Cup
  - Winners (1): 1977

== El Gilano ==
The match between Sepidrood or Damash and Malavan is known as The Derby Of Gilan or El Gilano. This derby is one of Iran's most important and heated derbies.

== Players ==
=== First-team squad ===
As of 31 July 2020 Note: Flags indicate national team as defined under FIFA eligibility rules; some limited exceptions apply. Players may hold more than one non-FIFA nationality.

No.	Pos.	Nation	Player
1	GK	IRN	Iman Sadeghi
2	DF	GEO	Luka Nozadze
4	MF	IRN	Meysam Tohidast
5	DF	IRN	Milad Sheikh Soleimani
7	MF	IRN	Meysam Ferdousi
8	MF	IRN	Hossein Ebrahimi
10	FW	IRN	Pouya Nozhati
11	MF	IRN	Mohammad Reza Mahdavi ((association football))
17	DF	IRN	Amin Javadi Moghadam ^{U23}
18	FW	IRN	Javad Aghaeipour ^{U19}
19	DF	IRN	Mahyar noori /Captain

No.	Pos.	Nation	Player
23	MF	IRN	Ali Abbasi ^{U23}
27	DF	IRN	Ebrahim Lotfi ^{U19}
28	FW	IRN	Mehdi Mohammad Yari ^{U23}
36	MF	IRN	Amirhossein Eskandari ^{U21}
40	DF	GEO	Roman Chachua
70	DF	IRN	SINA JAFARINEJAD ^{U19}
77	GK	IRN	Maziar Nouri

=== Reserves ===
Note: Flags indicate national team as defined under FIFA eligibility rules; some limited exceptions apply. Players may hold more than one non-FIFA nationality.

No.	Pos.	Nation	Player
3	DF	IRN	Mohammad Amin Pournaghi ^{U19}
17	MF	IRN	Amir Hossein Eskandari ^{U21}
18	MF	IRN	Javad Aghaeipour ^{U19}
28	FW	IRN	Mehdi Mohammad Yari ^{U19}

No.	Pos.	Nation	Player
35	MF	IRN	Hadi Dadres ^{U19}
39	MF	IRN	Reza Ashouri ^{U21}
50	GK	IRN	Arian Sohrabi ^{U21}
70	DF	IRN	SINA JAFARINEJAD ^{U19}

== Season-by-season ==
For details on seasons, see List of Sepidrood Rasht F.C. seasons

Season	League	Position	Iranian Hazfi Cup	Notes
2004–05	League 2	6th (Group 1)	did not participate	
2005–06	League 2	5th (Group A)	did not participate	
2006–07	League 2	13th (Group 2)	did not participate	Relegated
2007–08	League 2	3rd (Group B)	Second round	
2008–09	League 2	4th (1st round - Group D)	Second round	
2009–10	League 2	1st	First stage	Promoted
2010–11	Azadegan League	14th	Round of 32	Relegated
2011–12	League 2	10th (Group A)	did not participate	
2012–13	League 2	4th (Group B)	did not participate	
2013–14	League 2	12th (Group B)	First stage	Relegated
2014–15	League 2	3rd (2nd round - Group B)	First stage	
2015–16	League 2	1st (2nd round - Group B)	did not participate	Promoted
2016–17	Azadegan League	2nd	did not participate	Promoted
2017–18	Persian Gulf Pro League	13th	Round of 32	
2018–19	Persian Gulf Pro League	15th	Round of 16	Relegated
2019–20	Azadegan League	17th	did not participate	Relegated
2020–21	League 2	7th (Group A)	did not participate	

== Famous players ==
- Mohammad Reza Mahdavi
- Reza Niknazar
- Soheil Haghshenas
- Hossein Kaebi
