= Pegah F.C. =

Pegah Gilan
- Full name: Pegah Gilan Football Club
- Founded: 2002
- Dissolved: 2008 (became S.C. Damash Gilan)
- Ground: Shahid Dr. Azodi Stadium
- Capacity: 11,000
- League: Persian Gulf Cup
- 2007–08: Persian Gulf Cup, 15th
Home colours	Away colours

Pegah Gilan Football Club (Persian: باشگاه فوتبال پگاه گیلان) was an Iranian football club based in Rasht that participated in the Iran Pro League and the Azadegan League from 2002 to 2008.

== Club history ==
The club began its life with the name, Esteghlal Rasht. They spent a number of seasons in the lower leagues of Iranian football but made it back to the top level, finishing 10th in the 2000–01 season. The next season proved to be disastrous for the team, they were managed by Nasser Hejazi, but finished 13th in the standings. They were relegated and embarrassingly lost 9–2 to Aboomoslem on the last match day of the season. The following season Pegah Dairy Co. bought the team, making it one of the few privately owned football clubs in Iran. The popular club was named as Pegah Gilan.They won promotion again that season and went back to the IPL. They stayed in the IPL for two seasons but were relegated again in the 2004–05 season. Despite finishing first in Group A standings in the Azadegan league during the 2005–06 season, they were eliminated in the playoff stage and missed out on promotion.

=== Success Under Nader Dastneshan ===
Pegah under Nader Dastneshan were able to beat Persepolis, Esteghlal, Saipa in 2007–08 season and even make it to the final game of Hazfi Cup but losing to Esteghlal.

=== Dissolution of Pegah ===
In October 2008 Pegah terminated their sports activities due to financial problems. Damash Iranian (Damash Mineral Water Company) owned by Amir Abedini took over their license. The club was named Damash Gilan.

== Season-by-season ==
Season	League	Position	Hazfi Cup	Notes
2002–03	Azadegan League	2nd	—	Promoted to Pro League
2003–04	Pro League	9th	Round of 16	
2004–05	Pro League	16th	Round of 16	Relegated to Azadegan League
2005–06	Azadegan League	1st	—	Qualified to Second round
2006–07	Azadegan League	1st	—	Promoted to Pro League
2007–08	Pro League	15th	Final	

== Honours ==
- Hazfi Cup
  - Runners-up (1): 2007–08

== Club managers ==
=== Managerial history ===
- (Iran) Asghar Sharafi (2002)
- (Iran) Majid Jahanpour (2002–2004)
- (Serbia and Montenegro) Miodrag Ješić (2004)
- (Serbia and Montenegro) Đorđe Jovanović (2004)
- (Iran) Asghar Sharafi (2004–2005)
- (Austria) Bernd Krauss (2005)
- (Croatia) Vinko Begović (2005–2006)
- (Iran) Majid Jahanpour (2006–2007)
- (Croatia) Darko Dražić (interim) (2007)
- (Iran) Nader Dastneshan (2007–2008)
- (Iran) Bijan Zolfagharnasab (2008)

=== Famous players ===
- (Iran) Aref Mohammadvand
- (Iran) Pejman Nouri
- (Iran) Sirous Dinmohammadi
- (Iran) Dariush Yazdani
- (Iran) Mohammad Reza Mahdavi
- (Iran) Ebrahim Taghipour
- (Iran) Afshin Chavoshi
- (Romania) Iosif Tâlvan
- (North Macedonia) Saša Ilić
- (Serbia) Saša Radivojević
- (Serbia) Dejan Maksić
