= 2007–08 Persepolis F.C. season =

Persepolis F.C. season

Persepolis
2007–08 season
- Chairman: Habib Kashani
- Manager: Afshin Ghotbi
- Persian Gulf Cup: Winners
- Hazfi Cup: Round of 16
- Top goalscorer: League: Mohsen Khalili (18); All: Mohsen Khalili (18)
- Highest home attendance: 110,000 v Sepahan (17 May 2008)
- Lowest home attendance: 0 v Sanat Naft (22 January 2008, spectator ban)
- Average home league attendance: 60,000
Home colours	Away colours

The 2007–08 season was Persepolis's 7th season in the Pro League, and their 25th consecutive season in the top division of Iranian Football. They were also competing in the Hazfi Cup.

== Squad ==
=== Iran Pro League ===
Note: Flags indicate national team as defined under FIFA eligibility rules; some limited exceptions apply. Players may hold more than one non-FIFA nationality.

No.	Pos.	Nation	Player
1	GK	IRI	Mehdi Vaezi
2	DF	IRI	Masoud Zarei
3	DF	IRI	Sepehr Heidari
4	MF	IRI	Mohammad Reza Mamani
5	DF	IRI	Nabiollah Bagheriha
6	MF	IRI	Karim Bagheri (captain)
8	MF	IRI	Hossein Badamaki
9	FW	IRI	Mohsen Khalili
10	MF	IRI	Alireza Vahedi Nikbakht
11	FW	IRI	Faraz Fatemi
12	FW	IRI	Hossein Kaebi
13	DF	IRI	Sheys Rezaei (3rd-captain)
14	FW	IRI	Ehsan Khorsandi
16	MF	PAR	Jorge Gaona

No.	Pos.	Nation	Player
17	MF	IRI	Farzad Ashoubi
18	MF	IRI	Pejman Nouri
19	MF	IRI	Bahador Abdi
20	DF	IRI	Mohammad Nosrati
21	DF	IRI	Ziaeddin Niknafs
22	GK	IRI	Hassan Roudbarian
24	FW	CRO	Mate Dragičević
25	MF	CMR	Jacques Elong Elong
26	MF	IRI	Hamidreza Aliasgari
27	MF	IRI	Abbas Aghaei
28	FW	IRI	Farhad Kheirkhah
29	MF	IRI	Mehran Farziat
30	GK	IRI	Farshid Karimi (Vice-captain)
33	GK	IRI	Alireza Haghighi

== Persian Gulf Cup ==
=== Matches ===
Date Round	Home	Score	Away	Location

16 August 2007 1	Sanat Naft	2 – 3	Persepolis	Abadan
	R. Arab 16'; M. De Souza 65'	2-3	F. Ashoubi 10'; M. Khalili 45'; A. Nikbakht 81'	Stadium: Takhti Stadium; Attendance: 25,000; Referee: Khodadad Afsharian

24 August 2007 2	Persepolis	2 – 0	Pegah	Tehran
	A. Aghaei 18'; E. Khorsandi 22'	2-0		Stadium: Azadi Stadium; Attendance: 50,000; Referee: Hedayat Mombeini

29 August 2007 3	Aboumoslem	0 – 3	Persepolis	Mashhad
	A. Moghaddasipour (red card) 90+3'	0-3	A. Nikbakht 3' (pen.); M. Khalili 54', 90+2'	Stadium: Takhti Stadium; Attendance: 40,000; Referee: Masoud Moradi

7 September 2007 4	Persepolis	2 – 1	Paykan	Tehran
	M. Khalili 41'; S. Heydari 52'	2-1	M. Mohammadi 70'	Stadium: Azadi Stadium; Attendance: 65,000; Referee: Alireza Faghani

16 September 2007 5	Rah Ahan	0 – 0	Persepolis	Tehran
		0-0		Stadium: Azadi Stadium; Attendance: 85,000; Referee: Yadollah Jahanbazi

21 September 2007 6	Persepolis	3 – 3	Moghavemat Sepasi	Tehran
	M. Khalili 14', 22'; A. Aghaei 43'	3-3	M. Mohammadi 7' (pen.); B. Tahmasebi 45', 55'	Stadium: Azadi Stadium; Attendance: 60,000; Referee: Mohsen Ghahremani

27 September 2007 7	Pas	1 – 2	Persepolis	Hamedan
	M. Chatrabgoon 19'	1-2	A. Aghaei 29'; A. Nikbakht 40'; Sh. Rezaei (yellow card) (yellow-red card)	Stadium: Qods Stadium; Attendance: 10,000; Referee: Mahmoud Rafiei

5 October 2007 8	Persepolis	2 – 1	Zob Ahan	Tehran
	S. Heydari 22'; K. Bagheri 59'	2-1	M. Mosalman 16'	Stadium: Azadi Stadium; Attendance: 50,000; Referee: Khodadad Afsharian

14 October 2007 9	Esteghlal	1 – 1	Persepolis	Tehran
	O. Ravankhah 57'	1-1	M. Khalili 84'	Stadium: Azadi Stadium; Attendance: 90,000; Referee: (Spain) Eduardo Iturralde González

19 October 2007 10	Persepolis	3 – 2	Esteghlal Ahvaz	Tehran
	K. Bagheri 15'; H. Badamaki 41', 90+2'; M. Nosrati (red card) 70'	3-2	M. Meydavoudi 21'; M. Haghipour 73'	Stadium: Azadi Stadium; Attendance: 70,000; Referee: Masoud Moradi

25 October 2007 11	Malavan	1 – 1	Persepolis	Anzali
	J. Rafkhaei 39'	1-1	A. Nikbakht 28'	Stadium: Takhti Stadium; Attendance: 25,000; Referee: Saeid Mozaffari Zadeh

2 November 2007 12	Persepolis	1 – 0	Mes Kerman	Tehran
	F. Fatemi 72'	1-0		Stadium: Azadi Stadium; Attendance: 70,000; Referee: Rahim Rahimi Moghadam

11 November 2007 13	Shirin Faraz	0 – 0	Persepolis	Kermanshah
		0-0		Stadium: Azadi Stadium; Attendance: 8,000; Referee: Khodadad Afsharian

16 November 2007 14	Persepolis	1 – 0	Saipa	Tehran
	M. Khalili 90+5'	1-0		Stadium: Azadi Stadium; Attendance: 70,000; Referee: Masoud Moradi

29 November 2007 15	Bargh Shiraz	0 – 1	Persepolis	Shiraz
		0-1	M. Khalili 78'	Stadium: Hafezieh Stadium; Attendance: 25,000; Referee: Alireza Faghani

7 December 2007 16	Persepolis	2 – 2	Saba Battery	Tehran
	A. Aghaei 61'; F. Ashoubi 66'	2-2	A. Kolahkaj (red card) 67'; A. Abbasfard 81'; M. Asadi 84' (pen.)	Stadium: Azadi Stadium; Attendance: 30,000; Referee: Saeid Mozaffari Zadeh

31 December 2007 17	Sepahan	2 – 1	Persepolis	Isfahan
	M. Nosrati 36' (o.g.); E. Mohammed 41'	2-1	A. Aghaei 80'	Stadium: Naghsh-e Jahan Stadium; Attendance: 25,000; Referee: Khodadad Afsharian

22 January 2008 18	Persepolis	1 – 0	Sanat Naft	Tehran
	A. Aghaei 20'	1-0		Stadium: Azadi Stadium; Attendance: NA; Referee: Rahim Rahimi Moghadam

27 January 2008 19	Pegah	1 – 0	Persepolis	Rasht
	H. Ebrahimi 10'; H. Sohrabi (red card) 37'	1-0	M. Nosrati (yellow card) (yellow-red card) 56'	Stadium: Shahid Dr. Azodi Stadium; Attendance: 10,000; Referee: Alireza Faghani

10 February 2008 20	Persepolis	3 – 3	Aboumoslem	Tehran
	A. Aghaei 54'; A. Nikbakht 59' (pen.); M. Dragičević 88'	3-3	I. Petrović 6', 44'; F. Atsou 32'; S. Khani (red card) 61'	Stadium: Azadi Stadium; Attendance: 25,000; Referee: Hedayat Mombeini

15 February 2008 21	Paykan	1 – 2	Persepolis	Tehran
	M. Mehdizadeh 65'	1-2	M. Dragičević 17'; M. Khalili 78'	Stadium: Azadi Stadium; Attendance: 20,000; Referee: Shahin Hajbabaei

20 February 2008 22	Persepolis	1 – 2	Rah Ahan	Tehran
	A. Nikbakht 65'	1-2	M. Baou 20'; A. Taghavi 29'; G. Kasparov (yellow card) (yellow-red card) 75'	Stadium: Azadi Stadium; Attendance: 20,000; Referee: Khodadad Afsharian

2 March 2008 23	Moghavemat Sepasi	0 – 2	Persepolis	Tehran
		0-2	A. Nikbakht 30'; H. Badamaki 50'	Stadium: Azadi Stadium; Attendance: 15,000; Referee: Mohsen Ghahremani

9 March 2008 24	Persepolis	1 – 1	Pas	Tehran
	A. Nikbakht 79'	1-1	Y. Akbari 29', (penalty missed) 90+3'	Stadium: Azadi Stadium; Attendance: 50,000; Referee: Alireza Faghani

29 March 2008 25	Zob Ahan	2 – 0	Persepolis	Fuladshahr
	M. Khalatbari 78'; M. Salehinejad 80'	2-0		Stadium: Fuladshahr Stadium; Attendance: 20,000; Referee: Mohsen Torky

4 April 2008 26	Persepolis	1 – 1	Esteghlal	Tehran
	M. Khalili 28'; K. Bagheri (yellow card) (yellow-red card) 81'		O. Ravankhah 5'; B. Koushki (yellow card) (yellow-red card) 86'	Stadium: Azadi Stadium; Attendance: 80,000; Referee: (Spain) Bernardino González Vázquez

11 April 2008 27	Esteghlal Ahvaz	4 – 1	Persepolis	Ahvaz
	R. Bigdeli 40'; M. Bijani 49'; R. Taheri 65'; M. Fa'al 90+2'; M. Haghipour (red card) 51'	4-1	F. Ashoubi 90+3'; H. Kaebi (red card) 51'	Stadium: Takhti Stadium; Attendance: 25,000; Referee: Mohsen Ghahremani

18 April 2008 28	Persepolis	2 – 0	Malavan	Tehran
	M. Khalili 64'; A. Nikbakht 76' (pen.)			Stadium: Azadi Stadium; Attendance: 45,000; Referee: Saeid Mozaffari Zadeh

24 April 2008 29	Mes Kerman	0 – 0	Persepolis	Kerman
		0-0	H. Kaebi (yellow card) (yellow-red card) 78'	Stadium: Shahid Bahonar Stadium; Attendance: 15,000; Referee: Masoud Moradi

30 April 2008 30	Persepolis	5 – 0	Shirin Faraz	Tehran
	M. Khalili 20', 45'; M. Nosrati 28'; M. Dragičević 59'; F. Kheirkhah 70'	5-0	M. Mohammadian (yellow card) (yellow-red card) 40'	Stadium: Azadi Stadium; Attendance: 30,000; Referee: Rahim Rahimi Moghadam

3 May 2008 31	Saipa	0 – 1	Persepolis	Tehran
		0-1	M. Memarzadeh 84' (o.g.)	Stadium: Azadi Stadium; Attendance: 60,000; Referee: Mohsen Torky

11 May 2008 32	Persepolis	1 – 1	Bargh Shiraz	Tehran
	M. Khalili 44'	1-1	F. Abedi 57'	Stadium: Azadi Stadium; Attendance: 70,000; Referee: Hedayat Mombeini

14 May 2008 33	Saba Battery	1 – 4	Persepolis	Tehran
	Gh. Rezaei 42'	1-4	K. Bagheri 19'; M. Khalili 63', 69'; P. Nouri 73'	Stadium: Azadi Stadium; Attendance: 90,000; Referee: Khodadad Afsharian

17 May 2008 34	Persepolis	2 – 1	Sepahan	Tehran
	M. Khalili 17', 45'; S. Heydari 90+6'; M. Zarei (red card) 90+6'	2-1	E. Hajsafi 30'	Stadium: Azadi Stadium; Attendance: 110,000; Referee: Saeid Mozaffari Zadeh

==== Score overview ====
Win Draw Loss

Opposition	Home score	Away score	Aggregate score
Aboomoslem	3–3	0–3	6–3
Bargh Shiraz	1–1	0–1	2–1
Esteghlal	1–1	1–1	2–2
Esteghlal Ahvaz	3–2	4–1	4–6
Malavan	2–0	1–1	3–1
Mes Kerman	1–0	0–0	1–0
Moghavemat	3–3	0–2	5–3
PAS	1–1	1–2	3–2
Paykan	2–1	1–2	4–2
Pegah	2–0	1–0	2–1
Rah Ahan	1–2	0–0	1–2
Saba Battery	2–2	1–4	6–3
Saipa	1–0	0–1	2–0
Sanat Naft	1–0	2–3	4–2
Sepahan	2–1	2–1	3–3
Shirin Faraz	5–0	0–0	5–0
Zob Ahan	2–1	2–0	2–3

==== Results by round ====
Round	1	2	3	4	5	6	7	8	9	10	11	12	13	14	15	16	17	18	19	20	21	22	23	24	25	26	27	28	29	30	31	32	33	34
Ground	A	H	A	H	H	H	A	H	A	H	A	H	A	H	A	H	A	H	A	H	A	A	A	H	A	H	A	H	A	H	A	H	A	H
Result	W	W	W	W	D	D	W	W	D	W	D	W	D	W	W	D	L	W	L	D	W	L	W	D	L	D	L	W	D	W	W	D	W	W
Position	1	1	1	1	1	1	1	1	1	1	1	1	1	1	1	1	1	1	1	1	1	3	1	1	2	2	3	3	3	2	2	2	2	1

Updated to match(es) played on 17 May 2008. Source: "Ipl". August 2011.
A = Away; H = Home; W = Win; D = Draw; L = Loss

==== Results summary ====
Overall								Home						Away					
Pld	W	D	L	GF	GA	GD	Pts	W	D	L	GF	GA	GD	W	D	L	GF	GA	GD
34	18	11	5	55	34	+21	65	10	6	1	33	18	+15	8	5	4	22	16	+6

	GP	W	D	L	Pts	GF	GA	GD
In Azadi Studium	22	13	8	1	47	41	21	+20
In Other Studiums	12	5	3	4	18	14	13	+1

Last updated: 15 May 2008.
Source: "Ipl". August 2011.

=== League standings ===
Pos	Team	Pld	W	D	L	GF	GA	GD	Pts	Qualification or relegation
1	Persepolis (C)	34	18	11	5	55	34	+21	59 (Note: Persepolis was deducted 6 points in issued by FIFA.)	Qualification for the 2009 AFC Champions League
2	Sepahan	34	17	10	7	53	38	+15	58 (Note: Sepahan was deducted 3 points in issued by Iranian Football Federation.)	Qualification for the 2009 AFC Champions League
3	Saba	34	13	13	8	41	37	+4	52	Qualification for the 2009 AFC Champions League
4	Aboumoslem	34	14	8	12	37	37	0	50	
5	Pas Hamedan	34	11	16	7	36	28	+8	49	

Updated to match(es) played on 01 SEP 2018. Source: IPL Stats, Soccerway
Rules for classification: 1) Points; 2) Goal difference; 3) Goals scored.
(C) Champions

=== Persepolis goalscorers in IPL 2007/08 ===
Last updated May 17, 2008

Scorer	Goals
(Iran) Mohsen Khalili	18
(Iran) Alireza Vahedi Nikbakht	9
(Iran) Abbas Aghaei	7
(Iran) Hossein Badamaki	3
(Iran) Farzad Ashoobi	3
(Croatia) Mate Dragičević	3
(Iran) Karim Bagheri	3
(Iran) Sepehr Heidari	3
(Iran) Ehsan Khorsandi	1
(Iran) Faraz Fatemi	1
(Iran) Farhad Kheirkhah	1
(Iran) Mohamad Nosrati	1
(Iran) Pejman Noori	1
Own Goals	1
Total goals scored	55

- Top scorer of competition (shared with Hadi Asghari)

== Hazfi Cup ==
=== Matches ===
Date Round	Home	Score	Away	Location

22 November 2007 R64	Sanat Naft	2 – 3	Persepolis	Abadan
	L. Pimenta 7' (pen.); S. Mirghorbani 90+3'		F. Fatemi 14'; A. Aghaei 58'; A. Nikbakht 85'	Stadium: Takhti Stadium; Referee: Mohsen Torky

17 December 2007 R32	Persepolis	4 – 1	Petroshimi Tabriz	Tehran
	H. Badamaki 28'; A. Nikbakht 39' 71'; K. Bagheri 61'		A. Taghipour 41'	Stadium: Azadi Stadium; Referee: Touraj Haghverdi

24 December 2007 R16	Pas	3 – 0	Persepolis	Hamedan
	M. Jafarpour 36', 58', 82'		F. Ashoubi (red card) 66'; H. Badamaki (red card) 86'; A. Nikbakht (red card) 89'; M. Nosrati (red card) 90'	Stadium: Qods Stadium; Referee: Mohsen Torky

Scorer	Goals
(Iran) Alireza Vahedi Nikbakht	3
(Iran) Abbas Aghaei	1
(Iran) Faraz Fatemi	1
(Iran) Karim Bagheri	1
(Iran) Hossein Badamaki	1
Total goals scored	7

== Goalkeeping ==
			League			Hazfi Cup			Total		
No	N	Name	M	GA	CS	M	GA	CS	M	GA	CS
1	(Iran)	Mehdi Vaezi	22	14	12	1	3	0	23	17	12
22	(Iran)	Hassan Roudbarian	11	17	1	2	3	0	13	20	1
30	(Iran)	Farshid Karimi	1	3	0	–	–	–	1	3	0
Total			34	34	13	3	6	0	37	40	13

== Club ==
=== Kit ===
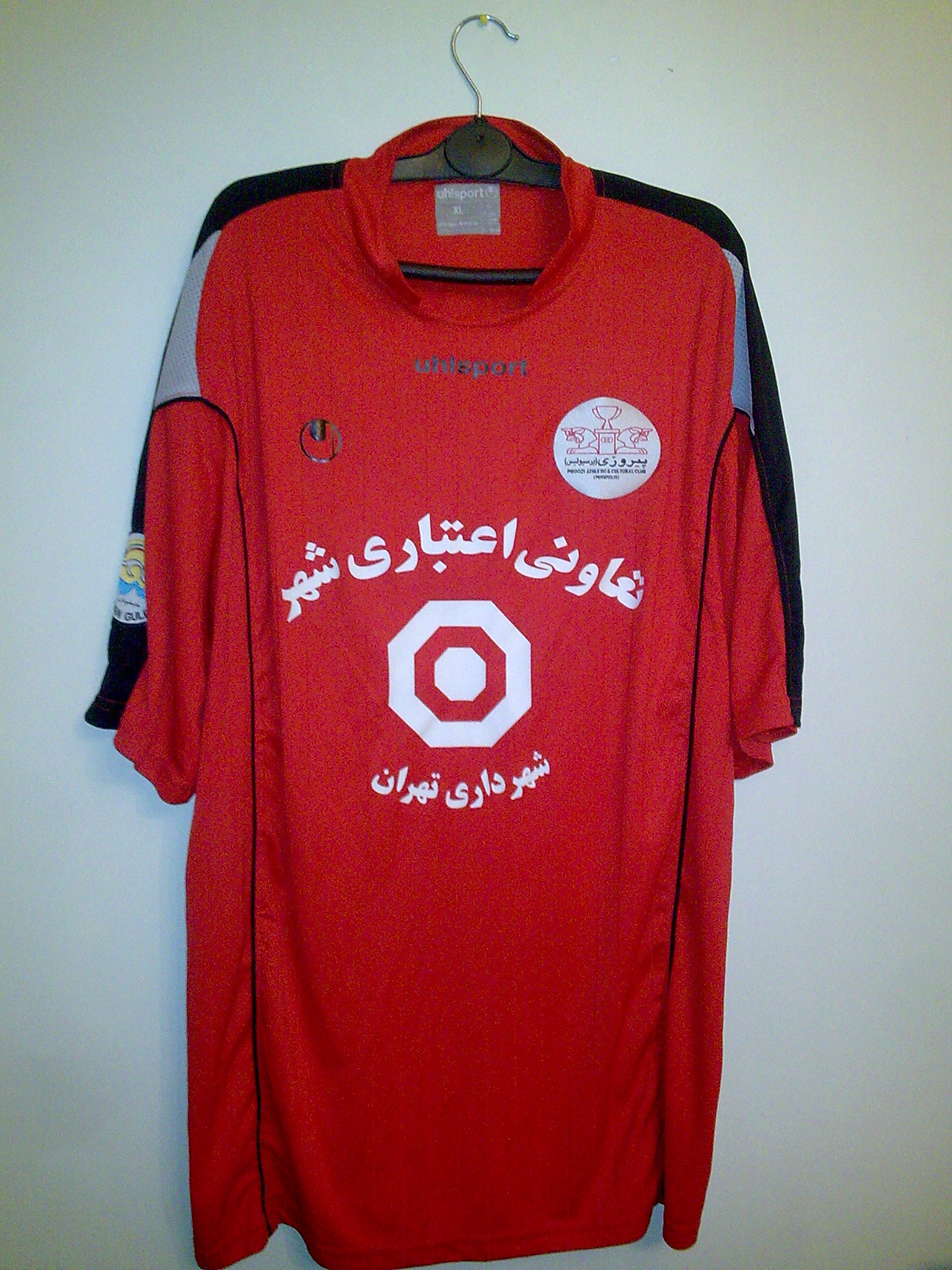
Home Kit

Supplier: Uhlsport
Sponsor(s): City Credit Cooperative(CCC)

Home Kit	Away Kit	Third Kit

=== Club managers ===
Position	Name	Nat
Head coach	Afshin Ghotbi	(Iran) (United States)
First team coach	Hamid Estili	(Iran)
Fitness coach	Alireza Marzban	(Iran) (Germany)
Goalkeeping coach	Saeid Azizian	(Iran)
Team doctor	Farid Zarineh	(Iran)

=== Club officials ===
Position	Name
President	(Iran) Habib Kashani
Vice President	(Iran) Mahmoud Khordbin
General Secretary	(Iran) Gholam Reaza Ahmadi
Media Officer	(Iran) Abbas AliPour
Financial Officer	(Iran) Ali Akbar Ashouri
Juridical Officer	(Iran) Mostafa ShokriPour
Cultural Officer	(Iran) Hojat'ol eslam Seyyed Mohammad Kohnegi
Chairman & Spokesman of board of Directors	(Iran) Hassan Bayadi
Ground (capacity and dimensions)	Azadi Stadium (90,000 / 100 x 60 m)

=== Captains ===
1. (Iran) Karim Bagheri
2. (Iran) Sheys Rezaei
3. (Iran) Pejman Nouri

== Squad changes during 2007/08 season ==
=== In ===
No.	Position	Player	Age	Moving from	Transfer Window
3	DF	(Iran) Sepehr Heidari	27	(Iran) Zob Ahan	Summer
5	DF	(Iran) Nabiollah Bagheriha	28	(Iran) Teraktor Sazi	Summer
9	FW	(Iran) Mohsen Khalili	27	(Iran) Saipa	Summer
19	MF	(Iran) Bahador Abdi	25	(Iran) Sorkhpooshan Delvar Afzar	Summer
20	DF	(Iran) Mohammad Nosrati	26	(Iran) Pas	Summer
22	GK	(Iran) Hassan Roudbarian	29	(Iran) Pas	Summer
26	MF	(Iran) Hamidreza Ali Asgari	17	(Iran) Fajr Sepah	Summer
27	MF	(Iran) Abbas Aghaei	30	(Iran) Pas	Summer
28	FW	(Iran) Farhad Kheirkhah	-	(Iran) Sorkhpooshan Delvar Afzar	Summer
29	DF	(Iran) Ziaeddin Niknafs	-	Youth system	Summer
	FW	(Iran) Kamyar Ghanbari	-	(Iran) Pas (Youth system)	Summer
16	MF	(Paraguay) Jorge Aranda	22	(Paraguay) Cerro Porteño	Winter
24	FW	(Croatia) Mate Dragičević	28	(Australia) Perth Glory	Winter
12	FW	(Iran) Hossein Kaebi	22	(England) Leicester City	Winter

=== Out ===
No.	Position	Player	Age	Moving to	Transfer Window
3	DF	(Iran) Abolfazl Hajizadeh	22	(Iran) Saba Battery - Free Transfer	Summer
4	DF	(Syria) Tarek Jabban	32	(Syria) Al-Jaish - Free Transfer	Summer
5	DF	(Czech Republic) Robert Caha	31	(Iran) Shahin Bushehr	Summer
7	MF	(Iran) Mohammad Parvin	19	(Iran) Steel Azin - Free Transfer	Summer
9	DF	(Iran) Hossein Kaebi	22	(England) Leicester City - Undisclosed Fee	Summer
11	FW	(Iran) Mehrzad Madanchi	23	(United Arab Emirates) Al-Shaab	Summer
19	FW	(Iraq) Louay Salah Hassan	25	(Iraq) Arbil - Free Transfer	Summer
20	MF	(Iran) Davoud Seyed Abbasi	30	(Iran) Steel Azin - Free Transfer	Summer
21	MF	(Iran) Ebrahim Assadi	28	(Iran) Steel Azin - Free Transfer	Summer
23	FW	(Syria) Zyad Chaabo	29	(Syria) Al-Jaish - End of Loan	Summer
24	FW	(Iran) Dariush Rezaeian	-	(Iran) Nasaji Mazandaran - Free Transfer	Summer
26	MF	(Iran) Nima Ghavidel	23	(Iran) Nasaji Mazandaran - Free Transfer	Summer
