= 2008–09 Persepolis F.C. season =

Persepolis
2008-09 season
- Chairman: Dariush Mostafavi (until Jan 2009); Abbas Ansarifard
- Manager: Afshin Ghotbi (first 14 weeks) Afshin Peyrovani (till week 25) Nelo Vingada
- Persian Gulf Cup: 5th
- Hazfi Cup: Quarter-final
- AFC Champions League: Round of 16
- Top goalscorer: League: Ibrahima Touré (11); All: Ibrahima Touré (13)
- Highest home attendance: 95,225 v Bunyodkor (27 May 2009)
- Lowest home attendance: 1,000 v Rah Ahan (26 Apr 2009)
- Average home league attendance: 40,688
| Home colours | Away colours | Third colours |

The 2008–09 season was Persepolis's 8th season in the Pro League, and their 26th consecutive season in the top division of Iranian Football. They were also competing in the Hazfi Cup and AFC Champions League.

== Squad ==
=== Iran Pro League ===
Note: Flags indicate national team as defined under FIFA eligibility rules; some limited exceptions apply. Players may hold more than one non-FIFA nationality.

| No. | Pos. | Nation | Player |
|---|---|---|---|
| 1 | GK | IRI | Mehdi Vaezi |
| 2 | DF | IRI | Masoud Zarei |
| 3 | DF | IRI | Sepehr Heidari |
| 4 | DF | IRI | Alireza Mohammad |
| 5 | DF | IRI | Nabiollah Bagheriha |
| 6 | MF | IRI | Karim Bagheri (captain) |
| 7 | MF | IRI | Hossein Badamaki |
| 8 | MF | IRI | Ali Karimi (Vice-captain) |
| 9 | FW | IRI | Mohsen Khalili |
| 10 | MF | IRI | Alireza Vahedi Nikbakht |
| 11 | MF | IRI | Maziar Zare |
| 12 | DF | IRI | Ziaeddin Niknafs |
| 13 | GK | IRI | Alireza Haghighi |
| 14 | MF | IRI | Mojtaba Shiri |
| 15 | MF | IRI | Mohammad Alavi |
| 16 | MF | IRI | Mohammad Mansouri |

| No. | Pos. | Nation | Player |
|---|---|---|---|
| 17 | FW | SEN | Ibrahima Touré |
| 18 | MF | IRI | Pejman Nouri |
| 19 | FW | BRA | Paulo Roberto do Carmo |
| 20 | MF | IRI | Bahador Abdi |
| 21 | MF | SRB | Ivan Petrović |
| 22 | DF | IRI | Kamiar Ghanbari |
| 23 | GK | IRI | Misagh Memarzadeh |
| 24 | FW | IRI | Hadi Norouzi |
| 26 | MF | IRI | Hamidreza Aliasgari |
| 28 | FW | IRI | Farhad Kheirkhah |
| 29 | MF | IRI | Mehran Farziat |
| 30 | GK | IRI | Mohsen Eliasi |
| 32 | DF | TOG | Franck Atsou |
| 33 | DF | IRI | Rahman Rezaei |
| 44 | MF | IRI | Amirhossein Ipakchi |

== Persian Gulf Cup ==
=== Matches ===
| Date Round | Home | Score | Away | Location |

| 4 August 2008 1 | Saipa | 0 – 1 | Persepolis | Tehran |
| | | 0-1 | P. Nouri 42' | Stadium: Azadi Stadium; Attendance: 50,000; Referee: Hedayat Mombeini |

| 9 August 2008 2 | Persepolis | 3 – 1 | Pas | Tehran |
| | A. Nikbakht 35'; K. Bagheri 73', 90+1' | 3-1 | V. Ghafouri 13'; H. Omranzadeh (yellow card) (yellow-red card) 64' | Stadium: Azadi Stadium; Attendance: NA; Referee: Shahin Hajbabei |

| 17 August 2008 3 | Malavan | 2 – 2 | Persepolis | Anzali |
| | J. Rafkhaei 52', 78' (pen.) | 2-2 | A. Nikbakht 57', 64' | Stadium: Takhti Stadium; Attendance: 7,000; Referee: Mohsen Ghahremani |

| 24 August 2008 4 | Persepolis | 2 – 2 | Zob Ahan | Tehran |
| | I. Touré 29'; K. Bagheri 37' | 2-2 | M. Khalatbari 16', 77' | Stadium: Azadi Stadium; Attendance: 40,000; Referee: Saeid Bakhshizadeh |

| 29 August 2008 5 | Foolad | 3 – 2 | Persepolis | Ahvaz |
| | A. Alenemeh 15'; S. Sarlak 23'; M. Ghazi 49' | 3-2 | P. do Carmo 31'; H. Norouzi 86' | Stadium: Takhti Stadiumi; Attendance: 30,000; Referee: Ahmad Salehi |

| 11 September 2008 6 | Persepolis | 0 – 1 | Mes Kerman | Tehran |
| | | 0-1 | R. Ataei 80' | Stadium: Azadi Stadium; Attendance: 70,000; Referee: Masoud Moradi |

| 16 September 2008 7 | Payam Mashhad | 1 – 2 | Persepolis | Mashhad |
| | Sh. Arifi 44' | 1-2 | A. Nikbakht 12'; K. Bagheri 55' | Stadium: Samen Stadium; Attendance: 40,000; Referee: Yadollah Jahanbazi |

| 25 September 2008 8 | Persepolis | 2 – 0 | Damash Gilan | Tehran |
| | K. Bagheri 35'; I. Touré 79' | 2-0 | | Stadium: Azadi Stadium; Attendance: 95,000; Referee: Saeid Mozaffari Zadeh |

| 3 October 2008 9 | Persepolis | 1 – 1 | Esteghlal | Tehran |
| | A. Karimi 87' | 1-1 | A. Borhani 46' | Stadium: Azadi Stadium; Attendance: 95,000; Referee: (Kuwait) Saad Kamil Al-Fadhli |

| 8 October 2008 10 | Aboumoslem | 4 – 3 | Persepolis | Mashhad |
| | M. Baou 13', 27'; D. Daneshdoost 71'; S. Khani 79' | 4-3 | A. Karimi 40', 47', 87' | Stadium: Samen Stadium; Attendance: 40,000; Referee: Khodadad Afsharian |

| 18 October 2008 11 | Persepolis | 3 – 1 | Bargh Shiraz | Tehran |
| | A. Karimi 24'; K. Bagheri 39'; A. Nikbakht 76' (pen.) | 3-1 | M. Nazarzadeh 73' | Stadium: Azadi Stadium; Attendance: 60,000; Referee: Yadollah Jahanbazi |

| 26 October 2008 12 | Persepolis | 3 – 2 | Sepahan | Tehran |
| | K. Bagheri 17'; A. Nikbakht 44', 64' | 3-2 | E. Mohammed 28', 34'; H. Aghily (yellow card) (yellow-red card) 77' | Stadium: Azadi Stadium; Attendance: 60,000; Referee: Mohsen Torky |

| 30 October 2008 13 | Moghavemat Sepasi | 1 – 0 | Persepolis | Shiraz |
| | K. Bagheri 72' (o.g.) | 1-0 | | Stadium: Hafezieh Stadium; Attendance: 20,000; Referee: Mahmoud Rafiei |

| 6 November 2008 14 | Persepolis | 2 – 2 | Saba | Tehran |
| | A. Nikbakht 18', 66' | 2-2 | F. Fazli 57', 74' | Stadium: Azadi Stadium; Attendance: 40,000; Referee: Rahim Rahimi Moghadam |

| 22 November 2008 15 | Paykan | 2 – 2 | Persepolis | Qazvin |
| | I. Heydari 32'; M. Tahmasebi 37'; A. Ghorbani (red card) 55' | 2-2 | I. Touré 3', 52' | Stadium: Shahid Rajai Stadium; Attendance: 7,000; Referee: Hedayat Mombeini |

| 22 November 2008 16 | Persepolis | 1 – 0 | Esteghlal Ahvaz | Tehran |
| | N. Bagheriha 83' | 1-0 | | Stadium: Azadi Stadium; Attendance: 30,000; Referee: Saeid Mozaffari Zadeh |

| 4 December 2008 17 | Rah Ahan | 1 – 2 | Persepolis | Tehran |
| | D. Haghi 69' (pen.) | 1-2 | I. Touré 3'; S. Heydari 71' | Stadium: Azadi Stadium; Attendance: 40,000; Referee: Khodadad Afsharian |

| 9 December 2008 18 | Persepolis | 1 – 1 | Saipa | Tehran |
| | I. Touré 25' | 1-1 | O. Sharifinasab 33' | Stadium: Azadi Stadium; Attendance: 60,000; Referee: Rahim Rahimi Moghadam |

| 13 December 2008 19 | Pas | 0 – 3 | Persepolis | Hamedan |
| | O. Khouraj (yellow card) (yellow-red card) 90+3' | 0-3 | I. Touré 64', 80'; H. Badamaki 68' | Stadium: Qods Stadium; Attendance: 8,000; Referee: Yadollah Jahanbazi |

| 29 December 2008 20 | Persepolis | 0 – 2 | Malavan | Tehran |
| | | 0-2 | A. Ramezani 54'; M. Heidari 84' | Stadium: Azadi Stadium; Attendance: 20,000; Referee: Alireza Faghani |

| 3 January 2009 21 | Zob Ahan | 3 – 1 | Persepolis | Fuladshahr |
| | M. Khalatbari 30', 46' (red card) 47'; M. Salsali 65'; E. Farhadi (red card) 84' | 3-1 | I. Touré 68' (pen.) | Stadium: Fuladshahr Stadium; Attendance: 15,000; Referee: Hedayat Mombeini |

| 16 January 2009 22 | Persepolis | 1 – 0 | Foolad | Tehran |
| | M. Zare 28' (pen.); I. Touré (yellow card) (yellow-red card) 42' | 1-0 | | Stadium: Azadi Stadium; Attendance: 20,000; Referee: Mahmoud Rafiei |

| 22 January 2009 23 | Mes Kerman | 1 – 1 | Persepolis | Kerman |
| | R. Bigdeli 61'; F. Hosseinkhani (red card) | 1-1 | P. Nouri 28' | Stadium: Shahid Bahonar Stadium; Attendance: 15,000; Referee: Rahim Rahimi Moghadam |

| 31 January 2009 24 | Persepolis | 1 – 0 | Payam Mashhad | Tehran |
| | R. Rezaei (yellow card) (yellow-red card) 90'; I. Petrović 90+1' (pen.); A. Nikbakht (yellow card) (yellow-red card) 90+3' | 1-0 | M. Arzani (yellow card) (yellow-red card) | Stadium: Azadi Stadium; Attendance: 30,000; Referee: Alireza Faghani |

| 4 February 2009 25 | Damash Gilan | 1 – 2 | Persepolis | Kerman |
| | A. Alves 34' | 1-2 | I. Touré 8'; K. Bagheri 62' | Stadium: Sardar Jangal Stadium; Attendance: 15,000; Referee: Hedayat Mombeini |

| 13 February 2009 26 | Esteghlal | 1 – 1 | Persepolis | Tehran |
| | M. Jabbari 56' | 1-1 | M. Zare 90+3' (pen.) | Stadium: Azadi Stadium; Attendance: 90,000; Referee: Mohsen Torky |

| 17 February 2009 27 | Persepolis | 1 – 0 | Aboumoslem | Tehran |
| | K. Bagheri 48' | 1-0 | Sh. Gordan (red card) 55' | Stadium: Azadi Stadium; Attendance: 20,000; Referee: Saeid Mozaffari Zadeh |

| 21 February 2009 28 | Bargh Shiraz | 1 – 1 | Persepolis | Shiraz |
| | S. Zare 45+3' (pen.); A. Honarvar (yellow card) (yellow-red card) 89' | 1-1 | M. Zare 27' (pen.) | Stadium: Hafezieh Stadium; Attendance: 25,000; Referee: Alborz Hajipour |

| 27 February 2009 29 | Sepahan | 0 – 0 | Persepolis | Fuladshahr |
| | | 0-0 | | Stadium: Fuladshahr Stadium; Attendance: 25,000; Referee: Khodadad Afsharian |

| 3 March 2009 30 | Persepolis | 1 – 2 | Moghavemat Sepasi | Tehran |
| | P. Nouri 40' | 1-2 | S. Koohnavard 53'; M. Sabri 59' | Stadium: Azadi Stadium; Attendance: 10,000; Referee: Mohsen Ghahremani |

| 3 April 2009 31 | Saba | 2 – 0 | Persepolis | Qom |
| | M. Yousefi 29' (pen.); M. Kheiri 39' | 2-0 | | Stadium: Yadegar-e Emam Stadium; Attendance: 10,000; Referee: Mohsen Torky |

| 12 April 2009 32 | Persepolis | 2 – 1 | Paykan | Tehran |
| | M. Khalili 40'; M. Zare 50' (pen.) | 2-1 | I. Heydari 86' | Stadium: Azadi Stadium; Attendance: 15,000; Referee: Khodadad Afsharian |

| 16 April 2009 33 | Esteghlal Ahvaz | 2 – 1 | Persepolis | Ahvaz |
| | H. Khanifar 73'; M. fa'al 90+5' | 2-1 | I. Touré 53'; M. Zare (yellow card) (yellow-red card) 86' | Stadium: Takhti Stadiumi; Attendance: 10,000; Referee: Yadollah Jahanbazi |

| 26 April 2009 34 | Persepolis | 2 – 0 | Rah Ahan | Tehran |
| | M. Mansouri 56'; H. Norouzi 68' | 2-0 | | Stadium: Azadi Stadium; Attendance: 1,000; Referee: Navid Mozaffari |

==== Score overview ====
Win Draw Loss

| Opposition | Home score | Away score | Aggregate score |
|---|---|---|---|
| Aboomoslem | 1–0 | 4–3 | 4–4 |
| Bargh Shiraz | 3–1 | 1–1 | 4–2 |
| Damash | 2–0 | 1–2 | 4–1 |
| Esteghlal | 1–1 | 1–1 | 2–2 |
| Esteghlal Ahvaz | 1–0 | 2–1 | 2–2 |
| Foolad | 1–0 | 3–2 | 3–3 |
| Malavan | 0–2 | 2–2 | 2–4 |
| Mes Kerman | 0–1 | 1–1 | 1–2 |
| Moghavemat | 1–2 | 1–0 | 1–3 |
| PAS | 3–1 | 0–3 | 6–1 |
| Payam Mashhad | 1–0 | 1–2 | 3–1 |
| Paykan | 2–1 | 2–2 | 4–3 |
| Rah Ahan | 2–0 | 1–2 | 4–1 |
| Saba | 2–2 | 2–0 | 2–4 |
| Saipa | 1–1 | 0–1 | 2–1 |
| Sepahan | 3–2 | 0–0 | 3–2 |
| Zob Ahan | 2–2 | 3–1 | 3–5 |

=== Results by round ===
| Round | 1 | 2 | 3 | 4 | 5 | 6 | 7 | 8 | 9 | 10 | 11 | 12 | 13 | 14 | 15 | 16 | 17 | 18 | 19 | 20 | 21 | 22 | 23 | 24 | 25 | 26 | 27 | 28 | 29 | 30 | 31 | 32 | 33 | 34 |
|---|---|---|---|---|---|---|---|---|---|---|---|---|---|---|---|---|---|---|---|---|---|---|---|---|---|---|---|---|---|---|---|---|---|---|
| Ground | A | H | A | H | A | H | A | H | H | A | H | H | A | H | A | H | A | H | A | H | A | H | A | H | A | A | H | A | A | H | A | H | A | H |
| Result | W | W | D | D | L | L | W | W | D | L | W | W | L | D | D | W | W | D | W | L | L | W | D | W | W | D | W | D | D | L | L | W | L | W |
| Position | 3 | 2 | 3 | 3 | 6 | 5 | 5 | 3 | 5 | 6 | 5 | 4 | 4 | 4 | 6 | 5 | 4 | 4 | 3 | 3 | 4 | 4 | 4 | 3 | 3 | 3 | 3 | 3 | 3 | 4 | 6 | 5 | 5 | 5 |

Updated to match(es) played on 26 Apr 2009. Source: "Ipl".
A = Away; H = Home; W = Win; D = Draw; L = Loss

=== Results summary ===
| Overall | | | | | | | | Home | | | | | | Away | | | | | |
| Pld | W | D | L | GF | GA | GD | Pts | W | D | L | GF | GA | GD | W | D | L | GF | GA | GD |
|---|---|---|---|---|---|---|---|---|---|---|---|---|---|---|---|---|---|---|---|
| 34 | 15 | 10 | 9 | 50 | 41 | +9 | 55 | 10 | 4 | 3 | 26 | 16 | +10 | 5 | 6 | 6 | 24 | 25 | −1 |

| | GP | W | D | L | Pts | GF | GA | GD |
|---|---|---|---|---|---|---|---|---|
| In Azadi Studium | 20 | 12 | 5 | 3 | 41 | 30 | 18 | +12 |
| In Other Stadiums | 14 | 3 | 5 | 6 | 14 | 20 | 23 | -3 |

Source: "Ipl".

=== League standings ===
| Pos | Team | Pld | W | D | L | GF | GA | GD | Pts | Qualification or relegation |
|---|---|---|---|---|---|---|---|---|---|---|
| 3 | Mes | 34 | 17 | 10 | 7 | 54 | 36 | +18 | 61 | Qualification for the 2010 AFC Champions League |
| 4 | Sepahan | 34 | 14 | 14 | 6 | 46 | 34 | +12 | 56 | Qualification for the 2010 AFC Champions League |
| 5 | Persepolis | 34 | 15 | 10 | 9 | 50 | 41 | +9 | 55 | |
| 6 | Saba | 34 | 12 | 17 | 5 | 49 | 36 | +13 | 53 | |
| 7 | Foolad | 34 | 13 | 11 | 10 | 50 | 41 | +9 | 50 | |

Updated to match(es) played on 1 September 2018. Source: IPL Stats, Soccerway
Rules for classification: 1) Points; 2) Goal difference; 3) Goals scored.

=== League Statistics ===
==== Goal scorers ====
11

- (Senegal) Ibrahima Touré

9

- (Iran) Alireza Vahedi Nikbakht
- (Iran) Karim Bagheri

5

- (Iran) Ali Karimi

4

- (Iran) Maziar Zare

3

- (Iran) Pejman Nouri

2

- (Iran) Hadi Norouzi

1

- (Iran) Mohsen Khalili
- (Iran) Hossein Badamaki
- (Iran) Mohammad Mansouri
- (Iran) Sepehr Heidari
- (Iran) Nabiollah Bagheriha
- (Brazil) Paulo Roberto do Carmo
- (Serbia) Ivan Petrović

==== Assists ====
9

- (Serbia) Ivan Petrović

6

- (Iran) Ali Karimi

5

- (Iran) Alireza Vahedi Nikbakht

4

- (Iran) Karim Bagheri

1

- (Iran) Mohammad Mansouri
- (Iran) Pejman Nouri
- (Iran) Alireza Mohammad
- (Iran) Mojtaba Shiri
- (Iran) Sepehr Heidari
- (Iran) Hamidreza Ali Asgari
- (Senegal) Ibrahima Touré
- (Brazil) Paulo Roberto do Carmo

==== Cards ====
| Player | Yellow card | Yellow card Red card | Red card |
|---|---|---|---|
| (Iran) Maziar Zare | 8 | 0 | 1 |
| (Iran) Alireza Vahedi Nikbakht | 7 | 0 | 1 |
| (Iran) Karim Bagheri | 7 | 0 | 0 |
| (Iran) Ali Karimi | 7 | 0 | 0 |
| (Senegal) Ibrahima Toure | 6 | 1 | 0 |
| (Iran) Pejman Nouri | 6 | 0 | 0 |
| (Serbia) Ivan Petrović | 6 | 0 | 0 |
| (Iran) Rahman Rezaei | 4 | 1 | 0 |
| (Iran) Alireza Mohammad | 2 | 0 | 0 |
| (Iran) Mojtaba Shiri | 2 | 0 | 0 |
| (Iran) Sepehr Heidari | 2 | 0 | 0 |
| (Iran) Alireza Haghighi | 2 | 0 | 0 |
| (Iran) Bahador Abdi | 1 | 0 | 0 |
| (Iran) Hamidreza Ali Asgari | 1 | 0 | 0 |
| (Iran) Mehdi Vaezi | 1 | 0 | 0 |
| (Iran) Hossein Badamaki | 1 | 0 | 0 |
| (Brazil) Paulo Roberto do Carmo | 1 | 0 | 0 |

==== Matches played ====
28

- (Iran) Pejman Noori

26

- (Iran) Sepehr Heidari

== Hazfi Cup ==
=== Matches ===
| Date Round | Home | Score | Away | Location |

| 30 November 2008 R32 | Sanaye Talaei Semnan | 1 – 3 | Persepolis | Semnan |
| | H. Mahmoudi 5' | | H. Norouzi 3'; I. Touré 64'; H. Aliasgari 90+3' | Stadium: Takhti Stadium; Referee: Hossein Asadi |

| 30 April 2009 R16 | Persepolis | 1 – 0 | Sepahan | Tehran |
| | M. Zare 12', (penalty missed) 75' | | | Stadium: Azadi Stadium; Attendance: 70,000; Referee: Mohsen Torky |

| 10 May 2009 Quarter-final | Pas | 2 – 1 | Persepolis | Hamedan |
| | E. Joseph 12', (red card) 68'; M. Gholami 31'; V. Aliabadi (red card) 79' | | B. Abdi 80' | Stadium: Qods Stadium; Attendance: 8,000; Referee: Alireza Faghani |

=== Hazfi Cup Statistics ===
Last updated Dec 9 2008

==== Goalscorers ====
1

- (Iran) Hadi Norouzi
- (Iran) Hamidreza Ali Asgari
- (Iran) Maziar Zare
- (Iran) Bahador Abdi
- (Senegal) Ibrahima Touré

==== Goalassistants ====
1

- (Iran) Ziaeddin Niknafs
- (Iran) Mojtaba Shiri
- (Senegal) Ibrahima Touré

==== Cards ====
| Player | Yellow card | Yellow card Red card | Red card |
|---|---|---|---|
| (Iran) Ziaeddin Niknafs | 1 | 0 | 0 |
| (Iran) Mohammad Mansouri | 1 | 0 | 0 |
| (Iran) Ali Karimi | 1 | 0 | 0 |
| (Iran) Maziar Zare | 1 | 0 | 0 |
| (Iran) Farhad Kheirkhah | 1 | 0 | 0 |
| (Senegal) Ibrahima Touré | 1 | 0 | 0 |

== AFC Champions League ==
=== Group B ===
| Pos | Team | Pld | W | D | L | GF | GA | GD | Pts | Qualification | PRS | SHB | GHA | SHA |
|---|---|---|---|---|---|---|---|---|---|---|---|---|---|---|
| 1 | (Iran) Persepolis | 4 | 2 | 1 | 1 | 5 | 6 | −1 | 7 | Advance to knockout stage | — | 1–0 | 3–1 | ~~3–1~~ |
| 2 | (Saudi Arabia) Al-Shabab | 4 | 2 | 1 | 1 | 4 | 2 | +2 | 7 | Advance to knockout stage | 0–0 | — | 1–0 | ~~5–0~~ |
| 3 | (Qatar) Al-Gharafa | 4 | 1 | 0 | 3 | 7 | 8 | −1 | 3 | | 5–1 | 1–3 | — | |
| 4 | (United Arab Emirates) Sharjah (Note: Sharjah were found guilty of fielding an ineligible player Abdelaziz Mohamed Al Mazam during the team’s AFC Champions League match against Al Shabab of Saudi Arabia on 8.4.09. Thus, Al Sharjah were fined USD 4000 and the match was awarded to Al Shabab 3-0.) | 0 | 0 | 0 | 0 | 0 | 0 | 0 | 0 | Withdrew (Note: Sharjah withdrew from the competition with two games remaining. Their results were expunged.) | | ~~1–3~~ | ~~0–2~~ | — |

Source: WorldFootball.net
Notes:
- Persepolis is above of Al-Shabab because of head to head points; Persepolis 4, Al-Shabab 1

=== Matches ===
| Date Round | Home | Score | Away | Location |

| March 10, 2009 G1 | Persepolis (Iran) | 3–1 | (United Arab Emirates) Sharjah | Tehran |
| 15:00 UTC+03:00 | A. Karimi 27'; A. Vahedi Nikbakht 30'; H. Norouzi 34' | (Report) | A. Darweesh 54' | Stadium: Azadi Stadium; Attendance: 55,121; Referee: (Uzbekistan) Valentin Kovalenko |

| March 17, 2009 G2 | Al-Shabab (Saudi Arabia) | 0–0 | (Iran) Persepolis | Riyadh |
| 21:00 UTC+03:30 | | Report | | Stadium: King Fahd Stadium; Attendance: 9,000; Referee: (South Korea) Choi Myung-Yong |

| April 8, 2009 G3 | Persepolis (Iran) | 3–1 | (Qatar) Al-Gharafa | Tehran |
| 16:00 UTC+03:00 | Zare 36' (pen.); Touré 45'; Nikbakht 48' | Report | Fernandão 69' | Stadium: Azadi Stadium; Attendance: 53,204; Referee: (Australia) Matthew Breeze |

| April 21, 2009 G4 | Al-Gharafa (Qatar) | 5–1 | (Iran) Persepolis | Doha |
| 20:00 UTC+03:30 | Fernandão 8'; Clemerson 43' 45+2' 81'; Nashat Akram 69' | Report | Karimi 76' | Stadium: Al-Gharafa Stadium; Attendance: 1,000; Referee: (Japan) Yuichi Nishimura |

| May 6, 2009 G5 | Sharjah (United Arab Emirates) | Cancelled | (Iran) Persepolis | Sharjah |
| 19:30 UTC+03:30 | | | | Stadium: Sharjah Stadium |

| May 20, 2009 G6 | Persepolis (Iran) | 1–0 | (Saudi Arabia) Al-Shabab | Tehran |
| 17:00 UTC+03:00 | Khalili 46' | Report | | Stadium: Azadi Stadium; Attendance: 31,321; Referee: (Japan) Minoru Tojo |

==== Round of 16 ====
| May 27, 2009 | Persepolis (Iran) | 0–1 | (Uzbekistan) Bunyodkor | Tehran |
| 17:00 UTC+03:00 | | Report | Rivaldo 41' (pen.) | Stadium: Azadi Stadium; Attendance: 95,225; Referee: (South Korea) Kim Dong-Jin |

=== Scorers in ACLeague 2009 ===
==== Goalscorers ====
2

- (Iran) Alireza Vahedi Nikbakht
- (Iran) Ali Karimi

1

- (Iran) Hadi Norouzi
- (Iran) Maziar Zare
- (Iran) Mohsen Khalili
- (Senegal) Ibrahima Touré

==== Goalassistants ====
1

- (Iran) Alireza Vahedi Nikbakht
- (Iran) Mojtaba Shiri
- (Iran) Alireza Mohammad
- (Senegal) Ibrahima Touré
- (Serbia) Ivan Petrović

==== Cards ====
| Player | Yellow card | Yellow card Red card | Red card |
|---|---|---|---|
| (Iran) Alireza Vahedi Nikbakht | 3 | 0 | 0 |
| (Iran) Hadi Norouzi | 2 | 0 | 0 |
| (Iran) Maziar Zare | 2 | 0 | 0 |
| (Iran) Sepehr Heidari | 1 | 0 | 0 |
| (Iran) Ali Karimi | 1 | 0 | 0 |
| (Iran) Bahador Abdi | 1 | 0 | 0 |
| (Iran) Pejman Nouri | 1 | 0 | 0 |
| (Iran) Farhad Kheirkhah | 1 | 0 | 0 |
| (Iran) Nabiollah Bagheriha | 1 | 0 | 0 |
| (Serbia) Ivan Petrović | 1 | 0 | 0 |
| (Senegal) Ibrahima Touré | 1 | 0 | 0 |

== Top scorers and assister in 2008-09 season ==
Last updated Apr 16 2008

=== Goalscorers ===
13

- (Senegal) Ibrahima Touré

11

- (Iran) Alireza Vahedi Nikbakht

9

- (Iran) Karim Bagheri

=== Assister ===
10

- (Serbia) Ivan Petrović

== Goalkeeping ==
| | | | League | | | Hazfi | | | Asian | | | Total | | |
| No | N | Name | M | GA | CS | M | GA | CS | M | GA | CS | M | GA | CS |
|---|---|---|---|---|---|---|---|---|---|---|---|---|---|---|
| 13 | (Iran) | Alireza Haghighi | 20 | 23 | 5 | 1 | 1 | 0 | 3 | 6 | 1 | 24 | 30 | 6 |
| 1 | (Iran) | Mehdi Vaezi | 13 | 17 | 3 | 2 | 2 | 1 | 1 | 1 | 0 | 16 | 20 | 4 |
| 23 | (Iran) | Misagh Memarzadeh | 2 | 1 | 1 | – | – | – | 2 | 1 | 1 | 4 | 2 | 2 |
| Total | | | 35* | 41 | 9 | 3 | 3 | 1 | 6* | 8 | 2 | 44 | 52 | 12 |
Last updated: 31 August 2020

- In the first-leg match against Pas in the league, Misagh Memarzadeh was injured in the first half, and Alireza Haghighi replaced him as a substitute.
- The second-leg match against Sharjah did not held because they withdrew from the remaining matches.

== Friendlies ==
- 4 September 2008

Persepolis 4-0 Naft Tehran
Pejman Nouri (yellow card)

- 9 November 2008

Persepolis 6-0 Armin Tehran

- 16 November 2008

Persepolis 1-0 Steel Azin
Hamidreza Ali Asgari 64'

- 24 December 2008

Persepolis 4-2 Sazan Rah Qom
Ivan Petrović 13'
Hadi Norouzi 46'
Farhad Kheirkhah 49'
Ibrahima Touré 80'

- 11 January 2009

Persepolis 8-0 Faraz Shemiran
Ibrahima Touré
Ibrahima Touré
Ibrahima Touré
Ibrahima Touré
Hadi Norouzi
Alireza Vahedi Nikbakht
Hamidreza Ali Asgari
Rahman Rezaei

=== Pre-season ===
==== Friendlies in Karegaran Stadium ====
- Persepolis 2-1 Armin Tehran

Farhad Kheirkhah
Hadi Norouzi

- Persepolis 1-1 Payam

Pejman Nouri 4'

- Persepolis 1-0 Sepasi

Hamidreza Ali Asgari 18'

==== UAE Camp (Dubai Iranian club) ====
In the middle of July the club programmed a camp in Spain, but it cancelled. after Ghotbi joined team, the club programmed a camp in Dubai from July 27 to July 31 replacing the Spain camp. After Persepolis was censured by Iran football medias because of this programming, censurers believed that Dubai hot temperature on July is not suitable for training, but Persepolis officials answered that the camp was so profitable for team. The camp included swimming, bodybuilding, players recreation and two friendly matches.

- 29 July 2008

Persepolis 4-0 (United Arab Emirates) Wind Dubai
Ibrahima Touré 28'
Farhad Kheirkhah 31'
Ibrahima Touré 51'
Ibrahima Touré 60'
Sepehr Heidari (red card)

- 30 July 2008

Persepolis 11-0 (United Arab Emirates) Fly Emirates
Farhad Kheirkhah
Farhad Kheirkhah
Farhad Kheirkhah
Farhad Kheirkhah
Hossein Badamaki
Hossein Badamaki
Pejman Nouri
Hadi Norouzi
Franck Atsou
Masoud Zarei (yellow card)
Masoud Zarei (yellow card) (red card)

== Club ==
=== Kit ===
Supplier: Uhlsport
Sponsor(s): Marrybrown

| Home Kit | Away Kit | AFC Kit |

Source: "Persepolis FC' current kit". Archived from the original on 12 March 2009.

=== Club managers ===
| Position | Name | Nat |
|---|---|---|
| Head coach | Nelo Vingada | (Portugal) |
| First team coach | Arnaldo Carvalho | (Portugal) |
| First team coach | Naim Sadavi | (Iran) |
| Fitness coach | Parviz Komasi | (Iran) |
| Goalkeeping coach | Ahmadreza Abedzadeh | (Iran) |
| Director | Mahmoud Khordbin | (Iran) |
| Team doctor | Dr. Farid Zarineh | (Iran) |

=== Club officials ===
| Position | Name |
|---|---|
| President | (Iran) Abbas Ansarifard |
| Director | (Iran) Mahmoud Khordbin |
| Academy President | (Iran) Fereydoun Moeini |
| Media Officer & International Committee President | (Iran) Morteza Hosseinzadeh Zarabi |
| Financial Officer | (Iran) Ali Akbar Ashouri |
| Juridical Officer | (Iran) Mostafa Shokripour |
| Cultural Officer | (Iran) Hojat'ol eslam Seyyed Mohammad Kohnegi |
| Chairman & Spokesman of board of Directors | (Iran) Majid Farrokhzadi |
| Ground (capacity and dimensions) | Azadi Stadium (90,000 / 100 x 60 m) |

Technical Committee members
(Iran) Homayoun Behzadi
(Iran) Hamid Jasemian
(Iran) Hossein Kalani
(Iran) Majid Farrokhzadi
(Iran) Afshin Peyrovani
(Iran) Fereydoun Moeini

Disciplinarian Committee members
(Iran) Ali Mohadesi

Board of Directions
(Iran) Abbas Ansarifard
(Iran) Mohammad Hossein Nejadfallah
(Iran) Majid Farrokhzadi
(Iran) Mohammad Akhoundi
(Iran) Hossein Hedayati

Munition Team
(Iran) Ghasem Abdolsamadi
(Iran) Asghar Norouzali
(Iran) Davoud Kashani

=== Captains ===
1. (Iran) Karim Bagheri
2. (Iran) Ali Karimi
3. (Iran) Pejman Nouri

== Squad changes during 2008/09 season ==
=== In ===
| No. | Position | Player | Age | Fee | Moving from | League | Transfer Window | Ref |
|---|---|---|---|---|---|---|---|---|
| 16 | MF | (Iran) Mohammad Mansouri | 24 | 180 Million Toman | Aboomoslem | Iran Pro League | Summer | |
| 4 | DF | (Iran) Alireza Mohammad | 26 | 150 Million Toman | Rah Ahan | Iran Pro League | Summer | |
| 14 | DF | (Iran) Mojtaba Shiri | 28 | 200 Million Toman | Esteghlal Ahvaz | Iran Pro League | Summer | |
| 17 | FW | (Senegal) Ibrahima Touré | 22 | 360 Million Toman | Paykan | Iran Pro League | Summer | |
| 21 | MF | (Serbia) Ivan Petrović | 28 | 280 Million Toman | Aboomoslem | Iran Pro League | Summer | |
| 23 | GK | (Iran) Misagh Memarzadeh | 25 | 180 Million Toman | Saipa | Iran Pro League | Summer | |
| 15 | MF | (Iran) Mohammad Alavi | 26 | 200 Million Toman | Pas Hamedan | Iran Pro League | Summer | |
| 32 | DF | (Togo) Franck Atsou | 29 | ? | Aboomoslem | Iran Pro League | Summer | |
| 11 | MF | (Iran) Maziar Zare | 23 | 300 Million Toman | Malavan | Iran Pro League | Summer | |
| 24 | FW | (Iran) Hadi Norouzi | 23 | 100 Million Toman | Damash | Azadegan League | Summer | |
| 19 | FW | (Brazil) Paulo Roberto do Carmo | 23 | 350,000 USD ($) | Centro Esportivo Nova Esperança | (Brazil) Campeonato Brasileiro Série C | Summer | |
| 8 | MF | (Iran) Ali Karimi | 29 | 310,000 USD ($) | Qatar SC | (Qatar) Qatari League | Summer | |
| 33 | DF | (Iran) Rahman Rezaei | 33 | 200 Million Toman | Livorno | (Italy) Serie A | Winter | |

=== Out ===
| No. | Position | Player | Age | Moving to | League | Transfer Window |
|---|---|---|---|---|---|---|
| 30 | GK | (Iran) Farshid Karimi | 32 | Pegah | Iran Pro League | Summer |
| 12 | DF | (Iran) Hossein Kaebi | 22 | Saipa | Iran Pro League | Summer |
| 27 | MF | (Iran) Abbas Aghaei | 30 | Saipa | Iran Pro League | Summer |
| 22 | GK | (Iran) Hassan Roudbarian | 30 | Paykan | Iran Pro League | Summer |
| 11 | FW | (Iran) Faraz Fatemi | 30 | Mes | Iran Pro League | Summer |
| 17 | MF | (Iran) Farzad Ashoubi | 28 | Mes | Iran Pro League | Summer |
| 4 | MF | (Iran) Mohammadreza Mamani | 26 | Pas H. | Iran Pro League | Summer |
| 13 | DF | (Iran) Sheys Rezaei | 24 | Saba | Iran Pro League | Summer |
| 16 | MF | (Paraguay) Jorge Aranda | 23 | Free agent | - | Summer |
| 24 | FW | (Croatia) Mate Dragičević | 28 | DAC Dunajská Streda | Slovak First League | Summer |
| 14 | FW | (Iran) Ehsan Khorsandi | 23 | Aboumoslem | Iran Pro League | Summer |
| 20 | DF | (Iran) Mohammad Nosrati | 26 | Al-Nasr | UAE League | Summer |
| 25 | MF | (Cameroon) Jacques Elong Elong | 23 | Sepahan | Iran Pro League | Winter |
| 19 | FW | (Brazil) Paulo Roberto do Carmo^{*} | 23 | Kowsar F.C. | Azadegan League | Winter |

^{*} He was fired from the club
