= 2013–14 S.C. Damash season =

Damash
2013–14 season
- Chairman: Amir Abedini
- Manager: Ali Nazarmohammadi
- Stadium: Dr. Azodi Stadium
- Iran Pro League: 17th
- Hazfi Cup: Round of 16
- Top goalscorer: League: Motevaselzadeh (8 goals); All: Motevaselzadeh (8 goals)
Home colours	Away colours

The 2013–14 season was Damash's 4th season in the Pro League, and their 3rd consecutive season in the top division of Iranian Football and 6th year in existence as a football club. They also competed in the Hazfi Cup. Damash was captained by Mohammad Reza Mahdavi.

== Player ==
=== First team squad ===
Last updated February 11, 2014

No.	Name	Nationality	Position	Age	Year(s) Signed	Signed from	Appearance(s)	Goal(s)
Goalkeepers
1	Milad Farahani	(Iran)	GK	25	2011	Paykan	56	0
22	Habib Dehghani	(Iran)	GK	30	2013	Sanat Naft	6	0
33	Behnam Laayeghifar	(Iran)	GK		2008	(Youth system)	4	0
Defenders
2	Mohammad Siah	(Iran)	DF, RB	28	2012	(Free Agent)	44	0
6	Morteza Ebrahimi	(Iran)	DF	32	2012	Saipa	26	0
8	Alireza Nazifkar	(Iran)	DF	29	2010	Nassaji	120	18
20	Mohamad Mokhtari	(Iran)	DF	31	2008	Pegah	103	3
21	Abouzar Rahimi	(Iran)	DF, LB	32	2012	Sanat Naft	68	0
26	Saeid Ghadami	(Iran)	LB	22	2013	Persepolis	12	1
29	Hadi Mohammadi	(Iran)	DF, RB	22	2012	Sanat Naft	28	0
Midfielders
4	Abolfazl Hajizadeh	(Iran)	CM, DMF, DF	31	2012	Shahrdari Tabriz	37	1
9	Hadi Sohrabi	(Iran)	CM, DMF	25	2012	Nassaji	72	1
11	Mohammad Reza Mahdavi	(Iran)	CM, AM	33	2010	Steel Azin	132	14
12	Mostafa Hajati	(Iran)	CM, LB	30	2008	Pegah	122	9
14	Reza Kardoust	(Iran)	CM	29	2013	Gahar Dorood	20	1
16	Rasoul Soroushnia	(Iran)	CM, LB	27	2012	Saba Qom	22	0
25	Mohammad Ali Rahimi	(Iran)	CM		2012	(Youth system)	3	0
Forwards
7	Amin Motevaselzadeh	(Iran)	CF	31	2012	Pas Hamedan	53	12
17	Masoud Hassanzadeh	(Iran)	CF, LW	22	2012	Mes Rafsanjan	26	4
18	Reza Almaskhane	(Iran)	CF	26	2008	Pegah	22	3
23	Saeid Mortazavi	(Iran)	CF	23	2012	(Youth system)	1	0
27	Rouhollah Seifollahi	(Iran)	CF, RW	23	2013	Persepolis	26	5
35	Hamid Khodabandelou	(Iran)	CF		2013	Esteghlal Khuzestan	9	0
38	Amir Mohammad Mazloum	(Iran)	CF	18	2013	(Youth system)	6	0

Out during the season (transferred, or released)

No.	Name	Nationality	Position	Age	Year signed	Signed from	Appearance(s)	Goal(s)
3	Arilson	(Brazil)	RB	30	2012	(Brazil) Grêmio Barueri	7	0
5	Saeed Hallafi	(Iran)	RW, AM	23	2012	Sanat Naft	14	3
10	Afshin Chavoshi	(Iran)	CF	29	2008 to 2019, 2010	Steel Azin	112	39
13	Mohammad Abshak	(Iran)	CM, DMF	27	2008	Pegah	85	3
77	Jahangir Asgari	(Iran)	CM	27	2011 to 2012, 2013	Rah Ahan	26	4
19	Boubacar Kébé	(France)	CF	26	2012	(Free Agent)	17	2

== Transfers ==
=== Summer ===
In: Note: Flags indicate national team as defined under FIFA eligibility rules; some limited exceptions apply. Players may hold more than one non-FIFA nationality.

No.	Pos.	Nation	Player
26	MF	IRI	Saeid Ghadami (from Persepolis)
27	FW	IRI	Rouhollah Seifollahi ^{PL} (from Persepolis)
14	MF	IRI	Mohammad Reza Kardoust ^{PL} (from Gahar Zagros)
22	GK	IRI	Habib Dehghani ^{PL} (from Sanat Naft)
77	FW	IRI	Jahangir Asgari ^{PL} (from Sorinet)
—	FW	IRI	Alireza Sabouri Azad (from Sepidrood)
23	FW	IRI	Saeid Mortazavi (Loan Return from Parseh Tehran)
35	FW	IRI	Hamid Khodabandelou (from Esteghlal Khuzestan)

Out: Note: Flags indicate national team as defined under FIFA eligibility rules; some limited exceptions apply. Players may hold more than one non-FIFA nationality.

No.	Pos.	Nation	Player
30	MF	IRI	Alireza Jahanbakhsh (to (Netherlands) N.E.C)
7	MF	IRI	Hossein Ebrahimi (to Naft Tehran)
31	MF	IRI	Alireza Vahedi Nikbakht (to Esteghlal)
17	DF	IRI	Hossein Koushki (Released)
22	GK	IRI	Hassan Roudbarian (to Mes Kerman)

=== Winter ===
In: Note: Flags indicate national team as defined under FIFA eligibility rules; some limited exceptions apply. Players may hold more than one non-FIFA nationality.

No.	Pos.	Nation	Player

Out: Note: Flags indicate national team as defined under FIFA eligibility rules; some limited exceptions apply. Players may hold more than one non-FIFA nationality.

No.	Pos.	Nation	Player
3	DF	BRA	Arilson (Released)
19	FW	FRA	Boubacar Kébé (to Esteghlal)
77	FW	IRI	Jahangir Asgari (Released)
13	MF	IRI	Mohammad Abshak (to Mes Kerman)
10	FW	IRI	Afshin Chavoshi (to Aluminium)

== Competitions ==
=== Iran Pro League ===
==== Standings ====
Pos	Team	Pld	W	D	L	GF	GA	GD	Pts	Qualification or relegation
12	Est. Khuzestan	30	6	11	13	26	37	−11	29	
13	Zob Ahan	30	6	11	13	24	36	−12	29	
14	Fajr Sepasi (R)	30	6	11	13	20	34	−14	29	Qualification to relegation play-offs
15	Damash (R)	30	5	12	13	30	40	−10	26 (Note: Esteghlal, Malavan, Damash, Persepolis and Tractor Sazi were deducted 1 point due to poor fan behavior in their home matches.)	Relegation to 2014–15 Azadegan League
16	Mes Kerman (R)	30	1	19	10	21	36	−15	22	Relegation to 2014–15 Azadegan League

Updated to match(es) played on 11 April 2014. Source: FIFA.com
Rules for classification: 1) points; 2) goal difference; 3) number of goals scored.
(R) Relegated

==== Results by round ====
Round	1	2	3	4	5	6	7	8	9	10	11	12	13	14	15	16	17	18	19	20	21	22	23	24	25	26	27	28	29	30
Ground	H	A	H	A	H	A	H	A	H	H	A	H	A	H	A	A	A	A	H	A	H	A	H	A	A	H	A	H	A	H
Result	D	D	D	L	L	W	D	D	W	W	L	D	L	W	D	W	L	D	L	L	L	L	L	D	D	D	D	L	L	D
Position	7	9	10	13	14	11	13	12	9	7	8	9	11	10	10	10	10	10	10	10	11	11	12	12	12	12	15	15	15	15

Updated to match(es) played on 11 April 2014. Source: "Ipl".
A = Away; H = Home; W = Win; D = Draw; L = Loss

==== Matches ====
Win Draw Loss Postponed

25 July 2013 1	Damash	1 – 1	Saipa	Rasht
22:00	Nazifkar 90+4'; Nazifkar (yellow card) 90+4'	Summary	Shahbazzadeh 14'; Babak Hatami (red card) 86'	Stadium: Azodi Stadium; Attendance: 4,000; Referee: Ashkan Khorshidi

1 August 2013 2	Malavan	0 – 0	Damash	Bandar-e Anzali
22:00		Summary	Rahimi (yellow card) 29'; Sohrabi (yellow card) 40'; Abshak (yellow card) 45+1'	Stadium: Takhti Stadium; Attendance: 12,000; Referee: Touraj Haghverdi

6 August 2013 3	Damash	1 – 1	Naft Tehran	Rasht
22:00	Hassanzadeh (yellow card) 62'; 70'; Sohrabi (yellow card) 75'	Summary	Kamyabinia (yellow card) 28'; Amiri 56'	Stadium: Azodi Stadium; Attendance: 5,000; Referee: Bonyadifar

10 August 2013 4	Foolad	3 – 1	Damash	Ahvaz
20:30	Chimba 26' 46'; Rahmani 53'	Summary	Abshak (yellow card) 21'; Hassanzadeh 47'; Mahdavi (yellow card) 50'; Nazifkar (yellow card) 56'	Stadium: Ghadir Stadium; Attendance: 1,000; Referee: Kermanshahi

15 August 2013 5	Damash	1 – 2	Esteghlal	Rasht
19:30	Motevaselzadeh 16'; Rahimi (yellow card) 81'; Mahdavi (yellow card) 90+2'	Summary	Siavash Akbarpour 25'; Farhad Majidi 68'	Stadium: Azodi Stadium; Attendance: 13,000; Referee: Salehi

23 August 2013 6	Gostaresh	0 – 2	Damash	Tabriz
19:30		Summary	Mohammadpouri 39' (OG); Hassanzadeh 69'; Dehgani (yellow card); Hajizadeh (yellow card)	Stadium: Yadegar-e Emam Stadium; Attendance: 300

30 August 2013 7	Damash	1 – 1	Sepahan	Rasht
19:30	Seifollahi 69'; Seifollahi (yellow card) 64'; Mohammadi (yellow card) 72'	Summary	Đalović 43'; Ahmadi (yellow card) 44'; Aghili (yellow card) 58'; Hajsafi (yellow card) 72'	Stadium: Azodi Stadium; Attendance: 8,000; Referee: Daneshmehr

5 September 2013 8	Fajr Sepasi	2 – 2	Damash	Shiraz
18:40	Rigi 40'; Ansari 44'	Summary	Seifollahi 7'; Hajati (yellow card) 44'; Seifollahi (yellow card) 56'; Nazifkar (yellow card) 69'; Chavoshi 86'	Stadium: Hafezieh Stadium; Attendance: 2,000; Referee: Vasilehbar

13 September 2013 9	Damash	2 – 1	Saba Qom	Rasht
18:40	Hajizadeh (yellow card) 13'; Nazifkar (yellow card) 44'; Mokhtari 63'; Motevaselzadeh 90+3'	Summary	Cheshmi (yellow card) 29'; Houtan (yellow card) 42'; Enayati (yellow card) 76'; Bayat 90+5'	Stadium: Azodi Stadium; Attendance: 4,000; Referee: Akbarian

20 September 2013 10	Damash	1 – 0	Tractor Sazi	Rasht
16:15	Motevaselzadeh 74'	Summary	Fakhreddini (yellow card) 85'	Stadium: Azodi Stadium; Attendance: 6,000; Referee: Haghverdi

26 September 2013 11	Rah Ahan	1 – 0	Damash	Tehran
17:45	Barzay 38'; Fallahzadeh (yellow card); Khaleghifar (yellow card)	Summary	Mokhtari (yellow card); Mohammadi (yellow card)	Stadium: Takhti; Attendance: 400; Referee: Rasoul Rahbarfam

4 October 2013 12	Damash	0 – 0	Esteghlal Khuzestan	Rasht
16:00		Summary	Mohammad Tayyebi (yellow card); Kheiri (yellow card); Traoré (yellow card)	Stadium: Azodi Stadium; Attendance: 4,000; Referee: Jamshid Mohammadi

18 October 2013 13	Persepolis	2 – 0	Damash	Tehran
19:30	Motevaselzadeh 45' (o.g.); Kafshgari (red card) 75'; Aliasgari 84'	Summary	Seifollahi (yellow card); Abshak (yellow card); Mokhtari (red card) 82'	Stadium: Azadi Stadium; Attendance: 15,000; Referee: Haj Babaei

24 October 2013 14	Damash	5 – 1	Zob Ahan	Rasht
17:00	Hassanzadeh 29', 65'; Hadi Mohammadi 41'; Hajizadeh (yellow card); Mostafa Haajati 57'; Ghadami (yellow card); Motevaselzadeh 79'	Summary	Tabrizi 25'	Stadium: Azodi Stadium; Attendance: 2,000; Referee: Saeid Mozaffarizadeh

3 November 2013 15	Mes	1 – 1	Damash	Kerman
15:30	Fyfe (yellow card); Édinho 69'; Mahmoud Tighnavard (yellow card); Shahdadnejad (red card) 90'	Summary	Ebrahimi (yellow card); Nazifkar 72' (pen.); Sohrabi (yellow card)	Stadium: Shahid Bahonar Stadium; Attendance: 1,000; Referee: Farshid Afshar

29 November 2013 16	Saipa	2 – 3	Damash	Karaj
15:00	Rezaei 30'; Rahimi 37' (OG)		Seifollahi 23'; Hajati 37'; Motevaselzadeh 86'	Stadium: Enghelab Stadium; Attendance: 100; Referee: Bonyadifar

6 December 2013 17	Damash Gilan	0 – 3	Malavan	Rasht
15:00		Summary	Rafkhaei 22'; Zare (yellow card) 22'	Stadium: Azodi Stadium; Attendance: 15,000; Referee: Mozaffarizadeh

13 December 2013 18	Naft Tehran	0 – 0	Damash Gilan

20 December 2013 19	Damash	1 – 2	Foolad	Rasht
				Stadium: Azodi Stadium

24 December 2013 20	Esteghlal	1 – 0	Damash	Tehran
	Hanif Omranzadeh (yellow card) 15'; Hanif Omranzadeh 41'; Mohammad Ghazi (yellow card) 82'; Amir Hossein Sadeghi (yellow card) 84'	Summary		Stadium: Azadi Stadium; Attendance: 1,000

4 January 2014 21	Damash	1 – 2	Gostaresh	Rasht
15:00	Mahdavi 55'; Seifollahi (yellow card) (yellow-red card) (90+4)	Summary	Bayrami 7'; Ansari 76'	Stadium: Azodi Stadium; Referee: Sharafi

11 January 2014 22	Sepahan	2 – 0	Damash	Fuladshahr
14:30	Khalilzadeh (yellow card) 15'; Ahmadi (yellow card) 40'; Hamoudi (yellow card) 51'; Sharifi 72'; Gholami 78'	Summary		Stadium: Foolad Shahr Stadium; Attendance: 500; Referee: Mohammadreza Akbarian

16 January 2014 23	Damash	1 – 3	Fajr Sepasi	Rasht
14:30	Nazifkar 1'; Mohammadi (yellow card) 55'; Seifollahi (yellow card) 73'; Kardoust (yellow card) 75'	Summary	Bekrić 23'; Ansari (yellow card) 31'; Jokar 70'; Ali Mohammadi 88'	Stadium: Azodi Stadium; Attendance: 3,000; Referee: Hossein Akrami

26 January 2014 24	Saba Qom	3 – 2	Damash Gilan	Qom
14:30		Summary		Stadium: Yadegar-e Emam Stadium

31 January 2014 25	Tractor Sazi	0 – 0	Damash	Tabriz
14:30		Summary		Stadium: Yadegar-e Emam Stadium

7 February 2014 26	Damash	1 – 1	Rah Ahan	Rasht
15:00	Seifollahi 55'	Summary	Abdi 74'	Stadium: Azodi Stadium; Referee: Zargar

16 February 2014 27	Esteghlal Khuzestan	1 – 1	Damash	Ahvaz
15:30	Coulibaly 84' (pen.)		Motevaselzadeh 70'	Stadium: Ghadir Stadium; Attendance: 500

27 March 2014 28	Damash	0 – 1	Persepolis	Rasht
17:00	Mokhtari (yellow card); Hajizadeh (yellow card); Mahdavi (yellow card); Rasoul Soroushnia (yellow card); Seifollahi (yellow card)	Summary	Abbaszadeh 30'; Pooladi (yellow card)	Stadium: Azodi Stadium; Referee: Yadollah Jahanbazi

6 April 2014 29	Zob Ahan	2 – 1	Damash	Fuladshahr
18:00	Rajabzadeh (yellow card) (goal) 3', 54'; Bayatinia (yellow card)	Summary	Hadi Mohammadi (yellow card); Mostafa Haajati (yellow card); Mahdavi (yellow card); Mohammad Siah (yellow card); Ghadami (yellow card); Motevaselzadeh 67'	Stadium: Foolad Shahr Stadium; Referee: Mohammadreza Akbarian

11 April 2014 30	Damash	1 – 1	Mes	Rasht
19:30	Hassanzadeh 82'	Summary	Seifpanahi (yellow card); Milad Jahani (yellow card); Hassanzadeh 43'	Stadium: Azodi Stadium; Referee: Gholamreza Jabbari

=== Hazfi Cup ===
Win Draw Loss Postponed

26 September 2013 11	Damash	0 – 1	Rah Ahan	Rasht
15:00	Mokhtari (yellow card) 6'; Ghadami (yellow card) 22'	Goal.com	Karimi (yellow card) 32'; Khaleghifar 80'; Karimi (yellow card) 32'; Zarei (yellow card) 58'; Zamani (yellow card) 72'	Stadium: Dr. Azodi; Attendance: 5,000; Referee: Seyed Hossein Zargar

=== Friendly Matches ===
==== Pre-season ====
Win Draw Loss Postponed

9 July 2013 1	Damash	2 – 0	Esteghlal Khuzestan	Karaj
18:30 UTC+04:30	Hajizadeh 60'; Hassanzadeh 80'

12 July 2013 2	Damash	2 – 3	Shahrdari Yasuj	Karaj
18:30 UTC+04:30	Chavoshi

21 July 2013 3	Damash	4 – 0	Rahpoyan Rezvanshahr	Rasht
18:30 UTC+04:30	Chavoshi; Almaskhane; Kébé			Stadium: Sardar Jangal Stadium; Attendance: 400

== Squad statistics ==
=== Appearances & goals ===
Last updated 20 June 2014

No.	Pos	Nat	Player	Total		Pro League		Hazi Cup	
No.	Pos	Nat	Player	Apps	Goals	Apps	Goals	Apps	Goals
1	GK	(Iran) IRI	Milad Farahani	21	0	20+0	0	1+0	0
2	DF	(Iran) IRI	Mohammad Siah	10	0	9+1	0	0+0	0
3	DF	(Brazil) BRA	Arilson	0	0	0+0	0	0+0	0
4	MF	(Iran) IRI	Abolfazl Hajizadeh	20	0	19+0	0	1+0	0
5	MF	(Iran) IRI	Saeed Halafi	2	0	1+1	0	0+0	0
6	DF	(Iran) IRI	Morteza Ebrahimi	6	0	5+1	0	0+0	0
7	FW	(Iran) IRI	Amin Motevaselzadeh	26	8	11+14	8	1+0	0
8	DF	(Iran) IRI	Alireza Nazifkar	28	4	27+0	4	1+0	0
9	MF	(Iran) IRI	Hadi Sohrabi	26	0	10+15	0	1+0	0
10	FW	(Iran) IRI	Afshin Chavoshi	12	1	5+6	1	0+1	0
11	FW	(Iran) IRI	Mohammad Reza Mahdavi	21	1	18+3	1	0+0	0
12	MF	(Iran) IRI	Mostafa Hajati	28	2	22+5	2	1+0	0
13	MF	(Iran) IRI	Mohammad Abshak	8	0	8+0	0	0+0	0
14	MF	(Iran) IRI	Reza Kardoust	23	1	19+3	1	0+1	0
16	MF	(Iran) IRI	Rasoul Soroushnia	12	0	9+3	0	0+0	0
17	FW	(Iran) IRI	Masoud Hassanzadeh	28	5	21+7	5	0+0	0
18	FW	(Iran) IRI	Reza Almaskhale	8	0	2+6	0	0+0	0
19	MF	(France) FRA	Boubacar Kébé	8	0	5+3	0	0+0	0
20	DF	(Iran) IRI	Mohammad Mokhtari	23	1	22+0	1	1+0	0
21	MF	(Iran) IRI	Abouzar Rahimi	23	0	21+1	0	1+0	0
22	GK	(Iran) IRI	Habib Dehghani	6	0	6+0	0	0+0	0
23	FW	(Iran) IRI	Saeid Mortazavi	1	0	0+1	0	0+0	0
24	DF	(Iran) IRI	Saman Farzampour	0	0	0+0	0	0+0	0
25	MF	(Iran) IRI	Mohammad Ali Rahimi	1	0	0+1	0	0+0	0
26	DF	(Iran) IRI	Saeid Ghadami	12	0	8+3	0	1+0	0
27	FW	(Iran) IRI	Rouhollah Seifollahi	26	5	21+4	5	1+0	0
28	MF	(Iran) IRI	Armin Monfared Doust	0	0	0+0	0	0+0	0
29	DF	(Iran) IRI	Hadi Mohammadi	27	1	26+0	1	1+0	0
31	MF	(Iran) IRI	Maziar Motaghi	0	0	0+0	0	0+0	0
32	GK	(Iran) IRI	Milad Pourgholi	0	0	0+0	0	0+0	0
33	GK	(Iran) IRI	Behnam Laayeghifar	4	0	4+0	0	0+0	0
35	FW	(Iran) IRI	Hamid Khodabandelou	9	0	6+2	0	0+1	0
36	MF	(Iran) IRI	Mohammad Dadrasi	3	0	0+3	0	0+0	0
38	FW	(Iran) IRI	Amir Mohammad Mazloum	6	0	2+4	0	0+0	0
77	FW	(Iran) IRI	Jahangir Asgari	2	0	1+1	0	0+0	0

=== Goal scorers ===
Includes all competitive matches. The list is sorted by shirt number when total goals are equal.

Last updated on 20 June 2014

No.	Pos.	Name	Iran Pro League	Hazfi Cup	Total
7	FW	(Iran) Amin Motevaselzadeh	8	0	7
27	FW	(Iran) Rouhollah Seifollahi	5	0	5
17	FW	(Iran) Masoud Hassanzadeh	5	0	4
8	DF	(Iran) Alireza Nazifkar	4	0	4
12	MF	(Iran) Mostafa Hajati	2	0	2
10	FW	(Iran) Afshin Chavoshi	1	0	1
20	DF	(Iran) Mohammad Mokhtari	1	0	1
11	MF	(Iran) Mohammad Reza Mahdavi	1	0	1
14	MF	(Iran) Reza Kardoust	1	0	1
29	DF	(Iran) Hadi Mohammadi	1	0	1
		Own Goal	1	0	1
TOTALS			30	0	30

Friendlies and Pre-season goals are not recognized as competitive match goals.

=== Coaching staff ===
Position	Staff
Head coach	(Iran) Ali Nazarmohammadi
Assistant coach	(Iran) Ali Koulivand
Goalkeepers coach	(Brazil) Mendez

=== Other personnel ===
President	(Iran) Amir Abedini

Updated to match played 30 August 2012

== See also ==
- 2013–14 Persian Gulf Cup
