= Alou Traoré =

Malian footballer

Personal information
- Date of birth: 8 October 1974 (age 52)
- Place of birth: Bamako, Mali
- Height: 1.77 m (5 ft 10 in)
- Position: Defender

Senior career*
Years	Team	Apps	(Gls)
1998–2001	Djoliba		
2001–2003	Pyunik	25	(0)
2003–2005	Djoliba		
2005–2007	Sorkhpooshan		
2007–2009	Saipa	30	(1)
2009–2011	Tractor Sazi	34	(0)

International career^{‡}
1996–2001	Mali	8	(0)
- * Club domestic league appearances and goals as of 2 August 2020 ‡ National team caps and goals as of 2 August 2020

Alou Traoré (born 08 october 1974) is a retired Malian international footballer who played for Djoliba, Pyunik, Sorkhpooshan, Saipa and Tractor Sazi.

== Career ==
=== Club ===
Traoré had two spells in his native Mali playing for Djoliba, a spell in Armenia with Pyunik and a in Iran with Sorkhpooshan, Saipa and Tractor Sazi.

=== International ===
Traoré played for the Mali national football team between 1994 and 2002. He was part of the 2002 FIFA World Cup qualifying squad for Mali.

== Career statistics ==
=== Club ===
Appearances and goals by club, season and competition
Club	Season	League			National Cup		League Cup		Continental		Other		Total	
Club	Season	Division	Apps	Goals	Apps	Goals	Apps	Goals	Apps	Goals	Apps	Goals	Apps	Goals
Djoliba	1998–99	Malian Première Division					-		(Note: Appearances in the CAF Champions League)		(Note: Appearance in Super Coupe National du Mali)			
Djoliba	1999–00	Malian Première Division					-		-					
Djoliba	2000–01	Malian Première Division					-				-			
Djoliba	Total						-	-	-	-	-	-		
Pyunik	2001	Armenian Premier League	3	0			-		-		-		0	0
Pyunik	2002	Armenian Premier League	18	0			-		4 (Note: Appearances in the UEFA Champions League)	0	(Note: Appearance in Armenian Supercup)		22	0
Pyunik	2003	Armenian Premier League	4	0			-		0	0			4	0
Pyunik	Total		25	0			-	-	4	0			29	0
Djoliba	2002–03	Malian Première Division					-		(Note: Appearances in the CAF Cup)		-			
Djoliba	2004	Malian Première Division					-		-		-			
Djoliba	2005	Malian Première Division					-				-			
Djoliba	Total						-	-	-	-	-	-		
Sorkhpooshan	2005–06	Azadegan League					-		-		-			
Sorkhpooshan	2006–07	Azadegan League					-		-		-			
Sorkhpooshan	Total						-	-	-	-	-	-		
Saipa	2007–08	Iran Pro League	18	0			-		3 (Note: Appearances in the AFC Champions League)	0	-		21	0
Saipa	2008–09	Iran Pro League	12	1			-		-		-		12	1
Saipa	Total		30	1			-	-	3	0	-	-	33	1
Tractor Sazi	2009–10	Iran Pro League	18	0			-		-		-		18	0
Tractor Sazi	2010–11	Iran Pro League	16	0			-		-		-		16	0
Tractor Sazi	Total		34	0			-	-	-	-	-	-	34	0
Career total			89	1			-	-	7	0			96	1

=== International ===
As of match played 18 March 2001

Appearances and goals by national team and year
National team	Year	Apps	Goals
Mali	1996	1	0
Mali	1997	0	0
Mali	1998	0	0
Mali	1999	5	0
Mali	2000	1	0
Mali	2001	1	0
Total		8	0
