= Kardoust =

Kardoust is an Arabic surname. Notable people with the surname include:

- Asghar Kardoust (born 1986), Iranian basketball player
- Reza Kardoust (born 1984), Iranian football player
