= Ali Ahmadi =

Ali Ahmadi may refer to:

- Ali Ahmadi (nomad), gladiator on the 2008 Australian TV series Gladiators
- Ali Ahmadi (Iranian footballer) (born 1994)

== See also ==
- Ali-Asghar Ahmadi (born 1956), Iranian reformist politician
