= Saeid Ghadami =

Iranian footballer

Personal information
- Full name: Saeid Ghadami Jadval Ghadam
- Date of birth: 3 April 1992 (age 34)
- Place of birth: Yasuj, Iran
- Height: 1.82 m (6 ft 0 in)
- Position: Left back

Youth career
- 2008–2011: Foolad
- 2011–2013: Persepolis

Senior career*
Years	Team	Apps	(Gls)
2009–2011	Foolad	1	(0)
2011–2013	Persepolis	0	(0)
2013–2015	Damash	22	(1)
2015	Sanat Naft	0	(0)
2016	Damash		
2016–2017	Aluminium Arak		
2019	Sepidrood Rasht S.C.		

International career^{‡}
2009–2010	Iran U-17	4	(0)
2010–2012	Iran U-20	3	(0)
2012–	Iran U-22	0	(0)
- * Club domestic league appearances and goals as of 18 March 2015 ‡ National team caps and goals as of 11 December 2011

Saeid Ghadami (born April 3, 1992) is an Iranian football midfielder who currently plays for Damash and is a member of the Iran national under-23 football team.

== Club career ==
=== Foolad ===
Ghadami is part of the Foolad squad in 9th Iranian Premier League. He made his debut for Foolad against Esteghlal Ahvaz on 4 April 2010 when he used as substitute.

=== Persepolis ===
He played two seasons for Foolad and moved to Persepolis in the winter of 2011. He was used as a left winger and left back. He signed a 2.5-year contract until the end of the 2013–14 season.

=== Club career statistics ===
As of 18 March 2015

Club	Division	Season	League		Hazfi Cup		Asia		Total	
Club	Division	Season	Apps	Goals	Apps	Goals	Apps	Goals	Apps	Goals
Foolad	Pro League	2009–10	1	0	0	0	–	–	1	0
Foolad	Pro League	2010–11	0	0	0	0	–	–	0	0
Persepolis	Pro League	2011–12	0	0	0	0	0	0	0	0
Persepolis	Pro League	2012–13	0	0	0	0	–	–	0	0
Damash	Pro League	2013–14	11	0	1	0	–	–	12	0
Damash	Azadegan League	2014–15	11	1	–	–	–	–	11	1
Career Total			23	1	1	0	0	0	24	1

== International ==
=== U–17 ===
Ghadami represented Iran U–17 in the 2009 FIFA U-17 World Cup. He made an appearance during the 2009 FIFA U-17 World Cup against Netherlands U-17 while he used as a substitute.

=== U–20 ===
Ghadami was invited to the Iran U–20 preliminary squad to compete 2010 AFC U-19 Championship, but was removed from the final squad by the coach, Ali Doustimehr.

== Honours ==
Persepolis

- Hazfi Cup: 2012–13 (Runner-up)
