= Hadi Mohammadi =

Iranian footballer

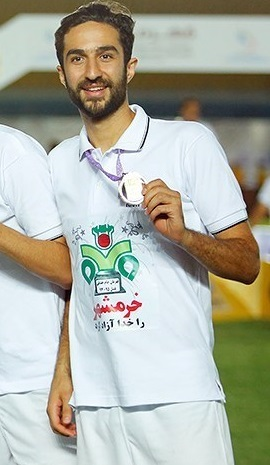
- Mohammadi with Zob Ahan in 2016

Personal information
- Full name: Hadi Mohammadi
- Date of birth: 8 March 1991 (age 35)
- Place of birth: Mahallat, Iran
- Height: 1.88 m (6 ft 2 in)
- Position: Centre back

Team information
- Current team: Sepahan
- Number: 2

Youth career
- 2006–2008: Saba Qom
- 2008: Persepolis
- 2009–2011: Sanat Naft
- 2011–2012: Damash Gilan

Senior career*
Years	Team	Apps	(Gls)
2010–2011	Sanat Naft	0	(0)
2011–2014	Damash Gilan	29	(1)
2014–2020	Zob Ahan	93	(6)
2016–2018	→ Tractor (loan)	27	(1)
2020–2023	Tractor	63	(3)
2023–	Sepahan	46	(0)

International career
- Iran U20
2012–2014	Iran U22	2	(0)
- * Club domestic league appearances and goals as of 3 April 2022

Hadi Mohammadi (born 8 March 1991) is an Iranian footballer who plays as a centre back for Persian Gulf Pro League club Sepahan.

== Club career ==
=== Early years ===
He started his career with Aria Tehran youth levels. Later he joined Saba Qom and Sanat Naft youth academies.

=== Damash ===
He joined Damash in summer 2011. He made his debut for Damash on 15 September 2012.

=== Zob Ahan ===
After relegation of Damash to Azadegan League, Mohammadi joined Zob Ahan for a fee around 3.5 Billion Rials. He signed a two-year contract with the club and made his debut for it in the first week against Saba Qom.

== Club career statistics ==
As of 1 January 2025

Club	Division	Season	League		Hazfi Cup		Asia		Other		Total	
Club	Division	Season	Apps	Goals	Apps	Goals	Apps	Goals	Apps	Goals	Apps	Goals
Sanat Naft	Pro League	2010–11	0	0	0	0	–	–	0	0	0	0
Damash	Pro League	2011–12	0	0	1	0	–	–	0	0	1	0
Damash	Pro League	2012–13	5	0	0	0	–	–	0	0	5	0
Damash	Pro League	2013–14	25	1	0	0	–	–	0	0	25	1
Damash	Total		30	1	1	0	0	0	0	0	31	1
Zob Ahan	Persian Gulf Pro League	2014–15	27	3	5	0	–	–	0	0	32	3
Zob Ahan	Persian Gulf Pro League	2015–16	24	1	5	0	6	0	0	0	35	1
Zob Ahan	Total		51	4	10	0	6	0	0	0	67	4
Tractor (loan)	Persian Gulf Pro League	2016–17	27	1	3	0	–	–	0	0	30	1
Tractor (loan)	Persian Gulf Pro League	2017–18	0	0	0	0	–	–	0	0	0	0
Tractor (loan)	Total		27	1	3	0	0	0	0	0	30	1
Zob Ahan	Persian Gulf Pro League	2018–19	20	1	1	0	5	0	0	0	24	1
Zob Ahan	Persian Gulf Pro League	2019–20	22	1	0	0	0	0	0	0	22	0
Zob Ahan	Total		44	2	1	0	5	0	0	0	50	2
Tractor	Persian Gulf Pro League	2020–21	18	0	1	0	7	0	1	0	27	0
Tractor	Persian Gulf Pro League	2021-22	20	1	0	0	0	0	0	0	20	1
Tractor	Persian Gulf Pro League	2022-23	25	2	1	0	0	0	0	0	26	2
Tractor	Total		63	3	2	0	7	0	1	0	73	3
Sepahan	Persian Gulf Pro League	2023-24	20	0	3	2	2	0	0	0	25	2
Sepahan	Persian Gulf Pro League	2024–25	8	0	1	0	2	0	0	0	11	0
Career Total			243	11	21	2	22	0	1	0	287	13

== International ==
=== U–22 ===
He was invited to Iran U–22 squad to compete 2013 AFC U-22 Championship by Alireza Mansourian.

== Honours ==
Zob Ahan

- Hazfi Cup: 2014–15, 2015–16

Sepahan

- Hazfi Cup: 2023–24
- Iranian Super Cup: 2024
