= 2006–07 Azadegan League =

16th season of Azadegan League

Azadegan League
- Season: 2006–07
- Champions: Shirin Faraz
- Promoted: Pegah Gilan; Shirin Faraz
- Top goalscorer: Farhad Kheirkhah

The 2006–07 Azadegan League was the 16th season of the League and sixth as the second highest division since its establishment in 1991.

Following are the standings for the 2006–07 season in the Azadegan League.

== Group A ==
Pos	Team	Pld	W	D	L	GF	GA	GD	Pts	Qualification or relegation
1	Pegah Gilan (Damash Gilan)	22	12	6	4	23	6	+17	42	Advanced to second round
2	Shirin Faraz	22	11	7	4	30	11	+19	40	Advanced to second round
3	Etka	22	11	5	6	34	27	+7	38	
4	Moghavemate Mersad	22	9	6	7	23	16	+7	33	
5	Homa	22	7	9	6	18	17	+1	30	
6	Esteghlal Dezful	22	6	9	7	19	21	−2	27	
7	Mashin Sazi	22	5	11	6	12	15	−3	26	
8	Shardari Tabriz	22	6	7	9	14	21	−7	25	
9	Ekbatan	22	6	7	9	13	24	−11	25	
10	Shahin Bushehr	22	4	12	6	18	22	−4	24	
11	Shemushack	22	5	8	9	15	20	−5	23	
12	Kesht-o-Sanat	22	3	7	12	10	30	−20	16	Relegated to 2007-08 Iran Football's 2nd Division

== Group B ==
Pos	Team	Pld	W	D	L	GF	GA	GD	Pts	Promotion or relegation
1	Tractor Sazi	20	11	5	4	21	16	+5	38	Advanced to second round
2	Sh. Bandar Abbas	20	9	7	4	27	14	+13	34	Advanced to second round
3	Sorkhpooshan	20	9	6	5	33	17	+16	33	
4	Tarbiat Yazd	20	8	8	4	29	21	+8	32	
5	Tose'eh Rouy	20	7	6	7	20	17	+3	27	
6	Nassaji Mazandaran	20	7	6	7	26	26	0	27	
7	Niroye Zamini Tehran	20	6	6	8	20	24	−4	24	
8	Sanaye Arak	20	6	5	9	26	28	−2	23	
9	Payam Khorasan	20	5	8	7	19	24	−5	23	
10	Kowsar	20	6	4	10	23	25	−2	22	
11	Deihim Ahvaz	20	3	5	12	15	41	−26	14	Relegated to 2007–08 Iran Football's 2nd Division
12	Sanat Naft Abadan	0	0	0	0	0	0	0	0	Promoted to 2007–08 Iran Pro League (Note: Sanat Naft was automatically promoted to the Persian Gulf for the next season by order of the IRIFF because of the 2004–05 Azadegan League promotion playoffs controversy.)

== Top goal scorers ==
11

- (Iran) Farhad Kheirkhah (Sorkhpooshan)

=== Group A ===
10

- (Iran) Matin Bigdeli (Shirin Faraz)

8

- (Iran) Amin Mohtashami (Pegah Gilan)

6

- (Iran) Ruhollah Rezaei (Moghavemat Basij)
- (Iran) Saeed Pirtandib (Esteghlal Dezful)
- (Iran) Ali Hadad (Shamoushak)

5

- (Iran) Ali Mombini (Moghavemat Basij)
- (Iran) Ghasem Salmani (Etka)

=== Group B ===
11

- (Iran) Farhad Kheirkhah (Sorkhpooshan)

9

- (Iran) Hamidreza Khedmatkari (Shahrdari Bandar Abbas)

8

- (Iran) Abbas Asadi (Tose'eh Rouy)

7

- (Iran) Behrouz Pakniat (Sanaye Arak)
- (Iran) Mohammad Sahimi (Payam Mashhad)
- (Iran) Asghar Nadali (Nassaji)
- (Iran) Bahador Abdi (Sorkhpooshan)

== Promotion playoffs ==
=== First legs ===
(May 3, Yadegare Imam Stadium, Tabriz; att: 65,000)

Tractor Sazi 1–2 Shirin Faraz

(May 3, Bandar Abbas)

Shahrdari Banadar Abbas 0–0 Pegah Gilan

=== Second legs ===
(May 12, Enghelab Stadium, Kermanshah)

Shirin Faraz 2–1 Tractor Sazi

(May 12, Azodi Stadium, Rasht; att: 25000)

Pegah Gilan 2–0 Shahrdari Banadar Abbas

Pegah Gilan and Shirin Faraz advance to the Persian Gulf Cup

== 2nd stage promotion playoffs ==
=== First legs June 10 ===
Foolad 1–0 Tractor Sazi
Rah Ahan 2–0 Shahrdari Bandar Abbas

=== Second legs June 16 ===
Tractor Sazi 0–1 Foolad
Shahrdari Banadar Abbas 0–3 Rah Ahan

Foolad and Rah Ahan play each other for final Persian Gulf Cup spot

=== Final leg ===
(June 22, Naghshe Jahan Stadium, Esfahan)

Rah Ahan 1–0 Foolad

Rah Ahan FC remains in the Persian Gulf Cup while Foolad FC is relegated to the Azadegan League.

- Azadegan League champions : Shirin Faraz Gharb
- Relegated to 2nd division : Deihim Ahvaz, Kesht-o-Sanat Shushtar
- Promoted to the IPL : Pegah Gilan, Sanat Naft, Shirin Faraz Gharb
- Promoted from 2nd division : Damash Iranian F.C., Sepahan Novin F.C.
