= Rouhollah Seifollahi =

Iranian footballer

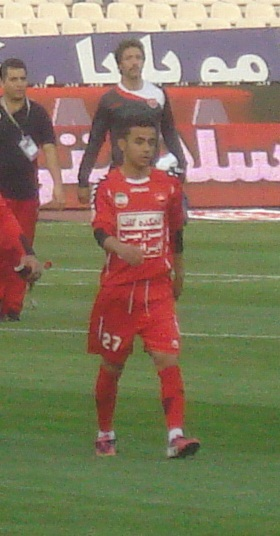
- Rouhollah Seifollahi

Personal information
- Full name: Rouhollah Seifollahi Moghaddam
- Date of birth: 12 January 1991 (age 35)
- Place of birth: Tehran, Iran
- Height: 1.70 m (5 ft 7 in)
- Position: Attacking midfielder

Youth career
- 2004–2007: PAS
- 2007–2008: Ehsan Rey
- 2008–2010: Moghavemat Tehran
- 2010–2011: Persepolis

Senior career*
Years	Team	Apps	(Gls)
2010–2011	Persepolis B		
2011–2013	Persepolis	5	(0)
2013–2014	Damash Gilan	25	(5)
2014–2016	Esteghlal Khuzestan	47	(5)
2016–2018	Siah Jamegan	43	(2)
2018–2019	Pars Jonoubi Jam	36	(7)
2019	Foolad	12	(0)
2020–2021	Shahr Khodro	20	(2)
2021	Saipa	13	(0)
2021–2022	Naft M.I.S.	1	(0)
2022–2023	Chadormalou	1	(0)
2023	Zob Ahan	3	(0)

International career
2012	Iran U23	1	(0)
- * Club domestic league appearances and goals

Rouhollah Seifollahi (Persian: روح‌الله سیف‌اللهی; born 12 January 1991) is an Iranian former football attacking midfielder.

== Club career ==
=== Persepolis ===
He was promoted from Persepolis Academy to the first team by Ali Daei in 2011, and also was a member of Persepolis B and Persepolis U21. He only made six appearances for the club before leaving.

=== Damash ===
In summer 2013, he moved to Damash. In his only season with Damash, Seifollahi became one of the club's most important players, earned twenty-five league appearances and also scored five times.

=== Esteghlal Khuzestan ===
After Damash's relegation to the Azadegan League in 2014, Seifollahi signed a four-year contract with Esteghlal Khuzestan for fee around R3 Billion (about $100,000). He scored his first goal for the club in his debut on 1 August 2014 in a match against Gostaresh.

==== Club career statistics ====
As of 4 December 2014.

Club	Division	Season	League		Hazfi Cup		Asia		Total	
Club	Division	Season	Apps	Goals	Apps	Goals	Apps	Goals	Apps	Goals
Persepolis	Pro League	2010–11	2	0	0	0	0	0	2	0
Persepolis	Pro League	2011–12	1	0	1	0	0	0	2	0
Persepolis	Pro League	2012–13	2	0	0	0	–	–	2	0
Damash	Pro League	2013–14	25	5	1	0	–	–	26	5
Esteghlal Khuzestan	Pro League	2014–15	11	4	2	1	–	–	13	5
Esteghlal Khuzestan	Pro League	2015-16	25	1	2	0	–	–	27	1
Siah Jamegan	Pro League	2016–17	22	0	0	0	–	–	22	0
Siah Jamegan	Pro League	2017–18	21	3	0	0	–	–	21	3
Pars Jonoubi Jam	Pro League	2018–19	23	4	4	2	–	–	27	6
Career Total			130	17	10	3	0	0	140	20

== Honours ==
Esteghlal Khuzestan

- Iran Pro League (1): 2015–16

Persepolis

- Hazfi Cup (1): 2010-11
