= Habib Dehghani =

Iranian footballer

Personal information
- Full name: Habib Dehghani
- Date of birth: 18 July 1983 (age 43)
- Place of birth: Iran
- Position: Goalkeeper

Team information
- Current team: Damash Gilan
- Number: 22

Youth career
- 2000–2005: Saba Battery

Senior career*
Years	Team	Apps	(Gls)
2005–2007	Saba Battery	0	(0)
2007–2011	Saipa	4	(0)
2011–2013	Sanat Naft	39	(0)
2013–	Damash Gilan	6	(0)
- * Club domestic league appearances and goals as of 10 May 2013

Habib Dehghani (Persian: حبیب دهقانی; born 18 July 1983) is an Iranian footballer. He currently plays for Damash Gilan in the IPL.

== Club career ==
Dehghani joined Saipa in 2007, after spending the previous season at Saba Battery. After Sanat Naft relegation to lower division he joined Pro League side Damash.

Club performance			League		Cup		Continental		Total	
Season	Club	League	Apps	Goals	Apps	Goals	Apps	Goals	Apps	Goals
Iran			League		Hazfi Cup		Asia		Total	
2005–06	Saba Battery	Pro League	0	0		0	0	0		0
2006–07	Saba Battery	Pro League	0	0		0	–	–		0
2007–08	Saipa	Pro League	0	0		0	0	0		0
2008–09	Saipa	Pro League	1	0	0	0	–	–	1	0
2009–10	Saipa	Pro League	2	0		0	–	–	2	0
2010–11	Saipa	Pro League	1	0	1	0	–	–	2	0
2011–12	Sanat Naft	Pro League	27	0	2	0	–	–	29	0
2012–13	Sanat Naft	Pro League	19	0	1	0	–	–	20	0
2013–14	Damash Gilan	Pro League	6	0	0	0	–	–	6	0
Career total			56	0	4	0	0	0	60	0
