= Nima Ghavidel =

Iranian footballer

Personal information
- Full name: Nima Ghavidel
- Date of birth: May 12, 1984 (age 42)
- Place of birth: Rasht, Iran
- Position: Midfielder

Team information
- Current team: Nirouye Zamini
- Number: 10

Youth career
- Sepidrood
- Esteghlal Rasht

Senior career*
Years	Team	Apps	(Gls)
- Saipa
2004–2006	Nirouye Zamini		
2006–2007	Persepolis	1	(0)
2007–2008	Nassaji		
2008–2009	Nirouye Zamini	23	(12)
2009–	Naft Tehran	7	(0)
- * Club domestic league appearances and goals as of June 3, 2009

Nima Ghavidel (also spelled Nima Qavidel, Persian: نیما قویدل, born May 12, 1984, in Iran) is an Iranian footballer.

== Club career ==
He moved to Persepolis F.C. in 2006 from his previous club Niroye Zamini F.C.
