= Farhad Kheirkhah =

Iranian footballer (born 1984)

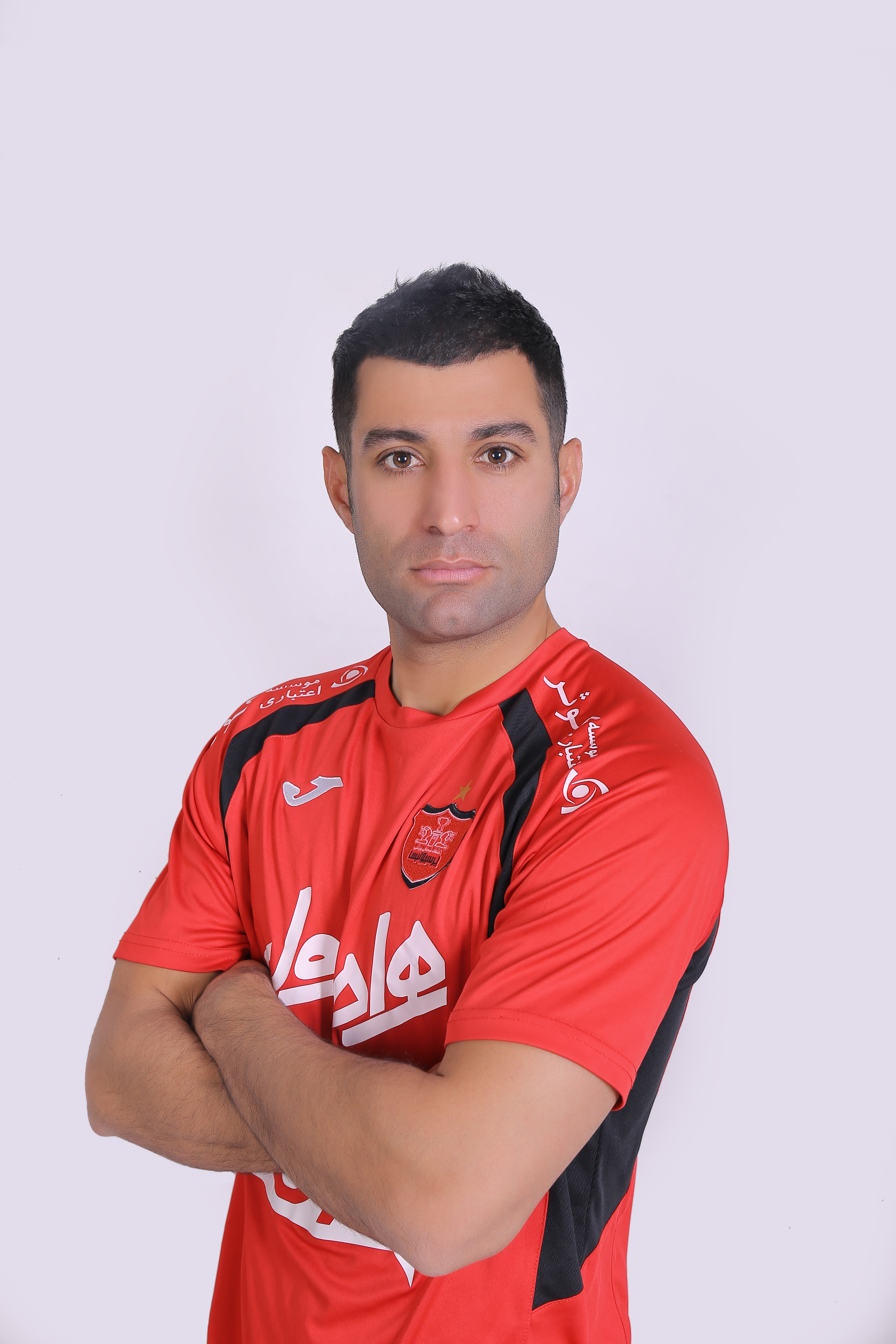

Personal information
- Date of birth: 25 March 1984 (age 42)
- Place of birth: Saveh, Iran
- Position: Striker

Youth career
- Helal Ahmar Saveh
- 2003–2005: Pas

Senior career*
Years	Team	Apps	(Gls)
2005–2007	Sorkhpooshan	25	(18)
2007–2009	Persepolis	26	(1)
2009–2010	Tractor	31	(10)
2010–2011	PAS Hamedan	30	(8)
2011–2012	Shahrdari Tabriz		
2012–2013	Nassaji	12	(1)
2013–2015	Siah Jamegan Khorasan	12	(2)
2015–2016	Shahrdari Bandar Abba		(25)
2016–2019	Khooshe Talaee	20	(5)
2019–2020	Shohadaye Razakan	1	(0)
2020–2021	Khooshe Talaee	0	(0)

Managerial career
- 2020: Khooshe Talaee (assistant)
- 2022: Khooshe Talaee (assistant)
- * Club domestic league appearances and goals

Farhad Kheirkhah (Persian: فرهاد خیرخواه; born 25 March 1984) is an Iranian football coach and a former striker.

== Club career ==
He joined Sorkhpooshan in 2005 and in only 8 games in the Azadegan League scored 12 goals, becoming the top scorer. With the offers coming thick and fast from Iran's Premier Football League teams including the likes of Esteghlal and Sepahan, he signed a 2-year contract with Persepolis FC.

=== Club career statistics ===
As of 19 October 2010

Club performance			League		Cup		Continental		Total	
Season	Club	League	Apps	Goals	Apps	Goals	Apps	Goals	Apps	Goals
Iran			League		Hazfi Cup		Asia		Total	
2005–06	Sorkhpooshan	Division 1	17	6			-	-		
2006–07	Sorkhpooshan	Division 1	8	12			-	-		
2007–08	Persepolis	Pro League	17	1	1	0	-	-	18	0
2008–09	Persepolis	Pro League	9	0	1	0	2	0	12	0
2009–10	Tractor	Pro League	31	10			-	-		
2010–11	Pas	Pro League	7	3	1	0	-	-	8	3
Total	Iran		72	26			2	0		
Career total			72	26			2	0		

- Assist goals

Season	Team	Assists
07–08	Persepolis	3
10–11	Pas	0

== Honours ==
- Iran's Premier Football League Winner: 1
  - 2007/08 with Persepolis

== Other websites ==
Farhad Kheirkhah on Instagram
