= Iman Heydari =

Iranian footballer

Personal information
- Full name: Iman Heydari
- Date of birth: 21 January 1983 (age 43)
- Place of birth: Iran
- Position: Forward

Team information
- Current team: Giti Pasand

Senior career*
Years	Team	Apps	(Gls)
2003–2005	Zob Ahan F.C.	31	(10)
2005–2009	Paykan	47	(19)
2009–2010	Rah Ahan	21	(6)
2010–2012	Shahin	29	(8)
2012	Paykan	9	(3)
2013–	Giti Pasand	9	(0)
- * Club domestic league appearances and goals as of 7 September 2010 (UTC) ‡ National team caps and goals as of 6 May 2010

Iman Heydari (Persian: ایمان حیدری; born January 21, 1983) is an Iranian footballer who played for Paykan in the Azadegan League.

== Club career ==
Heydari joined Rah Ahan F.C. in 2009

=== Club career statistics ===
As of 20 November 2010

Club performance			League		Cup		Continental		Total	
Season	Club	League	Apps	Goals	Apps	Goals	Apps	Goals	Apps	Goals
Iran			League		Hazfi Cup		Asia		Total	
2004–05	Zob Ahan	Persian Gulf Cup	19	7			-	-	19	7
2005–06	Paykan	Azadegan League					-	-		
2006–07	Paykan	Persian Gulf Cup	26	6	3	0	-	-	29	6
2007–08	Paykan	Persian Gulf Cup	25	2			-	-	25	2
2008–09	Paykan	Persian Gulf Cup	30	11			-	-	30	11
2009–10	Rah Ahan	Persian Gulf Cup	20	5	1	0	-	-	21	6
2010–11	Shahin	Persian Gulf Cup	15	5	1	0	-	-	16	5
Total	Iran						0	0		
Career total							0	0		

- Assist Goals

Season	Team	Assists
10–11	Shahin	0

== Honours ==
=== Club ===
- Hazfi Cup
  - Runner up:1
    - 2011–12 with Shahin Bushehr
