= Amin Motevaselzadeh =

Iranian footballer

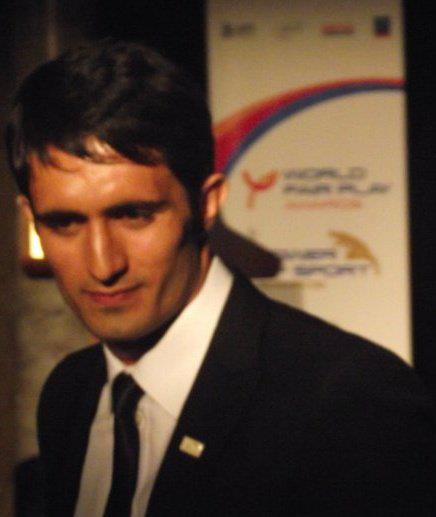

Personal information
- Date of birth: 14 May 1982 (age 44)
- Place of birth: Shiraz, Iran
- Height: 1.87 m (6 ft 1 1/2 in)
- Position: Striker

Youth career
- 1998–2000: Derak Shiraz

Senior career*
| Years | Team | Apps | (Gls) |
| 2000–2006 | Bargh Shiraz | 68 | (27) |
| 2006–2007 | Admira Wacker | 18 | (7) |
| 2007–2008 | Pegah Gilan | 26 | (3) |
| 2008–2010 | Moghavemat Shiraz | 64 | (15) |
| 2010–2011 | Rah Ahan Tehran | 20 | (5) |
| 2011–2012 | Foolad Khouzestan | 9 | (3) |
| 2012 | → PAS Hamedan (loan) | 13 | (3) |
| 2012–2014 | Damash Gilan | 57 | (13) |
| 2014–2015 | Mes Rafsanjan | 22 | (6) |
| 2015–2016 | Sanat Naft | 31 | (8) |
| 2016 | Bargh Jadid | | |
| 2016–2017 | Damash Gilan | 9 | (5) |
- * Club domestic league appearances and goals

Amin Motevaselzadeh (also spelled Motevasel Zadeh) (Persian: امین متوسل‌زاده; born 14 May 1982) is an Iranian former football striker.

== Club career ==
He joined Bargh Shiraz at age of 18 and played seven years before moving to Admira Wacker.

Motevaselzadeh signed for Admira Wacker on 1 August 2006, on a one-year deal that ran until 30 May 2007. Then he joined Pegah Gilan in Iran's Premier Football League. Motevaselzadeh scored in the last minute against his former club Bargh in the semifinals of The Hazfi Cup to take Pegah to the final for first time in which they finished second.

== Fair Player of the Year ==
He is very well known for his amazing fair play against Steel Azin on 28 January 2010. The match was between Moghamvemat and Steel Azin in round 25 of Iran Pro League. Moghamvemat was coming to the game desperately needing three points as they had gathered just two points from their last six matches. Steel Azin keeper Hamid Neshatjoo put his body on the line when he rushed out of his area and took a blow to the head to deny the host a goal scoring opportunity. The ball then fell into the path of Motevaselzadeh but rather than strike the ball into the unguarded net, the number 27 compassionately and deliberately kicked the ball into touch. Moghamvemat lost the game 2–1 and eventually was relegated on goal difference at end of the season. He was awarded the fair play player of the year 2010 in Iran Pro League. One year later, on 28 January 2011, Motevasselzadeh won The Act of Fair Play Award, along with Darius Draudvila, a Lithuanian decathlete, and Chinese wrestler Gao Feng.

=== Club career statistics ===
| Club performance | | | League | | Cup | | Continental | | Total | |
| Season | Club | League | Apps | Goals | Apps | Goals | Apps | Goals | Apps | Goals |
| Iran | | | League | | Hazfi Cup | | Asia | | Total | |
|---|---|---|---|---|---|---|---|---|---|---|
| 2003–04 | Bargh Shiraz | Pro League | 3 | 0 | | | – | | | |
| 2004–05 | Bargh Shiraz | Pro League | 14 | 1 | | | – | | | |
| 2005–06 | Bargh Shiraz | Pro League | 10 | 0 | | | – | | | |
| Austria | | | League | | Austrian Cup | | Europe | | Total | |
| 2006–07 | Admira | First League | 18 | 7 | 2 | 1 | – | | 19 | 8 |
| Iran | | | League | | Hazfi Cup | | Asia | | Total | |
| 2007–08 | Pegah Gilan | Pro League | 26 | 3 | 4 | 2 | – | | 30 | 5 |
| 2008–09 | Moghamvemat | Pro League | 32 | 10 | 1 | 0 | – | | 33 | 10 |
| 2009–10 | Moghamvemat | Pro League | 32 | 5 | 1 | 0 | – | | 33 | 5 |
| 2010–11 | Rah Ahan | Pro League | 20 | 5 | 1 | 0 | – | | 21 | 5 |
| 2011–12 | Foolad | Pro League | 9 | 2 | 1 | 1 | – | | 9 | 3 |
| 2011–12 | PAS | 1st Division | 13 | 3 | – | | – | | 13 | 3 |
| 2012–13 | Damash | Pro League | 30 | 5 | 3 | 1 | – | | 33 | 6 |
| 2013–14 | Damash | Pro League | 27 | 8 | 1 | 0 | – | | 28 | 8 |
| Total | Iran | | 192 | 36 | | | 0 | 0 | | |
| Total | Austria | | 18 | 7 | 2 | 1 | 0 | 0 | 20 | 8 |
| Career total | | | 222 | 44 | | | 0 | 0 | | |

| Season | Team | Assists |
|---|---|---|
| 09–10 | Moghavemat | 3 |
| 10–11 | Rah Ahan | 0 |
| 11–12 | Foolad | 0 |
| 12–13 | Damash | 2 |
| 13–14 | Damash | 0 |
