= Dariush Rezaeian =

Iranian footballer

Personal information
- Full name: Dariush Rezaeian
- Date of birth: April 22, 1981 (age 45)
- Place of birth: Mahshahr, Iran
- Height: 1.90 m (6 ft 3 in)
- Position: Center forward

Team information
- Current team: Payam Mashhad

Youth career
- Petrochimi Mahshahr

Senior career*
Years	Team	Apps	(Gls)
2003–2006	Sanat Naft Abadan F.C.		
2006–2007	Persepolis	4	(0)
2007–2010	Nasaji Mazandaran		
2010–	Payam Mashhad	3	(0)
- * Club domestic league appearances and goals as of 10 July 2007

Dariush Rezaeian (Persian: داریوش رضاییان, born April 22, 1981) is an Iranian football player who currently plays for Payam Mashhad in Azadegan League. He usually plays in the striker position.

== Club career ==
Rezaeian started at Abadani side Sanat Naft Abadan F.C., where he was spotted to be a sensational player in offense. It was expected that he would move to a bigger, and more successful, club sooner or later. In late August 2006 Persepolis F.C., Iran's most successful club of all time, signed Rezaeian on a 2-year contract.

=== Club career statistics ===
Club performance			League		Cup		Continental		Total	
Season	Club	League	Apps	Goals	Apps	Goals	Apps	Goals	Apps	Goals
Iran			League		Hazfi Cup		Asia		Total	
2006–07	Persepolis	Iran Pro League	4	0	1	0	-	-	5	0
