= Edison Joseph =

Nigerian footballer

Personal information
- Full name: Edison Joseph
- Date of birth: November 27, 1989 (age 36)
- Place of birth: Lagos, Nigeria
- Positions: Winger; striker

Team information
- Current team: Shahrdari Bandar Abbas F.C.
- Number: 4

Senior career*
| Years | Team | Apps | (Gls) |
| 2007–2008 | Esteghlal Jonub | 23 | (9) |
| 2008–2009 | PAS Hamedan | 29 | (13) |
| 2009 | Shaanxi Neo-China Chanba F.C. | 11 | (1) |
| 2010–2011 | Damash Lorestan | 10 | (3) |
| 2011–2012 | Shahrdari Bandar Abbas | 18 | (9) |
| 2012–2014 | Finnih F.C Lagos | 53 | (21) |
| 2015–2016 | Southern Samity | | |
- * Club domestic league appearances and goals as of May 2011

Edison Joseph (Persian: اديشون جوزف; born November 27, 1989) is an Iranian professional football player of Nigerian origin, who plays as a striker and last played for Southern Samity in the I-League 2nd Division.

== History ==
Joseph was born in the port city of Lagos, Nigeria.

In 2009, he played for Shaanxi Neo-China Chanba F.C. in the Chinese Super League.
