= Paulão (footballer, born 1985) =

Brazilian footballer

Personal information
- Full name: Paulo Roberto do Carmo
- Date of birth: 12 March 1985 (age 41)
- Place of birth: São Paulo, Brazil
- Height: 1.88 m (6 ft 2 in)
- Position: Striker

Team information
- Current team: Pelotas

Youth career
- CR Vasco da Gama

Senior career*
Years	Team	Apps	(Gls)
2006–2011	CENE		(5)
2007	→ Rio Preto (loan)		(1)
2008	→ Persepolis (loan)	7	(1)
2008	→ Kowsar (loan)	0	(0)
2009–2010	→ Atlético Sorocaba (loan)	2	(1)
2011	Boa Esporte	10	(2)
2011	→ Nanchang Hengyuan (loan)	7	(1)
2012–2014	Uberlândia		
2014	URT		
2014	Anápolis		
2014–2015	São Caetano		
2015–	Pelotas		
- * Club domestic league appearances and goals as of 3 May 2016

Paulo Roberto do Carmo (born 12 March 1985), known as Paulão in Brazil, or di Carmo (Persian: دی کارمو) in Iran, is a Brazilian football striker who currently plays for Uberlândia Esporte Clube.

== Club career ==
=== CENE and Rio Preto ===
Paulão started his professional football career with lower league side Centro Esportivo Nova Esperança in 2006. In total, he scored 5 league goals and 11 amateur cup goals for them during his time at the club. In 2007, he was loaned out to São Paulo club Rio Preto Esporte Clube and played in the Campeonato Paulista Série A2 league, where he won promotion with the club; nevertheless he returned to CENE.

=== Brawl in Iran ===
In September 2008 he was loaned out to reigning Iranian league title winners Persepolis. His appearance in Persepolis was protested hardly by fans and media in Iran who questioned the pedigree of the signing. He was believed as an inapt & amateur player after being unable to convert numerous chances and was only able to score a single goal against Foulad in a 3–2 defeat.

Cosa, Brazilian assistant coach of Persepolis who introduced him to the club claimed that he has scored 17 goals in 21 matches in Brazilian league, although this claim made controversies and not proven yet. on November 4 and November 11, his career information on Wikipedia and Brazilian Football Confederation Website was shown by Adel Ferdosipour at Navad. after pressure of criticism by fans and media, Paolao claimed that he has played for CR Vasco da Gama. On November 9, he and Cosa would both be fired from the club.

=== Ituiutaba ===
Paulão would go on to be loaned out to second tier Iranian club Kowsar F.C. and then regional Brazilian side Atlético Sorocaba before second tier Brazilian side Ituiutaba decided to permanently buy Paulão in 2011. In his debut season at Ituiutaba he would go on to make 9 appearances and score 2 goals before the club allowed Paulão to join Chinese Super League side Nanchang Hengyuan during the league season.
