= Ziaeddin Niknafs =

Iranian footballer

Personal information
- Full name: Ziaeddin Niknafs
- Date of birth: 19 September 1986 (age 40)
- Place of birth: Sanandaj, Iran
- Height: 1.80 m (5 ft 11 in)
- Position: Right back

Youth career
- 2005–2007: Persepolis

Senior career*
Years	Team	Apps	(Gls)
2007–2010	Persepolis	0	(0)
2009–2010	→ Sanat Naft (loan)	10	(0)
2010–2011	Sanat Naft	19	(0)
- * Club domestic league appearances and goals as of 5 September 2007 ‡ National team caps and goals as of 16 August 2007

Ziaeddin Niknafs (Persian: ضیاءالدین نیک نفس; born 19 September 1986) is an Iranian football defender who currently plays for Sanat Naft in Iran Pro League. He is a young left-footed defender who can play as both a left back and central defender.

== Club career ==
He was part of the squad that won the league for Persepolis in the 2007–08 season but did not play any match. He finally played a match for Persepolis in his second season in Hazfi Cup.

=== Club career statistics ===
As of 5 September 2010

Club performance			League		Cup		Continental		Total	
Season	Club	League	Apps	Goals	Apps	Goals	Apps	Goals	Apps	Goals
Iran			League		Hazfi Cup		Asia		Total	
2007–08	Persepolis	Persian Gulf Cup	0	0	0	0	-	-	0	0
2008–09	Persepolis	Persian Gulf Cup	0	0	1	0	0	0	1	0
2009–10	Persepolis	Persian Gulf Cup	0	0	0	0	-	-	0	0
2009–10	Sanat Naft	Azadegan League	10	0	0	0	-	-	10	0
2010–11	Sanat Naft	Persian Gulf Cup	19	0	0	0	-	-	19	0
		Total	14	0	1	0	0	0	15	0
Career total			14	0	1	0	0	0	15	0

- Assist Goals

Season	Team	Assists
10-11	Sanat Naft	0

== Honours ==
- Iran's Premier Football League Winner: 1
  - 2007/08 with Persepolis
