= Ivan Petrović (footballer, born 1980) =

Serbian footballer

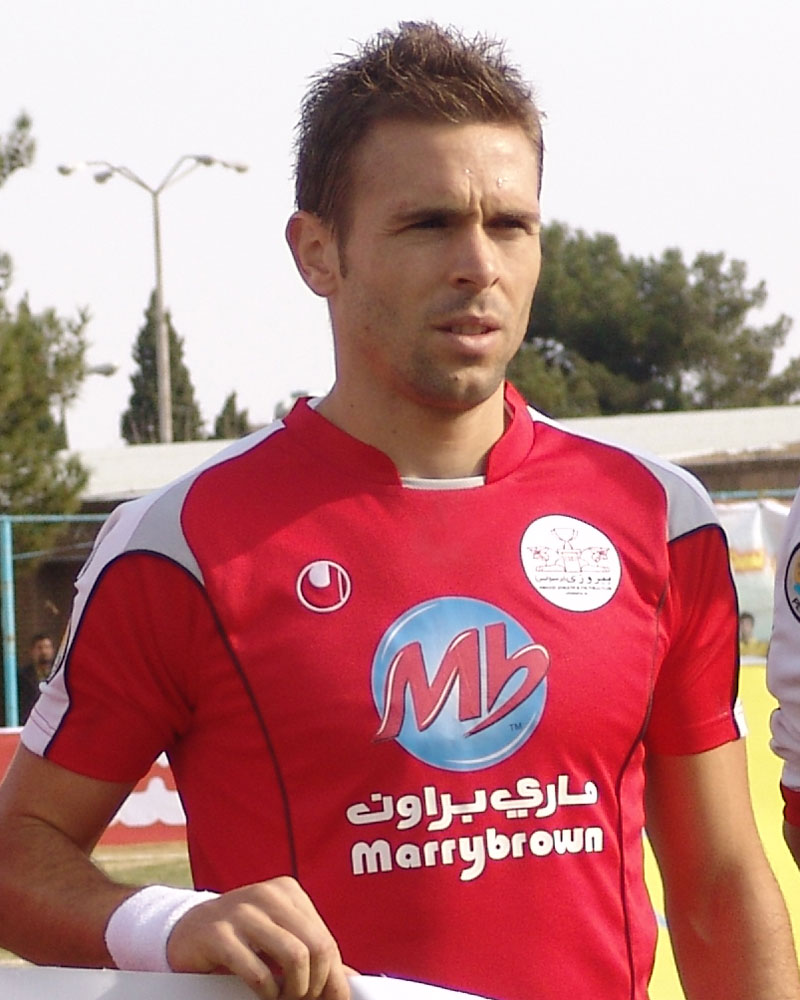

Personal information
- Full name: Ivan Petrović
- Date of birth: 11 January 1980 (age 46)
- Place of birth: Svetozarevo, SFR Yugoslavia
- Height: 1.75 m (5 ft 9 in)
- Positions: Left midfielder; attacking midfielder

Youth career
- 1996–1997: FK Jagodina

Senior career*
Years	Team	Apps	(Gls)
1997–1998	Jagodina	28	(17)
1998–2004	Napredak	104	(20)
2004–2005	Alemannia Aachen	4	(0)
2005–2006	Obilić	12	(1)
2006–2008	Aboomoslem	56	(7)
2008–2009	Persepolis	27	(1)
2009–2012	Shahin	92	(6)
2012–2013	Mes Kerman	27	(0)
2013	Singhtarua	12	(3)
2014	Nakhon Ratchasima	29	(6)
2015	Thai Honda	17	(5)
2015–2016	Bangkok	15	(3)
2016–2017	Global	19	(5)
Total		442	(74)

Managerial career
- 2021-2022: Jagodina
- * Club domestic league appearances and goals

Ivan Petrovic (Serbian Cyrillic: Иван Петровић, born 11 January 1980) is a Serbian footballer.

== Early life and Club career ==
He was born in Svetozarevo (today Jagodina), then part of SFR Yugoslavia (now Serbia). He played many seasons for FK Napredak. In 2004, he was transferred to 2. Bundesliga team Alemannia Aachen but after having an unsuccessful season and playing only four games he returned to Serbia. In 2006, he moved to the Iran Pro League and played for Aboomoslem for two seasons which he became second best player of the whole 2007–08 IPL and the best foreign player of the season. For the next season he moved to Iranian champion Persepolis F.C. where he made the most assists (9) in the 2008–09 season.

=== Global ===
On 1 May 2016, he made his league debut with Global in a 4-2 win against Stallion.

۱

== Honours ==
=== Club ===
Shahin Bushehr

- Hazfi Cup: Runner-up 2011–12

=== Individual ===
- Football Iran News & Events: Foreign player of the year (2007–08)
- Iran Football Federation Award: Foreign player of the year (2007–08)
- Iran Pro League: 2008–09 Most assists (9), shared with Esmail Farhadi and Mohammad Reza Khalatbari, Persepolis
