= Abbas Aghaei =

Iranian footballer

Personal information
- Full name: Abbas Aghaei Chahgoushi
- Date of birth: September 2, 1977 (age 49)
- Place of birth: Sarab, Pahlavi Iran
- Position: Midfielder

Senior career*
Years	Team	Apps	(Gls)
1999–2001	Tractor		
2001–2004	Pas Tehran	45	(15)
2004–2006	Sepahan	48	(12)
2006–2007	Pas Tehran	28	(13)
2007–2008	Persepolis	31	(7)
2008–2009	Saipa	3	(0)
2009–2011	Gostaresh Foolad Tabriz	21	(10)
2011–2012	Damash Gilan	16	(1)
2012–2013	Sang Ahan	10	(1)

International career^{‡}
2000–2008	Iran	4	(0)

Managerial career
- 2015–2017: Gostaresh Foolad (under-21)
- 2015–2017: Gostaresh Foolad (assistant)
- 2017–2018: Machine Sazi Tabriz
- * Club domestic league appearances and goals as of 26 December 2013 ‡ National team caps and goals as of 9 January 2008

Abbas Aghaei (Persian: عباس آقایی, born September 2, 1977, in Sarab, East Azerbaijan) is a retired Iranian football player. He played as a midfielder for Tractor, Pas Tehran, Sepahan and Persepolis in the Iran Pro League as well as for the Iran national team.

== Club career ==
He spent most of his career at Pas Tehran. In 2004, he joined another IPL club, Sepahan, but returned to Pas after two seasons. In July 2007 Aghaei signed a one-year contract with Iranian giants Persepolis F.C., despite numerous offers from the UAE League from clubs such Al-Ahli.

He scored his first goal for Persepolis in August 2007 – a 37-yard free kick during a 2–0 win against Pegah F.C. He also scored the equalizer in the 7th week match against Pas Hamedan with a 25-yard volley.

He scored yet another 40-yard free kick against Sepahan, but it was not enough to prevent Persepolis suffering their first defeat of the season, losing 2–1. In all, he scored 7 goals for Persepolis. He signed a contract with Damash in June 2011.

Club performance			League	
Season	Club	League	Apps	Goals
Iran			League	
2004–05	Sepahan	Pro League	27	6
2005–06	Sepahan	Pro League	21	6
2006–07	Pas	Pro League	28	13
2007–08	Persepolis	Pro League	31	7
2008–09	Saipa	Pro League	3	0
2009–10	Gostaresh	Division 1	?	6
2010–11	Gostaresh	Division 1	22	4
2011–12	Damash	Pro League	16	1
2012–13	Sang Ahan	Division 1	10	1
Total				44

== International career ==
He gained his first international cap for Iran on August 16, 2000, in a friendly versus Georgia. His appearances for the national team have been few, including in October 2006 when he was called up to join Team Melli in an LG cup tournament held in Jordan. In June 2007 he had his fifth cap for Iran in a friendly against Mexico.

== Honours ==
- Iran's Premier Football League Winner: 2
  - 2003/04 with Pas Tehran
  - 2007/08 with Persepolis
- Hazfi Cup Winner: 1
  - 2006 with Sepahan
