= Ali Ahmadi (Iranian footballer) =

Iranian footballer

Personal information
- Full name: Ali Ahmadi
- Date of birth: 21 March 1994 (age 32)
- Place of birth: Azna, Iran
- Height: 1.86 m (6 ft 1 in)
- Position: Centre-back

Team information
- Current team: Nirooye Zamini
- Number: 55

Youth career
- 2009–2010: Reggina
- 2010–2015: Sepahan

Senior career*
Years	Team	Apps	(Gls)
2015–2017	Sepahan	3	(0)
2017–2018	Saba	5	(1)
2018–2019	Sepahan Novin	5	(0)
2019	Naft Masjed Soleyman		
2019–2020	Atrak	1	(0)
2020–	Nirooye Zamini	3	(0)

International career
2012–2014	Iran U20	7	(0)
- * Club domestic league appearances and goals as of 30 June 2021

Ali Ahmadi (Persian: علی احمدی; born 1 March 1994) is an Iranian professional footballer who plays for Nirooye Zamini in the League 2 (Iran).

== Club career statistics ==
- Last Update: 30 June 2021

Club performance			League		Cup		Continental		Total	
Season	Club	League	Apps	Goals	Apps	Goals	Apps	Goals	Apps	Goals
Iran			League		Hazfi Cup		Asia		Total	
Sepahan	Persian Gulf Pro League	2015–16	0	0	0	0	0	0	0	0
Sepahan	Persian Gulf Pro League	2016–17	3	0	2	0	—		5	0
Sepahan	Total		3	0	2	0	0	0	5	0
Saba	Azadegan League	2017–18	5	1	0	0	—		5	1
Career total			8	1	2	0	0	0	10	1
