= Bahador Abdi =

Iranian footballer

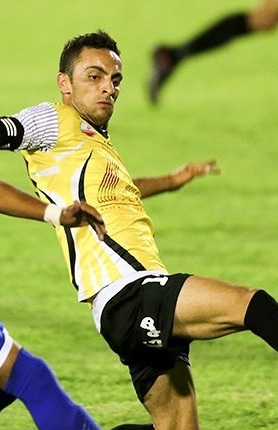

Personal information
- Full name: Bahador Abdi
- Date of birth: 1 May 1984 (age 42)
- Place of birth: Tehran, Iran
- Height: 1.72 m (5 ft 8 in)
- Position: Midfielder

Youth career
- 2000–2002: Shahab Shemiran
- 2002–2003: Sanam
- 2003–2004: Milad

Senior career*
Years	Team	Apps	(Gls)
2004–2005	Pasargad		
2005–2007	Sorkhpooshan		
2007–2009	Persepolis	24	(0)
2009–2010	Shahin Bushehr	29	(3)
2010–2016	Rah Ahan	166	(26)
2016–2017	Paykan	7	(0)
2017	Sanat Naft Abadan	12	(0)
2017–2018	Aluminium Arak		
2018	Karoon Arvand Khorramshahr		
- * Club domestic league appearances and goals

Bahador Abdi (Persian: بهادر عبدی, born on 1 May 1984 in Tehran) is an Iranian former footballer.

== Club career ==
=== Club Career Statistics ===
Last Update 7 August 2014

Club performance			League		Cup		Continental		Total	
Season	Club	League	Apps	Goals	Apps	Goals	Apps	Goals	Apps	Goals
Iran			League		Hazfi Cup		Asia		Total	
2004–05	Pasargad	Division 2		8		2	–			10
2005–06	Sorkhpooshan	Division 1		6		2	–			8
2006–07	Sorkhpooshan	Division 1		7		1	–			8
2007–08	Persepolis	Pro League	17	0	2	0	–		19	0
2008–09	Persepolis	Pro League	7	0	1	1	4	0	12	1
2009–10	Shahin	Pro League	29	3			–			
2010–11	Rah Ahan	Pro League	34	5	1	0	–		35	5
2011–12	Rah Ahan	Pro League	33	9	0	0	–		33	9
2012–13	Rah Ahan	Pro League	33	6	1	0	–		34	6
2013–14	Rah Ahan	Pro League	24	3	3	2	–		27	5
2014–15	Rah Ahan	Pro League	2	0	0	0	–		2	0
Career total							4	0		

- Assist Goals

Season	Team	Assists
09–10	Shahin	1
10–11	Rah Ahan	2
11–12	Rah Ahan	2
12–13	Rah Ahan	4
13–14	Rah Ahan	2
14–15	Rah Ahan	0

== International career ==
He started his international career under head coach Afshin Ghotbi in November 2010 against Nigeria.

== Honours ==
- Iran's Premier Football League Winner: 1
  - 2007–08 with Persepolis
