= Franck Atsou =

Togolese former football player

Personal information
- Full name: Edem Komlan Franck Atsou
- Date of birth: 1 August 1978 (age 48)
- Place of birth: Lomé, Togo
- Height: 6 ft 2 in (1.88 m)
- Position: Defender

Senior career*
Years	Team	Apps	(Gls)
1995–1999	Étoile Filante de Lomé		
1999–2000	Asante Kotoko	27	(6)
2002–2003	Africa Sports	25	(4)
2003–2004	Al Hilal	18	(0)
2004–2005	K. Beringen-Heusden-Zolder	3	(0)
2005–2006	Al Hilal	21	(0)
2006–2008	Aboomoslem	43	(1)
2008–2009	Persepolis	10	(0)
2009–2011	Esteghlal Ahvaz	24	(1)

International career
1996–2010	Togo	46	(1)
- * Club domestic league appearances and goals

Edem Komlan Franck Atsou (born 1 August 1978 in Lomé) is a Togolese former football player who last played for Esteghlal Ahvaz in the Iran Pro League.

== Position ==
He usually played as a defender.

== Club career ==
He moved to the Iranian Club Aboomoslem in 2006 and spent 2 seasons with them before joining the champions Persepolis in 2008 where he stayed for a season and moved to Esteghlal Ahvaz where his team relegated.

== International career ==
He won 46 caps for Togo, the first of which came on 3 November 1996 against Gabon. He was a member of the Togo squad for the 2006 FIFA World Cup.

== Club career statistics ==
Last Update 1 June 2010

Club performance			League		Cup		Continental		Total	
Season	Club	League	Apps	Goals	Apps	Goals	Apps	Goals	Apps	Goals
Iran			League		Hazfi Cup		Asia		Total	
2006–07	Aboomoslem	Persian Gulf Cup	21	0	0	0	-	-	21	0
2007–08	Aboomoslem	Persian Gulf Cup	22	1	0	0	-	-	22	1
2008–09	Persepolis	Persian Gulf Cup	10	0	2	0	0	0	12	0
2009–10	Esteghlal Ahvaz	Persian Gulf Cup	24	1	0	0	-	-	24	1
2010–11	Esteghlal Ahvaz	Azadegan League					-	-		
Total	Iran		77	2	2	0	-	-	79	2
Career total			77	2	2	0	-	-	79	2
