= Kamiar Ghanbari =

Iranian footballer

Personal information
- Full name: Kamiar Ghanbari Parchestan
- Date of birth: 1988 (age 37–38)
- Place of birth: Tehran, Iran
- Position: Defender

Team information
- Current team: Esteghlal Ahvaz

Youth career
- 2000–2007: Pas

Senior career*
Years	Team	Apps	(Gls)
2007–2008	Persepolis	0	(0)
2010–	Esteghlal Ahvaz		

International career^{‡}
2004–2006	Iran U17		
- * Club domestic league appearances and goals as of 16 August 2008 ‡ National team caps and goals as of 16 August 2007

Kamiar Ghanbari (Persian: کامیار قنبری; born 1988 in Tehran) is an Iranian football defender who currently plays for Persepolis F.C. in Iran's Premier Football League. He is a talented left footed defender who can play in the left back and central defender position. He has represented Iran in most youth levels. He left the PAS Tehran F.C. youth system at the beginning of 2007 at the age of 19 after being approved by Hamid Estili he put pen to paper to a contract keeping him at Persepolis until 2010.

== Honours ==
- Iran's Premier Football League Winner: 1
  - 2007/08 with Persepolis
