= Nabiollah Bagheriha =

Iranian football defender (born 1979)

Personal information
- Full name: Nabiollah Bagheriha
- Date of birth: June 15, 1979 (age 47)
- Place of birth: Tehran, Iran
- Position: Defender

Team information
- Current team: Persepolis
- Number: 5

Senior career*
Years	Team	Apps	(Gls)
2004–2006	Oghab		
2006–2007	Teraktor Sazi		
2007–2010	Persepolis	55	(1)
2010–2011	Mes Kerman	21	(1)
2011–2012	Shahrdari Tabriz	1	(0)
2012–2013.	Sanat Naft		
- * Club domestic league appearances and goals as of 5 October 2010 ‡ National team caps and goals as of 9 August 2008

Nabiollah Bagheriha (Persian: نبی‌الله باقری‌ها, born June 15, 1979) is an Iranian football defender who currently plays for Sanat Naft in Iran's Premier Football League.

== Club career ==
After joining Persepolis, everyone thought that he was just going to be a backup that played in the easy matches but toward the end of the 2007–08 season when Mohammad Nosrati was moved from the centre-back position to the left-back position, Bagheriha was placed in the starting line up for important matches.

During the 2008–09 season he became a starter for many games and was placed in the line up for important matches against many rivals and even in the AFC Champions League.

=== Club Career Statistics ===
Last update: 3 August 2011

Club performance			League		Cup		Continental		Total	
Season	Club	League	Apps	Goals	Apps	Goals	Apps	Goals	Apps	Goals
Iran			League		Hazfi Cup		Asia		Total	
2006–07	Tractor Sazi	Division 1					-	-		
2007–08	Persepolis	Pro League	15	0	0	0	-	-	15	0
2008–09	Persepolis	Pro League	25	1	0	0	2	0	27	1
2009–10	Persepolis	Pro League	15	0	0	0	-	-	15	0
2010–11	Mes	Pro League	21	1	0	0	-	-	21	1
2011–12	Shahrdari Tabriz	Pro League	1	0	1	0	-	-	2	0
Career total							2	0		

- Assist Goals

Season	Team	Assists
09–10	Persepolis	1
10–11	Mes	0
2011–12	Shahrdari Tabriz	0

== Honours ==
- Iran's Premier Football League
  - Winner: 1
    - 2007/08 with Persepolis
- Hazfi Cup
  - Winner: 1
    - 2009/10 with Persepolis
