= Jorge Gaona =

Paraguayan footballer (born 1985)

Personal information
- Full name: Jorge Constantino Gaona Aranda
- Date of birth: 26 January 1985 (age 41)
- Place of birth: Asunción, Paraguay
- Height: 1.83 m (6 ft 0 in)
- Position: Midfielder

Senior career*
Years	Team	Apps	(Gls)
- Cerro Porteño
2006–2007	Fernando de la Mora		
2007–2008	Cerro Porteño		
2008	Persepolis	2	(0)

International career
2004–2005	Paraguay U-20		
- * Club domestic league appearances and goals as of 2 May 2008

Jorge Constantino Gaona Aranda, more commonly known as Jorge Gaona (born 26 January 1985 in Asunción), is a Paraguayan football midfielder.

He was part of the Paraguay under-20 squad that competed at the 2005 South American Youth Championship.

== Honours ==
- Iran's Premier Football League Winner: 1
  - 2007–08 with Persepolis
