= Reza Kardoust =

Iranian footballer

Personal information
- Full name: Mohammad Reza Kardoust
- Date of birth: 24 November 1984 (age 41)
- Place of birth: Rasht, Iran
- Height: 1.76 m (5 ft 9 in)
- Position: Midfielder

Youth career
- Sepidrood
- Maskan va Shahrsazi Rasht
- Pegah

Senior career*
Years	Team	Apps	(Gls)
2005–2007	Pegah		
2007–2010	Sepidrood		
2010–2011	Tarbiat Yazd	6	(0)
2011–2013	Gahar Zagros	41	(0)
2013–2014	Damash Gilan	20	(1)
2014–2015	Esteghlal Khuzestan	21	(0)
2015–2017	Aluminium Arak	41	(0)
2018	Sepidrood Rasht	1	(0)
- * Club domestic league appearances and goals

Reza Kardoust (Persian: رضا کاردوست; born 24 November 1984) is an Iranian former football player.

== Club history ==
Born in Rasht, he started his career with Sepidrood and Pegah Gilan youth teams. In 2005 he joined Pegah Gilan senior team. In 2007 he moved to Sepidrood in Iran Football's 2nd Division, in 2010 Sepidrood was promoted to Azadegan League after 11 years and Kardoust was part of the team.

In the next season he was transferred to Tarbiat Yazd under Davoud Mahabadi's management. In 2011 Davoud Mahabadi became Gahar Zagros head coach and took Kardoost with him to the new club. Kardoost helped Gahar to promote to Iran Pro League.

After spending his first season in the Iran Pro League with Gahar, he moved back to his hometown and Damash Gilan in summer 2013. After Damash's relegation, Kardoust joined Esteghlal Khuzestan with a two-year contract.

== Club statistics ==
As of 8 May 2015

Club performance			League	
Season	Club	League	Apps	Goals
Iran			League	
2010–11	Tarbiat Yazd	1st Division	6	0
2011–12	Gahar Zagros	1st Division	24	0
2012–13	Gahar Zagros	Pro League	17	0
2013–14	Damash	Pro League	20	1
2014–15	Est. Khuzestan	Pro League	20	0
Total			87	1
