= Sorkhpooshan Delvar Afzar F.C. =

Sorkhpoushan سرخپوشان
- Full name: Sorkhpooshan Delvar Afzar Tehran Football Club
- Nickname(s): Azarbayjan (former name)
- Founded: October 5, 2003
- Dissolved: October 23, 2008
- Chairman: Iraj Ghorbani
- League: Azadegan League
- 2007–08: Azadegan League Group 1, 6th
Home colours	Away colours

Sorkhpooshan Delvar Afzar (Persian: سرخپوشان دلوارافزار) was a football team based in Tehran, Iran. They played in the Iranian First Division known as the Azadegan League. They were financially backed by Delvar Afzar Industrial Group.

They were also the reserve team of Iranian football's one of the most popular clubs, Persepolis F.C. for 2 seasons.

== Club history ==
The club was originally based in the Iranian province of East Azerbaijan. It was a local club and participated in local club leagues. In 2003, after Ali Parvin left as Persepolis FC's manager, he vowed to never go back, deciding instead to create a new Persepolis. Because Sorkhpooshan is also a nickname of Persepolis FC, and their similar club colors, Parvin along with some other sponsors, bought the team and moved it to Tehran. Former Persepolis players such as Reza Shahroudi joined the team in the 2003–04 season and helped the team reach the Azadegan League. Parvin's dedication to the club was temporary though and he left the club to once again help Persepolis FC. The club was bought by Delvar Afzar Industrial Group and had been in the Azadegan League since the 2004–05 season. On September 19, 2006; Sorkhpooshan's chairman signed a contract with Ansarifar, the chairman of Persepolis FC, establishing Sorkhpooshan as Persepolis' reserve team. They plan on exchanging players, having group training sessions, assisting each other in financial matters and to play friend friendlies against each other.

== Head coaches ==
- (Iran) Hamid Derakhshan
- (Germany) Tomas Suberg
- (Iran) Amirhossein Peyrovani (2006)
- (Serbia) Valdo Pejovic
- (Iran) Faraz Kamalvand
- (Iran) ?
- (Iran) Hamid Alidoosti (2006–2008)
- (Iran) Faraz Kamalvand (2008)
