= 2011–12 Rah Ahan F.C. season =

Rah Ahan FC
2011–12 season
- Chairman: Mohammad Hassan Ansarifard
- Manager: Ali Daei
- Stadium: Rah Ahan Stadium, Tehran
- IPL: 11th
- Hazfi Cup: Round of 32
- Top goalscorer: League: Omid Alishah; All: Omid Alishah
- Highest home attendance: 30,000
- Lowest home attendance: 1,000
Home colours	Away colours

The 2011–12 season will be Rah Ahan Football Club's 7th season in the Iran Pro League, and their 65th consecutive season in the top division of Iranian football. They will also be competing in the Hazfi Cup and 75th year in existence as a football club.

== Player ==
=== Iran Pro League squad ===
As of August 3, 2011 Note: Flags indicate national team as defined under FIFA eligibility rules; some limited exceptions apply. Players may hold more than one non-FIFA nationality.

No.	Pos.	Nation	Player
1	GK	IRN	Farshid Karimi
2	MF	IRN	Omid Alishah
3	DF	IRN	Mohsen Mirabi
4	DF	IRN	Mirhani Hashemi
5	DF	IRN	Ebrahim Karimi
7	DF	IRN	Majid Bajlan
6	MF	IRN	Hamed Noormohammadi
8	MF	IRN	Hossein Pashaei
9	MF	IRN	Sattar Zare
10	MF	IRN	Bahador Abdi
11	FW	IRN	Iman Razaghirad
12	FW	IRN	Mojtaba Shiri
13	DF	IRN	Hossein Kaabi
14	MF	IRN	Hossein Kazemi
15	FW	BRA	Anderson Gomez

No.	Pos.	Nation	Player
17	MF	IRN	Maysam Aghaei
18	MF	IRN	Ali Amiri
19	FW	IRN	Mahmoud Al Amenah
20	MF	IRN	Saeid Chahjouei
21	DF	IRN	Mehdi Zarei
22	GK	IRN	Aria Hassanzadeh
23	GK	IRN	Hassan Roudbarian
24	MF	IRN	Mehrdad Kafshgari
25	MF	IRN	Mohammad Sadegh Barani
27	DF	IRN	Ali Gholam
28	FW	IRN	Alireza Abbasfard
29	??	IRN	Amir Tahmorasi
31	??	IRN	Saeed Lotfi
-	FW	IRN	Hossein Koushki

For recent transfers, see List of Iranian football transfers, summer 2011.

== Transfers ==
Confirmed transfers 2011–12

- Updated on 1 August 2011

In: Note: Flags indicate national team as defined under FIFA eligibility rules; some limited exceptions apply. Players may hold more than one non-FIFA nationality.

No.	Pos.	Nation	Player
13	DF	IRN	Hossein Kaebi (from Steel Azin)
14	MF	IRN	Hossein Kazemi (from Steel Azin)
9	MF	IRN	Sattar Zare (from Shahin Bushehr)
20	MF	IRN	Saeid Chahjouei (from Aboomoslem)
—	MF	IRN	Ali Amiri (from Damash Gilan)
27	MF	IRN	Ali Gholam (from Paykan)
24	MF	IRN	Mehrdad Kafshgari (from Gahar Zagros)
28	FW	IRN	Alireza Abbasfard (from Paykan)
22	GK	IRN	Aria Hassanzadeh (from Mes Kerman)
—	FW	BRA	Anderson Gomes (from (Brazil) Grêmio Barueri)
2	MF	IRN	Omid Alishah (from Naft Tehran)

Out: Note: Flags indicate national team as defined under FIFA eligibility rules; some limited exceptions apply. Players may hold more than one non-FIFA nationality.

No.	Pos.	Nation	Player
31	MF	IRN	Mohammad Saleh Khalil Azad (to Fajr Sepasi)
77	MF	LTU	Mantas Savėnas (to (Russia) Gazovik Orenburg)
16	MF	IRN	Mohsen Zahedi (to Mes Sarcheshmeh)
20	DF	IRN	Abouzar Rahimi (to Damash Gilan)
9	MF	IRN	Kamal Kamyabinia (to Shahrdari Tabriz)
27	FW	IRN	Amin Motevaselzadeh (to Foolad)
17	FW	SYR	Mahmoud Al Amenah (Released)

== Competitions ==
Competition	Started round	Current position / round	Final position / round	First match	Last match
2011–12 Persian Gulf Cup	—	11th		2 August 2011	11 May 2012
2011–12 Hazfi Cup	—	—			

Updated to match played 12 January 2011
Source: Competitions

=== Iran Pro League ===
==== Standings ====
Pos	Team	Pld	W	D	L	GF	GA	GD	Pts
9	Mes Kerman	34	11	10	13	35	39	−4	43
10	Sanat Naft	34	11	10	13	49	57	−8	43
11	Rah Ahan	34	9	15	10	43	42	+1	42
12	Persepolis	34	10	12	12	50	54	−4	42
13	Fajr Sepasi	34	10	11	13	31	38	−7	41

Updated to match(es) played on 11 May 2012. Source: varzesh3.com
Rules for classification: 1) points; 2) goal difference; 3) number of goals scored.

==== Results summary ====
Overall								Home						Away					
Pld	W	D	L	GF	GA	GD	Pts	W	D	L	GF	GA	GD	W	D	L	GF	GA	GD
34	9	15	10	43	42	+1	42	5	7	5	22	20	+2	4	8	5	21	22	−1

Last updated: 6 May 2012.
Source: Ipl Stats

==== Results by round ====
Round	1	2	3	4	5	6	7	8	9	10	11	12	13	14	15	16	17	18	19	20	21	22	23	24	25	26	27	28	29	30	31	32	33	34
Ground	H	A	H	A	H	A	H	A	H	A	H	A	H	A	A	H	A	A	H	A	H	A	H	A	H	A	H	A	H	A	H	H	A	H
Result	D	D	L	D	W	D	D	L	L	D	D	D	D	D	D	D	D	W	L	L	W	L	W	W	L	L	D	L	W	W	L	D	W	W
Position	4	8	15	14	11	11	12	13	16	16	16	15	15	16	16	15	14	14	15	16	15	16	13	12	13	15	15	15	14	13	15	15	14	11

Updated to match(es) played on 6 May 2012. Source: "Ipl".
A = Away; H = Home; W = Win; D = Draw; L = Loss

==== Matches ====
Win Draw Loss

August 2, 2011 Round 1	Rah Ahan	2–2	Zob Ahan	Tehran
22:00 UTC+04:30	Alishah 60'; Abbasfard 90'; Alishah (yellow card); Kaebi (yellow card)	Report	Own goal 15'; Castro 83'; Haghi (yellow card); Castro (yellow card)	Stadium: Rah Ahan Stadium; Attendance: 30.000; Referee: Mahmoud Rafiei

August 7, 2011 2	Malavan	0–0	Rah Ahan	Anzali
22:00 UTC+04:30	Mosalman (yellow card); Hamrang (yellow card)	Report	Alishah (yellow card); Noormohammadi (yellow card); Kaabi (yellow card)	Stadium: Takhti Stadium; Attendance: 0 Referee: Haj Babaei

August 12, 2011 3	Rah Ahan	0–2	Saba Qom	Tehran
22:00 UTC+04:30		Report		Stadium: Rah Ahan Stadium; Attendance: 200

August 17, 2011 4	Naft Tehran	2–2	Rah Ahan	Tehran
22:00 UTC+04:30	Mousavi 37', 76'; Narciso (yellow card); Fathi (yellow card); Mehrazma (yellow card)	Report	Abbasfard 32'; Kazemi 56'; Abbasfard (yellow card); Noormohammadi (red card)	Stadium: Dastgerdi Stadium; Attendance: 200; Referee: Maleki

August 24, 2011 5	Rah Ahan	3–1	Mes Sarcheshmeh	Tehran
22:00 UTC+04:30	Abdi 37'; Alishah 45'; Kazemi 89'; Bajlan (yellow card); Gholam (yellow card); Pashaei (yellow card)	Report	Firoozabadi 70'; Houri (yellow card); Aliabadi (yellow card); Mozafarzadeh (yellow card); Baghlani (yellow card)	Stadium: Rah Ahan Stadium; Attendance: 2,000; Referee: Khorshidi

September 8, 2011 6	Shahrdari Tabriz	2–2	Rah Ahan	Tabriz
19:10 UTC+04:30	Bazri 76'; Mohammadreza Zeynalkheyri 88'; Mohammadreza Zeynalkheyri (red card); Dadashvand (yellow card)	Report	Alishah 13'; Hashemi 17'	Stadium: Yadegar-e Emam Stadium; Attendance: 3,000; Referee: Afshar

September 15, 2011 7	Rah Ahan	1–1	Fajr Sepasi	Tehran
18:30 UTC+04:30	Abdi 60'; Kaabi (yellow card); Alishah (yellow card); Abbasfard (yellow card)	Report	Karimian 88'	Stadium: Rah Ahan Stadium; Attendance: 1,000; Referee: Ghahremani

September 25, 2011 8	Damash Gilan	3–1	Rah Ahan	Rasht
17:30 UTC+03:30	Nazifkar 21'; Zeneyedpour 48', 51'; Nazifkar (yellow card); Zeneyedpour (yellow card)	Report	Alishah 45'; Pashaei (yellow card); Zare (yellow card)	Stadium: Dr. Azodi Stadium; Attendance: 5,000; Referee: Mombaini

September 30, 2011 9	Rah Ahan	0–2	Sanat Naft	Tehran
17:30 UTC+03:30		Report	Founéké Sy 56', 76'; Founéké Sy (yellow card); Amiri (yellow card)	Stadium: Rah Ahan Stadium; Attendance: 1,000; Referee: Haj Babaei

October 14, 2011 10	Esteghlal Tehran	1–1	Rah Ahan	Tehran
18:15 UTC+03:30	Jabari 75'; Hamoudi (yellow card); Teymourian (yellow card); Jabari (yellow card); Sharifat (yellow card)	Report	Abbasfard 17'; Chahjouei (yellow card); Pashaei (yellow card); Kazemi (yellow card)	Stadium: Azadi Stadium; Attendance: 30,000; Referee: Rafiei

October 20, 2011 11	Rah Ahan	1–1	Sepahan	Tehran
15:15 UTC+03:30	Hashemi 17'; Tahmorasi (yellow card)	Report	Januário 15'; Jamshidian (yellow card); JafarPour (yellow card); Beikzadeh (yellow card); Hosseini (yellow card)	Stadium: Rah Ahan Stadium; Attendance: 2,000; Referee: Ghahremani

October 31, 2011 12	Mes Kerman	0–0	Rah Ahan	Kerman
16:15 UTC+03:30	Dehnavi (yellow card); Pooladi (yellow card)	Report	Abdi (yellow card); Razaghirad (yellow card); Alishah (yellow card)	Stadium: Shahid Bahonar Stadium; Attendance: 7,000; Referee: Faghani

November 18, 2011 13	Rah Ahan	2–2	Saipa	Tehran
14:20 UTC+03:30	Kazemi 22', 39'; Gholam (yellow card)	Report	Shahbazzadeh 81'; Gharibi 90'; Mehdikhani (yellow card)	Stadium: Rah Ahan Stadium; Attendance: 1,000; Referee: Salehi

November 24, 2011 14	Tractor Sazi	1–1	Rah Ahan	Tabriz
14:45 UTC+03:30	Tosi 90'	Report	Kazemi 45'; Abbasfard (yellow card); Alishah (yellow card)	Stadium: Yadegar-e-Emam Stadium; Attendance: 13,000; Referee: Mohsen Torki

December 3, 2011 15	Foolad	0–0	Rah Ahan	Ahvaz
15:15 UTC+03:30	Rafaei (yellow card); Afshin (yellow card)	Report		Stadium: Takhti Stadium (Ahvaz); Attendance: 6,000; Referee: Mozafarizadeh

December 15, 2011 16	Rah Ahan	1–1	Perspolis	Tehran
16:15 UTC+03:30	Abdi 76'; Alishah (yellow card); Abbasfard (yellow card)	Report	Nouri 39'; Haghighi (yellow card); Mamadou Tall (yellow card)	Stadium: Azadi Stadium; Attendance: 20,000; Referee: Faghani

December 19, 2011 17	Shahin Bushehr	0–0	Rah Ahan	Bushehr
15:00 UTC+03:30		Report	Pashaei (yellow card); Roudbarian (yellow card)	Stadium: Shahid Beheshti Stadium; Attendance: 5,000; Referee: Vahedi

January 5, 2012 18	Zob Ahan	0–2	Rah Ahan	Isfahan
15:00 UTC+03:30	Ali Ahmadi (yellow card)	Report	Alishah 42'; Abbasfard 90'; Karimi (yellow card); Kaabi (yellow card)	Stadium: Foolad Shahr Stadium; Attendance: 1,000; Referee: Bakhshi Zadeh

January 10, 2012 19	Rah Ahan	0–1	Malavan	Tehran
15:00 UTC+03:30	Kaabi (yellow card); Abbasfard (yellow card); Pashaei (yellow card)	Report	Rafkhaei 62'; Pourgholami (yellow card); Nozhati (yellow card)	Stadium: Rah Ahan Stadium; Attendance: 1,000; Referee: Salehi

January 15, 2012 20	Saba Qom	2–1	Rah Ahan	Qom
15:00 UTC+03:30	Molaei 18'; Enayati 85'; Bakhtiarizadeh (yellow card); Lak (yellow card); Kashi (yellow card)	Report	Alishah 35'; Alishah (yellow card)	Stadium: Yadegar Emam Stadium; Attendance: 1,000; Referee: Daneshmehr

January 20, 2012 21	Rah Ahan	2–1	Naft Tehran	Tehran
15:00 UTC+03:30	Noormohammadi 2'; Alishah 93'; Al Amenah (yellow card); Kazemi (yellow card)	Report	Zarei 58'; Zarei (yellow card); Hakhamaneshi (yellow card); Kouroshi (yellow card)	Stadium: Rah Ahan Stadium; Attendance: 1,000; Referee: Kermanshahi

January 25, 2012 22	Mes Sarcheshme	2–1	Rah Ahan	Kerman
15:30 UTC+03:30	Aliabadi 11'; Samereh 23'; Oveis Kordjahan (yellow card); Aliabadi (yellow card); Houri (yellow card); Mansouri (yellow card); Ebrahimi (yellow card); Samereh (yellow card); Mozarafizadeh (red card)	Report	Alishah 58'; Noormohammadi (yellow card); Kaabi (red card)	Stadium: Shahid Bahonar Stadium; Attendance: 3,000; Referee: Haj Babaei

January 29, 2012 23	Rah Ahan	2–1	Shahrdari Tabriz	Tehran
15:30 UTC+03:30	Alishah 52'; Razaghirad 85'; Kafshgari (yellow card)	Report	Beyranvand 90+3'; Kamyabinia (yellow card); Ghafouri (yellow card); Dragan Žarković (red card)	Stadium: Rah Ahan Stadium; Attendance: 1,000; Referee: Bakhshizadeh

February 3, 2012 24	Fajr Sepasi	1–2	Rah Ahan	Shiraz
15:30 UTC+03:30	Nazari 80'; Shafiei (yellow card); Afand (yellow card); Pourmohammad (yellow card)	Report	Abdi 11'; Kaabi 48'; Nootmohammadi (yellow card); Abbasfard (yellow card); Pashaei (yellow card)	Stadium: Hafezieh Stadium; Attendance: 1,000; Referee: Salehi

February 9, 2012 25	Rah Ahan	0–1	Damash Gilan	Tehran
15:30 UTC+03:30	Gholam (yellow card); Kaabi (yellow card); Karimi (yellow card)	Report	Chavoshi 11'; Rahimi (yellow card); Asgari (yellow card); Alves (yellow card)	Stadium: Rah Ahan Stadium; Attendance: 500; Referee: Seyd Ali

February 14, 2012 26	Sanat Naft	2–1	Rah Ahan	Abadan
16:00 UTC+03:30	Founéké Sy 23'; Moshkelpour 90'; Koohnavard (yellow card)	Report	Shiri 10'; Kaabi (yellow card); Zarei (yellow card); Abdi (red card)	Stadium: Takhti Stadium; Attendance: 5,000; Referee: BakhshiZadeh

10 March 2012 27	Rah Ahan	2–2	Esteghlal Tehran	Tehran
15:30 UTC+03:30	Abdi 02'; Kazemi 16'; Barani (yellow card)	Report	Samuel 24'; Montazeri 52'; Heydari (yellow card); Amirabadi (yellow card)	Stadium: Azadi Stadium; Attendance: 5,000; Referee: Ghahremani

17 March 2012 28	Sepahan	3–2	Rah Ahan	Fooladshahr
16:00 UTC+03:30	Bruno César Correa 54', 69', 88'; Seyed Salehi (yellow card); Bengar (red card)	report	Kazemi 56'; Razaghirad 90+4'; Abdi (yellow card); Mojtaba Shiri (yellow card)	Stadium: Folād Shahr Stadium; Attendance: 5,000; Referee: Mohsen Torki

6 April 2012 29	Rah Ahan	2–0	Mes Kerman	Tehran
17:00 UTC+03:30	Shiri 68'; Hejazipour 70' kazemi (red card)	Report	Hasanzadeh (red card); Kolahkaj (red card)	Stadium: Rah Ahan Stadium; Attendance: 1,000; Referee: Ghahremani

13 April 2012 30	Saipa	0–1	Rah Ahan	Karaj
17:00 UTC+03:30	Zeynali (yellow card)	Report	Shiri 74'; Abbasfard (yellow card)	Stadium: Enghelab Stadium; Attendance: 2,000; Referee: Zargar

21 April 2012 31	Rah Ahan	0–1	Tractor Sazi	Tehran
17:00 UTC+03:30		Report	Akbarpour (yellow card); Flávio Paixão (yellow card); Sadeghi 86'	Stadium: Takhti Stadium; Attendance: 5,000; Referee: Hajipour

27 April 2012 32	Rah Ahan	0–0	Foolad	Tehran
17:00 UTC+03:30	Khanzadeh (yellow card)	Report	Rahmani (yellow card); Nasari (yellow card)	Stadium: Rah Ahan Stadium; Attendance: 1,000; Referee: Salehi

May 6, 2012 33	Perspolis	3–4	Rah Ahan	Tehran
17:00 UTC+04:30	Éamon Zayed 20', 81', 87'; Éamon Zayed (yellow card); Aliasgari (yellow card)	Report	Abdi 19', 45', 78'; Kazemi 74'; Kaabi (yellow card); Gharzoul (yellow card)	Stadium: Azadi Stadium; Attendance: 2,000; Referee: Mohsen Torki

May 11, 2012 34	Rah Ahan	4–1	Shahin Bushehr	Tehran
17:00 UTC+04:30	Mojtaba Shiri 17', 45'; Abdi 19'; Abbasfard 61'; Ali Gholam (yellow card); Mohammad Reza Khanzadeh (yellow card)	Report	Own goal 45'; Bayat (yellow card); Aziz-Mohammadi (yellow card)	Stadium: Rah Ahan Stadium; Attendance: 500; Referee: Bonyadifar

=== Hazfi Cup ===
==== Matches ====
Win Draw Loss

===== Round of 32 =====
October 26, 2011 1/32	Mehr Karaj	3–1	Rah Ahan	Karaj
15:00 UTC+03:30				Stadium: Enghelab Stadium; Attendance: 1,000; Referee: Salehi

=== Friendly Matches ===
Win Draw Loss

v

== Statistics ==
=== Top scorers ===
Includes all competitive matches. The list is sorted by shirt number when total goals are equal.

Last updated on 14 February 2012

Ran	No.	Pos	Nat	Name	Pro League	Hazfi Cup	Total
1	2	MF	(Iran)	Omid Alishah	9	0	9
1	14	MF	(Iran)	Hossein Kazemi	9	0	9
1	10	MF	(Iran)	Bahador Abdi	9	0	9
2	28	FW	(Iran)	Alireza Abbasfard	5	0	5
2	12	FW	(Iran)	Mojtaba Shiri	5	0	5
3	7	DF	(Iran)	Majid Bajlan	2	0	2
3	4	DF	(Iran)	Mirhani Hashemi	2	0	2
3	11	FW	(Iran)	Iman Razaghirad	2	0	2
3	30	FW	(Iran)	Hossein Hejazi Pour	2	0	2
4
4	13	DF	(Iran)	Hossein Kaabi	1	0	1
4	6	MF	(Iran)	Hamed Noormohammadi	1	0	1
TOTALS					47	0	47

Friendlies and Pre season goals are not recognized as competitive match goals.

=== Top assistors ===
Includes all competitive matches. The list is sorted by shirt number when total assistors are equal.

Ranking	Position	Nation	Name	Pro League	Hazfi Cup	Total
1	MF	(Iran)	Hossein Kazemi	4	0	4
1	FW	(Iran)	Hossein Hejazi Pour	4	0	4
2	FW	(Iran)	Alireza Abbasfard	3	0	3
2	MF	(Iran)	Omid Alishah	3	0	3
3	FW	(Iran)	Mojtaba Shiri	2	0	2
4	DF	(Iran)	Hossein Kaabi	1	0	1
4	MF	(Iran)	Hamed Noormohammadi	1	0	1
4	MF	(Syria)	Mahmoud Al Amenah	1	0	1
4	DF	(Iran)	Mehdi Zarei	1	0	1
TOTALS				20	0	20

Friendlies and Pre season goals are not recognized as competitive match assist.

=== Own goals ===
- Updated on 2 April 2011

Position	Nation	Number	Name	Pro League	Hazfi Cup	Total
MF	(Iran)	14	Hossein Kazemi	1	0	1
MF	(Tunisia)	15	Mohamed Ali Gharzoul	1	0	1
TOTALS				2	0	2

== Club ==
=== Coaching staff ===
Position	Name
Head coach	(Iran) Ali Daei
Assistant coach	(Croatia) Željko Mijač
Assistant coach	(Iran) Yahya Golmohammadi
Goalkeeping coach	(Iran) Behzad Gholampour
Doctor	(Iran) Dr. Behshad Moshfeghi
Team director	(Iran) Ali Nikjoo

=== Other information ===
Chairman	(Iran) Mohammad Hassan Ansarifard
Ground (capacity and dimensions)	Rah Ahan Stadium (20,000 / )

Updated to match played 1 October 2010

== See also ==
- 2011–12 Persian Gulf Cup
- 2011–12 Hazfi Cup
