= 2001 AK Pipe International Cup =

Tournament details
- Host country: Iran
- Dates: 15 October – 17 October
- Teams: 4 (from 1 confederation)
- Venue: 1 (in 1 host cities)

Final positions
- Champions: (Iran) Aboomoslem (1st title)
- Runners-up: (Iran) Fajr Sepasi
- Third place: (Iran) Esteghlal

Tournament statistics
- Matches played: 4
- Goals scored: 16 (4 per match)
- Top scorer: (Iran) Reza Enayati (5 goals)

The 2001 AK Pipe International Cup was a friendly football tournament that took place in Mashhad, Iran. The tournament was sponsored by Aria Kavan Trading & Production Group.

Revenues generated from ticket sales for this tournament went towards refugees from war torn Afghanistan.

Köpetdag Aşgabat fielded two Iranian footballers in the game against Aboomoslem, the two were Ali Khosravi and Mehdi Khazaei.

== Participant teams ==
Initially this tournament was going to be held in August 2001 and the four participants were going to be Persepolis F.C., Partsazan Khorasan, Köpetdag Aşgabat and AK Pipe Mashhad. However Persepolis F.C. decided not to take part in the tournament due to several players' injuries.

The tournament was postponed to October and the participants were as follow:

(Iran) Esteghlal	Azadegan League 2000–01 - Champion
(Iran) Fajr Sepasi	Hazfi Cup 2000-01 - Champion
(Iran) Aboomoslem	2nd Division 2000-01 - Champion
(Turkmenistan) Köpetdag	Turkmenistan League 2000 - Champion

== Semifinals ==
15 October 2001

(Iran) Aboomoslem	7 – 1	(Turkmenistan) Köpetdag
Enayati 25' 41' 54'; Aliyev 56' 63'; Rajabi 43'; Shokri 89'	Report	Bayramov 80'

Takhti Stadium
Referee: Alireza Jafarzadeh (Iran)
15 October 2001

(Iran) Esteghlal	0 – 0 (a.e.t.)	(Iran) Fajr Sepasi
Penalties
	3 – 4

Takhti Stadium

== Third place Match ==
17 October 2001

(Iran) Esteghlal	4 – 0	(Turkmenistan) Köpetdag
Navazi, Majidi, Guliev, Mousavi	Report

Takhti Stadium

== Final ==
17 October 2001

(Iran) Aboomoslem	3–1	(Iran) Fajr Sepasi
Enayati (2 goals), Mikaeili		Tahmasebi

Takhti Stadium

== Statistics ==
=== Top scorers ===
Position	Player	Club	Goals	
1	(Iran) Reza Enayati	(Iran) Aboomoslem	5	
2	(Azerbaijan) Pasha Aliyev	(Iran) Aboomoslem	2	
3	(Iran) Hamid Rajabi	(Iran) Aboomoslem	1	
3	(Iran) Ramazan Shokri	(Iran) Aboomoslem	1	
3	(Turkmenistan) Nazar Bayramov	(Turkmenistan) Köpetdag	1	
3	(Iran) Mohammad Navazi	(Iran) Esteghlal	1	
3	(Iran) Farzad Majidi	(Iran) Esteghlal	1	
3	(Azerbaijan) Rafat Guliev	(Iran) Esteghlal	1	
3	(Iran) Ali Mousavi	(Iran) Esteghlal	1	
3	(Iran) Dariush Mikaeili	(Iran) Aboomoslem	1	
3	(Iran) Bahman Tahmasebi	(Iran) Fajr Sepasi	1	
_	OG		0	
_	Penalty Goals		0	
_	Total goals			16
Total games			4	

=== Cards ===
Position	Player	Club	Yellow card	Yellow card Red card	Red card	Total	
1	(Iran) Hasan Razaqpour	(Iran) Aboomoslem	1	0	0	1	
1	(Turkmenistan) Sergei Leonov	(Turkmenistan) Köpetdag	1	0	0	1	1
Total Cards		?	?	?	?	1	1

== Champion ==
AK Pipe International Cup
2001 Winners
Aboomoslem
