= 2011–12 Persian Gulf Cup =

11th season of Persian Gulf Pro League

Persian Gulf Cup
- Season: 2011–12
- Champions: Sepahan; 4th Pro League title 4th Iranian title
- Relegated: Shahin Bushehr; Shahrdari Tabriz; Mes Sarcheshmeh
- Champions League: Sepahan; Tractor Sazi; Esteghlal; Saba Qom
- Matches: 306
- Goals: 720 (2.35 per match)
- Top goalscorer: Karim Ansarifard (21 goals)
- Biggest home win: Saipa 5–0 Fajr Sepasi (9 March 2012)
- Biggest away win: Mes Sarcheshmeh 0–4 Damash (18 November 2011); Sanat Naft 0–4 Saipa (19 December 2011)
- Highest scoring: Malavan 3–4 Sepahan (7 April 2012)
- Longest winning run: 7 matches Sepahan
- Longest unbeaten run: 13 matches Zob Ahan
- Longest winless run: 12 matches Rah Ahan
- Longest losing run: 4 matches Mes Sarcheshmeh; Mes Kerman
- Highest attendance: 100,000; Persepolis – Esteghlal (16 September 2011)
- Lowest attendance: 0 (spectator ban); Tractor Sazi – Saba Qom (2 August 2011); Malavan – Rah Ahan (7 August 2011); Tractor Sazi – Shahin Bushehr (11 August 2011); Shahin Bushehr – Tractor Sazi (15 January 2012); Damash – Sepahan (3 February 2012)
- Total attendance: 2,856,000
- Average attendance: 9,488

The 2011–12 Persian Gulf Cup (also known as Iran Pro League) was the 29th season of Iran's Football League and 11th as Iran Pro League since its establishment in 2001. Sepahan were the defending champions. The season featured 15 teams from the 2010–11 Persian Gulf Cup and three new teams promoted from the 2010–11 Azadegan League: Damash as champions, Mes Sarcheshmeh and Fajr Sepasi. The league started on 2 August 2011 and ended on 11 May 2012. Sepahan won the Pro League title for the fourth time in their history (total fourth Iranian title). Saipa's Karim Ansarifard's 21 goals made him the top scorer.

== Teams ==
=== Stadia and locations ===
Locations of clubs in 2011–12 Persian Gulf Cup

Team	City	Venue	Capacity
Damash Gilan	Rasht	Dr. Azodi	11,000
Esteghlal	Tehran	Azadi	95,225
Fajr Sepasi	Shiraz	Hafezieh	22,000
Foolad	Ahvaz	Takhti Ahvaz	12,000
Malavan	Anzali	Takhti Anzali	8,000
Mes Kerman	Kerman	Shahid Bahonar	12,000
Mes Sarcheshmeh	Sarcheshmeh	Shahid Bahonar	12,000
Naft Tehran	Tehran	Dastgerdi	8,250
Persepolis	Tehran	Azadi	95,225
Rah Ahan	Shahr-e-Rey	Rah Ahan	12,000
Saba Qom	Qom	Yadegar Emam Qom	10,610
Saipa	Karaj	Enghelab Karaj	14,000
Sanat Naft	Abadan	Takhti Abadan	25,000
Sepahan	Esfahan	Foolad Shahr	15,000
Shahin	Bushehr	Shahid Beheshti	14,000
Shahrdari Tabriz	Tabriz	Yadegar Emam Tabriz	66,833
Tractor Sazi	Tabriz	Yadegar Emam Tabriz	80,451
Zob Ahan	Esfahan	Foolad Shahr	15,000

=== Personnel and kits ===
Note: Flags indicate national team as has been defined under FIFA eligibility rules. Players may hold more than one non-FIFA nationality.

Team	Manager	Captain	Kit manufacturer	Shirt sponsor	Past Season
Damash	(Iran) Mehdi Tartar	(Iran) Reza Mahdavi	Adidas	Damash Shahr Baran	Promoted
Esteghlal	(Iran) Parviz Mazloomi	(Iran) Mojtaba Jabbari	Uhlsport	City Bank	2nd
Fajr Sepasi	(Iran) Mahmoud Yavari	(Iran) Mehdi Rajabzadeh	Majid	HICE	Promoted
Foolad	(Iran) Majid Jalali	(Iran) Jalal Kameli Mofrad	Uhlsport	Foolad Khuzestan Co.	6th
Malavan	(Iran) Farhad Pourgholami	(Iran) Babak Pourgholami	Majid	Iran Navy	8th
Mes Kerman	(Iran) Ebrahim Ghasempour	(Iran) Farzad Hosseinkhani	Uhlsport	Resalat Bank	7th
Mes Sarcheshmeh	(Iran) Asghar Sharafi	(Iran) Ali Samereh	Uhlsport	None	Promoted
Naft Tehran	(Iran) Hossein Faraki	(Iran) Hamid Reza Fathi	Uhlsport	National Iranian Oil Company	13th
Persepolis	(Turkey) Mustafa Denizli	(Iran) Ali Karimi	Uhlsport	Opel	4th
Rah Ahan	(Iran) Ali Daei	(Iran) Hossein Pashaei	Daei	Refah Bank	15th
Saba Qom	(Iran) Abdollah Veisi	(Iran) Sohrab Bakhtiarizadeh	Majid	Vegal	10th
Saipa	(Iran) Mojtaba Taghavi	(Iran) Ebrahim Sadeghi	Uhlsport	SAIPA	11th
Sanat Naft	(Portugal) José Alberto Costa	(Iran) Abbas Merdasi	Majid	National Iranian Oil Company	9th
Sepahan	(Croatia) Zlatko Kranjčar	(Iran) Moharram Navidkia	Lotto	Foolad Mobarakeh Complex	Champion
Shahin	(Iran) Hamid Derakhshan	(Iran) Vahid Talebloo	Uhlsport	Post Bank	14th
Shahrdari Tabriz	(Iran) Ali Asghar Modir Roosta	(Iran) Ebrahim Mirzapour	Majid	City Bank	12th
Tractor Sazi	(Iran) Amir Ghalenoei	(Iran) Morteza Assadi	Uhlsport	Hamrah-e-Avval	5th
Zob Ahan	(Iran) Mansour Ebrahimzadeh	(Iran) Mohammad Salsali	Uhlsport	Zob Ahan Steel Co.	3rd

== Managerial changes ==
=== Before the start of the season ===
Team	Outgoing head coach	Manner of departure	Date of vacancy	Position in table	Incoming head coach	Date of appointment
Saipa	(Iran) Mayeli Kohan	Contract expired	21 May 2011	11th (2010–11)	(Iran) Majid Saleh	6 June 2011
Sepahan	(Iran) Amir Ghalenoei	Contract expired	5 June 2011	1st (2010–11)	(Croatia) Luka Bonačić	22 June 2011
Tractor Sazi	(Iran) Faraz Kamalvand	Contract expired	13 June 2011	5th (2010–11)	(Iran) Amir Ghalenoei	22 June 2011
Persepolis	(Iran) Ali Daei	Contract expired	14 June 2011	4th (2010–11)	(Iran) Hamid Estili	21 June 2011
Shahrdari	(Iran) Hamid Derakhshan	Sacked	18 June 2011	12th (2010–11)	(Serbia) Miodrag Ješić	18 June 2011
Shahin Bushehr	(Iran) Akbar Misaghian	Sacked	19 June 2011	14th (2010–11)	(Iran) Hamid Derakhshan	26 June 2011
Rah Ahan	(Iran) Mehdi Tartar	Sacked	14 July 2011	15th (2010–11)	(Iran) Ali Daei	14 July 2011

=== In season ===
Team	Outgoing head coach	Manner of departure	Date of vacancy	Position in table	Incoming head coach	Date of appointment
Sanat Mes Kerman	(Iran) Samad Marfavi	Resigned	25 August 2011	17th	(Bosnia and Herzegovina) Miroslav Blažević	9 September 2011
Mes Sarcheshmeh	(Iran) Ahmad Sanjari	Sacked	26 August 2011	18th	(Iran) Asghar Sharafi	27 August 2011
Damash Gilan	(Iran) Mehdi Dinvarzadeh	Sacked	18 September 2011	16th	(Iran) Ebrahim Ghasempour	20 September 2011
Shahin Bushehr	(Iran) Hamid Derakhshan	Resigned	5 October 2011	9th	(Iran) Firouz Karimi	6 October 2011
Sepahan Isfahan	(Croatia) Luka Bonacic	Sacked	14 October 2011	5th	(Croatia) Zlatko Kranjcar	31 October 2011
Fajr Sepasi Shiraz	(Iran) Ali Kalantari	Sacked	26 November 2011	17th	(Iran) Mahmoud Yavari	27 November 2011
Sanat Naft Abadan	(Iran) Gholam Peyrovani	Resigned	27 November 2011	13th	(Portugal) José Alberto Costa	4 December 2011
Persepolis Tehran	(Iran) Hamid Estili	Resigned	9 December 2011	9th	(Turkey) Mustafa Denizli	23 December 2011
Shahrdari Tabriz	(Serbia) Miodrag Ješić	Sacked	24 December 2011	13th	(Iran) Ali Asghar Modir Roosta	5 January 2012
Damash Gilan	(Iran) Ebrahim Ghasempour	Resigned	28 December 2011	7th	(Iran) Mehdi Tartar	6 January 2012
Shahin Bushehr	(Iran) Firouz Karimi	Sacked	5 February 2011	16th	(Iran) Hamid Derakhshan	13 February 2012
Sanat Mes Kerman	(Bosnia and Herzegovina) Miroslav Blažević	Sacked	14 February 2012	14th	(Iran) Ebrahim Ghasempour	16 February 2012
Saipa	(Iran) Majid Saleh	Sacked	15 February 2012	10th	(Iran) Mojtaba Taghavi	1 March 2012

== League table ==
Pos	Team	Pld	W	D	L	GF	GA	GD	Pts	Qualification or relegation
1	Sepahan (C)	34	19	10	5	54	27	+27	67	Qualification for the 2013 AFC Champions League group stage
2	Tractor Sazi	34	19	9	6	57	32	+25	66	Qualification for the 2013 AFC Champions League group stage
3	Esteghlal	34	19	9	6	58	34	+24	66	Qualification for the 2013 AFC Champions League group stage
4	Saba Qom	34	12	14	8	40	38	+2	50	Qualification for the 2013 AFC Champions League qualifying play-off
5	Naft Tehran	34	13	10	11	36	38	−2	49	
6	Zob Ahan	34	9	18	7	29	33	−4	45	
7	Damash	34	11	11	12	34	38	−4	44	
8	Saipa	34	10	13	11	50	39	+11	43	
9	Mes Kerman	34	11	10	13	35	39	−4	43	
10	Sanat Naft	34	11	10	13	49	57	−8	43	
11	Rah Ahan	34	9	15	10	43	42	+1	42	
12	Persepolis	34	10	12	12	50	54	−4	42	
13	Fajr Sepasi	34	10	11	13	31	38	−7	41	
14	Foolad	34	10	10	14	35	37	−2	40	
15	Malavan	34	9	12	13	32	33	−1	39	
16	Sh. Tabriz (R)	34	6	16	12	34	44	−10	34	Relegation to 2012-13 Azadegan League
17	Shahin Bushehr (R)	34	6	15	13	30	43	−13	33	Relegation to 2012-13 Azadegan League
18	Mes Sarcheshmeh (R)	34	5	9	20	23	54	−31	24	Relegation to 2012-13 Azadegan League

Updated to match(es) played on 11 May 2012. Source: varzesh3.com
Rules for classification: 1) points; 2) goal difference; 3) number of goals scored.
(C) Champions; (R) Relegated

== Positions by round ==
Team ╲ Round	1	2	3	4	5	6	7	8	9	10	11	12	13	14	15	16	17	18	19	20	21	22	23	24	25	26	27	28	29	30	31	32	33	34
Sepahan	9	11	7	4	5	7	5	5	5	5	5	5	5	4	5	5	2	3	5	5	3	3	2	1	1	1	1	1	1	1	1	1	1	1
Tractor Sazi	17	7	4	3	2	1	3	4	1	3	4	4	4	5	2	3	4	4	3	2	2	2	3	3	3	3	2	2	3	3	3	2	2	2
Esteghlal	5	4	2	2	1	2	1	1	2	2	1	1	1	1	1	1	1	1	1	1	1	1	1	2	2	2	3	3	2	2	2	3	3	3
Saba Qom	2	3	1	1	3	3	2	2	3	4	3	3	3	3	4	4	5	5	4	4	4	4	4	4	5	4	5	4	4	4	4	4	4	4
Naft Tehran	13	2	9	8	6	4	4	3	4	1	2	2	2	2	3	2	3	2	2	3	5	5	5	5	4	5	4	5	5	5	5	5	5	5
Zob Ahan	3	16	10	5	7	5	7	8	10	6	6	6	8	8	9	9	6	7	9	12	8	10	10	8	8	7	6	6	6	6	6	6	6	6
Damash	11	17	12	12	16	16	16	15	14	12	8	9	7	7	6	7	7	9	10	8	11	11	12	14	11	12	12	13	11	9	8	9	9	7
Saipa	1	1	8	13	9	12	6	9	13	13	12	12	13	14	13	13	10	10	12	10	10	8	7	9	9	10	9	10	10	12	7	8	8	8
Mes Kerman	8	14	16	17	17	18	18	18	17	17	14	14	16	13	14	14	16	15	17	14	14	15	16	13	15	14	13	14	15	14	13	12	11	9
Sanat Naft	14	13	13	9	13	14	9	9	6	7	9	11	9	11	7	6	8	6	7	9	9	7	9	11	12	9	10	9	9	10	11	7	7	10
Rah Ahan	4	8	15	14	11	11	12	13	16	16	16	15	15	16	16	15	14	14	15	16	15	16	13	12	13	15	15	15	14	13	15	15	14	11
Persepolis	7	15	17	15	12	13	15	10	7	10	11	7	10	6	8	8	9	11	8	7	7	9	8	7	7	8	8	8	8	7	9	11	15	12
Fajr Sepasi	15	12	14	16	14	8	10	11	15	15	17	17	17	17	17	16	15	17	16	17	16	12	14	15	14	11	14	12	12	11	12	13	12	13
Foolad	12	6	3	6	10	9	11	12	8	11	13	13	11	12	12	10	11	8	6	6	6	6	6	6	6	6	7	7	7	8	10	10	10	14
Malavan	6	10	5	7	8	10	13	16	12	14	15	16	14	15	15	17	17	16	13	13	13	13	11	10	10	13	11	11	13	15	14	14	13	15
Sh. Tabriz	10	9	6	11	15	15	14	14	11	8	10	10	12	9	11	12	13	13	11	11	12	14	17	17	17	17	17	17	17	17	16	16	16	16
Shahin Bushehr	16	5	11	10	4	6	8	6	9	9	7	8	6	10	10	11	12	12	14	15	17	17	15	16	16	16	16	16	16	16	17	17	17	17
Mes Sarcheshmeh	18	18	18	18	18	17	17	17	18	18	18	18	18	18	18	18	18	18	18	18	18	18	18	18	18	18	18	18	18	18	18	18	18	18

Leader
AFC Champions League 2013 Qualifying play-off
Relegation to 2012–13 Azadegan League

Source: Cups.ir (in Persian)

== Results ==
Home \ Away	DMG	EST	FJR	FOL	MLV	MES	MSA	NAF	PRS	RAH	SAB	SAP	SNA	SEP	SHB	SHT	TRK	ZOB
Damash		0–1	1–0	3–2	0–0	1–1	2–1	1–3	2–3	3–1	0–0	0–3	0–0	0–1	0–0	2–1	2–3	1–1
Esteghlal	1–0		2–0	2–1	1–0	0–1	1–0	3–0	2–3	1–1	3–0	1–0	1–2	1–1	3–2	0–0	2–3	2–2
Fajr Sepasi	0–1	2–1		2–1	2–0	1–0	3–3	0–0	1–2	1–2	0–0	1–1	2–0	3–2	1–0	2–1	1–2	0–0
Foolad	1–1	1–4	1–0		1–0	0–1	4–0	2–1	1–2	0–0	3–0	1–2	2–0	1–2	0–0	0–0	2–1	0–1
Malavan	0–1	4–2	2–0	2–0		0–0	4–0	0–1	2–0	0–0	1–0	1–1	1–2	3–4	0–0	1–0	0–0	3–3
Mes Kerman	2–2	1–2	1–2	1–1	1–0		4–1	0–1	1–0	0–0	0–0	1–0	2–2	3–0	3–2	1–1	1–0	2–0
Mes Sarcheshmeh	0–4	1–3	1–0	0–1	0–0	2–0		1–2	2–2	2–1	0–1	0–0	2–1	0–2	1–0	1–2	0–0	0–0
Naft Tehran	1–0	0–2	1–0	1–3	3–1	3–2	1–0		0–3	2–2	2–2	2–0	1–3	0–1	2–1	0–0	1–1	0–1
Persepolis	0–3	0–2	2–3	1–1	1–1	1–1	2–1	0–0		3–4	2–0	2–4	3–1	0–0	4–1	1–2	0–1	0–0
Rah Ahan	0–1	2–2	1–1	0–0	0–1	2–0	3–1	2–1	1–1		0–2	2–2	0–2	1–1	4–1	2–0	0–1	2–2
Saba Qom	0–1	1–1	1–1	1–0	1–0	1–1	3–1	0–0	2–2	2–1		3–0	2–2	0–0	1–1	3–1	2–2	0–1
Saipa	3–0	2–2	5–0	0–0	1–1	4–2	3–1	0–0	0–1	0–1	0–0		2–2	0–4	3–0	1–2	0–1	0–1
Sanat Naft	2–0	1–2	1–1	2–2	1–2	1–0	2–0	2–1	4–2	2–1	2–3	0–4		0–4	1–1	0–2	3–3	1–1
Sepahan	3–0	1–1	1–0	2–0	3–2	4–0	0–0	0–1	1–1	3–2	1–2	2–1	2–1		2–0	1–0	2–1	1–1
Shahin Bushehr	1–1	1–1	1–0	1–2	0–0	1–0	1–0	1–0	2–1	0–0	4–0	2–2	1–1	1–1		2–2	0–3	1–1
Sh. Tabriz	0–0	1–2	0–0	1–1	2–0	0–1	1–1	2–2	2–2	2–2	1–3	1–1	2–1	0–2	1–1		0–1	0–0
Tractor Sazi	3–1	0–2	0–0	2–0	2–0	3–1	0–0	1–2	4–1	1–1	2–3	2–2	4–1	1–0	1–0	5–1		2–1
Zob Ahan	0–0	0–2	1–1	1–0	0–0	1–0	1–0	1–1	2–2	0–2	2–1	0–3	1–3	0–0	1–0	2–2	0–1	

Updated to match(es) played on 11 May 2012. Source: IPL Stats
Legend: Blue = home team win; Yellow = draw; Red = away team win.

== Clubs season-progress ==
Team ╲ Round	1	2	3	4	5	6	7	8	9	10	11	12	13	14	15	16	17	18	19	20	21	22	23	24	25	26	27	28	29	30	31	32	33	34
Sepahan	D	D	W	W	L	L	W	L	W	W	D	W	D	W	D	D	W	D	L	W	W	W	W	W	W	W	L	W	W	D	W	W	D	D
Tractor Sazi	L	W	W	W	W	W	L	D	W	L	D	W	L	D	W	D	D	D	W	W	W	W	L	D	W	L	W	W	D	W	W	W	D	W
Esteghlal	D	W	W	W	W	L	W	W	L	D	W	W	D	W	W	L	W	D	W	L	L	W	W	L	D	W	D	D	W	W	D	D	W	W
Saba Qom	W	D	W	W	L	W	W	W	L	L	W	W	D	D	L	D	D	D	W	W	D	D	L	W	L	D	L	W	D	L	D	D	D	D
Naft Tehran	D	W	L	D	W	W	W	W	D	W	D	W	D	D	L	W	L	W	W	L	L	L	D	D	W	L	W	L	L	D	D	L	W	L
Zob Ahan	D	L	W	W	D	D	D	W	D	W	L	D	L	D	D	D	W	L	L	L	W	D	D	W	D	W	W	D	D	D	D	D	D	L
Damash	D	L	W	L	L	D	L	W	D	W	W	L	W	D	W	L	D	L	L	W	L	L	D	L	W	D	D	D	W	W	D	D	L	W
Saipa	W	D	L	L	W	L	W	L	L	D	D	D	D	L	D	W	W	D	L	W	D	W	D	L	D	L	W	L	W	L	W	D	D	D
Mes Kerman	D	L	L	L	L	D	L	W	L	W	W	D	L	W	L	D	L	W	L	W	D	L	D	W	L	W	D	D	L	W	D	W	D	W
Sanat Naft	D	D	L	W	L	D	W	D	W	D	L	L	W	L	W	W	L	W	L	L	D	W	L	L	L	W	D	W	D	D	L	W	L	D
Rah Ahan	D	D	L	D	W	D	D	L	L	D	D	D	D	D	D	D	D	W	L	L	W	L	W	W	L	L	D	L	W	W	L	D	W	W
Persepolis	D	L	L	D	W	D	L	W	W	L	D	W	D	W	L	D	D	L	W	D	W	L	D	W	L	D	D	W	L	D	L	L	L	W
Fajr Sepasi	D	D	L	L	W	W	D	L	L	D	L	L	L	D	D	W	D	L	W	L	W	W	L	L	W	W	L	W	D	W	L	D	D	D
Foolad	D	W	W	L	L	D	D	L	W	L	L	D	W	L	D	W	D	W	W	W	L	L	W	D	W	L	D	D	L	L	L	D	L	L
Malavan	D	D	W	D	D	L	L	L	W	L	L	L	W	L	D	L	D	W	W	D	D	D	W	W	L	L	W	D	L	L	D	D	W	L
Sh. Tabriz	D	D	W	L	L	D	D	D	W	W	L	D	D	W	L	L	D	L	W	D	L	L	L	D	D	D	L	L	D	D	W	D	D	L
Shahin Bushehr	D	W	L	D	W	L	D	D	D	D	W	L	W	L	D	L	D	L	L	L	D	D	W	L	D	D	D	L	W	L	D	L	D	L
Mes Sarcheshmeh	L	L	L	D	L	W	L	L	L	L	W	L	L	D	W	D	L	D	L	D	L	W	L	L	D	D	L	L	L	L	W	L	D	D

Source: IPL Stats
W = Win; D = Draw; L = Lose

== Statistics ==
=== Top Goalscorers ===
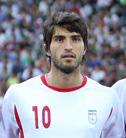
Karim Ansarifard

Position	Player	Club	Goals
1	(Iran) Karim Ansarifard	Saipa	21
2	(Mali) Founéké Sy	Sanat Naft	20
3	(Iran) Reza Enayati	Saba Qom	18
4	(Iran) Ali Karimi	Persepolis	11
5	(Iran) Saeed Daghighi	Shahrdari Tabriz	10
5	(Iran) Mojtaba Jabbari	Esteghlal	10
5	(Iran) Reza Norouzi	Foolad	10
5	(Portugal) Flávio Paixão	Tractor Sazi	10
5	(Iran) Mehdi Rajabzadeh	Fajr Sepasi	10
10	(Iran) Bahador Abdi	Rah Ahan	9
10	(Iran) Omid Alishah	Rah Ahan	9
10	(Iran) Farhad Majidi	Esteghlal	9
10	(Iraq) Emad Mohammed Ridha	Sepahan	9
14	9 players		8
23	7 players		7
30	7 players		6
37	13 players		5
50	16 player		4
66	24 player		3
90	45 player		2
135	92 player		1
_	13 players ^{1}		OG
_	technical loses of 3–0		1
Total goals (Including technical loses)			720
Total games			306
Average per game			2.35

^{1} Siamak Kouroshi from Naft Tehran 2 owne goals.
Last updated: 16 May 2012
Source: IPL Stats

=== Cards ===
Position	Player	Club	Yellow card	Yellow card Red card	Red card	Total
1	(Brazil) Márcio José	Naft Tehran	10	1	0	11
2	(Iran) Majid Gholamnejad	Saipa	10	0	0	10
2	(Iran) Hossein Kaabi	Rah Ahan	9	0	1	10
2	(Iran) Ali Samereh	Mes Sarcheshmeh	8	2	0	10
5	(Iran) Siavash Akbarpour	Tractor Sazi	9	0	0	9
5	(Iran) Mohammad Ebrahimi	Tractor Sazi	9	0	0	9
5	(Iran) Amir Mohammadi	Mes Sarcheshmeh	9	0	0	9
5	(Iran) Andranik Teymourian	Esteghlal	8	0	1	9
5	(Iran) Maziar Zare	Persepolis	8	1	0	9
10	8 player		-	-	-	8
18	13 player		-	-	-	7
31	25 player		-	-	-	6
56	46 player		-	-	-	5
102	38 player		-	-	-	4
140	63 player		-	-	-	3
203	60 player		-	-	-	2
263	86 player		-	-	-	1
Total Cards			1101	34	33	1168

Last updated: 16 May 2012
Source: IPL stats

=== Matches played ===
Position	Player	Club	Appearance
1	(Iran) Abouzar Rahimi	Damash Gilan	33
1	(Iran) Mehdi Rahmati	Esteghlal	33
3	(Iran) Rahman Ahmadi	Sepahan	32
3	(Iran) Morteza Asadi	Tractor Sazi	32
3	(Iran) Omid Ebrahimi	Sepahan	32
3	(Iran) Pirouz Ghorbani	Saipa	32
3	(Iran) Hanif Omranzadeh	Esteghlal	32
3	(Iran) Alireza Ramezani	Malavan	32

Last updated: 16 May 2012
Source: IPL stats

=== Hat-tricks ===
Player	For	Against	Result	Date
(Iran) Javad Kazemian	Persepolis	Sanat Naft Abadan	3–1	23 August 2011
(Iran) Jalal Rafkhaei	Malavan	Zob Ahan	3–3	1 September 2011
(Iran) Iman Mousavi	Naft Tehran	Malavan	3–1	25 September 2011
(Iran) Mojtaba Jabbari	Esteghlal	Shahin Bushehr	3–2	24 November 2011
(Iran) Reza Norouzi	Foolad	Naft Tehran	3–1	15 January 2012
(Mali) Founéké Sy	Sanat Naft	Persepolis	4–2	25 January 2012
(Libya) Éamon Zayed	Persepolis	Esteghlal	3–2	2 February 2012
(Iran) Karim Ansarifard	Saipa	Fajr Sepasi	5–0	9 March 2012
(Brazil) Bruno Correa	Sepahan	Rah Ahan	3–2	17 March 2012
(Iran) Bahador Abdi	Rah Ahan	Persepolis	4–3	6 May 2012
(Libya) Éamon Zayed	Persepolis	Rah Ahan	3–4	6 May 2012

==== Fastest hat-trick of the season ====
(Libya) Éamon Zayed for Persepolis against Esteghlal, 9 minutes (2 February 2012)

=== Scoring ===
- First goal of the season: Hossein Kazemi own goal for Zob Ahan against Rah Ahan (2 August 2011)
- Fastest goal of the season: 10 seconds – Pejman Shahpari for Saba against Foolad (16 October 2011)
- Widest winning margin: 5 goals
  - Saipa 5–0 Fajr Sepasi (9 March 2012)
- Highest scoring game: 7 goals
  - Malavan 3–4 Sepahan (16 April 2012)
  - Persepolis 3–4 Rah Ahan (6 May 2012)
- Most goals scored in a match by a single team: 5 goals
  - Tractor Sazi 5–1 Shahrdari Tabriz (25 September 2011)
  - Saipa 5–0 Fajr Sepasi (9 March 2012)
- Most goals scored in a match by a losing team: 3 goals
  - Malavan 3–4 Sepahan (16 April 2012)
  - Persepolis 3–4 Rah Ahan (6 May 2012)

== Awards ==
=== Monthly awards ===
Month	Manager of the Month		Player of the Month	
Month	Manager	Club	Player	Club
August	(Iran) Abdollah Veisi	Saba Qom	(Iran) Karim Ansarifard	Saipa
September	(Iran) Hossein Faraki	Naft Tehran	(Iran) Iman Mousavi	Naft Tehran
October	(Iran) Parviz Mazloomi	Esteghlal	(Serbia) Ivan Petrović	Shahin Bushehr
November	(Iran) Ebrahim Ghasempour	Damash Gilan	(Iran) Omid Alishah	Rah Ahan
December	(Iran) Majid Saleh	Saipa	(Mali) Founéké Sy	Sanat Naft
January	(Croatia) Zlatko Kranjčar	Sepahan	(Trinidad and Tobago) Jlloyd Samuel	Esteghlal
February	(Turkey) Mustafa Denizli	Persepolis	(Iran) Reza Enayati	Saba Qom
March	(Iran) Amir Ghalenoei	Tractor Sazi	(Brazil) Bruno Correa	Sepahan
April	(Croatia) Zlatko Kranjčar	Sepahan	(Portugal) Flávio Paixão	Tractor Sazi

=== Annual awards ===
==== Team of the Season ====
Goalkeeper: Rahman Ahmadi (Sepahan)
Defence: Ehsan Hajsafi (Tractor Sazi), Pejman Montazeri (Esteghlal), Jalal Hosseini (Sepahan), Hossein Mahini (Zob Ahan)
Midfield: Ali Karimi (Persepolis), Omid Ebrahimi (Sepahan), Mojtaba Jabbari (Esteghlal), Flávio Paixão (Tractor Sazi)
Attack: Founéké Sy (Sanat Naft), Karim Ansarifard (Saipa)

==== Player of the Season ====
Goal.com selected Farhad Majidi as the best player of the first half of the season and Ali Karimi as the best player of the second half. Karim Ansarifard and Omid Alishah also won the best young players of the tournament.

== Attendances ==
=== Average home attendances ===
Pos	Team	Total	High	Low	Average	Change
1	Tractor Sazi	593,000	80,000	0	39,533	−5.9%
2	Esteghlal	540,000	85,000	5,000	31,765	+26.5%
3	Persepolis	480,000	100,000	2,000	28,235	+20.1%
4	Sanat Naft	167,000	15,000	3,000	9,824	−30.5%
5	Damash	130,000	15,000	0	8,125	+204.6%
6	Shahin Bushehr	125,000	20,000	0	7,813	−35.2%
7	Fajr Sepasi	130,000	20,000	2,000	7,647	+257.7%
8	Mes Kerman	100,000	15,000	1,000	5,882	+12.4%
8	Sepahan	100,000	15,000	1,000	5,882	+8.7%
10	Malavan	83,000	10,000	2,000	5,188	−32.2%
11	Sh. Tabriz	81,000	16,000	1,000	4,765	−37.5%
12	Foolad	79,000	15,000	1,000	4,647	−14.1%
13	Saba Qom	61,000	15,000	1,000	3,588	+52.5%
14	Zob Ahan	48,000	10,000	1,000	2,824	−17.2%
15	Rah Ahan	38,000	7,000	1,000	2,235	−38.7%
16	Saipa	37,000	5,000	1,000	2,176	−33.9%
17	Naft Tehran	35,000	10,000	1,000	2,059	−25.5%
18	Mes Sarcheshmeh	29,000	7,000	1,000	1,706	+146.5%
	League total	2,856,000	100,000	0	9,488	+1.1%

Updated to games played on 11 May 2012
Source: iplstats.com
Notes:
Matches with spectator bans are not included in average attendances
Damash, Fajr Sepasi and Mes Sarcheshmeh played last season in Azadegan League

=== Highest attendances ===
Rank	Home team	Score	Away team	Attendance	Date	Week	Stadium
1	Persepolis	0–2	Esteghlal	100,000	16 September 2011	7	Azadi
2	Esteghlal	2–3	Tractor Sazi	85,000	9 September 2011	6	Azadi
3	Tractor Sazi	0–2	Esteghlal	80,000	29 January 2012	23	Sahand
3	Esteghlal	2–3	Persepolis	80,000	2 February 2012	24	Azadi
3	Tractor Sazi	0–0	Fajr Sepasi	80,000	6 April 2012	29	Sahand
6	Esteghlal	2–0	Fajr Sepasi	75,000	17 August 2011	4	Azadi
7	Esteghlal	1–0	Damash	70,000	8 August 2011	2	Azadi
7	Persepolis	1–2	Shahrdari Tabriz	70,000	11 August 2011	3	Azadi
9	Persepolis	1–1	Malavan	65,000	2 August 2011	1	Azadi
10	Persepolis	3–1	Sanat Naft	60,000	24 August 2011	5	Azadi

Notes:
Updated to games played on 11 May 2012. Source: iplstats.com

== See also ==
- 2011–12 Azadegan League
- 2011–12 Iran Football's 2nd Division
- 2011–12 Iran Football's 3rd Division
- 2011–12 Hazfi Cup
- Iranian Super Cup
- 2011–12 Iranian Futsal Super League

Team season articles

- 2011–12 Zob Ahan
- 2011–12 Persepolis
- 2011–12 Rah Ahan
- 2011–12 Esteghlal
- 2011–12 Tractor Sazi
- 2011–12 Sepahan
