= Mojtaba Shiri =

Mojtaba Shiri may refer to:

- Mojtaba Shiri (footballer born 1979), Iranian football defender who plays for Sanat Naft
- Mojtaba Shiri (footballer born 1990), Iranian football striker who plays for Rah Ahan
