= Mostafa Musallami =

Iranian footballer

Personal information
- Full name: Mostafa Musallami
- Date of birth: January 1, 1950 (age 76)
- Place of birth: Iran
- Position: Defender

Senior career*
Years	Team	Apps	(Gls)
1975–1976	Bargh Shiraz		
1976–1979	Taj		
1979–1981	Esteghlal		

International career
1977	Iran	2	(0)
- * Club domestic league appearances and goals

Mostafa Musallami or Mosttafa Mosallami (Persian: مصطفی مسلمی; born January 1, 1950) is an Iranian former footballer who played as a defender for the Taj SC.
