= Sattar Zare =

Iranian football player and coach

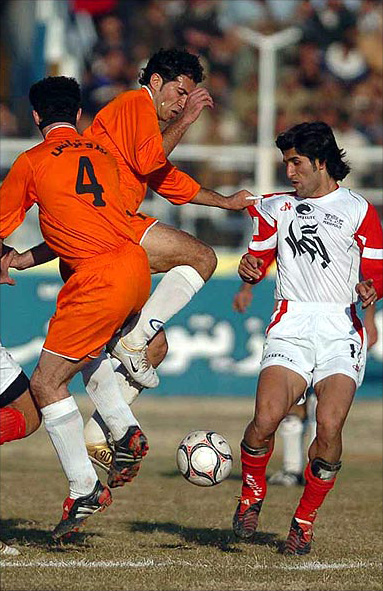
- Sattar Zare (center) in 2005

Personal information
- Full name: Sattar Zare
- Date of birth: 27 January 1982 (age 44)
- Place of birth: Shiraz, Iran
- Height: 1.87 m (6 ft 2 in)
- Positions: Wing-back; midfielder

Youth career
- 1990–2002: Bargh Shiraz

Senior career*
Years	Team	Apps	(Gls)
2002–2010	Bargh Shiraz	186	(24)
2010–2011	Shahin Bushehr	32	(2)
2011–2012	Rah Ahan	9	(0)
2012	Shahin Bushehr	8	(0)
2012–2013	Bargh Shiraz	4	(0)
Total		239	(26)

International career^{‡}
2003	Iran U–23		
2005	Iran B	6	(0)
2003–2009	Iran	36	(0)

Managerial career
- 2014–2017: Bargh Shiraz
Medal record
Representing Iran
Islamic Solidarity Games
Bronze medal – third place	2005 Saudi Arabia	Team competition
- * Club domestic league appearances and goals as of 6 January 2012 ‡ National team caps and goals as of 10 October 2026

Sattar Zare (Persian: ستار زارع, born 27 January 1982) is an Iranian football coach and former player who currently manages Bargh Shiraz. He played both the wing-back and midfield positions.

== Club career ==
Zare started his youth career at Bargh Shiraz at the age of 8 and stayed with the youth team until he was 20 and played for the team after becoming influential in the club's relative success in recent years. He is the captain of Bargh and the only Bargh player that participates in Team melli in recent years. In the middle of 2007–08 season, he was fired and banned from training by the team manager Mahmoud Yavari because of anarchy, but he was forgiven after a brief period and played for the club again. at the end of 2007–08 season, he was a free agent and had offers from both Iranian giants Persepolis and Esteghlal, and also an offer from Mes, but he decided to remain at Hafezieh for another season. He was the best player for Bargh Shiraz but the team was relegated and despite having offers again he decided to stay.

He joined Shahin Bushehr in July 2010 and spent one season there. After the end of the season, he signed a contract with Rah Ahan on 1 July 2011 but he was fired by Rah Ahan's head coach, Ali Daei on 5 October 2011. He returned to Shahin Bushehr during the winter transfer window.

=== Club career statistics ===
As of 26 September 2012

Club performance			League		Cup		Continental		Total	
Season	Club	League	Apps	Goals	Apps	Goals	Apps	Goals	Apps	Goals
Iran			League		Hazfi Cup		Asia		Total	
2002–03	Bargh	Pro League	23	3			–			
2003–04	Bargh	Pro League	21	0			–			
2004–05	Bargh	Pro League	25	1			–			
2005–06	Bargh	Pro League	27	1			–			
2006–07	Bargh	Pro League	11	3			–			
2007–08	Bargh	Pro League	23	2	2	0	–		25	2
2008–09	Bargh	Pro League	31	8			–			
2009–10	Bargh	Division 1	25	6			–			
2010–11	Shahin	Pro League	32	2	1	0	–		33	1
2011–12	Rah Ahan	Pro League	9	0	1	0	–		10	0
2011–12	Shahin	Pro League	8	0	0	0	–		7	0
2012–13	Bargh	Division 1	4	0			–		4	0
Career total							0	0		

- Assist Goals

Season	Team	Assists
05–06	Bargh	5
06–07	Bargh	2
07–08	Bargh	2
08–09	Bargh	2
10–11	Shahin	3
11–12	Rah Ahan	1
11–12	Shahin	1

== International career ==
He was a little-known player beyond the Hafezieh Stadium in his native city of Shiraz, until his selection for the Iranian national under-23 football team.

Zare was drafted to mend the defenses of the Iranian U-23s, after Hossein Faraki took over the coaching job. Along with Zare, Faraki also invited Alavi and the duo were a success. After that performance, Iran's coach Branko Ivankovic invited both of the players to the squad for the game against Jordan in June 2004. He made his debut on 20 July 2004 in the match against Thailand. He was a part of Iran's 2004 Asian Cup squad. During the quarterfinals against China he received a controversial red card after lightly pushing a Chinese player's chest who fell over holding his face.

Zare was set to play for Iran at the 2006 World Cup, but after damaging ligaments in his right knee, he was replaced by Moharram Navidkia. After missing the World Cup, he was not a regular part of Team Melli. After the World Cup, Amir Ghalenoei became Iran's coach. Ghalenoei called up Zare for his 30-man list for the 2007 AFC Asian Cup, but he did not select him for the Iranian squad. When Ali Daei became Team Melli's coach, he called Zare i[ again and used him as a left defender in starting line up in the World Cup 2010 first round qualifications.

== Honours ==
=== Club ===
- Hazfi Cup
  - Runner up:
    - 2011–12 with Shahin Bushehr
