= Pars Shiraz Stadium =

Multi-use stadium in Shiraz, Iran

Pars Stadium
- Mianrood Stadium
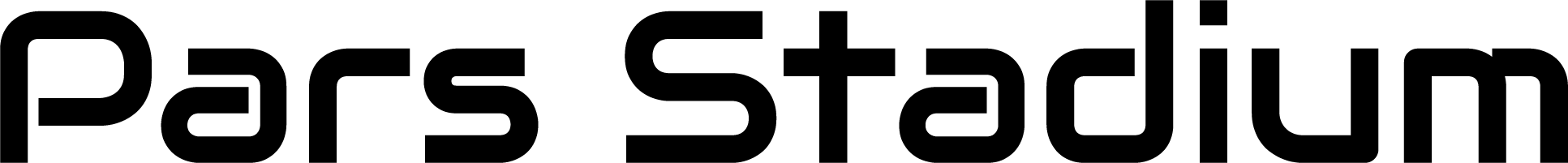

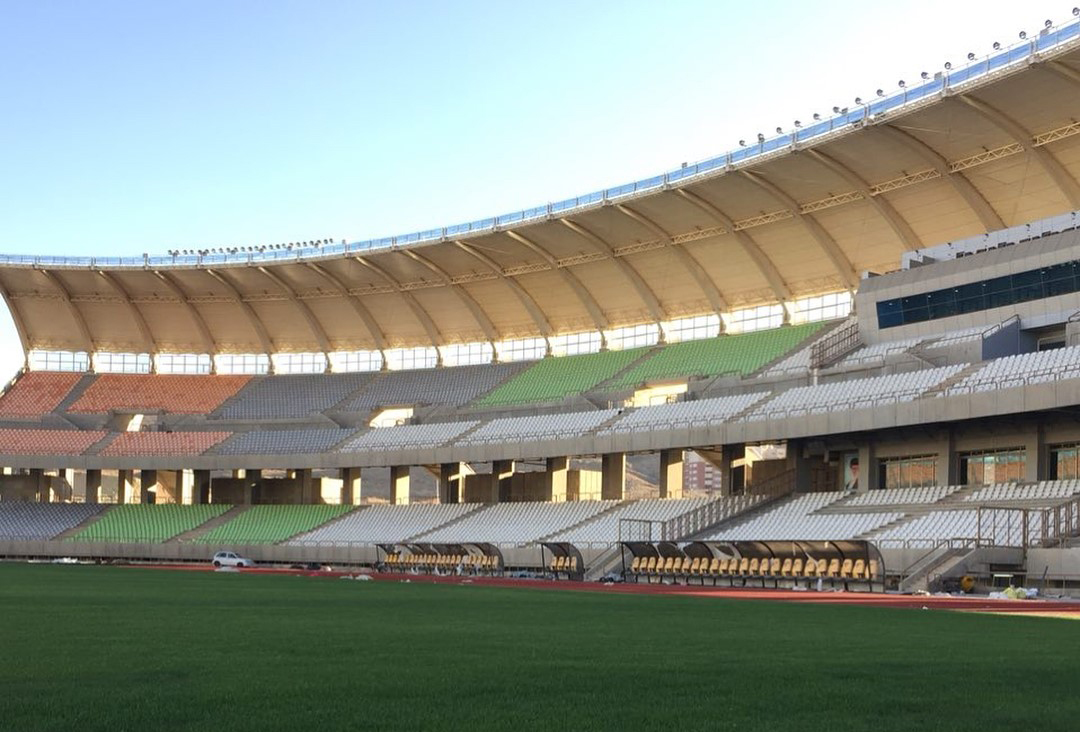
- Interactive map of Pars Stadium
- Full name: Pars Stadium
- Former names: Shiraz Olympic Stadium
- Location: Mianrood, Shiraz, Iran
- Coordinates: 29°33′54″N 52°29′29″E
- Owner: Ministry of Sport and Youth (Iran)
- Capacity: 50,000 (Football)
- Surface: Grass

Construction
- Groundbreaking: 1995
- Built: 1995–2017
- Opened: April 20, 2017
- Structural engineer: Hamgrooh Consulting Engineers

Tenant
- Fajr Sepasi

The Pars Stadium (Persian: ورزشگاه پارس Varzešgâh-è Pârs, lit. 'Persia Stadium') is a multi-purpose stadium in Mianrood, southern Shiraz, Iran. It is mostly used for football matches. The stadium holds an all-seater capacity for 50,000 people. The stadium is the fourth largest stadium in Iran. It is currently used mostly for football matches and is the home stadium of Persian Gulf League side, Fajr Sepasi F.C. The stadium also is used for some matches of Bargh Shiraz F.C. and Qashqai F.C. in Azadegan League.

== History ==
The original construction of the stadium started in 1995. In 2007, it was re-started ant took until 2017. The stadium was finally opened on April 20, 2017, by Masoud Soltanifar, the Minister of Youth Affairs and Sports.

== Transport ==
The stadium is located on the southwestern outskirts of Shiraz, 13.4 kilometres (8.3 mi) away from the city center. It is served by Line 2 of the Shiraz Metro, accessible via Ghahramanan Station.
