= Alireza Abbasfard =

Iranian footballer

Personal information
- Full name: Alireza Abbasfard
- Date of birth: 29 September 1981 (age 45)
- Place of birth: Shiraz, Iran
- Height: 1.90 m (6 ft 3 in)
- Position: Centre forward

Team information
- Current team: Naft va Gaz Gachsaran

Senior career*
Years	Team	Apps	(Gls)
2001–2004	Bargh Shiraz	?	(13)
2004–2006	Saipa	48	(10)
2006–2009	Saba Battery	47	(5)
2008–2009	→ Esteghlal (loan)	18	(4)
2009–2011	Paykan	38	(11)
2011–2013	Rah Ahan	48	(8)
2013–2014	Sarawak FA	3	(0)
2015	Naft va Gaz Gachsaran		

International career
2008–2012	Iran	3	(1)
- * Club domestic league appearances and goals

Alireza Abbasfard (Persian: علیرضا عباسفرد) (born 29 September 1981) is an Iranian footballer who currently plays for Naft va Gaz Gachsaran in the Iran 2nd division football league. He previously played for Rah Ahan and Esteghlal. He usually plays in centre forward position.

== Club career ==
He joined Rah Ahan in 2011 under Ali Daei management. In last days of 2013 he joined Malaysian Super League side Sarawak and being first Iranian to play in Malaysian League.

=== Club career statistics ===
Last Update 24 Feb 2014

Club performance			League		Cup		Continental		Total	
Season	Club	League	Apps	Goals	Apps	Goals	Apps	Goals	Apps	Goals
Iran			League		Hazfi Cup		Asia		Total	
2004–05	Saipa	Pro League	23	5			-	-		
2005–06	Saipa	Pro League	25	5			-	-		
2006–07	Saba	Pro League	21	2			-	-		
2007–08	Saba	Pro League	26	3			-	-		
2008–09	Esteghlal	Pro League	18	4		0	3	0		4
2009–10	Paykan	Pro League	12	4			-	-		
2010–11	Paykan	Pro League	26	7	1	0	-	-	28	7
2011–12	Rah Ahan	Pro League	31	5	0	0	-	-	31	5
2012–13	Rah Ahan	Pro League	17	3	0	0	-	-	17	3
Malaysia			League		FA Cup		Asia		Total	
2014	Sarawak	Super League	3	0	4	1	-	-	7	1
Career total			180	51			3	0		

- Assist Goals

Season	Team	Assists
05–06	Saipa	2
06–07	Saba	2
08–09	Esteghlal	2
09–10	Paykan	2
10–11	Paykan	1
11–12	Rah Ahan	5

== International career ==
Scores and results list Iran's goal tally first.

#	Date	Venue	Opponent	Score	Result	Competition
1	6 November 2012	Azadi Stadium	Tajikistan	6–1	6–1	Friendly

== Honours ==
- Iran's Premier Football League
  - Winner: 1
    - 2008–09 with Esteghlal
