= List of Pegah F.C. seasons =

== Seasons ==
The table below chronicles the achievements of Pegah Gilan every season, from 2002 to 2008.

| Season | League | | | | | | | | | Hazfi Cup | Leagues Top goalscorer | | Manager(s) |
| Season | Division | P | W | D | L | F | A | Pts | Pos | Hazfi Cup | Name(s) | Goals | Manager(s) |
|---|---|---|---|---|---|---|---|---|---|---|---|---|---|
| 2002–03 | Div 1 | 30 | 15 | 8 | 7 | 37 | 22 | 53 | 2nd | | | | Sharafi/ Jahanpour |
| 2003–04 | IPL | 26 | 8 | 6 | 12 | 27 | 42 | 30 | 9th | 1/8 Final | Pejman Noori | 8 | Jahanpour/ Ješić |
| 2004–05 | IPL | 30 | 3 | 11 | 16 | 17 | 45 | 20 | 16th | 1/8 Final | Salamibakhsh & Yazdani & Chavoshi | 3 | Ješić/ Abtahi/ Sharafi/ Krauss |
| 2005–06 | Div 1 | 22 | 15 | 3 | 4 | 42 | 12 | 48 | 1st | | Hadi Norouzi | 13 | Begović |
| 2006–07 | Div 1 | 21 | 11 | 6 | 4 | 22 | 6 | 39 | 1st | First Round | Amin Mohtashami | 8 | Jahanpour |
| 2007–08 | IPL | 34 | 9 | 11 | 14 | 26 | 35 | 38 | 15th | Final | Hossein Ebrahimi | 5 | Jahanpour/ Dražić/ Dastneshan |

=== Key ===
- P = Played
- W = Games won
- D = Games drawn
- L = Games lost
- F = Goals for
- A = Goals against
- Pts = Points
- Pos = Final position
- IPL = Iran Pro League
- Div 1 = Azadegan League

| Runners-up | Promoted | Relegated |

== See also ==
- Pegah F.C.
- Damash Gilan
- Azadegan League
- Iran Pro League
- Hazfi Cup
