= Babak Pourgholami =

Iranian footballer

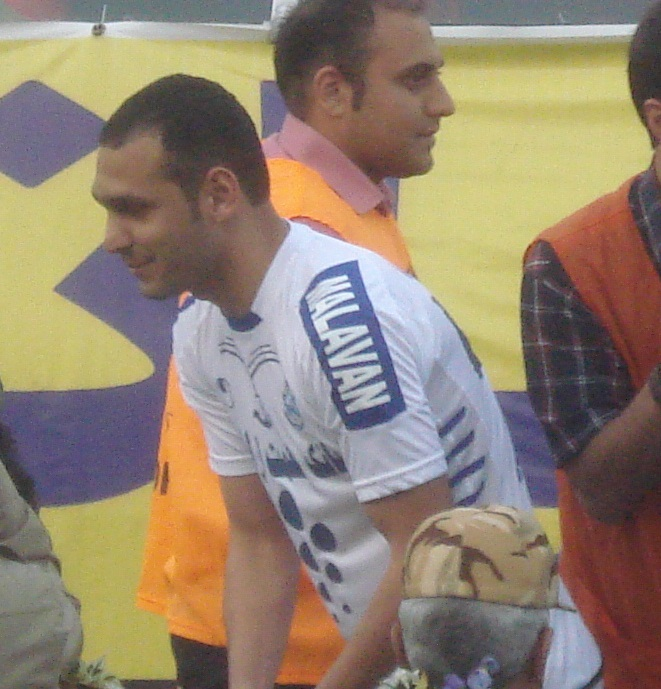

Personal information
- Full name: Babak Pourgholami
- Date of birth: May 7, 1981 (age 45)
- Place of birth: Bandar Anzali, Iran
- Position: Midfielder

Team information
- Current team: Aluminium

Youth career
- 1999–2001: Malavan

Senior career*
Years	Team	Apps	(Gls)
2001–2004	Malavan	37	(1)
2004–2007	Fajr Sepasi	51	(0)
2007–2013	Malavan	140	(1)
2013–2016	Aluminium	47	(0)
- * Club domestic league appearances and goals as of 15 May 2015

Babak Pourgholami is an Iranian football player who plays for Aluminium in Azadegan League.

== Club career ==
=== Club career statistics ===
- Last updated: 30 April 2013

Club performance			League		Cup		Total	
Season	Club	League	Apps	Goals	Apps	Goals	Apps	Goals
Iran			League		Hazfi Cup		Total	
2004–05	Fajr Sepasi	Pro League	16	0				
2005–06	Fajr Sepasi	Pro League	28	0				
2006–07	Fajr Sepasi	Pro League	23	0				
2007–08	Malavan	Pro League	14	0	1	0	15	0
2008–09	Malavan	Pro League	28	0	2	0	30	0
2009–10	Malavan	Pro League	29	1	2	0	31	1
2010–11	Malavan	Pro League	17	0	4	0	21	0
2011–12	Malavan	Pro League	27	0	0	0	27	0
2012–13	Malavan	Pro League	25	0	1	0	26	0
Career total			191	1				

- Assist Goals

Season	Team	Assists
09/10	Malavan	2
10/11	Malavan	0
11/12	Malavan	0
