= 1991–92 Iran 2nd Division =

Iran Football's 2nd Division
- Season: 1991 to 92
- Champions: Bargh Shiraz
- Promoted: Bargh Shiraz; Shahrdari Sari F.C.; Shahrdari Sari
- Relegated: Dokhaniyat Varamin F.C.; Dokhaniyat Varamin n; Esteghlal Hamedan

The 1991–92 Iran 2nd Division football season was played in a single group with ten teams competing. The top two teams – Bargh Shiraz and Shahrdari Sari – gained promotion to the Azadegan League, which was at that time the top-level football league in Iran.

== Standings ==
Pos	Team	Pld	W	D	L	GF	GA	GD	Pts	Promotion or relegation
1	Bargh Shiraz	22	11	8	3	25	11	+14	30	Promoted 1992–93 Azadegan League
2	Shahrdari Sari	22	10	9	3	33	16	+17	29	Promoted 1992–93 Azadegan League
3	Sepidrood	22	9	11	2	31	15	+16	29	Promoted 1992–93 Azadegan League
4	Bank Saderat Kermanshah	22	11	5	6	30	20	+10	27	
5	Gosht Esfahan	22	8	8	6	26	18	+8	24	
6	Iranjavan	22	7	10	5	25	18	+7	24	
7	Payam Azadegan Mashhad	22	7	9	6	20	16	+4	23	
8	Kheybar Khorramabad	22	5	9	8	13	19	−6	19	
9	Shahrdari Kerman	22	5	9	8	16	25	−9	19	
10	Idem Tabriz	22	5	8	9	24	33	−9	18	
11	Esteghlal Hamedan	22	6	5	11	24	33	−9	17	Relegated to 3rd Division
12	Dokhaniyat Varamin	22	0	5	17	20	64	−44	5	Relegated to 3rd Division
