= Hamed Noormohammadi =

Iranian footballer (born 1986)

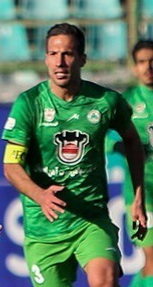

Personal information
- Full name: Hamed Noormohammadi
- Date of birth: May 22, 1986 (age 40)
- Place of birth: Tehran. Iran
- Height: 1.88 m (6 ft 2 in)
- Position: Defender

Team information
- Current team: Zob Ahan Esfahan
- Number: 3

Youth career
- 2005–2008: Rah Ahan

Senior career*
Years	Team	Apps	(Gls)
2005–2015	Rah Ahan	124	(4)
2015–2017	Malavan	21	(1)
2017–2019	Pars Jonoubi	41	(1)
2019–2020	Naft Masjed Soleyman	27	(3)
2020–2021	Mes Rafsanjan	19	(0)
2021–2023	Zob Ahan Esfahan	50	(0)
2023-	Malavan F.C.	43	(1)
- * Club domestic league appearances and goals as of 26 February 2024 @ 17:14(AEST)

Hamed Noormohammadi (born May 22, 1986) is an Iranian football player who currently plays for Zob Ahan Esfahan in the Persian Gulf Pro League.

== Club career ==
Noormohammadi has played his entire career for Rah Ahan.

=== Club career statistics ===
Last Update 21 January 2016

Club performance			League		Cup		Continental		Total	
Season	Club	League	Apps	Goals	Apps	Goals	Apps	Goals	Apps	Goals
Iran			League		Hazfi Cup		Asia		Total	
2005–06	Rah Ahan	Pro League	1	0			-	-		
2006–07	Rah Ahan	Pro League	5	0			-	-		
2007–08	Rah Ahan	Pro League	0	0			-	-		
2008–09	Rah Ahan	Pro League	12	0			-	-		
2009–10	Rah Ahan	Pro League	14	0	0	0	-	-	14	0
2010–11	Rah Ahan	Pro League	28	1	1	0	-	-	29	0
2011–12	Rah Ahan	Pro League	22	1	1	0	-	-	4	0
2012–13	Rah Ahan	Pro League	19	0	1	0	-	-	20	0
2013–14	Rah Ahan	Pro League	16	1	3	1	-	-	19	2
2014–15	Rah Ahan	Pro League	7	0	1	0	-	-	8	0
Total			124	3	7	1	0	0	131	4
2015–16	Malavan	Persian Gulf Pro League	5	0	0	0	-	-	5	0
2016-17	Malavan	Azadegan League	21	1	1	0	0	0	22	1
Total			26	1	1	0	0	0	27	1
2017-18	Pars Jonoubi	Persian Gulf Pro League	17	1	0	0	0	0	17	1
2018-19	Pars Jonoubi	Persian Gulf Pro League	24	0	2	1	0	0	26	1
Total			41	1	2	1	0	0	43	2
2019-20	Naft MIS	Persian Gulf Pro League	25	3	3	0	0	0	28	3
2020-21	Mes Rafsanjan	Persian Gulf Pro League	19	0	0	0	0	0	19	0
2021-22	Zob Ahan	Persian Gulf Pro League	26	0	0	0	0	0	26	0
2022-23	Zob Ahan	Persian Gulf Pro League	23	0	1	0	0	0	24	0
Total			49	0	1	0	0	0	50	0
2023-24	Malavan	Persian Gulf Pro League	18	0	0	0	0	0	18	0
Career total			302	8	14	2	0	0	316	10

- Assist Goals

Season	Team	Assists
10–11	Rah Ahan	0
