= Hamidreza Rajabi =

Iranian former footballer and coach

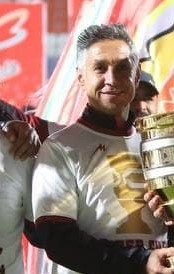

Personal information
- Date of birth: 24 March 1979 (age 47)
- Place of birth: Tehran, Iran
- Position: Midfielder

Team information
- Current team: Esteghlal (assistant manager)

Senior career*
Years	Team	Apps	(Gls)
- Aboomoslem
- Mes Kerman
–2006	PAS Tehran		
2006–2008	Saipa		
2008–2010	Esteghlal Ahvaz		
2010–2011	Sh. Bandar Abbas		
2011–2012	Gostaresh Foulad		

Managerial career
- 2017–2018: Khooneh be Khooneh (assistant)
- 2018–2019: Nassaji (assistant)
- 2019–2021: Foolad (assistant)
- 2021–2023: Foolad (assistant)
- 2023: Foolad (caretaker)
- 2023–: Esteghlal (assistant)
- * Club domestic league appearances and goals

Hamidreza Rajabi (Persian: حمیدرضا رجبی; born 24 March 1979) is an Iranian football coach and retired player. As a player, he has played for Pas, Saipa, Esteghlal Ahvaz in the Iran Pro League and since the beginning of Javad Nekounam's head coaching career, Rajabi has been his assistant in all teams.

== Honours ==
=== Player ===
Pas

- Iran Pro League: 2003–04

Saipa

- Iran Pro League: 2006–07
