= Hossein Pashaei =

Iranian footballer

Personal information
- Full name: Hossein Pashaei
- Date of birth: 7 March 1979 (age 47)
- Place of birth: Iran
- Position: Midfielder

Youth career
- 2000–2002: Pas Tehran

Senior career*
Years	Team	Apps	(Gls)
2002–2007	Pas Tehran		(4)
2007–2014	Rah Ahan	187	(3)
- * Club domestic league appearances and goals as of 10 May 2014

Hossein Pashaei (born March 7, 1979) is an Iranian footballer.

== Club career ==
Pashaei joined Rah Ahan F.C. in 2007.

=== Club Career Statistics ===
Last Update 10 May 2014

Club performance			League		Cup		Continental		Total	
Season	Club	League	Apps	Goals	Apps	Goals	Apps	Goals	Apps	Goals
Iran			League		Hazfi Cup		Asia		Total	
2002–03	Pas	Pro League		1			-	-		
2003–04	Pas	Pro League		0			-	-		
2004–05	Pas	Pro League		0				1		
2005–06	Pas	Pro League	23	2			-	-		
2006–07	Pas	Pro League	22	1			-	-		
2007–08	Rah Ahan	Pro League	24	1			-	-		
2008–09	Rah Ahan	Pro League	31	1			-	-		
2009–10	Rah Ahan	Pro League	33	0	1	0	-	-	34	0
2010–11	Rah Ahan	Pro League	31	0	0	0	-	-	31	0
2011–12	Rah Ahan	Pro League	33	0	0	0	-	-	33	0
2012–13	Rah Ahan	Pro League	30	0	1	1	-	-	31	1
2013–14	Rah Ahan	Pro League	5	1	0	0	-	-	5	1
Career total				7				1		

- Assist Goals

Season	Team	Assists
09–10	Rah Ahan	1
10–11	Rah Ahan	0
11–12	Rah Ahan	0
12–13	Rah Ahan	2
13–14	Rah Ahan	0
