= Gholam Hossein Peyrovani =

Iranian footballer (born 1955)

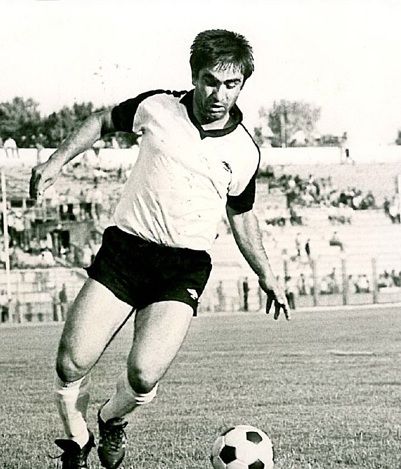

Personal information
- Date of birth: 29 March 1955 (age 71)
- Place of birth: Shiraz, Imperial Iran
- Position: Midfielder

Youth career
- 1967–1969: Bargh Shiraz

Senior career*
Years	Team	Apps	(Gls)
1969–1992	Bargh Shiraz		

International career
1973–1974	Iran U19		

Managerial career
- 1995: Bargh Shiraz
- 1998: Bargh Shiraz
- 1999–2009: Fajr Sepasi
- 2009–2010: Iran U-23
- 2011: Sanat Naft
- 2012: Aboomoslem
- 2013: Fajr Sepasi
- 2016–2017: Fajr Sepasi
- * Club domestic league appearances and goals

Gholam Hossein Peyrovani (Persian: غلامحسین پيروانی, born 29 March 1955, in Shiraz, Iran) is a former Iranian football player and now manager.

He was the coach of the Iran national under-23 football team from 2009 to 2010. He is also the older brother of former Persepolis and Iranian national team player, Afshin Peyrovani, and Amir Hossein Peyrovani.

== Playing career ==
=== Club career ===
In 1969, at the age of 15, Peyrovani joined Shiraz's most popular team, Bargh Shiraz. His father was a big fan of the team as well, and helped the team financially. He quickly established a spot for himself in the team, and eventually became the starting libero. Peyrovani attracted the attention of many and in 1976 was named the best libero of the Takht Jamshid Cup by Donyaye Varzesh (World Of Sports) magazine. He played 25 years for Bargh Shiraz and retired at the age of 40 from competitive football.

=== International career ===
His international career was less spectacular though. He played in the Iranian national youth teams that won the AFC Youth Championship in 1973 and 1974. He was called up several times to the national team but never made the final squad. He also participated in some international tournaments with his club team, but none were of any significance.

== Managerial career ==
Due to his love of Shiraz, he has spent most of his management career in his hometown. He coached Bargh Shiraz briefly on two occasions in 1995 and 1998. His most impressive work though has come with another Shirazi club, Fajr Sepasi. From 1999 to 2009, Despite a very low operating budget, he has been able to keep his teams competitive, almost always using young players. He has discovered several Iranian players such as Davoud Seyed Abbasi, Siavash Akbarpour and Mehdi Rahmati among others. His highest achievement to date with the club has been winning the Hazfi Cup in 2001 and finishing second in consecutive years, in 2002 and 2003.

On 5 January 2009, he was selected as the manager and head coach of Iranian Olympic team by Iranian football federation for 2012 Summer Olympics but he resigned after his side finished fourth in 2010 Asian Games. After his resignation as Olympic team head coach, he became head coach of Iran Pro League side, Sanat Naft. He resigned from his post just after four months. He was later head coach of Aboomoslem.

On 21 May 2013, he signed a three years contract with Fajr Sepasi, the club he managed from 1999 to 2009. His first match at the return to Fajr was a 1–0 loss to Naft Tehran. He resigned as manager of Fajr on 7 September 2013 after a bad start of the league.

== Statistics ==
As of 5 September 2013

Team	From	To	Record							
Team	From	To	G	W	D	L	GF	GA	+/-	Win %
Fajr Sepasi	May 1999	January 2009	310	103	118	89	303	298	+5	33.23
Iran U-23	January 2009	November 2010	13	7	2	4	20	14	+6	53.85
Sanat Naft	March 2011	November 2011	22	6	6	10	29	40	−11	27.27
Fajr Sepasi	June 2013	September 2013	8	1	2	5	6	14	−8	12.50

== Honours ==
=== Player ===
Iran U-19

- AFC Youth Championship:
  - Winner (1): 1973, 1974

=== Manager ===
Fajr Sepasi

- Hazfi Cup:
  - Winner (1): 2000–01
  - Runner-up (2): 2001–02, 2002–03
