= Mojtaba Shiri (footballer, born 1990) =

Iranian footballer

Personal information
- Full name: Mojtaba Shiri
- Date of birth: 13 February 1990 (age 36)
- Place of birth: Qom, Iran
- Height: 1.73 m (5 ft 8 in)
- Position: Winger

Youth career
- 2005–2010: Saba Qom
- 2010–2011: Moghavemat Tehran

Senior career*
Years	Team	Apps	(Gls)
2008–2010	Saba Qom	1	(0)
2011–2013	Rah Ahan	56	(15)
2013–2014	Naft Tehran	5	(2)
2014–2015	Rah Ahan	18	(4)
2015–2016	Paykan	24	(5)
2016	Baadraan Tehran	7	(1)
2017–2019	Gol Reyhan	14	(1)
- * Club domestic league appearances and goals as of 3 September 2019

Mojtaba Shiri (Persian: مجتبی شیری; born 13 February 1990) is an Iranian footballer.

== Club career ==
Shiri joined Rah Ahan in summer 2011 after success in technical test by the coach, Ali Daei.

== Club career statistics ==
Last Update 14 June 2019

Club performance			League		Cup		Continental		Total	
Season	Club	League	Apps	Goals	Apps	Goals	Apps	Goals	Apps	Goals
Iran			League		Hazfi Cup		Asia		Total	
2008–09	Saba Qom	Pro League	1	0	0	0	0	0	1	0
2009–10	Saba Qom	Pro League	0	0	0	0	—		0	0
2011–12	Rah Ahan	Pro League	18	5	0	0	—		18	5
2012–13	Rah Ahan	Pro League	29	8	0	0	—		29	8
2013–14	Rah Ahan	Pro League	9	2	0	0	—		9	2
2013–14	Naft Tehran	Pro League	5	2	0	0	—		5	2
2014–15	Rah Ahan	Pro League	18	4	0	0	—		18	4
2015–16	Paykan	Division 1	24	5	0	0	—		24	5
2016–17	Baadraan	Division 1	7	1	1	0	—		8	1
2016–17	Gol Reyhan	Division 1	10	1	0	0	—		10	1
2017–18	Gol Reyhan	Division 1	0	0	0	0	—		0	0
2018–19	Gol Reyhan	Division 1	4	0	0	0	—		4	0
Career total			125	28	1	0	0	0	126	28

== Personal life ==
During the Mahsa Amini protests, Shiri supported fellow footballer Amir Reza Nasr Azadani, who was jailed as a result of the protests, by posting a picture of the latter with calls for the authorities to not execute Azadani.
