= Majid Saleh =

Iranian footballer and coach (born 1966)

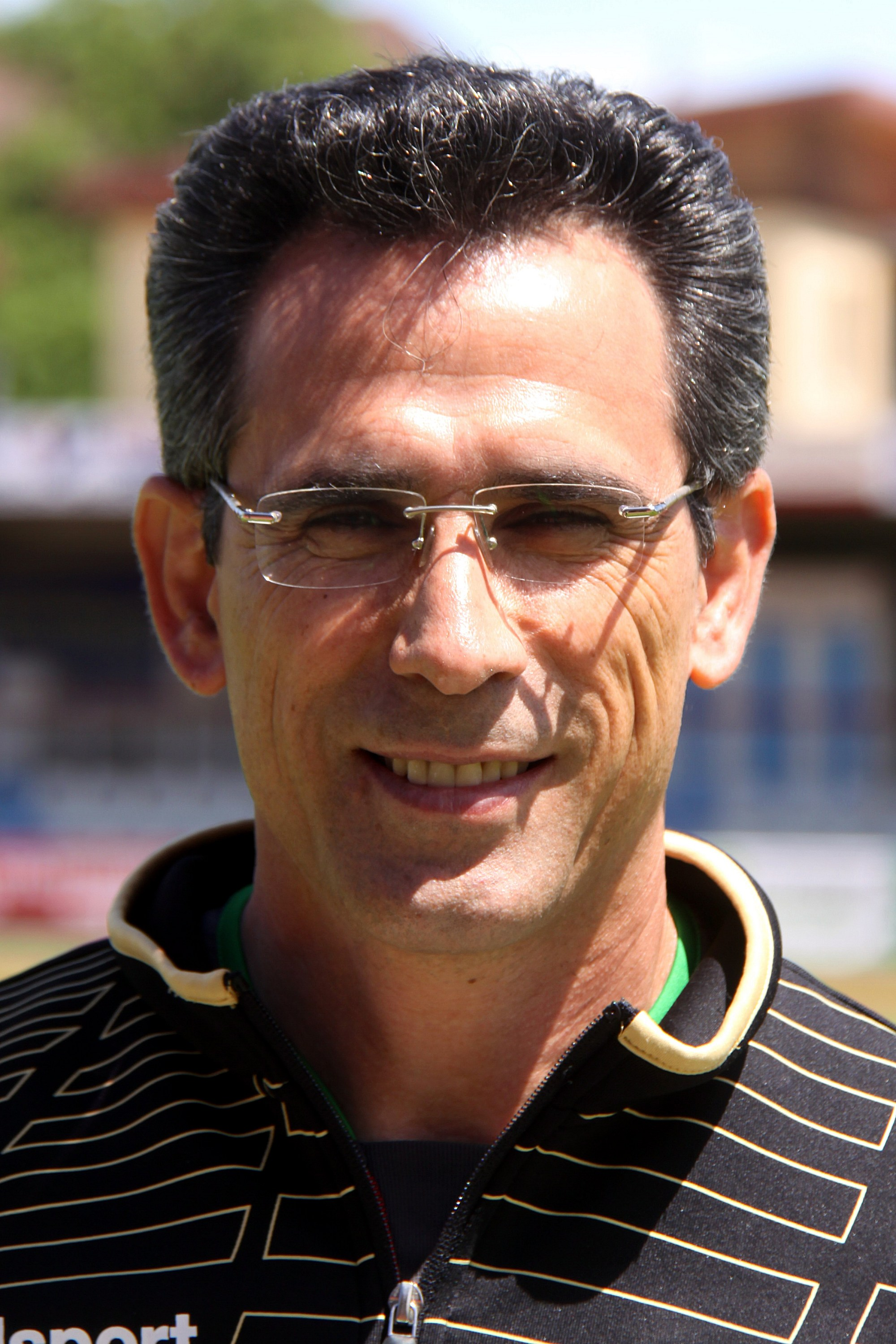
- Saleh in 2014

Personal information
- Full name: Majid Saleh
- Date of birth: 11 January 1966 (age 60)
- Place of birth: Tehran, Imperial State of Iran
- Position: Midfielder

Team information
- Current team: Paykan (assistant coach)

Senior career*
Years	Team	Apps	(Gls)
1983–1990	Homa		
1990–1991	Bank Tejarat		
1991–1992	Keshavarz		
1992–1998	Saipa		
1996	→ Pas (loan)		
1999–2001	Bahman		
2001–2004	Homa		

International career
1987–1995	Iran U23		
1990–1996	Iran (futsal)		

Managerial career
- 2004–2006: Saipa (assistant)
- 2007–2008: Mes Kerman (assistant)
- 2008: Esteghlal (assistant)
- 2008–2011: Zob Ahan (assistant)
- 2011–2012: Saipa
- 2012–2014: Esteghlal (assistant)
- 2014: Iran (assistant)
- 2014: Malavan (assistant)
- 2014–2015: Iran U-23 (assistant)
- 2015–2016: Esteghlal (assistant)
- 2017–2018: Paykan (assistant)
- 2018–2019: Fajr Sepasi
- 2019–2020: Paykan (assistant)
- 2024–: Academy Inter
- * Club domestic league appearances and goals

Majid Saleh (Persian: مجید صالح; born 11 January 1966) is a retired Iranian football player and current coach.

== Early life ==
He was born on 21 May 1965 in Tehran. His father was an employee of SAIPA, an Iranian auto manufacturer. He is also a member of SAIPA since 1993 and is an electronics engineer and hardware engineer.

== Playing career ==
=== Club career ===
He started his playing career in 1983 when he played for Homa F.C. He then played for Bank Tejarat F.C. under Nasser Hejazi. In 1991, he left Bank Tejarat to play for Keshavarz F.C. Then he played for Saipa F.C. for 4 seasons and a season in loan for Pas Tehran. Then he left Saipa in 1998 and joined to Bahman F.C. in 1999. Finally, in 2001 he returned and started playing for Homa F.C. once again. He retired in June 2004.

=== International career ===
From 1985 to 1995 in youth teams, U-18 and U-23 and Tehran adult team with Ali Parvin, Parviz Dehdari, Mohammad Mayeli Kohan and two foreign coaches Stankovich and Arie Haan.

== Managerial career ==
First coaching in Saipa F.C. as assistant manager from June 2004 until June 2006 besides Bijan Zolfagharnasab. In the seventh league besides Amir Ghalenoei in Mes Kerman F.C. and immediately in Esteghlal as Ghalenoei's assistant in Hazfi Cup. In the 2008–09, 2009–10 and 2010–11 Iran Pro League, he was first assistant of Mansour Ebrahimzadeh in Zob Ahan. He was appointed as head coach of Saipa F.C. on 31 May 2011 to succeed Mohammad Mayeli Kohan but was sacked on 15 February 2012 after failed to connect with the young players of the club. He was named as assistant coach of Esteghlal on 2 June 2012 after Amir Ghalenoei becomes head coach of Esteghlal for a third spell.

On April 14, 2014, Saleh was named as Carlos Queiroz's assistant coach in Iran national football team. However, he left his position before the 2014 FIFA World Cup. On October 8, 2014, he became assistant coach of Malavan.

On June 21, 2015, he returned to Esteghlal as Parviz Mazloumi's first assistant coach.

=== Statistics ===
Team	From	To	Record				
Team	From	To	G	W	D	L	Win %
Saipa	1 July 2011	15 February 2012	27	7	10	10	25.93
Fajr Sepasi	18 July 2018	31 December 2018	9	1	5	3	11.11
Total			35	8	15	12	22.86

As of 28 December 2018

== Honors ==
=== Player ===
- Azadegan League:
  - Winner: 1993–94

=== Assistant Manager ===
- AFC Champions League:
  - Runner-up: 2010
- Iran Pro League:
  - Winner: 2012–13
  - Runner-up: 2009–10
- Hazfi Cup:
  - Winner: 2007–08
