= Mohamed Ali Gharzoul =

French footballer (born 1985)

Personal information
- Date of birth: 14 December 1985 (age 40)
- Place of birth: Tarbes, France
- Height: 1.88 m (6 ft 2 in)
- Position: Centre-back

Senior career*
Years	Team	Apps	(Gls)
2004–2006	Toulouse		
2006–2008	Club Africain		
2008–2011	Sedan	13	(0)
2011–2012	Club Africain	2	(0)
2012	Rah Ahan	7	(0)
- * Club domestic league appearances and goals as of 23:17, 06 May 2012 (UTC)

Mohamed Ali Gharzoul (Arabic: محمد علي الغرزول, born 14 December 1985) is a French professional footballer who plays as a centre-back.
