= Dariush Mikaeili =

Iranian footballer

Personal information
- Full name: Asadollah Mikaeili
- Place of birth: Iran
- Position: Midfielder

Team information
- Current team: Naft Tehran

Senior career*
Years	Team	Apps	(Gls)
- Aboumoslem
2007–2009	Shirin Faraz	40	(1)
2009 –	Naft Tehran	33	(4)
- * Club domestic league appearances and goals as of 10 September 2010 ‡ National team caps and goals as of 21 August 2010

Asadollah Mikaeili, better known as Dariush Mikaeili is an Iranian footballer who plays for Naft Tehran F.C. in the Iranian Premier League.

== Club career ==
Mikaeli moved to Naft Tehran F.C. in 2009 after spending the previous season with Shirin Faraz of the Azadegan League.
