= Ali Gholam =

Iranian footballer

Personal information
- Full name: Ali Gholam
- Date of birth: 4 August 1981 (age 45)
- Place of birth: Iran
- Height: 1.81 m (5 ft 11 in)
- Position: Midfielder

Senior career*
Years	Team	Apps	(Gls)
- Rah Ahan
- Nirouye Zamini
- Tractor Sazi
–2009	Nirouye Zamini		
2009–2011	Paykan	8	(0)
2011–2014	Rah Ahan	26	(0)
- * Club domestic league appearances and goals as of 4 August 2012 (UTC)

Ali Gholam (Persian: علی غلام; born 4 August 1981) is an Iranian professional footballer who played as a midfielder. Over his career, he featured for clubs such as Paykan FC, Rah Ahan FC, Nirouye Zamini, and Tractor Sazi.

== Club career ==
In July 2011, Gholam joined Rah Ahan.
