= Founéké Sy =

Malian footballer (1986–2020)

Personal information
- Full name: Founéké Sy
- Date of birth: 21 July 1986
- Place of birth: Bamako, Mali
- Date of death: 4 April 2020 (aged 33)
- Place of death: Mali
- Height: 1.89 m (6 ft 2 in)
- Position: Forward

Senior career*
Years	Team	Apps	(Gls)
2005–2006	Centre Salif Keita	23	(10)
2006–2008	Djoliba A.C.	30	(14)
2007–2008	AS Korofina	32	(13)
2008–2009	Jeanne D'Arc	28	(12)
2009–2010	Nassaji	20	(7)
2010–2011	Iranjavan	18	(11)
2011–2012	Sanat Naft	32	(20)
2012–2013	Ajman Club	24	(11)
2013–2015	Al Ittihad Kalba	25	(14)
2015	Masafi Club		
2015–2018	Al-Ahly Shendi	18	(9)

International career
2009	Mali	1	(0)
- * Club domestic league appearances and goals as of May 3, 2016

Founéké Sy (21 July 1986 – 4 April 2020) was a Malian footballer.

== Club career ==
Sy played his entire career in the Malian Première Division before moving to Iran in 2009. He played for Nassaji Mazandaran and Iranjavan in Azadegan League. After having two good seasons in Iran's first division league, He joined Pro League team Sanat Naft. In 2011–12 of Iran Pro League he became second best goal-scorer of the season.

== International career ==
In 2009, Sy featured for the Mali national football team in their World Cup qualifying match against Sudan.

== Death ==
On 5 April 2020, it was announced that Sy had died in a car crash.

== Career statistics ==
Club performance			League		Cup		Continental		Total	
Season	Club	League	Apps	Goals	Apps	Goals	Apps	Goals	Apps	Goals
Iran			League		Cup		Continental		Total	
2009–10	Nassaji	Azadegan League	20	7			-	-	20	7
2010–11	Iranjavan	Azadegan League	18	9			-	-	18	9
2011–12	Sanat Naft	Persian Gulf Cup	32	20	2	2	-	-	34	22
UAE			League		Cup		Continental		Total	
2012–13	Ajman	UAE Pro-League	24	11	8	11	-	-	32	22
Career total			94	36	10	13	0	0	104	60

- Assists

Season	Team	Assists
2011–12	Sanat Naft	8
