= Ali Kalantari =

Iranian footballer and coach

Personal information
- Full name: Ali Kalantari
- Date of birth: March 21, 1968 (age 58)
- Place of birth: Shiraz, Imperial Iran
- Height: 1.68 m (5 ft 6 in)
- Position: Midfielder

Team information
- Current team: Bargh Shiraz (manager)

Youth career
- 1982–1986: Peyman

Senior career*
Years	Team	Apps	(Gls)
1986–1989	Oghab		
1990–1992	Koma		
1992–2000	Bargh Shiraz		

Managerial career
- 2001–2009: Bargh Shiraz (assistant)
- 2009–2010: Bargh Shiraz
- 2010–2011: Fajr Sepasi
- 2012–2013: Foolad Yazd
- 2013–2014: Fajr Sepasi (assistant)
- 2014–2016: Fajr Sepasi
- 2016: Mes Rafsanjan
- 2017–2018: Fajr Sepasi
- 2020–2022: Fajr Sepasi
- 2023: Van Pars Naghsh-e Jahan
- 2023: Damash Gilan
- 2023–2024: Mes Soongoun
- 2024: Naft Masjed Soleyman
- 2024–2025: Mes Soongoun
- 2025–: Bargh Shiraz
- * Club domestic league appearances and goals

Ali Kalantari (Persian: علی کلانتری; born 21 March 1968, in Shiraz) is an Iranian football coach and former player who is currently head coach of Bargh Shiraz.

== Honours ==
Fajr Sepasi

- Azadegan League: 2020–21
