= Sergei Leonov =

Russian journalist

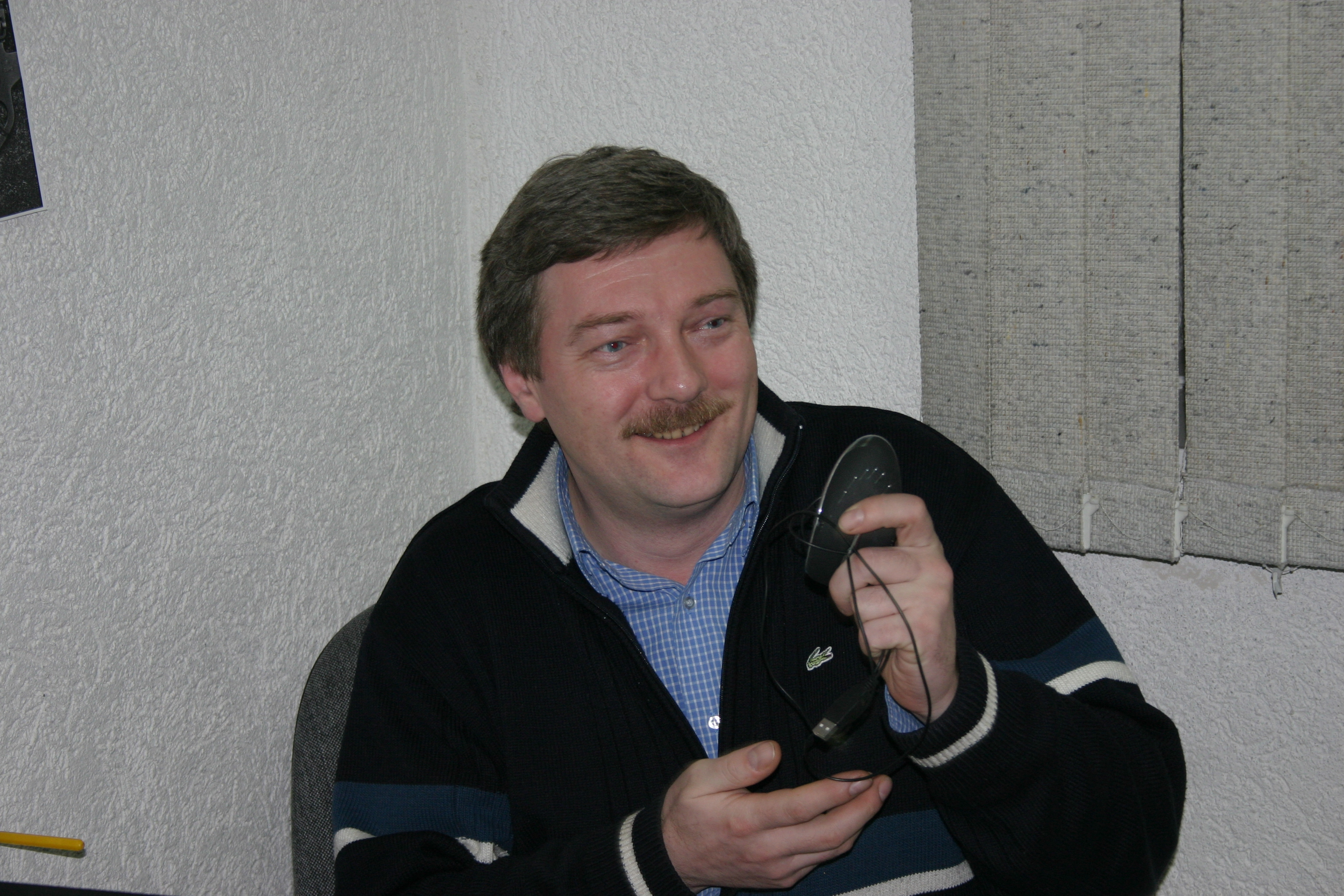
Sergei Leonov

Sergei Alexandrovich Leonov is a Russian journalist, senior editor and an important author of Computerra weekly. He is the author of numerous articles about IT and modern science.

== Biography ==
- Since 1997 — prints in Computerra
- 1998—2004 — senior editor of Computerra
- 2004—2006 — editor-in-chief of Computerra
- с 2006 — senior editor of Computerra

== As a Journalist ==
Sergei Leonov is the author of several hundred articles, published in: Computerra, Home Computer, Infobusiness, CIO, Business-magazine. He was an editor-in-chief of Computerra for three years. Now he is a senior editor.

Preceded by Eugene Kozlovsky	Editor-in-chief of Computerra; 2004—2006	Succeeded by Dmitry Mendrelyuk
