= Asghar Sharafi =

Iranian football coach and former player (born 1942)

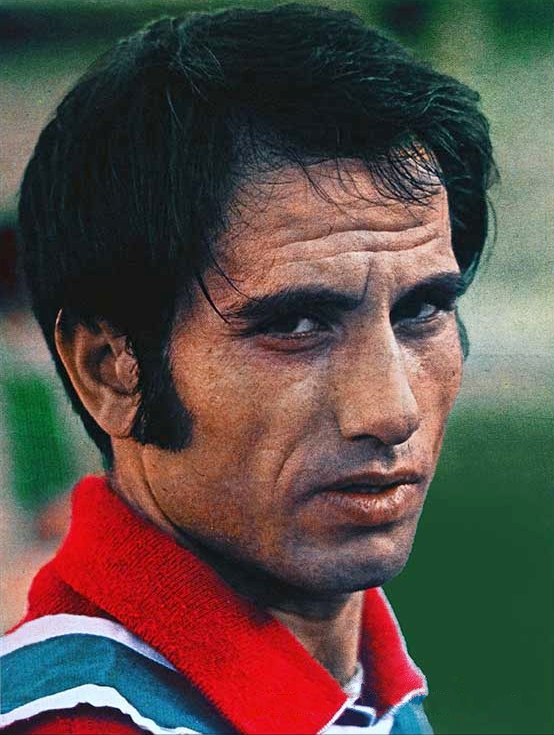

Personal information
- Date of birth: 22 December 1942 (age 83)
- Place of birth: Tehran, Iran
- Height: 1.70 m (5 ft 7 in)
- Position: Striker

Youth career
- 1960–1962: Shahin

Senior career*
Years	Team	Apps	(Gls)
1962–1963	Shahin		
1963–1964	Taj		
1964–1974	Pas		

International career
1967–1973	Iran	11	(1)

Managerial career
- 1974–1975: Iran U-23 (Assistant)
- 1975–1978: Iran (Assistant)
- 1978–1982: Esteghlal (Assistant)
- 1982–1983: Esteghlal
- 1993–1997: Iranjavan
- 1997–2000: Iran (Assistant)
- 2000–2001: Bargh Shiraz
- 2002: Pegah Gilan
- 2006–2007: Ekbatan
- 2007–2008: DAC Dunajská Streda
- 2009–2010: Iranjavan
- 2011–2012: Mes Sarcheshmeh
- 2012–2013: Bargh Shiraz
- * Club domestic league appearances and goals

Asghar Sharafi (Persian: اصغر شرفی, born 22 December 1942) is an Iranian football coach and former player who was head coach of Mes Sarcheshmeh. He has coached many teams such as Esteghlal, Iranjavan, Bargh Shiraz, Pegah and Ekbatan. He is one of the oldest head coaches in Iranian football history.

== Playing career ==
Sharafi has one brother and one sister. He began his football career at Shahin and then joined the Taj. In 1964 he moved to PAS Tehran and was a teammate of Mohammad Ranjbar, Hassan Habibi and Mahmoud Yavari. Between 1967 and 1973 he was a member of the national team and won the 1968 and 1972 AFC Asian Cups. He played one match at the 1970 Asian Games and 1972 Summer Olympics each and scored one goal in 1970.
