= Hossein Kaebi =

Iranian footballer

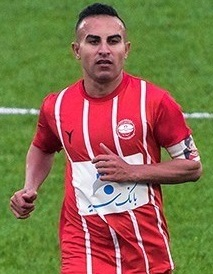

Personal information
- Full name: Hossein Kaebi
- Date of birth: 23 September 1985 (age 41)
- Place of birth: Ahvaz, Iran
- Height: 1.67 m (5 ft 5 1/2 in)
- Position: Right back

Team information
- Current team: Foolad (assistant)

Youth career
- 2000–2002: Esteghlal Ahwaz

Senior career*
Years	Team	Apps	(Gls)
2002–2004	Foolad	42	(5)
2004–2005	Al-Sadd	18	(3)
2005–2006	Foolad	26	(2)
2006–2007	Emirates	7	(1)
2007	Persepolis	6	(3)
2007–2008	Leicester City	3	(0)
2008	Persepolis	10	(0)
2008–2009	Saipa	26	(1)
2009–2011	Steel Azin	55	(5)
2011–2013	Rah Ahan	34	(1)
2013	Sanat Naft	19	(0)
2013–2014	Esteghlal Khuzestan	19	(0)
2016–2018	Sepidrood	30	(2)
Total		295	(23)

International career^{‡}
2000–2001	Iran U17	13	(0)
2000–2003	Iran U20		
2002–2007	Iran U23	17	(2)
2002–2010	Iran	84	(1)

Managerial career
- 2019–: Foolad (assistant)
Medal record
Representing Iran
Asian Games
Gold medal – first place	2002 Busan	Team competition
- * Club domestic league appearances and goals as of 15:09, 19 July 2016 (UTC) ‡ National team caps and goals as of 09:02, 6 January 2010 (UTC)

Hossein Kaebi (Persian: حسین کعبی, born 23 September 1985) is an Iranian former professional footballer who last played for Sepidrood and Perspolis, among other clubs in the Persian Gulf Pro League.

== Club career ==
Kaebi started his football in Esteghlal Ahvaz F.C. youth academy, before moving to Foolad. It was in this club that Croatian coach Vinko Begović quickly discovered him and soon he was in the first team line-up despite his tender young age. He was selected for the U17 team that played in the AFC U-17 Championship 2000. He was also selected for the national team soon after the Asian Championship. Kaebi started getting attention from European clubs at an early age and went on a 3-week trial at Wolverhampton Wanderers in 2003. He was part of the Team that won Iran's Premier Football League in 2004 with Foolad for the first time. Kaebi disappointed many when he signed for UAE club Emirates. Kaebi signed a contract with Persepolis F.C. on 25 February 2007 on a 6-month deal.

On 5 July 2007, he signed a two-year deal with Leicester City for an undisclosed fee, making his debut as a substitute in a 4–1 win over Watford on 25 August. Kaebi used a translator to speak for him during his time at Leicester City as he could not speak English. He was relegated to the reserve squad following the sacking of Martin Allen on 29 August.

Kaebi revealed on 19 September that he was settling in well with the club and was eager to show his talent to the fans. But on 15 October, he told the Leicester Mercury that he was frustrated at being left in the reserve squad. This left many Iranian fans to question the club's decision to leave an international footballer out of the first team setup. Kaebi later declared to Sky Sports that if his "time on the bench continues then" he would consider leaving Leicester.

He finally made his long-awaited start on 11 December in a 3–1 defeat to Ipswich Town on 11 December 2007. He was however transfer listed by then-manager Ian Holloway on 23 December, eight days after featuring in a 2–0 defeat to Hull City, his last ever appearance for the club. He was released by mutual consent on 4 February 2008, after he failed to secure a move from Leicester when the January transfer window closed.

=== Return to Iran ===
He was returned to Persepolis after he failed to make an impact at Leicester City. He won the Iran's Premier Football League for the second time under Afshin Ghotbi. Despite the offer from Persepolis F.C. he decided to move to Saipa F.C. He said he wanted to experience new team and he could not continue playing for Persepolis F.C. but he never said why. Many others believed that he moved to Saipa F.C. for a better offer. After 2 seasons he settled in one club and played in Asian Champions League also played 26 games in 2008–9 season for Saipa.Then he joined Steel Azin and spent two seasons before joining Rah Ahan in 2011 where he joined his beloved coach Ali Daei where they fall apart after Kaebi failed to attend few training sessions on time and he decided to leave and move to Sanat Naft in January 2013 where he stayed for half a season and 6 months before joining Esteghlal Khuzestan for 2013–14 season. After a short stint at Sepidrood, he announced his retirement from football in December 2018.

=== Club career statistics ===
As of 19 December 2018

==== World record ====
In March 2025, Transfer Market claimed that Hossein Kaabi was the only footballer in the world with the most national team appearances before the age of 24.

Club performance			League		Cup		Continental		Total	
Season	Club	League	Apps	Goals	Apps	Goals	Apps	Goals	Apps	Goals
Iran			League		Hazfi Cup		Asia		Total	
2002–03	Foolad	Pro League	24	4	0	0	-	-	24	4
2003–04	Foolad	Pro League	18	1	2	0	-	-	20	1
Qatar			League		Emir of Qatar Cup		Asia		Total	
2004–05	Al Sadd	Qatar Stars League	18	3	0	0	6	2	24	5
Iran			League		Hazfi Cup		Asia		Total	
2005–06	Foolad	Pro League	26	2	0	0	5	0	31	2
United Arab Emirates			League		President's Cup		Asia		Total	
2006–07	Emirates	UAE Football League	7	1	0	0	-	-	7	1
Iran			League		Hazfi Cup		Asia		Total	
2006–07	Persepolis	Pro League	6	3	1	0	-	-	7	3
England			League		FA Cup		Europe		Total	
2007–08	Leicester City	Championship	3	0	0	0	-	-	3	0
Iran			League		Hazfi Cup		Asia		Total	
2007–08	Persepolis	Pro League	10	0	0	0	-	-	10	0
2008–09	Saipa	Pro League	26	1	1	0	2	0	29	1
2009–10	Steel Azin	Pro League	30	4	3	1	-	-	33	5
2010–11	Steel Azin	Pro League	25	1	2	0	-	-	27	1
2011–12	Rah Ahan	Pro League	26	1	1	0	-	-	27	1
2012–13	Rah Ahan	Pro League	8	0	0	0	-	-	8	0
2012–13	Sanat Naft	Pro League	19	0	0	0	-	-	19	0
2013–14	Esteghlal Khuzestan	Pro League	19	0	0	0	-	-	19	0
2016–17	Sepidrood	Azadegan League		2	-	-	-	-		2
2017–18	Sepidrood	Pro League	26	0	1	0	-	-	27	0
2018–19	Sepidrood	Pro League	8	0	0	0	-	-	8	0
Total	Iran		271	19	11	1	7	0	289	20
Total	Qatar		18	3	0	0	6	2	24	5
Total	United Arab Emirates		7	1	0	0	-	-	7	1
Total	England		3	0	0	0	-	-	3	0
Career total			299	23	11	1	13	2	323	26

- Assist Goals

Season	Team	Assists
05–06	Foolad	2
07–08	Leicester City	1
07–08	Persepolis	1
08–09	Saipa	1
09–10	Steel Azin	2
10–11	Steel Azin	0
11–12	Rah Ahan	2
12–13	Rah Ahan	0
12–13	Sanat Naft	1

== International career ==
Kaebi won his first cap having just turned 17, scoring his first international goal against Cameroon League XI on 15 August 2003, although the match was not considered an official international. He scored his first official goal for Iran against New Zealand in the 2003 AFC/OFC Cup Challenge . In 2004, he was named amongst World Soccer Magazine's Top 10 most promising players. He was in Iran squad for 2004 Asian Cup which finished third and he also won the 2004 West Asian Football Federation Championship in Tehran. Kaebi was in the Iran squad for the 2006 FIFA World Cup, appearing in all three matches of the group stage. His most memorable performance came against Portugal, where he was able to clamp down both Cristiano Ronaldo and Luís Figo. He was also included in the squad for the 2007 Asian Cup, making just one appearance against China, which ended in a 2–2 draw. He was called to Team Melli for 2010 FIFA World Cup qualifying matches. He also performed in the 2011 AFC Asian Cup qualification for Team Melli. In 2009, he made a mistake against Qatar in a friendly, which Iran lost in the last minute and Kaebi was dropped for the rest of the games and was used as a substitute for a while.

=== International caps ===
Iran
Year	Apps	Goals
2002	2	0
2003	9	1
2004	17	0
2005	11	0
2006	9	0
2007	2	0
2008	15	0
2009	18	0
2010	1	0
Total	84	1

=== International goals ===
Scores and results list Iran's goal tally first.

#	Date	Venue	Opponent	Score	Result	Competition
1	12 October 2003	Azadi Stadium, Tehran	New Zealand	3–0	3–0	AFC/OFC Cup Challenge

== Honours ==
=== Club ===
- Iran Pro League Winner: 2
  - 2004/05 with Foolad
  - 2007/08 with Persepolis F.C.

=== International ===
Iran

- AFC/OFC Cup Challenge winner:
  - 2003
- WAFF Championship winner:
  - 2004
- Asian Cup
  - Third Place:
    - 2004
- AFC U-16 Championship
  - Runner-up:
    - AFC U-17 Championship 2000

Iran U23

- Asian Games Gold Medal: 2002
