= Fajr Sepasi Shiraz F.C. =

Iranian football club

Fajr فجر
- Full name: Fajr Shahid Sepasi Shiraz Football Club
- Nicknames: Tâlâyiha-ye Shiraz (The golden ones from Shiraz); Zard Parsi (Persian yellow)
- Founded: 11 February 1988; 38 years ago
- Ground: Pars Shiraz Stadium
- Capacity: 50,000
- Owner: Basij
- Chairman: Rasoul Fallah
- Head Coach: Mehdi Rajabzadeh
- League: Persian Gulf Pro League
- 2025–26: Persian Gulf Pro League, 8th of 16
| Home colours | Away colours |

Fajr Shahid Sepasi Shiraz Football Club (Persian: باشگاه فرهنگى ورزشى فجر شهید سپاسی شیراز, Bashgah-e Farhangi-e Varzeshi-e Futbal-e Fajr-e Sepasi-ye Shiraz), commonly known as Fajr Sepasi Shiraz, or Fajr Sepasi, is an Iranian football club based in Shiraz, Fars, that competes in the Iran pro league (Persian Gulf league). The club was founded in 1988.

The football team plays their home games at the Pars Shiraz Stadium which has a seating capacity of 50,000. The club is owned and supported by the Basij.

== History ==
=== Establishment ===
In 1988, a group of youngsters, who were from Shiraz along with Jafar Jafari, established a football team named Behzad. They started playing in the 2nd division of Shiraz's local city league. After the death of Majid Sepasi during the Iran–Iraq War, the team was renamed in Fajr Shahid Sepasi Shiraz Football Club. Shahid means martyr in Persian. The club was officially founded on 11 February 1988, the day of the Islamic revolution. In 1991 the club had been bought by Sepah Pasdaran completely.

=== 1990s ===
In 1995 they became champions of Fars province, and in 1996 were promoted to the Azadegan League. The club has remained in the highest level of Iranian football since then, and won the Hazfi Cup in 2001.

=== Takeover ===
Moghavemat Shahid Sepasi emblem (2007–2011)

In December 2006 Sepah Pasdaran sold its shares in sport to Basij, therefore all Fajr teams were renamed to Moghavemat teams. Fajr Sepasi are now officially known as Moghavemat Shahid Sepasi Shiraz, although the name is not in common use yet. Jafar Jafari is the club's chairman since the establishment of the club in 1988.

They kept the coach Gholam Hossein Peyrovani till 2009 where he was appointed as Iran's olympics team head coach and had to leave the club so Peyrovani left the club after 10 years being in charge and he was finished his last season in mid table and was replaced by Davoud Mahabadi and after poor results he was replaced by Mohammad Ahmadzadeh and got relegated in the first season without Peyrovani.

In 2010 for the first time in the club's history, the team was relegated to the Azadegan League for the 2010–2011 season. Fajr rebounded gaining promotion to the Iran Pro League in 2011.

==== Azadegan League ====
At the end of the 2013–14 season Fajr Sepasi finished 14th and was relegated to the Azadegan League. In their first season back in the second tier Fajr finished 14th and missed out on promotion.

== Shiraz Derby ==
The Shiraz Derby is played between Fajr Sepasi and Bargh Shiraz, but due to Bargh's relegation to the Azadegan League and then the 2nd Division, the derby has not been played in over 5 years.

== Season-by-season ==
The table below chronicles the achievements of Fajr Sepasi in various competitions since 1995.

| Season | Division | League | Position | Hazfi Cup | Notes | AFC Champions League |
|---|---|---|---|---|---|---|
| 1995–96 | 3 | Fars Province League | 1st | Did not qualify | Promoted | Did not qualify |
| 1996–97 | 2 | 2nd Division | 1st | 1/16 Final | Promoted | Did not qualify |
| 1997–98 | 1 | Azadegan League | 4th | Not held | | Did not qualify |
| 1998–99 | 1 | Azadegan League | 10th | 1/16 Final | | Did not qualify |
| 1999–00 | 1 | Azadegan League | 3rd | 1/8 Final | | Did not qualify |
| 2000–01 | 1 | Azadegan League | 9th | Cup | | Did not qualify |
| 2001–02 | 1 | Iran Pro League | 10th | Final | | First round |
| 2002–03 | 1 | Iran Pro League | 4th | Final | | Did not qualify |
| 2003–04 | 1 | Iran Pro League | 11th | 1/8 Final | | Did not qualify |
| 2004–05 | 1 | Iran Pro League | 11th | 1/16 Final | | Did not qualify |
| 2005–06 | 1 | Iran Pro League | 10th | 1/8 Final | | Did not qualify |
| 2006–07 | 1 | Iran Pro League | 10th | 1/16 Final | | Did not qualify |
| 2007–08 | 1 | Iran Pro League | 14th | 1/8 Final | | Did not qualify |
| 2008–09 | 1 | Iran Pro League | 9th | 1/16 Final | | Did not qualify |
| 2009–10 | 1 | Iran Pro League | 16th | 1/16 Final | Relegated | Did not qualify |
| 2010–11 | 2 | Azadegan League | 2nd | 1/32 Final | Promoted | Did not qualify |
| 2011–12 | 1 | Iran Pro League | 13th | 1/8 Final | | Did not qualify |
| 2012–13 | 1 | Iran Pro League | 12th | 1/4 Final | | Did not qualify |
| 2013–14 | 1 | Iran Pro League | 14th | 1/16 Final | Relegated | Did not qualify |
| 2014–15 | 2 | Azadegan League | 5th | 1/8 Final | | Did not qualify |
| 2015–16 | 2 | Azadegan League | 4th | Did not enter | | Did not qualify |
| 2016–17 | 2 | Azadegan League | 14th | Round of 64 | | Did not qualify |
| 2017–18 | 2 | Azadegan League | 4th | Round of 16 | | Did not qualify |
| 2018–19 | 2 | Azadegan League | 9th | Round of 64 | | Did not qualify |
| 2019–20 | 2 | Azadegan League | 10th | Round of 16 | | Did not qualify |
| 2020–21 | 2 | Azadegan League | 1st | Did not enter | Promoted | Did not qualify |
| 2021–22 | 1 | Iran Pro League | 15th | Round of 32 | Relegated | Did not qualify |
| 2022–23 | 2 | Azadegan League | 4th | Round of 32 | | Did not qualify |

== Honours ==
- Azadegan League
  - Champions (2): 2020–21, 2024-25
- Hazfi Cup
  - Champions (1): 2000–01
  - Runners-up (2): 2001–02, 2002–03
- Iranian 2nd Division
  - Champions (1): 1997
- AK Pipe International Cup
  - Runners-up (1): 2001

== Players ==
=== First team squad ===
As of 27 August 2026

Note: Flags indicate national team as defined under FIFA eligibility rules; some limited exceptions apply. Players may hold more than one non-FIFA nationality.

| No. | Pos. | Nation | Player |
|---|---|---|---|
| 1 | GK | IRI | Ali Gholamzadeh |
| 2 | DF | IRI | Arshia Vosoughifard |
| 3 | DF | IRI | Ali Helichi |
| 4 | MF | IRI | Saeid Mehri |
| 5 | DF | IRI | Seyed Majid Nasiri |
| 6 | MF | IRI | Masoud Rigi (captain) |
| 7 | MF | IRI | Ehsan Pahlavan |
| 9 | FW | IRI | Mehdi Sharifi |
| 10 | MF | IRI | Yadegar Rostami ^{U23} |
| 11 | DF | IRI | Meysam Moradi |
| 14 | DF | IRI | Shahin Tavakoli |
| 15 | DF | IRI | Danial Jahanbakhsh |
| 16 | MF | IRI | Mehdi Bahraminejad ^{U21} |
| 17 | FW | IRI | Hossein Shahabi |
| 18 | MF | IRI | Mehdi Rezaei ^{U23} |

| No. | Pos. | Nation | Player |
|---|---|---|---|
| 20 | DF | IRI | Sina Norouzi ^{U19} |
| 21 | GK | IRI | Erfan Esfandiyari |
| 27 | DF | IRI | Mohammad Ali Faramarzi |
| 29 | FW | IRI | Abolfazl Moredi ^{U21} |
| 30 | MF | IRI | Mohammadreza Moslemi Javid |
| 33 | DF | IRI | Mahan Ahmadzadeh ^{U25} |
| 66 | MF | IRI | Alireza Afkham ^{U23} |
| 70 | MF | IRI | Hossein Nokhodkar ^{U25} |
| 76 | DF | IRI | Amir Shabani |
| 77 | FW | IRI | Soheil Fadakar |
| 88 | MF | IRI | Mehdi Yousefi |
| 90 | DF | IRI | Esmaeil Falamarzi ^{U21} |
| 98 | GK | IRI | Alireza Rezaei |
| 99 | MF | IRI | Farnam Arab ^{U23} |
| — | GK | IRI | Alireza Beiranvand (on loan from Tractor) |

== Former players ==
For details on former players, see Fajr Sepasi Shiraz F.C. players.

== Head coaches ==
- (Iran) Mansour Pourheidari (1996–1998)
- (Iran) Mahmoud Yavari (1998–1999)
- (Iran) Gholam Hossein Peyrovani (1999–2009)
- (Iran) Davoud Mahabadi (2009–2010)
- (Iran) Mohammad Ahmadzadeh (2010)
- (Iran) Ali Kalantari (2010–2011)
- (Iran) Mahmoud Yavari (2011–2013)
- (Iran) Gholam Hossein Peyrovani (2013)
- (Iran) Mahmoud Yavari (2013–2014)
- (Iran) Ali Kalantari (2014–2018)
- (Iran) Majid Saleh (2018–2019)
- (Iran) Davoud Mahabadi (2019–2020)
- (Iran) Ali Kalantari (2020–?)
- (Iran) Pirouz Ghorbani (2024–present)
