= Márcio Alemão =

Brazilian footballer

Personal information
- Full name: Márcio José Narciso
- Date of birth: 21 January 1981 (age 45)
- Place of birth: Flórida Paulista, Brazil
- Height: 1.86 m (6 ft 1 in)
- Position: Defender

Youth career
- Palmeiras

Senior career*
| Years | Team | Apps | (Gls) |
| 2005–2007 | Treze | | |
| 2005 | → Estrela Amadora (loan) | | |
| 2005 | → Criciúma (loan) | | |
| 2006 | → Santa Cruz (loan) | | |
| 2007–2010 | Ipatinga | 11 | (0) |
| 2007 | → Ituano (loan) | 3 | (1) |
| 2007 | → Juventude (loan) | 6 | (0) |
| 2008 | → Confiança (loan) | 18 | (1) |
| 2008 | → Noroeste (loan) | 8 | (1) |
| 2009 | → Guarani (loan) | 19 | (2) |
| 2010–2012 | Naft Tehran | 57 | (4) |
| 2012–2013 | Saipa | 10 | (0) |
| 2014 | Nacional MG | 1 | (0) |
| 2014–2015 | Campinense Clube | 2 | (0) |
- * Club domestic league appearances and goals as of 18 Ausgut 2012

Márcio José Narciso (born 21 January 1981), known as Márcio Alemão, is a Brazilian former professional footballer who played as a defender.

== Career ==
In 2009, Márcio Alemão played 17 games for Guarani Futebol Clube, scoring 1 goal. In 2010 he was transferred to Iran Pro League team Naft Tehran, having previously spent all of his career in Brazil.
