= Bargh Shiraz F.C. =

Iranian football club

Bargh Shiraz برق شیراز
- Full name: Bargh Shiraz Football Club
- Nicknames: Orange tulips (Persian: لاله های نارنجی, Lâlahhai-ye Naranji)
- Founded: 15 May 1946; 80 years ago
- Ground: Hafezieh Stadium; Shiraz; Iran
- Capacity: 20,000
- Owner: Ebrahim Gholamzadeh
- Chairman: Abbas Hajizadeh
- Head Coach: Ali Kalantari
- League: League 2 (Iran)
- Website: http://barghshirazfc.com/
Home Kit colours	Away Kit colours

Bargh Shiraz Football Club (Persian: برق شيراز) is an Iranian football club based in Shiraz, Iran. (موسسه فرهنگى ورزشى برق شيراز) Its main sponsor was the municipal electrical company.

== History ==
=== Establishment ===
In 1946, a group of youngsters decided to create a football club. For the first few years the team always had financial problems. For a brief period the club was sponsored by the city council, but after a couple of years the team's current sponsor, Shiraz Electrical Company, came along.

Bargh Shiraz club was documented as the oldest Iranian football club and one of the oldest football clubs in Asia.

=== Success ===
Bargh's success was limited. The club has struggled at times, and over the years has had spells in the lower divisions. The club's highest honor was winning the Hazfi Cup in 1997. They had always been in the mid-table or avoiding relegation in recent years. The 2007–08 season was their best season, as they finished 7th in the league. But they were relegated in the 2008–09 season when they changed coaches three times.

=== Dark years ===
In the 2011–12 Azadegan League season, Bargh experienced a poor season while the organization had a huge conflict over who should take authority over the club (normally, Iranian Ministry of Power and Electricity-Fars). In this year, the club's legal owner organization declined to continue sponsoring the club. Consequently, two volunteer businessmen took responsibility for the football team and brought about the darkest year in the club's history ever. The football team was relegated to the second division. In 2012, the new owner of the club (Hosein Farsi) exchanged the legitimacy of the club with another club (Steel Azin F.C.) in the Azadegan League so the club could again participate in this division. In the same year, the futsal team of the club (Bargh Shiraz FSC) was promoted to the first division, winning the second division's cup.

== Rivalries ==
The Shiraz derby (Persian: شهرآورد شیراز) is a football derby match between the two biggest clubs of Shiraz: Bargh Shiraz and Fajr Sepasi.

== Players ==
=== First-team squad ===
Note: Flags indicate national team as defined under FIFA eligibility rules; some limited exceptions apply. Players may hold more than one non-FIFA nationality.

No.	Pos.	Nation	Player
16	FW	IRN	Mohammad Bakhtiari

== Season-by-season ==
The table below chronicles the achievements of Bargh Shiraz in various competitions:

Season	Division	League	Position	Hazfi Cup
1975–76	1	Takht Jamshid Cup	14th	1/8 Final
1976–77	1	Takht Jamshid Cup	11th	1/8 Final
1977–78	1	Takht Jamshid Cup	7th	Not held
1978–79	1	Takht Jamshid Cup	Did not finish	Not held
1990–91	–	Not held	N/A	1/8 Final
1991–92	2	2nd Division	1st	Not held
1992–93	1	Azadegan League	6th	Not held
1993–94	1	Azadegan League	12th	1/8 Final
1994–95	1	Azadegan League	3rd	1/16 Final
1995–96	1	Azadegan League	6th	Final
1996–97	1	Azadegan League	8th	Cup
1997–98	1	Azadegan League	15th	Not held
1998–99	2	2nd Division	3rd	1/16 Final
1999–00	2	2nd Division	1st	1/16 Final
2000–01	1	Azadegan League	11th	1/8 Final
2001–02	1	Pro League	8th	1/8 Final
2002–03	1	Pro League	10th	
2003–04	1	Pro League	12th	1/8 Final
2004–05	1	Pro League	12th	
2005–06	1	Pro League	14th	1/16 Final
2006–07	1	Pro League	12th	1/8 Final
2007–08	1	Pro League	7th	Semifinal
2008–09	1	Pro League	18th	1/8 Final
2009–10	2	Division 1	3rd	1/8 Final
2010–11	2	Division 1	9th	2nd Round
2011–12	2	Division 1	14th	2nd Round
2012–13	2	Division 1	13th	1/16 Final
2013–14	3	Division 2	12th	Third round
2014–15	4	Division 3	4th (Group B)	Did not qualify
2015–16	4	Division 3	4th (Group C)	Did not qualify
2016–17	4	Division 3	7th (Group C)	Did not qualify
2017–18	–	–	–	–
2018–19	–	–	–	–
2019–20 *	4	Division 3	TBD	Did not qualify

- As "Bargh 3 Faz Shiraz" in replacement of old defunct team.

== Honors ==
=== Domestic titles ===
- Hazfi Cup:
  - Winners (1): 1997
  - Runners-up (1): 1996
- Iran 2nd Division:
  - Winners (2): 1997, 2000

=== International titles ===
- Aga Khan Gold Cup (Note: The competition is widely regarded as the predecessor of AFC Champions League (held for the first time in 1967), since it was the first organized international competition that involved club teams around Asia, organized by the football authorities of East Pakistan, in collaboration with Asian Football Confederation (AFC).)
  - Winners (1): 1970

== Club managers ==
- (Iran) Ebrahim Abbasi
- (Iran) Bizhan Bidari
- (Iran) Karnik Mehrabian
- (Iran) Abbas Razavi
- (Iran) Khalil Salehi Karounian (1975–1976)
- (Iran) Hossein Hosseinzadeh
- (Iran) Mahmoud Yavari (1978)
- (Iran) Fereydoon Asgharzadeh (1995)
- (Iran) Gholam Hossein Peyrovani (1995)
- (Iran) Mahmoud Yavari (1996)
- (Iran) Khalil Salehi Karounian (1996)
- (Bosnia and Herzegovina) Ibrahim Biogradlić (1996)
- (Iran) Hassan Habibi (1997)
- (Iran) Gholam Hossein Peyrovani (1998)
- (Iran) Mohammad Abbasi (1999)
- (Iran) Asghar Sharafi (2000–2001)
- (Iran) Ebrahim Ghasempour (2002)

- (Iran) Mohammad Abbasi (2002–2003)
- (Iran) Mohammad Ahmadzadeh (2003–2004)
- (Iran) Abbas Simakani (2004)
- (Iran) Mahmoud Yavari (2004–2005)
- (Croatia) Zlatko Ivanković (2005–06)
- (Iran) Bijan Zolfagharnasab (2006–2007)
- (Iran) Mahmoud Yavari (2007–2008)
- (Iran) Mohammad Abbasi (2008–2009)
- (Iran) Farshad Pious (2009 – Mar 2009)
- (Iran) Rasoul Korbekandi (March 2009 – June 2009)
- (Iran) Ali Kalantari (July 2009–?)
- (Iran) Mehdi Dinvarzadeh (2010–30 Oct 2010)
- (Iran) Alireza Emamifar (30 Oct 2010–2012)
- (Iran) Mehrdad Shekari (2012)
- (Iran) Asghar Sharafi (2012 – Jan 2013)
- (Iran) Mohammad Abbassi (Jan 2013 – May 2014)
- (Iran) Sattar Zare (May 2014– )
