= Mahmoud Yavari =

Iranian footballer and manager (1939–2020)

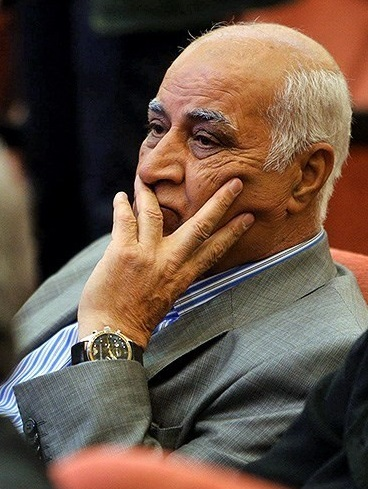

Personal information
- Date of birth: 11 October 1939
- Place of birth: Isfahan, Iran
- Date of death: 10 November 2020 (aged 81)
- Place of death: Isfahan, Iran
- Position: Defender

Youth career
- 1959–1963: Shahin Isfahan

Senior career*
Years	Team	Apps	(Gls)
1962–1964	Shahin Isfahan		
1964–1969	Pas Tehran		

International career
1967–1969	Iran	3	(0)

Managerial career
- 1969–1970: Zob Ahan
- 1970–1978: Sepahan
- 1978: Bargh Shiraz
- 1978–1980: Sepahan
- 1980–1982: Iran U-20
- 1982–1984: Iran U-23
- 1984: Iran
- 1985–1995: Iran U-20
- 1995–1996: Sepahan
- 1996: Bargh Shiraz
- 1998–1999: Fajr Sepasi
- 1999: Pas Tehran
- 2001–2002: Tractor
- 2002–2003: Aboomoslem
- 2004–2005: Bargh Shiraz
- 2005: Esteghlal Ahvaz
- 2007–2008: Bargh Shiraz
- 2008: Esteghlal Ahvaz
- 2008–2009: Rah Ahan
- 2009–2010: Shahin Bushehr
- 2010: Saba
- 2010–2011: Pas Hamedan
- 2011: Steel Azin
- 2011–2013: Fajr Sepasi
- 2013: Zob Ahan
- 2013: Mes Kerman
- 2013–2014: Fajr Sepasi
- * Club domestic league appearances and goals

Mahmoud Yavari (Persian: محمود یاوری, 11 October 1939 – 10 November 2020) was an Iranian football coach and player. He was head coach of the Iran national football team for a short period of time in 1984. He had coached many teams like Zob Ahan, Sepahan, Shahin Bushehr, Tractor, Pas Tehran, Pas Hamedan, Rah Ahan and Fajr Sepasi. He was one of the oldest and most experienced head coaches in Iranian football history.

== Playing career ==
=== Club ===
He began his football at Shahin Isfahan and joined the PAS after the club's establishment and was teammate with Ranjbar and Habibi. He retired and left Pas in 1969.

=== International ===
He was invited to the Iran national football team by Mahmoud Bayati in 1967. He made his debut in a match against Hong Kong on 10 May 1968. He had just three caps with the national team without scoring any goal.

== Coaching career ==
=== Early years ===
After Zob Ahan was established in 1969, Yavari became the club's first ever head coach but because he didn't have any managerial experience, he was sacked in 1970. Then, he was appointed as coach to another Isfahan-based team, Sepahan. He was head coach of Sepahan for eight seasons in his first time in the club. He resigned in 1978 and was quickly appointed as Bargh Shiraz head coach but was sacked in the same year. Sepahan appointed Yavari for a second time and was kept as club head coach until 1980.

=== National team head coach ===
In 1980, he was selected as Iran national under-20 football team head coach. These were successful years for Yavari. After his good results with the under-20 team, he was appointed as coach for the Iran national Olympic team in 1982.

On 7 August 1984, he became head coach of Iran. Along with his assistant, Nasser Ebrahimi, they helped to build a new base for the national team. He led six matches, all of them won, but resigned on 1 December 1984. After his role in the senior team, he returned as the head coach of the under-20 team in 1985 and resigned in 1996.

=== Later career ===
He was Bargh Shiraz head coach in 1996. In 1998, he became Fajr Sepasi head coach but was sacked in 1999. After that, he returned to PAS Tehran as head coach in 1999 but only for a short period. After that, Yavari led many teams.

He was appointed as the head coach of Saba in the summer of 2010 and a few months later was sacked by the club. He was head coach of Steel Azin from April 2011 until May 2011. He was appointed as head coach of Fajr Sepasi on 27 November 2011. He led the club for two seasons and left the club at the end of 2012–13 season. In July 2013, he was named as head coach of Mes Kerman. He resigned as the manager of the club on 14 September 2013 to become head coach of Fajr Sepasi after just four months. After Fajr's relegation, Yavari resigned and retired.

=== Coaching career statistics ===
As of 11 April 2014

Team	From	To	Record				
Team	From	To	G	W	D	L	Win %
Zob Ahan	October 1969	February 1970	2	1	0	1	50
Sepahan	May 1970	October 1978	212	64	72	76	30.19
Bargh Shiraz	October 1978	December 1978	12	4	4	4	33.33
Sepahan	December 1978	June 1980	30	15	5	10	50
Iran U-20	June 1980	June 1982	10	8	2	0	80
Iran U-23	June 1982	August 1984	14	9	4	1	64.29
Iran	August 1984	December 1984	6	6	0	0	100
Iran U-20	October 1995	1996	42	27	10	3	64.29
Bargh Shiraz	1996	1996	4	2	0	2	50
Fajr Sepasi	September 1998	May 1999	30	8	10	12	26.67
PAS Tehran	October 1999	December 1999	7	3	1	3	42.86
Tractor	June 2001	June 2002	26	2	9	15	7.69
Aboomoslem	June 2002	May 2003	26	5	11	10	19.23
Bargh Shiraz	July 2004	January 2005	25	7	10	8	28
Esteghlal Ahvaz	February 2005	June 2005	5	0	3	2	0
Bargh Shiraz	May 2007	April 2008	34	11	14	9	32.35
Rah Ahan	October 2008	April 2009	20	6	8	6	30
Shahin Bushehr	September 2009	May 2010	34	9	12	13	26.47
Saba	June 2010	October 2010	13	4	5	4	30.77
PAS Hamedan	December 2010	March 2011	6	0	2	4	0
Steel Azin	April 2011	May 2011	9	1	2	6	11.11
Fajr Sepasi	November 2011	June 2013	49	17	15	17	34.69
Mes Kerman	July 2013	September 2013	9	0	5	4	0
Fajr Sepasi	September 2013	June 2014	21	5	8	8	23.81
Total			672	217	223	242	32.29
