= List of Zob Ahan F.C. seasons =

This is a list of seasons played by Zob Ahan Football Club in Iranian and Asian football, from 1973 to the most recent completed season. It details the club's achievements in major competitions, and the top scorers for each season. Top scorers in bold were also the top scorers in the Iranian league that season.

== Seasons ==
Season	League									Hazfi Cup	Asia	Leagues Top goalscorer		Manager
Season	Division	P	W	D	L	F	A	Pts	Pos	Hazfi Cup	Asia	Name	Goals	Manager
1973-74	TJC	22	4	7	11	25	35	15	10th	**Not held**				Arabzadeh
1974-75	TJC	22	4	5	13	14	35	13	11th	**Not held**				Lyadin
1975-76	TJC	30	6	15	9	16	23	27	9th	1/8 Final				Lyadin
1976-77	TJC	30	4	15	11	21	35	23	15th	1/16 Final				Lyadin
1977-78	TJC	30	11	10	9	31	30	32	8th	**Not held**				Lyadin
1978–79	TJC	12	4	3	5			11	Did not finish	**Not held**				Korbekandi
1981-82	I2D								**1st**	**Not held**				Korbekandi
1983-84	IL								3rd	**Not held**				F.Moeini
1984-85	IL								2nd	**Not held**				F.Moeini
1991-92	IL								5th					F.Moeini
1993–94	Div 1	26	9	11	6	37	29	29	4th	1/8 Final				Lyadin
1994–95	Div 1	22	6	11	5	31	34	24	8th	1/16 Final				Lyadin
1995–96	Div 2	16	9	4	3	26	13	31	2nd	1/8 Final				
1996–97	Div 1	30	7	16	7	30	28	37	10th	1/8 Final				
1997–98	Div 1	28	11	12	5	31	30	45	3rd	**Not held**				
1998–99	Div 1	30	9	6	15	23	32	33	12th	Third round				Hejazi
1999–2000	Div 1	26	11	6	9	35	29	39	5th	First round		Reza Sahebi	10	Hejazi
2000–01	Div 1	22	7	9	6	30	22	30	4th	Final	Esteghlal Time	Reza Sahebi	14	Hejazi
2001–02	IPL	26	10	9	7	30	25	39	6th	Quarterfinal	Taji time	Reza Sahebi	7	Atef
2002–03	IPL	26	10	4	12	22	29	34	8th	**Champion**	Taj	Reza Sahebi	6	Darbinyan
2003–04	IPL	26	11	7	8	32	25	40	4th	Semi-Final	Group stage	Mehdi Rajabzadeh	9	Korbekandi
2004–05	IPL	30	17	7	6	38	19	58	2nd	1/8 Final	Did not qualify	Mehdi Rajabzadeh	8	Korbekandi
2005–06	IPL	30	12	10	8	41	30	45	6th	1/8 Final	Did not qualify	Mehdi Rajabzadeh	14	Korbekandi
2006–07	IPL	30	10	9	11	39	42	39	8th	1/16 Final	Did not qualify	**Mehdi Rajabzadeh**	17	Korbekandi
2007-08	IPL	34	11	15	8	39	32	48	6th	1/8 Final	Did not qualify	Esmaeil Farhadi	9	Đorđević/ Zolfagharnasab
2008-09	IPL	34	19	9	6	58	42	66	**2nd**	**Champion**	Did not qualify	(Brazil) Igor Castro	16	Ebrahimzadeh
2009-10	IPL	34	16	13	5	48	29	61	**2nd**	Semi-Final	Final	M.R.Khalatbari	**11**	Ebrahimzadeh
2010-11	IPL	34	18	9	7	49	31	63	3rd	1/16 Final	1/4 Final	Mohammad Hosseini	12	Ebrahimzadeh
2011-12	IPL	34	9	18	7	29	33	45	6th	1/8 Final	Play-Off	Mohammad Ghazi	7	Ebrahimzadeh
2012-13	IPL	34	9	11	14	36	40	38	14th	1/4 Final	Did not qualify	Mehdi Rajabzadeh	8	Korbekandi/ Kazemi/ Yavari
2013-14	IPL	30	6	11	13	24	36	29	13th	1/4 Final	Did not qualify	Mehdi Rajabzadeh	9	Bonačić/ Taghavi/ Karimi
2014-15	IPL	30	14	10	6	46	26	52	4th	**Champion**	Did not qualify	Masoud Hassanzadeh	9	Golmohammadi
2015-16	IPL	30	11	13	6	38	26	46	6th	**Champion**	1/8 Final	Morteza Tabrizi	7	Golmohammadi
2016-17	IPL	30	12	10	8	39	31	46	4th	Semi Final	First round	Morteza Tabrizi	11	Golmohammadi/ Hosseini
2017-18	IPL	30	15	10	5	46	30	55	**2nd**	1/16 Final	1/8 Final	Morteza Tabrizi	13	Ghalenoei
**Total (Iran Pro League)**		**522**	**210**	**175**	**137**	**654**	**525**	**804**						

=== Key ===
- P = Played
- W = Games won
- D = Games drawn
- L = Games lost
- F = Goals for
- A = Goals against
- Pts = Points
- Pos = Final position
- CWC = Asian Cup Winners Cup
- ACL = AFC Champions League
- LL = Local League
- TJC = Takht Jamshid Cup
- IL = Isfahan League
- QL = Qods League
- Div 1 = Azadegan League
- IPL = Iran Pro League

Champions	Runners-up	3rd place	Promoted	Relegated

== See also ==
- Zob Ahan Esfahan F.C.
- Takht Jamshid Cup
- Azadegan League
- Iran Pro League
- Hazfi Cup
