= List of Zob Ahan F.C. managers =

The following is a list of managers of Zob Ahan Football Club and their major honours from the beginning of the club's official managerial records from 1969 to the present day. The first manager of the club was Mahmoud Yavari. Currently, Mehdi Tartar is the head coach.

== List of managers (1969–present) ==
- (Iran) Mahmoud Yavari (1969–70)
- (Iran) Aziz Asli (1970–71)
- (Iran) Bahram Atef (1971)
- (Iran) Mohsen Hajnasrollah (1971–73)
- (Iran) Mahmoud Arabzadeh (1973–74)
- (Soviet Union) Yevgeny Lyadin (1974–78)
- (Iran) Rasoul Korbekandi (1978–83)
- (Iran) Fereydoon Moeini (1983–93)
- (Russia) Yevgeny Lyadin (1993–95)
- (Iran) Nasser Hejazi (1998–01)
- (Iran) Bahram Atef (2001–02)
- (Armenia) Samvel Darbinyan (2002–03)
- (Iran) Rasoul Korbekandi (2003–07)
- (Serbia) Zoran Đorđević (June 2007–October 07)
- (Iran) Bijan Zolfagharnasab (2007–08)
- (Iran) Mansour Ebrahimzadeh (July 1, 2008–June 30, 2012)
- (Iran) Rasoul Korbekandi (June 1, 2012–October 5, 2012)
- (Iran) Farhad Kazemi (October 5, 2012–13)
- (Iran) Mahmoud Yavari (June 10, 2013-July 2, 2013)
- (Croatia) Luka Bonačić (July 2, 2013–January 1, 2014)
- (Iran) Mojtaba Taghavi (January 1, 2014–February 21, 2014)
- (Iran) Firouz Karimi (February 21, 2014–May 10, 2014)
- (Iran) Yahya Golmohammadi (May 10, 2014–September 24, 2016)
- (Iran) Mojtaba Hosseini (September 24, 2016–June 10, 2017)
- (Iran) Amir Ghalenoei (June 10, 2017–June 1, 2018)
- (United States) Omid Namazi (June 1, 2018–November 145, 2018)
- (Iran) Alireza Mansourian (November 15, 2018–December 18, 2019)
- (Montenegro) Miodrag Radulović (January 14, 2020–June 14, 2020)
- (Croatia) Luka Bonačić (June 16, 2020–August 20, 2020)
- (Iran) Rahman Rezaei (September 1, 2020–February 25, 2021)
- (Iran) Mojtaba Hosseini (March 2, 2020–August 1, 2021)
- (Iran) Mehdi Tartar (August 10, 2021–June 10, 2023)
- (Iran) Mohammad Rabiei (June 25, 2023–May 17, 2025)
- (Iran) Ghasem Hadadifar (May 17, 2025–January 28, 2026)
- (Iran) Jalal Omidian (January 28, 2026–present)

== See also ==
- Zob Ahan F.C.
