= List of Zob Ahan F.C. players =

This is a list of notable players who have played for Zob Ahan Football Club by decade.

== List of players ==
Name	Position	Zob Ahan career	Apps in PL	Goals in PL	Appearances	Goals	Notes
(Iran) Rasoul Korbekandi	Goalkeeper	1969–1980					
(Iran) Mahmood Ebrahimzadeh	Forward	1976–1986					
(Iran) Reza Sahebi	Forward	1997–2003		49			
(Iran) Ali Akbar Ostad-Asadi	Defender	1995–2003					
(Iran) Rahman Rezaei	Defender	1996–2001					
(Iran) Ebrahim Taghipour	Defender	2000–2005					
(Iran) Sepehr Heidari	Defender	2000–2007, 2012–2014	175	13			
(Iran) Amir Vaziri	Forward	2001–2004		15			
(Moldova) Sergiu Chirilov	Forward	2003–2004	14	0			
(Moldova) Gheorghe Stratulat	Midfielder	2003–2007	115	7			
(Iran) Mehdi Rajabzadeh	Forward	2003–07, 2010–11, 2012–18	296	93	^{[A]}		
(Armenia) Armenak Petrosyan	Goalkeeper	2003–2005	72	0			
(Iran) Farshad Bahadorani	Defender	2003–2006, 2012–2014		4			
(Iran) Ghasem Haddadifar	Midfielder	2003–	305	14	376	19	
(Iran) Faraz Fatemi	Forward	2004–2006	45	7			
(Iran) Mostafa Salehinejad	Defender	2004–2010	124	5			
(Iran) Mohammad Mansouri	Midfielder	2004–2010	155	8			
(Iran) Mohammad Salsali	Defender	2004–2014	220	11			
(Armenia) Levon Stepanyan	Midfielder	2005–2006	11	0			
(Senegal) Issa Ndoye	Goalkeeper	2005–2009	60	0			
(Iran) Hassan Ashjari	Midfielder	2005–2010	139	2			
(Iran) Esmaeil Farhadi	Forward	2005–2015	280	44	308	47	
(Iran) Keivan Amraei	Forward	2006–2010	70	14	73	14	
(Iran) Mohammad Reza Khalatbari	Forward	2006–2011, 2019–	129	34	157	43	
(Iran) Mohammad-Ali Ahmadi	Defender	2006–2012	124	6			
(Iran) Farshid Talebi	Defender	2006–2012	138	12	167	12	
(Iran) Mohsen Mosalman	Midfielder	2007–2015, 2018	137	18	153	18	
(Brazil) Igor Castro	Forward	2008–2012	121	30	153	40	
(Iran) Seyed Mohammad Hosseini	Defender	2008–2012	97	23	117	25	
(Iran) Sina Ashouri	Midfielder	2008–2016	131	5	152	5	
(Iran) Shahab Gordan	Goalkeeper	2009–2012	85	0	102	0	
(Iran) Mohammad Ghazi	Forward	2009–2012	83	16	111	27	
(Iran) Payam Sadeghian	Midfielder	2009–2013	61	6	67	6	
(Iran) Hossein Mahini	Defender	2010–2012	61	3	85	3	
(Brazil) Felipe Alves	Midfielder	2011–2012	28	1	29	1	
(Iran) Davoud Haghi	Midfielder	2011–2012	30	0	31	0	
(Portugal) Hugo Machado	Midfielder	2011–2013	27	3	28	3	
(Iraq) Hawar Mulla Mohammed	Midfielder	2011–2012	12	1	12	1	
(North Macedonia) Aco Stojkov	Forward	2012	5	1	5	1	
(Armenia) Gevorg Kasparov	Goalkeeper	2012–2014	22	0	24	0	
(Brazil) Carlos Santos	Defender	2013-2015	43	3	49	4	
(Iran) Morteza Tabrizi	Midfielder	2013–2018	138	39	180	53	
(Iran) Ehsan Pahlavan	Midfielder	2013–	108	8	131	13	
(Iran) Mehrdad Ghanbari	Defender	2014–2017	53	3	61	3	
(Iran) Mohammad Rashid Mazaheri	Goalkeeper	2014–2019	131	0	176	0	
(Lebanon) Ali Hamam	Defender	2014–2018	81	4	108	4	
(Lebanon) Walid Ismail	Defender	2014–2015	23	0	31	0	
(Iran) Masoud Hassanzadeh	Forward	2014–2016	43	15	55	17	
(Iran) Danial Esmaeilifar	Midfielder	2014–	81	5	104	6	
(Iran) Mehdi Mehdipour	Midfielder	2014–	72	2	106	2	
(Iran) Hadi Mohammadi	Defender	2014–	71	5	93	5	
(Iran) Kaveh Rezaei	Forward	2015–2016	34	11	45	14	
(Iran) Mohammad Reza Hosseini	Midfielder	2015–2019	96	12	133	14	
(Iran) Mohammad Nejad Mehdi	Defender	2015–	95	3	128	7	
(Iran) Vahid Mohammadzadeh	Defender	2016–	99	2	125	5	
(Lebanon) Rabih Ataya	Midfielder	2017–2018	29	1			
(Lebanon) Mehdi Khalil	Goalkeeper	2020–	0	0	0	0	

== Notes ==
A. Mehdi Rajabzadeh is top goal scorer of 2006–07 with 17 goals.
