= Ebrahimzadeh =

Ebrahimzadeh is a surname of Iranian origins. It may refer to:

- Amir Ebrahimzadeh (born 2004), Iranian football forward
- Benjamin Ebrahimzadeh (born 1980), Iranian-German tennis player
- Mahmood Ebrahimzadeh (born 1957), Iranian retired footballer and football coach
- Mansour Ebrahimzadeh (born 1956), Iranian retired football player, and former manager of Sepahan S.C.
- Masoud Ebrahimzadeh (born 1989), Iranian football player
- Mohsen Ebrahimzadeh (born 1987), Iranian pop singer and musician
- Shahin Ebrahimzadeh-Pezeshki (born 1958), Iranian textile artist, researcher, art historian, educator
