= 2009–10 Persian Gulf Cup =

9th season of Persian Gulf Pro League

Persian Gulf Cup
- Season: 2009–10
- Champions: Sepahan; 2nd Pro League title 2nd Iranian title
- Relegated: Moghavemat Shiraz; Aboumoslem; Esteghlal Ahvaz
- Champions League: Sepahan; Zob Ahan; Esteghlal; Persepolis (Hazfi Cup champions)
- Matches: 306
- Goals: 782 (2.56 per match)
- Top goalscorer: Emad Mohammed (19 goals)
- Biggest home win: Paykan 4–0 Malavan (21 August 2009); Moghavemat 4–0 Malavan (7 September 2009); Saba Qom 4–0 Shahin Bushehr (6 October 2009); Foolad 4–0 Rah Ahan (4 December 2009)
- Biggest away win: Aboumoslem 0–5 Esteghlal (24 September 2009); Est. Ahvaz 0–5 Sepahan (22 December 2009)
- Highest scoring: Mes Kerman 2–6 Steel Azin (7 November 2009); Est. Ahvaz 4–4 Saipa (2 May 2010)
- Longest winning run: 8 matches Sepahan
- Longest unbeaten run: 13 matches Sepahan
- Longest winless run: 16 matches Aboumoslem
- Longest losing run: 6 matches Est. Ahvaz
- Highest attendance: 95,000; Tractor Sazi – Moghavemat (22 January 2010)
- Lowest attendance: 0 (spectator ban); Esteghlal – Sepahan (7 August 2009); Persepolis – Est. Ahvaz (14 August 2009); Paykan – Foolad (11 December 2009); Aboumoslem – Tractor Sazi (4 April 2010)
- Total attendance: 3,714,000
- Average attendance: 12,298

The 2009–10 Persian Gulf Cup (also known as Iran Pro League) was the 27th season of Iran's Football League and ninth as Iran Pro League since its establishment in 2001. Esteghlal were the defending champions. The season featured 15 teams from the 2008–09 Persian Gulf Cup and three new teams promoted from the 2008–09 Azadegan League: Steel Azin and Tractor Sazi both as champions and Shahin Bushehr. The league started on 6 August 2009 and ended on 19 May 2010. Sepahan won the Pro League title for the second time in their history (total second Iranian title). Sepahan's Emad Mohammed emerged as the top goalscorer, with 19 goals.

== Team information ==
=== Stadia and locations ===
Locations of clubs in 2009–10 Persian Gulf Cup

Team	City	Venue	Capacity
Aboomoslem	Mashhad	Samen Al-Aeme	35,000
Est. Ahvaz	Ahvaz	Takhti Ahvaz	30,000
Esteghlal	Tehran	Azadi	90,000
Foolad	Ahvaz	Takhti Ahvaz	30,000
Malavan	Anzali	Takhti Anzali	8,000
Mes Kerman	Kerman	Shahid Bahonar	15,000
Moghavemat	Shiraz	Hafezieh	20,000
PAS Hamedan	Hamedan	Shahid Mofatteh	15,000
Paykan	Qazvin	Shahid Rajaei	5,000
Persepolis	Tehran	Azadi	90,000
Rah Ahan	Shahr-e-Rey	Rah Ahan	15,000
Saba Qom	Qom	Yadegar Emam Qom	15,000
Saipa	Karaj	Enghelab Karaj	15,000
Sepahan	Esfahan	Foolad Shahr	20,000
Shahin	Bushehr	Shahid Beheshti	15,000
Steel Azin	Tehran	Shahid Dastgerdi	5,000
Tractor Sazi	Tabriz	Yadegar Emam Tabriz	70,000
Zob Ahan	Esfahan	Foolad Shahr	20,000

=== Personnel and sponsoring ===
Team	End-season head coach	Team captain	Kit maker	Shirt sponsor	Past Season
Aboomoslem	(Iran) Ali Hanteh	(Iran) Saeed Khani	Merooj	City Credit Cooperative	15th
Est. Ahvaz	(Iran) Ali Firouzi	(Iran) Afshin Komaei	Merooj	Samsung	14th
Esteghlal	(Iran) Samad Marfavi	(Iran) Farhad Majidi	Uhlsport	Iran Furniture Market	Champion
Foolad	(Iran) Majid Jalali	(Iran) Jalal Kameli Mofrad	Daei SWE		7th
Malavan	(Iran) Farhad Pourgholami	(Iran) Pejman Nouri	Daei SWE	Anzali Free Zone	12th
Mes Kerman	(Croatia) Luka Bonačić	(Iran) Abbas Mohammadi	Merooj	Mahan Air	3rd
Moghavemat	(Iran) Mohammad Ahmadzadeh	(Iran) Mostafa Sabri	Merooj		9th
Pas Hamedan	(Iran) Ali Asghar Modir Roosta	(Iran) Yadollah Akbari	Merooj	Achilan Door	13th
Paykan	(Iran) Hamid Derakhshan	(Iran) Mohammad Reza Tahmasebi	JEJ	Liugong	8th
Persepolis	(Iran) Ali Daei	(Iran) Karim Bagheri	Uhlsport	Tehran Municipality	5th
Rah Ahan	(Iran) Mehdi Tartar	(Iran) Alireza Noormohammadi	JEJ	RAJA	11th
Saba Qom	(Iran) Rasoul Korbekandi	(Iran) Morteza Assadi	Daei SWE	Salafchegan Special Economic Zone	6th
Saipa	(Iran) Mohammad Mayeli Kohan	(Iran) Ebrahim Sadeghi	Nahangi	Saipa	10th
Sepahan	(Iran) Amir Ghalenoei	(Iran) Moharram Navidkia	Lotto	Taban Air	4th
Shahin	(Iran) Mahmoud Yavari	(Iran) Reza Baziari	Nahangi	Haffar Machine Co.	Promoted
Steel Azin	(Iran) Afshin Peyrovani	(Iran) Ali Karimi	Merooj	Razi Insurance	Promoted
Tractor Sazi	(Iran) Faraz Kamalvand	(Iran) Mohammad Nosrati	Daei SWE		Promoted
Zob Ahan	(Iran) Mansour Ebrahimzadeh	(Iran) Mostafa Salehi Nejad	Merooj		2nd

== Managerial changes ==
Team	Outgoing manager	Manner of departure	Date of vacancy	Replaced by	Date of appointment
Shahin Bushehr	(Iran) Hamid Kolali Fard	Sacked	6 Sep 2009	(Iran) Mahmoud Yavari	8 Sep 2009
Est.Ahvaz	(Iran) Khodadad Azizi	Resigned	19 Sep 2009	(Iran) Majid Bagherinia	20 Sep 2009
Foolad	(Croatia) Luka Bonačić	Sacked	28 Sep 2009	(Iran) Majid Jalali	28 Sep 2009
Pas Hamedan	(Iran) Alireza Mansourian	Resigned	6 Oct 2009	(Iran) Ali Asghar Modir Roosta	8 Oct 2009
Aboomoslem	(Iran) Nasser Pourmehdi	Sacked	29 Oct 2009	(Iran) Farhad Kazemi	29 Oct 2009
Saba Qom	(Iran) Mohammad Hossein Ziaei	Resigned	9 Nov 2009	(Iran) Rasoul Korbekandi	9 Nov 2009
Mes Kerman	(Iran) Parviz Mazloomi	Sacked	30 Nov 2009	(Croatia) Luka Bonačić	9 Dec 2009
Rah Ahan	(Netherlands) Ernie Brandts	Sacked	12 Dec 2009	(Iran) Mehdi Tartar	12 Dec 2009
Malavan	(Iran) Mohammad Ahmadzadeh	Sacked	23 Dec 2009	(Iran) Farhad Pourgholami	27 Dec 2009
Aboomoslem	(Iran) Farhad Kazemi	Resigned	24 Dec 2009	(Iran) Parviz Mazloomi	27 Dec 2009
Persepolis	(Croatia) Zlatko Kranjčar	Sacked	28 Dec 2009	(Iran) Ali Daei	28 Dec 2009
Est.Ahvaz	(Iran) Majid Bagherinia	Sacked	22 Jan 2010	(Iran) Mohammad Ahmadzadeh	5 Feb 2010
Est.Ahvaz	(Iran) Mohammad Ahmadzadeh	Resigned	9 Feb 2010	(Iran) Mehdi Hasheminasab	17 Feb 2010
Moghavemat	(Iran) Davoud Mahabadi	Resigned	26 Feb 2010	(Iran) Mohammad Ahmadzadeh	1 Mar 2010
Aboomoslem	(Iran) Parviz Mazloomi	Resigned	Mar2010	(Iran) Ali Hanteh	Mar 2010
Est.Ahvaz	(Iran) Mehdi Hasheminasab	Resigned	Apr 2010	(Iran) Ali Firouzi	Apr 2010
Steel Azin	(Iran) Hamid Estili	Sacked	19 Apr 2010	(Iran) Afshin Peyrovani	19 Apr 2010

== League table ==
Pos	Team	Pld	W	D	L	GF	GA	GD	Pts	Qualification or relegation
1	Sepahan (C)	34	19	10	5	67	30	+37	67	Qualification for the 2011 AFC Champions League
2	Zob Ahan	34	16	13	5	48	29	+19	61	Qualification for the 2011 AFC Champions League
3	Esteghlal	34	16	11	7	49	32	+17	59	Qualification for the 2011 AFC Champions League
4	Persepolis	34	13	14	7	46	40	+6	53	Qualification for the 2011 AFC Champions League
5	Steel Azin	34	13	13	8	55	49	+6	52	
6	Saba	34	13	9	12	52	45	+7	48	
7	Tractor Sazi	34	11	14	9	43	42	+1	47	
8	Saipa	34	12	10	12	48	53	−5	46	
9	Mes	34	11	9	14	55	56	−1	42	
10	Foolad	34	9	15	10	31	34	−3	42	
11	Paykan	34	9	14	11	40	44	−4	41	
12	Malavan	34	10	11	13	31	47	−16	41	
13	Shahin B.	34	9	12	13	37	37	0	39	
14	Rah Ahan	34	9	11	14	36	44	−8	38	
15	Pas Hamedan	34	9	11	14	36	44	−8	38	
16	Fajr (R)	34	8	13	13	34	45	−11	37	Relegation to the 2010–11 Azadegan League
17	Aboumoslem (R)	34	7	11	16	36	51	−15	32	Relegation to the 2010–11 Azadegan League
18	Est. Ahvaz (R)	34	7	9	18	38	60	−22	30	Relegation to the 2010–11 Azadegan League

Updated to match(es) played on 01 SEP 2018. Source: IPL Stats, Soccerway
Rules for classification: 1) Points; 2) Goal difference; 3) Goals scored.
(C) Champions; (R) Relegated

== Positions by round ==
Team ╲ Round	1	2	3	4	5	6	7	8	9	10	11	12	13	14	15	16	17	18	19	20	21	22	23	24	25	26	27	28	29	30	31	32	33	34
Sepahan	15	6	12	8	7	5	6	5	5	4	4	2	3	1	1	1	1	1	1	1	1	1	1	1	1	1	1	1	1	1	1	1	1	1
Zob Ahan	1	2	1	1	2	4	3	3	3	3	3	4	4	3	3	2	2	2	2	2	2	2	2	2	2	2	2	2	2	2	2	2	3	2
Esteghlal	6	5	3	5	3	3	2	2	2	1	1	1	1	2	2	3	4	7	3	5	5	4	4	3	3	4	4	4	4	4	3	3	2	3
Persepolis	8	10	7	4	6	7	7	8	8	6	7	7	6	6	7	5	7	4	5	3	3	3	5	4	4	3	3	3	3	3	4	4	4	4
Steel Azin	2	1	4	2	5	8	9	10	6	8	8	8	8	7	5	4	6	5	7	7	7	5	3	5	5	5	5	5	5	5	5	5	5	5
Saba Qom	5	7	5	9	10	9	5	7	11	7	5	5	7	8	10	11	11	12	11	11	11	10	10	10	10	9	8	8	8	7	6	6	6	6
Tractor Sazi	13	14	10	7	8	10	10	6	7	10	11	12	10	12	11	9	8	8	9	8	8	7	6	6	7	6	6	6	6	6	7	7	7	7
Saipa	18	9	6	10	11	12	12	11	10	9	9	9	11	13	13	14	12	11	12	12	12	11	11	11	12	14	12	13	11	9	8	8	8	8
Mes Kerman	7	18	18	13	9	6	8	9	9	11	12	10	12	9	12	12	13	13	14	14	14	15	15	13	15	16	16	16	14	13	15	12	12	9
Foolad	14	13	15	16	17	17	16	17	18	17	16	18	16	18	16	17	17	17	17	17	17	16	17	16	17	15	13	14	15	14	11	11	13	10
Paykan	17	16	9	6	4	1	1	1	1	2	2	3	2	4	4	6	3	6	6	4	4	6	7	7	8	8	7	7	7	8	9	10	10	11
Malavan	12	4	11	12	13	11	11	12	13	13	10	11	9	11	9	8	10	9	8	9	9	8	8	8	6	7	9	9	9	10	10	9	9	12
Shahin Bushehr	11	15	16	17	18	18	13	13	12	14	14	15	14	14	14	15	15	14	13	13	13	14	13	15	14	12	14	15	16	16	12	15	11	13
PAS Hamedan	16	17	17	18	15	16	18	16	16	18	17	16	17	16	17	16	16	16	15	15	15	13	14	12	11	11	11	11	13	11	13	13	15	14
Rah Ahan	4	8	13	14	14	13	14	14	14	12	14	13	15	15	15	13	14	15	16	16	16	17	16	17	16	13	15	12	12	15	16	14	14	14
Moghavemat	3	3	2	3	1	2	4	4	4	5	6	6	5	5	6	7	5	3	4	6	6	9	9	9	9	10	10	10	10	12	14	16	16	16
Aboumoslem	9	12	14	15	16	15	17	18	17	16	18	17	18	17	18	18	18	18	18	18	18	18	18	18	18	18	18	18	18	18	17	18	17	17
Est. Ahvaz	10	11	8	11	12	14	15	15	15	15	13	14	13	10	8	10	9	10	10	10	10	12	12	14	13	17	17	17	17	17	18	17	18	18

Leader
AFC Champions League 2011 Group stage
Relegation to 2010–11 Azadegan League

Source: cups.ir (in Persian)

== Results ==
Home \ Away	SEP	ZOB	EST	PRS	STL	SAB	TRK	SAP	MES	FOL	PAY	MLV	SHB	RAH	PAS	MVT	ABU	ESA
Sepahan		0–1	2–0	2–1	0–1	3–1	3–1	5–1	3–0	1–1	2–1	2–0	2–0	2–0	3–1	5–1	2–0	4–1
Zob Ahan	0–0		1–0	1–1	3–1	2–1	1–0	3–0	0–0	1–0	2–2	3–0	1–0	1–2	0–1	2–0	3–1	5–2
Esteghlal	1–0	1–0		1–1	2–0	1–1	2–2	2–1	2–0	1–0	2–3	2–2	2–1	1–0	1–0	3–2	3–1	2–3
Persepolis	1–1	1–1	2–1		0–0	1–0	2–1	0–2	2–0	1–0	1–2	1–1	2–2	1–0	1–0	4–2	2–1	1–1
Steel Azin	2–1	2–2	0–2	2–1		4–3	2–2	4–3	1–1	2–3	0–1	2–2	2–1	1–1	2–2	1–1	0–0	0–1
Saba Qom	2–2	1–1	2–1	1–1	4–2		2–1	2–2	1–3	1–1	0–0	0–1	4–0	0–1	2–1	1–2	2–1	2–0
Tractor Sazi	1–1	0–0	1–1	1–1	2–1	3–1		1–2	1–0	1–0	1–0	2–1	1–1	2–1	2–2	0–0	1–0	2–1
Saipa	2–2	2–1	1–1	0–2	2–2	2–0	1–0		2–1	1–2	0–2	3–1	1–0	2–1	3–0	1–1	1–0	2–4
Mes Kerman	2–3	5–2	1–2	3–3	2–6	0–0	3–2	3–2		2–0	3–3	4–2	1–0	2–2	3–2	0–0	5–2	2–0
Foolad	0–0	1–1	1–1	0–0	0–1	2–1	1–1	1–1	0–4		1–1	0–0	0–0	4–0	3–2	1–1	1–0	1–1
Paykan	1–4	1–1	1–1	1–3	0–1	1–1	1–0	1–1	0–0	1–1		4–0	0–2	1–1	2–2	0–2	2–0	3–1
Malavan	0–0	0–1	0–0	1–1	1–3	1–3	1–1	1–0	2–1	1–0	0–1		0–0	2–1	1–0	1–0	3–1	1–0
Shahin Bushehr	1–2	1–1	0–1	4–1	1–2	0–1	2–4	2–0	4–1	0–1	0–0	1–1		3–1	1–1 (Note: PAS Hamedan received a technical loss of 3–0 to Shahin Bushehr. The original game was finished in a 1–1 draw.)	0–0	1–1	0–0
Rah Ahan	0–1	0–0	3–2	2–2	1–1	1–3	0–0	0–1	3–2	2–1	3–0	1–2	1–2		0–0	0–0	1–0	1–1
PAS Hamedan	1–1	1–1	0–0	1–2	0–2	2–1	1–1	3–1	1–0	3–1	2–2	1–1	0–1	0–1		3–1	1–0	2–1
Moghavemat	3–1	0–2	0–0	1–2	1–2	1–4	2–2	0–0	1–1	0–1	1–0	4–0	0–1	2–1	1–0		1–1	3–2
Aboumoslem	2–2	1–2	0–5	3–1	2–2	1–3	3–0	1–1	1–0	1–1	2–1	2–1	1–1	1–1	0–0	3–0		2–0
Est. Ahvaz	0–5	1–2	0–2	1–0	1–1	0–1	2–3	4–4	1–0	0–1	3–1	2–0	2–2	1–3	0–1	0–0	1–1	

Updated to match(es) played on 20 May 2010. Source: IPL Stats
Legend: Blue = home team win; Yellow = draw; Red = away team win.

== Clubs season-progress ==
Team ╲ Round	1	2	3	4	5	6	7	8	9	10	11	12	13	14	15	16	17	18	19	20	21	22	23	24	25	26	27	28	29	30	31	32	33	34
Sepahan	L	W	L	W	D	W	D	W	D	D	W	W	L	W	W	W	W	W	W	W	W	D	D	W	D	W	L	D	W	L	W	D	W	D
Zob Ahan	W	D	W	W	D	L	W	D	W	D	D	L	D	W	W	W	W	L	W	D	W	D	D	W	L	D	W	W	D	D	L	W	D	W
Esteghlal	W	D	W	D	W	D	W	W	D	W	L	D	D	L	W	L	L	L	W	D	D	D	D	W	W	L	W	W	W	L	W	W	W	D
Persepolis	D	D	W	W	D	D	D	L	D	W	D	D	W	W	L	W	L	W	L	W	D	D	L	W	W	W	W	W	D	L	D	D	L	D
Steel Azin	W	W	L	W	D	L	L	D	W	D	D	D	W	D	W	W	L	D	L	D	W	D	W	L	W	L	W	W	L	W	D	D	D	D
Saba Qom	W	L	W	L	L	W	W	L	L	W	W	D	D	L	L	L	L	L	W	W	D	D	W	L	D	D	W	L	D	W	W	D	W	D
Tractor Sazi	L	D	W	W	L	D	D	W	D	L	L	D	W	L	W	W	D	W	L	D	D	W	D	D	D	W	L	D	W	L	D	L	W	D
Saipa	L	W	W	L	L	D	D	W	D	W	D	D	L	L	L	L	W	W	L	W	D	D	D	L	L	L	W	L	W	W	W	D	W	D
Mes Kerman	D	L	L	W	W	W	L	D	D	L	D	W	L	W	L	L	L	L	L	W	L	D	D	W	L	D	L	D	W	W	L	W	D	W
Foolad	L	D	L	D	D	L	D	L	L	D	D	L	D	L	W	L	D	W	D	D	W	D	D	W	D	W	W	L	L	W	W	D	D	W
Paykan	L	D	W	W	W	W	W	W	D	L	D	D	D	D	D	L	W	L	D	W	D	L	L	L	L	D	W	D	D	D	L	L	L	D
Malavan	D	W	L	D	L	W	D	L	D	D	W	D	W	L	W	W	L	D	W	L	D	W	D	L	W	L	L	L	D	L	W	D	L	L
Shahin Bushehr	D	L	L	L	D	D	W	D	W	L	D	L	W	D	L	D	D	D	W	D	L	D	W	L	D	W	L	L	L	W	W	L	W	L
PAS Hamedan	L	D	L	L	W	L	L	D	L	L	D	D	L	W	D	W	L	D	W	L	W	W	D	W	W	L	D	D	L	W	L	D	L	D
Rah Ahan	W	L	L	L	D	D	D	D	D	W	L	W	L	L	D	W	L	L	L	L	D	D	W	L	W	W	D	W	D	L	L	W	L	D
Moghavemat	W	D	W	D	W	D	D	D	D	L	D	D	W	W	L	D	W	W	L	L	L	L	D	D	L	L	L	D	W	L	L	L	L	D
Aboumoslem	D	D	L	L	D	D	L	L	D	D	L	D	L	D	L	L	W	W	L	L	L	D	L	W	L	W	L	W	L	W	D	D	W	L
Est. Ahvaz	D	D	W	L	L	L	L	D	D	W	W	D	D	W	W	L	W	L	W	L	L	L	L	L	D	L	L	L	L	L	L	D	L	D

Source: IPL Stats
W = Win; D = Draw; L = Lose

== Statistics ==
=== Top goalscorers ===
Rank	Player	Club	Goals
1	(Iraq) Emad Mohammed	Sepahan	19
2	(Senegal) Ibrahima Touré	Sepahan	18
3	(Brazil) Edinho	Mes	14
3	(Iran) Ali Karimi	Steel Azin	14
5	(Iran) Karim Ansarifard	Saipa	13
5	(Iran) Davoud Haghi	Saba Qom	13
7	(Iran) Amin Manouchehri	Saipa	12
8	(Iran) Arash Borhani	Esteghlal	11
8	(Iran) Mohammad Reza Khalatbari	Zob Ahan	11
10	(Iran) Hadi Asghari	PAS Hamedan	10
10	(Iran) Karim Bagheri	Persepolis	10
10	(Iran) Mohammad Ebrahimi	Teraktor Sazi	10
10	(Iran) Mohammad Gholami	Steel Azin	10
10	(Iran) Farhad Kheirkhah	Teraktor Sazi	10
10	(Iran) Farhad Majidi	Esteghlal	10
10	(Iran) Mehdi Rajabzadeh	Mes	10
10	(Iran) Milad Zanidpour	Rah Ahan	10
18	3 players		9
21	2 players		8
23	8 players		7
31	8 players		6
39	13 players		5
52	21 players		4
73	35 players		3
108	39 players		2
147	82 players		1
_	13 players		OG
_	technical loses of 3–0		Once
Total goals (Including technical loses)			782
Total games			306
Average per game			2.56

Last updated: May 26, 2010
Source: iplstats.com/scorers

=== Top Assistants ===
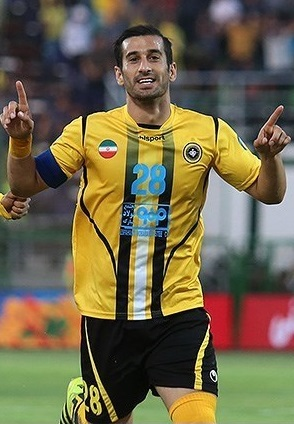
Ehsan Hajsafi

Position	Player	Club	Goal Assistance
1	(Iran) Ehsan Hajysafi	Sepahan	13
2	(Iran) Khosro Heidari	Esteghlal	12
3	(Iran) Milad Zanidpour	Rah Ahan	11
4	(Iran) Ebrahim Sadeghi	Saipa	10
5	(Iran) Hassan Ashjari	Zob Ahan	8
5	(Iran) Mehdi Karimian	Sepahan	8
7	(Iran) Ahmad Jamshidian	Sepahan	7
7	(Iran) Milad Meydavoudi	Esteghlal Ahvaz	7

Last updated: May 26, 2010
Source: iplstats.com/assistants

=== Cards ===
Position	Player	Team	Yellow card	Yellow card Red card	Red card	Total
1	(Iran) Ali Karimi	Steel Azin	8	2	1	11
2	(Iran) Ghasem Dehnavi	Mes Kerman	9	1	0	10
3	(Iran) Siamak Koohnavard	Moghavemat Sepasi	10	0	0	10
4	(Iran) Farhad Majidi	Esteghlal	8	1	0	9
5	(Iran) Sina Ashouri	Zobahan	9	0	0	9
5	(Iran) Saeed Lotfi	Paykan	9	0	0	9

Last updated: May 26, 2010
Source: iplstats.com/cards

=== Matches played ===
Position	Player	Club	Appearance
1	(Iran) Pirouz Ghorbani	Mes Kerman	32
1	(Iran) Mehdi Mohammadi	Steel Azin	32
1	(Iran) Hossein Pashaei	Rah Ahan	32
1	(Iran) Mostafa Sabri	Moghavemat Sepasi	32
2	(Iran) Mohsen Bengar	Sepahan	31
2	(Iran) Morteza Ebrahimi	Saipa	31
2	(Iran) Mostafa Ekrami	Tractor Sazi	31
2	(Iran) Mirhani Hashemi	Moghavemat Sepasi	31
2	(Iran) Mehdi Kiani	Tractor Sazi	31
2	(Iran) Pejman Montazeri	Esteghlal	31

Last updated: May 26, 2010
Source: iplstats.com/ appearances

== Attendances ==
=== Average home attendances ===
Pos	Team	Total	High	Low	Average	Change
1	Tractor Sazi	980,000	95,000	25,000	57,647	+514.2%
2	Persepolis	640,000	80,000	0	40,000	−1.7%
3	Esteghlal	510,000	90,000	0	31,875	−11.9%
4	Shahin Bushehr	247,000	20,000	2,000	14,529	+83.4%
5	Malavan	180,000	15,000	5,000	10,588	+55.2%
6	Sepahan	129,000	15,000	3,000	7,588	+31.6%
7	Moghavemat	123,000	20,000	1,000	7,235	+43.0%
8	Mes Kerman	101,000	15,000	2,000	5,941	−17.9%
9	Aboumoslem	95,000	30,000	0	5,938	+12.2%
10	Steel Azin	98,000	40,000	1,000	5,765	+756.6%
11	Saipa	93,000	40,000	1,000	5,471	+4.5%
12	Rah Ahan	92,000	50,000	1,000	5,412	+9.5%
13	Est. Ahvaz	86,000	17,000	2,000	5,059	+1.2%
14	Zob Ahan	84,000	15,000	2,000	4,941	0.0%
15	Foolad	81,000	15,000	1,000	4,765	−25.7%
16	Saba Qom	72,000	15,000	1,000	4,235	−15.3%
17	PAS Hamedan	66,000	10,000	1,000	3,882	+4.7%
18	Paykan	37,000	7,000	0	2,313	−42.2%
	League total	3,714,000	95,000	0	12,298	+37.3%

Updated to games played on 19 May 2010
Source: iplstats.com
Notes:
Matches with spectator bans are not included in average attendances
Shahin Bushehr, Steel Azin and Tractor Sazi played last season in Azadegan League

=== Highest attendances ===
Rank	Home team	Score	Away team	Attendance	Date	Week	Stadium
1	Tractor Sazi	0–0	Moghavemat	95,000	22 January 2010	24	Sahand
2	Esteghlal	1–1	Persepolis	90,000	2 October 2009	9	Azadi
3	Esteghlal	2–2	Tractor Sazi	80,000	15 January 2010	23	Azadi
3	Persepolis	2–1	Esteghlal	80,000	3 February 2010	26	Azadi
3	Tractor Sazi	2–1	Steel Azin	80,000	12 March 2010	29	Sahand
6	Tractor Sazi	1–1	Esteghlal	75,000	13 September 2009	6	Sahand
7	Esteghlal	2–0	Steel Azin	70,000	18 September 2009	7	Azadi
7	Tractor Sazi	1–0	Foolad	70,000	25 September 2009	8	Sahand
7	Tractor Sazi	2–2	PAS Hamedan	70,000	27 November 2009	17	Sahand
7	Tractor Sazi	1–1	Persepolis	70,000	16 April 2010	31	Sahand

Notes:
Updated to games played on 19 May 2010. Source: iplstats.com

== See also ==
- 2009–10 Azadegan League
- 2009–10 Iran Football's 2nd Division
- 2009–10 Iran Football's 3rd Division
- 2009–10 Hazfi Cup
- Iranian Super Cup
- 2009–10 Iranian Futsal Super League
