= Mostafa Sabri =

Iranian football player (born 1984)

Personal information
- Full name: Mostafa Sabri
- Date of birth: 13 February 1984 (age 42)
- Place of birth: Shiraz, Iran
- Height: 1.94 m (6 ft 4 1/2 in)
- Position: Defender

Youth career
- Fajr Sepasi

Senior career*
Years	Team	Apps	(Gls)
2005–2010	Fajr Sepasi	136	(8)
2010–2011	Saipa	3	(0)
2011–2013	Sanat Naft	30	(1)
2013–2014	Fajr Sepasi	10	(1)
- * Club domestic league appearances and goals as of 10 May 2013

Mostafa Sabri (Persian: مصطفی صبری; born 13 February 1984) is an Iranian football player who plays for Fajr Sepasi of the Iran Pro League.

== Professional ==
Sabri has played his entire career for Moghavemat Sepasi.

=== Club Career Statistics ===
Last Update 10 May 2013

Club performance			League		Cup		Continental		Total	
Season	Club	League	Apps	Goals	Apps	Goals	Apps	Goals	Apps	Goals
Iran			League		Hazfi Cup		Asia		Total	
2005–06	Moghavemat	Pro League	20	1			-	-	20	1
2006–07	Moghavemat	Pro League	26	2			-	-	26	2
2007–08	Moghavemat	Pro League	26	2			-	-	26	2
2008–09	Moghavemat	Pro League	31	3		0	-	-	31	3
2009–10	Moghavemat	Pro League	33	2		0	-	-	33	2
2010–11	Saipa	Pro League	3	0	1	0	-	-	4	0
2011–12	Sanat Naft	Pro League	28	1	2	0	-	-	30	1
2012–13	Sanat Naft	Pro League					-	-		
Career total			167	11	3	0	0	0	170	11

- Assist Goals

Season	Team	Assists
09–10	Moghavemat	2
10–11	Saipa	0
11–12	Sanat Naft	0
12–13	Sanat Naft	
