= Sergey Ponomarev =

Sergey Ponomarev may refer to:

- Sergey Ponomarev (photographer)
- Sergey Ponomarev (kickboxer)
- Sergey Ponomarev (footballer) (born 1956), Russian football coach and former player

== See also ==
- Sergei Ponomaryov (born 1953), Russian football coach and former player
