= Saeed Salamaat =

Iranian footballer and coach

Personal information
- Full name: Saeed Salammat
- Date of birth: October 22, 1963 (age 63)
- Place of birth: Abadan, Iran
- Position: Midfielder

Team information
- Current team: Sanat Naft B (manager)

Youth career
- 1981–1982: Sanat Naft

Senior career*
Years	Team	Apps	(Gls)
1982–2002	Sanat Naft		

Managerial career
- 2005–2013: Sanat Naft B (assistant)
- 2013: Sanat Naft B
- 2013: Sanat Naft (caretaker)
- 2013–: Sanat Naft B
- * Club domestic league appearances and goals

Saeed Salammat (Persian: سعید سلامات; born 22 October 1963 in Abadan, Iran) is an Iranian football coach and retired player who served as manager at Sanat Naft B. He was also caretaker manager of the junior team in 2013 in the absence of Acácio Casimiro due to a cancer illness.
