= Sergey Ponomarev (footballer) =

Russian footballer

Personal information
- Full name: Sergey Nikolayevich Ponomarev
- Date of birth: 6 December 1956 (age 69)
- Height: 1.92 m (6 ft 3 1/2 in)
- Position: Defender

Youth career
- DYuSSh Chekhov

Senior career*
Years	Team	Apps	(Gls)
1975–1976	FC Torpedo Podolsk		
1977–1980	Oka Stupino (amateur)		
1980	FC Dynamo Kashira		
1981–1992	Torpedo Ryazan	390	(31)
1993	Obninsk	42	(2)
1994	Zob Ahan		
1995	Oka Kolomna	34	(2)
1996–1997	Spartak Ryazan	35	(0)
1997	Spartak Rybnoye	4	(0)
1999	FC Mikhaylov		
1999	FC Transenergo Ryazan		
2005	FC Sasovo		

Managerial career
- 1995: Oka Kolomna (assistant)
- 2000–2002: Ryazan
- 2011–2012: Zvezda Ryazan (assistant)
- * Club domestic league appearances and goals

Sergey Nikolayevich Ponomarev (Russian: Сергей Николаевич Пономарёв; born 6 December 1956) is a Russian football coach and a former player.

== Club career ==
He played in the third-tier Soviet Second League and lower levels during the existence of the Soviet Union, and made his second-tier debut when the Soviet Union dissolved and the Russian football pyramid was created in 1992, in the Russian Football National League.

Ponomarev was the first foreign professional footballer to play in the Iranian Football League (Azadegan League) after the Iranian Revolution. In 1994, he was invited to Isfahan, Iran by his countrymen Yevgeny Liyadin who was coach of F.C. Zob Ahan at the time, where he played for one season.

== Coaching career ==
He coached FC Ryazan in the third-tier Russian Professional Football League in 2001 and 2002.
