= Reza Baziari =

Iranian football midfielder

Personal information
- Full name: Abdul Reza Baziari
- Date of birth: March 21, 1973 (age 53)
- Place of birth: Iran
- Position: Defender

Team information
- Current team: Shahin Bushehr
- Number: 5

Senior career*
Years	Team	Apps	(Gls)
2001–	Shahin Bushehr		
- * Club domestic league appearances and goals as of 7 September 2010

Reza Baziari (Persian: رضا بازیاری; born March 21, 1973) is an Iranian football midfielder who currently plays for Shahin Bushehr in the Iran Pro League. He is currently the captain of the team.

== Club career ==
Baziari joined Shahin Bushehr in 2001, and is currently the longest serving playing on the team.

Club performance			League		Cup		Continental		Total	
Season	Club	League	Apps	Goals	Apps	Goals	Apps	Goals	Apps	Goals
Iran			League		Hazfi Cup		Asia		Total	
2001–02	Shahin Bushehr	Azadegan		0			-	-		
2002–03	Shahin Bushehr	Azadegan		0			-	-		
2003–04	Shahin Bushehr	Azadegan		0			-	-		
2004–05	Shahin Bushehr	Azadegan		0			-	-		
2006–07	Shahin Bushehr	Azadegan		0			-	-		
2007–08	Shahin Bushehr	Azadegan		0			-	-		
2008–09	Shahin Bushehr	Azadegan		7			-	-		
2009–10	Shahin Bushehr	IPL	26	5			-	-		
2010–11	Shahin Bushehr	IPL	3	0	0	0	-	-	0	0
Total	Iran			12			0	0		
Career total				12			0	0		

- Assist Goals

Season	Team	Assists
09–10	Shahin	0
10–11	Shahin	0
