= Ali Firouzi =

Iranian footballer and coach

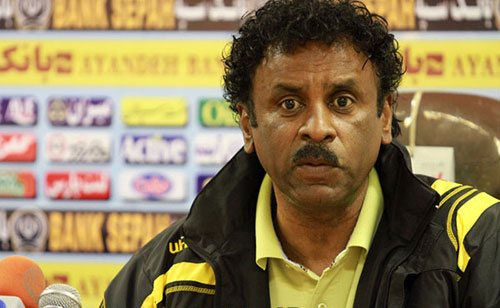

Personal information
- Full name: Alireza Firouzi
- Date of birth: 11 March 1955 (age 71)
- Place of birth: Abadan, Imperial State of Iran
- Position: Forward

Team information
- Current team: Naft Omidiyeh (manager)

Youth career
- 1973–1975: Shahrdari Abadan

Senior career*
Years	Team	Apps	(Gls)
1975–1990	Sanat Naft		

Managerial career
- 1990–19 h92: Sanat Naft (assistant)
- 1992–1994: Sanat Naft
- 1995–1999: Sanat Naft
- 2009–2010: Esteghlal Ahvaz
- 2010–2013: Sanat Naft B
- 2013: Sanat Naft (caretaker)
- 2015–: Naft Omidiyeh
- * Club domestic league appearances and goals

Ali Firouzi (Persian: علی فیروزی; born 11 March 1955 in Abadan, Iran) is an Iranian football coach and retired player who recently served as caretaker manager at Sanat Naft, in the absence of Acácio Casimiro due to a cancer illness. He formerly managed Sanat Naft twice, first from 1992 to 1994 when he was promoted to head coach after he had been an assistant coach for two years and then a second term from 1995 that ended in 1999. He was also head coach of Esteghlal Ahvaz for one season.
