= Mansour Ebrahimzadeh =

Iranian football manager

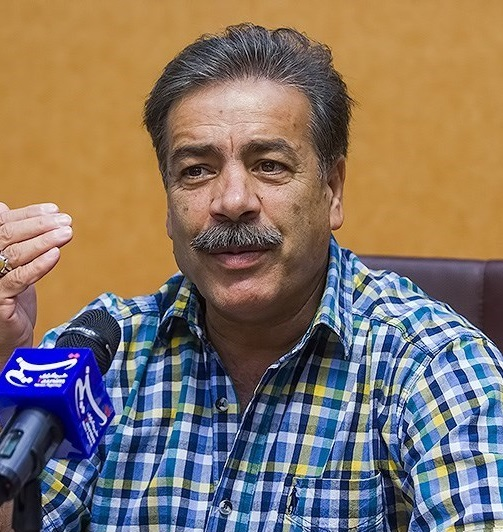

Personal information
- Full name: Mansour Ebrahimzadeh
- Date of birth: May 29, 1956 (age 70)
- Place of birth: Isfahan, Iran

Youth career
- 1973–1974: Sepahan
- 1974–1975: Isfahan XI

Senior career*
Years	Team	Apps	(Gls)
1975–1977	Bank Melli		
1977–1979	Sepahan		

Managerial career
- 1999–2002: Zob Ahan (assistant)
- 2003–2006: Zob Ahan (assistant)
- 2006–2008: Sepahan (assistant)
- 2007–2008: Iran (assistant)
- 2008: Iran (caretaker)
- 2008–2012: Zob Ahan
- 2012–2013: Naft Tehran
- 2013–2014: Rah Ahan
- 2014: Paykan
- 2016–2017: Mes Kerman
- 2018: Sepahan
- * Club domestic league appearances and goals

Mansour Ebrahimzadeh (Persian: منصور ابراهیم‌زاده; born 29 May 1956 in Isfahan) is an Iranian retired football player and former manager of Sepahan.

== Early life ==
He was born on 29 May 1956 in Isfahan, Iran. He graduated from Isfahan University.

== Playing career ==
=== Youth career ===
He began playing football in 1973 in Sepahan. Then he played for Isfahan XI between 1974 and 1975.

=== Bank Melli ===
He joined the Bank Melli in 1975 and left that club in 1977 after two years.

=== Sepahan ===
He returned to Sepahan in 1977 and played for the club until 1979. He scored ten goals in fifty two matches. He retired from playing football on May 9, 1979 after a match against Persepolis.

== Coaching career ==
=== Early years ===
After Nasser Hejazi became head coach of Zob Ahan in December 1998, he named Ebrahimzadeh as his assistant. Ebrahimzadeh was a trainer in the club in the last years. Hejazi left the club in December 2001, but Ebrahimzadeh kept his position in the club under the new head coach Bahram Atef. After Atef resigned as the club's head coach, Ebrahimzadeh left the club to become Sepahan's assistant head coach. He returned to Zob Ahan in summer 2003. He stayed in Zob Ahan until Sepahan appointed him as assistant head coach for a second time in June 2006.

In July 2002, Ebrahimzadeh left Zob Ahan and returned to his former club. Sepahan won the Iran Pro League in the 2002–03 season. Sepahan's head coach, Farhad Kazemi proposed another assistant to the club and Ebrahimzadeh resigned after it. On 1 June 2006, Luka Bonačić became head coach of Sepahan and Ebrahimzadeh was named as one of his assistants. Bonačić gave more power to Ebrahimzadeh as the other assistants. He also led Zob Ahan in the 2007 Hazfi Cup Final Second Leg when Bonačić traveled to his country for personal reasons. He resigned after becoming the caretaker manager of the Iran national football team.

In 2007, after Amir Ghalenoie became head coach of the national football team, Ebrahimzadeh was appointed as one of his assistants along with Afshin Peyrovani. He kept his position in Sepahan as assistant head coach. He was a member of coaching staff in the 2007 AFC Asian Cup.

After Ghalenoie's dismissal as head coach, Ebrahimzadeh was named as caretaker head coach and led three matches which were all drawn. After Javier Clemente traveled to Iran to become the new head coach of the national team, Ebrahimzadeh was named as assistant again but Clemente refused to become Iran national team's head coach and left Iran. Ali Daei was named as new head coach but he was not belief Ebrahimzadeh.

=== Appointment as head coach of Zob Ahan ===
He was chosen as the head coach of Zob Ahan in summer 2008 and won the Hazfi Cup in his first season and finished second in the league where he lost the trophy on the final week of the season. He finished second again in his second season and also qualified to the finals of ACL but was defeated and became runner up. He finished the 2010-11 Persian Gulf Cup in third position with Zob Ahan. Zob Ahan failed to replay their last year's good results in the AFC Champions League and failed to reach the semifinal. He was later named as 16th best coach in the world by the IFFHS in 2010. On 6 May 2012, he announced that he would leave Zob Ahan at the end of season.

=== Naft Tehran ===
On 28 May 2012, he signed a one-year contract with Naft Tehran. He started successfully at his new team, leading them to fifth place at the end of the season, with one point behind Foolad which qualified them for the champions league. He was offered a contract to extend his contract with the club, which he refused to sign.

=== Rah Ahan ===
He was named as Rah Ahan's head coach for the 2013–14 season after coming to an agreement with the club. He was previously linked to Tractor Sazi, Persepolis and Saba Qom. He officially signed his contract on 1 June 2013. His first match as head coach of Rah Ahan was a 0–0 draw over Mes Kerman. He led Rah Ahan to 11th place and left the team at the end of the season, when the club faced ownership problems.

=== Paykan ===
Ebrahimzadeh became head coach of Paykan on 1 June 2014, replacing Farhad Kazemi. However, he was sacked on 25 November 2014 after five months.

=== Mes Kerman ===
He was the head coach of Mes Kerman form Azadegan League in 2016–2017 season.

=== Sepahan ===
Mansour Ebrahimzadeh was appointed as the head coach of Sepahan on January 27, 2018.

=== Statistics ===
As of 27 April 2018

Managerial record by team and tenure
Team	From	To	Record							
Team	From	To	M	W	D	L	GF	GA	GD	Win %
Sepahan (caretaker)	June 2007	June 2007	1	1	0	0	3	0	+3	100.00
Iran (interim)	January 2008	March 2008	3	0	3	0	0	0	+0	0.00
Zob Ahan	July 2008	July 2012	169	84	52	33	257	157	+100	49.70
Naft Tehran	July 2012	June 2013	36	15	13	8	46	33	+13	41.67
Rah Ahan	June 2013	June 2014	33	9	10	14	33	38	−5	27.27
Paykan	June 2014	November 2014	17	5	5	7	9	15	−6	29.41
Mes Kerman	July 2016	July 2017	34	13	15	6	39	21	+18	38.24
Sepahan	January 2018	May 2018	9	2	3	4	10	9	+1	22.22
Total			302	129	101	72	397	273	+124	42.72

== Honours ==
=== Club ===
Zob Ahan

- AFC Champions League Runner-Up: 2010
- Iran Pro League Runner-Up: 2008–09, 2009–10
- Hazfi Cup: 2008–09

=== Individual ===
- IFFHS 16th best coach in the world: 2010, 2011
