= Mohammad Hosseini (footballer, born 1979) =

Iranian football player

Personal information
- Full name: Mohammad Hosseini Farimani
- Date of birth: June 22, 1979 (age 47)
- Place of birth: Fariman, Iran
- Position: Defender

Youth career
- Darooyi Nasr Fariman

Senior career*
| Years | Team | Apps | (Gls) |
| 1994–1997 | Mashhad-Davam | | |
| 1997–2001 | Payam Mashhad | | |
| 2001–2008 | Aboomoslem | | (10) |
| 2008–2012 | Zob Ahan | 111 | (25) |
| 2012–2013 | Malavan | 2 | (0) |
| 2013–2014 | Aboumoslem | 3 | (0) |
| 2014–2015 | Fajr Sepasi | 6 | (0) |
| Total | | | (35) |

International career^{‡}
| 2010–2012 | Iran | 1 | (0) |
- * Club domestic league appearances and goals as of 8 September 2012 ‡ National team caps and goals as of 11 August 2010

Mohammad Hosseini (Persian: سید محمد حسینی; born 22 June 1979) is a retired Iranian football player who played in the Persian Gulf Pro League and Azadegan League.

== Club career ==
| Club performance | | | League | | Cup | | Continental | | Total | |
| Season | Club | League | Apps | Goals | Apps | Goals | Apps | Goals | Apps | Goals |
| Iran | | | League | | Hazfi Cup | | Asia | | Total | |
|---|---|---|---|---|---|---|---|---|---|---|
| 2005–06 | Aboomoslem | Iran Pro League | 27 | 0 | | | - | - | | |
| 2006–07 | Aboomoslem | Iran Pro League | 24 | 1 | | | - | - | | |
| 2007–08 | Aboomoslem | Iran Pro League | 30 | 9 | 2 | 0 | - | - | 32 | 9 |
| 2008–09 | Zob Ahan | Iran Pro League | 31 | 4 | | | - | - | | |
| 2009–10 | Zob Ahan | Iran Pro League | 31 | 7 | | 1 | 12 | 1 | | 9 |
| 2010–11 | Zob Ahan | Iran Pro League | 30 | 12 | 1 | 0 | 8 | 1 | 39 | 13 |
| 2011–12 | Zob Ahan | Iran Pro League | 18 | 2 | 0 | 0 | 0 | 0 | 18 | 2 |
| 2012–13 | Zob Ahan | Iran Pro League | 1 | 0 | 0 | 0 | 0 | 0 | 1 | 0 |
| 2012–13 | Malavan | Iran Pro League | 2 | 0 | 0 | 0 | - | - | 2 | 0 |
| 2013–14 | Aboomoslem | Azadegan League | 3 | 0 | | | - | - | 3 | 0 |
| 2014–15 | Fajr Sepasi | Azadegan League | 6 | 0 | | | - | - | 6 | 0 |
| Total | Career total | | | 33 | | | 20 | 2 | | |

- Assist Goals

| Season | Team | Assists |
|---|---|---|
| 06–07 | Aboomoslem | 2 |
| 08–09 | Zob Ahan | 6 |
| 09–10 | Zob Ahan | 1 |
| 10–11 | Zob Ahan | 1 |
| 11–12 | Zob Ahan | 2 |
| 12–13 | Malavan | 0 |

== National Team Career ==
He made his debut for Iran national football team in a friendly versus Armenia national football team on August 11, 2010.

== Achievements ==
- Runner-up: Hazfi Cup in 2005 with F.C. Aboomoslem.
