= Ali Akbar Ostad-Asadi =

Iranian footballer

Personal information
- Full name: Ali Akbar Ostad-Asadi
- Date of birth: 17 September 1965 (age 61)
- Place of birth: Tabriz, East Azerbaijan province, Iran
- Height: 1.69 m (5 ft 6 1/2 in)
- Position: Defender

Senior career*
Years	Team	Apps	(Gls)
1987–1995	Machine Sazi		
1995–2003	Zob Ahan		
2003–2006	Machine Sazi		

International career
1996–1998	Iran	33	(0)

Managerial career
- 2011–2017: Gostaresh (Assistant)
- * Club domestic league appearances and goals as of 8 October 2006

Ali Akbar Ostad-Asadi (Persian: علی‌اکبر استاداسدی) (born 17 September 1965 in Tabriz) is a retired Iranian football player. During his career, he played for two clubs, Zob Ahan FC and Mashin Sazi of Tabriz, for both of which he was a captain.

He made 51 appearances for the Iran national football team and was a member of the team in the 1998 FIFA World Cup.
