= Shahid Mofatteh Stadium =

- Full name: Shahid Mofatteh Stadium
- Location: Hamedan, Iran
- Capacity: 15,000

Tenant
- PAS Hamedan F.C.

Shahid Mofatteh Stadium is a multi-use stadium in Hamedan, Iran. It is used mostly for football matches, on club level by PAS Hamedan F.C. The stadium has a capacity of 15,000 spectators. This stadium was one of the hosts of the 2014 AFC U-14 Championship.
