= Sanat Naft Abadan F.C. =

Iranian football club

Sanat Naft صنعت نفت آبادان
- Full name: Sanat Naft Abadan Football Club
- Short name: SNAC
- Founded: 11 January 1973; 53 years ago
- Ground: Takhti Stadium; Abadan
- Capacity: 20,000
- Owner: NIOC
- Head Coach: Sirous Pourmousavi
- League: Persian Gulf Pro League
- 2025–26: Azadegan League, 3rd of 18 (promoted via play-off)
- Website: www.sanatenaft.com
Home colours	Away colours

Sanat Naft Abadan Football Club (Persian: مؤسسه فرهنگى ورزشى صنعت نفت آبادان, Bāshgāh-e Futbāl-e San'at Naft-e Ābādān) is an Iranian football club based in Abadan, Iran. They currently play in the Azadegan League after being relegated from the Azadegan League in the 2023–2024 season. The team is sponsored by Iran's national petroleum industry and is part of the sports club Sanat Naft Athletic Club. Sanat Naft has a reserve team, Sanat Naft Novin who currently compete in the 2nd Division.

Despite their lack of success in past years, they are supported by the people of Abadan.

== Club history ==
=== Establishment and early years ===
Prior to the establishment of the Takhte Jamshid League in 1972, the people of Abadan mostly followed two clubs, Kargar FC and Jam FC. Kargar had been established by workers from Abadan's oil refinery. Ten years later, Parviz Dehdari along with some of his classmates at Razi School established Jam FC. When the Takhte Jamshid League was established, the city of Abadan was given one spot. The club was to be managed by Iran's oil industry. The club's original kit colors were white, blue and black.

=== Post revolution ===
Football was popular in Abadan, but everything stopped when the Iranian Revolution took place in 1978. Football was no longer a priority, and it was shoved even farther out of the limelight when the Iran–Iraq War began in 1980. Abadan and Khuzestan were heavily hit during the war. Abadan's refinery was shut down, and hundreds of thousands left the city. From 1980 to 1988 the club was based in Shiraz. Once in Shiraz, the club had to start from Iran's third division, but was able to make it back to the top flight.

After the war the club went back to Abadan, but due to the war's negative effects on the city and poor management in the football club, Sanat Naft has not been able to have any major success.

=== Iran Pro League ===
Sanat Naft were present in Iran's Azadegan League until the 2001–02 season when they were relegated. They made it back to the Iran Pro League in 2002, but the club was relegated the same season.

Portuguese coach Acácio Casimiro signed a one–year deal as head coach of Sanat Naft on 18 June 2006 but was later replaced by Ebrahim Ghasempour. After Sanat Naft was promoted to the Iran Pro League they were immediately relegated the same season under head coach Ahmad Tousi. Tousi took over for Ghasempour as he was sacked after 20 games. The club was in last place with only 16 point to show under Ghasempour with a record of 4 wins 4 ties and 12 losses.

==== 2005 promotion controversy ====
Sanat Naft made it to the promotion playoffs in the 2004–05 season. Until the final game of the promotion playoffs, Sanat Naft was in second place and head of Rah Ahan on goal difference. On the last day despite Sanat Naft's win against Payam Mashhad, Rah Ahan defeated Shahid Ghandi by a score of 6–1 to finish second, ahead of Sanat Naft on goal difference. Sanat Naft officials immediately suggested that Shahid Ghandi had allowed Rah Ahan to win by such a huge score. Sanat Naft was not able to prove this allegation with evidence. Later Sanat Naft claimed that Rah Ahan had used an ineligible player; this went through several courts and Rah Ahan was found guilty.

Two seasons later Sanat Naft was automatically awarded a promotion spot to the Persian Gulf Pro League starting in the 2007–08 season. They could not stay in league and were relegated at the end of the season.

=== Return to the Persian Gulf Pro League ===
After spending two years in the Azadegan League the club was again promoted to the Iran Pro League in 2010. In their first year Sanat Naft finished a ninth place. The following year the club again finished in 10th place. Before the 2012–13 Iran Pro League season there were high expectations for Sanat Naft. The club was a major disappointment and finished 16th and was relegated back to the Azadegan League.

After a few seasons in the lower division, in the 2015–16 season after a last day 2–1 win against third place team Fajr Sepasi, Sanat Naft returned to the top flight after a three-year absence.

== Players ==
=== First-team squad ===
Note: Flags indicate national team as defined under FIFA eligibility rules; some limited exceptions apply. Players may hold more than one non-FIFA nationality.

No.	Pos.	Nation	Player
1	GK	IRI	Ahmad Gohari
2	DF	IRI	Mohammad Aghajanpour
4	DF	IRI	Reza Yazdandoost
6	MF	IRI	Ali Taheran
7	FW	IRI	Mohsen Seyfi
8	MF	IRI	Khashayar Zebarjad
9	FW	IRI	Reza Rezaei
10	MF	IRI	Taleb Rikani (Captain)
12	DF	IRI	Meysam Teymouri
13	MF	GAB	Eric Bocoum
14	MF	IRI	Mohammadreza Ghobeishavi
19	DF	IRI	Amir Hossein Kouliyan ^{U23}
21	MF	IRI	Mohammad Abbasi
22	GK	IRI	Parsa Afzali ^{U21}
25	DF	IRI	Sajjad Asakere
27	MF	IRI	Mohammad Dindar ^{U23}

No.	Pos.	Nation	Player
29	MF	IRI	Mehdi Mashayekh ^{U23}
33	DF	IRI	Meysam Tohidast
34	DF	IRI	Milad Fakhreddini (vice-captain)
41	DF	IRI	Fayaz Mirdoraghi
43	GK	IRI	Danial Bahramitabar ^{U23}
44	DF	IRI	Arman Abed ^{U21}
72	DF	IRI	Mahan Kakolarimi ^{U23}
77	MF	IRI	Mohammad Hossein Fallah
78	DF	IRI	Matin Karimzadeh
83	FW	IRI	Hesam Pourmohiseni ^{U23}
88	DF	IRI	Ali Nasserkhaki ^{U23}
90	MF	IRI	Ali Mazrae ^{U21}
91	FW	IRI	Sajjad Amarlou ^{U23}
97	FW	IRI	Mohammad Hossein Baseri ^{U25}
99	FW	IRI	Saman Mehrabizadeh

== Managers ==
Name	Nat	From	To
Harry Game	(England)	February 1972	December 1974
Gholam Hossein Vaghef	(Iran)	January 1975	December 1976
Manouchehr Salia	(Iran)	February 1977	June 1991
Jassem Ahleiorf	(Iran)	June 1991	June 1992
Ali Firouzi	(Iran)	June 1992	June 1994
Abdolvahed Bazme	(Iran)	June 1994	June 1995
Ali Firouzi	(Iran)	June 1995	June 1999
Gevorg Papiyan	(Armenia)	June 1999	December 1999
Fereydoun Moeeni	(Iran)	December 1999	June 2000
Ebrahim Ghasempour	(Iran)	June 2000	June 2002
Mansour Pourheidari	(Iran)	June 2002	November 2002
Ebrahim Ghasempour	(Iran)	November 2002	June 2003
Abdolreza Barzegari	(Iran)	June 2003	October 2003
Hassan Dashti	(Iran)	October 2003	June 2004
Baýram Durdyýew	(Turkmenistan)	July 2004	January 2005
Parviz Mazloomi	(Iran)	January 2005	June 2006
Acácio Casimiro	(Portugal)	June 2006	June 2007
Ebrahim Ghasempour	(Iran)	June 2007	February 2008
Ahmad Tousi	(Iran)	February 2008	June 2008
Mojtaba Taghavi	(Iran)	July 2008	February 2009
Bijan Zolfagharnasab	(Iran)	February 2009	February 2010
Acácio Casimiro	(Portugal)	February 2010	February 2011

Name	Nat	From	To
Gholam Hossein Peyrovani	(Iran)	February 2011	November 2011
José Costa	(Portugal)	November 2011	September 2012
Acácio Casimiro	(Portugal)	September 2012	May 2013
Saeed Salamaat	(Iran)	May 2013	June 2013
Ebrahim Ghasempour	(Iran)	June 2013	March 2014
Behnam Seraj	(Iran)	March 2014	August 2014
Carlos Manuel	(Portugal)	August 2014	December 2015
Nader Dastneshan	(Iran)	December 2015	January 2017
Firouz Karimi	(Iran)	January 2017	May 2017
Faraz Kamalvand	(Iran)	May 2017	June 2018
Paulo Sérgio	(Portugal)	June 2018	May 2019
Dragan Skočić	(Croatia)	July 2019	February 2020
Behnam Seraj	(Iran)	February 2020	August 2020
Sirous Pourmousavi	(Iran)	September 2020	September 2021
Alireza Mansourian	(Iran)	September 2021	June 2022
Reza Parkas	(Germany)	July 2022	September 2022
Firouz Karimi	(Iran)	September 2022	November 2022
Edson Tavares	(Brazil)	November 2022	March 2023
Abdollah Veisi	(Iran)	March 2023	January 2024
Sohrab Bakhtiarizadeh	(Iran)	January 2024	March 2024
Faraz Kamalvand	(Iran)	March 2024	current

=== Club management ===
Position	Nation
CEO	(Iran) Ali Issazadeh
Economic Deputy	(Iran) Meysam Rasti
Sport Deputy	(Iran) Masoud Rezaeiyan
Technical Director	(Iran) Ali Firouzi
Team Manager	(Iran) Morteza Dehdaripour
Manager and Head Coach	(Iran) Faraz Kamalvand
Assistant coaches	
Goalkeeping coach	

== Honours ==
- Azadegan League
  - Runners–up (2): 2001–02, 2009–10
    - لیگ دسته دوم ایران قهرمان(۲): ۷۵_۱۳۷۴، ۸۱_۱۳۸۲_

18 سال حضور در لیگ برتر خلیج فارس ایران

2 بار حضور در نیم نهایی جام حذفی ایران
