= Yevgeny Lyadin =

Russian footballer and manager

Personal information
- Full name: Yevgeny Ivanovich Lyadin
- Date of birth: April 9, 1926
- Place of birth: Moscow, Russian SFSR, Soviet Union
- Date of death: April 3, 2011 (aged 84)
- Position: Midfielder

Senior career*
Years	Team	Apps	(Gls)
1948–1956	Lokomotiv Moscow	136	(4)
1957	Shakhtar Kadiyevka	17	(1)

Managerial career
- 1965–1972: USSR U19
- 1974–1978: Zob Ahan
- 1979–1982: USSR U19
- 1994–1995: Zob Ahan
- * Club domestic league appearances and goals

Yevgeny Ivanovich Lyadin (Russian: Евгений Иванович Лядин) (April 9, 1926 – April 3, 2011) was a Russian football manager and former player.

Lyadin was the first foreign professional football manager to coach a club in the Iranian Football League (Azadegan League) after the Iranian Revolution. In 1994 while coaching F.C. Zob Ahan a club based in Isfahan, Iran, he invited his fellow countryman Sergey Ponomarev to come and play for his team.

Lyadin was the coach of Soviet youth national teams in 1965–1972 and 1979–1982. His teams won the UEFA European Under-19 Football Championship in 1966 and 1967.
