= Acácio Casimiro =

Portuguese football manager and former player

Personal information
- Full name: Acácio Alfredo Casimiro
- Date of birth: 24 March 1949 (age 77)
- Place of birth: Lisbon, Portugal
- Height: 1.75 m (5 ft 9 in)
- Position: Midfielder

Youth career
- Espinho

Senior career*
Years	Team	Apps	(Gls)
1967–1972	Espinho		
1972–1977	Boavista	122	(19)
1977–1978	Espinho	25	(2)
1978–1979	Famalicão	22	(3)
1979–1980	Paredes	21	(2)
1981–1982	Amarante		
1982–1983	Paredes		
Total		190	(26)

Managerial career
- 1979–1980: Paredes (player-coach)
- 1980–1981: Amarante
- 1981–1982: Paredes
- 1982–1986: Boavista (assistant)
- 1986–1987: Leixões (assistant)
- 1987–1989: Estrela Amadora (assistant)
- 1989–1991: Boavista (assistant)
- 1991–1992: Vitória Guimarães (assistant)
- 1992–1994: Estrela Amadora (assistant)
- 1994: Estrela Amadora
- 1995: Leixões
- 1995–1996: Famalicão
- 1996–1997: Freamunde
- 1997–1998: Porto (assistant)
- 1998–1999: Betis (assistant)
- 1999–2000: Espérance Tunis
- 2000–2001: AO Evizo
- 2001–2002: Al-Shabab
- 2002–2003: Kazma
- 2003: Al-Muharraq
- 2003–2004: Raja Casablanca
- 2004–2005: Al Ittihad
- 2006: Al-Faisaly
- 2006–2007: Sanat Naft
- 2008–2009: Henan Construction
- 2010–2011: Sanat Naft
- 2011–2012: Shahrdari Bandar Abbas
- 2012–2013: Sanat Naft
- 2014–2015: Sloboda Tuzla
- * Club domestic league appearances and goals

Acácio Alfredo Casimiro (born 24 March 1949 in Lisbon) is a Portuguese former football midfielder and manager.

== Honors ==
Raja Casablanca (1):

- Moroccan League (1): 2004
