= Zob Ahan Esfahan F.C. =

Association football club in Isfahan, Iran

Zob Ahan
- Full name: Zob Ahan Esfahan Football Club
- Nickname: Gandos (The Marsh Crocodiles)
- Short name: Zob Ahan
- Founded: 6 July 1969; 57 years ago
- Ground: Foolad Shahr Stadium
- Capacity: 20,000
- Owner: Esfahan Steel Company
- Chairman: Javad Mohammadi
- Head Coach: Mohammad Rabiei
- League: Persian Gulf Pro League
- 2025–26: Persian Gulf Pro League, 15th of 16
- Website: zobahanclub.com
Home colours	Away colours

Zob Ahan Esfahan Football Club (Persian: باشگاه فرهنگى ورزشى ذوب‌آهن اصفهان, Bâšgâh-e Futbâl-e Zobâhan-e Esfahân) is an Iranian football club based in Fuladshahr, Iran. It competes in the Persian Gulf Pro League. The team is sponsored by the Isfahan Steel Company, which also goes by the name Zob Ahan. The club's main rival is fellow Isfahani team Sepahan, which is sponsored by the rival steel mill Mobarakeh Steel Company.

Zob Ahan club also has a basketball team, sponsored by the same Isfahan Steel Company, which is one of the teams in the Iranian Super League.

In the 2010 AFC Champions League. Zob Ahan finished as runners-up losing 3–1 to South Korean club Seongnam Ilhwa Chunma in the final.

Zob Ahan has won the Hazfi Cup on four occasions (2002–03, 2008–09, 2014–15 and 2015–16) and have finished as runners-up one time (2000–01). The club has also finished as League runners-up three times (2004–05, 2008–09 and 2009–10) and has won the Iranian Super Cup once (2016).

== Club history ==
=== Early years (1969–1980) ===
Mohammad Ali Taghizadeh Farahmand established the club in 1969. They entered the Takht Jamshid Cup in 1973 and end season in the 10th place. They promoted to the quarterfinals of the Hazfi Cup in 1976. Their best results in Takht Jamshid Cup was earned in 1977–78 in the 8th place.

=== Azadegan League (1980–2001) ===
The team has participated in the highest division of the Iranian league system since 1973, except for the 1995 season when they played in the 2nd division. After Iranian Revolution in 1979, Takht Jamshid Cup was suspended due to Iran–Iraq War. After the end of the war, league began again in the title of Azadegan League. They were once again promoted to the 1st division the year after.

=== PGPL (2001–present) ===
Zob Ahan currently play in the IPL starting from 2001. The club's first honor, remains the winning of the Hazfi Cup in 2003, after defeating the Shiraz-based team Moghavemat Sepasi in the finals. This feat was repeated in the 2008–09 Hazfi Cup, when the club beat Rah Ahan to re-claim the title after 6 years. The club made its first appearance in the AFC Champions League in 2004, as the winners of the 2003 Hazfi Cup, but were eliminated in the group stages.

Having missed out on winning their first-ever domestic league title in the 2008–09 season, Zobahan were one of the title contenders once again in the 2009–10 season. However, at the end, they had to settle for second place once again after finishing six points behind their city rivals Sepahan. They also lost their grip on the Hazfi Cup after a shock 0–2 loss to a second-division side Gostaresh Foulad in the semi-finals.

==== 2010 AFC Champion League ====
In the 2010 AFC Champions League Zob Ahan finished first on the group stage that included FC Bunyodkor, Al-Wahda and Al-Ittihad. By finishing first they qualified for the first time for the Knockout stages. On the Round of 16 they draw country neighbours Mes Kerman winning 1–0. The club then qualified to the quarter-finals and were drawn with title holders Pohang Steelers, Zob Ahan won 2–1 at home and draw 1–1 on Korea, knocking-out the title holders. Zob Ahan played against Saudi powerhouse Al Hilal which they won 1–0 at home, and won 1–0 on Saudi Arabia leading the club to an Asian Champions League final where they face Seongnam Ilhwa Chunma. On 13 November, in the final Zob Ahan lost 1–3 to Seongnam Ilhwa Chunma. Zob Ahan couldn't be the champions on their 2nd Asian Champions League participation always being under-dogs. The following year the club made it to the quarter-finals but lost to Korean club Suwon Samsung Bluewings.

==== Dark years ====
After the 2011 Champions League, a 6th place league finish in 2012 meant that the club failed to retain its spot in the Champions League. The following year, the club finished 14th in the league, narrowly avoiding relegation through a play-off. Fan attendance started to dip and Zob Ahan had another sub par year in the 2013–14 Iran Pro League season, finishing 13th, changing three managers during the course of the season and again narrowly avoiding relegation.

==== Resurrection under Golmohammadi and Hosseini ====
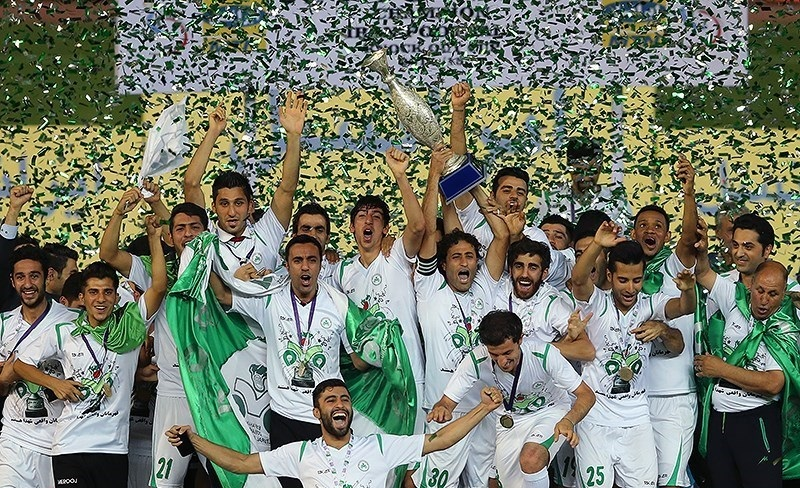
Zob Ahan players celebrating Hazfi Cup title in 2015

In the summer of 2014 Zob Ahan announced Yahya Golmohammadi as the club's new manager. After a poor start to the season, Zob Ahan when on a six match unbeaten run which placed them 6th in week 23. On 5 December 2015 Zob Ahan defeated Persepolis 2–1 in the Hazfi Cup semi-final to advance to the final for the fourth time in club history. On 15 May 2015 after a 0–0 draw against Padideh, Zob Ahan finished fourth and returned to the AFC Champions League after five years. Zob Ahan also won their third Hazfi Cup title after defeating Naft Tehran 3–1 in the final.

On 23 February 2016 Zob Ahan won its first match AFC Champions League since 2011, defeating Lekhwiya of Qatar 1–0. Zob Ahan qualified for the Round of 16 of the AFC Champions League on 20 April 2016 after defeating Saudi club Al Nassr 3–0 in match day 5. However, Zob Ahan were defeated 3–1 on aggregate by Emirati club Al Ain in the Round of 16. Zob Ahan once again qualified for the final of the 2016 Hazfi Cup to defend their crown against Esteghlal. Zob Ahan defeated Esteghlal in penalties and won the Hazfi Cup for the fourth time in the club's history. Zob Ahan won the Iranian Super Cup after beating Esteghlal Khuzestan 4–2 in extra time. This was the first trophy that Zob Ahan won in Foolad Shahr Stadium.

In the beginning of the 2016–17, after poor results, Golmohammadi was fired as manager of the team and was replaced by Assistant coach Mojtaba Hosseini. Hosseini led Zob Ahan to the semi-finals of the Hazfi Cup, where they lost to Tractor.

== Colours and crest ==
One of Zob Ahan's nicknames is Sabzpoushan ("The Greens", Persian: سبز پوشان), stemming from their traditional kit, which is predominantly green. From the foundation of the club, the common home kit includes a green shirt, black or white shorts, and white or yellow socks. White and black colours are also seen in the kit. The away kit of the club is commonly with a white background.

== Stadium and facilities ==
The home stadium of the club is Foolad Shahr Stadium located in Fooladshahr, Isfahan. The stadium had 20,000 capacity but was renovated to hold about 30,000 people in 2011. The stadium was built in 1998.

== Rivalries ==
Zob Ahan is part of the Esfahan derby or Naghsh-e-Jahan derby. The Esfahan derby goes back to the 1970s, when Zob Ahan and Sepahan faced each other in Takht Jamshid Cup seasons (1974/75, 1975/76, 1976/77, 1977/78). Their rivalry resumed in the 1990s when they faced each other in Azadegan League seasons (1993/94, 1996/97, 1997/98) and from then on the two met each other twice a year.

== Players ==
=== First-team squad ===
As of 1 September 2026

Note: Flags indicate national team as defined under FIFA eligibility rules; some limited exceptions apply. Players may hold more than one non-FIFA nationality.

No.	Pos.	Nation	Player
1	GK	IRI	Hassan Pourhamidi
2	DF	IRI	Abolfazl Hosseinifar ^{U23}
3	DF	IRI	Saeed Karimi
4	DF	IRI	Arash Ghaderi
5	DF	IRI	Seyed Mohammad Hosseini
6	MF	IRI	Ali Shojaei
7	FW	IRI	Mohammad Javad Mohammadi
9	DF	IRI	Ali Azadmanesh
10	FW	IRI	Omid Latifi
11	FW	IRI	Rahman Jafari
14	MF	IRI	Pouya Mokhtari
16	MF	IRI	Amir Hossein Bahador
17	MF	IRI	Jalaleddin Alimohammadi (captain)
18	MF	IRI	Amin Jahan Kohan
19	FW	IRI	Hadi Baghban ^{U23}
20	GK	IRI	Davoud Noushi Soufiani
21	FW	IRI	Mohammad Ali Khaledi ^{U21}
22	GK	IRI	Ashkan Rashedi ^{U21}

No.	Pos.	Nation	Player
23	DF	IRI	Amirhossein Jeddi
24	MF	IRI	Hossein Safari
28	MF	IRI	Nima Entezari
30	FW	IRI	Ali Eslami ^{U25}
31	MF	IRI	Hamed Asgari ^{U25}
33	DF	IRI	Hesam Nafari ^{U21}
42	MF	IRI	Hadi Gheybipour ^{U21}
43	DF	IRI	Hossein Jorgeh ^{U21}
55	DF	IRI	Behnam Teymourian ^{U23}
57	DF	IRI	Shahin Taherkhani
66	MF	IRI	Reza Sharifi Basir ^{U23}
67	FW	IRI	Houman Elyasi ^{U19}
68	MF	IRI	Abolfazl Mohammadi ^{U21}
71	MF	IRI	Arash Mortazavi ^{U21}
77	MF	IRI	Alireza Kazemi
87	MF	IRI	Morteza Farkhani ^{U19}
88	MF	IRI	Farshid Esmaeili
99	MF	IRI	Mahmoud Ghaed Rahmati

=== Out on loan ===
Note: Flags indicate national team as defined under FIFA eligibility rules; some limited exceptions apply. Players may hold more than one non-FIFA nationality.

No.	Pos.	Nation	Player

== Notable players ==
This list of former players includes those who received international caps while playing for the team, made significant contributions to the team in terms of appearances or goals while playing for the team, or who made significant contributions to the sport either before they played for the team, or after they left. It is clearly not yet complete and all inclusive, and additions and refinements will continue to be made over time.

=== Famous Players ===
For notable players see List of Zob Ahan F.C. players.
For details on former players see Category:Zob Ahan Esfahan F.C. players.

=== Players on international cups ===
Cup	Players
(Argentina) 1978 FIFA World Cup	(Iran) Rasoul Korbekandi
(United Arab Emirates) 1996 AFC Asian Cup	(Iran) Ali Akbar Ostad-Asadi
(France) 1998 FIFA World Cup	(Iran) Ali Akbar Ostad-Asadi
(Indonesia) (Malaysia) 2007 AFC Asian Cup (Thailand) (Vietnam)	(Iran) Mehdi Rajabzadeh
(Qatar) 2011 AFC Asian Cup	(Iran) Shahab Gordan (Iran) Ghasem Haddadifar (Iran) Mohammad Reza Khalatbari (Iran) Farshid Talebi
(Brazil) 2014 FIFA World Cup	(Iran) Ghasem Haddadifar
(Russia) 2018 FIFA World Cup	(Iran) Mohammad Rashid Mazaheri

=== Club captains ===
#	Name	Nat	Career in Zob Ahan	Captaincy	Shirt Num
1	Rasoul Korbekandi	(Iran)	1969–80	1970–80	1
2	Mahmood Ebrahimzadeh	(Iran) (Iran)	1976–86	1980–86	7
3	Rahman Rezaei	(Iran)	1996–01	1997–00	10
4	Ali Akbar Ostad-Asadi	(Iran)	1995–03	2000–03	15
5	Sepehr Heidari	(Iran)	2000–07; 2012–14	2003–07	3
6	Mohammad Salsali	(Iran)	2004–14	2007–14	7
7	Mehdi Rajabzadeh	(Iran)	2003–07; 2010–11; 2012–18	2014–18	30
8	Ghasem Haddadifar	(Iran)	2003–2021	2018–2021	8
9	Masoud Ebrahimzadeh	(Iran)	2018–2023	2021–2023	7

== Club officials ==
=== IPL managers ===
Only IPL matches are counted.

Last updated 10 August 2021.

Name	Nat	From	To	Record					
Name	Nat	From	To	P	W	D	L	Win %	Final position
Nasser Hejazi	(Iran)	Jul 2001	Dec 2001	20	8	6	4	40%	3rd (until week 20)
Bahram Atef	(Iran)	Dec 2001	Jul 2002	6	2	3	3	33.4%	(01–02) 6th
Samvel Darbinyan	(Armenia)	Jul 2002	May 2003	52	21	11	20	40%	(02-03) 8th (03-04) 4th
Rasoul Korbekandi	(Iran)	May 2003	Jun 2007	90	39	26	25	43.4%	(04-05) 2nd, (05-06) 6th, (06-07) 8th
Zoran Đorđević	(Serbia)	Jun 2007	Oct 2007	10	3	4	3	30%	17th (until week 10)
Bijan Zolfagharnasab	(Iran)	Oct 2007	May 2008	24	8	11	5	33.4%	(07-08) 6th
Mansour Ebrahimzadeh	(Iran)	Jul 2008	Jun 2012	134	62	48	24	46.3%	(08-09) 2nd, (09-10) 2nd,(10–11) 3rd, (11-12) 6th
Rasoul Korbekandi	(Iran)	Jun 2012	Oct 2012	11	3	1	7	27.3%	15th (until week 11)
Farhad Kazemi	(Iran)	Oct 2012	Jul 2013	23	6	10	7	26%	(12–13) 14th
Mahmoud Yavari	(Iran)	Jun 2013	Jul 2013	2	1	1	0	50%	Win in the Relegation play-offs
Luka Bonačić	(Croatia)	Jul 2013	Jan 2014	20	3	7	10	15%	14th (until week 20)
Mojtaba Taghavi	(Iran)	Jan 2014	Feb 2014	7	1	4	2	14.3%	15th (until week 27)
Firouz Karimi	(Iran)	Feb 2014	Jun 2014	4	3	0	1	75%	(13–14) 13th
Yahya Golmohammadi	(Iran)	Jun 2014	Sep 2016	67	26	26	15	38.8%	(14–15) 4th (15–16) 6th (16–17) 14th (until week 7)
Mojtaba Hosseini	(Iran)	Sep 2016	Jun 2017	23	11	7	5	47.8%	(16–17) 4th
Amir Ghalenoei	(Iran)	Jun 2017	Jun 2018	30	15	10	5	50.0%	(17-18) 2nd
Omid Namazi	(United States)	Jun 2018	Nov 2018	11	2	5	4	18.1%	(18–19) 11th (until week 11)
Alireza Mansourian	(Iran)	Nov 2018	Dec 2019	35	10	14	11	36.8%	(18-19) 6th (19–20) 11th (until week 16)
Miodrag Radulović	(Montenegro)	Jan 2020	Jun 2020	5	2	1	2	40%	(19–20) 11th (until week 21)
Luka Bonačić	(Croatia)	Jun 2020	Aug 2020	9	2	2	5	22.2%	(19–20) 12th
Rahman Rezaei	(Iran)	Sep 2020	Feb 2021	15	1	8	6	6.6%	(20–21) 14th (until week 15)
Mojtaba Hosseini	(Iran)	Mar 2021	Aug 2021	12	3	3	6	25%	(20–21) 14th
Mehdi Tartar	(Iran)	Aug 2021	Present	30	10	7	13	30%	(21–22) 7th

==== Current coaching staff ====
Position	Name
Head coach	(Iran) Abdollah Veisi
Assistant coaches	(Iran) Hossein Pashaei (Iran) Mohammad Salsali (Iran) Mohammad Nouri
Goalkeeping coach	(Iran) Hossein Inanlou
Fitness coach	(Iran) Amir Jamali
Analyst	(Iran) Kianoush Forouzesh
Physiotherapist	(Iran) Abbas Moradi (Iran) Behzad Moradi
Doctor	(Iran) Amir Hossein Sharifianpour
Logistics	(Iran) Mahmoud Mehruyan
Team Manager	(Iran) Mahmoud Yazdkhasti
B team Head Coach	(Iran) Mehdi Rajabzadeh
Media Officer	(Iran) Ehsan Baeedi

=== Chairpersons ===
Chairperson	Tenure
(Iran) Mohammad Mehdi Taghizadeh	July 1969 – July 1977
(Iran) Mostafa Ghanei	July 1977 – February 1979
(Iran) Asghar Nilchian	May 1979 – May 1984
(Iran) Fazollah Omranian	May 1984 – May 1988
(Iran) Heydar Taheri	May 1988 – May 1992
(Iran) Nematollah Zargar	May 1992 – June 1996
(Iran) Alireza Shogi	June 1996 – June 2004
(Iran) Saeed Azari	June 2004 – June 2009
(Iran) Asghar Dalili	June 2009 – August 2011
(Iran) Khosro Ebrahimi	August 2011 – September 2013
(Iran) Saeed Azari	September 2013 – August 2019
(Iran) Javad Mohammadi	August 2019 – January 2020
(Iran) Ahmad Jamshidi	January 2020 – September 2020
(Iran) Javad Mohammadi	September 2020 – January 2021
(Iran) Mojtaba Fereydouni	January 2021 – July 2023
(Iran) Nima Nakisa	July 2023 – present

== Season-by-season ==
For details on seasons, see List of Zob Ahan F.C. seasons

The table below chronicles the achievements of Zob Ahan since 1973.

Season	League	Position	Hazfi Cup	ACL	Notes
1973–74	Takht Jamshid Cup	10th	Not held	did not qualify	
1974–75	Takht Jamshid Cup	11th	Not held	did not qualify	
1975–76	Takht Jamshid Cup	9th	1/8 Final	did not qualify	
1976–77	Takht Jamshid Cup	15th	1/16 Final	did not qualify	
1977–78	Takht Jamshid Cup	8th	Not held	did not qualify	
1978–79	Takht Jamshid Cup	N/A	Not held	did not qualify	did not finish
1981–82	Isfahan's 2nd Division	1st	Not held	did not qualify	Promoted
1983–84	Isfahan League	3rd	Not held	did not qualify	
1984–85	Isfahan League	2nd	Not held	did not qualify	
1991–92	Isfahan League	5th		did not qualify	
1993–94	Azadegan League	4th	1/8 Final	did not qualify	
1994–95	Azadegan League	8th	1/16 Final	did not qualify	Relegated
1995–96	2nd Division	2nd	1/8 Final	did not qualify	Promoted
1996–97	Azadegan League	10th	1/8 Final	did not qualify	
1997–98	Azadegan League	3rd	Not held	did not qualify	
1998–99	Azadegan League	12th	Third Round	did not qualify	
1999–00	Azadegan League	5th	First Round	did not qualify	
2000–01	Azadegan League	4th	Final		
2001–02	Iran Pro League	6th	Quarterfinal		
2002–03	Iran Pro League	8th	Cup		
2003–04	Iran Pro League	4th	Semi-Final	First Round	
2004–05	Iran Pro League	2nd	1/8 Final	did not qualify	
2005–06	Iran Pro League	6th	1/8 Final	did not qualify	
2006–07	Iran Pro League	8th	1/16 Final	did not qualify	
2007–08	Iran Pro League	6th	1/8 Final	did not qualify	
2008–09	Iran Pro League	2nd	Cup	did not qualify	
2009–10	Iran Pro League	2nd	Semi-Final	Runner-up	
2010–11	Iran Pro League	3rd	1/16 Final	1/4 Final	
2011–12	Iran Pro League	6th	1/8 Final	Play-off	
2012–13	Iran Pro League	14th	1/4 Final	did not qualify	
2013–14	Iran Pro League	13th	1/4 Final	did not qualify	
2014–15	Iran Pro League	4th	Cup	did not qualify	
2015–16	Iran Pro League	6th	Cup	1/8 Final	Super Cup
2016–17	Iran Pro League	4th	Semi-Final	First Round	
2017–18	Iran Pro League	2nd	1/16 Final	1/8 Final	
2018–19	Iran Pro League	6th	1/16 Final	1/8 Final	
2019–20	Iran Pro League	12th	1/16 Final	did not qualify	
2020–21	Iran Pro League	14th	1/16 Final	did not qualify	
2021–22	Iran Pro League	7th	1/16 Final	did not qualify	
2022–23	Iran Pro League	9th	1/16 Final	did not qualify	
2023–24	Iran Pro League	5th	1/16 Final	did not qualify	

== Individual records ==
Lists of the players with the most caps and top goalscorers for the club, (players in bold signifies current Zob Ahan player). This list includes goals from Iran Premier League.

=== Most appearances ===
As of 6 May 2020
	Name	Nationality	position	total
1	Ghasem Haddadifar	Iran	Midfielder	410
2	Mehdi Rajabzadeh	Iran	Forward	348
3	Rasoul Korbekandi	Iran	Goalkeeper	308
4	Esmaeil Farhadi	Iran	Forward	303
5	Mohammad Salsali	Iran	Defender	235
6	Sepehr Heidari	Iran	Defender	183
7	Morteza Tabrizi	Iran	Forward	178
8	Rashid Mazaheri	Iran	Goalkeeper	175
9	Mohammad Mansouri	Iran	Midfielder	163
9	Sina Ashouri	Iran	Midfielder	163

=== Top Goalscorers ===
As of 6 May 2019
Player		Appearances	Goals
1	(Iran) Mehdi Rajabzadeh	348	106
2	(Iran) Morteza Tabrizi	178	54
3	(Iran) Reza Sahebi	147	49
4	(Iran) Esmaeil Farhadi	303	47
5	(Iran) Mohammad Reza Khalatbari	160	44
6	(Brazil) Igor Castro	153	42
7	(Iran) Mohammad Ghazi	111	28
8	(Iran) Mohammad Hosseini	111	25
9	(Iran) Ghasem Haddadifar	410	22
10	(Iran) Mohsen Mosalman	157	21

=== Top Scorers by season ===
Season	Player	Goals
2001–02	(Iran) Reza Sahebi	7
2002–03	(Iran) Reza Sahebi	6
2003–04	(Iran) Mehdi Rajabzadeh	9
2004–05	(Iran) Mehdi Rajabzadeh	8
2005–06	(Iran) Mehdi Rajabzadeh	14
2006–07	(Iran) Mehdi Rajabzadeh	17
2007–08	(Iran) Esmaeil Farhadi	9
2008–09	(Brazil) Igor Castro	16
2009–10	(Iran) Mohammad Reza Khalatbari	11
2010–11	(Iran) Seyed Mohammad Hosseini	12
2011–12	(Iran) Mohammad Ghazi	7
2012–13	(Iran) Mehdi Rajabzadeh	8
2013–14	(Iran) Mehdi Rajabzadeh	9
2014–15	(Iran) Masoud Hassanzadeh	9
2015–16	(Iran) Morteza Tabrizi	7
2016–17	(Iran) Morteza Tabrizi	11
2017–18	(Iran) Morteza Tabrizi	13
2018–19	(Iran) Amir Arsalan Motahari	6

== Asian record ==

Zob Ahan's starting line-up Final against Seongnam, 2010 AFC Champions League

=== Asian Club Championship / AFC Champions League ===
Asian Club Championship / AFC Champions League
Season	Round	Rival	Home	Away	Rank/Agg.	Notes
2004	Group stage (Group A)	(Uzbekistan) Pakhtakor	1–0	2–0	2	
2004	Group stage (Group A)	Qatar SC	3–3	0–0	2	
2004	Group stage (Group A)	(Bahrain) Riffa	–	–	2	
2010	Group stage (Group B)	(United Arab Emirates) Al-Wahda	1–0	1–0	1	Runners-up
2010	Group stage (Group B)	(Saudi Arabia) Al-Ittihad	1–0	2–2	1	Runners-up
2010	Group stage (Group B)	(Uzbekistan) Bunyodkor	3–0	0–1	1	Runners-up
2010	Round of 16	(Iran) Mes Kerman	1–0	–	1–0	Runners-up
2010	Quarter-finals	(South Korea) Pohang Steelers	2–1	1–1	3–2	Runners-up
2010	Semi-finals	(Saudi Arabia) Al-Hilal	1–0	0–1	2–0	Runners-up
2010	Final	(South Korea) Seongnam Ilhwa Chunma	–	–	1–3	Runners-up
2011	Group stage (Group D)	(United Arab Emirates) Emirates	2–1	0–1	1	
2011	Group stage (Group D)	(Saudi Arabia) Al-Shabab	0–1	0–0	1	
2011	Group stage (Group D)	(Qatar) Al-Rayyan	1–0	1–3	1	
2011	Round of 16	(Saudi Arabia) Al-Nassr	4–1	–	4–1	
2011	Quarter-finals	(South Korea) Suwon Samsung Bluewings	1–2	1–1	2–3	
2012	Qualifying play-off	(Iran) Esteghlal	–	2–0	2–0	Not Qualify
2016	Group stage (Group B)	(Qatar) Lekhwiya	0–0	0–1	1	
2016	Group stage (Group B)	(Uzbekistan) Bunyodkor	5–2	0–0	1	
2016	Group stage (Group B)	(Saudi Arabia) Al-Nassr	3–0	0–3	1	
2016	Round of 16	(United Arab Emirates) Al-Ain	0–2	1–1	1–3	
2017	Group stage (Group C)	(United Arab Emirates) Al-Ain	0–3	1–1	3	
2017	Group stage (Group C)	(Saudi Arabia) Al-Ahli	1–2	2–0	3	
2017	Group stage (Group C)	(Uzbekistan) Bunyodkor	2–1	0–2	3	
2018	Qualifying play-off	(India) Aizawl	3–1	–	3–1	Qualify
2018	Group stage (Group B)	(United Arab Emirates) Al Wahda	2–0	3–0	2	
2018	Group stage (Group B)	(Uzbekistan) Lokomotiv	2–0	1–1	2	
2018	Group stage (Group B)	(Qatar) Al-Duhail	0–1	3–1	2	
2018	Round of 16	(Iran) Esteghlal	1–0	3–1	3–2	
2019	Preliminary round 2	Al-Kuwait	1–0	–	1–0	Qualify
2019	Qualifying play-off	(Qatar) Al-Gharafa	–	2–3	3–2	Qualify
2019	Group stage (Group A)	(Iraq) Al-Zawraa	0–0	2–2	1	
2019	Group stage (Group A)	(United Arab Emirates) Al-Wasl	2–0	1–3	1	
2019	Group stage (Group A)	(Saudi Arabia) Al-Nassr	0–0	2–3	1	
2019	Round of 16	(Saudi Arabia) Al-Ittihad	3–4	2–1	4–6	

== Club honours ==
=== Domestic ===
- 1st Division/Persian Gulf Pro League
  - Runners-up (4): 2004–05, 2008–09, 2009–10, 2017–18
- Hazfi Cup
  - Winners (4): 2002–03, 2008–09, 2014–15, 2015–16
  - Runners-up (1): 2000–01
- Super Cup
  - Winners (1): 2016

=== Continental ===
- AFC Champions League Elite
  - Runners-up (1): 2010

== Ownership ==
The owner of the Zob Ahan FC is Isfahan Steel Company. Company is the first Iranian steel maker opened in late 1960, based close to the cities of Fooladshahr and Zarrinshahr, Isfahan Province.

Zob Ahan-e Esfahan and Iran's first car manufacturer, Iran National (renamed Iran Khodro after the Iranian revolution) were parts of a move from mainly agriculture-based economy toward industrialization by the pre-revolutionary government of Amir Abbas Hoveida.

Achievements
Preceded by Esteghlal F.C.	Hazfi Cup Champions; 2002–03	Succeeded by Sepahan F.C.
Preceded by Esteghlal F.C.	IPL Runner-up; 2004–05	Succeeded by PAS Tehran
Preceded by Sepahan F.C.	IPL Runner-up; 2008–09	Succeeded by Holders
Preceded by Esteghlal F.C.	Hazfi Cup Champions; 2008–09	Succeeded by Perspolis F.C.
Preceded by Holders	IPL Runner-up; 2009–10	Succeeded by Esteghlal F.C.
Preceded by Al-Ittihad	ACL Runner-up; 2010	Succeeded by Jeonbuk
Preceded by Tractor	Hazfi Cup Champions; 2014–15	Succeeded by Holders
Preceded by Holders	Hazfi Cup Champions; 2015–16	Succeeded by Naft Tehran F.C.
Preceded by Esteghlal F.C.	IPL Runner-up; 2017–18	Succeeded by Sepahan F.C.
