= Rahman Rezaei =

Iranian football player and coach

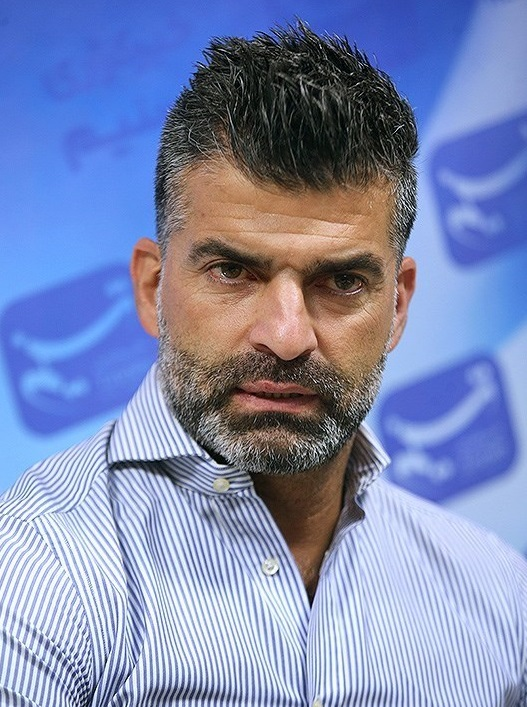
- Rezaei in 2020

Personal information
- Full name: Rahman Rezaei
- Date of birth: 20 February 1975 (age 51)
- Place of birth: Noor, Mazandaran, Iran
- Height: 1.87 m (6 ft 1 1/2 in)
- Position: Centre-back

Youth career
- 1991–1995: Nassaji Mazandaran

Senior career*
Years	Team	Apps	(Gls)
1995–1996	Bargh Tehran		
1996	Rah Ahan		
1996–2001	Zob Ahan		
2001–2003	Perugia	38	(5)
2003–2006	Messina	107	(2)
2006–2008	Livorno	21	(1)
2008–2009	Persepolis	13	(0)
2009–2010	Al Ahli	9	(1)
2010–2011	Shahin Bushehr	6	(0)
2011–2012	Paykan		

International career
2001–2009	Iran	54	(3)

Managerial career
- 2013–2014: Paykan (youth)
- 2014–2015: Rah Ahan (youth)
- 2016–2017: Tractor Sazi (assistant)
- 2018–2019: Bargh Jadid
- 2019–2020: Rayka Babol
- 2020–2021: Zob Ahan
- 2023–: Iran (assistant)
- * Club domestic league appearances and goals

Rahman Rezaei (Persian: رحمان رضايی, born 20 February 1975) is an Iranian football coach and former player. A centre-back, he also represented the Iran national team.

== Club career ==
He was originally discovered by Iranian manager, Nasser Hejazi. Rezaei played for Zob Ahan in Isfahan for five seasons. After impressive performances for the club and the national team, he was transferred to Perugia for €150,000 and then to Messina.

Rahman Rezaei is currently the most successful Asian defender in Europe. In the 2003/2004 season, he helped Messina gain promotion to Serie A. He had been one of Messina's most consistently used players with 36 appearances in their 2004–05 mid-table finish. After steadily playing for his club for three seasons, at the end of August 2006 Rezaei signed with another Serie A club, Livorno.

He has won numerous plaudits in Italy and has been dubbed "The Flying Carpet". In addition, his fans in Messina have named him the "Secretary of Defense". In January 2006, he acquired Italian citizenship through his marriage to an Italian-Iranian Helia Hashemi.

In July 2008, an Iranian newspaper reported Iranian giants Persepolis were holding talks with Rezaei. However, in mid-July, Afshin Ghotbi was re-appointed manager of Persepolis and cut the talks with Rezaei, stating that the club were not looking for a centre-back player at that moment in time.

On 10 August 2009, Rezaei signed a one-year, $700 thousand contract with Qatari side Al Ahli SC. In 2010, he signed with Shahin Bushehr. A half-year later he joined Paykan. He announced his retirement from football on 4 July 2012.

== Club career statistics ==
As of 18 May 2019

Club performance			League		Cup		Continental		Total	
Season	Club	League	Apps	Goals	Apps	Goals	Apps	Goals	Apps	Goals
Iran			League		Hazfi Cup		Asia		Total	
1996–97	Zob Ahan	Azadegan League					–			
1997–98	Zob Ahan	Azadegan League					–			
1998–99	Zob Ahan	Azadegan League	22	7			–			
1999–00	Zob Ahan	Azadegan League					–			
2000–01	Zob Ahan	Azadegan League	29	2			–			
Italy			League		Coppa Italia		Europe		Total	
2001–02	Perugia	Serie A	25	2	1	0	–		26	2
2002–03	Perugia	Serie A	13	3	1	0	0	0	14	3
2003–04	Messina	Serie B	37	2	0	0	–		37	2
2004–05	Messina	Serie A	36	0	1	0	–		37	0
2005–06	Messina	Serie A	34	0	0	0	–		34	0
2006–07	Messina	Serie A	0	0	2	0	–		2	0
2006–07	Livorno	Serie A	16	1	1	0	3	0	20	1
2007–08	Livorno	Serie A	5	0	0	0	–		5	0
Iran			League		Hazfi Cup		Asia		Total	
2008–09	Persepolis	Persian Gulf Pro League	13	0	3	0	4	0	20	0
Qatar			League		Emir of Qatar Cup		Asia		Total	
2009–10	Al Ahli SC	Qatar Stars League	9	1			–			
Iran			League		Hazfi Cup		Asia		Total	
2010–11	Shahin	Persian Gulf Pro League	6	0	0	0	–		6	0
2010–11	Paykan	Persian Gulf Pro League	13	1	0	0	–		13	1
2011–12	Paykan	Azadegan League					–			
Total	Iran						4	0		
Total	Italy		166	8	6	0	3	0	175	8
Total	Qatar		9	1			–			
Career total							7	0		

== International career ==
Rahman Rezaei made his first appearance for Iran in July 2001 against Bosnia. He has been the most consistent defender for the team ever since.

In European football, Rahman Rezaei is considered a solid defender well inclined to launch devastating counterattacks. However his role is different in the Iranian national football team, where he is a straight defensive centre back. He was formerly a forward, but has proved to be an indispensable defensive stalwart for an Iranian side considered top-heavy in attacking players.

He was among the key players for Iran in World Cup 2006, but he did not perform as well as everyone had hoped. He received some criticism following a couple mistakes which led to goals being scored against the team.

On 6 April 2007 Rezaei stated he will retire from international football after the 2007 Asian Cup., but in another interview in December 2007 he expressed his intention to return to the national team. Rezaei was given his #5 jersey and was selected for Team Melli's 2010 World Cup Qualification matches.

Iran national team
Year	Apps	Goals
2001	16	0
2002	3	1
2003	5	0
2004	10	0
2005	6	1
2006	8	1
2007	6	0
Total	54	3

=== International goals ===
Scores and results list Iran's goal tally first.

#	Date	Venue	Opponent	Score	Result	Competition
1	30 May 2002	Sabah Al Salem Stadium, Kuwait City	Kuwait	2–1	3–1	Friendly
2	3 June 2005	Azadi Stadium, Tehran	North Korea	1–0	1–0	2006 FIFA World Cup qualification
3	28 May 2006	Azadi Stadium, Tehran	Bosnia and Herzegovina	2–2	5–2	Friendly

=== Director of football ===
after time of playing he was director sport and coach in some clubs.

#	season	club	position
1	2011–2012	Paykan F.C.	Director of football
2	2012–2013	Persepolis F.C.	Director of football
3	2020	Zob Ahan F.C.	Director of football

== Honours ==
=== Individual ===
- Asian Cup All-Star Team: 2007

== Personal life ==
Rezaei is married to translator H. Hashemian, a woman of Iranian origin who was born in Assisi, Perugia.
