= Mahmood Ebrahimzadeh =

Iranian footballer and manager

Personal information
- Full name: Mahmood Ebrahimzadeh
- Date of birth: 22 December 1953 (age 72)
- Place of birth: Bushehr, Iran
- Position: Centre forward

Senior career*
Years	Team	Apps	(Gls)
1971–1975	Shahin Bushehr		
1975–1977	FC Aboomoslem	?	(11)
1977–1980	Zobahan F.C.		
1980–1984	VfL Wolfsburg		
1984–1985	1. FC Göttingen 05	27	(12)
1985–1986	VfL Wolfsburg	19	(10)

International career
1977–1980	Iran	5	(2)

Managerial career
- 2002–2003: Bargh Shiraz
- * Club domestic league appearances and goals

Mahmood Ebrahimzadeh (Persian: محمود ابراهيم زاده; born 22 December 1957) is a retired Iranian footballer and now football coach. In 1980, during the Iran–Iraq War, he left Iran and went to Germany. He is now an American citizen.

== Playing career ==
Ebrahimzadeh is one of the most famous footballers to come from Bushehr, he started his football career with Shahin Bushehr. He then played for Iranian club FC Aboomoslem during 1975/76 season where he scored 11 goals, and was captain of Zobahan F.C. in 1976/77 season.

In the 1980s, he played in Germany for four years most notably for VfL Wolfsburg.

He made his debut for Iran national football team on 18 November 1977 against Hong Kong as a substitute, during a 1978 FIFA World Cup qualification.

== Managerial career ==
He coached for A.C. Milan, Ajax F.C. and Santos F.C. football academies.
