= Zoran Đorđević (football manager) =

Serbian football manager

Personal information
- Full name: Zoran Đorđević
- Date of birth: 13 February 1952 (age 74)
- Place of birth: Veliki Jovanovac, FPR Yugoslavia
- Position: Midfielder

Managerial career
- Years: Team
- 1978–1980: Radnički Pirot
- 1981–1982: Oman Club
- 1982–1983: Al-Fahaheel
- 1983–1985: Qadsia
- 1985: Khaitan
- 1985–1990: Qadsia
- 1991: Al-Ittihad
- 1991: Trudbenik
- 1991: Al-Ahli
- 1992: Al-Muharraq
- 1992–1994: Al Hilal
- 1994–1996: Al-Sahel
- 1996–1998: Al-Nasr
- 1998–1999: Al-Ahli
- 1999: Yemen
- 2000: Sudan
- 2000–2001: Timok
- 2001–2002: Qatar SC
- 2002: Qadsia
- 2002–2004: Al Wehda
- 2004–2005: Al-Riyadh
- 2007–2008: Zob Ahan
- 2008–2009: Churchill Brothers
- 2010: Bangladesh
- 2010–2011: Al-Majd
- 2011–2012: Philippines Olympic
- 2012–2013: South Sudan

Zoran Đorđević
Medal record

Men's Football (Coach)

South Asian Games
| Gold medal – first place | 2010 Dhaka | Bangladesh NT |

Zoran Đorđević (Serbian Cyrillic: Зоран Ђорђевић; born 13 February 1952) is a Serbian international football manager. During his 40-year career, he has coached multiple national and first-league teams across Asia and Africa.

Đorđević was the subject of the 2013 documentary Coach Zoran and His African Tigers, describing his attempts to give a head start to the recently formed South Sudan national football team.

== Profile ==
Đorđević was the head coach of Bangladesh national football team with whom he became champion at the 2010 South Asian Games. He led Bangladesh to their first gold medal in 11 years at this competition, creating history by setting two new records: 4–0 victory vs. Afghanistan is the biggest winning margin in the final in the 26-year history of this competition and becoming champion without a single goal conceded in the tournament. Before this he was the head coach of Churchill Brothers SC in the Indian Professional League, the I-League. Đorđević was the first foreign coach to become champion of India when Churchill Brothers won the 2008–09 I-League, their first national league title in club history, after finishing as runners-up on four previous occasions. He is also the first foreigner to receive the S. A. Rahim Trophy for the best coach of the year from the All India Football Federation. FIFA and President Sepp Blatter sent a congratulatory letter to Đorđević for this achievement. Additionally he led the club to become state champions of Goa and reached qualification for the AFC Champions League for the first time.

== National team coaching career ==
- Head Coach of Bangladesh national football team at 2010 South Asian Games – 1st place, Gold Medal (gold)

(5 matches played, 5 wins, 0 draws, 0 losses, 13 goals scored, 0 goals conceded, no red card)
Group Matches: Bangladesh 3–0 Nepal, Bangladesh 4–0 Bhutan, Bangladesh 1:0 Maldives, Semifinal: Bangladesh 1–0 India, Final: Bangladesh 4–0 Afghanistan
New record 4–0 victory in final of the competition – first gold medal for Bangladesh after 11 years
First time team becoming champion without a single goal conceded in tournament 26-year history

- Head Coach of Sudan national football team for 2002 FIFA World Cup Korea/Japan – Qualifiers

Preliminary Playoff: (H) Sudan 1–0 Mozambique, (A) Mozambique 2–1 Sudan (2–2 Sudan qualified on away goals rule for Group B with Nigeria, Ghana, Liberia, Sierra Leone)

- Head Coach of Yemen national football team for 2000 AFC Asian Cup Lebanon – Qualifiers

(Best results: Yemen 3–0 Nepal, Yemen 11–2 Bhutan)

Đorđević was appointed head coach of the Philippines U-21's in January 2012.

== Club coaching career ==
On 9 June 2007 Đorđević signed a contract with IPL club F.C. Zob Ahan for the 2007–08 season following the departure of Rasoul Korbekandi who resigned due to health issues. He was sacked in October 2007 following unsatisfactory results in the 2007–08 Iran Pro League season. Coach Đorđević removed from the starting lineup some experienced players who did not fit into his concept and promoted from the youth team a 17-year-old goalkeeper Mohammad Bagher Sadeghi and 16-year-old Mohsen Mosalman who became the youngest player ever to score a goal against Persepolis F.C. – the most successful and biggest club in Iran. His disagreements with the club management over player selection led to his departure from the club, claiming he wanted to build a champion team at a club which never finished higher than 5th position in the Iranian League. After coach Đorđević's departure, in the very next season Zob Ahan club won the national cup which was their second trophy in club history and narrowly lost the league on the final match of the season, finishing 2nd on goal difference. People in Esfahan today praise Z. Đorđević for his farsighted vision and his contribution of launching the careers of talented young players who reached the Iran national team. Tomislav Savic, the former goalkeeper coach of Atletico Madrid who was brought to the club by head coach Đorđević, received the best goalkeeper coach award in Iran in 2008–09 and still remains with the club into his fourth season.

On 5 February 2007 Đorđević was appointed head-coach of UAE 2nd Division side Al-Rams. In the first half of the 2006–07 season, the club was at the bottom of the standings with only one point and had not registered a single win (15 matches, 0 wins, 1 draw, 14 losses) which led to the dismissal of their Egyptian coach. After coach Zoran's arrival in mid-season, he managed to revitalize the team (5 wins, 2 draws, 8 losses, 17 points). He created a sensational result when with the bottom club Al-Rams won 4–3 against the league leaders Ajman Club who were until then favourites for promotion to UAE Premier League.

2008–09 Churchill Brothers SC

- First Foreign Coach India League Champion
- First Foreigner to receive the Best Coach of the year award in India
- Received a congratulation letter from FIFA President Joseph Sepp Blatter for this unique achievement
- Qualification for AFC Champions League – First National League Title in Club history
- Goa Vodafone Pro-League Champion
- India Federation Cup semifinal, Super Cup final
- Churchill Brothers SC 9–1 victory over Vasco SC is the record biggest winning margin in I-League history

== Coach Zoran and His African Tigers ==
During 2012, Đorđević was the subject of a documentary by British filmmaker Sam Benstead. The documentary looked at Đorđević's time at South Sudan national football team in which he led South Sudan to a 2–2 draw with Uganda in their inaugural FIFA recognised international friendly and their campaign in the 2012 CECAFA Cup.

== Video ==
- South Asian Games 2010 Final – Bangladesh 4:0 Afghanistan, 2/8/2010 on YouTube
- Bangladesh Final Preparation, 2/7/2010 on YouTube
- South Asian Games 2010 Semifinal – Bangladesh 1:0 India, 2/6/2010 on YouTube
- South Asian Games 2010 Group Match – Bangladesh 1:0 Maldives, 2/3/2010 on YouTube
- Ђорђевић: Желим титулу светског шампиона, August 23, 2009
