= Mojtaba Hosseini =

Iranian footballer (born 1974)

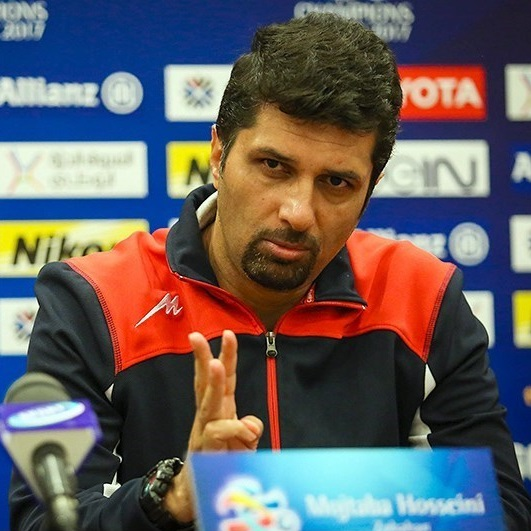
- Hosseini in 2017

Personal information
- Date of birth: 5 May 1974 (age 52)
- Place of birth: Amol, Iran
- Position: Forward

Team information
- Current team: Mes Shahr-e Babak (Manager)

Youth career
- 1988–1993: Bank Melli

Senior career*
Years	Team	Apps	(Gls)
1993–2003	Zob Ahan		

Managerial career
- 2010–2012: Nassaji Mazandaran (assistant)
- 2012: Saba Qom (assistant)
- 2012–2013: Persepolis (assistant)
- 2013–2014: Naft Tehran (assistant)
- 2014–2016: Zob Ahan (assistant)
- 2016–2017: Zob Ahan
- 2017–2018: Tractor (assistant)
- 2018–2019: Oxin Alborz
- 2019–2020: Mes Kerman
- 2020–2021: Naft Masjed Soleyman
- 2021: Zob Ahan
- 2021–2023: Paykan
- 2023–2026: Aluminium Arak
- 2026: Nassaji Mazandaran
- 2026–: Mes Shahr-e Babak
- * Club domestic league appearances and goals

Mojtaba Hosseini (Persian: مجتبی حسینی, born 5 May 1974) is an Iranian football coach and former player who is the manager of Mes Shahr-e Babak. He started his youth career with Bank Melli and continue with Zob Ahan. Six years after his retirement, he began his coaching spell as the assistant coach at Nassaji. After Golmohammadi take overs the reins of Saba in June 2012, he became the assistant coach of Saba but resigned from his position in January 2013 to join to the Golmohammadi's technical staff at Persepolis.

== Managerial record ==
As of 15 October 2016

Team	From	To	Record					
Team	From	To	M	W	D	L	Win %	Ref.
Zob Ahan	24 September 2016	Present	2	1	1	0	50.00	
Total			2	1	1	0	50.00	—
