= Isfahan Province League =

Isfahan Province league
- Country: Iran
- Confederation: AFC
- Number of clubs: 10
- Level on pyramid: 5
- Promotion to: 3rd Division
- Relegation to: Isfahan Province league 2
- Domestic cup(s): Hazfi Cup
- Broadcaster(s): IRIB

Isfahan Provincial League is the premier football league of Isfahan Province and is 5th in the Iranian football pyramid after the 3rd Division.It is part of the Vision Asia program.
