= Mojtaba Taghavi =

Iranian footballer and coach

Personal information
- Full name: Mojtaba Taghavi
- Date of birth: February 2, 1968 (age 58)
- Place of birth: Abadan, Iran
- Position: Forward

Youth career
- 1987–1989: Shahin
- 1989–1991: Saipa

Senior career*
| Years | Team | Apps | (Gls) |
| 1991–2002 | Saipa | | |

Managerial career
- 2004–2006: Saipa (Assistant)
- 2007–2008: Sanat Naft (Assistant)
- 2008–2009: Sanat Naft
- 2009–2010: Oghab
- 2011–2012: Saipa Shomal
- 2012–2013: Saipa
- 2014: Zob Ahan
- 2016: Pars Jam Bushehr
- * Club domestic league appearances and goals

Mojtaba Taghavi (Persian: مجتبی تقوی, born February 2, 1968) is an Iranian former footballer who became a football coach after retiring as a player. He is currently technical manager at Naft Masjed Soleyman.

== Career ==
After the dismissal of Saipa head coach Majid Saleh in February 2012, he was appointed as the club's head coach on 1 March 2012 and signed a contract until the end of upcoming season. On 15 May 2012, Mojtaba Taghavi agreed to extend his contract with Saipa to the end of 2012–13 season. He left the team at the end of the season after finished 9th. On 1 June 2013, he signed a contract with Mes Kerman but he resigned as coach just days before the start of the new season after he was attacked by fans of his own club at a training session. On 16 December 2013, he signed a contract with Zob Ahan to become the club's head coach effective from 1 January 2014. He was sacked by the club on 25 February 2014, just two months after his appointment.
