= Bahram Atef =

Iranian football manager and academic

Personal information
- Full name: Bahram Atef
- Date of birth: February 2, 1941 (age 85)
- Place of birth: Isfahan, Iran

Managerial career
- Years: Team
- 1970–1971: Daraei
- 1971: Zob Ahan
- 1975–1980: Shahin
- 1988–1993: University of Science and Technology
- 1993–2001: University of Science and Technology
- 2001–2002: Zob Ahan
- 2002–2003: Esteghlal Ahvaz

Bahram Atef (Persian: بهرام عاطف, born 2 February 1941 in Tehran, Iran) is an Iranian football manager and academic. He coached Zob Ahan and Esteghlal Ahvaz. He is current technical manager of Zob Ahan.
