= Luka Bonačić =

Croatian footballer & coach (born 1955)

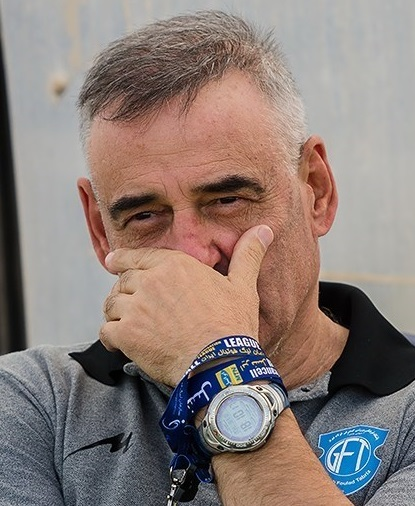
- Bonačić in 2017

Personal information
- Full name: Luka Bonačić
- Date of birth: 21 March 1955 (age 71)
- Place of birth: Split, FPR Yugoslavia
- Position: Midfielder

Senior career*
Years	Team	Apps	(Gls)
1971–1974	Hajduk Split	45	(8)
1973–1974	→ Šibenik (loan)	15	(2)
1974–1975	Grasshopper Zürich	13	(4)
1976–1978	Maribor	9	(0)
1977–1978	→ Hajduk Split (loan)	0	(0)
1979–1980	VfL Bochum	10	(0)
1980–1981	Málaga	22	(5)
1981–1982	Hajduk Split	7	(0)
1983–1984	Šibenik	10	(1)
1985	Footscray JUST	9	(3)
1986	Melbourne Croatia	0	(0)

Managerial career
- 1988–1989: Central United
- 1991–1992: Dubrovnik
- 1992–1993: Pazinka
- 1993–1994: Zadar
- 1994–1995: Neretva
- 1995–1996: Varteks
- 1996: Rijeka
- 1996–1997: Osijek
- 1997–1998: Hajduk Split
- 1998–1999: Slaven Belupo
- 1999–2000: GOŠK Dubrovnik
- 2000: Varteks
- 2000–2001: Mura
- 2001–2002: Hrvatski Dragovoljac
- 2002–2003: Šibenik
- 2003–2004: Foolad
- 2004–2005: Esteghlal Ahvaz
- 2005: Dinamo Tirana
- 2006: Hajduk Split
- 2006–2008: Sepahan
- 2008–2009: Al-Nasr Dubai
- 2009: Foolad
- 2009–2010: Mes Kerman
- 2010–2011: Gostaresh
- 2011: Sepahan
- 2012: NK Zagreb
- 2013: Mes Kerman
- 2013–2014: Zob Ahan
- 2014: Mes Kerman
- 2014–2016: Al-Shahania
- 2016: Al Ahli
- 2017: Gostaresh
- 2017–2018: Al-Arabi
- 2019–2020: Varaždin
- 2020: Zob Ahan
- * Club domestic league appearances and goals

Luka Bonačić (pronounced [lûːka bɔ̌natʃitɕ]; born 21 March 1955) is a Croatian football coach and former professional player.

== Early life ==
He was born in Split, Croatia that was then part of Socialist Federal Republic of Yugoslavia. He began his football career at the Split Football Academy. He joined Hajduk Split in 1969 when he was 14.

== Playing career ==
He signed a pro contract with Hajduk in 1971. He played 45 games for club and scored eight goals. He joined Grasshopper Club Zürich in 1979, but after one year he transferred to VfL Bochum. CD Málaga and Footscray JUST were Bonačić's next clubs. He retired after playing for Melbourne Croatia in 1986. He was called up for the Croatia national team in 1982 but never played.

== Coaching career ==
Bonačić is known as coach who gives young talented players a chance. In the 1992–93 season, when he was NK Pazinka coach, he launched the career of Dado Prso, the former Rangers and Monaco striker. Also whilst at Slaven Belupo, he started the career of young central defender Ivica Križanac who currently plays for FC Zenit in Russia.

He was selected as Croatian Coach of the Year in 1996 when he reached the final of the Croatian Cup with middle-class Croatian club NK Varteks. In 1996, he won with Varteks against Dinamo Zagreb 4–3.

Thanks to his success with NK Varteks, in the 1997–98 season he became head coach of top Croatian club Hajduk Split. Soon after Bonačić's appointment, however, the management board named coach Tomislav Ivić as Bonačić's assistant. Ivić preferred defensive football and young coach Bonačić preferred attacking football. As a result, the team had a conflict of tactics.

After ten match days, Hajduk had won nine and lost only one match which made them leading the Croatian Championship with eight points advantage ahead of second ranking Dinamo Zagreb. The management board of Hajduk Split (controlled by Franjo Tuđman's assistants) decided to fire Bonačić and promoted Ivić to head coach. After two months, Hajduk had lost many points under Ivić and the management sacked him and asked Bonačić to return. Bonačić returned, but due to the points lost under Ivić, he could only manage a respectable second behind Dinamo Zagreb.

Bonačić is known as coach who doesn't like officials of clubs to decide which player will be in the starting eleven. On a few occasions he has left Croatian and foreign clubs when some presidents of clubs have tried to impose him which players "must" play in the first team. In 2006, he was attacked by a group of people whilst returning to his flat in Split. Bonačić claimed that agents of players which were only substitute during his stay at Hajduk because he thought that their quality was not enough good were behind the attack. A few months after this incident he has decided to leave Hajduk and he has told for Croatian press that he will never more return to Hajduk.

In 2006, Bonačić accepted an offer as head-coach of Iranian side Sepahan. He was highly successful with Sepahan winning the Hazfi Cup in 2006 and 2007. Also in 2007, he managed to take Sepahan to the AFC Champions League final but lost to Japanese side Urawa Red Diamonds 3–1 on aggregate. Sepahan became the first Iranian football club to make it to the knockout stage and final since Esteghlal in 1990's.

In January 2008, Bonačić signed an 18-month contract with Al-Nasr in Dubai and was sacked in February 2009.

In December 2010, Bonačić signed a contract with Azadegan League club Gostaresh based in Iran, Tabriz.

He returned to his previous club and was named as new head coach of Sepahan on 22 June 2011. After a 3–0 defeat to Mes Kerman in the Pro League and elimination from Champions League, Bonačić was dismissed by club chairman.

In September 2012, Bonačić took over the helm of NK Zagreb and headed this team until October 2012 when he was replaced by Miroslav Blažević.

On 27 December 2012, Bonačić joined Mes Kerman as head coach for the second time but left the team at the end of the season after leading the club at the sixth place. On 1 July 2013, he was named as the head coach of Zob Ahan, signed a one-year contract with the club. On 16 December 2013, it was announced that Luka will leave Zob Ahan in January 2014 and will be succeeded by Mojtaba Taghavi. On 23 January 2014, Luka returns as manager of Mes Kerman with signing a contract until the end of the season. He led Mes Kerman to the Hazfi Cup final for the first time, however, his side lost the match 1–0 to Tractor Sazi. On 6 April, Mes Kerman relegated to the Azadegan League after a 0–0 draw with Saba Qom. He was given a one-year contract by the club to lead them in Azadegan League and promotion back Mes Kerman to the Iran Pro League at the end of the season. However, he was sacked on 11 November 2014 after poor results. On 21 November 2014, he was named as manager of Qatar Stars League side Al-Shahania.

On 9 October 2019, Bonačić was named the new head coach of Varaždin in the Croatian First Football League.

In June 2020, Bonačić was re-appointed head coach of Iranian club Zob Ahan following the departure of Montenegrin coach Miodrag Radulović.

== Statistics ==
As of 4 March 2021

Team	Nat	From	To	Record				
Team	Nat	From	To	G	W	D	L	Win %
NK Varteks	(Croatia)	June 1995	June 1996	22	11	6	5	50.00
Hajduk Split	(Croatia)	January 1997	December 1998	52	31	10	11	59.62
Foolad	(Iran)	June 2003	June 2004	26	13	8	5	50.00
Esteghlal Ahvaz	(Iran)	June 2004	February 2005	20	8	4	8	40.00
KS Dinamo Tirana	(Albania)	February 2005	February 2006	36	17	10	9	47.22
Hajduk Split	(Croatia)	February 2006	June 2006	12	4	4	4	33.33
Sepahan	(Iran)	June 2006	January 2008	88	52	24	12	59.09
Al Nasr	(United Arab Emirates)	July 2008	July 2009	22	6	8	8	27.27
Mes Kerman	(Iran)	December 2009	May 2010	34	11	9	14	32.35
Gostaresh	(Iran)	June 2010	June 2011	26	14	6	6	53.85
Sepahan	(Iran)	June 2011	October 2011	11	5	2	4	45.45
NK Zagreb	(Croatia)	September 2012	November 2012	7	3	2	2	42.86
Mes Kerman	(Iran)	January 2013	June 2013	16	6	8	2	37.50
Zob Ahan	(Iran)	July 2013	January 2014	22	5	7	10	22.73
Mes Kerman	(Iran)	January 2014	November 2014	15	2	9	4	13.33
Al-Shahania	(Qatar)	November 2014	January 2016	11	5	1	5	45.45
Gostaresh	(Iran)	June 2017	September 2017	8	2	1	5	25.00
Al-Arabi	(Qatar)	November 2017	October 2018	19	9	3	7	47.37
Varaždin	(Croatia)	October 2019	February 2020	11	1	2	8	9.09
Zob Ahan	(Iran)	June 2020	August 2020	9	2	2	5	22.22
Total				420	177	117	126	42.14

== Honours ==
NK Varteks

- Croatian Football Cup: Runner up 1995–96

Hajduk Split

- Croatian First League: Runner up 1996–97, 1997–98

Sepahan

- Hazfi Cup: 2005–06, 2006–07
- AFC Champions League: Runner up 2007

Mes Kerman

- Hazfi Cup: Runner up 2013–14
