= Rasoul Korbekandi =

Iranian footballer

Personal information
- Full name: Mohammad Reza Rasoul Korbekandi
- Date of birth: January 27, 1953 (age 73)
- Place of birth: Isfahan, Iran
- Height: 1.87 m (6 ft 1 1/2 in)
- Position: Goalkeeper

Senior career*
Years	Team	Apps	(Gls)
1965–1980	Zob Ahan	308	(0)

International career
1970–1978	Iran	2	(0)

Managerial career
- 1983–1993: Zob Ahan
- 1996–1998: Sepahan
- 2003–2007: Zob Ahan
- 2007–2008: Shahrdari Bandar Abbas
- 2009: Bargh Shiraz
- 2009–2010: Saba Qom
- 2010: Rah Ahan
- 2012: Zob Ahan
- * Club domestic league appearances and goals

Mohammad Reza Rasoul Korbekandi (Persian: رسول کربکندی, born 27 January 1953) is a retired Iranian football player and now manager.

He was a member of the Iran squad (as reserved goalkeeper) which participated at the 1978 FIFA World Cup.

== Coaching career ==
As of 1 October 2012

Team	From	To	Record							
Team	From	To	G	W	D	L	Win %	GF	GA	+/-
Saba	10 November 2009	15 June 2010	22	10	8	4	45%	30	22	+8
Rah Ahan	16 June 2010	7 September 2010	7	1	1	5	14%	7	16	-9
Zob Ahan	1 June 2012	5 October 2012	11	3	1	7	25%	9	17	–8
Total			40	13	10	17	32%	47	55	-8

== Honours ==
=== As manager ===
Zob Ahan

- Hazfi Cup: 2002–03
- Iran Pro League runner-up: 2004–05
