= List of S.C. Damash seasons =

Between 2008-09 and 2014-15 the Iranian football club S.C. Damash Gilan alternated between the Persian Gulf Pro League (formerly Iran Pro League or IPL) - the highest tier of Iranian football - and the Azadegan League. It was demoted in 2009, promoted in 2011, and again demoted in 2014. The team also competed each year in the Hazfi Cup.

== Seasons ==
Season	League									Hazfi Cup	Leagues Top goalscorer		Manager(s)
Season	Division	P	W	D	L	F	A	Pts	Pos	Hazfi Cup	Name(s)	Goals	Manager(s)
1991-92	D/1	22	4	7	11	13	21	15	11th				
1992-93	D/2	26	9	9	8	28	21	27	8th				
1995-96	D/2	16	3	5	8	17	21	11	7th				
1997-98	D/2	14	5	5	4	12	14	20	5th				
1998-99	D/2	16	9	2	5	27	21	31	2nd				
1999-00	D/2	10	5	1	4	7	9	16	2nd				
2000-01	D/1	22	7	3	12	23	43	24	10th				
2001-02	IPL	26	3	7	16	18	44	16	13th	1/16 Final			
2002-03	D/1	30	15	8	7	37	22	53	2nd				Sharafi/ Jahanpour
2003-04	IPL	26	8	6	12	27	42	30	9th	1/8 Final	Pejman Noori	8	Jahanpour/ Ješić
2004-05	IPL	30	3	11	16	17	45	20	16th	1/8 Final	Salamibakhsh & Yazdani & Chavoshi	3	Ješić/ Abtahi/ Sharafi/ Krauss
2005-06	Div 1	22	15	3	4	42	12	48	1st		Hadi Norouzi	13	Begović
2006-07	Div 1	21	11	6	4	22	6	39	1st	1/32 Final	Amin Mohtashami	8	Jahanpour
2007-08	IPL	34	9	11	14	26	35	38	15th	Final	Hossein Ebrahimi	5	Jahanpour/ Dražić/ Dastneshan
2008-09	IPL	34	7	12	15	40	55	33	17th	1/32 Final	Chavoshi	15	Zolfagharnasab/ Abdi/ Poklepović
2009-10	D/1	26	14	6	6	38	26	48	2nd	1/8 Final	Ali Amiri	10	Karimi/ Aghajanyan
2010-11	D/1	26	13	9	4	39	24	48	1st	1/8 Final	Chavoshi	13	Pušnik/ Nazemi/ Dinvarzadeh
2011–12	IPL	34	11	11	12	34	38	44	7th	Quarter-Final	Gholami	8	Dinvarzadeh/ Ghasempour/ Tartar
2012-13	IPL	34	11	10	13	36	43	38	11th	Semi-Final	Jahanbakhsh	8	Harandi/ Derakhshan/ Nazemi
2013-14	IPL	30	5	12	13	30	40	26	17th	1/8 Final	Motevaselzadeh	8	Nazemi/ Nazarmohammadi
2014-15	D/1	21	6	9	6	19	20	27	6th	1/32 Final	Rostami	4	Harandi/ Rabifar
2015-16	D/1	38	8	13	17	29	43	37	19th	1/64 Final			
2016-17	D/2	10	2	2	4	7	13	10	5th	Withdraw			
2017-18	D/2	10	3	6	1	10	8	15	3rd	1/8 Final	Milad Poursafshekan	7	Rezaei/Hajipour
2018-19	D/2	24	14	5	5	34	14	47	2nd	Final	Ali Allkasir	12	Siamak Farahani
2019-20	D/1	34							12th		Mohammad Gholami	6	

=== Key ===
- P = Played
- W = Games won
- D = Games drawn
- L = Games lost
- F = Goals for
- A = Goals against
- Pts = Points
- Pos = Final position
- IPL = Iran Pro League
- D/1 = Azadegan League

Champions	Runners-up	Promoted	Relegated
