= Afshin Nazemi =

Iranian footballer and coach

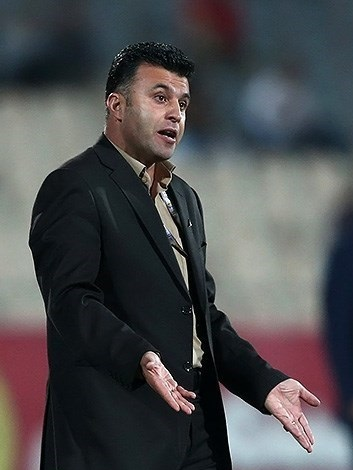

Personal information
- Full name: Afshin Nazemi
- Date of birth: February 20, 1971 (age 55)
- Place of birth: Sowme'eh Sara, Iran
- Position: Midfielder

Team information
- Current team: Gilanmehr Fouman (manager)

Youth career
- 1990–1992: Esteghlal Rasht

Senior career*
Years	Team	Apps	(Gls)
1992–2002	Esteghlal Rasht		
2002–2006	Pegah		

Managerial career
- 2008–2013: Damash Gilan (assistant)
- 2010: Damash Gilan (caretaker)
- 2013–2014: Damash Gilan
- 2014–2015: Sepidrood
- 2018–: Gilanmehr Fouman
- * Club domestic league appearances and goals

Afshin Nazemi (Persian: افشین ناظمی; born 20 February 1971 in Sowme'eh Sara, Iran) is an Iranian football coach and the retired player who is currently manager of Gilanmehr Fouman.

== Playing career ==
He began his career as a football player in 1990 with Esteghlal Rasht. After two years, he joined the first team squad and played for the team for ten years, then moved to Pegah and played three years for the team. He retired in July 2006.

== Managerial career ==
He became assistant manager of Damash Gilan, a new club that was established after the dissolution of Pegah. The first head coach who Nazemi worked with was Bijan Zolfagharnasab, then he worked with Hossein Abdi, Stanko Poklepović, Firouz Karimi, Markar Aghajanian and Marijan Pušnik. After Pušnik was sacked in July 2010, Nazemi was appointed as the caretaker head coach of the club. After Mehdi Dinvarzadeh was signed as the new head coach, he returned to his assistant role and worked with him. Then Ebrahim Ghasempour, Mehdi Tartar, Omid Harandi and Hamid Derakhshan. When Derakhshan was sacked by the club, Nazemi was appointed as caretaker manager of the club to lead the team until the end of the season. After his good results, he was confirmed by club chairman, Amir Abedini to lead the team in 2013–14 season. However, Nazemi was sacked as Damash's manager on 26 January 2014 after six consecutive defeats.

=== Managerial Statistics ===
As of 26 January 2014

Team	From	To	Record				
Team	From	To	G	W	D	L	Win %
Damash	November 2010	December 2010	5	2	2	1	40.00
Damash	March 2013	January 2014	33	10	9	14	30.30
Total			38	12	11	15	31.58
