= S.C. Damash Gilan =

Iranian football club

Damash Gilan داماش گیلان
- Full name: Sport Club Damash Gilan
- Nicknames: Tifosis; Stormy clouds Wearing azure Rain city's Damash; Azure phoenixes
- Founded: 1960; 66 years ago as Taj Rasht Football Club
- Ground: Shahid Dr. Azodi; Sardar Jangal
- Capacity: 15,000; 25,000
- Owner: Naser Zahmatkesh
- Chairman: Jahangir Asgari
- Head Coach: Vacant
- League: League Two
- 2025–26: Azadegan League, 18th
- Website: Official website
Home colours	Away colours	Third colours

Sport Club Damash Gilan (alternatively Damash Guilan, Persian: باشگاه ورزشی داماش گیلان, Bashgah-e Vârzeshi-ye Damash Guilân) is an Iranian football club based in Rasht, Gilan, that competes in the League Two. The club was founded in 1960 as Taj Rasht Football Club (Persian: باشگاه فوتبال تاج رشت).

The football team plays its home games at the Sardar Jangal Stadium which has a seating capacity of 15,000. The club is also using the Shahid Dr. Azodi Stadium apacity of 15,000. The club is owned and supported by Peymam Baharvand.

== History ==
=== Establishment ===
The club was founded as Taj Rasht Football Club in 1960. The club was one of Taj Tehran branches at the time. From the beginning, Taj Rasht was able to attract some of the best players of Gilan province.

=== Before 1970 ===
Before the 1970s, Iran did not have an official national football league. Most clubs participated in championships of their city or province. In addition to that Taj Rasht played in the Gilan Province League until 1970.

=== 1970s ===
In 1970, the Local League was created. The league included teams from all Iran in different qualifying tournaments. Taj Rasht finished fourth in Group A of their qualifying tournament. The club also participated in the 1971–72 Local League season. Taj Rasht missed again qualification for the final stage after they achieved the last place in their group again.

In 1972, the Takht Jamshid Cup was founded as the national league and included teams from all over the country. However, Taj Rasht could not qualify and therefore played again in the Gilan Province League.

=== Abouzar Rasht ===
In 1975 the club changed its name for the first time. Until 1983 the club was called Abouzar Rasht Football Club. Due to the Iranian Revolution and the Iran–Iraq War, the Takht Jamshid Cup was dissolved and also the lower leagues were unorganized. As a result, the club took part in regional championships and cups only irregularly.

=== Esteghlal Rasht ===
In 1983 Abouzar changed its name into Esteghlal Rasht Football Club. Esteghlal means independence in Persian. In 1991 the Azadegan League was formed as the top flight of Iranian football. Esteghlal Rasht took part in the league in the 1991–92 season, but was relegated at the end of the season.

Due to sponsorship, the club was known as Esteghlal Gaz Rasht Football Club in 1992–93 Iran Football's 2nd Division. After playing many years in Iran Football's 2nd Division, they were promoted to Azadegan League in 2000. They finished 10th in 2000–01 season.

In the summer of 2001, the Iran Pro League was established as the professional football league of Iran, Azadegan League was declared as the second-highest professional league in the Iranian football league system. All clubs from the 2000–01 Azadegan League season took participate in the 2001–02 Iran Pro League. Esteghlal Rasht was relegated after an embarrassingly lost 9–2 to Aboomoslem on the last matchday of the season. They finished 13th in that season.

=== Pegah Gilan ===
Due to financial problems and relegation, the Pegah Dairy Company took over the club in the summer of 2002. The club was renamed as Pegah Gilan Football Club. In 2007, however, a club called Esteghlal Shahrdari Rasht was founded again, which could participate as a separate club in the Gilan Provincial League.

Pegah managed to get promoted to the first division and finished 9th in the 2003–04 season. A year later, relegation took place again. Then the club played two years in the Azadegan League. In 2007 they were able to return to the Iran Pro League, known as the Persian Gulf Cup since 2006. With 15th place in the 2007–08 season, Pegah was able to prevent relegation. Pegah also qualified for the Final of the Hazfi Cup this season. After Pegah won the first leg 1–0, they lost in the second leg against Esteghlal in front of almost 100,000 spectators at the Azadi Stadium with 0–3.

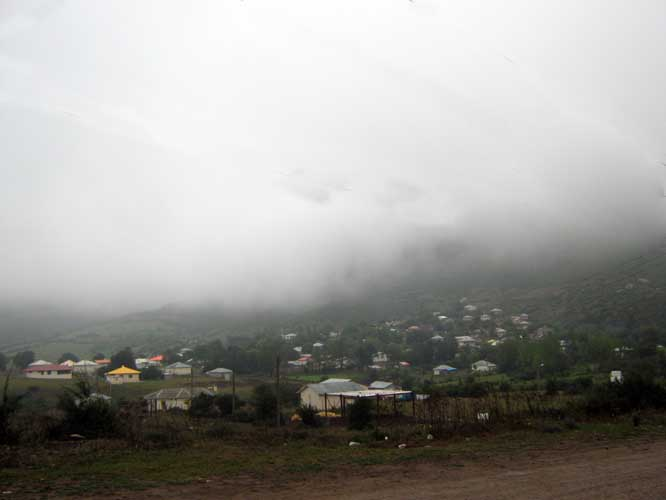
Damash Village, Jirandeh, Gilan

=== Damash Gilan ===
In the summer of 2008, Pegah Gilan was struggling with financial problems. In October of the same year, the Aria Investment Development Company, then owned by Mahafarid Amir Khosravi, took over the club. The club was renamed Sport Club Damash Gilan. Damash is a small historical village in Jirandeh near Rasht.

=== Pro and Azadegan League ===
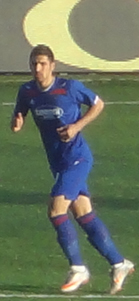
Jahanbaksh played for Damash

The club shuttled between the first two leagues for the following years. In the 2008–09 season, they finished 17th and had to relegate to the Azadegan League. In the 2009–10 season, Damash failed to Sanat Naft Abadan in the play-offs and missed promotion. A year later, the club won the title for it and managed to rise. Between 2011 and 2013, the club played two decent years in the Persian Gulf Cup and came in 7th in 2011–12 and 11th in 2012–13. During this time, Alireza Jahanbakhsh also made a name for himself with good performances, 10 goals in 44 matches. In the summer of 2013, he moved to the Dutch Eredivisie to NEC Nijmegen. Iranian football legend Mehdi Mahdavikia also played for Damash between 2011 and 2012.

Starting in 2013, the club experienced difficult years and relegated at the end of the 2013–14 season. Then followed two disappointing years in the Azadegan League. In the 2014–15 Azadegan League season, the club only finished 6th and missed promotion. In the 2015–16 season, Damash even had to relegate to the League 2.

=== 2016-2026 ===
Due to very great financial difficulties, the club was close to being dissolved in March 2016. The Gilan Football Organization, therefore, took over the rights to the club and so Damash could end the season. After relegation, the club should be renamed Shahr-e Baran Football Club, which led to major protests from fans. Damash then kept his name.

In 2019 Damash sensationally reached the Hazfi Cup Final against Persepolis in the Foolad Arena in Ahvaz. The game turned into a scandal as the stadium was filled with over 30,000 Perespolis supporters hours before kick-off. As a result, the approximately 1,000 Damash fans could not enter the stadium and the kick-off was delayed by a few hours. In the end, Damash lost to Persepolis 0–1.

After three years in the League 2, Damash returned to the Azadegan League. The club replaced Karoon Arvand Khorramshahr for the 2019–20 season.

=== 2026 ===
Damash got relegated to League Two after finishing at 18th place in the 2025-06 Season.

== Name history ==
- Taj Rasht Football Club (1960–1975)
- Abouzar Rasht Football Club (1975–1983)
- Esteghlal Rasht Football Club (1983–1992)
- Esteghlal Gaz Rasht Football Club (1992–1993)
- Esteghlal Rasht Football Club (1993–2002)
- Pegah Gilan Football Club (2002–2008)
- Sport Club Damash Gilan (2008–present)

== Crest ==
The name Damash goes back to a historical village in Jirandeh near Rasht. In 2016, Damash adopted the Lilium ledebourii, a typical plant from this region, in its logo.

Damash Gilan logo history

== Stadium ==
Traditionally, Damash Gilan plays its home games at the Shahid Dr. Azodi Stadium which has a seating capacity of 11,000. The stadium was opened in 1990 and is owned by the club. The stadium was renovated from 2009 to 2011. It is also the traditional home venue of the local rival Sepidrood.

Furthermore, Damash plays some of its home games at the Sardar Jangal Stadium which has a seating capacity of 15,000. The stadium was opened in 2007 and is owned by Sepidrood.

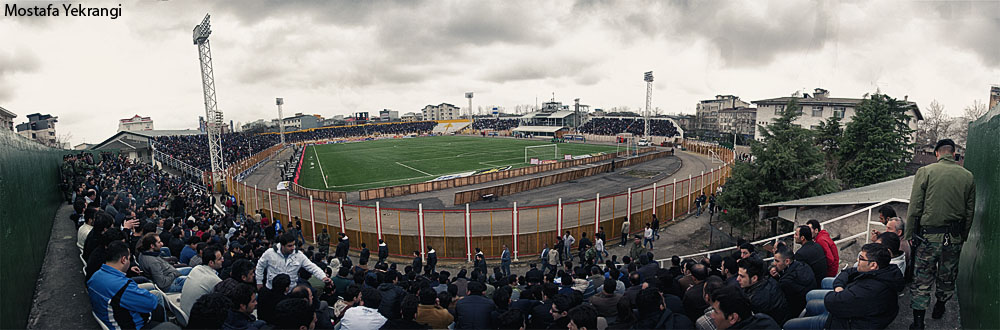
Shahid Dr. Azodi Stadium during a home game of Damash Gilan

== Rivalries ==
=== El Guilano ===
Matches between Malavan of Bandar-e Anzali and the two teams from Rasht, Damash Gilan, and Sepidrood Rasht are known as El Guilano.

=== Further rivalries ===
Within Rasht, Damash has a minor rivalry with PAS Guilan. Damash then has a bigger rivalry with Nassaji Mazandaran from Qaem Shahr.

== Seasons ==
The table below chronicles the achievements of Damash Gilan in various competitions since 1970.

Season	Division	League	Position	Hazfi Cup	Notes
1970–71	1	Local League	4th (Region C)	Not held
1971–72	1	Local League	3rd (Region A)	Not held
1991–92	1	League 1	11th		Relegated
1992–93	2	League 2	8th
1995–96	2	League 2	7th (Group A)
1996–97	2	League 2
1997–98	2	League 2	5th (2nd Round)
1998–99	2	League 2	2nd (Group 1)
1999–00	2	League 2	2nd (2nd Round)		Promoted
2000–01	1	League 1	10th
2001–02	1	IPL	13th	Round of 16	Relegated
2002–03	2	League 1	2nd		Promoted
2003–04	1	IPL	9th	Quarter-Final
2004–05	1	IPL	16th	Quarter-Final	Relegated
2005–06	2	League 1	1st (Group A)
2006–07	2	League 1	1st (Group A)	Round of 32	Promoted
2007–08	1	PGC	15th	Final
2008–09	1	PGC	17th	Round of 32	Relegated
2009–10	2	League 1	2nd (Group B)	Quarter-Final
2010–11	2	League 1	1st (Group A)	Quarter-Final	Promoted
2011–12	1	PGC	7th	Quarter-Final
2012–13	1	PGC	11th	Semi-Final
2013–14	1	PGC	15th	Quarter-Final	Relegated
2014–15	2	League 1	6th (Group B)	Round of 32
2015–16	2	League 1	19th	Round of 64	Relegated
2016–17	3	League 2	5th (2nd Round)	did not enter
2017–18	3	League 2	3rd (2nd Round)	Quarter-Final
2018–19	3	League 2	2nd (Group A)	Final	Promoted
2019–20	2	League 1	12th	Round of 32
2020–21	–	No Participation
2021–22	4	League 3	3rd	did not enter	Promoted
2022–23	3	League 2	3rd	did not enter	Promoted
2023–24	2	League 1	14th	did not enter

Notes:
The Persian Gulf Pro League was formerly known as Iran Pro League (IPL) and Persian Gulf Cup (PGC)
The Azadegan League was the highest division between 1991 and 2001
The League 2 was formerly known as Iran 2nd Division
The League 3 was formerly known as Iran 3rd Division

== Honours ==
=== Domestic ===
- Azadegan League
  - Champions (1): 2010–11
- Hazfi Cup
  - Runners-up (2): 2007–08, 2018–19
- Rasht League
  - Champions (1): 1973

== First-team squad ==
Note: Flags indicate national team as defined under FIFA eligibility rules; some limited exceptions apply. Players may hold more than one non-FIFA nationality.

No.	Pos.	Nation	Player
1	GK	IRI	Saeid Ebrahimpour
2	DF	IRI	Keykhosro Siahpour
3	DF	IRI	Mohammad Amini
4	DF	IRI	Kan'aan Tahernejad
5	DF	IRI	Seyed Alireza Ebrahimi (captain)
6	MF	IRI	Nima Mokhtari
7	FW	IRI	Fardin Najafi
8	MF	IRI	Mohammad Sharifi
9	FW	IRI	Mehrdad Bayrami
10	FW	IRI	Mohammad Mehdi Mehdikhani
11	FW	IRI	Sajjad Gholibeigi
13	DF	IRI	Hossein Haghshenas
14	FW	IRI	Erfan Ghorbani
15	DF	IRI	Mehdi Javid
17	MF	IRI	Alireza Khodaei
18	DF	IRI	Milad Roueein

No.	Pos.	Nation	Player
19	DF	IRI	Hadi Rafsanjani
20	MF	IRI	Mohammad Ganjkhanlo
22	GK	IRI	Amirhossein Hajiagha
26	FW	IRI	Saeid Hosseinpour
27	MF	IRI	Reza Shakhes
33	GK	IRI	Amin Haghparast
37	FW	IRI	Sajad Ghasemlo
46	FW	IRI	Saman Mehrabizadeh
55	DF	IRI	Arman Lotfekhoda
66	FW	IRI	Mohammadreza Pirouzmand
69	GK	IRI	Yousef Behzadi
70	FW	IRI	Reza Zahedtabar
77	MF	IRI	Reza Azari
80	GK	IRI	Mani Ataeifar
88	MF	IRI	Farshad Hashemi
99	MF	IRI	Mohsen Enbesati

For recent transfers, see List of Iranian football transfers winter 2018–19.

== Club managers ==
Seasons	Manager	Nationality
Oct 2008–Nov 08	Bijan Zolfagharnasab	(Iran)
Nov 2008–Jan 09	Hossein Abdi	(Iran)
Jan 2009–Apr 09	Stanko Poklepović	(Croatia)
Jul 2009–Jun 10	Firouz Karimi	(Iran)
Jun 2010–Jul 10	Markar Aghajanian	(Iran)
Jul 2010–Nov 10	Marijan Pušnik	(Slovenia)
Nov 2010–Dec 10	Afshin Nazemi	(Iran)
Dec 2010–Sep 11	Mehdi Dinvarzadeh	(Iran)
Sep 2011–Jan 12	Ebrahim Ghasempour	(Iran)
Jan 2012–May 12	Mehdi Tartar	(Iran)
Jun 2012–Sep 12	Omid Harandi	(Iran)
Sep 2012–Mar 13	Hamid Derakhshan	(Iran)
Mar 2013–Jan 14	Afshin Nazemi	(Iran)
Jan 2014–Sep 14	Ali Nazarmohammadi	(Iran)
Sep 2014–Mar 15	Omid Harandi	(Iran)
Aug 2015–Apr 16	Majid Jahanpour	(Iran)

Seasons	Manager	Nationality
Aug 2015–Apr 16	Majid Jahanpour	(Iran)
Apr 2015–July 16	Afshin Nazemi	(Iran)
Aug 2016–Nov 16	Ramiz Mammadov	(Azerbaijan)
Nov 2016–Jun 17	Hadi Tabatabaei	(Iran)
Jun 2017–18	Vahid Rezaei	(Iran)
Jun 2018–Sep 21	Siamak Farahani	(Iran)
Oct 2021 –Apr 22	Mohammad Mokhtari	(Iran)
Apr 2022–May 22	Esmaeil Zahedvishgahi	(Iran)
Jun 2022–Sep 23	Behzad Dadashzadeh	(Iran)
Sep 2022–Mar 23	Akbar Misaghian	(Iran)
Mar 2023–Jul 23	Farshad Pious	(Iran)
Sep 2023–Oct 23	Siamak Farahani	(Iran)
Oct 2023–Jul 24	Ali Nazarmohammadi	(Iran)
Aug 2024–Oct 23	Hamid Derakhshan	(Iran)
Dec 2024–	Ali Nazarmohammadi	(Iran)

== Records ==
=== Top goalscorers ===
#	Pos.	Name	Career	League	Cup	Total
1	Forward	Afshin Chavoshi	2008–09; 2010–15	40	3	**43**
2	Midfielder	**Reza Mahdavi**	2008–09; 2010–14; 2016–	16	3	**19**
3	Defender	Ali Nazifkar	2008–09; 2010–14	17	1	**18**
4	Midfielder	Ali Amiri	2009–11	12	3	**15**
5	Forward	Amin Motevaselzadeh	2012–14	13	1	**14**

=== Top appearances ===
#	Pos.	Name	Career	League	Cup	Total
1	Midfielder	**Mostafa Hajati**	2008–14; 2015–	152	7	**159**
2	Midfielder	**Reza Mahdavi**	2008–09; 2010–14; 2016–	147	8	**155**
3	Midfielder	**Hadi Sohrabi**	2008–11; 2012–	125	9	**134**
4	Defender	Ali Nazifkar	2008–09; 2010–14	121	7	**128**
5	Forward	Afshin Chavoshi	2008–09; 2010–15	111	6	**117**

Last updated: May 16, 2016.
Bolded players are currently on the Damash squad.

== See also ==
- Damash Tehran
- Gahar Zagros
