= Ali Nazarmohammadi =

Iranian footballer and manager

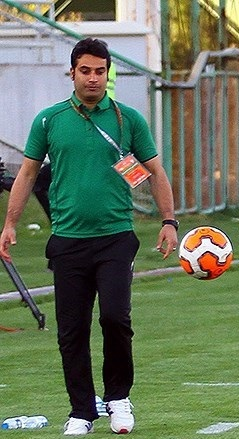
- Ali Nazarmohammadi managing Damash Gilan in 2014

Personal information
- Full name: Ali Nazarmohammadi
- Date of birth: June 24, 1978 (age 48)
- Place of birth: Rasht, Iran
- Position: Goalkeeper

Youth career
- Esteghlal Rasht
- Shahin Rasht

Senior career*
Years	Team	Apps	(Gls)
	Sepidrood	?	(0)
	Malavan	?	(0)
2002–2003	Pegah	?	(0)
2003–2004	Payam Mashhad	?	(0)
2004–2006	Mes Kerman	?	(0)
2006–2008	Pegah	26	(0)
2008–2009	Damash Gilan	28	(0)
2009–2010	Steel Azin	12	(0)
2010–2011	Damash Gilan	13	(0)
2011–2012	Pas Hamedan	14	(0)
2012–2013	Nassaji	20	(0)

Managerial career
- 2013–2014: Damash Gilan (assistant)
- 2014: Damash Gilan
- 2015–2017: Sepidrood
- 2018: Khooneh be Khooneh
- 2019–2020: Rayka
- 2021-: Sepidrood
- * Club domestic league appearances and goals

Ali Nazarmohammadi (Persian: علی‌ نظر محمدی) born, 1981 is a retired Iranian footballer and coach who recently managed Khooneh be Khooneh.

== Career ==
He started his football career in the youth team of Esteghlal Rasht and then moved to Malavan because of army services. After playing a couple of seasons for Malavan he moved to Mes Kerman and helped the team to be promoted to the Iran Pro League. In 2006, he came back to his hometown Rasht and played for Pegah Gilan. In the beginning of the 2008–09 season Pegah was sold to Damash Iranian and named Damash Gilan. He had an unsuccessful season with Damash and the team was relegated to the Azadegan League. After Damash's relegation he moved to the newly founded team Steel Azin along with players Mohammadreza Mahdavi and Afshin Chavoshi.

== Statistics ==
=== Club career statistics ===
Club performance			League		Cup		Continental		Total	
Season	Club	League	Apps	Goals	Apps	Goals	Apps	Goals	Apps	Goals
Iran			League		Hazfi Cup		Asia		Total	
2006–07	Pegah	Division 1	5	0	0	0	–	–	5	0
2007–08	Pegah	Pro League	21	0	5	0	–	–	26	0
2008–09	Damash	Pro League	28	0	0	0	–	–	28	0
2009–10	Steel Azin	Pro League	12	0	0	0	–	–	12	0
2010–11	Damash	Division 1	13	0	1	0	–	–	16	0
2011–12	Pas Hamedan	Division 1	14	0	–	–	–	–	14	0
2012–13	Nassaji	Division 1	20	0	–	–	–	–	20	0
Total	Iran		113	0	6	0	0	0	119	0
Career total			113	0	6	0	0	0	119	0

=== Managerial statistics ===
As of 5 December 2017

Team	From	To	Record							
Team	From	To	G	W	D	L	GF	GA	+/-	Win %
Damash Gilan	17 January 2014	1 September 2014	9	1	4	4	8	9	−1	11.11
Sepidrood	1 July 2015	10 December 2017	72	33	22	17	75	55	+20	45.83
Khooneh be Khooneh	12 October 2018	10 November 2018	6	1	2	3	3	7	−4	16.67

== Honours ==
=== Player ===
Pegah Gilan

- Hazfi Cup Runner-up: 2007–08

Mes Kerman

- Azadegan League: 2005–061

Damash Gilan

- Azadegan League: 2010–11

=== Managerial ===
Sepidrood

- Azadegan League runner-up: 2016–17 (promotion)
