= 2012–13 Persian Gulf Cup =

12nd season of Persian Gulf Pro League

Persian Gulf Cup
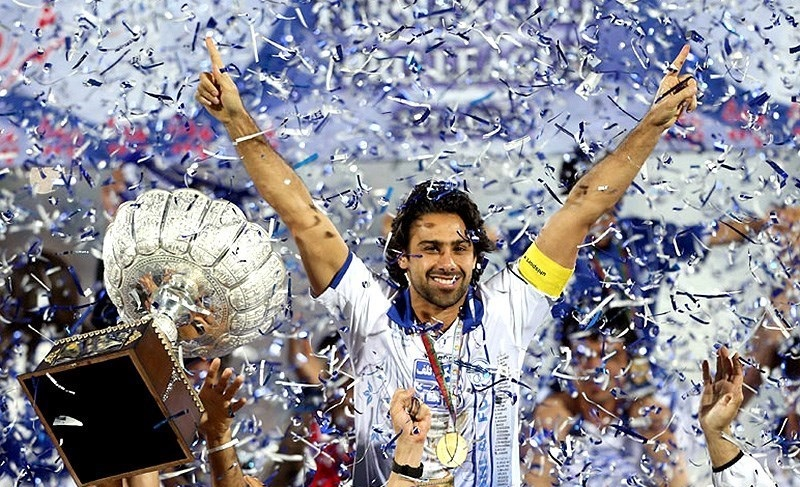
- Esteghlal FC's Iranian idol Farhad Majidi raise the cup at Azadi Stadium
- Season: 2012–13
- Champions: Esteghlal; 3rd Pro League title 8th Iranian title
- Relegated: Aluminium Hormozgan; Sanat Naft; Paykan; Gahar Zagros
- Champions League: Esteghlal; Tractor Sazi; Sepahan; Foolad
- Matches: 306
- Goals: 694 (2.27 per match)
- Top goalscorer: Jalal Rafkhaei (19 goals)
- Best goalkeeper: Mehdi Rahmati (21 clean sheets)
- Biggest home win: Persepolis 6–0 Paykan (31 October 2012); Fajr Sepasi 6–0 Aluminium Hormozgan (2 March 2013); Zob Ahan 6–0 Sanat Naft (5 May 2013)
- Biggest away win: Paykan 0–5 Foolad (26 September 2012); Fajr Sepasi 0–5 Esteghlal (15 February 2013)
- Highest scoring: Damash 5–3 Paykan (31 July 2012); Sanat Naft 2–6 Naft Tehran (6 August 2012)
- Longest winning run: 5 matches Sepahan
- Longest unbeaten run: 19 matches Foolad
- Longest winless run: 21 matches Sanat Naft
- Longest losing run: 7 matches Paykan; Gahar Zagros
- Highest attendance: 100,000; Esteghlal – Persepolis (25 January 2013); Esteghlal – Damash (10 May 2013)
- Lowest attendance: 0 (spectator ban); Persepolis – Fajr Sepasi (24 July 2012); Persepolis – Aluminium Hormozgan (27 September 2012); Damash – Zob Ahan (1 October 2012); Damash – Saba Qom (23 February 2013); Esteghlal – Gahar Zagros (12 April 2013)
- Total attendance: 2,397,100
- Average attendance: 7,964

The 2012–13 Persian Gulf Cup (also known as Iran Pro League) was the 30th season of Iran's Football League and 12th as Iran Pro League since its establishment in 2001. Sepahan were the defending champions. The season featured 15 teams from the 2011–12 Persian Gulf Cup and three new teams promoted from the 2011–12 Azadegan League: Paykan as champions, Aluminium Hormozgan and Gahar Zagros. The league started on 19 July 2012 and ended on 10 May 2013. Esteghlal won the Pro League title for the third time in their history (total eighth Iranian title).

== Events ==
=== Competition format ===
After the 2012–13 Iran Pro League season, it was planned that the number of teams would be reduced from 18 to 16 for the next season, so 4 team was directly relegated to the Azadegan League, while one team was played against the 3rd ranked team from the second division league team in a play-off. 2 teams also are directly promoted from current Azadegan league to the next pro league season and one team played against the 14th placed pro league team in a play-off.

=== Rules and regulations ===
The Iranian Football Clubs who participate in 2012–13 Iran Pro League are allowed to have up to maximum 35 players (including up to maximum 4 non-Iranian players) in their player lists, which will be categorized in the following groups:

- Up to maximum 21 adult (over 23-year-old) players
- Up to maximum 6 under-23 players (i.e. the player whose birth is after 19 July 1989).
- Up to maximum 5 under-21 players (i.e. the player whose birth is after 19 July 1991).
- Up to maximum 3 under-19 players (i.e. the player whose birth is after 19 July 1993).

Based on the fact that the Season is started from 19 July 2012.

== Teams ==
=== Stadia and locations ===
Locations of clubs in 2012–13 Persian Gulf Cup

Team	City	Venue	Capacity
Aluminium	Bandar Abbas	Khalij Fars	15,459
Damash Gilan	Rasht	Dr. Azodi	11,000
Esteghlal	Tehran	Azadi	84,412
Fajr Sepasi	Shiraz	Hafezieh; Dastgheib	14,560; 7,000
Foolad	Ahvaz	Ghadir	50,199
Gahar Zagros	Dorood	Takhti Doorood	10,052
Malavan	Anzali	Takhti Anzali	8,000
Mes Kerman	Kerman	Shahid Bahonar	15,430
Naft Tehran	Tehran	Dastgerdi	8,250
Paykan	Tehran	Peykanshahr	30,000
Persepolis	Tehran	Azadi	84,412
Rah Ahan	Tehran	Rah Ahan	12,922
Saba Qom	Qom	Yadegar Emam	10,610
Saipa	Karaj	Enghelab Karaj	30,000
Sanat Naft	Abadan	Takhti Abadan	25,256
Sepahan	Esfahan	Foolad Shahr	31,439
Tractor Sazi	Tabriz	Yadegar-e-Emam	66,833
Zob Ahan	Esfahan	Foolad Shahr	31,439

=== Personnel and kits ===
Note: Flags indicate national team as has been defined under FIFA eligibility rules. Players may hold more than one non-FIFA nationality.

Team	Manager	Captain	Kit manufacturer	Shirt sponsor	Past Season
Aluminium	(Iran) Parviz Mazloomi	(Iran) Mahmood Tighnavard	Uhlsport	Parmis	Promoted
Damash	(Iran) Afshin Nazemi (caretaker)	(Iran) Reza Mahdavi	Uhlsport	Sadra Holding	7th
Esteghlal	(Iran) Amir Ghalenoei	(Iran) Farhad Majidi	Uhlsport	Refah Bank	Champion
Fajr Sepasi	(Iran) Mahmoud Yavari	(Iran) Hossein Kazemi	Majid	HICE	13th
Foolad	(Iran) Hossein Faraki	(Iran) Bakhtiar Rahmani	Uhlsport	Foolad Khuzestan	14th
Gahar Zagros	(Iran) Mohammad Mayeli Kohan	(Iran) Majid Bajelan	Uhlsport	Mahab	Promoted
Malavan	(Iran) Mohammad Ahmadzadeh	(Iran) Pejman Nouri	Uhlsport	Steel Azin Iranian	12th
Mes Kerman	(Croatia) Luka Bonačić	(Iran) Farzad Hosseinkhani	Uhlsport	Resalat Bank	9th
Naft Tehran	(Iran) Mansour Ebrahimzadeh	(Iran) Hadi Shakouri	Uhlsport	NIOC	5th
Paykan	(Iran) Firouz Karimi	(Iran) Reza Tahmasebi	Uhlsport	IKCO Runna	Promoted
Persepolis	(Iran) Yahya Golmohammadi	(Iran) Mehdi Mahdavikia	Uhlsport	Kavosh	15th
Rah Ahan	(Iran) Ali Daei	(Iran) Hossein Pashaei	Daei	Fars Air Qeshm	11th
Saba Qom	(Iran) Samad Marfavi	(Iran) Morteza Kashi	Majid	Lojix	4th
Saipa	(Iran) Mojtaba Taghavi	(Iran) Ebrahim Sadeghi	Uhlsport	SAIPA	8th
Sanat Naft	(Portugal) Acácio Casimiro	(Iran) Hossein Kaebi	adidas	Jondi Shapour Co.	10th
Sepahan	(Croatia) Zlatko Kranjčar	(Iran) Moharram Navidkia	Lotto	Foolad Mobarakeh	3rd
Tractor Sazi	(Iran) Hassan Azarnia (interim)	(Iran) Morteza Assadi	Uhlsport	Javanan Khayyer	2nd
Zob Ahan	(Iran) Farhad Kazemi	(Iran) Mohammad Salsali	Uhlsport	Esfahan Steel	6th

Notes

1. Esteghlal's captain was Mehdi Rahmati before Farhad Majidi rejoins to the team.
2. Reza Haghighi was the captain of Fajr Sepasi until his transfer to the Persepolis.
3. From 19 January 2013 to 18 March 2013, Ali Firouzi and from 18 March 2013, Saeed Salamaat were the caretaker head coaches of Sanat Naft due to Casimiro's illness.

== Managerial changes ==
=== Before the start of the season ===
Team	Outgoing head coach	Manner of departure	Date of vacancy	Position in table	Incoming head coach	Date of appointment
Paykan	(Iran) Farhad Kazemi	Contract expired	9 May 2012	Pre-season	(Iran) Abdollah Veisi	1 June 2012
Damash	(Iran) Mehdi Tartar	End of caretaker spell	31 May 2012	Pre-season	(Iran) Omid Harandi	1 June 2012
Foolad	(Iran) Majid Jalali	Contract expired	31 May 2012	Pre-season	(Iran) Hossein Faraki	1 June 2012
Zob Ahan	(Iran) Mansour Ebrahimzadeh	Contract expired	31 May 2012	Pre-season	(Iran) Rasoul Korbekandi	1 June 2012
Saba	(Iran) Abdollah Veisi	Contract expired	31 May 2012	Pre-season	(Iran) Yahya Golmohammadi	1 June 2012
Naft Tehran	(Iran) Hossein Faraki	Signed by Foolad	31 May 2012	Pre-season	(Iran) Mansour Ebrahimzadeh	1 June 2012
Esteghlal	(Iran) Parviz Mazloomi	Sacked	31 May 2012	Pre-season	(Iran) Amir Ghalenoei	1 June 2012
Tractor Sazi	(Iran) Amir Ghalenoei	Signed by Esteghlal	31 May 2012	Pre-season	(Portugal) Toni	9 June 2012
Gahar Zagros	(Iran) Davoud Mahabadi	Resigned	19 June 2012	Pre-season	(Iran) Mehdi Tartar	24 June 2012
Persepolis	(Turkey) Mustafa Denizli	Mutual agreement	22 June 2012	Pre-season	(Portugal) Manuel José de Jesus	3 July 2012

=== In season ===
Team	Outgoing head coach	Manner of departure	Date of vacancy	Position in table	Incoming head coach	Date of appointment
Gahar Zagros	(Iran) Mehdi Tartar	Resigned	14 September 2012	17th	(Iran) Mohammad Mayeli Kohan	27 October 2012
Damash	(Iran) Omid Harandi	Sacked	16 September 2012	11th	(Iran) Hamid Derakhshan	18 September 2012
Saba	(Iran) Yahya Golmohammadi	Resigned	24 September 2012	7th	(Iran) Samad Marfavi	25 September 2012
Sanat Naft	(Portugal) José Alberto Costa	Sacked	27 September 2012	17th	(Portugal) Acácio Casimiro	7 October 2012
Malavan	(Iran) Farhad Pourgholami	Resigned	29 September 2012	9th	(Iran) Mohammad Ahmadzadeh	29 September 2012
Zob Ahan	(Iran) Rasoul Korbekandi	Sacked	5 October 2012	15th	(Iran) Farhad Kazemi	8 October 2012
Persepolis	(Portugal) Manuel José de Jesus	Sacked	10 December 2012	12th	(Iran) Yahya Golmohammadi	10 December 2012
Mes Kerman	(Iran) Ebrahim Ghasempour	Sacked	1 January 2013	8th	(Croatia) Luka Bonačić	1 January 2013
Paykan	(Iran) Abdollah Veisi	Sacked	27 January 2013	16th	(Iran) Firouz Karimi	27 January 2013
Aluminium	(Iran) Akbar Misaghian	Sacked	12 February 2013	14th	(Iran) Parviz Mazloomi	12 February 2013
Damash	(Iran) Hamid Derakhshan	Sacked	3 March 2013	13th	(Iran) Afshin Nazemi	7 March 2013
Tractor Sazi	(Portugal) Toni	Sacked	2 May 2013	2nd	(Iran) Majid Jalali	1 June 2013

== Foreign players ==
Club	Player 1	Player 2	Player 3	Asian Player	Former Players
Aluminium	(Bosnia and Herzegovina) Riad Demic	(Brazil) Luiz Fernando	(Libya) Éamon Zayed	(Syria) Mohamed Istanbali	(Brazil) Cris (Brazil) Henrique
Damash Gilan	(Brazil) Arilson	(Burkina Faso) Boubacar Kébé			(Morocco) Ibrahim Maaroufi
Esteghlal	(Bolivia) Vicente Arze	(Trinidad and Tobago) Jlloyd Samuel			(Brazil) Januário (Brazil) Rodrigo Tosi (Australia) Liam Reddy
Fajr Sepasi	(Curaçao) Sendley Bito				(Brazil) Diego Máximo (Syria) Mahmoud Amnah
Foolad	(Brazil) Chimba	(Brazil) Juninho	(Brazil) Leandro Padovani		(Romania) Claudiu Mircea Ionescu
Gahar Zagros	(Armenia) Hamlet Mkhitaryan	(Bosnia and Herzegovina) Saša Kolunija			(Armenia) Grigor Meliksetyan
Malavan	(Moldova) Serghei Pașcenco				
Mes Kerman	(Montenegro) Milan Mijatović	(Serbia) Ivan Petrović	(Serbia) Stevan Bates		
Naft Tehran	(Brazil) Magno	(Brazil) Mario Ramos	(Croatia) Goran Ljubojević		
Paykan	(Brazil) Diego Máximo	(Brazil) Fábio Carvalho	(Brazil) Josieley Ferreira		
Persepolis	(Brazil) Nilson	(North Macedonia) Vlatko Grozdanoski	(Serbia) Marko Perović		(Brazil) Roberto Sousa (Libya) Éamon Zayed (South Korea) Kwon Jun
Rah Ahan	(Brazil) Igor Castro				
Saba Qom	(Cameroon) David Wirikom				
Saipa	(Brazil) Júnior	(Brazil) Márcio Alemão			
Sanat Naft	(Armenia) Valeri Aleksanyan	(Mali) Fousseyni Sidibé	(Portugal) Hugo Machado		(Brazil) Diogo Melo (Croatia) Marko Šimić
Sepahan	(Albania) Ervin Bulku	(Albania) Xhevahir Sukaj		(Australia) Milan Susak	(Montenegro) Radomir Đalović
Tractor Sazi	(Netherlands) Agil Etemadi	(Portugal) Flávio Paixão			(Portugal) João Vilela
Zob Ahan	(Armenia) Gevorg Kasparov	(Ivory Coast) Ismaël Béko Fofana			(Montenegro) Darko Božović (North Macedonia) Aco Stojkov (Portugal) Hugo Machado

== League table ==
Pos	Team	Pld	W	D	L	GF	GA	GD	Pts	Qualification or relegation
1	Esteghlal (C)	34	19	10	5	42	18	+24	67	Qualification for the 2014 AFC Champions League group stage
2	Tractor Sazi	34	18	11	5	55	32	+23	65	Qualification for the 2014 AFC Champions League group stage
3	Sepahan	34	19	7	8	64	33	+31	64	Qualification for the 2014 AFC Champions League group stage
4	Foolad	34	14	14	6	52	35	+17	56	Qualification for the 2014 AFC Champions League group stage
5	Naft Tehran	34	14	13	7	42	29	+13	55	
6	Mes Kerman	34	12	15	7	33	26	+7	51	
7	Persepolis	34	12	14	8	41	31	+10	50	
8	Rah Ahan	34	12	12	10	49	39	+10	48	
9	Saba Qom	34	10	15	9	37	33	+4	45	
10	Saipa	34	11	12	11	37	33	+4	45	
11	Damash	34	11	10	13	36	47	−11	43	
12	Fajr Sepasi	34	10	12	12	42	38	+4	42	
13	Malavan	34	9	13	12	34	39	−5	40	
14	Zob Ahan (O)	34	9	11	14	36	40	−4	38	Qualification to relegation play-offs
15	Aluminium Hormozgan (R)	34	7	14	13	26	42	−16	35	Relegation to 2013–14 Azadegan League
16	Sanat Naft (R)	34	4	13	17	31	63	−32	25	Relegation to 2013–14 Azadegan League
17	Paykan (R)	34	6	7	21	26	70	−44	25	Relegation to 2013–14 Azadegan League
18	Gahar Zagros (R)	34	3	10	21	24	59	−35	19	Relegation to 2013–14 Azadegan League

Updated to match(es) played on 10 May 2013. Source: IPL stats.com
Rules for classification: 1) points; 2) goal difference; 3) number of goals scored.
(C) Champions; (O) Play-off winners; (R) Relegated

== Results ==
Home \ Away	ALH	DMG	EST	FJR	FOL	GZA	MLV	NAF	PAY	PRS	RAH	SAB	SAP	MES	SNA	SEP	TRK	ZOB
Aluminium Hormozgan		0–0	0–2	3–3	1–1	1–0	3–2	0–0	0–1	0–0	1–1	0–1	1–0	1–0	1–1	1–1	1–2	0–0
Damash	1–2		1–0	1–0	1–1	1–0	0–0	2–0	5–3	1–0	0–1	1–1	1–1	0–1	3–1	2–1	1–2	0–0
Esteghlal	1–0	1–2		0–0	2–3	2–0	1–1	2–1	2–0	0–0	1–0	1–0	1–0	2–1	2–1	1–1	1–0	1–0
Fajr Sepasi	6–0	6–1	0–5		1–1	0–0	2–1	0–0	0–0	0–2	2–2	1–1	1–0	1–1	2–0	0–0	1–0	3–0
Foolad	2–1	2–2	0–1	2–1		4–1	1–0	3–1	3–1	1–1	2–1	2–2	2–0	0–1	3–0	1–3	3–2	2–1
Gahar Zagros	0–1	1–2	0–2	0–3	1–1		0–1	0–0	2–0	1–1	2–1	1–1	0–3	0–1	2–2	1–4	1–2	1–0
Malavan	1–0	3–1	0–0	1–0	2–2	1–1		1–3	0–0	2–2	0–0	0–1	1–0	1–1	2–2	0–2	1–1	0–1
Naft Tehran	0–0	2–0	1–1	2–1	0–0	0–0	2–0		1–2	1–1	1–1	1–0	0–0	0–0	4–1	3–4	1–1	1–0
Paykan	2–1	0–2	0–3	1–2	0–5	3–2	1–0	1–3		1–2	2–4	1–4	1–2	0–0	0–0	1–0	1–1	2–2
Persepolis	1–0	1–0	0–0	2–3	0–0	3–2	1–0	0–0	6–0		2–0	0–2	4–1	2–2	2–2	1–0	0–1	3–2
Rah Ahan	3–0	1–0	0–2	1–0	2–1	3–1	0–1	0–1	1–0	1–0		1–1	0–0	1–1	2–1	0–1	0–1	1–1
Saba Qom	2–1	3–3	1–1	1–1	0–0	1–0	1–3	1–2	4–0	0–0	0–1		2–1	0–1	3–2	1–1	0–0	0–0
Saipa	1–0	2–0	2–1	3–0	1–1	2–2	2–2	0–1	2–1	0–0	0–1	2–0		0–0	1–0	0–3	2–2	0–0
Mes Kerman	0–0	1–0	0–0	1–0	0–0	5–1	1–2	0–1	0–0	2–1	4–0	0–0	2–2		1–0	1–0	1–3	1–0
Sanat Naft	2–2	0–0	1–2	1–1	1–0	0–0	1–1	2–6	2–0	0–1	1–0	2–1	0–3	0–0		1–1	0–1	1–1
Sepahan	2–2	3–0	0–1	1–0	0–1	2–1	3–1	3–1	2–0	2–0	2–2	2–0	0–2	1–0	3–0		1–4	4–3
Tractor Sazi	1–1	2–2	2–0	3–1	1–1	5–0	1–0	2–1	1–0	3–1	3–0	0–0	0–0	2–1	3–2	1–3		1–1
Zob Ahan	0–1	1–0	0–0	1–0	2–1	1–0	2–3	0–1	2–1	1–1	0–0	1–2	3–2	1–2	6–0	0–4	3–1	

Updated to match(es) played on 10 May 2013. Source: IPL Stats
Legend: Blue = home team win; Yellow = draw; Red = away team win.

== Positions by round ==
Team ╲ Round	1	2	3	4	5	6	7	8	9	10	11	12	13	14	15	16	17	18	19	20	21	22	23	24	25	26	27	28	29	30	31	32	33	34
Esteghlal	4	9	5	8	9	10	10	9	8	6	4	5	2	1	1	1	2	1	1	1	1	1	1	1	1	1	1	1	1	1	1	1	1	1
Tractor Sazi	12	10	8	6	2	5	6	7	4	5	7	4	1	3	4	6	6	5	3	2	2	2	2	2	3	2	2	2	3	3	3	3	3	2
Sepahan	6	3	2	1	3	7	2	3	2	1	1	1	5	4	2	2	1	2	4	4	4	4	4	4	2	3	3	3	2	2	2	2	2	3
Foolad	8	14	11	11	12	13	14	15	12	11	9	9	8	8	7	3	3	3	2	3	3	3	3	3	4	4	4	4	4	4	4	4	4	4
Naft Tehran	9	6	9	5	7	2	1	1	1	2	2	2	4	6	9	10	10	9	9	10	6	5	5	5	5	5	5	5	5	5	5	5	5	5
Mes Kerman	15	16	17	15	14	12	13	12	11	12	12	14	11	12	12	9	9	8	7	8	11	12	9	10	9	7	6	7	7	7	7	7	7	6
Persepolis	3	8	10	12	16	15	16	14	15	13	13	11	14	11	10	11	12	13	10	11	12	9	11	11	6	6	7	6	6	6	6	6	6	7
Rah Ahan	10	4	7	9	11	9	4	10	6	8	6	8	10	10	8	5	5	6	6	6	9	7	8	9	11	9	10	8	8	8	8	9	9	8
Saba Qom	1	1	4	3	5	6	7	4	7	7	10	10	9	9	11	12	13	11	11	7	7	8	6	7	7	10	8	9	10	9	10	8	8	9
Saipa	11	7	12	7	6	1	3	5	3	4	5	7	6	7	5	7	7	7	8	9	8	11	12	12	12	11	11	12	12	10	9	10	10	10
Damash	7	11	6	10	8	11	11	11	13	14	14	15	12	13	13	13	11	12	13	13	13	13	13	13	13	13	13	13	13	13	13	13	13	11
Malavan	5	5	3	2	1	4	5	6	9	9	8	6	3	2	3	4	4	4	5	5	5	6	10	6	8	8	9	10	9	11	11	11	11	13
Fajr Sepasi	2	2	1	4	4	3	8	2	5	3	3	3	7	5	6	8	8	10	12	12	10	10	7	8	10	12	12	11	11	12	12	12	12	12
Zob Ahan	17	18	18	18	18	18	18	18	18	15	15	16	16	16	16	16	16	16	16	16	16	15	15	15	16	16	15	15	15	14	14	15	14	14
Aluminium Hormozgan	13	12	13	14	13	16	12	13	14	16	16	13	15	15	15	15	15	15	14	14	14	14	14	14	14	14	14	14	14	15	15	14	15	15
Sanat Naft	16	13	14	17	17	17	17	17	16	17	18	18	18	17	17	17	17	17	17	17	18	18	18	18	18	18	18	18	17	17	17	17	17	16
Paykan	18	15	16	13	10	8	9	8	10	10	11	12	13	14	14	14	14	14	15	15	15	16	16	16	15	15	16	16	16	16	16	16	16	17
Gahar Zagros	14	17	15	16	15	14	15	16	17	18	17	17	17	18	18	18	18	18	18	18	17	17	17	17	17	17	17	17	18	18	18	18	18	18

Leader
2014 AFC Champions League
Relegation to Qualification
Relegation to 2013–14 Azadegan League

Source: Cups.ir (in Persian)

== Clubs season-progress ==
Team ╲ Round	1	2	3	4	5	6	7	8	9	10	11	12	13	14	15	16	17	18	19	20	21	22	23	24	25	26	27	28	29	30	31	32	33	34
Esteghlal	W	L	W	D	D	D	W	W	D	W	W	L	W	W	W	L	L	W	W	D	W	D	D	W	W	W	W	D	W	D	W	D	W	L
Tractor Sazi	D	D	W	W	W	L	D	D	W	L	D	W	W	D	L	D	W	D	W	W	W	W	D	D	W	W	W	W	L	L	W	D	W	W
Sepahan	W	W	D	W	L	L	W	D	W	W	W	D	L	W	L	W	D	L	L	W	W	W	W	D	W	L	W	W	W	W	W	D	L	D
Foolad	D	L	W	D	L	L	D	L	W	W	W	D	W	D	W	W	W	D	W	D	W	D	W	D	W	D	W	L	W	D	D	D	L	D
Naft Tehran	D	W	D	W	L	W	W	D	W	D	D	D	L	L	L	D	L	W	D	D	W	W	W	W	D	W	D	L	W	D	L	W	W	D
Mes Kerman	L	L	L	D	W	W	L	D	W	D	L	D	W	D	W	W	D	W	D	L	L	D	W	D	D	W	W	D	D	D	W	D	W	W
Persepolis	W	L	D	L	L	D	D	D	L	W	D	W	L	W	W	D	L	D	W	W	D	W	D	D	W	W	D	W	L	D	W	D	W	L
Rah Ahan	D	W	D	L	D	W	W	L	W	D	W	L	L	D	W	W	W	L	L	L	L	W	L	D	L	W	L	W	W	D	D	L	D	D
Saba Qom	W	W	L	W	D	L	D	W	L	D	L	D	W	D	L	L	D	W	D	W	D	D	W	D	D	L	D	D	L	W	D	W	D	L
Saipa	D	W	L	W	W	W	L	D	W	L	D	L	W	L	W	D	D	D	L	D	D	L	L	D	D	W	D	L	D	W	W	L	L	W
Damash	D	D	W	L	W	L	D	L	L	D	D	D	W	D	W	L	W	D	L	W	D	L	L	L	W	L	D	L	W	W	L	L	W	W
Fajr Sepasi	W	W	W	L	D	D	L	W	D	W	D	D	L	W	L	D	L	L	L	D	W	D	W	D	L	L	L	W	L	D	L	D	W	D
Malavan	W	D	W	W	D	L	D	D	L	L	W	W	W	W	L	D	W	D	D	L	L	D	L	W	L	D	L	D	D	D	L	D	L	L
Zob Ahan	L	L	L	L	L	W	L	W	L	W	D	L	D	D	L	D	L	W	D	D	L	W	D	L	L	L	D	W	D	W	D	D	W	W
Aluminium Hormozgan	L	D	D	D	D	L	W	L	D	L	D	W	L	L	W	D	D	L	W	D	L	L	W	D	L	D	D	L	D	L	W	W	L	D
Sanat Naft	L	D	L	L	L	W	D	D	D	L	L	D	L	D	L	D	D	D	D	D	L	L	L	D	L	D	L	W	L	L	L	W	L	W
Paykan	L	D	L	W	W	W	L	W	L	L	L	D	D	L	W	D	D	L	L	L	L	L	L	L	W	L	L	L	D	L	L	D	L	L
Gahar Zagros	L	L	D	L	W	D	D	L	L	D	L	D	L	L	L	L	D	D	W	L	W	L	L	D	L	L	D	L	L	L	L	L	L	L

Source: IPL Stats
W = Win; D = Draw; L = Lose

== Relegation play-offs ==
Zob Ahan as 14th-placed team faced play-off winner of 2012–13 Azadegan League, Pas Hamedan in a two-legged play-off.

21 June 2013
20:00 CEST

Zob Ahan	4–2	Pas Hamedan
Heidari 2'; Farhadi 6', 58'; Bayatinia 45+1'	report	Rabiekhah 71'; Aliabadi 90+2'

Fooladshahr, Isfahan
Attendance: 5,000
Referee: Mohsen Torky
26 June 2013
19:30 CEST

Pas Hamedan	1–1	Zob Ahan
Aliabadi 4' (pen.)	report	Rajabzadeh 30' (pen.)

Qods, Hamedan
Attendance: 4,000
Referee: Saeid Mozaffarizadeh

Zob Ahan won 5–3 on aggregate and retained its Iran Pro League spot for the 2013–14 season.

== Season statistics ==
=== Top goalscorers ===
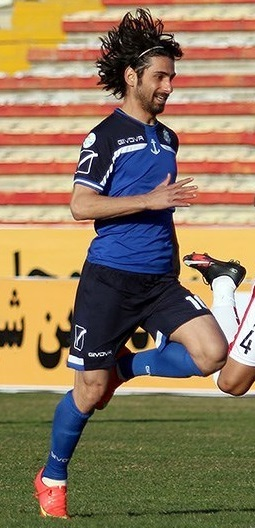
Jalal Rafkhaei

Position	Player	Club	Goals
1	(Iran) Jalal Rafkhaei	Malavan	19
2	(Iran) Mehdi Seyed Salehi	Tractor Sazi	16
3	(Iran) Mohammad Reza Khalatbari	Sepahan	14
3	(Iran) Mostafa Shojaei	Mes Kerman	14
5	(Brazil) Chimba	Foolad	12
6	(Iran) Saeid Daghighi	Saipa	11
6	(Iran) Reza Enayati	Mes Kerman	11
6	(Albania) Xhevahir Sukaj	Sepahan	11
9	(Iran) Arash Borhani	Esteghlal	10
9	(Iran) Yaghoub Karimi	Naft Tehran	10
9	(Portugal) Flávio Paixão	Tractor Sazi	10
12	(Iran) Farzad Hatami	Esteghlal	9
13	(Iran) Karim Ansarifard	Persepolis	8
13	(Iran) Omid Ebrahimi	Sepahan	8
13	(Iran) Alireza Jahanbakhsh	Damash	8
Total goals (Including technical loses)			686
Total games			306
Average per game			2.24

Last updated: 10 May 2013
Source: IPL Stats

=== Clean sheets ===
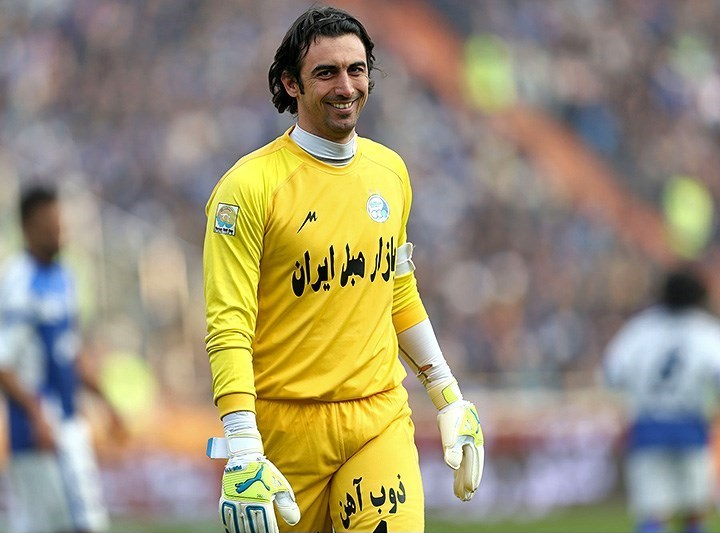
Mehdi Rahmati

Position	Player	Club	Clean sheets	Goals conceded
1	(Iran) Mehdi Rahmati	Esteghlal	21	18
2	(Iran) Rahman Ahmadi	Saipa	15	29
3	(Brazil) Nilson Corrêa Júnior	Persepolis	14	21
4	(Iran) Arman Shahdadnejad	Mes Kerman	13	16
5	(Iran) Sosha Makani	Naft Tehran	11	15
6	(Armenia) Gevorg Kasparov	Zob Ahan	8	12
6	(Iran) Hamed Lak	Saba Qom	8	23
8	(Brazil) Fábio Carvalho	Paykan	7	54
8	(Iran) Shahab Gordan	Sepahan	7	23
8	(Montenegro) Milan Mijatovic	Mes Kerman	7	5
8	(Iran) Vahid Sheikhveisi	Fajr Sepasi	7	24
8	(Iran) Ershad Yousefi	Foolad	7	22
13	(Iran) Habib Dehghani	Sanat Naft	6	34
13	(Iran) Hamed Fallahzadeh	Naft Tehran	6	12
13	(Brazil) Luiz Fernando	Aluminium	6	20
13	(Iran) Mojtaba Roshangar	Aluminium	6	18
13	(Iran) Shahram Mehraban	Gahar	6	43
13	(Iran) Mehdi Sabeti	Tractor Sazi	6	14
19	(Iran) Farshid Karimi	Rah Ahan	5	24
19	(Iran) Milad Farahani	Damash Gilan	5	25
19	(Iran) Mohammad Mohammadi	Rah Ahan	5	9
19	(Iran) Hassan Roudbarian	Damash Gilan	5	22
23	(Iran) Ali Hassani Sefat	Malavan	4	11

Last Update: 10 May 2013

=== Scoring ===
- First goal of the season: Mehdi Nazari for Fajr against Zob Ahan (19 July 2012)
- Fastest goal of the season: 12 seconds, Gholamreza Rezaei for Persepolis against Fajr Sepasi (30 December 2012)
- Latest goal of the season: 96 minutes and 12 seconds, Karim Ansarifard for Persepolis against Zob Ahan (19 November 2012)
- Largest winning margin: 6 goals
  - Persepolis 6–0 Paykan (31 October 2012)
  - Fajr 6–0 Aluminium (1 March 2013)
  - Zob Ahan 6–0 Sanat Naft (5 May 2013)
- Highest scoring game: 8 goals
  - Damash 5–3 Paykan (31 July 2012)
  - Sanat Naft 2–6 Naft Tehran (6 August 2012)
- Most goals scored in a match by a single team: 6 goals
  - Sanat Naft 2–6 Naft Tehran (18 August 2012)
  - Fajr 6–1 Damash (15 September 2012)
  - Persepolis 6–0 Paykan (31 October 2012)
  - Fajr 6–0 Aluminium (1 March 2013)
- Most goals scored in a match by a losing team: 3 goals
  - Damash 5–3 Paykan (31 July 2012)
  - Naft Tehran 3–4 Sepahan (30 October 2012)
  - Sepahan 4–3 Zob Ahan (13 January 2013)

=== Hat-tricks ===
Player	For	Against	Result	Date
(Iran) Jalal Rafkhaei	Malavan	Saba Qom	3–1	30 July 2012
(Iran) Yaghoub Karimi	Naft Tehran	Sanat Naft	6–2	6 August 2012
(Iran) Jaber Ansari	Fajr Sepasi	Damash Gilan	6–1	15 September 2012
(Iran) Karim Ansarifard	Persepolis	Paykan	6–0	31 October 2012
(Iran) Iman Razaghirad	Saba Qom	Sanat Naft	3–2	24 January 2013
(Iran) Mostafa Shojaei	Mes	Gahar	5–1	5 May 2013

== Awards ==
=== Team of the Season ===
Goalkeeper: Mehdi Rahmati (Esteghlal)
Defence: Mehrdad Jama'ati (Foolad), Pejman Montazeri (Esteghlal), Amir Hossein Sadeghi (Esteghlal), Khosro Heydari (Esteghlal)
Midfield: Reza Haghighi (Perspolis), Bakhtiar Rahmani (Foolad), Moharram Navidkia (Sepahan), Yaghoub Karimi (Naft.t)
Attack: Jalal Rafkhaei (Malavan), Mohammad Reza Khalatbari (Sepahan)

=== Player of the Season ===
Moharram Navidkia was awarded as the best player of the season among Mehdi Rahmati and Pejman Montazeri became second and third. Saeid Ezzatollahi was also awarded as the best young player of the season and Alireza Jahanbakhsh was ranked second.

=== Other awards ===
Amir Ghalenoei was awarded as the best coach of the season, Zlatko Kranjčar becomes second and Hossein Faraki third. Saeid Mozafarizadeh awarded best referee, Fair Play Award was given to the Fajr Sepasi and Esteghlal was the team of the season. Mehdi Mahdavikia, Ali Parvin, Homayoun Behzadi and Ali Jabari were also awarded for their service to the Iranian football.

== Attendances ==
=== Average home attendances ===
Pos	Team	Total	High	Low	Average	Change
1	Esteghlal	548,000	100,000	0	34,250	+7.8%
2	Tractor Sazi	409,000	50,000	2,000	24,059	−39.1%
3	Persepolis	326,000	90,000	0	21,733	−23.0%
4	Aluminium Hormozgan	125,000	20,000	2,000	7,353	+45.5%
5	Damash	101,000	15,000	0	6,733	−17.1%
6	Sanat Naft	103,000	15,000	1,000	6,059	−38.3%
7	Malavan	102,000	8,000	3,000	6,000	+15.7%
8	Gahar Zagros	99,000	65,000	1,000	5,824	−5.4%
9	Foolad	92,000	20,000	1,000	5,412	+16.5%
10	Fajr Sepasi	83,100	20,000	1,000	4,888	−36.1%
11	Saipa	80,500	40,000	1,000	4,735	+117.6%
12	Sepahan	67,500	10,000	1,000	3,971	−32.5%
13	Mes Kerman	65,000	15,000	1,000	3,824	−35.0%
14	Saba Qom	46,000	10,000	1,000	2,706	−24.6%
15	Naft Tehran	44,000	15,000	1,000	2,588	+25.7%
16	Paykan	37,000	12,000	1,000	2,176	+142.9%
17	Zob Ahan	36,000	8,000	1,000	2,118	−25.0%
18	Rah Ahan	33,000	7,000	1,000	1,942	−13.1%
	League total	2,397,100	100,000	0	7,964	−16.1%

Updated to games played on 10 May 2013
Source: Iranleague.ir
Notes:
Matches with spectator bans are not included in average attendances
Aluminium Hormozgan, Gahar Zagros and Paykan played last season in Azadegan League

=== Highest attendances ===
Rank	Home team	Score	Away team	Attendance	Date	Week	Stadium
1	Esteghlal	0–0	Persepolis	100,000	25 January 2013	23	Azadi
1	Esteghlal	1–2	Damash	100,000	10 May 2013	34	Azadi
3	Persepolis	0–0	Esteghlal	90,000	24 August 2012	6	Azadi
4	Esteghlal	1–0	Tractor Sazi	75,000	8 March 2013	29	Azadi
5	Gahar Zagros	1–1	Persepolis	65,000	30 July 2012	3	Azadi
5	Persepolis	0–2	Saba Qom	65,000	5 August 2012	4	Azadi
7	Esteghlal	1–1	Sepahan	60,000	16 April 2013	30	Azadi
8	Esteghlal	1–0	Aluminium Hormozgan	50,000	20 July 2012	1	Azadi
8	Tractor Sazi	2–0	Esteghlal	50,000	20 October 2012	12	Sahand
10	Saipa	2–1	Esteghlal	40,000	25 July 2012	2	Azadi

Notes:
Updated to games played on 10 May 2013. Source: Iranleague.ir

== See also ==
- 2012–13 Hazfi Cup
- 2012–13 Azadegan League
- 2012–13 Iran Football's 2nd Division
- 2012–13 Iran Football's 3rd Division
- 2012–13 Iranian Futsal Super League

=== Team season articles ===
- 2012–13 Persepolis F.C. season
- 2012–13 Sepahan F.C. season
- 2012–13 Esteghlal F.C. season
- 2012–13 Saba Qom F.C. season
- 2012–13 S.C. Damash season
- 2012–13 Fajr Sepasi F.C. season
