= 2014–15 Azadegan League =

24th season of Azadegan League

Azadegan League
- Season: 2014–15
- Champions: Foolad Novin; 1st Azadegan League title
- Promoted: Siah Jamegan Khorasan; Esteghlal Ahvaz
- Relegated: Niroye Zamini; Naft va Gaz Gachsaran; Tarbiat Yazd; Shahrdari Tabriz; Rahian Kermanshah; Shahrdari Bandar Abbas; Etka Gorgan
- Matches: 253
- Goals: 475 (1.88 per match)
- Top goalscorer: Issa Alekasir (11 goals)
- Biggest home win: Sanat Naft 4–1 Parseh (23 October 2014); Rahian Kermanshah 3–0 Sh. Bandar Abbas (8 November 2014); Mes Kerman 3–0 Fajr Sepasi (19 November 2014)
- Biggest away win: Gol Gohar 1–3 Mes Rafsanjan (10 October 2014)
- Highest scoring: Parseh 4–3 Etka Gorgan (10 October 2014); Niroye Zamini 4–3 Naft va Gaz Gachsaran (21 October 2014); Aluminium Hormozgan 5–2 Sh. Ardabil (25 November 2014)

The 2014–15 Azadegan League was the 24th season of the Azadegan League and 14th as the second highest division since its establishment in 1991. The season featured 16 teams from the 2013–14 Azadegan League, three new teams relegated from the 2013–14 Persian Gulf Cup (Fajr Sepasi, Damash and Mes Kerman) and four new teams promoted from the 2013–14 2nd Division (Shahrdari Ardabil and Etka Gorgan both as champions and Foolad Novin and Shahrdari Tabriz). Tarbiat Yazd replaced Yazd Louleh. The league started on 4 October 2014 and ended on 22 April 2015. Foolad Novin won the Azadegan League title for the first time in their history. Siah Jamegan and Esteghlal Ahvaz were promoted to the Persian Gulf Pro League.

== Start of season ==
- The league is feature to three teams relegated from Iran Pro League in 2013–14; Mes Kerman, Fajr Sepasi and Damash Gilan.
- It featured four teams promoted from 2013–14 2nd Division: Shahrdari Ardabil, Etka Gorgan, Foolad Novin, and Shahrdari Tabriz.

== Changes ==
- Two fewer teams participate in the 2014–15 Azadegan League, compared to the previous year.

== Teams ==
=== Group A ===
Locations of clubs in 2014–15 Azadegan League

Team	City	Venue	Capacity	Head coach
Aluminium	Bandar Abbas	Persian Gulf	20,000	(Iran) Majid Namjoo-Motlagh
Esteghlal Ahvaz	Ahvaz	Takhti Ahvaz	30,000	(Iran) Daroush Yazdi
Fajr Sepasi	Shiraz	Hafezieh	6,000	(Iran) Ali Kalantari
Foolad Novin	Ahvaz	Foolad	5,000	(Iran) Koroush Mousavi
Giti Pasand	Isfahan	Foolad Shahr	20,000	(Armenia) Vahik Torosian
Iranjavan	Bushehr	Shahid Beheshti	15,000	(Iran) Gholamreza Delgarm
Mes Kerman	Kerman	Shahid Bahonar	15,430	(Iran) Akbar Misaghian
Naft Gachsaran	Gachsaran	Naft Gachsaran	2,000	(Iran) Abbas Chamanyan
Nassaji	Qa'em Shahr	Vatani	15,000	(Iran) Nader Dastneshan
Niroo Zamini	Tehran	Takhti Tehran	30,000	(Iran) Ali Rozbahani
Shahrdari Ardabil	Ardabil	Ali Daei	20,000	(Iran) Mehdi Dinvarzadeh
Tarbiat Yazd	Yazd	Nassiri	6,000	(Iran) Mahmoud Amiri

=== Group B ===
Locations of clubs in 2014–15 Azadegan League

Team	City	Venue	Capacity	Head coach
Damash	Rasht	Dr. Azodi	11,000	(Iran) Omid Harandi
Etka	Gorgan	Karim Abad	15,000	(Iran) Saket Elhami
Foolad Yazd	Yazd	Nassiri	6,000	(Croatia) Dinko Jeličić
Gol Gohar	Sirjan	Imam Ali	2,000	(Iran) Ghasem Shahba
Mes Rafsanjan	Rafsanjan	Shohada	10,000	(Croatia) Vinko Begović
Parseh Tehran	Tehran	Kargaran	5,000	(Iran) Bahman Abedini
Pas Hamedan	Hamedan	Qods	10,000	(Iran) Davoud Mahabadi
Rahian Kermanshah	Kermanshah	Azadi	7,000	(Iran) Ahmad Sanjari
Sanat Naft	Abadan	Takhti Abadan	22,000	(Portugal) Carlos Manuel
Siah Jamegan	Mashhad	Samen	35,000	(Iran) Reza Mohajeri
Shahrdari Bandar Abbas	Bandar Abbas	Takhti Bandar Abbas	10,000	(Iran) Hamidreza Farzaneh
Shahrdari Tabriz	Tabriz	Bagh Shomal	20,000	(Iran) Mehdi Pashazadeh

== Standings ==
=== Group A ===
Pos	Team	Pld	W	D	L	GF	GA	GD	Pts	Promotion or relegation
1	Foolad Novin (C, P)	22	12	6	4	36	19	+17	42	2015–16 Persian Gulf Pro League
2	Mes Kerman (Q)	22	10	6	6	23	18	+5	36	Azadegan League 2014–15 Play Off
3	Nassaji Mazandaran	22	9	7	6	23	20	+3	34	
4	Aluminium Hormozgan	22	8	8	6	21	18	+3	32	
5	Fajr Sepasi	22	7	9	6	22	17	+5	30	
6	Sh. Ardabil	22	8	6	8	24	23	+1	30	
7	Giti Pasand	22	7	8	7	26	22	+4	29	
8	Iranjavan	22	7	8	7	19	21	−2	29	
9	Est. Ahvaz (R)	22	8	5	9	15	19	−4	29	Relegation Play Off
10	Niroye Zamini (R)	22	7	7	8	16	17	−1	28	Relegation to 2015–16 Iran Football's 2nd Division
11	Naft va Gaz Gachsaran (R)	22	6	7	9	22	28	−6	25	Relegation to 2015–16 Iran Football's 2nd Division
12	Tarbiat Yazd (R)	22	2	5	15	8	33	−25	11	Relegation to 2015–16 Iran Football's 2nd Division

Updated to match(es) played on 28 April 2015. Source:
Rules for classification: 1) points; 2) goal difference; 3) number of goals scored.
(C) Champions; (P) Promoted; (Q) Qualified for the phase indicated; (R) Relegated

=== Group B ===
Pos	Team	Pld	W	D	L	GF	GA	GD	Pts	Promotion or relegation
1	Siah Jamegan (P)	21	11	6	4	25	15	+10	39	2015–16 Persian Gulf Pro League
2	Mes Rafsanjan (Q)	21	10	7	4	20	12	+8	37	Azadegan League 2014–15 Play Off
3	PAS Hamedan	21	10	7	4	19	13	+6	37	
4	Parseh Tehran	21	9	7	5	26	22	+4	34	
5	Sanat Naft	21	9	6	6	22	17	+5	33	
6	Damash	21	6	9	6	19	20	−1	27	
7	Gol Gohar	21	5	9	7	18	20	−2	24	
8	Foolad Yazd	21	5	9	7	16	21	−5	24	
9	Sh. Tabriz	21	4	10	7	21	20	+1	22	Relegation Play Off
10	Rahian Kermanshah (R)	21	5	7	9	12	16	−4	22	Relegation to 2015–16 Iran Football's 2nd Division
11	Sh. Bandar Abbas (R)	21	3	7	11	12	24	−12	16	Relegation to 2015–16 Iran Football's 2nd Division
12	Etka Gorgan (R)	11	1	2	8	10	20	−10	5	Relegation to 2015–16 Iran Football's 2nd Division

Updated to match(es) played on 29 April 2015. Source:
Rules for classification: 1) points; 2) goal difference; 3) number of goals scored.
(P) Promoted; (Q) Qualified for the phase indicated; (R) Relegated

== Azadegan League play-off ==
Team 1	Agg.	Team 2	1st leg	2nd leg
Mes Rafsanjan	0–1	Mes Kerman	0–0	0–1

Mes Kerman as 2nd-placed team of Group A will faced Mes Rafsanjan as 2nd-placed team of Group B in a two-legged Play-off.

6 May 2015
15:00 CEST

Mes Rafsanjan	0 – 0	Mes Kerman
	Report

Shohadaye Noushabad, Rafsanjan
Attendance: 4,000
12 May 2015
15:30 CEST

Mes Kerman	1 - 0	Mes Rafsanjan
Bagheri 73'	Report

Shahid Bahonar, Kerman
Attendance: 8,000

Mes Kerman won 1–0 on aggregate and receives its place in the relegation Play-off of the Persian Gulf Pro League.

== Relegation play-off (Persian Gulf Pro League) ==
Team 1	Agg.	Team 2	1st leg	2nd leg
Esteghlal Khuzestan	3–0	Mes Kerman	1–0	2–0

Esteghlal Khuzestan as 14th-placed team will faced Play-off winner of 2014–15 Azadegan League, Mes Kerman in a two-legged Play-off.

25 May 2015
16:00 CEST

Esteghlal Khuzestan	1 – 0	Mes Kerman
Momeni 90+5'

Ghadir, Ahvaz
Attendance: 2,500
30 May 2015
15:30 CEST

Mes Kerman	0 - 2	Esteghlal Khuzestan
		Diawara 56'; Diawara 79'

Shahid Bahonar, Kerman
Attendance: 15,000

Esteghlal Khuzestan won 3–0 on aggregate and retained its place in the next edition of the Persian Gulf Pro League.

== Relegation play-off (Azadegan League) ==
Team 1	Agg.	Team 2	1st leg	2nd leg
Shahrdari Tabriz	3–3 (a)	Esteghlal Ahvaz	1–0	2–3

Esteghlal Ahvaz as 9th-placed team of Group A will faced Shahrdari Tabriz as 9th-placed team of Group B in a two-legged Play-off.

11 May 2015
14:30 CEST

Shahrdari Tabriz	1 – 0	Esteghlal Ahvaz
Gharedaghi 40'	Report

Marzdaran, Tabriz
Attendance: 1,000
18 May 2015
15:30 CEST

Esteghlal Ahvaz	3 – 2	Shahrdari Tabriz
Sinak 44'; Vadadi 88'; Mirghorbani 90'	Report	Ashoubi 22'; Ranjbari 54'

Takhti Ahvaz, Ahvaz
Attendance: 2,000

3–3 on aggregate. Shahrdari Tabriz won on away goals.

== Final ==
Team 1	Score	Team 2
Foolad Novin	1–0	Siah Jamegan

Siah Jamegan as winner of Group A will faced Foolad Novin as winner of Group B in a final.

8 May 2015

Foolad Novin	1 – 0	Siah Jamegan
Janfaza 28'	Report

Foolad Khuzestan Stadium, Ahvaz
Attendance: 2,000
Referee: Saeid Rahimi Moghadam

Foolad Novin become champions of the league for the first time in their history.
