= Mehdi Mohammadi (football manager) =

Iranian football coach and manager

Personal information
- Full name: Mehdi Mohammadi
- Date of birth: October 10, 1952
- Place of birth: Kerman, Iran
- Date of death: September 7, 2013 (aged 60)
- Place of death: Kerman, Iran
- Position: Defender

Youth career
- 1970–1973: Rah Ahan

Senior career*
Years	Team	Apps	(Gls)
1973–1980	Rah Ahan		

Managerial career
- 1998–1999: Mes Kerman B
- 1999–2013: Mes Kerman (Assistant)
- 2009: Mes Kerman (Caretaker)
- 2013: Mes Kerman (Caretaker)
- * Club domestic league appearances and goals

Mehdi Mohammadi (Persian: مهدی محمدی; 10 October 1952 – 7 September 2013) was an Iranian football coach who served as assistant manager at Mes Kerman for more than ten years. He managed Mes Kerman two times as the caretaker manager of the club, first from November to December 2009 after the sacking of Parviz Mazloomi and the second in 2013 after Ebrahim Ghasempour resigned as the manager of the club.
