= Mohammadreza Jounakizadeh =

Iranian footballer

Personal information
- Full name: Mohammadreza Jounakizadeh
- Place of birth: Khuzestan Province, Iran
- Position: Goalkeeper

Senior career*
Years	Team	Apps	(Gls)
- Sanat Naft
1998–2001	Foolad		
2001–2002	Persepolis	2	(0)
- Esteghlal Ahvaz
- Aflak Lorestan
- * Club domestic league appearances and goals

Mohammadreza Jounakizadeh (Persian: محمدرضا جونکی‌زاده) was an Iranian football goalkeeper who played for Persepolis in 2001–02 Iran Pro League. He left the club at the end of season and joined Esteghlal Ahvaz.

== Club career ==
=== Club career statistics ===
Club performance			League		Cup		Continental		Total	
Season	Club	League	Apps	Goals	Apps	Goals	Apps	Goals	Apps	Goals
Iran			League		Hazfi Cup		Asia		Total	
2001–02	Persepolis	Iran Pro League	2	0	0	0	-	-	2	0
Career total			2	0	0	0	-	-	2	0
