= F.C. Rayka Babol =

Iranian football club

Rayka Babol رایکا بابل
- Full name: Football Club Rayka Babol
- Nicknames: Rikahay Babol (Boys of Babol); Shirhaye Babol (Lions of Babol)
- Founded: 1 January 2013 as Khooneh be Khooneh Babol
- Dissolved: 2022
- Ground: Shohada-ye Hafom-e Tir Stadium
- Capacity: 5,000
- Owner(s): Peyman Moniri; Ali Akbar Jafarnezhad
- Chairman: Saman Hashemi
- Manager: Pirouz Ghorbani
- League: Azadegan League
- 2022-23: Azadegan League, 10th
- Website: http://fckhoonehbekhooneh.com/
Home colours	Away colours	Third colours

Football Club Rayka Babol (Persian: باشگاه فوتبال رایکا بابل, Bashgah-e Futbal-e Raika Babol) is an Iranian football club based in Babol, Mazandaran.

== History ==
In 2013, Mazani chain store company from Babol, Khooneh Be Khooneh bought Bahman's certificate to take part in 3rd Division Football League. Previously, Khooneh Be Khooneh had successful experiences with their team in wrestling. With Farshad Pious as their manager they got their first promotion in their first season.

After appointing Hamid Derakhshan midway through the season as manager in their first season at second tier of Iranian football, the team went on a disastrous run and missed out on promotion. However at the end of the season, Alireza Marzban the coach of Azadegan League champions Paykan announced he had taken over as manager. In 2016–17 season following high hopes with Marzban as the coach, after suffering from some weak results, specially their 3–0 defeat against their rival Baadraan, club and manager decided to take separate ways from about middle of the season. Then Levon Stepanyan and Alireza Emamifar took over and co-managed the team against Pars Jonoubi Jam and Sepidrood as caretakers. After a little while Nader Dastneshan managed the team for the rest of the season and failed to promote to upper division.

In 2017–18, they chose former national team captain and assistant manager Javad Nekounam as their manager. Being under Carlos Queiroz for a few months, Nekounam started his first season as manager with brilliant vision and strong ideas. He got great results with the team in the league and led them to the Hazfi Cup semi-final. Just after losing the first game of his season with Khooneh Be Khooneh, he resigned from his position and soon after losing his second game of the season he left the club. He later signed for the other Mazani club Nassaji and later led them into the Persian Gulf Pro League after 24 years out of it. Later the club replaced Nekounam with Croatian coach Dragan Skočić. Although Skočić got great results with the team and even went on an unbeaten streak for 11 games and also led the team to the Hazfi Cup final, he failed to promote the team in the last week because of goal difference and with Nassaji in the table after.

== Honours ==
=== Domestic ===
- Hazfi Cup

Runners-up (1): 2017–18

== Season-by-season ==
The table below shows the achievements of the club in various competitions.

Season	League	Position	Hazfi Cup	Notes
2013–14	3rd Division	2nd	Fourth Round	Promote
2014–15	2nd Division	4th	Fourth Round
2015–16	Azadegan League	6th	Didn't enter
2016–17	Azadegan League	6th	Third Round
2017–18	Azadegan League	3rd	Runners-up
2018–19	Azadegan League	12th	Third Round
2019–20	Azadegan League	13th	Didn't enter
2020–21	Azadegan League

Notes

- ^{R} buy the right to play in Azadegan League from Bahman Shiraz.

== Current managerial staff ==
Position	Staff
Head coach	(Iran) Pirouz Ghorbani
Assistant coach	(Iran) Ali Ashourizad
Assistant coach	(Iran) Mehran Barzegar
Fitness coach	
Goalkeeper coach	(Iran) Hamid Sajjadi
Team manager	(Iran) Ebrahim Mahmoudi

== Managerial history ==
As of 2 May 2018.

Seasons	Manager	Nationality
2012–2013	Mohammad Ghorbanian	(Iran)
2013–2014	Farshad Pious	(Iran)
2014	Morteza Kermani Moghaddam *	(Iran)
2014–2015	Farhad Kazemi	(Iran)
2015–2016	Akbar Misaghian	(Iran)
2016	Hamid Derakhshan	(Iran)
2016	Hossein Rahmani *	(Iran)
2016–2017	Alireza Marzban	(Iran)
2017	Levon Stepanyan * Alireza Emamifar *	(Armenia) (Iran)
2017	Nader Dastneshan	(Iran)

Seasons	Manager	Nationality
2017	Hossein Rahmani *	(Iran)
2017–2018	Javad Nekounam	(Iran)
2018	Dragan Skočić	(Croatia)
2018	Ali Nazarmohammadi	(Iran)
2018–2019	Akbar Misaghian	(Iran)
2019	Mehran Najafi	(Iran)
2019	Hossein Mesgar Saravi	(Iran)
2019	Hadi Shakouri	(Iran)
2019	Ali Nazarmohammadi	(Iran)
2019–2020	Rahman Rezaei	(Iran)
2020	Ali Nazarmohammadi	(Iran)
2020–2021	Nader Dastneshan	(Iran)
2021–	Pirouz Ghorbani	(Iran)
