= Farshad Janfaza =

Iranian footballer

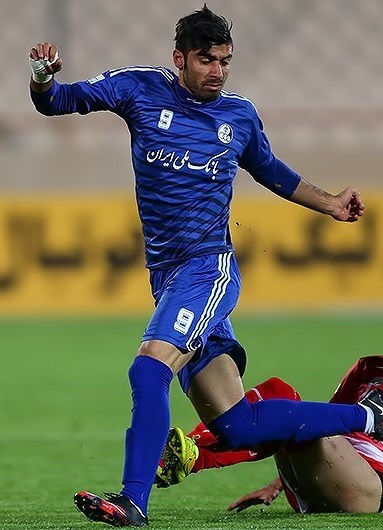

Personal information
- Full name: Farshad Janfaza
- Date of birth: January 15, 1993 (age 33)
- Place of birth: Baghmalek, Iran
- Height: 1.85 m (6 ft 1 in)
- Position: Striker

Team information
- Current team: Naft Masjed Soleyman
- Number: 9

Youth career
- 2008–2014: Foolad

Senior career*
Years	Team	Apps	(Gls)
2014–2015	Foolad B	15	(3)
2015–2017	Esteghlal Khuzestan	27	(4)
2017–2018	Foolad	25	(4)
2018–	Naft Masjed Soleyman	12	(1)
- * Club domestic league appearances and goals as of 20 November 2017

Farshad Janfaza (Persian: فرشاد جانفزا) is an Iranian football forward who plays for Naft Masjed Soleyman in the Persian Gulf Pro League.

== Club career ==
Janfaza started his career with Foolad from youth levels. He moved to Foolad Novin in 2014. He was a regular starter in promoting to Persian Gulf Pro League in 2015. In Summer 2015, He joined to Esteghlal Khuzestan.

== Club career statistics ==
As of 30 July 2015.

Club	Division	Season	League		Hazfi Cup		Asia		Total	
Club	Division	Season	Apps	Goals	Apps	Goals	Apps	Goals	Apps	Goals
Foolad Novin	Division 1	2014–15	15	3	0	0	–	–	15	3
Esteghlal Khuzestan	Pro League	2015–16	11	2	1	0	–	–	12	2
Career totals			27	5	1	0	0	0	28	5

== Honours ==
=== Club ===
Foolad Novin

- Azadegan League (1): 2014–15

Esteghlal Khuzestan

- Iran Pro League (1): 2015–16
- Iranian Super Cup runner-up: 2016
