= 2019 Hazfi Cup final =

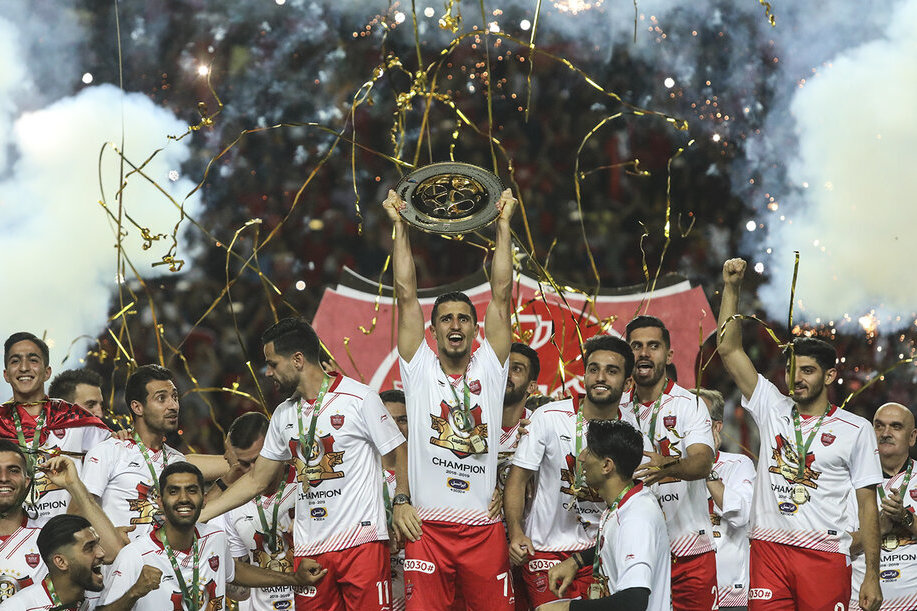
- Event: 2018–19 Hazfi Cup
Damash	Persepolis
0	1
- Date: 2 June 2019
- Venue: Foolad Arena, Ahvaz
- Man of the Match: Siamak Nemati
- Referee: Mooud Bonyadifar
- Attendance: 30,000
- Weather: Clear; 38 °C (100 °F); 12% humidity

The 2019 Hazfi Cup final was the 32nd final since 1975. The match was held between Persepolis and Damash in Foolad Arena, Ahvaz.

In this match Persepolis won 1–0 against Damash and won the championship of this competition.

== Details ==
2 June 2019
23:20 (UTC+4:30)

Damash	0 – 1	Persepolis
		Alipour 23'

Foolad Arena, Ahvaz
Attendance: 30,000
Referee: Mooud Bonyadifar
