= Luiz Fernando Santos =

Brazilian footballer

Personal information
- Full name: Luiz Fernando Claudino dos Santos
- Date of birth: April 26, 1982 (age 44)
- Place of birth: Ibiporã, Brazil
- Height: 1.90 m (6 ft 3 in)
- Position: Goalkeeper

Team information
- Current team: Esteghlal Ahvaz F.C.
- Number: 22

Youth career
- 1998–1999: Portuguesa Londrinense
- 1999–2002: Vasco da Gama

Senior career*
Years	Team	Apps	(Gls)
2003–2004	Ituano		
2004–2005	Caldense		
2005–2006	Tupi		
2007	América		
2008	Londrina		(0)
2008–2014	Aluminium Hormozgan	89	(0)
2015	Caldas Novas		
2015	U.R.T/MG		
2015–2016	Esteghlal Ahvaz	20	(0)
- * Club domestic league appearances and goals as of 29 April 2014

Luiz Fernando Claudino dos Santos (born 26 April 1982, in Ibiporã) is a Brazilian football goalkeeper who currently plays for Esteghlal Ahvaz in the Persian Gulf Pro League.

== Club career ==
Before transferring to Aluminium Hormozgan in 2009, dos Santos played with several teams in Brazil, including Vasco da Gama and Caldense.

Club performance			League	
Season	Club	League	Apps	Goals
Iran			League	
2009–10	Aluminium	Division 1	13	0
2010–11	Aluminium	Division 1	24	0
2011–12	Aluminium	Division 1	16	0
2012–13	Aluminium	Pro League	16	0
2013–14	Aluminium	Division 1	20	0
Career total			89	0
