= Majid Jahanpour =

Iranian former Football player and coach (born 1948)

Personal information
- Date of birth: March 7, 1948 (age 78)
- Place of birth: Rasht، Iran

Team information
- Current team: S.C. Damash (manager)

Senior career*
Years	Team	Apps	(Gls)
1968–?	Rah Ahan		
?–?	Sepidrood Rasht		

Managerial career
- 1990: Esteghlal Rasht
- 1992–?: Iran (futsal) (assistant)
- 1996–1997: Sepidrood Rasht
- 2000–2001: Esteghlal Rasht
- 2002: Esteghlal Rasht
- 2002–2004: Pegah
- 2006–2007: Pegah
- 2015–2016: S.C. Damash
- * Club domestic league appearances and goals

Majid Jahanpour (Persian: مجید جهانپور, March 7, 1948) is a former Iranian Football player and coach who played for Rah Ahan and Sepidrood Rasht. Jahanpour currently coaches club S.C. Damash
