= Sanat Mes Kerman F.C. =

Iranian football club

Mes Kerman مس کرمان
- Full name: Sanat Mes Kerman Football Club
- Founded: 2 March 1998
- Ground: Shohadaye Mes Kerman Stadium
- Capacity: 30,000
- Owner: NICICO
- Chairman: Mohammadtaghi Amirikhorasani
- Head Coach: Farzad Hosseinkhani
- League: Azadegan League
- 2024–25: Azadegan League, 11th
- Website: http://mes-fc.ir/
| Home colours | Away colours | Third colours |

Mes Kerman Football Club (Persian: باشگاه فوتبال صنعت مس کرمان, Bashgah-e Futbal-e Sân't-e Mes Kârman) is an Iranian professional football team based in Kerman, Iran.

They were promoted to Iran's top league, the Iran Pro League, in the 2005–06 season. They won their only domestic double in 2006–2007 season. They were relegated in the 2013–14 season. The team is named after and sponsored by Kerman's copper industries (Persian: مس romanized: mes).

Mes Kerman F.C. is a football section of the multisport Sanat Mes Kerman Cultural and Athletic Club.

== History ==
=== Establishment ===
Mes Kerman Football Club was formed on 2 March 1998 by Kerman's copper industry. The national Iranian copper industry had already formed a football team in Rasfanjan a year prior. They started playing in Iran Football's 2nd Division and were promoted to the Azadegan League in 2000. Bijan Zolfagharnasab was appointed in 2000 as head coach of the club after the team was promoted to the Azadegan League.

=== Azadegan League (2000–2007) ===
They were promoted to the Azadegan League in 2000–01 season. In 2005–06 season under management of Nader Dastneshan, the club was promoted to the IPL for the 2006–07 season.

=== Persian Gulf Cup (2007–2014) ===
They started the league in 2007 with Farhad Kazemi but he was replaced by Amir Ghalenoei halfway through the season where they finished second in the second half of the season league. Parviz Mazloomi was appointed in 2008 as the head coach and the club was promoted to the AFC Champions League for the first time in their history by finishing third in the league. Mes surprisingly progressed to the last 16 and but got knocked out by fellow countrymen Zob Ahan. In that same season the club finished ninth in the league.

=== Return to Azadegan League ===
In the 2013–14 Iran Pro League season, Mes finished bottom of the league and were relegated to the Azadegan League with one matchday left. In the same season, Mes reached the 2014 Hazfi Cup Final, losing 1–0 to Tractor Sazi. On 27 April 2015 after a 0–0 draw against Aluminium Hormozgan, Mes Kerman secured a spot in the Persian Gulf Pro League promotion play-off. However, they lost to Esteghlal Khuzestan to miss the qualification. Riots ensued in the stadium afterwards as Mes fans set fires to the seats.

In March 2016 Mes Kerman coach Begovic was replaced with Akbar Misaghian.

== Colours and crest ==
The home kit includes an orange shirt, white shorts, and white or black socks. White and black colours are also seen in the kit. The away kit of the club is usually dominated by a white background.

== Stadium and facilities ==
The club currently plays its home games at Kerman's Bahonar Stadium, but the club announced plans to build its own football only stadium. Construction started on July 13, 2004, for the 15,000 capacity stadium.

== Ownership ==
The owner of the Mes Kerman FC is National Mes Company.

== Sponsorship ==
| Period | Kit manufacturer | Shirt sponsor |
|---|---|---|
| 2007–08 | (Iran) Merooj | (Iran) Mahan Air |
| 2008–09 | (Iran) Merooj | (Iran) Mahan Air |
| 2009–10 | (Iran) Merooj | (Iran) Mahan Air |
| 2010–11 | (Germany) Uhlsport | (Iran) Yas Travel Agency |
| 2011–12 | (Germany) Uhlsport | (Iran) Resalat Bank' |
| 2012–13 | (Germany) Uhlsport | (Iran) Resalat Bank' |
| 2013–14 | (Iran) Technic | (Iran) Resalat Bank' |

== Season-by-season ==
The table below chronicles the achievements of Mes kerman since 2001.

| Season | Div. | Pos. | Hazfi Cup | Asian Cup |
|---|---|---|---|---|
| 2001–02 | Div 1 | 3rd | did not enter | did not qualify |
| 2002–03 | Div 1 | 14th | did not enter | did not qualify |
| 2003–04 | Div 1 | 13th | did not enter | did not qualify |
| 2004–05 | Div 1 | 5th | did not enter | did not qualify |
| 2005–06 | Div 1 | 1st | did not enter | did not qualify |
| 2006–07 | IPL | 9th | 1/18 Final | did not qualify |
| 2007–08 | IPL | 10th | 1/16 Final | did not qualify |
| 2008–09 | IPL | 3rd | 1/16 Final | did not qualify |
| 2009–10 | IPL | 9th | Quarter Final | Round of 16 |
| 2010–11 | IPL | 7th | 1/16 Final | did not qualify |
| 2011–12 | IPL | 9th | Semi Final | did not qualify |
| 2012–13 | IPL | 6th | 1/16 Final | did not qualify |
| 2013–14 | IPL | 16th | Final | did not qualify |
| 2014–15 | Div 1 | 2nd | 3rd Round | did not qualify |

| Final | Promoted | Relegated |

== Continental record ==
| Season | Competition | Round | Opponent | Home | Away | Aggregate |
|---|---|---|---|---|---|---|
| 2010 | AFC Champions League | Group D | (United Arab Emirates) Al-Ahli | 4–2 | 2–1 | 2nd |
| 2010 | AFC Champions League | Group D | (Saudi Arabia) Al-Hilal | 3–1 | 3–1 | 2nd |
| 2010 | AFC Champions League | Group D | (Qatar) Al-Sadd | 3–1 | 4–1 | 2nd |
| 2010 | AFC Champions League | Round of 16 | (Iran) Zob Ahan | 1–0 | | |

== Honours ==
- Azadegan League:
  - Winners: 2005–06
  - Runners-Up (1): 2021–22
- 2nd Division:
  - Winners (1): 1999–00
  - Runners-Up (1): 1998–99
- Hazfi Cup:
  - Runners-Up (1): 2013–14

== Players ==
As of 18 February 2025

=== First-team squad ===
Note: Flags indicate national team as defined under FIFA eligibility rules; some limited exceptions apply. Players may hold more than one non-FIFA nationality.

| No. | Pos. | Nation | Player |
|---|---|---|---|
| 1 | GK | IRI | Iman Sadeghi |
| 2 | DF | IRI | Mohsen Moazami Goudarzi |
| 4 | MF | IRI | Mehdi Kiani |
| 5 | DF | IRI | Amirhossein Behzadi |
| 6 | DF | IRI | Majid Behrouzi |
| 7 | DF | IRI | Farzad Jafari |
| 8 | FW | IRI | Alireza Rahmati |
| 9 | FW | IRI | Morteza Aghakhan |
| 10 | FW | IRI | Mohammad Ghaseminejad |
| 11 | FW | IRI | Abbas Zeraatkar |
| 13 | GK | IRI | Mir Rasoul Hosseini |
| 14 | FW | IRI | Arman Mehdipour |
| 18 | MF | IRI | Aref Zeynali |
| 19 | FW | IRI | Ali Vaziri Panah |
| 20 | FW | IRI | Amirhossein Baniasad |

| No. | Pos. | Nation | Player |
|---|---|---|---|
| 22 | GK | IRI | Hamidreza Ghasemi |
| 30 | MF | IRI | Vahid Namdari |
| 35 | DF | IRI | Mohammadreza Amirzadeh |
| 40 | DF | IRI | Ali Tahami |
| 44 | DF | IRI | Amirhossein Zangiabadi |
| 69 | MF | IRI | Mohammad Saleh Mohammadi |
| 70 | GK | IRI | Amirhossein Birjandi |
| 77 | FW | IRI | Abolfazl Nazari |
| 79 | FW | IRI | Mohammadali Abadipishe |
| 80 | MF | IRI | Atabak Zarei |
| 81 | MF | IRI | Rasoul Manochehri |
| 86 | MF | IRI | Ahmad Nasiri |
| 88 | DF | IRI | Amirhossein Asgari |

=== Former players ===
For details on former players, see Category:Sanat Mes Kerman F.C. players.

== Club officials ==
=== Managers ===
| Name | Nat | From | To |
|---|---|---|---|
| Bijan Zolfagharnasab | (Iran) | July 2000 | July 2002 |
| Mehdi Mohammadi | (Iran) | July 2002 | Jan 2006 |
| Nader Dastneshan | (Iran) | Jan 2006 | Feb 2007 |
| Farhad Kazemi | (Iran) | Feb 2007 | Jan 2008 |
| Amir Ghalenoei | (Iran) | Jan 2008 | June 2008 |
| Parviz Mazloomi | (Iran) | June 2008 | Nov 2009 |
| Mehdi Mohammadi * | (Iran) | Nov 2009 | Dec 2009 |
| Luka Bonačić | (Croatia) | Dec 2009 | June 2010 |
| Samad Marfavi | (Iran) | July 2010 | Aug 2011 |
| Flemming Serritslev * | (Denmark) | July 2011 | Aug 2011 |
| Miroslav Blažević | (Bosnia and Herzegovina) | Aug 2011 | Feb 2012 |
| Ebrahim Ghasempour | (Iran) | Feb 2012 | Jan 2013 |
| Luka Bonačić | (Croatia) | Jan 2013 | June 2013 |
| Mahmoud Yavari | (Iran) | July 2013 | Sept 2013 |
| Parviz Mazloomi | (Iran) | Sept 2013 | Jan 2014 |
| Luka Bonačić | (Croatia) | Jan 2014 | Nov 2014 |
| Akbar Misaghian | (Iran) | Nov 2014 | June 2015 |
| Vinko Begovic | (Croatia) | June 2015 | June 2016 |
| Mansour Ebrahimzadeh | (Iran) | June 2016 | July 2017 |
| Darko Dražić | (Croatia) | July 2017 | June 2018 |
| Nader Dastneshan | (Iran) | July 2018 | Feb 2019 |
| Farzad Hosseinkhani * | (Iran) | Feb 2019 | Jul 2019 |
| Mojtaba Hosseini | (Iran) | July 2019 | Aug 2020 |
| Reza Mohajeri | (Iran) | Aug 2020 | June 2021 |
| Farhad Kazemi | (Iran) | June 2021 | Present |

- * = Caretaker manager

==== Current Coaching Staff ====
| Position | Name |
|---|---|
| Head coach | (Iran) Akbar Mohammadi Argi |
| Assistant coach | (Iran) Vahid Fazeli (Iran) Iman Alemi |
| Goalkeeping coach | (Iran) Abbas Mohammadi |
| Analyzer | (Iran) Miaad Ghasemzadeh |
| Doctor | (Iran) |
| Team Director | (Iran) Javad Yazdpour |

=== Chairpersons ===
| Chairperson | Tenure |
|---|---|
| (Iran) Mahmoud Mostaghimi | March 1998 – March 2000 |
| (Iran) Abdolreza Tajalli | March 2000 – January 2002 |
| (Iran) Abolhassan Mahdavi | January 2002 – March 2002 |
| (Iran) Akbar Iranmanesh | March 2002 – July 2003 |
| (Iran) Hamid Niknafs | July 2003 – July 2007 |
| (Iran) Abdolreza Borhaninezhad | July 2007 – November 2007 |
| (Iran) Ahmad Asadi | November 2007 – December 2007 |
| (Iran) Fathollah Nejadzamani | December 2007 – August 2011 |
| (Iran) Hamid Haj Esmaeli | August 2011 – September 2011 |
| (Iran) Akbar Iranmanesh | September 2011–Present |
