= League Two =

League Two or League 2 may refer to one of the following association football leagues:

- AFC Champions League Two
- China League Two
- EFL League Two in England
- K League 2, in South Korea
- League 2 (Iran)
- Ligue 2 in France
- Scottish League Two
- Thai League 2
- USL League 2 in the United States
