= Juninho (footballer, born June 1989) =

Brazilian footballer

Personal information
- Full name: Roberto Neves Adam Júnior
- Date of birth: 29 June 1989 (age 37)
- Place of birth: Pelotas, Brazil
- Height: 1.71 m (5 ft 7 in)
- Position: Midfielder

Senior career*
Years	Team	Apps	(Gls)
2008–2010	Montevideo Wanderers	9	(0)
2010–2011	Plaza Colonia	9	(1)
2011	Farroupilha		
2011–2012	Brasil de Pelotas	6	(1)
2013	Foolad	6	(1)
2013	Cerro	4	(0)
2014	Villa Teresa	7	(0)
2014–2015	Ethnikos Achna	13	(1)
2015–	Panegialios		
- * Club domestic league appearances and goals as of 08:17, 28 January 2015 (UTC)

Roberto Neves Adam Júnior (born 29 June 1989), simply known as Juninho is a Brazilian professional footballer who played for Ethnikos Achna in Cyprus.
