= 1992–93 Iran 2nd Division =

Iran Football's 2nd Division
- Season: 1992–93
- Champions: Chooka Anzali
- Promoted: Chooka Anzali; Sepahan
- Relegated: Zagros Gachsaran; Kashti Sazi; Idem Tabriz; Payam Mashhad

The 1992–93 Iran 2nd Division football season was played in one group with ten teams. The top two teams – Chooka Anzali, Sepahan – gained promotion to the Azadegan League.

== Standings ==
Pos	Team	Pld	W	D	L	GF	GA	GD	Pts	Promotion or relegation (Note: Table errors: 116 total wins != 114 total losses and 406 total for != 416 total against)
1	Chooka Anzali	26	13	9	4	35	13	+22	35	Promoted 1993–94 Azadegan League
2	Sepahan	26	12	10	4	31	25	+6	34	Promoted 1993–94 Azadegan League
3	Naft Ghaemshahr	26	12	8	6	36	25	+11	32	
4	Mersad Shiraz	26	10	12	4	36	24	+12	32	
5	Shahrdari Kerman	26	11	9	6	46	32	+14	31	
6	Iranjavan	26	10	10	6	40	29	+11	30	
7	Machine Sazi	26	9	11	6	27	20	+7	29	
8	Esteghlal Gaz Rasht	26	9	9	8	28	21	+7	27	
9	Kheybar Khorramabad	26	8	10	8	20	22	−2	26	
10	Bank Saderat Kermanshah	26	6	11	9	29	36	−7	23	
11	Payam Mashhad	26	6	7	13	22	35	−13	19	Relegated to 3rd Division
12	Idem Tabriz	26	3	12	11	11	32	−21	18	Relegated to 3rd Division
13	Kashti Sazi	26	4	7	15	23	42	−19	15	Relegated to 3rd Division
14	Zagros Gachsaran	26	3	9	14	22	60	−38	15	Relegated to 3rd Division
