= Marijan Pušnik =

Slovenian football player

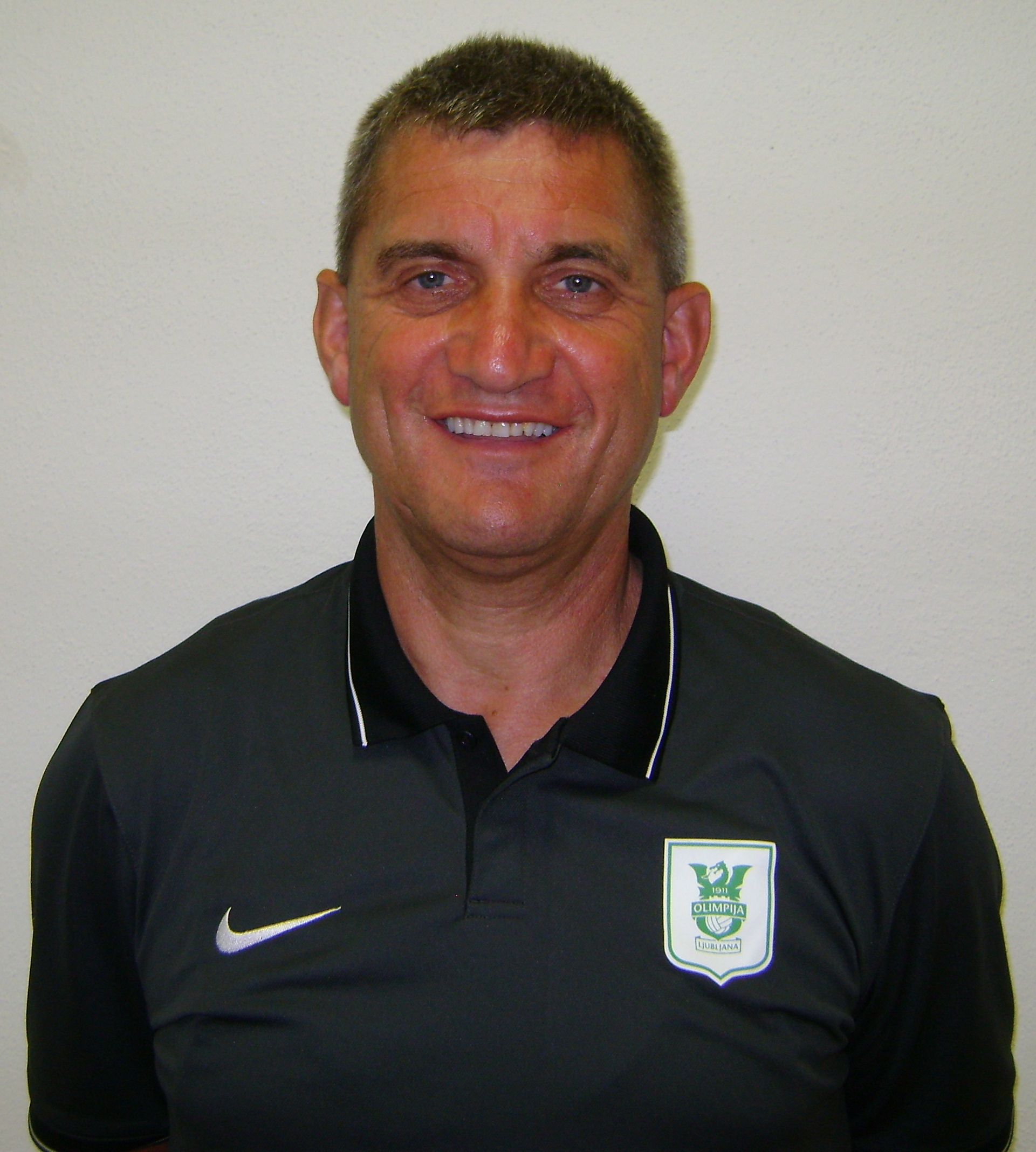
- Pušnik in 2015 with Olimpija Ljubljana

Personal information
- Date of birth: 1 November 1960 (age 65)
- Place of birth: Slovenj Gradec, FPR Yugoslavia

Managerial career
- Years: Team
- 1994–1996: Dravograd
- 1996–1997: Korotan Prevalje
- 1997–1998: SAK Klagenfurt
- 1998–1999: Dravograd
- 2000–2004: Celje
- 2004–2005: Pasargad Tehran
- 2006–2007: Maribor
- 2007–2010: Rudar Velenje
- 2010: Damash Gilan (caretaker)
- 2012: Celje
- 2013–2014: Avispa Fukuoka
- 2015: Olimpija Ljubljana
- 2016: Hajduk Split
- 2017: Olimpija Ljubljana
- 2017–2019: Rudar Velenje

Marijan Pušnik (born 1 November 1960) is a Slovenian football manager.

== Managerial career ==
Pušnik started his managerial career with Dravograd in 1994 but landed his first serious job as Celje manager in 2000. During his four years at Celje, his biggest success was in the 2002–03 season when his team finished second in the 2002–03 Slovenian PrvaLiga and runners-up of the 2002–03 Slovenian Football Cup. After a few years in Iran, he returned to Slovenia and took over Maribor in 2006 with whom he eliminated Villarreal in the 2006 UEFA Intertoto Cup. In 2007, after the arrival of Zlatko Zahovič to the club, Pušnik was sacked. After a few years of working at Rudar Velenje, where he managed to finish third in the league, he went back to Iran.

In June 2015, Pušnik became the manager of Olimpija Ljubljana. After Olimpija finished the first part of the season as the leading team in the league, Pušnik fell into an argument with sporting director Ranko Stojić and was sacked in December 2015. Olimpija went on to win the title that year.

On 2 June 2016, Pušnik was announced as the new manager of Hajduk Split and thus, he became the first Slovenian manager of Hajduk Split in history. He was sacked from Hajduk on 1 December 2016 after dropping out of the 2016–17 Croatian Football Cup quarter-finals.

On 9 March 2017, Pušnik returned to Olimpija Ljubljana, replacing Luka Elsner. He was sacked less than one month later, on 3 April 2017.

On 12 June 2017, Pušnik was announced as the new manager of Rudar Velenje.
