= Markar Aghajanyan =

Iranian footballer and manager

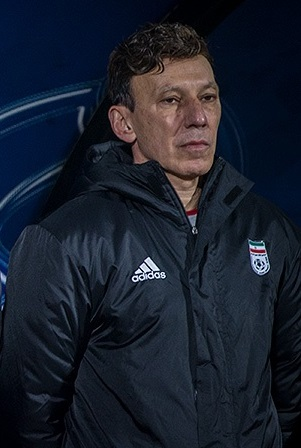

Personal information
- Full name: Markar Aghajanyan
- Date of birth: 4 March 1965 (age 61)
- Place of birth: Tehran, Iran
- Position: Defender

Senior career*
| Years | Team | Apps | (Gls) |
| 1987–1991 | Ararat Tehran | | |
| 1992–1993 | Pas Tehran | | |
| 1993–1996 | Bank Tejarat | | |
| 1996–1997 | Bahman | | |
| 1997–2000 | Shahab Zanjan | | |

International career^{‡}
| 1996–1997 | Iran | 1 | (0) |

Managerial career
- 2009–2010: Damash Gilan
- 2010: Damash Doroud
- 2010–2011: Damash Tehran
- 2011–2012: Iran U-23 (assistant)
- 2011–2019: Iran (assistant)
- 2012: Iran B
- 2022–: Iran (assistant)
- * Club domestic league appearances and goals as of 25 September 2010 ‡ National team caps and goals as of 25 September 2010 (assistant)

Markar Aghajanyan (Armenian: Մարգար Աղաջանեան, Persian: مارکار آقاجانیان; born March 4, 1965) is a retired Iranian football player and manager of Armenian descent.

== Career ==
Aghajanyan spent most of his career playing for Ararat Tehran FC. He later went on to join a series of Tehran-based teams, most notably PAS, where he won the Iran Pro League division in his first season.

With the departure of Human Afazeli, Aghajanyan was appointed the manager of Azadegan League side Damash Lorestan. The team chose not to renew his contract for the 2010–11 season.

Aghajanyan was also a part of the coaching staff for the Iranian national football team, and he was the assistant coach during the 2014, 2018 FIFA World Cups.

== External sources ==
- Markar Aghajanyan at National-Football-Teams.com
