= Akbar Misaghian =

Iranian footballer and manager

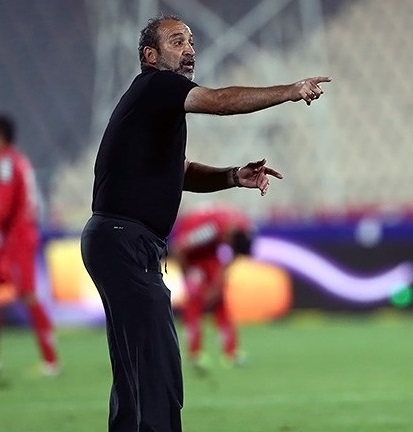

Personal information
- Full name: Akbar Misaghian
- Date of birth: May 21, 1953 (age 73)
- Place of birth: Gonbade Kavous, Iran
- Position: Defender

Senior career*
Years	Team	Apps	(Gls)
1969–1970	Deihim Tehran		
1971–1973	Bootan Tehran		
1973–1976	Aboumoslem		
1976–1978	Malavan		
1979–1982	Esteghlal		
1982–1991	Aboumoslem		

International career
1973	Iran		

Managerial career
- 1995–1999: Aboumoslem Khorasan
- 1999–2002: Payam Khorasan
- 2002–2004: Shamoushak Noshahr
- 2004–2006: Aboumoslem Khorasan
- 2006–2008: Rah Ahan
- 2008–2009: Esteghlal Ahvaz
- 2009–2010: Shahrdari Tabriz
- 2011: Shahin Bushehr
- 2011–2013: Aluminium Hormozgan
- 2013–2014: Padideh Khorasan
- 2014–2015: Mes Kerman
- 2015–2016: Khooneh Be Khooneh
- 2016: Mes Kerman (interim)
- 2016–2017: Baadraan
- 2017: Siah Jamegan Mashhad
- 2018: Arvand Khuzestan
- 2018–2019: Khooneh Be Khooneh
- 2020: Malavan
- 2020–21: Vista Toorbin
- 2021: Khooshe Talei(Technical manager)
- 2021: Shahr Khodro Mashhad
- 2022–2023: Damash Gilan
- 2023–2024: Shahrdari Noshahr
- 2024–2025: Sepidrood Rasht
- 2025: Ferdowsi Samen
- * Club domestic league appearances and goals

Akbar Misaghian (Persian: اکبر میثاقیان, born May 21, 1953) is an Iranian retired football player and coach. After retirement, he managed several Iranian clubs, most notably F.C. Aboumoslem.

== Playing career ==
=== Club career ===
He started his playing career in 1971 when he played for Bootan Tehran while working for Bootan Gas Company. He then moved to Mashhad and played for Aboumoslem. In 1976, he left Mashhad for Bandar Anzali to play for Malavan for two seasons. Then he played for Esteghlal for three seasons and finally in 1982 he returned to Mashhad and started playing for Aboumoslem once again.

=== International career ===
In 1973 Misaghian was called up to the Iran national football team selection camp, however failed to impress enough to maintain a place in the squad.

=== Personal life ===
Akbar Misaghian is the father of Mes Kerman player Behtash Misaghian.

== Honours ==
=== Manager ===
Aboumoslem Khorasan

- 2nd Division (1): 1997–98
- Hazfi Cup (1): 2004–05 (Runner-up)

Payam Khorasan

- 2nd Division (1): 2000–01

Shamoushak

- Azadegan League (1): 2002–03

Shahrdari Tabriz

- Azadegan League (1): 2009–10

Aluminium Hormozgan

- Azadegan League (1): 2011–12

Padideh Khorasan

- Azadegan League (1): 2013–14

Mes Kerman

- Azadegan League (1): 2014–15 (Runners-up / Promoted of second Playoffs)

Shahrdari Noshahr

- Iran Football's 2nd Division (1): 2023–24 (Runners-up / Promotion with Playoff)
