= Omid Harandi =

Iranian footballer and coach (born 1964)

Personal information
- Full name: Omid Harandi
- Date of birth: March 14, 1964 (age 62)
- Place of birth: Rasht, Iran
- Position: Goalkeeper

Youth career
- 1980–1982: Naft Gilan

Senior career*
Years	Team	Apps	(Gls)
1982–1987	Sepidrood		
1987–1998	Esteghlal Rasht		
1998–2000	Niroye Zamini		

International career
1983–1988	Iran U-23	30	(0)

Managerial career
- 2001–2008: Pegah (Assistant)
- 2012: Damash Gilan
- 2014–2015: Damash Gilan
- * Club domestic league appearances and goals

Omid Harandi (Persian: امید هرندی; born 14 March 1964 in Rasht, Iran) is an Iranian football coach and retired player who recently managed Damash Gilan in Iran Pro League. He was previously assistant coach of Pegah Gilan for six years.

== Playing career ==
He began his career as a football goalkeeper in 1980 with Naft Gilan. After two years, he joined to Sepidrood Rasht and played for the team for five years, then moved to Esteghlal Rasht and played eleven seasons in the club. He signed a two years contract with Niroye Zamini and retired at the end of his contract.

== Managerial career ==
He was chosen as Esteghlal Rasht (then Pegah Gilan)'s assistant coach in 2001, one year after his retirement. He started his career with Nasser Hejazi and remained in the coaching staff of next coaches. He resigned in 2008. Four years after his resignation, he was appointed as Damash Gilan's head coach for the upcoming season and signed a one-year contract after talks with club president, Amir Abedini but he was fired after a 6-1 loss to Fajr Sepasi on 16 September 2012.

=== Managerial statistics ===
As of 15 September 2012

Team	From	To	Record							
Team	From	To	G	W	D	L	Win %	GF	GA	+/-
Damash	June 2012	September 2012	8	2	3	3	25.00	8	13	–5
Total			8	2	3	3	25.00	8	13	–5
