= Hamid Derakhshan =

Iranian footballer and manager (born 1959)

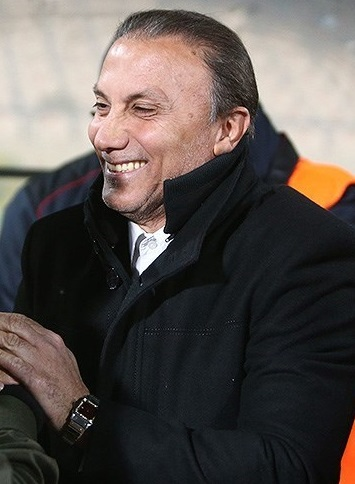

Personal information
- Full name: Hamid Reza Derakhshan
- Date of birth: 23 January 1959 (age 67)
- Place of birth: Tehran, Iran
- Height: 1.75 m (5 ft 9 in)
- Position: Midfielder

Youth career
- 1975–1977: Mazda

Senior career*
Years	Team	Apps	(Gls)
1977–1987	Persepolis	206	(58)
1987–1991	Qatar SC	73	(16)
1991–1992	Al-Sadd	15	(3)
1992–1994	Persepolis	39	(10)
Total		333	(87)

International career
1976–1977	Iran U-20	8	(?)
1980–1993	Iran	41	(9)

Managerial career
- 1994–1995: Persepolis
- 1997: Persepolis
- 2001–2002: Iran U-17
- 2004: Sorkhpooshan
- 2004: Homa
- 2009–2010: Paykan
- 2010–2011: Shahrdari Tabriz
- 2011–2012: Shahin Bushehr
- 2012–2013: Damash Gilan
- 2014–2015: Persepolis
- 2016: Khoneh Be Khoneh
- 2017: Naft Tehran
- 2021: Naft Masjed Soleyman
- 2022: Saipa
- * Club domestic league appearances and goals

Hamid Reza Derakhshan (Persian: حمید درخشان; born 23 January 1959) is an Iranian former professional football player and now manager who last managed Saipa in Azadegan League.

Derakhshan played as a midfielder for a number of clubs, most notably Persepolis, as well as the Iran national team. He played a total of twelve years at Persepolis and for five years at Qatar SC and Al-Sadd. After his retirement as a player, he became manager of Persepolis, managing the team from 1994 to 1995 and in 1997. He later managed other Iranian clubs like Rah Ahan, Paykan, Shahrdari Tabriz, Shahin Bushehr and Damash Gilan. In September 2014, he returned as manager of Persepolis, after he served as club's technical manager.

== Club career ==
Born in Tehran, Iran, Derakhshan started his club career with Persepolis. After playing ten years for Persepolis, he left the club for Qatar where he joined Qatar SC for which he played for four years followed by one season in Al-Sadd. Although he played for Persepolis on loan during 1990 Asian Cup Winners' Cup when Persepolis won the title. He returned to Persepolis and played his last two years at Persepolis before retiring in 1994.

== International career ==
Derakhshan was a member of the Iran national under-20 football team at 1977 FIFA World Youth Championship. He played for Iran national team at 1980 AFC Asian Cup, 1982 Asian Games, 1984 AFC Asian Cup, 1986 Asian Games. He was captain of Iran at ECO Cup in 1993 and 1994 FIFA World Cup Qualifications.

=== International goals ===
Scores and results list Iran's goal tally first, score column indicates score after each Derakhshan goal.

List of international goals scored by Hamid Derakhshan
No.	Date	Venue	Opponent	Score	Result	Competition
1	5 August 1980	Dubai, United Arab Emirates	United Arab Emirates		2–0	
2	29 September 1980	Kuwait City, Kuwait	North Korea		3–0	
3	15 August 1984	Jakarta, Indonesia	Philippines		7–1	
4	13 December 1984	Singapore, Singapore	Saudi Arabia		1–1	
5	20 February 1986	Tehran, Iran	Ghana		2–0	
6	27 September 1991	Tehran, Iran	Algeria		2–1	
7	6 July 1993	Tehran, Iran	Syria		1–1	
8	18 October 1993	Doha, Qatar	Japan		2–1	
9	22 October 1993	Doha, Qatar	Iraq		1–2	

== Coaching career ==
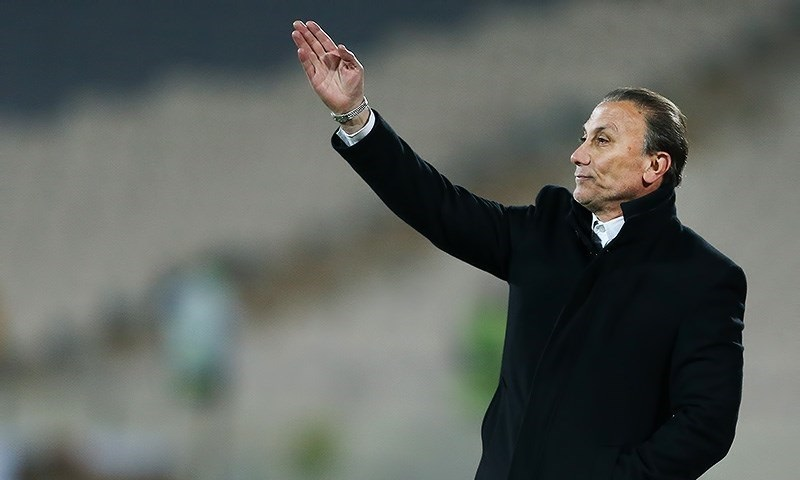
Derakhshan coaching Persepolis during AFC Champions League match against Lekhwiya

Derakhshan started his coaching career as coach of Persepolis in 1995. He also coached Iran U20 national team in 2001 but was sacked after it was discovered that he had been using overage players in his teams. He also briefly acted as an assistant coach to Branko Ivankovic in 2002.

He was the technical manager of Persepolis from 2004 until 2008 and Paykan in 2008–09 season. He became the head coach of Paykan in summer 2009. He was appointed as Shahrdari Tabriz's head coach on 10 October 2010 and was sacked by club on 19 June 2011. He was appointed as Shahin Bushehr's head coach on 26 June 2011. He resigned on 5 October 2011 but was re-signed by Shahin on 13 February 2012. He resigned again after a series of the problem in the club that led team in the relegation zone and losing 2012 Hazfi Cup Final. On 21 September 2012, he was signed as new head coach of Damash Gilan but was sacked on 3 March 2013 after a series of poor results.

On 10 September 2014, Derakhshan became manager of Persepolis, replacing sacked Ali Daei. However, he resigned on 5 April 2015 after a poor run of results.

As of 25 August 2017

Team	From	To	Record							
Team	From	To	G	W	D	L	Win %	GF	GA	+/-
Persepolis	July 1994	January 1995	33	16	10	7	48.48%	104	68	+36
Iran U17	March 2000	January 2001	13	9	0	4	69.23%	41	10	+31
Paykan	July 2009	July 2010	35	9	15	11	25.71%	41	45	–4
Shahrdari Tabriz	October 2010	July 2011	34	8	13	13	23.52%	45	53	–8
Shahin Bushehr	July 2011	October 2011	9	2	4	3	22.22%	9	6	+3
Shahin Bushehr	February 2012	April 2012	4	0	3	1	00.00%	1	2	–1
Damash Gilan	September 2012	March 2013	22	6	9	7	27.27%	23	24	–1
Persepolis	September 2014	April 2015	24	8	7	9	33.33%	27	26	+1
Khoneh Be Khoneh	March 2016	April 2016	5	0	4	1	00.00%	3	3	0
Naft Tehran	July 2017	December 2017	16	3	4	9	18.75%	9	22	–13
Total			182	59	65	58	33.33%	299	248	+51

== Honours ==
=== As a player ===
Persepolis

- Tehran Provincial League: 1983, 1985, 1987
- Asian Cup Winners' Cup: 1990

Iran

- AFC Asian Cup: third place 1980, fourth place 1984
- ECO Cup: 1993

=== As a manager ===
Shahin Bushehr

- Hazfi Cup: runner-up 2011–12
