= Ebrahim Ghasempour =

Iranian footballer and coach

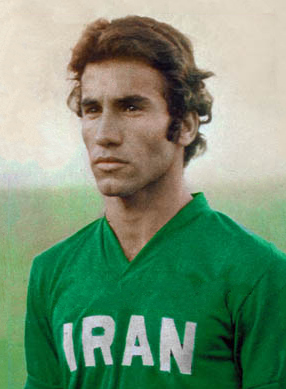
- Ghasempour in 1976

Personal information
- Full name: Ebrahim Ghasempour
- Date of birth: 11 September 1957 (age 69)
- Place of birth: Abadan, Iran
- Height: 1.70 m (5 ft 7 in)
- Position: Midfielder

Youth career
- 1972–1974: Sanat Naft

Senior career*
Years	Team	Apps	(Gls)
1974–1976	Sanat Naft		
1976–1978	Shahbaz		
1978–1979	Pas		
1979–1980	Emirates Club		
1980–1982	Al-Nasr		
1982–1983	Al-Arabi		
1983–1985	Al-Masry		
1985–1988	Al-Rayyan		
1988–1990	Al-Sadd		
1992–1994	Al-Masry		
1994–1996	Pas		
- Al-Arabi

International career
1975–1978	Iran	31	(1)

Managerial career
- 1994–1995: Pas
- 1996–1997: Pas B
- 1997: Pas
- 1997–1999: Iran-U23
- 1999–2000: Pas
- 2001–2002: Sanat Naft
- 2002: Bargh Shiraz
- 2006–2007: Hatta
- 2007–2008: Sanat Naft
- 2008: Homa
- 2008: Hatta
- 2008–2009: Emirates
- 2011–2012: Damash Gilan
- 2012–2013: Mes Kerman
- 2013–2014: Sanat Naft
- * Club domestic league appearances and goals

Ebrahim Ghasempour (Persian: ابراهیم قاسمپور; born 11 September 1957) is an Iranian association football coach and retired player who in 2013 managed Sanat Naft in Azadegan League.

== Early life ==
Ghasempour was born on 11 September 1957 in Abadan, Iran and began his career by playing in the youth team of Sanat Naft in 1972. He joined the senior team in 1974 after winning the 1974 AFC Youth Championship.

== Playing career ==
After playing for Sanat Naft for three years, he left the club in 1976 and joined Shahbaz reaching the third place in the Iranian league in 1976–77 with that club as one of the key players. He signed a two-year contract with Pas in 1978. He played for different clubs in Iranian, Emirati, Qatari and Egyptian leagues for 16 years. He returned to Pas in 1994 and retired in 1996.

== International career ==
Ghasempour was invited to the Iran national football team and made 31 appearances for the Iran national football team from 1975 to 1978 and was a participant at the 1978 FIFA World Cup. He was a member of the Iranian team winning the Asia Cup 1976 in Tehran, and reached the quarterfinals of the Olympic Tournament in Montreal in 1976.

== Coaching career ==
In 1994, Ghasempour returned to Pas as a player-manager and managed the team until 1995. After he retired from playing, he was appointed as the head coach of B team of Pas club and was selected again as the manager of Pas in 1997 but resigned after six months to become the manager of Iran national under-23 football team. He was sacked in 1999. Two months after, he returned again as the head coach of Pas. He was appointed as the manager of Sanat Naft in July 2001 and was managing the team until February 2002. Bargh Shiraz signed a contract with Ghasempour in February 2002 and he stayed there till December 2002. He became the head coach of United Arab Emirates club, Hatta Club, in January 2006. He resigned in April 2007 and was appointed as the head coach of Sanat Naft in July 2007. After bad results, Ghasempour was sacked in March 2008. In June 2008, he was appointed as the head coach of Homa and resigned the same year. He returned to Hatta in November 2008 but resigned and became the head coach of Emirates Club. He left the club over disagreements with the club's chairman. He was appointed as the head coach of Iran Pro League side Damash Gilan on 20 September 2011 replaced Mehdi Dinvarzadeh but he resigned on 31 December 2011 after just five months in charge. He was appointed as Mes Kerman's new head coach on 15 February 2012, signing a contract until the end of season. He began his career in Mes with a 1–1 draw with Persepolis. After some good results with the team that saved the club from relegation, his contract was extended for one more season but he was sacked on 27 December 2012. He was named as newly relegated Sanat Naft on 12 June 2013. After his failure in promoting back the team to the first division, he was sacked by the club.

=== Statistics ===
As of 1 March 2014

Team	From	To	Record						
Team	From	To	G	W	D	L	GF	GA	+/-
Pas	June 1994	June 1995	22	6	13	3	32	22	+10
Pas	January 1997	June 1997	10	6	2	2	10	10	0
Iran U-23	June 1997	June 1999	23	13	7	3	37	22	+15
Pas	November 1999	May 2000	14	6	2	6	15	11	+4
Sanat Naft	July 2001	February 2002	8	1	4	3	9	10	−1
Bargh Shiraz	February 2002	December 2002	26	9	5	12	28	37	−9
Hatta	January 2006	April 2007	26	25	1	0	25	10	+15
Sanat Naft	July 2007	March 2008	30	8	8	14	30	37	−7
Hatta	November 2008	December 2008	5	2	1	2	6	4	+2
Emirates	November 2008	March 2009							
Damash	September 2011	January 2012	10	5	3	2	18	11	+7
Mes Kerman	February 2012	January 2013	28	11	10	7	26	21	+5
Sanat Naft	June 2013	June 2014	25	11	7	7	25	21	+4

== Personal life ==
On 26 February 2026, in light of the 2025–2026 Iranian protests, Ghasempour commented on the national team's silence on the protests, stating: "Many people are not happy with the national team. Many people are not happy with the national team and do not wish the players success."
