= Esteghlal Rasht F.C. =

Iranian football club based in Rasht

Esteghlal Rasht
- Full name: Esteghlal Shahrdari Rasht Football Club
- Nickname: The Blues (آبی‌ پوشان)
- Ground: Dr. Azodi Stadium
- Capacity: 11,000
- Owner: Municipality of Rasht
- League: Gilan Province League
- Website: http://esteghlalrasht.ir/
Home colours	Away colours

Esteghlal Shahrdari Rasht Football Club (Persian: استقلال رشت) commonly known as Esteghlal Rasht, is a football club, based in Rasht, Gilan, Iran. The club was founded in 1983. First dissolved in 2002, the club was refounded later. The club plays currently in the Gilan Province League.

== History ==
=== Establishment ===
The club was known as Esteghlal Gaz Rasht in 1992–93 Iran Football's 2nd Division due to sponsorship. After playing many years in Iran Football's 2nd Division, they were promoted to Azadegan League in 2000. They finished 10th in 2000–01 season. But only one year later they were relegated again. They finished 13th in that season.

=== Dissolution ===
Due to financial problems and relegation, Esteghlal Rasht sold their licence to Pegah Dairy Company. The new club was named as Pegah Gilan. Many players and their coach Majid Jahanpour moved to Pegah Gilan. On 5 August 2002, Esteghlal Rasht was officially dissolvedand it is known as Damashguilan sc

=== Refounding ===
However Esteghlal Rasht was refounded years later and able to play in Gilan Province League.

== Stadium ==
Dr. Azodi Stadium is the home stadium of Esteghlal Rasht since 1990. It has a current capacity of 11,000 spectators. The stadium is named after Dr. Hassan Azodi who was killed on June 28, 1981, in an explosion at the central office of the Islamic Republican Party. It is also the home venue of local rivals Damash and Sepidrood.

== Seasons ==
The table below chronicles the achievements of Esteghlal Rasht in various competitions since 1990.

Season	Div.	League	Position	Hazfi Cup	Notes
1990–91	2	2nd Division	2nd/Group 1		Promoted to Azadegan League
1991–92	1	Azadegan League	11th		Relegated to 2nd Division
1992–93	2	2nd Division	8th		Esteghlal Gaz Rasht
1995–96	2	2nd Division	7th/Group 1		
1997–98	2	2nd Division	1st/Group 2		Promoted 2nd Round
1998–99	2	2nd Division	2nd/Group 2		Promoted 2nd Round
1999–00	2	2nd Division	2nd/Group 1		Promoted to Azadegan League
2000–01	1	Azadegan League	10th		
2001–02	1	Pro League	13th		Relegated to Azadegan League

== Club managers ==
- Majid Jahanpour (1990)
- Farhad Kazemi (2000)
- Majid Jahanpour (2000–2001)
- Nasser Hejazi (2001–2002)
- Majid Jahanpour (2002)
