= 2005–06 Azadegan League =

15th season of Azadegan League

Azadegan League
- Season: 2005–06
- Champions: Mes Kerman
- Promoted: Mes Kerman; Paykan
- Relegated: Iranjavan; Bargh Tehran; Shahrdari Langarud; Deihim Ahvaz

The 2005–06 Azadegan League was the 15th season of the League and fifth as the second highest division since its establishment in 1991.

Following are the standings for the 2005–06 season in the Azadegan League.

== Standings ==
=== Group A ===
Pos	Team	Pld	W	D	L	GF	GA	GD	Pts	Qualification or relegation
1	Pegah	22	15	3	4	42	12	+30	48	Promoted Second Round
2	Tractor Sazi	22	14	5	3	33	16	+17	47	Second place playoff
3	Homa	22	14	5	3	30	16	+14	47	Second place playoff
4	Oghab	22	8	8	6	28	26	+2	32	
5	Sanaye Arak	22	8	5	9	30	34	−4	29	
6	Keshto Sannat	22	7	7	8	29	32	−3	28	
7	Niroye Zamini	22	6	8	8	25	30	−5	26	
8	Shahab Zanjan	22	7	4	11	25	32	−7	25	
9	Deyhim Ahvaz	22	6	6	10	28	31	−3	24	
10	Ekbatan	22	4	9	9	20	28	−8	21	Relegation playoff
11	Nozhan	22	4	8	10	12	22	−10	20	Relegation playoff
12	Iranjavan	22	3	4	15	19	44	−25	13	Relegation to 2006-07 Iran Football's 2nd Division

Updated to match(es) played on 11 May 2006. Source:
Rules for classification: 1) points; 2) goal difference; 3) number of goals scored.

=== Group B ===
Pos	Team	Pld	W	D	L	GF	GA	GD	Pts	Qualification or relegation
1	Mes Kerman	22	12	7	3	30	13	+17	43	Promoted Second Round
2	Paykan	22	11	7	4	28	11	+17	40	Promoted Second Round
3	Sanat Naft	22	11	5	6	27	14	+13	38	
4	Shahin Bushehr	22	11	2	9	30	28	+2	35	
5	Moghavemat Mersad	22	10	4	8	28	25	+3	34	
6	Sorkhpooshan	22	8	7	7	27	24	+3	31	
7	Pegah Shush	22	5	12	5	24	21	+3	27	
8	Est. Kish	22	7	4	11	25	32	−7	25	
9	Machine Sazi	22	6	7	9	21	36	−15	25	
10	Payam Mashhad	22	6	6	10	21	30	−9	24	
11	Bargh Tehran	22	5	6	11	19	25	−6	21	Relegation to 2006-07 Iran Football's 2nd Division
12	Sh. Langarud	22	2	6	14	17	39	−22	12	Relegation to 2006-07 Iran Football's 2nd Division

Updated to match(es) played on 11 May 2006. Source:
Rules for classification: 1) points; 2) goal difference; 3) number of goals scored.

== Second place playoff ==
June 1, Naghsh-e-Jahan Stadium, Isfahan

Team 1	Score	Team 2
Homa	0–0; 5–4 (p)	Tractor Sazi

Homa In Promotion playoffs.

== Second round ==
First leg to be played May 26, 2006 in Iran Khodro Stadium; return leg to be played June 2, 2006 in Azodi Stadium.

Team 1	Agg.	Team 2	1st leg	2nd leg
Paykan	3–2	Pegah	2–1	1–1

(P) Paykan Promoted  to 2006–07 Persian Gulf Cup.

First leg to be played June 2, 2006 in Kiyani Stadium; return leg to be played June 11, 2006 in Homa Stadium

Team 1	Agg.	Team 2	1st leg	2nd leg
Mes Kerman	4–2	Homa	3–1	1–1

(P) Mes Kerman Promoted  to 2006–07 Persian Gulf Cup.[1]

=== Final ===
First leg to be played June 18, 2006 in Kiyani Stadium

Team 1	Agg.	Team 2	1st leg	2nd leg
Mes Kerman	(w/o)^{1}	Paykan		

^{1} Scheduled for June 18, Kerman between Mes Kerman and Paykan Tehran, however, Paykan did not show up, Mes Kerman awarded championship.

== Relegation playoff ==
May 21, Naghsh-e-Jahan Stadium, Isfahan

Team 1	Score	Team 2
Ekbatan	0–0; 3–2 (p)	Deihim Ahvaz

(R) Deihim Ahvaz Relegated to 2nd Division.

== Top goal scorers ==
14

- (Iran) Hossein Abdi (Sanaye Arak)

13

- (Iran) Babak Hatami (Mes)

== Final results ==
- Azadegan League champions : Mes Kerman
- Relegated : Bargh Tehran, Deihim Ahvaz, Iranjavan Bushehr, Shahrdari Langrud
- Promoted : Mes Kerman, Paykan
- Top goal scorers: Hossein Abadi (Sanaye Arak) 15 Goals (Group A) & Babak Hatami (Mes Kerman) 13 Goals (Group B)
