= 2001–02 Iran Pro League =

Persian Gulf football season

Iran Pro League
- Season: 2001–02
- Champions: Persepolis
- Relegated: Est. Rasht; Tractor Sazi
- 2002–03 AFC Champions League: Persepolis; Esteghlal
- Matches: 182
- Goals: 382 (2.1 per match)
- Top goalscorer: Reza Enayati (17 goals)
- Biggest home win: Aboomoslem 9–2 Esteghlal Rasht
- Biggest away win: Tractor 0–3 Foolad; Tractor 0–3 Bargh Shiraz
- Highest scoring: Aboomoslem 9–2 Esteghlal Rasht
- Longest winning run: Esteghlal (6 matches)
- Longest unbeaten run: PAS (12 matches)
- Longest winless run: Esteghlal Rasht (12 matches)
- Longest losing run: Esteghlal Rasht, Fajr Sepasi (4 matches)

The following is the standings of the Persian Gulf Cup's 2001–02 football season. This was the first season of the Iran Pro League (Persian Gulf Cup) and replaced the Azadegan League as top tier of men's professional football division in the Iranian football league system. Persepolis became the first team to win the title under the management of Ali Parvin.

== Teams ==
Team	Location	Stadium	Capacity
Aboomoslem	Mashhad	Takhti Stadium	15,000
Bargh Shiraz	Shiraz	Hafezieh Stadium	20,000
Esteghlal	Tehran	Azadi Stadium	100,000
Esteghlal Rasht	Rasht	Dr. Azodi Stadium	15,000
Fajr Sepasi	Shiraz	Hafezieh Stadium	20,000
Foolad	Ahvaz	Takhti Stadium	30,000
Malavan	Anzali	Sirous Ghayeghran Stadium	15,559
PAS	Tehran	Shahid Dastgerdi Stadium	8,250
Paykan	Tehran	Iran Khodro Stadium	10,000
Persepolis	Tehran	Azadi Stadium	100,000
Saipa	Tehran	Shahid Shiroudi Stadium	25,000
Sepahan	Isfahan	Naghsh-e Jahan Stadium	75,000
Tractor	Tabriz	Yadegar-e Emam Stadium	70,000
Zob Ahan	Isfahan	Foolad Shahr Stadium	20,000

== Final classification ==
Pos	Team	Pld	W	D	L	GF	GA	GD	Pts	Qualification or relegation
1	Persepolis (C)	26	13	10	3	36	23	+13	49	Qualification for the 2002–03 AFC Champions League group stage
2	Esteghlal	26	13	9	4	38	21	+17	48	Qualification for the 2002–03 AFC Champions League qualification
3	Foolad	26	12	9	5	32	23	+9	45	
4	Pas	26	10	13	3	39	24	+15	43	
5	Aboumoslem	26	11	7	8	40	31	+9	40	
6	Zob Ahan	26	10	9	7	35	30	+5	39	
7	Paykan	26	11	5	10	28	22	+6	38	
8	Bargh	26	9	10	7	28	25	+3	37	
9	Sepahan	26	7	11	8	22	22	0	32	
10	Fajr	26	6	9	11	15	20	−5	27	
11	Saipa	26	6	9	11	24	30	−6	27	
12	Malavan	26	6	9	11	20	36	−16	27	
13	Est. Rasht (R)	26	3	7	16	18	44	−26	16	Relegation to the 2002–03 Azadegan League
14	Tractor Sazi (R)	26	2	9	15	12	36	−24	15	Relegation to the 2002–03 Azadegan League

Updated to match(es) played on 1 Sep 2018. Source: IPL Stats, Soccerway
Rules for classification: 1) Points; 2) Goal difference; 3) Goals scored.
(C) Champions; (R) Relegated

== Results table ==
Home \ Away	PRS	EST	FOL	PAS	ABU	ZOB	PAY	BGH	SEP	FJR	SAP	MLV	ESR	TRK
Persepolis		0–0	1–1	1–3	3–2	3–0	1–0	0–1	3–2	1–0	1–1	2–1	2–1	2–1
Esteghlal	1–1		0–0	1–3	2–1	2–2	1–0	1–0	3–0	1–1	2–2	4–0	3–2	4–0
Foolad	1–2	1–2		1–2	1–0	0–0	1–0	3–2	1–1	1–0	1–0	1–0	2–1	2–0
PAS Tehran	0–0	2–1	3–3		1–1	1–1	4–1	1–1	0–0	1–2	4–3	5–0	2–0	0–0
Aboumoslem	1–1	1–1	2–0	1–1		0–1	3–1	1–0	4–3	1–0	0–3	1–0	9–2	2–1
Zob Ahan	1–1	2–1	1–1	0–0	1–2		0–1	0–0	0–2	2–0	0–0	4–1	1–0	1–0
Paykan	1–2	1–3	1–2	0–0	0–0	3–1		3–0	0–0	2–1	1–0	3–0	4–0	0–0
Bargh Shiraz	0–0	1–1	1–1	3–0	2–2	1–3	0–0		0–0	0–1	2–0	2–0	2–0	1–0
Sepahan	0–0	0–1	2–2	1–3	1–0	2–0	1–0	3–0		0–0	0–0	0–1	1–0	0–1
Fajr Sepasi	1–0	0–0	1–1	1–0	2–0	0–2	0–2	0–0	0–1		1–1	0–1	3–0	1–1
Saipa	2–4	0–1	1–0	0–1	0–1	2–1	0–1	2–3	2–0	1–0		1–1	2–0	2–0
Malavan	1–1	1–0	0–1	0–0	1–1	1–3	0–1	1–1	0–0	1–0	1–1		1–1	3–0
Est. Rasht	1–3	0–1	0–1	1–1	2–0	1–1	1–0	1–2	1–1	0–0	0–0	1–2		2–0
Tractor Sazi	0–1	0–1	0–3	1–1	4–1	0–2	1–2	0–3	0–0	0–0	0–0	2–2	0–0	

Source: http://www.iplstats.com/
Legend: Blue = home team win; Yellow = draw; Red = away team win.

== Top goal scorers ==
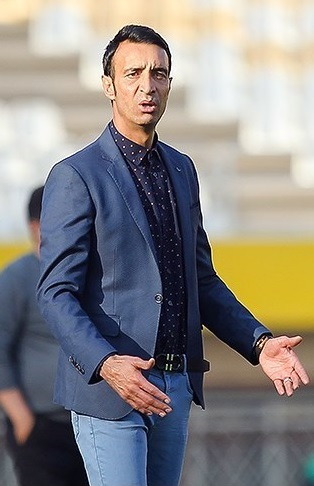
Reza Enayati

17

- (Iran) Reza Enayati (Aboomoslem)

11

- (Iran) Ali Asghar Modirroosta (Paykan)

9

- (Iran) Sohrab Entezari (Persepolis)
- (Iran) Behnam Seraj (Foolad)

8

- (Iran) Khodadad Azizi (PAS Tehran)
- (Iran) Sirous Dinmohammadi (Esteghlal)
- (Iran) Rasoul Khatibi (PAS Tehran)
- (Iran) Reza Ostovari (Paykan)
- (Iran) Mohammad Mansouri (Bargh Shiraz)

== Participating in international competitions ==
2001–02 Asian Club Championship

- Esteghlal

2001–02 Asian Cup Winners' Cup

- Fajr Sepasi
