= Mehdi Dinvarzadeh =

Iranian footballer and manager

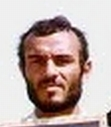

Personal information
- Full name: Mehdi Dinvarzadeh
- Date of birth: March 12, 1955 (age 71)
- Place of birth: Tehran, Iran
- Position: Defender

Team information
- Current team: Foolad Yazd (manager)

Senior career*
Years	Team	Apps	(Gls)
1970–1972	Shahbaz		
1972–1976	Pas Tehran		
1976–1986	Shahin		

International career
1977–1984	Iran	32	(0)

Managerial career
- 1990–1995: Mehr Shemiran
- 1995–1996: Payam Mashhad
- 1996–1997: Aboomoslem
- 2006–2007: Bargh Tehran
- 2007–2010: Naft
- 2010: Bargh Shiraz
- 2010–2011: Damash Gilan
- 2011–2013: Foolad Yazd
- 2013: Shahrdari Ardabil
- * Club domestic league appearances and goals

Mehdi Dinvarzadeh (Persian: مهدی دینورزاده) is a retired Iranian footballer and football coach. He was the captain of the Iran national football team and Shahin F.C. during the 1980s. He is currently head coach of Shahrdari Ardabil in Azadegan League.

== Playing career ==
=== Club careers ===
He began his playing for the Shahbaz F.C. in 1970. In 1972, he joined to the Pas Tehran F.C. His golden ages was in Pas but after Pas's bad results in 1976, he leaves Pas and enjoyed to Shahin F.C. and was retired from playing in 1986.

=== International careers ===
He was invited to the Iran national football team in 1977 by Heshmat Mohajerani. He retired after a match against Turkey in 1984.

== Managerial career ==
He began coaching in Mehr Shemiran in 1990. In 1985, he becomes head coach of Payam Mashhad but less than one year, he was sacked by club. Later, he was appointed as head coach of Aboomoslem and had a good results with Aboomoslem. After near one decade, he return to the football and becomes head coach of Bargh Tehran but was resigned in June 2007. In July 2007, he becomes head coach of Naft Tehran and help club to promoted to the Iran Pro League. From May to June 2010, he was caretaker head coach of Bargh Shiraz. On 1 June 2010, he was appointed as head coach of Damash Gilan and promoted to the Iran Pro League with Damash and was lead Damash in 2011–12 Persian Gulf Cup until week 8. He was resigned on 18 September 2011.

=== Statistics ===
Team	From	To	Record						
Team	From	To	G	W	D	L	GF	GA	+/-
Naft Tehran	July 2007	May 2010	42	25	12	5	69	30	+39
Damash Gilan	June 2010	September 2011	33	14	11	8	43	35	+8
Total			75	39	23	13	112	65	+48

== Achievements ==
=== Player ===
Iran national football team

- Asian Cup (third place): 1980

=== Manager ===
Naft Tehran

- Azadegan League: 2009–10
- 2nd Division: 2008–09

Damash Gilan

- Azadegan League: 2010–11

Shahrdari Ardabil

- 2nd Division: 2013–14
