= List of Malavan F.C. seasons =

This is a list of seasons played by Malavan Football Club in Iranian and Asian football, from 1973 to the most recent completed season. It details the club's achievements in major competitions, and the top scorers for each season. Top scorers in bold were also the top scorers in the Iranian league that season.

== Seasons ==
Season	League									Hazfi Cup	Asia	Leagues Top goalscorer		Manager
Season	Division	P	W	D	L	F	A	Pts	Pos	Hazfi Cup	Asia	Name	Goals	Manager
1972-73	Div 2	3	2	1	0	10	2	5	1st	**Not held**				Salehnia
1973-74	TJC	22	10	4	8	27	23	24	5th	**Not held**		**Ghafour Jahani**		Salehnia
1974-75	TJC	22	8	7	7	31	24	23	6th	**Not held**		**Aziz Espandar**	**10**	Salehnia
1975-76	TJC	30	11	1	11	39	32	30	7th	**Champions**		**Ali Niakani**	11	Salehnia
1976-77	TJC	30	10	13	7	25	21	33	7th			**Ghafour Jahani**	9	Salehnia
1977-78	TJC	30	13	11	6	35	22	37	3rd	**Not held**		**Aziz Espandar**	**16**	Salehnia
1978-79	TJC	**Not Completed Due to Iranian Revolution**								**Not held**				Salehnia
1981-82	GL	4	3	1	0	6	0	7	**1st**	**Not held**		**Ghafour Jahani**	4	Salehnia
1982-83	GL	6	2	3	1	6	3	7	**2nd**	**Not held**		**Ghafour Jahani**		Salehnia
1983-84	GL	9	8	1	0	28	4	17	**1st**	**Not held**		**Ghafour Jahani**	**11**	Salehnia
1984-85	GL	14	12	2	0	43	5	26	**1st**	**Not held**		**Ghafour Jahani**	**15**	Salehnia
1985-86	GL	18	10	5	3	38	8	25	**2nd**	**Not held**				Salehnia
1986-87	GL	18	12	5	1	40	5	29	**1st**	**Champions**	ACL 2nd Round	**Mohammad Ahmadzadeh**	**17**	Salehnia
1987-88	GL	22	13	7	2	33	20	33	**2nd**	Final		**Mohammad Ahmadzadeh**	**10**	Salehnia
1988-89	GL	18	11	6	1	36	8	28	**1st**	Final		**Mohammad Ahmadzadeh**		Salehnia
1989-90	QL	20	10	8	2	31	11	28	3rd	**Not held**		**Mohammad Ahmadzadeh**	**16**	Salehnia
1989-90	GL	18	9	6	3	27	10	24	**1st**	**Not held**		**Mohammad Ahmadzadeh**	**14**	Salehnia
1990-91	Div 2	14	7	6	1	22	8	20	1st	**Champions**		**Mohammad Ahmadzadeh**		Salehnia
1990-91	GL	18	10	5	3	30	10	25	**1st**			**Mohammad Ahmadzadeh**		Salehnia
1991-92	Div 1	22	9	8	5	21	11	26	4th	Final				Salehnia
1992-93	Div 1	14	4	6	4	18	15	14	4th	**Not held**				Salehnia
1992-93	GPC	7	6	1	0	9	2	13	**1st**	**Not held**				Salehnia
1993-94	Div 1	26	5	10	11	16	26	20	13th					
1993-94	GPC	8	4	2	2	8	5	10	**2nd**					Salehnia
1994-95	Div 1	22	7	7	6	23	16	24	7th					Salehnia
1995-96	Div 1	30	9	10	11	21	25	37	12th					Salehnia
1996-97	Div 1	30	8	9	13	32	42	33	14th					Salehnia
1997-98	Div 2	32	16	10	6	40	20	58	1st	**Not held**				Irandoost
1998-99	Div 1	30	7	11	12	12	21	26	13th			**Payan Rafat**	4	Irandoost
1999-00	Div 2	18	8	5	5	22	13	29	3rd					Irandoost
2000-01	Div 2	26	14	7	5	33	18	49	2nd					Ahmadzadeh
2001-02	IPL	26	6	9	11	20	36	27	12th			**Pejman Noori** & **Bijan Hosseini**	5	Ahmadzadeh
2002-03	IPL	26	6	8	12	17	34	26	14th			**Mohammad Gholami**	3	Salehnia
2003-04	Div 1	30	15	10	5	56	21	55	2nd					Salehnia
2004-05	IPL	30	10	11	9	34	27	41	7th	1/8 Final		**Ali Ghorbani** & **Mohammad Gholamin**	5	Irandoost
2005-06	IPL	30	10	6	14	29	38	36	11th	Quarter Final		**Mohammad Gholamin**	8	Irandoost
2006-07	IPL	30	7	11	12	21	30	32	14th	1/8 Final		**Amir Khodamoradi**	5	Ahmadzadeh
2007-08	IPL	34	8	12	14	32	41	36	16th	1/16 Final		**Jalal Rafkhaei**	8	Ahmadzadeh
2008-09	IPL	34	9	13	12	31	43	40	12th	1/8 Final		**Jalal Rafkhaei**	11	Ahmadzadeh
2009-10	IPL	34	10	11	13	31	47	41	12th	1/8 Final		**Adriano Alvez**	6	Ahmadzadeh/ Pourgholami
2010-11	IPL	34	13	9	12	33	32	48	8th	Final		**Mehrdad Oladi**	14	Pourgholami
2011-12	IPL	34	9	12	13	32	33	39	15th	Round of 32		**Jalal Rafkhaei**	8	Pourgholami
2012-13	IPL	34	9	13	12	34	39	40	13th	Round of 32		**Jalal Rafkhaei**	**19**	Pourgholami/ Ahmadzadeh
2013-14	IPL	30	13	6	11	39	36	44	7th	Round of 16		**Mehdi Daghagheleh**	11	Skočić
2014-15	IPL	30	6	12	12	26	34	30	13th	Round of 16			6	Irandoost/ Mojsilović/ Karimi

=== Key ===
- P = Played
- W = Games won
- D = Games drawn
- L = Games lost
- F = Goals for
- A = Goals against
- Pts = Points
- Pos = Final position
- CWC = Asian Cup Winners Cup
- ACL = AFC Champions League
- TJC = Takht Jamshid Cup
- GL = Gilan League
- QL = Qods League
- GPC = Gilan Pro Cup
- Div 1 = Azadegan League
- Div 2 = 2nd Division
- IPL = Iran Pro League

Champions	Runners-up

== See also ==
Malavan F.C.
Takht Jamshid Cup
Azadegan League
Iran Pro League
Hazfi Cup
