= Gilan derby =

Soccer team derby in Rasht and Anzali, Gilan, Iran

| Damash | Sepidrood | Malavan |

Malavan-Sepidrood rivalry
- Location: Anzali, Iran; Rasht, Iran
- Teams: Malavan; Sepidrood
- First meeting: Malavan 2–1 Sepidrood (1975)
- Latest meeting: Sepidrood 1–1 Malavan; 2019–20 Azadegan League
- Next meeting: TBA

Statistics
- Total meetings: 40 matches
- Most wins: Malavan (16)
- Top scorer: Mohammad Ahmadzadeh (10)
- Largest victory: Sepidrood 1–3 Malavan; 2017–18 Hazfi Cup (9 September 2017)

Damash-Malavan rivalry
- Location: Rasht, Iran; Anzali, Iran
- Teams: Damash; Malavan
- Latest meeting: Damash 0–0 Malavan; 2019–20 Azadegan League
- Next meeting: TBA

Statistics
- Total meetings: 26 matches
- Most wins: Both (8)
- Top scorer: Jalal Rafkhaei (5)
- Largest victory: Malavan 3–0 Damash; 2004–05 Iran Pro League; 2013–14 Iran Pro League

Gilan Derby or Classic Gil is a three-way derby between soccer teams in Rasht and Anzali in Gilan province, Iran. The first derby occurred in 1976, with the confrontation between Sepidrud and Malavan in the first round of the Hazfi Cup. This game ended in favor of the students of Bahman Salehnia with two goals from Ghafour Jahani and Aziz Espandar.

== History ==
At first, the city is facing a battle between Malavan's whites and Sepidrood's reds.

== Date of establishment of clubs ==
Damash: It was established in 1960 under the name of Taj Rasht, later renamed Abouzar Rasht, then Esteghlal Rasht Municipality, then Pegah Gilan and finally Damash.

Sepidrood: In 1968, this team was formed with the name of Salamatbakhsh Rasht and in 1973, the name Sepidrood was chosen for this club.

Malavan: Established in 1969.

== Malavan vs Sepidrood Results ==
| No. | Season | Malavan vs Sepidrood | Malavan's goal | Sepidrood's goal | Venue | Competition | Comments |
|---|---|---|---|---|---|---|---|
| 1 | 1976 | 2–1 | Ghafour Jahani – Aziz Espandar | Hossein Kamyab | Anzali | Hazfi Cup | |
| 2 | 1979 | 0–1 | – | Hamidreza Mansouri | Rasht | Friendly | Enghelab Cup |
| 3 | 1982 | 1–2 | Ahmad Espandar | Hamidreza Mansouri – Rasoul Haghdoust | Rasht | Friendly | Damparvari Cup |
| 4 | 1982–83 | 0–2 | – | Mehrdad Houshangi – Hamidreza Mansouri | Rasht | Gilan Province League | |
| 5 | 1982–83 | 0–0 | – | | Anzali | Gilan Province League | |
| 6 | 1983–84 | 0–0 | – | | Rasht | Gilan Province League | |
| 7 | 1983–84 | 2–1 | Mohammad Ghadir Bahri 70'(p.) – Sirous Ghayeghran 118' | Mohammad Ahmadpour | Anzali | Gilan Province League | |
| 8 | 1984–85 | 0–0 | – | | Rasht | Gilan Province League | |
| 9 | 1984–85 | 0–0 | – | | Anzali | Gilan Province League | |
| 10 | 1985–86 | 0–2 | – | Hajipour – Rasoul Haghdoust | Anzali | Gilan Province League | |
| 11 | 1985–86 | 0–1 | – | Hajipour | Rasht | Gilan Province League | |
| 12 | 1986–87 | 2–0 | Hamid Mohammadian – Ahmad Espandar | – | Anzali | Gilan Province League | |
| 13 | 1986–87 | 1–1 | Mohammad Ahmadzadeh | Seyed Ali Mohammadi | Rasht | Gilan Province League | |
| 14 | 1987 | 2–0 | Mohammad Ahmadzadeh (2) | – | Rasht | Friendly | |
| 15 | 1987–88 | 0–0 | Hamid Mohammadian – Ahmad Espandar | – | Anzali | Gilan Province League | |
| 16 | 1987–88 | 2–0 | Sirous Ghayeghran (2) | – | Rasht | Gilan Province League | |
| 17 | 1988–89 | 1–1 | Mohammad Ahmadzadeh | Iraj Amali | Rasht | Gilan Province League | |
| 18 | 1988–89 | 1–0 | Gholam Mohammadvand | – | Anzali | Gilan Province League | |
| 19 | 1989–90 | 2–1 | Mohammad Ahmadzadeh – Hamid Mohammadian | Hamidreza Mansouri | Anzali | Gilan Province League | |
| 20 | 1989–90 | 2–0 | Mohammad Ahmadzadeh – Nader Ezzatollahi | – | Rasht | Gilan Province League | |
| 21 | 1990 | 1–1 | Mohammad Ahmadzadeh | Hamidreza Mansouri | Rasht | Gilan Super Cup | |
| 22 | 1990–91 | 2–1 | Mohammad Ahmadzadeh – Hamid Mohammadian | Ali Barari | Anzali | Gilan Province League | |
| 23 | 1990–91 | 1–1 | Sirous Ghayeghran | Siavash Naseh | Rasht | Gilan Province League | |
| 24 | 1990–91 | 2–1 | Mohammad Ahmadzadeh – Gholam Mohammadvand | Issa Hashemi | Anzali | Local League | |
| 25 | 1990–91 | 1–1 | Mohammad Ahmadzadeh | Siavash Naseh | Rasht | Local League | |
| 26 | 1991–92 | 0–0 | – | | Rasht | Gilan Province League | |
| 27 | 1991–92 | 0–0 | – | | Anzali | Gilan Province League | |
| 28 | 1992–93 | 1–0 | Fazel Ghadiri | – | Rasht | Gilan Province League | |
| 29 | 1992–93 | 1–1 | Hossein Davoudi | Siavash Naseh | Anzali | Gilan Province League | |
| 30 | 1991–92 | 1–2 | Abdollah Pandidan | Hamid Rostami – Iraj Khali | Rasht | Gilan Province League | |
| 31 | 1991–92 | 2–0 | Ebrahim Badpasand – Payan Rafat | – | Anzali | Gilan Province League | |
| 32 | 1995 | 0–1 | – | Mohammadreza Gholipour | Rasht | Exhibition | Khazar Intern. Cup |
| 33 | 1996 | 0–0; Pen. | – | – | Rasht | Exhibition | Khazar Intern. Cup |
| 34 | 2009–10 | 2–1 | Mehrdad Oladi (2) | Milad Gohari | Anzali | Hazfi Cup | Round of 32 |
| 35 | 2016–17 | 1–0 | Hossein Shanani | – | Anzali | Azadegan League | |
| 36 | 2016–17 | 1–1 | Hossein Shanani | Milad Ghorbanzadeh | Rasht | Azadegan League | |
| 37 | 2017–18 | 3–1 | Pejman Nouri 31', Babak Moradi 99'(p.), Mohammadreza Naghdipour 114' | Hossein Ebrahimi 88'(p.) | Rasht | Hazfi Cup | Round of 32 |
| 38 | 2018–19 | 0–1 | – | Mohammad Gholami 57'(p.) | Anzali | Hazfi Cup | Round of 32 |
| 39 | 2019-Nov-05 | 2–1 | Mahyar Zahmatkesh 40', Hadi Habibinejad 81' | Mahyar Nouri 42' | Anzali | Azadegan League | |
| 40 | 2020-Jul-06 | 1–1 | Mohammad Ali Akbarkhah 35' | Babak Abdollahzadeh 45' | Rasht | Azadegan League | |

== Summary of results ==
| | Apps | Malavan wins | Draws | Sepidrood wins |
|---|---|---|---|---|
| Official Matches | 35 | 15 | 15 | 5 |
| Friendlies and Exhibitions | 5 | 1 | 1 | 3 |
| Total | 40 | 16 | 16 | 8 |

| Position | Teams | Matches | Wins | Draws | Loses | Goals For | Goals Against | Goal Difference |
|---|---|---|---|---|---|---|---|---|
| 1 | Malavan | 40 | 16 | 16 | 8 | 40 | 28 | +12 |
| 2 | Sepidrood | 40 | 8 | 16 | 16 | 28 | 40 | –12 |

== Trophies ==
| Team | Iranian Leagues | Iranian Hazfi Cup | Gilan Province League | Gilan Province Cup | Grand Total |
|---|---|---|---|---|---|
| Malavan | 0 | 3 | ? | ? | more than 20 |
| Sepidrood | 0 | 0 | 2 | 1 | 3 |

== Top goal scorers ==
| Position | Player | Club | Goals | |
|---|---|---|---|---|
| 1 | (Iran) Mohammad Ahmadzadeh | Malavan | 10 | |
| 2 | (Iran) Hamidreza Mansouri | Sepidrood | 5 | |
| 3 | (Iran) Hamid Mohammadian | Malavan | 4 | |
| 4 | (Iran) Sirous Ghayeghran | Malavan | | |
| 5 | (Iran) Ahmad Espandar | Malavan | 3 | |
| 5 | 6 | (Iran) Siavash Naseh | 3 | Sepidrood |

== Damash vs Malavan Results ==
| No. | Season | Damash vs Malavan | Damash's goal | Malavan's goal | Venue | Competition | Comments |
|---|---|---|---|---|---|---|---|
| 9 | 1991 | 2–1 | ? | ? – ? | Anzali | Azadegan League | |
| 10 | 1997 | 3–2 | ? – ? – ? | ? – ? | Anzali | Azadegan League | |
| 11 | 2001–02 | 1–2 | Atila Hejazi 45' | Bijan Hosseini 35' – Seyed Mehdi Hosseini 72' | Rasht | IPL 1st | |
| 12 | 2001–02 | 1–1 | Rahmat Feyzi Moghaddam 14' | Pejman Nouri 45' | Anzali | IPL 1st | |
| 13 | 2004–05 | 2–2 | Amirhossein Salami Bakhsh 23' – Jurkovic 78' | Hassan Ashjari 20' – Seyed Jalal Hosseini 28' | Rasht | IPL 4th | |
| 14 | 2004–05 | 0–3 | – | Ali Ghorbani 44', 55' – Mohammad Gholamin 79' | Anzali | IPL 4th | |
| 15 | 2007–08 | 0–0 | – | | Rasht | IPL 7th | |
| 16 | 2007–08 | 1–1 | Hossein Ebrahimi 8' | Maziar Zare 28' | Rasht | IPL 7th | |
| 17 | 2008–09 | 1–2 | Adriano Alves 85' | Mehran Jafari 60' – Seyed Jalal Rafkhaei 68' | Rasht | IPL 8th | |
| 18 | 2008–09 | 1–1 | Afshin Chavoshi 82' | Seyed Jalal Rafkhaei 90' | Anzali | IPL 8th | |
| 19 | 2011–12 | 1–0 | Jahangir Asgari 24' | – | Anzali | IPL 11th | |
| 20 | 2011–12 | 0–0 | – | | Rasht | IPL 11th | |
| 21 | 2012–13 | 0–0 | – | | Rasht | IPL 12th | |
| 22 | 2012–13 | 1–3 | Saeid Hallafi 90+7' | Seyed Jalal Rafkhaei 10', 90+4' – Mohammad Nozhati 77' | Anzali | IPL 12th | |
| 23 | 2013–14 | 0–1 | – | Saeid Salarzadeh 67' | Anzali | IPL 13th | |
| 24 | 2013–14 | 0–3 | – | Seyed Jalal Rafkhaei 22' – Siamak Kouroshi 29' – Shahin Saghebi 83' | Rasht | IPL 13th | |
| 25 | 2019-Aug-28 | 1–1 | Jaber Nasiri 90' | Ali Amiri 58'(p.) | Anzali | Azadegan League | |
| 26 | 2019-Jan-19 | 0–0 | | | Rasht | Azadegan League | |

== Summary of results ==
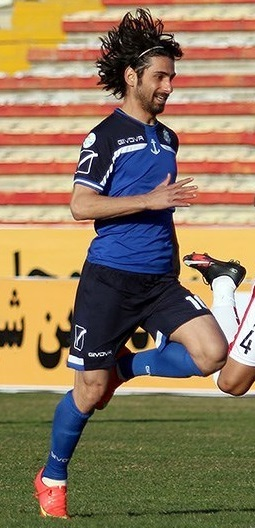
Jalal Rafkhaei, top goalscorer of rivalry with 5 goals

| Position | Teams | Matches | Wins | Draws | Loses | Goals For | Goals Against | Goal Difference |
|---|---|---|---|---|---|---|---|---|
| 1 | Malavan | 26 | 8 | 10 | 8 | 28 | 22 | +6 |
| 2 | Damash | 26 | 8 | 10 | 8 | 22 | 28 | –6 |

== Trophies ==
| Team | Iranian Leagues | Iranian Hazfi Cup | Gilan Province League | Gilan Province Cup | Grand Total |
|---|---|---|---|---|---|
| Malavan | 0 | 3 | ? | ? | more than 20 |
| Damash | 0 | 0 | 0 | 0 | 0 |

== Summary of total results ==
| Position | Teams | Matches | Wins | Draws | Loses | Goals For | Goals Against | Goal Difference |
|---|---|---|---|---|---|---|---|---|
| 1 | Malavan | 66 | 24 | 26 | 16 | 68 | 50 | +18 |
| 2 | Rasht Teams | 66 | 16 | 26 | 24 | 50 | 68 | –18 |

== See also ==
- Football in Iran
- Tehran Derby
- Isfahan Derby
- Mashhad Derby
- Persepolis F.C.–Sepahan S.C. rivalry
- Esteghlal F.C.–Sepahan S.C. rivalry
- Persepolis F.C.–Tractor S.C. rivalry
- Esteghlal F.C.–Tractor S.C rivalry
- Major football rivalries
