= List of Hazfi Cup winning managers =

This is a list of Iranian Hazfi Cup winning football managers.

== By year ==
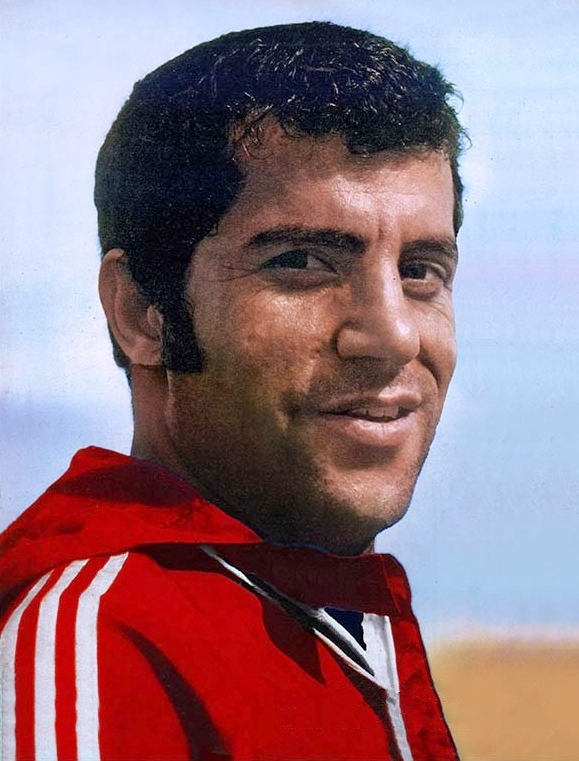
Ali Parvin who won cup in 1987–88, 1991–92 and 1998–99

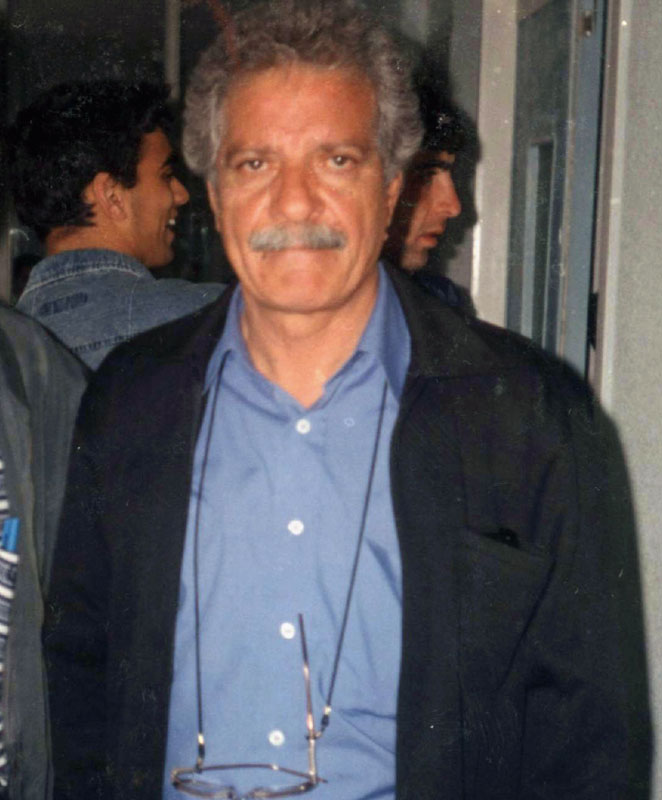
Mansour Pourheidari who won cup in 1995–96 and 1999–00

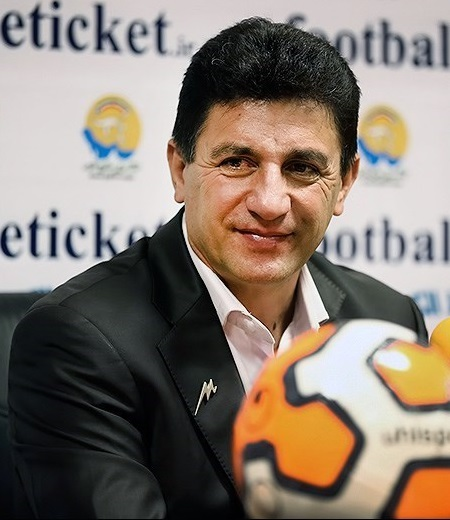
Amir Ghalenoi who won cup in 2001–02 and 2007–08

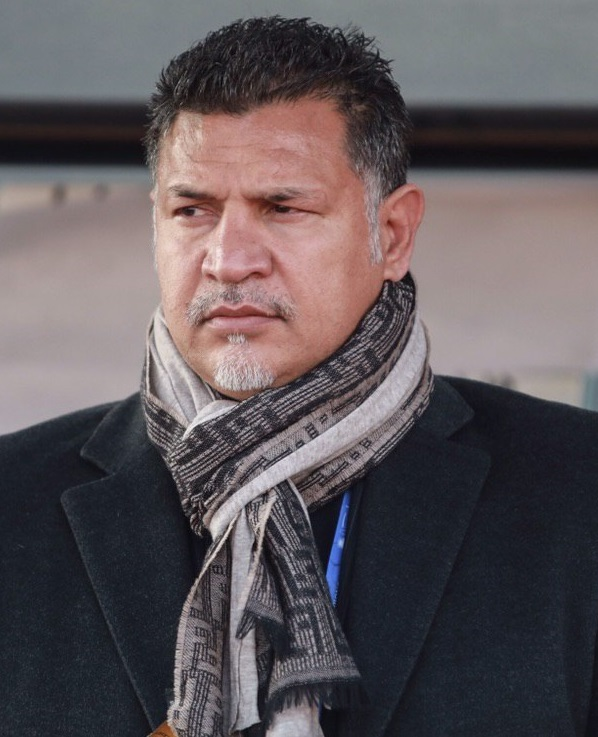
Ali Daei who won cup in 2009–10, 2010–11 and 2016–17

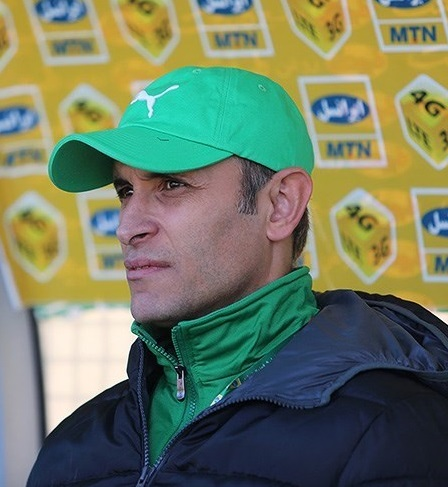
Yahya Golmohammadi who won cup in 2014–15, 2015–16 and 2022–23

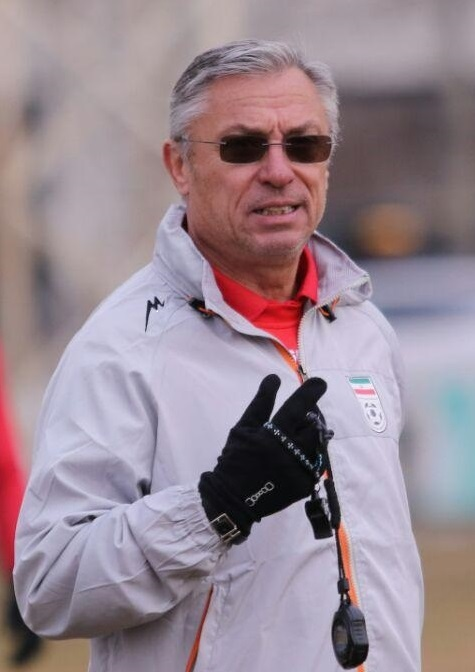
Zlatko Kranjčar who won cup in 2012–13

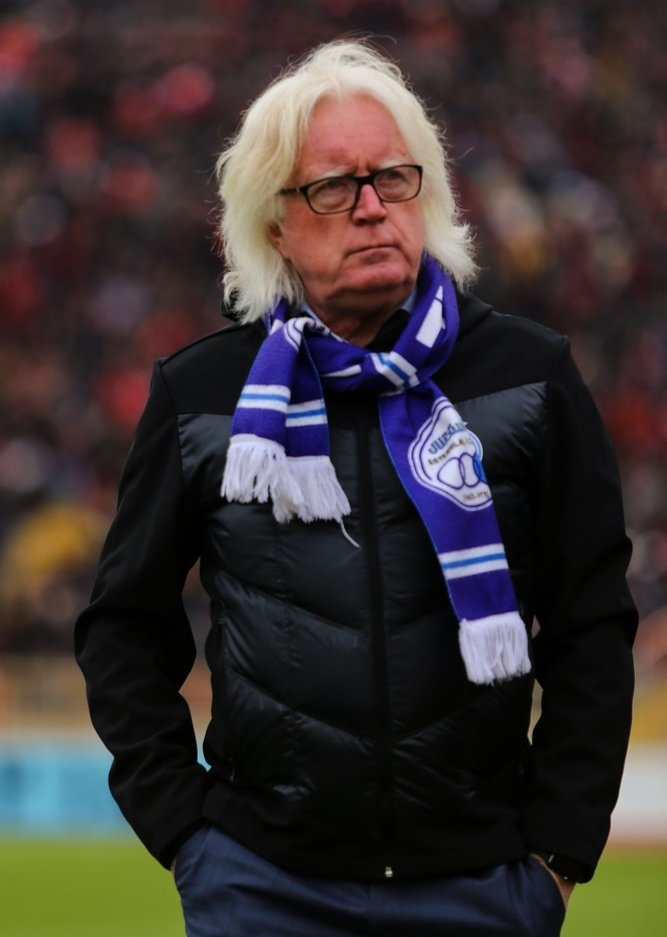
Winfried Schäfer who won cup in 2017–18

Season	Nationality	Winning manager	Club
1976	Iran	Bahman Salehnia	Malavan
1977–78	Yugoslavia	Vladimir Đekic	Taj
1986	Iran	Bahman Salehnia	Malavan
1987	Iran	Ali Parvin	Persepolis
1988–89	Iran	Majid Bagherinia	Shahin Ahvaz
1990–91	Iran	Bahman Salehnia	Malavan
1991–92	Iran	Ali Parvin	Persepolis
1993–94	Iran	Bijan Zolfagharnasab	Saipa
1994–95	Iran	Firouz Karimi	Bahman
1995–96	Iran	Mansour Pourheidari	Esteghlal
1996–97	Bosnia and Herzegovina	Ibrahim Biogradlić	Bargh Shiraz
1998–99	Iran	Ali Parvin	Persepolis
1999–00	Iran	Mansour Pourheidari	Esteghlal
2000–01	Iran	Gholam Hossein Peyrovani	Fajr Sepasi
2001–02	Iran	Amir Ghalenoei	Esteghlal
2002–03	Iran	Rasoul Korbekandi	Zob Ahan
2003–04	Iran	Farhad Kazemi	Sepahan
2004–05	Iran	Majid Jalali	Saba Battery
2005–06	Croatia	Luka Bonačić	Sepahan
2006–07	Croatia	Luka Bonačić	Sepahan
2007–08	Iran	Amir Ghalenoei	Esteghlal
2008–09	Iran	Mansour Ebrahimzadeh	Zob Ahan
2009–10	Iran	Ali Daei	Persepolis
2010–11	Iran	Ali Daei	Persepolis
2011–12	Iran	Parviz Mazloomi	Esteghlal
2012–13	Croatia	Zlatko Kranjčar	Sepahan
2013–14	Portugal	Toni	Tractor
2014–15	Iran	Yahya Golmohammadi	Zob Ahan
2015–16	Iran	Yahya Golmohammadi	Zob Ahan
2016–17	Iran	Ali Daei	Naft Tehran
2017–18	Germany	Winfried Schafer	Esteghlal
2018–19	Croatia	Branko Ivanković	Persepolis
2019–20	Iran	Saket Elhami	Tractor
2020–21	Iran	Javad Nekounam	Foolad
2021–22	Iran	Saket Elhami	Nassaji Mazandaran
2022–23	Iran	Yahya Golmohammadi	Persepolis
2023–24	Portugal	José Morais	Sepahan
2024–25	Iran	Mojtaba Jabbari	Esteghal

== The performance of the managers in the finals ==
Rank	Nationality	Manager	Won	Runner-up	Years won	Years runner-up	Clubs
1	Iran	Bahman Salehnia	3	3	1975–76, 1986–87, 1990–91	1987–88, 1988–89, 1991–92	Malavan
2	Iran	**Yahya Golmohammadi**	3	1	2014–15, 2015–16, 2022–23	2012–13	Persepolis, Zob Ahan
3	Iran	Ali Parvin	3	0	1987–88, 1990–91, 1998–99		Persepolis
3	Iran	**Ali Daei**	3	0	2009–10, 2010–11, 2016–17		Persepolis, Naft Tehran
5	Iran	**Amir Ghalenoei**	2	2	2001–02, 2007–08	2003–04, 2016–17	Esteghlal, Tractor Sazi
6	Iran	Mansour Pourheidari	2	1	1995–96, 1999–00	1990–91	Esteghlal
6	Croatia	**Luka Bonačić**	2	1	2005–06, 2006–07	2013–14	Sepahan, Mes Kerman
8	Iran	**Saket Elhami**	2	0	2019–20, 2021–22		Tractor, Nassaji Mazandaran
9	Iran	**Farhad Kazemi**	1	3	2003–04	1996–97, 1999–00, 2009–10	Bahman, Sepahan, Gostaresh Foolad
10	Iran	Gholam Hossein Peyrovani	1	2	2000–01	2001–02, 2002–03	Fajr Sepasi
11	Iran	**Parviz Mazloomi**	1	1	2011–12	2015–16	Esteghlal
12	Yugoslavia	Vladimir Đekic	1	0	1976–77		Esteghlal
12	Iran	Majid Bagherinia	1	0	1988–89		Shahin Ahvaz
12	Iran	Bijan Zolfagharnasab	1	0	1993–94		Saipa
12	Iran	**Firouz Karimi**	1	0	1994–95		Bahman
12	Bosnia and Herzegovina	Ibrahim Biogradlić	1	0	1996–97		Bargh Shiraz
12	Iran	Rasoul Korbekandi	1	0	2002–03		Zob Ahan
12	Iran	**Majid Jalali**	1	0	2004–05		Saba Battery
12	Iran	**Mansour Ebrahimzadeh**	1	0	2008–09		Zob Ahan
12	Croatia	**Zlatko Kranjčar**	1	0	2012–13		Sepahan
12	Portugal	**Toni**	1	0	2013–14		Tractor Sazi
12	Germany	**Winfried Schäfer**	1	0	2017–18		Esteghlal
12	Croatia	**Branko Ivanković**	1	0	2018–19		Persepolis
12	Iran	**Javad Nekounam**	1	0	2020–21		Foolad
12	Portugal	**José Morais**	1	0	2023–24		Sepahan
12	Iran	**Mojtaba Jabbari**	1	0	2024–25		Esteghlal
27	Iran	**Farhad Majidi**	0	2		2019–20, 2020–21	Esteghlal
28	Iran	Mohammad Bayati	0	1		1975–76	Tractor Sazi
28	Iran	Ahmad Khodadad	0	1		1976–77	Homa
28	Iran	Ahmad Javdaneh	0	1		1986–87	Kheibar Khoramabad
28	Brazil	Lula Gallo	0	1		1993–94	Joonoob Ahvaz
28	Romania	Vasile Godja	0	1		1994–95	Tractor Sazi
28	Iran	Mahmoud Yavari	0	1		1995–96	Bargh Shiraz
28	Russia	Yevgeni Skomorokhov	0	1		1998–99	Esteghlal
28	Iran	Bahram Atef	0	1		2000–01	Zob Ahan
28	Iran	**Akbar Misaghian**	0	1		2004–05	Aboomoslem
28	Turkey	**Mustafa Denizli**	0	1		2005–06	Persepolis
28	Iran	Mohammad Hossein Ziaei	0	1		2006–07	Saba Battery
28	Iran	Nader Dastneshan	0	1		2007–08	Pegah
28	Iran	**Mehdi Tartar**	0	1		2008–09	Rah Ahan
28	Iran	**Farhad Pourgholami**	0	1		2010–11	Malavan
28	Iran	**Hamid Derakhshan**	0	1		2011–12	Shahin Bushehr
28	Iran	**Alireza Mansourian**	0	1		2014–15	Naft Tehran
28	Croatia	**Dragan Skočić**	0	1		2017–18	Khooneh be Khooneh
28	Iran	**Siamak Farahani**	0	1		2018–19	Damash
28	Iran	Mehdi Rahmati	0	1		2021–22	Aluminium Arak
28	Portugal	Ricardo Sá Pinto	0	1		2022–23	Esteghlal
28	Iran	**Moharram Navidkia**	0	1		2023–24	Mes Rafsanjan
28	Iran	**Maziar Zare**	0	1		2024–25	Malavan

**Bold**	=	Still active as manager

== By nationality ==
Country	Managers	Total wins
Iran	18	29
Croatia	3	4
Yugoslavia	1	1
Bosnia and Herzegovina	1	1
Portugal	2	2
Germany	1	1

== See also ==
- Hazfi Cup
- List of Iranian Football League winning managers
- List of Iranian Super Cup winning managers
- List of Iranian Futsal League winning managers
