= List of Sepidrood Rasht F.C. seasons =

The table below chronicles the achievements of Sepidrood in various competitions since 1974.

Season	League									Hazfi Cup	Leagues Top Goalscorer		Manager(s)
Season	Division	P	W	D	L	F	A	Pts	Pos	Hazfi Cup	Name(s)	Goals	Manager(s)
1974–75	2nd Division								4th				Hossein Shamlou
1975–76	2nd Division	6	3	2	1	6	5	8	3rd				Hossein Shamlou
1976–77	2nd Division	18	7	7	4	14	9	21	4th				Fereydoun Asgarzadeh
1977–78	2nd Division	22	8	11	3	19	9	27	4th				Fereydoun Asgarzadeh
1978–79	2nd Division	14	6	2	6	12	13	14	5th				Fereydoun Asgarzadeh
1979–80	Not Held Due to Iranian Revolution												
1980–81	Revolution Cup								1st		Hassan Bohloul	7	Hassan Habibi
1981–82	Gilan League								2nd				
1982–83	Gilan League	6	4	2	0	7	2	10	1st				Ahmad Soumi
1983–84	Gilan League	9	5	3	1	19	9	13	2nd				Ahmad Soumi
1984–85	Gilan League								2nd		Hamidreza Mansouri		Ahmad Soumi
1985–86	Gilan League	18	10	7	1	22	5	27	1st		Hamidreza Mansouri		Ahmad Soumi
1986–87	Gilan League	18	8	6	4	22	15	30	2nd				
1987–88	Gilan League								2nd				
1988–89	Gilan League												
1989–90	Gilan League								2nd				
1990–91	2nd Division	14	4	5	5	15	15	13	5th				
1991–92	2nd Division	22	9	11	2	31	15	29	3rd				
1992–93	Azadegan League	14	2	3	9	9	21	7	8th				Hassan Rowshan
1993–94	2nd Division	26	8	12	6	30	33	28	5th				Hasan Azarniya
1994–95	2nd Division												Hasan Azarniya
1995–96	3rd Division												Fereydoun Asgarzadeh
1996–97	2nd Division								2nd				Majid Jahanpour
1997–98	2nd Division	18	9	5	4	23	10	32	4th				
1998–99	2nd Division	18	2	10	6	9	17	16	8th	1/64 Final			Ahmad Soumi
1999–00	3rd Division								18th	First round			Saeed Akhondi
2000–01	Gilan League								1st	Did not qualify			Iraj Khavali
2001–02	Gilan League								3rd				Iraj Khavali / Hamid Rajabiniya
2002–03	Gilan League								3rd				Ahmad Soumi
2003–04	3rd Division								2nd				Farhad Hosseinpour
2004–05	2nd Division	18	5	7	6	19	18	22	6th				Farhad Hosseinpour
2005–06	2nd Division	22	9	7	6	24	21	34	5th	1/64 Final			Farhad Hosseinpour
2006–07	2nd Division	26	5	8	13	22	37	23	13th	First round			Farhad Hosseinpour
2007–08	2nd Division	26	13	9	4	34	15	48	3rd	1/64 Final			Farhad Hosseinpour
2008–09	2nd Division	16	6	4	6	22	19	22	4th	1/64 Final			Farhad Hosseinpour
2009–10	2nd Division	6	4	1	1	14	6	13	1st	1/16 Final	Soheil Haghshenas	21	Farhad Hosseinpour
2010–11	Azadegan League	26	4	8	14	21	39	20	14th	1/16 Final	Milad Poursafshekan	7	Farhad Hosseinpour
2011–12	2nd Division	26	9	8	9	26	26	35	10th	First round			Farhad Hosseinpour
2012–13	2nd Division	26	12	7	7	46	23	43	4th	Did not Enter			Farhad Hosseinpour
2013–14	2nd Division	26	5	9	12	27	39	24	12th	1/32 Final			Rasoul Haghdoust/Mohsen Nasr Abdolahi
2014–15	2nd Division	10	2	6	2	11	10	12	3rd	1/64 Final	Emad Mirjavan	18	Afshin Nazemi
2015–16	2nd Division	10	6	2	2	9	5	20	1st	1/32 Final	Mi'ad Yazdani	8	Ali Nazarmohammadi / Farshad Pious
2016–17	Azadegan League	34	17	10	7	35	24	61	2nd	1/16 Final	Soheil Haghshenas	14	Ali Nazarmohammadi
2017–18	Iran Pro League	30	8	6	16	24	39	30	13th	1/16 Final	Mohammad Nozhati	6	Ali Nazarmohammadi / Ali Karimi
2018–19	Iran Pro League	30	3	11	16	24	53	20	15th	1/8 Final	Mohammad Gholami	5	Ali Karimi / Nader Dastneshan

== See also ==
- Sepidrood Rasht F.C.
- Takht Jamshid Cup
- Azadegan League
- Iran Football's 2nd Division
- Hazfi Cup
