= List of Iranian Football League managers =

The Persian Gulf pro league is a professional football league in Iran which is the top tier of the Iranian football. The league was formed in 2001–02 as a replacement for the original Azadegan League. sometimes given the alternative title of head coach. The Persian Gulf Pro League and Azadegan League are the only fully professional football leagues in Iran. The Pro League consists of 16 clubs at the top of the Iranian football league system. The remaining 20 clubs are play in Azadegan League.

Some of these managers were appointed as caretaker managers prior to being given a permanent position; if so their caretaker appointment date is denoted in italics. Some managers listed have had more than one spell in charge at their current club or had spells at more than one club, however their time as manager is counted only from the date of their last appointment by their latest club. This list includes every manager currently managing a club in the Persian Gulf Pro League and Azadegan League, in order of the date that they took up their appointment.

Branko Ivanković, manager of Persian Gulf Pro League side Persepolis since April 6, 2015, is the longest serving manager in any of the two professional divisions in Iranian football.

== Most games managed in the Premier League ==
List of managers who have taken charge of at least 100 Persian Gulf Pro League matches. After week 28. 2018-19
Rank	Manager	Games	Club(s)
1	(Iran) **Amir Ghalenoei**	457	Esteghlal, Zob Ahan, Tractor Sazi, Sepahan, Mes, Esteghlal Ahvaz
2	(Iran) **Majid Jalali**	383	Nassaji, Paykan, Saipa, Tractor Sazi, Foolad, Saba Battery, Pas
3	(Iran) Ali Daee	336	Naft Tehran, Saba Qom, Persepolis, Rah Ahan, Saipa
4	(Iran) Gholam Peyrovani	267	Fajr Sepasi, Sanat Naft
5	(Iran) Farhad Kazemi	256	Aboomoslem, Sepahan, Paykan, Saba Battery, Mes, Steel Azin, Gostaresh, Zob Ahan, Rah Ahan, Siah Jamegan, Machine Sazi
6	(Iran) Mahmoud Yavari	247	Bargh Shiraz, Sepahan, Fajr Sepasi, Pas, Steel Azin, Tractor Sazi, Zob Ahan, Aboomoslem, Esteghlal Ahvaz, Rah Ahan, Shahin Bushehr, Mes, Pas Hamedan
7	(Iran) Mohammad Ahmadzadeh	231	Malavan, Bargh Shiraz, Esteghlal Ahvaz, Moghavemat Sepasi, Paykan
8	(Iran) Abdollah Veisi	229	Peykan, Saba Qom, Esteghlal Khuzestan, Sepahan, Foolad
9	(Iran) Parviz Mazloumi	219	Aboumoslem, Mes Kerman, Esteghlal, Aluminium
9	(Iran) Akbar Misaghian	219	Aboumoslem, Rah Ahan, Esteghlal Ahvaz, Mes Kerman, Padideh
9	(Iran) **Firouz Karimi**	219	Aboumoslem, Esteghlal, Esteghlal Ahvaz, Rah Ahan, Saba Battery, Gostaresh, Paykan, Zob Ahan, Malavan, Sanat Naft
12	(Iran) Mansour Ebrahimzadeh	215	Zob Ahan, Naft Tehran, Rah Ahan, Paykan, Mes Kerman, Sepahan
13	(Iran) **Hossein Faraki**	207	Zob Ahan,
14	(Iran) Samad Marfavi	203	Esteghlal, Mes Kerman, Peykan, Saba Qom
15	(Croatia) Vinko Begović	194	Foolad, Persepolis, Pas Hamedan
16	(Croatia) Luka Bonačić	180	Zob Ahan, Foolad, Esteghlal Ahvaz, Sepahan, Mes Kerman, Gostaresh, Zob Ahan
16	(Iran) **Yahya Golmohammadi**	180	Padideh, Tractorsazi, Persepolis, Zob Ahan, Naft Tehran
18	(Iran) Mohammad Mayeli Kohan	177	Gahar Zagros, Peykan, Saba Qom, Saipa
18	(Iran) Faraz Kamalvand	177	Sanat Naft, Gostaresh, Tractor Sazi
20	**(Iran) Mehdi Tartar**	166	Rah Ahan, Pars Jonoubi, Saba Qom, Gostaresh
21	**(Croatia) Branko Ivanković**	123	Persepolis
(**Bold** denotes manager currently managing a Premier League club); Statistics correct as of 16 February 2019.

== Notes ==
‡ indicates player-manager

== See also ==
- List of Takht Jamshid and Iran Pro League winning managers
- List of Hazfi Cup winning managers
