= 1993–94 Azadegan League =

3rd season of Azadegan League

Azadegan League
- Season: 1993–94
- Champions: Saipa
- Asian Club Championship: Saipa
- Asian Winners' Cup: Jonoob Ahvaz
- Matches: 182
- Goals: 386 (2.12 per match)
- Top goalscorer: Abbas Simakani (11)

The 1993–94 Azadegan League was the third season of the Azadegan League, the top-level league of professional football in Iran at the time, that was won by Saipa.

== League Table ==
Pos	Team	Pld	W	D	L	GF	GA	GD	Pts	Qualification
1	Saipa (C)	26	10	14	2	41	22	+19	34	Qualification for the 1994–95 Asian Club Championship
2	Persepolis	26	10	11	5	40	25	+15	31	
3	Jonoob Ahvaz	26	13	5	8	33	21	+12	31	Qualification for the 1994–95 Asian Cup Winners' Cup
4	Zob Ahan	26	9	11	6	37	29	+8	29	
5	PAS Tehran	26	9	11	6	28	24	+4	29	
6	Nassaji Mazandaran	26	9	11	6	30	27	+3	29	
7	Sanat Naft	26	9	9	8	26	28	−2	27	
8	Tractor Sazi	26	8	10	8	23	29	−6	26	
9	Keshavarz	26	7	10	9	29	25	+4	24	
10	Chooka Talesh	26	5	13	8	19	23	−4	23	
11	Sepahan	26	7	8	11	16	26	−10	22	
12	Bargh Shiraz	26	5	11	10	27	38	−11	21	
13	Malavan	26	5	10	11	16	26	−10	20	
14	Esteghlal Ahvaz	26	4	10	12	21	33	−12	18	

(C) Champions

- Iranian Football Champions: Saipa
- Relegated teams : _
- Promoted teams :Esteghlal, Machine Sazi, Shahdari Sari, Naft Ghaemshahr, Bank Tejarat, Payam Gach Khorasan, Pars Khodro, Ararat, Qods Sari, Shahin Bushehr

== Top goal scorer ==
- Abbas Simakani (Zob Ahan) (17 goals)
