= Rastakhiz =

Rastakhiz (Persian رستاخیز "resurrection") may refer to:

- Rastakhiz F.C., an Iranian football team
- Rastakhiz Party, an Iranian political party
- Hussein Who Said No or Rastakhiz, a 2014 historical religious Iranian film
