= 1990–91 Iran 2nd Division =

Iran Football's 2nd Division
- Season: 1990–91
- Promoted: Malavan; Esteghlal Rasht; Tractor; Aboomoslem; Nassaji Mazandaran; Taam Esfehan; Koma Shiraz; Esteghlal Ahvaz; Jonoob Ahvaz

The 1990–91 Iran 2nd Division football season was played in four groups of eight teams each. The top nine teams gained promotion to the Azadegan League, which was at the time the top-level football league in Iran.

== Standings ==
=== Group A ===
| Pos | Team | Pld | W | D | L | GF | GA | GD | Pts | Promotion (Note: Error in table: 40 total wins != 42 total losses) |
|---|---|---|---|---|---|---|---|---|---|---|
| 1 | Malavan | 14 | 7 | 6 | 1 | 22 | 8 | +14 | 20 | Promoted 1991–92 Azadegan League |
| 2 | Esteghlal Rasht | 14 | 8 | 3 | 3 | 18 | 6 | +12 | 19 | Promoted 1991–92 Azadegan League |
| 3 | Tractor | 14 | 6 | 7 | 1 | 12 | 4 | +8 | 19 | Promoted 1991–92 Azadegan League |
| 4 | Machine Sazi | 14 | 7 | 4 | 3 | 20 | 10 | +10 | 18 | |
| 5 | Sepidrood Rasht | 14 | 4 | 5 | 5 | 15 | 15 | 0 | 13 | |
| 6 | Bank Bakhtaran | 14 | 4 | 3 | 7 | 11 | 19 | −8 | 11 | |
| 7 | Pakdis Uromiah | 14 | 2 | 2 | 10 | 5 | 18 | −13 | 6 | |
| 8 | Persepolis Bijar | 14 | 2 | 0 | 12 | 9 | 36 | −27 | 4 | |

=== Group B ===
| Pos | Team | Pld | W | D | L | GF | GA | GD | Pts | Promotion |
|---|---|---|---|---|---|---|---|---|---|---|
| 1 | Aboomoslem | 14 | 10 | 3 | 1 | 24 | 7 | +17 | 23 | Promoted 1991–92 Azadegan League |
| 2 | Shahrdari Sari | 14 | 8 | 5 | 1 | 21 | 8 | +13 | 21 | |
| 3 | Nassaji Mazandaran | 14 | 7 | 4 | 3 | 29 | 12 | +17 | 18 | Promoted 1991–92 Azadegan League |
| 4 | Payam Mashhad | 14 | 6 | 5 | 3 | 16 | 9 | +7 | 17 | |
| 5 | PAS Hamedan | 14 | 7 | 1 | 6 | 18 | 19 | −1 | 15 | |
| 6 | Shahrdari Arak | 14 | 4 | 3 | 7 | 13 | 20 | −7 | 11 | |
| 7 | Olampic Zanjan | 14 | 1 | 2 | 11 | 7 | 31 | −24 | 4 | |
| 8 | Naft Shahrud | 14 | 1 | 1 | 12 | 12 | 33 | −21 | 3 | |

=== Group C ===
| Pos | Team | Pld | W | D | L | GF | GA | GD | Pts | Promotion |
|---|---|---|---|---|---|---|---|---|---|---|
| 1 | Taam Esfehan | 14 | 10 | 3 | 1 | 26 | 5 | +21 | 23 | Promoted 1991–92 Azadegan League |
| 2 | Bargh Shiraz | 14 | 8 | 4 | 2 | 22 | 7 | +15 | 20 | |
| 3 | Koma Shiraz | 14 | 6 | 4 | 4 | 20 | 8 | +12 | 16 | Promoted 1991–92 Azadegan League |
| 4 | Zhandarmeri Esfahan | 14 | 6 | 4 | 4 | 22 | 19 | +3 | 16 | |
| 5 | Daraei Kerman | 14 | 4 | 4 | 6 | 19 | 18 | +1 | 12 | |
| 6 | Kaveh Bandar Abas | 14 | 4 | 2 | 8 | 16 | 22 | −6 | 10 | |
| 7 | Esteghamat Yazd | 14 | 4 | 3 | 7 | 12 | 18 | −6 | 9 (Note: 2 points deducted?) | |
| 8 | Pirouzi Chabahar | 14 | 1 | 2 | 11 | 10 | 50 | −40 | 4 | |

=== Group D ===
| Pos | Team | Pld | W | D | L | GF | GA | GD | Pts | Promotion |
|---|---|---|---|---|---|---|---|---|---|---|
| 1 | Esteghlal Ahvaz | 15 | 9 | 5 | 1 | 29 | 7 | +22 | 23 | Promoted 1991–92 Azadegan League |
| 2 | Jonoob Ahvaz | 14 | 8 | 4 | 2 | 32 | 9 | +23 | 20 | Promoted 1991–92 Azadegan League |
| 3 | Shahrdari Khorramabad | 14 | 8 | 4 | 2 | 22 | 6 | +16 | 20 | |
| 4 | Shahin Bushehr | 14 | 5 | 6 | 3 | 14 | 12 | +2 | 16 | |
| 5 | Razi Karaj | 14 | 2 | 8 | 4 | 9 | 15 | −6 | 12 | |
| 6 | Esteghamat Ilam | 14 | 3 | 2 | 9 | 11 | 20 | −9 | 8 | |
| 7 | Persepolis Dehdasht | 13 | 2 | 4 | 7 | 9 | 25 | −16 | 8 | |
| 8 | Homa Borujen | 14 | 0 | 5 | 9 | 7 | 37 | −30 | 5 | |
