= Rashid Sazmand =

Iranian football executive (born 1951)

- رشید سازمند اسفرنجان
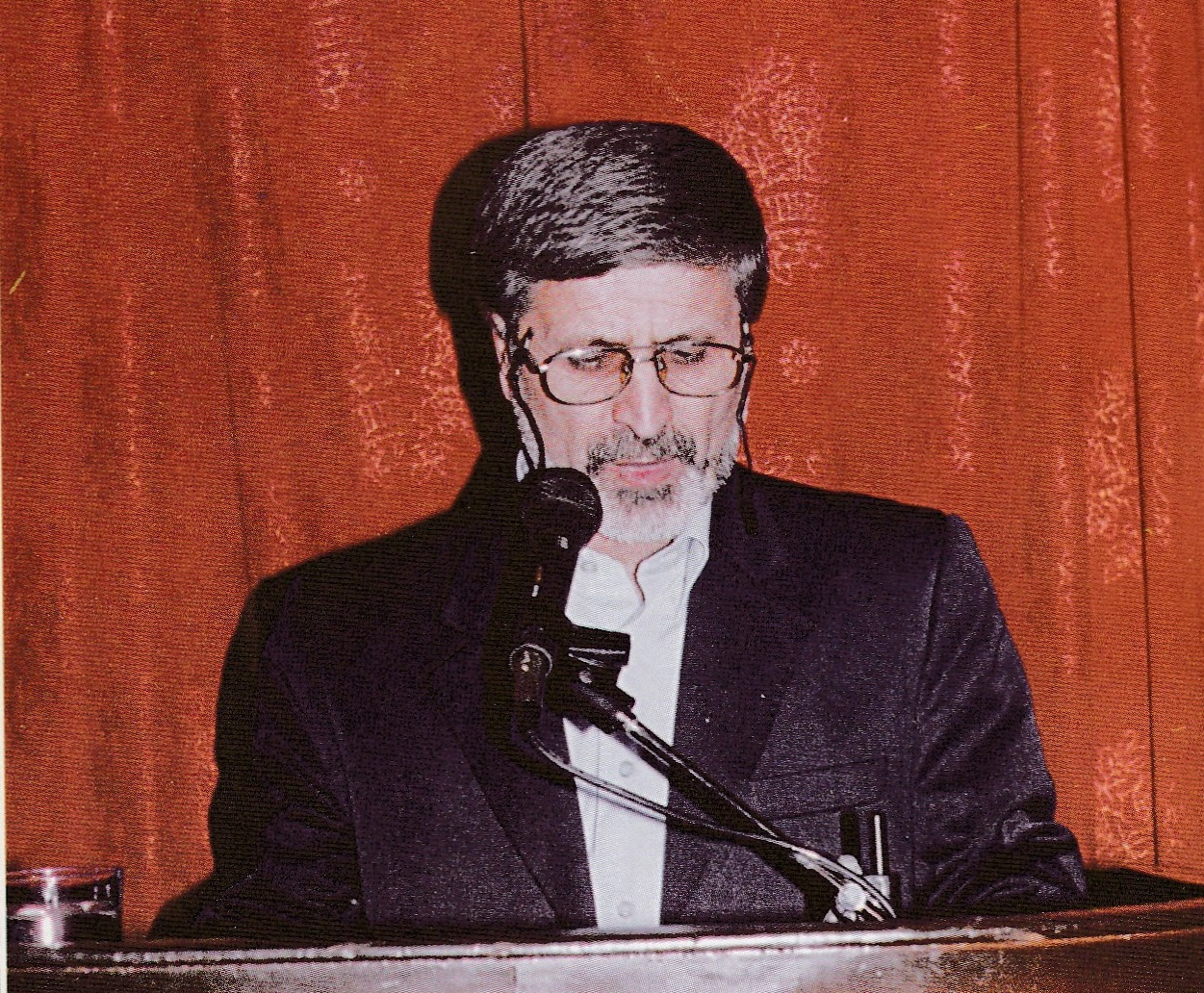

CEO and Board Member of Malavan F.C.
- In office 1996–2006
- Succeeded by: Ardeshir Pournemat

Senior Consultant and Board Member of Akam Ata Anzali Free Zone Co.
- Incumbent
- Assumed office 13 July 2019

Personal details
- Born: 24 October 1951 (age 74) Bandar-e Anzali, Iran
- Children: 2
- Occupation: Business executive

Captain Rashid Sazmand Asfaranjan (Persian: رشید سازمند; born 24 October 1951) is an Iranian business executive. He was the CEO and a board member of Malavan F.C. from 1996 to 2006. Currently, he is a senior consultant to the board of directors and a board member of Akam Ata Anzali Free Zone Co., which is an international marketing and trade, and management consulting company based in Iran.

== Career ==
=== Malavan F.C. ===
He is a former CEO and board member of Malavan F.C.

=== AKAM ATA ===
On 13 July 2019, he was assigned as a senior consultant to the board of directors of Akam Ata Anzali Free Zone Company called AKAM ATA. Akam Ata is an international marketing and trade, export and import, business management consulting service provider with a team of business consultants in Iran. Yasha Sazmand, MBA is the Founder, CEO and a board member of Akam Ata.

== Honours ==
- Hazfi Cup: 1987, 1990–91; runner-up: 1987–88, 1988–89, 1991–92
- Azadegan League: runner-up: 2003
