= Naghsh-e Jahan Stadium =

Stadium in Isfahan, Iran

Naghsh-e-Jahan Stadium
- Naghsh-e-Jahan
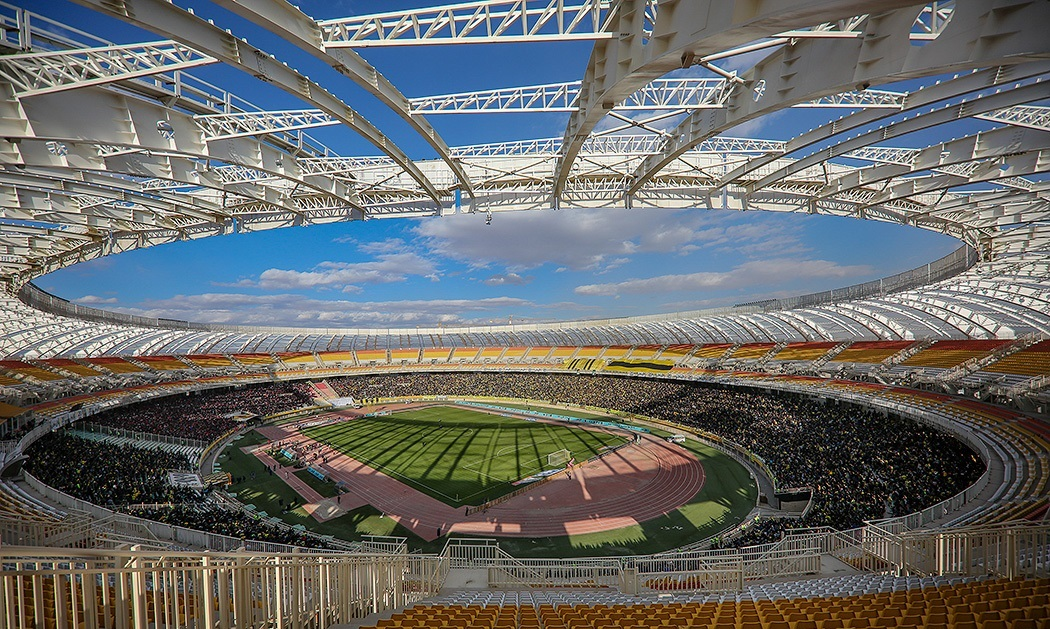
- Naghsh Jahan Stadium
- Interactive map of Naghsh-e-Jahan Stadium
- Full name: Naghsh-e-Jahan Stadium
- Location: Isfahan, Iran
- Owner: Mobarakeh Steel Company
- Operator: Sepahan
- Capacity: 75,000
- Surface: Grass
- Record attendance: 70,000; Sepahan vs. Malavan (24 April 2023, Persian Gulf Pro League)
- Field size: 105 × 68 metres

Construction
- Groundbreaking: 1997
- Built: 1999–2003
- Opened: 11 February 2003; 2 November 2016 (reopening)
- Expanded: 5 July 2010 – 31 October 2016
- Closed: 2007
- Cost: 250 million R (2003); 6 billion R (for expansion)
- Architect: Kang Cheol-Nam
- General contractor: Tekfen Construction and Installation

Tenant
- Sepahan (2003–2007, 2016–present)

Naghsh-e-Jahan Stadium (Persian: ورزشگاه نقش‌ جهان, Varzešgâh-è Naqš-è Jahân, meaning Image of the World Stadium, named after Naqsh-e Jahan Square), is a football stadium in Isfahan, Iran. It has been the home stadium of Sepahan between its completion in 2003 and 2007, and again since its reopening in 2016. With a current seating capacity of 75,000 it is the second largest stadium in Iran.

It has hosted four Hazfi Cup finals in 2004, 2006, 2007 and 2021.

== Attendance record ==
The following table lists twelve matches with the most attendance at Naghsh-e-Jahan Stadium (more than 35,000 attendances).

#	Date	Home team	Score	Away team	Attendance
1	24 April 2023	Sepahan (Iran)	1–1	(Iran) Malavan	70,000
2	15 February 2024	Sepahan (Iran)	1–3	(Saudi Arabia) Al-Hilal	61,265
3	12 April 2019	Sepahan (Iran)	0–1	(Iran) Esteghlal	60,000
3	17 February 2023	Sepahan (Iran)	2–0	(Russia) Zenit	60,000
3	15 April 2023	Sepahan (Iran)	2–0	(Iran) Mes Rafsanjan	60,000
3	12 November 2023	Sepahan (Iran)	1–0	(Iran) Persepolis	60,000
7	12 May 2023	Sepahan (Iran)	5–0	(Iran) Paykan	55,000
7	23 August 2023	Sepahan (Iran)	1–0	(Iran) Esteghlal	55,000
9	9 December 2018	Sepahan (Iran)	1–1	(Iran) Persepolis	50,000
10	30 November 2019	Sepahan (Iran)	2–2	(Iran) Esteghlal	44,000
11	21 September 2017	Sepahan (Iran)	2–2	(Iran) Persepolis	38,000
11	30 November 2018	Sepahan (Iran)	1–0	(Iran) Padideh Khorasan	38,000

== Controversies ==
On October 2, 2023, there was a controversy ahead of the scheduled match between Sepahan and Al-Ittihad in the AFC Champions League. The match was abandoned due to the visiting team's protest over the presence of a sculpture of Qasem Soleimani on the pitch. The result of the match was 3–0 to Al-Ittihad due to Sepahan's violation of the rules.

== Other facilities ==
=== Naghsh-e-Jahan Arena ===
Naghsh-e-Jahan Arena officially named 25 Aban Arena is an indoor sports arena in Isfahan. The stadium has a seating capacity of 6,000. It is mainly used for volleyball, futsal and wrestling. The arena hosted the 2015 AFC Futsal Club Championship and 2017 World Men's Greco-Roman Wrestling Clubs' Cup.

== See also ==
- Sepahan S.C.
- Naghsh-e-Jahan square
- Naghsh-e-Jahan derby
