= 1982 Vahdat International Cup =

1982 Vahdat International Tournament
Vahdat Cup

Tournament details
- Host country: Iran
- Dates: ? February – 27 February
- Teams: 8 (from 2 confederations)
- Venue(s): 1 (in 1 host cities)

Final positions
- Champions: (Iran) Persepolis (1st title)
- Runners-up: Algeria Army XI
- Third place: (Iran) Malavan

Vahdat International Cup (Persian: جام بین المللی وحدت) was an international football tournament hosted by Iran that was played at Tehran in February 1982. This tournament's participants were teams from Iran and friend countries such as Algeria, Syria and Libya. Eight teams from four countries (Iran, Syria, Algeria, and Libya) participated, with Iran having five teams and the other three nations having one each. The Iranian teams and the Syria Army XI belonged to AFC, with Algeria Army XI and Libya Army XI belonging to CAF. The games were all played at one venue, the Shahid Shiroudi Stadium, with a capacity of 30,000 at the time.

== Participants ==
Eight teams participated in this tournament:

(Iran) Persepolis	AFC
(Iran) Esteghlal	AFC
(Iran) Malavan	AFC
Iran U23	AFC
Iran Army XI	AFC
Syria Army XI	AFC
Algeria Army XI	CAF
Libya Army XI	CAF

== Venue ==
Tehran
Shahid Shiroudi Stadium
Capacity: 30,000

== Results ==
Known results are as follows:

=== Group stage ===
==== Group 1 ====
Team	Pts	Pld	W	D	L	GF	GA	GD
Algeria Army XI	?	3	?	?	?	?	?	?
Syria Army XI	?	3	?	?	?	?	?	?
Iran U23	?	3	?	?	?	?	?	?
(Iran) Esteghlal	?	3	?	?	?	?	?	?

==== Group 2 ====
Team	Pts	Pld	W	D	L	GF	GA	GD
(Iran) Persepolis	5	3	2	1	0	5	2	+3
(Iran) Malavan	?	3	?	?	?	?	?	?
Iran Army XI	?	3	?	?	?	?	?	?
Libya Army XI	?	3	?	?	?	?	?	?

(Iran) Persepolis	4-2	Libya Army XI

Shahid Shiroudi Stadium

(Iran) Persepolis	1-0	Iran Army XI

Shahid Shiroudi Stadium

(Iran) Persepolis	0-0	(Iran) Malavan

Shahid Shiroudi Stadium

=== Semi finals ===
February 22, 1982

(Iran) Persepolis	1-0	Syria Army XI

Shahid Shiroudi Stadium

Algeria Army XI	? (won in penalties)	(Iran) Malavan

Shahid Shiroudi Stadium

=== Third-place match ===
There was no third place match, however Malavan earned third rank among all participants.

=== Final ===
February 27, 1982

(Iran) Persepolis	1-0 (AET)	Algeria Army XI
Javad Hassanzadeh 119+'

Shahid Shiroudi Stadium
Attendance: 25,000

== Squads ==
=== Persepolis ===
Persepolis squad was short of several national team and national army team players such as Mohammad Mayeli Kohan, Nasser Mohammadkhani, Abbas Kargar, Ebrahim Kian Tahmasebi, Behrouz Soltani, Mohammad Panjali and Gholamreza Fathabadi. Several players from youth team took part in this tournament.

Head coach: (Iran) Ali Parvin

No.	Pos.	Player	Date of birth (age)	Caps	Club
	GK	Vahid Ghelich	16 December 1957 (aged 24)		(Iran) Persepolis F.C.
2	DF	Hossein Kashinejad			(Iran) Persepolis F.C.
3	DF	Kazem Seyed Alikhani	13 July 1954 (aged 27)		(Iran) Persepolis F.C.
6	MF	Ali Parvin(c)	25 September 1947 (aged 34)		(Iran) Persepolis F.C.
7	MF	Rouhollah Ebadzadeh			(Iran) Persepolis F.C.
8	MF	Hamid Derakhshan	31 December 1957 (aged 24)		(Iran) Persepolis F.C.
9	MF	Zia Arabshahi	6 June 1958 (aged 23)		(Iran) Persepolis F.C.
10	FW	Nasser Nouraei	16 June 1954 (aged 27)		(Iran) Persepolis F.C.
12		Mahmoud Pazooki			(Iran) Persepolis F.C.
		Reza Riyazati			(Iran) Persepolis F.C.
		Mehdi Ghaffari			(Iran) Persepolis F.C.
		Mehdi Torabi			(Iran) Persepolis F.C.
13	MF	Majid Sabzi			(Iran) Persepolis F.C.
14	FW	Fariborz Moradi	11 April 1964 (aged 17)		(Iran) Persepolis F.C.
17		Javad Hassanzadeh			(Iran) Persepolis F.C.
