= Ali Niakani =

Iranian footballer (1951–2023)

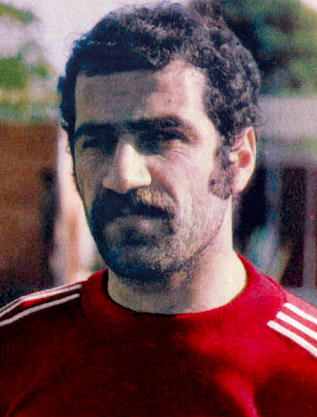
- Niakani in the 1970s

Personal information
- Date of birth: 8 January 1951
- Place of birth: Bandar-e Anzali, Iran
- Date of death: 9 November 2023 (aged 72)
- Position: Forward

Senior career*
Years	Team	Apps	(Gls)
1973–1979	Malavan		
- * Club domestic league appearances and goals

Ali Niakani (Persian: علی نیاکانی; 8 January 1951 – 9 November 2023) was an Iranian footballer who played as a forward.

== Early life ==
Niakani was born in Bandar-e Anzali on 8 January 1951.

== Club career ==
He spent his entire career with Malavan, winning the 1975–76 Hazfi Cup with them. He also played two matches with Malavan that represented Iran at the tournament under the country's name at the 1974 RCD Cup.

== Death ==
Niakani died on 9 November 2023, at the age of 72.
