= Jalal Rafkhaei =

Iranian footballer

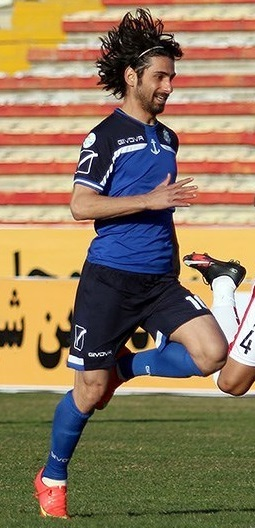
- Rafkhaei in 2016

Personal information
- Full name: Seyed Jalal Rafkhaei
- Date of birth: 24 April 1984 (age 42)
- Place of birth: Bandar-e Anzali, Iran
- Height: 1.82 m (6 ft 0 in)
- Position: Striker

Youth career
- 2003–2006: Malavan

Senior career*
Years	Team	Apps	(Gls)
2005–2010	Malavan	147	(27)
2010–2011	Zob Ahan	25	(5)
2011–2016	Malavan	136	(48)
2016	Machine Sazi	3	(1)
2016–2017	Khooneh Be Khooneh	17	(1)
2017	Aluminium Arak	0	(0)
2021	Malavan	2	(1)

International career^{‡}
2008–2013	Iran	12	(2)

Managerial career
- 2020–: Malavan (assistant)
- * Club domestic league appearances and goals as of 12 March 2021 ‡ National team caps and goals as of 26 March 2013

Seyed Jalal Rafkhaei (Persian: سید جلال رافخایی, born 24 April 1984) is an Iranian football player.

== Club career statistics ==
He is a Malavan youth system product and played with the senior team for five years then transferred to Zob Ahan and after one season he returned to his hometown club. He became top scorer of 2012–13 season with 19 goals.

- Last Update: 4 June 2019

Club performance			League		Cup		Continental		Total	
Season	Club	League	Apps	Goals	Apps	Goals	Apps	Goals	Apps	Goals
Iran			League		Hazfi Cup		Asia		Total	
2005–06	Malavan	Pro League	28	0	0	0	—		28	0
2006–07	Malavan	Pro League	28	3	0	0	—		28	3
2007–08	Malavan	Pro League	30	8	0	0	—		30	8
2008–09	Malavan	Pro League	30	11	2	0	—		32	11
2009–10	Malavan	Pro League	31	5	2	0	—		33	5
2010–11	Zob Ahan	Pro League	26	4	1	0	7	0	34	4
2011–12	Malavan	Pro League	31	8	1	0	—		32	8
2012–13	Malavan	Pro League	31	19	1	0	—		32	19
2013–14	Malavan	Pro League	23	9	1	0	—		24	9
2014–15	Malavan	Pro League	22	6	0	0	—		22	6
2015–16	Malavan	Pro League	25	5	2	1	—		27	6
2016–17	Machine Sazi	Pro League	3	1	0	0	—		3	1
2016–17	Khooneh Be Khooneh	Azadegan League	15	1	2	0	—		17	1
2017–18	Aluminium Arak	Azadegan League	0	0	0	0	—		0	0
2020-21	Malavan	Azadegan League	1	0	1	1	—		2	1
Career total			324	80	13	2	7	0	343	82

- Assist Goals

Season	Team	Assists
07/08	Malavan	1
08/09	Malavan	1
09/10	Malavan	1
10/11	Zob Ahan	0
11/12	Malavan	1
12/13	Malavan	2
13/14	Malavan	3
14/15	Malavan	1

== International career ==
In 2008, he was called for the Iran national football team by the Iran's coach Ali Daei. Rafkhaei debuted for Iran versus Palestine on August 7, 2008.

=== International goals ===
Scores and results list Iran's goal tally first.

#	Date	Venue	Opponent	Score	Result	Competition
1	7 August 2008	Takhti Stadium, Tehran	Palestine	3–0	3–0	WAFF 2008
2	11 August 2008	Takhti Stadium, Tehran	Qatar	5–1	6–1	WAFF 2008

== Honours ==
Country

- WAFF Championship
  - Winner (1): 2008

Individual

- Iran Pro League Top Goalscorer (19 goals): 2012–13
- Iran Pro League Golden Boot (1): 2012–13
