= 2005 Hazfi Cup final =

- Event: 2004-05 Hazfi Cup
Aboomoslem	Saba Battery
2	2
- Saba Battery won 4–2 on penalties

First leg
Aboomoslem	Saba Battery
1	1
- Date: July 12, 2005
- Venue: Saba City Stadium, Tehran
- Referee: Hatam bakpour
- Attendance: 12,000

Second leg
Saba Battery	Aboomoslem
1	1
- Date: July 15, 2005
- Venue: Samen Al-Aeme Stadium, Mashhad
- Referee: Masoud Moradi
- Attendance: 35,000

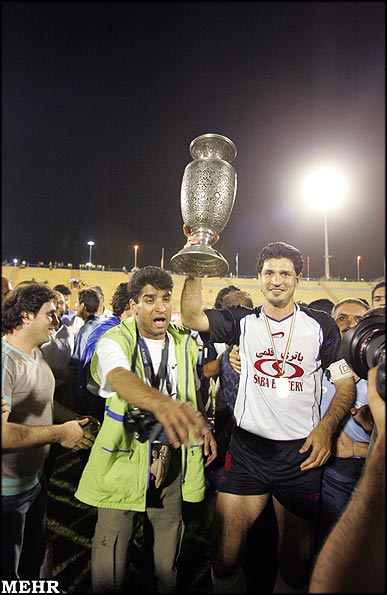
Saba Battery with the trophy

The 2005 Hazfi Cup final was a two-legged football tie in order to determine the 2004–05 Hazfi Cup champion of Iranian football clubs. Aboomoslem faced Saba in this final game.. The first leg took place on July 12, 2005 at Saba City Stadium in Tehran and the second leg took place on July 15, 2005 at Samen Al-Aeme Stadium, Mashhad.

== Format ==
The rules for the final were exactly the same as the one in the previous knockout rounds. The tie was contested over two legs with away goals deciding the winner if the two teams were level on goals after the second leg. If the teams could still not be separated at that stage, then extra time would have been played with a penalty shootout (taking place if the teams were still level after extra time).

== Route to the final ==
Saba				Round	Aboomoslem
Opponent	Result	H/A	Saba goalscorers	Second stage	Opponent	Result	H/A	Aboomoslem goalscorers
?	?	?	?	1/16 Final	?	?	?	?
Malavan	1–0	H	?	1/8 Final	Persepolis	1–0	A	?
PAS Tehran	4–2	H	?	Quarter-Final	Paykan	1–0	H	?
Esteghlal Ahvaz	4–4 (6-5)	H	?	Semi-Final	Saba Batri	0–0 (6-7)	A	?

== Final Summary ==
Team 1	Agg.	Team 2	1st leg	2nd leg
Saba	2-2	Aboomoslem	1-1	1-1

=== First leg ===
July 12, 2005

Saba	1 – 1	Aboomoslem
Daghighi 38'		Kahaltabri 82'

Saba City Stadium, Tehran
Attendance: 12,000
Referee: Hatam bakpour

=== Second leg ===
July 15, 2005

Aboomoslem	1 – 1	Saba
Fazli 47'	Report	Markosi 86'
Penalties
Jabbari (penalty scored); Teymourian (penalty scored); Fazli (penalty missed); Nasehi (penalty missed)	2 - 4	Daei (penalty scored); Bakhtiarizadeh (penalty scored); Navazi (penalty scored); Daghighi (penalty scored)

Samen Al-Aeme Stadium, Mashhad
Attendance: 35,000
Referee: Masoud Moradi

== Champions ==
Champions 2004–05 Hazfi Cup
Saba Battery
First title

== See also ==
- 2004–05 Iran Pro League
- 2004–05 Azadegan League
- 2004–05 Iran Football's 2nd Division
- 2004–05 Iran Football's 3rd Division
- 2004–05 Hazfi Cup
- 2004–05 Iranian Futsal Super League
- Iranian Super Cup
