= 1972–73 Iran 2nd Division =

Iran Football's 2nd Division
- Season: 1972–73
- Champions: Taj Ahvaz

The following are the standings of the Iran Football's 2nd Division 1972–73 football season. In 1973 the Taj Ahvaz was promoted to the Takht Jamshid Cup, but league rules allowed for only one team of the same name to participate, therefore Taj Tehran, remained in the league, and Taj Ahvaz F.C. was forced to stay in the lower division.

Taj Ahvaz won the 2nd Division championship this season.

== League standings ==
=== Group A ===
Pos	Team	Pld	W	D	L	GF	GA	GD	Pts	Qualification
1	Taj Abadan	3	2	1	0	4	0	+4	5	Semifinals
2	Jam Abadan	3	1	2	0	1	0	+1	4	Semifinals
3	Persepolis Sanandaj	3	0	2	1	2	3	−1	2	
4	Pas Shiraz	3	0	1	2	6	2	+4	1	

=== Group B ===
Pos	Team	Pld	W	D	L	GF	GA	GD	Pts	Qualification
1	Malavan	3	2	1	0	10	2	+8	5	Semifinals
2	Taj Ahvaz	3	2	1	0	3	1	+2	5	Semifinals
3	Persepolis Isfahan	3	1	0	2	3	8	−5	2	
4	Tractor Sazi	3	0	0	3	1	6	−5	0	

=== Semifinals ===
Taj Ahvaz	4–0	Taj Abadan

Jam Abadan	1–0	Malavan

=== Final ===
Taj Ahvaz	3–0	Jam Abadan

- Taj Ahvaz Promoted 1973–74 Takht Jamshid Cup

=== Third place play-off ===
Taj Abadan	0–1	Malavan

== See also ==
- 1973–74 Takht Jamshid Cup
