= 1991–92 Azadegan League =

1st season of Azadegan League

Azadegan League
- Season: 1991–92
- Champions: PAS Tehran
- Relegated: Sepahan; Est. Rasht
- Asian Club Championship: PAS Tehran
- Asian Winners' Cup: Persepolis
- Matches: 132
- Goals: 260 (1.97 per match)
- Top goalscorer: Farshad Pious (11)

The 1991–92 Azadegan League was the first season of the Azadegan League, which was at the time the top-level league of professional football in Iran. The 1991–92 league was won by PAS Tehran.

== League Table ==
Pos	Team	Pld	W	D	L	GF	GA	GD	Pts	Qualification or relegation
1	PAS Tehran (C)	22	14	6	2	32	11	+21	34	Qualification for the 1992–93 Asian Club Championship
2	Esteghlal	22	12	8	2	30	15	+15	32	
3	Persepolis	22	13	5	4	30	12	+18	31	Qualification for the 1992–93 Asian Cup Winners' Cup
4	Malavan	22	9	8	5	21	11	+10	26	
5	Jonoob Ahvaz	22	7	8	7	25	26	−1	22	
6	Sepahan (R)	22	9	4	9	20	30	−10	22	Relegated to 2nd Division
7	Nassaji Mazandaran	22	6	8	8	16	22	−6	20	
8	Esteghlal Ahvaz	22	6	7	9	25	23	+2	19	
9	Koma Shiraz	22	4	9	9	9	21	−12	17	
10	Tractor Sazi	22	5	6	11	25	32	−7	16	
11	Esteghlal Rasht (R)	22	4	7	11	13	21	−8	15	Relegated to 2nd Division
12	Aboomoslem	22	3	4	15	14	36	−22	10	

(C) Champions; (R) Relegated
- Azadegan League champions: Pas Tehran
- Relegated: Sepahan, Esteghlal Rasht
- Promoted: Keshavarz, Sanat Naft, Vahdat Sari, Bargh Shiraz, Polyacryl, Sepidrood Rasht

== Top goal scorer ==
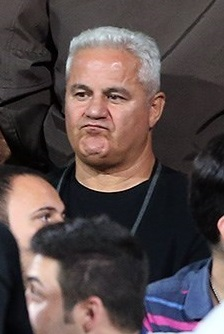
Farshad Pious

Farshad Pious (Persepolis) (11 goals)
