= Ghafour Jahani =

Iranian football coach and former player

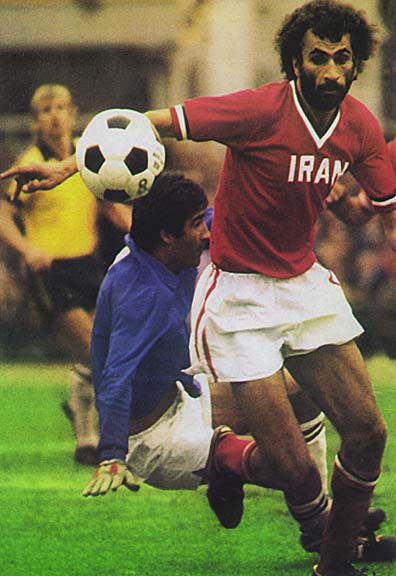

Personal information
- Date of birth: 19 June 1951 (age 75)
- Place of birth: Bandar Anzali, Iran
- Height: 1.80 m (5 ft 11 in)
- Position: Striker

Senior career*
Years	Team	Apps	(Gls)
1969–1979	Malavan		

International career
1974–1978	Iran	30	(7)

Managerial career
- 1992–1997: Chooka Talesh
- * Club domestic league appearances and goals

Ghafour Jahani (born 19 June 1951 in Bandar Anzali, Iran) is an Iranian football coach and former player.

== Club career ==
Jahani mostly played for Malavan. At the age of 17, he was selected for the Gilan High school team, and joined Malavan upon the team formation in 1969.

He was one of the key players of Malavan reaching the third place in the Iranian Takht Jamshid in 1978. 1974 and 1977 he was the second best scorer of the Iranian league. He also won the Iranian Cup – Hazfi Cup – in 1976. He also played two matches with Malavan that represented Iran at the tournament under the country's name at the 1974 RCD Cup.

== International career ==
Jahani was a member of the Iran national team winning the football tournament of the Asian Games in Tehran in 1974 as well as participating in 1976 Olympics in Montreal, when Iran reached the quarterfinals of the Asian Cup 1976 in Tehran. He also played two games for Iran in the 1978 World Cup.

Jahani scored 4 goals during the 1978 world cup qualifications' campaign, one of them was the winning goal against Australia in Tehran which qualified Iran for the 1978 World Cup in Argentina.
