= 2017 Hazfi Cup final =

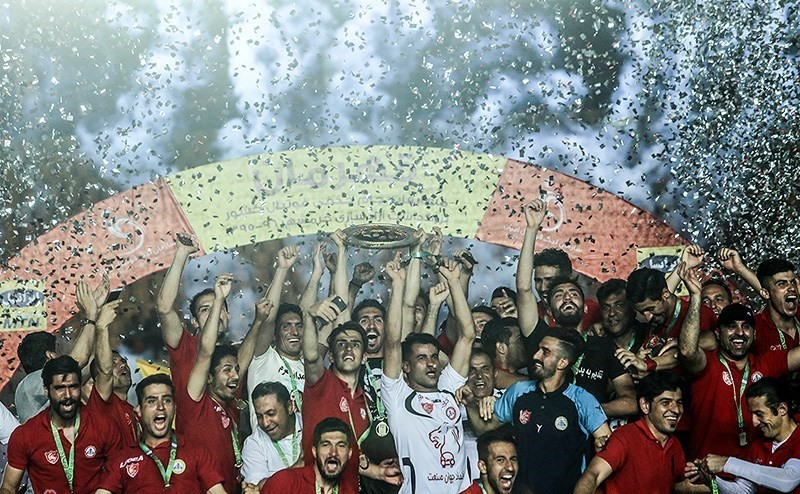
- Event: 2016–17 Hazfi Cup
Tractor Sazi	Naft Tehran
0	1
- Date: 11 May 2017
- Venue: Khorramshahr Stadium, Khorramshahr
- Man of the Match: Sajjad Shahbazzadeh
- Referee: Alborz Hajipour
- Attendance: 8,521
- Weather: Clear; 32 °C (90 °F); 21% humidity

The 2017 Hazfi Cup final was the 30th final of the Hazfi Cup since its inauguration in 1975. It was contested by Tractor S.C. and Naft Tehran F.C. The winner would proceed to the AFC Champions League group stage, and the runner-up would move into the play-offs.

== Format ==
The rules for the final were exactly the same as the one for the previous knockout rounds. The tie was contested over two halves, with away goals deciding the winner if the two teams were level on goals after the second half. If the teams tied, then extra time would have been played. If the teams were still tied after the extra time, a penalty shootout would follow. Since the 2011–12 season, the final has always held as a single match.

== Match History ==
This was Tractor Sazi's fourth Hazfi final and Naft Tehran's second appearance in the final match of the tournament. Tractor Sazi had last won the cup in 2013–14, and were 2-time runners-up in 1976 and 1995. Naft Tehran appeared in the final in 2015 and lost to Zob Ahan.

== Details ==
11 May 2017
18:30 (UTC+4:30)

Tractor Sazi	0 – 1	Naft Tehran
		Shahbazzadeh 88'

Khorramshahr Stadium, Khorramshahr
Attendance: 8,521
Referee: Alborz Hajipour
