= Farhad Pourgholami =

Iranian footballer and manager

Personal information
- Full name: Farhad Pourgholami
- Date of birth: December 4, 1962 (age 63)
- Place of birth: Bandar-e Anzali, Iran
- Position: Midfielder

Youth career
- 1980–1983: Malavan

Senior career*
Years	Team	Apps	(Gls)
1983–1998	Malavan	240	(1)

Managerial career
- 2005–2006: Iran U-20 (assistant)
- 2006–2010: Malavan B
- 2007–2010: Malavan (assistant)
- 2010–2012: Malavan
- 2013–2014: Tractor (assistant)
- 2014–2016: Saipa (assistant)
- 2016–2017: Paykan (assistant)
- 2017–2018: Iran U-20
- 2018: Malavan
- * Club domestic league appearances and goals

Farhad Pourgholami (born December 4, 1962, in Bandar Anzali) is an Iranian football manager and former player.

Pourgholami was assistant head coach to Mohammad Ahmadzadeh in Iran national under-20 football team. After Ahmadzadeh was appointed as Malavan's head coach, Pourgholami was chosen as his first team coach. Later he was appointed as Malavan Youth team. After Ahmadzadeh's resignation as Malavan head coach, he was appointed as caretaker head coach and after three weeks, he was signed a contract until the end of 2011–12 season.

== Honors ==
=== Player ===
- Hazfi Cup

Winners (2): 1987, 1990
Runner Up (3): 1988, 1989, 1991

==== Manager ====
- Hazfi Cup

Runner Up (1): 2010–11
