= 2004 Hazfi Cup final =

- Event: 2003-04 Hazfi Cup
Sepahan	Esteghlal
5	2

First leg
Sepahan	Esteghlal
3	2
- Date: July 8, 2004
- Venue: Naghsh Jahan Stadium, Esfahan
- Attendance: 30,000

Second leg
Esteghlal	Sepahan
0	2
- Date: July 15, 2004
- Venue: Azadi Stadium, Tehran
- Referee: Masoud Moradi
- Attendance: 85,000

The 2004 Hazfi Cup final was a two-legged football tie in order to determine the 2003–04 Hazfi Cup champion of Iranian football clubs. Sepahan faced Esteghlal in this final game. The first leg took place on July 8, 2004 at Naghsh Jahan Stadium in Esfahan and the second leg on July 15, 2004 at Azadi Stadium, Tehran.

== Format ==
The rules for the final were exactly the same as the one in the previous knockout rounds. The tie was contested over two legs with away goals deciding the winner if the two teams were level on goals after the second leg. If the teams could still not be separated at that stage, then extra time would have been played (with a penalty shootout taking place if the teams were still level after extra time).

== Route to the final ==
Esteghlal				Round	Sepahan
Opponent	Result	H/A	Esteghlal goalscorers	Second stage	Opponent	Result	H/A	Sepahan goalscorers
?	?	?	?	1/16 Final	?	?	?	?
?	?	?	?	1/8 Final	?	?	?	?
?	?	?	?	Quarter-Final	?	?	?	?
Saipa	2–1	?	Alireza Vahedi Nikbakht, Yadollah Akbari	Semi-Final	Zob Ahan	1–1 (5-3)	?	Rasoul Khatibi

== Final Summary ==
Team 1	Agg.	Team 2	1st leg	2nd leg
Sepahan	5-2	Esteghlal	3-2	2-0

=== First leg ===
July 08, 2004

Sepahan	3-2	Esteghlal
Stepanyan 21'; Khormagah OG'; Hashemi 90'		Akbari; Enayati

Esfahan, Naghsh Jahan Stadium
Attendance: 30,000

=== Second leg ===
July 15, 2004

Esteghlal	0-2	Sepahan
		Seyed-Salehi 25', 68'

Tehran, Azadi Stadium
Attendance: 85,000
Referee: Masoud Moradi

== Champions ==
Champions 2003–04 Hazfi Cup
Sepahan
First title

== See also ==
- Iran Pro League 2003–04
- 2003–04 Azadegan League
- 2003–04 Iran Football's 2nd Division
- 2003–04 Iran Football's 3rd Division
- 2003–04 Hazfi Cup
- 2003–04 Iranian Futsal Super League
- Iranian Super Cup
