= 1994–95 Asian Cup Winners' Cup =

Tournament details
- Dates: 25 July 1994 – 22 January 1995
- Teams: 20

Final positions
- Champions: (Japan) Yokohama Flügels (1st title)
- Runners-up: (United Arab Emirates) Al Shaab
- Third place: (Saudi Arabia) Al Ittihad
- Fourth place: Telephone Org. Thailand

Tournament statistics
- Best player: (United Arab Emirates) Adnan Al Talyani

The 1994–95 Asian Cup Winners' Cup was the fifth edition of association football competition run by the Asian Football Confederation specifically for its members cup holders.

== Preliminary round ==
=== Central Asia ===
| Team | Pld | W | D | L | GF | GA | GD | Pts |
|---|---|---|---|---|---|---|---|---|
| (Kazakhstan) Taraz Club Dzhambul | 4 | 4 | 0 | 0 | 27 | 3 | +24 | 12 |
| (Uzbekistan) Pakhtakor Tashkent | 4 | 3 | 0 | 1 | 19 | 4 | +15 | 9 |
| (Turkmenistan) Merw Mary | 4 | 2 | 0 | 2 | 5 | 13 | −8 | 6 |
| (Tajikistan) Ravshan Kulob | 4 | 1 | 0 | 3 | 3 | 19 | −16 | 3 |
| (Kyrgyzstan) Alay Osh | 4 | 0 | 0 | 4 | 3 | 18 | −15 | 0 |

| 25 July 1994 | Ravshan Kulob | 0–10 | Pakhtakor Tashkent | Dzhambul, Kazakhstan |
| 25 July 1994 | Taraz Club Dzhambul | 8–1 | Alay Osh | Dzhambul, Kazakhstan |
| 27 July 1994 | Alay Osh | 1–3 | Merw Mary | Dzhambul, Kazakhstan |
| 27 July 1994 | Taraz Club Dzhambul | 3–0 | Pakhtakor Tashkent | Dzhambul, Kazakhstan |
| 29 July 1994 | Pakhtakor Tashkent | 5–1 | Alay Osh | Dzhambul, Kazakhstan |
| 29 July 1994 | Merw Mary | 1–0 | Ravshan Kulob | Dzhambul, Kazakhstan |
| 31 July 1994 | Pakhtakor Tashkent | 4–0 | Merw Mary | Dzhambul, Kazakhstan |
| 31 July 1994 | Taraz Club Dzhambul | 8–1 | Ravshan Kulob | Dzhambul, Kazakhstan |
| 2 August 1994 | Alay Osh | 0–2 | Ravshan Kulob | Dzhambul, Kazakhstan |
| 2 August 1994 | Merw Mary | 1–8 | Taraz Club Dzhambul | Dzhambul, Kazakhstan |

=== East Asia ===
| Team | Pld | W | D | L | GF | GA | GD | Pts |
|---|---|---|---|---|---|---|---|---|
| (Sri Lanka) Renown SC | 1 | 1 | 0 | 0 | 2 | 1 | +1 | 2 (Note: missing one result (Renown won or drew and won the group)) |
| (India) East Bengal | 2 | 1 | 0 | 1 | 5 | 2 | +3 | 2 |
| (Maldives) Club Lagoons | 1 | 0 | 0 | 1 | 0 | 4 | −4 | 0 |

Source: RSSSF
Notes:

Pakistan representatives withdrew

| 3 August 1994 | Renown SC | unk | Club Lagoons | Colombo, Sri Lanka |
| 5 August 1994 | East Bengal | 4–0 | Club Lagoons | Colombo, Sri Lanka |
| 7 August 1994 | Renown SC | 2–1 | East Bengal | Colombo, Sri Lanka |

== First round ==
=== West Asia ===
| Team 1 | Agg. | Team 2 | 1st leg | 2nd leg |
|---|---|---|---|---|
| Al Qadisiya (Kuwait) | 2–1 | (Oman) Al-Oruba | 2–0 | 0–1 |
| Al Faisaly (Jordan) | (w/o)^{1} | (Yemen) Al Tilal | | |
| Muharraq (Bahrain) | bye | | | |
| Al Ittihad (Saudi Arabia) | bye | | | |
| Al Sadd (Qatar) | bye | | | |
| Al Bourj (Lebanon) | bye | | | |
| Al Shaab (United Arab Emirates) | bye | | | |
| Jonoob Ahvaz^{2} (Iran) | bye | | | |
| Taraz Club Dzhambul (Kazakhstan) | bye | | | |

^{1} Al Tilal withdrew
^{2} Jonoob Ahvaz also listed as Abva Khak Djonoob and Navard Loleh, both referring to sponsor names

=== East Asia ===
| Team 1 | Agg. | Team 2 | 1st leg | 2nd leg |
|---|---|---|---|---|
| Telephone Org. Thailand | (w/o)^{1} | (India) East Bengal | 4–1 | |
| Kuala Lumpur FA (Malaysia) | 7–1 | Royal Brunei Armed Forces Sports Council | 5–1 | 2–0 |
| Renown SC^{2} (Sri Lanka) | bye | | | |
| Instant Dict (Hong Kong) | bye | | | |
| Gelora Dewata (Indonesia) | bye | | | |
| Quang Nam Danang (Vietnam) | bye | | | |
| Yokohama Flügels (Japan) | bye | | | |

^{1} East Bengal withdrew after 1st leg
^{2} Sri Lanka representatives also listed as Ratnam SC

== Second round ==
=== West Asia ===
| Team 1 | Agg. | Team 2 | 1st leg | 2nd leg |
|---|---|---|---|---|
| Muharraq (Bahrain) | 2–6 | (Saudi Arabia) Al Ittihad | 1–3 | 1–3 |
| Al Sadd (Qatar) | (w/o)^{1} | (Kuwait) Al Qadisiya | 2–0 | |
| Al Bourj (Lebanon) | 1–5 | (United Arab Emirates) Al Shaab | 0–1 | 1–4 |
| Jonoob Ahvaz (Iran) | 1–1 (5–4p) | (Kazakhstan) Taraz Club Dzhambul | 1–0 | 0–1 |

^{1} Al Qadisiya withdrew after 1st leg

=== East Asia ===
| Team 1 | Agg. | Team 2 | 1st leg | 2nd leg |
|---|---|---|---|---|
| Renown SC (Sri Lanka) | 0–6 | (Hong Kong) Instant Dict | 0–2 | 0–4 |
| Kuala Lumpur FA (Malaysia) | ^{1} | (Indonesia) Gelora Dewata | 2–1 | 0–2 |
| Telephone Org. Thailand | 8–2 | (Vietnam) Quang Nam Danang | 5–2 | 3–0 |
| Yokohama Flügels (Japan) | bye^{2} | | | |

^{1} Gelora Dewata disqualified due to fielding two ineligible players
^{2} apparently East Bengal withdrew

== Quarterfinals ==
=== West Asia ===
| Team 1 | Agg. | Team 2 | 1st leg | 2nd leg |
|---|---|---|---|---|
| Al Ittihad (Saudi Arabia) | 2–0 | (Qatar) Al Sadd | 0–0 | 2–0 |
| Al Shaab (United Arab Emirates) | 1–1 (a) | (Iran) Jonoob Ahvaz | 0–0 | 1–1 |

=== East Asia ===
| Team 1 | Agg. | Team 2 | 1st leg | 2nd leg |
|---|---|---|---|---|
| Instant Dict (Hong Kong) | 3–4 | (Japan) Yokohama Flügels | 2–1 | 1–3 |
| Telephone Org. Thailand | 5–3 (aet) | (Malaysia) Kuala Lumpur FA | 2–1 | 3–2 |

== Semifinals ==
20 January 1995

| Yokohama Flügels (Japan) | 4–2 | Telephone Org. Thailand |

Sharjah, UAE
20 January 1995

| Al Shaab (United Arab Emirates) | 1–1 (a.e.t.) | (Saudi Arabia) Al Ittihad |
Penalties
| | 4–3 |

Khalid Bin Mohammed Stadium, Sharjah

== Third place match ==
22 January 1995

| Al Ittihad (Saudi Arabia) | 1–1 (a.e.t.) | Telephone Org. Thailand |
|---|---|---|
| Jabarti 75' | | Saychon Panfak 86' |
Penalties
| | 4–2 |

Sharjah, UAE

== Final ==
22 January 1995

| Yokohama Flügels (Japan) | 2–1 (a.e.t.) | (United Arab Emirates) Al Shaab |
|---|---|---|
| Watanabe 37', 95' | | Keita 74' |

Khalid Bin Mohammed Stadium, Sharjah
Referee: Abbas Dashti (Kuwait)
