= Fariborz Moradi =

Iranian footballer

Personal information
- Full name: Fariborz Moradi
- Date of birth: 11 April 1964
- Place of birth: Tehran, Iran
- Date of death: 27 April 2008 (aged 44)
- Place of death: Tehran, Iran
- Position: Right back

Senior career*
Years	Team	Apps	(Gls)
1981–1992	Persepolis	113	(0)
1993–1995	Keshavarz		

International career
1989	Iran	1	(0)
- * Club domestic league appearances and goals

Fariborz Moradi was an Iranian footballer who played as a midfielder for Persepolis and the Iran national football team.
