= Gilan Province League =

Football league of Iran

- Country: Iran
- Confederation: AFC
- Number of clubs: 14
- Level on pyramid: 5
- Promotion to: 3rd Division
- Relegation to: Gilan Province league 2
- Domestic cup: Hazfi Cup
- Current champions: Pas Gilan
- Broadcaster(s): IRIB

Gilan Provincial League is the premier football league of Gilan Province, Iran and is 5th in the Iranian football pyramid after the 3rd Division. It is part of the Vision Asia program.

== League Champions ==
- 2008–09: Malavan Sepid Anzali
- 2009–10: Sobhan Rasht
- 2010–11: Shahrdari Chaboksar
- 2012–13: Shahrdari Kelachay
- 2013–14: Shahrdari Fouman
- 2014–15: Shahrdari Roudsar
- 2015–16: Sobhan Rasht
- 2016–17: Pas Gilan
- 2017–18: Shahrdari Astara
- 2018–19: Moghavemat Astara
- 2019–20: Sardar Jangal
- 2020–21: Malavan B Anzali

== Teams ==
List of teams competing in the 2017–18 season.

- Malavan Novin
- Malavan Javan Rasht
- Esteghlal Rasht
- Mahtab Shahft
- Mirza Kochak Sowme'eh Sara
- Chay Nategh Lahijan
- Dokhaniat Rasht
- Kadous Masal
- Sardar Jangal Sowme'eh Sara
- Shahin Anzali
- Shahrdari Astara
- Shahrdari Kelachay
- Shahrdari Kouchesfehan
- Shahrdari Rezvanshahr
