= 2000–01 Hazfi Cup =

Tournament details
- Country: Iran

Final positions
- Champions: Fajr Sepasi
- Runners-up: Zob Ahan

The 2000–01 Hazfi Cup was the 14th season of the Iranian football knockout competition. The tournament is organised annually by the Football Federation Islamic Republic of Iran.

== Final ==
July 08, 2001 First leg	Zob Ahan	0–1	Fajr Sepasi	Isfahan, Foolad Shahr Stadium
			Esmaili 72'	Attendance: 8,000; Referee: Farajollah Yasrebi

July 15, 2001 Second leg	Fajr Sepasi	2–1	Zob Ahan	Shiraz, Hafezieh Stadium
	Esmaili 13'; Vaziri 47'		Mohammadvand 85'	Attendance: 5,000; Referee: Gholamali Hamirad
