= Arvandan Stadium =

Football stadium in Khorramshahr, Iran

- Interactive map of Arvandan Stadium
- Full name: Naft o Gaz Arvandan Khoramshar Stadium
- Location: Khorramshahr, Khuzestan province, Iran
- Coordinates: 30.4738°N 48.1763°E
- Capacity: 15,000
- Surface: Grass

Construction
- Built: 2011–2015
- Opened: 2016

The Arvandan Stadium (Persian: ورزشگاه نفت و گاز اروندان) is a stadium in Khorramshahr, Iran. It is currently used for football matches.

The stadium, whose construction began in October 2011, was inaugurated on June 2, 2016, and has hosted the 2015–16, 2016–17, and 2017–18 Hazfi cup finals.
