= Fereydoun Asgharzadeh =

Iranian football manager

Managerial career
- Years: Team
- 1985–1986: Iran

Fereydoun Asgharzadeh was an Iranian football coach who managed the national team at the 1986 Fajr International Tournament.
