= Taj Abadan F.C. =

Taj Abadan S.C.
- Full name: Taj Abadan Sport Club
- Dissolved: 1979
- Owner: Taj sports and cultural organization

Taj Abadan S.C. was a sport club based in Abadan city in Khuzestan province, southern Iran. Taj was Abadan branch of Taj sports and cultural organization. After the Iranian revolution in 1979 Taj Abadan was dissolved.

== History ==
=== Football ===
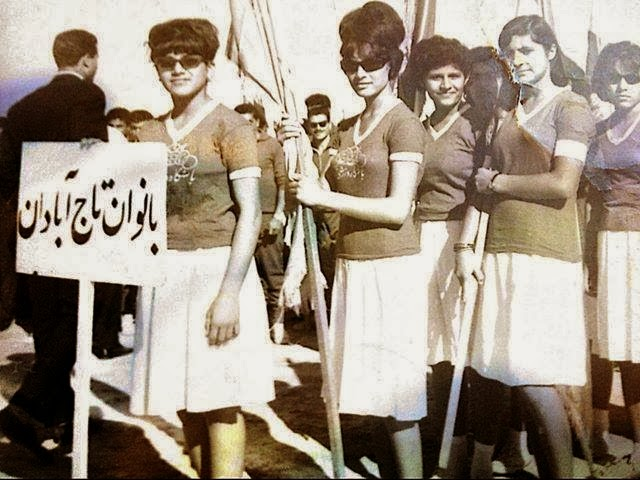
Taj Abadan ladies

Taj Abadan participated in 1970 Iran Local Cup and made to the final four but lost semi final to Pas and managed to secure third place in their only appearance in Iranian league.

One of the well-known supporters of Taj Abadan was Crown Prince Reza Pahlavi.

== Dissolution ==
In 1979 Taj Abadan was dissolved, as one of the results of Iranian revolution.

== See also ==
- Esteghlal F.C.
- Esteghlal Ahvaz F.C.
