= 1976 Hazfi Cup =

1976 Hazfi Cup (Pahlavi Cup)
Tournament details
- Country: Iran
- Dates: 14 April – 22 December 1976
- Teams: 32

Final positions
- Champions: Malavan (1st title)

Tournament statistics
- Matches played: 31
- Goals scored: 90 (2.9 per match)

The 1976 Hazfi Cup was the first staging of Iran's football knockout competition. The tournament is organised annually by the Football Federation Islamic Republic of Iran.

== Round of 32 ==
The first round was played between 15 and 18 April.

Home team	Score	Away team
Rah Ahan Tehran	3–2	Banke Meli Tehran
Homa Tehran	2–0	Iran Jandir Arak
Shahbaz Tehran	12–0	Sana'ati Behshahr
Sepahan Isfahan	1–0	Aboomoslem Mashhad
Gomrok Ahwaz	2–0	Bank Sepah Tehran
Ararat Tehran	0–0 (2–4(p))	Bargh Shiraz
Zob Ahan Isfahan	2–1	Daraei F.C Tehran
Sanaye Electronic Shiraz	2–2 (4–5(p))	Mashin Sazi F.C Tabriz
SepidRood Rasht	1–1 (5–6(p))	Teractor Sazi Tabriz
Malavan F.C	2–1	Niroo Ahwaz
PAS Tehran	2–0	Persepoolis Tehran
Bootan Tehran	0–1	Giv Bandar Pahlavi
Rastakhiz Khoramshahr	6–0	Atash Neshani Kermanshah
Sanat Naft Abadan	3–0	Bandar Abadan
Arsham Kerman	0–2	Khaneh Javanan Sari
Taj Club Tehran	1–1 (4–5(p))	Tehran Javan

== Quarterfinals ==
Home team	Score	Away team
Malavan	2–1	Shahbaz Tehran
Rastakhiz	1–0	Machine Sazi
Rah Ahan	0–1	Pas Tehran
Javanan Sari	1–4	Tractor

== Semifinals ==
Home team	Score	Away team
Rastakhiz	2–3	Malavan
Tractor	1–1 (5–3(p))	Pas Tehran

== Final ==
23 December

Malavan	4–1	Tractor
Espandar 79', 90'; Niakani 80', 86'		Zadeh 89'

Tehran, Amjadieh Stadium
Attendance: 15,000
Referee: Mohammad Salehi
