= Rastakhiz F.C. =

Dissolved football club based in Khorramshahr, Iran

Rastakhiz Football Club
- Full name: Rastakhiz Khorramshahr Football Club
- Founded: 1976
- Dissolved: 1979
- Ground: Khorramshahr, Iran
- Owner: Mohammad Youneszadeh
- League: Takht Jamshid Cup

Rastakhiz Khorramshahr Football Club (Persian: رستاخیز خرمشهر) was a team based in Khorramshahr, Iran that competed in the Takht Jamshid Cup until the team was disbanded in 1979.
