= Bahman Salehnia =

Iranian football manager (1939–2025)

Personal information
- Full name: Naghi Salehnia
- Date of birth: 11 March 1939
- Place of birth: Bandar-e Anzali, Iran
- Date of death: 30 April 2025 (aged 86)
- Position: Defender

Youth career
- Shahin

Senior career*
Years	Team	Apps	(Gls)
1969–1975	Malavan		

Managerial career
- 1969–1998: Malavan
- 1974: Iran (assistant coach)
- 1993: Iran U20
- 1998: Mes Kerman
- 1999: Chooka Talesh
- 2002–2004: Malavan
- * Club domestic league appearances and goals

Naghi Salehnia, commonly known as Bahman Salehnia (Persian: بهمن صالح‌نیا; 11 March 1939 – 30 April 2025), was an Iranian football player and coach. He is best known as the founder of Malavan F.C., one of Iran's most successful football clubs. He served as the club’s founding player cum coach until retiring as a player in 1975, and continued as head coach until 1998. Under his leadership, Malavan became one of the country's leading clubs outside Tehran, winning multiple Hazfi Cup titles. He also served as an assistant coach of the Iran national football team and later managed the Iran under-20 national team.

== Early life and education ==
Salehnia was born on 11 March 1939 in Bandar Anzali, Iran. He attended Parvin School, Sanai School, and Daryabeigi High School before earning admission to the Tehran Physical Education Teachers College. During his studies, he trained with Shahin F.C..

After graduating, Salehnia returned to Bandar Anzali as a physical education teacher while coaching local school and representative teams.

== Career ==
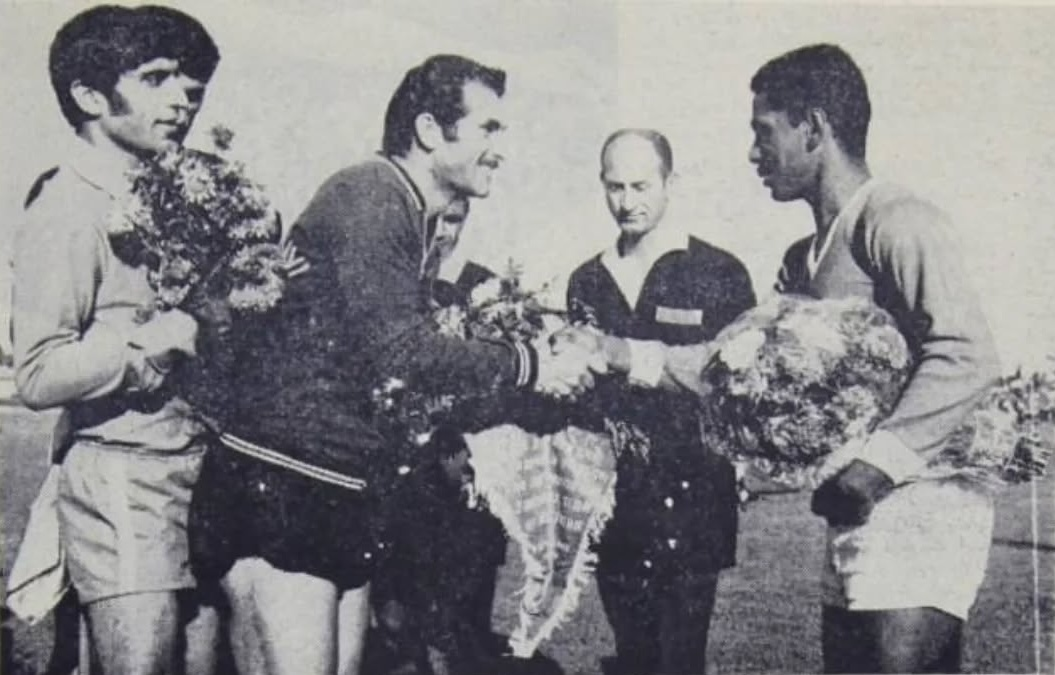
Salehnia (left) captaining Malavan during a friendly match against the Pakistan national team in 1970

In 1969, while serving as the sports supervisor for schools in Bandar Anzali, Salehnia gathered a group of local young players and established a football team that was later supported by the Iranian Navy. The club initially competed as the Anzali Navy Team before adopting the name Malavan after qualifying for the inaugural 1973–74 Takht Jamshid Cup. He represented the team both as player and coach in its early years. He captained and played two matches with Malavan that represented Iran at the tournament under the country's name at the 1974 RCD Cup under Scottish head coach Danny McLennan, playing against the Pakistan and Turkey national teams. He retired as player in 1975.

Salehnia remained in charge until 1998 as Malavan head coach, making him one of the longest-serving managers in Iranian football history. He guided Malavan to several titles, including Hazfi Cup victories.

Following a training session observed by Iran national team manager Frank O'Farrell, several Malavan players received international call-ups for the 1974 Asian Games, while Salehnia joined the national team's coaching staff as an assistant.

Following the 1979 Iranian Revolution, Salehnia temporarily left Malavan but later returned. During the 1980s and early 1990s, he helped the team develop players such as Sirous Ghayeghran, and led Malavan to further domestic success and appearances in Asian club competitions.

Later, in 1993, he was appointed head coach of the Iran under-20 national team.

After Malavan's relegation from the top division in the late 1990s, Salehnia left the club and managed Mes Kerman before taking charge of Chooka Talesh. He later resumed his association with Malavan in various coaching and advisory capacities.

== Death ==
Salehnia died on 30 April 2025, at the age of 86.

== Honours ==
=== Malavan ===
- Hazfi Cup: 1975–76, 1986–87, 1990–91
