= Jonoob Ahvaz F.C. =

Iranian football club

Jonoob Ahvaz
- Full name: Navard o Looleh Jonoob Ahvaz Football Club
- Founded: 1973
- Dissolved: 1996
- Ground: Takhti Stadium; Ahvaz
- Capacity: 15,000
- League: Azadegan League
Home colours	Away colours

Jonoob Ahvaz Football Club (Persian: باشگاه فوتبال جنوب اهواز) was an Iranian football club based in Ahvaz, Iran. The club was founded in 1973 and it was one of the most well-known clubs of Khuzestan in the early 1990s. Jonoob Ahvaz F.C. participated in the highest division of Iranian football league during the 1990s and was among the top clubs of the national league for 6 consecutive years.

Jonoob made it to the Hazfi Cup final match in the season 1993–94 but was defeated by Saipa F.C. in the final. In the following years they were given a slot from Iranian football federation to attend in 1994–95 Asian Cup Winners' Cup. Jonoob was eliminated in the quarter final stage in the tournament.

During the mid-1990s the club encountered financial problems and lack of financial resources made the club relegated to Iran Football's 2nd Division. Consequently, in 1996, their right to participate in Iran Football's 2nd Division was taken over by Foolad Khuzestan F.C. and the club was dissolved.
