= Iranian Hazfi Cup =

Iranian association football tournament

Hazfi Cup
- Organiser(s): Iran Football League Organization
- Founded: 1976; 50 years ago (as Pahlavi Cup)
- Region: Iran
- Teams: 32
- Qualifier for: AFC Champions League Two
- Domestic cup: Iranian Super Cup
- Current champions: Esteghlal (8th title)
- Most championships: Esteghlal (8 titles)
- Broadcaster: IRIB TV3 IRIB Varzesh Jame Jam TV IRIB Provincial Channels
- Website: hazfi-cup.com persianleague.com
- 2026–27 Hazfi Cup

Hazfi Cup (Persian: جام حذفی, romanized: Jām-e Hazfi, lit. 'knockout cup') formerly known as Pahlavi Cup (Persian: جام پهلوی, romanized: Jām-e Pahlavi) is an Iranian knockout football competition organized annually by the Football Federation Islamic Republic of Iran.

The Iranian football league was not held during the 1980s, hence the winner of Hazfi Cup represented Iran in the Asian Club Championship. After the revival of the league system, the champion of Iranian league qualified for Asian Club Championship and the winner of Hazfi Cup for Asian Cup Winners' Cup. The Asian Cup Winners' Cup merged with the Asian Champions Cup in 2002–03 to form the AFC Champions League and Iran was initially given two (and later four) slots in this competition. The FFIRI decided to award one of Iran's AFC Champions League spots to the winner of the Hazfi Cup, and since then, the winners of Hazfi Cup have always been allocated a spot in the AFC Champions League. Since 2024 and with the rebranding of the Asian club competitions, the FFIRI decided to send the winner of the Hazfi Cup to the AFC Champions League Elite Qualifying play-off.

The competition was founded in 1976 as Pahlavi Cup but after the revolution continued as Hazfi Cup. Esteghlal is the most successful club with eight titles.

== Alternative names ==
The Iranian Hazfi Cup has been referred to by various official, historical, alternative, and abbreviated names.

=== Official and common names ===
- Hazfi Cup
- Iranian Hazfi Cup
- Iran Hazfi Cup
- Hazfi Cup of Iran
- Iran National Cup
- Iranian National Cup
- Iran Football Cup
- Iranian Football Cup
- Iran Knockout Cup
- Iranian Knockout Cup
- Iran Domestic Cup
- Iranian Domestic Cup

=== Abbreviations and short names ===
- IHC – Iranian Hazfi Cup
- HC – Hazfi Cup
- Hazfi Cup
- Iran Cup
- Iranian Cup

=== Historical and former names ===
- Pahlavi Cup
- Jam-e Pahlavi
- Pahlavi Football Cup
- Iran Pahlavi Cup
- National Football Cup of Iran

=== Alternative search names ===
- Hazfi Cup Iran
- Iran Football Federation Cup
- Iranian Football Federation Cup
- Iran FA Cup
- Iranian FA Cup
- Iran Knockout Football Competition
- Persian Hazfi Cup
- Jam-e Hazfi
- Jame Hazfi
- Jām-e Hazfi
- Iranian National Football Cup

=== Historical context ===
The competition was established in 1976 as the Pahlavi Cup. Following the Iranian Revolution, it continued under the name Hazfi Cup and became the main domestic knockout football competition in Iran.

== Format ==
The rules for the final were exactly the same as the one for the previous knockout rounds. The tie was contested over two legs with away goals deciding the winner if the two teams were level on goals after the second leg. If the teams could still not be separated at that stage, then extra time would have been played with a penalty shootout (taking place if the teams were still level after that). Since the 2011–12 season, the final is always held as a single match.

== Finals ==
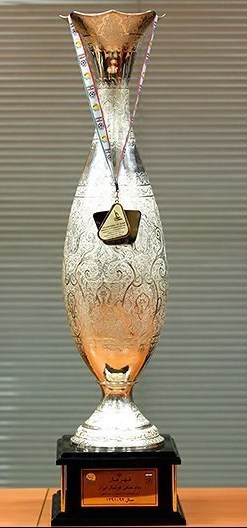
The Trophy from 2011 to 2015

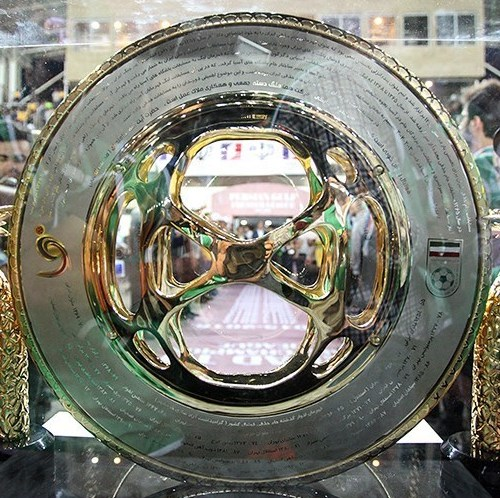
The Trophy from 2016 to present

Key

Qualified to the AFC Champions League Elite, and predecessor competitions.
Qualified to the Asian Cup Winners' Cup.

Year	Winners	Scores	Runners-up	Venue
1976	Malavan (1)	4–1	Tractor	Amjadieh Stadium, Tehran
1977–78	Taj (1)	2–0	Homa	Amjadieh Stadium, Tehran
1979–1985	Not held due to Iranian revolution and Iran–Iraq War			
1986	Malavan (2)	2–0	Kheybar	Shahid Shiroudi Stadium, Tehran
1987	Persepolis (1)	1–0	Malavan	Azadi Stadium, Tehran
1987	Persepolis (1)	0–0	Malavan	Azadi Stadium, Tehran
1987	Persepolis won 1–0 on aggregate			
1988–89	Shahin Ahvaz (1)	1–3	Malavan	Takhti Stadium, Bandar-e Anzali
1988–89	Shahin Ahvaz (1)	4–0	Malavan	Takhti Stadium, Ahvaz
1988–89	Shahin Ahvaz won 5–3 on aggregate			
1989–90	Not held			
1990–91	Malavan (3)	1–1 (a.e.t.) (6–5 pen.)	Esteghlal	Azadi Stadium, Tehran
1991–92	Persepolis (2)	2–1	Malavan	Azadi Stadium, Tehran
1992–93	Not held			
1993–94	Saipa (1)	0–0	Jonoob	Azadi Stadium, Tehran
1993–94	Saipa (1)	1–1	Jonoob	Takhti Stadium, Ahvaz
1993–94	Saipa won 1–1 on aggregate on away goal			
1994–95	Bahman (1)	0–1	Tractor	Takhti Stadium, Tabriz
1994–95	Bahman (1)	2–0	Tractor	Ekbatan Stadium, Tehran
1994–95	Bahman won 2–1 on aggregate			
1995–96	Esteghlal (2) (Note: Taj changed its name to Esteghlal in 1979.)	3–1	Bargh	Hafezieh Stadium, Shiraz
1995–96	Esteghlal (2)	2–0	Bargh	Azadi Stadium, Tehran
1995–96	Esteghlal won 5–1 on aggregate			
1996–97	Bargh (1)	3–3 (a.e.t.) (3–0 pen.)	Bahman	Azadi Stadium, Tehran
1997–98	Not held			
1998–99	Persepolis (3)	2–1	Esteghlal	Azadi Stadium, Tehran
1999–00	Esteghlal (3)	3–1	Bahman	Azadi Stadium, Tehran
2000–01	Fajr Sepasi (1)	1–0	Zob Ahan	Foolad Shahr Stadium, Fuladshahr
2000–01	Fajr Sepasi (1)	2–1	Zob Ahan	Hafezieh Stadium, Shiraz
2000–01	Fajr Sepasi won 3–1 on aggregate			
2001–02	Esteghlal (4)	2–1	Fajr Sepasi	Hafezieh Stadium, Shiraz
2001–02	Esteghlal (4)	2–2	Fajr Sepasi	Takhti Stadium, Tehran
2001–02	Esteghlal won 4–3 on aggregate			
2002–03	Zob Ahan (1)	2–2	Fajr Sepasi	Foolad Shahr Stadium, Fuladshahr
2002–03	Zob Ahan (1)	2–2 (6–5 pen.)	Fajr Sepasi	Hafezieh Stadium, Shiraz
2002–03	Zob Ahan won 4–4 on aggregate on Penalty shootout			
2003–04	Sepahan (1)	3–2	Esteghlal	Naghsh-e-Jahan Stadium, Isfahan
2003–04	Sepahan (1)	2–0	Esteghlal	Azadi Stadium, Tehran
2003–04	Sepahan won 5–2 on aggregate			
2004–05	Saba Battery (1)	1–1	Aboomoslem	Shahid Derakhshan Stadium, Robat Karim
2004–05	Saba Battery (1)	1–1 (a.e.t.) (4–2 pen.)	Aboomoslem	Samen Stadium, Mashhad
2004–05	Saba Battery won 2–2 on aggregate on Penalty shootout			
2005–06	Sepahan (2)	1–1	Persepolis	Azadi Stadium, Tehran
2005–06	Sepahan (2)	1–1 (a.e.t.) (4–2 pen.)	Persepolis	Naghsh-e-Jahan Stadium, Isfahan
2005–06	Sepahan won 2–2 on aggregate on Penalty shootout			
2006–07	Sepahan (3)	1–0	Saba Battery	Shahid Derakhshan Stadium, Robat Karim
2006–07	Sepahan (3)	3–0	Saba Battery	Naghsh-e-Jahan Stadium, Isfahan
2006–07	Sepahan won 4–0 on aggregate			
2007–08	Esteghlal (5)	0–1	Pegah	Sardar Jangal Stadium, Rasht
2007–08	Esteghlal (5)	3–0	Pegah	Azadi Stadium, Tehran
2007–08	Esteghlal won 3–1 on aggregate			
2008–09	Zob Ahan (2)	0–1	Rah Ahan	Ekbatan Stadium, Tehran
2008–09	Zob Ahan (2)	5–1	Rah Ahan	Foolad Shahr Stadium, Fuladshahr
2008–09	Zob Ahan won 5–2 on aggregate			
2009–10	Persepolis (4)	1–0	Gostaresh Foolad	Yadegar-e Emam Stadium, Tabriz
2009–10	Persepolis (4)	3–1	Gostaresh Foolad	Azadi Stadium, Tehran
2009–10	Persepolis won 4–1 on aggregate			
2010–11	Persepolis (5)	4–2	Malavan	Azadi Stadium, Tehran
2010–11	Persepolis (5)	0–1	Malavan	Takhti Stadium, Bandar-e Anzali
2010–11	Persepolis won 4–3 on aggregate			
2011–12	Esteghlal (6)	0–0 (a.e.t.) (4–1 pen.)	Shahin Bushehr	Hafezieh Stadium, Shiraz
2012–13	Sepahan (4)	2–2 (a.e.t.) (4–2 pen.)	Persepolis	Azadi Stadium, Tehran
2013–14	Tractor (1)	1–0	Mes Kerman	Shahid Bahonar Stadium, Kerman
2014–15	Zob Ahan (3)	3–1	Naft Tehran	Takhti Stadium, Tehran
2015–16	Zob Ahan (4)	1–1 (a.e.t.) (5–4 pen.)	Esteghlal	Arvandan Stadium, Khorramshahr
2016–17	Naft Tehran (1)	1–0	Tractor	Arvandan Stadium, Khorramshahr
2017–18	Esteghlal (7)	1–0	Khooneh be Khooneh	Arvandan Stadium, Khorramshahr
2018–19	Persepolis (6)	1–0	Damash	Shohada-ye Foolad Stadium, Ahvaz
2019–20	Tractor (2)	3–2	Esteghlal	Imam Reza Stadium, Mashhad
2020–21	Foolad (1)	0–0 (a.e.t.) (4–2 pen.)	Esteghlal	Naghsh-e Jahan Stadium, Isfahan
2021–22	Nassaji (1)	1–0	Aluminium Arak	Azadi Stadium, Tehran
2022–23	Persepolis (7)	2–1	Esteghlal	Azadi Stadium, Tehran
2023–24	Sepahan (5)	2–0	Mes Rafsanjan	Azadi Stadium, Tehran
2024–25	Esteghlal (8)	1–0	Malavan	Imam Khomeini Stadium, Arak
2025–26	Cancelled.			

=== Performance by finalists ===
#	Club	Winners	Runners-up	Years won	Years runner-up
1	Esteghlal	8	7	1977, 1996, 2000, 2002, 2008, 2012, 2018, 2025	1991, 1999, 2004, 2016, 2020, 2021, 2023
2	Persepolis	7	2	1988, 1992, 1999, 2010, 2011, 2019, 2023	2006, 2013
3	Sepahan	5	–	2004, 2006, 2007, 2013, 2024	—
4	Zob Ahan	4	1	2003, 2009, 2015, 2016	2001
5	Malavan	3	5	1976, 1987, 1991	1988, 1989, 1992, 2011, 2025
6	Tractor	2	3	2014, 2020	1976, 1995, 2017
7	Bahman	1	2	1995	1997, 2000
7	Fajr Sepasi	1	2	2001	2002, 2003
9	Bargh	1	1	1997	1996
9	Saba (Note: Saba was formerly named Saba Battery in the Hazfi Cup.)	1	1	2005	2007
9	Naft Tehran	1	1	2017	2015
12	Shahin Ahvaz	1	–	1989	—
12	Saipa	1	–	1994	—
12	Foolad	1	–	2021	—
12	Nassaji	1	–	2022	—
16	Damash (Note: Damash was formerly named Pegah in the Hazfi Cup.)	–	2	—	2008, 2019
17	Homa	–	1	—	1977
17	Kheybar	–	1	—	1987
17	Jonoob	–	1	—	1994
17	Aboomoslem	–	1	—	2005
17	Rah Ahan	–	1	—	2009
17	Gostaresh Foolad	–	1	—	2010
17	Shahin Bushehr	–	1	—	2012
17	Mes Kerman	–	1	—	2014
17	Khooneh be Khooneh	–	1	—	2018
17	Aluminium Arak	–	1	—	2022
17	Mes Rafsanjan	–	1	—	2024

== Statistics ==
=== Winners by Province ===
Province	Winners	Clubs
Tehran	19	Esteghal (8), Persepolis (7), Bahman (Note: Bahman held its home matches in Karaj. Before the formation of Alborz province in 2010, Karaj was one of the cities of Tehran province; Therefore, Bahman team was one of the representatives of Tehran province during the championship.) (1), Saba (Note: Saba Battery moved to Qom (Capital of Qom province) in 2008 and its name was changed to Saba. however Saba team was one of the representatives of Tehran city and province during the championship.) (1), Naft Tehran (1), Saipa (1)
Isfahan	9	Sepahan (5), Zob Ahan (4)
Gilan	3	Malavan (3)
East Azerbaijan	2	Tractor (2)
Fars	2	Fajr Sepasi (1), Bargh (1)
Khuzestan	2	Shahin Ahvaz (1), Foolad (1)
Mazandaran	1	Nassaji (1)

=== Winners by City ===
City	Winners	Clubs
Tehran	18	Esteghal (8), Persepolis (7), Saba (1), Naft Tehran (1), Saipa (1)
Isfahan	9	Sepahan (5), Zob Ahan (4)
Bandar-e Anzali	3	Malavan (3)
Tabriz	2	Tractor (2)
Shiraz	2	Fajr Sepasi (1), Bargh (1)
Ahvaz	2	Shahin Ahvaz (1), Foolad (1)
Karaj	1	Bahman (1)
Qaemshahr	1	Nassaji (1)

== Topscorers ==
=== Per season ===
Year	Player	Goals	Club
1976-77	(Iran) Gholamhossein Mazloumi	7	Shahin Tehran
1991-92	(Iran) Farshad Pious	8	Persepolis
2005–06	(Iran) Mehrzad Madanchi	7	Persepolis
2006–07			
2007–08	(Iran) Arash Borhani	4	Esteghlal
2008–09	(Iran) Arash Borhani	5	Esteghlal
2009–10	(Iran) Mohammad Ghazi (Iran) Mehdi Seyed-Salehi (Iran) Mohsen Khalili	4	Zob Ahan; Esteghlal; Persepolis
2010–11			
2011–12			
2012–13	(Iran) Mohammad Nouri	5	Persepolis
2013–14			
2014–15	(Iran) Mehdi Rajabzadeh	4	Zob Ahan
2015–16	(Iran) Alimohammad Cheraghi (Iran) Sajjad Shahbazzadeh (Iran) Issa Alekasir	4	Shahrdari Mashhad; Esteghlal; Naft Tehran
2016–17	(Iran) Mohammad Ghazi	6	Naft Tehran
2017–18	(Iran) Sajjad Feizollahi (Iran) Mehdi Sharifi	5	Iranjavan Bushehr; Persepolis
2018–19			
2019–20	(Iran) Alimohammad Cheraghi	5	Shahrdari Mahshahr
2020–21			
2021–22			
2022–23	(Georgia (country)) Giorgi Gvelesiani	4	Persepolis
2023–24	(Iran) Issa Alekasir	3	Sepahan
2024–25	(Iran) Ahmadi Tifkan (Iran) Salman Bahrani (Iran) Hadi Dehghani	3	Shahrdari Bandar Abbas; Shahrdari Nowshahr; Foolad Hormozgan

=== All-time scorers ===
Rank	Player	Goals
1	(Iran) Farshad Pious	23
2	(Iran) Mohammad Nouri	18
-	(Iran) Arash Borhani	18
4	(Iran) Gholamreza Enayati	16
5	(Iran) Issa Alekasir	15
6	(Iran) Alireza Vahedi Nikbakht	14
-	(Iran) Mohammad Ahmadzadeh	14

== See also ==
- IPL
- Azadegan League
- Iran Football's 2nd Division
- Iran Football's 3rd Division
- Iranian Super Cup
- Iranian Futsal Super League
- Iran Futsal's 1st Division
- List of Hazfi Cup winning managers
