= Mohammad Ahmadzadeh =

Iranian football player and coach

Personal information
- Date of birth: January 10, 1961 (age 65)
- Place of birth: Bandar-e Anzali, Iran
- Position: Midfielder

Youth career
- 1975–1978: Malavan

Senior career*
Years	Team	Apps	(Gls)
1978–1981	Malavan		
1981–1982	Tehran Javan		
1985–1991	Malavan		
1991–1993	Bank Tejarat		

International career
1978–1980	Iran U20		
1988–1990	Iran	4	(0)

Managerial career
- 1993–1994: Bank Tejarat (Youth)
- 1995–1996: Malavan (Assistant)
- 1996: Iran U20 (Assistant)
- 1997: Mes Kerman (Assistant)
- 1998–1999: Shahrdari Some'e Sara
- 2000–2002: Malavan
- 2003: Iran U23 (Assistant)
- 2003–2004: Bargh Shiraz
- 2005–2006: Iran U20
- 2008: Iran (Assistant)
- 2006–2010: Malavan
- 2010: Esteghlal Ahvaz
- 2010: Moghavemat Sepasi
- 2010: Paykan
- 2012–2013: Malavan
- 2013–2014: Gahar Zagros
- 2015: Ararat Kurdistan
- 2015–2016: Shahrdari Ardabil
- 2016: Malavan
- 2016–2017: Shahin Bushehr
- 2018–2020: Malavan
- * Club domestic league appearances and goals

Mohammad Ahmadzadeh (Persian: محمد احمدزاده, born January 10, 1961, in Bandar-e Anzali) is an Iranian former football, basketball and tennis player and current football coach.

He played most of his career for Malavan and is also the team's head coach for the third time, serving the last term for several seasons. Ahmadzadeh changed from football to basketball and tennis from 1982 to 1985. On 9 March 2008, Ahmadzadeh was appointed assistant coach of the Iran national football team under newly appointed head coach, Ali Daei.

Ahmadzadeh won the Qods League Forward of the Season in the 1989–90 season after scoring 16 goals for Malavan.
