= Malavan F.C. =

Malavan ملوان
- Full name: Malavan Bandar Anzali Football Club
- Nicknames: Ghou-ye Sepid (The White Swan); Malavānān (The Sailors)
- Short name: Malavan
- Founded: 1969; 57 years ago
- Ground: Ghayeghran Stadium
- Capacity: 9,000
- Chairman: Ashkan Pourrashid
- Manager: Maziar Zare
- League: Persian Gulf Pro League
- 2025–26: Persian Gulf Pro League, 10th of 16
- Website: http://malavanfc.com
Home colours	Away colours

Malavan Bandar Anzali Football Club (Persian: باشگاه فوتبال ملوان بندر انزلى, Bāšgāh-e Futbāl-e Malavān-e Bandar-e Anzali) is an Iranian football club based in Bandar-e Anzali, Iran. It won Iran's second league, the Azadegan League and came back to Persian Gulf Pro League after being relegated in the 2015–16 season. The team is known for having some of the most passionate fans in Iranian football, and is one of the country's most successful teams based outside Tehran. It is one of the most successful Iranian teams in the Hazfi Cup, reaching the final 7 times and winning 3 titles.

The club forms the football part of the multisport Malavan Sport and Cultural Club. Malavan was previously owned by the Iranian Navy.

== History ==
=== Establishment ===
Bahman Salehnia created the team in 1968 along with some young athletes from the port city of Anzali. After some time, the Iranian Navy decided to become the team's main sponsor and owner.

=== Early years ===
Malavan competed in the 1972–73 Iran 2nd Division, advancing through regional stages before finishing third in the four-team final round behind Taj Ahvaz and Taj Abadan. The two clubs above Malavan did not enter the inaugural 1973–74 Takht Jamshid Cup after the Iranian Football Federation prohibited identically named clubs from competing alongside Taj Tehran, and Malavan was included among the new league's participants. Before the club entered the Takht Jamshid Cup, the names Artemis, Malavan and Bayandor were considered. Malavan was ultimately chosen, and the club was renamed Malavan Bandar Pahlavi.

Following the club's fifth-place finish in the inaugural 1973–74 Takht Jamshid Cup, where it was the highest-placed club from outside Tehran, the Iranian Football Federation selected the Malavan squad to represent Iran at the 1974 RCD Cup in Pakistan. The selection was made in recognition of the club's performance during its debut national league campaign. Managed officially by Iran national coach Danny McLennan, with Bahman Salehnia serving as captain and player, the team finished as runners-up after defeating Pakistan 2–1 and losing 1–0 to Turkey.

Following the 1979 Iranian Revolution and the restoration of the city's former name, Bandar-e Anzali, the team’s name was renamed as Malavan Bandar Anzali.

The club finished third in the 1977 and 1989 editions of the Takht Jamshid Cup. Malavan has won the Hazfi Cup on 3 occasions. In 1986 Malavan participated in Asian Club Championship but after beating Saunders SC in first round they withdrew from tournament due to the Iran–Iraq War.

=== Iran Pro League ===
In 2003 Malavan was relegated to the Azadegan League, they stayed one year in the lower league before they were immediately promoted back to the Iran Pro League. They finished 12th in the 2008–09 and 2009–10 season. In 2010–11 season they finished 8th and reached the final of Hazfi Cup but lost to Persepolis. In the 2013–14 Iran Pro League season Malavan achieved a 7th-place finish in the league.

=== Relegation ===
In July 2015 Malavan hired famous Iranian coach Amir Ghalenoi who had won several league titles with Esteghlal and Sepahan. Player such as Arash Afshin, Hossein Mahini and Shahab Karami joined the squad to serve their conscription period. In Ghalenoi's first game in charge, Malavan defeated the Hazfi Cup holders, Zob Ahan 1–0. After only three games Ghalenoi left the club and was replaced by former Persepolis manager Hamid Estili.

On 13 May 2016 after a 2–0 loss to Siah Jamegan, who were behind Malavan before the match started, the clubs was relegated to the Azadegan League for the second time in their history.

Before the start of the 2016–17 season it was announced that controversial manager Mohammad Mayeli Kohan had been named Malavan's manager. Despite achieving good results and being in or near a promotion spot the entire season, Mayeli Kohan was involved in several confrontations with the supporters, which led to many supporters boycotting the team's games.

=== Return to Pro League with Zare ===
2020-2021 season marked the return of two retired homegrown players, Maziar Zare and Pejman Nouri, the former as the new head coach and the latter as the general manager of the club. In his first season, Zare lead the team to the semi-final of the domestic cup, despite failing to win promotion. In the 2021-2022 season, Zare led the team back to the Pro League by winning the Azadegan League with record points, marking the return of Malavan to the top flight after six years.

== El Gilano ==
The match between Malavan and Damash or Sepidrood is known as the Gilan Derby or El Gilano. This match is one of Iran's most important and heated derby's. Malavan hold the record for most wins in the derby with four since the start of the Iran Pro League in 2001. Malavan also holds the largest margin of victory when they defeated Damash 3–0 in 2005 and again in 2013. The derby is also known for its fan violence.

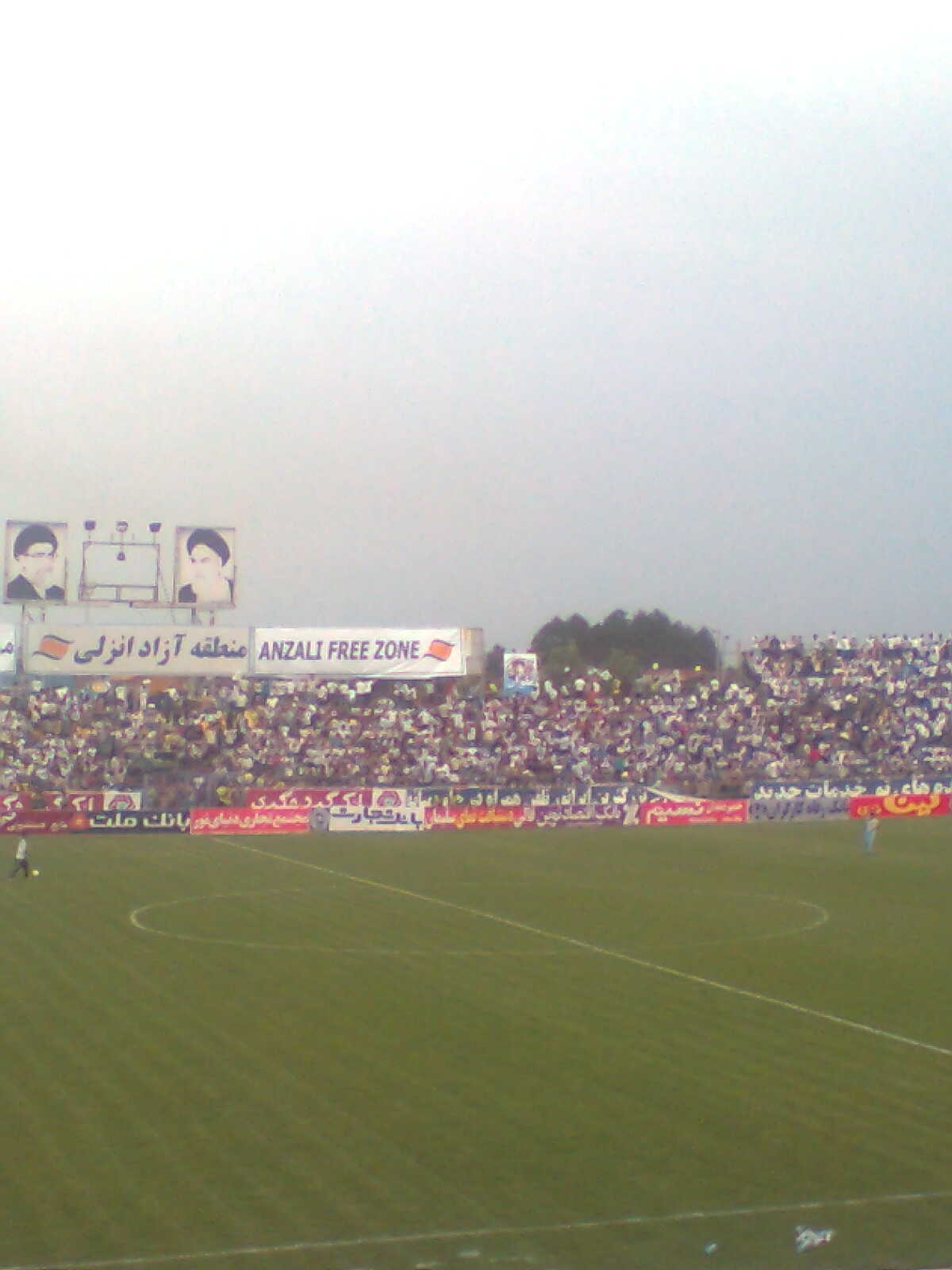
Fans of Malavan in play of Malavan & Esteghlal semi-final in 2010–11 Hazfi Cup

== Season-by-season ==
The table below chronicles the achievements of Malavan in various competitions since the beginning of Iranian Pro league in 2001.

Year	Division	Position	Hazfi Cup
2001–02	Pro League	12th	Quarter-finals
2002–03	Pro League	14th	Round of 16
2003–04	Azadegan League	2nd	Quarter-finals
2004–05	Pro League	7th	Quarter-finals
2005–06	Pro League	11th	Quarter-finals
2006–07	Pro League	14th	Quarter-finals
2007–08	Pro League	16th	Round of 16
2008–09	Pro League	12th	Quarter-finals
2009–10	Pro League	12th	Quarter-finals
2010–11	Pro League	8th	Final
2011–12	Pro League	15th	Fourth Round
2012–13	Pro League	13th	Round of 16
2013–14	Pro League	7th	Quarter-finals
2014–15	Pro League	13th	Round of 16
2015–16	Pro League	14th	Quarter-finals
2016–17	Azadegan League	4th	Quarter-finals
2017–18	Azadegan League	6th	Quarter-finals
2018–19	Azadegan League	11th	Fourth Round
2019–20	Azadegan League	15th	Third Round
2020–21	Azadegan League	11th	Semi-finals
2021–22	Azadegan League	1st	Third Round
2022–23	Pro League	12th	Round of 16

For details on seasons, see List of Malavan F.C. seasons

== Honours ==
=== National titles ===
- Azadegan League
  - Winners (1): 2021–22
  - Runner-up (1): 2003–04
- Hazfi Cup
  - Winners (3): 1975–76, 1986–87, 1990–91
  - Runner-up (5): 1987–88, 1988–89, 1991–92, 2010–11, 2024–25

=== Minor titles ===
- (Iran) Vahdat Cup
  - Third place (1): 1982
- (Pakistan) RCD Cup
  - Runner-up (1): 1974

== Club officials ==
=== Presidents ===
Name	Years
Rashid Sazmand	1996–06
Saadollah Pourtahmasbi	2006–09
Ardeshir Pournemat	2009–11
Bahman Salehnia	2011–12
Sadegh Deroudgar	2012–14
Hossein Gholami	2014–15
Ahmad Donyamali	2015–17
Mehran Nasiri	2017–18
Pejman Nouri	2019–23
Arash Fahmide	2023–present

=== Current coaching staff ===
Position	Name
Head coach	(Iran) Maziar Zare
Assistant coach	(Portugal) Eurico Pinhal
Goalkeeping coach	(Iran) Mohammad Ali Hassani Sefat
Doctor	(Iran) Babak Sayyad
Technical director	(Iran) Ghafour Jahani
Team manager	(Iran) Hossein Gholami

=== Head coaches ===
Below is a list of Malavan coaches from 1968 until the present day. Firouz Karimi carries the honor of being the first Iranian head coach to assume the title without rising from the Malavan football school.

Name	Nationality	Years
Bahman Salehnia	(Iran) (Iran)	20 May 1968 – 5 February 1997
Nosrat Irandoost	(Iran)	5 February 1997 – 15 December 2000
Mohammad Ahmadzadeh	(Iran)	15 Dec 2000 – 2 July 2002
Bahman Salehnia	(Iran)	15 May 2002 – 2 July 2004
Nosrat Irandoost	(Iran)	2 July 2004 – 5 July 2006
Mohammad Ahmadzadeh	(Iran)	5 July 2006 – 1 January 2010
Farhad Pourgholami	(Iran)	1 January 2010 – 29 September 2012
Mohammad Ahmadzadeh	(Iran)	29 September 2012 – 28 May 2013
Dragan Skočić	(Croatia)	28 May 2013 – 1 June 2014
Nosrat Irandoost	(Iran)	1 June 2014 – 8 October 2014
Stevan Mojsilović	(Serbia)	8 October 2014 – 5 December 2014
Firouz Karimi	(Iran)	6 December 2014 – 1 June 2015
Hamid Estili	(Iran)	10 August 2015 – 20 February 2016
Mohammad Ahmadzadeh	(Iran)	1 March 2016 – 15 July 2016
Mohammad Mayeli Kohan	(Iran)	22 July 2016 – 27 May 2017
Nader Dastneshan	(Iran)	28 May 2017 – 1 June 2018
Farhad Pourgholami	(Iran)	1 June 2018 – 28 October 2018
Mohammad Ahmadzadeh	(Iran)	31 October 2018 – 7 June 2020
Akbar Misaghian	(Iran)	7 June 2020 – 1 September 2020
Maziar Zare	(Iran)	1 September 2020 – 18 May 2023
Mehdi Tartar	(Iran)	26 June 2023 – present

== Players ==
=== First-team squad ===
As of 3 September 2026

Note: Flags indicate national team as defined under FIFA eligibility rules; some limited exceptions apply. Players may hold more than one non-FIFA nationality.

No.	Pos.	Nation	Player
1	GK	IRI	Pouria Zaman
4	DF	IRI	Amir Reza Afsordeh
5	DF	IRI	Zargham Saadavi ^{U21} (on loan from Esteghlal)
7	MF	IRI	Farhan Jafari ^{U21}
8	DF	IRI	Farzin Moamelegari ^{U23} (on loan from Persepolis)
10	MF	IRI	Ghaem Eslamikhah
11	MF	IRI	Mahan Sadeghi ^{U21}
12	GK	IRI	Afshar Sedaghat ^{U25}
14	DF	IRI	Mohammad Hossein Rafiei ^{U23} (on loan from Nassaji Mazandaran)
15	DF	IRI	Mohammad Reza Khosravi ^{U23}
18	MF	IRI	Vahid Asgarpour
19	MF	IRI	Mahan Beheshti ^{U17}
20	DF	IRI	Mohammad Papi
23	MF	IRI	Parham Movaghari
26	DF	IRI	Mahyar Zahmatkesh ^{INJ} (Captain)
27	MF	IRI	Erfan Shahriari ^{U25}

No.	Pos.	Nation	Player
28	MF	IRI	Amirreza Karimi ^{U17}
44	DF	IRI	Parsa Khoshannia
55	DF	IRI	Hamidreza Shamsipour ^{U21}
66	DF	IRI	Alireza Khoshkafa
69	MF	IRI	Sadegh Beyrami ^{U21}
72	FW	IRI	Reza Marzban ^{U21} (on loan from Aluminium Arak)
75	MF	IRI	Amir Mohammad Nesaei
77	MF	IRI	Behnam Barzay
78	FW	IRI	Farjad Fayaz ^{U21}
80	MF	IRI	Iliya Imani ^{U23}
81	DF	IRI	Jafar Hosseinpour
88	MF	IRI	Iliya Hosseini
90	MF	IRI	Hossein Sadeghi (vice-captain)
92	MF	IRI	Amir Hossein Amirzadeh
96	FW	IRI	Mohammadreza Abbasi
98	GK	IRI	Farzad Tayebipour
99	FW	IRI	Alireza Ramezani ^{U25}

=== Reserve Squad ===
Note: Flags indicate national team as defined under FIFA eligibility rules; some limited exceptions apply. Players may hold more than one non-FIFA nationality.

No. / Pos. / Nation / Player	No. / Pos. / Nation / Player
