= List of Rah Ahan F.C. seasons =

The list of Rah Ahan F.C. seasons lists all Iranian association football seasons in which the club Rah Ahan F.C. has participated.

== Season-by-season ==
The table below chronicles the achievements of Rah Ahan F.C. every season, from 1968 to the present day.

Season	Div.	League	Position	Hazfi Cup	Notes
1968–69	1	Tehran League	10th	Not held	
1969–70	1	Tehran League	8th	Not held	
1970–71	1	Tehran League	10th	Not held	
1973–74	1	Takht Jamshid Cup	7th	Not held	
1974–75	1	Takht Jamshid Cup	9th	Not held	
1975–76	1	Takht Jamshid Cup	15th	Quarterfinal	Relegated
1976–77	2	2nd Division	1st	1/16 Final	Promoted
1977–78	1	Takht Jamshid Cup	16th	Not held	Relegated
1978–79	2	2nd Division	N/A	Not held	League not finished
1979–80	1	Tehran League	Not held	Not held	
1980–81	1	Tehran League	Not held	Not held	
1981–82	1	Tehran League	5th	Not held	
1982–83	1	Tehran League	9th	Not held	
1983–84	1	Tehran League	10th	Not held	
1984–85	1	Tehran League	N/A	Not held	League not finished
1985–86	1	Tehran League	8th	Not held	
1986–87	1	Tehran League	6th		
1987–88	1	Tehran League	6th		
1988–89	1	Tehran League	12th		
1989–90	1	Tehran League	9th	Not held	
1990–91	1	Tehran League	17th		Relegated
1991–92	4	Tehran 2nd Division	5th		
1992–93	4	Tehran 2nd Division	2nd	Not held	Promoted
1993–94	3	Tehran League	7th		
1994–95	3	Tehran League	2nd		Promoted
1995–96	2	2nd Division	5th		
1996–97	2	2nd Division	6th		
1997–98	2	2nd Division	6th	Not held	
1998–99	2	2nd Division	4th		
1999–00	2	2nd Division	6th		
2000–01	2	2nd Division	4th		
2001–02	2	Azadegan League	8th		
2002–03	2	Azadegan League	11th		
2003–04	2	Azadegan League	11th		
2004–05	2	Azadegan League	2nd		Promoted
2005–06	1	Pro League	13th		
2006–07	1	Pro League	16th	1/16 Final	
2007–08	1	Pro League	12th	Quarterfinal	
2008–09	1	Pro League	11th	Final	
2009–10	1	Pro League	14th	1/16 Final	
2010–11	1	Pro League	15th	1/16 Final	
2011–12	1	Pro League	11th	1/16 Final	
2012–13	1	Pro League	8th	1/8 Final	
2013–14	1	Pro League	11th	1/4 Final	
2014–15	1	Iran Pro League	12th	1/8 Final	
2015–16	1	Iran Pro League	15th	1/16 Final	Relegated
2016–17	2	Azadegan League	15th	1/32 Final	
2017–18	2	Azadegan League	18th	1/32 Final	Relegated
2018–19	3	2nd Division	Did Not Participate	Did Not Participate	Relegated

=== Reserves ===
The table below shows the achievements of the club's reserve team in various competitions.

Season	League	Position	Hazfi Cup
2010–11	3rd Division	9th/Group 2	Did not qualify
2011–12	Tehran Provincial League	7th/Group 1	Did not qualify
2012–13	Tehran Provincial League	7th/Group 1	Did not qualify
2013–14	Tehran Provincial League	1st/Group 1	Did not qualify
