= All-time Azadegan League table =

Iranian sports ranking

The All-time Azadegan League table is a ranking of all Iranian football clubs based on their performance in the Azadegan League, the second highest division of professional football in Iran. It was the top-level football league in Iran from its foundation in 1991 until 2001, when the Persian Gulf Pro League was established. In this ranking, 3 points are awarded for a win, 1 for a draw, and 0 for a loss, although the Azadegan League awarded 2 points for a win until the 1995–96 season. The table that follows is accurate as of the end of the 2022–23 season. Teams in bold are part of the 2022–23 Azadegan League.

Pos.	Club	Seasons	Matches	Win	Draw	Loss	GF	GA	GD	Pts	Champions	Runners-up	Promoted	Relegated	Best Rank
1	Nassaji Mazandaran^{1}	19	494	172	152	170	526	540	−14	**665**	—	1	1	2	2nd
2	Mes Kerman	13	384	159	126	99	426	305	+121	**603**	1	1	2	—	1st
3	Sanat Naft	17	417	154	139	124	478	427	+51	**601**	—	2	4	2	2nd
4	Aluminium Arak^{2}	16	436	143	148	145	455	465	−10	**577**	—	1	1	2	2nd
5	Malavan^{3}	14	404	143	144	117	401	347	+54	**567**	1	1	2	2	1st
6	**Fajr Sepasi**	13	390	145	131	114	427	329	+98	**566**	1	—	2	—	1st
7	Tractor Sazi	16	392	143	131	118	448	414	+34	**560**	1	1	1	1	1st
8	Machine Sazi	17	463	129	146	188	470	616	−146	**533**	—	1	2	4	2nd
9	Mes Rafsanjan	13	367	133	129	105	430	344	+86	**528**	1	—	1	—	1st
10	Gol Gohar	12	333	120	121	92	399	337	+62	**481**	1	—	1	—	1st
11	Persepolis	9	222	122	71	29	368	167	+201	**437**	4	3	—	—	1st
12	Payam Mashhad^{4}	12	305	102	106	97	353	350	+3	**409**	1	—	1	3	1st
13	Esteghlal	9	224	108	77	39	328	194	+134	**401**	2	4	—	1	1st
14	PAS Tehran	10	250	94	106	50	304	227	+77	**388**	2	1	—	—	1st
15	Damash Gilan^{5}	10	263	105	73	85	290	252	+38	**388**	1	1	3	2	1st
16	Esteghlal Ahvaz	13	330	90	109	131	352	429	−77	**379**	1	—	2	3	1st
17	Iranjavan	11	300	89	103	108	317	347	−30	**370**	—	—	—	2	2nd
18	Niroye Zamini	12	300	89	92	119	283	333	−50	**359**	—	—	—	4	3rd
19	**Saipa**	9	250	83	106	61	287	244	+43	**355**	2	—	—	1	1st
20	Sepahan	9	236	87	79	70	250	230	+20	**340**	—	—	—	1	3rd
21	Rayka Babol^{9}	7	238	80	87	71	243	221	+22	**327**	—	—	—	—	5th
22	Shahid Ghandi Yazd^{6}	9	226	84	74	68	267	225	+42	**326**	1	—	1	1	1st
23	Shahrdari Tabriz^{7}	9	265	92	91	82	296	261	+35	**320**	1	—	1	5	1st
24	Bargh Shiraz	11	276	75	90	111	245	312	−67	**315**	—	—	—	2	3rd
25	Shahin Bushehr	10	260	77	80	103	229	308	−79	**311**	—	2	1	3	2nd
26	Naft Masjed Soleyman	7	208	76	79	53	248	207	+41	**307**	1	1	2	—	1st
27	Shahrdari Bandar Abbas	10	217	71	70	76	229	216	+13	**283**	—	—	—	1	2nd
28	**Esteghlal Khuzestan**	6	186	72	62	52	202	141	+61	**278**	1	1	2	—	1st
29	Rahian Kermanshah^{8}	8	197	66	76	55	191	172	+19	**274**	1	—	1	1	1st
30	Baadraan Tehran	5	166	74	51	41	214	151	+63	**273**	—	—	—	—	3rd
31	Shamoushak Noshahr	8	212	67	68	77	198	231	−33	**269**	1	—	1	2	1st
32	Aluminium Hormozgan	7	188	67	67	54	200	177	+23	**268**	—	1	1	1	2nd
33	Homa	8	194	67	64	63	195	195	0	**265**	—	—	—	1	2nd
34	Zob Ahan	7	184	60	71	53	217	204	+13	**251**	—	—	—	1	3rd
35	**Kheybar Khorramabad**	5	172	59	64	49	189	158	+31	**241**	—	—	—	1	4th
36	Shahrdari Zanjan	8	192	59	62	71	197	215	−18	**239**	—	—	—	1	5th
37	Etka Gorgan	8	185	60	57	68	196	204	−8	**237**	—	—	—	2	3rd
38	Aboomoslem	8	194	54	62	78	208	245	−37	**224**	—	—	—	3	5th
39	Foolad Yazd	7	195	51	68	76	163	206	−43	**221**	—	—	—	1	5th
40	Golreyhan Alborz^{10}	5	166	55	52	59	173	176	−3	**217**	—	—	—	1	3rd
41	**Pars Jonoubi Jam**	4	134	53	46	35	130	115	+15	**205**	1	—	1	—	1st
42	Paykan	4	110	55	35	20	157	90	+67	**200**	2	1	4	—	1st
43	**Khooshe Talaei**	4	134	49	46	39	151	125	+26	**193**	—	—	—	—	4th
44	PAS Hamedan	5	135	52	36	47	129	124	+5	**192**	—	1	—	1	3rd
45	Rah Ahan	6	176	48	48	80	165	237	−72	**192**	—	1	1	1	2nd
46	Steel Azin^{11 12}	6	146	54	41	51	181	180	+1	**191**	1	—	1	1	1st
47	**Arman Gohar Sirjan**	4	134	49	39	46	157	157	0	**186**	—	—	—	—	3rd
48	Oghab Tehran	5	124	46	39	39	151	118	+33	**177**	—	—	—	1	4th
49	Gahar Zagros^{13}	6	150	43	47	60	133	169	−36	**176**	—	—	1	1	2nd
50	Damash Tehran^{14}	5	135	41	51	43	147	149	−2	**174**	—	—	—	—	3rd
51	Bargh Tehran	5	124	45	38	41	134	120	+14	**173**	—	—	—	1	4th
52	Foolad	5	128	45	36	47	146	157	−11	**171**	—	—	1	—	1st
53	Bahman	4	114	43	41	30	151	116	+35	**170**	—	2	—	—	2nd
54	Havadar^{15}	3	98	42	32	24	135	99	+36	**168**	—	1	1	—	2nd
55	Gostaresh Foulad	4	104	44	32	28	131	111	+20	**164**	1	—	1	—	1st
56	Qashqai	4	132	41	38	53	119	140	−21	**161**	—	—	—	—	8th
57	Polyacryl Esfahan	5	132	38	44	50	129	158	−29	**158**	—	—	—	2	3rd
58	Jonoob Ahvaz	5	114	40	37	37	120	118	+2	**157**	—	—	—	1	3rd
59	Moghavemat Mersad	5	114	40	35	39	127	120	+7	**155**	—	—	—	1	4th
60	Keshavarz	5	122	34	48	40	124	115	+9	**150**	—	—	—	1	2nd
61	Zagros Yasouj^{16}	4	102	39	27	36	104	96	+8	**144**	—	—	—	1	3rd
62	Sorkhpooshan	4	86	35	29	22	107	79	+28	**134**	—	—	—	—	3rd
63	**Chooka Talesh**	5	142	30	43	69	130	229	−99	**133**	—	—	—	3	6th
64	Mes Sarcheshmeh	3	78	35	27	16	95	54	+41	**132**	1	1	2	—	1st
65	**Esteghlal Mollasani**	3	100	26	47	27	97	112	-15	**125**	—	—	—	—	8th
66	Sepidrood	4	108	31	27	50	90	131	−41	**120**	—	1	1	3	2nd
67	Sepahan Novin	3	74	33	20	21	105	80	+25	**119**	—	1	—	1	2nd
68	Saba Qom^{17}	3	94	30	29	35	110	143	−33	**119**	1	—	1	1	1st
69	**Shams Azar Qazvin**	2	66	32	18	16	104	59	+45	**114**	1	—	1	—	1st
70	Payam Mokhaberat	4	104	27	33	44	91	110	−19	**114**	—	—	—	1	8th
71	**Shahrdari Astara**	3	100	27	32	41	75	99	−24	**113**	—	—	—	—	11th
72	Navad Urmia	3	98	26	32	40	61	97	−36	**110**	—	—	—	1	7th
73	Giti Pasand	3	84	24	31	29	81	91	−10	**103**	—	—	—	1	5th
74	Kowsar Lorestan	4	94	22	30	42	86	120	−34	**96**	—	—	—	1	8th
75	Sanati Kaveh	3	78	23	25	30	78	85	−7	**94**	—	—	—	1	9th
76	Ararat Tehran	3	78	23	23	32	77	90	−13	**92**	—	—	—	2	5th
77	**Mes Shahr-e Babak**	2	66	20	31	15	54	43	+11	**91**	—	—	—	—	7th
78	Persepolis Shomal^{18}	3	76	23	20	33	74	96	−22	**89**	—	—	—	1	8th
79	Siah Jamegan	3	45	23	15	7	52	32	+20	**84**	—	1	1	1	2nd
80	Deyhim Ahvaz	4	90	18	22	50	84	157	−73	**76**	—	—	—	2	9th
81	Petrochimi Tabriz	2	52	20	15	17	66	63	+3	**75**	—	—	—	1	3rd
82	Foolad Novin	2	48	20	11	17	62	55	+7	**71**	1	—	—	2	1st
83	**Shahrdari Hamedan**	2	66	15	26	25	43	54	-11	**71**	—	—	—	1	10th
84	Keshto Sannat Shooshtar	3	66	16	23	27	65	89	−24	**71**	—	—	—	1	6th
85	Shahrdari Ardabil	2	60	17	19	24	67	72	−5	**70**	—	—	—	1	6th
86	Shahrdari Mahshahr	2	64	16	18	30	60	76	−16	**66**	—	—	—	1	11th
87	Alvand Hamedan	2	50	17	14	19	56	57	−1	**65**	—	—	—	1	4th
88	Mehrkam Pars	2	52	16	15	21	53	62	−9	**63**	—	—	—	1	9th
89	Yazd Louleh^{19}	2	50	15	17	18	58	53	+5	**62**	—	—	—	1	7th
90	Sanat Sari	2	52	15	16	21	38	58	−20	**61**	—	—	—	1	7th
91	Naft va Gaz Gachsaran	2	46	15	15	16	51	56	−5	**60**	—	—	—	1	7th
92	Fajr Sepah Tehran	2	50	12	19	19	44	56	−12	**55**	—	—	—	1	5th
93	Naft Tehran	2	26	13	10	3	33	16	+17	**49**	1	—	1	1	1st
94	Padideh Khorasan^{20}	1	24	12	10	2	32	15	+17	**46**	1	—	1	—	1st
95	**Van Pars Naghsh-e-Jahan**	1	32	12	9	11	32	29	+3	**45**	—	—	—	—	7th
96	**Chadormalou Ardakan**	1	32	11	12	9	32	31	+1	**45**	—	—	—	—	8th
97	Shahin Ahvaz	3	74	10	13	51	51	152	−101	**43**	—	—	—	1	12th
98	Bargh Jadid Shiraz	1	34	10	11	13	30	34	−4	**41**	—	—	—	1	12th
99	Pasargad Tehran	1	22	11	6	5	41	26	+15	**39**	—	—	—	—	3rd
100	**Darya Babol**	1	32	8	14	10	26	25	+1	**38**	—	—	—	—	10th
101	Vista Toorbin Tehran	1	34	8	13	13	26	33	−6	**37**	—	—	—	1	16th
102	Koma Shiraz	2	36	6	15	15	23	29	−6	**33**	—	—	—	1	6th
103	Tarbiat Khorasan	1	30	7	10	13	26	38	−12	**31**	—	—	—	1	12th
104	Naft Ghaemshahr	1	22	8	6	8	20	22	−2	**30**	—	—	—	1	7th
105	Irsotter Noshahr	2	46	7	9	30	39	106	−67	**30**	—	—	—	1	11th
106	Bank Tejarat	1	22	7	7	8	27	22	+5	**28**	—	—	—	1	9th
107	Foolad Natanz	1	26	6	10	10	30	36	−6	**28**	—	—	—	1	14th
108	Karoon Arvand	1	30	6	10	14	17	36	−19	**28**	—	—	—	1	15th
109	**Khalij Fars Mahshahr**	1	32	7	8	17	21	42	-21	**29**	—	—	—	—	15th
110	Pegah Shush	1	22	5	12	5	24	21	+3	**27**	—	—	—	1	7th
111	Esteghlal Dezful	1	22	6	9	7	19	21	−2	**27**	—	—	—	1	6th
112	Bank Melli	1	30	4	15	11	27	41	−14	**27**	—	—	—	1	16th
113	Hafari Ahvaz	1	26	6	8	12	40	42	−2	**26**	—	—	—	1	12th
114	Part Sazan Mashhad	1	20	6	5	9	17	26	−9	**26**	—	—	—	1	8th
115	Sanam Tehran	1	20	6	7	7	23	24	−1	**25**	—	—	—	1	5th
116	Esteghlal Kish	1	22	7	4	11	25	32	−7	**25**	—	—	—	1	8th
117	Albadr Bandar Kong^{21}	1	24	9	4	11	21	30	−9	**25**	—	—	—	1	11th
118	Nirou Moharekeh	1	30	5	10	15	21	43	−22	**25**	—	—	—	1	15th
119	Shahrdari Kerman	2	42	6	7	29	28	92	−64	**25**	—	—	—	2	11th
120	Nozhan Sari	1	22	4	8	10	12	22	−10	**20**	—	—	—	1	11th
121	Qods Sari	1	22	5	4	13	16	33	−17	**19**	—	—	—	1	11th
122	Pars Khodro	1	22	2	11	9	19	29	−10	**17**	—	—	—	1	11th
123	Yadavaran Shalamcheh	1	26	3	7	16	12	35	−23	**16**	—	—	—	1	14th
124	Shahrdari Langarud	1	22	2	6	14	17	39	−22	**12**	—	—	—	1	12th
125	Vahdat Sari	1	14	3	2	9	16	22	−6	**11**	—	—	—	1	7th
126	Elmoadab Tabriz	1	34	2	4	28	14	85	−71	**10**	—	—	—	1	18th
127	**Omid Vahdat Khorasan**	1	—	—	—	—	—	—	—	—	—	—	—	1	18th

2022–23 Persian Gulf Pro League
2022–23 Azadegan League
Dissolved

Notes:
Only league matches, Play-offs are not included in the all-time table
^{1} Nassaji Mazandaran was deducted three points in the 2012–13 season
^{2} Aluminium Arak was formerly known as PAS Arak, Shensa Arak, Hamyari Arak and Shahrdari Arak
^{3} Malavan was deducted six points in the 2018–19 season
^{4} Payam Mashhad was deducted three points in the 2010–11 season
^{5} Damash Gilan was formerly known as Esteghlal Rasht and Pegah Gilan
^{6} Shahid Ghandi Yazd was formerly known as Tarbiat Yazd
^{7} Shahrdari Tabriz was deducted all 47 points in the 2012–13 season
^{8} Rahian Kermanshah was formerly known as Shirin Faraz
^{9} Rayka Babol was formerly known as Khooneh be Khooneh
^{10} Golreyhan Alborz was formerly known as Oxin Alborz
^{11} Steel Azin was formerly known as Ekbatan
^{12} Steel Azin was deducted twelve points in the 2011–12 season
^{13} Gahar Zagros was formerly known as Damash Lorestan
^{14} Damash Tehran was formerly known as Parseh Tehran
^{15} Havadar was formerly known as Persepolis Pakdasht and Sorkhpooshan Pakdasht
^{16} Zagros Yasouj was formerly known as Shahrdari Yasouj
^{17} Saba Qom was formerly known as Saba Battery
^{18} Persepolis Shomal was formerly known as Saipa Shomal
^{19} Yazd Louleh was formerly known as Sang Ahan Bafgh
^{20} Padideh Khorasan was meanwhile known as Shahr Khodrou Khorasan
^{21} Albadr Bandar Kong was deducted six points in the 2011–12 season
