= 1997–98 Iran 2nd Division =

Iran Football's 2nd Division
- Season: 1997–98
- Champions: Malavan
- Promoted: Malavan; Bank Melli; Chooka Talesh; Aboomoslem
- Relegated: Tak Sport Babolsar; Fajr Alvand Hamedan; Motozhen Tabriz; Fajr Kermanshah; Fajr Rahnan; Moghavemat Tehran; Omran yasuj; Azmayesh Marvdasht

The 1997–98 Iran 2nd Division football season was played in four groups of ten teams each. The top two teams from each group advanced to the second round, and the top four in the second round (Malavan, Bank Melli, Chooka Talesh and Aboomoslem) gained promotion to the Azadegan League, at that time the top-level football league in Iran.

== First round ==
=== Group 1 ===
Pos	Team	Pld	W	D	L	GF	GA	GD	Pts	Promotion or relegation (Note: Table errors: 57 total wins != 58 total losses, 65 total draws is an odd number, and 212 total for != 226 total against)
1	Bank Melli	18	12	3	3	36	12	+24	39	Advanced to the second round
2	Chooka Talesh	18	10	6	2	28	17	+11	36	Advanced to the second round
3	Irsotter Noshahr	18	6	8	4	16	21	−5	26	
4	Behpak Behshahr	18	6	8	4	15	21	−6	26	
5	Adonis	18	6	7	5	23	21	+2	25	
6	Bargh Tehran	18	5	10	3	18	17	+1	25	
7	Tolipers Qazvin	18	6	6	6	24	28	−4	24	
8	Mohemmat sazi	18	3	7	8	14	20	−6	16	
9	Fajr Alvand Hamedan	18	2	4	12	16	31	−15	10	Relegated to 3rd Division
10	Tak Sport Babolsar	18	1	6	11	22	38	−16	9	Relegated to 3rd Division

Source: rsssf.com

=== Group 2 ===
Pos	Team	Pld	W	D	L	GF	GA	GD	Pts	Promotion or relegation (Note: Table errors: 62 total wins != 61 total losses and 57 total draws is an odd number)
1	Esteghlal Rasht	18	9	6	3	26	16	+10	33	Advanced to the second round
2	Malavan	18	9	4	5	24	13	+11	31	Advanced to the second round
3	Homa	18	9	4	5	23	12	+11	31	
4	Ararat Tehran	18	6	9	3	18	14	+4	27	
5	Persepolis Kashan	18	7	4	7	23	24	−1	25	
6	Shahrdari Ardabil	18	5	9	4	12	10	+2	24	
7	Nassaji Mazandaran	18	5	6	7	20	21	−1	21	
8	Fajr uromiyeh	18	5	4	9	18	28	−10	16 (Note: 3 points deducted?)	
9	Fajr Kermanshah	18	3	7	8	15	28	−13	16	Relegated to 3rd Division
10	Motozhen Tabriz	18	4	4	10	15	28	−13	14 (Note: 2 points deducted?)	Relegated to 3rd Division

Source: rsssf.com

=== Group 3 ===
Pos	Team	Pld	W	D	L	GF	GA	GD	Pts	Promotion or relegation (Note: Table errors: 60 total wins != 64 total losses and 186 total for != 194 total against)
1	Aboomoslem	18	10	4	4	28	13	+15	34	Advanced to the second round
2	Rah Ahan	18	9	7	2	21	7	+14	34	Advanced to the second round
3	Navard Ahvas	16	5	7	4	22	21	+1	22	
4	Fajr Sepidrood	18	9	5	4	23	10	+13	32	
5	Mashin Sazi	18	7	6	5	19	12	+7	27	
6	Fajr Sepah	18	7	4	7	21	29	−8	25	
7	Javan Sari	18	4	6	8	9	17	−8	18	
8	Mersad Shiraz	18	4	4	10	13	25	−12	14 (Note: 2 points deducted?)	
9	Moghavemat Tehran	18	3	5	10	12	25	−13	14	Relegated to 3rd Division
10	Fajr Rahnan	18	2	6	10	18	35	−17	12	Relegated to 3rd Division

Source: rsssf.com

=== Group 4 ===
Pos	Team	Pld	W	D	L	GF	GA	GD	Pts	Promotion or relegation (Note: Table errors: 216 total for != 226 total against)
1	Shahin Ahvaz	18	10	3	5	33	19	+14	33	Advanced to the second round
2	Fath Tehran	18	9	6	3	27	25	+2	33	Advanced to the second round
3	Petroshimi Maahshahr	18	9	4	5	19	19	0	31	
4	Keshavarz Tehran	18	8	4	6	26	24	+2	28	
5	Mes Kerman	18	6	6	6	17	14	+3	24	
6	Masood Hormozgan	18	6	5	7	24	23	+1	23	
7	Kashi Yazd	18	6	5	7	14	22	−8	23	
8	Shahin Bushehr	18	5	4	9	29	35	−6	19	
9	Azmayesh Marvdasht	18	4	5	9	14	23	−9	17	Relegated to 3rd Division
10	Omran yasuj	18	4	4	10	13	22	−9	16	Relegated to 3rd Division

Source: rsssf.com

== Second round ==
=== Group 1 ===
Pos	Team	Pld	W	D	L	GF	GA	GD	Pts	Promotion
1	Malavan	14	7	6	1	16	7	+9	27	Promoted to 1997–98 Azadegan League
2	Bank Melli	14	8	2	4	18	8	+10	26	Promoted to 1997–98 Azadegan League
3	Chooka Talesh	14	6	3	5	16	12	+4	21	Promoted to 1997–98 Azadegan League
4	Aboomoslem	14	5	5	4	13	11	+2	20	Promoted to 1997–98 Azadegan League
5	Esteghlal Rasht	14	5	5	4	12	14	−2	20	
6	Rah Ahan	14	4	3	7	8	13	−5	15	
7	Fath Tehran	14	3	4	7	9	17	−8	13	
8	Shahin Ahvaz	14	2	4	8	10	20	−10	10	

Source: rsssf.com
