= 2000–01 Iran 2nd Division =

Iran Football's 2nd Division
- Season: 2000–01
- Champions: Aboomoslem
- Promoted: Aboomoslem; Malavan
- Relegated: Shahrdari Kerman; Shahin Ahvaz; Irsotter Noshahr; Ararat; Fajr Sepah; Petroshimi Maahshahr; Roghan Nabati Sari; Bimeh Iran; Bargh Tehran

Iran Football's 2nd Division 2000–01 season was played in three groups of nine teams each. The top two teams from each group advanced to the second round, and the top two teams from that round – Aboomoslem and Malavan – gained promotion to the Iran Pro League.

== First round results ==
=== Group 1 ===
Pos	Team	Pld	W	D	L	GF	GA	GD	Pts	Promotion or relegation
1	Homa	16	9	4	3	22	14	+8	31	Promoted second round
2	Chooka Talesh	16	9	4	3	21	13	+8	31	Promoted second round
3	Mashin Sazi	16	8	4	4	26	16	+10	28	
4	Rah Ahan	16	7	4	5	21	16	+5	25	
5	Part Sazan Mashhad	16	6	2	8	22	25	−3	20	
6	Esteghlal Novin	16	4	6	6	13	19	−6	18	
7	Irsotter Noshahr	16	4	4	8	23	18	+5	16	Relegated to 2001–02 Azadegan League
8	Shahin Ahvaz	16	4	4	8	18	25	−7	16	Relegated to 2001–02 Azadegan League
9	Shahrdari Kerman	16	4	2	10	21	31	−10	14	Relegated to 2001–02 Azadegan League

Source: rsssf.com

=== Group 2 ===
Pos	Team	Pld	W	D	L	GF	GA	GD	Pts	Promotion or relegation
1	Payam Paykan	16	9	4	3	23	13	+10	31	Promoted second round
2	Mohemmat sazi	16	8	6	2	27	19	+8	30	Promoted second round
3	Sanat Naft	16	8	5	3	24	13	+11	29	
4	Nassaji Mazandaran	16	7	4	5	19	15	+4	25	
5	Mes Kerman	16	6	6	4	20	13	+7	24	
6	Saipa Zanjan	16	4	5	7	11	20	−9	17	
7	Petroshimi Maahshahr	16	3	7	6	14	21	−7	16	Relegated to 2001–02 Azadegan League
8	Fajr Sepah	16	3	5	8	13	17	−4	14	Relegated to 2001–02 Azadegan League
9	Ararat	16	2	2	12	16	34	−18	8	Relegated to 2001–02 Azadegan League

Source: rsssf.com

=== Group 3 ===
Pos	Team	Pld	W	D	L	GF	GA	GD	Pts	Promotion or relegation
1	Aboomoslem	16	8	7	1	27	13	+14	31	Promoted second round
2	Malavan	16	9	4	3	20	11	+9	31	Promoted second round
3	Esteghlal Ahvaz	16	6	8	2	18	14	+4	26	
4	Shemushack	16	7	4	5	24	18	+6	25	
5	Niroye zamini	16	4	7	5	18	14	+4	19	
6	Adonis	16	4	6	6	15	19	−4	18	
7	Bargh Tehran	16	3	5	8	11	19	−8	14	Relegated to 2001–02 Azadegan League
8	Bimeh Iran	16	3	4	9	12	21	−9	13	Relegated to 2001–02 Azadegan League
9	Roghan Nabati Sari	16	2	7	7	9	20	−11	13	Relegated to 2001–02 Azadegan League

Source: rsssf.com

== Second round ==
Pos	Team	Pld	W	D	L	GF	GA	GD	Pts	Promotion
1	Aboomoslem	10	6	2	2	9	7	+2	20	Promoted to 2001–02 Iran Pro League
2	Malavan	10	5	3	2	13	8	+5	18	Promoted to 2001–02 Iran Pro League
3	Payam Paykan	10	4	2	4	10	11	−1	14	
4	Chooka Talesh	10	2	4	4	8	6	+2	10	
5	Mohemmat sazi	10	3	1	6	8	10	−2	10	
5	Homa	10	2	4	4	9	15	−6	10	

Source: rsssf.com
