= 1998–99 Iran 2nd Division =

Iran Football's 2nd Division
- Season: 1998–99
- Champions: Bahman
- Promoted: Bahman; Irsotter Noshahr
- Relegated: Tolipers Qazvin; Vahdat Mahabad; Iran khodro; Shahrdari Ardabil; Mersad Shiraz; Fajr Sepah; Masood Hormozgan; Kashi Yazd

The 1998–99 Iran 2nd Division football season was played in four groups of nine teams each. The top two teams from each group advanced to the second round, and the top two teams from that round (Bahman and Irsotter Noshahr) gained promotion to the Azadegan League.

== First round ==
=== Group 1 ===
Pos	Team	Pld	W	D	L	GF	GA	GD	Pts	Promotion or relegation
1	Bahman	16	10	3	3	37	19	+18	33	Promoted second round
2	Irsotter Noshahr	16	10	0	6	25	18	+7	30	Promoted second round
3	Peyman Tehran	16	9	1	6	19	16	+3	28	
4	Mohemmat sazi	16	7	3	6	27	24	+3	24	
5	Adonis	16	6	5	5	19	22	−3	23	
6	Ararat	16	6	4	6	25	17	+8	22	
7	Behpak Behshahr	16	6	4	6	19	23	−4	22	
8	Vahdat Mahabad	16	6	1	9	17	25	−8	18 (Note: 1 point deducted?)	Relegated to 3rd Division
9	Tolipers Qazvin	16	0	3	13	10	34	−24	3	Relegated to 3rd Division

Source: www.rsssf.com

=== Group 2 ===
Pos	Team	Pld	W	D	L	GF	GA	GD	Pts	Promotion or relegation
1	Bargh Tehran	16	9	4	3	29	14	+15	31	Promoted second round
2	Esteghlal Rasht	16	9	2	5	27	21	+6	29	Promoted second round
3	Persepolis Kashan	16	7	7	2	24	14	+10	28	
4	Payam-Moghavemat	16	8	3	5	23	10	+13	27	
5	Nassaji Mazandaran	16	6	6	4	24	20	+4	24	
6	Electric Khorasan	16	6	5	5	25	23	+2	23	
7	Homa	16	6	4	6	25	21	+4	22	
8	Iran khodro	16	2	2	12	11	33	−22	8	Relegated to 3rd Division
9	Shahrdari Ardabil	16	2	1	13	10	32	−22	7	Relegated to 3rd Division

Source: www.rsssf.com

=== Group 3 ===
Pos	Team	Pld	W	D	L	GF	GA	GD	Pts	Promotion or relegation
1	Esteghlal Ahvaz	16	9	4	3	30	13	+17	31	Promoted second round
2	Fajr Khorramabad	16	7	5	4	16	16	0	26	Promoted second round
3	Navard Ahvas	16	5	7	4	22	21	+1	22	
4	Rah Ahan	16	4	9	3	13	11	+2	21	
5	Sepidrood	16	5	6	5	16	18	−2	21	
6	Javan Sari	16	5	6	5	14	16	−2	21	
7	Mashin Sazi	16	5	4	7	19	17	+2	19	
8	Mersad Shiraz	16	4	6	6	19	27	−8	18	Relegated to 3rd Division
9	Fajr Sepah	16	2	5	9	10	21	−11	11	Relegated to 3rd Division

Source: www.rsssf.com

=== Group 4 ===
Pos	Team	Pld	W	D	L	GF	GA	GD	Pts	Promotion or relegation
1	Mes Kerman	16	9	4	3	23	9	+14	31	Promoted second round
2	Fath Tehran	16	7	8	1	22	11	+11	29	Promoted second round
3	Bargh Shiraz	16	8	5	3	22	13	+9	29	
4	Petroshimi Maahshahr	16	5	7	4	16	16	0	22	
5	Shahin Ahvaz	16	6	4	6	23	24	−1	22	
6	Keshavarz Tehran	16	4	5	7	14	19	−5	17	
7	Shahin Bushehr	16	3	7	6	11	21	−10	16	
8	Kashi Yazd	16	3	4	9	9	20	−11	13	Relegated to 3rd Division
9	Masood Hormozgan	16	2	6	8	14	20	−6	12	Relegated to 3rd Division

Source: www.rsssf.com

== Second round ==
=== Group 1 ===
Pos	Team	Pld	W	D	L	GF	GA	GD	Pts	Qualification
1	Bahman	6	2	4	0	4	1	+3	10	Promoted Play-off
2	Esteghlal Rasht	6	2	4	0	7	5	+2	10	Promoted Play-off
3	Fath Tehran	6	2	3	1	5	3	+2	9	
4	Esteghlal Ahvaz	6	0	1	5	4	11	−7	1	

Source: www.rsssf.com

=== Group 2 ===
Pos	Team	Pld	W	D	L	GF	GA	GD	Pts	Qualification
1	Irsotter Noshahr	6	3	3	0	8	4	+4	12	Promoted Play-off
2	Fajr Khorramabad	6	2	2	2	6	5	+1	8	Promoted Play-off
3	Mes Kerman	6	2	2	2	7	5	+2	8	
4	Bargh Tehran	6	0	3	3	4	7	−3	3	

Source: www.rsssf.com

== Play Off ==
Esteghlal Rasht	3 – 1	Irsotter Noshahr

Rasht

Irsotter Noshahr	2 – 0	Esteghlal Rasht

Noshahr

Irsotter Noshahr promoted to 1999–2000 Azadegan League

Fajr Khorramabad	0 – 0	Bahman

Khorramabad

Bahman	1 – 0	Fajr Khorramabad

Karaj

Bahman promoted to 1999–2000 Azadegan League.

== Final ==
Bahman	–	Irsotter Noshahr

Karaj

(Irsotter Noshahr did not show up, Bahman awarded championship 1998/99)
