= 1999–2000 Iran 2nd Division =

Iran Football's 2nd Division
- Season: 2001–01
- Champions: Bargh Shiraz
- Promoted: Bargh Shiraz; Esteghlal Rasht
- Relegated: KaghazPars; Fajr Khorramabad; Polyacryl Esfahan; Navard Ahvaz; Sepidrood; Shahrdari Tabriz; Fajr Sepah Tehran; Foolad mobarake

Iran Football's 2nd Division 1999–2000 season was played in three groups, with Group 1 comprising nine teams and groups 2 and 3 consisting of ten teams each. The top two teams from each group advanced to the final round, and the top two teams from that round - Bargh Shiraz and Esteghlal Rasht - gained promotion to the Azadegan League.

== Second round results ==
Pos	Team	Pld	W	D	L	GF	GA	GD	Pts	Promotion
1	Bargh Shiraz	10	4	5	1	12	8	+4	17	Promoted to 2000–01 Azadegan League
2	Esteghlal Rasht	10	5	1	4	7	9	−2	16	Promoted to 2000–01 Azadegan League
3	Electric Khorasan	10	4	3	3	14	11	+3	15	
4	Adonis Mashhad	10	4	2	4	11	7	+4	14	
5	Esteghlal Ahvaz	10	3	2	5	12	13	−1	11	
6	Niroye Zamini	10	2	3	5	12	20	−8	9	

Source: rsssf.com

== First round results ==
=== Group 1 ===
Pos	Team	Pld	W	D	L	GF	GA	GD	Pts	Promotion or relegation
1	Esteghlal Ahvaz	16	10	3	3	31	15	+16	33	Promoted second round
2	Esteghlal Rasht	16	10	3	3	21	10	+11	33	Promoted second round
3	Mohemmat sazi	16	8	4	4	24	17	+7	28	
4	Aliaf Tehran	16	8	3	5	32	20	+12	27	
5	Ararat	16	7	2	7	23	25	−2	23	
6	Nassaji Mazandaran	16	6	5	5	16	19	−3	23	
7	Payam Moghavemat	16	4	6	6	14	15	−1	18	
8	Fajr Khorramabad	16	2	3	11	7	29	−22	9	Relegated to 3rd Division
9	KaghazPars	16	1	3	12	20	37	−17	6	Relegated to 3rd Division

Source: rsssf.com

=== Group 2 ===
Pos	Team	Pld	W	D	L	GF	GA	GD	Pts	Promotion or relegation
1	Adonis Mashhad	18	8	6	4	25	16	+9	30	Promoted second round
2	Niroye zamini	18	7	9	2	19	14	+5	30	Promoted second round
3	Keshavarz Tehran	18	8	5	5	23	12	+11	29	
4	Kest va sanat-sari	18	7	6	5	22	22	0	27	
5	Mes Kerman	18	6	8	4	16	15	+1	26	
6	Electric Damavand	18	5	9	4	18	16	+2	24	
7	Bargh Tehran	18	4	9	5	19	22	−3	21	
8	Sepidrood	18	2	10	6	9	17	−8	16	Relegated to 3rd Division
9	Navard Ahvaz	18	2	8	8	16	24	−8	14	Relegated to 3rd Division
10	Polyacryl Esfahan	18	2	8	8	14	23	−9	14	Relegated to 3rd Division

Source: rsssf.com

=== Group 3 ===
Pos	Team	Pld	W	D	L	GF	GA	GD	Pts	Promotion or relegation
1	Bargh Shiraz	18	7	9	2	24	13	+11	30	Promoted second round
2	Electric Khorasan	18	9	3	6	27	20	+7	30	Promoted second round
3	Malavan	18	8	5	5	22	13	+9	29	
4	Shahin Pars Ahvaz	18	8	4	6	26	27	−1	28	
5	Homa	18	9	1	8	22	24	−2	28	
6	Rah Ahan	18	6	8	4	19	15	+4	26	
7	Petroshimi Maahshahr	18	6	4	8	18	19	−1	22	
8	Foolad mobarake	18	5	4	9	17	28	−11	19	Relegated to 3rd Division
9	Fajr Sepah Tehran	18	4	6	8	17	21	−4	18	Relegated to 3rd Division
10	Shahrdari Tabriz	18	4	5	9	15	29	−14	17	Relegated to 3rd Division

Source: rsssf.com
