= 2002–03 Azadegan League =

12th season of Azadegan League

Azadegan League
- Season: 2002–03
- Promoted: Shamoushak Noshahr F.C. Pegah F.C.
- Relegated: Fajr Sepah; Niroye Zamini

The 2002–03 Azadegan League was the 12th season of the League and second as the second highest division since its establishment in 1991.

The final results of the Azadegan League 2002–03 season were:

Pos	Team	Pld	W	D	L	GF	GA	GD	Pts	Promotion or relegation
1	Shemushack	30	15	12	3	36	19	+17	57	Promoted to 2003–04 IPL
2	Pegah Gilan	30	15	8	7	37	22	+15	53	Promoted to 2003–04 IPL
3	Tractor Sazi	30	14	8	8	32	22	+10	50	
4	Payam Mashhad	30	12	15	3	29	17	+12	49	
5	Oghab Tehran	30	12	10	8	39	28	+11	46	
6	Saba Battery	30	11	11	8	32	25	+7	44	
7	Shahab Zanjan	30	11	11	8	30	25	+5	44	
8	Homa	30	10	10	10	26	26	0	40	
9	Mashin Sazi Tabriz	30	9	11	10	40	39	+1	38	
10	Bargh Tehran	30	10	7	13	29	32	−3	37	
11	Rah Ahan	30	9	9	12	21	29	−8	36	
12	Tarbiat Khorasan	30	7	10	13	26	38	−12	31	
13	Nassaji Mazandaran	30	8	7	15	27	42	−15	31	
14	Mes Kerman	30	6	12	12	23	28	−5	30	
15	Fajr Sepah	30	6	11	13	30	40	−10	29	Relegated to 2003–04 2nd Division
16	Niroye Zamini F.C.	30	4	10	16	19	39	−20	22	Relegated to 2003–04 2nd Division

Notes:
- Shahid Ghandi and Sanaye Arak promoted from the 2003-04 Azadegan League.
