= 2002–03 Sepahan F.C. season =

Sepahan
2002–03 season
- Chairman: Mohammad Reza Saket
- Manager: Farhad Kazemi
- Stadium: Naghsh-e Jahan Stadium
- 2nd Pro League: Champions
- 16th Hazfi Cup: Semi-final
Home colours	Away colours	Third colours

The 2002–03 season was Sepahan's 2nd season in the Pro League, their 20th consecutive season in the top division of Iranian Football and 49th year in existence as a football club. They competed in the Hazfi Cup.

== Matches ==
=== Pro league ===
==== League table ====
Pos	Team	Pld	W	D	L	GF	GA	GD	Pts	Qualification or relegation
1	Sepahan (C)	26	16	4	6	47	27	+20	52	Qualification for the 2004 AFC Champions League
2	Pas	26	13	6	7	37	23	+14	45	
3	Persepolis	26	11	11	4	30	21	+9	44	
4	Fajr	26	11	9	6	28	21	+7	42	
5	Paykan	26	10	7	9	27	24	+3	37	

Source: IPL Stats, Soccerway
Rules for classification: 1) Points; 2) Goal difference; 3) Goals scored.
(C) Champions

=== Hazfi Cup ===
==== Bracket ====
- Teams from same city meet only once

Round of 16
Sepahan	3	1	4
Esteghlal	0	0	0
Persepolis	2	0	2(2)
Malavan	0	2	2(3)
Perspolis Hamedan	0	0	0
Zob Ahan	0	7	7
Paykan	6	-	6
Fajr Tehran	2	-	2
Fajr Sepasi	3	1	4
Sanat Naft	2	1	3
Bargh Tehran	1	2	3
Tarbiat Khorasan	0	0	0
PAS Tehran	3	1	4
Foolad	1	1	2
Saipa	0	1	1
Bargh Shiraz	0	0	0

Quarter-finals
Sepahan	4	1	5
Malavan	2	1	3
Zob Ahan	1	2	3
Paykan	1	1	2
Fajr Sepasi	0	1	1
Bargh Tehran	0	0	0
PAS Tehran	1	-	1
Saipa	0	-	0

Semi-finals
Sepahan	1	-	1(3)
Zob Ahan	1	-	1(4)
Fajr Sepasi	0	1	1
PAS Tehran	0	0	0

Final
Zob Ahan	2	2	4(6)
Fajr Sepasi	2	2	4(5)
