= 2002–03 Iran 2nd Division =

Iran Football's 2nd Division
- Season: 2002–03
- Promoted: Shahid Ghandi; Nirou Moharekeh

The following are the standings of the Iran Football's 2nd Division 2002-03 football season.

== First round ==
=== Group A ===
Pos	Team	Pld	W	D	L	GF	GA	GD	Pts	Promotion
1	Chooka Talesh	10	6	3	1	16	8	+8	21	Promoted Azadegan League
2	Etka Tehran	10	4	5	1	9	5	+4	17	Promoted Azadegan League
3	Sanati Kaveh	10	3	4	3	8	8	0	13	
4	Shahrdari Tabriz	10	3	3	4	11	10	+1	12	
5	Olom Pezeshki Gonbad	10	3	2	5	8	13	−5	11	
6	Ghonche Sari	10	1	3	6	5	13	−8	6	

=== Group B ===
Pos	Team	Pld	W	D	L	GF	GA	GD	Pts	Promotion
1	Shahid Ghandi	10	4	6	0	9	2	+7	18	Promoted Second Round
2	Nirou Moharekeh	10	4	4	2	8	9	−1	16	Promoted Second Round
3	Shahrdari Bushehr	10	2	5	3	11	10	+1	11	
4	Ararat Tehran	10	2	5	3	11	10	+1	11	
5	Mersad Shiraz	10	2	4	4	6	9	−3	10	
6	Shahin Bushehr	10	1	5	4	6	13	−7	8	

== Second round ==
Pos	Team	Pld	W	D	L	GF	GA	GD	Pts	Promotion
1	Shahid Ghandi	3	1	2	0	6	2	+4	5	Promoted Azadegan League
2	Nirou Moharekeh	3	0	3	0	3	3	0	3	Promoted Azadegan League
3	Etka Tehran	3	0	3	0	0	0	0	3	
4	Chooka Talesh	3	0	2	1	1	5	−4	2	

== See also ==
- 2002–03 Azadegan League
- 2002–03 Hazfi Cup
- Iranian Super Cup
