= Vahid Hashemian =

Iranian footballer and coach

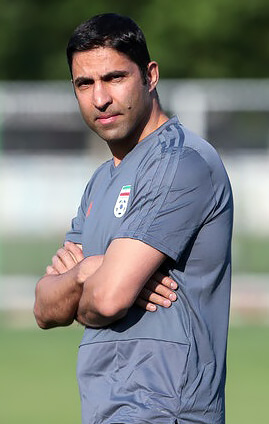
- Hashemian in 2019

Personal information
- Full name: Vahid Hashemian Korbekandi
- Date of birth: 21 July 1976 (age 50)
- Place of birth: Tehran, Iran
- Height: 1.82 m (6 ft 0 in)
- Position: Forward

Youth career
- 1994–1996: Fath Tehran

Senior career*
Years	Team	Apps	(Gls)
1996–1997	Fath Tehran	25	(8)
1997–1999	Pas	26	(9)
1999–2001	Hamburger SV	12	(0)
2001–2004	VfL Bochum	87	(34)
2004–2005	Bayern Munich	9	(1)
2005–2008	Hannover 96	80	(9)
2008–2010	VfL Bochum	41	(3)
2010–2012	Persepolis	22	(4)
Total		302	(67)

International career
1998–2009	Iran	50	(15)

Managerial career
- 2017: Hamburger SV (academy coach)
- 2017–2018: Hamburger SV U17 (assistant)
- 2018: Hamburger SV II (caretaker)
- 2019–2022: Iran (assistant)
- 2025: Persepolis
Medal record
Representing Iran
Asian Games
Gold medal – first place	1998 Bangkok	Team competition
- * Club domestic league appearances and goals

Vahid Hashemian Korbekandi (Persian: وحيد هاشميان کربکندی; born 21 July 1976) is an Iranian football coach and former player. He subsequently worked as assistant coach to Dragan Skočić at Iran national team during his tenure. He played as a forward, spending most of his career in Germany. He made 50 appearances for the Iran national team scoring 15 goals.

== Club career ==
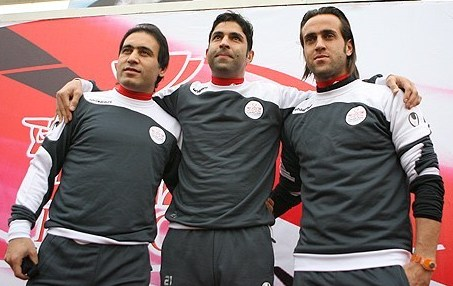
Hashemian (centre) with Ali Karimi and Mehdi Mahdavikia at Persepolis in 2012

Hashemian started his professional football career with Pas Tehran in his homeland. He arrived in Germany for the 1999–2000 season to play for Hamburger SV. Playing alongside his fellow Iranian international Mehdi Mahdavikia, he had just 12 appearances, so he left the club for VfL Bochum to show his real ability. He had three good seasons with Bochum, scoring 34 goals in 87 appearances. During his last season there he scored 16 goals, helping Bochum to finish fifth in the Bundesliga and qualify for the 2004–05 UEFA Cup. This prompted Bayern Munich to grant him in a €2 million contract, hence giving him the chance to follow in the footsteps of Ali Daei. He just scored one goal for Bayern Munich against SC Freiburg in DFB-Pokal while Bayern Munich could beat 7-0.

After one season with Bayern Munich, he joined Hannover 96 at the start of the 2005–06 season. On 23 April 2008, VfL Bochum officials announced that he would return to their club in the season 2008–09. Hashemian signed a two-year contract with an option for one extra year. He scored only one goal for the team and was benched most of the times in his first season. On 30 December 2010, Hashemian signed a deal with Iran Pro League side Persepolis. Where he was able to win the Hazfi Cup. On 19 July 2011, he extended his contract with the Iranian club Persepolis for another year. On 20 May 2012, it was announced that he will be leaving the club at the end of the season. On 21 July 2012, on his 36th birthday, he announced his retirement from football.

== International career ==
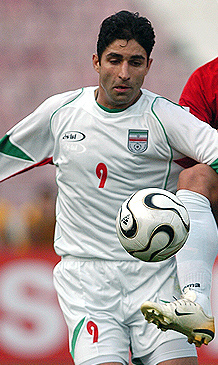
Hashemian with Iran in 2006

Hashemian debuted for the Iran national team on 1 December 1998 in a friendly match against Kazakhstan. After the 2000 Asian Cup he refused to play for Team Melli but after four years finally decided to come and help his country to qualify for the World Cup. Hashemian was a key player for Iran national team in recent years and scored vital goals for the national team, such as netting an important goal in a World Cup qualification game against Qatar in October 2004, as well as scoring two magnificent goals in a win over Japan in Tehran in March 2005. He played all three of Iran's games in the 2006 World Cup.

He started in the line-up in all the games at 2007 Asian Cup, under Amir Ghalenoi , but declined to play for the Iran national team in the first round of 2010 FIFA World Cup Qualifying. Hashemian was later invited for the second round of World Cup Qualifying playing in Iran's 1–1 tie versus Saudi Arabia. He announced that he would retire from the national team and he wished to coach Team Melli when he retires from football.

== Coaching career ==
Hashemian gained his UEFA B Licence in 2008 while playing in Bundesliga, before completing his A Licence in 2012. Hashemian was named as one of the 24 coaches handpicked by the DFB to take part in its 10-month course, Fußballlehrer, in 2014. He also took a three-weeks internship under Pep Guardiola at Bayern Munich, as part of the program, and obtained the german certificate equivalent to UEFA Pro Licence.

=== Oberliga Hamburg (2012–13) ===
Hashemian then started his coaching career in Oberliga Hamburg, where he worked for the next 14 months. Accepting a job offer by Thomas Bliemeister, then-coach of SV Halstenbek-Rellingen who took position as the club's technical director, he was appointed as the coach on 26 October 2012. In July 2013 he signed with Niendorfer TSV, but left the team in the mid-season in order to pursue his professional training.

=== Hamburger SV (2017–18) ===
In early 2017, Hashemian signed a contract with Hamburger SV and was assigned as an individual trainer at the club's youth academy for six months. During the 2017–18 season, he was assistant to the club's U17 coach, Pit Reimers. Replacing Steffen Weiß, the club officially appointed him as the coach of its reserve team in April 2018, because his Fußballlehrer license prevented a lawsuit against the club by demoted players Walace and Mërgim Mavraj, while the former coach did not have any. A few days later, Achim Feifel took over the team and Hashemian was returned to his old job. By the end of season, Weiß remained to coach the reserve team again for the next season and Hashemian rejected an offer to extend his contract as a youth academy trainer He left HSV in May 2018, when the contract expired.

=== Persepolis ===
On 4 July 2025, Hashemian signed a contract with Persian Gulf Pro League side Persepolis.

== Outside football ==
In July 2012, his wife Bita gave birth to a daughter named Elena.

Hashemian has registered a trademark named "German Sports", in order to produce and sell sports equipment under his own name. He has founded German Home LTP GmbH, a company in Germany that specializes in exporting home appliances to Iran.

On 30 January 2026, Hashemian offered condolences to the families of those killed during the 2025–2026 Iranian protests on his Instagram.

== Career statistics ==
=== Club ===
Appearances and goals by club, season and competition:Source:
Club	Season	League			National Cup		League Cup		Continental		Total	
Club	Season	Division	Apps	Goals	Apps	Goals	Apps	Goals	Apps	Goals	Apps	Goals
Fath Tehran	1996–97	Second Division	25	8			–		–			
Pas Tehran	1997–98	Azadegan League			–		–		–			
Pas Tehran	1998–99	Azadegan League					–		4 (Note: Appearances in 1998–99 Asian Cup Winners' Cup)	2		
Pas Tehran	Total											
Hamburger SV	1999–00	Bundesliga	11	0	0	0	–		4 (Note: Appearances in 1999 UEFA Intertoto Cup)	1	15	1
Hamburger SV	2000–01	Bundesliga	1	0	1	0	–		–		2	0
Hamburger SV	Total		12	0	1	0	0	0	4	1	17	1
VfL Bochum	2001–02	2. Bundesliga	21	8	1	0	–		–		22	8
VfL Bochum	2002–03	Bundesliga	34	10	3	1	–		–		37	11
VfL Bochum	2003–04	Bundesliga	32	16	1	1	1 (Note: Appearances in 2003 DFB-Ligapokal)	1	–		34	18
VfL Bochum	Total		87	34	5	2	1	1	0	0	93	36
Bayern Munich	2004–05	Bundesliga	9	0	2	1	2 (Note: Appearances in 2004 DFB-Ligapokal)	0	2 (Note: Appearances in 2004–05 UEFA Champions League)	0	15	1
Hannover 96	2005–06	Bundesliga	29	4	3	1	–		–		32	5
Hannover 96	2006–07	Bundesliga	31	4	2	1	–		–		33	5
Hannover 96	2007–08	Bundesliga	20	1	0	0	–		–		20	1
Hannover 96	Total		80	9	5	2	0	0	0	0	85	11
VfL Bochum	2008–09	Bundesliga	16	1	2	0	–		–		18	1
VfL Bochum	2009–10	Bundesliga	25	2	1	0	–		–		26	2
VfL Bochum	Total		41	3	3	0	0	0	0	4	44	3
Persepolis	2010–11	Pro League	7	1	4	1	–		4 (Note: Appearances in 2011 AFC Champions League)	0	15	2
Persepolis	2011–12	Pro League	15	3	0	0	–		2 (Note: Appearances in 2012 AFC Champions League)	0	17	3
Persepolis	Total		22	4	4	1	0	0	6	0	32	5
Career total			301	67			3	1	16	3		

=== International ===
Appearances and goals by national team and year
National team	Year	Apps	Goals
Iran	1998	3	3
Iran	1999	3	1
Iran	2000	7	2
Iran	2001	1	0
Iran	2004	3	2
Iran	2005	8	3
Iran	2006	9	3
Iran	2007	6	1
Iran	2008	2	0
Iran	2009	8	0
Total		50	15

Scores and results list Iran's goal tally first, score column indicates score after each Hashemian goal.

List of international goals scored by Vahid Hashemian
No.	Date	Venue	Opponent	Score	Result	Competition
1	1 December 1998	Sisaket, Thailand	Kazakhstan		2–0	1998 Asian Games
2	1 December 1998	Sisaket, Thailand	Kazakhstan		2–0	1998 Asian Games
3	8 December 1998	Bangkok, Thailand	Oman		2–4	1998 Asian Games
4	7 June 1999	Edmonton, Canada	Guatemala		2–2	1999 Canada Cup
5	24 May 2000	Amman, Jordan	Kazakhstan		3–0	2000 WAFF
6	24 May 2000	Amman, Jordan	Kazakhstan		3–0	2000 WAFF
7	13 October 2004	Doha, Qatar	Qatar		3–2	2006 FIFA World Cup qualification
8	13 October 2004	Doha, Qatar	Qatar		3–2	2006 FIFA World Cup qualification
9	25 March 2005	Tehran, Iran	Japan		2–1	2006 FIFA World Cup qualification
10	25 March 2005	Tehran, Iran	Japan		2–1	2006 FIFA World Cup qualification
11	13 November 2005	Tehran, Iran	Togo		2–0	Friendly
12	30 January 2006	Tehran, Iran	Costa Rica		3–2	Friendly
13	31 May 2006	Tehran, Iran	Bosnia and Herzegovina		5–2	Friendly
14	2 September 2006	Seoul, Korea Republic	South Korea		1–1	2007 AFC Asian Cup qualification
15	2 July 2007	Tehran, Iran	Jamaica		8–1	Friendly

== Managerial statistics ==
Team	From	To	Competition	Record							
Team	From	To	Competition	G	W	D	L	GF	GA	GD	Win %
SV Halstenbek-Rellingen e.V.	24 October 2012	3 May 2013	Oberliga Hamburg	8	3	5	0	12	9	+3	37.50
Niendorfer TSV 1919 e.V.	1 July 2013	31 December 2013	Oberliga Hamburg	19	7	7	5	25	19	+6	36.84
Hamburger SV II	4 April 2018	8 April 2018	Regionalliga Nord	1	0	0	1	1	2	-1	0.0
Persepolis	4 July 2025	26 October 2025	Persian Gulf Pro	8	2	5	1	7	5	+2	25.0
Total				36	12	17	7	45	35	+10	33.33

== Honours ==
Bayern Munich

- Bundesliga: 2004–05
- DFB-Pokal: 2004–05
- DFB-Ligapokal: 2004

Persepolis

- Hazfi Cup: 2010–11

Iran

- Asian Games Gold Medal: 1998
- WAFF Championship: 2000
