= 2005–06 Iran 2nd Division =

Iran Football's 2nd Division
- Season: 2005–06
- Champions: Pegah Karaj; Etka Tehran

The 2005–06 season in the 2nd division of Iranian football ended with promotion to the Azadegan League for Pegah Tehran, Nassaji Mazandaran, Etka Gorgan and Shahrdari Tabriz. The following were the standings of the 2005–06 Iran 2nd Division football season.

== Standings ==
=== Group A ===
| Pos | Team | Pld | W | D | L | GF | GA | GD | Pts | Promotion or relegation |
|---|---|---|---|---|---|---|---|---|---|---|
| 1 | Pegah Tehran | 22 | 11 | 7 | 4 | 42 | 19 | +23 | 40 | Promotion to 2006–07 Azadegan League |
| 2 | Nassaji Mazandaran | 22 | 10 | 8 | 4 | 25 | 14 | +11 | 38 | Second Place Playoff |
| 3 | Ararat | 22 | 11 | 5 | 6 | 31 | 24 | +7 | 38 | Second Place Playoff |
| 4 | Sanati Kaveh | 22 | 10 | 7 | 5 | 31 | 22 | +9 | 37 | |
| 5 | Sepidrood | 22 | 9 | 7 | 6 | 24 | 21 | +3 | 34 | |
| 6 | Hepco | 22 | 9 | 6 | 7 | 25 | 22 | +3 | 33 | |
| 7 | Sepahan Novin | 22 | 9 | 5 | 8 | 46 | 33 | +13 | 32 | |
| 8 | Petroshimi Tabriz | 22 | 7 | 7 | 8 | 36 | 32 | +4 | 28 | |
| 9 | Per. Borazjan | 22 | 6 | 5 | 11 | 25 | 37 | −12 | 23 | |
| 10 | Nirou Moharekeh | 22 | 4 | 9 | 9 | 20 | 28 | −8 | 21 | Relegation Playoff |
| 11 | Sh. Kerman | 22 | 5 | 5 | 12 | 16 | 40 | −24 | 20 | Relegation Playoff |
| 12 | Keshto Sannat | 22 | 3 | 6 | 13 | 21 | 47 | −26 | 15 | Relegation to 3rd Division 2006-2007 |

Updated to match(es) played on 11 May 2006. Source:
Rules for classification: 1) points; 2) goal difference; 3) number of goals scored.

=== Group B ===
| Pos | Team | Pld | W | D | L | GF | GA | GD | Pts | Promotion or relegation |
|---|---|---|---|---|---|---|---|---|---|---|
| 1 | Etka Gorgan | 22 | 15 | 4 | 3 | 34 | 15 | +19 | 49 | Promotion to 2006–07 Azadegan League |
| 2 | Sh. Tabriz | 22 | 14 | 4 | 4 | 41 | 14 | +27 | 46 | Promotion to 2006–07 Azadegan League |
| 3 | Payam Mokhaberat | 22 | 13 | 6 | 3 | 36 | 14 | +22 | 45 | |
| 4 | Kowsar Tehran | 22 | 8 | 5 | 9 | 31 | 29 | +2 | 29 | |
| 5 | Zob Ahan Ardabil | 22 | 7 | 7 | 8 | 19 | 22 | −3 | 28 | |
| 6 | Chooka | 22 | 7 | 6 | 9 | 24 | 25 | −1 | 27 | |
| 7 | Mes Sarcheshmeh | 22 | 6 | 7 | 9 | 24 | 21 | +3 | 25 | |
| 8 | Parniya Qazvin | 22 | 7 | 4 | 11 | 18 | 32 | −14 | 25 | |
| 9 | Vahdat | 22 | 6 | 4 | 12 | 21 | 33 | −12 | 22 | Relegation Playoff |
| 10 | Payam Khoramabad | 22 | 5 | 7 | 10 | 20 | 32 | −12 | 22 | Relegation Playoff |
| 11 | Maziran | 22 | 4 | 10 | 8 | 16 | 29 | −13 | 22 | Relegation Playoff |
| 12 | Fajr Sepah Tehran | 22 | 4 | 8 | 10 | 23 | 30 | −7 | 20 | Relegation to 3rd Division 2006-2007 |

Updated to match(es) played on 11 May 2006. Source:
Rules for classification: 1) points; 2) goal difference; 3) number of goals scored.

== Second place playoff ==
May 14, 2006 in Arak

| Team 1 | Score | Team 2 |
|---|---|---|
| Nassaji Mazandaran | 0-0(4-2)penalty kick | Ararat |

Nassaji Mazandaran Promoted to Azadegan League.

== Relegation playoff ==
=== Group A ===
May 14, 2006 in Isfahan

| Team 1 | Score | Team 2 |
|---|---|---|
| Nirou Moharekeh | 2-2 (4-2)penalty kick | Shahrdari Kerman |

Shahrdari Kerman Relegated to 3rd Division.

=== Group B ===
| Pos | Team | Pld | W | D | L | GF | GA | GD | Pts | Relegation |
|---|---|---|---|---|---|---|---|---|---|---|
| 1 | Vahdat | 2 | 1 | 0 | 1 | 6 | 6 | 0 | 3 | |
| 2 | Payam Khoramabad | 2 | 1 | 0 | 1 | 5 | 5 | 0 | 3 | |
| 3 | Maziran | 2 | 1 | 0 | 1 | 2 | 2 | 0 | 3 | Relegation to 3rd Division 2006-2007 |

Updated to match(es) played on 23 May 2006. Source:
Rules for classification: 1) points; 2) goal difference; 3) number of goals scored.

Maziran Sari Relegated to 3rd Division.

May 16, 2006

| Maziran Sari | 1 – 0 | Payam Khoramabad |

Shahid Shiroudi Stadium, Tehran

May 19, 2006

| Vahdat | 2 – 1 | Maziran Sari |

Shahid Shiroudi Stadium, Tehran

May 23, 2006

| Payam Khoramabad | 5 – 4 | Vahdat |

Shahid Shiroudi Stadium, Tehran
