= 2003–04 Iran 2nd Division =

Iran Football's 2nd Division
- Season: 2003–04
- Promoted: Sanati Kaveh; Shahin Bushehr; Pasargad Tehran; Azarbaijan Tehran; Ekbatan Tehran; Deyhim Ahvaz; Karoun Shoshtar; Shahrdari Kerman

The following are the standings of the Iran Football's 2nd Division 2003-04 football season.

== National Group ==
Pos	Team	Pld	W	D	L	GF	GA	GD	Pts	Promotion
1	Sanati Kaveh	22	13	4	5	36	21	+15	43	Promoted Azadegan League
2	Shahin Bushehr	22	12	6	4	31	26	+5	42	Promoted Azadegan League
3	Shahrdari Bushehr	22	12	5	5	36	19	+17	41	
4	Mersad Shiraz	22	10	10	2	36	18	+18	40	
5	Niroye zamini	22	10	7	5	26	18	+8	37	
6	Fajr Sepah	22	7	8	7	32	28	+4	29	
7	Shahrdari Tabriz	22	8	4	10	29	30	−1	28	
8	Etka Tehran	22	7	4	11	30	30	0	25	
9	Ararat Tehran	22	6	6	10	22	24	−2	24	
10	Oghab Gonbad	22	4	8	10	17	39	−22	20	
11	Ghonche Sari	22	3	8	11	17	45	−28	17	
12	Chooka Talesh	22	4	2	16	20	47	−27	14	

== Region Groups ==
=== North Group ===
Pos	Team	Pld	W	D	L	GF	GA	GD	Pts	Promotion
1	Pasargad Tehran	10	4	5	1	13	8	+5	17	Promoted Azadegan League
2	Azarbaijan Tehran	10	5	2	3	16	13	+3	17	Promoted Azadegan League
3	Ekbatan Tehran	10	3	6	1	14	9	+5	15	Promoted Azadegan League
4	Sanat Tehran	10	3	6	1	14	9	+5	15	
5	Shahrdari Langarud	10	1	6	3	7	12	−5	9	
6	Kowsar Tehran	10	1	3	6	7	14	−7	6	

=== South Group ===
Pos	Team	Pld	W	D	L	GF	GA	GD	Pts	Promotion
1	Deyhim Ahvaz	10	7	0	3	23	12	+11	21	Promoted Azadegan League
2	Karoun Shoshtar	10	5	2	3	15	15	0	17	Promoted Azadegan League
3	Shahrdari Kerman	10	4	4	2	13	9	+4	16	Promoted Azadegan League
4	Tarbiat Lorestan	10	4	1	5	13	19	−6	13	
5	Pegah Tehran	10	3	3	4	15	12	+3	12	
6	Persepolis Borazjan	10	2	0	8	14	20	−6	6	

== See also ==
- 2003–04 Azadegan League
- 2003–04 Hazfi Cup
- Iranian Super Cup
- 2003–04 Iranian Futsal Super League
