= 2004–05 Azadegan League =

14th season of Azadegan League

Azadegan League
- Season: 2004–05
- Champions: Shahid Ghandi
- Promoted: Shahid Ghandi; Rah Ahan
- Relegated: Shahrdari Kerman; Kheybar Khorramabad

The 2004–05 Azadegan League was the 14th season of the League and fourth as the second highest division since its establishment in 1991.

Following are the standings for the 2004–05 season in the Azadegan League.

== Group 1 ==
Pos	Team	Pld	W	D	L	GF	GA	GD	Pts	Qualification or relegation
1	Payam Mashhad	22	13	6	3	40	33	+7	45	Advanced to the second round
2	Sanat Naft	22	12	4	6	34	22	+12	40	Advanced to the second round
3	Homa	22	11	6	5	42	22	+20	39	
4	Sorkhpooshan	22	11	6	5	28	18	+10	39	
5	Oghab Tehran	22	10	4	8	32	18	+14	34	
6	Shahab Zanjan	22	9	6	7	31	30	+1	33	
7	Sanaye Arak	22	8	8	6	32	27	+5	32	
8	Sanati Kaveh	22	8	4	10	28	30	−2	28	
9	Mashin Sazi	22	6	8	8	18	21	−3	26	
10	Iranjavan	22	5	9	8	18	21	−3	24	
11	Niroye Zamini	22	3	5	14	16	36	−20	14	Play off
12	Shahrdari Kerman	22	2	2	18	9	59	−50	8	Relegated to 2005–06 Iran Football's 2nd Division

== Group 2 ==
Pos	Team	Pld	W	D	L	GF	GA	GD	Pts	Qualification or relegation
1	Rah Ahan	22	13	5	4	43	21	+22	44	Advanced to the second round
2	Shahid Ghandi	22	12	5	5	26	13	+13	41	Advanced to the second round
3	Pasargard	22	11	6	5	41	26	+15	39	
4	Bargh Tehran	22	10	8	4	32	25	+7	38	
5	Mes Kerman	22	9	8	5	23	16	+7	35	
6	Mersad Shiraz	22	8	10	4	26	20	+6	34	
7	Tractor Sazi	22	7	9	6	26	25	+1	30	
8	Karoun Shoshtar	22	6	9	7	26	27	−1	27	
9	Shahin Bushehr	22	5	6	11	28	36	−8	21	
10	Deyhim Ahvaz	22	5	5	12	21	34	−13	20	
11	Ekbatan	22	3	5	14	19	40	−21	14	Play off
12	Kheybar Khorramabad	22	3	4	15	24	52	−28	13	Relegated to 2005–06 Iran Football's 2nd Division

== Second round ==
Pos	Team	Pld	W	D	L	GF	GA	GD	Pts	Promotion
1	Shahid Ghandi	6	3	2	1	16	8	+8	11	Promoted to 2005–06 Iran Pro League
2	Rah Ahan	6	2	3	1	13	7	+6	9	Promoted to 2005–06 Iran Pro League
3	Sanat Naft	6	2	3	1	9	8	+1	9	
4	Payam Mashhad	6	0	2	4	5	10	−5	2	

== Relegation Round ==
Pos	Team	Pld	W	D	L	GF	GA	GD	Pts	Qualification
1	Niroye Zamini	6	3	1	2	9	5	+4	10	Stay in the 2005–06 Azadegan League
2	Ekbatan	6	3	1	2	10	7	+3	10	Stay in the 2005–06 Azadegan League
3	Nassaji Mazandaran	6	3	0	3	7	7	0	9	Stay in the 2nd Division
4	Ararat Tehran	6	2	0	4	7	14	−7	6	Stay in the 2nd Division
