= 2001–02 Azadegan League =

11th season of Azadegan League

Azadegan League
- Season: 2001–02
- Promoted: Esteghlal Ahvaz F.C.(C); Sanat Naft Abadan F.C.
- Relegated: Irsotter Noshahr; Chooka Talesh; Ararat Tehran; Shahrdari Kerman; Shahrdari Bushehr; Pas Arak

The 2001–02 Azadegan League was the 11th season of the League since its establishment in 1991 and its first season as the second highest football league division in Iran.

Following are the final results and standings for the Azadegan League 2001–02 season.

== First round ==
=== Group A ===
Normal to 5

Pos	Team	Pld	W	D	L	GF	GA	GD	Pts	Qualification or relegation
1	Nassaji Mazandaran	20	10	6	4	26	15	+11	36	Promoted to Second Round
2	Shemushack	20	8	10	2	15	7	+8	34	Promoted to Second Round
3	Machine Sazi	20	9	5	6	28	19	+9	32	
4	Bargh Tehran	20	9	4	7	25	20	+5	31	
5	Homa	20	8	7	5	23	18	+5	31	
6	Payam Mashhad	20	7	9	4	33	15	+18	30	
7	Saipa Zanjan	20	7	6	7	25	21	+4	27	
8	Part Sazan Mashhad	20	6	5	9	17	26	−9	23	
9	Ararat Tehran	20	5	7	8	12	18	−6	22	Relegated to 2002–03 Iran 2nd Division
10	Chooka Talesh	20	4	4	12	17	37	−20	16	Relegated to 2002–03 Iran 2nd Division
11	Irsotter Noshahr	20	4	3	13	17	42	−25	15	Relegated to 2002–03 Iran 2nd Division

=== Group B ===
Pos	Team	Pld	W	D	L	GF	GA	GD	Pts	Qualification or relegation
1	Sanat Naft	20	10	7	3	24	11	+13	37	Promoted to Second Round
2	Esteghlal Ahvaz	20	11	3	6	35	22	+13	36	Promoted to Second Round
3	Mes Kerman	20	10	5	5	38	27	+11	35	
4	Oghab Tehran	20	9	5	6	21	29	−8	32	
5	Fajr Sepah Tehran	20	6	8	6	14	16	−2	26	
6	Sanam Tehran	20	6	7	7	23	24	−1	25	
7	Niroye Zamini	20	4	12	4	18	20	−2	24	
8	Rah Ahan	20	5	7	8	12	19	−7	22	
9	Pas Arak	20	6	4	10	21	33	−12	22	Relegated to 2002–03 Iran 2nd Division
10	Shahrdari Bushehr	20	5	5	10	20	25	−5	20	Relegated to 2002–03 Iran 2nd Division
11	Shahrdari Kerman	20	4	5	11	19	33	−14	17	Relegated to 2002–03 Iran 2nd Division

== Second round ==
Pos	Team	Pld	W	D	L	GF	GA	GD	Pts	Promotion
1	Esteghlal Ahvaz	6	3	1	2	7	4	+3	10	Promoted to 2002-03 Iran Pro League
2	Sanat Naft	6	2	3	1	4	2	+2	9	Promoted to 2002-03 Iran Pro League
3	Shemushack	6	2	1	3	2	5	−3	7	
4	Nassaji Mazandaran	6	1	3	2	3	5	−2	6	
