= 2002–03 Hazfi Cup =

Tournament details
- Country: Iran

Final positions
- Champions: Zob Ahan
- Runners-up: Fajr Sepasi

The 2002–03 Hazfi Cup was the 16th season of the Iranian football knockout competition. This tournament is organised annually by the Football Federation Islamic Republic of Iran.

== Bracket ==
- Teams from same city meet only once

Round of 16
Sepahan	3	1	4
Esteghlal	0	0	0
Persepolis	2	0	2(2)
Malavan	0	2	2(3)
Perspolis Hamedan	0	0	0
Zob Ahan	0	7	7
Paykan	6	-	6
Fajr Tehran	2	-	2
Fajr Sepasi	3	1	4
Sanat Naft	2	1	3
Bargh Tehran	1	2	3
Tarbiat Khorasan	0	0	0
PAS Tehran	3	1	4
Foolad	1	1	2
Saipa	0	1	1
Bargh Shiraz	0	0	0

Quarter-finals
Sepahan	4	1	5
Malavan	2	1	3
Zob Ahan	1	2	3
Paykan	1	1	2
Fajr Sepasi	0	1	1
Bargh Tehran	0	0	0
PAS Tehran	1	-	1
Saipa	0	-	0

Semi-finals
Sepahan	1	-	1(3)
Zob Ahan	1	-	1(4)
Fajr Sepasi	0	1	1
PAS Tehran	0	0	0

Final
Zob Ahan	2	2	4(6)
Fajr Sepasi	2	2	4(5)

== Round of 16 ==
Team 1	Agg.	Team 2	1st leg	2nd leg
Persepolis	2–2 (2–3 (p))	Malavan	2–0	0–2

Team 1	Agg.	Team 2	1st leg	2nd leg
Sepahan	4–0	Esteghlal	3–0	1–0

Team 1	Agg.	Team 2	1st leg	2nd leg
Pas Tehran	4–1	Foolad Khuzestan	3–1	1–1

Team 1	Agg.	Team 2	1st leg	2nd leg
Paykan Tehran	6–2	Fajr Sepah Tehran	6–2	–

Team 1	Agg.	Team 2	1st leg	2nd leg
Saipa Tehran	1–0	Bargh Shiraz	0–0	1–0

Team 1	Agg.	Team 2	1st leg	2nd leg
Fajr Sepasi	4–3	Sanat Naft Abadan	3–2	1–1

Team 1	Agg.	Team 2	1st leg	2nd leg
Tarbiat Khorasan	0–3	Bargh Tehran	0–1	0–2

Team 1	Agg.	Team 2	1st leg	2nd leg
Persepolis Hamedan	0–7	Zob Ahan	0–0	0–7

== Quarter-finals ==
Team 1	Agg.	Team 2	1st leg	2nd leg
Bargh Tehran	0–1	Fajr Sepasi	0–0	0–1

Team 1	Agg.	Team 2	1st leg	2nd leg
Pas Tehran	1–0	Saipa Tehran	1–0	–

Team 1	Agg.	Team 2	1st leg	2nd leg
Sepahan	5–3	Malavan	4–2	1–1

Team 1	Agg.	Team 2	1st leg	2nd leg
Zob Ahan	3–2	Paykan Tehran	1–1	2–1

== Semi-finals ==
Team 1	Agg.	Team 2	1st leg	2nd leg
Zob Ahan	1–1 (4–3 (p))	Sepahan	1–1	–
Fajr Sepasi	1–0	Pas Tehran	0–0	1–0

== Final ==
Team 1	Agg.	Team 2	1st leg	2nd leg
Zob Ahan	4–4 (6–5 (p))	Fajr Sepasi	2–2	2–2

Leg 1

6 July 2003

Zob Ahan	2–2	Fajr Sepasi
	Report (ذوب آهن قهرمان جام حذفی شد)

Isfahan, Foolad Shahr Stadium

Leg 2

10 July 2003

Fajr Sepasi	2–2	Zob Ahan
Rajabzadeh; Mohammadi	Report (ذوب آهن قهرمان جام حذفی شد)	Vaziri; Heidari
Penalties
	5–6

Shiraz, Hafezieh Stadium
