= Pasargad Tehran F.C. =

Iranian football club

Pasargad Tehran Football Club was an Iranian football club based in Tehran, Iran. They competed in the 2010–11 Iran Football's 3rd Division.

== Managers ==
- (Slovenia) Marijan Pušnik

== Season-by-season ==
The table below shows the achievements of the club in various competitions.

Season	League	Position	Hazfi Cup	Notes
2003–04	2nd Division	1st/N Group		Promote
2004–05	Azadegan League	3rd/Group 2
2010–11	3rd Division	10th/Group 1	Did not qualify
