= 2006–07 Iran Football's 3rd Division =

Iran Football's 3rd Division
- Season: 2006–07

The following are the standings of the 2006–07 Iran Football's 3rd Division season.

== First round ==
=== Group 1 ===
Pos	Team	Pld	W	D	L	GF	GA	GD	Pts
1	Dorna Tehran	6	5	1	0	10	5	+5	16
2	Saba Battery Golestan	6	3	1	2	9	5	+4	10
3	Esteghlal Bejnord	6	3	0	3	6	6	0	9
4	Shahrdari Mashhad	7	2	0	5	9	9	0	6
5	Ansar Shahrood	7	2	0	5	3	13	−10	6

=== Group 2 ===
Pos	Team	Pld	W	D	L	GF	GA	GD	Pts
1	Fajr District 2 Tehran	10	6	3	1	18	6	+12	21
2	Shahrdari Shahr-e Qods	10	6	2	2	18	3	+15	20
3	Maziran Noshahr	10	5	2	3	21	12	+9	17
4	Sanat Naft Ilam	10	3	2	5	15	23	−8	11
5	Payam Qazvin	10	2	0	8	5	27	−22	6
6	Miladi Qom	10	1	1	8	6	25	−19	4

=== Group 3 ===
Pos	Team	Pld	W	D	L	GF	GA	GD	Pts
1	Rayd Tehran	8	4	2	2	11	11	0	14
2	Shahrdari Lahijan	8	4	1	3	10	14	−4	13
3	Shahrdari Islamshahr	8	4	0	4	11	11	0	12
4	Ghand Islamabad	8	3	2	3	12	14	−2	11
5	Teraktorsazi Novin	8	4	2	2	9	10	−1	14
6	Sazan Rah Qom	8	2	1	5	9	16	−7	7

=== Group 4 ===
Pos	Team	Pld	W	D	L	GF	GA	GD	Pts
1	Shahrdari Bandar Anzali	10	6	2	2	24	6	+18	20
2	Esteghlal Takestan	10	6	2	2	14	11	+3	20
3	Jame Jam Bilesavar	10	4	2	4	10	13	−3	14
4	Setare Sorkh Zanjan	10	4	1	5	21	18	+3	13
5	Oghab Noghde	10	4	0	6	9	19	−10	12
6	Piston Sazi Tabriz	10	2	1	7	9	21	−12	7

=== Group 5 ===
Pos	Team	Pld	W	D	L	GF	GA	GD	Pts
1	Shahrdari Hamedan	10	6	3	1	17	5	+12	21
2	Bargh Kermanshah	11	5	4	2	20	11	+9	19
3	Persepolis Khorramabad	10	4	4	2	18	12	+6	16
4	Sanat Naft Ilam	10	3	2	5	15	23	−8	11
5	Sayna Sanandaj	22	8	5	9	11	21	−10	29
6	Aluminium Sazi Arak	10	1	2	7	13	25	−12	5

=== Group 6 ===
Pos	Team	Pld	W	D	L	GF	GA	GD	Pts
1	Persepolis Ganaveh	7	4	2	1	13	7	+6	14
2	Paris Isfahan	6	4	2	0	9	3	+6	14
3	Oghab Shiraz	7	3	1	3	11	10	+1	10
4	Aham Bafgh Yazd	6	2	0	4	9	6	+3	6
5	Foulad Lorestan	6	0	1	5	15	2	+13	1

=== Group 7 ===
Pos	Team	Pld	W	D	L	GF	GA	GD	Pts
1	Foulad Yazd	8	5	3	0	18	4	+14	18
2	Naft Novin Abadan	8	5	2	1	19	8	+11	17
3	Tohid Bushehr	8	3	2	3	12	11	+1	11
4	Sahrdari Zarand Kerman	7	2	1	4	9	9	0	7
5	Esteghlal Buer Ahmad	8	2	1	5	9	21	−12	7
6	Keyhan Gostar Lordegan	7	1	1	5	7	16	−9	4

=== Group 8 ===
Pos	Team	Pld	W	D	L	GF	GA	GD	Pts
1	Foolad Hormozgan	8	5	3	0	21	10	+11	18
2	Shahrdari Borazjan	8	5	2	1	22	6	+16	17
3	Mes Novin Kerman	8	5	1	2	24	11	+13	16
4	Abfa Saravan	8	2	0	6	5	20	−15	6
5	Shahin Birjand	22	8	5	9	5	31	−26	29

== Second round ==
=== Group 1 ===
- Shahrdari Bandar Anzali- Promoted in 2nd Division (2007–08)
- Esteghlal Takestan
- Saba Battery Golestan
- Dorna Tehran
- Rayd Tehran
- Fajr District 2 Tehran- Promoted in 2nd Division (2007–08)
- Shahrdari Shahr-e Qods
- Shahrdari Lahijan

=== Group 2 ===
- Sharhdari Borazjan
- Foolad Hormozgan- Promoted in 2nd Division (2007–08)
- Shardari Hamedan
- Bargh Kermanshah
- Paris Isfahan
- Persepolis Ganaveh
- Naft Novin Abadan
- Foolad Yazd- Promoted in 2nd Division (2007–08)
