= Nirou Moharekeh Qazvin F.C. =

Iranian football club

Nirou Moharekeh Qazvin FC
- Full name: Nirou Moharekeh Qazvin Football Club
- Founded: 1985
- Dissolved: 2009
- Ground: Shahid Rajaei Stadium; Qazvin; Iran
- Capacity: 15,000
- Chairman: (Iran)
- Manager: (Iran) Bahman Khodakaram
- League: 2nd Division
- 2008–09: 2nd Division, Group A,1st, Promoted Second round, 4th Place, eliminated
Home colours	Away colours

Nirou Moharekeh Qazvin Football Club was an Iranian football club based in Qazvin, Iran. They play in the Iran Football's 2nd Division. The team was sponsored by Nirou Moharekeh Iran Co. (NMI) who have a factory in Qazvin. The team was heavily supported by the people of Qazvin as it was the city's best club.

They were relegated to Iran Football's 2nd Division in the 2003–2004 season, in which they only won 5 games out of 30. They dissolved in 2009.

== Season-by-season ==
The table below chronicles the achievements of Nirou Moharekeh Qazvin in various competitions since 2002.

Season	League	Position	Hazfi Cup	Notes
2002–2003	2nd Division	2nd		Promoted
2003–2004	Azadegan League	15th	First Round	Relegated
2004–2005	2nd Division	3rd	First Round
2005–2006	2nd Division	10th	First Round
2006–2007	2nd Division	6th	First Round
2007–2008	2nd Division	4th	Third Round
2008–2009	2nd Division	1st	First Round	Promoted 2nd Round

== Club managers ==
- (Iran) Mehdi Tondaki 2004–2005
- (Iran) Alireza Rokhcheka 2005–2006
