= Shamoushak Noshahr F.C. =

Iranian football club

Shemushack
- Full name: Shemushack Noshahr
- Founded: 1991; 34 years ago
- Ground: Shohada-ye Nowshahr Stadium; Nowshahr
- Capacity: 6,000
- Owner: Darvish Family
- Chairman: (Iran) Ali Akbar Esmaeilnejad
- Manager: Vacant
- League: 2nd Division
- 2009–10: Azadegan League Group 1, 13th (Relegated)
Home colours	Away colours

Shemushack Noshahr Football Club (Persian: شموشک نوشهر, Shimushik Nushiher) is an Iranian football club based in Nowshahr, Iran. They currently compete in the Iran Football's 3rd Division.

They currently play in the Azadegan League. The team has little talent or success, but is loved by those living in Nowshahr, and games at its small stadium are always a sellout. The team is one of the youngest in Iran and until three years ago was playing in the 2nd division. The team was relegated back into the Azadegan League, on April 16, 2006.

== Season-by-season ==
The table below chronicles the achievements of Shamoushak Noshahr in various competitions since 1994.

Season	League	League Level	Position	Hazfi Cup	Notes
1994–95	2nd Division	Tier 2	2nd	First Round	Promoted
1995–96	Azadegan League	Tier 1	11th	Second Round
1996–97	Azadegan League	Tier 1	15th	Second Round	Relegated
1997–98	2nd Division	Tier 2	10th	Not held
1998–99	2nd Division	Tier 2	12th	Second Round	Relegated
1999-00	3rd Division	Tier 3	1st	Third Round	Promoted
2000–01	2nd Division	Tier 2	4th
2001–02	Azadegan League	Tier 2	3rd	Second Round
2002–03	Azadegan League	Tier 2	1st	Second Round	Promoted
2003–04	Persian Gulf Cup	Tier 1	14th	Third Round
2004–05	Persian Gulf Cup	Tier 1	14th	First Round
2005–06	Persian Gulf Cup	Tier 1	15th	Second Round	Relegated
2006–07	Azadegan League	Tier 2	10th	Third Round
2007–08	Azadegan League	Tier 2	11th	Third Round
2008–09	Azadegan League	Tier 2	11th	1/8 Final
2009–10	Azadegan League	Tier 2	13th	Second Round	Relegated
2010–11	2nd Division	Tier 3	9th/Group A	Did not qualify
2011–12	2nd Division	Tier 3	8th/Group B	First Round	Relegated
2012–13	3rd Division	Tier 4	GroupA	Did not qualify

== Club managers ==
- (Iran) Mokhtar Babaei (2001–02)
- (Iran) Akbar Misaghian (2002–04)
- (Iran) Farshad Pious (2004–05)
- (Iran) Bahman Foroutan (2005–07)
- (Iran) Mohammad Ali Fallahdar (June 2007 – April 7)
- (Iran) Bahman Foroutan (April 2007 – June 8)
- (Iran) Baha Aldin Sanaee (June 2008 – October 9)
- (Iran) Mokhtar Babaei (October 2009–)

== Club honors ==
- Azadegan League:
  - 2003
