= Nirooye Zamini F.C. =

Iranian football club

Niroye Zamini
- Full name: Niroye Zamini Football Club
- Founded: 1980; 39 years ago
- Ground: Shohada of Tehran Nezaja
- Owner: Iran Army
- Head Coach: Dariush Yazdi
- League: Azadegan League
- 2024–25: Azadegan League, 13th
Home colours	Away colours

Niroye Zamini Football Club (Persian: نیروی زمینی, Niruye Zemini) is an Iranian football club based in Tehran, Iran. It is the football team of Iran's ground forces.

== History ==
The club was founded after the Iranian Revolution of 1979 and became the team of the Army. They have competed in the Azadegan League for a long time.

In July 2009, Niroye Zamini terminated their sports activities due to financial problems. Gostaresh Foolad owned by Jamshid Khatibi took over their license. The club re-established later that summer and was placed in the 2nd Division The re-established club currently competes in the Azadegan League.

In 2015 the club was relegated to the 2nd Division after finishing 10th in the Azadegan League.

== Season-by-season ==
=== 1980s ===
17th of Shahrivar league 8th

The table below chronicles the achievements of Niroye Zamini in various competitions since 1999.

Season	Division	League	Position	Hazfi Cup	Notes
1999–00	2nd	2nd Division	6th	Did not qualify
2000–01	2nd	2nd Division	5th	Second Round
2001–02	2nd	Azadegan League	7th	First Round
2002–03	2nd	Azadegan League	16th	First Round	Relegated
2003–04	3rd	2nd Division	5th	Third Round	Promoted
2004–05	2nd	Azadegan League	11th	Second Round
2005–06	2nd	Azadegan League	7th	Third Round
2006–07	2nd	Azadegan League	7th	Third Round
2007–08	2nd	Azadegan League	3rd	First Round
2008–09	2nd	Azadegan League	6th*	Third Round	Relegated
2009–10	3rd	2nd Division	3rd/Group B	Second Round
2010–11	3rd	2nd Division	2nd	Did not qualify	Promoted
2011–12	2nd	Azadegan League	10th	1/16 Final
2012–13	2nd	Azadegan League	6th	1/16 Final
2013–14	2nd	Azadegan League	9th	Third Round
2014–15	2nd	Azadegan League	10th	Round of 32	Relegated
2015–16	3rd	2nd Division	5th/Group A (Second round)	Round of 32
2016–17	3rd	2nd Division	7th/Group C (League table)	withdrew
2017–18	3rd	2nd Division

- Sold its place in Azadegan League to another team
