= 1976–77 Iran 2nd Division =

Iran Football's 2nd Division

Iran Football's 2nd Division
- Season: 1976–77
- Champions: Rah Ahan
- Promoted: Rah Ahan; Tractor
- Relegated: Arsham Kerman; Saneye Elektirik Shiraz

The following were the standings at the conclusion of Iran Football's 1976–77 2nd Division football season.

Rah Ahan won the division title.

== League standings ==
Pos	Team	Pld	W	D	L	GF	GA	GD	Pts	Promotion or relegation
1	Rah Ahan	18	11	4	3	22	9	+13	26	Promoted 1977–78 Takht Jamshid Cup
2	Tractor	18	8	8	2	24	9	+15	24	Promoted 1977–78 Takht Jamshid Cup
3	Rastakhiz Khorramshahr	18	10	3	5	28	11	+17	23	
4	Sepidrood	18	7	7	4	16	9	+7	21	
5	Tehranjavan	18	7	6	5	13	17	−4	20	
6	Bank Sepah	18	5	7	6	12	13	−1	17	
7	Khaneh Javanan Sari	18	4	9	5	14	16	−2	17	
8	Butan	18	4	8	6	13	19	−6	16	
9	Saneye Elektirik Shiraz	18	2	4	12	11	16	−5	8	Relegated to 3rd Division
10	Arsham Kerman	18	2	4	12	10	36	−26	8	Relegated to 3rd Division

== See also ==
- 1976–77 Takht Jamshid Cup
