= 1978–79 Iran 2nd Division =

Iran Football's 2nd Division
- Season: 1978–79
- Champions: Not Completed

The 1978–79 season of Iran Football's 2nd Division was not completed due to disruptions caused by the Iranian Revolution.

== League standings ==
=== Group 1 ===
| Pos | Team | Pld | W | D | L | GF | GA | GD | Pts | Promotion or relegation (Note: 49 total wins != 48 total losses) |
|---|---|---|---|---|---|---|---|---|---|---|
| 1 | Rah Ahan | 13 | 8 | 4 | 1 | 16 | 7 | +9 | 20 | Promoted 1979–80 Takht Jamshid Cup |
| 2 | Ararat | 15 | 5 | 7 | 3 | 12 | 7 | +5 | 17 | Promoted 1979–80 Takht Jamshid Cup |
| 3 | Sepahan | 13 | 5 | 7 | 1 | 15 | 11 | +4 | 17 | |
| 4 | Ekbatan | 13 | 5 | 5 | 3 | 15 | 7 | +8 | 15 | |
| 5 | Sepidrood | 14 | 6 | 2 | 6 | 12 | 13 | −1 | 14 | |
| 6 | Kompidro Tabriz | 12 | 3 | 7 | 2 | 9 | 6 | +3 | 13 | |
| 7 | Tavanir Kerman | 12 | 3 | 5 | 4 | 13 | 11 | +2 | 11 | |
| 8 | Pahlavi Tehran | 12 | 3 | 5 | 4 | 9 | 11 | −2 | 11 | |
| 9 | Mokhaberat Babol | 13 | 4 | 2 | 7 | 8 | 17 | −9 | 10 | |
| 10 | Tehranjavan | 15 | 4 | 7 | 4 | 11 | 11 | 0 | 9 (Note: 6 points deducted?) | |
| 11 | Khaneh Javanan Sari | 11 | 2 | 5 | 4 | 5 | 8 | −3 | 9 | Relegated to 3rd Division |
| 12 | 25 Shahrivar | 14 | 1 | 4 | 9 | 9 | 24 | −15 | 6 | Relegated to 3rd Division |

Source: jahanehfootball.blogfa.com

=== Group 2 ===
| Pos | Team | Pld | W | D | L | GF | GA | GD | Pts | Promotion or relegation (Note: 67 total draws is an odd number) |
|---|---|---|---|---|---|---|---|---|---|---|
| 1 | Bisoton Kermanshah | 12 | 5 | 7 | 0 | 17 | 7 | +10 | 17 | Promoted 1979–80 Takht Jamshid Cup |
| 2 | Gosht Lorestan | 13 | 6 | 5 | 2 | 13 | 8 | +5 | 17 | Promoted 1979–80 Takht Jamshid Cup |
| 3 | Gomrok Ahvaz | 13 | 6 | 4 | 3 | 20 | 8 | +12 | 16 | |
| 4 | Ghand Dezfol | 14 | 5 | 6 | 3 | 11 | 9 | +2 | 16 | |
| 5 | Iranjavan Bushehr | 15 | 4 | 8 | 3 | 13 | 12 | +1 | 16 | |
| 6 | Taban Bushehr | 14 | 4 | 7 | 3 | 17 | 15 | +2 | 15 | |
| 7 | Siman Fars | 12 | 3 | 6 | 3 | 10 | 12 | −2 | 12 | |
| 8 | Shishe Hamedan | 13 | 4 | 3 | 6 | 8 | 11 | −3 | 11 | |
| 9 | Saneye Elektirik Shiraz | 14 | 4 | 3 | 7 | 9 | 13 | −4 | 11 | |
| 10 | Hakhamanesh | 13 | 3 | 5 | 5 | 9 | 14 | −5 | 11 | |
| 11 | Shahrdari Khorramshahr | 13 | 1 | 7 | 5 | 8 | 13 | −5 | 9 | Relegated to 3rd Division |
| 12 | Bizhan Sanandaj | 13 | 1 | 6 | 6 | 9 | 20 | −11 | 8 | Relegated to 3rd Division |

Source: jahanehfootball.blogfa.com

== See also ==
- 1978–79 Takht Jamshid Cup
