= Novin =

Novin نوين
- Village
- Location within Iran
- Coordinates: 35°11′24″N 46°21′31″E
- Country: Iran
- Province: Kurdistan
- County: Sarvabad
- Bakhsh: Uraman
- Rural District: Shalyar

Population (2006)
  - Total: 727
- Time zone: UTC+3:30 (IRST)
  - Summer (DST): UTC+4:30 (IRDT)

Novin (Persian: نوين, also Romanized as Novīn, Nowīn, Navīn, and Nāwin; also known as Novan) is a village in Shalyar Rural District, Uraman District, Sarvabad County, Kurdistan Province, Iran. At the 2006 census, its population was 727, in 179 families. The village is populated by Kurds.
