= 2003–04 Azadegan League =

13th season of Azadegan League

Azadegan League
- Season: 2003–04
- Promoted: Saba Battery; Malavan
- Relegated: Nirou Moharekeh; Nassaji Mazandaran
- Matches: 240
- Goals: 536 (2.23 per match)
- Top goalscorer: Mohsen Garousi (13 goals)

The 2003–04 Azadegan League was the 13th season of the League and third as the second highest division since its establishment in 1991.

Following are the final results and standings for the Azadegan League 2003–04 season.

| Pos | Team | Pld | W | D | L | GF | GA | GD | Pts | Promotion or relegation |
|---|---|---|---|---|---|---|---|---|---|---|
| 1 | Saba Battery | 30 | 18 | 9 | 3 | 54 | 28 | +26 | 63 | Promoted to 2004–05 IPL |
| 2 | Malavan | 30 | 15 | 10 | 5 | 46 | 21 | +25 | 55 | Promoted to 2004–05 IPL |
| 3 | Shahid Ghandi | 30 | 14 | 7 | 9 | 46 | 31 | +15 | 49 | |
| 4 | Naft Abadan | 30 | 13 | 8 | 9 | 36 | 26 | +10 | 47 | |
| 5 | Bargh Tehran | 30 | 11 | 13 | 6 | 29 | 18 | +11 | 46 | |
| 6 | Payam Mashhad | 30 | 10 | 13 | 7 | 32 | 30 | +2 | 43 | |
| 7 | Mashin Sazi | 30 | 11 | 8 | 11 | 35 | 41 | −6 | 41 | |
| 8 | Tractor Sazi | 30 | 9 | 13 | 8 | 34 | 32 | +2 | 40 | |
| 9 | Homa | 30 | 9 | 11 | 10 | 42 | 37 | +5 | 38 | |
| 10 | Shahab Zanjan | 30 | 9 | 10 | 11 | 29 | 39 | −10 | 37 | |
| 11 | Rah Ahan | 30 | 9 | 8 | 13 | 30 | 41 | −11 | 35 | |
| 12 | Oghab | 30 | 7 | 12 | 11 | 31 | 34 | −3 | 33 | |
| 13 | Mes Kerman | 30 | 8 | 9 | 13 | 28 | 34 | −6 | 33 | |
| 14 | Sanaye Arak | 30 | 8 | 8 | 14 | 30 | 43 | −13 | 32 | |
| 15 | Nirou Moharekeh | 30 | 5 | 10 | 15 | 21 | 43 | −22 | 25 | Relegated to 2004–05 2nd Division |
| 16 | Nassaji Mazandaran | 30 | 5 | 9 | 16 | 13 | 43 | −30 | 24 | Relegated to 2004–05 2nd Division |
