= Part Sazan Mashhad F.C. =

Iranian football club

Part Sazan Mashhad
- Full name: Part Sazan Football Club
- Founded: 2000; 25 years ago
- Dissolved: 2002; 23 years ago
- 2001–02: Azadegan League, 8th

Part Sazan Mashhad Football Club (Persian: باشگاه فوتبال پارت سازان مشهد) is an Iranian association football club based in Mashhad.
