= Rah Ahan Tehran F.C. =

Iranian football club

Rah Ahan FC
- Full name: Rah Ahan Sports Club
- Founded: 2 January 1927; 99 years ago
- Ground: Shahid Derakhshan Stadium
- Capacity: 12,000
- League: Tehran Province league
Home colours	Away colours

Rah Ahan Sports Club (Persian: باشگاه ورزشی راه‌آهن, Bashgah-e Vârzeshi-ye Rahâhen), commonly known as Rah Ahan Football Club, was an Iranian professional football club based in Tehran. They last played in the Azadegan League. Rah Ahan is one of the oldest Iranian football clubs.

== History ==
=== Establishment ===
Rah Ahan was formed in 1927 in Tehran by Iran Railways but were bought by Mehr Afarin Holding. They are one of the oldest Iranian football clubs still in existence.

In 1939 Rah Ahan participated in the Tehran Local League for the first time. Their first official match was on 4 January 1940 against Bazargani F.C.; they won the game 11–0.

Rah Ahan is currently owned by Mehrafarin Holding.

=== 1950s ===
During the World War in the 1940s Rah Ahan dissolved its football operations, and did not restart its team until the 1950s. After its re-establishment the club under the name of Pirouz played on the dirt pitches near the railway station. The players of the team were railway workers. In 1955 with the arrival of Rasoul Madadnavi from Tabriz, the club was again renamed to Rah Ahan and began to attract players from outside the railway company. After achieving good results in the 1958 season Rah Ahan was promoted to the 1st Division Tehran League. However, due to new restrictions regarding private clubs in the Tehran Local Leagues, the club was denied the right to compete and eventually ceased its operations.

=== Pre-Revolution ===
In 1963 Rah Ahan was again re-established and were placed in the 2nd Division Tehran Local League. In 1966 Rah Ahan was finally promoted to the top division of the Tehran Local Leagues. In 1973 the Takht Jamshid Cup, Iran's first national league, was founded. In their first two years in the Cup, Rah Ahan finished a respectable 7th and 9th. In 1976 they were relegated to the 2nd Division. In their only season in the 2nd Division, Rah Ahan finished 1st in the league and were again promoted to the Takht Jamshid Cup. In 1978 they were again relegated to the 2nd Division, but they could not finish the 2nd Division season because of the Iranian Revolution.

=== Iran Pro League ===
After the establishment of the Iran Pro League in 2001, Rah Ahan was placed in the second tier Azadegan League. In 2005 Rah Ahan was promoted to the Iran Pro League after a second-place finish in the Azadegan League. Since then they have mostly been an average team and have finished in the mid-table, but since the arrival of Ansarifard as the chairman they have looked more stable. They finished 11th in the 2008–09 season and avoided relegation in the season after the last week.

=== Ali Daei ===
In the 2012–13 season, under Ali Daei, the team got out to an early start, and were 4th in the Iran Pro League after the opening few weeks. After that the team had an average year, dropping to 8th by the season's end. In the same year they went on tour in Turkey, beating Galatasaray A2 4–1, and losing to Super Lig side Istanbul BB 3–2. At the end of the 2012–13 season Ali Daei left Rah Ahan to sign with Persepolis.

=== Trouble years ===
Mansour Ebrahimzadeh was announced as Rah Ahan's new manager for the 2013–14 season. With him in charge Rah Ahan finished an average 11th place. At the end of the season, Ebrahimzadeh announced that he was stepping down as Rah Ahan's manager. Former Persepolis manager Hamid Estili was named as his replacement. Rah Ahan encountered severe financial problems and under Estili the club performed poorly. Estili was soon fired and replaced with former Rah Ahan player Farhad Kazemi.

In the 2015–16 season, Rah Ahan ran into financial troubles, finished 15th in the Persian Gulf Pro League and were relegated. This was the first time Rah Ahan would play in the Azadegan League in 12 years.

== Season-by-season ==
The table below chronicles the achievements of Rah Ahan F.C. every season, from 1968 to the present day.

Season	Div.	League	Position	Hazfi Cup	Notes
1968–69	1	Tehran League	10th	Not held
1969–70	1	Tehran League	8th	Not held
1970–71	1	Tehran League	10th	Not held
1973–74	1	Takht Jamshid Cup	7th	Not held
1974–75	1	Takht Jamshid Cup	9th	Not held
1975–76	1	Takht Jamshid Cup	15th	Quarterfinal	Relegated
1976–77	2	2nd Division	1st	1/16 Final	Promoted
1977–78	1	Takht Jamshid Cup	16th	Not held	Relegated
1978–79	2	2nd Division	N/A	Not held	League not finished
1979–80	1	Tehran League	Not held	Not held
1980–81	1	Tehran League	Not held	Not held
1981–82	1	Tehran League	5th	Not held
1982–83	1	Tehran League	9th	Not held
1983–84	1	Tehran League	10th	Not held
1984–85	1	Tehran League	N/A	Not held	League not finished
1985–86	1	Tehran League	8th	Not held
1986–87	1	Tehran League	6th
1987–88	1	Tehran League	6th
1988–89	1	Tehran League	12th
1989–90	1	Tehran League	9th	Not held
1990–91	1	Tehran League	17th		Relegated
1991–92	4	Tehran 2nd Division	5th
1992–93	4	Tehran 2nd Division	2nd	Not held	Promoted
1993–94	3	Tehran League	7th
1994–95	3	Tehran League	2nd		Promoted
1995–96	2	2nd Division	5th
1996–97	2	2nd Division	6th
1997–98	2	2nd Division	6th	Not held
1998–99	2	2nd Division	4th
1999–00	2	2nd Division	6th
2000–01	2	2nd Division	4th
2001–02	2	Azadegan League	8th
2002–03	2	Azadegan League	11th
2003–04	2	Azadegan League	11th
2004–05	2	Azadegan League	2nd		Promoted
2005–06	1	Pro League	13th
2006–07	1	Pro League	16th	1/16 Final
2007–08	1	Pro League	12th	Quarterfinal
2008–09	1	Pro League	11th	Final
2009–10	1	Pro League	14th	1/16 Final
2010–11	1	Pro League	15th	1/16 Final
2011–12	1	Pro League	11th	1/16 Final
2012–13	1	Pro League	8th	1/8 Final
2013–14	1	Pro League	11th	1/4 Final
2014–15	1	Iran Pro League	12th	1/8 Final
2015–16	1	Iran Pro League	15th	1/16 Final	Relegated
2016–17	2	Azadegan League	15th	1/32 Final
2017–18	2	Azadegan League	18th	1/32 Final	Relegated
2018–19	3	2nd Division	Did Not Participate	Did Not Participate	Relegated

=== Reserves ===
The table below shows the achievements of the club's reserve team in various competitions.

Season	League	Position	Hazfi Cup
2010–11	3rd Division	9th/Group 2	Did not qualify
2011–12	Tehran Provincial League	7th/Group 1	Did not qualify
2012–13	Tehran Provincial League	7th/Group 1	Did not qualify
2013–14	Tehran Provincial League	1st/Group 1	Did not qualify

== Managers ==
=== IPL managers ===
As of 23 October 2017

Name	Nat	From	To
Firouz Karimi	(Iran)	June 2004	February 2006
Abbas Razavi	(Iran)	February 2006	November 2006
Akbar Misaghian	(Iran)	December 2006	February 2008
Davoud Mahabadi	(Iran)	February 2008	October 2008
Mahmoud Yavari	(Iran)	October 2008	April 2009
Mehdi Tartar	(Iran)	April 2009	June 2009
Ernie Brandts	(Netherlands)	July 2009	December 2009
Mehdi Tartar	(Iran)	December 2009	June 2010
Rasoul Korbekandi	(Iran)	June 2010	September 2010
Mehdi Tartar	(Iran)	September 2010	July 2011
Ali Daei	(Iran)	July 2011	May 2013
Mansour Ebrahimzadeh	(Iran)	July 2013	June 2014
Hamid Estili	(Iran)	June 2014	February 2015
Ali Latifi (Interim)	(Iran)	February 2015	February 2015
Farhad Kazemi	(Iran)	February 2015	September 2015
Mehdi Tartar	(Iran)	September 2015	February 2016
Ioannis Topalidis	(Greece)	February 2016	May 2016
Mehdi Pashazadeh	(Iran)	July 2016	January 2017
Sirous Dinmohammadi	(Iran)	January 2017	October 2017
Mohsen Bayatinia	(Iran)	October 2017	present

== Coaching staff ==
Position	Name
Head Coach	(Iran) Mohsen Bayatinia
Goalkeeping Coach	(Germany) Niko Sternberg
Athletic Coach	(Germany) Dominic Palmer
