= Shahid Ghandi Yazd F.C. =

Iranian football club

Shahid Ghandi Yazd
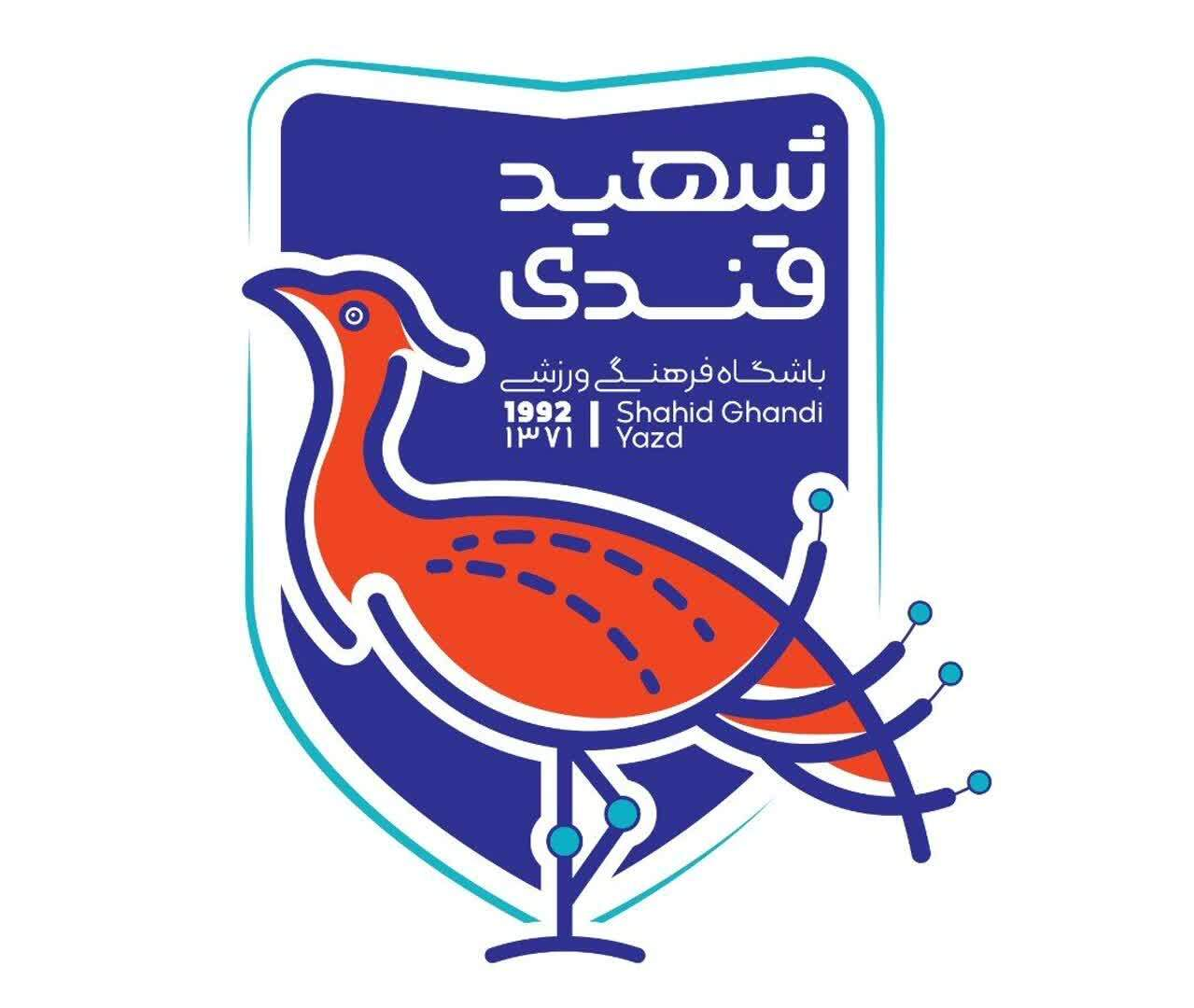
- Shahid Ghandi Yazd
- Full name: Shahid Ghandi Yazd Football Club
- Founded: 1991; 26 years ago
- Ground: Nassiri Stadium, Yazd
- Capacity: 15,000
- Manager: Vahid Mazaheri
- 2021–22: League 2 Group B, 3rd
Home colours	Away colours

Shahid Ghandi Yazd Football Club is an Iranian football team based in Yazd, Iran.

They entered to the Iran Pro League only one season in 2005–06. Now this team is playing in League 2 (Iran), the third division of Iran's football pyramid.

== Club history ==
The club was originally known as Shahid Ghandi Yazd, but after one season in the IPL, the club finished last and was relegated. Their main sponsor, the Yazd Cable Company was facing financial problems and could not afford to sponsor the team any longer. At first it appeared as if the club would be forced to fold altogether, but on July 20, 2006, a new set of sponsors came forward and the team was renamed Esteghlal Yazd. The team was supposed to solve its financial problems using their connections with Esteghlal FC. Less than two weeks later though, Fathollahzadeh decided not to continue as club chairman and fulfill his promises. The local government in the province of Yazd found a new financial sponsor for the team. Yazd Behrouk Cement Co. agreed to help the team. Once again, the football team changed its name and was briefly known as Siman Behrouk Yazd FC. That same month, the club lost its sponsors again, and had to find another financial backer. The club was able to do so, and changed its name to Talieh Yazd. In a move which continued to show the poor state of football in Yazd, the team changed its name for a fourth time. The team is now sponsored by the provinces Physical Education Organization and will be called Tarbiat Badani Yazd. They stayed in the Azadegan League. They finished fifth in their group in 2008–2009 season. In June 2012, the club sold its license to Sang Ahan Bafg, and dissolved due financial circumstances.

=== Refounded ===
In the summer of 2014 the club was refounded as Tarbiat Yazd Novin and entered the 2014–15 Azadegan League season.

== Season-by-season ==
The table below chronicles the achievements of Tarbiat Yazd in various competitions since 2003.

Year	Division	Position	Hazfi Cup
2002–03	Division 2	1st	
2003–04	Division 1	3rd	Third Round
2004–05	Division 1	1st	First Round
2005–06	Pro League	16th	Second Round
2006–07	Division 1	4th	Third Round
2007–08	Division 1	3rd	First Round
2008–09	Division 1	5th	Second Round
2009–10	Division 1	3rd	Third Round
2010–11	Division 1	8th	Second Round
2011–12	Division 1	12th	Third Round

== Club chairmen ==
- (Iran) Abdolreza Dasta (Shahid Ghandi)
- (Iran) Ali Fathollahzadeh (Esteghlal Yazd) (July 2006 – Aug 06)
- (Iran) Mahmoud Amiri (Siman Behbouk, Talieh Yazd & Tarbiat Badani Yazd) (Aug 2006–)
- (Iran) Kamran Ghorbani

== Club managers ==
- (Germany) Hans-Jürgen Gede (2005–06)
- (Iran) Majid Jalali (2006)
- (Iran) Ebrahim Talebi (2006 – Nov 07)
- (Iran) Hamid Reza Asiabanpour (Interim)
- (Iran) Davoud Mahabadi (Dec 2008 – Aug 09)
- (Iran) Yahya Golmohammadi (Aug 2009–10)
- (Iran) Davoud Mahabadi (Sep 2010 – Feb 11)
- (Iran) Hadi Bargizar (March 2011 – Jan 12)
- (Iran) Mahmoud Amiri (Jan 2012 – June 2012)
