= Fath Tehran F.C. =

Iranian football club

- Full name: Fath Tehran Football Club
- Founded: 1981
- Ground: Azadi Stadium
- Capacity: 78,116

Fath Tehran F.C. was an Iranian Football club based in Tehran, Iran.
