= Adonis Mashhad F.C. =

Iranian football club

- Full name: Adonis Mashhad Football Club
- Short name: Adonis
- Founded: 1998;24 years ago

Adonis Mashhad was an Iranian football club based in Mashhad, Khorasan. They played in the Iranian Second Division during 1999–00 season. The team was sponsored and owned by Adonis MFG Co Ltd. This was the club that Persian Gulf Pro League all-time record goalscorer Reza Enayati played for in his youth.

== Managers ==
- (Iran) Hossein Fekri

== Famous players ==
- (Iran) Reza Enayati
