= Shahin Ahvaz F.C. =

Iranian football club

Shahin Ahvaz شاهین اهواز
- Full name: Shahin Ahvaz Football Club
- Founded: 1948; 78 years ago
- Ground: Takhti Ahvaz
- Capacity: 15,000
- League: Khuzestan Premier League
- Website: http://shahinbasketballclub.com/
Home colours	Away colours

Shahin Ahvaz Football Club (Persian: باشگاه فوتبال شاهین اهواز), commonly known as Shahin Ahvaz, is an Iranian football club based in Ahvaz, Khuzestan, that competes in the Khuzestan Premier League. The club was founded in 1948.

The football team plays their home games at the Takhti Ahvaz which has a seating capacity of 15,000. The club also consists of various other departments including a basketball team.

== History ==
=== Establishment ===
The club was founded in 1948. The club was one of Shahin Tehran branches at the time.

The golden years were in the 1980s when the team was being managed by Dr. Shariati, Mr. Ashrafi, and Mr. Nasirabbasi. The team won their first every "Hazfi" cup after defeating Perspolis Tehran in the semi-finals and then Malavan Anzali in the final game. With that championship, they made it to the AFC cup. Shahin Ahvaz hosted the first round and they beat all three teams and advanced to the next round. After that year, the management started with new players, however due mostly to lack of sponsorships and mismanagement, Shahin was never able to re-claim their past golden era and always remained in the second division.

== Season-by-Season ==
Season	League	Position	Hazfi Cup	Notes
1988–89	17th of Shahrivar league	9th	Cup

The table below chronicles the achievements of Shahin Ahvaz in various competitions since 2007.

Season	League	Position	Hazfi Cup	Notes
2007–08	Azadegan League	12th	Third round
2008–09	Azadegan League	12th	Did not qualify
2009–10	Azadegan League	14th	Third Round	Relegated
2010–11	2nd Division

== Head coaches ==
- (Iran) Saeed Salamat

== Players ==
=== First Team Squad ===
As of May 23, 2010 Note: Flags indicate national team as defined under FIFA eligibility rules; some limited exceptions apply. Players may hold more than one non-FIFA nationality.

No.	Pos.	Nation	Player
—		IRN	Farshid Jafari
—		IRN	Mohammad Safarian
—		IRN	Afshin Ghasemian
—		IRN	Sajjad Yazdani
—		IRN	Shoeyb Amiri
—		IRN	Yahdollah Rastkerdar
—		IRN	Mohammad Charim
—		IRN	Abdulrahman Sameri
—		IRN	Mohammad Zahirinasab
—		IRN	Foad Rabiei
—		IRN	Mojadeh Yafali
—	MF	IRN	Hossein Baghlani

No.	Pos.	Nation	Player
—		IRN	Eshan Robaeipour
—		IRN	Masoud Daghegheleh
—		IRN	Mohammad Zereshki
—		IRN	Mahmood Hajipour
—		IRN	Moein Rashidi
—		IRN	Rashid Robaeipour
—		IRN	Farid Andikaei
—		IRN	Iman Alizadeh
—		IRN	Aghil Daghagheleh
—	DF	IRN	Cyrus Habashirzadeh
—		IRN	Emad Hashem

For recent transfers, see List of Iranian football transfers, summer 2010.

== Honors ==
- Hazfi Cup:

Winners (1): 1988

- Iran's representative at 1989-90 Asian Club Championship
