= Petroshimi Maahshahr F.C. =

Iranian football club

Petroshimi Mahshahr Football Club (Persian: باشگاه فوتبال پتروشیمی ماهشهر) was an Iranian football team based in Mahshahr, Iran.
