= Machine Sazi Tabriz =

Factory in Tabriz, Iran

Machine Sazi Tabriz (M.S.T)
- Type: Public company
- Industry: Machine Tools
- Founded: Tabriz 1969
- Headquarters: Tabriz, Iran
- Area served: Worldwide
- Number of employees: 800
- Website: http://www.mst-group.com/

Machine Sazi Tabriz Co. (Tabriz Machinery Manufacturing Co.) which is also called by its abbreviation MST, is a Machine tool manufacturing factory in Tabriz, Iran. The major products of the factory are machinery tools such as turning machines, milling machines, drilling machines, grinding machines. A large variety of MST's products are CNC controlled machines. The MST manufacturing complex established on 1969 with technological helps from east European countries. The MST serves as a nationwide base for design and manufacturing of machine tools. MST owns the Machine Sazi football club, since 1969 to now.
