= Fajr Sepah Tehran F.C. =

Iranian football club

Fajr Sepah Tehran Football Club (Persian: فجر سپاه تهران, Fejr-e Sepah-e Tehran) is an Iranian football club based in Tehran and owned by Islamic Revolutionary Guard Corps. many of Iranian footballers serve their Conscription with playing for the club. They have competed in 1999–2000 Iran Football's 2nd Division. The club is Fajr Sepasi's sister club.
