= Azadegan League =

Association football league in Iran

1st Division دسته اول Daste Aval
- Organising bodies: Iran Football League Organization
- Founded: 1991 (as first tier); 2001 (as second tier)
- Country: Iran
- Confederation: AFC
- Number of clubs: 16 (2026–27)
- Level on pyramid: 2
- Promotion to: Persian Gulf Pro League
- Relegation to: League 2
- Domestic cup: Hazfi Cup
- Current champions: Nassaji Mazandaran (1st title) (2025–26)
- Most championships: Persepolis (4 titles)
- Broadcasters: IRIB; Anten
- Website: league1football.ir persianleague.com
- Current: 2026–27 Azadegan League

The Azadegan League (Persian: ليگ آزادگان, Lig-e Âzâdegân), also known as League 1 (Persian: لیگ یک, Lig-e Yek), is the second highest division of professional football in Iran. It was the top-level football league in Iran from its foundation in 1991 until 2001, when the Persian Gulf Pro League was established.

Azadegan League operates on a system of promotion and relegation. Each year, the top finishing teams in the Azadegan League are promoted to the Persian Gulf Pro League, and the lowest finishing teams are relegated to League 2.

Since 2016, the league comprises 18 teams. The winner and the runner-up of the Azadegan League are automatically promoted to the Persian Gulf Pro League. The bottom three teams in the league are relegated to League 2. In the past, the format and number of teams were changed for various times.

== Alternative names ==
The Azadegan League, also known as the second tier of Iranian professional football, has been referred to by several official, alternative, historical, and abbreviated names.

=== Official and common names ===
- Azadegan League
- Iran Azadegan League
- Iranian Azadegan League
- Azadegan Football League
- Iran First Division
- Iranian First Division
- Iran Division 1
- Iranian Division 1
- League 1
- League One
- Iran League 1
- Iranian League 1
- Daste Aval
- Dasteh Aval

=== Abbreviations and short names ===
- AL – Azadegan League
- IAL – Iranian Azadegan League
- IL1 – Iran League 1
- Iran D1 – Iran Division 1
- Division 1
- League 1
- L1

=== Historical names and classifications ===
- Azadegan League (First Tier, 1991–2001)
- Azadegan League (Second Tier, 2001–present)
- Iranian First Division
- Iran First Division
- Iran Second Division
- Iranian Second Tier
- Iranian Second Division

=== Alternative search names ===
- Azadegan League Iran
- Iran Azadegan
- Iranian League One
- Iran League One
- Iran Football League 1
- Iran Professional League 1
- Iranian Second-Level League

=== Historical context ===
The Azadegan League was established in 1991 as the highest level of Iranian football. Following the establishment of the Iran Pro League in 2001, the Azadegan League became the second tier of the Iranian football league system.

== History ==
=== Before 1970 ===
Before the 1970s, Iran did not have an official national football league. Most clubs participated in championships of their city or province. In 1970, the Local League was created. The league included teams from all Iran in different qualifying tournaments. In 1972, the Takht Jamshid Cup was founded as the national league and included teams from all over the country.

=== 1979 Revolution and 1980s ===
Due to the Islamic Revolution and the Iran–Iraq War, the Takht Jamshid Cup was dissolved and also the lower leagues were unorganized. In 1989 the Qods League was created as the national football league. Esteghlal were the first national champion since PAS Tehran in 1978. After the season the Qods League was not continued.

=== Establishment as First tier (1991–2001) ===
Azadegan League champions (First tier)
Season	Champions	Runners-up
1991–92	PAS Tehran	Esteghlal
1992–93	PAS Tehran	Persepolis
1993–94	Saipa	Persepolis
1994–95	Saipa	Esteghlal
1995–96	Persepolis	Bahman
1996–97	Persepolis	Bahman
1997–98	Esteghlal	PAS Tehran
1998–99	Persepolis	Esteghlal
1999–2000	Persepolis	Esteghlal
2000–01	Esteghlal	Persepolis

In 1991 the Azadegan League was formed as the top flight of Iranian football. The league was named as Azadegan League in honor of the Iranian prisoners of war who were released. Azadegan means the liberated in Persian. The league started with a format of 12 teams in the first season. In the 1992–93 Azadegan League season the league changed its format. 16 clubs participated in two groups of eight teams. PAS Tehran were the champions in both seasons. Esteghlal relegated for the first time in their history in 1993. Before the start of the 1993–94 season, the league changed its format again. 14 teams participated in one group. Saipa won the Azadegan League title, sitting three points of runners-up Persepolis. Only one year later the league format was changed again. 24 clubs participated in two groups of 12 teams. Saipa defended their title in final against Esteghlal.

Prior to the start of the 1995–96 Azadegan League season, the league changed its format again. 16 teams participated in one group until 1999. Persepolis were the champions in 1995–96, 1996–97 and 1998–99, while Esteghlal became the champion in the 1997–98 season. In 1999 the league was reduced to 14 teams. Persepolis won the 1999–2000 Azadegan League season, sitting seven points clear of rival Esteghlal. The 2000–01 season was the last year of the Azadegan League as the top-level football league of Iran. Esteghlal became the champion in a league of 12 teams.

=== Continuance as Second tier (2001–) ===
Azadegan League champions (Second tier)
Season	Champions	Runners-up
2001–02	Esteghlal Ahvaz	Sanat Naft
2002–03	Shamoushak	Pegah
2003–04	Saba Battery	Malavan
2004–05	Shahid Ghandi	Rah Ahan
2005–06	Mes Kerman	Paykan
2006–07	Shirin Faraz	Pegah
2007–08	Payam	Sepahan Novin
2008–09	Steel Azin	Shahin
2008–09	Tractor	Shahin
2009–10	Shahrdari Tabriz	Sanat Naft
2009–10	Naft Tehran	Sanat Naft
2010–11	Damash	Mes Sarcheshmeh
2011–12	Paykan	Aluminium Hormozgan
2012–13	Gostaresh Foolad	PAS Hamedan
2012–13	Esteghlal Khuzestan	PAS Hamedan
2013–14	Padideh	Naft M.I.S
2014–15	Foolad Novin	Siah Jamegan
2015–16	Paykan	Machine Sazi
2016–17	Pars Jonoubi	Sepidrood
2017–18	Naft M.I.S	Nassaji
2018–19	Gol Gohar	Shahin
2019–20	Mes Rafsanjan	Aluminium Arak
2020–21	Fajr Sepasi	Havadar
2021–22	Malavan	Mes Kerman
2022–23	Shams Azar	Esteghlal Khuzestan
2023–24	Kheybar	Chadormalou
2024–25	Fajr Sepasi	Paykan
2025–26	Nassaji	Mes Shahr-e Babak

After the Iran Pro League was established as the professional football league of Iran, Azadegan League was declared as the second-highest professional league in the Iranian football league system. Esteghlal Ahvaz won the 2001–02 Azadegan League season and promoted to Iran Pro League. Also Sanat Naft Abadan promoted to the Iran Pro League. 22 clubs participated in two groups of 11 teams including a final stage for the best four teams. The format was changed into a classic league of 16 teams for the next two seasons. Shamoushak Noshahr became the champion in 2002–03, while Saba Battery won the league title in the 2003–04 season.

Once more the league changed their format in 2004. Between the 2004–05 and 2007–08 Azadegan League season, 24 clubs played in two groups of 12 teams. After Shahid Ghandi winning the league in 2004–05, Mes Kerman became the champion in the 2005–06 season. Sanat Naft Abadan, the third-ranked team in 2004–05, criticized the Iranian Football Federation due to incidents in the final stage. In the 2006–07 Azadegan League season, Pegah and Shirin Faraz became the champions of the league, while Tractor failed once again for promotion. Also, Sanat Naft Abadan promoted automatically to the Persian Gulf Cup because of the 2004–05 Azadegan League promotion controversy.

After Payam Mashhad won the title in the 2007–08 Azadegan League season, the number of teams was increased to 28 before the start of the 2008–09 season. They played in two groups of 14 teams until 2013. East Azerbaijan club Tractor finally returned to the Persian Gulf Cup by winning the 2008–09 season alongside Steel Azin. Shahrdari Tabriz, and Naft Tehran were the champions in the 2009–10 season, before Damash won the league in 2010–11. Paykan won the league title 2011–12, while Gostaresh and Esteghlal Khuzestan won the league one year later. Although Shahrdari Tabriz could win their group, they were relegated due to match-fixing.

The number of teams was reduced in the next two seasons. 26 clubs participated in 2013–14, while 24 teams played in the 2014–15 season. Padideh won the title in 2013–14, with a victory over Naft Masjed Soleyman in the league final. One season later, Foolad Novin won the league after they beat Siah Jamegan in the final. Since Foolad Novin is the reserve team of Foolad Khuzestan, they could not be promoted to the Persian Gulf Pro League. Instead of Foolad Novin, Esteghlal Ahvaz was allowed to promote.

=== Since 2015 ===
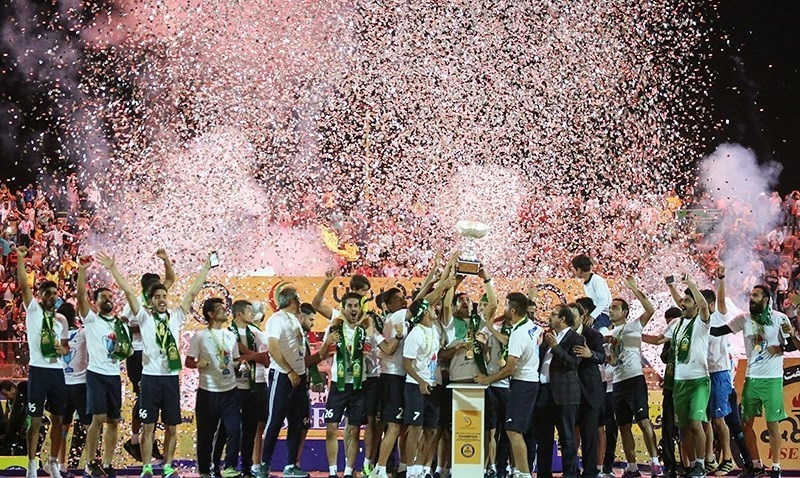
Pars Jonoubi Jam champions 2016–17

Before the start of the 2015–16 Azadegan League season, they returned to a classic league format. 20 clubs participated in 2015–16, before the number of teams were reduced to 18 one season later. Paykan won the 2015–16 season, sitting seven points clear of Machine Sazi.

Like in the 2016–17 season, Nassaj was also involved in a dramatic season finish in the 2017–18 Azadegan League. At the last matchday, five teams had the chance to promoted. Naft Masjed Soleyman drew 2–2 with Mes Rafsanjan and won the league, while Nassaji defeated Rah Ahan 6–0 in Tehran's Takhti Stadium and became runners-up with 64 points thanks to a better goal difference than Khooneh be Khooneh.

== Format ==
In the past, the format and number of teams were changed for various times. Since 2016, the league comprises 18 teams. Over the course of a season, which runs annually from July to the following May, each team plays twice against the others in the league, once at home and once away, resulting in each team competing in 34 games in total. Three points are awarded for a win, one for a draw and zero for a loss. The teams are ranked in the league table by points gained, then goal difference, then goals scored and then their head-to-head record for that season. At the end of the season, the top two teams are promoted to the Persian Gulf Pro League and the bottom three teams are relegated to League 2. Furthermore, all teams in the Azadegan League can participate in the Hazfi Cup.

Number of teams	Period
12	1991–92, 2000–01
16 (two groups)	1992–93
14	1993–94, 1999–2000
24 (two groups)	1994–95, 2004–05 until 2007–08, 2014–15
16	1995–96 until 1998–99, 2002–03 until 2003–04
22 (two groups)	2001–02
28 (two groups)	2008–09 until 2012–13
26 (two groups)	2013–14
24 (two groups)	2014–15
20	2015–16
18	since 2016–17

== Logo ==
Logo from 2014

== Champions ==
=== As 1st Tier league ===
Performance in the Azadegan League by club
Team	Champions	Runners-up
Persepolis	4 (1995–96, 1996–97, 1998–99, 1999–2000)	3 (1992–93, 1993–94, 2000–01)
Esteghlal	2 (1997–98, 2000–01)	4 (1991–92, 1994–95, 1998–99, 1999–2000)
PAS Tehran	2 (1991–92, 1992–93)	1 (1997–98)
Saipa	2 (1993–94, 1994–95)	—
Bahman	—	2 (1995–96, 1996–97)

=== As 2nd Tier league ===
Performance in the Azadegan League by club
Team	Champions	Runners-up
Paykan	2 (2011–12, 2015–16)	2 (2005–06, 2024-25)
Fajr Sepasi	2 (2020–21, 2024-25)	—
Damash	1 (2010–11)	2 (2002–03, 2006–07)
Naft Masjed Soleyman	1 (2017–18)	1 (2013–14)
Mes Kerman	1 (2005–06)	1 (2021–22)
Malavan	1 (2021–22)	1 (2003–04)
Esteghlal Khuzestan	1 (2012–13)	1 (2022–23)
Nassaji Mazandaran	1 (2025–26)	1 (2017–18)
Esteghlal Ahvaz	1 (2001–02)	—
Shamoushak Noshahr	1 (2002–03)	—
Saba Qom^{1}	1 (2003–04)	—
Shahid Ghandi Yazd^{2}	1 (2004–05)	—
Rahian Kermanshah^{3}	1 (2006–07)	—
Payam Mashhad	1 (2007–08)	—
Steel Azin^{4}	1 (2008–09)	—
Tractor^{5}	1 (2008–09)	—
Naft Tehran	1 (2009–10)	—
Shahrdari Tabriz	1 (2009–10)	—
Gostaresh Foulad	1 (2012–13)	—
Padideh^{6}	1 (2013–14)	—
Foolad Novin	1 (2014–15)	—
Pars Jonoubi Jam	1 (2016–17)	—
Gol Gohar	1 (2018–19)	—
Mes Rafsanjan	1 (2019–20)	—
Shams Azar Qazvin	1 (2022–23)	—
Kheybar Khorramabad	1 (2023–24)	—
Sanat Naft	—	2 (2001–02, 2009–10)
Shahin Bushehr	—	2 (2008–09, 2018–19)
Rah Ahan	—	1 (2004–05)
Sepahan Novin	—	1 (2007–08)
Aluminium Hormozgan	—	1 (2011–12)
Mes Sarcheshmeh	—	1 (2010–11)
PAS Hamedan	—	1 (2012–13)
Siah Jamegan	—	1 (2014–15)
Machine Sazi	—	1 (2015–16)
Sepidrood	—	1 (2016–17)
Aluminium Arak	—	1 (2019–20)
Havadar	—	1 (2020–21)
Chadormalou Ardakan	—	1 (2023–24)
Mes Shahr-e Babak	—	1 (2025–26)

Notes:
^{1} Saba Qom was formerly known as Saba Battery
^{2} Shahid Ghandi Yazd was known as Tarbiat Yazd between 2006 and 2015
^{3} Rahian Kermanshah was formerly known as Shirin Faraz
^{4} Steel Azin was formerly known as Ekbatan
^{5} Tractor was formerly known as Tractor Sazi
^{6} Padideh was known as Shahr Khodrou between 2019 and 2021

== All-time table ==
Pos.	Club	Seasons	Matches	Win	Draw	Loss	GF	GA	GD	Pts	Champions	Runners-up	Promoted	Relegated	Best Rank
1	Nassaji Mazandaran^{1}	19	494	172	152	170	526	540	−14	665	—	1	1	2	2nd
2	Mes Kerman	13	384	159	126	99	426	305	+121	603	1	1	2	—	1st
3	Sanat Naft	17	417	154	139	124	478	427	+51	601	—	2	4	2	2nd
4	Aluminium Arak^{2}	16	436	143	148	145	455	465	−10	577	—	1	1	2	2nd
5	Malavan^{3}	14	404	143	144	117	401	347	+54	567	1	1	2	2	1st
6	Fajr Sepasi	13	390	145	131	114	427	329	+98	566	2	—	3	—	1st
7	Tractor Sazi	16	392	143	131	118	448	414	+34	560	1	1	1	1	1st
8	Machine Sazi	17	463	129	146	188	470	616	−146	533	—	1	2	4	2nd
9	Mes Rafsanjan	13	367	133	129	105	430	344	+86	528	1	—	1	—	1st
10	Gol Gohar	12	333	120	121	92	399	337	+62	481	1	—	1	—	1st
11	Persepolis	9	222	122	71	29	368	167	+201	437	4	3	—	—	1st
12	Payam Mashhad^{4}	12	305	102	106	97	353	350	+3	409	1	—	1	3	1st
13	Esteghlal	9	224	108	77	39	328	194	+134	401	2	4	—	1	1st
14	PAS Tehran	10	250	94	106	50	304	227	+77	388	2	1	—	—	1st
15	Damash Gilan^{5}	10	263	105	73	85	290	252	+38	388	1	1	3	2	1st
16	Esteghlal Ahvaz	13	330	90	109	131	352	429	−77	379	1	—	2	3	1st
17	Iranjavan	11	300	89	103	108	317	347	−30	370	—	1	—	2	2nd
18	Niroye Zamini	12	300	89	92	119	283	333	−50	359	—	—	—	4	3rd
19	Saipa	9	250	83	106	61	287	244	+43	355	2	—	—	1	1st
20	Sepahan	9	236	87	79	70	250	230	+20	340	—	—	—	1	3rd
21	Rayka Babol^{6}	7	238	80	87	71	243	221	+22	327	—	—	—	—	5th
28	Esteghlal Khuzestan	6	186	72	62	52	202	141	+61	278	1	1	2	—	1st
34	Zob Ahan	7	184	60	71	53	217	204	+13	251	—	—	—	1	3rd
35	Kheybar Khorramabad	5	172	59	64	49	189	158	+31	241	1	—	1	—	1st
41	Pars Jonoubi Jam	4	134	53	46	35	130	115	+15	205	1	—	1	—	1st
42	Paykan	4	110	55	35	20	157	90	+67	200	2	2	4	—	1st
43	Khooshe Talaei	4	134	49	46	39	151	125	+26	193	—	—	—	—	4th
47	Arman Gohar Sirjan	4	134	49	39	46	157	157	0	186	—	—	—	—	3rd
52	Foolad	5	128	45	36	47	146	157	−11	171	—	—	1	—	3rd
54	Havadar^{15}	3	98	42	32	24	135	99	+36	168	—	1	1	—	2nd
63	Chooka Talesh	5	142	30	43	69	130	229	−99	133	—	—	—	3	6th
65	Esteghlal Mollasani	3	100	26	47	27	97	112	-15	125	—	—	—	—	8th
69	Shams Azar Qazvin	2	66	32	18	16	104	59	+45	114	1	—	1	—	1st
71	Shahrdari Astara	3	100	27	32	41	75	99	−24	113	—	—	—	—	11th
77	Mes Shahr-e Babak	2	66	20	31	15	54	43	+11	91	—	—	—	—	7th
83	Pas Hamedan	2	66	15	26	25	43	54	-11	71	—	—	—	1	10th
95	Navad Urmia	1	32	12	9	11	32	29	+3	45	—	—	—	—	7th
96	Chadormalou Ardakan	1	32	11	12	9	32	31	+1	45	—	1	1	—	2nd
100	Be'sat Kermanshah	1	32	8	14	10	26	25	+1	38	—	—	—	—	10th

2025–26 Persian Gulf Pro League
2025–26 Azadegan League
Dissolved

Notes:
Only league matches, Play-offs are not included in the all-time table
^{1} Nassaji Mazandaran was deducted three points in the 2012–13 season
^{2} Aluminium Arak was formerly known as PAS Arak, Shensa Arak, Hamyari Arak and Shahrdari Arak
^{3} Malavan was deducted six points in the 2018–19 season
^{4} Payam Mashhad was deducted three points in the 2010–11 season
^{5} Damash Gilan was formerly known as Esteghlal Rasht and Pegah Gilan
^{6} Rayka Babol was formerly known as Khooneh be Khooneh

== Attendances ==
=== Average league attendances ===
Season	Average	Highest attended club	Club average	Lowest attended club	Club average
2008–09	3,075	Tractor	9,385	Niroye Zamini	319
2009–10	2,667	Nassaji Mazandaran	11,833	Foolad Novin	192
2010–11	2,733	Nassaji Mazandaran	12,769	Sanati Kaveh	188
2011–12	2,350	Naft Masjed Soleyman	9,091	Sanati Kaveh	200
2015–16	2,539	Nassaji Mazandaran	8,931	Parseh Tehran	120
2016–17	2,650	Nassaji Mazandaran	10,333	Rah Ahan	188
2017–18	2,287	Nassaji Mazandaran	12,941	Machine Sazi	247

Notes:
Matches with spectator bans are not included in average attendances

=== Highest attended season matches ===
Season	Home team	Score	Away team	Attendance	Date	Week	Stadium
2008–09	Tractor	2–0	Aluminium Hormozgan	20,000	8 June 2009	26	Sahand
2009–10	Nassaji	4–1	Damash	15,000	13 November 2009	6	Vatani
2010–11	Gostaresh	1–0	Aboumoslem	30,000	9 May 2011	26	Sahand
2011–12	Nassaji	0–0	Naft MIS	15,000	5 April 2012	24	Vatani
2015–16	Machine Sazi	3–0	Mes Rafsanjan	15,500	10 May 2016	37	Sahand
2016–17	Sepidrood	3–2	Nassaji	20,000	1 May 2017	34	Dr. Azodi
2017–18	Rah Ahan	0–6	Nassaji	23,000	29 April 2018	34	Takhti Tehran

== Statistics ==
=== Top scorers ===
Season	Player	Club	Goals
2005–06	(Iran) Hossein Abdi	Sanaye Arak	14
2006–07	(Iran) Farhad Kheirkhah	Sorkhpooshan	11
2007–08	(Iran) Mohammad Parvin	Steel Azin	15
2008–09	(Iran) Abbas Porkhosravani	Gol Gohar	17
2009–10	(Iran) Ali Karimi	Shahrdari Tabriz	17
2010–11	(Iran) Afshin Chavoshi	Damash	13
2010–11	(Iran) Mostafa Shojaei	Foolad Natanz	13
2010–11	(Iran) Moslem Firoozabadi	Gol Gohar	13
2011–12	(Iran) Bahman Tahmasebi	Aluminum	13
2012–13	(Iran) Mohammad Abbaszadeh	Nassaji	17
2013–14	(Iran) Mokhtar Jomehzadeh	Gol Gohar	15
2014–15	(Iran) Issa Alekasir	Aluminum	11
2015–16	(Iran) Hamid Kazemi	Nassaji	16
2016–17	(Iran) Mohammad Abbaszadeh	Nassaji	24
2017–18	(Iran) Farshid Padash	Shahrdari Mahshahr	17
2017–18	(Iran) Shahin Majidi	Fajr Sepasi	17
2018–19	(Iran) Peyman Ranjbari	Gol Gohar	16
2018–19	(Iran) Shahriyar Moghanlou	Paykan	16
2019–20	(Iran) Hamid Kazemi	Baadraan	17
2020–21	(Iran) Aref Rostami	Kheybar Khorramabad	17

== See also ==
- Football in Iran
- Iranian football league system
- Persian Gulf Pro League
- League 2
- League 3
- Hazfi Cup
- Iranian Super Cup
