= Bargh Tehran F.C. =

Iranian football club

Bargh Tehran برق تهران
- Full name: Bargh Tehran Football Club
- Founded: 1950; 75 years ago
- Ground: Harandi
- Capacity: 10,000
- League: Tehran Province League
- Website: https://barghsport.com/
| Home colours | Away colours |

Bargh Tehran Football Club (Persian: باشگاه فوتبال برق تهران, Bashgah-e Futbal-e Bargh-e Tehran), commonly known as Bargh Tehran, is an Iranian football club based in capital Tehran, that competes in the Tehran Province League. The club was founded in 1950 and is part of the multisport club Bargh Tehran Culture & Sport Institute (Persian: مؤسسه فرهنگی ورزشی برق تهران).

The football team plays its home games at the Harandi Stadium which has a seating capacity of 10,000. The club is owned and supported by the Tehran Province Electricity Distribution Company.

top players 1982 : Majid Holekian - Javad Mahmodi - Hamid Nazemi (Invited to national team ) He also played for Turkish team in 1983 and also played for Germany

== See also ==
- Bargh Shiraz
