= List of Tractor S.C. managers =

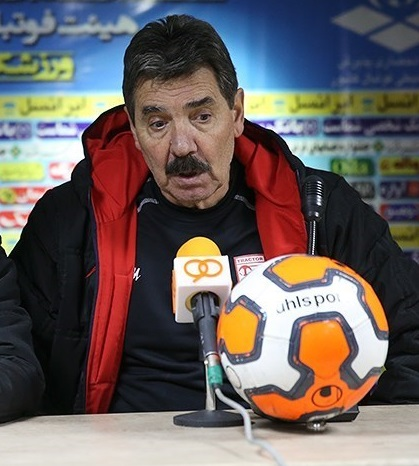
Toni is the most iconic manager in the Tractor history.

Ever since its foundation, Tractor has had 30 managers, which 4 were interim and 6 held the job on more than one time. The first one was Mohammad Bayati and the current manager is Faraz Kamalvand.

== Managerial history ==
Below is a list of Tractor coaches from 1970 until the present day.

Table headers

- Nationality – The coach's nationality is given as his country of birth.
- From – The date the coach began working for Tractor.
- To – The date the coach last worked for Tractor.
- Honours – The trophies won while coaching Tractor.

Manager	Nationality	From	To	Honours	Notes
Mohammad Bayati	Iran	November 2, 1970	October 15, 1975	1 Pasargard League	
Hossein Fekri	Iran	October 15, 1975	July 15, 1977	1 Pasargard League (RU); 1 Hazfi Cup (RU)	
Unknown		October 15, 1977	June 3, 1980		
Hedayat Mahabadpour	Iran	June 3, 1980	January 15, 1990		
Vasile Godja	Romania	January 15, 1990	August 19, 1997	1 2nd Division (RU); 1 Hazfi Cup (RU); 1 Super Cup; 2 SSI Cup; 1 MI Cup	
Mohammad Hossein Ziaei	Iran	August 19, 1997	January 14, 1998		(Note: Acted as player-coach)
Boris Tibilov	Russia	January 14, 1998	June 2, 1998		
Firouz Karimi	Iran	June 2, 1998	May 2, 1999		
Sattar Nobari	Iran	May 2, 1999	July 1, 1999		(Note: Caretaker or interim manager)
Mohammad Hossein Ziaei	Iran	July 1, 1999	July 5, 2000		
Reza Vatankhah	Iran	July 5, 2000	June 2, 2001		
Sattar Nobari	Iran	June 2, 2001	June 15, 2001		
Mahmoud Yavari	Iran	June 15, 2001	June 14, 2002		
Ahad Sheykhlari	Iran	June 15, 2002	June 1, 2003		
Vasile Godja	Romania	June 1, 2003	December 3, 2003		
Hamid Alidousti	Iran	December 3, 2003	June 12, 2004		
Mohammad Hossein Ziaei	Iran	June 12, 2004	October 4, 2004		
Ernst Middendorp	Germany	October 4, 2004	July 2, 2005		
Farshad Pious	Iran	July 2, 2005	July 1, 2007	1 Azadegan League	
Ahad Sheykhlari	Iran	July 1, 2007	July 1, 2008		
Faraz Kamalvand	Iran	July 1, 2008	July 1, 2011	1 Azadegan League	
Amir Ghalenoei	Iran	July 1, 2011	June 1, 2012	1 Iran Pro League (RU)	
Toni	Portugal	June 1, 2012	May 13, 2013	1 Iran Pro League (RU)	
Hassan Azarnia	Iran	May 13, 2013	June 1, 2013		
Majid Jalali	Iran	June 1, 2013	January 19, 2014		
Gholamreza Baghabadi	Iran	January 19, 2014	January 28, 2014		
Toni	Portugal	January 28, 2014	May 31, 2014	1 Hazfi Cup	
Rasoul Khatibi	Iran	June 1, 2014	February 8, 2015		
Toni	Portugal	February 13, 2015	December 8, 2015	1 Iran Pro League (RU)	
Amir Ghalenoei	Iran	December 9, 2015	May 12, 2017	1 Hazfi Cup (RU)	
Yahya Golmohammadi	Iran	May 24, 2017	January 16, 2018		
Mojtaba Hosseini	Iran	January 16, 2018	January 20, 2018		
Ertuğrul Sağlam	Turkey	January 20, 2018	April 30, 2018		
John Toshack	Wales	June 9, 2018	September 16, 2018		
Mohammad Taghavi	Iran	September 16, 2018	January 14, 2019		
Georges Leekens	Belgium	January 14, 2019	May 23, 2019		
Mustafa Denizli	Turkey	June 13, 2019	December 7, 2019		
Saket Elhami	Iran	December 20, 2019	September 16, 2020	1 Hazfi Cup	
Alireza Mansourian	Iran	September 17, 2020	December 8, 2020		
Rasoul Khatibi	Iran	February 1, 2021	June 28, 2021		
Firouz Karimi	Iran	June 28, 2021	August 1, 2021		
Faraz Kamalvand	Iran	August 1, 2021	September 9, 2021		
Firouz Karimi	Iran	September 10, 2021	November 5, 2021		
Zvonimir Soldo	Croatia	November 14, 2021	February 26, 2022		
Ertuğrul Sağlam	Turkey	February 28, 2022	June 15, 2022		
Kurban Berdyev	Turkmenistan	June 16, 2022	November 23, 2022		
Paco Jemez	Spain	December 6, 2022	November 12, 2024		
Dragan Skočić	Croatia	July 9, 2024	Present	1 Iran Pro League	
