= List of Saba Qom F.C. seasons =

This is a list of seasons played by Saba Qom F.C. in Iranian and Asian football, from 2002 to the most recent completed season. It details the club's achievements in major competitions, and the top scorers for each season. Top scorers in bold were also the top scorers in the Iranian league that season.

== Seasons ==
24
Season	League									Hazfi Cup	ACL Elite	Leagues Top goalscorer		Manager(s)
Season	Division	P	W	D	L	F	A	Pts	Pos	Hazfi Cup	ACL Elite	Name(s)	Goals	Manager(s)
2002–03	Div 1	30	11	11	08	32	25	44	6th		Did not enter			Mazloomi
2003–04	Div 1	30	18	09	03	54	28	63	1st		Did not qualify			Mazloomi
2004–05	IPL	30	08	11	11	38	40	35	9th	**Champion**	Did not qualify	Ali Daei	11	Živadinović
2005–06	IPL	30	13	11	06	35	31	50	4th	Semifinal	Group stage	Ali Daei	11	Jalali/ Ziaei
2006–07	IPL	30	07	11	12	28	31	32	13th	Runner-up	Did not qualify	Alen Avdić	6	Kazemi/ Ziaei
2007–08	IPL	34	13	13	08	41	37	52	3rd	1/8 Final	Did not qualify	Fereydoon Fazli	12	Ziaei/ Golmohammadi
2008–09	IPL	34	11	18	05	45	34	51	6th	Semifinal	Group Stage	Fereydoon Fazli	14	Firouz Karimi
2009–10	IPL	34	13	09	12	52	45	48	6th	Quarter-Final	Did not qualify	Davoud Haghi	13	Ziaei/ Korbekandi
2010–11	IPL	34	09	14	11	39	40	41	10th	Round of 32	Did not qualify	Mohsen Bayatinia	8	Yavari/ Veisi
2011–12	IPL	34	12	14	8	40	38							
50	4th	Quarter-Final	Did not qualify	Reza Enayati	18	Veisi								
2012–13	IPL	34	10	15	9	37	33							
45	9th	Round of 16	Play-off	Farid Karimi	6	Golmohammadi/ Marfavi								
2013–14	IPL	30	8	9	13	32	38	33	9th	Round of 32	Did not qualify	Reza Enayati	13	Mayeli Kohan/ Marfavi
2014–15	IPL	30	8	10	12	25	34	34	9th	Round of 32	Did not qualify	Ayoub Kalantari	5	Tartar

=== Key ===
- P = Played
- W = Games won
- D = Games drawn
- L = Games lost
- F = Goals for
- A = Goals against
- Pts = Points
- Pos = Final position
- IPL = Iran Pro League
- Div 1 = Azadegan League
- ACL Elite = AFC Champions League Elite

Champions	Runners-up	Promoted

== See also ==
- Saba Qom F.C.
- Takht Jamshid Cup
- Azadegan League
- Iran Pro League
- Hazfi Cup
