= Rasoul Khatibi =

Iranian footballer and coach (born 1978)

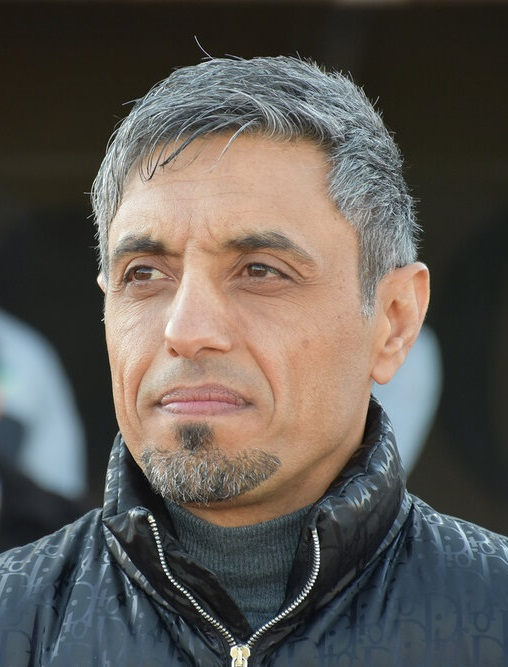
- Khatibi in 2021 as Aluminium Arak manager

Personal information
- Full name: Rasoul Paki Khatibi
- Date of birth: 22 September 1978 (age 48)
- Place of birth: Tabriz, Iran
- Height: 1.72 m (5 ft 8 in)
- Position: Forward

Team information
- Current team: Fajr Sepasi (manager)

Youth career
- 1993–1996: Machine Sazi

Senior career*
Years	Team	Apps	(Gls)
1996–1997	Tractor		
1997–1999	Pas		
1999–2000	Hamburger SV	4	(0)
2000	→ Esteghlal (loan)	0	(0)
2000–2003	Pas		(16)
2003	→ Esteghlal (loan)	0	(0)
2003–2006	Sepahan	67	(32)
2006–2007	Sharjah		(12)
2007–2008	Emirates	22	(14)
2008–2009	Dhafra		(2)
2009	Sepahan	8	(0)
2009–2011	Gostaresh	36	(16)
2010	→ Tractor (loan)	11	(2)
2011–2012	Machine Sazi	3	(2)
2012–2013	Gostaresh	12	(5)

International career
1999	Iran U23	4	(3)
1998–2008	Iran	27	(5)

Managerial career
- 2011–2012: Machine Sazi (player-manager)
- 2012–2014: Gostaresh Foolad
- 2014–2015: Tractor
- 2015: Siah Jamegan
- 2015–2017: Machine Sazi
- 2019–2020: Machine Sazi
- 2020–2021: Aluminium Arak
- 2021: Tractor
- 2021–2023: Aluminium Arak
- 2023: Paykan
- 2024–2025: Shams Azar (assistant)
- 2025: Mes Rafsanjan
- 2026–: Fajr Sepasi
Medal record
Representing Iran
Asian Games
Gold medal – first place	1998 Bangkok	Team competition
- * Club domestic league appearances and goals

Rasoul Paki Khatibi (Persian: رسول خطیبی; born 22 September 1978) is an Iranian football coach and former player who is the manager of the Persian Gulf Pro League team Fajr Sepasi.

== Club career ==
Khatibi began his professional football career, playing for his hometown club, Tractor, following the footsteps of his brother, Hossein Khatibi. After scoring many goals for his club, he was transferred to Pas Tehran. He remained in Tehran for over a year before he transferred to Hamburger SV in the Bundesliga along with fellow Iranian internationals Mehdi Mahdavikia and Vahid Hashemian.

While playing in Hamburg, he did not make many appearances. He soon returned to Iran, back to his old club, Pas Tehran. He then briefly played for Esteghlal in the Asian Champions League before signing for Sepahan. Sepahan was able to win the IPL championship in 2003 and Khatibi started showing his good form again. He scored ten goals in the 2005–06 season, completing his impressive record in Sepahan with 32 goals in three seasons. In June 2006, he signed a two-year contract with United Arab Emirates club Sharjah FC, after rejecting an offer from Spanish second division side CD Tenerife. In 2007, Khatibi signed a new contract with Emirates Club for $700,000 to join his Iranian teammate Reza Enayati. The contract had a clause which stated that if a European club offered Khatibi a contract, then the existing contract with Emirates Club would be canceled. He then joined Gostaresh Foulad as player-manager. He announced his retirement on 5 August 2013.

== International career ==
Khatibi represented Iran internationally at various age levels. He was a constant member of the Iran Olympic team during his time in Tractor Sazi and Pas, but despite the talent on the team, they were never successful. He gained his first international cap on 15 February 1999 versus Kuwait. He was called up to the Iran national football team for 2006 World Cup. He has 24 caps and five goals for the national team.

== Coaching career ==
After he joined Machine Sazi Tabriz in summer 2011, he became player-manager on 1 July 2011, and went on to lead the team in the Azadegan league. After spending one season at Machine Sazi resulting in a third place finish and a loss in the promotion play-off on goal difference, he became head coach of fellow Tabrizi team Gostaresh Foolad. He led the club to promotion to the Iran Pro League. He renewed his contract for another three seasons on 13 May 2013 but resigned on 26 December 2013 after a run of unsuccessful results.

On 31 May 2014, Khatibi was appointed as new manager of Tractor, replacing Toni. He signed a three-year contract with the club. However, he was sacked on 8 February 2015 after a run of poor results.

== Career statistics ==
=== Club ===
Appearances and goals by club, season and competition
Club	Season	League			Cup		Continental		Total	
Club	Season	Division	Apps	Goals	Apps	Goals	Apps	Goals	Apps	Goals
Hamburger SV	1998–99	Bundesliga	4	0	0	0	–		4	0
Esteghlal (loan)	1999–2000	Azadegan League	0	0	0	0	–		0	0
Pas	2000–01	Azadegan League	14	6	0	0	–		14	6
Pas	2000–02	Iran Pro League	18	8	0	0	–		18	8
Pas	2002–03	Iran Pro League	11	2	2	0	–		13	2
Pas	Total		43	16	2	0	0	0	45	16
Esteghlal (loan)	2002–03	Iran Pro League	0	0	0	0	3	2	3	2
Sepahan	2003–04	Iran Pro League	19	8	0	0	6	2	25	10
Sepahan	2004–05	Iran Pro League	27	14	0	0	6	4	33	18
Sepahan	2005–06	Iran Pro League	21	10	1	0	–		22	10
Sepahan	Total		67	32	1	0	12	6	80	38
Sharjah	2006–07	UAE Pro-League	21	12	0	0	–		21	12
Emirates	2007–08	UAE Pro-League	22	14	0	0	–		22	14
Al Dhafra FC	2008–09	UAE Pro-League	9	2	0	0	–		9	2
Sepahan	2008–09	Persian Gulf Cup	8	0	1	0	6	1	15	1
Gostaresh	2009–10	Division 1	23	12	3	3	–		26	15
Gostaresh	2010–11	Division 1	13	4	1	0	–		14	4
Gostaresh	Total		36	16	4	3	0	0	40	19
Tractor (loan)	2010–11	Persian Gulf Cup	11	2	0	0	–		11	2
Machine Sazi	2011–12	Division 1	3	2	1	1	–		4	3
Gostaresh	2012–13	Division 1	10	5	0	0	–		10	5
Gostaresh	2013–14	Iran Pro League	1	0	0	0	–		1	0
Gostaresh	Total		11	5	0	0	0	0	11	5
Career total			352	101	9	4	21	9	352	101

== Managerial statistics ==
As of 20 June 2021

Team	From	To	Record							
Team	From	To	M	W	D	L	GF	GA	GD	Win %
Machine Sazi	July 2011	July 2012	28	12	8	8	35	28	+7	42.86
Gostaresh	July 2012	January 2014	47	19	16	12	66	47	+19	40.43
Tractor	May 2014	February 2015	22	11	5	6	41	26	+15	50.00
Siah Jamegan	June 2015	August 2015	4	1	0	3	2	4	−2	25.00
Machine Sazi	November 2015	December 2016	53	19	18	16	75	61	+14	35.85
Machine Sazi	July 2017	December 2017	15	4	5	6	12	15	−3	26.67
Machine Sazi	June 2019	January 2020	17	6	5	6	17	19	−2	35.29
Aluminium Arak	January 2020	February 2021	32	16	11	5	41	24	+17	50.00
Tractor	February 2021	June 2021	16	4	9	3	14	13	+1	25.00
Total			234	92	77	65	303	237	+66	39.32

== Honours ==
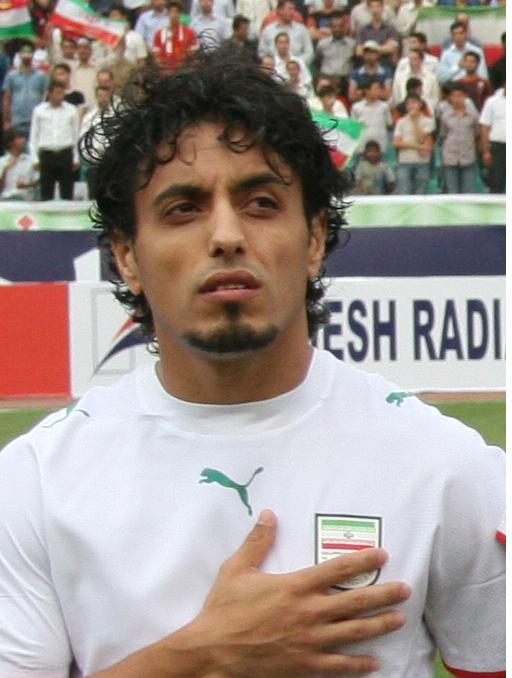
Rasoul Khatibi

=== As a player ===
Pas

- Iran Pro League runner-up: 1997–98

Esteghlal

- Iran Pro League runner-up: 1999–00
- Hazfi Cup: 1999–00

Sepahan

- Hazfi Cup: 2003–04, 2005–06

Gostaresh

- Hazfi Cup runner-up: 2009–10

=== As a manager ===
Gostaresh

- Azadegan League: 2012–13

Tractor

- Shohada Cup: 2014

Machine Sazi

- Azadegan League runner-up (promotion): 2015–16

Aluminium Arak

- Azadegan League runner-up (promotion): 2019–20

=== Individual ===
- Azadegan League Manager of the Season: 2015–16
