= Gholamreza Baghabadi =

Iranian footballer and coach

Personal information
- Full name: Gholamreza Baghabadi
- Date of birth: 26 May 1958 (age 68)
- Place of birth: Tabriz, Iran
- Position: Defender

Team information
- Current team: Machine Sazi (assistant)

Youth career
- 1975–1979: Machine Sazi

Senior career*
| Years | Team | Apps | (Gls) |
| 1979–1990 | Machine Sazi | | |
| 1990–1992 | Saipa | | |

International career
| 1984–1989 | Iran | | |

Managerial career
- 2006–2007: Machine Sazi
- 2007–2008: Machine Sazi
- 2008–2010: Saipa (assistant)
- 2011–2014: Tractor Sazi (assistant)
- 2014: Tractor Sazi (caretaker)
- 2014–2015: Machine Sazi
- 2015–2016: Shahrdari Tabriz
- 2016–2017: Foolad (assistant)
- 2017–2018: Iran U-23 (assistant)
- 2019–: Machine Sazi (assistant)
- * Club domestic league appearances and goals

Gholamreza Baghabadi (Persian: غلامرضا باغ آبادی, born 26 May 1958 in Tabriz, Iran) is a retired Iranian professional football player and coach. He was also interim manager of Tractor Sazi from 19 to 28 January 2014 after the resignation of Majid Jalali. He is assistant manager of Foolad Khuzestan in Persian Gulf Pro League.

== Statistics ==
As of 28 January 2014

| Team | From | To | Record | | | | | | | |
| Team | From | To | G | W | D | L | Win % | GF | GA | +/- |
|---|---|---|---|---|---|---|---|---|---|---|
| Tractor Sazi (interim) | January 2014 | January 2014 | 3 | 1 | 2 | 0 | 33.33 | 3 | 1 | +2 |
