= Alireza Nikmehr =

Iranian footballer

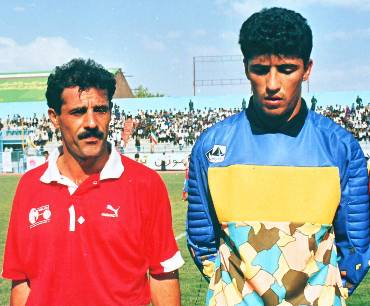
- Alireza Nikmehr (Right) & Ahad Sheykhlari (Left) in Baghshomal Stadium

Personal information
- Date of birth: 1972
- Place of birth: Tabriz, Iran
- Date of death: 2003 (aged 30–31)
- Place of death: Tabriz, Iran
- Position: Goalkeeper

Youth career
- Tractor

Senior career*
Years	Team	Apps	(Gls)
1993–2000	Tractor	?	(0)
- * Club domestic league appearances and goals as of 27 May 2015

Alireza Nikmehr (Persian: علیرضا نیک‌مهر, born 1972 in Tabriz — died 2003 in Tabriz) was an Iranian footballer who played for Tractor S.C. as a goalkeeper.
