= Machine Sazi F.C. =

Iranian association football club

Machine Sazi ماشین‌سازی
- Full name: Machine Sazi Tabriz Football Club
- Nickname: The Green Machine (Persian: ماشین سبز)
- Founded: 1969
- Dissolved: 2022
- Owner: Younes Ghorbani
- Chairman: Seyyed Mohammad Alavi
- Head Coach: Alireza Akbarpour
- League: League 3 (Iran)
- 2021–22: Azadegan League 18th (relegated)
- Website: http://www.mst-club.ir/
Home colours	Away colours

Machine Sazi Tabriz Football Club (Persian: باشگاه فوتبال ماشین‌سازی تبریز, Bashgah-e Futbal-e Mashinsazi-ye Tebriz) more commonly known as Machine Sazi was an Iranian professional football club based in Tabriz, East Azarbaijan, Iran competing in the Azadegan League.

== Club history ==
=== Establishment ===
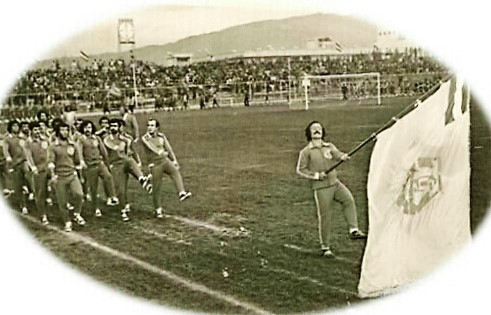
Machine Sazi's players in a parade in Bagh Shomal Stadium, 1969

In 1969, Machine Sazi Tabriz Industrial Group decided to create a new football team by the name of Machine Sazi. Machine Sazi Tabriz football club played its first official match in 1970.

In 1973, the Takht Jamshid Cup was established. The Takht Jamshid Cup, was Iran's first ever nationwide football league and Machine Sazi entered the league in its first year of establishment in 1973. The club participated in Takht Jamshid Cup between 1973 and 1977.

=== Post Revolution ===
==== 1980s ====
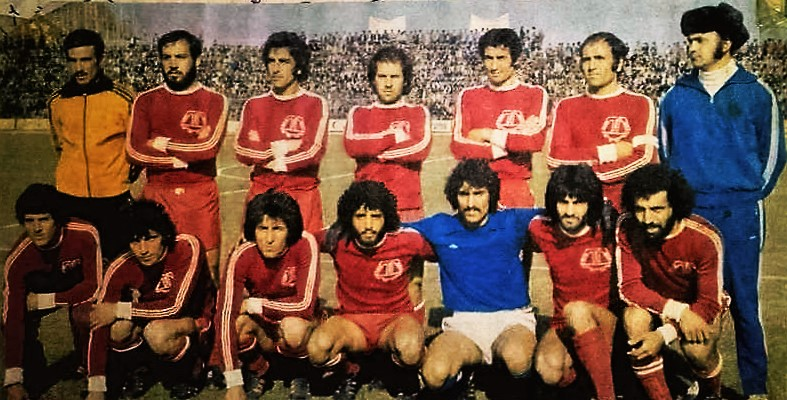
Machine Sazi players with red colours during 1973–74 Takht Jamshid Cup. Later, the team's colours was changed to yellow, blue and then green

Like most sporting clubs in Iran, the Revolution and the Iran–Iraq War severely limited the team's activities. From 1979 to 1980 the club participated in almost no meaningful competitions.

In 1980 the Tabriz Football League and Tabriz Hazfi Cup was established. Machine Sazi participated in the Tabriz Football League and Tabriz Hazfi Cup between 1980 and 1988. Machine Sazi was the most successful Tabriz Football League club, winning seven championship titles and finishing two times as runners-up. The club also won the Tabriz Hazfi Cup six times. After the war the local and provincial leagues were scrapped in favor of nationwide leagues.

==== 1990s ====
After the war, the Azadegan League was established as Iran's national league. Machine Sazi was promoted to the Azadegan League in 1994. They stayed in the Azadegan League for two seasons and the club finished 8th the following year. But, in 1997 the club was relegated to the 2nd Division. Machine Sazi played in the 2nd Division between 1997 and 2001 until the Iran Pro League was formed.

==== 2000s ====
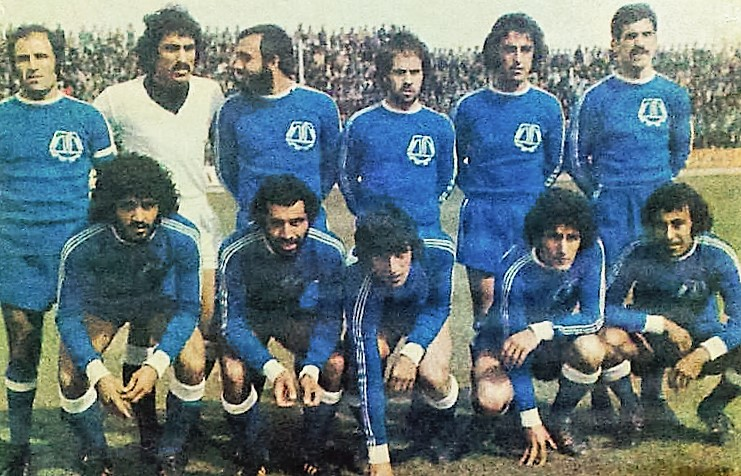
Machine Sazi players in 1976

With the launch of Iran Pro League in 2001, Machine Sazi were placed into the Azadegan League. After a 3rd-place finish in the new Azadegan League's inaugural season, Machine Sazi had a string of mid table finishes. In the 2007–08 season the club finished 11th in the Azadegan League and was relegated to 2nd Division but following the Iranian Football Federations' decision to increase the number of teams in the league to 28, Machine Sazi remained in the Azadegan League.

The club had a mixed start to the 2008–09 season in the Azadegan League. 2008 heralded major changes for Machine Sazi, as the terrible state of the club's finances was revealed; they were unable to pay wages and had massive debts. After a drop in form, recording 10 losses in 12 matches, Asghar Etebari was sacked as manager and was replaced by Sirous Bayrami. In March 2008 Javad Shahlaei resigned as chairman and Farhad Sedaghat was elected chairman by the club council. Seyed Javad Mousavi was brought in as the new club manager. Machine Sazi finished 13th in the 2008–09 Azadegan League season. Thus, being relegated to 2nd Division.

==== Dabiri Takeover ====
On 25 April 2009 the club was bought by businessman Shahram Dabiri. After a year in the 2nd Division, Machine Sazi bought the licence of a club in the Azadegan League and was allowed to compete in the 2010–11 edition of the league. Following a 3rd-place finish in 2012 which almost brought the club back to the Iran Pro League, the club was again relegated to the 2nd Division in 2013. Machine Sazi escaped relegation to the 3rd Division the following year via a relegation play–off.

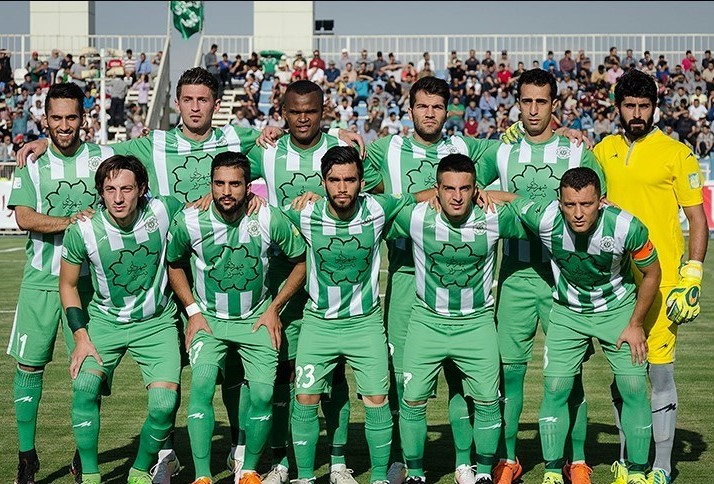
Machine Sazi Players, 2016.

=== Persian Gulf Pro League ===
Following Machine Sazi's dismal 2013–14 season the team was taken over by the Municipality of Tabriz.

In June 2015 Machine Sazi replaced Shahrdari Tabriz in the 2015–16 Azadegan League as East Azerbaijan's representative. In winter of 2016 Rasoul Khatibi was named head coach of Machine Sazi and the club began the push for promotion to the Persian Gulf Pro League. On 10 May 2016 after a 3–0 win against Mes Rafsanjan, Machine Sazi confirmed their promotion to the Persian Gulf Pro League after a 19-year absence from the top flight of Iranian football. Machine Sazi managed to draw 1–1 with Esteghlal at the Azadi Stadium in week 5.

Khatibi was fired midway through the season for Machine's bad performances and was replaced with Farhad Kazemi. Machine Sazi finished the season in last place and were relegated to the Azadegan League once again. In the season of 2018–19, the club replaced the Gostaresh Foulad and returned to the top flight.

== Players ==
=== First Team Squad ===
Note: Flags indicate national team as defined under FIFA eligibility rules; some limited exceptions apply. Players may hold more than one non-FIFA nationality.

No.	Pos.	Nation	Player
1	GK	IRN	Mohammad Bagher Sadeghi
2	DF	IRN	Fardin Abedini
3	DF	IRN	Ali Jalilzadeh
4	DF	IRN	Meysam Bagheri
5	DF	IRN	Bahman Kamel
6	DF	IRN	Mohammad Rasoul Goudarzi
7	MF	IRN	Babak Alizadeh
8	MF	IRN	Amir Shahsavari
9	FW	IRN	Mohammad Hossein Bayrami
10	FW	IRN	Zabihollah Kohkan
11	FW	IRN	Akbar Khodadadeh

No.	Pos.	Nation	Player
13	GK	IRN	Aliraza Jafarpour
14	MF	IRN	Amirreza Bakhshi
15	DF	IRN	Majid Eydi
16	MF	IRN	Alireza Nadimi
17	FW	IRN	Fardin Seyfipour
18	FW	IRN	Mohammad Aboutorabi
19	DF	IRN	Amirreza Najafizadeh
20	MF	IRN	Meysam Namvar
21	GK	IRN	Amir Faal
22	GK	IRN	Erfan Akrami
23	MF	IRN	Sadigh Barani

For recent transfers, see List of Iranian football transfers winter 2022-23.

== League and domestic cup history ==
Season	League	Pos.	Pl.	W	D	L	GS	GA	P	Hazfi Cup	Notes
1971–72	Local League	3	3	1	1	1	3	3	3	not held	3rd place(Region A)
1973–74	Takht Jamshid Cup	12	22	1	5	16	11	48	8	not held	Relegated
1974–75	2nd Division	6	22	8	5	10	30	29	29	not held	
1975–76	2nd Division	1	6	5	1	0	10	4	11	1/8 finals	Promoted
1976–77	Takht Jamshid Cup	9	30	8	16	6	23	23	32	1/16 finals	
1977–78	Takht Jamshid Cup	10	30	9	10	11	20	23	28	not held	
1978–79	Takht Jamshid Cup	11	12	4	4	4	11	15	12	not held	until week 12
1980–81	Tabriz Football League	2	9	6	2	1	19	10	14	not held	
1981–82	Tabriz Football League	1	10	8	2	0	19	5	18	not held	
1982–83	Tabriz Football League	3	11	4	4	3	17	6	12	not held	
1983–84	Tabriz Football League	2	10	6	3	1	12	6	15	not held	
1984–85	Tabriz Football League	1	11	10	1	0	29	10	21	not held	
1985–86	Tabriz Football League	1	20	16	1	4	39	30	49	not held	
1986–87	Tabriz Football League	1	20	17	2	1	30	15	53	Third Round	
1987–88	Tabriz Football League	1	20	16	3	1	34	26	51	1/8 finals	
1988–89	Tabriz Football League	1	20	14	1	5	28	28	43	1/16 finals	
1989–90	Qods League	6	20	7	7	6	19	18	21	1/16 finals	
1990–91	2nd Division	4	14	7	4	3	20	10	18	Third Round	
1991–92	2nd Division	8	24	4	7	13	22	23	19	not held	
1992–93	2nd Division	7	26	9	11	6	27	20	29	not held	
1993–94	2nd Division	2	26	12	11	3	40	20	35	1/32 finals	Promoted
1994–95	Azadegan League	3	22	9	7	6	27	26	25	1/16 finals	
1995–96	Azadegan League	8	30	11	8	11	35	38	41	1/8 finals	
1996–97	Azadegan League	13	30	10	5	15	30	52	35	1/16 finals	Relegated
1997–98	2nd Division	5	18	7	6	5	19	12	27	not held	
1998–99	2nd Division	7	16	5	4	7	19	17	19	1/32 finals	
1999–00	2nd Division	9	34	8	12	14	35	55	36	Second Round	
2000–01	2nd Division	5	34	12	10	12	45	50	46	1/16finals	
2001–02	Azadegan League	3	20	9	5	6	28	19	32	1/16 finals	
2002–03	Azadegan League	9	30	9	11	10	40	39	38	Second Round	
2003–04	Azadegan League	7	30	11	8	11	34	32	41	Third Round	
2004–05	Azadegan League	9	22	6	8	8	18	21	24	Third Round	Group B
2005–06	Azadegan League	9	22	6	7	9	21	36	25	First Round	Group B
2006–07	Azadegan League	8	22	5	11	6	12	15	25	Second Round	Group A
2007–08	Azadegan League	11	22	3	12	7	15	25	21	Second Round	Group B
2008–09	Azadegan League	13	26	5	5	16	21	49	20	Second Round	Relegated
2009–10	2nd Division	4	16	4	8	4	22	19	20	First Round	Replaced
2010–11	Azadegan League	12	26	7	10	9	30	36	31	1/16 Final	
2011–12	Azadegan League	3	26	11	8	7	32	25	41	1/8 Final	
2012–13	Azadegan League	14	26	3	4	19	18	47	13	First Round	Relegated
2013–14	2nd Division	11	24	6	5	13	26	33	23	Round of 32	
2014–15	2nd Division	7	18	5	9	4	20	19	24	Third Round	Replaced
2015–16	Azadegan League	2	38	16	15	7	53	36	63	Did not enter	Promoted
2016–17	Persian Gulf Pro League	16	30	3	7	20	18	45	16	Round of 16	Relegated
2017–18	Azadegan League	15	8	13	13	27	32	37	34	Second Round	Replaced
2018–19	Persian Gulf Pro League	13	30	4	17	9	19	26	29	Quarter-Final	
2019–20	Persian Gulf Pro League	11	30	8	7	15	28	40	31	Round of 32	
2020–21	Persian Gulf Pro League	16	30	2	8	20	19	52	14	Round of 32	Relegated

== Club stadium ==
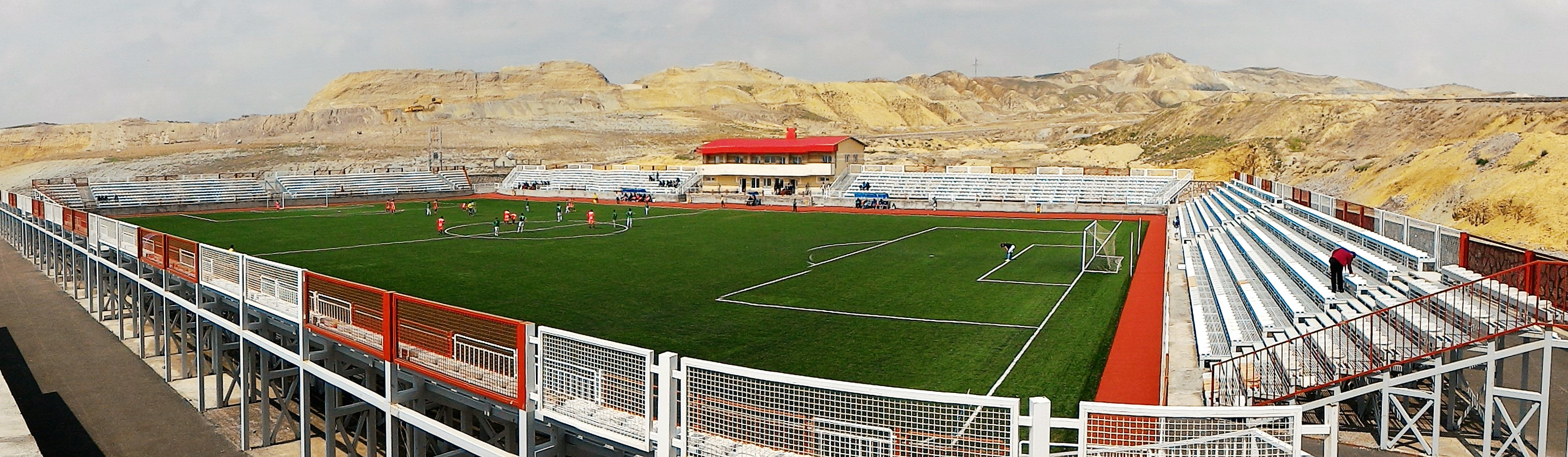
Marzdaran Stadium for Club Academy and training ground

Before the construction of Sahand Stadium, Machine Sazi played all of its matches at Bagh Shomal Stadium, which currently has a capacity of 25,000. They occasionally play big games at Sahand Stadium. Football academy and training ground of Machine sazi is Marzdaran Stadium.

== Club colors ==
White	Green

=== Kit evolution ===
1969–71
1971–73
1973–74
1974–75
1975–76
1976–77

1977–82
1982–84
1984–88
1988–03
2003–05
2005–

== Club managers ==
=== Managerial history ===
Name	Period
(Iran) Mohammad Ranjbar	1972–73
(Iran) Ali Hashemi	1973–77
(Iran) Garnik Mehrabian	1978–80
(Iran) Hossein Fekri	1980–83
(Iran) Ali Shirdel	1983–88
(Iran) Yaghob Zeynali	1988–89
(Iran) Hesam Golzar	1989–90
(Iran) Biyok Sabaghi	1990–91
(Soviet Union) Asif Namazov	1991–92
(Iran) Rahim Mehnamaye Aghdam	1994–95
(Iran) Nasser Hejazi	1995–96
(Romania) Adrian Szabo	1996–97
(Iran) Hamid Nadimian	
(Iran) Majid Jahanpour	2001–02
(Iran) Asghar Etebari	2002–03
(Iran) Nasser Hejazi	2003
(Azerbaijan) Vagif Sadygov	2003
(Azerbaijan) Boyukagha Hajiyev	2003–04
(Iran) Gholamhossein Karimpour	2004–05
(Iran) Ahad Sheykhlari	2005–06
(Iran) Gholamreza Baghabadi	July 2006 – July 7
(Iran) Ali Nikbakht	July 2007 – Feb 08
(Iran) Gholamreza Baghabadi	Feb 2008 – June 8
(Iran) Asghar Etebari	July 2008 – Jan 09
(Iran) Sirous Bayrami	Jan 2009 – April 9
(Iran) Seyed Javad Mousavi	April 2009 – Oct 10
(Iran) Ahad Sheykhlari	Oct 2010 – Sept 10
(Iran) Ayyoub Zolfaghari	Sept 2010 – Dec 10
(North Macedonia) Zoran Smilevski	Dec 2010 – June 11
(Iran) Rasoul Khatibi	June 2011 – July 12
(Iran) Nasser Ebrahimi	Aug 2012 – Sept 12
(Iran) Alireza Akbarpour	Sept 2012 – Nov 12
(Iran) Asghar Etebari	Nov 2012 – Jan 13
(Iran) Hossein Khatibi	Jan 2013 – March 13
(Iran) Vali Hatami	March 2013 – Aug 13
(Iran) Amir Dadash Ziaee	Aug 2013 – Sept 13
(Iran) Seyed Javad Mousavi	Sept 2013
(Iran) Saeed Parkhideh	Sept 2013 – Oct 13
(Iran) Seyed Reza Sadat	Oct 2013 – Jan 14
(Iran) Omid Tayeri	Jan 2014 – Feb 14
(Iran) Amin Haml Abadi	Feb 2014 – March 14
(Iran) Younes Bahonar	March 2014 – April 14
(Iran) Amir Dadashziaei	April 2014 – Sept 14
(Iran) Gholamreza Baghabadi	Sept 2014 – June 15
(Iran) Nader Dastneshan	June 2015 – Nov 15
(Iran) Rasoul Khatibi	Nov 2015– Dec 16
(Iran) Farhad Kazemi	Dec 2016– Jul 17
(Iran) Rasoul Khatibi	Jul 2017– Dec 17
(Iran) Firouz Karimi	Jul 2018– Aug 18
(Iran) Mohammad Reza Mohajeri	Aug 2018– Jan 19
(Iran) Rasoul Khatibi	Jan 2019- Jun 19
(Iran) Ahad Sheykhlari	Jun 2019- Feb 20
(Iran) Human Afazeli	Feb 2020- Aug 20
(Iran) Vahid Bayatloo	Aug 2020-May 2021
(Iran) Alireza Akbarpour	May 2021-

mohanmad saeid akhbari 2020

=== Current coaching staff ===
Position	Name	Nation
Head coach	Alireza Akbarpour	(Iran)
Assistant managers	Gholamreza Baghabadi; Naser farshbaf Adel Baba Pour	(Iran)
Goalkeeping coach	Davood faal	(Iran)
Fitness coach	Hamidreza joudaki	
Analyzer	Bakhtiar Hosseinzadeh	(Iran)
Team manager	Mohammad Pirozram	(Iran)

== Honours ==
- Azadegan League
  - Runners-up (1): 2015–16
