= Zabihollah Kohkan =

Iranian footballer

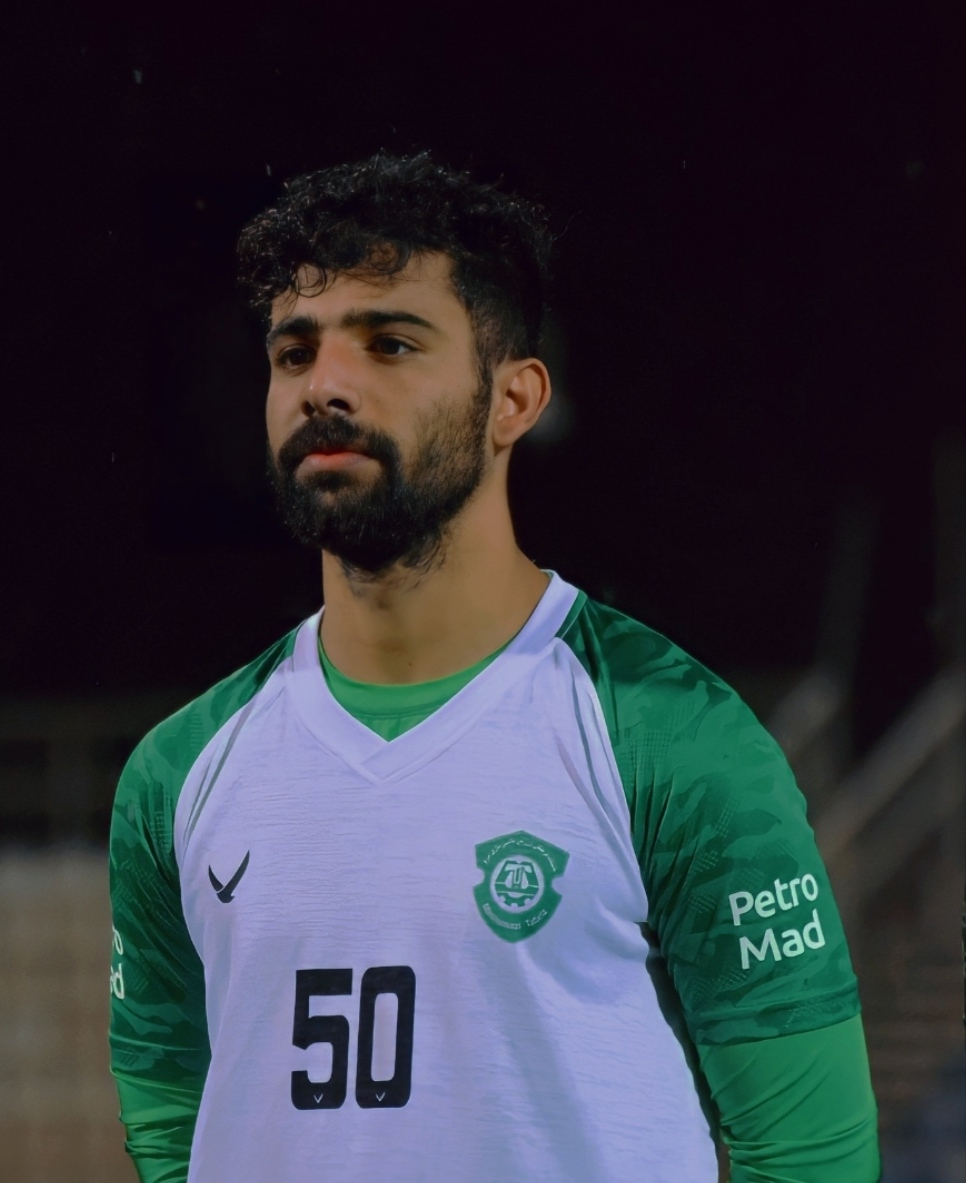

Personal information
- Date of birth: 30 November 2000 (age 25)
- Place of birth: Zehak, Iran
- Height: 1.78 m (5 ft 10 in)
- Position: Midfielder

Youth career
- –2016: Paykan
- 2016–2017: Saipa
- 2017–2020: Moghavemat Tehran

Senior career*
Years	Team	Apps	(Gls)
2020–2022	Machine Sazi	14	(0)
- * Club domestic league appearances and goals

Zabihollah Kohkan (Persian: ذبیح‌الله کوهکن; born 30 November 2000) is an Iranian former professional footballer who played as an attacking midfielder.
