= Ahad Sheykhlari =

Iranian footballer and manager

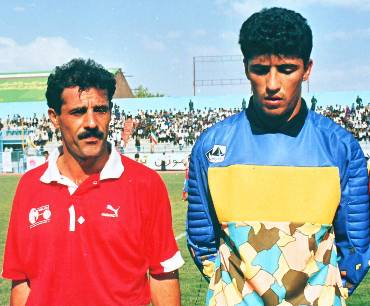
- Ahad Sheikh Lari and Ali Reza Nik Mehr

Personal information
- Full name: Ahad Sheykhlari
- Date of birth: 18 April 1960 (age 66)
- Place of birth: Tabriz, Iran
- Height: 1.74 m (5 ft 9 in)
- Positions: Striker; sweeper

Youth career
- 1976–1978: Machine Sazi
- 1978–1980: Tractor Sazi

Senior career*
Years	Team	Apps	(Gls)
1980–1997	Tractor Sazi		

International career
1979–1981	Iran U-20		
1984–1992	Iran	1	(0)

Managerial career
- 2002–2003: Tractor
- 2002–2003: Tractor
- 2003–2005: Shahid Ghandi
- 2005–2006: Machine Sazi
- 2006: Shahrdari Tabriz
- 2007–2008: Tractor
- 2010–2013: Mes Soongoun
- 2016: Shahrdari Ardabil
- 2020: Machine Sazi
- * Club domestic league appearances and goals

Ahad Sheykhlari (Persian: احد شیخ‌لاری, born 18 April 1960 in Tabriz, Iran) is an Iranian professional football player who was forced to leave the green field unexpectedly due to the pressure from his teammates and club's official, who believed his success foreshadowed his teammates' popularity. He is currently a professional football manager. He started his football career as an amateur in Tabriz dirt fields and neighborhood clubs. The very first football club he joined was Charandab's neighborhood club Peykan. He played his professional career for Machine Sazi, Montakhabeh Tabriz, Idem F.C., Tractor, and Esteghlal Rasht F.C. During his playing career for Tractor as a striker, he scored 115 goals. Towards the end of his playing career, Vasile Godja, the manager of Tractor, used him as a defender and he performed as a successful sweeper. He also represented Iran at the national level, playing for Iran's under-20 football team and the Iran national football team and has 20 national caps with five goals. Tractor's fans named him Tabriz's Maradona due to his aggressive technique, speed, scoring, and he kicks specific skills.

After being forced to leave his playing career unexpectedly, he became a football manager, and although he had been a player-manager during his playing career in Idem F.C., he started his first sole managerial career in Shahrdari Shot F.C. in 1996–1997, he became U20 Shahrdari Tabriz F.C.’s manager and lead the team to Iran's U20 champions league and earned the 1st place and the cup. Later, he became Tractor’s manager at difficult times when a few matches had already passed half-season and the team suffered terribly from continuous losses, dead draws, and no goals. For a brief period of about six months in 2002, he revived Tractor from what was known to Tractor‘s fans darkest days. Still, all the heroic efforts of Sheykhlari and the players went in vain due to the lost intuition the club had suffered under Mahmoud Yavari’s management. Many fans today still believe that if he was the manager of Tractor before the season started, Tractor never would have fallen to 2nd Division and might have even been one of the three top clubs. He later became manager of Shahid Ghandi and led the club to promotion to the Iran Pro League for the first time. He later managed other Tabriz-based clubs like Shahrdari Tabriz and Machine Sazi, which was on the verge of demotion to the 2nd Division and managed to save the club by 9 matches and an average of 2.3 points per game. In July 2007, he returned to Tractor as a manager but due to the heavy fringe made by a band of disobedient players who managed to provoke hooligans against the club, the team failed to be promoted to the first Division. However, he left the club at the first rank on the table. He was also the manager of Mes Soongoun for four years, which he took from the 3rd Division to the Azadegan League. He became the first Iranian manager to promote a team from the 3rd Division to the 1st in succession every year.

== Honours ==
=== As a player ===
Tractor

- Hazfi Cup Runner-up (1): 1993–94
- 2nd Division Runner-up (1): 1995–96

=== As a manager ===
Shahid Ghandi

- Azadegan League (1): 2004–05

Mes Soongoun

- 3rd Division (1): 2011–12
- 2nd Division (1): 2012–13
