= Mohammad Reza Zonuzi =

Iranian businessman and sports director

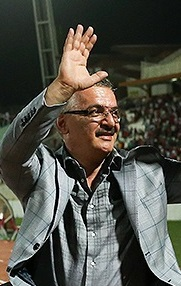
- Born: c. 1967
- Occupation: Businessmen
- Website: daricgroup.com

Mohammad Reza Zonuzi (Persian: محمدرضا زُنوزی مطلق) is an Iranian businessman and sports director.

He also owns the ATA Airlines, Tractor S.C., Tabriz Iran khodro and industrial factories such as Investment Company Tabriz steel expansion, Dorpad Tabriz industrial group factories, Yaghout Tabriz industry group factories, Tavangaran Sahand Industrial Group, Tabriz Bonyan Diesel plant, Almas Industrial Group Tabriz, and Investment Training Center Gostar Steel Kosar.
