= Marzdaran Stadium =

Football stadium in Tabriz, Iran

Coordinates: 38.0472°N 46.3983°E

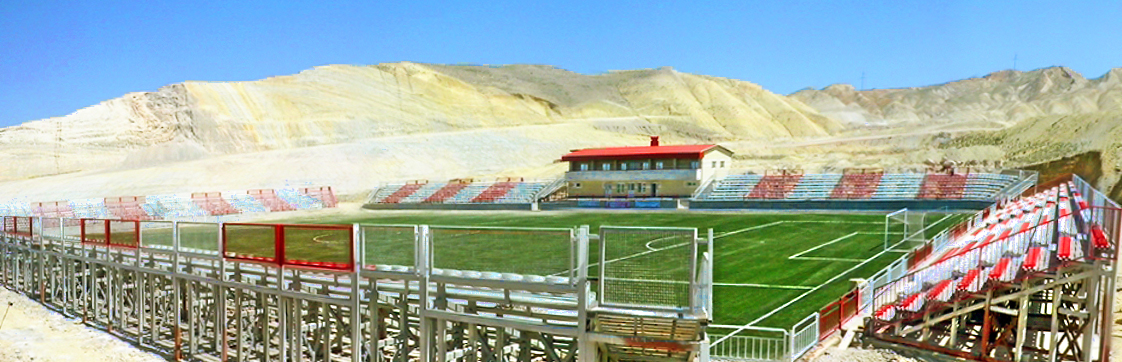
- Interactive map of Marzdaran Stadium
- Full name: Marzdaran Stadium
- Location: Tabriz, Iran
- Owner: Municipality of Tabriz
- Capacity: 5,000
- Surface: Artificial Grass

Construction
- Built: 2014
- Opened: May 2014

Tenants
- Machine Sazi (Training ground and club's academy); Shahrdari Tabriz (Matches of club in second division league)

Marzdaran Stadium of Tabriz (Persian: ورزشگاه مرزداران تبریز) is a stadium in Tabriz, Iran. It was previously used primarily for football matches and served as the home stadium of Shahrdari Tabriz. Currently it is used as a football academy and training ground for Machine Sazi. The stadium holds 5,000 people and was built in 2014 by the Municipality of Tabriz.

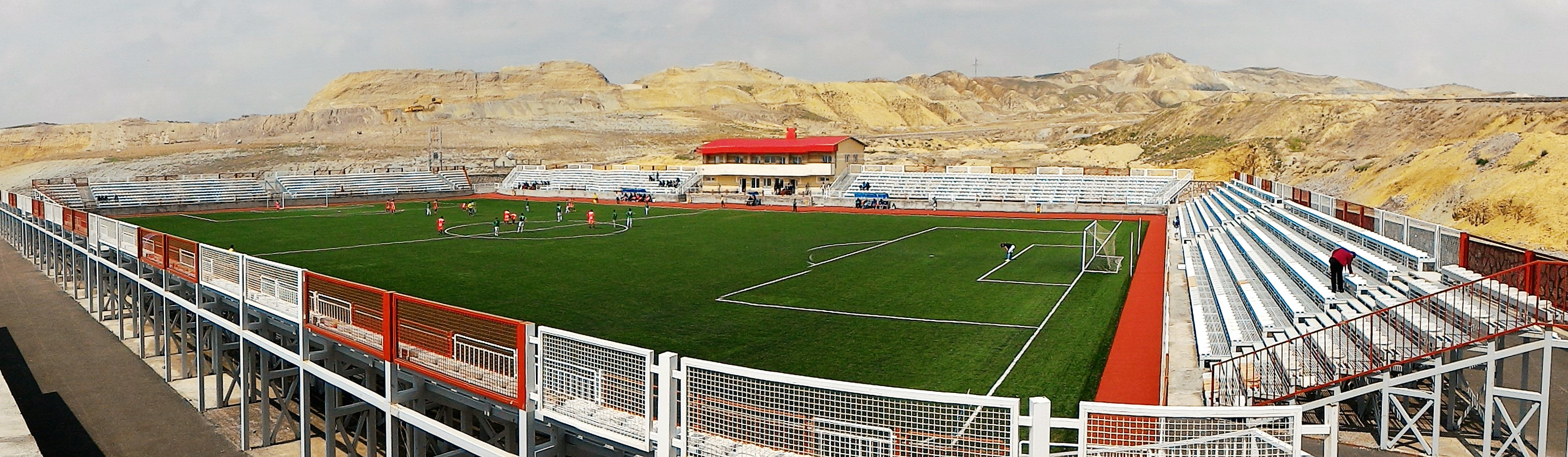

== See also ==
- Sahand Stadium
- Takhti Stadium (Tabriz)
