= 2014 Shohada Cup =

Tournament details
- Host country: Iran
- Dates: 21 July – 24 July
- Teams: 4 (from 1 confederation)
- Venue: 1 (in 1 host cities)

Final positions
- Champions: Tractor (1st title)
- Runners-up: Esteghlal
- Third place: Paykan
- Fourth place: Malavan

Tournament statistics
- Matches played: 4
- Goals scored: 8 (2 per match)
- Top scorer(s): Arash Borhani; Farshad Ahmadzadeh (2 goals)

The 2014 Shohada Cup was a friendly football tournament that took place in Tehran in the Iran in July 2014.

== Participating teams ==
Totally 4 teams get permission to participate in the tournament "2014 Shohada Cup".

- Esteghlal from ( Iran)
- Malavan from ( Iran)
- Paykan from ( Iran)
- Tractor from ( Iran)

== Matches ==
=== First round ===
21 July 2014
22:15 IRDT (UTC+04:30)

Esteghlal	2 – 1	Malavan
Borhani 68' (pen.), 77'	report	Rafkhaei 18'

Takhti Stadium, Tehran, Iran
Attendance: 2,000
Referee: Mehdi Seyed-Ali

22 July 2014
22:15 IRDT (UTC+04:30)

Paykan	1 – 1	Tractor
Daghighi 85' (pen.)	report	Ahmadzadeh 43'
Penalties
Nosrati (penalty missed); Samuel (penalty missed); Nouri (penalty scored); Rahmati (penalty scored); Daghighi (penalty missed)	2 – 3	(penalty scored) Gordani; (penalty scored) Aghaei; (penalty missed) Kiani; (penalty scored) Iranpourian

Takhti Stadium, Tehran, Iran
Attendance: 100
Referee: Vahid Salehi

=== Play-off ===
23 July 2014
22:15 IRDT (UTC+04:30)

Paykan	0 – 0	Malavan
	report
Penalties
Nouri (penalty scored); Ghasemi (penalty scored); Amiri (penalty scored); Mohammad (penalty scored)	4 – 1	(penalty scored) Ramezani; (penalty missed) Oladi; (penalty missed) Delavari

Takhti Stadium, Tehran, Iran
Attendance: 100
Referee: Kopal Nazemi

=== Final ===
24 July 2014
22:15 IRDT (UTC+04:30)

Esteghlal	1 – 2	Tractor
Ghazi 15'	report	Ahmadzadeh 45'; Delir 55'

Takhti Stadium, Tehran, Iran
Attendance: 20,000
Referee: Iman Ariyamansh

== Statistics ==
=== Top scorers ===
Position	Player	Club	Goals
1	(Iran) Arash Borhani	(Iran) Esteghlal	2
1	(Iran) Farshad Ahmadzadeh	(Iran) Tractor	2
2	(Iran) Jalal Rafkhaei	(Iran) Malavan	1
2	(Iran) Saeid Daghighi	(Iran) Paykan	1
2	(Iran) Mohammad Ghazi	(Iran) Esteghlal	1
2	(Iran) Mohsen Delir	(Iran) Tractor	1
_	OG		0
_	Penalty Goals		2
_	technical loses of 3–0		0
Total goals (Including technical loses)			8
Total games			4
Average per game			2

== See also ==
- 2014–15 Iran Pro League
- 2014–15 Hazfi Cup
