= 1996–97 Iran 2nd Division =

Iran Football's 2nd Division
- Season: 1996–97
- Champions: Fajr Sepasi
- Promoted: Fajr Sepasi; Saipa; Foolad; Shahrdari Tabriz

In the 1996–97 Iran 2nd Division football season, the top four teams at the end of the second round (Fajr Sepasi, Saipa, Foolad and Shahrdari Tabriz) gained promotion to the Azadegan League, which was at the time the top-level football league in Iran.
