= Amirhossein Amiri =

Iranian footballer (born 1994)

Personal information
- Full name: Seyed Amirhossein Amiri
- Date of birth: 3 March 1994 (age 32)
- Place of birth: Tehran, Iran
- Height: 1.83 m (6 ft 0 in)
- Position: Midfielder

Team information
- Current team: Fard Alborz
- Number: 6

Youth career
- –2013: Moghavemat
- 2013–2014: Persepolis

Senior career*
Years	Team	Apps	(Gls)
2014–2017	Paykan	32	(1)
2017	Machine Sazi	4	(0)
2019	Naft Masjed Soleyman	4	(0)
2021	PAS Hamedan		
2022–2023	Shahrdari Hamedan	15	(0)
2023–2024	Kavir Moghava		
2024–	Fard Alborz		
- * Club domestic league appearances and goals as of 23 May 2023

Seyed Amirhossein Amiri (Persian: سید امیرحسین امیری); born 3 March 1994) is an Iranian football midfielder who plays for Fard Alborz in the League 2.

== Club career ==
=== Early years ===
He joined Moghavemat Tehran U21 in 2012 and spent two season with them. He helped Moghavemat in winning the 2013–14 Tehran Asia Vision U21 Premier League.

=== Paykan ===
Nemati joined Paykan in summer 2014. he made his debut for Paykan on September 26, 2014, against Padideh as a substitute for Muamer Svraka.

== Club career statistics ==
As of 30 October 2014.

Club	Division	Season	League		Hazfi Cup		Asia		Total	
Club	Division	Season	Apps	Goals	Apps	Goals	Apps	Goals	Apps	Goals
Paykan	Pro League	2014–15	5	0	2	0	–	–	7	0
Paykan	Division 1	2015–16	11	0	1	0	–	–	12	0
Career Totals			16	0	3	0	0	0	19	0
