= 1975–76 Iran 2nd Division =

Iran Football's 2nd Division
- Season: 1975–76
- Champions: Machine Sazi

The following were the standings at the conclusion of Iran Football's 1975–76 2nd division season. Machine Sazi won the league.

== League standings ==
=== North Group ===
Pos	Team	Pld	W	D	L	GF	GA	GD	Pts	Qualification
1	Machine sazi	6	5	1	0	10	4	+6	11	Final League
2	Iran Sari	6	3	2	1	6	5	+1	8	
3	Sepidrood Rasht	6	3	2	1	6	5	+1	8	
4	Santi Behshahr	6	0	1	5	4	11	−7	1	

=== South Group ===
Pos	Team	Pld	W	D	L	GF	GA	GD	Pts	Qualification
1	Arsham Kerman	4	3	1	0	7	4	+3	7	Final League
2	Shahrdari Shiraz	4	1	2	1	6	5	+1	4	
3	Gomrok Ahvaz	4	0	1	3	4	7	−3	1	

== Final League standing ==
Machine sazi	2–1	Arsham Kerman

Tabriz

Arsham Kerman	0–0	Machine sazi

Kerman

Machine sazi promoted to 1976–77 Takht Jamshid Cup.

== See also ==
- 1975–76 Takht Jamshid Cup
