= Majid Jalali =

Iranian footballer (born 1956)

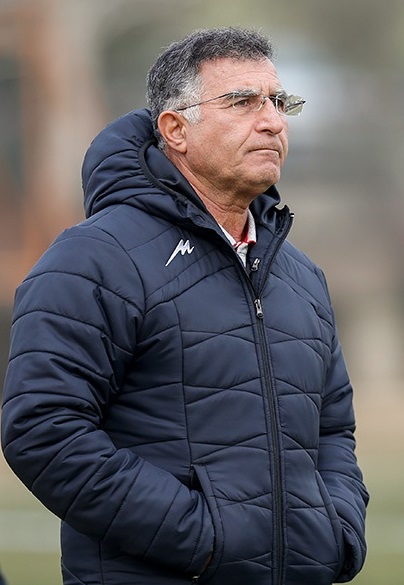
- Jalali with Nassaji in 2019

Personal information
- Date of birth: 6 September 1956 (age 70)
- Place of birth: Tehran, Iran
- Position: Midfielder

Senior career*
Years	Team	Apps	(Gls)
1973–1977	Alborz		
1977–1983	Vahdat Tehran		
1983–1984	Shahin Tehran		
1984–1986	Vahdat Tehran		

Managerial career
- 1986–1993: Vahdat Tehran
- 1993–1996: Homa Tehran
- 1996–1998: Payam Khorasan
- 1990–1992: Iran U17
- 1993–1994: Iran U20
- 1994–1997: Iran Army
- 2002–2003: Iran U20
- 2003–2004: Pas Tehran
- 2005: Saba Battery Tehran
- 2006: Shahid Ghandi Yazd
- 2006: Pas Tehran
- 2007: Esteghlal Ahvaz
- 2007–2012: Foolad Khouzestan
- 2013–2014: Tractorsazi Tabriz
- 2014–2016: Saipa Tehran
- 2016–2018: Paykan Tehran
- 2019: Nassaji Mazandaran
- 2019–2020: Gol Gohar Sirjan
- 2021: Nassaji Mazandaran
- * Club domestic league appearances and goals

Majid Jalali (Persian: مجید جلالی, born 6 September 1956) is an Iranian football manager and a former player. He has served as the manager in several clubs in Iran like Pas Tehran, Saba Battery, Foolad, and also national football teams at various youth levels. He is also currently the secretary general of the Iran Football Coaches Association.

== Club career ==
Jalali was born on 6 September 1956 in Tehran, Iran. His parents are originally from Yazd province, Pandar. He started his club career with Alborz Tehran at the age of 17. Later, he played for other Tehran clubs like Vahdat Tehran and Shahin.

== International career ==
In 1982, Jalali was invited to Iran national team but never played for it.

== Coaching career ==
Jalali started his coaching career aged 21 by coaching Vahdat's youth team while he was playing for the senior team. He officially coached Vahdat's senior team as of 1986. Jalali is most notable for his role as coach for Pas Tehran and Saba Battery and in recent years when he won the league and Hazfi Cup with these teams, but he had few unsuccessful terms in Shahid Ghandi and Esteghlal Ahvaz. He has also served as coach of Iran's under-16, and under-20 teams, as well as, Iran's armed forces football team. He was the manager of Foolad in 2008–09 season but left the club because the chairman despite his good results was negotiating with other coaches for the season after. He returned to the club few weeks after the season where the club failed to win any matches and finished 10th in the league. He announced that he will not be renewed his contract at the end of 2011–12 season. After spending one season out, he signed a one-year contract with Tractor on 27 May 2013. He also had bids from Rah Ahan Sorinet and Championship side Brighton & Hove Albion. He was sacked by the club on 19 January 2014. On 13 May 2014, he was named as head coach of Saipa with signing a three-year contract. Jalali in 2019 year connected head coach of Nassaji Mazandaran.

== Coaching statistics ==
As of 30 November 2018

Team	From	To	Record							
Team	From	To	G	W	D	L	Win %	GF	GA	+/-
Pas Tehran	June 2003	June 2004	26	15	8	3	57.69	48	29	+19
Saba Battery	January 2005	December 2005	30	13	11	6	43.33	35	31	+4
Foolad	July 2007	June 2012	175	77	55	43	44.00	201	163	+38
Tractor	June 2013	January 2014	24	10	11	3	41.67	35	23	+12
Saipa	May 2014	May 2016	61	24	15	22	39.34	76	65	+13
Paykan	May 2016	December 2018	71	26	20	25	36.62	83	77	+5

== Honours ==
=== Manager ===
Vahdat

- Tehran Football League (U-16 sides): 1982, 1985 (runner-up)

Iran (Armed Forces)

- World Military Cup: 1995 (runner-up)

Pas Tehran

- Iran Pro League: 2003–04

Saba Battery Tehran

- Hazfi Cup: 2004–05
- Iranian Super Cup: 2005

=== Individual ===
- Iranian Manager of the Year: 2004
- Navad Manager of the Month (1): October 2017

Awards and achievements
Preceded by Farhad Kazemi	Iran Pro League Winning Manager; 2003–04	Succeeded by Mladen Frančić
