= Shahrdari Tabriz F.C. =

Iranian football club

Shahrdari Tabriz شهرداری تبريز
- Full name: Shahrdari Tabriz Football Club
- Nickname: Tabriz City
- Founded: 1979; 40 years ago (as Tabriz Firefighters Sports Club)
- Dissolved: 2020
- Ground: Marzdaran Stadium, Tabriz
- Capacity: 5,000
- Head Coach: Heidar Ja'fari
- League: Azadegan League
- 2018–19: Azadegan League, 14th
Home colours	Away colours	Third colours

Shahrdari Tabriz Cultural and Athletic Club (Persian: باشگاه فرهنگی ورزشی شهرداري تبريز, Bashgah-e Futbal-e Vârzeshi-ye Shiherdari Tebriz) was an Iranian sports club most widely known for its professional football team based in Tabriz, Iran.

Shahrdari Tabriz also has futsal, basketball, road cycling, and volleyball teams.

They were promoted to the Iran Pro League after their performance in the 2012–13 season, but their promotion was revoked due to their involvement in a match-fixing scandal, and they were relegated one division to League 2. Shahrdari stopped all their professional teams in order not to accept the FFIRI's penalty. The team's license was moved to Pashazadeh Company.

== Club history ==
=== The birth of the club ===
In 1979 Tabriz Firefighters Sports Club was formed in the city of Tabriz and started competing in the 2nd Division of the local leagues of Tabriz. They were eventually promoted to the top flight in Tabriz, and in 1985 they were renamed to Shahrdari Tabriz Sports and Cultural Club.

=== Golden Age ===
In 1993 Shahrdari defeated Tractor to become champions of the East Azerbaijan Province League and earned a spot in the national 2nd Division. A year later they were promoted to the Azadegan League, then the first tier of Iranian football. In their first year Shahrdari finished fourth in their group. In the 1995–96 season however, Shahrdari were relegated back to the 2nd Division. The next season they became champions of the 2nd Division and once again were promoted to the Azadegan League.

=== Promotion and relegation ===
Shahrdari Tabriz won promotion to the Persian Gulf Pro League on June 11, 2010, ending an 11-year absence from the top division and finishing as champions in the Azadegan League.

Shahrdari was relegated at the end of the 2011–12 season. They won promotion back to the Persian Gulf Cup the following year but were relegated to the 2nd Division because of a match-fixing scandal.

Shahrdari finished 2nd in the 2013–14 season and were promoted to the Azadegan League for the 2014–15 season. In the 2014–15 season, Shahrdari only escaped relegation after defeating Esteghlal Ahvaz in the relegation play-off. Before the 2015–16 season, due to financial problems, Shahrdari dropped out of the Azadegan League and were placed in the 2nd Division.

In 2017, Shahrdari returned to the Azadegan League after finishing first in Group A.

== Season-by-season ==
The table below chronicles the achievements of Shahrdari Tabriz in various competitions since 1990.

Season	League	Position	Hazfi Cup
1990–91	East Azerbaijan league	1st	did not qualify
1991–92	Third Division	16th	did not qualify
1992–93	East Azerbaijan league	4th	did not qualify
1993–94	East Azerbaijan league	1st	did not qualify
1994–95	2nd Division	3rd	did not qualify
1995–96	Azadegan League	15th	First Round
1996–97	2nd Division	2nd	First Round
1997–98	Azadegan League	5th	Not held
1998–99	Azadegan League	14th	Second Round
1999-00	2nd Division	10th	did not qualify
2000–01	Third Division	14th	did not qualify
2001–02	East Azerbaijan league	1st	did not qualify
2002–03	2nd Division	4th	did not qualify
2003–04	2nd Division	7th
2004–05	2nd Division	4th
2005–06	2nd Division	2nd
2006–07	Azadegan League	7th
2007–08	Azadegan League	6th	Second Round
2008–09	Azadegan League	2nd	Second Round
2009–10	Azadegan League	1st	Third Round
2010–11	Persian Gulf Cup	12th	1/16 Final
2011–12	Persian Gulf Cup	16th	1/16 Final
2012–13	Azadegan League	1st	1/16 Final
2013–14	2nd Division	2nd	Third Round
2014–15	Azadegan League	9th/Group B	Fourth Round
2015–16	2nd Division	7th/Group B	First Round

Promoted	Relegated

== Club managers ==
- (Romania) Adrian Szabo (1995–1996)
- (Iran) Bijan Zolfagharnasab (1997–1998)
- (Iran) Mohammad Hossein Ziaei (September 2008 – July 2009)
- (Iran) Akbar Misaghian (July 2009 – October 2010)
- (Iran) Hamid Derakhshan (October 2010 – June 2011)
- (Serbia) Miodrag Ješić (June 2011 – December 2011)
- (Iran) Ali Asghar Modir Roosta (December 2011 – May 2012)
- (Iran) Bijan Azizi (interim) (May 2012)
- (Iran) Faraz Kamalvand (May 2012 – April 2013)
- (Iran) Mehdi Pashazadeh (August 2013 – January 2015)
- (Iran) Khodadad Azizi (January 2015 – July 2015)
- (Iran) Gholamreza Baghabadi (July 2015 – May 2016)
- (Iran) Ali Saleh-Panahi (June 2016 – October 2017)
- (Iran) Sirous Dinmohammadi (October 2017 – Present)

== Honours ==
- Azadegan League
  - Winner (1): 2009–10
- 2nd Division
  - Winner (1): 2016–17
  - Runner-up (3): 1996–97, 2005–06, 2013–14
- 3rd Division
  - Winner (1): 2003–04
- East Azerbaijan League

- Winners (3): 1990–91, 1993–94, 2002–03

== See also ==
- Shahrdari Tabriz Futsal Club
- Shahrdari Tabriz Volleyball Club
- Tabriz Shahrdary Team
