= Saba Qom F.C. =

Iranian football club

Saba Qom صبای قم
- Full name: Saba Qom Football Club
- Nickname(s): Saba
- Founded: 1974; 51 years ago, (as Mohemmat Sazi Artesh)
- Dissolved: 22 October 2018
- Ground: Yadegar Emam Stadium, Qom
- Capacity: 10,610
- Head Coach: mohammad hosein mozafari
Home colours	Away colours

Saba Qom Football Club (Persian: باشگاه فوتبال صبای قم, Bashgah-e Futbal-e Sâbay-e Qom) was an Iranian football team based in Qom, Iran. The club was dissolved in 2018. The team is a former part of Saba Battery Club, owned by Saba Battery Co., and was moved to Qom in 2007, although they were formerly registered as a team from Tehran playing at Shahid Derakhshan Stadium of Robat Karim.

Saba won the 2005 edition of the Hazfi Cup and the 2005 edition of the Iranian Super Cup.

== History ==
Mohemmat sazi Football Club (Persian: باشگاه فوتبال مهمات سازی) was an Iranian football club based in Tehran, Iran. They play in the 2nd Division.

=== Establishment ===
In 1974 a football called Mohemat Sazi was established in Tehran. The team never had any major success and only played in the lower leagues of the Iranian football league system. In the early 1990s the club was sponsored by a company named Maham. During the later stages of the club's history they were sponsored by Sanam, an electronics company.

=== Takeover ===
In 2002 the club's shares were sold to Saba Battery Company (also known as Niru Company) which is under the control of Iran's Ministry of Defense. Due to the club's greatly improved financial status the team was able to purchase talented players and were promoted to the Iran Pro League in 2004.

=== Domestic Titles ===
==== 2004–2005 ====
In the first year of participation in Iran Pro League, Saba Battery managed to participate in the AFC Champions League for the first time ever, After becoming champions of the Hazfi Cup under Milan Živadinović. In the 2005 season Saba Battery also won the Iranian Super Cup, defeating Foolad the Iran Pro League champion 4–0. And until 2016 they remained the only team to have the title.

==== 2006–2007 ====
Although Saba Battery did not have a successful year in Iran Pro League, they were competitive in the Hazfi Cup. Saba Battery became Runners-up after losing to Sepahan 4–2 in aggregate, with Mohammad Hossein Ziaei. Since Sepahan became 5th in the Iran Pro League, that meant that Saba Battery won't be going to AFC Champions League.

=== Iran Pro League ===
The team debuted in the Iran Pro League in the 2004–05 season and was able to secure a berth for the Asian Champions League after winning the 2005 Hazfi Cup, however failing to make it out of their group. In the same year Saba won the Iranian Super Cup defeating league champions Foolad 4–0. In 2007 Saba once again made the final of the Hazfi Cup, this time losing 4–0 to Sepahan on aggregate.

==== Move to Qom ====
In 2008 Saba relocated to Qom because the city of Tehran had many football teams with low attendance figures. The team was renamed Saba Qom after the move. Saba was one of the few teams of the league in 2008–09 season which did not change managers during the season and finished in 6th position at the end of the season something that happened again in the next season. In the 2011–12 Persian Gulf Cup, Saba Qom finished 4th securing a play-off spot for the 2013 AFC Champions League. In the play-off Saba lost to Al Shabab on penalties and failed to qualify to the group stage.

==== Ali Daei Era ====
In July 2015 Saba announced that Ali Daei would lead the club for the 2015–16 Persian Gulf Pro League season. Saba started well and were within contention of an AFC Champions League in the first half of the season, but in the second half they faltered and eventually finished in seventh place.

== Season-by-season ==
For details on seasons, see List of Saba Qom F.C. seasons

The table below chronicles the achievements of Saba Qom in various competitions since 2002.

Season	League	Position	Hazfi Cup	AFC	Notes
2002–03	Azadegan League	6th	Did not enter	Did not enter
2003–04	Azadegan League	1st	Did not enter	Did not qualify	Promoted
2004–05	Iran Pro League	9th	Champion	Did not qualify
2005–06	Iran Pro League	4th	Semi-final	Group stage
2006–07	Iran Pro League	13th	Runner-up	Did not qualify
2007–08	Iran Pro League	3rd	Quarter-final	Did not qualify
2008–09	Iran Pro League	6th	Semi-final	Group stage
2009–10	Iran Pro League	6th	Quarter-final	Did not qualify
2010–11	Iran Pro League	10th	Round of 32	Did not qualify
2011–12	Iran Pro League	4th	Quarter-final	Did not qualify
2012–13	Iran Pro League	9th	Round of 16	Play-off
2013–14	Iran Pro League	9th	Round of 32	Did not qualify
2014–15	Iran Pro League	9th	Round of 32	Did not qualify
2015–16	Iran Pro League	7th	Round of 16	Did not qualify
2016–17	Iran Pro League	15th	Round of 16	Did not qualify

== See also ==
- Saba Battery Club
- Saba Qom futsal Club
- Saba Novin Qom Football Club
