= Pandar =

Pandar پندر
- Village
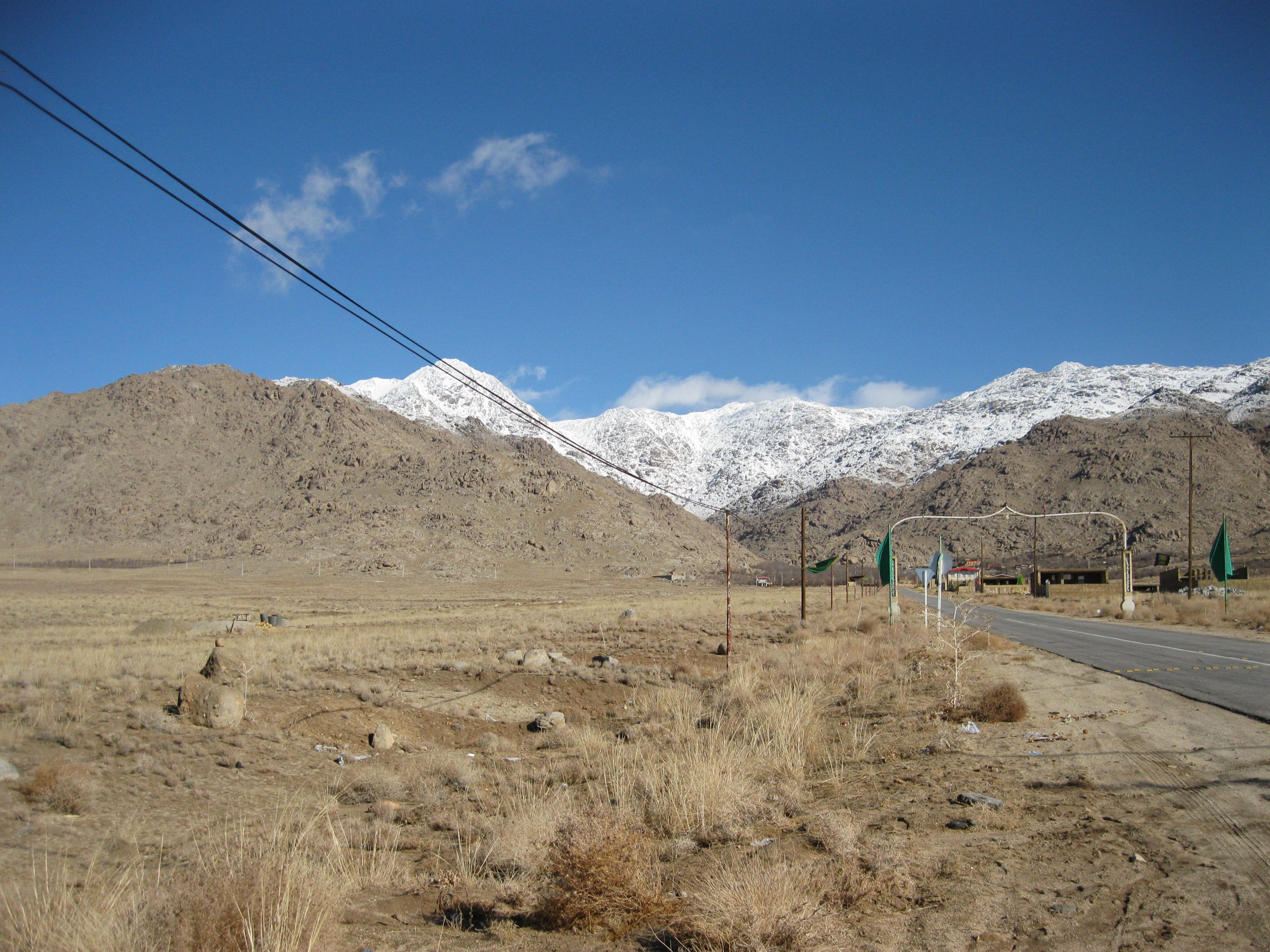
- Pandar village.

- Location within Iran
- Coordinates: 31°28′20″N 54°10′58″E
- Country: Iran
- Province: Yazd
- County: Taft
- Bakhsh: Nir
- Rural District: Zardeyn

Population (2006)
  - Total: 330
- Time zone: UTC+3:30 (IRST)
  - Summer (DST): UTC+4:30 (IRDT)

Pandar (Persian: پندر; also known as Panj Dar) is a village in Zardeyn Rural District, Nir District, Taft County, Yazd Province, Iran. As of the 2006 census, its population was 330 across 92 families. Pandar is on the eastern slopes of Shirkooh Mountain. Alongside historic cities and in vast places in Iran, there are unknown villages that are an unmatched memory for the lasting effects of cultural heritage. Pandar Village is one of these lasting villages, which is on the hillside and beside the Yazd desert for many years, which is beautiful and has attracted many tourists. Pandar is a beautiful, mountainous place with numerous historical sites. According to the view of the botanical experts, the village has a treasure trove of medicinal herbs. The village is located six kilometers east of Nir and located on the northern side of the area of Poshtokh. Pandar is located in the vicinity of many villages and fields. The village of Shir Kuh is located in the southeast of Pandar, about 1 km away, Mahmoodabad farm in the south of Pandar, 1.5 km away, as well as the village of Mahdiabad and Golgazar farm (Golgodar), southwest of Pendar. Pander ends on the north to the mountain, stretching along them to Menashed, Nir, Yazd, Tazerjan and Dehbala.

== Name origin ==
According to some villagers, the name of Pandar has been derived from five large valley that have surrounded the whole village.

== Religion ==
Shia Islam is the dominant religion in Pandar village. There are around five mosques in Pandar which mass mosque is the main one where people usually say their prayers.
