= Vasile Godja =

Romanian footballer and manager

Personal information
- Full name: Vasile Ioan Godja
- Date of birth: 19 October 1954
- Place of birth: Brașov, Romania
- Date of death: 1 August 2016 (aged 61)
- Place of death: Bucharest, Romania

Managerial career
- Years: Team
- 1986–1990: Tractorul Brașov (youth)
- 1990–1997: Tractor Sazi
- 1997–1998: Tractorul Brașov
- 2003: Tractor Sazi

Vasile Ioan Godja (19 October 1954 – 1 August 2016) was a Romanian football player and manager.

Godja was head coach of Tractor an Iranian football club during the early 1990s, while working for Iran Tractor Manufacturing Co. (ITMCO), one of the industries in Tabriz, Iran.

== Playing career ==
Between 1970 and 1986 Godja played for local clubs Metrom Brașov, Steagul Roșu Brașov (now known as FC Brașov) and Tractorul Brașov.

== Managerial career ==
After retiring as a player, Godja managed the youth team of his hometown Tractorul Brașov. He obtained his coaching license at A.N.E.F.S. Bucharest in 1988.

From 1990–96, Godja was in this period the coach of Iranian football side Tractor, under his lead the club promoted from the third league to the first league. In the 1992–93 season, he led the club to a third-place finish in the Azadegan League top flight.

During the 1995–96 season Tractor were playing in the second league, Godja managed to promote the team once again into the first league. Under his leadership, Tractor were runners-up of the Hazfi Cup in 1994, and won in 1995 the MILLS International cup in India.

He was appointed again in July 2003 and spent six months without success before being replaced in December.

=== Discovery of footballers in Iran ===
Godja discovered and trained various players such as Karim Bargheri, Sirous Dinmohammadi, Alireza Nikmer and Hossein Khatibi all went to represent the Iran national team early in their careers.

== Death ==
Godja died on 1 August 2016, at the age of 61, after struggling for several years with an incurable disease.
