= 1974–75 Iran 2nd Division =

Iran Football's 2nd Division
- Season: 1974–75
- Champions: Tractor

The following are the standings at the end of Iran Football's 1974–75 football season. Tractor emerged as the champions.

== Final ==
Tractor	3–1	Bargh Shiraz

Tabriz

Bargh Shiraz	3–1	Tractor

Shiraz

Bargh Shiraz	0–1	Tractor

Kerman

Tractor and Bargh Shiraz promoted to Takht Jamshid Cup 1975–76.

== See also ==
- 1974–75 Takht Jamshid Cup
