= Mohammad Hossein Ziaei =

Iranian footballer and manager

Personal information
- Full name: Mohammad Hossein Ziaei
- Place of birth: Tehran, Iran
- Position: Defender

Senior career*
Years	Team	Apps	(Gls)
1979–1980	Vahdat	10	(0)
1980–1982	Shahin	12	(1)
1982–1989	Tractor	25	(5)
1989–1991	Vasas	17	(0)
1991–1996	Tractor		

Managerial career
- 1997–1998: Tractor
- 2002–2003: Sena
- 2003–2004: Paykan
- 2004: Tractor
- 200––2006: Saba Battery
- 2006–2008: Saba Battery
- 2008: Mes Kerman
- 2008–2009: Shahrdari Tabriz
- 2009–2010: Saba Qom
- 2011: Paykan (caretaker)
- 2011–2012: Gostaresh Foolad
- 2012–2014: Naft Gachsaran
- * Club domestic league appearances and goals

Mohammad Hossein Ziaei (Persian: محمدحسین ضیایی) is an Iranian football manager currently coaching Naft Gachsaran in the Azadegan League.

== Club career ==
He played as a defender for Shahin F.C. and Tractor during the 1980s and played one season in Hungary for Vasas SC.

== Coaching career ==
He started his coaching career, as coach of Tractor and currently coaches Saba Battery F.C. He was replaced by Rasoul Korbekandi in November 2009. He was caretaker head coach of Paykan in 2011.

As of 10 November 2009

Team	From	To	Record							
Team	From	To	G	W	D	L	Win %	GF	GA	+/-
Saba	July 2009	10 November 2009	16	6	2	8	37.5%	23	23	0
Total			16	6	3	8	37.5%	23	23	0
