= Tractor S.C. =

Iranian football club

Tractor
- Full name: Tractor Azerbaijan Cultural Sports Club
- Nicknames: Tractor (South Azerbaijani: تیراختور Tīraxtur); The Red Wolves (South Azerbaijani: قیرمیزی‌ قوردلار Qırmızı Qurdlar)
- Founded: 1970; 56 years ago
- Stadium: Sahand Stadium
- Capacity: 66,833
- Owner: Mohammad Reza Zonuzi
- President: Seyed Hojjat Karimi
- Head coach: Javad Nekounam
- League: Persian Gulf Pro League
- 2025–26: Persian Gulf Pro League, 2nd (season unfinished)
- Website: www.tractor-club.com
| Home colours | Away colours | Third colours |

Tractor Cultural and Sports Club of Azerbaijan (Persian: باشگاه فرهنگی ورزشی تراکتور آذربایجان, Bâšgâh-e Farhangi Varzeši-e Terâktor-e Âzarbâijân) (South Azerbaijani: تیراختور آذربایجان فوتبال کولوبو, Tiraxtur Azərbaycan Futbol Klubu) commonly known as Tractor, formerly Tractor Sazi, is an Iranian professional football club based in Tabriz, East Azerbaijan, that competes in the Persian Gulf Pro League. The club was founded in 1970 by the Iran Tractor Manufacturing Company.

Since the beginning of the 1996–97 season, Tractor has played its home games at the Sahand which has a seating capacity of 66,833 though it is able to hold more people during important matches. Tractor holds the attendance record for a promoted team in Iranian football when they had an estimated average attendance about 57,000 during the 2009–10 season. The club is owned and supported by the businessman Mohammad Reza Zonuzi since 2018.

Tractor is the only professional football club based in Tabriz and has become one of Iran's most successful teams in recent years, having clinched the championship of the 2024–25 Persian Gulf Pro League, as well as having won two Hazfi Cups and one Azadegan League title. The club's color is red and black, known as the Red Wolves among its own fans.

== History ==
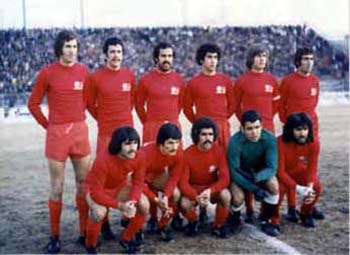
Tractor's squad in 1974 before a Takht Jamshid Cup match

=== Pre-Revolution ===
Tractor Sazi was formed in 1969 in support of the Tractor Manufacturing Company. They played in the Pasargad League for five years until 1975. They finished 1975–76 as the winner of the Pasargard League and were promoted to the Takht Jamshid Cup (now the Iran Pro League). In their first season in the Takht Jamshid Cup, they were in poor form, and as a result they were relegated to the Pasargard League after just one year in the first division. They also lost the Hazfi Cup final to Malavan in the cup's inaugural edition. After their relegation, Hossein Fekri remained as the club's manager and led them to a return to the first division for the 1977–78 season, which they finished in 5th place. In the 1978–79 season, which never finished due to the Iranian Revolution, they were in 8th place with twelve matches played. Their rival at the time was Machine Sazi, also based in Tabriz.

=== Post-Revolution ===
In the 1980s the national league was suspended due to the Iran–Iraq War, therefore Tractor were forced to compete in the Tabriz Local Leagues for many years. In the 1986–87 Qods League the East Azerbaijan Provincial team, with a mix of players from Tractor and rivals Machine Sazi, made it to the final, but were defeated in the final by the Isfahan Provincial team.

==== 1990s ====
Romanian coach Vasile Godja was in charge of Tractor's youth teams from 1986. He was also a worker at the Tractor Company and discovered various talents as the B team's coach. He also discovered and trained various talented players like Karim Bargheri, Sirous Dinmohammadi, Alireza Nikmer and Hossein Khatibi which, in time, played for Iran's national team. In 1990, he was promoted to first team coach and led the club in the 1992–93 season, finishing third place in the national competition. Esmail Halali was their star in this period. Under his leadership in 1994, Tractor made the finals of the Hazfi Cup again, this time losing to Bahman in the final, and won the MILLS International cup in India in 1995.

Godja left the team in 1997 after eight years in charge of the club. Mohammad Hossein Ziaei then became the player-coach of Tractor. At this time, notable players of the team started their migration to the other clubs. 1998 to 2001 they finished the league in mid-table.

=== Iran Pro League ===
In 2001, IRIFF formed the Iran Pro League as the professional league. The inaugural 2001–02 season under Reza Vatankhah and Mahmoud Yavari's management, saw Tractor relegated to the Azadegan League after the club finished bottom of the league.

==== Relegation to Azadegan League ====
Tractor spent seven seasons in the Azadegan League and were unable to climb to the Iran Pro League. Tractor qualified for the promotion play-off in the 2006–07 season but lost to Shirin Faraz 4–2. After the appointment of Faraz Kamalvand as the manager before the 2008–09 season, Tractor were promoted to the Iran Pro League for the first time in 8 years.

==== Return to Pro League ====
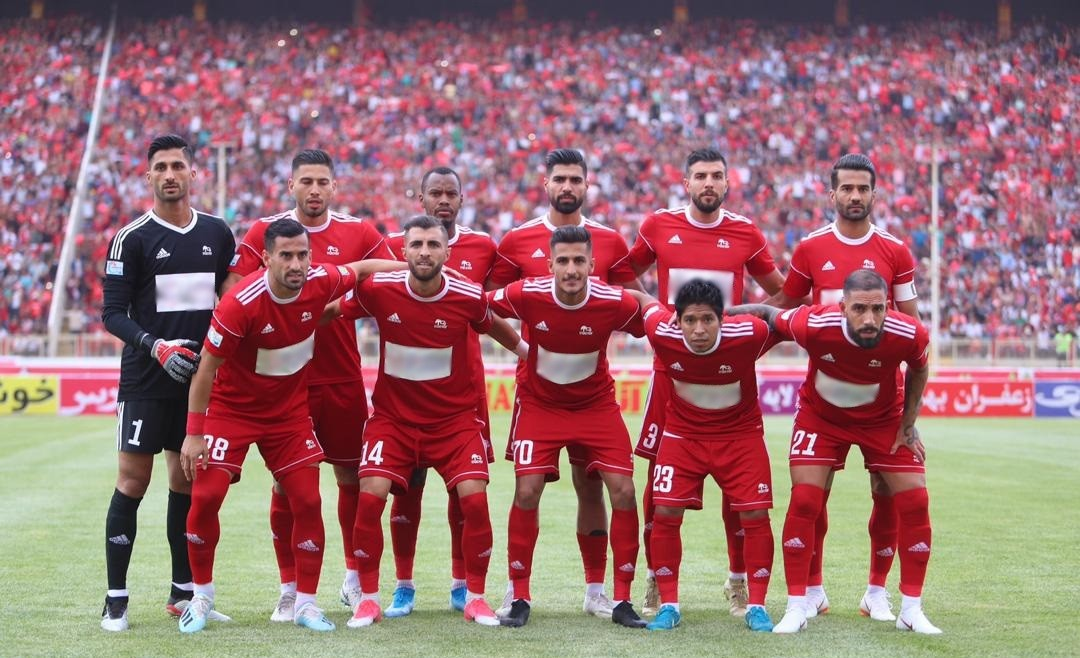
Tractor players in 2019–20 season.

In the 2011–12 season and under Amir Ghalenoei's management, Tractor finished as runners-up, securing a spot for the 2013 AFC Champions League. This was the first time Tractor had qualified for the competition, subsequently qualifying for the 2014 and 2015 editions as well. In July 2012, former Benfica and Sevilla coach, Toni (Oliveira) was named as the club's manager. He led the club to a runners up finish in the Pro League.

==== Champions League ====
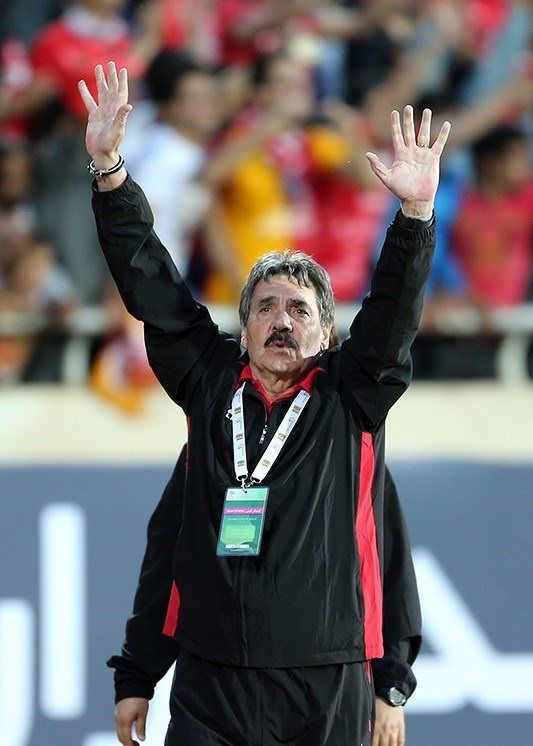
Toni, who won the 2013–14 Hazfi Cup and ended up as runners up in 2012–13 and 2014–15 Pro League.

After a fall out between Oliveira and the club chairman, Oliveira was sacked and Majid Jalali was brought in for the 2013–14 season. After a poor run of results, Jalali was fired and Toni returned, almost immediately leading Tractor to the Hazfi Cup title, and a place in the 2015 AFC Champions League. They also finished the season in the 6th place, after they defeated Esteghlal 3–1 in the last match at Azadi Stadium. Tractor were also unable to qualify for the knock-out stage of the AFC Champions League for the second consecutive year, after they finished 4th in their group in both the 2013 and 2014 editions. In 2015, Tractor again were eliminated in the group stage of the AFC Champions League for the third straight time.

On 15 May 2015, the final match of the season was played between Tractor and Naft Tehran. The match took place at Sahand Stadium in Tabriz. After communication issues at the stadium, Tractor staff mistakenly thought that Sepahan was losing to Saipa, which would mean Tractor would win the league with a draw. Tractor tied the game, believing that a 3–3 draw with Naft had won them the title. While they were celebrating with their fans on the field, they found out that the actual result of the parallel game was 2–0 for Sepahan and that Sepahan were league champions. Tractor finished as runners-up for the third time, with Amir Ghalenoi in 2011–12 and Toni in 2012–13 and 2014–15.

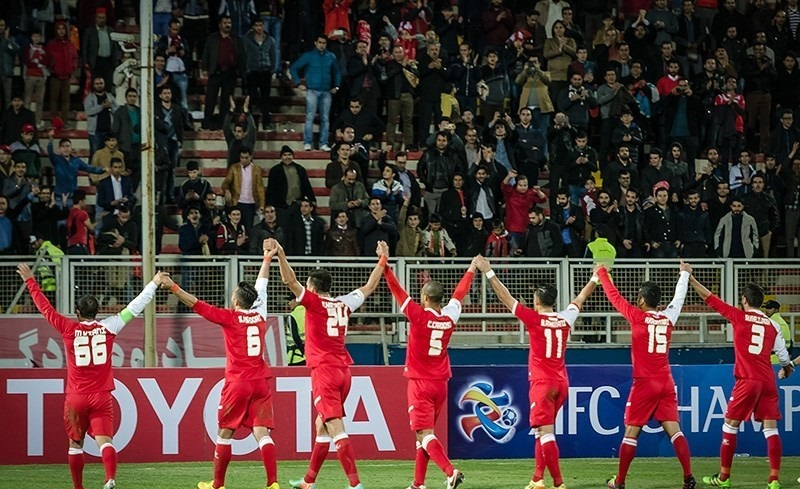
Celebration after a 2–0 win against Pakhtakor in 2016 AFC Champions League group stage match.

Midway through the 2015–16 season, Tractor head coach Toni was once again sacked and replaced by Amir Ghalenoi. On 24 February, Tractor won their first match of the 2016 AFC Champions League in a 4–0 win against Emirati club Al Jazira. Tractor won the return leg 1–0 on 2 March in Abu Dhabi as well. After the first two games, Tractor surpassed the most points they ever gained in the AFC Champions League group stage. Tractor qualified for the knock-out stages for the first time in their history after defeating Saudi club Al-Hilal 2–0. Tractor eventually lost in the round of 16 to Emirati club Al Nasr.

In the 2016–17 season, Tractor defeated Zob Ahan in the semi-final of the Hazfi Cup to reach the final against Naft Tehran. In January 2017, it was revealed that Tractor had been suspended from two transfer windows by FIFA, due to outstanding debts to former players. This led to the club terminating the contract of Sajjad Shahbazzadeh, whom they had signed days earlier. In July 2024, Tractor appointed Dragan Skocic as manager. In his first season with the team, Skocic won the Iranian league for the first time in Tractor's history.. Tractor followed this up by also winning the Iranian Super Cup in 2025.

== Fans ==
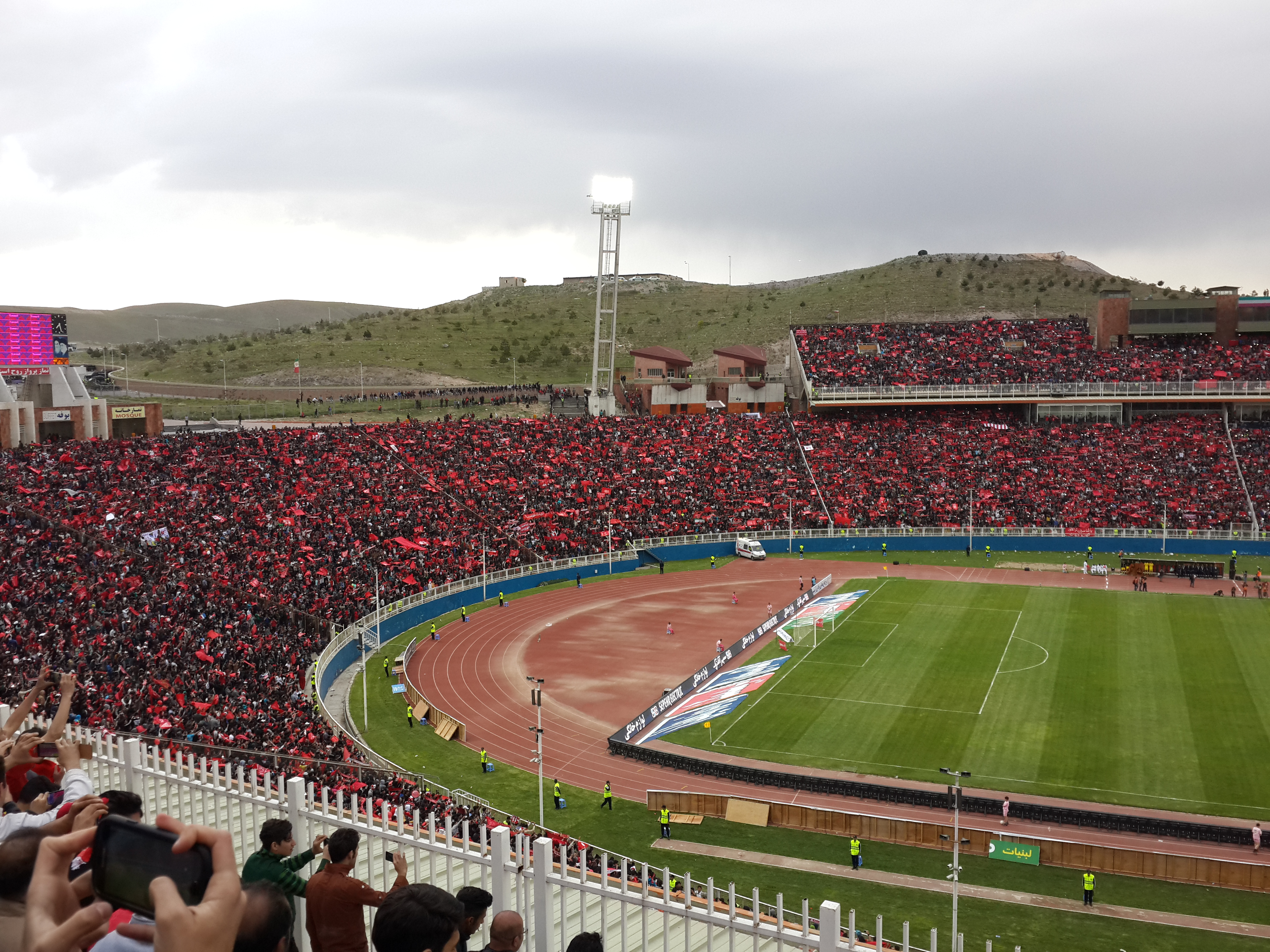
Fans before a Pro League match.

=== Official anthem ===
There are a lot of popular marches for Tractor, but 'Tiraxtur iftixarımız' (meaning 'Tractor is our pride' in Azerbaijani), created and implemented in 2012, was chosen as the official anthem.

=== Supporters and ethnic identity ===
The club has developed a large and highly devoted supporter base among Iran's Azerbaijani Turkic population. Beyond its sporting role, Tractor S.C. has been widely described in academic and policy literature as a focal point for expressions of Azerbaijani cultural identity and political sentiment within Iran. Scholars have noted that the club's matches have, at times, provided a rare public space for mass gatherings in which supporters articulate grievances related to cultural and linguistic rights, including slogans referencing perceived ethnic discrimination in Iran and demands for education in the Azerbaijani Turkic language. In this context, some analysts argue that the club has become an important symbolic arena for the articulation of Azerbaijani nationalism in the Islamic Republic of Iran, reflecting broader tensions over ethnic identity and state policy toward minority languages and regional autonomy.

During matches at Sahand Stadium in Tabriz, particularly in high-profile fixtures, Tractor S.C. supporters have been documented chanting political and cultural slogans linked to ethnic Azerbaijani identity. Some supporters carry the flag of the Republic of Azerbaijan and even reference regional political conflicts involving the republic of Azerbaijan and Armenia. In several matches, chants emerged during key moments of games calling for cultural and linguistic rights, including the right to education in the Turkic Azerbaijani language, as well as expressions of solidarity with women. Academic studies describe Tractor S.C. supporters as using coordinated chants during the 15th minute of matches to demand education in their mother tongue, with slogans referencing the right to instruction in Azerbaijani/Turkic under Article 15 of the Iranian Constitution.

These chants and other ethnolinguistic slogans by Tractor supporters have been subject to repeated media restrictions and audio suppression in Iranian state broadcasting, particularly during televised matches where political or ethnically sensitive slogans were chanted in stadiums. Fans have been reported chanting slogans in Azerbaijani expressing support for women's rights and gender equality.

"Oh my mother, sister and wife.

You are ladies! Men and women are equal.

Attending in community is your natural right.

Azerbaijani Turk ladies, rise and get your rights!"

A portion of supporters are primarily motivated by the opportunity to gather in a communal setting where they may express political and cultural sentiments, including currents of Azerbaijani ethnic identity and, in some cases, separatist or autonomist viewpoints for south Azerbaijan. Some observers have compared elements of Tractor S.C. supporter culture and Pan-Turkism nationalism to other ethno-regional movements such as Catalan nationalism.

In 2016, Tractor reportedly held negotiations to sign Armenian international defender Varazdat Haroyan. However, the transfer was abandoned before a contract was signed. According to the CEO of Tractor Mostafa Ajorlu, the move was cancelled because he believed that signing an Armenian national team player could threaten the unity of the club's supporters.

== Crest ==
From its foundation, the team used a red crest. On the exterior circle, the name of the club and the date of its foundation were written. The second crest was white until 2013, when the club changed the color of the crest to black.

== Kit ==
The club was previously sponsored by the Hamrah-e Aval (Mobile Telecommunication Company). In July 2018, it signed a contract with Merooj, starting from 2017–18 Iran Pro League season.

| Years | Shirt sponsors |
|---|---|
| 1970–2009 | TMC |
| 2007–2010 | Bank Sepah |
| 2009–2012 | Hamrah-e Aval |
| 2012–2014 | Javanane Khayer Foundation |
| 2013–2016 | Aysan Tabriz |
| 2014–2017 | Hamrah-e Aval |
| 2017–2018 | Irancell |
| 2018–2019 | Kowsar Credit Institution |
| 2019– | ATA Airlines |

| Years | Kit manufacturers |
|---|---|
| 1970–1974 | Umbro |
| 1974–2005 | Puma |
| 2005–2010 | Daei Sport |
| 2010–2013 | Uhlsport |
| 2013–2014 | Merooj |
| 2014–2017 | Kelme |
| 2017–2018 | Li-Ning |
| 2018–2019 | Merooj |
| 2019–2021 | Adidas |
| 2021–2025 | Start |
| 2025– | KAPSPOR |

== Ownership ==
The club is owned by the Tractor Manufacturing Company since its establishment in 1970. Since 2011, it has been owned by Kowsar Foundation (51%), with 30% of the club belonging to the East-Azerbaijan Province. In addition, the Iranian Mehr Institute is an affiliate of Kowsar Foundation and other stakeholders and custodians of the club. Kowsar Foundation is part of Sepah Pasdaran – with the club enabling its players to complete their military service. Since 2018, the club has been owned by Mohammad Reza Zonouzi, an Iranian businessman and shareholder.

== Rivals ==
Tractor has most rivalry with two big Iranian football clubs, Esteghlal and Persepolis.

=== Persepolis–Tractor rivalry ===
Persepolis–Tractor rivalry started in 2009, when Tractor returned to first tier of Iranian football league after eight years, and their fans were passionate about this event. Mustafa Denizli is one of the club's most popular coaches in this rivalry. In 2019, Tractor defeated Persepolis after more than five years, when Denizli was the head coach. In 2025, they were defeated by Persepolis 0–2. In 2026, Tractor defeated Persepolis 1–0.

=== Esteghlal–Tractor rivalry ===
This rivalry started in 2009, and in the past years this rivalry has taken a violent turn, making it one of the most important sport events in the country. On 10 May 2015, Tractor defeated Esteghlal with four goals. On 1 November 2019, they were beaten 2–4 by Esteghlal in Yadegar-e Emam Stadium. On 4 April 2025, Tractor beat Esteghlal 2–1 in the Persian Gulf Pro League. On 11 August 2025, Tractor beat Esteghlal 2–1 in the Iran Super Cup.

=== Machine Sazi–Tractor rivalry ===
Tractor had a brotherly relationship with Machine Sazi (another football club from Tabriz). During the 1970s, both Tractor and Machine Sazi met regularly in the Takht Jamshid Cup, and both teams had some memorable successes in the fixture. Following the creation of the Azadegan League, Machine Sazi and Tractor met twice in the 1996–97 Azadegan League.

Machine Sazi's promotion to the Iran Pro League in 2016 saw fans eagerly anticipating the first league derbies in seven years. However, in 2022, after a transfer of ownership and multiple relegations, Machine Sazi dissolved due to financial issues.

== Affiliated clubs ==
- (Russia) Rubin Kazan
- (Turkey) Trabzonspor
- (Iran) Sepahan
- (Azerbaijan) Sumgayit FK

== Stadium ==
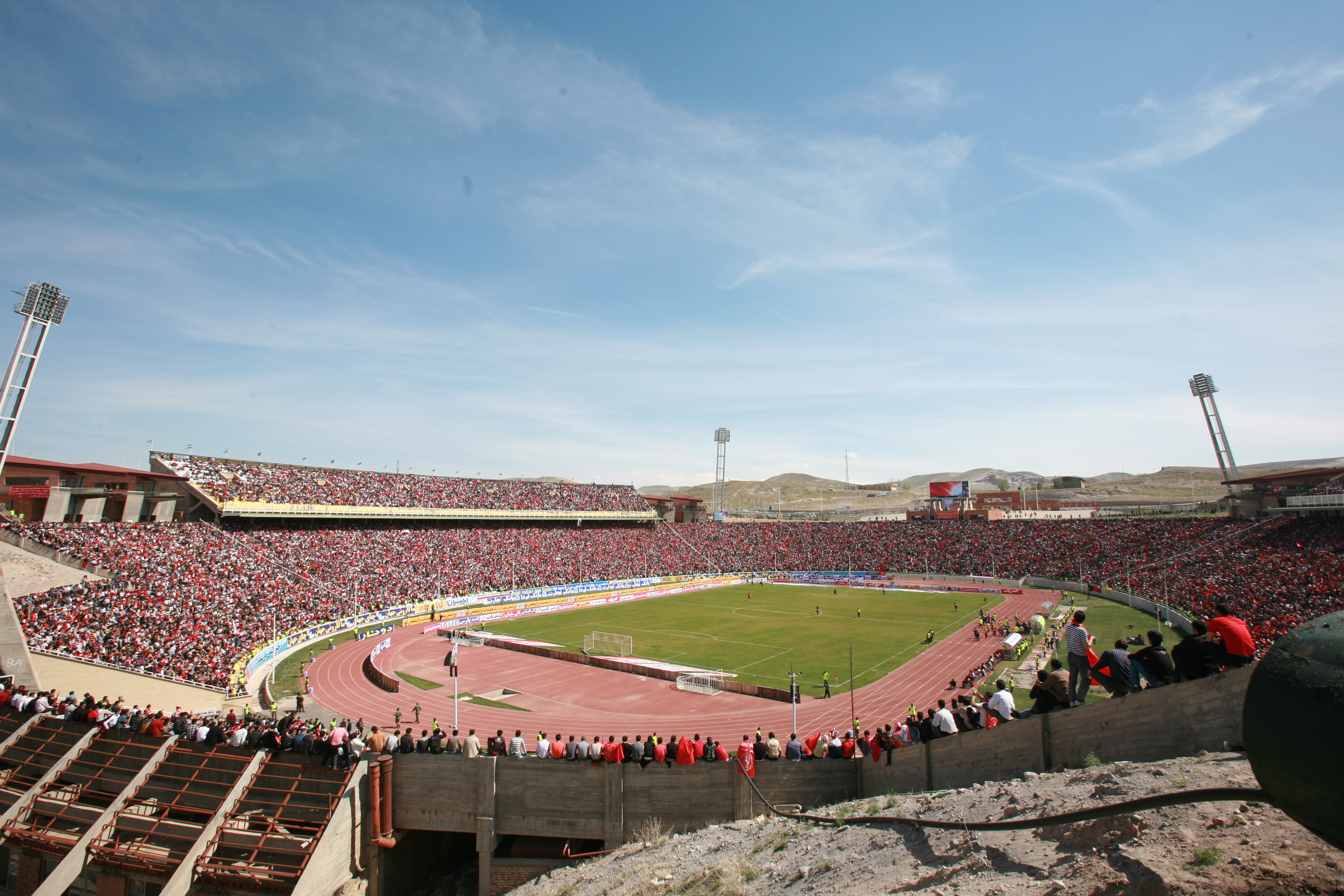
استادیوم یادگار امام.

Tractor played their home matches from 1979 until 1996 in the 20,000 capacity Bagh Shomal Stadium (Takhti Stadium), 1976 AFC Asian Cup stadium. Sahand Stadium (Yadegar-e Emam Stadium) was replaced with Bagh-e Shomal Stadium after it was completed in January 1996. The stadium is the second biggest stadium in Iran with 66,833 seats. The stadium is also part of Tabriz Olympic Complex.

During Sahand Stadium's renovation from 2005 to 2006, Bakeri Stadium was the club's home ground in the Azadegan League matches. The stadium has a 10,000 seater capacity.

== Players ==
=== Current squad ===
As of 27 August 2026

Note: Flags indicate national team as defined under FIFA eligibility rules; some limited exceptions apply. Players may hold more than one non-FIFA nationality.

| No. | Pos. | Nation | Player |
|---|---|---|---|
| 2 | DF | IRI | Mehdi Shiri |
| 3 | DF | IRI | Shojae Khalilzadeh (captain) |
| 4 | DF | IRI | Milad Zakipour |
| 5 | MF | UZB | Odiljon Hamrobekov |
| 6 | MF | IRI | Mehdi Hosseini |
| 7 | MF | CRO | Tibor Halilović |
| 8 | MF | CRO | Igor Postonjski |
| 9 | FW | IRI | Mahdi Torabi ^{INJ} |
| 10 | MF | IRI | Hadi Habibinejad |
| 11 | DF | IRI | Danial Esmaeilifar (vice-captain) |
| 17 | MF | IRI | Masoud Zaer Kazemayn |

| No. | Pos. | Nation | Player |
|---|---|---|---|
| 18 | DF | IRI | Sadegh Moharrami |
| 19 | FW | CRO | Tomislav Štrkalj |
| 20 | FW | IRI | Mehdi Hashemnejad ^{U25} (vice-captain) |
| 22 | DF | IRI | Mohammad Naderi (vice-captain) |
| 23 | GK | IRI | Yasin Zare ^{U19} |
| 33 | DF | IRI | Farshad Faraji |
| 58 | DF | IRI | Mohammad Daneshgar |
| 70 | FW | IRI | Shahriyar Moghanlou |
| 81 | GK | IRI | Parsa Jafari |
| 88 | DF | IRI | Saeid Karimazar ^{U25} |
| 99 | FW | IRI | Amirhossein Hosseinzadeh |

- U21 = Under 21 year player. U23 = Under 23 year player. INJ = Out of main squad due to injury.

For recent transfers, see List of Iranian football transfers summer 2025.

=== Reserve team players ===
Note: Flags indicate national team as defined under FIFA eligibility rules; some limited exceptions apply. Players may hold more than one non-FIFA nationality.

| No. | Pos. | Nation | Player |
|---|---|---|---|
| 21 | MF | IRI | Ali Asghar Samarivafa ^{U19} |
| 25 | MF | IRI | Amir Mohammad Mahmoudi ^{U21} |
| 27 | FW | IRI | Amirali Khorrami ^{U21} |
| 28 | MF | IRI | Sajjad Khademi ^{U23} |
| 31 | GK | IRI | Amir Hossein Gholonji ^{U21} |
| 44 | DF | IRI | Erfan Darvishaali ^{U21} |

| No. | Pos. | Nation | Player |
|---|---|---|---|
| 46 | GK | IRI | Mohammad Feyzi ^{U21} |
| 71 | MF | IRI | Morteza Fazeli ^{U19} |
| 72 | MF | IRI | Abolfazl Toreyfi ^{U21} |
| 77 | MF | IRI | Karrar Namari ^{U21} |
| 86 | FW | IRI | Ali Akbar Saghebi ^{U21} |

=== Out on loan ===
Note: Flags indicate national team as defined under FIFA eligibility rules; some limited exceptions apply. Players may hold more than one non-FIFA nationality.

| No. | Pos. | Nation | Player |
|---|---|---|---|
| — | GK | IRI | Alireza Beiranvand (at Fajr Sepasi until 30 June 2027) |
| — | GK | IRI | Adib Zarei (at Shams Azar until 30 June 2027) |
| — | MF | IRI | Mohammad Mehdi Jannia (at Mes Shahr-e Babak until 30 June 2027) |

== Recent seasons ==
The table below chronicles the achievements of Tractor in various competitions.

| Season | League | Position | Hazfi Cup | ACL | Notes |
|---|---|---|---|---|---|
| 1971–72 | Local League | 4th | Not held | Not held | Region C |
| 1972–73 | 2nd Division | 4th | Not held | Not held | Group B |
| 1973–74 | 2nd Division | 2nd | Not held | Not held | |
| 1974–75 | 2nd Division | 1st | Not held | Not held | Promoted |
| 1975–76 | Takht Jamshid Cup | 16th | Runner Up | Not held | Relegated |
| 1976–77 | 2nd Division | 2nd | 1/8 Final | Not held | Promoted |
| 1977–78 | Takht Jamshid Cup | 5th | Not held | Not held | |
| 1978–79 | Takht Jamshid Cup | Did not finish | Not held | Not held | |
| 1980–81 | Tabriz Football League | 10th | Not held | Did not qualify | Relegated |
| 1981–82 | Tabriz Football League's 2nd Div. | 1st | Not held | Did not qualify | Promoted |
| 1982–83 | Tabriz Football League | 6th | Not held | Did not qualify | |
| 1983–84 | Tabriz Football League | 5th | Not held | Did not qualify | |
| 1984–85 | Tabriz Football League | 1st | Not held | Did not qualify | |
| 1985–86 | Tabriz Football League | 2nd | Not held | Did not qualify | |
| 1986–87 | Tabriz Football League | 3rd | Not held | Did not qualify | |
| 1987–88 | Tabriz Football League | 2nd | Not held | Did not qualify | |
| 1988–89 | Tabriz Football League | 2nd | Not held | Did not qualify | |
| 1989–90 | Qods League | 4th | Quarter-finals | Did not qualify | |
| 1990–91 | 2nd Division | 3rd | 1/8 final | Did not qualify | Promoted |
| 1991–92 | Azadegan League | 10th | Not held | Did not qualify | |
| 1992–93 | Azadegan League | 3rd | Not held | Did not qualify | |
| 1993–94 | Azadegan League | 8th | Runner Up | Did not qualify | |
| 1994–95 | Azadegan League | 9th | First round | Did not qualify | Relegated |
| 1995–96 | 2nd Division | 2nd | Second Round | Did not qualify | Promoted |
| 1996–97 | Azadegan League | 11th | Second round | Did not qualify | |
| 1997–98 | Azadegan League | 9th | Not held | Did not qualify | |
| 1998–99 | Azadegan League | 11th | Second round | Did not qualify | |
| 1999–00 | Azadegan League | 6th | 1/16 final | Did not qualify | |
| 2000–01 | Azadegan League | 12th | Second round | Did not qualify | |
| 2001–02 | Iran Pro League | 14th | Third round | Did not qualify | Relegated |
| 2002–03 | Azadegan League | 3rd | Second round | Did not qualify | |
| 2003–04 | Azadegan League | 8th | Third round | Did not qualify | |
| 2004–05 | Azadegan League | 7th | Third round | Did not qualify | |
| 2005–06 | Azadegan League | 2nd | Second round | Did not qualify | |
| 2006–07 | Azadegan League | 1st | Second round | Did not qualify | Promoted to Play Off |
| 2007–08 | Azadegan League | 4th | 1/16 final | Did not qualify | |
| 2008–09 | Azadegan League | 1st | Quarter-finals | Did not qualify | Promoted |
| 2009–10 | Persian Gulf Cup | 7th | Second round | Did not qualify | |
| 2010–11 | Persian Gulf Cup | 5th | 1/8 final | Did not qualify | |
| 2011–12 | Persian Gulf Cup | 2nd | 1/16 final | Did not qualify | |
| 2012–13 | Persian Gulf Cup | 2nd | 1/8 final | Group stage | |
| 2013–14 | Persian Gulf Cup | 6th | Champion | Group stage | |
| 2014–15 | Persian Gulf Cup | 2nd | 1/16 final | Group stage | |
| 2015–16 | Persian Gulf Cup | 4th | Semi-final | 1/8 final | |
| 2016–17 | Persian Gulf Cup | 3rd | Runner Up | did not qualify | |
| 2017–18 | Persian Gulf Cup | 10th | Quarter-finals | Group stage | |
| 2018–19 | Persian Gulf Cup | 5th | Round of 32 | did not qualify | |
| 2019–20 | Persian Gulf Cup | 4th | Champion | did not qualify | |
| 2020–21 | Persian Gulf Cup | 4th | 1/8 final | 1/8 final | |
| 2021–22 | Persian Gulf Cup | 13th | 1/16 final | Did not qualify | |
| 2022–23 | Persian Gulf Cup | 4th | 1/16 final | Did not qualify | |
| 2023–24 | Persian Gulf Cup | 4th | Quarter-finals | Did not qualify | |
| 2024–25 | Persian Gulf Cup | 1st | 1/16 final | Quarter-finals | |

== Honours ==
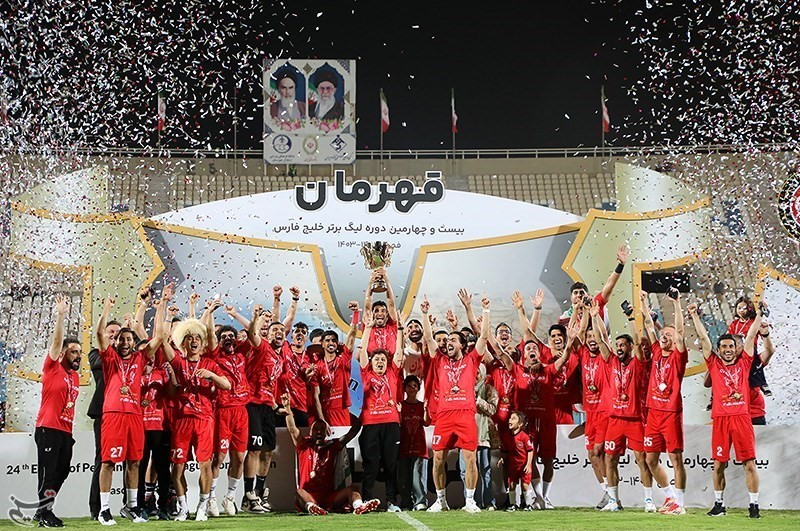
Tractor's championship celebration in the 2024–25 Iran Pro League season.

=== Official titles ===
- Iran Pro League

(gold) Winner (1): 2024–25
(silver) Runner up (3): 2011–12, 2012–13, 2014–15
(bronze) Third Place (2): 1992–93, 2016–17

- Hazfi Cup

(gold) Winner (2): 2013–14, 2019–20
(silver) Runner up (3): 1975–76, 1994–95, 2016–17

- Iranian Super Cup

(gold) Winner (1): 2025
(silver) Runner up (1): 2020

- Azadegan League (2nd Tier)

(gold) Winner (1): 2008–09

- 2nd Division

(gold) Winner (1): 1974–75
(silver) Runner up (2): 1976–77, 1995–96

- East Azerbaijan Super Cup

(gold) Winner (1): 1992

- Tabriz Football League

(gold) Winner (1): 1984–85

- Tabriz Football League's 2nd Division

(gold) Winner (1): 1981–82

=== Unofficial titles ===
- (India) DCM Trophy

(gold) Winner (1): 1995–96

- (Iran) Sardaran Shahid International Cup

(gold) Winner (2): 1995, 1996

- (Iran) Shohada Cup

(gold) Winner (2): 2014, 2017

== Personnel ==
=== Current coaching staff ===
| Position | Staff |
|---|---|
| Head coach | (Iran) Javad Nekounam |
| Assistant coaches | (Slovenia) Sanel Konjević (Croatia) Dino Žižka |
| Goalkeeper coach | (Croatia) Mladen Žganjer |
| Fitness coach | (Iran) Hamidreza Joudaki |
| Technical manager | (Iran) Yousef Bakhshi Zadeh |
| Team manager | (Iran) Khodadad Azizi |
| Translator | (Iran) Hamidreza Hedayati |

=== Management ===
| Position | Staff |
|---|---|
| Owner | Mohammad Reza Zonouzi |
| President | Saeid Mozaffarizadeh |
| Board chairman | Abbas Elyasi |
| Board members | Alireza Navin; Mohammad Javad Dolfkar; Ghafour Kargari; Dara Ghaznavi; Mohammad Ali Mojtahedi; Saeed Abbasi |
| Fans club president | Esmaeil Ghilichkhani |
| Academy manager | Sadegh Pourhossein |

== Sports statistics ==
- Updated to May 2017.

=== General information ===
Details
| Concept | Times |
|---|---|
| Seasons in Iran 1st Tier League | 23 |
| Seasons in Iran 2nd Tier League | 12 |
| Promotions to Iran 1st Tier League | 4 |
| Participations in the Hazfi Cup | 27 |
| Participations in Asian competitions | 5 |
| All-time best position in Persian Gulf Pro League | 2nd * |

* They are assured first place in the 2024–25 Persian Gulf Pro League, but the season is still in progress.

== Asian record ==
=== Asian Club Championship / AFC Champions League ===
Accurate as of 12 March 2025

| Competition | Played | Won | Drew | Lost | GF | GA | GD | Win% |
|---|---|---|---|---|---|---|---|---|
| AFC Champions League | 40 | 9 | 11 | 20 | 40 | 58 | −18 | 22.50 |
| AFC Champions League Two | 8 | 4 | 4 | 0 | 23 | 10 | +13 | 50.00 |

Legend: GF = Goals For. GA = Goals Against. GD = Goal Difference.

Asian Club Championship / AFC Champions League
| Season | Competition | Round | Rival | Home | Away | Agg. |
|---|---|---|---|---|---|---|
| 2013 | AFC Champions League | Group stage (Group A) | (United Arab Emirates) Al-Jazira | 3–1 | 0–2 | – |
| 2013 | AFC Champions League | Group stage (Group A) | (Qatar) El Jaish | 2–4 | 3–3 | – |
| 2013 | AFC Champions League | Group stage (Group A) | (Saudi Arabia) Al-Shabab | 0–1 | 0–1 | – |
| 2014 | AFC Champions League | Group stage (Group C) | (Saudi Arabia) Al-Ittihad | 1–0 | 0–2 | – |
| 2014 | AFC Champions League | Group stage (Group C) | (Qatar) Lekhwiya | 0–1 | 0–0 | – |
| 2014 | AFC Champions League | Group stage (Group C) | (United Arab Emirates) Al-Ain | 2–2 | 1–3 | – |
| 2015 | AFC Champions League | Group stage (Group D) | (Uzbekistan) Nasaf Qarshi | 1–2 | 1–2 | – |
| 2015 | AFC Champions League | Group stage (Group D) | (United Arab Emirates) Al-Ahli | 1–0 | 2–3 | – |
| 2015 | AFC Champions League | Group stage (Group D) | (Saudi Arabia) Al-Ahli | 2–2 | 0–2 | – |
| 2016 | AFC Champions League | Group stage (Group C) | (United Arab Emirates) Al-Jazira | 4–0 | 1–0 | – |
| 2016 | AFC Champions League | Group stage (Group C) | (Uzbekistan) Pakhtakor | 2–0 | 0–1 | – |
| 2016 | AFC Champions League | Group stage (Group C) | (Saudi Arabia) Al-Hilal | 1–2 | 2–0 | – |
| 2016 | AFC Champions League | Round of 16 | (United Arab Emirates) Al-Nasr | 3–1 | 1–4 | 4–5 |
| 2018 | AFC Champions League | Group stage (Group A) | (United Arab Emirates) Al-Jazira | 1–1 | 0–0 | – |
| 2018 | AFC Champions League | Group stage (Group A) | (Saudi Arabia) Al-Ahli | 0–1 | 0–2 | – |
| 2018 | AFC Champions League | Group stage (Group A) | (Qatar) Al-Gharafa | 1–3 | 0–3 | – |
| 2021 | AFC Champions League | Group stage (Group B) | (Uzbekistan) Pakhtakor | 0–0 | 3–3 | – |
| 2021 | AFC Champions League | Group stage (Group B) | (United Arab Emirates) Sharjah | 0–0 | 0–2 | – |
| 2021 | AFC Champions League | Group stage (Group B) | (Iraq) Al-Quwa Al-Jawiya | 1–0 | 0–0 | – |
| 2021 | AFC Champions League | Round of 16 | (Saudi Arabia) Al-Nassr | 0–1 | | - |
| 2023–24 | AFC Champions League | Play-off round | (United Arab Emirates) Sharjah | 1–3 | | – |
| 2024–25 | AFC Champions League Two | Group stage (Group A) | (India) Mohun Bagan SG | Withdrawn | | – |
| 2024–25 | AFC Champions League Two | Group stage (Group A) | (Tajikistan) Ravshan Kulob | 3–1 | 7–0 | – |
| 2024–25 | AFC Champions League Two | Group stage (Group A) | (Qatar) Al-Wakrah | 3–0 | 3–3 | – |
| 2024–25 | AFC Champions League Two | Round of 16 | (Bahrain) Al-Khaldiya | 2–1 | 3–3 | 5–4 |
| 2024–25 | AFC Champions League Two | Quarterfinals | (Saudi Arabia) Al Taawoun | 0–0 | 2–2 | 2–2 (2–4 p) |

=== Top goalscorers in ACL Elite + ACL 2 ===
| Rank | Player | Goals | Seasons |
|---|---|---|---|
| 1 | (Iran) Amirhossein Hosseinzadeh | 8 | 1 |
| 2 | (Iran) Mohammad Abbaszadeh | 4 | 1 |
| 2 | (Iran) Farzad Hatami | 4 | 2 |
| 3 | (Brazil) Geílson Soares | 3 | 1 |
| 3 | (Croatia) Tomislav Štrkalj | 3 | 1 |
| 3 | (Iran) Bakhtiar Rahmani | 3 | 1 |
| 4 | (Iran) Mehdi Seyed-Salehi | 2 | 1 |
| 4 | (Brazil) Edinho | 2 | 1 |
| 4 | (Cameroon) Aloys Nong | 2 | 1 |
| 4 | (Brazil) Augusto | 2 | 1 |
| 4 | (Iran) Farshad Ahmadzadeh | 2 | 2 |
| 4 | (Iran) Mohammad Iranpourian | 2 | 4 |
| 4 | (Iran) Ashkan Dejagah | 1 | 1 |
| 4 | (Iran) Mehdi Tikdari | 1 | 1 |
| 4 | (Iran) Karim Ansarifard | 1 | 1 |
| 4 | (Iran) Saeed Daghighi | 1 | 1 |
| 4 | (Portugal) Flávio Paixão | 1 | 1 |
| 4 | (Iran) Mehdi Sharifi | 1 | 1 |
| 4 | (Iran) Saeid Aghaei | 1 | 1 |
| 4 | (Iran) Shoja' Khalilzadeh | 1 | 1 |
| 4 | (Iran) Shahin Saghebi | 1 | 2 |
| 4 | (Iran) Javad Kazemian | 1 | 2 |
| 4 | (Iran) Masoud Ebrahimzadeh | 1 | 2 |
| 4 | (Iran) Milad Fakhreddini | 1 | 3 |

== Individual records ==
Lists of the players with the most caps and top goalscorers for the club, as of 3 June 2019.Mohammad Ebrahimi is the club's all-time most capped player and top scorer with 31 goals in 180 games. This list includes goals from all competitive matches.

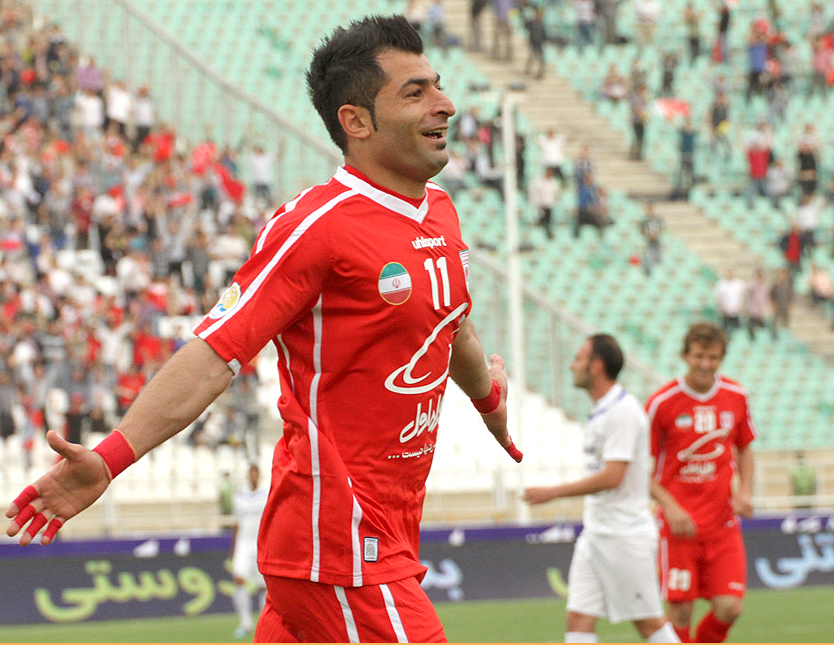
Mohammad Ebrahimi is leading all time goalscorer's list for the club.

=== All Top Scorers ===
| # | Name | Nationality | Goals |
|---|---|---|---|
| 1 | Ahad Sheykhlari | Iran | 111 |
| 2 | Mohammad Ebrahimi | Iran | 34 |
| 2 | Mohammad Abbaszadeh | Iran | 34 |
| 4 | Farzad Hatami | Iran | 31 |
| 5 | Edinho | Brazil | 29 |
| 6 | Mohammad Iranpourian | Iran | 28 |
| 7 | Amirhossein Hosseinzadeh | Iran | 23 |
| 8 | Flavio Lopes | Brazil | 21 |
| 9 | Mehdi Seyed-Salehi | Iran | 19 |
| 10 | Reza Asadi | Iran | 18 |
| 11 | Saman Nariman Jahan | Iran | 17 |
| 12 | Mehdi Hashemnejad | Iran | 15 |

=== All Top Appearances ===
| # | Name | Nationality | Apps |
|---|---|---|---|
| 1 | Ahad Sheykhlari | Iran | 452 |
| 2 | Mehdi Kiani | Iran | 296 |
| 3 | Mohammad Ebrahimi | Iran | 216 |
| 4 | Mohammad Reza Akhbari | Iran | 174 |
| 5 | Mohammad Iranpourian | Iran | 165 |
| 6 | Masoud Ebrahimzadeh | Iran | 159 |
| 7 | Morteza Asadi | Iran | 142 |
| 8 | Mohammad Nosrati | Iran | 123 |
| 9 | Ehsan Haji Safi | Iran | 117 |
| 10 | Farzad Hatami | Iran | 113 |
| 11 | Ricardo Alves | Portugal | 94 |
