= 2023–24 Azadegan League =

32nd season of Azadegan League

Azadegan League
- Season: 2023–24
- Champions: Kheybar Khorramabad
- Promoted: Kheybar Khorramabad Chadormalou Ardakan
- Matches: 222
- Goals: 411 (1.85 per match)

The 2023–24 Azadegan League is the 33rd season of the Azadegan League and 23rd as the second highest division since its establishment in 1991. The season will start with 13 teams from the 2022–23 Azadegan League, two new teams relegated from the 2022–23 Persian Gulf Pro League: Mes Kerman and Naft Masjed Soleyman and three new teams promoted from the 2022–23 League 2: Manategh Naftkhiz Jonoub, Mes Sungun and Damash Gilan as champion, runner-up and third placed team respectively. Also Shahre Raz Shiraz bought Arman Gohar Sirjan and will participate as a new team in Azadegam League. After week 14, the contract between Khalij Fars Mahshahr and Shahin Bandar Ameri terminated and Shahin replaced Khalij Fars for the remaining matches.

== Teams ==
=== Stadia and locations ===
Locations of clubs

| Team | Location | Stadium | Capacity |
|---|---|---|---|
| Chadormalou Ardakan | Ardakan | Shahid Nassiri | 15,000 |
| Damash Gilan | Rasht | | |
| Darya Babol | Babol | Haft-e Tir | 6,000 |
| Esteghlal Mollasani | Ahvaz | Takhti | 10,000 |
| Naft Masjed Soleyman | Masjed Soleyman | Shahid Behnam Mohammadi Stadium | 8,000 |
| Fajr Sepasi Shiraz | Shiraz | Pars | 50,000 |
| Kheybar Khorramabad | Khorramabad | Takhti | 8,900 |
| Khooshe Talaei | Mashhad | Imam Reza Stadium | |
| Manategh Nafkhiz Jonoob | Gachsaran | | |
| Mes Kerman | Kerman | | |
| Mes Sungun Azerbaijan | Tabriz | | |
| Mes Shahr-e Babak | Sirjan | | |
| Pars Jonoubi Jam | Jam | Takhti | 15,000 |
| Saipa | Tehran | Shahid Dastgerdi | 8,250 |
| Shahr Raz Shiraz | Shiraz | | |
| Shahin Bandar Ameri | Ameri, Tangestan | | |
| Shahrdari Astara | Astara | | |
| Ario Eslamshahr | Eslamshahr | | |

=== Number of teams by region ===
| | Region | Number of teams | Teams |
|---|---|---|---|
| 1 | Khuzestan | 2 | Esteghlal Molasani, Naft Masjed Soleyman |
| 2 | Fars | 2 | Fajr Sepasi, Shahr Raz |
| 3 | Gilan | 2 | Damash, Shahrdari Astara |
| 4 | Kerman | 2 | Mes Kerman, Mes Shahr-e Babak |
| 5 | Bushehr | 2 | Pars Jonoubi, Shahin Bandar Ameri |
| 6 | Tehran | 2 | Saipa, Ario |
| 7 | East Azerbaijan | 1 | Mes Sungun |
| 8 | Kohgiluyeh and Boyer-Ahmad | 1 | Manategh Naftkhiz Jonoob |
| 9 | Lorestan | 1 | Kheybar |
| 10 | Markazi | 1 | Khooshe Talaei Saveh |
| 11 | Mazandaran | 1 | Darya Babol |
| 12 | Yazd | 1 | Chadormalou |

== League table ==
| Pos | Team | Pld | W | D | L | GF | GA | GD | Pts | Promotion or relegation |
|---|---|---|---|---|---|---|---|---|---|---|
| 1 | Kheybar Khorramabad (C, P) | 34 | 25 | 2 | 7 | 59 | 25 | +34 | 77 | Promotion to 2024–25 Persian Gulf Pro League |
| 2 | Chadormalou Ardakan (P) | 34 | 22 | 7 | 5 | 47 | 20 | +27 | 73 (Note: Chadormalou Ardakan finished ahead of Fajr Sepasi Shiraz on head-to-head points: Fajr Sepasi Shiraz 0–1 Chadormalou Ardakan, Chadormalou Ardakan 3–0 Fajr Sepasi Shiraz) | Promotion to 2024–25 Persian Gulf Pro League |
| 3 | Fajr Sepasi Shiraz | 34 | 22 | 7 | 5 | 50 | 17 | +33 | 73 | |
| 4 | Naft Masjed Soleyman | 34 | 16 | 13 | 5 | 47 | 29 | +18 | 61 | |
| 5 | Saipa | 34 | 13 | 11 | 10 | 35 | 28 | +7 | 50 | |
| 6 | Mes Kerman | 34 | 11 | 15 | 8 | 28 | 24 | +4 | 48 | |
| 7 | Ario Eslamshahr | 34 | 11 | 13 | 10 | 28 | 28 | 0 | 46 | |
| 8 | Mes Shahr Babak | 34 | 11 | 11 | 12 | 32 | 26 | +6 | 44 | |
| 9 | Pars Jonoubi Jam | 34 | 11 | 10 | 13 | 33 | 42 | −9 | 43 (Note: Pars Jonoubi Jam finished ahead of Naft va Gaz Gachsaran and Mes Sungun Azerbaijan on head-to-head points: Pars Jonoubi Jam 7, Naft va Gaz Gachsaran 5, Mes Sungun Azerbaijan 3) | |
| 10 | Naft va Gaz Gachsaran | 34 | 10 | 13 | 11 | 35 | 26 | +9 | 43 | |
| 11 | Mes Sungun Azerbaijan | 34 | 11 | 10 | 13 | 27 | 34 | −7 | 43 | |
| 12 | Esteghlal Molasani (Note: Esteghlal Molasani was deducted 3 points due to absence in the last week match in previous season.) | 34 | 10 | 13 | 11 | 26 | 33 | −7 | 40 | |
| 13 | Shahr Raz Shiraz | 34 | 8 | 12 | 14 | 25 | 34 | −9 | 36 | |
| 14 | Shahrdari Astara | 34 | 9 | 6 | 19 | 22 | 44 | −22 | 33 | |
| 15 | Damash Gilan | 34 | 7 | 11 | 16 | 32 | 45 | −13 | 32 | |
| 16 | Darya Babol (R) | 34 | 6 | 13 | 15 | 30 | 41 | −11 | 31 | Relegation to 2nd Division |
| 17 | Shahin Bandar Ameri (R) | 34 | 6 | 9 | 19 | 21 | 51 | −30 | 27 | Relegation to 2nd Division |
| 18 | Khooshe Talaee (R) | 34 | 6 | 6 | 22 | 17 | 47 | −30 | 24 | Relegation to 2nd Division |

Rules for classification: 1) Points; 2) Head-to-head points; 3) Head-to-head goal difference; 4) Head-to-head goals scored; 5) Goal difference; 6) Goals scored; 7) Play-off at neutral venue.
(Note: Head-to-head record is used only after all the matches between the teams in question have been played).
(C) Champions; (P) Promoted; (R) Relegated

== Results ==
| Home \ Away | ARI | CHA | DAM | DAR | ESM | FJR | SHA | KHE | KTS | MNJ | MES | MSB | MSV | MIS | PAR | SAP | SHR | SRS |
|---|---|---|---|---|---|---|---|---|---|---|---|---|---|---|---|---|---|---|
| Ario Bam Eslamshahr | — | 1–2 | 2–0 | 0–0 | 0–0 | 0–0 | 2–0 | 0–2 | 0–0 | 1–0 | 1–2 | 0–0 | 0–1 | 0–0 | 0–0 | 2–0 | 1–0 | 1–1 |
| Chadormalou Ardakan | 0–0 | — | 2–0 | 1–0 | 1–0 | 3–0 | 3–0 | 2–3 | 1–0 | 0–0 | 2–2 | 1–0 | 0–1 | 2–2 | 1–2 | 2–1 | 1–0 | 2–0 |
| Damash Gilan | 1–0 | 0–0 | — | 1–1 | 0–0 | 1–1 | 3–2 | 0–1 | 1–1 | 1–1 | 1–2 | 2–1 | 4–1 | 0–0 | 1–1 | 2–2 | 2–0 | 1–0 |
| Darya Babol | 1–2 | 0–3 | 2–0 | — | 2–0 | 2–2 | 2–0 | 1–1 | 1–0 | 1–4 | 1–1 | 1–1 | 0–1 | 1–2 | 3–1 | 0–2 | 2–0 | 0–0 |
| Esteghlal Mollasani | 1–0 | 0–0 | 2–1 | 2–2 | — | 0–3 (Note: Disciplinary) | 0–1 | 2–6 | 2–0 | 0–0 | 0–0 | 1–0 | 1–0 | 1–1 | 2–0 | 1–1 | 2–0 | 1–1 |
| Fajr Sepasi Shiraz | 1–0 | 0–1 | 2–0 | 1–0 | 2–0 | — | 2–0 | 3–0 | 2–0 | 1–0 | 0–0 | 3–1 | 3–0 | 1–0 | 2–0 | 1–1 | 2–1 | 1–0 |
| Shahin Bandar Ameri | 0–2 | 0–0 | 2–0 | 1–1 | 0–1 | 0–3 | — | 0–1 | 0–0 | 1–1 | 0–2 | 1–0 | 1–1 | 2–1 | 1–3 | 2–0 | 0–0 | 2–1 |
| Kheybar Khorramabad | 4–1 | 2–1 | 3–0 | 4–3 | 2–0 | 2–1 | 3–0 | — | 5–1 | 2–1 | 3–1 | 1–0 | 2–0 | 1–0 | 1–0 | 1–0 | 1–0 | 3–0 |
| Khooshe Talaei Saveh | 1–1 | 1–2 | 0–3 | 1–0 | | 0–2 | 1–1 | 0–1 | — | 0–0 | 2–1 | 1–0 | 2–0 | 0–3 | 2–0 | 0–3 | 2–3 | 0–1 |
| Manategh Nafkhiz Jonoob | 0–0 | 0–1 | | 0–0 | 1–1 | 0–1 | 2–0 | 1–0 | 1–0 | — | 0–0 | 1–0 | 0–0 | 1–1 | 4–0 | 2–3 | 3–0 | 0–1 |
| Mes Kerman | 2–0 | 0–1 | 0–0 | 0–0 | 1–0 | 0–1 | 1–0 | 0–2 | 1–0 | 1–2 | — | 0–0 | 1–0 | 2–1 | 0–0 | 0–0 | 2–0 | 4–2 |
| Mes Shahr Babak | 0–1 | 0–1 | 3–2 | 3–0 | 2–0 | 0–0 | 4–1 | 0–1 | 3–0 | 1–0 | 0–0 | — | 1–0 | 2–2 | 0–0 | 2–1 | 2–1 | 0–0 |
| Mes Sungun Varzaghan | 1–1 | 0–1 | 2–1 | 1–0 | 1–0 | 0–3 | 4–1 | 1–0 | 0–1 | 1–1 | 1–1 | 2–2 | — | 1–1 | 1–1 | 1–1 | 2–0 | 0–1 |
| Naft Masjed Soleyman | 1–2 | 3–2 | 2–2 | 2–1 | 2–2 | 1–0 | 1–1 | 2–0 | 2–0 | 3–1 | 2–0 | 2–0 | 1–0 | — | 0–0 | 0–0 | 2–1 | 2–1 |
| Pars Jonoubi Jam | 1–2 | 1–2 | 3–2 | 2–1 | 1–1 | 0–2 | 2–0 | 1–0 | 2–1 | 3–1 | 0–0 | 0–3 | 2–1 | 1–2 | — | 2–1 | 1–0 | 0–1 |
| Saipa | 3–0 | 1–2 | 1–0 | 1–0 | 2–0 | 2–1 | 1–1 | 1–0 | 1–0 | 2–1 | 0–0 | 0–0 | 0–1 | 0–1 | 1–0 | — | 0–1 | 2–1 |
| Shahrdari Astara | 3–2 | | 1–0 | 0–0 | 0–1 | 1–2 | 2–0 | 1–0 | 1–0 | 0–3 | 1–0 | 0–0 | 0–1 | 0–0 | 1–1 | 1–1 | — | 3–2 |
| Shahr Raz Shiraz | 0–2 | 0–1 | 1–0 | 1–1 | 0–0 | 0–1 | 3–0 | 1–1 | 1–0 | 0–0 | 1–1 | 0–0 | 0–0 | 1–2 | 2–2 | 0–0 | 1–0 | — |

Source: Soccerway
Legend: Blue = home team win; Yellow = draw; Red = away team win.

=== Positions by round ===
The table lists the positions of teams after each week of matches. In order to preserve chronological evolvements, any postponed matches are not included to the round at which they were originally scheduled, but added to the full round they were played immediately afterwards.

| Team ╲ Round | 1 | 2 | 3 | 4 | 5 | 6 | 7 | 8 | 9 | 10 | 11 | 12 | 13 | 14 | 15 | 16 | 17 | 18 | 19 | 20 | 21 | 22 | 23 | 24 | 25 | 26 | 27 | 28 | 29 | 30 | 31 | 32 | 33 | 34 |
|---|---|---|---|---|---|---|---|---|---|---|---|---|---|---|---|---|---|---|---|---|---|---|---|---|---|---|---|---|---|---|---|---|---|---|
| Ario Bam Eslamshahr | 3 | 5 | 4 | 5 | 8 | 8 | 10 | 11 | 12 | 13 | 14 | 14 | 14 | 12 | 8 | 10 | 12 | 12 | 9 | 9 | 9 | 8 | 6* | 6 | 6* | | | | | | | | | |
| Chadormalou Ardakan | 3 | 6 | 6 | 3 | 3 | 2 | 2 | 4 | 5 | 3 | 3 | 2 | 1 | 1 | 1 | 1 | 1 | 1 | 1 | 1 | 2 | 2 | 2 | 2 | 2 | | | | | | | | | |
| Damash Gilan | 10 | 15 | 15 | 17 | 17 | 18 | 16 | 17 | 17 | 18 | 17 | 17 | 16 | 17 | 17 | 17 | 17 | 16 | 16 | 17 | 17 | 18 | 17 | 18 | 16 | | | | | | | | | |
| Darya Babol | 11 | 13 | 13 | 14 | 16 | 17 | 18 | 18 | 15 | 15 | 16 | 16 | 17 | 16 | 16 | 16 | 16 | 17 | 17 | 18 | 18 | 17 | 18 | 16 | 17 | | | | | | | | | |
| Esteghlal Mollasani | 18 | 18 | 16 | 13 | 15 | 15 | 14 | 12 | 13 | 11 | 13 | 11 | 9 | 11 | 13 | 13 | 11 | 11 | 13 | 10 | 11 | 11 | 11 | 12 | 12 | | | | | | | | | |
| Fajr Sepasi Shiraz | 11 | 8 | 9 | 10 | 6 | 4 | 4 | 3 | 1 | 2 | 1 | 3 | 2 | 3 | 4 | 4 | 4 | 3 | 4 | 4 | 4 | 3 | 3 | 3 | 3 | | | | | | | | | |
| Shahin Bandar Ameri | 17 | 17 | 18 | 18 | 18 | 14 | 17 | 16 | 18 | 16 | 18 | 18 | 18 | 18 | 18 | 18 | 18 | 18 | 18 | 16 | 16 | 15 | 15 | 15 | 15 | | | | | | | | | |
| Kheybar Khorramabad | 11 | 10 | 11 | 9 | 5 | 3 | 3 | 1 | 2 | 1 | 2 | 1 | 3 | 2 | 2 | 2 | 2 | 2 | 2 | 2 | 1 | 1 | 1 | 1 | 1 | | | | | | | | | |
| Khooshe Talaei Saveh | 11 | 16 | 12 | 12 | 14 | 16 | 13 | 15 | 16 | 17 | 15 | 15 | 15 | 15 | 15 | 15 | 15 | 15 | 15 | 15 | 15 | 16 | 16 | 17 | 18 | | | | | | | | | |
| Manategh Nafkhiz Jonoob | 3 | 4 | 5 | 7 | 10 | 9 | 7 | 5 | 4 | 5 | 6 | 7 | 6 | 6 | 5 | 6 | 6 | 6 | 6 | 6 | 6 | 6 | 7* | 7 | 7* | | | | | | | | | |
| Mes Kerman | 2 | 9 | 10 | 11 | 12 | 13 | 15 | 14 | 11 | 12 | 9 | 8 | 8 | 10 | 10 | 11 | 9 | 8 | 8 | 7 | 7 | 7 | 8 | 9 | 9 | | | | | | | | | |
| Mes Shahr Babak | 11 | 13 | 17 | 15 | 11 | 11 | 11 | 10 | 10 | 10 | 12 | 10 | 13 | 12 | 12 | 9 | 10 | 10 | 12 | 13 | 12 | 12 | 12 | 11 | 11 | | | | | | | | | |
| Mes Sungun Varzaghan | 1 | 1 | 1 | 1 | 2 | 5 | 6 | 8 | 9 | 9 | 11 | 12 | 10 | 7 | 11 | 12 | 13 | 13 | 11 | 12 | 10 | 10 | 10 | 8 | 8 | | | | | | | | | |
| Naft Masjed Soleyman | 3 | 6 | 8 | 6 | 8 | 10 | 9 | 9 | 7 | 8 | 5 | 4 | 4 | 4 | 3 | 3 | 3 | 4 | 3 | 3 | 3 | 4 | 4 | 4 | 4 | | | | | | | | | |
| Pars Jonoubi Jam | 3 | 3 | 3 | 4 | 7 | 6 | 8 | 6 | 8 | 6 | 7 | 9 | 12 | 9 | 9 | 8 | 8 | 9 | 7 | 8 | 8 | 9 | 9 | 10 | 10 | | | | | | | | | |
| Saipa | 3 | 2 | 1 | 2 | 1 | 1 | 1 | 2 | 3 | 4 | 4 | 5 | 5 | 5 | 6 | 5 | 5 | 5 | 5 | 5 | 5 | 5 | 5 | 5 | 5 | | | | | | | | | |
| Shahrdari Astara | 11 | 12 | 13 | 15 | 13 | 12 | 12 | 13 | 14 | 13 | 10 | 13 | 11 | 14 | 14 | 14 | 14 | 14 | 14 | 14 | 14 | 14 | 14 | 14 | 14 | | | | | | | | | |
| Shahr Raz Shiraz | 9 | 11 | 7 | 8 | 4 | 7 | 5 | 7 | 6 | 7 | 8 | 6 | 7 | 8 | 7 | 7 | 7 | 7 | 10 | 11 | 13 | 13 | 13 | 13 | 13 | | | | | | | | | |

| Leader :2024–25 Persian Gulf Pro League |
| 2024–25 Persian Gulf Pro League |
| Relegation to 2024–25 League 2 |

Updated to match(es) played on 3 April 2024. Source: Iran Football League Organization

== See also ==
- 2023–24 Persian Gulf Pro League
- 2023–24 2nd Division
- 2023–24 3rd Division
- 2023–24 Hazfi Cup
- 2023 Iranian Super Cup
