= 2023–24 Hazfi Cup =

Iranian Football tournament season

Iranian Knockout Cup

Tournament details
- Country: Iran
- Dates: 19 November 2023 – 20 June 2024
- Teams: 86

Final positions
- Champions: Sepahan (5th title)
- Runners-up: Mes Rafsanjan

Tournament statistics
- Matches played: 68
- All statistics correct as of 5 November 2023.

The 2023–24 Hazfi Cup was the 37th season of the Iranian football knockout competition. The champion of this competition qualified to the Super Cup and the AFC Champions League Elite next season.

Persepolis were the defending champions, but were eliminated at the round of 16.

== Qualified teams ==
A total of 86 teams (out of a possible total of 96 eligible teams) participated. The teams were divided into four main groups.

- 16 teams of the Persian Gulf Pro League: entering at the Round of 32.
- 18 teams of the Azadegan League: entering at the third round.
- 28 teams from the 2nd Division: entering at the second round.
- 24 teams (out of a possible total of 34 (Note: Kish, Khoramshahr and Tehran have extra representatives) teams) from Provincial Leagues: entering from first round.

== Schedule ==
The schedule of the competition is as follows

Stage	Round	Draw date	Matches dates
First stage	Round 1	5 November 2023.	19–20 November 2023
First stage	Round 2	22 November 2023	5–6 December 2023
First stage	Round 3	11 December 2023	27–29 December
Second Stage	Round of 32	8 January 2024	7–9 February 2024
Second Stage	Round of 16	17 March 2024	25–26 April 2024
Second Stage	Quarter-finals	29 April 2024	16 May 2024
Second Stage	Semi-finals	29 April 2024	15 June 2024
Second Stage	Final	29 April 2024	20 June 2024

== First stage ==
=== First round ===
Number of teams per tier entering this round
Pro League (1)	1. division (2)	2. division (3)	Provincial Leagues (4)	Total
16 / 16	18 / 18	28 / 28	24 / 34	86 / 96

20 November 2023 1	Salavan Yordum Meshkin Shahr (4)	4–0	Lachin Center Jolfa (4)	Meshginshahr
14:00				Stadium: Takhti

19 November 2023 1	Sepanta Torbat Heydarieh	w/o	Shohadaye Chaharbagh Alborz	Torbat-e Heydarieh
14:00				Stadium: Azadi
Note: Shohadaye Chaharbagh Alborz withdrew.

20 November 2023 1	Kia Shahrood (4)	5–0	Kia Tarom (4)	Shahrud, Iran
14:00				Stadium: Takhti

19 November 2023 1	Avrin Khoy (4)	w/o	Academy Batis Tehran (4)	Khoy
14:30				Stadium: Chamran
Note: Academy Batis Tehran withdrew.

20 November 2023 1	Darya Babolsar (4)	3–0	Oghab Pardisan Qom (4)	Babolsar
14:15				Stadium: Shahid Alizadeh

20 November 2023 1	Shahrdari Dehgolan (4)	3–5	Ettehad Javan Hamedan (4)	Dehgolan
14:15				Stadium: Shahid Alizadeh

19 November 2023 1	Tam Kohgiluye (4)	4–1	Ettehad Sefin Kish (4)	Dehdasht
14:15				Stadium: Azadi

19 November 2023 1	Snag Ahan Bafgh (4)	3–0	Salamat Eslamabad Gharb (4)	Bafq
14:00				Stadium: Shohadaye Sang Ahan

20 November 2023 1	Sepahan Esfahak Tabas (4)	2–4	Talaeye Shiraz (4)	Tabas
14:00				Stadium: Azadi

20 November 2023 1	Abouzar Kangan (4)	w/o	Abuzar Farsan (4)	Kangan
14:30				Stadium: Shohadaye Varzeshkar
Note: Abuzar Farsan withdrew.

20 November 2023 1	Tara Foolad Chermahin Isfahan (4)	0–3 (awarded)	Mehregan Dareshahr (4)	Chermahin
14:00				Stadium: Takhti
Note: The match was originally won 1–0 by Tara Foolad. However, due to Tara Foolad's using an ineligible player, the match awarded 3–0 to Mehregan.

19 November 2023 1	Ra'd Mahalat (4)	0–3	Keshavarz Dezfoul (4)	Mahalat
14:00				Stadium: Takhti
Note: Keshavarz Dezfoul withdrew.

=== Second round ===
Number of teams per tier entering this round
Pro League (1)	1. division (2)	2. division (3)	Provincial Leagues (4)	Total
16 / 16	18 / 18	14 / 28	12 / 34	60 / 96

5 December 2023 2	Salavan Yordum Meshkin Shahr (4)	w/o	Tam Kohgiluye (4)	Meshginshahr
14:00				Stadium: Takhti
Note: Tam Kohgiluye withdrew.

6 December 2023 2	Espad Alvand Tehran (3)	1–0	YASA Tehran (3)	Tehran
14:00				Stadium: Be'sat

6 December 2023 2	Ayande Sazan Ardebil (3)	4–1	Darya Babolsar (4)	Ardabil
14:00				Stadium: Takhti

6 December 2023 2	Shohadaye Babolsar (3)	2–1	Kavir Moghava Tehran (3)	Babolsar
14:00				Stadium: Shahid Alizadeh

5 December 2023 2	Talaeye Shiraz (4)	1–4	Shenavarsazi Qeshm (3)	Shiraz
14:00				Stadium: Dastgheyb

6 December 2023 2	Ettehad Javan Hamedan (4)	0–0 (3–5 p)	KIA Tehran (3)	Hamadan
14:00				Stadium: Haj Babayi

6 December 2023 2	Keshavarz Dezfoul (4)	1–1 (2–4 p)	Setaregan Javan Tehran (3)	Dezful
14:00				Stadium: Shohadaye Shahrdari

5 December 2023 2	Kian Sam Babol (3)	w/o	Sang Ahan Bafgh (4)	Sari
14:00				Stadium: Shohada
Note: Sang Ahan Bafgh withdrew.

6 December 2023 2	Shahid Ghandi Yazd (3)	1–2	Nirooye Zamini (3)	Yazd
14:00				Stadium: Shahid Nasiri

Notes

- Bye to the third round: Abouzar Kangan (4), Avrin Khoy (4), Chooka Talesh (3), Kia Shahrood (4), Mehregan Dareshahr (4), Navad Urmia (3), Nika Pars Chaloos (3), Sepanta Torbat Heydarieh (4).

=== Third round ===
Number of teams per tier entering this round
Pro League (1)	1. division (2)	2. division (3)	Provincial Leagues (4)	Total
16 / 16	15 / 18	11 / 28	6 / 34	48 / 96

Damashian Rasht (2), Kheybar Khorramabad (2) and Shahrdari Astara (2) were banned and could not participate due to last season's absence.

28 December 2023 3	Shenavarsazi Qeshm (3)	w/o	Shohadaye Babolsar (3)	Qeshm
14:00				Stadium: Peyposht
Note: Shohadaye Babolsar withdrew.

28 December 2023 3	Khooshe Talaei (2)	1–1 (a.e.t.) (2–3 p)	Chooka Talesh (3)	Tehran
14:00				Stadium: Naft Tehransar

28 December 2023 3	Nika Pars Chaloos (3)	2–1	Kian Sam Babol (3)	Chalus
14:00				Stadium: Shohadaye Tajankala

28 December 2023 3	Nirooye Zamini (3)	1–0	Mes Shahr-e Babak (2)	Tehran
14:00				Stadium: Ghadir

28 December 2023 3	Naft va Gaz Gachsaran (2)	w/o	Avrin Khoy (4)	Gachsaran
14:30				Stadium: Shohadaye Naft
Note: Avrin Khoy withdrew.

28 December 2023 3	Esteghlal Mollasani (2)	w/o	Abouzar Kangan (4)	Takhti
14:00				Attendance: Ahvaz
Note: Abouzar Kangan withdrew.

27 December 2023 3	Setaregan Javan Tehran (3)	1–0	Naft MasjedSoleyman (2)	Tehran
14:00				Stadium: Marghoobkar

29 December 2023 3	Mes Sungun (2)	3–1	Kia Shahrood (4)	Tabriz
14:00				Stadium: Yadegar-e Emam Stadium

28 December 2023 3	Ario Bam Eslamshahr (2)	1–1 (a.e.t.) (3–2 p)	Chadormalu Ardakan (2)	Eslamshahr
14:00				Stadium: Imam Khomeini
Note: The host team has changed after the draw by requesting both teams.

28 December 2023 3	Pars Jonoubi Jam (2)	2–0	Espad Alvand Tehran (3)	Jam
14:30				Stadium: Takhti

28 December 2023 3	Navad Urmia (3)	1–2	Sepanta Torbat Heydarieh (4)	Urmia
14:00				Stadium: Shahid Bakeri

29 December 2023 3	Mes Kerman (2)	w/o	Darya Babol (2)	Kerman
14:30				Stadium: Imam Ali
Note: Darya Babol withdrew, and were also banned from the following season's Hazfi Cup.

27 December 2023 3	Saipa (2)	3–0	Ayande Sazan Ardebil (3)	Karaj
14:30	Saeid Karimi 43'; Pouria Bali 66'; Mohammadtaha Tabatabataei (P) 90+3'			Stadium: Enghelab

29 December 2023 3	Fajr Sepasi Shiraz (2)	0–0 (a.e.t.) (4–3 p)	Mehregan Dareshahr (4)	Shiraz
14:00				Stadium: Hafezieh Stadium
	Penalties
	Abbas Bouazar (penalty scored); Mohammad Azhir (penalty scored); Erfan Poor Afraz (penalty missed); Mohammad Ali Kazemi (penalty scored); Mohammad Hossein Golpour (penalty scored)		(penalty scored) Mehrdad Zarei; (penalty scored) Moein Aghayi; (penalty missed) Ramin Shakouri; (penalty scored) Arya Naghi Zadegan; (penalty missed) Mohammad Amin Mahdavi

27 December 2023 3	Shahre Raz Shiraz (2)	1–0	Salavan Yordum Meshkin Shahr (4)	Shiraz
14:00	Peyman Namvar 69'			Stadium: Hafezieh Stadium

27 December 2023 3	KIA Tehran (3)	3–1	Shahin Bandar Ameri (2)	Shahriar
14:00			Mahdi Khalaj 37'	Stadium: Shabahang

== Second stage ==
=== Bracket ===
Round of 32
Sanat Naft	1 (4)
Esteghlal Mollasani	1 (5)
Sepahan	3
Shams Azar	0
Gol Gohar	2
Nika Pars Chaloos	0
Nirooye Zamini	1 (2)
Fajr Sepasi Shiraz (2)	1 (3)
Chooka Talesh	0
Tractor	3
Zob Ahan	3
KIA FC	0
Sepanta Torbat Heydarieh	0
Mes Kerman	6
Foolad	0
Chadormalu Ardakan	1
Havadar	1
Esteghlal Khuzestan	0
Mes Sungun	3
Shenavarsazi Qeshm	1
Malavan	1
Shahr Raz Shiraz	0
Saipa	1
Pars Jonoubi Jam	0
Mes Rafsanjan	2
Esteghlal	0
Paykan	1
Setaregan Javan Tehran	0
Nassaji Mazandaran	0
Aluminium	1
Persepolis	3
Naft va Gaz Gachsaran	0

Round of 16
Esteghlal Mollasani	1
Sepahan	2
Fajr Sepasi Shiraz	0
Gol Gohar	3
Tractor	1 (3)
Zob Ahan	1 (1)
Mes Kerman	1 (3)
Chadormalu Ardakan	1 (5)
Havadar	3
Mes Sungun	1
Malavan	2
Saipa	1
Mes Rafsanjan	1 (5)
Paykan	1 (4)
Aluminium	4 (6)
Persepolis	4 (5)

Quarter-finals
Mes Rafsanjan	1
Tractor	0
Chadormalu Ardakan	0
Aluminium	1
Sepahan	1
Malavan	0
Gol Gohar	5
Havadar	0

Semi-Finals
Mes Rafsanjan	1 (4)
Aluminium	1 (2)
Sepahan	2
Gol Gohar	1

Final
Mes Rafsanjan	0
Sepahan	2

=== Round of 32 ===
Number of teams per tier entering this round
Pro League (1)	1. division (2)	2. division (3)	Provincial Leagues (4)	Total
16 / 16	9 / 18	6 / 28	1 / 34	32 / 96

8 February 2024 4	Nirooye Zamini (3)	1–1 (2–3 p)	Fajr Sepasi Shiraz (2)	Tehran
14:00				Stadium: Ghadir

9 February 2024 4	Malavan (1)	1–0	Shahr Raz Shiraz (2)	Bandar-e Anzali
15:00	Arman Akvan 27'			Stadium: Takhti

8 February 2024 4	Saipa (2)	1–0	Pars Jonoubi Jam (2)	Karaj
14:30	Saeid Karimi 18'			Stadium: Enghelab Stadium

8 February 2024 4	Sepanta Torbat Heydarieh (4)	0–6	Mes Kerman (2)	Torbat Heydarieh
14:00			Abolfazl Akkashe 25'; Mohammad Amin Kaviyani 38'; Mohammad Ali Safiya 45', 82'; Abolfazl Nazari 73'; Pouriya Gholami 75'	Stadium: Azadi

9 February 2024 4	Nassaji Mazandaran (1)	0–1	Aluminium (1)	Qaem Shahr
15:0			Ehsan Ghahari 61'	Stadium: Vatani Stadium

8 February 2024 4	Foolad (1)	0–1	Chadormalu Ardakan (2)	Ahvaz
16:00			Ali Taheran 90+8'	Stadium: Shohadaye Foolad

9 February 2024 4	Havadar (1)	1–0	Esteghlal Khuzestan (1)	Tehran
15:00	Amin Ghaseminejad 87'			Stadium: Pas Ghavamin

8 February 2024 4	Gol Gohar (1)	2–0 (a.e.t.)	Nika Pars Chaloos (3)	Sirjan
15:00	Ahmad Reza Zenderouh 94'; Roberto Tores 115'			Stadium: Shahid Soleymani

4 March 2024 4	Sepahan (1)	3–0	Shams Azar (1)	Isfahan
17:30	Reza Asadi 24'; Omid Noorafkan60'; Reza Shekari71'			Stadium: Naghsh-e Jahan Stadium

7 February 2024 4	Paykan (1)	1–0	Setaregan Javan Tehran (3)	Tehran
15:00	Danyal Jahanbakhsh 45'			Stadium: Pas Ghavamin

4 March 2024 4	Mes Rafsanjan (1)	2–0	Esteghlal (1)	Rafsanjan
17:00	Mohammad Mehdi Mohebi25'; Muntadher Mohammed66'			Stadium: Shohadaye Mes Rafsanjan

8 February 2024 4	Zob Ahan (1)	3–0	KIA FC (3)	Isfahan
15:00	Mohammad Ghoreyshi; Omid Latifi; Ahmad Shari'at Zadeh			Stadium: Foolad Shahr Stadium

4 March 2024 4	Persepolis (1)	3–0	Naft va Gaz Gachsaran (2)	Tehran
20:00	Mehdi Torabi 38'; Danial Esmaeilifar 47'; Issa Alekasir 55'			Stadium: Azadi Stadium

8 February 2024 4	Chooka Talesh (3)	0–3	Tractor (1)
Note: Chooka Talesh withdrew.

8 February 2024 4	Mes Sungun (2)	3–1 (a.e.t.)	Shenavarsazi Qeshm (3)	Tabriz
16:00	Mohammad Taher Amini 63'; Farzan Dana 107'; Milad Souri 119'		Nasrollah Derafshi 73'	Stadium: Yadegar-e Emam Stadium

8 February 2024 4	Sanat Naft (1)	1–1 (a.e.t.) (4–5 p)	Esteghlal Mollasani (2)	Abadan
15:00	Taleb Reykani 94'		Ali Fateh 101'	Stadium: Takhti

=== Round of 16 ===
Number of teams per tier entering this round
Pro League (1)	1. division (2)	2. division (3)	Provincial Leagues (4)	Total
10 / 16	6 / 18	0 / 28	0 / 34	16 / 96

26 April 2024 5	Esteghlal Mollasani (2)	1–2	Sepahan (1)	Ahvaz
19:30				Stadium: Ghadir Stadium

26 April 2024 5	Fajr Sepasi Shiraz (2)	0–3	Gol Gohar (1)	Shiraz
18:00				Stadium: Hafezieh Stadium

26 April 2024 5	Tractor (1)	1–1 (a.e.t.) (3–1 p)	Zob Ahan (1)	Tabriz
18:30				Stadium: Yadegar-e Emam Stadium

26 April 2024 5	Mes Kerman (2)	1–1 (a.e.t.) (3–5 p)	Chadormalu F.C. (2)	Kerman
17:45				Stadium: Imam Ali Stadium

26 April 2024 5	Havadar (1)	3–1	Mes Sungun(2)	Tehran
18:15				Stadium: PAS Ghavamin

26 April 2024 5	Malavan (1)	2–1	Saipa (2)	Bandar-e Anzali
18:30				Stadium: Takhti Stadium

25 April 2024 5	Mes Rafsanjan (1)	1–1 (a.e.t.) (5–4 p)	Paykan (1)	Rafsanjan
17:45				Stadium: Shohadaye Mes

26 April 2024 5	Aluminium (1)	4–4 (a.e.t.) (6–5 p)	Persepolis (1)	Arak
18:15				Stadium: Imam Khomeini Stadium

=== Quarter-finals ===
Number of teams per tier entering this round
Pro League (1)	1. division (2)	2. division (3)	Provincial Leagues (4)	Total
7 / 16	1 / 18	0 / 28	0 / 34	8 / 96

16 May 2024 6	Tractor (1)	0–1 (a.e.t.)	Mes Rafsanjan (1)	Tabriz
19:00			Mohammad Mehdi Mohebi 91'	Stadium: Yadegar-e Emam Stadium

16 May 2024 6	Chadormalu (2)	0–1 (a.e.t.)	Aluminium (1)	Yazd
18:15			Reza Jabireh 119'	Stadium: Shahid Nasiri

16 May 2024 6	Gol Gohar (1)	5–0	Havadar (1)	Shahid Soleymani
19:00	Ahmad Reza Zendehrouh 8'; Saeid Saharkhizan 71'; Masoud Zaer Kazemeini 75', 95+5'; Mehdi Mamizade 90+7'			Stadium: Shahid Soleymani

16 May 2024 6	Sepahan (1)	1–0	Malavan (1)	Isfahan
19:30	Farshad Ahmadzadeh 39'			Stadium: Naghsh-e Jahan Stadium

=== Semi-finals ===
Number of teams per tier entering this round
Pro League (1)	1. division (2)	2. division (3)	Provincial Leagues (4)	Total
4 / 16	0 / 18	0 / 28	0 / 34	4 / 96

15 June 2024 7	Sepahan (1)	2–1	Gol Gohar (1)

15 June 2024 7	Aluminium (1)	1–1 (a.e.t.) (2–4 p)	Mes Rafsanjan (1)

=== Final ===
Number of teams per tier entering this round
Pro League (1)	1. division (2)	2. division (3)	Provincial Leagues (4)	Total
2 / 16	0 / 18	0 / 28	0 / 34	2 / 96

20 June 2024 8	Mes Rafsanjan	0–2	Sepahan	Tehran
			Moghanlou 8', 23' (pen.)	Stadium: Azadi Stadium; Attendance: 15,000; Referee: Bijan Heydari

== See also ==
- 2023–24 Persian Gulf Pro League
- 2023–24 Azadegan League
- 2023–24 2nd Division
- 2023–24 3rd Division
- 2023 Iranian Super Cup
