= 2023–24 League 2 (Iran) =

Iran Football's 2nd Division
- Season: 2023–24

The 2023–24 season of Iran Football's 2nd Division was the 23rd under 2nd Division since its establishment (current format) in 2001. The season featured 22 teams from the 2nd Division 2022–23, two new team relegated from the 2022–23 Azadegan League: Shahrdari Hamedan, Chooka Talesh, and four new teams promoted from the 3rd Division 2022–23: Samit Tehran, Kavir Moghava Tehran, Shenavarsazi Jam Vatan Qeshm and Sorkhpooshan Pakdasht.
These changes has been applied before the season:

| Team | Replaced team |
|---|---|
| Panik Talesh | Nika Pars Chaloos |
| Shahid Oraki Eslamshahr | KIA Tehran |
| Iman Sabz Shiraz | Ayande Sazan Ardebil |
| Sorkhpooshan Pakdasht | Petroshimi Shazand |
| Samit Tehran | YASA Tehran |
| Ario Bam Eslamshahr | Setaregan Javan Tehran |

== Teams ==
=== Stadia and locations ===
Locations of clubs in 2023–24 Iran Football's 2nd Division

=== Number of teams by region ===
| | Region | Number of teams | Teams |
|---|---|---|---|
| 1 | Tehran | 6 | Bahman Tehran, Espad Alvand, Kavir Moghava, KIA, YASA, Nirooye Zamini |
| 2 | Mazandaran | 4 | Shohadaye Sari (Kian Sam), Nika Pars Chaloos, Shahrdari Noshahr, Shohadaye Babolsar |
| 3 | Hormozgan | 3 | Foolad Hormozgan, Shahrdari Bandar Abbas, Shenavar Sazi |
| 4 | Gilan | 2 | Chooka Talesh, Sepidrood Rasht |
| 5 | Hamedan | 2 | Shahrdari Hamedan, PAS Hamedan |
| 6 | Khuzestan | 2 | Foolad Novin, Shahrdari Mahshahr |
| 7 | Alborz | 1 | Shohadaye Razakan |
| 8 | Ardabil | 1 | Ayande Sazan |
| 9 | Bushehr | 1 | Shahin Bushehr |
| 10 | Kerman | 1 | Shahrdari Bam |
| 11 | Kermanshah | 1 | Besat |
| 12 | Markazi | 1 | Petroshimi Shazand |
| 13 | North Khorasan | 1 | Atrak Bojnourd |
| 14 | West Azerbaijan | 1 | Navad Urmia |
| 15 | Yazd | 1 | Shahid Ghandi Yazd |

== Seeding ==
The teams were seeded according to their performance in the 2022-23 2nd Division, Azadegan League and 3rd Division. The relegated teams from 2022–23 Azadegan League were placed in Pot 1. The remaining teams from 2022–23 2nd Division were placed in Pot 2 to Pot 5 according to their final league position. And the promoted teams from 2022–23 3rd Division were placed in Pot 8.

| Pot Number | Pot Name | Teams | Comments |
|---|---|---|---|
| Pot 1 | Relegated Teams from Azadegan League and 2nd Divions's Play-off loser | Shahrdari Hamedan (16); Chooka Talesh (17); Foolad Novin Ahvaz (PL) | The 18th-Placed team in Azadegan League were relegated directly to 3rd Division, thus Pot 1 has one fewer team than usual. |
| Pot 2 | Temas ranked 3rd and 4th in 2nd Division | Foolad Hormozgan (3); Shohadaye Razakan Karaj (3); Sepidrood Rasht (4); Shahrdari Noshahr (4) | After identifying the group of Foolad Hormozgan, Shahrdari Bandar Abbas will be placed in the other group automatically. |
| Pot 3 | Temas ranked 5th and 6th in 2nd Division | Pas Hamedan (5); Shahrdari Mahshahr (5); Shahid Oraki Eslamshahr (Replaced by Kia Tehran) (6); Shahid Ghandi Yazd (6) | |
| Pot 4 | Temas ranked 7th and 8th in 2nd Division | Besat Kermanshah (7); Shahrdari Bam (7); Panik Talesh (Replaced by Nika Pars Chaloos) (8); Ario Bam Eslamshahr (8) | |
| Pot 5 | Temas ranked 9th and 10th in 2nd Division | Espad Tehran (9); Shohadaye Babolsar (9); Navad Urmia (10); Nirooye Zamini Tehran (10) | |
| Pot 6 | Temas ranked 11th and 12th and the winner of Relegation Play-off in 2nd Division | Atrak Bojnoord (11); Shahrdari Bandar Abbas (11); Iman Sabz Shiraz (Replaced by Ayande Sazan Ardebil) (12); Shahin Taban Bushehr (12); Kian Sam Babol (13-PW) | After identifying the group of Foolad Hormozgan, Shahrdari Bandar Abbas will be placed in the other group automatically. Due to direct relegation of the 18th-placed team from Azadegan League to 3rd division, the Play-off match between the 13th-placed team was held and the winner, remained in 2nd Division, thus Pot 6 has one more team than usual. |
| Pot 7 | Temas promoted from 3rd Division | Samit Tehran (1); Kavir Moghava Tehran (1); Shenavar Sazi Qeshm (1); Sorkhpooshan Pakdasht (PW) | |

For the provinces which have three or more teams (Tehran, Mazandaran and Hormozgan), a protection rule was applied. So from three teams of Hormozgan, two teams should be placed in one group and the third team can not be placed in the same group.
Due to licence transfers of teams, the new location of each team (after confirmation) is considered in the draw.

== League table ==
=== Group A ===
| Pos | Team | Pld | W | D | L | GF | GA | GD | Pts | Promotion or relegation |
|---|---|---|---|---|---|---|---|---|---|---|
| 1 | Nirooye Zamini Tehran (Q) | 26 | 15 | 8 | 3 | 48 | 22 | +26 | 53 | 2024–25 Azadegan League & Final Match |
| 2 | Shahrdari Mahshahr (P) | 26 | 14 | 9 | 3 | 34 | 14 | +20 | 51 | Promotion Play-off |
| 3 | Setaregan Javan Tehran | 26 | 13 | 10 | 3 | 26 | 15 | +11 | 49 | |
| 4 | Sepidrood Rasht | 26 | 9 | 9 | 8 | 25 | 25 | 0 | 36 | |
| 5 | Pas Hamedan | 26 | 9 | 8 | 9 | 22 | 22 | 0 | 35 (Note: Pas Hamedan is ahead of Chooka Talesh on head-to-head goal difference: Pas Hamedan +1, Chooka Talesh -1.) | |
| 6 | Chooka Talesh | 26 | 9 | 8 | 9 | 31 | 28 | +3 | 35 | |
| 7 | Shohadaye Babolsar | 26 | 8 | 9 | 9 | 25 | 29 | −4 | 33 | |
| 8 | Ayande Sazan Ardabil | 26 | 8 | 7 | 11 | 21 | 25 | −4 | 31 | |
| 9 | Foolad Novin Ahvaz | 26 | 6 | 12 | 8 | 24 | 20 | +4 | 30 (Note: Foolad Novin Ahvaz, Shohadaye Razakan Alborz, YASA Tehran and Shahrdari Bandar Abbas are ranked based on head-to-head points: Foolad Novin Ahvaz 9, Shohadaye Razakan Alborz 9, YASA Tehran 8, Shahrdari Bandar Abbas 4.) | |
| 10 | Shohadaye Razakan Alborz | 26 | 5 | 15 | 6 | 17 | 17 | 0 | 30 | |
| 11 | YASA Tehran | 26 | 6 | 12 | 8 | 20 | 30 | −10 | 30 | |
| 12 | Sh. Bandar Abbas | 26 | 7 | 9 | 10 | 30 | 31 | −1 | 30 | |
| 13 | Shahrdari Bam (R) | 26 | 4 | 8 | 14 | 19 | 39 | −20 | 20 | Relegation to 2024–25 3rd Division |
| 14 | Shohadaye Sari (Kian Sam) (R) | 26 | 2 | 10 | 14 | 17 | 42 | −25 | 16 | Relegation to 2024–25 3rd Division |

Updated to match(es) played on 14 May 2024. Source:
Rules for classification: 1) Points; 2) Head-to-head points; 3) Head-to-head goal difference; 4) Head-to-head goals scored; 5) Goal difference; 6) Goals scored; 7) Play-off at neutral venue.
(Note: Head-to-head record is used only after all the matches between the teams in question have been played).

=== Group B ===
| Pos | Team | Pld | W | D | L | GF | GA | GD | Pts | Promotion or relegation |
|---|---|---|---|---|---|---|---|---|---|---|
| 1 | Kavir Moghava Tehran (Q) | 25 | 15 | 7 | 3 | 32 | 14 | +18 | 52 | 2024-25 Azadegan League & Final Match |
| 2 | Shahrdari Noshahr (P) | 25 | 14 | 9 | 2 | 32 | 12 | +20 | 51 | Promotion Play-off |
| 3 | Shenavar Sazi Qeshm | 25 | 13 | 10 | 2 | 34 | 18 | +16 | 49 | |
| 4 | Nika Pars Chaloos | 25 | 13 | 5 | 7 | 32 | 23 | +9 | 44 | |
| 5 | Be'sat Kermanshah | 25 | 10 | 8 | 7 | 27 | 20 | +7 | 38 | |
| 6 | Foolad Hormozgan | 25 | 8 | 11 | 6 | 25 | 19 | +6 | 35 | |
| 7 | Shahrdari Hamedan | 25 | 9 | 7 | 9 | 30 | 29 | +1 | 34 | |
| 8 | Navad Urmia | 25 | 9 | 6 | 10 | 24 | 28 | −4 | 33 | |
| 9 | Shahid Ghandi Yazd | 25 | 8 | 8 | 9 | 26 | 26 | 0 | 32 | |
| 10 | Spad Alvand Tehran | 25 | 7 | 7 | 11 | 20 | 28 | −8 | 28 (Note: Spad Tehran are ahead of Petroshimi Shazand based on head-to-head points: Spad Tehran 4, Pettoshimi Shazand 1.) | |
| 11 | Petroshimi Shazand | 25 | 7 | 7 | 11 | 23 | 31 | −8 | 28 | |
| 12 | KIA Tehran | 25 | 7 | 2 | 16 | 30 | 44 | −14 | 23 | |
| 13 | Atrak Bojnourd (R) | 25 | 1 | 7 | 17 | 14 | 38 | −24 | 10 | Relegation to 2024–25 3rd Division |
| 14 | Shahin Bushehr (E) | 13 | 0 | 2 | 11 | 8 | 27 | −19 | 2 | Relegation to 2024–25 4th Division |

Updated to match(es) played on 14 May 2024. Source:
Rules for classification: 1) Points; 2) Head-to-head points; 3) Head-to-head goal difference; 4) Head-to-head goals scored; 5) Goal difference; 6) Goals scored; 7) Play-off at neutral venue.
(Note: Head-to-head record is used only after all the matches between the teams in question have been played).

== Results ==
=== Group A ===
| Home \ Away | NZT | SDB | SJT | CHT | KSB | PAH | SRR | FOL | ASA | SAM | APT | SHR | SHM | SBA |
|---|---|---|---|---|---|---|---|---|---|---|---|---|---|---|
| Nirooye Zamini Tehran | — | 4–0 | 2–2 | 2–1 | 2–1 | 5–1 | 0–1 | 2–1 | 1–1 | 3–0 | 6–0 | 1–0 | 2–1 | 1–1 |
| Shohadaye Babolsar | 0–0 | — | 1–2 | 0–0 | 1–1 | 2–1 | 2–1 | 1–0 | 2–0 | 1–1 | 3–1 | 1–1 | 0–0 | 0–1 |
| Setaregan Javan Tehran | 1–0 | 2–0 | — | 1–0 | 2–1 | 0–0 | 1–1 | 0–0 | 0–0 | 2–0 | 1–0 | 2–1 | 1–1 | 1–0 |
| Chooka Talesh | 2–3 | 1–2 | 3–0 | — | 2–0 | 3–1 | 1–0 | 2–2 | 2–1 | 1–1 | 3–2 | 0–0 | 2–1 | 0–0 |
| Shohadaye Sari (Kian Sam) | 1–1 | 2–1 | 0–1 | 0–0 | — | 0–0 | 1–1 | 0–3 (Note: by Disciplinary Committee) | 1–1 | 2–2 | 1–2 | 0–0 | 0–1 | 1–3 |
| Pas Hamedan | 1–1 | 1–0 | 0–0 | 3–0 | 3–0 | — | 2–1 | 2–1 | 1–0 | 0–1 | 1–1 | 0–0 | 1–1 | 2–1 |
| Sepidrood Rasht | 1–2 | 4–1 | 0–0 | 2–1 | 3–2 | 1–0 | — | 0–0 | 1–0 | 0–1 | 0–1 | 0–0 | 1–2 | 1–1 |
| Foolad Novin Ahvaz | 0–0 | 0–1 | 0–1 | 1–1 | 3–1 | 0–0 | 0–1 | — | 3–1 | 0–0 | 2–0 | 2–1 | 1–1 | 2–0 |
| Ayande Sazan Ardabil | 1–1 | 1–3 | 0–1 | 2–0 | 2–0 | 1–0 | 0–1 | 2–1 | — | 1–0 | 1–0 | 1–1 | 0–1 | 1–2 |
| YASA Tehran | 0–1 | 3–2 | 0–0 | 0–0 | 0–1 | 1–0 | 0–1 | 1–1 | 1–0 | — | 0–0 | 0–0 | 0–1 | 4–2 |
| Shahrdari Bam | 0–2 | 0–0 | 1–3 | 1–4 | 3–0 | 0–1 | 4–0 | 0–0 | 0–1 | 1–1 | — | 0–0 | 0–2 | 2–2 |
| Shohadaye Razakan Alborz | 2–3 | 0–0 | 0–0 | 1–0 | 0–0 | 0–1 | 2–2 | 0–0 | 0–1 | 1–1 | 2–0 | — | 1–0 | 2–1 |
| Shahrdari Mahshahr | 2–1 | 1–0 | 1–0 | 2–1 | 0–0 | 1–0 | 1–1 | 0–0 | 1–1 | 8–1 | 3–0 | 0–0 | — | 1–0 |
| Sh. Bandar Abbas | 1–2 | 1–1 | 3–2 | 0–1 | 5–1 | 1–0 | 0–0 | 2–1 | 1–1 | 1–1 | 0–0 | 1–2 | 0–1 | — |

Updated to match(es) played on 13 May 2024. Source:
Legend: Blue = home team win; Yellow = draw; Red = away team win.

=== Group B ===
| Home \ Away | KIA | BSK | KMT | ATB | SGY | STB | NVU | NPC | FOH | SPA | SHH | PTS | SHN | SSQ |
|---|---|---|---|---|---|---|---|---|---|---|---|---|---|---|
| KIA Tehran | — | 1–0 | 1–2 | 3–2 | 1–2 | 3–0 (Note: Shahin Taban Bushehr did not show up at the league and the match result declared 3-0 win for KIA Tehran.) | 2–1 | 5–2 | 2–2 | 1–1 | 1–3 | 1–0 | 0–1 | 1–2 |
| Be'sat Kermanshah | 1–0 | — | 1–3 | 1–0 | 3–1 | – (Note: Shahin Taban Bushehr has been eliminated from the league.) | 3–0 | 0–0 | 2–0 | 2–0 | 1–0 | 1–1 | 1–1 | 0–0 |
| Kavir Moghava Tehran | 1–0 | 0–0 | — | 1–0 | 1–1 | – | 3–0 | 0–1 | 0–0 | 1–0 | 2–3 | 2–1 | 1–1 | 1–0 |
| Atrak Bojnourd | 1–2 | 0–0 | 0–0 | — | 1–2 | – | 0–1 | 0–2 | 2–2 | 0–0 | 0–1 | 0–1 | 0–1 | 0–3 |
| Shahid Ghandi Yazd | 4–1 | 1–2 | 1–2 | 1–0 | — | 1–1 | 1–2 | 1–0 | 2–0 | 0–1 | 0–1 | 1–0 | 0–1 | 1–1 |
| Shahin Taban Bushehr | – (Note: Shahin Taban Bushehr did not show up at the field.) | 0–3 | 0–0 | 1–3 | – | — | – | – | – | – | – | 3–4 | 1–2 | 0–1 |
| Navad Urmia | 3–0 | 1–1 | 2–0 | 2–0 | 1–2 | 2–1 | — | 2–0 | 1–1 | 1–0 | 0–2 | 0–2 | 1–1 | 0–0 |
| Nika Pars Chaloos | 3–1 | 3–1 | 0–1 | 2–1 | 1–1 | 1–0 | 1–1 | — | 2–0 | 3–0 | 2–1 | 1–0 | 1–0 | 1–2 |
| Foolad Hormozgan | 3–1 | 2–0 | 0–1 | 4–1 | 0–0 | 1–0 | 1–0 | 1–0 | — | 3–0 (Note: Spad Tehran did not show up at the field.) | 2–0 | 1–1 | 0–0 | 0–1 |
| Spad Alvand Tehran | 1–0 | 0–1 | 1–2 | 1–1 | 1–0 | 3–0 | 0–0 | 0–1 | 1–1 | — | 2–1 | 1–1 | 0–4 | 1–1 |
| Shahrdari Hamedan | 3–2 | 3–2 | 0–3 | 0–0 | 1–1 | 3–1 | 3–1 | 1–1 | 0–0 | 1–2 | — | 0–1 | 1–1 | 0–0 |
| Petroshimi Shazand | 3–0 | 2–1 | 0–3 (Note: Petroshimi Shazand did not show up at the field.) | 1–1 | 1–1 | – | 0–1 | 0–1 | 0–0 | 0–3 (Note: The match between Petroshimi Shazand and Spad Alvand Tehran was stopped at 60th minute and the Disciplinary Committee found Petroshimi Shazand guilty. The result before stoppage was "Petroshimi Shazand 0-2 Spad Alvand".) | 1–0 | — | 0–0 | 0–1 |
| Shahrdari Noshahr | 2–1 | 1–0 | 1–1 | 3–1 | 2–0 | – | 1–0 | 1–1 | 0–0 | 1–0 | 1–0 | 2–0 | — | 1–1 |
| Shenavar Sazi Qeshm | 1–0 | 0–0 | 0–1 | 3–0 | 1–1 | – | 3–1 | 3–2 | 2–1 | 2–1 | 2–2 | 3–3 | 1–0 | — |

Updated to match(es) played on 14 May 2024. Source:
Legend: Blue = home team win; Yellow = draw; Red = away team win.

== Promotion Play-Off ==
| Team 1 | Agg. | Team 2 | 1st leg | 2nd leg |
|---|---|---|---|---|
| Shahrdari Mahshahr | 1-1 (1-2 p) | Shahrdari Noshahr | 1-0 | 1-0 |

=== Leg 1 ===
29 May 2024
18:30

| Shahrdari Mahshahr | 1-0 | Shahrdari Noshahr |

Shohadaye Naft, Omidiyeh

=== Leg 2 ===
5 June 2024
18:30

| Shahrdari Noshahr | 1-0 (a.e.t.) | Shahrdari Mahshahr |
Penalties
| | 2-1 |

Shohada, Noshahr

Source=

Shahrdari Noshahr promoted to 2024-25 Azadegan league

== 2nd Division Final ==
| Team 1 | Score | Team 2 |
|---|---|---|
| Kavir Moghava Tehran | 0–0 (2–3 p) | Nirooye Zamini Tehran |

=== Single Match ===
26 May 2024
17:00

| Kavir Moghava Tehran | 0-0 (a.e.t.) | Nirooye Zamini Tehran |
Penalties
| | 2-3 |

Shahid Dastgerdi Stadium, Tehran

Nirooye Zamini Tehran won the league and got the Champion Trophy.

== See also ==
- 2023–24 Persian Gulf Pro League
- 2023–24 Azadegan League
- 2023–24 3rd Division
- 2023–24 Hazfi Cup
- 2023 Iranian Super Cup
