= 2024–25 Azadegan League =

34th season of Azadegan League

Azadegan League
- Season: 2024–25
- Champions: Fajr Sepasi (2nd title)
- Promoted: Fajr Sepasi; Paykan
- Relegated: Shahrdari Astara; Shahr Raz; Naft Masjed Soleyman
- Matches: 306
- Goals: 538 (1.76 per match)
- Biggest home win: Shahr Raz 7–0 Shahrdari Astara
- Biggest away win: Damash 1–4 Paykan (30 November 2024); Shahrdari Astara 0–3 Naft & Gaz Gachsaran (21 December 2024); Pars Jonoubi Jam 0–3 Nirooye Zamini (30 January 2025); Shahrdari Nowshahr 0–3 Pars Jonoubi Jam (19 February 2025); Shahrdari Astara 1–4 Mes Shahr-e Babak (11 March 2025); Shahrdari Astara 0–3 Pars Jonoubi Jam (29 April 2025); Shahrdari Astara 0–3 Ario Eslamshahr (12 May 2025)
- Highest scoring: Palayesh Naft Bandar Abbas 7–1 Shahrdari Astara (19 February 2025)
- Longest winning run: Fajr Sepasi (5 matches)
- Longest unbeaten run: Ario Eslamshahr (15 matches)
- Longest winless run: Shahrdari Astara (34 matches)
- Longest losing run: Shahrdari Astara (11 matches)
- All statistics correct as of 20 May 2025.

The 2024–25 Azadegan League is the 34th season of the Azadegan League and 24th as the second highest division since its establishment in 1991. The season will start with 13 teams from the 2023–24 Azadegan League, two new teams relegated from the 2023–24 Persian Gulf Pro League and three new teams promoted from the 2023–24 League 2.

== Teams ==
=== Stadia and locations ===
Locations of clubs

Team	Location	Stadium	Capacity
Ario Eslamshahr	Eslamshahr	Emam Khomeini Eslamshahr	7,000
Be'sat Kermanshah	Kermanshah	Azadi Stadium	7,000
Damash Gilan	Rasht	Azodi	17,276
Fajr Sepasi Shiraz	Shiraz	Pars	50,000
Mes Kerman	Kerman	Shahid Bahonar	12,430
Mes Shahr-e Babak	Shahr-e Babak	Shohadaye Mes Shahr-e Babak	15,000
Mes Sungun	Tabriz	Shahid Poursharifi Arena	6,000
Naft va Gaz Gachsaran	Dogonbadan	Shohadaye Naft Gachsaran Stadium	7,500
Palayesh Naft	Bandar Abbas	Fajr Stadium	4,000
Naft Masjed Soleyman	Masjed Soleyman	Shahid Behnam Mohammadi Stadium	8,000
Nirooye Zamini	Tehran	Shohadaye Nezaja Stadium	1,000
Pars Jonoubi Jam	Jam	Takhti	15,000
Paykan	Tehran	Shahr-e Qods Stadium	8,000
Saipa	Tehran	Shahid Dastgerdi	8,250
Sanat Naft Abadan	Abadan	Takhti Stadium	10,000
Shahrdari Astara	Astara	Vahdat Astara Stadium	500
Shahrdari Noshahr	Nowshahr	Shahrdari Stadium	4,000
Shahr Raz Shiraz	Shiraz	Hafezieh Stadium	14,000

== League table ==
Pos	Team	Pld	W	D	L	GF	GA	GD	Pts	Relegation
1	Fajr Sepasi Shiraz (C, P)	34	19	9	6	39	17	+22	66	Promotion to 2025–26 Persian Gulf Pro League
2	Paykan (P)	34	16	13	5	43	21	+22	61	Promotion to 2025–26 Persian Gulf Pro League
3	Saipa	34	17	9	8	34	23	+11	60	
4	Sanat Naft Abadan	34	15	14	5	28	15	+13	59	
5	Ario Eslamshahr	34	14	16	4	33	18	+15	58	
6	Pars Jonoubi Jam	34	14	11	9	40	30	+10	53	
7	Mes Shahr-e Babak	34	12	13	9	34	26	+8	49	
8	Shahrdari Nowshahr	34	12	10	12	37	32	+5	46	
9	Palayesh Naft	34	10	12	12	32	30	+2	42	
10	Mes Kerman	34	8	18	8	23	21	+2	42	
11	Be'sat Kermanshah	34	9	15	10	26	25	+1	42	
12	Naft Gachsaran	34	10	12	12	27	28	−1	42	
13	Nirooye Zamini	34	7	16	11	20	23	−3	37	
14	Mes Sungun	34	7	15	12	34	41	−7	36	
15	Damash Gilan	34	6	16	12	20	39	−19	34	
16	Naft MIS (R)	34	6	15	13	29	36	−7	33	Relegation to 2nd Division
17	Shahr Raz Shiraz (Note: Shahr Raz Shiraz was deducted one point.) (R)	34	7	12	15	27	34	−7	32	Relegation to 2nd Division
18	Shahrdari Astara (R)	34	0	8	26	14	81	−67	8	Relegation to 2nd Division

Source: Soccerway
Rules for classification: 1) Points; 2) Head-to-head points; 3) Head-to-head goal difference; 4) Head-to-head goals scored; 5) Goal difference; 6) Goals scored; 7) Fair-play points.
(Note: Head-to-head record is used only after all the matches between the teams in question have been played).
(C) Champions; (P) Promoted; (R) Relegated

== Results ==
Home \ Away	ARI	BEA	DAM	FAJ	KER	MSB	SUN	NAG	NMS	NZT	PAL	PJJ	PAY	SAI	SNA	SHA	SHN	SHR
Ario Eslamshahr	—	2–0	1–0	1–0	0–1	1–0	1–0	1–1	3–1	1–0	2–0	1–1	0–2	0–1	0–0	2–0	0–0	0–0
Be'sat Kermanshah	0–0	—	0–0	0–1	1–0	0–1	4–2	3–0	1–0	1–0	1–1	1–1	0–0	0–0	2–0	0–0	1–0	0–0
Damash Gilan	0–0	0–0	—	0–1	0–0	1–0	1–0	1–1	0–1	0–0	1–1	1–1	1–4	0–0	0–0	3–0	18 May	2–1
Fajr Sepasi Shiraz	1–0	1–0	4–0	—	0–0	0–0	0–0	1–0	2–0	0–0	1–0	2–2	0–2	0–0	0–1	3–0	4–1	1–0
Mes Kerman	0–0	2–2	0–0	1–2	—	0–0	2–0	2–1	1–1	0–0	0–0	0–1	1–0	0–1	0–0	2–0	0–0	2–0
Mes Shahr-e Babak	2–2	1–1	2–0	0–0	0–2	—	2–2	2–0	1–1	18 May	1–3	0–0	1–1	0–1	0–1	2–0	1–1	1–0
Mes Sungun	3–3	1–1	4–0	0–2	0–0	1–1	—	2–0	2–2	0–0	0–2	1–0	0–2	2–1	1–0	1–1	2–2	2–2
Naft Gachsaran	0–1	0–0	1–1	0–1	0–0	0–1	1–0	—	1–0	0–0	18 May	1–1	0–0	1–1	2–0	3–1	1–0	1–1
Naft MIS	1–1	18 May	0–1	2–1	0–0	0–1	0–0	0–2	—	0–0	1–1	2–2	1–2	0–0	0–0	6–0	0–0	1–0
Nirooye Zamini	0–1	1–1	1–1	2–3	0–0	0–0	0–2	0–1	2–0	—	0–1	0–1	1–1	0–1	0–0	2–0	1–0	1–0
Palayesh Naft	0–1	2–1	0–0	1–1	1–1	0–1	2–0	1–0	0–1	1–1	—	0–0	0–0	0–1	0–1	7–1	0–1	2–0
Pars Jonoubi Jam	2–2	1–0	2–1	0–1	2–1	0–2	18 May	1–0	2–1	0–3	2–0	—	1–1	0–1	0–0	4–0	2–1	2–1
Paykan	0–0	0–1	3–0	1–1	18 May	1–1	1–0	1–1	2–1	1–0	1–2	2–0	—	3–0	1–1	3–0	0–0	1–1
Saipa	1–1	1–1	2–1	18 May	2–1	1–2	1–2	1–0	2–0	0–1	2–0	2–1	0–1	—	0–0	1–1	1–0	1–0
Sanat Naft Abadan	1–1	1–0	0–0	1–0	3–0	2–0	2–2	1–0	0–0	1–2	0–0	1–0	2–0	2–1	—	1–0	3–1	2–1
Shahrdari Astara	0–3	0–2	2–3	0–1	0–0	1–4	1–1	0–3	3–3	0–0	0–1	0–3	0–1	2–3	0–0	—	1–2	0–2
Shahrdari Noshahr	0–0	2–0	5–0	0–2	2–3	1–0	0–0	1–2	2–0	1–1	3–0	0–3	3–1	1–0	0–1	2–0	—	2–0
Shahr Raz Shiraz	0–1	2–1	0–0	1–2	0–0	1–0	2–1	0–0	1–1	0–0	1–1	1–0	0–2	0–3	1–0	18 May	1–1	—

Updated to match(es) played on 22 April 2025. Source: Soccerway
Legend: Blue = home team win; Yellow = draw; Red = away team win.
For upcoming matches, an "a" indicates there is an article about the rivalry between the two participants.

== See also ==
- 2024–25 Persian Gulf Pro League
- 2024–25 2nd Division
- 2024–25 3rd Division
- 2024–25 Hazfi Cup
- 2024 Iranian Super Cup
