= 2022–23 Azadegan League =

31st season of Azadegan League

Azadegan League
- Season: 2022–23
- Champions: Shams Azar Qazvin
- Promoted: Shams Azar Qazvin; Esteghlal Khuzestan
- Relegated: Shahrdari Hamedan; Chooka Talesh; Omid Vahdat

The 2022–23 Azadegan League was the 32nd season of the Azadegan League and 22nd as the second highest division since its establishment in 1991. The season started on 11 October 2022 with 13 teams from the 2021–22 Azadegan League, two new teams relegated from the 2021–22 Persian Gulf Pro League (Shahr Khodro and Fajr Sepasi) and three new teams promoted from the 2021–22 League 2 (Chooka, Shahin Bandar Ameri and Van Pars Naghshe Jahan as champion, runner-up and third-placed team, respectively). These changes had taken effect before the season:

Team	Replaced team
Shahin Bandar Ameri	Khalij Fars Mahshahr
Qashqai Shiraz	Chadormalou Ardakan

== Teams ==
=== Stadia and locations ===
Locations of clubs

Team	Location	Stadium	Capacity
Arman Gohar Sirjan	Sirjan	Takhti Stadium	5,000
Chadormalou Ardakan	Ardakan		
Chooka Talesh	Talesh		
Esteghlal Mollasani	Ahvaz	Takhti	38,900
Esteghlal Khuzestan	Ahvaz	Takhti	38,900
Fajr Sepasi Shiraz	Shiraz	Pars	50,000
Kheybar Khorramabad	Khorramabad	Takhti	8,900
Khooshe Talaei Saveh	Saveh	Shahid Chamran	3,000
Mes Shahr-e Babak	Sirjan		
Pars Jonoubi Jam	Jam	Takhti	15,000
Rayka Babol	Babol	Haft-e Tir	6,000
Saipa	Tehran	Shahid Dastgerdi	
Khalij Fars Mahshahr	Bandar-e Mahshahr		
Omid Vahdat	Mashhad	Samen	35,000
Shams Azar Qazvin	Qazvin		
Shahrdari Astara	Astara	Vahdat	
Shahrdari Hamedan	Hamedan		
Van Pars Nasghshe Jahan	Isfahan		

=== Number of teams by region ===
	Region	Number of teams	Teams
1	Khuzestan	3	Esteghlal Khuzestan, Esteghlal Molasani, Khalij Fars Mahshahr
2	Gilan	2	Chooka, Shahrdari Astara
3	Kerman	2	Arman Gohar Sirjan, Mes Shahr-e Babak
4	Bushehr	1	Pars Jonoubi
5	Fars	1	Fajr Sepasi
6	Hamadan	1	Shahrdari Hamedan
7	Isfahan	1	Van Pars
8	Khorasan Razavi	1	Omid Vahdat
9	Lorestan	1	Kheybar
10	Markazi	1	Khooshe Talaei Saveh
11	Mazandaran	1	Rayka Babol
12	Qazvin	1	Shams Azar
13	Tehran	1	Saipa
14	Yazd	1	Chadormalou

== League table ==
Pos	Team	Pld	W	D	L	GF	GA	GD	Pts	Promotion or relegation
1	Shams Azar Qazvin (C, P)	32	21	7	4	67	24	+43	70	Promotion to 2023–24 Persian Gulf Pro League
2	Esteghlal Khuzestan (P)	32	14	15	3	47	21	+26	57	Promotion to 2023–24 Persian Gulf Pro League
3	Saipa	32	15	10	7	30	22	+8	55	
4	Fajr Sepasi Shiraz	32	14	11	7	40	25	+15	53	
5	Kheybar Khorramabad	32	12	16	4	32	16	+16	52	
6	Mes Shahr Babak	32	10	15	7	24	20	+4	45 (Note: Mes Shahr Babak, Chadormalou Ardakan and Van Pars Naghsh-e-Jahan are ranked by head-to-head points: Van Pars Naghsh-e-Jahan 0–0 Mes Shahr Babak, Chadormalou Ardakan 2-0 Van Pars Naghsh-e-Jahan, Mes Shahr Babak2-0 Chadormalou Ardakan, Mes Shahr Babak 2–0 Van Pars Naghsh-e-Jahan, Van Pars Naghsh-e-Jahan 0-2 Chadormalou Ardakan, Chadormalou Ardakan 1-1 Mes Shahr Babak. Mes Shahr Babak 9 points, Chadormalou Ardakan 8 points, Van Pars Naghsh-e-Jahan 1 point.)	
7	Chadormalou Ardakan	32	11	12	9	32	31	+1	45	
8	Van Pars Naghsh-e-Jahan	32	12	9	11	32	29	+3	45	
9	Pars Jonoubi Jam	32	11	10	11	26	31	−5	43	
10	Darya Babol	32	8	14	10	26	25	+1	38	
11	Esteghlal Mollasani	32	7	16	9	27	42	−15	37	
12	Khooshe Talaei Saveh	32	8	11	13	26	33	−7	35	
13	Arman Gohar	32	8	9	15	29	45	−16	33	
14	Shahrdari Astara	32	5	15	12	14	27	−13	30	
15	Khalij Fars Mahshahr	32	7	8	17	21	42	−21	29	
16	Shahrdari Hamedan (R)	32	6	10	16	16	30	−14	28	Relegation to 2nd Division
17	Chooka Talesh (R)	32	4	10	18	29	55	−26	22	Relegation to 2nd Division
18	Omid Vahdat (R)	0	0	0	0	0	0	0	0	Relegation to 2023–24 3rd Division 2nd Stage

Updated to match(es) played on 23 May 2023. Source: IranLeague, Dsport
Rules for classification: 1) Points; 2) Head-to-head points; 3) Head-to-head goal difference; 4) Head-to-head goals scored; 5) Goal difference; 6) Goals scored; 7) Play-off at neutral venue.
(Note: Head-to-head record is used only after all the matches between the teams in question have been played).

== Results ==
Home \ Away	ARM	CHA	CHT	DAR	ESK	ESM	FJR	KFM	KHE	KTS	MSB	OVM	PAR	SAP	SHR	SHH	SAQ	VPN
Arman Gohar	—	1–2	2–1	0–0	0–2	2–0	1–1	1–1	1–1	1–3	2–3		3–2	2–1	1–0	1–0	1–2	1–1
Chadormalou Ardakan	1–1	—	3–3	0–0	2–2	0–1	2–1	0–1	1–1	4–2	1–1		0–2	0–0	1–0	1–1	0–2	2–0
Chooka Talesh	2–0	1–2	—	1–3	1–0	1–2	1–2	0–0	1–1	2–0	0–1	~~3-0~~	0–0	0–0	3–0	2–2	0–3	1–2
Darya Babol	0–0	0–1	0–0	—	0–1	4–1	3–0	1–0	0–0	1–1	3–1		0–0	1–0	2–0	0–0	1–2	1–1
Esteghlal Khuzestan	5–0	0–0	6–0	1–0	—	1–1	0–0	2–0	0–0	2–0	0–0		3–1	0–0	1–0	0–0	2–1	2–0
Esteghlal Mollasani	1–1	1–0	3–3	2–0	3–3	—	1–1	1–1	2–1	1–1	0–0		0–0	0–0	0–0	1–1	0–0	1–1
Fajr Sepasi Shiraz	2–1	2–0	3–0	4–1	1–1	1–2	—	3–0	1–1	1–2	1–1	~~11-0~~	3–1	1–0	0–0	1–0	1–0	1–0
Khalij Fars Mahshahr	2–1	0–1	4–2	2–1	1–0	0–2	0–4	—	0–3	0–0	1–0		1–2	0–1	1–1	1–0	0–0	0–1
Kheybar Khorramabad	2–0	0–0	2–0	2–1	1–1	4–0	1–0	3–1	—	0–0	0–0		0–0	0–0	0–0	0–0	3–1	0–1
Khooshe Talaei Saveh	0–1	1–1	1–0	0–1	0–2	4–0	1–1	1–0	1–1	—	0–0	~~1-0~~	2–0	0–1	2–0	0–0	0–3	0–1
Mes Shahr Babak	1–0	2–0	2–1	0–0	1–1	3–0	1–0	1–0	0–1	1–1	—		0–0	0–0	0–0	1–0	1–1	2–0
Omid Vahdat	~~0-7~~			~~0-6~~		~~0-3~~		~~0-5~~			~~0-3~~	—						
Pars Jonoubi Jam	0–1	0–1	2–1	1–0	1–2	2–1	0–0	0–0	0–0	1–0	2–1		—	1–1	3–0	1–0	0–1	2–1
Saipa	2–1	1–0	0–0	2–0	2–2	4–0	0–1	3–1	0–1	1–0	1–0		3–1	—	1–1	1–0	2–1	1–0
Shahrdari Astara	2–0	0–2	1–1	0–0	0–0	1–0	0–0	2–2	0–1	0–0	0–0		1–0	0–1	—	3–0	0–0	1–0
Shahrdari Hamedan	1–0	0–1	3–0	0–0	0–1	0–0	1–2	1–0	2–0	0–2	1–0	~~7-0~~	0–1	0–1	0–0	—	1–4	1–0
Shams Azar Qazvin	3–1	3–1	4–1	1–1	2–1	0–0	3–1	2–1	2–1	4–0	3–0		5–0	4–0	3–1	2–1	—	3–0
Van Pars Naghsh-e-Jahan	1–1	0–2	1–0	1–0	3–3	2–0	0–0	2–0	0–1	2–1	0–0		0–0	4–0	2–0	3–0	2–2	—

Updated to match(es) played on 23 May 2023. Source: Soccerway
Legend: Blue = home team win; Yellow = draw; Red = away team win.

== See also ==
- 2022–23 Persian Gulf Pro League
- 2022–23 2nd Division
- 2022–23 3rd Division
- 2022–23 Hazfi Cup
- 2022 Iranian Super Cup
