= 2021–22 Azadegan League =

31st season of Azadegan League

Azadegan League
- Season: 2021–22
- Champions: Malavan
- Promoted: Malavan; Mes Kerman
- Relegated: Vista Toorbin Tehran; Shahin Bushehr; Machine Sazi

The 2021–22 Azadegan League was the 31st season of the Azadegan League and 21st as the second highest division since its establishment in 1991. The season was to start on 11 October 2021 with 13 teams from the 2020–21 Azadegan League, two new teams relegated from the 2020–21 Persian Gulf Pro League: Saipa and Machine Sazi and three new teams promoted from the 2020–21 League 2: Mes Shahr-e Babak, Shahrdari Hamedan and Vista Toorbin Tehran as champion, runner-up and third placed team, respectively.

== Teams ==
=== Stadia and locations ===
Locations of clubs

Team	Location	Stadium	Capacity
Arman Gohar Sirjan	Sirjan	Takhti Stadium	5,000
Esteghlal Mollasani	Ahvaz	Takhti	38,900
Esteghlal Khuzestan	Ahvaz	Takhti	38,900
Kheybar Khorramabad	Khorramabad	Takhti	8,900
Khooshe Talaei Saveh	Saveh	Shahid Chamran	3,000
Machine Sazi	Tabriz	Yadegar-e Emam	
Malavan	Bandar-e Anzali	Takhti Anzali	8,000
Mes Kerman	Kerman	Shahid Bahonar	15,430
Mes Shahr-e Babak	Sirjan		
Pars Jonoubi Jam	Jam	Takhti	
Qashqai	Shiraz	Pars	50,000
Rayka Babol	Babol	Haft-e Tir	6,000
Saipa	Tehran	Shahid Dastgerdi	
Shahin Bushehr	Bushehr	Shahid Mahdavi	
Shams Azar Qazvin	Qazvin		
Shahrdari Astara	Astara	Vahdat	
Shahrdari Hamedan	Hamedan		
Vista Toorbin	Tehran		

=== Number of teams by region ===
	Region	Number of teams	Teams
1	Kerman	3	Arman Gohar Sirjan, Mes Kerman, Mes Shahr-e Babak
2	Bushehr	2	Pars Jonoubi, Shahin
3	Gilan	2	Malavan, Shahrdari Astara
4	Khuzestan	2	Esteghlal Khuzestan, Esteghlal Molasani
5	Tehran	2	Saipa, Vista Toorbin
6	East Azerbaijan	1	Machine Sazi
7	Fars	1	Qashqai
8	Hamadan	1	Shahrdari Hamedan
9	Lorestan	1	Kheybar
10	Markazi	1	Khooshe Talaei Saveh
11	Mazandaran	1	Rayka Babol
12	Qazvin	1	Shams Azar

== League table ==
Pos	Team	Pld	W	D	L	GF	GA	GD	Pts	Promotion or relegation
1	Malavan (C, P)	34	20	11	3	40	15	+25	71	Promotion to 2022–23 Persian Gulf Pro League
2	Mes Kerman (P)	34	19	13	2	40	10	+30	70	Promotion to 2022–23 Persian Gulf Pro League
3	Arman Gohar	34	17	10	7	41	26	+15	61	
4	Kheybar Khorramabad	34	16	11	7	47	29	+18	59	
5	Pars Jonoubi Jam	34	13	13	8	37	36	+1	52	
6	Khooshe Talaei Saveh	34	12	14	8	48	39	+9	50	
7	Mes Shahr Babak	34	10	16	8	30	23	+7	46	
8	Esteghlal Mollasani	34	9	19	6	31	27	+4	46	
9	Shams Azar Qazvin	34	11	11	12	37	35	+2	44	
10	Sh. Hamedan	34	9	16	9	27	24	+3	43	
11	Shahrdari Astara	34	10	12	12	26	29	−3	42	
12	Qashqai	34	11	9	14	29	33	−4	42	
13	Esteghlal Khuzestan	34	10	10	14	37	34	+3	40	
14	Saipa	34	8	16	10	33	35	−2	40	
15	Rayka Babol	34	8	14	12	32	36	−4	38	
16	Vista Toorbin Tehran (R)	34	8	13	13	26	33	−7	37	Relegation to 2nd Division
17	Shahin Bushehr (R)	34	2	9	23	14	55	−41	15	Relegation to 2nd Division
18	Machine Sazi (R)	34	0	9	25	28	84	−56	9	Relegation to 2nd Division

Updated to match(es) played on 7 June 2022. Source: IranLeague, Dsport
Rules for classification: 1) Points; 2) Head-to-head points; 3) Head-to-head goal difference; 4) Head-to-head goals scored; 5) Goal difference; 6) Goals scored; 7) Play-off at neutral venue.
(Note: Head-to-head record is used only after all the matches between the teams in question have been played).
(C) Champions; (P) Promoted; (R) Relegated

== Results ==
Home \ Away	ARM	ESK	ESM	KHE	KTS	MES	MLV	MSB	MST	PAR	QSH	RYK	SAP	SAQ	SHA	SHH	SHR	VIS
Arman Gohar	—	1–0	0–0	2–1	0–1	0–0	1–1	1–0	5–1	2–1	1–0	1–0	2–1	2–1	1–0	0–0	3–1	2–0
Esteghlal Khuzestan	0–3	—	2–2	0–0	0–0	1–2	0–0	0–0	3–0	0–1	2–0	0–0	1–2	1–1	3–0	1–0	2–1	4–2
Esteghlal Mollasani	3–0	0–1	—	1–0	0–1	0–0	0–3	1–1	6–1	2–1	0–0	2–2	2–1	0–0	1–0	0–0	0–0	0–0
Kheybar Khorramabad	0–2	2–1	3–1	—	2–2	0–2	1–1	1–1	3–2	1–2	0–0	2–0	2–1	1–0	3–0	1–0	1–0	3–1
Khooshe Talaei Saveh	1–1	2–2	0–1	1–1	—	1–1	2–1	2–1	6–1	2–2	3–2	3–2	0–0	0–1	5–1	0–0	0–1	1–0
Mes Kerman	0–0	1–0	1–1	0–0	4–0	—	0–0	1–0	1–1	1–1	1–0	2–0	2–0	2–0	3–0	3–0	1–0	1–0
Malavan	2–0	1–0	1–2	0–0	2–1	1–1	—	1–0	3–2	2–1	1–0	1–1	2–0	1–0	3–0	1–0	2–0	1–0
Mes Shahr Babak	1–1	3–0	1–0	1–1	0–1	0–0	2–3	—	1–0	3–0	1–1	1–0	1–0	0–0	2–1	1–0	1–1	0–0
Machine Sazi	2–2	1–2	2–2	0–3	1–3	1–2	0–2	1–1	—	1–1	0–1	1–1	3–3	2–2	1–2	0–4	1–2	0–0
Pars Jonoubi Jam	1–0	1–0	1–1	1–4	0–0	1–0	1–0	1–1	2–1	—	3–1	1–1	0–0	1–0	1–1	1–0	3–0	1–0
Qashqai	2–1	1–0	3–0	0–1	1–1	0–1	0–1	1–0	0–1	1–2	—	1–0	1–0	0–3	0–0	0–0	1–1	2–0
Rayka Babol	1–0	1–2	1–1	1–2	1–1	0–0	0–0	1–0	2–0	5–1	2–0	—	1–0	1–1	0–0	1–2	2–1	1–1
Saipa	1–1	1–1	0–0	2–1	1–1	2–1	0–0	0–2	4–0	0–0	3–1	3–2	—	1–1	0–0	2–1	0–0	2–1
Shams Azar Qazvin	1–3	1–0	1–1	3–3	2–1	0–3	0–0	0–1	1–0	2–1	1–2	2–0	2–0	—	2–0	1–2	3–1	0–1
Shahin Bushehr	0–1	0–7	0–1	0–2	2–3	0–1	0–1	0–0	2–0	2–2	1–2	0–0	2–2	0–2	—	0–1	0–1	0–1
Sh. Hamedan	0–2	1–0	0–0	0–0	1–1	0–1	0–0	1–1	2–1	0–0	0–0	3–0	1–1	2–2	1–0	—	1–1	2–0
Shahrdari Astara	0–0	2–0	0–0	1–0	1–0	0–0	0–1	1–1	3–0	1–0	2–1	0–1	0–0	0–0	2–0	2–2	—	0–1
Vista Toorbin Tehran	3–0	1–1	0–0	0–2	3–2	0–1	0–1	1–1	4–1	1–1	1–1	1–1	0–0	2–1	0–0	0–0	1–0	—

Updated to match(es) played on 7 June 2022. Source: Soccerway
Legend: Blue = home team win; Yellow = draw; Red = away team win.

=== Positions by round ===
Team ╲ Round	1	2	3	4	5	6	7	8	9	10	11	12	13	14	15	16	17	18	19	20	21	22	23	24	25	26	27	28	29	30	31	32	33	34
Malavan	4	6	2	4	3	1	1	1	1	1	1	1	1	1	1	1	1	1	1	1	1	1	1	1	1	1	1	2	1	2	2	2	1	1
Mes Kerman	3	2	3	5	7	8	6	5	6	5	3	2	2	2	2	3	3	2	2	2	2	2	2	2	2	2	2	1	2	1	1	1	2	2
Arman Gohar	15	10	12	6	5	6	2	4	3	3	2	4	6	5	4	4	4	4	4	3	3	3	3	4	3	3	3	3	3	3	3	3	3	3
Kheybar Khorramabad	7	1	1	1	4	4	5	3	4	8	6	5	4	3	3	2	2	3	3	4	4	4	4	3	4	4	4	4	4	4	4	4	4	4
Pars Jonoubi Jam	16	17	17	17	17	15	15	14	14	15	15	14	9	9	8	6	7	6	5	5	5	5	5	5	5	5	5	5	6	5	5	5	5	5
Khooshe Talaei Saveh	6	8	4	7	9	9	10	11	9	7	8	7	5	6	6	7	6	7	9	7	6	7	9	8	9	9	9	7	5	6	6	6	6	6
Mes Shahr Babak	2	7	13	13	10	5	9	6	7	6	7	8	8	7	7	8	8	8	7	9	9	9	8	9	8	8	6	8	8	7	7	8	7	7
Esteghlal Mollasani	8	12	9	12	14	14	14	15	16	16	16	16	16	16	16	14	13	14	15	14	15	15	15	15	15	15	15	15	15	13	11	9	9	8
Shams Azar Qazvin	17	15	16	15	15	16	16	16	15	14	12	12	13	14	14	15	14	16	14	16	14	14	14	14	14	13	13	9	10	11	12	13	11	9
Sh. Hamedan	1	4	7	3	2	3	4	7	8	9	9	9	10	10	10	10	11	11	12	12	11	8	10	10	10	10	10	11	9	10	10	7	8	10
Shahrdari Astara	13	9	5	8	6	7	8	9	10	10	10	11	12	11	11	12	10	10	6	6	7	6	6	7	7	7	8	10	12	9	8	10	10	11
Esteghlal Khuzestan	10	11	14	14	13	13	7	8	5	4	4	3	3	4	5	5	5	5	8	8	10	11	7	6	6	6	7	6	7	8	9	11	12	12
Saipa	11	13	10	10	8	12	13	12	11	13	14	15	15	12	12	11	12	12	10	10	8	10	11	11	11	11	12	12	14	14	14	14	15	13
Qashqai	5	3	6	2	1	2	3	2	2	2	5	6	7	8	9	9	9	9	11	11	12	13	13	12	13	14	11	13	11	12	13	12	13	14
Rayka Babol	9	5	8	9	11	10	11	13	13	12	11	13	14	15	15	16	16	15	16	15	16	16	16	16	16	16	16	16	16	16	16	16	14	15
Vista Toorbin Tehran	14	14	11	11	12	11	12	10	12	11	13	10	11	13	13	13	15	13	13	13	13	12	12	13	12	12	14	14	13	15	15	15	16	16
Shahin Bushehr	12	16	15	16	16	17	17	17	17	17	17	17	17	17	17	17	17	17	17	17	17	17	18	17	18	18	17	18	17	17	17	17	17	17
Machine Sazi	18	18	18	18	18	18	18	18	18	18	18	18	18	18	18	18	18	18	18	18	18	18	17	18	17	17	18	17	18	18	18	18	18	18

Leader : Promotion to 2022–23 Persian Gulf Pro League
Promotion to 2022–23 Persian Gulf Pro League
Relegation to 2nd Division

Updated to match(es) played on 7 June 2022. Source: Soccerway

== See also ==
- 2021–22 Persian Gulf Pro League
- 2021–22 2nd Division
- 2021–22 3rd Division
- 2021-22 Hazfi Cup
- 2021 Iranian Super Cup
