= 2023–24 Persian Gulf Pro League =

23rd season of Persian Gulf Pro League

Persian Gulf Pro League
- Season: 2023–24
- Dates: August 9, 2023 – June 1, 2024
- Champions: Persepolis; 9th Pro League title 16th Iranian title
- Relegated: Paykan Tehran; Sanat Naft Abadan
- Matches: 240
- Goals: 522 (2.18 per match)
- Top goalscorer: Shahriyar Moghanlou (16 Goals)
- Biggest home win: Malavan 4–0 Foolad (23 August 2023) Esteghlal 4-0 Nassaji (19 December 2023)
- Biggest away win: Havadar 0–5 Sepahan (19 December 2023) Havadar 0–5 Nassaji (28 May 2024)
- Highest scoring: Persepolis 4–3 Esteghlal Khouzestan (24 May 2024)
- Longest winning run: Sepahan (5 matches)
- Longest unbeaten run: Esteghlal (25 matches)
- Longest winless run: Esteghlal Khuzestan (13 matches)
- Longest losing run: Esteghlal Khuzestan (6 matches)
- Highest attendance: 80,000; Tractor – Persepolis (16 August 2023); Tractor – Sepahan (3 April 2024)
- Lowest attendance: 0 (spectator ban); 35 matches
- Total attendance: 2,209,000
- Average attendance: 10,766 (matches with spectator bans not included)

The 2023–24 Persian Gulf Pro League (formerly known as Iran Pro League) was the 41st season of Iran's Football League and 23rd as Persian Gulf Pro League since its establishment in 2001.

== Teams ==
=== Promotion and relegation (pre-season) ===
A total of sixteen teams contest the league, including fourteen sides from the 2022–23 season and two promoted from the 2022–23 Azadegan League. This includes the two top teams from the Azadegan League.

Promoted from 2022–23 Azadegan League	Relegated to 2023–24 Azadegan League
Shams Azar (promoted for the first time in their history); Esteghlal Khuzestan (promoted after a four season absence)	Mes Kerman (relegated after a single season in top flight); Naft Masjed Soleyman (relegated after five seasons in top flight)

=== Stadiums and locations ===
Locations of the 2023–24 Persian Gulf Pro League teams
Location of Tehran teams in 2023–24 Persian Gulf Pro League teams

Team	Location	Stadium	Capacity
Aluminium Arak	Arak	Imam Khomeini	15,000
Esteghlal	Tehran	Azadi	78,116
Esteghlal Khuzestan	Ahvaz	Takhti	10,000
Foolad	Ahvaz	Foolad Arena	30,655
Gol Gohar Sirjan	Sirjan	Shahid Qasem Soleimani	9,000
Havadar	Tehran	Dastgerdi	8,250
Malavan	Bandar-e Anzali	Sirous Ghayeghran	9,000
Mes Rafsanjan	Rafsanjan	Shohadaye Mes 1 Shohadaye Mes 2	10,000; 3,800
Nassaji Mazandaran	Qaem Shahr	Vatani	15,000
Paykan	Tehran	Dastgerdi	8,250
Persepolis	Tehran	Azadi	78,116
Sanat Naft	Abadan	Takhti Abadan	10,000
Sepahan	Isfahan	Naghsh-e-Jahan	75,000
Shams Azar	Qazvin	Sardar Azadegan	15,000
Tractor	Tabriz	Yadegar-e Emam	66,833
Zob Ahan	Fooladshahr	Fooladshahr	20,000

=== Number of teams by Province ===
Province	Number of teams	Teams
Tehran	4	Persepolis, Esteghlal, Paykan, Havadar
Khuzestan	3	Foolad, Sanat Naft, Esteghlal Khuzestan
Kerman	2	Gol Gohar, Mes Rafsanjan
Isfahan	2	Sepahan, Zob Ahan
East Azarbaijan	1	Tractor
Qazvin	1	Shams Azar
Markazi	1	Aluminium Arak
Mazandaran	1	Nassaji
Gilan	1	Malavan

=== Personnel and kits ===
Note: Flags indicate national team as has been defined under FIFA eligibility rules. Players may hold more than one non-FIFA nationality.

Team	Manager	Captain	Kit manufacturer	Main kit sponsor	Other kit sponsor(s)
Aluminium Arak	(Iran) Mojtaba Hosseini	(Iran) Milad Fakhreddini	Sinasport	IRALCO	
Esteghlal	(Iran) Javad Nekounam	(Iran) Hossein Hosseini	Yousef Jameh	Rightel	Taavon Insurance ^{1}, Meraj Airlines^{2}
Esteghlal Khuzestan	(Iran) Sirous Pourmousavi	(Iran) Mohammad Tayyebi	Start	INSIG	BMI^{1}
Foolad	(Iran) Abdollah Veisi	(Iran) Ayoub Vali	Merooj	KSC	
Gol Gohar	(Greece) Marinos Ouzounidis	(Iran) Mehran Golzari	Yousef Jameh	Gol Gohar	
Havadar	(Iran) Masoud Shojaei	(Iran) Dariush Shojaeian	Darik	HiWEB	
Malavan	(Iran) Mehdi Tartar	(Iran) Hamed Noormohammadi	Darik	VITA	
Mes Rafsanjan	(Iran) Moharram Navidkia	(Iran) Mohsen Azarbad	Yousef Jameh	NICICO	
Nassaji	(Iran) Saket Elhami	(Iran) Mehrdad Abdi	Merooj	Varesh Airlines	
Paykan	(Iran) Reza Enayati	(Iran) Ebrahim Salehi	Alabaft	Haima 7X	Iran Khodro^{1}
Persepolis	(Brazil) Osmar Loss	(Iran) Omid Alishah	Merooj	Irancell	Shahr Bank^{1}, Lenz^{2}
Sanat Naft	(Iran) Faraz Kamalvand	(Iran) Taleb Reykani	Yousef Jameh	Arvand Free Zone	
Sepahan	(Portugal) José Morais	(Iran) Mohammad Karimi	Start	Mobarakeh Steel	
Shams Azar	(Iran) Saeid Daghighi	(Iran) Pouria Sarabadani	Yousef Jameh	Shams Azar Macaron	
Tractor	(Spain) Paco Jémez	(Iran) Shojae Khalilzadeh	Start	ATA Airlines	
Zob Ahan	(Iran) Mohammad Rabiei	(Iran) Mohammad Ghoreishi	Start	Melli Rail	

1. On the back of shirt.
2. On the sleeves.
3. On the shorts.

=== Managerial changes ===
Team	Outgoing head coach	Manner of departure	Date of vacancy	Position in table	Incoming head coach	Date of appointment
Gol Gohar	(Iran) Saeid Alhoei	End of caretaker spell	18 May 2023	Pre-season	(Greece) Marinos Ouzounidis	13 June 2023
Paykan	(Iran) Mojtaba Hosseini	End of contract	18 May 2023	Pre-season	(Iran) Rasoul Khatibi	26 June 2023
Mes Rafsanjan	(Iran) Mohammad Rabiei	End of contract	18 May 2023	Pre-season	(Iran) Saket Elhami	22 June 2023
Zob Ahan	(Iran) Mehdi Tartar	End of contract	18 May 2023	Pre-season	(Iran) Mohammad Rabiei	25 June 2023
Malavan	(Iran) Maziar Zare	End of contract	18 May 2023	Pre-season	(Iran) Mehdi Tartar	26 June 2023
Havadar	(Iran) Saket Elhami	Resigned	30 May 2023	Pre-season	(Iran) Mahmoud Fekri	6 June 2023
Nassaji Mazandaran	(Spain) Carlos Inarejos	Sacked	30 May 2023	Pre-season	(Iran) Mehdi Rahmati	6 June 2023
Aluminium Arak	(Iran) Mehdi Rahmati	Mutual Consent	4 June 2023	Pre-season	(Iran) Mojtaba Hosseini	18 June 2023
Esteghlal	(Portugal) Ricardo Sá Pinto	Signed by (Cyprus) APOEL	6 June 2023	Pre-season	(Iran) Javad Nekounam	21 June 2023
Foolad	(Iran) Alireza Mansourian	Sacked	24 August 2023	16th	(Spain) Juan Ignacio Martínez	6 September 2023
Paykan	(Iran) Rasoul Khatibi	Sacked	21 November 2023	13th	(Iran) Reza Enayati	22 November 2023
Nassaji Mazandaran	(Iran) Mehdi Rahmati	Resigned	20 December 2023	15th	(Spain) Lucas Alcaraz	24 December 2023
Havadar	(Iran) Mahmoud Fekri	Mutual Consent	20 December 2023	11th	(Iran) Masoud Shojaei	21 December 2023
Sanat Naft	(Iran) Abdollah Veisi	Resigned	30 December 2023	14th	(Iran) Sohrab Bakhtiarizadeh	11 January 2024
Persepolis	(Iran) Yahya Golmohammadi	Resigned	8 January 2024	3rd	(Brazil) Osmar Loss	11 January 2024
Mes Rafsanjan	(Iran) Saket Elhami	Sacked	23 January 2024	10th	(Iran) Moharram Navidkia	3 February 2024
Foolad	(Spain) Juan Ignacio Martínez	Mutual Consent	13 February 2024	11th	(Iran) Ahmad Alenemeh	22 February 2024
Nassaji Mazandaran	(Spain) Lucas Alcaraz	Mutual Consent	23 February 2024	15th	(Iran) Saket Elhami	23 February 2024
Foolad	(Iran) Ahmad Alenemeh	Sacked	16 March 2024	12th	(Iran) Abdollah Veisi	16 March 2024
Sanat Naft	(Iran) Sohrab Bakhtiarizadeh	Sacked	19 March 2024	16th	(Iran) Faraz Kamalvand	19 March 2024

== Foreign players ==
The number of foreign players is restricted to six per Persian Gulf Pro League team, including a slot for a player from AFC countries.
In bold: Players that have been capped for their national team.

Club	Player 1	Player 2	Player 3	Player 4	Player 5	AFC player	Former players
Aluminium							
Esteghlal	(Argentina) Gustavo Blanco Leschuk	(Brazil) Raphael Silva				(Uzbekistan) **Jaloliddin Masharipov**	(France) Arthur Yamga
Est. Khuzestan	(Brazil) Sávio Roberto	(Senegal) Ousmane Ndong	(Uzbekistan) **Dostonbek Tursunov**		(Iraq) **Aso Rostam**		
Foolad	(Austria) Christopher Knett	(Brazil) Jeferson Bahia	(Brazil) Lucas Cândido	(Brazil) Chimba	(Mali) Moussa Coulibaly	(Ba'athist Syria) **Ibrahim Hesar**	(Nigeria) Godwin Mensha
Gol Gohar	(Gabon) Eric Bocoum	(Spain) Roberto Torres	(Suriname) **Mitchell te Vrede**				
Havadar							
Malavan							
Mes Rafsanjan	(Iraq) **Muntadher Mohammed**	(Iraq) **Mustafa Mohammed**				(Iraq) **Ali Adnan Kadhim**	(Brazil) Chimba
Nassaji	(Brazil) Luan Polli						(Iraq) **Alaa Abbas** (Spain) Nono
Paykan							
Persepolis	(Georgia (country)) **Giorgi Gvelesiani**	(Qatar) **Abdelkarim Hassan**	(Uzbekistan) **Oston Urunov**			(Tajikistan) **Vakhdat Khanonov**	(Sweden) **Nabil Bahoui**
Sanat Naft	(The Gambia) **Bubacarr Trawally**					(Iraq) **Ali Yousif**	(Iraq) **Abbas Qasim** (Iraq) **Fahad Talib**
Sepahan	(Burkina Faso) **Bryan Dabo**	(Ghana) Issah Abass					(Brazil) Nilson Júnior
Shams Azar							
Tractor	(Brazil) Gustavo Vagenin	(Portugal) Ricardo Alves	(Serbia) Miloš Deletić			(Iraq) **Safaa Hadi**	(Spain) Álvaro Jiménez
Zob Ahan	(Georgia (country)) **Grigol Chabradze**						

== League table ==
=== Standings ===
Pos	Team	Pld	W	D	L	GF	GA	GD	Pts	Qualification or relegation
1	Persepolis (C)	30	20	8	2	45	18	+27	68	Qualification for the 2024–25 AFC Champions League Elite phase
2	Esteghlal	30	19	10	1	40	15	+25	67	Qualification for the 2024–25 AFC Champions League Elite phase
3	Sepahan	30	17	6	7	53	26	+27	57	Qualification for the 2024–25 AFC Champions League Elite qualifying play-offs (Note: Qualified as the 2023–24 Hazfi Cup winners.)
4	Tractor	30	16	6	8	42	22	+20	54	Qualification for the 2024–25 AFC Champions League Two group stage
5	Zob Ahan	30	11	9	10	30	29	+1	42	
6	Malavan	30	10	11	9	31	26	+5	41	
7	Aluminium Arak	30	10	9	11	27	33	−6	39 (Note: Aluminium Arak finished ahead of Shams Azar on head-to-head goal difference: Aluminium Arak 2–0 Shams Azar, Shams Azar 2–1 Aluminium Arak)	
8	Shams Azar (Note: Shams Azar was deducted 3 points due to the use of an unauthorized player.)	30	11	9	10	35	35	0	39	
9	Gol Gohar	30	8	12	10	29	28	+1	36	
10	Mes Rafsanjan	30	8	11	11	32	37	−5	35	
11	Foolad	30	7	8	15	20	40	−20	29 (Note: Foolad finished ahead of Nassaji Mazandaran and Havadar on head-to-head points: Foolad 10, Nassaji Mazandaran 4, Havadar 2)	
12	Nassaji Mazandaran	30	7	8	15	27	36	−9	29	
13	Havadar	30	6	11	13	31	48	−17	29	
14	Esteghlal Khuzestan	30	6	10	14	31	42	−11	28	
15	Paykan (R)	30	4	15	11	25	38	−13	27	Relegation to 2024–25 Azadegan League
16	Sanat Naft (R)	30	4	9	17	24	49	−25	21	Relegation to 2024–25 Azadegan League

Source: Iran Football League Organization - League Full Table, Iplstats
Rules for classification: 1) Points; 2) Head-to-head points; 3) Head-to-head goal difference; 4) Total goal difference; 5) Total goals scored; 6) Play-off at neutral venue.
(Note: Head-to-head record is used only after all the matches between the teams in question have been played).
(C) Champions; (R) Relegated

== Results ==
Home \ Away	ALU	EST	ESK	FOL	GOL	HAV	MLV	MES	NSJ	PAY	PRS	SNA	SEP	SAQ	TRC	ZOB
Aluminium Arak	—	0–1	1–0	1–1	0–0	1–1	1–1	1–3	1–0	1–1	1–0	1–1	0–1	2–0	0–4	1–1
Esteghlal	1–0	—	1–0	1–0	1–0	3–2	1–0	2–2	4–0	2–1	0–0	1–0	1–0	3–2	2–0	2–1
Esteghlal Khuzestan	3–2	0–1	—	0–0	1–1	3–1	1–1	2–1	1–4	0–1	2–2	2–1	1–3	1–1	0–1	1–2
Foolad	1–0	0–0	1–0	—	0–1	3–3	1–1	0–1	1–0	2–2	0–2	1–2	1–3	0–1	0–2	1–0
Gol Gohar	2–3	1–1	2–2	3–0	—	3–3	1–1	2–0	3–0	2–2	0–1	1–0	3–1	0–0	0–1	1–2
Havadar	1–2	0–1	2–0	0–1	1–0	—	0–1	0–0	0–5	0–0	0–2	2–1	0–5	2–1	0–1	2–2
Malavan	1–1	1–1	1–1	4–0	1–0	1–1	—	0–1	1–0	2–0	0–0	1–0	1–2	0–2	0–0	1–2
Mes Rafsanjan	2–0	0–1	2–3	3–0	1–1	0–0	1–4	—	1–1	2–2	1–1	0–2	1–1	0–3	1–1	2–2
Nassaji	0–1	0–0	1–0	0–1	0–1	2–2	0–1	0–3	—	1–1	1–2	3–1	1–1	1–0	1–0	1–2
Paykan	0–1	0–2	1–0	0–0	0–0	2–2	1–0	0–1	1–1	—	1–3	2–2	1–3	1–1	0–0	0–0
Persepolis	1–0	1–1	4–3	4–2	1–0	1–0	1–0	1–0	1–0	2–0	—	2–2	0–0	2–1	2–0	1–1
Sanat Naft	1–2	0–3	1–1	0–2	0–1	0–2	1–1	1–0	1–1	1–1	0–3	—	2–1	2–2	0–3	0–1
Sepahan	0–1	1–0	1–1	3–1	2–0	2–0	2–3	4–1	0–0	2–3	1–0	4–1	—	4–1	3–1	1–0
Shams Azar	2–1	2–2	0–0	1–0	1–1	1–2	1–0	0–0	2–1	2–1	1–3	0–0	1–0	—	0–2	1–2
Tractor	1–1	0–0	2–0	2–0	2–0	4–2	3–1	1–0	3–0	2–0	0–1	3–0	0–0	2–3	—	1–4
Zob Ahan	2–0	1–1	0–2	0–0	0–0	0–0	0–1	1–2	0–2	1–0	0–1	2–1	0–2	0–2	1–0	—

Legend: Blue = home team win; Yellow = draw; Red = away team win.
For upcoming matches, an "a" indicates there is an article about the rivalry between the two participants.

=== Positions by round ===
The table lists the positions of teams after each week of matches. In order to preserve chronological evolvements, any postponed matches are not included to the round at which they were originally scheduled, but added to the full round they were played immediately afterwards.

Team ╲ Round	1	2	3	4	5	6	7	8	9	10	11	12	13	14	15	16	17	18	19	20	21	22	23	24	25	26	27	28	29	30
Aluminium Arak	12	6	5	4	5	5	6	8	9	9	9	8	8	8	8	8	8	7	8	8	7	7	9	10	10	8	9	7	8	7
Esteghlal	1	2	4	3	4	4	3	2	1	1	2	2	2	2	1	1	1	1	1	1	1	1	1	1	1	1	1	2	2	2
Est. Khuzestan	6	12	15	15	15	16	16	16	16	16	16	16	16	16	16	16	14	14	15	14	14	14	14	14	15	13	15	15	15	14
Foolad	14	15	16	16	16	15	12	15	15	12	14	14	12	11	11	12	12	12	12	13	13	13	13	13	14	15	14	14	14	11
Gol Gohar	2	4	2	5	2	2	4	4	4	3	4	5	6	7	7	6	6	5	6	5	6	6	6	6	6	6	7	8	9	9
Havadar	10	5	6	8	10	12	14	12	11	11	11	11	13	12	12	11	11	11	11	11	11	12	11	11	11	11	11	11	12	13
Malavan	11	13	9	10	8	7	7	6	5	6	5	7	5	6	6	5	5	6	5	6	5	5	5	5	5	5	5	5	5	6
Mes Rafsanjan	9	10	13	13	11	9	9	9	8	8	8	10	10	10	10	10	10	10	10	10	10	10	10	9	9	10	10	10	10	10
Nassaji	8	9	12	7	9	11	13	11	14	15	15	15	15	15	15	14	15	16	16	15	15	16	15	15	13	14	13	13	11	12
Paykan	7	10	10	12	14	14	11	13	12	13	13	12	14	13	13	13	13	13	13	12	12	11	12	12	12	12	12	12	13	15
Persepolis	5	3	3	2	3	3	2	3	3	4	3	3	3	3	3	3	3	2	2	2	2	2	2	2	2	2	2	1	1	1
Sanat Naft	15	8	8	11	13	13	15	14	13	14	12	13	11	14	14	15	16	15	14	16	16	15	16	16	16	16	16	16	16	16
Sepahan	3	1	1	1	1	1	1	1	2	2	1	1	1	1	2	2	2	3	4	4	4	4	3	3	3	3	3	3	3	3
Shams Azar	16	16	14	14	12	10	10	10	10	10	10	9	9	9	9	9	9	9	9	9	9	8	7	8	7	7	6	6	6	8
Tractor	13	14	11	6	6	6	5	7	6	7	7	4	4	4	4	4	4	4	3	3	3	3	4	4	4	4	4	4	4	4
Zob Ahan	4	7	7	9	7	8	8	5	7	5	6	6	7	5	5	7	7	8	7	7	8	9	8	7	8	9	8	9	7	5

Leader : 2024–25 AFC Champions League Elite Group stage
AFC Champions League Elite Group stage
AFC Cup group stage
Relegation to 2024–25 Azadegan League

Updated to match(es) played on 13 July 2024. Source: Iran Football League Organization

== Season statistics ==
As of 1 June 2024

=== Scoring ===
- First goal of the season:
  (Iran) Amir Taher for Paykan against Nassaji (9 August 2023)

=== Top scorers ===
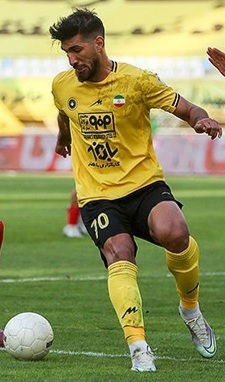
Shahriyar Moghanlou won his second successive Persian Gulf Pro League Golden Boot after scoring 16 goals for Sepahan.

Rank	Player	Club	Goals
1	(Iran) Shahriyar Moghanlou	Sepahan	16
2	(Iran) Reza Asadi	Sepahan	10
2	(Iran) Rahman Jafari	Shams Azar / Tractor	10
4	(Iran) Javad Aghaeipour	Esteghlal Khuzestan	9
4	(Iran) Issa Alekasir	Sepahan / Persepolis	9
4	(Iran) Reza Jafari	Malavan	9
7	(Iran) Mohammad Reza Azadi	Nassaji	8
7	(Iran) Mehrdad Mohammadi	Esteghlal	8
7	(Iran) Ramin Rezaeian	Sepahan	8
7	(Iran) Amirmasoud Sarabadani	Shams Azar	8
7	(Iran) Saeid Saharkhizan	Gol Gohar	8
7	(Iran) Mohammad Reza Soleimani	Malavan	8

==== Hat-tricks ====
Player	For	Against	Result	Date
(Iran) Shahab Zahedi	Persepolis	Paykan	3–1 (A)	19 October 2023
(Iran) Ramin Rezaeian	Sepahan	Shams Azar	4–1 (H)	1 June 2024

=== Top assists ===
Rank	Player	Club	Assists
1	(Portugal) Ricardo Alves	Tractor	10
2	(Iran) Abolfazl Jalali	Esteghlal	9
3	(Iran) Danial Esmaeilifar	Persepolis	7
4	(Spain) Roberto Torres	Gol Gohar	6
4	(Iran) Omid Alishah	Persepolis	6
6	(Iran) Reza Jafari	Malavan	5
6	(Iran) Abolfazl Razzaghpour	Gol Gohar	5
6	(Iran) Ramin Rezaeian	Sepahan	5
6	(Iran) Mehdi Torabi	Persepolis	5
6	(Iran) Saman Nariman Jahan	Paykan	5

=== Clean sheets ===
Rank	Player	Club	Clean sheets
1	(Iran) Hossein Hosseini	Esteghlal	17
1	(Iran) Hossein Pour Hamidi	Tractor	17
3	(Iran) Alireza Beiranvand	Persepolis	12
4	(Iran) Mohammad Reza Akhbari	Gol Gohar	11
5	(Iran) Alireza Jafarpour	Shams Azar	10
6	(Austria) Christopher Knett	Foolad	8
6	(Iran) Habib Far Abbasi	Malavan / Zob Ahan	8
8	(Iran) Alireza Haghighi	Havadar	7
8	(Iran) Hamed Lak	Mes Rafsanjan	7
8	(Iran) Ahmad Gohari	Aluminium	7

== Attendances ==
=== Average home attendances ===
Pos	Team	Total	High	Low	Average	Change
1	Esteghlal	409,800	60,000	0	34,150	+138.0%
2	Persepolis	402,000	70,000	0	33,500	+45.0%
3	Tractor	415,000	80,000	0	31,923	−4.4%
4	Sepahan	252,800	60,000	0	18,057	−29.5%
5	Nassaji	123,500	16,000	4,000	8,233	−4.0%
6	Foolad	107,500	30,000	500	7,167	−15.7%
7	Malavan	106,000	11,000	5,000	7,067	+31.5%
8	Shams Azar	81,000	15,000	1,000	5,786	n/a
9	Sanat Naft	62,200	10,000	0	4,785	+19.6%
10	Gol Gohar	61,500	9,000	1,500	4,100	+23.0%
11	Esteghlal Khuzestan	60,900	20,000	400	4,060	n/a
12	Aluminium Arak	52,500	15,000	0	3,750	+7.8%
13	Zob Ahan	39,700	13,000	500	2,647	+230.9%
14	Mes Rafsanjan	33,100	10,000	100	2,207	+20.6%
15	Paykan	11,300	10,000	0	1,883	−44.3%
16	Havadar	200	200	0	200	+27.4%
	League total	2,219,000	80,000	0	10,824	+13.8%

Updated to games played on 1 June 2024
Source: Iranleague.ir
Notes:
Matches with spectator bans are not included in average attendances
Esteghlal Khuzestan and Shams Azar played in the previous season in the Azadegan League

=== Attendances by round ===
Team/Round	1	2	3	4	5	6	7	8	9	10	11	12	13	14	15	16	17	18	19	20	21	22	23	24	25	26	27	28	29	30	Average
Aluminium Arak	A	5,000	A	2,000	A	A	3,000	A	1,000	A	1,000	A	2,000	A	2,000	15,000	A	1,500	A	1,000	1,000	A	15,000	A	NC	A	1,000	A	2,000	A	3,750
Esteghlal	A	NC	A	NC	A	26,800	A	25,000	A	45,000	A	A	15,000	A	15,000	NC	A	20,000	A	55,000	A	20,000	A	40,000	A	30,000	58,000	A	60,000	A	34,150
Esteghlal Khuzestan	1,000	A	4,000	A	1,000	A	1,000	A	1,000	A	2,000	A	20,000	1,000	A	A	400	A	15,000	A	1,500	A	1,000	A	1,000	A	4,000	A	A	7,000	4,060
Foolad	A	6,000	A	25,000	A	6,000	A	4,000	A	4,000	A	30,000	A	A	3,000	500	A	3,000	A	2,000	A	3,000	A	5,000	A	6,000	A	3,000	7,000	A	7,167
Gol Gohar	5,000	A	A	6,000	A	7,000	A	3,500	A	6,000	A	7,000	A	8,000	A	A	2,000	1,500	A	1,500	A	9,000	A	2,500	A	1,000	A	1,000	A	500	4,100
Havadar	NC	A	NC	A	NC	A	NC	A	NC	A	NC	A	NC	A	200	A	NC	A	NC	A	NC	A	NC	A	NC	A	NC	A	NC	A	200
Malavan	5,000	A	8,000	A	6,000	A	5,000	11,000	A	9,000	A	8,000	A	9,000	A	A	10,000	A	7,000	A	5,000	A	A	8,000	A	5,000	A	5,000	A	5,000	7,067
Mes Rafsanjan	A	2,000	2,000	A	100	A	1,000	A	3,000	A	2,000	A	1,000	A	10,000	300	A	A	2,000	A	700	A	2,000	A	2,000	A	4,000	A	1,000	A	2,207
Nassaji	7,500	A	12,000	8,000	A	5,000	A	8,000	A	8,000	A	7,000	A	7,000	A	A	5,000	A	A	5,000	A	8,000	A	8,000	A	15,000	A	16,000	A	4,000	8,233
Paykan	A	300	A	NC	A	10,000	A	200	A	200	A	100	A	NC	A	NC	A	NC	A	500	A	NC	A	NC	A	NC	A	NC	A	NC	1,883
Persepolis	NC	A	NC	A	60,000	A	30,000	A	15,000	A	20,000	10,000	A	12,000	A	A	NC	A	30,000	A	15,000	A	30,000	A	60,000	A	A	50,000	A	70,000	33,500
Sanat Naft	10,000	A	5,000	A	4,000	NC	A	5,000	A	3,000	A	4,000	A	NC	A	A	3,000	A	4,000	A	A	5,200	A	10,000	A	3,000	A	5,000	A	1,000	4,785
Sepahan	35,000	A	55,000	A	12,000	A	10,000	A	15,000	60,000	A	7,800	A	NC	A	A	7,000	A	10,000	A	12,000	A	7,000	A	A	7,000	A	8,000	A	7,000	18,057
Shams Azar	A	10,000	A	A	3,000	A	3,000	A	12,000	A	3,000	A	2,000	A	15,000	1,000	A	2,000	4,000	A	5,000	A	3,000	A	NC	A	3,000	A	15,000	A	5,786
Tractor	A	80,000	A	15,000	A	25,000	A	A	20,000	A	10,000	A	NC	A	30,000	80,000	A	10,000	A	30,000	A	25,000	40,000	A	35,000	A	15,000	A	NC	A	31,923
Zob Ahan	A	13,000	A	500	A	1,000	A	2,000	A	A	13,000	A	600	A	1,000	700	A	3,000	A	700	A	1,000	A	1,000	700	A	1,000	A	500	A	2,647
Total	63,500	116,300	86,000	56,500	86,100	80,800	53,000	58,700	67,000	135,200	51,000	73,900	40,600	37,000	76,200	97,500	27,400	41,000	72,000	95,700	40,200	71,200	98,000	74,500	98,700	67,000	86,000	88,000	85,500	94,500	2,219,000
Average	10,583	16,614	14,333	9,417	12,300	11,543	7,571	7,338	9,571	16,900	7,286	9,238	6,767	7,400	9,525	16,250	4,567	5,857	10,286	11,963	5,743	10,171	14,000	10,643	19,740	9,571	12,286	12,571	14,250	13,500	10,824

Notes:
Updated to games played on 1 June 2024. Source: Iranleague.ir
Matches with spectator bans are not included in average attendances

=== Highest attendances ===
Rank	Home team	Score	Away team	Attendance	Date	Week	Stadium
1	Tractor	0–1	Persepolis	80,000	16 August 2023	2	Sahand
1	Tractor	0–0	Sepahan	80,000	3 April 2024	16	Sahand
2	Persepolis	1–0	Mes Rafsanjan	70,000	1 June 2024	30	Azadi
4	Persepolis	1–1	Esteghlal	60,000	14 December 2023	5	Azadi
4	Sepahan	1–0	Persepolis	60,000	12 November 2023	10	Naghsh-e Jahan
4	Persepolis	0–0	Sepahan	60,000	1 May 2024	25	Azadi
4	Esteghlal	1–0	Gol Gohar	60,000	28 May 2024	29	Azadi
7	Esteghlal	1–0	Foolad	58,000	13 May 2024	27	Azadi
9	Sepahan	1–0	Esteghlal	55,000	23 August 2023	3	Naghsh-e Jahan
9	Esteghlal	0–0	Persepolis	55,000	13 March 2024	20	Azadi

Notes:
Updated to games played on 1 June 2024. Source: Iranleague.ir

== See also ==
- 2023–24 Azadegan League
- 2023–24 2nd Division
- 2023–24 3rd Division
- 2023–24 Hazfi Cup
- 2023 Iranian Super Cup
- 2023–24 AFC Champions League
