= Taleb Rikani =

Iranian footballer

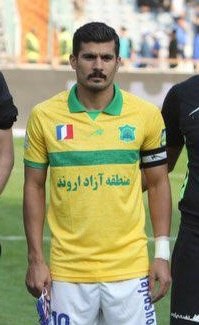
- Rikani in 2019

Personal information
- Date of birth: 15 April 1990 (age 36)
- Place of birth: Bandar-e Mahshahr, Iran
- Height: 1.81 m (5 ft 11 in)
- Position: Attacking midfielder

Team information
- Current team: Sanat Naft Abadan
- Number: 10

Senior career*
Years	Team	Apps	(Gls)
2010–2012	Sanat Naft	17	(1)
2012–2013	Foolad	10	(2)
2013–2015	Sanat Naft	25	(1)
2015–2016	Esteghlal Ahvaz	24	(3)
2016–2017	Sepahan	14	(2)
2017–2018	Esteghlal Khuzestan	8	(0)
2018–2024	Sanat Naft	176	(36)
2024–2025	Aluminium Arak	10	(1)
2025–	Sanat Naft	56	(8)
- * Club domestic league appearances and goals as of 21 April 2025

Taleb Rikani (Persian: طالب ریکانی; born 15 April 1990) is an Iranian professional footballer who plays as an attacking midfielder for Sanat Naft in the Persian Gulf Pro League.

== Club career ==
Rikani began his career with Sanat Naft Abadan F.C. from the Iran Pro League and played 16 matches. After the relegation, he went to Foolad and played ten games with two goals; they finished 4th. Rikani then returned to Sanat Naft again and he played in the Azadegan League.

== Career statistics ==
As of 11 April 2014

Appearances and goals by club, season and competition
Club	Season	League			Cup (Note: Includes Hazfi Cup.)		Continental		Total	
Club	Season	Division	Apps	Goals	Apps	Goals	Apps	Goals	Apps	Goals
Sanat Naft	2009-10	Azadegan League	2	1	0	0	-	-	2	1
Sanat Naft	2010–11	Pro League	10	1	0	0	–		10	1
Sanat Naft	2011–12	Pro League	6	0	1	0	–		7	0
Sanat Naft	Total		18	2	1	0	0	0	19	2
Foolad	2011–12	Persian Gulf Pro League	8	2	0	0	–		8	2
Foolad	2012–13	Persian Gulf Pro League	2	0	0	0	–		2	0
Foolad	Total		10	2	0	0	0	0	10	2
Sanat Naft	2013–14	Azadegan League	7	0	0	0	–		7	0
Sanat Naft	2014-15	Azadegan League	15	1	0	0	0	0	15	1
Sanat Naft	Total		22	1	0	0	0	0	22	1
Esteghlal Ahvaz	2015-16	Persian Gulf Pro League	24	3	1	0	0	0	25	3
Sepahan	2016-17	Persian Gulf Pro League	14	2	3	0	0	0	17	2
Esteghlal Kh	2017-18	Persian Gulf Pro League	8	0	1	0	0	0	9	0
Sanat	2017-18	Persian Gulf Pro League	13	1	1	0	0	0	14	1
Sanat	2018-19	Persian Gulf Pro League	27	6	2	1	0	0	29	7
Sanat	2019-20	Persian Gulf Pro League	29	3	1	0	0	0	30	3
Sanat	2020-21	Persian Gulf Pro League	29	9	2	1	0	0	31	10
Sanat	2021-22	Persian Gulf Pro League	26	6	1	0	0	0	27	6
Sanat	2022-23	Persian Gulf Pro League	22	5	1	0	0	0	22	5
Sanat	2023-24	Persian Gulf Pro League	30	6	1	1	0	0	31	7
Sanat	2024-25	Azadegan League	17	1	3	1	-	-	20	2
Sanat	2025-26	Azadegan League	15	1	0	0	-	-	15	1
Sanat	Total		208	38	12	4	0	0	220	42
Aluminium	2024-25	Persian Gulf Pro League	10	1	1	0	-	-	11	1
Career total			314	49	19	4	0	0	333	53
