= Mohammad Deris =

Iranian association football player

Personal information
- Date of birth: 31 May 1995 (age 31)
- Place of birth: Abadan, Iran
- Height: 2.00 m (6 ft 7 in)
- Position: Goalkeeper

Team information
- Current team: Be'sat Kermanshah
- Number: 12

Youth career
- –2016: Sanat Naft

Senior career*
Years	Team	Apps	(Gls)
2016–2020	Sanat Naft	17	(0)
2020–2021	Paykan	14	(0)
2021–2023	Nirooye Zamini	30	(0)
2023–2025	Foolad B	24	(0)
2025–	Be'sat Kermanshah	14	(0)
- * Club domestic league appearances and goals as of 26 February 2025

Mohammad Deris (Persian: محمد دریس; born 31 May 1995) is an Iranian footballer who plays as a Goalkeeper for Be'sat Kermanshah in the Azadegan League.

== Club career ==
=== Sanat Naft ===
He made his debut for Sanat Naft in last fixtures of 2017–18 Iran Pro League against Esteghlal Khuzestan.
