= Vahid Kheshtan =

Iranian footballer

Personal information
- Date of birth: 11 June 1992 (age 34)
- Place of birth: Yasuj, Iran
- Height: 1.79 m (5 ft 10 in)
- Position: Winger

Team information
- Current team: Naft Gachsaran
- Number: 3

Senior career*
Years	Team	Apps	(Gls)
2015–2016	Shohadaye Artesh	26	(1)
2016–2017	Zagros Yasouj		
2017	Shahin Bushehr		
2017–2018	Naft Gachsaran		
2018–2020	Esteghlal Khuzestan	28	(6)
2020	Navad Urmia	7	(0)
2020–2021	Baadraan Tehran	13	(0)
2021	Naft Masjed Soleyman	3	(0)
2021–2022	Khooshe Talaee	9	(1)
2022–2023	Mes Shahr-e Babak	15	(0)
2023–2024	Shahr Raz Shiraz	4	(0)
2024	Ettehad Kohgiluyeh		
2024–	Naft Gachsaran		
- * Club domestic league appearances and goals as of 15 April 2024

Vahid Kheshtan (Persian: وحید خشتان; born 11 June 1992) is an Iranian footballer who plays as a forward for Naft Gachsaran.

== Club career ==
=== Club career statistics ===
As of 30 August 2018.

Club	Division	Season	League		Hazfi Cup		Asia		Total	
Club	Division	Season	Apps	Goals	Apps	Goals	Apps	Goals	Apps	Goals
Esteghlal Khuzestan	Pro League	2018–19	6	4	0	0	–	–	6	4
Career Totals			6	4	0	0	0	0	6	4
