= Beasat Kermanshah F.C. =

Iranian football club

Be'sat Kermanshah
- Full name: Be'sat Kermanshah Football Club
- Founded: 2012; 12 years ago
- Ground: Azadi Stadium (Kermanshah)
- Capacity: 7,000
- Chairman: Afshin Hassani
- Manager: Mohammad Mir Torabi
- League: Azadegan League
- 2025–26: Azadegan League, 11th
- Website: http://www.beasat.org/
Home colours	Away colours

Beasat Kermanshah Football Club (Persian: باشگاه فوتبال بعثت کرمانشاه) is an Iranian football club based in Kermanshah, Iran. They currently compete in the Azadegan League.

== Players ==
As of 27 August 2026

Note: Flags indicate national team as defined under FIFA eligibility rules; some limited exceptions apply. Players may hold more than one non-FIFA nationality.

No.	Pos.	Nation	Player
1	GK	IRI	Ali Mohsenzadeh
2	DF	IRI	Mohammad Mehdi Mehdikhani
3	DF	IRI	Alireza Adhami
4	DF	IRI	Omid Soltani
5	DF	IRI	Mohammad Reza Damadi
7	FW	IRI	Amin Asadi
8	MF	IRI	Hamid Reza Zarei
10	FW	IRI	Shayan Hassani
11	FW	IRI	Arshia Sarabadani
12	GK	IRI	Mohammad Deris
14	DF	IRI	Amir Abbas Shirkavand
16	MF	IRI	Mehdi Daghdar
19	MF	IRI	Ahmad Reza Azizi
20	MF	IRI	Armin Najafi
21	MF	IRI	Mohammad Amin Rezanejad

No.	Pos.	Nation	Player
22	GK	IRI	Ramtin Khalaji
25	DF	IRI	Iliya Goudarzi
26	MF	IRI	Morteza Hosseinzadeh
27	DF	IRI	Arsalan Niazi
33	GK	IRI	Seyed Mahyar Mousavi
44	DF	IRI	Hadi Rafsanjani
55	DF	IRI	Arman Lotfekhoda
66	MF	IRI	Saeid Hosseinpour
70	FW	IRI	Ahmad Jabouri
77	DF	IRI	Saeid Aghaei
—	MF	IRI	Kavan Mirahmadi
—	MF	IRI	Hossein Hajizadeh
—	FW	IRI	Ahmad Baharvandi
—	FW	IRI	Nima Norouzi

== Season-by-Season ==
The table below shows the achievements of the club in various competitions.

Season	League	Position	Hazfi Cup	Notes
2013–14	League 3	3rd	Did not qualify	Promoted
2014–15	League 2	4th	Fourth Round
2015–16	League 2	4th		Advanced to the second round
2021–22	League 2	12th
2022–23	League 2	7th	Fourth Round
2023–24	League 2	4th		Promoted
2024–25	Azadegan	11th	Round of 16

== See also ==
- 2015–16 Iran Football's 2nd Division
