= 2022–23 League 2 (Iran) =

Iran Football's 2nd Division
- Season: 2022–23
- Champions: Naft Va Gaz Gachsaran
- Promoted: Mes Sungun Varzaghan; Manategh Naftkhiz Jonoub; Damash Gilan
- Relegated: Machine Sazi Tabriz; Mes Novin Kerman; Vista Toorbin Tehran

The 2022–23 season of Iran Football's 2nd Division was the 22nd under 2nd Division since its establishment (current format) in 2001. The season featured 21 teams from the 2nd Division 2021–22, three new team relegated from the 2021–22 Azadegan League: Vista Toorbin Tehran, Shahin Bushehr, Machine Sazi Tabriz, and four new teams promoted from the 3rd Division 2021–22: Ario Bam Eslamshahr, Panik Talesh, Foolad Hormozgan and Damash Gilan. The draw for the league was held on 13 September 2022.
These changes took effect before the season started:

Team	Replaced team
Payam Toos Khorasan	Kian Sam Babol
Khalij Fars Mahshahr	Mes Sungun

== Teams ==
=== Stadia and locations ===
Locations of clubs in 2021–22 Iran Football's 2nd Division

=== Number of teams by region ===
	Region	Number of teams	Teams
1	Tehran	5	Vista Toorbin, Ario Bam Eslamshahr, Espad Alvand, Shahid Oraki Eslamshahr, Nirooye Zamini
2	Gilan	3	Damash Gilan, Sepidrood Rasht, Panik Talesh
3	Mazandaran	3	Shahrdari Noshahr, Kian Sam Babol, Shohadaye Babolsar
4	Hormozgan	2	Foolad Hormozgan, Shahrdari Bandar Abbas
5	Kerman	2	Mes Novin, Shahrdari Bam
6	Khuzestan	2	Foolad Novin, Shahrdari Mahshahr
7	East Azerbaijan	2	Machine Sazi Tabriz, Mes Sungun Varzaghan
8	Alborz	1	Shohadaye Razakan
9	Bushehr	1	Shahin Bushehr
10	Hamedan	1	PAS Hamedan
11	Kermanshah	1	Besat
12	Kohgiluyeh and Boyer-Ahmad	1	Manategh Naftkhiz Jonoob
13	North Khorasan	1	Atrak Bojnourd
14	Fars	1	Iman Sabz Shiraz
15	West Azerbaijan	1	Navad Urumia
16	Yazd	1	Shahid Ghandi Yazd

== League table ==
=== Group A ===
Pos	Team	Pld	W	D	L	GF	GA	GD	Pts	Promotion or relegation
1	Mes Sungun Varzaghan (P)	24	17	3	4	51	18	+33	54	2023–24 Azadegan League & Final Match
2	Foolad Novin Ahvaz	24	14	7	3	36	15	+21	49	Promotion Play-off
3	Foolad Hormozgan	24	10	8	6	27	19	+8	38	
4	Sepidrood Rasht	24	10	7	7	25	17	+8	37	
5	Pas Hamedan	24	9	7	8	24	29	−5	34	
6	Shahid Oraki Eslamshahr	24	7	10	7	21	17	+4	31	
7	Be'sat Kermanshah	24	7	9	8	22	27	−5	30	
8	Panik Talesh	24	6	10	8	21	25	−4	28	
9	Spad Alvand Tehran	24	6	9	9	17	21	−4	27	
10	Navad Urmia	24	5	10	9	18	25	−7	25	
11	Atrak Bojnourd	24	6	6	12	27	39	−12	24 (Note: Atrak Bojnourd is ahead of Iman Sabz Shiraz on head-to-head away goals: Iman Sabz Shiraz 4-1 Atrak Bojnourd, Atrak Bojnourd 3-0 Iman Sabz Shiraz.)	
12	Iman Sabz Shiraz	24	5	9	10	17	29	−12	24	
13	Vista Toorbin Tehran	24	4	5	15	22	47	−25	17	Relegation Play-off
14	Machine Sazi Tabriz (R) (Note: Machine Sazi Tabriz did not participate in two matches and therefore disqualified from the league and punished by two-level-relegation.)	0	0	0	0	0	0	0	0	Relegation to 2023–24 3rd Division 1st Stage

Updated to match(es) played on 7 May 2023. Source:
Rules for classification: 1) Points; 2) Head-to-head points; 3) Head-to-head goal difference; 4) Head-to-head goals scored; 5) Goal difference; 6) Goals scored; 7) Play-off at neutral venue.
(Note: Head-to-head record is used only after all the matches between the teams in question have been played).

=== Group B ===
Pos	Team	Pld	W	D	L	GF	GA	GD	Pts	Promotion or relegation
1	Naft va Gaz Gachsaran (C,P)	26	17	6	3	39	11	+28	57	2023–24 Azadegan League & Final Match
2	Damash Gilan	26	14	9	3	28	11	+17	51	Promotion Play-off
3	Shohadaye Razakan Karaj	26	14	7	5	27	18	+9	49	
4	Shahrdari Noshahr	26	12	6	8	27	16	+11	42	
5	Shahrdari Mahshahr	26	11	8	7	25	16	+9	41	
6	Shahid Ghandi Yazd	26	11	6	9	27	23	+4	39	
7	Shahrdari Bam	26	9	9	8	21	17	+4	36	
8	Ario Bam Eslamshahr	26	7	11	8	23	16	+7	32	
9	Shohadaye Babolsar	26	8	4	14	17	36	−19	28	
10	Nirooye Zamini Tehran	26	7	6	13	13	26	−13	27	
11	Sh. Bandar Abbas	26	5	10	11	19	30	−11	25	
12	Shahin Bushehr	26	6	6	14	14	34	−20	24	
13	Kian Sam Babol	26	5	8	13	18	29	−11	23	Relegation Play-off
14	Mes Novin Kerman (R)	26	2	12	12	16	31	−15	18	Relegation to 2023–24 3rd Division 2nd Stage

Updated to match(es) played on 21 May 2023. Source:
Rules for classification: 1) Points; 2) Head-to-head points; 3) Head-to-head goal difference; 4) Head-to-head goals scored; 5) Goal difference; 6) Goals scored; 7) Play-off at neutral venue.
(Note: Head-to-head record is used only after all the matches between the teams in question have been played).

== Relegation Play-Off ==
The last two teams (teams ranked 13th and 14th) from each group (total 4 teams) should have relegated to 3rd Division – 2nd Stage. But due to direct relegation of Shahr Khodro (Omid Vahdat) Mashhad from 1st division (Azadegan League) to 3rd Division – 2nd Stage (instead of 2nd Division), one fewer team would relegate from 2nd Division. Therefore, Relegation Playoff between 13th-placed teams has determined the relegated and remained team in 2nd Division.

Team 1	Agg.	Team 2	1st leg	2nd leg
Kian Sam Babol	2–1	Vista Toorbin Tehran	2-0	0–1

=== Leg 1 ===
2 June 2023
19:00

Kian Sam Babol	2-0	Vista Toorbin Tehran
Ehsan Ghobadi; Hossein Babajani

Shohadaye Simorgh Stadium, Ziar Kola, Simorgh

=== Leg 2 ===
9 June 2023
19:00

Vista Toorbin Tehran	1-0	Kian Sam Babol

Ghadir Studium, Tehran

Kian Sam Babol remained in the 2023-24 2nd Division and Vista Toorbin Tehran relegated to 3rd Division – 2nd Stage.

== Promotion Play-Off ==
Team 1	Agg.	Team 2	1st leg	2nd leg
Damash Gilan	2–1	Foolad Novin Ahvaz	2-0	0–1

=== Leg 1 ===
1 June 2023
19:00

Damash Gilan	2-0	Foolad Novin Ahvaz
Sajjad Gholi Beigi; Mi'ad Yazdani

Sardar Jangal Stadium, Rasht

=== Leg 2 ===
8 June 2023
19:00

Foolad Novin Ahvaz	1-0	Damash Gilan

Foolad Arena, Ahvaz

Damash Gilan promoted to 2023-24 Azadegan league

== 2nd Division Final ==
Team 1	Score	Team 2
Mes Sungun Varzaghan	1–1 (3–4 p)	Naft va Gaz Gachsaran

=== Single Match ===
28 May 2023
17:30

Mes Sungun Varzaghan	1-1	Naft va Gaz Gachsaran
Ali Fathi		Kheirollah Veisi Ara
Penalties
	3-4

Shahid Dastgerdi Stadium, Tehran

Naft va Gaz Gachsaran won the league and got the Champion Trophy.

== See also ==
- 2022–23 Persian Gulf Pro League
- 2022–23 Azadegan League
- 2022–23 3rd Division
- 2022–23 Hazfi Cup
- 2022 Iranian Super Cup
