= Naft va Gaz Gachsaran F.C. =

Iranian football club

Naft va gaz Gachsaran F.C.
- Full name: Naft va gaz Gachsaran Football Club
- Nicknames: The oils (نفتی ها, nafti-ha)
- Founded: 1967; 57 years ago
- Ground: Shohadaye Naft Gachsaran Stadium; Gachsaran, Iran
- Capacity: 7,500
- Manager: Dariush Yazdi
- League: Azadegan League
- 2023–24: Azadegan League, 10th of 18
Home colours

Naft Gachsaran Football Club is an Iranian football club based in Gachsaran, Iran. They currently compete in the Iranian Azadegan League.

== History ==
Naft Gachsaran was founded in 1967 by oil workers in the area. For much of the early years of the club, the team played only friendly matches and in local leagues.

After the revolution the club played mainly in the lower leagues of Iranian football. They reached the second tiered Azadegan League in 2013 before returning to League 2 in Iran.

== Players ==
=== First team squad ===
Note: Flags indicate national team as defined under FIFA eligibility rules; some limited exceptions apply. Players may hold more than one non-FIFA nationality.

No.	Pos.	Nation	Player
1	GK	IRN	Mohammadreza Shahriari
2	DF	IRN	Ali Hadadifar
3	DF	IRN	Vahid Kheshtan
4	DF	IRN	Roozbeh Arvaneh
5	DF	IRN	Mohammad Mehdipour
6	MF	IRN	Ahmad Dagheri
7	FW	IRN	Ali Gholamrezaei
8	MF	IRN	Amirhossein Eskandari
9	FW	IRN	Omid Alipour
10	FW	IRN	Saeid Karimi
11	FW	IRN	Jalil Panahi
13	DF	IRN	Ahmadreza Jenadeleh
14	DF	IRN	Yousef Jenadeleh
15	MF	IRN	Kambiz Forouhar
16	MF	IRN	Mohammad Alinejad
17	FW	IRN	Reza Bakhtiarizadeh
18	MF	IRN	Basam Kazemi

No.	Pos.	Nation	Player
19	FW	IRN	Hamidreza Payandeh
20	FW	IRN	Mehrshad Nazari
21	DF	IRN	Aria Delavari
22	GK	IRN	Abbas Bakhtiari
23	DF	IRN	Soheil Delfiefard
24	MF	IRN	Mohammad Jaymand
25	MF	IRN	Milad Afroogh
26	DF	IRN	Hossein Ansari
28	FW	IRN	Mostafa Arash
30	FW	IRN	Mosaddegh Beris
33	DF	IRN	Milad Sarvi
44	GK	IRN	Meghdad Maleki
55	DF	IRN	Mohammad Amin Saeidavi
66	MF	IRN	Hossein Bahrami
71	DF	IRN	Amin Kaabi
72	FW	IRN	Ali Alkasir

== Season-by-season ==
The table below shows the achievements of the club in various competitions.

Season	League	Position	Hazfi Cup	Notes
2010–11	2nd Division	6th/Group B	Did not qualify
2011–12	2nd Division	5th/Group A	Did not participate
2012–13	2nd Division	1st/Group A		Promoted
2013–14	Azadegan League	7th/Group B	Third Round
2014–15	Azadegan League	11th/Group A	Fourth Round	Relegated
2015–16	2nd Division	2nd/Group B	First Round	Play-off
2016–17	2nd Division	3rd/Group 1 (1st Stage); 6th/Group A (2nd Stage)	Quarter Final
2017–18	2nd Division	2nd/Group 2 (1st Stage); 2nd/Group B (2nd Stage)	Did not participate	Play-off
2018–19	2nd Division	4th/Group B	Did not participate
2019–20	2nd Division	7th/Group B	Did not participate
2020–21	2nd Division	14th/Group A	Did not participate	Relegated
2021–22	3rd Division - 2nd Stage	8th/Group 3	Did not qualify	Relegated
2022–23	2nd Division	1st/Group B	Did not participate	Promoted/Champion
2023–24	Azadegan League

== See also ==
- 2011-12 Hazfi Cup
- 2011–12 Iran Football's 2nd Division
