= Saeid Saharkhizan =

Iranian footballer (born 2003)

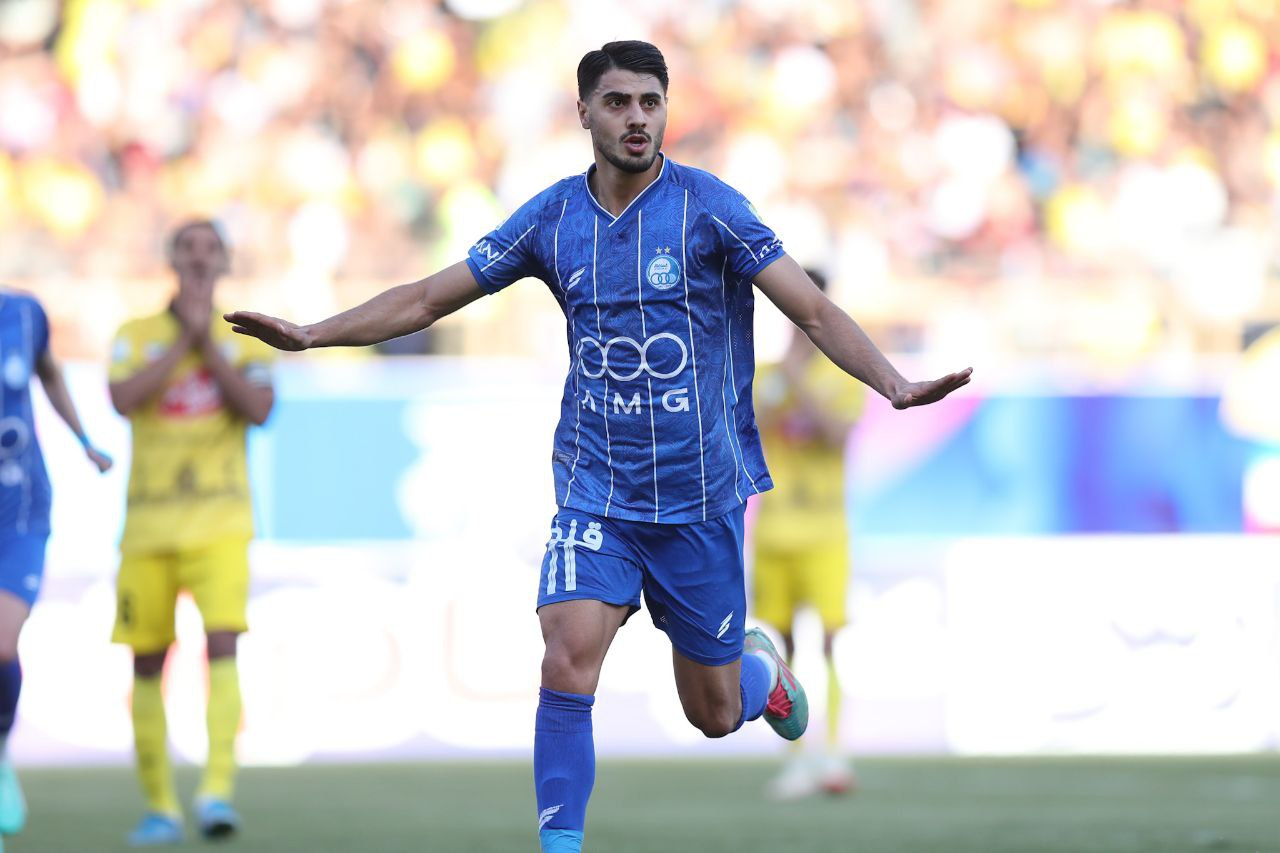
- Saharkhizan with Esteghlal in 2025

Personal information
- Full name: Saeid Saharkhizan Gendishmin
- Date of birth: 26 June 2003 (age 23)
- Place of birth: Ardabil, Iran
- Height: 1.80 m (5 ft 11 in)
- Position: Forward

Team information
- Current team: Esteghlal
- Number: 11

Youth career
- 2018–2021: Saipa
- 2021–2022: Paykan

Senior career*
Years	Team	Apps	(Gls)
2022–2023	Havadar	7	(3)
2023–2024	Gol Gohar	28	(8)
2024–2025	Orenburg	28	(7)
2025–	Esteghlal	32	(7)

International career^{‡}
2019–2023	Iran U20	6	(2)
2022–	Iran U23	7	(4)
- * Club domestic league appearances and goals as of 7 November 2026 ‡ National team caps and goals as of 18 November 2025

Saeid Saharkhizan (Persian: سعید سحرخیزان; born 26 June 2003) is an Iranian forward who plays as a forward for Esteghlal.

== Club career ==
=== Early career ===
Saharkhizan started his career as a youth player at Saipa and then transferred to Paykan.

=== Havadar ===
He joined Havadar in summer 2022 with a three-year contract. He made his debut on 31 August 2022 in the 4th match of the 2022–23 Persian Gulf Pro League season against Tractor as a substitute for Mohammad Javad Mohammadi.

=== Orenburg ===
On 9 July 2024, Saharkhizan signed with Orenburg in the Russian Premier League.

=== Esteghlal ===
On 8 August 2025, Saharkhizan returned to Iran and joined Esteghlal.

== Career statistics ==
As of match played 7 November 2026

Appearances and goals by club, season and competition
Club	Season	League			Cup		Continental		Other		Total	
Club	Season	Division	Apps	Goals	Apps	Goals	Apps	Goals	Apps	Goals	Apps	Goals
Havadar	2022–23	Pro League	7	3	1	0	—		—		8	3
Gol Gohar	2023–24	Pro League	28	8	4	2	—		—		32	10
Orenburg	2024–25	Russian Premier League	27	7	3	1	—		—		30	8
Orenburg	2025–26	Russian Premier League	1	0	1	0	—		—		2	0
Orenburg	Total		28	7	4	1	—		—		32	8
Esteghlal	2025–26	Pro League	21	4	2	0	8	1	1	0	32	5
Esteghlal	2026–27	Pro League	11	3	0	0	4	1	—		15	4
Esteghlal	Total		32	7	2	0	12	2	1	0	47	9
Career Totals			95	25	11	3	12	2	1	0	119	30

== International career ==
=== Under–20 ===
In July 2019, He was invited to the Iran national under-20 football team by Sirous Pourmousavi.

== Personal life ==
On 5 February 2026, Saharkhizan refused to celebrate a goal he scored against Shams Azar F.C. in solidarity with the 2025–2026 Iranian protests. On 9 February, he publicly objected to being included on a list of supporters of the 1979 Islamic Revolution by the Ministry of Sport and Youth, ahead of the Revolution's anniversary.
