= Shohada-ye Haftom-e Tir Stadium (Babol) =

Stadium in Babol, Iran

Coordinates: 29°37′N 52°32′E

- Interactive map of Shohada-ye Haftom-e Tir Stadium
- Full name: Shohada-ye Haftom-e Tir Stadium of Babol
- Location: Babol, Iran
- Owner: Physical Education Organization
- Capacity: 6,000 seated
- Surface: Grass
- Field size: 105 m × 75 m (344 ft × 246 ft)

Tenants
- F.C. Khooneh be Khooneh (2013–2019); F.C. Rayka Babol (2019–)

Shohada-ye Haftom-e Tir Stadium of Babol is a stadium on Babol, Iran. It is owned by the government Physical Education Organization and has a seating capacity of 6,000. Its primary tenant is F.C. Rayka Babol.

== See also ==
- Shohada-ye Haftom-e Tir Stadium
