= 2023 Iranian Super Cup =

- Persepolis claimed Iran’s Super Cup.

The 2023 Iranian Super Cup was the 9th Iranian Super Cup an annual football match played between the winners of the previous season's Persian Gulf Pro League and winner of Hazfi Cup. Persepolis won the 2023 Persian Gulf Pro League and 2023 Hazfi Cup, so Iran Football Association announced that Persepolis is the 2023 Super Cup winner.
