= Esteghlal Mollasani F.C. =

Iranian football club

Esteghlal Mollasani استقلال ملاثانی
- Full name: Esteghlal Mollasani Football Club
- Nickname: Âbihai-ye Kucek (Small blues)
- Founded: 1981; 45 years ago
- Ground: Shohadaye Mollasani Stadium
- Capacity: 5,000
- Owner: Mehrad Homsi
- Chairman: Mohsen Faridi
- Head Coach: Amir Mohammad Javaherkar
- League: Azadegan League
- 2020–21: Azadegan League, 13th

Esteghlal Mollasani Football Club is an Iranian football club based in Khuzestan province of Iran. This team was founded in 1981 in the city of Mollasani.

This team participated in the Hazfi Cup. The club is currently playing in Azadegan League. Esteghlal Mollasani is one of the representatives of Khuzestan province in the first division league.

== Players ==
=== First-team squad ===
Note: Flags indicate national team as defined under FIFA eligibility rules; some limited exceptions apply. Players may hold more than one non-FIFA nationality.

No.	Pos.	Nation	Player
22	DF	ALG	Melha D'dili
27	DF	IRN	Ali Daghagheleh
