= Shahrdari Astara F.C. =

Iranian football club

Shahrdari Astara
- Full name: Shahrdari Astara Football Club
- Ground: Vahdat Astara Stadium
- Capacity: 500
- Owner: Astara Municipality
- Chairman: Ali Kargar
- Head Coach: Pirouz Ghorbani
- League: Azadegan League
- 2020–21: Azadegan League, 15th

Shahrdari Astara Football Club is an Iranian football club based in Gilan province of Iran. This team was founded in Astara. The club is currently playing in the Iranian First Division Football League. Shahrdari Astara is one of the representatives of Gilan province in the Azadegan League. This team has also participated in the Hazfi Cup competitions.

Shahrdari Astara promoted to the Azadegan League in the elimination stage of the League 2 in the 2019–20 season with a victory over the PAS Hamedan F.C.
