= Shahid Dastgerdi Stadium =

Stadium in Tehran, Iran

- PAS Stadium
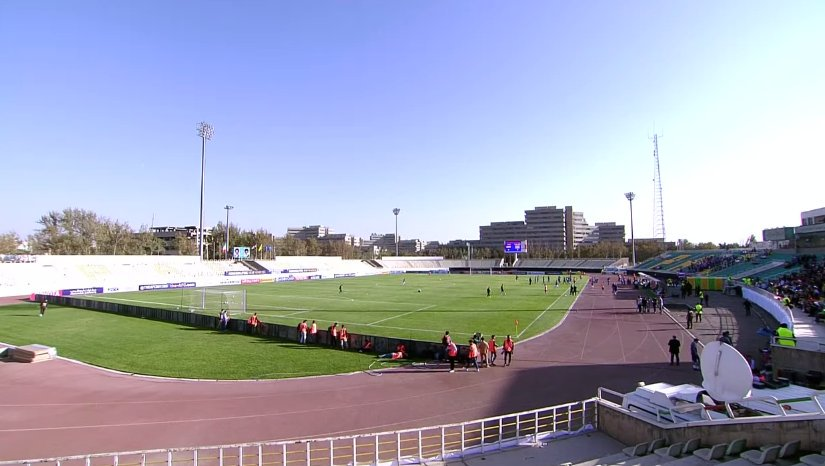
- Interactive map of Shahid Dastgerdi Stadium
- Full name: Shahid Dastgerdi Stadium
- Location: Ekbatan, Tehran, Iran
- Coordinates: 35.7077°N 51.3117°E
- Owner: Pas Tehran
- Operator: Pas Tehran
- Capacity: 8,250 (Football)
- Surface: Grass

Construction
- Built: 2002
- Opened: 2002

Tenants
- Pas (2002–2007); Saipa F.C. (2015–present); Paykan F.C. (2021–2022 and 2023–Present); Havadar S.C. (2021–Present)

The Shahid Dastgerdi Stadium (also known as PAS Tehran Stadium) (Persian: ورزشگاه شهيد دستگردی, Vârzeshgah-e Shihid Dâstgârdi) is a football stadium located in the Ekbatan area of Tehran, Iran. It was named after a casualty of the Iran–Iraq War. It is the former home of PAS Tehran F.C. and now hosts the Iran national under-20 football team.

== Famous matches ==
- The Shahid Dastgerdi Stadium was home to the 2005 Iranian Super Cup between Foolad and Saba Battery which ended 4-0 to Saba Battery.

== Tournaments ==
Shahid Dastgerdi Stadium along with Rah Ahan Stadium hosted the 2012 Asian under 16 Championship.Syria are playing their home matches at Shahid Dastgerdi Stadium during 2015 AFC Asian Cup qualification, due to security concerns while Iraq also played their home matches at Shahid Dastgerdi Stadium during 2018 FIFA World Cup qualification, due to security concerns. the Stadium also hosted AFC U-23 Championship qualification in 2016 and 2020.
