= 2024–25 Iran Football's 3rd Division =

Iran Football's 3rd Division
- Season: 2024–25
- Promoted: Aseman Golestan; Golchin Robat Karim; Setaregan Sorkh Asia; Rakhsh Khodro Tabriz; Malavan Bushehr; Shayan Dizel Fars

The article contains information about the 2024–25 Iran 3rd Division football season. This is the 4th rated football league in Iran after the Persian Gulf Cup, Azadegan League, and 2nd Division. This league had some changes in its structure compared to previous years. In fact, the new 3rd Division League will be limited to the Second Stage of the 3rd Division League in previous years. Also, the First Stage of the 3rd Division League in previous years will be known as the newly established 4th Division League from this season.

== Schedule ==
The schedule of the competition is as follows.

Week	Group 1	Group 2	Group 3
Week 1	4 November 2024	5 November 2024	6 November 2024
Week 2	10 November 2024	12 November 2024	13 November 2024
Week 3	18 November 2024	19 November 2024	20 November 2024
Week 4	25 November 2024	26 November 2024	26, 27 November 2024
Week 5	2 December 2024	2, 3 December 2024	3, 4 December 2024
Week 6	9 December 2024	10 December 2024	10, 11 December 2024
Week 7	16, 17 December 2024	16, 17 December 2024	17, 18 December 2024
Week 8	23, 24 December 2024	24 December 2024	24, 25 December 2024
Week 9	31 December 2024, 1 January 2025	1, 2 January 2025	1, 2 January 2025
Week 10	7 January 2025	8 January 2025	8, 9 January 2025
Week 11	14 January 2025	15, 16 January 2025	15, 16 January 2025
Week 12	5, 6 February 2025	6, 7 February 2025	6 February 2025
Week 13	12, 13 February 2025	12-14 February 2025	13, 14 February 2025
Week 14	19, 20 February 2025	20 February 2025	20, 21 February 2025
Week 15	26, 27 February 2025	26, 27 February 2025	27 February 2025
Week 16	5-7 March 2025	5-6 March 2025	6 March 2025
Week 17	11-14 March 2025	11, 13, 14 March 2025	13, 14 March 2025
Week 18	7 April 2025	7, 8 April 2025	8 April 2025
Week 19	15 April 2025	15-17 April 2025	17 April 2025
Week 20	23 April 2025	23-25 April 2025	26 April 2025
Week 21	29 April 2025	30 April 2025	2 May 2025
Week 22	6 May 2025	7 May 2025	10 May 2025

== Format ==
In this season, 4 relegated teams from 2nd division, joined to 32 remaining teams from Second Stage of previous season (total 36 teams). Teams were divided into 3 groups of 12 teams each and play a round-robin home and away matches. The promotion and relegation rules was announced as below: "The winner and runner-up of each group promoted to 2nd division. The 4 bottom clubs in each group will relegate to 4th division."

=== Teams ===
Relegated from 2nd Division (3 Teams):

- Atrak Bojnoord (Replaced by Setaregan Sorkh Asia)
- Kian Sam Babol
- Shahrdari Bam (Replaced by Alborz Bam)

Remaining Teams from last season (32 Teams):

- Mehr Khalij Tehran
- Parsian Tehran
- Shadkam Mashhad (Replaced by Avana Mashhad)
- Fard Alborz
- Aseman Golestan
- Khorshid Talayi Chaloos
- Montakhab Gharakhil
- Chala Sangsar
- Aramesh Khoshhal Mashhad (Replaced by Arman Bojnoord)
- Shariat Novin Mashhad
- Montakhab Gharakhil (Replaced by Academy Alireza Qaemshahr)
- Golchin Robat Karim
- Salehin Tehran
- Rakhsh Khodro Tabriz (Replaced by Shahin Dehdari Tabriz)
- Kheybar Novin Khoram Abad
- KIA Tehran (Replaced by Setareh Pirooz Iranian)
- Zist Sabz Tabriz
- San'at Naft Ilam
- Omid Taze Abad Chaf (Replaced by Sami Sport Langarud)
- Shahrdari (Ettehad) Fooman
- Abidar Sanandaj
- Malavan B Anzali (Replaced by Sahel Astaneh)
- Iranjavan Boushehr (Replaced by Palayesh Naft Abadan)
- Shayan Dizel Fars
- Iman Sabz Shiraz
- Ettehad Tayebi (Replaced by Zagros Mandegar Yasooj)
- Naft Omidiyeh
- Keshavarz Dezfool
- Mes Novin Kerman
- Harang Javan Bastak (Withdrew)
- Tam Boyer Ahmad (Replaced by Pars Gostar Shiraz)
- Malavan Mokran Sirjan (Replaced by Malavan Bushehr)

Free Slot (2 Teams):

- Aluminium B Arak
- Esteghlal Shoosh

=== Stadia and locations ===
Location of teams of the 2023–24 Iran 3rd Division second stage
Red: Group 1; Green: Group 2; Blue: Group 3.
Pink: Eliminated Teams.

== Tables and Results ==
=== Group 1 ===
Pos	Team	Pld	W	D	L	GF	GA	GD	Pts	Qualification or relegation
1	Aseman Golestan (Q)	22	13	4	5	35	16	+19	43	Promotion to 2025-26 Iran Football's 2nd Division
2	Golchin Robat Karim (Q)	22	11	7	4	26	16	+10	40	Promotion to 2025-26 Iran Football's 2nd Division
3	Parsian Tehran	22	11	6	5	27	16	+11	39	
4	Academy Alireza Qaemshahr	22	10	7	5	34	24	+10	37 (Note: Academy Alireza Qaemshahr and Shariat Novin Mashhad are tied on head-to-head results. Therefore they are ranked based on total goal difference.)	
5	Shariat Novin Mashhad	22	10	7	5	23	14	+9	37	
6	Kian Sam Babol	22	9	8	5	24	22	+2	35	
7	Avana Mashhad	22	10	4	8	34	19	+15	34 (Note: Avana Mashhad are ahead of Salehin Tehran based on head-to-head points: Avana: 6, Salehin: 0.)	
8	Salehin Tehran	22	10	4	8	30	18	+12	34	
9	Arman Bojnoord (R)	22	6	9	7	32	28	+4	27	Relegation to 2025-26 Iran Football's 4th Division
10	Pasargad Fard Alborz (R)	22	4	3	15	16	35	−19	15	Relegation to 2025-26 Iran Football's 4th Division
11	Khorshid Talayi Chaloos (R)	22	2	8	12	12	38	−26	14	Relegation to 2025-26 Iran Football's 4th Division
12	Chala Sangsar (R)	22	0	5	17	13	60	−47	5	Relegation to 2025-26 Iran Football's 4th Division

Updated to match(es) played on 6 May 2025. Source:
Rules for classification: 1) Points; 2) Head-to-head points; 3) Head-to-head goal difference; 4) Head-to-head goals scored; 5) Goal difference; 6) Goals scored; 7) Play-off at neutral venue.
(Note: Head-to-head record is used only after all the matches between the teams in question have been played).
Notes:

Home \ Away	A01	A02	A03	A04	A05	A06	A07	A08	A09	A10	A11	A12
Parsian Tehran	—	0–0	3–2	2–1	0–0	2–1	3–0 (Note: Khorshid Talayi Chaloos used an ineligible player and with the decision of the Disciplinary Committee, the game result was declared a 3–0 loss for them.)	3–1	1–1	1–0	2–2	0–0
Arman Bojnoord	0–1	—	2–1	2–2	0–0	1–2	0–0	3–2	1–1	1–1	2–1	3–1
Aseman Golestan	1–0	4–1	—	2–0	2–0	1–0	6–0	3–1	1–0	1–0	1–1	1–0
Chala Sangsar	0–3 (Note: Due to the host's failure to provide the conditions for holding the game, the disciplinary committee voted 3-0 in favor of the opponent.)	0–8	1–2	—	0–1	1–1	2–2	1–3	0–3	1–1	0–1	0–1
Kian Sam Babol	2–0	1–0	0–0	2–2	—	0–1	1–1	3–0 (Note: Pasargad Fard Alborz did not register on time and was declared a 3-0 loser by the Disciplinary Committee.)	2–0	2–1	0–4	2–1
Academy Alireza Qaemshahr	3–1	1–1	2–2	9–1	0–0	—	3–0 (Note: Khorshid Talayi Chaloos used an ineligible player and with the decision of the Disciplinary Committee, the game result was declared a 3–0 loss for them. The result before the vote was 2-2.)	2–0	1–1	1–0	1–0	1–1
Khorshid Talayi Chaloos	0–0	1–1	1–0	2–1	2–2	0–2	—	1–2	1–1	0–1	0–1	0–1
Pasargad Fard Alborz	0–1	1–3	0–2	1–0	1–1	1–2	2–0	—	0–1	0–3	0–1	0–1
Golchin Robat Karim	1–0	2–0	2–1	3–0	1–2	1–0	0–0	1–0	—	1–1	2–1	2–1
Salehin Tehran	0–3	3–1	1–1	4–0	3–1	2–0	3–0 (Note: While Khorshid Talayi Chaloos started the match with 7 players, due to an injury to one of the team's players in the 15th minute, the match remained unfinished, and according to the rules, its result is considered to be a three-goal difference greater than the result of the match at the time of the half-time break.)	2–0	2–0	—	1–2	1–0
Avana Mashhad	0–1	1–0	0–1	4–0 (Note: While Chala Sangsar started the match with 7 players, due to an injury to one of the team's players in the 15th minute, the match remained unfinished, and according to the rules, its result is considered to be a three-goal difference greater than the result of the match at the time of the half-time break.)	1–2	7–0	3–1	1–1	1–2	1–0	—	1–1
Shariat Novin Mashhad	1–0	2–2	1–0	3–0	2–0	1–1	3–0 (Note: Khorshid Talayi Chaloos did not show up at the field and was declared a 3-0 loser by the Disciplinary Committee.)	0–0	0–0	1–0	1–0	—

Updated to match(es) played on 6 May 2025. Source:
Legend: Blue = home team win; Yellow = draw; Red = away team win.

=== Group 2 ===
Pos	Team	Pld	W	D	L	GF	GA	GD	Pts	Qualification or relegation
1	Setaregan Sorkh Asia (Q)	22	14	6	2	30	14	+16	48	Promotion to 2025-26 Iran Football's 2nd Division
2	Rakhsh Khodro Tabriz (Q)	22	14	5	3	34	13	+21	47	Promotion to 2025-26 Iran Football's 2nd Division
3	San'at Naft Ilam	22	13	4	5	29	14	+15	43	
4	Kheybar Novin Khoram Abad	22	8	8	6	23	22	+1	32	
5	Shahin Dehdari Tabriz	22	8	7	7	27	27	0	31 (Note: Shahin Dehdari Tabriz are ahead of Mehr Khalij Tehran based on head-to-head points: Shahin Dehdari: 4, Mehr Khalij: 1.)	
6	Mehr Khalij Tehran	22	8	7	7	25	24	+1	31	
7	Abidar Sanandaj	22	7	8	7	31	24	+7	29	
8	Sahel Astaneh	22	5	11	6	16	14	+2	26	
9	Sami Sport Langarud (R)	22	5	8	9	18	27	−9	23	Relegation to 2025-26 Iran Football's 4th Division
10	Shahrdari (Ettehad) Fooman (R)	22	4	8	10	21	36	−15	20	Relegation to 2025-26 Iran Football's 4th Division
11	Setareh Pirooz Iranian (R)	22	3	4	15	13	32	−19	13 (Note: Setareh Pirooz Iranian are ahead of Keshavarz Dezfool based on head-to-head goal difference: Setareh Pirooz: +1, Keshavarz: -1.)	Relegation to 2025-26 Iran Football's 4th Division
12	Keshavarz Dezfool (R)	22	3	4	15	16	36	−20	13	Relegation to 2025-26 Iran Football's 4th Division

Updated to match(es) played on 7 May 2025. Source:
Rules for classification: 1) Points; 2) Head-to-head points; 3) Head-to-head goal difference; 4) Head-to-head goals scored; 5) Goal difference; 6) Goals scored; 7) Play-off at neutral venue.
(Note: Head-to-head record is used only after all the matches between the teams in question have been played).
Notes:

Home \ Away	B01	B02	B03	B04	B05	B06	B07	B08	B09	B10	B11	B12
Mehr Khalij Tehran	—	2–1	2–1	3–0	2–2	2–1	0–0	2–0	1–2	2–1	0–0	2–3
Abidar Sanandaj	3–0 (Note: Mehr Khalij Tehran did not appear at the field.)	—	0–2	2–1	0–1	2–0	1–1	6–1	0–0	1–1	2–2	2–1
San'at Naft Ilam	1–0	2–0	—	1–0	2–0	2–2	1–1	2–1	1–2	1–0	2–0	3–0 (Note: Shahin Dehdari Tabriz did not appear at the field.)
Keshavarz Dezfool	1–3	1–1	0–1	—	3–1	0–1	1–0	0–1	1–2	2–1	1–2	0–1
Ettehad Fooman	1–1	2–2	1–2	1–1	—	0–0	0–4	0–3 (Note: Ettehad Fooman did not register on time and was declared a 3-0 loser by the Disciplinary Committee.)	0–1	3–0 (Note: Setareh Pirooz Iranian did not appear at the field.)	0–1	2–0
Sami Sport Langarud	0–0	1–0	0–2	1–0	0–0	—	0–0	0–0	1–3	2–2	2–1	1–2
Sahel Astaneh	2–0	1–1	1–0	1–1	0–0	2–0	—	1–1	0–2	1–0	0–1	0–1
Kheybar Novin Khoram Abad	1–1	1–2	0–0	3–0	4–1	1–0	0–0	—	0–0	1–0	0–0	1–1
Setaregan Sorkh Asia	1–0	2–1	2–1	3–1	1–1	3–2	0–0	1–2	—	1–0	0–0	2–0
Setareh Pirooz Iranian	0–1	0–4	0–1	2–0	1–2	1–1	1–0	0–2	1–2	—	1–0	1–1
Rakhsh Khodro Tabriz	2–0	0–0	1–0	3–0 (Note: Keshavarz Dezfool did not appear at the field.)	4–1	3–1	3–1	2–0	1–0	3–0	—	2–0
Shahin Dehdari Tabriz	1–1	2–0	1–1	2–2	4–2	1–2	0–0	3–0	0–0	1–0	2–3	—

Updated to match(es) played on 7 May 2025. Source:
Legend: Blue = home team win; Yellow = draw; Red = away team win.

=== Group 3 ===
Pos	Team	Pld	W	D	L	GF	GA	GD	Pts	Qualification or relegation
1	Malavan Bushehr (Q)	22	12	6	4	29	17	+12	42	Promotion to 2025-26 Iran Football's 2nd Division
2	Shayan Dizel Fars (Q)	22	10	9	3	24	10	+14	39 (Note: Shayan Dizel Fars are ahead of Zagros Mandegar Yasooj based on head-to-head points: Shayan Dizel: 4, Zagros Mandegar: 1.)	Promotion to 2025-26 Iran Football's 2nd Division
3	Zagros Mandegar Yasooj	22	12	3	7	27	17	+10	39	
4	Aluminium B Arak	22	8	8	6	20	20	0	32	
5	Naft o Gaz Zagros	22	8	7	7	23	17	+6	31	
6	Naft Omidiyeh	22	7	6	9	22	26	−4	27 (Note: Naft Omidiyeh Iranian and Iman Sabz Shiraz are tied on head-to-head results. Therefore they are ranked based on total goal difference)	
7	Iman Sabz Shiraz	22	6	9	7	17	24	−7	27	
8	Pars Gostar Shiraz	22	7	5	10	16	21	−5	26 (Note: Pars Gostar Shiraz are ahead of Esteghlal Shoosh based on head-to-head points: Pars Gostar: 4, Esteghlal Shoosh: 1.)	
9	Esteghlal Shoosh (R)	22	6	8	8	23	24	−1	26	Relegation to 2025-26 Iran Football's 4th Division
10	Palayesh Naft Abadan (R)	22	6	7	9	17	19	−2	25	Relegation to 2025-26 Iran Football's 4th Division
11	Shahrdari Bam (R)	22	7	3	12	18	29	−11	24	Relegation to 2025-26 Iran Football's 4th Division
12	Mes Novin Kerman (R)	22	3	9	10	11	23	−12	18	Relegation to 2025-26 Iran Football's 4th Division

Updated to match(es) played on 10 May 2025. Source:
Rules for classification: 1) Points; 2) Head-to-head points; 3) Head-to-head goal difference; 4) Head-to-head goals scored; 5) Goal difference; 6) Goals scored; 7) Play-off at neutral venue.
(Note: Head-to-head record is used only after all the matches between the teams in question have been played).
Notes:

Home \ Away	C01	C02	C03	C04	C05	C06	C07	C08	C09	C10	C11	C12
Naft o Gaz Zagros	—	0–0	0–1	1–0	3–0	1–1	1–0	2–1	0–0	3–0	1–0	2–0
Naft Omidiyeh	2–1	—	0–1	0–3 (Note: Naft Omidiyeh used an ineligible player and with the decision of the Disciplinary Committee, the game result was declared a 3–0 loss for them. The result before the vote was 1-0.)	1–0	1–1	0–1	1–1	2–1	2–1	2–0	2–1
Esteghlal Shoosh	1–1	3–1	—	0–0	1–1	1–1	2–0	1–2	2–0	1–1	1–1	4–0
Shayan Dizel Fars	3–2	0–0	1–0	—	1–0	1–0	3–1	1–1	3–0	1–1	1–1	1–0
Palayesh Naft Abadan	0–1	0–0	3–1	1–1	—	1–0	1–0	0–0	3–0	1–0	0–0	1–1
Malavan Bushehr	0–0	4–3	2–1	1–0	2–1	—	1–0	1–0	1–1	3–0 (Note: The game was underway until the 78th minute with a score of 2-1 in favor of Malavan Bushehr, when it was interrupted due to incidents and the referees leaving the field. Then, the disciplinary committee announced the score as 3-0 in favor of Malavan Bushehr.)	3–0	3–1
Zagros Mandegar Yasooj	1–0	3–2	1–0	0–0	1–0	1–2	—	3–0 (Note: After the incident, members of the Aluminum B Arak team left the field in the middle of the first half. The disciplinary committee then announced the result as 3-0 in favor of Zagros Mandegar Yasuj.)	1–1	1–0	4–0	2–1
Aluminium B Arak	2–1	1–0	1–0	0–0	2–1	2–0	2–1	—	1–1	0–0	1–0	1–1
Iman Sabz Shiraz	0–0	1–0	2–2	0–3 (Note: Iman Sabz Shiraz did not register on time and was declared a 3-0 loser by the Disciplinary Committee.)	0–0	1–0	0–1	1–1	—	3–1	1–1	1–0
Pars Gostar Shiraz	1–0	1–1	3–0 (Note: Esteghlal Shoosh did not appear at the field.)	0–0	2–0	0–1	0–1	1–0	2–1	—	1–0	1–0
Mes Novin Kerman	2–2	0–1	0–0	0–1	1–0	1–1	1–1	2–0	0–1	1–0	—	0–0
Shahrdari Bam	2–1	2–1	2–0	1–0	1–3	0–1	0–3	2–1	0–1	1–0	1–0	—

Updated to match(es) played on 10 May 2025. Source:
Legend: Blue = home team win; Yellow = draw; Red = away team win.

=== Ranking of nine-placed teams ===
Pos	Grp	Team	Pld	W	D	L	GF	GA	GD	Pts	Qualification or relegation
1	A	Arman Bojnoord	22	6	9	7	32	28	+4	27	Remained in 3rd Division 2025–26 after relegation (Note: All ninth-placed teams should relegate to 4th Division. But due to elimination of Shahr Raz Shiraz, the two best ninth-placed teams, remained in 3rd Division and not relegated.)
2	C	Esteghlal Shoosh	22	6	8	8	23	24	−1	26	Remained in 3rd Division 2025–26 after relegation
3	B	Sami Sport Langarud	22	5	8	9	18	27	−9	23	Relegation to 4th Division 2025–26

Rules for classification: 1) Points; 2) Goal difference; 3) Goals scored; 4) Play-off at neutral venue.

== See also ==
- 2024–25 Persian Gulf Pro League
- 2024–25 Azadegan League
- 2024–25 2nd Division
- 2024–25 4th Division
- 2024–25 Hazfi Cup
- 2024 Iranian Super Cup
