= 2020–21 Iran Football's 3rd Division =

Iran Football's 3rd Division
- Season: 2020–21
- Promoted: Shahrdari Noshahr; Shahid Oraki Eslamshahr; Van Pars Naghsh-e-Jahan; Shohadaye Razakan Karaj
- Matches played: 653
- Goals scored: 1,587 (2.43 per match)
- Biggest home win: Sohan Mohammad Qom 13-1 Kia Pars Tehran
- Biggest away win: Damavand Amol 1-8 Moghavemat Tehran

The article contains information about the 2020–21 Iran 3rd Division football season. This is the 4th rated football league in Iran after the Persian Gulf Cup, Azadegan League, and 2nd Division. The league started on 5 December 2020.

In total 85 teams (65 teams in the first stage in 5 groups, 20 teams in second stage) competed in this season's competitions.

The challenges caused by COVID-19 pandemic in Iran made some calendar changes in previous season's final matches. Therefore, this season started later than usual time.

== First stage ==
The top 2 teams from each group advance to the Second Stage. The teams ranked 3rd, 4th and 5th in each group (total 15 teams) are eligible to play in the First Round of next season. The teams ranked 6th and lower relegate to Provincial Leagues.

=== Qualified teams ===
Teams which are eligible to play in this round are as follows:

Relegated from 2nd Division (1 team):

- Karoon Arvand Khoramshahr (Replaced by Esteghlal Danial Shoosh)

Relegated from 3rd Division – 2nd Stage (6 teams):

- Kian Tehran (Replaced by Kian Arak)
- Damavand Amol (Replaced by Shahid Bagheri Goyom Fars)
- Khalij Fars Minab
- Negin Sanabad Mashhad (Replaced by Aseman Mashhad)
- Setareh Sorkh Kashan
- Esteghlal Ahvaz

Remaining from 3rd Division – 1st Stage (18 teams):

- Abi Delan Boneh Gaz (Replaced by Khalij Fars Mahshahr)
- Bargh Ara Alborz (Replaced by Shahr Ahan Khaf)
- Darya Babol (Replaced by Kia Academy Tehran)
- Darya Harbadeye Mahmoudabad
- Farhang Karaj (Replaced by Mardan Pasha Karaj)
- Foolad Hormozgan
- Hermas Fateh Shiran Tabriz (Replaced by Setaregan Azhand Azerbaijan)
- Kavian Naghadeh
- Naft Iranian Tehran
- Oghab Shiraz
- Perspolis Dezfool
- Rezvani Esfahan
- Roz Mooket Boroujen
- Sanat Foolad Koohestan Esfahan
- Setare Caspian Babol (Replaced by Shahrvand Noor)
- Shahid Oraki Eslamshahr
- Shahrdari Fereydoonkenar
- Shahrvand Ramsar

Promoted from Provincial Leagues (34 teams):

- Setaregan Simorgh Alborz (Alborz)
- Shahrdari Bilehsavar (Ardebil)
- Kanyav Oshnavieh (Azarbayejan Gharbi)
- Oghab Tabriz (Azarbayejan Sharghi)
- Piroozi Begin Khoormooj (Boushehr)
- Shahin Lordegan (Chaharmahal & Bakhtiyari)
- Stock Marvdasht (Fars)
- Sardar Jangal Gourab (Gilan)
- Esteghlal Aliabad (Golestan)
- Keshavarz Nahavand (Hamedan)
- Harang Javan Bastak (Hormozgan)
- Shohadaye Chavar 65 (Ilam)
- Van Pars Naghsh-e-Jahan (Isfahan)
- Omid Avaran Kerman (Kerman)
- Setaregan Kermanshah (Kermanshah)
- Badamak Qaen (Khorasan Jonoubi)
- Shariat Novin Mashhad(Khorasan Razavi)
- Payam Entezar Bojnourd (Khorasan Shomali)
- Farhang Ramhormoz (Khouzestan)
- Esteghlal Kish (Kish)
- Shohadaye Il Bahmaei (Kohgiluye & Boyer Ahmad)
- Shohadaye Garous Bijar (Kordestan)
- Shahrdari Boroujerd (Lorestan)
- Aluminium Pars Saveh (Markazi)
- Moghavemat Jooybar (Mazandaran)
- Safir Novin Abyek (Qazvin)
- Sohan Mohammad Qom (Qom)
- Siman Shahrood (Semnan)
- Shahin Zahedan (Sistan & Balouchestan)
- Shahin Tehran (Tehran)
- Damash Parseh Tehran (Tehran's runner-up)
- Kia Pars Tehran (Tehran Suburbs)
- Sang Ahan Bafgh (Yazd)
- Arya Minoo Khorramdareh (Zanjan)

Free slots (6 teams):

- Khorshid Mehr Ghorveh
- Moghavemat Tehran
- Nikan Tehran
- Pardis Khorramabad
- Perspolis Borazjan
- Zobahan Ardebil

=== Group A ===
Pos	Team	Pld	W	D	L	GF	GA	GD	Pts	Qualification or relegation
1	Moghavemat Tehran	12	8	1	3	25	10	+15	25	Promotion to Second Stage
2	Kian Arak	12	8	1	3	19	9	+10	25	Promotion to Second Stage
3	Damash Parseh Tehran	12	7	3	2	22	7	+15	24	
4	Shariat Novin Mashhad	12	7	3	2	22	10	+12	24	
5	Darya Harabdeh Mahmoudabad	12	6	3	3	0	12	−12	21	
6	Esteghlal Aliabad	12	6	3	3	19	14	+5	21	Relegation to Provincial Leagues 2021–22
7	Siman Shahrood	12	5	3	4	15	9	+6	18	Relegation to Provincial Leagues 2021–22
8	Aseman Mashhad	12	5	2	5	14	16	−2	17	Relegation to Provincial Leagues 2021–22
9	Moghavemat Jooybar	12	4	4	4	16	10	+6	16	Relegation to Provincial Leagues 2021–22
10	Shahrvand Noor	12	3	4	5	0	14	−14	13	Relegation to Provincial Leagues 2021–22
11	Payam Entezar Bojnourd	12	1	3	8	8	29	−21	6	Relegation to Provincial Leagues 2021–22
12	Badamak Qaen	12	1	2	9	7	23	−16	5	Relegation to Provincial Leagues 2021–22
13	Shahr Ahan Khaf	12	1	0	11	2	36	−34	3	Relegation to Provincial Leagues 2021–22

Updated to match(es) played on 28 March 2021. Source:
Rules for classification: 1) points; 2) goal difference; 3) number of goals scored.

=== Group B ===
Pos	Team	Pld	W	D	L	GF	GA	GD	Pts	Qualification or relegation
1	Mardan Pasha Karaj	12	7	2	3	16	8	+8	23	Promotion to Second Stage
2	Shahid Oraki Eslamshahr	12	5	6	1	15	7	+8	21	Promotion to Second Stage
3	Sohan Mohammad Qom	12	6	1	5	25	14	+11	19	
4	Setaregan Simorgh Alborz	12	5	4	3	18	9	+9	19	
5	Arya Minoo Khorramdareh	12	5	4	3	18	15	+3	19	
6	Shahrvand Ramsar	12	6	1	5	11	11	0	19	Relegation to Provincial Leagues 2021–22
7	Shahin Tehran	12	5	3	4	15	11	+4	18	Relegation to Provincial Leagues 2021–22
8	Sardar Jangal Gourab	12	5	3	4	13	10	+3	18	Relegation to Provincial Leagues 2021–22
9	Aluminium Pars Saveh	12	4	3	5	11	12	−1	15	Relegation to Provincial Leagues 2021–22
10	Shahrdari Fereydoonkenar	12	3	4	5	10	14	−4	13	Relegation to Provincial Leagues 2021–22
11	Kia Pars Tehran	12	2	5	5	10	25	−15	11	Relegation to Provincial Leagues 2021–22
12	Solduz Naghadeh	12	2	4	6	12	18	−6	10	Relegation to Provincial Leagues 2021–22
13	Safir Novin Abyek	12	2	2	8	12	32	−20	8	Relegation to Provincial Leagues 2021–22

Updated to match(es) played on 18 March 2021. Source:
Rules for classification: 1) points; 2) goal difference; 3) number of goals scored.

=== Group C ===
Pos	Team	Pld	W	D	L	GF	GA	GD	Pts	Qualification or relegation
1	Naft Iranian Tehran	12	9	2	1	20	5	+15	29	Promotion to Second Stage
2	Kanyav Oshnavieh	12	7	4	1	17	6	+11	25	Promotion to Second Stage
3	Shohadaye Garous Bijar	12	8	1	3	17	14	+3	25	
4	Keshavarz Nahavand	12	7	2	3	26	10	+16	23	
5	Kavian Naghadeh	12	6	4	2	16	10	+6	22	
6	Nikan Mehr Tehran	12	5	3	4	17	13	+4	18	Relegation to Provincial Leagues 2021–22
7	Setaregan Azhand Azerbaijan	12	5	2	5	12	9	+3	17	Relegation to Provincial Leagues 2021–22
8	KIA Football Academy	12	4	5	3	17	17	0	17	Relegation to Provincial Leagues 2021–22
9	Shahrdari Bilehsavar	12	4	1	7	15	25	−10	13	Relegation to Provincial Leagues 2021–22
10	Ohadi Maragheh	12	3	2	7	18	27	−9	11	Relegation to Provincial Leagues 2021–22
11	Oghab Tabriz	12	2	2	8	9	25	−16	8	Relegation to Provincial Leagues 2021–22
12	Khorshid Mehr Ghorveh	12	1	3	8	6	16	−10	6	Relegation to Provincial Leagues 2021–22
13	Zobahan Ardebil	12	1	1	10	5	18	−13	4	Relegation to Provincial Leagues 2021–22

Updated to match(es) played on 18 March 2021. Source:
Rules for classification: 1) points; 2) goal difference; 3) number of goals scored.

=== Group D ===
Pos	Team	Pld	W	D	L	GF	GA	GD	Pts	Qualification or relegation
1	Farhang Ramhormoz	12	7	3	2	20	10	+10	24	Promotion to Second Stage
2	Khalij Fars Mahshahr	12	6	5	1	24	6	+18	23	Promotion to Second Stage
3	Perspolis Borazjan	12	6	3	3	20	12	+8	21	
4	Piroozi Negin Khoormooj	12	5	5	2	10	5	+5	20	
5	Pardis Khorramabad	12	5	4	3	16	12	+4	19	
6	Shahrdari Boroujerd	12	5	3	4	16	13	+3	18	Relegation to Provincial Leagues 2021–22
7	Setaregan Kermanshah	12	5	2	5	16	19	−3	17	Relegation to Provincial Leagues 2021–22
8	Shahin Lordegan	12	5	2	5	15	21	−6	17	Relegation to Provincial Leagues 2021–22
9	Perspolis Dezfool	12	4	4	4	16	10	+6	16	Relegation to Provincial Leagues 2021–22
10	Pouya Shoosh	12	3	3	6	14	18	−4	12	Relegation to Provincial Leagues 2021–22
11	Shohadaye Il Bahmaei	12	3	3	6	10	26	−16	12	Relegation to Provincial Leagues 2021–22
12	Shohadaye Chavar 65	12	3	2	7	5	15	−10	11	Relegation to Provincial Leagues 2021–22
13	Roz Mooket Boroujen	12	0	3	9	6	21	−15	3	Relegation to Provincial Leagues 2021–22

Updated to match(es) played on 18 March 2021. Source:
Rules for classification: 1) points; 2) goal difference; 3) number of goals scored.

=== Group E ===
Pos	Team	Pld	W	D	L	GF	GA	GD	Pts	Qualification or relegation
1	Van Pars Naghsh-e-Jahan	11	7	2	2	22	8	+14	23	Promotion to Second Stage
2	Khalij Fars Minab	11	7	1	3	16	10	+6	22	Promotion to Second Stage
3	Oghab Shiraz	11	6	2	3	14	8	+6	20	
4	Foolad Hormozgan	11	5	4	2	19	7	+12	19	
5	Shahid Bagheri Goyom Fars	11	6	1	4	13	9	+4	19	
6	Stock Marvdasht	11	5	3	3	12	8	+4	18	Relegation to Provincial Leagues 2021–22
7	Sanat Foolad Koohestan Esfahan	11	5	2	4	16	19	−3	17	Relegation to Provincial Leagues 2021–22
8	Harang Javan Bastak	11	4	3	4	15	13	+2	15	Relegation to Provincial Leagues 2021–22
9	Sang Ahan Bafgh	11	3	3	5	16	17	−1	12	Relegation to Provincial Leagues 2021–22
10	Omid Avaran Kerman	11	3	3	5	10	11	−1	12	Relegation to Provincial Leagues 2021–22
11	Esteghlal Kish	11	1	1	9	7	27	−20	4	Relegation to Provincial 2nd Division 2021–22
12	Rezvani Esfahan	11	0	3	8	2	25	−23	3	Relegation to Provincial 2nd Division 2021–22
13	Shahin Zahedan	0	0	0	0	0	0	0	0	Relegation to Provincial 2nd Division 2021–22

Updated to match(es) played on 18 March 2021. Source:
Rules for classification: 1) points; 2) goal difference; 3) number of goals scored.

== Second stage ==
Second Stage started in April 2021 and finished on August 10, 2021.

=== Qualified teams ===
Relegated from 2nd Division (3 teams):

- Shahrdari Fooman
- Besat Kermanshah
- Shohadaye Razakan Karaj

Remaining teams from last season (17 teams):

- 04 Birjand (Replaced by Omid Vahdat Birjand)
- Bargh 3 Faz Shiraz (Replaced by Iman Sabz Shiraz)
- Boyer Ahmad Yasouj (Replaced by Benyamin Varzesh Tehran)
- Esteghlal Shoosh
- Farhang Isar Astara
- Mohajer Novin Mashhad
- Parag Tehran
- PAS Gilan
- Pishgaman Fonoon Pars Tehran
- Javan Novin Sari
- Sepahan Novin Isfahan
- Sepahan Novin Izeh
- Shahid Molayi Ghaemshahr (Replaced by Damavand Amol)
- Shahrdari Noshahr
- Tazan Tehran (Replaced by Artam Tabriz)
- Yazd Looleh
- Zolfaghar Kashan (Replaced by Sanat Abrisham Isfahan)

Promoted from 1st Stage (10 teams):

- Moghavemat Tehran
- Mardan Pasha Karaj
- Naft Iranian Tehran
- Farhang Ramhormoz
- Van Pars Naghsh-e-Jahan
- Kian Arak
- Shahid Oraki Eslamshahr
- Kanyav Oshnavieh
- Khalij Fars Mahshahr
- Khalij Fars Minab

=== Group 1 ===
Pos	Team	Pld	W	D	L	GF	GA	GD	Pts	Qualification or relegation
1	Shahrdari Noshahr	18	11	5	2	30	11	+19	38	Promotion to 2021-22 Iran Football's 2nd Division
2	Omid Vahdat Birjand	18	9	6	3	28	15	+13	33	Promotion to Play-off
3	Shohadaye Razakan Karaj	18	10	3	5	27	16	+11	33	Promotion to Play-off
4	Mardan Pasha Karaj	18	7	5	6	14	14	0	26	
5	Moghavemat Tehran	18	7	4	7	35	24	+11	25	
6	Javan Novin Sari	18	6	7	5	22	14	+8	25	
7	Mohajer Novin Mashhad	18	7	4	7	21	19	+2	25	
8	Pishgaman Fonoon Pars	18	6	5	7	18	22	−4	23	Relegation to 3rd Division - 1st Stage 2021–22
9	Parag Tehran	18	2	5	11	13	38	−25	11	Relegation to 3rd Division - 1st Stage 2021–22
10	Damavand Amol	18	1	4	13	10	45	−35	7	Relegation to 3rd Division - 1st Stage 2021–22

Updated to match(es) played on 10 August 2021. Source:
Rules for classification: 1) points; 2) goal difference; 3) number of goals scored.

=== Group 2 ===
Pos	Team	Pld	W	D	L	GF	GA	GD	Pts	Qualification or relegation
1	Shahid Oraki Eslamshahr	18	10	4	4	24	15	+9	34	Promotion to 2021-22 Iran Football's 2nd Division
2	Artam Tabriz	18	6	11	1	18	12	+6	29	Promotion to Play-off
3	Naft Iranian Tehran	18	8	5	5	22	18	+4	29	
4	Shahrdari Fooman	18	8	4	6	20	19	+1	28	
5	Besat Kermanshah	18	7	5	6	21	18	+3	26	
6	Kian Arak	18	6	7	5	25	24	+1	25	
7	Benyamin Varzesh Tehran	18	7	1	10	24	27	−3	22	
8	Kanyav Oshnavieh	18	6	4	8	20	24	−4	22	Relegation to 3rd Division - 1st Stage 2021–22
9	Farhang Isar Astara	18	5	3	10	14	19	−5	18	Relegation to 3rd Division - 1st Stage 2021–22
10	PAS Gilan	18	3	4	11	13	25	−12	13	Relegation to 3rd Division - 1st Stage 2021–22

Updated to match(es) played on 10 August 2021. Source:
Rules for classification: 1) points; 2) goal difference; 3) number of goals scored.

=== Group 3 ===
Pos	Team	Pld	W	D	L	GF	GA	GD	Pts	Qualification or relegation
1	Van Pars Naghsh-e-Jahan	18	11	3	4	27	16	+11	36	Promotion to 2021-22 Iran Football's 2nd Division
2	Khalij Fars Mahshahr	18	10	5	3	30	15	+15	35	Promotion to Play-off
3	Sepahan Novin Isfahan	18	9	4	5	37	21	+16	31	
4	Iman Sabz Shiraz	18	7	7	4	21	21	0	28	
5	Sepahan Novin Izeh	18	6	6	6	13	19	−6	24	
6	Farhang Ramhormoz	18	5	6	7	24	37	−13	21	
7	Esteghlal Shoosh	18	4	7	7	20	20	0	19	Relegation to 3rd Division - 1st Stage 2021–22
8	Sanat Abrisham Isfahan	18	6	0	12	18	31	−13	18	Relegation to 3rd Division - 1st Stage 2021–22
9	Yazd Looleh	18	4	5	9	19	20	−1	17	Relegation to 3rd Division - 1st Stage 2021–22
10	Khalij Fars Minab	18	4	5	9	19	28	−9	17	Relegation to 3rd Division - 1st Stage 2021–22

Updated to match(es) played on 10 August 2021. Source:
Rules for classification: 1) points; 2) goal difference; 3) number of goals scored.

=== Ranking of third-placed teams ===
Pos	Team	Pld	W	D	L	GF	GA	GD	Pts	Qualification or relegation
1	Shohadaye Razakan Karaj	18	10	3	5	27	16	+11	33	Promotion to Play-off
2	Sepahan Novin Isfahan	18	9	4	5	37	21	+16	31	
3	Naft Iranian Tehran	18	8	5	5	22	18	+4	29	

Updated to match(es) played on 10 August 2021. Source:
Rules for classification: 1) points; 2) goal difference; 3) number of goals scored; 4) play-off at neutral venue.

=== Ranking of seventh-placed teams ===
Pos	Team	Pld	W	D	L	GF	GA	GD	Pts	Qualification or relegation
1	Mohajer Novin Mashhad	18	7	4	7	21	19	+2	25	
2	Benyamin Varzesh Tehran	18	7	1	10	24	27	−3	22	
3	Esteghlal Shoosh	18	4	7	7	20	20	0	19	Relegation to 3rd Division - 1st Stage 2021–22

Updated to match(es) played on 10 August 2021. Source:
Rules for classification: 1) points; 2) goal difference; 3) number of goals scored; 4) play-off at neutral venue.

== Play-offs ==
The draw of the play-off round held on August 14, 2021, between following teams.

=== Qualified teams ===
2nd placed teams in Second Stage (3 teams):

- Omid Vahdat Birjand
- Artam Tabriz
- Khalij Fars Mahshahr

Best 3rd placed team in Second Stage (1 team):

- Shohadaye Razakan Karaj

=== First round ===
Team 1	Score	Team 2	1st leg	2nd leg	Notes
Khalij Fars Mahshahr	0-1	Omid Vahdat Birjand	0-0	0-1	
Shohadaye Razakan Karaj	4-3	Artam Tabriz	1-1	3-2	

22 August 2021
20:30

Khalij Fars Mahshahr	0-0	Omid Vahdat Birjand

Shohada, Mahshahr
Attendance: 0
Referee: Mojtaba Afra
28 August 2021
18:30

Omid Vahdat Birjand	1-0	Khalij Fars Mahshahr
Mehdi Khaghani

Azadi, Birjand
Attendance: 0

Omid Vahdat Birjand won 1–0 on aggregate and promoted to second play-off round.

22 August 2021
20:30

Shohadaye Razakan Karaj	1-1	Artam Tabriz
Ali Fathi		Ali Ashraf

Enghelab, Karaj
Attendance: 0
Referee: Farhad Ghasemi
28 August 2021
18:30

Artam Tabriz	2-3	Shohadaye Razakan Karaj

Shahrdari, Tabriz
Attendance: 0

Shohadaye Razakan Karaj won 4–3 on aggregate and promoted to second play-off round.

=== Second round ===
Team 1	Score	Team 2	1st leg	2nd leg	Notes
Shohadaye Razakan Karaj	3-0	Omid Vahdat Birjand	1-0	2-0	

2 September 2021
18:00

Shohadaye Razakan Karaj	1-0	Omid Vahdat Birjand
Behnam Asgarkhani

Enghelab, Karaj
Attendance: 0
7 September 2021
18:15

Omid Vahdat Birjand	0-2	Shohadaye Razakan Karaj

Samen, Mashad
Attendance: 0

Shohadaye Razakan Karaj won 3–0 on aggregate and promoted to 2021-22 Iran Football's 2nd Division.
