= 2022–23 Iran Football's 3rd Division =

Iran Football's 3rd Division
- Season: 2022–23
- Champions: Samit Tehran; Kavir Moghava Tehran; Shenavarsazi Jam Vatan Qeshm
- Promoted: Samit Tehran; Kavir Moghava Tehran; Shenavarsazi Jam Vatan Qeshm; Sorkhpooshan Novin Pakdasht
- Relegated: 40 teams from 1st stage

The article contains information about the 2022–23 Iran 3rd Division football season. This is the 4th rated football league in Iran after the Persian Gulf Cup, Azadegan League, and 2nd Division. The league has been started on 29 October 2022 and finished on 1 September 2023.

In total 85 teams (65 teams in the first stage in 5 groups, 20 teams added in second stage) will compete in this season's competitions.

== Schedule ==
The schedule of the competition is as follows.

Stage	Draw date	Week	Matches dates
First stage	4 October 2023	Week 1	29-31 October 2022
First stage	4 October 2023	Week 2	4-7 November 2022
First stage	4 October 2023	Week 3	11-15 November 2022
First stage	4 October 2023	Week 4	17-21 November 2022
First stage	4 October 2023	Week 5	30 November, 1 December 2022
First stage	4 October 2023	Week 6	16 November 2022
First stage	4 October 2023	Week 7	6-7 December 2022
First stage	4 October 2023	Week 8	14-15 December 2022
First stage	4 October 2023	Week 9	24-26 December 2022
First stage	4 October 2023	Week 10	1-2 January 2023
First stage	4 October 2023	Week 11	8-9 January 2023
First stage	4 October 2023	Week 12	31 January, 1, 9, 12, 19 February 2023
First stage	4 October 2023	Week 13	7-8, 15, 19, 25 February 2023
Second Stage	7 March 2023	Week 1	6-8 April 2023
Second Stage	7 March 2023	Week 2	15-16 April 2023
Second Stage	7 March 2023	Week 3	22-23 April 2023
Second Stage	7 March 2023	Week 4	28-29 April 2023
Second Stage	7 March 2023	Week 5	4-5 May 2023
Second Stage	7 March 2023	Week 6	9-10 May 2023
Second Stage	7 March 2023	Week 7	15-17 May 2023
Second Stage	7 March 2023	Week 8	21-23 May 2023
Second Stage	7 March 2023	Week 9	27-28 May 2023
Second Stage	7 March 2023	Week 10	8-9 June 2023
Second Stage	7 March 2023	Week 11	14-15 June 2023
Second Stage	7 March 2023	Week 12	19-20, 22 June 2023
Second Stage	7 March 2023	Week 13	25, 28 June 2023
Second Stage	7 March 2023	Week 14	30 June, 4 July 2023
Second Stage	7 March 2023	Week 15	7, 10 July 2023
Second Stage	7 March 2023	Week 16	13-14, 16 July 2023
Second Stage	7 March 2023	Week 17	22 July 2023
Second Stage	7 March 2023	Week 18	31 July 2023
Play-off Stage	12 August 2023	Round 1	17 August 2023
Play-off Stage	12 August 2023	Round 1	22 August 2023
Play-off Stage	12 August 2023	Round 2	27 August 2023
Play-off Stage	12 August 2023	Round 2	1 September 2023

== First stage ==
The top 2 teams from each group advance to the Second Stage. The teams ranked 3rd, 4th and 5th in each group (total 15 teams) are eligible to play in the First Round of next season. The teams ranked 6th and lower relegate to Provincial Leagues.

=== Qualified teams ===
Teams which are eligible to play in this round are as follows:

Relegated from 2nd Division (1 Team):

- Gol Reyhan Alborz (Replaced by Shahin Gorji Mahale Behshahr)

Relegated from 3rd Division – 2nd Stage (9 Teams):

- Moghavemat Tehran
- Artam Tabriz (Replaced by Misagh El Tan Urmia)
- Naft o Gaz Gachsaran
- Darya Babol (Replaced by Taghdis Mazandaran)
- Alavi Khoramdareh (Replaced by Kosar Mehr Eslamshahr)
- Esteghlal Shoosh
- Javan Novin Sari
- Sardar Bukan (Replaced by Fanavaran Pishro Ardabil)
- Farhang Ramhormoz

Remaining from 3rd Division – 1st Stage (15 Teams):

- Yaran Hadi Norouzi
- Arian sepand Tehran
- Shariat Novin Mashhad
- Vahdat Aghasht
- Setaregan Sorkh Tehran
- Pas Gilan
- Pishgaman Fonoon Pars
- Zist Sabz Tabriz
- Malavan B Anzali
- Perspolis Borazjan
- Khorram Kesht Aflak Khorramabad
- Yadavaran Dokoohe Andimeshk
- Harang Javan Bastak
- Taraz Chadegan
- Shayan Dizel Fars

Promoted from Provincial Leagues (34 Teams):

- Shahrdari Karaj (Alborz)
- Mi'ad Moghan Parsabad (Ardebil)
- Orum Spur Urmia (Azarbayejan Gharbi)
- Oghab Tabriz (Azarbayejan Sharghi)
- Sorkhdelan Parseh Deyr (Boushehr)
- Parsian Harooni (Chaharmahal & Bakhtiyari)
- Montakhab Kazroon (Fars)
- Almas Tazeabad Chaf (Gilan)
- Shahrdari Gonbad (Golestan)
- Sardar Zand Malayer (Hamedan)
- Motahed Moezabad Roudan (Hormozgan)
- Kosar Mehran (Ilam)
- Payam Zeydi Kashan (Isfahan)
- Shahrdari Barvat Bam (Kerman)
- Shohadaye Bazi Deraz (Kermanshah)
- Bentonit Sepahan Esfahak Tabas (Khorasan Jonoubi)
- Nader Mashhad (Khorasan Razavi)
- Esteghlal Novin Bojnoord (Khorasan Shomali)
- Poolad Oxin Izeh (Khouzestan)
- Sorkhpooshan Kish (Kish)
- Etehad Ghale-Raeisi (Kohgiluye & Boyer Ahmad)
- Shahrdari Baneh (Kordestan)
- (Lorestan) Lorestan didn't submit any teams as Province Champion
- Artiman Hefdah Iranian Khomein (Markazi)
- Shahrdari Ghaemshahr (Mazandaran)
- Samit No Qazvon (Qazvin)
- Omid Hasanabad Qom (Qom)
- Kia Shahrood (Semnan)
- Khalij Chabahar (Sistan & Balouchestan)
- Damash Parseh Tehran (Tehran)
- Pouya Deylam Aria Kia (Tehran's runner-up)
- Sorkhpooshan Novin Pakdasht (Tehran Suburbs)
- Mirak Kish Mehriz (Yazd) (Replaced by Perspolis Shiraz)
- Forooshgah Varzeshi Ali Gheydar (Zanjan)

Free slots (6 teams):

- Esteghlal Jonoob Tehran
- Padma Yadak Isfahan
- Aboozar Basht
- Parsa Baghmalek
- Vahdat Roodbar
- Zagros Dehloran

=== Group A ===
Pos	Team	Pld	W	D	L	GF	GA	GD	Pts	Qualification or relegation
1	Shariat Novin Mashhad	12	8	3	1	17	4	+13	27	Promotion to Second Stage
2	Setaregan Sorkh Tehran	12	7	3	2	19	11	+8	24	Promotion to Second Stage
3	Vahdat Aghasht	12	6	5	1	23	11	+12	23	
4	Shahin Gorji Mahale Behshahr	12	6	4	2	15	9	+6	22	
5	Yaran Hadi Norouzi	12	6	3	3	12	7	+5	21	
6	Poshtibani Nezaja Mashhad	12	5	4	3	20	12	+8	19 (Note: Head-to-head points: Poshtibani Nezaja Mashhad 3, Shahrdari Gonbad 0.)	Relegation to Provincial Leagues 2022–23
7	Shahrdari Gonbad	12	5	4	3	14	10	+4	19	Relegation to Provincial Leagues 2022–23
8	Esteghlal Jonoub Tehran	12	4	3	5	14	16	−2	15	Relegation to Provincial Leagues 2022–23
9	Shahrdari Karaj	12	3	5	4	10	13	−3	14	Relegation to Provincial Leagues 2022–23
10	Taghdis Mazandaran	12	2	2	8	10	24	−14	8 (Note: Head-to-head points: Taghdis Mazandaran 4, Esteghlal Novin Bojnoord 3, Nader Mashhad 1.)	Relegation to Provincial Leagues 2022–23
11	Esteghlal Novin Bojnoord	12	2	2	8	9	19	−10	8	Relegation to Provincial Leagues 2022–23
12	Nader Mashhad (Note: Nader Mashhad did not participate in two matches and therefore disqualified from the league and punished by two-level-relegation.)	12	2	2	8	10	21	−11	8	Eliminated
13	Kia Shahrood	12	0	4	8	7	23	−16	4	Relegation to Provincial Leagues 2022–23

Updated to match(es) played on 19 February 2023. Source: Dsport
Rules for classification: 1) Points; 2) Head-to-head points; 3) Head-to-head goal difference; 4) Head-to-head goals scored; 5) Goal difference; 6) Goals scored; 7) Play-off at neutral venue.
(Note: Head-to-head record is used only after all the matches between the teams in question have been played).

=== Group B ===
Pos	Team	Pld	W	D	L	GF	GA	GD	Pts	Qualification or relegation
1	Malavan B Anzali	12	10	2	0	28	8	+20	32	Promotion to Second Stage
2	Sorkhpooshan Novin Pakdasht	12	9	2	1	23	4	+19	29	Promotion to Second Stage
3	Pas Gilan	12	7	2	3	19	11	+8	23 (Note: Head-to-head points: Pas Gilan 3, Samit No Qazvin 0.)	
4	Samit No Qazvin	12	6	5	1	17	4	+13	23	
5	Shahrdari Ghaemshahr	12	6	4	2	17	9	+8	22	
6	Arian Sepand Tehran	12	6	3	3	16	10	+6	21	Relegation to Provincial Leagues 2022–23
7	Mi'ad Moghan Parsabad	12	4	2	6	16	19	−3	14 (Note: Head-to-head points: Mi'ad Moghan Parsabad 3, Forooshgah Varzeshi Ali Gheydar 0.)	Relegation to Provincial Leagues 2022–23
8	Forooshgah Varzeshi Ali Gheydar	12	4	2	6	18	21	−3	14	Relegation to Provincial Leagues 2022–23
9	Pouya Deylam Aria Kia	12	3	2	7	12	22	−10	11	Relegation to Provincial Leagues 2022–23
10	Kosar Mehr Eslamshahr	12	2	4	6	13	19	−6	10	Relegation to Provincial Leagues 2022–23
11	Fanavaran Pishro Ardabil	12	3	0	9	12	30	−18	9	Relegation to Provincial Leagues 2022–23
12	Javan Novin Sari	12	2	1	9	10	21	−11	7	Relegation to Provincial Leagues 2022–23
13	Omid Hasanabad Qom (Note: Omid Hasanabad Qom did not participate in two matches and therefore disqualified from the league and punished by two-level-relegation.)	12	0	3	9	4	27	−23	3	Eliminated

Updated to match(es) played on 8 February 2023. Source: Dsport
Rules for classification: 1) Points; 2) Head-to-head points; 3) Head-to-head goal difference; 4) Head-to-head goals scored; 5) Goal difference; 6) Goals scored; 7) Play-off at neutral venue.
(Note: Head-to-head record is used only after all the matches between the teams in question have been played).

=== Group C ===
Pos	Team	Pld	W	D	L	GF	GA	GD	Pts	Qualification or relegation
1	Oghab Tabriz	11	8	1	2	13	5	+8	25 (Note: Head-to-head points: Oghab Tabriz 6, Zist Sabz Tabriz 3, Vahdat Roodbar 0.)	Promotion to Second Stage
2	Zist Sabz Tabriz	11	8	1	2	20	7	+13	25	Promotion to Second Stage
3	Vahdat Roodbar	11	8	1	2	20	9	+11	25	
4	Damash Parseh Tehran	11	6	2	3	27	12	+15	20 (Note: Head-to-head points: Damash Parseh Tehran 3, Sardar Zand Malayer 0.)	
5	Sardar Zand Malayer	11	6	2	3	15	7	+8	20	
6	Moghavemat Tehran	11	5	4	2	16	8	+8	19	Relegation to Provincial Leagues 2022–23
7	Orum Spur Urmia	11	6	0	5	22	13	+9	18	Relegation to Provincial Leagues 2022–23
8	Almas Tazeabad Chaf	11	3	4	4	15	13	+2	13	Relegation to Provincial Leagues 2022–23
9	Pishgaman Fonoon Pars (Note: Artiman Hefdah Iranian Khomein, Shahrdari Baneh and Pishgaman Fonoon Pars did not participate in two matches and therefore disqualified from the league and punished by two-level-relegation.)	11	3	1	7	18	21	−3	10	Eliminated
10	Shahrdari Baneh	11	2	0	9	6	29	−23	6	Eliminated
11	Misagh El Tan Urmia	11	1	2	8	6	26	−20	5	Relegation to Provincial Leagues 2022–23
12	Artiman Hefdah Iranian Khomein	11	0	2	9	2	30	−28	2	Eliminated
13	Payam Zeydi Kashan (Note: Payam Zeydi Kashan withdrew before start of the league.)	0	0	0	0	0	0	0	0	Eliminated

Updated to match(es) played on 7 February 2023. Source: Dsport
Rules for classification: 1) Points; 2) Head-to-head points; 3) Head-to-head goal difference; 4) Head-to-head goals scored; 5) Goal difference; 6) Goals scored; 7) Play-off at neutral venue.
(Note: Head-to-head record is used only after all the matches between the teams in question have been played).

=== Group D ===
Pos	Team	Pld	W	D	L	GF	GA	GD	Pts	Qualification or relegation
1	Parsa Baghmalek	11	7	2	2	27	6	+21	23	Promotion to Second Stage
2	Khorram Kesht Aflak Khorramabad	11	6	4	1	33	12	+21	22	Promotion to Second Stage
3	Yadavaran Dokoohe Andimeshk	11	6	3	2	16	10	+6	21	
4	Naft Ahvaz	11	5	4	2	14	7	+7	19 (Note: Head-to-head points: Naft Ahvaz 6, Perspolis Borazjan 1, Etehad Ghale-Raeisi 1.)	
5	Perspolis Borazjan	11	5	4	2	20	8	+12	19	
6	Etehad Ghale-Raeisi	11	6	1	4	20	11	+9	19	Relegation to Provincial Leagues 2022–23
7	Taraz Chadegan	11	5	2	4	11	11	0	17	Relegation to Provincial Leagues 2022–23
8	Sorkhdelan Parseh Deyr	11	5	1	5	13	11	+2	16 (Note: Head-to-head points: Sorkhdelan Parseh Deyr 1, Shohadaye Bazi Deraz 1. Head-to-head goal difference: Sorkhdelan Parseh Deyr 0, Shohadaye Bazi Deraz 0. Tied on head-to-head criteria.)	Relegation to Provincial Leagues 2022–23
9	Shohadaye Bazi Deraz	11	4	4	3	13	13	0	16	Relegation to Provincial Leagues 2022–23
10	Parsian Harooni	11	2	2	7	6	27	−21	8	Relegation to Provincial Leagues 2022–23
11	Zagros Dehloran	11	1	1	9	7	25	−18	4	Relegation to Provincial Leagues 2022–23
12	Kosar Mehran (Note: Kosar Mehran did not participate in two matches and therefore disqualified from the league and punished by two-level-relegation.)	11	0	0	11	1	40	−39	0	Eliminated
13	Farhang Ramhormoz (Note: Farhang Ramhormoz withdrew before start of the league.)	0	0	0	0	0	0	0	0	Eliminated

Updated to match(es) played on 25 February 2023. Source: Dsport
Rules for classification: 1) Points; 2) Head-to-head points; 3) Head-to-head goal difference; 4) Head-to-head goals scored; 5) Goal difference; 6) Goals scored; 7) Play-off at neutral venue.
(Note: Head-to-head record is used only after all the matches between the teams in question have been played).

=== Group E ===
Pos	Team	Pld	W	D	L	GF	GA	GD	Pts	Qualification or relegation
1	Harang Javan Bastak	11	8	1	2	28	9	+19	25	Promotion to Second Stage
2	Perspolis Shiraz	11	7	3	1	9	2	+7	24	Promotion to Second Stage
3	Esteghlal Shoosh	11	6	2	3	21	8	+13	20 (Note: Head-to-head points: Esteghlal Shoosh 3, Shayan Dizel Fars 0.)	
4	Shayan Dizel Fars	11	6	2	3	20	10	+10	20	
5	Poolad Oxin Izeh	11	5	2	4	14	12	+2	17	
6	Montakhab Kazroon	11	4	3	4	12	11	+1	15	Relegation to Provincial Leagues 2022–23
7	Aboozar Basht	11	4	2	5	18	12	+6	14 (Note: Head-to-head points: Aboozar Basht 6, Motahed Moezabad Roudan 3, Shahrdari Barvat Bam 0.)	Relegation to Provincial Leagues 2022–23
8	Motahed Moezabad Roudan	11	4	2	5	13	23	−10	14	Relegation to Provincial Leagues 2022–23
9	Shahrdari Barvat Bam	11	4	2	5	7	19	−12	14	Relegation to Provincial Leagues 2022–23
10	Padma Yadak Isfahan	11	3	3	5	10	14	−4	12	Relegation to Provincial Leagues 2022–23
11	Bentonit Sepahan Esfahak Tabas	11	2	0	9	8	25	−17	6	Relegation to Provincial Leagues 2022–23
12	Khalij Chabahar	11	1	2	8	9	24	−15	5	Relegation to Provincial Leagues 2022–23
13	Sorkhpooshan Kish (Note: Sorkhpooshan Kish withdrew before start of the league.)	0	0	0	0	0	0	0	0	Eliminated

Updated to match(es) played on 19 February 2023. Source: Dsport
Rules for classification: 1) Points; 2) Head-to-head points; 3) Head-to-head goal difference; 4) Head-to-head goals scored; 5) Goal difference; 6) Goals scored; 7) Play-off at neutral venue.
(Note: Head-to-head record is used only after all the matches between the teams in question have been played).

== Second stage ==
In this stage, 10 teams who qualified from 1st stage will join to 17 remaining teams from previous season and 3 relegated teams from 2nd division (total 30 teams). Teams will be divided into 3 groups of 10 teams each and play a round-robin home and away matches. The winner of each group will promote to 2nd division and 3 runners-up and the best 3rd placed team will qualify to Play-off stage. The 3 bottom clubs in each group and the worst 7th placed team among groups will relegate to next season's 1st stage.

=== Qualified teams ===
Relegated from 2nd Division (3 Teams):

- Abipooshan Omid Koosha Tehran (Replaced by Parsian Tehran)
- Iranjavan Bushehr
- Oghab Tehran

Remaining Teams from last season (17 Teams):

- Benyamin Varzesh Tehran (Replaced by Shahin Rakhsh Khodro Tabriz)
- KIA Tehran
- Sepahan Novin Isfahan
- Mardan Pasha Karaj
- Naft Omidiyeh
- Mohtasham Tabriz (Replaced by Nika Pars Chaloos)
- Omid Vahdat Birjand (Replaced by Parsa San'at Shargh)
- Yazd Looleh
- Kian Arak (Replaced by Shenavarsazi Jam Vatan Qeshm)
- Shahin Bojnord (Replaced by Kavir Moghava Tehran)
- Moghavemat Astara
- Shadkam Mashhad
- Avalan Kamyaran
- Samit Tehran
- Novin Keshavarz Aliabad
- Sepahan Novin Izeh (Replaced by Shayan Dizel Fars)
- Shahrdari Fooman

Promoted from 1st Stage (10 Teams):

- Shariat Novin Mashhad
- Malavan B Anzali
- Oghab Tabriz
- Parsa Baghmalek
- Harang Javan Bastak
- Setaregan Sorkh Tehran
- Sorkhpooshan Novin Pakdasht
- Zist Sabz Tabriz
- Khorram Kesht Aflak Khorramabad
- Perspolis Shiraz

=== Group 1 ===
Pos	Team	Pld	W	D	L	GF	GA	GD	Pts	Qualification or relegation
1	Samit Tehran (P)	18	9	6	3	25	13	+12	33	Promotion to 2023-24 Iran Football's 2nd Division
2	Sorkhpooshan Novin Pakdasht (Q)	18	7	9	2	37	21	+16	30	Promotion to Play-off
3	Shadkam Mashhad	18	6	9	3	20	16	+4	27	
4	Shariat Novin Mashhad	18	7	5	6	21	21	0	26 (Note: Shariat Novin Mashhad and Nika Pars Chaloos are tied on head-to-head criteria, so ranked by total goal difference. Shariat Novin Mashhad 2-0 Nika Pars Chaloos, Nika Pars Chaloos 2-0 Shariat Novin Mashhad.)	
5	Nika Pars Chaloos	18	7	5	6	23	26	−3	26	
6	KIA Tehran	18	7	3	8	26	25	+1	24	
7	Oghab Tehran	18	5	6	7	18	22	−4	21	
8	Parsa San'at Shargh (R)	18	5	4	9	21	29	−8	19 (Note: Parsa San'at Shargh are ahead of Novin Keshavarz Aliabad based on head-to-head points. Parsa San'at 3-2 Novin Keshavarz Aliabad, Novin Keshavarz Aliabad 0-0 Parsa San'at.)	Relegation to 3rd Division - 1st Stage 2023–24
9	Novin Keshavarz Aliabad (R)	18	4	7	7	25	27	−2	19	Relegation to 3rd Division - 1st Stage 2023–24
10	Mardan Pasha Karaj (R)	18	4	4	10	17	33	−16	16	Relegation to 3rd Division - 1st Stage 2023–24

Updated to match(es) played on 31 July 2023. Source:
Rules for classification: 1) Points; 2) Head-to-head points; 3) Head-to-head goal difference; 4) Head-to-head goals scored; 5) Goal difference; 6) Goals scored; 7) Play-off at neutral venue.
(Note: Head-to-head record is used only after all the matches between the teams in question have been played).
Notes:

Home \ Away	KIA	MPA	NPC	NKA	OGH	PSS	SAM	SHA	SNM	SOR
KIA Tehran	—	1–2	3–0 (Note: Nika Pars did not show up on the field.)	1–1	2–0	3–1	0–2	0–0	0–0	0–3 (Note: Kia used an ineligible player in the match therefore Sorkhpooshan awarded a 3-0 win. The main result was "KIA 3-2 Sorkhpooshan" before the Disciplinary Committee's announcement.)
Mardan Pasha Karaj	1–4	—	2–1	1–0	1–0	2–3	1–1	0–0	1–4	2–2
Nika Pars Chaloos	2–1	3–1	—	2–1	1–1	3–2	2–4	0–1	2–0	0–0
Novin Keshavarz Aliabad	2–1	3–0	1–1	—	0–1	0–0	1–0	2–2	3–0	2–2
Oghab Tehran	2–3	2–1	0–1	0–0	—	1–0	0–1	1–0	1–1	1–1
Parsa San'at Shargh	1–3	1–0	1–3	3–2	3–1	—	0–0	1–1	2–0	2–2
Samit Tehran	3–0 (Note: Kia used an ineligible player in the match therefore Parsian awarded a 3-0 win. The main result was "Samit 1-2 KIA" before the Disciplinary Committee's announcement.)	1–1	0–0	3–2	1–1	3–0	—	1–1	2–1	1–0
Shadkaam Mashhad	1–2	2–1	2–2	2–0	3–2	1–0	1–0	—	0–1	1–1
Shariat Novin Mashhad	2–1	2–1	2–0	2–2	1–2	1–0	1–0	1–1	—	2–2
Sorkhpooshan Novin Pakdasht	2–1	4–0	4–0	6–3	2–2	3–1	1–2	1–1	1–0	—

Updated to match(es) played on 31 July 2023. Source:
Legend: Blue = home team win; Yellow = draw; Red = away team win.

=== Group 2 ===
Pos	Team	Pld	W	D	L	GF	GA	GD	Pts	Qualification or relegation
1	Kavir Moghava Tehran (P)	18	9	6	3	37	12	+25	33	Promotion to 2023-24 Iran Football's 2nd Division
2	Rakhsh Khodro Tabriz (Q)	18	8	5	5	23	18	+5	29 (Note: Rakhsh Khodro Tabtriz are ahead of Shahrdari Fooman based on Head-to-Head Away Goals: Shahrdari Fooman 3-1 Rakhsh Khodro Tabtriz, Rakhsh Khodro Tabtriz 2-0 Shahrdari Fooman.)	Promotion to Play-off
3	Shahrdari Fooman	18	9	2	7	26	19	+7	29	
4	Malavan B Anzali	18	8	3	7	26	23	+3	27	
5	Setaregan Sorkh Tehran	18	7	5	6	28	17	+11	26 (Note: Setaregan Sorkh Tehran are ahead of Parsian Tehran based on Head-to-Head Points: Parsian 0-3 Setaregan Sorkh, Setaregan Sorkh 1-0 Parsian.)	
6	Parsian Tehran	18	7	5	6	29	22	+7	26	
7	Setareh Ettehad (Damash) Tabriz	18	5	8	5	26	27	−1	23	
8	Moghavemat Astara (R)	18	4	9	5	23	22	+1	21 (Note: Moghavemat Astara are ahead of Oghab Tabriz based on Head-to-Head Points: Oghab Tabriz 3-3 Moghavemat Astara, Moghavemat Astara 2-1 Oghab Tabriz.)	Relegation to 3rd Division - 1st Stage 2023–24
9	Oghab Tabriz (R)	18	5	6	7	19	17	+2	21	Relegation to 3rd Division - 1st Stage 2023–24
10	Avalan Kamyaran (R)	18	2	3	13	8	68	−60	9	Relegation to 3rd Division - 1st Stage 2023–24

Updated to match(es) played on 31 July 2023. Source:
Rules for classification: 1) Points; 2) Head-to-head points; 3) Head-to-head goal difference; 4) Head-to-head goals scored; 5) Goal difference; 6) Goals scored; 7) Play-off at neutral venue.
(Note: Head-to-head record is used only after all the matches between the teams in question have been played).
Notes:

Home \ Away	AVA	KMT	MAL	MOG	OGH	PAR	RKT	SST	SET	SHF
Avalan Kamyaran	—	1–0	0–9 (Note: The match was abandoned and the score was 9-0 at the time of stoppage.)	0–4	0–3	0–3 (Note: Avalan did not show up on the field.)	1–0	1–1	1–2	0–5 (Note: The match was abandoned in 35' due to Avalan's lack of players and the score was 5-0 at the time of stoppage.)
Kavir Moghava Tehran	13–0	—	3–0	1–1	1–0	1–1	1–0	0–0	3–1	2–2
Malavan B Anzali	2–0	2–1	—	1–0	1–0	1–0	2–2	1–0	1–1	2–1
Moghavemat Astara	0–0	1–1	2–2	—	2–1	1–1	0–2	0–1	1–1	3–0
Oghab Tabriz	2–2	0–1	1–0	3–3	—	2–1	0–0	3–0 (Note: The match between Oghab and Setaregan Sorkh was stopped due to misbehaviour of Setaregan Sorkh's manager. Oghab awarded a 3-0 win by Disciplinary Committee.)	0–1	1–0
Parsian Tehran	2–0	0–3 (Note: Parsian used an ineligible player in the match, therefore Kavir Moghava awarded a 3-0 win. The main result was "Parsian 0-0 Kavir Moghava" before the Disciplinary Committee's announcement.)	4–0	5–1	1–1	—	1–1	0–3 (Note: Parsian used an ineligible player in the match, therefore Setaregan Sorkh awarded a 3-0 win. The main result was "Parsian 2-1 Setaregan Sorkh" before the Disciplinary Committee's announcement.)	2–1	2–0
Rakhsh Khodro Tabriz	3–0	0–3 (Note: The match between Rakhsh Khodro and Kavir Moghava was stopped due to protest of Rakhsh Khodro team. Kavir Moghava awarded a 3-0 win by Disciplinary Committee. The result before stoppage was "Rakhsh Khodro 0-1 Kavir Moghava".)	3–1	0–0	2–1	1–4	—	2–1	0–0	2–0
Setaregan Sorkh Tehran	7–0	1–2	3–1	3–1	0–0	1–0	0–1	—	2–2	3–0
Setareh Ettehad Tabriz	9–2	1–1	1–0	0–3 (Note: The match awarded a 3-0 win for Moghavemat by the Disciplinary Committee due to absence of an ambulance on the field.)	1–1	2–2	0–3	1–1	—	2–0
Shahrdari Fooman	3–0	1–0	1–0	0–0	1–0	3–0	2–1	2–1	4–0	—

Updated to match(es) played on 31 July 2023. Source:
Legend: Blue = home team win; Yellow = draw; Red = away team win.

=== Group 3 ===
Pos	Team	Pld	W	D	L	GF	GA	GD	Pts	Qualification or relegation
1	Shenavarsazi Jam Vatan Qeshm (P)	18	10	4	4	24	18	+6	34	Promotion to 2023-24 Iran Football's 2nd Division
2	Sepahan Novin Isfahan (Q)	18	10	3	5	17	11	+6	33	Promotion to Play-off
3	Shayan Dizel Fars (Q)	18	9	5	4	25	15	+10	32	Promotion to Play-off
4	Harang Javan Bastak	18	6	6	6	21	22	−1	24	
5	Parsa Baghmalek	18	6	4	8	21	24	−3	22 (Note: Parsa Baghmalek are ahead of Naft Omidiyeh based on head-to-head points. Naft Omidiyeh 0-1 Parsa Baghmalek, Parsa Baghmalek 0-0 Naft Omidiyeh.)	
6	Naft Omidiyeh	18	6	4	8	19	16	+3	22	
7	Iranjavan Bushehr	18	4	9	5	20	23	−3	21 (Note: Iranjavan Bushehr are ahead of Yazd Looleh based on head-to-head away goals. Iranjavan 2, Yazd Looleh 0.)	
8	Yazd Looleh (R)	18	4	9	5	22	21	+1	21	Relegation to 3rd Division - 1st Stage 2023–24
9	Khorram Kesht Aflak Khorramabad (R)	18	5	4	9	16	23	−7	19	Relegation to 3rd Division - 1st Stage 2023–24
10	Perspolis Shiraz (R)	18	4	4	10	17	29	−12	16	Relegation to 3rd Division - 1st Stage 2023–24

Updated to match(es) played on 31 July 2023. Source:
Rules for classification: 1) Points; 2) Head-to-head points; 3) Head-to-head goal difference; 4) Head-to-head goals scored; 5) Goal difference; 6) Goals scored; 7) Play-off at neutral venue.
(Note: Head-to-head record is used only after all the matches between the teams in question have been played).
Notes:

Home \ Away	HJB	IJB	KKK	NAF	PAR	PER	SEP	SDF	SVQ	YAZ
Harang Javan Bastak	—	1–0	3–0	1–0	1–2	1–1	2–0	0–1	0–0	1–0
Iranjavan Bushehr	2–2	—	1–0	3–2	4–1	1–1	0–1	0–0	2–0	0–0
Khorram Kesht Aflak Khorramabad	1–2	2–2	—	1–0	1–1	3–2	1–0	0–1	1–1	1–1
Naft Omidiyeh	3–1	1–1	1–0	—	0–1	0–1	1–2	1–0	5–0	0–0
Parsa Baghmalek	2–2	2–0	0–0	0–0	—	3–1	0–1	1–0	1–2	3–0 (Note: The match between Parsa Baghmalek and Yazd Looleh was stopped and the Disciplinary Committee found Yazd Looleh guilty. The result before stoppage was "Parsa Baghmalek 1-0 Yazd Looleh".)
Perspolis Shiraz	1–0	1–1	1–3	0–1	2–0	—	1–0	1–2	1–2	3–3
Sepahan Novin Isfahan	1–1	0–0	2–1	0–1	1–0	3–0	—	0–0	1–0	2–0
Shayan Dizel Fars	1–0	5–1	4–1	2–1	2–1	2–0	0–1	—	2–2	1–1
Shenavarsazi Jam Vatan Qeshm	3–3	2–0	1–0	2–1	2–1	3–0	2–0	2–0	—	0–0
Yazd Looleh	4–0	2–2	1–0	1–1	5–2	1–0	1–2	2–2	0–1	—

Updated to match(es) played on 31 July 2023. Source:
Legend: Blue = home team win; Yellow = draw; Red = away team win.

=== Ranking of third-placed teams ===
Pos	Team	Pld	W	D	L	GF	GA	GD	Pts	Qualification or relegation
1	Shayan Dizel Fars	18	9	5	4	25	15	+10	32	Promotion to Play-off
2	Shahrdari Fooman	18	9	2	7	26	19	+7	29	
3	Shadkaam Mashhad	18	6	9	3	20	16	+4	27	

Updated to match(es) played on 31 July 2023. Source:
Rules for classification: 1) points; 2) goal difference; 3) number of goals scored; 4) Play-off at neutral venue.

=== Ranking of seventh-placed teams ===
Pos	Team	Pld	W	D	L	GF	GA	GD	Pts	Qualification or relegation
1	Setareh Ettehad (Damash) Tabriz	18	5	8	5	26	27	−1	23	
2	Iranjavan Bushehr	18	4	9	5	20	23	−3	21	
3	Oghab Tehran	18	5	6	7	18	22	−4	21	Remained in 3rd Division - 2nd Stage 2023–24 after relegation (Note: The worst seventh-placed should relegate to 3rd Division - 1st Stage. But due to direct relegation of Machine Sazi Tabriz from 2nd division to 3rd Division - 1st Stage (instead of 3rd Division - 2nd Stage), they remained in 3rd Division - 2nd Stage and not relegated.)

Updated to match(es) played on 31 July 2023. Source:
Rules for classification: 1) points; 2) goal difference; 3) number of goals scored; 4) play-off at neutral venue.

== Play-offs ==
=== Qualified teams ===
2nd placed teams in Second Stage (3 teams):

- Sorkhpooshan Novin Pakdasht
- Rakhsh Khodro Tabriz
- Sepahan Novin Isfahan

Best 3rd placed team in Second Stage (1 team):

- Shayan Dizel Fars
1. Parsian Tehran was introduced as Group B runner-up at the time of the draw on 13 August. On 14 August, the Appeals Committee stated the disciplinary 3-0 loss for Parsian, in the match between them and Setaregan Sorkh Tehran and the rankings of Group B has changed. Therefore, Parsian Tehran was replaced by Rakhsh Khodro Tabriz.

=== First round ===
Team 1	Score	Team 2	1st leg	2nd leg	Notes
Sorkhpooshan Novin Pakdasht	3-2	Rakhsh Khodro Tabriz	3-1	0-1	
Sepahan Novin Isfahan	2-3	Shayan Dizel Fars	0-2	2-1	

17 August 2023
17:00

Sorkhpooshan Novin Pakdasht	3-1	Rakhsh Khodro Tabriz
Hamed Akbaripour; Hamed Akbaripour; Mojtaba Shiri

Shohadaye Mersad, Tehran
22 August 2023
17:00

Rakhsh Khodro Tabriz	1-0	Sorkhpooshan Novin Pakdasht
Mehdi Ghiasi Fard

Shahrdari, Tabriz

Sorkhpooshan Novin Pakdasht Fars won 3-2 and promoted to second play-off round.

17 August 2023
17:15

Sepahan Novin Isfahan	0-2	Shayan Dizel Fars
		Heydar Heydari; Ali Hesami

Qods, Isfahan
22 August 2023
17:15

Shayan Dizel Fars	1-2	Sepahan Novin Isfahan
Morteza Sanjanaki		Peyman Dadkhah; Mohammad Reza Asgari

Dastgheib, Shiraz

Shayan Dizel Fars won 3-2 and promoted to second play-off round.

=== Second round ===
Team 1	Score	Team 2	1st leg	2nd leg	Notes
Sorkhpooshan Novin Pakdasht	2-1	Shayan Dizel Fars	1-0	1-1	

27 August 2023
16:50

Sorkhpooshan Novin Pakdasht	1-0	Shayan Dizel Fars
Mojtaba Shiri

Shohadaye Mersad, Pakdasht
1 September 2023
17:00

Shayan Dizel Fars	1-1	Sorkhpooshan Novin Pakdasht

Dastgheib, Shiraz

Sorkhpooshan Novin Pakdasht won 2-1 on aggerate and promoted to 2023-24 Iran Football's 2nd Division.

== See also ==
- 2022–23 Persian Gulf Pro League
- 2022–23 Azadegan League
- 2022–23 2nd Division
- 2022–23 Hazfi Cup
- 2022 Iranian Super Cup
