= 2024–25 League 2 (Iran) =

24th season of Iran League 2

Iran Football's 2nd Division
- Season: 2024–25
- Dates: 14 October 2024 – 21 May 2025
- Champions: Fard Alborz
- Promoted: Shenavarsazi Qeshm; Fard Alborz; Navad Urmia
- Relegated: Bahman Javan Tehran; Oghab Tehran; Shohada Babolsar; Ferdowsi Samen; Arian Hamedan; Darya Aryan Babol

The 2024–25 season of Iran Football's 2nd Division was the 24th under 2nd Division since its establishment (current format) in 2001. The season featured 22 teams from the 2nd Division 2023–24, three new team relegated from the 2023–24 Azadegan League: Darya Babol, Shahin Bandar Ameri, Khooshe Talayi Mashhad, and four new teams promoted from the 3rd Division 2023–24: Oghab Tehran, Shahin Tehran, Esteghlal Zeydoon and Sepahan Novin Esfahan.
These changes has been applied before the season:

Team	Replaced team
Besat Kermanshah	Iranhavan Bushehr
Shohadaye Razakan Karaj	Fard Alborz
Shahrdari Hamedan	Aryan Hamedan
Ayande Sazan Ardebil	Kesht o Sanat Padyab Khalkhal
Setaregan Javan Tehran	Bahman Tehran

== Teams ==
=== Stadia and locations ===
Locations of clubs in 2024–25 Iran Football's 2nd Division

=== Number of teams by region ===
	Region	Number of teams	Teams
1	Tehran	6	Bahman Tehran, Espad Alvand, Oghab, KIA, YASA, Shahin
2	Hormozgan	3	Foolad Hormozgan, Shahrdari Bandar Abbas, Shenavar Sazi
3	Khuzestan	3	Foolad Novin, Shahrdari Mahshahr
4	Mazandaran	3	Daryaye Caspian Babol, Nika Pars Chaloos, Shohadaye Babolsar
5	Bushehr	2	Iranjavan Bushehr, Shahin Bushehr
6	Gilan	2	Chooka Talesh, Sepidrood Rasht
7	Hamedan	2	Aryan Hamedan, PAS Hamedan
8	Alborz	1	Shohadaye Razakan
9	Ardabil	1	Ayande Sazan
10	Isfahan	1	Sepahan Novin
11	Markazi	1	Petroshimi Shazand
12	Razavi Khorasan	1	Khooshe Talayi
13	West Azerbaijan	1	Navad Urmia
14	Yazd	1	Shahid Ghandi Yazd

== Seeding ==
The teams were seeded according to their performance in the 2023–24 2nd Division, Azadegan League and 3rd Division. The relegated teams from 2023–24 Azadegan League and the loser of the Plat-off Match were placed in Pot 1. The remaining teams from 2023 to 2024 2nd Division were placed in Pot 2 to Pot 6 according to their final league position. And the promoted teams from 2023–24 3rd Division were placed in Pot 7.

Pot Number	Pot Name	Teams
Pot 1	Relegated Teams from Azadegan League and 2nd Divions's Play-off loser	Darya Caspian Babol (16); Shahin Bandar Ameri (17); Khoshe Talayi Mashhad (18); Shahrdari Mahshahr (PL)
Pot 2	Teams ranked 3rd and 4th in 2nd Division	Bahman Tehran (3); Shenavar Sazi Qeshm (3); Nika Pars Chaloos (4); Sepidrood Rasht (4)
Pot 3	Teams ranked 5th and 6th in 2nd Division	Pas Hamedan (5); Besat Kermanshah (Replaced by Iranjavan Bushehr (5); Foolad Hormozgan (6); Chooka Talesh (6)
Pot 4	Teams ranked 7th and 8th in 2nd Division	Shohadaye Babolsar (7); Aryan Hamedan (7); Navad Urmia (8); Ayande Sazan Ardebil (8)
Pot 5	Teams ranked 9th and 10th in 2nd Division	Shahid Ghandi Yazd (9); Foolad Novin Ahvaz (9); Espad Tehran (10); Shohadaye Razakan Karaj (Replaced by Fard Alborz) (10)
Pot 6	Teams ranked 11th and 12th	YASA Tehran (11); Petroshimi Shazand (11); Kia Tehran (12); Shahrdari Bandar Abbas (12)
Pot 7	Teams promoted from 3rd Division	Oghab Tehran (1); Shahin Tehran (1); Esteghlal Zeydoon (1); Sepahan Novin Isfahan (PW)

Notes

- For the provinces which have three or more teams (Tehran, Khuzestan, Mazandaran and Hormozgan), a protection rule was applied. For example, from three teams of Hormozgan, two teams should be placed in one group and the third team can not be placed in the same group.
- Due to licence transfers of teams, the new location of each team (after confirmation) is considered in the draw.

== League table ==
=== Group A ===
Pos	Team	Pld	W	D	L	GF	GA	GD	Pts	Promotion or relegation
1	Shenavar Sazi Qeshm (Q)	26	17	4	5	37	20	+17	55	2024–25 Azadegan League & Final Match
2	Navad Urmia (P)	26	16	5	5	32	18	+14	53	Promotion Play-off
3	Foolad Hormozgan	26	11	12	3	34	16	+18	45 (Note: Foolad Hormozgan are ahead of Shahin Bandar Ameri based on head-to-head points: Foolad Hormozgan 4, Shahin Bandar Ameri 1.)	
4	Shahin Bandar Ameri	26	12	9	5	29	15	+14	45	
5	Shahrdari Mahshahr	26	10	9	7	28	28	0	39	
6	Chooka Talesh	26	9	9	8	24	27	−3	36	
7	KIA Tehran	26	7	9	10	27	27	0	30 (Note: KIA Tehran are ahead of YASA Tehran based on head-to-head points: KIA Tehran 4, YASA Tehran 1.)	
8	YASA Tehran	26	7	9	10	24	31	−7	30	
9	Kesht o Sanat Padyab	26	5	14	7	20	25	−5	29	
10	Foolad Novin Ahvaz	26	6	10	10	16	17	−1	28 (Note: Foolad Novin Ahvaz and Sepahan Novin Isfahan are tied in head-to-head matches, thus they are ranked according to their overal goal difference.)	
11	Sepahan Novin Isfahan	26	7	7	12	21	24	−3	28	
12	Oghab Tehran (R)	26	5	12	9	17	20	−3	27 (Note: Oghab Tehran and Setaregan Bahman Javan Tehran are tied in head-to-head matches, thus they are ranked according to their overal goal difference.)	Relegation to 2025–26 3rd Division
13	Setaregan Bahman Javan Tehran (R)	26	5	12	9	22	29	−7	27	Relegation to 2025–26 3rd Division
14	Shohadaye Babolsar (R)	26	4	1	21	16	50	−34	13	Relegation to 2025–26 4th Division

Updated to match(es) played on 14 May 2024. Source: Varzesh 3
Rules for classification: 1) Points; 2) Head-to-head points; 3) Head-to-head goal difference; 4) Head-to-head goals scored; 5) Goal difference; 6) Goals scored; 7) Play-off at neutral venue.
(Note: Head-to-head record is used only after all the matches between the teams in question have been played).

=== Group B ===
Pos	Team	Pld	W	D	L	GF	GA	GD	Pts	Promotion or relegation
1	Fard Alborz (Q)	26	16	8	2	39	18	+21	56	2025-26 Azadegan League & Final Match
2	Shahid Ghandi Yazd (P)	26	13	11	2	40	18	+22	50	Promotion Play-off
3	Esteghlal Zeydoon	26	12	7	7	32	13	+19	43	
4	Shahin Tehran	26	11	7	8	36	31	+5	40 (Note: Shahin Tehran and Nika Pars Chaloos are tied in head-to-head matches, thus they are ranked according to their overal goal difference.)	
5	Nika Pars Chaloos	26	10	10	6	26	22	+4	40	
6	Sh. Bandar Abbas	26	10	9	7	34	21	+13	39	
7	Iranjavan Bushehr	26	9	11	6	30	25	+5	38	
8	Sepidrood Rasht	26	8	9	9	37	31	+6	33	
9	Pas Hamedan	26	7	9	10	19	23	−4	30	
10	Spad Alvand Tehran	26	7	8	11	24	35	−11	29	
11	Petroshimi Shazand	26	6	10	10	26	37	−11	28	
12	Setaregan Sorkh Asia (R)	26	8	3	15	19	28	−9	27	Relegation to 2025–26 3rd Division
13	Aryan Hamedan (R)	26	5	9	12	24	42	−18	24	Relegation to 2025–26 3rd Division
14	Darya Babol (R)	26	1	7	18	14	56	−42	10	Relegation to 2025–26 3rd Division

Updated to match(es) played on 14 May 2024. Source: Varzesh 3
Rules for classification: 1) Points; 2) Head-to-head points; 3) Head-to-head goal difference; 4) Head-to-head goals scored; 5) Goal difference; 6) Goals scored; 7) Play-off at neutral venue.
(Note: Head-to-head record is used only after all the matches between the teams in question have been played).

== Results ==
=== Group A ===
Home \ Away	KIA	NVU	YAS	SEP	SDB	KSP	CHT	FOL	FOH	BAH	SHA	OGH	SHM	SSQ
KIA Tehran	—	1–2	1–1	1–3	4–1	0–0	0–0	0–0	0–0	1–1	3–0	0–0	2–4	0–1
Navad Urmia	1–2	—	3–0	1–0	1–0	2–2	1–0	1–0	2–0	2–0	2–0	1–0	0–0	1–0
YASA Tehran	1–2	1–1	—	0–0	4–0	0–0	0–0	2–0	0–3	0–0	1–2	2–1	1–1	1–2
Sepahan Novin Isfahan	0–1	3–0	3–0	—	1–1	0–0	1–1	2–1	0–0	2–1	2–0	0–0	2–0	0–1
Shohadaye Babolsar	3–5	0–1	2–0	2–0	—	1–0	2–3	1–0 (Note: by Disciplinary Committee)	0–1	0–1	1–3	0–1	0–1	0–1
Kesht o Sanat Padyab	1–0	0–0	2–2	2–0	1–0	—	0–0	2–2	0–0	1–1	0–2	2–4	2–1	0–0
Chooka Talesh	1–0	1–2	2–1	3–0	1–0	1–0	—	1–1	1–1	1–1	0–3	1–0	0–1	1–1
Foolad Novin Ahvaz	0–0	1–0	0–1	1–0	5–0	0–0	1–0	—	0–1	0–0	0–0	1–0	0–1	3–2
Foolad Hormozgan	1–0	1–2	2–0	2–1	3–0	0–0	4–0	1–0	—	0–0	1–0	0–0	2–2	0–1
Setaregan Bahman Javan Tehran	1–1	2–1	1–2	1–0	2–1	0–1	2–3	1–0	1–5	—	1–1	0–0	2–3	0–0
Shahin Bandar Ameri	1–0	0–1	0–0	0–0	3–0	4–1	0–0	0–0	1–1	1–0	—	1–1	1–0	1–0
Oghab Tehran	1–3	1–1	0–2	2–0	3–0	0–0	2–1	0–0	0–0	1–1	0–1	—	0–0	0–1
Shahrdari Mahshahr	1–0	1–2	1–2	1–0	2–1	2–1	1–2	0–0	2–2	1–1	0–0	0–0	—	1–0
Shenavar Sazi Qeshm	2–0	2–1	2–0	2–1	2–0	3–2	2–0	1–0	3–3	1–0	0–4	2–0	5–1	—

Updated to match(es) played on 13 May 2025. Source: Varzesh 3
Legend: Blue = home team win; Yellow = draw; Red = away team win.

=== Group B ===
Home \ Away	SPA	DCB	FAA	ARH	NPC	IJB	PAH	SSA	ESZ	SHN	SGY	PTS	SRR	SBA
Spad Alvand Tehran	—	4–0	0–0	2–2	0–0	1–1	1–1	0–0	1–0	1–0	0–6	0–0	2–0	1–3
Darya Babol	2–1	—	0–3	0–0	1–1	0–2	2–3	1–2	1–7	0–3	0–1	1–1	2–2	0–0
Fard Alborz	0–1	2–0	—	1–0	1–0	1–1	0–0	2–0	1–0	1–0	1–1	4–2	4–1	1–0
Aryan Hamedan	0–0	1–1	2–3	—	2–0	1–0	1–1	1–0	1–2	1–0	0–3	1–1	2–2	2–0
Nika Pars Chaloos	1–0	0–0	1–1	2–2	—	3–1	1–0	1–0	2–1	1–1	2–0	2–1	1–0	1–1
Iranjavan Bushehr	0–2	1–0	0–0	2–0	3–0	—	1–1	2–0	1–1	4–0	1–1	2–1	2–2	1–0
Pas Hamedan	2–1	1–0	2–3	2–0	1–1	0–1	—	1–0	1–0	1–0	0–0	0–1	0–1	0–0
Setaregan Sorkh Asia	1–0	1–0	1–2	1–0	1–0	1–1	2–0	—	0–2	2–3	0–0	2–1	1–0	1–2
Esteghlal Zeydoon	2–1	3–0	0–1	1–0	0–1	2–0	0–0	1–0	—	3–0	0–0	3–1	3–0	0–0
Shahin Tehran	2–1	2–1	2–3	2–2	1–1	4–1	1–0	2–1	0–0	—	3–3	4–1	1–1	1–0
Shahid Ghandi Yazd	3–0	4–0	1–1	2–1	1–1	1–1	1–0	2–1	1–0	2–1	—	1–1	3–0	1–0
Petroshimi Shazand	0–2	2–1	1–1	3–0	0–3	1–1	2–1	1–0	0–0	0–2	0–0	—	1–0	1–1
Sepidrood Rasht	3–0	6–0	1–2	6–1	1–0	0–0	1–1	2–1	0–1	0–0	3–0	3–1	—	1–1
Sh. Bandar Abbas	6–2	3–1	1–0	5–1	2–0	2–0	2–0	1–0	0–0	0–1	1–2	2–2	1–1	—

Updated to match(es) played on 13 May 2025. Source: Varzesh 3
Legend: Blue = home team win; Yellow = draw; Red = away team win.

== Promotion Play-Off ==
Team 1	Agg.	Team 2	1st leg	2nd leg
Navad Urmia	3–2	Shahid Ghandi Yazd	2–1	1–1

=== Leg 1 ===
14 May 2025
19:00

Navad Urmia	2–1	Shahid Ghandi Yazd

Shahid Bakeri, Urmia

=== Leg 2 ===
21 May 2025
19:00

Shahid Ghandi Yazd	1–1	Navad Urmia

Shahid Nasiri, Yazd

Source=

Navad Urmia promoted to 2025-26 Azadegan league

== 2nd Division Final ==
Team 1	Score	Team 2
Fard Alborz	2–1	Shenavar Sazi Qeshm

=== Single Match ===
13 May 2025
17:30

Fard Alborz	0–0	Shenavar Sazi Qeshm

Takhti Stadium, Tehran

Fard Alborz won the league and got the Champion Trophy.

== Relegation Play-off ==
Team 1	Score	Team 2
Oghab Tehran	0–0 (6–7 PSO)	Ferdosi Samen Mashhad

=== Single Match ===
29 September 2025
15:00

Oghab Tehran	0–0 (a.e.t.)	Ferdosi Samen Mashhad
Penalties
	6–7

Azadi, Gorgan

Ferdosi Samen Mashhad remain in the league.

== See also ==
- 2024–25 Persian Gulf Pro League
- 2024–25 Azadegan League
- 2024–25 3rd Division
- 2024–25 Hazfi Cup
- 2024 Iranian Super Cup
