= Amirreza Firouzbakht =

Iranian footballer

Personal information
- Date of birth: 2 April 2004 (age 22)
- Place of birth: Tabriz, Iran
- Height: 1.80 m (5 ft 11 in)
- Position: Defensive midfielder

Team information
- Current team: Tractor
- Number: 88

Youth career
- KIA

Senior career*
Years	Team	Apps	(Gls)
2023–2024	KIA	13	(0)
2024–	Tractor	0	(0)
- * Club domestic league appearances and goals as of 2 January 2025

Amirreza Firouzbakht (Persian: امیررضا فیروزبخت; born 2 April 2004) is an Iranian footballer who plays as a Defensive midfielder for Persian Gulf Pro League side Tractor.

Firouzbakht joined Tractor in 2024 and Dragan Stojković confirmed him to be in the main team.

== Club ==
He played his first game in the Asian Champions League against Roshan Tajikistan.

Tractor

- Persian Gulf Pro League: 2024–25
