= 2023–24 Iran Football's 3rd Division =

Iran Football's 3rd Division
- Season: 2023–24

The article contains information about the 2023–24 Iran 3rd Division football season. This is the 4th rated football league in Iran after the Persian Gulf Cup, Azadegan League, and 2nd Division. The league has been expanded from 85 to 98 teams.

In total 105 teams (81 teams in the first stage in 6 groups, 24 teams added in second stage) will compete in this season's competitions.

== Schedule ==
The schedule of the competition is as follows.

Stage	Draw date	Week	Group A	Group B	Group C	Group D	Group E	Group F
First stage	9 October 2023	Week 1	5 November 2023	6-7 November 2023	5-6 November 2023	6-7 November 2023	7 November 2023	7 November 2023
First stage	9 October 2023	Week 2	10 November 2023	11-12 November 2023	10-11 November 2023	11-12 November 2023	12 November 2023	12-13 November 2023
First stage	9 October 2023	Week 3	15-16 November 2023	17-18 November 2023	15-16 November 2023	16-18 November 2023	18 November 2023	18 November 2023
First stage	9 October 2023	Week 4	21-22 November 2023	23 November 2023	21-22 November 2023	23-25 November 2023	23-24 November 2023	23-24 November 2023
First stage	9 October 2023	Week 5	27 November	2 December 2023	27-28 November	2,4 December	29-30 November	4 December 2023
First stage	9 October 2023	Week 6	3-4 December 2023	7-8 December 2023	3 December 2023	7, 9-10 December 2023	6 December 2023	9-10 December 2023
First stage	9 October 2023	Week 7	8-9 December 2023	13-14 December 2023	8-9 December 2023	15, 20 December 2023	12, 15 December 2023	15-16 December 2023
First stage	9 October 2023	Week 8	13-14 December 2023	18-20 December 2023	13-14 December 2023	22, 24 December 2023	18 December 2023	20-22 December 2023
First stage	9 October 2023	Week 9	18-19 December 2023	23-25 December 2023	18-19 December 2023	28, 30 December 2023, 3 January 2024	23-24 December 2023	27 December 2023
First stage	9 October 2023	Week 10	24 December 2023	29-30 December 2023	24 December 2023	4-8 January 2024	29-30 December 2023, 1 January 2024	1 January 2024
First stage	9 October 2023	Week 11	30 December 2023	4 January 2024	30-31 December 2023	12-14 January 2024	5 January 2024	6, 16 January 2024
First stage	9 October 2023	Week 12	6 January 2024	12 January 2024	6-7 January 2024	20 January 2024	10 January 2024	11 January 2024
First stage	9 October 2023	Week 13	13 January 2024	18 January 2024	13 January 2024	25 January 2024	15 January 2024	16 January 2024
Stage	Draw date	Week	Group 1	Group 2	Group 3			
Second Stage	6 February 2024	Week 1	19, 20 February 2024	19 February 2024	19 February 2024			
Second Stage	6 February 2024	Week 2	26, 27 February 2024	25, 26 February 2024	26 February 2024			
Second Stage	6 February 2024	Week 3	4 March 2024	3, 4 March 2024	4 March 2024			
Second Stage	6 February 2024	Week 4	9, 10 March 2024	10 March 2024	10 March 2024			
Second Stage	6 February 2024	Week 5	17 March 2024	16-18 March 2024	16, 17 March 2024			
Second Stage	6 February 2024	Week 6	3,4 April 2024	3-5 April 2024	3 April 2024			
Second Stage	6 February 2024	Week 7	10 April 2024	10 April 2024	10 April 2024			
Second Stage	6 February 2024	Week 8	15, 16 April 2024	16 April 2024	16 April 2024			
Second Stage	6 February 2024	Week 9	22 April 2024	22 April 2024	22 April 2024			
Second Stage	6 February 2024	Week 10	27 April 2024	27 April 2024	27 April 2024			
Second Stage	6 February 2024	Week 11	2, 3 May 2024	2 May 2024	2, 3 May 2024			
Second Stage	6 February 2024	Week 12	15 May 2024	15 May 2024	15 May 2024			
Second Stage	6 February 2024	Week 13	20 May 2024; 12 July 2024	20 May 2024; 12 June 2024	20, 21 May 2024; 12 June 2024			
Second Stage	6 February 2024	Week 14	26 May 2024	26 May 2024	26 May 2024			
Second Stage	6 February 2024	Week 15	1 June 2024	1 June 2024	1 June 2024			
Second Stage	6 February 2024	Week 16	6 June 2024	6 June 2024	6 June 2024			
Second Stage	6 February 2024	Week 17	TBA	TBA	TBA			
Second Stage	6 February 2024	Week 18	TBA	TBA	TBA			
Second Stage	6 February 2024	Week 19	TBA	TBA	TBA			
Second Stage	6 February 2024	Week 20	TBA	TBA	TBA			
Second Stage	6 February 2024	Week 21	TBA	TBA	TBA			
Second Stage	6 February 2024	Week 22	TBA	TBA	TBA			

== First stage ==
81 teams will play in 3 groups of 13 and 3 groups of 14 teams each. The top 2 teams from each group (total 12 teams) will advance to the Second Stage. The teams ranked 3rd, 4th and 5th in each group (total 18 teams) will be eligible to play in the First Round of next season. The teams ranked 6th and lower will relegate to Provincial Leagues.

=== Qualified teams ===
Teams which are eligible to play in this round are as follows:

Relegated from 2nd Division (1 Team):

- Machin Sazi Tabriz (Replaced by Moghavemat Tabriz)

Relegated from 3rd Division – 2nd Stage (9 Teams):

- Yazd Looleh (Replaced by Iman Sabz Shiraz)
- Moghavemat Astara (Renamed to Moghavemant Gilan)
- Parsa San'at Shargh Khorasan Jonoobi
- Oghab Tabriz
- Novin Keshavarz Aliabad (Replaced by Mehr Razavi Torbat Heydarieh)
- Khorram Kesht Aflak Khorramabad (Replaced by Malavan Tehran)
- Perspolis Shiraz
- Mardan Pasha Alborz
- Avalan Kamyaran

Remaining from 3rd Division – 1st Stage (18 Teams):

- Vahdat Aghasht (Replaced by Abar Sang Amol)
- Shahin Gorji Mahale Behshahr
- Yaran Hadi Norouzi (Replaced by Academy Alireza Ghaemshahr)
- Pas Gilan
- Samit No Qazvin (Replaced by ?)
- Shahrdari Ghaemshahr
- Vahdat Roodbar (Replaced by ?)
- Damash Parseh Tehran (Replaced by Mehr Khalij Tehran)
- Sardar Zarand Malayer
- Yadavaran Dokoohe Andimeshk (Replaced by Behbahan)
- Naft o Gaz Gachsaran (Replaced by Naft o Gaz Ahvaz)
- Perspolis Borazjan (Replaced by Sorkhpooshan Borazjan)
- Esteghlal Shoosh
- Shayan Dizel Fars (Replaced by Sepahan Novin Izeh)
- Poolad Oxin Izeh (Replaced by ?)
- Poshtibani Nezaja Mashhad
- Arian Sepand Tehran (Replaced by ?)
- Moghavemat Tehran
- Etehad Ghale-Raeisi (Replaced by Etehad Tayebi)
- Montakhab Kazroon (Replaced by Adrin Bahr Kazroon)

Promoted from Provincial Leagues (34 Teams):

- Shohadaye Chaharbagh (Alborz)
- Kesht o San'at Padyab (Ardebil)
- Ettehad Mohammadyar (Azarbayejan Gharbi)
- Shahriar Tabriz (Azarbayejan Sharghi) (Replaced by Lachin Center Jolfa)
- Gosar Jabri Boushehr (Boushehr)
- Shahin Lordegan (Chaharmahal & Bakhtiyari)
- Oghab Shiraz (Fars)
- Omid Taze Abad Chaf (Gilan)
- Shahid Asiayi Kalaleh (Golestan)
- Alvand Novin Hamedan (Hamedan)
- Sibeh Koukhard Bastak (Hormozgan)
- Mehrgan Darrehshahr (Ilam)
- Abipooshan Kashan (Isfahan)
- Mes Novin Rafsanjan (Kerman)
- Shahin Sahneh (Kermanshah)
- Sepahan Birjand (Khorasan Jonoubi)
- Sefidjamegan Mashhad (Khorasan Razavi)
- Payam Entezar Bojnoord (Khorasan Shomali)
- Keshavarz Dezfoul (Khouzestan)
- Shahin Kish (Kish)
- Tam Boyer Ahmad (Kohgiluye & Boyer Ahmad)
- Shahrdari Marivan (Kordestan)
- Sorkhabi Khoram Abad (Lorestan)
- Aluminium B Arak (Markazi)
- Montakhab Gharakhil (Mazandaran)
- Talayedaran Boyin Zahra (Qazvin)
- Novino Qom (Qom)
- Chala Sangsar (Semnan)
- Saravan (Sistan & Balouchestan)
- Adak Kian Payetakht (Tehran) (Renamed to Boland Paye Yadman)
- Mahoor Rey (Tehran's runner-up) (Replaced by Golchon Robat Karim)
- Batis Tehran (Tehran Suburbs)
- Sang Ahan Bafgh (Yazd)
- Zanjanroud Zanjan (Zanjan)

Free Slots (21 Teams):

- Armanpolis Sepidar (Chaharmahal & Bakhtiyari's runner-up)
- Ershad Novin Galedar (Fars's runner-up)
- Tam Parseh Hasht Behesht Isfahan (Isfahan's runner-up)
- Azar San'at Golpayegan (Isfahan's 3rd Placed team)
- Donyaye Toyour Abhar (Zanjan's runner-up)
- Azarbayejan Gharbi's Representative
- Shahin Tehran
- Payam Kosar Iraninan Tehran
- Abipooshan Roshan Tehran
- Damash Shahriar
- Zahedan's Representative
- Setaregan Abadeh
- Naft o Gaz Zagros
- Malavan Mokran Sirjan
- Setaregan 81 Kermanshah
- Shahin Bahmaei
- Aseman Golestan
- Kheybar Novin Khoramabad
- Setareh Shahr Mahmoodabad
- Shahrdari Ardebil
- Amiran Damghan

=== Stadia and locations ===
Location of teams of the 2023–24 Iran 3rd Division first stage
Brown: Group A; Red: Group B; Orange: Group C; Yellow: Group D;
Green: Group E; Blue: Group F.

=== Group A (North and East) ===
==== Table ====
Pos	Team	Pld	W	D	L	GF	GA	GD	Pts	Qualification or relegation
1	Chala Sangsar (Q)	12	8	3	1	18	8	+10	27	Promotion to Second Stage
2	Aseman Golestan (Q)	12	7	5	0	19	4	+15	26 (Note: Aseman Golestan and Montakhab Gharakhil are tied on head-to-head results. Thus they ranked by total goal difference.)	Promotion to Second Stage
3	Montakhab Gharakhil	12	8	2	2	24	11	+13	26	
4	Academy Alireza Ghaemshahr	12	6	3	3	22	9	+13	21	
5	Payam Kosar Iranian	12	6	2	4	22	11	+11	20 (Note: Payam Kosar Iranian are ahead of Poshtibani Nezaja Mashhad based on head-to-head points: Payam Kosar Iranian:3, Poshtibani Nezaja Mashhad:0.)	
6	Poshtibani Nezaja Mashhad (R)	12	6	2	4	21	15	+6	20	Relegation to Provincial Leagues 2024–25
7	Mehr Razavi Mashhad (R)	12	4	5	3	14	15	−1	17	Relegation to Provincial Leagues 2024–25
8	Moghavemat Tehran (R)	12	4	3	5	13	17	−4	15	Relegation to Provincial Leagues 2024–25
9	Setareh Shahr Mahmood Abad (R)	12	2	6	4	14	13	+1	12 (Note: Setareh Shahr Mahmood Abad and Malavan Tehran are tied on head-to-head results. Thus they ranked by total goal difference.)	Relegation to Provincial Leagues 2024–25
10	Malavan Tehran (R)	12	3	3	6	11	14	−3	12	Relegation to Provincial Leagues 2024–25
11	Damash Shahriar (R)	12	2	2	8	8	22	−14	8	Relegation to Provincial Leagues 2024–25
12	Amiran Damghan (R)	12	2	1	9	12	24	−12	7	Relegation to Provincial Leagues 2024–25
13	Payam Entezar Bojnoord (R)	12	1	1	10	6	41	−35	4	Relegation to Provincial Leagues 2024–25
14	Shahid Asiayi Kalaleh (E)	0	0	0	0	0	0	0	0	Withdrew

Rules for classification: 1) Points; 2) Head-to-head points; 3) Head-to-head goal difference; 4) Head-to-head goals scored; 5) Goal difference; 6) Goals scored; 7) Play-off at neutral venue.
(Note: Head-to-head record is used only after all the matches between the teams in question have been played).

==== Results ====
Home \ Away	A01	A02	A03	A04	A05	A06	A07	A08	A09	A10	A11	A12	A13	A14
Poshtibani Nezaja Mashhad	—			0–0	3–0 (Note: Damash Shahriar did not show up on the field.)			3–1	2–0			2–1	– (Note: Shahid Asiayi Kalaleh withdrew from the league.)	2–1
Montakhab Gharakhil	3–2	—			2–1	1–0			4–1	1–1			–	
Chala Sangsar	1–3	2–0	—			1–0	1–0			0–0	2–1			
Malavan Tehran		0–1	1–3	—			1–2	1–0			2–1	2–2		1–1
Damash Shahriar			0–3 (Note: Damash used an ineligible player and with the decision of the Disciplinary Committee, the game result was declared a 3-0 lost for them. The match result was 0–0 before the decision of the Disciplinary Committee.)	0–3	—			3–0 (Note: Payam Entezar Bojnoord did not show up on the field.)	0–0			1–0	–	
Payam Kosar Iranian	2–1			2–0	1–1	—			3–0 (Note: Mehr Razavi Torbat Heydarieh did not show up on the field.)	1–2			–	
Moghavemat Tehran	2–2	2–2			2–1	0–3 (Note: Moghavemat Tehran did not submit on time.)	—			0–1	2–0			2–1
Payam Entezar Bojnoord		0–6	0–0			1–4	3–0 (Note: Moghavemat Tehran did not show up on the field.)	—			0–8	0–1		
Mehr Razavi Torbat Heydarieh			2–2	1–0			1–0	5–1	—			2–2	–	1–0
Aseman Golestan	3–1			1–0	3–0			6–0	1–1	—			–	1–0
Academy Alireza Ghaemshahr	1–0	1–0			3–0	3–0			0–0	0–0	—			
Setareh Shahr Mahmood Abad		0–1	0–1			1–1	1–1			0–0	2–2	—		4–0
Shahid Asiayi Kalaleh			–	–			–	–			–	–	—	
Amiran Damghan		1–3	1–2		2–1	0–5		4–0			1–2		–	—

Legend: Blue = home team win; Yellow = draw; Red = away team win.

=== Group B (North and East) ===
==== Table ====
Pos	Team	Pld	W	D	L	GF	GA	GD	Pts	Qualification or relegation
1	Golchin Robat Karim (Q)	12	8	3	1	19	9	+10	27	Promotion to Second Stage
2	Mehr Khalij Tehran (Q)	12	7	4	1	20	6	+14	25 (Note: Mehr Khalij Tehran are ahead of Shadkam Mashhad based on head-to-head points: Mehr Khalij Tehran: 3, Shadkam Mashhad: 0.)	Promotion to Second Stage
3	Shadkam Mashhad	12	7	4	1	15	3	+12	25	
4	Batis Tehran	12	5	6	1	10	4	+6	21	
5	Shahrdari Ghaemshahr	12	5	5	2	16	7	+9	20 (Note: Shahrdari Ghaemshahr are ahead of Abipooshan Kashan based on head-to-head points: Shahrdari Ghaemshahr: 3, Abipooshan Kashan: 0.)	
6	Abipooshan Kashan (R)	12	6	2	4	15	11	+4	20	Relegation to Provincial Leagues 2024–25
7	Shohadaye Chaharbagh (R)	12	4	5	3	10	6	+4	17 (Note: Sefidjamegan Mashhad and Shohadaye Chaharbagh are tied on head-to-head results. Thus they ranked by total goal difference.)	Relegation to Provincial Leagues 2024–25
8	Sefidjamegan Mashhad (R)	12	4	5	3	12	12	0	17	Relegation to Provincial Leagues 2024–25
9	Novino Qom (R)	12	4	2	6	8	16	−8	14	Relegation to Provincial Leagues 2024–25
10	Shahin Gorji Mahale Behshahr (R)	12	3	2	7	12	18	−6	11	Relegation to Provincial Leagues 2024–25
11	Abar Sang Amol (R)	12	1	4	7	5	17	−12	7 (Note: Abar Sang Amol and Abipooshan Roshan Tehran are tied on head-to-head results. Thus they ranked by total goal difference.)	Relegation to Provincial Leagues 2024–25
12	Abipooshan Roshan Tehran (R)	12	2	1	9	6	19	−13	7	Relegation to Provincial Leagues 2024–25
13	Mardan Pasha Alborz (R)	12	0	1	11	7	27	−20	1	Relegation to Provincial Leagues 2024–25

Rules for classification: 1) Points; 2) Head-to-head points; 3) Head-to-head goal difference; 4) Head-to-head goals scored; 5) Goal difference; 6) Goals scored; 7) Play-off at neutral venue.
(Note: Head-to-head record is used only after all the matches between the teams in question have been played).

==== Results ====
Home \ Away	B01	B02	B03	B04	B05	B06	B07	B08	B09	B10	B11	B12	B13
Mardan Pasha Alborz	—			0–1	1–2			0–3	0–1			0–2	1–1
Abar Sang Amol	2–1	—			0–1	0–0			0–1	1–1			0–3 (Note: Abar Sang Amol did not show up at the field.)
Novino Qom	3–0 (Note: Mardan Pasha Alborz did not show up at the field.)	1–0	—			1–0	0–3			0–0	0–3		
Batis Tehran		3–0	1–1	—			0–1	1–0			0–0	2–1	
Mehr Khalij Tehran			3–0 (Note: The match was stopeed due to Novino's objections against the refree and awarded 3–0 to the Mehr Khalij.)	1–1	—			3–0	0–0			5–0	1–0
Abipooshan Roshan Tehran	2–1			0–1	2–3	—			0–3 (Note: Abipooshan Roshan Tehran did not show up at the field.)	0–3			0–2
Golchin Robat Karim		1–0			1–1	1–0	—			1–0	1–1		5–3
Abipooshan Kashan		3–0	2–1			2–0	2–1	—			0–0	2–1	
Shohadaye Chaharbagh			0–1	0–0			1–2	1–1	—			2–0	0–0
Sefidjamegan Mashhad	1–0			0–0	1–0			2–0	0–0	—			0–4 (Note: The match was stopeed due to lack of medical equipment in the ambulance and awarded 3–0 to Shadkam Mashhad by Disciplinary Committee, but Appeals Committee did not find the host team guily and the match replayed.)
Shahrdari Ghaemshahr	4–0	0–0			0–0	2–1			1–0	4–2	—		
Shahin Gorji Mahale Behshahr		2–2	3–0 (Note: Novino Qom did not show up at the field.)			0–1	0–1			1–1	2–1	—	
Shadkam Mashhad			1–0	0–0			1–1	1–0			1–0	1–0	—

Legend: Blue = home team win; Yellow = draw; Red = away team win.

=== Group C (North and East) ===
==== Table ====
Pos	Team	Pld	W	D	L	GF	GA	GD	Pts	Qualification or relegation
1	Omid Taze Abad Chaf (Q)	12	9	2	1	20	7	+13	29	Promotion to Second Stage
2	Shahin Tehran (Q)	12	8	2	2	25	12	+13	26	Promotion to Second Stage
3	Oghab Tabriz	12	7	4	1	23	7	+16	25	
4	Kesht o San'at Padyab	12	7	3	2	24	10	+14	24	
5	Shahrdari Ardebil	12	5	5	2	16	9	+7	20 (Note: Shahrdari Ardebil and Donyaye Toyour Abhar are tied on head-to-head results. Thus they ranked by total goal difference.)	
6	Donyaye Toyour Abhar (R)	12	6	2	4	18	15	+3	20	Relegation to Provincial Leagues 2024–25
7	Moghavemant Gilan (R)	12	4	3	5	13	16	−3	15	Relegation to Provincial Leagues 2024–25
8	Ettehad Mohammadyar (R)	12	4	2	6	14	19	−5	14 (Note: Ettehad Mohammadyar are ahead of Shahriar Tabriz based on head-to-head points: Ettehad Mohammadyar: 3, Shahriar Tabriz: 0.)	Relegation to Provincial Leagues 2024–25
9	Shahriar Tabriz (R)	12	4	2	6	16	21	−5	14	Relegation to Provincial Leagues 2024–25
10	Boland Paye Yadman (R)	12	3	2	7	14	21	−7	11	Relegation to Provincial Leagues 2024–25
11	Moghavemat Tabriz (R)	12	2	3	7	11	20	−9	9	Relegation to Provincial Leagues 2024–25
12	Pas Gilan (R)	12	2	1	9	13	23	−10	7	Relegation to Provincial Leagues 2024–25
13	Zanjanroud Zanjan (R)	12	1	1	10	7	34	−27	4	Relegation to Provincial Leagues 2024–25
14	Montakhab Urmia (E)	0	0	0	0	0	0	0	0	Withdrew

Rules for classification: 1) Points; 2) Head-to-head points; 3) Head-to-head goal difference; 4) Head-to-head goals scored; 5) Goal difference; 6) Goals scored; 7) Play-off at neutral venue.
(Note: Head-to-head record is used only after all the matches between the teams in question have been played).

==== Results ====
Home \ Away	C01	C02	C03	C04	C05	C06	C07	C08	C09	C10	C11	C12	C13	C14
Shahin Tehran	—			4–0	2–1			2–1	3–1			2–1	4–0	3–2
Omid Taze Abad Chaf	1–1	—			4–1	– (Note: Montakhab Urmia withdrew from the league.)			1–0	2–0			3–0 (Note: Zanjanroud Zanjan did not show up at the field.)	
Oghab Tabriz	1–1	1–2	—			–	1–1			3–0 (Note: Donyaye Toyour Abhar did not submit on time.)	3–1			3–0
Shahriar Tabriz		1–2	1–1	—			1–4	2–0			3–0 (Note: Pas Gilan did not show up at the field.)	4–2		1–1
Ettehad Mohammadyar			0–0	2–1	—			3–0 (Note: Moghavemat Tabriz did not submit on time.)	1–0			1–2	0–0	
Montakhab Urmia	–			–	–	—			–	–			–	–
Kesht o San'at Padyab	1–2	1–0			3–1	–	—				2–0			
Moghavemat Tabriz		0–1	0–2			–	2–2	—			2–1	0–1		0–0
Boland Paye Yadman			1–2	3–0 (Note: Shahriar Tabriz did not submit on time.)			0–3	1–1	—			3–1	2–1	
Donyaye Toyour Abhar	1–0			1–2	3–2			3–0	3–1	—			3–0	0–0
Pas Gilan	2–1	0–1			1–2	–			2–2	2–3	—			
Moghavemant Gilan		1–2	0–1			–	0–0			0–0	2–1	—		1–1
Zanjanroud Zanjan			0–5	1–0			1–4	2–5			1–3	1–2	—	
Shahrdari Ardebil		1–1			3–0		1–0		3–0		1–0		3–0 (Note: Zanjanroud Zanjan did not submit on time.)	—

Legend: Blue = home team win; Yellow = draw; Red = away team win.

=== Group D (South and West) ===
==== Table ====
Pos	Team	Pld	W	D	L	GF	GA	GD	Pts	Qualification or relegation
1	Setaregan Abipoosh Zeydoon (Q)	13	8	5	0	20	7	+13	29	Promotion to Second Stage
2	Kheybar Novin Khoram Abad (Q)	13	8	4	1	28	5	+23	28	Promotion to Second Stage
3	Keshavarz Dezfoul	13	7	5	1	17	8	+9	26	
4	Aluminium B Arak	13	8	1	4	25	13	+12	25	
5	Setaregan Abadeh	13	5	5	3	18	11	+7	20	
6	Mehrgan Darrehshahr (R)	13	5	4	4	14	12	+2	19	Relegation to Provincial Leagues 2024–25
7	Setaregan 81 Kermanshah (R)	13	5	3	5	22	23	−1	18	Relegation to Provincial Leagues 2024–25
8	Talayedaran Boyin Zahra (R)	13	4	5	4	21	23	−2	17	Relegation to Provincial Leagues 2024–25
9	Alvand Novin Hamedan (R)	13	4	3	6	14	15	−1	15	Relegation to Provincial Leagues 2024–25
10	Sorkhabi Khoram Abad (R)	13	3	5	5	16	22	−6	14	Relegation to Provincial Leagues 2024–25
11	Shahin Sahneh (R)	13	3	4	6	15	22	−7	13	Relegation to Provincial Leagues 2024–25
12	Shahrdari Marivan (R)	13	3	3	7	11	21	−10	12	Relegation to Provincial Leagues 2024–25
13	Sepahan Doroud (R)	13	1	6	6	11	18	−7	9	Relegation to Provincial Leagues 2024–25
14	Sardar Zand Malayer (E) (Note: Sardar Zand Malayer did not participate in two matches and therefore disqualified from the league and punished by two-level-relegation.)	13	0	1	12	1	33	−32	1	Withdrew

Rules for classification: 1) Points; 2) Head-to-head points; 3) Head-to-head goal difference; 4) Head-to-head goals scored; 5) Goal difference; 6) Goals scored; 7) Play-off at neutral venue.
(Note: Head-to-head record is used only after all the matches between the teams in question have been played).

==== Results ====
Home \ Away	D01	D02	D03	D04	D05	D06	D07	D08	D09	D10	D11	D12	D13	D14
Sardar Zand Malayer	—			0–3	0–3 (Note: Sardar Zand Malayer did not participate in two matches and therefore disqualified from the league and their remaining matches considered as 3–0 loss.)			0–3 (Note: Sardar Zand used an ineligible player and with the decision of the Disciplinary Committee, the game result was declared a 3-0 lost for them. The match result was 2–0 before the decision of the Disciplinary Committee.)	0–3			1–2	0–3 (Note: Sardar Zand Malayer did not show up on the field.)	
Aluminium B Arak	3–0 (Note: Sardar Zand Malayer did not show up on the field.)	—			0–0	4–0			2–0	1–0			2–3	3–1
Kheybar Novin Khoram Abad	3–0	4–0	—			3–0	5–1			3–0 (Note: Sepahan Doroud did not submit on time.)	4–0			
Sorkhabi Khoram Abad		0–4	1–1	—			2–1	0–1			3–0 (Note: Shahrdari Marivan did not show up on the field.)	0–0		3–3
Shahin Sahneh			1–0	2–2	—			3–0	1–1			0–4	1–1	
Setaregan 81 Kermanshah	1–0			4–0	3–2	—			5–1	2–1			1–1	0–3
Mehrgan Darrehshahr	3–0	0–2			1–0	2–1	—			3–0	2–0			
Setaregan Abadeh		0–1	1–1			3–2	0–0	—			1–0	2–2		7–1
Alvand Novin Hamedan			0–1	4–1			1–1	0–0	—			0–1	0–2	
Sepahan Doroud	0–0			1–1	7–2			0–0	0–3	—			1–1	1–1
Shahrdari Marivan	3–0	3–2			1–0	1–1			0–1	0–0	—			
Setaregan Abipoosh Zeydoon		2–1	0–0			2–2	1–0			1–0	3–0	—		2–1
Keshavarz Dezfoul			0–2	1–0			0–0	1–0			1–0	0–0	—	
Talayedaran Boyin Zahra	3–0		1–1		2–0		0–0		1–0		3–3		1–3	—

Legend: Blue = home team win; Yellow = draw; Red = away team win.

=== Group E (South and West) ===
==== Table ====
Pos	Team	Pld	W	D	L	GF	GA	GD	Pts	Qualification or relegation
1	Tam Boyer Ahmad (Q)	11	7	2	2	16	9	+7	23	Promotion to Second Stage
2	Ettehad Tayyebi (Q)	11	6	4	1	15	4	+11	22 (Note: Ettehad Tayyebi are ahead of Sorkhpooshan Borazjan based on head-to-head points: Ettehad Tayyebi 3, Sorkhpooshan Borazjan 0.)	Promotion to Second Stage
3	Sorkhpooshan Borazjan	11	7	1	3	16	12	+4	22	
4	Shahin Bahmaei	11	5	3	3	12	9	+3	18 (Note: Shahin Bahmaei, Sepahan Novin Izeh and Gosar Jabri Boushehr are ranked based on Head-to-head points: Shahin Bahmaei 6, Sepahan Novin Izeh 3, Gosar Jabri Boushehr 0.)	
5	Sepahan Novin Izeh	11	5	3	3	13	9	+4	18	
6	Azar San'at Golpayegan (R)	11	5	2	4	10	11	−1	17	Relegation to Provincial Leagues 2024–25
7	Gosar Jabri Boushehr (R)	11	5	0	6	14	14	0	15	Relegation to Provincial Leagues 2024–25
8	Esteghlal Shoosh (R)	11	4	2	5	12	16	−4	14	Relegation to Provincial Leagues 2024–25
9	Naft Ahvaz (R)	11	3	3	5	10	10	0	12	Relegation to Provincial Leagues 2024–25
10	Ershad Novin Galedar (R)	11	3	2	6	6	8	−2	11	Relegation to Provincial Leagues 2024–25
11	Adrin Bahr Kazroon (R)	11	2	2	7	9	20	−11	8	Relegation to Provincial Leagues 2024–25
12	Shahin Lordegan (R)	11	1	2	8	7	18	−11	5	Relegation to Provincial Leagues 2024–25
13	Behbahan (E)	0	0	0	0	0	0	0	0	Withdrew

Rules for classification: 1) Points; 2) Head-to-head points; 3) Head-to-head goal difference; 4) Head-to-head goals scored; 5) Goal difference; 6) Goals scored; 7) Play-off at neutral venue.
(Note: Head-to-head record is used only after all the matches between the teams in question have been played).

==== Results ====
Home \ Away	E01	E02	E03	E04	E05	E06	E07	E08	E09	E10	E11	E12	E13
Shahin Lordegan	—			– (Note: Behbahan withdrew from the league.)	1–2			1–0	1–1			1–1	2–4
Ettehad Tayyebi	1–0	—			4–3	0–0			2–0	2–0			3–0
Azar San'at Golpayegan	1–0	0–3 (Note: Azar San'at used an ineligible player and with the decision of the Disciplinary Committee, the game result was declared a 3-0 lost for them. The match result was 0–0 before the decision of the Disciplinary Committee.)	—			2–1	1–0			2–1	3–0		
Behbahan		–	–	—			–	–			–	–	
Esteghlal Shoosh			1–1	–	—			1–0	2–1			1–0	1–1
Sepahan Novin Izeh	1–0			–	2–1	—			3–0 (Note: Adrin Bahr Kazroon did not show up at the field.)	2–0			1–0
Naft o Gaz Ahvaz	2–1	0–0			2–0	0–0	—			1–2	3–0		
Ershad Novin Galedar		0–0	0–0			1–0	3–1	—			0–1	1–0	
Adrin Bahr Kazroon			2–0	–			0–0	2–1	—			2–3	1–2
Gosar Jabri Boushehr	3–0			–	3–0			1–0	3–0	—			1–2
Tam Boyer Ahmad	2–0	1–0			1–0 (Note: Tam Boyer Ahmad used an ineligible player and with the decision of the Disciplinary Committee, the game result was declared a 3–0 loss for them, but the Appeals Committee did not find them guilty and the original result returned into account.)	1–1			3–0	4–0 (Note: Tam Boyer Ahmad used an ineligible player and with the decision of the Disciplinary Committee, the game result was declared a 3–0 loss for them, but the Appeals Committee did not find them guilty and the original result returned into account.)	—		
Shahin Bahmaei		0–0	1–0			4–2	1–0			1–0	1–1	—	
Sorkhpooshan Borazjan			2–0	–			2–1	1–0			1–2	1–0	—

Legend: Blue = home team win; Yellow = draw; Red = away team win.

=== Group F (South and West) ===
==== Table ====
Pos	Team	Pld	W	D	L	GF	GA	GD	Pts	Qualification or relegation
1	Iman Sabz Shiraz (Q)	11	8	2	1	20	6	+14	26	Promotion to Second Stage
2	Naft o Gaz Zagros (Q)	11	6	4	1	14	6	+8	22	Promotion to Second Stage
3	Mes Novin Rafsanjan	11	5	3	3	11	6	+5	18	
4	Sibeh Koukhard Bastak	11	5	2	4	14	14	0	17	
5	Sepahan Birjand	11	5	1	5	13	10	+3	16	
6	Bakhshan Saravan (R)	11	4	3	4	10	12	−2	15 (Note: Bakhshan Saravan and Shahin Kish are tied on head-to-head results and overall results. Thus they both shared rank 6)	Relegation to Provincial Leagues 2024–25
7	Shahin Kish (R)	11	4	3	4	10	12	−2	15	Relegation to Provincial Leagues 2024–25
8	Tam Parseh Hasht Behesht Isfahan (R)	11	3	5	3	10	10	0	14 (Note: Tam Parseh Hasht Behesht Isfahan are ahead of Poshtibani Nezaja Mashhad based on head-to-head points: Tam Parseh Hasht Behesht Isfahan: 3, Sang Ahan Bafgh:0.)	Relegation to Provincial Leagues 2024–25
9	Sang Ahan Bafgh (R)	11	4	2	5	15	15	0	14	Relegation to Provincial Leagues 2024–25
10	Zahedan's Representative (R)	11	3	3	5	8	12	−4	12	Relegation to Provincial Leagues 2024–25
11	Oghab Shiraz (R)	10	1	3	6	4	12	−8	6	Relegation to Provincial Leagues 2024–25
12	Perspolis Shiraz (R)	10	0	3	7	4	16	−12	3	Relegation to Provincial Leagues 2024–25
13	Malavan Mokran Sirjan (E)	0	0	0	0	0	0	0	0	Withdrew

Rules for classification: 1) Points; 2) Head-to-head points; 3) Head-to-head goal difference; 4) Head-to-head goals scored; 5) Goal difference; 6) Goals scored; 7) Play-off at neutral venue.
(Note: Head-to-head record is used only after all the matches between the teams in question have been played).

==== Results ====
Home \ Away	F01	F02	F03	F04	F05	F06	F07	F08	F09	F10	F11	F12	F13
Zahedan's Representative	—			1–1	3–0 (Note: Iman Sabz Shiraz did not show up on the field.)			1–0	2–1			0–1	0–0
Sang Ahan Bafgh	2–0	—			2–3	3–1			4–0	– (Note: Malavan Mokran Sirjan withdrew from the league.)			0–1
Sibeh Koukhard Bastak	3–0 (Note: Zahedan's Representative did not show up on the field.)	3–2	—			0–0	1–0			–	1–1		
Naft o Gaz Zagros		0–0	1–0	—			2–0	1–0			2–0	3–1	
Iman Sabz Shiraz			3–1	1–1	—			2–0	2–0			3–0 (Note: Shahin Kish did not show up on the field.)	1–0
Perspolis Shiraz	1–1			1–1	0–2	—			1–2	–			0–2
Oghab Shiraz	2–0	0–1			0–2	Both 0-3 (Note: Both Oghab Shiraz and Perspolis Shiraz did not submit on time and the result considered 3–0 loss to both teams.)	—			–	1–1		
Sepahan Birjand		4–1	3–1			2–0	3–0 (Note: Oghab Shiraz did not show up on the field.)	—			0–0	1–0	
Bakhshan Saravan			2–0	1–2			1–0	2–0	—			1–1	0–0
Malavan Mokran Sirjan	–			–	–			–	–	—			–
Tam Parseh Hasht Behesht Isfahan	1–0	3–0			1–1	2–0			0–0	–	—		
Shahin Kish		0–0	1–2			1–0	1–1			–	2–0	—	
Mes Novin Rafsanjan			1–2	1–0			0–0	2–0			3–1	1–2	—

Legend: Blue = home team win; Yellow = draw; Red = away team win.

=== Ranking of third-placed teams (North and East) ===
Pos	Grp	Team	Pld	W	D	L	GF	GA	GD	Pts	Qualification or relegation
1	A	Montakhab Gharakhil (Q)	12	8	2	2	24	11	+13	26	Promotion to Second Stage
2	C	Oghab Tabriz	12	7	4	1	23	7	+16	25	
3	B	Shadkam Mashhad	12	7	4	1	15	3	+12	25	

Rules for classification: 1) Points; 2) Goal difference; 3) Goals scored; 4) Play-off at neutral venue.

=== Ranking of third-placed teams (South and West) ===
Pos	Grp	Team	Pld	W	D	L	GF	GA	GD	Pts	Qualification or relegation
1	D	Keshavarz Dezfoul (Q)	11	6	4	1	13	7	+6	22	Promotion to Second Stage
2	E	Sorkhpooshan Borazjan	11	7	1	3	16	12	+4	22	
3	F	Mes Novin Rafsanjan	11	5	3	3	11	6	+5	18	

Rules for classification: 1) Points; 2) Goal difference; 3) Goals scored; 4) Play-off at neutral venue.

=== Ranking of sixth-placed teams (North and East) ===
Pos	Grp	Team	Pld	W	D	L	GF	GA	GD	Pts	Qualification or relegation
1	A	Poshtibani Nezaja Mashhad	12	6	2	4	21	15	+6	20	Remained in 3rd Division - 1st Stage 2024–25 after relegation (Note: All sixth-placed teams should relegate to Povincal Leagues. But due to promotion of Montakhab Gharakhil (after elimination of Vista toorbin Tehran in 2nd stage), the best sixth-placed team in North and East region, remained in 3rd Division - 1st Stage and not relegated.)
2	B	Abipooshan Kashan	12	6	2	4	15	11	+4	20	Relegation to Provincial Leagues 2024–25
3	C	Donyaye Toyour Abhar	12	6	2	4	18	15	+3	20	Relegation to Provincial Leagues 2024–25

Rules for classification: 1) Points; 2) Goal difference; 3) Goals scored; 4) Play-off at neutral venue.

=== Ranking of sixth-placed teams (South and West) ===
Pos	Grp	Team	Pld	W	D	L	GF	GA	GD	Pts	Qualification or relegation
1	E	Azar San'at Golpayegan	11	5	2	4	10	11	−1	17	Remained in 3rd Division - 1st Stage 2024–25 after relegation (Note: All sixth-placed teams should relegate to Povincal Leagues. But due to promotion of Montakhab Gharakhil (after elimination of Vista toorbin Tehran in 2nd stage), the best sixth-placed team in South and West region, remained in 3rd Division - 1st Stage and not relegated.)
2	F	Bakhshan Saravan	11	4	3	4	10	12	−2	15	Relegation to Provincial Leagues 2024–25
3	D	Mehrgan Darrehshahr	11	3	4	4	8	12	−4	13	Relegation to Provincial Leagues 2024–25

Rules for classification: 1) Points; 2) Goal difference; 3) Goals scored; 4) Play-off at neutral venue.

== Second stage ==
In this stage, 12 teams who qualified from 1st stage and 4 teams who received a slot by FFIRI will join to 17 remaining teams from previous season and 3 relegated teams from 1st and 2nd division (total 36 teams). Teams will be divided into 3 groups of 12 teams each and play a round-robin home and away matches. The promotion and relegation rules at first was announced as below: "The winner and runner-up of each group will promote to 2nd division. The 4 bottom clubs in each group will relegate to newly established 4th division." But furing the season, FFIRI announced the new rules for promotion and relegation at this season of 3rd Division: "The winner of each group will promote to 2nd division (Total 3 teams). The runners-up and the best 3rd-ranked team among the groups (total 4 teams) will advance to play-off stage. No team will relegate to belower league at this season.

=== Qualified teams ===
Relegated from 1st Division (1 Team):

- Malavan Mokran Sirjan)

Relegated from 2nd Division (2 Teams):

- Vista Toorbin Tehran (Could not submit on time and eliminated)
- Mes Novin Kerman

Remaining Teams from last season (17 Teams):

- Shayan Dizel Fars
- Sepahan Novin Isfahan
- Rakhsh Khodro Tabriz
- Shahrdari Fooman
- Shadkam Mashhad
- Nika Pars Chaloos
- Harang Javan Bastak
- Malavan B Anzali
- Shariat Novin Mashhad
- Parsa Baghmalek (Replaced by Salehin Tehran)
- KIA Tehran
- Naft Omidiyeh
- Setare Ettehad Tabriz
- Setaregan Sorkh Tehran (Replaced by Fard Alborz)
- Iranjavan Boushehr
- Oghab Tehran
- Parsian Tehran

Promoted from 1st Stage (12 Teams):

- Chala Sangsar
- Golchin Robat Karim
- Omid Taze Abad Chaf
- Esteghlal Zeydoon
- Tam Boyer Ahmad
- Iman Sabz Shiraz
- Aseman Golestan
- Mehr Khalij Tehran
- Shahin Tehran
- Kheybar Novin Khoram Abad
- Ettehad Tayebi
- Naft o Gaz Zagros

Free Slots (4 Teams):

- Omid Vahdat Mashhad (Replaced by Aramesh Khoshhal Mashhad)
- Abidar Sanandaj
- San'at Naft Ilam
- Mantaghe Azad Kish (Could not submit on time and eliminated)

Replaced teams: Due to elimination of some teams before the start of the second round, best third ranked teams from 1st stage, replaced instead of Vista Toorbin Tehran and Mantaghe Azad Kish.

- Montakhab Gharakhil (Instead of Vista Toorbin Tehran)
- Keshavarz Dezfool (Instead of Mantaghe Azad Kish)

=== Stadia and locations ===
Location of teams of the 2023–24 Iran 3rd Division second stage
Red: Group 1; Green: Group 2; Blue: Group 3.
Pink: Eliminated Teams.

=== Group 1 ===
Pos	Team	Pld	W	D	L	GF	GA	GD	Pts	Qualification or relegation
1	Oghab Tehran (Q)	22	12	7	3	34	15	+19	43	Promotion to 2024-25 Iran Football's 2nd Division
2	Sepahan Novin Isfahan (A)	22	12	6	4	42	18	+24	42	Promotion to Play-off
3	Mehr Khalij Tehran (A)	22	13	1	8	42	26	+16	40	Promotion to Play-off
4	Parsian Tehran	22	11	5	6	30	21	+9	38	
5	Shadkam Mashhad	22	8	7	7	21	18	+3	31	
6	Fard Alborz	22	9	4	9	23	30	−7	31	
7	Aseman Golestan	22	7	9	6	21	22	−1	30	
8	Khorshid Talayi Chaloos	22	7	7	8	23	25	−2	28	
9	Montakhab Gharakhil	22	8	4	10	27	33	−6	28	
10	Chala Sangsar	22	7	6	9	24	26	−2	27	
11	Aramesh Khoshhal Mashhad	22	6	6	10	28	35	−7	24	
12	Shariat Novin Mashhad	22	0	2	20	6	52	−46	2	

Updated to match(es) played on 20 July 2024. Source:
Rules for classification: 1) Points; 2) Head-to-head points; 3) Head-to-head goal difference; 4) Head-to-head goals scored; 5) Goal difference; 6) Goals scored; 7) Play-off at neutral venue.
(Note: Head-to-head record is used only after all the matches between the teams in question have been played).

Home \ Away	PAR	CHA	FAR	MGH	SHA	SNM	AKM	SEP	MKT	OGH	ASE	KTC
Parsian Tehran	—	1–0	5–1	2–1	1–0	1–0	3–1	3–1	3–1	0–0	0–0	0–0
Chala Sangsar	0–2	—	1–0	1–2	0–0	3–0	1–0	2–2	2–1	3–2	1–1	1–0
Fard Alborz	1–0	0–0	—	6–1	1–0	1–0	3–2	1–0	0–1	0–0	0–0	3–1
Montakhab Gharakhil	1–0	3–2	2–1	—	2–2	2–0	1–1	2–2	1–0	1–2	1–2	2–1
Shadkaam Mashhad	2–1	1–0	2–3	2–1	—	1–0	1–1	1–2	0–0	0–2	0–0	3–0
Shariat Novin Mashhad	0–2	1–1	0–2	1–2	0–2	—	1–2	0–4	0–3	0–0	1–2	0–3
Aramesh Khoshhal Mashhad	1–2	2–2	3–0	1–0	0–1	3–0 (Note: Shariat Novin Mashhad did not submit on time.)	—	0–2	1–0	3–1	3–1	1–1
Sepahan Novin Isfahan	1–1	2–0	6–0	1–0	1–0	3–0	0–0	—	5–0	0–0	3–0	1–0
Mehr Khalij Tehran	1–0	3–2	3–0	1–0	1–2	7–0	6–1	2–1	—	0–2	4–2	3–2
Oghab Tehran	5–1	1–0	0–0	1–0	0–0	6–2	3–2	4–1	0–1	—	1–0	2–0
Aseman Golestan	2–0	0–1	1–0	2–2	1–1	1–0	2–0	0–0	2–1	1–2	—	1–1
Khorshid Talayi Chaloos	0–0	2–1	2–0	2–0	1–0	1–0	1–1	2–4	1–0	0–0	0–0	—

Updated to match(es) played on 20 July 2024. Source:
Legend: Blue = home team win; Yellow = draw; Red = away team win.

=== Group 2 ===
Pos	Team	Pld	W	D	L	GF	GA	GD	Pts	Qualification or relegation
1	Shahin Tehran (Q)	22	12	6	4	30	19	+11	42	Promotion to 2024-25 Iran Football's 2nd Division
2	Golchin Robat Karim	22	11	7	4	29	19	+10	40	Promotion to Play-off
3	Salehin Tehran	22	12	3	7	37	26	+11	39	
4	Moghavemat (Rakhsh Khodro) Tabriz	22	11	2	9	39	31	+8	35	
5	Kheybar Novin Khoram Abad	22	9	5	8	35	27	+8	32	
6	KIA Tehran	22	7	7	8	25	27	−2	28	
7	Zist Sabz Tabriz	22	7	7	8	26	31	−5	28	
8	San'at Naft Ilam	22	7	6	9	24	24	0	27	
9	Omid Taze Abad Chaf	22	7	6	9	27	36	−9	27	
10	Shahrdari Fooman	22	5	7	10	24	31	−7	22	
11	Abidar Sanandaj	22	5	6	11	29	43	−14	21	
12	Malavan B Anzali	22	4	8	10	19	30	−11	20	

Updated to match(es) played on 20 July 2024. Source:
Rules for classification: 1) Points; 2) Head-to-head points; 3) Head-to-head goal difference; 4) Head-to-head goals scored; 5) Goal difference; 6) Goals scored; 7) Play-off at neutral venue.
(Note: Head-to-head record is used only after all the matches between the teams in question have been played).

Home \ Away	SAL	KNK	ABS	SHT	OTC	ETF	MAL	SNI	KIA	GRK	ZST	MOT
Salehin Tehran	—	1–4	4–2	0–1	3–0	2–1	3–1	5–1	3–0	1–1	1–0	0–1
Kheybar Novin Khoram Abad	1–2	—	1–1	1–1	1–2	3–2	2–0	2–0	0–0	3–1	2–2	2–0
Abidar Sanandaj	3–0	0–5	—	1–1	2–1	0–0	2–1	2–3	0–3	0–1	3–2	2–1
Shahin Tehran	3–1	0–2	2–1	—	4–1	1–1	1–0	1–1	2–1	0–0	3–0 (Note: The match between Shahin and Zist Sabz has been canceled after 38 minutes due to the objections of Zist Sabz Tabriz.)	1–0
Omid Taze Abad Chaf	1–1	3–2	1–0	0–1	—	4–0	1–0	1–0	1–1	0–1	1–1	4–2
Ettehad Fooman	0–3 (Note: Disciplinary. Result was 0-0.)	2–1	1–1	1–2	3–0	—	1–1	0–0	3–0	3–1	4–2	1–1
Malavan B Anzali	0–0	0–0	4–2	1–0	1–1	2–1	—	0–1	2–1	1–1	1–1	1–3
San'at Naft Ilam	0–1	3–1	0–0	0–1	3–3	3–0 (Note: Ettehad Fooman did not appear at the field.)	1–0	—	0–1	0–0	4–0	0–1
KIA Tehran	3–2	3–0 (Note: Disciplinary)	2–2	1–3	0–0	2–0	2–2	0–0	—	2–0	0–0	1–3
Golchin Robat Karim	2–0	2–0	2–0	1–1	2–0	1–0	2–0	3–2	2–0	—	2–2	3–1
Zist Sabz Tabriz	0–1	1–2	3–2	3–0	2–1	1–0	1–1	1–0	1–0	0–0	—	3–2
Moghavemat Tabriz	1–3	1–0	5–3	2–1	6–1	0–0	3–0	1–2	1–2	3–1	1–0	—

Updated to match(es) played on 20 July 2024. Source:
Legend: Blue = home team win; Yellow = draw; Red = away team win.

=== Group 3 ===
Pos	Team	Pld	W	D	L	GF	GA	GD	Pts	Qualification or relegation
1	Esteghlal Zeydoon(Q)	22	13	5	4	28	10	+18	44	Promotion to 2024-25 Iran Football's 2nd Division
2	Iranjavan Bushehr (A)	22	12	7	3	30	19	+11	43	Promotion to Play-off
3	Shayan Dizel Fars	22	11	7	4	24	12	+12	40	
4	Iman Sabz Shiraz	22	8	5	9	21	21	0	29	
5	Ettehad Tayebi	22	8	5	9	20	27	−7	29	
6	Naft Omidiyeh	22	6	10	6	25	20	+5	28	
7	Keshavarz Dezfool	22	8	3	11	20	27	−7	27	
8	Mes Novin Kerman	22	7	6	9	14	23	−9	27	
9	Harang Javan Bastak	22	6	8	8	19	20	−1	26	
10	Naft o Gaz Zagros	22	6	6	10	20	22	−2	24	
11	Tam Boyer Ahmad	22	6	6	10	13	24	−11	24	
12	Malavan Mokran Sirjan	22	5	4	13	21	30	−9	19	

Updated to match(es) played on 20 July 2024. Source:
Rules for classification: 1) Points; 2) Head-to-head points; 3) Head-to-head goal difference; 4) Head-to-head goals scored; 5) Goal difference; 6) Goals scored; 7) Play-off at neutral venue.
(Note: Head-to-head record is used only after all the matches between the teams in question have been played).

Home \ Away	HJB	KED	TBA	EGT	SDF	ISS	NGZ	IJB	NAF	SAZ	MMS	MNK
Harang Javan Bastak	—	2–1	0–1	1–1	0–0	1–1	2–0	2–2	1–0	1–2	1–1	2–0
Keshavarz Dezfool	2–1	—	1–0	1–0	1–0	1–0	0–1	1–3	2–2	0–0	2–0	0–1
Tam Boyer Ahmad	1–0	3–2	—	0–0	0–3 (Note: Tam Boyer Ahmad used an ineligible player. The result was 2-0.)	2–0	0–0	1–1	1–1	0–0	1–0	1–1
Ettehad Ghale Raesi Tayebi	1–0	0–1	0–1	—	1–1	1–0	1–0	2–1	2–1	1–0	1–0	5–1
Shayan Dizel Fars	2–0	3–1	2–0	2–0	—	1–1	1–0	1–1	1–1	1–0	1–0	1–0
Iman Sabz Shiraz	2–1	1–0	1–0	4–0	0–1	—	1–0	1–2	1–1	0–2	3–0 (Note: Malavan Mokran did not appear at the field.)	2–0
Naft o Gaz Zagros	0–0	2–1	2–0	4–2	0–0	0–0	—	2–3	1–1	3–0 (Note: disciplinary)	2–3	1–0
Iranjavan Bushehr	1–1	2–0	1–0	1–1	1–0	1–0	1–0	—	2–1	1–0	1–0	2–0
Naft Omidiyeh	0–1	1–0	3–0	0–0	1–1	3–1	2–1	2–2	—	0–1	1–0	1–2
Setaregan Abipoosh Zeydoon	1–0	0–0	2–0	3–0	2–0	3–0 (Note: The match was stopeed due to Iman Sabz's objections against the refree and awarded 3–0 to the Setaregan Abipoosh.)	3–1	2–0	0–0	—	3–2	0–0
Malavan Mokran Sirjan	1–2	5–1	2–1	3–0 (Note: Ettehad Ghale Raeisi did not appear at the field.)	1–2	0–1	0–0	1–1	0–3	0–2	—	2–1
Mes Novin Kerman	0–0	0–2	2–0	2–1	1–0	1–1	1–0	1–0	0–0	0–2	0–0	—

Updated to match(es) played on 20 July 2024. Source:
Legend: Blue = home team win; Yellow = draw; Red = away team win.

== Play-offs ==
=== Qualified teams ===
2nd placed teams in Second Stage (3 teams):

- Sepahan Novin Isfahan
- Golchin Robat Karim
- Iranjavan Bushehr

Best 3rd placed team in Second Stage (1 team):

- Mehr Khalij Tehran

=== First round ===
Team 1	Score	Team 2	1st leg	2nd leg	Notes
Mehr Khalij Tehran	2-1	Golchin Robat Karim	1-1	1-0	
Iranjavan Bushehr	2-5	Sepahan Novin Isfahan	1-3	1-2	

29 July 2023
18:00

Mehr Khalij Tehran	1-1	Golchin Robat Karim

Shabahang, Shahriar
3 August 2023
18:00

Golchin Robat Karim	0-1	Mehr Khalij Tehran

Shohada, Robat Karim

Mehr Khalij Tehran won 2-1 and promoted to second play-off round.

29 July 2023
19:00

Iranjavan Bushehr	1-3	Sepahan Novin Isfahan

3 July 2023
19:00

Sepahan Novin Isfahan	2-1	Iranjavan Bushehr

Fooladshahr, Isfahan

Sepahan Novin Isfahan won 5-2 and promoted to second play-off round.

=== Second round ===
Team 1	Score	Team 2	1st leg	2nd leg	Notes
Sepahan Novin Isfahan	1-1	Mehr Khalij Tehran	1-0	0-1	

8 September 2023
16:15

Sepahan Novin Isfahan	1-0	Mehr Khalij Tehran

Qods Kargaran, Isfahan
14 September 2023
17:00

Mehr Khalij Tehran	1-0 (a.e.t.)	Sepahan Novin Isfahan
Penalties
	8-9

Shabahang, Shahriar

Sepahan Novin Isfahan won 9–8 on penalties and promoted to 2024-25 Iran Football's 2nd Division.

== See also ==
- 2023–24 Persian Gulf Pro League
- 2023–24 Azadegan League
- 2023–24 2nd Division
- 2023–24 Hazfi Cup
- 2023 Iranian Super Cup
