= KIA Football Academy =

KIA Academy
- Full name: KIA Football Academy
- Founded: 2015; 11 years ago
- Ground: Be’sat Stadium; Tehran, Iran
- Coordinates: 35.6469382°N 51.452926°W
- Owner: Mehdi Mahdavikia
- Coach: Hadi Mahdavikia
- League: League 2 (Iran)
- 2024–25: League 2, 7th (Group One)
First colours	Second colours

The KIA Football Club (Persian: باشگاه فوتبال کیا), commonly known as KIA FC, is an Iranian youth football academy that was established by Mehdi Mahdavikia in 2015 in southeastern Tehran.

German magazine 11 Freunde has described it as "the best football academy" in Iran, and unique in terms of being dedicated to "sustainable, conceptual youth work". The club follows the TSG 1899 Hoffenheim-model, i.e. starting at grassroots-level before developing into a team that can enter the professional leagues. Each year, the club scouts more than a thousand players from all across the country and after trials, only retains top 25 talents.

KIA has shown remarkable results since its foundation and frequently travels to Europe in order to play against renowned opponents.

== Season-by-season ==
Season	Div.	Pos.	Hazfi Cup
2020–21	3rd Division	8th	
2021–22	3rd Division	2th	
2022–23	3rd Division	6th	
2023–24	2nd Division	12th	Round of 32
2024–25	2nd Division		Second round

== Current squads ==
As of 20 February 2026

=== First Team ===
Note: Flags indicate national team as defined under FIFA eligibility rules; some limited exceptions apply. Players may hold more than one non-FIFA nationality.

No.	Pos.	Nation	Player
2	DF	IRN	Mehdi Ramezanpour
3	DF	IRN	Mojtaba Mohammadi
4	DF	IRN	Amirreza Firouzbakht
5	DF	IRN	Peyman Keshavarzi (captain)
6	DF	IRN	Amirhossein Ghasemi
7	FW	IRN	Mohammadhossein Faraji
8	MF	IRN	Meysam Rezaeikia
9	FW	IRN	Arshia Hatami
10	FW	IRN	Erfan Ghorbani
11	FW	IRN	Seyed Mohammadreza Rezaei
12	GK	IRN	Alireza Rostamijo
13	MF	IRN	Yasin Shokouhipour
14	FW	IRN	Amirreza Shokri
16	FW	IRN	Mohammadamin Shamsipour
19	FW	IRN	Ario Mahdavikia
21	MF	IRN	Milad Shabahang

No.	Pos.	Nation	Player
23	DF	IRN	Sina Ghasemi
30	MF	IRN	Farshad Hashemi
33	MF	IRN	Mostafa Sheykh
40	GK	IRN	Babak Salamat
44	DF	IRN	Parsa Khooshannia
45	FW	IRN	Shervin Jafari
49	MF	IRN	Soroush Ghanipour
55	DF	IRN	Hadi Rafsanjani
66	FW	IRN	Hesam Hendi
77	FW	IRN	Armin Hassani
80	FW	IRN	Elyar Rahmani
84	FW	IRN	Mohammad Irannejad
87	FW	IRN	Alireza Sharifi
88	DF	IRN	Sina Ameri
91	DF	IRN	Mohammadali Parsi

== Current staff ==
Current Managers
Manager	Hadi Mahdavikia
Goalkeeping Coach	Hesam Zeytooninejad
Fitness coach	Akbar Bakhtiari
Owner	Mehdi Mahdavikia

== Honours ==
=== Domestic league competitions ===
League		Title(s)	Season(s)
U14	National Premier League	Winners (1)	2018–2019
U14	Tehran Premier League	Winners (2)	2016–2017, 2017–2018
U16	Tehran 1st Division League	Winners (1)	2016–2017

=== International ===
Cup		Title(s)	Year(s)
Norway Cup	U13	Runners-up (2)	2015, 2016
Norway Cup	U11	Winners (1)	2015
(Austria) Cordial Cup	U13	Winners (2)	2018, 2019
(Austria) Cordial Cup	U11	Runners-up (1)	2015
(Germany) Deutsches Fußball Internat	U12	Runners-up (1)	2016
(Belgium) Bassevelde Cup	U13	Winners (1)	2019
