= Shariat Novin Mashhad F.C. =

Iranian football club

- Short name: Shariat
- Founded: 2016
- Owner: Seyedeh Saeideh Shariat
- Chairman: Seyed Saeid Shariat
- Head Coach: Mohammad Atiturk
- League: 3rd Division
- 2023–24: First Round 5th
- Website: https://shariatnovin.com
Home colours	Away colours	Third colours

Shariat Novin Mashhad Football Club (Persian: باشگاه فوتبال شریعت نوین مشهد) is an Iranian association football club based in Mashhad.
