= 2017–18 Azadegan League =

Azadegan League
- Season: 2017–18
- Champions: Naft Masjed Soleyman; 1st Azadegan League title
- Promoted: Naft Masjed Soleyman; Nassaji Mazandaran
- Relegated: Iranjavan; Saba Qom; Rah Ahan
- Matches played: 306
- Goals scored: 673 (2.2 per match)
- Top goalscorer: Farshid Padash; Shahin Majidi (17 goals)
- Biggest home win: Oxin Alborz 8–0 Saba Qom (29 March 2018)
- Biggest away win: Rah Ahan 1–7 Fajr Sepasi (11 March 2018); Rah Ahan 0–6 Nassaji Mazandaran (29 April 2018)
- Highest scoring: Rah Ahan 1–7 Fajr Sepasi (11 March 2018); Oxin Alborz 8–0 Saba Qom (29 March 2018)
- Longest winning run: 4 matches Baadraan; Naft MIS
- Longest unbeaten run: 19 matches Malavan
- Longest winless run: 25 matches Saba Qom
- Longest losing run: 10 matches Saba Qom
- Highest attendance: 23,000; Rah Ahan – Nassaji (29 April 2018)
- Lowest attendance: 0 (spectator ban); Mes Kerman – Rah Ahan (21 January 2018)
- Total attendance: 697,444
- Average attendance: 2,287

The 2017–18 Azadegan League was the 27th season of the Azadegan League and 17th as the second highest division since its establishment in 1991. The season featured 13 teams from the 2016–17 Azadegan League, two new teams relegated from the 2016–17 Persian Gulf Pro League: Saba Qom and Machine Sazi and three new teams promoted from the 2016–17 League 2: Shahrdari Tabriz and Shahrdari Mahshahr both as champions and Bargh Jadid Shiraz. The league started on 7 August 2017 and ended on 29 April 2018. Naft Masjed Soleyman won the Azadegan League title for the first time in their history. Naft Masjed Soleyman and Nassaji Mazandaran promoted to the Persian Gulf Pro League. Farshid Padash and Shahin Majidi were the top scorers, with 17 goals each.

== Teams ==
=== Stadia and locations ===
Locations of clubs

Team	Location	Stadium	Capacity
Aluminium Arak	Arak	Imam Khomeini	15,000
Baadraan Tehran	Tehran	Kargaran	5,000
Bargh Jadid Shiraz	Shiraz	Hafezieh	15,000
Fajr Sepasi	Shiraz	Hafezieh	15,000
Gol Gohar	Sirjan	Gol Gohar Sport Complex	3,200
Iranjavan	Bushehr	Shahid Beheshti	15,000
Khooneh be Khooneh	Babol	Haft-e Tir	6,000
Malavan	Bandar-e Anzali	Takhti Anzali	8,000
Machine Sazi	Tabriz	Bonyan Diesel	12,000
Mes Kerman	Kerman	Shahid Bahonar	15,430
Mes Rafsanjan	Rafsanjan	Shohadaye Noushabad	5,000
Naft Masjed Soleyman	Masjed Soleyman	Behnam Mohammadi	8,000
Nassaji Mazandaran	Qaem Shahr	Vatani	15,000
Oxin Alborz	Karaj	Enghelab	15,000
Rah Ahan	Tehran	Ekbatan	12,000
Saba Qom	Qom	Yadegar-e Emam Qom	10,610
Shahrdari Mahshahr	Bandar-e Mahshahr	Shohada Mahshahr	3,000
Shahrdari Tabriz	Tabriz	Sahand	66,833

== League table ==
Pos	Team	Pld	W	D	L	GF	GA	GD	Pts	Promotion or relegation
1	Naft Masjed Soleyman (C, P)	34	18	11	5	46	25	+21	65	Promotion to 2018-19 Persian Gulf Pro League
2	Nassaji Mazandaran (P)	34	19	7	8	49	26	+23	64	Promotion to 2018-19 Persian Gulf Pro League
3	Khooneh be Khooneh	34	17	13	4	39	17	+22	64	
4	Fajr Sepasi	34	18	7	9	48	25	+23	61	
5	Baadraan Tehran	34	15	14	5	54	32	+22	59	
6	Malavan	34	13	16	5	39	26	+13	55	
7	Gol Gohar	34	13	13	8	47	35	+12	52	
8	Mes Kerman	34	15	7	12	37	33	+4	52	
9	Oxin Alborz	34	13	12	9	40	27	+13	51	
10	Mes Rafsanjan	34	11	15	8	38	29	+9	48	
11	Sh. Mahshahr	34	11	8	15	41	42	−1	41	
12	Bargh Jadid Shiraz	34	10	11	13	30	34	−4	41	
13	Aluminium Arak	34	8	15	11	29	34	−5	39	
14	Sh. Tabriz	34	10	8	16	36	45	−9	38	
15	Machine Sazi	34	8	13	13	27	32	−5	37	
16	Iranjavan (R)	34	8	9	17	33	49	−16	33	Relegation to 2018–19 2nd Division
17	Saba Qom (R)	34	1	9	24	24	90	−66	12	Relegation to 2018–19 2nd Division
18	Rah Ahan (R)	34	2	4	28	15	71	−56	10	Relegation to 2018–19 2nd Division

Updated to match(es) played on 29 April 2018. Source: lig1.ir
Rules for classification: 1) points; 2) goal difference; 3) number of goals scored.
(C) Champions; (P) Promoted; (R) Relegated

== Results ==
Home \ Away	ALU	BAD	BJS	FJR	GOL	IRJ	KBK	MST	MLV	MES	MSR	NFT	NSJ	OXI	RAH	SAB	SHM	SHT
Aluminium Arak		0–0	1–0	0–0	0–1	1–2	0–1	2–2	0–0	0–2	0–0	1–1	0–2	0–2	4–0	0–0	2–1	0–0
Baadraan Tehran	3–1		3–1	0–0	1–1	3–1	0–0	2–0	1–1	1–0	1–0	1–0	1–0	2–2	1–0	7–0	1–2	1–1
Bargh Jadid Shiraz	0–1	2–0		1–1	4–0	1–1	2–2	1–0	0–0	0–1	1–1	0–0	0–1	1–0	1–0	2–1	3–4	1–0
Fajr Sepasi	3–0	0–1	2–0		1–2	1–0	1–1	3–0	2–1	0–1	1–0	1–0	0–0	2–0	1–0	6–1	2–1	3–1
Gol Gohar	1–1	0–0	1–2	1–1		1–2	0–0	2–1	0–0	5–1	0–0	2–1	3–1	1–1	1–0	5–1	3–2	5–2
Iranjavan	2–2	0–3	1–1	0–1	0–1		0–2	0–2	1–1	2–0	2–1	0–1	0–1	1–1	3–2	0–0	1–0	2–1
Khooneh be Khooneh	0–0	1–0	2–1	1–2	0–0	3–1		0–0	0–0	2–1	1–1	1–0	2–1	1–0	1–0	4–0	3–0	1–0
Machine Sazi	1–2	2–1	0–1	3–0	0–0	1–1	0–0		1–2	0–1	1–1	0–0	1–0	2–2	1–0	0–0	2–1	1–2
Malavan	1–0	1–1	1–0	2–1	1–1	0–0	1–0	2–0		3–2	1–2	1–1	3–0	1–0	1–0	2–2	2–1	3–0
Mes Kerman	0–0	0–0	0–0	0–1	3–1	2–1	2–2	1–0	1–1		2–1	1–2	1–2	1–0	2–1	3–1	1–0	0–2
Mes Rafsanjan	2–2	2–3	1–2	2–1	1–0	2–1	1–0	0–0	0–0	1–0		1–1	0–0	0–0	1–0	7–0	1–0	0–0
Naft Masjed Soleyman	2–2	3–3	3–0	1–0	2–0	3–0	0–1	3–0	2–2	2–1	2–2		0–0	1–0	2–1	2–1	1–1	2–1
Nassaji Mazandaran	1–0	4–1	1–1	2–0	0–1	1–0	1–0	1–0	2–1	1–0	3–1	0–1		2–2	2–1	1–0	1–0	2–0
Oxin Alborz	2–0	2–2	1–0	1–0	2–2	3–2	0–0	0–0	1–0	1–1	1–1	0–1	1–0		2–0	8–0	1–0	1–0
Rah Ahan	1–2	0–4	0–0	1–7	0–4	1–1	0–3	0–0	1–1	0–3	1–0	0–1	0–6	1–2		0–1	0–4	1–2
Saba Qom	1–4	2–3	1–1	0–1	2–2	3–4	1–2	0–4	1–1	0–2	0–2	0–1	1–6	0–1	0–1		1–1	1–1
Sh. Mahshahr	1–0	1–1	1–0	0–0	1–0	0–1	1–2	1–1	2–1	0–0	1–1	1–3	2–2	1–0	3–1	3–1		4–2
Sh. Tabriz	0–0	2–2	2–0	1–3	1–0	2–1	0–0	0–1	0–1	0–1	1–2	0–1	2–2	1–0	4–1	3–1	2–1	

Updated to match(es) played on 29 April 2018. Source: lig1.ir
Legend: Blue = home team win; Yellow = draw; Red = away team win.

== Clubs season-progress ==
Team ╲ Round	1	2	3	4	5	6	7	8	9	10	11	12	13	14	15	16	17	18	19	20	21	22	23	24	25	26	27	28	29	30	31	32	33	34
Naft Masjed Soleyman	W	W	W	W	D	L	W	D	W	W	W	W	D	W	W	D	D	D	W	W	L	D	L	W	D	W	L	D	W	W	W	D	L	D
Nassaji Mazandaran	W	L	W	W	D	W	L	W	W	D	W	L	W	L	L	D	W	W	L	W	L	W	L	D	D	W	W	D	W	W	W	D	W	W
Khooneh be Khooneh	D	D	W	L	L	W	W	D	D	W	D	W	D	D	W	W	D	L	W	W	W	D	W	W	W	D	D	D	W	W	L	W	D	W
Fajr Sepasi	L	L	W	L	W	W	D	L	D	W	D	W	L	W	W	D	W	D	W	L	W	D	W	W	D	W	W	W	L	W	W	L	L	W
Baadraan Tehran	W	W	D	W	D	W	D	D	L	L	D	W	W	W	W	D	W	D	W	D	D	D	W	D	L	W	D	D	L	W	D	W	W	L
Malavan	W	L	D	D	W	L	L	D	W	D	W	L	D	D	D	W	W	D	W	D	D	D	W	D	D	D	D	W	W	D	W	W	L	W
Gol Gohar	D	W	W	L	D	D	D	W	L	L	D	W	D	W	L	L	L	D	W	D	W	L	W	D	D	W	W	D	D	D	W	W	L	W
Mes Kerman	W	D	W	W	L	D	D	W	L	L	W	L	W	L	L	W	W	L	L	W	L	D	W	W	D	L	W	W	L	W	D	W	D	L
Oxin Alborz	D	W	L	W	L	W	W	L	D	D	D	W	W	L	W	L	W	D	L	W	W	W	L	D	D	D	D	D	W	L	L	L	D	W
Mes Rafsanjan	D	D	L	W	D	D	W	W	D	W	L	L	L	W	D	L	D	W	D	W	D	W	W	D	L	D	L	D	D	L	W	D	W	D
Sh. Mahshahr	W	W	W	L	D	L	D	D	D	W	L	L	L	L	L	L	W	W	L	W	D	L	W	L	W	L	D	D	D	L	W	L	W	L
Bargh Jadid Shiraz	L	W	L	W	W	D	W	W	W	D	D	W	D	L	L	W	D	D	D	L	L	L	L	D	W	L	L	L	D	L	D	L	W	L
Aluminium Arak	D	D	L	L	D	W	D	D	L	L	D	L	W	W	W	L	L	W	D	L	D	D	D	L	W	D	D	D	D	W	L	W	D	L
Sh. Tabriz	L	L	W	L	D	D	L	L	L	D	D	L	D	L	W	W	L	W	W	L	W	D	L	W	D	L	W	D	W	L	L	L	W	L
Machine Sazi	L	W	L	D	D	L	W	L	D	D	L	W	L	W	D	D	L	D	L	D	W	W	D	L	L	D	D	L	D	L	L	D	W	W
Iranjavan	L	L	L	D	D	L	L	D	W	D	D	W	W	D	L	W	L	L	L	L	L	W	L	L	L	L	D	W	L	W	D	D	L	W
Saba Qom	D	L	L	D	D	D	L	D	W	D	L	L	L	L	L	D	L	L	L	L	D	L	L	D	L	L	L	L	L	L	L	L	L	L
Rah Ahan	L	L	L	L	D	L	L	L	L	L	D	L	L	L	D	L	L	L	D	L	L	L	L	L	W	W	L	L	L	L	L	L	L	L

Source: lig1.ir
W = Win; D = Draw; L = Lose

== Statistics ==
=== Top scorers ===
Position	Player	Club	Goals
1	(Iran) Farshid Padash	Shahrdari Mahshahr	14
2	(Iran) Shahin Majidi	Fajr Sepasi	12
2	(Iran) Shahin Shafiei	Oxin Alborz	12
4	(Iran) Oveis Kordjahan	Iranjavan	11
5	(Iran) Rouhollah Bagheri	Khooneh be Khooneh	10

Notes:
Updated to games played on 29 March 2018. Source: dsport.ir

== Attendances ==
=== Average home attendances ===
Pos	Team	Total	High	Low	Average	Change
1	Nassaji	220,000	15,000	8,000	12,941	+25.2%
2	Naft MIS	95,000	10,000	3,000	5,588	+183.8%
3	Khooneh be Khooneh	77,000	6,000	3,000	4,529	+9.8%
4	Fajr Sepasi	54,000	5,000	1,500	3,176	+65.6%
5	Sh. Mahshahr	42,400	3,000	900	2,494	n/a
6	Malavan	38,677	4,000	1,000	2,275	−37.5%
7	Iranjavan	30,700	3,000	200	1,806	−5.8%
8	Bargh Jadid Shiraz	28,727	6,000	150	1,690	n/a
9	Rah Ahan	25,750	23,000	50	1,515	+705.9%
10	Mes Kerman	23,700	5,000	0	1,481	−25.1%
11	Gol Gohar	15,400	2,000	100	906	−61.0%
12	Aluminium Arak	12,400	2,000	100	729	−65.1%
13	Baadraan Tehran	6,545	2,000	100	385	−27.6%
14	Oxin Alborz	6,350	1,000	50	374	−36.4%
15	Sh. Tabriz	5,640	1,000	100	332	n/a
16	Mes Rafsanjan	5,565	2,000	50	327	−51.6%
17	Saba Qom	5,240	1,500	50	308	−85.9%
18	Machine Sazi	4,200	500	150	247	−82.3%
	League total	697,444	23,000	0	2,287	−13.7%

Updated to games played on 29 April 2018
Source: lig1.ir
Notes:
Matches with spectator bans are not included in average attendances
Machine Sazi and Saba Qom played last season in Persian Gulf Pro League
Bargh Jadid Shiraz, Shahrdari Mahshahr and Shahrdari Tabriz played last season in League 2

=== Attendances by round ===
Team/Round	1	2	3	4	5	6	7	8	9	10	11	12	13	14	15	16	17	18	19	20	21	22	23	24	25	26	27	28	29	30	31	32	33	34	Average
Aluminium Arak	2,000	A	1,000	A	500	A	500	A	A	500	A	1,000	A	1,000	A	1,000	A	A	500	A	1,000	A	500	A	1,000	500	A	100	A	1,000	A	200	A	100	729
Baadraan Tehran	A	200	A	150	A	175	A	500	A	500	A	2,000	A	120	A	A	300	200	A	500	A	100	A	150	A	200	A	150	A	100	A	200	1,000	A	385
Bargh Jadid Shiraz	A	1,500	A	327	500	A	400	A	1,500	A	5,000	A	6,000	A	4,000	A	3,000	1,500	A	3,000	A	A	700	A	300	A	500	A	150	A	200	A	150	A	1,690
Fajr Sepasi	4,000	A	2,000	A	A	1,500	A	2,000	A	1,500	A	2,000	A	2,000	A	3,000	A	A	2,500	A	4,000	5,000	A	3,500	A	4,000	A	5,000	A	5,000	A	5,000	A	2,000	3,176
Gol Gohar	2,000	A	2,000	A	500	A	2,000	A	1,000	A	500	A	A	1,000	A	1,500	A	A	200	A	100	A	1,000	A	1,500	A	1,000	A	200	200	A	500	A	200	906
Iranjavan	2,000	A	2,000	A	2,000	A	A	2,000	A	3,000	A	2,000	A	1,500	A	1,500	A	A	1,500	A	2,000	A	2,000	1,500	A	2,000	A	1,000	A	1,500	A	3,000	A	200	1,806
Khooneh be Khooneh	3,000	A	5,000	A	4,000	A	3,000	A	3,000	A	A	3,500	A	3,000	A	4,000	A	A	3,500	A	6,000	A	5,000	A	6,000	A	5,000	5,000	A	6,000	A	6,000	A	6,000	4,529
Machine Sazi	A	300	A	150	A	200	A	150	A	200	A	200	A	300	A	250	A	300	A	150	A	300	A	500	A	250	A	500	A	150	A	150	A	150	247
Malavan	3,000	A	3,000	A	3,500	A	1,637	A	3,500	A	1,190	A	3,000	A	A	4,000	A	A	1,000	A	1,500	A	1,350	A	2,000	A	1,500	A	1,500	A	4,000	2,000	A	1,000	2,275
Mes Kerman	A	1,500	A	3,000	A	1,500	A	1,000	5,000	A	1,000	A	1,500	A	1,500	A	1,500	1,000	A	NC	A	1,000	A	500	A	A	1,000	A	1,000	A	1,500	A	200	A	1,481
Mes Rafsanjan	A	200	A	200	A	215	A	200	A	2,000	A	500	300	A	200	A	150	500	A	250	A	150	A	300	A	100	A	150	A	A	100	A	50	A	327
Naft Masjed Soleyman	6,000	A	A	5,000	A	3,000	A	5,000	A	5,000	A	6,000	A	5,000	A	8,000	A	A	5,000	4,000	A	5,000	A	3,000	A	5,000	A	6,000	A	6,000	A	8,000	A	10,000	5,588
Nassaji Mazandaran	A	12,000	A	15,000	A	15,000	A	12,000	A	15,000	10,000	A	12,000	A	15,000	A	10,000	8,000	A	15,000	A	13,500	A	10,000	A	12,500	A	A	15,000	A	15,000	A	15,000	A	12,941
Oxin Alborz	A	1,000	A	200	A	200	1,000	A	500	A	500	A	300	A	200	A	300	300	A	150	A	50	A	A	150	A	150	A	150	A	300	A	1,000	A	374
Rah Ahan	100	A	100	A	150	A	150	A	200	A	150	A	200	A	500	150	A	A	100	A	50	A	300	A	100	A	150	A	300	A	50	A	A	23,000	1,515
Saba Qom	A	1,000	A	150	A	300	A	150	A	200	A	120	A	120	300	A	150	100	A	50	A	1,500	A	200	A	200	A	150	A	500	A	A	50	A	308
Shahrdari Mahshahr	A	900	3,000	A	3,000	A	3,000	A	2,000	A	3,000	A	1,500	A	3,000	A	2,500	2,000	A	A	3,000	A	3,000	A	3,000	A	3,000	A	2,000	A	1,500	A	3,000	A	2,494
Shahrdari Tabriz	500	A	300	A	340	A	300	A	300	A	200	A	150	A	150	A	100	A	100	A	300	A	500	A	1,000	A	500	A	300	A	300	A	300	A	332
Total	22,600	18,600	18,400	24,177	14,400	22,090	11,987	23,000	17,000	27,900	21,540	17,320	24,950	14,040	24,850	23,400	18,000	13,900	14,400	23,100	17,950	26,600	14,350	19,650	15,050	24,750	12,800	18,050	20,600	20,450	22,950	25,050	20,750	42,650	697,444
Average	2,511	2,067	2,044	2,686	1,600	2,454	1,498	2,556	1,889	3,100	2,393	1,924	2,772	1,560	2,761	2,600	2,000	1,544	1,600	2,888	1,994	2,956	1,594	2,183	1,672	2,750	1,422	2,006	2,272	2,272	2,550	2,783	2,306	4,739	2,287

Notes:
Updated to games played on 29 April 2018. Source: lig1.ir
Matches with spectator bans are not included in average attendances
Baadraan Tehran played their match against Shahrdari Tabriz at Shohada Shahr-e Qods
Bargh Jadid Shiraz played their matches against Gol Gohar, Iranjavan, Khooneh be Khooneh, Machine Sazi, Malavan, Mes Kerman, Mes Rafsanjan, Nassaji and Shahrdari Mahshahr at Shahid Dastgheib
Fajr Sepasi played their matches against Aluminium Arak, Bargh Jadid Shiraz, Khooneh be Khooneh, Machine Sazi, Mes Kerman, Naft MIS, Nassaji, Oxin Alborz, Shahrdari Mahshahr and Shahrdari Tabriz at Shahid Dastgheib
Gol Gohar played their matches against Aluminium Arak, Fajr Sepasi, Khooneh be Khooneh, Malavan, Naft MIS, Saba Qom and Shahrdari Mahshahr at Imam Ali
Gol Gohar played their matches against Mes Kerman, Nassaji and Shahrdari Tabriz at Bandar Abbas
Machine Sazi played their match against Fajr Sepasi at Sahand
Rah Ahan played their match against Khooneh be Khooneh at Kargaran
Rah Ahan played their match against Nassaji at Takhti Tehran
Saba Qom played their matches against Bargh Jadid Shiraz, Iranjavan, Mes Kerman, Nassaji and Rah Ahan at Shahid Heydariyan
Mes Kerman played their match against Rah Ahan at Sirjan
Shahrdari Tabriz played their matches against Bargh Jadid Shiraz, Fajr Sepasi, Iranjavan, Malavan, Mes Rafsanjan, Nassaji and Shahrdari Mahshahr at Shahid Tavana sports complex

=== Highest attendances ===
Rank	Home team	Score	Away team	Attendance	Date	Week	Stadium
1	Rah Ahan	0–6	Nassaji	23,000	29 April 2018	34	Takhti Tehran
2	Nassaji	1–0	Khooneh be Khooneh	15,000	2 September 2017	4	Vatani
2	Nassaji	2–1	Malavan	15,000	24 September 2017	6	Vatani
2	Nassaji	1–1	Bargh Jadid Shiraz	15,000	26 October 2017	10	Vatani
2	Nassaji	0–1	Naft MIS	15,000	27 November 2017	15	Vatani
2	Nassaji	1–0	Aluminium Arak	15,000	21 January 2018	20	Vatani
2	Nassaji	4–1	Baadraan Tehran	15,000	29 March 2018	29	Vatani
2	Nassaji	1–0	Machine Sazi	15,000	10 April 2018	31	Vatani
2	Nassaji	2–0	Fajr Sepasi	15,000	23 April 2018	33	Vatani
10	Nassaji	1–0	Shahrdari Mahshahr	13,500	3 February 2018	22	Vatani

Notes:
Updated to games played on 29 April 2018. Source: lig1.ir

== See also ==
- 2017–18 Persian Gulf Pro League
- 2017–18 League 2
- 2017–18 League 3
- 2017–18 Hazfi Cup
- 2017 Iranian Super Cup
