= 2018–19 League 2 (Iran) =

Iran Football's 2nd Division
- Season: 2018–19

The 2018–19 Iran Football's 2nd Division season was the 18th under 2nd Division since its establishment (current format) in 2001. The season featured 21 teams from the 2nd Division 2017–18, three new teams relegated from the 2017–18 Azadegan League: Saba Qom, Rah Ahan Tehran and Iranjavan Boushehr, and four new teams promoted from the 3rd Division 2017–18: Chooka Talesh, Shahrdari Kamyaran, Esteghlal Ramshir, Jahad Nasr Sirjan.

== Teams ==
=== Stadia and locations ===
Locations of clubs in 2016–17 Iran Football's 2nd Division

== League table ==
=== Group A ===
Pos	Team	Pld	W	D	L	GF	GA	GD	Pts	Promotion or relegation
1	Khooshe Talaye Sana Saveh (P)	24	16	6	2	27	12	+15	54	2019–20 Azadegan League
2	Damash (A)	24	14	5	5	34	14	+20	47	Playoff round
3	Foolad B	24	14	3	7	29	14	+15	45	
4	Moghavemat	24	11	9	4	42	29	+13	42	
5	Shahrdari Bam	24	10	5	9	30	27	+3	35	
6	Shahrdari Kamyaran	24	10	4	10	30	33	−3	34	
7	Chooka Talesh	24	10	4	10	24	28	−4	34	
8	Sardar Bukan	24	7	8	9	29	30	−1	29	
9	Caspian Qazvin	24	7	5	12	22	24	−2	26	
10	Sh. Hamedan	24	6	6	12	19	28	−9	24	
11	Esteghlal Ahvaz (R)	24	6	5	13	23	47	−24	23	Relegation to 2019–20 3rd Division 2nd Stage
12	Mes Novin Kerman	24	5	6	13	24	36	−12	21	
13	Iranjavan Bushehr	24	4	6	14	20	31	−11	18	
14	Rah Ahan (R)	0	0	0	0	0	0	0	0	Relegation to 2019–20 3rd Division 1st Stage

Updated to match(es) played on 22 April 2019. Source:
Rules for classification: 1) points; 2) goal difference; 3) number of goals scored.
(P) Promoted; (R) Relegated

=== Group B ===
Pos	Team	Pld	W	D	L	GF	GA	GD	Pts	Promotion or relegation
1	Arman Gahar Sirjan (P)	24	13	5	6	33	25	+8	44	2019–20 Azadegan League
2	Niroo Zamini (P)	24	12	7	5	40	22	+18	43	Playoff round
3	Pas Hamedan	24	10	11	3	32	18	+14	41	
4	Naft va Gaz Gachsaran	24	11	8	5	30	19	+11	41	
5	Sh. Bandar Abbas	24	8	8	8	24	22	+2	32	
6	Esteghlal Ramshir	24	7	10	7	26	19	+7	31	
7	Sh. Fuman	24	9	3	12	31	41	−10	30	
8	Kheibar Khoramabad	24	7	8	9	29	36	−7	29	
9	Naft Omidiyeh	24	7	7	10	26	32	−6	28	
10	Be'sat Kermanshah	24	7	6	11	22	34	−12	27	
11	Perspolis Ganaveh	24	7	5	12	21	28	−7	26	
12	Shohadaye Babolsar	24	7	5	12	29	45	−16	26	
13	Mes Shahr Babak (R)	24	5	9	10	29	31	−2	24	Relegation to 2019–20 3rd Division 2nd Stage
14	Saba Qom (R)	0	0	0	0	0	0	0	0	Relegation to 2019–20 3rd Division 1st Stage

Updated to match(es) played on 22 April 2019. Source:
Rules for classification: 1) points; 2) goal difference; 3) number of goals scored.
(P) Promoted; (R) Relegated

== 2nd Division Play-off ==
Team 1	Agg.	Team 2	1st leg	2nd leg
Niroo Zamini	2-1	Damash	0-0	2-1

=== Leg 1 ===
28 April 2019
17:30

Niroo Zamini	0-0	Damash

Ghadir Tehran
Referee: Seyed Mehdi Seyed Ali

=== Leg 2 ===
5 May 2019
17:00

Damash	1-2	Niroo Zamini
Mohammad Rostami (P) 5'		Aref Rostami 55', Amir Hosein Gholami 86'

Sardar Jangal Rasht
Referee: Seyed Vahid Kazemi

source=

== 2nd Division Final ==
Team 1	Score	Team 2
Khooshe Talaye Sana Saveh	1-0	Arman Gahar Sirjan

=== Leg 1 ===
2 May 2019
16:00

Khooshe Talaye Sana Saveh	1-0	Arman Gahar Sirjan
Mohsen Rahimi 34'

Chamran Saveh
Referee: Ali Sam
