= 2017–18 League 2 (Iran) =

Iran Football's 2nd Division
- Season: 2017–18
- Promoted: Arvand Khorramshahr; Shahin Bushehr; Esteghlal Jonoub Tehran

The 2017–18 Iran Football's 2nd Division season is the 17th under 2nd Division since its establishment (current format) in 2001. The season featured 25 teams from the 2nd Division 2016–17, three new teams relegated from the 2016–17 Azadegan League: Kheibar Khoramabad, Foolad Yazd, Esteghlal Ahvaz, and five new teams promoted from the 3rd Division 2016–17: Shahrdari Bam, Mes Novin Kerman, Perspolis Mashhad, Khoushe Talaye Sana, Shohadaye Babolsar.

== Teams ==
=== Stadia and locations ===
Locations of clubs in 2016–17 Iran Football's 2nd Division

== League table ==
=== Group A ===
Pos	Team	Pld	W	D	L	GF	GA	GD	Pts	Qualification or relegation
1	Arvand Khorramshahr	19	13	3	3	37	17	+20	42	Second round
2	Damash	19	9	9	1	18	7	+11	36	Second round
3	Shahin Bushehr	19	9	7	3	26	14	+12	34	Second round
4	Moghavemat Tehran	19	8	8	3	26	16	+10	32	Second round
5	Foolad B	19	8	5	6	32	14	+18	29	
6	Niroo Zamini	19	6	7	6	27	22	+5	25	
7	Qashqai Shiraz	19	5	7	7	16	17	−1	22	
8	Mes Novin Kerman	19	5	6	8	23	25	−2	21	
9	Gol Abrisham	19	4	6	9	18	30	−12	18	Relegation to 2018–19 3rd Division 2nd Stage
10	Shamooshak Mazandaran	19	3	2	14	14	45	−31	11	Relegation to 2018–19 3rd Division 2nd Stage
11	Termeh Dastjerdi	10	0	0	10	0	30	−30	0	Relegation to 2018–19 3rd Division 2nd Stage

Updated to match(es) played on 5 May 2017. Source:
Rules for classification: 1) points; 2) goal difference; 3) number of goals scored.

=== Group B ===
Pos	Team	Pld	W	D	L	GF	GA	GD	Pts	Qualification or relegation
1	Sh. Bandar Abbas	20	14	3	3	42	14	+28	45	Second round
2	Naft va Gaz Gachsaran	20	11	5	4	29	13	+16	38	Second round
3	Sardar Bukan	20	9	7	4	28	21	+7	34	Second round
4	Shahin Mahshahr	20	11	1	8	23	20	+3	34	Second round
5	Caspian Qazvin	20	8	4	8	23	19	+4	28	
6	Shohadaye Babolsar	20	6	7	7	19	27	−8	25	
7	Persepolis Mashhad	20	7	3	10	20	27	−7	24	
8	Esteghlal Ahvaz	20	8	5	7	23	23	0	29	
9	Sh. Kashan	20	4	7	9	19	33	−14	19	Relegation to 2018–19 3rd Division
10	Haf Semnan	20	4	6	10	15	27	−12	18	Relegation to 2018–19 3rd Division
11	Sh. Urmia	20	2	4	14	15	33	−18	10	Relegation to 2018–19 3rd Division

Updated to match(es) played on 18 March 2018. Source:
Rules for classification: 1) points; 2) goal difference; 3) number of goals scored.

=== Group C ===
Pos	Team	Pld	W	D	L	GF	GA	GD	Pts	Qualification or relegation
1	Sh. Fuman	20	12	3	5	35	17	+18	39	Second round
2	Naft Omidiyeh	20	9	5	6	30	22	+8	32	Second round
3	Khooshe Talaye Sana Saveh	20	8	7	5	19	19	0	31	Second round
4	Palayesh Abadan	20	8	6	6	25	14	+11	30	Second round
5	Sh. Hamedan	20	7	8	5	25	23	+2	29	
6	Kheibar Khoramabad	20	8	4	8	34	29	+5	28	
7	Be'sat Kermanshah	20	8	4	8	21	22	−1	28	
8	Shahrdari Bam	20	7	6	7	31	34	−3	27	
9	PAS Hamedan	20	7	5	8	27	22	+5	26	Relegation to 2018–19 3rd Division 2nd Stage
10	Sepehr Naghshe Jahan	20	4	7	9	16	29	−13	19	Relegation to 2018–19 3rd Division 2nd Stage
11	Kimiya Farayand	20	3	3	14	14	46	−32	12	Relegation to 2018–19 3rd Division 2nd Stage

Updated to match(es) played on 18 March 2018. Source: ^{1} Pas Hamedan was docked 6 points by FIFA.
Rules for classification: 1) points; 2) goal difference; 3) number of goals scored.

== Second round ==
=== Group A ===
Pos	Team	Pld	W	D	L	GF	GA	GD	Pts	Promotion or qualification
1	Arvand Khorramshahr	10	5	2	3	13	5	+8	17	Promotion to Azadegan League 2018–19
2	Esteghlal Jonoub	10	3	6	1	13	7	+6	15	2nd Division 2017–18 play-off
3	Khooshe Talaye	10	4	3	3	9	10	−1	15	
4	Naft Omidiyeh	10	3	4	3	9	13	−4	13	
5	Moghavemat	10	2	4	4	6	10	−4	10	
6	Gilanmehr Fouman	10	3	1	6	11	16	−5	10	

Updated to match(es) played on May 2017. Source:
Rules for classification: 1) points; 2) goal difference; 3) number of goals scored.

=== Group B ===
Pos	Team	Pld	W	D	L	GF	GA	GD	Pts	Promotion or qualification
1	Shahin Bushehr	10	6	4	0	23	7	+16	22	Promotion to Azadegan League 2018–19
2	Naft va Gaz Gachsaran	10	3	7	0	11	8	+3	16	2nd Division 2017–18 play-off
3	Damash	10	3	6	1	10	8	+2	15	
4	Shahrdari Bandar Abbas	10	3	2	5	13	21	−8	11	
5	Palayesh Abadan	10	2	2	6	13	21	−8	8	
6	Sardar Bukan	10	1	3	6	7	15	−8	6	

Updated to match(es) played on 9 June 2017. Source:
Rules for classification: 1) points; 2) goal difference; 3) number of goals scored.

== 2nd Division Play-off ==
Team 1	Agg.	Team 2	1st leg	2nd leg
Esteghlal Jonoub Tehran	1-1	Naft va Gaz Gachsaran	1-1	1-1

=== Leg 1 ===
May 2018

Naft va Gaz Gachsaran	1–1	Esteghlal Jonoub Tehran

Shohadaye Naft Gachsaran, Gachsaran

=== Leg 2 ===
May 24, 2018
21:45

Esteghlal Jonoub Tehran	1–1	Naft va Gaz Gachsaran
Penalties
	4–3

Dastgerdi, Tehran
