= Shahrdari Ardabil F.C. =

Iranian football club

Shahrdari Ardabil
- Full name: Shahrdari Ardabil Football Club
- Nickname: Artavil Ardabil
- Short name: Shahrdari
- Founded: 1991
- Ground: Ali Daei Stadium
- Capacity: 20,000
- Owner: Municipality of Ardabil
- League: Football's 3rd Division
- League 3, 7th
- Website: http://shahrdarifc.ir/

Shahrdari Ardabil Football Club is an Iranian football club based in Ardabil, Iran. In 2014, they were promoted to the Azadegan League for the first time in the club's history. They are the first team from Ardabil Province promoted to the Azadegan League. The team plays in Ali Daei Stadium and Ardabil's Takhti Stadium.

== Season-by-season ==
The table below shows the achievements of the club in various competitions.

Season	League	Position	Hazfi Cup	Notes
2010–11	League 2	7th/Group A	Did not qualify
2011–12	League 2	6th/Group A	Did not qualify
2012–13	League 2	6th/Group A	Did not qualify
2013–14	League 2	1st/Group A	Fourth Round	Promoted
2014–15	Azadegan League	6th/Group A	Round of 16
2015–16	Azadegan League	17th	Did not enter	Relegated
2016–17	League 2	11th/Group B	Withdrew	Relegated
2017–18	League 3	3rd/Group B	Did not qualify
2018–19	League 3	7th/Group A	Did not qualify
2019–20	League 3	9th/Group B	Did not qualify	Relegated

== See also ==
- 2014–15 Hazfi Cup
- 2014–15 Azadegan League
