= 2016–17 League 2 (Iran) =

Iran Football's 2nd Division
- Season: 2016–17
- Promoted: Sh. Tabriz; Sh. Mahshahr; Bargh Novin
- Relegated: Qashqai Shiraz; Sh. Arak; Shahbaz Nozhan; Shahre baran; Naft Novin; Abipoushan Ardabil; Baderan Novin; Aluminium Hormozgan; Kara Shiraz; Bani Gostar

The 2016–17 Iran Football's 2nd Division season is the 16th under 2nd Division since its establishment (current format) in 2001. The season featured 25 teams from the 2nd Division 2015–16, five new teams relegated from the 2015–16 Azadegan League: Aluminium Hormozgan, Damash, Giti Pasand, Shahrdari Ardabil, PAS Hamedan and six new teams promoted from the 3rd Division 2015–16: Shahrdari Fuman, Shahrdari Hamedan, Shahrdari Arak, Qashqai Shiraz, Shahin Mahshahr, Shahid Karimi Jooybar.

== Teams ==
=== Stadia and locations ===
Locations of clubs in 2016–17 Iran Football's 2nd Division

== League table ==
=== Group A ===
Pos	Team	Pld	W	D	L	GF	GA	GD	Pts	Qualification or relegation
1	Bargh Jadid Shiraz	24	12	10	2	28	7	+21	46	Second Round
2	Arvand Khorramshahr	24	12	9	3	31	16	+15	45	Second Round
3	Naft va Gaz Gachsaran	24	12	8	4	41	16	+25	44	Second Round
4	Naft Omidiyeh	24	11	9	4	33	20	+13	42	Second Round
5	Foolad B	24	11	8	5	40	23	+17	41	
6	Sepehr Naghshe Jahan	24	10	7	7	27	23	+4	37	
7	Kimia Farayand	24	9	9	6	37	25	+12	36	
8	Zagros Yasuj	24	9	9	6	37	25	+12	36	
9	Be'sat Kermanshah	24	10	4	10	34	35	−1	34	
10	Qashqai Shiraz	24	7	7	10	28	28	0	28	
11	Sh. Arak	24	6	7	11	26	34	−8	25	Relegation to 2017–18 3rd Division 2nd Stage
12	Shahbaz Nozhan	24	2	1	21	12	63	−51	7	Relegation to 2017–18 3rd Division 2nd Stage
13	Shahre baran Tehran	24	1	2	21	8	58	−50	5	Relegation to 2017–18 3rd Division 1st Stage

Updated to match(es) played on 5 May 2017. Source:
Rules for classification: 1) points; 2) goal difference; 3) number of goals scored.

=== Group B ===
Pos	Team	Pld	W	D	L	GF	GA	GD	Pts	Qualification or relegation
1	Sh. Kashan	22	11	7	4	31	16	+15	40	Second Round
2	Sh. Fuman	22	11	5	6	28	24	+4	38	Second Round
3	Sh. Mahshahr	22	10	5	7	34	24	+10	35	Second Round
4	Damash	22	10	4	8	28	19	+9	34	Second Round
5	Sh. Bandar Abbas	22	9	7	6	30	28	+2	34	
6	Esteghlal B Tehran	22	7	8	7	20	23	−3	29	
7	Petrokiyan Shoshtar	22	6	10	6	28	23	+5	28	
8	Sh. Urmia	22	7	6	9	24	30	−6	27	
9	Sh.Karimi Juybar	22	7	6	9	18	26	−8	27	
10	Sanat Naft Novin	22	6	5	11	21	34	−13	23	Relegation to 2017–18 3rd Division
11	Shahrdari Ardabil F.C.	22	5	7	10	25	28	−3	22	Relegation to 2017–18 3rd Division
12	Baderan Novin	22	4	8	10	18	30	−12	20	Relegation to 2017–18 3rd Division

Updated to match(es) played on 5 May 2017. Source:
Rules for classification: 1) points; 2) goal difference; 3) number of goals scored.

=== Group C ===
Pos	Team	Pld	W	D	L	GF	GA	GD	Pts	Qualification or relegation
1	Sh. Hamedan	22	12	6	4	34	17	+17	42	Second Round
2	Sh. Tabriz	22	10	6	6	32	22	+10	36	Second Round
3	Shahin Bushehr	22	8	10	4	26	19	+7	34	Second Round
4	Haf Semnan	22	8	8	6	28	24	+4	32	Second Round
5	Sardar Bukan	22	7	10	5	25	21	+4	31	
6	PAS Hamedan	22	9	8	5	26	16	+10	29	
7	Niroo Zamini	22	6	10	6	27	18	+9	28	
8	Shahin Mahshahr	22	7	6	9	27	29	−2	27	
9	Caspian Qazvin	22	5	10	7	17	18	−1	25	
10	Aluminium Hormozgan	22	6	7	9	15	27	−12	25	Relegation to 2017–18 3rd Division 2nd Stage
11	Kara Shiraz	22	5	6	11	17	33	−16	21	Relegation to 2017–18 3rd Division 2nd Stage
12	Bani Gostar	22	3	5	14	12	42	−30	14	Relegation to 2017–18 3rd Division 1st Stage

Updated to match(es) played on 5 May 2017. Source:
^{1} Pas Hamedan was docked 6 points by FIFA.
Rules for classification: 1) points; 2) goal difference; 3) number of goals scored.

== Second round ==
=== Group A ===
Pos	Team	Pld	W	D	L	GF	GA	GD	Pts	Promotion or qualification
1	Sh. Tabriz	10	5	3	2	14	10	+4	18	Promotion to Azadegan League 2017-18
2	Shahin Bushehr	10	3	5	2	9	8	+1	14	2nd Division 2015–16 play-off
3	Sh. Hamedan	10	4	2	4	7	8	−1	14	
4	Haf Semnan	10	4	1	5	11	11	0	13	
5	Arvand Khorramshahr	10	3	4	3	10	10	0	13	
6	Naft va Gaz Gachsaran	10	3	1	6	8	12	−4	10	

Updated to match(es) played on May 2017. Source:
Rules for classification: 1) points; 2) goal difference; 3) number of goals scored.

=== Group B ===
Pos	Team	Pld	W	D	L	GF	GA	GD	Pts	Promotion or qualification
1	Sh. Mahshahr	10	4	5	1	11	7	+4	17	Promotion to Azadegan League 2017-18
2	Bargh Jadid Shiraz	10	4	3	3	12	9	+3	15	2nd Division 2015–16 play-off
3	Sh. Kashan	10	3	5	2	14	10	+4	14	
4	Naft Omidiyeh	10	2	6	2	14	12	+2	12	
5	Damash	10	2	4	4	7	13	−6	10	
6	Sh. Fuman	10	1	5	4	5	12	−7	8	

Updated to match(es) played on 9 June 2017. Source:
Rules for classification: 1) points; 2) goal difference; 3) number of goals scored.

== 2nd Division Play-off ==
Team 1	Score	Team 2	Notes
Bargh Jadid Shiraz	1-0	Shahin Bushehr	Stadium: Yadegar-E-Emam Qom
