= 2015–16 Azadegan League =

25th season of Azadegan League

Azadegan League
- Season: 2015–16
- Champions: Paykan; 2nd Azadegan League title
- Promoted: Paykan; Machine Sazi; Sanat Naft
- Relegated: PAS Hamedan; Shahrdari Ardabil; Sanaye Giti Pasand; Damash; Aluminium Hormozgan
- Matches: 380
- Goals: 796 (2.09 per match)
- Top goalscorer: Hamid Kazemi (16 goals)
- Biggest home win: Parseh 5–0 Pas Hamedan (14 February 2016); Sanat Naft 5–0 Sh. Ardabil (3 May 2016)
- Biggest away win: Iranjavan 0–3 Kheybar (30 November 2015)
- Highest scoring: Foolad Yazd 3–5 Parseh (14 January 2016)
- Longest winning run: 6 matches Fajr Shiraz
- Longest unbeaten run: 13 matches Paykan; Naft MIS
- Longest winless run: 18 matches Aluminium Hormozgan
- Longest losing run: 9 matches Aluminium Hormozgan
- Highest attendance: 15,500; Machine Sazi – Mes Rafsanjan (10 May 2016)
- Lowest attendance: 0 (spectator ban); Naft MIS – Paykan (4 September 2015); Naft MIS – Mes Kerman (16 September 2015); Kheybar – Aluminium Arak (28 September 2015); Kheybar – Khooneh be Khooneh (12 October 2015); Nassaji – Damash (29 February 2016); Nassaji – Parseh Tehran (11 April 2016)
- Total attendance: 761,770
- Average attendance: 2,539

The 2015–16 Azadegan League was the 25th season of the Azadegan League and 15th as the second highest division since its establishment in 1991. The season featured 15 teams from the 2014–15 Azadegan League, two new teams relegated from the 2014–15 Persian Gulf Pro League (Paykan and Naft Masjed Soleyman) and two new teams promoted from the 2014–15 League 2 (Aluminium Arak as champions and Kheybar Khorramabad). Khooneh be Khooneh replaced Bahman Shiraz while Machine Sazi replaced Shahrdari Tabriz. The league started on 17 August 2015 and ended on 16 May 2016. Paykan won the Azadegan League title for the second time in their history. Paykan, Machine Sazi and Sanat Naft were promoted to the Persian Gulf Pro League.

== Teams ==
=== Stadia and locations ===
Locations of clubs

Team	City	Venue	Capacity
Aluminium Arak	Arak	Imam Khomeini	15,000
Aluminium Hormozgan	Bandar Abbas	Persian Gulf	20,000
Damash Gilan	Rasht	Dr. Azodi	11,000
Fajr Sepasi	Shiraz	Hafezieh	15,000
Foolad Yazd	Yazd	Shahid Nassiri	6,000
Giti Pasand	Isfahan	Daneshgah Azad	9,000
Gol Gohar	Sirjan	Gol Gohar Sport Complex	3,200
Iranjavan	Bushehr	Shahid Beheshti	15,000
Kheybar Khorramabad	Khorramabad	Takhti Khorramabad	10,000
Khooneh be Khooneh	Babol	Haft-e Tir	6,000
Machine Sazi	Tabriz	Bagh Shomal	20,000
Mes Kerman	Kerman	Shahid Bahonar	15,430
Mes Rafsanjan	Rafsanjan	Shohadaye Noushabad	5,000
Naft Masjed Soleyman	Masjed Soleyman	Behnam Mohammadi	8,000
Nassaji Mazandaran	Qaem Shahr	Vatani	15,000
Parseh Tehran	Tehran	Kargaran	5,000
PAS Hamedan	Hamedan	Qods	8,000
Paykan	Tehran	Shahre Qods	25,000
Sanat Naft	Abadan	Takhti Abadan	22,000
Shahrdari Ardabil	Ardabil	Ali Daei; Takhti Ardabil	20,000; 3,000

== League table ==
Pos	Team	Pld	W	D	L	GF	GA	GD	Pts	Promotion or relegation
1	Paykan (C, P)	38	18	16	4	50	29	+21	70	Promotion to 2016–17 Persian Gulf Pro League
2	Machine Sazi (P)	38	16	15	7	53	36	+17	63	Promotion to 2016–17 Persian Gulf Pro League
3	Sanat Naft (P)	38	16	14	8	51	38	+13	62	Promotion to 2016–17 Persian Gulf Pro League
4	Fajr Sepasi	38	16	12	10	39	28	+11	60	
5	Mes Rafsanjan	38	14	16	8	44	35	+9	58	
6	Khooneh be Khooneh	38	14	16	8	39	34	+5	58	
7	Mes Kerman	38	14	13	11	37	33	+4	55	
8	Nassaji Mazandaran	38	14	11	13	39	40	−1	53	
9	Aluminium Arak	38	10	20	8	47	41	+6	50	
10	Naft Masjed Soleyman	38	10	18	10	39	39	0	48	
11	Gol Gohar	38	9	20	9	35	34	+1	47	
12	Kheybar Khorramabad	38	11	14	13	42	46	−4	47	
13	Iranjavan	38	11	12	15	42	54	−12	45	
14	Foolad Yazd	38	10	14	14	31	38	−7	44	
15	Parseh Tehran	38	8	18	12	44	47	−3	42	
16	PAS Hamedan (R)	38	10	12	16	34	40	−6	42	Relegation to 2016–17 2nd Division
17	Sh. Ardabil (R)	38	9	13	16	43	49	−6	40	Relegation to 2016–17 2nd Division
18	Giti Pasand (R)	38	8	15	15	26	41	−15	39	Relegation to 2016–17 2nd Division
19	Damash (R)	38	8	13	17	29	43	−14	37	Relegation to 2016–17 2nd Division
20	Aluminium Hormozgan (R)	38	6	14	18	32	51	−19	32	Relegation to 2016–17 2nd Division

Updated to match(es) played on 19 May 2016. Source:
Rules for classification: 1) points; 2) goal difference; 3) number of goals scored.
(C) Champions; (P) Promoted; (R) Relegated

== Results ==
Home \ Away	ALU	ALH	DMG	FJR	FOY	SGP	GOL	IRJ	KHE	KBK	MST	MSR	NFT	NSJ	PAT	PAS	PAY	MES	SNA	SHA
Aluminium Arak		3–3	4–3	1–1	1–1	2–1	0–0	3–2	3–0	4–0	1–2	1–0	0–0	1–1	2–2	2–1	1–1	1–1	2–2	3–0
Aluminium Hormozgan	0–0		0–0	0–2	2–0	1–1	2–0	0–0	0–1	1–2	1–2	0–1	2–0	0–0	1–1	0–3	1–1	2–2	1–1	2–5
Damash	1–1	3–0		1–0	0–0	1–2	1–0	0–0	0–0	2–1	1–0	1–2	2–2	1–1	0–0	1–0	1–2	0–2	0–0	1–0
Fajr Sepasi	1–0	1–0	3–1		1–1	2–0	1–1	1–2	5–2	1–0	0–1	0–0	1–0	1–0	2–0	1–0	0–0	1–0	0–2	0–0
Foolad Yazd	0–1	0–1	1–0	1–0		1–1	0–0	2–2	1–1	1–0	1–2	1–1	1–0	1–0	3–5	1–0	0–1	0–0	2–0	1–0
Giti Pasand	0–2	1–0	0–1	3–1	3–1		0–0	1–1	1–1	1–0	2–1	0–0	1–1	0–0	1–0	0–1	0–0	0–1	0–0	1–0
Gol Gohar	1–0	1–1	2–1	0–0	0–0	1–1		2–2	1–0	0–1	2–0	0–0	0–0	1–1	2–2	2–1	1–0	1–1	3–1	1–2
Iranjavan	3–0	1–0	0–0	0–1	0–1	1–1	0–0		0–3	1–1	2–1	1–2	0–3	2–1	2–2	1–0	3–1	1–0	2–0	2–1
Kheybar Khorramabad	1–0	3–0	2–1	1–2	1–1	2–1	2–2	2–1		0–1	1–0	0–0	0–0	0–1	3–0	2–0	0–0	2–0	2–3	3–3
Khooneh be Khooneh	0–0	1–0	1–1	0–2	1–1	1–1	1–0	2–1	0–0		2–2	1–0	2–0	1–0	2–0	1–0	1–1	2–2	2–1	2–0
Machine Sazi	1–1	3–0	2–1	2–1	2–0	0–0	2–1	1–1	3–3	2–2		3–0	3–1	1–0	1–1	3–1	1–1	0–0	2–0	1–1
Mes Rafsanjan	2–0	1–1	1–0	1–1	3–3	3–0	1–2	3–1	0–1	2–1	1–1		2–1	4–1	0–0	1–0	1–0	1–2	0–0	2–2
Naft Masjed Soleyman	3–2	1–1	3–0	1–0	1–0	2–1	1–1	2–2	2–2	0–0	1–2	1–1		1–0	2–1	1–1	0–1	1–0	0–0	0–0
Nassaji Mazandaran	0–0	1–3	1–1	0–2	1–0	3–1	3–2	4–1	2–1	1–0	1–1	1–1	2–0		1–0	1–1	1–2	1–0	1–4	2–1
Parseh Tehran	1–1	3–2	2–2	0–0	1–1	2–0	1–1	3–1	1–1	1–2	0–0	1–2	0–0	0–2		5–0	0–1	1–1	2–2	1–0
PAS Hamedan	1–1	1–1	1–0	1–1	1–0	0–0	1–1	0–1	3–0	1–1	1–0	3–1	3–2	0–1	1–1		0–0	3–1	0–0	1–1
Paykan	1–1	1–0	3–0	2–0	2–1	2–0	1–0	3–0	3–2	1–1	2–2	1–1	1–1	2–0	3–1	1–0		0–0	1–2	1–1
Mes Kerman	0–0	2–0	2–0	0–0	2–1	1–0	0–1	3–2	1–0	0–0	1–0	1–2	3–3	1–0	1–0	1–0	1–2		1–2	1–1
Sanat Naft	1–1	3–0	1–0	2–1	1–0	2–0	2–1	2–0	1–0	0–0	1–1	1–0	0–0	2–2	1–2	2–1	2–2	1–2		5–0
Sh. Ardabil	3–1	2–0	1–0	2–2	0–1	3–0	1–1	2–0	0–0	3–3	0–2	0–0	1–2	0–1	0–1	1–2	1–2	1–0	4–1	

Updated to match(es) played on 19 May 2016. Source:
Legend: Blue = home team win; Yellow = draw; Red = away team win.

== Clubs season-progress ==
Team ╲ Round	1	2	3	4	5	6	7	8	9	10	11	12	13	14	15	16	17	18	19	20	21	22	23	24	25	26	27	28	29	30	31	32	33	34	35	36	37	38
Aluminium Arak	D	D	D	D	W	L	D	L	W	W	D	W	D	W	D	W	D	D	L	L	D	D	L	L	D	D	W	D	W	D	D	D	D	D	L	W	L	W
Aluminium Hormozgan	L	D	W	L	L	W	D	D	L	D	D	D	L	D	L	D	D	D	L	L	L	D	D	L	W	D	L	L	L	L	L	L	L	L	L	W	W	D
Damash	L	W	L	W	L	L	D	L	D	D	W	L	W	D	D	L	D	L	W	L	L	L	L	W	W	D	D	D	D	L	L	L	W	L	D	L	D	D
Fajr Sepasi	W	D	D	W	D	W	W	W	W	W	W	L	D	D	W	W	D	D	L	W	L	W	D	D	L	L	L	L	W	D	L	D	D	W	W	L	W	L
Foolad Yazd	W	D	L	D	D	L	D	L	L	W	D	L	L	D	W	W	D	D	L	L	L	L	D	D	L	D	D	D	L	W	L	W	L	W	D	W	W	W
Giti Pasand	L	D	L	W	W	D	L	W	D	L	D	L	D	D	W	L	W	D	D	L	D	W	D	L	L	W	D	D	L	L	D	L	W	L	D	D	L	L
Gol Gohar	D	D	L	W	D	W	L	L	L	W	W	L	L	D	D	D	L	D	L	W	D	D	D	D	D	W	L	W	D	D	D	W	D	D	D	D	D	W
Iranjavan	L	D	L	W	L	W	D	L	D	D	W	L	W	L	D	D	L	D	W	W	L	W	W	W	L	D	W	D	L	L	D	D	L	D	W	L	L	L
Kheybar	W	D	D	L	W	D	D	W	L	L	L	W	L	D	D	L	W	D	L	D	W	W	D	W	W	D	L	L	D	D	L	W	D	W	L	W	D	L
Khooneh be Khooneh	L	D	W	L	W	D	W	W	W	W	D	L	W	D	D	W	D	W	L	L	W	D	W	W	D	L	W	L	D	L	D	D	L	D	D	D	D	D
Machine Sazi	W	D	W	D	D	D	D	W	L	D	L	W	L	W	D	D	L	D	W	W	L	W	W	W	D	D	L	D	W	W	W	D	W	W	D	D	W	L
Mes Rafsanjan	D	D	D	D	L	D	L	W	L	L	D	W	D	W	D	W	W	D	D	L	W	L	D	W	L	W	D	W	W	D	W	D	W	W	D	D	L	W
Mes Kerman	W	L	W	L	W	L	W	D	W	W	L	D	W	D	D	W	D	D	W	W	D	W	D	L	D	L	W	D	L	D	W	L	W	D	L	D	L	L
Naft MIS	D	D	L	L	L	W	W	W	L	D	D	L	W	L	D	D	D	D	W	W	D	D	D	D	D	D	D	L	W	W	W	D	L	L	D	L	D	L
Nassaji	W	D	D	W	L	D	L	W	D	L	L	W	D	W	D	L	W	D	W	W	D	L	L	L	W	W	W	D	L	W	L	W	W	L	D	D	L	W
Parseh Tehran	L	D	D	D	L	L	D	D	W	D	L	W	L	L	L	D	L	D	W	D	W	D	W	L	L	W	L	W	D	D	D	D	L	W	D	D	D	D
PAS Hamedan	D	L	D	L	W	D	D	L	W	L	D	L	W	L	D	L	D	D	L	W	W	L	L	D	L	L	W	L	D	W	W	L	D	L	D	L	W	W
Paykan	W	D	W	W	W	W	D	L	W	D	D	W	D	D	D	W	D	D	W	W	W	L	D	W	W	D	D	L	W	D	W	D	L	D	D	W	W	D
Sanat Naft	W	D	D	D	D	D	W	D	W	D	D	W	L	D	D	L	L	W	W	L	D	W	L	L	W	L	W	W	W	D	D	D	W	W	W	W	D	W
Sh. Ardabil	D	W	W	L	D	L	L	L	L	D	D	W	W	D	L	L	W	L	L	L	D	L	W	D	W	D	L	L	L	D	D	W	D	L	W	L	D	D

Source: lig1.ir
W = Win; D = Draw; L = Lose

== Attendance ==
=== Average home attendance ===
Pos	Team	Total	High	Low	Average	Change
1	Nassaji	116,100	15,000	0	8,931	n/a
2	Kheybar	103,800	10,000	0	7,414	n/a
3	Fajr Sepasi	64,550	8,000	3,000	4,034	n/a
4	Sanat Naft	65,300	15,000	200	3,628	n/a
5	Machine Sazi	52,450	15,500	150	3,497	n/a
6	Aluminium Arak	48,500	5,000	2,000	3,464	n/a
7	Khooneh be Khooneh	54,500	5,000	500	3,406	n/a
8	Damash	43,750	8,250	500	2,917	n/a
9	Naft MIS	31,264	5,100	0	2,233	n/a
10	Sh. Ardabil	34,390	6,000	500	2,149	n/a
11	Gol Gohar	32,000	3,000	1,000	2,000	n/a
12	Iranjavan	31,700	3,500	700	1,761	n/a
13	PAS Hamedan	17,500	3,000	900	1,346	n/a
14	Mes Kerman	20,600	7,000	50	1,212	n/a
15	Mes Rafsanjan	14,600	2,000	200	913	n/a
16	Aluminium Hormozgan	10,000	2,000	100	667	n/a
17	Foolad Yazd	6,178	1,500	150	386	n/a
18	Paykan	6,300	1,000	50	371	n/a
19	Giti Pasand	6,249	1,500	50	368	n/a
20	Parseh Tehran	2,039	300	49	120	n/a
	League total	761,770	15,500	0	2,539	n/a

Updated to games played on 16 May 2016
Source: lig1.ir
Notes:
Matches with spectator bans are not included in average attendances
Not all matches are included in average attendances
Naft MIS and Paykan played last season in Persian Gulf Pro League
Aluminium Arak, Kheybar Khorramabad and Khooneh Be Khooneh played last season in League 2

=== Highest attendance ===
Rank	Home team	Score	Away team	Attendance	Date	Week	Stadium
1	Machine Sazi	3–0	Mes Rafsanjan	15,500	10 May 2016	37	Sahand
2	Nassaji	1–1	Machine Sazi	15,000	16 November 2015	15	Vatani
2	Sanat Naft	2–1	Fajr Sepasi	15,000	16 May 2016	38	Takhti Abadan
4	Nassaji	1–0	Khooneh be Khooneh	14,500	4 September 2015	4	Vatani
5	Nassaji	1–4	Sanat Naft	12,100	20 January 2016	22	Vatani
6	Nassaji	0–2	Fajr Sepasi	12,000	13 October 2015	10	Vatani
7	Nassaji	1–1	PAS Hamedan	10,000	16 September 2015	6	Vatani
7	Kheybar Khorramabad	1–2	Fajr Sepasi	10,000	23 November 2015	16	Takhti Khorramabad
7	Nassaji	1–0	Mes Kerman	10,000	14 February 2016	26	Vatani
7	Machine Sazi	1–0	Nassaji	10,000	18 April 2016	34	Bagh Shomal

Notes:
Updated to games played on 16 May 2016. Source: lig1.ir

== See also ==
- 2015–16 Persian Gulf Pro League
- 2015–16 Iran Football's 2nd Division
- 2015–16 Iran Football's 3rd Division
- 2015–16 Hazfi Cup
- Iranian Super Cup
- 2015–16 Iranian Futsal Super League
