= Mohsen Ashouri =

Iranian footballer and football coach

Personal information
- Full name: Mohsen Ashouri
- Date of birth: January 2, 1965 (age 61)
- Place of birth: Noshahr, Mazandaran, Iran
- Position: Left winger

Senior career*
Years	Team	Apps	(Gls)
1987–1997	Persepolis	170	(20)
1992–1993	→ Al-Ittihad (loan)	27	(3)
Total		197	(23)

International career
1988–1992	Iran	12	(0)

Managerial career
- 1997: Persepolis (Player-Coach)
- 2001–2004: Persepolis U–23
- 2006–2007: Persepolis U–20
- 2008–2009: Pas Hamedan (assistant)
- 2009–2010: Paykan (assistant)
- 2011–2012: Persepolis (assistant)
- 2012-2013: Pas Hamedan
- 2014: Khoone Be Khoone (assistant)
- 2017: Shahrdari Fouman
- 2017–2019: Khooshe Talaei
- 2020: Khooshe Talaei
- 2020–2021: Baadraan
- 2021–: Kheybar Khorramabad
- * Club domestic league appearances and goals

Mohsen Ashouri (Persian: محسن عاشوری; born January 2, 1965) is a retired Iranian football player and a current coach.

== Honours ==
=== Club ===
Persepolis

- Iranian Football League (2): 1995-96, 1996-97
- Asian Cup Winners' Cup (1): 1990–91
- Hazfi Cup (2): 1987–88, 1991–92
- Tehran Clubs Championship League (3): 1987–88, 1989–90, 1990–91

=== National ===
Iran

- Asian Games Gold Medal (1): 1990
