= Chooka Talesh F.C. =

Iranian football club

- Full name: Chooka Talesh Cultural and Sport Club
- Nicknames: Green Cassocks (Persian: سبزقباها, Sabz Qabāhā); Eagles (Persian: عقاب‌ها, Oqābhā)
- Founded: 1991; 29 years ago
- Ground: Pouria Vali Stadium; Talesh; Iran
- Capacity: 10,000
- Chairman: (Iran) Arash Riazimand
- Head Coach: (Iran) Mehdi Pashazadeh
- League: Azadegan League
- 2020–21: 16th (relegated)
- Website: https://fc-chookatalesh.ir/
Home colours	Away colours

Chooka Talesh Football Club (Talysh: Čuká Táleš Futboli Klub, Persian: باشگاه فوتبال چوکای تالش, Bashgah-e Futbal-e Chuka-e Tālesh) is an Iranian football club based in Talesh, Iran. They currently compete in League 2. Majid Akbari

== History ==
=== Chooka Anzali ===
In 1991 Chooka Anzali Football Club was founded in Anzali, Gilan Province. They were promoted to the Azadegan League (back then the top league in Iran) in 1993 after winning the 2nd Division. The club was relegated in 1995 and was promoted back in 1998.

=== Chooka Talesh ===
The same year the club was promoted back to the top tier they moved to the rural town of Talesh. Chooka was once again relegated to the 2nd tier in 2000, and they eventually dropped to the 4th tier in 2007.

== Honours ==
=== Domestic competitions ===
==== League ====
- League 2:
  - Winners (4): 1992–93, 2019–20، 2021–22: Chooka Talesh

== Season-by-season ==
The table below chronicles the achievements of Chooka Talesh in various competitions since 1992.

Season	Division	League	Position	Hazfi Cup	Notes
1992–93	2	2nd Division	1st		Promoted
1993–94	1	Azadegan League	10th
1994–95	1	Azadegan League	8th		Relegated
1995–96	2	2nd Division	5th
1996–97	2	2nd Division	7th
1997–98	2	2nd Division	3rd		Promoted
1998–99	1	Azadegan League	6th
1999-00	1	Azadegan League	13th		Relegated
2000–01	2	2nd Division	4th
2001–02	2	Azadegan League	10th		Relegated
2002–03	3	2nd Division	4th
2003–04	3	2nd Division	12th
2004–05	3	2nd Division	9th
2005–06	3	2nd Division	6th
2006–07	3	2nd Division	14th		Relegated
2007–08	4	3rd Division	6th
2008–09	4	3rd Division	7th
2009–10	4	3rd Division	3rd	Did not qualify	Promoted
2010–11	3	2nd Division	8th/Group A	Did not qualify
2011–12	3	2nd Division	11th	Second Round
2012–13	3	2nd Division	12th	Did not enter	Relegated
2013–14	4	3rd Division	4th	Did not qualify
2014–15	4	3rd Division	11th	Did not qualify
2015–16	4	3rd Division	3rd	Did not qualify
2016–17	4	3rd Division	5th	Did not qualify
2017–18	4	3rd Division	1st	Did not qualify	Promoted
2018-19	3	2nd Division	7th/Group A	Fourth Round
2019-20	3	2nd Division	1st	Did not qualify	Promoted
2020-21	2	Azadegan League	16th	Third Round	Relegated

== Past managers ==
- Ghafour Jahani (1992–1997)
- Bahman Salehnia (1997–2000)
- Alireza Rokhcheka
- Nosrat Irandoost (July 22, 2011 – 2014)
- Ali Namdari (January 10, 2021–now)
