= Vahid Bayatlou =

Iranian football manager (born 1987)

Vahid Bayatloo
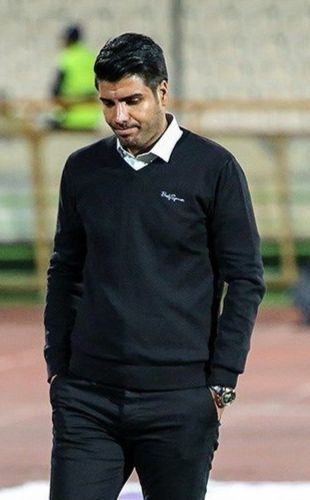

Personal information
- Full name: Vahid Bayatloo
- Date of birth: 1987 (age 38–39)
- Place of birth: Iran

Team information
- Current team: Khooshe Talaei (manager)

Youth career
- Years: Team
- Saipa
- Damash Lorestan
- Dorna

Managerial career
- Damash Lorestan (analyst)
- Dorna (youth)
- Rah Ahan (youth)
- Caspian Qazvin (analyst)
- Payam Mashhad (assistant)
- Naft o Gaze Gachsaran (assistant)
- Shahrdari Urmia
- 2016–2017: Moghavemat Tehran (assistant)
- 2018–2020: Navad Urmia
- 2020: Tractor (assistant)
- 2020: Machine Sazi
- 2021–2022: Khooshe Talaei

Vahid Bayatloo (Persian: وحید بیاتلو) is an Iranian football manager who is currently the head coach of Khooshe Talaei in Azadegan League. Bayatloo is the youngest coach in the history of the Iranian Premier League and League One.
