= 2016–17 Iran Football's 3rd Division =

Iran Football's 3rd Division
- Season: 2016–17

The article contains information about the 2016–17 Iran 3rd Division football season. This is the 4th rated football league in Iran after the Persian Gulf Cup, Azadegan League, and 2nd Division. The league started from October 2016.

In total and in the first round, 65 teams will compete in 5 different groups.

== First round ==
=== Group A ===
Pos	Team	Pld	W	D	L	GF	GA	GD	Pts	Qualification or relegation
1	Entezar Bojnord	12	8	4	0	22	4	+18	28	Promotion to Second Round
2	Esteghlal Javan Khanbebin	12	7	5	0	23	10	+13	26	Promotion to Second Round
3	Shohadaye Sari	12	7	2	3	35	20	+15	23	
4	Arash Rey	12	7	1	4	25	16	+9	22	
5	Esteghlal Lamouk	12	4	7	1	17	12	+5	19	Relegation to Provincial Leagues 2017–18
6	Shemiran Tehran	12	6	1	5	19	17	+2	19	Relegation to Provincial Leagues 2017–18
7	Shirin Faraz Aghghala	12	4	5	3	20	18	+2	17	Relegation to Provincial Leagues 2017–18
8	Aramesh Toosh Mashhad	12	4	3	5	11	13	−2	15	Relegation to Provincial Leagues 2017–18
9	Keshavarz Lavasan	12	4	2	6	22	21	+1	14	Relegation to Provincial Leagues 2017–18
10	Steel Adineh	12	3	1	8	12	29	−17	10	Relegation to Provincial Leagues 2017–18
11	Esteghlal Miandoroud	12	2	3	7	10	21	−11	9	Relegation to Provincial Leagues 2017–18
12	Pirouzi Garmsar	12	3	0	9	5	25	−20	9	Relegation to Provincial Leagues 2017–18
13	Yaran Hejazi	12	1	2	9	6	21	−15	5	Relegation to Provincial Leagues 2017–18

Updated to match(es) played on 15 January 2017. Source:
Rules for classification: 1) points; 2) goal difference; 3) number of goals scored.

=== Group B ===
Pos	Team	Pld	W	D	L	GF	GA	GD	Pts	Qualification or relegation
1	Shohadaye Makeran	11	7	3	1	20	6	+14	24	Promotion to Second Round
2	Shohadaye Razakan	11	6	4	1	19	10	+9	22	Promotion to Second Round
3	Omran Shahrdari Sari	11	5	4	2	18	12	+6	19	
4	Kaveh Shahrdari Varamin	11	6	0	5	17	13	+4	18	
5	Sorkh Jamegan Arya	11	5	2	4	20	19	+1	17	Relegation to Provincial Leagues 2017–18
6	Mirza Kouchak Some'e Sara	11	4	3	4	9	7	+2	15	Relegation to Provincial Leagues 2017–18
7	Fatehan Pas Qom	11	4	2	5	11	13	−2	14	Relegation to Provincial Leagues 2017–18
8	Shahrdari Astara	11	4	2	5	15	18	−3	14	Relegation to Provincial Leagues 2017–18
9	Padideh Parsabad Moghan	11	4	2	5	10	14	−4	14	Relegation to Provincial Leagues 2017–18
10	Sobhan Daru Rasht	11	3	3	5	19	19	0	12	Relegation to Provincial Leagues 2017–18
11	Farid Karaj	11	2	3	6	9	18	−9	9	Relegation to Provincial Leagues 2017–18
12	Arya Sepahan Tehran	11	1	2	8	8	26	−18	5	Relegation to Provincial Leagues 2017–18

Updated to match(es) played on 15 December 2016. Source:
Rules for classification: 1) points; 2) goal difference; 3) number of goals scored.

=== Group C ===
Pos	Team	Pld	W	D	L	GF	GA	GD	Pts	Qualification or relegation
1	Parag	11	8	2	1	23	5	+18	26	Promotion to Second Round
2	Alominium Abeskon	11	6	4	1	16	4	+12	22	Promotion to Second Round
3	Oghab Tabriz	11	6	3	2	12	5	+7	21	
4	Mahan Tandis	11	5	3	3	19	14	+5	18	
5	Bahrebardari Metro	11	5	3	3	15	12	+3	18	Relegation to Provincial Leagues 2017–18
6	Abidar Sanandaj	11	5	2	4	16	14	+2	17	Relegation to Provincial Leagues 2017–18
7	Kavian Naghade	11	4	2	5	11	15	−4	14	Relegation to Provincial Leagues 2017–18
8	Shahid Bagheri	11	4	1	6	20	21	−1	13	Relegation to Provincial Leagues 2017–18
9	Mehregan Dare	10	3	4	3	10	13	−3	13	Relegation to Provincial Leagues 2017–18
10	Rastegar Zanjan	11	2	4	5	11	16	−5	10	Relegation to Provincial Leagues 2017–18
11	Shahin Mehr Tehran	11	3	1	7	11	18	−7	10	Relegation to Provincial Leagues 2017–18
12	Almas Khalkhal	11	3	1	7	10	20	−10	10	Relegation to Provincial Leagues 2017–18
13	Fajr Dehloran	11	1	2	8	13	30	−17	5	Relegation to Provincial Leagues 2017–18

Updated to match(es) played on 15 November 2016. Source:
Rules for classification: 1) points; 2) goal difference; 3) number of goals scored.

=== Group D ===
Pos	Team	Pld	W	D	L	GF	GA	GD	Pts	Qualification or relegation
1	Persepolis Borazjan	11	7	1	3	22	9	+13	22	Promotion to Second Round
2	Kian Bakhtiari	11	7	1	3	18	9	+9	22	Promotion to Second Round
3	Abuzar Basht	11	6	2	3	17	16	+1	20	
4	Payam Choghadak	11	5	4	2	12	5	+7	19	
5	Pardis Khoram abad	11	5	4	2	13	9	+4	19	Relegation to Provincial Leagues 2017–18
6	Persepolis Shoush	11	5	3	3	30	12	+18	18	Relegation to Provincial Leagues 2017–18
7	Esteghlal Molasani	11	5	3	3	18	12	+6	18	Relegation to Provincial Leagues 2017–18
8	Esteghlal Shoushtar	11	4	4	3	19	16	+3	16	Relegation to Provincial Leagues 2017–18
9	Naftoun	11	4	4	3	15	16	−1	16	Relegation to Provincial Leagues 2017–18
10	Shohada Shahbaz	12	2	5	5	15	22	−7	11	Relegation to Provincial Leagues 2017–18
11	Azna Javan	11	2	2	7	12	20	−8	8	Relegation to Provincial Leagues 2017–18
12	Esteghlal Khoramshahr	11	2	0	9	8	23	−15	6	Relegation to Provincial Leagues 2017–18
13	Periz Dodoud	11	1	1	9	10	40	−30	4	Relegation to Provincial Leagues 2017–18

Updated to match(es) played on 15 November 2016. Source:
Rules for classification: 1) points; 2) goal difference; 3) number of goals scored.

=== Group E ===
Pos	Team	Pld	W	D	L	GF	GA	GD	Pts	Qualification or relegation
1	Shahrdari Bam	11	8	3	0	29	10	+19	27	Promotion to Second Round
2	Mes Novin Kerman	11	7	2	2	16	6	+10	23	Promotion to Second Round
3	Jahad Sirjan	11	7	1	3	20	10	+10	22	
4	Setaregan Bestano	10	6	3	1	18	6	+12	21	
5	Fajr Rafsanjan	11	5	3	3	15	12	+3	18	Relegation to Provincial Leagues 2017–18
6	Safahan Esfahan	11	5	3	3	15	15	0	18	Relegation to Provincial Leagues 2017–18
7	Ghermezpoush Kish	11	5	1	5	23	12	+11	16	Relegation to Provincial Leagues 2017–18
8	Arman Sadra Shiraz	12	4	3	5	16	14	+2	15	Relegation to Provincial Leagues 2017–18
9	Khane Honarmandan Aran Va Bidgol	10	4	1	5	12	15	−3	13	Relegation to Provincial Leagues 2017–18
10	Parse Shiraz	11	3	2	6	12	18	−6	11	Relegation to Provincial Leagues 2017–18
11	Bastani Etemadian Ghaem	11	3	1	7	8	21	−13	10	Relegation to Provincial Leagues 2017–18
12	Ansar Beh Abad	11	1	2	8	4	18	−14	5	Relegation to Provincial Leagues 2017–18
13	Tondar Nik Shahr	11	0	1	10	3	34	−31	1	Relegation to Provincial Leagues 2017–18

Updated to match(es) played on 15 November 2016. Source:
Rules for classification: 1) points; 2) goal difference; 3) number of goals scored.

== Second round ==
Second Round will be started after first round (January 2017)

Promotion and Relegation:

First team of each group (total: 3 teams) will promote to second division.

Teams ranked 2 in each group and the best 3rd place team, will promote to playoff round.

In playoff round, two teams of four, will promote to second division. (Totally 5 teams will promote)

Other 3rd ranked teams who did not qualify to playoff round, and teams ranked 4th & 5th and the best placed 6th team (total: 11 teams) will play in second round of next season.

Teams ranked 7th or below and the two worst placed 6th teams will play in first round of next season.

=== Group A (North) ===
Pos	Team	Pld	W	D	L	GF	GA	GD	Pts	Promotion or qualification
1	Koushe Talaei Saveh	17	10	4	3	0	0	0	34	Promotion to 2nd Division 2017–18
2	Moghavemat Tehran	17	8	6	3	0	0	0	30	Promotion to 2nd Division 2017–18
3	Shahrdari Kamyaran	17	5	9	3	0	0	0	24	Second Round - 3rd Division 2017-18
4	Shohadaye Razkan Karaj	17	7	3	7	0	0	0	24	Second Round - 3rd Division 2017-18
5	Payam Moghavemat Sari	17	6	6	5	0	0	0	24	Second Round - 3rd Division 2017-18
6	Meli Poshan Tabriz	17	6	4	7	0	0	0	22	First Round - 3rd Division 2017-18
7	Chooka	17	6	3	8	0	0	0	21	First Round - 3rd Division 2017-18
8	Sanat Sari	17	5	5	7	0	0	0	20	First Round - 3rd Division 2017-18
9	Etehad Sari	17	4	7	6	0	0	0	19	First Round - 3rd Division 2017-18
10	Alominum Abeskon	17	3	3	11	0	0	0	12	First Round - 3rd Division 2017-18

Updated to match(es) played on 30 May 2016. Source:
Rules for classification: 1) points; 2) goal difference; 3) number of goals scored.

=== Group B (Center & East ) ===
Pos	Team	Pld	W	D	L	GF	GA	GD	Pts	Promotion or qualification
1	Persepolis Mashhad	18	11	4	3	33	21	+12	37	Promotion to 2nd Division 2017–18
2	Shohada Babolsar	18	8	9	1	30	16	+14	33	Promotion to 2nd Division 2017–18
3	Esteghlal Javan Khanbebin	18	9	6	3	22	15	+7	33	Second Round - 3rd Division 2017-18
4	Entezar Bojnord	18	7	7	4	28	14	+14	28	Second Round - 3rd Division 2017-18
5	Shohada Makran Miandoroud	18	7	4	7	28	18	+10	25	Second Round - 3rd Division 2017-18
6	Espidar Tehran	18	6	7	5	20	18	+2	25	First Round - 3rd Division 2017-18
7	Esteghlal Novin Bojnourd	18	7	3	8	20	18	+2	24	First Round - 3rd Division 2017-18
8	Nasle Aboumoslem Mashhad	18	4	6	8	0	0	0	18	First Round - 3rd Division 2017-18
9	Omid Hasan Abad	18	3	3	12	18	35	−17	12	First Round - 3rd Division 2017-18
10	Bahman Sabz Alborz	18	2	3	13	11	43	−32	9	First Round - 3rd Division 2017-18

Updated to match(es) played on 30 May 2016. Source:
Rules for classification: 1) points; 2) goal difference; 3) number of goals scored.

=== Group C (South) ===
Pos	Team	Pld	W	D	L	GF	GA	GD	Pts	Promotion or qualification
1	Mes Novin Kerman	18	10	6	2	32	15	+17	36	Promotion to 2nd Division 2017–18
2	Sh. Bam	18	11	3	4	39	24	+15	36	3rd Division 2016-17 Play Off
3	Hafari Ahvaz	18	10	4	4	41	17	+24	34	3rd Division 2016-17 Play Off
4	Kiyan Bakhtiyari	18	10	2	6	30	20	+10	32	Second Round - 3rd Division 2017-18
5	Per. Ganaveh	18	6	6	6	23	28	−5	24	Second Round - 3rd Division 2017-18
6	Parag Tehran	18	6	5	7	30	23	+7	23	Second Round - 3rd Division 2017-18
7	Bargh Shiraz	18	4	6	8	13	22	−9	18	First Round - 3rd Division 2017-18
8	Per. Borazjan	18	3	7	8	13	23	−10	16	First Round - 3rd Division 2017-18
9	Sh. Firuzabad	18	3	6	9	13	32	−19	15	First Round - 3rd Division 2017-18
10	Shahin Pars Tehran	18	3	3	12	18	48	−30	12	First Round - 3rd Division 2017-18

Updated to match(es) played on 15 February 2017. Source:
Rules for classification: 1) points; 2) goal difference; 3) number of goals scored.

== Playoff ==
Team 1	Score	Team 2	1st Leg	2nd Leg
Shohadaye Babolsar	2-2	Melli Haffari Ahvaz	1-0	1-2
Shahrdari Bam	2-0	Moghavemat Tehran	0-0	2-0

The winner will be promoted to 2017–18 Iran Football's 2nd Division.
