= 2015–16 Iran Football's 3rd Division =

Iran Football's 3rd Division
- Season: 2015–16
- Promoted: Shahrdari Fuman; Shahrdari Hamedan; Shahrdari Arak; Qashqai Shiraz; Shahin Mahshahr; Shahid Karimi Jooybar

The article contains information about the 2015–16 Iran 3rd Division football season. This is the 4th rated football league in Iran after the Persian Gulf Cup, Azadegan League, and 2nd Division. The league started from September 2015.

In total and in the first round, 60 teams will compete in 5 different groups.

== First round ==
Promotion and Relegation: Top two teams from each group will promote to second round. Teams ranked 3rd & 4th in each group will play in first round of next season. teams ranked 5th and below will relegate to provincial leagues

=== Group A ===
Pos	Team	Pld	W	D	L	GF	GA	GD	Pts	Promotion or relegation
1	Kaveh Parsa Varamin	9	6	2	1	15	7	+8	20	Promotion to Second round
2	Omran Sari	9	6	0	3	15	9	+6	18	Promotion to Second round
3	Esteghlal Miandorud	9	4	2	3	15	11	+4	14	
4	Shirin Faraz Aqqala	9	4	2	3	11	12	−1	14	
5	Heyat Zirab	9	3	4	2	8	8	0	13	Relegation to Provincial Leagues 2016–17
6	Fajr Misagh	9	3	3	3	10	6	+4	12	Relegation to Provincial Leagues 2016–17
7	Sh. Quchan	9	3	3	3	10	7	+3	12	Relegation to Provincial Leagues 2016–17
8	Moghavemat Novin Sari	9	2	4	3	12	15	−3	10	Relegation to Provincial Leagues 2016–17
9	Pirouzi Garmsar	8	1	2	5	10	19	−9	5	Relegation to Provincial Leagues 2016–17
10	Nili Poshan Qom	8	1	0	7	5	17	−12	3	Relegation to Provincial Leagues 2016–17
11	Sh. Eslamshahr	0	0	0	0	0	0	0	0	Relegation to Provincial Leagues 2016–17
12	Oghab Tehran	0	0	0	0	0	0	0	0	Relegation to Provincial Leagues 2016–17

Updated to match(es) played on 15 December 2015. Source:
Rules for classification: 1) points; 2) goal difference; 3) number of goals scored.

=== Group B ===
Pos	Team	Pld	W	D	L	GF	GA	GD	Pts	Promotion or relegation
1	Chooka	10	7	2	1	16	5	+11	23	Promotion to Second round
2	Sh. Rudsar	10	7	1	2	16	4	+12	22	Promotion to Second round
3	Tehran Mobadel	10	6	1	3	17	7	+10	19	
4	Pars Tehran	10	5	3	2	21	8	+13	18	
5	Rahgostaran Langarud	10	5	3	2	10	7	+3	18	Relegation to Provincial Leagues 2016–17
6	Kimia Farayand Rey	10	4	1	5	18	15	+3	13	Relegation to Provincial Leagues 2016–17
7	Shohada Babolsar	10	3	4	3	12	9	+3	13	Relegation to Provincial Leagues 2016–17
8	Padideh Tat Takestan	10	4	1	5	10	22	−12	13	Relegation to Provincial Leagues 2016–17
9	Est. Qaemshahr	10	1	3	6	7	18	−11	6	Relegation to Provincial Leagues 2016–17
10	Sh. Lahijan	10	1	2	7	8	19	−11	5	Relegation to Provincial Leagues 2016–17
11	Parvaz Zanjan	10	0	3	7	6	27	−21	3	Relegation to Provincial Leagues 2016–17
12	Farhang Bilesavar	0	0	0	0	0	0	0	0	Relegation to Provincial Leagues 2016–17

Updated to match(es) played on 15 December 2015. Source:
Rules for classification: 1) points; 2) goal difference; 3) number of goals scored.

=== Group C ===
Pos	Team	Pld	W	D	L	GF	GA	GD	Pts	Promotion or relegation
1	Sh. Hamedan	10	6	4	0	16	4	+12	22	Promotion to Second round
2	Est. Jonub	10	6	3	1	15	10	+5	21	Promotion to Second round
3	Est. Molasani	10	5	4	1	17	4	+13	19	
4	Bahrebardariye Metro	10	5	2	3	19	8	+11	17	
5	Sh. Mahabad	10	5	2	3	18	10	+8	17	Relegation to Provincial Leagues 2016–17
6	Istak Marivan	10	4	4	2	14	11	+3	16	Relegation to Provincial Leagues 2016–17
7	Sh. Bonab	10	4	2	4	23	19	+4	14	Relegation to Provincial Leagues 2016–17
8	Abidar Sanandaj	10	3	3	4	13	13	0	12	Relegation to Provincial Leagues 2016–17
9	Abiphoshan Gilan-e Gharb	10	2	2	6	9	17	−8	8	Relegation to Provincial Leagues 2016–17
10	Sh. Khoy	10	1	1	8	15	21	−6	4	Relegation to Provincial Leagues 2016–17
11	Persepolis Darreh Shahr	10	0	1	9	3	45	−42	1	Relegation to Provincial Leagues 2016–17
12	Vahdat Hamedan	0	0	0	0	0	0	0	0	Relegation to Provincial Leagues 2016–17

Updated to match(es) played on 15 December 2015. Source:
Rules for classification: 1) points; 2) goal difference; 3) number of goals scored.

=== Group D ===
Pos	Team	Pld	W	D	L	GF	GA	GD	Pts	Promotion or relegation
1	Shahin Mahshahr	11	7	3	1	21	5	+16	24	Promotion to Second round
2	Safahan Isfahan	11	6	4	1	21	7	+14	22	Promotion to Second round
3	Esteghlal Shushtar	11	6	4	1	14	9	+5	22	
4	Aluminium Novin Arak	11	6	3	2	16	8	+8	21	
5	Behzisti Khorramabad	11	6	2	3	19	13	+6	20	Relegation to Provincial Leagues 2016–17
6	Petroshimi Jam	11	5	3	3	16	8	+8	18	Relegation to Provincial Leagues 2016–17
7	Jonoob Susangerd	11	4	2	5	18	22	−4	14	Relegation to Provincial Leagues 2016–17
8	Abozar Basht	11	4	1	6	13	16	−3	13	Relegation to Provincial Leagues 2016–17
9	Helal Ahmar Saveh	11	3	2	6	15	17	−2	11	Relegation to Provincial Leagues 2016–17
10	Parseh Bakhtiyari	11	2	2	7	14	22	−8	8	Relegation to Provincial Leagues 2016–17
11	Etehad Aleshtar	10	1	3	6	8	18	−10	6	Relegation to Provincial Leagues 2016–17
12	Omid Najafabad	10	0	1	9	2	32	−30	1	Relegation to Provincial Leagues 2016–17

Updated to match(es) played on 15 December 2015. Source:
Rules for classification: 1) points; 2) goal difference; 3) number of goals scored.

=== Group E ===
Pos	Team	Pld	W	D	L	GF	GA	GD	Pts	Promotion or relegation
1	Qashqai Shiraz	10	7	3	0	14	2	+12	24	Promotion to Second round
2	Khalij Fars Khoonsorkh	10	7	2	1	26	9	+17	23	Promotion to Second round
3	Parseh Shiraz	10	6	3	1	24	4	+20	21	
4	Mes Novin Kerman	10	5	4	1	14	5	+9	19	
5	Sang Ahan Bafgh	10	4	4	2	14	8	+6	16	Relegation to Provincial Leagues 2016–17
6	Varzesh Saravan	10	5	1	4	13	12	+1	16	Relegation to Provincial Leagues 2016–17
7	Esteghamat Yazd	10	4	1	5	11	11	0	13	Relegation to Provincial Leagues 2016–17
8	Fajr Shahreza	10	3	2	5	10	12	−2	11	Relegation to Provincial Leagues 2016–17
9	Sh. Badrud	8	1	0	7	1	17	−16	3	Relegation to Provincial Leagues 2016–17
10	Helal Ahmar Kish	9	1	0	8	6	25	−19	3	Relegation to Provincial Leagues 2016–17
11	Isar Jiroft	9	0	0	9	2	30	−28	0	Relegation to Provincial Leagues 2016–17
12	Persepolis Zahedan	0	0	0	0	0	0	0	0	Relegation to Provincial Leagues 2016–17

Updated to match(es) played on 15 December 2015. Source:
Rules for classification: 1) points; 2) goal difference; 3) number of goals scored.

== Second round ==
Promotion and Relegation: Top two teams from each group (total: 6 teams) will promote to second division. Teams ranked 3rd & 4th and two best placed 5th teams (total: 8 teams) will play in second round of next season. Teams ranked 6th or below and the worst placed 5th team will play in first round of next season.

=== Group A ===
Pos	Team	Pld	W	D	L	GF	GA	GD	Pts	Promotion or qualification
1	Sh. Fuman	16	11	2	3	25	9	+16	35	Promotion to 2nd Division 2016-17
2	Shahid Karimi Jooybar	16	9	4	3	22	11	+11	31	Promotion to 2nd Division 2016-17
3	Chooka	16	9	3	4	23	17	+6	30	Second Round - 3rd Division 2016-17
4	Esteghlal Novin Bojnourd	16	7	2	7	20	21	−1	23	Second Round - 3rd Division 2016-17
5	Shohada Babolsar	16	6	2	8	24	26	−2	20	Second Round - 3rd Division 2016-17
6	Shohada Sari	16	6	2	8	17	23	−6	20	First Round - 3rd Division 2016-17
7	Sh. Rudsar	16	6	1	9	19	20	−1	19	First Round - 3rd Division 2016-17
8	Omran Sari	16	5	3	8	15	23	−8	18	First Round - 3rd Division 2016-17
9	Arash Rey	16	2	3	11	20	37	−17	9	First Round - 3rd Division 2016-17
10	Etka Gorgan	0	0	0	0	0	0	0	0	First Round - 3rd Division 2016-17

Updated to match(es) played on 30 May 2016. Source:
Rules for classification: 1) points; 2) goal difference; 3) number of goals scored.

=== Group B ===
Pos	Team	Pld	W	D	L	GF	GA	GD	Pts	Promotion or qualification
1	Sh. Hamedan	16	8	6	2	26	12	+14	30	Promotion to 2nd Division 2016–17
2	Sh. Arak	16	8	5	3	24	14	+10	29	Promotion to 2nd Division 2016–17
3	Est. Jonub	16	8	3	5	23	17	+6	27	Second Round - 3rd Division 2016-17
4	Irandad Tehran	16	7	5	4	24	18	+6	26	Second Round - 3rd Division 2016-17
5	Fajr Misagh	16	6	3	7	20	21	−1	21	First Round - 3rd Division 2016-17
6	Omid Hasanabad	16	4	7	5	17	19	−2	19	First Round - 3rd Division 2016-17
7	Safahan Isfahan	16	2	9	5	11	20	−9	15	First Round - 3rd Division 2016-17
8	Afra Darb Azar	16	3	4	9	19	33	−14	13	First Round - 3rd Division 2016-17
9	Kaveh Parsa Varamin	16	2	6	8	14	24	−10	12	First Round - 3rd Division 2016-17
10	Ostandari Kermanshah	0	0	0	0	0	0	0	0	First Round - 3rd Division 2016-17

Updated to match(es) played on 30 May 2016. Source:
Rules for classification: 1) points; 2) goal difference; 3) number of goals scored.

=== Group C ===
Pos	Team	Pld	W	D	L	GF	GA	GD	Pts	Promotion or qualification
1	Qashqai Shiraz	18	10	6	2	34	13	+21	36	Promotion to 2nd Division 2016-17
2	Shahin Mahshahr	18	10	6	2	29	10	+19	36	Promotion to 2nd Division 2016-17
3	Hafari Ahvaz	18	9	6	3	35	19	+16	33	Second Round - 3rd Division 2016-17
4	Bargh Shiraz	18	8	6	4	26	17	+9	30	Second Round - 3rd Division 2016-17
5	Sh. Firuzabad	18	8	5	5	34	22	+12	29	Second Round - 3rd Division 2016-17
6	Naftoon Masjed Soleyman	18	6	4	8	25	27	−2	22	First Round - 3rd Division 2016-17
7	Per. Borazjan	18	4	7	7	17	22	−5	19	First Round - 3rd Division 2016-17
8	Khalij Fars Khoonsorkh	18	4	5	9	26	32	−6	17	First Round - 3rd Division 2016-17
9	Piriz Doroud	18	4	1	13	14	34	−20	13	First Round - 3rd Division 2016-17
10	Farid Karaj	18	3	2	13	14	58	−44	11	First Round - 3rd Division 2016-17

Updated to match(es) played on 30 May 2016. Source:
Rules for classification: 1) points; 2) goal difference; 3) number of goals scored.
