= Shahrdari Mahshahr C.S.C. =

Iranian football club

شهردارى ماهشهر
- Full name: Shahrdari Mahshahr Football Club
- Ground: Shohada Stadium; Mahshahr; Iran
- Capacity: 15،000
- Manager: Mehdi Pashazadeh
- League: League 2
- 2024–25: Azadegan League, 16th (relegated)
Home colours

Shahrdari Mahshahr Football Club is an Iranian football club based in Mahshahr, Iran. They currently compete in the Azadegan League.

== History ==
Shahrdari Mahshahr earned promotion to League 2 after finishing in first place of Group B in the 2014–15 edition of League 3. In 2017 for the first time in their history, the club was promoted to the 2nd tiered Azadegan League after finishing in first place of Group B.

== Season-by-season ==
The table below shows the achievements of the club in various competitions.

Season	League	Position	Hazfi Cup	Notes
2014–15	League 3	2nd/B		Promoted
2015–16	League 2	4th/B	Did not qualify
2016–17	League 2	1st/B	Round of 16	Promoted

== See also ==
- 31 different Provincial Leagues
