= Ferdowsi Samen F.C. =

Iranian association football club

Ferdowsi Samen
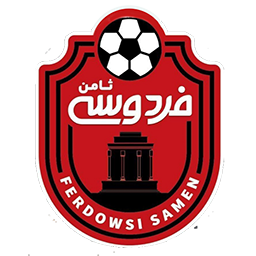
- Full name: Ferdowsi Samen Football Club
- Founded: 4 January 2016; 10 years ago ( as Khooshe Talaee F.C. )
- Ground: Samen Al-Aeme Stadium
- Capacity: 24,400
- Manager: Abbas Chamanian
- League: League 2 (Iran)
- 2024–25: 12th (Group 2)

Ferdowsi Samen Football Club is an Iranian football club based in Mashhad, Iran who compete in League 2 .

== Head coaches ==
- Morteza Moradi (2016–2017)
- Kourosh Barmak (2017)
- Nasser Ebrahimi (2017)
- Mohsen Ashouri (2017–2020)
- Sohrab Bakhtiarizadeh (2020–2021)
- Vahid Bayatlou (2021–2023)

== Honours ==
- League 2:

Winners (1): 2018–19

== See also ==
- Hazfi Cup
- 2018–19 Iran Football's 2nd Division
