= 2017–18 Iran Football's 3rd Division =

Iran Football's 3rd Division
- Season: 2017–18

The article contains information about the 2017–18 Iran 3rd Division football season. This is the 4th rated football league in Iran after the Persian Gulf Cup, Azadegan League, and 2nd Division. The league started from October 2017.

In total and in the first round, 61 teams will compete in 5 different groups.

== First round ==
Each team who give up in 2 matches, will be relegated 2 divisions for next season. Therefore, in this stage, the teams which gave up 2 matches, will be eligible to play in the provincial 2nd division for 2018–19 season (and not eligible to play in the provincial 1st division)

=== Group A ===
Pos	Team	Pld	W	D	L	GF	GA	GD	Pts	Qualification or relegation
1	Shahid Molaei Gharakhil	11	9	0	2	22	9	+13	27	Qualification to Second Round
2	Moghavem Fajr Alborz	11	7	2	2	27	8	+19	23	Qualification to Second Round
3	Damash Parseh Tehran	11	5	4	2	14	11	+3	19	
4	Sanat Khorasan	11	6	0	5	21	12	+9	18	
5	Nasle Aboumoslem Mashhad	11	5	3	3	14	10	+4	18	Relegation to Provincial Leagues 2018–19
6	Kaveh Shahrdari Varamin	11	4	3	4	19	11	+8	15	Relegation to Provincial Leagues 2018–19
7	Shahrdari Sari	11	4	3	4	18	14	+4	15	Relegation to Provincial Leagues 2018–19
8	Esteghlal Novin Bojnord	11	4	3	4	12	11	+1	15	Relegation to Provincial Leagues 2018–19
9	Aboumoslem Samen Mashhad	11	4	3	4	16	18	−2	15	Relegation to Provincial Leagues 2018–19
10	Shahid Karimi Tehran	11	3	2	6	15	24	−9	11	Relegation to Provincial Leagues 2018–19
11	Negin Shahvar Shahroud	11	2	2	7	13	25	−12	8	Relegation to Provincial Leagues 2018–19
12	Aria Sepahan Tehran	11	0	1	10	10	48	−38	1	Relegation to Provincial Leagues 2018–19
13	Sanat Sari	0	0	0	0	0	0	0	0	Relegation to Provincial 2nd Division 2018–19

Updated to match(es) played on 15 January 2017. Source:
Rules for classification: 1) points; 2) goal difference; 3) number of goals scored.

=== Group B ===
Pos	Team	Pld	W	D	L	GF	GA	GD	Pts	Qualification or relegation
1	Pas Guilan	10	8	0	2	19	5	+14	24	Qualification to Second Round
2	Aria Minou Khoramdare	10	6	2	2	20	7	+13	20	Qualification to Second Round
3	Moghavemat Alborz	10	6	2	2	17	9	+8	20	
4	Safahan Isfahan	10	5	3	2	17	8	+9	18	
5	Omid Hasan Abad	10	4	4	2	19	16	+3	16	Relegation to Provincial Leagues 2018–19
6	Salavan Ardabil	10	5	1	4	14	15	−1	16	Relegation to Provincial Leagues 2018–19
7	Sahel Orang Chalos	10	4	3	3	16	12	+4	15	Relegation to Provincial Leagues 2018–19
8	Foolad Vision Mahan	10	1	6	3	10	16	−6	9	Relegation to Provincial Leagues 2018–19
9	Bahman Sabz Alborz	10	3	0	7	11	22	−11	9	Relegation to Provincial Leagues 2018–19
10	Setare Ghazvin	10	0	3	7	9	21	−12	3	Relegation to Provincial Leagues 2018–19
11	Omid Soheil Qom	10	0	2	8	8	29	−21	2	Relegation to Provincial Leagues 2018–19
12	Etehad Sari	10	0	2	8	8	29	−21	2	Relegation to Provincial 2nd Division 2018–19
12	Shirin Faraz Tehran	10	0	2	8	8	29	−21	2	Relegation to Provincial 2nd Division 2018–19

Updated to match(es) played on 9 December 2016. Source:
Rules for classification: 1) points; 2) goal difference; 3) number of goals scored.

=== Group C ===
Pos	Team	Pld	W	D	L	GF	GA	GD	Pts	Qualification or relegation
1	Arash Rey	12	9	1	2	29	9	+20	28	Qualification to Second Round
2	Dalahoo Kermanshah	12	8	3	1	28	8	+20	27	Qualification to Second Round
3	Mobl Mohtasham Tabriz	12	7	2	3	30	17	+13	23	
4	Zob Felezat Bahar	12	6	4	2	14	8	+6	22	
5	Bimarestan Pars Tehran	12	5	3	4	20	16	+4	18	Relegation to Provincial Leagues 2018–19
6	Zolfaghar Kashan	12	5	3	4	18	14	+4	18	Relegation to Provincial Leagues 2018–19
7	Azar Yord Shahin Dezh	12	5	3	4	19	22	−3	18	Relegation to Provincial Leagues 2018–19
8	Oghab tehran	12	3	6	3	18	15	+3	15	Relegation to Provincial Leagues 2018–19
9	Abidar Sanandaj	12	4	3	5	14	13	+1	15	Relegation to Provincial Leagues 2018–19
10	Oghab Tabriz	12	4	2	6	19	20	−1	14	Relegation to Provincial Leagues 2018–19
11	Mahdiye Tabriz	12	4	2	6	17	20	−3	14	Relegation to Provincial Leagues 2018–19
12	Pas Saveh	12	1	1	10	8	41	−33	4	Relegation to Provincial Leagues 2018–19
13	Shahrdari Marivan	12	0	1	11	3	34	−31	1	Relegation to Provincial 2nd Division 2018–19

Updated to match(es) played on 15 November 2016. Source:
Rules for classification: 1) points; 2) goal difference; 3) number of goals scored.

=== Group D ===
Pos	Team	Pld	W	D	L	GF	GA	GD	Pts	Qualification or relegation
1	Esteghlal Ramshir	12	7	3	2	21	10	+11	24	Qualification to Second Round
2	Pardis Khoram Abad	12	7	3	2	18	10	+8	24	Qualification to Second Round
3	Sepahan Izeh	12	6	5	1	24	9	+15	23	
4	Sepahan Khourmoj	12	6	3	3	19	8	+11	21	
5	Farhang Ramhormoz	12	5	4	3	21	11	+10	19	Relegation to Provincial Leagues 2018–19
6	Persepolis Boneh Gaz	12	5	4	3	13	10	+3	19	Relegation to Provincial Leagues 2018–19
7	Nasaji Boroujerd	12	5	2	5	16	15	+1	17	Relegation to Provincial Leagues 2018–19
8	Foolad Yasooj	12	5	2	5	18	19	−1	17	Relegation to Provincial Leagues 2018–19
9	Esteghlal Boneh Gaz	12	4	3	5	15	13	+2	15	Relegation to Provincial Leagues 2018–19
10	Esteghlal Ramhormoz	12	3	3	6	18	20	−2	12	Relegation to Provincial Leagues 2018–19
11	Payam Choghadak Boushehr	12	2	5	5	10	19	−9	11	Relegation to Provincial Leagues 2018–19
12	Mehregan Ilam	12	3	0	9	11	34	−23	9	Relegation to Provincial Leagues 2018–19
13	Shahed Poldokhtar	12	1	1	10	8	34	−26	4	Relegation to Provincial 2nd Division 2018–19

Updated to match(es) played on 9 December 2017. Source:
Rules for classification: 1) points; 2) goal difference; 3) number of goals scored.

=== Group E ===
Pos	Team	Pld	W	D	L	GF	GA	GD	Pts	Qualification or relegation
1	Jahad Nasr Sirjan	11	6	4	1	18	6	+12	22	Qualification to Second Round
2	Shahid Rezaei Firouzabad	11	6	4	1	14	5	+9	22	Qualification to Second Round
3	Foolad Bardsir	11	7	1	3	13	10	+3	22	
4	Setaregan Bestano	11	5	5	1	16	7	+9	20	
5	Shahid Bagheri Gouyam	11	5	5	1	13	5	+8	20	Relegation to Provincial Leagues 2018–19
6	Khalij Fars Minab	11	5	2	4	14	12	+2	17	Relegation to Provincial Leagues 2018–19
7	Shahrdari Manojan	11	4	4	3	14	10	+4	16	Relegation to Provincial Leagues 2018–19
8	Sang Ahan Bafgh	11	4	1	6	12	12	0	13	Relegation to Provincial Leagues 2018–19
9	Oghab Shiraz	11	2	3	6	10	14	−4	9	Relegation to Provincial Leagues 2018–19
10	Shahin Zahedan	11	1	3	7	6	17	−11	6	Relegation to Provincial Leagues 2018–19
11	Pishgaman Birjand	11	1	3	7	9	25	−16	6	Relegation to Provincial Leagues 2018–19
12	Tose'e Zagros Kish	11	1	3	7	8	24	−16	6	Relegation to Provincial 2nd Division 2018–19
13	Hafari Sepidan Kish	0	0	0	0	0	0	0	0	Relegation to Provincial 2nd Division 2018–19

Updated to match(es) played on 9 December 2017. Source:
Rules for classification: 1) points; 2) goal difference; 3) number of goals scored.

== Second round ==
Second Round will be started after first round (December 2017)

Promotion and Relegation:

First team of each group (total: 3 teams) will promote to second division.

Teams ranked 2 in each group and the best 3rd place team, will promote to playoff round.

In playoff round, two teams of four, will play against each other and winners will play another match. The winner of last match will promote to second division. (Totally 4 teams will promote)

Playoff losers (3 teams), other 3rd ranked teams who did not qualify to playoff round (2 teams), and teams ranked 4th and 5th (total: 11 teams) will play in second round of next season.

Teams ranked 7th or below (15 teams) will play in first round of next season.

Each team who give up in 2 matches, will be relegated 2 divisions for next season. Therefore, in this stage, the teams which gave up 2 matches, will be eligible to play in the provincial 1st division for 2018–19 season (and not eligible to play in the 1st stage of 3rd division)

=== Group A (North) ===
Pos	Team	Pld	W	D	L	GF	GA	GD	Pts	Promotion or qualification
1	Chooka Talesh	18	9	6	3	24	17	+7	33	Promotion to 2nd Division 2018–19
2	Entezar Bojnourd	18	8	7	3	31	19	+12	31	3rd Division 2017-18 Play Off
3	Shahid Molaei Gharakhil	18	9	4	5	22	16	+6	31	Second Round - 3rd Division 2018-19
4	Parag Tehran	18	8	6	4	27	12	+15	30	Second Round - 3rd Division 2018-19
5	Pas Gilan	18	8	4	6	24	21	+3	28	Second Round - 3rd Division 2018-19
6	Hirkani Chalous	18	7	6	5	18	22	−4	27	First Round - 3rd Division 2018-19
7	Shahrdari Noshahr	18	7	5	6	20	21	−1	26	First Round - 3rd Division 2018-19
8	Moghavem Fajr Alborz	18	5	4	9	20	25	−5	19	First Round - 3rd Division 2018-19
9	Shohadaye Makeran Miandoroud	18	5	4	9	21	31	−10	19	First Round - 3rd Division 2018-19
10	Arash Rey	18	1	0	17	21	44	−23	3	First Round - 3rd Division 2018-19

Updated to match(es) played on 02 May 2018. Source:
Rules for classification: 1) points; 2) goal difference; 3) number of goals scored.

=== Group B (Center & East ) ===
Pos	Team	Pld	W	D	L	GF	GA	GD	Pts	Promotion or qualification
1	Shahrdari Kamyaran	16	10	4	2	22	5	+17	34	Promotion to 2nd Division 2017–18
2	Shohadaye Razakan Karaj	16	7	6	3	30	23	+7	27	3rd Division 2017-18 Play Off
3	Shahrdari Ardabil F.C.	16	6	7	3	29	22	+7	25	Second Round - 3rd Division 2018-19
4	Kian Tehran	16	6	5	5	24	21	+3	23	Second Round - 3rd Division 2018-19
5	Spidar Tehran	16	6	4	6	22	23	−1	22	Second Round - 3rd Division 2018-19
6	Pardis Khoramabad	16	5	5	6	17	18	−1	20	First Round - 3rd Division 2018-19
7	Arya Minoo Khoramdareh	16	5	2	9	14	29	−15	17	First Round - 3rd Division 2018-19
8	Dalahou Kermanshah	16	3	5	8	16	22	−6	14	First Round - 3rd Division 2018-19
9	Omid Hasanabad	16	4	2	10	19	30	−11	14	First Round - 3rd Division 2018-19
10	Shahrdari Arak	0	0	0	0	0	0	0	0	First Round - 3rd Division 2018-19

Updated to match(es) played on 2 May 2018. Source:
Rules for classification: 1) points; 2) goal difference; 3) number of goals scored.

=== Group C (South) ===
Pos	Team	Pld	W	D	L	GF	GA	GD	Pts	Promotion or qualification
1	Esteghlall Ramshir	18	10	6	2	30	10	+20	36	Promotion to 2nd Division 2018–19
2	Jahad Nasr Sirjan	18	9	4	5	25	20	+5	31	3rd Division 2017-18 Play Off
3	Hafari Ahvaz	18	9	3	6	29	18	+11	30	Second Round - 3rd Division 2018-19
4	Sepahan Izeh	18	8	6	4	20	14	+6	30	Second Round - 3rd Division 2018-19
5	Pirouzi Borazjan	18	7	4	7	20	17	+3	25	Second Round - 3rd Division 2018-19
6	Shahid Bagheri Gouyom	18	7	1	10	17	29	−12	22	First Round - 3rd Division 2018-19
7	Jondishapour Dezfoul	18	4	8	6	18	18	0	20	First Round - 3rd Division 2018-19
8	Gameroon Hormozgan	18	5	5	8	16	21	−5	20	First Round - 3rd Division 2018-19
9	Perspolis Genaveh	18	3	7	8	12	25	−13	16	First Round - 3rd Division 2018-19
10	Jonoub Baghmalek	18	4	4	10	17	32	−15	16	First Round - 3rd Division 2018-19

Updated to match(es) played on 2 May 2018. Source:
Rules for classification: 1) points; 2) goal difference; 3) number of goals scored.

=== Ranking of 3rd Placed Teams ===
Pos	Team	Pld	W	D	L	GF	GA	GD	Pts	Qualification
1	Shahid Molaei Gharakhil	16	8	4	4	20	13	+7	28	3rd Division 2017-18 Play Off
2	Hafari Ahvaz	16	8	3	5	24	15	+9	27	Second Round - 3rd Division 2018-19
3	Shahrdari Ardabil F.C.	16	6	7	3	29	22	+7	25	Second Round - 3rd Division 2018-19

Updated to match(es) played on 2 May 2018. Source:
Rules for classification: 1) points; 2) goal difference; 3) number of goals scored.

== Play-off ==
=== First round ===
Team 1	Score	Team 2	1st leg	2nd leg	Notes
Entezar Bojnourd	2-2	Jahad Nasr Sirjan	2-1	0-1	Jahad Nasr Sirjan won on away goals
Shohadaye Razakan Karaj	2-2	Shahid Molayi Gharakhil	1-2	1-0	Shahid Molayi Gharakhil won on away goals

=== Second round ===
Team 1	Score	Team 2	1st leg	2nd leg	Notes
Jahad Nasr Sirjan	1-0	Shahid Molayi Gharakhil	1-0	0-0	

The winner will be promoted to 2018–19 Iran Football's 2nd Division.
