= 2018–19 Iran Football's 3rd Division =

Artist

Iran Football's 3rd Division
- Season: 2018–19
- Champions: Shahedari Astara (Group A); Melli Haffari Ahvaz (Group B); Esteghlal Molasani (Group C)
- Promoted: Shahedari Astara; Milad Mehr Iranian; Melli Haffari Ahvaz; Darayi Gaz; Esteghlal Molasani; Shohadaye Razakan Karaj
- Biggest home win: Esteghlal Shoush 9-0 Green Keshavarz Nahavand
- Biggest away win: Parvaz Zanjan 0-6 Shahrdari Noshahr; Yaran Rahimi Shahre Rey 0-6 Shahrdari Astara

The article contains information about the 2018–19 Iran 3rd Division football season. This is the 4th rated football league in Iran after the Persian Gulf Cup, Azadegan League, and 2nd Division. The league started from October 2018.

In total and in the first round, 65 teams will compete in 5 different groups.

== First round ==
Each team who give up in 2 matches, will be relegated 2 divisions for next season. Therefore, in this stage, the teams which give up 2 matches, will be eligible to play in the provincial 2nd division for 2019–20 season (and not eligible to play in the provincial 1st division)

=== Group A ===
Pos	Team	Pld	W	D	L	GF	GA	GD	Pts	Qualification or relegation
1	Darayi Bandar Gaz (A)	12	7	3	2	12	7	+5	24	Promotion to Second Round
2	Shahrdari Fereydoon Kenar (A)	12	6	4	2	19	12	+7	22	Promotion to Second Round
3	Alton Tehran	12	6	3	3	22	9	+13	21	
4	Moghavemat Novin Tehran	12	6	3	3	15	9	+6	21	
5	Caspian Babol	12	6	2	4	17	10	+7	20	
6	Moghavemat Alborz (R)	12	6	2	4	14	13	+1	20	Relegation to Provincial Leagues 2018–19
7	Shahrdari Birjand (R)	12	5	4	3	16	15	+1	19	Relegation to Provincial Leagues 2018–19
8	Sanat Mashhad (R)	11	3	5	3	13	14	−1	14	Relegation to Provincial Leagues 2018–19
9	Arya Sangsar Semnan (R)	11	4	2	5	11	13	−2	14	Relegation to Provincial Leagues 2018–19
10	Shah Jahan Esfarayen (R)	12	4	2	6	12	18	−6	14	Relegation to Provincial Leagues 2018–19
11	Omid Hasan Abad Tehran (R)	11	4	1	6	13	15	−2	13	Relegation to Provincial Leagues 2018–19
12	Zob Azarakhsh Mashhad (R)	11	1	2	8	8	18	−10	5	Relegation to Provincial Leagues 2018–19
13	Pas Mashhad (R)	12	1	1	10	6	25	−19	4	Relegation to Provincial Leagues 2018–19

Updated to match(es) played on 15 December 2018. Source: Dsport
Rules for classification: 1) points; 2) goal difference; 3) number of goals scored.
(A) Advance to a further round; (R) Relegated

=== Group B ===
Pos	Team	Pld	W	D	L	GF	GA	GD	Pts	Qualification or relegation
1	Shahrdari Astara (A)	12	10	2	0	31	5	+26	32	Promotion to Second Round
2	Shahrdari Noshahr (A)	12	8	2	2	28	8	+20	26	Promotion to Second Round
3	Shohadaye Makeran Miandoroud	12	7	4	1	16	5	+11	25	
4	Moghavem Fajr Alborz	12	7	3	2	19	13	+6	24	
5	Azar Kosar Tabriz	12	7	1	4	19	8	+11	22	
6	Sepehr Sabz Azarbaijan (R)	12	7	1	4	23	14	+9	22	Relegation to Provincial Leagues 2019–20
7	Safir Novin Abyek Novin Abyek (R)	12	6	3	3	21	11	+10	21	Relegation to Provincial Leagues 2019–20
8	Damash Tehran (R)	12	5	0	7	21	19	+2	15	Relegation to Provincial Leagues 2019–20
9	Arash Rey (R)	12	4	1	7	17	18	−1	13	Relegation to Provincial Leagues 2019–20
10	Yaran Sheikh Rahimi Shahr Rey (R)	12	2	3	7	15	25	−10	9	Relegation to Provincial Leagues 2019–20
11	Arya Minoo Khoramdareh (R)	12	2	2	8	16	30	−14	8	Relegation to Provincial Leagues 2019–20
12	Garmi Ardabil (R)	12	1	2	9	8	39	−31	5	Relegation to Provincial Leagues 2019–20
13	Parvaz Zanjan (R)	12	0	0	12	6	45	−39	0	Relegation to Provincial Leagues 2019–20

Updated to match(es) played on 15 December 2018. Source: Dsport
Rules for classification: 1) points; 2) goal difference; 3) number of goals scored.
(A) Advance to a further round; (R) Relegated

=== Group C ===
Pos	Team	Pld	W	D	L	GF	GA	GD	Pts	Qualification or relegation
1	Esteghlal Shoosh (A)	11	9	1	1	28	6	+22	28	Promotion to Second Round
2	Esteghlal Molasani (A)	10	7	2	1	24	7	+17	23	Promotion to Second Round
3	Zob Felezat Bahar Hamedan	11	7	2	2	24	9	+15	23	
4	Soldouz Naghadeh	11	6	2	3	22	14	+8	20	
5	Kavian Naghadeh	11	6	2	3	14	10	+4	20	
6	Perspolis Dezfool (R)	9	4	2	3	11	8	+3	14	Relegation to Provincial Leagues 2019–20
7	Green Keshavarz Nahavand (R)	11	3	4	4	20	26	−6	13	Relegation to Provincial Leagues 2019–20
8	Shahab Tehran (R)	11	2	4	5	10	19	−9	10	Relegation to Provincial Leagues 2019–20
9	Tarbiat Saghez (R)	10	2	4	4	7	18	−11	10	Relegation to Provincial Leagues 2019–20
10	Ghorveh Kordestan (R)	11	0	5	6	7	21	−14	5	Relegation to Provincial Leagues 2019–20
11	Shahid Kalhor Shahriar (R)	11	1	2	8	9	26	−17	5	Relegation to Provincial Leagues 2019–20
12	Shahid Kazemi Alborz (R)	11	0	4	7	7	19	−12	4	Relegation to Provincial Leagues 2019–20
13	Kimia Farayand Tehran (E)	0	0	0	0	0	0	0	0	Relegation to Provincial 2nd Division 2019–20

Updated to match(es) played on 15 December 2018. Source: Dsport
Rules for classification: 1) points; 2) goal difference; 3) number of goals scored.
(A) Advance to a further round; (E) Eliminated; (R) Relegated

=== Group D ===
Pos	Team	Pld	W	D	L	GF	GA	GD	Pts	Qualification or relegation
1	Mansoor Saveh (A)	9	6	2	1	14	7	+7	20	Promotion to Second Round
2	Behzisti Lorestan (A)	9	5	3	1	16	10	+6	18	Promotion to Second Round
3	Shahin Bandar Ameri Booshehr	9	5	2	2	18	10	+8	17	
4	Esteghlal Mahshahr	9	4	2	3	14	9	+5	14	
5	Moasseseye Denaye Yasooj	9	4	1	4	12	7	+5	13	
6	Shohadaye Chovar 65 Ilam (R)	9	4	0	5	15	14	+1	12	Relegation to Provincial Leagues 2019–20
7	Sepahan Khoormooj (R)	9	4	0	5	10	14	−4	12	Relegation to Provincial Leagues 2019–20
8	Aboozar Basht (R)	9	3	2	4	9	11	−2	11	Relegation to Provincial Leagues 2019–20
9	Jonoob Baghmalek (R)	9	3	1	5	13	13	0	10	Relegation to Provincial Leagues 2019–20
10	Shahin Lordegan (R)	9	0	1	8	5	31	−26	1	Relegation to Provincial Leagues 2019–20
11	Pespolis Ganaveh (E)	0	0	0	0	0	0	0	0	Relegation to Provincial 2nd Division 2019–20
11	Dalahou Kermanshah (E)	0	0	0	0	0	0	0	0	Relegation to Provincial 2nd Division 2019–20
11	Dalahou Karand Gharb (E)	0	0	0	0	0	0	0	0	Relegation to Provincial 2nd Division 2019–20

Updated to match(es) played on 15 December 2018. Source: Dsport
Rules for classification: 1) points; 2) goal difference; 3) number of goals scored.
(A) Advance to a further round; (E) Eliminated; (R) Relegated

=== Group E ===
Pos	Team	Pld	W	D	L	GF	GA	GD	Pts	Qualification or relegation
1	Aran o Bidgol Isfahan (A)	10	6	3	1	19	6	+13	21	Promotion to Second Round
2	Zolfaghar Kashan (A)	10	5	5	0	21	6	+15	20	Promotion to Second Round
3	Khalij Fars Minab Hormozgan	10	5	4	1	19	7	+12	19	
4	Faroogh Marvdasht	10	4	3	3	8	10	−2	15	
5	Foolad Bardsir Kerman	10	4	2	4	11	8	+3	14	
6	Esteghlal Latifi Larestan (R)	10	4	2	4	8	14	−6	14	Relegation to Provincial Leagues 2019–20
7	Shohadaye Bafgh Yazd (R)	10	2	5	3	11	11	0	11	Relegation to Provincial Leagues 2019–20
8	Kishvand Javan (R)	10	3	2	5	14	20	−6	11	Relegation to Provincial Leagues 2019–20
9	Kerman (R)	10	2	4	4	8	10	−2	10	Relegation to Provincial Leagues 2019–20
10	Vahdat Zahedan (R)	10	2	1	7	8	22	−14	7	Relegation to Provincial Leagues 2019–20
11	Shohadaye Kooshk Bidak Shiraz (R)	10	1	3	6	3	16	−13	6	Relegation to Provincial Leagues 2019–20
12	Aluminium Hormozgan (E)	0	0	0	0	0	0	0	0	Relegation to Provincial 2nd Division 2019–20
12	Foolad Yazd (E)	0	0	0	0	0	0	0	0	Relegation to Provincial 2nd Division 2019–20

Updated to match(es) played on 15 December 2018. Source: Dsport
Rules for classification: 1) points; 2) goal difference; 3) number of goals scored.
(A) Advance to a further round; (E) Eliminated; (R) Relegated

== Second round ==
Second Round will be started after first round (December 2018)

Promotion and Relegation:

Teams rankes first and second in each group (Total 6 teams) will promote to 2nd Division.

Teams ranked 9th and 10th in each group and the 2 worst 8th ranked teams (Total 8 teams) will be relegated to 1st round of 3rd Dicivion.

Each team who give up in 2 matches, will be relegated 2 divisions for next season. Therefore, in this stage, the teams which gave up 2 matches, will be eligible to play in the provincial 1st division for 2019–20 season (and not eligible to play in the 1st stage of 3rd division as a lower Division)

=== Group 1 ===
Pos	Team	Pld	W	D	L	GF	GA	GD	Pts	Promotion or relegation
1	Shahrdari Astara (P)	18	11	4	3	25	18	+7	37	Promotion to 2019-20 Iran Football's 2nd Division
2	Milad Mehr Tehran (P)	18	9	4	5	25	18	+7	31	Promotion to 2019-20 Iran Football's 2nd Division
3	Shahrdari Noshahr	18	8	5	5	26	19	+7	29	
4	Pas Gilan	18	7	6	5	18	17	+1	27	
5	Tazan Tehran	18	7	5	6	23	18	+5	26	
6	Shahid Molayi	18	7	5	6	19	16	+3	26	
7	Shahrdari Ardabil	18	5	7	6	23	24	−1	22	
8	Aran o Bidgol Isfahan (R)	18	5	6	7	21	26	−5	21	Relegation to 3rd Division - 1st Stage 2019–20
9	Shahrdari Ferydoonkenar (R)	18	5	0	13	21	35	−14	15	Relegation to 3rd Division - 1st Stage 2019–20
10	Mokerian Mahabad (R)	18	2	6	10	18	28	−10	12	Relegation to 3rd Division - 1st Stage 2019–20

Updated to match(es) played on 2 May 2019. Source: Dsport
Rules for classification: 1) points; 2) goal difference; 3) number of goals scored.
(P) Promoted; (R) Relegated

=== Group 2 ===
Pos	Team	Pld	W	D	L	GF	GA	GD	Pts	Promotion or relegation
1	Melli Haffari Ahvaz (P)	18	10	8	0	24	6	+18	38	Promotion to 2019-20 Iran Football's 2nd Division
2	Darayi Gaz (P)	18	11	4	3	26	20	+6	37	Promotion to 2019-20 Iran Football's 2nd Division
3	Vista Toorbin Tehran	18	11	3	4	35	12	+23	36	
4	Esteghlal Shoosh	18	10	6	2	32	16	+16	36	
5	Zolfaghar Kashan	18	8	7	3	29	19	+10	31	
6	Setareh Sorkh Kashan	18	4	6	8	18	19	−1	18	
7	Shahid Karimi Mazandaran	18	4	3	11	16	32	−16	15	
8	Naft Iranian Tehran (R)	18	2	6	10	16	35	−19	12	Relegation to 3rd Division - 1st Stage 2019–20
9	Arya Sangsar Semnan (E)	18	3	3	12	11	31	−20	12	Relegation to Provincial League 2019–20
10	Hirkani Chaloos (R)	18	1	6	11	11	28	−17	9	Relegation to 3rd Division - 1st Stage 2019–20

Updated to match(es) played on 2 May 2019. Source: Dsport
Rules for classification: 1) points; 2) goal difference; 3) number of goals scored.
(E) Eliminated; (P) Promoted; (R) Relegated

=== Group 3 ===
Pos	Team	Pld	W	D	L	GF	GA	GD	Pts	Promotion or relegation
1	Esteghlal Molasani (P)	17	10	5	2	28	15	+13	35	Promotion to 2019-20 Iran Football's 2nd Division
2	Shohadaye Razakan Karaj (P)	18	10	5	3	27	15	+12	35	Promotion to 2019-20 Iran Football's 2nd Division
3	Kian Tehran	18	8	6	4	32	18	+14	30	
4	Sepahan Novin Isfahan	17	7	6	4	26	21	+5	27	
5	Sina San'at Izeh	18	7	5	6	26	22	+4	26	
6	Pouyandegan Talash Marvdasht	18	6	8	4	25	23	+2	26	
7	Vahdat Padideh Boushehr	18	7	3	8	20	14	+6	24	
8	Parag Tehran	18	5	7	6	32	24	+8	22	
9	Behin Batis Isfahan (R)	18	2	3	13	21	47	−26	9	Relegation to 3rd Division - 1st Stage 2019–20
10	Mansour Saveh (E)	18	2	2	14	8	46	−38	8	Relegation Privincal League 2019–20

Updated to match(es) played on 28 April 2019. Source: Dsport
Rules for classification: 1) points; 2) goal difference; 3) number of goals scored.
(E) Eliminated; (P) Promoted; (R) Relegated
