= 2019–20 Iran Football's 3rd Division =

Iran Football's 3rd Division
- Season: 2019–20
- Champions: Vista Toorbin Tehran (Group 1) Mohtasham Tabriz (Group 2) Shahin Bandar Ameri (Group 3)
- Promoted: Vista Toorbin Tehran, Mohtasham Tabriz, Shahin Bandar Ameri, Oghab Tehran
- Biggest home win: Shahid Oraki Eslamshahr 10-1 Talayedaran Boein Zahra
- Biggest away win: Mokerian Mahabad 0-11 Oghab Tehran; Moghadasi Kish 0-11 Sanat Foolad Isfahan

The article contains information about the 2019–20 Iran 3rd Division football season. This is the 4th rated football league in Iran after the Persian Gulf Cup, Azadegan League, and 2nd Division. The league started from 3 September 2019.

In total 85 teams (65 teams in the first round in 5 groups, 20 teams in second round) were planned to compete in this season's competitions.

After concerns about COVID-19 pandemic in Iran the matches has been postponed at 1 March 2020 while six weeks of the Second Round and the Play-off matches was remained. The season continued from 30 July 2020.

== First round ==
Each team who lose 2 matches, will be relegated 2 divisions for next season. Therefore, in this stage, the teams which lose 2 matches, will be eligible to play in the provincial 2nd division for 2020–21 season (and not eligible to play in the provincial 1st division)
The top 2 teams from each group and two best 3rd placed teams (total 12 teams) will advance to the Second Round. 3 worth ranked 3ed teams and the teams ranked 4th and 5th in each group and 2 best 6th placed teams (total 15 teams) will be eligible to play in the First Round of next season. 3 worth ranked 6th teams and the teams ranked 7th and lower will be relegated to Provincial Leagues. However all the three worst 6th placed team, remained and not relegated, due to direct relegation of higher-level league to Privincal leagues instead of 3rd Division - 1st Stage (This level).

=== Qualified teams ===
Teams which are eligible to play in this round are as follows:

Relegated from 2nd Division (2 Teams):

- Rah Ahan Tehran (Replaced by Arian Andishe Tehran)
- Saba Qom (Replaced by Darya Harabdeh Mahmoudabad)

Relegated from 3rd Division – 2nd Stage (6 Teams):

- Aran o Bidgol Isfahan (Replaced by Sepid Dasht Shahreza)
- Naft Iranian Tehran
- Shahrdari Ferydoonkenar
- Behin Batis Isfahan (Replaced by Rezvani Isfahan)
- Mokerian Mahabad
- Hirkani Chaloos (Replaced by Damavand Amol)

Remaining from 3rd Division – 1st Stage (17 Teams):

- Alton Tehran (Replaced by Kimia Tehran)
- Shahin Bandar Ameri
- Moghavem Fajr Alborz (Replaced by Bargh Ara Alborz)
- Faroogh Marvdasht (Replaced by Behzisti Lorestan)
- Kavian Naghadeh
- Sepehr Sabz Azarbaijan (Replaced by Sorkhpooshan Tabriz)
- Shohadaye Makeran Miandoroud (Replaced by Darya Babol)
- Khalij Fars Minab
- Soldouz Naghadeh
- Caspian Babol
- Moasseseye Denaye Yasooj
- Perspolis Dezfool
- Zob Felezat Bahar Hamedan
- Moghavemat Novin Tehran
- Esteghlal Mahshahr
- Azar Kosar Tabriz
- Foolad Bardsir Kerman (Replaced by Daneshgah Oloum Pezeshki Kerman)

Promoted from Provincial Leagues (34 Teams):

- Farhang Alborz (Alborz)
- Mi'ad Moghan Parsabad (Replaced by Nokhbegan Mehr Ardabil) (Ardebil)
- Keshavarz Boukan (Azarbayejan Gharbi)
- Hermas Fateh Shiran Tabriz (Azarbayejan Sharghi)
- Esteghlal Boneh Gaz(Replaced by Abipoushan Boneh Gaz) (Boushehr)
- Roz Mooket Boroujen (Chaharmahal & Bakhtiyari)
- Omid Beton Nourabad (Fars)
- Moghavemat (Farhan Isar) Astara (Gilan)
- Steel Alborz Agh-Ghala (Golestan)
- Talar Vahdat Marianj (Replaced by Shahrdari Marianj) (Hamedan)
- Foolad Hormozgan (Hormozgan)
- Kosar Mehran (Ilam)
- Sanat Foolad Isfahan (Isfahan)
- Shahrdari Menojan (Kerman)
- Gholami Kermanshah (Kermanshah) (Replaced by Oghab Shiraz)
- 04 Birjand (Khorasan Jonoubi)
- Mohajer Novin Mashhad (Khorasan Razavi)
- Oghab Ashkhane (Replaced by Payam Entezar Ashkhane) (Khorasan Shomali)
- Eftekhar Sherafat Shooshtar (Khouzestan)
- Moghadasi Kish (Kish)
- Tamoradi Kogguilouye (Kohgiluye & Boyer Ahmad)
- Abidar Sanandaj (Kordestan)
- Olampik Doroud (Lorestan)
- Azarab Arak (Markazi)
- Shahrvand Ramsar (Mazandaran)
- Talayedaran Boein Zahra (Qazvin)
- Sorkhpooshan Bam Qom (Qom)
- Payam Sorkhe Semnan (Semnan)
- Oghab Zahedan (Replaced by Bahou Dashtyari Chabahar) (Sistan & Balouchestan)
- Oghab Tehran (Tehran)
- Aryo Najm Tehran (Tehran's runner-up)
- Shahid Oraki Eslamshahr (Tehran Suburbs)
- Yazd Looleh (Yazd)
- Shahab Zanjan (Zanjan)

Free slots (6 teams):

- Ghaffari Qazvin
- Shohadaye Sari
- Shahin Farabord Zanjan
- Shahin Kosar Ardabil
- Kashkan Roud Poldokhtar
- Sepahan Khoormooj

=== Group A ===
Pos	Team	Pld	W	D	L	GF	GA	GD	Pts	Qualification or relegation
1	Moghavemat Novin Tehran	12	8	2	2	23	12	+11	26	Promotion to Second Round
2	Mohajer Novin Mashhad	12	8	1	3	22	11	+11	25	Promotion to Second Round
3	Naft Iranian	12	8	0	4	28	16	+12	24	
4	Shahrdari Fereydoonkenar	12	6	4	2	25	16	+9	22	
5	Darya Harabdeh Mahmoudabad	12	7	1	4	21	13	+8	22	
6	Darya Babol	12	6	2	4	20	13	+7	20	
7	Payam Sorkhe Semnan	12	5	3	4	18	20	−2	18	Relegation to Provincial Leagues 2020–21
8	Shohadaye Sari	11	4	4	3	15	12	+3	16	Relegation to Provincial Leagues 2020–21
9	Ghaffari Qazvin	12	4	3	5	17	15	+2	15	Relegation to Provincial Leagues 2020–21
10	Aryan Andishe Tehran	12	2	3	7	15	27	−12	9	Relegation to Provincial Leagues 2020–21
11	Sorkhpooshan Bam Qom	12	2	2	8	10	28	−18	8	Relegation to Provincial Leagues 2020–21
12	Payam Entezar Ashkhane	12	2	1	9	12	27	−15	7	Relegation to Provincial Leagues 2020–21
13	Steel Alborz Agh-Ghala	11	1	2	8	15	27	−12	5	Relegation to Provincial Leagues 2020–21

Updated to match(es) played on 2 December 2019. Source:
Rules for classification: 1) points; 2) goal difference; 3) number of goals scored.

=== Group B ===
Pos	Team	Pld	W	D	L	GF	GA	GD	Pts	Qualification or relegation
1	Azarab Arak	12	7	4	1	19	5	+14	25	Promotion to Second Round
2	Damavand Amol	12	6	4	2	32	11	+21	22	Promotion to Second Round
3	Farhang Alborz	12	6	3	3	23	13	+10	21	
4	Setareh Kaspian Babol	12	5	6	1	19	16	+3	21	
5	Bargh Ara Alborz	12	4	8	0	16	8	+8	20	
6	Shahrvand Ramsar	12	5	3	4	24	16	+8	18	Remained in 3rd Division - 1st Stage 2020–21 after relegation
7	Soldouz Naghadeh	12	4	5	3	15	11	+4	17	Relegation to Provincial Leagues 2020–21
8	Abidar Sanandaj	12	4	5	3	16	14	+2	17	Relegation to Provincial Leagues 2020–21
9	Shahrdari Marianj Hamedan	12	4	4	4	19	18	+1	16	Relegation to Provincial Leagues 2020–21
10	Kimia Tehran	12	3	4	5	19	18	+1	13	Relegation to Provincial Leagues 2020–21
11	Aryo Najm Tehran	12	2	2	8	12	36	−24	8	Relegation to Provincial Leagues 2020–21
12	Zob Felezat Hamedan	12	1	2	9	10	27	−17	5	Relegation to Provincial Leagues 2020–21
13	Shahin Farabord Zanjan	12	1	2	9	13	44	−31	5	Relegation to Provincial Leagues 2020–21

Updated to match(es) played on 13 November 2019. Source:
Rules for classification: 1) points; 2) goal difference; 3) number of goals scored.

=== Group C ===
Pos	Team	Pld	W	D	L	GF	GA	GD	Pts	Qualification or relegation
1	Oghab Tehran	12	9	1	2	30	9	+21	28	Promotion to Second Round
2	Azar Kosar Tabriz	12	8	3	1	29	11	+18	27	Promotion to Second Round
3	Moghavemat Astara	12	8	2	2	33	14	+19	26	Promotion to Second Round
4	Shahid Oraki Eslamshahr	12	7	2	3	35	12	+23	23	
5	Kavian Naghadeh	12	6	1	5	18	17	+1	19	
6	Hermas Fateh Shiran Tabriz	12	6	1	5	17	16	+1	19	Remained in 3rd Division - 1st Stage 2020–21 after relegation
7	Shahab Zanjan	12	5	3	4	20	17	+3	18	Relegation to Provincial Leagues 2020–21
8	Sorkhpooshan Tabriz	12	4	3	5	22	16	+6	15	Relegation to Provincial Leagues 2020–21
9	Keshavarz Boukan	12	4	2	6	13	17	−4	14	Relegation to Provincial Leagues 2020–21
10	Talayedaran Boein Zahra	12	2	3	7	12	33	−21	9	Relegation to Provincial Leagues 2020–21
11	Nokhbegan Mehr Ardabil	12	3	0	9	9	31	−22	9	Relegation to Provincial Leagues 2020–21
12	Mokerian Mahabad	12	2	2	8	12	37	−25	8	Relegation to Provincial Leagues 2020–21
13	Shahin Kosar Ardabil	12	2	1	9	9	29	−20	7	Relegation to Provincial Leagues 2020–21

Updated to match(es) played on 13 November 2019. Source:
Rules for classification: 1) points; 2) goal difference; 3) number of goals scored.

=== Group D ===
Pos	Team	Pld	W	D	L	GF	GA	GD	Pts	Qualification or relegation
1	Shahin Bandar Ameri	12	9	2	1	23	9	+14	29	Promotion to Second Round
2	Boyer Ahmad Yasouj	12	6	3	3	15	13	+2	21	Promotion to Second Round
3	Perspolis Dezfoul	12	6	2	4	24	13	+11	20	
4	Oghab Shiraz	12	5	4	3	17	13	+4	19	
5	Abipoushan Boneh Gaz	12	5	2	5	14	15	−1	17	
6	Roz Mooket Boroujen	12	4	2	6	13	19	−6	14	Remained in 3rd Division - 1st Stage 2020–21 after relegation
7	Eftekhar Sherafat Shooshtar	12	4	2	6	14	22	−8	14	Relegation to Provincial Leagues 2020–21
8	Esteghlal Mahshahr	12	3	4	5	18	20	−2	13	Relegation to Provincial Leagues 2020–21
9	Olampik Doroud	12	3	3	6	13	18	−5	12	Relegation to Provincial Leagues 2020–21
10	Kosar Mehran	12	3	3	6	20	28	−8	12	Relegation to Provincial Leagues 2020–21
11	Behzisti Lorestan	12	3	2	7	8	16	−8	11	Relegation to Provincial Leagues 2020–21
12	Kashkan Roud Poldokhtar	12	2	3	7	12	17	−5	9	Relegation to Provincial Leagues 2020–21
13	Tamoradi Kogguilouye	12	7	4	1	18	6	+12	25	Relegation to Provincial 2nd Division 2020–21 (Withdrew after 1st stage)

Updated to match(es) played on 3 December 2019. Source:
Rules for classification: 1) points; 2) goal difference; 3) number of goals scored.

=== Group E ===
Pos	Team	Pld	W	D	L	GF	GA	GD	Pts	Qualification or relegation
1	Khalij Fars Minab	12	8	3	1	17	4	+13	27	Promotion to Second Round
2	04 Birjand	12	8	1	3	26	11	+15	25	Promotion to Second Round
3	Yazd Looleh	12	7	4	1	19	8	+11	25	Promotion to Second Round
4	Foolad Hormozgan	12	6	4	2	16	10	+6	22	
5	Sanat Foolad Isfahan	11	6	2	3	19	16	+3	20	
6	Rezvani Isfahan	12	5	4	3	19	16	+3	19	
7	Sepahan Khoormooj	12	5	2	5	14	11	+3	17	Relegation to Provincial Leagues 2020–21
8	Daneshgah Oloum Pezeshki Kerman	12	5	2	5	13	14	−1	17	Relegation to Provincial Leagues 2020–21
9	Omid Beton Nourabad	11	4	3	4	22	14	+8	15	Relegation to Provincial Leagues 2020–21
10	Shahrdari Menojan	12	4	1	7	16	21	−5	13	Relegation to Provincial Leagues 2020–21
11	Bahou Dashtyari Chabahar	12	2	3	7	16	24	−8	9	Relegation to Provincial Leagues 2020–21
12	Moghadasi Kish	12	1	3	8	5	31	−26	6	Relegation to Provincial 2nd Division 2020–21
13	Sepid Dasht Shahreza	12	0	0	12	1	36	−35	0	Relegation to Provincial 2nd Division 2020–21

Updated to match(es) played on 13 November 2019. Source:
Rules for classification: 1) points; 2) goal difference; 3) number of goals scored.

=== Ranking of third-placed teams ===
Pos	Team	Pld	W	D	L	GF	GA	GD	Pts	Qualification or relegation
1	Moghavemat Astara	12	8	2	2	33	14	+19	26	Promotion to Second Round
2	Yazd Looleh	12	7	4	1	19	8	+11	25	Promotion to Second Round
3	Naft Iranian	12	8	0	4	28	16	+12	24	
4	Farhang Alborz	12	6	3	3	23	13	+10	21	
5	Perspolis Dezfoul	12	6	2	4	24	13	+11	20	

Updated to match(es) played on 30 November 2019. Source:
Rules for classification: 1) points; 2) goal difference; 3) number of goals scored.

=== Ranking of six-placed teams ===
Pos	Team	Pld	W	D	L	GF	GA	GD	Pts	Qualification or relegation
1	Darya Babol	12	6	2	4	20	13	+7	20	
2	Rezvani Isfahan	12	5	4	3	19	16	+3	19	
3	Hermas Fateh Shiran Tabriz	12	6	1	5	17	16	+1	19	Remained in 3rd Division - 1st Stage 2020–21 after relegation
4	Shahrvand Ramsar	12	5	3	4	24	16	+8	18	Remained in 3rd Division - 1st Stage 2020–21 after relegation
5	Roz Mooket Boroujen	12	4	2	6	13	19	−6	14	Remained in 3rd Division - 1st Stage 2020–21 after relegation

Updated to match(es) played on 30 November 2019. Source:
Rules for classification: 1) points; 2) goal difference; 3) number of goals scored.

Hermas Fateh Shiran Tabriz, Shahrvand Ramsar and Roz Mooket Boroujen should have relegated to Provincial Leagues in the next season as the three worst 6th placed teams. But due to direct relegation of Moghavemat Novin Tehran, Azarab Arak and Shahrdari Ardabil from 3rd Division - 2nd Stage to Provincial Leagues (instead of 3rd Division - 1st Stage), they remained in 3rd Division - 1st Stage and not relegated.

== Second round ==
Second Round will be started after first round on 17 December 2019

=== Qualified teams ===
Relegated from 2nd Division (2 Teams):

- Esteghlal Ahvaz
- Javan Novin Sari (Replaced: Mes Shahre Babak)

Relegated from 1st Division (According to Competition Regulations) (2 Teams):

- Naft Tehran (Team is dissolved)
- Siah Jamegan Mashhad (Team is dissolved)

Remaining Teams from last season (16 Teams):

- Shahrdari Noshahr
- PAS Gilan
- Tazan Tehran
- Shahid Molayi Ghaemshahr
- Shahrdari Ardabil
- Vista Toorbin Tehran
- Esteghlal Shoosh
- Parag Tehran
- Zolfaghar Kashan
- Setareh Sorkh Kashan
- Kian Tehran
- Sepahan Novin Isfahan
- Sina Sanat Izeh
- Pouyandegan Talash Marvdasht
- Negin Sanabad Khorasan (Replaced: Vahdat Padideh Boushehr)
- Pishgaman Fonoon Pars

Promoted from 1st Stage (12 Teams):

- Moghavemat Novin Tehran
- Azarab Arak
- Oghab Tehran
- Shahin Bandar Ameri
- Khalij Fars Minab
- Mohajer Novin Mashhad
- Damavand Amol
- Azar Kosar Tabriz
- Boyer Ahmad Yasouj
- 04 Birjand
- Moghavemat Astara
- Yazd Looleh

=== Promotion and Relegation ===
Each group's winner (Total 3 teams) will be promoted to the next season's 2nd Division. Each group's runner-up and the best 3rd placed team among 3 groups (Total 4 teams), will qualify to the Play-off round. In Play-off Round, teams were play two knockout rounds, where the winner will be promoted to the next season's 2nd Division.

Teams ranked 8th, 9th and 10th in each group and the worst 7th-placed team among 3 groups (Total 10 teams) will be relegated to 1st Stage of 3rd Division in next season.

=== Group 1 ===
Pos	Team	Pld	W	D	L	GF	GA	GD	Pts	Promotion or relegation
1	Vista Toorbin Tehran	18	10	5	3	39	13	+26	35	Promotion to 2020-21 Iran Football's 2nd Division
2	Javan Novin Sari	18	10	5	3	23	12	+11	35	Promotion to Play-off
3	Shahrdari Noshahr	18	9	3	6	20	17	+3	30	
4	Parag Tehran	18	8	3	7	21	24	−3	27	
5	Tazan Tehran	18	7	4	7	26	24	+2	25	
6	04 Birjand	18	6	6	6	20	23	−3	24	
7	Mohajer Novin Mashhad	18	4	9	5	19	21	−2	21	
8	Kian Tehran	18	4	6	8	20	25	−5	18	Relegation to 3rd Division - 1st Stage 2020–21
9	Setareh Sorkh Kashan	18	3	6	9	19	31	−12	15	Relegation to 3rd Division - 1st Stage 2020–21
10	Negin Sanabad Khorasan	18	3	5	10	18	35	−17	14	Relegation to 3rd Division - 1st Stage 2020–21

Updated to match(es) played on 2 September 2020. Source:
Rules for classification: 1) points; 2) goal difference; 3) number of goals scored.

=== Group 2 ===
Pos	Team	Pld	W	D	L	GF	GA	GD	Pts	Promotion or relegation
1	Mohtasham Tabriz	18	10	7	1	31	12	+19	37	Promotion to 2020-21 Iran Football's 2nd Division
2	Oghab Tehran	18	8	9	1	30	8	+22	33	Promotion to Play-off
3	PAS Gilan	18	9	6	3	21	10	+11	33	
4	Pishgaman Fonoon Pars	18	6	11	1	23	8	+15	29	
5	Zolfaghar Kashan	18	8	7	3	28	14	+14	31	
6	Shahid Molayi Ghaemshahr	18	6	7	5	22	19	+3	25	
7	Moghavemat Astara	18	4	7	7	25	24	+1	19	Remained in 3rd Division - 2nd Stage 2020–21 after relegation
8	Damavand Amol	18	5	4	9	18	29	−11	19	Relegation to 3rd Division - 1st Stage 2020–21
9	Shahrdari Ardabil	18	3	2	13	12	37	−25	11	Relegation Privincal League 2020–21
10	Moghavemat Novin Tehran	18	1	0	17	2	51	−49	3	Relegation Privincal League 2020–21

Updated to match(es) played on 2 September 2020. Source:
Rules for classification: 1) points; 2) goal difference; 3) number of goals scored.

=== Group 3 ===
Pos	Team	Pld	W	D	L	GF	GA	GD	Pts	Promotion or relegation
1	Shahin Bandar Ameri	16	13	0	3	34	13	+21	39	Promotion to 2020-21 Iran Football's 2nd Division
2	Esteghlal Shoosh	16	9	3	4	28	17	+11	30	Promotion to Play-off
3	Yazd Looleh	16	9	3	4	25	21	+4	30	Promotion to Play-off
4	Sepahan Novin Izeh	16	7	2	7	23	22	+1	23	
5	Bargh 3 Faz Shiraz	16	6	3	7	14	13	+1	21	
6	Boyer Ahmad Yasouj	16	5	5	6	19	20	−1	20	
7	Sepahan Novin Isfahan	16	4	6	6	21	22	−1	18	
8	Khalij Fars Minab	16	5	2	9	14	22	−8	17	Relegation to 3rd Division - 1st Stage 2020–21
9	Azarab Arak	16	1	2	13	5	33	−28	5	Relegation Privincal League 2020–21
10	Esteghlal Ahvaz (R)	0	0	0	0	0	0	0	0	Relegation to 3rd Division - 1st Stage 2020–21

Updated to match(es) played on 2 September 2020. Source:
Rules for classification: 1) points; 2) goal difference; 3) number of goals scored.

=== Ranking of third-placed teams ===
The results against the tenth-placed team were not counted when determining the ranking of the third placed teams.

Pos	Team	Pld	W	D	L	GF	GA	GD	Pts	Qualification or relegation
1	Yazd Looleh	16	9	3	4	25	21	+4	30	Promotion to Play-off
2	PAS Gilan	16	7	6	3	15	10	+5	27	
3	Shahrdari Noshahr	16	8	2	6	19	17	+2	26	

Updated to match(es) played on 2 September 2020. Source:
Rules for classification: 1) points; 2) goal difference; 3) number of goals scored; 4) play-off at neutral venue.

=== Ranking of seventh-placed teams ===
The results against the tenth-placed team were not counted when determining the ranking of the seventh placed teams.

Pos	Team	Pld	W	D	L	GF	GA	GD	Pts	Qualification or relegation
1	Mohajer Novin Mashhad	16	4	7	5	19	21	−2	19	
2	Sepahan Novin Isfahan	16	4	6	6	21	22	−1	18	
3	Moghavemat Astara	16	2	7	7	19	24	−5	13	Remained in 3rd Division - 2nd Stage 2020–21 after relegation

Updated to match(es) played on 2 September 2020. Source:
Rules for classification: 1) points; 2) goal difference; 3) number of goals scored; 4) play-off at neutral venue.

Moghavemat Astara should have relegated to 3rd Division - 1st Stage as the worst 7th placed team, But due to direct relegation of Karoon Arvand Khorramshahr from 2nd division to 3rd Division - 1st Stage (instead of 3rd Division - 2nd Stage), they remained in 3rd Division - 2nd Stage and not relegated.

== Play-off ==
=== First round ===
Team 1	Score	Team 2	1st leg	2nd leg	Notes
Oghab Tehran	3-2	Yazd Looleh	0-1	3-1	
Esteghlal Shoosh	0-0 (4-5 p)	Javan Novin Sari	0-0	0-0 (a.e.t.)	

=== Second round ===
Team 1	Score	Team 2	1st leg	2nd leg	Notes
Oghab Tehran	3-2	Esteghlal Shoosh	1-1	2-1	

Oghab Tehran promoted to 2020–21 Iran Football's 2nd Division.
