= Bargh Jadid Shiraz F.C. =

Iranian football club

New Bargh
- Full name: New Bargh Fars Football Club
- Founded: 2015; 3 years ago
- Ground: Hafezieh Stadium
- Capacity: 20,000
- Head Coach: Rahman Rezaei
- League: Azadegan League
- Website: https://barghshirazfc.com/
Home colours	Away colours

Bargh Jadid Shiraz Football Club (Persian: برق جدید فارس ) an Iranian football club based in Shiraz, Iran. They currently compete in the Azadegan League. The club is different than the original Bargh Shiraz which competes in League 3.

== History ==
New Bargh was founded in 2015 by Bargh Shiraz fans and started competing in League 2. On 29 September 2016 New Bargh beat local rivals Fajr Sepasi 1–0 in the Round of 64 in the 2016–17 Hazfi Cup.

On 23 May 2017, New Bargh were promoted to the second tiered Azadegan League after beating Shahin Bushehr in a play-off.

== Kit ==
The team is sponsored by Italian sportswear company Givova.
