= Gilanmehr Fouman F.C. =

Iranian football club

گیلان‌مهر فومن
- Full name: Gilanmehr Fouman Football Club
- Founded: 2007; 11 years ago
- Ground: Fuman Stadium; Fuman; Iran
- Manager: Afshin Nazemi
- League: League 2

Gilanmehr Fouman Football Club is an Iranian football club based in Fuman, Iran. They currently compete in 2016–17 Iran Football's 2nd Division.

They reached the Round of 16 in the 2016–17 Hazfi Cup.

== Name history ==
- Shahrdari Fouman (2007–2018)
- Gilanmehr Fouman (2018–)

== Season-by-season ==
The table below shows the achievements of the club in various competitions.

Season	League	Position	Hazfi Cup	Notes
2014–15	3rd Division	4th/Group A	_
2015–16	3rd Division	1st/Group A	_	Promoted
2016–17	2nd Division	8th/Group B	Round of 16

== See also ==
- Iranian football league system
