= Shahrdari Urmia F.C. =

Iranian football club

Shahrdari Urmia
- Full name: Shahrdari Urmia Football Club
- Founded: 2011; 7 years ago
- Ground: Takhti Stadium (Urmia)
- Owner: Municipality of Urmia
- Chairman: Peyman Yousefi
- Manager: Moharram Nashati
- League: League 2

Shahrdari Urmia Football Club is an Iranian football club based in Urmia, West Azerbaijan who play in Iran Football's 2nd Division.
