= Shahrdari Hamedan F.C. =

Iranian football club

Shahrdari Hamedan
- Full name: Shahrdari Hamedan Football Club
- Founded: 2011; 14 years ago
- Ground: Shohada-e Qods Stadium; Hamadan, Iran
- Capacity: 5,000
- League: Azadegan League

Shahrdari Hamedan Football Club is an Iranian football club based in Hamedan, Iran who compete in League 2. Alvand Hamedan was born out of this club.

== Season-by-season ==
The table below shows the achievements of the club in various competitions.

Season	League	Position	Hazfi Cup	Notes
2009–10	2nd Division	6th/Group C

== Stadium ==
Shahrdari Hamedan plays its home matches at the Haji Babaei Martyr Sports Complex in Hamedan, which has a capacity of 10,000 spectators.

== See also ==
- Hazfi Cup
- Iran Football's 2nd Division 2009–10
