= 2021–22 Hazfi Cup =

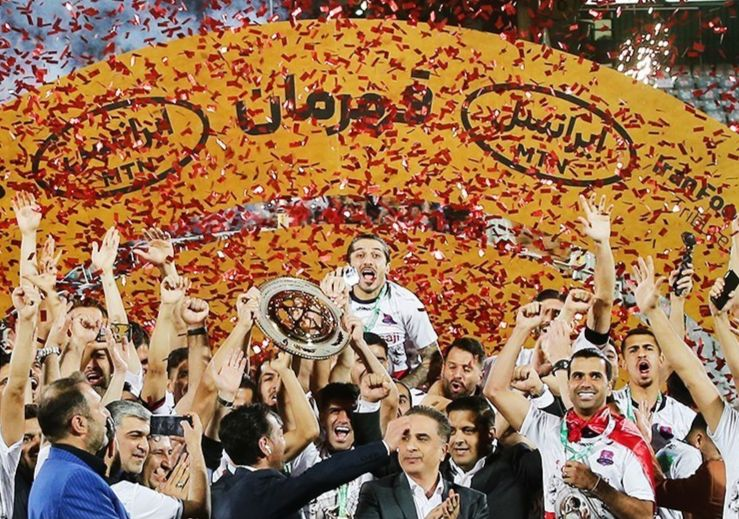

Tournament details
- Country: Iran
- Dates: 10 October 2021 – 27 April 2022
- Teams: 73

Final positions
- Champions: Nassaji Mazandaran
- Runners-up: Aluminium Arak

Tournament statistics
- Matches played: 75
- Goals scored: 149 (1.99 per match)
- Top goal scorer(s): Abbas Tahmasbi (4 goals)

The 2021–22 Hazfi Cup was the 35th season of the Iranian football knockout competition. Nassaji Mazandaran won the competition after defeating Aluminium Arak in the final.

== Participating teams ==
A total of 73 teams (out of a possible total of 96 eligible teams) participated. The teams were divided into four main groups.

- 16 teams of the Persian Gulf Pro League: entering at the Round of 32.
- 18 teams of the Azadegan League: entering at the third round.
- 11 teams (out of a possible total of 28 teams) from the 2nd Division: entering at the second round.
- 28 teams (out of a possible total of 34 teams) from Provincial Leagues: entering from first round.

== Schedule ==
The schedule of the competition is as follows.

| Stage | Round | Draw date | Matches dates |
|---|---|---|---|
| First stage | Round 1 | 29 September 2021 | 10–11 October 2021 |
| First stage | Round 2 | 16 October 2021 | 31 October-2 November 2021 |
| First stage | Round 3 | 10 November 2021 | 26–28 November 2021 |
| Second Stage | Round of 32 | 1 December 2021 | 19–20 December 2021 |
| Second Stage | Round of 16 | 27 December 2021 | 17–18 January 2022, 8 February 2022 |
| Second Stage | Quarter-finals | 8 March 2022 | 9–11 April 2022 |
| Second Stage | Semi-finals | 8 March 2022 | 17,18 April 2022 |
| Second Stage | Final | 8 March 2022 | 27 April 2022 |

== First stage ==
=== First round ===
Number of teams per tier entering this round
| Pro League (1) | 1. division (2) | 2. division (3) | Provincial Leagues (4) | Total |
|---|---|---|---|---|
| 16 / 16 | 18 / 18 | 28 / 28 | 28 / 34 | 90 / 96 |

| 11 October 2021 1 | Heyat Football Germi (4) | 3–3 (a.e.t.) (4–5 p) | Siman Shahrood (4) |
| 14:45 |

| 10 October 2021 1 | SetareganSorkh Tehran (4) | 0–0 (a.e.t.) (3–4 p) | Almas Tazeh Abad Langeroud (4) | Shahriar |
| 14:45 | | | | Stadium: Shabahang |

| 10 October 2021 1 | Novin Keshavarz Aliabad (4) | 0–0 (a.e.t.) (3–4 p) | Payam Zeydi Kashan (4) | Aliabad |
| 14:45 | | | | Stadium: Shahid Aliabadi |

| 11 October 2021 1 | Shohadaye Bonab Marand (4) | w/o | Shahin Gorji Rostam Kala (4) | Marand |
| 15:00 | | | | Stadium: Takhti |

| 11 October 2021 1 | Javaheri Mansour Abyek (4) | 0–0 (a.e.t.) (3–2 p) | Sheys Star Salas Babajani (4) | Abyek |
| 14:30 | | | | Stadium: Takhti |

| 11 October 2021 1 | Artiman Iranian Farshad Khomein (4) | 1–0 | Oghab Pardisan Qom (4) | Khomein |
| 14:45 | | | | Stadium: Motahari |

| 10 October 2021 1 | Makou Javan (4) | w/o | Parvaz Zanjan (4) | Shoot |
| 15:00 | | | | Stadium: Takhti |

| 11 October 2021 1 | Abidar Sanandaj (4) | 2–2 (a.e.t.) (5–4 p) | Vahdat Aghasht (4) | Sanandaj |
| 14:45 | | | | Stadium: Maleknia |

| 11 October 2021 1 | Shahin Dehdari Tehran (4) | 2–1 | Yaran Raeisi Neyshabur (4) |
| 14:45 |

| 11 October 2021 1 | Parsian Harooni Chaharmahal & Bakhtiyari (4) | w/o | Setareh Saz Birjand (4) | Shahr-e Kord |
| 14:45 | | | | Stadium: Enghelab |

| 11 October 2021 1 | Shahrdari Najafshahr (4) | w/o | Vahdat Ivan (4) | Sirjan |
| 14:45 | | | | Stadium: Takhti |

| 10 October 2021 1 | Persian Kish (4) | 0–4 | Do Kooheh Andimeshk (4) | Kish |
| 15:00 | | | | Stadium: Olympic |

| 11 October 2021 1 | Takavar Zabol (4) | w/o | Tam Dehdasht Kohgiluye (4) | Zabol |
| 14:00 | | | | Stadium: Takhti |

| 11 October 2021 1 | Bonto Hesam Mohr (4) | 2–2 (a.e.t.) (7–6 p) | Shahed Deylam (4) |
| 14:30 |

=== Second round ===
Number of teams per tier entering this round
| Pro League (1) | 1. division (2) | 2. division (3) | Provincial Leagues (4) | Total |
|---|---|---|---|---|
| 16 / 16 | 18 / 18 | 14 / 28 | 14 / 34 | 62 / 96 |

| 31 October 2021 2 | Almas Tazeh Abad Langeroud (4) | w/o | Takavar Zabol (4) | Langarud |
| 14:00 | | | | Stadium: Shohada |

| 2 November 2021 2 | Espad Tehran (3) | w/o | Gol Reyhan Alborz (3) |
| 14:15 |

| 1 November 2021 2 | Navad Urmia (3) | 1–0 | Shahin Dehdari Tehran (4) | Urmia |
| 14:30 | Armin Mostafavi | | | Stadium: Takhti |

| 1 November 2021 2 | Javaheri Mansour Abyek (4) | 3–1 | Shahrdari Najafshahr (4) | Qazvin |
| 14:15 | Meysam Khosrow Nejad; Meysam Khosrow Nejad; Mahmoud Asadi | | Amir Reza Makiabadi | Stadium: Sardar Azadegan |

| 1 November 2021 2 | Khalij Fars Mahshahr (3) | 3–0 | Mes Novin Kerman (3) | Mahshahr |
| 14:30 | Abas Tahmasbi 17'; Abas Tahmasbi 17'; Abas Tahmasbi 56'; Rasoul Badavi 70' | | | Stadium: Shohada |

| 31 October 2021 2 | Payam Zeydi Kashan (4) | 2–0 | Shohadaye Bonab Marand (4) | Kashan |
| 14:30 | Javad Gol Mohammadi; Mohammad Amin Mokhtarian | | | Stadium: Amir Kabir |

| 1 November 2021 2 | Payam Toos Khorasan (3) | 2–2 (a.e.t.) (2–4 p) | Bonto Hesam Mohr (4) | Mashhad |
| 14:00 | Mehdi Sahrayi 90+3'; Ehsan Mahrooghi 120+2' | | Hosein Alipoor 90+6'; Saeid Mohammadi 107' | Stadium: Samen |

| 1 November 2021 2 | Oghab Tehran (3) | w/o | Shahrdari Noshahr (3) | Eslamshahr |
| 14:30 | | | | Stadium: Shohada |

| 1 November 2021 2 | Siman Shahrood (4) | w/o | Chooka Talesh (3) | Shahrud |
| 14:00 | | | | Stadium: Takhti |

| 1 November 2021 2 | Do Kooheh Andimeshk (4) | 0–0 (a.e.t.) (4–1 p) | Sepidrood Rasht (3) | Andimeshk |
| 14:30 | | | | Stadium: Shahid Sarvandi |

| 1 November 2021 2 | Shahin Bandar Ameri (3) | w/o | Artiman Iranian Farshad Khomein (4) | Ahram |
| 14:30 | | | | Stadium: Shohada |

| 1 November 2021 2 | Van Pars Naghsh-e-Jahan (3) | w/o | Atrak Bojnourd (3) | Fuladshahr |
| 14:30 | | | | Stadium: Foolad Shahr |

| 31 October 2021 2 | Makou Javan (4) | 2–2 (a.e.t.) (4–1 p) | Abidar Sanandaj (4) | Shoot |
| 14:30 | Amir Hosein Mokhtarpoor; Hosein Sharifi | | Sina Izadi; Reza Karami | Stadium: Takhti |

| 31 October 2021 2 | Shahid Oraki Eslamshahr (3) | 6–0 | Parsian Harooni Chaharmahal & Bakhtiyari (4) | Eslamshahr |
| 14:30 | Reza Naderi; Reza Naderi; Hamzeh Ali; Hamzeh Ali; Alireza Basavand; Davood Sepehri | | | Stadium: Shohada |

=== Third round ===
Number of teams per tier entering this round
| Pro League (1) | 1. division (2) | 2. division (3) | Provincial Leagues (4) | Total |
|---|---|---|---|---|
| 16 / 16 | 18 / 18 | 7 / 28 | 7 / 34 | 48 / 96 |

| 27 November 2021 3 | Shahrdari Astara (2) | 3–2 | Almas Tazeh Abad Langeroud (4) | Talesh |
| 14:00 | | | | Stadium: Pooriyaye Vali; Referee: Mohammad Bagher Poor Bagher |

| 26 November 2021 3 | Esteghlal Khuzestan (2) | 0–1 (a.e.t.) | Khalij Fars Mahshahr (3) | Ahwaz |
| 14:30 | | | | Stadium: Takhti; Referee: Sajjad Yari |

| 27 November 2021 3 | Mashin Sazi (2) | 1–0 | Siman Shahrood (4) | Tabriz |
| 14:15 | | | | Stadium: Yadegar-e Emam |

| 27 November 2021 3 | Mes Kerman (2) | 1–1 (a.e.t.) (6–5 p) | Khooshe Talaei Saveh (2) | Kerman |
| 14:00 | | | | Stadium: Imam Ali |

| 27 November 2021 3 | Bonto Hesam Mohr (4) | 1–4 | Arman Gohar Sirjan (2) | Jam |
| 14:00 | | | | Stadium: Takhti; Referee: Ali Aghajari |

| 27 November 2021 3 | Qashqai Shiraz (2) | 0–0 (a.e.t.) (4–2 p) | Shahin Bandar Ameri (3) | Shiraz |
| 14:00 | | | | Stadium: Hafezieh |

| 27 November 2021 3 | Rayka Babol (2) | 2–1 | Espad Tehran (3) | Kiakola |
| 14:00 | | | | Stadium: Shohada; Referee: Abdolhossein Baastaan |

| 27 November 2021 3 | Saipa (2) | 0–2 | Shahin (2) | Tehran |
| 14:15 | | | | Stadium: PAS Ghavamin |

| 27 November 2021 3 | Shahrdari Hamedan (2) | 0–1 | Kheybar Khorramabad (2) | Hamedan |
| 14:15 | | | | Stadium: Haji Babayi; Referee: Mohammad Hossein Torabian |

| 27 November 2021 3 | Esteghlal Molasani (2) | 0–0 (a.e.t.) (4–2 p) | Pars Jonoubi Jam (2) | Ahwaz |
| 14:30 | | | | Stadium: Takhti; Referee: Meysam Abbaspour |

| 27 November 2021 3 | Mes Shahr-e Babak (2) | 2–1 | Malavan (2) | Sirjan |
| 14:00 | | | | Stadium: Imam Ali |

| 27 November 2021 3 | Navad Urmia (3) | 2–1 | Van Pars Naghsh-e-Jahan (3) | Urumia |
| 14:00 | | | | Stadium: Takhti |

| 27 November 2021 3 | Shahrdari Noshahr (3) | 4–1 | Javaheri Mansour Abyek (4) | Noshahr |
| | | | | Stadium: Shohada; Referee: Ali Mohammadi Poor Roodineh |

| 28 November 2021 3 | Shahid Oraki Eslamshahr (3) | 4–1 | Makou Javan (4) | Eslamshahr |
| 14:00 | | | | Stadium: Shohada |

| 27 November 2021 3 | Shams Azar Qazvin (2) | 5–2 | Do Kooheh Andimeshk (4) | Qazvin |
| 14:00 | | | | Stadium: Sardar Azadegan; Referee: Amir Armand |

| 27 November 2021 3 | Vista Toorbin Tehran (2) | 3–1 | Payam Zeydi Kashan (4) | Shahr Qods |
| 14:15 | | | | Stadium: Shohada; Referee: Hojat Ghapanoori |

== Second stage ==
=== Bracket ===
Fourth round (round of 32); 19–20 December 2021
Shahin Bushehr | 0 (3)
Naft Masjed Soleyman | 0 (4)
Khalij Fars Mahshahr | 1
Havadar | 0
Tractor S.C. | 0 (1)
Mes Rafsanjan | 0 (3)
Shahr Khodro (a.e.t.) | 2
Esteghlal Mollasani | 1
Zob Ahan | 3
Rayka Babol | 0
Persepolis | 4
Vista Toorbin | 0
Aluminium Arak (a.e.t.) | 2
Fajr Sepasi | 0
Sepahan | 1
Shahid Oraki | 0
Paykan | 1
Qashqai | 0
Esteghlal | 1 (4)
Navad Urmia | 1 (2)
Arman Gohar | 0
Nassaji | 1
Gol Gohar | 4
Shahrdari Astara | 0
Machine Sazi | 0
Mes Kerman | 2
Foolad | 3
Shahrdari Noshahr | 0
Kheybar | 3
Mes Shahr-e Babak | 1
Sanat Naft | 3
Shams Azar | 1

Fifth round (round of 16); 17–18 January; 8 February 2022
Naft Masjed Soleyman | 1
Khalij Fars Mahshahr | 2
Mes Rafsanjan (a.e.t.) | 1
Shahr Khodro | 0
Zob Ahan | 0
Persepolis | 3
Aluminium Arak (a.e.t.) | 1
Sepahan | 0
Paykan | 0
Esteghlal (a.e.t.) | 1
Nassaji | 3
Gol Gohar | 1
Mes Kerman | 1 (5)
Foolad | 1 (4)
Kheybar | 5
Sanat Naft | 1

Sixth round (quarter-final); 9–11 April 2022
Khalij Fars Mahshahr | 1(4)
Mes Rafsanjan | 1(2)
Persepolis | 2
Aluminium Arak | 3
Esteghlal | 0(4)
Nassaji | 0(5)
Mes Kerman | 1
Kheybar | 0

Semi-final; 18–19 April 2022
Khalij Fars Mahshahr | 0
Aluminium Arak | 1
Nassaji | 1
Mes Kerman | 0

Final; 27 April 2022
Aluminium Arak | 0
Nassaji | 1

=== Fourth round (round of 32) ===
The 16 teams from Iran Pro League entered the competition from the second stage.

Number of teams per tier entering this round
| Pro League (1) | 1. division (2) | 2. division (3) | Provincial Leagues (4) | Total |
|---|---|---|---|---|
| 16 / 16 | 12 / 18 | 4 / 28 | 0 / 34 | 32 / 96 |

| 19 December 2021 4 | Shahin (2) | 0–0 (a.e.t.) (3–4 p) | Naft Masjed Soleyman (1) | Bushehr |
| 15:30 | | | | Stadium: Shahid Mahdavi |

| 19 December 2021 4 | Peykan (1) | 1–0 | Qashqai Shiraz (2) | Tehran |
| 15:00 | Gholamreza Sabet Imani 74' (P) | | | Stadium: PAS Ghavamin |

| 20 December 2021 4 | Tractor (1) | 0–0 (a.e.t.) (1–3 p) | Mes Rafsanjan (1) | Tabriz |
| 15:00 | | | | Stadium: Sardar Soleimani |
| | Penalties |
| | Goalkeeper: Mahdi Haghighat; Peyman Babaei (penalty missed); Saman Nariman Jahan (penalty scored); Abdollah Hosseini (penalty missed); Mohammad Mehdi Ghanbari (penalty missed) | | Goalkeeper: Faiz Al-Rushaidi; (penalty scored) Godwin Mensha; (penalty scored) Hassan Jafari; (penalty scored) Houman Rabiezadeh |

| 19 December 2021 4 | Arman Gohar Sirjan (2) | 0–1 | Nassaji (1) | Sirjan |
| 14:00 | | | Hassan Najafi 13' | Stadium: Imam Ali |

| 19 December 2021 4 | Sepahan (1) | 1–0 | Shahid Oraki Eslamshahr (3) | Isfahan |
| 17:30 | Sajjad Shahbazzadeh 60' | | | Stadium: Naghsh-e Jahan |

| 19 December 2021 4 | Shahr Khodro (1) | 2–1 (a.e.t.) | Esteghlal Molasani (2) | Mashhad |
| 14:45 | Mohammad Reza Fallahian 80', 120' | | Reza Karamolachaab 74' | Stadium: Samen |

| 19 December 2021 4 | Zob Ahan (1) | 3–0 | Rayka Babol (2) | Isfahan |
| 15:00 | Arman Ghasemi 62'; Mohammad Khodabandeloo 80' (P); Aref Rostami 84' | | | Stadium: Foolad Shahr |

| 19 December 2021 4 | Esteghlal (1) | 1–1 (a.e.t.) (4–2 p) | Navad Urmia (3) | Tehran |
| 17:30 | Arman Ramezani 88' | | Sajjad Tajatlou 59' | Stadium: Azadi |
| | Penalties |
| | Goalkeeper: Alireza Rezaei; Mohammad Reza Azadi (penalty scored); Saeid Mehri (penalty missed); Babak Moradi (penalty scored); Amirali Sadeghi (penalty scored); Arash Rezavand (penalty scored) | | Goalkeeper: Reza Mansouri; (penalty scored) Mohsen Soleimani; (penalty missed) Yamin Fallah; (penalty scored) Keyvan Marabi; (penalty missed) Mohammad Taftian |

| 19 December 2021 4 | Gol Gohar (1) | 4–0 | Shahrdari Astara (2) | Sirjan |
| 16:30 | Hossein Nokhodkar 8'; Amin Pourali 32'; Mohammad Reza Khanzadeh 55'; Morteza Tabrizi 57' | | | Stadium: Sardar Soleimani |

| 19 December 2021 4 | Foolad (1) | 3–0 | Shahrdari Noshahr (3) | Ahvaz |
| 17:45 | Ahmad Abdollahzadeh 45' (P); OG 57'; Ayanda Patosi 87' | | | Stadium: Shohadaye Foolad |

| 19 December 2021 4 | Aluminium Arak (1) | 2–0 (a.e.t.) | Fajr Sepasi (1) | Arak |
| 15:30 | Amir Mohammad Houshmand 111'; Amir Noori 122' | | | Stadium: Imam Khomeini |

| 20 December 2021 4 | Sanat Naft (1) | 3–1 | Shams Azar Qazvin (2) | Abadan |
| 14:00 | Abbas Bouazar 3'; Mohammad Reza Ghobeishavi 27'; Shervin Bozorg 40' | | Abbas Asgari 81' | Stadium: Takhti |

| 19 December 2021 4 | Mashin Sazi (2) | 1–2 | Mes Kerman (2) | Tabriz |
| 15:00 | Davood Shahvarooghi 51' | | Milad Saremi 7'; Bahram Rashidi Farrokhi 78' | Stadium: Yadegar-e Emam |

| 20 December 2021 4 | Khalij Fars Mahshahr (3) | 1–0 | Havadar Pakdasht (1) | Mahshahr |
| 14:30 | Abbas Tahmsabi 85' (P) | | | Stadium: Shohada |

| 20 December 2021 4 | Persepolis (1) | 4–0 | Vista Toorbin Tehran (2) | Tehran |
| 17:30 | Mohammad Sharifi 64'; Siamak Nemati 65'; Issa Alekasir 80'; Ali Shojaei 90+4' | | | Stadium: Azadi |

| 19 December 2021 4 | Kheybar Khorramabad (2) | 3–1 | Mes Shahr-e Babak (2) | Khorramabad |
| 14:30 | Mehrdad Ghanbari 18' (P), 39' (P); Mohammad Ali Safia 90+4' | | Milad Shabanlou 51' | Stadium: Takhti |

=== Fifth round (round of 16) ===
Number of teams per tier entering this round
| Pro League (1) | 1. division (2) | 2. division (3) | Provincial Leagues (4) | Total |
|---|---|---|---|---|
| 13 / 16 | 2 / 18 | 1 / 28 | 0 / 34 | 16 / 96 |

| 17 January 2022 5 | Aluminium Arak (1) | 1–1 (a.e.t.) (4–3 p) | Sepahan (1) | Arak, Iran |
| 14:00 | | | | Stadium: Imam Khomeini |

| 17 January 2022 5 | Kheybar Khorramabad (2) | 5–1 | Sanat Naft (1) | Khorramabad |
| 14:00 | | | | Stadium: Takhti |

| 17 January 2022 5 | Mes Kerman (2) | 1–1 (a.e.t.) (5–4 p) | Foolad (1) | Kerman |
| 14:30 | | | | Stadium: Imam Ali |

| 17 January 2022 5 | Zob Ahan (1) | 0–3 | Persepolis (1) | Fuladshahr |
| 15:30 | | | | Stadium: Foolad Shahr |

| 18 January 2022 5 | Nassaji (1) | 3–1 | Gol Gohar (1) | TBA |
| 14:00 | | | | Stadium: TBA |

| 18 January 2022 5 | Mes Rafsanjan (1) | 1–0 (a.e.t.) | Shahr Khodro (1) | Sarcheshmeh |
| 14:30 | | | | Stadium: Shahid Zeynali |

| 18 January 2022 5 | Naft Masjed Soleyman (1) | 1–2 | Khalij Fars Mahshahr (3) | Masjed Soleyman |
| 14:30 | | | | Stadium: Behnam Mohammadi |

| 8 February 2022 5 | Peykan (1) | 0–1 (a.e.t.) | Esteghlal (1) | Tehran |
| 17:00 | | | Motahari 92' | Stadium: PAS Ghavamin |

=== Sixth round (quarter-finals) ===
Number of teams per tier entering this round
| Pro League (1) | 1. division (2) | 2. division (3) | Provincial Leagues (4) | Total |
|---|---|---|---|---|
| 5 / 16 | 2 / 18 | 1 / 28 | 0 / 34 | 8 / 96 |

| 9 April 2022 6 | Khalij Fars Mahshahr (3) | 1–1 (a.e.t.) (4–2 p) | Mes Rafsanjan (1) | Abadan |
| 20:15 | Abbas Ghasemi 84' | | Mohammad Reza Soleimani 23' | Stadium: Takhti Stadium |
| | Penalties |
| | Goalkeeper: Mehdi Amiri; Abbas Tahmasebi (penalty scored); Bahman Jahantigh (penalty scored); Ali Askari (penalty scored); Abbas Ghasemi (penalty scored) | | Goalkeeper: Davoud Noushi Soufiani; (penalty scored) Godwin Mensha; (penalty scored) Ghaem Eslamikhah; (penalty missed) Aghil Kaabi; (penalty missed) Mehrdad Rezaei |

| 11 April 2022 6 | Esteghlal (1) | 0–0 (a.e.t.) (4–5 p) | Nassaji (1) | Tehran |
| 20:30 | | | | Stadium: Azadi Stadium; Attendance: 40,000 |
| | Penalties |
| | Goalkeeper: Alireza Rezaei; Arthur Yamga (penalty scored); Rudy Gestede (penalty scored); Mehdi Mehdipour (penalty scored); Azizbek Amonov (penalty missed); Arman Ramezani (penalty scored) | | Goalkeeper: Alireza Haghighi; (penalty scored) Ayoub Kalantari; (penalty scored) Mehrdad Abdi; (penalty scored) Saeid Gholamalibeygi; (penalty scored) Mohammad Mehdi Nazari; (penalty scored) Hamed Shiri |

| 10 April 2022 6 | Persepolis (1) | 2–3 | Aluminium Arak (1) | Tehran |
| 20:30 | | | | Stadium: Azadi Stadium |

| 9 April 2022 6 | Mes Kerman (2) | 1–0 | Kheybar Khorramabad (2) | Kerman |
| 20:00 | | | | Stadium: Shahid Bahonar Stadium |

=== Seventh round (semi-finals) ===
Number of teams per tier entering this round
| Pro League (1) | 1. division (2) | 2. division (3) | Provincial Leagues (4) | Total |
|---|---|---|---|---|
| 2 / 16 | 1 / 18 | 1 / 28 | 0 / 34 | 4 / 96 |

| 18 April 2022 7 | Aluminium Arak (1) | 1–0 | Khalij Fars Mahshahr (3) | Arak |
| 20:30 | | | | Stadium: Imam Khomeini; Attendance: 5,000 |

| 19 April 2022 7 | Nassaji (1) | 1–0 (a.e.t.) | Mes Kerman (2) | Tehran |
| 20:30 | Hamed Shiri 118' | | | Stadium: Azadi Stadium; Attendance: 32,000 |

=== Eighth round (final) ===
Number of teams per tier entering this round
| Pro League (1) | 1. division (2) | 2. division (3) | Provincial Leagues (4) | Total |
|---|---|---|---|---|
| 2 / 16 | 0 / 18 | 0 / 28 | 0 / 34 | 2 / 96 |

| 27 April 2022 8 | Nassaji Mazandaran (1) | 1–0 | Aluminium Arak (1) | Tehran |
| 20:30 | Abdi 58' | Report | | Stadium: Azadi Stadium; Attendance: 50,000; Referee: Mohammad Hossein Zahedifard |

== See also ==
- Iran Pro League 2021–22
- Azadegan League 2021–22
- Iran Football's 2nd Division 2021–22
- Iran Football's 3rd Division 2021–22
- Iranian Super Cup
