= 2020–21 League 2 (Iran) =

Iran Football's 2nd Division
- Season: 2020–21
- Champions: Mes Shahr-e Babak
- Promoted: Mes Shahr-e Babak; Shahrdari Hamedan; Vista Toorbin
- Relegated: Naft Omidiyeh; Naft va Gaz Gachsaran; Sardar Bukan; Avalan Kamyaran
- Matches: 366
- Goals: 745 (2.04 per match)
- Top goalscorer: Nima Eskandarzadeh (11)
- Biggest home win: Shahid Ghandi Yazd 10-1 Sardar Bukan
- Biggest away win: Sardar Bukan 0-7 Shahin Bandar Ameri

The 2020–21 Iran Football's 2nd Division season was the 20th under 2nd Division since its establishment in the current format in 2001. The season featured 21 teams from the 2nd Division 2019–20, three new team relegated from the 2019–20 Azadegan League: Elmoadab Tabriz F.C., Sepidrood Rasht S.C., Nirooye Zamini F.C., and four new teams promoted from the 3rd Division 2019–20: Shahin Bandar Ameri, Mohtasham Tabriz, Vista Toorbin, Oghab Tehran F.C.
These changes has been applied before the season:

Team	Replaced Team
Kheibar Khorramabad	Spad Tehran
Caspian Qazvin	Shams Azar Qazvin

== Teams ==
=== Stadia and locations ===
Locations of clubs in 2020–21 Iran Football's 2nd Division

== League table ==
=== Group A ===
Pos	Team	Pld	W	D	L	GF	GA	GD	Pts	Promotion or relegation
1	Sh. Hamedan	26	13	9	4	25	12	+13	48	2021–22 Azadegan League & Final Match
2	Vista Toorbin Tehran	26	13	8	5	35	21	+14	47	Playoff round
3	Mes Novin Kerman	26	12	8	6	28	17	+11	44	
4	Elm o Adab Tabriz	26	10	12	4	26	15	+11	42	
5	Sepidrood Rasht	26	9	10	7	23	22	+1	37	
6	Spad Tehran	26	8	9	9	23	28	−5	33	
7	Iranjavan Bushehr	26	8	9	9	25	31	−6	33	
8	Mohtasham Tabriz	26	8	8	10	25	23	+2	32	
9	Sh. Bandar Abbas	26	8	8	10	25	27	−2	32	
10	Omid Ganaveh	26	7	9	10	21	22	−1	30	
11	Foolad B	26	7	9	10	26	32	−6	30	
12	Melli Haffari Ahvaz	26	6	11	9	17	19	−2	29	
13	Ettehad (Avalan) Kamyaran	26	6	8	12	21	34	−13	26	Relegation to 2021–22 3rd Division 2nd Stage
14	Naft va Gaz Gachsaran	26	4	8	14	11	28	−17	20	Relegation to 2021–22 3rd Division 2nd Stage

Updated to match(es) played on 7 July 2021. Source: "جدول لیگ دسته دوم - گروه اول". Dsport.
Rules for classification: 1) points; 2) goal difference; 3) number of goals scored; 4) Head-to-Head Matches (With away goal rule applied); if still tied and teams are not in promotion or relegation situation or season would not finished, teams will share the place; if not: 5) Play-off match at a neutral venue.

=== Group B ===
Pos	Team	Pld	W	D	L	GF	GA	GD	Pts	Promotion or relegation
1	Mes Shahr Babak	26	17	7	2	38	6	+32	58	2021–22 Azadegan League & Final Match
2	Sh. Mahshahr	26	13	6	7	44	27	+17	45	Playoff round
3	Nirooye Zamini Tehran	26	10	10	6	30	17	+13	40	
4	Shahid Ghandi Yazd	26	11	12	3	43	18	+25	39 (Note: Shahid Ghandi Yazd was deducted 6 points due to match-fixing scandal.)	
5	Shahin Bandar Ameri	26	12	9	5	46	24	+22	39 (Note: Shahin Bandar Ameri was deducted 6 points due to match-fixing scandal.)	
6	Shams Azar Qazvin	26	9	12	5	32	26	+6	39	
7	Oghab Tehran	26	10	8	8	34	23	+11	38	
8	Shohadaye Babolsar	26	10	8	8	23	19	+4	38	
9	Atrak Bojnourd	26	8	8	10	25	29	−4	32	
10	Pas Hamedan	26	7	9	10	23	29	−6	30	
11	Milad Mehr Iranian	26	6	6	14	22	45	−23	24	
12	Shahrdari Bam	26	4	8	14	18	41	−23	20	
13	Sardar Bukan	26	4	8	14	25	54	−29	20	Relegation to 2021–22 3rd Division 2nd Stage
14	Naft Omidiyeh	26	4	3	19	10	55	−45	15	Relegation to 2021–22 3rd Division 2nd Stage

Updated to match(es) played on 14 July 2021. Source: "جدول لیگ دسته دوم - گروه دوم". Dsport.
Rules for classification: 1) points; 2) goal difference; 3) number of goals scored; 4) Head-to-Head Matches (With away goal rule applied); if still tied and teams are not in promotion or relegation situation or season would not finished, teams will share the place; if not: 5) Play-off match at a neutral venue.

== 2nd Division Play-off ==
Team 1	Agg.	Team 2	1st leg	2nd leg
Vista Toorbin Tehran	3-3	Shahrdari Mahshahr	1-1	2-2

=== Leg 1 ===
6 September 2021
19:45

Vista Toorbin Tehran	1-1	Shahrdari Mahshahr
Hamed Akbaripoor 42'		Sajad Ghanavati 50'

Ghadir, Tehran
Attendance: 0
Referee: Ashkan Khorshidi

=== Leg 2 ===
12 September 2021
19:45

Shahrdari Mahshahr	2-2	Vista Toorbin Tehran
Nima Partovi; Amin Askari		Aref Seifi; Morteza Negahdari

Shohada, Mahshahr
Attendance: 0
Referee: Maysam Heydari

source= Vista Toorbin Tehran won 3-3 on aggregate (on away goals) and promoted to 2021-22 Azadegan League.

== 2nd Division Final ==
Team 1	Score	Team 2
Shahrdari Hamedan	0-0 (5-6p)	Mes Shahr-e Babak

=== Single Match ===
26 July 2021
19:30

Shahrdari Hamedan	0-0 (Note: The game had no Extra Time in accords between two teams and Iranian Football League Organisation.)	Mes Shahr-e Babak
Penalties
Goalkeeper: Mohammad Saberizadeh; Hossein Kazemi (penalty missed); Mohammad Beiranvand (penalty scored); Amir Mohammad Sanayi (penalty scored); Amir Hossein Ghasemi (penalty scored); Armin Talayimanesh (penalty scored); Mehdi Khalaj (penalty scored); Mahid Shabani (penalty missed)	5-6	Goalkeeper: Vahid Asgharzadeh; (penalty scored) Rasoul Baharvandi; (penalty scored) Mohammad Ashtiyani; (penalty missed) Alireza Ghasemi; (penalty scored) Hamed Ketab Ghal'e; (penalty scored) Alireza Valizadeh; (penalty scored) Mohammadreza Firouzzadeh; (penalty scored) Sadegh Rezayi

Shahid Dastgerdi, Tehran
Attendance: 0 (Note: The whole football matches in 2020-21 season, played behind closed doors due to the COVID-19 pandemic in Iran.)
Referee: Enayat Ghoochkanloo
