= 2023–24 Shams Azar F.C. season =

Shams Azar
2023–24 season
- Chairman: Shahab Zandi
- Stadium: Sardar Azadegan Stadium
- Persian Gulf Pro League: 8th
- Iranian Hazfi Cup: Round of 32

The 2023–24 season is the Shams Azar's first season in the Persian Gulf Pro League.

== Squad ==
No.	Name	Date of Birth (Age)	Nationality	Position (s)	Since	App	Goals	Assist	Ends	Signed from	Transfer fee	Notes
goalkeepers
12	Koroush Maleki	9 May 1991 (age 35)	(Iran)	GK	2023	0	0	0	2024	Kheybar	Free	
Defenders
5	Saeed Karimi	22 March 1997 (age 29)	(Iran)	DF	2023	0	0	0	2024	Malavan	Free	
19	Alireza Daghagheleh	1 November 1996 (age 29)	(Iran)	DF	2023	0	0	0	2024	Naft MIS	Free	
71	Pouria Gholami	2 September 1994 (age 31)	(Iran)	DF	2023	2	0	0	2024	Kheybar	Free	
Midfielders
13	Jafar Barzegar	25 April 1993 (age 33)	(Iran)	MF	2023	2	0	0	2024	Arman Gohar	Free	
23	Sadegh Alousabih		(Iran)	MF	2022	26	3	0	2024	Khalij Fars	Free	
Forwards
7	Abbas Asgari	11 September 1990 (age 35)	(Iran)	FW	2021	23	10	7	2024	Naft MIS	Free	
99	Hossein Fazeli	12 June 1993 (age 33)	(Iran)	FW	2023	3	1	2	2024	Khooshe Talaei	Free	

== New Contracts ==
No	P	Name	Age	Contract length	Contract ends	Source

== Transfers ==
=== In ===
Row	No	P	Nat.	Name	Age	Moving from	Ends	Transfer fee	Type	Transfer window	Quota	Source
1		DF	(Iran)	Erfan Ghahremani	25	(Iran) Pars Jonoubi	2024		Transfer	Summer		
2		DF	(Iran)	Mohammad Amin Saeidavi	31	(Iran) Esteghlal Mollasani	2024		Transfer	Summer		
3		GK	(Iran)	Mehdi Mohammadi	21	(Iran) Arman Gohar	2024		Transfer	Summer		
4		GK	(Iran)	Koroush Maleki	32	(Iran) Kheybar	2024		Transfer	Summer		
5		DF	(Iran)	Alireza Daghagheleh	26	(Iran) Naft MIS	2024		Transfer	Summer		
6		DF	(Iran)	Saeed Karimi	26	(Iran) Malavan	2024		Transfer	Summer		

=== Out ===
Row	No	P	Nat.	Name	Age	Moving to	Transfer fee	Type	Transfer window	Source
1	27	FW	(Iran)	Aliasghar Aarabi	27	Mes Rafsanjan		Transfer	Summer	
2	55	DF	(Iran)	Milad Bagheri	28	Malavan		Transfer	Summer	
3	6	MF	(Iran)	Hossein Abarghouei	25	Kheybar Khorramabad		Transfer	Summer	
4	12	GK	(Iran)	Alireza Heidari	30	Khooshe Talaei		Transfer	Summer	
5	99	MF	(Iran)	Hossein Fazeli	30	Shahr Raz		Transfer	Summer	
6	14	MF	(Iran)	Kanaan Tahernejad		Pars Jam		Transfer	Summer	
7	8	FW	(Iran)	Milad Ahmadi	28	Khooshe Talaei		Transfer	Summer	
8	13	MF	(Iran)	Jafar Barzegar	30	Khooshe Talaei		Transfer	Summer	
9	40	MF	(Iran)	Jafar Barzegar	31	saipa		Transfer	Summer	
10	7	FW	(Iran)	Abbas Asgari	32	Naft MIS		Transfer	Summer	
11	18	FW	(Iran)	Mohammad Kazemi	28	Shahr Raz		Transfer	Summer	
12	1	GK	(Iran)	Mir Rasoul Hosseini		Damash Gilan		Transfer	Summer	
13	44	MF	(Iran)	Rouhollah Safavian	24	Shahr Raz		Transfer	Summer	
14	77	FW	(Iran)	Ahmad Jabouri	30	Naft MIS		Transfer	Summer	
15	71	DF	(Iran)	Pouria Gholami	28	Mes Kerman		Transfer	Summer	
16	66	MF	(Iran)	Soheil Lashkari	18	Bargh Shiraz		Transfer	Summer	
17	2	DF	(Iran)	Vahid Nemati	33			Transfer	Summer	
18	67	FW	(Iran)	Sayad Kokabi Asl	30			Transfer	Summer	
19	21	DF	(Iran)	Seyed Mojtaba Hosseini	29			Transfer	Summer	
20	17	FW	(Iran)	Reza Arvin				Transfer	Summer	

== staff ==
Position	Staff
Head coach	(Iran) Saeid Daghighi
First-team coach	(Iran) Mehrdad Karimian
Assistant Manager	(Iran) Morteza Shahsawari
Assistant Manager	(Iran) Mehdi Barzegar
Goalkeeping coach	(Iran) Shahram Mehraban
Fitness Coach	(Iran) Yaser Jalali
Analyzers	(Iran) Yunus Pirvi
Team Manager	(Iran) Majid Rezaei

== Competitions ==
=== Overview ===
Competition	First match	Last match	Starting round	Final position	Record							
Competition	First match	Last match	Starting round	Final position	Pld	W	D	L	GF	GA	GD	Win %
PGPL	-	-	Matchday 1	-	0	0	0	0	0	0	+0	—
Hazfi Cup	-	-	Round of 32	-	0	0	0	0	0	0	+0	—
Total					0	0	0	0	0	0	+0	—

Last updated: 21 june 2023
Source: Competitions

=== Persian Gulf Pro League ===
==== Results summary ====
Overall								Home						Away					
Pld	W	D	L	GF	GA	GD	Pts	W	D	L	GF	GA	GD	W	D	L	GF	GA	GD
0	0	0	0	0	0	0	0	0	0	0	0	0	0	0	0	0	0	0	0

Last updated: 23 April 2023.
Source: Ipl Stats

==== League table ====
Pos	Team	Pld	W	D	L	GF	GA	GD	Pts
6	Malavan	30	10	11	9	31	26	+5	41
7	Aluminium Arak	30	10	9	11	27	33	−6	39 (Note: Aluminium Arak finished ahead of Shams Azar on head-to-head goal difference: Aluminium Arak 2–0 Shams Azar, Shams Azar 2–1 Aluminium Arak)
8	Shams Azar (Note: Shams Azar was deducted 3 points due to the use of an unauthorized player.)	30	11	9	10	35	35	0	39
9	Gol Gohar	30	8	12	10	29	28	+1	36
10	Mes Rafsanjan	30	8	11	11	32	37	−5	35

Source: Iran Football League Organization - League Full Table, Iplstats
Rules for classification: 1) Points; 2) Head-to-head points; 3) Head-to-head goal difference; 4) Total goal difference; 5) Total goals scored; 6) Play-off at neutral venue.
(Note: Head-to-head record is used only after all the matches between the teams in question have been played).
