= 2019–20 Azadegan League =

29th season of Azadegan League

Azadegan League
- Season: 2019–20
- Champions: Mes Rafsanjan
- Promoted: Mes Rafsanjan; Aluminium Arak
- Relegated: Nirooye Zamini; Sepidrood; Elmoadab Tabriz
- Matches: 288
- Goals: 605 (2.1 per match)
- Top goalscorer: Hamid Kazemi (17 goals)
- Biggest home win: Malavan 7–0 Elmoadab Tabriz (15 July 2020)
- Biggest away win: Sepidrood 0–4 Khooshe Talaei Saveh (2 August 2020)
- Highest scoring: Malavan 7–0 Elmoadab Tabriz (15 July 2020)

The 2019–20 Azadegan League was the 29th season of the Azadegan League and 19th as the second highest division since its establishment in 1991. The season featured 11 teams from the 2018–19 Azadegan League, two new teams relegated from the 2018–19 Persian Gulf Pro League: Sepidrood and Esteghlal Khuzestan and two new teams promoted from the 2018–19 League 2: Khooshe Talaei Saveh, Arman Gohar Sirjan and Nirooye Zamini as champion, runner-up and third placed team respectively. Damash replaced Karoon Arvand Khorramshahr, while Elmoadab Tabriz replaced Shahrdari Tabriz. Khooneh be Khooneh changed their name into Rayka Babol. The league started on 17 August 2019 and was scheduled to end in April 2020 but in March 2020 it was suspended due to COVID-19 pandemic in Iran until June 2020. After suspension, the league was ended on 16 August 2020. Hamid Kazemi of Havadar emerged as the league's top scorer with 17 goals.

== Teams ==
=== Stadia and locations ===
Locations of clubs

Team	Location	Stadium	Capacity
Aluminium Arak	Arak	Imam Khomeini	15,000
Arman Gohar Sirjan	Sirjan	Takhti Stadium	5,000
Baadraan Tehran	Tehran	Kargaran	5,000
Damash	Rasht	Shahid Dr. Azodi	11,000
Elmoadab Tabriz	Tabriz	Marzdaran Stadium	5,000
Esteghlal Khuzestan	Ahvaz	Takhti	38,900
Fajr Sepasi	Shiraz	Hafezieh	15,000
Gol Reyhan Alborz	Karaj	Enghelab	15,000
Havadar	Tehran	Shohadaye Eslamshar	8,250
Khooshe Talaei Saveh	Saveh	Shahid Chamran	3,000
Malavan	Bandar-e Anzali	Takhti Anzali	8,000
Mes Kerman	Kerman	Shahid Bahonar	15,430
Mes Rafsanjan	Rafsanjan	Shohadaye Noushabad	5,000
Navad Urmia	Urmia	Shahid Bakeri	15,000
Nirooye Zamini	Tehran	Shohada of Tehran Nezaja	TBA
Qashqai	Shiraz	Hafezieh	15,000
Rayka Babol	Babol	Haft-e Tir	6,000
Sepidrood	Rasht	Sardar Jangal	15,000

=== Number of teams by region ===
	Region	Number of teams	Teams
1	Gilan	3	Damash, Malavan, Sepidrood
2	Kerman	3	Arman Gohar Sirjan, Mes Kerman, Mes Rafsanjan
3	Tehran	3	Baadraan, Havadar, Nirooye Zamini
4	Fars	2	Fajr Sepasi, Qashqai
5	Markazi	2	Aluminium Arak, Khooshe Talaei Saveh
6	Alborz	1	Gol Reyhan Alborz
7	East Azerbaijan	1	Elmoadab Tabriz
8	Khuzestan	1	Esteghlal Khuzestan
9	Mazandaran	1	Rayka Babol
10	West Azerbaijan	1	Navad Urmia

== League table ==
Pos	Team	Pld	W	D	L	GF	GA	GD	Pts	Promotion or relegation
1	Mes Rafsanjan (P)	34	19	10	5	56	29	+27	67	Promotion to 2020–21 Persian Gulf Pro League
2	Aluminium Arak (P)	34	17	12	5	40	20	+20	63	Promotion to 2020–21 Persian Gulf Pro League
3	Mes Kerman	34	17	12	5	42	23	+19	63	
4	Khooshe Talaei Saveh	34	17	8	9	43	26	+17	59	
5	Baadraan Tehran	34	16	7	11	50	38	+12	55	
6	Havadar	34	14	13	7	45	35	+10	55	
7	Navad Urmia	34	13	13	8	24	20	+4	52	
8	Gol Reyhan Alborz	34	12	15	7	39	27	+12	51	
9	Esteghlal Khuzestan	34	13	9	12	35	25	+10	48	
10	Fajr Sepasi	34	11	12	11	34	32	+2	45	
11	Arman Gohar	34	10	13	11	40	42	−2	43	
12	Damash	34	11	9	14	27	35	−8	42	
13	Rayka Babol	34	8	13	13	31	33	−2	37	
14	Qashqai	34	9	10	15	33	38	−5	37	
15	Malavan	34	8	11	15	31	40	−9	35	
16	Nirooye Zamini (R)	34	8	9	17	32	46	−14	33	Relegation to 2nd Division
17	Sepidrood (R)	34	8	6	20	25	47	−22	30	Relegation to 2nd Division
18	Elmoadab Tabriz (R)	34	2	4	28	14	85	−71	10	Relegation to 2nd Division

Updated to match(es) played on 17 August 2020. Source: جدول دسته یک (98-99) – لیگ آزادگان 99-98, SOCCERWAY
(P) Promoted; (R) Relegated

== Results ==
Home \ Away	ALU	ARM	BAD	DAM	ELM	ESK	FJR	GRA	HVD	KTS	MLV	MES	MSR	NVD	NRZ	QSH	RYK	SPD
Aluminium Arak		1–2	1–0	1–0	7–0	1–0	3–1	1–1	2–0	2–1	1–0	0–0	2–2	1–0	1–2	2–0	1–0	0–0
Arman Gohar	1–1		2–2	3–0	3–2	2–0	4–0	2–3	0–0	0–0	2–1	2–2	1–1	2–0	0–0	1–1	2–1	2–1
Baadraan Tehran	0–1	4–0		2–1	3–0	0–1	3–1	1–2	2–2	1–0	1–0	1–2	0–2	2–0	2–1	4–3	1–1	1–0
Damash	0–0	1–0	2–0		2–0	1–0	1–1	2–1	3–0	0–1	0–0	0–0	1–3	0–0	2–1	2–1	2–1	2–1
Elmoadab Tabriz	1–1	0–3	0–3	0–3		1–1	1–0	1–1	1–3	0–3	1–1	0–3	0–3	1–2	0–3	0–1	0–3	0–2
Esteghlal Khuzestan	0–1	0–0	0–1	1–0	4–1		0–1	2–0	1–1	4–1	3–0	0–1	0–1	3–0	3–1	1–1	1–1	2–0
Fajr Sepasi	1–2	0–0	1–1	1–1	3–1	0–0		0–0	2–1	1–1	4–0	0–0	2–1	0–1	4–1	0–0	1–1	3–0
Gol Reyhan	0–0	3–0	1–1	3–0	5–0	0–0	2–0		0–0	2–1	1–1	1–1	1–1	0–0	1–0	1–0	0–0	1–0
Havadar	2–1	1–1	2–1	1–0	2–0	0–1	2–1	0–0		2–0	1–0	2–2	2–3	0–0	1–1	3–2	1–1	4–0
Khooshe Talaei Saveh	0–0	4–1	2–3	0–0	2–1	2–0	0–0	1–0	1–0		1–0	0–1	3–1	0–1	3–0	1–1	2–1	2–1
Malavan	1–0	1–1	2–0	1–1	7–0	1–2	2–0	0–1	1–1	2–3		0–0	1–0	0–0	3–2	1–1	0–1	2–1
Mes Kerman	0–1	1–0	2–1	3–0	3–0	1–0	0–1	2–0	2–4	0–0	3–1		0–0	0–0	2–1	1–0	1–0	1–0
Mes Rafsanjan	1–1	3–1	1–1	4–0	1–0	1–1	1–0	3–2	1–1	1–0	3–0	1–1		3–1	3–0	1–2	3–0	1–0
Navad Urmia	1–1	1–0	3–0	2–0	1–0	1–0	0–1	1–1	0–0	0–0	2–0	1–1	0–1		0–0	1–0	1–0	1–0
Nirooye Zamini	0–1	1–0	1–4	1–0	2–0	0–1	1–0	1–1	1–2	0–1	2–0	1–2	0–3	1–1		0–0	1–0	1–2
Qashqai	2–0	1–1	0–1	1–0	2–0	0–1	0–2	1–0	3–1	0–2	0–0	3–1	1–2	0–0	1–1		1–2	1–0
Rayka Babol	1–2	3–0	0–0	0–0	1–2	0–0	1–1	1–1	1–2	0–2	0–1	1–0	2–0	0–0	1–1	3–2		3–2
Sepidrood	0–0	2–1	1–3	1–0	1–0	3–2	0–1	1–2	0–1	0–4	1–1	1–3	0–0	1–0	1–1	2–1	0–0	

Updated to match(es) played on 2 August 2020. Source: Soccerway
Legend: Blue = home team win; Yellow = draw; Red = away team win.

== Statistics ==
=== Top scorers ===
Position	Player	Club	Goals
1	(Iran) Hamid Kazemi	Havadar	16
2	(Iran) Mehrdad Heydari	Rayka Babol	13
2	(Iran) Hamid Golzari	Mes Rafsanjan	13
4	(Iran) Ali Khodadadi	Nirooye Zamini	12

Updated to match(es) played on 23 September 2020.

== See also ==
- 2019–20 Persian Gulf Pro League
- 2019–20 2nd Division
- 2019-20 3rd Division
- 2019–20 Hazfi Cup
- 2019 Iranian Super Cup
