= Dariush Hormozi =

Iranian soccer coach

Personal information
- Full name: Dariush Hormozi
- Date of birth: August 16, 1975 (age 51)
- Place of birth: Ahvaz, Iran
- Height: 1.82 m (6 ft 0 in)
- Position: Defensive midfielder

Youth career
- 1979–1980: Hafari Ahvaz
- 1980–1981: Shahin Ahvaz

Senior career*
Years	Team	Apps	(Gls)
1981–1983	Jonoob Ahvaz	45	(4)

Managerial career
- 1994: Shahin Ahvaz
- 1994: Hafari Ahvaz
- 2005: Arvand Khorramshahr
- 2005: Esteghlal Mollasani
- 2007–2010: Esteghlal Ahvaz
- 2010–2011: Esteghlal Mollasani
- 2011–2013: Naft Omidiyeh
- 2013–2015: Foolad Nevin
- 2016–2020: Foolad U23
- 2020–2021: Qashqai
- 2021: Esteghlal Mollasani
- 2021–2022: Navad Urmia
- 2022–2023: Khalij Fars Mahshahr
- 2023–2024: Chooka Talesh
- * Club domestic league appearances and goals

Dariush Hormozi (Persian: داریوش هرمزی; born: August 16, 1975) is an Iranian former soccer player and soccer coach who works as a university lecturer in the field of physical education and serves as the head of the Khuzestan Coaches Association.

Dariush Hormozi holds a doctoral degree in physical education, and his alma mater was Shushtar Azad University.

== Honors ==
Naft Omidiyeh

- League 2 Runner-up: 2012

Foolad U23

- Iranian U23 League Runner-up: 2015
- Iranian U23 League: 2016

Esteghlal Mollasani

- Runner-up in League 2 and promotion to Azadegan League: 2021
