= 2020–21 Azadegan League =

30th season of Azadegan League

Azadegan League
- Season: 2020–21
- Champions: Fajr Sepasi
- Promoted: Fajr Sepasi; Havadar
- Relegated: Chooka; Navad; Gol Reyhan
- Goals: 612
- Top goalscorer: Aref Rostami (17 goals)
- Biggest home win: Sh. Astara 6-0 Gol Reyhan (12 July 2021)
- Biggest away win: Navad 1-5 Malavan (27 June 2021)
- Highest attendance: 0
- Lowest attendance: 0
- Total attendance: 0
- Average attendance: 0

The 2020–21 Azadegan League was the 30th season of the Azadegan League and 20th as the second highest division since its establishment in 1991. The season started on 2 November 2020 with 13 teams from the 2019–20 Azadegan League, two new teams relegated from the 2019–20 Persian Gulf Pro League: Pars Jonoubi Jam and Shahin Bushehr and three new teams promoted from the 2019–20 League 2: Chooka Talesh, Esteghlal Mollasani and Shahrdari Astara as champion, runner-up and third placed team respectively. Karoon Arvand Khorramshahr's 1st Division licence were taken back from Damash and then again sold to Kheybar Khorramabad. The league started on 22 November 2020 and ended on 19 July 2021. Fajr Sepasi Shiraz won the Azadegan League title for the first time in their history and was promoted to the Persian Gulf Pro League after an absence of eight years together with second-ranked Havadar Tehran. Kheybar Khorramabad's Aref Rostami was the top scorer with 17 goals.

== Teams ==
=== Stadia and locations ===
Locations of clubs

Team	Location	Stadium	Capacity
Arman Gohar Sirjan	Sirjan	Takhti Stadium	5,000
Baadraan Tehran	Tehran	Kargaran	5,000
Chooka Talesh	Rasht	Sardar Jangal	
Esteghlal Khuzestan	Ahvaz	Takhti	38,900
Esteghlal Mollasani	Ahvaz	Takhti	38,900
Fajr Sepasi	Shiraz	Pars	50,000
Gol Reyhan Alborz	Karaj	Enghelab	15,000
Havadar	Tehran	Shohadaye Eslamshar	8,250
Kheybar Khorramabad	Khorramabad	Takhti	
Khooshe Talaei Saveh	Saveh	Shahid Chamran	3,000
Malavan	Bandar-e Anzali	Takhti Anzali	8,000
Mes Kerman	Kerman	Shahid Bahonar	15,430
Navad Urmia	Urmia	Shahid Bakeri	15,000
Pars Jonoubi Jam	Jam	Takhti	
Qashqai	Shiraz	Pars	50,000
Rayka Babol	Babol	Haft-e Tir	6,000
Shahin Bushehr	Bushehr	Shahid Mahdavi	
Shahrdari Astara	Astara	Vahdat	

=== Number of teams by region ===
	Region	Number of teams	Teams
1	Gilan	3	Chooka, Malavan, Shahrdari Astara
2	Bushehr	2	Pars Jonoubi, Shahin
3	Fars	2	Fajr Sepasi, Qashqai
4	Kerman	2	Arman Gohar Sirjan, Mes Kerman
5	Khuzestan	2	Esteghlal Khuzestan, Esteghlal Molasani
6	Tehran	2	Baadraan, Havadar
7	Alborz	1	Gol Reyhan Alborz
8	Lorestan	1	Kheybar
9	Markazi	1	Khooshe Talaei Saveh
10	Mazandaran	1	Rayka Babol
11	West Azerbaijan	1	Navad Urmia

== League table ==
Pos	Team	Pld	W	D	L	GF	GA	GD	Pts	Promotion or relegation
1	Fajr Sepasi (C, P)	34	16	12	6	41	21	+20	60	Promotion to 2021–22 Persian Gulf Pro League
2	Havadar (P)	34	17	9	8	42	26	+16	60	Promotion to 2021–22 Persian Gulf Pro League
3	Baadraan Tehran	34	18	6	10	41	28	+13	60	
4	Mes Kerman	34	16	7	11	32	23	+9	55	
5	Shahin Bushehr	34	13	14	7	27	20	+7	53	
6	Esteghlal Khuzestan	34	13	13	8	31	20	+11	52	
7	Kheybar Khorramabad	34	12	13	9	45	26	+19	49	
8	Khooshe Talaei Saveh	34	12	13	9	34	27	+7	49	
9	Arman Gohar	34	14	7	13	47	44	+3	49	
10	Pars Jonoubi Jam	34	13	9	12	38	34	+4	48	
11	Malavan	34	12	10	12	30	30	0	46	
12	Rayka Babol	34	11	10	13	33	38	−5	43	
13	Esteghlal Mollasani	34	10	12	12	39	43	−4	42	
14	Qashqai	34	10	12	12	29	35	−6	42	
15	Shahrdari Astara	34	12	5	17	35	43	−8	41	
16	Chooka Talesh (R)	34	7	13	14	29	44	−15	34	Relegation to 2nd Division
17	Navad Urmia (R)	34	6	9	19	14	37	−23	27	Relegation to 2nd Division
18	Gol Reyhan Alborz (R)	34	4	6	24	25	74	−49	18	Relegation to 2nd Division

Updated to match(es) played on 19 July 2021. Source: Soccerway, persianleague.com
(C) Champions; (P) Promoted; (R) Relegated

== Results ==
Home \ Away	ARM	BAD	CHO	ESK	ESM	FJR	GRA	HVD	KHE	KTS	MLV	MES	NVD	PAR	QSH	RYK	SHA	SHR
Arman Gohar		0–0	3–0	2–0	2–2	1–2	3–1	2–1	1–0	1–0	2–1	1–0	4–1	0–3	1–1	3–3	2–1	2–0
Baadraan Tehran	2–0		0–0	0–0	2–1	0–1	2–1	0–2	1–0	1–1	3–0	2–1	1–0	1–0	1–3	3–1	0–0	1–0
Chooka Talesh	3–2	2–4		1–3	2–1	3–2	1–0	1–2	0–0	1–0	0–2	1–1	2–1	1–1	1–2	2–0	0–2	1–1
Esteghlal Khuzestan	1–0	1–0	0–0		3–1	0–0	3–0	1–1	1–1	0–0	0–0	0–1	3–1	0–0	0–0	2–3	0–0	2–1
Esteghlal Mollasani	3–3	1–1	0–0	1–4		1–1	1–0	1–1	0–1	1–2	0–0	1–0	1–0	2–1	1–1	1–0	1–1	1–0
Fajr Sepasi	2–1	1–2	2–0	0–0	2–1		0–0	1–1	1–1	1–1	2–0	0–1	1–0	0–0	2–2	2–0	3–0	3–1
Gol Reyhan	1–4	1–0	1–1	0–1	0–3	0–3		3–1	0–3	1–0	2–1	1–1	0–1	0–1	1–1	2–3	0–3	1–1
Havadar	2–0	1–2	1–0	1–0	2–1	1–2	4–1		1–0	1–3	2–0	0–0	3–0	3–2	2–0	2–1	0–1	1–0
Kheybar	2–1	1–0	3–0	0–0	0–1	0–0	5–0	0–1		1–1	2–2	0–2	3–0	3–1	5–1	3–1	0–1	1–2
Khooshe Talaei Saveh	3–0	2–0	2–1	1–2	2–1	0–0	4–1	0–0	2–2		2–0	0–0	1–0	1–1	1–0	1–1	0–1	2–1
Malavan	1–1	0–1	1–0	1–0	1–1	1–0	2–1	1–1	0–2	0–0		1–0	0–0	1–0	0–1	1–0	0–0	3–0
Mes Kerman	1–0	0–1	1–0	0–1	3–2	0–2	5–1	1–3	2–0	0–1	1–0		1–0	2–0	0–3	2–0	1–0	2–0
Navad Urmia	1–0	0–2	1–1	0–1	0–1	0–1	0–0	0–0	0–0	1–1	1–5	0–0		1–0	2–0	0–0	0–1	0–1
Pars Jonoubi	1–2	1–2	1–1	0–1	1–1	2–1	3–1	1–0	2–2	1–0	2–1	1–0	1–0		2–1	2–1	2–0	3–1
Qashqai	0–1	1–0	1–1	1–0	3–1	0–1	3–2	0–0	0–0	0–0	0–1	1–1	0–2	0–0		0–2	1–0	1–0
Rayka Babol	2–0	3–2	2–1	0–0	1–1	0–2	2–1	0–1	0–0	2–0	0–1	0–0	1–0	1–0	1–1		0–0	1–0
Shahin Bushehr	2–1	2–1	0–0	2–1	0–2	0–0	2–1	0–0	0–0	2–0	1–1	0–1	0–0	1–1	1–0	0–0		0–0
Shahrdari Astara	1–1	0–3	1–1	1–0	3–1	1–0	6–0	1–0	1–4	2–0	2–1	0–1	0–1	2–1	2–0	2–1	1–3	

Updated to match(es) played on 19 July 2021. Source: Soccerway iranleague.ir
Legend: Blue = home team win; Yellow = draw; Red = away team win.

=== Positions by round ===
Team ╲ Round	1	2	3	4	5	6	7	8	9	10	11	12	13	14	15	16	17	18	19	20	21	22	23	24	25	26	27	28	29	30	31	32	33	34
Fajr Sepasi Shiraz	6	15	8	4	8	5	7	7	4	5	6	3	4	3	3	4	5	5	2	3	4	4	6	4	4	6	4	4	3	4	3	1	1	1
Havadar	1	3	2	3	6	3	1	4	2	1	1	1	1	4	4	5	6	6	5	5	6	5	4	5	5	2	1	1	1	1	1	2	2	2
Baadraan Tehran	14	8	9	7	4	8	11	11	8	9	8	5	2	1	5	6	4	4	6	4	3	3	3	2	2	1	3	2	2	2	2	3	3	3
Mes Kerman	6	4	3	8	5	6	3	3	1	3	2	2	3	2	1	1	3	1	1	1	1	1	1	1	1	3	2	3	6	6	5	5	6	4
Shahin Bushehr	12	16	7	6	3	8	9	9	10	12	12	13	12	8	8	7	8	7	8	8	5	8	9	9	9	8	6	6	5	3	4	4	4	5
Esteghlal Khuzestan	4	2	3	2	1	2	4	1	3	2	3	4	6	6	6	3	2	3	3	2	2	2	2	3	3	5	8	8	8	7	7	6	5	6
Kheybar Khorramabad	1	6	12	11	11	12	12	12	9	11	11	12	11	13	14	14	13	14	13	10	9	6	5	8	6	4	7	7	7	8	8	9	9	7
Khooshe Talaei Saveh	6	13	16	17	17	17	17	16	14	14	14	14	10	12	9	11	10	11	11	12	11	11	7	6	7	7	5	5	4	5	6	7	7	8
Arman Gohar Sirjan	16	10	11	10	13	13	14	13	13	13	13	11	14	14	15	15	16	13	14	14	13	12	14	14	14	12	14	11	10	10	11	10	11	9
Pars Jonoubi Jam	1	1	1	1	2	1	2	5	7	4	5	6	7	7	7	8	7	8	9	9	10	7	8	7	8	9	9	9	9	9	10	11	8	10
Malavan	14	7	5	4	7	4	6	2	6	6	9	8	9	9	10	9	11	9	7	6	7	9	10	11	11	10	10	10	11	11	9	8	10	11
Rayka Babol	6	13	15	12	9	10	8	8	11	7	7	10	13	11	12	10	9	12	10	11	12	14	13	13	13	14	12	13	14	13	14	12	14	12
Esteghlal Mollasani	6	11	6	9	14	11	10	10	12	10	10	9	8	10	11	12	12	10	12	13	14	13	12	10	10	11	13	14	13	14	13	13	15	13
Qashqai	4	8	13	15	16	15	15	15	16	17	17	16	17	15	13	13	14	16	15	15	15	15	15	16	15	15	15	15	15	15	15	14	12	14
Shahrdari Astara	12	5	9	13	10	7	5	6	5	8	4	7	5	5	2	2	1	2	4	7	8	10	11	12	12	13	11	12	12	12	12	15	13	15
Chooka Talesh (R)	16	18	18	14	15	16	16	17	17	15	16	15	15	16	16	16	15	15	16	16	16	16	16	15	16	16	17	16	16	16	16	16	16	16
Navad Urmia (R)	16	17	17	18	18	18	18	18	18	18	18	18	18	18	17	18	18	17	17	17	17	17	17	17	17	17	16	17	17	17	17	17	17	17
Gol Reyhan Alborz (R)	6	12	14	16	12	14	13	14	15	16	15	17	16	17	18	17	17	18	18	18	18	18	18	18	18	18	18	18	18	18	18	18	18	18

Leader : Promotion to 2021-22 Persian Gulf Pro League
Promotion to 2021-22 Persian Gulf Pro League
Relegation to 2021-22 2nd Division

Updated to match(es) played on 19 July 2021. Source: Iran Football League Organization

== Statistics ==
=== Top scorers ===
Position	Player	Club	Goals
1	(Iran) Aref Rostami	Kheybar Khorramabad	17
2	(Iran) Ali Fateh	Pars Jonoubi Jam	13
3	(Iran) Hamid Kazemi	Baadraan Tehran	12
4	(Iran) Ali Abdoei	Esteghlal Mollasani	11

source: topscorers at the end of league dsport.ir

== See also ==
- 2020–21 Persian Gulf Pro League
- 2020–21 2nd Division
- 2020–21 3rd Division
- 2021 Hazfi Cup
- 2020 Iranian Super Cup
