= Roozbeh Shahalidoost =

Iranian footballer

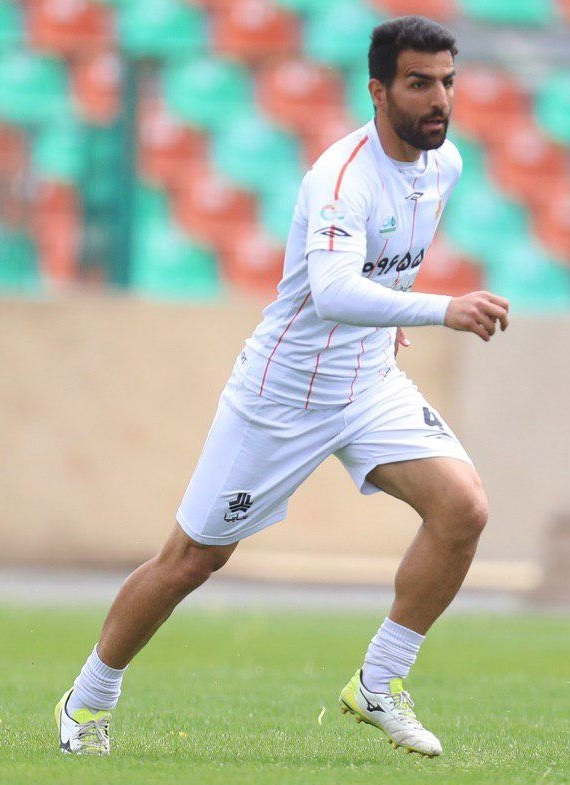

Personal information
- Date of birth: 21 May 1986 (age 40)
- Place of birth: Tehran, Iran
- Height: 1.81 m (5 ft 11 in)
- Position: Midfielder

Team information
- Current team: Saipa (assistant coach)

Youth career
- –2007: Fajr Sepah

Senior career*
Years	Team	Apps	(Gls)
2007–2009	Saipa	32	(1)
2009–2011	PAS Hamedan	60	(3)
2011–2020	Saipa	203	(8)
2020–2021	Nassaji	11	(0)
2021	Kheybar	12	(0)
2021–2022	Saipa	7	(0)
2023	Parsa Sanat		

Managerial career
- 2024–: Saipa (assistant)
- * Club domestic league appearances and goals

Roozbeh Shahalidoost (Persian: روزبه شاه علی دوست; born 21 May 1986) is an Iranian football coach and a former player. He is an assistant coach with Saipa.

== Club career ==
In 2009, Shahalidoost joined Pas Hamedan after spending the previous season at Saipa

Club performance			League		Cup		Continental		Total	
Season	Club	League	Apps	Goals	Apps	Goals	Apps	Goals	Apps	Goals
Iran			League		Hazfi Cup		Asia		Total	
2007–08	Saipa	Pro League	15	0	0	0	–		15	0
2008–09	Saipa	Pro League	17	1	0	0	–		17	1
2009–10	Pas; Hamedan	Pro League	30	2	0	0	–		30	2
2010–11	Pas; Hamedan	Pro League	30	1	1	0	–		31	1
2011–12	Saipa	Pro League	26	1	1	0	–		27	1
2012–13	Saipa	Pro League	22	1	1	0	–		23	1
2013–14	Saipa	Pro League	26	2	1	0	–		27	2
2014–15	Saipa	Pro League	15	2	0	0	–		15	2
2015–16	Saipa	Pro League	23	2	0	0	–		23	2
2016–17	Saipa	Pro League	22	2	0	0	–		22	2
2017–18	Saipa	Pro League	21	0	0	0	–		21	0
2018–19	Saipa	Pro League	4	0	0	0	–		4	0
2019–20	Saipa	Pro League	25	1	0	0	–		25	1
Career total			276	11	4	0	0	0	280	12

- Assists

Season	Team	Assists
2010–11	Pas	0
2011–12	Saipa	0
