= Shawheen Peiravani =

Iranian association football player

Personal information
- Full name: Shawheen Peiravani
- Date of birth: 8 August 1994 (age 32)
- Place of birth: Los Angeles, California
- Height: 1.75 m (5 ft 9 in)
- Position: Midfielder
- 2010-2012: F.C.Portland (Youth)

College career
Years	Team	Apps	(Gls)
2012	University of Tulsa		

Senior career*
Years	Team	Apps	(Gls)
2013	Springfield Demize		
2013-2017	Fajr Sepasi Shiraz F.C.		
2015-2016	→Rah Ahan Tehran F.C.		
2017-2019	Qashqai F.C.		
- * Club domestic league appearances and goals

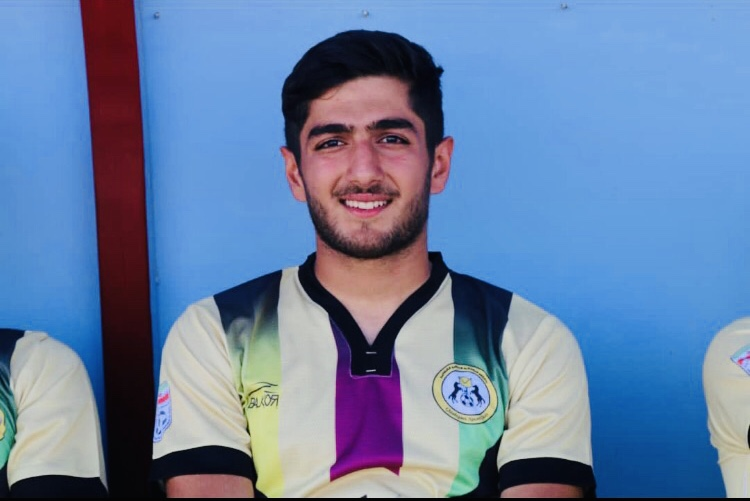
Shawheen Peiravani Qashqaei FC 2018

Shawheen Peiravani (born 8 August 1994) is a former Iranian professional footballer who played as a midfielder in the Persian Gulf Pro League. He has played for clubs such as Fajr Sepasi Shiraz F.C. Rah Ahan Tehran F.C. and Qashqai F.C.

== Career ==
Peiravani played collegiate soccer at the University of Tulsa, winning the Conference USA title in 2013. He started his professional career in Missouri, signing a 1-year deal with the Springfield Demize in the USL. Peiravani joined Fajr Sepasi Shiraz F.C. in 2015. He would go on to play for teams such as Rah Ahan Tehran F.C. and Qashqai F.C.

During his time at Qashqai F.C. He played under former Sporting CP player and Portuguese National Marco Almeida

== Personal life ==
Shawheen Peiravani is the nephew of former Professional Footballer Afshin Peiravani
