= Majid Tajik =

Iranian footballer (born 1997)

Personal information
- Date of birth: 8 March 1997 (age 29)
- Place of birth: Tehran, Iran
- Height: 1.65 m (5 ft 5 in)
- Position: Central midfielder

Team information
- Current team: Mes Shahr-e Babak
- Number: 8

Senior career*
Years	Team	Apps	(Gls)
2018	Esteghlal Tehran U21		
2018	Oghab Oxin		
2019	Gol Reyhan Alborz		
2019	Oghab Tehran	17	(1)
2021	Qashqai	30	(2)
2022	Fajr Sepasi	18	(0)
2023	Shahrdari Astara	15	(1)
2024	Naft Gachsaran	15	(0)
2024–	Mes Shahr-e Babak	63	(5)
- * Club domestic league appearances and goals as of 5 September 2026

Majid Tajik (born 8 March 1997) is an Iranian professional footballer who plays as a central midfielder for Mes Shahr-e Babak.

== Club career ==
Tajik was born in Tehran. He began his football career in the youth ranks of Esteghlal Tehran before playing for clubs including Gol Reyhan Alborz, Oghab Tehran, Qashqai Shiraz, Fajr Sepasi, Shahrdari Astara, and Naft Gachsaran. He joined Mes Shahr-e Babak in 2024.

He later started for Naft Gachsaran in its Hazfi Cup match against Persepolis.

== Mes Shahr-e Babak ==
Tajik joined Mes Shahr-e Babak in 2024 and was one of the club's players during the 2024–25 season in the Azadegan League. In November 2024, he scored in Mes Shahr-e Babak's match against Palayesh Naft Bandar Abbas.

Following Mes Shahr-e Babak's promotion to the Persian Gulf Pro League, Tajik told Mehr News Agency that promotion had been the team's objective from the beginning of the season and that continuing with Mes Shahr-e Babak was also his priority.

== Persian Gulf Pro League ==
Tajik has been included in the starting lineup of Mes Shahr-e Babak during the club's first season in the Persian Gulf Pro League.
