= Ashkan Najafpur =

Iranian CEO

- Born: Ruhollah Najafpur; April 25, 1979 (age 47); Shiraz, Iran
- Occupation: CEO

Ashkan Najafpour (Persian: اشکان نجف‌پور; born April 25, 1979) was the CEO of Qashqai Shiraz FC.

Ashkan Najafpour has a mixed heritage, with a Qashqai father and a Lur mother. He was admitted to the Political Science program at Farabi University as well as the Law program at Azad University, ultimately graduating with a bachelor's degree. He was later accepted into the master's program at Tehran International University, and in the same year, he founded Qashqai Shiraza FC, The club's license was transferred in 2022 to Chadormalou Ardakan S.C.
