= Aref Rostami =

Iranian footballer

Personal information
- Date of birth: 1 May 1996 (age 30)
- Place of birth: Tehran, Iran
- Height: 1.76 m (5 ft 9 in)
- Position: Forward

Team information
- Current team: Esteghlal Khuzestan
- Number: 7

Youth career
- 2015: Saipa
- 2015–2017: Moghavemat
- 2017–2018: Saipa

Senior career*
Years	Team	Apps	(Gls)
2018–2020	Nirooye Zamini	32	(8)
2020–2021	Kheybar Khorramabad	29	(17)
2021–2022	Zob Ahan	17	(2)
2022–2023	Mes Kerman	28	(8)
2023–2024	Tractor	7	(2)
2024–2025	Kheybar Khorramabad	13	(1)
2025	Nassaji	12	(0)
2025–	Esteghlal Khuzestan	32	(5)
- * Club domestic league appearances and goals as of 17 April 2025

Aref Rostami (Persian: عارف رستمی; born 1 May 1996) is an Iranian footballer who plays as a forward for Persian Gulf Pro League club Esteghlal Khuzestan.

== Club career ==
=== Kheybar Khorramabad ===
Rostami joined Kheybar Khorramabad in the summer of 2020. Rostami scored 17 times in 28 matches in 2020–21, and became the league's top scorer.

=== Zob Ahan ===
On 24 August 2021, He joined Zob Ahan on a one-year contract.

=== Mes Kerman ===
Rostami joined Mes Kerman in August 2022. He made his debut on 19 August 2022 against Paykan.

== Honours ==
Individual

- Azadegan League top scorer: 2020–21 (17 goals)
