= Mohammad Zeynali =

Iranian footballer

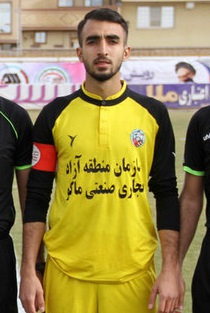

Personal information
- Full name: Mohammad Zeynali
- Date of birth: June 26, 1997 (age 29)
- Place of birth: Urmia, Iran
- Height: 1.83 m (6 ft 0 in)
- Positions: Defender; defensive midfielder

Team information
- Current team: Navad Urmia
- Number: 90

Youth career
- 2013–2017: Navad Urmia

Senior career*
Years	Team	Apps	(Gls)
2017–2019	Navad Urmia	27	(4)
2019–2023	Sepahan	0	(0)
2019–2020	→ Gol Gohar (loan)	4	(0)
2020–2021	→ Navad Urmia (loan)	32	(4)
2021–2023	→ Fajr Sepasi (loan)	25	(1)
2023–2024	Mes Soongoun	22	(0)
2024–	Navad Urmia	6	(1)
- * Club domestic league appearances and goals as of 4 November 2019

Mohammad Zeynali (Persian: محمد زینالی; born 26 June 1997) is an Iranian footballer who played as a defensive midfielder for Iranian club Sepahan in the Persian Gulf Pro League.
