= Saeed Ghaedifar =

Iranian footballer

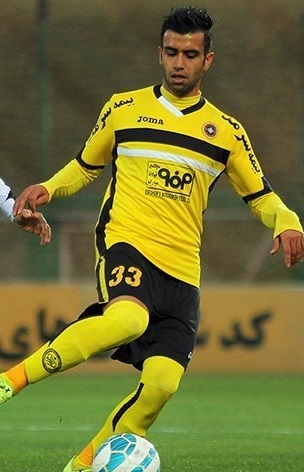

Personal information
- Date of birth: 13 April 1992 (age 34)
- Place of birth: Yasuj, Iran
- Height: 1.77 m (5 ft 10 in)
- Position: Left back

Youth career
- –2010: Naft va Gaz Gachsaran
- 2010–2013: Sepahan

Senior career*
Years	Team	Apps	(Gls)
2013–2016	Sepahan	23	(0)
2017	Machine Sazi	14	(0)
2017–2019	Fajr Sepasi	16	(0)
2019	Paykan	5	(0)
2020–2021	Arman Gohar	13	(4)
2021–2022	Van Pars		
2022	Arman Gohar		
2022–2023	Khooshe Talaee	2	(0)
2023	Arman Gohar	3	(0)
2024–2025	Paykan	0	(0)

International career
2008–2010	Iran U17	17	(2)
- * Club domestic league appearances and goals as of 1 January 2025

Saeed Ghaedifar (Persian: سعید قائدی فر; born 12 April 1992) is an Iranian football defender.

== Club career statistics ==
- Last Update: 1 August 2014

Club performance			League		Cup		Continental		Total	
Season	Club	League	Apps	Goals	Apps	Goals	Apps	Goals	Apps	Goals
Iran			League		Hazfi Cup		Asia		Total	
2014–15	Sepahan	Iran Pro League	1	0	0	0	0	0	1	0
Career total			1	0	0	0	0	0	1	0

== Honours ==
=== Club ===
Sepahan

- Iran Pro League (1): 2014–15
