= Mes Shahr-e Babak F.C. =

Iranian football club

Mes Shahr-e Babak
- Full name: Sanat Mes Shahr-e Babak Football Club
- Founded: 2010
- Ground: Shohada-ye Mes Shahr-e Babak Stadium
- Capacity: 15,000
- Owner: NICICO
- Chairman: Hossein Mahmoudi Meymand
- Manager: Mojtaba Hosseini
- League: Persian Gulf Pro League
- 2025–26: Azadegan League, 2nd
- Website: https://fc-mes-shahrbabak.ir/
Home colours	Away colours

Mes Shahr-e Babak Football Club is an Iranian football club based in Shahr-e Babak, Iran.

They competed in the 2010–11 Iran Football's 3rd Division, but could not advance to the second round. They finally got the 3rd place of Group 5.

They currently compete in the Azadegan League.

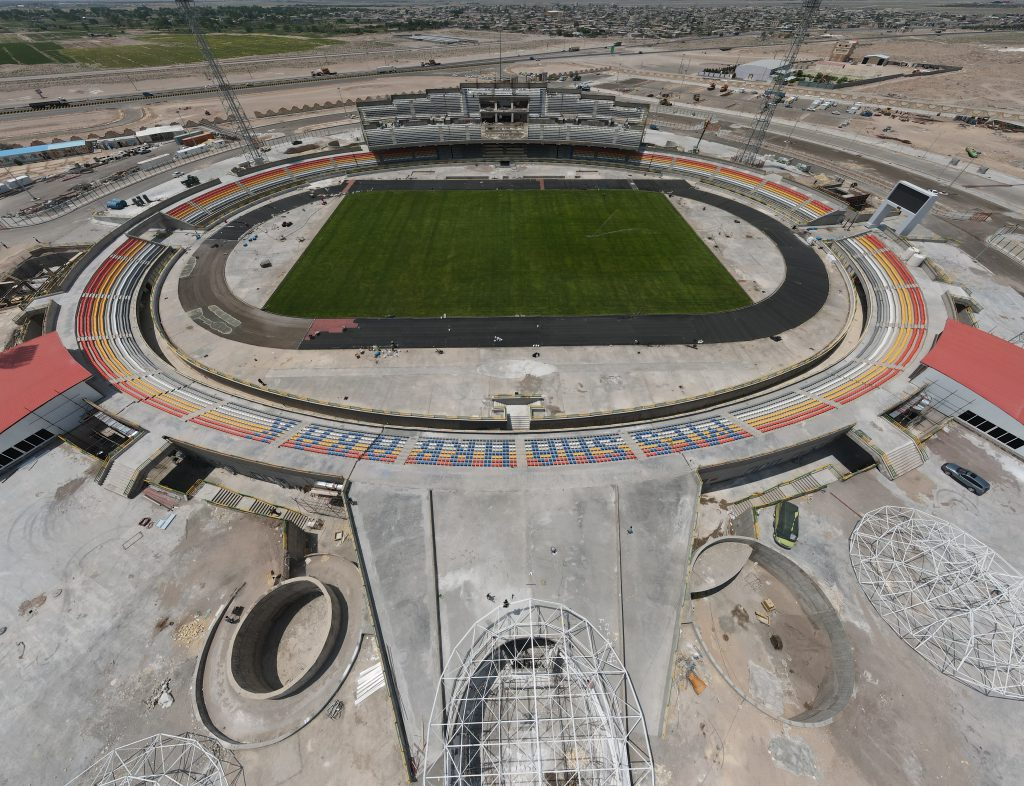
Mes shahrebabak stadiunm

== Season-by-season ==
The table below shows the achievements of the club in various competitions.

Season	League	Position	Hazfi Cup	Notes
2010–11	3rd Division	3rd/Group 5	Did not qualify
2011–12	3rd Division	5th/Group 5	Did not qualify
2012–13	3rd Division	7th/Group 8	Did not qualify	Relegation to the Provincial Leagues
2013–14	Provincial Leagues	—	Did not qualify
2014–15	Provincial Leagues	—	Did not qualify
2015–16	Provincial Leagues	—	Did not qualify
2016–17	Provincial Leagues	—	Did not qualify
2017–18	Provincial Leagues	—	Did not qualify	Replaced with Javan Novin Sari for 2018–19 2nd Division
2018–19	2nd Division	13th/Group B	Round of 32	Relegation to 2019–20 3rd Division; Replaced with Darayi Bandar Gaz for 2019–20 2nd Division
2019–20	2nd Division	3rd/Group B	Did not qualify
2020–21	2nd Division	1st/Group B	Second Round	Qualified to 2021–22 Azadegan League
2021–22	Azadegan League	7th	Round of 32

== Players ==
=== Current squads ===
As of 26 August 2026

==== First Team ====
Note: Flags indicate national team as defined under FIFA eligibility rules; some limited exceptions apply. Players may hold more than one non-FIFA nationality.

No.	Pos.	Nation	Player
1	GK	IRI	Aydin Ghavidel
2	DF	IRI	Mohsen Tarhani
3	DF	IRI	Mehdi Mohammadi
4	DF	IRI	Fariborz Gerami
5	MF	IRI	Alireza Enayatzadeh ^{U23} (on loan from Persepolis)
6	MF	IRI	Mohammad Reza Raoufimanesh
7	DF	IRI	Mohammad Javad Pouravaz (captain)
8	MF	IRI	Majid Tajik
9	FW	IRI	Amir Roostaei
10	FW	IRI	Alireza Valizadeh
13	GK	IRI	Mohammad Sadegh Naderpour
14	MF	IRI	Zobeir Niknafs
17	DF	IRI	Akbar Karbalaei
19	FW	IRI	Aref Ghezel ^{U25}

No.	Pos.	Nation	Player
21	DF	IRI	Mohammad Azhir
22	GK	IRI	Ali Rahimi Barfe
23	MF	IRI	Homayoun Eftekhari ^{U25}
36	MF	IRI	Mohammad Mehdi Jannia ^{U21} (on loan from Tractor)
37	MF	IRI	Mohammad Amin Vahabzadeh ^{U21}
40	MF	IRI	Sajjad Jafari
69	FW	IRI	Ali Jabbari
70	MF	IRI	Erfan Navabifar ^{U23}
71	DF	IRI	Pouria Gholami
77	DF	IRI	Mohsen Sefid Choghaei
79	MF	IRI	Omid Nafez
88	FW	IRI	Mojtaba Hasheminasab ^{U21} (on loan from Esteghlal)
89	FW	IRI	Mohammad Ali Abdollahi ^{U23}

- U21 = Under 21 year player. U23 = Under 23 year player. U25 = Under 25 year quota.

== Notes ==
- The club official website

== See also ==
- Hazfi Cup
- Iran Football's 3rd Division 2011–12
