= Mohammadreza Ghavidel =

Iranian footballer

Personal information
- Date of birth: 19 December 1993 (age 32)
- Place of birth: Astaneh-ye Ashrafiyeh, Gilan province, Iran
- Height: 1.84 m (6 ft 0 in)
- Position: Goalkeeper

Team information
- Current team: Mes Shahr Babak
- Number: 1

Youth career
- 2002–2014: Malavan

Senior career*
Years	Team	Apps	(Gls)
2014–2016	Malavan	2	(0)
2016–2017	Foolad Yazd	16	(0)
2017–2020	Aluminium Arak	39	(0)
2020–2021	Esteghlal Khuzestan	6	(0)
2021	Chooka Talesh	10	(0)
2021–2023	Arman Gohar	32	(0)
2023–	Mes Shahr Babak	59	(0)
- * Club domestic league appearances and goals as of 29 April 2025

Mohammadreza Ghavidel (Persian: محمدرضا قویدل; also known as Aydin Ghavidel; born 19 December 1993) is an Iranian professional football player who plays for Mes Shahr Babak in Azadegan League.

== Club career ==
=== Malavan ===
Mohammadreza has been in Malavan since he started playing football. He joined the main team in 2014. Malavan's coach that year was Dragan Skočić.

He has spent one year as soldier-football player in Malavan Novin.

=== National team ===
He was one of five goalkeepers on Iran's U 23 national team for 2016 Summer Olympics.
