= Mohammad Bakhtiari =

Iranian football Forward (born 1993)

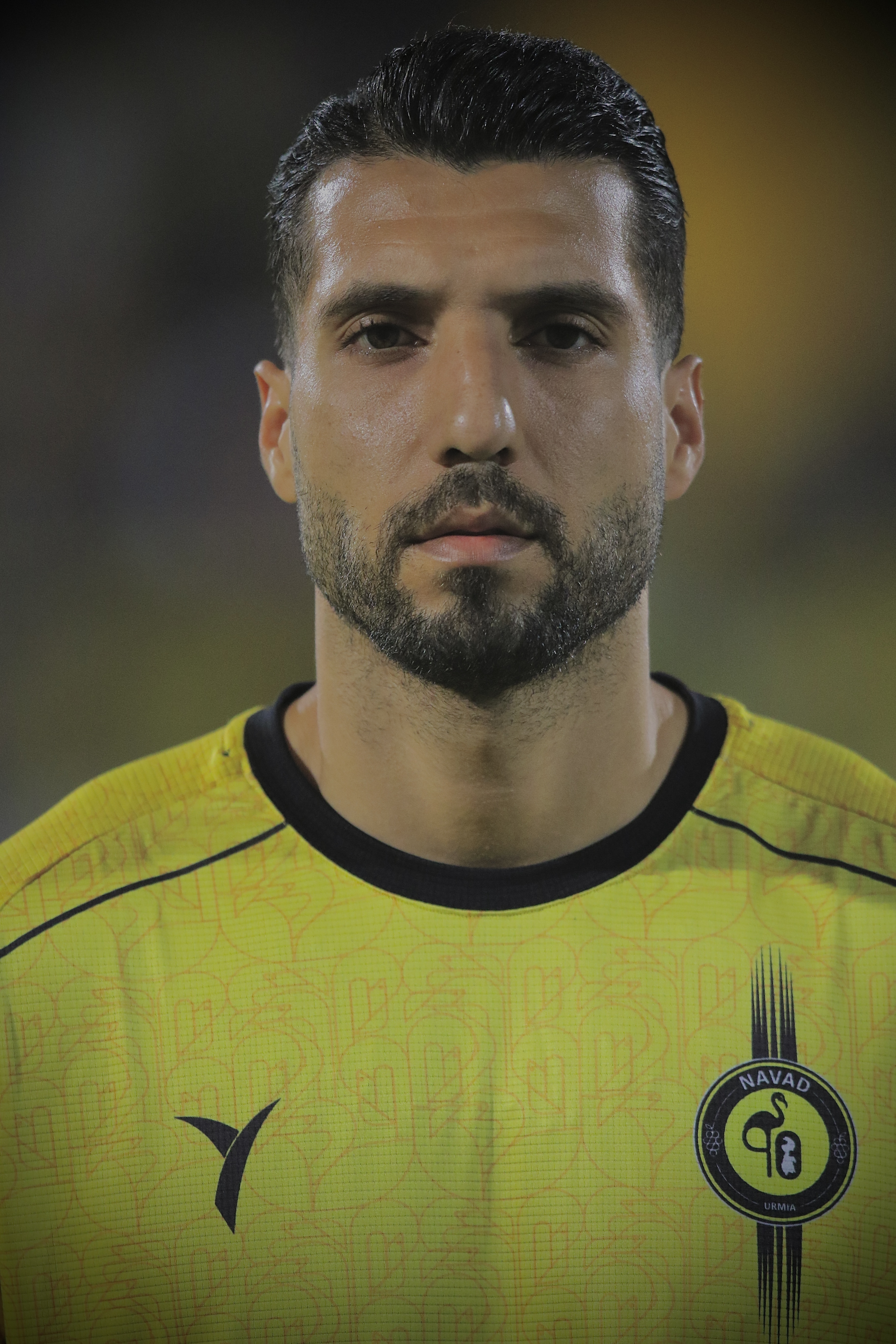
- Bakhtiari with Navad Urmia in 2025

Personal information
- Full name: Milad Bakhtiari
- Date of birth: 24 April 1993 (age 33)
- Place of birth: Gilan, Iran
- Height: 1.89 m (6 ft 2 in)
- Position: Forward

Team information
- Current team: Bargh Shiraz
- Number: 16

Youth career
- 2016–2017: Malavan

Senior career*
Years	Team	Apps	(Gls)
2016–2017	Malavan	11	(2)
2018–2019	Gilanmehr Fouman F.C.	7	(9)
2019–2020	Naft Gachsaran	5	(4)
2020–2021	Pars Jonoubi Jam	23	(1)
2021–2022	Shahrdari Mahshahr	7	(1)
2022–2023	Chooka Talesh	16	(3)
2023–2024	Ario Eslamshahr	15	(6)
2024–2025	Pars Jonoubi Jam	3	(1)
2024–2025	Foolad Hormozgan	2	(2)
2025–2026	Navad Urmia	12	(2)
2025–2026	Bargh Shiraz	6	(0)
- * Club domestic league appearances and goals

Mohammad Bakhtiari (Persian: محمد بختیاری; born 24 April 1993 in Gilan, Iran) is an Iranian footballer who plays as a forward. As of 2026, he plays for Bargh Shiraz F.C.
