= 2021–22 League 2 (Iran) =

Iran Football's 2nd Division
- Season: 2021–22
- Champions: Chooka Talesh
- Promoted: Chooka Talesh; Shahin Bandar Ameri; Van Pars Naghshe Jahan
- Relegated: Abi Poushan Tehran; Iranjavan Bushehr; Oghab Tehran; Gol Reyhan Alborz

The 2021–22 season of Iran Football's 2nd Division was the 21st under 2nd Division since its establishment (current format) in 2001. The season featured 21 teams from the 2nd Division 2020–21, three new team relegated from the 2020–21 Azadegan League: Chooka Talesh, Navad Urmia, Gol Reyhan Alborz, and four new teams promoted from the 3rd Division 2020–21: Shahrdari Noshahr, Shahid Oraki Eslamshahr, Van Pars Naghsh-e-Jahan, Shohadaye Razakan Karaj. The draw for the league was held on 26 October 2021.
These changes has been applied before the season:

Team	Replaced team
Omid Genaveh	Payam Toos Khorasan
Milad Mehr Iranian	Iman Sabz Shiraz
Melli Haffari Ahvaz	Naft va Gaz Gachsaran
Elmo Adab Tabriz	Besat Kermanshah
Mohtasham Tabriz	Khalij Fars Mahshahr

== Teams ==
=== Stadia and locations ===
Locations of clubs in 2021–22 Iran Football's 2nd Division

=== Number of teams by region ===
	Region	Number of teams	Teams
1	Tehran	5	Abipooshan Omid Kousha, Espad Alvand, Shahid Oraki Eslamshahr, Oghab, Nirooye Zamini
2	Khuzestan	3	Foolad Novin, Shahrdari Mahshahr, Khalij Fars Mahshahr
3	Bushehr	2	Iranjavan, Shahin Bandar Ameri
4	Alborz	2	Gol Reyhan, Shohadaye Razakan
5	Gilan	2	Chooka Talesh, Sepidrood Rasht
6	Kerman	2	Mes Novin, Shahrdari Bam
7	Kermanshah	2	Besat
8	Mazandaran	2	Shahrdari Noshahr, Shohadaye Babolsar
9	Isfahan	1	Van Pars Naghsh-e-Jahan
10	Hamedan	1	Pas
11	Hormozgan	1	Shahrdari Bandar Abbas
12	Kohgiluyeh and Boyer-Ahmad	1	Naft va Gaz Gachsaran
13	North Khorasan	1	Atrak Bojnourd
14	Fars	1	Iman Sabz Shiraz
15	West Azerbaijan	1	Navad Urumia
16	Yazd	1	Shahid Ghandi Yazd
17	Razavi Khorasan	1	Payam Toos Khorasan

== League table ==
=== Group A ===
Pos	Team	Pld	W	D	L	GF	GA	GD	Pts	Promotion or relegation
1	Chooka Talesh (C, P)	26	16	6	4	33	16	+17	54	2022–23 Azadegan League & final match
2	Sh. Bandar Abbas	26	14	8	4	36	17	+19	50	Play-off round
3	Shohadaye Razakan Karaj	26	12	10	4	25	15	+10	46	
4	Shahid Oraki Eslamshahr	26	11	11	4	32	12	+20	44	
5	Shahrdari Mahshahr	26	12	6	8	32	25	+7	42	
6	Nirooye Zamini Tehran	26	11	9	6	23	23	0	42	
7	Sepidrood Rasht	26	8	10	8	23	22	+1	34	
8	Shohadaye Babolsar	26	9	5	12	22	27	−5	32	
9	Payam Toos Khorasan	26	7	8	11	21	26	−5	29	
10	Manategh Naftkhiz Jonoub	26	6	11	9	24	25	−1	29	
11	Shahrdari Bam	26	7	7	12	19	23	−4	28	
12	Be'sat Kermanshah	26	6	9	11	25	31	−6	27	
13	Abi Poushan Tehran (R)	26	5	9	12	19	25	−6	24	Relegation to 2022–23 3rd Division 2nd Stage
14	Iranjavan Bushehr (R)	26	1	5	20	11	58	−47	8	Relegation to 2022–23 3rd Division 2nd Stage

Updated to match(es) played on 1 June 2022. Source: iranleague, Dsport
Rules for classification: 1) Points; 2) Head-to-head points; 3) Head-to-head goal difference; 4) Head-to-head goals scored; 5) Goal difference; 6) Goals scored; 7) Play-off at neutral venue.
(Note: Head-to-head record is used only after all the matches between the teams in question have been played).
(C) Champions; (P) Promoted; (R) Relegated

=== Group B ===
Pos	Team	Pld	W	D	L	GF	GA	GD	Pts	Promotion or relegation
1	Shahin Bandar Ameri (P)	26	16	6	4	42	22	+20	54	2022–23 Azadegan League & final match
2	Van Pars Naghshe Jahan (P)	26	12	11	3	32	16	+16	47	Play-off round
3	Shahid Ghandi Yazd	26	12	8	6	33	21	+12	44	
4	Foolad Novin Ahvaz	26	11	10	5	24	9	+15	43	
5	Navad Urmia	25	10	9	6	26	21	+5	39	
6	Khalij Fars Mahshahr	25	10	8	7	27	18	+9	38	
7	Spad Tehran	26	10	6	10	27	29	−2	36	
8	Mes Novin Kerman	26	9	8	9	26	23	+3	35	
9	Atrak Bojnourd	26	10	4	12	26	27	−1	34	
10	Iman Sabz Shiraz	26	8	8	10	16	18	−2	32	
11	Shahrdari Noshahr	26	8	7	11	25	24	+1	31	
12	Pas Hamedan	26	7	8	11	31	35	−4	29	
13	Oghab Tehran (R)	26	5	9	12	17	26	−9	24	Relegation to 2022–23 3rd Division 2nd Stage
14	Gol Reyhan Alborz (R)	26	1	2	23	5	68	−63	5	Relegation to 2022–23 3rd Division 1st Stage

Updated to match(es) played on 21 June 2022. Source: iranleague, Dsport
Rules for classification: 1) Points; 2) Head-to-head points; 3) Head-to-head goal difference; 4) Head-to-head goals scored; 5) Goal difference; 6) Goals scored; 7) Play-off at neutral venue.
(Note: Head-to-head record is used only after all the matches between the teams in question have been played).
(P) Promoted; (R) Relegated

== 2nd Division play-off ==
Team 1	Agg.	Team 2	1st leg	2nd leg
Van Pars Naghshe Jahan	3–2	Sh. Bandar Abbas	1–0	2–2

=== Leg 1 ===
28 June 2022
20:00

Van Pars Naghshe Jahan	1-0	Sh. Bandar Abbas
Hossein Fallahian 52'

Foolad Shahr Stadium, Isfahan

=== Leg 2 ===
4 July 2022
20:30

Sh. Bandar Abbas	2-2	Van Pars Naghshe Jahan

Khalij-e Fars Stadium, Bandar Abbas

Source=

Van Pars Naghshe Jahan won 3–2 on aggregate and promoted to 2022-23 Azadegan league

== 2nd Division Final ==
Team 1	Score	Team 2
Shahin Bandar Ameri	1-2	Chooka Talesh

=== Single Match ===
1 July 2022
19:50

Shahin Bandar Ameri	1-2	Chooka Talesh
Nasrollah Derafshi 85' (pen.)		Seyedali Yahyazadeh 61'; Hossein Heydari 90+1'

Yadegar Emam, Qom
Referee: Farhad Ghasemi
