= Saeid Gholamalibeigi =

Association football player

Personal information
- Date of birth: 4 September 1993 (age 33)
- Place of birth: Arak, Iran
- Height: 1.81 m (5 ft 11 1/2 in)
- Positions: Right back; defensive midfielder

Team information
- Current team: Havadar
- Number: 5

Youth career
- 2012–2013: Esteghlal
- 2013–2014: Naft Tehran
- 2014–2015: Aluminium Arak
- 2015–2017: Nirooye Zamini

Senior career*
Years	Team	Apps	(Gls)
2017–2018	Naft Masjed Soleyman	26	(1)
2018–2019	Shahin Bushehr	6	(0)
2019–2020	Saipa	10	(0)
2020–2024	Nassaji	107	(2)
2024–2025	Paykan	9	(0)
2025–	Havadar	7	(0)
- * Club domestic league appearances and goals as of 21 April 2025

Saeid Gholamalibeigi (Persian: سعید غلامعلی بیگی; born 4 September 1993) is an Iranian footballer who plays as a defender for Persian Gulf Pro League club Havadar.

== Career statistics ==
=== Club ===
Club	Season	League			Cup		Continental		Total	
Club	Season	League	Apps	Goals	Apps	Goals	Apps	Goals	Apps	Goals
Naft Masjed Soleyman	2017-18	Azadegan League	26	1	2	0	0	0	28	1
Shahin	2018-19	Azadegan League	6	0	1	0	0	0	7	0
Saipa	2019-20	Persian Gulf Pro League	10	0	1	0	0	0	11	0
Nassaji	2020-21	Persian Gulf Pro League	29	1	2	0	0	0	31	1
Nassaji	2021-22	Persian Gulf Pro League	24	1	4	0	0	0	28	1
Nassaji	2022-23	Persian Gulf Pro League	26	0	3	0	0	0	29	0
Nassaji	2023-24	Persian Gulf Pro League	17	0	1	0	5	0	23	0
Nassaji	Total		96	2	10	0	5	0	111	2
Career Total			138	3	14	0	5	0	157	3

== Club career ==
=== Nassaji ===
He made his debut for Nassaji Mazandaran in first fixture of 2020–21 Persian Gulf Pro League against Aluminium Arak.

== Honours ==
Nassaji

- Hazfi Cup: 2021–22
