= Hamid Kazemi =

Iranian footballer (born 1988)

Agha Hamid Kazemi
Personal information
- Full name: Hamid Kazemi
- Date of birth: December 6, 1988 (age 37)
- Place of birth: Iran
- Height: 1.90 m (6 ft 3 in)
- Position: Forward

Team information
- Current team: Havadar

Senior career*
Years	Team	Apps	(Gls)
2005–2007	Paykan	2	(0)
2007–2008	Shirin Faraz	19	(0)
2008–2010	Mehrkam Pars	50	(7)
2010–2011	Pas Hamedan	28	(4)
2011–2012	Steel Azin	21	(11)
2012–2013	Mes Kerman	8	(1)
2013–2015	Giti Pasand	41	(9)
2015–2016	Nassaji Mazandaran	31	(16)
2016–2018	Khooneh Be Khooneh		(15)
2018	Baadraan		
2018–2019	Mes Kerman		(6)
2019–2021	Havadar Tehran		(24)
- * Club domestic league appearances and goals as of 15 November 2014

Hamid Kazemi (Persian: حمید کاظمی) is an Iranian footballer who plays for Baadraan in Azadegan League as a forward.

== Club career ==
Kazemi joined Pas Hamedan in 2010 after spending the previous season at Mehrkam Pars F.C. in the Azadegan League.

Club performance			League		Cup		Total	
Season	Club	League	Apps	Goals	Apps	Goals	Apps	Goals
Iran			League		Hazfi Cup		Total	
2006–07	Paykan	Pro League	2	0				
2007–08	Shirin Faraz	Pro League	19	0				
2008–09	Mehrkam Pars	Division 1	24	3				
2009–10	Mehrkam Pars	Division 1	26	4				
2010–11	Pas Hamedan	Pro League	28	4	1	0	29	4
2011–12	Steel Azin	Division 1	21	11				
2012–13	Mes Kerman	Pro League	1	0	0	0	1	0
Career total			122	22				

- Assists

Season	Team	Assists
2010–11	Pas Hamedan	1

== Honors ==
=== Individual ===
2019–20 Azadegan League Top Scorer
