= Parsa Sanat Birjand F.C. =

Iranian football club

Parsa Sanat Shargh Birjand F.C.
- Founded: 2021
- Chairman: Saeed Mehmanparast
- Head Coach: Mostafa Mahdavikia
- League: 3rd Division
- 2021–22: Second Round 4th

Parsa Sanat Shargh Birjand Football Club (Persian: باشگاه فوتبال پارسا صنعت شرق بیرجند) is an Iranian association football club based in Birjand.
