= Khalij Fars Mahshahr S.C. =

Iranian football club

Khalij Fars Mahshahr S.C. خلیج فارس ماهشهر
- Full name: Khalij Fars Bandare Mahshahr Sport Club
- Ground: Sohada Sport Complex
- Capacity: 5,000
- Chairman: Ayoub Askari
- League: League 2
- 2021-22: League 2, 7th

Khalij Fars Mahshahr Sport Club (Persian: باشگاه ورزشی خلیج فارس ماهشهر, Bashgah-e Varzeshi-e Xalij-e Fârs-e Mahshahr) is a professional football club based in Mahshahr, Khuzestan, Iran actually playing in the third tier League 2.

== Hazfi Cup ==
In one of the matches of 2021-22 Hazfi Cup round of 32, the Khalij Fars Mahshahr team scored the first matches and at home with one goal, defeated Havadar team and reached the top 16 teams. They managed to reach the hazfi Cup semi final.
