= Bagher Niari =

Iranian footballer

Personal information
- Full name: Bagher Niari Sham Asbi
- Date of birth: 19 February 1998 (age 28)
- Place of birth: Tehran, Iran
- Position: Winger

Youth career
- 2008–: Saipa

Senior career*
Years	Team	Apps	(Gls)
2015–	Saipa	3	(0)
2018–	Nassaji	1	(0)

International career
2014–	Iran U17	7	(1)
- * Club domestic league appearances and goals as of 15 May 2015

Bagher Niari (Persian: باقر نیاری); is an Iranian Football forward who currently played for Iranian football club Nassaji in the Iran Pro League.

== Club career ==
=== Saipa ===
He started his career with Saipa from youth levels. As winter 2015 he joined to first team by Majid Jalali. He made his debut for Saipa on 19 February 2015 against Foolad as a substitute for Hadi Rekabi.

== Club career statistics ==
As of 15 May 2015.

Club	Division	Season	League		Hazfi Cup		Asia		Total	
Club	Division	Season	Apps	Goals	Apps	Goals	Apps	Goals	Apps	Goals
Saipa	Pro League	2014–15	3	0	0	0	–	–	3	0
Career Totals			3	0	0	0	0	0	3	0

== International career ==
=== U17 ===
He was part of Iran U–17 in 2014 AFC U-16 Championship.
