= Arman Gohar Sirjan F.C. =

Iranian association football club

Arman Gohar
- Full name: Arman Gohar Sirjan Football Club
- Founded: 2016, 5 years ago
- Ground: Takhti Stadium; Sirjan
- Capacity: 5,000
- Chairman: Arman Gohar Co.
- Manager: Ghasem Shahpa
- League: Azadegan League
- 2020–21: Azadegan League, 9th
Home colours

Arman Gohar Sirjan Football Club (Persian: باشگاه فوتبال آرمان گهر سیرجان, Bashgah-e Futbal-e Ârman Gâher Sirjan) is an Iranian football club based in Sirjan, Iran who compete in Azadegan League.

The club was founded in 2016 as Jahad Nasr Sirjan Football Club. The club is owned and supported by Arman Gohar Sirjan company.

== Players ==
=== First team squad ===
Note: Flags indicate national team as defined under FIFA eligibility rules; some limited exceptions apply. Players may hold more than one non-FIFA nationality.

No.	Pos.	Nation	Player
2	DF	(Iran) IRN	Milad Sadeghian
3	DF	(Iran) IRN	Hadi Chahar Miri^{U23}
4	DF	(Iran) IRN	Amin Abbasi
6	MF	(Iran) IRN	Jafar Barzegar
10	FW	(Iran) IRN	Abbas Pourkhosravani
12	FW	(Iran) IRN	Ali Nazari
13	MF	(Iran) IRN	Shahin Shafiei
14	DF	(Iran) IRN	Arman Akvan
16	MF	(Iran) IRN	Hossein Paymard^{U25}
17	FW	(Iran) IRN	Ali Vazziri
20	DF	(Iran) IRN	Ali Shahsavari Pour^{U25}
21	DF	(Iran) IRN	Bahman Kamel
24	MF	(Iran) IRN	Ali Dehghan
30	MF	(Iran) IRN	Mohammad Mahdi Yar Ahmadi
31	GK	(Iran) IRN	Hossein Nosrat Abadi
33	DF	(Iran) IRN	Saeed Ghaedifar
37	DF	(Iran) IRN	Hasan Hajeb^{U25}

No.	Pos.	Nation	Player
45	GK	(Iran) IRN	Vahid Sheikhveisi
70	FW	(Iran) IRN	Amir Mahmoud Abadi
73	FW	(Iran) IRN	Reza Pourmahdi Abadi
77	FW	(Iran) IRN	Majid Khajavi Nejad^{U25}
80	FW	(Iran) IRN	Sajjad Hesami
88	MF	(Iran) IRN	Amir Reza Mirzaei^{U23}
—	FW	(Iran) IRN	Abolfazl Shahsavari^{U25}
—	FW	(Iran) IRN	Ali Ghorbankhani
—	DF	(Iran) IRN	Mohammadreza Ahmadi^{U23}
—	GK	(Iran) IRN	Mohammadreza Ghavidel
—	MF	(Iran) IRN	Reza Dehghan
—	FW	(Iran) IRN	Sajad Mousavi
—	FW	(Iran) IRN	Bagher Niari

== See also ==
- Hazfi Cup
- 2018–19 Iran Football's 2nd Division
