= Majid Rezaei =

Iranian footballer

Personal information
- Full name: Majid Rezaei
- Place of birth: Iran
- Position: Goalkeeper

Senior career*
Years	Team	Apps	(Gls)
1984–1988	Esteghlal		

International career
1986–1988	Iran	3	(0)
- * Club domestic league appearances and goals

Majid Rezaei (Persian: مجید رضایی) is a retired Iranian goalkeeper who played for Iran national football team in 1986 Asian Games. He was formerly playing for Esteghlal Tehran and Iran national football team.
