= Pouria Gholami =

Iranian footballer (born 1994)

Personal information
- Full name: Pouria Gholami
- Date of birth: September 20, 1994 (age 32)
- Place of birth: Sari, Iran
- Height: 1.76 m (5 ft 9 in)
- Position: Right back

Team information
- Current team: Mes Shahr-e Babak
- Number: 71

Senior career*
Years	Team	Apps	(Gls)
2014	Khooneh Be Khooneh		
2016–2019	Malavan	83	(6)
2019–2020	Mes Kerman	22	(1)
2020–2021	Khooshe Talaei	33	(0)
2021–2022	Malavan	26	(2)
2022–2023	Kheybar Khorramabad	6	(0)
2022–2023	Shams Azar	3	(0)
2023–2024	Mes Kerman	31	(2)
2024–	Mes Shahr-e Babak	70	(0)
- * Club domestic league appearances and goals as of 28 April 2024

Pouria Gholami (Persian: پوریا غلامی; born September 20, 1994) is an Iranian footballer who plays as a defender for Iranian club Mes Shahr-e Babak in the Persian Gulf Pro League.

== Club career ==
Gholami has played for Khaybar Khorramabad, Khoshe Talaii, and Malavan Bandar Anzali.
