= 2019–20 League 2 (Iran) =

Iran Football's 2nd Division
- Season: 2019–20
- Champions: Chooka Talesh
- Promoted: Chooka Talesh; Esteghlal Molasani; Shahrdari Astara
- Relegated: Be'sat Kermanshah; Shohadaye Razakan Karaj; Sh. Fouman; Karoon Khoramshahr

The 2019–20 Iran Football's 2nd Division season was the 19th under 2nd Division since its establishment (current format) in 2001. The season featured 21 teams from the 2nd Division 2018–19, one new team relegated from the 2018–19 Azadegan League: Shahrdari Mahshahr, and six new teams promoted from the 3rd Division 2018–19: Shahrdari Astara, Melli Haffari Ahvaz, Esteghlal Molasani, Milad Mehr Iranian Tehran, Darayi Bandar Gaz, Shohadaye Razakan Karaj.

After concerns about COVID-19 pandemic in Iran, the season was suspended on 1 March 2020.

== Teams ==
These changes took effect before the season commenced:

Team	Replaced Team	League
Damash Gilanian	Karoon Arvand Khorramshahr	Azadegan League
Moghavemat Tehran	Atrak Bojnourd	-
Esteghlal Ramshir	Shahid Ghandi Yazd	-
Darayi Bandar Gaz	Mes Shahr Babak	3rd Division 2nd Stage

=== Stadia and locations ===
Locations of clubs in 2019–20 Iran Football's 2nd Division

== League table ==
=== Group A ===
Pos	Team	Pld	W	D	L	GF	GA	GD	Pts	Promotion or relegation
1	Esteghlal Molasani	26	15	7	4	40	12	+28	52	2020–21 Azadegan League
2	Sh. Astara	26	15	7	4	49	26	+23	52	Playoff round
3	Foolad B	26	15	6	5	48	24	+24	51	
4	Kheibar Khoramabad	26	13	10	3	36	13	+23	49	
5	Shahid Ghandi Yazd	26	11	10	5	37	21	+16	43	
6	Sh. Hamedan	26	10	8	8	34	24	+10	38	
7	Mes Novin Kerman	26	9	9	8	30	24	+6	36	
8	Milad Mehr Iranian	26	8	11	7	37	36	+1	35	
9	Ettehad (Avalan) Kamyaran	26	8	9	9	27	29	−2	33	
10	Caspian Qazvin	26	8	6	12	32	34	−2	30	
11	Atrak Bojnourd	26	7	8	11	28	32	−4	29	
12	Omid Ganaveh	26	5	10	11	23	31	−8	25	
13	Sh. Fouman	26	2	4	20	24	83	−59	10	Relegation to 2020–21 3rd Division 2nd Stage
14	Karoon Khoramshahr	26	3	1	22	11	67	−56	10	Relegation to 2020–21 3rd Division 1st Stage

Updated to match(es) played on 23 August 2020. Source: Dsport
Rules for classification: 1) points; 2) goal difference; 3) number of goals scored; 4) Head-to-Head Matches (With away goal rule applied); if still tied and teams are not in promotion or relegation situation or season would not finished, team will share the place; if not: 5) Play-off match at a neutral venue.

=== Group B ===
Pos	Team	Pld	W	D	L	GF	GA	GD	Pts	Promotion or relegation
1	Chooka Talesh	26	13	10	3	35	22	+13	49	2020–21 Azadegan League
2	Pas Hamedan	26	12	10	4	34	23	+11	46	Playoff round
3	Mes Shahr Babak	26	10	11	5	30	17	+13	41	
4	Sh. Mahshahr	26	8	12	6	30	23	+7	36	
5	Sh. Bandar Abbas	26	9	7	10	33	38	−5	34	
6	Naft Omidiyeh	26	10	4	12	22	28	−6	34	
7	Naft va Gaz Gachsaran	26	8	9	9	28	29	−1	33	
8	Shahrdari Bam	26	7	12	7	31	33	−2	33	
9	Shohadaye Babolsar	26	7	10	9	41	40	+1	31	
10	Melli Haffari Ahvaz	26	8	7	11	23	28	−5	31	
11	Sardar Bukan	26	7	9	10	24	30	−6	30	
12	Iranjavan Bushehr	26	7	8	11	22	26	−4	29	
13	Shohadaye Razakan Karaj	26	6	10	10	18	26	−8	28	Relegation to 2020–21 3rd Division 2nd Stage
14	Be'sat Kermanshah	26	6	9	11	24	32	−8	27	Relegation to 2020–21 3rd Division 2nd Stage

Updated to match(es) played on 21 August 2020. Source: Dsport
Rules for classification: 1) points; 2) goal difference; 3) number of goals scored; 4) Head-to-Head Matches (With away goal rule applied); if still tied and teams are not in promotion or relegation situation or season would not finished, team will share the place; if not: 5) Play-off match at a neutral venue.

== 2nd Division Play-off ==
Team 1	Agg.	Team 2	1st leg	2nd leg
Shahrdari Astara	1-1; 4-3 (p)	Pas Hamedan	0-1	1-0

=== Leg 1 ===
20 September 2020

Shahrdari Astara	0-1	Pas Hamedan
		Hamid Heydari 15'

Takhti Anzali
Attendance: 0 (Note: The remainder of the competition, held after July 2020, will be played behind closed doors due to the COVID-19 pandemic in Iran.)

=== Leg 2 ===
27 September 2020

Pas Hamedan	0-1	Shahrdari Astara
		Amin Haghdeh 53' (pen.)
Penalties
	3-4

Haji Babayi Hamedan
Attendance: 0

source=

== 2nd Division Final ==
Team 1	Score	Team 2
Esteghlal Molasani	0-1	Chooka Talesh

=== Leg 1 ===
22 September 2020
17:30

Esteghlal Molasani	0–1	Chooka Talesh
		Saman Noor Mohammadi 87'

Pas Ghavamin Tehran
Attendance: 0
Referee: Rasoul Oliyayi
