= Jafar Barzegar =

Iranian footballer

Personal information
- Full name: Jafar Barzegar
- Date of birth: 25 April 1993 (age 33)
- Place of birth: Ardabil, Iran
- Height: 1.80 m (5 ft 11 in)
- Position: Defender

Team information
- Current team: Shams Azar F.C.
- Number: 2

Senior career*
Years	Team	Apps	(Gls)
2020-2021	Machine Sazi F.C.	5	(0)
2022	Shams Azar F.C.	19	(0)
Total		24	

International career^{‡}
2017–18	Iran U-17	4	(0)
20219	Iran U-23	5	(0)
- * Club domestic league appearances and goals as of 01:42, 18 October 2023 (UTC) ‡ National team caps and goals as of 01:42, 18 October 2023 (UTC)

Jafar Barzegar (Persian: جعفر برزگر; born 25 April 1993) is an Iranian footballer who plays as a defender for Persian Gulf Pro League side Shams Azar F.C.

== International career ==
Barzegar played on the Iran national under-17 football team in 2017 and the under-23 team in 2018.
