= 2021–22 Iran Football's 3rd Division =

Iran Football's 3rd Division
- Season: 2021–22
- Matches played: Uefa Beer Competition

The article contains information about the 2021–22 Iran 3rd Division football season. This is the 4th rated football league in Iran after the Persian Gulf Cup, Azadegan League, and 2nd Division. The league will start on 14 November 2021.

In total 85 teams (65 teams in the first stage in 5 groups, 20 teams in second stage) competed in this season's competitions.

== First stage ==
The top 2 teams from each group advance to the Second Stage. The teams ranked 3rd, 4th and 5th in each group (total 15 teams) are eligible to play in the First Round of next season. The teams ranked 6th and lower relegate to Provincial Leagues.

=== Qualified teams ===
Teams which are eligible to play in this round are as follows:

Relegated from 3rd Division – 2nd Stage (10 Teams):

- Esteghlal Shoosh
- Pishgaman Fonoon Pars
- Kanyav Oshnavieh (Replaced by Damash Gilan)
- Sanat Abrisham Isfahan (Replaced by Zarbeh Azad Naghsh-e-Jahan)
- Farhang Isar (Moghavemat) Astara
- Yazd Looleh
- Parag Tehran
- Khalij Fars Minab
- PAS Gilan
- Damavand Amol

Remaining from 3rd Division – 1st Stage (15 Teams):

- Arian sepand Tehran
- Sohan Mohammad Qom (Replaced by Ario Bam Eslamshahr)
- Shohadaye Garous Bijar
- Perspolis Borazjan
- Oghab Shiraz
- Shariat Novin Mashhad
- Setaregan Simorgh Alborz
- (Green) Keshavarz Nahavand
- Piroozi Negin Khoormooj (Replaced by Esteghlal Jonoob Tehran)
- Foolad Hormozgan
- Darya Harabdeh Mahmoudabad
- Arya Minoo Khorramdareh
- Kavian Naghadeh
- Pardis Khorramabad (Replaced by Gahar Novin Dorood)
- Shahid Bagheri Goyom Fars (Replaced by Perspolis Shiraz)

Promoted from Provincial Leagues (34 Teams):

- Vahdat Aghasht (Alborz)
- Heyat Football Germi (Ardebil)
- Ettehad Solduz (Azarbayejan Gharbi)
- Zist Sabz Tabriz (Azarbayejan Sharghi)
- Safa Javan Gostar (Boushehr)
- Shohadaye Aboozar Farsan (Chaharmahal & Bakhtiyari)
- Shayan Dizel Fars (Fars)
- Payam Moghavemat Anzali (Gilan)
- Novin Keshavarz Aliabad (Golestan)
- Eksir Alvand (Hamedan)
- Harang Javan Bastak (Hormozgan)
- Shahrani Dehloran (Ilam)
- Taraz Chadegan (Isfahan)
- Shahid Zahmatkeshan Jiroft (Kerman)
- Zagros Javanrood (Kermanshah)
- Entezar Khorasan Jonoubi (Khorasan Jonoubi)
- Khayam Beton Neyshabur (Khorasan Razavi)
- Shahin Bojnord (Khorasan Shomali)
- Yadavaran Dokoohe Andimeshk (Khouzestan)
- Erfan Eghtedar Kish (Kish)
- Aboozar Basht (Kohgiluye & Boyer Ahmad)
- Abidar Sanandaj (Kordestan)
- Khorram Kesht Aflak Khorramabad (Lorestan)
- Aluminium Pars Saveh (Markazi)
- Yaran Hadi Norouzi (Mazandaran)
- Ettehad Qazvin (Qazvin)
- Sorkhpooshan Qom (Qom)
- Pasargad Damghan (Semnan)
- Ettehad Nikshahr (Sistan & Balouchestan)
- Setaregan Sorkh Tehran (Tehran)
- Borna Rastin Maham (Tehran's runner-up)
- Shahin Dehdari Tehran (Tehran Suburbs)
- (Yazd) Yazd didn't submit any teams as Province Champion
- Alavi Khoramdareh (Zanjan)

Free slots (6 teams):

- Kimia Roshd aqqalla
- Shahrvand Ramsar
- Caspian Fereydoonkenar
- Savalan Meshkinshahr
- Mehrgan Dareshahr
- KIA Tehran

=== Group A ===
Pos	Team	Pld	W	D	L	GF	GA	GD	Pts	Qualification or relegation
1	Novin Keshavarz Aliabad	12	8	4	0	29	7	+22	28	Promotion to Second Stage
2	Shahin Bojnord	12	7	4	1	21	8	+13	25 (Note: Head-to-head points: Shahin Bojnord 3, Yaran Hadi Norouzi 0.)	Promotion to Second Stage
3	Yaran Hadi Norouzi	12	7	4	1	25	7	+18	25	
4	Shariat Novin Mashhad	12	7	2	3	17	12	+5	23 (Note: Head-to-head points: Shariat Novin Mashhad 3, Arian Sepand Tehran 0.)	
5	Arian Sepand Tehran	12	7	2	3	18	11	+7	23	
6	Esteghlal Jonoob Tehran	12	6	2	4	26	18	+8	20	Relegation to Provincial Leagues 2022–23
7	Borna Rastin Maham	12	5	4	3	15	10	+5	19 (Note: Head-to-head points: Borna Rastin Maham 3, Kimia Roshd Aqqala 0.)	Relegation to Provincial Leagues 2022–23
8	Kimia Roshd Aqqala	12	5	4	3	21	13	+8	19	Relegation to Provincial Leagues 2022–23
9	Darya Harabdeh Mahmoudabad	12	4	2	6	16	15	+1	14	Relegation to Provincial Leagues 2022–23
10	Entezar Khorasan Jonoubi	12	3	2	7	12	20	−8	11	Relegation to Provincial Leagues 2022–23
11	Khayam Beton Neyshabur	12	2	1	9	7	33	−26	7	Relegation to Provincial Leagues 2022–23
12	Pasargad Damghan	12	1	1	10	13	32	−19	4	Relegation to Provincial Leagues 2022–23
13	Damavand Amol	12	0	0	12	2	36	−34	0	Eliminated

Updated to match(es) played on 31 January 2022. Source: Dsport
Rules for classification: 1) Points; 2) Head-to-head points; 3) Head-to-head goal difference; 4) Head-to-head goals scored; 5) Goal difference; 6) Goals scored; 7) Play-off at neutral venue.
(Note: Head-to-head record is used only after all the matches between the teams in question have been played).

=== Group B ===
Pos	Team	Pld	W	D	L	GF	GA	GD	Pts	Qualification or relegation
1	Damash Gilan	12	5	7	0	11	6	+5	22	Promotion to Second Stage
2	Ario Bam Eslamshahr	12	6	3	3	27	11	+16	21	Promotion to Second Stage
3	Vahdat Aghasht	12	5	5	2	12	7	+5	20	
4	Setaregan Sorkh Tehran	12	5	4	3	17	10	+7	19	
5	Setaregan Simorgh Alborz	12	4	6	2	7	6	+1	18	
6	PAS Gilan	12	5	2	5	11	13	−2	17	Relegation to Provincial Leagues 2022–23
7	Sorkhpooshan Qom	12	4	4	4	11	12	−1	16	Relegation to Provincial Leagues 2022–23
8	Aluminium Pars Saveh	12	3	6	3	9	8	+1	15 (Note: Head-to-head points: Aluminium Pars Saveh 3, Green Keshavarz Nahavand 0.)	Relegation to Provincial Leagues 2022–23
9	Green Keshavarz Nahavand	12	5	0	7	15	17	−2	15	Relegation to Provincial Leagues 2022–23
10	Caspian Fereydoonkenar	12	3	5	4	12	13	−1	14	Relegation to Provincial Leagues 2022–23
11	Shahrvand Ramsar	12	3	3	6	6	15	−9	12 (Note: Head-to-head points: Shahrvand Ramsar 3, Parag Tehran 0.)	Relegation to Provincial Leagues 2022–23
12	Parag Tehran	12	3	3	6	8	18	−10	12	Relegation to Provincial Leagues 2022–23
13	Ettehad Qazvin	12	1	4	7	11	21	−10	7	Relegation to Provincial Leagues 2022–23

Updated to match(es) played on 31 January 2022. Source: Dsport
Rules for classification: 1) Points; 2) Head-to-head points; 3) Head-to-head goal difference; 4) Head-to-head goals scored; 5) Goal difference; 6) Goals scored; 7) Play-off at neutral venue.
(Note: Head-to-head record is used only after all the matches between the teams in question have been played).

=== Group C ===
Pos	Team	Pld	W	D	L	GF	GA	GD	Pts	Qualification or relegation
1	Abidar Sanandaj	10	6	4	0	14	5	+9	22	Promotion to Second Stage
2	Alavi Khoramdareh	10	5	4	1	15	10	+5	19	Promotion to Second Stage
3	Pishgaman Fonoon Pars	10	4	6	0	9	4	+5	18	
4	Zist Sabz Tabriz	10	3	6	1	13	7	+6	15	
5	Payam Moghavemat Anzali	10	4	2	4	9	11	−2	14	
6	Shahin Dehdari Tehran	10	3	3	4	11	10	+1	12	Relegation to Provincial Leagues 2022–23
7	Ettehad Mohammadyar	10	3	2	5	18	18	0	11	Relegation to Provincial Leagues 2022–23
8	Heyat Football Germi	10	2	3	5	13	19	−6	9 (Note: Head-to-head points: Heyat Football Germi 3, Savalan Meshkinshahr 0.)	Relegation to Provincial Leagues 2022–23
9	Savalan Meshkinshahr	10	2	3	5	10	19	−9	9	Relegation to Provincial Leagues 2022–23
10	Shohadaye Garous Bijar	10	2	2	6	13	17	−4	8	Relegation to Provincial Leagues 2022–23
11	Ahvaz Bahari Esteghlal	10	0	7	3	6	11	−5	7	Relegation to Provincial Leagues 2022–23
12	Kavian Naghadeh	0	0	0	0	0	0	0	0	Eliminated
13	Arya Minoo Khorramdareh	0	0	0	0	0	0	0	0	Eliminated

Updated to match(es) played on 1 February 2022. Source: Dsport
Rules for classification: 1) Points; 2) Head-to-head points; 3) Head-to-head goal difference; 4) Head-to-head goals scored; 5) Goal difference; 6) Goals scored; 7) Play-off at neutral venue.
(Note: Head-to-head record is used only after all the matches between the teams in question have been played).

=== Group D ===
Pos	Team	Pld	W	D	L	GF	GA	GD	Pts	Qualification or relegation
1	Esteghlal Shoosh	12	8	3	1	23	6	+17	27	Promotion to Second Stage
2	KIA Tehran	12	7	5	0	20	4	+16	26 (Note: Head-to-head points: KIA Tehran 3, Perspolis Borazjan 0.)	Promotion to Second Stage
3	Perspolis Borazjan	12	8	2	2	17	6	+11	26	
4	Khorram Kesht Aflak Khorramabad	11	6	3	2	20	8	+12	21	
5	Yadavaran Dokoohe Andimeshk	12	6	2	4	12	7	+5	20	
6	Sharhani Dehloran	12	5	4	3	17	13	+4	19	Relegation to Provincial Leagues 2022–23
7	Safa Javan Gostar	12	5	2	5	17	20	−3	17	Relegation to Provincial Leagues 2022–23
8	Gahar Novin Dorood	12	4	4	4	15	12	+3	16	Relegation to Provincial Leagues 2022–23
9	Shohadaye Aboozar Farsan	11	3	2	6	17	16	+1	11	Relegation to Provincial Leagues 2022–23
10	Eksir Alvand	12	2	3	7	8	21	−13	9 (Note: Head-to-head points: Eksir Alvand 4, Vahdat Ilam 3, Aboozar Basht 1.)	Relegation to Provincial Leagues 2022–23
11	Vahdat Ilam	12	2	3	7	11	22	−11	9	Relegation to Provincial Leagues 2022–23
12	Aboozar Basht	12	2	3	7	8	20	−12	9	Relegation to Provincial Leagues 2022–23
13	Zagros Javanrood	12	0	2	10	7	37	−30	2	Relegation to Provincial Leagues 2022–23

Updated to match(es) played on 2 February 2022. Source: Dsport
Rules for classification: 1) Points; 2) Head-to-head points; 3) Head-to-head goal difference; 4) Head-to-head goals scored; 5) Goal difference; 6) Goals scored; 7) Play-off at neutral venue.
(Note: Head-to-head record is used only after all the matches between the teams in question have been played).

=== Group E ===
Pos	Team	Pld	W	D	L	GF	GA	GD	Pts	Qualification or relegation
1	Yazd Looleh	11	8	2	1	13	3	+10	26	Promotion to Second Stage
2	Foolad Hormozgan	11	6	5	0	18	6	+12	23 (Note: Head-to-head points: Foolad Hormozgan 1, Harang Javan Bastak 1. Head-to-head goal difference: Foolad Hormozgan 0, Harang Javan Bastak 0. Tied on head-to-head criteria.)	Promotion to Second Stage
3	Harang Javan Bastak	11	7	2	2	16	8	+8	23	
4	Taraz Chadegan	11	6	1	4	18	9	+9	19	
5	Shayan Dizel Fars	11	5	2	4	18	12	+6	17	
6	Shahid Zahmatkeshan Jiroft	11	5	1	5	15	15	0	16 (Note: Head-to-head points: Shahid Zahmatkeshan Jiroft 6, Perspolis Shiraz 3, Oghab Shiraz 0.)	Relegation to Provincial Leagues 2022–23
7	Perspolis Shiraz	11	5	1	5	17	15	+2	16	Relegation to Provincial Leagues 2022–23
8	Oghab Shiraz	11	4	4	3	13	5	+8	16	Relegation to Provincial Leagues 2022–23
9	Zarbeh Azad Naghsh-e-Jahan	11	2	4	5	12	16	−4	10	Relegation to Provincial Leagues 2022–23
10	Khalij Fars Minab	11	2	3	6	9	15	−6	9	Relegation to Provincial Leagues 2022–23
11	Ettehad Nikshahr	11	1	2	8	5	27	−22	5	Relegation to Provincial Leagues 2022–23
12	Erfan Eghtedar Kish	11	1	1	9	5	28	−23	4	Relegation to Provincial Leagues 2022–23
13	Yazd Champion	0	0	0	0	0	0	0	0	Eliminated

Updated to match(es) played on 3 February 2022. Source: Dsport
Rules for classification: 1) Points; 2) Head-to-head points; 3) Head-to-head goal difference; 4) Head-to-head goals scored; 5) Goal difference; 6) Goals scored; 7) Play-off at neutral venue.
(Note: Head-to-head record is used only after all the matches between the teams in question have been played).

== Second stage ==
In this stage, 10 teams who qualified from 1st stage will join to 16 remaining teams from previous season and 4 relegated teams from 2nd division (total 30 teams). Teams will be divided into 3 groups of 10 teams each and play a round-robin home and away matches. The winner of each group will promote to 2nd division and 3 runners-up and the best 3rd placed team will qualify to Play-off stage. The 3 bottom clubs in each group and the worst 7th placed team among groups will relegate to next season's 1st stage.

=== Qualified teams ===
Relegated from 2nd Division (4 Teams):

- Avalan Kamyaran
- Sardar Bukan
- Naft va Gaz Gachsaran (Replaced by Melli Haffari Ahvaz)
- Naft Omidiyeh

Remaining Teams from last season (16 Teams):

- Khalij Fars Mahshahr (Replaced by Mohtasham Tabriz And Then, Setareh Ettehad Tabriz)
- Omid Vahdat Birjand (Replaced by Parsa Sanat Birjand)
- Artam Tabriz
- Sepahan Novin Isfahan
- Naft Iranian Tehran (Replaced by Darya Babol)
- Shahrdari Fooman
- Iman Sabz Shiraz (Replaced by Samit Tehran)
- Mardan Pasha Karaj
- Besat Kermanshah (Replaced by Panik Talesh)
- Moghavemat Tehran
- Sepahan Novin Izeh
- Javan Novin Sari
- Kian Arak
- Farhang ramhormoz
- Mohajer Novin Mashhad (Shadkaam Mashhad)
- Benyamin Varzesh Tehran

Promoted from 1st Stage (10 Teams):

- Novin Keshavarz Aliabad
- Damash Gilan
- Moghavemat Astara
- Esteghlal Shoosh
- Yazd Looleh
- Shahin Bojnord
- Ario Bam Eslamshahr
- Alavi Khoramdareh
- KIA Tehran
- Foolad Hormozgan

=== Group 1 ===
Pos	Team	Pld	W	D	L	GF	GA	GD	Pts	Qualification or relegation
1	Ario Bam Eslamshahr (P)	18	9	6	3	24	19	+5	33	Promotion to 2022-23 Iran Football's 2nd Division
2	Kia Tehran	18	9	4	5	27	19	+8	31 (Note: Head-to-head points: Kia Tehran 3, Mardan Pasha Karaj 3. Head-to-head goal difference: Kia Tehran 0, Mardan Pasha Karaj 0. Head-to-head away goals: Kia Tehran 1, Mardan Pasha Karaj 0.)	Promotion to Play-off
3	Mardan Pasha Karaj	18	9	4	5	21	14	+7	31	
4	Parsa Sanat	18	7	8	3	19	10	+9	29	
5	Shahin Bojnord	18	7	5	6	18	18	0	26	
6	Shadkam Mashhad	18	5	8	5	26	21	+5	23 (Note: Head-to-head points: Shadkam Mashhad 2, Novin Keshavarz Aliabad 2. Head-to-head goal difference: Shadkam Mashhad 0, Novin Keshavarz Aliabad 0. Head-to-head away goals: Shadkaam Mashhad 2, Novin Keshavarz Aliabad 1.)	
7	Novin Keshavarz Aliabad	18	5	8	5	16	16	0	23	
8	Moghavemat Tehran (R)	18	5	7	6	15	17	−2	22	Relegation to 3rd Division - 1st Stage 2022–23
9	Darya Babol (R)	18	4	2	12	12	30	−18	14	Relegation to 3rd Division - 1st Stage 2022–23
10	Javan Novin Sari (R)	18	2	4	12	17	31	−14	10	Relegation to 3rd Division - 1st Stage 2022–23

Updated to match(es) played on 9 July 2022. Source: Dsport
Rules for classification: 1) Points; 2) Head-to-head points; 3) Head-to-head goal difference; 4) Head-to-head goals scored; 5) Goal difference; 6) Goals scored; 7) Play-off at neutral venue.
(Note: Head-to-head record is used only after all the matches between the teams in question have been played).

=== Group 2 ===
Pos	Team	Pld	W	D	L	GF	GA	GD	Pts	Qualification or relegation
1	Panik Talesh (P)	18	11	6	1	33	13	+20	39	Promotion to 2022-23 Iran Football's 2nd Division
2	Benyamin Varzesh Tehran	18	10	6	2	28	11	+17	36	Promotion to Play-off
3	Damash Gilan	18	9	6	3	30	15	+15	33	Promotion to Play-off
4	Setareh Ettehad Tabriz	18	9	5	4	27	16	+11	32	
5	Moghavemat Astara	18	7	4	7	24	24	0	25	
6	Avalan Kamyaran	18	6	5	7	19	19	0	23	
7	Shahrdari Fooman	18	4	7	7	20	22	−2	19 (Note: Head-to-head points: Shahrdari Fooman 4, Artam Tabriz 1.)	
8	Artam Tabriz (R)	18	4	7	7	19	22	−3	19	Relegation to 3rd Division - 1st Stage 2022–23
9	Alavi Khoramdareh (R)	18	2	4	12	14	38	−24	10	Relegation to 3rd Division - 1st Stage 2022–23
10	Sardar Bukan (R)	18	1	4	13	6	40	−34	−2 (Note: Sardar Bukan was deducted 9 points due to match-fixing scandal in previous season.)	Relegation to 3rd Division - 1st Stage 2022–23

Updated to match(es) played on 9 July 2022. Source: Dsport
Rules for classification: 1) Points; 2) Head-to-head points; 3) Head-to-head goal difference; 4) Head-to-head goals scored; 5) Goal difference; 6) Goals scored; 7) Play-off at neutral venue.
(Note: Head-to-head record is used only after all the matches between the teams in question have been played).

=== Group 3 ===
Pos	Team	Pld	W	D	L	GF	GA	GD	Pts	Qualification or relegation
1	Foolad Hormozgan (P)	18	10	3	5	28	16	+12	33	Promotion to 2022-23 Iran Football's 2nd Division
2	Sepahan Novin Isfahan	18	7	7	4	31	19	+12	28 (Note: Head-to-head points: Sepahan Novin Isfahan 9, Naft Omidiyeh 4, Yazd Looleh 4. Head-to-head goal difference: Sepahan Novin Isfahan +6, Naft Omidiyeh -2, Yazd Looleh -4.)	Promotion to Play-off
3	Naft Omidiyeh	18	7	7	4	26	23	+3	28	
4	Yazd Looleh	18	8	4	6	19	20	−1	28	
5	Kian Arak	18	7	6	5	17	18	−1	27	
6	Samit Tehran	18	6	5	7	18	20	−2	23	
7	Sepahan Novin Izeh	18	4	9	5	16	22	−6	21	
8	Naft Va Gaz Gachsaran (R)	18	4	7	7	15	19	−4	19	Relegation to 3rd Division - 1st Stage 2022–23
9	Esteghlal Shoosh (R)	18	5	3	10	17	23	−6	18 (Note: Head-to-head points: Esteghlal Shoosh 4, Farhang Ramhormoz 1.)	Relegation to 3rd Division - 1st Stage 2022–23
10	Farhang Ramhormoz (R)	18	5	3	10	16	23	−7	18	Relegation to 3rd Division - 1st Stage 2022–23

Updated to match(es) played on 9 July 2022. Source: Dsport
Rules for classification: 1) Points; 2) Head-to-head points; 3) Head-to-head goal difference; 4) Head-to-head goals scored; 5) Goal difference; 6) Goals scored; 7) Play-off at neutral venue.
(Note: Head-to-head record is used only after all the matches between the teams in question have been played).

=== Ranking of third-placed teams ===
Pos	Team	Pld	W	D	L	GF	GA	GD	Pts	Qualification or relegation
1	Damash Gilan	18	9	6	3	30	15	+15	33	Promotion to Play-off
2	Mardan Pasha Karaj	18	9	4	5	21	14	+7	31	
3	Naft Omidiyeh	18	7	7	4	26	23	+3	28	

Updated to match(es) played on 9 July 2022. Source:
Rules for classification: 1) points; 2) goal difference; 3) number of goals scored; 4) Play-off at neutral venue.

=== Ranking of seventh-placed teams ===
Pos	Team	Pld	W	D	L	GF	GA	GD	Pts	Qualification or relegation
1	Novin Keshavarz Aliabad	18	5	8	5	16	16	0	23	
2	Sepahan Novin Izeh	18	4	9	5	16	22	−6	21	
3	Shahrdari Fooman	18	4	7	7	20	22	−2	19	Remained in 3rd Division - 2nd Stage 2022–23 after relegation

Updated to match(es) played on 9 March 2022. Source:
Rules for classification: 1) points; 2) goal difference; 3) number of goals scored; 4) play-off at neutral venue.

The worst seventh-placed should relegate to 3rd Division - 1st Stage. But due to direct relegation of Gol Reyhan Alborz from 2nd division to 3rd Division - 1st Stage (instead of 3rd Division - 2nd Stage), they remained in 3rd Division - 2nd Stage and not relegated.

== Play-offs ==
The draw of the play-off round held on July 11 2022, between following teams:

=== Qualified teams ===
2nd placed teams in Second Stage (3 teams):

- KIA Tehran
- Benyamin Varzesh Tehran
- Sepahan Novin Isfahan

Best 3rd placed team in Second Stage (1 team):

- Damash Gilan

=== First round ===
Team 1	Score	Team 2	1st leg	2nd leg	Notes
Sepahan Novin Isfahan	2-2 (3-5 p)	Benyamin Varzesh Tehran	1-1	1-1 (a.e.t.)	
Kia Tehran	1-2	Damash Gilan	0-0	1-2	

16 July 2022
20:00

Sepahan Novin Isfahan	1-1	Benyamin Varzesh Tehran

Naghsh-e Jahan Stadium, Isfahan
23 July 2022
19:30

Benyamin Varzesh Tehran	1-1 (a.e.t.) (5-3 p)	Sepahan Novin Isfahan

Ghadir Stadium, Tehran

Benyamin Varzesh Tehran won 5-3 on penalties and promoted to second play-off round.

20 July 2022
19:30

Kia Tehran	0-0	Damash Gilan

Be'sat Stadium, Tehran
24 July 2022
19:30

Damash Gilan	2-1	Kia Tehran

Sardar Jangal Stadium, Rasht

Damash Gilan won 2-1 on aggregate and promoted to second play-off round.

=== Second round ===
Team 1	Score	Team 2	1st leg	2nd leg	Notes
Damash Gilan	4-1	Benyamin Varzesh Tehran	2-0	2-1	

30 July 2022
19:00

Damash Gilan	2-0	Benyamin Varzesh Tehran

Sardar Jangal Stadium, Rasht
11 August 2022
20:00

Benyamin Varzesh Tehran	1-2	Damash Gilan
7'		Siamak Alizadeh 71' (P); Mehrgan Golbarg 89'

Ghadir Stadium, Tehran

Damash Gilan won 4-1 on aggregate and promoted to 2022-23 Iran Football's 2nd Division.
