= Elmoadab Tabriz F.C. =

Iranian association football club

Elmoadab
- Full name: Elmoadab Tabriz Football Club
- Founded: 2013; 6 years ago
- Ground: Marzdaran Stadium; Tabriz
- Capacity: 5,000
- Chairman: Esmaeil Babazadeh
- Manager: Younes Bahonar
- League: Azadegan League
Home colours	Away colours	Third colours

Elmoadab Tabriz Football Club (Persian: باشگاه فوتبال علم و ادب تبریز, Bashgah-e Futbal-e Elmuadab Tebriz) is an Iranian football club based in Tabriz, Iran who compete in Azadegan League.

The club bought the licence of Shahrdari Tabriz in Azadegan League in 2019.

== See also ==
- Azadegan League
