= Navad Urmia F.C. =

Iranian football club

90 Urmia F.C.
- Full name: 90 Urmia Football Club
- Nickname: Doxsan
- Founded: 2011; 15 years ago
- Ground: Shahid Bakeri Urmia Stadium
- Capacity: 15,000
- Owner(s): Department of Sports and Youth of West Azarbaijan
- Chairman: Yahya Bahari
- Manager: Hossein Khatibi
- League: Azadegan League
- 2024–25: 2nd (Group 1) – Promoted to the Azadegan League

90 Urmia Football Club is an Iranian professional football club based in Urmia city, currently playing in the second tier Azadegan League.

The club was founded in 2011 and joined the Azadegan League in August 2018, after the transfer of Gostaresh Foulad to the city of Urmia.

== Season-by-season ==
Season	Division	Position	Hazfi Cup
2020–21	Azadegan League	17th	—
2021–22	2nd Division	5th	Round of 32
2022–23	2nd Division	10th	Round of 16
2023–24	2nd Division	8th	—
2024–25	2nd Division	2nd	—
2025–26	Azadegan League	—	—

== Current squads ==
As of 15 February 2026

=== First Team ===
Note: Flags indicate national team as defined under FIFA eligibility rules; some limited exceptions apply. Players may hold more than one non-FIFA nationality.

No.	Pos.	Nation	Player
3	DF	IRN	Behzad Norouzi
4	MF	IRN	Hadi Aghazadeh
6	MF	IRN	Arman Soudagar
7	MF	IRN	Mohammad Khorram
8	MF	IRN	Mohammad Rostamizad
9	FW	IRN	Mohammad Bakhtiari
13	GK	IRN	Amirmohammad Bahari
14	FW	IRN	Nader Mohammadnejad
15	FW	IRN	Babak Moradi
16	DF	IRN	Hossein Shaverdi
17	FW	IRN	Armin Mostafavi
18	FW	IRN	Mohammad Gholamreza
21	FW	IRN	Hossein Parvaresh
22	GK	IRN	Abbas Bakhtiari
26	DF	IRN	Mostafa Kiani
33	GK	IRN	Erfan Mostafavi
34	FW	IRN	Mohammadreza Moharrami
36	MF	IRN	Hossein Zaghi

No.	Pos.	Nation	Player
43	MF	IRN	Alireza Rezaei Ghojebeiglou
47	DF	IRN	Reza Karampour
51	MF	IRN	Reza Taheri
60	FW	IRN	Keyvan Kadkhodazadeh
61	MF	IRN	Amirhossein Ahmadi
66	DF	IRN	Pouria Najafgholizadeh
69	MF	IRN	Matin Bakhtiarian
70	FW	IRN	Ramin Najafpour
76	DF	IRN	Reza Ahmadianzadeh
77	DF	IRN	Mehdi Savari
79	MF	IRN	Sina Azadkhah
80	MF	IRN	Amirhossein Abdi
84	DF	IRN	Yasin Mahmoudi
90	DF	IRN	Mohammad Zeynali (captain)
91	FW	IRN	Amirmohammad Saghaei
