= Atrak Bojnourd F.C. =

Iranian football club

Atrak Khorasan Shomali(Bojnourd) Football Club
- Full name: Atrak Bojnourd Football Club
- Founded: 2018
- Ground: 19 Mehr Bojnourd Stadium Takhti Stadium
- Capacity: 15,000 5,000
- Owner: Department of Sports and Youth of North Khorasan
- Manager: Seyed Saeid Engashteh
- League: League 2
- 2021–22: League 2

Atrak Bojnourd Football Club is an Iranian football club based in Bojnourd, North Khorasan province, Iran. They currently compete in the League 2.

Atrak Bojnord was founded in 2018 by Moghavemat Tehran Football Club by the Department of Sports and Youth of North Khorasan province. This club was previously It was about to buy the points of Khoneh be Khoneh Babol football club, which changed the ownership of Khoneh be Khoneh and changed its name to Raika Babol and the team stayed in Mazandaran province, they turned to buying second league points.

== Players ==
=== Current squad ===
Note: Flags indicate national team as defined under FIFA eligibility rules; some limited exceptions apply. Players may hold more than one non-FIFA nationality.

No.	Pos.	Nation	Player
1	GK	(Iran) IRN	Mehdi Sedghian (Vice Captain)
22	DF	(Iran) IRN	Ershad Yousefi (On loan from Kortrijk)
70	DF	(Iran) IRN	Saeed Salarvand
5	DF	(Iran) IRN	Ahmad Hayatmanesh
3	MF	(Iran) IRN	Mohammadreza Hasemi
12	FW	(Iran) IRN	Arin Estarki
13	MF	(Iran) IRN	Mohammad hasani
18	MF	(Iran) IRN	Hamed Asadpour
7	FW	(Iran) IRN	Milad Mohammadi ^{U23}
8	MF	(Iran) IRN	Misam Khodasenas
99	GK	(Iran) IRN	Esmaeil Farhadi

No.	Pos.	Nation	Player
2	MF	(Iran) IRN	Amirmasoud Sar Abadani
6	MF	(Iran) IRN	Amin Torkashvand ^{U25}
77	DF	(Iran) IRN	Yousef Seyedi
10	DF	(Iran) IRN	Milad Jahan Manesh (captain)
9	MF	(Iran) IRN	Younes Izanlo
—	DF	(Iran) IRN	Esmaeil Alipour ^{U23}
—	DF	(Iran) IRN	Amirhossein Hooseinpoor
16	FW	(Iran) IRN	Ali Atef

== Season-by-Season ==
The table below shows the achievements of the club in various competitions.

Season	League	Position	Hazfi Cup	Notes
2011–12	3rd Division		Third Round

== See also ==
- Hazfi Cup
- Iran Football's 3rd Division 2011–12
