= Qashqai F. C. =

Iranian football club

Shohada Qashqai Football Club باشگاه فرهنگی ورزشی شهدای قشقایی
- Full name: Qashqai Cultural Sport Club
- Nickname: Qaşqaylar (قاشقايلار)
- Founded: 2012
- Dissolved: 2021
- Ground: Hafezieh Stadium
- Capacity: 12,000
- Owner: Qashqai family
- Manager: Dariush Hormozi
- League: Azadegan League
- 2020–21: Azadegan League, 14th
- Website: http://www.fcqashqaei.com/

Qashqai Football Club (Persian: باشگاه فرهنگی ورزشی قشقایی, Bashgah-e Ferhengi-ye Vârzeshi-ye Qâshqâiye) or Qashqai Cultural Sport Club was a football club based in Shiraz, Iran. Qashqai participated in Azadegan League until 2022. In 2022, the participation of this team in the Azadegan League was given to Chadormalu Ardakan.

== History ==
Qashqai Football Club was established in Shiraz in 2012 with the support of Qashqai Turk people living in Fars and other neighboring provinces of Iran. Qashqai F.C. was reputed since they, as a second-tier club, surprisingly knocked Persepolis football team out of Iran's 2016–17 Hazfi Cup's 1/32 round on September 30, 2016. The two teams finished in a 1–1 draw after extra time, and Qashqai defeated Persepolis 6–5 in a penalty shootout.

On 30 September 2016, Qashqai produced one of the greatest ever shocks of the Hazfi Cup. Qashqai, a third-tier team, defeated Persepolis on penalty kicks. This win advanced the club to the Round of 32, where they played New Bargh and lost 1–0.

In 2022, the participation of this team in the Azadegan League was given to Chadormalu Ardakan.

== Current Management Team ==
| Position | Name |
|---|---|
| Team Manager | (Iran) Ashkan Najafpoor |
| Head coach | (Iran) Reza Enayati |
| Assistant coach | (Iran) Mohammad Hassan Rajabzadeh |
| Assistant coach | (Iran) Rashid Tahmasebi |
| Technical manager | (Iran) |

== See also ==
- Azadeghan League
- Persian gulf League
- Football in Iran
- Qashqai people
- Shiraz
