= 2005–06 Persepolis F.C. season =

Persepolis
2005–06 season
- Chairman: Hojatollah Khatib (until 5 December 2005); Mohammad Hassan Ansarifard (from 5 December 2005)
- Manager: Ali Parvin (until 3 February 2006); Arie Haan (from 3 February 2006)
- Stadium: Azadi Stadium
- Iran Pro League: 13th
- Hazfi Cup: Runner-up
- Top goalscorer: League: Javad Kazemian (12 goals); All: Javad Kazemian (12 goals)
Home colours	Away colours

The 2005–06 season was Persepolis's 5th season in the Pro League, and their 23rd consecutive season in the top division of Iranian Football. They also competed in the Hazfi Cup. Persepolis was captained by Behrouz Rahbarifar.

== Squad ==
As of February 2006. Note: Flags indicate national team as defined under FIFA eligibility rules; some limited exceptions apply. Players may hold more than one non-FIFA nationality.

No.	Pos.	Nation	Player
1	GK	IRI	Davoud Fanaei
2	MF	IRI	Ardalan Ashtiani
3	DF	IRI	Abolfazl Hajizadeh
4	DF	IRI	Reza Niknazar
5	DF	CZE	Robert Caha
6	MF	IRI	Karim Bagheri (vice captain)
7	MF	IRI	Mohammad Parvin
8	DF	IRI	Ali Ansarian
9	FW	IRI	Javad Kazemian
10	MF	IRI	Hamed Kavianpour (3rd captain)
11	MF	IRI	Mehrzad Madanchi
12	GK	IRI	Alireza Haghighi
13	DF	IRI	Sheys Rezaei
15	MF	IRI	Mohammad Reza Mamani

No.	Pos.	Nation	Player
16	FW	IRI	Ali Alizadeh
17	FW	IRI	Sohrab Entezari
18	MF	IRI	Pejman Nouri
19	FW	IRI	Meghdad Ghobakhlou
20	DF	IRI	Behrouz Rahbarifar (captain)
21	MF	IRI	Ebrahim Asadi
22	GK	IRI	Mohammad Mohammadi
23	MF	IRI	Davoud Seyed Abbasi
25	MF	CMR	Jacques Elong Elong
26	MF	IRI	Mostafa Mahdavikia
27	FW	NGR	Raphael Edereho
28	FW	IRI	Ehsan Khorsandi
30	GK	IRI	Farshid Karimi

=== Loan list ===
Note: Flags indicate national team as defined under FIFA eligibility rules; some limited exceptions apply. Players may hold more than one non-FIFA nationality.

No.	Pos.	Nation	Player
33	FW	IRI	Mehrdad Oladi (at (United Arab Emirates) Al Shabab)

== Transfers ==
=== In ===
No	P	Name	Age	Moving from	Transfer fee	Type	Transfer window	Source
3	CB	Abolfazl Hajizadeh	24	Tractor Sazi	–	Free Transfer	Summer	
4	CB	Reza Niknazar	25	Saba Battery	–	Free Transfer	Summer	
11	LW	Mehrzad Madanchi	22	Fajr Sepasi	–	Free Transfer	Summer	
18	CM	Pejman Nouri	25	Pegah	–	Free Transfer	Summer	
23	FB	Davoud Seyed-Abbasi	28	Sepahan	–	Free Transfer	Summer	
7	RM	Mohammad Parvin	17	Persepolis Academy	–	Promoted	Summer	
12	GK	Alireza Haghighi	20	Persepolis Academy	–	Promoted	Summer	
14	RW	Ehsan Khorsandi	20	Persepolis Academy	–	Promoted	Summer	
26	RM	Mostafa Mahdavikia	21	Bank Melli	–	Free Transfer	Summer	
25	RB	(Panama) Carlos Rivera	26	(Colombia) Independiente Medellín	–	Free Transfer	Summer	
5	CB	(Panama) Anthony Torres	33	(Honduras) Marathón	–	Free Transfer	Summer	
5	LB	(Czech Republic) Robert Caha	29	(Bulgaria) CSKA	–	Free Transfer	Winter	
25	DM	(Cameroon) Jacques Elong Elong	22	Mount Cameroon	undisclosed	Transfer	Winter	
27	CF	(Nigeria) Raphael Edereho	22	(Finland) Kuopion Palloseura	undisclosed	Transfer	Winter	

=== Out ===
No	P	Name	Age	Moving to	Transfer fee	Type	Transfer window	Source
	GK	(North Macedonia) Jane Nikolovski	33	Released			Summer	
2	CB	(North Macedonia) Ilče Pereski	29	Released			Summer	
18	CF	(Nigeria) Sambo Choji	27	Released			Summer	
5	CB	Mohammad Reza Mahdavi	33	Esteghlal Ahvaz	–	Free Transfer	Summer	
26	LW	Meisam Rezapour	23	Paykan	–	Free Transfer	Summer	
24	CF	Mehdi Salehpour	32	Released			Summer	
23	LW	Alireza Emamifar	31	Released			Summer	
3	RB	Hassan Khanmohammadi	28	Released			Summer	
4	CB	Yahya Golmohammadi	34	Saba Battery	–	Free Transfer	Summer	
11	RM	Pejman Jamshidi	28	Pas	–	Free Transfer	Summer	
12	CM	Aref Mohammadvand	35	Pegah	–	Free Transfer	Summer	
14	AM	Reza Jabbari	28	Aboumoslem	–	Free Transfer	Summer	
16	RW	Ali Salmani	26	Pegah	–	Free Transfer	Summer	
25	RB	(Panama) Carlos Rivera	26	(Panama) San Francisco	–	Free Transfer	Winter	
5	CB	(Panama) Anthony Torres	33	(Honduras) Victoria	–	Free Transfer	Winter	
33	SS	Mehrdad Oladi	20	(United Arab Emirates) Al Shabab	undisclosed	Loan	Winter	

== Technical staff ==
Position	Staff
Head coach	(Netherlands) Arie Haan
First Team coach	(Netherlands) Theo de Jong
Assistant coach	(Iran) Hamid Estili
Doctor	(Iran) Dr Farid Zarineh

== Competition record ==
Competition	Record							
Competition	G	W	D	L	GF	GA	GD	Win %
Iran Pro League	30	9	11	10	39	40	−1	30.00
Hazfi Cup	7	4	0	3	12	7	+5	57.14
Total	37	13	11	13	51	47	+4	35.14

=== Iran Pro League ===
==== Standings ====
Pos	Team	Pld	W	D	L	GF	GA	GD	Pts	Qualification or relegation
11	Esteghlal Ahvaz	30	9	8	13	42	44	−2	35	
12	Rah Ahan	30	9	7	14	27	43	−16	34	
13	Persepolis	30	9	11	10	39	40	−1	32 (Note: Persepolis was deducted 6 points in issued by FIFA.)	
14	Bargh	30	6	10	14	23	37	−14	28	
15	Shamoushak (R)	30	4	11	15	19	39	−20	23	Relegation to the 2006–07 Azadegan League

Updated to match(es) played on 01 SEP 2018. Source: IPL Stats, Soccerway
Rules for classification: 1) Points; 2) Goal difference; 3) Goals scored.
(R) Relegated

=== Pro League ===
Date Round	Home	Score	Away	Location

2 September 2005 1	Fajr Sepasi	2 – 2	Persepolis	Shiraz
	B. Esmaeili 10'; O. Ravankhah (yellow card) 24'; M. Neysani (yellow card) 28'; H. Beikzadeh 62' (yellow card) 90+2'; Gh. Rezaei (yellow card) 90+5' (red card) 90+5'	Stats	H. Kavianpour (yellow card) 9'; D. Seyed Abbasi (yellow card) 19'; A. Alizadeh 25'; A. Ansarian 90+4'	Stadium: Hafezieh Stadium; Attendance: 20,000; Referee: Mohsen Ghahremani

9 September 2005 2	Persepolis	0 – 0	Saipa	Tehran
	Sh. Rezaei (yellow card) 42' (yellow-red card) 52'; P. Nouri (yellow card) 57'; H. Kavianpour (yellow card) 61'	Stats	A. Vaziri (yellow card) 5'; D. Yazdani (yellow card) 14' (yellow-red card) 31'; M. Shojaei (yellow card) 62'; M. Memar (yellow card) 62'; E. Yousefi (yellow card) 90'	Stadium: Azadi Stadium; Attendance: 50,000; Referee: Hedayat Mombeyni

23 September 2005 4	Shamoushak	2 – 1	Persepolis	Noshahr
	M. Yousefi (yellow card) 24'; E. Mohseni 46' (yellow card) 79'; M. Jabarpour 57'; A. Ostovari (yellow card) 88'; M. Bahreyni (yellow card) 90+2'	Stats	A. Ansarian (yellow card) 44'; A. Alizadeh 71'; S. Entezari (red card) 90+1'	Attendance: 7,000; Referee: Mohsen Torki

30 September 2005 5	Persepolis	1 – 0	Shahid Ghandi	Tehran
	A. Alizadeh (yellow card) 67'; M. Madanchi 68'	Stats	D. Santos (yellow card) 55'; J. Fouladi (yellow card) 60'	Stadium: Azadi Stadium; Attendance: 33,000; Referee: Masoud Moradi

3 October 2005 6	Foolad	1 – 0	Persepolis	Ahvaz
	S. Sarlak (yellow card) 18'; N. Ahmadi 49' (yellow card) 88'; H. Kaabi (yellow card) 90+3'		P. Nouri (yellow card) 57'; D. Seyed Abbasi (yellow card) 90+3'	Stadium: Takhti Stadium; Attendance: 22,000; Referee: Khodadad Afsharian

16 October 2005 7	Persepolis	1 – 1	Zob Ahan	Tehran
	A. Alizadeh 5'; H. Kavianpour (yellow card) 51'	Stats	S. Heidari (yellow card) 25'; M. Rajabzadeh 55'	Stadium: Azadi Stadium; Attendance: 35,000; Referee: Fereydoon Esfahanian

20 October 2005 8	Bargh Shiraz	0 – 1	Persepolis	Shiraz
		Stats	M. Madanchi (yellow card) 44'; A. Alizadeh 75'	Stadium: Hafezieh Stadium; Attendance: 15,000; Referee: Iraj Nazari

27 October 2005 9	Persepolis	2 – 2	Saba Battery	Tehran
	E. Asadi (yellow card) 6'; A. Ansarian 18' (yellow card) 88'; A. Alizadeh (yellow card) 26' (goal) 62'	Stats	M. Mehdizadeh (yellow card) 21'; Y. Golmohammadi (yellow card) 21'; S. Daghighi (yellow card) 35'; S. Bakhtiarizadeh 46' (yellow card) 54'; A. Daei 49'; M. Navazi (yellow card) 60'	Stadium: Azadi Stadium; Attendance: 40,000; Referee: Rahim Rahimi Moghadam

4 November 2005 10	Esteghlal	1 – 0	Persepolis	Tehran
	A. Nikbakht (yellow card) 24'; A. Sadeghi (yellow card) 51'; R. Enayati 54'	Stats	H. Kavianpour (yellow card) 4'; J. Kazemian (yellow card) 46'; B. Rahbarifar (yellow card) 90+3'	Stadium: Azadi Stadium; Attendance: 80,000; Referee: (Germany) Wolfgang Stark

15 November 2005 11	Persepolis	4 – 1	Malavan	Tehran
	A. Hajizadeh (yellow card) 14' (goal) 58'; K. Bagheri (yellow card) 26'; D. Seyed Abbasi 34' (yellow card) 60'; J. Kazemian 47', 49'; A. Alizadeh (yellow card) 76'	Stats	M. Ghorbani 38'; M. Zare (yellow card) 78'	Stadium: Azadi Stadium; Attendance: 15,000; Referee: Fereydoon Esfahanian

20 November 2005 12	Aboumoslem	1 – 1	Persepolis	Mashhad
	A. Teymourian (yellow card) 40'; A. Shah Hosseini 70'; M. Nourmohammadi (yellow card) 75'	Stats	M. Mamani (yellow card) 17'; A. Ansarian 32'; M. Oladi (yellow card) 52'; M. Mahdavikia (yellow card) 69'; P. Nouri (yellow card) 73'; M. Madanchi (yellow card) 77'	Stadium: Takhti Stadium; Attendance: 22,000; Referee: Hedayat Mombeyni

25 November 2005 13	Persepolis	1 – 0	Esteghlal Ahvaz	Tehran
	Sh. Rezaei (yellow card) 26'; H. Kavianpour (yellow card) 35'; D. Seyed Abbasi (yellow card) 35'; K. Bagheri (yellow card) 53'; M. Oladi (yellow card) 72' (yellow-red card) 90+2'; J. Kazemian 88'; A. Alizadeh (yellow card) 89'; M. Madanchi (yellow card) 90+3'	Stats	M. Bijani (yellow card) 7'; A. Abu Al-Hail (yellow card) 43'; A. Alves (yellow card) 70'	Stadium: Azadi Stadium; Attendance: 30,000; Referee: Mohsen Torki

29 November 2005 3	Persepolis	1 – 0	Pas	Tehran
	A. Hajizadeh 77'; P. Nouri (yellow card) 80'; A. Alizadeh (yellow card) 84'; H. Kavianpour (yellow card) 84'; M. Ghobakhlou (yellow card) 90+2'	Stats	H. Pashaei (yellow card) 45'; P. Jamshidi (yellow card) 75'; K. Rahmati (yellow card) 79'; S. Hamedani (yellow card) 83'; B. Koushki (yellow card) 90+2'; J. Nekounam (yellow card) 90+4' (red card) 90+4'	Stadium: Azadi Stadium; Attendance: 35,000; Referee: Masoud Moradi

16 December 2005 14	Rah Ahan	0 – 0	Persepolis	Tehran
	D. Mahabadi (yellow card) 73'; A. Kosari (yellow card) 90+3'	Stats	A. Ansarian (yellow card) 90'	Stadium: Azadi Stadium; Attendance: 20,000; Referee: Iraj Nazari

23 December 2005 15	Persepolis	2 – 3	Sepahan	Tehran
	M. Madanchi (yellow card) 22'; J. Kazemian 36'; K. Bagheri (yellow card) 43'; P. Nouri 57'	Stats	R. Khatibi 30', 68'; R. Navidkia (yellow card) 31'; H. Jafari 52'	Stadium: Azadi Stadium; Attendance: 20,000; Referee: Fereydoon Esfahanian

30 December 2006 16	Persepolis	2 – 4	Fajr Sepasi	Tehran
	J. Kazemian 45'; A. Ansarian 76' (yellow card) 87'	Stats	H. Faraji 12', 67'; Gh. Rezaei 24', 33'; H. Beikzadeh (yellow card) 61'; O. Ravankhah (yellow card) 70'; B. Pourgholami (yellow card) 71'	Stadium: Azadi Stadium; Attendance: 25,000; Referee: Khodadad Afsharian

5 January 2006 17	Saipa	2 – 2	Persepolis	Tehran
	A. Ashourizad (yellow card) 32'; K. Borjlou (yellow card) 42'; M. Arzani 62'; M. Ayoubi (yellow card) 70'; J. Ashtiani 80'	Stats	S. Entezari 19' (yellow card) 10' (yellow-red card) 20'; M. Madanchi (yellow card) 21'; J. Kazemian 27'; R. Niknazar (yellow card) 90+1'	Stadium: Azadi Stadium; Attendance: 20,000; Referee: Masoud Moradi

10 January 2006 18	Pas	2 – 1	Persepolis	Tehran
	H, Pashaei 7', 32'; Kh. Heydari (yellow card) 28'; M. Nosrati (yellow card) 39'; O. Khouraj (yellow card) 53'; M. Meydavoudi (yellow card) 55'; M. Bayatinia (yellow card) 85'; M. Maniei (yellow card) 90'	Stats	A. Ansarian (yellow card) 17'; M. Madanchi 27'; J. Kazemian (yellow card) 44'; A. Hajizadeh (yellow card) 86'	Stadium: Azadi Stadium; Attendance: 10,000; Referee: Fereydoon Esfahanian

20 January 2006 19	Persepolis	2 – 1	Shamoushak	Tehran
	S. Entezari 14'; M. Madanchi (yellow card) 27'; A. Ansarian (yellow card) 44' (goal) 88'	Stats	M. Jabarpour 47'; M. Yousefi (yellow card) 70'; A. Rahimi (yellow card) 88'; M. Mokhtari (red card) 88'	Stadium: Azadi Stadium; Attendance: 25,000; Referee: Rahim Rahimi Moghadam

26 January 2006 20	Shahid Ghandi	0 – 2	Persepolis	Yazd
	(yellow card) 65'; (yellow card) 89'	Stats	S. Entezari 47'; Sh. Rezaei (yellow card) 48'; R. Niknazar (yellow card) 57'; D. Seyed Abbasi (yellow card) 75'; J. Kazemian 79'	Attendance: 30,000; Referee: Khodadad Afsharian

3 February 2006 21	Persepolis	2 – 3	Foolad	Tehran
	A. Ansarian 38' (yellow card) 42'; J. Kazemian 79'; D. Seyed Abbasi (yellow card) 90+1'	Stats	H. Kaabi (yellow card) 37'; E. Ridha 45'; P. Montazeri (yellow card) 52'; H. Chaharmahali 65'; O. Sharifinasab 87'	Stadium: Azadi Stadium; Attendance: 20,000; Referee: Masoud Moradi

12 February 2006 22	Zob Ahan	3 – 0	Persepolis	Fooladshahr
	M. Rajabzadeh 25', 37'; E. Farhadi 30' (yellow card) 51'; A. Nourmohammadi (yellow card) 41'; H. Ashjari (yellow card) 48'; F. Bahadorani (yellow card) 70'	Stats	E. Asadi (yellow card) 19' (red card) 19'; F. Karimi (yellow card) 37'; S. Entezari (yellow card) 40'	Stadium: Fooladshahr Stadium; Attendance: 15,000; Referee: Hedayat Mombeyni

16 February 2005 23	Persepolis	2 – 1	Bargh Shiraz	Tehran
	J. Kazemian 6', 45'; R. Niknazar (yellow card) 45'; D. Seyed Abbasi (yellow card) 52'; E. Khorsandi (yellow card) 68'	Stats	E. Mešanović (yellow card) 5' (goal) 18'; S. Zare (yellow card) 26'	Stadium: Azadi Stadium; Attendance: 20,000; Referee: Mohsen Torki

10 March 2006 25	Persepolis	0 – 0	Esteghlal	Tehran
	J. Kazemian (yellow card) 28'; M. Mamani (yellow card) 49'	Stats	R. Enayati (yellow card) 25'; P. Ghorbani (yellow card) 27'; M. Fekri (yellow card) 45'	Stadium: Azadi Stadium; Attendance: 95,000; Referee: (Kuwait) Saad Kamil

17 March 2005 26	Malavan	1 – 3	Persepolis	Anzali
	M. Gholamin 5'	Stats	Sh. Rezaei 16'; A. Ansarian 17'; A. Alizadeh 22'; A. Hajizadeh (yellow card) 34'	Stadium: Takhti Stadium; Attendance: 15,000; Referee: Fereydoon Esfahanian

31 March 2006 24	Saba Battery	2 – 1	Persepolis	Tehran
	S. Beygi (yellow card) 5'; M. Navazi 31'; Y. Golmohammadi (yellow card) 38'; B. Zolrahmi (yellow card) 41'; R. Markosi 56'; M. Zarei (yellow card) 63'; S. Bakhtiarizadeh (yellow card) 82'	Stats	R. Caha (yellow card) 21'; Sh. Rezaei 50'; D. Seyed Abbasi (yellow card) 69' (yellow-red card) 76'	Stadium: Azadi Stadium; Attendance: 20,000; Referee: Masoud Moradi

4 April 2006 27	Persepolis	2 – 2	Aboumoslem	Tehran
	A. Hajizadeh (yellow card) 17'; A. Ansarian 44'; J. Kazemian 54'; A. Alizadeh (yellow card) 83'; K. Bagheri (yellow card) 90+3'	Stats	M. Khalatbari 33'; M. Kheiri 41'; M. Nourmohammadi (yellow card) 43'; H. Badamaki (yellow card) 89'; M. Hosseini (yellow card) 89'	Stadium: Azadi Stadium; Attendance: 7,000; Referee: Fereydoon Esfahanian

9 April 2006 28	Esteghlal Ahvaz	2 – 2	Persepolis	Ahvaz
	Gh. Eydizadeh (yellow card); E. Taghipour 42' (yellow card) 45'; A. Khalifeh Asl 75'	Stats	M. Mamani (yellow card) 30'; Sh. Rezaei 55'; R. Edereho 61'	Stadium: Takhti Stadium; Attendance: 7,000; Referee: Mahmoud Rafiei

16 April 2006 29	Persepolis	1 – 1	Rah Ahan	Tehran
	A. Ansarian 65' (pen.)	Stats	H. Asghari 32'; M. Habibi (red card) 64'; A. Ghoncheh Araghi (yellow card) 79'	Stadium: Azadi Stadium; Attendance: 5,000; Referee: Mohsen Ghahremani

21 April 2006 30	Sepahan	2 – 0	Persepolis	Isfahan
	M. Nouri (yellow card) 53'; R. Khatibi 67'; J. Mujiri 86'	Stats	F. Karimi (red card) 25'; J. Kazemian (yellow card) 37'; M. Madanchi (yellow card) 62'; M. Mohammadi (yellow card) 73'; R. Caha (yellow card) 85'; K. Bagheri (yellow card) 88'	Stadium: Naghsh-e-Jahan Stadium; Attendance: 10,000; Referee: Rahim Rahimi Moghadam

==== Score overview ====
Win Draw Loss

Opposition	Home score	Away score	Aggregate score
Aboomoslem	1–1	2–2	3–3
Bargh Shiraz	2–1	0–1	3–1
Esteghlal	0–0	1–0	0–1
Esteghlal Ahvaz	1–0	2–2	3–2
Fajr Sepasi	2–4	2–2	4–6
Foolad	2–3	1–0	2–4
Malavan	4–1	1–3	7–2
PAS	1–0	2–1	2–2
Rah Ahan	1–1	0–0	1–1
Saba Battery	2–2	2–1	3–4
Saipa	0–0	2–2	2–2
Sepahan	2–3	2–0	5–2
Shahid Ghandi	1–0	0–2	3–0
Shamoushak	2–1	2–1	3–3
Zob Ahan	1–1	3–0	1–4

=== Hazfi Cup ===
Win Draw Loss Postponed

Date Round	Home	Score	Away	Location

5 March 2006 1/16	Persepolis	2 – 0	Kesht-o Sanat Shoushtar	Tehran
	D. Seyed Abbasi 38'; Sh. Rezaei 84'; H. Kavianpour (red card) 58'; A. Ansarian (yellow card)			Stadium: Azadi Stadium; Attendance: 1,500; Referee: Alireza Faghani

25 April 2006 1/8	Aboumoslem	2 – 3	Persepolis	Mashhad
			M. Madanchi 14', 33', 70' (yellow card); J. Elong Elong (yellow card)	Stadium: Samen Stadium; Referee: Khodadad Afsharian

29 April 2006 1/4	Persepolis	3 – 1	Malavan	Tehran
	P. Nouri 43'; M. Madanchi 69', 86'; M. Mohammadi (yellow card)			Stadium: Azadi Stadium; Attendance: 40,000; Referee: Iraj Nazari

7 May 2006 Semi-final	Nozhan	2 – 2 (a.e.t.) (6 – 7 p)	Persepolis	Sari
			M. Madanchi 40', 90' (pen.); K. Bagheri (yellow card); A. Hajizadeh (yellow card)	Stadium: Moptaghi Stadium; Attendance: 12,000; Referee: Mohsen Torki

==== Final ====
13 September 2006 first-leg	Persepolis	1 – 1	Sepahan	Tehran
17:40	H. Shafiei 73'; J. Akbari (yellow card); A. Abu Al Hail (yellow card)		A. Nikbakht 45+3'; M. Mamani (yellow card); Sh. Rezaei (yellow card); M. Zarei (yellow card)	Stadium: Azadi Stadium; Attendance: 70,000; Referee: Mohsen Torki

22 September 2006 Second-leg	Sepahan	1 – 1 (a.e.t.) (4 – 2 p)	Persepolis	Isfahan
15:00	H. Shafiei 63'; A. Abu Al Hail (yellow card)		E. Asadi 55'; H. Badamaki (yellow card) 70'; E. Khorsandi (yellow card) 81'; P. Nouri (yellow card); A. Nikbakht (yellow card)	Stadium: Naghsh-e-Jahan Stadium; Attendance: 40,000; Referee: Masoud Moradi
	Penalties
	H. Aghily (penalty scored); J. Akbari (penalty missed); M. Navidkia (penalty scored); A. Abu Al Hail (penalty scored); E. Ridha (penalty scored)		(penalty scored) K. Bagheri; (penalty scored) A. Hajizadeh; (penalty missed) Sh. Rezaei; (penalty missed) A. Nikbakht

2006 Hazfi Cup Final played after 2006–07 season's starts.

== Scorers ==
No.	Pos	Nat	Name	Pro League	Hazfi Cup	Total
9	RW	(Iran)	Javad Kazemian	11	0	11
8	CB	(Iran)	Ali Ansarian	9	0	9
11	LW	(Iran)	Mehrzad Madanchi	2	7	9
16	CF	(Iran)	Ali Alizadeh	6	0	6
13	CB	(Iran)	Sheys Rezaei	3	1	4
17	CF	(Iran)	Sohrab Entezari	3	0	3
3	CB	(Iran)	Abolfazl Hajizadeh	2	0	2
18	CM	(Iran)	Pejman Nouri	1	1	2
27	CF	(Nigeria)	Raphael Edereho	1	0	1
33	SS	(Iran)	Mehrdad Oladi	1	0	1
23	FB	(Iran)	Davoud Seyed-Abbasi	0	1	1
21	DM	(Iran)	Ebrahim Asadi	0	1	1
10	LW	(Iran)	Alireza Nikbakht	0	1	1
Totals				39	12	51

=== Goalkeeping ===
			League			Hazfi			Total		
No	N	Name	M	GA	CS	M	GA	CS	M	GA	CS
30	(Iran)	Farshid Karimi	19	23	4	3	2	1	22	25	5
22	(Iran)	Mohammad Mohammadi	11	12	4	3	5	0	14	17	4
1	(Iran)	Davoud Fanaei	1	4	0	–	–	–	1	4	0
Total			31*	39	8	6	7	1	37	46	9
Last updated: 31 August 2020

- In the match against Sepahan in the last week of the league, Farshid Karimi was sent off in the first half, and Mohammad Mohammadi came on as a substitute.

== See also ==
- 2005–06 Iran Pro League
- 2005–06 Hazfi Cup
