= 2006–07 Persepolis F.C. season =

Persepolis
2006–07 season
- Chairman: Mohammad Hassan Ansarifar
- Manager: Mustafa Denizli
- Persian Gulf Cup: 3rd
- Hazfi Cup: Semi-final
- Top goalscorer: League: Mehrzad Madanchi (10); All: Mehrzad Madanchi (11)
- Highest home attendance: 95,000 v Esteghlal (3 November 2006)
- Lowest home attendance: 7,000 v Rah Ahan (29 December 2006)
- Average home league attendance: 33,714
| Home colours | Away colours | Third colours |

The 2006–07 season was Persepolis's 6th season in the Pro League, and their 24th consecutive season in the top division of Iranian Football. They were also competing in the Hazfi Cup.

== Squad ==
=== Iran Pro League ===
Note: Flags indicate national team as defined under FIFA eligibility rules; some limited exceptions apply. Players may hold more than one non-FIFA nationality.

| No. | Pos. | Nation | Player |
|---|---|---|---|
| 2 | DF | IRI | Masoud Zarei |
| 3 | DF | IRI | Abolfazl Hajizadeh |
| 4 | DF | UAR | Tarek Jabban |
| 5 | DF | CZE | Robert Caha |
| 6 | MF | IRI | Karim Bagheri (captain) |
| 7 | MF | IRI | Mohammad Parvin |
| 8 | MF | IRI | Hossein Badamaki |
| 9 | MF | IRI | Hossein Kaebi |
| 10 | MF | IRI | Alireza Vahedi Nikbakht |
| 11 | FW | IRI | Mehrzad Madanchi |
| 12 | FW | IRI | Faraz Fatemi |
| 13 | DF | IRI | Sheys Rezaei |
| 14 | FW | IRI | Ehsan Khorsandi |
| 15 | MF | IRI | Mohammad Reza Mamani |
| 17 | MF | IRI | Farzad Ashoubi |

| No. | Pos. | Nation | Player |
|---|---|---|---|
| 18 | MF | IRI | Pejman Nouri |
| 19 | FW | IRQ | Luay Salah |
| 20 | MF | IRI | Davoud Seyed Abbasi |
| 21 | MF | IRI | Ebrahim Asadi (3rd-captain) |
| 22 | GK | IRI | Alireza Haghighi |
| 23 | FW | UAR | Zyad Chaabo |
| 25 | MF | CMR | Jacques Elong Elong |
| 26 | MF | IRI | Nima Ghavidel |
| 28 | MF | IRI | Amir Hossein Feshangchi |
| 29 | MF | IRI | Mostafa Mahdavikia |
| 30 | GK | IRI | Farshid Karimi (Vice-captain) |
| 31 | GK | IRI | Mehdi Vaezi |
| 32 | DF | IRI | Ahmad Ahi |
| 33 | FW | IRI | Mehrdad Oladi |
| 34 | FW | IRI | Hadi Norouzi |

== Persian Gulf Cup ==
=== Matches ===
| Date Round | Home | Score | Away | Location |

| 9 September 2006 1 | Aboumoslem | 3 – 2 | Persepolis | Mashhad |
| | R. Moslemzadeh 25'; M. Bargizar 33'; D. Olerum 62' | | H. Badamaki 18'; F. Fatemi 77' | Stadium: Takhti Stadium; Attendance: 32,000; Referee: Khodadad Afsharian |

| 17 September 2006 2 | Persepolis | 1 – 0 | Bargh Shiraz | Tehran |
| | L. Salah 30' | | | Stadium: Azadi Stadium; Attendance: 30,000; Referee: Rahim Rahimi Moghadam |

| 28 September 2006 4 | Persepolis | 4 – 0 | Esteghlal Ahvaz | Tehran |
| | M. Madanchi 30'; H. Badamaki 74'; A. Nikbakht 76', 80' | | | Stadium: Azadi Stadium; Attendance: 40,000; Referee: Mohsen Ghahremani |

| 2 October 2006 5 | Paykan | 0 – 2 | Persepolis | Tehran |
| | | | E. Khorsandi 16'; A. Nikbakht 42' | Stadium: Azadi Stadium; Attendance: 50,000; Referee: Mahmoud Rafiei |

| 17 October 2006 6 | Persepolis | 2 – 2 | Saipa | Tehran |
| | H. Farzaneh 21' (o.g.); F. Karimi (red card) 62'; H. Badamaki 90+3' | | A. Daei 43' (pen.), (penalty missed) 65', 83' | Stadium: Azadi Stadium; Attendance: 55,000; Referee: Navid Mozaffari |

| 22 October 2006 3 | Sepahan | 0 – 0 | Persepolis | Isfahan |
| | | | | Stadium: Naghsh-e-Jahan Stadium; Attendance: 10,000; Referee: Hedayat Mombeini |

| 27 October 2006 7 | Pas | 1 – 1 | Persepolis | Tehran |
| | Sh. Rezaei 2' (o.g.) | | M. Madanchi 8' | Stadium: Azadi Stadium; Attendance: 85,000; Referee: Mohsen Ghahremani |

| 3 November 2006 8 | Persepolis | 2 – 1 | Esteghlal | Tehran |
| | M. Madanchi 23'; M. Oladi 71' | | A. Sadeghi 16' | Stadium: Azadi Stadium; Attendance: 95,000; Referee: (Spain) Alfonso Pérez Burrull |

| 7 November 2006 9 | Mes Kerman | 0 – 0 | Persepolis | Kerman |
| | | | | Stadium: Shahid Bahonar Stadium; Attendance: 15,000; Referee: Masoud Moradi |

| 21 November 2006 10 | Persepolis | 2 – 2 | Moghavemat Sepasi | Tehran |
| | M. Oladi 12', 17' | | B. Tahmasebi 58'; E. Sasani 68' (pen.) | Stadium: Azadi Stadium; Attendance: 20,000; Referee: Khodadad Afsharian |

| 1 December 2006 11 | Foolad | 0 – 0 | Persepolis | Ahvaz |
| | | | | Stadium: Takhti Stadium; Attendance: 20,000; Referee: Mohsen Torki |

| 10 December 2006 12 | Persepolis | 1 – 0 | Saba Battery | Tehran |
| | M. Madanchi 51'; P. Nouri (red card) | | | Stadium: Azadi Stadium; Attendance: 15,000; Referee: Hedayat Mombeini |

| 18 December 2006 13 | Malavan | 0 – 0 | Persepolis | Anzali |
| | | | | Stadium: Takhti Stadium; Attendance: 15,000; Referee: Mahmoud Rafiei |

| 29 December 2006 14 | Persepolis | 1 – 2 | Rah Ahan | Tehran |
| | E. Khorsandi 44'; Sh. Rezaei (red card) 90+4' | | D. Haghi 7'; H. Asghari 81'; H. Shirkhanlou (red card) 84' | Stadium: Azadi Stadium; Attendance: 7,000; Referee: Masoud Moradi |

| 4 January 2007 15 | Zob Ahan | 2 – 3 | Persepolis | Fooladshahr |
| | M. Rajabzadeh 43', 83' | | M. Madanchi 26'; A. Nikbakht 36', (yellow card) (yellow-red card) 82'; H. Badamaki 40' | Stadium: Fooladshahr Stadium; Attendance: 15,000; Referee: Mohsen Torki |

| 25 January 2007 16 | Persepolis | 3 – 4 | Aboumoslem | Tehran |
| | M. Madanchi 14'; K. Bagheri 27' (pen.); J. Elong Elong (red card) 78'; E. Khorsandi 90+3' | | M. Mansouri 59' (red card) 88'; D. Olerum 69', 77', 87' | Stadium: Azadi Stadium; Attendance: NA; Referee: Rahim Rahimi Moghadam |

| 2 February 2007 17 | Bargh Shiraz | 1 – 2 | Persepolis | Shiraz |
| | M. Hashemi 45' | | E. Khorsandi 19'; F. Fatemi 90+2' | Stadium: Hafezieh Stadium; Attendance: 20,000; Referee: Hedayat Mombeini |

| 9 February 2007 18 | Persepolis | 2 – 1 | Sepahan | Tehran |
| | A. Hajizadeh 8'; M. Madanchi 89' | | M. Navidkia 78' | Stadium: Azadi Stadium; Attendance: 50,000; Referee: Mohsen Ghahremani |

| 17 February 2007 19 | Esteghlal Ahvaz | 1 – 0 | Persepolis | Ahvaz |
| | F. Fazli 13' | | | Stadium: Takhti Stadium; Attendance: 6,000; Referee: Saeid Mozaffarizadeh |

| 25 February 2007 20 | Persepolis | 3 – 4 | Paykan | Tehran |
| | M. Madanchi 59' (pen.); F. Fatemi 83'; K. Bagheri 90+1' | | M. Khosravi 13'; M. Bayatinia 25'; I. Heydari 48'; M. Tahmasebi 55' (pen.) | Stadium: Azadi Stadium; Attendance: 25,000; Referee: Mohsen Torki |

| 2 March 2007 21 | Saipa | 2 – 2 | Persepolis | Tehran |
| | A. Momenzadeh 19'; H. Karimi 84' | | A. Nikbakht 4'; M. Madanchi 90+2' (pen.) | Stadium: Azadi Stadium; Attendance: 60,000; Referee: Khodadad Afsharian |

| 19 March 2007 22 | Persepolis | 1 – 1 | Pas | Tehran |
| | Sh. Rezaei 85' | | O. Khouraj 22'; B. Koushki (red card) 66' | Stadium: Azadi Stadium; Attendance: 55,000; Referee: Rahim Rahimi Moghadam |

| 30 March 2007 23 | Esteghlal | 1 – 1 | Persepolis | Tehran |
| | A. Alizadeh 43' | | M. Madanchi (penalty missed) 11'; A. Nikbakht 13' | Stadium: Azadi Stadium; Attendance: 95,000; Referee: (Germany) Felix Brych |

| 6 April 2007 24 | Persepolis | 4 – 1 | Mes Kerman | Tehran |
| | A. Nikbakht 27'; H. Kaebi 56'; P. Nouri 67'; Z. Chaabo 73' | | S. Mirghorbani 81' | Stadium: Azadi Stadium; Attendance: 20,000; Referee: Hedayat Mombeyni |

| 15 April 2007 25 | Moghavemat Sepasi | 1 – 1 | Persepolis | Shiraz |
| | R. Khaleghifar 63' | | F. Ashoubi 80'; P. Nouri (yellow card) (yellow-red card) 74' | Stadium: Hafezieh Stadium; Attendance: 20,000; Referee: Ahmad Salehi |

| 22 April 2007 26 | Persepolis | 2 – 1 | Foolad | Tehran |
| | H. Kaebi 17'; H. Badamaki 39' | | P. Montazeri 47' | Stadium: Azadi Stadium; Attendance: 15,000; Referee: Mphsen Ghahremani |

| 29 April 2007 27 | Saba Battery | 0 – 1 | Persepolis | Tehran |
| | S. Bakhtiarizadeh (red card) 40' | | F. Ashoubi 31' (pen.) | Stadium: Azadi Stadium; Attendance: 20,000; Referee: Mohsen Torki |

| 4 May 2007 28 | Persepolis | 1 – 0 | Malavan | Tehran |
| | H. Kaebi 17' | | | Stadium: Azadi Stadium; Attendance: 25,000; Referee: Rahim Rahimi Moghadam |

| 18 May 2007 29 | Rah Ahan | 1 – 2 | Persepolis | Tehran |
| | M. Tartar 20'; M. Varnakesh (red card) 90+1' | | A. Nikbakht 4'; P. Nouri 84' | Stadium: Azadi Stadium; Attendance: 25,000; Referee: Navid Mozaffari |

| 27 May 2007 30 | Persepolis | 3 – 1 | Zob Ahan | Tehran |
| | M. Madanchi 4'; Z. Chaabo 85'; A. Hajizadeh 90+1' | | A. Tahmasebi 77' | Stadium: Azadi Stadium; Attendance: 20,000; Referee: Yadollah Jahanbazi |

==== Score overview ====
Win Draw Loss

| Opposition | Home score | Away score | Aggregate score |
|---|---|---|---|
| Aboomoslem | 3–4 | 3–2 | 5–7 |
| Bargh Shiraz | 1–0 | 1–2 | 3–1 |
| Esteghlal | 2–1 | 1–1 | 3–2 |
| Esteghlal Ahvaz | 4–0 | 1–0 | 4–1 |
| Foolad | 2–1 | 0–0 | 2–1 |
| Malavan | 1–0 | 0–0 | 1–0 |
| Mes Kerman | 4–1 | 0–0 | 4–1 |
| Moghavemat | 2–2 | 1–1 | 3–3 |
| PAS | 1–1 | 1–1 | 2–2 |
| Paykan | 3–4 | 0–2 | 5–4 |
| Rah Ahan | 1–2 | 1–2 | 3–3 |
| Saba Battery | 1–0 | 0–1 | 2–0 |
| Saipa | 2–2 | 2–2 | 4–4 |
| Sepahan | 2–1 | 0–0 | 2–1 |
| Zob Ahan | 3–1 | 2–3 | 6–3 |

=== Results by round ===
| Round | 1 | 2 | 3 | 4 | 5 | 6 | 7 | 8 | 9 | 10 | 11 | 12 | 13 | 14 | 15 | 16 | 17 | 18 | 19 | 20 | 21 | 22 | 23 | 24 | 25 | 26 | 27 | 28 | 29 | 30 |
|---|---|---|---|---|---|---|---|---|---|---|---|---|---|---|---|---|---|---|---|---|---|---|---|---|---|---|---|---|---|---|
| Ground | A | H | A | H | A | H | A | H | A | H | A | H | A | H | A | H | A | H | A | H | A | H | A | H | A | H | A | H | A | H |
| Result | L | W | D | W | W | D | D | W | D | D | D | W | D | L | W | L | W | W | L | L | D | D | D | W | D | W | W | W | W | W |

Updated to match(es) played on 27 May 2007. Source: "Ipl".
A = Away; H = Home; W = Win; D = Draw; L = Loss

=== Results summary ===
| Overall | | | | | | | | Home | | | | | | Away | | | | | |
| Pld | W | D | L | GF | GA | GD | Pts | W | D | L | GF | GA | GD | W | D | L | GF | GA | GD |
|---|---|---|---|---|---|---|---|---|---|---|---|---|---|---|---|---|---|---|---|
| 30 | 14 | 11 | 5 | 49 | 33 | +16 | 53 | 9 | 3 | 3 | 32 | 20 | +12 | 5 | 8 | 2 | 17 | 13 | +4 |

| | GP | W | D | L | Pts | GF | GA | GD |
|---|---|---|---|---|---|---|---|---|
| In Azadi Studium | 21 | 12 | 6 | 3 | 42 | 41 | 25 | +16 |
| In Other Studiums | 9 | 2 | 5 | 2 | 11 | 8 | 8 | - |

Last updated: 27 May 2007.
Source: "Ipl".

== League standings ==
| Pos | Team | Pld | W | D | L | GF | GA | GD | Pts | Promotion or relegation |
|---|---|---|---|---|---|---|---|---|---|---|
| 1 | Saipa (C) | 30 | 15 | 11 | 4 | 45 | 31 | +14 | 56 | Qualification for the AFC Champions League 2008 |
| 2 | Est. Ahvaz | 30 | 16 | 6 | 8 | 33 | 28 | +5 | 54 | |
| 3 | Persepolis | 30 | 14 | 11 | 5 | 49 | 33 | +16 | 53 | |
| 4 | Esteghlal | 30 | 14 | 10 | 6 | 39 | 30 | +9 | 52 | |
| 5 | Sepahan | 30 | 14 | 7 | 9 | 41 | 28 | +13 | 49 | Qualification for the AFC Champions League 2008 |

Updated to match(es) played on May 27, 2007. Source:
Rules for classification: 1) points; 2) goal difference; 3) number of goals scored.
(C) Champions

=== Persepolis goalscorers in Pro League ===
| Scorer | Goals |
|---|---|
| (Iran) Mehrzad Madanchi | 10 |
| (Iran) Alireza Vahedi Nikbakht | 8 |
| (Iran) Hossein Badamaki | 5 |
| (Iran) Ehsan Khorsandi | 4 |
| (Iran) Faraz Fatemi | 3 |
| (Iran) Hossein Kaebi | 3 |
| (Iran) Mehrdad Oladi | 3 |
| (Syria) Zyad Chaabo | 2 |
| (Iran) Pejman Nouri | 2 |
| (Iran) Abolfazl Hajizadeh | 2 |
| (Iran) Karim Bagheri | 2 |
| (Iran) Farzad Ashoobi | 2 |
| (Iraq) Louay Salah Hassan | 1 |
| (Iran) Sheys Rezaei | 1 |
| Own Goals | 1 |
| Total goals scored | 49 |

== Hazfi Cup ==
=== Matches ===
| Date Round | Home | Score | Away | Location |

| 25 December 2006 R32 | Sanati Kaveh | 2 – 4 | Persepolis | Tehran |
| | E. Akhtar 75'; H. Shahbazi 90+3' | | E. Khorsandi 12', 73'; L. Salah 68'; M. Madanchi 77' (pen.) | Stadium: Azadi Stadium |

| 13 February 2007 R16 | Persepolis | 2 – 0 | Moghavemat Basij Fars | Tehran |
| | A. Nikbakht 16'; E. Khorsandi 90+3' | | | Stadium: Azadi Stadium |

| 8 March 2007 Quarter-final | Bargh Tehran | 2 – 2 (a.e.t.) (3 – 5 p) | Persepolis | Tehran |
| | M. Najmizadeh 77'; Y. Pourmohsen 101' | | Z. Chaabo 33'; A. Nikbakht 93' | Stadium: Azadi Stadium |
| | Penalties |
| | A. Salamibakhsh (penalty scored); M. Fathi (penalty scored); J. Yadegari (penalty scored); M. Mohammadzadeh (penalty missed) | | (penalty scored) K. Bagheri; (penalty scored) F. Ashoubi; (penalty scored) M. Madanchi; (penalty scored) E. Asadi; (penalty scored) H. Badamaki |

| 1 June 2007 Semi-final | Persepolis | 1 – 4 (a.e.t.) | Sepahan | Tehran |
| | F. Ashoubi 63' (pen.) | | H. Aghily 87' (pen.); M. Karimi 108', 111', 117'; J. Mujiri (red card) 113'; A. Abu Al-Hail (red card) 114' | Stadium: Azadi Stadium; Attendance: 100,000; Referee: Mohsen Ghahremani |

=== Persepolis goalscorers in Hazfi Cup ===
| Scorer | Goals |
|---|---|
| (Iran) Ehsan Khorsandi | 3 |
| (Iran) Alireza Vahedi Nikbakht | 2 |
| (Iraq) Louay Salah Hassan | 1 |
| (Iran) Mehrzad Madanchi | 1 |
| (Syria) Zyad Chaabo | 1 |
| (Iran) Farzad Ashoobi | 1 |
| Total goals scored | 9 |

== Goalkeeping ==
| | | | League | | | Hazfi | | | Total | | |
| No | N | Name | M | GA | CS | M | GA | CS | M | GA | CS |
|---|---|---|---|---|---|---|---|---|---|---|---|
| 30 | (Iran) | Farshid Karimi | 21 | 21 | 8 | 2 | 4 | 1 | 23 | 25 | 9 |
| 22 | (Iran) | Alireza Haghighi | 4 | 2 | 2 | – | – | – | 4 | 2 | 2 |
| 31 | (Iran) | Mehdi Vaezi | 6 | 10 | 0 | 2 | 4 | 0 | 8 | 14 | 0 |
| Total | | | 31* | 33 | 10 | 4 | 8 | 1 | 35 | 41 | 11 |
Last updated: 31 August 2020

- In the first-leg match against Saipa in the league, Farshid Karimi was sent off in the second half, and Alireza Haghighi came on as a substitute.

== Club ==
=== Kit ===
Supplier: Hessari
Sponsor(s): ECUT, Irancell

| Home Kit | Away Kit | Third Kit |

=== Club managers ===
| Position | Name | Nat |
|---|---|---|
| Head coach | Mustafa Denizli | (Turkey) |
| First team coach | Hamid Estili | (Iran) |
| Analyser & Turkish Translator | Naser Sadeghi | (Iran) (Turkey) |
| Goalkeeping coach | Ali Nuroddin | (Turkey) |
| Team doctor | Dr.Farid Zarineh | (Iran) |
| Massager | Morteza Mohseni | (Iran) |

=== Club officials ===
| Position | Name |
|---|---|
| President | (Iran) Mohammad Hassan Ansarifar |
| Ground (capacity and dimensions) | Azadi Stadium (90,000 / 100 x 60 m) |
