= 2006 Hazfi Cup final =

- Event: 2005-06 Hazfi Cup
Persepolis	Sepahan
2	2
- Sepahan won 4–2 on penalties

First leg
Persepolis	Sepahan
1	1
- Date: September 13, 2006
- Venue: Azadi Stadium, Tehran
- Referee: Mohsen Torky
- Attendance: 80,000

Second leg
Sepahan	Persepolis
1	1
- Date: September 22, 2006
- Venue: Naghsh Jahan Stadium, Esfahan
- Referee: Masoud Moradi
- Attendance: 35,000

The 2006 Hazfi Cup final was a two-legged football tie in order to determine the 2005–06 Hazfi Cup champion of Iranian football clubs. Persepolis faced Sepahan in this final game. The first leg took place on September 13, 2006 at 17:40 local time (UTC+3:30) at Azadi Stadium in Tehran and the second leg took place on September 22, 2006 at 15:00 local time (UTC+3:30) at Naghsh Jahan Stadium, Esfahan.

== Format ==
The rules for the final were exactly the same as the one in the previous knockout rounds. The tie was contested over two legs with away goals deciding the winner if the two teams were level on goals after the second leg. If the teams could still not be separated at that stage, then extra time would have been played with a penalty shootout (taking place if the teams were still level after extra time).

== Route to the final ==
Perspolis				Round	Sepahan
Opponent	Result	H/A	Perspolis goalscorers	Second stage	Opponent	Result	H/A	Sepahan goalscorers
Keshto Sannat Shushtar	2–0	H	Davoud Seyed Abbasi, Sheys Rezaei	1/16 Final	Mes Kerman	2–1	H	Rasoul Khatibi (2)
Aboomoslem	3–2	A	Mehrzad Madanchi (3)	1/8 Final	Pas Tehran	0–0 (4-3)	A	-
Malavan	3–1	H	Pejman Nouri, Mehrzad Madanchi (2)	Quarter-Final	Tractor Sazi	1–0	H	Mohammad Nouri
Nozhan	2–2 (7-6)	A	Mehrzad Madanchi (2)	Semi-Final	Saba Batri	3–1	A	Mohammad Nouri, Jalal Akbari, Mahmoud Mansouri

== Final Summary ==
Team 1	Agg.	Team 2	1st leg	2nd leg
Persepolis	2-2	Sepahan	1-1	1-1

=== First leg ===
13 September 2006
17:40

Persepolis	1 - 1	Sepahan
Alireza Vahedi Nikbakht 45+3'	Report	Hamid Shafiei 73'

Tehran, Azadi Stadium
Attendance: 80,000
Referee: Mohsen Torky

Persepolis:
GK	1	(Iran) Farshid Karimi
DF	13	(Iran) Sheys Rezaei		Temporarily suspended
DF	3	(Iran) Abolfazl Hajizadeh
DF	25	(Cameroon) Jacques Elong Elong			(substituted off) 76'
MF	21	(Iran) Ebrahim Asadi			(substituted off) 46'
MF	8	(Iran) Hossein Badamaki
MF	18	(Iran) Pejman Nouri
MF	17	(Iran) Farzad Ashoubi
MF	15	(Iran) Mohammad Reza Mamani		Temporarily suspended	(substituted off) 59'
MF	11	(Iran) Mehrzad Madanchi			(substituted off) 69'
MF	10	(Iran) Alireza Vahedi Nikbakht	45+3'
Substitutes:
DF	5	(Czech Republic) Robert Caha			(substituted on) 46'
MF	20	(Iran) Davoud Seyed Abbasi			(substituted on) 59'
MF	2	(Iran) Masoud Zarei		Temporarily suspended	(substituted on) 76'
Manager:
(Turkey) Mustafa Denizli

Sepahan:
GK	1	(Armenia) Armenak Petrosyan
DF	(Iran) Mohsen Bengar
DF	(Iran) Hamid Azizzadeh
DF	(Iran) Hadi Aghily
DF	(Iran) Jalal Akbari	Temporarily suspended
MF	(Iran) Moharram Navidkia	(substituted off) 68'
MF	(Iraq) Abdul Wahab Abu Al Hail	Temporarily suspended
MF	(Iran) Hadi Jafari
MF	(Iran) Ebrahim Loveinian
FW	(Iran) Hamid Shafiei	73'	(substituted off) 82'
FW	(Iran) Mehdi Seyed Salehi	(substituted off) 46'
Substitutes:
MF	(Iran) Mohammad Nouri	(substituted on) 46'
FW	(Iraq) Emad Mohammed Ridha	(substituted on) 68'
MF	(Iran) Javad Maheri	(substituted on) 82'
Manager:
(Croatia) Luka Bonačić

=== Second leg ===
22 September 2006
15:00

Sepahan	1 - 1 (a.e.t.)	Persepolis
Hamid Shafiei 63'	Report	Ebrahim Asadi 55'
Penalties
Jalal Akbari (penalty missed); Hadi Aghily (penalty scored); Moharram Navidkia (penalty scored); Abdul Wahab Abu Al Hail (penalty scored); Emad Mohammed Ridha (penalty scored)	4 - 2	(penalty scored) Karim Bagheri; (penalty missed) Sheys Rezaei; (penalty missed) Alireza Vahedi Nikbakht; (penalty scored) Abolfazl Hajizadeh

Esfahan, Naghsh-e-Jahan Stadium
Attendance: 35,000
Referee: Masoud Moradi

Sepahan:
GK	1	(Armenia) Armenak Petrosyan
DF	(Iran) Hadi Aghily
DF	(Iran) Mohsen Bengar
DF	(Iran) Hamid Azizzadeh
DF	(Iran) Jalal Akbari
MF	(Iran) Ebrahim Loveinian
MF	(Iraq) Abdul Wahab Abu Al Hail	Temporarily suspended
MF	(Iran) Hadi Jafari	(substituted off) 76'
MF	(Iran) Mohammad Nouri	(substituted off) 46'
FW	(Iran) Hamid Shafiei	63'	(substituted off) 78'
FW	(Iraq) Emad Mohammed Ridha
Substitutes:
MF	(Iran) Moharram Navidkia	(substituted on) 46'
MF	(Iran) Javad Maheri	(substituted on) 76'
MF	(Iran) Mahmoud Karimi	(substituted on) 78'
Manager:
(Croatia) Luka Bonačić

Persepolis:
GK	1	(Iran) Farshid Karimi
DF	3	(Iran) Abolfazl Hajizadeh
DF	13	(Iran) Sheys Rezaei
DF	25	(Cameroon) Jacques Elong Elong
MF	6	(Iran) Karim Bagheri
MF	18	(Iran) Pejman Nouri		Temporarily suspended	(substituted off) 115'
MF	17	(Iran) Farzad Ashoubi
MF	21	(Iran) Ebrahim Asadi	56'		(substituted off) 71'
MF	10	(Iran) Alireza Vahedi Nikbakht		Temporarily suspended
FW	19	(Iraq) Luay Salah Hassan			(substituted off) 80'
MF	11	(Iran) Mehrzad Madanchi			(substituted off) 69'
Substitutes:
DF	5	(Czech Republic) Robert Caha			(substituted on) 115'
MF	8	(Iran) Hossein Badamaki		Temporarily suspended	(substituted on) 71'
FW	14	(Iran) Ehsan Khorsandi		Temporarily suspended	(substituted on) 80'
Manager:
(Turkey) Mustafa Denizli

== Champions ==
Champions 2005–06 Hazfi Cup

Second title

== See also ==
- 2005–06 Iran Pro League
- 2005–06 Azadegan League
- 2005–06 Iran Football's 2nd Division
- 2005–06 Iran Football's 3rd Division
- 2005–06 Hazfi Cup
- 2005–06 Iranian Futsal Super League
- Iranian Super Cup
