= 2005–06 Hazfi Cup =

Tournament details
- Country: Iran
- Teams: 32

Final positions
- Champions: Sepahan (2nd title)
- Runners-up: Persepolis

Tournament statistics
- Matches played: 32
- Goals scored: 68 (2.13 per match)

The 2005–06 Hazfi Cup was the 19th staging of Iran's football knockout competition organised annually by the Football Federation Islamic Republic of Iran.

Saba Qom were the defending champions. They were knocked out in the semi-finals, losing 3–1 to the eventual champions Sepahan.

== First round ==
23 January 2006	Saba Tehran	2–1	Kowsar Tehran
	Akbari 15'; Bakhtiarizadeh 35'	Report	Solhjo 75'

23 January 2006	Bargh Shiraz	0–0 (2–4 p)	Paykan
		Report

23 January 2006	Fajr Tabriz	0–1	PAS Tehran
		Report	Shakouri 76'

23 January 2006	Nassaji Mazandaran	1–3	Malavan
	Ziyatabar 66'	Report	Khavandi 16'; Gholami 72'; Gilemardi 86'

23 January 2006	Saipa	0–2	Teraktor Sazi
		Report	Karimi 43'; Farshbaf 65'

23 January 2006	Maziran Sari	0–1	Fajr Sepasi Shiraz
		Report	Ramazani 65'

23 January 2006	Zob Ahan Esfahan	2–1	Vahadat Abadan
	Rodriguez 11', 80'	Report	Hotizadeh 75'

23 January 2006	Sepahan	2–1	Sanat Mes Kerman
	Khatibi 53', 75'	Report	Sozamora 21'

23 January 2006	Esteghlal	2–0	Etka Tehran
	Nikbakht 75'; Enayati 89'	Report

23 January 2006	Esteghlal Ahvaz	1–0	Payam Mokhaberat Shiraz
	Sabet 90+6'	Report

23 January 2006	Bargh Tehran	(w/o); Awarded (Note: Bargh Tehran withdrew.)	Aboomoslem
		Report

23 January 2006	Sanay Arak	(w/o); Awarded (Note: Shamoushak Noshahr withdrew.)	Shamoushak Noshahr
		Report

23 January 2006	Nozhan Sari	2–1 (6–5 p)	Foolad
		Report

30 January 2006	Sepahan Novin	2–1	Shahid Ghandi Yazd
	Bello 50'; Hamzehei 53'	Report	Rashki 70'

31 January 2006	Shahin Bushehr	3–1	Rah Ahan Tehran
	Halali 40'; Nazarzadeh 49'; Jamhiri 63'	Report	Asghari 47'

5 March 2006	Persepolis	2–0
		Report	Seyed-Abbasi 39'; Rezai 85'

== Round of 16 ==
3 March 2006	Saba Tehran	2–1	Sanaye Arak
	Zoualrahmi 57', 71'	Report	Haydari 63'

7 March 2006	Nozhan Sari	2–1	Zob Ahan Esfahan
	Pourhaji 50'; Aeenevand 65'	Report	Farhadi 16'

7 March 2006	Malavan	3–2 (a.e.t.)	Paykan
	Giahi 31'; Gholami 90'; Khavandi 97'	Report	Barreto 57'; Aziz-Mohammadi 89'

7 March 2006	Teraktor Sazi	1–0; Abandoned (Note: Maziran walked off protesting a penalty awarded against them.)	Maziran Sari
		Report

7 March 2006	Payam Mokhaberat Shiraz	0–1	Sepahan Novin
		Report	Bello 65'

13 March 2006	PAS Tehran	0–0 (a.e.t.) (3–4 p)	Sepahan
		Report

25 April 2006	Esteghlal	(w/o); Awarded	Shahin Bushehr
		Report

25 April 2006	Aboomoslem	2–3	Persepolis
	Geraeili 42', 58'	Report	Madanchi 13', 34', 71'

== Quarter-finals ==
4 April 2006	Sepahan Novin	1–2 (a.e.t.)	Saba Tehran
	Mirfenderski 82'	Report	Daei 1', 107'

28 April 2006	Sepahan	1–0	Teraktor Sazi
	Nouri 22'	Report

28 April 2006	Nozhan Sari	(w/o); Awarded (Note: Esteghlal withdrew after winning the league.)	Esteghlal
		Report

29 April 2006	Persepolis	3–1	Malavan
	Pejman Nouri 40'; Madanchi 70', 87'	Report	Zare 71'

== Semi-finals ==
29 April 2006	Nozhan Sari	2–2 (a.e.t.) (6–7 p)	Persepolis
	Pourhaji 45+3'; Mehdizadeh 90+7'	Report	Madanchi 41', 90' (pen.)

29 April 2006	Saba Tehran	1–3	Sepahan
	Bakhtiarizadeh 78'	Report	Nouri 40'; Akbari 73'; Mansouri 90+2'

== Final ==
Team 1	Agg.	Team 2	1st leg	2nd leg
Persepolis	2–2	Sepahan	1–1	1–1

=== First leg ===
13 September 2006
17:40

Persepolis	1–1	Sepahan
Nikbakht 45+3'	Report	Shafiei 73'

Tehran, Azadi Stadium
Attendance: 80,000
Referee: Mohsen Torky

=== Second leg ===
22 September 2006
15:00

Sepahan	1–1 (a.e.t.)	Persepolis
Shafiei 63'	Report	Asadi 55'
Penalties
Aghily (penalty scored); Akbari (penalty missed); Navidkia (penalty scored); Abu Al-Hail (penalty scored); Ridha (penalty scored)	4–2	(penalty scored) Bagheri; (penalty scored) Hajizadeh; (penalty missed) Rezaei; (penalty missed) Nikbakht

Esfahan, Naghsh-e-Jahan Stadium
Attendance: 35,000
Referee: Masoud Moradi

== See also ==
- 2006 Hazfi Cup Final
- 2005–06 Iran Pro League
- 2005–06 Azadegan League
- 2005–06 Iran Football's 2nd Division
- 2005–06 Iran Football's 3rd Division
- 2005–06 Iranian Futsal Super League
- Iranian Super Cup
