= Ali Mobaraki =

Personal information
- Date of birth: July 24, 1994 (age 32)
- Place of birth: Nishapur, Iran
- Height: 1.87 m (6 ft 2 in)
- Position: Defensive midfielder

Team information
- Current team: Chwarqurna
- Number: 6

Youth career
- Malavan
- Tractor

Senior career*
Years	Team	Apps	(Gls)
2013–2015	Malavan	15	(2)
2016–2017	Sepahan	10	(0)
2020–2022	Khazar Lankaran FK	16	(2)
2024–	Chwarqurna	10	(0)
- * Club domestic league appearances and goals

Ali Mobaraki (born 24 July 1994 in Nishapur) is an Iranian professional footballer who plays as a defensive midfielder for Iraqi club Chwarqurna.

He has previously played for several Iranian clubs, including Malavan Bandar Anzali, Sepahan Isfahan and Tractor Tabriz.

== Career ==
=== Early career and entry into the Persian Gulf Pro League ===
After spending three successful years at Babak Mashhad, Mobaraki joined Malavan F.C. in 2013. He spent two impressive seasons at the club, playing alongside Saeid Ezatolahi, Maziar Zare and Pejman Nouri.

=== Sepahan and Tractor ===
In 2016, Mobaraki joined Sepahan Isfahan, which was managed by Zlatko Kranjčar. In 2018, he moved to Tractor's under-23 team, where he spent two seasons.

=== Azerbaijan Alliance ===
From 2020 to 2022, Mobaraki played for Azerbaijan Alliance in the Azerbaijan Premier League.

=== Chwarqurna ===
In 2024, Mobaraki joined Iraqi club Chwarqurna on a two-year contract to compete in the Iraqi Premier League.

== Honours ==
- Iranian Youth Regional League Champion (2014) – Malavan
- Runner-up in the Persian Gulf Pro League (2016) – Sepahan
- Iraqi Premier League Cup runner-up – Chwarqurna
