= Reza Niknazar =

Iranian footballer

Personal information
- Full name: Reza Niknazar
- Date of birth: 23 August 1980 (age 46)
- Place of birth: Rasht, Iran
- Position: Defender

Team information
- Current team: Sanat Naft Abadan F.C.
- Number: 33

Youth career
- Sepidrood

Senior career*
Years	Team	Apps	(Gls)
- Sepidrood
2004–2005	Saba Battery	24	(1)
2005–2006	Persepolis	6	(0)
2006–2008	Malavan	52	(6)
2008–2009	Damash Gilan	11	(0)
2009–2010	Nassaji	9	(2)
2010–2011	Sepidrood	11	(2)
2012–2013	Iran khodro Shaft		
2013–	Sanat Naft Abadan F.C.	4	(0)
- * Club domestic league appearances and goals as of June 30, 2013

Reza Niknazar (Persian: رضا نيک‌نظر; born 23 August 1980 in Rasht) is an Iranian football player who is currently a free agent. He usually plays at defender position. He played his golden years for Malavan in Iran Pro League.
