= Alireza Haghighi =

Iranian footballer (born 1988)

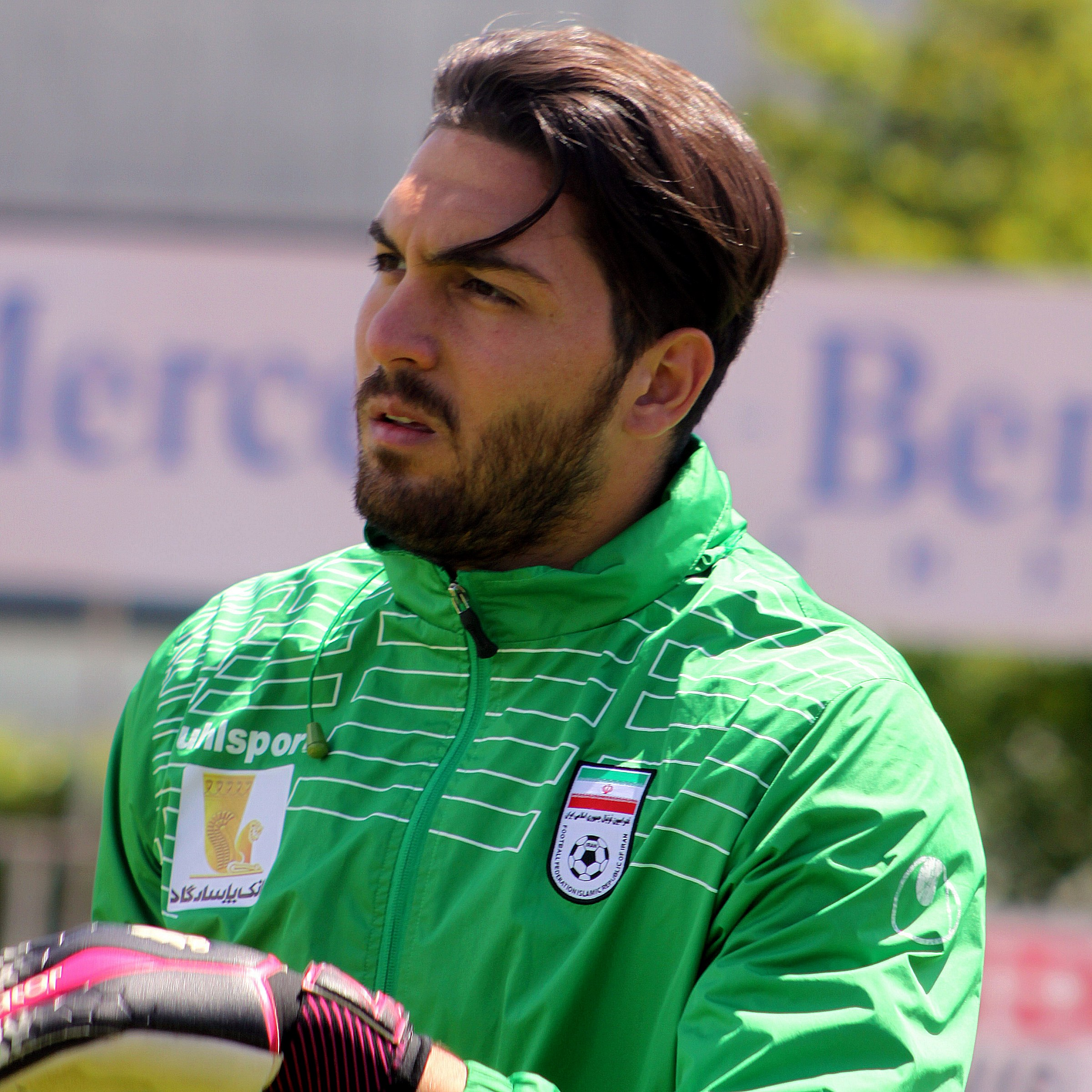
- Haghighi with Iran in 2014

Personal information
- Date of birth: 2 May 1988 (age 38)
- Place of birth: Tehran, Iran
- Height: 1.93 m (6 ft 4 in)
- Position: Goalkeeper

Youth career
- 2001–2002: Saipa
- 2002–2007: Persepolis

Senior career*
Years	Team	Apps	(Gls)
2006–2012	Persepolis	73	(0)
2012–2016	Rubin Kazan	0	(0)
2013	→ Persepolis (loan)	0	(0)
2014	→ Sporting Covilhã (loan)	12	(0)
2014–2015	→ Penafiel (loan)	22	(0)
2016	Marítimo	4	(0)
2017	Eskilstuna	17	(0)
2018	Sundsvall	0	(0)
2019–2020	Nassaji	21	(0)
2020–2021	Gol Gohar Sirjan	18	(0)
2021–2023	Nassaji	57	(0)
2023–2024	Havadar	27	(0)
2025	Kheybar	2	(0)
2025	Sanat Naft	5	(0)

International career^{‡}
2002–2003	Iran U15		
2004–2005	Iran U17	5	(0)
2005–2006	Iran U20	6	(0)
2006–2010	Iran U23	4	(0)
2010–2017	Iran	25	(0)
Medal record
Representing Iran
Asian Games
Bronze medal – third place	2006 Qatar	Team competition
- * Club domestic league appearances and goals as of 17 April 2025 ‡ National team caps and goals as of 10:23, 3 July 2022 (UTC)

Alireza Haghighi (Persian: علیرضا حقیقی; born 6 May 1988) is an Iranian former professional footballer who played as a goalkeeper.

== Club career ==
=== Persepolis ===
Having joined the senior squad of Persepolis at the age of 16, he made his debut in the match against Saipa on 17 October 2006. He saved a very important penalty against the legendary Ali Daei. Haghighi had been playing for Persepolis Youth teams since 2002, after being scouted by coaches of Persepolis Football School in the past years. He started the 2007–08 season with two other goalkeepers already ahead of him in the pecking order at Persepolis (Hassan Roudbarian, Team Melli's number one and Mehdi Vaezi, who was also invited to the national team, but never capped). During this season, Haghighi did not play at all but extended his contract at the end of the season.

During the 2008–09 season, Haghighi was lucky to play in every game because of injuries to two other goalkeepers, making Haghighi the first keeper for every game. Statistically, he was the number-one keeper during this season. He trained under legendary Iranian keeper Ahmad Reza Abedzadeh.

In the 2007–08 season, he captained Persepolis for the first time in the 2–1 victory against Saipa, making him the youngest captain of Persepolis in its history.

=== Rubin Kazan ===
In December 2011, Russian Premier League side Rubin Kazan sent a transfer request to Persepolis. He officially left Persepolis on 9 January 2012. On 14 January 2012, Haghighi signed a 4-year deal with Rubin Kazan. He signed a contract with the Russian club on 11 January and made his debut three days later in a pre-season friendly match.

=== Return to Persepolis (loan) ===
On 18 July 2013, Haghighi returned to Persepolis and signed a six-month loan contract with the club. On 23 October 2013, Haghighi played in a 5–1 win over Padideh Shandiz in a Hazfi Cup match, marking his first match for Persepolis after 18 months. He then played another Hazfi Cup match against Alvand Hamedan, in which he kept a clean sheet.

His loan contract ended on 3 December 2013.

=== Sporting Covilhã (loan) ===
Haghighi was called back to the Rubin Kazan side during the 2014 winter transfer period. In January 2014, Haghighi signed a loan contract with Portuguese Segunda Liga side Sporting Covilhã, on loan from Rubin Kazan. With Haghighi in the net, Sporting Covilha avoided relegation. After 14 appearances with the club, Haghighi's loan contract ended and he returned to Rubin.

=== Penafiel (loan) ===
On 24 August 2014, Haghighi signed a one-year loan contract with Primeira Liga side Penafiel. They won their first game on 20 September against Vitória with Haghighi keeping a clean sheet in their 2–0 win. On 24 February 2015 Haghighi was named the Primeira Liga Player of the Week for Matchday 22 after his clean sheet in a 1–0 victory against Vitórial. After his good performances at Penafiel, Sporting Braga became interested in Haghighi.

=== Return to Rubin Kazan ===
Haghighi returned to Rubin for the 2015–16 season. He played in a pre-season friendly on 8 July 2015 against Karlsruher SC in a match that finished 2–2. He played his first official game for Rubin on 24 September 2015 in a Russian Cup game against FC SKA-Energiya Khabarovsk which his team lost 0–2.

=== Marítimo ===
On 22 January 2016, Haghighi signed a 30-month contract with Marítimo in the Primeira Liga, reuniting with his former coach, Nelo Vingada. Haghighi received his ITC on 27 January 2016 and was cleared to play for the club. Haghighi made his league debut for Marítimo on 14 February 2016 against S.C. Braga. Haghighi kept his first clean–sheet for the club on 28 February 2016 in a 1–0 victory against Académica. Marítimo and Haghighi agreed to terminate his contract on 20 August 2016.

=== AFC Eskilstuna ===
On 13 March 2017, he signed a one-year contract with the Swedish club AFC Eskilstuna, competing in the top tier Allsvenskan. However shortly after joining the team he suffered a major injury and was ruled out for several months. Haghighi returned to training in late June 2017. Alireza finally debuted on 8 July 2017 in a 1–0 loss to Sirius.

Haghighi was named in an Allsvenskan team of the week in August after great performances since his return from injury, and on 19 August 2017 he assisted a goal in his team's 3–1 victory against Malmö.

=== GIF Sundsvall ===
On 13 March 2018, he signed a contract with another Swedish club GIF Sundsvall, competing in the top tier Allsvenskan. The duration of his contract was 3 months, until the end of the 2018 FIFA World Cup. He was released from the team on 11 May 2018.

== International career ==
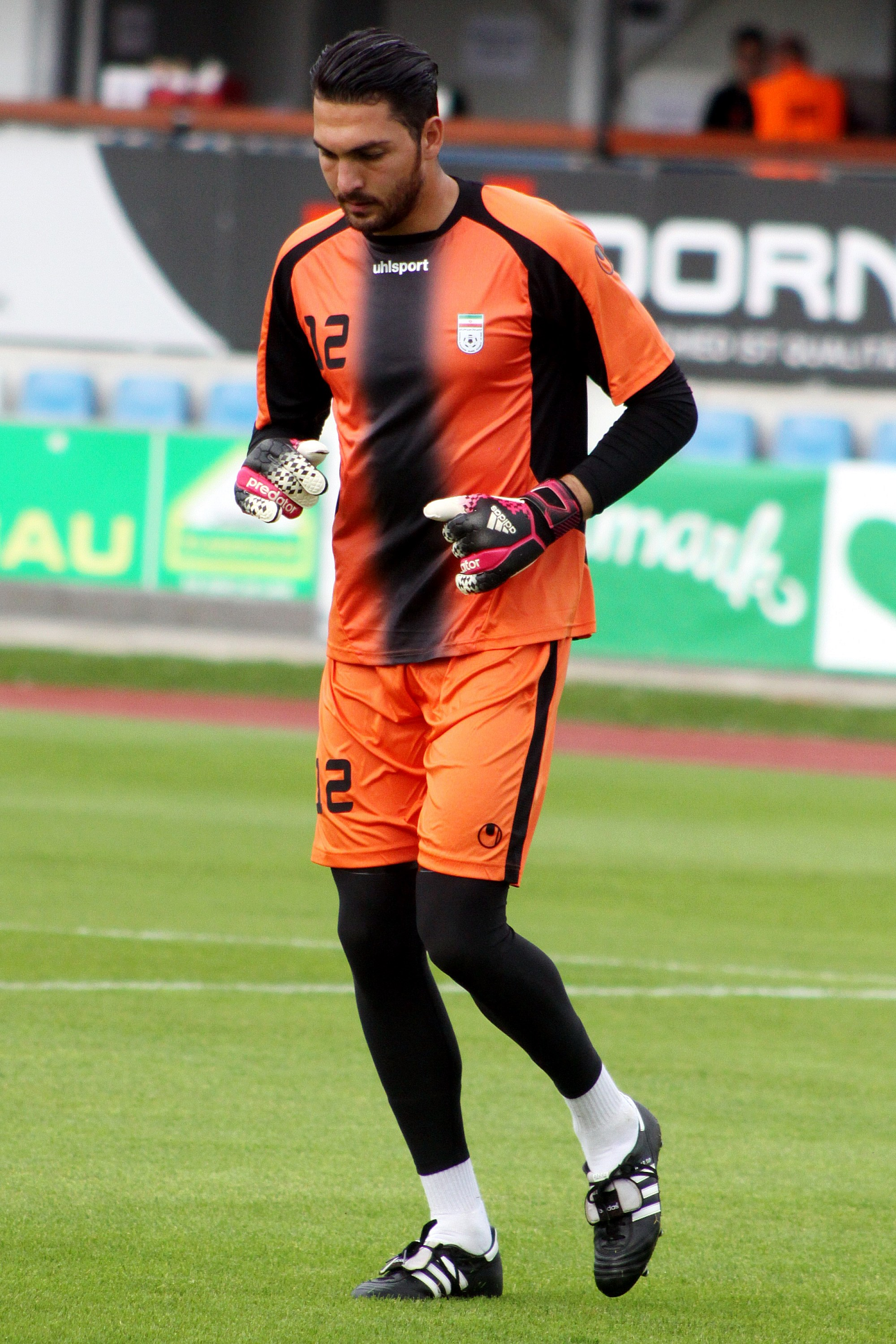
Haghighi before the match against Montenegro, 26 May 2014

=== Youth teams ===
Haghighi led Iran to the finals of the West Asian U-15 tournament, held in Qatar in 2002, He was the first keeper of Iran U-17 at the 2004 AFC U-17 Championship, also playing all three games for Iran U-20 at the 2006 AFC Youth Championship. He made three appearances in the 2005 Valentin A.Granatkin Memorial – International Youth Tournament for Iran U20.

=== Olympic team ===
Haghighi was invited to Iran U23 in the Asian Games 2006, although he did not play any matches. He did not play in the 2008 AFC Men's Pre-Olympic Tournament and Sosha Makani was the first choice. Under Gholam Peyrovani's management of Iran U23, He was invited again; but missed many trainings and friendly matches of Iran U23, including Tehran 6-Team Tournament, South Africa Camp, and a friendly match against Poland. Peyrovani did not invite Haghighi for the 2010 Guangzhou Asian Games stating "he is too old to play in the 2012 London Olympics", despite inviting 28-year-old Mehdi Rahmati as a Wild Card player. Peyrovani also rejected having any problems with Haghighi.

=== Senior team ===
Haghighi was called up to the Iran national football team in 2010 under the management of Afshin Ghotbi. In 2012 Haghighi was called up to the 2012 WAFF Championship in Kuwait. He started in a game against Bahrain. The game ended 0–0.

==== 2014 FIFA World Cup ====
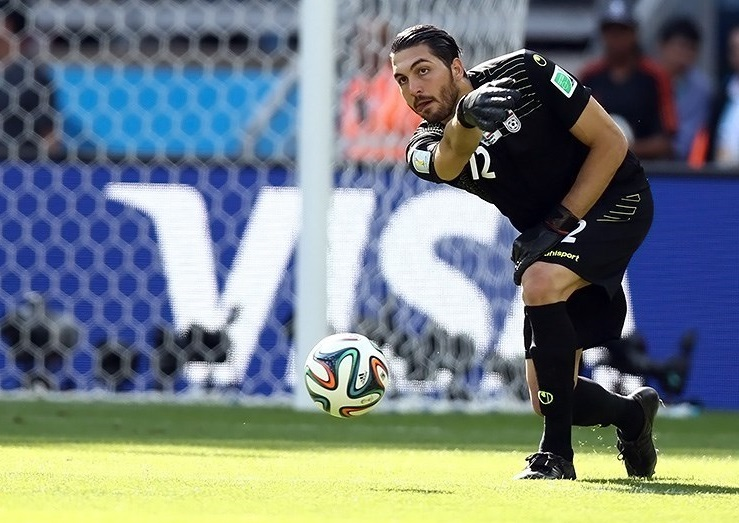
Haghighi starting match against the Argentina national football team

On 1 June 2014, he was included in Iran's 2014 FIFA World Cup squad by Carlos Queiroz. On 16 June 2014, Haghighi started in Iran's opening match in the World Cup against Nigeria. Haghighi became the first Iranian goalkeeper to achieve a clean sheet at a FIFA World Cup with a goalless draw. He also started Iran's next two matches in the World Cup against Argentina and Bosnia and Herzegovina. He showed a good performance in the Argentina match, where he saved shots from Lionel Messi, Gonzalo Higuaín and Sergio Agüero. He conceded the match's only goal in the 91st minute when Lionel Messi dribbled inside and curled a left-footed shot past the outstretched hands of Haghighi. In Iran's next and final tournament match, Haghighi conceded goals from Bosnia and Herzegovina strikers, where Iran was eliminated from the 2014 FIFA World Cup in the group stages after a 3–1 defeat.

==== 2015 AFC Asian Cup ====
He was called into Iran's 2015 AFC Asian Cup squad on 30 December 2014 by Carlos Queiroz. Haghighi was one of three goalkeepers that kept a clean sheet throughout the group stages of the 2015 AFC Asian Cup

== Club career statistics ==
As of 6 April 2018

Iran		Season	League		Hazfi Cup		Asia		Other		Total	
Club	Division	Season	Apps	Goals	Apps	Goals	Apps	Goals	Apps	Goals	Apps	Goals
Persepolis	Pro League	2006–07	4	0	0	0	–	–	0	0	4	0
Persepolis	Pro League	2007–08	0	0	0	0	–	–	0	0	0	0
Persepolis	Pro League	2008–09	20	0	1	0	3	0	0	0	24	0
Persepolis	Pro League	2009–10	15	0	4	0	–	–	0	0	19	0
Persepolis	Pro League	2010–11	20	0	6	0	3	0	0	0	29	0
Persepolis	Pro League	2011–12	14	0	3	0	0	0	0	0	17	0
Nassaji	Persian Gulf Pro League	2019–20	21	0	0	0	0	0	0	0	21	0
Gol Gohar	Persian Gulf Pro League	2020–21	18	0	2	0	0	0	0	0	20	0
Nassaji	Persian Gulf Pro League	2021–22	27	0	5	0	0	0	0	0	32	0
Nassaji	Persian Gulf Pro League	2022–23	30	0	4	0	0	0	1	0	35	0
Havadar	Persian Gulf Pro League	2023–24	20	0	1	0	0	0	0	0	21	0
Russia		Season	League		Russian Cup		Europe		Other			Total
Club	Division	Season	Apps	Goals	Apps	Goals	Apps	Goals	Apps	Goals	Apps	Goals
Rubin Kazan	Premier League	2011–12	1	0	0	0	0	0	0	0	1	0
Rubin Kazan	Premier League	2012–13	0	0	0	0	0	0	0	0	0	0
Iran		Season	League		Hazfi Cup		Asia		Other			Total
Club	Division	Season	Apps	Goals	Apps	Goals	Apps	Goals	Apps	Goals	Apps	Goals
Persepolis	Pro League	2013–14	0	0	2	0	–	–	0	0	2	0
Portugal		Season	League		Taça de Portugal		Europe		Other		Total	
Club	Division	Season	Apps	Goals	Apps	Goals	Apps	Goals	Apps	Goals	Apps	Goals
Covilhã	Segunda Liga	2013–14	12	0	0	0	–	–	0	0	12	0
Penafiel	Primeira Liga	2014–15	22	0	1	0	–	–	0	0	23	0
Marítimo	Primeira Liga	2015–16	4	0	1	0	0	0	0	0	5	0
Marítimo	Primeira Liga	2016–17	0	0	0	0	0	0	0	0	0	0
Russia		Season	League		Russian Cup		Europe		Other		Total	
Club	Division	Season	Apps	Goals	Apps	Goals	Apps	Goals	Apps	Goals	Apps	Goals
Rubin Kazan	Premier League	2015–16	0	0	1	0	0	0	0	0	1	0
Eskilstuna	Allsvenskan	2017	17	0	0	0	0	0	0	0	17	0
Sundsvall	Allsvenskan	2018	0	0	0	0	0	0	0	0	0	0
Total	Iran		179	0	16	0	6	0	1	0	202	0
Total	Russia		1	0	1	0	0	0	0	0	2	0
Total	Portugal		38	0	2	0	0	0	0	0	40	0
Total	Sweden		17	0	0	0	0	0	0	0	17	0
Career total			235	0	19	0	6	0	1	0	261	0

== Personal life ==
On 5 January 2026, Haghighi publicly supported the 2025–2026 Iranian protests on his Instagram, stating: "Protesting is not a crime! The crime is not to hear the people's voices! Iran is alive because its people are still standing."

== Honours ==
Persepolis

- Iran Pro League: 2007–08
- Hazfi Cup: 2009–10, 2010–11

Rubin Kazan

- Russian Cup: 2011–12
- Russian Super Cup: 2012
- Marbella Cup: 2012

Nassaji

- Hazfi Cup: 2021–22

Iran U23

- Asian Games Bronze Medal: 2006
