= Raphael Edereho =

Nigerian footballer (born 1983)

Personal information
- Full name: Raphael Edereho
- Date of birth: March 21, 1983 (age 43)
- Place of birth: Delta State, Nigeria
- Height: 1.82 m (5 ft 11 1/2 in)
- Position: Striker

Senior career*
Years	Team	Apps	(Gls)
2000–2001	Al Sarha	28	(19)
2001–2002	Ebiedafe	30	(15)
2002–2003	AS Racine	32	(17)
2004	FC Prishtina	15	(6)
2005	RoPS	7	(0)
2005	Tervarit	6	(5)
2005	KuPS	-	(-)
2005–2006	Persepolis	6	(1)
2007	Shakhter Kargandy	11	(6)
2007	AC Oulu	7	(4)
2008	VPS	24	(4)
2011	OPS	15	(3)
2012	FC Santa Claus	13	(5)
2012–2013	Najaf FC		
2013–2014	Duhok SC		
2014	Naft Maysan		
2014–2015	Masafi Al-Shamal		

International career
- Nigeria U-17
- * Club domestic league appearances and goals

Raphael Edereho (born March 21, 1983, in Delta State, Nigeria) is a retired Nigerian football player.

== Club career ==
Edereho started his career at the Saudi Arabian club Al Sarha FC in 2000. The following year, he moved back to his homeland, Nigeria, and played for Ebiedafe FC, and then transferred in 2002 to another Nigerian club, AS Racine FC. In 2004, Edereho made his first move to Europe and was transferred to KF Prishtina playing in the Football Superleague of Kosovo. The Finnish Veikkausliiga League was his next destination where he played for RoPS Rovaniemi, Tervarit Oulu and KuPS Kuopio where he impressed enough to transfer to Iranian giants Persepolis FC in 2006. In November 2006, it was also found out that KuPS Kuopio did not receive the transfer fee for Edereho from Persepolis. FIFA was investigating the situation and decided that Persepolis must pay the transfer fee. In 2011, he moved to OPS. In 2012–13 he played with Najaf FC, in 2013–14 with Duhok SC, in 2014 with Naft Maysan, and in 2014–15 with Masafi Al-Shamal, all in the Iraqi Premier League.

== International career ==
Edereho has represented Nigeria at U17 level.
