= Mohsen Ghahremani =

Iranian football referee

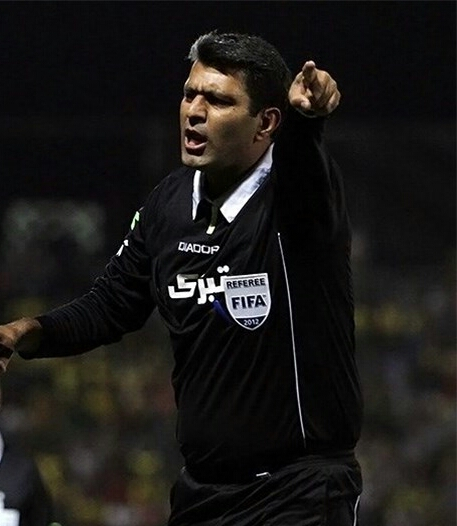
- Born: June 30, 1974 (age 52); Mashhad, Iran

Domestic
Years	League	Role
2001–2015	Iran Pro League	Referee

International
Years	League	Role
2003–2013	FIFA listed	Referee

Mohsen Ghahremani (Persian: محسن قهرمانی, born 30 June 1974 in Mashhad) is a retired Iranian football referee.

== Professional career ==
Mohsen Ghahremani started his career in 1989 when he was only 15 years old. He became a national referee in 1999 and entered the international list in 2003. Until 2013, he was one of the official referees of FIFA. In the same year, he became the fourth referee to officiate the Jordan-Palestine match of the Athens 2004 Olympic qualifiers. He then went to Turkmenistan and refereed the Kyrgyz-Turkmenistan match at the Asian Youth Tournament, and in 2005 became the referee of the Asian Elite. In the same year, in the 2005 AFC Champions League, he officiated Al-Wahda SC of Syria and Al-Zawraa SC of Iraq, and in the quarter-finals he officiated Al-Ittihad of Saudi Arabia and Shandong Luneng of China.

He also refereed the 2005 East Asian Football Championship final between South Korea and North Korea. He refereed in different Iranian leagues for 25 years.
