= Mostafa Mahdavikia =

Iranian footballer

Personal information
- Full name: Mostafa Mahdavikia
- Date of birth: 16 September 1984 (age 42)
- Place of birth: Tehran, Iran
- Positions: Attacking midfielder; striker

Team information
- Current team: Alvand Hamedan

Senior career*
Years	Team	Apps	(Gls)
2000–2005	Bank Melli		
2005–2006	Persepolis FC	1	(0)
2007–2009	Fajr Sepasi		
2009–2010	Sanati Kaveh		
2010–2011	Foolad Yazd		
2011–2012	Sanati Kaveh		
2012–2014	Alvand Hamedan		
- * Club domestic league appearances and goals as of 8 August 2011

Mostafa Mahdavikia (born 16 September 1984 in Tehran, Iran) is an Iranian football player and nephew of Mehdi Mahdavikia. He currently plays for Alvand Hamedan. He usually plays the attacking midfielder/striker position.

== Club career ==
Mostafa started his career at Bank Melli F.C. just like other members of the Mahdavikia family such as Mehdi Mahdavikia and Hadi Mahdavikia. Mostafa was then transferred to Iranian powerhouses Persepolis FC just like his Uncle Mehdi.

When Mehdi Mahdavikia was asked about Mostafa Mahdavikia he said:

He's a good football player and he has a lot of skill. He is also playing my position and Hadi's position in the Bank Melli team. But he has to go through that same stuff. So, all we can do is wait and see.

He signed for Fajr Sepasi on January 24, 2007.
