= Hossein Badamaki =

Iranian footballer (born 1981)

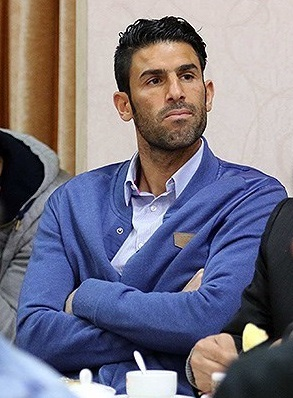

Personal information
- Full name: Gholam-Hossein Badamaki
- Date of birth: 13 September 1981 (age 45)
- Place of birth: Mashhad, Iran
- Height: 1.78 m (5 ft 10 in)
- Position: Attacking midfielder

Youth career
- 1998–1999: Dehdari Mashhad

Senior career*
Years	Team	Apps	(Gls)
1999–2006	Aboumoslem	128	(14)
2006–2012	Persepolis	148	(14)
2012–2013	Malavan	30	(0)
2013–2014	Padideh	5	(1)
2014	→ Saba Qom (loan)	13	(0)
2014–2015	Saba Qom	28	(3)
2015–2016	Padideh	27	(1)
2016–2018	Siah Jamegan	47	(4)

International career^{‡}
2006–2012	Iran	7	(2)
Medal record
Representing Iran
West Asian Football Federation Championship
Gold medal – first place	2007 Jordan	Team competition
- * Club domestic league appearances and goals as of 27 July 2017 ‡ National team caps and goals as of 6 August 2009^1 Apps and Caps only includes Iran Pro League onwards

Hossein Badamaki (Persian: حسین بادامكی, born 13 September 1981) is a retired Iranian Footballer who plays for Aboumoslem and Persepolis among other clubs in Persian Gulf Pro League.

== Club career ==
He was influential in the IPL 2005/06 season, scoring 10 goals for Aboomoslem. After playing for Aboomoslem for six years, in August 2006 he joined Iranian giants Persepolis.

The 2006/07 was his first season at Persepolis and despite the team not winning any trophies, Badamaki was one of the top players.

During the 2007/08 season Badamaki was still one of the starters but his problems with head coach Afshin Ghotbi made him miss some matches but at the end of the season he was put back in the starting line-up and helped Persepolis win the league after 6 years.

The 2008/09 season was indisputably Badamaki's worst season in his career. An injury made him miss over 8 games and when he returned head coach Afshin Ghotbi did not think Badamaki was fit to play. When Ghotbi resigned and Peyrovani took over, Badamaki was put in the starting eleven but he did not play as well and during matches fans started to boo him showing that Ghotbi was right and even when Nelo Vingada became the head coach, Badamaki was put in the reserves but he finally played in the AFC Champions League due to Persepolis missing players to injuries and disciplinary problems.

=== Club career statistics ===
- Last Update: 17 February 2018

Club performance			League		Cup		Continental		Total	
Season	Club	League	Apps	Goals	Apps	Goals	Apps	Goals	Apps	Goals
Iran			League		Hazfi Cup		Asia		Total	
2001–02	Aboomoslem	Pro League	19	1	0	0	–		19	1
2002–03	Aboomoslem	Pro League	18	2	0	0	–		18	2
2003–04	Aboomoslem	Pro League	22	1	0	0	–		22	1
2004–05	Aboomoslem	Pro League	29	2	0	0	–		29	2
2005–06	Aboomoslem	Pro League	28	10	0	0	–		28	10
2006–07	Persepolis	Pro League	28	5	4	0	–		32	5
2007–08	Persepolis	Pro League	29	3	3	1	–		32	4
2008–09	Persepolis	Pro League	14	1	0	0	1	0	15	1
2009–10	Persepolis	Pro League	25	0	6	0	–		31	0
2010–11	Persepolis	Pro League	23	4	6	0	6	1	35	5
2011–12	Persepolis	Pro League	31	1	3	0	5	1	39	2
2012–13	Malavan	Pro League	28	0	1	0	–		29	0
2013–14	Padideh	Division 1	5	1	0	0	–		5	1
2013–14	Saba Qom	Pro League	13	0	0	0	–		13	0
2014–15	Saba Qom	Pro League	28	3	0	0	–		28	3
2015–16	Padideh	Pro League	27	1	0	0	–		27	1
2016–17	Siah jamegan	Pro League	25	3	0	0	–		25	3
2017–18	Siah jamegan	Pro League	16	1	0	0	–		16	1
Career total			308	39	23	1	12	2	343	42

- Assist Goals

Season	Team	Assists
05–06	Aboomoslem	4
06–07	Persepolis	3
07–08	Persepolis	5
08–09	Persepolis	0
09–10	Persepolis	1
10–11	Persepolis	4
11–12	Persepolis	4
12–13	Malavan	3

== International career ==
In July 2006, he was one of the 40 players called up to the Iranian national team's preliminary squad for the 2007 Asian Cup.

On November 15, 2006, he made his debut for Iran against South Korea and scored in his debut. Badamaki was among Iran's squad winning the West Asian Football Federation Championship 2007.

He also was invited in June 2011 by Carlos Queiroz.

=== International goals ===
Scores and results list Iran's goal tally first.

#	Date	Venue	Opponent	Score	Result	Competition
1	15 November 2006	Azadi Stadium, Tehran	South Korea	2–0	2–0	2007 AFC Asian Cup qualification
2	24 June 2007	Amman International Stadium, Amman	Iraq	1–0	3–1	2007 WAFF

== Honours ==
=== Club ===
Aboomoslem

- Hazfi Cup:
  - Runner-up (1): 2004–05

Persepolis

- Iran Pro League (1): 2007–08
- Hazfi Cup (2): 2009–10, 2010–11
  - Runner-up (1): 2006 Hazfi Cup Final

== See also ==
List of Khorasani footballers
