= Alireza Vahedi Nikbakht =

Iranian footballer and coach (born 1980)

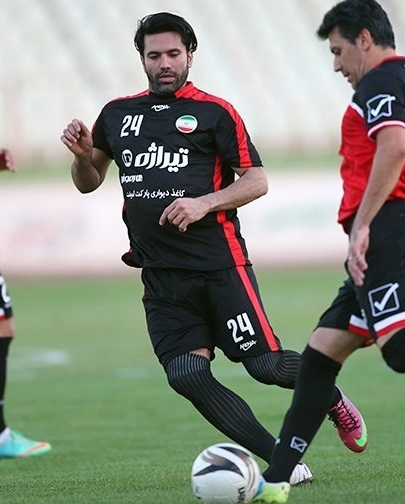
- Vahedi Nikbakht in 2015

Personal information
- Full name: Alireza Vahedi Nikbakht
- Date of birth: 30 June 1980 (age 46)
- Place of birth: Mashhad, Iran
- Height: 1.85 m (6 ft 1 in)
- Position: Winger

Youth career
- Aboomoslem

Senior career*
Years	Team	Apps	(Gls)
1998–1999	Aboomoslem	30	(6)
1999–2006	Esteghlal	138	(22)
2005	→ Al-Wasl (loan)	12	(1)
2006–2009	Persepolis	85	(26)
2009	Tractor Sazi	0	(0)
2009–2010	Steel Azin	8	(0)
2010–2011	Saba Qom	14	(1)
2011–2012	Paykan	22	(1)
2012	Gahar	0	(0)
2012–2013	Damash Gilan	4	(0)
2013–2014	Esteghlal	17	(0)
2014–2015	Khoneh Be Khoneh	1	(0)
Total		328	(58)

International career
2002	Iran U23	6	(5)
2000–2008	Iran	72	(14)

Managerial career
- 2019–2020: Sorkhpooshan Pakdasht (assistant)
- 2020: Gol Reyhan Alborz (assistant)
- 2020–2021: Chooka Talesh (assistant)
- 2023: Shadkam Mashhad
- 2023–2024: Shohadaye Razakan Karaj
- 2024: Shadkam Mashhad
Medal record
Representing Iran
Asian Games
Gold medal – first place	2002 Busan	Team
- * Club domestic league appearances and goals

Alireza Vahedi Nikbakht (Persian: علیرضا واحدی نیکبخت; born 30 June 1980) is an Iranian football coach and former player.

He has played for Aboomoslem, Esteghlal, Al-Wasl, Persepolis, Steel Azin, Saba Qom, Paykan, Damash Gilan, Khoneh Be Khoneh, and the Iran national team, for which he scored 14 goals.

== Club career ==
In 2006, Vahedi Nikbakht joined Persepolis. In his second season, Persepolis won the league and he had the best season of his career with nine goals and seven assists. In January 2008, Vahedi Nikbakht was invited to go on a trial with Sheffield United.

For the second half of the 2009–10 season, he joined Steel Azin.

He terminated his contract with Gahar Zagros and joins Damash Gilan.

On 1 July 2013, Vahedi Nikbakht returned to Esteghlal after seven years, signing a one-year contract.

== Career statistics ==
=== Club ===
Appearances and goals by club, season and competition
Club	Season	League			National Cup (Note: Includes Hazfi Cup, UAE President's Cup)		Continental (Note: Includes AFC Champions League)		Total	
Club	Season	Division	Apps	Goals	Apps	Goals	Apps	Goals	Apps	Goals
Aboomoslem	1998–99	Azadegan League	30	6			—		30+	6+
Esteghlal	1999–00	Azadegan League	26	3		1		1	26+	5
Esteghlal	2000–01	Azadegan League	18	5		1		3	18+	9
Esteghlal	2001–02	Iran Pro League	19	3		0	7	6	26+	9
Esteghlal	2002–03	Iran Pro League	21	6		1	3	0	24+	7
Esteghlal	2003–04	Iran Pro League	16	3		1	—		16+	4
Esteghlal	2004–05	Iran Pro League	13	2	0	0	—		13+	2
Esteghlal	2005–06	Iran Pro League	25	1	1	1	—		26	2
Esteghlal	Total		138	23	1+	5+	10+	10	149+	38
Al-Wasl (loan)	2004–05	UAE Football League	12	1	1	0	—		13	1
Persepolis	2006–07	Persian Gulf Cup	25	8	5	4	—		30	12
Persepolis	2007–08	Persian Gulf Cup	31	9	3	3	—		34	12
Persepolis	2008–09	Persian Gulf Cup	29	9	2	0	6	2	37	11
Persepolis	Total		85	26	10	7	6	2	101	35
Tractor Sazi	2009–10	Persian Gulf Cup	0	0	0	0	—		0	0
Steel Azin	2009–10	Persian Gulf Cup	8	0	2	0	—		10	0
Saba	2010–11	Persian Gulf Cup	14	1	1	1	—		15	2
Paykan	2011–12	Azadegan League	22	1	2	0	—		24	1
Damash	2012–13	Persian Gulf Cup	4	0	1	0	—		5	0
Esteghlal	2013–14	Persian Gulf Cup	14	0	2	0	2	0	18	0
Khoneh Be Khoneh	2014–15	League 2	1	0	0	0	—		1	0
Career total			328	58	20+	13+	18+	12	366+	83+

=== International ===
Scores and results list Iran's goal tally first.

No.	Date	Venue	Opponent	Score	Result	Competition
1	24 November 2000	Takhti Stadium, Tabriz, Iran	Guam	4–0	19–0	2002 FIFA World Cup qualification
2	19 January 2001	Azadi Stadium, Tehran, Iran	China	3–0	4–0	Friendly
3	1 August 2001	Khalifa International Stadium, Doha, Qatar	Qatar	1–1	1–2	Friendly
4	15 August 2001	Tehelné pole, Bratislava, Slovakia	Slovakia	3–3	4–3	Friendly
5	5 October 2001	Azadi Stadium, Tehran, Iran	Thailand	1–0	1–0	2002 FIFA World Cup qualification
6	3 September 2002	Abbasiyyin Stadium, Damascus, Syria	Lebanon	2–0	2–0	2002 WAFF Championship
7	7 September 2002	Al Abbassiyyine Stadium, Damascus, Syria	Syria	2–1	2–2	2002 WAFF Championship
8	5 September 2003	Azadi Stadium, Tehran, Iran	Jordan	2–1	4–1	2004 AFC Asian Cup qualification
9	19 November 2003	Camille Chamoun Sports City Stadium, Beirut, Lebanon	Lebanon	3–0	3–0	2004 AFC Asian Cup qualification
10	21 June 2004	Azadi Stadium, Tehran, Iran	Syria	2–0	7–1	2004 WAFF Championship
11	8 September 2004	Amman International Stadium, Amman, Jordan	Jordan	1–0	2–0	2006 FIFA World Cup qualification
12	18 February 2004	Azadi Stadium, Tehran, Iran	Qatar	1–0	3–1	2006 FIFA World Cup qualification
13	24 March 2007	Khalifa International Stadium, Doha, Qatar	Qatar	1–0	1–0	Friendly
14	26 March 2008	Kuwait National Stadium, Kuwait City, Kuwait	Kuwait	1–0	2–2	2010 FIFA World Cup qualification

== Honours ==
Esteghlal

- Iran Pro League: 2000–01, 2005–06; runner-up: 2001–02, 2003–04
- Hazfi Cup: 1999–00, 2001–02; runner-up: 1998–99, 2003–04

Persepolis

- Persian Gulf Cup: 2007–08
- Hazfi Cup runner-up: 2006

Paykan

- Azadegan League: 2011–12

Iran

- Asian Games: 2002
- WAFF Championship: 2004
- AFC–OFC Challenge Cup: 2003
