= Ehsan Khorsandi =

Iranian footballer

Personal information
- Full name: Ehsan Khorsandi Pishkenari
- Date of birth: March 24, 1985 (age 41)
- Place of birth: Tehran, Iran
- Height: 1.81 m (5 ft 11 1/2 in)
- Positions: Second striker; centre forward

Youth career
- 1998–2006: Persepolis

Senior career*
Years	Team	Apps	(Gls)
2001–2008	Persepolis	27	(5)
2008–2009	Aboumoslem	19	(0)
2009–2011	Gahar Zagros	29	(0)
2011–2012	Gostaresh	15	(0)
2012–2013	Parseh	25	(4)

International career
2006–2007	Iran U23	3	(0)
Medal record
Representing Iran
Men's Football
Asian Games
Bronze medal – third place	2006 Qatar	Team competition
- * Club domestic league appearances and goals

Ehsan Khorsandi Pishkenari (Persian: احسان خرسندی; born March 24, 1985) is an Iranian football player who plays in the striker position. He is currently a member of the club Gohar Zagros.

== Club career ==
Khorsandi made his debut for Persepolis on May 19, 2002, 24th week of 01/02 in the match against Esteghlal Rasht, after serving many years as a Persepolis youth clubs player. He came back to Persepolis youth squads until 05/06 season, when he played for both youth and first squads teams. at the end of 07/08 season, when Persepolis gained its 2nd title in Iran Pro League, he was hesitant of staying or leaving the club, after he was not given no chance to play. at the end he decided to move to Aboumoslem despite he claimed that he had offer from Esteghlal. Khorsandi and Farshid Karimi, are the only players that could win IPL with Persepolis twice.

=== Club career statistics ===
As of 29 September 2010

Club performance			League		Cup		Continental		Total	
Season	Club	League	Apps	Goals	Apps	Goals	Apps	Goals	Apps	Goals
Iran			League		Hazfi Cup		Asia		Total	
2001–02	Persepolis	Pro League	1	0	0	0	-	-	1	0
2002–03	Persepolis	Pro League	–							
2003–04	Persepolis	Pro League	–							
2004–05	Persepolis	Pro League	–							
2005–06	Persepolis	Pro League	1	0	1	0	-	-	2	0
2006–07	Persepolis	Pro League	13	4	3	3	-	-	16	7
2007–08	Persepolis	Pro League	12	1	0	0	-	-	12	1
2008–09	Aboumoslem	Pro League	19	0	1	0	-	-	20	0
2009–10	Damash Lorestan	Division 1	16	0			-	-		
2010–11	Damash Lorestan	Division 1	13	0			-	-		
2011–12	Gostaresh	Division 1					-	-		
Career total										

- Assist Goals

Season	Team	Assists
07-08	Persepolis	1
08-09	Aboumoslem	1

== International career ==
He was a member of Iran U23 and Iran U20.

== Activism ==
He was arrested during 2009 Ashura protests.

== Honours ==
- Persian Gulf Pro League Winner: 2
  - 2001–02 with Persepolis
  - 2007–08 with Persepolis
- 2006 Asian Games Bronze Medalist
