= Robert Caha =

Czech footballer

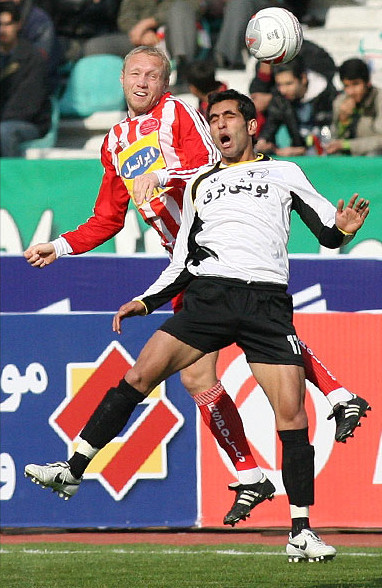

Personal information
- Full name: Robert Caha
- Date of birth: 11 March 1976 (age 50)
- Place of birth: Jihlava, Czechoslovakia
- Height: 1.82 m (5 ft 11 1/2 in)
- Position: Defender

Senior career*
Years	Team	Apps	(Gls)
1993–1994	Spartak PSJ Jihlava		
1994–1995	Baník Ostrava	0	(0)
1995–1996	Chrudim 1887	4	(0)
1996	VTJ Znojmo		
1996–1997	Brümmer Česká Lípa	11	(3)
1997	NH Ostrava		
1997–1998	LeRK Prostějov	27	(4)
1998–2001	Baník Ostrava	46	(1)
2001	Shenyang Ginde		
2002	Baník Ostrava	0	(0)
2002–2004	Sigma Olomouc	51	(0)
2004–2005	CSKA Sofia	8	(0)
2005–2007	Persepolis	31	(0)
2007	Shahin Bushehr		
2008–2009	DAC Dunajská Streda	11	(0)
2009–2010	Vysočina Jihlava	15	(1)
2011	Odra Wodzisław	15	(3)
2011–2012	Slavoj TKZ Polná		
- * Club domestic league appearances and goals

Robert Caha (born 11 March 1976) is a Czech former professional footballer who played as a defender.

== Club career ==
Caha started his career at Czech club Baník Ostrava. In 2001, he moved to Chinese Super League team Shenyang Ginde. After one season at Shenyang Ginde, Caha moved back to Baník Ostrava and in 2003 signed for SK Sigma Olomouc.

After impressing at Sigma Olomouc, he was transferred to Bulgarian champions CSKA Sofia.

After a somewhat disappointing stay at CSKA, Caha left the club in the summer of 2005. Soon afterwards, he caught the eye of Iranian giants Persepolis and signed an 18-month contract with the club.

In February 2011, he moved to Odra Wodzisław.
