= Mohammad Reza Mamani =

Iranian footballer

Personal information
- Full name: Mohammad Reza Mamani
- Date of birth: June 9, 1982 (age 44)
- Place of birth: Tehran, Iran
- Height: 1.85 m (6 ft 1 in)
- Position: Midfielder

Youth career
- 1999–2005: Persepolis

Senior career*
Years	Team	Apps	(Gls)
2005–2008	Persepolis	39	(0)
2008–2009	Pas Hamedan	18	(0)
2011–2012	Shahrdari Yasuj	12	(1)
2012–2013	Rah Ahan	2	(0)
- * Club domestic league appearances and goals as of July 31, 2012

Mohammad Reza Mamani (Persian: محمدرضا مامانی, born June 9, 1982) is a former Iranian footballer who played for Persepolis, Pas Hamedan, Shahrdari Yasuj and Rah Ahan during his football career.

== Honours ==
- Iran's Premier Football League Winner: 1
  - 2007/08 with Persepolis
