= Hamid Shafiei =

Iranian footballer

Personal information
- Full name: Hamid Shafiei
- Date of birth: July 8, 1981 (age 45)
- Place of birth: Isfahan،Nikabad, Iran
- Height: 1.86 m (6 ft 1 in)
- Position: Forward

Senior career*
Years	Team	Apps	(Gls)
2004–2006	Zob Ahan F.C.	20	(3)
2006–2007	Sepahan S.C.	10	(4)
2007–2008	Esteghlal F.C.	8	(1)
2008–2009	F.C. Aboomoslem	6	(0)

International career^{‡}
2003	Iran U23		
2003–2006	Iran	3	(0)
- * Club domestic league appearances and goals as of October 6, 2009 ‡ National team caps and goals as of May 2009

Hamid Shafiei (Persian: حمید شفیعی, born July 8, 1981, in Isfahan, Iran) is an Iranian retired football player, who currently plays for IPL team Esteghlal.

== Club career ==
After playing for Zob Ahan F.C. for a couple of seasons, in August 2006 he was transferred to Sepahan F.C. He has scored some vital goals for Sepahan, including the one in the final of Hazfi Cup in September 2006.

On August 7, 2007, Shafiei signed a contract with another IPL club, Esteghlal F.C. Where he was most of the time injured and left the club one season after to Aboosmolem and had another disaster season with the injuries and missed so many matches.

Season	Team	Country	Division	Apps	Goals	Assists
04/05	Zob Ahan	Iran	1	14	2	?
05/06	Zob Ahan	Iran	1	6	1	1
06/07	Sepahan	Iran	1	10	4	1
07/08	Esteghlal	Iran	1	8	1	1
08/09	Aboomoslem	Iran	1	6	0	0
09/10	Aboomoslem	Iran	1	0	0	0

== International career ==
He was called to the Iran U-23 team for the 2004 Athens Olympics qualifications. Despite the talent on the team, the Iran U-23 team did not qualify for the 2004 Summer Olympics.

In October 2006 he was called up to the Team Melli for an LG Cup tournament held in Jordan.

== Honours ==
Sepahan:

- Hazfi Cup Winner: 1
  - 2006

Esteghlal:

- Hazfi Cup Winner: 1
  - 2008
