= Masoud Zarei =

Iranian footballer

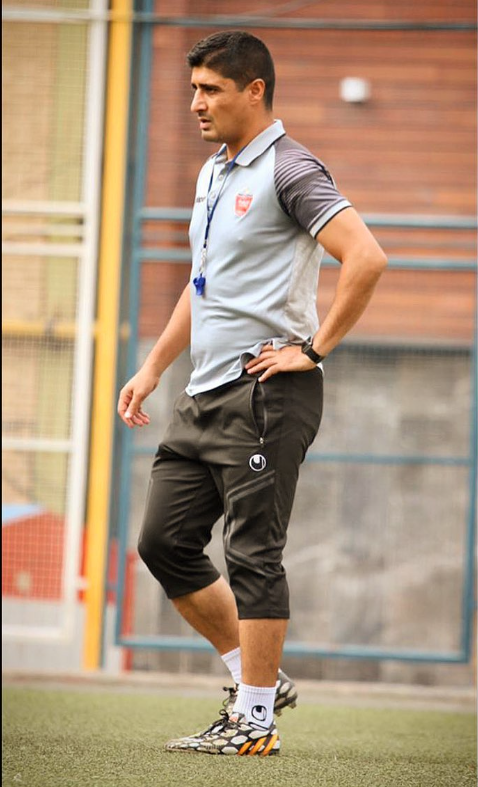

Personal information
- Full name: Masoud Zarei
- Date of birth: August 25, 1981 (age 45)
- Place of birth: Tehran, Iran
- Position: Defender

Team information
- Current team: Damash Gilan
- Number: 5

Senior career*
Years	Team	Apps	(Gls)
2004–2006	Saba Battery	23	(2)
2006–2009	Persepolis	32	(0)
2009–2011	Mes Kerman	17	(0)
2011–2012	Paykan		
2012–2013	Damash Gilan	1	(0)
- * Club domestic league appearances and goals as of 16 December 2009

Masoud Zarei (Persian: مسعود زارعی, born August 25, 1981, in Tehran, Iran) is an Iranian footballer, currently a member of the IPL club Mes Kerman.

== Club career ==
=== Club career Statistics ===
Last Update 16 December 2009

Club performance			League		Cup		Continental		Total	
Season	Club	League	Apps	Goals	Apps	Goals	Apps	Goals	Apps	Goals
Iran			League		Hazfi Cup		Asia		Total	
2004–05	Saba	Persian Gulf Cup	16	0			-	-		
2005–06	Saba	Persian Gulf Cup	7	1				0		
2006–07	Persepolis	Persian Gulf Cup	14	0	0	0	-	-	14	0
2007–08	Persepolis	Persian Gulf Cup	8	0	0	0	-	-	8	0
2008–09	Persepolis	Persian Gulf Cup	10	0	0	0	0	0	10	0
2009–10	Mes	Persian Gulf Cup	17	0			0	0		
Total	Iran		72	2				0		
Career total			72	2				0		

- Assist Goals

Season	Team	Assists
06–07	Persepolis	1
07–08	Persepolis	3
09–10	Mes	0

== Honours ==
- Azadegan League
  - Winner: 1
    - 2003/04 with Saba Battery
- Hazfi Cup
  - Winner: 1
    - 2005 with Saba Battery
- Iran's Premier Football League
  - Winner: 1
    - 2007/08 with Persepolis
