= Davoud Seyed-Abbasi =

Iranian footballer

Davoud Seyed Abbasi
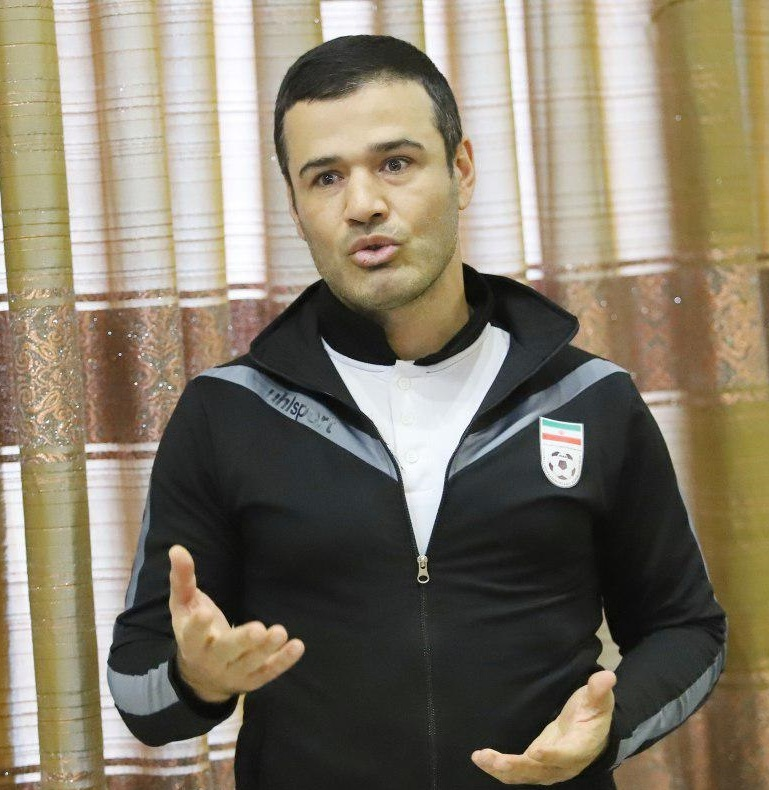

Personal information
- Full name: Seyed Davoud Seyed Abbasi
- Date of birth: 1 February 1980 (age 46)
- Place of birth: Tehran, Iran
- Height: 1.72 m (5 ft 7 1/2 in)
- Position: Midfielder

Youth career
- Fajr Sepah Tehran

Senior career*
| Years | Team | Apps | (Gls) |
| 2000–2001 | Fajr Sepasi | 18 | (4) |
| 2001–2002 | Esteghlal | 20 | (1) |
| 2002–2003 | Sanat Naft Abadan F.C. | 23 | (6) |
| 2003–2004 | Esteghlal | 22 | (2) |
| 2004–2005 | Sepahan | 16 | (1) |
| 2005–2007 | Persepolis | 30 | (0) |
| 2007–2008 | Steel Azin | 8 | (0) |
| 2008–2010 | Aboomoslem | 29 | (1) |
| 2010–2011 | Aluminium Hormozgan | 17 | (4) |
| 2011–2012 | Paykan | 9 | (0) |
| 2012–2014 | Parseh | 20 | (1) |

International career^{‡}
| 2000–2004 | Iran | 13 | (0) |

Managerial career
- 2015–2017: Parseh
- 2021–2022: Shahr Khodro
- * Club domestic league appearances and goals as of 12 October 2014 ‡ National team caps and goals as of 20 August 2006

Seyed Davoud Seyed Abbasi (Persian: داود سید عباسی, born 1 February 1980 in Tehran, Iran) is a retired Iranian football player who last played in the midfield position. He was a member of the Azadegan League club, Parseh.

== Club career ==
Abbasi started his career at Fajr Sepah, before joining Shirazi club F.C. Fajr Sepasi. He displayed great form there and was called up to the Olympic team and eventually national team because of it. With more impressive performances he was noticed by the bigger clubs in Iran and was signed by the powerhouse Esteghlal F.C. The competition for him was too much and he moved to Sanat Naft Abadan F.C. for the 2002–03 season. He was one of few non-Abadani players who was supported by the passionate Naft fans, but left after one season, returning to Esteghlal F.C. His stay there was once again very short and he left Esteghlal for Sepahan F.C. He was eventually able to regain his old form and was called up again to the national team during the same time. Esteghlal's fierce rival, Persepolis F.C. signed him in 2005. He is currently playing for the club, despite rumors at one point, stating that former Persepolis manager, Arie Haan, wanted him out. He stayed for another season but was mostly benched so he moved to Steel Azin and played in the first division. He stayed there for one season and then moved to Aboomoslem where he had another average season.

=== Club career statistics ===
As of 3 June 2010

| Club performance | | | League | | Cup | | Continental | | Total | |
| Season | Club | League | Apps | Goals | Apps | Goals | Apps | Goals | Apps | Goals |
| Iran | | | League | | Hazfi Cup | | Asia | | Total | |
|---|---|---|---|---|---|---|---|---|---|---|
| 2001–02 | Esteghlal | Pro League | 20 | 1 | | | | | | |
| 2002–03 | Sanat Naft Abadan F.C. | Pro League | | 6 | | | - | - | | |
| 2003–04 | Esteghlal | Pro League | 25 | 2 | | | - | - | | |
| 2004–05 | Sepahan | Pro League | 16 | 1 | | | | 0 | | |
| 2005–06 | Persepolis | Pro League | 18 | 0 | | | - | - | | |
| 2006–07 | Persepolis | Pro League | 12 | 0 | | | - | - | | |
| 2007–08 | Steel Azin | Azadegan League | | 0 | | | - | - | | |
| 2008–09 | Aboomoslem | Pro League | 16 | 0 | | | - | - | | |
| 2009–10 | Aboomoslem | Pro League | 13 | 1 | | | - | - | | |
| 2010–11 | Aluminium H | Azadegan League | 17 | 4 | 1 | 0 | - | - | 10 | 1 |
| Total | Iran | | | 11 | | | | | | |
| Career total | | | | 11 | | | | | | |

- Assist Goals

| Season | Team | Assists |
|---|---|---|
| 09–10 | Aboomoslem | 2 |

== International career ==
Seyed Abbasi's international career has been limited to appearances for the Olympic team and brief appearances as a substitute on the senior national team. His first cap was on 2 June 2002 versus Syria. He had 13 caps and no goals for Team Melli.

== Honours ==
Fajr Sepasi

- Hazfi Cup (1): 2000–01

Esteghlal

- Hazfi Cup (1): 2001–02
