= Mohsen Torky =

Iranian former football referee

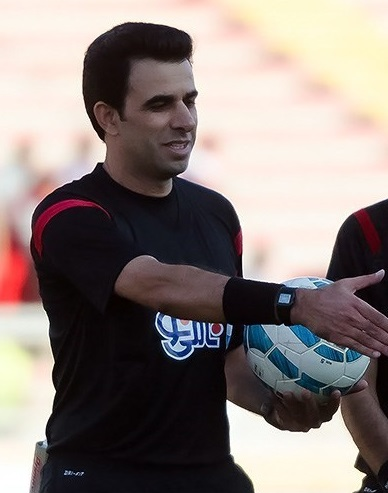
- Full name: Mohsen Torky
- Born: July 11, 1973 (age 53); Boshruyeh, South Khorasan, Iran

Domestic
Years	League	Role
2000–2017	Persian Gulf Pro League	Referee

International
Years	League	Role
2003–2017	FIFA listed	Referee

Mohsen Torky (Persian: محسن ترکی) is an Iranian former football referee who had been refereeing in Iran's Pro League for seasons and has been on the international list from 2003 to 2013. He was the first Iranian referee to officiate the Tehran derby after 14 years.

== Referee career ==
Mohsen Torky started to officiate in the top league in Iran in 2000 and after just three years he became a FIFA listed referee. In 2007 Torky became an AFC Elite referee which meant that now he will regularly referee games in the AFC Champions League. In 2006, he refereed his first game in the Champions league between Al-Arabi and Al Quwa Al Jawiya and in 2007 he officiated an AFC Cup semi final.

During the 2008/09 season Torky officiated 4 games in the 2010 FIFA world cup qualifications. He also officiated four games in the group stage of the 2009 AFC Champions League but the biggest test of Torky's career came in the 66th Tehran derby when he became the first Iranian referee to officiate the game in 14 years. He did such a great job that he officiated the Tehran derby again in the 2009/10 season. Torky was also officiate in the 2011 AFC Asian Cup. He announced his retirement in February 2013 but it was later denied.

== AFC Champions League ==
=== 2007 ===
Match Day	Home	Score	Away
5	Al-Zawraa (Iraq)	3 - 2	(Kuwait) Al-Arabi

=== 2008 ===
Match Day	Home	Score	Away
1	Pohang Steelers (South Korea)	0 - 2	(Australia) Adelaide United
3	Kashima Antlers (Japan)	1 - 0	(China) Beijing Guoan

=== 2009 ===
Match Day	Home	Score	Away Shandong_Luneng
1	Kawasaki Frontale (Japan)	1 - 0	(China) Tianjin Teda
3	Shandong Luneng (China)	2 - 0	(South Korea) Seoul
4	Suwon Bluewings (South Korea)	2 - 1	(China) Shanghai Shenhua
6	Beijing Guoan (China)	1 - 1	(Japan) Nagoya Grampus

=== 2011 ===
Match Day	Home	Score	Away
1	Al-Sadd (Qatar)	5 - 1	(Syria) Al-Ittihad

== AFC Cup ==
=== 2007 ===
Match Day	Home	Score	Away
1	Osotspa Saraburi F.C. (Thailand)	4 - 0	(Malaysia) Pahang FA
4	Al-Muharraq (Bahrain)	1 - 1	(Yemen) Al-Hilal
SF	Al-Nejmeh (Lebanon)	0 - 0	(Jordan) Shabab Al-Ordun

=== 2009 ===
Match Day	Home	Score	Away
Round of 16	Al-Arabi (Kuwait)	2 - 1	(Lebanon) Safa
QF-SL	Arbil (Iraq)	0 - 1	Al-Kuwait
