= Mehrzad Madanchi =

Iranian former footballer

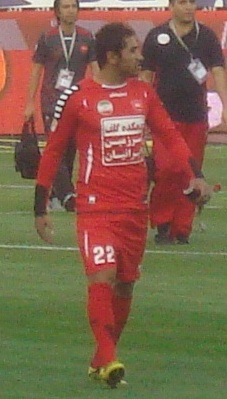
- Madanchi with Persepolis in 2013

Personal information
- Full name: Mehrzad Madanchi Ardakani
- Date of birth: 12 October 1983 (age 43)
- Place of birth: Shiraz,Iran
- Height: 1.80 m (5 ft 11 in)
- Position: Left winger

Team information
- Current team: Fajr Sepasi (assistant coach)

Youth career
- Vali Asr Shiraz Academy
- Homa Shiraz

Senior career*
Years	Team	Apps	(Gls)
2002–2005	Fajr Sepasi	69	(10)
2005–2007	Persepolis	55	(11)
2007–2008	Al Shaab	21	(15)
2008–2009	Al Nasr	18	(9)
2009–2010	Al Ahli	15	(1)
2010–2011	Steel Azin	21	(0)
2011–2012	Al Shaab	16	(0)
2012–2013	Persepolis	5	(0)
2013–2014	Fajr Sepasi	14	(0)
Total		234	(46)

International career^{‡}
2000–2001	Iran U–20	13	(?)
2003–2004	Iran U–23	6	(?)
2003–2010	Iran	42	(8)
- * Club domestic league appearances and goals as of 10 May 2013 ‡ National team caps and goals as of 9 October 2026

Mehrzad Madanchi Ardekani (Persian: مهرزاد معدنچى; born 12 October 1983) is an Iranian former football midfielder who last played for Fajr Sepasi.

== Club career ==
The attacker started his playing career in Homa Shiraz club which plays in the lower Iranian divisions. After playing impressively at the lower division Shiraz club, he earned a transfer to Fajr Sepasi, one of the top two clubs of Shiraz (the other being Bargh Shiraz). He was immediately seen as a big talent and continued to play well in the 2004/2005 season. The speedy left winger saw his performances be rewarded with a transfer to the most popular club in Iran, Persepolis, in July 2005.

In the 2005/2006 season at Persepolis Madanchi grew to become a first team player. He played some good matches on the left wing during the season, due to his great speed and dribbling. His main problem however was his crossing ability, which many agreed could be greatly improved. At the end of the season Persepolis coach Arie Haan took Madanchi away from the left wing and put him in as a striker, with topscorer Javad Kazemian as his partner. This position worked immediately, as in three matches in the Hazfi Cup Madanchi scored seven goals, a hattrick against Abu Muslem and two doubles against Malavan and Nozhan.

In the 2006/2007 season at Persepolis Madanchi was put in the striker position by head coach Mustafa Denizli. This really helped out Persepolis because Madanchi was able to score 10 goals and make 5 assists in the League and was announced the best player of the 2006/2007 IPL season called the Persian Gulf Cup. On 10 July 2007 Madanchi signed a one-year deal with U.A.E's club Al-Shaab for a fee of $500,000.

During the 2007/2008 season at Al-Shaab, Madanchi played in the Striker position for the entire season which resulted in him scoring 17 goals in three different competitions. He scored 14 goals in the UAE League, while scoring two goals in the Arab Champions League and one goal in the UAE Cup. Although, 8 of his 17 goals were scored from the penalty spot. After the season Madanchi was named the Foreign Player of the Season 2007/08 of the UAE League.

On 31 May 2008 Madanchi signed a one-year deal with Al-Nasr Sports Club in the UAE League in a contract is thought to be worth over $1.5 million. He moved to Al-Ahli in summer 2009 where he played in 2009 FIFA Club World Cup and also AFC Champions League.

He joined Steel Azin in 2010 and stayed there for a season where he had an unsuccessful season because of the injuries he had and after the relegation of the team he moved to Al Shaab but again because of the injuries he had his contract was canceled halfway through the season.

On 16 July 2012 he joined Persepolis with a three-year contract. After spending one season at the club and not gaining much of playing time, his contract was terminated and he joined Fajr Sepasi.

=== Club career statistics ===
As of 10 May 2013

Club performance			League		Cup		Continental		Total	
Season	Club	League	Apps	Goals	Apps	Goals	Apps	Goals	Apps	Goals
Iran			League		Hazfi Cup		Asia		Total	
2002–03	Fajr	Pro League	23	2			–			
2003–04	Fajr	Pro League	22	5			–			
2004–05	Fajr	Pro League	24	3			–			
2005–06	Persepolis	Pro League	28	1	6	7	–		34	8
2006–07	Persepolis	Pro League	27	10	4	2	–		31	12
United Arab Emirates			League		President's Cup		Asia		Total	
2007–08	Al Shaab	UAE League	21	15			–			
2008–09	Al Nasr	UAE League	18	9			–			
2009–10	Al Ahli	UAE League	15	1	4	1	6	1	25	3
Iran			League		Hazfi Cup		Asia		Total	
2010–11	Steel Azin	Pro league	21	0	1	0	–		22	0
United Arab Emirates			League		President's Cup		Asia		Total	
2011–12	Al Shaab	Division 1	6	0	0	0	–		6	0
Iran			League		Hazfi Cup		Asia		Total	
2012–13	Persepolis	Pro league	5	0	1	0	–		6	0
Total	Iran		150	21			0	0		
Total	United Arab Emirates		60	25			6	1		
Career total			210	46			6	1		

- Assist Goals

Season	Team	Assists
05–06	Persepolis	5
06–07	Persepolis	5
10–11	Steel Azin	2
12–13	Persepolis	0

== International career ==
Madanchi was selected for the Iranian Olympic team during the qualifiers for the Olympic Games 2004. Although Iran failed to qualify for the tournament, Madanchi, at the time only 18, was one of the stars of the young team. His good performance during the qualifiers led to him being called up to the full national team and he made his debut in August 2003 against Belarus. His most impressive international match was Iran's Asian Cup qualifier against Chinese Taipei in March 2006, in which he scored two of Iran's four goals. He also scored one goal against Bosnia in a World Cup warmup friendly.

He was selected for Iran's final World Cup 2006 squad as one of the 23 players. In July 2007 and for the Asian Championships Madanchi was called for Team Melli once again. He has been called up for Team Melli for the 2010 FIFA World Cup Qualifying. He also featured and scored in 2011 AFC Asian Cup qualification.

=== International goals ===
Scores and results list Iran's goal tally first.

#	Date	Venue	Opponent	Score	Result	Competition
1	22 February 2006	Azadi Stadium, Tehran	Chinese Taipei	2–0	4–0	ACQ 2007
2	22 February 2006	Azadi Stadium, Tehran	Chinese Taipei	3–0	4–0	ACQ 2007
3	31 May 2006	Azadi Stadium, Tehran	Bosnia and Herzegovina	1–2	5–2	Friendly
4	2 July 2007	Azadi Stadium, Tehran	Jamaica	2–0	8–1	Friendly
5	2 July 2007	Azadi Stadium, Tehran	Jamaica	5–0	8–1	Friendly
6	1 April 2009	Azadi Stadium, Tehran	Senegal	1–1	1–1	Friendly
7	2 January 2010	Qatar SC Stadium, Doha	North Korea	1–0	1–0	2010 Qatar Friendship Cup
8	6 January 2010	National Stadium, Kallang	Singapore	2–0	3–1	ACQ 2011

=== International Matches ===
1. Belarus, 20 August 2003, friendly match
2. Panama, 18 December 2004, friendly match
3. Chinese Taipei, 22 February 2006, 2007 Asian Cup qualifiers
4. Costa Rica, 1 March 2006, friendly match
5. Croatia, 28 May 2006, friendly match
6. Bosnia, 31 May 2006, friendly match
7. Mexico, 11 June 2006, 2006 Fifa World Cup
8. Portugal, 17 June 2006, 2006 Fifa World Cup
9. Angola, 21 June 2006, 2006 Fifa World Cup
10. United Arab Emirates, 8 August 2006, friendly match
11. Syria, 16 August 2006, 2007 Asian Cup qualifiers
12. South Korea, 2 September 2006, 2007 Asian Cup qualifiers
13. Syria, 6 September 2006, 2007 Asian Cup qualifiers
14. Iraq, 4 October 2006, friendly match
15. Qatar, 24 March 2007, friendly match
16. Ghana, 28 June 2007, friendly match
17. Jamaica, 2 July 2007, friendly match
18. Uzbekistan, 11 July 2007, Asian Cup
19. China, 15 July 2007, Asian Cup
20. Korea Republic, 22 July 2007, Asian Cup
21. Qatar, 10 January 2008, friendly match
22. Costa Rica, 30 January 2008, friendly match
23. Syria, 6 February 2008, World Cup Qualifiers
24. Bahrain, 22 March 2008, friendly match
25. Kuwait, 26 March 2008, World Cup Qualifiers
26. Azerbaijan, 27 August 2008, friendly match
27. Saudi Arabia, 6 September 2008, World Cup Qualifiers
28. United Arab Emirates, 19 November 2008, World Cup Qualifiers
29. Saudi Arabia, 28 March 2009, World Cup Qualifiers
30. Senegal, 1 April 2009, friendly match
31. China, 1 June 2009, friendly match
32. Korea DPR, 6 June 2009, World Cup Qualifiers
33. Bosnia, 12 August 2009, friendly match

=== International appearances and goals ===
World Cup 3 (0)
World Cup qualification 6 (0)
Asian Cup 3 (0)
Asian Cup qualification 4 (2)
Friendly 17 (4)

== Honours ==
=== Club ===
- Hazfi Cup:
  - Runner up:
    - 2002–03 with Fajr Sepasi
    - 2005–06 with Persepolis
    - 2012–13 with Persepolis

=== International ===
- AFC/OFC Cup Challenge:
  - Winner:
    - 2003 with Iran

=== Individual ===
- UAE League:
  - Foreigner Player of the year:
    - 2007–08 with Al-Shaab
