= Masoud Moradi =

Iranian football referee (born 1965)

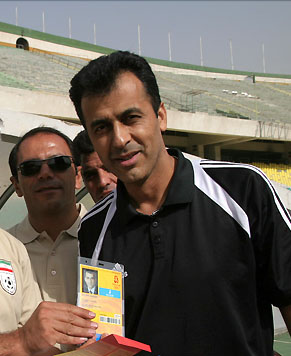
- Full name: Masoud Moradi
- Born: August 22, 1965 (age 61); Rudsar, Iran

Domestic
Years	League	Role
1988–2001	Azadegan League	Referee
2001–2010	Iran Pro League	Referee

International
Years	League	Role
2000–2010	FIFA listed	Referee

Masoud Moradi (Persian: مسعود مرادی, born August 22, 1965 in Roudsar) is an Iranian retired football referee. Moradi had been a FIFA international referee from 2000 until 2010.

Moradi has been an Iran Pro League referee since 1998 and is currently head of Islamic Republic of Iran Football Federation's refereeing department.

Moradi has been an official in major competitions including the:

- 2003 FIFA Confederations Cup
- 2004 AFC Asian Cup
- 2007 AFC Champions League
- 2007 AFC Asian Cup qualification
- 2007 Asian Cup.
- 2008 Beijing Olympics.
- 2010 AFF Suzuki Cup
