= Sheys Rezaei =

Iranian footballer and singer (born 1984)

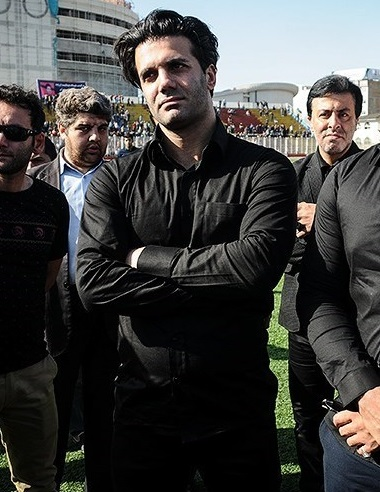
- Sheys Rezaei in 2016

Personal information
- Full name: Sheys Rezaei Khonakdar
- Date of birth: 2 April 1984 (age 42)
- Place of birth: Sari, Iran, Iran
- Height: 1.83 m (6 ft 0 in)
- Positions: Centre back; right back

Youth career
- 2001–2003: Saipa

Senior career*
Years	Team	Apps	(Gls)
2003–2008	Persepolis	84	(5)
2008–2009	Saba Qom	32	(1)
2009–2012	Persepolis	45	(1)
2012–2014	Shahrdari Tabriz	25	(0)
2014	Mes Kerman	11	(0)
2014–2015	Rah Ahan	6	(0)

International career^{‡}
2000–2001	Iran U17	3	(0)
2006	Iran U23	5	(0)
2006–2009	Iran	8	(1)
Medal record
Representing Iran
Asian Games
Bronze medal – third place	2006 Qatar	Team competition
West Asian Football Federation Championship
Gold medal – first place	2007 Jordan	Team competition
- * Club domestic league appearances and goals as of 7 August 2014 ‡ National team caps and goals as of 6 August 2009

Sheys Rezaei Khonakdar (Persian: شيث رضایی خنکدار, born 2 April 1984 in Sari, Iran) is an Iranian footballer and singer.

== Club career ==
Sheys is originally from Hamid Abad (one of Sari's suburbs). He has played most of his career for Persepolis and started to be known in 2005–06 season and became more famous after problems in 2007–08 season. He has featured in Iran's national U17, U23 and A teams. In June 2008 he was on trial with Bundesliga side VfB Stuttgart. He joined Saba Battery in August 2008. After spending one season with Saba and playing in the AFC Champions League he moved back to Persepolis. After completing the season with Persepolis in 2011–12, he was released by the club and joined the Azadegan League side, Shahrdari Tabriz.

=== Club career statistics ===
As of 7 August 2014

Club performance			League		Cup		Continental		Total	
Season	Club	League	Apps	Goals	Apps	Goals	Apps	Goals	Apps	Goals
Iran			League		Hazfi Cup		Asia		Total	
2003–04	Persepolis	Pro League	0	0	0	0	–		0	0
2004–05	Persepolis	Pro League	10	1	0	0	–		10	1
2005–06	Persepolis	Pro League	26	3	4	1	–		30	4
2006–07	Persepolis	Pro League	25	1	4	0	–		29	1
2007–08	Persepolis	Pro League	23	0	3	0	–		26	0
2008–09	Saba	Pro League	32	1	3	0	6	0	41	1
2009–10	Persepolis	Pro League	23	1	6	1	–		29	2
2010–11	Persepolis	Pro League	11	0	0	0	0	0	11	0
2011–12	Persepolis	Pro League	11	0	1	1	7	0	19	1
2012–13	Shahrdari Tabriz	Azadegan League	25	0	1	0	–		26	0
2013–14	Shahrdari Tabriz	Azadegan League	0	0	0	0	–		0	0
2013–14	Mes Kerman	Pro League	3	0	2	0	–		5	0
2014–15	Rah Ahan	Pro League	6	0	0	0	–		6	0
Total			193	7	24	2	13	0	240	9

== International career ==
He was a member of Iran national under-23 football team, participating in the 2006 Asian Games. In October 2006, he was called up to join senior Team Melli for the first time in an LG cup tournament held in Jordan. He made his debut for Iran on 4 October in a match against Iraq. He scored in his debut.

In June 2007, he was again called up to join the Iran squad in another tournament held in Jordan, where he helped Iran win the 2007 West Asian Football Federation Championship. In March 2009 under Ali Daei he was called up again for Team Melli.

=== International goals ===
Scores and results list Iran's goal tally first.

#	Date	Venue	Opponent	Score	Result	Competition
1	4 October 2006	Amman International Stadium, Amman	Iraq	2–0	2–0	Friendly

== Honours ==
=== Club ===
Persepolis

- Iran Pro League: 2007–08
- Hazfi Cup: 2009–10, 2010–11

=== National ===
Iran U23

- Asian Games Bronze Medal: 2006
