= Abolfazl Hajizadeh =

Iranian footballer (born 1981)

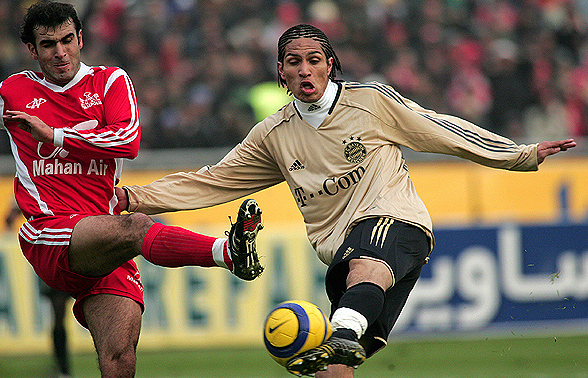
- Hajizadeh (Persepolis v. Bayern Munich, 2006)

Personal information
- Full name: Abolfazl Hajizadeh Kojabadi
- Date of birth: 23 August 1981 (age 45)
- Place of birth: Tabriz, Iran
- Height: 1.75 m (5 ft 9 in)
- Position: Defender

Team information
- Current team: 30
- Number: 9

Senior career*
Years	Team	Apps	(Gls)
2001–2005	Tractor	30	(9)
2005–2007	Persepolis	49	(4)
2007–2008	Saba Battery	19	(1)
2008–2009	PAS Hamedan	30	(1)
2009–2011	Saba Qom	61	(2)
2011–2012	Shahrdari Tabriz	19	(0)
2012–2014	Damash Gilan	40	(1)

International career
2002–2003	Iran U23	1	(0)
2002	Iran	1	(0)
Medal record
Representing Iran
Asian Games
Gold medal – first place	2002 Busan	Team competition
- * Club domestic league appearances and goals as of 12 June 2013

Abolfazl Hajizadeh (Persian: ابوالفضل حاجی‌زاده, born 23 August 1981) is an Iranian football player who played as a defender for Damash Gilan in Iran's Premier League football.

== Club career ==
He started his career at Tractor of Tabriz, and scored a goal in 2001–02. Having made some impressive performances, he was eventually noticed and was signed in 2005 by Iranian powerhouses Persepolis FC. On 10 July 2007 he signed a 2-year deal with Saba Battery F.C.

=== Club career statistics ===
As of 20 June 2014

Club performance			League		Cup		Continental		Total	
Season	Club	League	Apps	Goals	Apps	Goals	Apps	Goals	Apps	Goals
Iran			League		Hazfi Cup		Asia		Total	
2005–06	Persepolis	Pro League	26	2			–	–		
2006–07	Persepolis	Pro League	23	2			–	–		
2007–08	Saba	Pro League	19	1	1	0	–	–	20	1
2008–09	Pas	Pro League	30	1	3	0	–	–	33	1
2009–10	Saba	Pro League	31	2			–	–		
2010–11	Saba	Pro League	30	0	1	0	–	–	31	0
2011–12	Shahrdari Tabriz	Pro League	19	0	0	0	–	–	19	0
2012–13	Damash	Pro League	21	1	4	0	–	–	25	1
2013–14	Damash	Pro League	19	0	1	0	–	–	20	0
Career total			218	9			0	0		

== International career ==
Abolfazl Hajizadeh was a member of the national under-23 team in the unsuccessful 2004 Athens Olympics qualifying campaign.
