= Pejman Nouri =

Iranian footballer (born 1980)

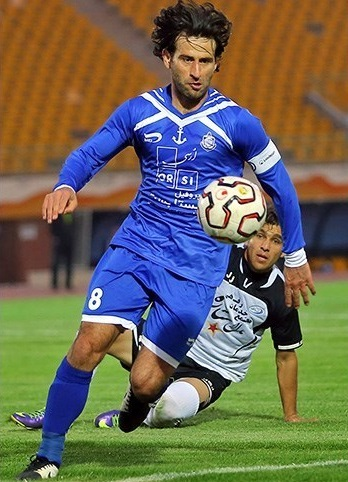

Personal information
- Full name: Pejman Nouri Roudsari
- Date of birth: 13 July 1980 (age 46)
- Place of birth: Rezvanshahr, Gilan, Iran
- Height: 1.74 m (5 ft 9 in)
- Position: Midfielder

Team information
- Current team: Malavan (president)

Youth career
- 1995–2001: Malavan

Senior career*
Years	Team	Apps	(Gls)
2001–2003	Malavan	47	(6)
2003–2005	Pegah Gilan	42	(8)
2005–2009	Persepolis	121	(7)
2009–2011	Malavan	64	(8)
2011–2012	Emirates	6	(1)
2012–2013	Malavan	31	(1)
2013–2014	Esteghlal	41	(0)
2014–2016	Malavan	41	(4)
2016–2017	Khooneh Be Khooneh	20	(4)
2017–2019	Malavan	41	(5)
Total		454	(44)

International career^{‡}
2005	Iran B	6	(0)
2003–2013	Iran	44	(4)

Managerial career
- 2019: Malavan (assistant)
- 2019–2023: Malavan (president)
- 2023–2024: Chooka Talesh
- 2024–: Malavan (president)
- * Club domestic league appearances and goals ‡ National team caps and goals as of 10 October 2026

Pejman Nouri (Persian: پژمان نوری; born 13 July 1980) is an Iranian football official, coach and a former player who played in the midfield position. He is the president of Malavan.

== Club career ==
Born in Rezvanshahr, Gilan Province, he has spent most of his career in Malavan and then Pegah, before being transferred to Persepolis.

=== Persepolis ===
The 2005–06 season was Pejman's first season in Persepolis which he was coached under Ali Parvin. He was noticed by a lot of the fans because of his hard work during the entire 90 minutes and mostly for his great speed.

The 2006–07 season was really difficult for Nouri because he had to play in the centre defense with fellow midfielder Farzad Ashoubi due to Persepolis's lack of defenders. He became more noticeable during this season and was given the nickname Gladiator by the fans and by the Iranian Sport writers.

During the 2007–08 season, he finally won the league with Persepolis during a season which he was once again pulled back from centre midfield to play as the left defender but in the last few weeks of the season he was put back in the centre midfield position and even scored in the second last game against Saba Battery.

He started the 2008–09 season by scoring the league's first goal against Saipa F.C. with a powerful 30-yard screamer. After Ghotbi resigned as Persepolis's coach, former player and veteran Afshin Peyrovani took over but he did not believe in Nouri as much as Ghotbi did. Nouri was really disappointed that he wasn't starting for Persepolis and almost left the team during the half season transfer period but he decided to stay with Persepolis and try to work things out and he was once again put in the line up by Peyrovani and even when Nelo Vingada took over, Nouri was still one of the starters both in the league and the AFC Champions League.

=== Return to Malavan ===
After six years he returned to Malavan and became the first captain. In the first league match of 2009–10 season he scored the winning goal of Malavan vs Mes Kerman. The match which Malavan won 2–1.

The third match of 2010–11 season against Mes was a great match for Nouri. After a very good run from the right flank he crossed the ball and the defender of Mes scored an own goal and after an equalizer by Mes, in final minutes of the match he scored the winning goal of Malavan.

In 2010–11 season, Nouri scored the winning goal of Malavan against his former club Perspolis, both in Azady stadium and in anzali. Some thought that he would not celebrate after scoring but he did and in Navad program he stated that he would always celebrate when he scores for Malavan because he owes his career to Malavan.

=== Emirates Club ===
He was transferred to the Emirates Club on loan in summer 2011. He made his debut in a match against Dubai Club and scoring his first goal for the club in a match against Al Wasl FC.

=== Second Return to Malavan ===
After so much struggle, in 2012–13, Pejman returned to his beloved club once again. He scored his first goal of the season on second week, in a 2–2 draw against Sanat Naft.

=== Esteghlal ===
Nouri joined Esteghlal in June 2013, with a one-year contract. He made his debut in a 2–1 win over Gostaresh Foolad.

== International career ==
Nouri made his debut for the Iranian national football team at the LG cup tournament held in Tehran in August 2003, coming on as a substitute against Iraq. He scored in his third appearance for Iran, in a match against Belarus in Minsk. In October 2006, he was called up to join Team Melli again for an LG cup tournament held in Jordan, as well as the 2007 Asian Cup qualifier against Chinese Taipei. During the time that Ali Daei was the head coach of Team Melli, Nouri was called up a few times but never played. After Afshin Ghotbi was appointed as the head coach for the national team, Nouri was called up again and became a regular starter during the last three matches of the qualification of the 2010 FIFA World Cup which once again proved how much Ghotbi believes in Nouri. Under Carlos Queiroz's management he has become a utility man and increasingly been used in the left back position.

== Statistics ==
As of 15 May 2015

Club performance			League		Cup		Continental		Total	
Season	Club	League	Apps	Goals	Apps	Goals	Apps	Goals	Apps	Goals
Iran			League		Hazfi Cup		Asia		Total	
2001–02	Malavan	Pro League	22	5			–			
2002–03	Malavan	Pro League	25	1			–			
2003–04	Pegah	Pro League	21	8			–			
2004–05	Pegah	Pro League	21	0			–			
2005–06	Persepolis	Pro League	29	1	4	1	–		33	2
2006–07	Persepolis	Pro League	28	2	3	0	–		31	2
2007–08	Persepolis	Pro League	33	1	3	0	–		36	3
2008–09	Persepolis	Pro League	31	3	3	0	6	0	40	3
2009–10	Malavan	Pro League	32	3	2	0	–		34	3
2010–11	Malavan	Pro League	32	5	6	1	–		38	6
United Arab Emirates			League		President's Cup		Asia		Total	
2011–12	Emirates	UAE League	6	1	3	0	–		9	1
Iran			League		Hazfi Cup		Asia		Total	
2012–13	Malavan	Pro League	31	1	1	0	–		32	1
2013–14	Esteghlal	Pro League	29	0	4	0	9	0	42	0
2014–15	Esteghlal	Pro League	12	0	2	0	–		14	0
2014–15	Malavan	Pro League	15	3	0	0	–		15	3
2015–16	Malavan	Pro League	26	1		0	–			1
Total	Iran		364	34			9	0		
Total	United Arab Emirates		6	1	3	0	0	0	9	1
Career total			370	35			9	0		

- Assist Goals

Season	Team	Assists
06–07	Persepolis	2
07–08	Persepolis	3
08–09	Persepolis	1
09–10	Malavan	6
10–11	Malavan	3
12–13	Malavan	4
13–14	Esteghlal	1

== Career statistics ==
=== International ===
Appearances and goals by national team and year
National team	Year	Apps	Goals
Iran	2003	3	1
Iran	2004	–	
Iran	2005	–	
Iran	2006	2	0
Iran	2007	1	0
Iran	2008	1	1
Iran	2009	10	0
Iran	2010	10	0
Iran	2011	7	1
Iran	2012	10	1
Iran	2013	1	0
Total		45	4

Scores and results list Iran's goal tally first, score column indicates score after each Nouri goal.

List of international goals scored by Pejman Nouri
No.	Date	Venue	Opponent	Score	Result	Competition
1	20 August 2003	Dinamo Stadium, Minsk, Belarus	Belarus	1–2	1–2	Friendly
2	19 December 2008	Sultan Qaboos Sports Complex, Muscat, Oman	China	2–0	2–0	2008 Oman International Tournament
3	5 October 2011	Azadi Stadium, Tehran, Iran	Palestine	6–0	7–0	Friendly
4	2 May 2012	Enghelab Stadium, Kalaj, Iran	Mozambique	3–0	3–0	Friendly

== Playing style ==
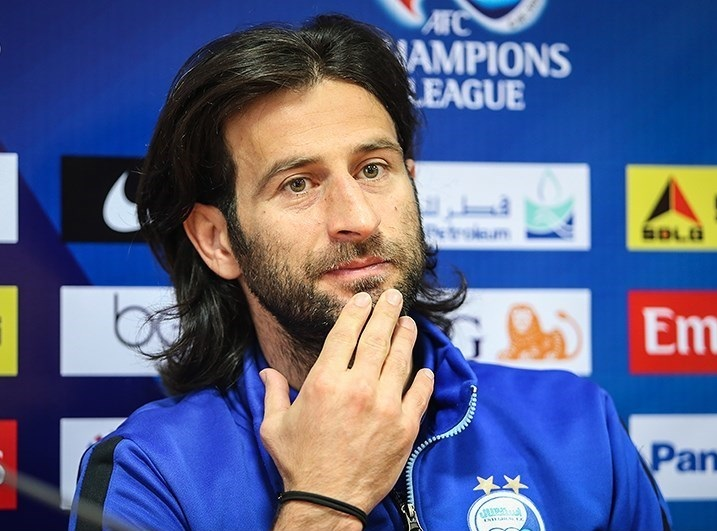
Norui in 2014

He plays as a center midfielder, but can also play as a defensive midfielder and even a left back. He is known for his hard work, stamina and dribbling. Also if he finds space, he will shoot from long range. He also poses a threat in free-kicks with his deft left-foot shots.

== Honours ==
Persepolis

- Iran Pro League (1): 2007–08

Iran

- Islamic Solidarity Games:
  - Bronze medal (1): 2005
