= 2010–11 Esteghlal F.C. season =

Esteghlal Tehran FC
2010–11 season
- President: Ali Fathollahzadeh
- Head coach: Parviz Mazloomi
- Stadium: Azadi Stadium
- IPL: 2nd
- Hazfi Cup: Semifinals
- Champions League: Group Stage
- Top goalscorer: League: Arash Borhani (14); All: Arash Borhani (16); Farhad Majidi (16)
- Highest home attendance: 98,000 vs Persepolis (15 October 2010)
- Lowest home attendance: 2,000 vs Malavan (15 May 2011)
- Average home league attendance: 27,353
Home colours	Away colours	Third colours

The 2010–11 season will be Esteghlal's 10th season in the Iran Pro League, and their 59th season in the top division of Iranian football. They will also be competing in the Hazfi Cup and AFC Champions League, and 66th year in existence as a football club.

== Club ==
=== Coaching staff ===
Position	Staff
Head coach	(Iran) Parviz Mazloomi
Assistant Coach	(Iran) Behtash Fariba
Assistant Coach	(Iran) Mahmoud Fekri
Second Coach	(Germany) Jürgen Gede
Fitness Trainer	(Iran) Behzad Noshadi
Goalkeeper Coach	(Iran) Hossein Torabpour
Technical Manager	(Iran) Mansour Pourheidari

Source: Varzesh3

=== Other information ===
Temporary Director	(Iran) Ali Fatollahzadeh
Football Academy President	(Iran) Reza Rajabi
Technical Adviser	(Iran) Morteza Mohasses
Analyzer	(Iran) Mahdi Arjanginia
Doctor	(Iran) Kaveh Sotoudeh
Physiotherapist	(Iran) Amin Norouzi
Psychologist	(Iran) Abbas Montazeri
Media Officer	(Iran) Mohammad Haayrani

== Player ==
=== First team squad ===
Last updated 7 December 2010

No.	Name	Nationality	Position (s)	Date of birth (age)	Signed from
Goalkeepers
1	Vahid Taleblou	(Iran)	GK	May 26, 1982 (aged 28)	(Youth system)
22	Mohammad Mohammadi	(Iran)	GK	September 20, 1977 (aged 32)	(Iran) Paykan
30	Maziar Shabani	(Iran)	GK	June 27, 1991 (aged 19)	(Youth system)
40	Mohammad Torkaman	(Iran)	GK	November 5, 1990 (aged 19)	(Iran) Gostaresh Foolad
Defenders
2	Amir Hossein Sadeghi	(Iran)	CB	September 6, 1981 (aged 28)	(Youth system) (Iran) Mes
3	Mehdi Amirabadi	(Iran)	RB, LB	February 22, 1979 (aged 31)	(Iran) Saipa
4	Hanif Omranzadeh	(Iran)	CB	April 30, 1985 (aged 25)	(Iran) PAS Hamedan
5	Bijan Koushki	(Iran)	CB	June 24, 1979 (aged 31)	(Iran) PAS Tehran
6	Hadi Shakouri	(Iran)	DF	May 2, 1982 (aged 28)	(Iran) Zob Ahan
16	André Luiz	(Brazil)	RB, LW	February 13, 1983 (aged 27)	(Brazil) Paraná
29	Tohid Gholami	(Iran)	DF	December 22, 1991 (aged 18)	(Youth system)
31	Javad Shirzad	(Iran)	LB	September 20, 1982 (aged 27)	(Iran) Foolad
33	Pejman Montazeri	(Iran)	DF	September 6, 1983 (aged 26)	(Iran) Foolad
Midfielders
8	Mojtaba Jabari	(Iran)	CM, AM	June 16, 1983 (aged 27)	(Youth system) (Iran) Aboumoslem
11	Hawar	(Iraq)	LW, LM	June 1, 1981 (aged 29)	(Iraq) Arbil
13	Mohsen Yousefi	(Iran)	LM	May 26, 1984 (aged 26)	(Iran) Saba Qom
14	Kianoush Rahmati	(Iran)	DM, CM	September 18, 1978 (aged 31)	(Iran) Saipa
15	Yaghob Karimi	(Iran)	MF	August 31, 1991 (aged 18)	(Youth system)
17	Farzad Ashoubi	(Iran)	DM, CM	June 4, 1980 (aged 30)	(Iran) Mes
26	Fardin Abedini	(Iran)	RM	November 18, 1991 (aged 18)	(Youth system)
32	Iman Mobali	(Iran)	AM, CM	November 3, 1982 (aged 27)	(United Arab Emirates) Al-Nasr
Forwards
7	Farhad Majidi (c)	(Iran)	ST	June 3, 1977 (aged 33)	(United Arab Emirates) Al-Ahli
9	Arash Borhani	(Iran)	ST	September 14, 1983 (aged 26)	(Iran) PAS Tehran
10	Milad Meydavoudi	(Iran)	RW, ST	January 20, 1985 (aged 25)	(Iran) Esteghlal Ahvaz
12	Mehdi Seyed-Salehi	(Iran)	ST	July 27, 1981 (aged 28)	(Iran) Paykan
25	Mojtaba Mojaz	(Iran)	ST	April 24, 1991 (aged 19)	(Youth system)
37	Esmaeil Sharifat	(Iran)	RM, RW	June 6, 1988 (aged 22)	(Iran) Esteghlal Ahvaz
Players transferred during the season
11	Anderson	(Brazil)	ST	March 22, 1983 (aged 27)	(South Korea) FC Seoul
18	Mehrshad Momeni	(Iran)	MF	August 15, 1987 (aged 22)	(Iran) PAS Hamedan
20	Felipe Alves	(Brazil)	DM, CM	March 25, 1982 (aged 28)	(Iran) Malavan
23	Omid Ravankhah	(Iran)	AM, CM	April 13, 1988 (aged 22)	(Iran) Fajr Sepasi

=== Iran Pro League squad ===
As of 1 September 2010. Esteghlal F.C. Iran Pro League Squad 2010-11

Note: Flags indicate national team as defined under FIFA eligibility rules; some limited exceptions apply. Players may hold more than one non-FIFA nationality.

No.	Pos.	Nation	Player
1	GK	IRI	Vahid Taleblou
2	DF	IRI	Amir Hossein Sadeghi
3	DF	IRI	Mehdi Amirabadi
4	DF	IRI	Hanif Omranzadeh
5	DF	IRI	Bijan Koshki
6	DF	IRI	Hadi Shakouri
7	FW	IRI	Farhad Majidi (c)
8	MF	IRI	Mojtaba Jabari
9	FW	IRI	Arash Borhani
10	FW	IRI	Milad Meydavoudi
11	MF	IRQ	Hawar
12	FW	IRI	Mehdi Seyed Salehi
13	MF	IRI	Mohsen Yousefi
14	MF	IRI	Kianoosh Rahmati
15	MF	IRI	Yaghob Karimi
16	DF	BRA	André Luiz

No.	Pos.	Nation	Player
17	MF	IRI	Farzad Ashoubi
19	FW	IRI	Ali Sabahi
20	MF	BRA	Felipe Alves
22	GK	IRI	Mohammad Mohammadi
23	MF	IRI	Omid Ravankhah
25	FW	IRI	Mojtaba Mojaz
26	MF	IRI	Fardin Abedini
28	FW	IRI	Ehsan Pirhadi
29	DF	IRI	Tohid Gholami
30	GK	IRI	Maziar Shabani
31	DF	IRI	Javad Shirzad
32	MF	IRI	Iman Mobali
33	DF	IRI	Pejman Montazeri
37	FW	IRI	Esmaeil Sharifat
40	GK	IRI	Mohammad Torkaman

=== AFC Champions League squad ===
As of 02 February 2011. Esteghlal F.C. Champions League Squad 2010-11

Note: Flags indicate national team as defined under FIFA eligibility rules; some limited exceptions apply. Players may hold more than one non-FIFA nationality.

No.	Pos.	Nation	Player
1	GK	IRI	Vahid Taleblou
2	DF	IRI	Amir Hossein Sadeghi
3	DF	IRI	Mehdi Amirabadi
4	DF	IRI	Hanif Omranzadeh
5	DF	IRI	Bijan Koshki
6	DF	IRI	Hadi Shakouri
7	FW	IRI	Farhad Majidi (c)
8	MF	IRI	Mojtaba Jabari
9	FW	IRI	Arash Borhani
10	FW	IRI	Milad Meydavoudi
11	MF	IRI	Iman Mobali
12	FW	IRI	Mehdi Seyed Salehi
13	MF	IRI	Mohsen Yousefi
14	MF	IRI	Kianoosh Rahmati

No.	Pos.	Nation	Player
15	MF	IRI	Yaghob Karimi
16	DF	BRA	André Luiz
17	MF	IRI	Farzad Ashoubi
20	MF	BRA	Felipe Alves
22	GK	IRI	Mohammad Mohammadi
23	MF	IRI	Omid Ravankhah
26	MF	IRI	Fardin Abedini
30	GK	IRI	Maziar Shabani
31	DF	IRI	Javad Shirzad
32	MF	IRQ	Hawar
33	DF	IRI	Pejman Montazeri
37	FW	IRI	Esmaeil Sharifat
40	GK	IRI	Mohammad Torkaman

== Transfers ==
=== Summer transfers ===
In: Note: Flags indicate national team as defined under FIFA eligibility rules; some limited exceptions apply. Players may hold more than one non-FIFA nationality.

No.	Pos.	Nation	Player
16	DF	BRA	André Luiz (from (Brazil) Paraná)
31	DF	IRI	Javad Shirzad (from Foolad)
17	MF	IRI	Farzad Ashoubi (from Mes Kerman)
20	MF	BRA	Felipe Alves (from Malavan)
32	MF	IRI	Iman Mobali (from (United Arab Emirates) Al Nasr)
37	MF	IRI	Esmaeil Sharifat (from Esteghlal Ahvaz)
10	FW	IRI	Milad Meydavoudi (from Esteghlal Ahvaz)
11	FW	BRA	Anderson (from (South Korea) FC Seoul)

Out: Note: Flags indicate national team as defined under FIFA eligibility rules; some limited exceptions apply. Players may hold more than one non-FIFA nationality.

No.	Pos.	Nation	Player
31	GK	IRI	Iman Sadeghi (to Steel Azin)
2	DF	IRI	Khosro Heydari (to Sepahan)
4	MF	IRI	Hossein Kazemi (to Steel Azin)
16	MF	IRI	Hashem Beikzadeh (to Sepahan)
19	MF	IRI	Mehran Noorafkan (released, to Bargh Shiraz)
21	MF	IRI	Milad Nouri (to Esteghlal Ahvaz)
28	MF	PER	Rinaldo Cruzado (to (Peru) Juan Aurich)
37	MF	BRA	Fábio Januário (to Sepahan)
--	MF	IRI	Mohammad Sadegh Barani (to Rah Ahan)
10	FW	IRI	Siavash Akbarpour (to Steel Azin)

==== Winter transfers ====
In: Note: Flags indicate national team as defined under FIFA eligibility rules; some limited exceptions apply. Players may hold more than one non-FIFA nationality.

No.	Pos.	Nation	Player
40	GK	IRI	Mohammad Torkaman (from Foolad Gostar)
11	MF	IRQ	Hawar (from (Iraq) Arbil FC)

Out: Note: Flags indicate national team as defined under FIFA eligibility rules; some limited exceptions apply. Players may hold more than one non-FIFA nationality.

No.	Pos.	Nation	Player
11	MF	BRA	Anderson (to (Brazil) Guarani)

== Competitions ==
Competition	Started round	Current position / round	Final position / round	First match	Last match
2010–11 Persian Gulf Cup	—	—	Runners-up	July 26, 2010	April 29, 2011
2011 AFC Champions League	Group stage	—	Group stage	March 1, 2011	May 11, 2011
2010–11 Hazfi Cup	Round of 32	—	Semi-final	October 19, 2010	June 2, 2011

Updated to match played 21 May 2011
Source: Competitions

=== Iran Pro League ===
==== Results by round ====
Round	1	2	3	4	5	6	7	8	9	10	11	12	13	14	15	16	17	18	19	20	21	22	23	24	25	26	27	28	29	30	31	32	33	34
Ground	A	H	A	H	H	A	H	A	A	A	H	A	H	A	H	A	H	H	A	H	A	A	H	A	H	H	H	A	H	A	H	A	H	A
Result	W	L	D	D	W	D	W	D	W	D	W	D	W	L	W	W	W	D	L	L	W	W	W	D	D	D	W	W	L	W	W	D	W	W
Position	1	6	9	10	6	6	3	3	3	3	2	2	2	4	3	2	2	2	2	5	2	2	2	2	3	3	3	3	3	3	2	2	2	2

Updated to match(es) played on 21 May 2011. Source: "Ipl".
A = Away; H = Home; W = Win; D = Draw; L = Loss

==== Results summary ====
Overall								Home						Away					
Pld	W	D	L	GF	GA	GD	Pts	W	D	L	GF	GA	GD	W	D	L	GF	GA	GD
34	18	11	5	55	34	+21	65	11	3	3	35	19	+16	7	8	2	20	15	+5

Last updated: 21 May 2011.
Source: FIFA.com

==== League standings ====
Pos	Team	Pld	W	D	L	GF	GA	GD	Pts	Qualification or relegation
1	Sepahan (C)	34	18	12	4	56	29	+27	66	Qualification for the 2012 AFC Champions League group stage
2	Esteghlal	34	18	11	5	55	34	+21	65	Qualification for the 2012 AFC Champions League Qualifying play-off
3	Zob Ahan	34	18	9	7	49	31	+18	63	Qualification for the 2012 AFC Champions League Qualifying play-off
4	Persepolis	34	17	7	10	50	36	+14	58	Qualification for 2012 AFC Champions League group stage (Note: Persepolis qualified to AFC Champions League group stage directly by winning the Hazfi Cup)
5	Tractor Sazi	34	15	12	7	42	29	+13	57	

Updated to match(es) played on 1 SEP 2018. Source: IPL Stats, Soccerway
Rules for classification: 1) Points; 2) Goal difference; 3) Goals scored.
(C) Champions

==== Matches ====
Win Draw Loss

July 26, 2010 1	Shahrdari Tabriz	2 – 3	Esteghlal	Tabriz
17:30 UTC+04:30	Daghighi 4' (yellow card); Karimi 87'; Tahmasebi (yellow card); Ghafouri (yellow card); Iranpourian		Borhani 28'; Maydavoodi 55', 59'; Rahmati (yellow card); Taleblou (yellow card)	Stadium: Yadegar-e Emam Stadium; Attendance: 40,000; Referee: Hedayat Mombeini

July 31, 2010 2	Esteghlal	1 – 2	Foolad	Tehran
19:40 UTC+04:30	Maydavoodi 10'; Shirzad (yellow card)		Norouzi 63', 68'; Shaverdi (yellow card); Khouraj (yellow card); Mujiri (yellow card); Khosravi (yellow card)	Stadium: Azadi Stadium; Attendance: 15,000; Referee: Yadolah Jahanbazi

August 5, 2010 3	Zob Ahan	1 – 1	Esteghlal	Isfahan
19:20 UTC+04:30	Hosseini 78'; Ahmadi (yellow card); Khalatbari (yellow card)		Majidi 41'; Meydavoudi (yellow card); Montazeri (yellow card); Amirabadi (yellow card); Ashoubi (yellow card)	Stadium: Foolad Shahr Stadium; Attendance: 10,000; Referee: Khodadad Afsharian

August 14, 2010 4	Esteghlal	2 – 2	Steel Azin	Tehran
20:45 UTC+04:30	Majidi 80'; Jabari 90+1'; Meydavoudi (yellow card); Rahmati (yellow card)		Gholami 16', 86'; Akbarpour (yellow card); Karimi (yellow card); Kaebi (yellow card); Zandi (red card) 90+1'	Stadium: Azadi Stadium; Attendance: 35,000; Referee: Mohsen Ghahremani

August 18, 2010 5	Esteghlal	3 – 0	Paykan	Tehran
21:45 UTC+04:30	Montazeri 59'; Maydavoodi 64'; Majidi 78'; Felipe Alves (yellow card); Omranzadeh (yellow card); Mahboub Mojaz (yellow card)		Abbasfard (yellow card); Junior (yellow card)	Stadium: Azadi Stadium; Attendance: 20,000; Referee: Mohsen Torki

August 22, 2010 6	Naft Tehran	0 – 0	Esteghlal	Tehran
21:30 UTC+04:30	Kouroshi		Shirzad (yellow card); Felipe Alves (yellow card); Mobali (yellow card)	Stadium: Azadi Stadium; Attendance: 25,000; Referee: Mahmoud Rafiei

August 27, 2010 7	Esteghlal	4 – 3	Sepahan	Tehran
21:15 UTC+04:30	Maydavoodi 17', 43'; Majidi 23'; Borhani 82'; Amirabadi (yellow card); Ashoubi (yellow card); Sadeghi (yellow card)		Beikzadeh 61'; Janjuš 73', 76'; Hosseini (yellow card); Hajysafi (yellow card); Jamshidian (yellow card)	Stadium: Azadi Stadium; Attendance: 85,000; Referee: Saeid Mozaffari Zadeh

September 10, 2010 8	Mes Kerman	1 – 1	Esteghlal	Kerman
18:48 UTC+04:30	Hasanzadeh 47'; Mansouri (yellow card); Hosseinkhani (yellow card)		Montazeri 86'	Stadium: Shahid Bahonar Stadium; Attendance: 15,000; Referee: Toraj Haghverdi

September 17, 2010 9	Esteghlal	3 – 2	Saipa	Tehran
19:45 UTC+04:30	Sadeghi (yellow card) (goal) 61'; Majidi 69'; Borhani 75'; Ashoubi (yellow card); Mobali (yellow card); Meydavoudi (yellow card)		Ansarifard 39', 90+1'	Stadium: Azadi Stadium; Attendance: 25,000; Referee: Mohsen Ghahremani

October 10, 2010 10	Saba Qom	1 – 1	Esteghlal	Qom
16:00 UTC+03:30	Sadeghi 63' (o.g.)		Borhani 4'; Omranzadeh (red card) 8'	Stadium: Yadegar-e Emam Stadium; Attendance: 10,000; Referee: Yadolah Jahanbazi

October 15, 2010 11	Esteghlal	1 – 0	Persepolis	Tehran
15:00 UTC+03:30	Majidi 90+1'; Rahmati (yellow card); Montazeri (yellow card); Meydavoudi (yellow card)		Shiri (yellow card); Badamaki (yellow card); Mohammad (yellow card)	Stadium: Azadi Stadium; Attendance: 98,000; Referee: Masoud Moradi

October 24, 2010 12	Tractor Sazi	1 – 1	Esteghlal	Tabriz
15:30 UTC+03:30	Karrar (yellow card) (goal) 52'; Teymourian (yellow card); Hosseini (yellow card)		Maydavoodi (yellow card) (goal) 45'; Sadeghi (yellow card); Ashoubi (yellow card) 90' (yellow-red card)	Stadium: Yadegar-e Emam Stadium; Attendance: 70,000; Referee: Mohsen Torki

October 29, 2010 13	Esteghlal	1 – 0	Rah Ahan	Tehran
17:45 UTC+03:30	Maydavoodi 57'; Omranzadeh (yellow card); Majidi (yellow card)		Amenah (yellow card); Roudbarian (yellow card)	Stadium: Azadi Stadium; Attendance: 20,000; Referee: Saeid Mozaffari Zadeh

November 4, 2010 14	Sanat Naft	2 – 0	Esteghlal	Abadan
15:30 UTC+03:30	Saki (yellow card) (goal) 29'; Pachajyan 76'; Navidkia (yellow card); Moshkelpour (yellow card)		Ravankhah (yellow card); Sadeghi (yellow card); Majidi (yellow card); Rahmati (yellow card)	Stadium: Takhti Stadium; Attendance: 20,000; Referee: Mohsen Ghahremani

November 12, 2010 15	Esteghlal	2 – 1	Shahin	Tehran
17:30 UTC+03:30	Ashoubi 35', 40' (pen.)		Heydari 63'; Lek Kcira (yellow card)	Stadium: Azadi Stadium; Attendance: 40,000; Referee: Saeid Bakhshi Zadeh

November 28, 2010 16	Malavan	0 – 1	Esteghlal	Anzali
15:00 UTC+03:30	Hamrang (yellow card); Rostami (red card) 82'		Omranzadeh (yellow card) (goal) 42'; Felipe Alves (yellow card)	Stadium: Takhti Stadium; Attendance: 10,000; Referee: Khodadad Afsharian

December 3, 2010 17	Esteghlal	3 – 2	Pas Hamedan	Tehran
15:00 UTC+03:30	Esmaeil Sharifat 37'; Borhani 45+2', 80'; Jabari (yellow card); Majidi (yellow card); Abedini (yellow card)		Kazemi 38'; Shahalidoost 89'; Aliabadi (yellow card)	Stadium: Azadi Stadium; Attendance: 15,000; Referee: Yadolah Jahanbazi

December 11, 2010 18	Esteghlal	0 – 0	Shahrdari Tabriz	Tehran
15:00 UTC+03:30	Mobali (yellow card) 40' (yellow-red card)		Tahmasebi (yellow card); Goudarzi (yellow card); Pirzadeh (yellow card) 43' (yellow-red card)	Stadium: Azadi Stadium; Attendance: 5,000; Referee: Mahmood Rafiei

December 19, 2010 19	Foolad	4 – 1	Esteghlal	Ahvaz
16:15 UTC+03:30	Sarlak 15'; Afshin 32'; Norouzi 34'; Hamoudi 38'; Khouraj (yellow card); Chamanara (yellow card); Mujiri (yellow card)		Ashoubi 63' (pen.); Sharifat (yellow card); Omranzadeh (yellow card); Jabari (red card) 89'	Stadium: Takhti Stadium; Attendance: 15,000; Referee: Masoud Moradi

December 23, 2010 20	Esteghlal	1 – 2	Zob Ahan	Tehran
16:15 UTC+03:30	Borhani (yellow card) (goal) 20'; Felipe Alves (yellow card)		Rafkhaei 63'; Khalatbari (yellow card) (goal) 83' (pen.); Hadadifar (yellow card); Ghazi (yellow card); Ahmadi (yellow card); Farhadi (yellow card)	Stadium: Azadi Stadium; Attendance: 25,000; Referee: Mohsen Torki

February 6, 2011 21	Steel Azin	1 – 3	Esteghlal	Tehran
15:45 UTC+03:30	Zandi 24'; Borjlou (yellow card); Ashjari (yellow card); Imani (red card) 60'		Majidi 4', 33'; Seyed Salehi 73'; Amirabadi (yellow card); Abedini (yellow card)	Stadium: Azadi Stadium; Attendance: 3,000; Referee: Toraj Haghverdi

February 13, 2011 22	Paykan	1 – 3	Esteghlal	Qazvin
14:45 UTC+03:30	Asgari 76' (pen.); Mirbozorgi (yellow card); Harsányi (yellow card)		Ashoubi 14' (pen.); Seyed Salehi (yellow card) (goal) 21'; Omranzadeh 80'; Sadeghi (yellow card)	Stadium: Shahid Rajaei Stadium; Attendance: 5,000; Referee: Mohsen Ghahremani

February 18, 2011 23	Esteghlal	3 – 1	Naft Tehran	Tehran
17:15 UTC+03:30	Seyed Salehi 22', 74'; Borhani 86'		Ferreira 38'; Nasehi (yellow card)	Stadium: Azadi Stadium; Attendance: 20,000; Referee: Saeid Mozaffari Zadeh

February 24, 2011 24	Sepahan	1 – 1	Esteghlal	Isfahan
16:15 UTC+03:30	Jamshidian 38'; Heydari (yellow card); Januário (yellow card); Touré (yellow card)		Seyed Salehi 90+1'; Rahmati (yellow card); Omranzadeh (yellow card); Majidi (yellow card)	Stadium: Foolad Shahr Stadium; Attendance: 20,000; Referee: Hedayat Mombeini

March 5, 2011 25	Esteghlal	0 – 0	Mes Kerman	Tehran
17:30 UTC+03:30	Sadeghi (yellow card)		Pouladi (yellow card)	Stadium: Azadi Stadium; Attendance: 5,000; Referee: Alireza Faghani

March 10, 2011 26	Saipa	0 – 0	Esteghlal	Tehran
17:30 UTC+03:30	Yousefzadeh (yellow card); Mahmoudi (yellow card); Gholamnejad (yellow card)		Seyed Salehi (yellow card)	Stadium: Azadi Stadium; Attendance: 5,000; Referee: Yadolah Jahanbazi

March 20, 2011 27	Esteghlal	2 – 0	Saba Qom	Tehran
17:40 UTC+03:30	Borhani 57', 78'; Sadeghi (yellow card); Ashoubi (yellow card)		Vaezi (yellow card); Farzaneh (yellow card)	Stadium: Azadi Stadium; Attendance: 5,000; Referee: Mahmood Rafiei

March 30, 2011 28	Persepolis	0 – 1	Esteghlal	Tehran
17:05 UTC+04:30	Badamaki (yellow card)		Borhani 43'; Sadeghi (yellow card); Amirabadi (yellow card)	Stadium: Azadi Stadium; Attendance: 65,000; Referee: Mohsen Torki

April 10, 2011 29	Esteghlal	1 – 2	Tractor Sazi	Tehran
19:00 UTC+04:30	Seyed Salehi 34'; Mobali (yellow card); Rahmati (yellow card); Sharifat (red card) 90+2'		Nosrati 8'; Karrar 86'; Kiani (yellow card); Alizadeh (yellow card)	Stadium: Azadi Stadium; Attendance: 45,000; Referee: Toraj Haghverdi

April 14, 2011 30	Rah Ahan	0 – 1	Esteghlal	Tehran
19:00 UTC+04:30	Pashaei (yellow card)		Hawar 47'; Ashoubi (yellow card); Montazeri (yellow card)	Stadium: Azadi Stadium; Attendance: 8,000; Referee: Mohsen Ghahremani

April 23, 2011 31	Esteghlal	6 – 2	Sanat Naft	Tehran
18:10 UTC+04:30	Seyed Salehi 21', 68'; Jabari 28'; Shakouri 53'; Majidi 65'; Borhani 90+1'; Ashoubi (yellow card)		Pachajyan 9'; Arab 81'; Mirtoroghi (yellow card)	Stadium: Azadi Stadium; Attendance: 5,000; Referee: Mohsen Torki

April 28, 2011 32	Shahin	0 – 0	Esteghlal	Bushehr
18:00 UTC+04:30	Petrovic (yellow card); Emad (yellow card)		Seyed Salehi (yellow card); Mohammadi (yellow card); Sadeghi (yellow card); Shakouri (yellow card)	Stadium: Shahid Beheshti Stadium; Attendance: 20,000; Referee: Hedayat Mombeini

May 15, 2011 33	Esteghlal	2 – 0	Malavan	Tehran
18:00 UTC+04:30	Borhani 31'; Hawar 61'; Majidi (yellow card); Omranzadeh (yellow card)		Tamini (yellow card)	Stadium: Azadi Stadium; Attendance: 2,000; Referee: Mahmoud Rafiei

May 20, 2011 34	Pas Hamedan	0 – 2	Esteghlal	Hamedan
18:00 UTC+04:30			Amirabadi (yellow card); Borhani 36'; Majidi 82'	Stadium: Shahid Mofatteh Stadium; Attendance: 15,000; Referee: Saeid Mozaffari Zadeh

Last updated: 22 May 2011.
Source: IPL

=== AFC Champions League ===
==== Group stage ====
Group B
Team	Pld	W	D	L	GF	GA	GD	Pts
(Qatar) Al-Sadd	6	2	4	0	8	6	+2	10
(Saudi Arabia) Al-Nassr	6	2	2	2	10	7	+3	8
(Iran) Esteghlal	6	2	2	2	11	10	+1	8
(Uzbekistan) Pakhtakor	6	1	2	3	8	14	−6	5

Win Draw Loss

1 March 2011 1	Esteghlal (Iran)	1 – 1	(Qatar) Al-Sadd	Tehran
17:30 UTC+03:30	Omranzadeh (yellow card) 8'; Majidi 27', (yellow card) 75'; Mobali (yellow card) 29'; Amirabadi (yellow card) 49'; Borhani (yellow card) 74'	Report	(yellow card) 18' Al-Bloushi; (yellow card) 27' Rizik; 88' Keita	Stadium: Azadi Stadium; Attendance: 15,000; Referee: (South Korea) Kim Dong-Jin

15 March 2011 2	Al-Nassr (Saudi Arabia)	2 – 1	(Iran) Esteghlal	Riyadh
20:30 UTC+03:00	Abbas (yellow card) 34'; Sulaimani 60'; Howsawi (yellow card) 67'; Al-Harthi (yellow card) 81', (goal) 81'; Figueroa (yellow card) 84'	Report	21' (yellow card) 35' Omranzadeh	Stadium: King Fahd International Stadium; Attendance: 12,878; Referee: (Oman) Abdullah Al Hilali

6 April 2011 3	Esteghlal (Iran)	4 – 2	(Uzbekistan) Pakhtakor	Tehran
17:30 UTC+04:30	Shakouri (yellow card) 5'; Hawar 12'; Majidi 23'; Seyed Salehi (yellow card) 57', (goal) 57'; Borhani 90+3'	Report	4' Savić; (yellow card) 11' Juraev; (yellow card) 78' Abdukholiqov; 90' Shikhov	Stadium: Azadi Stadium; Attendance: 17,654; Referee: (United Arab Emirates) Ali Hamad Madhad Saif Albadwawi

19 April 2011 4	Pakhtakor (Uzbekistan)	2 – 1	(Iran) Esteghlal	Tashkent
18:00 UTC+05:00	Krimets (yellow card) 14', (goal) 88'; Andreev 28'; Suyunov (yellow card) 68'	Report	45', (yellow card) 71' Borhani; (yellow card) 65' (yellow-red card) 86' Omranzadeh	Stadium: Pakhtakor Markaziy Stadium; Attendance: 7,000; Referee: (Japan) Yuichi Nishimura

3 May 2011 5	Al-Sadd (Qatar)	2 – 2	(Iran) Esteghlal	Doha
18:25 UTC+03:00	Khalfan Ibrahim 54'; Leandro 76'; Lee Jung-Soo (yellow card) 88'	Report	6', 37' Majidi; (yellow card) 10' Hawar; (yellow card) 80' Rahmati	Stadium: Jassim Bin Hamad Stadium; Attendance: 5,060; Referee: (Australia) Ben Williams

11 May 2011 6	Esteghlal (Iran)	2 – 1	(Saudi Arabia) Al-Nassr	Tehran
18:00 UTC+04:30	Borhani (yellow card) 29'; Majidi 62'; Hawar 89'	Report	(yellow card) 44' Eid; (yellow card) 55' Bernaoy; 60' Al-Mutwa; (yellow card) 90+4' Enezi	Stadium: Azadi Stadium; Attendance: 85,422; Referee: (Japan) Maasaki Toma

=== Hazfi Cup ===
==== Matches ====
Win Draw Loss

===== Round of 32 =====
October 19, 2010 1/32	Pas Hamedan	1 – 4	Esteghlal	Hamedan
15:00 UTC+03:30	Montazeri 46' (o.g.); Seifpanahi (yellow card)		15' Jabari; 69' Omranzadeh; 87' Montazeri; 93' Jabari; (yellow card) Ashoubi	Stadium: Qods; Attendance: 6,000; Referee: Hedayat Mombeyni

===== Round of 16 =====
November 20, 2010 1/16	Esteghlal	1 – 0	Shahin Boushehr	Tehran
16:15 UTC+03:30	Omranzadeh 113'; Amirabadi (yellow card); Omranzadeh (yellow card)		(yellow card) Noori	Stadium: Azadi; Attendance: 15,000; Referee: Masoud Moradi

===== Quarterfinals =====
January 31, 2011 1/4	Esteghlal	2 – 0	Shahrdari Yasuj	Tehran
14:45 UTC+03:30	Sharifat (yellow card) (goal) 20'; Sadeghi (yellow card) (goal) 64'; Seyed Salehi (yellow card)			Stadium: Takhti; Attendance: 2,000; Referee: Alireza Faghani

===== Semifinals =====
June 2, 2011 1/2	Malavan	2 – 1	Esteghlal	Bandar-e Anzali
17:00 UTC+04:30	Tamini 8' (yellow card) 64' (yellow-red card); Oladi 57'; Nozhati (yellow card); Hasani Sefat (yellow card)	report	(yellow card) Amirabadi; 74' (yellow card) Majidi; (yellow card) Ashoubi	Stadium: Takhti; Attendance: 20,000; Referee: Yadolah Jahanbazi

== Statistics ==
=== Appearances ===
No.	Pos	Nat	Player	Total		Iran Pro League		AFC Champions League		Hazfi Cup	
No.	Pos	Nat	Player	Apps	Goals	Apps	Goals	Apps	Goals	Apps	Goals
1	GK	(Iran) IRI	Vahid Taleblou	24	0	19+1	0	2+0	0	2+0	0
2	DF	(Iran) IRI	Amir Hossein Sadeghi	36	2	25+1	1	6+0	0	4+0	1
3	DF	(Iran) IRI	Mehdi Amirabadi	32	0	22+3	0	3+1	0	3+0	0
4	DF	(Iran) IRI	Hanif Omranzadeh	33	5	26+1	2	3+0	1	2+1	2
5	DF	(Iran) IRI	Bijan Koshki	8	0	3+5	0	0+0	0	0+0	0
6	DF	(Iran) IRI	Hadi Shakouri	21	1	8+8	1	2+2	0	1+0	0
7	FW	(Iran) IRI	Farhad Majidi	34	16	23+3	10	6+0	5	1+1	1
8	MF	(Iran) IRI	Mojtaba Jabari	26	4	18+1	2	3+2	0	2+0	2
9	FW	(Iran) IRI	Arash Borhani	31	16	20+3	14	4+1	2	3+0	0
10	FW	(Iran) IRI	Milad Meydavoudi	16	8	13+1	8	0+0	0	2+0	0
11	MF	(Iraq) IRQ	Hawar Mulla Mohammed	17	4	8+2	2	5+1	2	1+0	0
11	FW	(Brazil) BRA	Anderson Ricardo dos Santos	6	0	0+6	0	0+0	0	0+0	0
12	FW	(Iran) IRI	Mehdi Seyed Salehi	19	9	10+2	8	2+4	1	1+0	0
13	MF	(Iran) IRI	Mohsen Yousefi	9	0	4+3	0	0+0	0	0+2	0
14	MF	(Iran) IRI	Kianoosh Rahmati	34	0	19+7	0	5+0	0	2+1	0
15	MF	(Iran) IRI	Yaghob Karimi	1	0	0+1	0	0+0	0	0+0	0
16	DF	(Brazil) BRA	André Luiz de Oliveira Regatieri	18	0	12+3	0	1+0	0	2+0	0
17	MF	(Iran) IRI	Farzad Ashoubi	38	4	26+3	4	3+2	0	4+0	0
18	MF	(Iran) IRI	Mehrshad Momeni	3	0	0+2	0	0+0	0	0+1	0
19	FW	(Iran) IRI	Ali Sabahi	0	0	0+0	0	0+0	0	0+0	0
20	MF	(Brazil) BRA	Felipe Alves de Souza	26	0	15+6	0	2+0	0	2+1	0
22	GK	(Iran) IRI	Mohammad Mohammadi	21	0	15+0	0	4+0	0	2+0	0
23	MF	(Iran) IRI	Omid Ravankhah	9	0	2+5	0	0+0	0	1+1	0
25	FW	(Iran) IRI	Mojtaba Mahboub Mojaz	3	0	0+3	0	0+0	0	0+0	0
26	MF	(Iran) IRI	Fardin Abedini	7	0	2+4	0	0+0	0	0+1	0
28	FW	(Iran) IRI	Ehsan Pirhadi	1	0	0+1	0	0+0	0	0+0	0
29	DF	(Iran) IRI	Tohid Gholami	0	0	0+0	0	0+0	0	0+0	0
30	GK	(Iran) IRI	Maziar Shabani	0	0	0+0	0	0+0	0	0+0	0
31	DF	(Iran) IRI	Javad Shirzad	27	0	17+3	0	5+0	0	2+0	0
32	MF	(Iran) IRI	Iman Mobali	36	0	23+7	0	4+0	0	1+1	0
33	DF	(Iran) IRI	Pejman Montazeri	41	3	32+0	2	6+0	0	3+0	1
37	FW	(Iran) IRI	Esmaeil Sharifat	29	2	13+7	1	0+5	0	2+2	1
40	GK	(Iran) IRI	Mohammad Torkaman	0	0	0+0	0	0+0	0	0+0	0

=== Top scorers ===
Community Shield and Pre season goals are not recognized as competitive match goals.

All competitions

Scorer	Goals
(Iran) Arash Borhani	16
(Iran) Farhad Majidi	16
(Iran) Mehdi Seyed Salehi	9
(Iran) Milad Meydavoudi	8
(Iran) Hanif Omranzadeh	5
(Iran) Mojtaba Jabari	4
(Iraq) Hawar	4
(Iran) Farzad Ashoubi	4
(Iran) Pejman Montazeri	3
(Iran) Esmaeil Sharifat	2
(Iran) Amir Hossein Sadeghi	2
(Iran) Hadi Shakouri	1
TOTAL	72

Iran Pro League

Scorer	Goals
(Iran) Arash Borhani	14
(Iran) Farhad Majidi	10
(Iran) Milad Meydavoudi	8
(Iran) Mehdi Seyed Salehi	8
(Iran) Farzad Ashoubi	4
(Iran) Mojtaba Jabari	2
(Iraq) Hawar	2
(Iran) Pejman Montazeri	2
(Iran) Hanif Omranzadeh	2
(Iran) Esmaeil Sharifat	1
(Iran) Amir Hossein Sadeghi	1
(Iran) Hadi Shakouri	1
TOTAL	53

AFC Champions League

Scorer	Goals
(Iran) Farhad Majidi	5
(Iran) Arash Borhani	2
(Iraq) Hawar	2
(Iran) Mehdi Seyed Salehi	1
(Iran) Hanif Omranzadeh	1
TOTAL	11

Hazfi Cup

Scorer	Goals
(Iran) Mojtaba Jabari	2
(Iran) Hanif Omranzadeh	2
(Iran) Esmaeil Sharifat	1
(Iran) Amir Hossein Sadeghi	1
(Iran) Pejman Montazeri	1
(Iran) Farhad Majidi	1
TOTAL	8

Last updated: 22 May 2011.
Source: Goal.com

=== Top assistors ===
Includes all competitive matches.

Community Shield and Pre season assists are not recognized as competitive match assist.

Ranking	Position	Nation	Name	IPL	Champions League	Hazfi Cup	Total
1	FW	(Iran)	Farhad Majidi	8	1	0	9
2	MF	(Iran)	Iman Mobali	6	1	1	8
3	MF	(Iran)	Mojtaba Jabari	5	0	0	5
3	MF	(Brazil)	Felipe Alves	5	0	0	5
5	MF	(Iraq)	Hawar	3	1	0	4
5	DF	(Iran)	Javad Shirzad	1	1	2	4
7	FW	(Iran)	Arash Borhani	3	0	0	3
7	DF	(Iran)	Mehdi Amirabadi	3	0	0	3
9	MF	(Iran)	Milad Meydavoudi	1	0	1	2
9	DF	(Brazil)	André Luiz	2	0	0	2
11	FW	(Brazil)	Anderson	1	0	0	1
11	FW	(Iran)	Mehdi Seyed Salehi	1	0	0	1
11	MF	(Iran)	Kianoosh Rahmati	1	0	0	1
11	DF	(Iran)	Amir Hossein Sadeghi	1	0	0	1
TOTALS				41	4	4	49

Last updated: 22 May 2011.
Source: Goal.com

=== Disciplinary record ===
Includes all competitive matches. Players with 1 card or more included only.

Last updated on 22 February 2011

No.	Nation	Position	Name	IPL			Champions League			Hazfi Cup			Total		
No.	Nation	Position	Name	Yellow card	Yellow card Red card	Red card	Yellow card	Yellow card Red card	Red card	Yellow card	Yellow card Red card	Red card	Yellow card	Yellow card Red card	Red card
1	(Iran)	GK	Vahid Taleblou	1	0	0	0	0	0	0	0	0	1	0	0
2	(Iran)	DF	Amir Hossein Sadeghi	10	0	0	0	0	0	1	0	0	11	0	0
3	(Iran)	DF	Mehdi Amirabadi	5	0	0	1	0	0	2	0	0	8	0	0
4	(Iran)	DF	Hanif Omranzadeh	6	0	1	3	1	0	1	0	0	9	1	1
6	(Iran)	DF	Hadi Shakouri	1	0	0	1	0	0	0	0	0	2	0	0
7	(Iran)	FW	Farhad Majidi	5	0	0	1	0	0	1	0	0	7	0	0
8	(Iran)	MF	Mojtaba Jabari	1	0	1	0	0	0	0	0	0	1	0	1
9	(Iran)	FW	Arash Borhani	1	0	0	3	0	0	0	0	0	4	0	0
10	(Iran)	FW	Milad Meydavoudi	5	0	0	0	0	0	0	0	0	5	0	0
11	(Iraq)	FW	Hawar	0	0	0	1	0	0	0	0	0	1	0	0
12	(Iran)	FW	Mehdi Seyed Salehi	3	0	0	1	0	0	1	0	0	5	0	0
14	(Iran)	MF	Kianoosh Rahmati	6	0	0	1	0	0	0	0	0	7	0	0
17	(Iran)	MF	Farzad Ashoubi	7	1	0	0	0	0	2	0	0	9	1	0
20	(Brazil)	MF	Felipe Alves	4	0	0	0	0	0	0	0	0	4	0	0
22	(Iran)	GK	Mohammad Mohammadi	1	0	0	0	0	0	0	0	0	1	0	0
23	(Iran)	MF	Omid Ravankhah	1	0	0	0	0	0	0	0	0	1	0	0
25	(Iran)	FW	Mojtaba Mojaz	1	0	0	0	0	0	0	0	0	1	0	0
26	(Iran)	MF	Fardin Abedini	2	0	0	0	0	0	0	0	0	2	0	0
31	(Iran)	DF	Javad Shirzad	2	0	0	0	0	0	0	0	0	2	0	0
32	(Iran)	MF	Iman Mobali	4	1	0	1	0	0	0	0	0	5	1	0
33	(Iran)	DF	Pejman Montazeri	3	0	0	0	0	0	0	0	0	3	0	0
37	(Iran)	FW	Esmaeil Sharifat	2	0	1	0	0	0	1	0	0	3	0	1
TOTALS				67	2	3	13	1	0	6	0	0	86	3	3

Last updated: 22 May 2011.
Source: IPL

=== Goals conceded ===
- Updated on 21 May 2011

Position	Nation	Number	Name	Pro League	Champions League	Hazfi Cup	Total	Minutes per goal
GK	(Iran)	1	Vahid Taleblou	22	3	3	28	74.57 min
GK	(Iran)	22	Mohammad Mohammadi	12	7	0	19	98.53 min
TOTALS				34	10	3	47	84.26 min

=== Own goals ===
- Updated on 2 April 2011

Position	Nation	Number	Name	Pro League	Champions League	Hazfi Cup	Total
DF	(Iran)	2	Amir Hossein Sadeghi	1	0	0	1
DF	(Iran)	33	Pejman Montazeri	0	0	1	1
TOTALS				1	0	1	2

=== Overall ===
	Total	Home	Away	Neutral
Games played	44	22	22	N/A
Games won	23	15	8	N/A
Games drawn	13	4	9	N/A
Games lost	8	3	5	N/A
Biggest win	6–2 vs Sanat Naft	6–2 vs Sanat Naft	4–1 vs PAS Hamedan	N/A
Biggest loss	1–4 vs Foolad	1–2 vs Foolad; 1–2 vs Zob Ahan; 1–2 vs Tractor Sazi; 1–2 vs Al-Nassr; 1–2 vs Pakhtakor	1–4 vs Foolad	N/A
Biggest win (League)	6–2 vs Sanat Naft	6–2 vs Sanat Naft	3–1 vs Steel Azin; 3–1 vs Paykan; 2–0 vs PAS Hamedan	N/A
Biggest win (Cup)	4–1 vs PAS Hamedan	2–0 vs Shahrdari Yasuj	4–1 vs PAS Hamedan	N/A
Biggest win (Asia)	4–2 vs Pakhtakor	4–2 vs Pakhtakor	N/A	N/A
Biggest loss (League)	1–4 vs Foolad	1–2 vs Foolad; 1–2 vs Zob Ahan; 1–2 vs Tractor Sazi	1–4 vs Foolad	N/A
Biggest loss (Cup)	1–2 vs Malavan	N/A	1–2 vs Malavan	N/A
Biggest loss (Asia)	1–2 vs Al-Nassr; 1–2 vs Pakhtakor	N/A	1–2 vs Al-Nassr; 1–2 vs Pakhtakor	N/A
Clean sheets	16	9	7	N/A
Goals scored	74	45	29	N/A
Goals conceded	47	23	24	N/A
Goal difference	+27	+22	+5	N/A
Average GF per game	1.68	2.05	1.32	N/A
Average GA per game	1.07	1.05	1.09	N/A
Points	82/132 (62.12%)	49/66 (74.24%)	33/66 (50%)	N/A
Winning rate	53.49%	68.18%	38.1%	N/A
Most appearances	41	(Iran) Pejman Montazeri		
Top scorer	16	(Iran) Arash Borhani (Iran) Farhad Majidi		
Top assistor	9	(Iran) Farhad Majidi		

Last updated: 21 May 2011
Source: Competitive matches

== See also ==
- 2010–11 Persian Gulf Cup
- 2010–11 Hazfi Cup
- 2011 AFC Champions League
