= Vahid Talebloo =

Iranian footballer (born 1982)

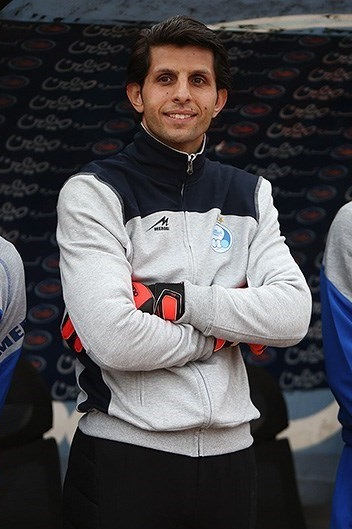

Personal information
- Full name: Vahid Talebloo
- Date of birth: 26 May 1982 (age 44)
- Place of birth: Tehran, Iran
- Height: 1.90 m (6 ft 3 in)
- Position: Goalkeeper

Youth career
- 1995–1997: Persepolis
- 1997–2002: Esteghlal

Senior career*
Years	Team	Apps	(Gls)
2002–2011	Esteghlal	173	(0)
2011–2012	Shahin Bushehr	30	(0)
2013–2015	Rah Ahan	11	(0)
2015–2016	Esteghlal	6	(0)
2016–2017	Foolad	14	(0)
Total		234	(0)

International career^{‡}
2003–2004	Iran U23	6	(0)
2006–2009	Iran	15	(0)
- * Club domestic league appearances and goals as of 1 December 2014 ‡ National team caps and goals as of 30 December 2009

Vahid Talebloo (Persian: وحيد طالب‌لو; born 26 May 1982 in Tehran, Iran) is a retired Iranian football goalkeeper.

== Club career ==
He began receiving media attention when he was able to save Ali Daei's spot kick in an IPL match at the beginning of the 2005/2006 season. Ever since then he has become the main goalkeeper for Esteghlal and was one of the keys to Esteghlal Tehran FC winning the IPL championship in the 05/06 season.

Among a series of good performances was his game against city rivals Persepolis in which he made eight saves including a penalty shot stop and three one-on-one grabs. In August 2006, Talebloo signed a one-year contract extension with Esteghlal F.C. although he had said that he will leave Esteghlal because the directors there had not kept the promises they made to him.

Talebloo extended his contract again with Esteghlal by signing a 2-year contract on 1 March 2007.

In 2007–08 Hazfi Cup, he took Esteghlal to the final himself by stopping penalties in matches against Zob Ahan, Rah Ahan and Foolad. His most memorable stop was against Iranian legend Ali Daei. He was a regular player in 2008–09 for Esteghlal and was one of the key players. He stayed in Esteghlal for another two seasons where he had to compete with Mohammad Mohammadi for a place on the team.

After Esteghlal bought the Team Melli keeper Mehdi Rahmati, he left Esteghlal for Shahin Bushehr in summer 2011 where he played most of the season but missed the last four matches due to the broken shoulder. He left Shahin after the team's relegation to the Azadegan League. After he was out for one season due to serious injury, he returns to the fields by signing a three-year contract with Rah Ahan.

=== Club career statistics ===
Club performance			League		Cup		Continental		Total	
Season	Club	League	Apps	Goals	Apps	Goals	Apps	Goals	Apps	Goals
Iran			League		Hazfi Cup		Asia		Total	
2002–03	Esteghlal	Pro League	12	0	1	0	-	-	13	0
2003–04	Esteghlal	Pro League	9	0	1	0	-	-	10	0
2004–05	Esteghlal	Pro League	9	0	0	0	-	-	9	0
2005–06	Esteghlal	Pro League	18	0	0	0	-	-	18	0
2006–07	Esteghlal	Pro League	21	0	0	0	-	-	21	0
2007–08	Esteghlal	Pro League	29	0	6	0	-	-	35	0
2008–09	Esteghlal	Pro League	33	0	1	0	5	0	39	0
2009–10	Esteghlal	Pro League	22	0	0	0	0	0	22	0
2010–11	Esteghlal	Pro League	20	0	2	0	2	0	24	0
2011–12	Shahin	Pro League	30	0	5	0	-	-	35	0
2013–14	Rah Ahan	Pro League	5	0	0	0	-	-	5	0
2014–15	Rah Ahan	Pro League	6	0	1	0	-	-	7	0
2014–15	Esteghlal	Pro League	2	0	0	0	-	-	2	0
2015–16	Esteghlal		4	0	1	0	-	-	5	0|
2016–17	foolad		14	0	3	0	-	-	17	0|
Total			234	0	21	0	7	0	262	0

== International career ==
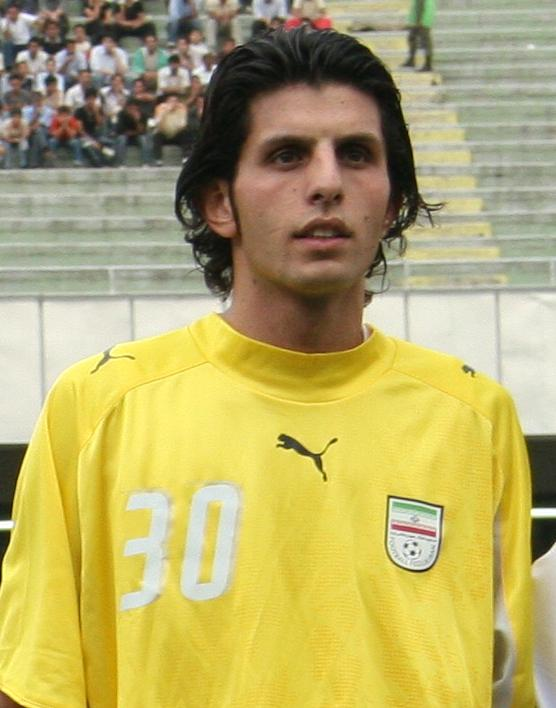
Talebloo before an Iran game

He made his debut for Iran in the Asian Cup 2007 qualifying match against Chinese Taipei in February 2006. In August 2006, Talebloo appeared against UAE and also against Syria in Amir Ghalenoei's first official games as the new Team Melli manager.

In July 2007, he joined the Iranian squad for the 2007 Asian Cup and appeared in Iran's last game against Korea Republic. Finally he got the chance to prove himself and played in West Asian Football Federation Championship 2008 and won the competition with Team Melli.

== Honours ==
=== Club ===
- Iran's Premier Football League
  - Winner: 2
    - 2005–06 with Esteghlal
    - 2008–09 with Esteghlal
  - Runner up:2
    - 2003–04 with Esteghlal
    - 2010–11 with Esteghlal
- Hazfi Cup
  - Winner: 1
    - 2007–08 with Esteghlal
  - Runner up: 2
    - 2003–04 with Esteghlal
    - 2011–12 with Shahin Bushehr
    - 2015–16 with Esteghlal

=== National ===
- Islamic Solidarity Games:
  - Bronze medal: 1
    - 2005
- West Asian Football Federation Championship:
  - Gold medal: 1
    - 2008

=== Individual ===
- Football Iran News & Events
  - Goalkeeper of the year (2006–07)
