= Iran football award winners =

The Iran Football award Winners is an annual association football award presented to Best Player, Coach and Referees in Iran, which recognises the most outstanding player in the Persian Gulf Pro League each season. The recipient is chosen by a panel assembled by the association football.

== IRIFF awards ==
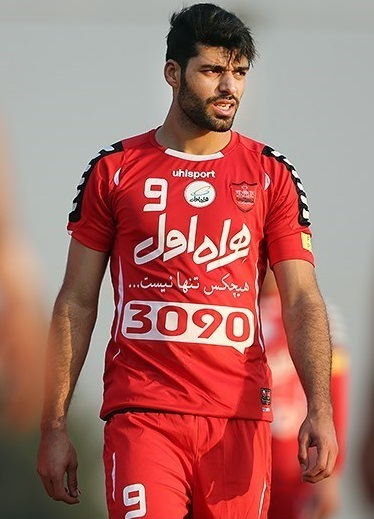
Mehdi Taremi was the first player to win the Player of the Season award in two consecutive seasons.

This award is organized by Iran football federation and includes the best Iranian footballers in each field. Mehdi Taremi and Moharram Navidkia have been Player of the Season on two occasions each and are the only players to have won the award more than once.with Taremi having achieved this in consecutive years (2015 and 2016).

Persepolis and Iran national football team goalkeeper Alireza Beiranvand won two awards at the 2018-19 Iran Professional League (IPL) season. Beiranvand won IPL Man of the Year award and was also honored as the best goalkeeper of the season.

Player of the year
Season	Player	Club	Source(s)
2002–03	(Iran) Moharram Navidkia	Sepahan	
2003–04	Award not given		
2004–06	Award not given		
2005–06	Award not given		
2006–07	(Iran) Javad Nekounam	Osasuna	
2007–08	(Iran) Mohsen Khalili	Persepolis	
2008–09	Award not given		
2009–10	Award not given		
2010–11	Award not given		
2011–12	Award not given		
2012–13	(Iran) Moharram Navidkia	Sepahan	
2013–14	(Iran) Andranik Teymourian	Esteghlal	
2014–15	(Iran) Ghasem Haddadifar	Zob Ahan	
2015–16	(Iran) Mehdi Taremi	Persepolis	
2016–17	(Iran) Mehdi Taremi	Persepolis	
2017–18	(Iran) Vahid Amiri	Persepolis	
2018–19	(Iran) Alireza Beiranvand	Persepolis	

== Manager of the year ==
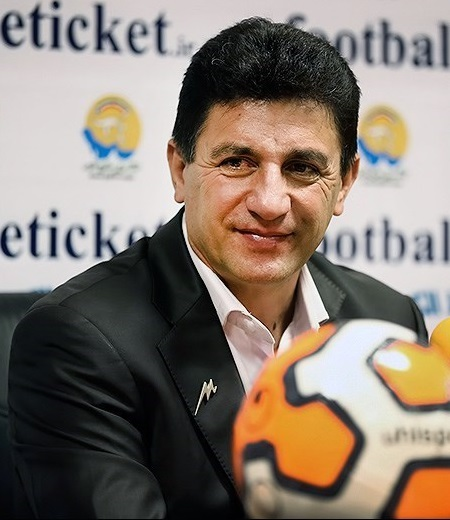
Amir Ghalenoei won Coach of the Year award for four times.

Manager of the year
Season	Coach	Club
2006–07	(Iran) Ali Daei	Saipa
2007–08	(Iran) (United States) Afshin Ghotbi	Persepolis
2008–09	(Iran) Amir Ghalenoei	Esteghlal
2009–10	(Iran) Amir Ghalenoei	Sepahan
2010–11	(Iran) Amir Ghalenoei	Sepahan
2011–12	(Croatia) Zlatco Kranjčar	Sepahan
2012–13	(Iran) Amir Ghalenoei	Esteghlal
2013–14	(Iran) Hossein Faraki	Foolad
2014–15	(Iran) Hossein Faraki	Sepahan
2015–16	(Iran) Abdollah Veisi	Esteghlal Khuzestan
2016–17	(Croatia) Branko Ivanković	Persepolis
2017–18	(Croatia) Branko Ivanković	Persepolis
2018–19	(Croatia) Branko Ivanković	Persepolis
2019–20	(Iran) Yahya Golmohammadi	Persepolis

== Young player of the year ==
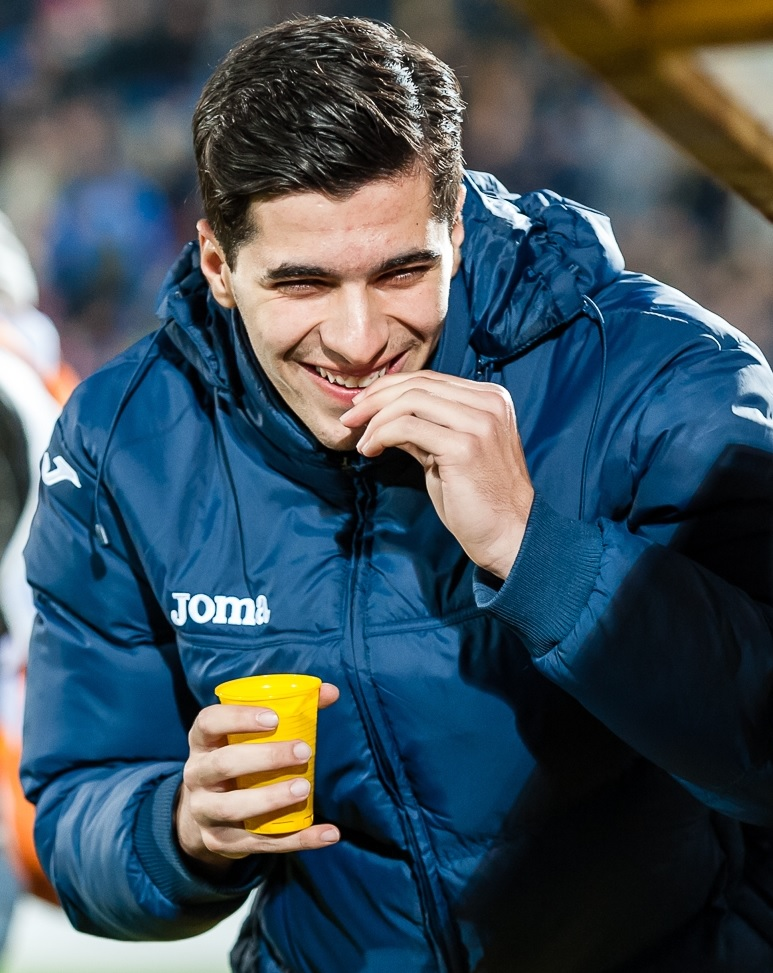
Saeid Ezzatollahi won the award in 2013.

Young player of the year
Season	Player	Club	Source(s)
2006–07	(Iran) Farzad Ashoubi	Persepolis	
2007–08	(Iran) Ehsan Hajsafi	Sepahan	
2008–09	Award not given		
2009–10	Award not given		
2010–11	Award not given		
2011–12	Award not given		
2012–13	(Iran) Saeid Ezzatollahi	Malavan	
2013–14	(Iran) Mohammad Abbaszadeh	Persepolis	
2014–15	(Iran) Amir Arsalan Motahari	Naft Tehran	
2015–16	(Iran) Mehdi Torabi	Saipa	
2016–17	(Iran) Omid Noorafkan	Esteghlal	
2017–18	(Iran) Ali Gholizadeh	Saipa	
2018–19	(Iran) Allahyar Sayyadmanesh	Esteghlal	
2019–20	(Iran) Mehdi Ghayedi	Esteghlal	

== Top assister of the year ==
Top assister of the year
Season	Player	Club	Source(s)
2016–17	(Iran) Iman Mobali	Naft Tehran	
2017–18	(Uzbekistan) Server Djeparov	Esteghlal	
2018–19	(Iran) Mohammad Karimi	Sepahan	
2019–20	(Iran) Mehdi Ghayedi (Iran) Milad Jahani	Esteghlal Sanat Naft	

== Goalkeeper of the year ==
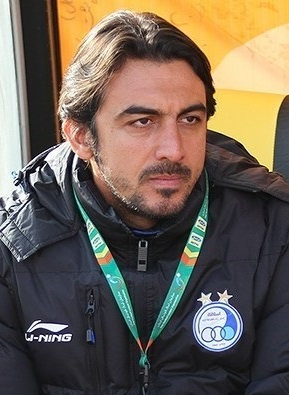
Mehdi Rahmati has won the award for four times.

Goalkeeper of the year
seoson	player	club
2006–07	(Iran) Vahid Taleblou	Esteghlal
2007–08	(Iran) Mehdi Rahmati	Mes Kerman
2008–09	Not Chosen	
2009–10	Not Chosen	
2010–11	(Iran) Mehdi Rahmati	Esteghlal
2011–12	(Iran) Mehdi Rahmati	Esteghlal
2012–13	(Iran) Mehdi Rahmati	Esteghlal
2013–14	(Brazil) Nilson Corrêa	Persepolis
2014–15	(Iran) Alireza Beiranvand	Naft Tehran
2015–16	(Brazil) Fernando de Jesus	Esteghlal Khuzestan
2016–17	(Iran) Alireza Beiranvand	Persepolis
2017–18	(Iran) Alireza Beiranvand	Persepolis
2018–19	(Iran) Alireza Beiranvand	Persepolis

== Defender of the year ==
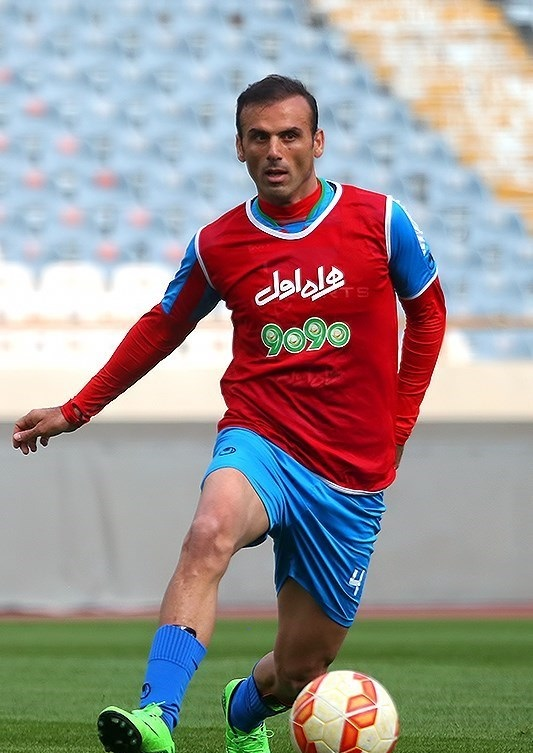
Jalal Hosseini has won the award for seven times.

Defender of the year
seoson	Player	Club	Source(s)
2006–07	(Iran) Jalal Hosseini	Saipa	
2007–08	(Iran) Jalal Hosseini	Saipa	
2008–09	Award not given		
2009–10	(Iran) Ehsan Hajsafi	Sepahan	
2010–11	(Iran) Khosro Heydari	Sepahan	
2011–12	(Iran) Ehsan Hajsafi	Sepahan	
2012–13	(Iran) Pejman Montazeri	Esteghlal	
2013–14	(Iran) Jalal Hosseini	Persepolis	
2014–15	(Iran) Voria Ghafouri	Sepahan	
2015–16	(Iran) Jalal Hosseini	Naft Tehran	
2016–17	(Iran) Jalal Hosseini	Persepolis	
2017–18	(Iran) Jalal Hosseini	Persepolis	
2018–19	(Iran) Jalal Hosseini	Persepolis	

== Midfielder of the year ==
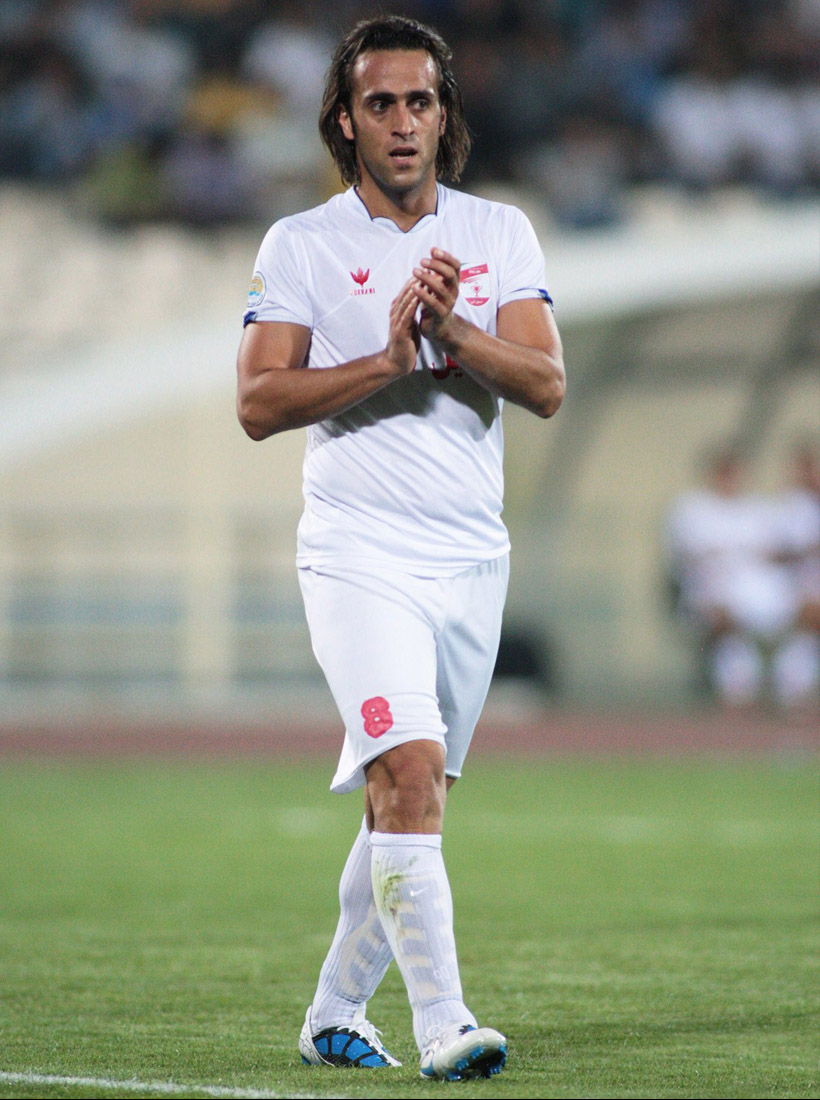
Ali Karimi won the award twice.

Midfielder of the year
seoson	Player	Club	Source(s)
2006–07	(Iran) Javad Nekounam	Osasuna	
2007–08	(Iran) Karim Bagheri	Persepolis	
2008–09	Award not given		
2009–10	(Iran) Ali Karimi	Steel Azin	
2010–11	(Iran) Ebrahim Sadeghi	Saipa	
2011–12	(Iran) Ali Karimi	Persepolis	
2012–13	(Iran) Moharram Navidkia	Sepahan	
2013–14	(Iran) Andranik Teymourian	Esteghlal	
2014–15	(Iran) Andranik Teymourian	Tractor Sazi	
2015–16	(Iran) Omid Ebrahimi	Esteghlal	
2016–17	(Iran) Omid Ebrahimi	Esteghlal	
2017–18	(Iran) Omid Ebrahimi	Esteghlal	
2018–19	(Iran) Mehdi Kiani	Sepahan	

== Striker of the year ==
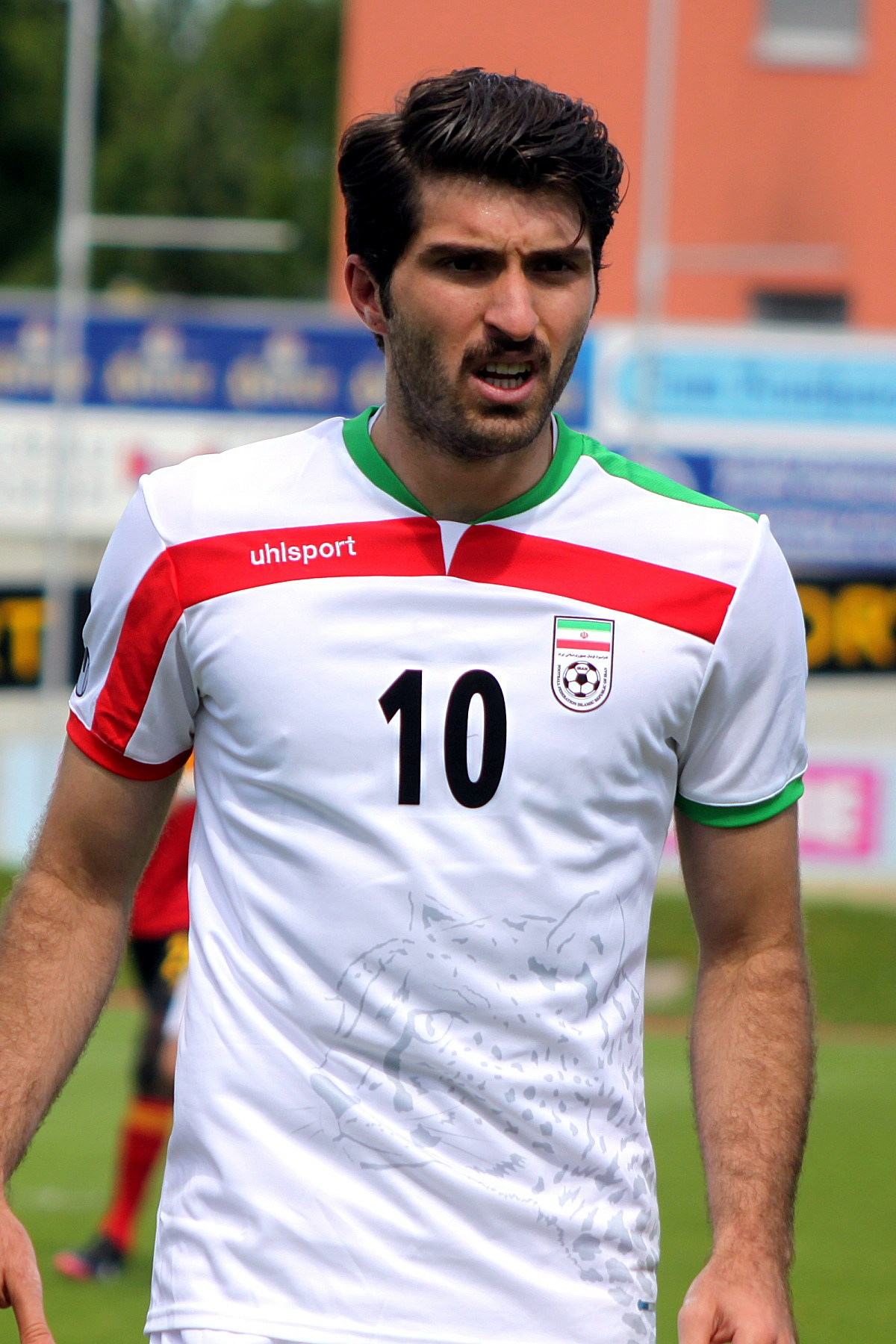
Karim Ansarifard won the award twice.

Striker of the year
seoson	Player	Club
2006–07	(Nigeria) Daniel Olerum	Aboomoslem
2007–08	(Iran) Mohsen Khalili	Persepolis
2008–09	Not Chosen	
2009–10	Not Chosen	
2010–11	Not Chosen	
2011–12	(Iran) Karim Ansarifard	Saipa
2012–13	(Iran) Jalal Rafkhaei	Malavan
2013–14	(Iran) Karim Ansarifard	Tractor Sazi
2014–15	(Iran) Mehdi Taremi	Persepolis
2015–16	(Iran) Mehdi Taremi	Persepolis
2016–17	(Iran) Mehdi Taremi	Persepolis
2017–18	(Iran) Ali Alipour	Persepolis
2018–19	(Brazil) Chimba & (Brazil) Kiros Stanlley	Foolad & Sepahan

== Foreign player of the year ==
Foreign player of the year
seoson	Player	Club
2002–03	(Armenia) Armenak Petrosyan	Sepahan
2003–04	Not Chosen	
2004–05	Not Chosen	
2005–06	Not Chosen	
2006–07	(Nigeria) Daniel Olerum	Aboomoslem
2007–08	(Serbia) Ivan Petrović	Aboomoslem

== Referee of the year ==
Referee of the year
seoson	Referee
2006–07	Saeid Mozaffari Zadeh
2007–08	Saeid Mozaffari Zadeh
2008–09	Saeid Mozaffari Zadeh
2009–10	Saeid Mozaffari Zadeh
2010–11	Alireza Faghani
2011–12	Mohsen Torky
2012–13	Saeid Mozaffari Zadeh
2013–14	Alireza Faghani
2014–15	Ahmad Salehi
2015–16	Mohsen Torky
2016–17	Alireza Faghani
2017–18	Bijan Heydari
2018–19	Alireza Faghani
