= Mehdi Rahmati =

Iranian footballer & coach (born 1983)

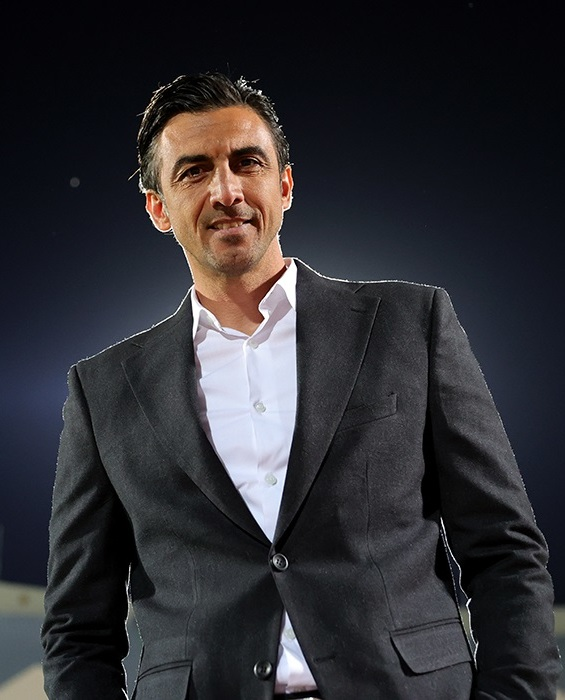
- Rahmati in 2022

Personal information
- Full name: Seyed Mehdi Rahmati Oskuei
- Date of birth: February 3, 1983 (age 43)
- Place of birth: Tehran, Iran
- Height: 1.87 m (6 ft 2 in)
- Position: Goalkeeper

Team information
- Current team: Gol Gohar (manager)

Youth career
- 1995–1997: Pas Tehran
- 1997–2001: Fajr Sepasi

Senior career*
| Years | Team | Apps | (Gls) |
| 2000–2004 | Fajr Sepasi | 61 | (0) |
| 2004–2005 | Sepahan | 26 | (0) |
| 2005–2007 | Esteghlal | 23 | (0) |
| 2007–2009 | Mes Kerman | 65 | (0) |
| 2009–2011 | Sepahan | 62 | (0) |
| 2011–2014 | Esteghlal | 98 | (0) |
| 2014–2015 | Paykan | 29 | (0) |
| 2015–2019 | Esteghlal | 75 | (0) |
| 2019–2020 | Padideh | 29 | (0) |
| Total | | 468 | (2) |

International career^{‡}
| 2000–2002 | Iran U20 | | |
| 2002–2004 | Iran U23 | 6 | (0) |
| 2010 | Iran U23 (Wild Card) | 7 | (0) |
| 2004–2012 | Iran | 76 | (0) |

Managerial career
- 2020–2021: Padideh
- 2022–2023: Aluminium Arak
- 2023: Nassaji Mazandaran
- 2024: Havadar S.C.
- 2025: Shams Azar
- 2025–2026: Kheybar Khorramabad
- 2026–: Gol Gohar
Medal record
Representing Iran
Asian Games
| Gold medal – first place | 2002 Busan | Team competition |
- * Club domestic league appearances and goals as of 22:33, December 30, 2018 (UTC) ‡ National team caps and goals as of November 14, 2012

Seyed Mehdi Rahmati Oskuei (Persian: سید مهدی رحمتی اسکویی; born February 3, 1983) is an Iranian football coach and former player who currently manages Gol Gohar in the Persian Gulf Pro League. He played for the Iran national team between 2004 and 2013.

== Club career ==
=== Early career ===
Rahmati started his professional career with Fajr Sepasi in 2000, he stayed for four years at the club and made 40 appearances before transferring to Sepahan. After only one season with Sepahan, Rahmati again transferred, this time to Esteghlal. Although he had good performance in the Esteghlal squad, Vahid Talebloo had better performances and he proved himself as the number one keeper for Esteghlal

Rahmati again left this time to Mes Kerman where he played very well. He continued performing well in Mes and helped the club qualify for the AFC Champions League for the first time in the club's history. Persepolis showed some interest on him but he reject the bid.

=== Sepahan ===
On July 14, 2009, Rahmati signed a two-year contract with Sepahan for an approximate sum of $450,000 turning down an offer from Norwegian club Rosenborg BK. At Sepahan he was the first choice keeper for the entire season and one of the most important players that helped the club win the league. He repeated the same feat with Sepahan the next season, he was regarded as the league's best goalkeeper after his performances with Sepahan.

=== Esteghlal ===
He joined Esteghlal in July 2011 where he won the Hazfi Cup in the first season. He extended his contract for another season on June 18, 2012. On April 12, 2013, Rahmati achieved a recorded twenty-four clean sheets, equalling with Iker Casillas in a season. He also helped his team to win league title after four years. At the end of the season, he extended his contract with the club. After the retirement of Farhad Majidi, Rahmati was named as Esteghlal's captain.

=== Paykan ===
On June 18, 2014, Rahmati left Esteghlal and joined Paykan for $1.5 million, signing a two-year contract. He played his first match for Paykan in 3–4 home loss to Tractor Sazi Tabriz F.C in 2014 Shohada Cup

=== Return to Esteghlal ===
On June 29, 2015, Rahmati returned to his former club Esteghlal on a one-year contract. In 2018 he won the Hazfi Cup with Esteghlal. He holds the record for the most Appearance in Persian gulf league and is the first player who appeared in 18 consecutive seasons in Persian gulf league . Considered one of the best goalkeepers in Asia, He also holds the record of most clean sheet in Persian gulf league with (180).

=== Padideh ===
On June 16, 2019, Rahmati joined Padideh on a two-year contract.

== International career ==
He was part of the Iran national team in 2004 AFC Asian Cup but he did not play any match. He won the 2004 West Asian Football Federation Championship with Team Melli. He was again part of the team in 2007 AFC Asian Cup but he did not play any match again. Since the start of the 2010 FIFA World Cup qualification, he has been the number one keeper for Team Melli. He also played for Team Melli in the 2011 AFC Asian Cup qualification. He was one of the best players for Iran in 2010 FIFA World Cup qualification and 2014 FIFA World Cup qualification where his saves played an important role. Rahmati was the first choice keeper in West Asian Football Federation Championship 2010 and 2011 Asian Cup.

=== Retirement ===
On January 20, 2012, Mehdi Rahmati announced his temporary retirement from the national team, he stated in an interview "Maybe I cannot be at the service of Team Melli, so I temporarily announce my resignation." He added, "Due to some problems, I prefer not to say anything for the time being, but I have to say just one thing that I am not at the service of Team Melli for a while."

After the announcement Iran national team coach Carlos Queiroz made a comment that he respected Rahmati's decision and would not invite him any more. Many in the Iranian FA tried to convince him to invite Rahmati again but Queiroz said that he was not involved in the decision and he could not see any reason to negotiate this matter with Rahmati.

In March 2013 Rahmati made a comment that Queiroz should not be the coach of Iran and the best he could do was to help as the assistant. At the end of the season Rahmati apologised to the Iranian people but not Queiroz personally in Navad TV show. Before the final three matches in June 2013 for the World cup qualifications it was rumoured that the Iranian FA and Queiroz asked him to sign an apology letter provided by them which he refused. A month later in July 2013, Hadi Aghili revealed that Rahmati told him not to sign the apology and they will beg us to return after they lose the first match which did not happen. However Rahmati was present in Training Camp in October 2014, but he was never called for an international match.

== Personal life ==
Rahmati's family is of Persian and Iranian Azerbaijani from the Osku city of East Azerbaijan Province.

Mehdi Rahmati married in 2004. He has two children, Ali and Ata.

== Career statistics ==
As of 6 November 2019

Appearances and goals by club, season and competition
| Club | Season | League | | | Hazfi Cup | | Asia | | Total | |
| Club | Season | Division | Apps | Goals | Apps | Goals | Apps | Goals | Apps | Goals |
|---|---|---|---|---|---|---|---|---|---|---|
| Fajr | 2000–01 | Azadegan League | 5 | 0 | 2 | 0 | – | | 7 | 0 |
| Fajr | 2001–02 | Pro League | 11 | 0 | 1 | 0 | 2 | 0 | 14 | 0 |
| Fajr | 2002–03 | Pro League | 20 | 0 | 1 | 0 | – | | 21 | 0 |
| Fajr | 2003–04 | Pro League | 25 | 0 | 1 | 0 | – | | 26 | 0 |
| Fajr | Total | | 61 | 0 | 5 | 0 | 2 | 0 | 68 | 0 |
| Sepahan | 2004–05 | Pro League | 26 | 0 | 0 | 0 | 6 | 0 | 32 | 0 |
| Esteghlal | 2005–06 | Pro League | 12 | 0 | 0 | 0 | – | | 12 | 0 |
| Esteghlal | 2006–07 | Pro League | 9 | 0 | 0 | 0 | – | | 9 | 0 |
| Esteghlal | Total | | 21 | 0 | 0 | 0 | 0 | 0 | 23 | 0 |
| Mes | 2007–08 | Pro League | 33 | 0 | 1 | 0 | – | | 34 | 0 |
| Mes | 2008–09 | Pro League | 33 | 0 | 0 | 0 | – | | 33 | 0 |
| Mes | Total | | 66 | 0 | 1 | 0 | 0 | 0 | 67 | 0 |
| Sepahan | 2009–10 | Pro League | 33 | 0 | 1 | 0 | 6 | 0 | 40 | 0 |
| Sepahan | 2010–11 | Pro League | 32 | 0 | 4 | 0 | 7 | 0 | 43 | 0 |
| Sepahan | Total | | 65 | 0 | 5 | 0 | 13 | 0 | 83 | 0 |
| Esteghlal | 2011–12 | Pro League | 34 | 0 | 5 | 0 | 9 | 0 | 48 | 0 |
| Esteghlal | 2012–13 | Pro League | 34 | 0 | 4 | 0 | 8 | 0 | 46 | 0 |
| Esteghlal | 2013–14 | Pro League | 30 | 0 | 3 | 0 | 9 | 0 | 42 | 0 |
| Esteghlal | Total | | 98 | 0 | 12 | 0 | 26 | 0 | 136 | 0 |
| Paykan | 2014–15 | Pro League | 29 | 0 | 1 | 0 | – | | 30 | 0 |
| Esteghlal | 2015–16 | Pro League | 26 | 0 | 3 | 0 | – | | 29 | 0 |
| Esteghlal | 2016–17 | Pro League | 22 | 0 | 4 | 0 | 7 | 0 | 33 | 0 |
| Esteghlal | 2017–18 | Pro League | 10 | 0 | 4 | 0 | 4 | 0 | 18 | 0 |
| Esteghlal | 2018–19 | Pro League | 19 | 0 | 0 | 0 | 2 | 0 | 21 | 0 |
| Esteghlal | Total | | 77 | 0 | 11 | 0 | 13 | 0 | 101 | 0 |
| Padideh | 2019–20 | Pro League | 16 | 0 | 1 | 0 | 2 | 0 | 19 | 0 |
| Career total | | | 459 | 0 | 38 | 0 | 62 | 0 | 559 | 0 |

== Managerial record ==
As of match played 18 September 2023

Managerial record by team and tenure
| Team | From | To | Record | | | | |
| Team | From | To | P | W | D | L | Win % |
|---|---|---|---|---|---|---|---|
| Padideh | 31 August 2020 | 22 August 2021 | 34 | 10 | 8 | 16 | 29.41 |
| Aluminium | 13 March 2022 | 4 June 2023 | 43 | 13 | 22 | 8 | 30.23 |
| Nassaji | 6 June 2023 | present | 5 | 2 | 2 | 1 | 40.00 |
| Total | | | 82 | 25 | 32 | 25 | 30.49 |

== Honours ==
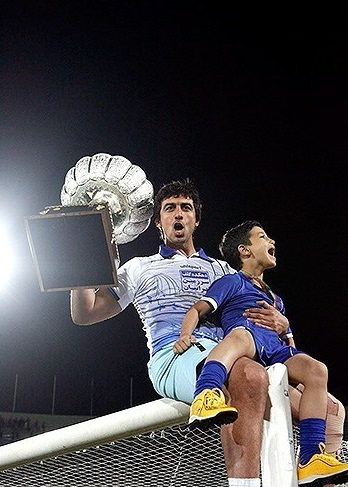
Rahmati after winning the league with Esteghlal

Fajr Sepasi

- Hazfi Cup: 2000–01

Sepahan

- Iran Pro League: 2009–10, 2010–11

Esteghlal

- Iran Pro League: 2005–06, 2012–13
- Hazfi Cup: 2011–12, 2017–18

Iran U23

- Asian Games Gold Medal: 2002

Iran

- WAFF Championship: 2004

Individual

- Football Iran News & Events
  - Goalkeeper of the year (2007–08, 2012–13)
- Iran Football Federation Award
  - Goalkeeper of the year (2007–08, 2012–13)
- Iran Football Federation Award
  - Player of the season (2012–13) (Second)
