= Rasoul Mirtoroghi =

Iranian footballer

Personal information
- Full name: Rasoul Mirtoroghi
- Date of birth: 20 February 1984 (age 42)
- Place of birth: Khomam, Iran
- Height: 1.90 m (6 ft 3 in)
- Position: Defender

Senior career*
| Years | Team | Apps | (Gls) |
| –2004 | Esteghlal Ahvaz | | |
| 2004–2006 | Pegah Gilan | | |
| 2006–2009 | Mes Kerman | 64 | (0) |
| 2009–2011 | Sanat Naft Abadan F.C. | 30 | (2) |
| 2011–2012 | Shahrdari Arak | | |
- * Club domestic league appearances and goals as of 5 September 2010 (UTC)

Rasoul Mirtoroghi (born February 20, 1984) is an Iranian footballer who plays for Sanat Naft Abadan F.C. in the IPL.

== Club career ==
In 2009, Mirtoroghi joined Sanat Naft Abadan F.C. after spending the previous seasons at Mes Kerman in the Iran Pro League.

| Club performance | | | League | | Cup | | Continental | | Total | |
| Season | Club | League | Apps | Goals | Apps | Goals | Apps | Goals | Apps | Goals |
| Iran | | | League | | Hazfi Cup | | Asia | | Total | |
|---|---|---|---|---|---|---|---|---|---|---|
| 2003–04 | Esteghlal Ahvaz | Persian Gulf Cup | 17 | 0 | | | - | - | | |
| 2004–05 | Pegah Gilan | Persian Gulf Cup | 21 | 0 | | | - | - | | |
| 2005–06 | Pegah Gilan | Azadegan League | | | | | - | - | | |
| 2006–07 | Mes | Persian Gulf Cup | 25 | 0 | | | - | - | | |
| 2007–08 | Mes | Persian Gulf Cup | 18 | 0 | 1 | 0 | - | - | 19 | 0 |
| 2008–09 | Mes | Persian Gulf Cup | 11 | 0 | | | - | - | | |
| 2009–10 | Sanat Naft Abadan F.C. | Azadegan | | 1 | | | - | - | | |
| 2010–11 | Sanat Naft Abadan F.C. | Persian Gulf Cup | 20 | 1 | 0 | 0 | - | - | 20 | 1 |
| Total | Iran | | 93 | 2 | 0 | 0 | 0 | 0 | 93 | 2 |
| Career total | | | 93 | 0 | 2 | 0 | 0 | 0 | 93 | 2 |

- Assist Goals

| Season | Team | Assists |
|---|---|---|
| 2010–11 | Sanat Naft Abadan F.C. | 0 |
