= Saeid Mozaffarizadeh =

Iranian football referee

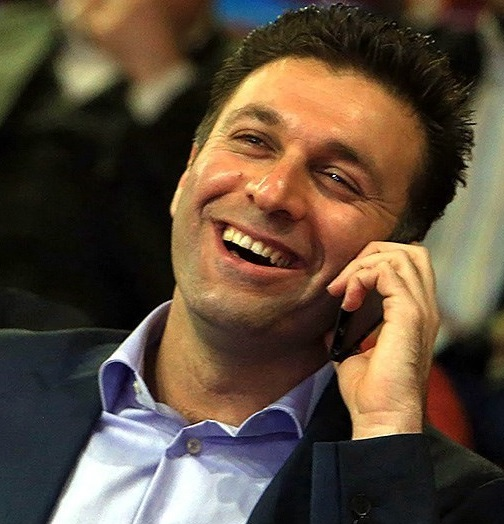
- Mozaffarizadeh in 2014
- Full name: Saeid Mozaffarizadeh Yazdi سعید مظفری‌زاده یزدی
- Born: October 15, 1974 (age 52); Yazd, Iran
- Other occupation: Civil engineer

Domestic
Years	League	Role
2006–2014	Iran Pro League	Referee

International
Years	League	Role
2007–2014	FIFA listed	Referee

Saeid Mozaffarizadeh (Persian: سعید مظفری‌زاده, born October 15, 1974) is an Iranian football referee who refereed in Iran Pro League and has been on the international list from 2007 to 2014. He is the current manager of Tractor S.C. in Persian Gulf Pro League.

The 2006/07 season was Mozaffarizadeh's first year refereeing in Iran's top division and it was one of the greatest years a rookie referee could have. Mozafarizadeh called 18 matches in which he gave away 71 cards and called 4 penalties. Out of all of his 18 matches the game of week 6 between Persepolis and Saipa was his worst game of the season but overall Saeid Mozaffarizadeh had so much talent that he was named Referee of the 2006/07 IPL season by the Football Iran News & Events which was given this referee award for the first time.

During the 2007/08 season Mozaffarizadeh refereed 18 matches again but this time he gave a record setting 84 cards and he called only 2 penalties. Mozaffarizadeh did so well that they named him the referee for the Persepolis vs Sepahan match in the last week which proved who the champion of the league was. He was also the referee for the Hazfi Cup Final played between Pegah and Esteghlal. At the end of the season Mozaffarizadeh was once again named the referee of the season by Football Iran News & Events but he also won the same award by the Iran Football Federation Award which was being given for the first time.

During the 2008/09 season Mozaffarizadeh officiated twice in the 2009 AFC Cup and he also refereed 17 matches in the league in which he gave 83 cards and called 9 penalties. He was once again the referee for the Hazfi Cup Final played between Zob Ahan and Rah Ahan.

During the 2009/10 season he was selected as the referee for Iran's and Asia's biggest Derby played between Persepolis and Esteghlal thus making him the second Iranian referee to officiate this game in nearly 15 years. He also started reffing in the 2010 AFC Champions League. The first match he officiated was between Kawasaki Frontale and Beijing Guoan. On 15 January 2014, Mozaffarizadeh announced that he will be retired as a football referee after he reffing in Tehran derby match between Persepolis and Esteghlal, that was held on 17 January 2014.

== Honours and accomplishments ==
- Football Iran News & Events
  - Referee of the year (2006–07)
  - Referee of the year (2007–08)
  - Referee of the year (2012–13)
- Iran Football Federation Award
  - Referee of the year (2012–13)
