= Kianoush Rahmati =

Iranian footballer and manager

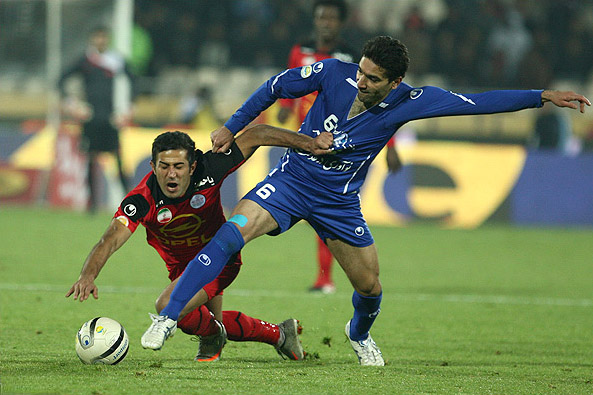

Personal information
- Full name: Kianoush Rahmati
- Date of birth: 18 September 1978 (age 48)
- Place of birth: Noshahr, Iran
- Height: 1.80 m (5 ft 11 in)
- Position: Defensive midfielder

Senior career*
Years	Team	Apps	(Gls)
2000–2004	Shamoushak		
2004–2007	Pas	54	(7)
2007–2009	Saipa	48	(7)
2009–2013	Esteghlal	87	(1)
2013–2014	Saipa	6	(0)
2014	Mes Kerman (loan)	5	(0)

International career
2006–2009	Iran	15	(3)

Managerial career
- 2016: Saipa (assistant)
- 2016–2018: Saipa B
- 2018: Nassaji Mazandaran (assistant)
- 2020–2021: Saipa (assistant)
- 2023–: Esteghlal (assistant)
- * Club domestic league appearances and goals as of 7 December 2013

Kianoush "Kia" Rahmati (Persian: كیانوش رحمتی, born September 18, 1978, in Iran) is an Iranian football manager, former professional footballer.

== Club career ==
He started his appearance in IPL in 2005 and moved to Saipa from Pas in 2007. He moved to Esteghlal in July 2009. He returned to Saipa in summer 2013. He later was loaned out to Mes Kerman and in June 2014 at the age of 35 he declared his retirement after suffering from a series of injuries.

=== Club career statistics ===
Last Update 7 December 2013

Club performance			League		Cup		Continental		Total	
Season	Club	League	Apps	Goals	Apps	Goals	Apps	Goals	Apps	Goals
Iran			League		Hazfi Cup		Asia		Total	
2003–04	Shamoushak	Pro League					-	-		
2004–05	Pas	Pro League	0	0	0	0	-	-	0	0
2005–06	Pas	Pro League	27	6	0	0	-	-	27	6
2006–07	Pas	Pro League	27	1	1	0	-	-	28	1
2007–08	Saipa	Pro League	19	2	1	0	7	3	27	5
2008–09	Saipa	Pro League	29	5	1	0	-	-	30	5
2009–10	Esteghlal	Pro League	22	1	2	0	5	0	29	1
2010–11	Esteghlal	Pro League	26	0	3	0	5	0	34	0
2011–12	Esteghlal	Pro League	19	0	2	0	2	0	22	0
2012–13	Esteghlal	Pro League	1	0	0	0	1	0	2	0
2013–14	Saipa	Pro League	6	0	0	0	–	–	6	0
Career total			164	15	10	0	19	3	193	18

- Assist Goals

Season	Team	Assists
05–06	Pas	1
06–07	Pas	3
07–08	Saipa	0
08–09	Saipa	0
09–10	Esteghlal	1
10–11	Esteghlal	1
11–12	Esteghlal	0
12–13	Esteghlal	0

== International career ==
In October 2006, he was called up to join Team Melli in an LG cup tournament held in Jordan. He made his debut for Iran on October 4 in a match against Iraq. Rahmati scored his first international goal against Palestine on August 7, 2008, in the 2008 West Asian Football Federation Championship.

=== International goals ===
Scores and results list Iran's goal tally first.

#	Date	Venue	Opponent	Score	Result	Competition
1	7 August 2008	Takhti Stadium, Tehran	Palestine	1–0	3–0	2008 West Asian Football Federation Championship
2	13 August 2008	Takhti Stadium, Tehran	Syria	1–0	2–0	2008 West Asian Football Federation Championship
3	15 August 2008	Azadi Stadium, Tehran	Jordan	2–1	2–1	2008 West Asian Football Federation Championship

== Honours ==
=== Club ===
- Iran Pro League
  - Winner: 1
    - 2012–13 with Esteghlal
  - Runner up: 2
    - 2005–06 with Pas
    - 2010–11 with Esteghlal
- Hazfi Cup
  - Winner: 1
    - 2011–12 with Esteghlal
  - Runner up: 1
    - 2013–14 with Mes Kerman
