= Pejman Montazeri =

Iranian footballer (born 1983)

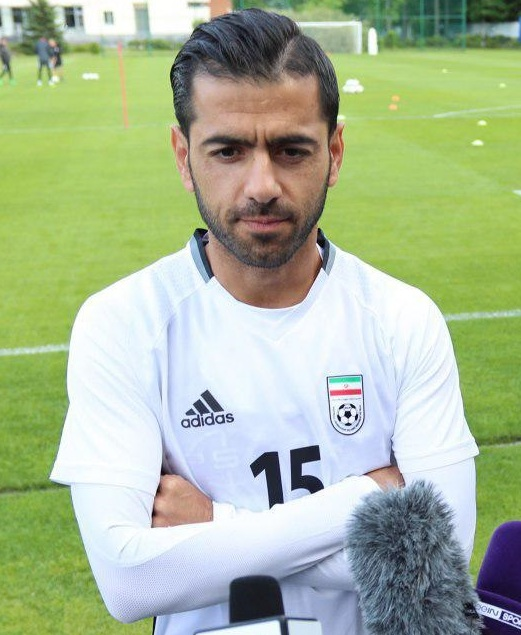
- Montazeri with Iran in 2018

Personal information
- Full name: Pejman Montazeri
- Date of birth: 6 September 1983 (age 43)
- Place of birth: Ahvaz, Iran
- Height: 1.85 m (6 ft 1 in)
- Position: Defender

Youth career
- 2001–2004: Foolad

Senior career*
Years	Team	Apps	(Gls)
2004–2007	Foolad	81	(6)
2007–2014	Esteghlal	209	(10)
2014–2015	Umm-Salal	39	(2)
2015–2017	Al-Ahli	31	(1)
2017–2019	Esteghlal	40	(2)
2019–2023	Al Kharaitiyat	21	(0)

International career^{‡}
2005–2006	Iran U23	8	(1)
2007–2019	Iran	51	(2)

Managerial career
- 2026–: Al Shahania (caretaker)
Medal record
Representing Iran
Asian Games
Bronze medal – third place	2006 Qatar	Team
- * Club domestic league appearances and goals as of 6 April 2018 (UTC) ‡ National team caps and goals as of 7 January 2019

Pejman Montazeri (Persian: پژمان منتظری, born 6 September 1983) is an Iranian former professional footballer and current coach, who played as a defender.

== Club career ==
=== Foolad ===
He was part of the Foolad squad that won the Iran Pro League in 2005, Montazeri played for Foolad in the 2006 AFC Champions League group stage.

=== Esteghlal ===
After Foolad was relegated to the Azadegan League, Montazeri signed with Esteghlal. He had been a regular player for the team in his first two seasons, where he won the Iran Pro League and the Hazfi Cup. He extended his contract with Esteghlal until 2013 where he won the league title in the 2012–13 season. He also reached the semi-final of the Asian Champions League with Esteghlal in 2013.

=== Umm Salal ===
Montazeri transferred to Umm Salal on 5 January 2014. When Montazeri joined Umm Salal, the club was in danger of relegation, but under the leadership of Montazeri, Umm Salal avoided relegation and finished 7th place.

=== Al Ahli ===
On 31 May 2015 Montazeri signed a two-year contract with Qatari club Al Ahli.

=== Return to Esteghlal ===
On 14 June 2017, Montazeri returned to Esteghlal after a mutual decision not to renew his contract with Al Ahli. He was given the number 33 shirt, the same number he wore for Esteghlal during his first spell.

== International career ==
Pejman Montazeri was a member of Iran U-23, participating in the 2006 Asian Games. On 5 October 2011, he made his debut for the senior side against Palestine, where he scored as Iran beat their opponent 7–0. He was named Man of the Match. He was called to the national team for World Cup 2014 qualification, 2015 AFC Asian Cup qualification and 2012 WAFF Championship by coach Carlos Queiroz. On 1 June 2014, he was called into Iran's 2014 FIFA World Cup squad by Carlos Queiroz. He played full 90 minutes in all three matches for Team Melli, where Iran eliminated in the group stage. However, he missed 2015 AFC Asian Cup due to injury. He was also called up to play in the 2018 FIFA World Cup qualification and made a strong partnership with Morteza Pouraliganji and Jalal Hosseini as Iran qualified for the 2018 FIFA World Cup without conceding a goal. In May 2018 he was named in Iran's preliminary squad for the 2018 FIFA World Cup in Russia.

== Career statistics ==
=== Club ===
As of 6 February 2015

Club performance			League		Cup		Continental		Total	
Season	Club	League	Apps	Goals	Apps	Goals	Apps	Goals	Apps	Goals
Iran			League		Hazfi Cup		Asia		Total	
2004–05	Foolad	Pro League	29	2			–	–	29	2
2005–06	Foolad	Pro League	28	1			6	1	34	2
2006–07	Foolad	Pro League	24	2	2	0	–	–	26	2
2007–08	Esteghlal	Pro League	31	2	6	1	–	–	37	3
2008–09	Esteghlal	Pro League	28	0	2	0	4	0	34	0
2009–10	Esteghlal	Pro League	32	2	2	0	7	1	41	3
2010–11	Esteghlal	Pro League	32	2	3	1	6	0	41	3
2011–12	Esteghlal	Pro League	28	2	4	0	7	0	39	2
2012–13	Esteghlal	Pro League	29	1	3	1	8	1	40	3
2013–14	Esteghlal	Pro League	19	1	1	0	4	0	24	1
Qatar			League		Emir Cup		Asia		Total	
2014-15	Umm-Salal	Stars League	14	0	1	0	–	–	15	0
2015-16	Umm-Salal	Stars League	25	2	0	0	–	–	25	2
2016-17	Al Ahli SC	Stars League	18	2	0	0	–	–	18	2
Iran			League		Hazfi Cup		Asia		Total	
2017–18	Esteghlal	Pro League	15	0	3	1	7	0	25	1
2018–19	Esteghlal	Pro League	13	0	1	0	3	1	16	1
Total	Iran		308	15	26	4	52	3	386	21
Total	Qatar		57	4	1	0	–	–	58	3
Career total			359	18	25	3	43	3	428	24

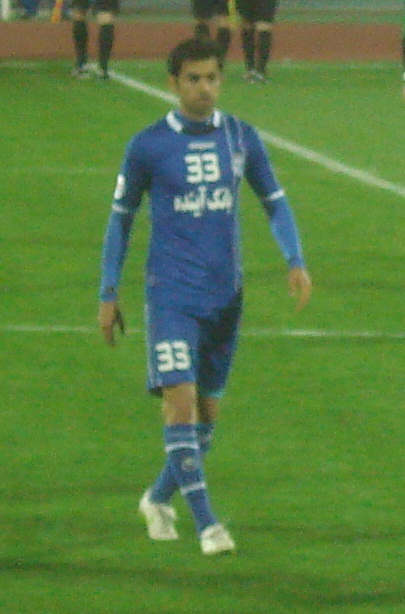
Montazeri playing for Esteghlal in AFC Champions League in 2013

=== International ===
Statistics accurate as of match played 31 December 2018.

Iran
Year	Apps	Goals
2008	1	0
2011	1	1
2012	9	0
2013	7	0
2014	8	0
2015	7	0
2016	6	1
2017	3	0
2018	7	0
2019	2	0
Total	51	2

=== International goals ===
Scores and results list Iran's goal tally first.

#	Date	Venue	Opponent	Score	Result	Competition
1	5 October 2011	Azadi Stadium, Tehran	Palestine	5–0	7–0	Friendly

== Honours ==
=== Club ===
Foolad

- Iran Pro League: 2004–05

Esteghlal

- Iran Pro League: 2008–09, 2012–13
- Hazfi Cup: 2007–08, 2011–12, 2017–18

=== Individual ===
- Iran Football Federation Award player of the season: 2012–13 (Third)
