= Daniel Olerum =

Nigerian footballer (born 1983)

Daniel "Erfan" Olerum
Personal information
- Full name: Daniel Okechukwu Olerum
- Date of birth: 13 March 1983 (age 43)
- Place of birth: Lagos, Nigeria
- Height: 1.84 m (6 ft 0 in)
- Position: Forward

Team information
- Current team: Shabab Al-Ordon

Youth career
- University of Nigeria

Senior career*
Years	Team	Apps	(Gls)
2002–2003	Enugu Rangers		
2003–2004	Shooting Stars		
2004–2005	Pasargad	31	(28)
2005–2006	Foolad	11	(0)
2006–2009	Aboomoslem	90	(26)
2009–2011	Tractor Sazi	20	(0)
2011	Gostaresh	11	(4)
2011–2012	Aboomoslem	20	(2)
2013	Sloboda Užice	6	(0)
2013–2014	Al-Wehdat	7	(0)
2014–2015	Shabab Al-Ordon	10	(1)
- * Club domestic league appearances and goals as of 17 October 2016

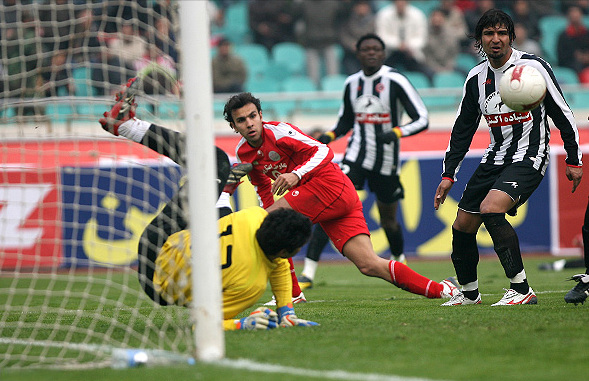
Olerum during his time at F.C. Aboomoslem

Daniel "Erfan" Okechukwu Olerum (born 13 March 1983) is a Nigerian footballer who plays as a forward for Shabab Al-Ordon Club in the Jordan Premier League.

== Career ==
Olerum was born in Lagos, Nigeria. He started playing first with Enugu Rangers and then with Shooting Stars SC.

In August 2004, Olerum signed with Foolad F.C. After making only 11 appearances and scoring no goals for Foolad FC in the IPL 2005/06 season, he decided to go to F.C. Aboomoslem, another Premier League side where he would go on to enjoy great success. He has won the best IPL 2006/07 forward award after having scored 17 goals for Aboomoslem. In the next two seasons with Aboomoslem he scored 9 goals and could not perform as well as before. He moved to Teraktor Sazi in 2009 and had unsuccessful seasons with Traktor Sazi where he didn't score a goal. In the middle of the 2010–2011 season, he moved to Gostaresh Foolad in Azadegan League.

On 23 July 2011, he joined Aboomoslem.

In 2013, he joined Serbian SuperLiga side FK Sloboda Užice.

On 22 July 2013, he joined Al-Wehdat for 70,000 dollars comprehensive provider contract and monthly salaries for one season.

== Career statistics ==
Club performance			League		Cup		Continental		Total	
Season	Club	League	Apps	Goals	Apps	Goals	Apps	Goals	Apps	Goals
Iran			League		Hazfi Cup		Asia		Total	
2004–05	Pasargad	Division 1	31	28	1	2	-	-	32	30
2005–06	Foolad	Pro League	11	0	0	0	0	0	11	0
2006–07	Aboomoslem	Pro League	27	17	1	0	-	-	28	17
2007–08	Aboomoslem	Pro League	33	5	2	0	-	-	35	5
2008–09	Aboomoslem	Pro League	30	4	2	0	-	-	32	4
2009–10	Tractor Sazi	Pro League	18	0	0	0	-	-	18	0
2010–2011	Tractor Sazi	Pro League	2	0	1	0	-	-	3	0
2010–2011	Gostaresh	Division 1	11	4	0	0	-	-	11	4
2011–12	Aboomoslem	Division 1	20	2	0	0	-	-	20	2
Serbia			League		Serbian Cup		Europe		Total	
2012–13	Sloboda Užice	Pro League	6	0	0	0	-	-	6	0
Jordan			League		Jordan FA Cup		Asia		Total	
2013–14	Al-Wehdat	Pro League	7	0	5	2	-	-	12	2
Total	Iran		183	60	7	2	0	0	190	62
Total	Serbia		6	0	0	0	-	-	6	0
Total	Jordan		7	0	5	2	-	-	12	2
Career total			196	60	12	4	0	0	208	64

== Honours ==
Shabab Al-Ordon

- Jordan FA Shield: 2016

Individual

- Iran's Premier Football League:
  - Top Goalscorer (2006/07) 17 goals, Aboomoslem, shared with Mehdi Rajabzadeh
- Football Iran News & Events
  - Striker of the year (2006/07)
  - Foreigner player of the year player (2006/07)
