= Ehsan Pirhadi =

Iranian football striker (born 1991)

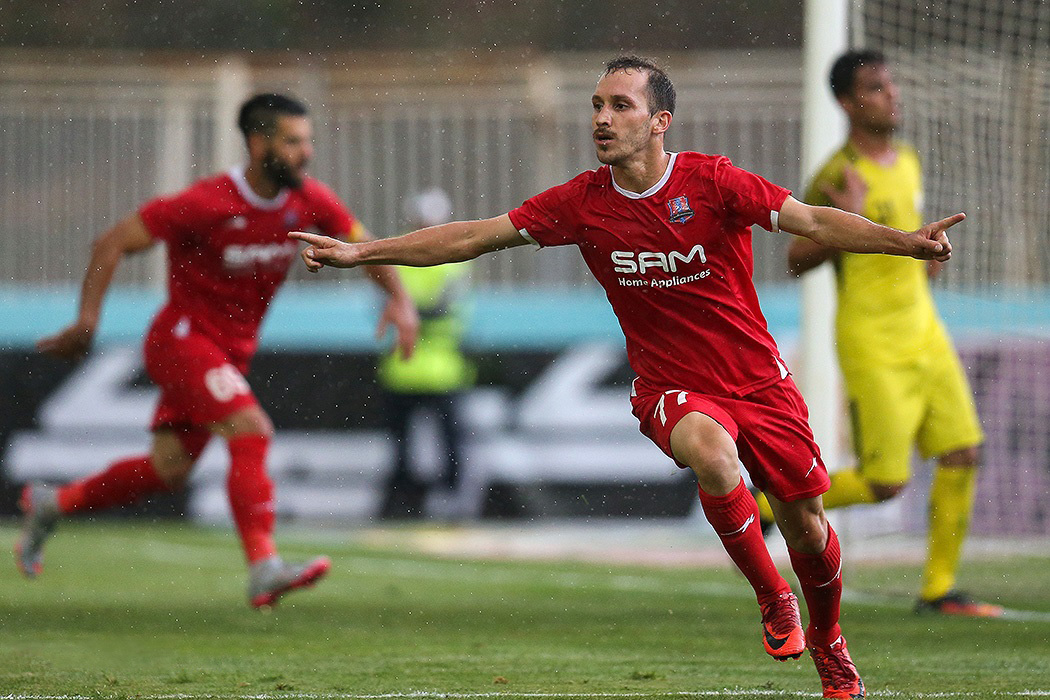

Personal information
- Full name: Ehsan Pirhadi Tavandash Sofla
- Date of birth: May 12, 1991 (age 35)
- Place of birth: Tehran, Iran
- Height: 1.73 m (5 ft 8 in)
- Position: Midfielder

Youth career
- 2006–2010: Esteghlal

Senior career*
Years	Team	Apps	(Gls)
2010–2014	Esteghlal	1	(0)
2012–2014	Esteghlal II	19	(3)
2013–2014	→ Pas Hamedan (loan)	11	(4)
2014–2015	Shahrdari Tabriz	19	(4)
2015–2017	Mes Rafsanjann		
- * Club domestic league appearances and goals as of 5 September 2013

Ehsan Pirhadi (Persian: احسان پیرهادی) is an Iranian football striker, who currently plays for Azadegan League side Shahrdari Tabriz.

== Club career ==
He made his debut during 2010–11 season, played his first match against Mes Kerman.

=== Club career statistics ===
As of 10 May 2013

Club performance			League		Cup		Continental		Total	
Season	Club	League	Apps	Goals	Apps	Goals	Apps	Goals	Apps	Goals
Iran			League		Hazfi Cup		Asia		Total	
2010–11	Esteghlal	Iran Pro League	1	0	0	0	0	0	1	0
2011–12	Esteghlal	Iran Pro League	0	0	0	0	0	0	0	0
2012–13	Esteghlal	Iran Pro League	0	0	1	0	0	0	1	0
2013–14	Esteghlal	Iran Pro League	0	0	0	0	0	0	0	0
2013–14	Pas Hamedan	Azadegan League	0	0	0	0	–	–	0	0
Total	Iran		1	0	1	0	0	0	2	0
Total	Career total		1	0	1	0	0	0	2	0

- Assist Goals

Season	Team	Assists
10–11	Esteghlal	0
11–12	Esteghlal	0
12–13	Esteghlal	0
13–14	Esteghlal	0

== Honours ==
=== Club ===
Esteghlal

- Iran Pro League (1): 2012–13
  - Runner up (1): 2010–11
