= Mohammad Reza Tahmasebi =

Iranian retired Football player (born 1976)

Personal information
- Full name: Mohammad Reza Tahmasebi
- Date of birth: 21 March 1976 (age 50)
- Place of birth: Iran
- Position: Midfielder

Youth career
- Paykan

Senior career*
| Years | Team | Apps | (Gls) |
| 2001–2002 | Paykan | | (3) |
| 2002–2003 | Zob Ahan | | (1) |
| 2003–2004 | Paykan | | (0) |
| 2004–2006 | Saipa | 21 | (1) |
| 2006–2014 | Paykan | 149 | (18) |
| 2010–2011 | Shahrdari Tabriz | 27 | (0) |
| 2011–2014 | Paykan | 54 | (10) |

Managerial career
- 2018–: Paykan (assistant)
- 2018: Paykan (caretaker)
- * Club domestic league appearances and goals as of 7 October 2013 ‡ National team caps and goals as of 17 January 2010

Mohammad Reza Tahmasebi (born 21 March 1976) is an Iranian retired Football player who currently coaches Paykan of the Iran Pro League.

== Club career ==
Since 2006, Tahmasebi has played for Paykan and is currently the captain of his team.

=== Club career statistics ===
Last update 8 October 2014

| Club performance | | | League | | Cup | | Total | |
| Season | Club | League | Apps | Goals | Apps | Goals | Apps | Goals |
| Iran | | | League | | Hazfi Cup | | Total | |
|---|---|---|---|---|---|---|---|---|
| 2004–05 | Saipa | Pro League | 10 | 1 | | | | |
| 2005–06 | Saipa | Pro League | 11 | 0 | | | | |
| 2006–07 | Paykan | Pro League | 26 | 6 | 4 | 0 | 30 | 6 |
| 2007–08 | Paykan | Pro League | 33 | 3 | 2 | 0 | 35 | 3 |
| 2008–09 | Paykan | Pro League | 30 | 6 | 1 | 0 | 31 | 6 |
| 2009–10 | Paykan | Pro League | 33 | 3 | 1 | 0 | 34 | 3 |
| 2010–11 | Shahrdari Tabriz | Pro League | 27 | 0 | 1 | 0 | 28 | 0 |
| 2011–12 | Paykan | 1st Division | 23 | 4 | | | | |
| 2012–13 | Paykan | Pro League | 29 | 6 | | 0 | | |
| 2013–14 | Paykan | 1st Division | 2 | 0 | | 0 | | 0 |
| Total | Iran | | 224 | 29 | | | | |
| Career total | | | 224 | 29 | | | | |

- Assist Goals

| Season | Team | Assists |
|---|---|---|
| 09–10 | Paykan | 4 |
| 10–11 | Shahrdari Tabriz | 2 |
