= Farzad Ashoubi =

Iranian football player and coach (born 1980)

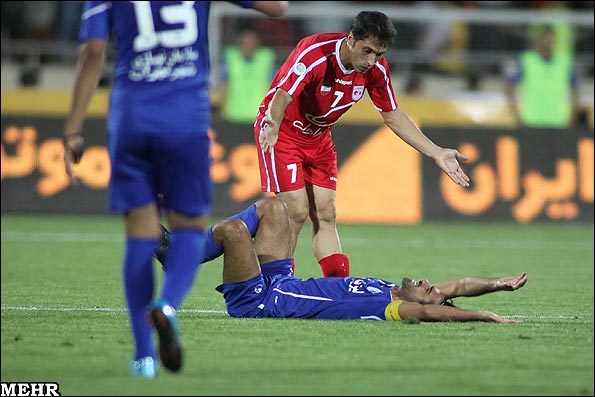

Personal information
- Full name: Gholam-Abbas Ashoubi
- Date of birth: 16 April 1980 (age 46)
- Place of birth: Ray, Iran
- Height: 1.80 m (5 ft 11 in)
- Position: Midfielder

Team information
- Current team: Oghab(Head Coach)

Youth career
- 1996–1997: Malek-e-Ashtar Ray
- 1997–1999: Basij Ray
- 1999–2001: Esteghlal

Senior career*
Years	Team	Apps	(Gls)
2001–2003	Oghab	55	(12)
2003–2004	Dunajská Streda	13	(2)
2004–2006	Oghab	33	(11)
2006–2008	Persepolis	58	(5)
2008–2010	Mes Kerman	51	(9)
2010–2011	Esteghlal	29	(4)
2011–2012	Tractor	23	(1)
2012–2014	Rah Ahan	43	(6)
2014–2015	Shahrdari Tabriz	22	(5)
2015–2016	Esteghlal Ahvaz	13	(3)
2016	Rah Ahan	8	(1)
Total		348	(59)

International career^{‡}
2007–2010	Iran	8	(0)

Managerial career
- 2020: Khooshe Talaei (assistant)
- 2020–2021: Pars Jonoubi (assistant)
- 2021–2022: Gol Reyhan
- 2022: Shahrdari Bam
- 2022–2023: Persepolis U17
- 2023–2024: Persepolis U21
- 2025: Oghab
- * Club domestic league appearances and goals as of 1 August 2013 ‡ National team caps and goals as of 1 October 2010

Gholam-Abbas Ashoubi (Persian: غلامعباس آشوبی, born 16 April 1980), better known as Farzad Ashoubi (Persian: فرزاد آشوبی), is an Iranian former footballer who last played for Rah Ahan in the Persian Gulf Pro League.

== Club career ==
In August 2006, he moved from Azadegan League club Oghab to the Iranian giants, Persepolis. He scored a spectacular goal from Persepolis' half against Saba Battery. By the end of 2007/2008 season he joined to Mes Kerman. He helped the club to promote for AFC Champions League but at the end of the season there was rumours that he might move back to Persepolis and there was reports that his agent signed for him with Persepolis F.C. while he was in Team Melli camp in June 2009 but somedays later he extended his contract with Mes Kerman. Where he stayed for two seasons before joining Esteghlal and Tractor Sazi for a season each and finish the season as runner up. He joined Rah Ahan while Ali Daei was the head coach of them in 2012.

=== Club career statistics ===
Last Update: 13 May 2022

Club performance			League		Cup		Continental		Total	
Season	Club	League	Apps	Goals	Apps	Goals	Apps	Goals	Apps	Goals
Slovakia			League		Slovak Cup		Europe		Total	
2003–04	Dunajská Streda	2. Liga	13	2			-	-		
Iran			League		Hazfi Cup		Asia		Total	
2004–05	Oghab	Division 1			0	0	-	-		
2005–06	Oghab	Division 1			0	0	-	-		
2006–07	Persepolis	Pro League	29	2	4	1	-	-	33	3
2007–08	Persepolis	Pro League	29	3	2	0	-	-	31	3
2008–09	Mes Kerman	Pro League	28	4	0	0	-	-	28	4
2009–10	Mes Kerman	Pro League	23	5	1	0	7	0	31	5
2010–11	Esteghlal	Pro League	29	4	4	0	5	0	38	4
2011–12	Tractor Sazi	Pro League	23	1	0	0	-	-	23	1
2012–13	Rah Ahan	Pro League	28	4	1	0	-	-	29	4
2013–14	Rah Ahan	Pro League	2	1	0	0	-	-	2	1
Total	Iran				12	1	12	0		
Total	Slovakia		13	2			-	-		
Career total							12	0		

- Assists

Season	Team	Assists
06–07	Persepolis	2
07–08	Persepolis	0
08–09	Mes Kerman	2
09–10	Mes Kerman	5
10–11	Esteghlal	0
12–13	Rah Ahan	1
13–14	Rah Ahan	0
14–15	Shahrdari Tabriz	7

== International career ==
Ashoubi was called up to the Iran national team in June 2007 for the West Asian Football Federation Championship 2007. He made his debut for Iran in Iran's first match vs Iraq. He was called back for Team Melli under Afshin Ghotbi.

== Honours ==
=== Club ===
Persepolis

- Iran Pro League: 2007–08
- Hazfi Cup
  - Runner-up: 2006 Hazfi Cup Final

Esteghlal

- Iran Pro League
  - Runner-up: 2010–11

Tractor

- Iran Pro League
  - Runner-up: 2011–12

=== International ===
- WAFF: 2007

=== Individual ===
- Football Iran News & Events
  - Young player of the year (2006–07)
