= Ra'ed Al-Nawateer =

Jordanian footballer

Personal information
- Full name: Ra'ed Abdel-Rahman Fraeh Al-Nawateer
- Date of birth: 5 May 1988 (age 38)
- Place of birth: Ajloun, Jordan
- Height: 1.72 m (5 ft 8 in)
- Position: Winger

Youth career
- 2003–2004: Ebain Ableen
- 2004–2006: Kufranja SC

Senior career*
Years	Team	Apps	(Gls)
2006–2007	Al-Jazeera		
2007–2008	Al-Ahli		
2008–2011	Al-Jazeera		
2011–2012	Al-Faisaly		
2012–2013	Shabab Al-Ordon		
2013–2014	Al-Faisaly		
2014–2015	Al-Jazeera		
2015–2016	Al-Faisaly		
2016–2017	Shabab Al-Ordon		
2017–2018	Al-Hussein		
2018	Al-Ahli		

International career
2006–2007	Jordan U20		
2007–2015	Jordan	38	(5)
- * Club domestic league appearances and goals

Ra'ed Abdel-Rahman Fraeh Al-Nawateer (Arabic: رائد عبد الرحمن فريح النواطير) is a retired Jordanian footballer.

== International goals ==
=== With U-20 ===
#	Date	Venue	Opponent	Score	Result	Competition
1	2007	Amman	Poland	2-2	Draw	U-20 Friendly

=== With Senior ===
#	Date	Venue	Opponent	Score	Result	Competition
1	December 11, 2007	Muscat	Oman	3-0	Win	Friendly
2	December 11, 2007	Muscat	Oman	3-0	Win	Friendly
3	August 11, 2008	Tehran	Oman	3-1	Win	2008 West Asian Football Federation Championship
4	August 11, 2008	Tehran	Oman	3-1	Win	2008 West Asian Football Federation Championship
5	October 26, 2008	Al-Ram, West Bank	Palestine	1-1	Draw	Friendly
