= Mohammad Mohammadi (footballer) =

Iranian footballer

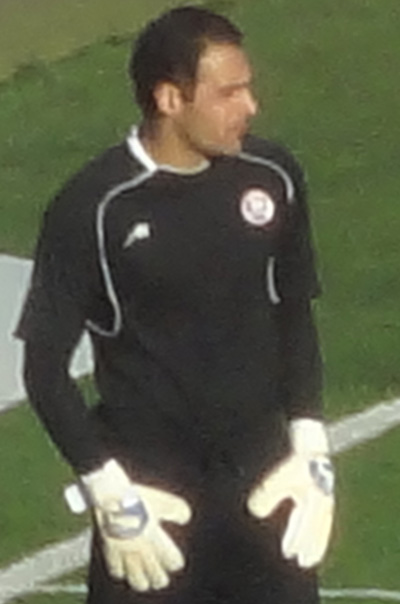
- Mohammadi in 2012

Personal information
- Date of birth: September 20, 1977 (age 49)
- Place of birth: Tehran, Iran
- Height: 1.90 m (6 ft 3 in)
- Position: Goalkeeper

Team information
- Current team: Foolad F.C. (Chairman)

Youth career
- 1990: Pas
- 1991: Saipa
- 1991–1995: Bahman

Senior career*
| Years | Team | Apps | (Gls) |
| 1995–1999 | Saipa | | (0) |
| 1999–2000 | Bargh Shiraz | | (0) |
| 2001–2007 | Persepolis | 44 | (0) |
| 2006–2007 | → Paykan (loan) | 14 | (0) |
| 2007–2008 | Steel Azin | 17 | (0) |
| 2008–2009 | Paykan | 27 | (0) |
| 2009–2011 | Esteghlal | 28 | (0) |
| 2011–2012 | Damash Gilan | 15 | (0) |
| 2012–2013 | Rah Ahan | 17 | (0) |
| 2013–2014 | Orange County Blues | 10 | (0) |

International career^{‡}
| 1999 | Iran U23 | | |
| 2005 | Iran Students | | |
| 2009 | Iran | 1 | (0) |
- * Club domestic league appearances and goals as of June 21, 2013 ‡ National team caps and goals as of March 1, 2009

Mohammad Mohammadi (Persian: محمد محمدی, born September 20, 1977) is a retired Iranian footballer who played as a goalkeeper.

== Club career ==
He became a regular player under Rainer Zobel in Persepolis and moved to Paykan. He moved to First division team Steel Azin in 2007 and returned to Paykan and IPL. He signed for Esteghlal in July 2009.

After starting the most recent season in the IPL as a reserve, he eventually found good form and replaced Vahid Taleblou as Esteghlal's starting goalkeeper, playing in almost all key matches, including the Asian Champions League. In June 2011 he signed with Damash Gilan.

Mohammadi announced his retirement from professional football on June 19, 2014.

=== Club career statistics ===
As of May 10, 2013

| Club performance | | | League | | Cup | | Continental | | Total | |
| Season | Club | League | Apps | Goals | Apps | Goals | Apps | Goals | Apps | Goals |
| Iran | | | League | | Hazfi Cup | | Asia | | Total | |
|---|---|---|---|---|---|---|---|---|---|---|
| 2001–02 | Persepolis | Pro League | 1 | 0 | 0 | 0 | - | - | 1 | 0 |
| 2002–03 | Persepolis | Pro League | 2 | 0 | | 0 | 1 | 0 | | 0 |
| 2003–04 | Persepolis | Pro League | 2 | 0 | | 0 | - | - | | 0 |
| 2004–05 | Persepolis | Pro League | 28 | 0 | | 0 | - | - | | 0 |
| 2005–06 | Persepolis | Pro League | 11 | 0 | 0 | 0 | - | - | 11 | 0 |
| 2006–07 | Paykan | Pro League | 14 | 0 | 4 | 0 | - | - | 18 | 0 |
| 2007–08 | Steel Azin | Division 1 | 17 | 0 | 1 | 0 | - | - | 18 | 0 |
| 2008–09 | Paykan | Pro League | 27 | 0 | 0 | 0 | - | - | 27 | 0 |
| 2009–10 | Esteghlal | Pro League | 13 | 0 | 2 | 0 | 7 | 0 | 22 | 0 |
| 2010–11 | Esteghlal | Pro League | 15 | 0 | 2 | 0 | 4 | 0 | 21 | 0 |
| 2011–12 | Damash | Pro League | 15 | 0 | 1 | 0 | - | - | 16 | 0 |
| 2012–13 | Rah Ahan | Pro League | 17 | 0 | 1 | 0 | - | - | 18 | 0 |
| Career total | | | 162 | 0 | | 0 | 11 | 0 | | 0 |

== International career ==
He has had many short call-ups to the national team but has actually appeared in few national team matches. On November 10, 1999 he was on the bench as Iran played Denmark. In 2005 and before the World Cup he was called up to the national team again but then-coach Branko Ivanković did not invite him again. On November 7, 2008 Ali Daei again called up Mohammadi to the national team. He finally made an appearance in March 2009 against Kuwait as a substitute in the second half.

== Honours ==
=== Club ===
- Iran's Premier Football League
  - Winner: 1
    - 2001–02 with Persepolis
  - Runner up: 1
    - 2010–11 with Esteghlal
