= Reza Mahmoudi =

Iranian footballer

Personal information
- Date of birth: 22 June 1979 (age 47)
- Place of birth: Tehran, Iran
- Position: Midfielder

Senior career*
Years	Team	Apps	(Gls)
2006–2007	Bargh Tehran		
2008–2011	Saipa	28	(0)
- * Club domestic league appearances and goals

Reza Mahmoudi (Persian: رضا محمودی; born 22 June 1979) is an Iranian former footballer.

== Club career ==
Mahmoudi joined Saipa in 2008

=== Club career statistics ===
As of 4 August 2011

Club performance			League		Cup		Continental		Total	
Season	Club	League	Apps	Goals	Apps	Goals	Apps	Goals	Apps	Goals
Iran			League		Hazfi Cup		Asia		Total	
2008–09	Saipa	Pro League	7	0			0	0		
2009–10	Saipa	Pro League	13	0			-	-		
2010–11	Saipa	Pro League	10	0	1	0	-	-	11	0
2011–12	Saipa	Pro League	0	0	0	0	-	-	0	0
Career total			30	0			0	0		

- Assist Goals

Season	Team	Assists
10–11	Saipa	0
11-12	Saipa	0
