= Anderson (footballer, born March 1983) =

Brazilian footballer

Personal information
- Full name: Anderson Ricardo dos Santos
- Date of birth: 22 March 1983 (age 43)
- Place of birth: Marilia, Brazil
- Height: 1.96 m (6 ft 5 in)
- Position: Forward

Youth career
- 2000–2003: Mogi Mirim Esporte Clube

Senior career*
Years	Team	Apps	(Gls)
2003–2005	Mogi Mirim Esporte Clube	20	(11)
2005–2007	Sivasspor	52	(6)
2007–2008	Çaykur Rizespor	22	(4)
2008–2009	Eskişehirspor	24	(8)
2009	FC Seoul	11	(3)
2010	Esteghlal	7	(0)
2012	Botafogo-SP	11	(1)
2012	Tianjin Songjiang	10	(1)
2013	Botafogo-SP		
2013	Votuporanguense	1	(0)
2014	Itapirense	1	(0)
- * Club domestic league appearances and goals

Anderson Ricardo dos Santos (born 22 March 1983), known as just Anderson, is a Brazilian former professional footballer who played as a forward.

== Career ==
In July 2009, Anderson signed a contract with FC Seoul.

He made his K-League debut on 15 August 2009 in FC Seoul's 2–1 win at home to Gyeongnam FC. He scored his first goal for FC Seoul in a 2–0 win over Jeju United on 4 October 2009, and he scored his two consecutive matches goal in a match against Pohang Steelers on 7 October 2009. Anderson scored goal in three consecutive matches in a 2–2 home draw against Busan I'Park on 17 October 2009. He scored three goals in 11 appearances in the 2009 K-League Regular Season and one goal in two appearances in the 2009 K-League Cup.

== Career statistics ==
As of 23 September 2010

Appearances and goals by club, season and competition
Club	Season	League			National cup (Note: Includes Korean FA Cup, Hazfi Cup, Chinese FA Cup.)		League cup (Note: Includes K-League Cup.)		Continental		Total	
Club	Season	Division	Apps	Goals	Apps	Goals	Apps	Goals	Apps	Goals	Apps	Goals
FC Seoul	2009	K-League	11	3	0	0	2	1	2	0	15	4
Esteghlal	2010–11	Persian Gulf Cup	7	0	0	0	–		0	0	7	0
Tianjin Songjiang	2012	China League One										
Career total			18	3	0	0	2	1	2	0	22	4
