= André Luiz (footballer, born 1983) =

Brazilian footballer

Personal information
- Full name: André Luiz de Oliveira Regatieri
- Date of birth: 13 February 1983 (age 43)
- Place of birth: Santo Antônio da Platina-PR, Brazil
- Height: 1.82 m (6 ft 0 in)
- Positions: Right back; winger

Youth career
- 2003: PSTC-PR

Senior career*
Years	Team	Apps	(Gls)
2004	Atlético-PR	3	
2004	Internacional		
2005	Brasiliense		
2005	Atlético-PR		
2006	Espanyol		
2007–2010	Paraná		
2009	→Mogi Mirim (loan)	8	(0)
2010	→Hermann Aichinger (loan)	5	(0)
2010–2011	Esteghlal	16	(0)
2012	J. Malucelli	11	(1)
2012	CS Alagoano	2	(0)
2013	Operário Ferroviário	1	(0)
2013–2014	Marcílio Dias	3	(1)
2014–2015	Cascavel		
2015	Caxias-RS		
2015	Camboriú		
- * Club domestic league appearances and goals

André Luiz de Oliveira Regatieri or simply André Luiz (born 13 February 1983), is a Brazilian former football right back.

== Contract ==
On July 14, 2010, André Luiz de Oliveira Regatieri signed a 2-year contract with the Iranian premier league giants, Esteghlal Tehran after passing the medical tests. He will most probably play as Esteghlal's attacking right midfielder. Other Brazilians playing at the moment for Esteghlal Tehran are : Philipe Alvez (DF/MF) and Anderson Dos Santos (Striker)

=== Club Career Statistics ===
Last update: 20 May 2011

Club performance			League		Cup		Continental		Total	
Season	Club	League	Apps	Goals	Apps	Goals	Apps	Goals	Apps	Goals
Iran			League		Hazfi Cup		Asia		Total	
2010–11	Esteghlal	Persian Gulf Cup	16	0	2	0	1	0	19	0
Total	Iran		16	0	2	0	1	0	19	0
Career total			16	0	2	0	1	0	19	0

- Assist Goals

Season	Team	Assists
10/11	Esteghlal	1

== Honours ==
=== Club ===
- Iran's Premier Football League
  - Runner up: 1
    - 2010/11 with Esteghlal
