= 2008 WAFF Championship =

5th WAFF Championship, held in Iran in 2008

Tournament details
- Host country: Iran
- Dates: 1–15 August
- Teams: 6 (from 1 confederation)
- Venues: 2 (in 1 host city)

Final positions
- Champions: Iran (4th title)
- Runners-up: Jordan

Tournament statistics
- Matches played: 9
- Goals scored: 26 (2.89 per match)
- Top scorer: (Iran) Kianoush Rahmati (3 goals)

The 2008 West Asian Football Federation Championship (Arabic: 2008 بطولة اتحاد غرب آسيا لكرة القدم), was the fifth international association football championship for national teams from West Asia organised by the West Asian Football Federation (WAFF). Hosted by Iran, the competition ran from 7 to 15 August 2008 and was contested by the national teams of Iran, Jordan, Oman, Palestine, Qatar and Syria.

The tournament began with the first matches of the group stage on 7 August 2008 and ended with the final match on 15 August 2008. The final was contested by two-time defending champions Iran and Jordan. Goals from Hadi Aghily and Kianoush Rahmati helped Iran to a 2–1 win as they were crowned champions for the fourth time.

== Background ==
The first edition of the biennial West Asian Football Federation Championship was held in Amman, Jordan in 2000. Iran were two-time defending champions after defeating Syria in the final in 2004 and Iraq in the final of the postponed 2006 edition. They were also the most successful team in the history of the competition after winning the title on three previous occasions.

Iraq were due to take part in the competition but withdrew from the tournament after the team was disbanded for failing to qualify for the 2010 FIFA World Cup.

== Format ==
Six teams took part in the competition. They were drawn into two single round robin groups of three teams. The group winners and runners-up would contest the semi-finals which would decide the teams contesting the final.

=== Participants ===
- Iran
- Jordan
- Oman
- Palestine
- Qatar
- Syria

== Venues ==
Matches were played at the Azadi Stadium and the Takhti Stadium in Tehran.

2008 WAFF Championship is located in Iran	Tehran	
2008 WAFF Championship is located in Iran	Azadi Stadium	Takhti Stadium
2008 WAFF Championship is located in Iran	Capacity: 100,000	Capacity: 30,122

== Group stage ==
=== Group A ===
Iran and Qatar advanced to the semi-finals.

==== Table ====
Team	Pld	W	D	L	GF	GA	GD	Pts	Qualification
Iran	2	2	0	0	9	1	+8	6	Advance to the semi-finals
Qatar	2	1	0	1	2	6	−4	3	Advance to the semi-finals
Palestine	2	0	0	2	0	4	−4	0	

==== Matches ====
7 August 2008

Iran	3–0	Palestine
K. Rahmati 29' (pen.); Rezaei 40'; Rafkhaei 86'

Takhti Stadium, Tehran
Attendance: 5,000
Referee: Ahmad Delo (Syria)

9 August 2008

Palestine	0–1	Qatar
		F. Al Shammari 72'

Takhti Stadium, Tehran

11 August 2008

Qatar	1–6	Iran
Abdullah 52'		Meydavoudi 10', 90'; Alenemeh 33'; Aghily 49' (pen.); Hajsafi 61'; Rafkhaei 80'

Takhti Stadium, Tehran
Attendance: 5,000
Referee: Yousef Shahin (Jordan)

=== Group B ===
Jordan and Syria advanced to the semi-finals.

==== Table ====
Team	Pld	W	D	L	GF	GA	GD	Pts	Qualification
Jordan	2	1	1	0	3	1	+2	4	Advance to the semi-finals
Syria	2	1	1	0	2	1	+1	4	Advance to the semi-finals
Oman	2	0	0	2	2	5	−3	0	

==== Matches ====
7 August 2008

Syria	0–0	Jordan

Takhti Stadium, Tehran

9 August 2008

Oman	1–2	Syria
Saleh 47'		Ibrahim 11'; Abadi 71'

Takhti Stadium, Tehran

11 August 2008

Jordan	3–1	Oman
Abdel-Fattah 6'; Al-Nawateer 71', 84'		Katkoot 26' (pen.)

Takhti Stadium, Tehran

== Semi-finals ==
Iran defeated Syria 2–0 and Jordan defeated Qatar 3–0 to advance to the final.

13 August 2008

Iran	2–0	Syria
K. Rahmati 6' (pen.); Rezaei 52'

Takhti Stadium, Tehran
Attendance: 4,000
Referee: Mohammad Abdollah (Qatar)

13 August 2008

Jordan	3–0	Qatar
Al-Sheikh 45'; Amer Deeb 71'; Al-Saify 90'

Takhti Stadium, Tehran

== Final ==
Iran defeated Jordan 2–1 to win the competition for the fourth time.

15 August 2008

Iran	2–1	Jordan
Aghily 21' (pen.); K. Rahmati 85'		Amer Deeb 82'

Azadi Stadium, Tehran
Attendance: 10,000
Referee: Mohamed Al Zarouni (UAE)
