= 2006–07 Persian Gulf Cup =

6th season of Persian Gulf Pro League

Persian Gulf Cup
- Season: 2006–07
- Champions: Saipa; 1st Pro League title 3rd Iranian title
- Relegated: Foolad; Rah Ahan
- Champions League: Saipa; Sepahan (Hazfi Cup champions)
- Matches: 240
- Goals: 561 (2.34 per match)
- Top goalscorer: Mehdi Rajabzadeh; Daniel Olerum (17 goals)
- Biggest home win: Persepolis 4–0 Est. Ahvaz (28 September 2006); Sepahan 4–0 Est. Ahvaz (4 May 2007)
- Biggest away win: Paykan 0–4 Sepahan (29 March 2007)
- Highest scoring: Zob Ahan 4–3 Rah Ahan (8 January 2007)
- Longest winning run: 5 matches Persepolis
- Longest unbeaten run: 10 matches Persepolis
- Longest winless run: 15 matches Rah Ahan
- Longest losing run: 3 matches Bargh Shiraz
- Highest attendance: 95,000; Persepolis – Esteghlal (3 November 2006); Esteghlal – Persepolis (30 March 2007)
- Lowest attendance: 0 (spectator ban); Esteghlal – PAS Tehran (5 January 2007); Persepolis – Aboumoslem (25 January 2007); Malavan – Foolad (6 April 2007)
- Total attendance: 2,378,000
- Average attendance: 10,119

The 2006–07 Persian Gulf Cup (also known as Iran Pro League) was the 24th season of Iran's Football League and sixth season of Iran Pro League since its establishment in 2001. Esteghlal were the defending champions. The season featured 14 teams from the 2005–06 Iran Pro League and two new teams promoted from the 2005–06 Azadegan League: Mes Kerman as champions and Paykan as runner-up. The league started on 9 September 2006 and ended on 28 May 2007. Saipa won the Pro League title for the first time in their history (total third Iranian title).

== Participating in international competitions ==
2007 AFC Champions League

- Esteghlal
- Sepahan

== Teams ==
Team	Location	Stadium	Capacity
Aboomoslem	Mashhad	Samen Stadium	27,000
Bargh Shiraz	Shiraz	Hafezieh Stadium	50,000
Esteghlal	Tehran	Azadi Stadium	95,225
Esteghlal Ahvaz	Ahvaz	Takhti Ahvaz	10,000
Fajr Sepasi Shiraz	Shiraz	Hafezieh Stadium	50,000
Foolad	Ahvaz	Takhti Ahvaz	30,655
Malavan	Bandar-e Anzali	Sirous Ghayeghran Stadium	15,559
Mes Kerman	Kerman	Shahid Bahonar Stadium	15,000
PAS Tehran	Tehran	Shahid Dastgerdi Stadium	8,250
Paykan	Tehran	Iran Khodro Stadium	10,000
Persepolis	Tehran	Azadi Stadium	95,225
Rah Ahan	Tehran	Rah Ahan-e Ekbatan Stadium	12,000
Saipa	Karaj	Enghelab Stadium	15,000
Saba Battery	Tehran	Shahid Derakhshan Stadium	12,000
Sepahan	Isfahan	Naghsh-e Jahan Stadium	75,000
Zob Ahan Esfahan	Fuladshahr	Foolad Shahr Stadium	20,000

== Final classification ==
Pos	Team	Pld	W	D	L	GF	GA	GD	Pts	Promotion or relegation
1	Saipa (C)	30	15	11	4	45	31	+14	56	Qualification for the AFC Champions League 2008
2	Est. Ahvaz	30	16	6	8	33	28	+5	54	
3	Persepolis	30	14	11	5	49	33	+16	53	
4	Esteghlal	30	14	10	6	39	30	+9	52	
5	Sepahan	30	14	7	9	41	28	+13	49	Qualification for the AFC Champions League 2008
6	Aboomoslem	30	11	10	9	40	36	+4	43	
7	Paykan	30	11	8	11	37	42	−5	41	
8	Zob Ahan	30	10	9	11	39	42	−3	39	
9	Mes Kerman	30	8	12	10	35	39	−4	36	
10	Fajr Sepasi	30	7	13	10	29	32	−3	34	
11	PAS Tehran	30	7	13	10	36	36	0	33 (Note: PAS had one point was subtracted after the team illegally fielded 4 foreign players in the 20th round of the competition.)	Disbanded
12	Bargh	30	8	9	13	35	45	−10	33	
13	Saba Battery	30	7	11	12	28	31	−3	32	
14	Malavan	30	7	11	12	21	30	−9	32	
15	Foolad (R)	30	5	13	12	24	33	−9	28	Relegation play-offs
16	Rah Ahan (R)	30	2	14	14	30	45	−15	20	Relegation play-offs

Updated to match(es) played on May 27, 2007. Source:
Rules for classification: 1) points; 2) goal difference; 3) number of goals scored.
(C) Champions; (R) Relegated

== Results table ==
Home \ Away	SAP	ESA	PRS	EST	SEP	ABU	PAY	ZOB	MES	FJR	PAS	BGH	SAB	MLV	FOL	RAH
Saipa		0–1	2–2	3–1	4–2	2–1	2–1	2–1	2–0	1–0	1–1	1–1	1–1	1–1	2–2	3–1
Est. Ahvaz	2–0		1–0	0–1	2–1	2–1	1–0	1–1	1–1	1–0	3–1	0–0	2–0	0–0	0–0	1–0
Persepolis	2–2	4–0		2–1	2–1	3–4	3–4	3–1	4–1	2–2	1–1	1–0	1–0	1–0	2–1	1–2
Esteghlal	1–2	1–1	1–1		2–1	1–0	0–1	2–1	0–0	3–2	2–1	3–0	1–1	2–1	3–2	1–1
Sepahan	1–0	4–0	0–0	1–0		1–0	2–1	2–0	1–1	1–2	1–0	3–1	3–2	2–0	2–1	1–0
Aboumoslem	1–1	3–4	3–2	1–1	2–0		2–1	4–1	1–1	1–0	3–2	1–0	2–0	3–2	1–0	1–3
Paykan	2–0	3–2	0–2	2–1	0–4	2–2		2–1	4–2	2–2	2–1	1–3	0–0	1–1	0–1	0–0
Zob Ahan	0–2	0–1	2–3	0–0	2–1	1–0	2–2		2–1	1–1	3–2	1–1	1–0	2–0	3–0	4–3
Mes Kerman	2–2	3–1	0–0	0–1	2–1	0–0	1–1	1–1		2–0	0–1	2–1	2–3	1–0	1–1	1–1
Fajr Sepasi	0–1	0–1	1–1	1–1	1–1	2–0	1–0	1–0	0–0		0–2	1–3	1–1	2–0	0–0	2–2
PAS Tehran	1–2	1–0	1–1	1–1	0–0	1–1	3–0	1–1	0–1	1–1		2–2	2–1	1–2	1–0	2–2
Bargh Shiraz	1–2	1–0	1–2	1–2	2–1	1–1	2–1	2–2	1–4	1–1	1–0		0–0	0–1	2–4	3–1
Saba Battery	1–2	1–0	0–1	2–3	0–0	1–1	0–1	1–2	4–1	0–1	0–0	3–0		1–0	0–0	1–1
Malavan	0–0	0–1	0–0	0–1	0–2	0–0	0–0	1–0	2–1	1–0	2–2	2–1	2–3		1–1	2–1
Foolad	1–2	0–1	0–0	0–0	0–0	1–0	0–1	1–1	2–1	0–3	1–1	1–2	0–1	0–0		3–1
Rah Ahan	0–0	1–3	1–2	1–2	1–1	0–0	1–2	1–2	1–2	1–1	1–2	1–1	0–0	0–0	1–1	

Updated to match(es) played on May 27, 2007. Source: http://www.iplstats.com/
Legend: Blue = home team win; Yellow = draw; Red = away team win.

== Player statistics ==
=== Top goalscorers ===
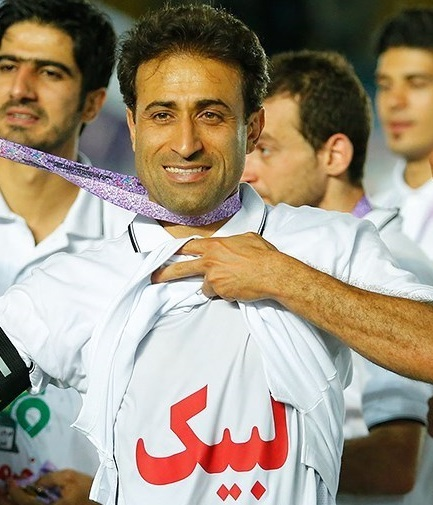
Mehdi Rajabzadeh

Rank	Player	Club	Goals
1	(Nigeria) Daniel Olerum	Aboumoslem	17
1	(Iran) Mehdi Rajabzadeh	Zob Ahan	17
3	(Iran) Abbas Aghaei	Pas	13
3	(Iran) Fereydoon Fazli	Est. Ahvaz	13
5	(Iran) Mohsen Bayatinia	Paykan	11
6	(Iran) Ali Daei	Saipa	10
6	(Iran) Mehrzad Madanchi	Persepolis	10
6	(Iran) Robert Markosi	Bargh Shiraz	10
9	(Iraq) Emad Mohammed	Sepahan	9
10	(Iran) Hadi Asghari	Rah Ahan	8
10	(Iran) Mohsen Khalili	Saipa	8
10	(Iran) Alireza Vahedi Nikbakht	Persepolis	8

=== Cards ===
Player	Yellow card	Yellow card Red card	Red card	Team
(Iran) Sohrab Bakhtiarizadeh	9	1	2	Saba Battery
(Iran) Mohammad Matouri	12	0	0	Bargh Shiraz
(Iran) Saber Mirghorbani	10	0	0	Mes Kerman
(Iran) Ahmad Momenzadeh	10	0	0	Saipa
(Iran) Alireza Vahedi Nikbakht	9	1	0	Persepolis
(Iran) Reza Niknazar	9	1	0	Malavan
(Iran) Majid Noormohammadi	8	0	1	Aboomoslem
(Iran) Mohsen Bayat	9	0	0	Saba Battery
(Iran) Gholamreza Rezaei	9	0	0	Fajr Sepasi
(Iran) Maziar Zare	9	0	0	Malavan

=== Matches played ===
30

- (Iran) Morteza Asadi (Saba Battery)
- (Iran) Ali Yahyanejad (Rah Ahan)

== Attendance ==
=== Average home attendance ===
Pos	Team	Total	High	Low	Average	Change
1	Esteghlal	490,000	95,000	0	35,000	+4.6%
2	Persepolis	472,000	95,000	0	33,714	+11.1%
3	Malavan	151,000	15,000	0	10,786	+40.2%
4	Saipa	160,000	60,000	1,000	10,667	+128.6%
5	Aboumoslem	143,000	35,000	2,000	9,533	+29.6%
6	PAS Tehran	119,000	85,000	1,000	7,933	+105.1%
7	Mes Kerman	90,000	15,000	5,000	6,923	n/a
8	Foolad	101,000	20,000	1,000	6,733	+1.0%
9	Paykan	95,000	50,000	1,000	6,333	+78.8%
10	Est. Ahvaz	94,000	15,000	1,000	6,267	+10.6%
11	Sepahan	91,000	30,000	1,000	6,067	+17.4%
12	Fajr Sepasi	85,000	20,000	1,000	5,667	+4.9%
13	Bargh Shiraz	83,500	20,000	1,000	5,567	+13.6%
14	Saba Battery	81,000	30,000	1,000	5,400	−6.9%
15	Zob Ahan	61,500	15,000	1,000	4,100	−19.1%
16	Rah Ahan	61,100	25,000	100	4,073	+12.1%
	League total	2,378,000	95,000	0	10,119	+10.2%

Updated to games played on 28 May 2007
Source: iplstats.com
Notes:
Matches with spectator bans are not included in average attendances
Mes Kerman and Paykan played last season in Azadegan League

=== Highest attendance ===
Rank	Home team	Score	Away team	Attendance	Date	Week	Stadium
1	Persepolis	2–1	Esteghlal	95,000	3 November 2006	8	Azadi
1	Esteghlal	0–0	Persepolis	95,000	30 March 2007	23	Azadi
2	PAS Tehran	1–1	Persepolis	85,000	27 October 2006	7	Azadi
2	Esteghlal	1–1	Esteghlal Ahvaz	85,000	27 April 2007	27	Azadi
5	Esteghlal	1–2	Saipa	65,000	20 May 2007	29	Azadi
6	Saipa	2–2	Persepolis	60,000	2 March 2007	21	Azadi
7	Persepolis	2–2	Saipa	55,000	17 October 2006	6	Azadi
7	Persepolis	1–1	PAS Tehran	55,000	17 March 2007	22	Azadi
9	Paykan	0–2	Persepolis	50,000	2 October 2006	5	Azadi
9	Persepolis	2–1	Sepahan	50,000	9 February 2007	18	Azadi

Notes:
Updated to games played on 28 May 2007. Source: iplstats.com
