= 2010–11 Persepolis F.C. season =

Persepolis
2010–11 season
- Chairman: Habib Kashani
- Manager: Ali Daei
- Persian Gulf Cup: 4th
- Hazfi Cup: Winners
- AFC Champions League: Group stage
- Top goalscorer: League: Mohammad Nouri (9); All: Mohammad Nouri (13)
- Highest home attendance: 45,000 v Tractor Sazi (27 July 2010) v Naft Tehran (5 November 2010)
- Lowest home attendance: 1,000 v Naft Mahmoudabad (20 October 2010)
- Average home league attendance: 23,500
Home colours	Away colours	Third colours

The 2010–11 season was Persepolis's 10th season in the Persian Gulf Cup, and their 28th consecutive season in the top division of Iranian football. They also competed in the Hazfi Cup and AFC Champions League.

== Competitions ==
=== Overall ===
Competition	Started round	Current position / round	Final position / round	First match	Last match
2010–11 Persian Gulf Cup	—	—	4th	27 July 2010	20 May 2011
2011 AFC Champions League	Group stage	—	Group stage	2 March 2011	10 May 2011
2010–11 Hazfi Cup	Round of 32	—	Winner	20 October 2010	10 June 2011

Updated to match played 10 Jun 2011
Source: Competitions

== Squad ==
=== Iran Pro League Squad ===
Note: Flags indicate national team as defined under FIFA eligibility rules; some limited exceptions apply. Players may hold more than one non-FIFA nationality.

No.	Pos.	Nation	Player
1	GK	IRI	Alireza Haghighi (3rd captain)
2	DF	IRI	Alireza Mohammad
3	DF	IRI	Sepehr Heidari (captain)
4	DF	IRI	Mojtaba Shiri
5	DF	MLI	Sékou Berthé
7	MF	IRI	Mohammad Parvin
8	FW	GER	Shpejtim Arifi
9	MF	IRI	Maziar Zare
10	FW	IRI	Gholamreza Rezaei
11	MF	IRI	Hossein Badamaki
13	DF	IRI	Sheys Rezaei
14	MF	IRI	Mohammad Nouri
15	MF	IRI	Saman Aghazamani
16	MF	IRI	Mohammad Mansouri
17	DF	IRI	Jalal Akbari
18	DF	IRI	Ebrahim Shakouri
19	MF	IRI	Siavash Tizro

No.	Pos.	Nation	Player
20	DF	IRI	Alireza Nourmohammadi
21	FW	IRI	Vahid Hashemian (vice-captain)
22	MF	IRI	Mohammad Mehdi Elhaei
23	MF	IRI	Amir Hossein Feshangchi
24	FW	IRI	Hadi Norouzi
25	MF	IRI	Mehdi Shiri
26	MF	IRI	Hamidreza Aliasgari
27	MF	BRA	Tiago Alves Fraga
28	GK	IRI	Masoud Dastani
29	MF	IRI	Kamran Tajari
30	FW	IRI	Mojtaba Zarei
31	GK	IRI	Benyamin Mahmoudian
33	FW	BFA	Hervé Oussalé
34	FW	IRI	Rouhollah Seifollahi
36	GK	IRI	Rahman Ahmadi
37	DF	IRI	Ali Ebrahimi
40	FW	IRI	Saeed Hallafi

==== Retirement ====
6    MF   Karim Bagheri retired from football during the season.

== Persian Gulf Cup ==
=== Matches ===
Date Round	Home	Score	Away	Location

27 July 2010 1	Persepolis	1 – 0	Tractor	Tehran
	Gh. Rezaei 46'	1-0		Stadium: Azadi Stadium; Attendance: 45,000; Referee: Masoud Moradi

1 August 2010 2	Saba	2 – 1	Persepolis	Tehran
	S. Bakhtiarizadeh 12'; M. Bayatinia 31'	2-1	M. Nouri 29'	Stadium: Yadegar-e Emam Stadium; Attendance: 10,000; Referee: Mohsen Torky

6 August 2010 3	Persepolis	2 – 1	Saipa	Tehran
	A. Feshangchi 14'; Gh. Rezaei 47'	2-1	A. Manouchehri 64'	Stadium: Azadi Stadium; Attendance: NA; Referee: Hedayat Mombeini

15 August 2010 4	Sanat Naft	0 – 1	Persepolis	Abadan
	H. Shahriari (red card) 90'	0-1	Gh. Rezaei 37'	Stadium: Takhti Stadium; Attendance: NA; Referee: Saeid Mozaffari Zadeh

19 August 2010 5	Rah Ahan	2 – 3	Persepolis	Tehran
	Rodriguinho 55'; H. Hedayati 66'	2-3	A. Feshangchi 40'; M. Nouri 48', 61'	Stadium: Azadi Stadium; Attendance: 40,000; Referee: Khodadad Afsharian

23 August 2010 6	Persepolis	2 – 1	Shahin Bushehr	Tehran
	Gh. Rezaei 1'; M. Zare 61'; A. Feshangchi (red card) 62'	2-1	M. Nouri 82'	Stadium: Azadi Stadium; Attendance: 30,000; Referee: Alireza Faghani

28 August 2010 7	Foolad	1 – 1	Persepolis	Ahvaz
	O. Khouraj 45+4'		M. Nouri 36'	Stadium: Takhti Stadium; Attendance: 12,000; Referee: Mohsen Ghahremani

11 September 2010 8	Persepolis	1 – 1	Pas	Tehran
	M. Nouri 15'	1-1	M. Aghamohammadi 90+2'	Stadium: Azadi Stadium; Attendance: 30,000; Referee: Shahin Hajbabaei

18 September 2010 9	Shahrdari Tabriz	1 – 1	Persepolis	Tabriz
	Sh. Goudarzi 90+7'	1-1	M. Mansouri 81'	Stadium: Takhti Stadium; Attendance: 10,000; Referee: Saeed Bakhshizadeh

10 October 2010 10	Persepolis	2 – 3	Malavan	Tehran
	Gh. Rezaei 3'; M. Zare 48'	2-3	M. Rostami 10'; M. Oladi 17'; P. Nouri 87'	Stadium: Azadi Stadium; Attendance: 10,000; Referee: Khodadad Afsharian

15 October 2010 11	Esteghlal	1 – 0	Persepolis	Tehran
	F. Majidi 90+1'	1-0		Stadium: Azadi Stadium; Attendance: 95,000; Referee: Masoud Moradi

25 October 2010 12	Persepolis	2 – 0	Zob Ahan	Tehran
	H. Norouzi 16'; M. Nouri 84'	2-0	M. Ahmadi (red card) 61'	Stadium: Azadi Stadium; Attendance: 20,000; Referee: Saeid Mozaffari Zadeh

30 October 2010 13	Steel Azin	0 – 2	Persepolis	Tehran
		0-2	H. Norouzi 62'; Sh. Arifi 86'	Stadium: Azadi Stadium; Attendance: 35,000; Referee: Mohsen Torky

5 November 2010 14	Persepolis	3 – 1	Naft Tehran	Tehran
	Sh. Arifi 11', 50'; A. Nourmohammadi 81'	3-1	B. Tahmasebi 21' (pen.)	Stadium: Azadi Stadium; Attendance: 45,000; Referee: Mahmoud Rafiei

11 November 2010 15	Mes Kerman	1 – 0	Persepolis	Kerman
	N. Bagheriha 3'	1-0	A. Mohammad (red card) 54'	Stadium: shahid Bahonar Stadium; Attendance: NA; Referee: Hedayat Mombeini

29 November 2010 16	Persepolis	1 – 4	Sepahan	Tehran
	T. Fraga 31'	1-4	I. Touré 41'; H. Aghily 66' (pen.); Kh. Heydari 73'; R. Enayati 86' (pen.)	Stadium: Azadi Stadium; Attendance: 15,000; Referee: Mohsen Ghahremani

4 December 2010 17	Paykan	3 – 0	Persepolis	Qazvin
	A. Abbasfard 15', 27'; J. Asgari 89'	3-0		Stadium: Shahid Rajai Stadium; Attendance: 7,000; Referee: Saeid Mozaffari Zadeh

9 December 2010 18	Tractor	1 – 0	Persepolis	Tabriz
	K. Jassim 27' (pen.), (red card) 64'	1-0		Stadium: Yadegar-e Emam Stadium; Attendance: 60,000; Referee: Khodadad Afsharian

19 December 2010 19	Persepolis	1 – 4	Saba	Tehran
	S. Heydari 90+3'	1-4	F. Hatami 4'; H. Farzaneh 28'; M. Bayat 32'; A. Mirshafieian (red card) 51'; V. Hamdinejad 60'	Stadium: Azadi Stadium; Attendance: 2,000; Referee: Yadollah Jahanbazi

23 December 2010 20	Saipa	0 – 1	Persepolis	Tehran
		0-1	Sh. Arifi 83'	Stadium: Takhti Stadium; Attendance: 15,000; Referee: Alireza Faghani

5 February 2011 21	Persepolis	2 – 0	Sanat Naft	Tehran
	M. zare 45+5'; H. Norouzi 52'	2-0	Sh. Arifi 44'	Stadium: Azadi Stadium; Attendance: 5,000; Referee: Mohsen Torky

13 February 2011 22	Persepolis	0 – 0	Rah Ahan	Tehran
		0-0	H. Roudbarian (red card) 44'	Stadium: Azadi Stadium; Attendance: 10,000; Referee: Mahmoud Rafiei

19 February 2011 23	Shahin Bushehr	1 – 2	Persepolis	Bushehr
	E. Mohammed 16'	1-2	S. Heydari 5'; M. Nouri 65'	Stadium: Shahid Mahdavi Stadium; Attendance: 20,000; Referee: Hedayat Mombeini

25 February 2011 24	Persepolis	3 – 1	Foolad	Tehran
	S. Heydari 61'; H. Norouzi 81'; H. Badamaki 90+2'	3-1	R. Ma'ghouli 90+1'	Stadium: Azadi Stadium; Attendance: 30,000; Referee: Yadollah Jahanbazi

7 March 2011 25	Pas	1 – 2	Persepolis	Hamedan
	H. Kazemi 47'	1-2	M. Nouri 34'; H. Norouzi 38'	Stadium: Qods Stadium; Attendance: 8,000; Referee: Ahmad Salehi

11 March 2011 26	Persepolis	0 – 0	Shahrdari Tabriz	Tehran
		0-0		Stadium: Azadi Stadium; Attendance: 15,000; Referee: Mohsen Ghahremani

20 March 2011 27	Malavan	2 – 1	Persepolis	Anzali
	M. Heidari 25'; P. Nouri 54'	2-1	A. Feshangchi 15'	Stadium: Sirous Ghayeghran Stadium; Attendance: 15,000; Referee: Touraj Haghverdi

30 March 2011 28	Persepolis	0 – 1	Esteghlal	Tehran
		0-1	A. Borhani 43'	Stadium: Azadi Stadium; Attendance: 65,000; Referee: Mohsen Torky

10 April 2011 29	Zob Ahan	0 – 3	Persepolis	Fuladshahr
		0-3	A. Feshangchi 45+5'; V. Hashemian 68'; M. Nouri 71'	Stadium: Fuladshahr Stadium; Attendance: 10,000; Referee: Saeid Mozaffari Zadeh

15 April 2011 30	Persepolis	2 – 1	Steel Azin	Tehran
	M. Zarei 22'; Sh. Arifi 90+5'; A. Nourmohammadi (red card) 90+5'	2-1	S. Akbarpour 36'; M. Mohammadi (red card) 85'; Mateus (red card) 90+5'	Stadium: Azadi Stadium; Attendance: 30,000; Referee: Khodadad Afsharian

24 April 2011 31	Naft Tehran	1 – 5	Persepolis	Tehran
	S. Feizollahi 87'	1-5	H. Aliasgari 18', 60'; H. Badamaki 47'H. Norouzi 84'; T. Fraga 90+4'	Stadium: Azadi Stadium; Attendance: 5,000; Referee: Hedayat Mombeini

28 April 2011 32	Persepolis	0 – 0	Mes Kerman	Tehran
		0-0		Stadium: Azadi Stadium; Attendance: 15,000; Referee: Alireza Faghani

15 May 2011 33	Sepahan	0 – 0	Persepolis	Fuladshahr
		0-0		Stadium: Fuladshahr Stadium; Attendance: 20,000; Referee: Saeid Mozaffari Zadeh

20 May 2011 34	Persepolis	5 – 1	Paykan	Tehran
	H. Norouzi 23'; M. Shiri 62'; H. Badamaki 80', 90+1'; M. Zare 87'	5-1	A. Ghorbani 45'	Stadium: Azadi Stadium; Attendance: 4,000; Referee: Mohsen Ghahremani

==== Score overview ====
Win Draw Loss

Opposition	Home score	Away score	Aggregate score
Esteghlal	0–1	1–0	0–2
Foolad	3–1	1–1	4–2
Malavan	2–3	2–1	3–5
Mes Kerman	0–0	1–0	0–1
Naft Tehran	3–1	1–5	8–2
PAS	1–1	1–2	3–2
Paykan	5–1	3–0	5–4
Rah Ahan	0–0	2–3	3–2
Saba	1–4	2–1	2–6
Saipa	2–1	0–1	3–1
Sanat Naft	2–0	0–1	3–0
Sepahan	1–4	0–0	1–4
Shahin Bushehr	2–1	1–2	4–2
Shahrdari Tabriz	0–0	1–1	1–1
Steel Azin	2–1	0–2	4–1
Tractor	1–0	1–0	1–1
Zob Ahan	2–0	0–3	5–0

=== Results by round ===
Round	1	2	3	4	5	6	7	8	9	10	11	12	13	14	15	16	17	18	19	20	21	22	23	24	25	26	27	28	29	30	31	32	33	34
Ground	H	A	H	A	A	H	A	H	A	H	A	H	A	H	A	H	A	A	H	A	H	H	A	H	A	H	A	H	A	H	A	H	A	H
Result	W	L	W	W	W	W	D	D	D	L	L	W	W	W	L	L	L	L	L	W	W	D	W	W	W	D	L	L	W	W	W	D	D	W
Position	4	7	4	3	2	1	2	2	2	2	4	3	3	2	2	4	5	7	7	6	6	6	6	5	4	5	5	5	5	5	5	4	4	4

Updated to match(es) played on 20 May 2011. Source: "Ipl".
A = Away; H = Home; W = Win; D = Draw; L = Loss

=== Results summary ===
Overall								Home						Away					
Pld	W	D	L	GF	GA	GD	Pts	W	D	L	GF	GA	GD	W	D	L	GF	GA	GD
34	17	7	10	50	36	+14	58	9	4	4	27	19	+8	8	3	6	23	17	+6

	GP	W	D	L	Pts	GF	GA	GD
In Azadi Studium	17	9	4	4	31	27	19	+8
In Other Stadiums	17	8	3	6	27	23	17	+6

Last updated: 20 May 2011.
Source: Ipl Stats

=== League standings ===
Pos	Team	Pld	W	D	L	GF	GA	GD	Pts	Qualification or relegation
2	Esteghlal	34	18	11	5	55	34	+21	65	Qualification for the 2012 AFC Champions League Qualifying play-off
3	Zob Ahan	34	18	9	7	49	31	+18	63	Qualification for the 2012 AFC Champions League Qualifying play-off
4	Persepolis	34	17	7	10	50	36	+14	58	Qualification for 2012 AFC Champions League group stage (Note: Persepolis qualified to AFC Champions League group stage directly by winning the Hazfi Cup)
5	Tractor Sazi	34	15	12	7	42	29	+13	57	
6	Foolad	34	14	12	8	58	36	+22	54	

Updated to match(es) played on 1 SEP 2018. Source: IPL Stats, Soccerway
Rules for classification: 1) Points; 2) Goal difference; 3) Goals scored.

=== Scorers and assistants ===
==== Goalscorers ====
Total	Player		Goals per Round																																	
Total	Player		1	2	3	4	5	6	7	8	9	10	11	12	13	14	15	16	17	18	19	20	21	22	23	24	25	26	27	28	29	30	31	32	33	34
9 Goals	(Iran)	Mohammad Nouri		1			2		1	1				1											1		1				1					
7 Goals	(Iran)	Hadi Norouzi												1	1								1			1	1						1			1
5 Goals	(Iran)	Gholamreza Rezaei	1		1	1		1				1																								
5 Goals	(Germany)	Shpejtim Arifi													1	2						1										1				
4 Goals	(Iran)	Amir Hossein Feshangchi			1		1																						1		1					
4 Goals	(Iran)	Maziar Zare						1				1											1													1
4 Goals	(Iran)	Hossein Badamaki																								1							1			2
3 Goals	(Iran)	Sepehr Heidari																			1				1	1										
2 Goals	(Iran)	Hamidreza Aliasgari																															2			
2 Goals	(Brazil)	Tiago Alves Fraga																1															1			
1 Goal	(Iran)	Mohammad Mansouri									1																									
1 Goal	(Iran)	Alireza Noormohammadi														1																				
1 Goal	(Iran)	Vahid Hashemian																													1					
1 Goal	(Iran)	Mojtaba Zarei																														1				
1 Goal	(Iran)	Mojtaba Shiri																																		1

A goal was scored from a penalty kick
Two goals were scored from penalty kicks

==== Goalassistants ====
Name	Assists
(Iran) Hadi Norouzi	7
(Iran) Gholamreza Rezaei	6
(Iran) Amir Hossein Feshangchi	6
(Iran) Mohammad Nouri	6
(Iran) Hossein Badamaki	4
(Iran) Hamidreza Aliasgari	2
(Iran) Jalal Akbari	1
(Iran) Alireza Mohammad	1
(Iran) Alireza Noormohammadi	1
(Iran) Sepehr Heidari	1
(Iran) Mohammad Mansouri	1
(Iran) Ebrahim Shakouri	1
(Iran) Vahid Hashemian	1
(Germany) Shpejtim Arifi	1

- Assist leader of competition (shared with Ebrahim Sadeghi)

==== Cards ====
Position	Player	Yellow card	Yellow card Red card	Red card	Total
1	(Iran) Hamidreza Aliasgari	7	0	0	7
1	(Iran) Hossein Badamaki	7	0	0	7
1	(Iran) Maziar Zare	7	0	0	7
4	(Iran) Sepehr Heidari	6	0	0	6
5	(Iran) Amir Hossein Feshangchi	4	1	0	5
6	(Iran) Mohammad Nouri	5	0	0	5
7	(Iran) Alireza Noormohammadi	2	0	2	4
8	(Iran) Alireza Mohammad	4	0	0	4
8	(Brazil) Tiago Alves Fraga	4	0	0	4
10	(Iran) Hadi Norouzi	2	1	0	3
11	(Iran) Gholamreza Rezaei	3	0	0	3
11	(Iran) Mehdi Shiri	3	0	0	3
11	(Iran) Ebrahim Shakouri	3	0	0	3
11	(Iran) Saman Aghazamani	3	0	0	3
15	(Iran) Karim Bagheri	1	1	0	2
16	(Iran) Mojtaba Shiri	2	0	0	2
16	(Iran) Saeid Hallafi	2	0	0	2
16	(Iran) Alireza Haghighi	2	0	0	2
19	(Iran) Jalal Akbari	1	0	0	1
19	(Iran) Sheys Rezaei	1	0	0	1
19	(Iran) Mojtaba Zarei	1	0	0	1
19	(Iran) Rahman Ahmadi	1	0	0	1
19	(Iran) Mohammad Mansouri	1	0	0	1
19	(Germany) Shpejtim Arifi	1	0	0	1
19	(Mali) Sékou Berthé	1	0	0	1
Total Cards		73	3	2	78

==== Matches played ====
32 Matches

- (Iran) Maziar Zare

31 Matches

- (Iran) Mohammad Nouri

29 Matches

- (Iran) Hadi Norouzi

== Hazfi Cup ==
=== Matches ===
Last updated 24 May 2010
Win Draw Loss Postponed

Date Round	Home	Score	Away	Location

20 October 2010 R32	Persepolis	5 – 1	Naft Mahmoudabad	Tehran
	Sh. Arifi 45+3'; M. Nouri 46', 55' (pen.); A. Feshangchi 76'; H. Norouzi 82'		K. Mousavi 90+4'	Stadium: Azadi Stadium; Attendance: 1,000; Referee: Mohammadreza Akbarian

21 November 2010 R16	Damash Gilan	1 – 2 (a.e.t.)	Persepolis	Rasht
	A. Adrović 13'; M. Hajati (yellow card) (yellow-red card) 90+2'		S. Heydari 33'; S. Hallafi 105'	Stadium: Sardar Jangal Stadium; Attendance: 20,000; Referee: Touraj Haghverdi

29 May 2011 Quarter-final	Persepolis	0 – 0 (a.e.t.) (4 – 2 p)	Sepahan	Tehran
				Stadium: Azadi Stadium; Attendance: 74,632; Referee: Mohsen Torky
	Penalties
	M. Zare (penalty scored); V. Hashemian (penalty scored); M. Shiri (penalty missed); M. Nouri (penalty scored); H. Aliasgari (penalty scored)		(penalty missed) H. Aghily; (penalty missed) I. Touré; (penalty scored) H. Beikzadeh; (penalty scored) O. Ebrahimi

2 June 2011 Semi-final	Foolad	0 – 1	Persepolis	Ahvaz
	A. Hamoudi (yellow card) (yellow-red card) 23'		V. Hashemian 64'	Stadium: Takhti Stadium; Attendance: 20,000; Referee: Saeid Mozaffari Zadeh

==== Final ====
7 June 2011 first-leg	Persepolis	4 – 2	Malavan	Tehran
17:15	M. Zare (penalty missed) 45+1; A. Nourmohammadi 47'; H. Norouzi 63'; M. Nouri 71', 86' (pen.)		M. Rostami 34', (yellow card) (yellow-red card) 86'; H. Jafari (red card) 37'; M. Nozhati 69'	Stadium: Azadi Stadium; Attendance: 82,300; Referee: Alireza Faghani

10 June 2011 Second-leg	Malavan	1 – 0 (3 – 4 agg.)	Persepolis	Anzali
14:30	M. Oladi 19'			Stadium: Sirous Ghayeghran Stadium; Attendance: 20,000; Referee: Masoud Moradi

=== Scorers in Hazfi Cup ===
==== Goalscorers ====
Total	Player		Goals per Round					
Total	Player		1/16	1/8	1/4	1/2	Final 1	Final 2
4 Goals	(Iran)	Mohammad Nouri	2				2	
2 Goals	(Iran)	Hadi Norouzi	1				1	
1 Goal	(Iran)	Amir Hossein Feshangchi	1					
1 Goal	(Germany)	Shpejtim Arifi	1					
1 Goal	(Iran)	Sepehr Heidari		1				
1 Goal	(Iran)	Saeed Hallafi		1				
1 Goal	(Iran)	Vahid Hashemian				1		
1 Goal	(Iran)	Alireza Noormohammadi					1	

A goal was scored from a penalty kick
Two goals were scored from penalty kicks

==== Goalassistants ====
4 Assists

- (Iran) Mohammad Nouri

2 Assists

- (Iran) Amir Hossein Feshangchi

1 Assist

- (Iran) Hadi Norouzi
- (Iran) Mojtaba Shiri
- (Iran) Ebrahim Shakouri

==== Cards ====
Position	Player	Yellow card	Yellow card Red card	Red card	Total
1	(Iran) Hadi Norouzi	2	0	0	2
1	(Iran) Alireza Mohammad	2	0	0	2
1	(Iran) Hossein Badamaki	2	0	0	2
1	(Iran) Vahid Hashemian	2	0	0	2
5	(Iran) Gholamreza Rezaei	1	0	0	1
5	(Iran) Mojtaba Shiri	1	0	0	1
5	(Iran) Saeed Hallafi	1	0	0	1
5	(Iran) Mohammad Nouri	1	0	0	1
5	(Iran) Maziar Zare	1	0	0	1
5	(Iran) Hamidreza Aliasgari	1	0	0	1
5	(Iran) Saman Aghazamani	1	0	0	1
5	(Iran) Ebrahim Shakouri	1	0	0	1
5	(Iran) Alireza Haghighi	1	0	0	1
5	(Brazil) Tiago Alves Fraga	1	0	0	1
Total Cards		18	0	0	18

== 2011 Champions League ==
=== Group C ===
Pos	Team	Pld	W	D	L	GF	GA	GD	Pts	Qualification	ITT	BUN	WAH	PER
1	(Saudi Arabia) Al-Ittihad Jeddah	6	3	2	1	10	5	+5	11	Advance to knockout stage	—	1–1	0–0	3–1
2	(Uzbekistan) Bunyodkor	6	2	3	1	8	6	+2	9	Advance to knockout stage	0–1	—	3–2	0–0
3	(United Arab Emirates) Al-Wahda	6	1	3	2	6	8	−2	6		0–3	1–1	—	2–0
4	(Iran) Persepolis	6	1	2	3	6	11	−5	5		3–2	1–3	1–1	—

==== Persepolis schedule ACL 2011 ====
2 March 2011 1	Al-Ittihad (Saudi Arabia)	3 – 1	(Iran) Persepolis	Jeddah, Saudi Arabia
20:35 UTC+03:00	A. Ziaya 13', 75'; M. Noor 48' (pen.)	Report	M. Zare 19'; Gh. Rezaei (yellow card) 31'; R. Ahmadi (yellow card) 47'	Stadium: Prince Abdullah Al Faisal Stadium; Attendance: 10,787; Referee: Subkhiddin Mohd Salleh (Malaysia)

16 March 2011 2	Persepolis (Iran)	1 – 1	(United Arab Emirates) Al-Wahda	Tehran, Iran
17:30 UTC+03:30	H. Badmaki 66'; Gh. Rezaei (yellow card) 27'; M. Zare (yellow card) 35'; A. Nourmohammadi (yellow card) 56'	Report	H. Ameen 54'; H. Al Kamali (yellow card) 72'	Stadium: Azadi Stadium; Attendance: 15,000; Referee: Yuichi Nishimura (Japan)

5 April 2011 3	Bunyodkor (Uzbekistan)	0 – 0	(Iran) Persepolis	Tashkent, Uzbekistan
18:00 UTC+05:00	A. Mohammad (yellow card) 56'; H. Aliasgari (yellow card) 90+2'	Report	S. Đorđević (yellow card) 5'; H. Karimov (yellow card) 81'	Stadium: JAR Stadium; Attendance: 7,000; Referee: Abdullah Nawaf (Bahrain)

20 April 2011 4	Persepolis (Iran)	1 – 3	(Uzbekistan) Bunyodkor	Tehran, Iran
17:30 UTC+04:30	Sh. Arifi 87'; M. Zarei (yellow card) 81'; A. Mohammad (red card) 70'	Report	A. Rajabov 60'; H. Karimov 71' (pen.), (yellow card) 39'; V. Karpenko 90+5'; S. Juraev (yellow card) 4'; M. Trifunović (yellow card) 68'	Stadium: Azadi Stadium; Attendance: 31,765; Referee: Abdullah Balideh (Qatar)

3 May 2011 5	Persepolis (Iran)	3 – 2	(Saudi Arabia) Al-Ittihad	Tehran, Iran
17:30 UTC+04:30	H. Aliasgari 14', 69'; Sh. Arifi 16', (yellow card) 87'; M. Zare (yellow card) 39'	Report	M. Al-Rashid 19'; S. Berthé 90+4' (o.g.); O. Al-Muwallad (yellow card) 23'; S. Khariri (yellow card) 87'	Stadium: Azadi Stadium; Attendance: 25,486; Referee: Muhsen Basma (Syria)

10 May 2011 6	Al-Wahda (United Arab Emirates)	2 – 0	(Iran) Persepolis	Abu Dhabi, United Arab Emirates
20:30 UTC+04:00	S. Saleh 17'; M. Al Shehhi 70'; M. Khamees (yellow card) 22'; M. Al Qahtani (yellow card) 90'	Report	H. Norouzi (yellow card) 57'; R. Ahmadi (yellow card) 66'; H. Aliasgari (yellow card) 77'	Stadium: Al Nahyan Stadium; Attendance: 1,900; Referee: Abdullah Al Hilali (Oman)

=== Scorers in Champions League 2011 ===
==== Goalscorers ====
Total	Player		Goals per Round					
Total	Player		1	2	3	4	5	6
2 Goals	(Iran)	Hamidreza Aliasgari					2	
2 Goals	(Germany)	Shpejtim Arifi				1	1	
1 Goals	(Iran)	Maziar Zare	1					
1 Goals	(Iran)	Hossein Badamaki		1				

A goal was scored from a penalty kick
Two goals were scored from penalty kicks

==== Goalassistants ====
1 Assists

- (Iran) Mohammad Nouri
- (Iran) Hamidreza Aliasgari

==== Cards ====
Position	Player	Yellow card	Yellow card Red card	Red card	Total
1	(Iran) Maziar Zare	3	0	0	3
2	(Iran) Gholamreza Rezaei	2	0	0	2
2	(Iran) Rahman Ahmadi	2	0	0	2
2	(Iran) Hamidreza Aliasgari	2	0	0	2
5	(Iran) Alireza Mohammad	0	0	1	1
6	(Iran) Alireza Noormohammadi	1	0	0	1
6	(Iran) Alireza Mohammad	1	0	0	1
6	(Iran) Mojtaba Zarei	1	0	0	1
6	(Iran) Hadi Norouzi	1	0	0	1
6	(Germany) Shpejtim Arifi	1	0	0	1
6	(Iran) Alireza Haghighi			0	
Total Cards		14	0	1	15

== Goalkeeping ==
			League			Hazfi Cup			Asian			Total		
No	N	Name	M	GA	CS	M	GA	CS	M	GA	CS	M	GA	CS
1	(Iran)	Alireza Haghighi	20	21	7	6	5	2	3	5	1	29	31	10
36	(Iran)	Rahman Ahmadi	14	15	4	–	–	–	3	6	0	17	21	4
Total			34	36	11	6	5	2	6	11	1	46	52	14

== Friendly Matches ==
=== Pre Season ===
- 24 June 2010

Ardebil Azad University 1-4 Persepolis
Ardebil Azad University 1-4 Persepolis
Alireza Mohammad
Hadi Norouzi
Saeed Hallafi

- 4 July 2010

(Germany) SuS Kaiserau 1920 e.V. 1-7 Persepolis
Maziar Zare
Hadi Norouzi
Tiago Alves Fraga
Amir Hossein Feshangchi
Gholamreza Rezaei
Mohammad Nouri
Own goal

- 6 July 2010

(Germany) Dortmund XI 1-5 Persepolis
Shpejtim Arifi 35'
Hadi Norouzi 48'
Alireza Noormohammadi 53'
Mohammad Nouri 62', 69'

- 8 July 2010

(Germany) Vfk Weddinghofen 1-11 Persepolis
Shpejtim Arifi 20'
Hossein Badamaki 42'
Gholamreza Rezaei 53', 85'
Mojtaba Zarei (55(P))
Amir Hossein Feshangchi 58'
Mohammad Nouri 67'
Hervé Oussalé 7', 31'

- 15 July 2010

Persepolis 2-0 Persepolis Qaem Shahr
Mohammad Nouri 37'
Maziar Zare (79(P))

- 18 July 2010

Paykan 1-0 Persepolis

- 21 July 2010

Persepolis 5-0 Niroye Zamini
Alireza Mohammad 12'
Tiago Alves Fraga 35', 42'
Karim Bagheri 37'
Mojtaba Zarei 80'

=== During Season ===
Game	Date	Tournament	Round	Ground	Opponent	Score^{1}	Report
1	5 September 2010	Friendly		N	Nassaji Mazandaran	2–0	Report / Report link; Persepolis / Nassaji Mazandaran; Mohammad Mansouri 31'; Saeed Hallafi 38'
2	26 September 2010	Friendly		N	Khadamat va Omran Kish	5–3	Report / Report link; Persepolis / Khadamat va Omran Kish; Karim Bagheri 15'; Alireza Mohammad 40'; Mohammad Mansouri 43'; Mehdi Shiri 60'; Amir Hossein Feshangchi 71'; Saman Aghazamani (red card) 81' / Abdolah Shalovand 41'; Aziz Chanani; Aziz Chanani 78'
3*	6 January 2011	Antalya Cup	Semi-final	N (Turkey)	Eintracht Frankfurt (Germany)	2–4	Report / Report link; Attendance / 200; Persepolis / Eintracht Frankfurt; Mohammad Mansouri 85'; Penalties: Vahid Hashemian (penalty missed); Mojtaba Zarei (penalty missed); Tiago Alves Fraga (penalty scored); Mohammad Mansouri (penalty missed); Vahid Hashemian (yellow card) / Kevin Kraus 3'; Penalties: Martin Fenin (penalty missed); Cenk Tosun (penalty scored); Theofanis Gekas (penalty scored); Marcos Alvarez (penalty scored); Benjamin Köhler (yellow card)
4	8 January 2011	Antalya Cup	3rd place	A (Turkey)	Antalyaspor (Turkey)	0–3	Report / Report link; Persepolis / Antalyaspor; Maziar Zare (yellow card) / Hüseyin Atalay 4'; Deniz Barış 34'; Tita 88'; Hüseyin Atalay (yellow card)
5	20 January 2011	Match World Cup	Group stage	N (United Arab Emirates)	Sparta Prague (Czech Republic)	3–2	Report / Report link; Attendance / 500; Persepolis / Sparta Prague; Maziar Zare (18(P)); Ebrahim Shakouri 53'; Hadi Norouzi 58' / Lukáš Třešňák 48'; Léonard Kweuke 65'; Bondoa Adiaba (yellow card)
6	24 January 2011	Match World Cup	Group stage	N (United Arab Emirates)	Zenit St. Petersburg (Russia)	0–2	Report / Report link; Attendance / 500; Persepolis / Zenit St. Petersburg; Maziar Zare (yellow card) / Aleksandr Kerzhakov 7'; Sergei Semak 79'; Bruno Alves (yellow card); Igor Denisov (yellow card); Alessandro Rosina (yellow card); Roland Gigolayev (yellow card)
7	26 January 2011	Match World Cup	3rd place	N (United Arab Emirates)	Žilina (Slovakia)	1–3	Report / Report link; Attendance / 200; Persepolis / Žilina; Maziar Zare (73(P)); Alireza Haghighi (red card) 34' / Tomáš Majtán 7'; Róbert Pich 11'; Ebrahim Shakouri (22(O.G.)); Ondřej Šourek (yellow card)

Last updated: 26 January 2011
^{1}Persepolis goals come first.
Country's flag depict country of foreign team to that of Persepolis.
Ground: H = Home; A = Away; N = Neutral; HR = Home replacement; AR = Away replacement; GD = Goal difference

*The match against Eintracht finished 1-1, but in penalty shootout Eintracht won 3-1.

== Club ==
=== Kit ===
Supplier: (Germany) Uhlsport
Sponsor(s): Tehran Municipality

Home Kit	Away Kit	Third Kit

Source: "Persepolis FC' current kit". Archived from the original on 2010-01-29.

=== Club managers ===
Position	Name	Nat
Head coach	Ali Daei	(Iran)
Assistant coach	Željko Mijač	(Croatia)
Assistant coach	Hossein Abdi	(Iran)
Analyzer	Masoud Aalipour	(Iran)
Fitness coach	Ali Molaei	(Iran)
Goalkeeping coach	Mohammad Ali Yahyavi	(Iran)
Director	Mahmoud Khordbin	(Iran)
Club Doctor	Dr. Farid Zarineh	(Iran)

=== Club officials ===
Position	Name
President	(Iran) Habib Kashani (temporary)
Director	(Iran) Mahmoud Khordbin
Academy President	(Iran) Fereydoun Moeini
Media Officer & International Committee President	(Iran) Morteza Hosseinzadeh Zarabi
Financial Officer	(Iran) Ali Akbar Ashouri
Juridical Officer	(Iran) Mostafa Shokripour
Cultural Officer	(Iran) Hojat'ol eslam Seyyed Mohammad Kohnegi
Chairman & Spokesman of board of Directors	(Iran) Majid Farrokhzadi

Disciplinarian Committee members
(Iran) Ali Mohadesi

Board of Directions
(Iran) Majid Farrokhzadi
(Iran) Mohammad Hossein Nejadfallah

Munition Team
(Iran) Ghasem Abdolsamadi
(Iran) Asghar Norouzali

=== Captains ===
1. (Iran) Sepehr Heidari
2. (Iran) Vahid Hashemian
3. (Iran) Maziar Zare
4. (Iran) Hossein Badamaki
5. (Iran) Mojtaba Shiri

== Squad changes during 2010–11 season ==
=== In ===
No.	Position	Player	Age	Moving from	League	Transfer Window	Ref
36	GK	(Iran) Rahman Ahmadi	29	(Iran) Sepahan	Iran Pro League	Summer	
20	DF	(Iran) Alireza Noormohammadi	28	(Iran) Rah Ahan	Iran Pro League	Summer	
9	MF	(Iran) Maziar Zare	25	(United Arab Emirates) Al-Sharjah	(United Arab Emirates) UAE Football League	Summer	
14	MF	(Iran) Mohammad Nouri	27	(Iran) Saba Qom	Iran Pro League	Summer	
23	MF	(Iran) Amir Hossein Feshangchi	23	(Iran) Saba Qom	Iran Pro League	Summer	
10	FW	(Iran) Gholamreza Rezaei	25	(Iran) Foolad	Iran Pro League	Summer	
33	FW	(Burkina Faso) Hervé Oussalé	22	(Belgium) RAEC Mons	(Belgium) EXQI League	Summer	
5	DF	(Mali) Sékou Berthé	33	(England) Plymouth Argyle	(England) Football League Championship	Winter	
21	FW	(Iran) Vahid Hashemian	34	(Germany) VfL Bochum	(Germany) Bundesliga	Winter	

=== Out ===
No.	Position	Player	Age	Moving to	League	Transfer Window	Ref
1	GK	(Iran) Misagh Memarzadeh	27	(Iran) Foolad	Iran Pro League	Summer	
33	GK	(Iran) Mohammad Hossein Naeiji	19	(Iran) Etka Gorgan	(Iran) Azadegan League	Summer	
5	DF	(Iran) Nabiollah Bagheriha	30	(Iran) Mes Kerman	Iran Pro League	Summer	
12	DF	(Iran) Ziaeddin Niknafs	23	(Iran) Sanat Naft	Iran Pro League	Summer	
10	MF	(Iran) Maysam Baou	26	(Iran) Shahrdari Tabriz	Iran Pro League	Summer	
21	MF	(Iraq) Hawar Mulla Mohammed Taher Zebari	29	(Iraq) Arbil	(Iraq) Iraqi Premier League	Summer	
40	MF	(Iran) Adel Kolahkaj	25	(Iran) Mes Kerman	Iran Pro League	Summer	
9	FW	(Iran) Mohsen Khalili	29	(Iran) Steel Azin	Iran Pro League	Summer	
19	FW	(Iran) Akbar Saghiri	27	(Iran) Naft Tehran	Iran Pro League	Summer	
28	FW	(Brazil) Wésley Brasilia de Almeida	29	(South Korea) Daejeon Citizen	(South Korea) K-League	Summer	
29	FW	(Iran) Mehran Farziat	23	Released	-	Summer	
33	FW	(Burkina Faso) Hervé Oussalé	22	Released	-	Summer	
13	DF	(Iran) Sheys Rezaei	26	Released	-	Winter	
6	MF	(Iran) Karim Bagheri	36	Retired	-	Winter	
