= 2010 Hazfi Cup final =

- Event: 2009-10 Hazfi Cup
Gostaresh Foolad	Persepolis
1	4

First leg
Gostaresh Foolad	Persepolis
0	1
- Date: May 12, 2010
- Venue: Yadegar-e Emam Stadium, Tabriz
- Referee: Khodadad Afsharian
- Attendance: 50,000

Second leg
Persepolis	Gostaresh Foolad
3	1
- Date: May 24, 2010
- Venue: Azadi Stadium, Tehran
- Referee: Masoud Moradi
- Attendance: 100,000

The 2010 Hazfi Cup final was a two-legged football tie in order to determine the 2009–10 Hazfi Cup champion of Iranian football clubs. Persepolis faced Gostaresh Foolad in this final game. The first leg took place on May 13, 2010 at 16:00 IRDT (UTC+4:30) at Yadegar-e Emam Stadium in Tabriz and the second leg took place on May 24, 2010 at 16:00 local time (UTC+3:30) at Azadi Stadium, Tehran.

== Format ==
The rules for the final were exactly the same as the one for the previous knockout rounds. The tie was contested over two legs with away goals deciding the winner if the two teams were level on goals after the second leg. If the teams could still not be separated at that stage, then extra time would have been played with a penalty shootout (taking place if the teams were still level after that).

== Road to the finals ==
Gostaresh Foolad				Round	Persepolis
Opponent	Result	H/A	Gostaresh Foolad goalscorers	First stage	Opponent	Result	H/A	Persepolis goalscorers
Persepolis K.S.	2–0	H	Rasoul Khatibi, Ahmad Shabani	Second Round
Persepolis Zahedan	1–0	A	Ahad Rostami	Third Round
Opponent	Result	H/A	Gostaresh Foolad goalscorers	Second stage	Opponent	Result	H/A	Persepolis goalscorers
Tractor Sazi	3–2	H	Hamid Divsalar, Mohsen Dalir (2)	1/16 Final	Iranjavan	2–1	A	Karim Bagheri, Hawar Mulla Mohammed
Damash Gilan	1–0	H	Makan Dembélé	1/8 Final	Aluminium Hormozgan	3–1	H	Karim Bagheri (2), Mohsen Khalili
Mes Rafsanjan	4–2	A	Makan Dembélé (2), Rasoul Khatibi, Meisam Armian	Quarter-Final	Petrochimi Tabriz	2–1	A	Mohsen Khalili (2)
Zob Ahan	2–0	H	Silas Feitosa Jose De Souza, Naser Azarkeyvan	Semi-Final	Saba Qom	0–0 (4-3)	H

== Final Summary ==
Team 1	Agg.	Team 2	1st leg	2nd leg
Gostaresh Foolad	1-4	Persepolis	0-1	1-3

=== First leg ===
May 12, 2010
16:00 (UTC+4:30)

Gostaresh Foolad	0 – 1	Persepolis
	Report	Sheys Rezaei 12'

Yadegar-e Emam Stadium, Tabriz
Attendance: 50,000
Referee: Khodadad Afsharian

Gostaresh Foolad	Persepolis

Foolad:
GK	22	(Iran) Hamed Riahi
DF	32	(Iran) Ali Ansarian
DF	2	(Iran) Meisam Hosseini
DF		(Iran) Ahad Shabani
MF	26	(Iran) Ruhollah Abdollahi
MF	9	(Iran) Morteza Ghorbanpour	(substituted off) 65'
MF		(Iran) Amir Nezamipour	(substituted off) 85'
MF	38	(Iran) Naser Azarkeyvan	(substituted off) 65'
MF	27	(Iran) Abbas Aghaei
FW	34	(Brazil) Silas Feitosa Jose De Souza
FW	10	(Iran) Rasoul Khatibi (c)
Substitutes:
MF	37	(Iran) Hamedreza Divsalar	(substituted on) 65'
MF		(Iran) Mohsen Dalir	(substituted on) 85'
FW	29	(Mali) Makan Dembélé	(substituted on) 65'
Manager:
(Iran) Farhad Kazemi

Persepolis:
GK	20	(Iran) Alireza Haghighi
DF	13	(Iran) Sheys Rezaei (c)
DF	18	(Iran) Ebrahim Shakouri	(substituted off) 30'
DF	2	(Iran) Alireza Mohammad
DF	3	(Iran) Sepehr Heidari
MF	25	(Iran) Mehdi Shiri
MF	26	(Iran) Hamidreza Aliasgari	(substituted off) 67'
MF	11	(Iran) Hossein Badamaki
MF	21	(Iraq) Hawar Mohammed	(substituted off) 78'
MF	27	(Brazil) Tiago Alves Fraga
FW	9	(Iran) Mohsen Khalili
Substitutes:
DF	17	(Iran) Jalal Akbari	(substituted on) 30'
FW	30	(Iran) Mojtaba Zarei	(substituted on) 67'
MF	16	(Iran) Mohammad Mansouri	(substituted on) 78'
Manager:
(Iran) Ali Daei

=== Second leg ===
May 24, 2010
18:00 (UTC+4:30)

Persepolis	3 – 1	Gostaresh Foolad
Tiago Alves Fraga 31'(P); Hamidreza Aliasgari 34'; Mohsen Khalili 77'	Report	Rasoul Khatibi 73'(P)

Azadi Stadium, Tehran
Attendance: 100,000
Referee: Masoud Moradi

Persepolis	Gostaresh Foolad

Persepolis:
GK	20	(Iran) Alireza Haghighi
DF	2	(Iran) Alireza Mohammad
DF	13	(Iran) Sheys Rezaei (c)
DF	3	(Iran) Sepehr Heidari
DF	17	(Iran) Jalal Akbari
MF	11	(Iran) Hossein Badamaki
MF	27	(Brazil) Tiago Alves Fraga	(substituted off) 72'
MF	26	(Iran) Hamidreza Aliasgari
MF	25	(Iran) Mehdi Shiri
MF	16	(Iran) Mohammad Mansouri	(substituted off) 75'
FW	24	(Iran) Hadi Norouzi	(substituted off) 67'
Substitutes:
FW	9	(Iran) Mohsen Khalili	(substituted on) 67'
MF	6	(Iran) Karim Bagheri	(substituted on) 72'
MF	21	(Iraq) Hawar Mohammed	(substituted on) 75'
Manager:
(Iran) Ali Daei

Foolad:
GK	22	(Iran) Hamed Riahi		(substituted off) 11'
DF	32	(Iran) Ali Ansarian
DF	2	(Iran) Meisam Hosseini
DF	24	(Cameroon) Thomas Manga
MF	26	(Iran) Ruhollah Abdollahi
MF	9	(Iran) Morteza Ghorbanpour
MF		(Iran) Omid Nezamipour
MF		(Iran) Mohsen Dalir		(substituted off) 46'
MF	27	(Iran) Abbas Aghaei
FW	34	(Brazil) Silas Feitosa Jose De Souza		(substituted off) 55'
FW	10	(Iran) Rasoul Khatibi (c)
Substitutes:
GK		(Iran) Mohammad Torkaman	(red card) 55'	(substituted on) 11'
MF	38	(Iran) Naser Azarkeyvan		(substituted on) 46'
MF		(Iran) Meisam Armian		(substituted on) 55'
Manager:
(Iran) Farhad Kazemi

== Champions ==
Champions 2009–10 Hazfi Cup

Fourth title

== See also ==
- 2009–10 Persian Gulf Cup
- 2009–10 Azadegan League
- 2009–10 Iran Football's 2nd Division
- 2009–10 Iran Football's 3rd Division
- 2009–10 Hazfi Cup
- Iranian Super Cup
- 2009–10 Iranian Futsal Super League
