= Alireza Nourmohammadi =

Iranian footballer

Alireza Noormohammadi
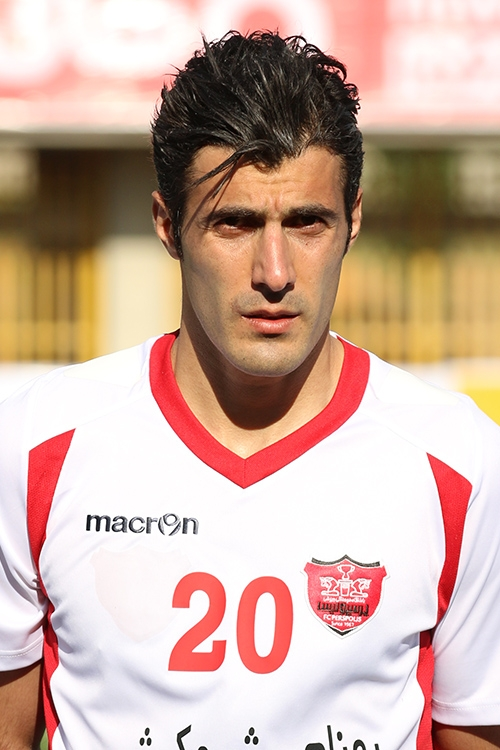

Personal information
- Full name: Alireza Nourmohammadi Tesieh
- Date of birth: 3 July 1981 (age 45)
- Place of birth: Tehran, Iran
- Height: 1.88 m (6 ft 2 in)
- Position: Centre back

Youth career
- 1999–2002: Zob Ahan

Senior career*
Years	Team	Apps	(Gls)
2002–2007	Zob Ahan	56	(0)
2007–2010	Rah Ahan	90	(3)
2010–2016	Persepolis	138	(9)
2016	Siah Jamegan	4	(0)
2017	Sanat Naft Abadan	9	(0)
2018–2019	Sepidrood	18	(1)
- * Club domestic league appearances and goals

Alireza Nourmohammadi Tesieh (Persian: علیرضا نورمحمدی; born 3 July 1981) is an Iranian former football defender.

== Club career ==
He started his professional career with Zob Ahan in the summer of 2004. He moved to Rah Ahan in the summer of 2007.

=== Persepolis ===
He played 3 seasons for Rah Ahan and moved to Persepolis in the summer of 2010. In 2013, he extended his contract with Persepolis another two-years, keeping him in the team till 2015.

=== Club career statistics ===
As of 21 August 2015.

Club	Division	Season	League		Hazfi Cup		Asia		Total	
Club	Division	Season	Apps	Goals	Apps	Goals	Apps	Goals	Apps	Goals
Zob Ahan	Pro League	2004–05	21	0	1	0	–	–	22	0
Zob Ahan	Pro League	2005–06	18	0	1	0	–	–	19	0
Zob Ahan	Pro League	2006–07	17	0	1	0	–	–	18	0
Rah Ahan	Pro League	2007–08	30	1	3	0	–	–	33	1
Rah Ahan	Pro League	2008–09	30	1	6	1	–	–	36	2
Rah Ahan	Pro League	2009–10	30	1	0	0	–	–	30	1
Persepolis	Pro League	2010–11	26	1	6	1	6	0	38	2
Persepolis	Pro League	2011–12	29	3	3	0	2	0	34	3
Persepolis	Pro League	2012–13	21	1	1	0	–	–	22	1
Persepolis	Pro League	2013–14	7	1	3	1	–	–	10	2
Persepolis	Pro League	2014–15	22	0	4	0	8	0	34	0
Persepolis	Pro League	2015–16	9	0	2	0	–	–	11	0
Sanat Naft	Pro League	2016–17	12	0	0	0	–	–	12	0
Sepidrood	Pro League	2017–18	11	1		0	–	–		1
Sepidrood	Pro League	2018–19	2	0	0	0	–	–	2	0
Career Total			279	10	31	3	16	0	327	13

- Assist Goals

Season	Team	Assists
09–10	Rah Ahan	0
10–11	Persepolis	1
11–12	Persepolis	0
12–13	Persepolis	0
13–14	Persepolis	0
14–15	Persepolis	1

== International career ==
He started his International Career under Afshin Ghotbi in November 2010 against Nigeria. He also was invited in June 2011 by Carlos Queiroz.

== Honours ==
Persepolis

- Iran Pro League runner-up: 2013–14, 2015–16
- Hazfi Cup: 2010–11, runner-up 2012–13
