= Gholamreza Rezaei =

Iranian footballer (born 1984)

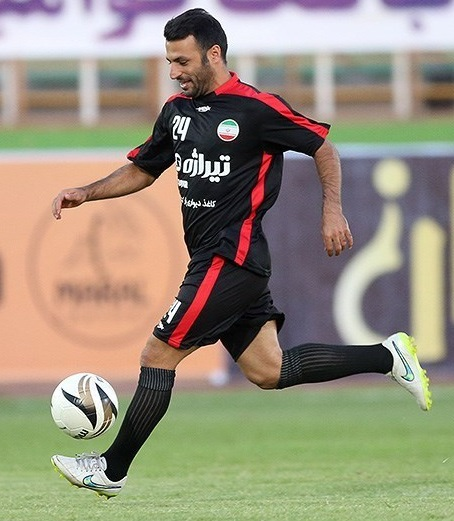
- Gholamreza Rezaei in Hadi Norouzi's memorial match

Personal information
- Full name: Gholamreza Rezaei
- Date of birth: 6 August 1984 (age 42)
- Place of birth: Shiraz, Iran
- Height: 1.69 m (5 ft 7 in)
- Positions: Winger; striker

Youth career
- 1998–2000: Vali Asr Shiraz Academy
- 2000–2004: Bargh

Senior career*
Years	Team	Apps	(Gls)
2004–2007	Fajr Sepasi	75	(11)
2007–2009	Saba Battery	59	(12)
2009–2010	Foolad	17	(7)
2010–2013	Persepolis	54	(10)
2013–2014	Foolad	14	(0)
2014–2015	Naft Tehran	25	(5)
2015–2017	Saipa	54	(8)
2017–2018	Sepidrood	4	(0)

International career^{‡}
2008–2013	Iran	50	(11)
2010	Iran Olympic (Wild Card)	7	(1)
Medal record
Representing Iran
West Asian Football Federation Championship
Gold medal – first place	2008 Iran	Team competition
- * Club domestic league appearances and goals as of 8 January 2017 ‡ National team caps and goals as of 20 August 2013

Gholamreza Rezaei (Persian: غلامرضا رضایی, born 6 August 1984) is a retired Iranian football player who last played for Sepidrood as a forward in the Iran Pro League.

== Club career ==
=== Early years ===
He started his career in Fajr Sepasi in his hometown, Shiraz, where he was introduced to Iranian Football, after showing his talent in Fajr, he was bought Saba Battery. At the end of 2007–2008 season, Persepolis showed interest in him, Rezaei himself stated that he would like to join Persepolis despite being contracted for another year. But, he remained in Saba because the club's officials rejected the move. He had an average season as he was benched at sometimes and was busy with a number of matches for Team Melli. He moved to Emirates in summer 2009. After an unsuccessful half-season at the UAE he moved back to the IPL joining Foolad.

=== Persepolis ===
For the 2010–11 season, he joined Persepolis re-uniting with his former manager at the Team Melli, Ali Daei. He made an immediate impact and scored in three of his first four games, all of them being goals which would be the game deciders. He extended his contract with Persepolis for two years, keeping him in the team till 2014.

On 30 December 2012, he scored the fastest goal in the history of Iran Pro League (the record was broken by Mohammad Reza Khalatbari on 10 December 2014) and also the fastest in 2012 in a 2–0 win against his former team, Fajr Sepasi at Hafezieh Stadium. He was mostly used as the substitute in 2012–13 season. On 4 November 2013, Rezaei announced that will be left Persepolis in January 2014. He signed a contract with Foolad on 17 November 2013.

=== Foolad ===
In his first year with Foolad he made 14 league appearances, failing to score. His first goal with the club came on 16 April 2014 in an AFC Champions League match against El Jaish of Qatar. Foolad won that match and advanced to the knockout stages of the Champions League.

=== Naft Tehran ===
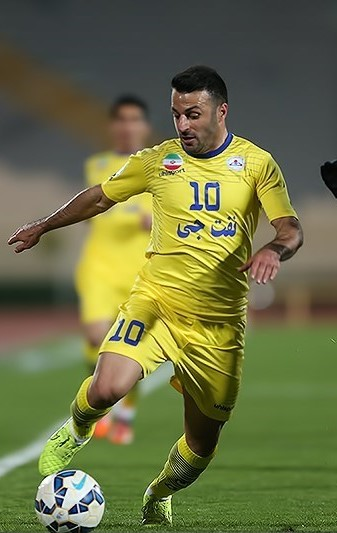
Gholamreza Rezaei with Naft Tehran in 2015.

Rezaei joined Naft Tehran on 1 July 2014, after he signed a two-year contract with the club on 23 June 2014.

=== Club career statistics ===
As of 20 May 2015

Club	Division	Season	League		Hazfi Cup		Asia		Total	
Club	Division	Season	Apps	Goals	Apps	Goals	Apps	Goals	Apps	Goals
Fajr	Pro League	2004–05	27	4			–	–	27	4
Fajr	Pro League	2005–06	24	5			–	–	24	5
Fajr	Pro League	2006–07	24	2			–	–	24	0
Saba	Pro League	2007–08	32	7	2	0	–	–	34	7
Saba	Pro League	2008–09	26	5	0	0	4	0	30	5
United Arab Emirates			League		President's Cup		Asia		Total	
Emirates	UAE League	2009–10	0	0	0	0	–	–	0	0
Iran			League		Hazfi Cup		Asia		Total	
Foolad	Pro League	2009–10	17	7	1	0	–	–	18	7
Persepolis	Pro League	2010–11	23	5	1	0	2	0	26	5
Persepolis	Pro League	2011–12	28	2	2	0	6	2	36	4
Persepolis	Pro League	2012–13	24	3	5	1	–	–	29	4
Persepolis	Pro League	2013–14	9	0	0	0	–	–	9	0
Foolad	Pro League	2013–14	14	0	2	0	7	3	22	3
Naft Tehran	Pro League	2014–15	12	5	3	0	8	2	23	7
Saipa	Pro League	2015-16					–	–		
Career totals			255	45	16	1	27	7	300	53

- Assist Goals

Season	Team	Assists
05–06	Fajr	3
06–07	Fajr	2
07–08	Saba	5
08–09	Saba	3
09–10	Foolad	2
10–11	Persepolis	6
11–12	Persepolis	7
12–13	Persepolis	5
13–14	Persepolis	0
13–14	Foolad	2
14–15	Naft Tehran	0

== International career ==
Rezaei made his debut for the Iran national football team on 25 May 2008, in a friendly match with Zambia that ended 3–2.

In this match, Rezaei scored the second goal for Iran. A cross by Hajsafi found Rezaei on the far post, and Rezaei's slightly deflected shot found its way into the net. In World Cup 2010 Qualifying Rezaei scored twice for his country against Syria and Kuwait. He was called and played for Team Melli in 2010 FIFA World Cup qualification and 2014 FIFA World Cup qualification and 2011 AFC Asian Cup qualification and also 2015 AFC Asian Cup qualification. He won the 2008 WAFF and ended the campaign in quarterfinal at 2011 Asian Cup.

=== International goals ===
Scores and results list Iran's goal tally first.

#	Date	Venue	Opponent	Score	Result	Competition
1	25 May 2008	Azadi Stadium, Tehran	Zambia	2–0	3–2	International Match
2	14 June 2008	Abbasiyyin Stadium, Damascus	Syria	1–0	2–0	2010 FIFA World Cup qualification
3	22 June 2008	Azadi Stadium, Tehran	Kuwait	2–0	2–0	2010 FIFA World Cup qualification
4	7 August 2008	Takhti Stadium, Tehran	Palestine	2–0	3–0	2008 WAFF
5	13 August 2008	Takhti Stadium, Tehran	Syria	2–0	2–0	2008 WAFF
6	9 November 2008	Khalifa International Stadium, Doha	Qatar	1–0	1–0	International Match
7	14 January 2009	Azadi Stadium, Tehran	Singapore	3–0	6–0	2011 AFC Asian Cup qualification
8	6 January 2010	Former National Stadium, Singapore, Kallang	Singapore	3–1	3–1	2011 AFC Asian Cup qualification
9	11 January 2011	Ahmed bin Ali Stadium, Al Rayyan	Iraq	1–1	2–1	2011 Asian Cup
10	11 October 2011	Azadi Stadium, Tehran	Bahrain	6–0	6–0	2014 WCQ
11	15 November 2011	Gelora Bung Karno Stadium, Jakarta	Indonesia	3–0	4–1	2014 WCQ

== Honours ==
Persepolis

- Hazfi Cup: 2010–11; runner-up: 2012–13

Foolad

- Iran Pro League: 2013–14
