= Hamidreza Aliasgari =

Iranian footballer (born 1990)

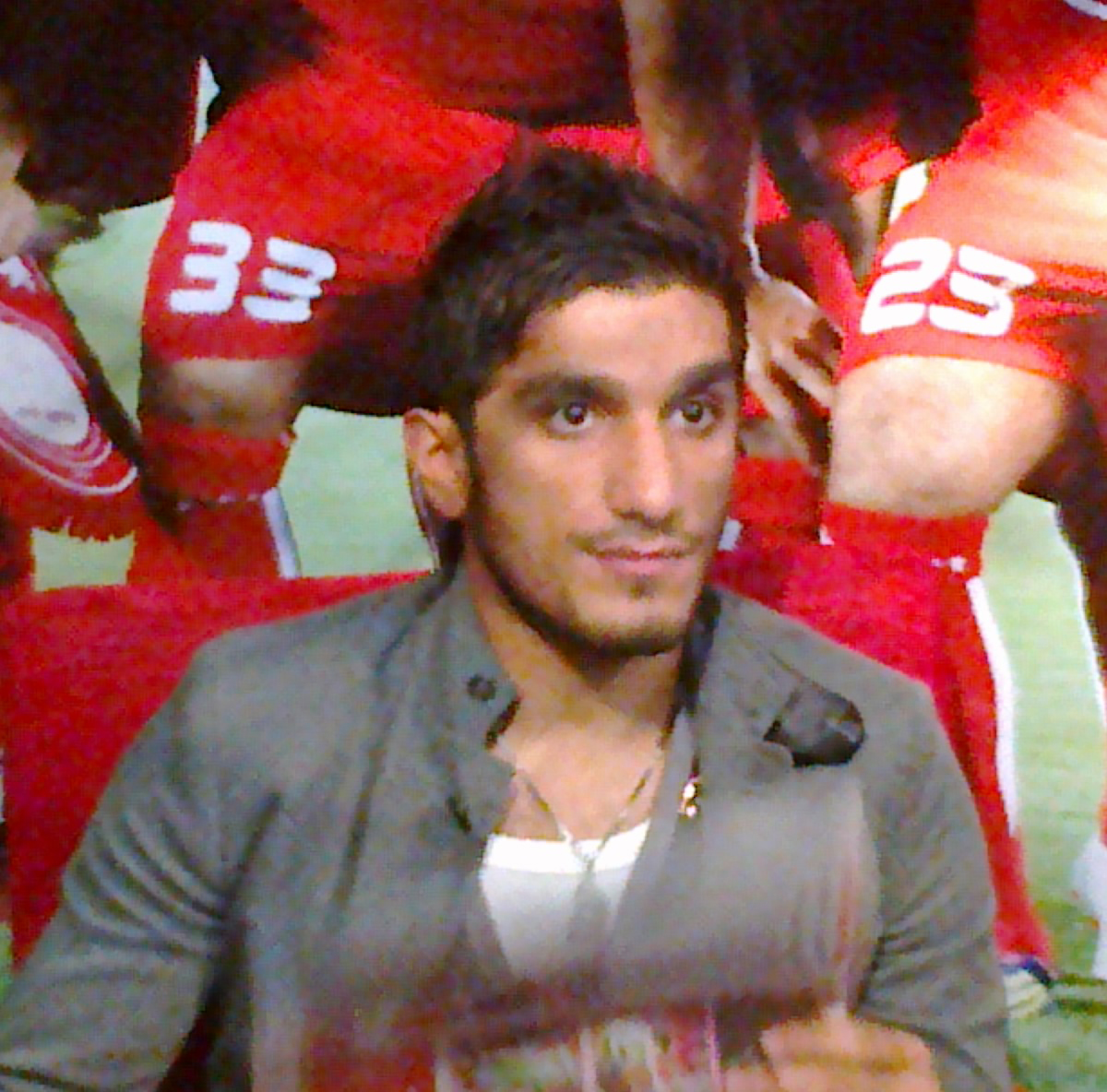
- Aliasgari in 2011

Personal information
- Full name: Hamidreza Aliasgari Dehaghi
- Date of birth: 25 May 1990 (age 36)
- Place of birth: Rey, Iran
- Height: 1.74 m (5 ft 9 in)
- Positions: Full back; winger

Team information
- Current team: Baadraan
- Number: 24

Youth career
- 2003–2005: Iranzamin
- 2005–2006: Bank Melli
- 2006–2007: Fajr Sepah Tehran
- 2007–2008: Persepolis

Senior career*
| Years | Team | Apps | (Gls) |
| 2007–2015 | Persepolis | 110 | (4) |
| 2012–2013 | → Rah Ahan (loan) | 11 | (0) |
| 2015–2016 | Rah Ahan | 4 | (0) |
| 2016–2017 | Siah Jamegan | 26 | (1) |
| 2017 | Machine Sazi | 15 | (0) |
| 2017–2018 | Siah Jamegan | 14 | (2) |
| 2018–2019 | Oxin | 16 | (0) |
| 2019– | Baadraan | 8 | (0) |
- Gol Reyhan Alborz F.C.
- Baadraan Tehran F.C.

International career^{‡}
| 2005–2006 | Iran U17 | 6 | (1) |
| 2006 | Iran U20 | 4 | (1) |
| 2008–2011 | Iran U23 | 19 | (6) |
| 2010 | Iran | 1 | (0) |
- * Club domestic league appearances and goals as of 8 December 2016 ‡ National team caps and goals as of 19 June 2011

Hamidreza Aliasgari (Persian: حمیدرضا علی‌عسگری, born 25 May 1990) is an Iranian football midfielder. His uncle is Abdulali Ali-Asgari.

In 2022, Aliasgari was arrested during the Mahsa Amini protests by the Islamic Republic of Iran and was taken to a detention center. He was later released on bail.

== Club career ==
=== Persepolis (first period) ===
==== 2007–2008 ====
He made his debut for Persepolis when he got subbed into the Hazfi Cup in the 2007–08 season. He failed to make a league appearance while he was part of the champion team.

==== 2008–2009 ====
Aliasgari made his first appearance in the Iran Pro League against Zob Ahan as a starter and played 58th minute in right winger position. He scored his first goal for Persepolis in the Hazfi Cup against Sanaye Talaei Semnan. He finished the season with 14 appearances and one goal.

==== 2009–2010 ====
He started the season in Zlatko Kranjčar's line-up while he was used as a defensive midfielder. He was benched for most of the season and whenever he subbed in, he played in winger role. He replaced Alireza Mohammad (who suspend before Sorkhabi derby) in the line up and showed his versatility in the right back position and gave the assist for Persepolis equalizing goal in a game where they went on to win 2–1. At 19 years and 242 days he became the youngest player to play in the Sorkhabi derby. He scored in the 2010 Hazfi Cup Final against Gostaresh Foulad and finished the season with 18 appearances and one goal.

==== 2010–2011 ====
In the 2010–11 season he started all of the games until being suspended, playing as a left back. He scored a double against Ittihad in 2011 Asian Champions League in 3–1 home win. In his best season in Persepolis, he made 35 appearances and scored 4 times.

==== 2011–2012 ====
He was injured in Team Melli's training camp before the season start and lost the pre-season and a part of the first mid-season. He was given #7 that was worn by club legend Ali Parvin for many years. He played in all 6 games for Persepolis in the 2012 Asian Champions League. Aliasgari finished the season with 22 appearances while he failed in netting.

==== 2012–2013 ====
He extended his contract for another three seasons at season starts. He played in the season debut against Sanat Naft as a substitute for Afshin Esmaeilzadeh. He benched in the first mid-season and made 7 appearances (five as substitute). After problems with Manuel José, the club disciplinary committee decided to send him to Persepolis B trainings. But they canceled their decision after his official apologies.

=== Rah Ahan Tehran F.C. ===
In December 2012 he was listed in Yahya Golmohammadi's surplus list and forced to depart from Persepolis. He was loaned to Rah Ahan, where he worked under his former coach Ali Daei for six months. He made 11 appearances for Rah Ahan before returning to Persepolis.

=== Persepolis (second period) ===
==== 2013–2014 ====
He returned to Persepolis after a mid-season and re-united with his former coach, Ali Daei. He missed most of the season because of injuries. He made 18 appearances and scored 2 times for Persepolis in this season.

==== 2014–2015 ====
He changed his jersey number from 7 to 26, the number he wore when he joined Persepolis in 2007. He was named in Ali Daei's line-up in the season debut against Naft Tehran where he was used as a left back. After 3 matches he injured from hamstring muscle and missed 3 matches. On 28 June 2015, he officially announced that he will not be part of the Persepolis squad in 2015–16 season. Aliasgari made 141 appearances and scored 8 times in 8 seasons for Persepolis F.C.

== International career ==
=== U-20 ===
Hamidreza Aliasgari played in all four games for Iran in the AFC Youth Championship 2006.

=== U-23 ===
He was part of Iran U23 in Guangzhou 2010 and 2012 Summer Olympic Qualifications. He reached 4th place with Iran U23 in Guangzhou 2010 while he scored the winning goal against Oman in the quarter-final match.

=== Senior team ===
He reached the Team Melli at the end of the 2010–11 season and made his debut in a match against Armenia.

== Honours ==
Persepolis

- Iran Pro League (1): 2007–08
- Iran Pro League: 2013–14 (Runner-up)
- Hazfi Cup (2): 2009–10, 2010–11
