= Hadi Norouzi =

Iranian footballer (1985–2015)

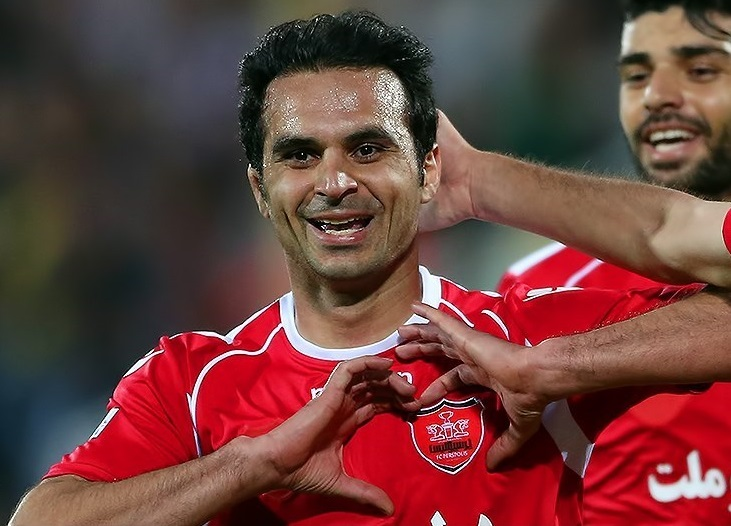
- Norouzi in 2015

Personal information
- Full name: Hadi Norouzi Pouri
- Date of birth: 22 June 1985
- Place of birth: Kapurchal, Babol, Iran
- Date of death: 1 October 2015 (aged 30)
- Place of death: Tehran, Iran
- Height: 1.77 m (5 ft 10 in)
- Positions: Striker; winger

Youth career
- 2000–2007: Persepolis

Senior career*
Years	Team	Apps	(Gls)
2005–2006	Pasargad		
2006	Fajr Sepah Tehran		
2007–2008	Damash Iranian	22	(10)
2008–2015	Persepolis	152	(26)
2013–2014	→ Naft Tehran (loan)	15	(4)

International career
2009–2011	Iran	9	(0)
- * Club domestic league appearances and goals

Hadi Norouzi (Persian: هادی نوروزی, 22 June 1985 – 1 October 2015) was an Iranian footballer who played as a striker. He spent most of his career with Persepolis in the Persian Gulf Pro League.

He joined Persepolis youth team in 2000 and was promoted to the first team squad in 2008 by Afshin Ghotbi after spend a short spell at Pasargad and Damash Iranian. In 2013, he joined Naft Tehran in a six-month loan contract. At the end of the season, he was returned to Persepolis and became a regular squad player.

On 1 October 2015, Norouzi died of a heart attack in his sleep at the age of 30. At the time of his death, he was Persepolis' captain, having been named as the club captain two months before.

== Club career ==
=== Early years ===
Norouzi joined Persepolis in summer 2000 from Persepolis U19. He played four seasons for Persepolis U19 and moved to Pasargad. He moved back to Persepolis U21 after he served his conscription in Fajr Sepah Tehran. He left the Persepolis U21 teams for Damah Iranian's Senior team of Division 1.

=== Persepolis ===
Next year he returned to Persepolis, where he was mostly used as a substitute in 2008–09 season. He was top assistant of Persepolis in 2010–11 season, and extended his contract with Persepolis another two-years in summer 2013, keeping him in the team until 2015.

=== Loan to Naft Tehran ===
He joined Naft Tehran with a season-long loan on 26 November 2013. He made 12 appearances for Naft and scored three goals.

=== Return to Persepolis ===
Norouzi returned to Persepolis before the start of 2014–15 season after spending six months at Naft Tehran. He was named captain of the club before the start of the 2015–16 season after former captain Mohammad Nouri left the club.

== International career ==
He started his International Career under Afshin Ghotbi in August 2009 against Bosnia and Herzegovina. He played nine international cups.

== Personal life ==
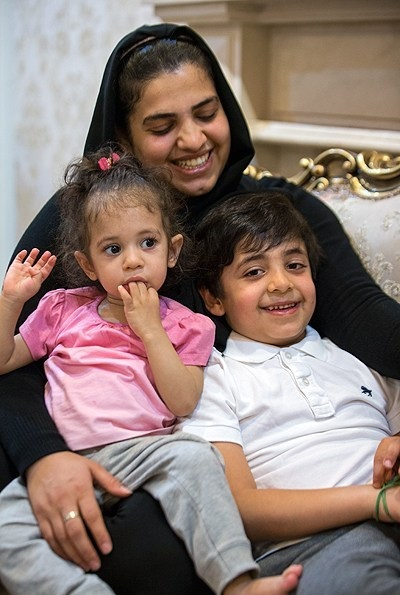
Noroozi's spouse Masoumeh Ebrahimpour and their two children, 8 March 2016.

Norouzi had four siblings, all brothers and he was the youngest son of his family. He married Masoumeh Ebrahimpour in 2003. The couple had two children, a boy Hani (born 2009) and a girl, Hana (born 2014).

== Death and tributes ==
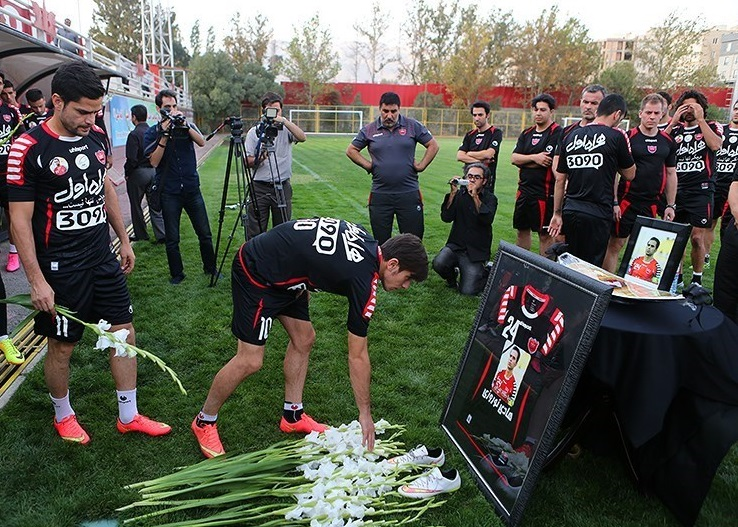
Persepolis players in the first training after Norouzi's death

In the morning of 1 October 2015, Persepolis team manager Mahmoud Khordbin announced that the club captain Hadi Norouzi died in his sleep from a heart attack due to hypertrophic cardiomyopathy. Resuscitation attempts on the way to the hospital failed. Norouzi was 30. Persepolis manager Branko Ivanković described the news as a big shock for him and his team. Persepolis players and legends like Ali Parvin, Ahmad Reza Abedzadeh, Karim Bagheri and former managers Afshin Ghotbi and Ali Daei paid tributes to Norouzi and his family in their messages. Iran Pro League clubs also paid tributes to Persepolis club and fans in Twitter. Iran national football team players observed a minute's silence for Norouzi at their training camp in United Arab Emirates. Many fans also immediately flocked to Persepolis' training ground, Derafshifar Stadium where he had participated in a training session in last day without any problem, to lay flowers and light candles.

A memorial was held at Azadi Stadium on 2 October which was attended by 20,000 mourners which rivals Esteghlal fans also attended the ceremony. His body remained at the stadium for one day and then was transferred to Babol. His funeral was held on the following day and he was buried at his hometown, Kapur Chal village at Babol.

On 4 October 2015, former teammate Karim Ansarifard dedicated his goal in his team's 5–1 win in the Super League Greece to him, by raising a shirt with his name and number (#24, REST IN PEACE CAPTAIN). Iran national under-23 football team players also dedicated their win to Hadi Norouzi during their match against Bahrain at 2015 WAFF U-23 Championship.

In Persepolis' first match after the death of Norouzi, fans cheered-up him in 24th minute. They also made a mosaique at the stadium which shows Norouzi's name and number, "Hadi 24". Persepolis and his native city's club Khoneh Be Khoneh retired their number 24 shirt in his honour. A city square was also renamed to Hadi Norouzi square in his home town Babol.

== Career statistics ==
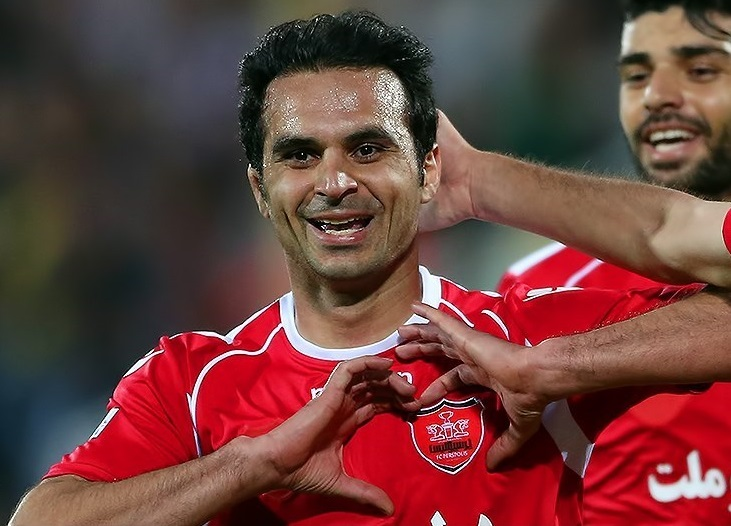
Norouzi celebrating after scoring a goal for Persepolis against Padideh

Appearances and goals by club, season and competition
Club	Season	League			Hazfi Cup		Asia		Total	
Club	Season	Division	Apps	Goals	Apps	Goals	Apps	Goals	Apps	Goals
Damash Iranian	2007–08	Azadegan League	22	10	6	4	–	–	28	14
Persepolis	2008–09	Iran Pro League	15	2	3	1	5	1	23	4
Persepolis	2009–10	Iran Pro League	30	8	5	0	–	–	35	8
Persepolis	2010–11	Iran Pro League	29	7	5	2	6	0	40	9
Persepolis	2011–12	Iran Pro League	18	2	2	0	4	0	24	2
Persepolis	2012–13	Iran Pro League	25	4	5	3	–	–	30	7
Persepolis	2013–14	Iran Pro League	10	0	1	1	–	–	11	1
Persepolis	2014–15	Iran Pro League	20	2	4	0	8	1	32	3
Persepolis	2015–16	Iran Pro League	5	1	1	0	–	–	6	1
Naft Tehran (loan)	2013–14	Iran Pro League	12	3	0	0	–	–	12	3
Career total			185	39	32	11	23	2	239	51

== Honours ==
Persepolis

- Hazfi Cup: 2009–10, 2010–11

Individual

- Assist leader of Persian Gulf Pro League: 2010–11
