= Shpejtim Arifi =

Kosovar Albanian footballer (born 1979)

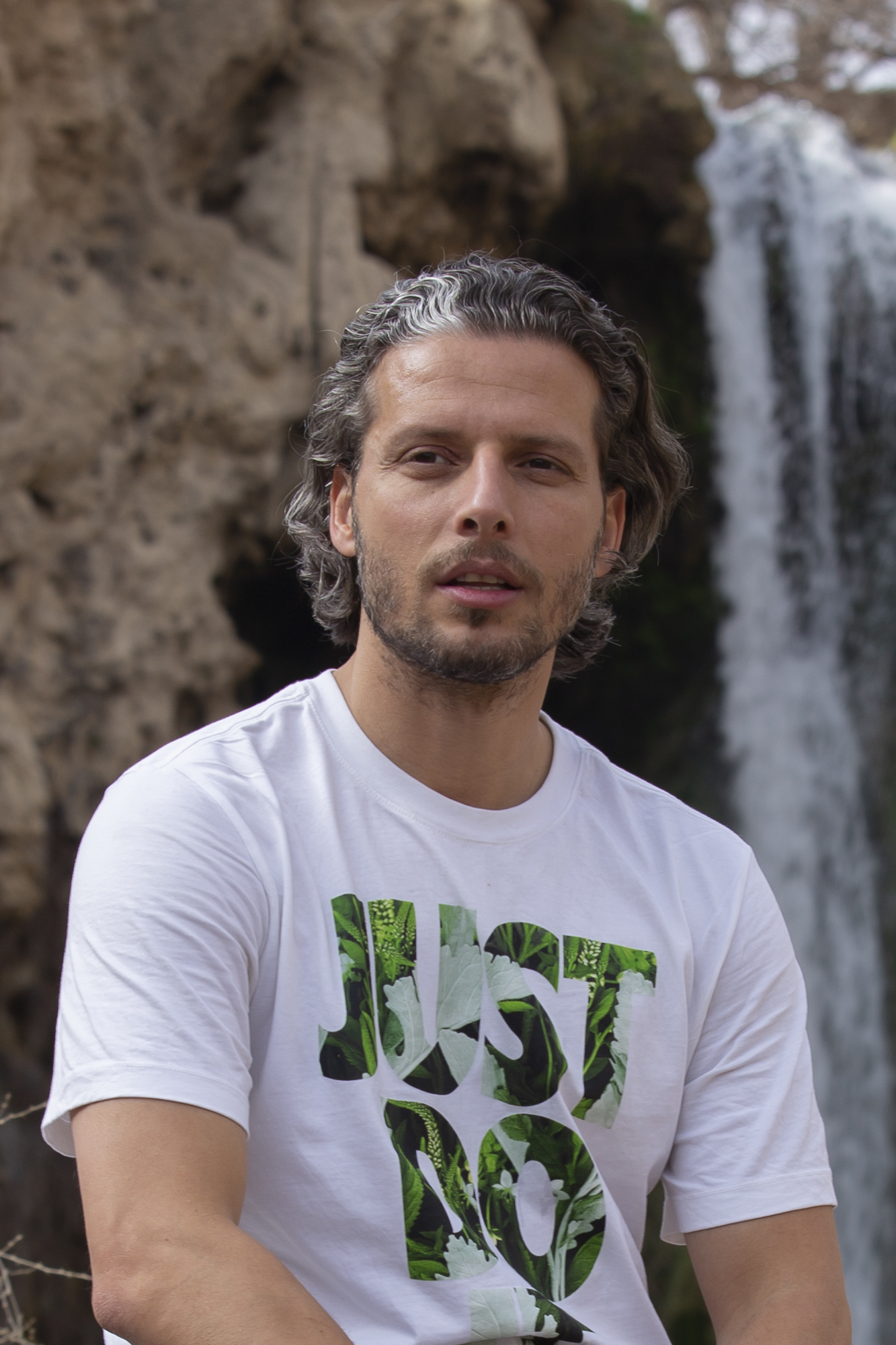
- Arifi in 2021

Personal information
- Date of birth: 3 May 1979 (age 47)
- Place of birth: Presevo, SFR Yugoslavia
- Height: 1.82 m (6 ft 0 in)
- Positions: Forward; winger

Senior career*
Years	Team	Apps	(Gls)
2001–2002	SV Südwest		
2002–2003	SV Weingarten		
2003–2004	VfR Mannheim		
2004–2005	SV Sandhausen		
2005–2006	SSV Reutlinggen	16	(4)
2006–2008	FSV Oggersheim	39	(14)
2008–2009	Payam Khorasan	31	(18)
2009–2011	Persepolis	29	(6)
2011–2012	Tractor	9	(1)
2012	Aboomoslem	7	(2)
2012–2013	SVN Zweibrücken	15	(8)
2014	Borussia Neunkirchen	3	(0)
- * Club domestic league appearances and goals

Shpejtim Arifi (born 3 May 1979) is a former professional footballer who played as a forward or winger.

== Life and career ==
Arifi was born in Pristina, SFR Yugoslavia. Arifi's older brother, Shqiprim (born 14 June 1976) is a Serbian politician serving as the head of the Alternative for Changes and served as mayor of Preševo in three separate stints from 2016 to 2024.

He played for FSV Oggersheim in 2008.

Arifi signed for the Iranian club Payam Khorasan at the end of the 2007–08 Iranian Pro League season. He was a regular player in 2008–09 for Payam and was one of the top scorers of the league. He moved to Persepolis in summer 2009. He appeared in 32 league matches for the club.

== Honours ==
SSV Reutlingen

- Oberliga Baden-Württemberg: 2005–06

Persepolis

- Hazfi Cup: 2009–10, 2010–11

Payam

- Azadegan League: 2007–08
