= Mojtaba Shiri (footballer, born 1979) =

Iranian footballer

- Mojtaba Shiri with Esteghlal Ahvaz in 2006

Personal information
- Full name: Mojtaba Shiri
- Date of birth: 29 October 1979 (age 47)
- Place of birth: Shiraz, Iran
- Height: 1.80 m (5 ft 11 in)
- Positions: Centre back; left back

Team information
- Current team: Oxin Alborz
- Number: 6

Youth career
- Bargh Shiraz

Senior career*
Years	Team	Apps	(Gls)
2003–2004	Persepolis	14	(0)
2004–2008	Esteghlal Ahvaz	110	(5)
2008–2012	Persepolis	79	(1)
2012–2013	Pas Hamedan	27	(0)
2013–2014	Sanat Naft	16	(0)

International career^{‡}
2007–2008	Iran	7	(0)
Medal record
Representing Iran
West Asian Football Federation Championship
Gold medal – first place	2007 Jordan	Team competition
West Asian Football Federation Championship
Gold medal – first place	2008 Iran	Team competition
- * Club domestic league appearances and goals as of 30 May 2012 ‡ National team caps and goals as of 6 August 2009

Mojtaba Shiri (Persian: مجتبی شیری, born 29 October 1979 in Shiraz, Iran) was an Iranian football defender. After a great season with Esteghlal Ahvaz he was soon noticed by Iran national football team coach Ali Daei and was included in the national team for the WAFF championships. His elder brother, Mehdi was also a professional football player.

== Club career ==
He started to shine in 2003–04 season with Persepolis where he was used as the defensive midfielder and moved to Esteghlal Ahvaz where he stayed for 4 seasons and had an excellent season in 2007–08 seasons where in league he played more minutes than any other player. He moved to Persepolis in summer 2008 and was used as center back, left back and defensive midfielder.

=== Club career statistics ===
- Last Update: 11 May 2013

Club performance			League		Cup		Continental		Total	
Season	Club	League	Apps	Goals	Apps	Goals	Apps	Goals	Apps	Goals
Iran			League		Hazfi Cup		Asia		Total	
2003–04	Persepolis	Pro League	14	0			–			
2004–05	Esteghlal Ahvaz	Pro League	18	0			–			
2005–06	Esteghlal Ahvaz	Pro League	28	0			–			
2006–07	Esteghlal Ahvaz	Pro League	30	1			–			
2007–08	Esteghlal Ahvaz	Pro League	34	4			–			
2008–09	Persepolis	Pro League	30	0	2	0	6	0	38	0
2009–10	Persepolis	Pro League	18	0	2	0	–		20	0
2010–11	Persepolis	Pro League	12	1	5	0	2	0	19	1
2011–12	Persepolis	Pro League	19	0	3	0	0	0	22	0
Career total			203	6			8	0		

- Assist Goals

Season	Team	Assists
05–06	Esteghlal Ahvaz	1
07–08	Esteghlal Ahvaz	1
08–09	Persepolis	1
09–10	Persepolis	0
10–11	Persepolis	0
11–12	Persepolis	1

== International career ==
He played in WAFF 2007 and was invited again under Ali Daei for the first round of world cup qualifications in 2008 where he came on the pitch as a substitute against Kuwait. He was invited again for WAFF 2008.

== Honours ==
=== Club ===
- Iran's Premier Football League
  - Runner up: 1
    - 2006–07 with Esteghlal Ahvaz
- Hazfi Cup
  - Winner: 2
    - 2009–10 with Persepolis
    - 2010–11 with Persepolis
