= Mohammad Rostami =

Iranian footballer

Personal information
- Full name: Mohammad Rostami
- Date of birth: 15 September 1985 (age 41)
- Place of birth: Lasht-e Nesha, Iran
- Position: Defender

Team information
- Current team: Damash Gilan
- Number: 5

Senior career*
Years	Team	Apps	(Gls)
2006–2012	Malavan	74	(0)
2012–2014	Aboomoslem	16	(0)
2014–2016	Damash Gilan	50	(6)
2016–2017	Sepidrood		
2017–2018	Mashin Sazi		
2018–2020	Damash Gilan		
2020–2021	Baadraan		
2021–2022	Malavan		
2022	Van Pars Naghsh-e-Jahan		
2022–	Damash Gilan		
- * Club domestic league appearances and goals as of 16 May 2015 (UTC)

Mohammad Rostami (born 15 September 1985) is an Iranian footballer who plays for Malavan F.C. in the IPL.

== Club career ==
Rostami has played his entire career with Malavan F.C.

=== Club career statistics ===
- Last Update: 22 August 2011

Club performance			League		Continental		Total	
Season	Club	League	Apps	Goals	Apps	Goals	Apps	Goals
Iran			League		Hazfi Cup		Total	
2006–07	Malavan	Pro League	3	0				
2007–08	Malavan	Pro League	4	0	0	0	4	0
2008–09	Malavan	Pro League	7	0	1	0	8	0
2009–10	Malavan	Pro League	24	0	1	0	25	0
2010–11	Malavan	Pro League	25	0	4	1	29	1
2011–12	Malavan	Pro League	11	0	0	0	11	0
Career total			74	0				
