= Sékou Berthé =

Malian footballer

Personal information
- Date of birth: 7 October 1977 (age 49)
- Place of birth: Bamako, Mali
- Height: 1.93 m (6 ft 4 in)
- Position: Centre-back

Senior career*
Years	Team	Apps	(Gls)
1995–1997	Djoliba AC		
1997–1999	Monaco B	0	(0)
1999–2003	Troyes	29	(0)
2003–2005	West Bromwich Albion	3	(0)
2006–2009	Panionios	46	(1)
2010–2011	Persepolis	5	(0)
Total		83	(1)

International career
1997–2005	Mali	15	(0)
- * Club domestic league appearances and goals

Sékou Berthé (born 7 October 1977) is a Malian former professional footballer who played as a centre-back.

== Club career ==
Berthé was born in Bamako, Mali.

=== Troyes ===
On 7 August 2001, he played for Troyes in a 0–0 draw against Newcastle United in the 2001 UEFA Intertoto Cup.

=== West Brom ===
On 23 September 2003, Berthé had his full starting League Cup debut for West Bromwich Albion against Hartlepool United, they went on to win 2–1. On 4 October 2003, he made his full starting Championship league debut for West Brom against Gillingham. In February 2005, he agreed the termination of his contract with West Brom.

=== Panionios ===
On 27 October 2007, Berthe played 90 minutes in Panionios F.C.'s 1–1 draw against Helsingborg in the 2007–08 UEFA Cup. On 6 December 2007, Berthe played 90 minutes away to Austria Wien in the UEFA Cup. On 19 December 2007, Panionios lost 3–2 at home to Bordeaux in the UEFA Cup which resulted in Panionios finishing 4th in Group H and being unable to proceed to the next round.

=== Persepolis ===
On 21 October 2010, Berthé commenced training with Iranian Pro League giants Persepolis. On 13 November 2010, he signed a six-month deal with the club.

== Career statistics ==
=== Club ===
Appearances and goals by club, season and competition
Club	Season	League			Cup		Continental		Total	
Club	Season	Division	Apps	Goals	Apps	Goals	Apps	Goals	Apps	Goals
Troyes	1999–2000	Division 1	10	0	1	0	0	0	11	0
Troyes	2000–01	Division 1	6	0	0	0	0	0	6	0
Troyes	2001–02	Division 1	4	0	0	0	2	0	6	0
Troyes	2002–03	Ligue 1	9	0	1	0	6	1	16	1
Troyes	Total		29	0	2	0	8	1	39	1
West Bromwich Albion	2003–04	First Division	3	0	1	0	0	0	4	0
Panionios	2006–07	Super League Greece	20	1			0	0	20	1
Panionios	2007–08	Super League Greece	16	0			4	0	20	0
Panionios	2008–09	Super League Greece	10	0			0	0	10	0
Panionios	Total		46	1			4	0	50	1
Persepolis	2010–11	Persian Gulf Cup	5	0	0	0	2	0	7	0
Career total			83	1	3	0	16	1	102	2

== Honours ==
Persepolis

- Hazfi Cup: 2010–11
