= Maziar Zare =

Iranian footballer

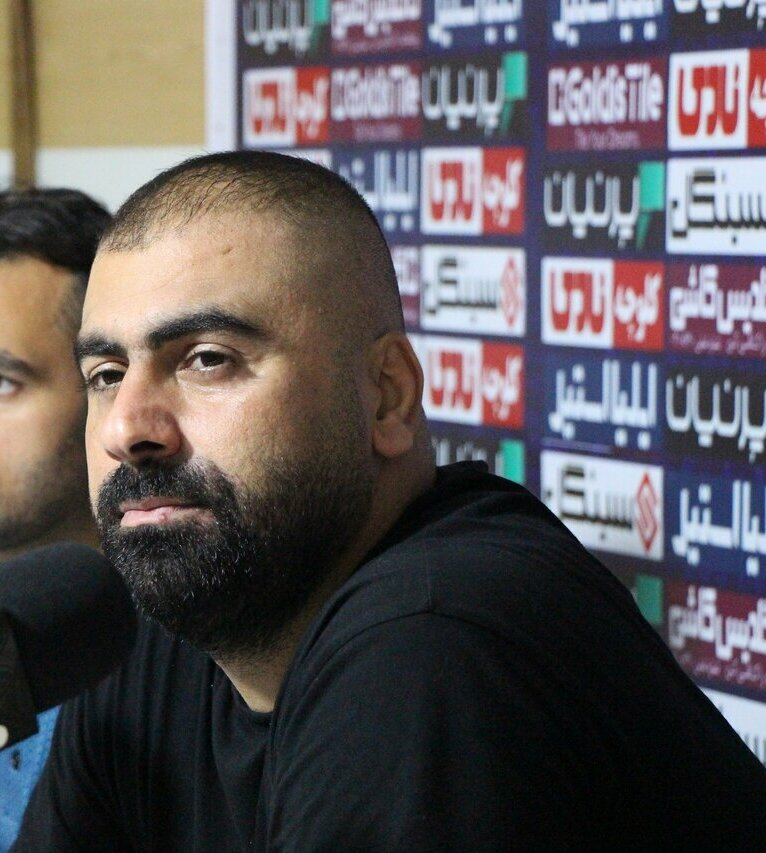
- Zare in 2022

Personal information
- Full name: Maziar Zare Eshghdoust
- Date of birth: 22 December 1984 (age 41)
- Place of birth: Bandar Anzali, Iran
- Height: 1.85 m (6 ft 1 in)
- Position: Defensive midfielder

Team information
- Current team: Malavan (manager)

Youth career
- 2000–2004: Malavan

Senior career*
Years	Team	Apps	(Gls)
2004–2008	Malavan	105	(7)
2008–2009	Persepolis	30	(4)
2009–2010	Emirates Club	13	(2)
2010	Sharjah	4	(0)
2010–2012	Persepolis	59	(6)
2012–2016	Malavan	96	(9)
2016–2017	Khooneh Be Khooneh	23	(2)

International career^{‡}
2006	Iran U23	6	(2)
2007–2014	Iran	26	(3)

Managerial career
- 2019–2020: Malavan (assistant)
- 2020–2023: Malavan
- 2024: Shams Azar
- 2024–: Malavan
Medal record
Representing Iran
Asian Games
Bronze medal – third place	2006 Qatar	Team competition
West Asian Football Federation Championship
Gold medal – first place	2007 Jordan	Team competition
- * Club domestic league appearances and goals as of 22 April 2016 ‡ National team caps and goals as of 16 October 2012

Maziar Zare Eshghdoost (Persian: مازیار زارع عشقدوست, born 22 December 1984 in Bandar Anzali, Iran) is an Iranian football coach and former player who most recently manages Malavan F.C.

He is dubbed as The New Ghayeghran after the late Sirous Ghayeghran, Malavan's legend and also wore the coveted number 9 shirt.

== Club career ==
=== Malavan (2004-2008, 2012-2016) ===
- Zare started at Malavan FC, playing in over 100 league matches and scoring 7 goals from 2004 to 2008.
- He returned to Malavan in 2012, staying with the team until 2016.
- Zare wore the number 9 shirt at Malavan, which was retired in honor of Sirous Ghayeghran and is now part of the club's collection. He stayed with Malavan until 2015 and then moved to Khoneh Be Khoneh for one season before retiring in 2016. He currently co-owns Malavan Club with Pejman Nouri.

=== Persepolis (2008-2009, 2010-2012) ===
- In 2008, he joined Persepolis FC, playing 30 matches and scoring 4 goals in his first season.
- After a brief period abroad, he re-signed with Persepolis in 2010, playing 59 league matches and scoring 6 goals until 2012.

=== Emirates Clubs (2009-2010) ===
- Zare joined Emirates Club in 2009, becoming a key player during the season. However, he had to leave the club after the arrival of Javad Kazemian.
- In 2010, he signed with Al Sharjah in the UAE.

Club performance			League		Cup		Continental		Total	
Season	Club	League	Apps	Goals	Apps	Goals	Apps	Goals	Apps	Goals
Iran			League		Hazfi Cup		Asia		Total	
2004–05	Malavan	Pro League	29	1	1	0	–		30	1
2005–06	Malavan	Pro League	25	1	1	1	–		26	2
2006–07	Malavan	Pro League	24	1	2	0	–		26	1
2007–08	Malavan	Pro League	27	4	1	0	–		28	4
2008–09	Persepolis	Pro League	30	4	2	1	5	1	37	6
United Arab Emirates			League		President's Cup		Asia		Total	
2009–10	Emirates	UAE League	13	2	6	0	–		19	2
2009–10	Al Sharjah	UAE League	4	0	0	0	–		4	0
Iran			League		Hazfi Cup		Asia		Total	
2010–11	Persepolis	Pro League	32	4	6	0	4	1	42	5
2011–12	Persepolis	Pro League	27	2	3	2	5	0	35	4
2012–13	Malavan	Pro League	26	3	1	0	–		27	3
2013–14	Malavan	Pro League	26	2	2	0	–		28	2
2014–15	Malavan	Pro League	24	1	1	0	–		25	1
2015–16	Malavan	Pro League	7	1	1	0	–		8	1
Total	Iran		270	25	20	4	14	2	304	29
Total	United Arab Emirates		17	2	6	0	0	0	23	2
Career total			294	27	27	4	14	2	335	31

- Assist Goals

Season	Team	Assists
05–06	Malavan	2
06–07	Malavan	0
07–08	Malavan	4
08–09	Persepolis	0
10–11	Persepolis	0
11–12	Persepolis	0
12–13	Malavan	1
13–14	Malavan	4
14–15	Malavan	0

== International career ==
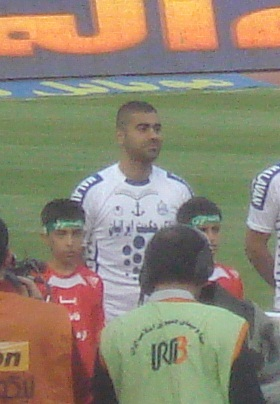
Zare before a match against his former side, Persepolis in Azadi Stadium

Zare was a member of Iran national under-23 football team in the 2006 Asian Games, where he scored a 30-yard strike for Iran. He was called up to the senior squad in June 2007 for the West Asian Football Federation Championship 2007 and made his debut for Iran in a match vs Iraq. He played in the 2010 FIFA World Cup qualification and 2011 AFC Asian Cup qualification for Team Melli.

He also was invited in June 2011 by Carlos Queiroz to participate in the 2014 FIFA World Cup qualification.

=== International goals ===
Scores and results list Iran's goal tally first.

#	Date	Venue	Opponent	Score	Result	Competition
1	2 January 2009	Azadi Stadium, Tehran	China	3–1	3–1	Friendly
2	9 January 2009	Azadi Stadium, Tehran	Singapore	4–0	6–0	2011 AFC Asian Cup qualification
3	23 March 2009	Kuwait National Stadium, Kuwait City	Kuwait	1–0	1–0	Friendly

== Managerial statistics ==
As of 24 July 2021

Team	From	To	Record							
Team	From	To	G	W	D	L	GF	GA	GD	Win %
Malavan	1 September 2020	Present	38	16	10	12	41	33	+8	42.11
Total			38	16	10	12	41	33	+8	42.11

== Personal life ==
On 9 February 2026, in the midst of the 2025–2026 Iranian protests, Zare publicly objected to being included on a list of supporters of the 1979 Islamic Revolution by the Ministry of Sport and Youth, ahead of the Revolution's anniversary.

== Honours ==
=== Player ===
Persepolis

- Hazfi Cup (1): 2010–11

=== Manager ===
Malavan

- Azadegan League (1): 2021–22
