= Mohammad Nouri (footballer) =

Iranian footballer (born 1983)

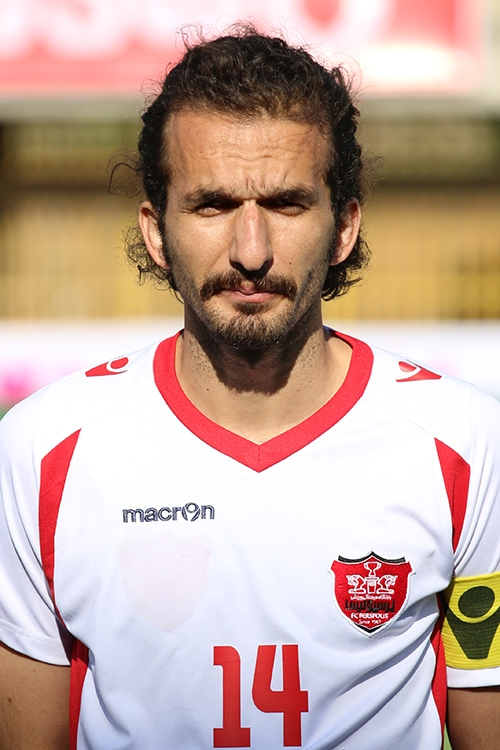
- Nouri before a match with Persepolis, 26 April 2015

Personal information
- Date of birth: 9 January 1983 (age 43)
- Place of birth: Sonqor, Kermanshah, Iran
- Height: 1.86 m (6 ft 1 in)
- Position: Attacking midfielder

Senior career*
Years	Team	Apps	(Gls)
2000–2005	Homa		
2005–2007	Sepahan	46	(6)
2007–2010	Saba Qom	80	(17)
2010–2015	Persepolis	138	(27)
2015–2016	Al-Mesaimeer	22	(1)
2016–2018	Tractor	37	(1)
2018–2020	Pars Jonoubi	64	(15)
2020–2021	Paykan	19	(0)

International career
2006	Iran U23	6	(0)
2008–2015	Iran	27	(4)

Managerial career
- 2022–2023: Zob Ahan (assistant)
- 2023–2024: Malavan (assistant)
- 2024–2025: Gol Gohar (assistant)
- 2025–2026: Sanat Naft (assistant)
- 2026: Sanat Naft
Medal record
Representing Iran
Asian Games
Bronze medal – third place	2006 Qatar	Team competition
West Asian Football Federation Championship
Gold medal – first place	2008 Iran	Team competition
- * Club domestic league appearances and goals

Mohammad Nouri (Persian: محمد نوری, born 9 January 1983) is an Iranian football coach and a former midfielder. He is an assistant coach with Gol Gohar.

== Club career ==
=== Early career ===
He started his professional career with Homa in 2000. He played five years for the club before moving to Sepahan in the summer of 2005. He moved to Saba in summer 2007 and stayed for three seasons.

=== Persepolis ===
He moved to Persepolis in the summer of 2010 and was used as attacking midfielder. He was top scorer of Persepolis in 2010–11 season. He extended his contract with Persepolis for another three years on 12 May 2012, keeping him in the team till 2015. Before the start of 2013–14 season, he was named as the club's captain after the departure of Ali Karimi and retirement of Mehdi Mahdavikia.

=== Mesaimeer ===
Nouri joined newly promoted Qatari club Mesaimeer in July 2015 on a one-year contract.

=== Pars Jonoubi ===
On 13 January 2018, Nouri officially joined Pars Jonoubi Jam.

=== Club career statistics ===
As of 4 April 2019.

Club	Division	Season	League		Hazfi Cup		Asia		Total	
Club	Division	Season	Apps	Goals	Apps	Goals	Apps	Goals	Apps	Goals
Sepahan	Pro League	2005–06	21	0	4	0	–	–	25	0
Sepahan	Pro League	2006–07	25	6	3	0	6	2	34	8
Saba	Pro League	2007–08	21	5	0	0	–	–	21	5
Saba	Pro League	2008–09	31	8	4	1	5	2	40	11
Saba	Pro League	2009–10	28	4	4	0	–	–	32	4
Persepolis	Pro League	2010–11	31	9	6	4	6	0	43	13
Persepolis	Pro League	2011–12	30	8	3	1	7	0	40	9
Persepolis	Pro League	2012–13	28	5	5	5	–	–	33	10
Persepolis	Pro League	2013–14	24	0	3	0	–	–	27	0
Persepolis	Pro League	2014–15	25	5	4	2	7	3	36	10
Al-Mesaimeer	Qatar Stars League	2015–16	22	1	0	0	–	–	22	1
Tractor	Pro League	2016–17	18	1	2	0	0	0	20	1
Pars Jam	Pro League	2017–18	10	2	0	0	–	–	16	2
Pars Jam	Pro League	2018–19	26	4	0	0	–	–	15	4
Pars Jam	Pro League	2019–20	28	8	0	0	–	–	17	8
Career totals			352	66	38	13	31	7	421	88

== International career ==
Mohammad Nouri was a member of Iran national under-23 football team, participating in the 2006 Asian Games.

He made his debut for the senior national team in a friendly match against Ghana in June 2008. He was previously called up to join the national team in June 2007 for the 2007 Asian Cup, but did not make an appearance.

=== International goals ===
Scores and results list Iran's goal tally first.

#	Date	Venue	Opponent	Score	Result	Competition
1	27 August 2008	Azadi Stadium, Tehran	Azerbaijan	1–0	1–0	Friendly
2	14 January 2009	Azadi Stadium, Tehran	Singapore	5–0	6–0	2011 AFC Asian Cup qualification
3	14 January 2009	Azadi Stadium, Tehran	Singapore	6–0	6–0	2011 AFC Asian Cup qualification
4	19 January 2011	Qatar SC Stadium, Doha	United Arab Emirates	2–0	3–0	2011 AFC Asian Cup

== Honours ==
Sepahan

- Hazfi Cup: 2005–06, 2006–07
- Hazfi Cup: 2010–11, 2012–13

Iran U23

- Asian Games Bronze Medal: 2006
