= Silas (footballer, born 1985) =

Brazilian footballer

Personal information
- Full name: Silas Feitosa Jose de Souza
- Date of birth: 8 March 1985 (age 41)
- Place of birth: São Bernardo do Campo, Brazil
- Position: Defender

Team information
- Current team: São Bernardo

Senior career*
Years	Team	Apps	(Gls)
2007–2008	Santacruzense	?	(2)
2008	Tupi		
2008–2009	Bahia	4	(0)
2009–2010	Guarani		
2010	Gostaresh Foolad	5	(0)
2010–2011	Bragantino	11	(1)
2011–	São Bernardo	15	(0)
- * Club domestic league appearances and goals as of 21:40, 13 January 2012 (UTC)

Silas Feitosa Jose De Souza (born March 8, 1985) known as Silas, is a Brazilian footballer who plays for São Bernardo. He formerly played for clubs including Gostaresh Foolad F.C.

== Club career ==
De Souza joined Gostaresh Foolad F.C. in 2010, and scored the second goal for the club in their Hazfi Cup semifinal victory over Zob Ahan F.C. He then returned to Brazil where he played for Bragantino in Série B and for São Bernardo in the Campeonato Paulista.

Club performance			League		Cup		Continental		Total	
Season	Club	League	Apps	Goals	Apps	Goals	Apps	Goals	Apps	Goals
Iran			League		Hazfi Cup		Asia		Total	
2009–10	Gostaresh Foolad	Azadegan League	5	0	2	1	-	-	7	1
Total	Iran		5	0	3	1	0	0	8	1
Career total			5	0	3	1	0	0	8	1
