= Rodriguinho (footballer, born 1980) =

Brazilian footballer

Personal information
- Full name: Rodrigo Antônio Lopes Belchior
- Date of birth: March 7, 1980 (age 46)
- Place of birth: Brasília, DF, Brazil
- Height: 1.85 m (6 ft 1 in)
- Position: Forward

Team information
- Current team: Luziânia

Senior career*
Years	Team	Apps	(Gls)
1997–2006	Gama		
1998	→Samambaia (loan)		
1999	→Anapolina (loan)		
2005	→Paysandu (loan)		
2006–2009	Brasiliense		
2008	→Ipatinga (loan)		
2009	→Sertãozinho(loan)		
2010	Rah Ahan		
2011	Parseh		
2012	Anapolina		
2012–2013	Sampaio Corrêa		
2013	Ceilândia		
2013–2014	Rio Branco		
2014–2015	Luziânia		
2015	Farroupilha		
2015–2016	Gama		
2016–	Luziânia		
- * Club domestic league appearances and goals as of 3 May 2016

Rodrigo Antônio Lopes Belchior (born March 7, 1980) is a Brazilian footballer who plays for Rah Ahan F.C. in the Iran Pro League. He is married and has two children.

== Club career ==
Club performance			League		Cup		Continental		Total	
Season	Club	League	Apps	Goals	Apps	Goals	Apps	Goals	Apps	Goals
Iran			League		Hazfi Cup		Asia		Total	
2010–2011	Rah Ahan	Persian Gulf Cup	0	0	1	0	—	—	1	0
Total	Iran		0	0	1	0	0	0	1	0
Career total			0	0	1	0	0	0	1	0
