= Hüseyin Atalay =

Turkish footballer

Hüseyin
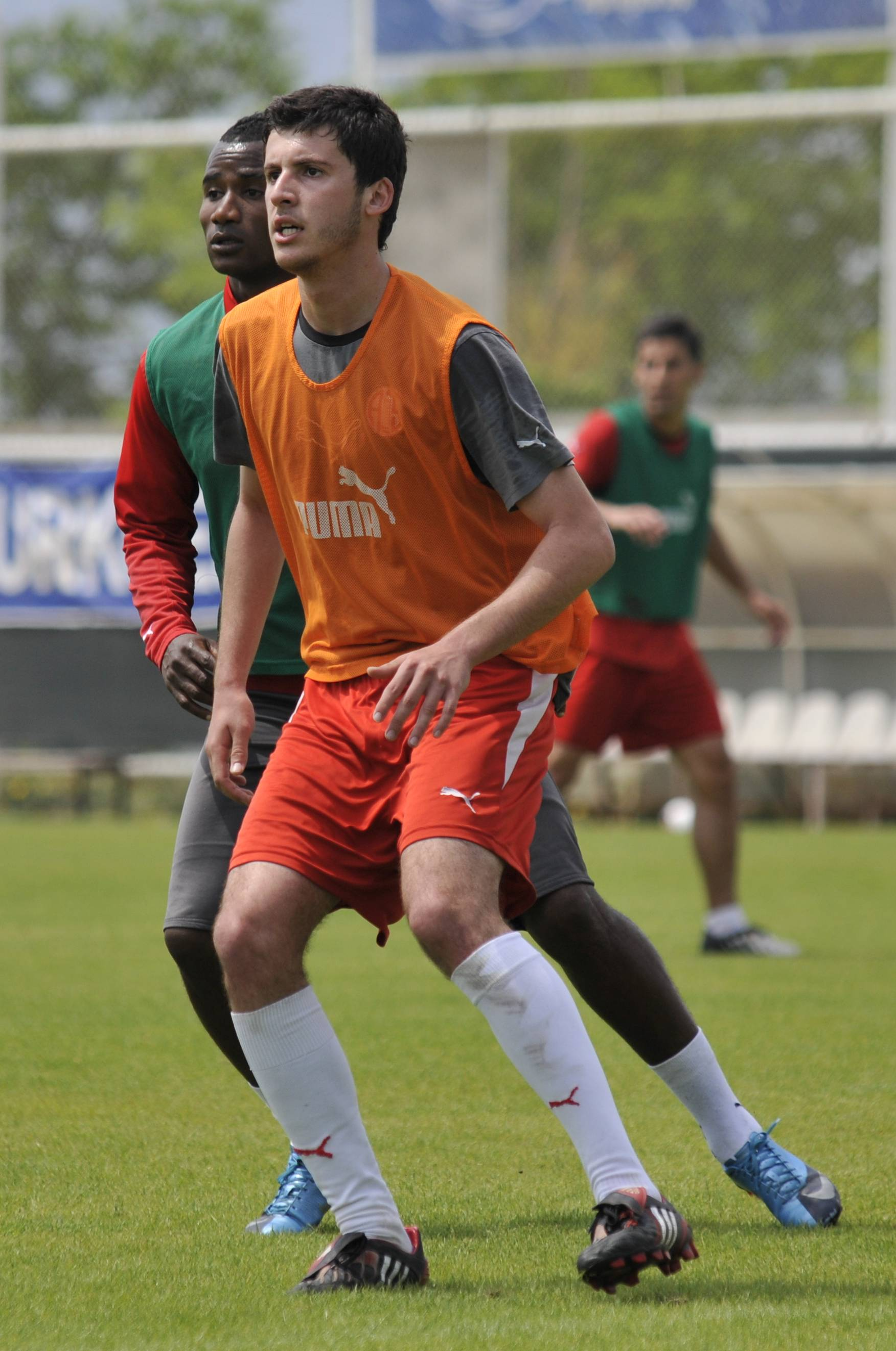
- Hüseyin Atalay in 2009

Personal information
- Full name: Hüseyin Atalay
- Date of birth: 27 October 1991 (age 35)
- Place of birth: Antalya, Turkey
- Height: 1.71 m (5 ft 7 in)
- Position: Midfielder

Team information
- Current team: Bursa Yıldırımspor

Senior career*
Years	Team	Apps	(Gls)
2008–2015	Antalyaspor	7	(0)
2012–2013	→ Denizlispor (loan)	29	(0)
2013–2014	→ Karşıyaka SK (loan)	26	(3)
2015	→ Denizlispor (loan)	10	(0)
2015–2017	Fethiyespor	56	(3)
2017–2018	Tuzlaspor	14	(0)
2018–2019	Kızılcabölükspor	24	(1)
2019–2020	Kemerspor 2003	21	(6)
2020–	Bursa Yıldırımspor	0	(0)
- * Club domestic league appearances and goals as of 8 March 2020

Hüseyin Atalay (born 27 October 1991) is a Turkish footballer who plays as a midfielder for Bursa Yıldırımspor.
