= Omid Nezamipour =

Iranian footballer

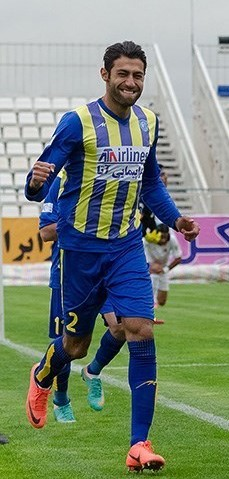

Personal information
- Full name: Omid Nezamipour
- Date of birth: January 11, 1986 (age 40)
- Place of birth: Tehran, Iran
- Position: Right back

Team information
- Current team: Pars Jonoubi
- Number: 2

Senior career*
Years	Team	Apps	(Gls)
–2010	Gostaresh Foolad		
2010–2012	Malavan	11	(0)
2012–2016	Gostaresh Foolad	74	(2)
2016–2017	Khoneh Be Khoneh	14	(0)
2017	Saba Qom	5	(1)
2017–2018	Baadraan	12	(0)
2018–	Pars Jonoubi	8	(0)
- * Club domestic league appearances and goals as of 7 Sep 2017

Omid Nezamipour is an Iranian football midfielder who currently plays for Iranian football club Pars Jonoubi in the Persian Gulf Pro League.
