= Sepehr Heydari =

Iranian footballer

Personal information
- Full name: Sepehr Heydari Chaharlang
- Date of birth: 14 December 1980 (age 45)
- Place of birth: Esfahan, Iran
- Height: 1.88 m (6 ft 2 in)
- Position: Centre back

Youth career
- 1990–2000: Zob Ahan

Senior career*
Years	Team	Apps	(Gls)
2000–2007	Zob Ahan	128	(10)
2007–2011	Persepolis	122	(11)
2011–2012	Mes Kerman	31	(1)
2012–2014	Zob Ahan	47	(3)
Total		328	(25)

International career^{‡}
2007–2009	Iran	3	(0)
- * Club domestic league appearances and goals as of 24 August 2012 ‡ National team caps and goals as of 30 December 2009

Sepehr Heydari Chaharlang (Persian: سپهر حیدری چهار لنگ; born 14 December 1980), known as Sepehr Heydari, is a retired Iranian football defender.

== Early life and education ==
Sepehr Heydari Chaharlang was born on 14 December 1980 in Esfahan, Iran.

He has a bachelor of mechanical engineering from Najaf Abad Azad University.

== Club career ==
Heydari started to show his talent in Zob Ahan and finally moved to Persepolis. The 2007/08 season was his first season at Persepolis and head coach Afshin Ghotbi believed in him so much that Heidari played in all matches except one, for which he received a suspension. He scored the most important goal of his career in the 96th minute against Sepahan on the final day of the season which won the league for Persepolis after six years.

During the 2008/09 season he was once again put in the starting line up by Afshin Ghotbi but when Ghotbi resigned and Peyrovani took over, Heidari was replaced and played as substitute for some time before being put back in the starting eleven for the AFC Champions League by new coach Nelo Vingada. He extended his contract with Persepolis for two more years in July 2009. He continued as being one of the regular players for 2009–10 season and had good scoring stats for the season. He became captain of Persepolis in January 2011. He won the Hazfi Cup in 2011 with Persepolis, but after the managerial changes the new coach Hamid Estili announced that he did not need Heydari.

Heydari joined Mes Kerman on 6 July 2011.

=== Club career statistics ===
As of 24 August 2014

Club performance			League		Cup		Continental		Total	
Season	Club	League	Apps	Goals	Apps	Goals	Apps	Goals	Apps	Goals
Iran			League		Hazfi Cup		Asia		Total	
2000–01	Zob Ahan	Azadegan League	0	0	0	0	-	-	0	0
2001–02	Zob Ahan	Pro League	5	0	0	0	-	-	5	0
2002–03	Zob Ahan	Pro League	20	1	2	0	-	-	22	1
2003–04	Zob Ahan	Pro League	18	0	0	0	5	0	18	0
2004–05	Zob Ahan	Pro League	29	5	1	0	-	-	30	5
2005–06	Zob Ahan	Pro League	27	1	0	0	-	-	27	1
2006–07	Zob Ahan	Pro League	29	3	0	0	-	-	29	3
2007–08	Persepolis	Pro League	33	3	3	0	-	-	36	3
2008–09	Persepolis	Pro League	30	1	3	0	6	0	39	1
2009–10	Persepolis	Pro League	31	4	6	0	-	-	37	4
2010–11	Persepolis	Pro League	28	3	4	1	4	0	36	4
2011–12	Mes Kerman	Pro League	31	1	2	0	-	-	33	1
2012–13	Zob Ahan	Pro League	28	2	2	1	-	-	30	3
2013–14	Zob Ahan	Pro League	19	1	3	0	-	-	22	1
Career total			328	25	26	2	15	0	369	27

- Assist Goals

Season	Team	Assists
05-06	Zob Ahan	0
06-07	Zob Ahan	1
07-08	Persepolis	2
08-09	Persepolis	1
09-10	Persepolis	0
10-11	Persepolis	1
11-12	Mes Kerman	2

== International career ==
He shows some good performances but has not got a spot in the first eleven. He was invited to Team Melli by Afshin Ghotbi in January 2010 and played against Mali.

== Personal life ==
His father Siavash was striker of Zob Ahan in Takht Jamshid Cup.

== Honours ==
- Iran's Premier Football League
  - Winner: 1
    - 2007/08 with Persepolis
  - Runner up: 1
    - 2004/05 with Zob Ahan
- Hazfi Cup
  - Winner: 3
    - 2002/03 with Zob Ahan
    - 2009/10 with Persepolis
    - 2010/11 with Persepolis
