= Makan Dembélé =

Malian footballer

Personal information
- Date of birth: December 25, 1986 (age 39)
- Place of birth: Bamako, Mali
- Height: 1.93 m (6 ft 4 in)
- Position: Striker

Team information
- Current team: AS Police de Bamako
- Number: 9

Senior career*
Years	Team	Apps	(Gls)
2005–2006	USFAS Bamako	20	(11)
2006–2007	Gostaresh Foolad	23	(16)
2007–2008	Raja CA	0	(0)
2008–2009	Aboomoslem	26	(18)
2009–2012	Shahrdari Bandar Abbas	31	(21)
2012–2013	JS Kabylie	16	(9)
2013–2014	USFAS BAMAKO	25	(16)
2014–2015	AS Police	28	(17)

International career
2006–2009	U-23	7	(4)
- * Club domestic league appearances and goals

Makan Dembélé (25 December 1986) is a Malian footballer who plays for USFAS Bamako in Malian Première Division.

== Club career ==
On January 1, 2012, Dembélé signed for Algerian club JS Kabylie. On January 31, 2012, he made his debut for the club as a 77th-minute substitute in a league game against CA Batna.
