= Mohammad Mansouri =

Iranian Football Midfielder (born 1983)

Personal information
- Full name: Mohammad Mansouri Fahim
- Date of birth: 26 October 1983 (age 43)
- Place of birth: Tehran, Iran
- Height: 1.85 m (6 ft 1 in)
- Position: Left winger

Senior career*
Years	Team	Apps	(Gls)
2003–2008	Aboumoslem	58	(5)
2008–2012	Persepolis	55	(2)
2012–2015	Zob Ahan	11	(1)
2012–2013	→ Aboumoslem (loan)	19	(6)
2013–2014	→ Padideh (loan)	10	(0)
- * Club domestic league appearances and goals as of 10 May 2013 ‡ National team caps and goals as of 5 September 2009

Mohammad Mansouri Fahim (Persian: محمد منصوری فهیم, born 26 October 1983) is an Iranian football midfielder who plays for Padideh Shandiz in Azadegan League on loan from Zob Ahan.

== Club career ==
He spent several seasons in Aboumoslem, moved to Persepolis in summer 2008, and was used as a substitute during his first season.

=== Club career statistics ===
As of 10 May 2013

Club performance			League		Cup		Continental		Total	
Season	Club	League	Apps	Goals	Apps	Goals	Apps	Goals	Apps	Goals
Iran			League		Hazfi Cup		Asia		Total	
2003–04	Aboumoslem	Pro League		0			–			
2004–05	Aboumoslem	Pro League	11	1			–			
2005–06	Aboumoslem	Pro League	23	1			–			
2006–07	Aboumoslem	Pro League	27	1			–			
2007–08	Aboumoslem	Pro League	26	2	2	0	–		28	2
2008–09	Persepolis	Pro League	26	1	3	0	3	0	32	1
2009–10	Persepolis	Pro League	10	0	2	0	–		12	0
2010–11	Persepolis	Pro League	12	1	1	0	1	0	14	1
2011–12	Persepolis	Pro League	7	0	3	0	0	0	10	0
Career total				7			4	0		

- Assist Goals

Season	Team	Assists
05–06	Aboumoslem	0
06–07	Aboumoslem	0
07–08	Aboumoslem	4
08–09	Persepolis	1
09–10	Persepolis	1
10–11	Persepolis	1
11–12	Persepolis	0

== International career ==
He was called up for Team melli by Amir Ghalenoei in 2007 but never played any match. He also was invited in June 2011 by Carlos Queiroz.

== Honours ==
- Hazfi Cup
  - Winner: 2
    - 2009–10 with Persepolis
    - 2010–11 with Persepolis
