= Alireza Mohammad =

Iranian footballer

Personal information
- Full name: Alireza Mohammad
- Date of birth: 14 July 1981 (age 45)
- Place of birth: Iran
- Height: 1.75 m (5 ft 9 in)
- Positions: Right back; right wing back

Youth career
- Fajr Sepah Tehran
- Paykan

Senior career*
Years	Team	Apps	(Gls)
2003–2005	Shahab Zanjan		
2005–2008	Rah Ahan	84	(5)
2008–2012	Persepolis	96	(1)
2012–2013	Gahar Zagros	10	(0)
2013	Zob Ahan	7	(0)
2013–2014	Paykan	16	(1)
2014–2015	F.C. Khooneh Be Khooneh	?	(?)
2015–2016	Rah Ahan Yazdan F.C.	6	(0)

International career^{‡}
2009	Iran	3	(0)
- * Club domestic league appearances and goals as of 1 August 2014 ‡ National team caps and goals as of 5 September 2009

Alireza Mohammad (Persian: علیرضا محمد, born 14 July 1981 in mazandaran, Iran) is a former Iranian football defender who is currently coach of Persepolis youth U-16 team.

On 11 June 2008, Mohammad signed a two-year deal with Iran Pro League champions Persepolis as a player.

== Club career ==
Making both his club and cup debut with Rah Ahan Tehran F.C, he then signed with Persepolis F.C

After signing with Persepolis, he became a starter from the outset under head coach Afshin Ghotbi. He retained his place in the starting lineup under successive managers Afshin Peyrovani and Nelo Vingada, featuring regularly in both the league and AFC Champions League. He was noted by his dribbling ability, pace, and tendency to make deep runs on the right flank, qualities that contributed to his 9-year career.

=== Club career statistics ===
As of 11 May 2012

Club performance			League		Cup		Continental		Total	
Season	Club	League	Apps	Goals	Apps	Goals	Apps	Goals	Apps	Goals
Iran			League		Hazfi Cup		Asia		Total	
2003–04	Shahab Zanjan	Division 1					–			
2004–05	Shahab Zanjan	Division 1					–			
2005–06	Rah Ahan	Pro League	28	2			–		28	2
2006–07	Rah Ahan	Pro League	25	0			–		25	0
2007–08	Rah Ahan	Pro League	31	3	3	0	–		34	3
2008–09	Persepolis	Pro League	31	0	3	0	6	0	40	0
2009–10	Persepolis	Pro League	26	0	6	0	–		32	0
2010–11	Persepolis	Pro League	22	0	5	0	2	0	29	0
2011–12	Persepolis	Pro League	17	1	1	0	0	0	18	1
Career total			180	6	18	0	8	0	206	6

- Assist Goals

Season	Team	Assists
05–06	Rah Ahan	1
06–07	Rah Ahan	0
07–08	Rah Ahan	3
08–09	Persepolis	1
09–10	Persepolis	2
10–11	Persepolis	1
11–12	Persepolis	0

== International career ==
Mohammads first international appearance was made in a friendly against China on 1 June 2009, when he came on as a substitute at half time for Ehsan Hajsafi under coach Afshin Ghotbi.

== Honours ==
- Hazfi Cup
  - Winner: 2
    - 2009/10 with Persepolis
    - 2010/11 with Persepolis
