= Mehdi Shiri =

Iranian footballer (born 1978)

Personal information
- Full name: Mehdi Shiri
- Date of birth: 14 May 1978 (age 48)
- Place of birth: Shiraz, Iran
- Height: 1.75 m (5 ft 9 in)
- Position: Midfielder

Youth career
- Bargh Shiraz

Senior career*
Years	Team	Apps	(Gls)
1999–2003	Bargh Shiraz	47	(16)
2003–2004	Esteghlal Ahvaz	17	(0)
2004–2005	Esteghlal	13	(0)
2005–2006	Bargh Shiraz	27	(4)
2006–2007	Saba Battery	19	(0)
2007–2009	Bargh Shiraz	51	
2009–2011	Persepolis	25	(0)
2011–2013	Gostaresh Foolad	40	(7)
2013	→ Bargh Shiraz (loan)	7	(2)
2013–2014	Esteghlal Ahvaz	10	(3)
2015–2015	Bargh Shiraz	15	(7)
2015–2017	Qashqai	30	(11)

International career
2000–2001	Iran	2	(0)

Managerial career
- 2015–2017: FC Qashqai (player-manager)
- 2013–2014: Esteghlal Ahvaz (player-manager)
- 2015: Bargh Shiraz (player-manager)
- 2017–2019: Bargh Shiraz
- 2019: Iran Students
- * Club domestic league appearances and goals as of 10 May 2013

Mehdi Shiri (Persian: مهدی شیری; born 14 May 1978 in Shiraz, Iran) is an Iranian football midfielder who played for and managed Bargh Shiraz in 2013. His younger brother, Mojtaba is also a footballer who played for Pas Hamedan.

== Club career ==
He was one of the most talented players for Bargh and moved to Esteghlal and was mostly used as a substitute and moved back a season after to Bargh. He moved to Saba and again moved back to Bargh a season after again. He moved to Persepolis in June 2009.

=== Club career statistics ===
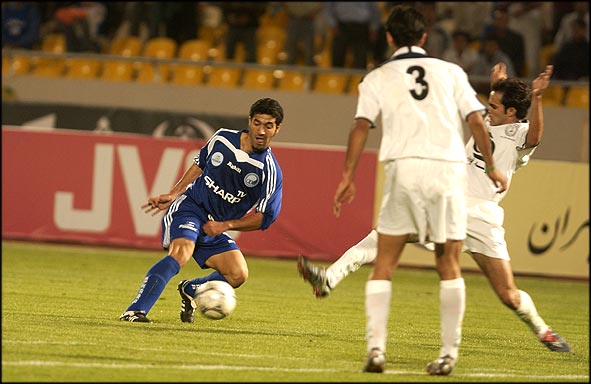
Shiri with Esteghlal in action during the match against Pas, October 2004

Last updated 10 May 2013

Club performance			League		Cup		Continental		Total	
Season	Club	League	Apps	Goals	Apps	Goals	Apps	Goals	Apps	Goals
Iran			League		Hazfi Cup		Asia		Total	
1999–00	Bargh	Division 2		3			-	-		
2000–01	Bargh	Division 2		4			-	-		
2001–02	Bargh	Pro League		5			-	-		
2002–03	Bargh	Pro League		4			-	-		
2003–04	Esteghlal Ahvaz	Pro League	17	0			-	-		
2004–05	Esteghlal	Pro League	13	0			-	-		
2005–06	Bargh	Pro League	27	4			-	-		
2006–07	Saba Battery	Pro League	19	0			-	-		
2007–08	Bargh	Pro League	32	5	3	0	-	-	35	5
2008–09	Bargh	Pro League	20	5			-	-		
2009–10	Persepolis	Pro League	14	0	2	0	-	-	16	0
2010–11	Persepolis	Pro League	11	0	1	0	2	0	14	0
2013–14	Esteghlal Ahvaz	Division 2	0	0	0	0	-	-	0	0
Total	Iran				28		2	0		
Career total					28		2	0		

- Assist Goals

Season	Team	Assists
05–06	Bargh	6
06–07	Saba Battery	0
07–08	Bargh	7
08–09	Bargh	7
09–10	Persepolis	4
10–11	Persepolis	0

== International career ==
Shiri has had only one appearance for Team Melli in the 2001 LG cup in Egypt when he came on as a substitute against Canada.

== Honors ==
=== Club ===
Persepolis

- Hazfi Cup
  - Winner: 2009–10, 2010–11

=== As a manager ===
Qashqai F.C.

- Iran Football's 3rd Division Champion Group C: 2015–16, promotion to Second Division.
