= Afshin Ghotbi =

Iranian football coach (born 1964)

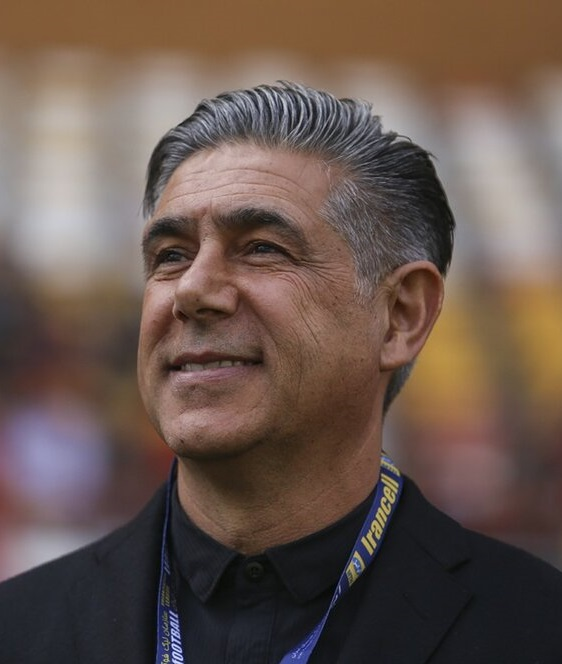
- Ghotbi as manager of Foolad in 2019

Personal information
- Date of birth: 8 February 1964 (age 62)
- Place of birth: Tehran, Imperial State of Iran

College career
Years	Team	Apps	(Gls)
1981–1985	UCLA Bruins		

Managerial career
- 1984–1988: UCLA Bruins women
- 1988–2001: Global Soccer School
- 1988–1991: La Cañada Spartans
- 1997: San Fernando Valley
- 1997–1998: United States (assistant)
- 2000–2002: South Korea (assistant)
- 2002–2004: Suwon Bluewings (assistant)
- 2004–2005: Los Angeles Galaxy (assistant)
- 2005–2007: South Korea (assistant)
- 2007–2008: Persepolis
- 2009–2011: Iran
- 2011–2014: Shimizu S-Pulse
- 2015–2016: Curaçao (assistant)
- 2016: Buriram United
- 2016–2018: Shijiazhuang Ever Bright
- 2018–2019: Foolad
- 2019–2021: Cangzhou Mighty Lions
- 2022–2025: Vancouver FC

Afshin Ghotbi (Persian: افشین قطبی, born 8 February 1964) is an Iranian-American football coach.

== Early life ==
Ghotbi was born in Tehran. He is the son of a teacher in Iran with whom he left Iran at the age of 13 after his father remarried and moved to Los Angeles, where he has been a resident for more than two decades. He received his BSc qualification in Electrical Engineering from UCLA where he was a member of the soccer team.

== Career ==
=== Early years ===
Prior to coaching at the professional level, Ghotbi founded one of the best youth football academies named AGSS in Southern California, responsible for the discovery and development of players such as Peter Vagenas and John O'Brien and many more.

=== United States ===
Ghotbi became assistant manager of the United States men's national soccer team (USMNT) from 1997 to 1998, working under Steve Sampson. He also participated in the USMNT squad for 1998 FIFA World Cup, where he had an emotional moment as his adopted country he worked played against Iran, the country of his origin.

=== LA Galaxy ===
Afshin Ghotbi served as an assistant coach under Steve Sampson at LA Galaxy, contributing to the club’s historic MLS double in 2005. This achievement marked the only occasion in the club’s history, and one of only two instances in Major League Soccer history, where a team won both the MLS Cup and the Supporters’ Shield in the same season.

=== South Korea ===
Ghotbi worked for Korea Republic national team under Dutchman Guus Hiddink from December 2000 until July 2002 as a football analyst. He continued his journey in Korea by taking the role of an assistant coach of Samsung Bluewings from 2002 to 2004. He returned to Korean National Team, as an assistant coach under Dick Advocaat from October 2005 until July 2006. He continued as an assistant coach for Korea under Dutch head coach Pim Verbeek, who he knew back in 2000 as part of South Korea's 2002 World Cup preparation, from July 2006 until July 2007.

=== Persepolis ===
In August 2007, Afshin Ghotbi was appointed head coach of Persepolis F.C., one of Iran’s most prominent clubs. During his tenure, fans affectionately nicknamed him "The Emperor" in recognition of his leadership and influence.

In February 2008, Ghotbi was shortlisted for the Iran national football team coaching position, although the role went to Ali Daei. He led Persepolis to the Iranian Pro League championship in May 2008.

Ghotbi was re-appointed as head coach on 3 July 2008, signing a two-year contract in an official meeting in Dubai. He resigned on 19 November 2008.

=== Iran national team ===
After just three weeks after being announced as manager, Mayeli Kohan became the spearhead of a heated dispute between himself and Esteghlal F.C. manager Amir Ghalenoei. This resulted in the IRIFF forcing Mayeli Kohan's resignation as manager of Team Melli. A week later, Ghotbi agreed to succeed Mayeli Kohan as head coach of the Iranian national football team, becoming the first American to take the job. After this appointment, Ghotbi said in an interview "A life dream, a longtime ambition and a journey written in the stars is about to be realized I have to thank all the people around the world who have cheered, supported and inspired me to have this opportunity", Despite conceding only one goal and earning five points in three matches, Iran fell short and failed to qualify for the 2010 FIFA World Cup.

He continued to coach Team Melli in 2011 AFC Asian Cup qualification where they won three matches out of four and lost the other one to Jordan away and in which the team earned 13 points and qualified as the group leaders. Following some positive results in friendlies (such as winning against Bosnia-Herzegovina, China, and South Korea in their land and winning 8 matches in a row in 2010), Iran qualified for the Asian Cup in Qatar. Later on he finished second in 2010 WAFF Championship. Iran was the only team in the AFC Asian Cup competition to win all three group matches beating Iraq, North Korea and United Emirates with scoring six goals and conceding one. Iran reached the quarter-finals but lost to South Korea by a goal from Yoon Bit-garam in extra time after a 0–0 regulation result.

=== Shimizu S-Pulse ===
After the Asian Cup, Ghotbi signed three-year contract with Japan's J. League Division 1 side Shimizu S-Pulse. He led the team for the end of 2011 season which ended in the tenth rank. In his second season at the club, his team started the league very successfully but later on they lost their form and finished the league in 9th place with one progress. They also reached the final game of J. League Cup but lost 1–2 to Kashima Antlers. On 30 July 2014, Ghotbi left Shimizu by mutual contest after leaving the club at the 12th place.

During his 3.5-year tenure in the J.League, Ghotbi managed one of the youngest squads in the league’s history, focusing on the development of Japanese players, securing the signing of former Arsenal and Sweden international Freddie Ljungberg, and overseeing high-profile transfers including Eddy Bosnar and Alex Brosque.

=== Buriram United ===
On 24 May 2016, Thai League T1 side Buriram United made an announcement of the appointments of Ghotbi. He became the first Asian American foreign head coach of the club. On 28 May, Ghotbi made his managerial debut for Buriram United in a domestic league game against Nakhon Ratchasima and collected the win with 1–0 result. On 21 August, his contract was terminated after three months in charge.

=== Shijiazhuang Ever Bright ===
Ghotbi was appointed by China League One team Shijiazhuang Ever Bright in November 2016. In the 2017 season, the team finished third. After being dismissed in 2018, he returned for a second spell in July 2019. He led the team to promotion into the Chinese Super League that year. He left by mutual consent in September 2021.

As head coach of Shijiazhuang Ever Bright, he became the first Iranian-American coach to achieve promotion to the Chinese Super League, leading the club during one of its most successful periods.

=== Vancouver FC ===
In November 2022, Ghotbi was named the first head coach of Canadian Premier League expansion side Vancouver FC. In his first two seasons as head coach, the club finished in seventh place out of eight. On 8 July 2025, following a 5–4 quarter-final win on penalties over Cavalry FC while under the helm of Ghotbi, Vancouver FC advanced to the semi-finals of the Canadian Championship for the first time in their history. On 23 July 2025, Ghotbi and the club departed by mutual agreement. The club sat in last place in the CPL at the time, with only 8 points through 15 matches played.

In December 2025, Ghotbi sued Vancouver FC's ownership group, for failure to repay a $500,000 loan he had given to the club in July 2023.

== Managerial statistics ==
As of 23 July 2025

Team	From	To	Record							
Team	From	To	G	W	D	L	GF	GA	GD	Win %
(United States) San Fernando Valley	1997	1997	18	9	7	2	30	31	−1	50.00
(Iran) Persepolis	27 July 2007	18 November 2008	51	26	15	10	88	59	+29	50.98
Iran	22 April 2009	22 January 2011	30	16	6	8	39	27	+12	53.33
(Japan) Shimizu S-Pulse	1 February 2011	30 July 2014	146	59	29	58	219	198	+21	40.41
(Thailand) Buriram United	24 May 2016	20 August 2016	22	12	7	3	61	28	+33	54.55
(China) Shijiazhuang Ever Bright	7 November 2016	1 November 2018	51	25	19	7	80	55	+25	49.02
(Iran) Foolad	1 December 2018	1 June 2019	16	6	5	5	17	21	−4	37.50
(China) Cangzhou Mighty Lions	20 July 2019	6 September 2021	65	25	13	27	60	72	−12	38.46
(Canada) Vancouver FC	2 November 2022	23 July 2025	76	16	22	38	74	128	−54	21.05
Career totals			475	194	123	158	668	619	+49	40.84

Note: Penalty shoot-outs are counted as draws

== Honours ==
Persepolis

- Iran Pro League: 2007–08

Shimizu S-Pulse

- J. League Cup runner-up: 2012

Shijiazhuang Ever Bright

- China League One runner-up: 2019
- China League One promotion: 2019

Individual

- Iran Football Federation Award
  - Manager of the Year (2007–08), Persepolis

Awards and achievements
Preceded by Ali Daei	Iran Pro League Winning Manager; 2007–08	Succeeded by Amir Ghalenoei
