= 2009–10 Persepolis F.C. season =

Persepolis
2009-10 season
- Chairman: Abbas Ansarifard (until Oct 2009); Habib Kashani
- Manager: Zlatko Kranjčar (first 21 weeks); Ali Daei
- Persian Gulf Cup: 4th
- Hazfi Cup: Winners
- Top goalscorer: League: Karim Bagheri (10); All: Karim Bagheri (13)
- Highest home attendance: 100,000 v Gostaresh Foolad (24 May 2010)
- Lowest home attendance: 20,000 v Sepahan (18 May 2010)
- Average home league attendance: 40,000
Home colours	Away colours	Third colours

The 2009–10 season was Persepolis's 9th season in the Gulf Cup, and their 27th consecutive season in the top division of Iranian football. They also compete in the Hazfi Cup.

== Squad ==
=== Iran Pro League ===
Note: Flags indicate national team as defined under FIFA eligibility rules; some limited exceptions apply. Players may hold more than one non-FIFA nationality.

No.	Pos.	Nation	Player
1	GK	IRI	Misagh Memarzadeh
2	DF	IRI	Alireza Mohammad
3	DF	IRI	Sepehr Heidari (3rd captain)
4	DF	IRI	Mojtaba Shiri
5	DF	IRI	Nabiollah Bagheriha
6	MF	IRI	Karim Bagheri (captain)
7	MF	IRI	Mohammad Parvin
8	FW	GER	Shpejtim Arifi
9	FW	IRI	Mohsen Khalili
10	MF	IRI	Maysam Baou
11	MF	IRI	Hossein Badamaki
13	DF	IRI	Sheys Rezaei (Vice-captain)
14	MF	IRI	Saman Aghazamani
16	MF	IRI	Mohammad Mansouri

No.	Pos.	Nation	Player
17	DF	IRI	Jalal Akbari
18	DF	IRI	Ebrahim Shakouri
20	GK	IRI	Alireza Haghighi
21	MF	IRQ	Hawar Mulla Mohammed
22	MF	IRI	Mohammad Mehdi Elhaei
24	FW	IRI	Hadi Norouzi
25	MF	IRI	Mehdi Shiri
26	MF	IRI	Hamidreza Aliasgari
27	MF	BRA	Tiago Alves Fraga
28	FW	BRA	Wésley Brasilia
29	MF	IRI	Mehran Farziat
30	FW	IRI	Mojtaba Zarei
33	GK	IRI	Mohammad Hossein Naeiji
40	MF	IRI	Adel Kolahkaj

== Persian Gulf Cup ==
=== Matches ===
Date Round	Home	Score	Away	Location

6 August 2009 1	Mes Kerman	3 – 3	Persepolis	Kerman
	Edinho 36', 82'; R. Bigdeli 55'; A. Yousefi (red card) 77'	3-3	H. Norouzi 36', 42'; Sh. Rezaei 80' (pen.)	Stadium: Shahid Bahonar Stadium; Attendance: 10,000; Referee: Saeed Mozaffari Zadeh

14 August 2009 2	Persepolis	1 – 1	Esteghlal Ahvaz	Tehran
	S. Heydari 83'	1-1	E. Sharifat 85'	Stadium: Azadi Stadium; Attendance: NA; Referee: Yadollah Jahanbazi

20 August 2009 3	Pas	1 – 2	Persepolis	Hamedan
	H. Asghari 50'	1-2	M. Parvin 75'; H. Norouzi 89'	Stadium: Qods Stadium; Attendance: 15,000; Referee: Masoud Moradi

28 August 2009 4	Persepolis	1 – 0	Saba	Tehran
	K. Bagheri 80'; J. Akbari (yellow card) (yellow-red card)	1-0		Stadium: Azadi Stadium; Attendance: 55,000; Referee: Khodadad Afsharian

7 September 2009 5	Zob Ahan	1 – 1	Persepolis	Fuladshahr
	M. Hosseini 58'	1-1	K. Bagheri 53'	Stadium: Fuladshahr Stadium; Attendance: 15,000; Referee: Alireza Faghani

14 September 2009 6	Persepolis	2 – 2	Shahin Bushehr	Tehran
	H. Norouzi 18'; K. Bagheri 89'	2-2	M. Ahmadpouri 21'; A. Bazyari 89'	Stadium: Azadi Stadium; Attendance: 55,000; Referee: Touraj Haghverdi

20 September 2009 7	Rah Ahan	2 – 2	Persepolis	Tehran
	M. Noormohammadi 45+1'; M. Zeneyedpour 79'	2-2	K. Bagheri 52'; W. Brasilia 90+5'	Stadium: Azadi Stadium; Attendance: 50,000; Referee: Ahmad Salehi

25 September 2009 8	Persepolis	1 – 2	Paykan	Tehran
	M. Baou 75'	1-2	M. Tahmasebi 17'; A. Ghorbani 61'	Stadium: Azadi Stadium; Attendance: 50,000; Referee: Mahmoud Rafiei

2 October 2009 9	Esteghlal	1 – 1	Persepolis	Tehran
	F. Majidi 55'	1-1	A. Kolahkaj 49'	Stadium: Azadi Stadium; Attendance: 100,000; Referee: Mohsen Torky

6 October 2009 10	Persepolis	4 – 2	Moghavemat Sepasi	Tehran
	K. Bagheri 12'; H. Norouzi 54'; M. Baou 81'; H. Mulla Mohammed 85'	4-2	B. Afsheh 88'; M. Nazari 90+1'	Stadium: Azadi Stadium; Attendance: 20,000; Referee: Saeid Bakhshizadeh

11 October 2009 11	Foolad	0 – 0	Persepolis	Ahvaz
		0-0		Stadium: Takhti Stadium; Attendance: 13,000; Referee: Mohsen Ghahremani

16 October 2009 12	Persepolis	1 – 1	Malavan	Tehran
	H. Mulla Mohammed 87' (pen.)	1-1	M. Heidari 45'; S. Salarzadeh (red card) 88'	Stadium: Azadi Stadium; Attendance: 40,000; Referee: Touraj Haghverdi

22 October 2009 13	Saipa	0 – 2	Persepolis	Tehran
		0-2	M. Zarei 12'; W. Brasilia 32'	Stadium: Azadi Stadium; Attendance: 40,000; Referee: Navid Mozaffari

26 October 2009 14	Persepolis	2 – 1	Tractor	Tehran
	M. Zarei 67'; H. Mulla Mohammed 86'	2-1	F. Kheirkhah 90+3'	Stadium: Azadi Stadium; Attendance: 50,000; Referee: Hedayat Mombeini

31 October 2009 15	Steel Azin	2 – 1	Persepolis	Tehran
	M. Gholami 30'; A. Chavoshi 90'; A. Karimi (yellow card) (yellow-red card) 90+5'	2-1	H. Mulla Mohammed 12'	Stadium: Azadi Stadium; Attendance: 30,000; Referee: Masoud Moradi

5 November 2009 16	Persepolis	2 – 1	Aboumoslem	Tehran
	K. Bagheri 35', 55'	2-1	D. Daneshdoost 44'	Stadium: Azadi Stadium; Attendance: 30,000; Referee: Khodadad Afsharian

28 November 2009 17	Sepahan	2 – 1	Persepolis	Fuladshahr
	I. Touré 27'; H. Aghily 89' (pen.)	2-1	Sh. Rezaei (red card) 35'; S. Heydari 65'; A. Kolahkaj (penalty missed) 70'; H. Norouzi (penalty missed) 90'	Stadium: Fuladshahr Stadium; Attendance: 15,000; Referee: Hedayat Mombeini

4 December 2009 18	Persepolis	2 – 0	Mes Kerman	Tehran
	S. Heydari 49'; M. Khalili 71'	2-0		Stadium: Azadi Stadium; Attendance: 30,000; Referee: Yadollah Jahanbazi

10 December 2009 19	Esteghlal Ahvaz	1 – 0	Persepolis	Ahvaz
	M. Meydavoudi 90+1'	1-0		Stadium: Takhti Stadium; Attendance: 15,000; Referee: Alireza Faghani

18 December 2009 20	Persepolis	1 – 0	Pas	Tehran
	M. Baou 35'	1-0		Stadium: Azadi Stadium; Attendance: 10,000; Referee: Alborz Hajipour

23 December 2009 21	Saba	1 – 1	Persepolis	Qom
	A. Mohammadrezaei 32'	1-1	Sh. Arifi 44'	Stadium: Yadegar-e Emam Stadium; Attendance: 12,000; Referee: Masoud Moradi

9 January 2010 22	Persepolis	1 – 1	Zob Ahan	Tehran
	M. Khalili 53' (pen.)	1-1	K. Amraei 86'	Stadium: Azadi Stadium; Attendance: 20,000; Referee: Mohsen Ghahremani

16 January 2010 23	Shahin Bushehr	4 – 1	Persepolis	Bushehr
	M. Shakroun 19'; M. Kiani 35'; M. Ahmadpouri 66'; H. Soleymani 68'	4-1	H. Mulla Mohammed 90'	Stadium: Shahid Mahdavi Stadium; Attendance: 25,000; Referee: Ahmad Salehi

22 January 2010 24	Persepolis	1 – 0	Rah Ahan	Tehran
	M. Khalili 15'	1-0		Stadium: Azadi Stadium; Attendance: 55,000; Referee: Touraj Haghverdi

29 January 2010 25	Paykan	1 – 3	Persepolis	Qazvin
	J. Asgari 61'	1-3	H. Memar 9' (o.g.); K. Bagheri 45'; M. Khalili 81'	Stadium: Shahid Rajai Stadium; Attendance: 7,000; Referee: Khodadad Afsharian

3 February 2010 26	Persepolis	2 – 1	Esteghlal	Tehran
	H. Norouzi 36'; K. Bagheri 87'	2-1	F. Majidi 16'	Stadium: Azadi Stadium; Attendance: 80,000; Referee: Saeid Mozaffari Zadeh

19 February 2010 27	Moghavemat Sepasi	1 – 2	Persepolis	Shiraz
	I. Mousavi 90+1'	1-2	M. Khalili 21'; T. Fraga 45'	Stadium: Hafezieh Stadium; Attendance: 25,000; Referee: Yadollah Jahanbazi

5 March 2010 28	Persepolis	1 – 0	Foolad	Tehran
	M. Khalili 72'	1-0		Stadium: Azadi Stadium; Attendance: 50,000; Referee: Mahmoud Rafiei

12 March 2010 29	Malavan	1 – 1	Persepolis	Anzali
	M. Oladi 5'	1-1	K. Bagheri 66'; Sh. Rezaei (red card) 90'	Stadium: Sirous Ghayeghran Stadium; Attendance: 10,000; Referee: Hedayat Mombeini

3 April 2010 30	Persepolis	0 – 2	Saipa	Tehran
		0-2	K. Ansarifard 7'; M. Kheiri 47'	Stadium: Azadi Stadium; Attendance: 35,000; Referee: Mohsen Torky

16 April 2010 31	Tractor	1 – 1	Persepolis	Tabriz
	F. Kheirkhah 38'	1-1	H. Norouzi 56'	Stadium: Yadegar-e Emam Stadium; Attendance: 70,000; Referee: Saeid Mozaffari Zadeh

2 May 2010 32	Persepolis	0 – 0	Steel Azin	Tehran
		0-0		Stadium: Azadi Stadium; Attendance: 50,000; Referee: Mohsen Ghahremani

6 May 2010 33	Aboumoslem	3 – 1	Persepolis	Mashhad
	Gelson 11'; J. Zeyghami 19'; R. Nasehi 28'	3-1	S. Heydari 17'	Stadium: Samen Stadiumi; Attendance: 20,000; Referee: Ahmad Salehi

18 May 2010 34	Persepolis	1 – 1	Sepahan	Tehran
	H. Norouzi 46'	1-1	M. Karimian 78'	Stadium: Azadi Stadium; Attendance: 10,000; Referee: Alireza Faghani

==== Score overview ====
Win Draw Loss

Opposition	Home score	Away score	Aggregate score
Aboomoslem	2–1	3–1	3–4
Esteghlal	2–1	1–1	3–2
Esteghlal Ahvaz	1–1	1–0	1–2
Foolad	1–0	0–0	1–0
Malavan	1–1	1–1	2–2
Mes Kerman	2–0	3–3	5–3
Moghavemat	4–2	1–2	6–3
PAS	1–0	1–2	3–1
Paykan	1–2	1–3	4–3
Rah Ahan	1–0	2–2	3–2
Saba	1–0	1–1	2–1
Saipa	0–2	0–2	2–2
Sepahan	1–1	2–1	2–3
Shahin Bushehr	2–2	4–1	3–6
Steel Azin	0–0	2–1	2–1
Tractor	2–1	1–1	3–2
Zob Ahan	1–1	1–1	2–2

=== Results by round ===
Round	1	2	3	4	5	6	7	8	9	10	11	12	13	14	15	16	17	18	19	20	21	22	23	24	25	26	27	28	29	30	31	32	33	34
Ground	A	H	A	H	A	H	A	H	A	H	A	H	A	H	A	H	A	H	A	H	A	H	A	H	A	H	A	H	A	H	A	H	A	H
Result	D	D	W	W	D	D	D	L	D	W	D	D	W	W	L	W	L	W	L	W	D	D	L	W	W	W	W	W	D	L	D	D	L	D
Position	7	10	7	4	6	7	7	8	8	6	7	7	6	6	7	5	7	4	5	3	3	3	5	4	4	3	3	3	3	3	4	4	4	4

Updated to match(es) played on 18 May 2010. Source: "Ipl".
A = Away; H = Home; W = Win; D = Draw; L = Loss

=== Results summary ===
Overall								Home						Away					
Pld	W	D	L	GF	GA	GD	Pts	W	D	L	GF	GA	GD	W	D	L	GF	GA	GD
34	13	14	7	46	40	+6	53	9	6	2	23	15	+8	4	8	5	23	25	−2

	GP	W	D	L	Pts	GF	GA	GD
In Azadi Studium	17	9	6	2	33	23	15	+8
In Other Stadiums	17	4	8	5	20	23	25	-2

Source: "Ipl". iplstats.com.

=== League standings ===
Pos	Team	Pld	W	D	L	GF	GA	GD	Pts	Qualification or relegation
2	Zob Ahan	34	16	13	5	48	29	+19	61	Qualification for the 2011 AFC Champions League
3	Esteghlal	34	16	11	7	49	32	+17	59	Qualification for the 2011 AFC Champions League
4	Persepolis	34	13	14	7	46	40	+6	53	Qualification for the 2011 AFC Champions League
5	Steel Azin	34	13	13	8	55	49	+6	52	
6	Saba	34	13	9	12	52	45	+7	48	

Updated to match(es) played on 01 SEP 2018. Source: IPL Stats, Soccerway
Rules for classification: 1) Points; 2) Goal difference; 3) Goals scored.

=== Top scorers and assists ===
==== Goal scorers ====
10 Goals

- (Iran) Karim Bagheri

8 Goals

- (Iran) Hadi Norouzi

6 Goals

- (Iran) Mohsen Khalili

5 Goals

- (Iraq) Hawar Mulla Mohammed

4 Goals

- (Iran) Sepehr Heidari

3 Goals

- (Iran) Maysam Baou

2 Goals

- (Iran) Mojtaba Zarei
- (Brazil) Wésley Brasilia

1 Goal

- (Iran) Sheys Rezaei
- (Iran) Mohammad Parvin
- (Iran) Adel Kolahkaj
- (Germany) Shpejtim Arifi
- (Brazil) Tiago Alves Fraga

==== Assists ====
4 Assists

- (Iran) Mohsen Khalili
- (Iran) Mehdi Shiri

3 Assists

- (Iran) Hadi Norouzi
- (Iran) Mojtaba Zarei
- (Iraq) Hawar Mulla Mohammed

2 Assists

- (Iran) Sheys Rezaei
- (Iran) Alireza Mohammad
- (Iran) Karim Bagheri
- (Iran) Ebrahim Shakouri

1 Assist

- (Iran) Adel Kolahkaj
- (Iran) Maysam Baou
- (Iran) Nabiollah Bagheriha
- (Iran) Hossein Badamaki
- (Iran) Hamidreza Aliasgari
- (Brazil) Wésley Brasilia
- (Brazil) Tiago Alves Fraga

==== Cards ====
Player	Yellow card	Yellow card Red card	Red card
(Iran) Sheys Rezaei	2	1	1
(Iran) Jalal Akbari	1	1	0
(Iran) Hossein Badamaki	7	0	0
(Iran) Sepehr Heidari	5	0	0
(Iran) Mojtaba Zarei	4	0	0
(Iran) Alireza Mohammad	3	0	0
(Iran) Hadi Norouzi	3	0	0
(Iran) Ebrahim Shakouri	3	0	0
(Iran) Mojtaba Shiri	2	0	0
(Iran) Saman Aghazamani	2	0	0
(Iran) Misagh Memarzadeh	2	0	0
(Iran) Karim Bagheri	2	0	0
(Iran) Adel Kolahkaj	2	0	0
(Brazil) Wésley Brasilia	2	0	0
(Iraq) Hawar Mulla Mohammed	2	0	0
(Iran) Mehdi Shiri	1	0	0
(Iran) Mohammad Parvin	1	0	0
(Iran) Maysam Baou	1	0	0
(Iran) Hamidreza Aliasgari	1	0	0
(Iran) Mohsen Khalili	1	0	0
(Iran) Nabiollah Bagheriha	1	0	0
(Iran) Mohammad Mansouri	1	0	0
(Brazil) Tiago Alves Fraga	1	0	0
Total cards	49	2	1

==== Matches played ====
29

- (Iran) Sepehr Heidari

== Hazfi Cup ==
=== Matches ===
Last updated 24 May 2010
Win Draw Loss Postponed

Date Round	Home	Score	Away	Location

9 February 2010 R32	Iranjavan Bushehr	1 – 2	Persepolis	Bushehr
	E. Sasani 31'		K. Bagheri 17' (penalty missed) 45+5'; H. Mulla Mohammed 51'	Stadium: Shahid Beheshti Stadium; Attendance: 20,000; Referee: Rahim Mehrpishe

26 February 2010 R16	Persepolis	3 – 1	Aluminium Hormozgan	Tehran
	K. Bagheri 2' 42'; M. Khalili 45+2'		H. Dehghani 90+2'	Stadium: Azadi Stadium; Referee: Shahin Hajbabaei

18 March 2010 Quarter-final	Petroshimi Tabriz	1 – 2	Persepolis	Tabriz
	M. Khalili 24', 57'		S. Jokanovic 44'; M. Faramarzi (penalty missed) 72'	Stadium: Yadegar-e Emam Stadium; Attendance: 10,000; Referee: Saeed Bakhshizadeh

23 April 2010 Semi-final	Persepolis	0 – 0 (a.e.t.) (4 – 3 p)	Saba	Tehran
			M. Kashi (yellow card) (yellow-red card) 90+1	Stadium: Azadi Stadium; Attendance: 60,000; Referee: Hedayat Mombeini
	Penalties
	H. Mulla Mohammed (penalty missed); M. Zarei (penalty scored); T. Fraga (penalty scored); M. Khalili (penalty scored); Sh. Rezaei (penalty missed); K. Bagheri (penalty scored)		(penalty scored) D. Haghi; (penalty scored) D. Clementino; (penalty missed) M. Hamrang; (penalty missed) M. Asadi; (penalty scored) S. Bakhtiarizadeh; (penalty missed) A. Hajizadeh

==== Final ====
12 May 2010 first-leg	Gostaresh Foolad	0 – 1	Persepolis	Tabriz
13:30	A. Shabani (red card) 87'		Sh. Rezaei 12'	Stadium: Yadegar-e Emam Stadium; Attendance: 50,000; Referee: Khodadad Afsharian

24 May 2010 Second-leg	Persepolis	3 – 1 (4 – 1 agg.)	Gostaresh Foolad	Tehran
15:30	T. Fraga 31' (pen.); H. Aliasgari 34'; M. Khalili 77'		M. Torkaman (red card) 55'; R. Khatibi 73' (pen.)	Stadium: Azadi Stadium; Attendance: 100,000; Referee: Masoud Moradi

=== Scorers ===
==== Goals ====
4 goals

- (Iran) Mohsen Khalili

3 goals

- (Iran) Karim Bagheri

1 goal

- (Iran) Sheys Rezaei
- (Iran) Hamidreza Aliasgari
- (Iraq) Hawar Mulla Mohammed
- (Brazil) Tiago Alves Fraga

==== Assists ====
3 assists

- (Iraq) Hawar Mulla Mohammed

1 assist

- (Iran) Hadi Norouzi
- (Iran) Alireza Mohammad

==== Cards ====
Player	Yellow card	Yellow card Red card	Red card
(Iran) Ebrahim Shakouri	1	0	0
(Iran) Sheys Rezaei	1	0	0
(Iran) Adel Kolahkaj	1	0	0
(Iran) Karim Bagheri	1	0	0
(Iran) Hossein Badamaki	1	0	0
(Iran) Mohsen Khalili	1	0	0
(Iran) Hamidreza Aliasgari	1	0	0
(Iran) Jalal Akbari	1	0	0
(Iraq) Hawar Mulla Mohammed	1	0	0
(Brazil) Tiago Alves Fraga	1	0	0
Total cards	10	0	0

== Goalkeeping ==
			League			Hazfi Cup			Total		
No	N	Name	M	GA	CS	M	GA	CS	M	GA	CS
20	(Iran)	Alireza Haghighi	14	16	3	4	2	2	18	18	5
1	(Iran)	Misagh Memarzadeh	20	24	5	2	2	0	22	26	5
Total			34	40	8	6	4	2	40	44	10

== Friendly matches ==
- 28 July 2009

Persepolis 2-2 Paykan
Hadi Norouzi 25'
Wésley Brasilia 65'

- 10 August 2009

Persepolis 3-0 Fajr Moghavemat
Karim Bagheri 30' (pen.)
Akbar Saghiri 40'
Mohammad Parvin 80'

- 17 August 2009

Persepolis 1-2 Salar Shemiran
Mohammad Mehdi Elhaei 85'

- 2 September 2009

Persepolis 3-0 (United Arab Emirates) Al-Ahli
Maysam Baou 16'
Saeid Hallafi 55'
Mehdi Shiri 90'

- 15 September 2009

Persepolis 5-2 Dehdari Mashhad
Hawar Mulla (2)
Hamidreza Aliasgari
Saman Aghazamani
Ebrahim Shakouri

- 21 September 2009

Persepolis 3-3 Shensa Save
Hawar Mulla 9'
Akbar Saghiri 35'
Mohammad Parvin 40'

- 12 October 2009

Persepolis 6-1 Ehsan Ray
Mohammad Mansouri
Mohsen Khalili
Shpejtim Arifi (3)
Mohammad Parvin

- 15 November 2009

Persepolis 1-0 (United Arab Emirates) Ocean Marin
Akbar Saghiri 59'

- 19 November 2009

Persepolis 1-1 (Oman) Al-Nahda
Mohsen Khalili 49'

- 31 December 2009

Persepolis 1-0 (United Arab Emirates) Hatta
Mohammad Parvin 60'

- 3 January 2010

Persepolis 1-1 (Qatar) Al-Rayyan
Mohammad Mansouri 85'
Hamidreza Aliasgari (red card)

- 26 March 2010

Persepolis 2-4 (United Arab Emirates) Salem Saad XI
Hadi Norouzi
Hamidreza Aliasgari

- 28 March 2010

Persepolis 5-1 (United Arab Emirates) Al-Nasr
Mohsen Khalili (P)
Karim Bagheri
Mohammad Mansouri
Hamidreza Aliasgari
Mohammad Mehdi Elhaei (P)
Alireza Mohammad (red card)

=== Al-Nasr International Tournament ===
- 29 August 2009

Persepolis 1(7)-1(6) (Syria) Al Karamah S.C.
Hassan Abbas 84' (o.g.)
Mehdi Shiri (red card)

Penalties:

Parvin (penalty scored)
Arifi (penalty scored)
Shakouri (penalty scored)
Brasilia (penalty scored)
Rezaei (penalty missed)
Ali Asgari (penalty scored)
Bagheriha (penalty scored)

Final

- 31 August 2009

Persepolis 0-2 (United Arab Emirates) Al-Nasr
Mohammad Parvin (red card)

== Club ==
=== Kit ===
Supplier: Uhlsport
Sponsor(s): Tehran Municipality

Home Kit	Away Kit	Third Kit

Source: "Persepolis FC' current kit". Archived from the original on 29 January 2010.

=== Club managers ===
Position	Name	Nat
Head coach	Ali Daei	(Iran)
Assistant coach	Hossein Abdi	(Iran)
Fitness coach	Ali Molaei	(Iran)
Goalkeeping coach	Mohammad Ali Yahyavi	(Iran)
Director	Mahmoud Khordbin	(Iran)
Team doctor	Dr. Farid Zarineh	(Iran)

=== Club officials ===
Position	Name
President	(Iran) Habib Kashani (temporary)
Director	(Iran) Mahmoud Khordbin
Academy President	(Iran) Fereydoun Moeini
Media Officer & International Committee President	(Iran) Morteza Hosseinzadeh Zarabi
Financial Officer	(Iran) Ali Akbar Ashouri
Juridical Officer	(Iran) Mostafa Shokripour
Cultural Officer	(Iran) Hojat'ol eslam Seyyed Mohammad Kohnegi
Chairman & Spokesman of board of Directors	(Iran) Majid Farrokhzadi
Ground (capacity and dimensions)	Azadi Stadium (90,000 / 100 x 60 m)

Technical Committee members
(Iran) Homayoun Behzadi
(Iran) Hamid Jasemian
(Iran) Hossein Kalani
(Iran) Mohammad Zadmehr
(Iran) Majid Farrokhzadi
(Iran) Fereydoun Moeini

Disciplinarian Committee members
(Iran) Ali Mohadesi

Board of Directions
(Iran) Majid Farrokhzadi
(Iran) Mohammad Hossein Nejadfallah

Munition Team
(Iran) Ghasem Abdolsamadi
(Iran) Asghar Norouzali

=== Captains ===
1. (Iran) Karim Bagheri
2. (Iran) Sheys Rezaei
3. (Iran) Alireza Haghighi
4. (Iran) Mojtaba Shiri
5. (Iran) Hossein Badamaki

== Squad changes during 2009–10 season ==
=== In ===
No.	Position	Player	Age	Moving from	League	Transfer Window	Ref
33	GK	(Iran) Mohammad Hossein Naeiji	18	(Iran) Esteghlal	Iran Pro League	Summer	
13	DF	(Iran) Sheys Rezaei	25	(Iran) Saba	Iran Pro League	Summer	
17	DF	(Iran) Jalal Akbari	26	(Iran) Sepahan	Iran Pro League	Summer	
18	DF	(Iran) Ebrahim Shakouri	25	(Iran) Payam	(Iran) Azadegan League	Summer	
7	MF	(Iran) Mohammad Parvin	21	(Slovakia) Dunajská Streda	(Slovakia) Slovak Superliga	Summer	
10	MF	(Iran) Maysam Baou	25	(Iran) Aboomoslem	Iran Pro League	Summer	
14	MF	(Iran) Saman Aghazamani	20	(Iran) Saipa	Iran Pro League	Summer	
15	MF	(Iran) Saeid Hallafi	19	(Iran) Sanat Naft	(Iran) Azadegan League	Summer	
21	MF	(Iraq) Hawar Mulla Mohammed	28	(Cyprus) Anorthosis FC	(Cyprus) Cypriot First Division	Summer	
25	MF	(Iran) Mehdi Shiri	31	(Iran) Bargh Shiraz	(Iran) Azadegan League	Summer	
27	MF	(Brazil) Tiago Alves Fraga	28	(Brazil) Mixto	(Brazil) Campeonato Brasileiro Série C	Summer	
40	MF	(Iran) Adel Kolahkaj	24	(Iran) Saba	Iran Pro League	Summer	
8	FW	(Germany) Shpejtim Arifi	30	(Iran) Payam	(Iran) Azadegan League	Summer	
19	FW	(Iran) Akbar Saghiri	27	(Iran) Petrochimi Tabriz	(Iran) Azadegan League	Summer	
28	FW	(Brazil) Wésley Brasilia de Almeida	28	(Brazil) Brasiliense	(Brazil) Campeonato Brasileiro Série B	Summer	
30	FW	(Iran) Mojtaba Zarei	25	(Iran) Rah Ahan	Iran Pro League	Summer	

=== Out ===
No.	Position	Player	Age	Moving to	League	Transfer Window	Ref
1	GK	(Iran) Mehdi Vaezi	34	(Iran) Saba	Iran Pro League	Summer	
30	GK	(Iran) Mohsen Elyasi	22	(Iran) Shensa Save	(Iran) Azadegan League	Summer	
2	DF	(Iran) Masoud Zarei	28	(Iran) Mes	Iran Pro League	Summer	
15	DF	(Iran) Mohammad Alavi	27	(Iran) Foolad	Iran Pro League	Summer	
32	DF	(Togo) Franck Atsou	31	(Iran) Esteghlal Ahvaz	Iran Pro League	Summer	
33	DF	(Iran) Rahman Rezaei	34	(Qatar) Al-Ahli	Qatar Stars League	Summer	
8	MF	(Iran) Ali Karimi	30	(Iran) Steel Azin	Iran Pro League	Summer	
11	MF	(Iran) Maziar Zare	24	(United Arab Emirates) Emirates Club	(United Arab Emirates) UAE Football League	Summer	
18	MF	(Iran) Pejman Nouri	29	(Iran) Malavan	Iran Pro League	Summer	
20	MF	(Iran) Bahador Abdi	25	(Iran) Shahin Bushehr	Iran Pro League	Summer	
21	MF	(Serbia) Ivan Petrović	29	(Iran) Shahin Bushehr	Iran Pro League	Summer	
44	MF	(Iran) Amirhossein Ipakchi	20	(Iran) Petrochimi Tabriz	(Iran) Azadegan League	Summer	
10	FW	(Iran) Alireza Vahedi Nikbakht	29	(Iran) Teraktor Sazi	Iran Pro League	Summer	
17	FW	(Senegal) Ibrahima Touré	23	(Iran) Sepahan	Iran Pro League	Summer	
28	FW	(Iran) Farhad Kheirkhah	25	(Iran) Teraktor Sazi	Iran Pro League	Summer	
12	DF	(Iran) Ziaeddin Niknafs	23	(Iran) Sanat Naft	(Iran) Azadegan League	Winter	
15	MF	(Iran) Saeid Hallafi	19	(Iran) Rah Ahan	Iran Pro League	Winter	
19	FW	(Iran) Akbar Saghiri	27	(Iran) Naft Tehran	(Iran) Azadegan League	Winter	
