= Persepolis F.C.–Sepahan S.C. rivalry =

Soccer rivalry

Persepolis-Sepahan rivalry
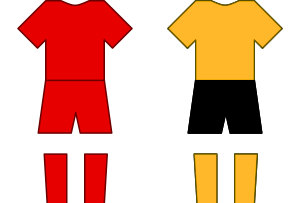
- Other names: Iran El Clasico
- Location: Tehran, Iran; Isfahan, Iran
- Teams: Persepolis Football Club; Sepahan Sport Club
- First meeting: Sepahan 1–2 Persepolis (11 February 1972)
- Latest meeting: Persepolis 2–1 Sepahan (23 January 2026)

Statistics
- Total meetings: Official matches: 88; Total matches: 92
- Most wins: Officials: Persepolis (29); Total: Persepolis (30)
- Top scorer: Edmond Bezik (7)
- Largest victory: Persepolis 6–0 Sepahan; 1971–72 Local League (19 March 1972)

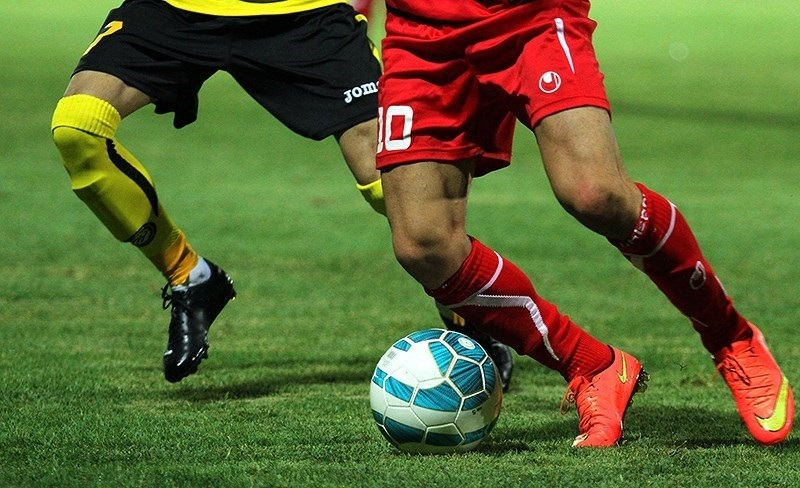
Sepahan (left) and Persepolis playing in 2015.

The rivalry between Persepolis and Sepahan is a footballing rivalry played between Iranian clubs Persepolis and Sepahan.

== History ==
=== 2006 Hazfi Cup Final ===
This rivalry started in 2006 when Sepahan and Persepolis contested the Hafzi Cup championship, Iranian football's second-most prestigious competition. After both teams drew 1–1 in the first leg in Tehran, the two sides returned to Esfahan's Nagshe Jahan Stadium for the second leg, which would decide the champion. The game ended with a 1–1 draw even after extra time, which led to a penalty shootout, which led to a Sepahan winning the shootout 4–2.

=== 2007 Hazfi Cup Semifinal ===
The two sides would meet again at the 2007 Hazfi Cup semifinal at the Azadi Stadium. After 90 minutes of regular time, the score was 1-1, which led to an extra-time hat-trick by Mahmoud Karimi, leading to Sepahan's 4–1 victory. Sepahan would go on to win the Hafzi Cup 4–0 on aggregate against Saba Battery.

=== 2008 IPL Championship ===
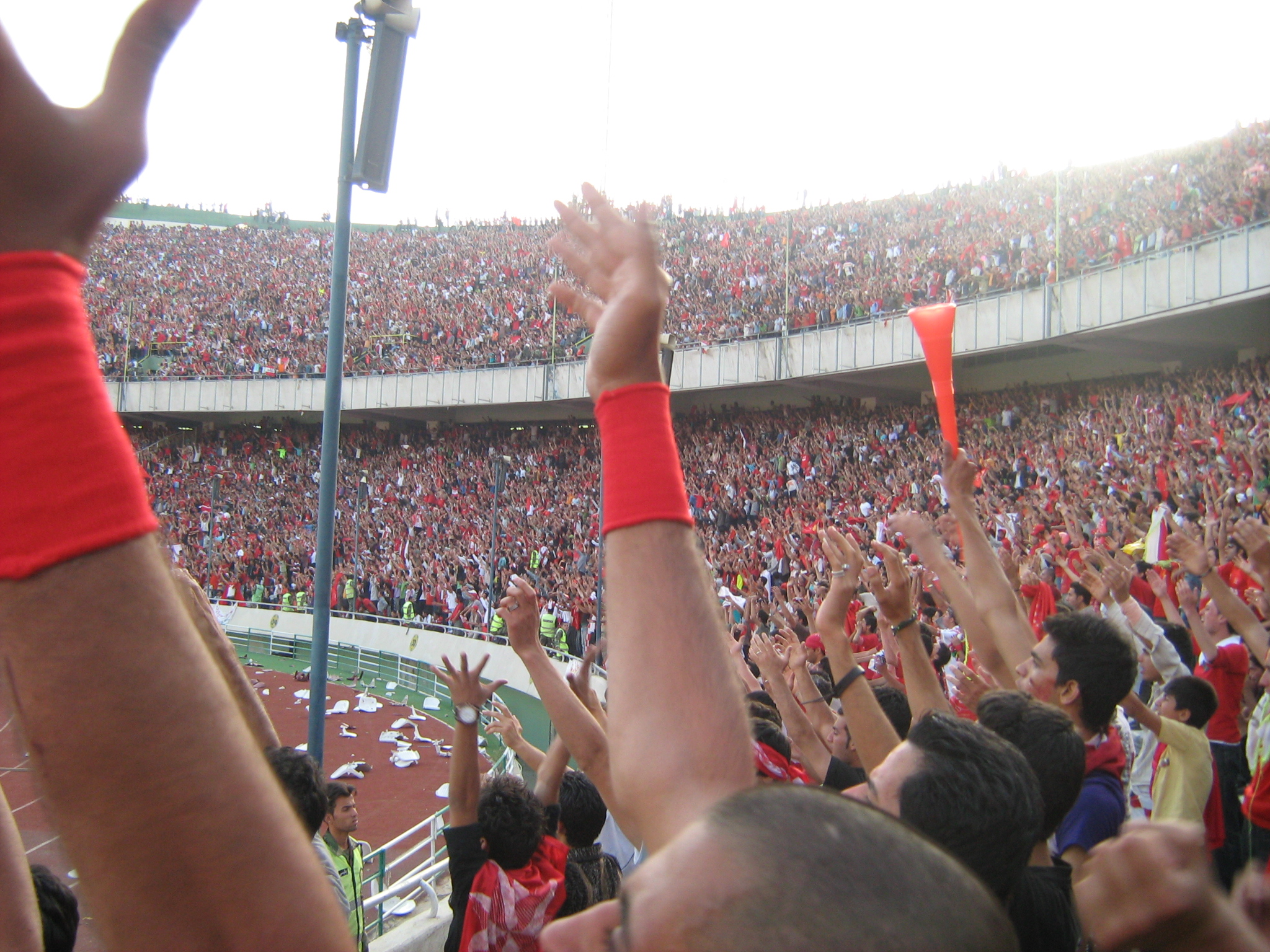
Persepolis' fans after the match of Persepolis-Sepahan in the 2007–08 season

Throughout the 2007–2008 Iran Pro League season, Persepolis, under new head coach Afshin Ghotbi, were first in the league. The only significant title contender were Sepahan. In the middle of the season, Persepolis and Sepahan met at Esfahan's Fouladshahr Stadium. Sepahan won that game 2–1, handing Persepolis their first loss of the season. However, Sepahan would lose five points (reduced to three on an appeal) due to fan violence. But Persepolis also lost six points due to inability to pay former players. All things considered, Sepahan had a two-point lead over Persepolis at the top going into the last week of the season.

As fate would have it, the two teams would meet on the last day of the season in front 100,000 raucous fans in Azadi Stadium. Sepahan needed only a point to be crowned champs, while nothing less than a victory would do for the red giants. Persepolis got off to a dream start with a goal in the 18th minute from the league's top goalscorer, Mohsen Khalili. Khalili would also go on to hit the post and Persepolis was also denied a penalty kick on a controversial non-call by referee Saeed Mozafarri. Those misses would prove to be costly as 18-year-old sensation Ehsan Hajisafi would tie the game on a breakaway in the 30th minute. At halftime, it remained 1–1, and Sepahan was just 45 minutes away from breaking the reds' hearts once more.

Throughout the second half, it was all one-way traffic as Ghotbi's men put four strikers upfront against Sepahan's defense, which still stood strong for almost the entire second half and did not allow Persepolis to get the imperative goal they needed. After 90 minutes plus five minutes of stoppage time, the score was still the same, and Sepahan was getting ready to celebrate. But this time, luck would shift Persepolis' way. A Khalili free kick bounced at the feet of Karim Bagheri. Bagheri's experience would take over from there, as he sent a high cross to Sepehr Heidari who headed the ball in the back of the net in the 96th minute, giving Persepolis the championship, sending the crowd into a frenzy. Heidari's goal earned him a spot in Persepolis lore and proved to be a historic and memorable moment in team history.

=== 2009 Hazfi Cup Round of 16 ===
The two teams would meet at the Azadi Stadium again, this time in the Round of 16 of the Hazfi Cup. This time, however, both teams had been through a very lackluster season as they both changed coaches twice during the regular season. Sepahan and Persepolis finished 4th and 5th respectively in the IPL, which meant a very underachieving season for both teams.

Persepolis would take an early lead on a 12th minute cracker by Maziar Zare. Since then, the game became more lively as both teams created numerous chances. Zare also missed a golden opportunity to double his goal tally and Persepolis' lead after missing a penalty kick. In second half stoppage time, Sepahan captain Moharram Navidkia also squandered a tailor-made opportunity by firing over the bar from just a few yards out. Persepolis would go on to the quarterfinals, where they went down 2–1 to Pas Hamedan.

The aftermath of this game was very ironic in the sense that Sepahan, despite crashing out of the Hazfi Cup, would still qualify for the AFC Champions League because neighbors Zob Ahan, who finished second (among the top three) in the IPL, won the Hazfi Cup, which gave 4th placed Sepahan qualification to the AFC Champions League. Persepolis, however, had nothing to show for their efforts after having a more expensive squad than last season, when they won the IPL.

=== 2013 Hazfi Cup Final ===
The 2013 Hazfi Cup Final was the clubs' second meeting in the final where Sepahan won 4–2 over Persepolis in the penalties in 2006. The match was also the last match of Persepolis captain Mehdi Mahdavikia, a former Iran national football team and Hamburg SV midfielder. After failed to agree on a venue between Ahvaz, Mashhad and Tabriz, final venue was decided with draw which Azadi Stadium was announced as the venue for the 2013 final. The two teams finished 1–1 in regular time and 2–2 after extra-time. The game went to penalties and Sepahan defeated Persepolis 4–2 in the penalty shootout.

== Iranian League ==
No.	Date	Home team	Score	Away team	Home goal scorers	Away goal scorers	Venue	Competition
1	1972–Feb-11	Sepahan	1–2	Persepolis	Hajrasouli (9)	Kalani (42), Khordbin (67)	Isfahan	1971–72 Local League
2	1972–Mar-19	Persepolis	6–0	Sepahan	Adibi (3), Behzadi (11, 55), Parvin (57), Khordbin (64), Vatankhah (83)	–	Tehran	1971–72 Local League
3	1974–Apr-12	Sepahan	0–1	Persepolis	–	Parvin (13 p.)	Isfahan	1974–75 Takht Jamshid Cup
4	1974–Oct-25	Persepolis	3–0	Sepahan	Iranpak (60), Dastjerdi (82, 85)	–	Tehran	1974–75 Takht Jamshid Cup
5	1975–May-29	Persepolis	1–0	Sepahan	Haj Rahimipour (26)	–	Tehran	1975–76 Takht Jamshid Cup
6	1975–Nov-21	Sepahan	0–0	Persepolis	–	–	Isfahan	1975–76 Takht Jamshid Cup
7	1976–Aug-20	Persepolis	2–2	Sepahan	Haj Rahimipour (18), Parvin (62)	Yazdkhasti (77 p.), Saffarpour (78)	Tehran	1976–77 Takht Jamshid Cup
8	1976–Dec-3	Sepahan	1–1	Persepolis	Saffarpour (22)	Fattahi (68)	Isfahan	1976–77 Takht Jamshid Cup
9	1977–Jul-15	Persepolis	3–0	Sepahan	Khordbin (14), Dehghan (23 o.g.), Iranpak (25)	–	Tehran	1977–78 Takht Jamshid Cup
10	1978–Jan-6	Sepahan	0–0	Persepolis	–	–	Isfahan	1977–78 Takht Jamshid Cup
12	1989–Aug-28	Sepahan	1–1	Persepolis	Talakesh (26)	Kermani Moghaddam (64)	Isfahan	1989–90 Qods League
13	1990–Mar-16	Persepolis	3–0	Sepahan	Abedian (37), Yousefi (59), Bavi (77)	–	Tehran	1989–90 Qods League
14	1991–Aug-9	Persepolis	3–0	Sepahan	Mohammadkhani (5, 15), Moharrami (23 p.)	–	Tehran	1991–92 Azadegan League
15	1992–Feb-28	Sepahan	0–0	Persepolis	–	–	Isfahan	1991–92 Azadegan League
16	1993–Nov-12	Persepolis	3–0	Sepahan	Shahmohammadi (47), Pious (55), Manafi (83)	–	Tehran	1993–94 Azadegan League
17	1994–Jan-25	Sepahan	1–0	Persepolis	Motahari (80 p.)	–	Isfahan	1993–94 Azadegan League
18	1995–Aug-4	Persepolis	1–1	Sepahan	Shirmohammadi (42)	Ghanbari (65 p.)	Tehran	1995–96 Azadegan League
19	1996–Jan-7	Sepahan	1–1	Persepolis	Ghanbari (62)	Rahbarifar (59)	Isfahan	1995–96 Azadegan League
21	1996–Oct-30	Persepolis	2–2	Sepahan	Rahbarifar (4), Bezik (25)	Stepanyan (47), Veisi (67 p.)	Tehran	1996–97 Azadegan League
22	1997–Mar-15	Sepahan	1–0	Persepolis	Stepanyan (14)	–	Isfahan	1996–97 Azadegan League
23	1998–Oct-9	Sepahan	1–0	Persepolis	Stepanyan (59)	–	Isfahan	1998–99 Azadegan League
24	1999–Feb-22	Persepolis	3–1	Sepahan	Bezik (39, 81), Estili (66)	Dehghani (18)	Tehran	1998–99 Azadegan League
27	1999–Nov-20	Sepahan	0–0	Persepolis	–	–	Isfahan	1999–2000 Azadegan League
28	2000–Apr-28	Persepolis	1–0	Sepahan	Seraj 31'	–	Tehran	1999–2000 Azadegan League
29	2000–Dec-23	Sepahan	0–0	Persepolis	–	–	Isfahan	2000–01 Azadegan League
30	2001–Apr-19	Persepolis	0–2	Sepahan	–	Mousavi (67, 86)	Tabriz	2000–01 Azadegan League
31	2001–Nov-23	Sepahan	0–0	Persepolis	–	–	Isfahan	2001–02 Iran Pro League
32	2002–Mar-17	Persepolis	3–2	Sepahan	Rahbarifar (23 p.), Aslanian (86), Abolghasempour (90+3)	Stepanyan (46), Hajipour (64)	Tehran	2001–02 Iran Pro League
33	2003–Jan-02	Sepahan	2–1	Persepolis	Bezik (23), Navidkia (86 p.)	Ansarian (61)	Isfahan	2002–03 Iran Pro League
34	2003–May-19	Persepolis	1–1	Sepahan	Ansarian (82)	Farshbaf (62)	Tehran	2002–03 Iran Pro League
35	2003–Sep-30	Persepolis	3–3	Sepahan	Jabbari (23), Salmani (52), Traoré (73)	Talebnasab (37), Bezik (40 p., 48)	Tehran	2003–04 Iran Pro League
36	2004–Jan-16	Sepahan	1–2	Persepolis	Karimi Sibaki (46)	Peyrovani (54), Jamshidi (89)	Isfahan	2003–04 Iran Pro League
37	2004–Oct-29	Sepahan	0–0	Persepolis	–	–	Isfahan	2004–05 Iran Pro League
38	2005–May-15	Persepolis	1–2	Sepahan	Kazemian (17)	Khatibi (76, 90+2)	Tehran	2004–05 Iran Pro League
39	2005–Dec-23	Persepolis	2–3	Sepahan	Kazemian (35), P. Nouri (56)	Khatibi (30, 68'), Jafari (52)	Tehran	2005–06 Iran Pro League
40	2006–Apr-21	Sepahan	2–0	Persepolis	Khatibi (69), Mujiri (85)	–	Isfahan	2005–06 Iran Pro League
43	2006–Oct-22	Sepahan	0–0	Persepolis	–	–	Isfahan	2006–07 Persian Gulf Cup
44	2007–Feb-9	Persepolis	2–1	Sepahan	Hajizadeh (18), Madanchi (89)	Navidkia (78)	Tehran	2006–07 Persian Gulf Cup
46	2007–Dec-31	Sepahan	2–1	Persepolis	Nosrati (36 o.g.), Mohammed (41)	Aghaei (80)	Isfahan	2007–08 Persian Gulf Cup
47	2008–May-17	Persepolis	2–1	Sepahan	Khalili (17), S. Heydari (90+6)	Hajsafi (30)	Tehran	2007–08 Persian Gulf Cup
48	2008–Oct-26	Persepolis	3–2	Sepahan	Bagheri (12), Vahedi Nikbakht (45, 64)	Mohammed (28, 34)	Tehran	2008–09 Persian Gulf Cup
49	2009–Feb-27	Sepahan	0–0	Persepolis	–	–	Isfahan	2008–09 Persian Gulf Cup
51	2009–Nov-28	Sepahan	2–1	Persepolis	Toure (27), Aghili (90 p.)	S. Heydari (65)	Isfahan	2009–10 Persian Gulf Cup
52	2010–May-18	Persepolis	1–1	Sepahan	Norouzi (47)	Karimian (77)	Tehran	2009–10 Persian Gulf Cup
53	2010–Sep-29	Persepolis	1–4	Sepahan	Tiago (31)	Toure (41), Aghili (66 p.), Kh. Heydari 73', Enayati (86 p.)	Tehran	2010–11 Persian Gulf Cup
54	2011–May-15	Sepahan	0–0	Persepolis	–	–	Isfahan	2010–11 Persian Gulf Cup
56	2011–Nov 19	Persepolis	0–0	Sepahan	–	–	Tehran	2011–12 Persian Gulf Cup
57	2012–Apr-12	Sepahan	1–1	Persepolis	Sukaj (81)	M. Nouri (86)	Isfahan	2011–12 Persian Gulf Cup
58	2012–Sep-23	Sepahan	2–0	Persepolis	Kolahkaj (51), Sukaj (72)	–	Isfahan	2012–13 Persian Gulf Cup
59	2013–Feb-26	Persepolis	1–0	Sepahan	Norouzi (90+2)	–	Tehran	2012–13 Persian Gulf Cup
61	2013–Sep-20	Sepahan	2–0	Persepolis	Aghili (6 p.), Jahan Alian (90+4)	–	Isfahan	2013–14 Persian Gulf Cup
62	2014–Jan-31	Persepolis	2–0	Sepahan	Abbaszadeh (12), Aliasgari (18)	–	Tehran	2013–14 Persian Gulf Cup
63	2014–Oct-3	Sepahan	1–0	Persepolis	Sharifi (90+4)	–	Isfahan	2014–15 Persian Gulf Pro League
64	2015–Apr-16	Persepolis	1–2	Sepahan	Norouzi (44)	Sharifi (85), Chimba (90+2)	Tehran	2014–15 Persian Gulf Pro League
65	2015–Aug-13	Sepahan	4–2	Persepolis	Hajsafi (8), Umaña (39 o.g.), Aghili (56 p.), Khalatbari (82)	Taremi (12), Alishah (32)	Isfahan	2015–16 Persian Gulf Pro League
66	2016–Feb-02	Persepolis	2–2	Sepahan	Alipour (50), Kamyabinia (75)	Musaev (10), Chimba (65)	Tehran	2015–16 Persian Gulf Pro League
67	2016–Sep-21	Sepahan	1–3	Persepolis	Hajsafi (23),	Alishah (15), Taremi (61, 74)	Isfahan	2016–17 Persian Gulf Pro League
68	2017–Feb-18	Persepolis	2–1	Sepahan	Taremi (61), Rezaeian (88 p.)	Reykani (80 p.)	Tehran	2016–17 Persian Gulf Pro League
69	2017–Sep-21	Sepahan	2–2	Persepolis	Hussein (61), Alimohammadi (87)	Taremi (39 p.), Alipour (74)	Isfahan	2017–18 Persian Gulf Pro League
70	2018–Feb-3	Persepolis	2–0	Sepahan	Alipour (10) Khalilzadeh (68)	–	Tehran	2017–18 Persian Gulf Pro League
71	2018–Dec-09	Sepahan	1–1	Persepolis	Pourghaz (74)	Alipour (89 p.)	Isfahan	2018–19 Persian Gulf Pro League
72	2019–Apr-26	Persepolis	0–0	Sepahan	–	–	Tehran	2018–19 Persian Gulf Pro League
74	2019–Sep-26	Persepolis	0–2	Sepahan	–	Kiros (81), Mo. Mohebi (85)	Tehran	2019–20 Persian Gulf Pro League
75	2020–Feb-23	Sepahan	(awarded); 0–3	Persepolis	–	–	Isfahan	2019–20 Persian Gulf Pro League
76	2021–Jan-05	Persepolis	0–0	Sepahan	–	–	Tehran	2020–21 Persian Gulf Pro League
77	2021–May-09	Sepahan	1–1	Persepolis	Mo. Mohebi (87)	Alekasir (55)	Isfahan	2020–21 Persian Gulf Pro League
79	2021–Dec-29	Sepahan	0–1	Persepolis	–	Kamyabinia (33)	Arak	2021–22 Persian Gulf Pro League
80	2022–May-14	Persepolis	1–2	Sepahan	A. Nemati (83)	Nejadmehdi (36), Shahbazzadeh (48)	Sirjan	2021–22 Persian Gulf Pro League
81	2022–Oct-07	Sepahan	0–0	Persepolis	–	–	Isfahan	2022–23 Persian Gulf Pro League
84	2023–Mar-11	Persepolis	0–1	Sepahan	–	Mo. Karimi (90+4)	Tehran	2022–23 Persian Gulf Pro League
85	2023–Nov-12	Sepahan	1–0	Persepolis	R. Asadi (70)	–	Isfahan	2023–24 Persian Gulf Pro League
86	2024–May-01	Persepolis	0–0	Sepahan	–	–	Tehran	2023–24 Persian Gulf Pro League
87	2024–Dec-18	Sepahan	2–1	Persepolis	Hazbavi (16), Limouchi (71)	Khodabandelou (25)	Isfahan	2024–25 Persian Gulf Pro League
90	2025–Apr-18	Persepolis	0–2	Sepahan	–	Me. Mohebi (2), Gvelesiani (12 o.g.)	Tehran	2024–25 Persian Gulf Pro League
91	2025–Aug-25	Sepahan	0–1	Persepolis	–	Alipour (44)	Isfahan	2025–26 Persian Gulf Pro League
92	2026–Jan-23	Persepolis	2–1	Sepahan	Urunov (53), Sergeev (72)	Alves (90+13 p.)	Tehran	2025–26 Persian Gulf Pro League

== Iranian Cups ==
=== Hazfi Cup ===
No.	Date	Home team	Score	Away team	Home goal scorers	Away goal scorers	Venue	Season	Round
25	1999–May-29	Persepolis	2–2	Sepahan	Halali (70 p.), Emamifar (81)	Veisi (36), Basirat (80 p.)	Tehran	1998–99	Quarter Final
26	1999–June-27	Sepahan	0–1	Persepolis	–	Bezik 7'	Isfahan	1998–99	Quarter Final
41	2006–Sep-13	Persepolis	1–1	Sepahan	Vahedi Nikbakht (48)	Shafiei (73)	Tehran	2005–06	Final
42	2006–Sep-22	Sepahan	1–1 (4–2p.)	Persepolis	Shafiei (64)	E. Asadi (55)	Isfahan	2005–06	Final
45	2007–May-29	Persepolis	1–4 (a.e.t.)	Sepahan	Ashoobi (63 p.)	Aghili (87 p.), Karimi Sibaki (108, 111, 117)	Tehran	2006–07	Semi Final
50	2009–Apr-30	Persepolis	1–0	Sepahan	Zare (12)	–	Tehran	2008–09	Round of 16
55	2011–May-29	Persepolis	0–0 (4–2p.)	Sepahan	–	–	Tehran	2010–11	Quarter Final
60	2013–May-05	Persepolis	2–2 (2–4p.)	Sepahan	Ansarifard (24), M. Nouri (99)	Sukaj (59), Gholami (106)	Tehran	2012–13	Final
73	2019–May-29	Sepahan	0–1 (a.e.t.)	Persepolis	–	Yazdani (120+1 o.g.)	Isfahan	2018–19	Semi Final
83	2023–Feb-22	Sepahan	2–4 (a.e.t.)	Persepolis	Esmaeilifar (41 o.g.), Ahmadzadeh (74)	Gvelesiani (12 p., 100 p.), Alekasir (57), S. Nemati (94)	Isfahan	2022–23	Round of 16
89	2025–Feb-12	Sepahan	3–2 (a.e.t.)	Persepolis	Me. Mohebi (14), Daneshgar (88), Zakipour (93)	Alipour (40), Ahmadzadeh (72)	Isfahan	2024–25	Round of 16

=== Super Cup ===
No.	Date	Home team	Score	Away team	Home goal scorers	Away goal scorers	Venue	Competition
88	2025–Jan-17	Sepahan	1–0	Persepolis	N'Zonzi (3)	–	Arak	2024 Super Cup

== Friendlies and Exhibitions ==
No.	Date	Home team	Score	Away team	Home goal scorers	Away goal scorers	Venue	Competition
11	1982–Sep-10	Sepahan	0–0	Persepolis	–	–	Isfahan	Friendly
20	1996–May-7	Sepahan	1–1	Persepolis	Stepanyan (70 p.)	Pious (25 p.)	Isfahan	Naghsh-Jahan Cup
78	2021–Oct-8	Persepolis	3–1	Sepahan	J. Hosseini, Alekasir, Pakdel	M. Hosseini	Tehran	Friendly
82	2022–Dec-13	Persepolis	2–2	Sepahan	Pakdel, S. Nemati (p.)	Moghanlou (twice)	Tehran	Friendly

== Summary of results ==
Tournament	Matches	Wins		Draws	Goals	
Tournament	Matches	Persepolis	Sepahan	Draws	Persepolis	Sepahan
League	76	25	22	29	87	75
Hazfi Cup	11	4	2	5	16	15
Super Cup	1	0	1	0	0	1
Total Official Matches	88	29	25	34	103	91
Exhibition games	4	1	0	3	6	4
Grand Total	92	30	25	37	109	95

=== Head-to-head ranking in League (1970–2025) ===
P.	71	72	74	75	76	77	78	90	92	93	94	95	96	97	98	99	00	01	02	03	04	05	06	07	08	09	10	11	12	13	14	15	16	17	18	19	20	21	22	23	24	25
1		1	1		1								1	1		1	1		1	1					1		1	1	1			1		1	1	1	1	1		1	1	
2				2		2	2	2		2	2							2							2						2		2			2		2	2	2		2
3									3					3		3				3				3						3									3		3	3
4	4											4					4					4				4	4	4			4											
5		5											5								5			5		5								5			5					
6									6						6						6																					
7																		7					7							7												
8																																8										
9																			9																							
10				10																		10																				
11					11						11	11																					11									
12																													12													
13							13	13															13																			
14						14																													14							
15																																										
16																																										
17																																										
18																																										

• Total: Persepolis with 29 higher finishes, Sepahan with 9 higher finishes (till end of the 2024–25 Persian Gulf Pro League)

== Records ==
Friendly matches are not included in the following records unless otherwise noted.

=== Results ===
==== Biggest wins (+3 goals difference) ====
Winning margin	Home team	Result	Away team	Date	Competition
6	**Persepolis**	6–0	Sepahan	19 March 1972	League
3	**Persepolis**	3–0	Sepahan	25 October 1974	League
3	**Persepolis**	3–0	Sepahan	15 July 1977	League
3	**Persepolis**	3–0	Sepahan	16 March 1990	League
3	**Persepolis**	3–0	Sepahan	9 August 1991	League
3	**Persepolis**	3–0	Sepahan	12 November 1993	League
3	Persepolis	1–4	**Sepahan**	29 May 2007	Hazfi Cup
3	Persepolis	1–4	**Sepahan**	29 September 2010	League

==== Most goals in a match ====
Goals	Home team	Result	Away team	Date	Competition
6	Persepolis	6–0	Sepahan	19 March 1972	League
6	Persepolis	3–3	Sepahan	30 September 2003	League
6	Sepahan	4–2	Persepolis	13 August 2015	League
6	Sepahan	2–4	Persepolis	22 February 2023	Hazfi Cup
5	Persepolis	3–2	Sepahan	17 March 2002	League
5	Persepolis	2–3	Sepahan	23 December 2005	League
5	Persepolis	1–4	Sepahan	29 May 2007	Hazfi Cup
5	Persepolis	3–2	Sepahan	26 October 2008	League
5	Persepolis	1–4	Sepahan	29 September 2010	League
5	Sepahan	3–2	Persepolis	12 February 2025	Hazfi Cup

==== Most consecutive wins ====
Games	Club	Period
5	Persepolis	11 February 1972 – 29 May 1975
4	Sepahan	18 December 2024 – 18 April 2025

==== Most consecutive draws ====
Games	Period
4	15 May 2011 – 12 April 2012

==== Most consecutive without a draw ====
Games	Period
6	18 December 2024 – 23 January 2026

==== Longest unbeaten runs ====
Games	Club	Period
15 (9 wins)	Persepolis	11 February 1972 – 12 November 1993
8 (4 wins)	Persepolis	2 February 2016 – 29 May 2019
8 (3 wins)	Sepahan	28 November 2009 – 23 September 2012

==== Most consecutive games scoring ====
Games	Club	Period
8	Sepahan	25 January 1994 – 29 May 1999
8	Persepolis	16 April 2015 – 9 December 2018

==== Most consecutive without conceding a goal ====
Games	Club	Period
5	Persepolis	19 March 1972 – 21 November 1975
4	Persepolis	16 March 1990 – 11 November 1993

=== Players ===
==== Goal scorers ====
- Does not include friendly matches.
- Players in **bold** are still active for Persepolis or Sepahan.

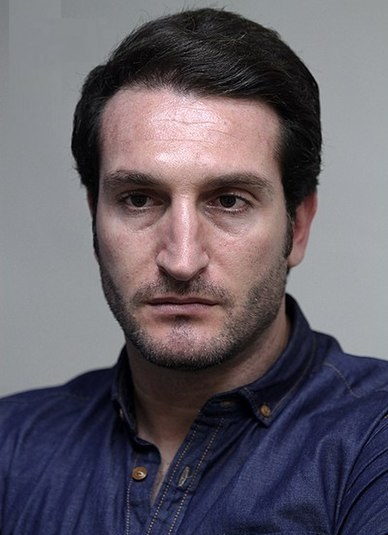
Edmond Bezik, top goalscorer of rivalries with 7 goals.

Pos.	Player	Club(s)	League	Cup	Super Cup	Total
1	(Iran) Edmond Bezik	Persepolis Sepahan	3 3	1 –	–	7
2	(Iran) **Ali Alipour**	Persepolis	5	1	–	6
3	(Iran) Rasoul Khatibi	Sepahan	5	–	–	5
3	(Iran) Mehdi Taremi	Persepolis	5	–	–	5
3	(Iran) Hadi Aghily	Sepahan	4	1	–	5
6	(Iran) Mahmoud Karimi Sibaki	Sepahan	1	3	–	4
7	(Iran) Ali Parvin	Persepolis	3	–	–	3
7	(Iran) Mahmoud Khordbin	Persepolis	3	–	–	3
7	(Armenia) Levon Stepanyan	Sepahan	3	–	–	3
7	(Iran) Behrouz Rahbarifar	Persepolis	3	–	–	3
7	(Iraq) Emad Mohammed	Sepahan	3	–	–	3
7	(Iran) Hadi Norouzi	Persepolis	3	–	–	3
7	(Iran) Ehsan Hajsafi	Sepahan	3	–	–	3
7	(Iran) Alireza Vahedi Nikbakht	Persepolis	2	1	–	3
7	(Albania) Xhevahir Sukaj	Sepahan	2	1	–	3
16	(Iran) Homayoun Behzadi	Persepolis	2	–	–	2
16	(Iran) Mohammad Dastjerdi	Persepolis	2	–	–	2
16	(Iran) Esmaeil Haj Rahimipour	Persepolis	2	–	–	2
16	(Iran) Safar Iranpak	Persepolis	2	–	–	2
16	(Iran) Reza Saffarpour	Sepahan	2	–	–	2
16	(Iran) Nasser Mohammadkhani	Persepolis	2	–	–	2
16	(Iran) Karim Ghanbari	Sepahan	2	–	–	2
16	(Iran) Amin Mousavi	Sepahan	2	–	–	2
16	(Iran) Ali Ansarian	Persepolis	2	–	–	2
16	(Iran) Javad Kazemian	Persepolis	2	–	–	2
16	(Iran) Moharram Navidkia	Sepahan	2	–	–	2
16	(Iran) Sepehr Heydari	Persepolis	2	–	–	2
16	(Senegal) Ibrahima Toure	Sepahan	2	–	–	2
16	(Iran) Mehdi Sharifi	Sepahan	2	–	–	2
16	(Brazil) Luciano Pereira	Sepahan	2	–	–	2
16	(Iran) Omid Alishah	Persepolis	2	–	–	2
16	(Iran) Mohammad Mohebi	Sepahan	2	–	–	2
16	(Iran) Kamal Kamyabinia	Persepolis	2	–	–	2
16	(Iran) Abdollah Veisi	Sepahan	1	1	–	2
16	(Iran) Mohammad Nouri	Persepolis	1	1	–	2
16	(Iran) Issa Alekasir	Persepolis	1	1	–	2
16	(Iran) **Mohammad Mehdi Mohebi**	Sepahan	1	1	–	2
16	(Iran) Hamid Shafiei	Sepahan	–	2	–	2
16	(Georgia (country)) Giorgi Gvelesiani	Persepolis	–	2	–	2
16	(Iran) Farshad Ahmadzadeh	Sepahan Persepolis	–	1 1	–	2
41	(Iran) Hossein Kalani	Persepolis	1	–	–	1
41	(Iran) Asghar Adibi	Persepolis	1	–	–	1
41	(Iran) Reza Vatankhah	Persepolis	1	–	–	1
41	(Iran) Mohsen Yazdkhasti	Sepahan	1	–	–	1
41	(Iran) Jahangir Fattahi	Persepolis	1	–	–	1
41	(Iran) Morteza Kermani Moghaddam	Persepolis	1	–	–	1
41	(Iran) Hossein Talakesh	Sepahan	1	–	–	1
41	(Iran) Reza Abedian	Persepolis	1	–	–	1
41	(Iran) Rahim Yousefi	Persepolis	1	–	–	1
41	(Iran) Karim Bavi	Persepolis	1	–	–	1
41	(Iran) Mojtaba Moharrami	Persepolis	1	–	–	1
41	(Iran) Jamshid Shahmohammadi	Persepolis	1	–	–	1
41	(Iran) Farshad Pious	Persepolis	1	–	–	1
41	(Iran) Javad Manafi	Persepolis	1	–	–	1
41	(Iran) Hamid Motahari	Sepahan	1	–	–	1
41	(Iran) Hassan Shirmohammadi	Persepolis	1	–	–	1
41	(Iran) Hamid Estili	Persepolis	1	–	–	1
41	(Iran) Davoud Dehghani	Sepahan	1	–	–	1
41	(Iran) Behnam Seraj	Persepolis	1	–	–	1
41	(Iran) Afshin Hajipour	Sepahan	1	–	–	1
41	(Iran) Amirhossein Aslanian	Persepolis	1	–	–	1
41	(Iran) Behnam Abolghasempour	Persepolis	1	–	–	1
41	(Iran) Nasser Farshbaf	Sepahan	1	–	–	1
41	(Iran) Reza Jabbari	Persepolis	1	–	–	1
41	(Iran) Asghar Talebnasab	Sepahan	1	–	–	1
41	(Iran) Ali Salmani	Persepolis	1	–	–	1
41	(Mali) Issa Traoré	Persepolis	1	–	–	1
41	(Iran) Afshin Peyrovani	Persepolis	1	–	–	1
41	(Iran) Pejman Jamshidi	Persepolis	1	–	–	1
41	(Iran) Hadi Jafari	Sepahan	1	–	–	1
41	(Iran) Pejman Nouri	Persepolis	1	–	–	1
41	(Georgia (country)) Jaba Mujiri	Sepahan	1	–	–	1
41	(Iran) Abolfazl Hajizadeh	Persepolis	1	–	–	1
41	(Iran) Mehrzad Madanchi	Persepolis	1	–	–	1
41	(Iran) Abbas Aghaei	Persepolis	1	–	–	1
41	(Iran) Mohsen Khalili	Persepolis	1	–	–	1
41	(Iran) Mehdi Karimian	Sepahan	1	–	–	1
41	(Brazil) Tiago Fraga	Persepolis	1	–	–	1
41	(Iran) Khosro Heydari	Sepahan	1	–	–	1
41	(Iran) Reza Enayati	Sepahan	1	–	–	1
41	(Iran) Adel Kolahkaj	Sepahan	1	–	–	1
41	(Iran) Amin Jahan Alian	Sepahan	1	–	–	1
41	(Iran) Mohammad Abbaszadeh	Persepolis	1	–	–	1
41	(Iran) Hamidreza Aliasgari	Persepolis	1	–	–	1
41	(Iran) Mohammad Reza Khalatbari	Sepahan	1	–	–	1
41	(Uzbekistan) Fozil Musaev	Sepahan	1	–	–	1
41	(Iran) Taleb Reykani	Sepahan	1	–	–	1
41	(Iran) Ramin Rezaeian	Persepolis	1	–	–	1
41	(Iraq) Marwan Hussein	Sepahan	1	–	–	1
41	(Iran) Jalaleddin Alimohammadi	Sepahan	1	–	–	1
41	(Iran) Shoja' Khalilzadeh	Persepolis	1	–	–	1
41	(Iran) Ezzatollah Pourghaz	Sepahan	1	–	–	1
41	(Brazil) Kiros Stanlley	Sepahan	1	–	–	1
41	(Iran) Mohammad Nejadmehdi	Sepahan	1	–	–	1
41	(Iran) Sajjad Shahbazzadeh	Sepahan	1	–	–	1
41	(Iran) Ali Nemati	Persepolis	1	–	–	1
41	(Iran) **Mohammad Karimi**	Sepahan	1	–	–	1
41	(Iran) Reza Asadi	Sepahan	1	–	–	1
41	(Iran) **Mohammad Amin Hazbavi**	Sepahan	1	–	–	1
41	(Iran) **Mohammad Khodabandelou**	Persepolis	1	–	–	1
41	(Iran) **Mehdi Limouchi**	Sepahan	1	–	–	1
41	(Uzbekistan) **Oston Urunov**	Persepolis	1	–	–	1
41	(Uzbekistan) **Igor Sergeev**	Persepolis	1	–	–	1
41	(Portugal) **Ricardo Alves**	Sepahan	1	–	–	1
41	(Iran) Alireza Emamifar	Persepolis	–	1	–	1
41	(Iran) Esmaeil Halali	Persepolis	–	1	–	1
41	(Iran) Majid Basirat	Sepahan	–	1	–	1
41	(Iran) Ebrahim Asadi	Persepolis	–	1	–	1
41	(Iran) Farzad Ashoobi	Persepolis	–	1	–	1
41	(Iran) Maziar Zare	Persepolis	–	1	–	1
41	(Iran) Karim Ansarifard	Persepolis	–	1	–	1
41	(Iran) Mohammad Gholami	Sepahan	–	1	–	1
41	(Iran) Siamak Nemati	Persepolis	–	1	–	1
41	(Iran) Mohammad Daneshgar	Sepahan	–	1	–	1
41	(Iran) Milad Zakipour	Sepahan	–	1	–	1
41	(France) Steven Nzonzi	Sepahan	–	–	1	1

==== Top scorers by competition ====
Competition	Player	Club(s)	Goals
League	(Iran) Edmond Bezik	Persepolis Sepahan	6
Hazfi Cup	(Iran) Mahmoud Karimi Sibaki	Sepahan	3
Super Cup	(France) Steven Nzonzi	Sepahan	1

==== Most consecutive goalscoring ====
Friendly matches are not included in the following records unless otherwise noted.

Player	Club(s)	Consecutive matches	Total goals in the run	Start	End
(Iran) Rasoul Khatibi	Sepahan	3	5	2004–05 Iran Pro League (second leg)	2005–06 Iran Pro League (second leg)
(Iran) Mehdi Taremi	Persepolis	3	4	2016–17 Persian Gulf Pro League (first leg)	2017–18 Persian Gulf Pro League (first leg)
(Armenia) Levon Stepanyan	Sepahan	3		1996–97 Azadegan League (first leg)	1998–99 Azadegan League (first leg)
(Iran) Ali Alipour	Persepolis	3		2017–18 Persian Gulf Pro League (first leg)	2018–19 Persian Gulf Pro League (first leg)

==== Most clean sheets ====
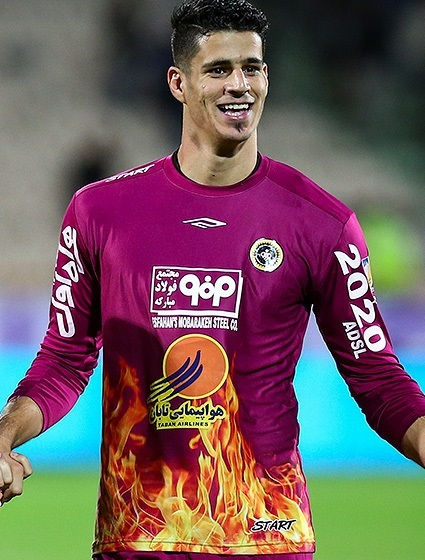
Payam Niazmand

- Players in **bold** are still active for Persepolis or Sepahan.

Player	Club(s)	Period	CS	Total
(Iran) **Payam Niazmand**	Sepahan Persepolis	2018–21, 2022–25 2025–Present	9 1	10
(Armenia) Armenak Petrosyan	Sepahan	1996–2003, 2005–07	8	8
(Iran) Bahram Mavaddat	Persepolis Sepahan	1973–76 1976–78	4 1	5
(Iran) Alireza Beiranvand	Persepolis	2016–20, 2022–24	5	5
(Iran) Davoud Fanaei	Persepolis	1998–2003	3	3
(Iran) Mehdi Rahmati	Sepahan	2004–05, 2009–11	3	3

==== Most consecutive clean sheets ====
Player	Club(s)	Consecutive matches	Start	End
(Iran) Bahram Mavaddat	Persepolis	4	1974–75 Takht Jamshid Cup (first leg)	1975–76 Takht Jamshid Cup (second leg)
(Armenia) Armenak Petrosyan	Sepahan	3	2000–01 Azadegan League (first leg)	2001–02 Iran Pro League (first leg)
(Iran) Payam Niazmand	Sepahan	3	2022–23 Persian Gulf Pro League (second leg)	2023–24 Persian Gulf Pro League (second leg)

=== Hat-tricks ===
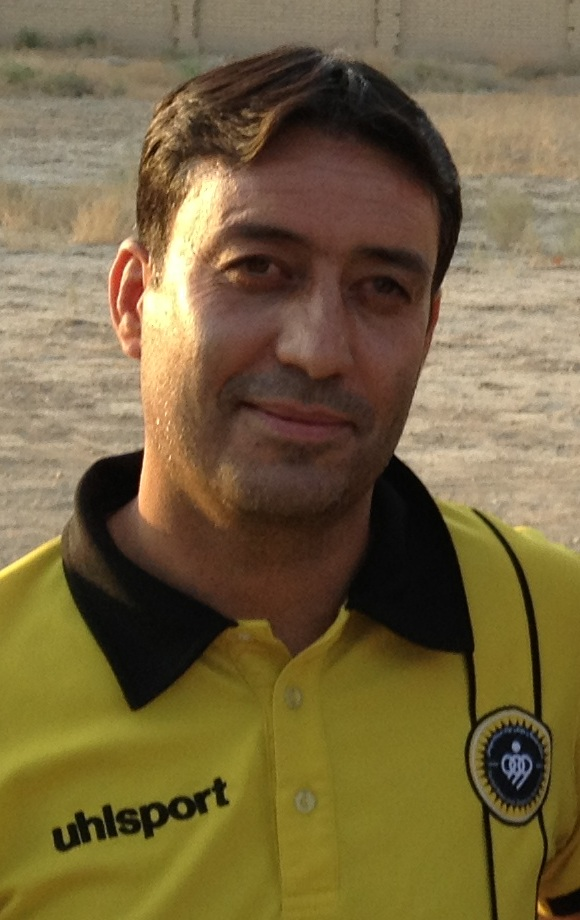
Mahmoud Karimi

A hat-trick is achieved when the same player scores three or more goals in one match.
Mahmoud Karimi is the only players to score a hat-trick in the history of the rivalry, achieving the feat during a Hazfi Cup match where his team played with nine players during extra time following two red cards.

Seq.	Player	Time of goals	For	Final score	Date	Tournament
1.	(Iran) Mahmoud Karimi Sibaki	108', 111', 117'	Sepahan	4–1 (A)	29 May 2007	2006–07 Hazfi Cup

=== Braces ===
A Brace is achieved when the same player scores two goals in one match. Listed in chronological order.

Seq.	Player	Time of goals	For	Final score	Date	Tournament
1.	(Iran) Homayoun Behzadi	11', 55'	Persepolis	6–0 (H)	19 March 1972	1971–72 Local League
2.	(Iran) Mohammad Dastjerdi	82', 85'	Persepolis	3–0 (H)	25 October 1974	1974–75 Takht Jamshid Cup
3.	(Iran) Nasser Mohammadkhani	5', 15'	Persepolis	3–0 (H)	9 August 1991	1991–92 Azadegan League
4.	(Iran) Edmond Bezik	39', 81'	Persepolis	3–1 (H)	22 February 1999	1998–99 Azadegan League
5.	(Iran) Amin Mousavi	67', 86'	Sepahan	2–0 (A)	19 April 2001	2000–01 Azadegan League
6.	(Iran) Edmond Bezik	40' (p.), 48'	Sepahan	3–3 (A)	30 September 2003	2003–04 Iran Pro League
7.	(Iran) Rasoul Khatibi	76', 90+2'	Sepahan	2–1 (A)	15 May 2005	2004–05 Iran Pro League
8.	(Iran) Rasoul Khatibi	30', 68'	Sepahan	3–2 (A)	23 December 2005	2005–06 Iran Pro League
9.	(Iran) Alireza Vahedi Nikbakht	45', 64'	Persepolis	3–2 (H)	26 October 2008	2008–09 Persian Gulf Cup
10.	(Iran) Mehdi Taremi	61', 74'	Persepolis	3–1 (H)	21 September 2016	2016–17 Persian Gulf Pro League
11.	(Georgia (country)) Giorgi Gvelesiani	12' (p.), 100' (p.)	Persepolis	4–2 (A)	22 February 2023	2022–23 Hazfi Cup

== Most successful coaches in rivalries ==
Friendly matches are not included in the following records unless otherwise noted.

Rank	Head coach	Club	Matches	Win	Lost	Win-Loss Differential	Winning rate
1	(England) Alan Rogers	Persepolis	4	4	0	+4	100%
2	(France) Patrice Carteron	Sepahan	4	4	0	+4	100%
3	(Iran) Hossein Faraki	Sepahan	3	3	0	+3	100%
4	(Iran) Ali Parvin	Persepolis	17	6	4	+2	35%
5	(Croatia) Branko Ivanković	Persepolis	10	4	2	+2	40%
6	(Brazil) Edson Tavares	Sepahan	2	2	0	+2	100%
7	(Iran) Yahya Golmohammadi	Persepolis	11	4	3	+1	36%
8	(Iran) Amir Ghalenoei	Sepahan	10	3	2	+1	30%
9	(Iran) (United States) Afshin Ghotbi	Persepolis	3	2	1	+1	66%
10	(Portugal) José Morais	Sepahan	5	2	1	+1	40%

Rules for classification: 1) Win-Loss Differential; 2) Number of Wins; 3) Winning rate; 4) Aggregate Goal Difference.

== General performances ==
=== Trophies ===
- Numbers with this background indicate the record in the competition.

Persepolis	Competition	Sepahan
Domestic
16	Iranian League	5
7	Iranian Hazfi Cup	5
5	Iranian Super Cup	1
—	Iran Championship Cup	1
28	Domestic aggregate	12
Asian
—	AFC Champions League Elite	—
1	Asian Cup Winners Cup	—
1	Asian aggregate	—
29	Total aggregate	12

=== General information ===
Titles	Persepolis	Sepahan
Club name after establishment	Persepolis Sport Club	Shahin Isfahan Sport Club
Founding date	Club: 22 November 1963; Football team: 21 March 1968	5 October 1953
Stadium	Azadi Stadium	Naghsh-e Jahan Stadium
Capacity	78,116	75,000
Number of seasons in League	41 (1 withdrew due to national commitments)	39 (1 relegated)
Most goals scored in a season in League	56 (1971–72, 1998–99)	67 (2009–10)
Most points in a season in League	68 (2023–24)	67 (2009–10, 2011–12)
Number of Double wins (League and Hazfi Cup)	3 (Note: 1998–99, 2018–19, 2022–23)	—
Most Consecutive League trophies	5 times in a row (Glut) (Note: 2016–17, 2017–18, 2018–19, 2019–20, 2020–21)	3 times in a row (Hat-trick) (Note: 2009–10, 2010–11, 2011–12)
Most Consecutive Hazfi Cup trophies	2 times in a row (Brace) (Note: 2009–10, 2010–11)	2 times in a row (Brace) (Note: 2005–06, 2006–07)

=== Awards ===
==== IFFHS award ====
The IFFHS Asian Player of the Year is an annual prize presented by International Federation of Football History & Statistics (IFFHS). It had originally been the predecessor of the AFC Player of the Year, but was revived in 2020.

Award	Persepolis	Sepahan
1st	0	0
2nd	1 (Note: Farshad Pious (1990))	0
3rd	0	0
Total	1	0

==== AFC award ====
The AFC Player of the Year is an annual prize presented by Asian Football Confederation (AFC). It is awarded to the Asian player who has the best performance at AFC club(s) in a calendar year.

Award	Persepolis	Sepahan
1st	0	0
2nd	2 (Note: Ali Karimi (2012), Alireza Beiranvand (2019))	0
3rd	0	0
Total	2	0

==== Best Footballer in Asia ====
Best Footballer in Asia is an annual association football award organized and presented by Titan Sports. It is awarded to the player who had the best performance for Asian football during the calendar year.

Award	Persepolis	Sepahan
1st	0	0
2nd	0	0
3rd	1 (Note: Alireza Beiranvand (2018))	0
Total	1	0

==== League performances awards ====
Award	Persepolis	Sepahan
Golden Boot	10 (Note: Hossein Kalani (1970–71, 1971–72), Safar Iranpak (1971–72), Farshad Pious (1991–92, 1994–95), Ali Daei (2003–04), Mohsen Khalili (2007–08), Mehdi Taremi (2015–16, 2016–17), Ali Alipour (2017–18))	6 (Note: Edmond Bezik (2002–03), Emad Mohammed (2009–10), Kiros Stanlley (2018–19), Sajjad Shahbazzadeh (2020–21), Shahriyar Moghanlou (2022–23, 2023–24))

== Notable matches ==
- Persepolis 2–1 Sepahan
  May 17, 2008

Persepolis won Sepahan in front of over 110’000 fans and became 2007–08 IPL champion. Mohsen Khalili scored a spectacular volley from 20 yards to give Persepolis the lead, But Ehsan Hajysafi equalised a few minutes later. With ninety minutes over, the injury time was nearly finished but Khalili again shot a deflected free-kick, Finding Karim Bagheri in the box. Bagheri turned and crossed the ball for Sepehr Heidari, who scored the second goal with a header to win the match for his team.

== See also ==
- Football in Iran
- Persepolis F.C.
- Sepahan F.C.
- Tehran Derby
- El Gilano
- Mashhad derby
- Isfahan Derby
- Esteghlal F.C.–Sepahan S.C. rivalry
- Persepolis F.C.–Tractor S.C. rivalry
- Major football rivalries
