= Hedayati =

Hedayati (Persian: هدایتی, literally "directional", "directorial") is a Persian and Dari surname. Notable people with the surname include:

- Hamid Hedayati (born 1976), Iranian footballer
- Hossein Hedayati, Iranian businessman
- Kamran Hedayati (1949–1996), Iranian Kurdish dissident
- Mohammad-Reza Hedayati, Iranian actor
