= Joílson da Silva =

Brazilian athletics competitor

Personal information
- Born: Joílson Bernardo da Silva; 29 August 1987 (age 39) Fortaleza, Brazil

Sport
- Country: Brazil
- Sport: Athletics
- Events: Middle & Long-distance running
Medal record
Pan American Games
Bronze medal – third place	2011 Guadalajara	5000 m
South American Games
Silver medal – second place	2014 Santiago	5000 m

Joílson Bernardo da Silva (born 29 August 1987) is a Brazilian former athlete who specialised in middle and long-distance running events.

A native of Fortaleza, de Silva started training in athletics as a 15-year old on the streets of his local neighbourhood, running bare-foot as he couldn't afford to buy sneakers. Once he was picked up by a state government program he began training on tracks. In 2004 he was the South American Youth Champion in the 3000 metres event. His best result in senior athletics was a third-place finish in the 5000 metres at the 2011 Pan American Games in Guadalajara, where he edged out Mexico's Juan Carlos Romero by two hundredths of a second to claim the bronze medal.
