= Steel Azin Iranian Holding Co. =

- Native name: (استیل آذین ایرانیان (سهامی عام; Estil-e Âzin-e Iranian (Shami-ye 'lâm)
- Company type: Public limited company
- Industry: Power generation, energy, petrochemicals, steel, agribusiness, construction, investment, sport and leisure.
- Founder: Hossein Hedayati
- Key people: Hossein Hedayati (Group Chairman)
- Website: steelazinholding.ir

Steel Azin Iranian Holding Co. is an Iranian holding company headquartered in Tehran, Iran. The company engages in the power generation, energy, petrochemicals, steel, agribusiness, construction, investment and sport and leisure sectors.

== Main subsidiaries and operations ==
- Steel Azin Co. — Decor
- Nayband Bay Agroindustrial Co. — Largest shrimp farm complex in the Persian Gulf region
- MABDA Drinking Water - Mineral water production
- Electric power generation — including a combined cycle power plant in Damghan, Semnan
- Bitumen production — Factory located in Eshtehard Industrial Zone (Karaj County, Alborz Province)
- Steel Azin Cultural & Athletic Club — with football, futsal and wrestling teams
- Steel Azin Iranian Applied Science University
