= 2007–08 Azadegan League =

17th season of Azadegan League

Azadegan League
- Season: 2007–08
- Champions: Foolad Khuzestan; Payam Khorasan
- Promoted: Foolad Khuzestan; Payam Khorasan
- Top goalscorer: Mohammad Parvin (17 goals)

The 2007–08 Azadegan League was the 17th season of the League and seventh as the second highest division since its establishment in 1991.

Following are the standings for the 2007–08 football season in the Azadegan League.

== Standings ==
=== Group 1 ===
| Pos | Team | Pld | W | D | L | GF | GA | GD | Pts | Qualification or relegation |
|---|---|---|---|---|---|---|---|---|---|---|
| 1 | Steel Azin | 22 | 11 | 5 | 6 | 41 | 28 | +13 | 38 | Azadegan League 2007–08 Play Off |
| 2 | Payam Khorasan | 22 | 11 | 5 | 6 | 29 | 21 | +8 | 38 | Azadegan League 2007–08 Play Off |
| 3 | Niroye Zamini | 22 | 10 | 7 | 5 | 26 | 19 | +7 | 37 | |
| 4 | Tractor Sazi | 22 | 7 | 10 | 5 | 23 | 19 | +4 | 31 | |
| 5 | Gol Gohar | 22 | 8 | 7 | 7 | 25 | 24 | +1 | 31 | |
| 6 | Sorkhpooshan | 22 | 7 | 10 | 5 | 19 | 20 | −1 | 31 | |
| 7 | Sh. Bandar Abbas | 22 | 7 | 8 | 7 | 26 | 21 | +5 | 29 | |
| 8 | Damash Lorestan | 22 | 7 | 7 | 8 | 24 | 26 | −2 | 28 | |
| 9 | Moghavemat Mersad | 22 | 7 | 7 | 8 | 23 | 25 | −2 | 28 | |
| 10 | Kaveh Zanjan | 22 | 6 | 8 | 8 | 18 | 18 | 0 | 26 | |
| 11 | Shamoushak | 22 | 7 | 4 | 11 | 19 | 28 | −9 | 25 | Relegation to 2008-09 Iran Football's 2nd Division |
| 12 | Shahin Ahvaz | 22 | 4 | 2 | 16 | 20 | 44 | −24 | 14 | Relegation to 2008-09 Iran Football's 2nd Division |

=== Group 2 ===
| Pos | Team | Pld | W | D | L | GF | GA | GD | Pts | Qualification or relegation |
|---|---|---|---|---|---|---|---|---|---|---|
| 1 | Foolad Khuzestan | 22 | 13 | 5 | 4 | 33 | 15 | +18 | 44 | Azadegan League 2007–08 Play Off |
| 2 | Sepahan Novin | 22 | 11 | 7 | 4 | 28 | 18 | +10 | 40 | Azadegan League 2007–08 Play Off |
| 3 | Tarbiat Yazd | 22 | 11 | 4 | 7 | 36 | 29 | +7 | 37 | |
| 4 | Mes Rafsanjan | 22 | 9 | 7 | 6 | 34 | 26 | +8 | 34 | |
| 5 | Nassaji Mazandaran | 22 | 10 | 4 | 8 | 27 | 30 | −3 | 34 | |
| 6 | Sh. Tabriz | 22 | 7 | 6 | 9 | 20 | 23 | −3 | 27 | |
| 7 | Etka Gorgan | 22 | 6 | 8 | 8 | 28 | 34 | −6 | 26 | |
| 8 | Shahin Bushehr | 22 | 6 | 7 | 9 | 22 | 24 | −2 | 25 | |
| 9 | Kowsar Tehran | 22 | 5 | 10 | 7 | 21 | 25 | −4 | 25 | |
| 10 | Sanaye Arak | 22 | 6 | 5 | 11 | 19 | 24 | −5 | 23 | |
| 11 | Machine Sazi | 22 | 3 | 12 | 7 | 15 | 25 | −10 | 21 | Relegation to 2008-09 Iran Football's 2nd Division |
| 12 | Homa | 22 | 4 | 7 | 11 | 17 | 27 | −10 | 19 | Relegation to 2008-09 Iran Football's 2nd Division |

== Top goal scorers ==
15

- (Iran) Mohammad Parvin (Steel Azin)

=== Group A ===
15

- (Iran) Mohammad Parvin (Steel Azin)

11

- (Iran) Mohammad Pourmand (Moghavemat Shiraz)

10

- (Iran) Hadi Norouzi (Damash)

9

- (Iran) Abbas Assadi (Shahrdari Bandar Abbas)
- (Iran) Ghasem Salmani (Shahin Ahvaz)

8

- (Iran) Ali Karimi (Sorkhpooshan)
- (Iran) Jahangir Asgari (Niroye Zamini)

7

- (Iran) Iman Razaghirad (Steel Azin)
- (Iran) Ali Zadali (Payam Mashhad)
- (Iran) Asghar Rameshgar (Teraktor Sazi)

=== Group B ===
13

- (Iran) Behnam Beyranvand (Tarbiat Yazd)

9

- (Iran) Mobin Derakhshan (Etka)

8

- (Iran) Mohammad Azizi (Mes Rafsanjan)

7

- (Iran) Mohammadali Hamzeie (Sepahan Novin)
- (Iran) Esmaeil Alishirazi (Etka)
- (Iran) Hadi Khodadadi (Nassaji)

6

- (Iran) Milad Davoudi (Mes Rafsanjan)
- (Iran) Mohammad Ghazi (Foolad)

== Play Off ==
| Payam Khorasan | 0 – 0 | Foolad |

Samen

| Foolad | 1 – 1 | Payam Khorasan |

Takhti

| Sepahan Novin | 0 – 0 | Steel Azin |

Isfahan

| Steel Azin | 1 – 2 | Sepahan Novin |

Tehran
