= Ebrahim Shakouri =

Iranian footballer (born 1984)

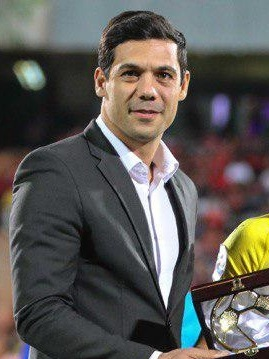
- Shakouri in 2019

Personal information
- Full name: Ebrahim Shakouri Shouredeli
- Date of birth: 16 February 1984 (age 42)
- Place of birth: Tehran, Iran
- Height: 1.84 m (6 ft 0 in)
- Position: Left back

Team information
- Current team: Persepolis (executive chairman)

Youth career
- 2001–2004: Saipa

Senior career*
| Years | Team | Apps | (Gls) |
| 2004–2008 | Saipa | 21 | (1) |
| 2008–2009 | Payam Khorasan | 28 | (1) |
| 2009–2012 | Persepolis | 53 | (1) |
| 2012–2017 | Saipa | 111 | (2) |
- * Club domestic league appearances and goals

Ebrahim Shakouri (Persian: ابراهيم شكورى, born 16 February 1984) is an Iranian former football who played as a left-back. He is former general secretary of Iran Football Federation and current Executive Chairman of Persepolis Football Club.

== Career ==
Shakouri was born in Tehran, Iran. He was a regular player in 2008–09 season for Payam and moved to Persepolis in June 2009. He usually played on the left.

== Career statistics ==
- Last Update: 15 May 2015

| Club performance | | | League | | Cup | | Continental | | Total | |
| Season | Club | League | Apps | Goals | Apps | Goals | Apps | Goals | Apps | Goals |
| Iran | | | League | | Hazfi Cup | | Asia | | Total | |
|---|---|---|---|---|---|---|---|---|---|---|
| 2004–05 | Saipa | Pro League | 1 | 0 | 0 | 0 | – | – | 1 | 0 |
| 2005–06 | Saipa | Pro League | 3 | 0 | 0 | 0 | – | – | 3 | 0 |
| 2006–07 | Saipa | Pro League | 17 | 1 | 0 | 0 | – | – | 17 | 1 |
| 2007–08 | Saipa | Pro League | 0 | 0 | 0 | 0 | 0 | 0 | 0 | 0 |
| 2008–09 | Payam | Pro League | 28 | 1 | 2 | 0 | – | – | 30 | 1 |
| 2009–10 | Persepolis | Pro League | 14 | 0 | 3 | 0 | – | – | 17 | 0 |
| 2010–11 | Persepolis | Pro League | 16 | 0 | 4 | 0 | 2 | 0 | 21 | 0 |
| 2011–12 | Persepolis | Pro League | 23 | 1 | 1 | 0 | 1 | 0 | 25 | 1 |
| 2012–13 | Saipa | Pro League | 29 | 0 | 1 | 0 | – | – | 30 | 0 |
| 2013–14 | Saipa | Pro League | 27 | 1 | 1 | 0 | – | – | 28 | 1 |
| 2014–15 | Saipa | Pro League | 27 | 1 | 2 | 0 | – | – | 29 | 1 |
| Career total | | Pro League | 184 | 5 | 14 | 0 | 3 | 0 | 201 | 5 |

== Honours ==
Saipa

- Iranian Football League: 2006–07

Persepolis

- Hazfi Cup: 2009–10, 2010–11
