= Esmaeil Haj Rahimipour =

Iranian footballer

Personal information
- Full name: Abbas Kargar
- Date of birth: September 7, 1951 (age 75)
- Place of birth: Tehran, Iran
- Position: Midfielder

Senior career*
Years	Team	Apps	(Gls)
1970–1978	Persepolis	164	(28)

International career
1973–1975	Iran	2	(0)
- * Club domestic league appearances and goals

Esmaeil Haj Rahimipour is an Iranian former footballer who played as a midfielder for Persepolis and the Iran national football team.

== Effectiveness in Derby ==
In the Tehran derby on 7 September 1973 between Persepolis and Taj (now known as Esteghlal), Haj Rahimipour was influential on 5 goals. The match finished 6–0 in favor of Persepolis.
