= Mohsen Khalili =

Iranian footballer and manager

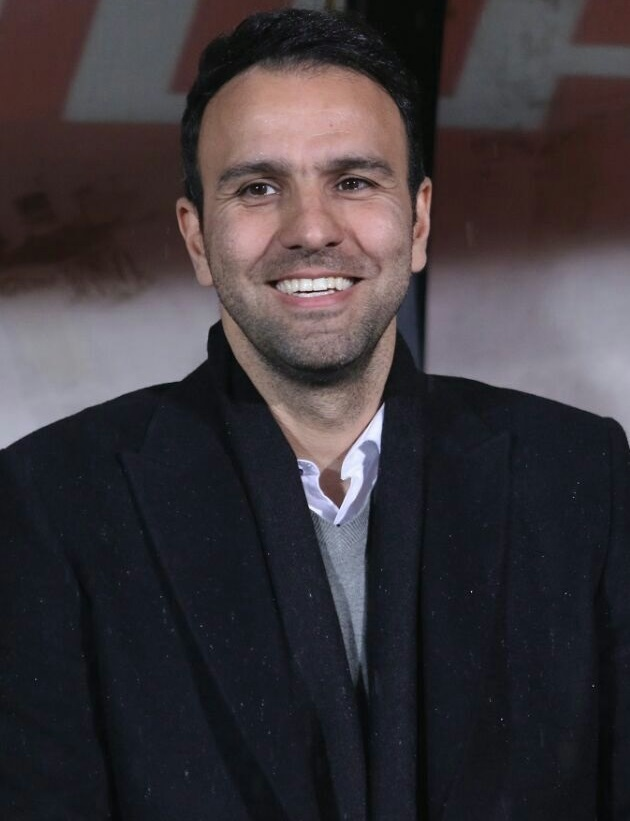

Personal information
- Full name: Mohsen Khalili
- Date of birth: 14 February 1981 (age 45)
- Place of birth: Tehran, Iran
- Height: 6 ft 0 in (1.83 m)
- Position: Striker

Team information
- Current team: Persepolis (team manager)

Youth career
- 1997–1999: Pas

Senior career*
Years	Team	Apps	(Gls)
1999–2007	Saipa	156^{1}	(62)
2007–2010	Persepolis	77	(38)
2010–2011	Steel Azin	18	(7)
2012	Mes	12	(4)
2012	Saba	16	(5)

International career^{‡}
2007–2010	Iran	12	(1)
- * Club domestic league appearances and goals as of 6 June 2012 ‡ National team caps and goals as of 30 December 2009^1 Apps and Caps only Includes Iran Pro League onwards

Mohsen Khalili (Persian: محسن خلیلی, born 14 February 1981) is a retired Iranian football forward.

== Club career ==
=== Saipa ===
He Played for Saipa for several seasons, helping the team win the Iran Professional League in the 2006/07 season, scoring 8 goals. He was the team's second topscorer after Ali Daei.

=== Persepolis ===
In June 2007 he signed a 2-year deal with Iranian giants Persepolis for a reported fee of $300,000. He scored a spectacular curler against Bargh Shiraz. This was followed by a stunning volley in the last match of the league against Sepahan, a game which ended 2-1 thanks to Sepehr Heidari's extra time goal.

During the 2007/08 season Khalili became the top goalscorer by scoring 18 goals during the Persian Gulf Cup which persepolis won at the end. Hadi Asghari from Rah Ahan also scored 18 goals and finished in the top as well but because Asghari had scored a few goals from the penalty spot, people and critics called Khalili the real top goalscorer. Khalili was the only player in Persepolis who played in all of the regular season games and he became really close with the fans especially after each goal he scored, he would be the only one to be celebrating with the fans.

On 2 July 2008, he renewed his contract with Persepolis despite having better financial offers from UAE clubs. Because of the injury during the training camp of Team Melli in August 2008 he was out for 9 months. During the 2008/09 season, Khalili made his return on 3 March 2009, in a 2–1 home defeat against Moghavemat but he scored his first goal since his return against Paykan on 12 April. He also scored in Persepolis's last group stage match in the AFC Champions League against Al Shabab to take Persepolis through to the Round of 16 as the top team. The next season, he was benched in first half of the season by then coach Zlatko Kranjcar but in the second half of the season with changes in the coaching staff, new coach Ali Daei who had been his coach at Saipa F.C. trusted him and he was a regular in the team. He scored the last goal in the Hazfi Cup final against Gostaresh Foolad F.C. thus also scoring the last goal of the season. In the summer break in an interview Ali Daei said that he did not need him anymore and a few days later the club announced that they could not reach an agreement with the player and were not renewing his contract.

=== After Persepolis ===
He joined Steel Azin in Summer 2010 and stayed there for a season but again injuries did not allow him to become a regular player and after the relegation of the team his contract was automatically canceled. He joined Mes Kerman in January 2012 and halfway through the season after he missed the first half because of the injury he had and was one of the regular players of the team. He joined Saba in Summer 2012. He was released by Saba in December 2012 after the appointment of Samad Marfavi as the new coach.

=== Club career statistics ===
As of 13 May 2013

Club performance			League		Cup		Continental		Total	
Season	Club	League	Apps	Goals	Apps	Goals	Apps	Goals	Apps	Goals
Iran			League		Hazfi Cup		Asia		Total	
2001–02	Saipa	Pro League	2	1			—	—		
2002–03	Saipa	Pro League	5	0			—	—		
2003–04	Saipa	Pro League	7	1			—	—		
2004–05	Saipa	Pro League	11	1			—	—		
2005–06	Saipa	Pro League	26	7	0	0	—	—	26	7
2006–07	Saipa	Pro League	23	8	1	0	—	—	24	8
2007–08	Persepolis	Pro League	34	18	3	0	—	—	37	18
2008–09	Persepolis	Pro League	5	1	0	0	2	1	7	2
2009–10	Persepolis	Pro League	18	6	6	4	—	—	24	10
2010–11	Steel Azin	Pro League	18	0	2	0	—	—	20	0
2011–12	Mes	Pro League	12	1	0	0	—	—	12	1
2012–13	Saba	Pro League	3	0	0	0	—	—	3	0
Career total			164	44			2	1		

- Assist Goals

Season	Team	Assists
06–07	Saipa	1
07–08	Persepolis	1
09–10	Persepolis	3
10–11	Steel Azin	0
11-12	Mes Kerman	1

== International career ==
In June 2007, Mohsen Khalili was called up to join the Iran national football team in the 2007 West Asian Football Federation Championship but as he was injured he did not make an appearance.

In January 2008 he made his debut for Iran in a friendly match against Qatar. In March 2008 when Ali Daei became Iran's coach, Khalili was called up to the national team again for a friendly Match against Bahrain and a World Cup qualifying match against Kuwait. Khalili scored his 1st international goal on 14 June 2008 when he made the final score 2–0 against Syria in Iran's 2010 World Cup Qualification match. He was invited again by Afshin Ghotbi in January 2010 and played in 2011 AFC Asian Cup qualification.

=== International goals ===
Scores and results list Iran's goal tally first.

#	Date	Venue	Opponent	Score	Result	Competition
1	14 June 2008	Abbasiyyin Stadium, Damascus	Syria	2-0	2-0	2010 FIFA World Cup qualification

He has scored against Esteghlal 6 times in 5 matches in a row.

== Honours ==
- Iran's Premier Football League
  - Winner: 2
    - 2006/07 with Saipa
    - 2007/08 with Persepolis
- Hazfi Cup
  - Winner: 1
    - 2009/10 with Persepolis

=== Individual ===
- Iran's Premier Football League top goalscorer: 1
  - 2007/08 with Persepolis, 18 goals shared with Hadi Asghari
- Football Iran News & Events
  - Player of the year (2007/08), Persepolis
  - Striker of the year (2007/08), Persepolis
- Iran Football Federation Award
  - Goalscorer of the year (2007/08), Persepolis, shared with Hadi Asghari
