= Mehdi Kiani =

Mehdi Kiani may refer to:

- Mehdi Kiani (footballer, born 1987), Iranian footballer
- Mehdi Kiani (footballer, born 1978), Iranian footballer
