= Jahangir Asgari =

Iranian footballer

Personal information
- Full name: Jahangir Asgari
- Date of birth: November 22, 1986 (age 39)
- Place of birth: Darreh Shahr, Iran
- Position: Forward

Youth career
- 2000–2007: Niroye Zamini

Senior career*
Years	Team	Apps	(Gls)
2007–2008	Niroye Zamini	?	(8)
2008–2011	Paykan	77	(13)
2011–2012	Damash	24	(4)
2012–2013	Rah Ahan	15	(2)
2013–2014	Damash	2	(0)
2014–2015	Paykan	0	(0)
2015–2016	Pas Hamedan		
- * Club domestic league appearances and goals as of 10 May 2014

Jahangir Asgari (born November 22, 1986) is an Iranian footballer who plays as a forward.

== Club career ==
After playing at First Division club Niroye Zamini, Asgari joined Paykan F.C. in Iran Pro League in 2008. He was the best goal scorer of the season for Paykan on 2010–2011 season but that could not help Paykan and club was relegated to lower division. After Payakn was relegated to First Division he signed a two-year contract with Damash Gilan, which newly promoted to the Iran Pro League.

Club performance			League		Cup		Continental		Total	
Season	Club	League	Apps	Goals	Apps	Goals	Apps	Goals	Apps	Goals
Iran			League		Hazfi Cup		Asia		Total	
2007–08	Niroye Zamini	Division 1	?	8			-	-		
2008–09	Paykan	Pro League	27	3			-	-		
2009–10	Paykan	Pro League	17	3			-	-		
2010–11	Paykan	Pro League	33	7	1	0	-	-	34	7
2011–12	Damash	Pro League	24	4	2	0	-	-	26	4
2012–13	Rah Ahan	Pro League	15	2	0	0	-	-	15	0
Career total			116	27			0	0		

- Assist Goals

Season	Team	Assists
10-11	Paykan	0
11-12	Damash Gilan	0
