= Mohammad Mehdi Elhaei =

Iranian football player

Personal information
- Full name: Mohammad Mehdi Elhaei
- Date of birth: July 17, 1992 (age 34)
- Place of birth: Ahvaz, Iran
- Height: 1.70 m (5 ft 7 in)
- Position: Midfielder

Team information
- Current team: Sanat Naft
- Number: 32

Youth career
- 2008–2012: Persepolis
2010–2011	Persepolis B		
2012–2015	Sanat Naft	24	(8)
- Persepolis

International career^{‡}
Years	Team	Apps	(Gls)
2008–2009	Iran U17	15	(3)
- ‡ National team caps and goals as of 12 September 2010

Mohammad Mehdi Elhaei (Persian: محمدمهدی الهایی, born July 17, 1992, in Ahvaz) is an Iranian football player that currently plays in Sanat Naft in the Iran Pro League. He is an Iranian Arab.

== Club career ==
He played his first match for Persepolis in 2008–09 season.

=== Club career statistics ===
As of 20 February 2011

Club performance			League		Cup		Continental		Total	
Season	Club	League	Apps	Goals	Apps	Goals	Apps	Goals	Apps	Goals
Iran			League		Hazfi Cup		Asia		Total	
2008–09	Persepolis	Pro League	1	0	0	0	0	0	0	0
2009–10	Persepolis	Pro League	0	0	0	0	–		0	0
2010–11	Persepolis	Pro League	0	0	0	0	0	0	0	0
2011–12	Persepolis	Pro League	0	0	0	0	0	0	0	0
2012–13	Sanat Naft	Pro League	0	0	0	0	–		0	0
Career Total			1	0	0	0	0	0	0	0

- Assist Goals

Season	Team	Assists
08-09	Persepolis	0
09-10	Persepolis	0
10-11	Persepolis	0
11-12	Persepolis	0
12-13	Sanat Naft	0

== Honours ==
- Hazfi Cup
  - Winner: 2
    - 2009/10 with Persepolis
    - 2010/11 with Persepolis
