= Asghar Talebnasab =

Iranian footballer

Personal information
- Full name: Asghar Talebnasab
- Date of birth: September 20, 1982 (age 44)
- Place of birth: Tehran, Iran
- Position: Midfielder

Team information
- Current team: Pas Hamedan F.C.

Senior career*
Years	Team	Apps	(Gls)
–2005	Sepahan		
2005–2007	Esteghlal	45	(0)
2007–2008	PAS Hamedan	2	(0)
2007–2008	→ Shahrdari Bandar Abbas (loan)		
2008–2009	PAS Hamedan	5	(0)
- * Club domestic league appearances and goals as of May 2009

Asghar Talebnasab (Persian: اصغر طالب نسب, born September 20, 1982) is an Iranian football player. He played for the IPL club PAS Hamedan as a midfielder.
