= Hadi Asghari =

Iranian footballer

Personal information
- Full name: Hadi Asghari
- Date of birth: 12 May 1981 (age 45)
- Place of birth: Salmas, Iran
- Position: Striker

Team information
- Current team: Shahrdari Urmia F.C.
- Number: 9

Youth career
- Perspolis
- Rah Ahan

Senior career*
Years	Team	Apps	(Gls)
2005–2008	Rah Ahan	81	(34)
2008–2009	Sepahan	20	(4)
2009–2010	Pas Hamedan	29	(10)
2010–2011	Saba Qom	30	(4)
2011–2012	Gostaresh	7	(1)
2012–2013	Aboomoslem	21	(7)
2013–2014	Esteghlal Ahvaz	4	(0)
2014–2015	Shahrdari Urmia	8	(0)
- * Club domestic league appearances and goals as of 22 April 2015(UTC) ‡ National team caps and goals as of August 24, 2008 (UTC)

Hadi Asghari (Persian: هادی اصغری, born 12 May 1981) is an Iranian football striker who currently plays for Shahrdari Urmia F.C. in the Iran Football's 2nd Division. He became the top goalscorer in Iran Pro League in 2007–08 season along with Mohsen Khalili.

== Club career ==
He became the top scorer of the league in 2007–08 season with Mohsen Khalili with 18 goals and moved to Sepahan from Rah Ahan under Amir Ghalenoei management in summer 2008 but had a difficult season where he was mostly used as the substitute and moved for the 2009–10 season to Pas. He had a good performance in Pas, where he played in most of games starting in 27 games and scored 10 goals.

=== Club career statistics ===
Last Update 16 November 2012

Club performance			League		Cup		Continental		Total	
Season	Club	League	Apps	Goals	Apps	Goals	Apps	Goals	Apps	Goals
Iran			League		Hazfi Cup		Asia		Total	
2005–06	Rah Ahan	IPL	25	8			–	–		
2006–07	Rah Ahan	IPL	23	8			–	–		
2007–08	Rah Ahan	IPL	33	18			–	–		
2008–09	Sepahan	IPL	20	4			2	1		
2009–10	Pas	IPL	29	10		0	–	–		10
2010–11	Saba	IPL	30	4	1	0	–	–	31	4
2011–12	Gostaresh	Div 1	7	1			–	–	7	1
2011–12	Aboomoslem	Div 1	12	3			–	–	12	3
2012–13	Aboomoslem	Div 1	9	4	0	0	–	–	9	4
Total	Iran		188	60			2	1		
Career total			188	60			2	1		

Season	Team	Assists
05–06	Rah Ahan	1
07–08	Rah Ahan	3
08–09	Sepahan	2
09–10	Pas	1
10–11	Saba	1

== International career ==
He was called to Team Melli after his success in 2007–08 and becoming the top scorer of the league but could not feature in any match.
