= Mohammad Parvin =

Iranian former footballer (born 1988)

Personal information
- Full name: Mohammad Parvin
- Date of birth: 14 June 1988 (age 38)
- Place of birth: Tehran, Iran
- Height: 1.75 m (5 ft 9 in)
- Positions: Midfielder; winger

Youth career
- 2002–2007: Persepolis

Senior career*
Years	Team	Apps	(Gls)
2005–2007	Persepolis	14	(0)
2007–2008	Steel Azin	22	(15)
2008–2009	Saipa	12	(0)
2008	→ Dunajská Streda (loan)	13	(2)
2009–2011	Persepolis	13	(1)
2011–2012	Paykan	19	(2)
2012–2013	Gahar Zagros	20	(2)
2013–2014	Parseh	19	(2)
Total		132	(24)

International career^{‡}
2002	Iran U17		
2008	Iran	1	(0)
Medal record
Representing Iran
West Asian Football Federation Championship
Gold medal – first place	2008 Iran	Team competition
- * Club domestic league appearances and goals as of 10 May 2013 ‡ National team caps and goals as of 12 August 2008

Mohammad Parvin (Persian: محمد پروين; born 14 June 1988) is an Iranian former footballer who played as a midfielder. He retired in 2014. He is the son of legendary Iranian footballer Ali Parvin.

== Club career ==
Mohammad Parvin began his career at the Persepolis youth academy in Tehran before signing his first pro contract in 2005. Despite the fact that his father was the head coach of the team, he remained unused until making his debut in a friendly match against German giants Bayern Munich. Being dubbed as a future star player in the national team, his time at Persepolis turned difficult following his fathers departure as a coach. He later followed his Parvin senior, who had become technical director of Steel Azin, and became the top scorer in the first division. Following a remarkable season in a star-studded second-tier side, he chose to move soon, again shortly after his fathers resignation. Despite reportedly being offered a contract by Persepolis, he moved to Saipa. After only 12 performances at Saipa, he spent 6 successful months on loan at Dunajská Streda in Europe only to return to his beloved Persepolis in July 2009. His second stint at the continents most popular football team, was another difficult experience and Mohammad was on the move once again in 2011. His next stop was Paykan, another short term stint as soon newly promoted Gahar Zagros followed.

It is often argued that his lackluster performance and much traveled resume is a result of the pressure that comes along the name of Parvin, and his fathers publicized involvement in Iranian football.

=== Club career statistics ===
Last Update: 10 May 2013

Club performance			League		Cup		Continental		Total	
Season	Club	League	Apps	Goals	Apps	Goals	Apps	Goals	Apps	Goals
Iran			League		Hazfi Cup		Asia		Total	
2005–06	Persepolis	Pro League	2	0	0	0	-	-	2	0
2006–07	Persepolis	Pro League	12	0	3	0	-	-	15	0
2007–08	Steel Azin	Division 1	22	15	2	0	-	-	24	15
2008–09	Saipa	Pro League	12	0	0	0	2	0	14	0
Slovakia			League		Slovak Cup		Europe		Total	
2008–09	Dunajská Streda	Corgoň liga	13	2	0	0	-	-	13	2
Iran			League		Hazfi Cup		Asia		Total	
2009–10	Persepolis	Pro League	8	1	0	0	-	-	8	1
2010–11	Persepolis	Pro League	5	0	1	0	0	0	6	0
2011–12	Paykan	Division 1	19	2	0	0	-	-	19	2
2012–13	Gahar Zagros	Pro League	8	1	0	0	-	-	8	1
Total	Iran		90	19	6	0	2	0	98	19
Total	Slovakia		13	2	0	0	-	-	13	2
Career total			103	21	6	0	2	0	111	21

- Assist Goals

Season	Team	Assists
06–07	Persepolis	1
08–09	Saipa	6
09–10	Persepolis	0
10–11	Persepolis	0

== International career ==
After becoming the top scorer in first division he was called to Team Melli in July 2008 and played in WAFF Championship 2008.

== Honours ==
=== Club ===
Persepolis

- Hazfi Cup (2): 2009–10, 2010–11

=== Individual ===
- Azadegan League top goalscorer (1): 2007–08 with Steel Azin (15 goals)
