= Hossein Hedayati =

Iranian businessman

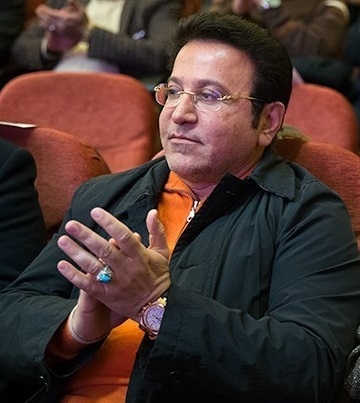
- Hedayati in January 2016
- Born: Tehran, Iran
- Citizenship: Iranian
- Occupations: Founder, Chairman and CEO of Steel Azin Iranian Holding Co. Owner of Steel Azin F.C.
- Military career
- Branch: Revolutionary Guards

Hossein Hedayati is an Iranian business tycoon who most notably purchased Steel Azin F.C. and invested into Persepolis F.C.

== Football ==
Hedayati gained popularity among a large group of football fans in Iran, but he was never a part of the club Persepolis F.C. Yet he invested large sum of money into the prominent club just as a supporter. He has also been the owner of Steel Azin F.C. since 2007. While always a controversial figure for his unknown background, there has never been a doubt about his influence on Iranian football. After his takeover of Ekbatan FC he transformed a struggling Azadegan League side, into a dominant force in the Persian Gulf Cup. That team also included Ali Karimi who was often the cause of trouble at the club. Following a dispute with the then team CEO, Sardar Hajilou, Ali Karimi was punished for an indefinite time. Hedayati did not want to kick him out of the club due to their friendship.Hedayati was sentenced to 20 years in prison in May 2019 for disrupting the country's economic system through illicit wealth acquisition.
