= Tiago Fraga =

Brazilian footballer

Personal information
- Full name: Tiago Alves Fraga
- Date of birth: 2 March 1981 (age 45)
- Place of birth: Anápolis, Goiás, Brazil
- Height: 1.79 m (5 ft 10 1/2 in)
- Position: Midfielder

Team information
- Current team: Goiânia

Senior career*
Years	Team	Apps	(Gls)
1999–2005	Goiás	80	(4)
2006–2007	Naval 1º de Maio	19	(2)
2007	Figueirense		
2007	Paulista		
2008	Aparecidense		
2008	CRAC-GO		
2009	Mixto	1	(0)
2009–2011	Persepolis	39	(3)
2012	PAS Hamedan	14	(6)
2013	São José-SP	4	(0)
2014	CRAC-GO		
2014–	Goiânia		
- * Club domestic league appearances and goals as of 25 April 2014

Tiago Alves Fraga (born 2 March 1981 in Anápolis, Brazil), sometimes known as just Tiago is a Brazilian professional footballer who plays as attacking midfielder for CRAC.

== Career ==
On 13 July 2009 Tiago signed a two-year deal with Iran Pro League side Persepolis, along with fellow Brazilian Wésley Brasilia. He became a regular player at the end of the season and even scored the first goal in the final of Hazfi Cup.

=== Club Career statistics ===
Last Update: 3 May 2016

Club performance			League		Cup		Continental		Total	
Season	Club	League	Apps	Goals	Apps	Goals	Apps	Goals	Apps	Goals
Iran			League		Hazfi Cup		Asia		Total	
2009–10	Persepolis	Persian Gulf Cup	21	1	5	1	-	-	26	2
2010–11	Persepolis	Persian Gulf Cup	18	2	1	0	2	0	21	2
2011–12	Pas Hamedan	Azadegan League	14	6	0	0	-	-	14	6
Total	Iran		53	9	6	1	2	0	61	10
Career total			53	9	6	1	2	0	61	10

== Honours ==
- Hazfi Cup
  - Winner: 2
    - 2009/10 with Persepolis
    - 2010/11 with Persepolis
