= Armenak Petrosyan =

Armenian footballer (born 1973)

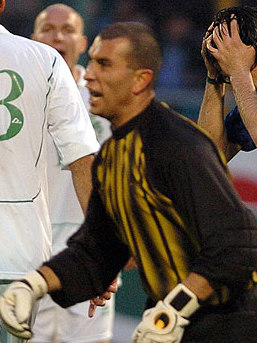

Personal information
- Full name: Armenak Petrosyan
- Date of birth: 13 November 1973 (age 52)
- Place of birth: Yerevan, Soviet Union
- Height: 1.80 m (5 ft 11 in)
- Position: Goalkeeper

Senior career*
Years	Team	Apps	(Gls)
1993–1996	Ararat Yerevan	89	(0)
1996–2003	Sepahan	113	(0)
2003–2005	Zob Ahan	72	(0)
2005–2007	Sepahan	42	(0)
2007–2008	Shahrdari Bandar Abbas	26	(0)

International career^{‡}
1994–1996	Armenia	7	(0)
- * Club domestic league appearances and goals as of 16 February 2007 ‡ National team caps and goals as of 12 May 2007

Armenak Petrosyan (Armenian: Արմենակ Պետրոսյան, born on 13 November 1973 in Yerevan, Soviet Union) is a retired Armenian football player. He was a goalkeeper and captain of the Iranian Premier League side Sepahan Esfahan. He was also a goalkeeper for the Armenia national team.

== Club career ==
Armenak was the goalkeeper of FC Ararat Yerevan as a youngster, but soon moved to Iran, where he spent most of his career at Sepahan Esfahan. He also played for another Esfahani club, Zob Ahan, for two seasons. In 2007, he joined the Azadegan League club F.C. Shahrdari Bandar Abbas.

== International career ==
Armenak made 7 appearances for Armenia, debuting in 1994 against the United States. The match against the USA was Armenia's second match after its independence, so Armenak was one of the first goalkeepers to play for Armenia as an independent country.

== Achievements ==
- Armenian Premier League with Ararat Yerevan: 1993
- Armenian Cup with Ararat Yerevan: 1993, 1994, 1995
- Iran Championship with Sepahan: 2003
- Iranian Cup with Sepahan: 2006
