= Steel Azin F.C. =

Iranian football club

Steel Azin
- Full name: Steel Azin Football Club
- Founded: 2007; 19 years ago
- Dissolved: 2012; 14 years ago
- Ground: Shahid Dastgerdi Stadium; Tehran
- Capacity: 8,250
- Owner: Hossein Hedayati
- League: Iran Football's 3rd Division
Home colours	Away colours

Steel Azin Football Club (Persian: باشگاه فوتبال استيل آذین, Bashgah-e Futbal-e Estil Âzin) was an Iranian football club based in Tehran, Iran. The club was owned by Hossein Hedayati, owner of Steel Azin Iranian Holding Co. Steel Azin club also had a volleyball team, sponsored by the same company, which competed in the Iranian Volleyball Super League.

== History ==
=== A new era ===
Ekbatan FC was re-established by two of its former players, Rabti & Ghani, in the late 1990s. Moving up the Iranian football ladder year after year, the team reached the Azadegan League in 2003. The team was able to avoid relegation for two consecutive years, but lack of financial resources made the club hot favorites for relegation. Following two dismal years, in the summer of 2005, the club was sold by Rabti & Ghani to an Iranian construction tycoon living abroad.

Following their takeover, the new ownership group of the club announced a new era, vowing to invest in youth football. The first move was a shuffle on the bench. Rabti was replaced by his assistant coach, and was made Technical Director. Ghani remained Club manager in the new Club structure modeled after German teams - it included the owner as the club chairman. The club's pre- season included a month-long stay in Dubai and matches against Sharjah Wanderers Club, Fabexi FC and Al Nasr SC. With the new investments, a trip to Dubai and a place to call home (Shahid Dastgerdi Stadium), Ekbatan was tipped as a possible promotion candidate.

Once the season started though, it took only three weeks for the coach to be replaced and Rabti was reinstated as head coach. The club's dismal start to the season continued, which saw them at the bottom of the standings by mid season despite a remarkable 1–0 win over league leaders Pegah F.C. who suffered their first defeat of the season. The club continued a losing run and Rabti was sacked with 5 games left, though he would remain on the board until the end of the season. Team scout and Ekbatan legend Hadi Ahangaran was given the task of fighting relegation and keeping the club in the league. This proved a successful appointment, and the club narrowly beat the drop after beating Nozhan in the relegation play off match, played in Esfahan. In preparation for the next season, Ekbatan made some high-profile changes to the backroom staff including Farhad Kazemi as "special advisor to the Board". Former Paykan FC assistant coach under Farhad Kazemi, Mohsen Garousi was named head coach and Ebrahim Vatanikia, one of the countries most renowned youth coaches, as head of the youth academy. Major changes in the team followed, with only 6 players remaining from the previous season, and this time, the club set their sights on a more modest mid table finish.

The club's start to the season though was anything but, as Garousi was sacked after losing all of the first seven games. His replacement Asghar Sharafi signed on a two-year deal and promised to keep the club in the second division. Despite a five match winning streak, the team was not able to make up for their terrible start to the season, finishing in 9th place- only a four-point improvement from the previous season. Shortly after, speculation began on the club's future. While the senior team had not enjoyed much success during the past two seasons, the club had proven successful with its ambitious plans for the youth academy. Vatanikia also affirmed the support of the board by praising them in an interview after winning numerous titles with Ekbatan's academy.

=== Hedayati's takeover ===
On April 30, 2007, Iranian multi millionaire Hossein Hedayati bought Ekbatan and renamed it to Steel Azin. With strong financial support and an ambitious owner, Steel Azin promised to be the new heavyweights in Iranian football.

=== Youth academy ===
Ekbatan was known for having one of the best youth academies in Iranian football and had introduced a number of talented players to Iranian football. It was one of the youngest teams in the Azadegan League, with an age average of 23 in the season prior to the takeover of Hossein Hedayati. Following the takeover, Steel Azin's youth academy was completely recreated by former Iranian national team coach Heshmat Mohajerani.

=== Iran Pro League ===
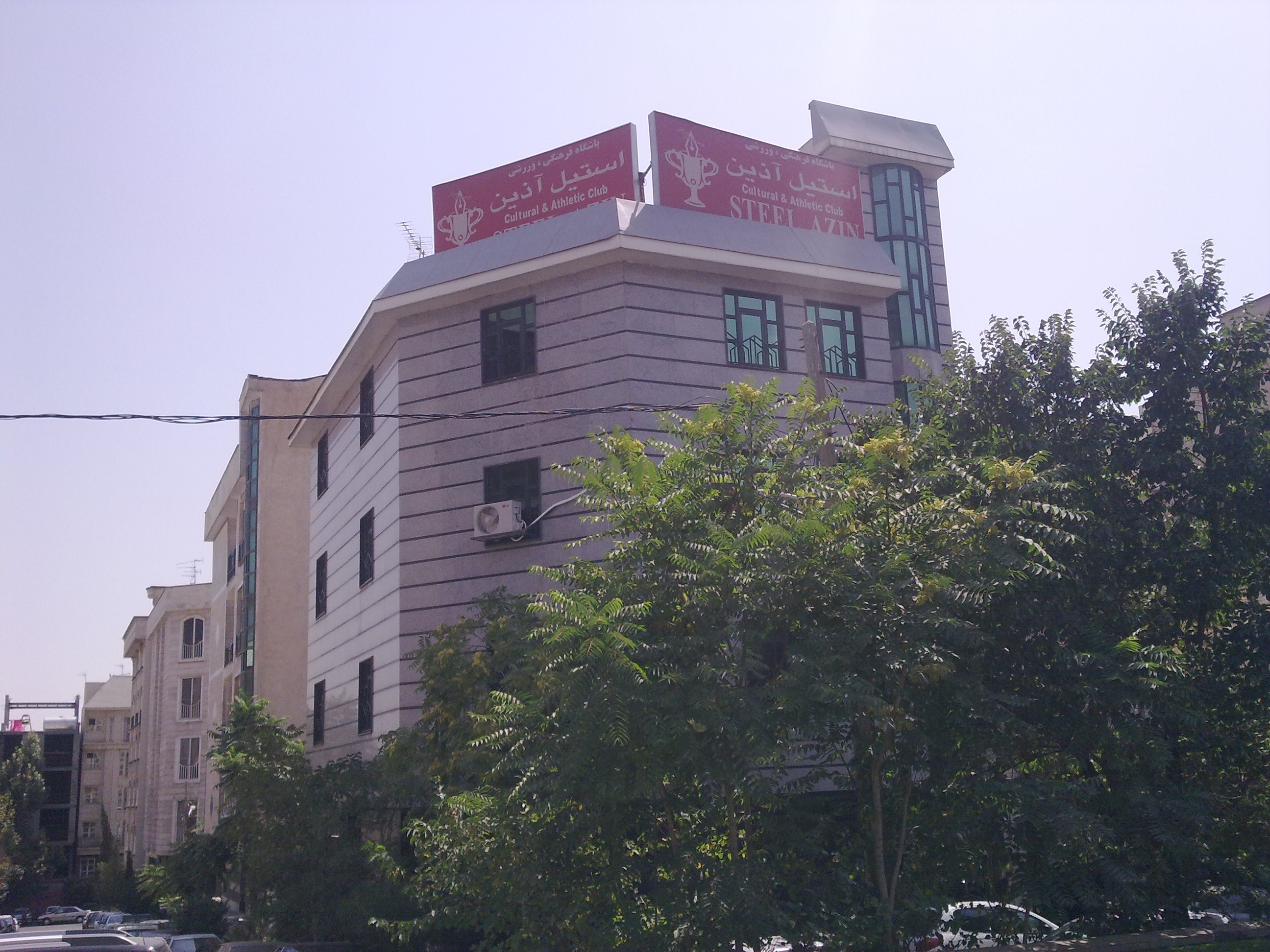
Steel Azin F.C. Headquarters in Tehran

Hossein Hedayati went on an unprecedented shopping spree as he brought the biggest names in Iranian football to his second-tier football club of Steel Azin. Players included national team goalkeeper Ebrahim Mirzapour, Davoud Fanaei, Hamed Kavianpour, Ali Ansarian and Mohammad Parvin. Iranian football legend Ali Parvin was installed as Technical director while former Esteghlal and Cameroon assistant coach Theo de Jong became head coach. Heshmat Mohajerani was named director of the youth academy. The huge media buzz and the stars who were brought in, did not prove successful as they were not able to gain promotion to the Premier League. Mohammad Parvin finished as top scorer following a number of impressive appearances.

The following year, after a major big names load off, the club was narrowly promoted to the Premier League. Following promotion to the top tier, the heavy investments once again commenced. Star signings followed and even foreign based players like Lek Kcira, Leonard Kweuke and Iranians Ferydoon Zandi and Amir Shapourzadeh. The player who caused for the biggest media attention though, was Ali Karimi who joined from rivals Persepolis. Despite all of this, Steel Azin's first season in the Iranian Premier League was a disaster, as the club finished in fifth place, with the blame put largely on their defence.

In the 2010/2011 season, Steel Azin had a nightmare season. With numerous Managerial and coaching changes, the club was bottom of the table for nearly all of the 34 weeks. Ali Karimi's contract was terminated and he moved to German giants Schalke 04, Ali Parvin returned to the club, the controversial fair play saga against their bitter rivals Persepolis F.C., all didn't help prevent a disastrous fall into the second tier of Iranian football. The season ended after a 6–1 home defeat against Shahrdari Tabriz F.C. meaning the star-studded Tehran club finished the season in rock bottom, despite reported investments of nearly $40mil. by owner Hossein Hedayati.

Due to the poor results, major investments, and a star-studded lineup, the nickname of "FC Hollywood" was given to the club by the media. This was also due to the fact that players seemed to be enjoying themselves with their large salaries, rather than playing as would be expected of them. The club were often referred to as the "Galacticos of Iran" during their first season in the Premier League which was more successful. The controversial refusal to continue playing following the Tehran derby against Persepolis, was later withheld and the club agreed to play the last four matches. Steel Azin were relegated two weeks prior to the end of the season.

Following their relegation into the Azadegan League, Steel Azin moved from Tehran to Semnan. The former Zob Ahan general manager was appointed as the new CEO of the club. The club was relegated from the first division. The following year, Steel Azin finished in 10th place but was later fined by FIFA and docked 12 points which led to their relegation to the third division. Steel Azin dissolved in 2012, playing their last season in the third tier of Iranian football.

== Season-by-season ==
The table below chronicles the achievements of the club in the League and Hazfi Cup since 2005.

Season	League									Hazfi Cup	Leagues Top goalscorer		Manager(s)
Season	Division	P	W	D	L	F	A	Pts	Pos	Hazfi Cup	Name(s)	Goals	Manager(s)
2005–06	Div 1	22	4	9	9	20	28	21	10th	First Round	Hossein Vaez	6	Mohammad Rabti/ Hadi Ahangaran
2006–07	Div 1	22	6	7	9	13	24	25	9th	First Round	Mohammad Siah	10	Mohsen Garousi/ Asghar Sharafi
2007–08	Div 1	22	11	5	6	41	28	38	3rd	1/8 Final	Mohammad Parvin	15	de Jong/ Jan Verheijen/ Kazemi
2008–09	Div 1	26	17	4	5	49	30	55	1st	1/8 Final	Hadi Khodadadi	10	Nader Dastneshan
2009–10	IPL	34	13	13	8	55	49	52	5th	Quarterfinal	Ali Karimi	14	Estili/ Peyrovani
2010–11	IPL	34	6	10	18	30	63	28	18th	Quarterfinal	Siavash Akbarpour; Mohammad Gholami	9	Tumbaković/ Peyrovani/ Khakpour/ Yavari
2011–12	Div 1	26	10	10	6	29	22	28	10th	Third Round	Hamid Kazemi	11	Afazeli/ Kheirandish
2012–13	Div 2	26	10	6	10	26	24	36	7th	First Round	Farid Behzad	10	Kheirandish

=== Key ===
- P = Played
- W = Games won
- D = Games drawn
- L = Games lost
- F = Goals for
- A = Goals against
- Pts = Points
- Pos = Final position
- IPL = Iran Pro League
- Div 1 = Azadegan League

Champions	Runners-up	Promoted	Relegated

== Sponsorship ==
=== Official sponsor ===
The official club sponsor is Steel Azin Co, which is also owned by Hossein Hedayati. Under the previous ownership, Fabexi LLC was the main sponsor.

=== Kit providers ===
- 2005/06: Aghili
- 2006/07: Farhad
- 2007/08: Daei
- 2009/10: Majid
- 2010/11: Shekari / Umbro / Majid
- 2011/12: Merooj

== Managers ==
Name	Nat	From	To
Mohamad Rabti	(Iran)	September 2006	December 2006
Hadi Ahangaran	(Iran)	December 2006	May 2006
Mohsen Garousi	(Iran)	June 2006	September 2006
Asghar Sharafi	(Iran)	September 2006	June 2007
Theo de Jong	(Netherlands)	June 2007	December 2007
Jan Verheijen (Temp)	(Netherlands)	December 2007	December 2007
Farhad Kazemi	(Iran)	December 2007	July 2008
Nader Dastneshan	(Iran)	July 2008	June 2009
Hamid Reza Estili	(Iran)	June 2009	April 2010
Afshin Peyrovani (Temp)	(Iran)	April 2010	July 2010
Ljubiša Tumbaković	(Serbia)	July 2010	October 2010
Afshin Peyrovani	(Iran)	October 2010	December 2010
Mohammad Khakpour	(Iran)	December 2010	February 2011
Mahmoud Yavari	(Iran)	April 2011	June 2011
Human Afazeli	(Iran)	June 2011	June 2012
