= Wésley Brasilia =

Brazilian footballer

Personal information
- Full name: Wésley Braz de Almeida
- Date of birth: 7 May 1981 (age 45)
- Place of birth: Luziânia, Goiás, Brazil
- Height: 1.73 m (5 ft 8 in)
- Position: Forward

Senior career*
Years	Team	Apps	(Gls)
1998–2001	Vila Nova		
2002–2003	Santo André		
2003–2004	União Barbarense	14	(7)
2004	Londrina		
2005	Celaya	23	(9)
2006	Paulista FC		
2007	Dibba Al-Hisn		
2007	América-RN	18	(7)
2008	Sporting Cristal	17	(9)
2008	Sinop		
2009	Brasiliense	5	(3)
2009–2010	Persepolis	14	(2)
2011	Daejeon Citizen	1	(0)
2011	Rio Verde	5	(2)
2012	Campinense	3	(1)
2013	CRAC	7	(3)
2013	Deportivo Ayutla		
2014	Atlético Ceilandense		
2014	CAP Uberlândia		
2014	Marathón		
2015	Anápolis		
2015	Atlético Marte		
2015	Brasília		
2016	Taguatinga		
2017	Sociedade Esportiva Santa Maria		
2018	Formosa		
2018–?	Botafogo-DF		
- * Club domestic league appearances and goals

Wésley Braz de Almeida (born 7 May 1981), better known as Wésley Brasilia, is a Brazilian former professional footballer who played as a forward..

He has a prolonged experience in international football. In his extensive career he has played for Celaya of Mexico, Daejeon Citizen of South Korea, Marathón in Honduras, Atlético Marte in El Salvador and Persepolis of Iran.

However, in his native Brazil he has had a more extensive career, but of lower profile that in foreign football, having played for Londrina, Santo André, Brasiliense, Rio Verde, CRAC, CAP Uberlândia and in teams of even lower profile like Taguatinga, Taguatinga, Sociedade Esportiva Santa Maria and Botafogo-DF.

== Career statistics ==
Club performance			League		Cup		League Cup		Continental		Total	
Season	Club	League	Apps	Goals	Apps	Goals	Apps	Goals	Apps	Goals	Apps	Goals
Iran			League		Hazfi Cup		League Cup		Asia		Total	
2009–10	Persepolis	Persian Gulf Cup	14	2	0	0	–		0	0	14	2
South Korea			League		KFA Cup		League Cup		Asia		Total	
2011	Daejeon Citizen	K-League	1	0	0	0	1	0	0	0	2	0
Total	Iran		14	2	0	0	–		0	0	14	2
Total	South Korea		1	0	0	0	1	0	0	0	2	0
Career total			15	2	0	0	1	0	0	0	16	2

== Honours ==
Persepolis

- Hazfi Cup: 2009–10
