= 2026–27 Persepolis W.F.C. season =

Persepolis (Women)
2026–27 season
- President: Peyman Haddadi
- Head coach: Niloofar Ardalan (from 2 August 2026)
- Stadium: Shahid Kazemi Stadium
- Kowsar Women's League: 1st
- Top goalscorer: Zahra Ghanbari (3); Mohaddeseh Zolfi (3); Somayeh Esmaeili (3)
- Biggest win: 4–0 vs Malavan
- Biggest defeat: 1–4 vs Bam Khatoon
Home colours	Away colours
- All statistics correct as of 16 November 2026.

The 2026–27 season is the second season of Persepolis W.F.C. in the Kowsar Women's League.

== Kits ==
- Supplier: (Iran) Yousef Jameh
- Sponsors: Asan Pardakht, Daria Hamrah

Home	Away	Goalkeeper 1	Goalkeeper 2

== Technical staff ==
=== Ardalan staff ===
Position	Staff
Head coach	(Iran) Niloofar Ardalan
Assistant coach	(Iran) Tahereh Mobarra
Assistant coach and Analyzer	(Iran) Shaghayegh Faskhoudi
Doctor	(Iran) Maryam Najafi
Physiotherapists	(Iran) Maral Esmaeilinia (Iran) Maryam Manavi
Massage therapists	(Iran) Elmira Alipour (Iran) Sepideh Ghasemnejad
Team Manager	(Iran) Paria Chekani
Team Supervisor	(Iran) Shirin Nasiri
Media Officer	(Iran) Zeinab Manjiri
Support	(Iran) Sahar Jafari

== Players ==
=== First team ===
No.	Pos.	Nat.	Name	Age	Since	App.	Goals	Ends	Signed from	Notes
Goalkeepers
1	GK	(Iran)	Zahra Khajavi	27	2025	16	0	2027	Eesta	
22	GK	(Iran)	Atena Tofigh	20	2025	5	0	2029	Ava	
40	GK	(Iran)	Samira Mohammadi	34	2025	5	0	2027	Eesta	
Defenders
2	DF	(Iran)	Kimia Abbaszadeh	—	2026	0	0	2028	Fara Isatis Karan	
4	DF	(Iran)	Zeinab Abbaspour	23	2025	21	3	2027	Khatoon	
5	DF	(Iran)	Elham Abdolrahmani	33	2025	14	0	2028	Taran	
8	DF	(Iran)	Behnaz Taherkhani	31	2026	5	0	2028	Malavan	
11	DF	(Iran)	Zahra Ahmadizadeh	29	2025	24	0	2027	Sepahan	Vice Captain
13	DF	(Iran)	Mohaddeseh Amiri	—	2026	14	0		Palayesh Gaz	
17	DF	(Iran)	Elaheh Afshardoust	—	2026	7	0	2028	Palayesh Gaz	
23	DF	(Iran)	Fatemeh Rezaei	—	2025	26	0	2028	Taran	
29	DF	(Iran)	Sepideh Taheri	21	2026	0	0		Fara Isatis Karan	
44	DF	(Iran)	Halaleh Abdollahi	29	2026	3	0		Ava	
79	DF	(Iran)	Kimia Abdi	25	2026	0	0		Yasam	
99	DF	(Iran)	Samaneh Ghamari	19	2025	22	1	2027	Ava	
Midfielders
9	MF	(Iran)	Zahra Ghanbari	34	2025	17	9	2026	Eesta	Captain
10	MF	(Iran)	Maedeh Birang	—	2026	8	0	2028	Gol Gohar	
14	MF	(Iran)	Maryam Safarastgoo	23	2024	31	0	2027	Fara Isatis Karan	
18	MF	(Iran)	Maryam Rahideh	30	2026	6	0	2028	Eesta	
71	MF	(Iran)	Marzieh Nikkhah	33	2026	6	2		Sepahan	
80	MF	(Iran)	Mahsa Alimadadi	29	2025	1	0	2028	Saipa (Futsal)	
Forwards
6	FW	(Iran)	Mohaddeseh Zolfi	21	2026	8	3	2028	Eesta	
7	FW	(Iran)	Fereshteh Karimi	37	2026	7	0		Foolad Hormozgan (Futsal)	
19	FW	(Iran)	Fatemeh Rezaei	20	2025	22	3	2028	Ava	
20	FW	(Iran)	Soheila Shirali	24	2025	13	0	2027	Taran	
21	FW	(Iran)	Fatemeh Safarastgoo	23	2024	31	11	2028	Fara Isatis Karan	
27	FW	(Iran)	Somayeh Avaj	—	2026	0	0	2027	Malavan	
77	FW	(Iran)	Somayeh Esmaeili	19	2026	8	3	2028	Palayesh Gaz	

Last updated: 16 November 2026.

=== Reserve team ===
No.	Pos.	Nat.	Name	Age	Since	App.	Goals	Ends	Signed from	Notes
12	GK	(Iran)	Parnaz Toulabi	16	2026	0	0		Hamedan Football Association	
15	—	(Iran)	Setia Khodaei	15	2026	0	0		Setaregan Ardalan	
16	FW	(Iran)	Yasna Ebadi	15	2026	1	0		Setaregan Ardalan	
24	—	(Iran)	Parmis Khabbazi	16	2026	0	0		Setaregan Ardalan	
—	—	(Iran)	Diana Behnamfard	15	2026	0	0		Paykan	

== Transfers ==
=== In ===
No.	Pos.	Nat.	Player	Moving from	Type	Fee	Date	Source
Summer
8	DF	(Iran)	Behnaz Taherkhani	(Iran) Malavan	Transfer	Free	18 August 2026	
18	MF	(Iran)	Maryam Rahideh	(Iran) Eesta Alborz	Transfer	Free	18 August 2026	
6	FW	(Iran)	Mohaddeseh Zolfi	(Iran) Eesta Alborz	Transfer	Free	18 August 2026	
27	FW	(Iran)	Somayeh Avaj	(Iran) Malavan	Transfer	Free	22 August 2026	
2	DF	(Iran)	Kimia Abbaszadeh	(Iran) Fara Isatis Karan	Transfer	Free	22 August 2026	
71	MF	(Iran)	Marzieh Nikkhah	(Iran) Sepahan	Transfer	Free	3 September 2026	
77	FW	(Iran)	Somayeh Esmaeili	(Iran) Palayesh Gaz Ilam	Transfer	Free	3 September 2026	
17	DF	(Iran)	Elaheh Afshardoust	(Iran) Palayesh Gaz Ilam	Transfer	Free	4 September 2026	
10	MF	(Iran)	Maedeh Birang	(Iran) Gol Gohar	Transfer	Free	4 September 2026	
44	DF	(Iran)	Halaleh Abdollahi	(Iran) Ava Tehran	Transfer	Free	5 September 2026	
13	DF	(Iran)	Mohaddeseh Amiri	(Iran) Palayesh Gaz Ilam	Transfer	Free	5 September 2026	
7	FW	(Iran)	Fereshteh Karimi	(Iran) Foolad Hormozgan (Futsal)	Transfer	Free	6 September 2026	
16	FW	(Iran)	Yasna Ebadi	(Iran) Setaregan Ardalan	Transfer	Free	26 September 2026	
15	—	(Iran)	Setia Khodaei	(Iran) Setaregan Ardalan	Transfer	Free	26 September 2026	
24	—	(Iran)	Parmis Khabbazi	(Iran) Setaregan Ardalan	Transfer	Free	26 September 2026	
—	—	(Iran)	Diana Behnamfard	(Iran) Paykan	Transfer	Free	26 September 2026	
12	GK	(Iran)	Parnaz Toulabi	(Iran) Hamedan Football Association	Transfer	Free	26 September 2026	

=== Out ===
No.	Pos.	Nat.	Player	Moving to	Type	Fee	Date	Source
Summer
10	FW	(Iran)	Fatemeh Ghasemi	(Iran) Sepahan	Transfer	Free	16 August 2026	
18	MF	(Iran)	Sana Sadeghi	(Iran) Sepahan	Transfer	Free	20 August 2026	
7	MF	(Iran)	Sahar Ramezani	(Iran) Eesta Alborz	Transfer	Free	31 August 2026	
20	FW	(Iran)	Somayeh Khorrami	(Iran) Malavan	Transfer	Free	10 September 2026	
12	GK	(Iran)	Negin Iranpour	(Iran) Varesh Nowshahr	Transfer	Free	—	
5	MF	(Iran)	Hedieh Hezarjaribi	(Iran) Varesh Nowshahr	Transfer	Free	—	
77	MF	(Iran)	Fatemeh Ardestani	(Iran) Padideh Sirjan	Transfer	Free	—	

== Pre-season and friendlies ==
=== Pre-season ===
Win Draw Loss Fixtures

10 September 2026 Friendly	Persepolis	4–0	Padideh Sirjan	Tehran
		Report		Stadium: Azadi Stadium No. 3

== Competitions ==
=== Overview ===
Competition	First match	Last match	Starting round	Record							
Competition	First match	Last match	Starting round	Pld	W	D	L	GF	GA	GD	Win %
Kowsar Women's League	18 September 2026		Matchday 1	8	6	0	2	14	7	+7	75.00
Total				8	6	0	2	14	7	+7	75.00

Last updated: 16 November 2026
Source: Competitions

=== Kowsar Women's League ===
==== League Table ====
Pos	Team	Pld	W	D	L	GF	GA	GD	Pts	Qualification or relegation
1	Persepolis	7	6	0	1	13	3	+10	18	Qualification for the 2027–28 AFC Women's Champions League stage
2	Gol Gohar	7	3	4	0	12	5	+7	13	
3	Esteghlal	7	4	1	2	12	10	+2	13	
4	Khatoon	5	3	2	0	16	2	+14	11	
5	Sepahan	6	3	1	2	8	3	+5	10	

Updated to match(es) played on 9 November 2026. Source: League Full Table
Rules for classification: 1) Points; 2) Head-to-head points; 3) Head-to-head goal difference; 4) Total goal difference; 5) Total goals scored; 6) Fair-play points.
(Note: Head-to-head record is used only after all the matches between the teams in question have been played).

==== Results summary ====
Overall								Home						Away					
Pld	W	D	L	GF	GA	GD	Pts	W	D	L	GF	GA	GD	W	D	L	GF	GA	GD
8	6	0	2	14	7	+7	18	4	0	1	7	5	+2	2	0	1	7	2	+5

==== Results by round ====
Round	1	2	3	4	5	6	7	8	9	10	11	12	13	14	15	16	17	18
Ground	H	A	H	A	H	A	H	H	A	A	H	A	H	A	H	A	A	H
Result	W	W	W	W	W	L	W	L										
Position	3	2	1	1	1	1	1	1										
Points	3	6	9	12	15	15	18	18										

Updated to match(es) played on 16 November 2026. Source: "iranleague".
A = Away; H = Home; W = Win; D = Draw; L = Loss

==== Matches ====
Win Draw Loss Postponed

18 September 2026 1	Persepolis	2–0	Ava	Tehran
17:00 IRST (UTC+03:30)	Abdollahi (yellow card) 31'; Ghanbari 57'; Nikkhah 84'	Report	Yahyaei (yellow card) 45+1'; Rezaei (yellow card) 66'; Khalili (yellow card) 82'	Stadium: Shahid Kazemi Stadium; Referee: Vajiheh Rafati

25 September 2026 2	Malavan	0–4	Persepolis	Rasht
16:00 IRST (UTC+03:30)	Khorrami (yellow card) 86'	Report	Rezaei 45+2'; Zolfi 56'; Esmaeili 63'; Nikkhah 90+3'	Stadium: Sardar Jangal Stadium; Referee: Solaleh Javadi

2 October 2026 3	Persepolis	1–0	Varesh	Tehran
16:30 IRST (UTC+03:30)	Ghanbari 45+7', (yellow card) 74'	Report		Stadium: Shahid Kazemi Stadium; Referee: Raheleh Pashabadi

16 October 2026 4	Palayesh Gaz	0–2	Persepolis	Ilam
14:00 IRST (UTC+03:30)		Report	Ghanbari 36'; Zolfi 39'; F. Safarastgoo (yellow card) 87'	Stadium: Takhti Stadium; Referee: Parand Pourmirzabeigi

28 October 2026 5	Persepolis	2–1	Esteghlal	Qods
15:00 IRST (UTC+03:30)	Rezaei 21'; Esmaeili 22'; Ghanbari (yellow card) 38'; Karimi (yellow card) 90+3'	Report	Azimi 58'	Stadium: Shohada-ye Shahr-e Qods Stadium; Referee: Aban Nasiri
Note: This match was originally scheduled for 23 October 2026, but was postponed due to a change in the venue from Shahid Kazemi Stadium to Shohada-ye Shahr-e Qods Stadium.

3 November 2026 6	Gol Gohar	2–1	Persepolis	Sirjan
15:00 IRST (UTC+03:30)	Alizadeh 25'; Chatrenoor 70'	Report	Zolfi 60'	Stadium: Imam Ali Stadium; Referee: Zahra Raeisi

9 November 2026 7	Persepolis	1–0	Sepahan	Tehran
15:00 IRST (UTC+03:30)	Esmaeili 55'	Report	Ghasemi (yellow card) 51'	Stadium: Shahid Kazemi Stadium; Referee: Raheleh Pashabadi

16 November 2026 8	Persepolis	1–4	Khatoon	Tehran
15:00 IRST (UTC+03:30)	Afshardoust (yellow card) 45+7'; Abbaspour 79'	Report	Hamoudi 15' (pen.); Sarbali 51'; Didar 55', 61'; Tamrian (yellow card) 81'	Stadium: Shahid Kazemi Stadium; Referee: Mahnaz Zokaee

23 November 2026 9	Eesta	v	Persepolis	Karaj
14:30 IRST (UTC+03:30)				Stadium: Enghelab Stadium

10	Ava	v	Persepolis	Tehran
--:-- IRST (UTC+03:30)

11	Persepolis	v	Malavan	Tehran
--:-- IRST (UTC+03:30)				Stadium: Shahid Kazemi Stadium

12	Varesh	v	Persepolis	Nowshahr
--:-- IRST (UTC+03:30)

13	Persepolis	v	Palayesh Gaz	Tehran
--:-- IRST (UTC+03:30)				Stadium: Shahid Kazemi Stadium

14	Esteghlal	v	Persepolis	Tehran
--:-- IRST (UTC+03:30)

15	Persepolis	v	Gol Gohar	Tehran
--:-- IRST (UTC+03:30)				Stadium: Shahid Kazemi Stadium

16	Sepahan	v	Persepolis	Isfahan
--:-- IRST (UTC+03:30)

17	Khatoon	v	Persepolis	Bam
--:-- IRST (UTC+03:30)

18	Persepolis	v	Eesta	Tehran
--:-- IRST (UTC+03:30)				Stadium: Shahid Kazemi Stadium

==== Score overview ====
Win Draw Loss

Opposition	Home score	Away score	Aggregate score
Ava	2–0		
Eesta			
Esteghlal	2–1		
Gol Gohar		1–2	
Khatoon			
Malavan		4–0	
Palayesh Gaz		2–0	
Sepahan	1–0		
Varesh	1–0		

== Statistics ==
=== Overall ===
No.	Pos.	Nat.	Name	Kowsar League	
No.	Pos.	Nat.	Name	Apps	Goals
Goalkeepers
1	GK	(Iran)	Zahra Khajavi	8	0
22	GK	(Iran)	Atena Tofigh	0	0
40	GK	(Iran)	Samira Mohammadi	0	0
Defenders
2	DF	(Iran)	Kimia Abbaszadeh	0	0
4	DF	(Iran)	Zeinab Abbaspour	1 (3)	1
5	DF	(Iran)	Elham Abdolrahmani	0	0
8	DF	(Iran)	Behnaz Taherkhani	(5)	0
11	DF	(Iran)	Zahra Ahmadizadeh	5 (1)	0
13	DF	(Iran)	Mohaddeseh Amiri	(2)	0
17	DF	(Iran)	Elaheh Afshardoust	7	0
23	DF	(Iran)	Fatemeh Rezaei	8	0
29	DF	(Iran)	Sepideh Taheri	0	0
44	DF	(Iran)	Halaleh Abdollahi	3	0
79	DF	(Iran)	Kimia Abdi	0	0
99	DF	(Iran)	Samaneh Ghamari	5	0
Midfielders
9	MF	(Iran)	Zahra Ghanbari	8	3
10	MF	(Iran)	Maedeh Birang	8	0
14	MF	(Iran)	Maryam Safarastgoo	8	0
18	MF	(Iran)	Maryam Rahideh	5 (1)	0
71	MF	(Iran)	Marzieh Nikkhah	(6)	2
80	MF	(Iran)	Mahsa Alimadadi	0	0
Forwards
6	FW	(Iran)	Mohaddeseh Zolfi	8	3
7	FW	(Iran)	Fereshteh Karimi	(7)	0
16	FW	(Iran)	Yasna Ebadi	(1)	0
19	FW	(Iran)	Fatemeh Rezaei	5	2
20	FW	(Iran)	Soheila Shirali	(3)	0
21	FW	(Iran)	Fatemeh Safarastgoo	1 (4)	0
27	FW	(Iran)	Somayeh Avaj	0	0
77	FW	(Iran)	Somayeh Esmaeili	8	3
Players left the club during the season
Updated: 16 November 2026

=== Goal scorers ===
Rank	No.	Pos.	Nat.	Name	Kowsar League
1	6	FW	(Iran)	Mohaddeseh Zolfi	3
1	9	MF	(Iran)	Zahra Ghanbari	3
1	77	FW	(Iran)	Somayeh Esmaeili	3
2	19	FW	(Iran)	Fatemeh Rezaei	2
2	71	MF	(Iran)	Marzieh Nikkhah	2
3	4	DF	(Iran)	Zeinab Abbaspour	1
Totals					14
Updated: 16 November 2026

=== Assists ===
Rank	No.	Pos.	Nat.	Name	Kowsar League
1	10	MF	(Iran)	Maedeh Birang	2
1	77	FW	(Iran)	Somayeh Esmaeili	2
2	6	FW	(Iran)	Mohaddeseh Zolfi	1
2	7	FW	(Iran)	Fereshteh Karimi	1
2	9	MF	(Iran)	Zahra Ghanbari	1
2	20	FW	(Iran)	Soheila Shirali	1
2	21	FW	(Iran)	Fatemeh Safarastgoo	1
2	23	DF	(Iran)	Fatemeh Rezaei	1
2	44	DF	(Iran)	Halaleh Abdollahi	1
Totals					11
Updated: 16 November 2026

=== Goalkeeping ===
Rank	No.	Nat.	Name	Kowsar League		
Rank	No.	Nat.	Name	Apps	GA	CS
1	1	(Iran)	Zahra Khajavi	8	7	5
2	22	(Iran)	Atena Tofigh	0	0	0
2	40	(Iran)	Samira Mohammadi	0	0	0
Totals				8	7	5
Last updated: 16 November 2026

=== Captains ===
Note: Numbers in parentheses indicate the number of times a player served as captain after the fixed captain was substituted.

Rank	No.	Pos.	Nat.	Name	Kowsar League
1	9	MF	(Iran)	Zahra Ghanbari	8
Totals					8
Updated: 16 November 2026

=== Disciplinary record ===
No.	Pos.	Nat.	Player	Kowsar League		
No.	Pos.	Nat.	Player	Yellow card	(yellow card) (yellow-red card)	Red card
7	FW	(Iran)	Fereshteh Karimi	1	0	0
9	MF	(Iran)	Zahra Ghanbari	2	0	0
21	FW	(Iran)	Fatemeh Safarastgoo	1	0	0
44	DF	(Iran)	Halaleh Abdollahi	1	0	0
Totals				5	0	0
Updated: 28 October 2026

Ordered by (red card) , (second yellow card) and (yellow card)
(yellow card) = Number of bookings; (second yellow card) = Number of sending offs after a second yellow card; (red card) = Number of sending offs by a direct red card.
