= 2025–26 Persepolis W.F.C. season =

Persepolis (Women)
2025–26 season
- President: Reza Darvish (until 18 October 2025); Peyman Haddadi (from 18 October)
- Head coach: Maryam Azmoon
- Stadium: Shahid Kazemi Stadium
- Kowsar League: 7th
- Top goalscorer: Zahra Ghanbari (6)
- Biggest win: 4–0 vs Yasam Kurdistan
- Biggest defeat: 0–3 vs Gol Gohar
Home colours	Away colours

The 2025–26 season is the Persepolis's first season in the Kowsar Women Football League. Persepolis secured its first promotion to the Kowsar Women Football League by winning the Iran Women's Football 1st Division League in the previous season.

== Kits ==
- Supplier: (Iran) Merooj
- Sponsors: Asan Pardakht, Daria Hamrah

Home	Away	Goalkeeper 1	Goalkeeper 2	Goalkeeper 3	Goalkeeper 4

== Technical staff ==
=== Azmoon staff ===
Position	Staff
Head coach	(Iran) Maryam Azmoon
Assistant coach	(Iran) Tahereh Mobarra
Assistant coach and Analyzer	(Iran) Shaghayegh Faskhoudi
Doctor	(Iran) Maryam Najafi
Physiotherapists	(Iran) Maral Esmaeilinia (Iran) Maryam Manavi
Massage therapists	(Iran) Elmira Alipour (Iran) Sepideh Ghasemnejad
Team Manager	(Iran) Shirin Nasiri
Media Officer	(Iran) Zeinab Manjiri
Photographer	(Iran) Ghazal Khoddam
Support	(Iran) Sahar Jafari

== Squad ==
No.	Pos.	Nat.	Name	Age	Since	App.	Goals	Ends	Signed from	Notes
Goalkeepers
1	GK	(Iran)	Samira Mohammadi	33	2025	5	0	2026	Eesta Alborz	
12	GK	(Iran)	Negin Iranpour	24	2025	0	0	2027	Malavan	
22	GK	(Iran)	Atena Tofigh	19	2025	5	0	2028	Ava Tehran	
54	GK	(Iran)	Zahra Khajavi	26	2025	8	0	2026	Eesta Alborz	
Defenders
4	DF	(Iran)	Zeinab Abbaspour	22	2025	17	2	2026	Bam Khatoon	
8	DF	(Iran)	Ghazaleh Salehipour	24	2025	2	0	2027	(Spain) Juventud de Torremolinos	
11	DF	(Iran)	Zahra Ahmadizadeh	28	2025	18	0	2026	Sepahan	5th Captain
23	DF	(Iran)	Fatemeh Rezaei	—	2025	18	0	2028	Taran Alborz	
24	DF	(Iran)	Elham Abdolrahmani	32	2025	14	0	2026	Taran Alborz	
80	DF	(Iran)	Mahsa Alimadadi	—	2025	1	0	2028	Saipa (Futsal)	
Midfielders
5	MF	(Iran)	Hedieh Hezarjaribi	—	2025	5	0	2028	Ava Tehran	
7	MF	(Iran)	Sahar Ramezani	32	2025	11	0	2027	Tam Isfahan	4th Captain
9	MF	(Iran)	Maryam Mohammadi	—	2025	11	1	2026	Esteghlal	
14	MF	(Iran)	Maryam Safarastgoo	22	2024	23	0	2027	Fara Isatis Karan	
17	MF	(Iran)	Soheila Shirali	23	2025	10	0	2027	Taran Alborz	
18	MF	(Iran)	Sana Sadeghi	25	2025	18	1	2026	Sepahan	Vice Captain
77	MF	(Iran)	Fatemeh Ardestani	30	2025	4	1	2026	Sepahan	
88	MF	(Iran)	Melika Bagherinasab	—	2025	5	0	2028	Taran Alborz	
Forwards
10	FW	(Iran)	Fatemeh Ghasemi	24	2024	22	7	2026	(Turkey) Ataşehir Belediyespor	3rd Captain
19	FW	(Iran)	Fatemeh Rezaei	19	2025	17	1	2027	Ava Tehran	
20	FW	(Iran)	Somayeh Khorrami	33	2025	12	1	2026	Taran Alborz	
21	FW	(Iran)	Fatemeh Safarastgoo	22	2024	26	11	2028	Fara Isatis Karan	
25	FW	(Iran)	Samaneh Ghamari	18	2025	17	1	2028	Ava Tehran	
27	FW	(Iran)	Nastaran Mohammadkhani	—	2025	7	0	2028	Malavan	
99	FW	(Iran)	Zahra Ghanbari	33	2025	9	6	2026	Eesta Alborz	Captain
Players left the club during the season
5	DF	(Iran)	Narjes Tayebi	18	2024	13	0	2028	Fara Isatis Karan	
13	DF	(Iran)	Mohaddeseh Amiri	—	2024	12	0	2026	Palayesh Gaz Ilam	
90	FW	(Iran)	Zeinab Khalili	—	2025	0	0	2027	Setaregan Salimi Tangestan	

Last updated: 10 February 2026.

== New Contracts ==
No.	Pos.	Nat.	Player	Contract length	Contract ends	Source
10	FW	(Iran)	Fatemeh Ghasemi	1 season	2026	
21	FW	(Iran)	Fatemeh Safarastgoo	3 seasons	2028	
14	MF	(Iran)	Maryam Safarastgoo	2 seasons	2027	
5	DF	(Iran)	Narjes Tayebi	3 seasons	2028	

== Transfers ==
=== In ===
No.	Pos.	Nat.	Player	Moving from	Type	Fee	Source
Summer
22	GK	(Iran)	Atena Tofigh	(Iran) Ava Tehran	Transfer	Free	
18	MF	(Iran)	Sana Sadeghi	(Iran) Sepahan	Transfer	Free	
11	DF	(Iran)	Zahra Ahmadizadeh	(Iran) Sepahan	Transfer	Free	
77	MF	(Iran)	Fatemeh Ardestani	(Iran) Sepahan	Transfer	Free	
4	DF	(Iran)	Zeinab Abbaspour	(Iran) Bam Khatoon	Transfer	Free	
1	GK	(Iran)	Samira Mohammadi	(Iran) Eesta Alborz	Transfer	Free	
8	DF	(Iran)	Ghazaleh Salehipour	(Spain) Juventud de Torremolinos	Transfer	Free	
9	MF	(Iran)	Maryam Mohammadi	(Iran) Esteghlal	Transfer	Free	
25	FW	(Iran)	Samaneh Ghamari	(Iran) Ava Tehran	Transfer	Free	
19	FW	(Iran)	Fatemeh Rezaei	(Iran) Ava Tehran	Transfer	Free	
20	FW	(Iran)	Somayeh Khorrami	(Iran) Taran Alborz	Transfer	Free	
7	MF	(Iran)	Sahar Ramezani	(Iran) Tam Isfahan	Transfer	Free	
27	FW	(Iran)	Nastaran Mohammadkhani	(Iran) Malavan	Transfer	Free	
24	DF	(Iran)	Elham Abdolrahmani	(Iran) Taran Alborz	Transfer	Free	
88	MF	(Iran)	Melika Bagherinasab	(Iran) Taran Alborz	Transfer	Free	
23	DF	(Iran)	Fatemeh Rezaei	(Iran) Taran Alborz	Transfer	Free	
17	MF	(Iran)	Soheila Shirali	(Iran) Taran Alborz	Transfer	Free	
80	DF	(Iran)	Mahsa Alimadadi	(Iran) Saipa (Futsal)	Transfer	Free	
12	GK	(Iran)	Negin Iranpour	(Iran) Malavan	Transfer	Free	
5	MF	(Iran)	Hedieh Hezarjaribi	(Iran) Ava Tehran	Transfer	Free	
90	FW	(Iran)	Zeinab Khalili	(Iran) Setaregan Salimi Tangestan	Transfer	Free	
Winter
99	FW	(Iran)	Zahra Ghanbari	(Iran) Eesta Alborz	Transfer	Free	
54	GK	(Iran)	Zahra Khajavi	(Iran) Eesta Alborz	Transfer	Free	

=== Out ===
No.	Pos.	Nat.	Player	Moving to	Type	Fee	Source
Summer
7	MF	(Iran)	Fatemeh Amiri	(Iran) Sepahan	Transfer	Free	
1	GK	(Iran)	Parisa Geravandi		Transfer	Free	
2	DF	(Iran)	Hanieh Taleghani	(Iran) Ava Tehran	Transfer	Free	
4	DF	(Iran)	Zahra Javanmardi	(Iran) Fara Isatis Karan	Transfer	Free	
5	DF	(Iran)	Nadia Bahmani	(Iran) Foolad	Transfer	Free	
8	FW	(Iran)	Sogand Raji	(Iran) Sepahan	Transfer	Free	
9	FW	(Iran)	Aida Sedaghatzadeh	(Iran) Fara Isatis Karan	Transfer	Free	
18	FW	(Iran)	Kiana Palizpisheh	(Iran) Ava Tehran	Transfer	Free	
19	MF	(Iran)	Matina Zamani	(Iran) Shabestan Rasht	Transfer	Free	
20	MF	(Iran)	Narges Gholamzadeh	(Iran) Arad Varzaesh Zagros	Transfer	Free	
23	MF	(Iran)	Aylar Gholami	(Iran) Ava Tehran	Transfer	Free	
24	MF	(Iran)	Zilan Moradi	(Iran) Academy Ghala Gian	Transfer	Free	
11	FW	(Iran)	Hajar Ghorbani	(Iran) Fara Isatis Karan	Transfer	Free	
26	MF	(Iran)	Zahra Pourrostami	(Iran) Bahman Behbahan	Transfer	Free	
30	DF	(Iran)	Helia Seiri	(Iran) Arad Varzaesh Zagros	Transfer	Free	
44	MF	(Iran)	Nazanin Zahra Ghasemi	(Iran) Shahbaz Faraz Soffeh	Transfer	Free	
98	GK	(Iran)	Zahra Khorram	(Iran) Shahbaz Faraz Soffeh	Transfer	Free	
99	GK	(Iran)	Hananeh Afradi	(Iran) Mehregan Pardis	Transfer	Free	
87	FW	(Iran)	Zhino Salehi	(Iran) Yasam Kurdistan	Transfer	Free	
6	DF	(Iran)	Mahdieh Mostafaei	(Iran) Toukan Maham Ayria	Transfer	Free	
12	GK	(Iran)	Mobina Khodadadi	(Iran) Ava Tehran	Transfer	Free	
17	MF	(Iran)	Baran Doostvandi	(Iran) Yasam Kurdistan	Transfer	Free	
90	DF	(Iran)	Zahra Omidi	(Iran) Ava Tehran	Transfer	Free	
5	DF	(Iran)	Narjes Tayebi	(Iran) Ava Tehran	Transfer	Free	
Winter
90	FW	(Iran)	Zeinab Khalili	(Iran) Ava Tehran	Transfer	Free	
13	DF	(Iran)	Mohaddeseh Amiri	(Iran) Palayesh Gaz Ilam	Transfer	Free	

== Pre-season and friendlies ==
=== Pre-season ===
Win Draw Loss Fixtures

29 August 2025 Friendly	Persepolis	4–0	Mehregan Pardis	Tehran
18:00 IRST (UTC+03:30)	Khorrami 10'; Ardestani 50'; Safarastgoo 72'; Alimadadi 80'	Report		Stadium: Shahid Kazemi Stadium

6 September 2025 Friendly	Persepolis	13–0	Montakhab Shemiranat	Tehran
	Mohammadi; Mohammadkhani; Ghasemi; Abbaspour; Sadeghi; Rezaei; Shirali; Safarastgoo; Ardestani; Khorrami	Report		Stadium: Shahid Kazemi Stadium

=== Friendlies ===
20 September 2025 Friendly	Persepolis	1–0	Varesh Nowshahr	Tehran
18:00 IRST (UTC+03:30)	Ghamari 90+3'	Report		Stadium: Shahid Kazemi Stadium

20 October 2025 Friendly	Persepolis	4–0	Toukan Maham Ayria	Tehran
15:30 IRST (UTC+03:30)	Mohammadkhani 7'; Rezaei 41'; Ghasemi 60'; Khalili 70'	Report		Stadium: Azadi Stadium No. 2

== Competitions ==
=== Overview ===
Competition	Record							
Competition	Pld	W	D	L	GF	GA	GD	Win %
Kowsar League	18	7	4	7	19	17	+2	38.89
Total	18	7	4	7	19	17	+2	38.89

Last updated: 10 February 2026
Source: Competitions

=== Kowsar Women Football League ===
==== League Table ====
Pos	Team	Pld	W	D	L	GF	GA	GD	Pts	Qualification or relegation
5	Palayesh Gaz Ilam	18	7	5	6	16	18	−2	26	
6	Sepahan	18	7	4	7	19	20	−1	25	
7	Persepolis	18	7	4	7	19	17	+2	25	
8	Ava Tehran	18	3	2	13	9	32	−23	11	
9	Fara Isatis Karan	18	2	1	15	15	52	−37	7	Relegation to 2026–27 Iran Women's Football 1st Division

Updated to match(es) played on 10 February 2026. Source: Iran Football League Organization - League Full Table
Rules for classification: 1) Points; 2) Head-to-head points; 3) Head-to-head goal difference; 4) Total goal difference; 5) Total goals scored; 6) Fair-play points.
(Note: Head-to-head record is used only after all the matches between the teams in question have been played).

==== Results summary ====
Overall								Home						Away					
Pld	W	D	L	GF	GA	GD	Pts	W	D	L	GF	GA	GD	W	D	L	GF	GA	GD
18	7	4	7	19	17	+2	25	4	2	3	10	6	+4	3	2	4	9	11	−2

==== Results by round ====
Round	1	2	3	4	5	6	7	8	9	10	11	12	13	14	15	16	17	18
Ground	A	H	A	H	A	A	H	A	H	H	A	H	A	H	H	A	H	A
Result	D	W	L	D	L	L	L	W	W	L	W	L	D	D	W	L	W	W
Position	5	3	5	6	7	7	7	7	7	7	7	7	7	7	7	7	7	7
Points	1	4	4	5	5	5	5	8	11	11	14	14	15	16	19	19	22	25

Updated to match(es) played on 10 February 2026. Source: "iranleague".
A = Away; H = Home; W = Win; D = Draw; L = Loss

==== Matches ====
Win Draw Loss Postponed

Date Round	Home	Score	Away	Location

12 September 2025 1	Eesta Alborz	0–0	Persepolis	Karaj
18:00 IRST (UTC+03:30)		report		Stadium: Enghelab Stadium; Referee: Sahar Bibak

19 September 2025 2	Persepolis	2–0	Fara Isatis Karan	Tehran
17:00 IRST (UTC+03:30)	Abbaspour 69', 90+2'	report		Stadium: Shahid Kazemi Stadium; Referee: Vajiheh Rafati

26 September 2025 3	Gol Gohar	3–0	Persepolis	Sirjan
19:00 IRST (UTC+03:30)	Chatrenoor 10', 69', 90+2'	report		Stadium: Imam Ali Stadium; Referee: Mahnaz Zokaee

3 October 2025 4	Persepolis	1–1	Palayesh Gaz Ilam	Tehran
16:00 IRST (UTC+03:30)	Ghasemi (penalty missed) 10'; Khorrami 84'	report	Morshedi 2'	Stadium: Shahid Kazemi Stadium; Referee: Raheleh Pashabadi

10 October 2025 5	Sepahan	2–0	Persepolis	Isfahan
15:00 IRST (UTC+03:30)	Alimardani 10', 60'	report		Stadium: Qods Stadium; Referee: Sahar Bibak

28 October 2025 6	Malavan	2–0	Persepolis	Bandar-e Anzali
15:00 IRST (UTC+03:30)	Jafarniya 8', 76'	report		Stadium: Sirous Ghayeghran Stadium; Referee: Mahnaz Zokaee

3 November 2025 7	Persepolis	0–1	Khatoon	Tehran
14:30 IRST (UTC+03:30)		report	Geraeli 61'	Stadium: Shahid Kazemi Stadium; Referee: Dorna Ghahremani

9 November 2025 8	Ava Tehran	0–1	Persepolis	Tehran
14:30 IRST (UTC+03:30)		report	Ghamari 12'	Stadium: Karegaran Stadium; Referee: Maedeh Jafari

16 November 2025 9	Persepolis	4–1	Yasam Kurdistan	Tehran
14:30 IRST (UTC+03:30)	Safarastgoo 48'; Sadeghi 55' (pen.); Mohammadi 67'; Ardestani 89'	report	Rezaei 40'	Stadium: Shahid Kazemi Stadium; Referee: Fatemeh Nasiri

12 December 2025 10	Persepolis	0–1	Eesta Alborz	Tehran
14:00 IRST (UTC+03:30)		report	Shaban 85'	Stadium: Shahid Kazemi Stadium; Referee: Solaleh Javadi

19 December 2025 11	Fara Isatis Karan	1–2	Persepolis	Shiraz
15:00 IRST (UTC+03:30)	Khalilifar 75'	report	Ghasemi 6'; Rezaei 46'	Stadium: Shahid Dastgheib Stadium; Referee: Elaheh Sinakaei

26 December 2025 12	Persepolis	1–2	Gol Gohar	Tehran
14:00 IRST (UTC+03:30)	Ghanbari 25' (pen.)	report	Chatrenoor 16'; Behesht 70'	Stadium: Shahid Kazemi Stadium; Referee: Maedeh Jafari

2 January 2026 13	Palayesh Gaz Ilam	1–1	Persepolis	Ilam
14:00 IRST (UTC+03:30)	Esmaeili 80'	report	Safarastgoo 82'	Stadium: Takhti Stadium; Referee: Sahar Bibak

9 January 2026 14	Persepolis	0–0	Sepahan	Tehran
13:00 IRST (UTC+03:30)		report		Stadium: Shahid Kazemi Stadium; Referee: Zahra Raeisi

23 January 2026 15	Persepolis	1–0	Malavan	Tehran
13:00 IRST (UTC+03:30)	Ghasemi 55'	report		Stadium: Shahid Kazemi Stadium; Referee: Solaleh Javadi

30 January 2026 16	Khatoon	2–1	Persepolis	Bam
13:00 IRST (UTC+03:30)	Motevalli 56'; Didar 66'	report	Ghanbari 18'	Stadium: Fajr Stadium; Referee: Fatemeh Eskandarzadeh

5 February 2026 17	Persepolis	1–0	Ava Tehran	Tehran
13:00 IRST (UTC+03:30)	Ghanbari 30'	report		Stadium: Shahid Kazemi Stadium; Referee: Elaheh Sinakaei

10 February 2026 18	Yasam Kurdistan	0–4	Persepolis	Sanandaj
13:00 IRST (UTC+03:30)		report	Ghanbari 60' (pen.), 68', 87'; Ghasemi 78'	Stadium: Esteghlal Stadium; Referee: Maedeh Jafari

==== Score overview ====
Win Draw Loss

Opposition	Home score	Away score	Aggregate score
Ava Tehran	1–0	1–0	2–0
Eesta Alborz	0–1	0–0	0–1
Fara Isatis Karan	2–0	2–1	4–1
Gol Gohar	1–2	0–3	1–5
Bam Khatoon	0–1	1–2	1–3
Malavan	1–0	0–2	1–2
Palayesh Gaz Ilam	1–1	1–1	2–2
Sepahan	0–0	0–2	0–2
Yasam Kurdistan	4–1	4–0	8–1

== Statistics ==
=== Overall ===
No.	Pos.	Nat.	Name	Kowsar League	
No.	Pos.	Nat.	Name	Apps	Goals
Goalkeepers
1	GK	(Iran)	Samira Mohammadi	5	0
12	GK	(Iran)	Negin Iranpour	0	0
22	GK	(Iran)	Atena Tofigh	5	0
54	GK	(Iran)	Zahra Khajavi	8	0
Defenders
4	DF	(Iran)	Zeinab Abbaspour	17	2
5	DF	(Iran)	Hedieh Hezarjaribi	2 (3)	0
8	DF	(Iran)	Ghazaleh Salehipour	(2)	0
11	DF	(Iran)	Zahra Ahmadizadeh	17 (1)	0
23	DF	(Iran)	Fatemeh Rezaei	18	0
24	DF	(Iran)	Elham Abdolrahmani	13 (1)	0
80	DF	(Iran)	Mahsa Alimadadi	(1)	0
Midfielders
7	MF	(Iran)	Sahar Ramezani	10 (1)	0
9	MF	(Iran)	Maryam Mohammadi	2 (9)	1
14	MF	(Iran)	Maryam Safarastgoo	10	0
17	MF	(Iran)	Soheila Shirali	3 (7)	0
18	MF	(Iran)	Sana Sadeghi	16 (2)	1
77	MF	(Iran)	Fatemeh Ardestani	1 (3)	1
88	MF	(Iran)	Melika Bagherinasab	2 (3)	0
Forwards
10	FW	(Iran)	Fatemeh Ghasemi	12 (4)	3
19	FW	(Iran)	Fatemeh Rezaei	17	1
20	FW	(Iran)	Somayeh Khorrami	6 (6)	1
21	FW	(Iran)	Fatemeh Safarastgoo	8 (5)	2
25	FW	(Iran)	Samaneh Ghamari	15 (2)	1
27	FW	(Iran)	Nastaran Mohammadkhani	2 (5)	0
99	FW	(Iran)	Zahra Ghanbari	9	6
Players who have played but left during the season
5	DF	(Iran)	Narjes Tayebi	0	0
13	DF	(Iran)	Mohaddeseh Amiri	(1)	0
90	FW	(Iran)	Zeinab Khalili	0	0
Updated: 21 February 2026

=== Goal scorers ===
Player left the club during the season.

Rank	Number	Nation	Position	Name	Kowsar League
1	99	(Iran)	FW	Zahra Ghanbari	6
2	10	(Iran)	FW	Fatemeh Ghasemi	3
3	4	(Iran)	DF	Zeinab Abbaspour	2
3	21	(Iran)	FW	Fatemeh Safarastgoo	2
4	20	(Iran)	FW	Somayeh Khorrami	1
4	25	(Iran)	FW	Samaneh Ghamari	1
4	18	(Iran)	MF	Sana Sadeghi	1
4	9	(Iran)	MF	Maryam Mohammadi	1
4	77	(Iran)	MF	Fatemeh Ardestani	1
4	19	(Iran)	FW	Fatemeh Rezaei	1
Total					19
Last updated: 10 February 2026

=== Assists ===
Rank	Number	Nation	Position	Name	Kowsar League
1	19	(Iran)	FW	Fatemeh Rezaei	2
2	21	(Iran)	FW	Fatemeh Safarastgoo	1
2	25	(Iran)	FW	Samaneh Ghamari	1
2	7	(Iran)	MF	Sahar Ramezani	1
2	18	(Iran)	FW	Sana Sadeghi	1
2	88	(Iran)	MF	Melika Bagherinasab	1
2	9	(Iran)	MF	Maryam Mohammadi	1
Total					8
Last updated: 22 January 2026

=== Clean sheets ===
Rank	Number	Nation	Name	Kowsar League
1	54	(Iran)	Zahra Khajavi	4
2	1	(Iran)	Samira Mohammadi	2
3	22	(Iran)	Atena Tofigh	1
4	12	(Iran)	Negin Iranpour	0
Total				7
Last updated: 10 February 2026
