= 2026–27 Kowsar Women's League =

Kowsar Women's League
- Season: 2026–27
- Dates: 18 September 2026 – Winter 2027
- All statistics correct as of 27 August 2026.

The 2026–27 Kowsar Women's League is the 19th season of the Kowsar Women's League, the top tier of women's club football in Iran.

== Teams ==
Ten teams compete in this season's competition.

=== Promotion and relegation (pre-season) ===
Promoted from 2025–26 Iran 1st Division League	Relegated to 2026–27 Iran 1st Division League
Varesh Nowshahr Esteghlal	Fara Isatis Karan Yasam Kurdistan

=== Stadiums and locations ===
Locations of clubs on the map Tehran (3), Kerman (2), Alborz (1), Isfahan (1), Ilam (1), Mazandaran (1), Gilan (1)

Team	Location	Stadium	Capacity
Ava	Tehran	Kargaran Stadium	5,000
Esteghlal	Tehran	Marghoobkar Stadium	12,000
Eesta	Karaj	Enghelab Stadium	15,000
Palayesh Gaz	Ilam	Takhti Stadium	15,000
Persepolis	Tehran	Shahid Kazemi Stadium	15,000
Khatoon	Bam	Fajr Stadium	15,000
Sepahan	Isfahan	Qods Stadium	3,000
Gol Gohar	Sirjan	Imam Ali Stadium	8,000
Malavan	Bandar Anzali	Sirous Ghayeghran Stadium	9,000
Varesh	Nowshahr	Shohada-ye Nowshahr Stadium	5,000

== League table ==
Pos	Team	Pld	W	D	L	GF	GA	GD	Pts	Qualification or relegation
1	Persepolis	8	6	0	2	14	7	+7	18	Qualification for the 2027–28 AFC Women's Champions League stage
2	Gol Gohar	8	4	4	0	17	5	+12	16	
3	Esteghlal	8	5	1	2	14	10	+4	16	
4	Khatoon	6	4	2	0	20	3	+17	14	
5	Sepahan	7	4	1	2	10	3	+7	13	
6	Varesh	7	3	0	4	6	13	−7	9	
7	Eesta	8	1	4	3	2	5	−3	7	
8	Malavan	8	2	0	6	7	20	−13	6	
9	Ava	8	1	2	5	5	18	−13	5	Relegation to 2027–28 Iran Women's Football 1st Division
10	Palayesh Gaz	8	0	2	6	2	13	−11	2	Relegation to 2027–28 Iran Women's Football 1st Division

Updated to match(es) played on 16 November 2026. Source: League Full Table
Rules for classification: 1) Points; 2) Head-to-head points; 3) Head-to-head goal difference; 4) Total goal difference; 5) Total goals scored; 6) Fair-play points.
(Note: Head-to-head record is used only after all the matches between the teams in question have been played).

== Results ==
Home \ Away	AVA	EES	EST	GOL	KHA	MLV	PGI	PRS	SEP	VAR
Ava	—	0–0	1–2		1–7					2–0
Eesta		—		0–0	0–0	1–0	0–0			
Esteghlal		1–0	—			2–0	2–0		2–1	
Gol Gohar	5–0		3–3	—				2–1		4–1
Khatoon			3–1	0–0	—	6–0				
Malavan	2–1					—	4–2	0–4		
Palayesh Gaz	0–0			0–3			—	0–2		0–1
Persepolis	2–0		2–1		1–4			—	1–0	1–0
Sepahan		2–0		0–0		2–0	1–0		—	
Varesh		2–1				2–1			0–4	—

Updated to match(es) played on 16 November 2026. Source: Kowsar League
Legend: Blue = home team win; Yellow = draw; Red = away team win.
For upcoming matches, an "a" indicates there is an article about the rivalry between the two participants.

== Positions by round ==
Team ╲ Round	1	2	3	4	5	6	7	8	9	10	11	12	13	14	15	16	17	18
Ava	9	7	7	9	7	8	9											
Esteghlal	4	5	6	5	5	5	3											
Eesta	6	6	5	6	6	6	6											
Palayesh Gaz	8	8	8	10	10	10	10											
Persepolis	3	2	1	1	1	1	1											
Khatoon	5	4	3	3	2	3	4											
Sepahan	2	3	2	2	3	4	5											
Gol Gohar	1	1	4	4	4	2	2											
Malavan	7	9	9	7	9	9	8											
Varesh	10	10	10	8	8	7	7											

Source: Iran Football League Organization

== See also ==
- Kowsar Women Football League
- Iran Women's Football 1st Division League
- Iran Women's Hazfi Cup
- AFC Women's Champions League
