= Eesta Alborz W.F.C. =

Eesta Alborz
- Founded: 2019
- Ground: Enghelab Stadium
- Capacity: 15,000
- Manager: Niloofar Ardalan
- League: Kowsar Women Football League
- 2025–26: 3rd

Eesta Alborz Women's Football Club (Persian: باشگاه فوتبال زنان ایستا البرز), formerly known as Eesta Kurdistan, is an Iranian women's football club competing in the Kowsar Women Football League. In the 2025–26 season, the club relocated from Kurdistan to Alborz and is now considered one of the title contenders in the Iranian women's top flight.

With financial backing from Eesta Heavy Machinery Company and a strategy of signing top national team players, Eesta Alborz has established itself as an emerging power in Iranian women's football. The club is currently managed by Niloofar Ardalan, one of the most successful coaches in Iranian women's football.

== History ==
=== Kurdistan era (until 2025) ===
The Kurdistan women's football team has a long history in Iranian women's football, having played under various names including Vchan Kurdistan, Zareh Battery Kurdistan, and Kani Kurdistan in the top division. In the 2019–20 season, the club finished as runners-up in the league with 48 points, behind champions Shahrdari Bam with 54 points.

Additionally, Somayeh Khorrami, a player for Vchan Kurdistan, was named the league's top scorer that season. The 2020–21 season ended with the club finishing fourth.

In the 2024–25 season, the club competed as Eesta Kurdistan and finished fourth in the league table, marking one of its successful campaigns.

=== Relocation to Alborz (2025) ===
In the summer of 2025, Eesta Kurdistan announced in a statement that due to financial challenges and insufficient support from Kurdistan provincial officials, it would withdraw from running the team in the province and put its top-flight license up for sale.

Eventually, the license was transferred to Alborz province and the club entered the new league season as Eesta Alborz, opening a new chapter in the history of women's football in both Alborz and Kurdistan.

=== 2025–26 season ===
Star signings

During the 2025–26 transfer window, Eesta Alborz made headlines by signing two of the biggest stars in Iranian women's football:

Zahra Khajavi: The number one goalkeeper of the Iran national team, who previously played for Khatoon Bam.
Zahra Ghanbari: Forward and captain of the national team, known as the all-time top scorer of the Kowsar League, who also played for Khatoon Bam.

These two players, alongside other national team players such as Forough Mouri and Mohaddeseh Zolfi, formed a strong squad for Eesta Alborz.

==== Results and performance ====
Eesta Alborz started the 2025–26 season strongly. In the first week, the team faced Persepolis at Enghelab Stadium and earned their first point with a goalless draw.

The team went on to secure valuable victories and finished the first half of the season with 17 points (5 wins, 2 draws, 2 losses), sitting third in the table. Notable results included a 5–0 win against Yasam Kurdistan in week five.

== Technical staff ==
The technical staff of Eesta Alborz for the 2025–26 season:

· Head coach: Niloofar Ardalan – one of the most recognized figures in Iranian women's football and former head coach of the Iran U-20 national team

Niloofar Ardalan, a former player of the Iran national football and futsal teams, was appointed as Eesta Alborz's head coach, bringing a distinguished coaching career with five futsal league titles.

== Notable players ==
=== Current players (2025–26 season) ===
Zahra Khajavi – Goalkeeper (national team player)
Zahra Ghanbari – Forward and captain (national team player)
Forough Mouri – Forward (national team player)
Mohaddeseh Zolfi – Forward
Samira Mohammadi – (national team player)
Fatemeh Motavalli – Player

In October 2025, seven players from Eesta Alborz were called up to the Iran women's national team camp, reflecting the high quality of the club's squad.

=== Former players from the Kurdistan era ===
During the club's time in Kurdistan, notable players included:

Fatemeh Makhdumi
Zohreh Jalali
Samira Mahmoudpour
Somayeh Esmaeili
Fatemeh Shaban

== Home stadium ==
For the 2025–26 season, Eesta Alborz uses Enghelab Stadium in Karaj as its home ground. With a capacity of 15,000, it is one of the standard stadiums in Alborz province, opened in 2005.

Enghelab Stadium features natural grass and suitable facilities for hosting national and international matches and is currently undergoing renovation.

== Kit and colours ==
Eesta Alborz's primary kit colour is blue. At the club's second kit unveiling ceremony in October 2025, players introduced the new kit wearing blue at the historic Khosro Abad Mansion in Sanandaj.

== Honours ==
=== Club ===
· Kowsar Women Football League runners-up: 1 (2019–20, as Vchan Kurdistan) · Fourth place in the Kowsar League: 2 (2020–21 and 2024–25, as Kani Kurdistan and Eesta Kurdistan)

=== Individual ===
· Kowsar League top scorer: Somayeh Khorrami (2019–20)

== Sponsorship ==
Eesta Alborz is financially supported by Eesta Heavy Machinery Company, a company active in the production and distribution of heavy machinery in Iran, which established the Eesta Cultural and Sports Institute to support women's sports.

The main goal of this support is to strengthen and develop women's sports, promote a culture of professional sports among women, and create platforms for the flourishing of sports talents.

== Rivalries and derbies ==
=== Alborz derby ===
In the 2022–23 season, Taran Alborz was the representative of Alborz province in the top division. In their week-four match, Taran Alborz defeated Eesta Kurdistan (then playing as Kurdistan) 2–1. In the return match during the 2025–26 season, Eesta Alborz got their revenge with a 2–1 win over Taran Alborz.

== Current season standings ==
As of the end of week nine of the 2025–26 season, Eesta Alborz sits third in the league table with 16 points. Khatoon Bam leads with 24 points, and Gol Gohar Sirjan is second with 21 points.
