= Sepideh Nozhati =

Iranian footballer (born 1987)

Personal information
- Full name: Sepideh Nozhati Tasavori
- Date of birth: 20 September 1987 (age 39)
- Place of birth: Rasht, Iran
- Height: 1.77 m (5 ft 10 in)
- Position: Forward

Team information
- Current team: Malavan W.F.C.
- Number: 2

Senior career*
Years	Team	Apps	(Gls)
–2023	Malavan W.F.C.	150	(50)

International career^{‡}
2014	Iran U16		(1)
2018–	Iran	8	(5)
- * Club domestic league appearances and goals ‡ National team caps and goals as of 9 April 2019

Sepideh Nozhati (born 20 September 1987), known as Sepideh Nozhati Tasavori (Persian: سپیده نزهتی), is an Iranian footballer who plays as a forward for the Kowsar Women Football League club Malavan W.F.C. and the Iran women's national team.
