= 2020–21 Kowsar Women's League =

Kowsar Women Football League
- Season: 2020–21
- Champions: Shahrdari Sirjan (2 titles)
- AFC Club Championship: Shahrdari Sirjan
- Highest scoring: Afsaneh Chatrenoor (22 Goals)

The 2020–21 Iranian Women Football League was the 13th season of the Iran Women League. Shahrdari Bam were the defending champions. The season featured 11 teams divided into two groups of 5 and 6 teams for regular season. Shahrdari Sirjan won the league for the second time and ended three consecutive winnings of Shahrdari Bam.

== Format ==
Due to COVID-19 pandemic in Iran the format of the league changed from normal round-robin in previous seasons to new format: 11 teams divided into two groups of 5 and 6 teams. In each group, teams played against each other in two home and away matches. After the end of these matches in both groups, winners and runners-up of each group (total 4 teams) qualified to final stage and the lowest ranked team in each group (total 2 teams) relegated to Women 1st Division. In final stage, four teams played against each other in a round-robin home-and-away format in 6 weeks.

== Regular season ==
=== Group 1 ===
Pos	Team	Pld	W	D	L	GF	GA	GD	Pts	Qualification or relegation
1	Shahrdari Bam	8	6	1	1	23	5	+18	19	Promoted Final Round
2	Sepahan Isfahan	8	6	1	1	20	8	+12	19	Promoted Final Round
3	Zobahan Isfahan	7	3	2	2	15	7	+8	11	
4	Heyat Football Alborz	8	2	0	6	21	7	+14	6	
5	Hamyari Azarbaijan Gharbi	8	0	0	8	3	29	−26	0	Relegation to 2021-22 Women 1st Division

Updated to match(es) played on March 7, 2021. Source: Footba11
Rules for classification: 1) Points; 2) Goal difference; 3) Goals scored.

=== Group 2 ===
Pos	Team	Pld	W	D	L	GF	GA	GD	Pts	Qualification or relegation
1	Shahrdari Sirjan	10	9	1	0	48	8	+40	28	Promoted Final Round
2	Vechan Kurdestan	10	7	1	2	41	9	+32	22	Promoted Final Round
3	Palayesh Gas Ilam	10	5	3	2	17	10	+7	18	
4	Malavan Bandar Anzali	10	3	1	6	17	17	0	10	
5	Sargol Bushehr	10	3	0	7	11	19	−8	9	
6	Qashqai Shiraz	10	0	0	10	0	71	−71	0	Relegation to 2021-22 Women 1st Division

Updated to match(es) played on March 7, 2021. Source: Footba11
Rules for classification: 1) Points; 2) Goal difference; 3) Goals scored.

== Final Round ==
Pos	Team	Pld	W	D	L	GF	GA	GD	Pts	Qualification or relegation
1	Shahrdari Sirjan	6	4	1	1	15	6	+9	13	Qualify for 2021 AFC Women's Club Championship
2	Shahrdari Bam	6	3	2	1	9	3	+6	11	
3	Sepahan Isfahan	6	2	1	3	14	8	+6	7	
4	Vechan Kurdestan	6	0	2	4	4	13	−9	2	

Updated to match(es) played on May 17, 2021. Source: Footba11
Rules for classification: 1) Points; 2) Goal difference; 3) Goals scored.
