= Marzieh Nikkhah =

Iranian footballer (born 1992)

Personal information
- Date of birth: 25 November 1992 (age 33)
- Place of birth: Hamadan, Iran
- Position: Midfielder

Team information
- Current team: Persepolis
- Number: 10

International career
Years	Team	Apps	(Gls)
- Iran

Marzieh Nikkhah (Persian: مرضیه نیکخواه; born 25 November 1992 in Hamadan) is an Iranian footballer who plays as a midfielder for Sepahan in the Kowsar Women Football League and the Iran national team.
