= Sana Sadeghi =

Iranian footballer (born 2000)

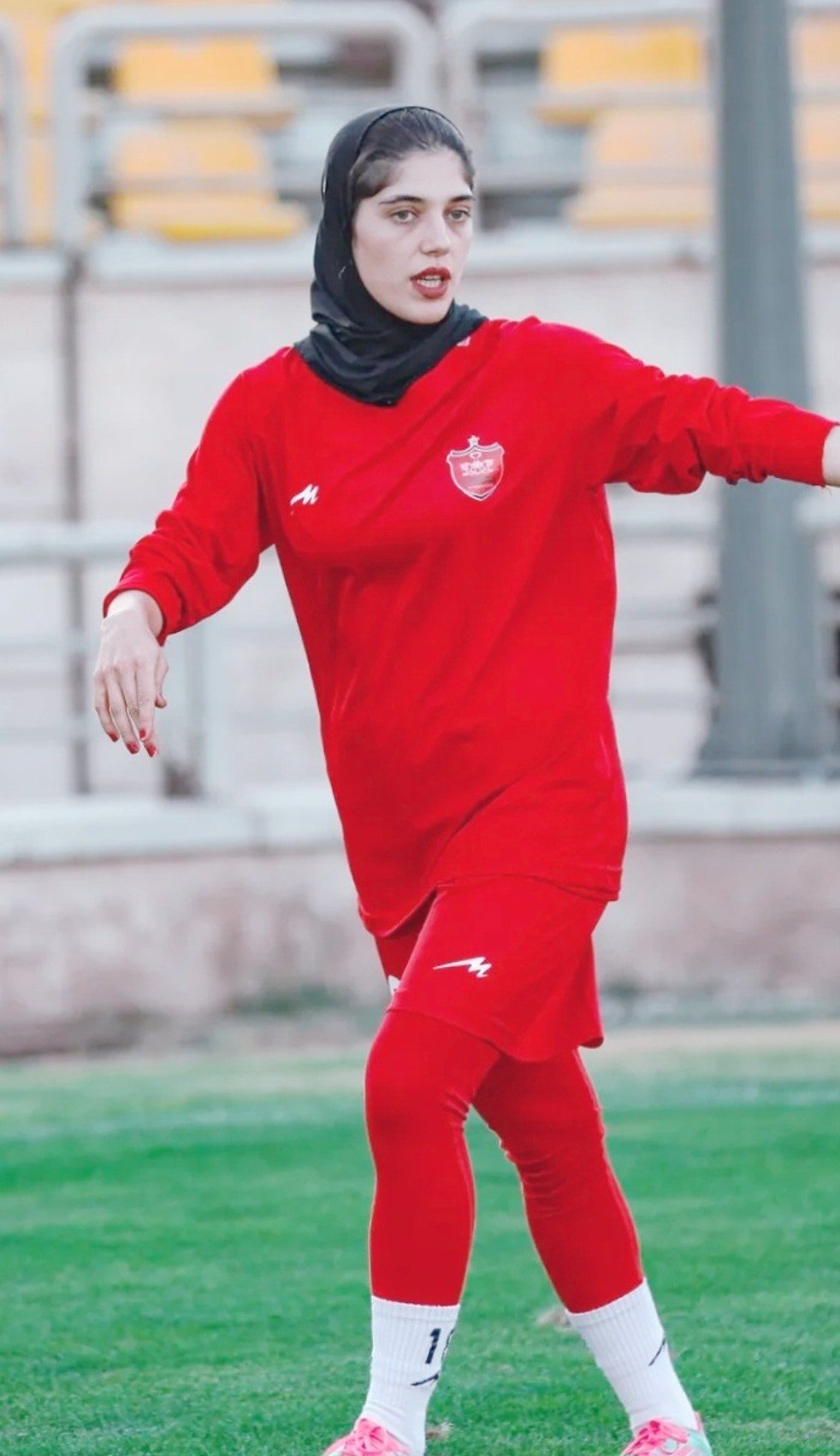
- Sadeghi in Persepolis training in 2025

Personal information
- Full name: Sana Sadeghi
- Date of birth: 12 July 2000 (age 26)
- Place of birth: Ravansar, Kermanshah, Iran
- Position: Midfielder

Team information
- Current team: Persepolis F.C. (women)
- Number: 18

International career^{‡}
Years	Team	Apps	(Gls)
	Iran	18	(0)
- ‡ National team caps and goals as of 15 August 2023

Sana Sadeghi (Persian: ثنا صادقی; born 12 June 2000) is an Iranian footballer who plays as a midfielder for Kowsar Women Football League club Persepolis and the Iran women's national team.

== International career ==
Sadeghi plays for the Iran's senior women's national team and has participated in the following international official tournaments:

- AFC Women's Olympic Qualifying
- CAFA Women's Championship
- AFC Women's Asian Cup
