= Atena Tofigh =

Iranian footballer (born 2006)

Personal information
- Full name: Atena Tofigh
- Date of birth: 26 February 2006 (age 20)
- Place of birth: Hamedan, Iran
- Position: Goalkeeper

Team information
- Current team: Persepolis
- Number: 22

Senior career*
Years	Team	Apps	(Gls)
2021–2022	Shahinpars		
2022–2023	Sanaye Ghazaei Sahar		
2023–2024	Akoo Kermanshah		
2024–2025	Ava Tehran		
2025–	Persepolis		

International career
- Iran U18
- Iran U20
- * Club domestic league appearances and goals

Atena Tofigh (Persian: آتنا توفیق; born 26 February 2006) is an Iranian professional footballer who plays as a Goalkeeper for Kowsar Women Football League club Persepolis.
