= Samira Mohammadi =

Iranian Football player

Samira Mohammadi Jarihani
- Mohammadi in an interview with Tasnim News Agency

Personal information
- Date of birth: 14 June 1992 (age 34)
- Place of birth: Urmia, Iran

Team information
- Current team: Malavan
- Number: 33

Senior career*
Years	Team	Apps	(Gls)
2011–2012	Shahrdari Urmia		
2012–2014	Ayandeh Sazan Mihan Najafabad		
- Hamyari Urmia
- Sepahan
- Saba Mehr Tabriz
2021–2022	Ataşehir Belediyespor	0	(0)
2022–	Malavan	0	(0)
- * Club domestic league appearances and goals

Samira Mohammadi Jarihani (Persian: سمیرا محمدی جاریحانی; born 14 June 1992), commonly known as Samira Mohammadi, is an Iranian professional footballer who plays as a goalkeeper for Malavan in the Kowsar Women Football League.

She has also represented the Iran national team.

== Club career ==
Mohammadi began her career with Shahrdari Urmia in 2011. She then played for Ayandeh Sazan Mihan Najafabad, Hemiari Urmia, Sepahan, and Saba Mehr Tabriz.

In 2021, she joined Turkish club Ataşehir Belediyespor. In 2022, she returned to Iran and signed with Malavan.

== Honours ==
Ayandeh Sazan Mihan Najafabad
Iranian Kowsar Women League: Runners-up

Sepahan
Iranian Kowsar Women League: Third place

Malavan
Iranian Kowsar Women League: Runners-up
