= Fatemeh Safarastgoo =

Iranian footballer (born 2003)

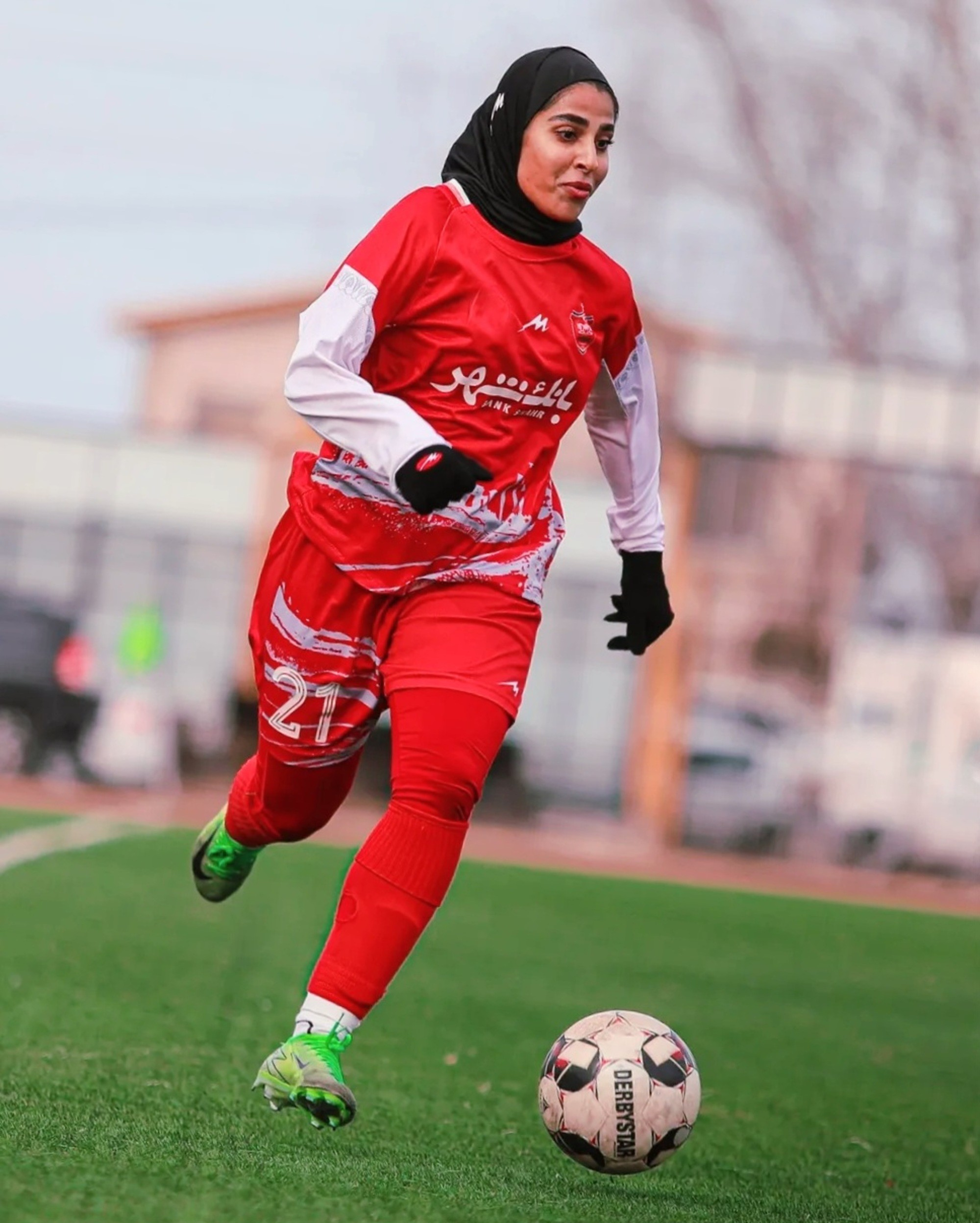
- Safarastgoo playing for Persepolis W.F.C. in 2025

Personal information
- Full name: Fatemeh Safarastgoo
- Date of birth: 27 March 2003 (age 23)
- Place of birth: Shiraz, Iran
- Height: 1.71 m (5 ft 7 in)
- Position: Forward

Team information
- Current team: Persepolis W.F.C.
- Number: 21

Senior career*
Years	Team	Apps	(Gls)
2024–	Persepolis W.F.C.		

International career
2018–	Iran	1	(0)
- * Club domestic league appearances and goals

Fatemeh Safarastgoo (Persian: فاطمه صفاراستگو; born 27 March 2003) is an Iranian professional footballer who plays as a forward for the Kowsar Women Football League club Persepolis and the Iran women's national team.

Before joining Persepolis, Safarastgoo has played for Iran women's national football team and several Iranian clubs in all younger leagues. She has also experience in the Kowsar League, Top tier of Iranian Women's Football.

She is one of the first goal scorers in the history of Persepolis (Women) and in the first victory in the history of this club, she scored against the Kamyaran FC.

== Early life ==
Fatemeh Safarastgoo is an Iranian Persian and was born in 2003 in Shiraz, Iran, before her sister, Maryam. In an interview with IRNA, she said about her early football career: “I started playing football in the streets of Shiraz when I was 10 years old, and I would kick anything I could find, from rocks to other objects.” She also said that she first participated in Iranian national football competitions when she was in elementary school. Her membership in the national under-16 and youth teams also helped her progress further in the Iranian Women's Premier League. Her positions during this period were right and left defense.

== Club career ==
=== Persepolis ===
In the 2024–25 season, the Persepolis women's football team was launched for the first time since the revolution. Shortly after, Safarastgoo signed a contract with the team and joined Persepolis. In her second official match for the team, she scored a goal against Kamyaran, becoming one of the first female goal scorers in the history of Persepolis.

Safarastgoo, who also scored in the league final, scored 9 goals in her first season playing for Persepolis, becoming the top scorer of the competition. She played a key and important role in the team's championship with her goals and also won the competition's top scorer.

== International career ==
She has achieved success with Iran women's national under-17 football team and has played for the Iran U-20 and Iran team.
