= Sardar Jangal Stadium =

Sardar Jangal سردار جنگل
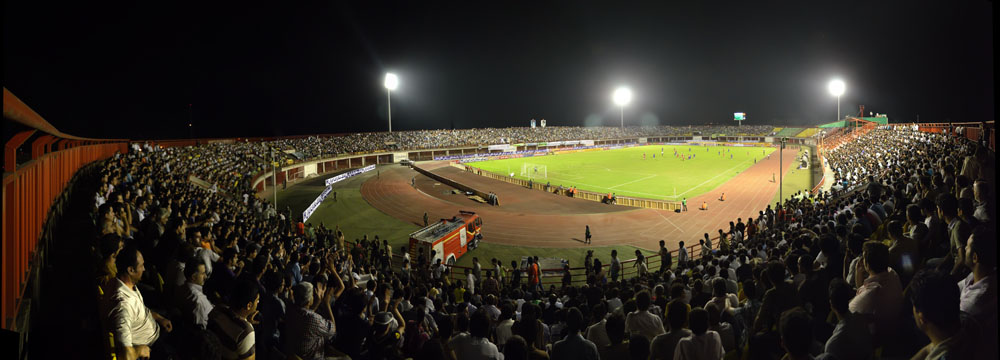
- Interactive map of Sardar Jangal سردار جنگل
- Full name: Sardar Jangal Stadium
- Location: Rasht, Iran
- Owner: Sepidrood Rasht S.C.
- Capacity: 25,000
- Surface: Artificial turf

Construction
- Built: 2006–2007
- Opened: 7 September 2007

Tenants
- Sepidrood Rasht S.C., Malavan W.F.C.

The Sardar Jangal Stadium (Persian: ورزشگاه سردار جنگل) is a sports stadium located in Rasht, Iran. It is used by Sepidrood Rasht S.C. in some Iran's Premier Football League matches as of the start of the 2017–18 season.
