= Fatemeh Ghasemi =

Iranian footballer (born 2001)

Personal information
- Full name: Fatemeh Ghasemi
- Date of birth: 14 February 2001 (age 25)
- Place of birth: Firuzabad, Iran
- Position: Forward

Team information
- Current team: Persepolis
- Number: 10

Senior career*
Years	Team	Apps	(Gls)
- Vachan Kurdistan
2021–25	Ataşehir Belediyespor	17	(5)
2025–	Persepolis	16	(5)

International career^{‡}
2012	Iran U13		(2)
2013–2015	Iran U14		(26)
2014–2016	Iran U16		(17)
2016–2018	Iran U19	4	(3)
2017	Iran	3	(2)
- * Club domestic league appearances and goals as of 5 February 2023 ‡ National team caps and goals as of 28 October 2018

Fatemeh Ghasemi (Persian: فاطمه قاسمی; born 14 February 2001) is an Iranian professional footballer who plays as a forward. She has been a member of the Iran women's national team.

== Club career ==
Ghasemi moved to Turkey and joined the Istanbul-based club Ataşehir Belediyespor to play in the Women's Super League.

== International goals ==
No.	Date	Venue	Opponent	Score	Result	Competition
1.	11 April 2017	Vietnam YTF Center, Hanoi, Vietnam	Syria	8–0	12–0	2018 AFC Women's Asian Cup qualification
2.	29 November 2018	Milliy Stadium, Tashkent, Uzbekistan	Tajikistan	1–1	4–1	2018 CAFA Women's Championship
3.	29 November 2018	Milliy Stadium, Tashkent, Uzbekistan	Tajikistan	3–1	4–1	2018 CAFA Women's Championship
