= Asan Pardakht =

- Native name: آسان پرداخت
- Company type: Private company
- Industry: Financial services
- Founded: 2009; 16 years ago
- Headquarters: Tehran, Iran
- Area served: Iran

Asan Pardakht (Persian: آسان پرداخت) AKA AP (pronounced as UP) is an Iranian debit card and PSP company. The Asan Pardakht Persian branded by (AP) inaugurated its activity in 2009 in the field of electronic payment card systems and then developed its activity in selling mobile recharge, air time and bill payment services. The AP is one of the initial 12 electronic payment service providers (PSP) in IRAN and the owner of the main part of the market share. AP is the greatest and most developed provider as Air time, Top up and recharge for cellular phone. It has a payment app and credit cards. The company's main software product is the POS machine app, it processes payments from Iranian banks. AP app supports online shopping, the app which was removed from Google Play in 2023.

== History ==
Asan Pardakht started off as a payment portal for purchasing mobile operator top ups, paying utility bills and donating to charity. The core technology AP was using was the old school USSD (Unstructured Supplementary Service Data) using the local GSM network. Later on AP managed to get a PSP license which became one of the 12 companies in Iran that is allowed to operate as a PSP and an online payment portal.

== Services ==
=== Mobile payment app ===
- bill payments
- bank account managements
- prepay mobile phone top-up, bus and train ticket purchases
- insurance selections
- barcode reader to scan bill barcode

== See also ==
- Economy of Iran
