= Karegaran Stadium =

Coordinates: 35°40′40.71″N 51°16′53.14″E

- Interactive map of Karegaran Stadium
- Full name: Karegaran Stadium
- Location: Tehran, Fath Expressway
- Owner: Tehran Workers' Sports Board
- Capacity: 5,000

Tenant
- Baadraan (2015–until dissolution)

Karegaran Stadium (Persian: ورزشگاه کارگران) is a sports venue in Tehran, Iran. The stadium hosts the Iranian Karate Super League.

The venue features a grass football pitch that served as the training ground for Persepolis Tehran for many years.

The stadium was used by Baadraan as their home venue until the club's dissolution. Nassaji Mazandaran also trains at this stadium.

In the 2024–25 season, Ava Tehran used the stadium as their home venue.
