= Ava Tehran W.F.C. =

Ava
- Full name: Ava Tehran Women's Football Club
- Ground: Karegaran Stadium
- Capacity: 5,000
- Owner: Ali Mohammadkhani
- Manager: Sara Pashaki
- Coach: Shiva Kolivand
- League: Kowsar Women Football League
- 2025–26: 8th
Home colours	Away colours	Third colours

Ava Tehran W.F.C. (Persian: باشگاه فوتبال زنان آوا تهران) is an Iranian women's football club based in Tehran. The club has a history of competing in the Kowsar Women Football League, the top tier of Iranian women's football.

Ava earned promotion to the top division in the 2022–23 season. However, in the following season, they were relegated to a lower division. Despite this setback, after several developments (including the withdrawal of Paykan and Setaregan Salimi from the league), Ava remained in the top division for the 2024–25 season.

In the 17th season of the Kowsar Women Football League, Ava was the sole representative from Tehran. With an average player age of 16, they were the youngest team in the league during the 2024–25 season.

== Seasons and results ==
=== 2024–25 season ===
Ava's players competed under the guidance of head coach Shiva Kolivand during this season.

==== Players ====
Note: Flags indicate national team as defined under FIFA eligibility rules; some limited exceptions apply. Players may hold more than one non-FIFA nationality.

No.	Pos.	Nation	Player
—	GK	IRN	Mahdieh Mohammadi
1	GK	IRN	Atena Tofigh
—	GK	IRN	Zahra Fathollahi
3	DF	IRN	Sepideh Hosseinkhani (Captain)
2	DF	IRN	Mahya Shakeri
21	DF	IRN	Hanieh Mohammadi
8	DF	IRN	Fatemeh Sarvarzadeh (Captain)
—	DF	IRN	Kimia Abdi
—	DF	IRN	Maryam Sayyadi
6	MF	IRN	Hedieh Hezarjaribi
7	MF	IRN	Ghazal Esmaeili

No.	Pos.	Nation	Player
9	MF	IRN	Mona Khalili
—	MF	IRN	Mina Naderi
16	MF	IRN	Saba Shakeri
—	MF	IRN	Aisan Nezamikhah
27	MF	IRN	Reyhaneh Hammamian
19	MF	IRN	Sepideh Vali
14	FW	IRN	Saya Mohammadzadeh
17	FW	IRN	Fatemeh Lotfzadeh
—	FW	IRN	Shadan Shahmiri
20	FW	IRN	Samaneh Ghamari
10	FW	IRN	Fatemeh Rezaei
15	FW	IRN	Zahra Khajezadeh

==== Results ====
Win Draw Loss Fixtures

18 October 2024 Week 1	Khatoon Bam	v	Ava Tehran
15:00 IRST (UTC+03:30)		Report

25 October 2024 Week 2	Ava Tehran	1–7	Eesta Kordistan	Tehran
15:00 IRST (UTC+03:30)	Fatemeh Rezaei	Report	Mouri Makhdumi Shaban	Stadium: Kargaran Stadium; Referee: Salaleh Javadi

1 November 2024 Week 3	Setaregan Salimi Tangestan	1–2	Ava Tehran	Bushehr
16:30 IRST (UTC+03:30)	Maryam Abazari	Report	Samaneh Ghamari Fatemeh Rezaei	Stadium: Beheshti Stadium; Referee: Maedeh Jafari

8 November 2024 Week 4	Ava Tehran	0–2	Sepahan Isfahan	Tehran
14:45 IRST (UTC+03:30)		Report	Forouzandeh 37' Farahmand 82'	Stadium: Kargaran Stadium; Referee: Zohreh Eskandari

15 November 2024 Week 5	Malavan Bandar Anzali	1–0	Ava Tehran	Rasht
14:30 IRST (UTC+03:30)	Nazanin Zahra Mansour Vares	Report		Stadium: Sardar Jangal Stadium; Referee: Salaleh Javadi

21 November 2024 Week 6	Ava Tehran	0–1	Palayesh Gaz Ilam	Tehran
14:30 IRST (UTC+03:30)			Fatemeh Yousefi	Stadium: Kargaran Stadium; Referee: Sahar Bibak

December 2024 Week 7	Gol Gohar Sirjan	v	Ava Tehran	Sirjan
IRST (UTC+03:30)

==== 2024–25 league table ====
===== Goalscorers in 2024–25 season =====
There have been 3 goals scored in 2 matches, for an average of 1.5 goals per match (as of 29 October 2024).

2 goals

· Fatemeh Rezaei

1 goal

· Samaneh Ghamari
