= Gol Gohar Sirjan W.F.C. =

Gol Gohar Sirjan (Women)
- Full name: Gol Gohar Sirjan Women's Football Club
- Ground: Imam Ali Stadium
- Capacity: 8,000
- Owner: Golgohar Mining and Industrial Company
- Manager: Maryam Jahannejati
- League: Kowsar Women Football League
- 2024–25: Runners-up

Gol Gohar Sirjan Women's Football Club (WFC) (Persian: باشگاه فوتبال زنان گل‌گهر سیرجان) is an Iranian women's football club based in Sirjan, Iran, competing in the Kowsar Women Football League. The club finished as runners-up in the 2024–25 season.

== History ==
Gol Gohar Sirjan Women's Football Club is supported by the Golgohar Mining and Industrial Company. The team previously competed in the women's league under the name Shahrdari Sirjan and has played under the Gol Gohar name for the past two seasons.

With the transfer of Shahrdari Sirjan's license to Gol Gohar in August 2024, the club officially entered the top tier of Iranian women's football.

Shahrdari Sirjan was one of the established clubs in Iranian women's football, with a record of 2 league titles, 3 runners-up finishes, and 4 third-place finishes. Eventually, with the approval of the Sirjan City Council, the club's activities came to an end and Gol Gohar acquired its license.

== Performance in the league ==
=== 2023–24 season ===
Gol Gohar emerged as one of the title contenders in the women's league this season, beginning the campaign under the management of Maryam Jahannejati.

=== 2024–25 season ===
Under the management of Maryam Jahannejati, Gol Gohar Sirjan had an excellent 2024–25 season and competed neck-and-neck with Khatoon Bam for the title from the start of the season.

By the end of the season, the team finished second with 47 points from 18 matches (15 wins, 2 draws, 1 loss), scoring 50 goals and conceding 9, earning the runners-up spot.

On the final matchday, Gol Gohar defeated Fara Isatis Karan Fars 4–2, but the win was not enough to secure the title, marking their most bittersweet victory of the season.

Khatoon Bam won the title with 49 points, while Gol Gohar finished second with 47 points.

== Notable players ==
- Afsaneh Chatrenoor

Afsaneh Chatrenoor, an experienced Gol Gohar player, won the top scorer title of the women's league for the fourth time in her career with 26 goals in the 2024–25 season. She claimed the title with a significant margin over her rivals (Mona Hamoudi with 14 goals and Zahra Ghanbari with 13 goals).

Chatrenoor received the Golden Boot of the previous season from Mehdi Taj, President of the Football Federation, at the official draw ceremony of the 19th edition of the Kowsar Women Football League.

- Shabnam Behesht

Shabnam Behesht is another key Gol Gohar player who had an outstanding season. She scored the winning goal for her team against Ava Tehran.

- Zahra Alizadeh

Zahra Alizadeh, an experienced national team player, joined Gol Gohar Sirjan in August 2025. She had previously played for Shahrdari Sirjan and, after shining there, moved to Sepahan. She was recognized as the best assist provider of the league in the 2024–25 season.

- Other players

Other young players of the team who were regular starters in the 2024–25 season include Parnia Rahmani, Tania Jahanshahi, Maedeh Birang, and Kimia Rahimi.

== Technical staff ==
- Head coach: Maryam Jahannejati (since the 2023–24 season)

Maryam Jahannejati has a women's league title on her resume with Shahrdari Sirjan and even participated with the team in the test tournament of the AFC Women's Club Championship.

== Stadium ==
Gol Gohar Sirjan hosts its matches at Imam Ali Stadium in Sirjan.

== Honours ==
Competition	Winners	Runners-up	Seasons
Kowsar Women Football League	–	1	Winners: –; Runners-up: 2024–25

== Individual honours ==
- Kowsar Women Football League top scorer: Afsaneh Chatrenoor (2024–25 season – 26 goals)
- Kowsar Women Football League best assist provider: Zahra Alizadeh (2024–25 season)
