= Sirous Ghayeghran Stadium =

Football stadium in Iran

- San Sirous
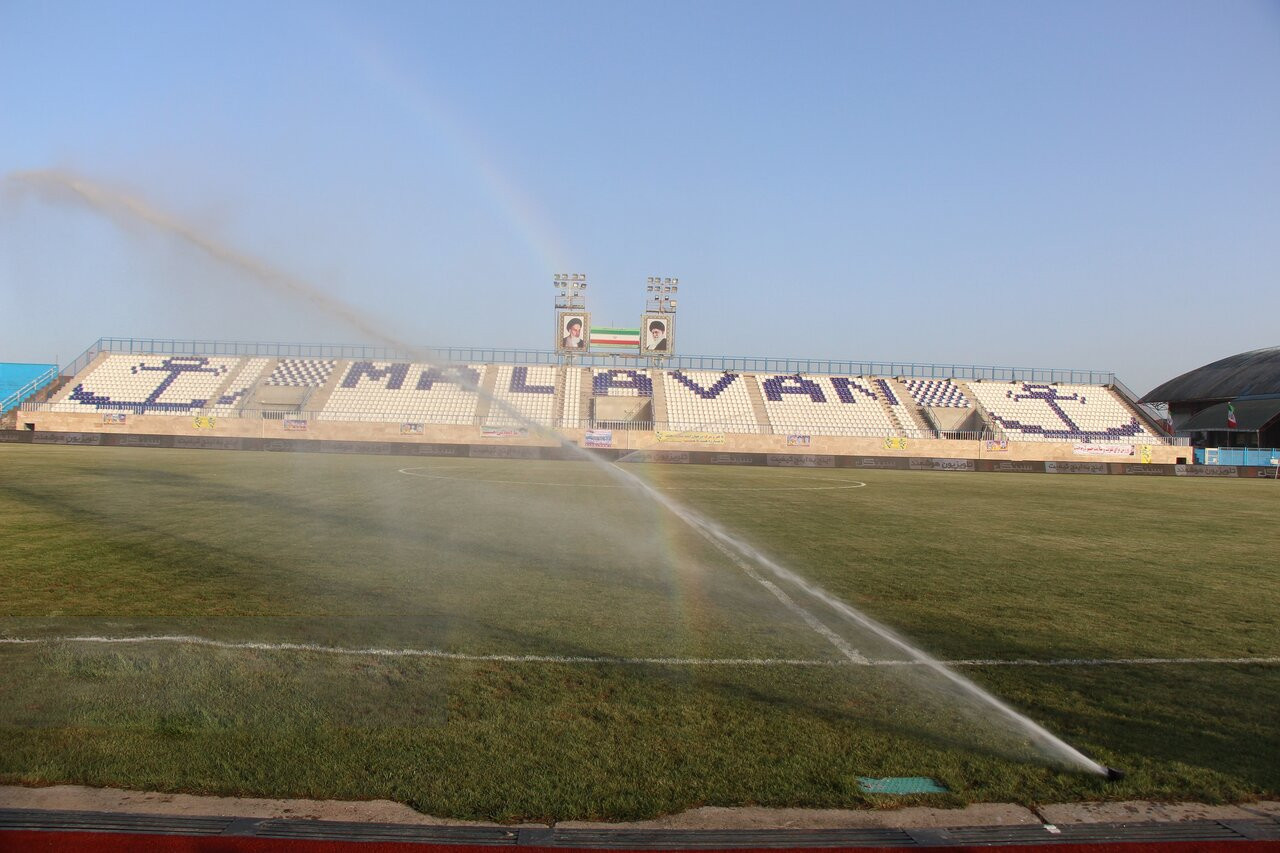
- Ghayeghran Stadium in August 2022
- Interactive map of Sirous Ghayeghran Stadium
- Full name: Sirous Ghayeghran Stadium
- Former names: 1953-1981: Diba Stadium; 1981-2022: Takhti Stadium
- Location: Anzali, Gilan, Iran
- Coordinates: 37°27′56″N 49°27′19″E
- Owner: Ministry of Sport and Youth
- Capacity: 9,000
- Surface: Grass

Construction
- Built: 1953
- Renovated: 2017; 2022

Tenant
- Malavan

Sirous Ghayeghran Stadium (Persian: ورزشگاه سیروس قایقران, Vârzeshgah-e Sirous Ghayeghran) is a football stadium in Bandar-e Anzali, Iran. It is the home stadium of Malavan.

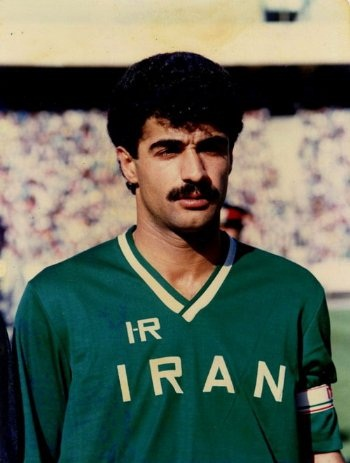
Ghayeghran played for Malavan between 1970–1987 and 1990–1991.

Founded in 1953 as Diba Stadium, this stadium is one of the oldest stadiums in Iran and has been renamed twice. It was first named Takhti in 1981 in honor of the prominent Iranian wrestler (Gholamreza Takhti), and for the second time, at the request of the team's fans in 2022, the name of the stadium was changed to honor club legend Sirous Ghayeghran.
