= Zahra Khajavi =

Iranian footballer (born 1999)

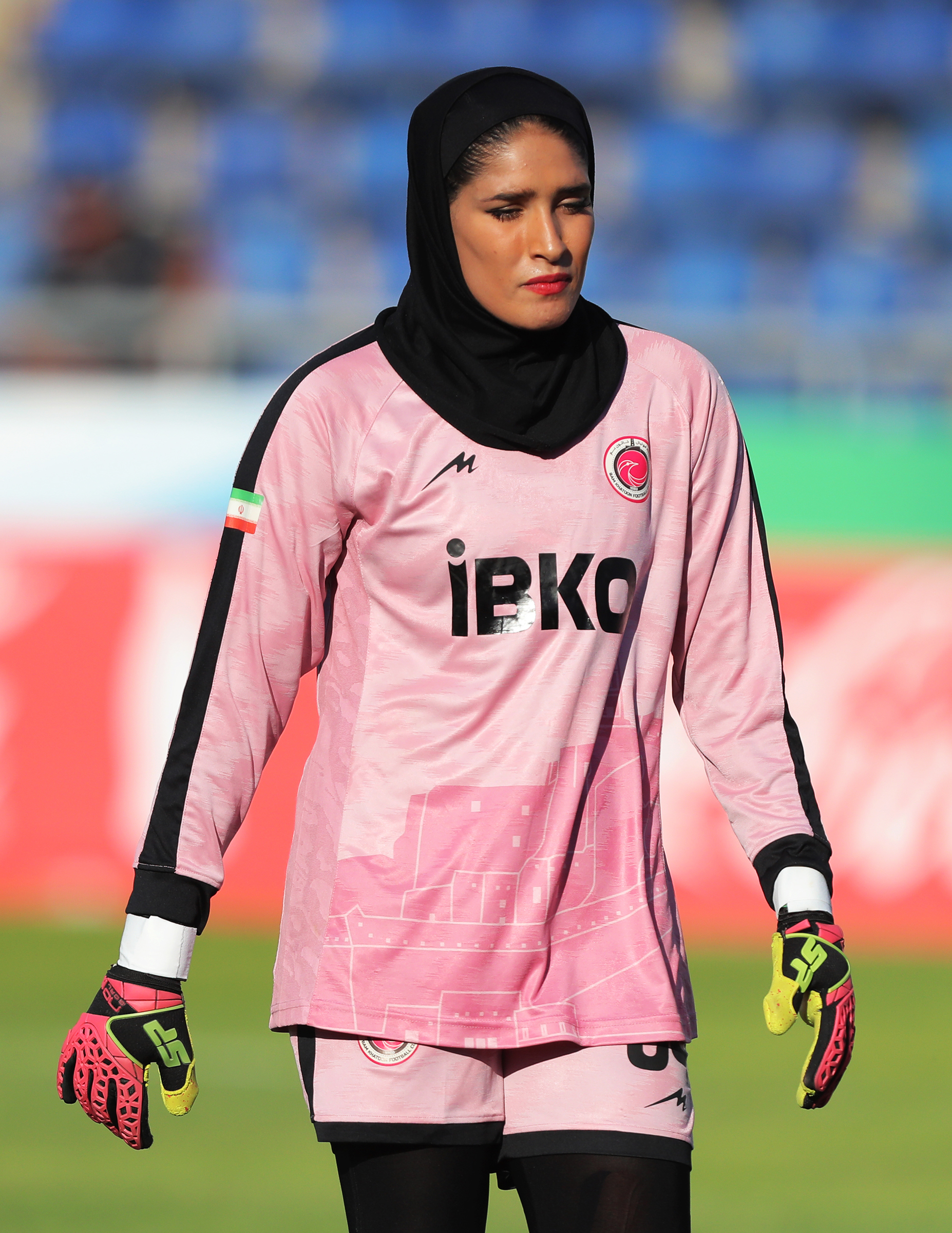
- Khajavi playing for Bam Khatoon F.C. in the AFC Women's Club Championship

Personal information
- Full name: Zahra Khajavi
- Date of birth: 8 February 1999 (age 27)
- Place of birth: Nahavand
- Height: 1.73 m (5 ft 8 in)
- Position: Goalkeeper

Team information
- Current team: Bam Khatoon F.C.
- Number: 54

Youth career
- Bam Khatoon F.C.

Senior career*
Years	Team	Apps	(Gls)
- Bam Khatoon F.C.

International career
2018–	Iran	13	(0)
- * Club domestic league appearances and goals

Zahra Khajavi (Persian: زهرا خواجوی; born 8 February 1999) is an Iranian professional footballer who plays as a goalkeeper for the Kowsar Women Football League club Bam Khatoon and the Iran women's national team. She is considered as one of the best Iranian goalkeepers of all time.

On 27 December 2019, Khajavi broke the clean sheet record of Iranian football by not conceding a goal for 953 minutes. She, along with Alireza Biranvand, are known as the record holders of the longest hand throws in Iranian football.

== Early life ==
Zahra Khajavi was born on 8 February 1999 in a Persian family in Nahavand. She was a multi-sport athlete growing up and began playing football at an early age. She even played handball and futsal professionally at early age. She started her professional football playing in Hamedan province football academy as a defender. At this time, she was known for her speed and pass ability.

While playing in Oshtorankuh Azna team, due to the lack of forwards in their team, she went to the field as a forward and managed to score the fastest goal in the history of Iranian women's football in the 30th second of the match.

She had the support of her family for her professional activity as a football player.

== Personal life ==
Khajavi usually talks to her mother about football and her professional career. She said herself, for marriage, she "prefers to choose someone who plays sports and football so that they understand each other's conditions more". She usually mentioned the "power of women" in football.

On 31 December 2025, Khajavi publicly supported the 2025–2026 Iranian protests, stating: "The punishment for the best and most loyal people in the world is not poverty and empty tables."

== Club career ==
=== Bam Khatoon ===
Khajavi joined Bam Khatoon F.C. in 2020. She played a key role in the team's victories and was one of the most important players of her team.

Some of her reactions in international competitions for her team were noticed by Iranian sports media. There has not been good media coverage for Iranian women's football in these years.

== International career ==
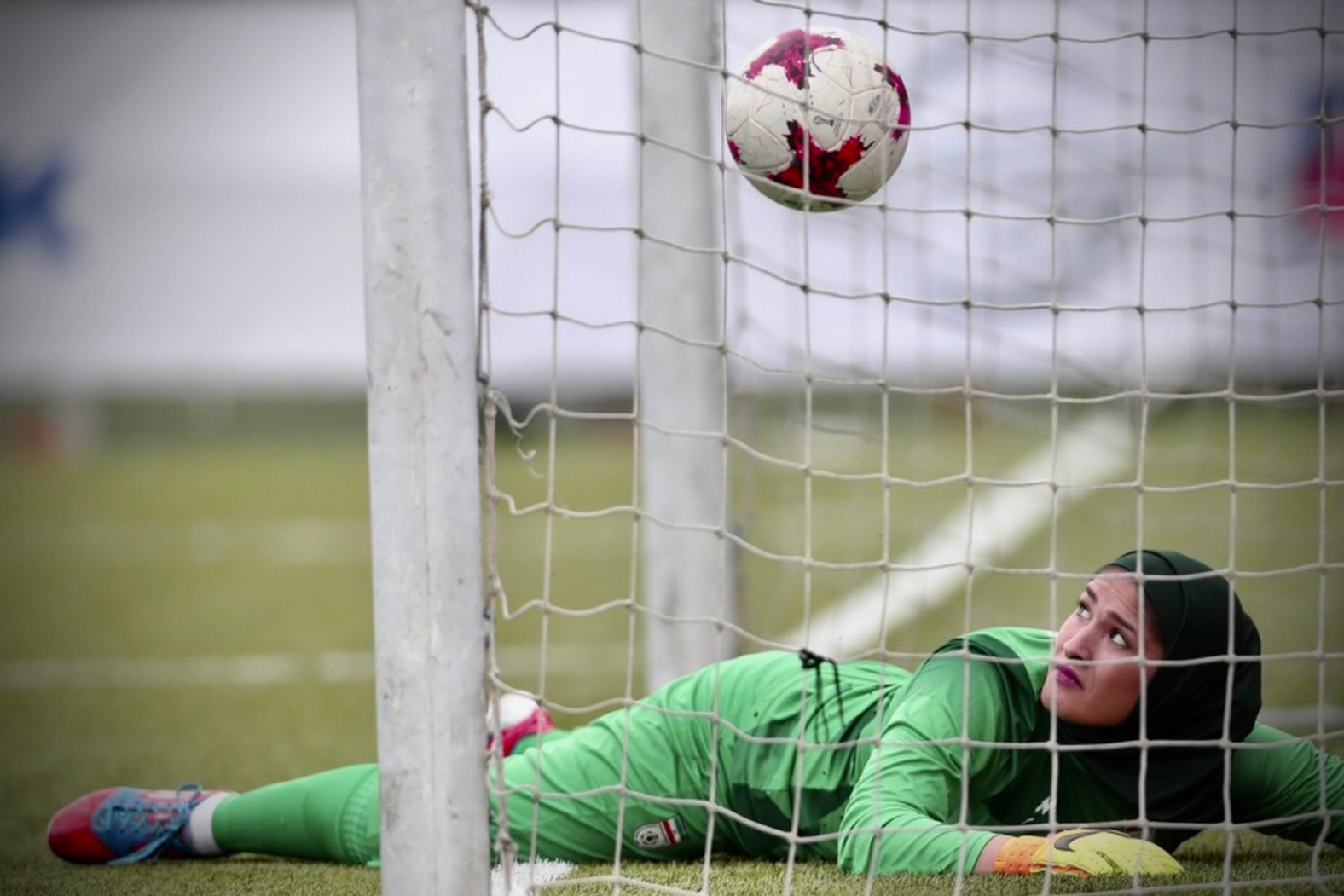
Khajavi playing for Iran in 2022

=== Iran ===
Khajavi is considered an important goalkeeper for the Iranian national football team, who was able to help the team win with her good performance in many important matches.

Khajavi was injured for some time and was not invited to the national team for a while. However, by being invited again, she was able to perform brilliantly and Khajavi was considered as the "Asian Eagle" by Varzesh 3.

== Style of play ==
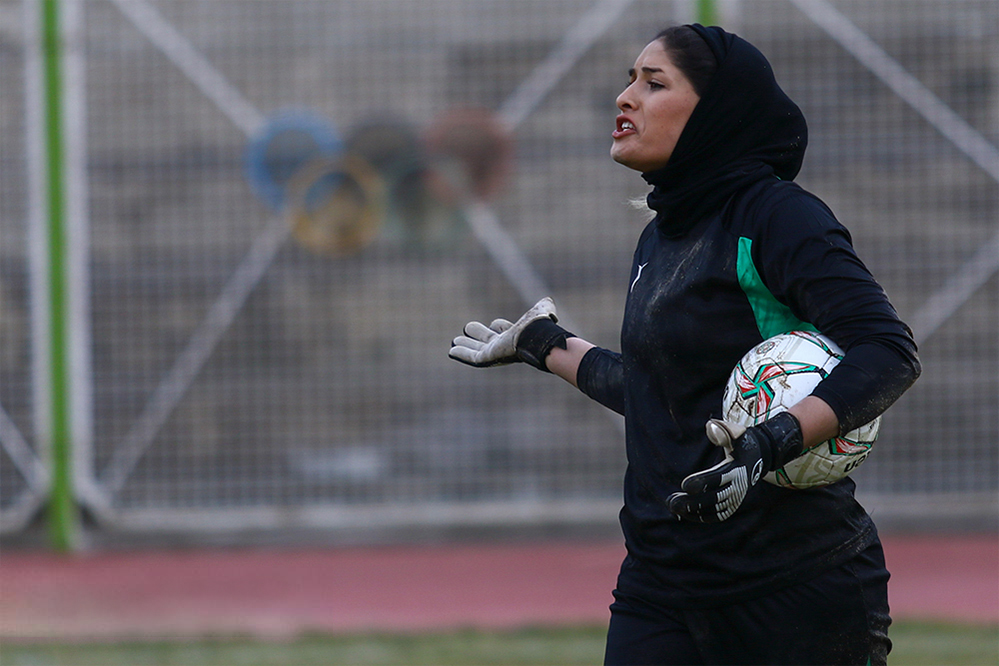
Khajavi In 2019

Khajavi is a "smart" and "flexible" goalkeeper, and her ability to play with her feet, quick reflexes and proper positioning are her distinctive features.
