= Esteghlal Women F.C. =

Esteghlal Ladies F.C.
- Full name: Esteghlal Ladies Football Club
- Short name: ELFC
- Founded: 1971; 55 years ago
- Head coach: Maryam Irandoost
- League: Kowsar League
Home colours	Away colours

Esteghlal Ladies Football Club, formerly known as Taj Ladies Football Club, is a women's professional football club based in Tehran.

== History ==
=== Formation ===
The club was formed in winter of 1971 as Taj by the Taj sports and cultural organization. Taj was the first female football club in Iran and the first step towards introducing football to Iranian girls and women.

The Iranian Revolution stopped Taj's activities.

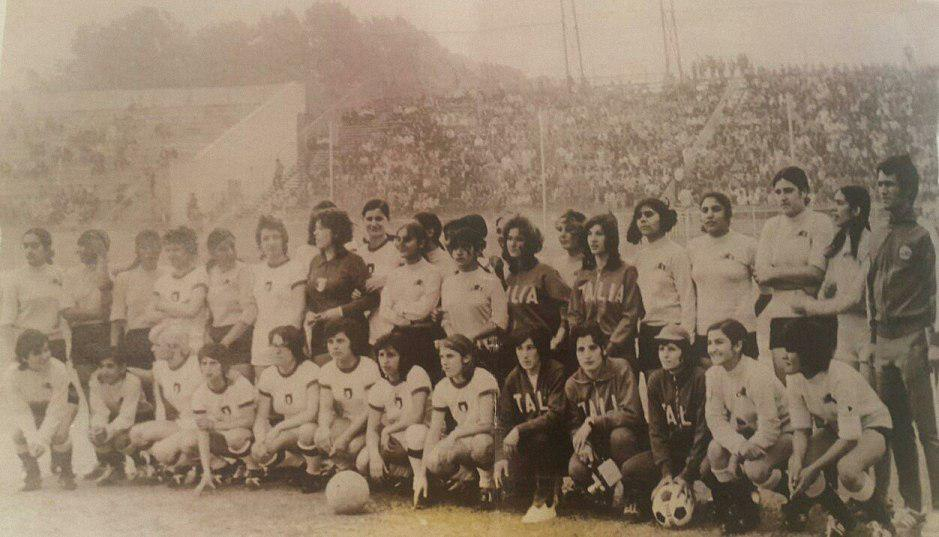
Taj LFC and a team of Italian female players and staff in a group photo prior to a friendly match on spring of 1971

=== First revival ===
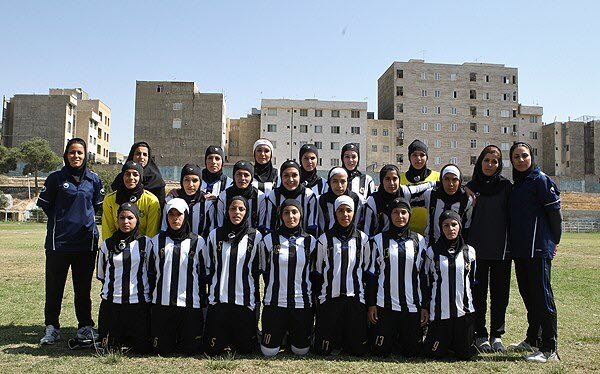
Esteghlal W.F.C. in 2012

In 2000s Esteghlal LFC, the new name of Taj after the revolution, restarted its activities and Esteghlal's academy had a section for girls football. In winter of 2009 a match between male and females youth teams which ended in 0–7 victory for the boys angered the authorities for breaching the country's strict gender segregation laws and put a stop on Esteghlal LFC activities for a second time in its history.

=== Second revival ===
A few years later during the tenure of a new chairman Ali Fathollahzadeh, Esteghlal restarted its ladies football section and participated in 3 seasons of the Iranian football league. On fall of 2016 and with a new chairman Esteghlal LFC stopped its activities for a third time. Financial difficulties was announced the main reason of this decision by Reza Eftekhari, then chairman of the club.

== See also ==
- List of Esteghlal F.C. records and statistics
- List of Esteghlal F.C. honours
- Persepolis F.C. (women)

== Bibliography ==
- Ahmadi, Seyyed Ali Akbar (21 December 2009). Esteghlal Full History of the Club from Docharkheh Savaran and Taj to Esteghlal. Paygan. ISBN 978-600-5096-54-5.
