= Persepolis W.F.C. =

Coordinates: 35°46′23.95″N 51°23′35.15″E

Persepolis (Women)
- Full name: Persepolis Women Football Club
- Nicknames: Persepolis Girls; Tehran Reds; Tehran Lionesses
- Founded: 1968; 58 years ago October 2024; 2 years ago (reestablished)
- Ground: Shahid Kazemi Stadium
- Capacity: 15,000
- Owner(s): Persepolis Athletic and Cultural Club (Bank Shahr: 30% Bank Mellat: 20% Tejarat Bank: 20% Bank Saderat Iran: 5.175% Refah Bank: 5% EN Bank: 5% Shahr Financial Group: 3.715% Public Shareholders: 11.11% – IFB: PSPP1)
- President: Peyman Haddadi
- Head coach: Niloofar Ardalan
- League: Kowsar League
- 2025–26: Kowsar League, 7th of 10
- Website: http://fc-perspolis.com
Home colours	Away colours

Persepolis W.F.C. is an Iranian professional women's football club based in Tehran, Iran. It is the women's football section of Persepolis F.C. and competes in the Iranian Kowsar Women League, playing home games at the Shahid Kazemi Stadium.

Persepolis women's team was originally founded in the early 1970s as part of the multisport Persepolis Athletic and Cultural Club, contributing to the early development of women's football in Iran alongside teams like Taj and Deyham. However, following the 1979 Iranian Revolution, the women's section was disbanded due to government policies restricting women's sports activities. The team was re-established in 2024, marking a historic return to women's football after over four decades of inactivity. In its reformed era, Persepolis Women achieved rapid success.

Persepolis Women share the fanbase of the men's Persepolis F.C., an Iranian club. They receive support from a group referred to as the "Red Army" through social media and match attendance. Persepolis Women play their home matches at Shahid Kazemi Stadium, which has a capacity of 15,000, after using Marghoobkar Stadium and Derafshifar Stadium for earlier fixtures. Their red kits and logo are inspired by symbols from Persepolis, the capital of the Achaemenid Empire, and they are referred to as the Red Lionesses or Tehran Lionesses.

== History ==
=== 1970s ===
Women's football in Iran started in 1970. Women were participating in male football competitions in alleys and streets, and also took part in some men's football games. During that time, when numerous trainers participated in the top grade of FIFA's training courses in Japan, they were able to see the Japan women's national football team's games against female teams from Korea, Singapore and India. From 1970, serious measures were taken in order to reach appropriate standards. Thereafter, women took part first in football training and then in football teams such as Taj, Deyhim, Persepolis and Oghab . By organizing different competitions between those teams, the best players were selected and placed in the first Iranian women's national team. This team was composed of former volleyball players, basketball players and athletes aged from 12 to 18. They started to train more seriously as sport magazines published the news of their progress, then gradually a large number of female fans arose to support the team. With the help of educational institutions across the country, talented youngsters were scouted.

The first head coach for the winning women's team in Iran was Alan Rogers (from Persepolis), who was also the coach of the men's team at the same time.

Rebuilding the team in 2022 was on the agenda.

=== 2020s ===
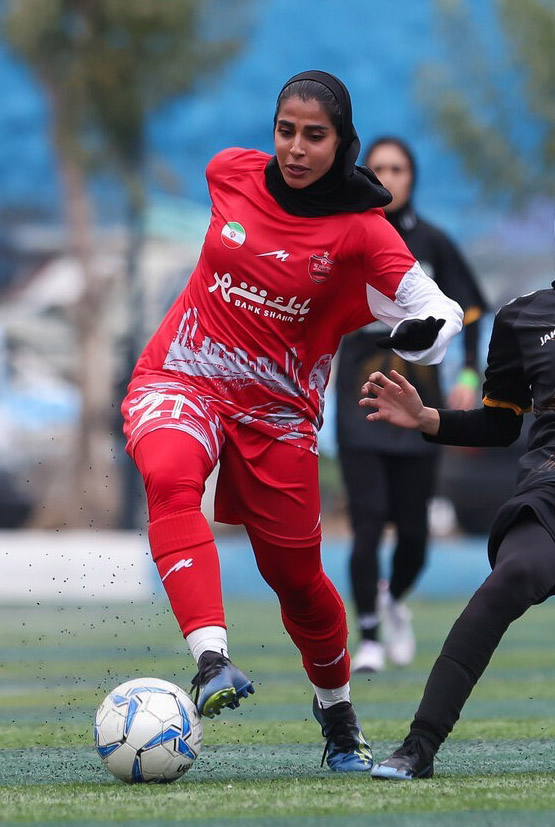
Fatemeh Safarastgu in the team's first match after re-establishment on November 14, 2024.

On October 12, 2024, it was announced that, after facing many oppositions and challenges, Persepolis acquired the rights of the "Ako Kermanshah Women's Football Team" in the Women's League of Iran. Thus, Persepolis re-established its women's football section, marking a significant step in its sports history by returning to the women's football scene.

Shortly after its launch in October 2024, Persepolis Football Club issued a call for capable female footballers. In just two days, over 300 girls participated in the team's training tests. The revival of Persepolis Women's Football Team sparked significant excitement and enthusiasm among Iranian girls interested in football, as more than 500 girls applied to join the team within five days.

2024–25 Persepolis F.C.Women season finished by winning the Division One.

== Team image ==
=== Logo ===
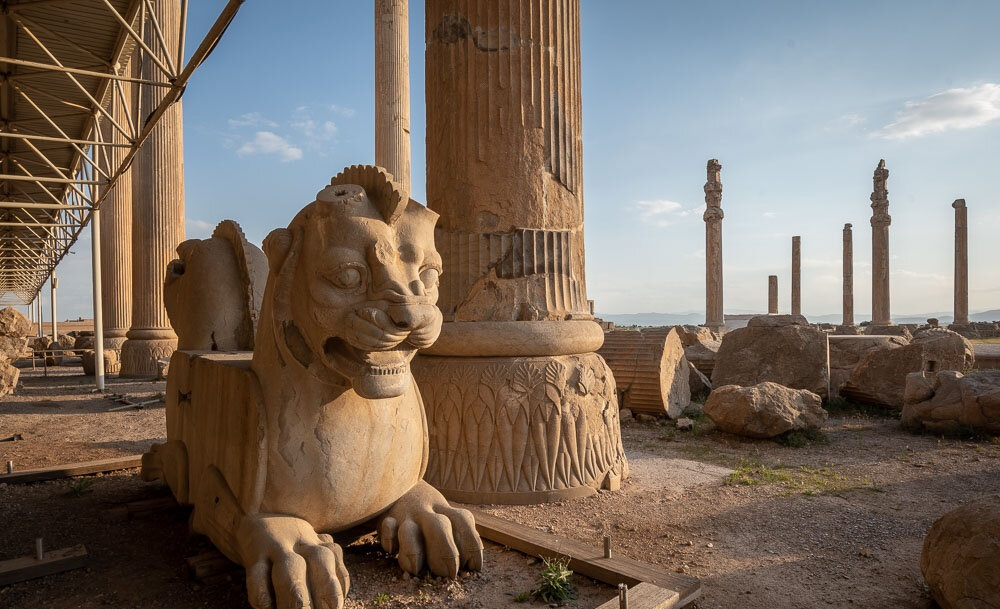
The Persian column from Persepolis serves as a symbol for the team.

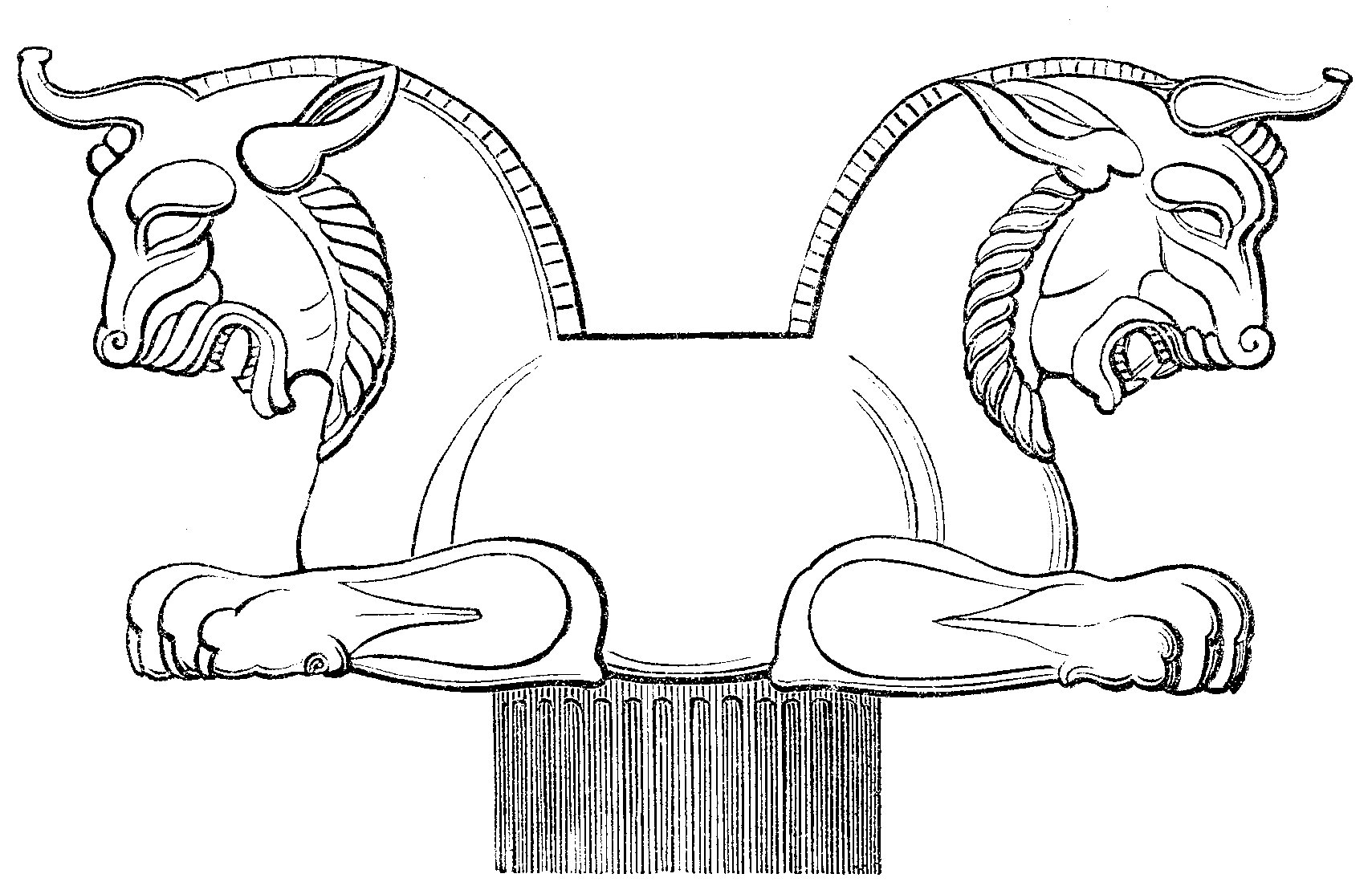
An illustration of a column at Apadana, from the Illustrerad verldshistoria utgifven

Persepolis Football Club was named after Persepolis, the capital of the Achaemenid Empire. The club logo incorporates elements from the location. The first design of Persepolis' crest used the Faravahar, an ancient Persian and Zoroastrian symbol depicting a man with three-feathered falcon wings. After using the crest on its shirt in its early years, the team stopped including the crest on its shirt until the 1980s. In the middle of the 1980s, the team created a new crest based on an image depicted on a column at Apadana. The image consists of two bull heads attached to one body, with a cup on top and the Olympic symbols underneath. The bull is a symbol of productivity in ancient Persian beliefs and Persian Literature, and the cup on the top of the column represents the championship. The team then changed the crest again in the middle of the 1990s to a more stylised image: the crest became bent and the Olympic rings were dropped, the cup became more explicit, and the bull heads leaned toward the cup. This version was used until 2004, when the team restored the Olympic rings and replaced the bulls with the Homa, a mythological bird and symbol used in the architecture of Persepolis. During the 2011–2012 season, and before 74th Tehran derby, the club released a new version of its logo This current version of the club's logo incorporates the previous version into a red shield-shaped frame and includes the name of Persepolis in Persian and English.

=== Colors and kits ===
The women’s team, like the men’s team of the club, uses a first red kit and a secondary white kit. The team’s nicknames include “Red Army” and “Red Lionesses.” Another unofficial nickname attributed to them on social media is “Red Devils”.

=== Media ===
The women’s team has accounts on social media. In October 2024, its Instagram account was launched.

== Grounds ==
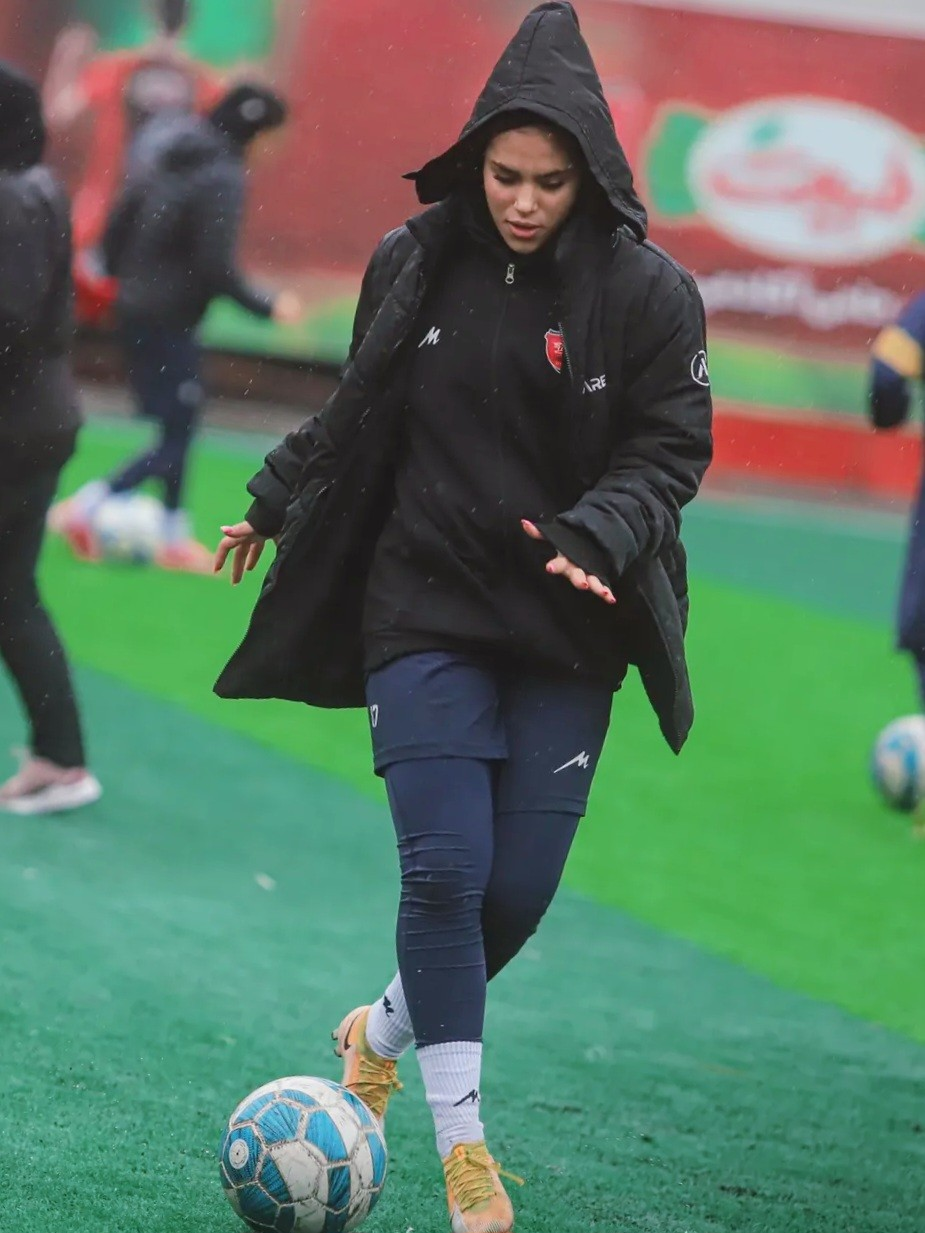
Team’s training at Derafshifar Stadium in 2025

In 2024, the Persepolis Women’s Football Club designated Marghoobkar Stadium as its initial home ground. This arrangement lasted until November 2024, when the team relocated its home matches to Derafshifar Stadium. Subsequently, a decision was made to establish Kazemi Stadium as the club’s new permanent home venue, reflecting efforts to enhance facilities for the team.

== Supporters and rivalries ==
The Persepolis Women’s Football Team, known as the “Lionesses of Tehran” and the “Red Army,” is among the most popular women’s football clubs in Iran. This popularity has largely been influenced by the fame of the club’s men’s team, as the women’s team had no activity for nearly half a century (due to government policies following the 1979 Revolution). Persepolis fans typically react to team news and support the players.

== Players ==
Note: Flags indicate national team as defined under FIFA eligibility rules; some limited exceptions apply. Players may hold more than one non-FIFA nationality.

No.	Pos.	Nation	Player
1	GK	IRI	Zahra Khajavi
2	DF	IRI	Kimia Abbaszadeh
4	DF	IRI	Zeinab Abbaspour
5	DF	IRI	Elham Abdolrahmani
6	FW	IRI	Mohaddeseh Zolfi
7	FW	IRI	Fereshteh Karimi
8	DF	IRI	Behnaz Taherkhani
9	MF	IRI	Zahra Ghanbari (captain)
10	MF	IRI	Maedeh Birang
11	DF	IRI	Zahra Ahmadizadeh (Vice captain)
13	DF	IRI	Mohaddeseh Amiri
14	MF	IRI	Maryam Safarastgoo
17	DF	IRI	Elaheh Afshardoust
18	MF	IRI	Maryam Rahideh

No.	Pos.	Nation	Player
19	FW	IRI	Fatemeh Rezaei
20	FW	IRI	Soheila Shirali
21	FW	IRI	Fatemeh Safarastgoo
22	GK	IRI	Atena Tofigh
23	DF	IRI	Fatemeh Rezaei
27	FW	IRI	Somayeh Avaj
29	DF	IRI	Sepideh Taheri
40	GK	IRI	Samira Mohammadi
44	DF	IRI	Halaleh Abdollahi
71	MF	IRI	Marzieh Nikkhah
77	FW	IRI	Somayeh Esmaeili
79	DF	IRI	Kimia Abdi
80	MF	IRI	Mahsa Alimadadi
99	DF	IRI	Samaneh Ghamari

== Technical staff ==
=== Azmoon staff ===
Position	Staff
Head coach	(Iran) Niloofar Ardalan
Assistant coach	(Iran) Tahereh Mobarra
Assistant coach and Analyzer	(Iran) Shaghayegh Faskhoudi
Doctor	(Iran) Maryam Najafi
Physiotherapists	(Iran) Maral Esmaeilinia (Iran) Maryam Manavi
Massage therapists	(Iran) Elmira Alipour (Iran) Sepideh Ghasemnejad
Team Manager	(Iran) Shahrzad Nasiri
Media Officer	(Iran) Zeinab Manjiri
Photographer	(Iran) Ghazal Khoddam
Support	(Iran) Sahar Jafari

== Recent seasons ==
The table below chronicles the achievements of Persepolis F.C. (women) in various competitions since 2024.

Year	Division	Position	Hazfi Cup	AWCL
2024-25	1st Division	1st	Not held	did not qualify
2025-26	Kowsar League	7th	Not held	did not qualify

== Sponsorship ==
- Main sponsor: Shahr Bank
- Official shirt manufacturer: Merooj
- Sponsor 2:
- Water supplier: Veensu

== See also ==
Reserve teams

- Persepolis Academy
- Persepolis B
- Persepolis Qaemshahr
- Persepolis Shomal
