= Enghelab Stadium =

Stadium in Karaj, Iran

Coordinates: 35°51′02″N 50°57′30″E

- Interactive map of Enghelab Stadium
- Full name: Enghelab Stadium
- Location: Karaj, Iran
- Owner: Saipa
- Capacity: 15,000
- Surface: Grass

Construction
- Built: 2001
- Opened: 2006

Tenants
- Gol Reyhan (2015–present); Saipa (2001–2015)

The Enghelab Stadium (Persian: ورزشگاه انقلاب کرج) is a multi-purpose stadium in Karaj, Iran. Currently, it is currently mostly used for football matches and is the home of football team Saipa as of 2001. It has a capacity of 15,000 people.

The stadium held the final match of the league in 2006–07 season for Saipa where they won the league.

== International matches ==
The Iran national football team has occasionally used Enghelab Stadium as their home base.

26 May 2009 Unofficial Friendly	Iran	5–0	Indonesia U23
--:-- IRST	Own goal 20'; Zandi 54', 88'; Borhani 63'; Khalatbari 72'			Attendance: 20,000; Referee: Alireza Faghani

1 May 2012 Friendly	Iran	3–0	Mozambique
12:00 IRST	Gholami 10'; Dehnavi 40'; Nouri 58'			Attendance: 7,165; Referee: Saeid Bakhshizadeh

3 March 2014 2015 AFC Asian Cup qualification	Iran	3–2	Kuwait
17:30 IRST	Karimi 2'; Sadeghian 61'; Ansarifard 90+1'		Ali 18'; Al-Rashidi 89'	Attendance: 14,332; Referee: Dmitriy Mashentsev

== Other facilities ==
=== Enghelab Indoor Stadium ===
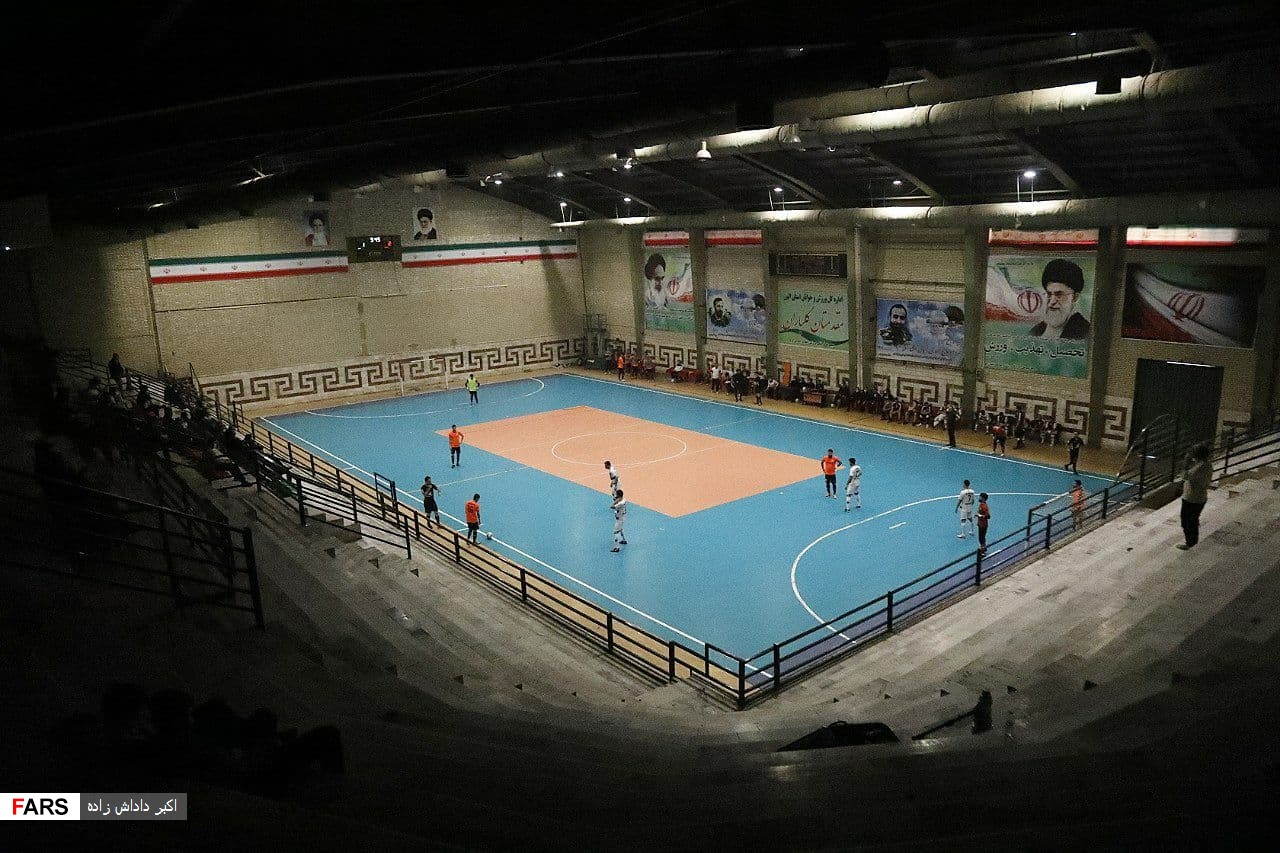
Enghelab Indoor Stadium

Enghelab Indoor Stadium is an indoor sports arena in Karaj. The stadium has a seating capacity of 2,500. It is mainly used for volleyball and futsal. The arena hosted the 2003 AFC Futsal Championship.
