= Zahra Ghanbari =

Iranian footballer (born 1992)

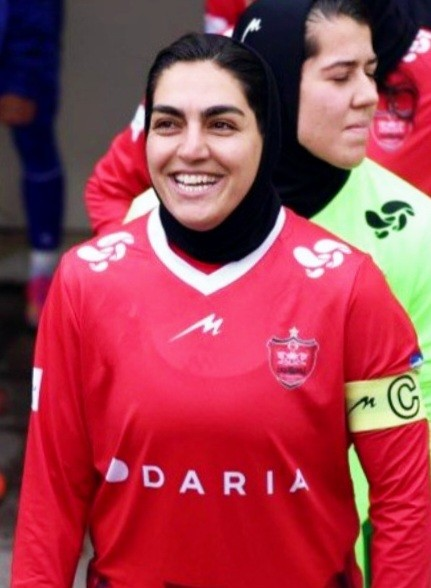
- Ghanbari with Persepolis in 2025

Personal information
- Full name: Zahra Ghanbari
- Date of birth: 4 March 1992 (age 34)
- Place of birth: Kangavar, Kermanshah, Iran
- Height: 1.71 m (5 ft 7 in)
- Position: Forward

Team information
- Current team: Persepolis
- Number: 99

Senior career*
Years	Team	Apps	(Gls)
- Ghaz Al-Shamal SC
2013–2025	Bam Khatoon FC		
2020–2021	Vechan Kurdistan		
2025–	Persepolis WFC		

International career^{‡}
2008	Iran U19		
2007–	Iran	17	(22)
- * Club domestic league appearances and goals ‡ National team caps and goals as of March 2026

Zahra Ghanbari (Persian: زهرا قنبری; born 4 March 1992) is an Iranian professional footballer who plays as a forward for the Kowsar Women Football League club Persepolis and the Iran national team. She is Iran's all-time top goalscorer.

== Early life and education ==
Zahra Ghanbari was born on 4 March 1992 in Kangavar, Kermanshah, Iran. Kermanshah is the largest Kurdish-populated city in Iran and one of the most significant urban centres of Kurdish culture in the region, and Ghanbari is Kurdish.

== Club career ==
Ghanbari has played in Iraq for the Ghaz Al-Shamal SC women's team (North Gas Sports Club) team in Kirkuk, which plays in the Iraqi Women's Football League.

In Iran, she has played for Bam Khatoon F.C. (formerly known as Shahrdari Bam) since at least 2013. She played for Vechan Kurdistan in 2020/2021.

Ghanbari played for Bam Khatoon in the 2023 AFC Women's Club Championship and the 2024–25 AFC Women's Champions League, scoring one goal in the latter tournament. In November 2024, Ghanbari was briefly suspended by the Iranian federation and forced to apologise for "improper hijab" during a goal celebration at the 2024–25 AFC Women's Champions League. After being forced to apologise, she was allowed to return to the team.

She moved to Persepolis in 2025.

== International career ==
Ghanbari is Iran's national team's all-time top goalscorer.

She played for the international team in the following tournaments (number of goals in parentheses):

- AFC Women's Asian Cup 2008 (1), 2018 (6), 2022 (0)
- AFC U-19 Women's Championship 2009 (2)
- Women's Olympic Football Tournament 2020 (6)
- AFC Women's Olympic Qualifying Tournament 2024 (0)
- AFC Women's Asian Cup 2026

On 9 March 2026, after the national team was eliminated from the 2026 AFC Women's Asian Cup in Australia, Ghanbari (who played in all three games), along with four teammates from the Iranian women's national football team, left the team's training camp in Australia and sought asylum. This was due to concerns about possible retaliation from Iranian authorities after the team had refrained from singing the national anthem after the opening game, which was shortly after the start of the 2026 Iran war. The Australian Government granted humanitarian visas to the players. On 15 March, Iranian state media reported that Ghanbari had withdrawn her asylum application and would return to Iran via Malaysia.

Ghanbari was one of a number of Iranians to have their assets seized by the Iranian Government, but they were released by a court decision around 12 April 2026, based on her "change in behaviour".

== Career statistics ==
No.	Date	Venue	Opponent	Score	Result	Competition
1.	4 October 2011	Zayed Sports City Stadium, Abu Dhabi, UAE	Lebanon	8–1	8–1	2011 WAFF Women's Championship
2.	5 April 2017	Vietnam YFT Center, Hanoi, Vietnam	Singapore	1–0	6–0	2018 AFC Women's Asian Cup qualification
3.	9 April 2017	Vietnam YFT Center, Hanoi, Vietnam	Vietnam	1–0	1–6	2018 AFC Women's Asian Cup qualification
4.	11 April 2017	Vietnam YFT Center, Hanoi, Vietnam	Syria	1–0	12–0	2018 AFC Women's Asian Cup qualification
5.	11 April 2017	Vietnam YFT Center, Hanoi, Vietnam	Syria	5–0	12–0	2018 AFC Women's Asian Cup qualification
6.	11 April 2017	Vietnam YFT Center, Hanoi, Vietnam	Syria	9–0	12–0	2018 AFC Women's Asian Cup qualification
7.	11 April 2017	Vietnam YFT Center, Hanoi, Vietnam	Syria	11–0	12–0	2018 AFC Women's Asian Cup qualification
8.	8 November 2018	Institute of Physical Education Stadium, Chonburi, Thailand	Lebanon	2–0	8–0	2020 AFC Women's Olympic Qualifying Tournament
9.	8 November 2018	Institute of Physical Education Stadium, Chonburi, Thailand	Lebanon	4–0	8–0	2020 AFC Women's Olympic Qualifying Tournament
10.	8 November 2018	Institute of Physical Education Stadium, Chonburi, Thailand	Lebanon	6–0	8–0	2020 AFC Women's Olympic Qualifying Tournament
11.	25 November 2018	Milliy Stadium, Tashkent, Uzbekistan	Afghanistan	1–0	6–0	2018 CAFA Women's Championship
12.	25 November 2018	Milliy Stadium, Tashkent, Uzbekistan	Afghanistan	3–0	6–0	2018 CAFA Women's Championship
13.	6 April 2019	Saoud bin Abdulrahman Stadium, Al Wakrah, Qatar	Palestine	7–0	9–0	2020 AFC Women's Olympic Qualifying Tournament
14.	6 April 2019	Saoud bin Abdulrahman Stadium, Al Wakrah, Qatar	Palestine	8–0	9–0	2020 AFC Women's Olympic Qualifying Tournament
15.	9 April 2019	Grand Hamad Stadium, Doha, Qatar	Chinese Taipei	1–4	1–4	2020 AFC Women's Olympic Qualifying Tournament
16.	15 November 2022	Ararat Stadium, Tehran, Iran	Belarus	1–0	1–1	Friendly
17.	10 June 2025	National Football Center Field 2, Tehran, Iran	Iraq	3–0	8–0	Friendly
18.	10 June 2025	National Football Center Field 2, Tehran, Iran	Iraq	5–0	8–0	Friendly
19.	10 June 2025	National Football Center Field 2, Tehran, Iran	Iraq	?–0	8–0	Friendly
20.	10 July 2025	King Abdullah II Stadium, Amman, Jordan	Singapore	4–0	4–0	2026 AFC Women's Asian Cup qualification
21.	13 July 2025	King Abdullah II Stadium, Amman, Jordan	Bhutan	5–1	7–1	2026 AFC Women's Asian Cup qualification
22.	24 October 2025	Jawaharlal Nehru Stadium, Shillong, India	Nepal	2–0	3–0	Friendly
