= Malavan W.F.C. =

Women's football club in Bandar Anzali, Iran

Malavan ملوان
- Full name: Malavan Bandar Anzali Football Club (women)
- Nicknames: Ghou-ye Sepid (The White Swan); Malavānān (The Sailors)
- Short name: Malavan
- Founded: 1969; 57 years ago
- Ground: Sardar Jangal Stadium, Ghayeghran Stadium
- Capacity: 25,000
- Chairman: Arash Fahmide
- Manager: Azam Gholami
- League: Kowsar Women Football League
- Website: http://malavanfc.com
Home colours	Away colours

Malavan Bandar Anzali Women Football Club, commonly referred to as just Malavan, is an Iranian professional women's football club based in Bandar-e Anzali, Iran. The club plays in the Iranian Women's League, the top tier of Iranian women's football. Malavan women were founded in 1969.

Malavan play their home games primarily at the Sardar Jangal Stadium. They have a fan culture that attracts local fans to the stadium in the province.

== History ==
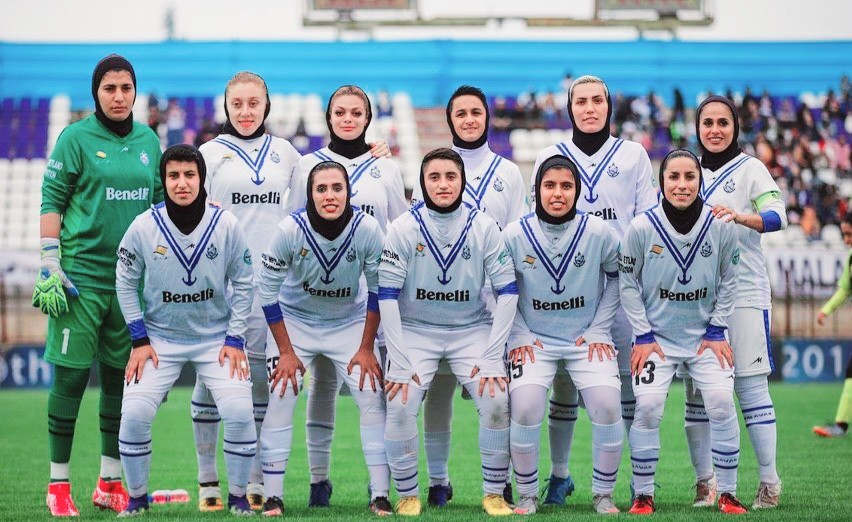
Team squad in 2022.

Although the first Malavan amateur women's football team was formed at the same time as the men's team (1969), it never became professional until the start of the Kowsar League.

== Team image and kits ==
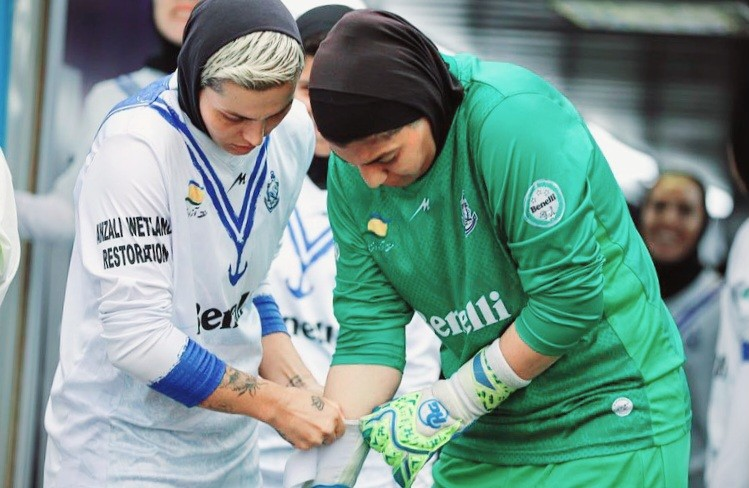
Team first kits in 2022.

The team kit is the same as the men's team kit. The colors are chosen like the men's team every season. White has always been the main color of the team and has become a symbol among fans.

== Stadium ==
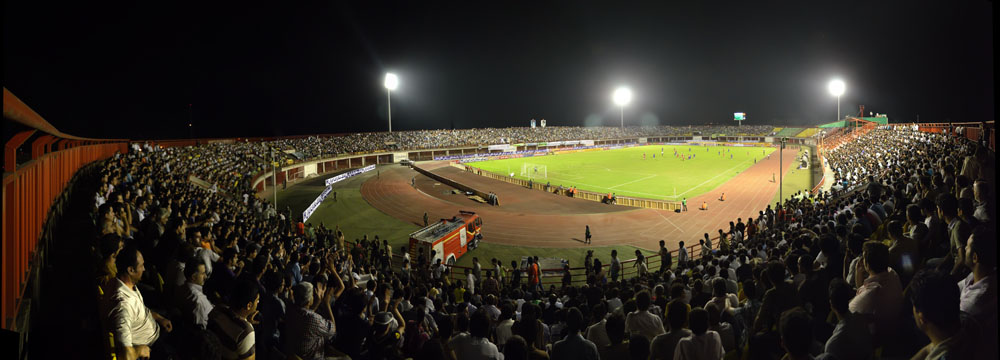
Sardar Jangal Stadium.

Malavan women played the majority of their home matches at Sardar Jangal Stadium. The ground opened in 2007 and has a capacity of 25,000. The stadium located in Rasht, Iran.

== Players ==
Many players of the Iranian women's national football team have played for the club.

== Management and staff ==
The head coach is Azam Gholami.

== Honours ==
- Iranian Women's Football League: 2009–10
- Hazfi Cup (women): 2013–14
