= Sepahan L.F.C. =

Iranian football club

Sepahan
- Full name: Sepahan Ladies Football Club
- Nickname(s): Sepahan Girls
- Ground: Resalat Stadium, Najafabad
- Capacity: 5,000
- Manager: Samieh Shahbazi
- League: Kowsar Women Football League

Sepahan Ladies Football Club is an Iranian women's football club based in Isfahan, Isfahan province who play in Kowsar Women Football League.

The team was known as Ayandehsazan Mihan until 2017 when they ran into financial problems and were taken over by the popular men's football team Sepahan.

== History ==
In the 2016–17 season, Ayandehsazan finished first in the Kowsar Women Football League to claim their first league championship.
