= Kowsar Women's League =

Association football league in Iran

- Organising body: Iran Football League Organization
- Founded: 2007; 19 years ago
- Country: Iran
- Confederation: AFC
- Number of clubs: 10 (since 2020–21)
- Level on pyramid: 1
- Relegation to: 1st Division League
- Domestic cup(s): Hazfi Cup; Super Cup
- International cup: AFC Women's Champions League
- Current champions: Bam Khatoon (11th title)
- Most championships: Bam Khatoon (11 titles)
- Broadcaster: IRIB channels
- Website: www.iranleague.ir
- Current: 2026–27

The Kowsar Women's League (Persian: لیگ کوثر بانوان, Lig-e Kâuser-e Banuan-e) is a women's football league, run by the Football Federation Islamic Republic of Iran (FFIRI). At the top of the Iranian football league system, it is the country's primary competition for the sport. It was established in 2007.

== History ==
The idea of founding the National Women's Football League in Iran dates back to the late Pahlavi era. During that period, important steps were taken to create a strong women's club football system in Iran. In those years, Tehrani clubs were the pioneers of women's club football in Iran.

Kowsar Women's League was founded in 2007 with international standards.

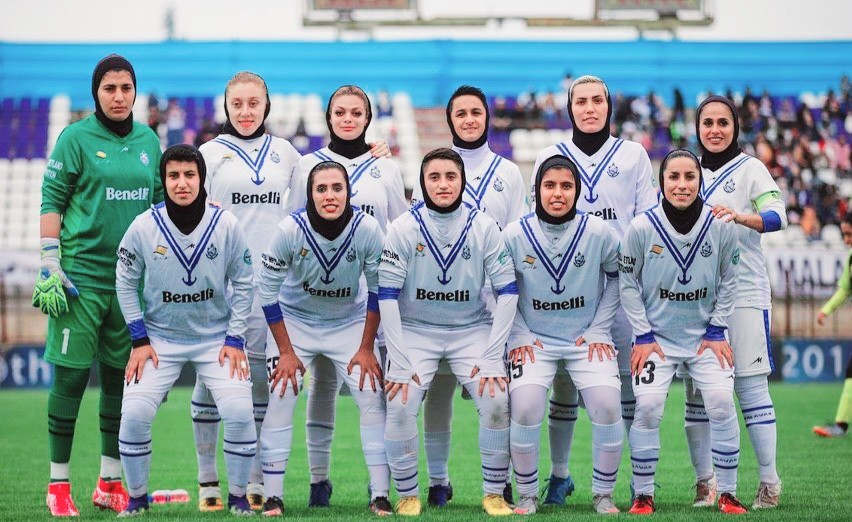
Malavan squad in 2022

In July 2019, the FFIRI signed a contract with Pars Oil Company for the sponsorship of Iran's football referees, including the (male) Pro League, women referees in the Women's League, and futsal league, and received shirts with the company. However, female Pro League referees lodged a complaint against unpaid wages, which led to their dismissal, in violation of the Federation's statute. After the chairman of the FFIRI's Referees Committee intervened, all of the women were backpaid, but were then terminated and disqualified.

Until 2024, Bam Khatoon F.C. dominated the league for years and was also known as an Asian power. They were usually in serious competition with Malavan W.F.C and they usually won against them. Malavan has a special fan culture in the league and attracts many fans to their stadium. Shahrdari Sirjan's team has usually been a serious competitor for the championship too.

In 2024, the Iranian Football Federation proposed a change in the number of teams in the league in order to facilitate the establishment of a women's team by the clubs of the Persian Gulf Pro League. Proposals to change the league rules were discussed.

== Seasons ==
Kowsar Women's League Champions
Season	Champions	Runners-up
2007–08	Bal Gostar	Malavan
2009–10	Malavan	Oghab Mazandaran
2010–11	Shen Sa Arak	Malavan
2011–12	Bam Khatoon	Sorkh Poushan Gorgan
2012–13	Bam Khatoon	Malavan
2013–14	Bam Khatoon	Malavan
2014–15	Bam Khatoon	Malavan
2015–16	Shahrdari Sirjan	Malavan
2016–17	Ayande Sazan Mihan	Bam Khatoon
2017–18	Bam Khatoon	Shahrdari Sirjan
2018–19	Bam Khatoon	Shahrdari Sirjan
2019–20	Bam Khatoon	Vechan Kurdistan
2020–21	Shahrdari Sirjan	Bam Khatoon
2021–22	Bam Khatoon	Shahrdari Sirjan
2022–23	Bam Khatoon	Sepahan
2023–24	Bam Khatoon	Malavan
2024–25	Bam Khatoon	Sepahan

== Current clubs ==
2026–27 Kowsar Women's League table

Pos	Team	Pld	W	D	L	GF	GA	GD	Pts	Qualification or relegation
1	Persepolis	6	5	0	1	12	3	+9	15	Qualification for the 2027–28 AFC Women's Champions League stage
2	Gol Gohar	6	3	3	0	12	5	+7	12	
3	Khatoon	5	3	2	0	16	2	+14	11	
4	Sepahan	5	3	1	1	8	2	+6	10	
5	Esteghlal	6	3	1	2	10	9	+1	10	
6	Eesta	6	1	3	2	2	3	−1	6	
7	Varesh	6	2	0	4	5	13	−8	6	
8	Ava	6	1	2	3	4	11	−7	5	
9	Malavan	6	1	0	5	3	16	−13	3	Relegation to 2027–28 Iran Women's Football 1st Division
10	Palayesh Gaz	6	0	2	4	0	8	−8	2	Relegation to 2027–28 Iran Women's Football 1st Division

Updated to match(es) played on 3 November 2026. Source: League Full Table
Rules for classification: 1) Points; 2) Head-to-head points; 3) Head-to-head goal difference; 4) Total goal difference; 5) Total goals scored; 6) Fair-play points.
(Note: Head-to-head record is used only after all the matches between the teams in question have been played).

== Champions ==
Club	Winners	Runners-up	Winning seasons
Bam Khatoon	11	2	2011–12, 2012–13, 2013–14, 2014–15, 2017–18, 2018–19, 2019–20, 2021–22, 2022–23, 2023–24, 2024–25
Shahrdari Sirjan	2	3	2015–16, 2020–21
Malavan	1	7	2009–10
Shen Sa Arak	1	-	2010–11
Bal Gostar	1	-	2007–08
Ayande Sazan Mihan	1	-	2016–17
Sepahan	-	2	
Sorkh Poushan Gorgan	-	1	
Oghab Mazandaran	-	1	
Vuchan Kurdistan	-	1	

== Top goalscorers ==
Season	Player	Team	Goals
2009-10	Sara Ghomi	Malavan	26
2010-11	Bayan Mahmoud		32
2011-12	Sara Ghomi	Malavan	47
2012-13	Maryam Rahimi		47
2013-14	Sara Ghomi	Malavan	35
2014-15	Sara Ghomi	Malavan	37
2015-16	Sara Ghomi	Malavan	24
2016-17	Zahra Hatamnejad		25
2019-19	Zahra Ghanbari	Bam Khatoon	51
2021-22	Zahra Ghanbari	Bam Khatoon	39
2023-24	Zahra Ghanbari	Bam Khatoon	15
2024-25	Zahra Ghanbari	Bam Khatoon	22
2025-26	Afsaneh Chatrenoor	Gol Gohar Sirjan	15

Most time goalscorers

- 5 times.
  - Sara Ghomi (2009-10, 2011-12, 2013-14, 2014-15 and 2015-16).

Most goals by a player in a single season

- 51 goals.
  - Zahra Ghanbari (2017-18).

== Broadcasting ==
IRIB exclusively broadcasts the matches.

From 2024, the matches were streamed online on several different platforms, and the resulting income went indirectly to the clubs.

== Notes about clubs ==
There are at least three clubs from the Kurdistan region:

- Eesta Alborz (formerly Ista Kurdistan, sometimes spelt Eesta Kordistan, now based in Alborz province)
- Vechan Kurdistan (also spelt Wechan Kurdistan)
- Yasam Kurdistan

== Sponsors ==
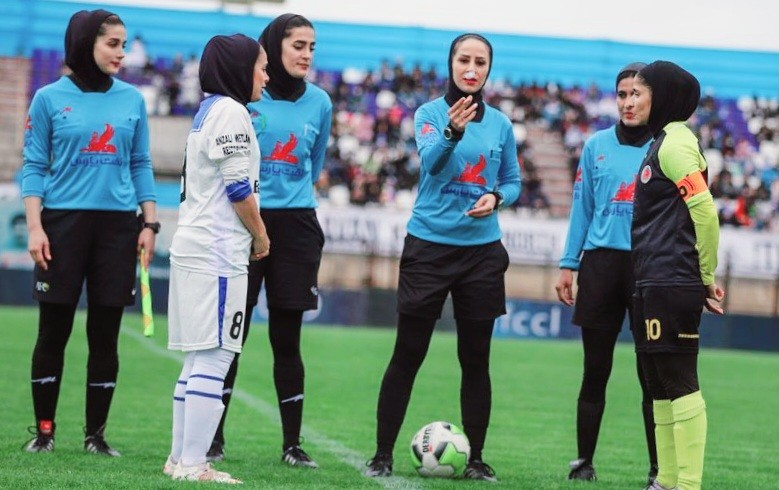
2022-2023 season: Malavan v Bam Khatoon

The non-broadcasting situation of the matches on Iranian television and the problems related to women's sports in Iran after the 1979 revolution caused serious economic problems for the league.

In July 2019, the FFIRI signed a contract with Pars Oil Company for the sponsorship of Iran's football referees, including the (male) Pro League, women referees in the Women's League, and futsal league, and the women received shirts with the company. However, female referees lodged a complaint against unpaid wages, which led to their dismissal, in violation of the Federation's statute. After the chairman of the FFIRI's Referees Committee intervened, all of the women were backpaid, but were then terminated and disqualified.

== See also ==
- AFC Women's Club Championship
- Women's football in Iran
- Iran Football League Organization
