= Shahnaz Jafarizadeh =

Iranian footballer (born 1994)

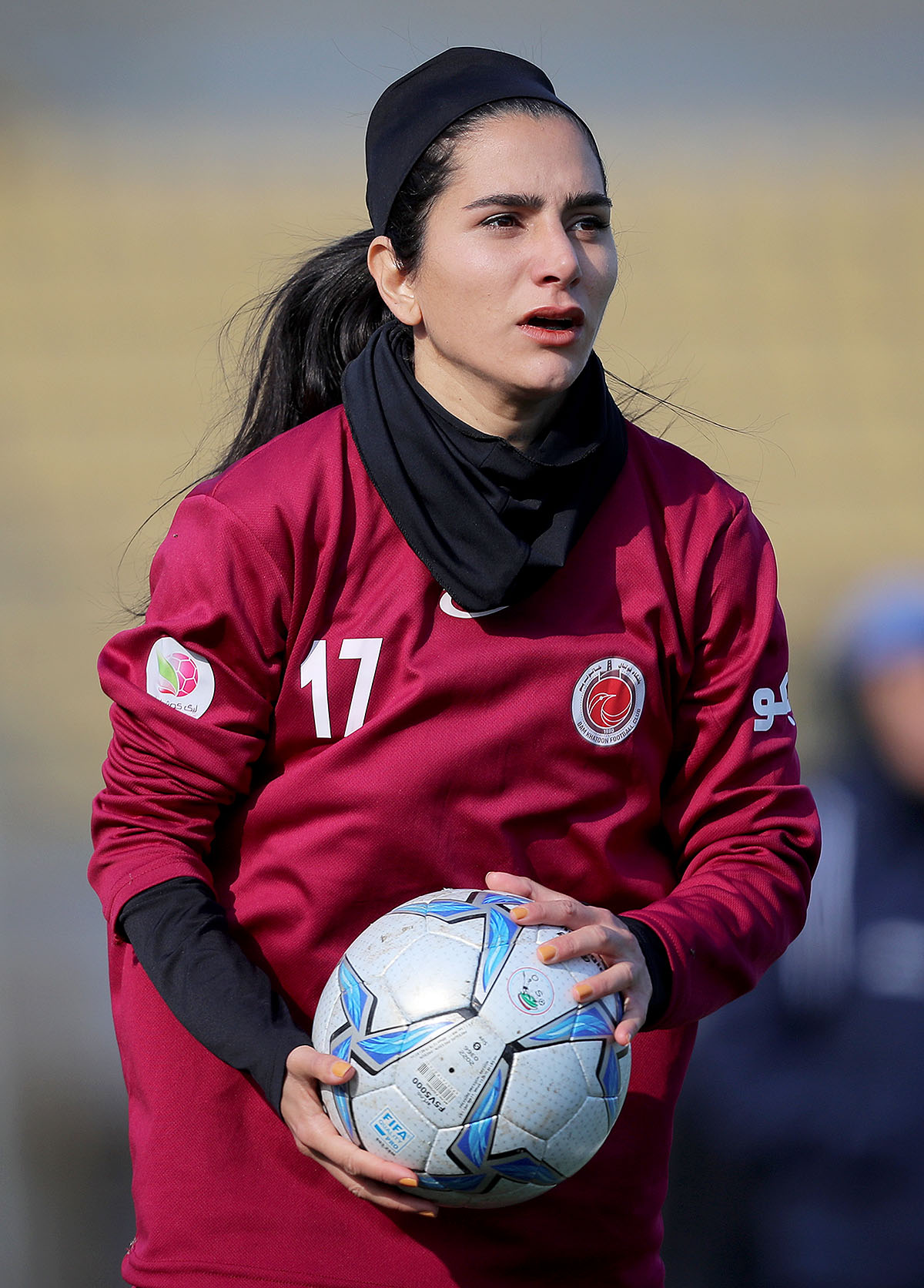

Personal information
- Full name: Shahnaz Jafarizadeh
- Date of birth: 16 March 1994 (age 32)
- Place of birth: Qom, Iran
- Position: Defender

Team information
- Current team: Bam Khatoon F.C
- Number: 17

Senior career*
Years	Team	Apps	(Gls)
2023	Bam Khatoon		

International career
2021	Iran National Team		
- * Club domestic league appearances and goals

Shahnaz Jafarizadeh (Persian: شهناز جعفری‌زاده; born 16 March 1994 in Qom) is an Iranian footballer who plays as a defender for Kowsar Women Football League club Bam Khatoon and the Iran women's national team.
