= Iran women's national football team results =

The following are the Iran women's national football team results in its international matches regardless of being considered FIFA or non-FIFA internationals, divided into matches played before the Iranian Revolution and then after from 2005 onwards including hybrid matches.

== Results: Before the Iranian Revolution ==
| Won |
| Drawn |
| Lost |

=== 1970s ===
| # | Date | Opponent | Result | Score | Venue | Competition |
|---|---|---|---|---|---|---|
| 1 | 09-May-71 | Italy | L | 0–5 | Tehran, Iran | Friendly |

== Results: After the Iranian Revolution ==
| Won |
| Drawn |
| Lost |

=== 2000s ===
| # | Date | Opponent | Result | Score | Venue | Competition |
|---|---|---|---|---|---|---|
| 1 | 23-Sep-05 | Syria | W | 5–0 | Amman, Jordan | 2005 WAFF Championship |
| 2 | 27-Sep-05 | Bahrain | W | 7–0 | Amman, Jordan | 2005 WAFF Championship |
| 3 | 29-Sep-05 | Palestine | W | 7–0 | Amman, Jordan | 2005 WAFF Championship |
| 4 | 01-Oct-05 | Jordan | L | 1–2 | Amman, Jordan | 2005 WAFF Championship |
| 5 | 12-Aug-07 | Jordan | W | 3–2 | Tehran, Iran | Friendly |
| 6 | 14-Aug-07 | Jordan | W | 3–2 | Tehran, Iran | Friendly |
| 7 | 03-Sep-07 | Syria | W | 13–0 | Amman, Jordan | 2007 WAFF Championship |
| 8 | 05-Sep-07 | Lebanon | W | 3–0 | Amman, Jordan | 2007 WAFF Championship |
| 9 | 07-Sep-07 | Jordan | L | 1–2 | Amman, Jordan | 2007 WAFF Championship |
| 10 | 20-Oct-07 | India | L | 1–3 | New Delhi, India | 2008 Asian Cup Qualifier |
| 11 | 27-Oct-07 | India | W | 4–1 | Tehran, Iran | 2008 Asian Cup Qualifier |
| 12 | 24-Mar-08 | Vietnam | L | 1–4 | Ho Chi Minh City, Vietnam | 2008 Asian Cup Qualifier |
| 13 | 26-Mar-08 | Myanmar | L | 1–2 | Ho Chi Minh City, Vietnam | 2008 Asian Cup Qualifier |
| 14 | 28-Mar-08 | Chinese Taipei | W | 3–2 | Ho Chi Minh City, Vietnam | 2008 Asian Cup Qualifier |
| 15 | 06-Jul-09 | Uzbekistan | L | 1–4 | Bangkok, Thailand | 2010 Asian Cup Qualifier |
| 16 | 08-Jul-09 | Thailand | L | 1–8 | Bangkok, Thailand | 2010 Asian Cup Qualifier |

=== 2010s ===
| # | Date | Opponent | Result | Score | Venue | Competition |
|---|---|---|---|---|---|---|
| 17 | 22-Feb-10 | Bahrain | L | 0–1 | Abu Dhabi, United Arab Emirates | 2010 WAFF Championship |
| 18 | 24-Feb-10 | Jordan | L | 0–4 | Abu Dhabi, United Arab Emirates | 2010 WAFF Championship |
| 19 | 08-Mar-11 | Palestine | W | 4–0 | Zarqa, Jordan | 2012 Olympic Games Qualifier |
| 20 | 10-Mar-11 | Jordan | D | 1–1 | Zarqa, Jordan | 2012 Olympic Games Qualifier |
| 21 | 12-Mar-11 | Bahrain | W | 2–0 | Zarqa, Jordan | 2012 Olympic Games Qualifier |
| 22 | 03-Jun-11 | Jordan | L | 0–3 | Amman, Jordan | 2012 Olympic Games Qualifier |
| 23 | 05-Jun-11 | Vietnam | L | 0–3 | Amman, Jordan | 2012 Olympic Games Qualifier |
| 24 | 07-Jun-11 | Thailand | L | 0–3 | Amman, Jordan | 2012 Olympic Games Qualifier |
| 25 | 12-Jun-11 | Uzbekistan | L | 0–3 | Amman, Jordan | 2012 Olympic Games Qualifier |
| 26 | 04-Oct-11 | Lebanon | W | 8–1 | Abu Dhabi, United Arab Emirates | 2011 WAFF Championship |
| 27 | 06-Oct-11 | United Arab Emirates | W | 4–1 | Abu Dhabi, United Arab Emirates | 2011 WAFF Championship |
| 28 | 08-Oct-11 | Syria | W | 4–1 | Abu Dhabi, United Arab Emirates | 2011 WAFF Championship |
| 29 | 10-Oct-11 | Jordan | W | 3–2 | Abu Dhabi, United Arab Emirates | 2011 WAFF Championship |
| 30 | 12-Oct-11 | United Arab Emirates | D | 2–2 | Abu Dhabi, United Arab Emirates | 2011 WAFF Championship |
| 31 | 11-Feb-13 | Jordan | W | 2–1 | Tehran, Iran | Friendly |
| 32 | 13-Feb-13 | Jordan | W | 2–0 | Tehran, Iran | Friendly |
| 33 | 21-May-13 | Philippines | L | 0–6 | Dhaka, Bangladesh | 2014 Asian Cup Qualifier |
| 34 | 23-May-13 | Bangladesh | W | 2–0 | Dhaka, Bangladesh | 2014 Asian Cup Qualifier |
| 35 | 25-May-13 | Thailand | L | 1–5 | Dhaka, Bangladesh | 2014 Asian Cup Qualifier |
| 36 | 08-Feb-15 | Uzbekistan | L | 0–1 | Tehran, Iran | Friendly |
| 37 | 12-Feb-15 | Uzbekistan | D | 0–0 | Tehran, Iran | Friendly |
| 38 | 22-Mar-15 | Laos | W | 5–1 | Taipei, Taiwan | 2016 Olympic Games Qualifier |
| 39 | 24-Mar-15 | Chinese Taipei | L | 0–1 | Taipei, Taiwan | 2016 Olympic Games Qualifier |
| 40 | 21-Oct-16 | Sweden | L | 0–7 | Gothenburg, Sweden | Friendly |
| 41 | 06-Mar-17 | Ukraine | D | 0–0 | Tehran, Iran | Friendly |
| 42 | 08-Mar-17 | Ukraine | L | 1–2 | Tehran, Iran | Friendly |
| 43 | 03-Apr-17 | Myanmar | L | 0–2 | Hanoi, Vietnam | 2018 Asian Cup Qualifier |
| 44 | 05-Apr-17 | Singapore | W | 6–0 | Hanoi, Vietnam | 2018 Asian Cup Qualifier |
| 45 | 09-Apr-17 | Vietnam | L | 1–6 | Hanoi, Vietnam | 2018 Asian Cup Qualifier |
| 46 | 11-Apr-17 | Syria | W | 12–0 | Hanoi, Vietnam | 2018 Asian Cup Qualifier |
| 47 | 08-Nov-18 | Lebanon | W | 8–0 | Chonburi, Thailand | 2020 Olympic Games Qualifier |
| 48 | 13-Nov-18 | Hong Kong | D | 1–1 | Chonburi, Thailand | 2020 Olympic Games Qualifier |
| 49 | 25-Nov-18 | Afghanistan | W | 6–0 | Tashkent, Uzbekistan | 2018 CAFA Women's Championship |
| 50 | 27-Nov-18 | Uzbekistan | L | 1–2 | Tashkent, Uzbekistan | 2018 CAFA Women's Championship |
| 51 | 29-Nov-18 | Tajikistan | W | 4–1 | Tashkent, Uzbekistan | 2018 CAFA Women's Championship |
| 52 | 1-Dec-18 | Kyrgyzstan | W | 5-0 | Tashkent, Uzbekistan | 2018 CAFA Women's Championship |
| 53 | 09-Feb-19 | India | L | 0–1 | Bhubaneswar, India | 2019 Gold Cup |
| 54 | 11-Feb-19 | Myanmar | L | 0–2 | Bhubaneswar, India | 2019 Gold Cup |
| 55 | 13-Feb-19 | Nepal | L | 0–3 | Bhubaneswar, India | 2019 Gold Cup |
| 56 | 02-Mar-19 | Belarus | L | 0–1 | Tehran, Iran | Friendly |
| 57 | 05-Mar-19 | Belarus | L | 1–2 | Tehran, Iran | Friendly |
| 58 | 03-Apr-19 | Philippines | L | 0–2 | Doha, Qatar | 2020 Olympic Games Qualifier |
| 59 | 06-Apr-19 | Palestine | W | 9–0 | Al-Wakrah, Qatar | 2020 Olympic Games Qualifier |
| 60 | 09-Apr-19 | Chinese Taipei | L | 1–4 | Doha, Qatar | 2020 Olympic Games Qualifier |

=== 2020s ===
| # | Date | Opponent | Result | Score | Venue | Competition |
|---|---|---|---|---|---|---|
| 61 | 08-Jun-21 | Belarus | L | 0-6 | Mogilev, Belarus | Friendly |
| 62 | 11-Jun-21 | Uzbekistan | L | 0-5 | Minsk, Belarus | Friendly |
| 63 | 23-Aug-21 | Uzbekistan | L | 0-2 | Tashkent, Uzbekistan | Friendly |
| 64 | 26-Aug-21 | Uzbekistan | D | 1-1 | Tashkent, Uzbekistan | Friendly |
| 65 | 22-Sep-21 | Bangladesh | W | 5–0 | Tashkent, Uzbekistan | 2022 AFC Women's Asian Cup qualification Group G |
| 66 | 25-Sep-21 | Jordan | D | 0-0 | Tashkent, Uzbekistan | 2022 AFC Women's Asian Cup qualification Group G |
| 67 | 20-Jan-22 | India | D | 0-0 | Navi Mumbai, India | 2022 AFC Women's Asian Cup Group A |
| 68 | 23-Jan-22 | China | L | 0-7 | Mumbai, India | 2022 AFC Women's Asian Cup Group A |
| 69 | 26-Jan-22 | Chinese Taipei | L | 0-5 | Navi Mumbai, India | 2022 AFC Women's Asian Cup Group A |
| 70 | 8-Jul-22 | Kyrgyzstan | W | 1–0 | Dushanbe, Tajikistan | 2022 CAFA Women's Championship |
| 71 | 14-Jul-22 | Tajikistan | W | 5–0 | Dushanbe, Tajikistan | 2022 CAFA Women's Championship |
| 72 | 17-Jul-22 | Turkmenistan | W | 4–0 | Dushanbe, Tajikistan | 2022 CAFA Women's Championship |
| 73 | 20-Jul-22 | Uzbekistan | L | 0-1 | Dushanbe, Tajikistan | 2022 CAFA Women's Championship |
| 74 | 12-Nov-22 | Belarus | W | 1-0 | Tehran, Iran | Friendly |
| 75 | 15-Nov-22 | Belarus | D | 1-1 | Tehran, Iran | Friendly |
| 76 | 5-Apr-23 | Myanmar | W | 1-0 | Yangon, Myanmar | 2024 AFC Olympic Qualifiers Round 1 |
| 77 | 8-Apr-23 | Myanmar | D | 1-1 | Yangon, Myanmar | 2024 AFC Olympic Qualifiers Round 1 |
| 78 | 14-Jul-23 | Russia | L | 0-4 | Kazan, Russia | Friendly |
| 79 | 18-Jul-23 | Russia | L | 0-2 | Khimki, Russia | Friendly |
| 80 | 26-Oct-23 | Australia | L | 0-2 | Perth, Australia | 2024 AFC Olympic Qualifiers Round 2 |
| 81 | 29-Oct-23 | Chinese Taipei | D | 0-0 | Perth, Australia | 2024 AFC Olympic Qualifiers Round 2 |
| 82 | 1-Nov-23 | Philippines | L | 0-1 | Perth, Australia | 2024 AFC Olympic Qualifiers Round 2 |
| 83 | 30-May-24 | Belarus | L | 0-3 | Tehran, Iran | Friendly |
| 84 | 2-Jun-24 | Belarus | L | 0-1 | Tehran, Iran | Friendly |
| 85 | 28-Nov-24 | Jordan | D | 0-0 | Amman, Jordan | Friendly |
| 86 | 1-Dec-24 | Jordan | L | 1-2 | Amman, Jordan | Friendly |
| 87 | 23-Feb-25 | Puerto Rico | D | 1-1 | Alanya, Turkey | 2025 Turkish Women's Cup |
| 88 | 26-Feb-25 | Puerto Rico | L | 0-2 | Alanya, Turkey | 2025 Turkish Women's Cup |
| 89 | 10-Jun-25 | Iraq | W | 8–0 | Tehran, Iran | Friendly |
| 90 | 12-Jun-25 | Iraq | W | 7–0 | Tehran, Iran | Friendly |
| 91 | 10-Jul-25 | Singapore | W | 4–0 | Amman, Jordan | 2026 AFC Women's Asian Cup qualification |
| 92 | 13-Jul-25 | Bhutan | W | 7–1 | Amman, Jordan | 2026 AFC Women's Asian Cup qualification |
| 93 | 16-Jul-25 | Lebanon | L | 1–3 | Amman, Jordan | 2026 AFC Women's Asian Cup qualification |
| 94 | 19-Jul-25 | Jordan | W | 2–1 | Amman, Jordan | 2026 AFC Women's Asian Cup qualification |
| 95 | 21-Oct-25 | India | W | 2–0 | Shilong, India | Friendly |
| 96 | 24-Oct-25 | Nepal | W | 3–0 | Shilong, India | Friendly |
| 97 | 29-Nov-25 | Uzbekistan | L | 0–2 | Tashkent, Uzbekistan | Friendly |
| 98 | 2-Dec-25 | Uzbekistan | L | 0–1 | Tashkent, Uzbekistan | Friendly |
| 99 | 2-Mar-26 | South Korea | L | 0–3 | Gold Coast, Australia | 2026 AFC Women's Asian Cup |
| 100 | 5-Mar-26 | Australia | L | 0–4 | Gold Coast, Australia | 2026 AFC Women's Asian Cup |
| 101 | 8-Mar-26 | Philippines | L | 0–2 | Gold Coast, Australia | 2026 AFC Women's Asian Cup |

- Match against Sweden was not official since Sweden made 8 substitutions.
- Malavan F.C. participated at 2010 WAFF Championship instead of Iran national team.
- 2012 Olympic Games Qualifier matches against Jordan, Vietnam, Thailand and Uzbekistan were awarded 3–0 by FIFA.
- Iran won 4-2 over Jordan in penalty shootouts 2022 AFC Women's Asian Cup qualification Group G
- Match result versus India at 2022 AFC Women's Asian Cup was voided since few days later India was forced to withdraw from the competition.

== Results: Hybrid matches ==
| Won |
| Drawn |
| Lost |

| # | Date | Opponent | Result | Score | Venue | Competition |
|---|---|---|---|---|---|---|
| 1 | 29-Apr-06 | (Germany) BSV Al-Dersimspor | D | 2–2 | Tehran, Iran | Friendly |
| 2 | 9-May-11 | Ukraine League XI | L | 2–4 | Tehran, Iran | Friendly |
| 3 | 11-May-11 | Ukraine League XI | D | 2–2 | Tehran, Iran | Friendly |
| 4 | 12-Nov-12 | Iran WU20 | ? | ?–? | Tehran, Iran | Friendly |
| 5 | 21-Feb-15 | Iran WU20 | ? | ?–? | Tehran, Iran | Friendly |
| 6 | 5-Mar-18 | Iran WU20 | L | 0–2 | Tehran, Iran | Friendly |
| 7 | 14-Jul-18 | Iran WU20 | ? | ?–? | Tehran, Iran | Friendly |
| 8 | 29-Jul-18 | Iran WU20 | W | 5–0 | Tehran, Iran | Friendly |
| 9 | 2-Oct-18 | Iran WU20 | W | 5–0 | Tehran, Iran | Friendly |
| 10 | 31-Mar-19 | Iran WU20 | W | 11–0 | Tehran, Iran | Friendly |
| 11 | 26-May-21 | Iran WU20 | W | 2–0 | Tehran, Iran | Friendly |
| 12 | 3-Jun-21 | (Iran) Ardalan Academy | W | 12-0 | Tehran, Iran | Friendly |
| 13 | 24-Jun-21 | (Iran) Isfahan XI | W | 7-0 | Isfahan, Iran | Friendly |
| 14 | 10-Nov-21 | (Iran) Kish Island XI | W | 8-0 | Kish Island, Iran | Friendly |
| 15 | 17-Jun-23 | (Iran) Pishtaz Tehran | W | 9-0 | Tehran, Iran | Friendly |
| 16 | 17-Oct-23 | (Iran) Bam Khatoon F.C. | W | 1-0 | Tehran, Iran | Friendly |
| 17 | 16-May-25 | Iran WU20 | W | 5–1 | Tehran, Iran | Friendly |
