= Maryam Azmoon =

Iranian football coach (born 1973)

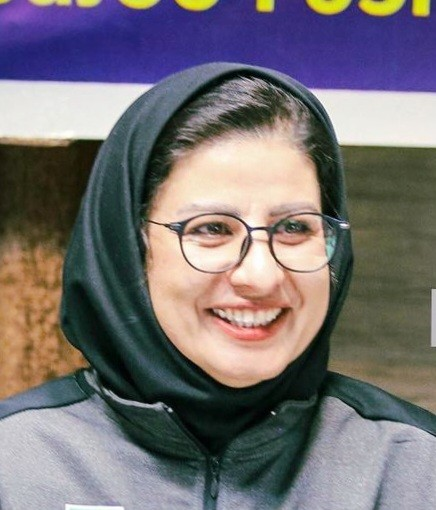

Personal information
- Date of birth: 10 November 1973 (age 53)
- Place of birth: Rasht, Iran

Team information
- Current team: Persepolis F.C.

Managerial career
- Years: Team
- 2016–2020: Iran women
- 2020–2021: Kuwait women
- 2021–2022: Iran women U20
- 2022–2024: Iran women
- 2025–2026: Perspolis F.C.

Maryam Azmoon (born 10 November 1973) is an Iranian football coach and former player. She previously coached Kuwait's women's national football team.

== Career ==
Before becoming a coach, Azmoon was a footballer. From 2013 to 2016, she served as head coach of the Kuwait women's national football team. In 2016 she worked alongside the head coach of Iran's women's national team Helena Costa before becoming head coach of the country's U-20 women's team in 2021.

She held the post for two years before returning to the senior team, with the aims of qualifying for the 2023 FIFA Women's World Cup and 2024 Summer Olympics.

As of 2025 Azmoon is the manager of Perspolis W.F.C. In December 2025, ahead of Persepolis Women's first season in the Iranian Women's Football League, Azmoon highlighted her ambition for the team to compete for the championship, and emphasized the importance of continued development and fan support in achieving results.
