= Iran women's national football team =

Women's national football team representing Iran

Iran
- Nickname(s): Iranian lionesses ("Shirzanan"); Persian ladies
- Association: Football Federation Islamic Republic of Iran (FFIRI)
- Confederation: AFC (Asia)
- Sub-confederation: CAFA (Central Asia)
- Head coach: Marziyeh Jafari
- Captain: Zahra Ghanbari
- Most caps: Sara Ghomi (34)
- Top scorer: Zahra Ghanbari (22)
- Home stadium: Ararat Stadium
- FIFA code: IRN
First colours	Second colours

FIFA ranking
- Current: 67 ▲1 (20 October 2026)
- Highest: 48 (September 2008 – March 2009)
- Lowest: 72 (June – August 2021)

First international
- Iran 0–5 Italy (Tehran, Iran; 9 May 1971) First FIFA International; Iran 5–0 Syria (Amman, Jordan; 23 September 2005)

Biggest win
- Iran 13–0 Syria (Amman, Jordan; 3 September 2007)

Biggest defeat
- Thailand 8–1 Iran (Bangkok, Thailand; 8 July 2009); Sweden 7–0 Iran (Gothenburg, Sweden; 21 October 2016); Iran 0–7 China (Mumbai, India; 23 January 2022)

Asian Cup
- Appearances: 2 (first in 2022)
- Best result: Group stage (2022, 2026)

CAFA Championship
- Appearances: 2 (first in 2018)
- Best result: Runners-up (2018, 2022)
Medal record
Women's football
CAFA Women's Championship
Silver medal – second place	2018 Uzbekistan	Team
Silver medal – second place	2022 Tajikistan	Team
WAFF Women's Championship
Silver medal – second place	2005 Jordan	Team
Silver medal – second place	2007 Jordan	Team
Silver medal – second place	2011 UAE	Team

The Iran women's national football team, nicknamed the Lionesses, represents Iran in international women's football and is governed by the Football Federation Islamic Republic of Iran (FFIRI). The team played its first international match in May 1971 against Italy and its first FIFA-recognised international in September 2005 against Syria.

== History ==
=== Early years: 1969–1979 ===
In 1969, a group of Iranian women attended FIFA coaching classes for women's football in South Korea, Singapore, and India. During their time in those countries they also watched women's football matches. Upon their return home, Iran Football Federation after many meetings decided to kick start women's football in Iran. Soon after, clubs such as Taj, Persepolis, Deyhim, Oghab, and PAS formed women's football teams and a women's football league was established in Tehran. Persepolis women football team was coached by Alan Rogers, assisted by Ali Parvin.

On 7 May 1971, visitors to Tehran, Italy, took to the field and won against Iranian club side Taj S.C 2-0. The goals were scored by Medri and Bertolo. The Italians also missed a penalty kick by Nonni. It was the first time an Iranian women's team faced a foreign opponent. Two days later there was the second match which was between Iran women's national football team and Italy, with the Azzurre scoring five goals. Nonni, Gerwien, who scored a brace, Pesenti and Gualdi scored.

Both matches were organisedby Pari Abasalti, editor-in-chief of Ettelaat-e Banuvan magazine, who was also the president of Iran's Damsels and Ladies Association. The venue was Amjadieh stadium in Tehran. Iran women's national team comprised players selected from Taj, Persepolis, Deyhim, Oghab, and PAS. Some of the players who played were Hengameh Afshar, Goli Rahani, and Effat Mohammadi. The team's head coach was Aziz Asli.

Women's football was abandoned after the 1979 Iranian Revolution.

=== Re-establishment in 2004 ===
Refounded in 2004, the team reached second place at the 2005 West Asian Football Federation Women's Championship in Amman, Jordan held in September and October 2005.

In May 2006, the women's team hosted their first foreign visitors when a club from Berlin, Germany called BSV Al-Dersimspor played out a 2–2 draw in Ararat Stadium in Tehran.

The team won second place again at the 2007 and 2011 West Asian Football Federation Women's Championship.

=== 2010s ===
Iran were briefly banned by FIFA from international competition in 2011 for wearing hijabs. This caused Iran to forfeit its bid to qualify for the 2012 Summer Olympics. The ban was lifted in 2012.

In 2015 an official claimed that eight players on the team were males awaiting sex change operations. The claims arose from random gender checks introduced in 2014 after it had been revealed that four of the players were either men who had not completed sex change operations, or were women suffering from sexual development disorders. The FIFA-appointed doctor in Iran denied the claim, saying that all of the women had been checked.

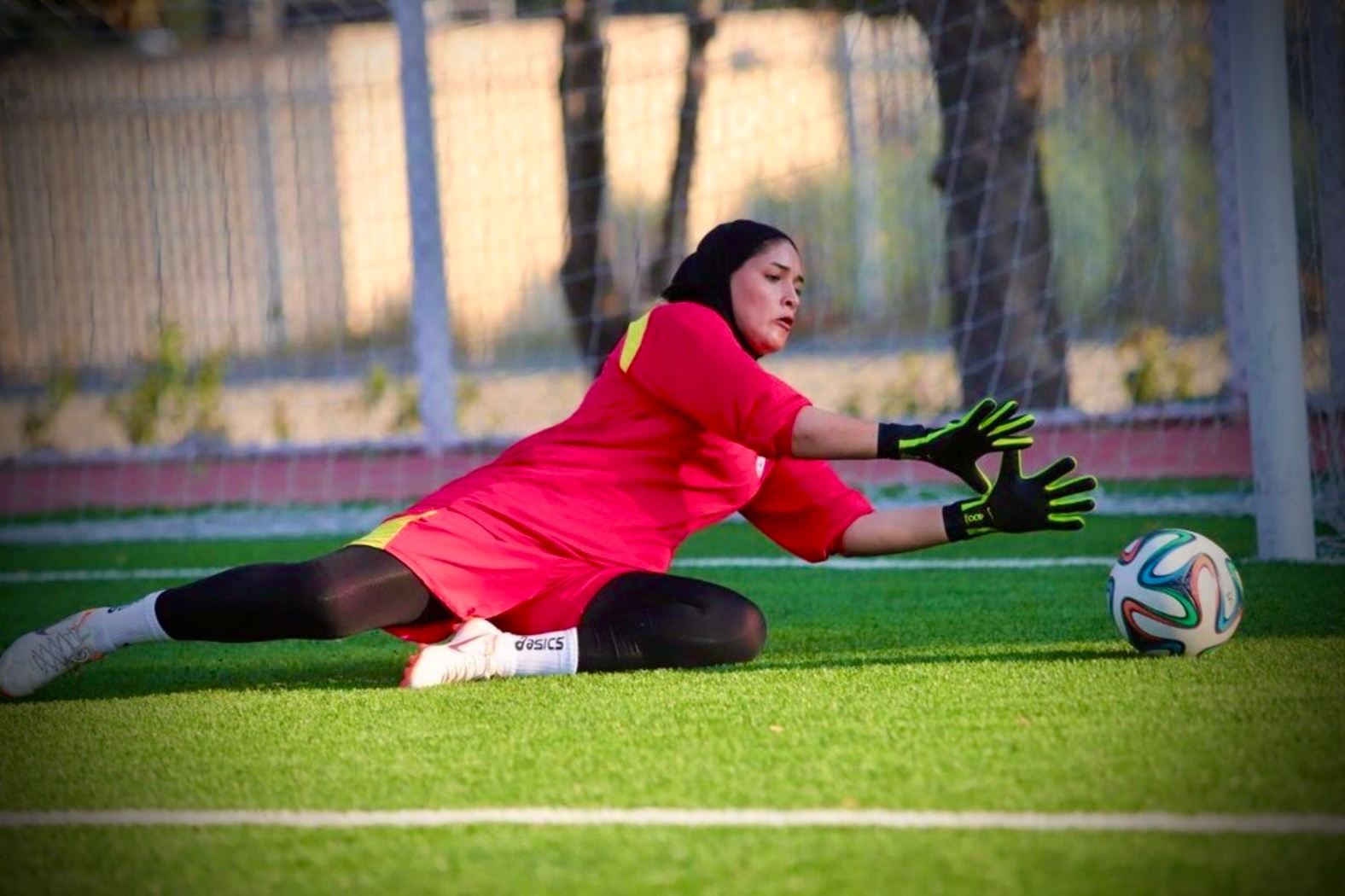
Zahra Khajavi, an important goalkeeper in the team history

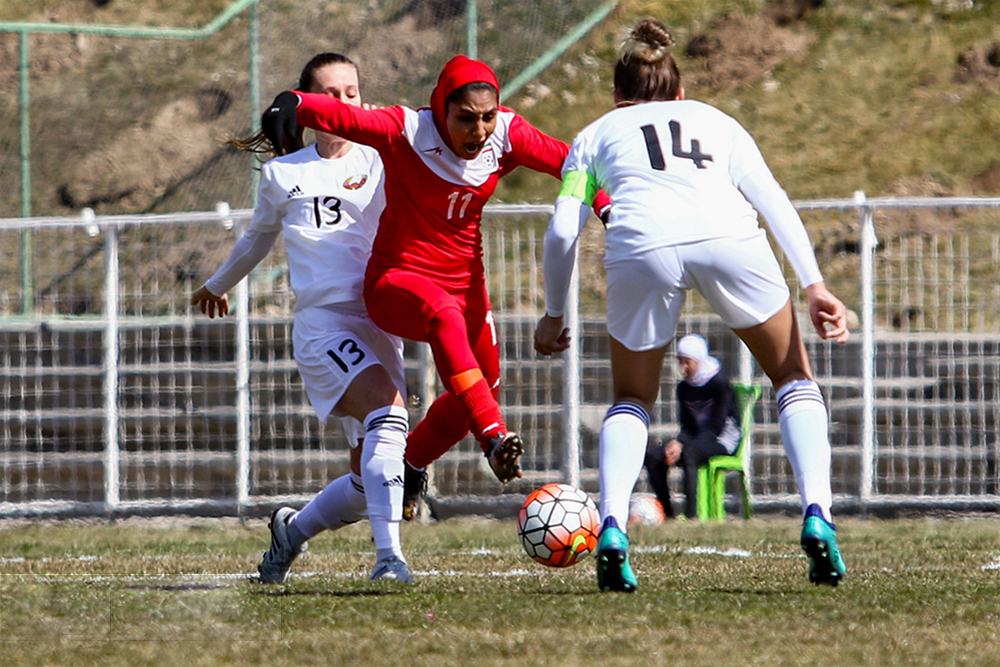
Iran vs Belarus friendly in 2019

On 27 December 2019, Zahra Khajavi broke the clean sheet record of Iranian football by not conceding any goal for 953 minutes. Also, she, along with Alireza Biranvand, are known as the record holders of the longest hand throws in Iranian football. As one of the best goalkeepers in the history of Iranian football, Khajavi was able to once again draw the attention of the domestic media to the Iranian women's national football team. Her achievements played a key role in the progress of the women's national football team in these years.

=== 2020s ===
In the 2020s, women's football became more popular among young Iranians, both boys and girls.

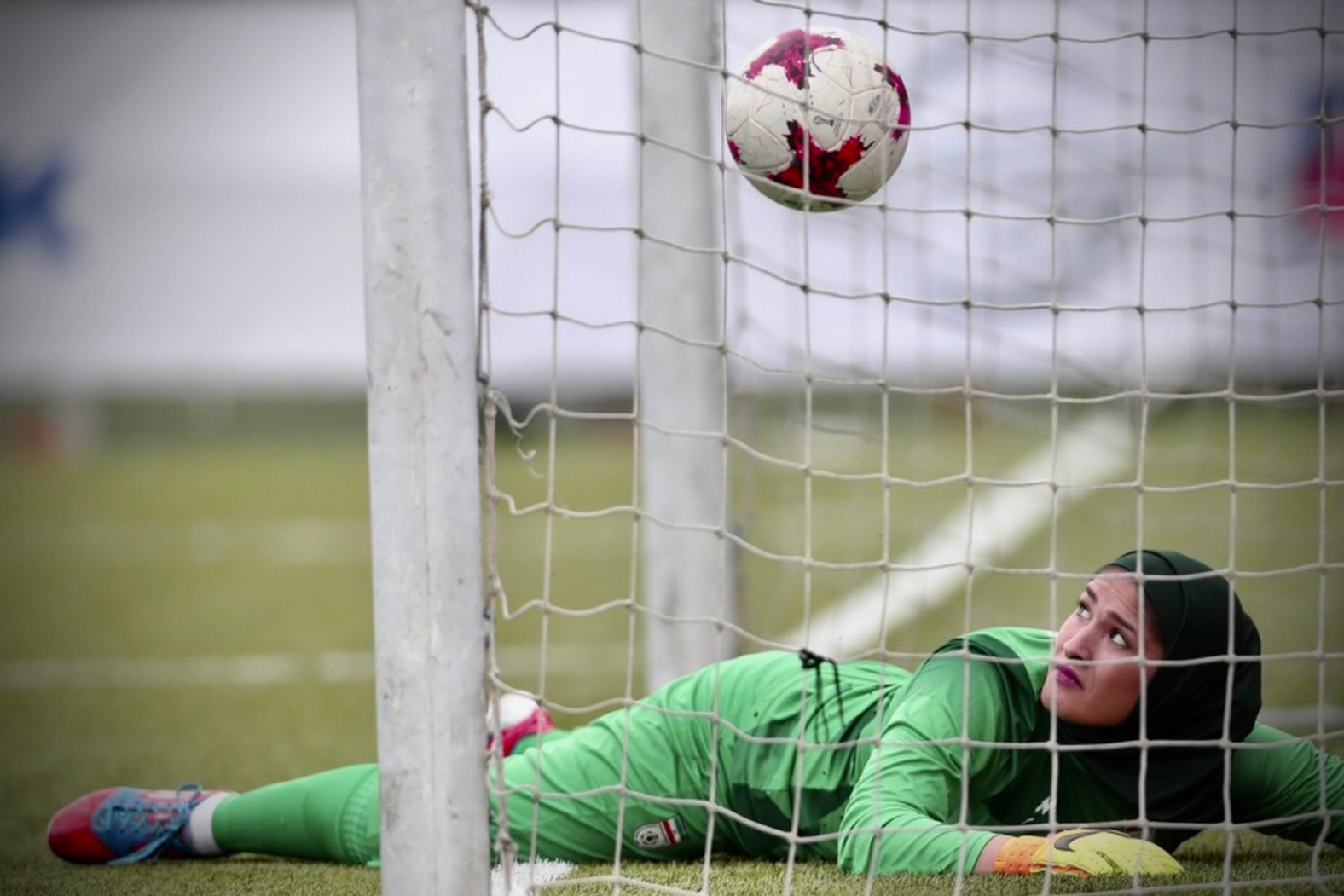
Khajavi playing for Iran in 2022

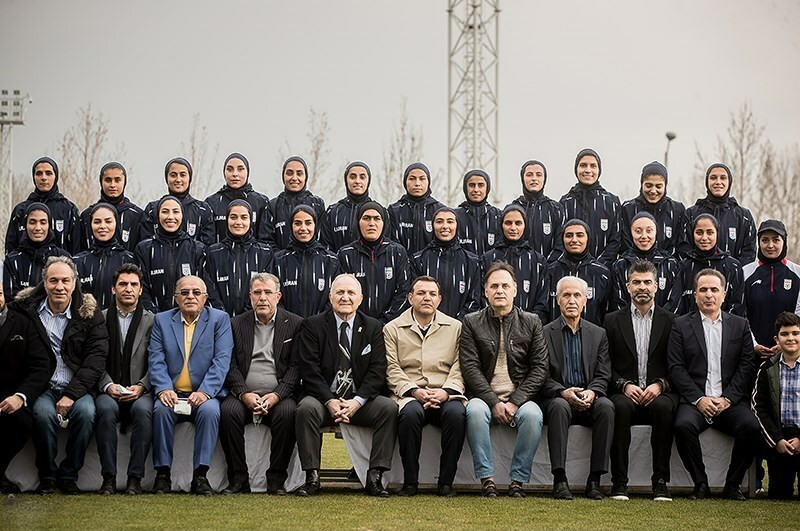
Iran national football team before the 2022 AFC Women's Asian Cup

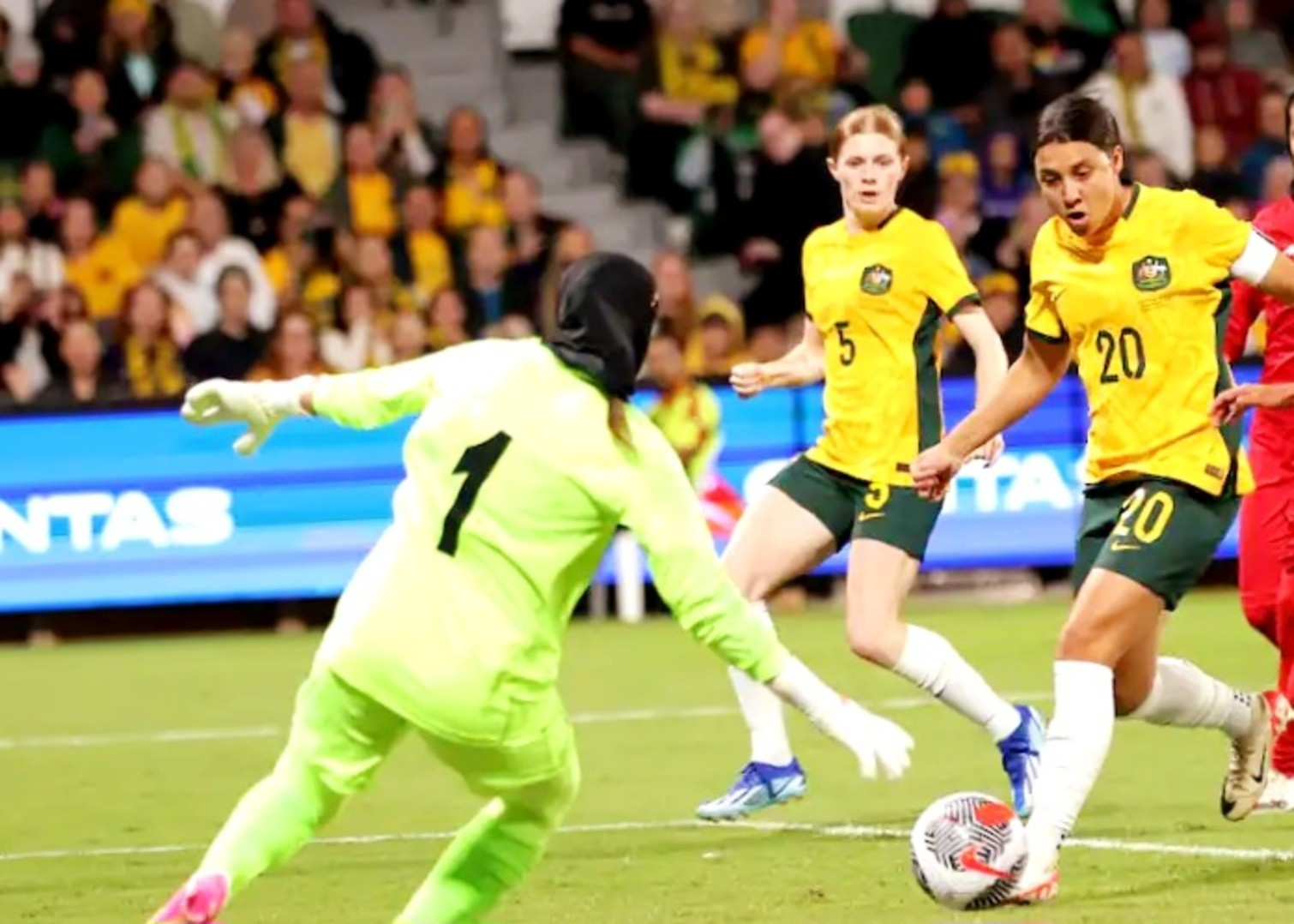
Iran against Australia, 2023

Iran qualified for their first ever AFC Women's Asian Cup when they won against Jordan on penalties in the qualifiers for the 2022 edition to be hosted in India. In Iran's debut, the team held India goalless, but following India's withdrawal due to the COVID-19 pandemic, Iran's only point was lost, and thus Iran was left vulnerable to China and Chinese Taipei, losing 0–7 and 0–5 in process, and was eliminated as the worst third-placed team.

In 2023, a report on BBC Persian reported the lack of facilities and friendly matches for the team. This report suggested that the Iranian Football Federation was unwilling to have a women's team. In the 2024 AFC Women's Olympic Qualifying Tournament, Maryam Azmoon's team had one draw and two defeats (in the second round of the tournament). Their loss against powerful Australia was predictable for the fans.

==== 2025–2026 protests and defections in Australia ====
Following the 2025–2026 Iranian protests and the large-scale crackdown in which thousands of protesters were killed, a number of players resigned from the national team in solidarity with the protesters. The Football Federation Islamic Republic of Iran reportedly threatened resigning players with multi-year bans from professional football, judicial action, and prison sentences.

During the 2026 AFC Women's Asian Cup in Australia, members of the squad refused to sing the national anthem before their opening match against South Korea on 2 March 2026, in an act widely interpreted as solidarity with the ongoing protests and victims of the crackdown in Iran. Iranian state television subsequently labelled the players "wartime traitors", with one broadcaster stating the designation was punishable by death. In their subsequent matches, the players were seen singing the anthem, after reports emerged of threats from security officials accompanying the delegation.

Following the team's elimination from the tournament, five players — Fatemeh Pasandideh, Zahra Ghanbari, Zahra Sarbali, Atefeh Ramezanizadeh and Mona Hamoudi — accepted humanitarian visas from the Australian Government on 9 March 2026 and were taken to a safe location. Player Mohaddeseh Zolifi and staff member Zahra Soltan Meshkeh Kar also initially chose to remain, though one of the two subsequently returned to Iran with the rest of the squad. As the team's bus departed the hotel, it was briefly blocked by protesters chanting "Save our girls!".

Australian Home Affairs Minister Tony Burke confirmed that six players ultimately received permanent humanitarian visas to remain in Australia. FFIRI president Mehdi Taj accused Australian authorities of kidnapping the players and stated the episode cast further doubt on Iran's participation in the 2026 FIFA World Cup. However on Saturday March 14th, three members of the football team, players Mona Hamoudi, Zahra Sarbali and a team support staff member returned to Iran after attempting to seek asylum.

Two of the Iranian women's football team that found asylum in Australia, Fatemeh Pasandideh and Atefeh Ramezanisadeh, made their first public appearance on Tuesday, March 17, while practicing with a professional team in Brisbane.

== Team image ==
=== Nicknames ===
The Iran women's national football team have been known or nicknamed as the "Iranian Lionesses" (in Persian: Shirzanan). The team has been widely nicknamed the Persian stars since 2010. "Persian ladies" are the other nickname of the team in Asian football.

=== Media coverage and promotion ===
In the decades after 1979, the media coverage of women's football in Iran had problems, but the matches of the women's national team are usually followed by Iranian men and women in the national and foreign media.

Persian-language documentaries and sports programs are made about the team's winning potential and history.

=== Kits and crest ===
==== Kit suppliers ====
The table below lists the kit supplier for the Iranian national football team.

Kit supplier	Period	Notes
(Germany) Uhlsport	2019–2022	
(Iran) Merooj	2022–present	

=== Home stadium ===
Iran plays their home matches at the Ararat Stadium.

=== Attendance of women in football matches ===
On 9 November 2018 Fatma Samoura, Secretary General of International Federation of Football Association FIFA said she would ask Iranian government to end ban on women’s entry to sport stadiums.

In September 2019, it was reported that Iranian female football fan Sahar Khodayari, dubbed the "blue girl", died after self-immolating in front of a court in Tehran when she found out she could face a two year sentence for attempting to enter a football stadium to watch her favourite team play.

== Results and fixtures ==
The following is a list of matches in the last 12 months, as well as any future matches that have been scheduled.

Legend

Win Draw Lose Fixture

=== 2025 ===
29 November Friendly	Uzbekistan	2–0	Iran	Tashkent, Uzbekistan
20:00 5:00

2 December Friendly	Uzbekistan	1–0	Iran	Tashkent, Uzbekistan
14:00 +5:00

=== 2026 ===
March 2 AFC Women's Asian Cup GS	South Korea	3–0	Iran	Gold Coast, Australia
19:00 UTC+10	Choe Yu-ri 37'; Kim Hye-ri 59' (pen.); Ko Yoo-jin 75'	Report (AFC); Report (FIFA)		Stadium: Gold Coast Stadium; Referee: Veronika Bernatskaia (Kyrgyzstan)

March 5 AFC Women's Asian Cup GS	Iran	0–4	Australia	Gold Coast, Australia
				Stadium: Gold Coast Stadium

March 8 AFC Women's Asian Cup GS	Iran	0–2	Philippines	Gold Coast, Australia
		Report (AFC); Report (FIFA)	Eggesvik 29'; McDaniel 82'	Stadium: Gold Coast Stadium; Attendance: 2,384; Referee: Tian Jin (China)

- Fixtures and Results (Iran)– Soccerway.com

== Head-to-head record ==
As of 2 March 2026, after the match against South Korea.

Team	Pld	W	D	L	GF	GA	GD	Confederation
Afghanistan	1	1	0	0	6	0	+6	AFC
Australia	1	0	0	1	0	2	-2	AFC
Bangladesh	2	2	0	0	12	0	+12	AFC
Bahrain	3	2	0	1	9	1	+8	AFC
Bhutan	1	1	0	0	7	1	+6	AFC
Belarus	7	1	1	5	3	14	−11	UEFA
China	1	0	0	1	0	7	−7	AFC
Chinese Taipei	5	1	1	3	4	12	−8	AFC
Hong Kong	1	0	1	0	1	1	0	AFC
India	5	2	1	2	7	5	+2	AFC
Iraq	2	2	0	0	15	0	+15	AFC
Italy	1	0	0	1	0	5	−5	UEFA
Jordan	14	6	3	5	19	22	-3	AFC
Kyrgyzstan	2	2	0	0	6	0	+6	AFC
Laos	1	1	0	0	5	1	+4	AFC
Lebanon	4	3	0	1	20	4	+16	AFC
Myanmar	5	1	1	3	3	7	−4	AFC
Nepal	2	1	0	1	3	3	0	AFC
Palestine	3	3	0	0	20	0	+20	AFC
Philippines	3	0	0	3	0	9	−9	AFC
Puerto Rico	2	0	1	1	1	3	−2	CONCACAF
Russia	2	0	0	2	0	6	−6	UEFA
Singapore	2	2	0	0	10	0	+10	AFC
South Korea	1	0	0	1	0	3	−3	AFC
Sweden	1	0	0	1	0	7	−7	UEFA
Syria	4	4	0	0	34	1	+33	AFC
Thailand	3	0	0	3	2	16	−14	AFC
Tajikistan	2	2	0	0	9	1	+8	AFC
Turkmenistan	1	1	0	0	4	0	+4	AFC
United Arab Emirates	2	1	1	0	6	3	+3	AFC
Ukraine	2	0	1	1	1	2	−1	UEFA
Uzbekistan	11	0	2	9	3	22	−19	AFC
Vietnam	3	0	0	3	2	13	−11	AFC
Total	99	39	13	47	212	168	+44	

== Coaching staff ==
=== Current coaching staff ===
As of 21 July 2025

Position	Name	Ref.
Head coach	(Iran) Marziyeh Jafari	
Assistant coaches	(Iran) Sara Ghomi (Iran) Parvaneh Karan Khosravi	
Goalkeeping coach	(Iran) Mahdiyeh Molaei	
Sport medical personnel	(Iran) Sanaz Kabiri (Iran) Mahdieh Mirmohammadkhani	
Physiotherapist	(Iran) Zeynab Hosseinzadeh	
Analyst	(Iran) Houtan Negari	
Goalkeeping consultant	(Iran) Mohammad Habibi	
Physical training consultant	(Iran) Mohammad Reza Molaei	
Technical manager	(Iran) Hossein Abdi	
Supervisor	(Iran) Fatemeh Boudaghi	

=== Manager history ===
- (Iran) Aziz Asli (1971)
- (Iran) Shahrzad Mozafar (2005)
- (China) Zhu Fang Shin (2008)
- (Iran) Maryam Irandoost (2010–2012)
- (Portugal) Helena Costa (2012–2014)
- (Iran) Mahnaz Amirshaghaghi (2014–2016)
- (Iran) Maryam Azmoon (2016–2020)
- (Iran) Maryam Irandoost (2021–2022)
- (Iran) Maryam Azmoon (2022–2025)
- (Iran) Marziyeh Jafari (2025–)

== Players ==
=== 2025 squad ===
The following players were called up for two friendly matches to be held in Tashkent, Uzbekistan in November 2025.**

No.	Pos.	Player	Date of birth (age)	Club
	GK	Raha Yazdani	1 July 1987 (age 39)	(Football Federation Islamic Republic of Iran) Bam Khatoon
	GK	Mahnaz Rezazadeh	28 November 1999 (age 26)	(Football Federation Islamic Republic of Iran) Tam Isfahan
	GK	Maryam Yektaei	19 June 1993 (age 33)	(Turkish Football Federation) Beylerbeyi SK
	DF	Atefeh Imani	28 July 1996 (age 30)	(Football Federation Islamic Republic of Iran) Sangin Mashin Ista
	DF	Zeinab Abbaspour	24 January 2003 (age 23)	(Football Federation Islamic Republic of Iran) Persepolis
	DF	Sana Sadeghi	12 June 2000 (age 26)	(Football Federation Islamic Republic of Iran) Persepolis
	DF	Zahra Ahmadzadeh	4 June 1997 (age 29)	(Football Federation Islamic Republic of Iran) Persepolis
	DF	Fatemeh Amineh	3 June 1997 (age 29)	(Football Federation Islamic Republic of Iran) Bam Khatoon
	DF	Fatemeh Makhdoumi	14 February 2001 (age 25)	(Football Federation Islamic Republic of Iran) Sangin Machin Ista
	DF	Zahra Pourheidar	15 April 1994 (age 32)	(Football Federation Islamic Republic of Iran) Sepahan
	DF	Behnaz Taherkhani	22 May 1995 (age 31)	(Football Federation Islamic Republic of Iran) Malavan
	MF	Shabnam Behesht	30 November 1998 (age 27)	(Football Federation Islamic Republic of Iran) Gol Gohar Sirjan
	MF	Hasti Foroozandeh	6 March 2004 (age 22)	(Football Federation Islamic Republic of Iran) Sangin Mashin Ista
	MF	Mohaddeseh Zolfi	16 January 2005 (age 21)	(Football Federation Islamic Republic of Iran) Sangin Mashin Ista
	MF	Fatemeh Shaban	4 November 2002 (age 24)	(Football Federation Islamic Republic of Iran) Sangin Mashin Ista
	MF	Zahra Alizadehkaryak	7 December 2000 (age 25)	(Football Federation Islamic Republic of Iran) Gol Gohar Sirjan
	MF	Shaghayegh Rouzbahan	6 December 1994 (age 31)	(Football Federation Islamic Republic of Iran) Sangin Mashin Ista
	FW	Fahimeh Arzani	4 April 2004 (age 22)	(Football Federation Islamic Republic of Iran) Malavan
	FW	Parnia Rahmani	19 June 1993 (age 33)	(Football Federation Islamic Republic of Iran) Gol Gohar Sirjan
	FW	Somayyeh Esmaeili	28 November 2003 (age 22)	(Football Federation Islamic Republic of Iran) Palayesh Gaz Ilam
	FW	Fatemeh Rezaei	28 August 2000 (age 26)	(Football Federation Islamic Republic of Iran) Persepolis
	FW	Golnoosh Khosravi	12 May 2001 (age 25)	(Football Federation Islamic Republic of Iran) Gol Gohar Sirjan

**On 9 March 2026, Zahra Sarbali, Fatemeh Pasandideh, Atefeh Ramezanizadeh, and Mona Hamoudi, and captain and top-goalscorer Zahra Ghanbari, as members of the team at the 2026 AFC Women's Asian Cup tournament in Australia, left the team's training camp in Australia and sought refuge due to fears of retaliation from Iranian authorities. The team had refused to sing the national anthem at the first game of the tournament, shortly after the beginning of the 2026 Iran war. They were granted asylum on humanitarian visas in Australia.

=== Recent call-ups ===
The following players have been called up to the squad in the past year.

Pos.	Player	Date of birth (age)	Caps	Goals	Club	Latest call-up
GK	Zahra Khajavi	8 February 1999 (age 27)	-	-	(Iran) Sangin Machin Ista	v. Uzbekistan, 2025
GK	Mina Nafeei Kouhi	25 February 1999 (age 27)	-	-	(Iran) Gol Gohar Sirjan	v. Nepal, 2025
GK	Atena Tofigh	26 February 2006 (age 20)	-	-	(Iran) Persepolis	v. Nepal, 2025
DF	Atefeh Ramezanizadeh	21 April 1992 (age 34)	-	-	(Iran) Bam Khatoon	v. Nepal, 2025
DF	Melika Motevalli Taher	6 May 1998 (age 28)	-	-	(Iran) Bam Khatoon	v. Nepal, 2025
MF	Zahra Ghanbari (captain)	4 March 1992 (age 34)	-	-	(Iran) Sangin Mashin Ista	v. Uzbekistan, 2025
MF	Mona Hamoudi	11 November 1993 (age 33)	5	2	(Iran) Bam Khatoon	v. Iraq, 2025
MF	Fatemeh Gerayli	30 January 1999 (age 27)	-	-	(Iran) Bam Khatoon	v. Iraq, 2025
MF	Zahra Sarbali Alishah	13 August 1993 (age 33)	-	-	(Iran) Gol Gohar Sirjan	v. Nepal, 2025
MF	Fatemeh Pasandideh	8 April 2004 (age 22)	-	-	(Iran) Bam Khatoon	v. Nepal, 2025
FW	Afsaneh Chatrenoor	14 April 1998 (age 28)	-	-	(Iran) Gol Gohar Sirjan	v. Nepal, 2025
FW	Negin Zandi Dareh Gharibi	20 January 2004 (age 22)	-	-	(Iran) Bam Khatoon	v. Nepal, 2025
FW	Roujin Tamarian	29 December 2005 (age 20)	-	-	(Iran) Bam Khatoon	v. Nepal, 2025
FW	Maryam Dini	12 March 2007 (age 19)	-	-	(Iran) Bam Khatoon	v. Nepal, 2025
FW	Sara Didar	27 November 2004 (age 21)	-	-	(Iran) Bam Khatoon	v. Nepal, 2025

=== Current foreign-based players available for selection for national team ===
No.	Pos.	Player	Date of birth (age)	Caps	Goals	Club
	GK	Parisa Geravandi	26 January 1996 (age 30)	0	0	(Turkish Football Federation) Ataşehir Belediyespor
	GK	Maryam Yektaei	19 June 1993 (age 33)	6	0	(Turkish Football Federation) BEYLERBEYI SPOR KULÜBÜ SPOR FAALIYETLERI A.S
	DF	Faezeh Esfahanian	18 December 1998 (age 27)	0	0	(Turkish Football Federation) Bağcılar Evren Spor
	DF	Sara Valad Khani	14 August 1999 (age 27)	0	0	(German Football Association) FC Bergedorf 85
	MF	Hananeh Aminghashghay	14 July 2003 (age 23)	0	0	(Turkish Football Federation) Altay
	MF	Masha Mehri	1 January 1986 (age 40)	0	0	(Austrian Football Association) ASKÖ Ebelsberg Linz
	MF	Yasaman Farmani	12 February 1995 (age 31)	6	0	(Polish Football Association) Lech Poznań
	MF	Annahita Zamanian	19 February 1998 (age 28)	0	0	(Italian Football Federation) Sassuolo
	MF	Lily Nabet	24 September 1999 (age 27)	0	0	(United States Soccer Federation) Angel City
	FW	Shiva Alicia Fannipour	28 October 1998 (age 28)	0	0	(German Football Association) FC Bergedorf 85
	FW	Dajan Hashemi	21 November 2000 (age 25)	4	0	(Danish Football Association) Brøndby

=== Players of Iranian heritage in other national teams ===
Unfortunately, due to strict FIFA rules, Iran women's team is unable to acquire experienced footballers who have many caps for other national teams. Two players of Iranian heritage in other national teams are Sara Doorsoun ( Germany), and Natasha Shirazi ( Uganda).

=== Players from Iranian diaspora ===
The following players from Iranian diaspora (dual citizens) capped for Iran national team, the flag next to them shows their citizenship:

- (United States) Katayoun Khosrowyar
- (United States) Melika Mohammadi

Several others such as the following never capped for the national team despite having capped for Iran's youth national team:

- (United States) Sofia Askari
- (United States) Kimya Raietparvar Taloukie
- (United States) Vida Raietparvar Taloukie

== Honours ==
=== Regional ===
- WAFF Women's Championship

Runners-up: 2005, 2007, 2011

- CAFA Women's Championship

Runners-up: 2018, 2022

== Competitive record ==
=== FIFA Women's World Cup ===
FIFA Women's World Cup record										Qualification record						
Year	Result	Position	GP	W	D	L	GF	GA	GD	GP	W	D	L	GF	GA	GD
(China) 1991 to (United States) 2003	Did not exist									Did not exist						
(China) 2007	Did not enter									Did not enter						
(Germany) 2011	Did not qualify									Via AFC Women's Asian Cup						
(Canada) 2015	Did not qualify									Via AFC Women's Asian Cup						
(France) 2019	Did not qualify									Via AFC Women's Asian Cup						
(Australia) (New Zealand) 2023	Did not qualify									Via AFC Women's Asian Cup						
(Brazil) 2027	Did not qualify									Via AFC Women's Asian Cup						
(Costa Rica) (Jamaica) (Mexico) (United States) 2031	To be determined									To be determined						
(United Kingdom) 2035	To be determined									To be determined						
Total:0/9	–	–	–	–	–	–	–	–	–	–	–	–	–	–	–	–

=== Olympic Games ===
Summer Olympics record									Qualification record						
Year	Round	GP	W	D*	L	GF	GA	GD	GP	W	D*	L	GF	GA	GD
(United States) 1996 to (Greece) 2004	Did not exist								Did not exist						
(China) 2008	Did not enter								Did not enter						
(United Kingdom) 2012	Did not qualify								7 (Note: The Iranian government refused to allow its female players to remove the hijab when playing, in violation of FIFA policy; Jordan, Vietnam, Thailand and Uzbekistan were awarded the respective matches 3–0.)	2	1	4	7	13	−6
(Brazil) 2016	Did not qualify								2	1	0	1	5	2	+3
(Japan) 2020	Did not qualify								5	2	1	2	19	7	+12
(France) 2024	Did not qualify								5	1	2	2	2	4	−2
(United States) 2028	To be determined								To be determined						
(Australia) 2032	To be determined								To be determined						
Total:0/8	–	–	–	–	–	–	–	–	19	6	4	9	33	26	+7

Notes:

*Draws include knockout matches decided on penalty kicks.

=== AFC Women's Asian Cup ===
AFC Women's Asian Cup									Qualification record						
Year	Result	GP	W	D*	L	GF	GA	GD	GP	W	D*	L	GF	GA	GD
(Hong Kong) 1975 to (Thailand) 2003	Did not exist								Did not exist						
(Australia) 2006	Did not enter								Did not enter						
(Vietnam) 2008	Did not qualify								5	2	0	3	10	12	−2
(China) 2010	Did not qualify								2	0	0	2	2	10	−10
(Vietnam) 2014	Did not qualify								3	1	0	2	3	11	−8
(Jordan) 2018	Did not qualify								4	2	0	2	19	8	+11
(India) 2022	Group stage	2	0	0	2	0	12	−12	2	1	1	0	5	0	+5
(Australia) 2026	Group stage	3	0	0	3	0	9	−9	4	3	0	1	14	5	+9
(Uzbekistan) 2029	To be determined								To be determined						
Total	2/21	5	0	0	5	0	21	−21	20	9	1	10	53	46	+7

*Draws include knockout matches decided on penalty kicks.

=== Asian Games ===
Asian Games record
Year	Result	GP	W	D*	L	GF	GA	GD
(China) 1990 to (South Korea) 2002	Did not exist							
(Qatar) 2006 to (China) 2022	Did not enter							
(Japan) 2026	To be determined							
(Qatar) 2030	To be determined							
(Saudi Arabia) 2034	To be determined							
Total	0/9	–	–	–	–	–	–	–

*Draws include knockout matches decided on penalty kicks.

=== WAFF Women's Championship ===
WAFF Women's Championship record
Year	Round	Pld	W	D*	L	GS	GA
(Jordan) 2005	Runners-up	4	3	0	1	20	2
(Jordan) 2007	Runners-up	3	2	0	1	17	2
(United Arab Emirates) 2010	Group stage	2	0	0	2	0	5
(United Arab Emirates) 2011	Runners-up	5	4	1	0	21	7
(Jordan) 2014	Did not enter						
2019–onward	Not WAFF member						
Total	4/7	14	9	1	4	58	16

*Draws include knockout matches decided on penalty kicks.

Malavan F.C. participated at the 2010.

=== CAFA Women's Championship ===
CAFA Women's Championship record
Year	Round	Pld	W	D*	L	GS	GA
(Uzbekistan) 2018	Runners-up	4	3	0	1	16	3
(Tajikistan) 2022	Runners-up	4	3	0	1	10	1
Total	2/2	8	6	0	2	26	4

*Draws include knockout matches decided on penalty kicks.

Iran U-23 team participated at the 2018 edition.

== FIFA World Ranking ==
As of 26 January 2022, after the match against Chinese Taipei.

Best Ranking Best Mover Worst Ranking Worst Mover

Iran's FIFA World Ranking History
Rank	Year	Games Played	Won	Lost	Drawn	Best		Worst	
Rank	Year	Games Played	Won	Lost	Drawn	Rank	Move	Rank	Move
67 ▲1 (20 October 2026)	2022	2	0	0	2	70	0	70	0
70	2021	0	0	0	0	70	▲0	70	0

== See also ==
- Sport in Iran
  - Football in Iran
    - Women's football in Iran
- Football Federation Islamic Republic of Iran (IFF)
- Iran women's national football team
  - Iran women's national football team results
  - List of Iran women's international footballers
- Iran women's national under-20 football team
- Iran women's national under-17 football team
- Iran women's national futsal team
- Iran men's national football team
