= Women's football in Iran =

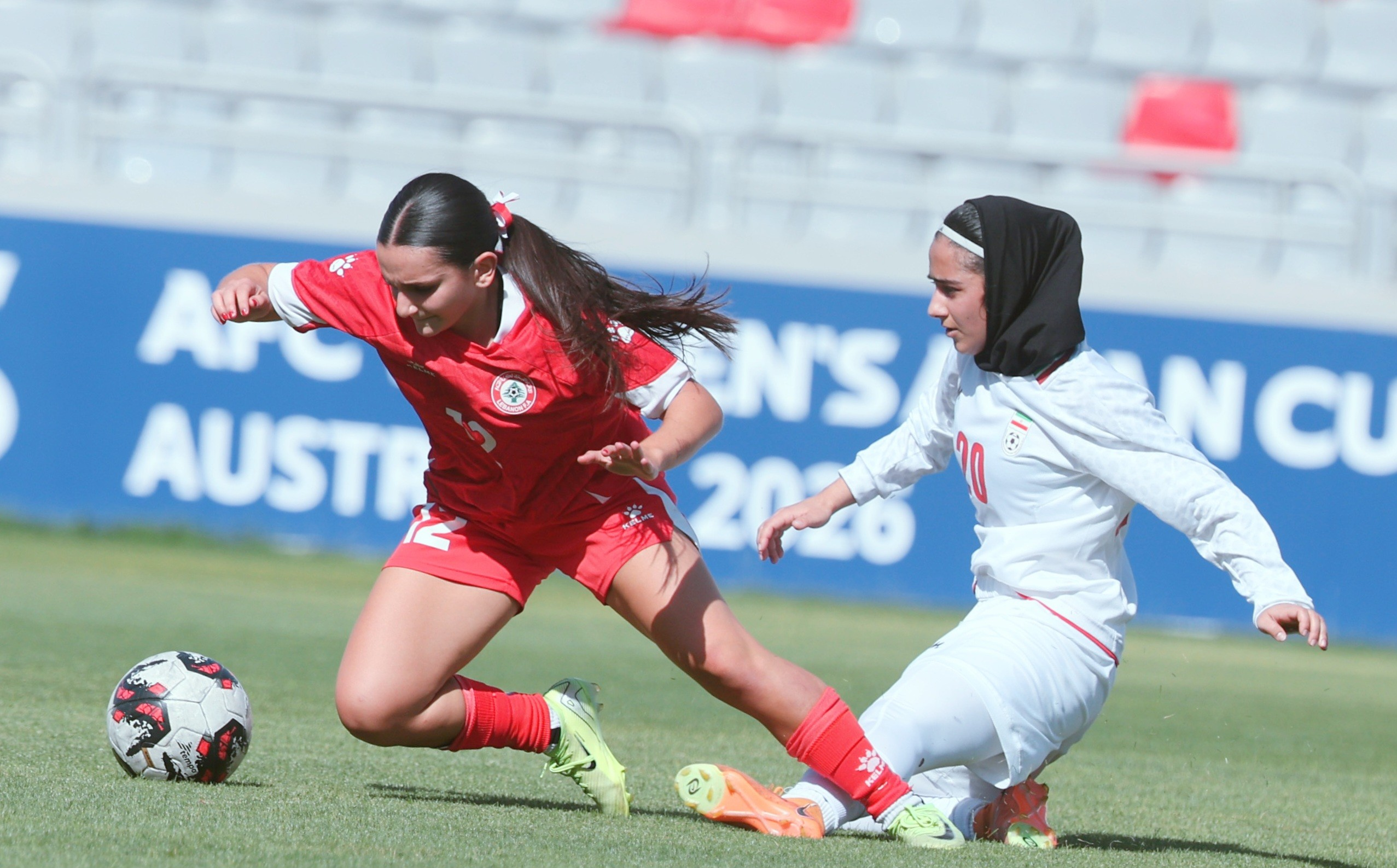
- Iran vs Lebanon, 2026 AFC Women's Asian Cup qualification
- Country: Iran
- Governing body: Football Federation Islamic Republic of Iran
- National team: Women's national team

National competitions
- FIFA Women's World Cup; AFC Women's Asian Cup

Club competitions
- Kowsar Women Football league Hazfi Cup (women)

International competitions
- Olympics; AFC Women's Club Championship

Women's football in Iran is very popular. Football has been a part of life for Iranians for many decades now and is played in schools, alleys, streets and football clubs nationwide. Women in Iran are increasingly inclined to play football, and with this increasing popularity it is only a matter of time before a more secure infrastructure develops. The Iran women's national football team competes internationally.

Women were not generally allowed to attend men's matches as spectators for around 40 years, from the time of the Iranian Revolution in 1979 until games in 2018 and 2019.

== History ==
=== 1970s ===
Women's football in Iran started in 1970. Women were participating in male football competitions in alleys and streets, and also took part in some men's football games. During that time, when numerous trainers participated in the top grade of FIFA's training courses in Japan, they were able to see the Japan women's national football team's games against female teams from Korea, Singapore and India. From 1970, serious measures were taken in order to reach appropriate standards.

Taj was the first club to train women in 1971, and Esteghlal Women F.C. was created. Thereafter, women took part first in football training and then in football teams such as Taj, Deyhim, Persepolis FC, Oghab FC and Khasram. By organising different competitions between those teams, the best players were selected and placed in the first Iranian women's national team. This team was composed of former volleyball players, basketball players and athletes aged from 12 to 18. They started to train more seriously as sport magazines published the news of their progress, then gradually a huge number of female fans arose to support the team. With the help of educational institutions across the country, talented youngsters were scouted. In 1971, competition was organised by a women's sport magazine and the travel company Scandinavian Airlines System (S.A.S) under the supervision of the Football Federation, for that occasion the Italy women's national football team was invited to Iran and had two games against Taj and a team called Tehran in the Amjadieh stadium.

=== 1979: Islamic revolution ===
Women's football continued to grow until the Iranian revolution in 1979. After that time, women were inhibited from playing, and organised football for women ceased to exist for decades. Instead, enthusiastic players turned to playing futsal, a form of indoor football. Women were obliged to wear the hijab as well as coverings for their arms and legs.

=== 1990s: Futsal ===
Started by Alzahra University around 1993, at first it faced the refusal by the sport's administration, however because of the passion shown by the students towards football, the university changed the law and the first unofficial female competition was organised since the Iranian revolution. In this competition 10 teams participated, most of them belong to Alzahra University, and the rest were from other national universities. Women's football activity continued to grow until finally, in 1997 the physical education organisation formed a women's futsal committee and since then officially sport clubs have begun to encourage women's futsal teams in Iran.

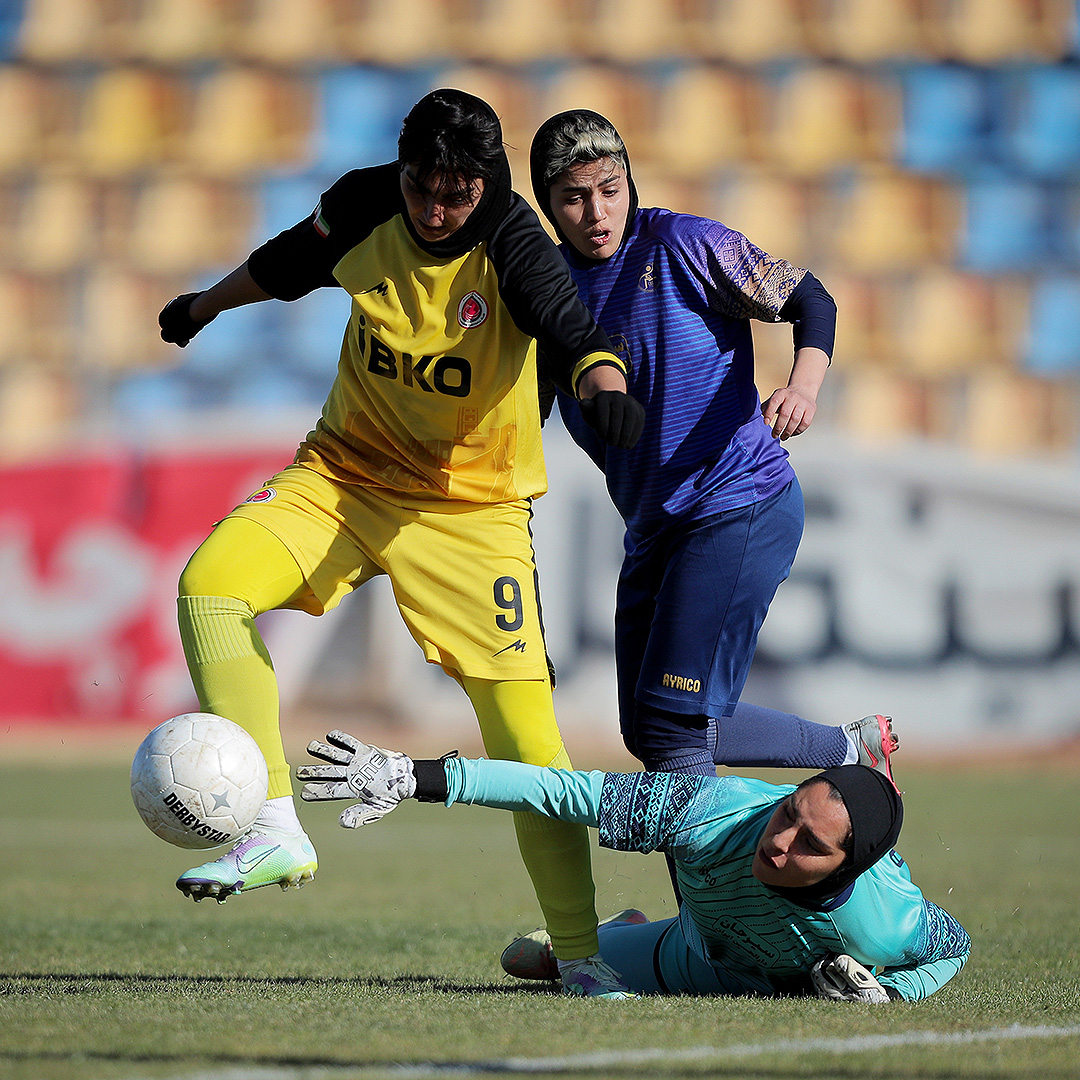
Zahra Ghanbari is about to score a goal in the Iran women's football league match between Bam Khatoon F.C and Shahrdari Sirjan

=== 21st century ===
In 2005, American-Iranian football player and enthusiast Katayoun Khosrowyar (Kat Khosrowyar) arrived in the country for a visit, and ended up staying and turning the game around. After hearing about her strengths in playing futsal, the women's president of the Iranian Football Federation as well as the later head coach of the first national team since the Revolution, called on her and asked her to stay. Over the ten years, Khorsrowyar helped to shift public perceptions about the sport, and participation numbers rose and a national women's team program was created, which included youth teams. She is better known to be the first American Iranian championing women's rights to play soccer in the Middle East, specifically in Iran.

By the early 2010s, Iran's senior women's side were well on their way to what could have been their first appearance at a 2012 London Olympic Games. However, a setback occurred when FIFA banned Iran from a second-round qualifier against Jordan in mid-2011 because of their having to wear hijab, which was enforced by the government.

After numerous meetings, FIFA eventually lifted the ban in 2014, along with the bans on turbans and kippahs for Sikh and Jewish men. In 2016, Iranian players wore their hijabs in a FIFA-approved tournament, the under-17 Women's World Cup held in Jordan, after for the first time in Iranian women's football history, a national team qualified for the top continental competition in 2015. The U20 and the U17 team's qualified for the Asian Championships in China for their respective age groups.

Today, the Iran women's national football team competes internationally.

The Kowsar Women Football league, established in 2007, is the primary women's football league in Iran. There were 11 teams participating in the 2020–21 season. Khatoon FC, based in Bam, is the most successful team in the history of the competition, with seven titles to their name.

== The "soccer revolution" ==
The football revolution (or soccer revolution; Persian: انقلاب فوتبال, romanized: Enqelâb Futbâl) refers to the events in Iran which began around 1997 in the context of football in that country. The idea of a "football revolution" is that the game itself can be used as a part of the secularization of Iran and frame women's rights movements in the country.

When the Iranian football team narrowly defeated Australia in the 1998 FIFA World Cup qualification on 29 November 1997, millions of Iranians celebrated the victory by dancing and singing in the streets, despite multiple government warnings against any secular-type celebrations. The most notable event on that day was that women breached the police barrier and entered the stadium, from which they were banned. Some women even took off their veils. There was open socialization between men and women in the streets. The Western press saw these events as a message to Islamic fundamentalists in Iran.

When subsequently Iran defeated the United States 2-1 during the actual 1998 FIFA World Cup on 21 June 1998, similar celebrations continued several days, with some women taking off veils and mingling with men, until Iran's 2–0 defeat by Germany.

Trying to open up stadiums to women to watch football was considered a form of social change. The idea was that football or soccer presented an alternative to Islamism through secular nationalism. Journalist Franklin Foer compared the football revolution with the Boston Tea Party. Iranians themselves see football as a way to "ease diplomatic tension" or as a way to create social change within the country.

=== Legacy ===
Since then Iranian women's rights activists started fighting for the right to enter stadiums, often violently breaking into them. A film by Jafar Panahi, Offside (2006), is about a group of young women who dress as boys in order to watch football at a stadium.

In April 2006 president Mahmoud Ahmadinejad lifted the ban on women entering stadiums despite the objections of conservatives, commenting that women and families help bring morality and chastity to public venues. However, the ban was reinstated by the Supreme Leader Ali Khamenei on 8 May 2006.

Further restrictions were enacted that enshrined the restrictions for international and national competitions. In December 2007 the vice president of the Iranian Olympic Committee, Abdolreza Savar, issued a memorandum to all sporting federations about the "proper behavior of male and female athletes" and that "severe punishment will be meted out to those who do not follow Islamic rules during sporting competitions" both local and abroad. Men are not allowed to train or coach women. Iran's female volleyball team was once considered the best in Asia, but due to the lack of female coaches it has been prevented from international competition.

Iranian women are allowed to compete in sports that require removal of the hijab, but only in arenas that are all female. They are banned from public events if spectators include unrelated men. Thus, of the 53 Iranian athletes in the Beijing Olympics, there were only three women: Sara Khoshjamal Fekri (taekwondo), Najmeh Abtin (shooting) and Homa Hosseini (rowing).

As of 2017 grassroots women's football organisations continue to flourish in Iran.

== Women as spectators ==
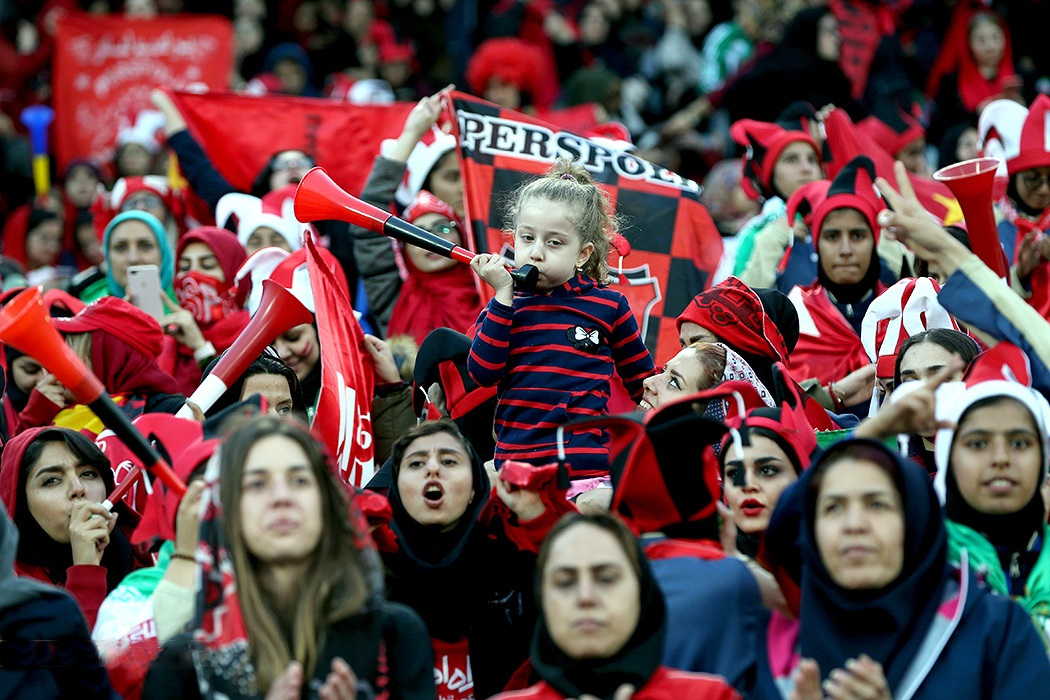
Female supporters of Persepolis at the AFC Champions League Final, 2018

Women were generally not allowed to attend men's football matches for decades after the Iranian revolution in 1979, ostensibly to protect them from inappropriate male behaviour. A few women, mainly supporters from outside Iran, were allowed to attend some games, and a small number of Iranian women in 2005. Around 100 women attended the Iran–Bolivia friendly match on 16 October 2018.

On 10 November 2018, hundreds of women attended the 2018 AFC Champions League Final 2nd leg at the 80,000-seat Azadi Stadium. On 9 November, Fatma Samoura, Secretary General of FIFA, had said she would ask the Iranian government to end the ban on women's entry to sport stadiums. In October 2019, the Iranian Government allowed women to watch a 2022 World Cup qualifier, when the men's team beat Cambodian football team 14–0. Up to 3,500 women attended the game in the Azadi Stadium.

After a year-long ban on all spectators owing to the COVID-19 pandemic in Iran, female spectators were allowed into a Tehran stadium for the first time in two years, to watch the men's team play the South Korean national team.

== See also ==
- Iran women's national football team
- Iran women's national futsal team
- Kowsar Women Football league
- Football Under Cover
