= Mohadeseh Goudasiaei =

Iranian footballer

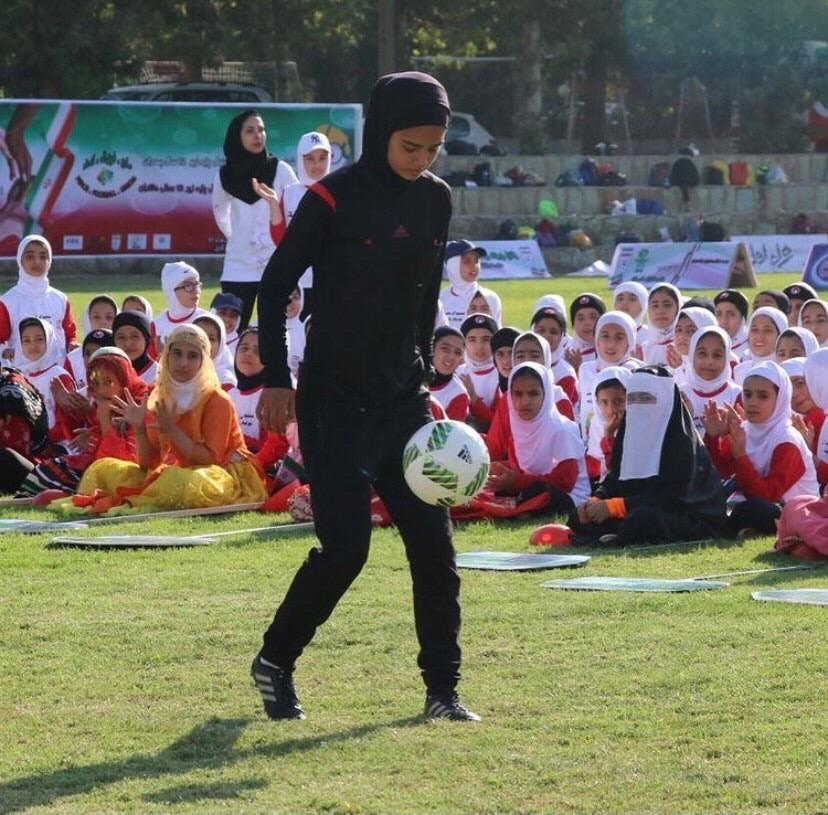
- Mohadeseh Goudasiaei

Personal information
- Date of birth: 12 June 2000 (age 26)
- Place of birth: Iran
- Position: Midfielder

International career
Years	Team	Apps	(Gls)
- Iran U19

Mohadeseh Goudasiai Persian: محدثه گود آسیایی (born 12 June 2000) is an Iranian professional football player who plays as a midfielder for the Iran under-19 national team. She is a student of sports sciences and the first lady with a record in Iran. Her first record in Milad Tower with 8694 rupees in one hour and her second record is Asian which lasted 3 hours and 11 minutes and was recorded about 21 thousand rupees.

== Honors ==
Goudasiai is a member of the national youth team and has been sent to Thailand, Vietnam, Uzbekistan and Russia. She is honored to be the runner-up in the Central Asian Cup in Uzbekistan and the fourth place in the international tournament in Sochi with Russia in the national team.

She plays in the national football premier league and is also a player on the students' national team. Mohadeseh Goodasiai is the goal scorer of the 97th Alborz Premier League with 27 goals in 7 games.

== Referee ==
GoudAsiaei is a second-grade football referee who became a third-grade referee at the age of 14, earning the title of the youngest referee in Iran. She has also holds an Asia Football D coaching degree and a Level 1 futsal certification from Iran and Rikamand in both disciplines.
