= Marziyeh Jafari =

Iranian football manager (born 1982)

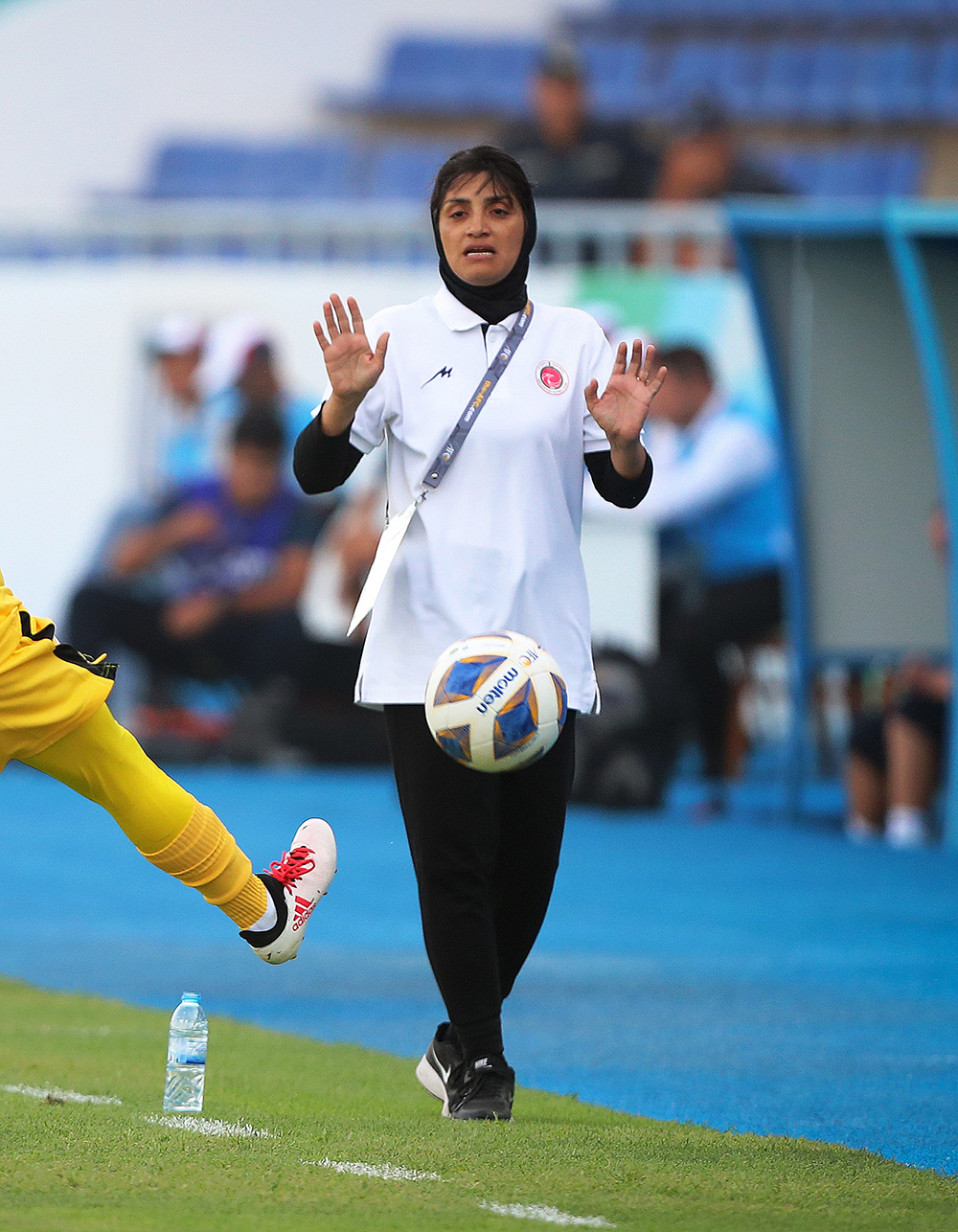
- Jafari managing Bam Khatoon F.C. in 2022

Personal information
- Full name: Marziyeh Jafari Baravati
- Date of birth: 23 September 1982 (age 44)
- Place of birth: Bam, Iran

Team information
- Current team: Bam Khatoon; Iran Women (Head Coach)

Managerial career
- Years: Team
- 2010–: Bam Khatoon
- 2025–: Iran Women

Marziyeh Jafari Baravati (Persian: مرضیه جعفری; born 23 September 1982 in Bam) is an Iranian women's football coach who is currently the head coach of the Iranian club Bam Khatoon Women's Football Club and the Iran women's national football team.

She is the most titled women's coach in Iran, having won 11 championship titles in Kowsar Women's Football League since 2008. In 2025, She became the AFC Coach of the year 2025.

== Honors ==
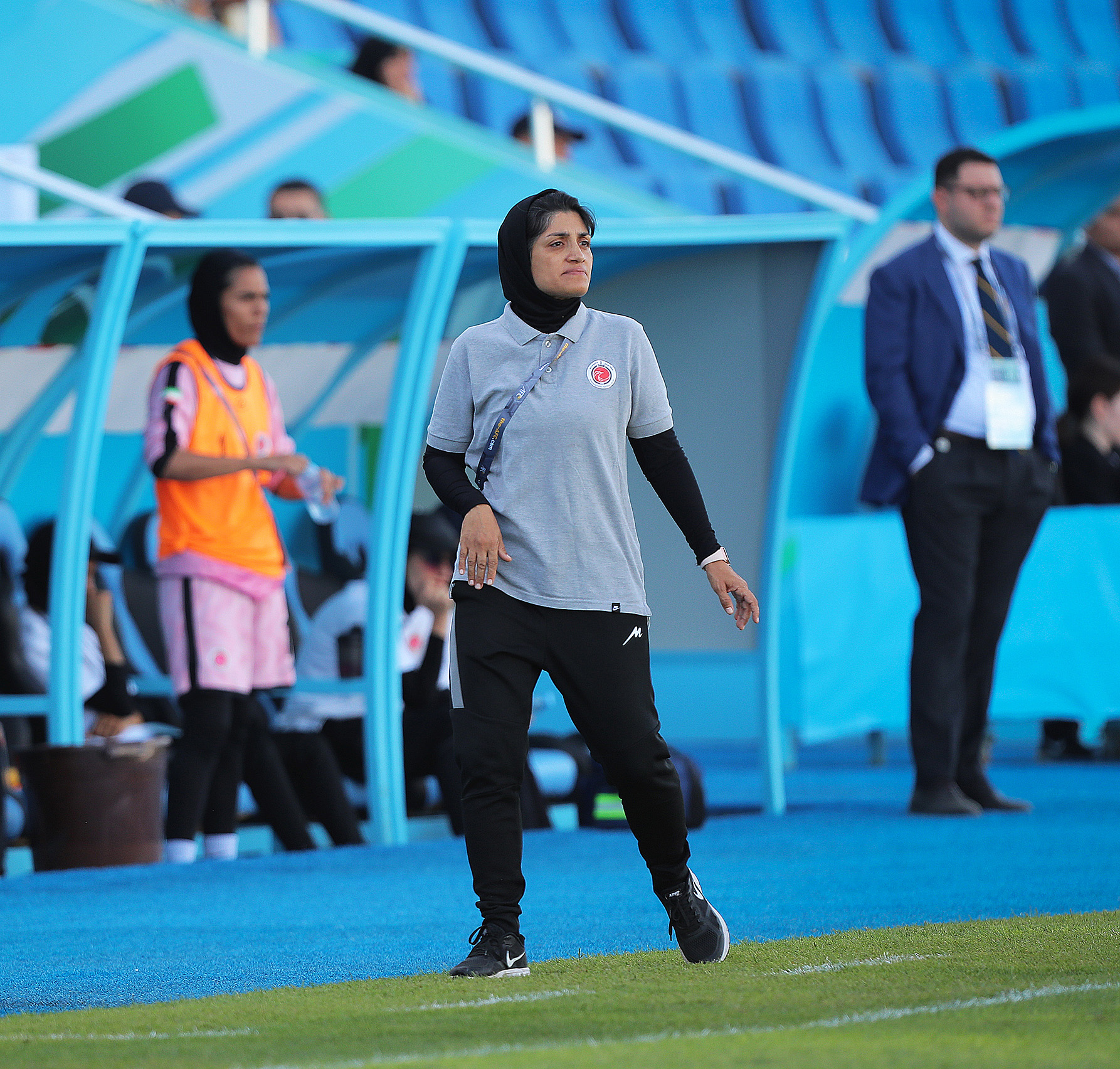
Marziyeh Jafari Baravati managing Bam Khatoon F.C in the AFC Women's Club Championship 2022

Bam Khatoon Women's F.C

- Kowsar Women Football League: 2011–12, 2012–13, 2013–14, 2014–15, 2017–18, 2018–19, 2019–20, 2021–22, 2022–23
- AFC Women's Club Championship runner-up: 2022
