= Zahra Sarbali =

Iranian footballer (born 1993)

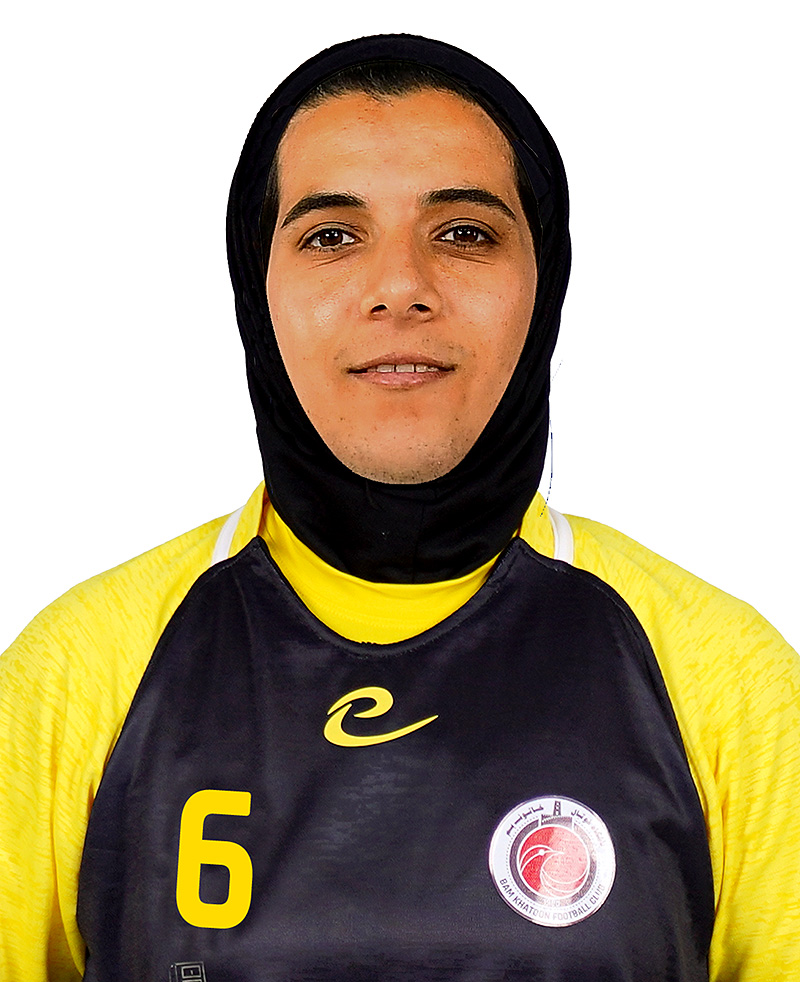
- Zahra Sarbali in 2021

Personal information
- Full name: Zahra Sarbali Alishah
- Date of birth: 13 August 1993 (age 33)
- Place of birth: Eslamshahr, Iran
- Position: Midfielder

Team information
- Current team: Bam Khatoon
- Number: 6

Senior career*
Years	Team	Apps	(Gls)
- Bam Khatoon

International career^{‡}
	Iran U19		(1)
2018–	Iran	8	(0)
- * Club domestic league appearances and goals ‡ National team caps and goals as of 9 April 2019

Zahra Sarbali Alishah (born 13 August 1993), known as Zahra Sarbali (Persian: زهرا سربالی), is an Iranian footballer who plays as a midfielder for Kowsar Women Football League club Bam Khatoon and the Iran women's national team. She has also played for the Iran U19 women's football team.

In March 2026, Sarbali, along with some teammates from the Iranian women's national football team, left the team's training camp in Australia and sought refuge due to concerns about possible retaliation from Iranian authorities. Political figures, including Reza Pahlavi, called for protection for the players. US President Donald Trump publicly urged the Australian government to grant asylum to the players, stating they could face persecution if they returned to Iran. The Australian government subsequently granted humanitarian visas to five players from the team. On 14 March, Sarbali, together with fellow Iranian players Soltan Meshkehkar and Mona Hamoudi, reversed their earlier decision to seek asylum and chose to return to Iran. The Tasnim News Agency added that they had rejected "psychological warfare, extensive propaganda and seductive offers".
