= Mona Hamoudi =

Iranian footballer (born 1993)

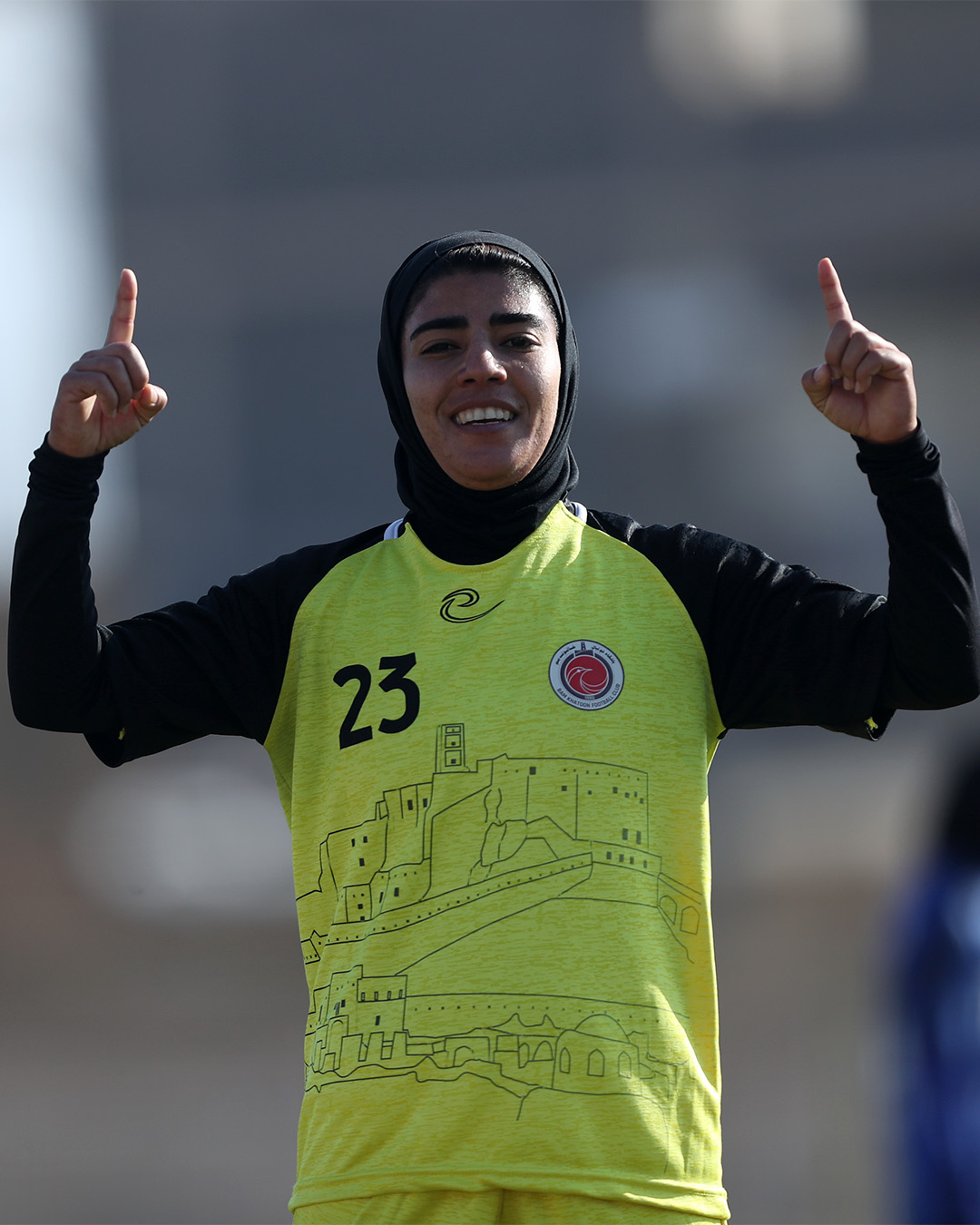
- Hamoudi playing for Bam Khatoon FC in 2021

Personal information
- Date of birth: 11 November 1993 (age 32)
- Place of birth: Ahvaz, Iran
- Position: Midfielder

Team information
- Current team: Bam Khatoon F.C
- Number: 23

Senior career*
Years	Team	Apps	(Gls)
- Bam Khatoon F.C

International career^{‡}
2018–	Iran	5	(2)
- * Club domestic league appearances and goals ‡ National team caps and goals as of 9 April 2019

Mona Hamoudi (Persian: مونا حمودی; born 11 November 1993) is an Iranian footballer who plays as a midfielder for Kowsar Women Football League club Bam Khatoon FC and the Iran women's national team.

In March 2026, Hamoudi, along with several teammates from the Iranian women's national football team, left the team's training camp in Australia and sought refuge due to fears of retaliation from Iranian authorities. Reports indicate that political figures, including Reza Pahlavi, called for protection for the players. US president Donald Trump publicly urged the Australian government to grant asylum to the players, stating they could face persecution if they returned to Iran. The Australian government subsequently granted humanitarian visas to the players. On 14 March, Manoudi, together with fellow Iranian players Soltan Meshkehkar and Zahra Sarbali, reversed their earlier decision to seek asylum and chose to return to Iran. The Tasnim News Agency added that they had rejected "psychological warfare, extensive propaganda and seductive offers".

== International goals ==
Scores and results list Iran's goal tally first.

No.	Date	Venue	Opponent	Score	Result	Competition
1.	6 April 2019	Saoud bin Abdulrahman Stadium, Al Wakrah, Qatar	Palestine	4–0	9–0	2020 AFC Women's Olympic Qualifying Tournament
2.	6 April 2019	Saoud bin Abdulrahman Stadium, Al Wakrah, Qatar	Palestine	5–0	9–0	2020 AFC Women's Olympic Qualifying Tournament
