= Clermont Foot 63 =

Association football club in France

Clermont
- Full name: Clermont Foot 63
- Nickname: Les Lanciers (The Lancers)
- Short name: Clermont, CF63
- Founded: 1911; 115 years ago
- Ground: Stade Gabriel-Montpied
- Capacity: 11,980
- Owner: Ahmet Schaefer
- President: Ahmet Schaefer
- Manager: David Guion
- League: Ligue 2
- 2025–26: Ligue 2, 13th of 18
- Website: www.clermontfoot.com
Home colours	Away colours

Clermont Foot 63 (commonly referred to as Clermont Foot) is a French professional football club based in Clermont-Ferrand, France. It competes in Ligue 2. The first incarnation of the club was formed in 1911 and the current club was created in 1990 as a result of a merger.

The club plays its home matches at the Stade Gabriel-Montpied located within the city. In 2014, Clermont became the first professional team to appoint a female manager when they appointed Helena Costa. In 2021, the club achieved promotion to Ligue 1 for the first time in its history. It returned to Ligue 2 in 2024.

== History ==
The club started in 1911 under the name Stade Clermontois. Despite little league success in the early days, they reached the semi-finals of the Coupe de France during the 1945–46 season. Their professional status was repealed after the 1946–47 season due to financial difficulties. The club became professional again in 1966. 1984 saw an expansion, with Stade-Clermontois and AS Montferrand merging to form Clermont-Ferrand Football Club (CFC). The club was placed in the third division.

The club was later renamed Clermont Foot Auvergne, having to start again in the Division Honneur. After 13 years, Clermont Foot got promoted multiple times, from the Division Honneur up to Ligue 2 in 1993. During these 13 years of success, the club had numerous successes in the Coupe de France. One notable cup run was in 1997, when the Auvergne club eliminated three professional sides, Martigues, Lorient and then Paris Saint-Germain, before succumbing to Nice.

The club won the Championnat National in 2007, being promoted to Ligue 2 again, from which they had been relegated in 2006.

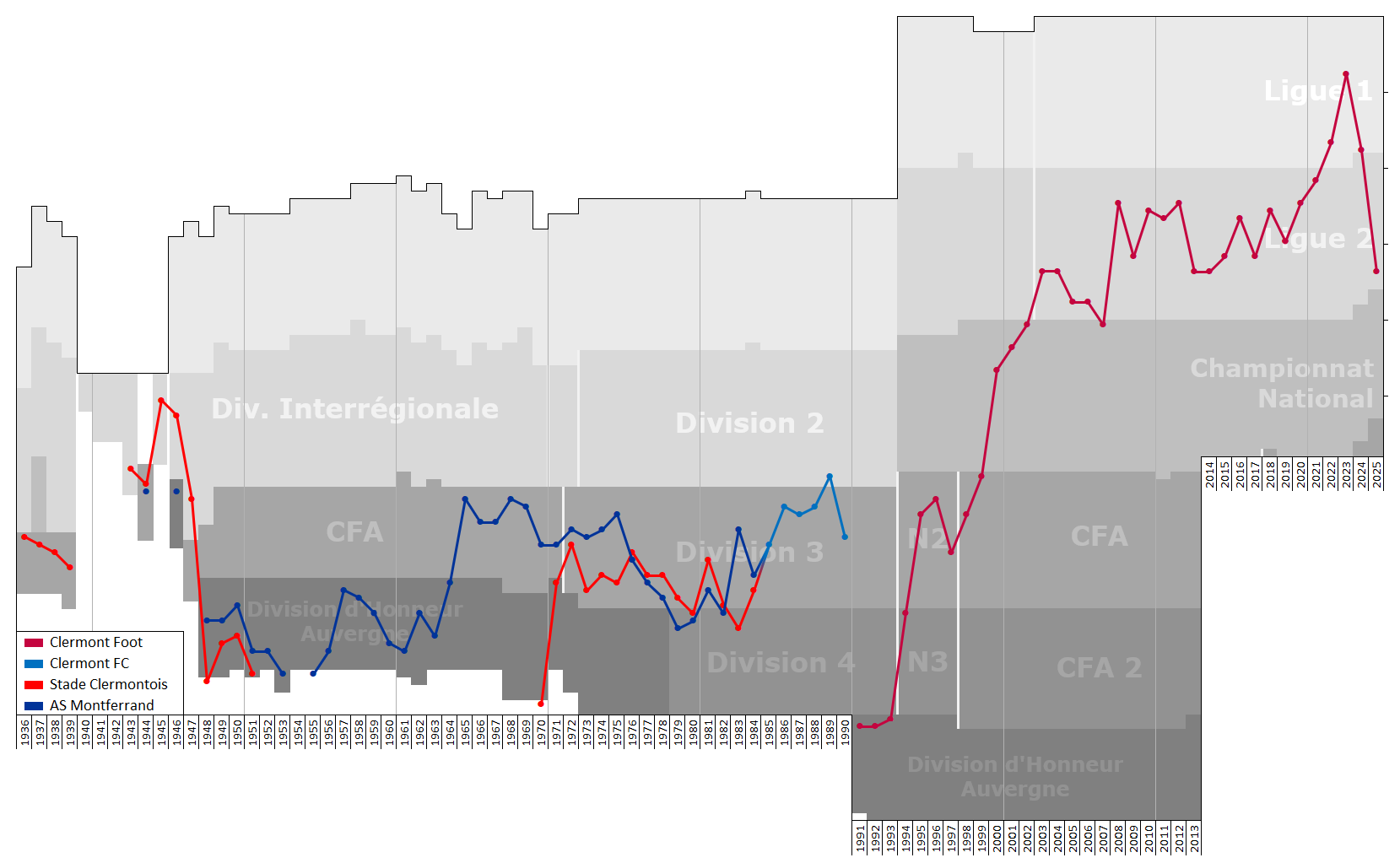
Historical league performance chart of Clermont Foot 63

In 2014, Clermont became the first French professional men's team to appoint a female manager when they appointed Helena Costa. Less than a month after taking charge, Costa quit her role, and was replaced by another woman, Corinne Diacre, who would go on to train the French women's team.

Clermont were promoted to Ligue 1 for the 2021–22 season for the first time in their history, having achieved promotion to the league after finishing second in the 2020–21 edition of Ligue 2. After 3 years, the club was relegated following the 2023–24 season.

== Honours ==
- Championnat National
  - Champions (2): 2001–02, 2006–07

== Players ==
=== Current squad ===
As of 3 September 2026

Note: Flags indicate national team as defined under FIFA eligibility rules; some limited exceptions apply. Players may hold more than one non-FIFA nationality.

No.	Pos.	Nation	Player
2	MF	MAR	Abdellah Baallal
3	DF	MAD	Andy Pelmard
4	DF	COD	Ethan Kena Kabeya
5	MF	FRA	Jean Grillot
6	MF	FRA	El Hadj Koné
7	FW	FRA	Florian Bianchini (on loan from Swansea City)
8	MF	ALG	Yuliwes Bellache
9	FW	POR	Luís Semedo
10	MF	CAF	Junior Sambia
11	FW	ALG	Maïdine Douane
12	DF	COD	Vital Nsimba
13	MF	FRA	Julien Astic
16	GK	SEN	Massamba Ndiaye
17	FW	SEN	Ousmane Diop
18	MF	FRA	Noam Strotz

No.	Pos.	Nation	Player
19	MF	FRA	Mohamed-Amine Bouchenna
21	DF	GUF	Yoann Salmier
23	MF	FRA	Adrien Hunou
26	MF	MLI	Rominigue Kouamé
28	DF	CIV	Ivan M'Bahia
29	FW	FRA	Arthur Saintorens
30	GK	FRA	Théo Guivarch
39	FW	FRA	Jean Nyindong Tsamouna
44	MF	FRA	Allan Ackra
45	DF	FRA	Matys Donavin
77	FW	FRA	Enzo Cantero
90	FW	FRA	Christ Okou (on loan from Paris FC)
93	DF	FRA	Ibrahim Coulibaly
97	DF	MAD	Kenji-Van Boto

=== Retired numbers ===
14 - (France) Clément Pinault, defender (2008–09) – posthumous honour

=== Notable former players ===
For a list of former Clermont Foot players, see Category:Clermont Foot 63 players.

== Club officials ==
Position	Staff
President	(Switzerland) Ahmet Schaefer
Sporting director	(Germany) Ingo Winter
Manager	(France) David Guion
Assistant manager	(France) Emmanuel Gas
First-team coach	(France) Yann Cavezza (France) Stéphane Héros (France) Jérémy Faug-Porret
Goalkeeper coach	(France) Eric Gélard
Fitness coach	(France) Dylan Jamet
Match analyst	(France) Cyril Poussin
Scout	(France) Philippe Vaugeois (France) Michel Ogier
Club doctor	(France) Nicolas Lamaudière
Physiotherapist	(France) Séverine Chapeyron (France) Milan Ladjic
Medical director physiotherapy	(France) Julien Jarlier
Performance manager	(France) Eric Pégorer

== Coaches ==
- Albert Rust (2000–2001)
- Hubert Velud (2001–2004)
- Olivier Chavanon (2004–2005)
- Dominique Bijotat (2005)
- Marc Collat (2005–2006)
- Didier Ollé-Nicolle (2006–2009)
- Michel Der Zakarian (2009–2012)
- Régis Brouard (2012–2014)
- Helena Costa (7 May 2014 – 24 June 2014)
- Corinne Diacre (28 June 2014 – 30 August 2017)
- Pascal Gastien (2017–2024)
- Sébastien Bichard (2024)
- Laurent Batlles (2024–2025)
- Grégory Proment (2025–)
