= Katayoun Khosrowyar =

Iranian-American football coach (born 1987)

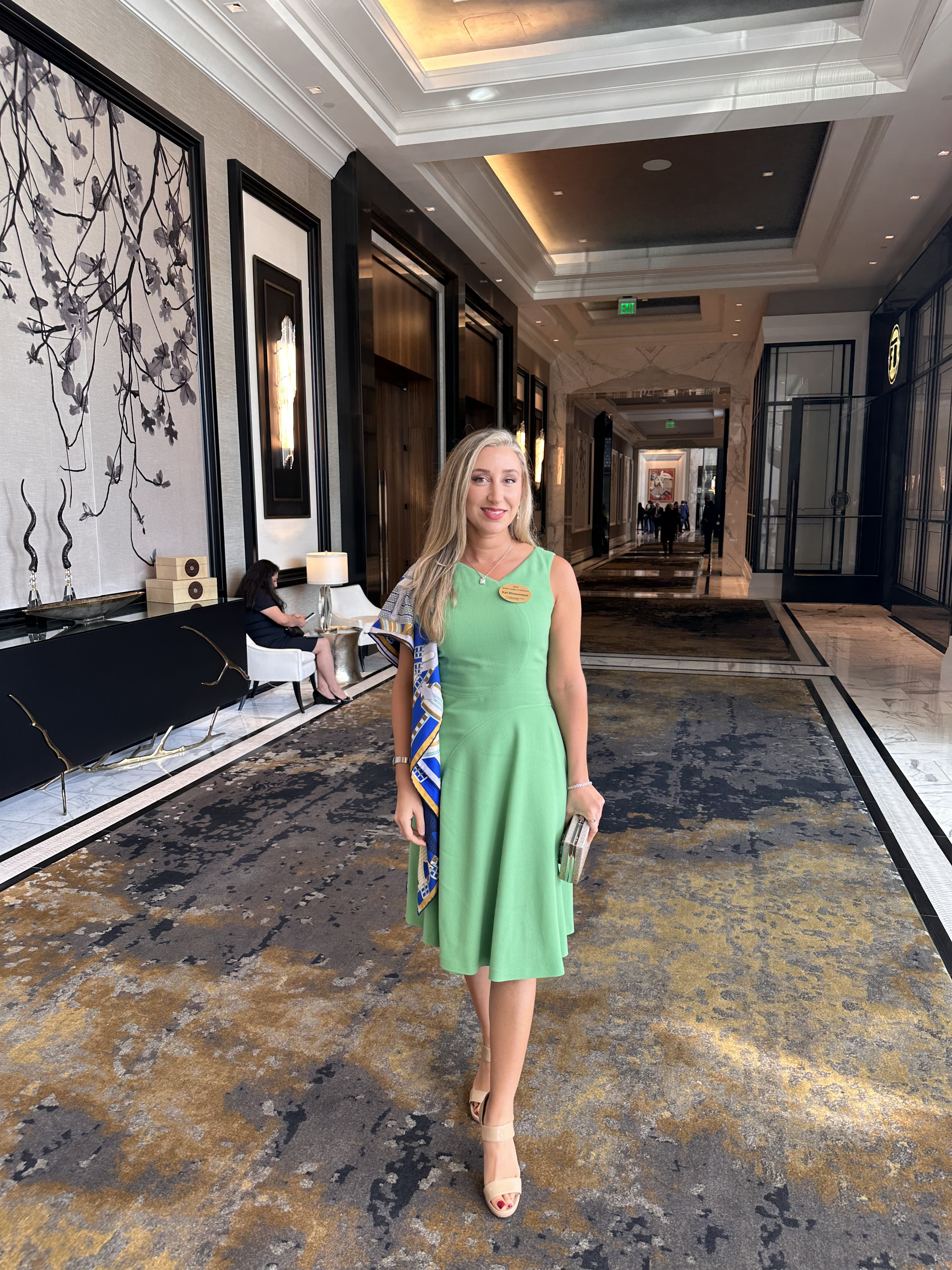
- Khosrowyar at the World Affairs Houston Gala in 2023

Personal information
- Full name: Katahyunne Laudanne Khosrowyar
- Date of birth: 19 September 1987 (age 39)
- Place of birth: Tulsa, Oklahoma, U.S.
- Position: Midfielder

Youth career
- Tulsa Soccer Club
- Holland Hall Dutch

Senior career*
Years	Team	Apps	(Gls)
2006–2008	Carranza FC		

International career
2005–2013	Iran		

Managerial career
- 2018: Iran U19
- 2019–202?: OL Reign Academy
- * Club domestic league appearances and goals

Katahyunne Laudanne "Katayoun" Khosrowyar (Persian: کتایون خسرویار; born 19 September 1987), commonly known as Kat or Kat Khosrowyar, is an Iranian-American football coach. She is better known as the former head coach of the Iran women's national under-19 team.

== Career ==
Khosrowyar was born in Tulsa, Oklahoma, to an Iranian father and American mother. She played for a then-highly ranked club in Oklahoma (Tulsa Soccer Club). Khosrowyar also played varsity soccer, field hockey, and track and field at her private high school Holland Hall. She decided to move to Iran in 2005, during her first visit when she was only 17 years old after accepting to play for Iran. In 2010, Katayoun was nominated by the Asian Football Confederation (The AFC) to participate in Project Future, a coaching program for soccer players under 30. After retiring from playing in 2013, Kat earned a FIFA/AFC 'A' license in 2014, the first Iranian woman to do so. The purpose, she tells Women's Soccer Coaching, is to “put all my skills, abilities and experience under one umbrella”. It would need to be a sizeable umbrella. Katayoun Khosrowyar has a master's degree in chemical engineering from the University of Birmingham in the United Kingdom and recently completed a second master's degree in Global Affairs at Rice University.

Khosrowyar moved back to the United States in 2019 to become the head coach of OL Reign Academy.

== Awards ==
Khosrowyar has won the 2018 Women's Soccer United Coach Award, awarded to inspirational coaches in women's soccer based on a public poll. Khosrowyar was also nominated best coach of Asia 2019 alongside Japan's head coach Asako Takakura.

== The Middle East and Central Asia ==
In 2011, she was a part of the 'Let Us Play'campaign led by Prince Ali bin Hussein of Jordan that helped overturn a FIFA hijab ban. FIFA allowed 'head covering for religious reasons for every Muslim female player in the organization's member countries. This was critical for Iranian female football players to continue to play in FIFA competitions after being banned from playing during the second round of pre-Olympic qualifications.

After the Taliban banned the participation of girls in sports in September 2021, Khosrowyar was part of a group that was formed to help a group of 80 people, composed of 26 members of the Afghani female youth team, to leave the country and pursue soccer careers internationally.
