= Helena Costa =

Portuguese football manager

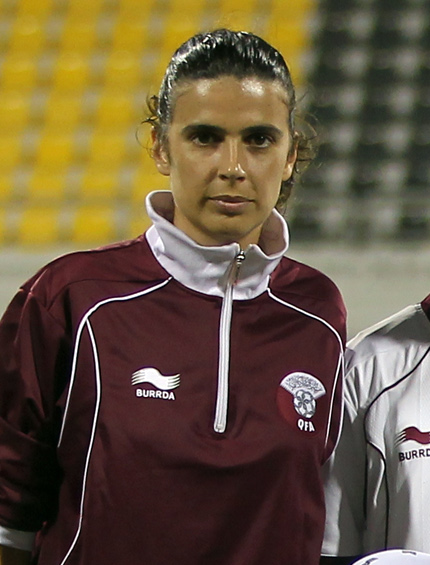
- Costa as the coach of Qatar before a match against Iran women's national football team

Personal information
- Full name: Helena Margarida dos Santos e Costa
- Date of birth: 15 April 1978 (age 48)
- Place of birth: Alhandra, Portugal

Managerial career
- Years: Team
- 1997–2010: Benfica (youth)
- 2005–2006: Cheleirense
- 2006–2008: 1º Dezembro (Women)
- 2008–2009: Odivelas (Women)
- 2010–2012: Qatar (Women)
- 2012–2014: Iran (Women)
- 2014: Clermont Foot

Helena Margarida dos Santos e Costa (born 15 April 1978) is a Portuguese football manager. She managed Iran women's national football team from 2012 to 2014. She is currently the sporting director at Estoril.

== Career ==
Costa has a master's degree in sports science and a UEFA A Licence in coaching. From 1997 to 2010, she coached Benfica's youth team, leading them to second place in the national championship in 2005. At the same time, she managed lower league side Cheleirense, winning the Lisbon championship in 2006. She also managed women's sides, winning two league titles with S.U. 1º Dezembro in 2007 and 2008, and taking Odivelas to promotion to the top flight as second division champions. From 2008 to 2011, she was a scout for Scottish club Celtic F.C. in Portugal and Spain. Costa returned to Celtic as a scout for separate spells in 2012 and in 2013.

As an international manager, she managed Qatar's women to their first ever victory (4–1 against the Maldives in 2012). On 22 October 2012 she was appointed manager of Iran's women but could not lead them to the 2015 World Cup.

She was initially going to coach French Ligue 2 club Clermont Foot from the end of the 2013–14 season becoming the first female coach of a professional football club in France, and the first in the top two tiers of a major European league. France's Women's Minister, Najat Vallaud-Belkacem, reacted to Costa's announced appointment at Clermont Foot by writing "Congratulations to Clermont Foot for understanding that giving a place to women is the future of professional football" on Twitter. However, in June 2014, she decided to quit the position, citing "total amateurism" and a "lack of respect" from the part of the club, with the sporting director having players signed without her consent and would not reply to her attempts to contact him. Costa was replaced by another woman, Corinne Diacre.

Costa was appointed as a scout for Eintracht Frankfurt in June 2017.

In December 2022, Costa followed Ben Manga from Germany to England to join EFL Championship club Watford as Head of Scouting. On 30 December 2023, she announced that she had left her position at the Hertfordshire-based club.

As of February 2026, she is the world's only female sporting director in men's football.
