= Ettelaat-e Banuvan =

Women's magazine in Iran

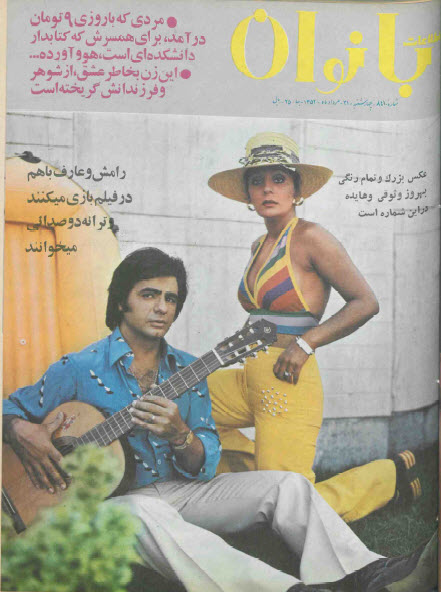
Cover of an issue of the Ettelā'āt-e Bānuvān weekly (22 August 1973)

Ettelā'āt-e Bānuvān (Persian: اطلاعات بانوان) or Banovan, was one of the early women's magazines published in Tehran, Iran. The magazine was established by Ettelaat Publishing Group in 1957. The first issue of the magazine which was published on a weekly basis appeared in April 1957.

Ettelā'āt-e Bānuvān covered news on celebrities, the royal family, health, beauty, and other topics related to women. It also featured articles on home decoration with a special reference to modern furnitures and color compositions. The first chief editor of Ettelā'āt-e Bānuvān and one of its founders was Iraj Mosta'an, who was succeeded by Pari Abasalti in 1968.

The magazine was closed in 1979, but was reopened in 1981. Ettelā'āt-e Bānuvān continued until 1980, and relaunched the following year under the title Rah-e Zaynab, and the editorship of Zahra Rahnavard.

== See also ==
- List of women's magazines
