= Maria Grazia Gerwien =

Italian association football player

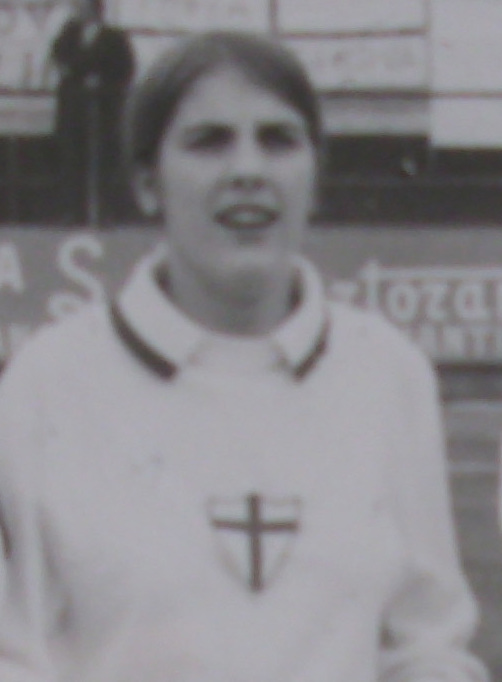

Personal information
- Date of birth: 15 July 1951 (age 75)
- Position: Forward

Maria Grazia Gerwien is an Italian former professional footballer who played as a forward for Genoa.

== Honours ==
=== Genoa ===
- Serie A: 1968

=== Italy ===
- 1969 European Competition for Women's Football
