= Pari Abasalti =

Iranian woman politician

Pari Abasalti پری اباصلتی
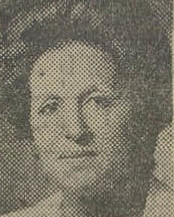
- Abasalti when she was a member of the 24th term of the National Consultative Assembly.
- Born: 1935 (age 90–91); Tehran, Pahlavi Iran (now Iran)
- Other name: Pari Abasalti Mir Hashem
- Education: University of Tehran
- Occupations: politician, journalist
- Known for: Editor-in-chief of Ettelaat-e Banuvan
- Movement: Feminist movement

Pari Abasalti (Persian: پری اباصلتی; born 1935 in Tehran) is an Iranian-born American politician and journalist. She was elected to the Iranian National Consultative Assembly in 1975, and was a member of parliament until the Iranian Revolution in 1979, when she left Iran and immigrated to the United States.

She is remembered as editor-in-chief of Ettelaat-e Banuvan, an Iranian women's magazine. While living in the United States she founded the magazine "Rah-e Zendi," which translates to "way of living" that is still running in Los Angeles.
