= Bam Khatoon F.C. =

Association football club in Bam, Iran

Bam Khatoon باشگاه فوتبال زنان خاتون بم
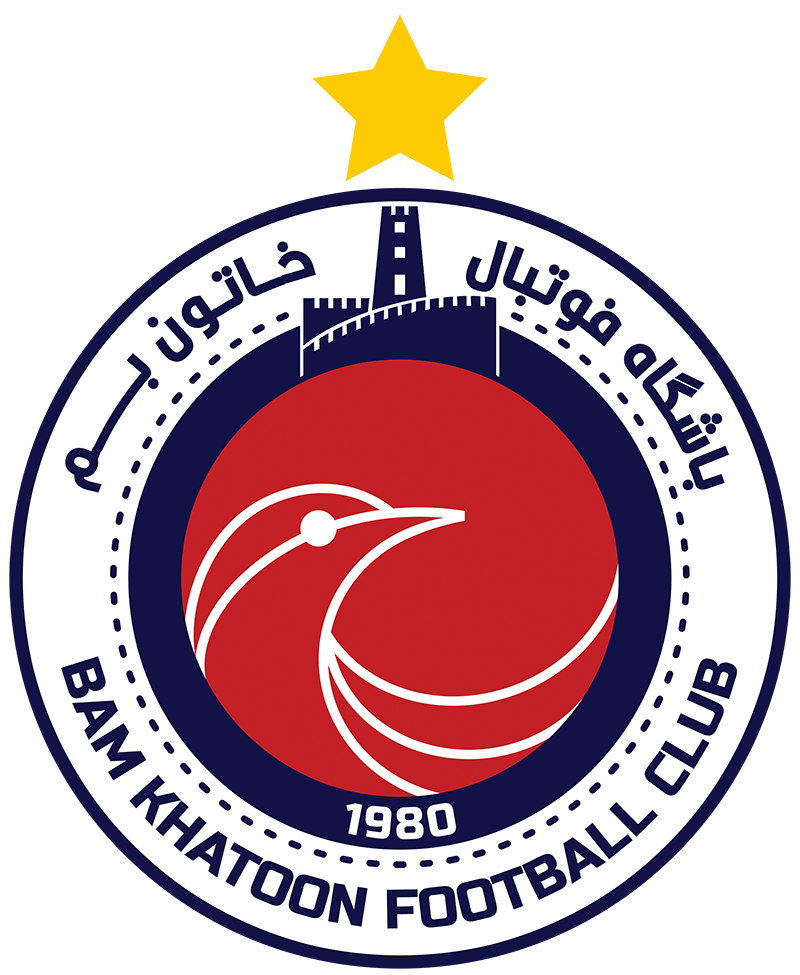
- Full name: Bam Khatoon Women's Football Club
- Founded: 1980; 46 years ago as Bam FC
- Stadium: Fajr Stadium, Bam, Iran
- Capacity: 8,000
- Owner(s): Bam Khatoon Cultural, Sports, Economic Company (LLC)
- Chairman: Iman Farzin
- Head coach: Marziyeh Jafari
- League: Iranian Kowsar Women League
- 2024–25: Iran Women's Premier League, 1st of 10 (champions)

Bam Khatoon Women's Football Club (Persian: باشگاه فوتبال زنان خاتون بم, Bashgah-e Futbal-e Zenan-e Xatun Bem) formerly Shahrdari Bam, is an Iranian professional women's football club based in Bam which plays in the Iranian Kowsar Women League. It also qualified for the inaugural AFC Women's Champions League in 2023. The club is the most titled of the Iranian women's league, having won 12 championships.

== History ==
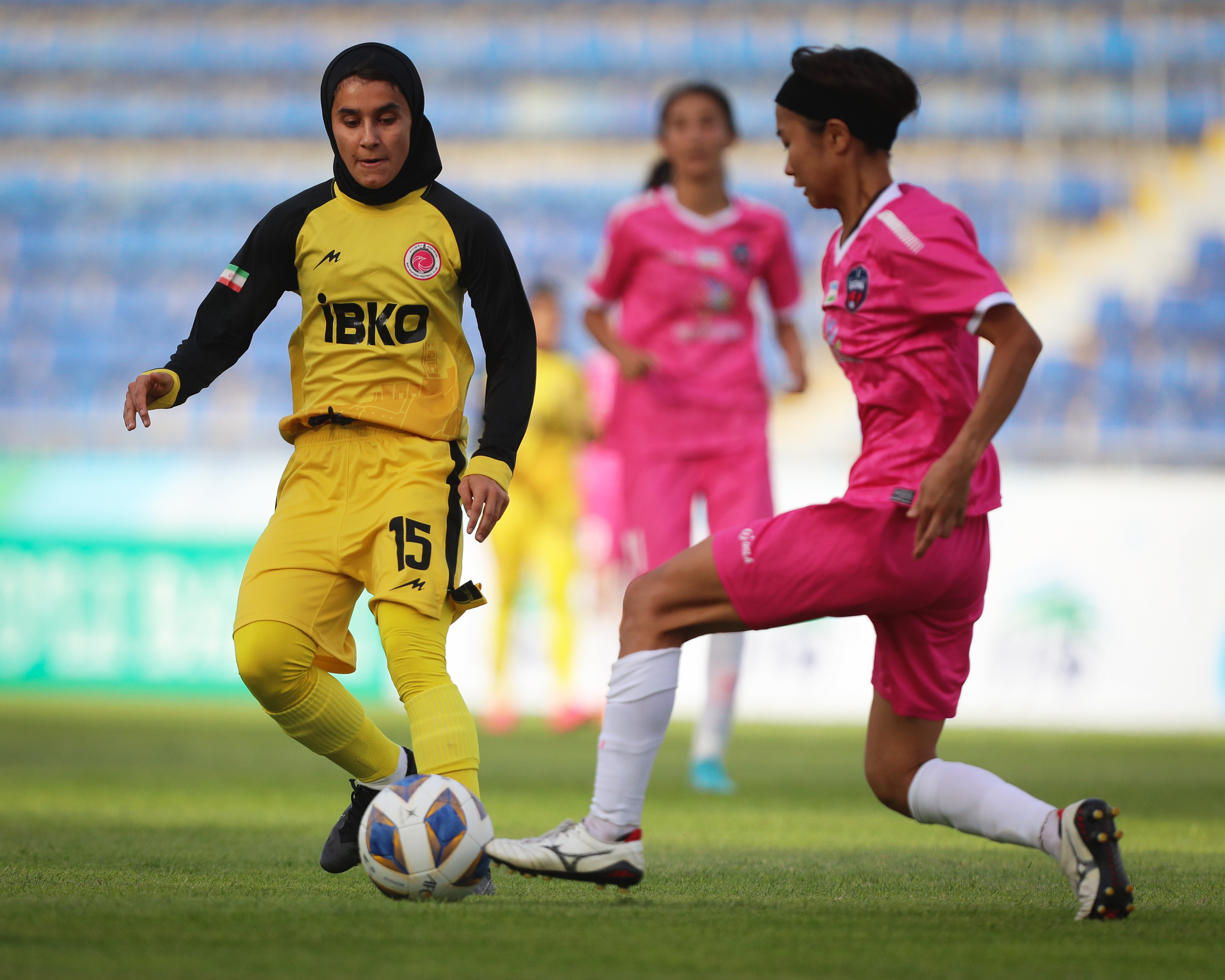
Bam Khatoon plays against Sogdiana at the AFC Women's Club Championship 2022

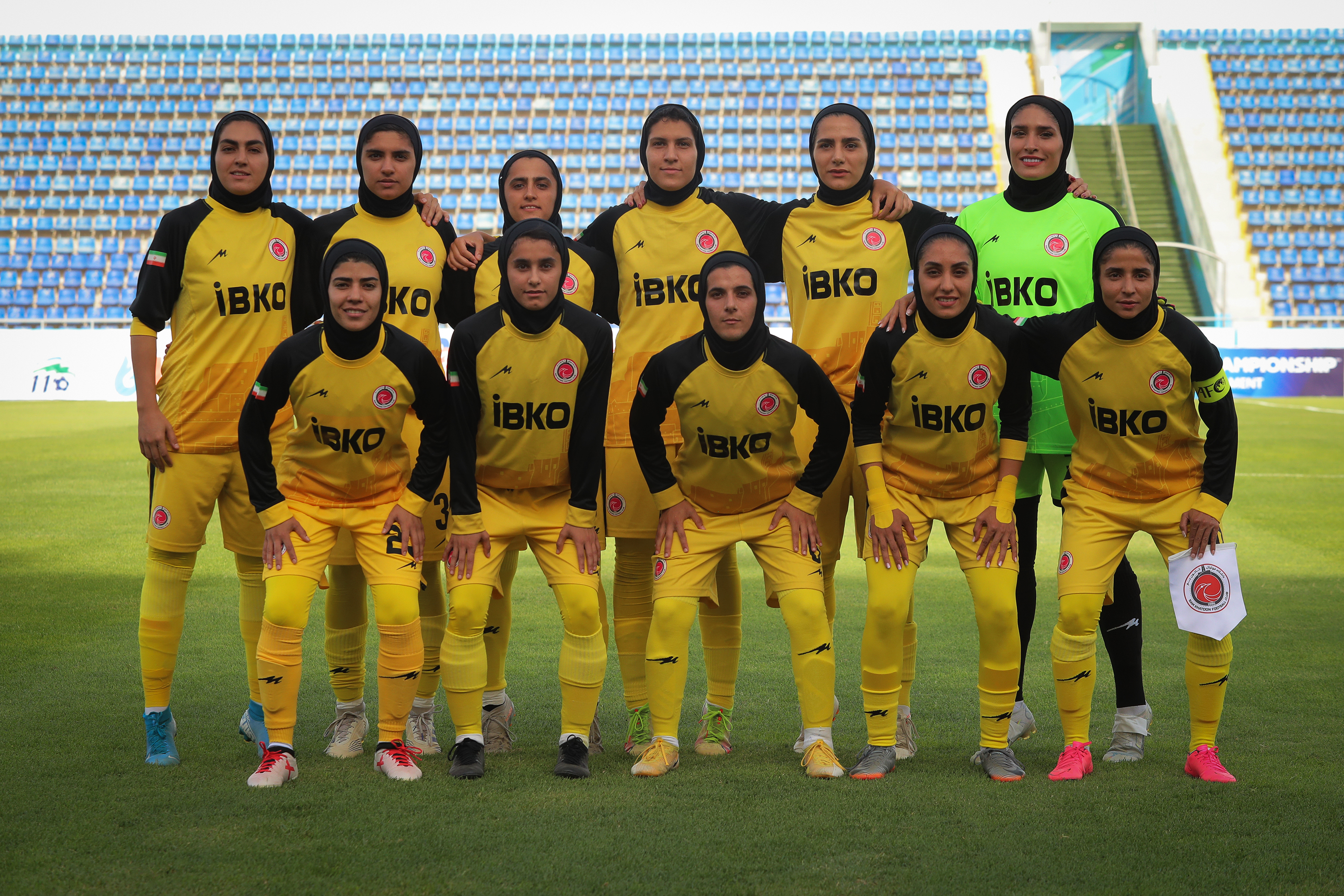
Bam Khatoon Women's F.C. at the AFC Club Championship 2022

Bam Khatoon F.C. was founded in 1980 and is based in Bam, Kerman Province, Iran. In May 2021, the club announced that they would take over Shahrdari Bam and rebranded the club as Bam Khatoon F.C. in line with an agreement with the municipality of Bam.

Bam Khatoon Women's F.C. held the most crowded championship celebration in women's sports history in Iran, hosting around 30000 spectators in Bam in June 2022.

Bam Khatoon F.C. is the first ever women's football club in Iran to be granted an the AFC Club Licence in 2023. The AFC professional club licence is mandatory to participate in the AFC Women's Champions League, since its inaugural edition in 2024.

== Honors ==
The club is the most titled of the Kowsar women's league, having won 12 championships as of 2025.

- Iran Women Football League
  - Winners (10): 2011–12, 2012–13, 2013–14, 2014–15, 2017–18, 2018–19, 2019–20, 2021–22, 2022–23, 2023–24, 2024-25, 2025-26
  - Runners-up (2): 2016–17, 2020–21

== Players ==
=== Current squad ===
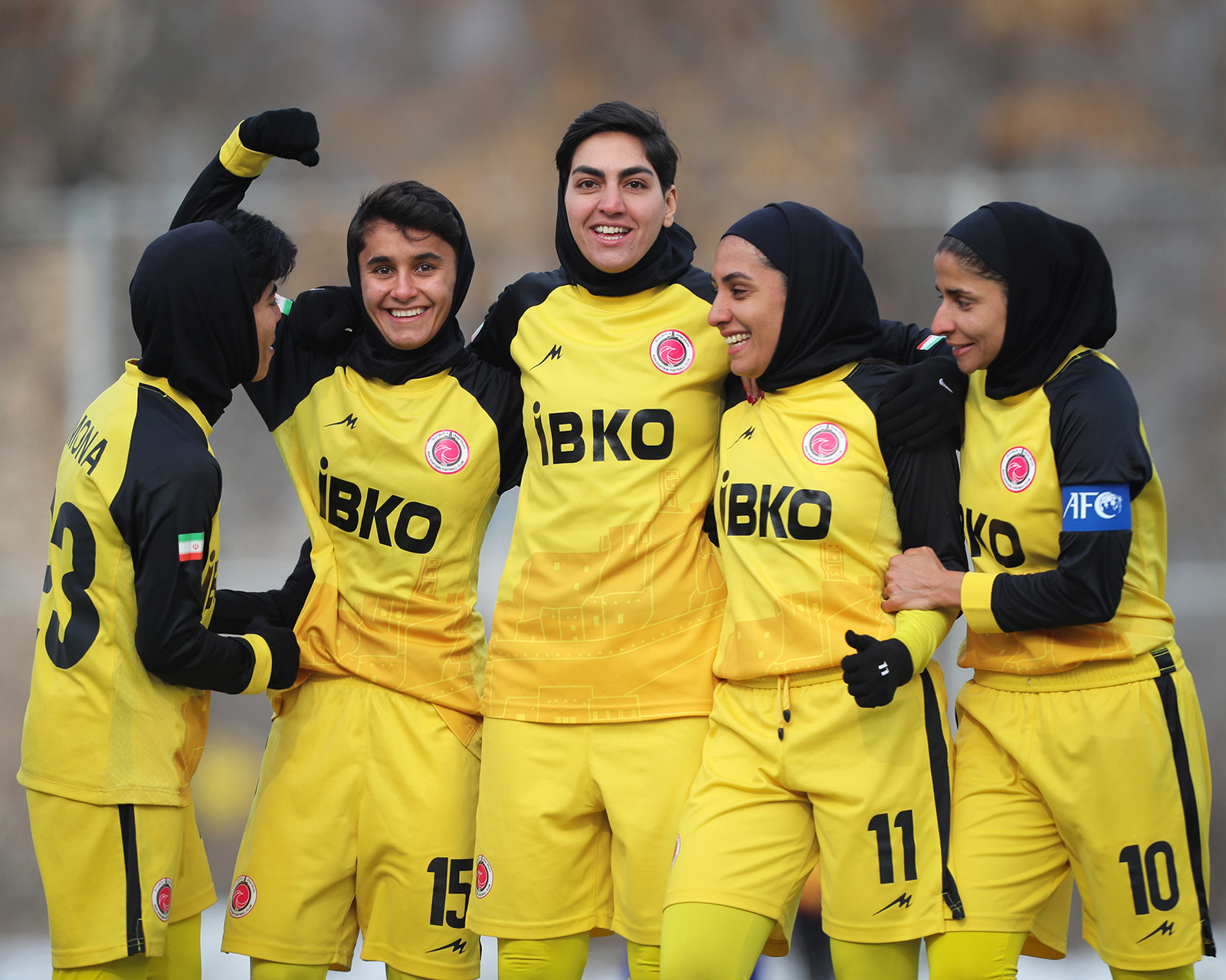
Bam Khatoon players celebrating after a goal (2023)

As of 25 December 2025

Note: Flags indicate national team as defined under FIFA eligibility rules; some limited exceptions apply. Players may hold more than one non-FIFA nationality.

No.	Pos.	Nation	Player
1	GK	IRI	Mahdiyeh Molaei
3	DF	IRI	Soha Karamshahi
4	MF	IRI	Roujin Tamrian
6	MF	IRI	Zahra Sarbali
7	MF	IRI	Fatemeh Geraeli *
11	MF	IRI	Samaneh Chahkandi
12	GK	IRI	Raha Yazdani
13	FW	IRI	Fatemeh Amineh
15	FW	IRI	Negin Zandi

No.	Pos.	Nation	Player
17	DF	IRI	Shahnaz Jafarizadeh
23	MF	IRI	Mona Hamoudi *
24	FW	IRI	Tahereh Pirouzi
70	FW	IRI	Sara Didar
88	DF	IRI	Sarshin Kamangar
99	MF	IRI	Maryam Dini

*On 9 March 2026, Zahra Sarbali, Fatemeh Pasandideh, Atefeh Ramezanizadeh and Mona Hamoudi, along with Persepolis and former Bam forward Zahra Ghanbari, as members of the Iran women's national football team at the 2026 AFC Women's Asian Cup tournament in Australia, left the team's training camp and sought asylum due to fears of retaliation from Iranian authorities. The team had refused to sing the national anthem shortly after the beginning of the 2026 Iran war. Later, five of the players returned to Iran, while Fatemeh Pasandideh and Atefeh Ramezanisadeh remained in Australia and started training with A-League team Brisbane Roar.

== International friendlies ==
Bam Khatoon Women's F.C. is the only and first ever Iranian women's football team that held an International camp overseas. They lost against Tomiris Touran (Kazakhstan Women's Football Championship runner-up) and a 1–0 victory against BIIK Shymkent, Kazakhstan's champion in August 2022.

== Continental record ==
Season	Competition	Round	Club	Home	Away	Aggregate
2022	AFC Club Championship	Group B	(Uzbekistan) Sogdiana Jizzakh	1–1	0–1	1–2
2023	AFC Club Championship	Group B	(Australia) Sydney FC	0–3		4th
2023	AFC Club Championship	Group B	(South Korea) Incheon Red Angels	1–2		4th
2023	AFC Club Championship	Group B	(Uzbekistan) FC Nasaf	2–2		4th
2024–25	AFC Champions League	Preliminary round	(Bhutan) Royal Thimphu College	2–1		1st
2024–25	AFC Champions League	Preliminary round	(Hong Kong) Kitchee	2–0		1st
2024–25	AFC Champions League	Group B	(Australia) Melbourne City	1–2		2nd
2024–25	AFC Champions League	Group B	(Philippines) Kaya–Iloilo	1–1		2nd
2024–25	AFC Champions League	Group B	(Thailand) College of Asian Scholars	2–1		2nd
2024–25	AFC Champions League	Quarter-finals	(South Korea) Incheon Red Angels	0–1		
2025–26	AFC Champions League	Group B	(India) East Bengal	1–3		4th
2025–26	AFC Champions League	Group B	(Uzbekistan) Nasaf	1–0		4th
2025–26	AFC Champions League	Group B	(China) Wuhan Jianghan	0–4		4th
2026–27	AFC Champions League	Group E	(Tajikistan) CSKA Dushanbe	3–0		1st
2026–27	AFC Champions League	Group E	(Saudi Arabia) Al Nassr	1–1		1st
2026–27	AFC Champions League	Group E	(Jordan) Etihad	3–1		1st
2026–27	AFC Champions League	Group A	(Japan) Kobe Leonessa	1–4		4th
2026–27	AFC Champions League	Group A	(North Korea) Naegohyang	1–6		4th
2026–27	AFC Champions League	Group A	(Myanmar) Ayeyawady	0–3		4th
