= Houshang Golmakani =

Iranian journalist, film critic and director

- هوشنگ گلمکانی
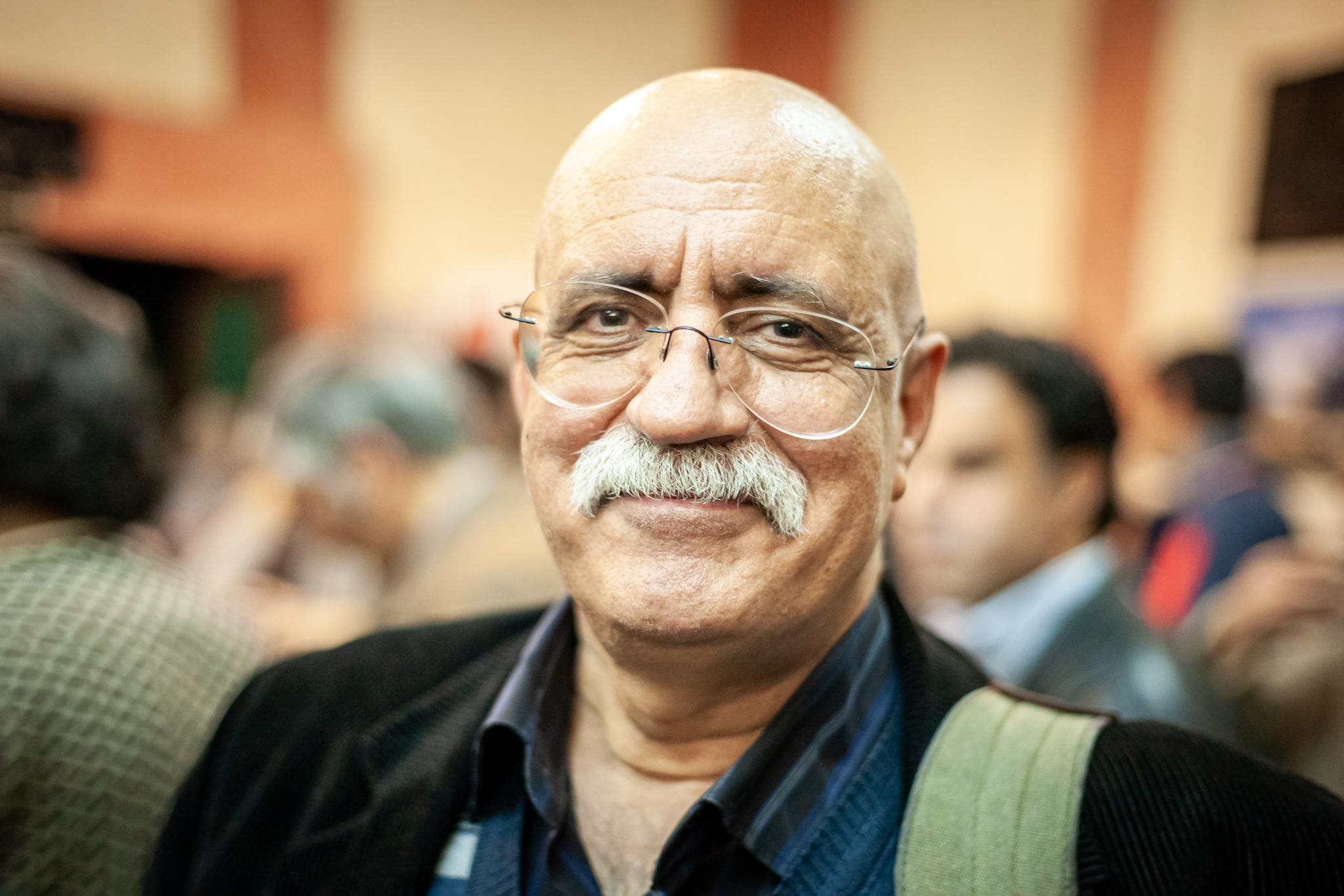
- Houshang Golmakani in 2018
- Born: March 23, 1954 (age 72); Gorgan, Iran
- Education: College of Dramatic Arts of Tehran
- Occupations: Journalist, film critic, director
- Years active: 1972–present
- Known for: Co-founder of Film (Iranian magazine)

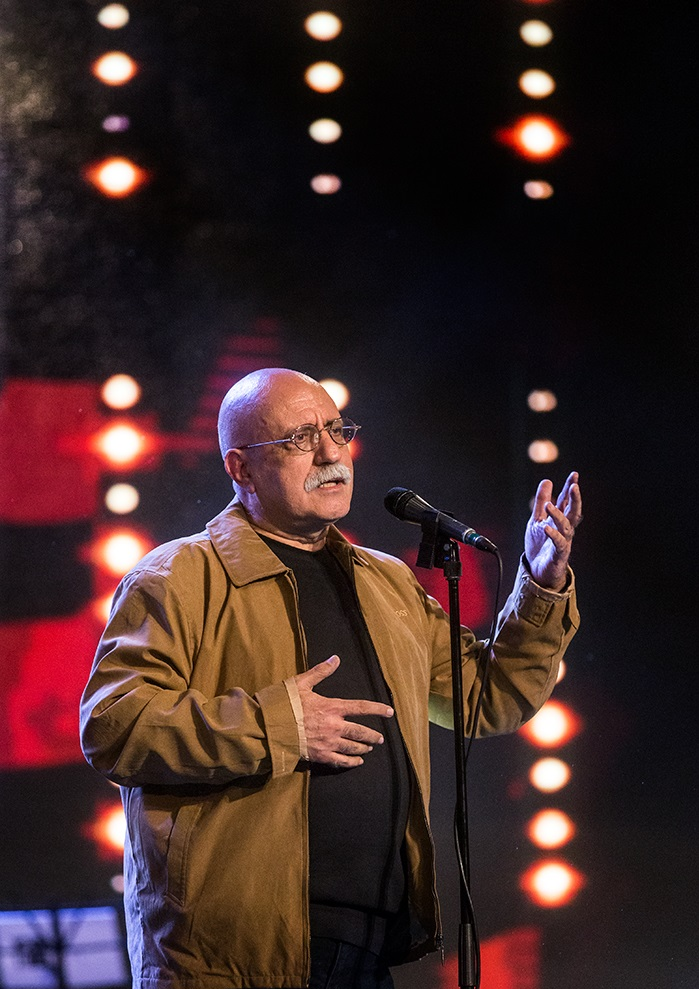
Houshang Golmakani in 2018

Houshang Golmakani is an Iranian journalist, film critic and director. He was born in Gorgan on March 23, 1954. Houshang Golmakani started his professional career in 1972 as a journalist and film critic for Tehran Economist. He graduated in cinema and television from the College of Dramatic Arts of Tehran in 1982.

He is one of the three founders of Film (Iranian magazine), the oldest post-revolutionary film magazine in Iran (founded in 1982 with Massoud Mehrabi and Abbas Yari). In 1993, Film (Iranian magazine) began to print an English version of the magazine for its international readers, FILM International, the only English magazine solely about Iranian cinema.

Houshang Golmakani is also a writer and a director. He directed a documentary about the life and works of Mohsen Makhmalbaf, STARDUST-STRICKEN; Mohsen Makhmalbaf: A Portrait (1996). He writes books about cinema and translate screenplays.

== Works ==
=== Translation of screenplays ===
Houshang Golmakani has translated over 14 screenplays including the following:

- Paris, Texas (1st edition: 1989; 2nd edition: 1997; 3rd edition: 2002)
- The White Sheik, Variety Lights (1992)
- La Strada (1995)
- La Notte (1997)
- Cinema Paradiso (1999)

=== Books/Other publications ===
- The Gentleman Actor (1st edition: 1997; 2nd edition: 2010)
- The Sound of Music (2000)
- From Sam Alley
- Tangna (Narrow), book (2007)
- Golmakani, Houshang (1992). "New times, same problems". Index on Censorship. 21 (3): 19–22. doi:10.1080/03064229208535304. S2CID 144499359.
- Golmakani, Houshang (2009). "Film in Iran: The Magazine and the Movies". Nieman Reports. 63 (2): 26–27. ISSN 0028-9817.

Houshang Golmakan was also the producer and director of the film Stardust Stricken, Mohsen Makhmalbaf: A Portrait in 1996.

== Contributions as a Jury ==
- Member of FIPRESCI jury at the Leipzig documentary film festival, 1998
- Member of jury at the Tbilissi film festival, 2007
- Member of NETPAC jury at Antalya film festival, 2007
- Member of jury at Didar film festival, Dushanbe, Tajikistan, 2008
- Member of NETPAC (Network for Promotion of Asian Cinema)
- Member of selection committee for foreign movies, International Fajr festival, Tehran, (1998–2002)
- Member of jury of the 32nd Fajr Film Festival, 2013
- Member of jury for a foreign film, Fajr International Festival, 2017
- Member of jury of the 2nd American Sheid Film Festival, 2017

== Awards ==
- Honorary Award, Cinema House Celebration, 2007
- Best Art Critics Award, Journalists Foundation, 2008
- Award for the Most Influential Critic of the last thirty years in Iran, Art Critics Association, 2008

== Notes ==
- Houshang Golmakani at IMDb
- Udden, James (2014). "The Other Film International". Film International. 12 (3): 96–105. doi:10.1386/fiin.12.3.96_1.
