= Noshur =

Noshur or Nashur (Persian: نشور), also rendered as Nowshur or Nushur, may refer to:

- Noshur-e Olya
- Noshur-e Sofla
- Noshur-e Vosta
