= Sad-e Gaveshan =

Sad-e Gaveshan سد گاوشان
- Village
- Country: Iran
- Province: Kurdistan
- County: Kamyaran
- Bakhsh: Muchesh
- Rural District: Sursur

Population (2006)
  - Total: 43
- Time zone: UTC+3:30 (IRST)
  - Summer (DST): UTC+4:30 (IRDT)

Sad-e Gaveshan (Persian: سد گاوشان, also Romanized as Sad-e Gāveshān) is a village in Sursur Rural District, Muchesh District, Kamyaran County, Kurdistan Province, Iran. At the 2006 census, its population was 43, in 15 families. The village is populated by Kurds.
