= Farsabad, Kurdistan =

Farsabad فارس آباد
- Village
- Location within Iran
- Coordinates: 34°59′44″N 46°47′20″E
- Country: Iran
- Province: Kurdistan
- County: Kamyaran
- Bakhsh: Muchesh
- Rural District: Gavrud

Population (2006)
  - Total: 645
- Time zone: UTC+3:30 (IRST)
  - Summer (DST): UTC+4:30 (IRDT)

Farsabad (Persian: فارس آباد, also Romanized as Fārsābād) is a village in Gavrud Rural District, Muchesh District, Kamyaran County, Kurdistan Province, Iran. At the 2006 census, its population was 645, in 147 families. The village is populated by Kurds.
