= Sarbenav =

Sarbenav سربناو
- Village
- Location within Iran
- Coordinates: 34°56′14″N 46°56′19″E
- Country: Iran
- Province: Kurdistan
- County: Kamyaran
- Bakhsh: Muchesh
- Rural District: Gavrud

Population (2006)
  - Total: 91
- Time zone: UTC+3:30 (IRST)
  - Summer (DST): UTC+4:30 (IRDT)

Sarbenav (Persian: سربناو, also Romanized as Sarbenāv) is a village in Gavrud Rural District, Muchesh District, Kamyaran County, Kurdistan Province, Iran. At the 2006 census, its population was 91, in 21 families. The village is populated by Kurds.
