= Kumain =

Kumain كومائين
- Village
- Location within Iran
- Coordinates: 34°57′18″N 47°11′54″E
- Country: Iran
- Province: Kurdistan
- County: Kamyaran
- Bakhsh: Muchesh
- Rural District: Sursur

Population (2006)
  - Total: 286
- Time zone: UTC+3:30 (IRST)
  - Summer (DST): UTC+4:30 (IRDT)

Kumain (Persian: كومائين, also Romanized as Kūmā'īn) is a village in Sursur Rural District, Muchesh District, Kamyaran County, Kurdistan Province, Iran. At the 2006 census, its population was 286, in 67 families. The village is populated by Kurds.
