= Samuridar =

Samuridar سموريدر
- Village
- Location within Iran
- Coordinates: 35°03′16″N 46°42′53″E
- Country: Iran
- Province: Kurdistan
- County: Kamyaran
- Bakhsh: Muchesh
- Rural District: Gavrud

Population (2006)
  - Total: 23
- Time zone: UTC+3:30 (IRST)
  - Summer (DST): UTC+4:30 (IRDT)

Samuridar (Kurdish: سموريدر, also Romanized as Samūrīdar; also known as Samūydar) is a village in Gavrud Rural District, Muchesh District, Kamyaran County, Kurdistan Province, Iran. At the 2006 census, its population was 23, in 5 families. The village is populated by Kurds.
