= Kani Gashah =

Kani Gashah كاني گشه
- Village
- Location within Iran
- Coordinates: 34°55′05″N 47°00′25″E
- Country: Iran
- Province: Kurdistan
- County: Kamyaran
- Bakhsh: Muchesh
- Rural District: Sursur

Population (2006)
  - Total: 86
- Time zone: UTC+3:30 (IRST)
  - Summer (DST): UTC+4:30 (IRDT)

Kani Gashah (Persian: كاني گشه, also Romanized as Kānī Gashah) is a village in Sursur Rural District, Muchesh District, Kamyaran County, Kurdistan Province, Iran. At the 2006 census its population was 86 in 17 families. The village is populated by Kurds.
