= Faqih Soleyman =

Faqih Soleyman فقيه سليمان
- Village
- Location within Iran
- Coordinates: 35°02′09″N 46°57′01″E
- Country: Iran
- Province: Kurdistan
- County: Kamyaran
- Bakhsh: Muchesh
- Rural District: Avalan

Population (2006)
  - Total: 41
- Time zone: UTC+3:30 (IRST)
  - Summer (DST): UTC+4:30 (IRDT)

Faqih Soleyman (Persian: فقيه سليمان, also Romanized as Faqīh Soleymān; also known as Faq-i-Sulaimān) is a village in Avalan Rural District, Muchesh District, Kamyaran County, Kurdistan Province, Iran. At the 2006 census, its population was 41, in 8 families. The village is populated by Kurds.
