= Bansaid =

Bansaid (Persian: بان سعيد) may refer to:

- Bansaid-e Olya
- Bansaid-e Sofla
