= Varmakan =

Varmakan ورمكان
- Village
- Location within Iran
- Coordinates: 35°01′21″N 47°15′14″E
- Country: Iran
- Province: Kurdistan
- County: Kamyaran
- Bakhsh: Muchesh
- Rural District: Amirabad

Population (2006)
  - Total: 183
- Time zone: UTC+3:30 (IRST)
  - Summer (DST): UTC+4:30 (IRDT)

Varmakan (Persian: ورمكان, also Romanized as Varmakān; also known as Warmaqān) is a village in Amirabad Rural District, Muchesh District, Kamyaran County, Kurdistan Province, Iran. At the 2006 census, its population was 183, in 44 families. The village is populated by Kurds.
