= Dirmuli =

Dirmuli ديرمولي
- Village
- Location within Iran
- Coordinates: 35°02′58″N 46°53′47″E
- Country: Iran
- Province: Kurdistan
- County: Kamyaran
- Bakhsh: Muchesh
- Rural District: Avalan

Population (2006)
  - Total: 100
- Time zone: UTC+3:30 (IRST)
  - Summer (DST): UTC+4:30 (IRDT)

Dirmuli (Persian: ديرمولي, also Romanized as Dīrmūlī; also known as Deh Mūlā) is a village in Avalan Rural District, Muchesh District, Kamyaran County, Kurdistan Province, Iran. At the 2006 census, its population was 100, in 31 families. The village is populated by Kurds.
