= Sar Panbeh Dul =

Village in Kurdistan, Iran

Sar Panbeh Dul سرپنبه دول
- Village
- Location within Iran
- Coordinates: 34°57′12″N 47°18′49″E
- Country: Iran
- Province: Kurdistan
- County: Kamyaran
- Bakhsh: Muchesh
- Rural District: Amirabad

Population (2006)
  - Total: 147
- Time zone: UTC+3:30 (IRST)
  - Summer (DST): UTC+4:30 (IRDT)

Sar Panbeh Dul (Persian: سرپنبه دول, also Romanized as Sar Panbeh Dūl) is a village in Amirabad Rural District, Muchesh District, Kamyaran County, Kurdistan Province, Iran. At the 2006 census, its population was 147, in 29 families. The village is populated by Kurds.
