= Eshkaftan =

Eshkaftan اشكفتان
- Village
- Location within Iran
- Coordinates: 35°07′35″N 47°11′32″E
- Country: Iran
- Province: Kurdistan
- County: Kamyaran
- Bakhsh: Muchesh
- Rural District: Amirabad

Population (2006)
  - Total: 192
- Time zone: UTC+3:30 (IRST)
  - Summer (DST): UTC+4:30 (IRDT)

Eshkaftan (Persian: اشكفتان, also Romanized as Eshkaftān and Ashkaftān; also known as Eshgaftān, Īskatun, and Shekaftān) is a village in Amirabad Rural District, Muchesh District, Kamyaran County, Kurdistan Province, Iran. At the 2006 census, its population was 192, in 55 families. The village is populated by Kurds.
