= Ramesht =

Ramesht رمشت
- Village
- Location within Iran
- Coordinates: 35°04′19″N 47°11′52″E
- Country: Iran
- Province: Kurdistan
- County: Kamyaran
- Bakhsh: Muchesh
- Rural District: Amirabad

Population (2006)
  - Total: 380
- Time zone: UTC+3:30 (IRST)
  - Summer (DST): UTC+4:30 (IRDT)

Ramesht (Persian: رمشت; also known as Ramīsht) is a village in Amirabad Rural District, Muchesh District, Kamyaran County, Kurdistan Province, Iran. At the 2006 census, its population was 380, in 96 families. The village is populated by Kurds.
