= Pir Meqdar =

Pir Meqdar پيرمقدار
- Village
- Location within Iran
- Coordinates: 34°58′35″N 47°03′26″E
- Country: Iran
- Province: Kurdistan
- County: Kamyaran
- Bakhsh: Muchesh
- Rural District: Sursur

Population (2006)
  - Total: 179
- Time zone: UTC+3:30 (IRST)
  - Summer (DST): UTC+4:30 (IRDT)

Pir Meqdar (Persian: پيرمقدار, also Romanized as Pīr Meqdār; also known as Pīr Meqdād) is a village in Sursur Rural District, Muchesh District, Kamyaran County, Kurdistan Province, Iran. At the 2006 census, its population was 179, in 46 families. The village is populated by Kurds.
