= Bakhorram-e Olya =

Bakhorram-e Olya باخرم عليا
- Village
- Location within Iran
- Coordinates: 34°56′57″N 47°09′24″E
- Country: Iran
- Province: Kurdistan
- County: Kamyaran
- Bakhsh: Muchesh
- Rural District: Sursur

Population (2006)
  - Total: 216
- Time zone: UTC+3:30 (IRST)
  - Summer (DST): UTC+4:30 (IRDT)

Bakhorram-e Olya (Persian: باخرم عليا, also Romanized as Bākhorram-e ‘Olyā; also known as Bākhorram) is a village in Sursur Rural District, Muchesh District, Kamyaran County, Kurdistan Province, Iran. At the 2006 census, its population was 216, in 43 families. The village is populated by Kurds.
