= Yaminan =

Yaminan (Persian: يمينان), also rendered as Yamanan or Yamnan, may refer to:

- Yaminan-e Olya
- Yaminan-e Sofla
