= Hendiman =

Hendiman هنديمن
- Village
- Location within Iran
- Coordinates: 34°59′51″N 46°47′27″E
- Country: Iran
- Province: Kurdistan
- County: Kamyaran
- Bakhsh: Muchesh
- Rural District: Gavrud

Population (2006)
  - Total: 635
- Time zone: UTC+3:30 (IRST)
  - Summer (DST): UTC+4:30 (IRDT)

Hendiman (Persian: هنديمن, also Romanized as Hendīman) is a village in Gavrud Rural District, Muchesh District, Kamyaran County, Kurdistan Province, Iran. At the 2006 census, its population was 635, in 151 families. The village is populated by Kurds.
