= Pir Bagh =

Village in Kurdistan, Iran

Pir Bagh پيرباغ
- Village
- Location within Iran
- Coordinates: 35°02′59″N 46°43′00″E
- Country: Iran
- Province: Kurdistan
- County: Kamyaran
- Bakhsh: Muchesh
- Rural District: Gavrud

Population (2006)
  - Total: 29
- Time zone: UTC+3:30 (IRST)
  - Summer (DST): UTC+4:30 (IRDT)

Pir Bagh (Persian: پيرباغ, also Romanized as Pīr Bāgh) is a village in Gavrud Rural District, Muchesh District, Kamyaran County, Kurdistan Province, Iran. At the 2006 census, its population was 29, in 7 families. The village is populated by Kurds.
