= Vazmaneh-ye Olya =

Vazmaneh-ye Olya وزمانه عليا
- Village
- Location within Iran
- Coordinates: 34°54′42″N 47°00′44″E
- Country: Iran
- Province: Kurdistan
- County: Kamyaran
- Bakhsh: Muchesh
- Rural District: Sursur

Population (2006)
  - Total: 86
- Time zone: UTC+3:30 (IRST)
  - Summer (DST): UTC+4:30 (IRDT)

Vazmaneh-ye Olya (Persian: وزمانه عليا, also Romanized as Vazmāneh-ye ‘Olyā and Vezmāneh-ye ‘Olyā; also known as Ozmāneh-ye ‘Olyā, Uzmāneh, Uzmāneh ‘Uliya, Vazmāneh-ye Bālā, and Vezmāneh) is a village in Sursur Rural District, Muchesh District, Kamyaran County, Kurdistan Province, Iran. At the 2006 census, its population was 86, in 19 families. The village is populated by Kurds.
