= Gaveshan =

Gaveshan گاوشان
- Village
- Location within Iran
- Coordinates: 34°59′05″N 46°59′11″E
- Country: Iran
- Province: Kurdistan
- County: Kamyaran
- Bakhsh: Muchesh
- Rural District: Sursur

Population (2006)
  - Total: 339
- Time zone: UTC+3:30 (IRST)
  - Summer (DST): UTC+4:30 (IRDT)

Gaveshan (Persian: گاوشان, also Romanized as Gāveshān; also known as Kāveshān) is a village in Sursur Rural District, Muchesh District, Kamyaran County, Kurdistan Province, Iran. At the 2006 census, its population was 339, in 84 families. The village is populated by Kurds.
