= Kuhik =

Kuhik (Persian: كوهيك) may refer to:

- Kuhik, Amirabad
- Kuhik, Avalan
