= Taineh =

Taineh طاينه
- Village
- Location within Iran
- Coordinates: 34°57′54″N 46°56′32″E
- Country: Iran
- Province: Kurdistan
- County: Kamyaran
- Bakhsh: Muchesh
- Rural District: Avalan

Population (2006)
  - Total: 264
- Time zone: UTC+3:30 (IRST)
  - Summer (DST): UTC+4:30 (IRDT)

Taineh (Persian: طاينه, also Romanized as Ţāīneh and Tā'īneh) is a village in Avalan Rural District, Muchesh District, Kamyaran County, Kurdistan Province, Iran. At the 2006 census, its population was 264, in 52 families. The village is populated by Kurds.
