= Mehrabi =

Mehrabi (Persian: مهرابی or محرابی) is a toponym and a Persian habitational surname for a person from one of two Iranian villages named Mehrab. It is also a common last name in Afghanistan. It may refer to:

- Kalareh-ye Mehrabi, a village in Kermanshah Province, Iran
- Tolombeh-ye Fathabad-e Mehrabi, a village in Kerman Province, Iran

== People with the surname ==
- Ehsan Mehrabi (born 1978), Iranian journalist
- Kaveh Mehrabi (born 1982), Iranian badminton player
- Massoud Mehrabi (1954–2020), Iranian journalist, writer and caricaturist
- Zahra Mehrabi (1965–2011), dual Dutch and Iranian citizen who was executed in Iran for drug trafficking

== See also ==
- Mehrab (disambiguation)
- Mihrab
