= Mahmud Gazag =

Mahmud Gazag محمودگزگ
- Village
- Location within Iran
- Coordinates: 34°56′05″N 47°16′33″E
- Country: Iran
- Province: Kurdistan
- County: Kamyaran
- Bakhsh: Muchesh
- Rural District: Amirabad

Population (2006)
  - Total: 248
- Time zone: UTC+3:30 (IRST)
  - Summer (DST): UTC+4:30 (IRDT)

Mahmud Gazag (Persian: محمودگزگ, also Romanized as Maḩmūd Gazag; also known as Maḩmūd Gazak) is a village in Amirabad Rural District, Muchesh District, Kamyaran County, Kurdistan Province, Iran. At the 2006 census, its population was 248, in 53 families. The village is populated by Kurds.
