= Niyar, Kurdistan =

Niyar نير
- Village
- Location within Iran
- Coordinates: 35°06′19″N 46°43′23″E
- Country: Iran
- Province: Kurdistan
- County: Kamyaran
- Bakhsh: Muchesh
- Rural District: Gavrud

Population (2006)
  - Total: 1,365
- Time zone: UTC+3:30 (IRST)
  - Summer (DST): UTC+4:30 (IRDT)

Niyar (Persian: نير, also Romanized as Nīyar, Nayyer, Neyar, and Neyer; also known as Nīāz and Nīmār) is a village in Gavrud Rural District, Muchesh District, Kamyaran County, Kurdistan Province, Iran. At the 2006 census, its population was 1,365, in 326 families. The village is populated by Kurds.
