= Khamesan =

Village in Kurdistan province, Iran

Khamesan Persian: خامسان
- Village
- Location within Iran Location within Iran Kurdistan
- Coordinates: 34°59′01″N 47°05′37″E
- Country: Iran
- Province: Kurdistan
- County: Kamyaran
- District: Muchesh
- Rural District: Sursur

Population (2016)
  - Total: 1,405
- Time zone: UTC+3:30 (IRST)

Khamesan (Persian: خامسان) (Note: Also romanized as Khāmesān and Khamsān) is a village in Sursur Rural District of Muchesh District, Kamyaran County, Kurdistan province, Iran.

== Demographics ==
=== Ethnicity ===
The village is populated by Kurds.

=== Population ===
At the time of the 2006 National Census, the village's population was 1,901 in 456 households. The following census in 2011 counted 1,589 people in 487 households. The 2016 census measured the population of the village as 1,405 people in 448 households. It was the most populous village in its rural district.
