= Noshur-e Vosta =

Noshur-e Vosta نشوروسطي
- Village
- Location within Iran
- Coordinates: 35°01′52″N 46°55′17″E
- Country: Iran
- Province: Kurdistan
- County: Kamyaran
- Bakhsh: Muchesh
- Rural District: Avalan

Population (2006)
  - Total: 363
- Time zone: UTC+3:30 (IRST)
  - Summer (DST): UTC+4:30 (IRDT)

Noshur-e Vosta (Persian: نشوروسطي, also Romanized as Noshūr-e Vosţá; also known as Nūshūr and Tappeh) is a village in Avalan Rural District, Muchesh District, Kamyaran County, Kurdistan Province, Iran. At the 2006 census, its population was 363, in 84 families. The village is populated by Kurds.
