= Bansaid-e Olya =

Village in Kurdistan, Iran

Bansaid-e Olya بان سعيدعليا
- Village
- Location within Iran
- Coordinates: 34°55′46″N 47°07′34″E
- Country: Iran
- Province: Kurdistan
- County: Kamyaran
- Bakhsh: Muchesh
- Rural District: Sursur

Population (2006)
  - Total: 181
- Time zone: UTC+3:30 (IRST)
  - Summer (DST): UTC+4:30 (IRDT)

Bansaid-e Olya (Persian: بان سعيدعليا, also Romanized as Bānsa‘īd-e ‘Olyā) is a village in Sursur Rural District, Muchesh District, Kamyaran County, Kurdistan Province, Iran. At the 2006 census, its population was 181, in 45 families. The village is populated by Kurds.
