= Kuleh Sareh =

Village in Kurdistan province, Iran

Kuleh Sareh Persian: كوله ساره
- Village
- Location within Iran Location within Iran Kurdistan
- Coordinates: 34°57′15″N 46°52′38″E
- Country: Iran
- Province: Kurdistan
- County: Kamyaran
- District: Muchesh
- Rural District: Gavrud

Population (2016)
  - Total: 1,487
- Time zone: UTC+3:30 (IRST)

Kuleh Sareh (Persian: كوله ساره) (Note: Also romanized as Kūleh Sāreh) is a village in, and the capital of, Gavrud Rural District, Muchesh District, Kamyaran County, Kurdistan province, Iran.

== Demographics ==
=== Ethnicity ===
The village is populated by Kurds.

=== Population ===
At the time of the 2006 National Census, the village's population was 1,365 in 310 households. The following census in 2011 counted 1,521 people in 387 households. The 2016 census measured the population of the village as 1,487 people in 428 households.
