= Niyar =

Niyar or Neyar or Niar or Nayyer or Neyer (Persian: نيار) may refer to:

- Niyar, Ardabil
- Niyar, Hamadan
- Niyar, Kurdistan
- Niyar, South Khorasan
- Jerry Neyer, American politician
