= Noshur-e Olya =

Noshur-e Olya نشورعليا
- Village
- Location within Iran
- Coordinates: 35°01′15″N 46°54′46″E
- Country: Iran
- Province: Kurdistan
- County: Kamyaran
- Bakhsh: Muchesh
- Rural District: Avalan

Population (2006)
  - Total: 129
- Time zone: UTC+3:30 (IRST)
  - Summer (DST): UTC+4:30 (IRDT)

Noshur-e Olya (Persian: نشورعليا, also Romanized as Noshūr-e ‘Olyā; also known as Nāshūr, Noshūr, Nowshūr, and Nushur) is a village in Avalan Rural District, Muchesh District, Kamyaran County, Kurdistan Province, Iran. At the 2006 census, its population was 129, in 28 families. The village is populated by Kurds.
