= Mehrab, Kurdistan =

Mehrab محراب
- Village
- Location within Iran
- Coordinates: 35°05′48″N 46°44′29″E
- Country: Iran
- Province: Kurdistan
- County: Kamyaran
- Bakhsh: Muchesh
- Rural District: Gavrud

Population (2006)
  - Total: 1,192
- Time zone: UTC+3:30 (IRST)
  - Summer (DST): UTC+4:30 (IRDT)

Mehrab (Persian: محراب, also Romanized as Meḩrāb and Mehrāb; also known as Mirab) is a village in Gavrud Rural District, Muchesh District, Kamyaran County, Kurdistan Province, Iran. At the 2006 census, its population was 1,192, in 265 families. The village is populated by Kurds.
