= List of films voted the best =

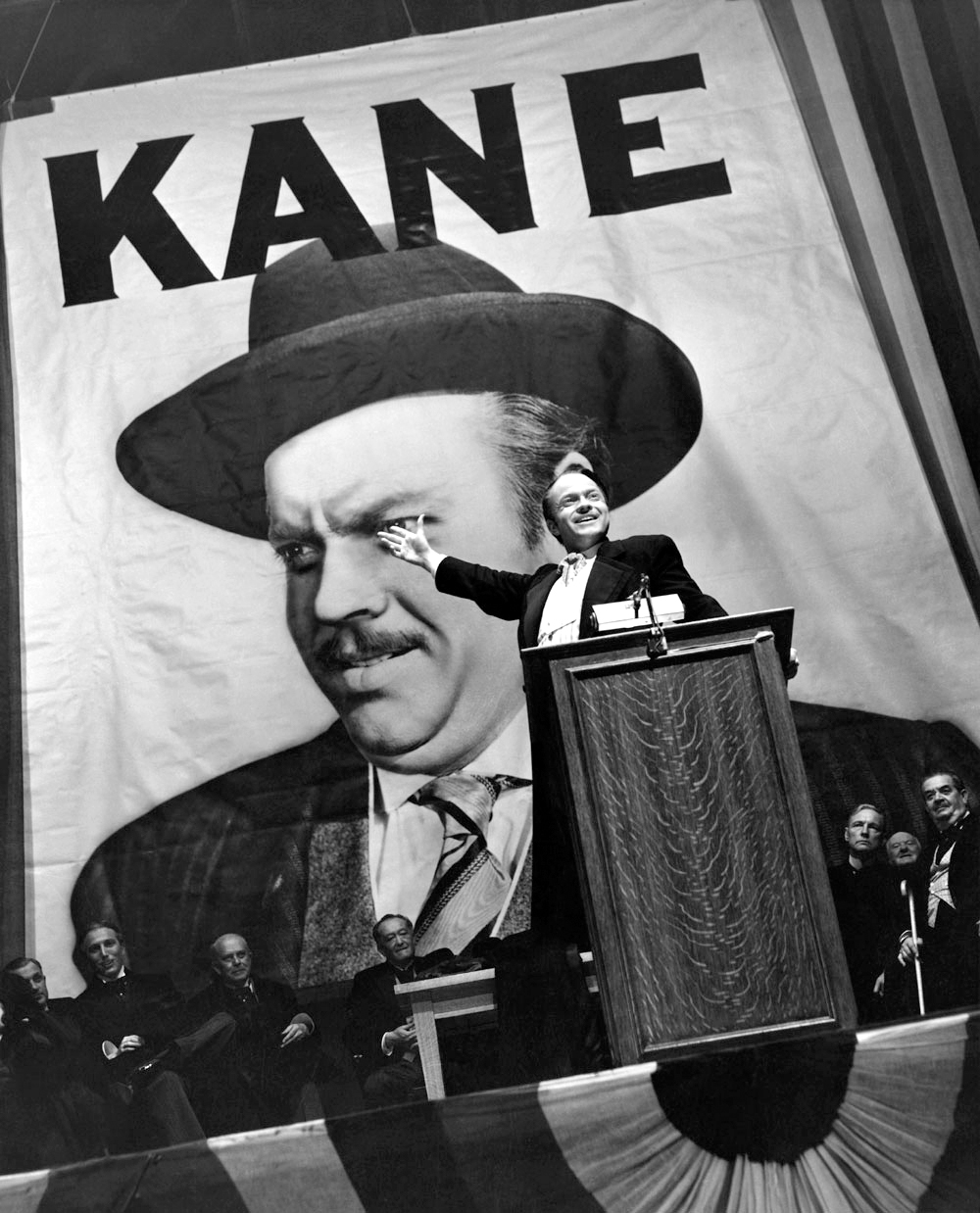
Citizen Kane (1941), starring and directed by Orson Welles, has topped several international polls, including five consecutive decades at number 1 in the British Film Institute's Sight and Sound decennial poll of critics.

The following films have been voted the best in national and international surveys of critics and the public. Some surveys focus on all films, while others focus on a particular genre or country. Voting systems differ, and some surveys suffer from biases such as self-selection or skewed demographics, while others may be susceptible to forms of interference such as vote stacking.

== Critics and filmmakers ==
=== Sight and Sound ===
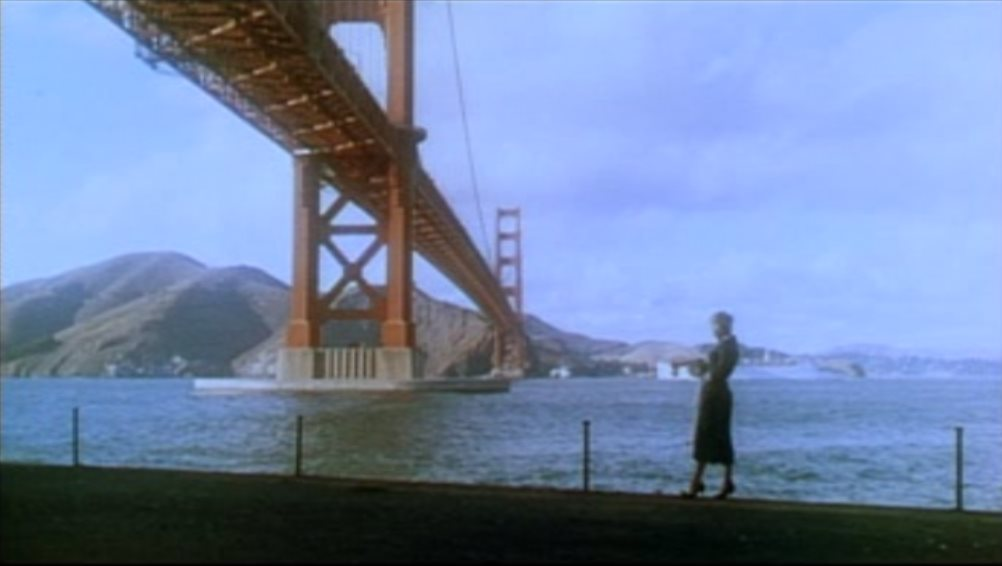
Vertigo (1958) was ranked number one in the 2012 British Film Institute's Sight and Sound decennial poll of critics and number two in their 2022 poll.

Every decade, starting in 1952, the British film magazine Sight and Sound asks an international group of film critics to vote for the greatest film of all time. Since 1992, they have invited directors to vote in a separate poll. Sixty-three critics participated in 1952, 70 critics in 1962, 89 critics in 1972, 122 critics in 1982, 132 critics and 101 directors in 1992, 145 critics and 108 directors in 2002, 846 critics and 358 directors in 2012, and 1639 critics and 480 directors in 2022.

This poll is regarded as one of the most important "greatest ever film" lists. The American critic Roger Ebert described it as "by far the most respected of the countless polls of great movies—the only one most serious movie people take seriously".

- Bicycle Thieves (1948) topped the first poll in 1952 with 25 votes.
- Citizen Kane (1941) stood at number 1 for five consecutive polls, with 22 votes in 1962, 32 votes in 1972, 45 votes in 1982, 43 votes in 1992, and 46 votes in 2002. It also topped the first two directors' polls, with 30 votes in 1992 and 42 votes in 2002.
- Vertigo (1958) topped the critics' poll in 2012 with 191 votes, dethroning Citizen Kane.
- Tokyo Story (1953) topped the directors' poll in 2012 with 48 votes, also dethroning Citizen Kane.
- Jeanne Dielman, 23 quai du Commerce, 1080 Bruxelles (1975) topped the critics' poll in 2022.
- 2001: A Space Odyssey (1968) topped the directors' poll in 2022.

=== Other polls ===
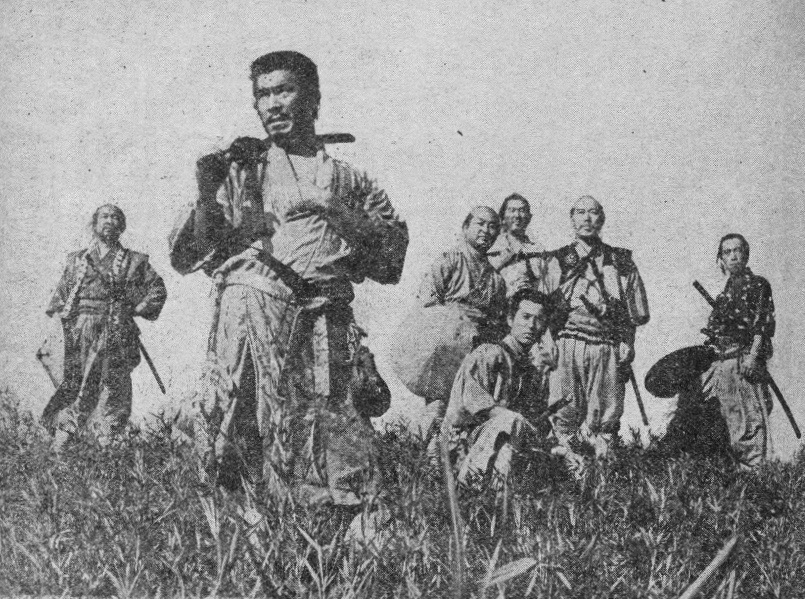
Seven Samurai (1954) topped the BBC poll of best foreign-language films as well as several Japanese polls.

- Battleship Potemkin (1925) was ranked number 1 with 32 votes when the Festival Mondial du Film et des Beaux-Arts de Belgique asked 63 film professionals around the world, mostly directors, to vote for the best films of the half-century in 1951. It was also ranked number 1 when the Brussels World's Fair polled 117 experts from 26 countries in 1958.
- Citizen Kane (1941) was ranked number 1 with 48 votes when French film magazine Cahiers du cinéma asked 78 French critics and historians to vote for the best films in 2007. It was also ranked number 1 with 48 votes when Chinese website Cinephilia.net asked 135 Chinese-speaking critics, scholars, curators, and cultural workers to vote for the best films in 2012. It was ranked number 1 with 49 votes when Spanish film magazine Nickel Odeon asked 150 Spanish film experts to vote for the best films in 1999.
- Seven Samurai (1954) was voted the greatest foreign-language (non-English) film in BBC's 2018 poll of 209 critics in 43 countries.
- Vertigo (1958) was ranked number 1 with 39 votes when German film magazine Steadycam asked 174 critics and filmmakers to vote for their favorite films in 2007. It was also ranked number 1 with 25 votes when Iranian film magazine Film asked 92 Iranian critics to vote for the best films in 2009. It topped also the Télérama poll in 2018.
- 8½ (1963) was voted the best foreign (i.e. non-Swedish) sound film with 21 votes in a 1964 poll of 50 Swedish film professionals organized by Swedish film magazine Chaplin. It was also ranked number 1 when the Museum of Cinematography in Łódź asked 279 Polish film professionals (filmmakers, critics, and professors) to vote for the best films in 2015.
- Gone with the Wind (1939) was selected as the greatest film of the past half-century in a 1950 poll conducted by Variety of more than 200 professionals who worked in the film industry for over 25 years.
- The Godfather (1972) was ranked number 1 when Japanese film magazine Kinema Junpo asked 114 Japanese critics and film professionals to vote for the best foreign (i.e. non-Japanese) films in 2009. It was also voted the greatest film in a Hollywood Reporter poll of 2120 industry members, including every studio, agency, publicity firm and production house in Hollywood in 2014.
- Boyz n the Hood (1991) topped the "Top Black Films of All Time" poll from the November 1998 edition of Ebony magazine.
- The Piano (1993) was voted the best film made by a female director in a 2019 BBC poll of 368 film experts from 84 countries.

== Audience polls ==
- Gone with the Wind (1939) was voted the favorite film of Americans in a poll of 2,279 adults taken by Harris Interactive in 2008, and again in a follow-up poll of 2,276 adults in 2014.
- Roman Holiday (1953) was voted the best foreign (i.e. non-Japanese) film of all time in a 1990 poll of about a million people organized by Japanese public broadcaster NHK.
- The Godfather (1972) was voted number 1 by Entertainment Weekly's readers in 1999 and voted as number 1 in a Time Out readers' poll in 1998. The film was voted the "Greatest Movie of All Time" in September 2008 by 10,000 readers of Empire magazine, 150 people from the movie business, and 50 film critics. It also topped Empire's June 2017 poll of 20,000 readers.
- The Empire Strikes Back (1980) was voted the best film of all time by over 250,000 readers of the Empire film magazine in 2015.
- Himala (Miracle, 1982) won the 2008 CNN Asia Pacific Screen Awards Viewers Choice as "Best Asia-Pacific Film of All Time" (voted for by thousands of film fans around the world).
- The Shawshank Redemption (1994) was voted the greatest film of all time by Empire readers in "The 201 Greatest Movies of All Time" poll taken in March 2006.
- Titanic (1997) was voted the greatest hit of all time in a poll of 6,000 movie fans conducted by English-language newspaper China Daily in March 2008.
- Shiri (1999) was voted the favorite film of South Koreans with 11,918 votes in a 2002 online poll of 54,013 people conducted by South Korean movie channel Orion Cinema Network.
- The Lord of the Rings trilogy (2001–2003)—despite being a series of three films—was voted the favorite "film" of Australians in an audience poll for the Australian television special My Favourite Film in 2005. It was also voted the best film in a poll of 120,000 German voters for the TV special Die besten Filme aller Zeiten ("The best films of all time") in 2004.

== Genres or media ==
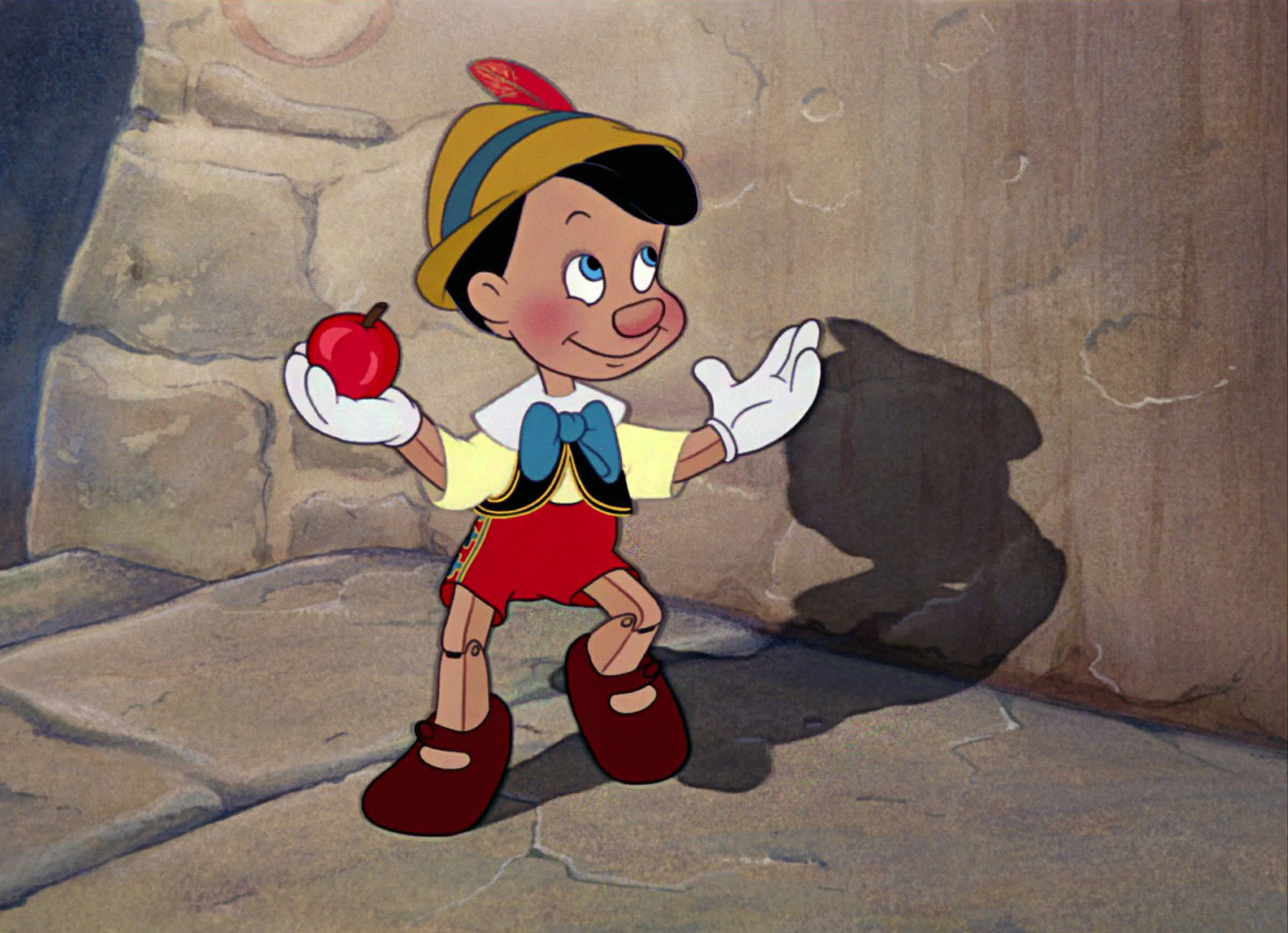
Pinocchio (1940) was voted the best animated film in a 2014 poll conducted by Time Out.

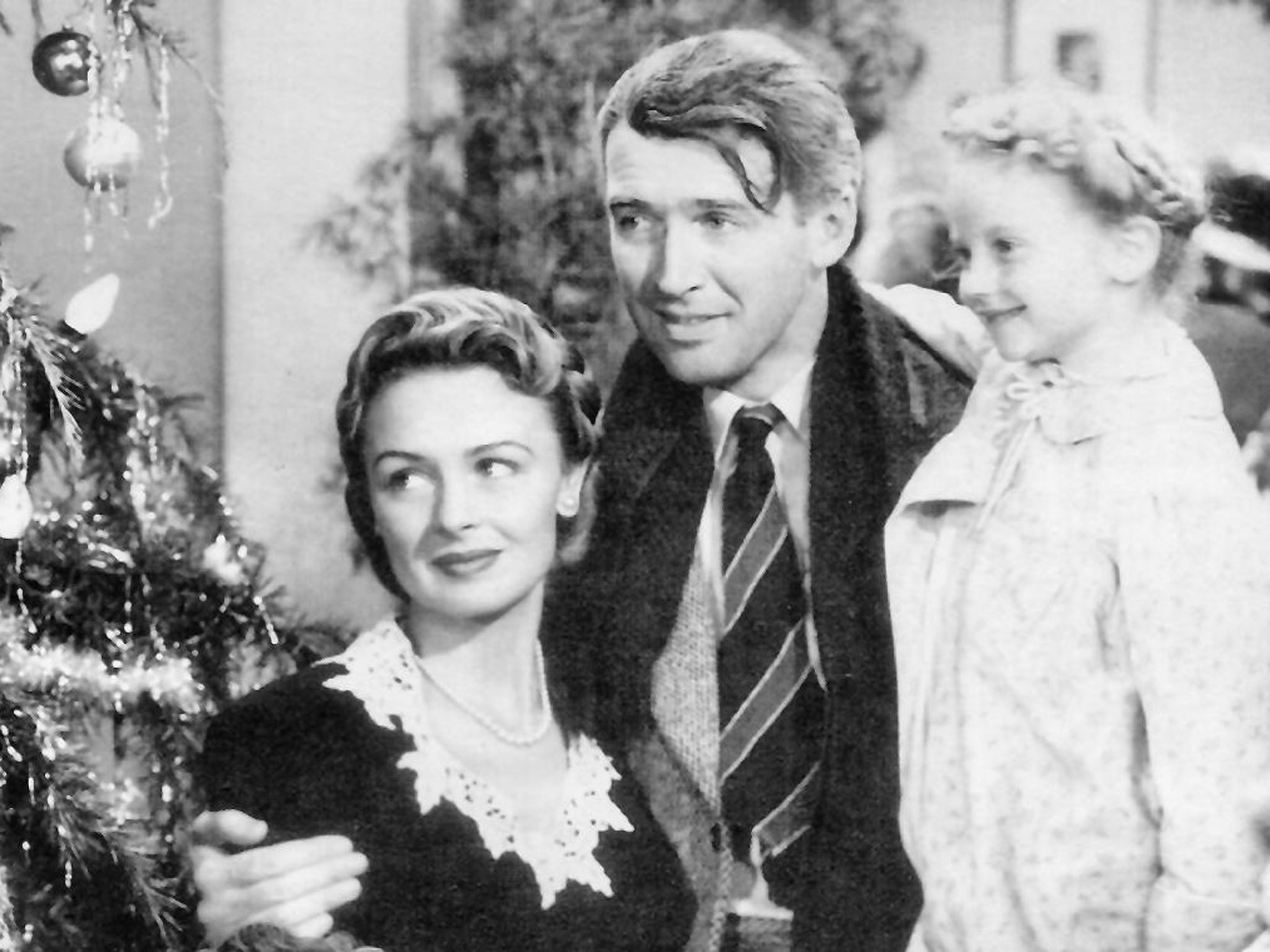
It's a Wonderful Life (1946) was voted the best Christmas film by an audience poll conducted by Axios and SurveyMonkey in 2018.

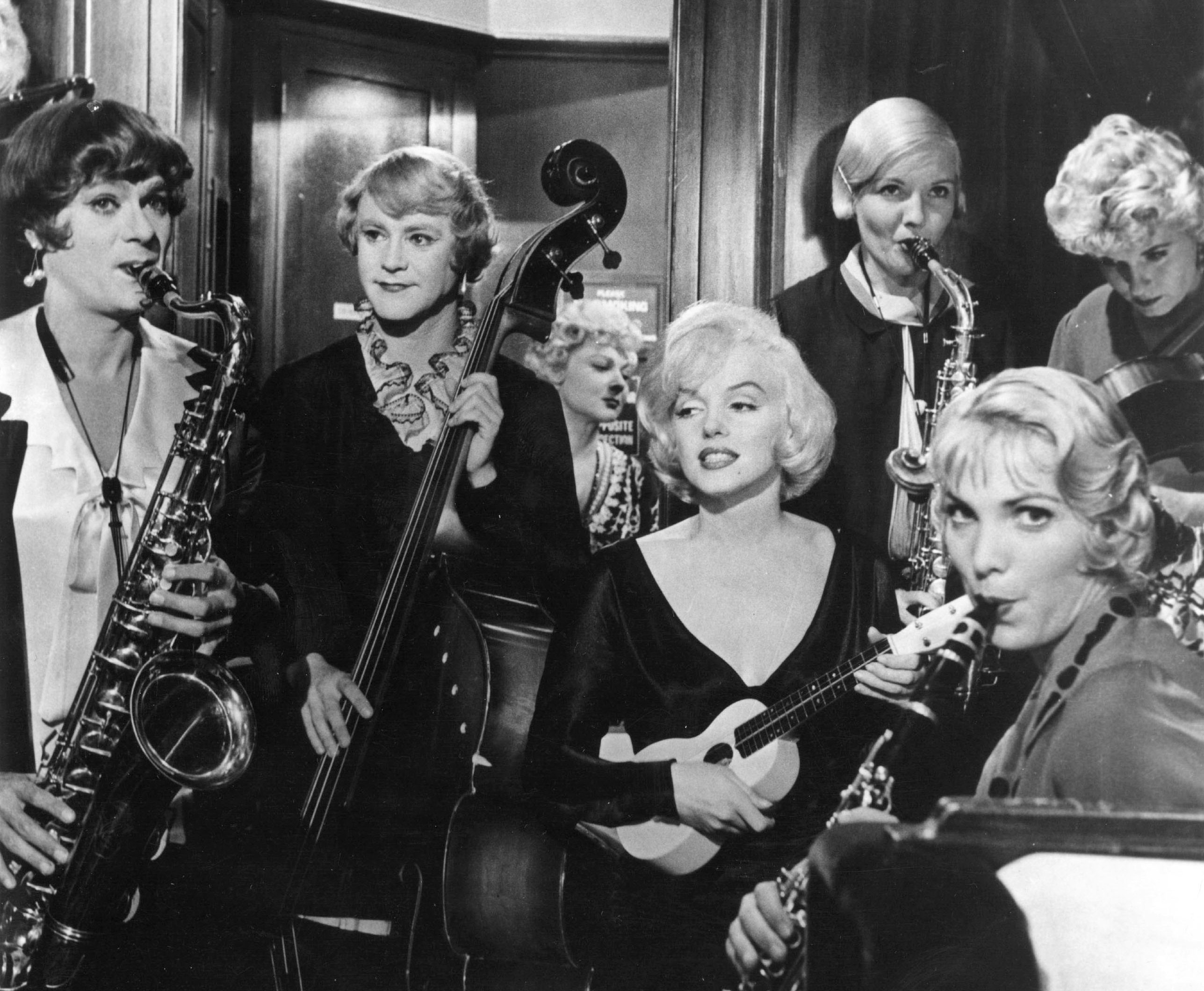
Some Like It Hot (1959) was critics' choice in BBC's 2017 poll for best comedy.

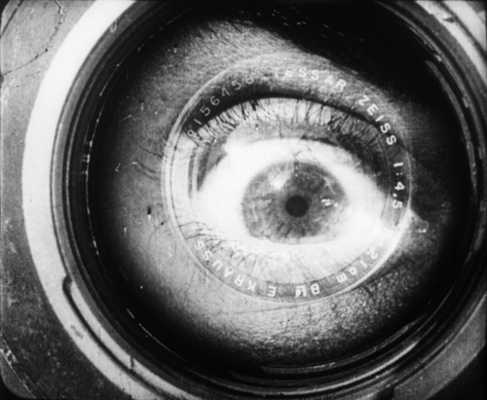
Man with a Movie Camera (1929) topped 2014 Sight and Sound poll of experts.

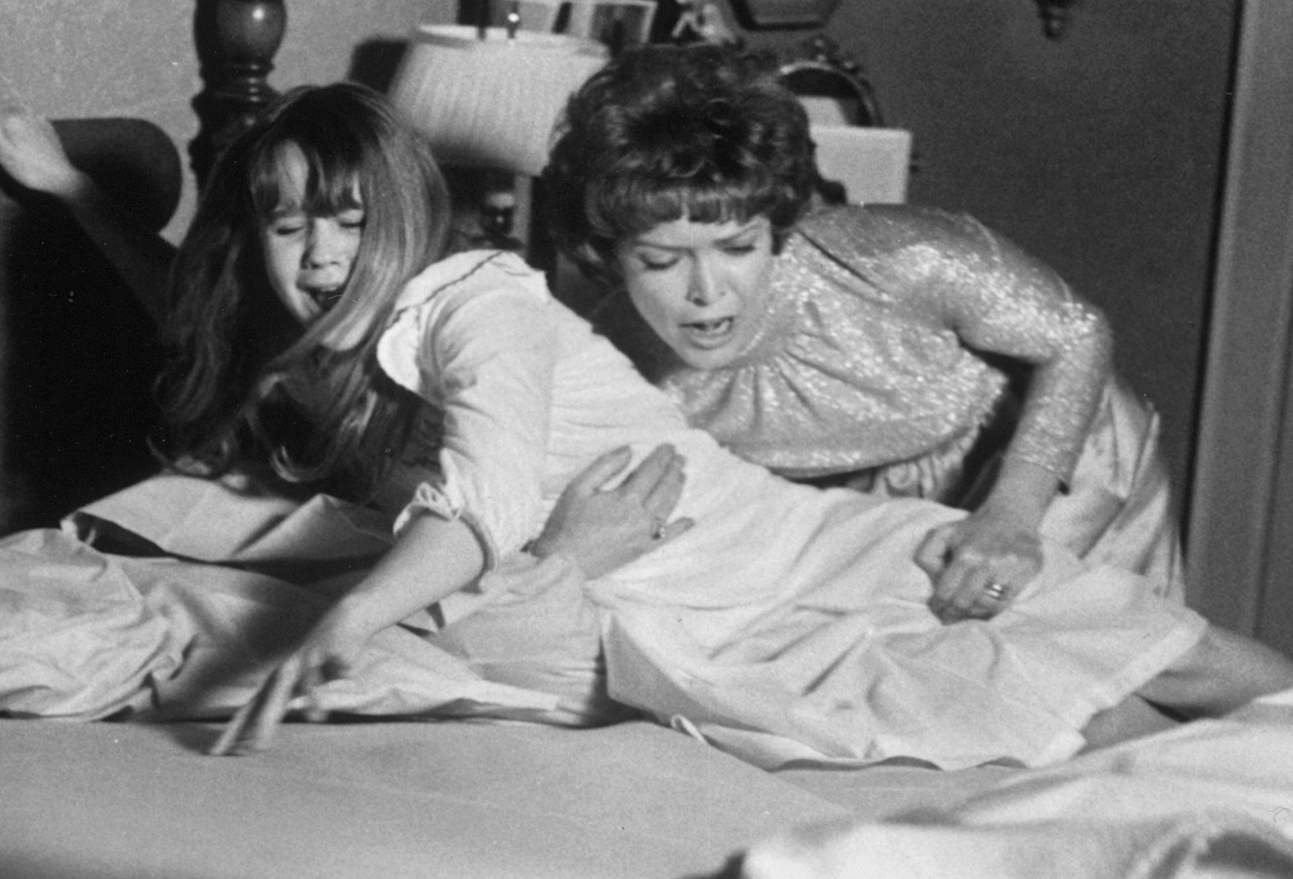
The Exorcist (1973) was voted the best horror film of all time in several polls.

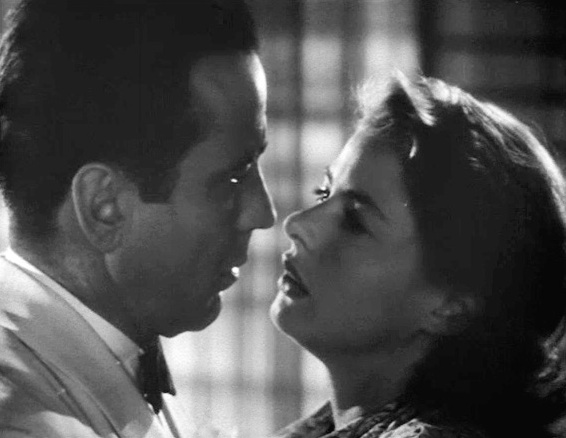
Casablanca (1942) was voted the best romance film in a 1996 poll organized by the Spanish film magazine Nickel Odeon.

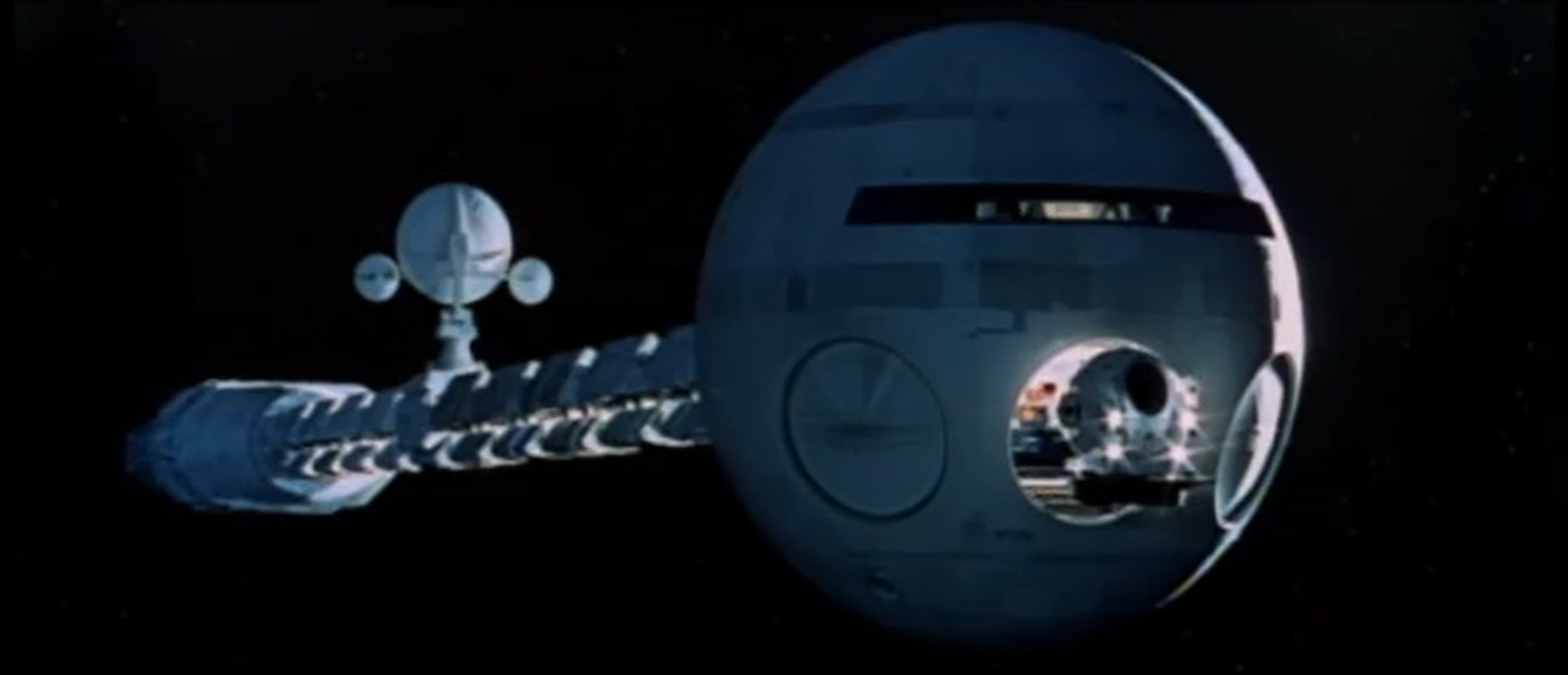
2001: A Space Odyssey (1968) has been frequently cited and voted as the best science fiction film of all time.

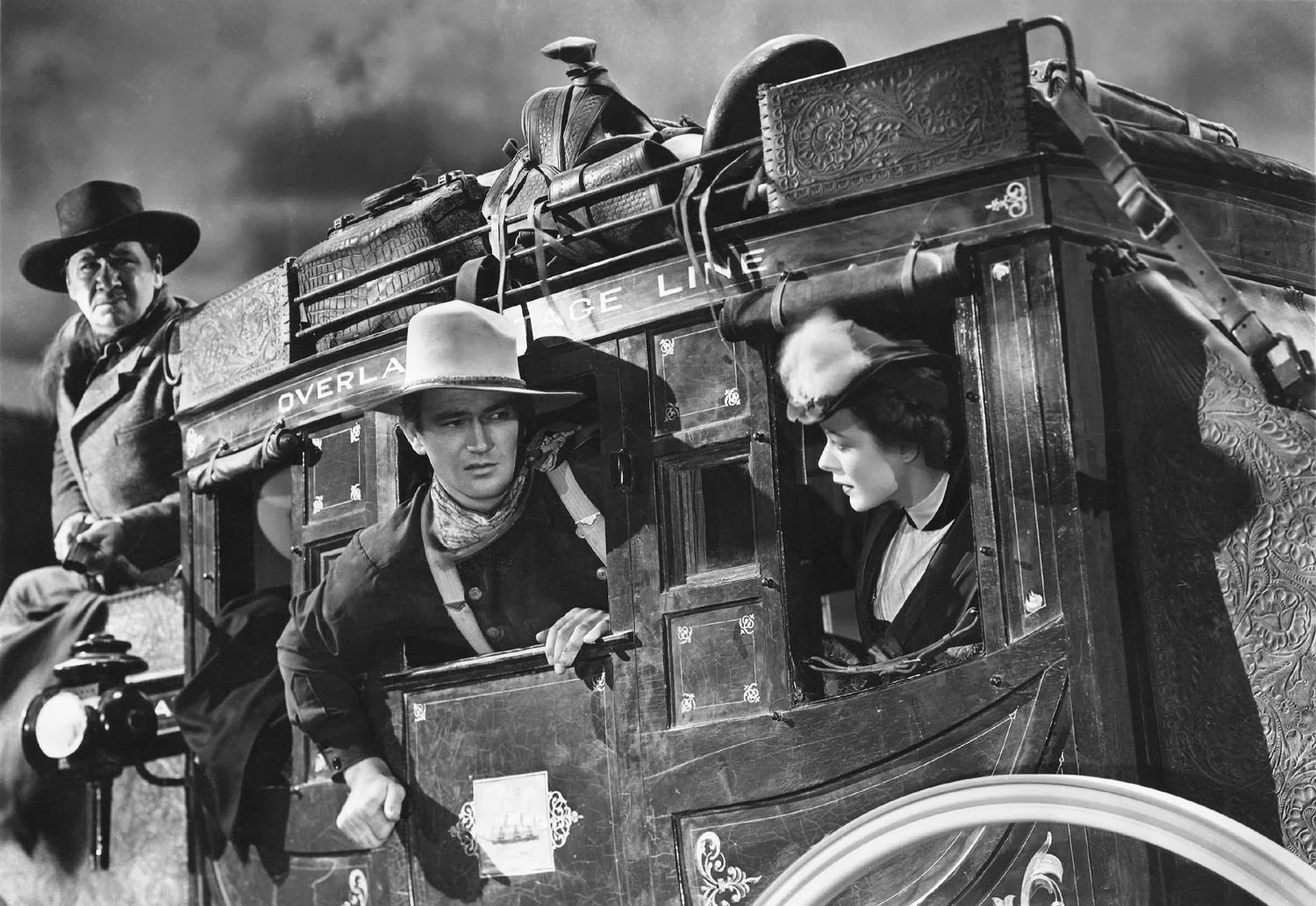
Stagecoach (1939) was voted the best Western film in a 1996 poll organized by the Spanish film magazine Nickel Odeon.

=== Action ===
- Mad Max 2 (1981) was voted the greatest action film of all time in a readers' poll by American magazine Rolling Stone in 2015.
- Die Hard (1988) was voted the best action film of all time with 21 votes in a 2014 poll of 50 directors, actors, critics, and experts conducted by Time Out New York.

=== Animation (shorts and features) ===
- Pinocchio (1940) was voted the best animated movie ever made in a 2014 poll of animators, filmmakers, critics, journalists, and experts conducted by Time Out.
- What's Opera, Doc? (1957), a Bugs Bunny cartoon, was selected as the greatest animated short film of all time by 1,000 animation professionals in the 1994 book The 50 Greatest Cartoons.
- Hedgehog in the Fog (1975) was ranked number 1 in a poll at the 2003 Laputa Animation Festival where 140 animators from around the world voted for the best animated films of all time.
- Tale of Tales (1979) was ranked number 1 with 17 votes in a poll at the Olympiad of Animation in 1984 where an international panel of 35 journalists, scholars, festival directors, and animation programmers voted for the best animated films. It was also ranked number 1 in a poll organized by the Channel 4 animation magazine Dope Sheet in 1997, as well as a poll organized by the Zagreb International Animation Festival, which announced the results in 2002.
- Nausicaä of the Valley of the Wind (1984) was the highest-ranking film in a 2006 poll of the greatest animations conducted at the Japan Media Arts Festival, voted by 80,000 attendees.
- Castle in the Sky (1986) was voted first place in a 2008 animation audience poll conducted by Oricon in Japan.
- Toy Story (1995) was voted number 1 on the "Top 100 Animated Features of All Time" list by the Online Film Critics Society (published March 2003). Voters chose from a reminder list of more than 350 films. It also topped a poll of 4,000 film fans for "greatest animated film of all time" in 2009, when it was re-released in 3D.

=== Christmas ===
- It's a Wonderful Life (1946) was voted the greatest Christmas film by an audience poll conducted by Axios and SurveyMonkey in 2018.
- Die Hard (1988) was voted the greatest Christmas movie by British film magazine Empire readers in 2015.

=== Comedy ===
- Some Like It Hot (1959) was voted the best comedy film of all time in a poll of 253 film critics from 52 countries conducted by the BBC in 2017.
- Blazing Saddles (1974) was voted the funniest movie of all time in a 2014 readers' poll by American magazine Rolling Stone.
- Monty Python's Life of Brian (1979) was voted the greatest comedy of all time in a poll of over 22,000 people conducted by the British TV network Channel 4 in 2006. It was also voted the greatest comedy film in polls conducted by British film magazine Total Film in 2000, and British newspaper The Guardian in 2007.
- Airplane! (1980) was voted the best comedy film of all time in a 2012 readers' poll by British magazine Empire.
- This Is Spinal Tap (1984) was voted the best comedy movie of all time in a poll of over 70 stand-up comedians, actors, writers, and directors conducted by Time Out London in 2016.

=== Disaster ===
- The Poseidon Adventure (1972) was voted best disaster movie in a poll of 500 members of the UCI Cinemas staff in May 2004.

=== Documentary ===
- Man with a Movie Camera (1929) was voted the greatest documentary film of all time with 125 votes (100 critics and 25 filmmakers) in a 2014 Sight and Sound poll of 238 critics, curators, and academics (including many documentary specialists) and 103 filmmakers.
- Hoop Dreams (1994) was ranked as the greatest documentary of all time by the International Documentary Association (IDA) in 2007. Voters selected from a list of over 700 films.
- Bowling for Columbine (2002) heads the list of 20 all-time favorite non-fiction films selected by members of the IDA in 2002.

=== Fantasy ===
- The Lord of the Rings: The Fellowship of the Ring (2001) was voted the greatest fantasy movie of all time in a reader's poll conducted by American magazine Wired in 2012, with its sequels The Two Towers (2002) and The Return of the King (2003) placing fourth and third respectively.

=== Horror ===
- The Exorcist (1973) was voted the best horror film of all time with 53 votes in a 2012 poll of 150 experts conducted by Time Out London. It was also voted the best horror film with 67 votes in a 2015 poll of 104 horror professionals conducted by HitFix, and topped a readers' poll by Rolling Stone magazine in 2014.
- The Texas Chain Saw Massacre (1974) was ranked number 1 on British film magazine Total Film's 2005 list of the greatest horror films. In 2010 it was voted into first place in an additional Total Film poll of leading directors and stars of horror films.

=== LGBT ===
- Brokeback Mountain (2005) was ranked as the top LGBT film in a 2016 poll of 28 directors, actors, and screenwriters, conducted by Time Out London.
- Carol (2015) was ranked as the top LGBT film in a 2016 poll of more than 100 critics, filmmakers, programmers, writers, curators, and academics conducted by the British Film Institute.

=== Musical ===
- West Side Story (1961) was chosen as the best screen musical by readers of British newspaper The Observer in a 2007 poll.
- The Rocky Horror Picture Show (1975) was voted the best movie musical by readers of Rolling Stone in a 2017 poll.

=== Romance ===
- Casablanca (1942) was voted the best romance film of all time with 56 votes in a 1996 poll of 100 experts organized by Spanish film magazine Nickel Odeon.
- Brief Encounter (1945) was voted the best romance film of all time with 25 votes in a 2013 poll of 101 experts conducted by Time Out London.
- Titanic (1997) was voted the most romantic film of all time in a poll conducted by Fandango in February 2011.

=== Science fiction ===
- 2001: A Space Odyssey (1968) was voted the best science fiction film of all time with 73 votes in a 2014 poll of 136 science fiction experts, filmmakers, science fiction writers, film critics, and scientists conducted by Time Out London. It was voted the best science fiction film of all time by 115 members of the Online Film Critics Society in 2002. It topped a readers' poll conducted by Rolling Stone magazine in 2014.
- Blade Runner (1982) was voted the best science fiction film by a panel of 56 scientists assembled by the British newspaper The Guardian in 2004. In British magazine New Scientist, Blade Runner was voted "all-time favourite science fiction film" in the readers' poll in 2008, with 12 percent of thousands of votes. It topped a 2011 poll by Total Film magazine.
- Serenity (2005) was voted the best science fiction movie in a 2007 poll of 3,000 people conducted by SFX magazine.

=== Silent ===
- Battleship Potemkin (1925) was voted the best silent film with 32 votes in a 1964 poll of 50 Swedish film professionals organized by Swedish film magazine Chaplin.

=== Sports ===
- Rocky (1976) topped British website Digital Spy's "greatest ever sports movie" online poll in 2012, with 18.7% of the votes. Voters chose from a list of 25 films. It was also voted the best sports movie of all time in a 2020 poll organized by The Athletic. They asked 120 panelists to nominate their favorite sports movies, and then to rate each nomination from 1 to 100. Movies with at least 10 ratings qualified for the final list. Rocky had the highest average rating, 91.04.

=== Superhero ===
- Superman (1978) was voted the greatest superhero movie in a poll of 1000 British adults conducted by Virgin Media in 2018.
- The Dark Knight (2008) was voted the greatest superhero movie in a reader's poll conducted by American magazine Rolling Stone in 2014.

=== War ===
- Saving Private Ryan (1998) was voted as the greatest war film in a 2008 Channel 4 poll of the 100 greatest war films.

=== Western ===
- Stagecoach (1939) was voted the best western film of all time with 54 votes in a 1996 poll of 100 experts organized by Spanish film magazine Nickel Odeon.
- Johnny Guitar (1954) was the most cited film in the "Ten Best Westerns" lists of 27 French critics in Le Western.

== National polls ==
=== Argentina ===
- Prisioneros de la tierra (1939) was voted as the greatest Argentine film of all time in two polls carried out by the Museo del Cine Pablo Ducros Hicken in 1977 and 1984.
- Crónica de un niño solo (1965) was voted as the greatest Argentine film of all time in a poll carried out by the Museo del Cine Pablo Ducros Hicken in 2000.
- La Ciénaga (2001) was voted as the greatest Argentine film of all time in a 2022 poll organized by film magazines La vida útil, Taipei and La tierra quema— inspired by the previous lists by the Museo del Cine Pablo Ducrós Hicken—which was presented at the Mar del Plata International Film Festival.

=== Australia ===
- Picnic at Hanging Rock (1975) was voted the best Australian film of all time by members of the Australian Film Institute, industry guilds and unions, film critics and reviewers, academics and media teachers, and Kookaburra Card members of the National Film and Sound Archive (NFSA), in a 1996 poll organized by the Victorian Centenary of Cinema Committee and the NFSA.
- The Castle (1997) was selected by the public as Australia's favourite film in a 2008 online poll conducted by the Australian Film Institute, in collaboration with Australia Post. The Adelaide film festival ran a public vote, that again voted it as the greatest Australian film ever in 2018.

=== Bangladesh ===
- Titash Ekti Nadir Naam (1973) topped the list of 10 best Bangladeshi films in the audience and critics' polls conducted by the British Film Institute in 2002.

=== Belarus ===
- Come and See (1985) was voted the best Belarusian film of all time in a 2024 poll of 49 film experts organized by the Belarusian Independent Film Academy.

=== Bosnia and Herzegovina ===
- Do You Remember Dolly Bell? (1981) was voted the best Bosnian film of all time in a 2003 poll of 13 film professionals organized by The National Film Archive of Bosnia and Herzegovina.

=== Brazil ===
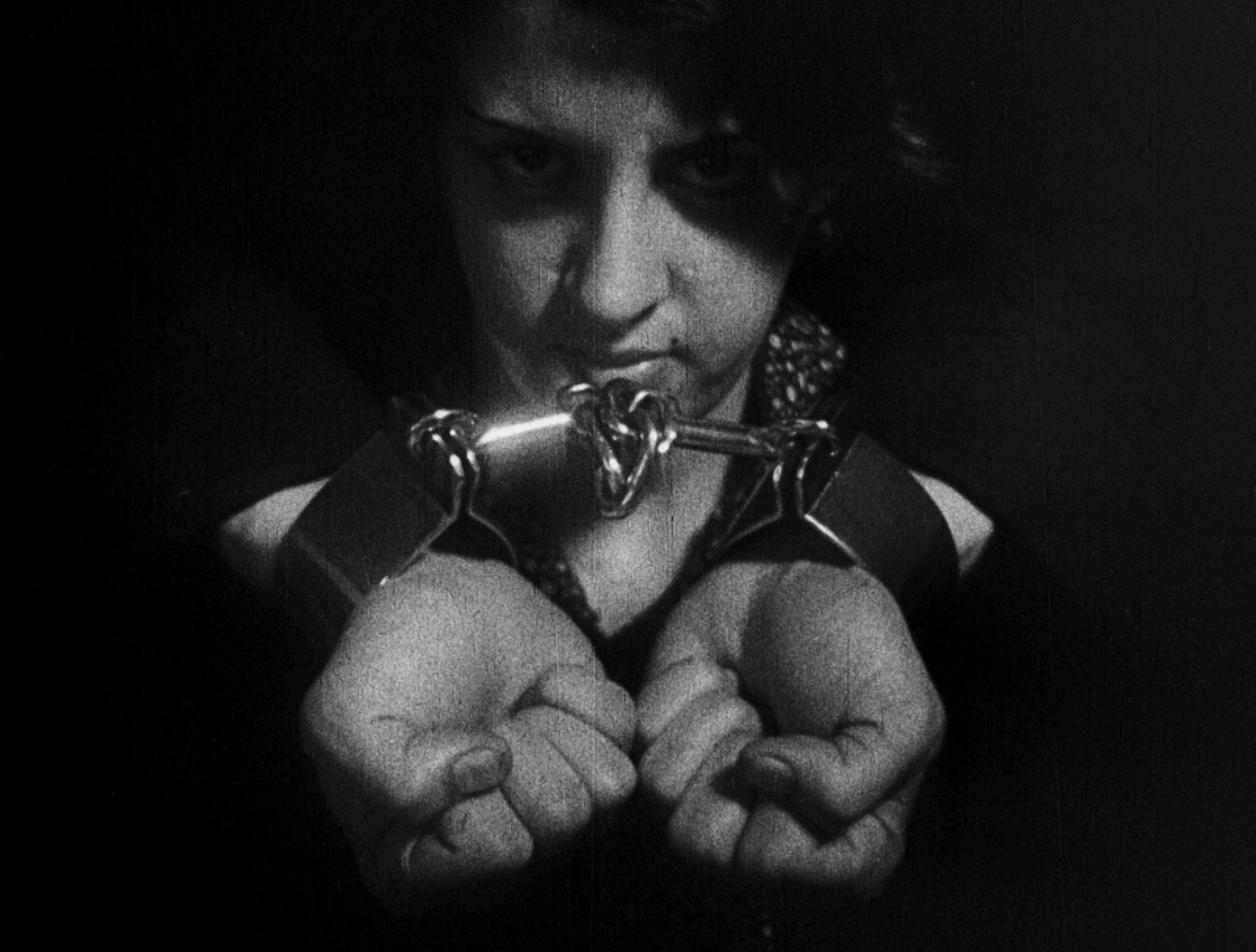
Limite (1931) was voted best Brazilian film by the Brazilian Film Critics Association.

- Limite (1931) was voted the best Brazilian film of all time in a 1995 national survey of critics by Folha de S.Paulo. It is ranked number 1 on the Brazilian Film Critics Association's list of the top 100 Brazilian films, voted by its 100 members in 2015.
- Black God, White Devil (1964) was voted the best Brazilian film of all time in a 2001 poll of 108 critics and film professionals organized by Brazilian film magazine Contracampo.
- The Red Light Bandit (1968) was voted the best Brazilian film of all time in a 2011 poll of 102 critics, researchers, and professionals organized by Brazilian film magazine Filme Cultura.

=== Bulgaria ===
- Time of Violence (1988) was voted the best Bulgarian film of all time in an audience poll organized by the Bulgarian National Television.

=== Canada ===
- Mon oncle Antoine (1971) was named first in the Toronto International Film Festival's Top 10 Canadian Films of All Time in 1984, 1993 and 2004.
- The Sweet Hereafter (1997) was voted the best Canadian film by readers of Playback in 2002 in an online poll. More than 500 industry respondents participated in the poll.
- Atanarjuat: The Fast Runner (2001) was voted the best Canadian film of all time with 94 votes in a 2015 poll of 220 filmmakers, critics, programmers, and academics organized by the Toronto International Film Festival, dethroning Mon oncle Antoine which won the previous three polls.

=== Chile ===
- Jackal of Nahueltoro (1969) was voted the best Chilean film of all time with 57 votes in a 2016 poll of 77 directors, actors, programmers, scholars, journalists, and critics organized by CineChile.
- Julio comienza en julio (1979) was chosen in 1999 as the "Best Chilean Film of the Century" in a vote organized by the Municipality of Santiago.

=== China ===
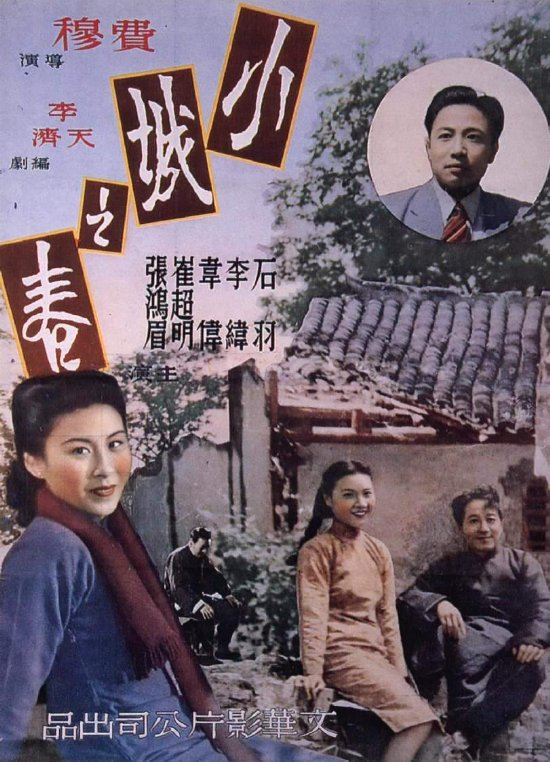
Spring in a Small Town (1948)

- Spring in a Small Town (小城之春; 1948) was ranked number 1 on the Hong Kong Film Awards Association's Best 100 Chinese Motion Pictures list in 2005. It was also voted the best Chinese film of all time with 25 votes in a 2010 poll of 37 critics organized by the Hong Kong Film Critics Society.
- Farewell My Concubine (霸王别姬; 1993) was voted the best Mainland Chinese film of all time by 88 international film experts in a poll conducted by Time Out Shanghai and Time Out Beijing in 2014.

=== Colombia ===
- The Strategy of the Snail (1993) was voted the best Colombian film of all time with 38 votes in a 2015 poll of 65 critics and journalists organized by Colombian magazine Semana.

=== Croatia ===
- Tko pjeva zlo ne misli (One Who Sings Means No Harm, 1970) was voted the best Croatian film of all time by 44 Croatian film critics in 1999, in a poll organized by the Croatian magazine Hollywood. It was also voted the best Croatian film by Hollywood's readers.
- H-8 (1958) was voted the best Croatian feature film of all time by 38 Croatian film critics and scholars in a 2020 poll.

=== Cuba ===
- Memories of Underdevelopment (1968) was voted the best Latin American film of all time with 30 votes in a 1999 poll of 36 critics and film specialists from 11 countries organized by critics Carlos Galiano and Rufo Caballero. It was also voted the best Ibero-American film of all time in a 2009 poll of more than 500 film professionals, critics, journalists, festival organizers, and fans around the world organized by Spanish magazine Noticine.

=== Czech Republic ===
- Christian (1939) was voted best Czech film of all time in a poll held by Media Desk and Týden magazine in 2010.
- Marketa Lazarova (1967) was voted the best Czech film of all time by Czech journalists during the Karlovy Vary International Film Festival in 1994. It also topped 1998 poll of Czech and Slovak film critics and publicists during the 1998 Karlovy Vary International Film Festival.
- The Firemen's Ball (1967) was voted the best Czech film in a 2018 poll of 20 Czech historians, theorists and critics.
- The Cremator (1969) was voted the best Czech film by public in a 2018 poll, Kánon 100.
- Cosy Dens (1999) was voted the best Czech film with 622 votes in a readers' poll by Reflex magazine in 2011.

=== Czechoslovakia ===
- Marketa Lazarova (1967) was voted the best Czech-Slovak film of all time in a 1998 poll of 55 Czech and Slovak film critics and publicists, receiving 41 votes.
- The Firemen's Ball (1967) was voted the best Czech-Slovak film of all time with 33 votes in a 2007 poll of 53 experts (mostly from the Czech Republic, but also from Slovakia and Poland) titled "Filmové dědictví česko-slovenské kinematografie".
- The Elementary School (1991) was voted the best Czech-Slovak film with 192 votes in a 2007 public poll of "Filmové dědictví česko-slovenské kinematografie".

=== Denmark ===
- Blinkende lygter (Flickering Lights, 2000) was voted best movie in Denmark by interviewing over 1500 people, reported by the analysis institute YouGov on behalf of the streamingservice Nordic Film+.

=== Egypt ===
- The Night of Counting the Years (1969) was voted the best Arab film of all time (i.e. the best film made in an Arab country) in a 2013 poll of 475 film critics, writers, novelists, academics, and other arts professionals organized by the Dubai International Film Festival.

=== Estonia ===
- Kevade (Spring, 1969) received first place in the Estonian feature films Top Ten Poll in 2002 held by Estonian film critics and journalists.
- Autumn Ball (2007) was voted the best Estonian film of all time with 29 votes in a 2011 poll of 33 film writers and film scholars organized by the Estonian Association of Film Journalists.

=== Finland ===
- The Unknown Soldier (1955) was voted the best Finnish movie by 1213 respondents in an Internet poll by Helsingin Sanomat in 2007.
- Inspector Palmu's Mistake (1960) was chosen as the best Finnish fictional movie of all time in a poll of 48 critics by Yle in 2012.

=== France ===
- The Rules of the Game (1939) was voted the best French film of all time with 15 votes in a 2012 poll of 85 film professionals conducted by Time Out Paris. It was voted the best European film of all time with 56 votes (tied with the German film Nosferatu) in a 1994 poll of 70 critics and film historians organized by Cinemateca Portuguesa.

=== Georgia ===
- Eliso (1928) was voted the best Georgian film of all time in a critic poll organized by Tbilisi Intermedia.

=== Germany ===
Nosferatu (1922)

- Nosferatu (1922) was voted the best European film of all time with 56 votes (tied with the French film The Rules of the Game) in a 1994 poll of 70 critics and film historians organized by Cinemateca Portuguesa.
- M (1931) was voted the best German film of all time with 306 votes in a 1994 poll of 324 film journalists, film critics, filmmakers, and cineastes organized by the Association of German Cinémathèques.

=== Greece ===
- O Drakos (1956) was voted the best Greek film of all time by members of the Greek Film Critics Association in 2006.
- Evdokia (1971) was voted the best Greek film of all time by members of the Greek Film Critics Association in 1986.

=== Hong Kong ===
- A Better Tomorrow (英雄本色; 1986), filmed and produced in Hong Kong, was voted the second-best Chinese-language film ever made by the Hong Kong Film Awards Association in 2005.
- Days of Being Wild (阿飛正傳; 1990) was voted the best Hong Kong film of all time with 16 votes in a 2010 poll of 37 critics organized by the Hong Kong Film Critics Society.
- In the Mood for Love (花樣年華; 2000) reached the highest position (number 5 in 2022) of any Hong Kong film on the 2022 Sight & Sound poll's lists of greatest films of all time.

=== Hungary ===
- The Round-Up (1965) was chosen as the best Hungarian film in a 2000 Hungarian film critics' poll.

=== Iceland ===
- Children of Nature (1991) was voted the best Icelandic film of all time in a Stockfish poll of 12 film experts.

=== India ===
- Pather Panchali (1955) topped the British Film Institute's user poll of "Top 10 Indian Films" of all time in 2002.
- Mayabazar (1957) was chosen as the greatest Indian film of all time with 16,960 votes in an online poll conducted by IBN Live in 2013. Voters select from a list of 100 films from different Indian languages, and 70,926 votes were cast.
- Sholay (1975) topped the British Film Institute's critics' poll of "Top 10 Indian Films" of all time in 2002.

==== Bollywood ====
- Mother India (1957) was voted the best Bollywood film of all time with 15 votes in a 2003 poll of 25 directors organized by Indian magazine Outlook.
- Sholay (1975) was voted the best Bollywood film of all time with 17 votes in a 2015 poll of 27 Bollywood experts organized by Time Out London.

=== Iran ===
- The Deer (1974) was voted the best Iranian film of all time with 33 votes in a 2009 poll of 92 critics organized by Iranian film magazine Film, and again in a follow-up poll of 140 critics in 2019.
- Bashu, the Little Stranger (1986) was voted "Best Iranian Film of all time" in November 1999 by a Persian movie magazine Picture World poll of 150 Iranian critics and professionals.
- Close-Up (1990) reached the highest position (number 17 in 2022) of Iranian film on the 2022 Sight & Sound poll's lists of greatest films of all time.

=== Ireland ===
- The Commitments (1991) was voted the best Irish film of all time in a 2005 Jameson Whiskey online poll of over 10,000 Irish people.
- An Cailín Ciúin (The Quiet Girl) (2022) was voted by 30 film-makers and critics as the best Irish film for the Irish Independent in 2023.

=== Israel ===
- Giv'at Halfon Eina Ona (1976) was voted "Favorite Israeli Film of All Time" in a 2004 poll by Ynet, the platform of the Israeli newspaper Yediot Ahronot. The film received votes from 25,000 web users.
- Avanti Popolo (1986) was voted "Greatest Israeli Film of All Time" in a 2013 poll of 20 Israeli film experts by NRG Ma'ariv.

=== Italy ===
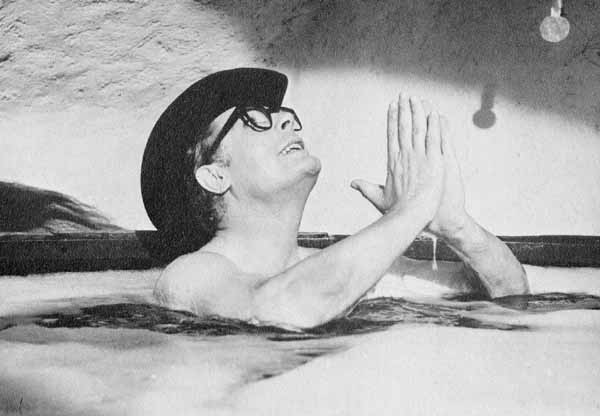
8½ (1963) was the highest-ranked Italian film in many international professional polls.

- Bicycle Thieves (1948) topped the first Sight & Sound critics' poll in 1952.
- 8½ (1963) was voted the best foreign (i.e. non-Swedish) sound film with 21 votes in a 1964 poll of 50 Swedish film professionals organized by Swedish film magazine Chaplin. It was also ranked number 1 when the Museum of Cinematography in Łódź asked 279 Polish film professionals (filmmakers, critics, and professors) to vote for the best films in 2015.

=== Japan ===
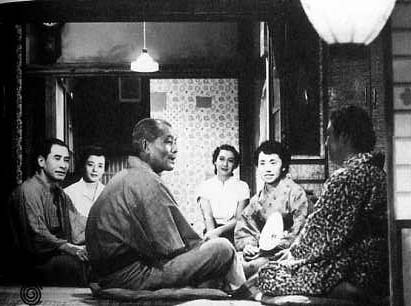
Tokyo Story (1953) topped several international polls, including the 2012 Sight & Sound directors' poll.

- Rashomon (1950) was ranked joint tenth in the 1992 Sight & Sound directors' poll, and joint ninth in 2002.
- Tokyo Story (東京物語; 1953) topped the Sight & Sound directors' poll with 48 votes and was number 3 in the critics' poll with 107 votes in 2012. It was also voted the best Japanese film of all time in a 2009 poll of 114 critics and film professionals organized by Japanese film magazine Kinema Junpo. It was voted the best Asian film of all time in a 2015 poll of 73 film critics, festival executives, programmers, and directors from around the world, organized by the Busan International Film Festival.
- Seven Samurai (1954) was voted the best Japanese film of all time in a 1989 poll of 372 celebrities for a book published by Bungeishunjū. It was voted the best Japanese film of all time in a 1990 poll of about a million people organized by NHK. It was the greatest foreign-language film in BBC Culture's 2018 poll of 209 critics in 43 countries.

=== Mexico ===
- Vámonos con Pancho Villa (1936) was ranked number 1 Mexican film of all time in a 1994 poll of 25 critics and journalists organized by Mexican magazine Somos.
- Los Olvidados (1950) was voted the best Mexican film of all time in a 2020 poll of 27 critics and journalists organized by Sector Cine online magazine.

=== Netherlands ===
- Turkish Delight (1973) was voted the best Dutch film of the 20th century in a 1999 poll organized by the Netherlands Film Festival.
- Soldaat van Oranje (Soldier of Orange, 1977) was voted the best Dutch film of all time by nearly 9,000 people in a 2006 online poll organized by the now defunct Dutch website Filmwereld.net.
- Zwartboek (Black Book, 2006) was voted the best Dutch film of all time at the 2008 Netherlands Film Festival by nearly 15,000 members of the public.

=== New Zealand ===
- Once Were Warriors (1994) was voted the best New Zealand film of all time in a 2014 online poll organized by Fairfax Media. More than 500 people voted, including about 100 film professionals and 15 critics.

=== North Korea ===
- Hong Kil-dong (1986) was voted the "best North Korean film ever" in a 2002 poll of North Koreans in South Korea, organized by newspaper The Chosun Ilbo.

=== Norway ===
- Ni Liv (Nine Lives, 1957) was the critics' choice for "Best Norwegian Film of All Time" during the 2005 Bergen International Film Festival.
- The Chasers (1959) was voted the best Norwegian film of all time with 23 votes in a 2011 poll of 32 critics and experts organized by Norwegian film magazine Rushprint.
- Flåklypa Grand Prix (Pinchcliffe Grand Prix, 1975) was the people's choice for "Best Norwegian Film of All Time" during the 2005 Bergen International Film Festival.

=== Pakistan ===
- Baji (1963) topped the British Film Institute's critics' poll of "Top 10 Pakistani Films" of all time in 2002.
- Aina (1977) topped the British Film Institute's user poll of "Top 10 Pakistani Films" of all time in 2002.

=== Philippines ===
- Maynila sa mga Kuko ng Liwanag (Manila in the Claws of Light, 1975) was voted the best Filipino film of all time in a 2013 poll of 81 critics, filmmakers, archivists, and academics organized by Pinoy Rebyu. It was also voted the best Filipino film of all time with 16 votes (tied with Ganito Kami Noon, Paano Kayo Ngayon) in a 1989 poll of 28 filmmakers and critics, organized by Joel David and his UP film criticism class, and published in Philippine magazine National Midweek. The article also included a list of the most common number-one choices (topped by Manila in the Claws of Light), as well as an alternate version of the top 10 (topped by Manila by Night) which was ordered by average rank.
- Ganito Kami Noon, Paano Kayo Ngayon (This Was How We Were Then... How Are You Doing Now?, 1976) was voted the best Filipino film of all time with 16 votes (tied with Maynila sa mga Kuko ng Liwanag) in a 1989 poll of 28 filmmakers and critics, organized by Joel David and his UP film criticism class, and published in Philippine magazine National Midweek.

=== Poland ===
- The Promised Land (1975) was voted the best Polish film of all time in a 2015 poll of 279 Polish film professionals organized by the Museum of Cinematography in Łódź.
- Teddy Bear (1981) was voted by the public of 2013 Filmfest PL as the best movie of all time.

=== Portugal ===
- Os Verdes Anos (1963) was voted the best Portuguese film of all time in a 2020 poll of 122 critics and film professionals organized by filmSPOT.

=== Romania ===
- Reconstituirea (The Reenactment, 1968) was selected as the best Romanian film by 40 film critics in 2008.

=== Russia ===
- My Friend Ivan Lapshin (1985) was voted the best Russian film of all time with 47 votes in a 2008 poll of 100 filmmakers and critics, organized by Russian film magazine Seance.

=== Serbia ===
- Who's Singin' Over There? (1980) was voted by Serbian critics the best Serbian film of all time.

=== Slovakia ===
- Pictures of the Old World (1972) was voted the best Slovak film of all time by Slovak critics in 2000.

=== Slovenia ===
- Dancing in the Rain (1961) was voted the best Slovenian film of all time in a poll by Slovenian critics.

=== South Korea ===
- The Housemaid (1960) was voted best South Korean film of all time in a 2024 poll by the Korean Film Archive of 240 critics.
- Obaltan (1961) was voted the best South Korean film of all time with 48 votes in a 1999 poll of 140 filmmakers organized by South Korean newspaper The Chosun Ilbo. It was also voted the best South Korean film of all time (tied with The Housemaid and The March of Fools in a 2014 poll of 62 film scholars, critics, film professionals, researchers, and programmers organized by the Korean Film Archive.
- Shiri (1999) was voted the favorite film of South Koreans with 11,918 votes in a 2002 online poll of 54,013 people conducted by South Korean movie channel Orion Cinema Network.
- Memories of Murder (2003) was voted the best South Korean film of all time with 806 votes in a 2014 audience poll of 1462 people organized by the Korean Film Archive.
- Burning (2018) was voted the best South Korean film of all time in a 2021 poll of 158 critics from 28 countries organized by Korean Screen.

=== Soviet Union ===
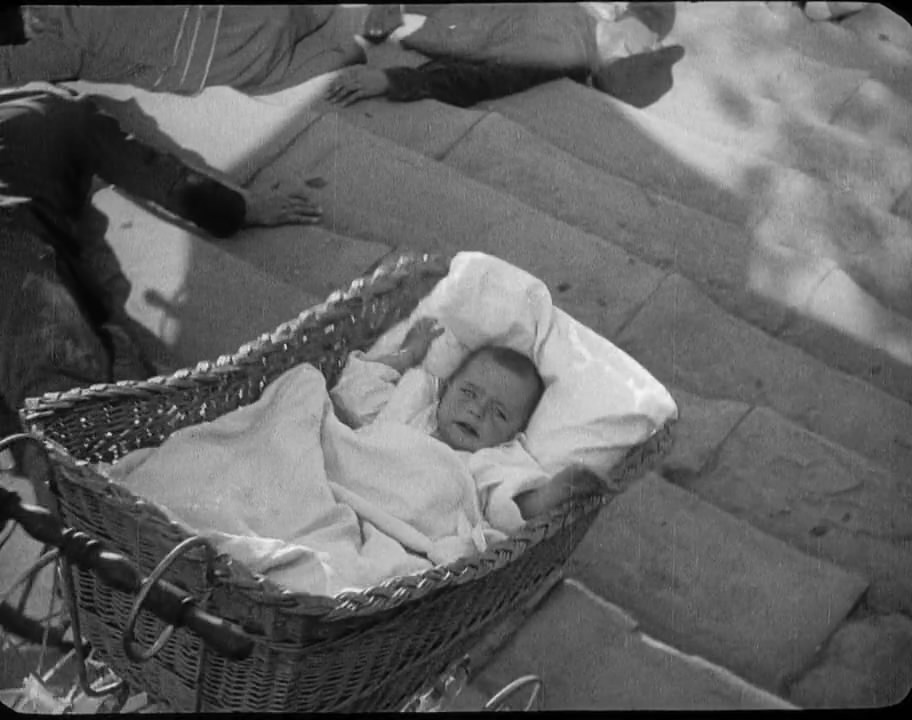
Battleship Potemkin (1925) was an early favorite and the top silent film.

- Battleship Potemkin (1925) was ranked number 1 with 32 votes when the Festival Mondial du Film et des Beaux-Arts de Belgique asked 63 film professionals around the world, mostly directors, to vote for the best films of the half-century in 1951. It was ranked number 1 when the Brussels World's Fair polled 117 experts from 26 countries in 1958.
- Man with a Movie Camera (1929) was voted the eighth greatest film ever made in the British Film Institute's 2012 Sight & Sound poll.
- Mirror (1975) ranked 9th in the 2012 Sight & Sound directors' poll.

=== Spain ===
- Viridiana (1961) was voted the best Spanish film of all time with 227 votes in a 2016 poll of 350 experts organized by Spanish film magazine Caimán Cuadernos de Cine.
- El verdugo (1963) was voted the best Spanish film of all time with 77 votes in a 1995 poll of 100 critics and film professionals organized by Spanish film magazine Nickel Odeon.

=== Sri Lanka ===
- Anantha Rathiriya (1995) topped the British Film Institute's user poll of "Top 10 Sri Lankan Films" of all time in 2002.
- Pura Handa Kaluwara (1997) topped the British Film Institute's critics' poll of "Top 10 Sri Lankan Films" of all time in 2002.

=== Sweden ===
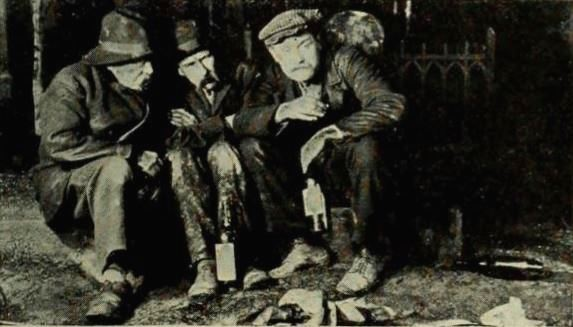
The Phantom Carriage (1921) was voted best Swedish film by critics and academics in FLM's poll.

- The Phantom Carriage (Körkarlen, 1921) was voted the best Swedish film of all time with 30 votes in a poll of 50 film critics and academics conducted by film magazine FLM in 2012.
- Persona (1966) reached the highest position (number 5 in 1972) of any Swedish film on any of Sight & Sound's lists of greatest films of all time.

=== Switzerland ===
- Alpine Fire (1985) was voted the best Swiss film of all time in 2001, 2006, 2011, and 2016, in polls organized by Swiss newspaper SonntagsZeitung. 31 experts participated in 2011, and 36 experts in 2016.

=== Taiwan ===
- A City of Sadness (悲情城市; 1989) was voted the best Chinese-language film of all time with 73 votes in a 2010 poll of 122 film professionals organized by the Taipei Golden Horse Film Festival. It was also number 5, the highest ranked Taiwanese film, on the Hong Kong Film Awards' list of the Best 100 Chinese Motion Pictures, voted by 101 filmmakers, critics, and scholars.

=== Turkey ===
- Dry Summer (1963) was voted the best Turkish film released between 1923 and 2013 in a 2014 poll launched by the Turkish Ministry of Tourism.
- Umut (1970) was voted the best Turkish film of all time in a poll of 100 directors, actors, producers, and film writers organized by the Turkish newspaper Hürriyet.
- Yol (1982) was voted the best Turkish film of all time in a 2016 poll of 383 experts organized by Turkish magazine Notos. It was also selected as the best Turkish film in a 2003 poll undertaken by Ankara Sinema Derneği (Ankara Association for Cinema Culture) of people interested in cinema professionally.

=== Ukraine ===
- Shadows of Forgotten Ancestors (1965) was voted the best Ukrainian film of all time with 30 votes in a 2012 poll of about 100 journalists organized by the Cinema Journalism Bureau of Ukraine and the National Union of Cinematographers of Ukraine.

=== United Kingdom ===
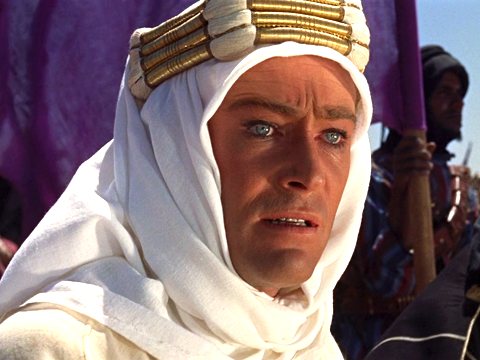
Lawrence of Arabia (1962) was voted the "best British film of all time" by Britain's leading filmmakers.

- The Third Man (1949) was voted the best British film ever by 1000 industry professionals, academics, and critics in a British Film Institute poll conducted in 1999.
- Lawrence of Arabia (1962) was voted the "best British film of all time" in August 2004 by over 200 respondents in a Sunday Telegraph poll of Britain's leading filmmakers.
- The Italian Job (1969) was voted the best British film in a poll of film fans conducted by Sky Movies HD in 2011 when it received 15% of votes. It also topped a 2017 survey by Vue Entertainment.
- Get Carter (1971) was voted the best British film ever in a 2003 poll by Hotdog magazine. It also topped the 2004 poll of 25 film critics conducted by Total Film.
- Don't Look Now (1973) was named the best British film in a poll of 150 film industry experts conducted by Time Out London in 2011.
- Monty Python and the Holy Grail (1975) was voted the best British picture of all time by 7,000 film fans in a 2004 poll by the UK arm of Amazon and Internet Movie Database.
- Trainspotting (1996) was voted the top British film of the last 90 years by the public, in a 2024 survey conducted on behalf of the British Council.

=== United States ===
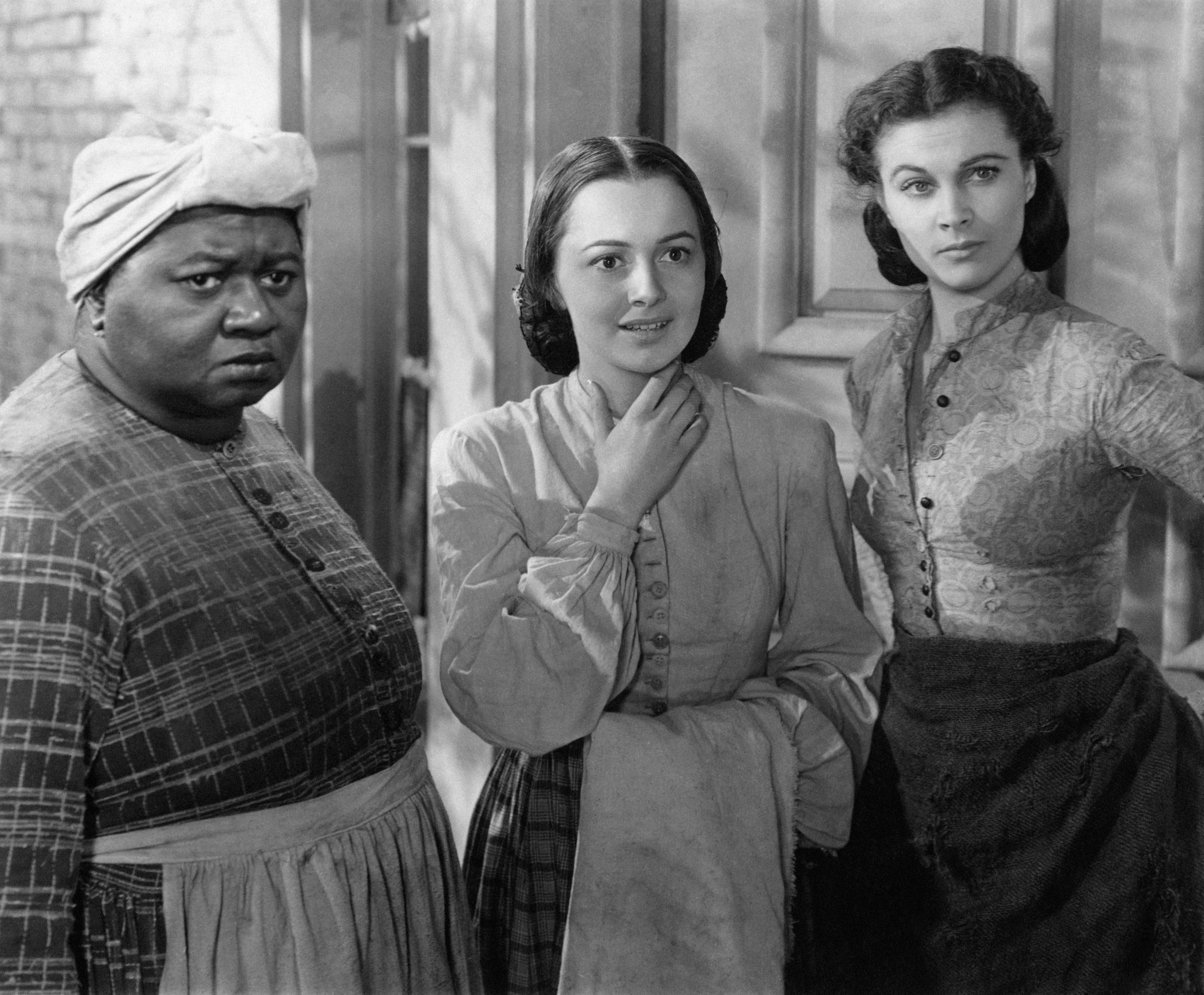
Gone with the Wind (1939) has repeatedly been cited as Americans' favourite film or as the best American film.

- Gone with the Wind (1939) was voted the favorite film of Americans in a poll of 2,279 adults undertaken by Harris Interactive in 2008, and again in a follow-up poll of 2,276 adults in 2014. It was picked in 2011 as the best film for Best in Film: The Greatest Movies of Our Time, an online poll in which over 500,000 votes were cast. Voters chose from a list of 10 English-language films selected by film industry experts. It was also voted the best American film of all time by 35,000 members of the American Film Institute in 1977.
- Citizen Kane (1941) was selected as the greatest American film in 2015 by sixty-two international film critics surveyed by the BBC. It was also ranked top in every Sight & Sound critics' poll between 1962 and 2002, and the directors' poll in 1992 and 2002. The American Film Institute polled 1,500 film community leaders for the lists 100 Years...100 Movies and the 10th Anniversary Edition in 1998 and 2007 respectively, asking voters to choose from a list of 400 nominations. Both polls identified Citizen Kane as the best American film ever. It was voted the best American film of all time with 156 votes in a 1977 poll of 203 experts from 22 countries (116 Americans and 87 non-Americans). The poll was organized by the Royal Belgian Film Archive and titled "The most important and misappreciated American films", and they were looking for subjective choices.
- Casablanca (1942) was voted the greatest American film by readers of the Los Angeles Daily News in 1997.
- Vertigo (1958) topped the Sight & Sound critics' poll in 2012 with 191 votes.
- The Godfather (1972) was selected as the greatest film by 2,120 industry professionals in a Hollywood survey undertaken by The Hollywood Reporter in 2014.

=== Uruguay ===
- Whisky (2004) was voted the best Uruguayan film of all time by 22 members of the Uruguayan Film Critics Association in 2015.

=== Venezuela ===
- El Pez que Fuma (1977) was voted the best Venezuelan film of all time with 22 votes in a 1987 poll of 29 experts organized by Imagen magazine. It was also voted the best Venezuelan film of all time with 33 votes in a 2016 poll of 41 experts organized by the Fundación Cinemateca Nacional.

== See also ==
- List of Best Picture awards
- List of film awards
- List of highest-grossing films
- List of film-related topics
- List of films with a 100% rating on Rotten Tomatoes
- List of films considered the worst
- List of anime series listed among the best
- List of television shows considered the best
- List of video games listed among the best
