= Kurakh =

Kurakh may refer to:

- Kurakh, Russia, a rural locality (a selo) in Kurakhsky District of the Republic of Dagestan, Russia
- Kurakh, alternative name of Qureq, a village in Kurdistan Province of Iran
