= Yaminan-e Sofla =

Yaminan-e Sofla يمينان سفلي
- Village
- Location within Iran
- Coordinates: 34°59′48″N 46°55′54″E
- Country: Iran
- Province: Kurdistan
- County: Kamyaran
- Bakhsh: Muchesh
- Rural District: Avalan

Population (2006)
  - Total: 518
- Time zone: UTC+3:30 (IRST)
  - Summer (DST): UTC+4:30 (IRDT)

Yaminan-e Sofla (Persian: يمينان سفلي, also Romanized as Yamīnān-e Soflá; also known as Yamanān, Yamīnān, Yamīnān-e Pā'īn, Yamnān, Yamnān-e Pā’īn, and Yamnān-e Soflá) is a village in Avalan Rural District, Muchesh District, Kamyaran County, Kurdistan Province, Iran. At the 2006 census, its population was 518, in 132 families. The village is populated by Kurds.
