= Bansaid-e Sofla =

Bansaid-e Sofla بان سعيدسفلي
- Village
- Location within Iran
- Coordinates: 34°56′52″N 47°07′38″E
- Country: Iran
- Province: Kurdistan
- County: Kamyaran
- Bakhsh: Muchesh
- Rural District: Sursur

Population (2006)
  - Total: 50
- Time zone: UTC+3:30 (IRST)
  - Summer (DST): UTC+4:30 (IRDT)

Bansaid-e Sofla (Persian: بان سعيدسفلي, also Romanized as Bānsa‘īd-e Soflá) is a village in Sursur Rural District, Muchesh District, Kamyaran County, Kurdistan Province, Iran. At the 2006 census, its population was 50, in 9 families. The village is populated by Kurds.
