= Gavrud Rural District =

Gavrud Rural District (Persian: دهستان گاورود) may refer to:

- Gavrud Rural District (Kermanshah Province)
- Gavrud Rural District (Kurdistan Province)
