= Kuik, Kurdistan =

Kuik کوئیک
- Village
- Location within Iran
- Coordinates: 35°01′14″N 47°01′52″E
- Country: Iran
- Province: Kurdistan
- County: Kamyaran
- Bakhsh: Muchesh
- Rural District: Avalan

Population (2006)
  - Total: 76
- Time zone: UTC+3:30 (IRST)
  - Summer (DST): UTC+4:30 (IRDT)

Kuik (Persian: کوئیک, also Romanized as Kū’īk; also known as Kovīk, Kuhik, and Kūvīk) is a village in Avalan Rural District, Muchesh District, Kamyaran County, Kurdistan Province, Iran. At the 2006 census, its population was 76, in 18 families. The village is populated by Kurds.
