= Yaminan-e Olya =

Yaminan-e Olya يمينان عليا
- Village
- Location within Iran
- Coordinates: 34°59′33″N 46°55′16″E
- Country: Iran
- Province: Kurdistan
- County: Kamyaran
- Bakhsh: Muchesh
- Rural District: Avalan

Population (2006)
  - Total: 112
- Time zone: UTC+3:30 (IRST)
  - Summer (DST): UTC+4:30 (IRDT)

Yaminan-e Olya (Persian: يمينان عليا, also Romanized as Yamīnān-e ‘Olya; also known as Yamīnān-e Bālā, Yamnān-e Bālā, and Yamnān-e ‘Olyā) is a village in Avalan Rural District, Muchesh District, Kamyaran County, Kurdistan Province, Iran. At the 2006 census, its population was 112, in 28 families. The village is populated by Kurds.
