= Yusofabad, Kurdistan =

Village in Kurdistan province, Iran

Yusofabad Persian: يوسف آباد
- Village
- Location within Iran Location within Iran Kurdistan
- Coordinates: 34°57′00″N 46°58′00″E
- Country: Iran
- Province: Kurdistan
- County: Kamyaran
- District: Muchesh
- Rural District: Sursur

Population (2016)
  - Total: 112
- Time zone: UTC+3:30 (IRST)

Yusofabad (Persian: يوسف آباد) (Note: Also romanized as Yūsofābād) is a village in, and the capital of, Sursur Rural District of Muchesh District, Kamyaran County, Kurdistan province, Iran.

== Demographics ==
=== Ethnicity ===
The village is populated by Kurds.

=== Population ===
At the time of the 2006 National Census, the village's population was 176 in 40 households. The following census in 2011 counted 207 people in 37 households. The 2016 census measured the population of the village as 112 people in 37 households.
