= Tay, Iran =

Village in Kurdistan province, Iran

Tay Persian: طاي
- Village
- Location within Iran Location within Iran Kurdistan
- Coordinates: 35°00′14″N 46°47′57″E
- Country: Iran
- Province: Kurdistan
- County: Kamyaran
- District: Muchesh
- Rural District: Gavrud

Population (2016)
  - Total: 1,489
- Time zone: UTC+3:30 (IRST)

Tay (Persian: طاي) (Note: Also romanized as Ţā’ and Ţāy) is a village in Gavrud Rural District, Muchesh District, Kamyaran County, Kurdistan province, Iran.

== Demographics ==
=== Ethnicity ===
The village is populated by Kurds.

=== Population ===
At the time of the 2006 National Census, the village's population was 1,716 in 402 households. The following census in 2011 counted 1,723 people in 472 households. The 2016 census measured the population of the village as 1,489 people in 437 households. It was the most populous village in its rural district.
