= Marenj =

Village in Kurdistan province, Iran

Marenj Persian: مارنج
- Village
- Location within Iran Location within Iran Kurdistan
- Coordinates: 35°04′18″N 47°08′13″E
- Country: Iran
- Province: Kurdistan
- County: Kamyaran
- District: Muchesh
- Rural District: Amirabad

Population (2016)
  - Total: 887
- Time zone: UTC+3:30 (IRST)

Marenj (Persian: مارنج) (Note: Also romanized as Mārenj; also known as Malrenj, Mārīnj, and Mārj) is a village in Amirabad Rural District of Muchesh District, Kamyaran County, Kurdistan province, Iran.

== Demographics ==
=== Ethnicity ===
The village is populated by Kurds.

=== Population ===
At the time of the 2006 National Census, the village's population was 1,055 in 270 households. The following census in 2011 counted 1,002 people in 289 households. The 2016 census measured the population of the village as 887 people in 280 households. It was the most populous village in its rural district.
