= Qureq =

Qureq قورق
- Village
- Location within Iran
- Coordinates: 35°01′34″N 47°03′46″E
- Country: Iran
- Province: Kurdistan
- County: Kamyaran
- Bakhsh: Muchesh
- Rural District: Amirabad

Population (2006)
  - Total: 651
- Time zone: UTC+3:30 (IRST)
  - Summer (DST): UTC+4:30 (IRDT)

Qureq (Persian: قورق, also Romanized as Qūreq and Qowreq; also known as Kuhīk, Kurakh, Kūyek, Qoroq, Qowrekh, and Qūrakh) is a village in Amirabad Rural District, Muchesh District, Kamyaran County, Kurdistan Province, Iran. At the 2006 census, its population was 651, in 177 families. The village is populated by Kurds.
