= Noshur-e Sofla =

Village in Kurdistan province, Iran

Noshur-e Sofla Persian: نشور سفلي
- Village
- Location within Iran Location within Iran Kurdistan
- Coordinates: 35°01′40″N 46°56′54″E
- Country: Iran
- Province: Kurdistan
- County: Kamyaran
- District: Muchesh
- Rural District: Avalan

Population (2016)
  - Total: 502
- Time zone: UTC+3:30 (IRST)

Noshur-e Sofla (Persian: نشورسفلي) (Note: Also romanized as Noshūr-e Soflá; also known as Āsīāb Barq) is a village in, and the capital of, Avalan Rural District of Muchesh District, Kamyaran County, Kurdistan province, Iran.

== Demographics ==
=== Ethnicity ===
The village is populated by Kurds.

=== Population ===
At the time of the 2006 National Census, the village's population was 485 in 121 households. The following census in 2011 counted 605 people in 146 households. The 2016 census measured the population of the village as 502 people in 144 households. It was the most populous village in its rural district.
