= Mehrab (disambiguation) =

A mehrab or mihrab is a semicircular niche in the wall of a mosque that indicates the direction of the Kaaba in Mecca and, hence, the direction that Muslims should face when praying.

Mehrab may also refer to:

== People ==
- Mehrab of Shirvan, 16th century Shah of Shirvan
- Mehrab I of Kalat, 17th century Khan of the princely state of Kalat
- Mehrab Khan II of Kalat, 19th century Khan of the princely state of Kalat
- Al-Mehrab (1939–2003), senior Iraqi Shia cleric and leader of the Supreme Council for Islamic Revolution in Iraq
- Mehrab Ghasemkhani, Iranian screenwriter and actor.
- Mehrab Fatemi, Persian strongman and three-time Asian Powerlifting champion.
- Mehrab Shahrokhi (1944–1993), Afro-Iranian footballer having played for Iranian national football team

== Places ==
- Mehrab, Kurdistan (محراب - Meḩrāb), a village in Kurdistan Province, Iran

== Other uses ==
- Mehrab (rocket)

== See also ==
- Mehrabad (disambiguation)
