= Muchesh =

City in Kurdistan province, Iran

Muchesh Persian: موچش
- City
- Location within Iran Location within Iran Kurdistan
- Coordinates: 35°03′25″N 47°09′08″E
- Country: Iran
- Province: Kurdistan
- County: Kamyaran
- District: Muchesh

Population (2016)
  - Total: 3,370
- Time zone: UTC+3:30 (IRST)

Muchesh (Persian: موچش) (Note: Also romanized as Mūchesh; also known as Mūjash) is a city in, and the capital of, Muchesh District of Kamyaran County, Kurdistan province, Iran. It also serves as the administrative center for Amirabad Rural District.

== Demographics ==
=== Ethnicity ===
The city is populated by Kurds.

=== Population ===
At the time of the 2006 National Census, the city's population was 2,950 in 769 households. The following census in 2011 counted 3,448 people in 967 households. The 2016 census measured the population of the city as 3,370 people in 1,047 households.
