= Film (Iranian magazine) =

Film magazine in Iran

- Managing Editor: Pooya Mehrabi
- Categories: Film
- Frequency: Monthly
- Publisher: Pooya mehrabi
- Founder: Massoud Mehrabi
- Founded: 1982
- Country: Iran
- Based in: Tehran
- Language: Persian
- Website: film-magazine.com
- ISSN: 1019-6382

Film (Persian: فیلم) is an Iranian film review magazine published for more than 44 years. The president and chief-editor is Pooya Mehrabi with Massoud Mehrabi as editor. The latter is the founder of Film magazine, the oldest post-revolutionary film magazine in Iran (founded in 1982). It appears on a monthly basis. Abbas Kiarostami and Kiumars Purahmad was one of the film critics worked for the magazine.
