= Abbas Yari =

Iranian journalist and film critic

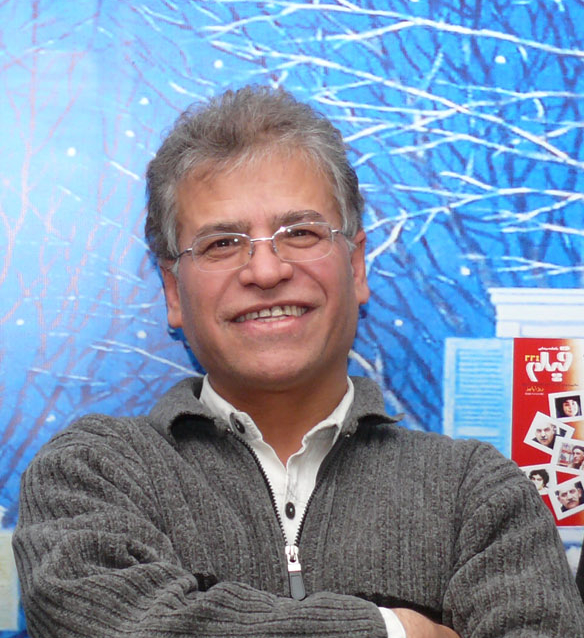
Abbas Yari in spring 2008

Abbas Yari (Persian: عباس ياری) is an Iranian journalist and film critic. He was born in Arak in 1951. He graduated as a cameraman at the Superior School of Cinema in 1975. Abbas Yari started his professional career as a journalist, and worked until 1981 for the newspapers Sobh e Emrouz, Tehran Mosavvar and Kayhan. In 1968, while still a student, he presided the cultural foundation for youth in his hometown, Arak, being responsible of organizing journalistic, poetry, theater and lectures related events. He was the executive director of this magazine from the start till 2021. In 1993, Filmemrooz began to print an English version of the magazine for its international readers.

In 1988, he was one of the founding members of the foundation of art critics and writers about Iranian cinema. Between 2002 and 2005, he organized the Iranian cinema museum in Tehran.
