= Massoud Mehrabi =

Iranian journalist and caricaturist (1954–2020)

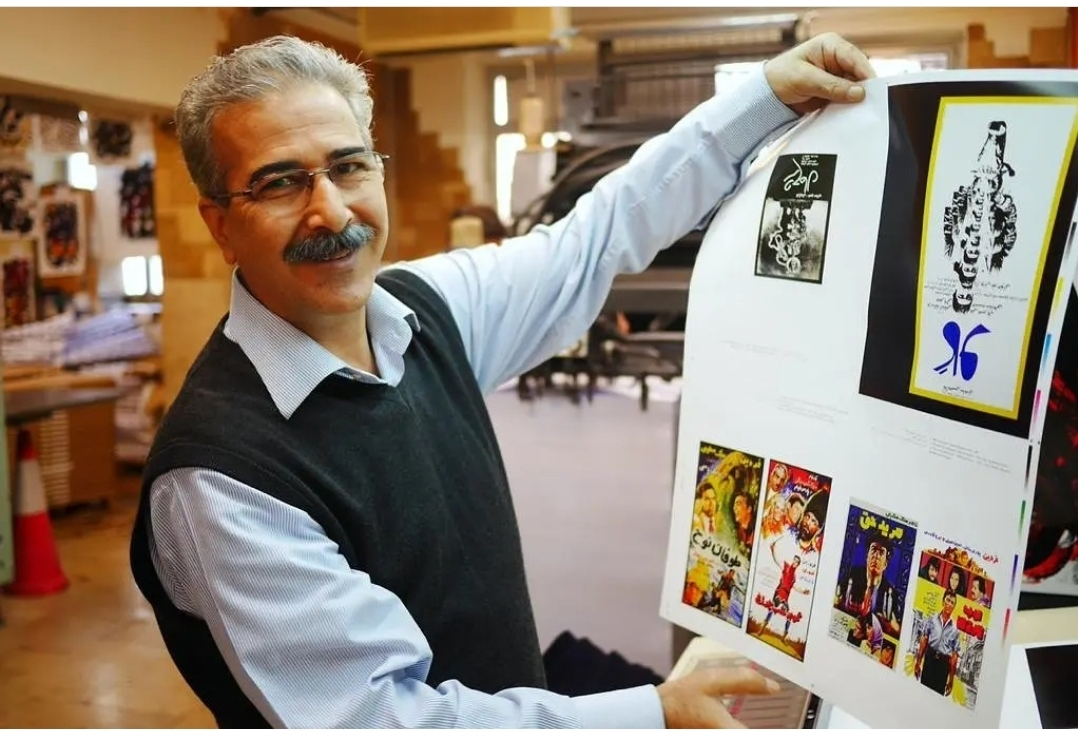

Massoud Mehrabi (1954 – 31 August 2020) was an Iranian journalist, writer and caricaturist. He studied cinema at the Faculty of Dramatic Arts of the University of Art (1977–1982). and later passed a film production management course at the Industrial Management Institute (1983–84). Mehrabi started his professional career as a journalist in 1970, writing articles for several papers. He was the president and publisher of The Film Monthly magazine (since 1981), The Iranian Cinema Yearbook (since 1992) and the English-language Film International quarterly magazine (since 1993). From 1982 to 1989, he worked at the economic desk of the Iranian National Television.

Mehrabi died at age 66 from a heart attack.

== Career ==
Mehrabi wrote books on cinema; his The History of Iranian Cinema (1983) was a best-selling book about Iranian cinema. His later book, A Hundred Years of Film Adverts and Film Posters in Iran (2012), is a bilingual study of a subject little covered previously.

Mehrabi's career roles included being the president and publisher of:

1. Film monthly, in Persian, a film magazine in Iran. Founded in 1981, when there was no other serious film journal and all pre-Revolutionary film journals had ceased to publish for several years, it attracted a number of young film devotees to its staff as writers and critics, many of whom went on to publish magazines of their own.

2. Iranian Cinema Yearbook in Persian (published annually since 1992), which covers all the important film events of the year, and reviews every new film released in Iran.

3. Film International] quarterly, in English (founded 1993), which significantly introduced Iranian cinema, past and present, to the Western audience.

Mehrabi, always interested in caricatures, was a caricaturist and a graphic artist for various Iranian publications since 1970 and participated in several Iranian and international caricature exhibitions.

== Bibliography ==
=== Books on cinema ===
- One Hundred + Five Years of Film Adverts and Film Posters in Iran, 2014
- Massoud, Mehrabi (2011). A Hundred Years Of Film Adverts And Film Posters In Iran Har. مؤسسه فرهنگى پژوهشى چاپ و نشر نظر،. p. 496. ISBN 978-6-001-52046-4.
- Beyond the Dreams Wall: Travelogue of International Film Festivals, 2010
- Massoud, Mehrabi (1983). The History of Iranian Cinema.; 2nd to 10th editions, 1985–2006
- Bibliography of Cinema in Iran, From the Beginning to the Year 2000, 2001
- A Guide to Iranian Documentary Films, From the Beginning Till 1997, 1992
- Film Posters, 1992
- Bibliography of Cinema in Iran, (Vol. II, from 1988 to 1991), 1992
- A Guide to Iranian Short Films, 1990
- A Guide to Iranian Films for Children & Youth, 1989
- Bibliography of Cinema in Iran, (Vol. I, From the Beginning to 1988), 1988

=== Books on caricatures ===
- Looking between the Shades, 1992
- Movie Caricatures (compiled by), 1984
- Teeth, 1982
- Black Caricatures, 1981
- Ladders without Roofs (Roofless Ladders), 1977

== Exhibitions ==
=== Individual exhibitions ===
- The Classic Gallery, Isfahan, 1993
- The Golestan Gallery, Tehran, 1991
- The Museum of Ethnology, Ghazvin, 1981
- The Khane-ye-Aftab Gallery, Tehran, 1981
- The Museum of Contemporary Arts, Tehran, 1980
- The Khane-ye-Aftab Gallery, Tehran, 1979
- Open Show in Paris, 1979
- The Vessal Gallery, Shiraz, 1978
- Khane-ye-Aftab Gallery, Tehran, 1977
- The Takht-e Jamshid Gallery, Tehran, 1976
- The Sheikh Gallery, Tehran, 1976
- The Naghsh Gallery, Tehran, 1975

=== Group exhibitions ===
- Museum of Contemporary Arts, Tehran, 1983
- Organizer of the First Group Exhibition of Iranian Caricaturists at Iran-America Society, Tehran, 1978
- The Goethe Institute, Tehran, 1978
- The Takht-e Jamshid Gallery, Tehran, 1977
- The Naghsh Gallery, Tehran, 1977
- The Obeid Gallery, Tehran University, 1976
- Joint Exhibition with Canadian Caricaturists at 'The House of Iran', Montreal, 1976

=== Participation in International Exhibitions of Caricature ===
- Japan, Iran, 1995
- Turkey, Japan, Italy, 1994
- Turkey, France, Italy, Japan, Iran, 1993
- Japan, Turkey, 1992
- Japan, Turkey, Belgium, 1991
- Japan, Turkey, Italy, France, 1990
- Japan, Netherlands, Belgium, Italy, 1989
- Turkey, Belgium, Japan, 1989
- Japan, Canada, Poland, Belgium, Turkey, 1987
- Turkey, Poland, Belgium, 1986
- Japan, Turkey, Belgium, Canada, 1985
- Japan, Turkey, Belgium, 1984
- Japan, Belgium, Poland, Netherlands, 1983
- Japan, Canada, 1982
- Greece, Yugoslavia, 1980
- Canada, Greece, 1987
- Canada, Yugoslavia, Italy, 1977
- Berlin, Poland, Canada, Yugoslavia, 1976

== Awards ==
- A recipient of a plaque of Appreciation from the Association of Critics and Writers of Iranian Cinema, 2017
- A recipient of a plaque of Appreciation and the Golden Pen Award from the 4th Festival of Film Books

by the House of Cinema (2014) as an outstanding writer and author of Reference Books.

- Honorary Award, House of Iranian Cinema Festival, 2007
- Many Diplomas from Various International Exhibitions of Caricature / 1975–1992
- Silver Medal and 200,000 yen, from Yomiuri Shimbun, Japan / 1983
- Bronze Medal, from Yomiuri Shimbun, Japan / 1982

== Contributions as a jury ==
- Jury member of the 1st and 4th International Tehran Cartoon Biennial – 1993, 1999.

== As a publisher and designer of books ==
- The Duties of Assistant Director – Translated and Adapted by Mohammad Haghighat – 1994
- Wind Blows Anywhere it Likes – by Babak Ahmadi – 1992
- Conducted by Morteza Hannaneh – by Touraj Zahedi – 1991
- Tarkovsky – by Babak Ahmadi – 1990
- Understanding Movies – Translated by Iraj Karimi – 1990
- Film Appreciation – Translated by Bahman Taheri – 1989
- Film as Film – Translated by Abdollah Tarbiat – 1989
- Literature and Cinema – a group work – 1989
- The Age of Comic Films – a group work – 1988
- Paradjanov – a group work – 1988
- Yasujiro Ozu – a group work – 1988
- François Truffaut – by Hamid Hodania – 1987
- Acting for Films – a group work – 1987
- The Characteristics and Aims of Film Criticism – 1986

And cover designs for numerous books

== Works in other newspapers and periodicals as a writer, caricaturist, and graphist ==
- Soroush Weekly, 1982
- Sanat-e Haml-o-Naghl, 1982
- Fokahyoun Weekly, 1981
- Tebb-o Darou, 1981
- Jahangard, 1980
- Ferdowsi Weekly, 1980
- Zan-e Rooz, 1980
- Pirouzi Monthly, 1980
- Kayhan, 1987
- Ayandegan, 1978
- Donya-ye Varzesh, 1977
- Javanan, 1977
- Talaash, 1977
- Rastakhiz, 1975
- Mardom, 1975
- Caricature, 1971
- Economic Desk of Iranian Television / 1982–1989
- Essays, articles, and art reviews in various papers/ 1970–1995
- Mehrabi, Massoud (2006). "A Bed and Several Dreams: A Short History of Iranian Cinema". Cineaste. 31 (3): 38–47. JSTOR 41690005.

== Notes ==
- Udden, James (2014). "The Other Film International". Film International. 12 (3): 96–105. doi:10.1386/fiin.12.3.96_1.
