= Amirabad Rural District (Kamyaran County) =

Rural district in Kurdistan province, Iran

Amirabad Rural District Persian: دهستان اميرآباد
- Rural District
- Location within Iran Location within Iran Kurdistan
- Coordinates: 35°02′00″N 47°11′02″E
- Country: Iran
- Province: Kurdistan
- County: Kamyaran
- District: Muchesh
- Capital: Muchesh

Population (2016)
  - Total: 5,517
- Time zone: UTC+3:30 (IRST)

Amirabad Rural District (Persian: دهستان اميرآباد) is in Muchesh District of Kamyaran County, Kurdistan province, Iran. It is administered from the city of Muchesh.

== Demographics ==
=== Population ===
At the time of the 2006 National Census, the rural district's population was 7,330 in 1,727 households. There were 6,518 inhabitants in 1,805 households at the following census of 2011. The 2016 census measured the population of the rural district as 5,517 in 1,701 households. The most populous of its 24 villages was Marenj, with 887 people.
