= Avalan Rural District =

Rural district in Kurdistan province, Iran

Avalan Rural District Persian: دهستان عوالان
- Rural District
- Location within Iran Location within Iran Kurdistan
- Coordinates: 35°00′23″N 46°56′02″E
- Country: Iran
- Province: Kurdistan
- County: Kamyaran
- District: Muchesh
- Capital: Noshur-e Sofla

Population (2016)
  - Total: 2,401
- Time zone: UTC+3:30 (IRST)

Avalan Rural District (Persian: دهستان عوالان) is in Muchesh District of Kamyaran County, Kurdistan province, Iran. Its capital is the village of Noshur-e Sofla.

== Demographics ==
=== Population ===
At the time of the 2006 National Census, the rural district's population was 3,628 in 918 households. There were 3,224 inhabitants in 905 households at the following census of 2011. The 2016 census measured the population of the rural district as 2,401 in 753 households. The most populous of its 17 villages was Noshur-e Sofla, with 502 people.
