= Gavrud Rural District (Kamyaran County) =

Rural district in Kurdistan province, Iran

Gavrud Rural District Persian: دهستان گاورود
- Rural District
- Location within Iran Location within Iran Kurdistan
- Coordinates: 34°59′35″N 46°49′29″E
- Country: Iran
- Province: Kurdistan
- County: Kamyaran
- District: Muchesh
- Capital: Kuleh Sareh

Population (2016)
  - Total: 6,459
- Time zone: UTC+3:30 (IRST)

Gavrud Rural District (Persian: دهستان گاورود) is in Muchesh District of Kamyaran County, Kurdistan province, Iran. Its capital is the village of Kuleh Sareh.

== Demographics ==
=== Population ===
At the time of the 2006 National Census, the rural district's population was 11,304 in 2,659 households. There were 10,754 inhabitants in 2,942 households at the following census of 2011. The 2016 census measured the population of the rural district as 6,459 in 1,927 households. The most populous of its 11 villages was Tay, with 1,489 people.
