= Sursur Rural District =

Rural district in Kurdistan province, Iran

Sursur Rural District Persian: دهستان سورسور
- Rural District
- Location within Iran Location within Iran Kurdistan
- Coordinates: 34°57′07″N 47°04′00″E
- Country: Iran
- Province: Kurdistan
- County: Kamyaran
- District: Muchesh
- Capital: Yusofabad

Population (2016)
  - Total: 4,168
- Time zone: UTC+3:30 (IRST)

Sursur Rural District (Persian: دهستان سورسور) is in Muchesh District of Kamyaran County, Kurdistan province, Iran. Its capital is the village of Yusofabad.

== Demographics ==
=== Population ===
At the time of the 2006 National Census, the rural district's population was 5,674 in 1,370 households. There were 4,658 inhabitants in 1,349 households at the following census of 2011. The 2016 census measured the population of the rural district as 4,168 in 1,288 households. The most populous of its 34 villages was Khamesan, with 1,405 people.
