= Muchesh District =

District in Kurdistan province, Iran

Muchesh District Persian: بخش موچش
- District
- Location within Iran Location within Iran Kurdistan
- Coordinates: 35°00′46″N 47°00′56″E
- Country: Iran
- Province: Kurdistan
- County: Kamyaran
- Capital: Muchesh

Population (2016)
  - Total: 21,915
- Time zone: UTC+3:30 (IRST)

Muchesh District (Persian: بخش موچش) is in Kamyaran County, Kurdistan province, Iran. Its capital is the city of Muchesh.

== Demographics ==
=== Population ===
At the time of the 2006 National Census, the district's population was 30,884 in 7,443 households. The following census in 2011 counted 28,602 people in 7,968 households. The 2016 census measured the population of the district as 21,915 inhabitants in 6,716 households.

=== Administrative divisions ===
Muchesh District Population
Administrative Divisions	2006	2011	2016
Amirabad RD	7,330	6,518	5,517
Avalan RD	3,626	3,224	2,401
Gavrud RD	11,304	10,754	6,459
Sursur RD	5,674	4,658	4,168
Muchesh (city)	2,950	3,448	3,370
Total	30,884	28,602	21,915
RD = Rural District
