= 2024–25 Persepolis W.F.C. season =

Persepolis (Women)
2024–25 season
- President: Reza Darvish
- Head coach: Shadi Rezaei
- Stadium: Derafshifar Stadium
- 1st Division League: Winners
- Top goalscorer: Fatemeh Safarastgoo (9)
- Biggest win: 5–0 vs Fara Isatis Karan
- Biggest defeat: 1–2 vs Fara Isatis Karan; 0–1 vs Mehregan Pardis; 0–1 vs Foolad
Home colours	Away colours	Third colours

The 2024–25 season is the first season of the Persepolis W.F.C. in Iranian women's football after the Islamic Revolution. By purchasing the license of Akoo Kermanshah, Persepolis women's team were able to return to Iranian women's football after years of absence. In this season, Persepolis became the champions of the Iran Women's Football 1st Division League and secured promotion to the Kowsar League. Moreover, Fatemeh Safarastgoo, with 9 goals, claimed the top scorer title of the competition.

== Technical staff ==
=== Rezaei staff ===
Position	Staff
Head coach	(Iran) Shadi Rezaei
Assistant coach	(Iran) Negin Pakdel (Iran) Mahshad Shabani
Goalkeeping coach	(Iran) Zeinab Saberi
Doctor	(Iran) Golzar Khaledian
Physiotherapist	(Iran) Maral Esmaeilinia
Team Manager	(Iran) Hoda Khoshbayan
Team Supervisor	(Iran) Parvaneh Khalajollahbakhsh
Photographer	(Iran) Ghazal Khoddam
Support	(Iran) Fariba Zarghani

== Squad ==
No.	Pos.	Nat.	Name	Age	Since	App.	Goals	Ends	Signed from	Notes
Goalkeepers
1	GK	(Iran)	Parisa Geravandi	28	2024	4	0		(Turkey) Ataşehir Belediyespor	
12	GK	(Iran)	Mobina Khodadadi	25	2024	9	0		Ava Tehran	
98	GK	(Iran)	Zahra Khorram	18	2024	0	0		Ava Tehran	
99	GK	(Iran)	Hananeh Afradi	19	2024	1	0		Tika	
Defenders
2	DF	(Iran)	Hanieh Taleghani	20	2024	8	0			
4	DF	(Iran)	Zahra Javanmardi	20	2024	13	0		Fara Isatis Karan	
5	DF	(Iran)	Nadia Bahmani	28	2024	10	0			
6	DF	(Iran)	Mahdieh Mostafaei	24	2024	1	0			
13	DF	(Iran)	Mohaddeseh Amiri	—	2024	11	0		Palayesh Gaz Ilam	
16	DF	(Iran)	Narjes Tayebi	18	2024	13	0		Fara Isatis Karan	
19	DF	(Iran)	Matina Zamani	28	2024	2	0			
23	DF	(Iran)	Aylar Gholami	—	2024	11	0		Ava Tehran	
90	DF	(Iran)	Zahra Omidi	16	2024	10	1		Tam Isfahan	
Midfielders
7	MF	(Iran)	Fatemeh Amiri	23	2024	13	2			
14	MF	(Iran)	Maryam Safarastgoo	21	2024	13	0		Fara Isatis Karan	
17	MF	(Iran)	Baran Doostvandi	17	2024	2	0			
20	MF	(Iran)	Narges Gholamzadeh	17	2024	4	0			
24	MF	(Iran)	Zilan Moradi	21	2024	10	0			
26	MF	(Iran)	Zahra Pourrostami	17	2024	6	0			
44	MF	(Iran)	Nazanin Zahra Ghasemi	17	2024	1	0			
Forwards
8	FW	(Iran)	Sogand Raji	18	2024	12	2		Malavan	
9	FW	(Iran)	Aida Sedaghatzadeh	22	2024	6	1			
10	FW	(Iran)	Fatemeh Ghasemi	23	2024	6	4		(Turkey) Ataşehir Belediyespor	
11	FW	(Iran)	Hajar Ghorbani	21	2024	13	5		Fara Isatis Karan	
18	FW	(Iran)	Kiana Palizpisheh	—	2024	5	0			
21	FW	(Iran)	Fatemeh Safarastgoo	21	2024	13	9		Fara Isatis Karan	
30	FW	(Iran)	Helia Seiri	19	2024	1	0			
87	FW	(Iran)	Zhino Salehi	16	2024	2	0			
Players left the club during the season
25	MF	(Iran)	Aysan Goudarzi	—	2024	0	0		Tika	

Last updated: 8 February 2025.

== Pre-season and friendlies ==
=== Pre-season ===
Win Draw Loss Fixtures

1 November 2024 Friendly	Persepolis	3–0	Tika	Tehran
		Report		Stadium: Derafshifar Stadium

== Competitions ==
=== Overview ===
Competition	First match	Last match	Starting round	Final position	Record							
Competition	First match	Last match	Starting round	Final position	Pld	W	D	L	GF	GA	GD	Win %
1st Division League	14 November 2024	8 February 2025	Matchday 1	Winners	13	9	1	3	24	6	+18	69.23
Total					13	9	1	3	24	6	+18	69.23

Source: Competitions

=== 1st Division League ===
==== League Table ====
Pos	Team	Pld	W	D	L	GF	GA	GD	Pts	Qualification or relegation
1	Persepolis	10	7	1	2	18	4	+14	22	Advance to Play-off stage
2	Fara Isatis Karan	10	6	2	2	11	10	+1	20	Advance to Play-off stage
3	Pas Hamedan	10	3	4	3	11	7	+4	13	
4	Varesh Nowshahr	10	3	4	3	11	10	+1	13	
5	Mehregan Pardis	10	2	3	5	8	16	−8	9	
6	Shaho Kamyaran	10	1	2	7	11	23	−12	5	

Updated to match(es) played on 23 January 2025. Source:
Rules for classification: 1) Points; 2) Head-to-head points; 3) Head-to-head goal difference; 4) Goal difference; 5) Goals scored; 6) Fair-play points
(Note: Head-to-head record is used only after all the matches between the teams in question have been played).

==== Results summary ====
Overall								Home						Away					
Pld	W	D	L	GF	GA	GD	Pts	W	D	L	GF	GA	GD	W	D	L	GF	GA	GD
10	7	1	2	18	4	+14	22	3	1	1	9	3	+6	4	0	1	9	1	+8

==== Results by round ====
Round	1	2	3	4	5	6	7	8	9	10
Ground	A	H	A	A	H	H	A	H	H	A
Result	L	W	W	W	D	W	W	W	L	W
Position	4	2	2	1	1	1	1	1	1	1
Points	0	3	6	9	10	13	16	19	19	22

A = Away; H = Home; W = Win; D = Draw; L = Loss

==== Matches ====
Win Draw Loss Postponed

Date Round	Home	Score	Away	Location

14 November 2024 1	Mehregan Pardis	1–0	Persepolis	Tehran
15:00 IRST (UTC+03:30)	Rostamfarkhani 44'	Report		Stadium: Marghoobkar Stadium; Attendance: 200; Referee: Maedeh Jafari

22 November 2024 2	Persepolis	4–1	Shaho Kamyaran	Tehran
12:30 IRST (UTC+03:30)	Ghorbani; Sedaghatzadeh; F. Safarastgoo 62'	Report	Koohgard 63'	Stadium: Derafshifar Stadium; Referee: Zahra Raeisi

29 November 2024 3	Pas Hamedan	0–1	Persepolis	Hamadan
13:00 IRST (UTC+03:30)		Report	Raji	Stadium: Qods Stadium; Referee: Solaleh Javadi

6 December 2024 4	Fara Isatis Karan	0–5	Persepolis	Shiraz
13:00 IRST (UTC+03:30)		Report	Ghorbani; F. Safarastgoo	Stadium: Pars Stadium; Referee: Mahnaz Zokaee

13 December 2024 5	Persepolis	0–0	Varesh Nowshahr	Tehran
13:00 IRST (UTC+03:30)		Report		Stadium: Derafshifar Stadium; Referee: Elaheh Sinakaei

26 December 2024 6	Persepolis	2–0	Mehregan Pardis	Tehran
13:00 IRST (UTC+03:30)	F. Safarastgoo 31'; Raji 55'	Report		Stadium: Derafshifar Stadium; Referee: Raheleh Pashabadi

2 January 2025 7	Shaho Kamyaran	0–2	Persepolis	Kamyaran
13:00 IRST (UTC+03:30)		Report	F. Safarastgoo	Stadium: Kamyaran Azadi Stadium; Referee: Solaleh Javadi

9 January 2025 8	Persepolis	2–0	Pas Hamedan	Tehran
11:30 IRST (UTC+03:30)	F. Ghasemi 43'; Omidi 88'	Report		Stadium: Derafshifar Stadium; Referee: Zohreh Eskandari

16 January 2025 9	Persepolis	1–2	Fara Isatis Karan	Tehran
13:00 IRST (UTC+03:30)	F. Safarastgoo 51'	Report	Rostami 32'; Nematizadeh 60'	Stadium: Derafshifar Stadium; Referee: Zahra Raeisi

23 January 2025 10	Varesh Nowshahr	0–1	Persepolis	Nowshahr
13:00 IRST (UTC+03:30)		Report	F. Ghasemi	Stadium: Shahid Nategh Nouri Stadium; Referee: Vajiheh Rafati

==== Play-off stage ====
===== Semi-finals =====
29 January 2025 First leg	Foolad	0–3	Persepolis	Ahvaz
13:00 IRST (UTC+03:30)		Report	F. Ghasemi; F. Amiri; M. Amiri (yellow card) (yellow-red card) 65'	Stadium: Takhti Stadium; Referee: Maedeh Jafari

3 February 2025 Second leg	Persepolis	0–1 (3–1 agg.)	Foolad	Tehran
13:00 IRST (UTC+03:30)		Report	Jamalpour 1'	Stadium: Derafshifar Stadium; Referee: Elaheh Sinakaei

===== Final =====
8 February 2025 Final	Persepolis	3–1	Fara Isatis Karan	Tehran
13:00 IRST (UTC+03:30)	F. Safarastgoo 10', 85' (pen.); F. Amiri 71'	Report	Omidi 90+5' (o.g.)	Stadium: Karegaran Stadium; Referee: Zohreh Eskandari

== Statistics ==
=== Overall ===
No.	Pos.	Nat.	Name	1st Division	
No.	Pos.	Nat.	Name	Apps	Goals
Goalkeepers
1	GK	(Iran)	Parisa Geravandi	4	0
12	GK	(Iran)	Mobina Khodadadi	8 (1)	0
98	GK	(Iran)	Zahra Khorram	0	0
99	GK	(Iran)	Hananeh Afradi	1	0
Defenders
2	DF	(Iran)	Hanieh Taleghani	6 (2)	0
4	DF	(Iran)	Zahra Javanmardi	13	0
5	DF	(Iran)	Nadia Bahmani	10	0
6	DF	(Iran)	Mahdieh Mostafaei	(1)	0
13	DF	(Iran)	Mohaddeseh Amiri	11	0
16	DF	(Iran)	Narjes Tayebi	13	0
19	DF	(Iran)	Matina Zamani	1 (1)	0
23	DF	(Iran)	Aylar Gholami	2 (9)	0
90	DF	(Iran)	Zahra Omidi	2 (8)	1
Midfielders
7	MF	(Iran)	Fatemeh Amiri	13	2
14	MF	(Iran)	Maryam Safarastgoo	12 (1)	0
17	MF	(Iran)	Baran Doostvandi	(2)	0
20	MF	(Iran)	Narges Gholamzadeh	1 (3)	0
24	MF	(Iran)	Zilan Moradi	1 (9)	0
26	MF	(Iran)	Zahra Pourrostami	1 (5)	0
44	MF	(Iran)	Nazanin Zahra Ghasemi	(1)	0
Forwards
8	FW	(Iran)	Sogand Raji	11 (1)	2
9	FW	(Iran)	Aida Sedaghatzadeh	6	1
10	FW	(Iran)	Fatemeh Ghasemi	6	4
11	FW	(Iran)	Hajar Ghorbani	8 (5)	5
18	FW	(Iran)	Kiana Palizpisheh	(5)	0
21	FW	(Iran)	Fatemeh Safarastgoo	13	9
30	FW	(Iran)	Helia Seiri	(1)	0
87	FW	(Iran)	Zhino Salehi	(2)	0
Players left the club during the season
25	MF	(Iran)	Aysan Goudarzi	0	0
Updated: 8 February 2025

=== Goal scorers ===
Rank	No.	Pos.	Nat.	Name	1st Division
1	21	FW	(Iran)	Fatemeh Safarastgoo	9
2	11	FW	(Iran)	Hajar Ghorbani	5
3	10	FW	(Iran)	Fatemeh Ghasemi	4
4	7	MF	(Iran)	Fatemeh Amiri	2
4	8	FW	(Iran)	Sogand Raji	2
5	9	FW	(Iran)	Aida Sedaghatzadeh	1
5	90	DF	(Iran)	Zahra Omidi	1
Totals					24
Updated: 8 February 2025

=== Goalkeeping ===
Rank	No.	Nat.	Name	1st Division		
Rank	No.	Nat.	Name	Apps	GA	CS
1	1	(Iran)	Parisa Geravandi	4	0	4
2	12	(Iran)	Mobina Khodadadi	8 (1)	6	3 (1)
3	99	(Iran)	Hananeh Afradi	1	0	1
4	98	(Iran)	Zahra Khorram	0	0	0
Totals				13 (1)	6	8 (1)
Last updated: 8 February 2025

=== Captains ===
Note: Numbers in parentheses indicate the number of times a player served as captain after the fixed captain was substituted.

Rank	No.	Pos.	Nat.	Name	1st Division
1	7	MF	(Iran)	Fatemeh Amiri	9
2	10	FW	(Iran)	Fatemeh Ghasemi	4
Totals					13
Updated: 8 February 2025
