= Darreh Veyan =

Darreh Veyan or Darreh Vian (Persian: دره ويان) may refer to:

- Darreh Vian, Divandarreh
- Darreh Veyan-e Olya, Kamyaran County
- Darreh Veyan-e Sofla, Kamyaran County
- Darreh Veyan-e Sheykh, Saqqez County
- Darreh Vian-e Khowshkeh, Saqqez County
