= ALK =

ALK or Alk may refer to:

== Airlines ==
- ALK Airlines, a Bulgarian charter airline
- Alaska Air Group (stock ticker symbol ALK)
- SriLankan Airlines (ICAO code ALK)

== Places ==
- Alk, Albania, a village
- Alk, Iran, a village in Kurdistan Province
- Alk-e Kohneh ("Old Alk"), a village in Kurdistan Province, Iran
- Aslockton railway station, Nottinghamshire, England (National Rail code ALK)

== Biology and medicine ==
- Anaplastic lymphoma kinase, a human gene
- Alk-, a root word used in organic chemistry
- ALK or ALK-Abelló, a Danish pharmaceutical company
- Automated lamellar keratoplasty, a type of eye surgery

== Vessels ==
- SS Alk, a German cargo ship in service 1928–45
- A sailing ship renamed as Albatross

== See also ==
- ALK1-7, an activin receptor-like kinase protein e.g. ALK1
