= Khanomabad =

Khanomabad (Persian: خانم اباد) may refer to:

- Khanomabad, Kermanshah, Kermanshah Province
- Khanomabad, Javanrud, Kermanshah Province
- Khanomabad, Ravansar, Kermanshah Province
- Khanomabad, Kurdistan
- Khanomabad, Qazvin
