= Lown =

Lown may refer to:

- Lown (surname)
- Lown-e Kohneh, a Kurdistan Province
- Lown-e Sadat, a Kurdistan Province
- Lown-Berkovits, a cardiac defibrillator waveform
- Lown–Ganong–Levine syndrome, a pre-excitation syndrome of the heart
- The Lown Institute

== See also ==
- Lun (disambiguation)
- Loon (disambiguation)
