= Asrabad, Kamyaran =

Asrabad عصر آباد
- Village
- Location within Iran
- Coordinates: 34°56′27″N 46°49′57″E
- Country: Iran
- Province: Kurdistan
- County: Kamyaran
- Bakhsh: Central
- Rural District: Zhavehrud

Population (2006)
  - Total: 251
- Time zone: UTC+3:30 (IRST)
  - Summer (DST): UTC+4:30 (IRDT)

Asrabad (Persian: عصر آباد, also Romanized as ‘Aşrābād; also known as 'Asadābād) is a village in Zhavehrud Rural District, in the Central District of Kamyaran County, Kurdistan Province, Iran. At the 2006 census, its population was 251, in 63 families. The village is populated by Kurds.
