= Hajji Shureh =

Hajji Shureh حاجي شوره
- Village
- Location within Iran
- Coordinates: 34°46′51″N 46°59′16″E
- Country: Iran
- Province: Kurdistan
- County: Kamyaran
- Bakhsh: Central
- Rural District: Bilavar

Population (2006)
  - Total: 226
- Time zone: UTC+3:30 (IRST)
  - Summer (DST): UTC+4:30 (IRDT)

Hajji Shureh (Persian: حاجي شوره, also Romanized as Ḩājjī Shūreh) is a village in Bilavar Rural District, in the Central District of Kamyaran County, Kurdistan Province, Iran. At the 2006 census, its population was 226, in 49 families. The village is populated by Kurds.
