= Gavaneh =

Gavaneh (Persian: گاوانه) may refer to:

- Gavaneh, Kermanshah
- Gavaneh-ye Hoseyn, Kurdistan Province
- Gavaneh-ye Sharif, Kurdistan Province
