= Yaghvasi =

Yaghvasi يغواسي
- Village
- Location within Iran
- Coordinates: 34°49′17″N 46°58′54″E
- Country: Iran
- Province: Kurdistan
- County: Kamyaran
- Bakhsh: Central
- Rural District: Bilavar

Population (2006)
  - Total: 316
- Time zone: UTC+3:30 (IRST)
  - Summer (DST): UTC+4:30 (IRDT)

Yaghvasi (Persian: يغواسي, also Romanized as Yaghvāsī) is a village in Bilavar Rural District, in the Central District of Kamyaran County, Kurdistan Province, Iran. At the 2006 census, its population was 316, in 81 families. The village is populated by Kurds.
