= Karreh Puvan =

Karreh Puvan كره پوان
- Village
- Location within Iran
- Coordinates: 34°48′45″N 47°04′39″E
- Country: Iran
- Province: Kurdistan
- County: Kamyaran
- Bakhsh: Central
- Rural District: Bilavar

Population (2006)
  - Total: 105
- Time zone: UTC+3:30 (IRST)
  - Summer (DST): UTC+4:30 (IRDT)

Karreh Puvan (Persian: كره پوان, also Romanized as Karreh Pūvān, Kareh Pūān, Karreh Pūyān, and Korrahpūyān; also known as Kārapīān and Kareh Booyan) is a village in Bilavar Rural District, in the Central District of Kamyaran County, Kurdistan Province, Iran. At the 2006 census, its population was 105, in 18 families. The village is populated by Kurds.
