= Mavian =

Mavian ماويان
- Village
- Location within Iran
- Coordinates: 34°50′56″N 46°50′14″E
- Country: Iran
- Province: Kurdistan
- County: Kamyaran
- Bakhsh: Central
- Rural District: Zhavehrud

Population (2006)
  - Total: 99
- Time zone: UTC+3:30 (IRST)
  - Summer (DST): UTC+4:30 (IRDT)

Mavian (Persian: ماويان, also Romanized as Māvīān and Māveyān) is a village in Zhavehrud Rural District, in the Central District of Kamyaran County, Kurdistan Province, Iran. At the 2006 census, its population was 99, in 24 families. The village is populated by Kurds.
