= Kani Hangah =

Kani Hangah كاني هنگه
- Village
- Location within Iran
- Coordinates: 34°51′49″N 47°00′48″E
- Country: Iran
- Province: Kurdistan
- County: Kamyaran
- Bakhsh: Central
- Rural District: Bilavar

Population (2006)
  - Total: 35
- Time zone: UTC+3:30 (IRST)
  - Summer (DST): UTC+4:30 (IRDT)

Kani Hangah (Persian: كاني هنگه, also Romanized as Kānī Hangah) is a village in Bilavar Rural District, in the Central District of Kamyaran County, Kurdistan Province, Iran. At the 2006 census, its population was 35, in 8 families. The village is populated by Kurds.
