= Yuzidar =

Yuzidar يوزيدر
- Village
- Location within Iran
- Coordinates: 35°01′38″N 46°38′14″E
- Country: Iran
- Province: Kurdistan
- County: Kamyaran
- Bakhsh: Central
- Rural District: Zhavehrud

Population (2006)
  - Total: 675
- Time zone: UTC+3:30 (IRST)
  - Summer (DST): UTC+4:30 (IRDT)

Yuzidar (Persian: يوزيدر, also romanized as Yūzīdar, Yowzīdar, and Yūzī Dar; also known as Vazeh Dar and Wazeh Dar) is a village in Zhavehrud Rural District, in the Central District of Kamyaran County, Kurdistan Province, Iran. At the 2006 census, its population was 675, in 150 families. The village is populated by Kurds.
