= Qaleh Lan =

Qaleh Lan قلعه لان
- Village
- Location within Iran
- Coordinates: 34°47′03″N 47°07′09″E
- Country: Iran
- Province: Kurdistan
- County: Kamyaran
- Bakhsh: Central
- Rural District: bilavar

Population (2006)
  - Total: 225
- Time zone: UTC+3:30 (IRST)
  - Summer (DST): UTC+4:30 (IRDT)

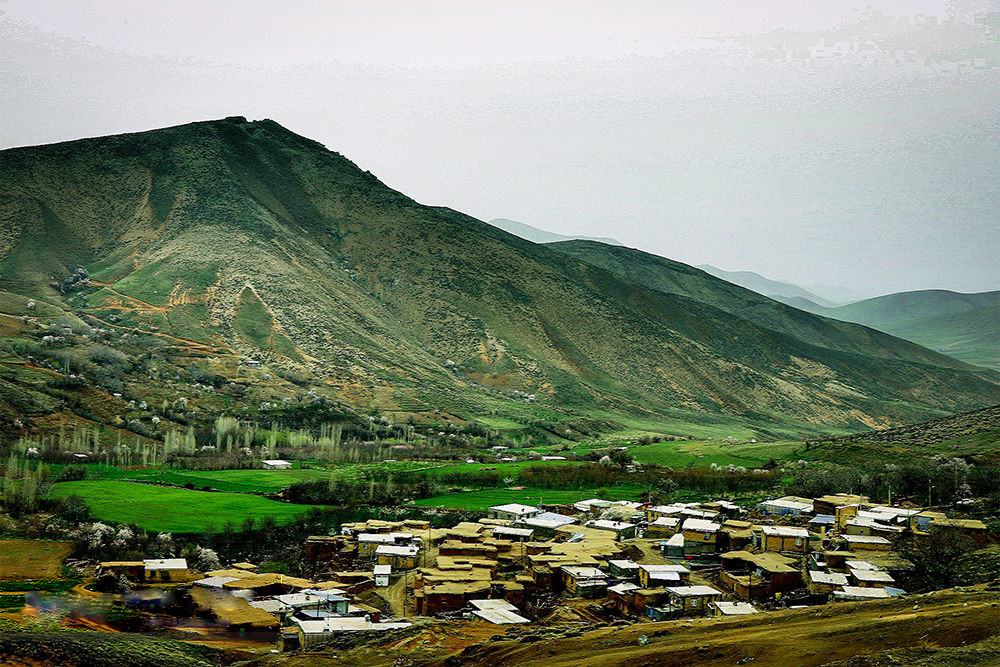
Qaleh Lan

Qaleh Lan (Persian: قلعه لان, also Romanized as Qal‘eh Lān) is a village in bilavar Rural District, in the Central District of Kamyaran County, Kurdistan Province, Iran. At the 2006 census, its population was around 225, in 50 families.
