= Yakhteh Khan =

Yakhteh Khan يخته خان
- Village
- Location within Iran
- Coordinates: 34°53′05″N 46°56′17″E
- Country: Iran
- Province: Kurdistan
- County: Kamyaran
- Bakhsh: Central
- Rural District: Bilavar

Population (2006)
  - Total: 122
- Time zone: UTC+3:30 (IRST)
  - Summer (DST): UTC+4:30 (IRDT)

Yakhteh Khan (Persian: يخته خان, also Romanized as Yakhteh Khān; also known as Yakhteh Khāneh) is a village in Bilavar Rural District, in the Central District of Kamyaran County, Kurdistan Province, Iran. At the 2006 census, its population was 122, in 30 families. The village is populated by Kurds.
