= Takht-e Zangi =

Takht-e Zangi تخت زنگي
- Village
- Location within Iran
- Coordinates: 34°52′07″N 46°45′03″E
- Country: Iran
- Province: Kurdistan
- County: Kamyaran
- Bakhsh: Central
- Rural District: Zhavehrud

Population (2006)
  - Total: 403
- Time zone: UTC+3:30 (IRST)
  - Summer (DST): UTC+4:30 (IRDT)

Takht-e Zangi (Persian: تخت زنگي, also Romanized as Takht-e Zangī and Takht Zangī; also known as Takht-e Rangī) is a village in Zhavehrud Rural District, in the Central District of Kamyaran County, Kurdistan Province, Iran. At the 2006 census, its population was 403, in 110 families. The village is populated by Kurds.

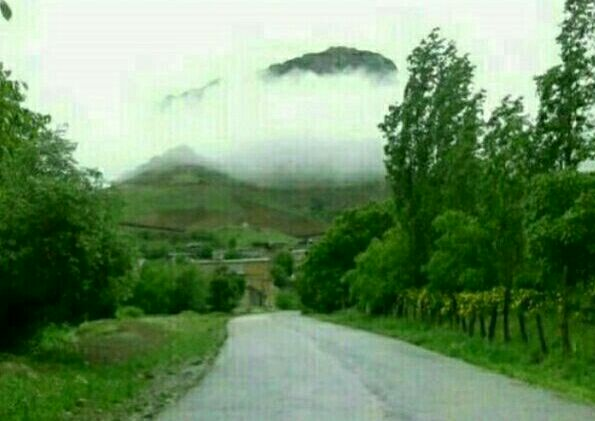
Road near Takht-e Zangi
