= Chersaneh =

Chersaneh چرسانه
- Village
- Location within Iran
- Coordinates: 34°54′25″N 46°43′21″E
- Country: Iran
- Province: Kurdistan
- County: Kamyaran
- Bakhsh: Central
- Rural District: Zhavehrud

Population (2006)
  - Total: 263
- Time zone: UTC+3:30 (IRST)
  - Summer (DST): UTC+4:30 (IRDT)

Chersaneh (Persian: چرسانه, also Romanized as Chersāneh) is a village in Zhavehrud Rural District, in the Central District of Kamyaran County, Kurdistan Province, Iran. At the 2006 census, its population was 263, in 69 families. The village is populated by Kurds.
