= Siviyeh =

Siviyeh سيويه
- Village
- Location within Iran
- Coordinates: 35°02′07″N 46°42′20″E
- Country: Iran
- Province: Kurdistan
- County: Kamyaran
- Bakhsh: Central
- Rural District: Zhavehrud

Population (2006)
  - Total: 36
- Time zone: UTC+3:30 (IRST)
  - Summer (DST): UTC+4:30 (IRDT)

Siviyeh (Persian: سيويه, also Romanized as Sīvīyeh, Sīvyah, Sīveyeh, and Sīvīeh; also known as Satūteh and Sotūdeh) is a village in Zhavehrud Rural District, in the Central District of Kamyaran County, Kurdistan Province, Iran. At the 2006 census, its population was 36, in 12 families. The village is populated by Kurds.
