= Bazvash =

Bazvash بزوش
- Village
- Location within Iran
- Coordinates: 34°59′37″N 46°41′56″E
- Country: Iran
- Province: Kurdistan
- County: Kamyaran
- Bakhsh: Central
- Rural District: Zhavehrud

Population (2006)
  - Total: 612
- Time zone: UTC+3:30 (IRST)
  - Summer (DST): UTC+4:30 (IRDT)

Bazvash (Persian: بزوش) is a village in Zhavehrud Rural District, in the Central District of Kamyaran County, Kurdistan Province, Iran. At the 2006 census, its population was 612, in 135 families. The village is populated by Kurds.
