= Zarrin Jub =

Zarrin Jub (Persian: زرين جوب) may refer to:

- Zarrin Jub, Kermanshah
- Zarrin Jub, Bijar, Kurdistan Province
- Zarrin Jub, Kamyaran, Kurdistan Province
- Zarrin Jub, Lorestan
