= Belan =

Belan may refer to:

== People ==
- Belan (surname), includes a list of notable people with the surname
- Belan Khamchiev (born 1960), Russian politician

== Places ==
- Belan, County Kildare, a civil parish in County Kildare, Ireland
- Belan, Kurdistan, a village in Kurdistan Province, Iran
- Belan, Powys, a hamlet in Powys, Wales, United Kingdom
- Belan-sur-Ource, a commune in the Côte-d'Or department of eastern France

== Other uses ==
- Belan (cooking), a word for a rolling pin in some South Asian languages
- Belan (grape), a variety of white wine grape also known as grenache blanc
- Belan River, in Uttar Pradesh, India
- Fort Belan, a coastal fortress in Gwynedd, North Wales, United Kingdom
