= Tavankesh =

Village in Kurdistan, Iran

Tavankesh توانكش
- Village
- Location within Iran
- Coordinates: 34°51′05″N 46°55′33″E
- Country: Iran
- Province: Kurdistan
- County: Kamyaran
- Bakhsh: Central
- Rural District: Shahu

Population (2006)
  - Total: 294
- Time zone: UTC+3:30 (IRST)
  - Summer (DST): UTC+4:30 (IRDT)

Tavankesh (Persian: توانكش, also Romanized as Tavānkesh) is a village in Shahu Rural District, in the Central District of Kamyaran County, Kurdistan Province, Iran. At the 2006 census, its population was 294, in 68 families. The village is populated by Kurds.
