= Choqa Beraleh =

Choqa Beraleh چقابراله
- Village
- Location within Iran
- Coordinates: 34°45′49″N 46°55′08″E
- Country: Iran
- Province: Kurdistan
- County: Kamyaran
- Bakhsh: Central
- Rural District: Bilavar

Population (2006)
  - Total: 256
- Time zone: UTC+3:30 (IRST)
  - Summer (DST): UTC+4:30 (IRDT)

Choqa Beraleh (Persian: چقابراله, also Romanized as Choqā Berāleh; also known as Choghā Berāleh) is a village in Bilavar Rural District, in the Central District of Kamyaran County, Kurdistan Province, Iran. At the 2006 census, its population was 256, in 63 families. The village is populated by Kurds.
