= Pashabad =

Pashabad پشاباد
- Village
- Location within Iran
- Coordinates: 34°58′07″N 46°44′45″E
- Country: Iran
- Province: Kurdistan
- County: Kamyaran
- Bakhsh: Central
- Rural District: Zhavehrud

Population (2006)
  - Total: 562
- Time zone: UTC+3:30 (IRST)
  - Summer (DST): UTC+4:30 (IRDT)

Pashabad (Persian: پشاباد, also Romanized as Pāshābād; also known as Pashehābād) is a village in Zhavehrud Rural District, in the Central District of Kamyaran County, Kurdistan Province, Iran. At the 2006 census, its population was 562, in 132 families. The village is populated by Kurds.
