= Tubreh Riz =

Tubreh Riz (Persian: توبره ريز) may refer to:

- Tubreh Riz, Kermanshah
- Tubreh Riz, Dehgolan, Kurdistan Province
- Tubreh Riz, Kamyaran, Kurdistan Province
