= Gazer Khani =

Gazer Khani گازرخاني
- Village
- Location within Iran
- Coordinates: 34°58′26″N 46°40′07″E
- Country: Iran
- Province: Kurdistan
- County: Kamyaran
- Bakhsh: Central
- Rural District: Zhavehrud

Population (2006)
  - Total: 466
- Time zone: UTC+3:30 (IRST)
  - Summer (DST): UTC+4:30 (IRDT)

Gazer Khani (Persian: گازرخاني, also Romanized as Gāzar Khānī and Gāzer Khānī; also known as Gazūrkhanī) is a village in Zhavehrud Rural District, in the Central District of Kamyaran County, Kurdistan Province, Iran. At the 2006 census, its population was 466, in 103 families. The village is populated by Kurds.
