= Misurab =

Misurab ميسوراب
- Village
- Location within Iran
- Coordinates: 34°56′01″N 46°40′44″E
- Country: Iran
- Province: Kurdistan
- County: Kamyaran
- Bakhsh: Central
- Rural District: Zhavehrud

Population (2006)
  - Total: 215
- Time zone: UTC+3:30 (IRST)
  - Summer (DST): UTC+4:30 (IRDT)

Misurab (Persian: ميسوراب, also Romanized as Mīsūrāb) is a village in Zhavehrud Rural District, in the Central District of Kamyaran County, Kurdistan Province, Iran. At the 2006 census, its population was 215, in 47 families. The village is populated by Kurds.
