= Kareh Gol =

Kareh Gol كره گل
- Village
- Location within Iran
- Coordinates: 34°51′39″N 46°49′21″E
- Country: Iran
- Province: Kurdistan
- County: Kamyaran
- Bakhsh: Central
- Rural District: Zhavehrud

Population (2006)
  - Total: 80
- Time zone: UTC+3:30 (IRST)
  - Summer (DST): UTC+4:30 (IRDT)

Kareh Gol (Persian: كره گل) is a village in Zhavehrud Rural District, in the Central District of Kamyaran County, Kurdistan Province, Iran. At the 2006 census, its population was 80, in 21 families. The village is populated by Kurds.
