= Tangivar =

Tangivar تنگي ور
- Village
- Location within Iran
- Coordinates: 35°00′16″N 46°37′44″E
- Country: Iran
- Province: Kurdistan
- County: Kamyaran
- Bakhsh: Central
- Rural District: Zhavehrud

Population (2006)
  - Total: 213
- Time zone: UTC+3:30 (IRST)
  - Summer (DST): UTC+4:30 (IRDT)

Tangivar (Persian: تنگي ور, also Romanized as Tangīvar and Tangī Var; also known as Tang Gerāv, Tang-i-Garao, Tangūr, and Tang Var) is a village in Zhavehrud Rural District, in the Central District of Kamyaran County, Kurdistan Province, Iran. At the 2006 census, its population was 213, in 44 families. The village is populated by Kurds.
