= Darreh Veyan-e Olya =

Darreh Veyan-e Olya دره ويان عليا
- Village
- Location within Iran
- Coordinates: 34°47′26″N 46°46′35″E
- Country: Iran
- Province: Kurdistan
- County: Kamyaran
- Bakhsh: Central
- Rural District: Shahu

Population (2006)
  - Total: 272
- Time zone: UTC+3:30 (IRST)
  - Summer (DST): UTC+4:30 (IRDT)

Darreh Veyan-e Olya (Persian: دره ويان عليا, also Romanized as Darreh Veyān-e ‘Olyā and Darreh Vīān-e ‘Olyā; also known as Darreh Veyān-e Bālā, Darreh Vīān, and Darreh Vīān-e Bālā) is a village in Shahu Rural District, in the Central District of Kamyaran County, Kurdistan Province, Iran. At the 2006 census, its population was 272, in 50 families. The village is populated by Kurds.
