= Zarrin Jub, Kamyaran =

Zarrin Jub زرين جوب
- Village
- Location within Iran
- Coordinates: 34°47′11″N 46°56′51″E
- Country: Iran
- Province: Kurdistan
- County: Kamyaran
- Bakhsh: Central
- Rural District: Bilavar

Population (2006)
  - Total: 267
- Time zone: UTC+3:30 (IRST)
  - Summer (DST): UTC+4:30 (IRDT)

Zarrin Jub (Persian: زرين جوب, also Romanized as Zarrīn Jūb; also known as Zarinjūr) is a village in Bilavar Rural District, in the Central District of Kamyaran County, Kurdistan Province, Iran. At the 2006 census, its population was 267, in 63 families. The village is populated by Kurds.
