= Maman, Kurdistan =

Maman مامن
- Village
- Location within Iran
- Coordinates: 34°49′38″N 47°00′32″E
- Country: Iran
- Province: Kurdistan
- County: Kamyaran
- Bakhsh: Central
- Rural District: Bilavar

Population (2006)
  - Total: 179
- Time zone: UTC+3:30 (IRST)
  - Summer (DST): UTC+4:30 (IRDT)

Maman (Persian: مامن, also Romanized as Māman; also known as Māmānd) is a village in Bilavar Rural District, in the Central District of Kamyaran County, Kurdistan Province, Iran. At the 2006 census, its population was 179, in 42 families. The village is populated by Kurds.
