= Vanderni-ye Sofla =

Vanderni-ye Sofla وندرني سفلي
- Village
- Location within Iran
- Coordinates: 34°47′34″N 47°00′33″E
- Country: Iran
- Province: Kurdistan
- County: Kamyaran
- Bakhsh: Central
- Rural District: Bilavar

Population (2006)
  - Total: 313
- Time zone: UTC+3:30 (IRST)
  - Summer (DST): UTC+4:30 (IRDT)

Vanderni-ye Sofla (Persian: وندرني سفلي, also Romanized as Vandernī-ye Soflá, Vendarnī Soflá, Vendarnī-ye Soflá, Vendernī Soflá, and Vondarnī-ye Soflá; also known as Āunāri, Āunārni, Ūnārenī Soflá, and Vandernī-ye Pā’īn) is a village in Bilavar Rural District, in the Central District of Kamyaran County, Kurdistan Province, Iran. At the 2006 census, its population was 313, in 73 families. The village is populated by Kurds.
