= Sar Riz =

Sar Riz سرريز
- Village
- Location within Iran
- Coordinates: 35°05′21″N 46°41′30″E
- Country: Iran
- Province: Kurdistan
- County: Kamyaran
- Bakhsh: Central
- Rural District: Zhavehrud

Population (2006)
  - Total: 984
- Time zone: UTC+3:30 (IRST)

Sar Riz (Persian: سرريز, also Romanized as Sar Rīz; also known as Sarīz) is a village in Zhavehrud Rural District, in the Central District of Kamyaran County, Kurdistan Province, Iran. At the 2006 census, its population was 984, in 236 families. The village is populated by Kurds.
