= Darvian =

Darvian (Persian: درويان) may refer to:

- Darvian-e Olya
- Darvian-e Sofla
