= Shahini, Iran =

Shahini (Persian: شاهيني) may refer to:

- Shahini, Kermanshah
- Shahini, Eslamabad-e Gharb, Kermanshah Province
- Shahini, Kurdistan
