= Afarian-e Sofla =

Afarian-e Sofla آفريان سفلي
- Village
- Location within Iran
- Coordinates: 34°54′00″N 46°50′35″E
- Country: Iran
- Province: Kurdistan
- County: Kamyaran
- Bakhsh: Central
- Rural District: Zhavehrud

Population (2006)
  - Total: 15
- Time zone: UTC+3:30 (IRST)
  - Summer (DST): UTC+4:30 (IRDT)

Afarian-e Sofla (Persian: آفريان سفلي, also Romanized as Āfarīān-e Soflá; also known as Āfarīān-e Pā'īn and Āfarīn-e Pā'īn) is a village in Zhavehrud Rural District, in the Central District of Kamyaran County, Kurdistan Province, Iran. At the 2006 census, its population was 15, in 5 families. The village is populated by Kurds.
