= Hashli =

Hashli (Persian: هشلي) may refer to:

- Hashli, Kamyaran
- Hashli, Sanandaj
