= Belan, Kurdistan =

Belan بلان
- Village
- Location within Iran
- Coordinates: 34°46′30″N 46°54′48″E
- Country: Iran
- Province: Kurdistan
- County: Kamyaran
- Bakhsh: Central
- Rural District: Shahu

Population (2006)
  - Total: 402
- Time zone: UTC+3:30 (IRST)
  - Summer (DST): UTC+4:30 (IRDT)

Belan (Persian: بلان, also Romanized as Belān) is a village in Shahu Rural District, in the Central District of Kamyaran County, Kurdistan Province, Iran. At the 2006 census, its population was 402, in 86 families. The village is populated by Kurds.
