= Varmahang =

Village in Kurdistan province, Iran

Varmahang Persian: ورمهنگ
- Village
- Location within Iran Location within Iran Kurdistan
- Coordinates: 34°47′45″N 46°53′06″E
- Country: Iran
- Province: Kurdistan
- County: Kamyaran
- District: Central
- Rural District: Shahu

Population (2016)
  - Total: 1,125
- Time zone: UTC+3:30 (IRST)

Varmahang (Persian: ورمهنگ) is a village in, and the capital of, Shahu Rural District of the Central District of Kamyaran County, Kurdistan province, Iran.

== Demographics ==
=== Ethnicity ===
The village is populated by Kurds.

=== Population ===
At the time of the 2006 National Census, the village's population was 987 in 218 households. The following census in 2011 counted 1,134 people in 296 households. The 2016 census measured the population of the village as 1,125 people in 315 households.
