= Kavaneh =

Kavaneh (Persian: كاوانه or كوانه), also rendered as Kavandeh, may refer to:

== Hamadan Province ==
- Kavaneh, Hamadan (كوانه - Kavāneh)

== Kurdistan Province ==
(كاوانه - Kāvāneh)

- Kavaneh-ye Hoseyn
- Kavaneh-ye Sharif
