= Hashli, Kamyaran =

Hashli هشلي
- Village
- Location within Iran
- Coordinates: 34°45′50″N 47°01′21″E
- Country: Iran
- Province: Kurdistan
- County: Kamyaran
- Bakhsh: Central
- Rural District: Bilavar

Population (2006)
  - Total: 97
- Time zone: UTC+3:30 (IRST)
  - Summer (DST): UTC+4:30 (IRDT)

Hashli (Persian: هشلي, also Romanized as Hashlī) is a village in Bilavar Rural District, in the Central District of Kamyaran County, Kurdistan Province, Iran. At the 2006 census, its population was 97, in 19 families. The village is populated by Kurds.
