= Tubreh Riz, Kamyaran =

Tubreh Riz توبره ريز
- Village
- Location within Iran
- Coordinates: 34°48′39″N 46°54′49″E
- Country: Iran
- Province: Kurdistan
- County: Kamyaran
- Bakhsh: Central
- Rural District: Shahu

Population (2006)
  - Total: 3,309
- Time zone: UTC+3:30 (IRST)
  - Summer (DST): UTC+4:30 (IRDT)

Tubreh Riz (Persian: توبره ريز, also Romanized as Tūbreh Rīz; also known as Tubreh and Turba Rez) is a village in Shahu Rural District, in the Central District of Kamyaran County, Kurdistan Province, Iran. At the 2006 census, its population was 3,309, in 824 families. The village is populated by Kurds.
