= Darreh Veyan-e Sofla =

Village in Kurdistan, Iran

Darreh Veyan-e Sofla دره ويان سفلي
- Village
- Location within Iran
- Coordinates: 34°47′14″N 46°47′03″E
- Country: Iran
- Province: Kurdistan
- County: Kamyaran
- Bakhsh: Central
- Rural District: Shahu

Population (2006)
  - Total: 113
- Time zone: UTC+3:30 (IRST)
  - Summer (DST): UTC+4:30 (IRDT)

Darreh Veyan-e Sofla (Persian: دره ويان سفلي, also Romanized as Darreh Veyān-e Soflá; also known as Darreh Veyān-e Pā'īn) is a village in Shahu Rural District, in the Central District of Kamyaran County, Kurdistan Province, Iran. At the 2006 census, its population was 113, in 20 families. The village is populated by Kurds.
