= Vanderni-ye Olya =

Vanderni-ye Olya وندرني عليا
- Village
- Location within Iran
- Coordinates: 34°46′57″N 47°02′20″E
- Country: Iran
- Province: Kurdistan
- County: Kamyaran
- Bakhsh: Central
- Rural District: Bilavar

Population (2006)
  - Total: 258
- Time zone: UTC+3:30 (IRST)
  - Summer (DST): UTC+4:30 (IRDT)

Vanderni-ye Olya (Persian: وندرني عليا, also Romanized as Vandernī-ye ‘Olyā, Vendarnī-ye ‘Olyā, and Vondarnī-ye ‘Olya) is a village in Bilavar Rural District, in the Central District of Kamyaran County, Kurdistan Province, Iran. At the 2006 census, its population was 258, in 68 families. The village is populated by Kurds.
