= Gashki =

Village in Kurdistan province, Iran

Gashki Persian: گشكي
- Village
- Location within Iran Location within Iran Kurdistan
- Coordinates: 34°53′46″N 46°45′22″E
- Country: Iran
- Province: Kurdistan
- County: Kamyaran
- District: Central
- Rural District: Zhavehrud

Population (2016)
  - Total: 146
- Time zone: UTC+3:30 (IRST)

Gashki (Persian: گشكي) (Note: Also romanized as Gashkī) is a village in, and the capital of, Zhavehrud Rural District of the Central District of Kamyaran County, Kurdistan province, Iran.

== Demographics ==
=== Ethnicity ===
The village is populated by Kurds.

=== Population ===
At the time of the 2006 National Census, the village's population was 132 in 33 households. The following census in 2011 counted 163 people in 42 households. The 2016 census measured the population of the village as 146 people in 40 households.
