= Alk-e Kohneh =

Alk-e Kohneh الك كهنه
- Village
- Location within Iran
- Coordinates: 34°46′46″N 46°49′36″E
- Country: Iran
- Province: Kurdistan
- County: Kamyaran
- Bakhsh: Central
- Rural District: Shahu

Population (2006)
  - Total: 157
- Time zone: UTC+3:30 (IRST)
  - Summer (DST): UTC+4:30 (IRDT)

Alk-e Kohneh (Persian: الك كهنه; also known as Alkeh-ye Kohneh) is a village in Shahu Rural District, in the Central District of Kamyaran County, Kurdistan Province, Iran. At the 2006 census, its population was 157, in 35 families. The village is populated by Kurds.
