= Lown-e Sadat =

Lown-e Sadat لون سادات
- Village
- Location within Iran
- Coordinates: 34°53′03″N 46°42′04″E
- Country: Iran
- Province: Kurdistan
- County: Kamyaran
- Bakhsh: Central
- Rural District: Zhavehrud

Population (2006)
  - Total: 1,316
- Time zone: UTC+3:30 (IRST)
  - Summer (DST): UTC+4:30 (IRDT)

Lown-e Sadat (Persian: لون سادات, also Romanized as Lown-e Sādāt) is a village in Zhavehrud Rural District, in the Central District of Kamyaran County, Kurdistan Province, Iran. At the 2006 census, its population was 1,316, in 312 families. The village is populated by Kurds.
