= Khanomabad, Kurdistan =

Khanomabad خانم آباد
- Village
- Location within Iran
- Coordinates: 34°46′33″N 46°56′48″E
- Country: Iran
- Province: Kurdistan
- County: Kamyaran
- Bakhsh: Central
- Rural District: Bilavar

Population (2006)
  - Total: 395
- Time zone: UTC+3:30 (IRST)
  - Summer (DST): UTC+4:30 (IRDT)

Khanomabad (Persian: خانم آباد, also Romanized as Khānomābād) is a village in Bilavar Rural District, in the Central District of Kamyaran County, Kurdistan Province, Iran. At the 2006 census, its population was 395, in 92 families. The village is populated by Kurds.
