= Vanderni =

Vandarni or Vendarni or Vondarni (Persian: وندرني) may refer to:

- Vanderni-ye Olya
- Vanderni-ye Sofla
