= Shirvaneh, Kamyaran =

Village in Kurdistan province, Iran

Shirvaneh Persian: شيروانه
- Village
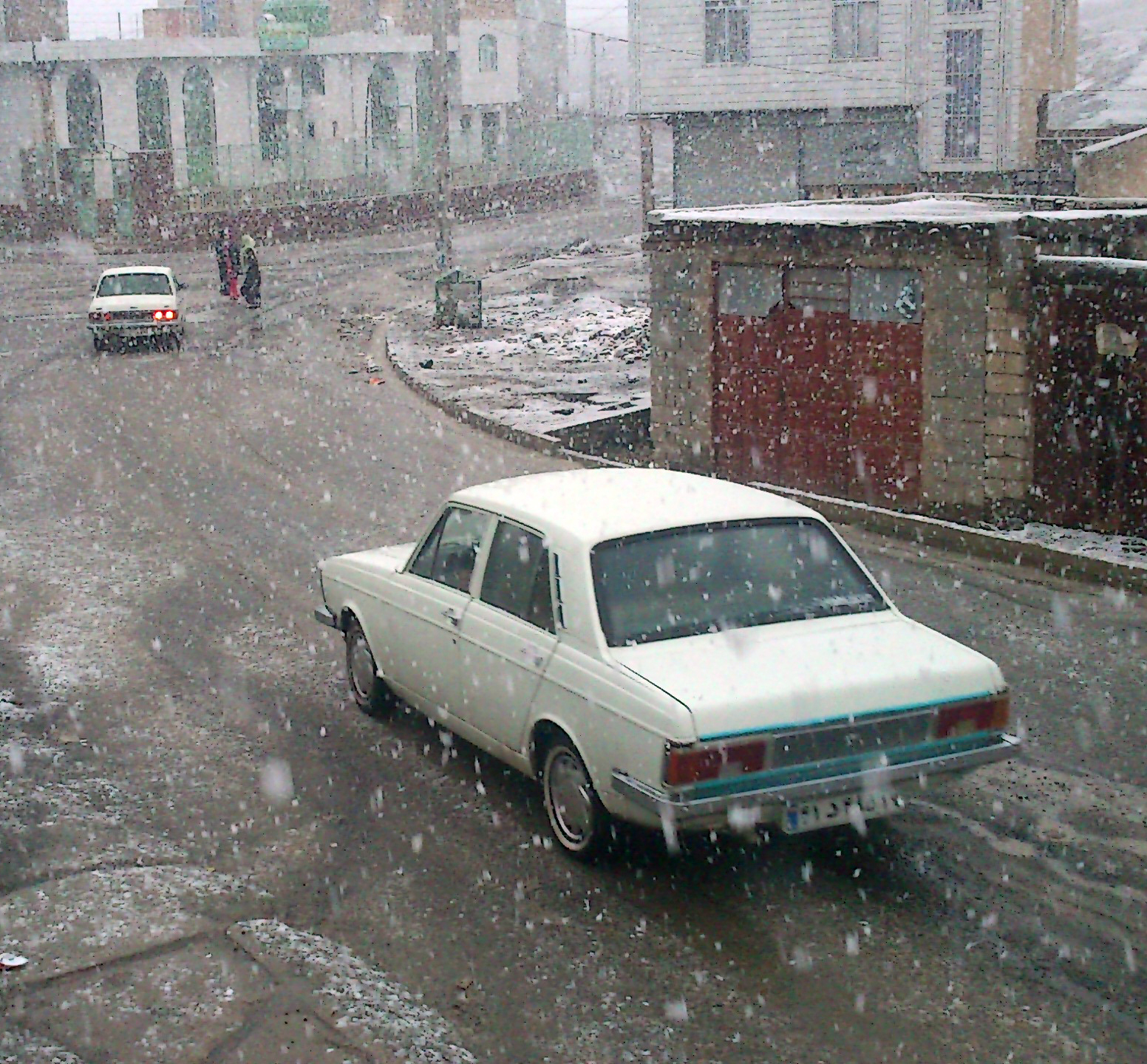
- Snowfall in Shirvaneh

- Location within Iran Location within Iran Kurdistan
- Coordinates: 34°47′46″N 46°57′54″E
- Country: Iran
- Province: Kurdistan
- County: Kamyaran
- District: Central
- Rural District: Bilavar

Population (2016)
  - Total: 2,092
- Time zone: UTC+3:30 (IRST)

Shirvaneh (Persian: شيروانه) (Note: Also romanized as Shīrvāneh) is a village in, and the capital of, Bilavar Rural District of the Central District of Kamyaran County, Kurdistan province, Iran.

== Demographics ==
=== Ethnicity ===
The village is populated by Kurds.

=== Population ===
At the time of the 2006 National Census, the village's population was 1,019 in 233 households. The following census in 2011 counted 1,624 people in 431 households. The 2016 census measured the population of the village as 2,092 people in 598 households. It was the most populous village in its rural district.
