= Kavaneh-ye Hoseyn =

Kavaneh-ye Hoseyn كاوانه حسين
- Village
- Location within Iran
- Coordinates: 34°54′12″N 46°44′17″E
- Country: Iran
- Province: Kurdistan
- County: Kamyaran
- Bakhsh: Central
- Rural District: Zhavehrud

Population (2006)
  - Total: 164
- Time zone: UTC+3:30 (IRST)
  - Summer (DST): UTC+4:30 (IRDT)

Kavaneh-ye Hoseyn (Persian: كاوانه حسين, also Romanized as Kāvāneh-ye Ḩoseyn; also known as Gāvāneh and Kāvdāneh) is a village in Zhavehrud Rural District, in the Central District of Kamyaran County, Kurdistan Province, Iran. At the 2006 census, its population was 164, in 43 families. The village is populated by Kurds.
