= Loom (disambiguation) =

A loom is a device used to weave cloth.

Loom or LOOM may also refer to:

== Arts ==
- Loom (video game), a graphical adventure game
- Light Opera of Manhattan, an Off-Broadway repertory theatre company
- Looms, fictional machines in the expanded universe of the television series Doctor Who; see Other
- Loom (band), an English rock band from Warwickshire
- The Loom, American rock band
- Loom (Katie Gately album), 2020
- Loom (Imagine Dragons album), 2024

== Other uses ==
- LOOM (ontology), a knowledge representation language
- Loom, Inc., a technology company that provides video communication software for work
- Loom, West Virginia, US
- Loyal Order of Moose, fraternal and service organization founded in 1888
- Rainbow Loom, a plastic toy loom used to weave black rubber bands into bracelets and charms
- Wiring loom, an electrical cable assembly or harness

== See also ==
- Heirloom
- Loon (disambiguation)
