= Shahini =

Shahini may refer to:

- Anjeza Shahini (b. 1987), Albanian singer
- Shahini, Iran (disambiguation), places in Iran
