= Alk, Iran =

Village in Kurdistan province, Iran

Alk Persian: الك
- Village
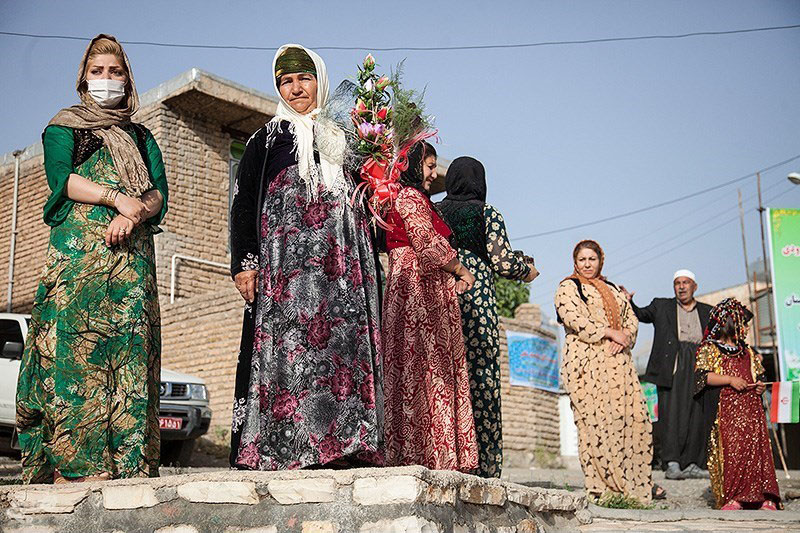

- Location within Iran Location within Iran Kurdistan
- Coordinates: 34°48′09″N 46°50′39″E
- Country: Iran
- Province: Kurdistan
- County: Kamyaran
- District: Central
- Rural District: Shahu

Population (2016)
  - Total: 1,303
- Time zone: UTC+3:30 (IRST)

Alk (Persian: الك) (Note: Also romanized as Alak and Alek) is a village in Shahu Rural District of the Central District of Kamyaran County, Kurdistan province, Iran.

== Demographics ==
=== Ethnicity ===
The village is populated by Kurds.

=== Population ===
At the time of the 2006 National Census, the village's population was 1,206 in 280 households. The following census in 2011 counted 1,340 people in 359 households. The 2016 census measured the population of the village as 1,303 people in 380 households. It was the most populous village in its rural district.
