= Afarian =

Afarian may refer to:

- Afarian-e Sofla, a village in Zhavehrud Rural District, in the Central District of Kamyaran County, Kurdistan Province, Iran
- Chris Afarian (born 1972), a former American soccer player
