= Shaim =

Shaim may refer to:

- Shaim, Iran
- Shaim, Russia
- 10014 Shaim, an asteroid
