= Sariz =

Sariz may refer to:

- Sariz, Iran (disambiguation)
- Sarız, Turkey
