= VBB =

VBB or variant may refer to:

- Verkehrsverbund Berlin-Brandenburg, a transport association run by public transport providers in the German states of Berlin and Brandenburg
- Sweco a.k.a. Swedish Consultants (formerly: AB Vattenbyggnadsbyrån a.k.a. "VBB"), engineering consultancy company
- Southeast Babar language (ISO 639 code: vbb)
- ALK Airlines (ICAO airline code: VBB)
- VBB (voltage), V_{BB}, a positive IC power-supply pin in FET ICs
