= Lown-e Kohneh =

Lown-e Kohneh لون كهنه
- Village
- Location within Iran
- Coordinates: 34°53′00″N 46°44′01″E
- Country: Iran
- Province: Kurdistan
- County: Kamyaran
- Bakhsh: Central
- Rural District: Zhavehrud

Population (2006)
  - Total: 227
- Time zone: UTC+3:30 (IRST)
  - Summer (DST): UTC+4:30 (IRDT)

Lown-e Kohneh (Persian: لون كهنه; also known as Loon, Lown, Lowneh Kown, Lown-e Kohan, Lūn, and Lūneh Kūn) is a village in Zhavehrud Rural District, in the Central District of Kamyaran County, Kurdistan Province, Iran. At the 2006 census, its population was 227, in 55 families. The village is populated by Kurds.
