= Kavaneh-ye Sharif =

Kavaneh-ye Sharif كاوانه شريف
- Village
- Location within Iran
- Coordinates: 34°54′12″N 46°44′17″E
- Country: Iran
- Province: Kurdistan
- County: Kamyaran
- Bakhsh: Central
- Rural District: Zhavehrud

Population (2006)
  - Total: 16
- Time zone: UTC+3:30 (IRST)
  - Summer (DST): UTC+4:30 (IRDT)

Kavaneh-ye Sharif (Persian: كاوانه شريف, also Romanized as Kāvāneh-ye Sharīf; also known as Gāvāneh and Kāvdāneh) is a village in Zhavehrud Rural District, in the Central District of Kamyaran County, Kurdistan Province, Iran. At the 2006 census, its population was 16, in 5 families. The village is populated by Kurds.
