= Maman, Iran =

Maman (Persian: ممان or مامن) may refer to:

- Maman, East Azerbaijan (ممان - Mamān)
- Maman, Kurdistan (مامن - Māman)
