= Shadi Rezaei =

Iranian football manager (born 1991)

- Rezaei managing Persepolis in 2024

Personal information
- Full name: Shadi Rezaei
- Date of birth: 15 May 1991 (age 35)
- Place of birth: Tehran, Iran

Managerial career
- Years: Team
- 2024–25: Persepolis

Shadi (Mina) Rezaei (Persian: شادی (مینا) رضایی; born 15 May 1991) is an Iranian football coach and former player. She served as the head coach of Persepolis Women's Football Club in the Iranian Women's Premier League. Under her management, the team achieved promotion to the top division before she was succeeded by Maryam Azmoun.

Rezaei's coaching achievements include winning the Iran Women's Football 2nd Division League championship, as well as two titles in the Iran Women's Football 1st Division League.

She is the first female head coach in the history of Persepolis F.C. since the Iranian Revolution of 1979.

== Personal life and early career ==
Shadi (Mina) Rezaei was born on 15 May 1991 in Tehran, Iran. She has spent her career working in Iranian women's football and futsal. She is also the founder of a girls' football academy called Tika in Tehran. She grew up in a sports-oriented family and developed a passion for football from a young age. In addition to her professional sports career, she holds a master's degree in Sports Physiology.

In a 2024 interview with the Persepolis website, Rezaei stated: "In 2011, when I was 20 years old, I obtained my first coaching license. I started coaching from that time and was a player-coach. I gave up playing relatively early due to my studies."

She also holds an AFC "A" coaching license.

She previously served as the head coach of Paykan Tehran, leading the team to a third-place finish in the 1st Division in the 2022 season. She also briefly coached Ava Tehran in the Premier League.

== Coaching career ==
=== Persepolis ===
In the 2024–25 season, Persepolis Women's Football Team was established for the first time since the Iranian Revolution. The club appointed Rezaei as the head coach, making her the first female manager in the club's post-revolution history.

Under her leadership, Persepolis won the 1st Division title and secured promotion to the Kowsar Women Football League.

== Honours ==
=== Head coach ===
Shahin Pars
2nd Division League: 1 title

Tika Tehran
1st Division League: 1 title

Persepolis
1st Division League: 1 title
