= Lun =

LUN or Lun may refer to:

- Logical unit number, in computer storage
- Lun, Croatia
- Lown-e Kohneh or Lūn, Iran
- Lün, a district in Mongolia's Central Province
- ISO 639-3 language code for the Lunda language
- Lun-class ekranoplan, a Soviet ground-effect vehicle
