= Sariz, Iran =

Sariz (Persian: سريز or ساريز) in Iran may refer to:

- Sariz, Kerman (ساريز - Sārīz)
- Sariz, Kurdistan (سريز - Sarīz)
