= 2024–25 Iran Women's Football 1st Division League =

Iran Women's Football 1st Division League
- Season: 2024–25
- Dates: 14 November 2024 – 8 February 2025
- Champions: Persepolis; 1st title
- Promoted: Persepolis; Fara Isatis Karan
- Relegated: Kohestan Technique; Shaho Kamyaran
- Matches: 65
- Goals: 161 (2.48 per match)
- Top goalscorer: Fatemeh Safarastgoo; Nastaran Mollahassan (9 goals)
- Biggest home win: Iranmehr 5–0 Kohestan Technique (29 November 2024)
- Biggest away win: Fara Isatis Karan 0–5 Persepolis (6 December 2024)
- Highest scoring: Persepolis 4–1 Shaho Kamyaran (22 November 2024); Shaho Kamyaran 2–3 Fara Isatis Karan (29 November 2024); Iranmehr 5–0 Kohestan Technique (29 November 2024); Varesh 4–1 Shaho Kamyaran (6 December 2024); Fara Isatis Karan 0–5 Persepolis (6 December 2024); Shaho Kamyaran 4–1 Mehregan Pardis (13 December 2024)
- Longest winning run: Persepolis (3 matches)
- Longest unbeaten run: Sepanta (10 matches)
- Longest losing run: Shaho Kamyaran; Kohestan Technique (4 matches)
- All statistics correct as of 4 February 2025. Promotion to Kowsar Women's League

The 2024–25 Iran Women's Football 1st Division League is the second-highest level of women's football in Iran after the Kowsar Women's League. The season is being held in 2024–25, with the league divided into two groups of six teams, playing over 10 weeks. At the end of the group stage, the top two teams from each group advanced to the play-off round.

From Group A, Persepolis Tehran and Fara Isatis Karan qualified, while from Group B, Sepanta Tehran and Foolad Khuzestan advanced to the play-offs. Sepanta finished the group stage as the only unbeaten team with 5 wins and 5 draws.

At the end of the play-off round, the two teams from Group A reached the final. The return leg of the play-offs, however, was surrounded by significant controversy. A penalty claim that was not awarded in the return match against Faraisatis was one of the points of contention, ultimately resulting in Sepanta, despite only one loss, failing to secure promotion to the top flight for that season.

== Draw ==
The draw for this season was held on 23 October 2024, with the presence of Gelareh Nazemi, the director of women's competitions at the Iranian League Organization, along with other officials and club representatives.

This edition of the league featured 12 teams divided into two groups of six. According to the draw, matches commenced on 14 November 2024, in a home-and-away format.

The match schedule is as follows:

== Match schedule ==
=== Group A ===
==== Week 1 ====
Week 1
Home	Score	Away
Pas Hamedan	3–0	Shaho Kamyaran
Varesh Mazandaran	1–0	Faraisatis Fars
Mehregan Pardis	1–0	Persepolis

Thursday, 14 November 2024	Pas Hamedan	3–0	Shaho Kamyaran
13:00	Faezeh Gholami Shiva Moulaei			Referee: Vajiheh Rafati

Thursday, 14 November 2024	Varesh Mazandaran	1–0	Faraisatis Cran Fars	Nateg Nouri Stadium, Nowshahr
14:45	Ghazal Saberi			Referee: Zahra Ghiasvand

Thursday, 14 November 2024	Mehregan Pardis	1–0	Persepolis	Marghoubkār Stadium, Tehran
15:00	Masoumeh Rostamfarokhani			Referee: Mahsa Ghorbani

==== Week 2 ====
Week 2
Home	Score	Away
Varesh Mazandaran	0–2	Pas Hamedan
Faraisatis Fars	3–1	Mehregan Pardis
Persepolis	4–1	Shaho Kamyaran

Friday, 22 November 2024	Varesh Mazandaran	0–2	Pas Hamedan	Nateg Nouri Stadium
13:00			Bita Khazaei Faezeh Gholami	Referee: Elaheh Sinkaee

Friday, 22 November 2024	Faraisatis Cran Fars	3–1	Mehregan Pardis	Pars Stadium, Shiraz
13:00	Fatemeh-Zahra Mohseni Shida Rezaei		Ghazal Bahari	Referee: Rahleh Pashabadi

Friday, 22 November 2024
13:00
Persepolis
Hajar Ghorbani

Aida Sedaghat 

Safa Rastgoo
4–1

Shaho Kamyaran
Arisa Koohgard
Marghoubkār Stadium, Tehran
Referee: Zahra Reisi

==== Week 3 ====
Week 3
Home	Score	Away
Mehregan Pardis	1–1	Varesh Mazandaran
Shaho Kamyaran	2–3	Faraisatis Fars
Pas Hamedan	0–1	Persepolis

Friday, 29 November 2024	Mehregan Pardis	1–1	Varesh Mazandaran	Kargaran Stadium, Tehran
12:00	Melika Alizadeh	Report	Melina Aalian	Referee: Zahra Reisi

Friday, 29 November 2024	Shaho Kamyaran	2–3	Faraisatis Fars	Azadi Stadium, Kamyaran
13:00	Hasti Sohrabi Neda Rezapour	Report	70' Zahra Mohseni 90' Mahdis Rostami	Referee: Elaheh Sinkaee

Friday, 29 November 2024	Pas Hamedan	0–1	Persepolis	Qods Stadium, Hamedan
13:00		Report	Sogand Raji	Referee: Salaleh Javadi

==== Week 4 ====
Week 4
Home	Score	Away
Mehregan Pardis	0–0	Pas Hamedan
Varesh Mazandaran	4–1	Shaho Kamyaran
Faraisatis Fars	0–5	Persepolis

Friday, 6 December 2024	Mehregan Pardis	0–0	Pas Hamedan	Kargaran Stadium, Tehran
12:00				Referee: Zohreh Eskandari

Friday, 6 December 2024
14:30
Varesh Mazandaran
Melina Aalian

Hana Naeej 

Setayesh Feizrahimi
4–1

Shaho Kamyaran

Nateg Nouri Stadium, Nowshahr
Referee: Dorna Ghahremani

Friday, 6 December 2024	Faraisatis Fars	0–5	Persepolis	Pars Stadium, Shiraz
13:00			Hajar Ghorbani Fatemeh Safa Rastgoo	Referee: Mahnaz Zokaei

==== Week 5 ====
Week 5
Home	Score	Away
Shaho Kamyaran	4–1	Mehregan Pardis
Pas Hamedan	0–0	Faraisatis Fars
Persepolis	0–0	Varesh Mazandaran

Friday, 13 December 2024	Shaho Kamyaran	4–1	Mehregan Pardis	Azadi Stadium, Kamyaran
13:00	Mahla Hamzeh Shina Mohammadi		Negar Zolfaghari	Referee: Vajiheh Rafati

Friday, 13 December 2024	Pas Hamedan	0–0	Faraisatis Fars	Qods Stadium Hamedan
13:00				Referee: Maedeh Jafari

Friday, 13 December 2024	Persepolis	0–0	Varesh Mazandaran	Dafchi Far Stadium, Tehran
13:00				Referee: Elaheh Sinkaee

==== Second half ====
The schedule for the return leg was announced on 11 December 2024 by the Iran Football League Organization.

==== Week 6 ====
Week 6
Home	Score	Away
Kamyaran Representative	1–1	Pas Hamedan
Faraisatis Cran Fars	1–0	Varesh Mazandaran
Persepolis	2–0	Mehregan Pardis

Thursday, 26 December 2024	Kamyaran Representative	1–1	Pas Hamedan
13:00	Roza Chetani		Fariba Hesarnoui

Thursday, 26 December 2024	Faraisatis Cran Fars	1–0	Varesh Mazandaran	Pars Stadium, Shiraz
13:00	Negin Azizadeh

Thursday, 26 December 2024	Persepolis	2–0	Mehregan Pardis	Dafchi Far Stadium, Tehran
13:00	Safa Rastgoo Sogand Raji

==== Week 7 ====
Week 7
Home	Score	Away
Pas Hamedan	2–2	Varesh Mazandaran
Kamyaran Representative	0–2	Persepolis
Faraisatis Cran Fars	1–0	Mehregan Pardis

Thursday, 2 January 2025	Pas Hamedan	2–2	Varesh Mazandaran	Qods Stadium, Hamedan
	Fariba Hesarnouei		Ghazal Saberi Setayesh Feizrahimi	Referee: Sahar Bibak

Thursday, 2 January 2025	Kamyaran Representative	0–2	Persepolis
			Safa Rastgoo	Referee: Salaleh Javadi

Thursday, 2 January 2025	Faraisatis Cran Fars	1–0	Mehregan Pardis	Kargaran Stadium, Tehran
12:00	Elaheh Karimi			Referee: Zahra Ghiasvand

==== Week 8 ====
Week 8
Home	Score	Away
Persepolis	2–0	Pas Hamedan
Varesh Mazandaran	1–1	Mehregan Pardis
Faraisatis Cran Fars	0–0	Kamyaran Representative

10 January 2025	Persepolis	2–0	Pas Hamedan	Dafchi Far Stadium, Tehran
13:00	Fatemeh Ghasemi Zahra Omidi			Referee: Zohreh Eskandari

10 January 2025	Varesh Mazandaran	1–1	Mehregan Pardis	Nateg Nouri Stadium, Nowshahr
13:00	Melina Aalian		Mebina Kheirkhah	Referee: Maedeh Jafari

10 January 2025	Faraisatis Cran Fars	0–0	Kamyaran Representative	Pars Stadium, Shiraz
13:00				Referee: Shabnam Ravambad

==== Week 9 ====
Week 9
Home	Score	Away
Pas Hamedan	3–0	Mehregan Pardis
Persepolis	1–2	Faraisatis Cran Fars
Kamyaran Representative	1–2	Varesh Mazandaran

Thursday, 16 January 2025	Pas Hamedan	3–0	Mehregan Pardis	Qods Stadium, Hamedan
13:30	Faezeh Gholami			Referee: Rahleh Pashabadi

Thursday, 16 January 2025	Persepolis	1–2	Faraisatis Cran Fars	Dafchi Far Stadium, Tehran
13:30	Safa Rastgoo		Mahdis Rostami Farzaneh Nematizadeh	Referee: Zahra Reisi

Thursday, 16 January 2025	Kamyaran Representative	1–2	Varesh Mazandaran
13:30	Arisa Koohgard		Bahar Panjgon Ghazal Saberipour	Referee: Fatemeh Eskanderzadeh

==== Week 10 ====
Week 10
Home	Score	Away
Varesh Mazandaran	0–1	Persepolis
Mehregan Pardis	3–1	Kamyaran Representative
Faraisatis Cran Shiraz	1–0	Pas Hamedan

Thursday, 23 January 2025	Varesh Mazandaran	0–1	Persepolis	Nateg Nouri Stadium, Nowshahr
13:30			Fatemeh Ghasemi	Referee: Vajiheh Rafati Javanbakht

Thursday, 23 January 2025
12:30
Mehregan Pardis
Melika Alizadeh

Masoumeh Rostamfarokhani 

Fatemeh Pirhaji
3–1

Kamyaran Representative

Kargaran Stadium, Tehran
Referee: Sahar Bibak

Thursday, 23 January 2025	Faraisatis Cran Fars	1–0	Pas Hamedan	Dastgheib Stadium, Shiraz
13:00	Negin Azizadeh			Referee: Maedeh Jafari

=== Group B ===
==== Week 1 ====
Week 1
Home	Score	Away
Iranmehr Rasht	1–3	Sepanta
Chabak Shiraz	0–3	Kohestan Teknik Kermanshah
Foolad Khuzestan	2–0	Toukan Maham Airia Tehran

Thursday, 14 November 2024	Iranmehr Rasht	1–3	Sepanta	Sardar Jangal Stadium, Rasht
15:00	Yalda Bashari		Maryam Mohammadhosseini Melika Naderi	Referee: Zohreh Eskandari

Chabak Shiraz	0–3	Kohestan Teknik Kermanshah	The match was declared 3–0 due to technical reasons.

Thursday, 14 November 2024	Foolad Khuzestan	2–0	Toukan Maham Airia Tehran	Takhti Stadium, Ahvaz
14:30	Parastoo Jamalpour Afsoon Mohammadi (penalty scored)			Referee: Zahra Reisi

==== Week 2 ====
Week 2
Home	Score	Away
Toukan Maham Airia Tehran	0–4	Chabak Shiraz
Foolad Khuzestan	1–2	Iranmehr Rasht
Kohestan Teknik Kermanshah	0–4	Sepanta

Friday, 22 November 2024
15:30
Toukan Maham Airia

0–4

Chabak Shiraz
Fatemeh Basta Vand

 Anis Dashtianpour

Sara Torki
Pitch 2, Kargaran Stadium, Tehran
Referee: Salaleh Javadi

Friday, 22 November 2024	Foolad Khuzestan	1–2	Iranmehr Rasht	Takhti Stadium, Ahvaz
13:00	Afsoon Mohammadi		Fatemeh Shekari Fatemeh Najafi	Referee: Maedeh Jafari

Friday, 22 November 2024
13:00
Kohestan Teknik Kermanshah

0–4

Sepanta
Maryam Mohammadhosseini

 Melika Naderi

Nastaran Mollaahsen
Vahdat Stadium, Kermanshah
Referee: Dorna Ghahremani

==== Week 3 ====
Week 3
Home	Score	Away
Iranmehr Rasht	5–0	Kohestan Teknik Kermanshah
Sepanta	1–1	Toukan Maham Airia Tehran
Chabak Shiraz	1–3	Foolad Khuzestan

Friday, 29 November 2024
13:00
Iranmehr Rasht
Sara Jafari

Fatemeh Shekari 

Zeinab Esmaeili
5–0
Report
Kohestan Teknik

Sardar Jangal Stadium, Rasht
Referee: Sahar Bibak

Friday, 29 November 2024	Sepanta	1–1	Toukan Maham Airia	Kargaran Stadium, Tehran
15:15	Nastaran Mollaahsen	Report	Matina Nik-Khoo	Referee: Parand Pourmirzabeygi

Friday, 29 November 2024	Chabak Shiraz	1–3	Foolad Khuzestan	Pars Stadium, Shiraz
13:00	Sara Torki	Report	Afsoon Mohammadi	Referee: Fatemeh Nasiri

==== Week 4 ====
Week 4
Home	Score	Away
Chabak Shiraz	2–0	Iranmehr Rasht
Foolad Khuzestan	0–0	Sepanta
Toukan Maham Airia Tehran	3–1	Kohestan Teknik Kermanshah

Friday, 6 December 2024	Chabak Shiraz	2–0	Iranmehr Rasht
13:00	Asma Sadat Mousavi Sara Torki			Referee: Rahleh Pashabadi

Friday, 6 December 2024	Foolad Khuzestan	0–0	Sepanta	Takhti Stadium, Ahvaz
13:00		Report		Referee: Ghazaleh Atefi

Friday, 6 December 2024
15:15
Toukan Maham Airia Tehran
Fatemeh Kazempour

Aso Haji Vand 

Mebina Moghari
3–1

Kohestan Teknik Kermanshah

Kargaran Stadium, Tehran
Referee: Elaheh Sinkaee

==== Week 5 ====
Week 5
Home	Score	Away
Sepanta	0–0	Chabak Shiraz
Iranmehr Rasht	3–1	Toukan Maham Airia Tehran
Kohestan Teknik Kermanshah	0–2	Foolad Khuzestan

Friday, 13 December 2024	Sepanta	0–0	Chabak Shiraz	Kargaran Stadium
13:00				Referee: Zahra Ghiasvand

Friday, 13 December 2024	Iranmehr Rasht	3–1	Toukan Maham Airia Tehran	Sardar Jangal Stadium
13:00	Hanieh Tankabani Shadi Tahmasebi Zeinab Esmaeili		Fatemeh Kazempour	Referee: Salaleh Javadi

Friday, 13 December 2024	Shahrdari Kermanshah	0–2	Foolad Khuzestan	Vahdat Stadium, Kermanshah
13:00		Report	83' Afsoon Mohammadi 86' Fatemeh Jamshidi	Referee: Rahleh Pashabadi

==== Second half ====
The schedule for the return leg was announced on 11 December 2024 by the Iran Football League Organization.

==== Week 6 ====
Week 6
Home	Score	Away
Sepanta	3–1	Iranmehr Rasht
Toukan Maham Airia	2–2	Foolad Khuzestan
Shahrdari Kermanshah	4–0	Chabak Shiraz

Thursday, 26 December 2024	Sepanta	3–1	Iranmehr Rasht	Kargaran Stadium, Tehran
12:00	Nastaran Mollaahsen		Zeinab Esmaeili

Thursday, 26 December 2024	Toukan Maham Airia	2–2	Foolad Khuzestan	Kargaran Stadium, Tehran
15:15	(o.g.) Fereshteh Rostami		Fatemeh Jamshidi Parastoo Jamali

Thursday, 26 December 2024	Shahrdari Kermanshah	4–0	Chabak Shiraz	Vahdat Stadium, Kermanshah
13:00	Fatemeh Yazdani Fatemeh Cheshmesefidi

==== Week 7 ====
Week 7
Home	Score	Away
Iranmehr Rasht	1–2	Foolad Khuzestan
Sepanta	2–2	Shahrdari Kermanshah
Chabak Shiraz	2–1	Toukan Maham Airia

Thursday, 2 January 2025	Iranmehr Rasht	1–2	Foolad Khuzestan	Sardar Jangal Stadium, Rasht
	Zahra Asgharzadeh 10'	Report	44' Afsoon Mohammadi Maryam Shomal-Nasab	Referee: Elaheh Sinkaee

Thursday, 2 January 2025	Sepanta	2–2	Shahrdari Kermanshah	Kargaran Stadium, Tehran
12:00	Sogand Soleimani Nastaran Mollaahsen		Fatemeh Yazdani	Referee: Vajiheh Rafati

Thursday, 2 January 2025	Chabak Shiraz	2–1	Toukan Maham Airia	Pars Stadium, Shiraz
13:00	Hanieh Khodaparasti Najmeh Loghaee		Fatemeh Kazempour	Referee: Fatemeh Nasiri

==== Week 8 ====
Week 8
Home	Score	Away
Shahrdari Kermanshah	0–0	Iranmehr Rasht
Foolad Khuzestan	1–0	Chabak Shiraz
Toukan Maham Airia	0–0	Sepanta

Thursday, 10 January 2025	Shahrdari Kermanshah	0–0	Iranmehr Rasht	Vahdat Stadium, Kermanshah
13:00				Referee: Fatemeh Nasiri

Thursday, 10 January 2025	Foolad Khuzestan	1–0	Chabak Shiraz	Takhti Stadium, Ahvaz
13:00	Kowsar Moradi			Referee: Zahra Reisi

Thursday, 10 January 2025	Toukan Maham Airia	0–0	Sepanta	Kargaran Stadium, Tehran
12:00				Referee: Elaheh Sinkaee

==== Week 9 ====
Week 9
Home	Score	Away
Iranmehr Rasht	2–0	Chabak Shiraz
Shahrdari Kermanshah	0–1	Toukan Maham Airia
Sepanta	2–0	Foolad Khuzestan

Thursday, 16 January 2025	Iranmehr Rasht	2–0	Chabak Shiraz	Sardar Jangal Stadium, Rasht
13:30	Shadi Tahmasebi Marjan Mojahdei	Report		Referee: Vajiheh Rafati Javanbakht

Thursday, 16 January 2025	Shahrdari Kermanshah	0–1	Toukan Maham Airia	Vahdat Stadium, Kermanshah
13:30			Mebina Moghari	Referee: Sahar Bibak

Thursday, 16 January 2025	Sepanta	2–0	Foolad Khuzestan	Kargaran Stadium, Tehran
14:00	Mohaddeseh Emami 27' Nastaran Mollaahsen	Report		Referee: Mahsa Mohammadjani

==== Week 10 ====
Week 10
Home	Score	Away
Chabak Shiraz	0–1	Sepanta
Foolad Khuzestan	2–1	Shahrdari Kermanshah
Toukan Maham Airia	3–0	Iranmehr Rasht

Thursday, 23 January 2025	Chabak Shiraz	0–1	Sepanta	Besat Stadium, Shiraz
13:30			Maryam Mohammadhosseini	Referee: Zohreh Eskandari

Thursday, 23 January 2025	Foolad Khuzestan	2–1	Shahrdari Kermanshah	Takhti Stadium, Ahvaz
13:30	Kobra Shahpouri Ghazal Momeni		Hadith Yari	Referee: Ghazaleh Atefi

Thursday, 23 January 2025	Toukan Maham Airia	3–0	Iranmehr Rasht	Kargaran Stadium, Tehran
15:15	Fatemeh Kazem Mebina Moghari			Referee: Rahleh Pashabadi

== League tables ==
Group 1

Pos	Team	Pld	W	D	L	GF	GA	GD	Pts	Qualification or relegation
1	Persepolis	10	7	1	2	18	4	+14	22	Advance to Play-off stage
2	Fara Isatis Karan	10	6	2	2	11	10	+1	20	Advance to Play-off stage
3	Pas Hamedan	10	3	4	3	11	7	+4	13	
4	Varesh Nowshahr	10	3	4	3	11	10	+1	13	
5	Mehregan Pardis	10	2	3	5	8	16	−8	9	
6	Shaho Kamyaran	10	1	2	7	11	23	−12	5	

Updated to match(es) played on 23 January 2025. Source: League Full Table
Rules for classification: 1) Points; 2) Head-to-head points; 3) Head-to-head goal difference; 4) Goal difference; 5) Goals scored; 6) Fair-play points
(Note: Head-to-head record is used only after all the matches between the teams in question have been played).

Group 2

== Play-off stage ==
The top two teams from each group qualified for the play-off stage. The semi-finals of this stage were contested over two legs (home and away).

Semi-finals
Fara Isatis Karan	2	1	3
Sepanta Tehran	0	2	2
Foolad	0	1	1
Persepolis	3	0	3

Final
Fara Isatis Karan	1
Persepolis	3

=== Semi-finals ===
==== First leg ====
Wednesday, 29 January 2025	Fara Isatis Karan	2–0	Sepanta Tehran	Pars Stadium, Shiraz
13:00	Shida Rezaei Atefeh Zarg-Zahi			Referee: Elaheh Sinkaee

Wednesday, 29 January 2025	Foolad	0–3	Persepolis	Takhti Stadium, Ahvaz
13:00				Referee: Maedeh Jafari

==== Second leg ====
Monday, 3 February 2025	Sepanta Tehran	2–1	Fara Isatis Karan	Kargaran Stadium, Tehran
13:00		Borna News; ISNA		Referee: Mahsa Mohammadjani

Monday, 3 February 2025	Persepolis	0–1	Foolad	Dafchi Far Stadium, Tehran
13:00		Asr Iran; Football 360	1' Parastoo Jamalpour	Referee: Elaheh Sinkaee

=== Final round ===
The draw for this round was held via webinar with Galareh Nazemi (Director of Women's Football Competitions) and Soraya Khaledi (a women's football official) present, after the qualifying teams were determined. Accordingly, the matches were scheduled to be held on Saturday, 8 February 2025.

==== Final ====
The teams in this stage secured promotion to the Kowsar League. The final match to determine the champion of this season was held in Tehran by mutual agreement of the two teams.

8 February 2025	Persepolis	3–1	Fara Isatis Karan	Kargaran Stadium, Tehran
15:00	Safa Rastgoo Amiri	Asr Iran; Varzesh 3 Khabar Varzeshi; Football 360	Goal

==== Third-place play-off ====
Disciplinary	Sepanta	3–0	Foolad Khuzestan

This match was scheduled to be played before the final, at 12:00 at the Kargaran Stadium in Tehran, but was cancelled at the request of Foolad. Sepanta was declared the winner of the match and finished in third place.

== See also ==
- 2024–25 Persian Gulf Pro League
- 2024–25 Kowsar Women's Football League
- 2024 Iran Women's Futsal Premier League
- 2024–25 Azadegan League
