= Shahini, Kurdistan =

Village in Kurdistan province, Iran

Shahini Persian: شاهيني
- Village
- Location within Iran Location within Iran Kurdistan
- Coordinates: 34°55′34″N 46°47′22″E
- Country: Iran
- Province: Kurdistan
- County: Kamyaran
- District: Central
- Rural District: Zhavehrud

Population (2016)
  - Total: 1,663
- Time zone: UTC+3:30 (IRST)

Shahini (Persian: شاهيني) (Note: Also romanized as Shāhīnī; also known as Shaīm and Shaīnī) is a village in Zhavehrud Rural District of the Central District of Kamyaran County, Kurdistan province, Iran.

== Demographics ==
=== Ethnicity ===
The village is populated by Kurds.

=== Population ===
At the time of the 2006 National Census, the village's population was 1,880 in 509 households. The following census in 2011 counted 1,895 people in 538 households. The 2016 census measured the population of the village as 1,663 people in 549 households. It was the most populous village in its rural district.
