= Belan (surname) =

Belan is a surname. Notable people with the surname include:

- Albert Belan (1930–2011), US Democratic politician
- Alexey Belan (born 1987), Russian-Latvian hacker
- Jaroslav Beláň (born 1981), Slovak soccer player
- Neno Belan (born 1960), Croatian rock musician
- Tatyana Belan (born 1982), Belarusian rhythmic gymnast
- Viktor Belan (born 1981), birth name of Dima Bilan, Russian singer
