= Zarrin Jub, Kermanshah =

Zarrin Jub زرين جوب
- Village
- Location within Iran
- Coordinates: 34°26′03″N 45°48′01″E
- Country: Iran
- Province: Kermanshah
- County: Sarpol-e Zahab
- Bakhsh: Central
- Rural District: Howmeh-ye Sarpol

Population (2006)
  - Total: 420
- Time zone: UTC+3:30 (IRST)
  - Summer (DST): UTC+4:30 (IRDT)

Zarrin Jub (Persian: زرين جوب, also Romanized as Zarrīn Jūb; also known as Zarkīnjū, Zarrīn Jow, Zarrīn Jū, and Zarrīnjū) is a village in Howmeh-ye Sarpol Rural District, in the Central District of Sarpol-e Zahab County, Kermanshah Province, Iran. At the 2006 census, its population was 420, in 85 families.
