= Alk- =

Chemistry prefix

The root alk- is used in organic chemistry to form classification names for classes of organic compounds which contain a carbon skeleton but no aromatic rings. It was extracted from the word alcohol by removing the -ol suffix. See e.g. alkyl, alkane.

The International Union of Pure and Applied Chemistry (IUPAC) nomenclature system is used to systematically identify organic compounds. Prefixes, suffixes, and infixes are known as organic chemistry affixes. These affixes provide details about the molecule's structure, such as the quantity of carbon atoms, the kind of carbon-to-carbon bonds, and the existence of functional groups.

The following are a few typical additions in organic chemistry: Prefixes

Hydrocarbon prefixes: These prefixes indicate the number of carbon atoms in a straight-chain alkane. Some examples include: meth- (1 carbon) eth- (2 carbons) prop- (3 carbons) but- (4 carbons) pent- (5 carbons) hex- (6 carbons) Alkyl group prefixes: These prefixes are used to name alkyl groups (chains of carbon atoms) that are attached to another molecule. They are formed by adding the suffix "-yl" to the hydrocarbon prefix. For example, a methyl group (CH3) is an alkyl group derived from methane (CH4). Halo prefixes: These prefixes are used to indicate the presence of a halogen atom (F, Cl, Br, or I) in a molecule. Some examples include: fluoro- (F) chloro- (Cl) bromo- (Br) iodo- (I) Suffixes

Hydrocarbon suffixes: These suffixes indicate the type of bonds between the carbon atoms in a molecule. Some examples include: -ane (all single bonds) -ene (at least one double bond) -yne (at least one triple bond). Functional group suffixes: These suffixes indicate the presence of a particular functional group in a molecule. Some examples include: -ol (alcohol) -al (aldehyde) -one (ketone) -oic acid (carboxylic acid) -amine (amine) -amide (amide) -ester (ester) Infixes

Cycloinfix: The prefix "cyclo-" is used to indicate that the carbon chain is cyclic (ring-shaped).

Other infixes: There are a few other infixes used in IUPAC nomenclature to indicate more complex structures, such as "spiro-" and "bicyclo-".
