= Khanomabad, Kermanshah =

Khanomabad خانم اباد
- Village
- Location within Iran
- Coordinates: 34°35′51″N 46°57′16″E
- Country: Iran
- Province: Kermanshah
- County: Kermanshah
- Bakhsh: Central
- Rural District: Miyan Darband

Population (2006)
  - Total: 604
- Time zone: UTC+3:30 (IRST)
  - Summer (DST): UTC+4:30 (IRDT)

Khanomabad (Persian: خانم اباد, also Romanized as Khānomābād) is a village in Miyan Darband Rural District, in the Central District of Kermanshah County, Kermanshah Province, Iran. At the 2006 census, its population was 604, in 140 families.
