= Shahini, Eslamabad-e Gharb =

Shahini شاهيني
- Village
- Location within Iran
- Coordinates: 34°02′48″N 46°48′44″E
- Country: Iran
- Province: Kermanshah
- County: Eslamabad-e Gharb
- Bakhsh: Central
- Rural District: Hasanabad

Population (2006)
  - Total: 400
- Time zone: UTC+3:30 (IRST)
  - Summer (DST): UTC+4:30 (IRDT)

Shahini (Persian: شاهيني, also Romanized as Shāhīnī; also known as Shāhīnī-ye Soflá) is a village in Hasanabad Rural District, in the Central District of Eslamabad-e Gharb County, Kermanshah Province, Iran. At the 2006 census, its population was 400, in 88 families.
