= Gav Bandeh =

Gav Bandeh گاوبنده
- Village
- Location within Iran
- Coordinates: 34°23′54″N 47°03′35″E
- Country: Iran
- Province: Kermanshah
- County: Kermanshah
- Bakhsh: Central
- Rural District: Miyan Darband

Population (2006)
  - Total: 2,242
- Time zone: UTC+3:30 (IRST)
  - Summer (DST): UTC+4:30 (IRDT)

Gav Bandeh (Persian: گاوبنده, also Romanized as Gāv Bandeh; also known as Gāvāneh, Gāvbandel, and Gāwāna) is a village in Miyan Darband Rural District, in the Central District of Kermanshah County, Kermanshah Province, Iran. At the 2006 census, its population was 2,242, in 547 families.
