= Dareveyan =

Dareveyan درويان
- Village
- Location within Iran
- Coordinates: 35°50′02″N 46°53′11″E
- Country: Iran
- Province: Kurdistan
- County: Divandarreh
- Bakhsh: Saral
- Rural District: Saral

Population (2006)
  - Total: 69
- Time zone: UTC+3:30 (IRST)
  - Summer (DST): UTC+4:30 (IRDT)

Dareveyan (Persian: درويان, also Romanized as Dareveyān; also known as Dalvīān, Darreh Vīān, and Darreh-ye Īvān) is a village in Saral Rural District, Saral District, Divandarreh County, Kurdistan Province, Iran. At the 2006 census, its population was 69, in 12 families. The village is populated by Kurds.
