= Kamyaran =

City in Kurdistan province, Iran

Kamyaran Persian: کامیاران Kurdish: کامێران
- City
- Location within Iran Location within Iran Kurdistan
- Coordinates: 34°47′43″N 46°56′12″E
- Country: Iran
- Province: Kurdistan
- County: Kamyaran
- District: Central

Population (2016)
  - Total: 57,077
- Time zone: UTC+3:30 (IRST)

Kamyaran (Persian: كامياران) (Note: Also romanized as Kāmyārān; Kurdish: کامێران, romanized as Kamêran) is a city in the Central District of Kamyaran County, Kurdistan province, Iran, serving as capital of both the county and the district.

Kamyaran is located in the southernmost part of Kurdistan Province, 420 kilometers southwest of Tehran and 58. kilometers south of Sanandaj, along the road connecting Sanandaj and Kermanshah.

The culture of this city is similar to that of other areas in Kurdistan province and its inhabitants speak Central Kurdish The main dialects spoken by the residents of Kamyaran are Ardalani and Hawrami Kurdish, while some inhabitants of this city speak Kulyai and Kermanshahi Kurdish.

Some of the major tribes of Kamyaran, considered among its oldest inhabitants, follow the Jewish religion. Persian language is used as the language of writing and education in the city.

== Demographics ==
=== Ethnicity and religion ===
The inhabitants of Kamyaran are Kurdish and mainly follow the Shafi'i school of Sunni Islam; however there is a Shia minority as well as a few Jewish families in Kamyaran.

The majority of the population in this city follows Sunni Islam of the Shafi'i school of thought. Another segment of the Kurdish population, mainly those who speak Kermanshahi and Kulyai Kurdish, follows Shia Islam or the Yarsan.

Kamyaran linguistic composition
| Language | percent |
| Central Kurdish | 63% |
| Southern Kurdish | 20% |
| Hawrami | 15% |
| New Persian | 2% |

=== Population ===
The population of Kamyaran tripled in a matter of two decades (1975-1995) due to mass immigration from nearby villages. At the time of the 2006 National Census, the city's population was 46,760 in 11,186 households. The following census in 2011 counted 52,907 people in 14,007 households. The 2016 census measured the population of the city as 57,077 people in 16,547 households.

== Geography ==
The city of Kamyaran is located at the south end of Kurdistan province between two major Kurdish cities, Sanandaj and Kermanshah. It lies at 46°55′ east longitude and 34°48′ north latitude, measured from the Greenwich meridian, at an average elevation of 1,340 meters above sea level.

Kermanshah is the nearest major city to Kamyaran. The distance between Kamyaran and Sanandaj, the provincial capital, is approximately 64 kilometers.

== Climate ==
Kamyaran enjoys a pleasant climate in spring and autumn. Winters are relatively mild, while summers are moderate and not excessively hot.

== Archaeology ==
Tengiwer cuneiform inscription is located 45 km northwest of Kamyaran. The inscription consists of 47 lines in cuneiform that had been carved in Assyrian. The inscription refers to Sargon II, an Assyrian king, on which his captures of Arpad, Simirra, Damacsus, Egypt and other countries have been inscribed. The inscription dates back to around the eighth century B.C.E.

== Tourism ==
Kamyaran County has 130 historical monuments, 74 of which are officially registered as national heritage sites.
