= Varesh Nowshahr W.F.C. =

Varesh Nowshahr
- Full name: Varesh Nowshahr Women's Football Club
- Ground: Shohada-ye Nowshahr Stadium
- Capacity: 5,000
- Owner: Hadi Kashefi
- President: Hadi Kashefi
- Head coach: Mehrnoosh Razmi
- League: Kowsar Women Football League
- 2025–26: Winners

The Varesh Nowshahr Women's Football Club (W.F.C.) (Persian: باشگاه فوتبال زنان وارش نوشهر) is an Iranian women's football club based in Nowshahr, Mazandaran province, Iran, competing in the Kowsar Women Football League. The club won the 2025–26 1st Division League and earned promotion to the top tier.

== History ==
=== 1st Division title and promotion (2025–26) ===
Varesh Nowshahr competed in the Iran Women's 1st Division League under the management of Mehrnoosh Razmi. The team progressed through the group stage and reached the play-off stage, eventually qualifying for the final.

The final of the 1st Division League was held at Shohadaye Nowshahr Stadium, where Varesh Nowshahr faced Esteghlal Tehran. The two teams drew 1–1 after regulation time and extra time, with the championship decided by a penalty shoot-out.

Varesh Nowshahr won the penalty shoot-out 3–0 to claim the championship. Varesh player Zeinab Esmaeili finished as the league's top scorer with 10 goals.

Prior to the final, both Varesh Nowshahr and Esteghlal Tehran had already secured promotion to the top division for the following season.

== Performance in the Kowsar League ==
=== 2026–27 season ===
As 1st Division champions, Varesh Nowshahr earned promotion to the Kowsar Women Football League alongside Esteghlal Tehran, replacing Fara Isatis Karan Fars and Yasam Kurdistan.

In the new top-division season, the club is grouped with Khatoon Bam, Gol Gohar Sirjan, Eesta Alborz, Malavan Bandar Anzali, Sepahan Isfahan, Palayesh Gaz Ilam, Persepolis Tehran, and Ava Tehran.

== Technical staff ==
- Head coach: Mehrnoosh Razmi

== Stadium ==
Varesh Nowshahr plays its home matches at Shohada-ye Nowshahr Stadium.

== Honours ==
Competition	Winners	Runners-up	Seasons
Iran Women's Football 1st Division League	1	–	Winners: 2025–26

== Individual honours ==
- Iran Women's 1st Division League top scorer: Zeinab Esmaeili (2025–26 season – 10 goals)
