= Belan, Powys =

Hamlet, 3.5 mi southwest of Welshpool, in Powys, Wales

Coordinates: 52.628249°N 3.179415°W

Belan
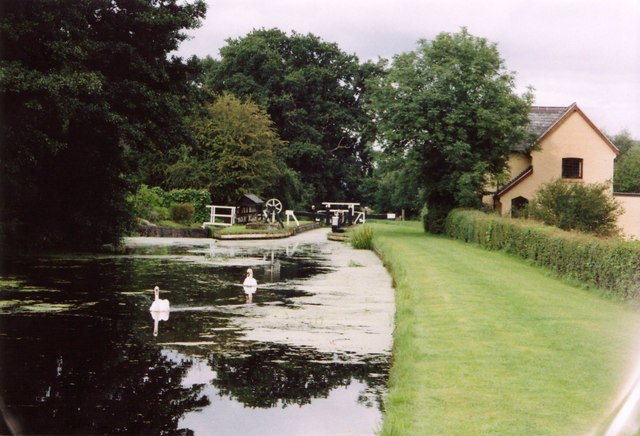

- Location within Powys
- OS grid reference: SJ 2027 0404
  - Cardiff: 79 mi (127 km)
  - London: 151 mi (243 km)
- Community: Welshpool
- Principal area: Powys
- Country: Wales
- Sovereign state: United Kingdom
- Post town: WELSHPOOL
- Postcode district: SY21
- Police: Dyfed-Powys
- Fire: Mid and West Wales
- Ambulance: Welsh
- UK Parliament: Montgomeryshire and Glyndŵr
- Senedd Cymru – Welsh Parliament: Montgomeryshire

Belan is a hamlet, 3.5 miles (5.6 km) southwest of Welshpool, in Powys, Wales. It belongs to the community of Welshpool. The Belan Locks, built around 1800 as part of the Montgomery Canal, are nearby.

== See also ==
- List of localities in Wales by population
