= Tubreh Riz, Kermanshah =

Tubreh Riz توبره ريز
- Village
- Location within Iran
- Coordinates: 34°18′15″N 47°11′54″E
- Country: Iran
- Province: Kermanshah
- County: Kermanshah
- Bakhsh: Central
- Rural District: Dorudfaraman

Population (2006)
  - Total: 421
- Time zone: UTC+3:30 (IRST)
  - Summer (DST): UTC+4:30 (IRDT)

Tubreh Riz (Persian: توبره ريز, also Romanized as Tūbreh Rīz) is a village in Dorudfaraman Rural District, in the Central District of Kermanshah County, Kermanshah Province, Iran. At the 2006 census, its population was 421, in 84 families.
