= Fara Isatis Karan W.F.C. =

Fara Isatis Karan
- Full name: Fara Isatis Karan Shiraz Women's Football Club
- Founded: 13 November 2017; 8 years ago
- Ground: Shahid Dastgheib Stadium
- Capacity: 5,000
- Owner: Parvaneh Karan Khosravi
- Chairman: Parvaneh Karan Khosravi
- Manager: Parvaneh Karan Khosravi
- League: 1st Division League
- 2025–26: 9th (relegated)

Fara Isatis Karan Women's Football Club (Persian: باشگاه فوتبال زنان فرا ایساتیس کران) is a women's football club based in Shiraz, Iran, founded in 2017. The club currently competes in the Iran Women's Football 1st Division League.

The club was founded by Parvaneh Karan Khosravi, who simultaneously serves as the owner, CEO, and head coach of the team.

== History ==
Fara Isatis Karan was established in 2017 in Shiraz with a long-term plan, starting its work from the youth ranks. The club's youth team won the Fars province youth championship in 2018.

=== 2021–22 season ===
The club began its professional activities at the senior level in 2020. In 2021, the club's senior team competed in the Iran Women's Football 1st Division League and won the championship with 18 points from 7 matches (6 wins, 0 draws, 1 loss), earning promotion to the 2022–23 Kowsar Women Football League.

=== 2022–23 season ===
In this season, Fara Isatis Karan, competing in the top tier of Iranian women's football for the first time, did not perform well but managed to finish eighth with 14 points from 18 matches (4 wins, 2 draws, 12 losses), remaining in the Kowsar Women Football League for another season.

=== 2023–24 season ===
This was the club's second season in the Kowsar Women Football League, which ended unsuccessfully. The team finished tenth and last with 8 points from 18 matches (2 wins, 2 draws, 14 losses), suffering relegation to the 2024–25 Iran Women's Football 1st Division League.

=== 2024–25 season ===
In the 2024–25 season, the team reached the final of the 2024–25 Iran Women's Football 1st Division League alongside Persepolis. In the final, they lost 3–1 to Persepolis, but as runners-up, they secured promotion back to the top division.

=== 2025–26 season ===
In their third season in the top division, the team competed with a young squad with an average age of under 20 against strong teams such as Khatoon Bam, Gol Gohar, and Eesta Alborz. At the end of the season, they finished ninth with 7 points from 18 matches (2 wins, 1 draw, 15 losses) and were relegated.

== Honours ==
Competition	Winners	Runners-up	Seasons
Iran Women's Football 1st Division League	1	1	Winners: 2021; Runners-up: 2024–25
