= Alexey Belan =

Latvian and Russian hacker

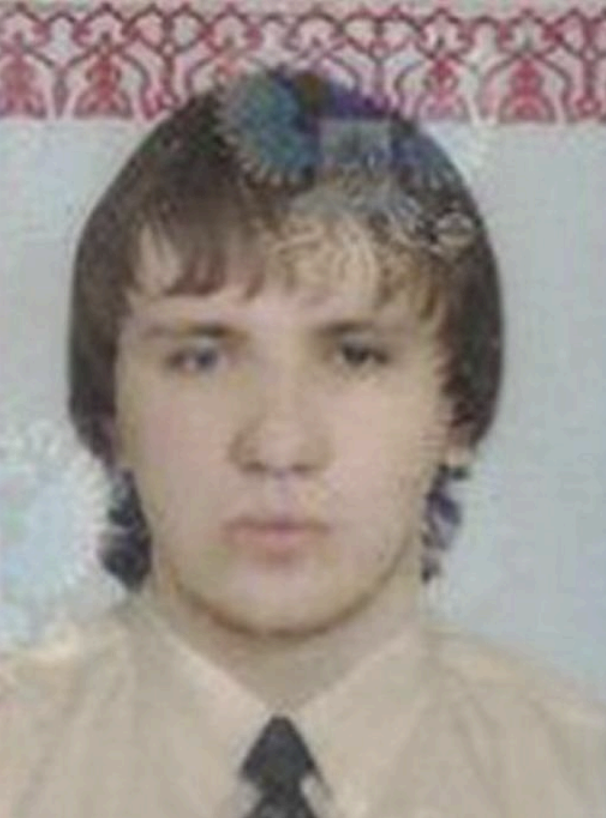
- Born: Alexey Alexeevich Belan; June 27, 1987 (age 38); Riga, Latvia
- Other name: Abyr Valgov
- Occupation: Security hacker

Alexey Alexeevich Belan (Russian: Алексей Алексеевич Белан; Latvian: Aleksejs Belans; born June 27, 1987) is a Latvian and Russian security hacker on the FBI's list of most wanted criminals. He has been accused of illegal access to the computer networks of three US companies in the states of Nevada and California. As a result of breaches committed in 2012 and 2013, a hacker stole personal data of company employees and several million registered users of their services, which was later sold through the Internet. He is known under the aliases Abyr Valgov, Abyrvalg, Fedyunya, Magg, М4G, and Moy.Yavik and is referred to as Alexsey Belan by FBI.
