= Hashli, Sanandaj =

Hashli هشلي
- Village
- Location within Iran
- Coordinates: 35°10′00″N 46°50′00″E
- Country: Iran
- Province: Kurdistan
- County: Sanandaj
- Bakhsh: Central
- Rural District: Zhavarud-e Sharqi

Population (2006)
  - Total: 18
- Time zone: UTC+3:30 (IRST)
  - Summer (DST): UTC+4:30 (IRDT)

Hashli (Persian: هشلي, also Romanized as Hashlī) is a village in Zhavarud-e Sharqi Rural District, in the Central District of Sanandaj County, Kurdistan Province, Iran. At the 2006 census, its population was 18, in 4 families. The village is populated by Kurds.
