= Lown (surname) =

Lown is a surname. Notable people with the surname include:

- Bernard Lown (1921–2021), American developer of the direct current defibrillator and the cardioverter, founder of the Lown Institute
- Bert Lown (1903–1962), American violinist, orchestra leader, and songwriter
- George H. Lown, American politician
- Misty Lown, American dance teacher
- Peter Lown (born 1947), Canadian field hockey player
- Thomas Lown (1904–1977), American boxer
- Turk Lown (1924–2016), American baseball player
