= Tubreh Riz, Dehgolan =

Tubreh Riz توبره ريز
- Village
- Location within Iran
- Coordinates: 35°13′44″N 47°28′39″E
- Country: Iran
- Province: Kurdistan
- County: Dehgolan
- Bakhsh: Central
- Rural District: Howmeh-ye Dehgolan

Population (2006)
  - Total: 336
- Time zone: UTC+3:30 (IRST)
  - Summer (DST): UTC+4:30 (IRDT)

Tubreh Riz (Persian: توبره ريز, also Romanized as Tūbreh Rīz; also known as Tarburīz, Tōrbeh Rīz, Torbrīz, and Tūrbeh Rīz) is a village in Howmeh-ye Dehgolan Rural District, in the Central District of Dehgolan County, Kurdistan Province, Iran. At the 2006 census, its population was 336, in 73 families. The village is populated by Kurds.
