= SS Alk =

German cargo ship

History
- Name: Alk (1924–1945); Empire Contest (1945–1946); Vereshyagin (1946–1960)
- Owner: Roland Linie AG (1924–1926); Norddeutscher Lloyd (1926–1933); Argo Reederei AG (1933–1937); Argo Reederei Richard Adler & Co (1937–1945); Ministry of War Transport (1945); Ministry of Transport (1945–1946); Soviet Government (1946–1960)
- Operator: Roland Linie AG (1924–1926); Norddeutscher Lloyd (1926–1933); Argo Reederei AG (1933–1937); Argo Reederei Richard Adler & Co (1937–1945); W A Wilson Ltd (1945–1946); Soviet Government (1946–1960)
- Port of registry: (Weimar Republic) Bremen (1924–1933); (Nazi Germany) Bremen (1938–1945); (United Kingdom) London (1945–1946); (Soviet Union) Arkhangelsk (1946–1960)
- Builder: Neptun AG
- Launched: 1924
- Identification: Code Letters QLWM (1924–1934); Code Letters DOMF (1934–1945); Code Letters GQXW (1945–1946); United Kingdom Official Number 180727 (1945–1946)
- Fate: Scrapped

General characteristics
- Type: Cargo ship
- Tonnage: 1,175 GRT; 612 NRT
- Length: 221 ft 4 in (67.46 m)
- Beam: 34 ft 9 in (10.59 m)
- Depth: 11 ft 2 in (3.40 m)
- Installed power: Triple expansion steam engine
- Propulsion: Screw propeller

Alk was a 1,175 GRT cargo ship that was built in 1924 by Neptun AG, Rostock, Germany for German owners. She was seized by the Allies in May 1945, passed to the Ministry of War Transport (MoWT) and was renamed Empire Contest. In 1946, she was allocated to the Soviet Union and renamed Vereshyagin (Верещагин). She served until about 1960, being deleted from Lloyd's Register in that year.

== Description ==
The ship was built in 1924 by Neptun AG.

The ship was 221 feet 4 inches (67.46 m) long, with a beam of 34 feet 9 inches (10.59 m) and a depth of 11 feet 2 inches (3.40 m). The ship had a GRT of 1,175 and a NRT of 612.

The ship was propelled by a triple expansion steam engine, which had cylinders of 17 9/16 inches (44.6 cm), 29 9/16 inches (75.1 cm) and 47 1/8 inches (120 cm) diameter by 31 1/2 inches (80 cm) stroke. The engine was built by Neptun.

== History ==
Alk was built for Roland Linie AG, Bremen. Her port of registry was Bremen and she was allocated the Code Letters QLWM. By 1926, Norddeutscher Lloyd had taken over Roland Linie. In 1933, Alk was transferred to Argo Reederei AG, Bremen. In 1934, her Code Letters were changed to DOMF. In 1936, the company changed its name to Argo Reederei Richard Adler & Co.

In May 1945, Alk was seized by the Allies at Brunsbüttel. She was passed to the MoWT and renamed Empire Contest. Her port of registry was changed to London. The Code Letters GQXW and United Kingdom Official Number 180747 were allocated. She was placed under the management of W A Wilson Ltd.

In 1946, Empire Contesnt was transferred to the Soviet Government and was renamed Vereshyagin. Her port of registry was changed to Arkhangelsk. She served until c1960, when she was deleted from shipping registers.
