= Loon (disambiguation) =

A loon is an aquatic bird in the genus Gavia, also called a diver.

Loon may also refer to:

== Places ==
=== Europe ===
- County of Loon, a former county in present-day Belgium, named after:
  - Borgloon, a city and municipality in Belgium
- Loon, Drenthe, a village in the northeastern Netherlands
- Loon op Zand, Netherlands

=== Other places ===
- Loon, Iran (disambiguation), several places in Iran
- Loon, Bohol, a municipality in the Philippines
- Loon Mountain, a mountain in Lincoln, New Hampshire, United States
  - Loon Mountain Ski Resort, a ski resort at Loon Mountain

== Sports teams ==
- Great Lakes Loons, a minor league baseball team in Midland, Michigan, US
- Forfar Athletic F.C., nicknamed The Loons, a Scottish football team
- Minnesota United FC, nicknamed The Loons, an American soccer team

== Other ==
- Republic-Ford JB-2 or KGW-1 Loon, reverse engineered copy of German V-1 cruise missile, or "buzz bomb" for the US Navy.
- Lunatic, slang loon, or loony, people who are considered mentally ill
- Loon pants, a type of trouser with flared legs
- Loon (rapper) (born 1975), American rapper
- Loon (company), a company by Alphabet testing the use of high-altitude balloons to provide Internet access to rural areas
- Loon (monkey), a monkey who was taught to participate in the treatment of his diabetes.
- Loons: The Fight for Fame, a video game featuring classic Looney Tunes characters
- The Loon, a 2005 album by the band Tapes N Tapes
- Lulubelle Loon, a Disney character
- Loon (album)
- Loon (alias), alias of Yap Weng Wah, a Malaysian serial sex offender
- Loon, an expanded paved apron that is a part of a Michigan left

== See also ==
- Loonie, common name for the Canadian 1 dollar coin
- Loon-Plage, a town in France
- Loon op Zand, a municipality and village in the southern Netherlands
