= Shahini, Kermanshah =

Shahini شاهيني
- Village
- Location within Iran
- Coordinates: 34°25′02″N 46°56′44″E
- Country: Iran
- Province: Kermanshah
- County: Kermanshah
- Bakhsh: Central
- Rural District: Baladarband

Population (2006)
  - Total: 344
- Time zone: UTC+3:30 (IRST)
  - Summer (DST): UTC+4:30 (IRDT)

Shahini (Persian: شاهيني, also Romanized as Shāhīnī) is a village in Baladarband Rural District, in the Central District of Kermanshah County, Kermanshah Province, Iran. At the 2006 census, its population was 344, in 73 families.
