= Khanomabad, Javanrud =

Khanomabad خانم اباد
- Village
- Location within Iran
- Coordinates: 34°44′21″N 46°28′09″E
- Country: Iran
- Province: Kermanshah
- County: Javanrud
- Bakhsh: Central
- Rural District: Palanganeh

Population (2006)
  - Total: 269
- Time zone: UTC+3:30 (IRST)
  - Summer (DST): UTC+4:30 (IRDT)

Khanomabad (Persian: خانم اباد, also Romanized as Khānomābād; also known as Pīr Bābā) is a village in Palanganeh Rural District, in the Central District of Javanrud County, Kermanshah Province, Iran. At the 2006 census, its population was 269, in 54 families.
