= Khanomabad, Ravansar =

Khanomabad خانم اباد
- Village
- Location within Iran
- Coordinates: 34°46′15″N 46°32′40″E
- Country: Iran
- Province: Kermanshah
- County: Ravansar
- Bakhsh: Central
- Rural District: Badr

Population (2006)
  - Total: 92
- Time zone: UTC+3:30 (IRST)
  - Summer (DST): UTC+4:30 (IRDT)

Khanomabad (Persian: خانم اباد, also Romanized as Khānomābād) is a village in Badr Rural District, in the Central District of Ravansar County, Kermanshah Province, Iran. At the 2006 census, its population was 92, in 21 families.
