= Marghoobkar Stadium =

Sports venue in Tehran, Iran

Coordinates: 35°38′26″N 51°24′26″E

Shahid Marghoobkar Stadium
- Interactive map of Shahid Marghoobkar Stadium
- Full name: Shahid Marghoobkar Stadium
- Location: Tehran, Iran
- Owner: Esteghlal
- Capacity: 12,000
- Surface: Grass

Tenants
- Esteghlal Women; Tehran Yasa

Shahid Marghoobkar Stadium is a stadium located in the Rajaei Street area of Tehran, Iran.

The land for the stadium was allocated before the Iranian Revolution. The current owner is Esteghlal, having been transferred to the club on 4 August 2020 during the tenure of manager Ahmad Saadatmand.

The stadium has a capacity of 12,000 spectators and features a natural grass pitch in its center.

== Function and notable events ==
· Home ground for Esteghlal Women's Football Team · Home ground for Persepolis Women's Football Team (one season) · Occasionally, the senior team of Esteghlal holds one of their training sessions at Marghubkar Stadium. · Home ground for Tehran Yasa Football Team

== In the media ==
Coverage of a friendly match between the boys' and girls' youth teams of Esteghlal at the stadium attracted media attention from national outlets and major Iranian newspapers. This ultimately led to the dissolution of both the boys' and girls' youth teams of the club.
