= ALK Airlines =

Bulgarian charter airline

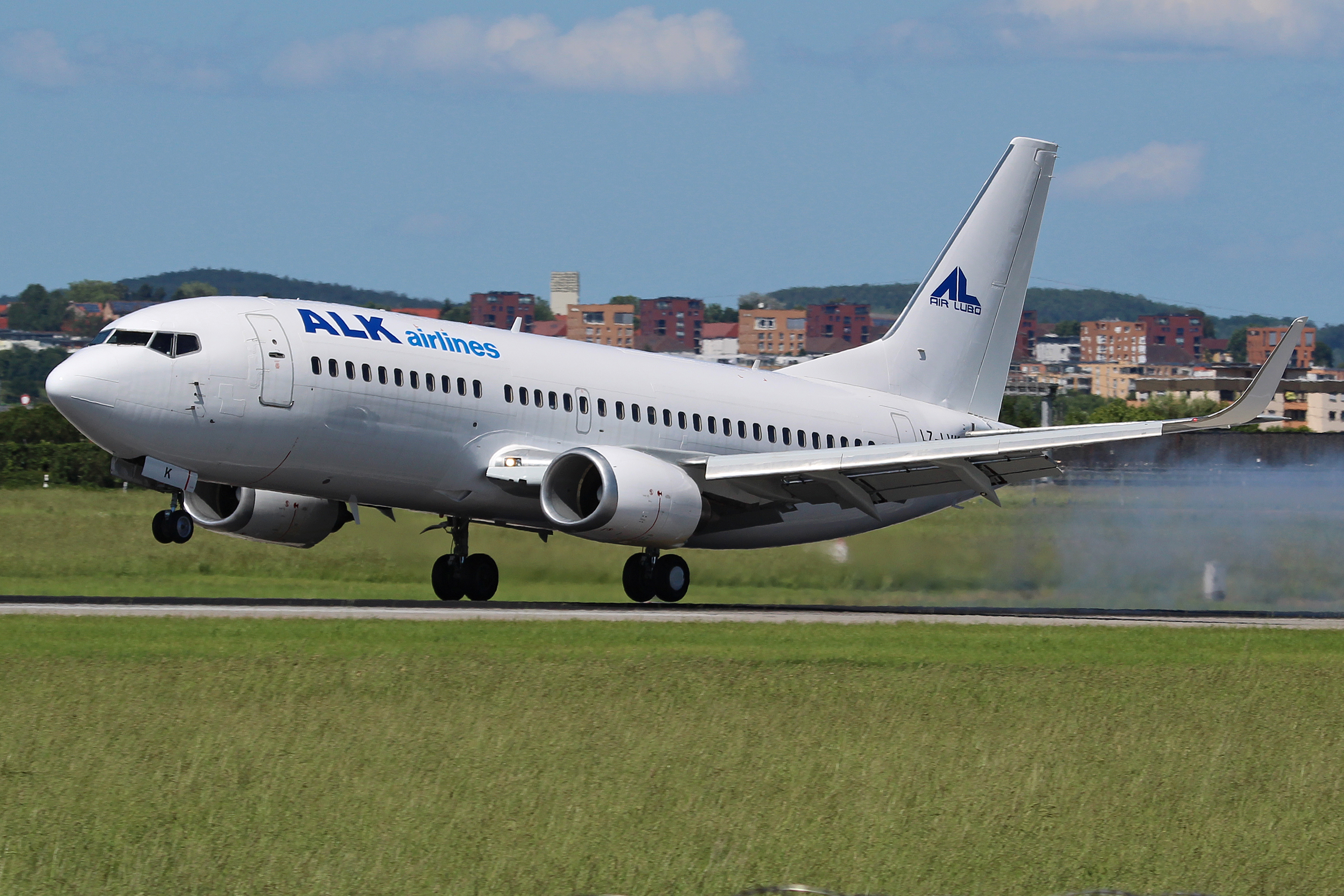
- Boeing-737-300
IATA	ICAO	Call sign
—	VBB	AIR LUBO
- Founded: 2016; 10 years ago
- Operating bases: Sofia Airport
- Fleet size: 2
- Headquarters: Sofia, Bulgaria
- Website: airvk-bg.net

ALK Airlines, legally registered as Air Lubo (ALK JSC), is a Bulgarian passenger charter airline headquartered in Sofia.

== History ==
The airline was established in May 2016 and commenced operations after a short time. Originally it planned to buy Fokker 100s from defunct Dutch Antilles Express. However, only one of them was subsequently operated while the other was sold for spare parts to Iran Aseman Airlines.

== Destinations ==
The airline offers worldwide charter flights with a focus on services to and from Bulgaria.

== Fleet ==
=== Current fleet ===
As of August 2025, ALK Airlines operates the following aircraft:

- 2 Boeing-737-300

=== Historic fleet ===
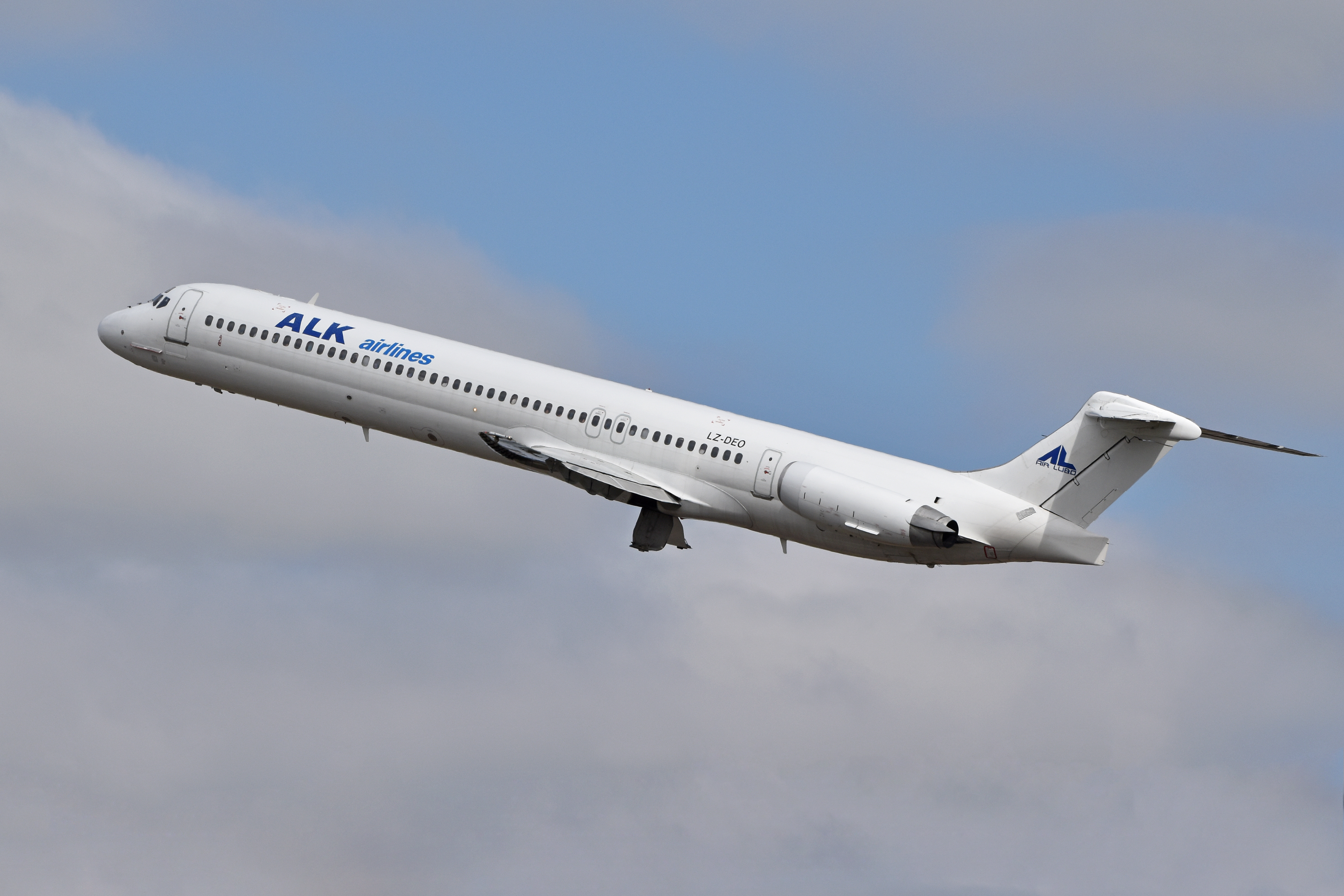
McDonnell Douglas MD-82

The airline formerly also operated the following aircraft types:

- 4 Fokker 100
- 2 McDonnell Douglas MD-82
- 1 McDonnell Douglas MD-83

== Incidents and accidents ==
- On 17 June 2019, an ALK Airlines Boeing 737-300 performing flight VBB-7205 from Pristina, Kosovo to Basel, Switzerland hit severe turbulence at approximately 32,000 feet which threw passengers, service items and flight attendants into the ceiling of the jet causing injuries. The experience has been reported to have been similar to that of Zero G. 10 passengers were taken to the hospital after landing.
