= Darvian-e Olya =

Darvian-e Olya درويان عليا
- Village
- Location within Iran
- Coordinates: 35°56′06″N 46°27′37″E
- Country: Iran
- Province: Kurdistan
- County: Saqqez
- Bakhsh: Ziviyeh
- Rural District: Khvor Khvoreh

Population (2006)
  - Total: 446
- Time zone: UTC+3:30 (IRST)
  - Summer (DST): UTC+4:30 (IRDT)

Darvian-e Olya (Persian: درويان عليا, also Romanized as Darvīān-e ‘Olyā and Darvīān ‘Olyā; also known as Darreh Veyān-e ‘Olyā, Darreh Veyān-e Sheykh, Darreh Vīān-e ‘Olyā, Darreh Vīān-e Sheykh Aḩmad, Darreh Vīān Sheykh-e Bālā, Darreh Wiyān, Darvīān-e Sheykh Aḩmad, and Qareh Vīān) is a village in Khvor Khvoreh Rural District, Ziviyeh District, Saqqez County, Kurdistan Province, Iran. At the 2006 census, its population was 446, in 81 families. The village is populated by Kurds.
