= Darvian-e Sofla =

Darvian-e Sofla درويان سفلي
- Village
- Location within Iran
- Coordinates: 35°56′58″N 46°32′26″E
- Country: Iran
- Province: Kurdistan
- County: Saqqez
- Bakhsh: Ziviyeh
- Rural District: Khvor Khvoreh

Population (2006)
  - Total: 181
- Time zone: UTC+3:30 (IRST)
  - Summer (DST): UTC+4:30 (IRDT)

Darvian-e Sofla (Persian: درويان سفلي, also Romanized as Darvīān-e Soflá; also known as Darreh Vīān-e Khoshkeh, Darreh Vīān-e Khowshkeh, Darreh Vīān Khoshkeh, Darreh Wiyan Khushkeh, and Takāvasān) is a village in Khvor Khvoreh Rural District, Ziviyeh District, Saqqez County, Kurdistan Province, Iran. At the 2006 census, its population was 181, in 30 families. The village is populated by Kurds.
