= Iran Women's Football 1st Division League =

- Founded: 2005 (21 years ago)
- Country: Iran
- Confederation: AFC
- Number of clubs: 12
- Level on pyramid: 2
- Promotion to: Kowsar League
- Relegation to: 2nd Division League
- Domestic cup: Hazfi Cup
- Current champions: Persepolis (2024–25)
- Broadcaster(s): Not televised; only news and reports
- Website: Official competition website
- Current: 2025–26

The Iran Women's Football 1st Division League is the second-highest level of women's football in Iran. The league is organized by the Football Federation Islamic Republic of Iran.

Teams in the league compete in two groups of six, playing each other on a home-and-away basis. The top two teams from the league are promoted to the Iran Women's Premier League.

== History ==
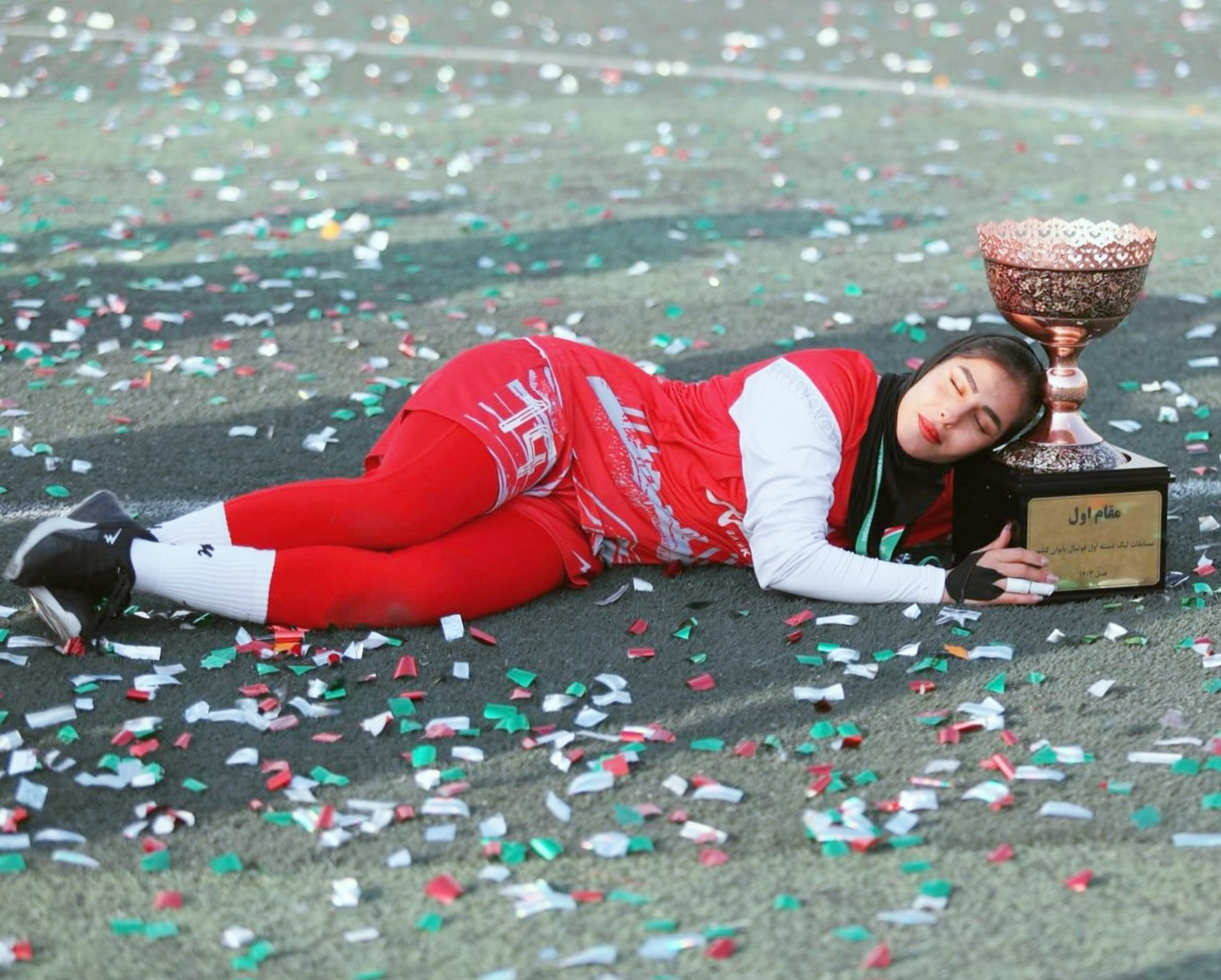
A scene from the championship celebration by a Persepolis player with the trophy for the 2024 season

In 2024, with the entry of women's teams from Esteghlal and Persepolis into the league, media outlets such as Iran International, BBC Persian, Voice of America, Tasnim, Mehrnews, and others covered the league. In general, the women's teams of Esteghlal and Persepolis drew media attention to the league. Sports websites also published exclusive reports on the league.

== Format and regulations ==
Teams in this league compete in two groups of six, playing home-and-away matches. Until 2024, matches on artificial turf were also permitted for teams.

== List of seasons and champions ==
- 2022–23 season: Tika
- 2023–24 season: Tam Isfahan
- 2024–25 season: Persepolis
- 2025–26 season: Varesh Nowshahr

== Sponsors, kit suppliers and television coverage ==
The league is organized under the supervision of the Football Federation Islamic Republic of Iran. The sponsors of this league may differ from those of the Iranian Women's Premier League.

Currently, the league has no television broadcast.

== See also ==
- Kowsar Football League
- Iran Women's Football 2nd Division League
