= Shahu Rural District =

Rural district in Kurdistan province, Iran

Shahu Rural District Persian: دهستان شاهو
- Rural District
- Location within Iran Location within Iran Kurdistan
- Coordinates: 34°49′16″N 46°50′14″E
- Country: Iran
- Province: Kurdistan
- County: Kamyaran
- District: Central
- Capital: Varmahang

Population (2016)
  - Total: 5,959
- Time zone: UTC+3:30 (IRST)

Shahu Rural District (Persian: دهستان شاهو) is in the Central District of Kamyaran County, Kurdistan province, Iran. Its capital is the village of Varmahang.

== Demographics ==
=== Population ===
At the time of the 2006 National Census, the rural district's population was 8,935 in 2,082 households. There were 6,054 inhabitants in 1,582 households at the following census of 2011. The 2016 census measured the population of the rural district as 5,959 in 1,696 households. The most populous of its 18 villages was Alk, with 1,303 people.
