= Bilavar Rural District =

Rural district in Kurdistan province, Iran

Bilavar Rural District Persian: دهستان بيلوار
- Rural District
- Location within Iran Location within Iran Kurdistan
- Coordinates: 34°49′28″N 47°01′21″E
- Country: Iran
- Province: Kurdistan
- County: Kamyaran
- District: Central
- Capital: Shirvaneh

Population (2016)
  - Total: 6,903
- Time zone: UTC+3:30 (IRST)

Bilavar Rural District (Persian: دهستان بيلوار) is in the Central District of Kamyaran County, Kurdistan province, Iran. Its capital is the village of Shirvaneh.

== Demographics ==
=== Population ===
At the time of the 2006 National Census, the rural district's population was 5,484 in 1,260 households. There were 6,360 inhabitants in 1,708 households at the following census of 2011. The 2016 census measured the population of the rural district as 6,903 in 2,010 households. The most populous of its 28 villages was Shirvaneh, with 2,092 people.
