= Zhavehrud Rural District =

Rural district in Kurdistan province, Iran

Zhavehrud Rural District Persian: دهستان ژاورود
- Rural District
- Location within Iran Location within Iran Kurdistan
- Coordinates: 34°57′20″N 46°42′27″E
- Country: Iran
- Province: Kurdistan
- County: Kamyaran
- District: Central
- Capital: Gashki

Population (2016)
  - Total: 11,002
- Time zone: UTC+3:30 (IRST)

Zhavehrud Rural District (Persian: دهستان ژاورود) is in the Central District of Kamyaran County, Kurdistan province, Iran. Its capital is the village of Gashki.

== Demographics ==
=== Population ===
At the time of the 2006 National Census, the rural district's population was 12,641 in 3,041 households. There were 12,073 inhabitants in 3,288 households at the following census of 2011. The 2016 census measured the population of the rural district as 11,002 in 3,307 households. The most populous of its 33 villages was Shahini, with 1,663 people.
