= Central District (Kamyaran County) =

District in Kurdistan province, Iran

Central District (Kamyaran County) Persian: بخش مرکزی شهرستان کامیاران
- District
- Location within Iran Location within Iran Kurdistan
- Coordinates: 34°55′12″N 46°50′00″E
- Country: Iran
- Province: Kurdistan
- County: Kamyaran
- Capital: Kamyaran

Population (2016)
  - Total: 80,941
- Time zone: UTC+3:30 (IRST)

The Central District of Kamyaran County (Persian: بخش مرکزی شهرستان کامیاران) is in Kurdistan province, Iran. Its capital is the city of Kamyaran.

== Demographics ==
=== Population ===
At the time of the 2006 National Census, the district's population was 73,820 in 17,569 households. The following census in 2011 counted 77,394 people in 20,585 households. The 2016 census measured the population of the district as 80,941 inhabitants in 23,560 households.

=== Administrative divisions ===
Central District (Kamyaran County) Population
Administrative Divisions	2006	2011	2016
Bilavar RD	5,484	6,360	6,903
Shahu RD	8,935	6,054	5,959
Zhavehrud RD	12,641	12,073	11,002
Kamyaran (city)	46,760	52,907	57,077
Total	73,820	77,394	80,941
RD = Rural District
