= Kamyaran County =

County in Kurdistan province, Iran

Kamyaran County Persian: شهرستان کامیاران
- County
- Location of Kamyaran County in Kurdistan province

- Location of Kurdistan province in Iran
- Coordinates: 34°57′N 46°55′E
- Country: Iran
- Province: Kurdistan
- Capital: Kamyaran
- Districts: Central, Muchesh

Population (2016)
  - Total: 102,856
- Time zone: UTC+3:30 (IRST)

Kamyaran County (Persian: شهرستان کامیاران) (Note: Kurdish: کامیاران) is in Kurdistan province, Iran. Its capital is the city of Kamyaran.

== Demographics ==
=== Population ===
At the time of the 2006 National Census, the county's population was 104,704 in 25,012 households. The following census in 2011 counted 105,996 people in 28,508 households. The 2016 census measured the population of the county as 102,856 in 30,276 households.

=== Administrative divisions ===
Kamyaran County's population history and administrative structure over three consecutive censuses are shown in the following table.

Kamyaran County Population
Administrative Divisions	2006	2011	2016
Central District	73,820	77,394	80,941
Bilavar RD	5,484	6,360	6,903
Shahu RD	8,935	6,054	5,959
Zhavehrud RD	12,641	12,073	11,002
Kamyaran (city)	46,760	52,907	57,077
Muchesh District	30,884	28,602	21,915
Amirabad RD	7,330	6,518	5,517
Avalan RD	3,626	3,224	2,401
Gavrud RD	11,304	10,754	6,459
Sursur RD	5,674	4,658	4,168
Muchesh (city)	2,950	3,448	3,370
Total	104,704	105,996	102,856
RD = Rural District

== See also ==
Media related to Kamyaran County at Wikimedia Commons
