= 2023–24 Kayserispor season =

Kayserispor
2023–24 season
- Stadium: Kadir Has Stadium
- Süper Lig: 4th
- Turkish Cup: Fourth round
- Average home league attendance: 6,812

The 2023–24 season is Kayserispor's 58th season in existence and ninth consecutive in the Süper Lig. They are also competing in the Turkish Cup.

== Players ==
=== First-team squad ===
As of 26 September 2023

Note: Flags indicate national team as defined under FIFA eligibility rules; some limited exceptions apply. Players may hold more than one non-FIFA nationality.

No.	Pos.	Nation	Player
1	GK	TUR	Onurcan Piri
3	DF	GHA	Joseph Larweh Attamah
4	DF	GRE	Dimitrios Kolovetsios (captain)
5	DF	IRI	Majid Hosseini
6	MF	IRI	Ali Karimi
7	FW	POR	Miguel Cardoso
8	MF	TUR	Kartal Yılmaz (on loan from Beşiktaş)
9	FW	SEN	Mame Thiam (2nd captain)
10	MF	CMR	Olivier Kemen
11	FW	TUR	Gökhan Sazdağı (3rd captain)
12	GK	TUR	Abdulkadir Taşdan
13	FW	CMR	Stéphane Bahoken
14	DF	TUR	Muhammed Eren Arıkan
16	MF	TUR	Mehmet Eray Özbek
17	DF	NGR	Anthony Uzodimma
19	DF	TUR	Ahmet Kağan Malatyalı

No.	Pos.	Nation	Player
20	FW	GBS	Carlos Mané
21	MF	TUR	Yiğit Emre Çeltik
22	FW	TUR	Hayrullah Erkip
23	DF	FRA	Lionel Carole
25	GK	NED	Bilal Bayazit
26	MF	TUR	Baran Ali Gezek
28	MF	TUR	Ramazan Civelek
33	DF	TUR	Hasan Ali Kaldırım
39	GK	TUR	Mehmet Şamil Öztürk
42	DF	NOR	Mirkan Cevdet Buğurcu
54	DF	TUR	Arif Kocaman
70	FW	POR	Aylton Boa Morte
89	MF	GHA	Yaw Ackah
92	DF	GUI	Julian Jeanvier
99	FW	TUR	Talha Sarıarslan
—	DF	TUR	Bilal Ceylan

=== Other players under contract ===
Note: Flags indicate national team as defined under FIFA eligibility rules; some limited exceptions apply. Players may hold more than one non-FIFA nationality.

No.	Pos.	Nation	Player
—	FW	TUR	Berkan Aslan

=== Out on loan ===
Note: Flags indicate national team as defined under FIFA eligibility rules; some limited exceptions apply. Players may hold more than one non-FIFA nationality.

No. / Pos. / Nation / Player; — / FW / TUR / Ethem Balcı (at İnegölspor until 30 June 2024)	No. / Pos. / Nation / Player; — / FW / TUR / Nurettin Korkmaz (at İnegölspor until 30 June 2024)

== Transfers ==
=== In ===
Pos.	Player	Transferred from	Fee	Date	Source
FW	(Cameroon) Stéphane Bahoken	(Turkey) Kasımpaşa	Freee	15 September 2023	
MF	(Portugal) Aylton Boa Morte	(United Arab Emirates) Khor Fakkan	Free	15 September 2023	

=== Out ===
Pos.	Player	Transferred to	Fee	Date	Source

== Pre-season and friendlies ==
Win Draw Loss Fixtures

4 August 2023 Friendly	Sivasspor (Turkey)	2–2	(Turkey) Kayserispor

19 November 2023 Friendly	Sivasspor (Turkey)	0–0	(Turkey) Kayserispor

== Competitions ==
=== Overall record ===
Competition	First match	Last match	Starting round	Record							
Competition	First match	Last match	Starting round	Pld	W	D	L	GF	GA	GD	Win %
Süper Lig	August 2023	19 May 2024	Matchday 1	14	7	5	2	19	14	+5	50.00
Turkish Cup	2 November 2023		Third round	1	1	0	0	4	0	+4	100.00
Total				15	8	5	2	23	14	+9	53.33

Last updated: 3 December 2023
Source: Soccerway

=== Süper Lig ===
==== League table ====
Pos	Team	Pld	W	D	L	GF	GA	GD	Pts
12	Adana Demirspor	38	10	14	14	54	61	−7	44 (Note: Gaziantep are ahead of Adana Demirspor on head-to-head points: Gaziantep 2–2 Adana Demirspor, Adana Demirspor 1–6 Gaziantep.)
13	Samsunspor	38	11	10	17	42	52	−10	43
14	Kayserispor (Note: 3 points deducted)	38	11	12	15	44	57	−13	42
15	Hatayspor	38	9	14	15	45	52	−7	41 (Note: Hatayspor are ahead of Konyaspor on overall goal difference.)
16	Konyaspor	38	9	14	15	40	53	−13	41

Source: Süper Lig
Rules for classification: 1) Points; 2) Head-to-head points; 3) Head-to-head goal difference; 4) Head-to-head goals scored; 5) Goal difference; 6) Goals scored; 7) Play-off.

==== Matches ====
The league fixtures were unveiled on 19 July 2023.

12 August 2023 1	Kayserispor	0–0	Galatasaray	Kayseri
21:45				Stadium: Kadir Has Stadium

18 August 2023 2	İstanbulspor	1–1	Kayserispor	Istanbul
21:00				Stadium: Esenyurt Necmi Kadıoğlu Stadium

27 August 2023 3	Kayserispor	2–1	Samsunspor	Kayseri
19:15	Uzodimma 16'; Thiam 38'	Report	Mouandilmadji 62'	Stadium: Kadir Has Stadium; Attendance: 7,166; Referee: Bahattin Şimşek

27 October 2023 10	Hatayspor	1–2	Kayserispor	Mersin
20:00				Stadium: Mersin Stadium

6 November 2023 11	Kayserispor	1–0	Alanyaspor	Kayseri
20:30				Stadium: Kadir Has Stadium

26 November 2023 13	Kayserispor	1–1	Adana Demirspor	Kayseri
13:30				Stadium: Kadir Has Stadium

3 December 2023 14	Trabzonspor	0–1	Kayserispor	Trabzon
16:00

10 December 2023 15	Kayserispor	2–0	Pendikspor	Kayseri
16:00				Stadium: Kadir Has Stadium

3 February 2024 24	Gaziantep	1–1	Kayserispor	Gaziantep
19:00 TRT (UTC+3)	Sazdağı 68' (o.g.); Maxim (yellow card) 68'; M'Bakata (yellow card) 83'		Özbek 11'; Cardoso (yellow card) 25'; Kocaman (yellow card) 67'; Bayazit (yellow card) 68'; Yılmaz (yellow card) 85'	Stadium: Gaziantep Stadium; Referee: Murat Erdoğan

12 February 2024 25	Kayserispor	0–0	Beşiktaş	Kayseri
20:00 TRT (UTC+3)	Bourabia (yellow card) 41'; Sazdağı (yellow card) 62'; Kocaman (yellow card) 89'			Stadium: Kadir Has Stadium; Referee: Kadir Sağlam

19 February 2024 26	İstanbul Başakşehir	2–3	Kayserispor	Istanbul
20:00 TRT (UTC+3)	Türüç 58'; Kemen (yellow card) 79'; Güreler 89'; Piątek (yellow card) 65', (penalty missed) 90+12'		Nazon 9'; Karimi 15'; Boa Morte 84'; Kaldırım (yellow card) 90+4'; Sazdağı (yellow card) 90+11'	Stadium: Başakşehir Fatih Terim Stadium; Referee: Oğuzhan Çakır

24 February 2024 27	Kayserispor	3–2	Ankaragücü	Kayseri
13:30 TRT (UTC+3)	Kocaman (yellow card) 10'; Boa Morte (yellow card) 33'; Civelek (yellow card) 45+6'; Nazon 53'; Jeanvier 62'; Mané 90+3', (yellow card) 90+4'		Sowe (yellow card) 30'; Bassogog 45'; Bekiroğlu 45+4'; Çankaya (yellow card) 45+6'; Radaković (yellow card) 65'	Stadium: Kadir Has Stadium; Referee: Turgut Doman

=== Turkish Cup ===
6 December 2023 Fourth round	Kayserispor	v	Vanspor FK	Kayserispor
19:00				Stadium: Kadir Has Stadium
