= 2022–23 Kayserispor season =

Kayserispor
2022–23 season
- President: Berna Gözbaşı (until 17 December 2022); Ali Çamlı (from 17 December 2022)
- Manager: Çağdaş Atan
- Stadium: Kadir Has Stadium
- Süper Lig: 9th
- Turkish Cup: Quarter-finals
- Top goalscorer: League: Mame Thiam (8 goals); All: Miguel Cardoso, Mame Thiam (8 goals each)
Home colours	Away colours	Third colours

The 2022–23 season was the 57th season in the existence of Kayserispor and the club's eighth consecutive season in the top flight of Turkish football. In addition to the domestic league, Kayserispor participated in this season's edition of the Turkish Cup. The season covers the period from 1 July 2022 to 30 June 2023.

== Players ==
=== First-team squad ===
As of 4 August 2022

Note: Flags indicate national team as defined under FIFA eligibility rules; some limited exceptions apply. Players may hold more than one non-FIFA nationality.

No.	Pos.	Nation	Player
1	GK	TUR	Cenk Gönen
3	MF	GHA	Joseph Attamah
4	DF	GRE	Dimitrios Kolovetsios
5	DF	IRI	Majid Hosseini
6	MF	IRI	Ali Karimi
7	FW	POR	Miguel Cardoso
9	FW	TUR	Mustafa Pektemek
10	MF	CMR	Olivier Kemen
11	FW	TUR	Gökhan Sazdağı
12	GK	TUR	Abdulkadir Taşdan
17	MF	TUR	Emrah Başsan
19	FW	SUI	Mario Gavranović
20	FW	POR	Carlos Mané
21	DF	FRA	Lionel Carole
22	FW	TUR	Hayrullah Erkip
23	FW	TUR	Ilhan Parlak (captain)
25	GK	NED	Bilal Bayazit

No.	Pos.	Nation	Player
27	FW	SEN	Mame Thiam
28	MF	TUR	Ramazan Civelek
29	MF	TUR	Mehmet Eray Özbek
30	FW	TUR	Talha Sarıarslan
35	MF	TUR	Emin Can Uysal
38	DF	TUR	Onur Bulut
39	GK	TUR	Şamil Öztürk
40	DF	TUR	Muhammed Eren Arıkan
42	FW	TUR	Ethem Balcı
43	MF	GHA	Bernard Mensah
54	DF	TUR	Arif Kocaman
77	FW	TUR	Nurettin Korkmaz
80	MF	NGR	Anthony Uzodimma
88	DF	BRA	Gustavo Campanharo
89	MF	GHA	Yaw Ackah
91	MF	ITA	Andrea Bertolacci

=== Out on loan ===
Note: Flags indicate national team as defined under FIFA eligibility rules; some limited exceptions apply. Players may hold more than one non-FIFA nationality.

No.	Pos.	Nation	Player
—	FW	TUR	Taner Gümüş (at Şanlıurfaspor)

== Pre-season and friendlies ==
Win Draw Loss Fixtures

20 July 2022 Friendly	Kayserispor (Turkey)	2–1	(Turkey) Alanyaspor	Kayseri
18:00 TRT (UTC+3)	Gavranović 30'; Bertolacci 42'	Report	Hosseini 55' (o.g.)	Stadium: Kadir Has Tesisleri

30 July 2022 Friendly	Kayserispor (Turkey)	3–2	(Turkey) Yeni Malatyaspor	Kayseri
18:30 TRT (UTC+3)	Gavranović 47'; Thiam 53' (pen.); Carlos Mané 70'	Report	Osman 66'; Emeksiz 68'	Stadium: Kadir Has Tesisleri

24 September 2022 Friendly	Kayserispor (Turkey)	0–0	(Turkey) Giresunspor	Kayseri
17:00 TRT (UTC+3)				Stadium: Erciyes Yüksek İrtifa Kamp Merkezi

5 December 2022 Friendly	Kayserispor (Turkey)	2–1	(Germany) 1. FC Saarbrücken	Kadriye
15:00 TRT (UTC+3)	Civelek 4'; Thiam 36'		Gnaase 1'	Stadium: Hüseyin Aygün Football Center

9 December 2022 Friendly	Kayserispor (Turkey)	5–3	(Turkey) Giresunspor	Kadriye
15:00 TRT (UTC+3)	Gavranović 10'; Thiam 29'; Mané 68'; Sarıarslan 73' (pen.); Pektemek 88'		Bajić 31'; Serginho 40'; Savićević 82'	Stadium: Hüseyin Aygün Football Center

== Competitions ==
=== Overall record ===
Competition	First match	Last match	Starting round	Final position	Record							
Competition	First match	Last match	Starting round	Final position	Pld	W	D	L	GF	GA	GD	Win %
Süper Lig	6 August 2022	6 June 2023	Matchday 1	9th	36	15	5	16	55	61	−6	41.67
Turkish Cup	18 October 2022	6 April 2023	Third round	Quarter-finals	5	4	0	1	8	5	+3	80.00
Total					41	19	5	17	63	66	−3	46.34

Source: Competitions

=== Süper Lig ===
==== League table ====
Pos	Team	Pld	W	D	L	GF	GA	GD	Pts
7	Fatih Karagümrük	36	13	12	11	75	63	+12	51
8	Konyaspor	36	12	15	9	49	41	+8	51
9	Kayserispor	36	15	5	16	55	61	−6	47 (Note: Reduction of 3 points by decision of the Turkish Federation.)
10	Kasımpaşa	36	12	7	17	45	61	−16	43
11	Ankaragücü	36	12	6	18	43	53	−10	42

Source: Süper Lig
Rules for classification: 1) Points; 2) Head-to-head points; 3) Head-to-head goal difference; 4) Head-to-head goals scored; 5) Goal difference; 6) Goals scored; 7) Play-off.

==== Results summary ====
Overall								Home						Away					
Pld	W	D	L	GF	GA	GD	Pts	W	D	L	GF	GA	GD	W	D	L	GF	GA	GD
36	15	5	16	55	61	−6	50	9	2	7	28	22	+6	6	3	9	27	39	−12

Source: Spor Toto Süper Lig

==== Results by round ====
Round	1	2	3	4	5	6	7	8	9	10	11	12	13	14	15	16	17	18	19	20	21	22	23	24	25	26	27	28	29	30	31	32	33	34	35	36	37	38
Ground	A	H	A	H	A	H	A	H	A	H	A	H	A	H		A	H	A	H	H	A	H	A	H	A	H	A	H	A	H	A	H	A		H	A	H	A
Result	L	W	L	W	L	W	W	L	D	W	W	D	W	L	B	L	L	L	W	L	W	W	W	L	L	W	W	W	L	D	L	W	D	B	L	L	L	D
Position	16	11	12	9	9	9	8	8	8	8	7	8	5	7	8	8	8	9	8	8	7	7	7	7	7	7	7	7	7	7	7	6	6	7	8	8	8	9

Source: Spor Toto Süper Lig
A = Away; H = Home; B = Bye; W = Win; D = Draw; L = Loss

==== Matches ====
The league schedule was released on 4 July.

6 August 2022 1	Beşiktaş	1–0	Kayserispor	Istanbul
21:45 TRT (UTC+3)	Fernandes (yellow card) 77'; Tosun (yellow card) 90+1' (yellow-red card) 90+3'; Ghezzal 90+6'; Uysal (yellow card) 90+9'	Report	Karimi (yellow card) 59' (yellow card) 67' (red card)	Stadium: Vodafone Park; Attendance: 33,046; Referee: Ümit Öztürk

13 August 2022 2	Kayserispor	1–0	İstanbulspor	Kayseri
19:15 TRT (UTC+3)	Cardoso 4' (yellow card) 32'; Bertolacci (yellow card) 52'; Ackah (yellow card) 87'	Report	Yaşar (yellow card) 49'; Aksu (yellow card) 76'	Stadium: Kadir Has Stadium; Attendance: 6,776; Referee: Suat Arslanboğa

21 August 2022 3	İstanbul Başakşehir	2–0	Kayserispor	Istanbul
19:15 TRT (UTC+3)	Chadli 22'; Türüç (yellow card) 26'; Lima (yellow card) 44'; Özcan 49'; Aleksić (yellow card) 59'; Touba (yellow card) 61'; Crivelli (yellow card) 90+1'	Report		Stadium: Fatih Terim Stadium; Attendance: 1,797; Referee: Yaşar Kemal Uğurlu

28 August 2022 4	Kayserispor	3–0	Giresunspor	Kayseri
19:15 TRT (UTC+3)	Bulut 22'; Thiam (penalty missed) 45+5'; Gavranović 72'; Kolovetsios (yellow card) 84'; Civelek 87'	Report	Pérez (yellow card) 45+4'; Uludağ (yellow card) 74'	Stadium: Kadir Has Stadium; Attendance: 7,580; Referee: Sarper Barış Saka

3 September 2022 5	Fenerbahçe	2–0	Kayserispor	Istanbul
21:45 TRT (UTC+3)	João Pedro 37'; King 50'; Kadıoğlu (yellow card) 70'; Szalai (yellow card) 87'	Report	Campanharo (yellow card) 75'; Mensah (yellow card) 82'	Stadium: Şükrü Saracoğlu Stadium; Attendance: 38,827; Referee: Ali Palabıyık

11 September 2022 6	Kayserispor	1–0	Antalyaspor	Kayseri
20:00 TRT (UTC+3)	Thiam 54'; Cardoso (yellow card) 76'; Carole (yellow card) 89'	Report	Kudryashov (yellow card) 77'; Vural (yellow card) 90+2'	Stadium: Kadir Has Stadium; Attendance: 6,888; Referee: Bahattin Şimşek

16 September 2022 7	Hatayspor	0–4	Kayserispor	Hatay
20:00 TRT (UTC+3)	Falette (red card) 89'	Report	Mensah 5' (pen.); Cardoso 44'; Bayazit (yellow card) 75'; Bertolacci 87'; Gavranović 90' (pen.)	Stadium: New Hatay Stadium; Attendance: 4,416; Referee: Çağdaş Altay

1 October 2022 8	Kayserispor	1–2	Trabzonspor	Kayseri
17:00 TRT (UTC+3)	Gavranović 24', (yellow card) 55'; Bulut (yellow card) 77'; Kemen (yellow card) 86'; Kolovetsios (yellow card) 90+4'	Report	Trézéguet (yellow card) 14'; Bakasetas 78' (pen.); Bozok 83'; Elmalı (yellow card) 90+1'; Gómez (yellow card) 90+2'	Stadium: Kadir Has Stadium; Attendance: 10,448; Referee: Ümit Öztürk

9 October 2022 9	Ümraniyespor	2–2	Kayserispor	Istanbul
14:30 TRT (UTC+3)	Sackey (yellow card) 44'; Nayir 48'; Glumac 59' (yellow card) 90+2' (red card); Gürbulak (yellow card) 62'; Gheorghe (yellow card) 87'	Report	Cardoso 25'; Mensah 64' (pen.)	Stadium: Ümraniye Municipality City Stadium; Attendance: 369; Referee: Burak Şeker

15 October 2022 10	Kayserispor	2–1	Galatasaray	Kayseri
20:00 TRT (UTC+3)	Gavranović 22'; Bulut 34'; Kemen (yellow card) 38'; Cardoso (yellow card) 66'	Report	Boey (yellow card) 28'; Yılmaz 86'	Stadium: Kadir Has Stadium; Attendance: 16,441; Referee: Arda Kardeşler

23 October 2022 11	Kasımpaşa	0–1	Kayserispor	Istanbul
14:30 TRT (UTC+3)	Ouanes (yellow card) 47'; Çiftpınar (yellow card) 51'	Report	Thiam 43'; Hosseini (yellow card) 69'	Stadium: Recep Tayyip Erdoğan Stadium; Attendance: 1,954; Referee: Mustafa Kürşad Filiz

30 October 2022 12	Kayserispor	2–2	Adana Demirspor	Kayseri
17:00 TRT (UTC+3)	Civelek (yellow card) 8'; Mensah (yellow card) 26'; Gavranović 67'; Hosseini (yellow card) 78'; Cardoso 82'	Report	Ndiaye 12' (yellow card) 38'; Onyekuru 65' (yellow card) 76'	Stadium: Kadir Has Stadium; Attendance: 10,365; Referee: Volkan Bayarslan

6 November 2022 13	Gaziantep	1–2	Kayserispor	Gaziantep
14:30 TRT (UTC+3)	Figueiredo (yellow card) 31'; Soyalp 52' (yellow card) 59'; Kitsiou (yellow card) 90+2'	Report	Kemen 41'; Sazdağı (yellow card) 51'; Cardoso (yellow card) 53'; Hosseini (yellow card) 83'; Civelek 88'; Carole (yellow card) 90+2'; Parlak (yellow card) 90+3'	Stadium: Gaziantep Stadium; Attendance: 4,791; Referee: Erkan Özdamar

13 November 2022 14	Kayserispor	1–2	Konyaspor	Kayseri
17:00 TRT (UTC+3)	Hosseini 8' (yellow card) 90'; Başsan (yellow card) 20'; Gavranović (yellow card) 37'; Sazdağı (yellow card) 89'	Report	Calvo 9'; Diouf 22' (pen.); Paz (yellow card) 58'; Ülgün (yellow card) 66'; Guilherme (yellow card) 68'; Amilton (yellow card) 90'	Stadium: Kadir Has Stadium; Attendance: 12,102; Referee: Kadir Sağlam

15	Bye

28 December 2022 16	Alanyaspor	3–1	Kayserispor	Antalya
17:00 TRT (UTC+3)	Hassan 21'; Özdemir (yellow card) 32' (goal) 36'; Cavaleiro (yellow card) 45+3'; Karaca 72' (pen.); Rúnarsson (yellow card) 80'	Report	Mensah (yellow card) 29'; Karimi 59' (yellow card) 90+8'; Carole (yellow card) 61'; Cardoso (yellow card) 78'	Stadium: Kırbıyık Holding Stadium; Attendance: 1,581; Referee: Tugay Kaan Numanoğlu

4 January 2023 17	Kayserispor	2–4	Fatih Karagümrük	Kayseri
17:00 TRT (UTC+3)	Mensah 57' (pen.) (yellow card) 90+4'; Parlak 72'	Report	Mercan 1'; Diagne 12', 63'; Shukurov 47' (yellow card) 52'; Şen (yellow card) 90+6'; Kazim-Richards (yellow card) 90+6'	Stadium: Kadir Has Stadium; Attendance: 2,682; Referee: Suat Arslanboğa

8 January 2023 18	Ankaragücü	2–1	Kayserispor	Ankara
16:00 TRT (UTC+3)	Diack (yellow card) 23'; Sowe 38'; Kılınç 63'; Mujakić (yellow card) 45+2'; Ciğerci (yellow card) 72'	Report	Cardoso 15'; Pektemek (yellow card) 90+5'	Stadium: Eryaman Stadium; Attendance: 9,664; Referee: Ümit Öztürk

13 January 2023 19	Kayserispor	4–1	Sivasspor	Kayseri
19:00 TRT (UTC+3)	Hosseini 23' (yellow card) 80'; Kemen 31', 69'; Sazdağı 41'; Kolovetsios (yellow card) 80'	Report	Osmanpaşa (yellow card) 25'; Ulvestad (yellow card) 40'; Yalçın 52' (yellow card) 80'; Yeşilyurt (yellow card) 54'; Erdal (yellow card) 80'	Stadium: Kadir Has Stadium; Attendance: 6,838; Referee: Arda Kardeşler

22 January 2023 20	Kayserispor	0–2	Beşiktaş	Kayseri
16:00 TRT (UTC+3)	Mensah (yellow card) 23'	Report	Redmond 2' (yellow card) 33'; Saïss (yellow card) 4'; Uçan 42'; Rosier (red card) 90+4'	Stadium: Kadir Has Stadium; Attendance: 14,489; Referee: Mete Kalkavan

29 January 2023 21	İstanbulspor	2–4	Kayserispor	Istanbul
13:30 TRT (UTC+3)	Lokilo 10'; Ethemi 32'	Report	Carlos Mané 18'; Bulut 52'; Kemen (yellow card) 65'; Başsan 83'; Parlak 89'	Stadium: Necmi Kadıoğlu Stadium; Attendance: 810; Referee: Murat Erdoğan

2 February 2023 22	Kayserispor	1–0	İstanbul Başakşehir	Kayseri
17:00 TRT (UTC+3)	Kemen (yellow card) 27'; Carole (yellow card) 45+5'; Karimi 49'	Report	Karzev (yellow card) 79'	Stadium: Kadir Has Stadium; Referee: Kadir Sağlam

25 February 2023 23	Giresunspor	1–2	Kayserispor	Giresun
19:00 TRT (UTC+3)	Bilazer (yellow card) 33'; Arias (yellow card) 54'; Serginho (yellow card) 55'; Bajić 58'	Report	Mané 6'; Karimi (yellow card) 28'; Thiam (yellow card) 33' (goal) 40'; Hosseini (yellow card) 58'; Bayazit (yellow card) 59'; Attamah (yellow card) 65'; Uzodimma (yellow card) 84'; Civelek (yellow card) 90+7'	Stadium: Çotanak Sports Complex; Referee: Ali Şansalan

4 March 2023 24	Kayserispor	1–2	Fenerbahçe	Kayseri
19:00 TRT (UTC+3)	Kocaman 90+6'	Report	Valencia 6'; Szalai (yellow card) 58'; Kadıoğlu 67'	Stadium: Kadir Has Stadium; Referee: Atilla Karaoğlan

11 March 2023 25	Antalyaspor	4–0	Kayserispor	Antalya
16:00 TRT (UTC+3)	Wright 33', 68'; Fernando (yellow card) 41'; Fredy 52'; Yıldırım 90+7'	Report		Stadium: Antalya Stadium; Referee: Volkan Bayarslan

26	Kayserispor	3–0 (w/o)	Hatayspor	Kayseri
		Report		Stadium: Kadir Has Stadium

1 April 2023 27	Trabzonspor	3–4	Kayserispor	Trabzon
16:00 TRT (UTC+3)	Gómez 3'; Ömür 50'; Bardhi 54' (pen.)	Report	Başsan 1'; Thiam 20'; Sazdağı (yellow card) 22'; Mensah 48' (pen.); Mané 64'	Stadium: Şenol Güneş Sports Complex; Referee: Erkan Özdamar

10 April 2023 28	Kayserispor	3–1	Ümraniyespor	Kayseri
16:00 TRT (UTC+3)	Thiam 31' (pen.); Kemen (yellow card) 44'; Mensah 53'; Parlak (yellow card) 90+1'; Ackah (yellow card) 90+1'; Cardoso (yellow card) 90+5'; Mané 90+9'	Report	Nayir 45+2'; Mršić (yellow card) 59'; Sackey (yellow card) 87' (yellow-red card) 90+8'; Yılmaz (yellow card) 90+5'	Stadium: Kadir Has Stadium; Referee: Zorbay Küçük

14 April 2023 29	Galatasaray	6–0	Kayserispor	Istanbul
20:30 TRT (UTC+3)	Icardi 18', 42' (pen.), 45+12' (penalty missed) 45+12'; Rashica 24'; Mertens (yellow card) 35'; Aktürkoğlu 59'; Zaniolo 71'; Adekugbe (yellow card) 80'	Report	Hosseini (red card) 45+10'	Stadium: Nef Stadium; Referee: Mustafa Kürşad Filiz

19 April 2023 30	Kayserispor	0–0	Kasımpaşa	Kayseri
17:00 TRT (UTC+3)	Kemen (yellow card) 12'	Report	Koita (yellow card) 11'; Tırpan (yellow card) 30'; Djilobodji (red card) 90+3'	Stadium: Kadir Has Stadium; Referee: Hüseyin Göçek

23 April 2023 31	Adana Demirspor	5–3	Kayserispor	Adana
16:00 TRT (UTC+3)	Ndiaye 7', 27'; Belhanda 32'; Sarı 45+6'; Çokçalış (yellow card) 46'; Onyekuru 52' (pen.); Akbaba (yellow card) 87'	Report	Thiam 24', 30', 45+4'; Kocaman (yellow card) 51'; Cardoso (yellow card) 59'; Mensah (yellow card) 76'; Bayazıt (red card) 83'	Stadium: New Adana Stadium; Referee: Direnç Tonusluoğlu

32	Kayserispor	3–0 (w/o)	Gaziantep	Kayseri
		Report		Stadium: Kadir Has Stadium

7 May 2023 33	Konyaspor	2–2	Kayserispor	Konya
16:00 TRT (UTC+3)	Oğuz (yellow card) 38'; Yazğılı 48'; Dikmen 55'	Report	Sazdağı (yellow card) 41'; Cardoso 46', 52'	Stadium: Konya Metropolitan Municipality Stadium; Referee: Tugay Kaan Numanoğlu

34	Bye

20 May 2023 35	Kayserispor	0–4	Alanyaspor	Kayseri
19:00 TRT (UTC+3)		Report	Yardımcı 8', 16'; Candeias (yellow card) 43'; Koulouris 65'; Rúnarsson (yellow card) 84'; Balkovec 90+2'	Stadium: Kadir Has Stadium; Referee: Yasin Kol

30 May 2023 36	Fatih Karagümrük	2–0	Kayserispor	Istanbul
20:00 TRT (UTC+3)	Frei 16', 28'; Bertolacci (yellow card) 57'; Drešević (yellow card) 77'	Report	Ackah (red card) 8'; Cardoso (yellow card) 82'; Mensah (yellow card) 87'	Stadium: Atatürk Olympic Stadium; Referee: Murat Erdoğan

3 June 2023 37	Kayserispor	0–1	Ankaragücü	Kayseri
19:00 TRT (UTC+3)		Report	Çankaya (yellow card) 12'; Kitsiou 24'	Stadium: Kadir Has Stadium; Referee: Cihan Aydın

6 June 2023 38	Sivasspor	1–1	Kayserispor	Sivas
17:00 TRT (UTC+3)	Osmanpaşa 10'	Report	Uzodimma 18'; Thiam (yellow card) 51'	Stadium: New Sivas 4 Eylül Stadium; Referee: Burak Pakkan

=== Turkish Cup ===
18 October 2022 Third round	Kayserispor	2–1	Iğdır	Kayseri
17:30 TRT (UTC+3)	Parlak 3'; Hosseini 83'	Report	Kurt 47', (yellow card) 68'; Yıldızaç (yellow card) 68'	Stadium: Kadir Has Stadium; Referee: Abdullah Buğra Taşkınsoy

10 November 2022 Fourth round	Kayserispor	1–0	Sivas Belediyespor	Kayseri
21:00 TRT (UTC+3)	Başsan 48'	Report	Belen (yellow card) 45+1'; Yıldız (yellow card) 49'; İnan (yellow card) 71'	Stadium: Kadir Has Stadium; Referee: Yasin Kol

22 December 2022 Fifth round	Kayserispor	2–0	Gençlerbirliği	Kayseri
13:00 TRT (UTC+3)	Sazdağı 70'; Pektemek 76'	Report		Stadium: Kadir Has Stadium

17 January 2023 Round of 16	Antalyaspor	0–2 (a.e.t.)	Kayserispor	Antalya
17:30 TRT (UTC+3)		Report	Ackah (yellow card) 47'; Cardoso (yellow card) 53', (goal) 105'; Kocaman (yellow card) 59'; Balcı 120'	Stadium: Akdeniz University Stadium; Referee: Cihan Aydın

6 April 2023 Quarter-finals	Fenerbahçe	4–1	Kayserispor	Istanbul
20:30 TRT (UTC+3)	Mor 8', 42'; Dursun 58'; Yandaş (yellow card) 73'; Güler 90'	Report	Kolovetsios 18'; Mensah (yellow card) 76'	Stadium: Şükrü Saracoğlu Stadium; Referee: Volkan Bayarslan
