= 2020–21 Kayserispor season =

Kayserispor
2020–21 season
- Chairman: Berna Gözbaşı
- Manager: Bayram Bektaş (until 1 November); Samet Aybaba (from 11 November to 4 January); Dan Petrescu (from 10 January)
- Stadium: Kadir Has Stadium
- Süper Lig: 17th
- Turkish Cup: Fourth round
- Top goalscorer: League: Pedro Henrique (6); All: Pedro Henrique (6)
Home colours	Away colours	Third colours

The 2020–21 Kayserispor season was the club's 55th season in existence and the club's sixth consecutive season in the top flight of Turkish football. In addition to the domestic league, Kayserispor participated in this season's editions of the Turkish Cup. The season covered the period from July 2020 to 30 June 2021.

== Players ==
=== First-team squad ===
As of 14 March 2021

Note: Flags indicate national team as defined under FIFA eligibility rules; some limited exceptions apply. Players may hold more than one non-FIFA nationality.

No.	Pos.	Nation	Player
1	GK	TUR	İsmail Çipe (on loan from Galatasaray)
2	DF	ARG	Nehuén Paz (on loan from Bologna)
3	DF	GHA	Joseph Attamah
4	DF	GRE	Dimitrios Kolovetsios
5	DF	TUR	Oğuzhan Çapar
6	MF	POR	Manuel Fernandes
7	MF	COD	Harrison Manzala
9	FW	FRA	Wilfried Kanga
10	FW	BRA	Pedro Henrique
11	FW	TUR	Muğdat Çelik
12	GK	TUR	Abdulkadir Taşdan
13	DF	POR	Miguel Lopes
14	MF	TUR	Emre Demir
15	DF	TUR	Uğur Demirok
16	GK	TUR	Doğan Alemdar
17	FW	TUR	Nurettin Korkmaz

No.	Pos.	Nation	Player
18	DF	BIH	Zoran Kvržić
19	FW	TUR	Ömer Uzun
20	DF	TUR	Ramazan Civelek
21	DF	AUS	Aziz Behich (on loan from İstanbul Başakşehir)
22	DF	ROU	Cristian Săpunaru (captain)
23	FW	TUR	İlhan Parlak
25	MF	ENG	Aaron Lennon
32	DF	TUR	Yasir Subaşı
33	GK	ROU	Silviu Lung Jr.
42	FW	NED	Kevin Luckassen
44	MF	SWE	Besard Šabović
73	MF	CRO	Karlo Muhar
77	FW	ROU	Denis Alibec
88	MF	BRA	Gustavo Campanharo
96	MF	MKD	Daniel Avramovski

=== Out on loan ===
Note: Flags indicate national team as defined under FIFA eligibility rules; some limited exceptions apply. Players may hold more than one non-FIFA nationality.

No.	Pos.	Nation	Player
—	GK	TUR	Umut Eren Tunç (at Sultanbeyli Belediyespor)
—	DF	TUR	Mert Kula (at Ankara Keçiörengücü)
—	MF	GHA	Bernard Mensah (at Beşiktaş)

No.	Pos.	Nation	Player
—	MF	TUR	Furkan Polat (at Kırşehir Belediyespor)
—	MF	NGR	Anthony Uzodimma (at Giresunspor)
—	MF	GHA	Yaw Ackah (at BB Erzurumspor)

== Transfers ==
=== In ===
No.	Pos	Player	Transferred from	Fee	Date	Source
15			TBD		1 July 2020	

=== Out ===
No.	Pos	Player	Transferred to	Fee	Date	Source
15			TBD		1 July 2020	

== Pre-season and friendlies ==
Win Draw Loss Fixtures

== Competitions ==
=== Overview ===
Competition	First match	Last match	Starting round	Final position	Record							
Competition	First match	Last match	Starting round	Final position	Pld	W	D	L	GF	GA	GD	Win %
Süper Lig	12 September 2020	15 May 2021	Matchday 1	17th	40	9	14	17	35	52	−17	22.50
Turkish Cup	4 November 2020	26 November 2020	Third round	Fourth round	2	1	1	0	8	3	+5	50.00
Total					42	10	15	17	43	55	−12	23.81

Source: Soccerway

=== Süper Lig ===
==== League table ====
Pos	Team	Pld	W	D	L	GF	GA	GD	Pts	Qualification or relegation
15	Yeni Malatyaspor	40	10	15	15	49	53	−4	45	
16	Antalyaspor	40	9	17	14	41	55	−14	44	
17	Kayserispor	40	9	14	17	35	52	−17	41	
18	BB Erzurumspor (R)	40	10	10	20	44	68	−24	40	Relegation to TFF First League
19	Ankaragücü (R)	40	10	8	22	46	65	−19	38	Relegation to TFF First League

Source: Süper Lig, Soccerway
Rules for classification: 1) Points; 2) Head-to-head points; 3) Head-to-head goal difference; 4) Head-to-head goals scored; 5) Goal difference; 6) Goals scored; 7) Play-off.
(R) Relegated

==== Results summary ====
Overall								Home						Away					
Pld	W	D	L	GF	GA	GD	Pts	W	D	L	GF	GA	GD	W	D	L	GF	GA	GD
35	8	11	16	27	46	−19	35	4	6	7	13	20	−7	4	5	9	14	26	−12

Source: FBref

==== Results by round ====
Round	1	2	3	4	5	6	7	8	9	10	11	12	13	14	15	16	17	18	19	20	21	22	23	24	25	26	27	28	29	30	31	32	33	34	35	36	37	38	39	40	41	42
Ground	H	A	H	A	H	B	A	H	A	H	A	H	A	H	A	H	A	H	A	H	A	A	H	A	H	A	B	H	A	H	A	H	A	H	A	H	A	H	A	H	A	H
Result	W	L	L	W	L	B	L	L	D	D	D	D	L	L	L	L	W	W	L	W	L	W	D	D	D	L	B	W	W	L	L	D	D	L	D	D	L					
Position	10	12	14	10	12	17	17	18	18	18	17	18	18	19	21	21	20	18	18	17	17	17	17	16	16	16	16	15	14	16	16	18	18	18	17	17	18					

Source: TFF.org
A = Away; H = Home; B = Bye; W = Win; D = Draw; L = Loss

Note: Since the league has been expanded to 21 teams each team will earn a bye twice this season.

==== Matches ====
13 September 2020 1	Kayserispor	1–0	Kasımpaşa	Kayseri
17:00 TRT (UTC+3)	Kvržić 2'	Report		Stadium: Kadir Has Stadium; Attendance: 0 Referee: Yaşar Kemal Uğurlu

19 September 2020 2	Alanyaspor	2–0	Kayserispor	Alanya
20:00 TRT (UTC+3)	Bareiro 45+5' 77'; Tzavellas (yellow card) 75'	Report	Acar (yellow card) 54'; Attamah (yellow card) 64'; Demir (yellow card) 89'	Stadium: Bahçeşehir Okulları Stadium; Attendance: 0 Referee: Erkan Özdamar

26 September 2020 3	Kayserispor	1–3	BB Erzurumspor	Kayseri
13:30 TRT (UTC+3)	Henrique 83' (pen.)	Report	Muhammed 42'; Novikovas 45+4'; Sissoko 90+5'	Stadium: Kadir Has Stadium; Attendance: 0 Referee: Tugay Kaan Numanoğlu

2 October 2020 4	Ankaragücü	0–1	Kayserispor	Ankara
20:00 TRT (UTC+3)		Report	Parlak 42'	Stadium: Eryaman Stadium; Attendance: 0 Referee: Bahattin Şimşek

17 October 2020 5	Kayserispor	1–3	Sivasspor	Kayseri
16:00 TRT (UTC+3)	Kanga 52'; Săpunaru (red card) 75'	Report	Erdal 28'; Yatabaré 60'; Fajr 83'	Stadium: Kadir Has Stadium; Attendance: 0 Referee: Halil Umut Meler

6	BYE

1 November 2020 7	Çaykur Rizespor	1–0	Kayserispor	Rize
13:30 TRT (UTC+3)	Rémy 33'	Report		Stadium: Yeni Rize Şehir Stadium; Referee: Koray Gençerler

8 November 2020 8	Kayserispor	0–1	Hatayspor	Kayseri
16:00 TRT (UTC+3)	Henrique (yellow card) 44' (yellow-red card) 54'; Ackah (yellow card) 66'; Kolovetsios (yellow card) 71'	Report	Sackey (yellow card) 7'; Diouf 64'; Aabid (yellow card) 79'	Stadium: Kadir Has Stadium; Attendance: 0 Referee: Volkan Bayarslan

23 November 2020 9	Galatasaray	1–1	Kayserispor	Istanbul
19:30 TRT (UTC+3)	Emre Akbaba (yellow card) 40'; Diagne 46' (pen.)	Report	Fernandes (yellow card) 48'; Muğdat (yellow card) 20' (yellow-red card) 62'; Campanharo 71'; Behich (yellow card) 78'	Stadium: Türk Telekom Stadium; Attendance: 0 Referee: Turgut Doman

30 November 2020 10	Kayserispor	0–0	Fatih Karagümrük	Kayseri
19:30 TRT (UTC+3)		Report		Stadium: Kadir Has Stadium; Attendance: 0 Referee: Alper Ulusoy; Fourth official: Kadir Sağlam

5 December 2020 11	Göztepe	1–1	Kayserispor	Göztepe
13:30 TRT (UTC+3)	Aydoğdu 86'	Report	Henrique 73'	Stadium: Gürsel Aksel Stadium; Attendance: 0 Referee: Yaşar Kemal

12 December 2020 12	Kayserispor	0–0	Trabzonspor	Kayseri
16:00 TRT (UTC+3)		Report	João Pereira (yellow card) 10'; Bilal Başaçıkoğlu (yellow card) 57'; Abdülkadir Parmak (yellow card) 57'	Stadium: Kadir Has Stadium; Attendance: 0 Referee: Burak Şeker

21 December 2020 13	Antalyaspor	2–0	Kayserispor	Antalya
19:00 TRT (UTC+3)	Sam (yellow card) 34' (goal) 41'; Amilton 37' (yellow card) 37'; Şahin (yellow card) 90+6'; Naldo (yellow card) 90+7'	Report	(yellow card) 86' Campanharo	Stadium: Antalya Stadium; Attendance: 0 Referee: Ümit Öztürk

24 December 2020 14	Kayserispor	1–2	Konyaspor	Kayseri
16:00 TRT (UTC+3)	Henrique 45+5' (pen.) (yellow card) 51'; Lennon (yellow card) 54' (yellow-red card) 64'	Report	Demirok 89' (pen.); Jevtović (yellow card) 45+1' (goal) 90+8'	Stadium: Kayseri; Attendance: 0 Referee: Ali Palabıyık; Fourth official: Burak Pakkan

28 December 2020 15	Gençlerbirliği	3–2	Kayserispor	Ankara
16:00 TRT (UTC+3)		Report		Stadium: Eryaman Stadium; Attendance: 0 Referee: Cüneyt Çakιr

3 January 2021 16	Kayserispor	0–2	Beşiktaş	Kayseri
19:00 TRT (UTC+3)	Kvržić (yellow card) 62'; Lopes (yellow card) 88' (yellow-red card) 90+10'	Report	Mensah (penalty missed) 12'; Welinton (yellow card) 40'; Nkoudou 89' (pen.); Hasić 90+6'	Stadium: Kadir Has Stadium; Attendance: 0 Referee: Fırat Aydınus

6 January 2021 17	Denizlispor	0–1	Kayserispor	Denizli
13:30 TRT (UTC+3)	Muhammet Özkal (yellow card) 34'; Fabiano Leismann (yellow card) 62'	Report	21' (yellow card) 34' Pedro Henrique; (yellow card) 33' Denis Alibec; (yellow card) 54' Yaw Ackah; (yellow card) 72' Daniel Avramovski; (yellow card) 88' Doğan Alemdar; (yellow card) 90+2' Nurettin Korkmaz	Stadium: Atatürk Stadium; Attendance: 0 Referee: Ali Şansalan; Assistant referees: Cevdet Kömürcüoğlu, Murat Altan; Fourth official: Alper Çetin

9 January 2021 18	Kayserispor	1–0	Yeni Malatyaspor	Kayseri
16:00 TRT (UTC+3)	Kaya 10' (o.g.)	Report		Stadium: Kadir Has Stadium; Attendance: 0 Referee: Erkan Özdamar

16 January 2021 19	Gaziantep	2–1	Kayserispor	Gaziantep
16:00 TRT (UTC+3)	Kvržić 31' (o.g.); Maxim 77' (pen.)	Report	Kolovetsios 61'	Stadium: Gaziantep Arena; Attendance: 0 Referee: Halil Umut Meler

19 January 2021 20	Kayserispor	2–0	İstanbul Başakşehir	Kayseri
16:00 TRT (UTC+3)	Alibec 42', 77'; Săpunaru (yellow card) 90+1'	Report		Stadium: Kadir Has Stadium; Attendance: 0 Referee: Serkan Tokat

25 January 2021 21	Fenerbahçe	3–0	Kayserispor	Istanbul
19:00 TRT (UTC+3)	Enner Valencia (yellow card) 18'; Mame Thiam 20'; Mbwana Samatta 51'; Dimitrios Pelkas (yellow card) 69'; Papiss Cissé 86'	Report	(yellow card) 63' Nurettin Korkmaz	Stadium: Şükrü Saracoğlu Stadium; Attendance: 0 Referee: Alper Ulusoy; Assistant referees: Kerem Ersoy, Cevdet Kömürcüoğlu; Fourth official: Mustafa Kürşad Filiz

30 January 2021 22	Kasımpaşa	0–1	Kayserispor	Istanbul
13:30 TRT (UTC+3)		Report	Demirok 90+4'	Stadium: Recep Tayyip Erdoğan Stadium; Attendance: 0 Referee: Hüseyin Göçek; Fourth official: Yiğit Arslan

3 February 2021 23	Kayserispor	1–1	Alanyaspor	Kayseri
16:00 TRT (UTC+3)	Henrique (yellow card) 40'; Maglica 54'; Cristian Săpunaru (yellow card) 70' (yellow-red card) 77'; Parlak (yellow card) 77'; Alemdar (yellow card) 77'; Paz (yellow card) 81'	Report	Babacar (yellow card) 45'; Tzavellas 79'	Stadium: Kadir Has Stadium; Attendance: 0 Referee: Atilla Karaoğlan

7 February 2021 24	BB Erzurumspor	1–1	Kayserispor	Erzurum
13:30 TRT (UTC+3)	Chahechouhe 28' (pen.); Ackah (yellow card) 34' (yellow-red card) 34'	Report	Parlak 72'	Stadium: Kazım Karabekir Stadium; Attendance: 0 Referee: Yaşar Kemal Uğurlu

13 February 2021 25	Kayserispor	0–0	Ankaragücü	Kayseri
13:30 TRT (UTC+3)		Report		Stadium: Kadir Has Stadium; Attendance: 0 Referee: Halil Umut Meler

21 February 2021 26	Sivasspor	2–0	Kayserispor	Sivas
16:00 TRT (UTC+3)	Camara (yellow card) 8'; Gradel 18'; Çiftçi (yellow card) 84'; Yıldırım (yellow card) 87'; Yeşilyurt 90+2' (pen.)	Report	Kvržić (yellow card) 12'; Muhar (yellow card) 45+2'; Campanharo (yellow card) 67'; Demirok (yellow card) 73'; Behich (yellow card) 84'	Stadium: 4 Eylül Stadium; Attendance: 0 Referee: Ali Şansalan

27	BYE

3 March 2021 28	Kayserispor	2–1	Çaykur Rizespor	Kayseri
19:00 TRT (UTC+3)	Muhar 48'; Parlak 77'	Report	Samudio 73'	Stadium: Kadir Has Stadium; Attendance: 0 Referee: Hüseyin Göçek

7 March 2021 29	Hatayspor	1–3	Kayserispor	Antakya
16:00 TRT (UTC+3)	Koné (red card) 52'; Palblo 54'	Report	Parlak 24'; Demirok 36'; Henrique 58'	Stadium: Hatay New Stadium; Attendance: 0 Referee: Yaşar Kemal Uğurlu

13 March 2021 30	Kayserispor	0–3	Galatasaray	Kayseri
19:00 TRT (UTC+3)	Uğur (yellow card) 41'; Muhar (yellow card) 76'	Report	Taylan (yellow card) 35'; Falcao 43'; Onyekuru 81', 89'	Stadium: Kadir Has Stadium; Attendance: 0 Referee: Halis Özkahya

19 March 2021 31	Fatih Karagümrük	3–0	Kayserispor	Istanbul
16:00 TRT (UTC+3)		Report		Stadium: Atatürk Olympic Stadium; Attendance: 0 Referee: Bahattin Şimşek

3 April 2021 32	Kayserispor	1–1	Göztepe	Kayseri
13:30 TRT (UTC+3)		Report		Stadium: Kadir Has Stadium; Attendance: 0 Referee: Burak Seker

6 April 2021 33	Trabzonspor	1–1	Kayserispor	Trabzon
19:00 TRT (UTC+3)		Report		Stadium: Şenol Güneş Stadium; Attendance: 0 Referee: Atilla Karaoglan

11 April 2021 34	Kayserispor	0–1	Antalyaspor	Kayseri
16:00 TRT (UTC+3)		Report		Stadium: Kadir Has Stadium; Attendance: 0 Referee: Tugay Kaan Numanoglu

16 April 2021 35	Konyaspor	0–0	Kayserispor	Konya
16:00 TRT (UTC+3)		Report		Stadium: Konya Büyükşehir Stadium; Attendance: 0 Referee: Ali Şansalan

20 April 2021 36	Kayserispor	2–2	Gençlerbirliği	Kayseri
16:00 TRT (UTC+3)		Report		Stadium: Kadir Has Stadium; Attendance: 0 Referee: Alper Ulusoy

24 April 2021 37	Beşiktaş	3–1	Kayserispor	Istanbul
20:30 TRT (UTC+3)	Ghezzal 4' (pen.); Nkoudou 13', 65'; De Souza (yellow card) 32'; Rosier (yellow card) 37'; Uysal (yellow card) 50'; Montero (yellow card) 89'	Report	Pedro Henrique 6', (yellow card) 58'	Stadium: Vodafone Park; Attendance: 0 Referee: Cüneyt Çakır

28 April 2021 38	Kayserispor	6–3	Denizlispor	Kayseri
16:00 TRT (UTC+3)		Report		Stadium: Kadir Has Stadium

9 May 2021 40	Kayserispor	0–0	Gaziantep	Kayseri
TRT (UTC+3)				Stadium: Kadir Has Stadium

11 May 2021 41	İstanbul Başakşehir	0–0	Kayserispor	Istanbul
20:30 TRT (UTC+3)	Bolingoli (yellow card) 13'	Report	Subaşı (yellow card) 83'	Stadium: Başakşehir Fatih Terim Stadium; Attendance: 0 Referee: Yaşar Kemal Uğurlu

16 May 2021 42	Kayserispor	1–2	Fenerbahçe	Kayseri
TRT (UTC+3)		Report		Stadium: Kadir Has Stadium

=== Turkish Cup ===
4 November 2020 Third round	Kayserispor	5–0	Yomraspor	Kayseri
18:00 TRT (UTC+3)	Ackah 27'; Demir 31', 37'; Çapar 45+5'; Alibec 54'	Report		Stadium: Kadir Has Stadium; Attendance: 0 Referee: Emre Kargın

26 November 2020 Fourth round	Kayserispor	3–3 (a.e.t.) (3–4 p)	Hekimoğlu Trabzon	Kayseri
17:00 TRT (UTC+3)	Kvrzic 12', 83'; Kanga 85'	Report	Karadeniz 10', 25', 34' (pen.)	Stadium: Kadir Has Stadium; Attendance: 0 Referee: Yiğit Arslan
	Penalties
	Acar (penalty scored); Kvrzic (penalty scored); Kolovetsios (penalty scored); Kanga (penalty missed); Lopes (penalty missed)		(penalty scored) Eşer; (penalty scored) Erdem; (penalty scored) Odabaşı; (penalty scored) Kuru
