= List of Turkish football transfers winter 2023–24 =

This is a list of Turkish football transfers for the 2023–24 winter transfer window. Only transfers featuring Süper Lig are listed.

== Süper Lig ==
Note: Flags indicate national team as has been defined under FIFA eligibility rules. Players may hold more than one non-FIFA nationality.

=== Galatasaray ===
In:

No.	Pos.	Nation	Player
17	DF	GER	Derrick Köhn (from (Germany) Hannover 96)
92	DF	CIV	Serge Aurier (from (England) Nottingham Forest)
95	FW	BRA	Carlos Vinícius (on loan from (England) Fulham)

Out:

No.	Pos.	Nation	Player
3	DF	ESP	Angeliño (loan return to (Germany) RB Leipzig)
12	GK	TUR	Atakan Ordu (on loan to Kırıkkalegücü)
21	FW	TUR	Halil Dervişoğlu (on loan to Hatayspor)
88	DF	TUR	Kazımcan Karataş (on loan to Ankaragücü)
93	DF	FRA	Sacha Boey (to (Germany) Bayern Munich)
94	FW	COD	Cédric Bakambu (to (Spain) Real Betis)
—	DF	TUR	Işık Kaan Arslan (on loan to Vanspor, previously on loan at Fethiyespor)
—	MF	TUR	Baran Aksaka (on loan to Gençlerbirliği, previously on loan at Şanlıurfaspor)
—	DF	COD	Christian Luyindama (free agent)

=== Fenerbahçe ===
In:

No.	Pos.	Nation	Player
2	DF	TUR	Çağlar Söyüncü (on loan from (Spain) Atlético Madrid)
19	DF	ITA	Leonardo Bonucci (from (Germany) Union Berlin)
33	MF	BIH	Rade Krunić (on loan from (Italy) Milan)
91	FW	TUR	Serdar Dursun (on loan from Fatih Karagümrük)

Out:

No.	Pos.	Nation	Player
3	DF	TUR	Samet Akaydin (on loan to (Greece) Panathinaikos)
18	MF	BRA	Lincoln (on loan to (Brazil) Red Bull Bragantino)
22	FW	TUR	Umut Nayir (on loan to Pendikspor)
27	MF	POR	Miguel Crespo (on loan to (Spain) Rayo Vallecano)
28	MF	TUR	Bartuğ Elmaz (on loan to Sivasspor)
29	FW	TUR	Barış Sungur (to Darıca Gençlerbirliği)
99	FW	TUR	Emre Mor (on loan to Fatih Karagümrük)
—	FW	TUR	Tiago Çukur (on loan to Ümraniyespor, previously on loan at (Belgium) Beveren)

=== Beşiktaş ===
In:

No.	Pos.	Nation	Player
2	DF	NOR	Jonas Svensson (from Adana Demirspor)
17	DF	ENG	Joe Worrall (on loan from (England) Nottingham Forest)
23	MF	ALB	Ernest Muçi (from (Poland) Legia Warsaw)
28	MF	LBY	Al-Musrati (on loan from (Portugal) Braga)

Out:

No.	Pos.	Nation	Player
24	DF	FRA	Valentin Rosier (on loan to (France) Nice)
27	FW	TUR	Emirhan Delibaş (free agent)
30	DF	CIV	Eric Bailly (to (Spain) Villarreal)
71	MF	CMR	Jean Onana (on loan to (France) Marseille)
99	FW	TUR	Emrecan Bulut (on loan to Ümraniyespor)
—	DF	TUR	Ahmet Gülay (on loan to Alanya Kestelspor, previously on loan at Aliağa)
—	MF	TUR	Abdullah Aydın (on loan to Esenler Erokspor, previously on loan at Şanlıurfaspor)
—	MF	TUR	Kerem Atakan Kesgin (on loan to Sivasspor, previously on loan at Fatih Karagümrük)

=== Adana Demirspor ===
In:

No.	Pos.	Nation	Player
10	MF	FRA	Nabil Alioui (from (France) Le Havre)
11	FW	COL	Stiven Mendoza (from (Brazil) Santos)
13	DF	IRN	Milad Mohammadi (from (Greece) AEK Athens)
14	MF	ESP	José Rodríguez (from (Israel) Hapoel Tel Aviv)
17	FW	KAZ	Abat Aymbetov (from (Kazakhstan) Astana)
31	DF	ALG	Youcef Atal (from (France) Nice)
58	MF	ANG	Maestro (from (Portugal) Benfica B)
77	FW	TUN	Motez Nourani (from (Tunisia) Tataouine)
93	FW	FRA	Breyton Fougeu (from (France) Lyon B)
—	MF	TUR	Aksel Aktaş (free agent)

Out:

No.	Pos.	Nation	Player
3	DF	TUR	Abdurrahim Dursun (to Ankaragücü)
9	FW	SEN	M'Baye Niang (to (Italy) Empoli)
10	MF	MAR	Younès Belhanda (to (Qatar) Al-Shamal)
11	FW	NGA	Babajide David (to Çaykur Rizespor)
17	MF	SEN	Badou Ndiaye (to Pendikspor)
22	DF	NOR	Jonas Svensson (to Beşiktaş)
23	FW	KOS	Arbër Zeneli (free agent)
25	GK	TUR	Ertaç Özbir (to Ankaragücü)
29	FW	ALB	Florent Shehu (on loan to (Croatia) Zrinski Osječko)
77	DF	POR	Kévin Rodrigues (to (Saudi Arabia) Al Qadsiah)
90	MF	FRA	Benjamin Stambouli (to (France) Reims)
94	FW	BIH	Hamza Jaganjac (on loan to (Croatia) Istra 1961)
—	MF	TUR	Aksel Aktaş (on loan to Tuzlaspor)
—	MF	TUR	Bünyamin Balat (on loan to Adana 1954, previously on loan at Diyarbekirspor)

=== İstanbul Başakşehir ===
In:

No.	Pos.	Nation	Player
11	FW	BRA	Davidson (from (China) Wuhan Three Towns)
20	MF	CMR	Olivier Kemen (from Kayserispor)
89	MF	BRA	Josef de Souza (from (China) Beijing Guoan)

Out:

No.	Pos.	Nation	Player
29	FW	TUR	Efecan Barlık (on loan to Kırklarelispor)
32	DF	GNB	Edgar Ié (free agent)
88	DF	TUR	Cemali Sertel (on loan to Hatayspor)
90	MF	ISR	Eden Kartsev (on loan to (Israel) Maccabi Tel Aviv)
99	FW	NGA	Emmanuel Dennis (loan return to (England) Nottingham Forest)
—	DF	TUR	Bedirhan Özyurt (on loan to Kırklarelispor, previously on loan at 68 Aksarayspor)
—	FW	TUR	Muhammet Arslantaş (on loan to Kastamonuspor, previously on loan at Şanlıurfaspor)
—	FW	GUI	Alya Touré (to (Georgia (country)) Dila Gori, previously on loan at (Guinea) Horoya)

=== Trabzonspor ===
In:

No.	Pos.	Nation	Player
12	DF	BEL	Thomas Meunier (from (Germany) Borussia Dortmund)

Out:

No.	Pos.	Nation	Player
10	MF	TUR	Abdülkadir Ömür (to (England) Hull City)
11	MF	GRE	Anastasios Bakasetas (to (Greece) Panathinaikos)
19	DF	DEN	Jens Stryger Larsen (to (Sweden) Malmö)
21	MF	GRE	Dimitrios Kourbelis (on loan to Fatih Karagümrük)
91	MF	CRO	Tonio Teklić (on loan to Fatih Karagümrük)
—	MF	TUR	Süleyman Cebeci (on loan to 68 Aksarayspor)
—	GK	TUR	Arda Akbulut (on loan to 1461 Trabzon, previously on loan at Adanaspor)
—	MF	TUR	Ali Alperen Çelik (on loan to Pazarspor, previously on loan at Sebat Gençlikspor)
—	FW	TUR	Behlül Aydın (to Kastamonuspor, previously on loan at 1461 Trabzon)

=== Fatih Karagümrük ===
In:

No.	Pos.	Nation	Player
11	FW	TUR	Emre Mor (on loan from Fenerbahçe)
21	MF	GRE	Dimitrios Kourbelis (on loan from Trabzonspor)
25	DF	GER	Koray Günter (on loan from (Italy) Hellas Verona)
31	GK	ITA	Salvatore Sirigu (from (France) Nice)
70	FW	BRA	Marcão (on loan from (Saudi Arabia) Al-Ahli, previously on loan at (China) Wuhan Three Towns)
91	MF	ITA	Andrea Bertolacci (on loan from (Italy) Cremonese)
99	MF	CRO	Tonio Teklić (on loan from Trabzonspor)

Out:

No.	Pos.	Nation	Player
1	GK	ARG	Matías Dituro (to (Spain) Elche)
5	DF	KOS	Ibrahim Drešević (to (Japan) Machida Zelvia)
11	FW	NED	Brahim Darri (free agent)
16	MF	TUR	Kerem Atakan Kesgin (loan return to Beşiktaş)
17	MF	TUR	Samed Onur (to Sakaryaspor)
19	FW	TUR	Serdar Dursun (on loan to Fenerbahçe)
27	MF	ITA	Stefano Sturaro (to (Italy) Catania)
29	MF	UZB	Otabek Shukurov (to Kayserispor)
—	GK	TUR	Cem Kablan (to 1461 Trabzon)
—	DF	TUR	Emir Yazıcı (on loan to Bergama Belediyespor, previously on loan at Serik Belediyespor)
—	MF	TUR	Egemen Pehlivan (on loan to Sapanca Gençlikspor, previously on loan at Diyarbekirspor)

=== Konyaspor ===
In:

No.	Pos.	Nation	Player
7	MF	CIV	Anderson Niangbo (free agent)
15	DF	ZIM	Teenage Hadebe (from (United States) Houston Dynamo)
18	FW	SEN	Alassane Ndao (from İstanbulspor)
25	FW	SEN	Bouly Sambou (from (Morocco) Wydad Casablanca)
26	MF	GHA	Emmanuel Boateng (from (Sweden) Elfsborg)
27	GK	POL	Jakub Słowik (from (Japan) FC Tokyo)
33	DF	SRB	Filip Damjanović (from (Serbia) Voždovac)
72	FW	MKD	Valon Ethemi (on loan from İstanbulspor)

Out:

No.	Pos.	Nation	Player
7	FW	CRO	Robert Murić (to (Croatia) Slaven Belupo)
15	DF	CRC	Francisco Calvo (to (Mexico) Juárez)
16	FW	POR	Nélson Oliveira (to (Portugal) Vitória Guimarães)
27	FW	TUR	Ata Berk Karababa (on loan to Karaman)
61	GK	FRA	Paul Bernardoni (to (Switzerland) Yverdon-Sport)
90	FW	TUR	Emrehan Gedikli (on loan to İstanbulspor)
—	MF	TUR	Hüseyin Mert Uyanıker (on loan to 1922 Konyaspor, previously on loan at Siirt İl Özel İdaresi)

=== Kayserispor ===
In:

No.	Pos.	Nation	Player
9	FW	HAI	Duckens Nazon (from (Bulgaria) CSKA Sofia)
10	MF	MAR	Mehdi Bourabia (from (Italy) Frosinone)
29	MF	UZB	Otabek Shukurov (from Fatih Karagümrük)

Out:

No.	Pos.	Nation	Player
9	FW	SEN	Mame Thiam (to Pendikspor)
10	MF	CMR	Olivier Kemen (to İstanbul Başakşehir)
19	DF	TUR	Ahmet Kağan Malatyalı (on loan to Yeni Mersin İdmanyurdu)
22	FW	TUR	Hayrullah Erkip (on loan to Düzcespor)
—	FW	TUR	Ethem Balcı (on loan to Talasgücü Belediyespor, previously on loan at İnegölspor)
—	FW	TUR	Nurettin Korkmaz (on loan to İskenderunspor, previously on loan at İnegölspor)

=== Kasımpaşa ===
In:

No.	Pos.	Nation	Player
8	MF	CIV	Trazié Thomas (on loan from (Israel) Beitar Jerusalem)
14	FW	TUR	Oğulcan Çağlayan (from Gaziantep)
15	FW	POR	Rochinha (from (Portugal) Sporting CP)
16	MF	TUR	Emre Gedik (on loan from Göztepe)
23	DF	ECU	Jackson Porozo (on loan from (France) Troyes, previously on loan at (Greece) Olympiacos)

Out:

No.	Pos.	Nation	Player
3	DF	TUR	Duhan Aksu (to Kocaelispor)
80	MF	TUR	Hasan Emre Yeşilyurt (to Sariyer)
97	FW	FRA	Iron Gomis (on loan to (Italy) Salernitana)
98	GK	TUR	Murat Can Yıldız (to Alanya Kestelspor)
—	GK	TUR	Ramazan Özkanlı (on loan to Amasyaspor, previously on loan at Ayvalıkgücü Belediyespor)
—	FW	MKD	Berat Kalkan (on loan to (North Macedonia) Gostivar, previously on loan at Karşıyaka)
—	DF	TUR	Furkan Yaşa (to Artvin Hopaspor, previously on loan at Osmaniyespor)

=== Ankaragücü ===
In:

No.	Pos.	Nation	Player
13	FW	CMR	Christian Bassogog (from (China) Shanghai Shenhua)
17	MF	ITA	Riccardo Saponara (from (Italy) Hellas Verona)
19	MF	FRA	Alexis Flips (on loan from (Belgium) Anderlecht)
25	GK	TUR	Ertaç Özbir (from Adana Demirspor)
33	DF	TUR	Abdurrahim Dursun (from Adana Demirspor)
35	DF	TUR	Kazımcan Karataş (on loan from Galatasaray)

Out:

No.	Pos.	Nation	Player
1	GK	POL	Rafał Gikiewicz (to (Poland) Widzew Łódź)
2	DF	TUR	Alperen Kuyubaşı (on loan to Iğdır)
16	MF	BIH	Andrej Đokanović (on loan to Manisa)
25	DF	FRA	Enock Kwateng (free agent)
41	GK	TUR	Doğukan Kaya (on loan to Muş 1984 Muşspor)
44	MF	TUR	Berkay Ateşyakan (free agent)
—	MF	SEN	Lamine Diack (to (France) Nantes, previously on loan)
—	FW	TUR	Mervan Yiğit (on loan to Muş 1984 Muşspor, previously on loan at Bandırmaspor)

=== İstanbulspor ===
In:

No.	Pos.	Nation	Player
9	FW	TUR	Emrehan Gedikli (on loan from Konyaspor)

Out:

No.	Pos.	Nation	Player
18	FW	SEN	Alassane Ndao (to Konyaspor)
27	FW	MKD	Valon Ethemi (on loan to Konyaspor)

=== Antalyaspor ===
In:

No.	Pos.	Nation	Player

Out:

No.	Pos.	Nation	Player

=== Sivasspor ===
In:

No.	Pos.	Nation	Player
20	MF	TUR	Kerem Atakan Kesgin (on loan from Beşiktaş, previously on loan at Fatih Karagümrük)
33	MF	TUR	Bartuğ Elmaz (on loan from Fenerbahçe)

Out:

No.	Pos.	Nation	Player

=== Alanyaspor ===
In:

No.	Pos.	Nation	Player

Out:

No.	Pos.	Nation	Player

=== Gaziantep ===
In:

No.	Pos.	Nation	Player

Out:

No.	Pos.	Nation	Player
23	FW	TUR	Oğulcan Çağlayan (to Kasımpaşa)

=== Hatayspor ===
In:

No.	Pos.	Nation	Player
11	FW	TUR	Halil Dervişoğlu (on loan from Galatasaray)
88	DF	TUR	Cemali Sertel (on loan from İstanbul Başakşehir)

Out:

No.	Pos.	Nation	Player

=== Samsunspor ===
In:

No.	Pos.	Nation	Player

Out:

No.	Pos.	Nation	Player

=== Çaykur Rizespor ===
In:

No.	Pos.	Nation	Player
28	FW	NGA	Babajide David (from Adana Demirspor)

Out:

No.	Pos.	Nation	Player

=== Pendikspor ===
In:

No.	Pos.	Nation	Player
5	MF	SEN	Badou Ndiaye (from Adana Demirspor)
17	FW	TUR	Umut Nayir (on loan from Fenerbahçe)
27	FW	SEN	Mame Thiam (from Kayserispor)

Out:

No.	Pos.	Nation	Player

== See also ==
- 2023–24 Süper Lig
