= Ackah =

Ackah is a surname. Notable people with the surname include:

- Bernard Ackah (born 1972), Ivorian mixed martial artist and comedian
- Jewel Ackah (c. 1945–2018), Ghanaian musician
- Lovelace Ackah (born 1976), Ghanaian footballer
- Yaw Ackah (born 1999), Ghanaian footballer
