= Uzodimma =

Uzodimma is a surname. Notable people with the surname include:

- Anthony Uzodimma (born 1999), Nigerian footballer
- Hope Uzodimma (born 1958), Nigerian politician
