= Gökhan Sazdağı =

Turkish footballer

Personal information
- Date of birth: 20 September 1994 (age 32)
- Place of birth: Üsküdar, Turkey
- Height: 1.79 m (5 ft 10 in)
- Positions: Midfielder; right-back

Team information
- Current team: Çorum
- Number: 11

Youth career
- 2006–2010: Selimiyespor
- 2010–2013: Fenerbahçe

Senior career*
Years	Team	Apps	(Gls)
2013–2015	Fenerbahçe	0	(0)
2013–2014	→ Turgutluspor (loan)	33	(7)
2014–2015	→ Manisaspor (loan)	27	(3)
2015–2017	Gaziantep	45	(5)
2017	→ Manisaspor (loan)	15	(2)
2017	Fatih Karagümrük	9	(2)
2018	Hatayspor	5	(1)
2018–2019	Adanaspor	29	(2)
2019–2021	Boluspor	47	(12)
2021–2025	Kayserispor	122	(4)
2025–2026	Beşiktaş	17	(0)
2026–	Çorum	8	(0)

International career^{‡}
2013	Turkey U19	7	(2)
2014–2015	Turkey U21	2	(0)
- * Club domestic league appearances and goals as of 16 October 2026 ‡ National team caps and goals as of 27 March 2015

Gökhan Sazdağı (born 20 September 1994) is a Turkish professional footballer who plays as a midfielder for the Turkish Süper Lig club Çorum.

== Professional career ==
A youth product of Selimiyespor and Fenerbahçe, Sazdağı signed his first professional contract with Fenerbahçe on 8 July 2013. He spent his early career on loan with Turgutluspor and Manisaspor He then moved to Gaziantep, and had stints with the semi-pro clubs Fatih Karagümrük, Hatayspor, and Boluspor.

On 26 June 2021, he transferred to Kayserispor in the Turkish Süper Lig. He made his professional debut with Kayserispor in a 3–0 Süper Lig to Altay on 14 August 2021.

On 10 September 2025, Sazdağı joined Beşiktaş on a permanent two-year deal with an option for another year.

== Career statistics ==
As of 21 January 2026

Appearances and goals by club, season and competition
Club	Season	League			National Cup		Other		Total	
Club	Season	Division	Apps	Goals	Apps	Goals	Apps	Goals	Apps	Goals
Turgutluspor (loan)	2013–14	2. Lig	33	7	2	0	—		35	7
Manisaspor (loan)	2014–15	1. Lig	27	3	6	2	—		33	5
Gaziantep	2015–16	1. Lig	33	5	0	0	—		33	5
Gaziantep	2016–17	1. Lig	12	0	1	0	—		12	0
Gaziantep	Total		45	5	1	0	—		45	5
Manisaspor (loan)	2016–17	1. Lig	15	2	—		—		15	2
Fatih Karagümrük	2017–18	2. Lig	9	2	0	0	—		9	2
Hatayspor	2017–18	2. Lig	5	1	—		—		5	1
Adanaspor	2018–19	1. Lig	29	2	1	0	—		30	2
Boluspor	2019–20	1. Lig	21	7	0	0	—		21	7
Boluspor	2020–21	1. Lig	26	5	1	1	—		27	6
Boluspor	Total		47	12	1	1	—		48	13
Kayserispor	2021–22	Süper Lig	24	2	4	2	—		28	4
Kayserispor	2022–23	Süper Lig	31	1	5	1	—		36	2
Kayserispor	2023–24	Süper Lig	34	0	2	0	—		36	0
Kayserispor	2024–25	Süper Lig	30	0	0	0	—		30	0
Kayserispor	2025–26	Süper Lig	3	0	0	0	—		3	0
Kayserispor	Total		122	3	11	3	—		133	6
Beşiktaş	2025–26	Süper Lig	13	0	1	0	—		14	0
Career total			345	37	23	6	—		368	43
