= Majid Hosseini =

Iranian footballer (born 1996)

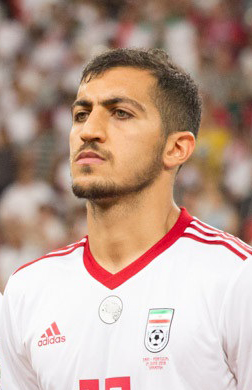
- Hosseini playing for Iran at the 2018 FIFA World Cup

Personal information
- Full name: Seyed Majid Hosseini
- Date of birth: 20 June 1996 (age 30)
- Place of birth: Tehran, Iran
- Height: 1.85 m (6 ft 1 in)
- Position: Centre-back

Youth career
- 2009–2014: Saipa
- 2014–2015: Esteghlal
- 2015: Rah Ahan (loan)

Senior career*
Years	Team	Apps	(Gls)
2014–2018	Esteghlal	43	(1)
2015–2016	→ Rah Ahan (loan)	9	(1)
2018–2021	Trabzonspor	59	(1)
2021–2026	Kayserispor	80	(2)

International career^{‡}
2012–2013	Iran U17	26	(6)
2014–2015	Iran U20	8	(0)
2015–2017	Iran U23	3	(0)
2018–	Iran	30	(0)
Medal record
Representing Iran
CAFA Nations Cup
Winner	2023 Kyrgyzstan – Uzbekistan	Team
- * Club domestic league appearances and goals as of 9 November 2025 ‡ National team caps and goals as of 18 November 2025

Seyed Majid Hosseini (Persian: سید مجید حسینی; born 20 June 1996) is an Iranian professional footballer who plays as a defender.

Hosseini made his full international debut in 2018 and represented Iran at the 2018 FIFA World Cup, 2019 AFC Asian Cup and 2022 FIFA World Cup.

== Club career ==
=== Esteghlal ===
Hosseini joined the first team of Esteghlal in 2014 and made his first appearance for the club on 17 April 2015 as an 18-year-old. He spent a year on loan at Rah Ahan, before returning to Esteghlal and earning a spot in the first eleven. Hosseini was named to the Persian Gulf Pro League team of the season for 2017–18.

=== Trabzonspor ===
On 30 July 2018, Hosseini officially Süper Lig side Trabzonspor on a three-year contract joining his compatriot Vahid Amiri. He was given the number 5 shirt, the same number he wore in Esteghlal the previous season.

=== Kayserispor ===
On 28 July 2021, Hosseini signed for Süper Lig side Kayserispor.

== International career ==
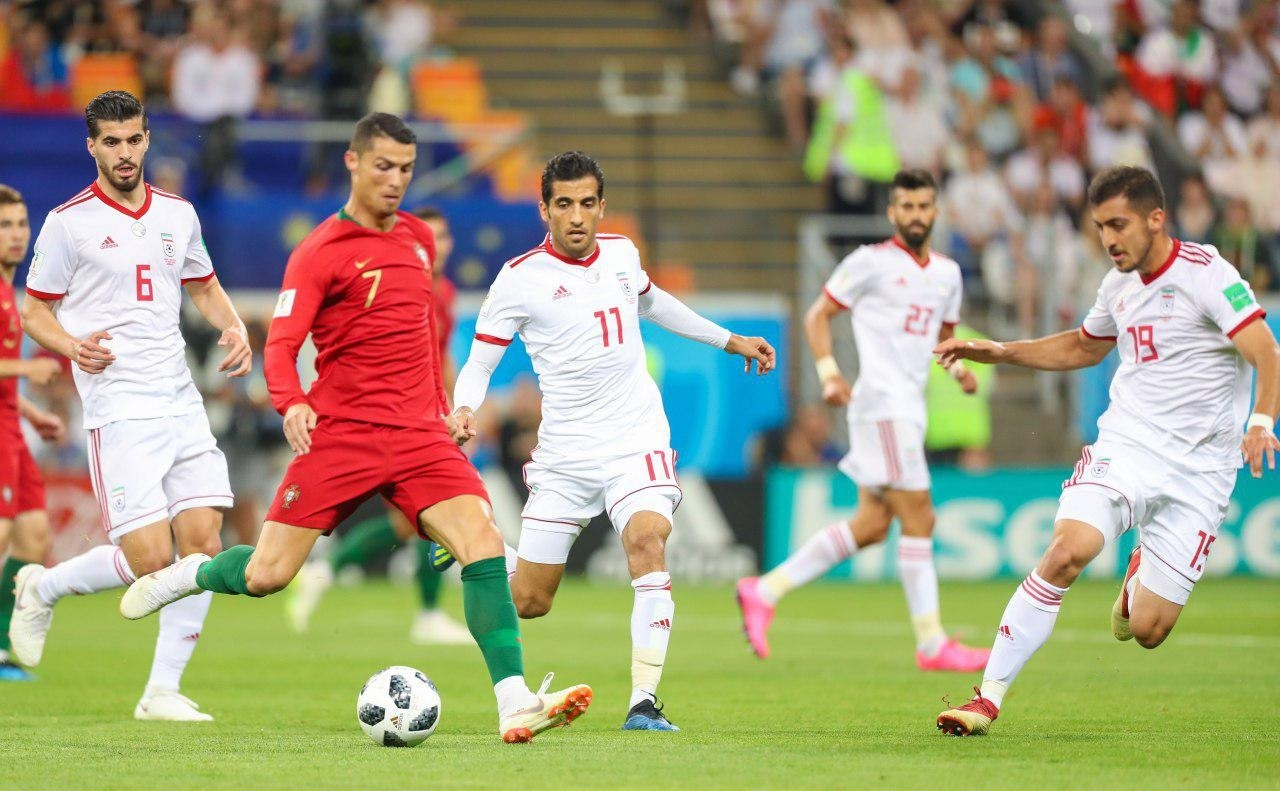
Hosseini defending against Cristiano Ronaldo in the 2018 FIFA World Cup.

Hosseini made his international debut against Uzbekistan on 19 May 2018. In June 2018, he was named in Iran's squad for the 2018 World Cup in Russia. After teammate Rouzbeh Cheshmi was injured in training, Hosseini started as centre back in Iran's two remaining group stage matches, playing every minute in the team's 0–1 loss to Spain and 1–1 draw with Portugal. While playing against England in the 2022 FIFA World Cup, Hosseini collided with teammate Alireza Beiranvand breaking Beiranvand's nose. England won the game 6–2.

== Personal life ==
During the Mahsa Amini protests, Hosseini supported fellow footballer Amir Reza Nasr Azadani, who was jailed as a result of the protests, by posting a picture of the latter with calls for the authorities to not execute Azadani. On 13 January 2026, Hosseini publicly supported the 2025–2026 Iranian protests and criticized the Iranian government's internet blackout in response by stating: "This is the usual pattern of the Islamic Republic regime before a massacre."

== Career statistics ==
=== Club ===
As of match played 9 November 2025

Club	Season	League			National cup (Note: Includes Iranian Hazfi Cup, Turkish Cup)		Continental		Other		Total	
Club	Season	Division	Apps	Goals	Apps	Goals	Apps	Goals	Apps	Goals	Apps	Goals
Esteghlal	2014–15	Persian Gulf Pro League	4	0	0	0	—		—		4	0
Esteghlal	2015–16	Persian Gulf Pro League	1	0	0	0	—		—		1	0
Esteghlal	2016–17	Persian Gulf Pro League	16	1	2	0	3 (Note: Appearances in AFC Champions League)	0	—		21	1
Esteghlal	2017–18	Persian Gulf Pro League	22	0	4	1	5	0	—		31	1
Esteghlal	Total		52	2	6	1	8	0	—		66	3
Rah Ahan (loan)	2015–16	Persian Gulf Pro League	9	1	0	0	—		—		9	1
Trabzonspor	2018–19	Süper Lig	25	0	4	1	—		—		29	1
Trabzonspor	2019–20	Süper Lig	16	1	4	0	8 (Note: Appearances in UEFA Europa League)	0	—		28	1
Trabzonspor	2020–21	Süper Lig	18	0	0	0	—		1 (Note: Appearance in Turkish Super Cup)	0	19	0
Trabzonspor	Total		59	1	8	1	8	0	1	0	76	2
Kayserispor	2021–22	Süper Lig	28	0	7	3	—		—		35	3
Kayserispor	2022–23	Süper Lig	25	2	3	1	—		—		28	3
Kayserispor	2023–24	Süper Lig	10	0	0	0	—		—		10	0
Kayserispor	2024–25	Süper Lig	14	0	0	0	—		—		14	0
Kayserispor	2025–26	Süper Lig	3	0	0	0	—		—		3	0
Kayserispor	Total		80	2	10	4	—		—		90	6
Career total			191	5	24	6	16	0	1	0	232	11

=== International ===
As of 18 November 2025

Iran
Year	Apps	Goals
2018	7	0
2019	6	0
2021	1	0
2022	7	0
2023	3	0
2024	4	0
2025	2	0
Total	30	0

== Honours ==
Esteghlal

- Hazfi Cup: 2017–18

Trabzonspor

- Turkish Cup: 2019–20
- Turkish Super Cup: 2020

Individual

- Persian Gulf Pro League Team of the Year: 2017–18
