= Mario Gavranović =

Swiss football player (born 1989)

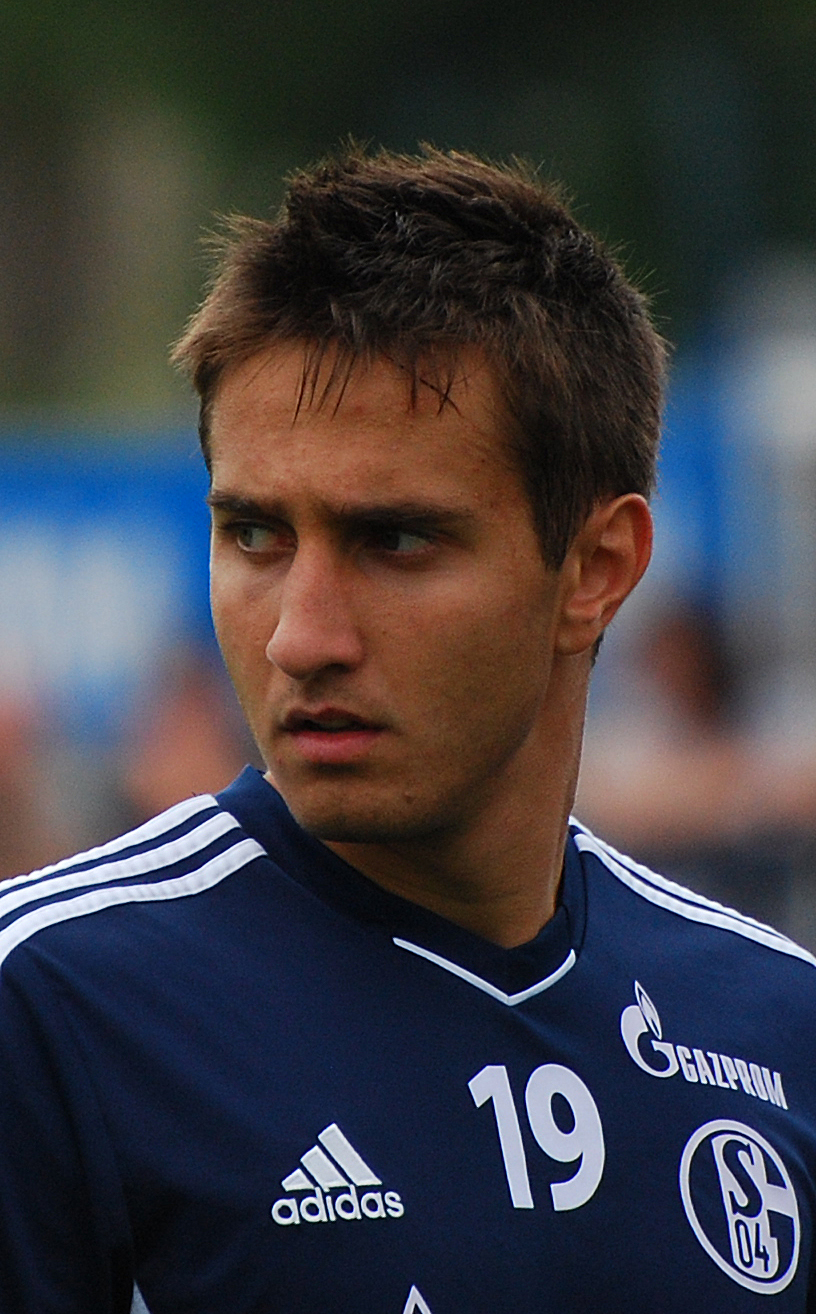
- Gavranović with Schalke 04 in 2011

Personal information
- Full name: Mario Gavranović
- Date of birth: 24 November 1989 (age 36)
- Place of birth: Lugano, Switzerland
- Height: 1.75 m (5 ft 9 in)
- Position: Forward

Youth career
- 1996–2000: AS Vezia
- 2000–2006: Team Ticino

Senior career*
Years	Team	Apps	(Gls)
2006–2008	Lugano	21	(8)
2008–2010	Yverdon-Sport	20	(8)
2009–2010	→ Neuchâtel Xamax (loan)	17	(8)
2010–2012	Schalke 04	10	(0)
2010–2011	→ Schalke 04 II	5	(2)
2011–2012	→ Mainz 05 (loan)	5	(0)
2012–2016	Zürich	90	(26)
2016–2018	Rijeka	59	(25)
2018–2021	Dinamo Zagreb	88	(39)
2021–2023	Kayserispor	48	(15)
2024	FC Mendrisio	3	(0)
Total		366	(131)

International career
2005	Switzerland U17	1	(2)
2007–2008	Switzerland U19	8	(6)
2008–2011	Switzerland U21	14	(3)
2011–2022	Switzerland	41	(16)
Medal record
Men's football
Representing Switzerland
UEFA European Under-21 Championship
Runner-up	2011
- * Club domestic league appearances and goals

Mario Gavranović (Croatian pronunciation: [mâːrio ɡaʋrǎːnoʋitɕ]; born 24 November 1989) is a Swiss former professional footballer who played as a forward.

== Club career ==
=== Early career ===
Gavranović began his career with AS Vezia, before he was scouted by Team Ticino U18, the youth academy of FC Lugano. In the 2006–07 season, he played his first professional games in the Swiss Challenge League for FC Lugano. In his second season he scored eight goals in 21 games. In the summer of 2008 he signed for Yverdon-Sport and scored another eight goals in only 20 games. For the 2008–09 season, he moved to Neuchâtel Xamax.

=== Schalke ===
After a successful start at Neuchâtel Xamax having scored eight goals in 17 games, Gavranović left his team to sign for Schalke 04 on 1 February 2010. He scored a vital goal for Schalke 04 in the Round of 16 in the Champions League against Valencia, which led his team to a 4–2 victory and a place in the quarter-finals. Gavranović joined fellow Bundesliga side Mainz on a season-long loan deal on 31 August 2011. Mainz reportedly paid €200,000 to secure his services and the loan included a deal for a permanent transfer worth €1.5 million.

=== FC Zürich ===
After only making five appearances during his loan spell, Gavranović returned to Schalke at which point he agreed to cancel his contract in May 2012 and moved on a free transfer to FC Zürich in the summer. He made his debut for Zürich on 15 July 2012, and scored his first goal from the penalty spot in the same match, a 1–1 draw with FC Luzern.

Gavranović scored Zürich's winning goal against reigning champions FC Basel on 11 August 2013 in the fifth round of the Swiss Super League. He scored Zürich's first goal as the club twice came from behind to defeat FC Stade Lausanne Ouchy 3-2 in the second round of the Swiss Cup on 15 September. On 24 November, Gavranović netted twice in the second half of Zürich's Super League clash with FC Sion, inspiring his side to a 4–1 victory.

In the Zürich Derby match against Grasshoppers on 1 March 2014, Gavranović scored a goal in either half to give Zürich a 3-1 win. On 21 April 2014, Gavranović scored twice in extra-time to lead Zürich to a 2–0 victory over Basel in the final of the Swiss Cup.

After suffering a knee injury in training at the World Cup, Gavranović was sidelined for the rest of 2014.

=== Rijeka ===
On 18 January 2016, Gavranović moved to HNK Rijeka in Croatia. He signed a 2 1/2-year contract with the club and joined their pre-season training camp in Dubai. Gavranović scored on his official club début on 12 February 2016, converting a cross by Roman Bezjak in the 25th minute to double Rijeka's lead against Lokomotiva. In two years with the club Gavranović scored 40 goals in 80 appearances.

=== Dinamo Zagreb ===
On 5 January 2018, Gavranović joined Dinamo Zagreb as part of player exchange deal involving Domagoj Pavičić and Luka Capan. He signed a three-year contract with the club and selected the number 11 jersey. With a move to the new club and a successful spring season, Gavranović was determined to secure a place in Switzerland's squad for the 2018 FIFA World Cup in Russia. During his official presentation in Zagreb Gavranović revealed that all of his family members are Dinamo supporters and since the early age he was also encouraged to support the club.

He scored his first goal for the club in a 1–0 win over Slaven Belupo on 4 March. On 7 March, he scored against his former club Rijeka, but Dinamo would go on to lose the match 4–1. He scored again in a 2–0 win over Rudeš on 17 March and then scored against Istra 1961 in a 4–0 away win on 8 April. Gavranović scored twice in a 2–1 away win over rivals Hajduk Split, which moved Dinamo closer to securing a 19th league title.

He was released from Dinamo at the end of his contract on 30 July 2020. However, he returned to the club just three weeks later due to injury of club's first striker Bruno Petković. On 17 October, he scored his first hat-trick for Dinamo as they defeated Gorica 3–2.

== International career ==
Gavranović represented Switzerland on U-21 level in 14 games and scored three goals. On 26 March 2011, he made senior team debut in the 0–0 draw with Bulgaria in a Euro 2012 qualifier. His first goals arrived in a brace scored in a 4–2 friendly win over Croatia on 15 August 2012. Gavranović was named in the final 23-man squad for the World Cup in Brazil on 13 May 2014. On 29 June, he sustained a serious knee injury in training, ruling him out for the rest of the World Cup and until early 2015. Gavranović was named in manager Vladimir Petković's 23-man Swiss squad for the 2018 FIFA World Cup in Russia. He played his first ever World Cup match in the second Group E match versus Serbia, entering at the start of the second half and giving an injury time assist which was finished by Xherdan Shaqiri for a 2–1 comeback win. Gavranović was named in Petković's 26-man squad for the UEFA Euro 2020. On 28 June 2021, he was substituted for Shaqiri in the 73rd minute of the Round of 16 match against France. He scored Switzerland's third goal, tying the score at 3–3. After extra time and a penalty shoot-out, Switzerland won 5–4 (with Gavranović successfully converting his penalty) and qualified for the quarter-finals. That was the first time since the 1938 FIFA World Cup that Switzerland progressed past a knockout round of a major tournament, and the first time since the 1954 FIFA World Cup that they progressed to the quarter-finals of a major tournament.

On 15 September 2022, Gavranović announced his retirement from the Swiss national team, after eleven years and 41 appearances in the senior team. His last appearance was thus on 5 June 2022, in a 0–4 defeat to Portugal in the UEFA Nations League.

== Personal life ==
Gavranović was born in Lugano to Bosnian Croat parents, hailing from Gradačac in Bosnia and Herzegovina. As of 2016, Gavranović is married to Anita, a Bosnian Croat from Derventa. In May 2019, Anita gave birth to a baby girl whom they named Leonie.

== Career statistics ==
=== Club ===
Appearances and goals by club, season and competition
Club	Season	League			National cup (Note: Includes Swiss Cup, DFB-Pokal, Croatian Football Cup, Turkish Cup)		Europe		Other		Total	
Club	Season	Division	Apps	Goals	Apps	Goals	Apps	Goals	Apps	Goals	Apps	Goals
Lugano	2006–07	Swiss Challenge League	2	0	—		—		—		2	0
Lugano	2007–08	Swiss Challenge League	21	8	1	0	—		—		22	8
Lugano	Total		23	8	1	0	—		—		24	8
Yverdon Sport	2008–09	Swiss Challenge League	20	8	2	0	—		—		22	8
Neuchâtel Xamax	2009–10	Swiss Super League	17	8	3	2	—		—		20	10
Schalke 04	2009–10	Bundesliga	2	0	—		—		—		2	0
Schalke 04	2010–11	Bundesliga	8	0	1	1	1 (Note: Appearance(s) in UEFA Champions League)	1	—		10	2
Schalke 04	2011–12	Bundesliga	—		1	2	1 (Note: Appearance(s) in UEFA Europa League)	0	—		2	2
Schalke 04	Total		10	0	2	3	2	1	—		14	4
Mainz 05	2011–12	Bundesliga	5	0	1	0	—		—		6	0
Zürich	2012–13	Swiss Super League	32	9	4	6	—		—		36	15
Zürich	2013–14	Swiss Super League	31	13	6	4	2	0	—		39	17
Zürich	2014–15	Swiss Super League	11	1	2	0	—		—		13	1
Zürich	2015–16	Swiss Super League	16	3	4	1	2	0	—		22	4
Zürich	Total		90	26	16	11	4	0	—		110	37
Rijeka	2015–16	Prva HNL	13	7	2	0	—		—		15	7
Rijeka	2016–17	Prva HNL	29	11	5	7	2	0	—		36	18
Rijeka	2017–18	Prva HNL	17	7	2	2	10 (Note: Six appearances and three goals in UEFA Champions League, four appearances and three goals in UEFA Europa League)	6	—		29	15
Rijeka	Total		59	25	9	9	12	6	—		80	40
Dinamo Zagreb	2017–18	Prva HNL	15	8	2	1	—		—		17	9
Dinamo Zagreb	2018–19	Prva HNL	24	9	3	1	13 (Note: Five appearances and one goal in UEFA Champions League, eight appearances and one goal in UEFA Europa League)	2	—		40	12
Dinamo Zagreb	2019–20	Prva HNL	19	4	3	3	8	0	1 (Note: Appearance in Croatian Football Super Cup)	0	31	7
Dinamo Zagreb	2020–21	Prva HNL	27	17	3	1	10 (Note: Two appearances in UEFA Champions League, eight appearances and one goal in UEFA Europa League)	1	—		40	19
Dinamo Zagreb	2021–22	Prva HNL	3	1	0	0	2	0	—		5	1
Dinamo Zagreb	Total		88	39	11	6	33	3	1	0	133	48
Kayserispor	2021–22	Süper Lig	26	10	4	2	—		—		30	12
Kayserispor	2022–23	Süper Lig	22	5	3	0	—		—		25	5
Career total			350	129	52	33	51	10	1	0	461	172

=== International ===
Appearances and goals by national team and year
National team	Year	Apps	Goals
Switzerland	2011	2	0
Switzerland	2012	3	4
Switzerland	2013	4	0
Switzerland	2014	2	0
Switzerland	2015	0	0
Switzerland	2016	0	0
Switzerland	2017	0	0
Switzerland	2018	9	2
Switzerland	2019	2	1
Switzerland	2020	4	3
Switzerland	2021	11	6
Switzerland	2022	4	0
Total		41	16

Scores and results list Switzerland's goal tally first, score column indicates score after each Gavranović goal.

List of international goals scored by Mario Gavranović
No.	Date	Venue	Cap	Opponent	Score	Result	Competition
1	15 August 2012	Stadion Poljud, Split, Croatia	3	Croatia	3–1	4–2	Friendly
2	15 August 2012	Stadion Poljud, Split, Croatia	3	Croatia	4–2	4–2	Friendly
3	12 October 2012	Stade de Suisse, Wankdorf, Bern, Switzerland	4	Norway	1–0	1–1	2014 FIFA World Cup qualification
4	16 October 2012	Laugardalsvöllur, Reykjavík, Iceland	5	Iceland	2–0	2–0	2014 FIFA World Cup qualification
5	27 March 2018	Swissporarena, Luzern, Switzerland	13	Panama	5–0	6–0	Friendly
6	12 October 2018	King Baudouin Stadium, Brussels, Belgium	18	Belgium	1–1	1–2	2018–19 UEFA Nations League A
7	8 September 2019	Stade Tourbillon, Sion, Switzerland	22	Gibraltar	4–0	4–0	UEFA Euro 2020 qualifying
8	7 October 2020	Kybunpark, St. Gallen, Switzerland	23	Croatia	1–0	1–2	Friendly
9	13 October 2020	RheinEnergieStadion, Cologne, Germany	25	Germany	1–0	3–3	2020–21 UEFA Nations League A
10	13 October 2020	RheinEnergieStadion, Cologne, Germany	25	Germany	3–2	3–3	2020–21 UEFA Nations League A
11	31 March 2021	Kybunpark, St. Gallen, Switzerland	29	Finland	1–0	3–2	Friendly
12	3 June 2021	Kybunpark, St. Gallen, Switzerland	30	Liechtenstein	1–0	7–0	Friendly
13	3 June 2021	Kybunpark, St. Gallen, Switzerland	30	Liechtenstein	5–0	7–0	Friendly
14	3 June 2021	Kybunpark, St. Gallen, Switzerland	30	Liechtenstein	6–0	7–0	Friendly
15	28 June 2021	Arena Națională, Bucharest, Romania	34	France	3–3	3–3 (a.e.t.)	UEFA Euro 2020
16	12 October 2021	LFF Stadium, Vilnius, Lithuania	36	Lithuania	4–0	4–0	2022 FIFA World Cup qualification

== Honours ==
Schalke 04

- DFB-Pokal: 2010–11

Zürich

- Swiss Cup: 2013–14, 2015–16

Rijeka

- Prva HNL: 2016–17
- Croatian Cup: 2016–17

Dinamo Zagreb

- Prva HNL: 2017–18, 2018–19, 2019–20, 2020–21
- Croatian Cup: 2017–18, 2020–21
- Croatian Super Cup: 2019

Switzerland U21

- UEFA European Under-21 Championship runner-up: 2011

Individual

- Croatian Cup top scorer: 2016–17
- Football Oscar – Prva HNL Team of the Year: 2017, 2018
