= Lovelace Ackah =

Ghanaian soccer defender (born 1976)

Personal information
- Date of birth: July 8, 1976 (age 50)
- Place of birth: Kumasi, Ghana
- Height: 6 ft 1 in (1.85 m)
- Position: Defender

Senior career*
Years	Team	Apps	(Gls)
1993–1997	King Faisal Babes		
1998	Chicago Stingers		
1999	Milwaukee Rampage	23	(0)
1999–2009	Milwaukee Wave (indoor)	304	(34)
2004	Milwaukee Wave United	10	(0)
- * Club domestic league appearances and goals as of March 23, 2010

Lovelace Ackah (born July 8, 1976) is a retired Ghanaian soccer defender. He played his career largely in the United States.

== Before joining the Wave ==
Lovelace Ackah was born in Kumasi, Ghana. Before playing for the Milwaukee Wave, he played four seasons with King Faisal Babes in Ghana, followed by a year with the Chicago Stingers.

== International ==
Prior to moving to America, Ackah played for the U-21 Ghana national team.

== Career with the Wave ==
In 1999, Ackah played for the Milwaukee Rampage of the USL A-League. He joined the Milwaukee Wave for the 1999–2000 season. In his first year in the league, he was named to the NPSL's All-Rookie First Team.

In his second season with the wave, he was one of only four Wave players to play all 40 games. He was a key to the Wave's 2nd consecutive title, with 10 blocks in the 2001 playoffs.

Ackah was selected to his first All-Star game during the 2001–02 season.

In the 2002–03 season, Ackah made his 200th career block. He was also selected to his 2nd career All-Star game. His streak of playing in 122 consecutive games was broken in early January due to a game suspension from receiving a red card. That streak still stands as the fourth longest in the Wave's history.

He played at least the 2004 season with the Milwaukee Wave United of the USL A-League.^{2004 Wave United Stats}

Ackah continued his success during the 2003–04 season; he had 67 blocks in 34 games. He also contributed 5 goals and 4 assists. He had 6 blocks in the All-Star game that year, more than any other player there.

The 2004–05 season was one of milestones for Ackah. He made his 300th block in March. He also put a goal in to help celebrate his 200th career game for the Wave in early December.

Although receiving the honor of being the league's Defense Player of the Week in November, Ackah missed most of the 2005–06 season due to a foot injury.

The MISL disbanded after the 2007–08 season, and the Wave joined the newly founded Xtreme Soccer League. Ackah re-signed with the Wave on November 6, 2008, allowing him to play a 10th season with the club.

== Personal life ==
Ackah has two sons, Lovelace Jr. and Vince with his wife, Jael, and lives in New Berlin, Wisconsin.

== Coaching career ==
He coaches for Strike FC Soccer Club in Hartland, Wisconsin.

== See also ==
Lovelace Ackah's Milwaukee Wave Player Page
Milwaukee Wave Official Site
MISL Official Site
