= Joseph Larweh Attamah =

Ghanaian footballer (born 1994)

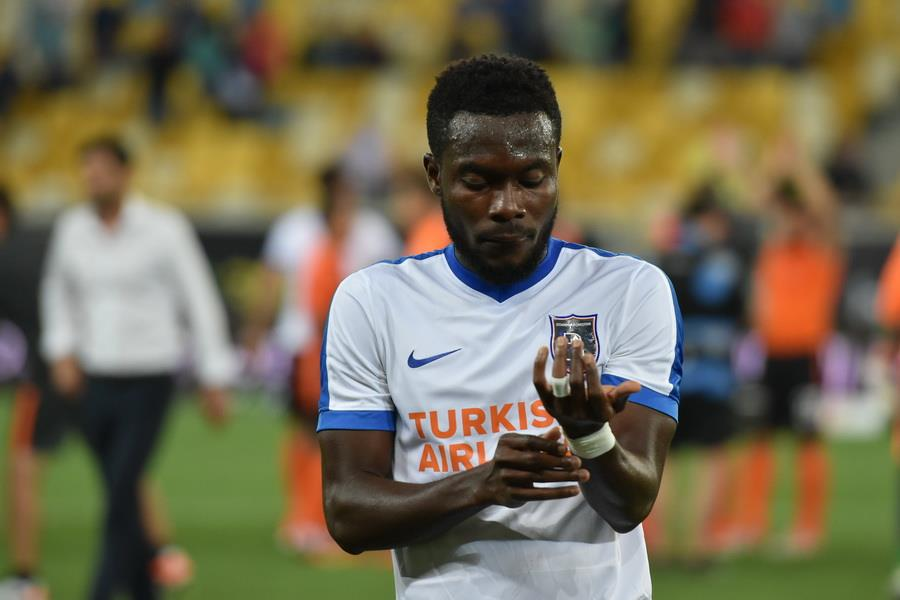

Personal information
- Full name: Joseph Larweh Attamah
- Date of birth: 22 May 1994 (age 32)
- Place of birth: Accra, Ghana
- Height: 1.80 m (5 ft 11 in)
- Position: Defender

Team information
- Current team: Sarıyer
- Number: 3

Youth career
- Tema Youth

Senior career*
Years	Team	Apps	(Gls)
2011–2014	Tema Youth	15	(0)
2014–2016	Adana Demirspor	69	(5)
2016–2020	İstanbul Başakşehir	51	(4)
2019–2020	→ Çaykur Rizespor (loan)	14	(0)
2020	→ Fatih Karagümrük (loan)	17	(0)
2020–2025	Kayserispor	132	(4)
2025–2026	Çorum	30	(0)
2026–	Sarıyer	6	(0)

International career^{‡}
2013	Ghana U20	9	(1)
2017–	Ghana	6	(0)
- * Club domestic league appearances and goals as of 13 October 2026 ‡ National team caps and goals as of 12:57, 14 November 2021 (UTC)

Joseph Larweh Attamah (born 22 May 1994) is a Ghanaian professional footballer who plays as a defender for Turkish TFF 1. Lig club Sarıyer.

== Career ==
Born in Ghana, Attamah started his career with local side Tema Youth where he played at least 15 Ghana Premier League matches without goal. He played in the Turkey 2013 FIFA U-20 World Cup, scoring one goal. In August 2014 he moved abroad for the first time joining Turkish First Division side Adana Demirspor.

On 2 June 2016, Attamah joined Süper Lig club İstanbul Başakşehir, signing a four-year contract. After only playing 11 games in the 2018–19 season, he joined Rizespor on a season-long loan. On 25 January 2020, he was loaned to Fatih Karagümrük after his loan with Çaykur Rizespor was terminated.

On 2 September 2020, Attamah joined Kayserispor signing a three-year contract, after spending the last season on loan at Rizespor and Fatih Karagümrük.

In the summer of 2025 the Ghanaian moved to Çorum FK.

== Career statistics ==
=== Club ===
As of 6 October 2023

Appearances and goals by club, season and competition
Club	Season	League			National Cup		Europe		Total	
Club	Season	Division	Apps	Goals	Apps	Goals	Apps	Goals	Apps	Goals
Adana Demirspor	2014–15	TFF First League	34	2	6	0	—		40	2
Adana Demirspor	2015–16	TFF First League	35	3	1	0	—		36	3
Adana Demirspor	Total		69	5	7	0	0	0	76	5
İstanbul Başakşehir	2016–17	Süper Lig	15	1	11	0	1 (Note: Appearance in UEFA Europa League)	0	27	1
İstanbul Başakşehir	2017–18	Süper Lig	25	3	2	1	9 (Note: 4 appearances in UEFA Champions League and 5 appearances in UEFA Europa League)	0	36	4
İstanbul Başakşehir	2018–19	Süper Lig	11	0	4	0	0	0	15	0
İstanbul Başakşehir	2019–20	Süper Lig	0	0	0	0	1 (Note: Appearance in UEFA Champions League)	0	1	0
İstanbul Başakşehir	Total		51	4	17	1	11	0	79	5
Çaykur Rizespor (loan)	2019–20	Süper Lig	14	0	1	0	—		15	0
Fatih Karagümrük (loan)	2019–20	TFF First League	17	0	0	0	—		17	0
Kayserispor	2020–21	Süper Lig	31	0	2	0	—		33	0
Kayserispor	2021–22	Süper Lig	30	2	7	0	—		37	2
Kayserispor	2022–23	Süper Lig	9	0	0	0	—		9	0
Kayserispor	2023–24	Süper Lig	7	0	0	0	—		7	0
Kayserispor	Total		77	2	9	0	0	0	86	2
Career total			228	11	34	1	11	0	273	12

=== International ===
As of matches played on 15 July 2019

Ghana national team
Year	Apps	Goals
2017	2	0
2018	2	0
2019	0	0
Total	4	0
