= Olivier Kemen =

Cameroonian footballer (born 1996)

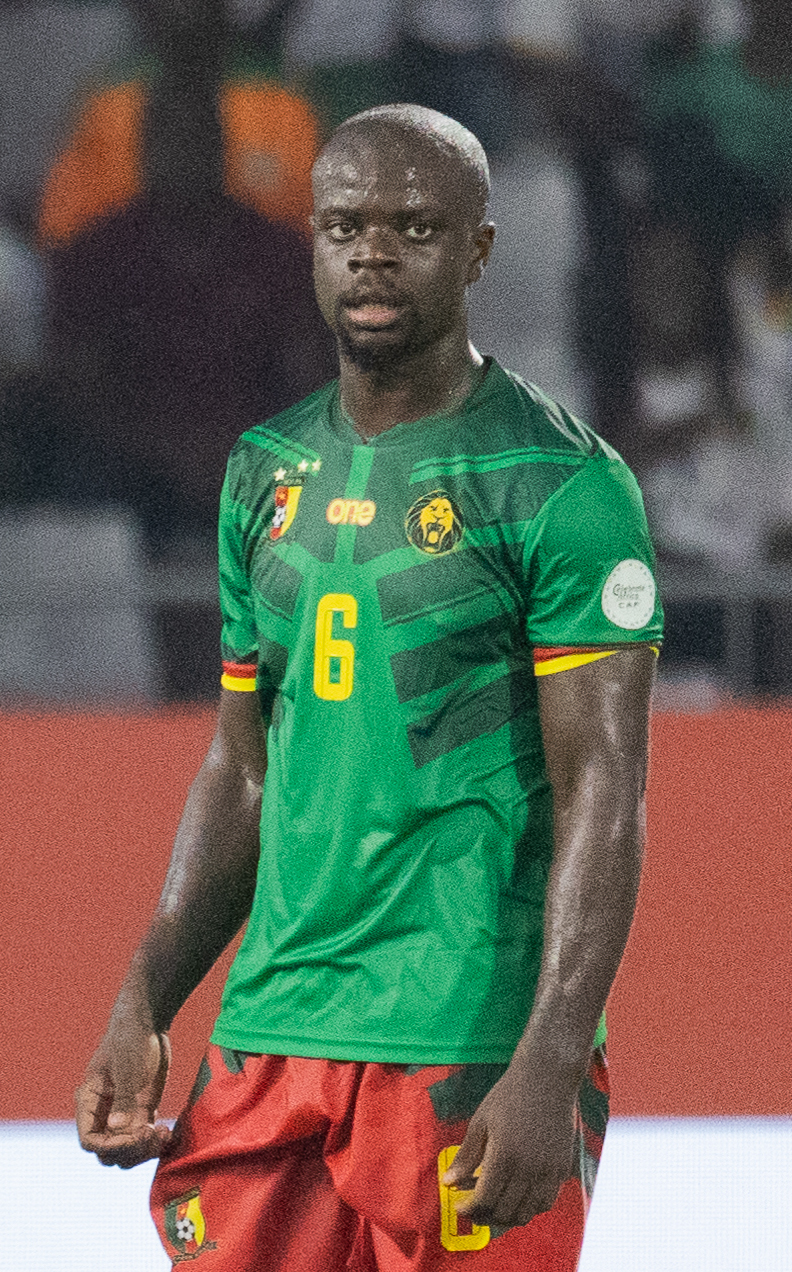
- Kemen with Cameroon in 2024

Personal information
- Date of birth: 20 July 1996 (age 30)
- Place of birth: Douala, Cameroon
- Height: 1.77 m (5 ft 10 in)
- Position: Midfielder

Team information
- Current team: İstanbul Başakşehir
- Number: 8

Youth career
- 2005–2009: Garenne-Colombes
- 2009–2010: Boulogne-Billancourt
- 2010–2013: Metz
- 2013–2015: Newcastle United
- 2015–2016: Lyon

Senior career*
Years	Team	Apps	(Gls)
2015–2016	Lyon B	32	(6)
2016–2019	Lyon	4	(0)
2017–2018	→ Gazélec Ajaccio (loan)	42	(7)
2019–2021	Chamois Niortais	62	(6)
2021–2024	Kayserispor	62	(6)
2024–	İstanbul Başakşehir	76	(4)

International career^{‡}
2012	France U16	6	(0)
2012	France U17	3	(0)
2013–2014	France U18	5	(0)
2014–2015	France U19	13	(1)
2015–2016	France U20	8	(0)
2023–	Cameroon	9	(1)
- * Club domestic league appearances and goals as of 10 June 2026 ‡ National team caps and goals as of 23:05, 4 January 2026 (UTC)

Olivier Kemen (born 20 July 1996) is a Cameroonian professional footballer who plays as a midfielder for Süper Lig club İstanbul Başakşehir. A former youth international for France, he plays for the Cameroon national team.

== Club career ==
Kemen is a youth exponent from Metz. He made his Ligue 1 debut for Lyon on 28 February 2016 against Paris Saint-Germain replacing Rafael after 75 minutes in a 2–1 home win.

On 11 January 2017, Kemen joined Ligue 2 side Ajaccio on loan until the end of the season. On 12 July 2017, his loan was extended for another season.

He signed for Chamois Niortais in July 2019, and went on to make 62 appearances in Ligue 2 for the club.

On 29 August 2021, after two season with Niort, Kemen joined Süper Lig club Kayserispor for an undisclosed fee, signing a three-year contract.

== International career ==
Born in Cameroon, Kemen moved to France at a young age. He is a youth international for France. He debuted with the senior Cameroon national team in a 1–1 2023 Africa Cup of Nations qualification tie with Namibia on 24 March 2023, scoring his side's only goal.

On 28 December 2023, he was selected from the list of 27 Cameroonian players selected by Rigobert Song to compete in the 2023 Africa Cup of Nations.

Kemen was included in the list of Cameroonian players selected by coach David Pagou to participate in the 2025 Africa Cup of Nations.

== Career statistics ==
=== Club ===
As of 14 December 2025

Appearances and goals by club, season and competition
Club	Season	League			Cup		League Cup		Europe (Note: Includes UEFA Europa League)		Other (Note: Includes Ligue 2 relegation playoffs)		Total	
Club	Season	Division	Apps	Goals	Apps	Goals	Apps	Goals	Apps	Goals	Apps	Goals	Apps	Goals
Lyon	2015–16	Ligue 1	2	0	0	0	0	0	0	0	0	0	2	0
Lyon	2016–17	Ligue 1	2	0	0	0	0	0	0	0	0	0	2	0
Lyon	Total		4	0	0	0	0	0	0	0	0	0	4	0
Gazélec Ajaccio (loan)	2016–17	Ligue 2	16	4	0	0	0	0	—		—		16	4
Gazélec Ajaccio (loan)	2017–18	Ligue 2	26	3	0	0	2	0	—		—		28	3
Gazélec Ajaccio (loan)	Total		42	7	0	0	2	0	0	0	0	0	44	7
Chamois Niortais	2019–20	Ligue 2	27	2	2	0	2	0	—		—		31	2
Chamois Niortais	2020–21	Ligue 2	34	4	1	0	—		—		2	1	37	5
Chamois Niortais	2021–22	Ligue 2	1	0	0	0	—		—		—		1	0
Chamois Niortais	Total		62	6	3	0	2	0	0	0	2	1	69	7
Kayserispor	2021–22	Süper Lig	22	1	6	0	—		—		—		28	1
Kayserispor	2022–23	Süper Lig	27	3	4	0	—		—		—		31	3
Kayserispor	2023–24	Süper Lig	13	2	0	0	—		—		—		13	2
Kayserispor	Total		62	6	10	0	0	0	0	0	0	0	72	6
İstanbul Başakşehir	2023–24	Süper Lig	14	2	2	0	—		—		—		16	2
İstanbul Başakşehir	2024–25	Süper Lig	33	2	2	0	—		9 (Note: Appearances in UEFA Conference League)	2	—		44	4
İstanbul Başakşehir	2025–26	Süper Lig	13	0	0	0	—		3	0	—		16	0
İstanbul Başakşehir	Total		60	4	4	0	—		12	2	—		76	6
Career total			197	21	15	0	4	0	12	0	2	1	264	26

=== International ===
As of match played 4 January 2026

Appearances and goals by national team and year
National team	Year	Apps	Goals
Cameroon	2023	3	1
Cameroon	2024	3	0
Cameroon	2025	2	0
Cameroon	2026	1	0
Total		9	1

Scores and results list Cameroon's goal tally first, score column indicates score after each Kemen goal.

List of international goals scored by Olivier Kemen
No.	Date	Venue	Opponent	Score	Result	Competition
1	24 March 2023	Ahmadou Ahidjo Stadium, Yaoundé, Cameroon	Namibia	1–1	1–1	2023 Africa Cup of Nations qualification
