= Mame Thiam =

Senegalese footballer

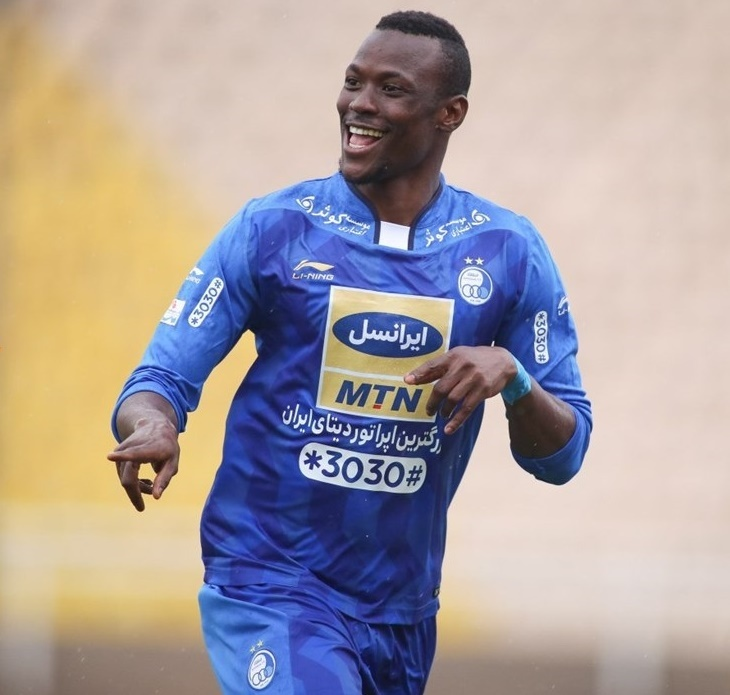
- Thiam with Esteghlal in 2018

Personal information
- Full name: Mame Baba Thiam
- Date of birth: 9 October 1992 (age 34)
- Place of birth: Nguidile, Senegal
- Height: 1.87 m (6 ft 2 in)
- Position: Forward

Team information
- Current team: Çorum
- Number: 9

Youth career
- 2007–2008: Real San Marco
- 2008–2009: Treviso
- 2009–2010: Inter Milan
- 2009–2010: → Sassuolo (loan)
- 2010: Sassuolo
- 2010–2011: Inter Milan

Senior career*
Years	Team	Apps	(Gls)
2011–2013	Inter Milan	0	(0)
2011–2012	→ Avellino (loan)	26	(4)
2012–2013	→ Südtirol (loan)	27	(6)
2013–2014	Lanciano	22	(3)
2014–2017	Juventus	0	(0)
2014–2015	→ Lanciano (loan)	34	(8)
2015–2016	→ Zulte Waregem (loan)	28	(9)
2016–2017	→ PAOK (loan)	1	(0)
2017	→ Empoli (loan)	15	(1)
2018	Esteghlal	6	(4)
2018–2019	Ajman	26	(13)
2019–2020	Kasımpaşa	25	(11)
2020–2021	Fenerbahçe	30	(6)
2021–2024	Kayserispor	70	(32)
2024	Pendikspor	17	(6)
2024–2026	Eyüpspor	46	(17)
2026–	Çorum	18	(9)

International career
2020–2022	Senegal	4	(0)
Medal record
Men's football
Representing Senegal
Africa Cup of Nations
Winner	2021 Cameroon
- * Club domestic league appearances and goals as of 16 October 2026

Mame Baba Thiam (born 9 October 1992) is a Senegalese professional footballer who plays as a forward for Turkish Süper Lig club Çorum and the Senegal national team.

== Club career ==
=== Youth career ===
Born in Nguidile, Louga Region, Thiam left for Italy at young age. He was selected to Veneto region Allievi team for Coppa Nazionale Primavera, a competition against other Italy regional representatives in 2007–08 season. At club level he played for Real San Marco, from Chirignago, mainland area of Venice municipality. In 2008, he was signed by Veneto club Treviso. In January 2009 he was signed by Internazionale from Treviso along with Samuel Longo. He immediately entered Inter's Allievi Nazionali under-17 team, scoring 4 goals in regular season (group stage). Due to Inter's Primavera under-20 team had many strikers, namely Denis Alibec, Mattia Destro, Simone Dell'Agnello, Giuseppe Angarano and Longo, Thiam left for Sassuolo's Primavera team in August 2009. The Emilia-Romagna side also borrowed Alberto Gallinetta and kept numbers of former Inter players by extended the loans or excised the option to sign outright from Inter, such as Pellegrino Albanese, Raffaele Conforto and Giorgio Schiavini. Thiam was the starting forward along with Diego Falcinelli, who also from Inter academy. However the coach also used other formation and preferred Falcinelli as sole centre forward despite Thiam also played that role few time. That season Thiam scored 4 times.

During the season, Inter formed a complex deal with Sassuolo, which allowed Thiam to join Sassuolo for free in January 2010 (Inter registered a loss of €71,000), then Thiam re-joined Inter on 30 August in co-ownership deal, with Thiam's contract treated as a financial asset in Sassuolo's account and an intangible asset in Inter account, as well as the "parent" club of the co-ownership contract became Sassuolo instead of Inter. With Inter Primavera team, he scored 4 goals in the regular season, behind strikers Dell'Agnello, Alibec and midfielder Milan Jirásek. He also won 2011 Torneo di Viareggio with the reserves.

=== Serie C1 loans ===
On 30 August 2011, he left for Avellino from Inter Milan. He made his professional debut on 25 September against Viareggio as a substitute for Gianluca De Angelis. He made his first start in the following game against Sorrento. He played the successive game, scoring on 13, 16 and 30 October (round 7, 8 and 10), partnering Zigoni, Fabrizio Lasagna and De Angelis respectively. However, after a goal drought Thiam lost the starting place, and became the backup of De Angelis and Zigoni. He returned to starting XI again on 7 March 2012, partnering Zigoni. In June 2012 Inter also acquired Thiam outright, as Sassuolo gave up their 50% registration rights of Thiam.

On 12 July 2012, Thiam moved to another third level club, South Tyrol (German: Südtirol, Italian: Alto Adige).

=== Lanciano and Juventus ===
On 15 July 2013, Thiam joined Serie B club Lanciano on a free transfer. On 30 January 2014, Lanciano signed goalkeeper Laurențiu Brănescu in a co-ownership deal for €250,000 cash plus 50% registration rights of Thiam (50% "card" of Thiam was valued at €1.4 million; 50% "card" of Brănescu was valued €1.65 million). Thiam signed a 4 1/2-year contract with The Old Lady.

Thiam spent the rest of the 2013–14 season in Lanciano. He continues in Lanciano in the 2014–2015 season. In June 2015 Juventus signed Thiam outright for another €800,000; on 8 July Lanciano signed Filippo Penna (about €340,000) and Marco Di Benedetto (undisclosed) as compensations.

==== Zulte Waregem (loan) ====
On 26 July 2015, Thiam signed with Zulte Waregem in a temporary deal. The move made Juventus had a signing quota for non-European Union nationals (another quota was from Carlos Tevez), which the club later signed Alex Sandro, who counted as a non-EU.

After the loan Thiam returned to Juventus for their pre-season camp.

==== PAOK (loan) ====
On 31 August 2016, Thiam joined PAOK on loan.

==== Empoli (loan) ====
On 13 January 2017, Thiam signed with Empoli in a temporary deal. He scored a goal against A.C. Milan on 23 April 2017, giving Empoli a crucial 3-points for their battle from relegation. He also played in the last round of the season, which Empoli relegated by losing to already relegated Palermo.

After the loan, Thiam returned to Turin once again for their pre-season camp. It was reported that he canceled the contract with Juventus in a mutual consent in September 2017.

=== Esteghlal ===
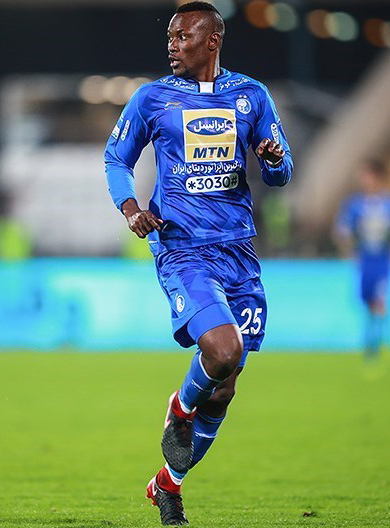
Thiam during his debut for Esteghlal in 2018

On 6 February 2018, Thiam signed a 1 1/2-year contract with Esteghlal after he passed the medical examination. He was assigned the number 25 shirt to wear in the league, however he chose to wear his favourite number 7 in the AFC Champions League as it was vacant.

Thiam made his debut on 8 February in a 3–0 victory against Sepidrood coming on as a substitute for Ali Ghorbani in the 82nd minute. He started his first match for Esteghlal in the Champions League match against Al-Hilal in which he his first goal for the club. The goal was Esteghlal's 200th goal in AFC Champions League history and they became the first Iranian team to reach that milestone. Esteghlal eventually won 1–0 and Thiam was named Man of the Match for his performance. On 24 February, Thiam opened his scoring account in the league with a brace in a 4–1 away victory against Foolad. He also provided an assist for another goal in that match. On 6 March, he scored another brace in a 2–2 champions league draw against Al-Ain, and was named "Man of the match" for the second consecutive time. On 3 May, Thiam scored Esteghlal's only goal to defeat Khooneh be Khooneh 1–0 in the 2018 Hazfi Cup Final, winning his first piece of silverware with the club. On 15 May, he scored his first hat-trick in a 3–1 win over Zob Ahan. His three goals saw him become the club's all-time foreign leading goalscorer, overtaking Jlloyd Samuel's record of 11 goals on the day of his death. Due to his performance, he was named round of 16's second leg player of the week and was included in the round of 16's team of the week. Thiam finished his season with twelve goals in all competitions in 13 appearances, the club finished 3rd in the league that season.

=== Ajman ===
On 8 August 2018, Thiam joined UAE team Ajman from Esteghlal FC on a two-year contract for an undisclosed fee. Thiam made his debut for the club on 30 August, in a 1–0 league victory over Al-Nasr in which he scored his first goal for the club.

=== Kasımpaşa ===
On 24 June 2019, Thiam joined Turkish Süper Lig side Kasımpaşa on a two-year contract. He made his debut for the club on 18 August against Trabzonspor. In the next match, he scored his first for the club in a 4–1 defeat against Alanyaspor.

=== Fenerbahçe ===
On 18 August 2020, Thiam joined fellow Süper Lig club Fenerbahçe on a three-year contract.

=== Kayserispor ===
In the summer of 2021 the African footballer signed for Central Anatolian side Kayserispor on a three-year contract.

== International career ==
Thiam first represented the Senegal national team in a friendly 3–1 loss to Morocco on 9 October 2020.

He was part of Senegal's squad for the 2021 Africa Cup of Nations; the Lions of Teranga went on to win the tournament for the first time in their history.

Thiam was appointed a Grand Officer of the National Order of the Lion by President of Senegal Macky Sall following the nation's victory at the tournament.

=== International ===
Appearances and goals by national team and year
National team	Year	Apps	Goals
Senegal
Senegal	2020	1	0
Senegal	2021	2	0
Senegal	2022	1	0
Total		4	0

== Career statistics ==
As of match played 29 November 2025

Appearances and goals by club, season and competition
Club	Season	League			National cup (Note: Includes Coppa Italia, Belgian Cup, Greek Football Cup, Iranian Hazfi Cup, UAE League Cup, Turkish Cup)		Continental		Total	
Club	Season	Division	Apps	Goals	Apps	Goals	Apps	Goals	Apps	Goals
Avellino	2011–12	Lega Pro	26	4	0	0	—		26	4
Südtirol	2012–13	Lega Pro	29	6	1	0	—		30	6
Virtus Lanciano	2013–14	Serie B	22	3	1	0	—		23	3
Virtus Lanciano	2014–15	Serie B	34	8	2	1	—		36	9
Virtus Lanciano	Total		56	11	3	1	—		59	12
Zulte Waregem	2015–16	Belgian Pro League	28	9	1	0	—		29	9
PAOK	2016–17	Super League Greece	1	0	2	0	5 (Note: Appearances in UEFA Europa League)	0	8	0
Empoli	2016–17	Serie A	15	1	0	0	—		15	1
Esteghlal	2017–18	Persian Gulf Pro League	6	4	1	1	6 (Note: Appearances in AFC Champions League)	7	13	12
Ajman	2018–19	UAE Pro-League	26	13	4	0	—		30	13
Kasımpaşa	2019–20	Süper Lig	25	11	3	1	—		28	12
Fenerbahçe	2020–21	Süper Lig	30	6	4	2	—		34	8
Kayserispor	2021–22	Süper Lig	24	11	3	1	—		27	12
Kayserispor	2022–23	Süper Lig	27	9	3	0	—		30	9
Kayserispor	2023–24	Süper Lig	19	12	0	0	—		19	12
Kayserispor	Career total		70	32	6	1	–		76	33
Pendikspor	2023–24	Süper Lig	17	6	1	0	—		18	6
Eyüpspor	2024–25	Süper Lig	32	15	3	1	—		35	16
Eyüpspor	2025–26	Süper Lig	12	2	0	0	—		12	2
Career total			373	120	29	7	11	7	413	134

== Honours ==
Esteghlal

- Hazfi Cup: 2017–18

Senegal

- Africa Cup of Nations: 2021

Individual

- Grand Officer of the National Order of the Lion: 2022
