= Miguel Cardoso (footballer, born 1994) =

Portuguese footballer

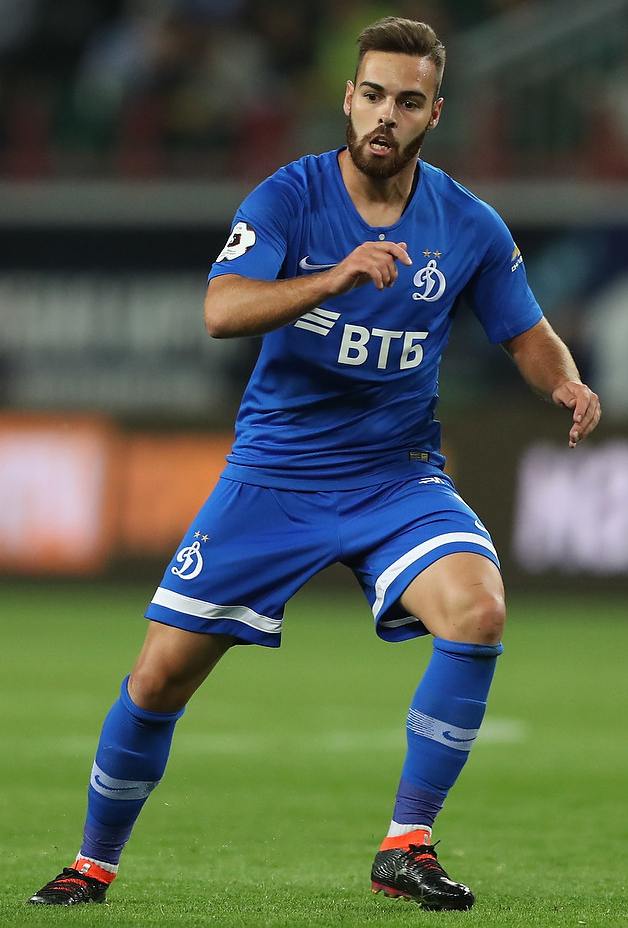
- Cardoso with Dynamo Moscow in 2018

Personal information
- Full name: Miguel Filipe Nunes Cardoso
- Date of birth: 19 June 1994 (age 32)
- Place of birth: São Sebastião, Portugal
- Height: 1.76 m (5 ft 9 in)
- Position: Winger

Team information
- Current team: Erzurumspor
- Number: 20

Youth career
- 2002–2003: Rio de Mouro
- 2003–2011: Benfica
- 2008–2009: → Estrela Amadora (loan)
- 2011–2012: Casa Pia
- 2012–2013: Real Massamá

Senior career*
Years	Team	Apps	(Gls)
2012–2014	Real Massamá	30	(6)
2014–2015	Deportivo B	51	(19)
2015–2016	Deportivo La Coruña	3	(0)
2016	→ União Madeira (loan)	10	(0)
2016–2018	Tondela	64	(9)
2018–2021	Dynamo Moscow	22	(4)
2020	→ Tambov (loan)	1	(0)
2020–2021	→ B-SAD (loan)	30	(6)
2021–2026	Kayserispor	154	(22)
2026–	Erzurumspor	5	(1)
- * Club domestic league appearances and goals as of 20:57, 24 September 2026 (UTC)

Miguel Filipe Nunes Cardoso (born 19 June 1994) is a Portuguese professional footballer who plays as a winger for Süper Lig club Erzurumspor.

== Club career ==
Born in São Sebastião da Pedreira, Lisbon, Cardoso finished his development with Real Massamá in 2012, after having represented four other clubs including Benfica and Casa Pia. He made his senior debut on 2 September 2012, coming on as a second-half substitute in a 1–1 fourth division home draw against Pêro Pinheiro.

Cardoso scored his first goal as a senior on 30 March 2013, the second in the 6–1 home rout of Peniche. He finished the season with 17 appearances and three goals.

On 29 January 2014, aged 20, Cardoso moved to Spain with Deportivo de La Coruña, being assigned to the reserves in the Tercera División. On 31 March 2015, after scoring a hat-trick in a 5–0 home victory over Silva, he signed a professional contract running until 2017, being also promoted to the main squad.

Cardoso played his first game as a professional on 2 December 2015, starting in a 2–1 away win against Llagostera in the round of 32 of the Copa del Rey. He first appeared in La Liga ten days later, replacing Juanfran for the last 20 minutes and providing an assist for Lucas Pérez as the visitors came from behind 2–0 at Barcelona to draw 2–2.

On 28 January 2016, Cardoso was loaned to União da Madeira until June 2017. On 4 July, he cut ties with Dépor and signed for Tondela later that day. In his second season at the latter, he scored eight Primeira Liga goals to help to an 11th-place finish, adding six assists.

Cardoso joined Russian Premier League club Dynamo Moscow on 31 August 2018, on a four-year contract. In his second game as a starter, on 14 September, he opened the scoring in the fifth minute of an eventual 1–1 away draw with defending champions Lokomotiv Moscow.

On 19 February 2020, Cardoso was loaned to Tambov of the same country and league until the end of the campaign. In August, he returned to his country after joining B-SAD also in a temporary deal.

Cardoso terminated his contract with Dynamo in August 2021, by mutual consent. He moved to Turkish Süper Lig's Kayserispor in the same week.

On 12 May 2025, Cardoso scored all of his team's goals in a 3–1 home victory over Antalyaspor. The last came through a 63rd-minute penalty kick.

Kayserispor were relegated at the end of 2025–26. Cardoso remained in the competition, however, joining newly-promoted Erzurumspor on a two-year deal.
