= Mehmet Eray Özbek =

Turkish footballer

Personal information
- Date of birth: 9 January 2003 (age 23)
- Place of birth: Kocasinan, Turkey
- Height: 1.78 m (5 ft 10 in)
- Position: Midfielder

Team information
- Current team: Bandırmaspor
- Number: 21

Youth career
- 2014–2019: Kayserispor

Senior career*
Years	Team	Apps	(Gls)
2019–2026	Kayserispor	32	(1)
2023	→ Kırşehir FK (loan)	4	(0)
2026–	Bandırmaspor	0	(0)

International career^{‡}
2019	Turkey U16	3	(0)
2024	Turkey U20	2	(0)
- * Club domestic league appearances and goals as of 17 October 2026 ‡ National team caps and goals as of 15 October 2024

Mehmet Eray Özbek (born 9 January 2003) is a Turkish professional footballer who plays as a midfielder for TFF 1. Lig club Bandırmaspor.

== Club career ==
Özbek joined the youth academy of Kayserispor in 2014, and worked his way up their youth categories. On 24 January 2019, he started training with Kayserispor's senior side. On 16 August 2019, he signed his first contract with the club for 3 seasons. He made his senior and professional debut with Kayserispor in a 3–3 Turkish Cup tie with Manisa FK on 19 December 2019. On 22 June 2022, he extended his contract with Kayserispor for 4 more seasons. On 3 February 2023, he joined Kırşehir FK on loan in the TFF Second League, for the second half of the 2022–23 season.

== International career ==
Özbek first played for the Turkey U16s in January 2019. In October 2024, he was called up to the Turkey U20s.
