= Bilal Bayazıt =

Dutch footballer (born 1999)

Personal information
- Date of birth: 8 April 1999 (age 27)
- Place of birth: Amsterdam, Netherlands
- Height: 1.85 m (6 ft 1 in)
- Position: Goalkeeper

Team information
- Current team: Samsunspor
- Number: 25

Youth career
- Zeeburgia
- Ajax
- 2010–2014: AZ Alkmaar
- 2014–2017: Vitesse

Senior career*
Years	Team	Apps	(Gls)
2017–2019	Vitesse II	27	(0)
2017–2021	Vitesse	0	(0)
2021–2026	Kayserispor	123	(0)
2026–	Samsunspor	0	(0)

International career^{‡}
2013	Netherlands U15	1	(0)
2015	Netherlands U16	2	(0)
2015	Netherlands U17	2	(0)
- * Club domestic league appearances and goals as of 19:00, 9 May 2026 (UTC) ‡ National team caps and goals as of 03:58, 22 May 2022 (UTC)

Bilal Bayazıt (born 8 April 1999) is a Dutch professional footballer who plays as a goalkeeper for the Turkish club Samsunspor.

== Professional career ==
Bayazıt began his career with the reserves of Vitesse, and was the backup goalkeeper for the senior side. He transferred to Kayserispor on 10 August 2021. He made his professional debut with Kayserispor in a 4–0 Turkish Cup win over Iğdır FK on 1 December 2021. He kept another clean sheet in his second game in a dramatic last-minute win (1–0) over Fenerbahçe on 8 February 2022.

== International career ==
Born in the Netherlands, Bayazıt is of Turkish descent. He is a youth international for the Netherlands, having represented the Netherlands U16s and Netherlands U17s.

== Career statistics ==
As of match played 9 May 2026

Appearances and goals by club, season and competition
Club	Season	League			Cup		Europe		Other		Total	
Club	Season	Division	Apps	Goals	Apps	Goals	Apps	Goals	Apps	Goals	Apps	Goals
Vitesse II	2018–19	Tweede Divisie	27	0	0	0	—		—		27	0
Vitesse	2017–18	Eredivisie	0	0	0	0	0	0	0	0	0	0
Vitesse	2018–19	Eredivisie	0	0	0	0	0	0	—		0	0
Vitesse	2019–20	Eredivisie	0	0	0	0	—		—		0	0
Vitesse	2020–21	Eredivisie	0	0	0	0	—		—		0	0
Vitesse	Total		0	0	0	0	0	0	0	0	0	0
Kayserispor	2021–22	Süper Lig	5	0	2	0	—		—		7	0
Kayserispor	2022–23	Süper Lig	30	0	1	0	—		—		31	0
Kayserispor	2023–24	Süper Lig	35	0	0	0	—		—		35	0
Kayserispor	2024–25	Süper Lig	25	0	0	0	—		—		25	0
Kayserispor	2025–26	Süper Lig	28	0	0	0	—		—		28	0
Kayserispor	Total		123	0	3	0	—		—		126	0
Career total			150	0	3	0	0	0	0	0	153	0
