= Arif Kocaman =

Turkish footballer

Personal information
- Date of birth: 14 September 2003 (age 23)
- Place of birth: Tavşanlı, Turkey
- Height: 1.84 m (6 ft 0 in)
- Position: Centre-back

Team information
- Current team: Antalyaspor
- Number: 43

Youth career
- 2013–2017: Tavşanlı Linyitspor
- 2017–2021: Sakaryaspor

Senior career*
| Years | Team | Apps | (Gls) |
| 2021–2022 | Sakaryaspor | 1 | (0) |
| 2022–2026 | Kayserispor | 48 | (2) |
| 2026 | → Sakaryaspor (loan) | 12 | (0) |
| 2026– | Antalyaspor | 0 | (0) |

International career^{‡}
| 2022–2023 | Turkey U21 | 3 | (0) |
- * Club domestic league appearances and goals as of 18 October 2026 ‡ National team caps and goals as of 20 June 2023

Arif Kocaman (born 14 September 2003) is a Turkish professional footballer who plays as a centre-back for TFF 1. Lig club Antalyaspor.

== Professional career ==
Kocaman is a youth product of Tavşanlı Linyitspor and Sakaryaspor. He signed his first professional contract with Sakaryaspor in May 2021, and made an appearance with them in the TFF Second League. He transferred to the Süper Lig club Kayserispor in January 2022, signing a 4-year contract. He made his professional debut with Kayserispor as a late substitute in a 3–0 Süper Lig win over Yeni Malatyaspor on 14 May 2022.

== International career ==
Kocaman was first called up to the Turkey U21s for a set of matches in September 2022.
