= Talha Sarıarslan =

Turkish footballer (born 2004)

Personal information
- Date of birth: 18 September 2004 (age 22)
- Place of birth: Kocasinan, Turkey
- Position: Forward

Team information
- Current team: Kayserispor
- Number: 99

Youth career
- 2014–2020: Kayserispor

Senior career*
Years	Team	Apps	(Gls)
2020–	Kayserispor	49	(4)

International career^{‡}
2019	Turkey U15	2	(1)
2021	Turkey U18	1	(0)
- * Club domestic league appearances and goals as of 1 June 2026 ‡ National team caps and goals as of 20:23, 13 January 2023 (UTC)

Talha Sarıarslan (born 18 January 2004) is a Turkish professional footballer who plays as a forward for TFF 1. Lig club Kayserispor.

== Career ==
Sarıarslan is a youth product of Kayserispor, and started training with the senior team after a prolific stint with their U19s. On 14 March 2022, he signed his first professional contract with Kayserispor. He made his professional debut with them as a late substitute in a 5–0 Turkish Cup win over Yomraspor on 4 November 2020.

== International career ==
Sarıarslan is a youth international for Turkey, having played up to the Turkey U18s.
