= Hayrullah Erkip =

Turkish footballer

Personal information
- Date of birth: 20 June 2003 (age 23)
- Place of birth: Kayseri, Turkey
- Height: 1.76 m (5 ft 9 in)
- Position: Winger

Team information
- Current team: Düzcespor

Youth career
- 2013–2021: Kayserispor
- 2021: Beşiktaş
- 2021–2022: Kayserispor

Senior career*
Years	Team	Apps	(Gls)
2022–	Kayserispor	7	(1)
2023	→ Gençlerbirliği (loan)	5	(0)
2024–	→ Düzcespor (loan)	0	(0)
- * Club domestic league appearances and goals as of 3 February 2024

Hayrullah Erkip (born 20 June 2003) is a Turkish professional footballer who plays as a winger for Düzcespor on loan from Kayserispor.

== Professional career ==
A youth product of Kayserispor, Erkip had a brief stint with the academy of Beşiktaş in 2021 before returning to Kayserispor that same year. On 17 January 2022, he signed his first professional contract with Kayserispor for 4.5 years. He made his professional debut with Kayserispor in a 1–1 Süper Lig tie with Gaziantep FK on 6 May 2022. He scored his first goal in his second professional league appearance with Kayserispor, a 3–0 win over Yeni Malatyaspor on 14 May 2022. On 12 January 2023, Erkip joined Gençlerbirliği on loan.
