= Kadir Has Stadium =

Stadium in Kayseri, Turkey

Kadir Has Stadyumu
- RHG Enertürk Enerji Stadium
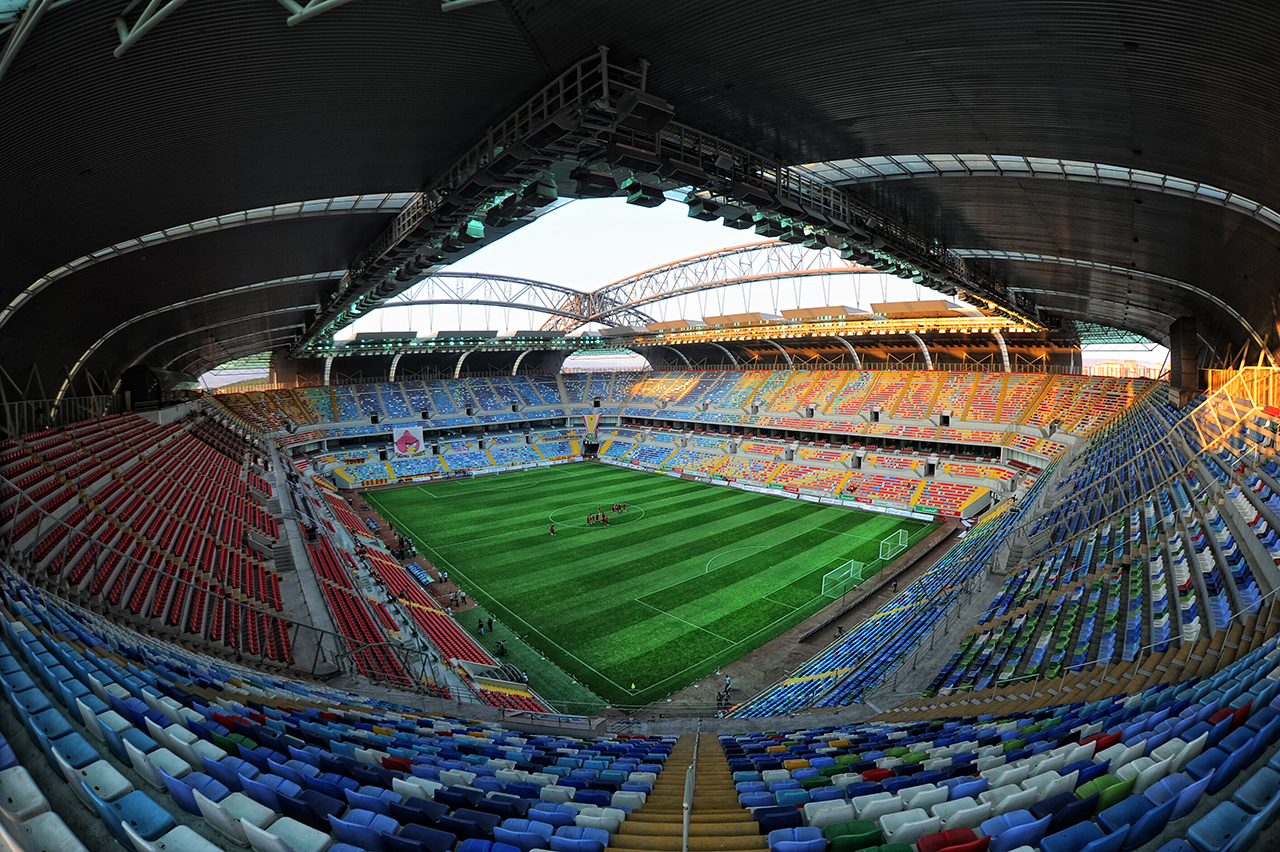
- UEFA

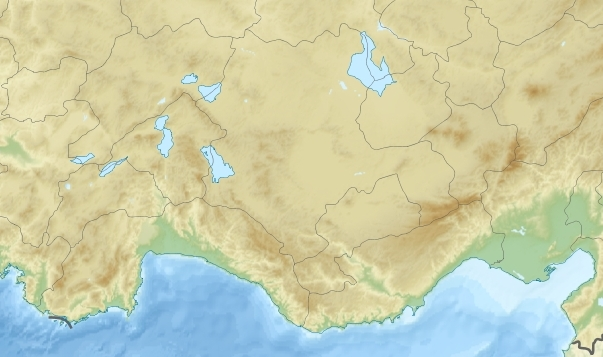
- Location in Southwestern Turkey Location in Turkey
- Full name: Kadir Has Stadyumu
- Location: Kayseri, Turkey
- Coordinates: 38°44′14″N 35°25′23″E
- Owner: Kayseri Metropolitan Municipality
- Capacity: 32,856
- Executive suites: 52
- Surface: Grass
- Record attendance: 32,013 (Kayserispor-Beşiktaş, 10 December 2017)
- Field size: 105 × 68 m

Construction
- Opened: 8 March 2009
- Cost: ₺ 68 million (approx. € 28 million)
- Architect: Ofiss Mimarca

Tenant
- Kayserispor (2009–present)

The Kadir Has Stadium (Turkish: Kadir Has Stadyumu), also referred to as RHG Enertürk Enerji Stadium for sponsorship reasons, is a multi-purpose stadium in Kayseri, Turkey. It is part of a complex of sports venues that are on the outskirts of the city, as part of the Atatürk Sports Complex. It replaced the ageing Kayseri Atatürk Stadium, which had been in use since the early 1960s.

It was opened with the Kayserispor match against Fenerbahçe on 8 March 2009. It is primary used for football matches and hosts the homes matches of Kayserispor and Kayseri Erciyesspor. The stadium has a capacity of 32,864 people (all-seated) and is totally covered.

The Kadir Has Stadyumu is one of the most modern stadiums in Turkey, and offers a number of restaurants, cafes, and VIP areas for fans. Two brand-new shopping centres will also be located nearby, as will a car park with a capacity of 1785 cars.

The light rail system of Kayseri, Kayseray, passes close to the stadium complex, allowing travelling supporters to reach the new site with ease.

The stadium hosted its first international match when Turkey played Estonia in a 2010 World Cup Qualifier on September 5, 2009. Kadir Has Stadium is one of the 8 host stadiums of the 2013 FIFA U-20 World Cup, The stadium hosted the opening ceremony followed by the opening match between Cuba versus the Republic of Korea.

== Renovation ==
For 2013 FIFA U-20 World Cup the Kayseri Kadir Has Stadium was renovated to meet regulations and requirements of UEFA. The c-values have been improved to a minimum c=90 for all seats. Furthermore, the VIP hospitality area has been extended, media facilities have been brought up to date, and public restroom facilities improved.

== See also ==
- Kadir Has Spor Salonu
