= Nurettin Korkmaz =

Turkish footballer (born 2002)

Personal information
- Date of birth: 27 June 2002 (age 24)
- Place of birth: Kocasinan, Turkey
- Height: 1.72 m (5 ft 8 in)
- Position: Winger

Team information
- Current team: Boluspor
- Number: 77

Youth career
- 2013: Kocasinan Şimşekspor
- 2013–2019: Kayserispor

Senior career*
Years	Team	Apps	(Gls)
2019–2026	Kayserispor	33	(0)
2022	→ Trofense (loan)	4	(0)
2023	→ İnegölspor (loan)	4	(0)
2024	→ İskenderunspor (loan)	6	(0)
2026–	Boluspor	4	(0)

International career^{‡}
2019	Turkey U18	4	(0)
- * Club domestic league appearances and goals as of 18 October 2026 ‡ National team caps and goals as of 14 October 2019

Nurettin Korkmaz (born 27 June 2002) is a Turkish professional footballer who plays as a winger for TFF 1. Lig club Boluspor.

== Professional career ==
On 23 February 2019, Korkmaz signed a 2.5 year contract with his youth club Kayserispor. Korkmaz made his professional debut for Kayserispor in a 2-2 Süper Lig away game against Akhisarspor on 19 May 2019. He made his Turkey U18 debut against Lithuania U18.
