= Yaw Ackah =

Ghanaian footballer (born 1999)

Personal information
- Full name: Yaw Ackah
- Date of birth: June 1, 1999 (age 27)
- Place of birth: Accra, Ghana
- Height: 1.69 m (5 ft 7 in)
- Position: Midfielder

Team information
- Current team: Ironi Kiryat Shmona
- Number: 79

Youth career
- Bechem United
- 2017–2019: Boavista

Senior career*
Years	Team	Apps	(Gls)
2019–2020	Boavista	26	(0)
2020–2026	Kayserispor	71	(0)
2021	→ Erzurumspor F.K. (loan)	2	(0)
2021–2022	→ Ankara Keçiörengücü S.K. (loan)	25	(0)
2026–	Ironi Kiryat Shmona	12	(0)

International career
2019–	Ghana U20	1	(0)
- * Club domestic league appearances and goals as of 17 June 2026

Yaw Ackah (born 1 June 1999) is a Ghanaian professional footballer who plays as a midfielder for Israeli club Ironi Kiryat Shmona.

== Professional career ==
Ackah joined the youth academy of Boavista in 2017 from Bechem United. Ackah made his professional debut for Boavista in a 4-2 Primeira Liga win over S.C. Braga on 11 May 2019.

After making 24 appearances for Boavista in the 2019/20 campaign, Ackah joined Turkish Super League side Kayserispor for a three-year deal with the club after a successful medical ahead of the 2020–2021 season.

== International career ==
Ackah was called up to the preliminary squad for the Ghana U20s for the 2019 U-20 Africa Cup of Nations.
