= Anthony Uzodimma =

Nigerian footballer (born 1999)

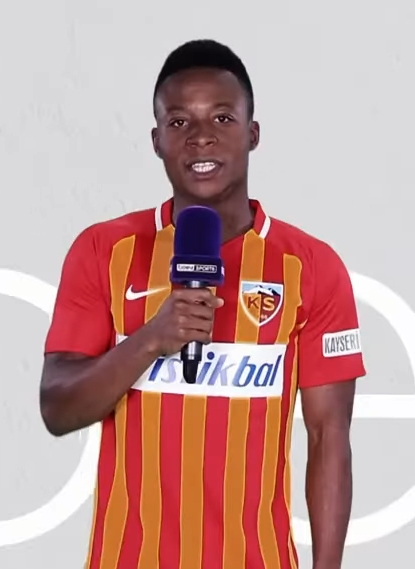
- Uzodimma in 2021

Personal information
- Full name: Anthony Chigaemezu Uzodimma
- Date of birth: 17 April 1999 (age 27)
- Place of birth: Eziala, Nigeria
- Height: 1.76 m (5 ft 9 in)
- Position: Midfielder

Team information
- Current team: Yeniboğaziçi
- Number: 80

Senior career*
Years	Team	Apps	(Gls)
2019–2025	Kayserispor	36	(2)
2020–2021	→ Giresunspor (loan)	28	(2)
2022	→ Keçiörengücü (loan)	17	(3)
2025–	Yeniboğaziçi		
- * Club domestic league appearances and goals as of 16 June 2025

Anthony Chigaemezu Uzodimma (born 17 April 1999) is a Nigerian footballer who plays as a midfielder for Turkish Cypriot club Yeniboğaziçi.

== Professional career ==
On 23 August 2019, Uzodimma signed a professional contract with Kayserispor. Uzodimma made his professional debut with Kayserispor in a 2–0 Turkish Cup loss to Fenerbahçe on 21 January 2020.
