= 2017–18 Esteghlal F.C. season =

Esteghlal F.C.
2017–18 season
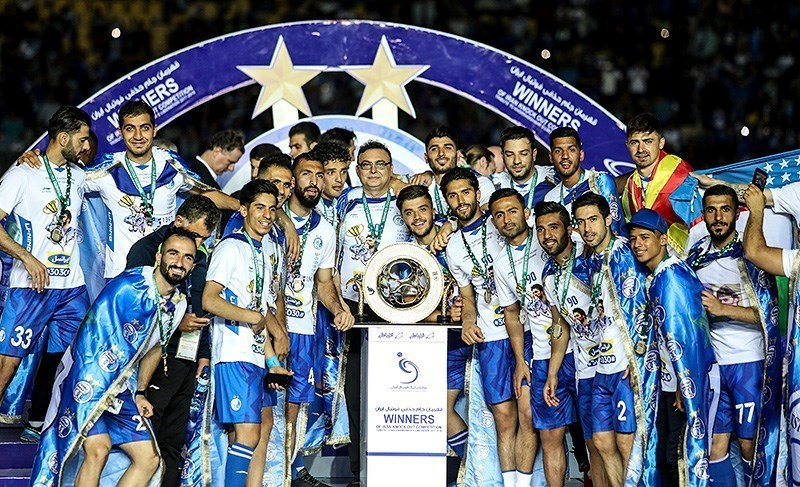
- President: Amir hosein fat’hi
- Head coach: Winfried Schäfer
- Stadium: Azadi Stadium
- Iran Pro League: 3rd
- Hazfi Cup: Winners
- AFC Champions League: Round of 16
- Top goalscorer: League: Ali Ghorbani (7); All: Mame Thiam (12)
- Highest home attendance: 85,000
- Lowest home attendance: 0
- Average home league attendance: 27,200
Home colours	Away colours	Third colours

The 2017–18 season is Esteghlal Football Club's 72nd season in existence and the club's 17th consecutive season in the top division of Iranian football. It covers a period from 1 July 2017 to 30 June 2018.

== Players ==
=== Squad information ===
Players and squad numbers last updated on 8 July 2017.

No.	Name	Nat.	Position(s)	Date of Birth (Age)	Signed in	Contract until	Signed from	Notes
Goalkeepers
1	Mehdi Rahmati	(Iran)	GK	2 February 1983 (aged 34)	2015	2019	(Iran) Paykan	Captain
19	Arshia Babazadeh ^{U23}	(Iran)	GK	5 November 1995 (aged 22)	2016	2022	(United States) De Anza Force	
22	Hossein Hosseini	(Iran)	GK	30 June 1992 (aged 25)	2012	2019	Youth system	
Defenders
2	Khosro Heydari	(Iran)	RB / RM / RW	14 September 1983 (aged 34)	2011	2019	(Iran) Sepahan	Vice-captain
4	Roozbeh Cheshmi	(Iran)	DM / CB / CM	24 July 1993 (aged 24)	2015	2019	(Iran) Saba Qom	
5	Majid Hosseini ^{U23}	(Iran)	CB / DM	20 June 1996 (aged 21)	2014	2019	Youth system	
13	Armin Sohrabian ^{U23}	(Iran)	LB / CB	26 July 1995 (aged 22)	2017	2019	(Iran) Sepahan	
18	Milad Zakipour ^{U23}	(Iran)	LB / LM	23 November 1995 (aged 22)	2016	2021	(Iran) Naft Tehran	
21	Vouria Ghafouri	(Iran)	RB / RM	20 September 1987 (aged 30)	2016	2018	(Iran) Sepahan	
33	Pejman Montazeri	(Iran)	CB / RB	6 September 1983 (aged 34)	2017	2019	(Qatar) Al Ahli	
90	Leandro Padovani Celin	(Brazil)	CB	21 December 1983 (aged 34)	2016	2018	(Iran) Sepahan	
Midfielders
6	Omid Ebrahimi	(Iran)	DM / CM	15 September 1987 (aged 30)	2014	2018	(Iran) Sepahan	
14	Farshid Bagheri	(Iran)	DM / CB / CM	5 June 1992 (aged 25)	2016	2018	(Iran) Saba Qom	
16	Mehdi Ghaedi ^{U21}	(Iran)	LW / RW	5 December 1998 (aged 19)	2017	2020	(Iran) Iranjavan	
20	Server Djeparov	(Uzbekistan)	AM / CM / LM	3 October 1982 (aged 35)	2017	2018	(Uzbekistan) Lokomotiv Tashkent	
23	Dariush Shojaeian	(Iran)	RW / LW / AM	7 April 1992 (aged 25)	2017	2020	(Iran) Gostaresh Foulad	
24	Omid Noorafkan ^{U21}	(Iran)	DM / LB / LW	9 April 1997 (aged 20)	2015	2019	Youth system	
28	Mohsen Karimi	(Iran)	LW / RW	20 September 1994 (aged 23)	2014	2020	Youth system	
77	Behnam Barzay	(Iran)	RW / LW	11 February 1993 (aged 24)	2015	2020	(Iran) Rah Ahan	
80	Bojan Najdenov	(North Macedonia)	CM	27 August 1991 (aged 26)	2018	2019	(Egypt) Smouha	
88	Farshid Esmaeili	(Iran)	AM / LW / SS	23 February 1994 (aged 23)	2015	2020	(Iran) Fajr Sepasi	
Forwards
9	Ali Ghorbani	(Iran)	CF / LW / RW	18 September 1990 (aged 27)	2016	2018	(Iran) Naft Tehran	
11	Jaber Ansari	(Iran)	SS / LW	10 January 1987 (aged 30)	2015	2019	(Iran) Gostaresh Foulad	
25	Mame Baba Thiam	(Senegal)	CF	9 October 1992 (aged 25)	2018	2019	(Italy) Juventus	
Players transferred during the season
30	Azim Gök ^{U23}	(Iran)	CB	25 January 1996 (aged 21)	2016	2019	Youth system	
17	Yaghoub Karimi	(Iran)	LB / LM	31 August 1991 (aged 26)	2014	2018	(Iran) Sepahan	
8	Mojtaba Jabbari	(Iran)	AM	16 June 1983 (aged 34)	2017	2019	(Qatar) Al Ahli	
7	Hassan Beyt Saeed	(Iran)	LW / CF / RW	1 April 1990 (aged 27)	2017	2019	(Iran) Esteghlal Khuzestan	
10	Sajjad Shahbazzadeh	(Iran)	CF	23 January 1990 (aged 27)	2017	2018	(Iran) Naft Tehran	

=== Persian Gulf League Squad ===
Note: Flags indicate national team as defined under FIFA eligibility rules; some limited exceptions apply. Players may hold more than one non-FIFA nationality.

No.	Pos.	Nation	Player
1‌	GK	IRI	Mehdi Rahmati (Captain)
2	DF	IRI	Khosro Heydari (Vice-captain)
4	MF	IRI	Roozbeh Cheshmi
5	DF	IRI	Majid Hosseini
6	MF	IRI	Omid Ebrahimi (3rd-captain)
9	FW	IRI	Ali Ghorbani
11	FW	IRI	Jaber Ansari
13	DF	IRI	Armin Sohrabian
14	MF	IRI	Farshid Bagheri
16	MF	IRI	Mehdi Ghaedi
18	DF	IRI	Milad Zakipour
19	GK	IRI	Arshia Babazadeh
20	MF	UZB	Server Djeparov

No.	Pos.	Nation	Player
21	DF	IRI	Vouria Ghafouri
22	GK	IRI	Hossein Hosseini
23	MF	IRI	Dariush Shojaeian
24	MF	IRI	Omid Noorafkan
25	FW	SEN	Mame Thiam
28	MF	IRI	Mohsen Karimi
33	DF	IRI	Pejman Montazeri
70	FW	IRI	Mohammad Javad Mohammadi
77	MF	IRI	Behnam Barzay
80	MF	MKD	Bojan Najdenov
88	MF	IRI	Farshid Esmaeili
90	DF	BRA	Padovani

=== AFC Champions League Squad ===
Note: Flags indicate national team as defined under FIFA eligibility rules; some limited exceptions apply. Players may hold more than one non-FIFA nationality.

No.	Pos.	Nation	Player
1‌	GK	IRI	Mehdi Rahmati (Captain)
2	DF	IRI	Khosro Heydari (Vice-captain)
4	MF	IRI	Roozbeh Cheshmi
5	DF	IRI	Majid Hosseini
6	MF	IRI	Omid Ebrahimi (3rd-captain)
7	FW	SEN	Mame Thiam
8	MF	IRI	Farshid Esmaeili
9	FW	IRI	Ali Ghorbani
10	MF	MKD	Bojan Najdenov
11	FW	IRI	Jaber Ansari
13	DF	IRI	Armin Sohrabian
14	MF	IRI	Farshid Bagheri
16	MF	IRI	Mehdi Ghaedi

No.	Pos.	Nation	Player
18	DF	IRI	Milad Zakipour
19	GK	IRI	Arshia Babazadeh
20	MF	UZB	Server Djeparov
21	DF	IRI	Vouria Ghafouri
22	GK	IRI	Hossein Hosseini
23	MF	IRI	Dariush Shojaeian
24	MF	IRI	Omid Noorafkan
28	MF	IRI	Mohsen Karimi
33	DF	IRI	Pejman Montazeri
70	FW	IRI	Mohammad Javad Mohammadi
77	MF	IRI	Behnam Barzay
90	DF	BRA	Padovani

== Transfers ==
=== In ===
No.	Pos.	Nat.	Name	Age	Moving from	Type	Transfer window	Ends	Source
16	LM	(Iran)	Mehdi Ghaedi	18	Iranjavan	Transfer	Summer	2020	
26	CF	(Iran)	Fardin Najafi	19	Esteghlal Academy	Promotion	Summer	2020	
27	AM	(Iran)	Hossein Heydari	18	Esteghlal Academy	Promotion	Summer	2022	
7	LW	(Iran)	Hassan Beyt Saeed	27	Esteghlal Khuzestan	Transfer	Summer	2019	
10	CF	(Iran)	Sajjad Shahbazzadeh	27	Naft Tehran	Transfer	Summer	2018	
23	AM	(Iran)	Dariush Shojaeian	25	Gostaresh Foulad	Transfer	Summer	2020	
32	DM	(Iran)	Sina Khadempour	20	Naft Tehran	Transfer	Summer	2022	
33	CB	(Iran)	Pejman Montazeri	33	(Qatar) Al Ahli	Transfer	Summer	2019	
70	RW	(Iran)	Mohammad Javad Mohammadi	21	Haf Semnan	Transfer	Summer	2022	
13	LB	(Iran)	Armin Sohrabian	21	Sepahan	Transfer	Summer	2019	
8	AM	(Iran)	Mojtaba Jabari	34	(Qatar) Al Ahli	Transfer	Summer	2019	
77	LW	(Iran)	Sajjad Aghaei	18	Persepolis Academy	Transfer	Summer	2022	
20	AM	(Uzbekistan)	Server Djeparov	34	Sepahan	End of loan	Summer	2018	
77	RW	(Iran)	Behnam Barzay	24	Unattached	Transfer	Winter	2020	
80	CM	(North Macedonia)	Bojan Najdenov	26	(Egypt) Smouha	Transfer	Winter	2019	
25	CF	(Senegal)	Mame Thiam	26	(Italy) Juventus	Transfer	Winter	2019	

=== Out ===
No.	Pos.	Nat.	Name	Age	Moving to	Type	Transfer window	Source
5	CB	(Iran)	Hossein Kanaanizadegan	23	Saipa	Released	Summer	
20	CB	(Iran)	Taha Shariati	17	Saipa	Transfer	Summer	
31	CB	(Iran)	Alireza Sayyar	23	Unattached	Released	Summer	
27	DM	(Iran)	Hossein Abarghouei	20	Gostaresh Foulad	Transfer	Summer	
13	LW	(Iran)	Miad Yazdani	24	Sepidrood Rasht	Loan	Summer	
9	CF	(Iran)	Kaveh Rezaei	25	(Belgium) Charleroi	End of contract	Summer	
74	AM	(Iran)	Mojtaba Haghdoust	21	Naft Tehran	End of loan	Summer	
3	CB	(Brazil)	Róbson Januário de Paula	23	(Brazil) Bahia	End of loan	Summer	
77	RW	(Iran)	Behnam Barzay	24	Sanat Naft Abadan	End of contract	Summer	
12	LB	(Iran)	Mohammad Reza Hashemi	20	Shemushack	Transfer	Summer	
	GK	(Iran)	Mehrdad Lashni	19	Mes Rafsanjan	Transfer	Summer	
32	DM	(Iran)	Sina Khadempour	20	Naft Tehran	Loan	Summer	
77	LW	(Iran)	Sajjad Aghaei	18	Aluminium Arak	Loan	Summer	
7	LW	(Iran)	Hassan Beyt Saeed	27	Foolad	Transfer	Winter	
30	CB	(Iran)	Azim Gök	21	Malavan	Loan	Winter	
17	LM	(Iran)	Yaghoub Karimi	26	Esteghlal Khuzestan	Transfer	Winter	
8	AM	(Iran)	Mojtaba Jabari	34	Unattached	Released	Winter	
10	CF	(Iran)	Sajjad Shahbazzadeh	27	Qatar	Transfer	Winter	
15	CB	(Armenia)	Hrayr Mkoyan	31	(Armenia) Shirak	Transfer	Winter	

== Pre-season and friendlies ==
1 July 2017 1	Esteghlal	1–0	Nassaji	Tehran, Iran
18:30 IRDT (UTC+04:30)	H. Beyt Saeed	Report

10 July 2017 2	Esteghlal	2–0	Pars Jonoubi	Yerevan, Armenia
18:30 AMT (UTC+04:00)	S. Shahbazzadeh 68'; A. Ghorbani 83'	Report		Stadium: Yerevan Football Academy; Attendance: 400

15 July 2017 3	Ararat (Armenia)	1–2	(Iran) Esteghlal	Yerevan, Armenia
18:30 AMT (UTC+04:00)	88'	Report	A. Ghorbani 20', 42'	Stadium: Yerevan Football Academy; Attendance: 200

22 July 2017 4	Esteghlal	1–1	Baadraan	Tehran, Iran
18:00 IRDT (UTC+04:30)	Jaber Ansari 57'	Report	Saeed Vasei 43'	Stadium: Azadi Stadium; Attendance: 0

== Competitions ==
=== Overview ===
Competition	First match	Last match	Starting round	Final position	Record							
Competition	First match	Last match	Starting round	Final position	Pld	W	D	L	GF	GA	GD	Win %
Pro League	28 July 2017	27 April 2018	—	3rd	30	15	9	6	43	18	+25	50.00
Hazfi Cup	8 September 2017	3 May 2018	Round of 32	Winners	5	5	0	0	10	3	+7	100.00
AFC Champions League	30 January 2018	15 May 2018	Group stage	Round of 16	8	4	3	1	12	7	+5	50.00
Total					43	24	12	7	65	28	+37	55.81

Last updated: 16 May 2018.
Source: Competitions

=== Iran Pro League ===
==== Standings ====
Pos	Team	Pld	W	D	L	GF	GA	GD	Pts	Qualification or relegation
1	Persepolis (C)	30	19	7	4	48	15	+33	64	Qualification for the 2019 AFC Champions League group stage
2	Zob Ahan	30	15	10	5	46	30	+16	55	Qualification for the 2019 AFC Champions League qualifying play-offs
3	Esteghlal	30	15	9	6	43	18	+25	54	Qualification for 2019 AFC Champions League group stage (Note: Esteghlal qualified to AFC Champions League group stage directly by winning the Hazfi Cup)
4	Saipa	30	15	9	6	40	34	+6	54	Qualification for the 2019 AFC Champions League qualifying play-offs
5	Pars Jonoubi Jam	30	11	14	5	34	24	+10	47	

Updated to match(es) played on April 13, 2018. Source: IPL Stats, Soccerway
Rules for classification: 1) Points; 2) Goal difference; 3) Goals scored.
(C) Champions

==== Results summary ====
Overall								Home						Away					
Pld	W	D	L	GF	GA	GD	Pts	W	D	L	GF	GA	GD	W	D	L	GF	GA	GD
30	15	9	6	43	18	+25	54	10	4	1	29	7	+22	5	5	5	14	11	+3

Last updated: 3 May 2018.
Source: Ipl Stats

==== Results by round ====
Round	1	2	3	4	5	6	7	8	9	10	11	12	13	14	15	16	17	18	19	20	21	22	23	24	25	26	27	28	29	30
Ground	A	H	H	A	H	A	H	A	H	A	H	A	H	A	H	H	A	A	H	A	H	A	H	A	H	A	H	A	H	A
Result	L	D	W	L	L	L	D	W	D	L	W	D	W	D	W	W	W	D	D	D	W	L	W	W	W	W	W	D	W	W
Position	13	11	9	11	15	15	16	10	12	13	11	11	9	8	8	6	5	4	5	6	6	6	6	3	3	3	3	3	3	3

Updated to match(es) played on 26 January 2018. Source: "Ipl".
A = Away; H = Home; W = Win; D = Draw; L = Loss

==== Matches ====
Win Draw Loss Postponed

28 July 2017 1	Sanat Naft	1–0	Esteghlal	Abadan
21:00 IRDT (UTC+04:30)	J. Karrar 18'; M. Shadkam (yellow card) 41'	Report		Stadium: Takhti Abadan; Attendance: 10,000; Referee: Mouood Bonyadifar

4 August 2017 2	Esteghlal	0–0	Esteghlal Khuzestan	Tehran
21:00 IRDT (UTC+04:30)	M. Zakipour (yellow card) 91'; S. Shahbazzadeh (yellow card) 93'	Report	H. Bahrami (yellow card) 19'; A. Alaei (yellow card) 84'; Y. Delfi (yellow card) 86'	Stadium: Azadi Stadium; Attendance: 26,000; Referee: Vahid Kazemi

11 August 2017 3	Esteghlal	1–0	Tractor Sazi	Tehran
20:45 IRDT (UTC+04:30)	Djeparov 42'; Shojaeian (yellow card) 67'	Report	Taheran (yellow card) 41'	Stadium: Azadi Stadium; Attendance: 61,000; Referee: (Iran) Bijan Heydari; Man of the Match: Server Djeparov

17 August 2017 4	Saipa	1–0	Esteghlal	Tehran
20:45 IRDT (UTC+04:30)	Abbaszadeh 58' (pen.) (yellow card) 58'; Shahalidoost (yellow card) 78' (yellow-red card); Akhbari (yellow card) 90+3'	Report	Rahmati (yellow card) 57'; Cheshmi (yellow card) 80'	Stadium: Takhti Stadium; Attendance: 27,000; Referee: (Iran) Mohammad Zahedifar; Man of the Match: Mohammad Abbaszadeh

22 August 2017 5	Esteghlal	0–2	Padideh	Tehran
18:00 IRDT (UTC+04:30)	H. Beyt Saeed (yellow card) 41'	Report	Mohammad Ghazi 15'; Hossein Mehraban 72'	Stadium: Azadi Stadium; Attendance: 18,000; Referee: Alireza Faghani; Man of the Match: Mohammad Ghazi

15 September 2017 6	Pars Jonoubi Jam	2–0	Esteghlal	Jam
20:00 IRDT (UTC+04:30)	Ali Dashti 38'; Farshad Salarvand 90+6'	Report	Roozbeh Cheshmi (yellow card) 33'; F. Bagheri (yellow card) 85'; H. Hosseini (yellow card) 90'	Stadium: Takhti Stadium; Attendance: 16,000; Referee: Mohammad Seyed Ali; Man of the Match: Ali Dashti

20 September 2017 7	Esteghlal	1–1	Zob Ahan	Tehran
20:00 IRDT (UTC+04:30)	Cheshmi 12' (yellow card) 93'; Padovani (yellow card) 90'	Report	NejadMehdi 78'	Stadium: Azadi Stadium; Attendance: 22,000; Referee: Payam Heydari

26 September 2017 8	Sepidrood	1–2	Esteghlal	Rasht
16:15 IRST (UTC+03:30)	ebrahimi 86' (pen.)		Jaber Ansari 53'; Majid Hosseini (yellow card) 54'; Dariush Shojaeian 68'; Heydari (yellow card) 84'	Stadium: Sardar Jangal stadium Attendance: 6,000

13 October 2017 9	Esteghlal	0–0	Foolad	Tehran
17:00 IRST (UTC+03:30)	Cheshmi (yellow card) 95'	Report		Stadium: Azadi Stadium; Attendance: 30,000

20 October 2017 10	Persepolis	1–0	Esteghlal	Tehran
15:00 IRST (UTC+03:30)	A. Alipour 23' (pen.)		Cheshmi (yellow card) 22'; Farshid Bagheri (yellow card) 50'; Omid Ebrahimi (yellow card) 59'; Vouria Ghafouri (yellow card) 87'; Milad Zakipour (yellow card) 89'; Farshid Esmaeili (yellow card) 96'; Dariush Shojaeian (yellow card) 96'	Stadium: Azadi Stadium; Attendance: 85,000

31 October 2017 11	Esteghlal	2–0	Naft Tehran	Tehran
17:45 IRST (UTC+03:30)	Mohammadizadeh 56' (og.); Farshid Bagheri (yellow card) 62'} J. Ansari 66'			Stadium: Azadi Stadium; Attendance: 18,000

15 November 2017 12	Siah Jamegan	0–0	Esteghlal	Mashhad
14:45 IRST (UTC+03:30)	Amraei (yellow card) 76'; Badamaki (yellow card) 77'; Seifollahi (yellow card) 82'; Malekian (yellow card) 82'	Report	Esmaeili (yellow card) 18'; Djeparov (yellow card) 49'; Ghaedi (yellow card) 84'	Stadium: Samen Stadium; Attendance: 30,000; Referee: (Iran) Mehdi Seyedali

25 November 2017 13	Esteghlal	2–0	Gostaresh	Tehran
17:30 IRST (UTC+03:30)	F. Esmaeili 63', 86'			Stadium: Azadi Stadium; Attendance: N/C

30 November 2017 14	Paykan	0–0	Esteghlal	Shahr-e Qods
15:00 IRST (UTC+03:30)				Stadium: Shahr-e Qods Stadium

6 December 2017 15	Esteghlal	3–0	Sepahan	Tehran
17:30 IRST (UTC+03:30)	A. Ghorbani 4'; S. Djeparov 36', 47'			Stadium: Azadi Stadium; Attendance: 25,000

22 December 2017 16	Esteghlal	4–0	Sanat Naft	Tehran
17:30 IRST (UTC+03:30)	M. Karimi 15', 42', 67'; D. Shojaeian 55'} Milad Zakipour (yellow card) 63'			Stadium: Azadi Stadium; Attendance: 15,000

28 December 2017 17	Esteghlal Khuzestan	0–3	Esteghlal	Ahvaz
16:25 IRST (UTC+03:30)			V. Ghafouri 7'; M. Karimi (yellow card) 61'; O.G 48'; Djeparov (yellow card) 61'; R. Cheshmi (yellow card) 15', (goal) 73'	Stadium: Ghadir Stadium

5 January 2018 18	Tractor Sazi	0–0	Esteghlal	Tabriz
14:30 IRST (UTC+03:30)				Stadium: Yadegar-e Emam Stadium; Attendance: 38,000

12 January 2018 19	Esteghlal	1–1	Saipa	Tehran
16:35 IRST (UTC+03:30)	D. Shojaeian 23'; F. Bagheri (yellow card) 50'; Noorafkan (yellow card) 71'			Stadium: Azadi Stadium; Attendance: 33,000

19 January 2018 20	Padideh	0–0	Esteghlal	Mashhad
15:00 IRST (UTC+03:30)			M. Hosseini (yellow card) 74'; B. Barzay (yellow card) 83'; Ali Ghorbani (yellow card) 89'	Stadium: Samen Stadium; Attendance: 35,000

25 January 2018 21	Esteghlal	4–0	Pars Jonoubi Jam	Tehran
16:50 IRST (UTC+03:30)	S. Djebarov 4'; B. Barzay 31'; A. Ghorbani (yellow card) 34', (goal) 48', 65'; Noorafkan (yellow card) 41'			Stadium: Azadi Stadium; Attendance: 24,000

4 February 2018 22	Zob Ahan	2–1	Esteghlal	Isfahan
17:00 IRST (UTC+03:30)			V. Ghafouri 31'; M. Hosseini (yellow card) 59'; B. Barzay (yellow card) 67'; Cheshmi (yellow card) 85'; Shojaeian (yellow card) 87'	Stadium: Foolad Shahr

8 February 2018 23	Esteghlal	3–0	Sepidrood	Tehran
18:15 IRST (UTC+03:30)	F. Esmaeili 14'; O. Ebrahimi 64'; J. Ansari (yellow card) 42', (goal) 77'			Stadium: Azadi Stadium

24 February 2018 24	Foolad	1–4	Esteghlal	Ahvaz
16:00 IRST (UTC+03:30)	Rahim Zahivi 12'		M. Thiam 2', 90+2'; R. Cheshmi 7', (yellow card) 38'; D. Shojaeian 17'; Hossein Hosseini (yellow card) 83'	Stadium: Ghadir Stadium

1 March 2018 25	Esteghlal	1–0	Persepolis	Tehran
15:45 IRST (UTC+03:30)	V. Ghafouri 43', (yellow card) 52'; Thiam (yellow card) 45'; Farshid Esmaeili (yellow card) 54'; Djeparov (yellow card) 77'	Report		Stadium: Azadi Stadium

28 March 2018 26	Naft Tehran	1–2	Esteghlal	Tehran
18:45 IRDT (UTC+04:30)	Mohsen Bengar 37'	Report	J. Ansari 75'; O. Noorafkan 88', (yellow card) 88'	Stadium: Takhti Stadium; Referee: Seyed Mehdi Seyed Ali; Man of the Match: Omid Noorafkan

6 April 2018 27	Esteghlal	4–1	Siah Jamegan	Tehran
18:55 IRDT (UTC+04:30)	F.Esmaeili 50', 84'; A. Ghorbani 67', 76'	Report	Ali Asgari 80'	Stadium: Azadi Stadium; Attendance: 15,000; Referee: Hossein Zargar; Man of the Match: Farshid Esmaeili

11 April 2018 28	Gostaresh	1–1	Esteghlal	Tabriz
17:30 IRDT (UTC+04:30)	Reza Khaleghifar 57'	Report	A. Ghorbani 11'	Stadium: Bonyan Diesel; Attendance: 1000; Man of the Match: A. Ghorbani 67'

22 April 2018 29	Esteghlal	3–2	Paykan	Tehran
18:00 IRDT (UTC+04:30)	M.Thiam 49' (yellow card) 34'; V. Ghafouri 54'; D. Shojaeian (red card); O. Ebrahimi 90'	Report		Stadium: Azadi Stadium; Attendance: 10,000; Referee: Ashkan Khorshidi; Man of the Match: M.Thiam

27 April 2018 30	Sepahan	0–1	Esteghlal	Isfahan
18:00 IRDT (UTC+04:30)		Report	M.Thiam 11'; O.Noorafkan (yellow card) 64'	Stadium: Naghsh-e Jahan Stadium; Attendance: 35,000; Referee: Mohammadreza Akbarian; Man of the Match: M.Thiam

=== Hazfi Cup ===
8 September 2017 Round of 32	Gol Gohar	1–2	Esteghlal	Sirjan
17:45 DST+04:30	M. Gholami 76' (pen.)	Report	O. Noorafkan 56'; K. Heydari 85'	Stadium: Gol Gohar; Attendance: 3,000; Referee: Hossein Zargar

20 October 2017 Round of 16	Esteghlal	2–1	Nassaji	Tehran
16:45 IRST (UTC+03:30)	F. Esmaeili 28'; A. Ghorbani 59'	Report	M. Ousani 71'	Stadium: Azadi Stadium; Referee: Mouood Bonyadifar

19 December 2017 Quarter Final	Esteghlal	3–0	Iranjavan Bushehr	Tehran
13:30 IRST (UTC+03:30)	M. Hosseini 45+4'; S. Djeparov 50'; A. Ghorbani 90+2'	Report		Stadium: Azadi Stadium; Attendance: 5,000; Referee: Reza Adel

30 January 2018 Semi-Final	Sanat Naft Abadan	1–2	Esteghlal	Abadan
14:45 IRST (UTC+03:30)	L. Pereira 61'	Report	P. Montazeri 8'; D. Shojaeian 44'	Stadium: Takhti Stadium; Referee: Alireza Faghani

3 May 2018 Final	Esteghlal	1–0	Khooneh be Khooneh	Khorramshahr
17.15 DST+04:30	Mame Thiam 35'	Report		Stadium: Khorramshahr Stadium; Attendance: 15,000; Referee: Hossein Zargar; Man of the Match: Mame Thiam

=== AFC Champions League ===
==== Group stage ====
Pos	Team	Pld	W	D	L	GF	GA	GD	Pts	Qualification
1	(Iran) Esteghlal	6	3	3	0	9	5	+4	12	Advance to knockout stage
2	(United Arab Emirates) Al-Ain	6	2	4	0	10	6	+4	10	Advance to knockout stage
3	(Qatar) Al-Rayyan	6	1	3	2	7	11	−4	6	
4	(Saudi Arabia) Al-Hilal	6	0	2	4	3	7	−4	2	

Source: AFC
Rules for classification: Group stage tiebreakers

13 February 2018	Al-Rayyan (Qatar)	2–2	(Iran) Esteghlal	Doha, Qatar
18:10 UTC+3	Hamdallah 18'; Tabata 28'	Report	Tabata 6' (o.g.); Ghorbani 88'	Stadium: Jassim Bin Hamad Stadium; Attendance: 5,038; Referee: Hettikamkanamge Perera (Sri Lanka)

20 February 2018	Esteghlal (Iran)	1–0	(Saudi Arabia) Al-Hilal	Muscat, Oman
19:30 UTC+4	Thiam 46'	Report		Stadium: Al-sib Stadium; Attendance: 4,175; Referee: Ryuji Sato (Japan)

6 March 2018	Al-Ain (United Arab Emirates)	2–2	(Iran) Esteghlal	Hazza bin Zayed Stadium, Al Ain
19:20 UTC+4	Berg 63'; Khalil 89' (pen.)	Report	Thiam 52', 77'	Attendance: 10,036; Referee: Mohd Amirul Izwan Yaacob (Malaysia)

12 March 2018	Esteghlal (Iran)	1–1	(United Arab Emirates) Al-Ain	Tehran, Iran
--:-- UTC+3:30	Thiam 42' (pen.)		Shiotani 78'	Stadium: Azadi Stadium; Attendance: 90000

2 April 2018	Esteghlal (Iran)	2–0	(Qatar) Al-Rayyan	Tehran, Iran
--:-- UTC+4:30	Server Djeparov 3'; Vouria Ghafouri 58' (pen.)			Stadium: Azadi Stadium

16 April 2018	Al-Hilal (Saudi Arabia)	0–1	(Iran) Esteghlal	Riyadh, Saudi Arabia
--:-- UTC+3		Report	Vouria Ghafouri 36'	Stadium: Prince Faisal bin Fahd Stadium; Attendance: 4500

==== Round of 16 ====
8 May 2018 First leg	Zob Ahan (Iran)	1–0	(Iran) Esteghlal	Esfahan, Iran
	Gvelesiani 92' (pen.)	Report		Stadium: Foolad Shahr Stadium; Attendance: 15,000

15 May 2018 Second leg	Esteghlal (Iran)	3–1 (3–2 agg.)	(Iran) Zob Ahan	Tehran, Iran
20:45 --:-- UTC+4:30	M. Thiam 11' (pen.), 41', 64'	Report	G. Hadadifar 65'	Stadium: Azadi Stadium; Attendance: 75,680; Referee: Ahmed Al-Kaf (Oman)

== Statistics ==
=== Appearances and goals ===
No.	Pos	Nat	Player	Total		Iran Pro League		Hazfi Cup		Champions League	
No.	Pos	Nat	Player	Apps	Goals	Apps	Goals	Apps	Goals	Apps	Goals
1	GK	(Iran) IRI	Mehdi Rahmati	18	0	10	0	4	0	4	0
2	DF	(Iran) IRI	Khosro Heydari	25	1	15	0	4	1	6	0
4	MF	(Iran) IRI	Roozbeh Cheshmi	38	3	26	3	5	0	7	0
5	DF	(Iran) IRI	Majid Hosseini	33	1	24	0	4	1	5	0
6	MF	(Iran) IRI	Omid Ebrahimi	33	2	23	2	4	0	6	0
9	FW	(Iran) IRI	Ali Ghorbani	40	9	27	6	5	2	8	1
11	FW	(Iran) IRI	Jaber Ansari	26	4	22	4	1	0	3	0
13	DF	(Iran) IRI	Armin Sohrabian	13	0	8	0	1	0	4	0
14	MF	(Iran) IRI	Farshid Bagheri	30	0	18	0	5	0	7	0
16	MF	(Iran) IRI	Mehdi Ghaedi	14	0	12	0	2	0	0	0
18	DF	(Iran) IRI	Milad Zakipour	25	0	21	0	2	0	2	0
20	MF	(Uzbekistan) UZB	Server Djeparov	39	6	26	4	5	1	8	1
21	DF	(Iran) IRI	Vouria Ghafouri	36	6	24	4	4	0	8	2
22	GK	(Iran) IRI	Hossein Hosseini	25	0	20	0	1	0	4	0
23	MF	(Iran) IRI	Dariush Shojaeian	33	5	24	4	3	1	6	0
24	MF	(Iran) IRI	Omid Noorafkan	34	2	24	1	4	1	6	0
25	FW	(Senegal) SEN	Mame Baba Thiam	13	12	6	4	1	1	6	7
27	MF	(Iran) IRI	Hossein Heydari	1	0	1	0	0	0	0	0
28	MF	(Iran) IRI	Mohsen Karimi	6	3	5	3	1	0	0	0
33	DF	(Iran) IRI	Pejman Montazeri	25	1	15	0	3	1	7	0
70	MF	(Iran) IRI	Mohammad Javad Mohammadi	1	0	0	0	1	0	0	0
77	MF	(Iran) IRI	Behnam Barzay	8	1	5	1	1	0	2	0
80	DF	(North Macedonia) MKD	Bojan Najdenov	5	0	4	0	0	0	1	0
88	MF	(Iran) IRI	Farshid Esmaeili	34	6	23	5	4	1	7	0
90	DF	(Brazil) BRA	Leandro Padovani	8	0	6	0	2	0	0	0
Players transferred out during the season
7	FW	(Iran) IRI	Hassan Beyt Saeed	10	0	9	0	1	0	0	0
8	MF	(Iran) IRI	Mojtaba Jabbari	4	0	4	0	0	0	0	0
10	FW	(Iran) IRI	Sajjad Shahbazzadeh	9	0	8	0	1	0	0	0
17	DF	(Iran) IRI	Yaghoub Karimi	4	0	4	0	0	0	0	0
30	DF	(Iran) IRI	Azim Gök	1	0	1	0	0	0	0	0

Last updated: 27 April 2018
Source: Competitions

=== Goalscorers ===
Rank	No.	Pos.	Nat.	Name	Pro League	Hazfi Cup	AFC CL	Total
1	25	FW	(Senegal)	Mame Baba Thiam	4	1	7	12
2	9	FW	(Iran)	Ali Ghorbani	7	2	1	10
3	88	CM	(Iran)	Farshid Esmaeili	5	1	0	6
3	20	CM	(Uzbekistan)	Server Djeparov	4	1	1	6
3	21	DF	(Iran)	Vouria Ghafouri	4	0	2	6
4	23	CM	(Iran)	Dariush Shojaeian	4	1	0	5
5	11	FW	(Iran)	Jaber Ansari	4	0	0	4
6	28	FW	(Iran)	Mohsen Karimi	3	0	0	3
6	4	MF	(Iran)	Roozbeh Cheshmi	3	0	0	3
7	6	MF	(Iran)	Omid Ebrahimi	2	0	0	2
7	24	MF	(Iran)	Omid Noorafkan	1	1	0	2
8	77	FW	(Iran)	Behnam Barzay	1	0	0	1
8	2	DF	(Iran)	Khosro Heydari	0	1	0	1
8	5	DF	(Iran)	Majid Hosseini	0	1	0	1
8	33	DF	(Iran)	Pejman Montazeri	0	1	0	1
Totals					42	10	11	63

Last updated: 16 May 2018

=== Clean sheets ===
Rank	Name	Pro League	Hazfi Cup	AFC CL	Total
1	(Iran) Hossein Hosseini	10	0	1	11
2	(Iran) Mehdi Rahmati	6	2	2	10
Total		16	2	3	21

=== Disciplinary record ===
Includes all competitive matches. Players with 1 card or more are included only.

N	P	Nat.	Name	Pro League			Hazfi Cup			AFC CL			Total			Notes
N	P	Nat.	Name	Yellow card	Second yellow card	Red card	Yellow card	Second yellow card	Red card	Yellow card	Second yellow card	Red card	Yellow card	Second yellow card	Red card	Notes
1	GK	(Iran)	Mehdi Rahmati	1			1			1			3			
4	MF	(Iran)	Roozbeh Cheshmi	8						2			10			
14	MF	(Iran)	Farshid Bagheri	4			1						5			
16	FW	(Iran)	Mehdi Ghaedi				1						1			
18	DF	(Iran)	Milad Zakipour	3			2						5			
23	MF	(Iran)	Dariush Shojaeian	4	1		1			1			6	1		
88	MF	(Iran)	Farshid Esmaeili							1			1			

Last updated: 7 August 2017
Source: Matches
Only competitive matches
(yellow card) = Number of bookings; (second yellow card) = Number of sending offs after a second yellow card; (red card) = Number of sending offs by a direct red card.
