= Dariush Shojaeian =

Iranian footballer

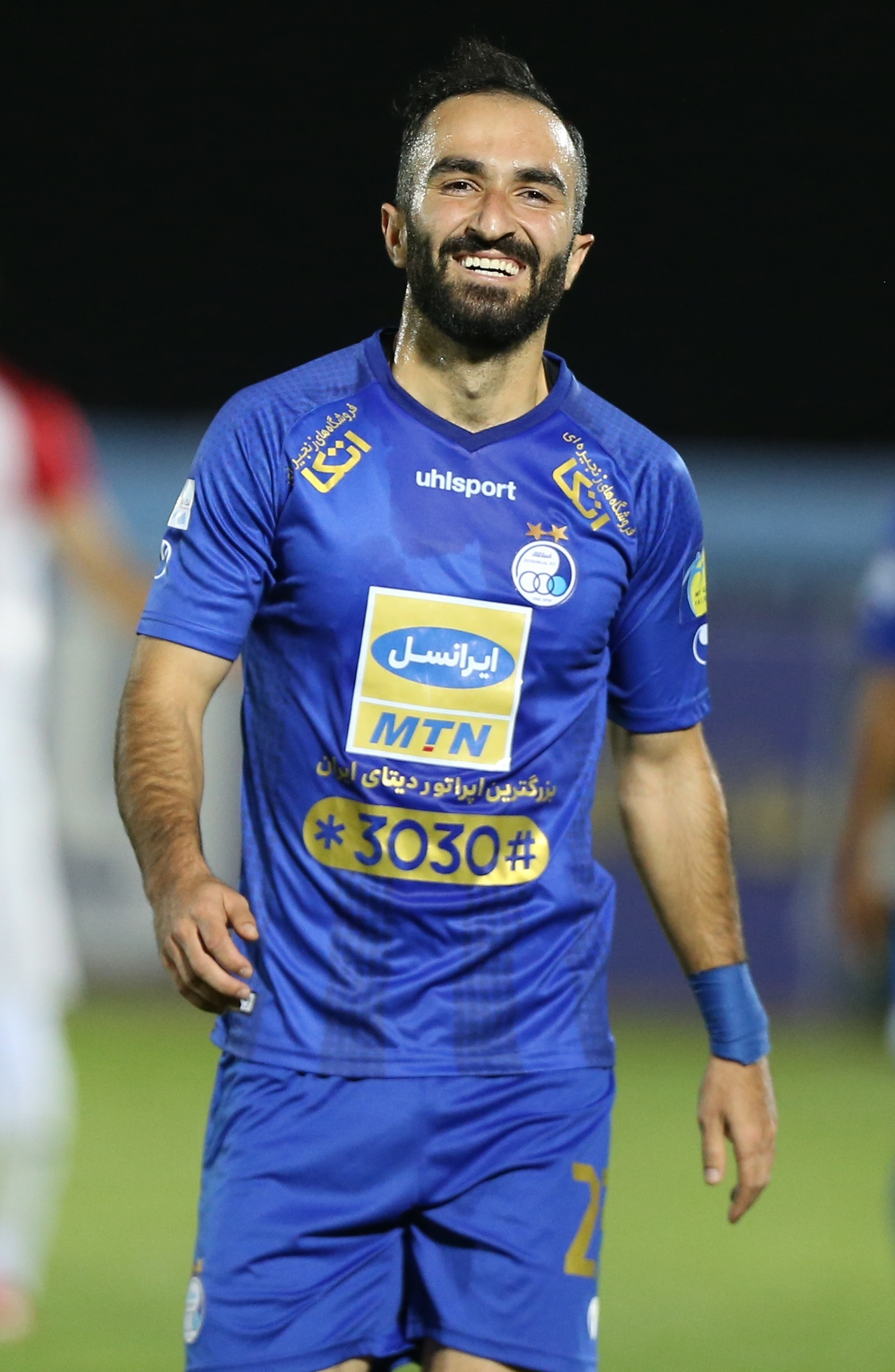
- Dariush with Esteghlal at AFC Champions League

Personal information
- Full name: Dariush Shojaeian
- Date of birth: 7 April 1992 (age 34)
- Place of birth: Shiraz, Iran
- Height: 1.78 m (5 ft 10 in)
- Position: Midfielder

Team information
- Current team: Havadar

Youth career
- 2002–2010: Fajr Sepasi

Senior career*
| Years | Team | Apps | (Gls) |
| 2010–2015 | Bahman Shiraz | 66 | (15) |
| 2015–2017 | Gostaresh Foolad | 58 | (7) |
| 2017–2021 | Esteghlal | 63 | (5) |
| 2021– | Havadar | 59 | (7) |

International career^{‡}
| 2016 | Iran | 3 | (0) |
- * Club domestic league appearances and goals as of 24 May 2021 ‡ National team caps and goals as of 26 November 2017

Dariush Shojaeian (Persian: داريوش شجاعيان, born 7 April 1992) is an Iranian professional footballer who currently plays as a midfielder for Persian Gulf Pro League club Havadar Since 2021.

Shojaeian made his debut for the Iran national football team in March 2016.

== Club career ==
=== Fajr Sepasi ===
Shojaeian started his professional career with Persian Gulf Pro League side Fajr Sepasi in 2009 after spending seven years in the club's youth academies. After not playing a game in the 2009–10 season he left the club and joined Bahman Shiraz in the 3rd Division.

=== Gostaresh Foolad ===
Shojaeian joined Gostaresh in 2015, after spending the previous season at Bahman Shiraz in the 2nd Division of Iranian Football. He scored his first goal for the club on 7 August 2015 in a 3–1 loss to Tractor Sazi. Shojaeian scored the winning goal for Gostaresh on 20 August 2015 in a 1–0 victory against Siah Jamegan.

=== Esteghlal ===
On 18 June 2017, Shojaeian joined Esteghlal on a three-year contract. The transfer fee was rumored to be around 15 billion Rials, which made Shojaeian the record signing in Iranian football. Shojaeian Decided to wear number 23 at Esteghlal.

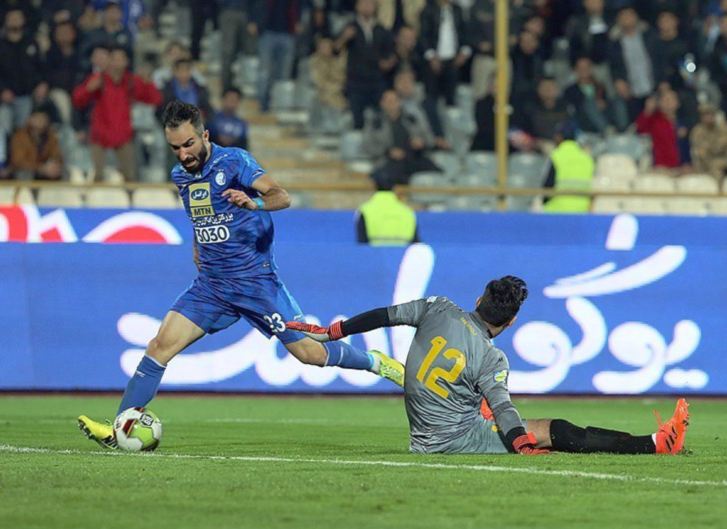
Shojaeian dribbling Sanat Naft's goalkeeper to score his goal in December 2017

On 10 July 2017 during Esteghlal's pre-season, Shojaeian played in a friendly against Pars Jonoubi Jam and managed to assist Sajjad Shahbazzadeh's goal. later, he was praised for his work and making good runs on the flank during the game. He made his official debut on 28 June 2017, in Esteghlal's opening match of the season, which they were defeated 1–0 by Sanat Naft. He scored his first goal for the club in a 2–1 victory over Sepidrood. On 25 December 2017, he was named man of the match for his performance against Sanat Naft. He assisted Mohsen Karimi's first goal. Then after 10 minutes into the second half, he received a pass by Ali Ghorbani which left him one on one against Sanat Naft's goalkeeper Soufiani; Shojaeian dribbled past him and scored on the empty goal. His goal was compared to Claudio Caniggia's goal against Brazil at the 1990 FIFA World Cup by Iranian media. He also scored another goal in a 2–1 victory against Sanat Naft in Hazfi Cup and helped his team to reach the final. After the game, he dedicated the victory to his teammate Mehdi Ghaedi who was injured in an accident a day before. On 13 February, Shojaeian made his AFC Champions League debut in a 2–2 group stage draw with Qatari club Al-Rayyan. On 8 May 2018,

Shojaeian injured a knee late in the first leg of AFC Champions League quarter-final against Zob Ahan on 8 May 2018. The injury, a ruptured anterior cruciate ligament of his right knee, meant he was ruled out for at least six months, so would miss the second leg match against Zob Ahan and the beginning of the following season as well as the 2018 FIFA World Cup.

== International career ==
Shojaeian made his debut for the Iran national football team against India on 24 March 2016 during the 2018 FIFA World Cup qualification. He assisted Alireza Jahanbakhsh's goal, as he scored Iran's forth in the match.

== Career statistics ==
=== Club ===
As of 24 May 2021

| Club | Season | League | | | Hazfi Cup | | Asia | | Total | |
| Club | Season | Division | Apps | Goals | Apps | Goals | Apps | Goals | Apps | Goals |
|---|---|---|---|---|---|---|---|---|---|---|
| Gostaresh Foulad | 2015–16 | Persian Gulf Pro League | 29 | 5 | 1 | 0 | — | | 30 | 5 |
| Gostaresh Foulad | 2016–17 | Persian Gulf Pro League | 29 | 2 | 1 | 0 | — | | 30 | 2 |
| Gostaresh Foulad | Total | | 58 | 7 | 2 | 0 | – | | 60 | 7 |
| Esteghlal | 2017–18 | Persian Gulf Pro League | 24 | 4 | 3 | 1 | 7 | 0 | 34 | 5 |
| Esteghlal | 2018–19 | Persian Gulf Pro League | 15 | 0 | 0 | 0 | 4 | 0 | 19 | 0 |
| Esteghlal | 2019–20 | Persian Gulf Pro League | 7 | 1 | 2 | 1 | 0 | 0 | 9 | 2 |
| Esteghlal | 2020–21 | Persian Gulf Pro League | 17 | 0 | 1 | 0 | 4 | 0 | 14 | 0 |
| Esteghlal | Total | | 63 | 5 | 6 | 2 | 15 | 0 | 84 | 7 |
| Havadar | 2021-22 | Persian Gulf Pro League | 18 | 1 | 0 | 0 | 0 | 0 | 18 | 1 |
| Havadar | 2022-23 | Persian Gulf Pro League | 20 | 2 | 2 | 0 | 0 | 0 | 22 | 2 |
| Havadar | 2023-24 | Persian Gulf Pro League | 19 | 4 | 1 | 0 | 0 | 0 | 20 | 4 |
| Havadar | Total | | 57 | 7 | 3 | 0 | 0 | 0 | 60 | 7 |
| Career Total | | | 178 | 19 | 11 | 2 | 15 | 0 | 204 | 21 |

=== International ===
As of 26 November 2017

Iran
| Year | Apps | Goals |
|---|---|---|
| 2016 | 3 | 0 |
| Total | 3 | 0 |

== Honours ==
Bahman Shiraz

- League 2 : 2014–15
- League 3 : 2012–13
- Fars Provincial League : 2010–11

Esteghlal

- Hazfi Cup: 2017–18
