= Server Djeparov =

Uzbek footballer (born 1982)

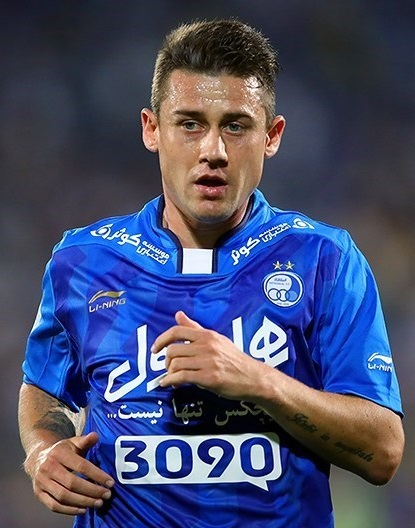
- Djeparov with Esteghlal in 2017

Personal information
- Full name: Server Reshatovich Djeparov
- Date of birth: 3 October 1982 (age 44)
- Place of birth: Chirchiq, Uzbek SSR, Soviet Union
- Height: 1.72 m (5 ft 8 in)
- Position: Midfielder

Team information
- Current team: Uzbekistan U-17 (head coach); Uzbekistan (assistant coach); Oqtepa (head coach)

Youth career
- 1997–2000: Navbahor Namangan

Senior career*
Years	Team	Apps	(Gls)
2000–2001	Navbahor Namangan	46	(7)
2001–2007	Pakhtakor Tashkent	96	(64)
2007–2010	Bunyodkor	46	(38)
2010	→ FC Seoul (loan)	16	(1)
2011	FC Seoul	15	(0)
2011–2013	Al-Shabab	25	(4)
2013–2014	Seongnam FC	55	(13)
2015	Ulsan Hyundai	22	(6)
2016–2017	Lokomotiv Tashkent	23	(7)
2017–2018	Esteghlal	27	(4)
2017	→ Sepahan (loan)	10	(1)
2018	Zhetysu	5	(1)
2019	Metallurg Bekabad	9	(2)
Total		395	(148)

International career
2002–2017	Uzbekistan	128	(25)

Managerial career
- 2020–: Uzbekistan U-17
- 2020–: Uzbekistan (assistant coach)
- 2022: Lokomotiv Tashkent
- 2023–2024: Olympic Tashkent (assistant coach)
- 2025–: Oqtepa
- * Club domestic league appearances and goals

Server Reshatovich Djeparov (born 3 October 1982) is a former Uzbek professional football midfielder who is the assistant coach of the Uzbekistan national team. He has won the Asian Footballer of the Year award twice in 2008 and 2011.

== Club career ==
=== Early career ===
"I really loved football! Dad told me that when matches were shown on TV, I froze and there was no way to distract me! I was only three years old."

— Server Djeparov.

He began his football career with Navbahor Namangan in 1997 at the age of 15.

=== Navbahor Namangan ===
He started his professional career with Navbahor Namangan in 2000, scoring 7 goals in 46 matches.

=== Pakhtakor ===
In 2002, he was transferred to Pakhtakor Tashkent, where he scored 34 goals in 96 matches. From 2002 to 2007 he won six Uzbek League championships and six Uzbek Cups.

=== Bunyodkor ===
In 2008, he was transferred to Bunyodkor. Djeparov scored 19 goals for the team in his first season, which made him the top goalscorer of the club and the 2008 Uzbek League. His team won its first ever Uzbek League title that year. For his instrumental role in Bunyodkor and the Uzbekistan national football team, he was awarded the Asian Footballer of the Year. As a part of an agreement with the Asian Football Confederation, Djeparov was offered to a month in trial with Premier League giants Chelsea. However, Bunyodkor's matches in the Uzbek League championship and the Asian Champions League meant that he was unable to attend. Anyway, this season is often described as the best season of his career.

=== FC Seoul ===
In July 2010, Djeparov was loaned out to FC Seoul of the K League 1 until the end of season on his own request. He scored his K League 1 debut goal in a 2–0 victory against Incheon United on October 2, 2010. In all, he contributed 1 goal and 7 assists in 16 matches in the K League 1 that season, playing an instrumental role in Seoul's first K League win in 10 years. On February 8, 2011, Seoul announced that they had made the move permanent for an undisclosed fee rumored to be about US$850,000, and signed a 3-year contract with Djeparov.

=== Al Shabab ===
After playing 15 games in Seoul, he was transferred to Al Shabab FC of the Saudi Premier League. The deal was announced at July 9, 2011. He was unremarkable on the pitch, and was rumored to be unhappy with his limited playing opportunities and Saudi Arabia's weather.

=== Seongnam Ilhwa Chunma / Seongnam FC ===
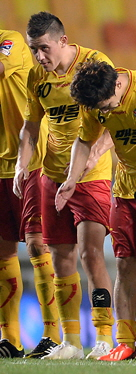
Djeparov playing for Ulsan Hyundai FC

In February 2013 he made a move to Seongnam Ilhwa Chunma of the K League 1.

In January 2014 Seongnam Ilhwa Chunma was purchased from the Tongil Group by Seongnam City Government. Seongnam City Government made major changes to the club, which included renaming it Seongnam FC. As Ivan Vuković, the previous owner of the number 10 jersey, decided to change his number to 32, Djeparov decided to take his number.

=== Esteghlal ===
On 15 January 2017, Djeparov completed his move to Esteghlal in Iran. He signed an internal one-and-a-half-year contract worth $500,000 including bonuses, however his internal contract could not be registered with Esteghlal due to a FIFA imposed transfer ban. Later he joined Sepahan on loan until the end of the season.

==== Sepahan (loan) ====
Djeparov made his debut for Sepahan in a 3–0 defeat against Machine Sazi on 9 February 2017. On 5 March, he scored his first goal for Sepahan against city rivals Zob Ahan. After his loan at Sepahan expired it was originally reported that Djeparov would not return to Esteghlal, however after negotiations between the player and the club, Djeparov announced he will return to Esteghlal.

==== Return to Esteghlal ====
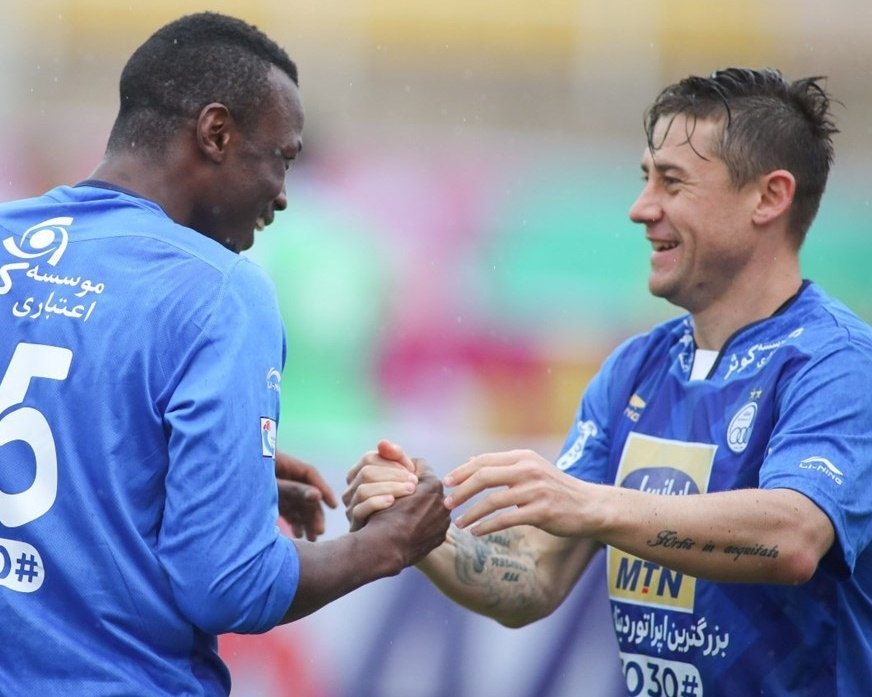
Djeparov with Mame Thiam in 2018.

On 28 June 2017, he made his debut for Esteghlal in the 1–0 defeat against Sanat Naft Abadan entering as a substitute for Hassan Beyt Saeed. On 11 August, he scored his first goal for Esteghlal in the 1–0 win against Tractor Sazi, a screamer which was 30 yards away from the goal. Uzbekistan Football Federation praised his goal on their official Instagram later. On 6 December, he scored his first brace for the club in a 3–0 victory against his previous club Sepahan. His first goal at the Hazfi Cup wascame in a 3–0 win against Iranjavan on 20 December 2017. He also played in the final of the competition, won 1–0 against Khooneh be Khooneh.

On 31 December 2017, Djeparov was ranked the 20th best player of Asia by Football Tribe's website. He was also named as the Persian Gulf Pro League's top assister of the year at the end of the season.

On 26 July 2018 Esteghlal chairman Amirhossein Fathi announced that Djeparov will leave the club after the parties could not agree on the terms to renew his contract.

=== FC Zhetysu ===
On 26 July 2018, Djeparov joined Kazakh side Zhetysu until the end of season. He made his debut in the League on 16 September in an away match with FC Tobol and scored equalized with a penalty 2–2, he played 290 minute.

=== Metallurg Bekabad ===
Djeparov joined Metallurg Bekabad in January 2019.

== International career ==
Djeparov has made 128 appearances and scored 25 goals for the senior Uzbekistan national team since May 2002 until September 2017. In 2011, he became the captain of the Uzbekistan and posted 2 goals and 2 assists in the 2011 AFC Asian Cup, leading his side to its first ever semifinals in the cup.

== Managerial career ==
Djeparov was named the head coach of Uzbekistan U-14 on 28 January 2020. Seven months later, he became the assistant coach of Uzbekistan.

== Personal life ==
Djeparov is of Crimean Tatar ethnicity and speaks fluent Russian, as well as comprehensible English, but only barely speaks Uzbek.

He has a son, Raul Djeparov, born June 18, 2007 in Tashkent. Raul was named after Real Madrid legend Raúl. He was part of the Bunyodkor Academy. Since the beginning of 2026 he has been playing for FK Oqtepa Toshkent, and on July 18, 2026, he signed a contract with PFC Dynamo Samarkand.

A few years before, his daughter Veronika was born.

== Career statistics ==
=== Club ===
As of 18 August 2019.

Club	Season	League			Cup		League Cup		Continental		Total	
Club	Season	Division	Apps	Goals	Apps	Goals	Apps	Goals	Apps	Goals	Apps	Goals
Navbahor Namangan	2000	Uzbek League	15	2	?	?	—		?	?	15	2
Navbahor Namangan	2001	Uzbek League	26	7	?	?	—		?	?	26	7
Navbahor Namangan	Total		41	9	?	?	—		?	?	41+	9+
Pakhtakor	2002	Uzbek League	26	7	?	?	—		?	?	?	7
Pakhtakor	2003	Uzbek League	27	6	?	?	—		?	?	?	6
Pakhtakor	2004	Uzbek League	21	11	?	?	—		?	?	?	11
Pakhtakor	2005	Uzbek League	22	10	?	?	—		?	?	?	10
Pakhtakor	2006	Uzbek League	29	18	?	?	—		?	?	?	18
Pakhtakor	2007	Uzbek League	27	12	?	?	—		?	?	-	12
Pakhtakor	Total		152	64	?	?	—		?	?	96+	64+
Bunyodkor	2008	Uzbek League	23	19	?	1	—		10	1	?	21
Bunyodkor	2009	Uzbek League	12	16	?	0	—		9	2	?	13
Bunyodkor	2010	Uzbek League	11	3	3	1	—		7	0	?	4
Bunyodkor	Total		46	38	3+	2	—		26	3	74+	38+
FC Seoul	2010	K-League	16	1	—		2	0	—		18	1
FC Seoul	2011	K-League	15	0	1	1	—		6	0	22	1
FC Seoul	Total		31	1	1	1	2	0	6	0	40	2
Al-Shabab	2011–12	Saudi Pro League	19	2	2^{1}	0	2^{2}	0	—		23	2
Al-Shabab	2012–13	Saudi Pro League	6	2	0	0	—		—		6	2
Al-Shabab	Total		25	4	2	0	2	0	—		29	4
Seongnam FC	2013	K League Classic	31	6	2	1	—		—		33	7
Seongnam FC	2014	K League Classic	24	7	4	0	—		—		28	7
Seongnam FC	Total		55	13	6	1	—		—		59	14
Ulsan Hyundai FC	2015	K League Classic	22	6	1	0	—		—		23	6
Lokomotiv Tashkent	2016	Uzbek League	23	7	2	1	—		9	0	34	8
Sepahan	2016–17	Persian Gulf Pro League	10	1	0	0	—		—		10	1
Esteghlal	2017–18	Persian Gulf Pro League	27	4	5	1	—		8	1	40	6
Zhetysu	2018	Kazakhstan Premier League	5	1	0	0	—		—		5	1
Metallurg Bekabad	2019	Uzbekistan Super League	9	2	—		1	0	—		10	2
Career Total			156	64	13+	4+	5	0	41+	3+	420+	147+

Matches in Saudi Crown Prince Cup
Matches in King Cup of Champions

=== International ===
Appearances and goals by national team and year
National team	Year	Apps	Goals
Uzbekistan
Uzbekistan	2002	2	0
Uzbekistan	2003	8	1
Uzbekistan	2004	9	2
Uzbekistan	2005	6	1
Uzbekistan	2006	5	2
Uzbekistan	2007	11	1
Uzbekistan	2008	10	5
Uzbekistan	2009	10	1
Uzbekistan	2010	3	0
Uzbekistan	2011	15	4
Uzbekistan	2012	8	1
Uzbekistan	2013	11	3
Uzbekistan	2014	6	2
Uzbekistan	2015	9	1
Uzbekistan	2016	9	1
Uzbekistan	2017	6	0
Total		128	25

=== International goals ===
Scores and results list Uzbekistan's goals tally first.

#	Date	Venue	Opponent	Score	Result	Competition
1	9 June 2004	Pakhtkor Markaziy Stadium, Tashkent, Uzbekistan	Palestine	3–0	3–0	2006 FIFA World Cup qualification
2	8 September 2004	Ahmed bin Ali Stadium, Al Rayyan, Qatar	Palestine	2–0	3–0	2006 FIFA World Cup qualification
3	17 August 2005	Pakhtakor Markaziy Stadium, Tashkent, Uzbekistan	Kuwait	1–2	3–2	2006 FIFA World Cup qualification
4	22 February 2006	Pakhtakor Markaziy Stadium, Tashkent, Uzbekistan	Bangladesh	2–0	5–0	2007 AFC Asian Cup qualification
5	11 October 2006	Bangladesh Army Stadium, Dhaka, Bangladesh	Bangladesh	3–0	4–0	2007 AFC Asian Cup qualification
6	5 July 2007	Seoul World Cup Stadium, Seoul, South Korea	South Korea	1–2	1–2	Friendly
7	22 March 2008	Pakhtakor Markaziy Stadium, Tashkent, Uzbekistan	Jordan	3–1	4–1	Friendly
8	26 March 2008	MHSK Stadium, Tashkent, Uzbekistan	Saudi Arabia	3–0	3–0	2010 FIFA World Cup qualification
9	2 June 2008	National Stadium, Singapore, Singapore	Singapore	3–2	7–3	2010 FIFA World Cup qualification
10	2 June 2008	National Stadium, Singapore, Singapore	Singapore	5–2	7–3	2010 FIFA World Cup qualification
11	14 June 2008	MHSK Stadium, Tashkent, Uzbekistan	Lebanon	3–0	3–0	2010 FIFA World Cup qualification
12	28 December 2008	Ramat Gan Stadium, Ramat Gan, Israel	Israel	2–2	3–2	Friendly
13	14 November 2009	JAR Stadium, Tashkent, Uzbekistan	Malaysia	1–0	3–1	2011 AFC Asian Cup qualification
14	7 January 2011	Khalifa International Stadium, Doha, Qatar	Qatar	2–0	2–0	2011 AFC Asian Cup
15	12 January 2011	Thani bin Jassim Stadium, Doha, Qatar	Kuwait	2–1	2–1	2011 AFC Asian Cup
16	23 July 2011	Pakhtakor Markaziy Stadium, Tashkent, Uzbekistan	Kyrgyzstan	3–0	4–0	2014 FIFA World Cup qualification
17	7 August 2011	Pakhtakor Markaziy Stadium, Tashkent, Uzbekistan	Japan	1–0	1–1	2014 FIFA World Cup qualification
18	12 October 2012	Maktoum Bin Rashid Al Maktoum Stadium, Dubai, United Arab Emirates	United Arab Emirates	1–1	2–2	Friendly
19	26 March 2013	Bunyodkor Stadium, Tashkent, Uzbekistan	Lebanon	1–0	1–0	2014 FIFA World Cup qualification
20.	6 June 2013	Tianhe Stadium, Guangzhou, China	China	2–1	2–1	Friendly
21.	6 September 2013	King Abdullah Stadium, Amman, Jordan	Jordan	1–1	1–1	2014 FIFA World Cup qualification
22.	7 September 2014	Pakhtakor Markaziy Stadium, Tashkent, Uzbekistan	New Zealand	3–0	3–1	Friendly
23.	14 October 2014	Dubai Club Stadium, Dubai, United Arab Emirates	United Arab Emirates	3–0	4–0	Friendly
24.	17 November 2015	Grand Hamad Stadium, Doha, Qatar	Yemen	2–0	3–1	2018 FIFA World Cup qualification
25.	14 February 2016	Al-Rashid Stadium, Dubai, UAE	Lebanon	2–0	2–0	Friendly

== Honours ==
Pakhtakor

- Uzbek League: 2002, 2003, 2004, 2005, 2006, 2007
- Uzbek Cup: 2002, 2003, 2004, 2005, 2006, 2007
- CIS Cup: 2007

Bunyodkor

- Uzbek League: 2008, 2009
- Uzbek Cup: 2008

FC Seoul

- K League 1: 2010
- League Cup: 2010

Al Shabab

- Saudi Professional League: 2012

Seongnam

- FA Cup: 2014

Lokomotiv

- Uzbek League: 2016
- Uzbek Cup: 2016

Esteghlal

- Hazfi Cup: 2017–18

Individual

- CIS Cup top goalscorer: 2007 (shared)
- Uzbek League Topscorer: 2008 (19 goals)
- Uzbekistan Footballer of the Year: 2008, 2010
- AFC Asian Footballer of the Year: 2008, 2011
- AFC Asian Cup Individual Quality Player: 2011
- Persian Gulf Pro League top assister of the Year: 2018
- AFC Asian Cup Fans' All Time Best XI: 2018
- Uzbekistan's AFC Champions League Legend

== See also ==
- List of men's footballers with 100 or more international caps
