= Hossein Heydari =

Iranian association football player

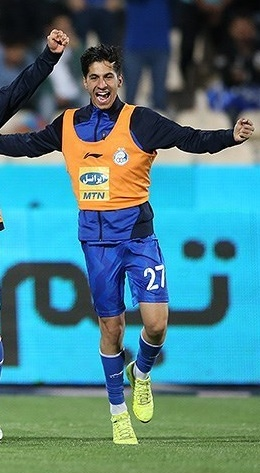

Personal information
- Date of birth: 6 August 1998 (age 28)
- Place of birth: Tehran, Iran
- Height: 1.76 m (5 ft 9 in)
- Positions: Attacking midfielder; second striker

Team information
- Current team: Shahrdari Noshahr
- Number: 11

Youth career
- Damash Tehran
- Khoneh Be Khoneh
- 2016–2017: Mes Vision Asia
- 2017–2019: Esteghlal

Senior career*
Years	Team	Apps	(Gls)
2017–2019	Esteghlal	1	(0)
2019–2020	Qashqai	25	(3)
2020–2021	Paykan	2	(0)
2021–2023	Chooka Talesh	24	(2)
2023–2024	Shahrdari Mahshahr	24	(2)
2024–	Shahrdari Noshahr	8	(0)
- * Club domestic league appearances and goals as of 29 October 2024

Hossein Heydari (Persian: حسین حیدری, born 6 August 1998) is an Iranian football midfielder who plays for Shahrdari Noshahr.

== Club career ==
=== Esteghlal ===
He made his debut for Esteghlal in 27th fixtures of 2017–18 Persian Gulf Pro League against Meshki Pooshan while he substituted in for Jaber Ansari.
