= Alaei =

Alaei (Persian: علایی, lit. "excellent") is an Iranian surname which can also be found in the Iranian diaspora. Notable people with the surname include:

- Abolfazl Alaei (born 1994), Iranian football player
- Daniel Alaei (born 1982), American poker player
- Hossein Alaei, Iranian military officer
- Shamseddin Amir-Alaei (1900–1994), Iranian politician
