= 2017–18 Hazfi Cup =

2017–18 Hazfi Shield Cup
Khorramshahr Liberation Cup
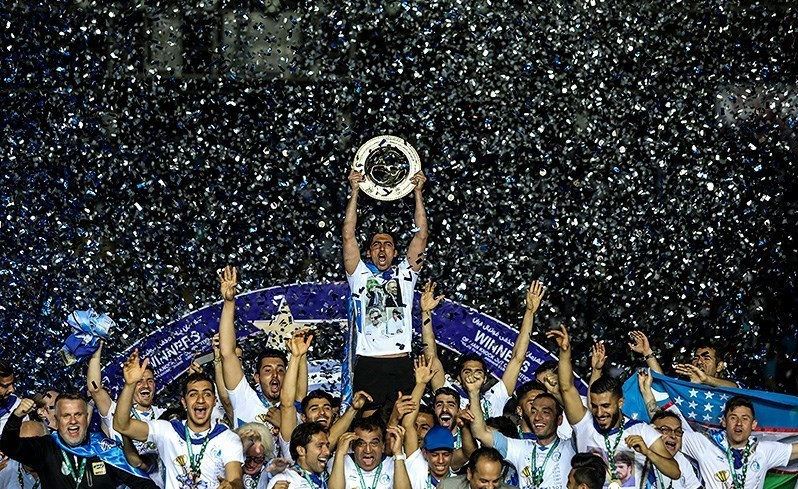
- Esteghlal

Tournament details
- Country: Iran
- Dates: 16 August 2017 – 13 May 2018
- Teams: 62

Final positions
- Champions: Esteghlal (7th title)
- Runners-up: Khooneh be Khooneh

Tournament statistics
- Matches played: 54
- Goals scored: 162 (3 per match)
- Top goal scorer: (Iran) Mehdi Sharifi (5 goals)

The 2017–18 Hazfi Shield Cup was the 31st season of the Iranian football knockout competition. The competition begin in August 2017 and the final was played on May 3, 2018. Mehdi Sharifi, then center forward for Persian side Tractor SC was the Cup's top scorer with five goals. The Cup was won by Esteghla FC in a 1–0 victory over Khooneh Be Khooneh. The final's only goal was scored by Mame Thiam, an Esteghlal forward in the 35' minute of the game. This was Esteghlal seventh Hazfi Cup title.

== Participating teams ==
A total of 62 teams participated in the 2017–18 Hazfi Cup. The teams were divided into three main groups, and included 16 teams of the Persian Gulf Pro League and 18 teams of Azadegan League.

== First stage ==
In the first stage of "2017–18 Hazfi Cup", 28 teams from Provincial Leagues were presented. Following the competition of the first stage, 14 teams qualified for the second stage.

=== First round ===
7 August 2017 1	Padidieh Malekshahi	1–2	Shohadaye Chavar	Ilam
17:30 DST+04:30

7 August 2017 2	Shahrdari Khodabandeh	1–3	Sardar Bukan	Zanjan
17:30 DST+04:30

3	Sepehrband Azerbaijan	(w/o)	Miad Moghan Ardabil
Note: Sepehrband Azerbaijan withdrew

8 August 2017 4	Qashqai Shiraz	10–0	Pasargad Choram	Shiraz
17:00 DST+04:30

7 August 2017 5	Shohadaye Babolsar	4–3	Shahid Mataji	Babolsar
17:30 DST+04:30

6	Shahid Kalhor	(w/o)	Gol Abrisham
Note: Shahid Kalhor Shahriar withdrew

7 August 2017 7	Dokhaniat Gilan	1–5	Damash Gilan	Rasht
20:00 DST+04:30	Tarivardi 62'		Poursafshekan 3'; Talebi 14'; Mortazavi 38' 56' 78'

8 August 2017 8	Omid Garrus Bijar	1–2	Soldouz	Bijar
17:30 DST+04:30

8 August 2017 9	Moghavemat Tehran	1–2	Niroo Zamini Tehran	Tehran
17:30 DST+04:30

7 August 2017 10	Aria Sangar Semnan	1–1 (5–6 p)	Hadi Norouzi Mazandaran	Semnan
17:30 DST+04:30

11	Shahin Lordegan	(w/o)	Naft Omidiyeh
Note: Naft Omidiyeh withdrew

12	Shamoushak Noshahr	(w/o)	Simorgh Kimia Alborz
Note: Simorgh Kimia Alborz withdrew

13	Lidoma Mamasani	(w/o)	Siraf Kangan
Note: Lidoma Mamasani withdrew

14	Malavan Kish	(w/o)	Khousheh Talaei Saveh
Note: Malavan Kish withdrew

== Second stage ==
The 18 teams from Azadegan League are entered to competition from the second stage. They compete together with 14 winner teams of First stage.

=== Second round ===
18 August 2017 1	Hadi Norouzi Mazandaran	2–7	Gol Gohar
16:45 DST+04:30

2	Nassaji Mazandaran	(w/o)	Mes Rafsanjan
Note: Mes Rafsanjan withdrew

3	Malavan	(w/o)	Machine Sazi
Note: Machine Sazi withdrew

4	Miad Moghan Ardabil	(w/o)	Saba Qom
Note: Saba Qom withdrew

20 August 2017 5	Shohadaye Chavar	0–3	Oxin Alborz	Ilam
17:00 DST+04:30

20 August 2017 6	Sardar Bukan	0–1	Naft Masjed Soleyman	Bukan
17:00 DST+04:30

7	Bargh Jadid Shiraz	(w/o)	Shamoushak Noshahr
Note: Shamoushak Noshahr withdrew

21 August 2017 8	Damash Gilan	4–1	Soldouz	Rasht
18:00 DST+04:30	Mortazavi 5'; Poursafshekan 66' 79'; Talebi 90'

20 August 2017 9	Siraf Kangan	1–0	Sanat Mes	Bushehr
19:00 DST+04:30

20 August 2017 10	Sh. Mahshahr	0–1	Baadraan Tehran	Ahvaz
20:00 DST+04:30

11	Khooneh Be Khooneh	(w/o)	Aluminium Arak
Note: Aluminium Arak withdrew

21 August 2017 12	Gol Abrisham	1–0	Sh. Tabriz	Tehran
16:45 DST+04:30

21 August 2017 13	Rah Ahan	1–1 (5–4 p)	Shohadaye Babolsar	Tehran
16:45 DST+04:30

21 August 2017 14	Fajr Sepasi	1–0	Qashqai Shiraz	Shiraz
17:00 DST+04:30

21 August 2017 15	Iranjavan	4–0	Shahin Lordegan	Bushehr
19:00 DST+04:30

21 August 2017 16	Khousheh Talaei Saveh	0–0 (4–5 p)	Niroo Zamini Tehran	Saveh
16:30 DST+04:30

=== Third round (round of 32) ===
The 16 teams from Iran Pro League entered the competition from the second stage.

7 September 2017 1	Damash Gilan	1–0	Siraf Kangan	Rasht
17:45 DST+04:30	M. Mokhtari 29'			Stadium: Azodi

7 September 2017 2	Padideh	1–2	Tractor	Mashhad
18:15 DST+04:30	M. Abbasian 70'		M. Sharifi 87'; M. Iranpourian 90'	Stadium: Samen Stadium; Attendance: 1,200; Referee: Mohammad Hossein Zahedifar

7 September 2017 3	Sepahan	0–1	Sanat Naft	Isfahan
18:45 DST+04:30			Magno Batista 9'	Stadium: Naghsh-e Jahan Stadium; Attendance: 6,000; Referee: Payam Heydari

7 September 2017 4	Esteghlal Khuzestan	5–0	Miad Moghan Ardabil	Ahvaz
20:00 DST+04:30	Claudir 29', 53'; F. Bahmani 64'; Saba Tavadze 72'; F. Karimi 90' (pen.)			Stadium: Ghadir Stadium

8 September 2017 5	Niroo Zamini Tehran	0–4	Gol Abrisham	Tehran
17:00 DST+04:30

8 September 2017 6	Gol Gohar	1–2	Esteghlal	Sirjan
17:45 DST+04:30	M. Gholami 76' (pen.)	Report	O. Noorafkan 56'; K. Heydari 85'	Stadium: Gol Gohar; Attendance: 3,000; Referee: Hossein Zargar

8 September 2017 7	Zob Ahan	1–1 (a.e.t.) (2–4 p)	Fajr Sepasi	Fooladshahr
18:45 DST+04:30	M. Nejad Mehdi 4'	Report	M. Nazari 32'	Stadium: Foolad Shahr Stadium

8 September 2017 8	Oxin Alborz	2–1	Saipa	Karaj
18:45 DST+04:30	Y. Vakili 6'; S. Shafiei 90'		M. Abbaszadeh 77'	Stadium: Enghelab Stadium

8 September 2017 9	Pars Jonoubi Jam	0–0 (a.e.t.) (3–4 p)	Nassaji Mazandaran	Jam
20:00 DST+04:30				Stadium: Takhti Stadium

9 September 2017 10	Baadraan Tehran	3–1	Paykan	Tehran
16:45 DST+04:30	K. Eslami 4'; M. Rigi 65' (pen.); A. Mirbozorgi 89'		A. Sadeghi 45'

9 September 2017 11	Rah Ahan	1–2	Khooneh Be Khooneh	Tehran
16:45 DST+04:30				Stadium: Ekbatan Stadium

9 September 2017 12	Sepidrood	1–3 (a.e.t.)	Malavan	Rasht
18:00 DST+04:30	Ebrahimi 88' (pen.)		Pejman Noori 36'; Moradi 99'; Naghdipir 114'	Stadium: Sardar Jangal Stadium; Attendance: 8,000

9 September 2017 13	Siah Jamegan	3–1	Bargh Jadid Shiraz	Mashhad
18:00 DST+04:30				Stadium: Samen Stadium

9 September 2017 14	Foolad	0–1	Iranjavan	Ahvaz
20:00 DST+04:30				Stadium: Ghadir Stadium

4 October 2017 15	Naft Masjed Soleyman	0–1	Gostaresh	Masjed Soleyman
DST+04:30			23' Afraz	Stadium: Behnam Mohammadi Stadium

21 October 2017 16	Persepolis	2–0	Naft Tehran	Tehran
DST+04:30	G. Mensha 73'; A. Alipour 83' (pen.)			Stadium: Azadi Stadium

=== Fourth round (round of 16) ===
20 October 2017 47	Esteghlal	2–1	Nassaji Mazandaran	Tehran
16:45				Stadium: Azadi Stadium; Attendance: 25,000; Referee: Mooud Bonyadifar

26 October 2017 48	Tractor	5–2 (a.e.t.)	Fajr Sepasi	Tabriz
17:00				Stadium: Yadegar-e Emam

26 October 2017 49	Iranjavan	2–1	Gol Abrisham	Bushehr
17:00				Stadium: Shahid Beheshti Stadium

26 October 2017 50	Sanat Naft	2–1 (a.e.t.)	Damash Gilan	Abadan
18:45				Stadium: Takhti Stadium

27 October 2017 51	Malavan	0–2	Esteghlal Khuzestan	Bandar-e Anzali
14:00				Stadium: Takhti Stadium

27 October 2017 52	Khooneh Be Khooneh	0–0 (a.e.t.) (3–2 p)	Siah Jamegan	Babol
14:۰۰				Stadium: Haft-e Tir Stadium

27 October 2017 53	Gostaresh	0–0 (a.e.t.) (5–4 p)	Oxin Alborz	Tabriz
14:30				Stadium: Bonyan Diesel Stadium

15 December 2017 54	Baadraan Tehran	1–2	Persepolis	Tehran
16:15 IRST +03:30	M. Rezaei 40'		G. Mensha 36' (pen.); Sh. Khalilzadeh 53'	Stadium: Azadi Stadium; Attendance: 24,000; Referee: Hasan Akrami

=== Fifth round (quarter-final) ===
19 December 2017 55	Esteghlal Khuzestan	0–0 (a.e.t.) (4–3 p)	Tractor	Ahvaz
14:30				Stadium: Ghadir Stadium; Attendance: 500

20 December 2017 56	Esteghlal	3–0	Iranjavan	Tehran
16:20	M.Hosseini 45+4'; S.Djeparov 50'; A.Ghorbani 90+2'			Stadium: Azadi Stadium; Attendance: 15,000

18 December 2017 57	Khooneh Be Khooneh	2–0	Gostaresh Foolad	Babol
13:45	M. Miri 54'; R. Bagheri 87'			Stadium: Haft-e Tir Stadium; Attendance: 6,000

19 December 2017 58	Persepolis	1–1 (a.e.t.) (4–5 p)	Sanat Naft Abadan	Tehran
16:20	Farshad Ahmadzadeh 26'		48' Ali Abdollahzadeh	Stadium: Azadi Stadium; Attendance: 6,000
	Penalties
	Godwin Mensha (penalty missed); Hossein Mahini (penalty scored); Bashar Resan (penalty scored); Mohammad Ansari (penalty scored); Ali Alipour (penalty missed); Mohsen Rabiekhah (penalty scored); Siamak Nemati (penalty missed)		(penalty missed) Hossein Baghlani; (penalty scored) Masoud Ebrahimzadeh; (penalty missed) Zobeir Niknafs; (penalty scored) Luciano Pereira; (penalty scored) Taleb Reykani; (penalty scored) Augusto César; (penalty scored) Magno Batista

=== Sixth round (semifinal) ===
30 January 2018 59	Sanat Naft Abadan	1–2	Esteghlal	Abadan
14:45	Pereira 61'		8' Montazeri; 44' Shojaeian	Stadium: Takhti Stadium; Attendance: 15,000; Referee: Alireza Faghani

9 March 2018 60	Esteghlal Khuzestan	1–3 (a.e.t.)	Khooneh be Khooneh	Ahvaz
16:00	Doraghi 17'		62', 98', 120' Bagheri	Stadium: Ghadir Stadium; Attendance: 2,000; Referee: Hmaid Haj Malek

=== Seventh round (final) ===
3 May 2018 61	Esteghlal	1–0	Khooneh be Khooneh	Khorramshahr
19:15				Stadium: Khorramshahr Stadium; Attendance: 15,000; Referee: Hossein Zargar

== See also ==
- Iran Pro League 2017–18
- Azadegan League 2017–18
- Iran Football's 2nd Division 2017–18
- Iran Football's 3rd Division 2017–18
- Iranian Super Cup
