= Hassan Beyt Saeed =

Iranian football forward player

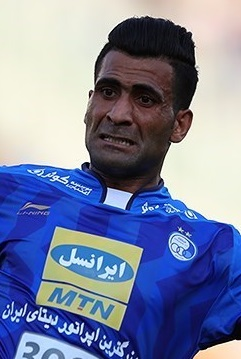

Personal information
- Date of birth: 1 April 1990 (age 36)
- Place of birth: Susangerd, Iran
- Height: 1.83 m (6 ft 0 in)
- Positions: Winger; forward

Youth career
- 2008–2010: Jonoub Sousangerd
- 2010–2013: Foolad

Senior career*
| Years | Team | Apps | (Gls) |
| 2013–2015 | Foolad B | 37 | (11) |
| 2015–2017 | Esteghlal Khuzestan | 60 | (20) |
| 2017 | Esteghlal | 9 | (0) |
| 2017–2020 | Foolad | 67 | (11) |
| 2020–2023 | Sanat Naft Abadan | 56 | (2) |
- * Club domestic league appearances and goals

Hassan Beyt Saeed (Persian: حسن بیت‌سعید; born 1 April 1990) is an Iranian former football player.

== Career ==
=== Foolad Novin ===
Beyt Saeed joined Foolad Novin in winter 2013. He was part of the Foolad Novin sides who promoted the club to the Azadegan League in 2014 before astonishingly becoming Azadegan League Champions the season after, in 2015.

=== Esteghlal Khuzestan ===
Having made a name for himself in the second division of Iranian football, Beyt Saeed joined first division side Esteghlal Khuzestan in the summer 2015. He made his debut for Ahvazi club on 30 July 2015. He scored two goals on 6 August 2015 in a 2–1 victory against Persepolis. Esteghlal Khuzestan's 2015-2016 season would mirror Leicester City's miracle that same year, sensationally becoming League Champions with an unlikely patch of footballers. Beyt Saeed from the left wing, and on occasion leading the forward line, proved himself an important piece of the puzzle, providing 10 goals and 3 assists in 30 league appearances. Beyt Saeed would make an assist in the 2016 Iranian Super Cup defeat against 2016 Hafzi Cup winners Zob Ahan. He would make his Champions League the following season in a 1–0 win against Saudi Arabian side Al-Fateh, assisting Abolfazl Alaei's winner. Beyt Saeed would score his first continental goal in a 1–1 draw against Lekhwiya. He and his club would progress to the knockout round, losing in the round of 16 against Asian powerhouse Al-Hilal 4–2 on aggregate.

=== Esteghlal ===
Beyt Saeed joined Iranian heavyweight Esteghlal in July 2017. However, after a disappointing season, he left the club after 6 months and officially terminated his contract on 16 December 2017.

=== Foolad ===
Beyt Saeed joined Foolad on 18 December 2017.

== Club career statistics ==
As of 26 June 2023.

| Club | Division | Season | League | | Hazfi Cup | | Asia | | Other | | Total | |
| Club | Division | Season | Apps | Goals | Apps | Goals | Apps | Goals | Apps | Goals | Apps | Goals |
|---|---|---|---|---|---|---|---|---|---|---|---|---|
| Foolad Novin | Division 2 | 2012–13 | ? | ? | – | – | – | | – | | ? | ? |
| Foolad Novin | Division 2 | 2013–14 | 17 | 4 | 1 | 0 | – | | – | | 18 | 4 |
| Foolad Novin | Division 1 | 2014–15 | 19 | 6 | 2 | 2 | – | | – | | 22 | 9 |
| Foolad Novin | Total | | 36 | 10 | 3 | 2 | 0 | 0 | 0 | 0 | 39 | 12 |
| Esteghlal Kh. | Pro League | 2015–16 | 30 | 10 | 1 | 0 | – | | – | | 31 | 10 |
| Esteghlal Kh. | Pro League | 2016–17 | 30 | 10 | 0 | 0 | 8 | 2 | 1 | 0 | 39 | 12 |
| Esteghlal Kh. | Total | | 60 | 20 | 1 | 0 | 8 | 2 | 1 | 0 | 70 | 22 |
| Esteghlal | Persian Gulf Pro League | 2017–18 | 9 | 0 | 1 | 0 | 0 | 0 | – | | 10 | 0 |
| Foolad | Persian Gulf Pro League | 2017-18 | 15 | 4 | 0 | 0 | – | | – | | 15 | 4 |
| Foolad | Persian Gulf Pro League | 2018-19 | 29 | 4 | 2 | 2 | – | | – | | 31 | 6 |
| Foolad | Persian Gulf Pro League | 2019-20 | 23 | 3 | 1 | 0 | – | | – | | 24 | 3 |
| Foolad | Total | | 67 | 11 | 3 | 2 | 0 | 0 | 0 | 0 | 70 | 13 |
| Sanat Naft | Persian Gulf Pro League | 2020-21 | 20 | 0 | 2 | 0 | – | | – | | 22 | 0 |
| Sanat Naft | Persian Gulf Pro League | 2021-22 | 25 | 1 | 1 | 0 | – | | – | | 26 | 1 |
| Sanat Naft | Persian Gulf Pro League | 2022-23 | 11 | 1 | 0 | 0 | – | | – | | 11 | 1 |
| Sanat Naft | Total | | 56 | 2 | 3 | 0 | 0 | 0 | 0 | 0 | 59 | 2 |
| Career Totals | | | 228 | 43 | 11 | 4 | 8 | 2 | 1 | 0 | 248 | 49 |

== Honours ==
=== Club ===
Jonoub Sousangerd

- Khouzestan Province League (1) : 2012–13

Foolad B

- Azadegan League (1) : 2014–15

Esteghlal Khuzestan

- Persian Gulf Pro League (1) : 2015–16

=== Individual ===
- Azadegan League Player of the season (1) : 2014–15
