= Jaber Ansari =

Iranian footballer (born 1987)

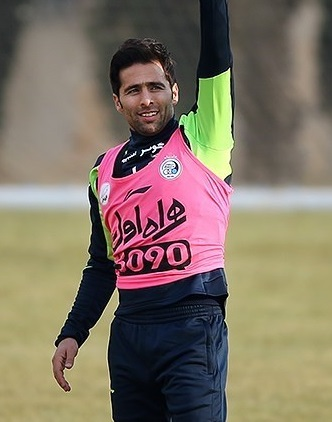
- Ansari in Esteghlal training

Personal information
- Date of birth: 10 January 1987 (age 39)
- Place of birth: Abhar, Iran
- Height: 1.70 m (5 ft 7 in)
- Positions: Winger; forward

Youth career
- 2003–2006: Shahrdari Tabriz

Senior career*
| Years | Team | Apps | (Gls) |
| 2006–2009 | Shahrdari Tabriz | 26 | (4) |
| 2009–2010 | Saba Qom | 25 | (1) |
| 2010–2012 | Saipa | 46 | (2) |
| 2012–2014 | Fajr Sepasi | 46 | (13) |
| 2014–2015 | Gostaresh Foolad | 44 | (10) |
| 2015–2019 | Esteghlal | 75 | (18) |
| 2019–2020 | Paykan | 16 | (0) |
| 2020–2021 | Aluminium Arak | 18 | (9) |
- * Club domestic league appearances and goals

Jaber Ansari (Persian: جابر انصاری; born 10 January 1987) is an Iranian former professional footballer who played as a winger or forward.

== Career ==
Ansari joined Saba Qom in 2009 after spending the previous season at Shahrdari Tabriz.

On 24 June 2015, Ansari signed a two-year contract with Esteghlal.

== Career statistics ==
As of 9 May 2018

| Club performance | | | League | | Cup | | Continental | | Total | |
| Season | Club | League | Apps | Goals | Apps | Goals | Apps | Goals | Apps | Goals |
| Iran | | | League | | Hazfi Cup | | Asia | | Total | |
|---|---|---|---|---|---|---|---|---|---|---|
| 2008–09 | Shahrdari Tabriz | Division 1 | 26 | 4 | 0 | 0 | - | - | 26 | 4 |
| 2009–10 | Saba Qom | Pro League | 25 | 1 | 0 | 0 | - | - | 25 | 1 |
| 2010–11 | Saipa | Pro League | 33 | 2 | 1 | 0 | - | - | 34 | 2 |
| 2011–12 | Saipa | Pro League | 12 | 0 | 1 | 0 | - | - | 13 | 0 |
| 2011–12 | Fajr Sepasi | Pro League | 5 | 0 | 0 | 0 | - | - | 5 | 0 |
| 2012–13 | Fajr Sepasi | Pro League | 22 | 8 | 2 | 0 | - | - | 24 | 8 |
| 2013–14 | Fajr Sepasi | Pro League | 17 | 6 | 0 | 0 | - | - | 22 | 6 |
| 2013–14 | Gostaresh | Pro League | 13 | 1 | 1 | 0 | - | - | 14 | 1 |
| 2014–15 | Gostaresh | Pro League | 30 | 9 | 0 | 0 | - | - | 30 | 9 |
| 2015–16 | Esteghlal | Pro League | 28 | 7 | 5 | 1 | - | - | 33 | 8 |
| 2016–17 | Esteghlal | Pro League | 22 | 6 | 3 | 1 | 3 | 0 | 28 | 7 |
| 2017–18 | Esteghlal | Pro League | 19 | 4 | 1 | 0 | 6 | 1 | 26 | 5 |
| Career total | | | 250 | 46 | 14 | 2 | 9 | 1 | 273 | 49 |

^{1} Statistics Incomplete.

== Honours ==
Esteghlal

- Hazfi Cup: 2017–18
