= Azim Gök =

Association football player

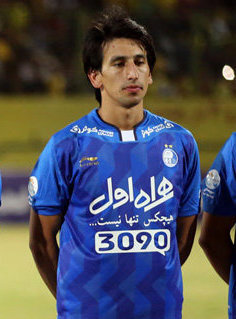

Personal information
- Full name: Abdol-Azim Gök
- Date of birth: 25 January 1996 (age 30)
- Place of birth: Gonbad-e Kavus, Iran
- Height: 1.86 m (6 ft 1 in)
- Position: Centre back

Team information
- Current team: Naft M.I.S
- Number: 55

Youth career
- –2013: Oghab Gonbad
- 2013–2014: Nassaji
- 2014–2016: Esteghlal

Senior career*
Years	Team	Apps	(Gls)
2016–2020	Esteghlal	2	(0)
2018–2020	→ Malavan (loan)	43	(0)
2020–2021	Mes Kerman	18	(1)
2021–2022	Malavan	16	(1)
2022–2024	Esteghlal Khuzestan	29	(1)
2025–	Naft M.I.S	16	(2)
- * Club domestic league appearances and goals as of 22 April 2025

Abdol-Azim Gök (Persian: عظیم گوک; born 25 January 1996) is an Iranian football centre back who plays for Naft M.I.S of Azadegan League.

== Club career ==
=== Esteghlal ===
He made his debut for Esteghlal in 18th fixtures of 2016–17 Persian Gulf Pro League against Sanat Naft Abadan while he substituted in for Ali Ghorbani.
