= 2017–18 Persian Gulf Pro League =

17th season of Persian Gulf Pro League

Persian Gulf Pro League
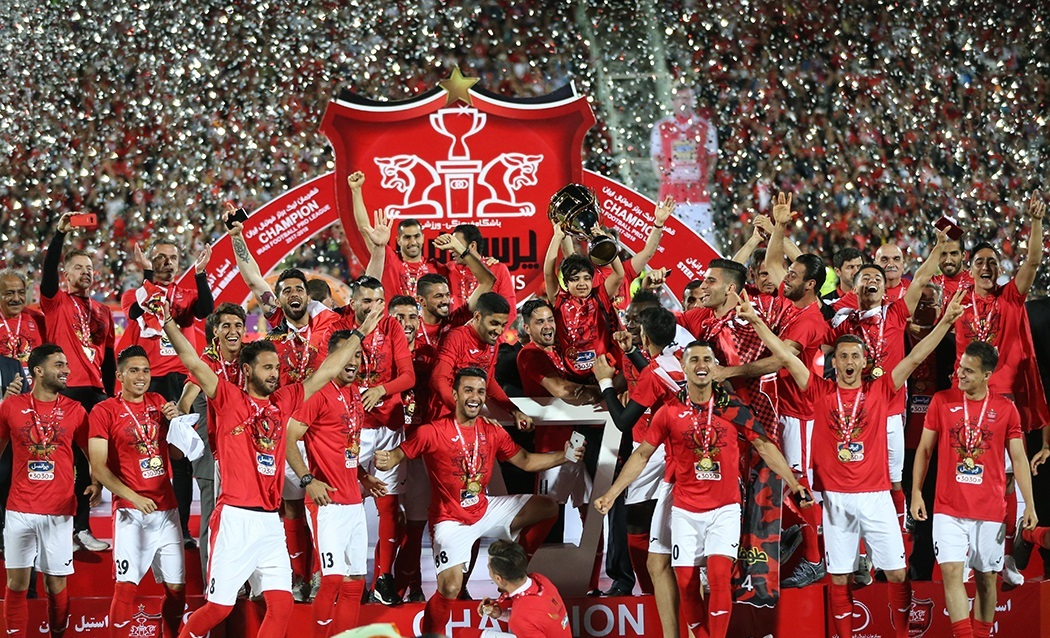
- Season: 2017–18
- Champions: Persepolis; 4th Pro League title 11th Iranian title
- Relegated: Naft Tehran; Meshki Pooshan
- Champions League: Persepolis; Zob Ahan; Esteghlal; Saipa
- Matches: 240
- Goals: 508 (2.12 per match)
- Top goalscorer: Ali Alipour (19 goals)
- Best goalkeeper: Alireza Beiranvand (17 clean sheets)
- Biggest home win: Zob Ahan 6–0 Esteghlal Khuzestan (15 September 2017)
- Biggest away win: Siah Jamegan 0–5 Sepahan (23 February 2018)
- Highest scoring: Zob Ahan 6–0 Esteghlal Khuzestan (15 September 2017)
- Longest winning run: 7 matches Paykan
- Longest unbeaten run: 18 matches Persepolis
- Longest winless run: 13 matches Siah Jamegan
- Longest losing run: 5 matches Siah Jamegan
- Highest attendance: 100,000; Esteghlal – Persepolis (1 March 2018)
- Lowest attendance: 0 (spectator ban); Sepahan – Tractor Sazi (20 November 2017); Esteghlal – Gostaresh (25 November 2017); Persepolis – Naft Tehran (5 January 2018); Foolad – Padideh (31 March 2018)
- Total attendance: 2,138,049
- Average attendance: 9,060

The 2017–18 Persian Gulf Pro League (formerly known as Iran Pro League) was the 35th season of Iran's Football League and 17th as Persian Gulf Pro League since its establishment in 2001. Persepolis were the defending champions. The season featured 14 teams from the 2016–17 Persian Gulf Pro League and two new teams promoted from the 2016–17 Azadegan League: Pars Jonoubi Jam as champions and Sepidrood. The league started on 27 July 2017 and ended on 27 April 2018. Persepolis won the Pro League title for the fourth time in their history, a total 11th Iranian title.

== Teams ==
=== Stadia and locations ===
Locations of clubs in 2017–18 Persian Gulf Pro League

Team	Location	Stadium	Capacity
Esteghlal	Tehran	Azadi	78,116
Esteghlal Khuzestan	Ahvaz	Ghadir	38,900
Foolad	Ahvaz	Ghadir	38,900
Gostaresh	Tabriz	Bonyan Diesel	12,000
Naft Tehran	Tehran	Takhti Tehran	30,122
Padideh	Mashhad	Samen; Imam Reza	35,000; 25,000
Pars Jonoubi Jam	Jam	Takhti Jam	15,000
Paykan	Shahr-e Qods	Shohada Shahr-e Qods	25,000
Persepolis	Tehran	Azadi	78,116
Saipa	Tehran	Shahid Dastgerdi	8,250
Sanat Naft	Abadan	Takhti Abadan	10,000
Sepahan	Isfahan	Naghsh-e-Jahan	75,000
Sepidrood	Rasht	Dr. Azodi; Sardar Jangal	11,000; 15,000
Siah Jamegan	Mashhad	Samen; Imam Reza	35,000; 25,000
Tractor Sazi	Tabriz	Sahand	66,833
Zob Ahan	Fuladshahr	Foolad Shahr	15,000

=== Personnel and kits ===
Note: Flags indicate national team as has been defined under FIFA eligibility rules. Players may hold more than one non-FIFA nationality.

Team	Manager	Captain	Kit manufacturer
Esteghlal	(Germany) Winfried Schäfer	(Iran) Mehdi Rahmati	(China) Li-Ning
Est. Khuzestan	(Iran) Abdollah Veisi	(Iran) Meysam Doraghi	(Iran) Start
Foolad	(Iran) Sirous Pourmousavi	(Iran) Ayoub Vali	(Germany) Uhlsport
Gostaresh	(Iran) Firouz Karimi	(Iran) Andranik Teymourian	(Iran) Merooj
Naft Talaieh	(Iran) Human Afazeli	(Iran) Alireza Ezzati	(Germany) Uhlsport
Padideh	(Iran) Mohammad Reza Mohajeri	(Iran) Reza Nasehi	(Turkey) Fitcom
Pars Jonoubi Jam	(Iran) Mehdi Tartar	(Iran) Meysam Naghizadeh	(Iran) Merooj
Paykan	(Iran) Majid Jalali	(Iran) Rahman Ahmadi	(Iran) Yousef Jame
Persepolis	(Croatia) Branko Ivanković	(Iran) Jalal Hosseini	(Spain) Joma
Saipa	(Iran) Ali Daei	(Iran) Roozbeh Shahalidoost	(Iran) Start
Sanat Naft	(Iran) Faraz Kamalvand	(Iran) Hossein Baghlani	(Iran) Merooj
Sepahan	(Iran) Mansour Ebrahimzadeh	(Iran) Hossein Papi	(China) Peak
Sepidrood	(Iran) Ali Karimi	(Iran) Hossein Kaebi	(Iran) Yousef Jame
Siah Jamegan	(Iran) Davoud Mahabadi	(Iran) Hossein Badamaki	(Iran) Start
Tractor Sazi	(Turkey) Ertuğrul Sağlam	(Iran) Mehdi Kiani	(China) Li-Ning
Zob Ahan	(Iran) Amir Ghalenoei	(Iran) Mehdi Rajabzadeh	(Iran) Merooj

== Managerial changes ==
Team	Outgoing head coach	Manner of departure	Date of vacancy	Position in table	Incoming head coach	Date of appointment
Gostaresh	(Iran) Faraz Kamalvand	Contract expired	3 May 2016	Pre-season	(Croatia) Luka Bonačić	10 May 2017
Sanat Naft	(Iran) Firouz Karimi	Contract expired	5 May 2017	Pre-season	(Iran) Faraz Kamalvand	13 May 2017
Saipa	(Iran) Hossein Faraki	Contract expired	9 May 2017	Pre-season	(Iran) Ali Daei	13 May 2017
Tractor Sazi	(Iran) Amir Ghalenoei	Contract expired	12 May 2017	Pre-season	(Iran) Yahya Golmohammadi	24 May 2017
Zob Ahan	(Iran) Mojtaba Hosseini	Contract expired	1 June 2017	Pre-season	(Iran) Amir Ghalenoei	10 June 2017
Esteghlal Khuzestan	(Iran) Sirous Pourmousavi	Contract expired	1 June 2017	Pre-season	(Iran) Abdollah Veisi	10 June 2017
Foolad	(Iran) Naeim Saadavi	Contract expired	1 June 2017	Pre-season	(Iran) Sirous Pourmousavi	3 June 2017
Naft Tehran	(Iran) Ali Daei	Signed by Saipa	11 May 2017	Pre-season	(Iran) Hamid Derakhshan	29 June 2017
Esteghlal	(Iran) Alireza Mansourian	Resigned	20 September 2017	16th	(Germany) Winfried Schäfer	2 October 2017
Gostaresh	(Croatia) Luka Bonačić	Sacked	28 September 2017	16th	(Iran) Firouz Karimi	29 September 2017
Siah Jamegan	(Iran) Akbar Misaghian	Sacked	15 October 2017	14th	(Iran) Alireza Marzban	15 October 2017
Siah Jamegan	(Iran) Alireza Marzban	Resigned	1 December 2017	16th	(Iran) Reza Enayati	1 December 2017
Sepidrood	(Iran) Ali Nazarmohammadi	Sacked	10 December 2017	15th	(Iran) Ali Karimi	1 January 2018
Naft Tehran	(Iran) Hamid Derakhshan	Resigned	17 December 2017	14th	(Iran) Human Afazeli	1 January 2018
Tractor Sazi	(Iran) Yahya Golmohammadi	Resigned	15 January 2018	11th	(Turkey) Ertuğrul Sağlam	19 January 2018
Sepahan	(Croatia) Zlatko Kranjčar	Mutual Consent	20 January 2018	12th	(Iran) Mansour Ebrahimzadeh	27 January 2018
Siah Jamegan	(Iran) Reza Enayati	Sacked	18 February 2018	16th	(Iran) Davoud Mahabadi	20 February 0218

== Foreign players ==
The number of foreign players is restricted to four per Persian Gulf Pro League team, including a slot for a player from AFC countries. A team can use four foreign players on the field in each game, including at least one player from the AFC country.
In bold: Players that have been capped for their national team.

Club	Player 1	Player 2	Player 3	Asian Player	Former Players
Esteghlal	(Brazil) Leandro Padovani	(North Macedonia) **Bojan Najdenov**	(Senegal) Mame Baba Thiam	(Uzbekistan) **Server Djeparov**	
Esteghlal Khuzestan	(Brazil) Claudir	(Mali) Moussa Coulibaly			(Georgia (country)) Saba Tavadze
Foolad					
Gostaresh	(Brazil) Fernando Jesus	(Brazil) Edson Henrique			(Serbia) Dragan Žarković
Naft Talaieh					
Padideh					
Pars Jonoubi Jam					(Cameroon) Aloys Nong (Costa Rica) **Michael Umaña**
Paykan	(Nigeria) Kenneth Ikechukwu	(Senegal) Arfang Daffé			(Nigeria) **Ezekiel Bassey**
Persepolis	(Croatia) Božidar Radošević	(Nigeria) Godwin Mensha		(Iraq) **Bashar Resan**	
Saipa	(Cameroon) Aloys Nong	(Ghana) **Samuel Sarfo**			
Sanat Naft	(Brazil) Augusto César	(Brazil) Luciano Pereira	(Brazil) Magno Batista	(Iraq) **Karrar Jassim**	
Sepahan	(Albania) Edon Hasani	(Ba'athist Syria) **Ibrahim Alma**		(Iraq) **Marwan Hussein**	(Brazil) Lee Oliveira (Brazil) Jairo Rodrigues (Brazil) Rafael Crivellaro
Sepidrood					
Siah Jamegan					(France) Goran Jerković (Croatia) Jure Čolak
Tractor Sazi	(Bosnia and Herzegovina) Sulejman Krpić	(Brazil) Jordi Almeida	(Croatia) Šime Gregov		
Zob Ahan	(Brazil) Kiros Stanlley	(Georgia (country)) **Giorgi Gvelesiani**		(Lebanon) **Rabih Ataya**	

== League table ==
Pos	Team	Pld	W	D	L	GF	GA	GD	Pts	Qualification or relegation
1	Persepolis (C)	30	19	7	4	48	15	+33	64	Qualification for the 2019 AFC Champions League group stage
2	Zob Ahan	30	15	10	5	46	30	+16	55	Qualification for the 2019 AFC Champions League qualifying play-offs
3	Esteghlal	30	15	9	6	43	18	+25	54	Qualification for 2019 AFC Champions League group stage (Note: Esteghlal qualified to AFC Champions League group stage directly by winning the Hazfi Cup)
4	Saipa	30	15	9	6	40	34	+6	54	Qualification for the 2019 AFC Champions League qualifying play-offs
5	Pars Jonoubi Jam	30	11	14	5	34	24	+10	47	
6	Paykan	30	12	9	9	32	26	+6	45	
7	Foolad	30	10	14	6	28	27	+1	44	
8	Sanat Naft	30	10	10	10	36	36	0	40	
9	Gostaresh	30	9	10	11	24	32	−8	37	
10	Tractor Sazi	30	8	10	12	28	33	−5	34	
11	Padideh	30	10	9	11	33	33	0	33 (Note: Padideh deducted 6 points by FIFA)	
12	Est. Khuzestan	30	7	10	13	25	42	−17	31	
13	Sepidrood	30	8	6	16	24	39	−15	30	
14	Sepahan	30	6	11	13	31	34	−3	29	
15	Naft Tehran (R)	30	5	9	16	23	41	−18	24	Relegation to the 2018–19 Azadegan League
16	Meshki Pooshan (R)	30	2	9	19	17	48	−31	15	Relegation to the 2018–19 Azadegan League

Updated to match(es) played on April 13, 2018. Source: IPL Stats, Soccerway
Rules for classification: 1) Points; 2) Goal difference; 3) Goals scored.
(C) Champions; (R) Relegated

== Results ==
Home \ Away	EST	ESK	FOL	GOS	NAF	PAD	PJJ	PAY	PRS	SAP	SNA	SEP	SPR	MEP	TRK	ZOB
Esteghlal		0–0	0–0	2–0	2–0	0–2	4–0	3–2	1–0	1–1	4–0	3–0	3–0	4–1	1–0	1–1
Est. Khuzestan	0–3		0–0	1–2	1–0	1–0	0–1	1–0	1–3	1–2	0–1	3–2	0–0	2–1	1–0	0–2
Foolad	1–4	1–1		2–1	1–1	1–0	1–0	1–2	1–1	1–1	1–1	2–0	2–1	1–1	0–1	1–1
Gostaresh	1–1	2–1	1–1		1–1	0–0	1–4	0–3	0–3	3–1	0–0	0–0	1–0	0–0	1–2	0–1
Naft Tehran	1–2	1–0	1–2	0–0		0–1	0–0	1–1	0–3	0–1	1–1	1–0	2–1	4–1	2–0	0–1
Padideh	0–0	2–2	2–2	0–2	3–1		1–2	1–1	0–1	3–0	1–0	4–0	1–0	2–1	0–3	2–2
Pars Jonoubi Jam	2–0	1–1	0–0	0–2	3–0	1–1		3–2	0–1	0–0	2–1	0–0	3–1	1–0	1–1	0–0
Paykan	0–0	0–0	1–0	1–0	3–1	1–1	1–1		1–3	1–2	1–1	1–0	0–0	2–1	2–1	0–0
Persepolis	1–0	1–0	2–0	1–1	0–0	0–0	1–1	0–1		1–2	2–0	2–0	3–0	1–1	2–0	4–0
Saipa	1–0	3–2	2–0	0–0	4–2	1–0	1–1	1–0	0–2		3–2	1–1	1–1	1–0	0–2	4–2
Sanat Naft	1–0	3–3	0–1	0–1	1–0	2–0	1–1	1–0	0–3	3–0		3–2	3–0	4–1	1–1	2–2
Sepahan	0–1	1–1	0–1	1–0	0–0	4–0	1–1	0–1	2–2	1–1	1–1		0–0	2–0	3–0	1–2
Sepidrood	1–2	1–1	0–0	1–2	3–1	2–1	1–0	1–0	0–1	2–0	2–0	2–1		1–2	1–0	1–2
Meshki Pooshan	0–0	0–1	1–2	0–1	1–1	0–2	0–1	0–2	0–1	0–3	0–1	0–5	2–0		0–0	2–2
Tractor Sazi	0–0	3–0	1–1	2–1	2–1	1–2	1–1	0–1	1–2	1–2	1–1	1–1	2–1	1–1		0–0
Zob Ahan	2–1	6–0	0–1	3–0	2–0	2–1	0–3	2–1	2–1	1–1	2–1	0–2	3–0	0–0	3–0	

Updated to match(es) played on March 13, 2018. Source: PersianLeague Stats
Legend: Blue = home team win; Yellow = draw; Red = away team win.

=== Positions by round ===
Team ╲ Round	1	2	3	4	5	6	7	8	9	10	11	12	13	14	15	16	17	18	19	20	21	22	23	24	25	26	27	28	29	30
Persepolis	2	2	1	1	1	2	3	2	1	1	1	1	1	1	1	1	1	1	1	1	1	1	1	1	1	1	1	1	1	1
Zob Ahan	6	4	5	7	7	6	7	7	7	8	7	7	8	10	9	9	8	7	4	4	3	2	2	2	2	2	2	3	2	2
Esteghlal	13	11	9	11	15	15	16	11	12	13	11	11	9	8	7	6	5	4	5	6	6	6	6	3	3	3	3	4	3	3
Saipa	10	5	3	3	3	5	6	6	6	6	6	6	6	6	5	5	7	6	7	5	4	4	4	7	5	5	4	2	4	4
Paykan	9	10	13	16	12	7	5	4	3	3	3	3	3	4	4	4	4	5	6	7	8	8	7	5	4	4	5	5	5	5
Pars Jonoubi Jam	1	1	2	2	2	1	1	1	2	2	2	2	2	2	2	2	3	3	3	2	5	5	5	4	6	7	7	7	6	6
Foolad	15	12	10	4	6	4	4	5	5	5	5	4	4	3	3	3	2	2	2	3	2	3	3	6	7	6	6	6	7	7
Sanat Naft	5	9	4	5	5	11	11	12	9	7	8	9	7	7	6	8	6	9	9	9	9	9	9	8	8	8	8	8	8	8
Gostaresh	16	16	12	15	16	16	13	16	16	14	14	10	12	9	8	7	9	8	8	8	7	7	8	9	9	9	9	9	9	9
Padideh	8	3	6	6	4	3	2	3	4	4	4	5	5	5	10	11	11	10	10	10	10	11	11	13	12	12	12	11	10	10
Tractor Sazi	14	15	16	13	9	9	10	8	8	11	9	13	10	11	11	10	10	11	11	11	11	10	10	10	10	10	10	10	11	11
Sepidrood	12	14	15	14	14	10	8	10	11	9	10	12	14	15	15	13	13	13	15	14	14	14	14	14	14	13	13	13	12	12
Est. Khuzestan	4	8	8	9	11	14	15	15	15	16	15	15	13	13	13	14	14	15	14	15	15	15	15	15	15	14	14	14	13	13
Sepahan	11	13	14	10	10	13	12	14	10	12	13	8	11	12	12	12	12	12	12	12	13	13	13	11	11	11	11	12	14	14
Naft Tehran	3	7	11	12	13	12	14	9	13	10	12	14	15	14	14	15	15	14	13	13	12	12	12	12	13	15	15	15	15	15
Siah Jamegan	7	6	7	8	8	8	9	13	14	15	16	16	16	16	16	16	16	16	16	16	16	16	16	16	16	16	16	16	16	16

Leader : 2019 AFC Champions League Group stage
2019 AFC Champions League qualifying play-off round
Relegation to 2018-19 Azadegan League

Source: IranProLeague Stats

== Season statistics ==
=== Top scorers ===
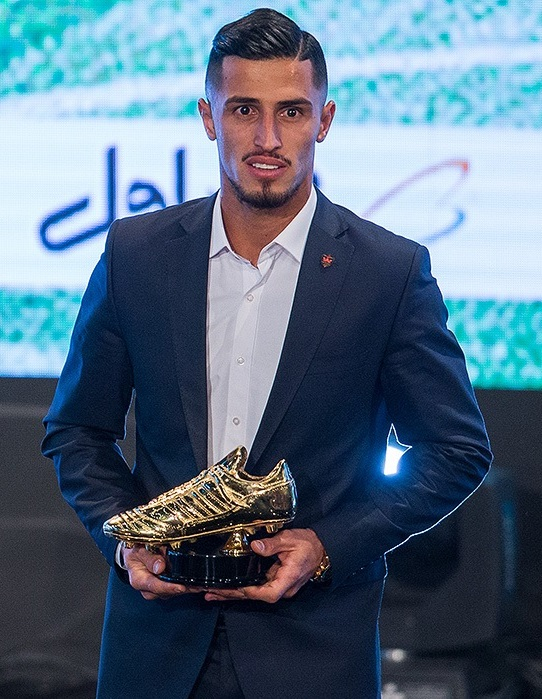
Ali Alipour won the Persian Gulf Pro League Golden Boot after scoring 19 goals.

Rank	Player	Club	Goals
1	(Iran) Ali Alipour	Persepolis	19
2	(Iran) Morteza Tabrizi	Zob Ahan	13
3	(Brazil) Luciano Pereira	Sanat Naft	12
4	(Iran) Sasan Ansari	Sepahan	11
4	(Iran) Mohammad Ghazi	Padideh	11
6	(Iran) Mehdi Torabi	Saipa	10
7	(Brazil) Kiros Stanlley	Zob Ahan	9
8	(Iran) Issa Alekasir	Naft Tehran	8
8	(Iran) Reza Khaleghifar	Goustaresh Foulad	8
10	(Iran) Jalaleddin Alimohammadi	Sepahan	7
10	(Iran) Ali Ghorbani	Esteghlal	7
10	(Iraq) Karrar Jassim	Sanat Naft	7
10	(Iran) Rahim Zahivi	Foolad	7

=== Hat-tricks ===
Player	Club	Against	Result	Date
(Iran) Morteza Tabrizi	Zob Ahan	Esteghlal Khuzestan	6–0 (H)	15 September 2017
(Iran) Saman Nariman Jahan	Gostaresh Foulad	Saipa	3–1 (H)	30 November 2017
(Iran) Mohsen Karimi	Esteghlal	Sanat Naft	4–0 (H)	24 December 2017

=== Clean sheets ===
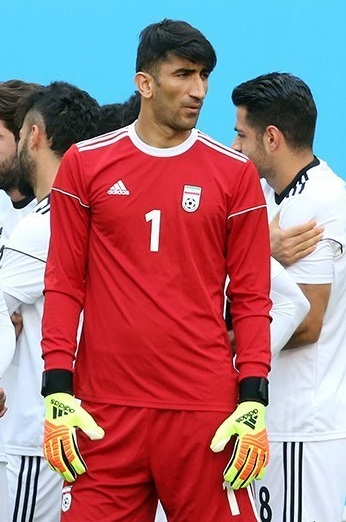
Alireza Beiranvand won his second Persian Gulf Pro League Golden Glove after keeping 17 clean sheets for Persepolis.

Rank	Player	Club	Clean sheets
1	(Iran) Alireza Beiranvand	Persepolis	17
2	(Iran) Mohammad Rashid Mazaheri	Zob Ahan	12
3	(Iran) Hossein Hosseini	Esteghlal	10
3	(Brazil) Fernando Jesus	Gostaresh Foulad	10
5	(Iran) Mohsen Forouzan	Pars Jonoubi	9
5	(Iran) Payam Niazmand	Paykan	9
7	(Iran) Hamed Fallahzadeh	Saipa	8
7	(Iran) Saeid Jalali Rad	Padideh	8
7	(Iran) Vahid Sheikhveisi	Est. Khuzestan	8

== Attendances ==
=== Average home attendances ===
Pos	Team	Total	High	Low	Average	Change
1	Persepolis	557,000	85,000	0	39,786	−18.1%
2	Esteghlal	412,000	100,000	0	29,429	+6.3%
3	Sepahan	173,000	38,000	0	12,357	+45.5%
4	Tractor Sazi	165,200	45,000	1,000	11,013	+2.3%
5	Sepidrood	126,700	15,000	2,700	8,447	−9.9%
6	Padideh	111,700	35,000	1,000	7,447	+119.9%
7	Siah Jamegan	108,300	35,000	100	7,220	+73.7%
8	Pars Jonoubi Jam	105,000	16,000	2,000	7,000	+157.3%
9	Sanat Naft	97,000	13,000	2,500	6,467	+16.1%
10	Foolad	59,000	25,000	0	4,214	−22.4%
11	Saipa	46,450	27,000	150	3,097	+27.3%
12	Est. Khuzestan	44,700	20,000	100	2,980	−17.8%
13	Naft Tehran	43,880	23,000	100	2,925	+40.6%
14	Zob Ahan	42,100	15,000	300	2,807	+29.4%
15	Paykan	33,757	15,000	200	2,250	+0.1%
16	Gostaresh	12,262	5,000	100	817	−19.7%
	League total	2,138,049	100,000	0	9,060	+12.0%

Updated to games played on 27 April 2018
Source: Iranleague.ir
Notes:
Matches with spectator bans are not included in average attendances
Pars Jonoubi Jam and Sepidrood played last season in Azadegan League

=== Attendances by round ===
Team/Round	1	2	3	4	5	6	7	8	9	10	11	12	13	14	15	16	17	18	19	20	21	22	23	24	25	26	27	28	29	30	Average
Esteghlal	A	26,000	61,000	A	18,000	A	22,000	A	30,000	A	18,000	A	NC	A	25,000	15,000	A	A	33,000	A	24,000	A	15,000	A	100,000	A	15,000	A	10,000	A	29,429
Esteghlal Khuzestan	200	A	500	A	700	A	200	A	15,000	A	200	A	500	A	2,000	A	20,000	A	500	A	500	A	3,000	A	300	A	100	A	1,000	A	2,980
Foolad	A	500	A	2,000	A	1,000	A	1,000	A	2,000	A	3,000	A	3,000	A	25,000	A	3,000	A	3,000	A	4,000	A	10,000	A	NC	A	500	A	1,000	4,214
Gostaresh	150	A	200	A	2,102	A	A	2,200	A	300	A	300	A	300	A	A	100	A	350	A	410	250	A	300	A	150	A	5,000	A	150	817
Naft Tehran	1,500	A	23,000	A	A	500	A	280	A	100	A	200	A	200	A	A	500	A	1,500	100	A	100	A	500	A	15,000	A	200	A	200	2,925
Padideh	A	1,800	A	2,200	A	2,200	A	A	5,000	A	8,000	A	1,000	A	3,000	1,000	A	2,000	A	35,000	A	12,000	1,000	A	2,500	A	30,000	A	5,000	A	7,447
Pars Jonoubi Jam	A	8,000	A	12,000	A	16,000	A	8,000	A	A	10,000	A	15,000	A	4,000	5,000	A	3,000	A	5,000	A	2,000	A	5,000	3,000	A	7,000	A	2,000	A	7,000
Paykan	500	A	500	A	500	A	800	A	300	2,000	A	200	A	10,000	A	A	257	A	1,000	A	15,000	A	200	A	A	1,000	A	1,000	A	500	2,250
Persepolis	30,000	A	A	42,000	A	32,000	A	17,000	A	85,000	A	18,000	A	30,000	A	A	70,000	NC	A	25,000	A	50,000	A	15,000	A	60,000	A	15,000	A	68,000	39,786
Saipa	A	600	A	27,000	2,350	A	900	A	2,300	A	11,000	A	150	A	300	600	A	200	A	A	300	A	200	A	150	A	200	A	200	A	3,097
Sanat Naft	10,000	A	5,000	A	5,000	A	6,000	A	5,000	A	6,000	A	8,000	7,000	A	A	8,000	A	8,000	A	6,000	A	13,000	A	2,500	A	2,500	A	A	5,000	6,467
Sepahan	12,000	A	12,000	A	8,000	A	38,000	A	6,000	A	3,000	NC	A	10,000	A	A	7,500	A	15,000	A	7,500	A	2,000	A	10,000	A	A	7,000	A	35,000	12,357
Sepidrood	A	3,000	A	6,000	A	2,700	A	6,000	A	7,000	A	5,000	A	A	15,000	5,000	A	10,000	A	10,000	A	15,000	A	7,000	A	10,000	A	15,000	10,000	A	8,447
Siah Jamegan	1,000	A	3,000	A	1,650	A	600	750	A	10,000	A	30,000	A	2,000	A	A	3,000	A	35,000	A	12,000	A	A	8,000	A	1,100	A	100	A	100	7,220
Tractor Sazi	A	45,000	A	14,000	A	15,100	14,000	A	10,000	A	5,000	A	1,500	A	3,100	2,000	A	38,000	A	1,500	A	A	3,000	A	7,000	A	5,000	A	1,000	A	11,013
Zob Ahan	A	500	A	4,500	A	600	A	300	A	2,000	A	A	500	A	700	900	A	300	A	1,000	A	15,000	A	300	A	1,500	2,000	A	12,000	A	2,807
Total	55,350	85,400	105,200	109,700	38,302	70,100	82,500	18,530	73,600	108,400	61,200	56,700	26,650	62,500	53,100	54,500	109,357	56,500	94,350	80,600	65,710	98,350	37,400	46,100	125,450	88,750	61,800	43,800	41,200	109,950	2,138,049
Average	6,919	10,675	13,150	13,713	4,788	8,763	10,313	2,647	9,200	13,550	7,650	8,100	3,807	7,813	6,638	6,813	13,670	8,071	11,794	10,075	8,214	12,294	4,675	5,763	15,681	12,679	7,725	5,475	5,150	13,744	9,060

Notes:
Updated to games played on 27 April 2018. Source: Iranleague.ir
Matches with spectator bans are not included in average attendances
Gostaresh played their match against Pars Jonoubi Jam at Sahand
Saipa played their matches against Esteghlal and Persepolis at Takhti Tehran
Zob Ahan played their matches against Foolad, Naft Tehran, Pars Jonoubi Jam, Paykan, Sanat Naft and Siah Jamegan at Naghsh-e Jahan

=== Highest attendances ===
Rank	Home team	Score	Away team	Attendance	Date	Week	Stadium
1	Esteghlal	1–0	Persepolis	100,000	1 March 2018	25	Azadi
2	Persepolis	1–0	Esteghlal	85,000	26 October 2017	10	Azadi
3	Persepolis	2–0	Tractor Sazi	70,000	29 December 2017	17	Azadi
4	Persepolis	3–0	Sepidrood	68,000	27 April 2018	30	Azadi
5	Esteghlal	1–0	Tractor Sazi	61,000	11 August 2017	3	Azadi
6	Persepolis	1–2	Saipa	60,000	29 March 2018	26	Azadi
7	Persepolis	2–0	Sepahan	50,000	2 February 2018	22	Azadi
8	Tractor Sazi	1–2	Persepolis	45,000	3 August 2017	2	Sahand
9	Persepolis	1–1	Siah Jamegan	42,000	16 August 2017	4	Azadi
10	Sepahan	2–2	Persepolis	38,000	21 September 2017	7	Naghsh-e Jahan

Notes:
Updated to games played on 27 April 2018. Source: Iranleague.ir

== Awards ==
=== IFLO Seasonal awards ===
	Recipient
Best Player	(Iran) Vahid Amiri (Persepolis)
Best Young Player	(Iran) Ali Gholizadeh (Saipa)
Fair Player	(Iran) Mehdi Shiri (Paykan)
Best Goalkeeper	(Iran) Alireza Beiranvand (Persepolis)
Best Defender	(Iran) Jalal Hosseini (Persepolis)
Best Midfielder	(Iran) Omid Ebrahimi (Esteghlal)
Best Passor	(Uzbekistan) Server Djeparov (Esteghlal)
Best Goalscorer	(Iran) Ali Alipour (Persepolis)
Best Coach	(Croatia) Branko Ivanković (Persepolis)
Best Football Club	(Iran) Persepolis

=== Navad Monthly awards ===
Month	Manager of the Month		Player of the Month		References
Month	Manager	Club	Player	Club	References
Mordad	(Iran) Mehdi Tartar	Pars Jonoubi Jam	(Iran) Mehdi Kiani	Tractor Sazi	
Shahrivar	(Iran) Majid Jalali	Paykan	(Iran) Ali Alipour	Persepolis	
Mehr	(Iran) Majid Jalali	Paykan	(Iran) Ali Alipour	Persepolis	
Aban	(Croatia) Branko Ivanković	Persepolis	(Iran) Jalal Hosseini	Persepolis	
Azar	(Croatia) Branko Ivanković	Persepolis	(Iran) Jalal Hosseini	Persepolis	
Dey	(Iran) Amir Ghalenoei	Zob Ahan	(Iran) Hossein Hosseini	Esteghlal	
Bahman	(Germany) Winfried Schäfer	Esteghlal	(Iran) Vouria Ghafouri	Esteghlal	
Esfand	(Germany) Winfried Schäfer	Esteghlal	(Iran) Vouria Ghafouri	Esteghlal	
Farvardin	(Iran) Amir Ghalenoei	Zob Ahan	(Iran) Mehdi Torabi	Saipa	
Ordibehesht	(Iran) Amir Ghalenoei	Zob Ahan	(Iran) Mehdi Torabi	Saipa	

== See also ==
- 2017–18 Azadegan League
- 2016–17 League 2
- 2016–17 League 3
- 2017–18 Hazfi Cup
- 2017 Iranian Super Cup
