= Mohammad Javad Mohammadi =

Iranian association football player

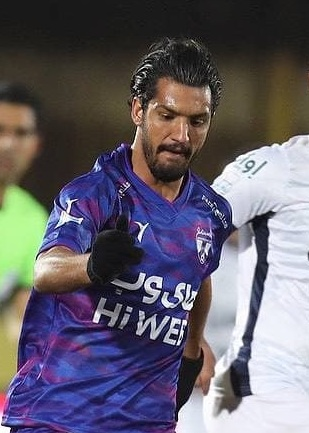

Personal information
- Full name: Mohammad Javad Mohammadi Marzroudi
- Date of birth: June 19, 1996 (age 30)
- Place of birth: Sari, Iran
- Height: 1.83 m (6 ft 0 in)
- Position: Forward

Team information
- Current team: Zob Ahan
- Number: 7

Youth career
- 2015–2017: Haf Semnan

Senior career*
Years	Team	Apps	(Gls)
2017–2019	Esteghlal	0	(0)
2018–2019	→ Arvand Karun (loan)	19	(4)
2019–2020	Rayka Babol	15	(0)
2020–2023	Havadar	69	(12)
2023–2024	Zob Ahan	29	(8)
2024–2025	Foolad	16	(1)
2025	→ Kheybar Khorramabad (loan)	13	(4)
2025–	Zob Ahan	19	(0)
2026	→ Malavan (loan)	6	(2)
- * Club domestic league appearances and goals as of 8 November 2023

Mohammad Javad Mohammadi (Persian: محمدجواد محمدی; born June 19, 1996) is an Iranian footballer who plays as a forward for Iranian club Zob Ahan in the Persian Gulf Pro League.
