= Mohsen Karimi =

Iranian professional footballer (born 1994)

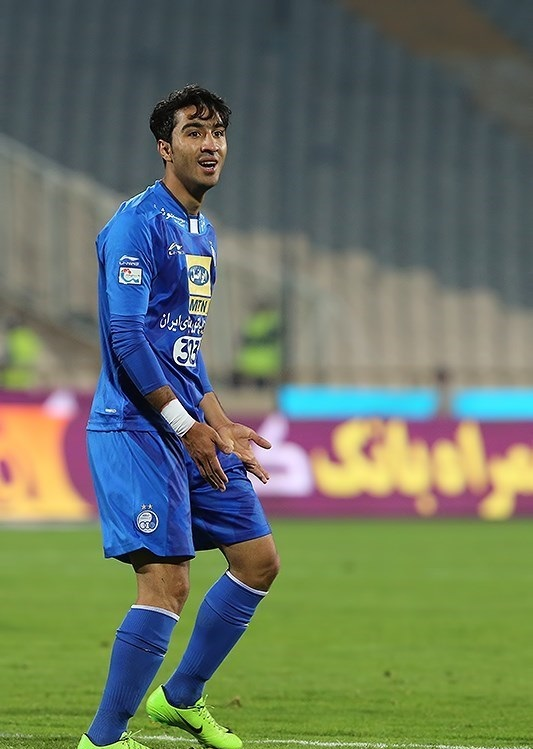
- Karimi in 2017

Personal information
- Full name: Seyed Mohsen Karimi Kiyasari
- Date of birth: 20 September 1994 (age 32)
- Place of birth: Sari, Iran
- Height: 1.72 m (5 ft 7 1/2 in)
- Position: Winger

Team information
- Current team: Nassaji
- Number: 70

Youth career
- 2008–2009: Padideh Sari
- 2012–2014: Esteghlal

Senior career*
Years	Team	Apps	(Gls)
2014–2019	Esteghlal	56	(11)
2020	Gol Gohar Sirjan	7	(0)
2021–	Nassaji	2	(0)

International career^{‡}
2015–2016	Iran U23	3	(0)
- * Club domestic league appearances and goals as of 24 December 2017 ‡ National team caps and goals as of 22 January 2016

Seyed Mohsen Karimi Kiyasari (Persian: سید محسن کریمی کیاسری, born 20 September 1994 in Sari) is an Iranian professional footballer who was playing for Nassaji in the Persian Gulf Pro League.

== Club career ==
=== Esteghlal ===
==== Early career ====
Karimi started his career at the age of 14 in Padideh Sari. He then left the club after a year and trained with a personal trainer for two years before joining Esteghlal in 2012. During the 2012–13 season, he was part of Esteghlal U17 side and managed to finish the season as the top scorer of the Iranian U17 league. Karimi then joined Esteghlal reserve the next season where he finished as the top scorer once more. He also scored two goals against Persepolis reserve in the Under 21 derby on 3 January 2015.

==== 2014–15 season ====
As a result of Karimi's impressive performances with Esteghlal reserve, he was called up to the senior team by manager Amir Ghalenoei. He made his professional debut in the match against Naft Tehran, coming on as a substitute in the 88th minute for Yaghoub Karimi. On 1 May 2015, he was included in Esteghlal's starting line up against Saba Qom for the first time. He finished his first season with the senior team with only 6 appearances in the league mostly as a substitute.

==== 2015–16 season ====
After the appointment of Parviz Mazloumi as Esteghlal's new manager, he firmly established Karimi in the starting line up. Karimi played his first game of the season in a 2–1 victory over Siah jamegan.

==== 2017–18 season ====
After missing the first half of the season due to injury, he returned to action for the Hazfi Cup match against Iranjavan coming on as a 68th-minute substitute for Farshid Esmaeili. On 25 December 2017, he scored a hat-trick for Esteghlal in a 4–0 win against Sanat Naft.

== Career statistics ==
As of 26 October 2020

Club performance			League		Cup		Continental		Total	
Season	Club	League	Apps	Goals	Apps	Goals	Apps	Goals	Apps	Goals
Iran			PGPL		Hazfi Cup		Asia		Total	
2014–15	Esteghlal	Iran Pro League	6	0	0	0	–	–	6	0
2015–16	Esteghlal	Iran Pro League	23	5	3	0	–	–	26	5
2016–17	Esteghlal	Iran Pro League	14	3	2	1	7	1	23	5
2017–18	Esteghlal	Iran Pro League	5	3	1	0	0	0	6	3
2018–19	Esteghlal	Iran Pro League	4	0	0	0	0	0	4	0
2019–20	Esteghlal	Iran Pro League	4	0	0	0	0	0	4	0
Career total			56	11	6	1	7	1	71	13

== Honours ==
Esteghlal

- Hazfi Cup: 2017–18
