= Erfan Afraz =

Iranian footballer

Personal information
- Full name: Erfan Afraz
- Date of birth: April 30, 1995 (age 31)
- Place of birth: Behbahan, Iran
- Height: 1.80 m (5 ft 11 in)
- Position: Forward

Team information
- Current team: Naft va Gaz Gachsaran F.C.
- Number: 20

Senior career*
Years	Team	Apps	(Gls)
2017	Gostaresh Foulad F.C.	11	(1)
2018	Machine Sazi F.C.	13	(1)
2020	Gol Gohar Sirjan F.C.	3	(0)
2022	Fajr Sepasi Shiraz F.C.	3	(0)
2023-present	Naft va Gaz Gachsaran F.C.	7	(1)
- * Club domestic league appearances and goals as of 25 February 2024

Erfan Afraz (Persian: عرفان افراز; born April 30, 1999) is an Iranian footballer who plays as a forward for Iranian club Naft va Gaz Gachsaran in the Azadegan League.

== Club career ==
He has a history of playing in the Persian Gulf Pro League with the teams of Gostaresh Foulad, Machine Sazi, Gol Gohar Sirjan and Fajr Sepasi Shiraz.
