= Bojan Najdenov =

Macedonian association football player

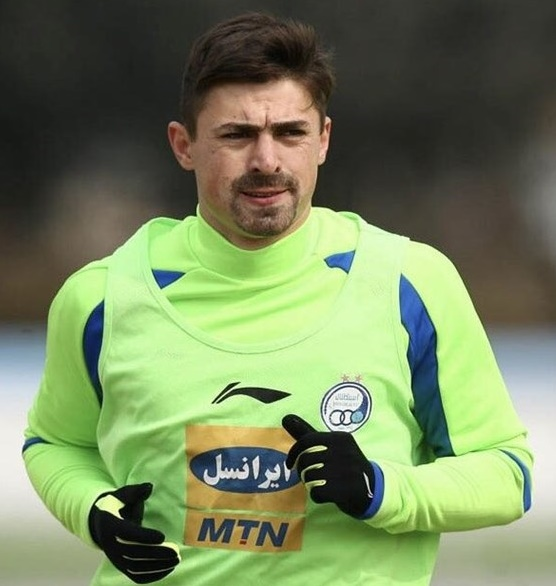

Personal information
- Full name: Bojan Najdenov; Бојан Најденов
- Date of birth: August 27, 1991 (age 35)
- Place of birth: SFR Yugoslavia
- Height: 1.83 m (6 ft 0 in)
- Position: Midfielder

Senior career*
Years	Team	Apps	(Gls)
2011–2015	Turnovo	128	(8)
2012	→ Miravci (loan)		
2015–2017	Rabotnički	42	(6)
2017–2018	Smouha	4	(0)
2018	Esteghlal	4	(0)
2018–2019	Laçi	18	(1)
2020–2021	Vardar	30	(0)
2021	Navbahor	13	(2)
2022	Iskra	6	(0)
2022	Akademija Pandev	11	(0)
2023	Lokomotiv Tashkent	14	(2)

International career
2014–2016	Macedonia	4	(0)
- * Club domestic league appearances and goals

Bojan Najdenov (born August 27, 1991), is a Macedonian footballer who plays as a midfielder for Lokomotiv Tashkent of the Uzbekistan Pro League.

== Club career ==
Bojan was a player of Horizont Turnovo In 2010–2015, in which he played in the Macedonian First League of 128 matches and scored eight goals. In the first round of the 2012/2013 season he was on loan in the Macedonian Second League of Miravci.

In 2015–2016 he performed in Rabotnički Skopje. In the 2016/2017 season, in which he won the bronze medal of the Macedonian First League with his club, he played 30 matches and scored four goals in meetings with: Makedonija Ǵórcze Petrow Skopje (4: 0–10 August 2016, 2: 1–15 October 2016), Pobeda Prilep (1: 2–28 September 2016, 3: 1–30 November 2016). In the 2017/2018 season he appeared in four qualifying matches for the Europa League, in which he scored three goals.

At the end of August 2017, he joined Smouha SC. He played four matches in the Egyptian Premier League. In January 2018 he was tested in Korona Kielce (played in two sparrings), with which he was in the preparatory camp in Turkey. However, he was not a player of the Kielce club.

=== Esteghlal ===
On 5 February 2018, Najdenov signed a one-and-a-half-year contract with the Iranian club Esteghlal.

== International career ==
He first made his mark on the international scene with Macedonia national team at the 18 June 2014 in an international friendly game against China. As of April 2020, he has earned a total of 4 caps, scoring no goals.

== Style of play ==
Najdenov is a deep-lying playmaker, who is 'distinguished by his accurate long-range shooting', his passes, and 'tactical performance and defensive security'.

== Honours ==
=== Club ===
Esteghlal

- Hazfi Cup: 2017–18
