= Saba Tavadze =

Georgian footballer

Personal information
- Full name: Saba Tavadze
- Date of birth: February 14, 1993 (age 33)
- Place of birth: Tbilisi, Georgia
- Height: 1.79 m (5 ft 10 in)
- Position: Midfielder

Senior career*
Years	Team	Apps	(Gls)
2013–2014	Hirnyk Sport	8	(1)
2014–2015	Meshakhte	16	(2)
2015–2016	Sapovnela	4	(1)
2016–2017	Shevardeni	3	(0)
2017	Dinamo Tbilisi	0	(0)
2017	Esteghlal Khuzestan	9	(0)
- * Club domestic league appearances and goals as of 17 September 2017 ‡ National team caps and goals as of 6 March 2017

Saba Tavadze is a Georgian Football midfielder who currently plays for Iranian football club Esteghlal Khuzestan in the Persian Gulf Pro League.
