= Magno (footballer, born 1988) =

Brazilian footballer

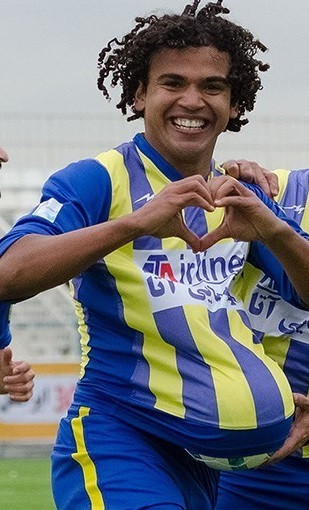

Personal information
- Full name: Magno Batista Da Silva
- Date of birth: 21 September 1985 (age 41)
- Place of birth: Coruripe, Brazil
- Height: 1.77 m (5 ft 10 in)
- Position: Midfielder

Senior career*
| Years | Team | Apps | (Gls) |
| 2007 | Universal Futebol Clube | | |
| 2007–2009 | CSA | | |
| 2009–2010 | Atlético Juventus | | |
| 2010 | Grêmio Barueri | | |
| 2011 | Santo André | 11 | (0) |
| 2011–2012 | Damash Gilan | 28 | (0) |
| 2012–2013 | Naft Tehran | 21 | (0) |
| 2013–2014 | Novo Hamburgo | 13 | (0) |
| 2014–2017 | Gostaresh Foulad | 82 | (6) |
| 2017–2018 | Sanat Naft Abadan | 28 | (2) |
| 2018–2019 | Paykan | 25 | (0) |
| 2019–2020 | Pars Jonoubi | 19 | (0) |
- * Club domestic league appearances and goals

Magno Batista da Silva (born 21 September 1988), known as just Magno, is a Brazilian former professional footballer who played as a midfielder.

== Career ==
In 2011, Magno played 11 games for Esporte Clube Santo André. In June 2011, he transferred to Damash in the Iran Pro League. In the summer of 2012 he signed a one-year contract with Naft Tehran. He returned to Brazil in 2013 and signed with Novo Hamburgo.

He returned to Iran in the summer of 2014 and signed a two-year contract with Persian Gulf Pro League side Gostaresh Foulad. After settling in well with the club, Magno was received a two-year contract extension to the end of the 2017–18 season.
