= Takhti Stadium (Abadan) =

Sports stadium in Khuzestan, Iran

Coordinates: 30°20′22″N 48°17′32″E

Takhti
- Sanate naft stadium
- Interactive map of Takhti
- Former names: Reza II Pahlavi Stadium; Amir Kabir Stadium
- Location: Eastern berim road, Abadan, Khoozestan, Iran
- Owner: Sanat Naft Abadan F.C.
- Operator: Sanat Naft Abadan F.C.
- Capacity: 20,000 (Football)
- Surface: Grass

Construction
- Opened: 1915

Tenant
- Sanat Naft Abadan F.C.

The Abadan Takhti Stadium (Persian: ورزشگاه تختى آبادان, Varzeshgāh-e Taxti-ye Ābādān) is a multi-purpose stadium built in Abadan, Khuzestan province, Iran. It is currently used mostly for football matches and is the home stadium of Sanat Naft Abadan F.C. who play in the Persian Gulf Pro League. The stadium holds 10,000 people.
