= Ali Ghorbani (footballer, born 1990) =

Iranian footballer (born 1990)

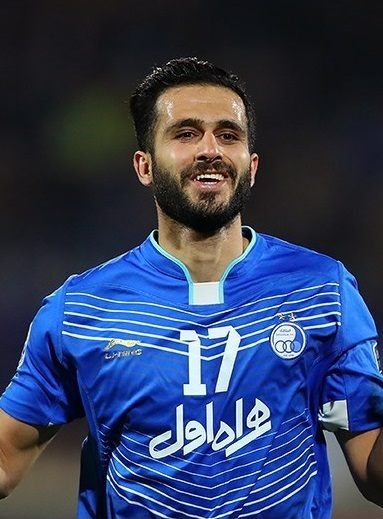
- Ghorbani with Esteghlal in 2017

Personal information
- Date of birth: 18 September 1990 (age 36)
- Place of birth: Savadkouh, Iran
- Height: 1.93 m (6 ft 4 in)
- Position: Forward

Youth career
- 2002–2004: Shohada-ye Zirab
- 2004–2006: Gheyrat Zirab
- 2006–2009: Parvin Ghaemshahr
- 2009–2011: Nassaji

Senior career*
Years	Team	Apps	(Gls)
2010–2011	Nassaji	18	(3)
2011–2012	Gahar Zagros	23	(7)
2012–2013	Mes Sarcheshmeh	17	(3)
2013–2016	Naft Tehran	61	(16)
2016–2018	Esteghlal	55	(13)
2018–2019	Spartak Trnava	9	(2)
2019–2020	Sepahan	37	(4)
2020–2022	Sumgayit	42	(14)
2022–2023	Foolad	11	(1)
2024	Paykan	15	(4)
2024–2025	Gol Gohar	10	(1)

International career^{‡}
2020–2023	Azerbaijan	8	(0)
- * Club domestic league appearances and goals as of 16 April 2025 ‡ National team caps and goals as of 10 October 2020

Ali Ghorbani (Azerbaijani: Əli Qurbani, Persian: علی قربانی; born 18 September 1990) is a professional footballer who plays as a forward for Gol Gohar in the Persian Gulf Pro League. Born in Iran, he plays for the Azerbaijan national team.

== Club career ==
Ghorbani started his professional career with Nassaji Mazandaran. Later he joined Gahar Zagros and reunited with his former coach Davoud Mahabadi, helping them secure promotion to Iran Pro League with scoring seven times in Azadegan League. After a successful season in Gahar, he joined Mes Sarcheshmeh. In July 2013, he joined Naft Tehran on a two-year contract.

=== Esteghlal ===
Ghorbani joined Sepidrood in summer 2016. He was coached by Alireza Mansourian at Naft Tehran and when Mansorian went to Esteghlal, Ghorbani was one of his new players.

=== Spartak Trnava ===
On 3 September 2018, Ghorbani joined Slovak side Spartak Trnava on a two-year contract.

=== Sepahan ===
In the summer of 2019, he joined Iranian Club Sepahan. After getting knocked out by former team Esteghlal on 10 August 2020, he and a few other club members were sacked by the club.

=== Sumgayit ===
On 14 August 2020, he signed a one-year contract with Azerbaijan Premier League club Sumgayit.

== International career ==
Ali Ghorbani was born in the Mazandaran province of Iran and originally is a mazani from Kerdabad village in Savadkouh. On 2 October 2020, Ghorbani was called up Azerbaijan by Gianni De Biasi.

He made his official debut for Azerbaijan on 10 October 2020, against Montenegro in a UEFA Nations League match.

== Career statistics ==
=== Club ===
As of 7 September 2019

Appearances and goals by club, season and competition
Club	Season	League			Cup		Continental		Total	
Club	Season	Division	Apps	Goals	Apps	Goals	Apps	Goals	Apps	Goals
Nassaji Mazandaran	2010–11	Division 1	18	3	0	0	–	–	18	3
Gahar Zagros	2011–12	Division 1	23	7	3	1	–	–	26	8
Mes Sarcheshmeh	2012–13	Division 1	17	3	1	0	–	–	18	3
Naft Tehran	2013–14	Pro League	24	6	1	1	–	–	25	7
Naft Tehran	2014–15	Pro League	17	5	3	1	3	1	23	7
Naft Tehran	2015–16	Pro League	20	5	1	0	1	0	22	5
Naft Tehran	Total		61	16	5	2	4	1	70	19
Esteghlal	2016–17	Pro League	28	6	3	1	8	1	39	8
Esteghlal	2017–18	Pro League	27	7	5	2	8	1	40	10
Esteghlal	Total		55	13	8	3	16	2	79	18
Spartak Trnava	2018–19	Slovak First Football League	9	2	3	1	5	1	17	4
Sepahan	2018–19	Pro League	15	2	0	0	–	–	15	2
Sepahan	2019–20	Pro League	22	2	3	1	2	0	27	3
Sepahan	Total		37	4	3	1	2	0	42	6
Sumgayit	2020–21	Azerbaijani Premier League	19	9	5	1	1	0	25	10
Sumgayit	2021–22	Azerbaijani Premier League	23	5	2	0	2	0	27	5
Sumgayit	Total		42	14	7	1	3	0	52	15
Foolad	2022–23	Persian Gulf Pro League	11	1	0	0	0	0	11	1
Paykan	2023–24	Persian Gulf Pro League	6	2	0	0	0	0	6	2
Career total			279	65	30	9	30	4	339	78

=== International ===
Azerbaijan
Year	Apps	Goals
2020	2	0
Total	2	0

Statistics accurate as of match played 10 October 2020

== Honours ==
Esteghlal

- Hazfi Cup: 2017–18

Spartak Trnava

- Slovnaft Cup: 2018–19
