= Abolfazl Alaei =

Iranian footballer

Personal information
- Full name: Abolfazl Alaei
- Date of birth: September 22, 1994 (age 32)
- Place of birth: Golpayegan, Iran
- Height: 1.86 m (6 ft 1 in)
- Position: Midfielder

Team information
- Current team: Pars Jonoubi
- Number: 30

Youth career
- –2015: Foolad Yazd

Senior career*
Years	Team	Apps	(Gls)
2015–2016	Foolad Yazd	26	(1)
2016–2018	Esteghlal Khuzestan	20	(0)
2018	Nassaji Mazandaran	8	(0)
2019–	Pars Jonoubi	0	(0)
2019–2021	Fajr Sepasi Shiraz F.C.		
2021	Sanat Mes Kerman F.C.		
2021-2022	Shahin Bushehr F.C.		
2022	Qashqai F.C.		
2022	Esteghlal Khuzestan F.C.		
- * Club domestic league appearances and goals as of 30 December 2016 ‡ National team caps and goals as of 17 January 2017

Abolfazl Alaei is an Iranian football midfielder who currently plays for Iranian football club Pars Jonoubi in the Persian Gulf Pro League.
