= 2018–19 Esteghlal F.C. season =

Esteghlal F.C.
2018–19 season
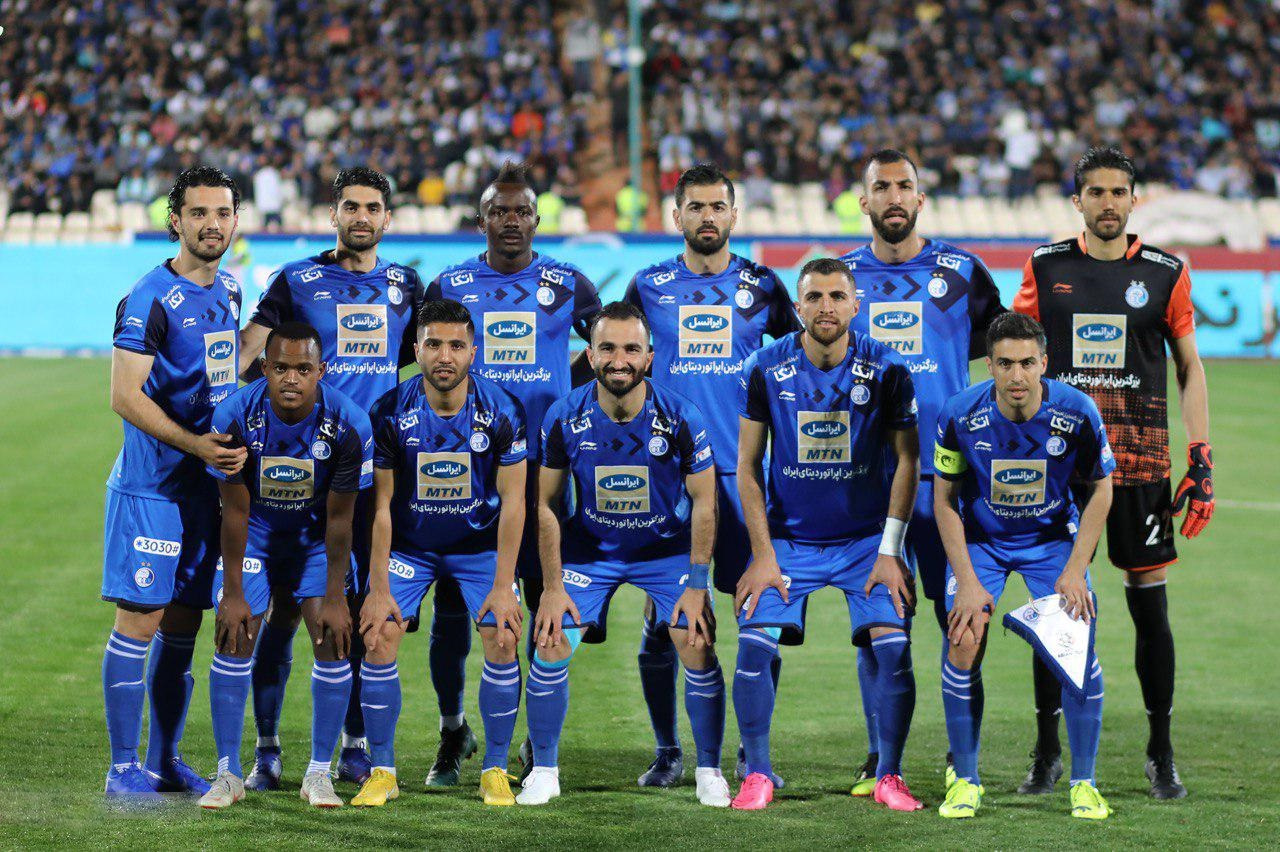
- President: Ahmadreza Fathi
- Head coach: Winfried Schäfer (until 29 April); Farhad Majidi (from 29 April)
- Stadium: Azadi Stadium
- Iran Pro League: 3rd
- Hazfi Cup: Round of 16
- Super Cup: Runners-up
- 2018 AFC Champions League: Quarter-finals
- 2019 AFC Champions League: Group-stage
- Top goalscorer: League: Morteza Tabrizi (5); All: Morteza Tabrizi (7)
- Highest home attendance: 78,000 (vs Tractor Sazi, 10 August 2018)
- Lowest home attendance: 9,500 (vs Esteghlal Khuzestan, 8 May 2019)
- Average home league attendance: 29,033
Home colours	Away colours

The 2018–19 season was the Esteghlal Football Club's 18th season in the Iran Pro League, and their 25nd consecutive season in the top division of Iranian football. They also competed in the Hazfi Cup, and 73rd year in existence as a football club.

== Players ==
=== First team squad ===
Players and squad numbers last updated on 6 June 2018.

No.	Name	Nat	Position	Date of Birth (Age)	Since	End	Signed from
Goalkeepers
1	Mehdi Rahmati (Captain)	(Iran)	GK	2 February 1983 (aged 35)	2015	2019	(Iran) Paykan
19	Mehdi Nourollahi	(Iran)	GK	24 March 1997 (aged 21)	2018	2021	Youth system
22	Hossein Hosseini	(Iran)	GK	30 June 1992 (aged 26)	2012	2019	Youth system
Defenders
2	Khosro Heydari (2nd VC)	(Iran)	RB / RM / LB	14 September 1983 (aged 35)	2011	2019	(Iran) Sepahan
3	Milad Zakipour	(Iran)	LB / LM	23 November 1995 (aged 23)	2016	2021	(Iran) Naft Tehran
12	Meysam Teymouri	(Iran)	LB	6 July 1992 (aged 26)	2018	2021	(Iran) Pars Jonoubi
13	Armin Sohrabian	(Iran)	LB / CB	26 July 1995 (aged 23)	2017	2019	(Iran) Sepahan
21	Vouria Ghafouri	(Iran)	RB / RW	20 September 1987 (aged 31)	2016	2019	(Iran) Sepahan
33	Pejman Montazeri (3rd VC)	(Iran)	CB / RB	6 September 1983 (aged 35)	2017	2019	(Qatar) Al Ahli
44	Farshad Mohammadi	(Iran)	RB / RW	4 September 1994 (aged 24)	2018	2021	(Iran) Pars Jonoubi
70	Mohammad Daneshgar	(Iran)	CB	20 January 1994 (aged 24)	2018	2020	(Iran) Saipa
Midfielders
4	Roozbeh Cheshmi	(Iran)	CB / DM	24 July 1993 (aged 25)	2015	2019	(Iran) Saba Qom
5	Ayanda Patosi	(South Africa)	AM / LW	31 October 1992 (aged 26)	2019	2019	(South Africa) Cape Town
6	Ali Karimi	(Iran)	CM / DM	11 February 1994 (aged 24)	2018	2019	(Iran) Sepahan
8	Farshid Esmaeili	(Iran)	AM / LW / RW	23 February 1994 (aged 24)	2015	2020	(Iran) Fajr Sepasi
14	Farshid Bagheri	(Iran)	DM / CM	5 June 1992 (aged 26)	2016	2020	(Iran) Saba Qom
17	Humam Tariq	(Iraq)	LW / RW / AM	10 February 1996 (aged 22)	2018	2021	(Iraq) Al-Quwa Al-Jawiya
23	Dariush Shojaeian	(Iran)	RW / LW / AM	7 April 1992 (aged 26)	2017	2020	(Iran) Gostaresh Foulad
28	Mohsen Karimi	(Iran)	LW / RW / SS	20 September 1994 (aged 24)	2014	2020	Youth system
30	Omid Noorafkan	(Iran)	DM / LB	9 April 1997 (aged 21)	2019	2019	(Belgium) Charleroi
77	Reza Azari	(Iran)	AM / CM	10 February 1998 (aged 20)	2018	2023	Youth system
88	Reza Karimi	(Iran)	RW / LW / SS	23 August 1998 (aged 20)	2018	2021	(Albania) Skënderbeu Korçë
Forwards
10	Rouhollah Bagheri	(Iran)	CF / RW	12 February 1991 (aged 27)	2018	2021	(Iran) Khooneh be Khooneh
11	Morteza Tabrizi	(Iran)	CF / LW	6 January 1991 (aged 27)	2018	2020	(Iran) Zob Ahan
16	Allahyar Sayyadmanesh	(Iran)	CF / RW / LW	29 June 2001 (aged 17)	2018	2023	(Iran) Saipa
20	Esmaël Gonçalves	(Guinea-Bissau)	CF / LW	25 June 1991 (aged 27)	2019	2020	(Uzbekistan) Pakhtakor
25	Mehdi Ghayedi	(Iran)	LW / RW	5 December 1998 (aged 20)	2017	2023	(Iran) Iranjavan
90	Godwin Mensha	(Nigeria)	CF / SS	2 September 1989 (aged 29)	2019	2020	(Iran) Persepolis
Players transferred during the season
7	Markus Neumayr	(Germany)	AM / CM	23 March 1986 (aged 32)	2018	2020	(Turkey) Kasımpaşa
9	Alhaji Gero	(Nigeria)	CF	10 October 1993 (aged 25)	2018	2021	(Sweden) Östersunds
24	Jaber Ansari	(Iran)	SS / AM / RW	10 January 1987 (aged 31)	2015	2019	(Iran) Gostaresh Foulad

=== Persian Gulf League Squad ===
Note: Flags indicate national team as defined under FIFA eligibility rules; some limited exceptions apply. Players may hold more than one non-FIFA nationality.

No.	Pos.	Nation	Player
1	GK	IRN	Mehdi Rahmati (captain)
2	DF	IRN	Khosro Heydari (vice-captain)
3	DF	IRN	Milad Zakipour
4	DF	IRN	Rouzbeh Cheshmi
5	MF	RSA	Ayanda Patosi
6	MF	IRN	Ali Karimi
8	MF	IRN	Farshid Esmaeili
10	FW	IRN	Rouhollah Bagheri
11	FW	IRN	Morteza Tabrizi
12	DF	IRN	Meysam Teymouri
13	DF	IRN	Armin Sohrabian
14	MF	IRN	Farshid Bagheri
16	FW	IRN	Allahyar Sayyadmanesh
17	MF	IRQ	Humam Tariq
18	DF	IRN	Shahin Taherkhani
19	GK	IRN	Mehdi Nourollahi
20	FW	GNB	Esmaël Gonçalves

No.	Pos.	Nation	Player
21	DF	IRN	Vouria Ghafouri
22	GK	IRN	Hossein Hosseini
23	MF	IRN	Dariush Shojaeian
25	FW	IRN	Mehdi Ghayedi
27	MF	IRN	Hossein Heydari
28	MF	IRN	Mohsen Karimi
30	MF	IRN	Omid Noorafkan
33	DF	IRN	Pejman Montazeri (third-captain)
43	DF	IRN	Amirhossein Kargar
44	DF	IRN	Farshad Mohammadi Mehr
70	DF	IRN	Mohammad Daneshgar
77	MF	IRN	Reza Azari
88	MF	IRN	Reza Karimi
90	FW	NGA	Godwin Mensha
99	FW	IRN	Sajjad Aghaei
—	FW	IRN	Meraj Pourtaghi
—	FW	IRN	Zakaria Moradi

=== 2018 AFC Champions League Squad ===
Note: Flags indicate national team as defined under FIFA eligibility rules; some limited exceptions apply. Players may hold more than one non-FIFA nationality.

No.	Pos.	Nation	Player
1	GK	IRN	Mehdi Rahmati (captain)
2	DF	IRN	Khosro Heydari (vice-captain)
4	MF	IRN	Roozbeh Cheshmi
8	MF	IRN	Farshid Esmaeili
12	FW	NGA	Alhaji Gero
13	DF	IRN	Armin Sohrabian
14	MF	IRN	Farshid Bagheri
16	MF	IRN	Mehdi Ghayedi
17	MF	IRQ	Humam Tariq
18	DF	IRN	Milad Zakipour
21	DF	IRN	Vouria Ghafouri
22	GK	IRN	Hossein Hosseini
27	MF	IRN	Hossein Heydari
29	DF	IRN	Amirhossein Esmaeilzadeh

No.	Pos.	Nation	Player
32	DF	IRN	Amirhossein Kargar
33	DF	IRN	Pejman Montazeri (third-captain)
37	MF	IRN	Reza Azari
39	FW	IRN	Allahyar Sayyadmanesh
44	DF	IRN	Farshad Mohammadi Mehr
49	DF	IRN	Shahin Taherkhani
60	MF	IRN	Ali Karimi
69	FW	IRN	Heydar Ali Ahmadzadeh
70	DF	IRN	Mohammad Daneshgar
71	MF	GER	Markus Neumayr
78	FW	IRN	Morteza Tabrizi
88	GK	IRN	Mehdi Nourollahi
91	FW	IRN	Rouhollah Bagheri
99	FW	IRN	Sajjad Aghaei

== Transfers ==
=== In ===
No.	Pos.	Nat.	Name	Age	Moving from	Type	Transfer window	Ends	Source
20	CF	(Iran)	Morteza Aghakhan	25	Peykan	Transfer	Summer	2021	
44	RB	(Iran)	Farshad Mohammadi	23	Pars Jonoubi	Transfer	Summer	2020	
10	CF	(Iran)	Rouhollah Bagheri	27	Khooneh be Khooneh	Transfer	Summer	2021	
70	CB	(Iran)	Mohammad Daneshgar	24	Saipa	Transfer	Summer	2020	
19	GK	(Iran)	Mehdi Nourollahi	21	Esteghlal Academy	Promoted	Summer	2021	
32	RB	(Iran)	Amirhossein Kargar	19	Esteghlal Academy	Promoted	Summer	2021	
45	DM	(Iran)	Sina Khadempour	21	Naft Tehran	End of loan	Summer	2021	
99	LW	(Iran)	Sajjad Aghaei	19	Aluminium Arak	End of loan	Summer	2021	
16	CF	(Iran)	Allahyar Sayyadmanesh	16	Saipa	Transfer	Summer	2023	
12	LB	(Iran)	Meysam Teymouri	25	Pars Jonoubi	Transfer	Summer	2021	
77	CM	(Iran)	Reza Azari	20	Esteghlal Academy	Promoted	Summer	2021	
18	CB	(Iran)	Shahin Taherkhani	21	Peykan U21	Transfer	Summer	2021	
6	CM	(Iran)	Ali Karimi	24	Sepahan	Transfer	Summer	2019	
11	LW	(Iran)	Morteza Tabrizi	27	Zob Ahan	Transfer	Summer	2020	
7	AM	(Germany)	Markus Neumayr	32	(Turkey) Kasımpaşa	Transfer	Summer	2020	
17	RW	(Iraq)	Humam Tariq	22	(Iraq) Al-Quwa Al-Jawiya	Transfer	Summer	2021	
9	CF	(Nigeria)	Alhaji Gero	24	(Sweden) Östersunds	Transfer	Summer	2021	
88	AM	(Iran)	Reza Karimi	20	(Albania) Skënderbeu Korçë	Transfer	Winter	2021	
20	CF	(Guinea-Bissau)	Esmaël Gonçalves	27	(Uzbekistan) Pakhtakor	Transfer	Winter	2020	
30	DM	(Iran)	Omid Noorafkan	21	(Belgium) Charleroi	Loan	Winter	2019	
43	LB	(Iran)	Amirhossein Pourmohammad	20	Esteghlal Academy	Transfer	Winter	2023	
38	CF	(Iran)	Meraj Pourtaghi	20	Esteghlal Academy	Transfer	Winter	2023	
17	RW	(Iran)	Zakaria Moradi	20	Esteghlal Academy	Transfer	Winter	2023	
5	AM	(South Africa)	Ayanda Patosi	26	(South Africa) Cape Town	Loan	Winter	2019	
90	CF	(Nigeria)	Godwin Mensha	29	Persepolis	Transfer	Winter	2020	

=== Out ===
No.	Pos.	Nat.	Name	Age	Moving to	Type	Transfer window	Source
90	CB	(Brazil)	Leandro Padovani Celin	34	Retired	End of contract	Summer	
24	DM	(Iran)	Omid Noorafkan	21	(Belgium) Charleroi	Transfer	Summer	
70	RW	(Iran)	Mohammad Javad Mohammadi	21	Arvand Khorramshahr	Loan	Summer	
13	LW	(Iran)	Miad Yazdani	25	Sepidrood Rasht	Transfer	Summer	
77	RW	(Iran)	Behnam Barzay	25	Sanat Naft	Transfer	Summer	
19	GK	(Iran)	Arshia Babazadeh	22	(Thailand) Surat Thani	Transfer	Summer	
	CM	(Iran)	Majid Tajik	21	Gol Reyhan	Transfer	Summer	
6	DM	(Iran)	Omid Ebrahimi	30	(Qatar) Al-Ahli	End of contract	Summer	
26	CF	(Iran)	Fardin Najafi	20	Baadraan	Loan	Summer	
20	AM	(Uzbekistan)	Server Djeparov	35	(Kazakhstan) Zhetysu	End of contract	Summer	
5	CB	(Iran)	Majid Hosseini	22	(Turkey) Trabzonspor	Transfer	Summer	
25	CF	(Senegal)	Mame Baba Thiam	25	(United Arab Emirates) Al-Ajman	Transfer	Summer	
80	CM	(North Macedonia)	Bojan Najdenov	26	(Albania) KF Laçi	Transfer	Summer	
9	CF	(Iran)	Ali Ghorbani	27	(Slovakia) Spartak Trnava	End of contract	Summer	
	DM	(Iran)	Amirhossein Sheikholeslami	19	(Portugal) Marítimo B	Transfer	Summer	
7	AM	(Germany)	Markus Neumayr	32	(Switzerland) Aarau	Transfer	Winter	
45	DM	(Iran)	Sina Khadempour	22	Gol Gohar	Loan	Winter	
24	RW	(Iran)	Jaber Ansari	32	Paykan	Transfer	Winter	
69	LW	(Iran)	Heydar Ali Ahmadzadeh	21	Shahrdari Mahshahr	Transfer	Winter	
9	CF	(Nigeria)	Alhaji Gero	25	(Sweden) Östersunds	Transfer	Winter	

== Pre-season and friendlies ==
7 July 2018 1	Esteghlal	2 – 1	Esteghlal U23	Tehran, Iran
18:20 IRDT (UTC+04:30)		Report

12 July 2018 2	Esteghlal (Iran)	0 – 1	(Ukraine) Mariupol	Kartepe, Turkey
17:00 Turkey Time (UTC+03:00)		Report

16 July 2018 3	Esteghlal (Iran)	2 – 2	(Morocco) FUS Rabat	Kartepe, Turkey
17:00 Turkey Time (UTC+03:00)		Report

18 July 2018 4	Bursaspor U23 (Turkey)	0 – 6	(Iran) Esteghlal	Kartepe, Turkey
16:30 Turkey Time (UTC+03:00)		Report

20 July 2018 5	Esteghlal (Iran)	2 – 0	(Turkmenistan) Nebitçi Balkanabat	Kartepe, Turkey
17:00 Turkey Time (UTC+03:00)		Report

14 October 2018 1	Esteghlal	2 – 1	Esteghlal Academy	Tehran, Iran
15:30 IRST (UTC+03:30)	F. Bagheri; M. Tabrizi	Report	M. Pourtaghi

== Competitions ==
=== Overview ===
Competition	First match	Last match	Starting round	Final position	Record							
Competition	First match	Last match	Starting round	Final position	Pld	W	D	L	GF	GA	GD	Win %
Pro League	27 July 2018	16 May 2019	—	3rd	30	16	9	5	40	13	+27	53.33
Hazfi Cup	2 October 2018	1 November 2018	Round of 32	Round of 16	2	1	1	0	3	2	+1	50.00
Super Cup	20 July 2018		Final	Runners-up	1	0	0	1	0	3	−3	0.00
2018 ACL	27 August 2018	17 September 2018	Quarter-finals	Quarter-finals	2	0	1	1	3	5	−2	0.00
2019 ACL	February 2019	20 May 2019	Group stage	Group stage	6	2	2	2	6	8	−2	33.33
Total					41	19	13	9	52	31	+21	46.34

Last updated: 21 May 2019.
Source: Competitions

=== Iran Pro League ===
==== Standings ====
Pos	Team	Pld	W	D	L	GF	GA	GD	Pts	Qualification or relegation
1	Persepolis (C)	30	16	13	1	36	14	+22	61	Qualification for 2020 AFC Champions League group stage
2	Sepahan	30	15	13	2	46	20	+26	58	Qualification for 2020 AFC Champions League group stage
3	Esteghlal	30	16	9	5	40	13	+27	57	Qualification for 2020 AFC Champions League Qualifying play-offs
4	Padideh	30	16	8	6	32	16	+16	56	Qualification for 2020 AFC Champions League Qualifying play-offs
5	Tractor Sazi	30	14	10	6	42	25	+17	52	

Source: IPL Table
Rules for classification: 1) Points; 2) Goal difference; 3) Goals scored.
(C) Champions

==== Results summary ====
Overall								Home						Away					
Pld	W	D	L	GF	GA	GD	Pts	W	D	L	GF	GA	GD	W	D	L	GF	GA	GD
30	16	9	5	40	13	+27	57	9	5	1	20	4	+16	7	4	4	20	9	+11

Last updated: 16 May 2019.
Source: Ipl Stats

==== Results by round ====
Round	1	2	3	4	5	6	7	8	9	10	11	12	13	14	15	16	17	18	19	20	21	22	23	24	25	26	27	28	29	30
Ground	H	A	H	A	H	A	A	H	A	H	A	H	A	H	A	A	H	A	H	A	H	H	A	H	A	H	A	H	A	H
Result	D	D	W	L	D	W	D	D	W	L	D	D	W	W	W	W	W	L	W	W	W	W	L	D	W	W	L	W	D	W
Position	7	9	4	7	8	10	11	7	5	7	8	8	6	5	5	5	5	5	4	4	3	2	4	4	3	2	3	2	3	3

Updated to match(es) played on 16 May 2019. Source: "Ipl".
A = Away; H = Home; W = Win; D = Draw; L = Loss; P = Postponed

==== Matches ====
27 July 2018 1	Esteghlal	0 – 0	Paykan	Tehran
20:45 IRDT (UTC+04:30)	F. Bagheri (yellow card) 23'; S. Aghaei (yellow card) 26'	Report	F. Emamali (yellow card) 5'; M. Batista (yellow card) 32'	Stadium: Azadi Stadium; Attendance: 28,000; Referee: Mouood Bonyadifar

2 August 2018 2	Zob Ahan	2 – 2	Esteghlal	Isfahan
20:45 IRDT (UTC+04:30)	R. Habibzadeh 24' (yellow card) 18'; E. Hernández 45'; M. Nejadmehdi (yellow card) 45'; V. Mohammadzadeh (yellow card) 59' (yellow-red card) 75'	Report	V. Ghafouri 43', 56'; M. Daneshgar (yellow card) 10' (yellow-red card) 90+1'; F. Mohammadi-Mehr (yellow card) 76'; A. Sohrabian (yellow card) 76'; A. Sayyadmanesh (yellow card) 85'	Stadium: Foolad Shahr Stadium; Attendance: 10,000; Referee: Bijan Heydari

10 August 2018 3	Esteghlal	3 – 0	Tractor Sazi	Tehran
20:30 IRDT (UTC+04:30)	A. Abdollahzadeh 13' (o.g.); M. Tabrizi 28'; F. Esmaeili 51'	Report		Stadium: Azadi Stadium; Attendance: 78,000; Referee: Mahdi Seyyed Ali

16 August 2018 4	Pars Jonoubi Jam	1 – 0	Esteghlal	Jam
20:33 IRDT (UTC+04:30)	A. Sohrabian 12' (o.g.); E. Salehi (yellow card) 56'; Nouri (yellow card) 70'; M. Lotfi (yellow card) 85'; H. Noormohammadi (yellow card) 90+5'	Report	M. Daneshgar (yellow card) 19'; A. Karimi (yellow card) 86'	Stadium: Takhti Stadium; Attendance: 15,000; Referee: Hossein Zargar

22 August 2018 5	Esteghlal	0 – 0	Foolad	Tehran
20:15 IRDT (UTC+04:30)	M. Daneshgar (yellow card) 34'	Report	E. Moradian (yellow card) 73'; M. Najjarian (yellow card) 78'	Stadium: Azadi Stadium; Attendance: 30,000; Referee: Koupal Nazemi

22 September 2018 7	Nassaji Mazandaran	0 – 0	Esteghlal	Qaem Shahr
19:32 IRST (UTC+03:30)	M. Abshak (yellow card) 25'; A. Abdollahzadeh (yellow card) 87'	Report	R. Bagheri (yellow card) 66'	Stadium: Vatani Stadium; Attendance: 15,000; Referee: Hossein Zargar

27 September 2018 8	Esteghlal	0 – 0	Persepolis	Tehran
18:30 IRST (UTC+03:30)	A. Sohrabian (yellow card) 25'; P. Montazeri (yellow card) 47'; R. Cheshmi (yellow card) 90+2'	Report	A. Nourollahi (yellow card) 75'; S. Khalilzadeh (yellow card) 90+1'	Stadium: Azadi Stadium; Attendance: 70,000; Referee: Alireza Faghani

6 October 2018 6	Naft Masjed Soleyman	1 – 2	Esteghlal	Masjed Soleyman
18:15 IRST (UTC+03:30)	H.Nassari 12' (pen.) (yellow card) 16'; E. Sharifat (yellow card) 7'; M. Ghaed Rahmati (yellow card) 65'; M. Coulibaly (red card) 73'; M. Hosseini (yellow card) 90'	Report	A. Sayyadmanesh 2' (yellow card) 25'; M. Ghayedi 29'; M. Zakipour (yellow card) 17' (yellow-red card) 47'; R. Bagheri (yellow card) 65'; F. Mohammadi Mehr (yellow card) 71'	Stadium: Behnam Mohammadi Stadium; Attendance: 10,000; Referee: Mahdi Seyyed Ali

19 October 2018 9	Saipa	1 – 2	Esteghlal	Tehran
15:32 IRST (UTC+03:30)	A. Dashti 7' (yellow card) 28'; M. Torabi (yellow card) 70'	Report	M. Daneshgar 23'; V. Ghafouri 81' (pen.); A. Sohrabian (yellow card) 70'	Stadium: Takhti Stadium; Attendance: 8,000; Referee: Mohammad Hossein Zahedifard

26 October 2018 10	Esteghlal	0 – 1	Sepahan	Tehran
16:45 IRST (UTC+03:30)	F. Bagheri (yellow card) 36'; F. Esmaeili (yellow card) 88'	Report	K. Stanlley 81'; M. Mohammadi (yellow card) 25'; M. Kiani (yellow card) 71'; E. Pourghaz (yellow card) 77'	Stadium: Azadi Stadium; Attendance: 37,000; Referee: Reza Kermanshahi

5 November 2018 11	Machine Sazi	0 – 0	Esteghlal	Tabriz
15:15 IRST (UTC+03:30)	A.Maboudi (yellow card) 89'	Report		Stadium: Bonyan Diesel Stadium; Attendance: 7,000

13 December 2018 12	Esteghlal	0 – 0	Padideh	Tehran
16:15 IRST (UTC+03:30)	M. Daneshgar (yellow card) 11'; M. Zakipour (yellow card) 29'; A. Sayyad (yellow card) 84' (yellow-red card) 88'	Report	H. Mehraban (yellow card) 11'; A. Nemati (yellow card) 53'; M. Khalatbari (yellow card) 57'	Stadium: Azadi Stadium; Attendance: 50,000; Referee: Mohammad Hossein Zahedifard

25 November 2018 13	Esteghlal Khuzestan	0 – 1	Esteghlal	Ahvaz
17:35 IRST (UTC+03:30)	M.Shahmakvandzadeh (yellow card) 54'	Report	R.Bagheri 29'; F. Bagheri (yellow card) 25'; F. Esmaeili (yellow card) 57'; F. Mohammadi (yellow card) 58'	Stadium: Ghadir Stadium; Attendance: 8,000

29 November 2018 14	Esteghlal	3 – 0	Sanat Naft	Tehran
17:33 IRST (UTC+03:30)	F. Bagheri 9'; H. Tariq 24'; A. Sayyadmanesh 74'; M. Zakipour (yellow card) 80'; M. Neumayr (yellow card) 86'	Report	H. Saki (yellow card) 69'; A. Imani (yellow card) 76'; S. Ghorbani (yellow card) 85'	Stadium: Azadi Stadium; Attendance: 12,000; Man of the Match: Farshid Esmaeili

7 December 2018 15	Sepidrood	0 – 5	Esteghlal	Rasht
15:00 IRST (UTC+03:30)	M. Nozhati (yellow card) 26'; A. Ezzati (yellow card) 55'	Report	F. Bagheri 12', 34'; J. Ansari 57'; Tohidast 58' (o.g.); R. Azari 75'	Stadium: Sardar Jangal Stadium; Attendance: 15,000; Man of the Match: Farshid Bagheri

7 February 2019 16	Paykan	0 – 4	Esteghlal	Shahr-e Qods
15:45 IRST (UTC+03:30)	M. Batista (yellow card) 6'; F. Emamali (yellow card) 57'	Report	M. Tabrizi 16'; O. Noorafkan (yellow card) 20'; M. Zakipour 58'; M. Daneshgar (yellow card) 81'; Isma 83'; F. Bagheri (yellow card) 90+1'; V. Ghafouri 90+2'	Stadium: Shahr-e Qods Stadium; Attendance: 10,000

24 February 2019 17	Esteghlal	3 – 0	Zob Ahan	Tehran
18:30 IRST (UTC+03:30)	F. Esmaeili 7'} R. Cheshmi (yellow card) 38'; A. Patosi 40'; M. Daneshgar 51'	Report	H. Mohammadi (yellow card) 38'	Stadium: Azadi Stadium; Attendance: 22,000; Referee: Alireza Faghani; Man of the Match: A. Patosi

15 February 2019 18	Tractor Sazi	1 – 0	Esteghlal	Tabriz
15:36 IRST (UTC+03:30)	A. Dejagah (yellow card) 45' (goal) 53'; A. Imani (yellow card) 58'	Report	D. Shojaeian (yellow card) 32'; R. Cheshmi (yellow card) 90'	Stadium: Yadegar-e Emam Stadium; Attendance: 80,000; Referee: Ashkan Khorshidi

20 February 2019 19	Esteghlal	2 – 0	Pars Jonoubi Jam	Tehran
18:30 IRST (UTC+03:30)	E. Mirjavan 11' (o.g.); R. Cheshmi (yellow card) 23'; A. Patosi 38'; P. Montazeri (yellow card) 64'; V. Ghafouri (yellow card) 84'; Isma (yellow card) 92'	Report		Stadium: Azadi Stadium; Attendance: 16,000; Referee: Hassan Ekrami; Man of the Match: Ayanda Patosi

28 February 2019 20	Foolad	1 – 3	Esteghlal	Ahvaz
15:00 IRST (UTC+03:30)	H. Beyt Saeed 38'; R. Mirzaei (yellow card) 34'; R. Messi (yellow card) 64'	Report	G. Mensha 15'; M. Daneshgar (yellow card) 19'; A. Patosi 40'; M. Karimi (yellow card) 90+2'; Isma 90+4'	Stadium: Ghadir Stadium; Attendance: 30,000; Referee: Seyed Mehdi Seyed Ali; Man of the Match: Godwin Mensha

8 March 2019 21	Esteghlal	1 – 0	Naft Masjed Soleyman	Tehran
18:30 IRST (UTC+03:30)	A. Karimi 9'; O. Noorafkan (yellow card) 41'; H. Hosseini (yellow card) 79'	Report	H. Nassari (yellow card) 40'; Y. Vakia (yellow card) 74'	Stadium: Azadi Stadium; Attendance: 14,000; Referee: Ali Safaei

16 March 2019 22	Esteghlal	1 – 0	Nassaji Mazandaran	Tehran
19:00 IRST (UTC+03:30)	M. Tabrizi 42' (pen.); D. Shojaeian (yellow card) 68'; G. Mensha (yellow card) 90+2'	Report	F. Faraji (yellow card) 38'; M. Abdi (yellow card) 41'; M. Abshak (yellow card) 67'	Stadium: Azadi Stadium; Attendance: 17,000; Referee: Mohammadreza Akbarian

30 March 2019 23	Persepolis	1 – 0	Esteghlal	Tehran
16:01 IRDT (UTC+04:30)	A. Nourollahi 21'; S. Khalilzadeh (yellow card) 44'; A. Beiranvand (yellow card) 45+2'; M. Torabi (yellow card) 57'; J. Hosseini (yellow card) 57'	Report	M. Zakipour (yellow card) 44'; F. Esmaeili (penalty missed) 45+1'; A. Karimi (yellow card) 59'	Stadium: Azadi Stadium; Attendance: 80,000; Referee: Ashkan Khorshidi

3 April 2019 24	Esteghlal	0 – 0	Saipa	Tehran
17:46 IRDT (UTC+04:30)	A. Karimi (yellow card) 90'	Report	A. Dashti (yellow card) 57'	Stadium: Azadi Stadium; Attendance: 17,000; Referee: Alireza Faghani

12 April 2019 25	Sepahan	0 – 1	Esteghlal	Isfahan
17:47 IRDT (UTC+04:30)	K. Shafiei (yellow card) 57'	Report	A. Patosi 90+7'	Stadium: Naghsh-e Jahan Stadium; Attendance: 60,000; Man of the Match: Ayanda Patosi

17 April 2019 26	Esteghlal	1 – 0	Machine Sazi	Tehran
20:17 IRDT (UTC+04:30)	M. Ghayedi 76'; O. Noorafkan (yellow card) 49' (yellow-red card) 90+2'; R. Cheshmi (yellow card) 50'	Report	J. Quitongo (yellow card) 55'; F. Karimi (yellow card) 71'	Stadium: Azadi Stadium; Attendance: 20,000; Man of the Match: Mehdi Ghayedi

27 April 2019 27	Padideh	1 – 0	Esteghlal	Mashhad
20:16 IRDT (UTC+04:30)	Barzay 8'; M. Ghaseminejad (yellow card) 42'; A. Sadeghi (yellow card) 45'; A. Hosseini (yellow card) 67'; M. Farahani (yellow card) 89'	Report		Stadium: Imam Reza Stadium; Attendance: 33,000; Referee: Koupal Nazemi

1 May 2019 28	Esteghlal	4 – 2	Esteghlal Khuzestan	Tehran
20:15 IRDT (UTC+04:30)	D. Shojaeian (yellow card) 4'; Isma 26'; R. Karimi 68'; M. Tabrizi 86'; A. Karimi 90'	Report	V. Hamdinejad (yellow card) 26'; Farid Amiri 28'; R. Naami (yellow card) 37'; M. Sharifi (yellow card) 63'; R. Darvishi (yellow card) 75'; A. Kalantari 79'	Stadium: Azadi Stadium; Attendance: 9,500; Referee: Mouood Bonyadifar

11 May 2019 29	Sanat Naft	0 – 0	Esteghlal	Abadan
21:30 IRDT (UTC+04:30)	H. Saki (yellow card) 83'; M. Ghorishi (yellow card) 90'	Report	A. Sohrabian (yellow card) 30'; P. Montazeri (yellow card) 51'; R. Cheshmi (yellow card) 63'; M. Tabrizi (yellow card) 75'	Stadium: Takhti Abadan; Referee: Mohammad Reza Akbarian

16 May 2019 30	Esteghlal	2 – 1	Sepidrood	Tehran
21:30 IRDT (UTC+04:30)	M. Ghayedi 26'; M. Tabrizi 68'; A. Sohrabian (yellow card) 57'; R. Cheshmi (yellow card) 68'; D. Shojaeian (yellow card) 83'	Report	M. Bayrami (yellow card) 84' (goal) 92'	Stadium: Azadi Stadium; Attendance: 15,000; Referee: Alireza Faghani

=== Hazfi Cup ===
2 October 2018 Round of 32	Naft Masjed Soleyman	0 – 1 (a.e.t.)	Esteghlal	Masjed Soleyman
20:45 IRST (UTC+03:30)	H. Nassari (yellow card) 64'	Report	R. Bagheri 96'; M. Tabrizi (yellow card) 70'; M. Ghayedi (yellow card) 95'; V. Ghafouri (red card) 109'	Stadium: Behnam Mohammadi Stadium; Attendance: 15,000; Referee: Reza Kermanshahi

1 November 2018 Round of 16	Esteghlal	2 – 2 (a.e.t.) (1 – 3 p)	Saipa	Tehran
16:30 IRST (UTC+03:30)	F. Esmaeili 17' (pen.) (yellow card) 49'; A. Gero 34' (pen.); M. Daneshgar (yellow card) 54'; M. Zakipour (yellow card) 66'; R. Cheshmi (yellow card) 111'	Report	M. Torabi 28'; M. Hajmohammadi 42'; S. Sarfo (yellow card) 23' (yellow-red card) 33'; R. Asadi (yellow card) 80'	Stadium: Azadi Stadium; Attendance: 12,000; Referee: Bijan Heydari
	Penalties
	Sohrabian (penalty scored); Ghayedi (penalty missed); R. Bagheri (penalty missed); Esmaeili (penalty missed)		Rezavand (penalty scored); Ramezani (penalty scored); Asadi (penalty scored); Torabi (penalty missed)

=== Super Cup ===
20 July 2018 Final	Persepolis	3 – 0	Esteghlal	Tehran
(DST+04:30)		Report		Stadium: Azadi Stadium
Note: The match was not played, because Esteghlal refused to do it. Football Federation declared the match 3–0 in favor of Persepolis.

=== AFC Champions League ===
==== 2018 AFC Champions League ====
===== Quarter-finals =====
27 August 2018 First leg	Esteghlal (Iran)	1 – 3	(Qatar) Al-Sadd	Tehran, Iran
20:30 UTC+4:30	M. Barsham 12' (o.g.); M. Neumayr (yellow card) 42'; A. Sohrabian (yellow card) 47'; F. Bagheri (yellow card) 64'	Live Report; Stats Report	A. Afif 61'; B. Bounedjah 65' 74' (pen.); J. Woo-young (yellow card) 24'	Stadium: Azadi Stadium; Attendance: 78,116; Referee: (China) Ma Ning; Man of the Match: Baghdad Bounedjah

17 September 2018 Second leg	Al-Sadd (Qatar)	2 – 2 (5 – 3 agg.)	(Iran) Esteghlal	Doha, Qatar
19:00 UTC+3	A. Afif 27'; B. Bounedjah 90+1' (pen.); Y. Abubakar (yellow card) 81'	Live Report; Stats Report	R. Bagheri 33'; M. Tabrizi 49'; R. Cheshmi (yellow card) 22' (yellow-red card) 51'; F. Esmaeili (yellow card) 86'; M. Rahmati (yellow card) 90+1'	Stadium: Jassim bin Hamad Stadium; Attendance: 6,462; Referee: (Singapore) Muhammad Taqi; Man of the Match: Akram Afif

==== 2019 AFC Champions League ====
===== Group stage =====
Pos	Team	Pld	W	D	L	GF	GA	GD	Pts	Qualification	HIL	DUH	EST	AIN
1	(Saudi Arabia) Al-Hilal	6	4	1	1	10	5	+5	13	Advance to knockout stage	—	3–1	1–0	2–0
2	(Qatar) Al-Duhail	6	2	3	1	11	8	+3	9	Advance to knockout stage	2–2	—	3–0	2–2
3	(Iran) Esteghlal	6	2	2	2	6	8	−2	8		2–1	1–1	—	1–1
4	(United Arab Emirates) Al-Ain	6	0	2	4	4	10	−6	2		0–1	0–2	1–2	—

Source: AFC
Rules for classification: Group stage tiebreakers

===== Matches =====
5 March 2019 1	Al-Duhail (Qatar)	3 – 0	(Iran) Esteghlal	Doha, Qatar
18:15 UTC+3	M. Benatia 56'; Y. El-Arabi 73'; A. Afifi 90+1'; A. Yasser (yellow card) 32'	Live Report; Stats Report	O. Noorafkan (yellow card) 27'; V. Ghafouri (yellow card) 65'	Stadium: Abdullah bin Khalifa Stadium; Attendance: 6,888; Referee: Ravshan Irmatov (Uzbekistan); Man of the Match: Shoya Nakajima

12 March 2019 2	Esteghlal (Iran)	1 – 1	(United Arab Emirates) Al-Ain	Tehran, Iran
19:00 UTC+3:30	F. Bagheri 53' (yellow card) 19'; F. Esmaeili (yellow card) 82'	Live Report; Stats Report	T. Shiotani 85'; A. Abdulrahman (yellow card) 90+1'	Stadium: Azadi Stadium; Attendance: 65,178; Referee: Ahmed Al-Kaf (Oman); Man of the Match: Farshid Bagheri

8 April 2019 3	Esteghlal (Iran)	2 – 1	(Saudi Arabia) Al-Hilal	Doha, Qatar
20:00 UTC+3	A. Karimi 5' (yellow card) 19'; P. Montazeri 30'; M. Daneshgar (yellow card) 51'; F. Esmaeili (yellow card) 56'; M. Zakipour (yellow card) 90+5'	Live Report; Stats Report	A. Al-Bulaihi (yellow card) 32'; B. Gomis 71'	Stadium: Hamad bin Khalifa Stadium; Attendance: 947; Referee: Chris Beath (Australia)

23 April 2019 4	Al-Hilal (Saudi Arabia)	1 – 0	(Iran) Esteghlal	Abu Dhabi, United Arab Emirates
19:00 UTC+4	N. Al Abed (yellow card) 25' (yellow-red card) 52'; M. Al-Breik (yellow card) 48'; S. Giovinco 51'; Y. Al-Shahrani (yellow card) 74'	Live Report; Stats Report	G. Mensha (yellow card) 15'; M. Daneshgar (yellow card) 30'; D. Shojaeian (yellow card) 45'; R. Cheshmi (yellow card) 60'	Stadium: Mohammed Bin Zayed Stadium; Attendance: 2,212; Referee: Ryuji Sato (Japan)

6 May 2019 5	Esteghlal (Iran)	1 – 1	(Qatar) Al-Duhail	Tehran, Iran
20:30 UTC+4:30	D. Shojaeian (yellow card) 7'; R. Cheshmi 53'; A. Sohrabian (yellow card) 65'	Live Report; Stats Report	Edmilson 55'	Stadium: Azadi Stadium; Attendance: 37,400; Referee: Adham Makhadmeh (Jordan)

20 May 2019 6	Al-Ain (United Arab Emirates)	1 – 2	(Iran) Esteghlal	Al Ain, UAE
22:00 UTC+4	M. Berg 13' (yellow card) 38'; Caio (yellow card) 34'; S. Jumaa (yellow card) 90+3'	Live Report; Stats Report	M. Daneshgar 22' (yellow card) 78'; M. Tabrizi 45+1'; R. Cheshmi (yellow card) 50'	Stadium: Hazza bin Zayed Stadium; Attendance: 1,126; Referee: Ko Hyung-jin (South Korea); Man of the Match: Morteza Tabrizi

== Statistics ==
=== Squad statistics ===
No.	Pos	Nat	Player	Total		Pro League		Hazfi Cup		Super Cup		2018 ACL		2019 ACL	
No.	Pos	Nat	Player	Apps	Goals	Apps	Goals	Apps	Goals	Apps	Goals	Apps	Goals	Apps	Goals
1	GK	(Iran)	Mehdi Rahmati	22	0	17	0	1	0	0	0	2	0	2	0
2	DF	(Iran)	Khosro Heydari	12	0	8	0	0	0	0	0	1	0	3	0
3	DF	(Iran)	Milad Zakipour	28	1	21	1	2	0	0	0	1	0	4	0
4	DF	(Iran)	Roozbeh Cheshmi	27	1	19	0	2	0	0	0	2	0	4	1
5	MF	(South Africa)	Ayanda Patosi	19	4	13	4	0	0	0	0	0	0	6	0
6	MF	(Iran)	Ali Karimi	33	3	26	2	1	0	0	0	1	0	5	1
7	MF	(Germany)	Markus Neumayr ^{†}	10	0	8	0	1	0	0	0	1	0	0	0
8	MF	(Iran)	Farshid Esmaeili	28	3	21	2	2	1	0	0	2	0	3	0
9	FW	(Nigeria)	Alhaji Gero ^{†}	10	1	7	0	2	1	0	0	0	0	1	0
10	FW	(Iran)	Rouhollah Bagheri	18	3	14	1	2	1	0	0	1	1	1	0
11	FW	(Iran)	Morteza Tabrizi	29	7	24	5	1	0	0	0	2	1	2	1
12	DF	(Iran)	Meysam Teymouri	3	0	3	0	0	0	0	0	0	0	0	0
13	DF	(Iran)	Armin Sohrabian	25	0	18	0	2	0	0	0	2	0	3	0
14	MF	(Iran)	Farshid Bagheri	28	4	22	3	2	0	0	0	1	0	3	1
16	FW	(Iran)	Allahyar Sayyad	18	2	15	2	2	0	0	0	1	0	0	0
17	MF	(Iraq)	Humam Tariq	18	1	14	1	1	0	0	0	2	0	1	0
20	FW	(Guinea-Bissau)	Esmaël Gonçalves	18	3	13	3	0	0	0	0	0	0	5	0
21	DF	(Iran)	Vouria Ghafouri	31	4	23	4	1	0	0	0	2	0	5	0
22	GK	(Iran)	Hossein Hosseini	18	0	13	0	1	0	0	0	0	0	4	0
23	MF	(Iran)	Dariush Shojaeian	19	0	15	0	0	0	0	0	0	0	4	0
24	FW	(Iran)	Jaber Ansari ^{†}	4	1	2	1	1	0	0	0	1	0	0	0
25	MF	(Iran)	Mehdi Ghayedi	15	3	9	3	2	0	0	0	1	0	3	0
28	MF	(Iran)	Mohsen Karimi	6	0	4	0	0	0	0	0	0	0	2	0
30	MF	(Iran)	Omid Noorafkan	14	0	9	0	0	0	0	0	0	0	5	0
33	DF	(Iran)	Pejman Montazeri	34	1	25	0	1	0	0	0	2	0	6	1
44	DF	(Iran)	Farshad Mohammadi Mehr	10	0	9	0	1	0	0	0	0	0	0	0
70	DF	(Iran)	Mohammad Daneshgar	29	3	22	2	1	0	0	0	1	0	5	1
77	MF	(Iran)	Reza Azari	6	1	5	1	1	0	0	0	0	0	0	0
88	MF	(Iran)	Reza Karimi	3	1	2	1	0	0	0	0	0	0	1	0
90	FW	(Nigeria)	Godwin Mensha	18	1	13	1	0	0	0	0	0	0	5	0
99	FW	(Iran)	Sajjad Aghaei	4	0	3	0	0	0	0	0	1	0	0	0

Last updated: 4 June 2019
Source: Competitions

- ^{†} Players who left the club mid-season.

=== Goalscorers ===
Rank	Player	Position	Pro League	Hazfi Cup	ACL^{1}	Total
1	(Iran) Morteza Tabrizi	FW	5	0	2	7
2	(Iran) Vouria Ghafouri	DF	4	0	0	4
2	(South Africa) Ayanda Patosi	MF	4	0	0	4
2	(Iran) Farshid Bagheri	MF	3	0	1	4
3	(Iran) Mehdi Ghayedi	MF	3	0	0	3
3	(Guinea-Bissau) Esmaël Gonçalves	FW	3	0	0	3
3	(Iran) Ali Karimi	MF	2	0	1	3
3	(Iran) Mohammad Daneshgar	DF	2	0	1	3
3	(Iran) Farshid Esmaeili	MF	2	1	0	3
3	(Iran) Rouhollah Bagheri	FW	1	1	1	3
4	(Iran) Allahyar Sayyad	FW	2	0	0	2
5	(Iran) Milad Zakipour	DF	1	0	0	1
5	(Iraq) Humam Tariq	MF	1	0	0	1
5	(Iran) Reza Azari	MF	1	0	0	1
5	(Iran) Reza Karimi	MF	1	0	0	1
5	(Nigeria) Godwin Mensha	FW	1	0	0	1
5	(Iran) Jaber Ansari	MF	1	0	0	1
5	(Iran) Roozbeh Cheshmi	DF	0	0	1	1
5	(Iran) Pejman Montazeri	DF	0	0	1	1
5	(Nigeria) Alhaji Gero	FW	0	1	0	1
Own goals			3	0	1	4
Total			40	3	9	52

^{1} Includes 2018 AFC Champions League, 2019 AFC Champions League.

=== Clean sheets ===
Rank	Name	Pro League	Hazfi Cup	ACL^{1}	Total
1	(Iran) Mehdi Rahmati	12	1	0	13
2	(Iran) Hossein Hosseini	7	0	0	7
Total		19	1	0	20

^{1} Includes 2018 AFC Champions League, 2019 AFC Champions League.

=== Disciplinary record ===
==== Bookings & sending-off ====
N	P	Nat.	Name	Pro League			Hazfi Cup			2018 ACL			2019 ACL			Total			Notes
N	P	Nat.	Name	Yellow card	Second yellow card	Red card	Yellow card	Second yellow card	Red card	Yellow card	Second yellow card	Red card	Yellow card	Second yellow card	Red card	Yellow card	Second yellow card	Red card	Notes
1	GK	(Iran)	Mehdi Rahmati							1						1			
3	DF	(Iran)	Milad Zakipour	3	1		1						1			5	1		
4	DF	(Iran)	Roozbeh Cheshmi	7			1				1		2			10	1		
6	MF	(Iran)	Ali Karimi	3									1			4			
7	MF	(Germany)	Markus Neumayr	1						1						2			
8	MF	(Iran)	Farshid Esmaeili	2			1			1			2			6			
10	FW	(Iran)	Rouhollah Bagheri	2												2			
11	FW	(Iran)	Morteza Tabrizi	1			1									2			
13	DF	(Iran)	Armin Sohrabian	4			1			1			1			7			
14	MF	(Iran)	Farshid Bagheri	4						1			1			6			
16	FW	(Iran)	Allahyar Sayyadmanesh	3	1											3	1		
20	FW	(Guinea-Bissau)	Esmaël Gonçalves	2												2			
21	DF	(Iran)	Vouria Ghafouri	1					1				1			2		1	
22	GK	(Iran)	Hossein Hosseini	2												2			
23	MF	(Iran)	Dariush Shojaeian	4									2			6			
25	MF	(Iran)	Mehdi Ghayedi				1									1			
28	MF	(Iran)	Mohsen Karimi	1												1			
30	MF	(Iran)	Omid Noorafkan	3	1								1			4	1		
33	DF	(Iran)	Pejman Montazeri	3						1						4			
44	DF	(Iran)	Farshad Mohammadi	3												3			
70	DF	(Iran)	Mohammad Daneshgar	7	1		1						3			11	1		
90	FW	(Nigeria)	Godwin Mensha	1									1			2			
99	FW	(Iran)	Sajjad Aghaei	1												1			

Last updated: 5 June 2019
Source: Scoreway
Ordered by (red card) , (second yellow card) and (yellow card)
(yellow card) = Number of bookings; (second yellow card) = Number of sending offs after a second yellow card; (red card) = Number of sending offs by a direct red card.

==== Suspensions ====
No.	Pos	Nat	Player	No. of matches served	Reason	Competition	Date served	Opponent(s)	Ref.
70	DF	(Iran)	Mohammad Daneshgar	1	Double yellow card in a match against Zob Ahan	League	10 August 2018	Tractor Sazi	
16	FW	(Iran)	Allahyar Sayyad	2	Immoral celebration	League	16 August 2018	Pars Jonoubi Jam	
16	FW	(Iran)	Allahyar Sayyad	2	Immoral celebration	League	22 August 2018	Foolad	
99	FW	(Iran)	Sajjad Aghaei	2	Immoral celebration	League	16 August 2018	Pars Jonoubi Jam	
99	FW	(Iran)	Sajjad Aghaei	2	Immoral celebration	League	22 August 2018	Foolad	
