= Winfried Schäfer =

German footballer and manager (born 1950)

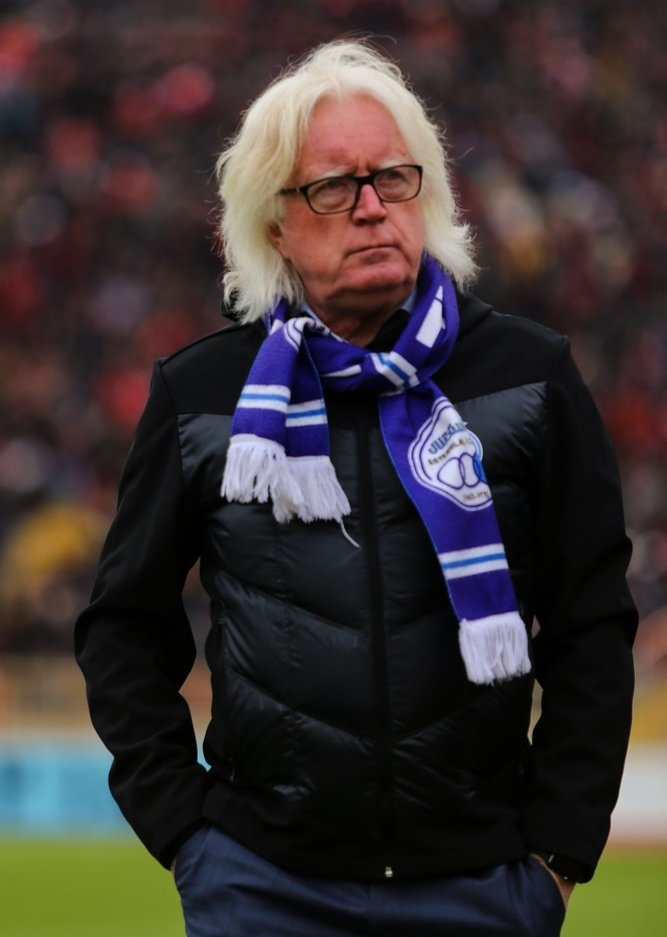
- Schäfer as Esteghlal manager in 2019

Personal information
- Date of birth: 10 January 1950 (age 76)
- Place of birth: Mayen, West Germany
- Height: 1.75 m (5 ft 9 in)
- Position: Midfielder

Senior career*
Years	Team	Apps	(Gls)
1968–1970	Borussia Mönchengladbach	43	(4)
1970–1975	Kickers Offenbach	160	(37)
1975–1977	Karlsruher SC	68	(10)
1977–1985	Borussia Mönchengladbach	167	(11)
Total		438	(62)

Managerial career
- 1982–1985: Borussia Mönchengladbach II
- 1986–1998: Karlsruher SC
- 1998: VfB Stuttgart
- 1999–2001: Borussia Berlin
- 2001–2004: Cameroon
- 2005–2007: Al-Ahli
- 2007–2009: Al-Ain
- 2010–2011: Baku
- 2011–2013: Thailand
- 2013: Muangthong United (interim)
- 2013–2016: Jamaica
- 2017–2019: Esteghlal
- 2019–2020: Baniyas
- 2021: Al-Khor
Medal record
Men's football
Representing Cameroon (as manager)
Africa Cup of Nations
Winner	2002
FIFA Confederations Cup
Runner-up	2003
Representing Thailand (as manager)
AFF Championship
Runner-up	2012
- * Club domestic league appearances and goals

Winfried Schäfer (born 10 January 1950) is a German professional football manager and former player.

== Playing career ==
A midfielder, Schäfer played 403 Bundesliga matches and scored 46 goals in the West German top-flight.

He won the 1969–70 Bundesliga title and 1969–70 DFB-Pokal with two different clubs – because the cup final was played after the 1970 FIFA World Cup and his move from Borussia Mönchengladbach to Kickers Offenbach.

== Coaching career ==
=== Karlsruher SC ===
As a manager, he led Karlsruher SC to the semi-finals of the UEFA Cup in the 1993–94 season.

=== Cameroon national team ===
In November 2001, Schäfer was appointed head coach of Cameroon. He won the 2002 African Cup of Nations with Cameroon, defeating Senegal 3–2 in a penalty shoot-out after a 0–0 draw in the final. Under Schäfer, Cameroon also reached the final of the 2003 FIFA Confederations Cup, where they were defeated 1–0 by hosts France, although the result was overshadowed by the death of Cameroon midfielder Marc-Vivien Foé in the 1–0 semi-final victory over Colombia, who had collapsed on the pitch.

=== Al-Ahli ===
In 2006, he won the UAE national championship with Al-Ahli. He worked then from 2007 to 2009 for UAE League side Al-Ain.

=== FK Baku ===
On 10 June 2010, Schäfer signed a two-year contract with Azerbaijani club Baku. On 18 January 2011, his contract was ended.

=== Thailand national team and Muangthong United ===
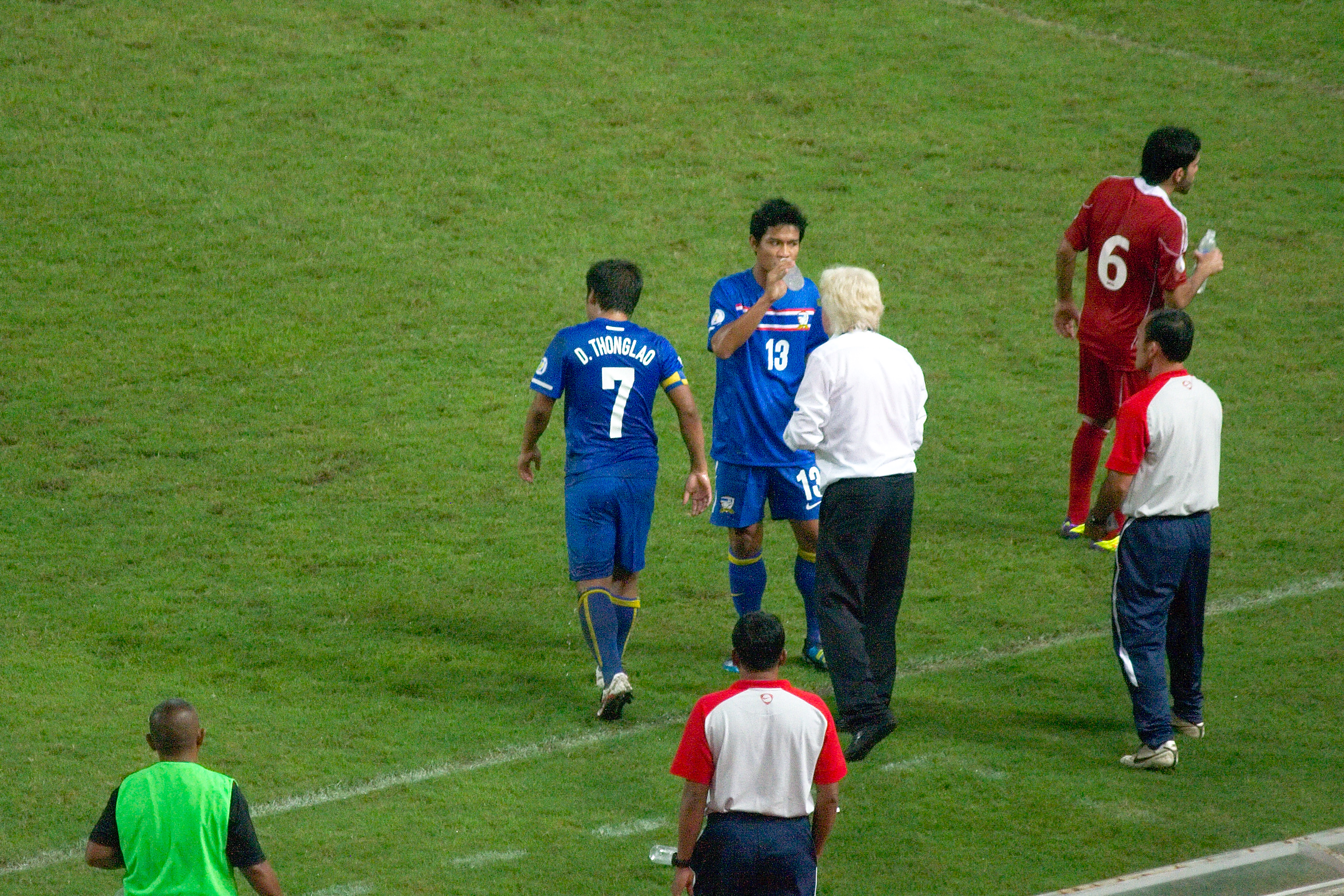
Schäfer while coaching Thailand against Oman in 2011

In late June 2011, Schäfer was hired as Thailand manager on a three-year contract. On 4 June 2013, Schäfer and Football Association of Thailand mutually agreed to cancel the contract. The following day, he became manager of thai club Muangthong United, replacing Serbian Slaviša Jokanović.

=== Jamaica national team ===
On 17 July 2013, it was announced that Schäfer will become the new coach of Jamaica, replacing previous manager Theodore Whitmore who resigned from his position following a 2–0 loss to Honduras. Jamaica's first match with Schäfer as manager was a World Cup qualification match against Panama on 7 September 2013 which ended with a 0–0 draw.

In the 2014 Caribbean Cup, Jamaica's first match ended with a 1–1 draw over Martinique. However, the team recorded two-straight wins against Antigua and Barbuda and Haiti to make it to the final. Schäfer led Jamaica to their sixth Caribbean Cup title after beating Trinidad and Tobago 4–3 on penalties in the final.

In June 2015, at the Copa América, Jamaica put in an incredible performance, being drawn in the same group as regional powers Argentina and Uruguay, who both defeated Jamaica by a single goal. Shortly after, on 22 July 2015 Schäfer's team reached the Final of the Gold Cup after beating tournament favourites the United States.

=== Esteghlal ===
On 2 October 2017, Schäfer was chosen to become the new manager of Iranian club Esteghlal, following Alireza Mansourian's resignation as team's head coach. The next day, he signed his official contract with Esteghlal until the end of the season.

==== 2017–18 season ====
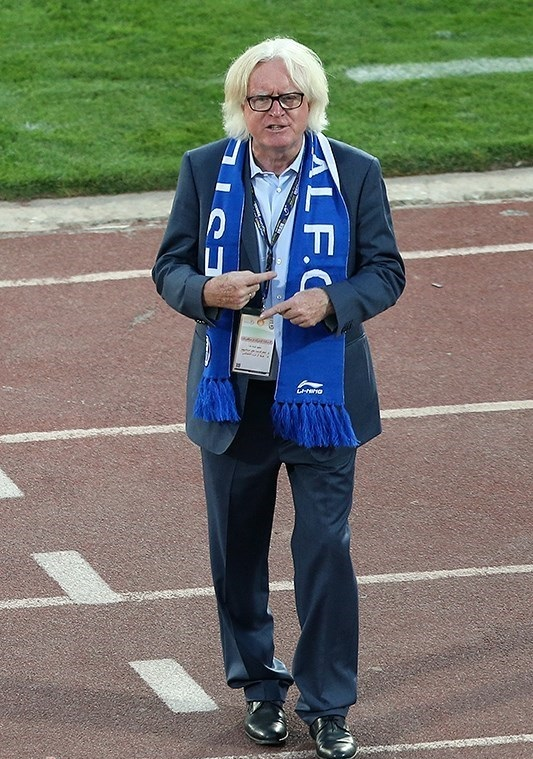
Schäfer with Esteghlal in 2017

Upon being appointed, Schäfer re-called Esteghlal's captain Mehdi Rahmati who was banned from joining the team by the previous coach, Alireza Mansourian, as well as asking the management to re-sign Behnam Barzay whose contract wasn't renewed and became a free agent in summer. Schäfer also chose to continue working with Mick McDermott (whom he worked with as fitness coach in Al Ain) as Esteghlal's assistant manager, however they had a conflict later on and McDermott left the club on 30 October. Jiří Saňák and Miguel Coley were announced to replace him as Schäfer's assistant coach.

His first official match as Esteghlal's coach was the 0–0 against Foolad in Azadi Stadium on 13 October. His first victory came against Nassaji Mazandaran in Hazfi Cup, which Esteghlal won the match 2–1. He won his first league match on 31 October beating Naft Talaieh 2–0.

During the winter transfer window, he offloaded players which were not part of his plans for the rest of the season. Hassan Beyt Saeed joined Foolad while Yaghoub Karimi went to Esteghlal Khuzestan. Sajjad Shahbazzadeh joined Qatar SC on a free transfer. In association with Esteghlal vice president Seyed Pendar Toufighi, two new signings were made by Schäfer; free agent's Bojan Najdenov and Mame Thiam arrived at the club.

On 28 December, Schäfer's Esteghlal beat Esteghlal Khuzestan 3–0 and became the first team to reach a total of 900 points in all-time Persian Gulf Pro League table. In the 2018 AFC Champions League, Schäfer's team were drawn against Al-Rayyan, Al Ain and Al-Hilal in the competition's group of death. However, they did not lose a game, topping the group with some impressive performances. On 1 March 2018, Schäfer won his first Tehran derby as a manager in a 1–0 victory; this was also his third win against Branko Ivanković, having previously beaten him twice in 2. Bundesliga with Tennis Borussia Berlin when Branko was the manager of Hannover 96 during the 1999–2000 season. On 3 May 2018, Schäfer extended his contract until June 2020. On the same day, Schäfer won his first trophy with Esteghlal, the Hazfi Cup, when his side defeated Khooneh be Khooneh 1–0, with Mame Thiam scoring the only goal. Esteghlal extended their record of seven Hazfi Cups.

==== 2018–19 season ====
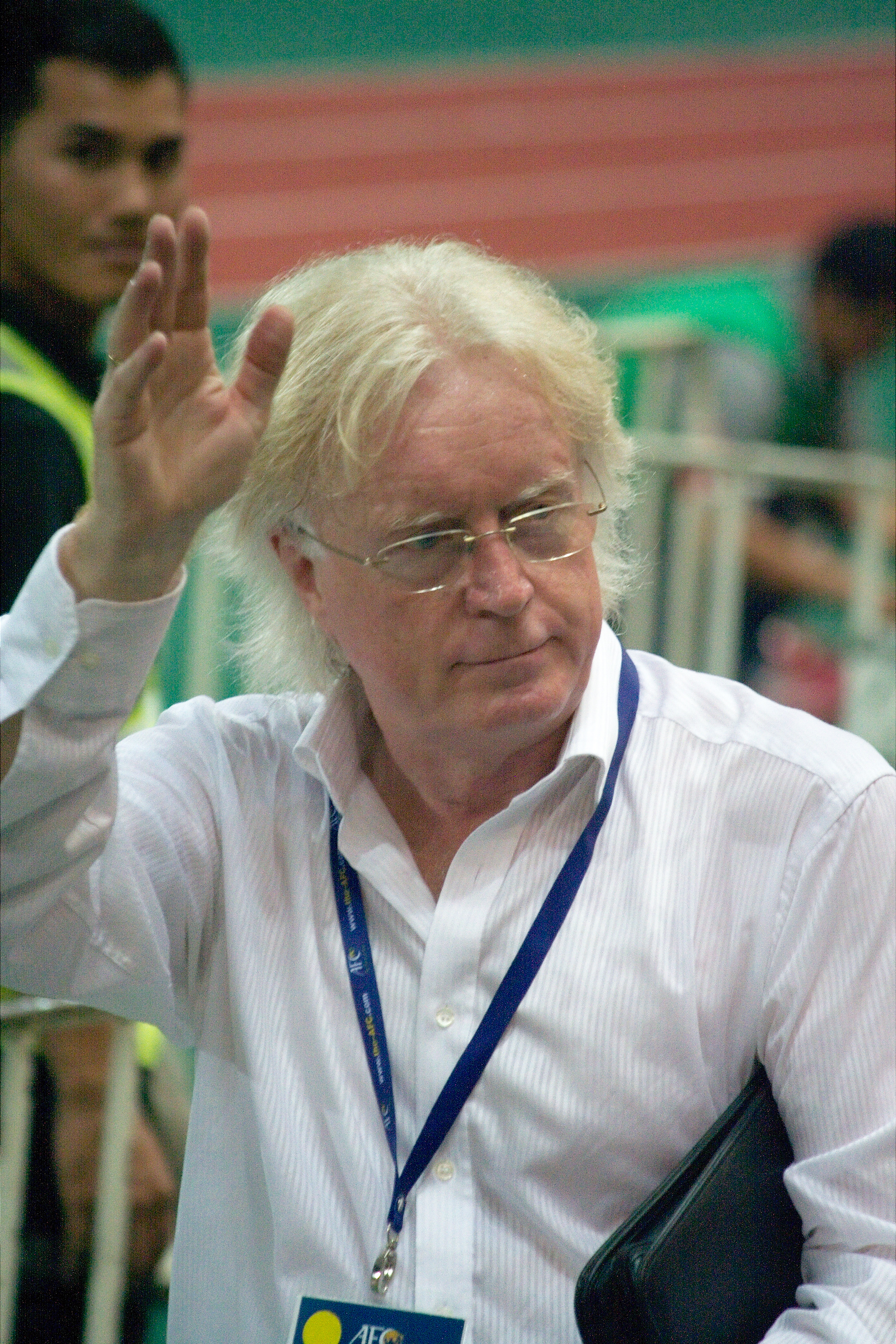
Schäfer after the World Cup 2014 third round qualifying match

During Schäfer's second season as manager, he saw some of his top players leaving the club, Majid Hosseini moved to Trabzonspor, while Omid Ebrahimi joined Al Ahli, Server Djeparov signed for Zhetysu and Omid Noorafkan moved to Charleroi. Esteghlal signed players such as Morteza Aghakhan, Rouhollah Bagheri, Farshad Mohammadi Mehr, Meysam Teymouri, Ali Karimi and Morteza Tabrizi to replace the departed players and improve the squad depth. He also asked to sign Nigerian striker Alhaji Gero, his compatriot Markus Neumayr as well as Iraq international Humam Tariq.

Schäfer's Esteghlal were eliminated in the quarter-finals of the AFC Champions League after a 5–3 aggregate loss to Al Sadd on 17 September 2018. They were also eliminated from the Hazfi Cup on 1 November, reaching the Round of 16 stage, after a penalty shootout defeat to Saipa after a 2–2 draw. On 29 April 2019, Schäfer was suspended until the end of the season two days after Esteghlal's loss to Padideh in the league and replaced by his assistant Farhad Majidi.

=== Baniyas ===
On 6 July 2019, Schäfer was confirmed as the new manager of Emirati side Baniyas, he coached the team until his contract expired with barely any notable records other than getting to the UAE President's Cup semi finals.

=== Al-Khor ===
In late January 2021, Schäfer became the head coach of Qatar Stars League club Al-Khor to help them in a difficult situation. Results and performance improved relatively, the team remained in the league after win 3–1 in the play-off match against Al-Shahania. On 11 November 2021, he left Qatar after his contract was terminated.

== Managerial statistics ==
As of match played 4 November 2021

Team	From	To	Record				
Team	From	To	G	W	D	L	Win %
Karlsruher SC	1 July 1986	25 March 1998	519	209	148	162	40.27
Stuttgart	1 July 1998	4 December 1998	26	10	6	10	38.46
TB Berlin	24 March 1999	30 June 2000	47	14	14	19	29.79
Cameroon	1 March 2002	2 November 2004	33	14	11	8	42.42
Al-Ahli	6 March 2005	17 February 2007	42	23	6	13	54.76
Al-Ain	27 December 2007	2 December 2009	65	39	16	10	60.00
FC Baku	1 July 2010	10 January 2011	23	10	6	7	43.48
Thailand	2 July 2011	4 June 2013	28	14	6	8	50.00
Muangthong United	7 June 2013	15 July 2013	6	5	0	1	83.33
Jamaica	17 July 2013	6 September 2016	41	14	7	20	34.15
Esteghlal	2 October 2017	29 April 2019	70	37	20	13	52.86
Baniyas	8 July 2019	1 June 2020	25	8	7	10	32.00
Al-Khor	28 January 2021	11 November 2021	23	3	10	10	13.04
Total			948	400	257	291	42.19

== Honours ==
=== Player ===
Borussia Mönchengladbach

- Bundesliga: 1969–70
- UEFA Cup: 1978–79

Kickers Offenbach

- DFB-Pokal: 1969–70

=== Manager ===
Karlsruhe

- 2. Bundesliga runner-up: 1986–87
- DFB-Pokal runner-up: 1995–96
- UEFA Intertoto Cup: 1996

Cameroon

- African Cup of Nations: 2002
- FIFA Confederations Cup: runner up, 2003

Al-Ahli

- UAE Football League: 2005–06

Al-Ain

- UAE President's Cup: 2008–09
- Etisalat Emirates Cup: 2008–09
- UAE Super Cup: 2009

Thailand

- AFF Championship runner-up: 2012

Jamaica

- Caribbean Cup: 2014
- CONCACAF Gold Cup runner-up: 2015

Esteghlal

- Hazfi Cup: 2017–18
- Iranian Super Cup runner-up: 2018

== Personal life ==
Schäfer is married, has two children and has lived with his family for more than 25 years in Ettlingen near Karlsruhe. In 2004, Schäfer was elected with the most votes to the municipal council of Ettlingen. He ran for the newly founded association "For Ettlingen". Because of his frequent work-related stays abroad, he held the mandate but barely. He is known for his passion for football. His son Sascha Oliver works with him as an assistant.
