= Seyed Pendar Toufighi =

- Born: 10 June 1972 (age 54); Gachsaran, Iran
- Education: University of Tehran
- Occupation: Football Administrator
- Website: seyedpendartoufighi.com

Seyed Pender Toufighi (Persian: پندار توفیقی, born 10 June 1972 in Gachsaran) is an Iranian professional football administrator, oil and gas industry activist, and former member of the board of directors of Esteghlal Football Club.

== Biography ==
He spent his primary education until the end of middle school in the day schools of Gachsaran city, and then in 1972, as an intern, he entered the technical and vocational school of the oil industry in Gachsaran and at the same time succeeded in obtaining a diploma in 1370 night high school classes. Entering Gachsaran University and graduating in the field of chemical engineering, majoring in refining industries by getting the third rank in the region of three countries and then passing the national master's degree and graduation exam in 1998 with the first rank from Mazandaran University of Science and Technology is part of his academic record. He graduated with a Ph.D. in Industrial management from the University of Tehran. In addition, his work experience in oil and gas and petrochemicals, the management of economic enterprises, and years of teaching technical and engineering courses and economics and management are part of his work record.

== Esteghlal Football Club of Iran ==
In Esteghlal Club, he has held various positions such as member and secretary of the board of directors, sports deputy and vice-president of the club, chairman of the economic and market development committee, and transferring players. During his tenure at Esteghlal Club, he was responsible for the transfer of Barikani such as Kaveh Rezaei, Server Djeparov, Mameh Baba Tiam, Mehdi Ghayedi, Alhayar Sayadmanesh, Mohammad Daneshgar, Farshid Bagheri, Farshid Ismaili, Dariush Shojaeian, Amir Hossein Esmailzadeh, Roozbeh Cheshmi, Voria Ghafouri, and several young and promising players became members of Esteghlal Club in Tehran.

Toufighi personally went to Isfahan during the closure of the transfer window of Esteghlal Club in the winter of 1995, lent Japarov's server to Sepahan and signed a loan deal. At the end of the 95-96 season, Sepahan claimed Djaparov intended to stay at Sepahan. And the media and legal dispute between the two clubs intensified, which eventually led to Toufighi representing Esteghlal Club by attending the Football Federation and providing documents on Djaparov's unconditional return to Esteghlal.

During the recruitment of Mame Baba Tiam in the transfer window of winter 1996 and the clash between Esteghlal Club and football brokers who prevented the presence of foreign players in Esteghlal, Toufighi confused football brokers by starting a media space and giving different names to the media. In the middle of the night of February 1396, at the same time as the player arrived in Iran, he met with Tiam and his agent at the CIP of Imam Khomeini Airport and concluded his contract.

During the transfer window, he was nicknamed "Pendar Time" by the fans due to his success in attracting players to Persepolis by Toufighi, who was in charge of player transfers, especially during the midfield, which was mainly after midnight. Players such as Server Djaparov, Mameh Baba Tiam, Mehdi Ghayedi, Alhayar Sayadmanesh, Mohammad Daneshgar, Farshid Bagheri, Dariush Shojaeian, Roozbeh Cheshmi, Amir Hossein Esmailzadeh, Farshad Mohammadi Mehr, Ruhollah Bagheri, Meysam Teymouri, Morteza Agha Khan, and Pezhman Montazeri, Sajjad Aghaei, Heidar Ali Ahmadzadeh, Sina Khadempour, Shahin Taherkhani, Reza Azari were attracted to Esteghlal by Toufighi in the middle of the night, nicknamed Pendar Time. Pendar Time is a word used by Esteghlal Tehran fans to Seyed Pendar Toufighi, in charge of transfers. They gave independence. This title was for the recruitment of players during the midnight hours and the golden times of transfers, which Toufighi Esteghlal mainly recruited during the transfer competition with Persepolis Club.

Toufighi has performed in the competition against Persepolis by attracting players such as Mehdi Ghayedi and Alhayar Sayadmanesh.
