= Patosi =

Patosi may refer to:

- Patos (municipality), in Albania (Albanian definite form: Patosi)
- Ayanda Patosi (born 1992), South African footballer
