= 1970 DFB-Pokal final =

- Match programme cover
- Event: 1969–70 DFB-Pokal
1. FC Köln	Kickers Offenbach
1	2
- Date: 29 August 1970
- Venue: Niedersachsenstadion, Hanover
- Referee: Gerhard Schulenburg (Hamburg)
- Attendance: 50,000

The 1970 DFB-Pokal final decided the winner of the 1969–70 DFB-Pokal, the 27th season of Germany's knockout football cup competition. It was played on 29 August 1970 at the Niedersachsenstadion in Hanover. Kickers Offenbach won the match 2–1 against 1. FC Köln, to claim their 1st cup title.

== Route to the final ==
The DFB-Pokal began with 32 teams in a single-elimination knockout cup competition. There were a total of four rounds leading up to the final. Teams were drawn against each other, and the winner after 90 minutes would advance. If still tied, 30 minutes of extra time was played. If the score was still level, a replay would take place at the original away team's stadium. If still level after 90 minutes, 30 minutes of extra time was played. If the score was still level, a drawing of lots would decide who would advance to the next round.

Note: In all results below, the score of the finalist is given first (H: home; A: away).

1. FC Köln		Round	Kickers Offenbach
Opponent	Result	1969–70 DFB-Pokal	Opponent	Result
Rot-Weiss Essen (A) (H)	3–3 (a.e.t.); 5–1 (replay)	Round 1	1860 Munich (H)	4–1
MSV Duisburg (H)	6–1	Round of 16	Borussia Dortmund (H)	2–1 (a.e.t.)
Borussia Mönchengladbach (A)	3–2 (a.e.t.)	Quarter-finals	Eintracht Frankfurt (A)	3–0
Alemannia Aachen (A)	4–0	Semi-finals	1. FC Nürnberg (H)	4–2 (a.e.t.)

== Match ==
=== Details ===
29 August 1970
16:00 CET

1. FC Köln	1–2	Kickers Offenbach
Löhr 73'	Report	Winkler 27'; Gecks 64'

Niedersachsenstadion, Hanover
Attendance: 50,000
Referee: Gerhard Schulenburg (Hamburg)

1. FC Köln	Kickers Offenbach

GK	1	(West Germany) Manfred Manglitz
SW		(West Germany) Werner Biskup
CB		(West Germany) Karl-Heinz Thielen	(substituted off) 31'
CB		(West Germany) Wolfgang Weber
CB		(West Germany) Matthias Hemmersbach
CM		(West Germany) Heinz Simmet
CM		(West Germany) Heinz Flohe
CM		(West Germany) Wolfgang Overath (c)
RW		(West Germany) Jupp Kapellmann
CF		(Austria) Thomas Parits
LW		(West Germany) Hannes Löhr
Substitutes:
FW		(West Germany) Bernd Rupp	(substituted on) 31'
Manager:
(Austria) Ernst Ocwirk

GK	1	(West Germany) Karlheinz Volz
SW		(West Germany) Hans Reich
CB		(West Germany) Josef Weilbächer
CB	6	(West Germany) Egon Schmitt (c)
CB		(West Germany) Helmut Kremers
RM		(West Germany) Helmut Schmidt
CM		(West Germany) Roland Weida
CM		(West Germany) Walter Bechtold	(substituted off) 60'
LM		(West Germany) Winfried Schäfer
CF		(West Germany) Horst Gecks
CF		(West Germany) Klaus Winkler
Substitutes:
DF		(West Germany) Helmut Nerlinger	(substituted on) 60'
Manager:
(West Germany) Kurt Schreiner (Note: Though Alfred Schmidt was manager of Kickers Offenbach at the time of the final, he was not on the bench following a car accident, and was instead represented by Kurt Schreiner.)

Match rules

- 90 minutes.
- 30 minutes of extra time if necessary.
- Replay if scores still level.
- Maximum of two substitutions.
