= Pourmohammad =

Pourmohammad is an Iranian surname, meaning 'son of Mohammad'. Notable people with the surname include:

- Amirhossein Pourmohammad (born 1998), Iranian footballer
- Mohammed Reza Pourmohammad (born 1987), Iranian footballer
