= Ayanda Patosi =

South African soccer player (born 1992)

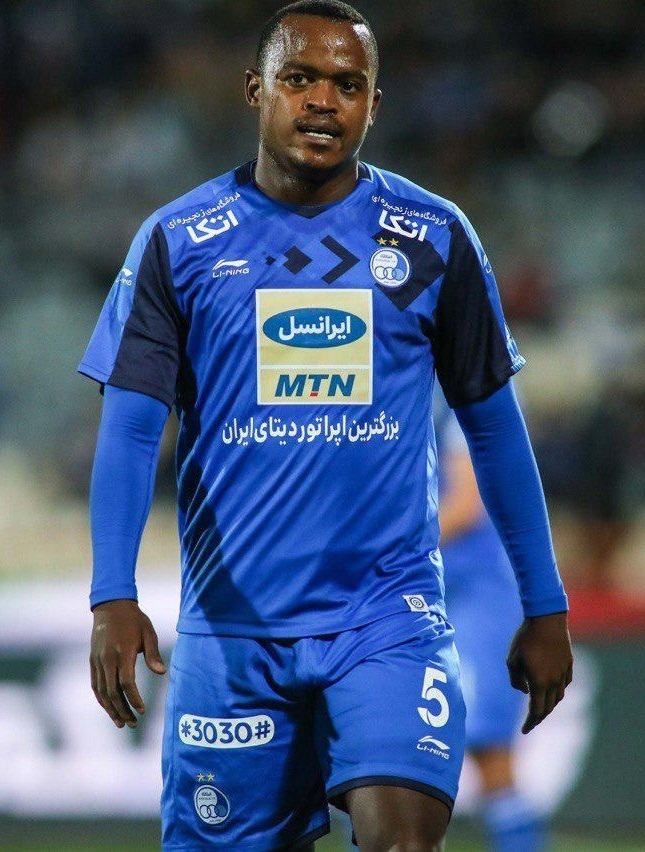
- Patosi playing for Esteghlal in March 2019.

Personal information
- Date of birth: 31 October 1992 (age 34)
- Place of birth: Cape Town, South Africa
- Height: 1.74 m (5 ft 9 in)
- Positions: Attacking midfielder; winger

Youth career
- 2010–2011: ASD Cape Town

Senior career*
Years	Team	Apps	(Gls)
2011–2017	Lokeren	145	(21)
2017–2020	Cape Town City	32	(8)
2019	→ Esteghlal (loan)	13	(4)
2019–2020	→ Baniyas (loan)	9	(1)
2020	→ Foolad (loan)	5	(2)
2020–2023	Foolad	60	(12)

International career
2013–2016	South Africa	12	(3)
- * Club domestic league appearances and goals as of 25 January 2023

Ayanda Patosi (born 31 October 1992) is a South African professional soccer player who plays as a left winger.

== Club career ==
=== Early career ===
At the age of 16, Patosi trained with Belgian club Genk. He spent the 2010–11 season with ASD Cape Town, and Patosi later returned to Belgium on a tour with the African Soccer Development school. While there, Patosi signed a four-year contract with Lokeren in May 2011.

He made his professional debut for Lokeren in the 2011–12 season, winning the Belgian Cup that same year.

=== Cape Town City ===
On 1 June 2017, Cape Town City announced via their official Twitter profile that they had signed Patosi from Lokeren on a free transfer. On 12 August, he made his debut for the club as a substitute in a MTN 8 cup match against Polokwane City, replacing Sibusiso Masina in a 0–1 win. Eleven days later, he made his first league start in a 3–1 win over Platinum Stars in which he scored his first goal for the club.

==== Loan to Esteghlal ====
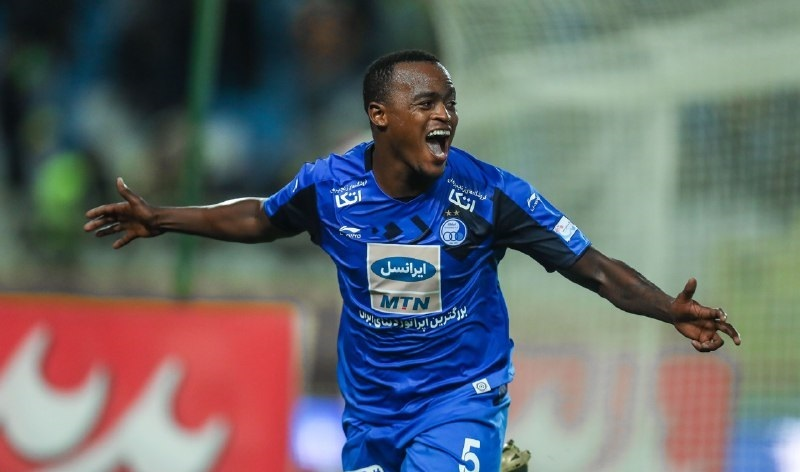
Patosi celebrating his goal for Esteghlal.

In January 2019, Patosi signed for Iranian side Esteghlal on loan for the remainder of the season, with the club retaining the option to purchase. He became the first South African player to join an Iranian team. He was assigned the number 5 shirt. His transfer was delayed as Football Federation Islamic Republic of Iran was waiting for South African Football Association to prove that Patosi had played international soccer in the last two years and he has decent international quality.

Patosi made his debut for the club on 20 February in a 2–0 win against Pars Jonoubi Jam, scoring the second goal. Esteghlal's first goal was also a deflected corner kick from Patosi by opponent Emad Mirjavan into their own net. On 1 June, Esteghlal decided not to opt their option to sign Patosi on permanent basis. Three days later, he announced on his Instagram his spell with the club has ended and he would not stay in the club for another season.

==== Loan to Baniyas ====
After returning to Cape Town, he was linked with a transfer away from the club.

On 14 July 2019, Patosi signed for Emarati side Baniyas on a season-long loan deal with the option to buy, reuniting with Winfried Schäfer, his former coach at Esteghlal. He made his debut in a 2–2 draw against Ajman Club in which he scored his team's equalizing goal.

=== Foolad ===
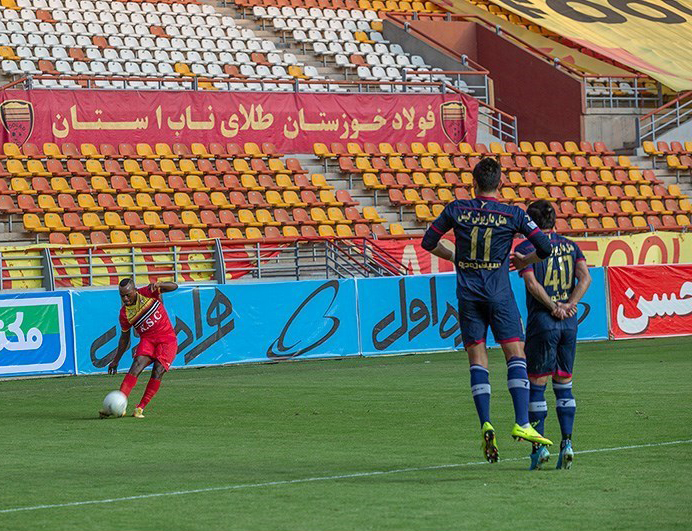
Patosi taking a freekick for Foolad in 2020.

On 9 January 2020, Patosi returned to Iran and signed a six-month loan deal with Foolad. On 2 February, he made his debut for the club in a 2–1 defeat against Sepahan. On 14 February, he scored his first goal for the club in a 2–1 victory against Paykan. Patosi was mostly left out of Foolad's squad by the manager Javad Nekounam due to weight issues following his return to soccer after the temporary suspension due to the coronavirus pandemic.

On 11 September 2020, Cape Town City and Foolad reached an agreement for the permanent transfer of Patosi to Foolad with the player agreeing to a two-year contract. He left Fooled in January 2023.

== International career ==
Patosi was tipped in March 2012 by fellow player Anele Ngcongca as a possible future star of the South African national team. In November 2012, Patosi was hailed as a "sensation" and there were calls for him to be included in the national team set-up. He received his first call-up to the national team in December 2012. Patosi made his international debut on 12 October 2013, in a friendly match against Morocco, alongside fellow players Sibusiso Vilakazi and Kgosi Nthle.

In December 2014 he was announced as being part of South Africa's provisional squad for the 2015 Africa Cup of Nations. He did not make the final, 23-man squad.

== Personal life ==
Patosi was born in Khayelitsha, Cape Town, South Africa. His father died when he was eleven and he was raised by his mother Nombulelo. In June 2014, he was a victim of a carjacking when he was in Gugulethu in Cape Town during the season break. The carjackers stole his car, however, Patosi was able to escape safely.

== Career statistics ==
=== Club ===
As of 25 January 2023.

Appearances and goals by club, season and competition
Club	Season	League (Note: Includes Belgian Pro League Europa League and Championship playoffs)			National Cup		League Cup		Continental		Other		Total	
Club	Season	Division	Apps	Goals	Apps	Goals	Apps	Goals	Apps	Goals	Apps	Goals	Apps	Goals
Lokeren	2011–12	Belgian Pro League	23	2	3	1	—		—		—		26	3
Lokeren	2012–13	Belgian Pro League	22	7	1	0	—		2 (Note: Appearances in UEFA Europa League)	0	1 (Note: Appearance in Belgian Super Cup)	0	26	7
Lokeren	2013–14	Belgian Pro League	31	2	6	0	—		—		—		37	2
Lokeren	2014–15	Belgian Pro League	28	3	4	0	—		3	1	0	0	35	3
Lokeren	2015–16	Belgian Pro League	33	7	2	0	—		—		—		35	2
Lokeren	2016–17	Belgian Pro League	8	0	1	0	—		—		—		9	0
Lokeren	Total		145	21	17	1	–		5	1	1	0	168	23
Cape Town City	2017–18	South African Premier Division	18	4	3	1	1	0	—		3 (Note: Appearance in MTN 8)	1	25	6
Cape Town City	2018–19	South African Premier Division	14	4	1	0	1	0	—		4	0	20	4
Cape Town City	Total		32	8	4	1	2	0	–		7	1	45	10
Esteghlal (loan)	2018–19	Persian Gulf Pro League	13	4	0	0	—		6 (Note: Appearances in AFC Champions League)	0	—		19	4
Baniyas (loan)	2019–20	UAE Pro League	9	1	5	1	—		—		—		14	2
Foolad (loan)	2019–20	Persian Gulf Pro League	5	2	0	0	—		—		—		5	2
Foolad	2020–21	Persian Gulf Pro League	27	5	4	1	—		7	1	—		38	7
Foolad	2021–22	Persian Gulf Pro League	23	6	2	1	—		4	1	—		29	8
Foolad	2022–23	Persian Gulf Pro League	10	1	0	0	—		—		—		10	1
Foolad	Total		60	12	6	2	—		11	2	—		77	16
Career total			264	48	32	5	2	0	22	3	8	1	328	57

=== International ===
As of 23 February 2019

Appearances and goals by national team and year
National team	Year	Apps	Goals
South Africa
South Africa	2013	2	0
South Africa	2014	3	1
South Africa	2015	5	1
South Africa	2016	2	1
Total		12	3

Scores and results list South Africa's goal tally first, score column indicates score after each Patosi goal.

List of international goals scored by Ayanda Patosi
No.	Date	Venue	Opponent	Score	Result	Competition
1	26 May 2014	Stadium Australia, Sydney, Australia	Australia	1–0	1–1	Friendly
2	16 June 2015	Cape Town Stadium, Cape Town, South Africa	Angola	2–1	2–1	Friendly
3	11 October 2016	Moses Mabhida Stadium, Durban, South Africa	Ghana	1–1	1–1	Friendly

== Honours ==
=== Club ===
Lokeren

- Belgian Cup: 2011–12, 2013–14

Cape Town City

- MTN 8: 2018

Foolad

- Hazfi Cup (1): 2020–21
- Iranian Super Cup: 2021
