= Faraz Emamali =

Iranian football forward

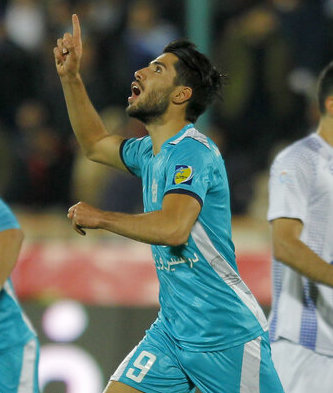

Personal information
- Full name: Faraz Emamali
- Date of birth: 21 January 1995 (age 31)
- Place of birth: Tehran, Iran
- Position: Forward

Team information
- Current team: Nassaji Mazandaran
- Number: 88

Youth career
- 2010–2016: Paykan

Senior career*
Years	Team	Apps	(Gls)
2014–2020	Paykan	112	(20)
2020–2023	Mes Rafsanjan	84	(9)
2023–2024	Shams Azar	28	(3)
2024–2025	Kheybar Khorramabad	28	(4)
2025–2026	Paykan	22	(1)
2026–	Nassaji Mazandaran	4	(0)

International career
2010–2012	Iran U17		
2012–2014	Iran U20	5	(2)
- * Club domestic league appearances and goals as of 23 November 2014

Faraz Emamali (Persian: فراز امام‌علی) is an Iranian football forward who currently plays for Iranian football club Nassaji Mazandaran in the Persian Gulf Pro League.

== Club career ==
=== Paykan ===
Emamali started his career with Paykan from youth levels. He was promoted to the first team after shining in the Tehran Asia Vision Super League with Paykan, where he scored 27 times with U19s and 14 times with U21s. He made his professional debut for Paykan on 21 November 2014 against Esteghlal Khuzestan as a substitute for Jahangir Asgari.

== Club career statistics ==
Club	Division	Season	League		Hazfi Cup		Asia		Total	
Club	Division	Season	Apps	Goals	Apps	Goals	Apps	Goals	Apps	Goals
Paykan	Pro League	2014–15	1	0	2	0	–	–	3	0
Paykan	Division 1	2015–16	15	1	0	0	–	–	15	1
Paykan	Pro League	2016–17	9	0	0	0	–	–	9	0
Paykan	Pro League	2017–18	16	3	0	0	–	–	16	3
Career Totals			41	4	2	0	0	0	43	4
