= Reza Azari =

Iranian football midfielder

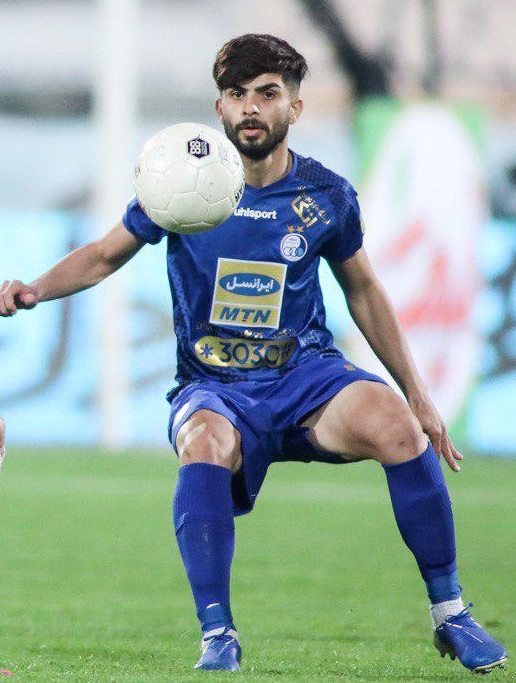

Personal information
- Date of birth: 10 February 1998 (age 28)
- Place of birth: Ardabil, Iran
- Height: 1.76 m (5 ft 9 in)
- Position: Central midfielder

Team information
- Current team: Bandar Astara
- Number: 67

Youth career
- 2010–2019: Esteghlal
- 2015–2018: → Moghavemat Tehran (loan)

Senior career*
Years	Team	Apps	(Gls)
2018–2022	Esteghlal	13	(1)
2021	→ Machine Sazi (loan)	2	(0)
2023	Saipa	8	(1)
2023–2024	Kheybar	4	(0)
2024	Bandar Astara	12	(0)
2024–2025	Damash Gilan	11	(0)
2025–	Bandar Astara	9	(0)
- * Club domestic league appearances and goals as of 22 April 2025

Reza Azari (Persian: رضا آذری, born 10 February 1998) is an Iranian football midfielder who plays for Bandar Astara in Azadegan League.

== Club career ==
=== Esteghlal ===
On 12 June 2018, he signed a five-year contract with Esteghlal. He made his debut for Esteghlal Tehran on 27 July 2018 against Paykan as a substitute for Ali Karimi.

== Honours ==
=== Esteghlal ===
- Iran Pro League: 2021–22
- Hazfi Cup runner-up: 2019–20
