= Meysam Teymouri =

Iranian footballer (born 1992)

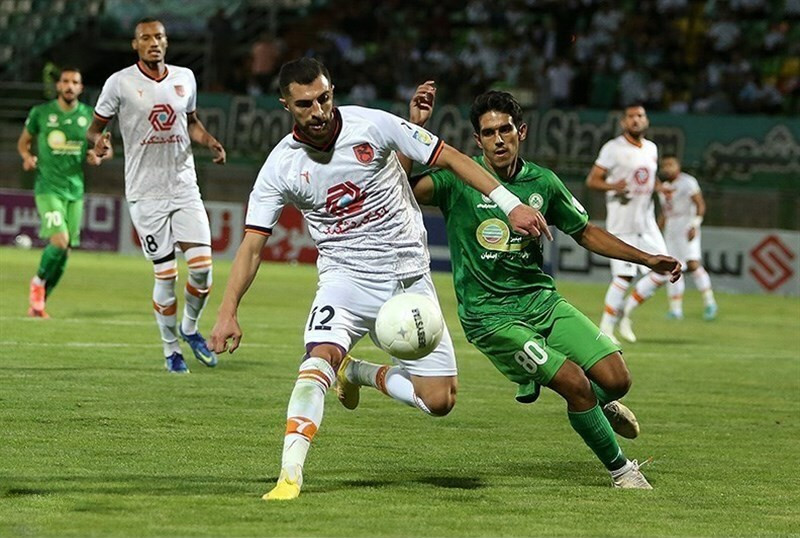
- Teymouri with Tractor in 2019

Personal information
- Date of birth: 6 July 1992 (age 34)
- Place of birth: Savadkuh, Iran
- Height: 1.86 m (6 ft 1 in)
- Position: Left back

Team information
- Current team: Peykan
- Number: 12

Youth career
- 2011–2013: Esteghlal Jonoub

Senior career*
Years	Team	Apps	(Gls)
2013–2016	Nassaji Mazandaran	33	(1)
2016–2018	Pars Jonoubi Jam	50	(2)
2018–2019	Esteghlal	3	(0)
2019–2021	Tractor	51	(2)
2021–2025	Mes Rafsanjan	87	(4)
2025-	Peykan		
- * Club domestic league appearances and goals as of 14 December 2025

Meysam Teymouri (Persian: میثم تیموری; born 6 July 1992) is an Iranian footballer who plays for Peykan in the Persian Gulf Pro League.

== Club career ==
=== Esteghlal ===
Meysam Teymouri joined Esteghlal team in the summer of 2018 with the signing of a three-year contract by Seyed Pendar Toufighi, in charge of transfers.

=== Tractor ===
He joined the Tractor in the summer of 2019.

He played in the National Cup in the final match between Tractor and Esteghlal in the National 2019–20 Hazfi Cup; he bravely put his head in front of the opponent's shot and saved Tractor's goal and the team's championship.

=== Mes Rafsanjan ===
Teymouri spent four seasons (2021–2025) with Mes Rafsanjan, scoring four goals for the club.

== Career statistics ==
As of 1 June 2018.

Club	Division	Season	League		Hazfi Cup		Asia		Other		Total	
Club	Division	Season	Apps	Goals	Apps	Goals	Apps	Goals	Apps	Goals	Apps	Goals
Nassaji Mazandaran	Division 1	2014–15	5	0	0	0	–	–	0	0	5	0
Nassaji Mazandaran	Division 1	2015–16	28	1	0	0	–	–	0	0	28	1
Nassaji Mazandaran	Total		33	1	0	0	0	0	0	0	33	1
Pars Jonoubi	Azadegan League	2016–17	31	2	1	0	–	–	0	0	32	2
Pars Jonoubi	Iran Pro League	2017–18	19	0	0	0	-	-	0	0	19	0
Pars Jonoubi	Total		50	2	1	0	0	0	0	0	51	2
Esteghlal	Iran Pro League	2018-19	3	0	0	0	0	0	0	0	3	0
Tractor	Iran Pro League	2019-20	25	0	4	0	-	-	0	0	25	0
Tractor	Iran Pro League	2020-21	26	2	1	0	5	0	1	0	33	2
Tractor	Total		51	2	5	0	5	0	1	0	62	2
Mes Rafsanjan	Persian Gulf Pro League	2021-22	22	1	2	0	0	0	0	0	24	1
Mes Rafsanjan	Persian Gulf Pro League	2022-23	19	1	2	0	0	0	0	0	21	1
Mes Rafsanjan	Persian Gulf Pro League	2023-24	21	1	2	0	0	0	0	0	23	1
Mes Rafsanjan	Total		62	3	6	0	0	0	0	0	68	3
Career Totals			199	8	12	0	5	0	1	0	217	8

== Honours ==
Tractor

- Hazfi Cup (1): 2019–20
