= Hakim Nassari =

Iranian footballer

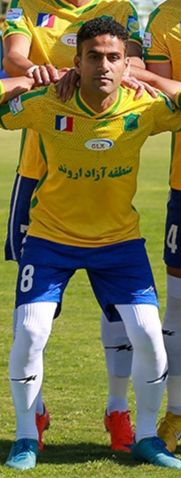

Personal information
- Date of birth: 22 December 1986 (age 39)
- Place of birth: Mahshahr, Iran
- Height: 1.83 m (6 ft 0 in)
- Position: Midfielder

Senior career*
Years	Team	Apps	(Gls)
2010–2011	Naft Masjed Soleyman	23	(8)
2011–2013	Foolad	36	(4)
2013	→ Paykan (loan)	15	(0)
2013–2014	Naft Masjed Soleyman	23	(7)
2014–2015	Saipa	24	(3)
2015–2016	Esteghlal Khuzestan	27	(0)
2016–2017	Sanat Naft Abadan	28	(5)
2017–2018	Esteghlal Khuzestan	24	(1)
2018–2019	Naft Masjed Soleyman	27	(3)
2019–2020	Esteghlal Khuzestan	19	(5)
2020–2024	Sanat Naft Abadan	82	(3)
- * Club domestic league appearances and goals as of 30 December 2023

Hakim Nassari (Persian: حکیم نصاری; born 22 December 1986) is an Iranian football forward.

== Club career ==
=== Foolad ===
Nassari joined Foolad in summer 2011 with a 3-year contract. He made his debut for Foolad against Shahin Bushehr on 2 August 2011 as a starter. In his first season at Foolad, he was usually used as a regular starter. Nassari finished the season with 30 appearances and four goals. In his second season in Foolad he mostly benched and just made five appearances.

=== Paykan (loan) ===
In winter 2013 he joined Paykan until the end of the season on loan from Foolad. He finished the season with 15 appearances but he couldn't help Paykan to escape from relegation.

=== Naft Masjed Soleyman ===
Nassari joined Naft Masjed Soleyman in summer 2013. He helped Naft win promotion to Pro League while he scored seven times in 21 matches.

=== Saipa ===
After shining in the Azadegan League, he reunited with his former coach at Foolad, Majid Jalali. He made his debut for Saipa in a match against his former club, Naft MIS in season debut as a starter.

== Club career statistics ==
As of 25 December 2017.

Club	Division	Season	League		Hazfi Cup		Asia		Total	
Club	Division	Season	Apps	Goals	Apps	Goals	Apps	Goals	Apps	Goals
Naft MIS	Division 1	2010–11	23	8	2	0	–	–	25	8
Foolad	Pro League	2012–13	30	4	3	0	–	–	33	4
Foolad	Pro League	2012–13	5	0	0	0	–	–	5	0
Paykan	Pro League	2012–13	15	0	0	0	–	–	15	0
Naft MIS	Division 1	2013–14	23	7	4	1	–	–	27	8
Saipa	Pro League	2014–15	24	3	2	0	–	–	26	3
Esteghlal Khuzestan	Pro League	2015-16	27	0	0	0	–	–	27	0
Sanat Naft	Pro League	2016-17	20	5	0	0	–	–	20	5
Esteghlal Khuzestan	Pro League	2017-18	11	0	0	0	–	–	11	0
Career Totals			178	27	11	1	0	0	182	28

== Honours ==
Esteghlal Khuzestan

- Iran Pro League (1): 2015–16
