= Amirhossein Kargar =

Iranian footballer (born 1998)

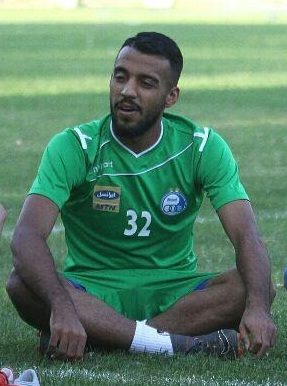

Personal information
- Full name: Amirhossein Kargar Shouraki
- Date of birth: November 22, 1998 (age 27)
- Place of birth: Tehran, Iran
- Positions: Right-back; right winger

Team information
- Current team: Malavan

Youth career
- 2015–2016: PAS
- 2016–2017: Rah Ahan
- 2017: PAS
- 2017–2020: Esteghlal

Senior career*
Years	Team	Apps	(Gls)
2019–2020	Esteghlal	1	(0)
2020–2021	Gol Gohar Sirjan	2	(0)
2021–	Malavan	0	(0)
- * Club domestic league appearances and goals

Amirhossein Kargar (Persian: امیرحسین کارگر; born November 22, 1998) is an Iranian footballer who currently plays as a right-back for Iranian club Malavan in the Azadegan League.

== Club career ==
=== Esteghlal ===
He made his debut for Esteghlal in last fixtures of 2019–20 Iran Pro League against Shahin Bushehr while he substituted in for Mehdi Ghayedi.
