= Meraj Pourtaghi =

Footballer

Personal information
- Date of birth: 16 March 1998 (age 28)
- Place of birth: Tonekabon, Iran
- Height: 1.81 m (5 ft 11 in)
- Position: Forward

Youth career
- 2014–2016: Moghavemat Tehran
- 2016–2018: Paykan
- 2018–2019: Esteghlal

Senior career*
Years	Team	Apps	(Gls)
2018–2019	Esteghlal	0	(0)
2019–2020	Damash Gilan	15	(1)
2020–2022	Shahr Khodro	32	(2)
2023	Khooshe Talaei Saveh	4	(2)
2023–2024	Ario Eslamshahr	0	(0)
2024	Iranjavan		
2024	Darya Caspian	0	(0)
- * Club domestic league appearances and goals as of 22 October 2024

Meraj Pourtaghi (Persian: معراج پورتقی; born 18 March 1998) is an Irainian footballer who plays as a forward.

== Club career ==
=== Shahr Khodro ===
He made his debut for Shahr Khodro in the second fixtures of 2020–21 Iran Pro League against Paykan while he substituted in for Rouhollah Seifollahi.
