= 1969–70 DFB-Pokal =

Tournament details
- Country: West Germany
- Teams: 32

Final positions
- Champions: Kickers Offenbach
- Runners-up: 1. FC Köln

Tournament statistics
- Matches played: 34

The 1969–70 DFB-Pokal was the 27th season of the annual German football cup competition. It began on 3 January 1970 and ended on 29 August 1970. 32 teams competed in the tournament of five rounds. In the final Kickers Offenbach defeated 1. FC Köln 2–1.

== Mode ==
The tournament consisted of five single elimination rounds. In case a game ended with a draw 30 minutes of extra time were played. If the score was still level the game was replayed with 30 minutes of extra time in case of another draw. If still no winner could be determined the team to advance to the next round was determined by drawing.

As the 1970 FIFA World Cup began on 31 May the German Football Association, scheduled all games except the first round to take place in the summer break after the World Cup. Beginning with the second round the clubs therefore played with the roster for the 1970–71 Bundesliga season.

== Matches ==
=== First round ===
3 January 1970
Eintracht Gelsenkirchen	1 – 3	Borussia Mönchengladbach
1. FC Nürnberg	1 – 0	VfB Stuttgart
Kickers Offenbach	4 – 1	TSV 1860 München
Hannover 96	3 – 2	Rot-Weiß Oberhausen
Jahn Regensburg	1 – 0	Eintracht Braunschweig
FC 08 Villingen	1 – 3	Hamburger SV
24 March 1970
Rot-Weiß Essen	3 – 3	1. FC Köln	(AET)
25 March 1970
SG Wattenscheid 09	1 – 6	FC Bayern Munich
26 March 1970
Göttingen 05	0 – 1	MSV Duisburg	(AET)
Wuppertaler SV Borussia	1 – 0	1. FC Kaiserslautern
VfL Osnabrück	1 – 2	Eintracht Frankfurt	(AET)
8 April 1970
SV Alsenborn	1 – 5	FC Schalke 04
15 April 1970
FK Pirmasens	1 – 2	Hertha BSC
22 April 1970
Schwarz-Weiß Essen	1 – 2	Borussia Dortmund
5 May 1970
Tennis Borussia Berlin	0 – 2	SV Werder Bremen
11 July 1970
Arminia Hannover	0 – 3	Alemannia Aachen

==== Replay ====
25 July 1970
1. FC Köln	5 – 1	Rot-Weiß Essen

=== Round of 16 ===
28 July 1970
FC Schalke 04	0 – 0	Hertha BSC	(AET)
29 July 1970
FC Bayern Munich	4 – 0	Jahn Regensburg
Hannover 96	1 – 3	Borussia Mönchengladbach
Eintracht Frankfurt	2 – 0	Hamburger SV
Wuppertaler SV Borussia	0 – 3	1. FC Nürnberg
1. FC Köln	6 – 1	MSV Duisburg
Alemannia Aachen	1 – 1	SV Werder Bremen	(AET)
29 July 1970
Kickers Offenbach	2 – 1	Borussia Dortmund	(AET)

==== Replays ====
1 August 1970
Hertha BSC	4 – 0	FC Schalke 04
SV Werder Bremen	1 – 1	Alemannia Aachen^{*}	(AET)

^{*} Aachen won by drawing as both games were tied.

=== Quarter-finals ===
5 August 1970
Borussia Mönchengladbach	2 – 3	1. FC Köln	(AET)
1. FC Nürnberg	2 – 1	FC Bayern Munich
Eintracht Frankfurt	0 – 3	Kickers Offenbach
6 August 1970
Alemannia Aachen	1 – 0	Hertha BSC

=== Semi-finals ===
19 August 1970
Alemannia Aachen	0 – 4	1. FC Köln
Kickers Offenbach	4 – 2	1. FC Nürnberg	(AET)

=== Final ===
29 August 1970
16:00 CET

1. FC Köln	1–2	Kickers Offenbach
Löhr 73'	Report	Winkler 27'; Gecks 64'

Niedersachsenstadion, Hanover
Attendance: 50,000
Referee: Gerhard Schulenburg (Hamburg)
