= Markus Neumayr =

German footballer (born 1986)

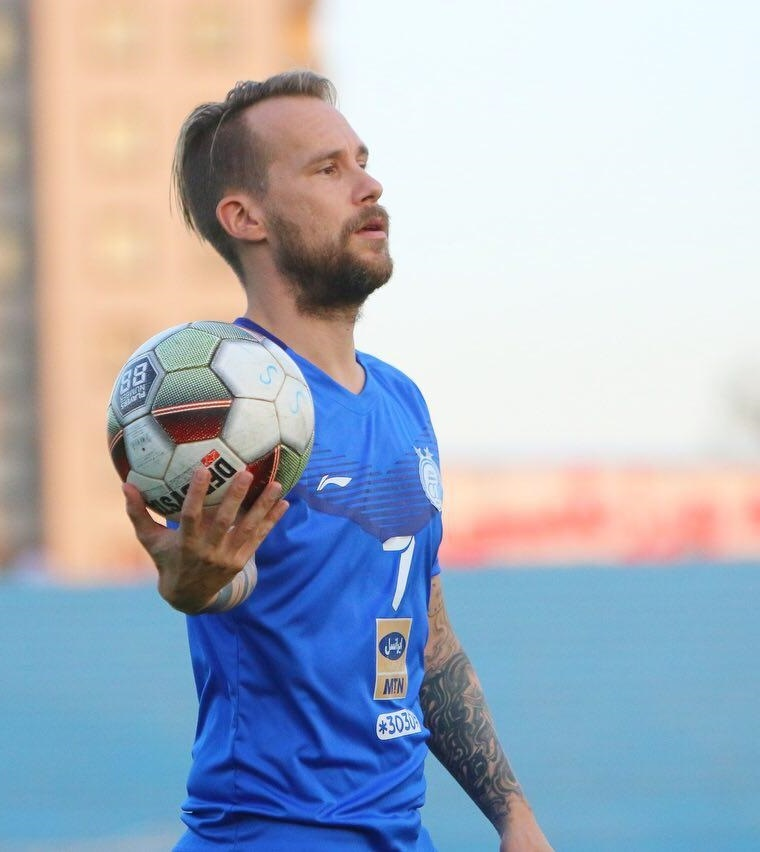
- Neumayr with Esteghlal in 2018

Personal information
- Full name: Markus Martin Neumayr
- Date of birth: 26 March 1986 (age 40)
- Place of birth: Hösbach, West Germany
- Height: 1.84 m (6 ft 0 in)
- Position: Attacking midfielder

Youth career
- 2001–2002: SpVgg Hösbach
- 2002–2003: Viktoria Aschaffenburg
- 2003: Eintracht Frankfurt
- 2003–2006: Manchester United

Senior career*
Years	Team	Apps	(Gls)
2006–2008	MSV Duisburg	9	(0)
2006–2008	→ MSV Duisburg II	25	(15)
2008–2009	Zulte Waregem	7	(0)
2009–2010	Rot-Weiß Essen	26	(3)
2009–2010	→ Rot-Weiss Essen II	3	(1)
2010–2011	Wacker Burghausen	4	(0)
2011	Thun	13	(2)
2011–2013	Bellinzona	52	(9)
2013–2015	FC Vaduz	69	(18)
2016–2017	FC Luzern	43	(12)
2017–2018	Kasımpaşa	22	(3)
2018	Esteghlal	8	(0)
2018–2020	FC Aarau	44	(12)
2021	FC Linth 04	12	(4)
Total		337	(79)

International career
2002	Germany U16	2	(1)
2004	Germany U19	3	(0)

Managerial career
- 2021: FC Linth 04 (player assistant)
- 2022–: FC Linth 04 (assistant)
- * Club domestic league appearances and goals

Markus Martin Neumayr (born 26 March 1986) is a German former professional footballer who played as an attacking midfielder.

== Club career ==
Born in Hösbach, Neumayr started his football career playing for local clubs before moving to Eintracht Frankfurt in 2003 However, within a few months, he was picked up by Manchester United. During his spell with Manchester United, he played on the right side of midfield, although on some occasions he would play in the middle of the park.

In the three seasons Neumayr spent at Old Trafford, he never played in a match for the first team. He was once called into the squad on 29 March 2006 for the match against West Ham United but did not make the final sixteen. When David Fox departed to Blackpool, Neumayr took on the role of reserve team captain. With this added responsibility, many believed it would only be a matter of time before he would go on and make the first team. However, this never materialised, and Neumayr was released from the club at his own request at the end of the 2005–06 season, joining MSV Duisburg. After a year with Zulte Waregem he signed in summer 2009 for Rot-Weiss Essen.

On 20 June 2008, Neumayr signed a deal at Belgian First Division club Zulte Waregem. His contract at Duisburg was not renewed, and so he was able to join Zulte Waregem on a free transfer. In January 2009, he returned to Germany, signing for RW Essen. In April 2010 he announced his transfer to Wacker Burghausen for the 2010–11 season., before joining FC Thun the following January. Neumayr joined AC Bellinzona (Swiss Challenge League) in June 2011.

In January 2016, he signed a one-and-a-half-year contract with FC Luzern. Neumayr became a Swiss citizen in March 2017.

On 31 July 2018, Neumayr signed for Persian Gulf Pro League club Esteghlal on a two-year contract. On 16 December, Neumayr was released by Esteghlal along with Alhaji Gero, after both players failed to perform well.

On 31 December 2018, Neumayr joined the Swiss side Aarau.

== International career ==
Neumayr was born in Germany and was a former youth international for Germany. He left Germany at the age of 16, and in 2011 moved to Switzerland. He has gained Swiss citizenship, and has a Swiss wife and children. He is open to representing the Switzerland national team.

== Honours ==
Vaduz

- Swiss Challenge League: 2013–14
- Liechtensteiner Cup: 2013–14, 2014–15
