= Sajjad Aghaei =

Iranian footballer

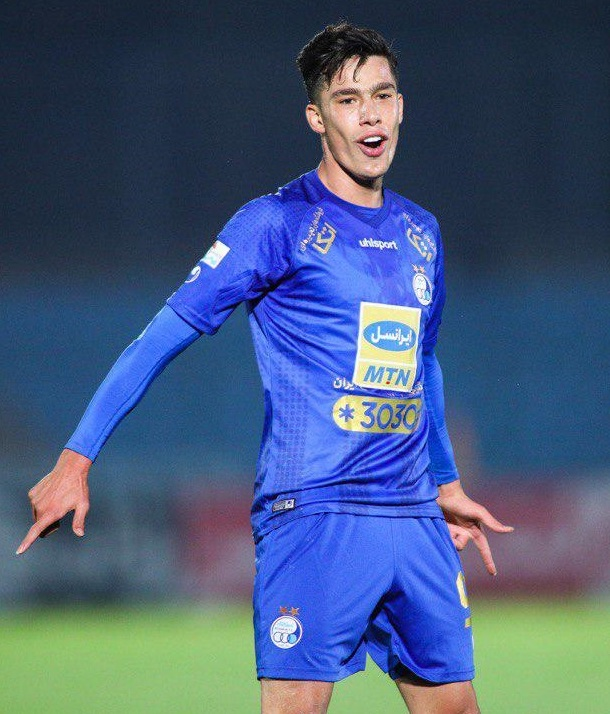

Personal information
- Full name: Seyed Sajjad Aghaei
- Date of birth: 19 March 1999 (age 27)
- Place of birth: Arak, Iran
- Height: 1.80 m (5 ft 11 in)
- Position: Forward

Team information
- Current team: Shahr Raz Shiraz
- Number: 17

Youth career
- 2015–2016: Naft Tehran
- 2016–2017: Persepolis
- 2017–2021: Esteghlal

Senior career*
Years	Team	Apps	(Gls)
2017–2021	Esteghlal	9	(1)
2017–2018	→ Aluminium Arak (loan)	6	(1)
2020	→ Zob Ahan (loan)	1	(0)
2021	→ Nassaji Mazandaran (loan)	5	(0)
2021–2024	Aluminium Arak	5	(1)
2024	Chadormalou	0	(0)
2024–	Shahr Raz Shiraz	2	(0)

International career^{‡}
2017	Iran U19	5	(0)
- * Club domestic league appearances and goals as of 29 October 2024 ‡ National team caps and goals as of 8 November 2017

Sajjad Aghaei (Persian: سجاد آقایی, born 19 March 1999) is an Iranian football forward who plays for Shahr Raz Shiraz in Azadegan League.

== Club career ==
=== Esteghlal ===
On 3 July 2017, he signed a five-year contract with Esteghlal. He made his debut for Esteghlal Tehran on 27 July 2018 against Paykan.

=== Aluminum Arak ===
He played 6 games for Aluminum this season and scored 1 goal.

== Club career statistics ==
As of 3 March 2017

Club	Season	League			Hazfi Cup		Asia		Exhibition game		Total	
Club	Season	League	Apps	Goals	Apps	Goals	Apps	Goals	Apps	Goals	Apps	Goals
Aluminium Arak	2017–18	Azadegan League	6	1	0	0	—				6	1
Esteghlal	2018–19	Iran Pro League	1	0	0	0	0	0			1	0
Career total			7	1	0	0	0	0			7	1
