= Farshid Bagheri =

Iranian footballer

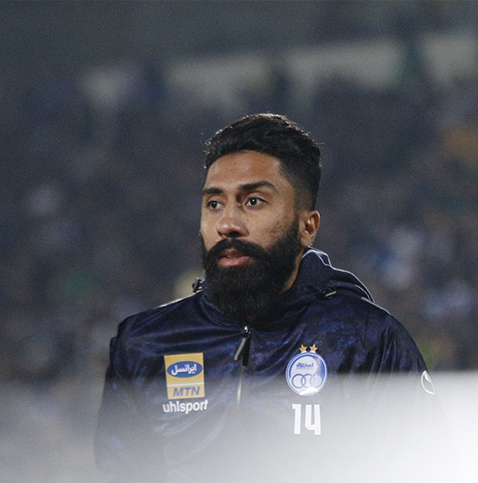

Personal information
- Date of birth: 5 June 1992 (age 34)
- Place of birth: Kerman, Iran
- Height: 1.85 m (6 ft 1 in)
- Positions: Midfielder; centre back

Team information
- Current team: Paykan
- Number: 14

Youth career
- –2010: Mes Kerman

Senior career*
Years	Team	Apps	(Gls)
2010–2012	Mes Kerman	1	(0)
2012–2014	Etka Gorgan	34	(7)
2014–2016	Saba Qom	40	(2)
2016–2021	Esteghlal	81	(6)
2021–2022	Gol Gohar	27	(2)
2022–2025	Mes Rafsanjan	64	(5)
2025	Foolad	9	(0)
2026–	Paykan	13	(0)
- * Club domestic league appearances and goals as of 1 May 2025

Farshid Bagheri (Persian: فرشید باقری; born 5 June 1992) is an Iranian football midfielder who plays for the Iranian football club Paykan in the Persian Gulf Pro League.

== Club career ==
=== Early years ===
Bagheri started his career with Mes Kerman from youth levels. As of summer 2012 he joined Etka Gorgan. He was part of Etka Gorgan in promoting to 2014–15 Azadegan League.

=== Saba Qom ===
He joined Saba Qom on June 2, 2014, with a 2-year contract. He made his debut against Naft Tehran on November 7, 2014, as a substitute for Hossein Badamaki.

=== Esteghlal ===
On 4 June 2016, he joined Esteghlal on a two-year contract.

After 5 seasons in Esteghlal, he left Esteghlal in 2021 and joined Gol Gohar.

== Club career statistics ==
As of 9 May 2018.

Club	Division	Season	League		Hazfi Cup		Asia		Total	
Club	Division	Season	Apps	Goals	Apps	Goals	Apps	Goals	Apps	Goals
Mes Kerman	Pro League	2010–11	1	0	1	0	–	–	2	0
Mes Kerman	Pro League	2011–12	0	0	0	0	–	–	0	0
Mes Kerman	Total		1	0	1	0	0	0	2	0
Etka Gorgan	Division 1	2012–13	13	0	–	–	–	–	13	0
Saba Qom	Pro League	2014–15	14	0	1	0	–	–	15	0
Saba Qom	Pro League	2015–16	26	2	2	0	–	–	28	2
Saba Qom	Total		40	2	3	0	0	0	43	2
Esteghlal	Pro League	2016–17	17	2	4	0	6	0	25	2
Esteghlal	Pro League	2017–18	17	0	3	0	7	0	25	0
Esteghlal	Pro League	2018-19	22	3	2	0	3	1	25	4
Esteghlal	Pro League	2019-20	15	0	1	0	5	0	21	0
Esteghlal	Pro League	2020-21	10	1	0	0	0	0	10	1
Esteghlal	Total		81	6	10	0	21	1	112	7
Gol Gohar	Pro League	2020-21	8	0	0	0	0	0	8	0
Gol Gohar	Pro League	2021-22	19	2	0	0	0	0	19	2
Gol Gohar	Total		27	2	0	0	0	2	27	2
Mes Rafsanjan	Pro League	2022-23	25	1	2	0	0	0	27	1
Mes Rafsanjan	Pro League	2023-24	27	3	5	0	0	0	32	3
Mes Rafsanjan	Total		52	4	7	0	0	0	59	4
Career Totals			214	14	21	0	21	1	256	15

== Honours ==
Esteghlal

- Hazfi Cup (1) : 2017–18
