= Morteza Aghakhan =

Iranian footballer

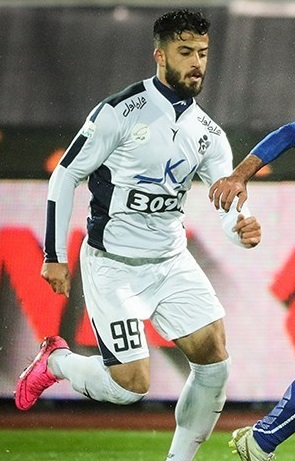

Personal information
- Full name: Morteza Aghakhan Mahhalati
- Date of birth: 5 April 1993 (age 33)
- Place of birth: Alard, Robat Karim, Iran
- Height: 1.75 m (5 ft 9 in)
- Positions: Winger; striker

Team information
- Current team: Legentus FC

Youth career
- 2007–2008: Houd-e Kan
- 2008–2010: Persepolis
- 2010–2012: Steel Azin
- 2012–2013: Mes Rafsanjan
- 2013–2014: Paykan

Senior career*
Years	Team	Apps	(Gls)
2012–2013	Mes Rafsanjan	4	(0)
2013–2018	Paykan	86	(23)
2018–2020	Esteghlal	0	(0)
2020	→ Saipa (loan)	9	(0)
2020–2021	Aluminium Arak	13	(2)
2021–2022	Havadar	3	(0)
2022–2023	Pars Jonoubi Jam	13	(3)
2023	Bandar Astara	5	(1)
2023	Golchin Robat Karim		
2023–2024	Damash Gilan	1	(0)
2024	Nika Pars Chaloos	7	(2)
2024–2025	Mes Kerman	5	(0)
2025-	Legentus FC	0	(0)

International career^{‡}
2014–2016	Iran U23		
- * Club domestic league appearances and goals as of 29 October 2024 ‡ National team caps and goals as of 15 January 2014

Morteza Aghakhan Mahhalati (Persian: مرتضی آقاخان محلاتی, born 5 April 1993) is an Iranian professional footballer who plays for emirati club Legentus FC.

== Club career ==
=== Mes Rafsanjan ===
He was chosen by Bahman Foroutan for Mes Rafsanjan's first team while he was 19 and he made 4 appearances in 2012–13 Division 1.

=== Paykan ===
Aghakhan joined Paykan in summer 2013. He made his debut for Paykan on November 10, 2013, against Iranjavan as a starter. He scored his first goal for Paykan in his second appearance for them against Badr Bandar Kong.

=== Esteghlal ===
On 31 May 2018, Aghakhan officially signed for Esteghlal.

== International career ==
He was called up by Nelo Vingada to the Iran U-23 training camp to prepare for the 2014 Asian Games and 2016 AFC U-23 Championship.

== Career statistics ==
As of 31 May 2018.

Club	Division	Season	League		Hazfi Cup		Asia		Total	
Club	Division	Season	Apps	Goals	Apps	Goals	Apps	Goals	Apps	Goals
Mes Rafsanjan	Azadegan League	2012–13	4	0	1	0	—		5	0
Paykan	Azadegan League	2013–14	9	3	1	0	—		10	3
Paykan	Persian Gulf Pro League	2014–15	12	0	0	0	—		12	0
Paykan	Azadegan League	2015–16	30	8	1	0	—		32	8
Paykan	Persian Gulf Pro League	2016–17	20	6	1	0	—		21	6
Paykan	Persian Gulf Pro League	2017–18	15	6	1	0	—		16	6
Paykan	Total		86	23	4	0	–		90	23
Esteghlal	Persian Gulf Pro League	2018–19	0	0	0	0	0	0	0	0
Career totals			90	23	5	0	0	0	95	23

== Honours ==
Paykan

- Azadegan League: 2015–16
