= Amirhossein Pourmohammad =

Iranian footballer (born 1998)

Personal information
- Full name: Amirhossein Pourmohammad
- Date of birth: May 24, 1998 (age 28)
- Place of birth: Tehran, Iran
- Height: 1.77 m (5 ft 10 in)
- Position: Left-back

Team information
- Current team: Havadar
- Number: 3

Youth career
- 2015–2016: Moghavemat Tehran
- 2016–2018: Paykan
- 2018–2019: Esteghlal

Senior career*
Years	Team	Apps	(Gls)
2018–2019	Esteghlal	0	(0)
2019–	Havadar	54	(2)
- * Club domestic league appearances and goals

Amirhossein Pourmohammad (Persian: امیرحسین پورمحمد ; born May 24, 1998) is an Iranian football player who played as a defender for Iranian club Havadar in the Persian Gulf Pro League.

== Club career ==
=== Havadar ===
He made his debut for Havadar in 24th fixtures of 2019–20 Azadegan League against Sepidrood.
