= Farshad Mohammadi Mehr =

Iranian footballer

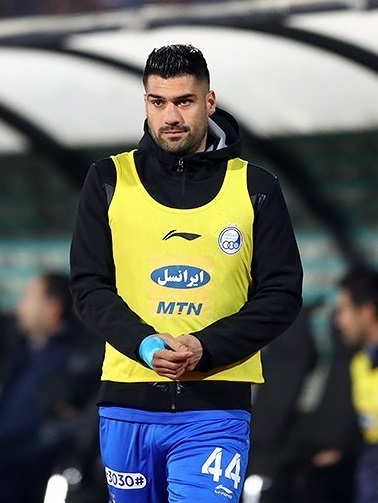

Personal information
- Date of birth: 4 September 1994 (age 32)
- Place of birth: Khomeyn, Iran
- Height: 1.81 m (5 ft 11 in)
- Position: Right back

Team information
- Current team: Kheybar Khorramabad
- Number: 44

Youth career
- 2009–2014: Zob Ahan

Senior career*
Years	Team	Apps	(Gls)
2012–2015	Zob Ahan B	31	(4)
2015–2016	Giti Pasand	30	(0)
2016–2018	Pars Jonoubi	52	(2)
2018–2019	Esteghlal	9	(0)
2019	Shahr Khodro	12	(0)
2020–2021	Zob Ahan	38	(4)
2021–2023	Mes Rafsanjan	25	(0)
2023–2024	Zob Ahan	8	(0)
2024	Sanat Naft	12	(1)
2024–2025	Havadar	4	(0)
2025	Sanat Naft	16	(1)
2025–2026	Nassaji Mazandaran	31	(3)
2026–	Kheybar Khorramabad	7	(0)
- * Club domestic league appearances and goals as of 7 December 2025

Farshad Mohammadi Mehr (Persian: فرشاد محمدی‌مهر; born 4 September 1994) is an Iranian midfielder who plays for Kheybar Khorramabad in the Persian Gulf Pro League.

== Club career statistics ==
As of 1 June 2018.

Club	Division	Season	League		Hazfi Cup		Asia		Total	
Club	Division	Season	Apps	Goals	Apps	Goals	Apps	Goals	Apps	Goals
Giti Pasand	Division 1	2015–16	30	0	0	0	–	–	30	0
Pars Jonoubi	Azadegan League	2016–17	24	1	1	0	–	–	25	0
Pars Jonoubi	Iran Pro League	2017–18	28	1	1	0	0	0	29	1
Pars Jonoubi	Total		52	2	2	0	0	0	54	2
Esteghlal	Persian Gulf Pro League	2018–19	9	0	1	0	–	–	10	0
Padideh	Persian Gulf Pro League	2019–20	12	0	1	0	–	–	13	0
Zob Ahan	Persian Gulf Pro League	2019-20	12	0	0	0	–	–	12	0
Zob Ahan	Persian Gulf Pro League	2020–21	26	4	2	0	–	–	28	4
Zob Ahan	Total		38	4	2	0	0	0	40	4
Mes Rafsanjan	Persian Gulf Pro League	2021-22	24	0	3	0	0	0	27	0
Zob Ahan	Persian Gulf Pro League	2023-24	8	0	0	0	0	0	8	0
Sanat Naft	Persian Gulf Pro League	2023-24	12	1	0	0	0	0	12	1
Career totals			185	7	9	0	0	0	194	7
