= Ali Karimi (footballer, born 1994) =

Iranian footballer

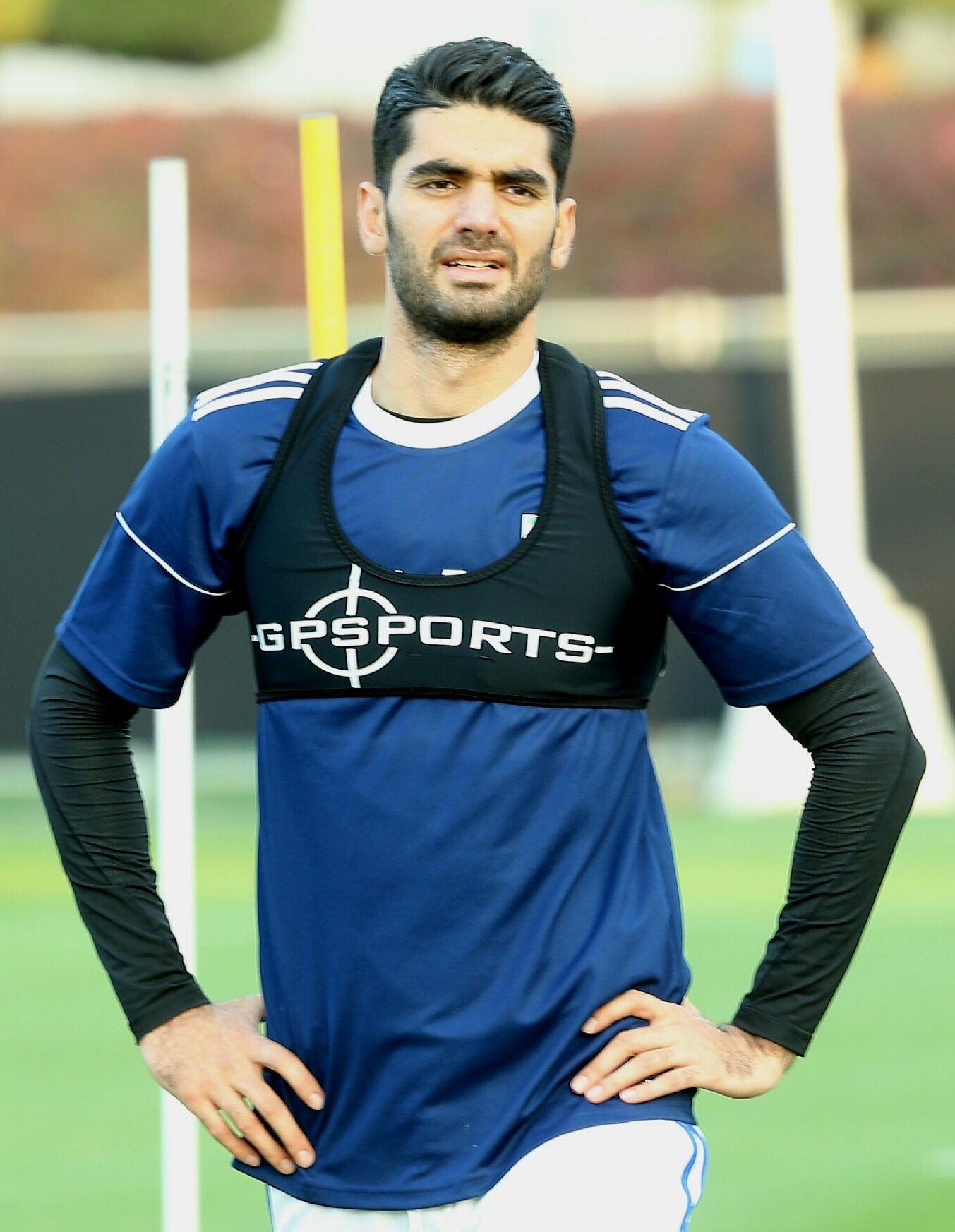
- Karimi in 2018

Personal information
- Full name: Ali Nozar Karimi
- Date of birth: 11 February 1994 (age 32)
- Place of birth: Isfahan, Iran
- Height: 1.85 m (6 ft 1 in)
- Position: Midfielder

Youth career
- 2004–2012: Sepahan

Senior career*
| Years | Team | Apps | (Gls) |
| 2012–2016 | Sepahan | 65 | (4) |
| 2016 | Dinamo Zagreb II | 9 | (0) |
| 2016–2017 | Dinamo Zagreb | 1 | (0) |
| 2017 | → Lokomotiva (loan) | 8 | (1) |
| 2017–2018 | Sepahan | 20 | (1) |
| 2018–2020 | Esteghlal | 53 | (7) |
| 2020–2021 | Qatar SC | 7 | (0) |
| 2021 | → Al-Duhail (loan) | 9 | (0) |
| 2021–2025 | Kayserispor | 78 | (6) |
| 2026 | Sepahan | 0 | (0) |

International career^{‡}
| 2014–2016 | Iran U23 | 18 | (6) |
| 2016–2023 | Iran | 19 | (0) |
- * Club domestic league appearances and goals as of 24 August 2025 ‡ National team caps and goals as of 21 November 2023

Ali Nozar Karimi (Persian: علی کریمی; born 11 February 1994) is an Iranian professional footballer who plays as a midfielder.

== Club career ==
=== Sepahan ===
Karimi joined Sepahan in the summer of 2012. From 2010 to 2012, he was a member of Sepahan under-19 football team. He made his first league appearance in the 2013–14 season. He won the Persian Gulf Pro League with Sepahan in the 2014–15 season.

=== Dinamo Zagreb ===
==== 2016–17 ====
On 1 July 2016, Karimi joined Croatian champions Dinamo Zagreb on a five-year contract for a reported US$400,000 transfer fee. He is the first Iranian to play in Croatian Prva HNL. Karimi made his preseason debut on 2 July 2016, coming on as a second-half substitute against Romanian club CS Pandurii Târgu Jiu.

==== Loan to Lokomotiva ====
Karimi joined Dinamo Zagreb's feeder club Lokomotiva in January 2017 on a 6-month loan. He finally got a chance to show off his power and control in the midfield as he started six games for Lokomotiva, set up multiple goals and scored his first goal in the Croatian league for the NK Lokomotiva on 26 April 2017 in a 1–0 league victory against Istra 1961.

=== Esteghlal ===
On 15 July 2018, Karimi joined Esteghlal signing a one-year contract with the club.

=== Qatar SC ===
On 1 November 2020, Karimi joined Qatar SC, signing a one-year contract with the club.

=== Kayserispor ===
In July 2020, Karimi joined Kayserispor as a free agent.

== International career ==
=== Youth ===
Karimi was invited to Iran U-23 training camp by Nelo Vingada in preparation for Incheon 2014 and 2016 AFC U-22 Championship (Summer Olympic qualification). He was named for the Iran U23 and on the final roster for Incheon 2014.

=== Senior ===
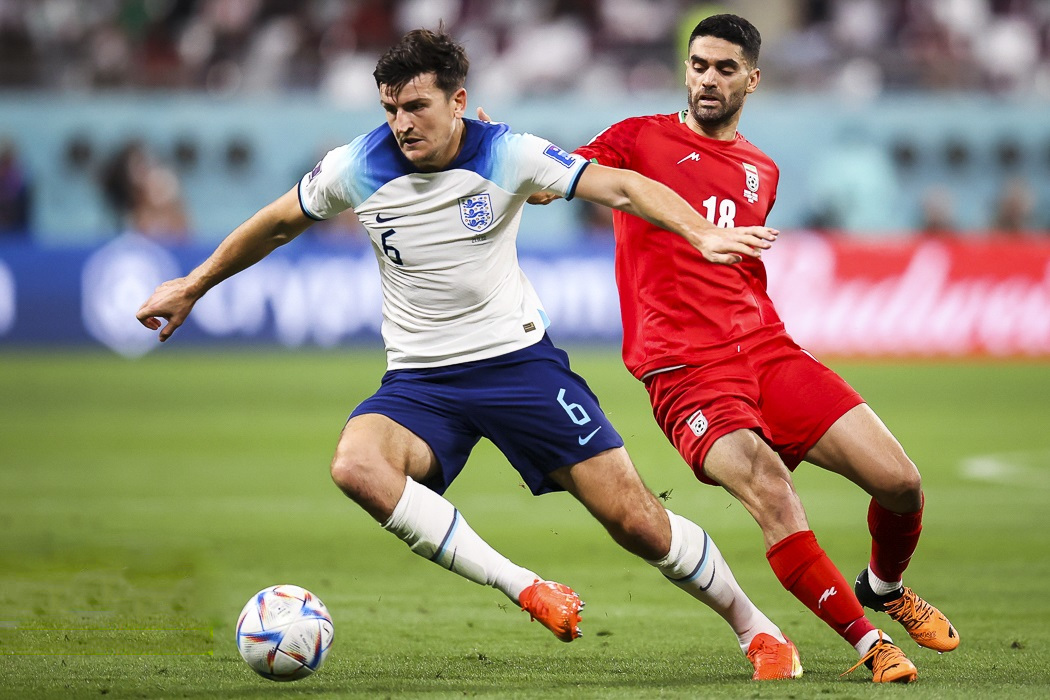
Karimi (right) with Iran at the 2022 FIFA World Cup

Karimi was called to the national team in March 2014 but did not play a game. He was called up again to the senior Iran squad for a 2018 FIFA World Cup qualifier against India in September 2015. He made his debut against Papua New Guinea on 10 November 2016 in a friendly match.

In May 2018, Karimi was named in Iran's preliminary squad for the 2018 World Cup in Russia. but did not make the final 23 because of injury. He was included in the final list for the 2022 World Cup by Carlos Queiroz.

== Career statistics ==
=== Club ===
As of 24 August 2025

| Club | Season | League | | | National cup | | Continental | | Other | | Total | |
| Club | Season | Division | Apps | Goals | Apps | Goals | Apps | Goals | Apps | Goals | Apps | Goals |
|---|---|---|---|---|---|---|---|---|---|---|---|---|
| Sepahan | 2012–13 | Persian Gulf Pro League | 0 | 0 | 0 | 0 | 1 | 0 | 0 | 0 | 1 | 0 |
| Sepahan | 2013–14 | Persian Gulf Pro League | 18 | 2 | 0 | 0 | 4 | 0 | 0 | 0 | 22 | 2 |
| Sepahan | 2014–15 | Persian Gulf Pro League | 19 | 0 | 0 | 0 | — | | 0 | 0 | 19 | 0 |
| Sepahan | 2015–16 | Persian Gulf Pro League | 28 | 2 | 4 | 1 | 6 | 0 | 0 | 0 | 38 | 3 |
| Sepahan | Total | | 65 | 4 | 4 | 1 | 11 | 0 | 0 | 0 | 80 | 5 |
| Dinamo Zagreb II | 2016–17 | Druga HNL | 9 | 0 | 0 | 0 | — | | 0 | 0 | 9 | 0 |
| Dinamo Zagreb | 2016–17 | Prva HNL | 1 | 0 | 2 | 0 | 0 | 0 | 0 | 0 | 3 | 0 |
| Lokomotiva (loan) | 2016–17 | Prva HNL | 8 | 1 | 0 | 0 | — | | 0 | 0 | 8 | 1 |
| Sepahan | 2017–18 | Persian Gulf Pro League | 20 | 1 | 0 | 0 | — | | 0 | 0 | 20 | 1 |
| Esteghlal | 2018–19 | Persian Gulf Pro League | 26 | 2 | 2 | 0 | 5 | 1 | 0 | 0 | 33 | 3 |
| Esteghlal | 2019–20 | Persian Gulf Pro League | 27 | 5 | 4 | 1 | 6 | 2 | 0 | 0 | 37 | 8 |
| Esteghlal | Total | | 53 | 7 | 6 | 1 | 11 | 3 | 0 | 0 | 70 | 11 |
| Qatar | 2020–21 | Qatar Stars League | 7 | 0 | 0 | 0 | 0 | 0 | 0 | 0 | 7 | 0 |
| Al-Duhail | 2020–21 | Qatar Stars League | 9 | 0 | 5 | 1 | 6 | 0 | 2 | 0 | 22 | 1 |
| Kayserispor | 2022–23 | Süper Lig | 20 | 2 | 4 | 0 | – | | – | | 24 | 2 |
| Kayserispor | 2023–2024 | Süper Lig | 27 | 3 | 1 | 0 | – | | – | | 28 | 3 |
| Kayserispor | 2024–25 | Süper Lig | 29 | 1 | 0 | 0 | – | | – | | 29 | 1 |
| Kayserispor | 2025–26 | Süper Lig | 2 | 0 | 0 | 0 | – | | – | | 2 | 0 |
| Kayserispor | Total | | 78 | 6 | 5 | 0 | 0 | 0 | 0 | 0 | 83 | 6 |
| Career total | | | 250 | 19 | 22 | 3 | 28 | 3 | 2 | 0 | 302 | 25 |

=== International ===
As of matches played 21 November 2023

Iran
| Year | Apps | Goals |
|---|---|---|
| 2016 | 1 | 0 |
| 2017 | 6 | 0 |
| 2018 | 3 | 0 |
| 2019 | 1 | 0 |
| 2020 | 2 | 0 |
| 2022 | 3 | 0 |
| 2023 | 3 | 0 |
| Total | 19 | 0 |

== Honours ==
Sepahan

- Hazfi Cup: 2012–13
- Persian Gulf Pro League: 2014–15

Iran U23

- WAFF U23 Championship: 2015
