= Rouhollah Bagheri =

Iranian forward

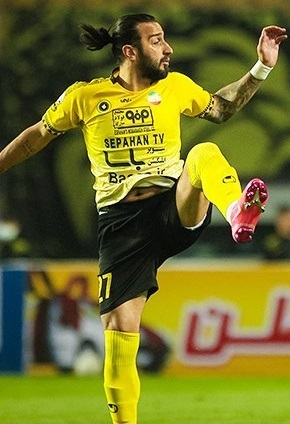
- Bagheri with Sepahan in 2021

Personal information
- Date of birth: 12 February 1991 (age 35)
- Place of birth: Rasht, Iran
- Height: 1.78 m (5 ft 10 in)
- Position: Forward

Youth career
- 2002–2009: Damash Gilan
- 2009–2010: Niroye Zamini

Senior career*
Years	Team	Apps	(Gls)
2010–2011	Niroye Zamini		
2011–2012	PAS Hamedan		
2012–2014	Siah Jamegan	20	(7)
2014	Padideh	10	(0)
2014–2015	Mes Kerman	13	(5)
2015–2018	Khooneh be Khooneh	85	(20)
2018–2019	Esteghlal	14	(1)
2019	Shahr Khodro	8	(1)
2020	Nassaji	13	(1)
2020–2021	Sepahan	9	(0)
2021-2022	Havadar S.C.	17	(0)
- * Club domestic league appearances and goals as of 19 March 2021

Rouhollah Bagheri (born 12 February 1991) is an Iranian footballer who played as a forward for Iranian football club Sepahan in the Persian Gulf Pro League.

== Career ==
=== Early years ===
Bagheri started his career with Mes Kerman at the youth level. As of summer 2012, he joined Etka Gorgan. He was a part of Etka Gorgan during a promotion to 2014–15 Azadegan League.

=== Esteghlal ===
On 4 June 2018, he joined Esteghlal on a two-year contract.

== Career statistics ==
As of 1 June 2018.

Club	Division	Season	League		Hazfi Cup		Asia		Total	
Club	Division	Season	Apps	Goals	Apps	Goals	Apps	Goals	Apps	Goals
Padideh	Iran Pro League	2014–15	10	0	0	0	–	–	10	0
Mes Kerman	Azadegan League	2014–15	5	1	0	0	–	–	5	1
Khooneh be Khooneh	Azadegan League	2015–16	28	0	0	0	–	–	28	0
Khooneh be Khooneh	Azadegan League	2016–17	25	8	1	2	–	–	26	10
Khooneh be Khooneh	Azadegan League	2017–18	32	12	4	4	–	–	36	16
Career Totals			100	21	5	6	0	0	105	27
