= Amirhossein =

Amirhossein, Amir Hossein or Amir-Hossein is an Iranian masculine given name. Notable people with the name include:

== Amirhossein ==
- Amirhossein Bagherpour (born 1997), Iranian footballer
- Amirhossein Bayat (born 1998), Iranian footballer
- Amirhossein Alipour Darbeid (born 2002), Iranian Paralympic athlete
- Amirhossein Esfandiar (born 1999), Iranian volleyball player
- Amirhossein Esmaeilzadeh (born 2000), Iranian footballer
- Amirhossein Hosseinzadeh (born 2000), Iranian footballer
- Amirhossein Jeddi (born 1998), Iranian footballer
- Amirhossein Kargar (born 1998), Iranian footballer
- Amirhossein Kermanshahi (born 1984), Iranian actor and model
- Amirhossein Maghsoudloo (born 1987), Iranian–Azerbaijani singer, rapper and songwriter
- Amirhossein Pourjafar (1999–2018), Iranian convicted murderer
- Amirhossein Pourmohammad (born 1998), Iranian footballer
- Amirhossein Reyvandi (born 2004), Iranian footballer
- Amirhossein Sahebkar, Iranian biotechnologist
- Amirhossein Yahyazadeh (born 1998), Iranian footballer

== Amir Hossein and Amir-Hossein ==
- Amir-Hossein Khozeimé Alam (c. 1919–2002), last ruling Amir of Qaenat and Sistan
- Amir Hossein Amiri (born 1994), Iranian footballer
- Amir Hossein Ardebili (born 1975), Iranian businessman
- Amir Hossein Arman (born 1982), Iranian actor and singer
- Amir-Hossein Aryanpour (1925–2001), Iranian academic
- Amir Hossein Aslanian (born 1979), Iranian footballer
- Amir Hossein Azmoudeh (1908–1998), Iranian military officer
- Amir Hossein Feshangchi (born 1987), Iranian footballer
- Amir Hossein Firouzpour, Iranian freestyle wrestler
- Amir-Hossein Ghazizadeh Hashemi (born 1971), Iranian politician
- Amir Hossein Jahanshahi (born 1960), Iranian politician
- Amir Hossein Karimi (born 1996), Iranian footballer
- Amir Hossein Khodamoradi (born 2000), Iranian footballer
- Amir Hossein Nemati (born 1996), Iranian footballer
- Amir Hossein Peiravani (born 1967), Iranian footballer and manager
- Amir Hossein Rabii (1930–1979), Iranian Air Force officer
- Amir Hossein Sadeghi (born 1981), Iranian footballer
- Amir Hossein Heshmat Saran (1960–2009, Iranian activist
- Amir Hossein Sedghi (born 1996), Iranian footballer
- Amir Hossein Tahuni (born 1992), Iranian footballer
- Amir Hossein Tatari (born 1988), Iranian basketball player
- Amir Hossein Toukhteh (born 2001), Iranian volleyball player
- Amir Hossein Yousefi (born 1977), Iranian footballer
- Amir Hossein Zare (born 2001), Iranian freestyle wrestler
- Amir Hossein Zekrgoo (born 1957), Iranian artist
