= Ashtiani =

Ashtiani (آشتیانی) may refer to:

== People ==
- Abbas Eqbal Ashtiani (1897–1956), twentieth-century Iranian literary scholar
- Ardalan Ashtiani (born 1982), Iranian football player, son of Ebrahim Ashtiani
- Ebrahim Ashtiani (1942–2017), Iranian football player
- Javad Ashtiani (born 1981), Iranian football player
- Mohammad-Reza Gharaei Ashtiani
- Sakineh Mohammadi Ashtiani (born 1967), Iranian woman released in 2014 after serving nine years on death row

== Other uses ==
- Ashtiani dialect, spoken around the city of Ashtian
