= Syed Muhammad Naquib al-Attas =

Malaysian philosopher (1931–2026)

Yang Berbahagia Royal Professor Tan Sri Dr. Syed Muhammad Naquib al-Attas PSM
- Al-Attas in his library
- Born: 5 September 1931; Buitenzorg, Buitenzorg Residency, Dutch East Indies (now Bogor, Indonesia)
- Died: 8 March 2026 (aged 94); Damansara Utama, Petaling Jaya, Selangor, Malaysia
- Resting place: Bukit Kiara Muslim Cemetery, Damansara, Kuala Lumpur
- Spouse: Latifah al-Attas
- Children: 4
- Awards: Iqbal Centenary Commemorative Medal (Pakistan)

Education
- Education: Royal Military Academy Sandhurst
- Alma mater: University of Malaya (BA); McGill University (MA); SOAS University of London (PhD)
- Thesis: The Mysticism of Hamzah Fansuri (two-volume doctoral thesis) (1962.)
- Academic advisors: Martin Lings; Arthur John Arberry

Philosophical work
- Era: Modern
- School: Islamic philosophy; Logic; Oriental
- Main interests: Sufism; cosmology; metaphysics; Malay language and literature
- Notable works: Islam and Secularism, Historical Fact and fiction, The Concept of Education in Islam: A Framework for an Islamic Philosophy of Education, Prolegomena to the Metaphysics of Islam, Islam: The Covenants Fulfilled
- Notable ideas: Islamisation of knowledge
- Syed Naquib al-Attas' voice Excerpt from a recording of Syed Naquib al-Attas's voice.

Syed Muhammad al Naquib bin Ali al-Attas (Arabic: سيد محمد نقيب العطاس Sayyid Muḥammad Naqīb al-ʿAṭṭās; 5 September 1931 – 8 March 2026) was a Malaysian Muslim philosopher of Arab descent. He was considered one of the few contemporary scholars who was thoroughly rooted in the traditional Islamic sciences and studied theology, philosophy, metaphysics, history, and literature. He pioneered the concept of Islamisation of knowledge. Al-Attas's philosophy and methodology of education have one goal: Islamisation of the mind, body, and soul and its effects on the personal and collective life of Muslims as well as others, including the spiritual and physical non-human environment. He was the second Malaysian to be awarded the title of Royal Professor (Profesor Diraja) after the late Ungku Abdul Aziz.

Al-Attas was the author of 27 works on various aspects of Islamic thought and civilisation, particularly on Sufism, cosmology, metaphysics, philosophy and Malay language, and literature.

== Early life and education ==
Syed Muhammad Naquib al-Attas was born in Bogor, Java, Dutch East Indies on 5 September 1931, into a family with a history of illustrious ancestors and saints. Al-Attas was born into a family of Hadrami Arab sayyid lineage that had long been established in the Malay world. Some sources state his genealogical tree can be traced over a thousand years through the Ba' Alawi sayyids of Hadramaut. He was the second of three sons; his elder brother, Syed Hussein Alatas later became an academician and politician. He was the cousin of the academic Ungku Abdul Aziz.

After World War II, in 1946 he returned to Johor to complete his secondary education. He was exposed to Malay literature, history, religion, and Western classics in English.

After al-Attas finished secondary school in 1951, he entered the Malay Regiment as a cadet officer. There he was selected to study at Eaton Hall, Chester, England and later at the Royal Military Academy, Sandhurst, UK (1952–1955). During this time he became interested in the metaphysics of the Sufis, especially the works of Jami. He travelled to Spain and North Africa where the Islamic heritage had a profound influence on him. Al-Attas felt the need to study and voluntarily resigned from the King's Commission to serve in the Royal Malay Regiment, to pursue studies at the University of Malaya in Singapore (1957–1959).

While an undergraduate at the University of Malaya, he wrote Rangkaian Ruba'iyat, a literary work, and Some Aspects of Sufism as Understood and Practised among the Malays. He was awarded the Canada Council Fellowship for three years of study at the Institute of Islamic Studies at McGill University in Montreal. He received an M.A. degree with distinction in Islamic philosophy in 1962, with his thesis Raniri and the Wujudiyyah of 17th Century Acheh. Al-Attas went on to the School of Oriental and African Studies, University of London where he worked with Professor A.J. Arberry of Cambridge and Martin Lings. His doctoral thesis (1962) was a two-volume work on the mysticism of Hamzah Fansuri.

In 1965, al-Attas returned to Malaysia and became Head of the Division of Literature in the Department of Malay Studies at the University of Malaya, Kuala Lumpur. He was Dean of the Faculty of Arts from 1968 until 1970, where he instituted more consultative reforms. Thereafter he moved to the new National University of Malaysia, as Head of the Department of Malay Language and Literature and then Dean of the Faculty of Arts. He advocated the use of Malay as the language of instruction in the university. He founded and directed the Institute of Malay Language, Literature, and Culture (IBKKM) at the National University of Malaysia in 1973.

In 1987, with al-Attas as founder and director, the International Institute of Islamic Thought and Civilisation (ISTAC) was established in Kuala Lumpur. The institution was made to increase the consciousness of Islam to its students and faculty. Al-Attas incorporated Islamic artistic and architectural principles throughout the campus and grounds.

== Malay literature and Sufism ==
Al-Attas authored Rangkaian Ruba'iyyat a literary work that was among the first ever published in 1959 and the classic work, Some Aspects of Sufism as Understood and Practised Among the Malays, in 1963. His two-volume doctoral thesis on The Mysticism of Hamzah Fansuri, which is the most important and comprehensive work to date on one of the greatest and perhaps the most controversial Sufi scholars in the Malay world earned him a PhD in the UK in 1965.

He engaged in polemics on the subjects of Islamic history, philology, Malay literary history and Sha'ir. He established that Hamzah Fansuri was the originator of the Malay Sha'ir. He has also set forth his ideas on the categorisation of Malay literature and the periodisation of its literary history. He contributed to the history and origin of the modern Malay language.

His commentaries on the ideas of Fansuri and al-Raniri are the first definitive ones on early Malay Sufis based on 16th- and 17th-century manuscripts. He discovered and published his meticulous research on the oldest extant Malay manuscript, wherein among other important matters, he also solved the issue of arrangements of the Malay-Islamic cyclical calendar. He was also responsible for the formulation and conceptualisation of the role of the Malay language in nation-building during debates with political leaders in 1968. This formulation and conceptualisation was one of the important factors that led to the consolidation of Malay as the national language of Malaysia. As the Dean of the Faculty of Arts, at the University of Malaya, he implemented a more systematic implementation of Malay as an intellectual and academic language in the university.

== Islam and metaphysics ==
Al-Attas maintained that modern science sees things as mere things and that it has reduced the study of the phenomenal world to an end in itself. Certainly, this has brought material benefits; however, it is accompanied by an uncontrollable and insatiable propensity to destroy nature itself. Al-Attas maintained a firm critique that studying and using nature without a higher spiritual end has brought mankind to the state of thinking that men are gods or co-partners. "Devoid of real purpose, the pursuit of knowledge becomes a deviation from the truth, which necessarily puts into question the validity of such knowledge." [Islam and Secularism, p. 36]

Al-Attas viewed Western civilisation as constantly changing and 'becoming' without ever achieving 'being'. He analysed that many institutions and nations are influenced by this spirit of the West and they continually revise and change their basic developmental goals and educational objectives to follow the trends from the West. He pointed to Islamic metaphysics which shows that Reality is composed of both permanence and change; the underlying permanent aspects of the external world are perpetually changing [Islam and Secularism, p. 82]

For al-Attas, Islamic metaphysics was a unified system that discloses the ultimate nature of Reality in positive terms, integrating reason and experience with other higher orders in the suprarational and trans-empirical levels of human consciousness. He saw this from the perspective of philosophical Sufism. Al-Attas also said that the Essentialist and the Existentialist schools of the Islamic tradition address the nature of reality. The former is represented by philosophers and theologians, and the latter by Sufis. The Essentialists cling to the principle of mahiyyah (quiddity), whereas the Existentialists are rooted in wujud (the fundamental reality of existence) which is direct intuitive experience, not merely based on rational analysis or discursive reasoning. This has undoubtedly led philosophical and scientific speculations to be preoccupied with things and their essences at the expense of existence itself, thereby making the study of nature an end in itself. Al-Attas maintained that in the extra-mental reality, it is wujud (Existence) that is the real "essences" of things and that what is conceptually posited as mahiyyah ("essences" or "quiddities") are in reality accidents of existence.

The process of creation or bringing into existence and annihilation or returning to non-existence, and recreation of similars is a dynamic existential movement. There is a principle of unity and a principle of diversity in creation. "The multiplicity of existents that results is not in the one reality of existence, but in the manifold aspects of the recipients of existence in the various degrees, each according to its strength or weakness, perfection or imperfection, and priority or posteriority. Thus the multiplicity of existents does not impair the unity of existence, for each existent is a mode of existence and does not have a separate ontological status". He clarified that the Essence of God is transcendent and is unknown and unknowable, except to Himself, whereas the essence or reality of a thing consists of a mode of existence providing the permanent aspect of the thing, and its quiddity, endowing it with its changing qualities.

== Death ==
Al-Attas died on 8 March 2026, at the age of 94. Funeral prayers for Al-Attas were held at Al-Taqwa Mosque in TTDI the following morning, with his burial taking place at the Bukit Kiara Muslim Cemetery.

== Awards and achievements ==
Al-Attas developed a style and precise vocabulary that uniquely characterised his Malay writings and language. He also studied Islamic and Malay civilisations. In 1975, he was conferred Fellow of the Imperial Iranian Academy of Philosophy for his contribution in the field of comparative philosophy. He was also a speaker and an active participant at the First World Conference on Islamic Education held at Mecca in 1977, where he chaired the Committee on Aims and Definitions of Islamic Education. From 1976 to 1977, he was a visiting professor of Islam at Temple University, Philadelphia, United States. In 1978, he chaired the UNESCO meeting of experts on Islamic history held at Aleppo, Syria.

He was the first holder of the Chair of Malay Language and Literature at the National University of Malaysia (1970–84), and the first holder of the Tun Abdul Razak Chair of Southeast Asian Studies at Ohio University (1980–82) and as the Founder-Director of the International Institute of Islamic Thought and Civilisation (ISTAC) at the International Islamic University Malaysia (since 1987). He delivered more than 400 lectures throughout Europe, the United States, Japan, the Far East and the Muslim world. Anwar Ibrahim in 1993, appointed him as the first holder of the Abu Hamid al-Ghazali Chair of Islamic Thought at ISTAC. King Hussein of Jordan made him a Member of the Royal Academy of Jordan in 1994, and in June 1995 the University of Khartoum conferred upon him the Degree of Honorary Doctorate of Arts (D.Litt.).

He was also a calligrapher. His work was exhibited at the Tropenmuseum in Amsterdam in 1954. He planned and designed the: ISTAC building; the unique scroll of the al-Ghazali Chair (1993); the auditorium and mosque of ISTAC (1994); as well as their landscaping and interior decor.

=== Honour of Malaysia ===
- Malaysia
  - Commander of the Order of Loyalty to the Crown of Malaysia (P.S.M.) (2011)
  - Royal Professor "Professor DiRaja" (2024)

== Ancestry ==
Syed Naquib was of mixed ancestry; His father, Syed Ali al-Attas, was the son of a Hadhrami Arab preacher and a Circassian noblewoman. On his mother's side, Syed Naquib was the son of a Hadhrami Arab and a Sundanese noblewoman.

Ancestors of Syed Muhammad Naquib al-Attas

Syed Muhsin al-Attas
Syed Abdullah al-Attas
Syed Ali al-Attas
Rugayyah Hanum
Syed Muhammad Naquib al-Attas
Sharifah Raquan al-Aydarus

== Bibliography ==
A list of works by Syed Muhammad Naquib Al-Attas is as follows. He authored more than two dozen books and monographs, and a lot of articles.

=== Books and monographs ===
- Rangkaian Ruba'iyat (in Malay). Kuala Lumpur: Dewan Bahasa dan Pustaka. 1959.
- Some Aspects of Sufism as Understood and Practised among the Malays. Singapore: Malaysian Sociological Research Institute. 1963.
- The Origin of The Malay Sha'ir. Kuala Lumpur: Dewan Bahasa dan Pustaka. 1968.
- Raniri and the Wujudiyyah of the 17th Century Acheh. Kuala Lumpur: Monographs of the Malaysian Branch of the Royal Asiatic Society. 1969.
- Preliminary Statement On A General Theory of The Islamization of The Malay-Indonesian Archipelago. Kuala Lumpur: Dewan Bahasa dan Pustaka. 1969.
- The Mysticism of Hamzah Fansuri. Kuala Lumpur: University of Malaya Press. 1970.
- The Correct Date of the Terengganu Inscription. Kuala Lumpur: Museum Department. 1970.
- Concluding Postscript to The Origin of The Malay Sha'ir. Kuala Lumpur: Dewan Bahasa dan Pustaka. 1971.
- Islam dalam Sejarah dan Kebudayaan Melayu. Kuala Lumpur: Universiti Kebangsaan Malaysia. 1972.
- Comments on the Re-Examination of Al-Raniri's Hujjatu'l Siddiq: A Refutation. Kuala Lumpur: Museum Department. 1975.
- Islām: Faham Agama dan Asas Akhlak. Kuala Lumpur: Angkatan Belia Islam Malaysia (ABIM). 1977.
- Islam and Secularism. Kuala Lumpur: Muslim Youth Movement of Malaysia (ABIM); reprint, Kuala Lumpur: International Institute of Islamic Thought and Civilisation (ISTAC), 1993. 1978.
- The Concept of Education in Islam. Kuala Lumpur: Muslim Youth Movement of Malaysia (ABIM); reprint, Kuala Lumpur: International Institute of Islamic Thought and Civilisation (ISTAC. 1980.
- A Commentary on the Hujjat al-Siddiq of Nur al-Din al-Raniri: Being an Exposition the Salient Points of Distinction between the Positions of the Theologians, the Philosophers, the Sufis and the Pseudo-Sufis on the Ontological Relationship between God and the World and Related Questions. Kuala Lumpur: Malaysian Ministry of Culture. 1986.
- The Oldest Known Malay Manuscript: A 16th Century Malay Translation of the 'Aqa'id of al-Nasafi. Kuala Lumpur: University of Malaya. 1988.
- Islam and the Philosophy of Science. Kuala Lumpur: International Institute of Islamic Thought and Civilisation (ISTAC). 1989. Translated into German by Christoph Marcinkowski as Islam und die Grundlagen von Wissenschaft, Kuala Lumpur: ISTAC, 2001
- The Nature of Man and the Psychology of the Human Soul. Kuala Lumpur: International Institute of Islamic Thought and Civilisation (ISTAC). 1990.
- On Quiddity and Essence. Kuala Lumpur: International Institute of Islamic Thought and Civilisation (ISTAC). 1990.
- The Intuition of Existence. Kuala Lumpur: International Institute of Islamic Thought and Civilisation (ISTAC). 1990.
- Islam: The Concept of Religion and the Foundation of Ethics and Morality. Kuala Lumpur: International Institute of Islamic Thought and Civilisation (ISTAC). 1992.
- The Meaning and Experience of Happiness in Islam. 1993. Translated into Malay by Muhammad Zainiy 'Uthman as Ma'na Kebahagiaan dan Pengalamannya dalam Islam, Kuala Lumpur: ISTAC; and into German by Christoph Marcinkowski as Die Bedeutung und das Erleben von Glückseligkeit im Islam, Kuala Lumpur: ISTAC, 1998
- The Degrees of Existence. 1994.
- Prolegomena to the Metaphysics of Islam: An Exposition of the Fundamental Elements of the Worldview of Islam. Kuala Lumpur: International Institute of Islamic Thought and Civilization (ISTAC). 1995.
- Risalah untuk Kaum Muslimin (in Malay). Kuala Lumpur: International Institute of Islamic Thought and Civilization (ISTAC). 2001.
- Tinjauan Ringkas Peri Ilmu dan Pandangan Alam (in Malay). Pulau Pinang, Malaysia: Universiti Sains Malaysia. 2007.
- Historical Fact and Fiction. Kuala Lumpur, Malaysia: UTM Press. 2011.
- On Justice and the Nature of Man. Kuala Lumpur, Malaysia: IBFIM. 2015.
- Islam: The Covenants Fulfilled. Kuala Lumpur, Malaysia: Ta'dib International. 2023.

== See also ==
- International Institute of Islamic Thought and Civilisation
- List of Islamic scholars
