= Ardebili =

Ardebili is an Iranian surname. Notable people with the surname include:

- Abdul-Karim Mousavi Ardebili (1926–2016), Iranian Grand Ayatollah
- Amir Hossein Ardebili (born 1975), Iranian businessman
- Hossein Kazempour Ardebili (1952–2020), Iranian politician
