= Abdelaziz Berghout =

Algerian academic and researcher

Datuk Abdelaziz Berghout
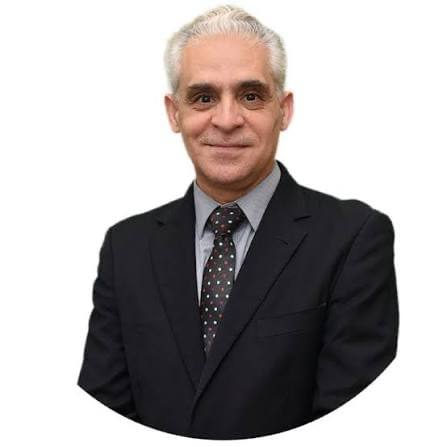
- Official portrait of Datuk Abdelaziz Berghout
- Born: Ras El Ayoun, Batna, Algeria
- Citizenship: Algerian
- Occupations: Academic, researcher, former university academic administrator
- Employer: International Islamic University Malaysia
- Known for: Islamic civilisation studies, civilisational renewal, higher education, integration of knowledge, values and sustainable development, worldview and philosophy
- Awards: Darjah Panglima Jasa Negara (P.J.N.)

Academic work
- Discipline: Islamic civilisation, Islamic thought, education
- Sub-discipline: Civilizational change theories, educational transformation, sustainability and values, integration of knowledge

Datuk Abdelaziz Berghout is an Algerian academic, researcher, and scholar in the fields of Islamic studies, Civilisation and Education. He is Professor of Islamic Thought and Civilisation at the International Islamic University Malaysia (IIUM), where he has held several senior academic and administrative positions, including Deputy Vice-Chancellor, Dean of Corporate Strategy and Quality Assurance and Dean of the International Institute of Islamic Thought and Civilisation (ISTAC-IIUM).

Berghout's academic work focuses on Islamic civilisation, Islamic thought, Islamic worldview, civilisational renewal, higher education, strategic planning, ethics, sustainable development, and the integration of revealed and acquired knowledge. He has authored and edited books, journal articles, book chapters, conference proceedings, and research papers in these fields.

Throughout his academic career, Berghout has contributed to educational reform, institutional transformation, international academic cooperation, and interdisciplinary research. He has represented IIUM, during his tenures, in numerous international conferences, academic forums, governmental meetings, and institutional collaborations across Asia, the Middle East, Europe, Africa, and other regions.

He has been also serving as an external expert on Cultural, Social, and Family Affairs for the Organisation of Islamic Cooperation (OIC), In this capacity, he participated in committees concerned with integrating ethics and values into policies for children, women and families, and with the development of strategic plans for marriage and family institutions in OIC member states.

In 2024, Berghout was conferred the Darjah Panglima Jasa Negara (P.J.N.) by the Yang di-Pertuan Agong of Malaysia, carrying the honorary title Datuk, in recognition of his contributions to society, higher education, academic leadership, and Islamic scholarship.

== Early life and education ==
Abdelaziz Berghout was born on 18 October 1966 in Ras El Ayoun, Batna, Algeria. He completed his Baccalaureate in Science at Abane Ramdane School in Algiers in 1986. He subsequently obtained a Higher Studies Degree in Finance in Algeria, 1991 before pursuing postgraduate studies in Islamic civilisation, civilisational studies, and education.

Berghout continued his postgraduate education in Malaysia, earning a Master's degree in Islamic Revealed Knowledge and Heritage from the International Islamic University Malaysia (IIUM) in 1995. In 1998-1999, he obtained a Doctor of Philosophy (PhD) in Islamic Civilization and History from the Academy of Islamic Studies, University of Malaya.

In 2000, he obtained a Diploma in Human Sciences from IIUM. He later earned a second Doctor of Philosophy (PhD), in Education, from the Faculty of Education at the International Islamic University Malaysia in 2021.

His academic background spans Islamic thought, Islamic civilisation, education, and the human and social sciences. His multidisciplinary education reflects his academic work in higher education, academic administration, Islamic philosophy, civilisational studies, and educational reform.

== Academic career ==
Berghout joined the International Islamic University Malaysia (IIUM) as a lecturer in 1995. During his academic career, he has served in various academic ranks, including Lecturer, Assistant Professor, Associate Professor, Professor, and Senior Professor. Over more than three decades, he has contributed to teaching, research, curriculum development, postgraduate supervision, community engagement, and academic administration.

Throughout his academic career, Berghout has taught undergraduate and postgraduate courses in Islamic studies, Islamic thought, philosophy, civilisation, education, research methodology, ethics, and the human sciences. His teaching has included courses on the Islamic worldview, Islamisation of knowledge, Islamic civilisation and history, Islamic revivalism, research methodology, Qur'anic studies, Islamic theology (ʿAqidah), Fiqh, Da'wah, Critical Study of Philosophy, creative thinking and problem solving and contemporary Islamic thought.

Berghout has supervised and examined master's and doctoral candidates from a range of academic disciplines and countries. He has also contributed to curriculum development, academic quality assurance, postgraduate education, and institutional strategic planning.

His research focuses on Islamic civilisation, civilisational transformation, philosophy, epistemology, Islamic worldview, higher education, strategic planning, futures studies, values-based education, sustainable development, and the integration of knowledge. His scholarly work has been published in books, edited volumes, book chapters, conference proceedings, and peer-reviewed academic journals.

In addition to his teaching and research, Berghout has participated in national and international conferences, research collaborations, and academic initiatives. He has delivered keynote addresses and invited lectures at universities and international scholarly forums.

== Administrative leadership ==
Throughout his academic career, Berghout has held academic and administrative leadership positions at the International Islamic University Malaysia (IIUM) and other academic and international organisations. His work has included academic governance, strategic planning, institutional development, quality assurance, research management, and higher education policy.

Between 2021 and 2025, Berghout served as Dean of the International Institute of Islamic Thought and Civilisation (ISTAC-IIUM), where he oversaw its academic and administrative affairs. During the same period, he also supervised the International Institute for Muslim Unity (IIMU-IIUM).

From 2011 to 2018, Berghout served as Deputy Vice-Chancellor for Internationalisation, Industry and Community Relations at the International Islamic University Malaysia (IIUM). His responsibilities included international relations, industry and community engagement, and cooperation with universities and international organisations.

During his tenure as Deputy Vice-Chancellor, IIUM maintained collaborations with organisations including the Islamic World Educational, Scientific and Cultural Organization (ISESCO), the Federation of the Universities of the Islamic World (FUIW), the League of Islamic Universities (LIU), the Association of Arab Universities (AAU), and other universities and institutions from the West and the East.

Between 2012 and 2017, Berghout served as Supervisor of the Islamic Agency for Quality and Accreditation, hosted at IIUM in collaboration with by the Islamic World Educational, Scientific and Cultural Organization (ISESCO) and the Federation of the Universities of the Islamic World (FUIW).

In addition to his university appointments, Berghout has served on advisory boards, governing bodies, academic committees, and international organisations.

=== Leadership positions ===
| Position | Institution | Period |
|---|---|---|
| Dean, International Institute of Islamic Thought and Civilisation (ISTAC) | International Islamic University Malaysia | 2021–2025 |
| Deputy Vice-Chancellor for Internationalisation, Industry and Community Relations | International Islamic University Malaysia | 2011–2018 |
| Supervisor, International Institute for Muslim Unity (IIMU) | International Islamic University Malaysia | 2011–2018; 2021–2025 |
| Company Director, IIUM International Sdn. Bhd. | International Islamic University Malaysia | 2012–2014 |
| Head, Centre for Co-curricular Activities | International Islamic University Malaysia | 2004–2008 |
| Director, Higher Education Company Sdn. Bhd. | IIUM International Islamic College | 2014–2015 |
| Dean of Corporate Strategy and Quality Assurance | International Islamic University Malaysia | 2009–2011 |
| Sheikh, International Institute of Islamic Thought and Civilisation (ISTAC) | International Islamic University Malaysia | 2017–2018 |
| Chairman of the Board of Trustees | APEXSCI International University | 2024–present |
| External Advisor on Cultural, Social and Family Affairs | Organisation of Islamic Cooperation | 2020–present |
| Deputy President | African-Asian Union of Universities | 2019–2022 |

== Research interests and contributions ==
Berghout has authored 15 books and published more than 100 academic articles in peer-reviewed journals. His research focuses on Islamic civilisation, Islamic thought, philosophy, education, and sustainable development.

Berghout's research has addressed the application of Islamic principles to higher education, strategic management, curriculum development, and sustainable development. His research examines Islamic intellectual traditions in relation to education, leadership, governance, and civilisational development. He has developed the Tawhid–Istikhlaf–Umran Paradigm of Knowledge and Civilisation.

His recent edited publications include SDG 18: Spirituality, Values and Culture for Humanising Sustainable Development: A Future Worldview (2023) (eds), Islamic Finance and Sustainable Development: Balancing Spirituality, Values and Profit (2025) (eds), Discourses for a Peaceful Future: Daisaku Ikeda's Four Decades of Proposals for Civilisational Transformation (2026), Wise-Rationalized Communication and the Culture of Verification in the Digital Age (2026) (eds), and Islamic Worldview, Tawhidic Epistemology and Civilisation: Addressing Humanity's Predicaments (2026).

His research has been presented at international conferences and published in peer-reviewed journals, edited volumes, book chapters, and conference proceedings. He has also presented over 150 papers in local and international conferences

== Publications ==
Berghout's publications focus on Islamic civilisation, Islamic thought, Islamic worldview, philosophy, higher education, strategic planning, ethics, sustainable development, and educational reform. His works include books, edited volumes, book chapters, peer-reviewed journal articles, conference papers, and research reports.

A bibliography of his publications is available through the International Islamic University Malaysia Institutional Repository (IRep).

=== Books ===
| Year | Title | Publisher |
|---|---|---|
| 1995 | Prophetic Methodology and Civilisational Change | Ummah Book Series, Qatar |
| 2005 | Methods of Preaching in a Multi-Religious and Multi-Cultural Society | Research Centre, IIUM |
| 2005 | Foundations of Civilizational Renewal and its Universal Dimensions: A Study on Malik Bennabi's Thought | Research Centre, IIUM |
| 2006 | The Islamic Worldview and Tajdid: A Civilizational Approach | Research Centre, IIUM |
| 2006 | Towards an Islamic Theory for Civilizational Development: The Contribution of Said Nursi | Research Centre, IIUM |
| 2007 | Materialization of the Civilizational Project of Islam in the Contemporary World | Ministry of Religious Affairs, Kuwait |
| 2009 | Introduction to The Islamic Worldview: Study of Selected Essentials (editor) | Research Centre, IIUM |
| 2023 | SDG 18: Spirituality, Values and Culture for Humanising Sustainable Development: A Future Worldview (co-editor) | ISTAC-IIUM Publications |
| 2026 | Discourses for a Peaceful Future: Daisaku Ikeda's Four Decades of Proposals for Civilisational Transformation | Azzahra Associates |
| 2026 | Wise-Rationalized Communication and the Culture of Verification in the Digital Age | Mashreq International Books |

=== Selected journal articles ===
- "Faith and the Essence of Human Being: Exploring the Islamic Concept of 'Honored Vicegerent'" (The Journal of Oriental Studies, 2026)
- "Islamic Worldview and Civilisational Tawhidic Epistemology: Towards a Universal Narrative" (2026)
- "Mechanisms of Philosophical Reasoning and their Importance in Achieving Quality of Life" (2025)
- "AbdulHamid AbuSulayman: Civilizational Education for Transformation" (Journal of Education in Muslim Societies, 2022)
- "Role of Worldview in Family Empowerment Plans: Proposed Islamic Integrated Framework" (Journal of Islam in Asia, 2022)
- "Towards an Integrated Model of University Performance Measurement in the Islamic World" (2017)
- "Valorizing Time as a Civilisational Asset: Glimpses into the Views of Malik Bennabi and Said Nursi" (2016)
- "The Islamic View of Technology: Re-discovering the Patterns of Balance and Order" (2010)

=== Selected book chapters ===
- "Islamic Worldview and Civilisational Tawhidic Epistemology: Towards a Universal Narrative" (2026)
- "Strategising the Process of Islamisation of Knowledge in a University Context" (2026)
- "Said Nursi's Vision for a New Universal Culture of Dialogue" (2008)
- "Internationalisation and Global Prominence through Educational Excellence" (2023)
- "SDG 18: Spirituality, Values, Culture and Social Action for Sustainable Development" (2023)

== Awards and honours ==
Berghout has received several national and academic honours.

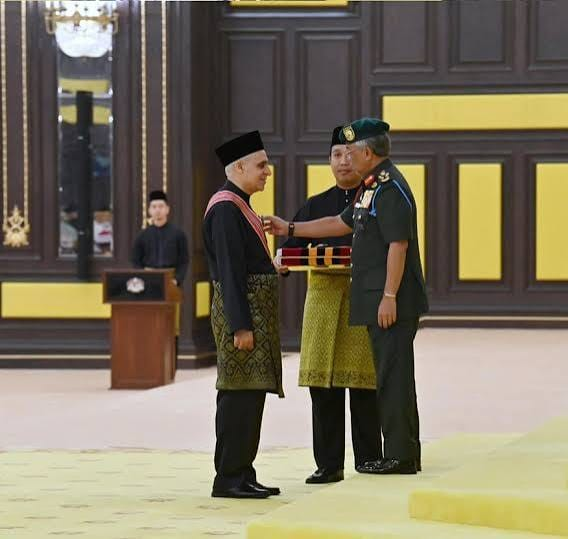
Berghout receiving the Darjah Panglima Jasa Negara (P.J.N.), which carries the honorary title Datuk, from the Yang di-Pertuan Agong of Malaysia (23rd Jan 2024).

In 2024, he was conferred the Darjah Panglima Jasa Negara (P.J.N.) by the Yang di-Pertuan Agong, which carries the honorary title Datuk.

| Year | Award or honour | Awarding institution |
|---|---|---|
| 2025 | Outstanding Leadership Award (Takreem Day) | International Institute of Islamic Thought and Civilisation (ISTAC-IIUM), Malaysia |
| 2024 | Darjah Panglima Jasa Negara (P.J.N.) – Honorary title: Datuk | Yang di-Pertuan Agong, Malaysia |
| 2024 | Special Recognition Award – Insan Sejahtera Through Spirituality & Values-Driven Education (Takreem Day) | International Islamic University Malaysia |
| 2022 | Global Relevance and Citizenship Award | International Islamic University Malaysia |
| 2019 | The Jewels of the Muslim World | OIC Today, Malaysia |
| 2015 | Vicennium Appreciation Award | Ma'din Academy, India |
| 2015 | Award for Dedicated Leadership and Services (Maulidur Rasul Award) | International Islamic University Malaysia |
| 2011 | Ajman Award for Quality and Excellence | Government of Ajman, United Arab Emirates |
| 2007 | Outstanding Researcher Award | International Islamic University Malaysia |

== International activities and professional services ==
Berghout has been serving as an External Expert on Cultural, Social and Family Affairs for the Organisation of Islamic Cooperation (OIC). In this capacity, he coordinated the OIC Committee for the Development of a Guiding Document on the Integration of Ethics and Values into Children, Women and Family Policies for OIC Member States (2023), and the Committee for Formulating a Strategic Plan for the Empowerment of Marriage and Family Institutions (2018–2019).

Berghout serves as Chairman of the Board of Trustees of APEXSCI International University.

As Deputy Vice-Chancellor for Internationalisation, Industry and Community Relations at the International Islamic University Malaysia (2011–2018), Berghout represented the university at international conferences, academic forums, institutional partnerships, and higher education initiatives.

Berghout has collaborated with universities, governmental agencies, international organisations, and research institutions on academic and educational initiatives.

=== Selected international conferences ===
| Year | Event | Location | Participation |
|---|---|---|---|
| 2026 | ASEAMYS Summit | Australia | Invited speaker |
| 2025 | Riyadh International Philosophy Conference | Saudi Arabia | Invited speaker |
| 2025 | International Zakat Conference (INZAC) | Maldives | Keynote speaker |
| 2025 | 39th IOP Annual Conference | Japan | Presenter |
| 2025 | 7th Iqbal Conference | Pakistan | Keynote speaker |
| 2025 | MAFIS Conference | Indonesia | Keynote speaker |
| 2025 | IQRA' Global Conference | United States | Keynote speaker |
| 2024 | Riyadh International Philosophy Conference | Saudi Arabia | Invited speaker |
| 2024 | International Conference on Enhancing ArtScience | Malaysia | Keynote speaker |
| 2024 | ICILAC | Indonesia | Keynote speaker |
| 2023 | International Conference on AbdulHamid AbuSulayman | Malaysia | Presenter |
| 2023 | ULMA Conference | Indonesia | Invited speaker |
| 2023 | International Conference on Teaching Islamic Studies | Morocco | Invited speaker |
| 2023 | University of Muhammadiyah | Indonesia | Invited speaker |
| 2021 | International Conference on the Islamisation of Knowledge | Indonesia | Presenter |
| 2020 | International Seminar on Islamic Learning | Ukraine | Keynote speaker |
| 2017 | World Moderation Forum | Jordan | Presenter |
| 2016 | G20 Interfaith Conference | India | Presenter |
| 2015 | International Symposium on Time in Islamic Civilisation | Turkey | Presenter |
| 2013 | International Conference on Religious Studies and Global Peace | Turkey | Presenter |
| 2012 | State and Religion Conference | Azerbaijan | Presenter |
| 2010 | QS Asia Pacific Professional Leaders in Education Conference | Singapore | Presenter |
| 2009 | International Conference on Higher Education in Peace and Development | Philippines | Presenter |

=== International committees and advisory roles ===
Berghout has served on international committees, advisory boards, editorial boards, and quality assurance bodies, including appointments with the Organisation of Islamic Cooperation (OIC), ISESCO, the Federation of the Universities of the Islamic World (FUIW), universities, and academic journals.

=== International collaboration ===
During his tenure as Deputy Vice-Chancellor of IIUM (2011–2018) and Dean of ISTAC-IIUM (2021–2025), Berghout was involved in developing memoranda of understanding (MoUs) and memoranda of agreement (MoAs) with universities, governmental agencies, and international organisations.
