= Amir Hossein Zekrgoo =

Iranian artist (born 1957)

- Born: 1957 (age 68–69); Tehran, Iran
- Occupations: Indologist, art historian, artist

Philosophical work
- Region: Indian mythology and iconography
- Main interests: Aesthetics, mysticism

Amir Hossein Zekrgoo (born 1957 in Tehran) is an Iranian artist, art historian and Indologist. He has been professor of Islamic and Oriental arts at the International Institute of Islamic Thought and Civilization (ISTAC) from 2001 to 2016. He was awarded Ikuo Hirayama Silk Roads Fellowship by UNESCO.

Zekrgoo is an art historian of Islamic and Oriental arts, researcher of Persian mystical art and literature, and a scholar of comparative religion. He has studied fine arts in the University of Kansas, Indian art in the University of Delhi, and Islamic manuscript and monumental inscriptions at the National Museum Institute of Art History, Conservation and Museology. Besides English, he has studied Classical Persian, Arabic, Turkic, Urdu, Hindi, Sanskrit and Malay languages.

Zekrgoo is an associate member of the Iranian Academy of the Arts and of the Academy of Sciences of Iran, member of the Islamic Manuscript Association (TIMA) and honorary member of All India Fine Arts and Crafts Society(IFACS).

== Awards and honours ==
- 2016: Fellowship Award, by the Center for the Study of Manuscript Culture of Hamburg University (CSMC) (August –September 2016) to provide consultation on manuscript studies strategies and to undertake Study of Persian and Indian Illustrated Manuscripts Preserved in the Collection of the Hamburg University
- 2013: MacGeorge Fellowship Award, by University of Melbourne (June –Aug 2013) to undertake an assessment (codicological, contextual and aesthetic) of the Middle Eastern Manuscripts preserved in the collection of the Melbourne University library. Research on Codicological and Artistic Aspects of the Middle Eastern Manuscripts in the Melbourne University Collection
- 1995-96: Fellowship Award by “UNESCO Hirayama Silk Roads Project” to undertake a research project entitled: “The evolution of Islamic Scripts along the Silk Roads” sanctioned by UNESCO to undertake a field survey of the subject along a major part of the Silk Roads in Iran, India, Pakistan and China
- 2015: Award & Recognition for publishing 2 books with reputable publishers in 2015, Deputy Rector (Research & Innovation), International Islamic University Malaysia (IIUM), Dec 18, 2015
- 2012: Bronze Medal Award for research entitled “Passage Through Time, Nature & Faith: NOURUZ and the Process of Islamization” presented at IIUM Research, Invention & Innovation Exhibition (IRIIE 2012) in February 2012 at International Islamic University Malaysia Cultural Activity Center (CAC)
- 2011: Bronze Medal Award for research entitled “Conservational Guidelines for the Restoration of 17th Century a Historical Illustrated Manuscript of Shahnameh” presented at IIUM Research, Invention & Innovation Exhibition (IRIIE 2011) On 9–10 February 2011 at International Islamic University Malaysia Cultural Activity Center (CAC)
- 2009: National Award of the ‘Praised Book of the Year’ by Iranian Ministry of Culture for translation and commentary of Ananda K. Coomaraswamy's: Christian and Oriental Philosophy of Art
- 2008: National Award of the ‘Selected Book of the Season’ by Iranian Ministry of Culture for my translation and commentary of Ananda K. Coomaraswamy's: Christian and Oriental Philosophy of Art

== Books and book chapters ==
- Tracing Persian Sufi Literature in Hamzah Fansuri’s Writings. Joint effort with Leyla H. Tajer, Publisher: The Other Press Sdn. Bhd. Kuala Lumpur, 2023, ISBN 978-967-0957-50-0
- “Nature as Beloved and Mentor: The Symbolic Representation of Nature in Persian Poetry," Joint effort with Leyla H. Tajer, in Loving the Planet: Interfaith Essays on Ecology, Love, and Theology, Edited by Paul S. Fiddes, Firedent Publishing, Oxford, 2022, pp. 91–118, ISBN 978-1-9999-407-4-4
- ‘Trans-Nationalism and Civilizational Identity: Rumi on Land, Language and Love’, Al-Shajarah, Journal of the International Institute of Islamic Thought and Civilization (ISTAC), 2023, 21, Number 1, IIUM Press, pp. 73–96. https://journals.iium.edu.my/shajarah/index.php/shaj/article/view/1502.ISSN: 1394-6870
- ‘Devotional Poetry, Exceptional Calligraphy, Charming Manuscript: Expression of Religious Emotion in Ḥassan Kāshī’s Haft-Band, Al-Shajarah: Journal of the International Institute of Islamic Thought and Civilization (ISTAC), 2022, 27, Number 2, IIUM Press, pp. 371-95. https://journals.iium.edu.my/shajarah/index.php/shaj/article/view/1502.ISSN: 1394-6870
- ‘An Introduction to Persian Seals:Special Reference to Devotional Seals from an Eighteenth-Century Manuscript,’ Al-Shajarah, ISTAC Journal of Islamic Thought & Civilization, International Islamic University Malaysia (IIUM), 2022, Volume 27, Number 1, IIUM Press, pp. 153-170, ISSN: 1394-6870
- 'Who is the Bearded Man and the Young Boy Standing Next to Him? Fresh Findings from an Illustrated Manuscript of Nāmī’s Leylā va Majnūn & Khosrow va Shīrīn, Al-Shajarah, Journal of the International Institute of Islamic Thought & Civilization (ISTAC), 2020, Volume 25, Number 2, IIUM Press, pp. 335-359. ISSN: 1394-6870
- 'Treasures of Sciences in the Lovely Realm of Sights': An Investigation into Āmulī's Manuscript of Nafāis al-Funῡn fī 'Arā'is al-'Uyῡn, Al-Shajarah, Journal of the International Institute of Islamic Thought & Civilization (ISTAC), International Islamic University Malaysia (IIUM), 2020 Volume 25, Number 1, IIUM Press, pp. 163-189. ISSN: 1394-6870
- Three Treatises: Asrar al-Arifin, Sharab al-Ashiqin, Al-Muntahi By Hamza Fansuri (16 Century Malay Mystic). Joint effort with Leyla H. Tajer: Translation into Persian, Miras-e Maktoob, Tehran 2018 ISBN 978-600-203-154-9
- “Turquoise: The Colour of Victory” (Introduction to the Volume) 25 Centuries of Persian Architecture, Exhibition Catalogue NO. 3, Faam Gallery, London, November 2017 ISBN 978-0-9956659-3-4
- I Have Seen the Paradise: Reflections on the Philosophy of Western, Eastern & Islamic Arts, Naghd-e Farhang, November 2016 ISBN 978-600-8405-32-0
- Symbolism in Oriental Arts: Vol.5: Gestures & Postures in Buddhist & Hindu Arts MATN Publishing, Iran Academy of Art, Tehran, 2017 ISBN 978-964-232-251-0
- “Openings that Revolutionize Perception” (Introduction to the Volume) 25 Centuries of Persian Architecture, Exhibition Catalogue NO. 2, Publisher: Faam Gallery, London, November 2016 ISBN 978-0-9956659-0-3
- “Persia’s Architectural Identity” (Introduction to the Volume) 25 Centuries of Persian Architecture, Exhibition Catalogue NO. 1, Faam Gallery, London, February 2016
- Indian Mythology and Art MATN Publishing, Iran Academy of Art, Tehran, 2016 ISBN 978-964-232-174-2
- Symbolism in Oriental Arts: Vol.4: Water Deities & Mythical Sea Creatures MATN Publishing, Iran Academy of Art, Tehran, 2015-16 ISBN 978-964-232-217-6
- Symbolism in Oriental Arts: Vol.3: Mythical Birds in Buddhist & Hindu Arts MATN Publishing, Iran Academy of Art, Tehran, 2014-15 ISBN 978-964-232-195-7
- Symbolism in Oriental Arts: Vol.2: Snake in Buddhist & Hindu Iconography MATN Publishing, Iran Academy of Art, Tehran, 2012 ISBN 978-964-232-165-0
- “Reflections on Indo-Iranian Relations” in Anwar Alam (ed.) India and Iran – An Assessment of Contemporary Relations (pp. 308–322) New Century Publications, New Delhi, July 2011 ISBN 978-81-7708-276-0
- Traditional Foundations of Art & Life: Reflections on Ananda Coomaraswamy’s Dance of Shiva Publisher: MATN Publishing, Iran Academy of Art, Tehran, 2011 ISBN 978-964-232-092-9
- Christian and Oriental Philosophy of Art (Translation and Commentary) 2nd Edition Published by: The Iran Academy of Art, Tehran, 2010 ISBN 978-964-8802-88-7
- Al-Shajarah Special Issue on Mystical Aspects of Islamic Art & Literature (Editor) Published: International Institute of Islamic Thought and Civilization (ISTAC), International Islamic University Malaysia (IIUM), November, 2010
- Symbolism in Oriental Arts: Vol.1 Elephant in Hindu & Buddhist Iconography Publisher: MATN Publishing, Iran Academy of Art, Tehran, 2010 ISBN 978-964-232-040-0
- "Trans-Cultural Nature of Islamic Art" (Chapter in Book) – pp. 277–306 Islam Hadhari, ed. Mohamed Ajmal b. Abdu Razak Al-Aidrus, Published by: International Institute of Islamic Thought and Civilization (ISTAC), International Islamic University Malaysia, 2009. ISBN 978-983-9379-50-1
- “Illustrated Safavid Shahnameh in the Manuscript Collection of the International Institute of Islamic Thought & Civilization (ISTAC), IIUM”, Chapter in a book entitled Congress of Isfahan School, volume I: The Collective Essays on Painting Published by: The Iran Academy of Art, Tehran, 2008 ISBN 978-964-2986-19-4
- Christian and Oriental Philosophy of Art (Translation and Commentary) Published by: The Iran Academy of Art, Tehran, 2007
- "Postgraduate Studies in Art: An Interdisciplinary Approach" Chapter in a book entitled Postgraduate Education: Trends and Future Directions Institute of Postgraduate Studies, University of Malaya, KL, Malaysia 2006 Editors: Norhanon Abdul Wahab, Shaliza Ibrahim, Aziza Hamza, Md Yusoff Musa
- "Why Exhibit Works of Art?" Chapter in a book entitled New Gathering and Old Wine: Selected Essays on Philosophia Perenis (Jam’e noe va Mey-e Kohbeh: Majmoo’e Maqalat-e Ashab-e Hekmat-e Khaledeh). Published by: The Institute of Research and development of Human Sciences, Tehran, 2005 (1384), pp. 309–343
- "Christian and Oriental, or True Philosophy of Art" Chapter in a book entitled New Gathering and Old Wine: Selected Essays on Philosophia Perenis (Jam’e noe va Mey-e Kohbeh: Majmoo’e Maqalat-e Ashab-e Hekmat-e Khaledeh). The Institute of Research and development of Human Sciences, Tehran, 2005 (1384), pp. 343–369
- "That Beauty is a State": Chapter in a book entitled New Gathering and Old Wine: Selected Essays on Philosophia Perenis (Jam’e noe va Mey-e Kohbeh: Majmoo’e Maqalat-e Ashab-e Hekmat-e Khaledeh). The Institute of Research and development of Human Sciences, Tehran, 2005 (1384), pp. 417–439
- Introduction to Indian Art (Translation and Commentary) Iran Academy of Art and Rowzaneh Publishing, Tehran, 2003
- Water: The First Element (84 pgs) National Art Gallery, Kuala Lumpur, 2003 Author of the main body of the text comprising six chapters as follows:
  - Waters of Life
  - Waters of Purification
  - Waters of Emotion
  - Waters of Transformation
  - Water and Woman
  - Waters of Destruction
- "Silk Roads’ Spiritual Identity: A Historical Overview of Buddhism and Islam", in The Silk Roads, Highways of Culture and Commerce UNESCO Publishing, New York / Oxford, 2000
- The Sacred Art of Marriage – Persian Marriage Certificates of the Qajar Dynasty Islamic Arts Museum Malaysia, 2000.
- The Evolution of Art through History, Volume I – Art of the Ancient Civilizations (155 pgs) Ministry of Education, Tehran, 1999.
- The Evolution of Art through History, Volume II – Art of the Middle Ages to the Modern Era (230 pgs) Ministry of Education, Tehran, 1998.
- Noor-AlQuran (The Light of the Quran) - Co-Author Islamic Arts Museum Malaysia, 1999
- Secrecy of Indian Myths – Vedic Gods Publisher: Fekr-Rooz Publishing, Tehran, 1998
- The Shah Jahan Nama of Inayat Khan: An Abridged History of the Mughal Emperor Shah Jahan (Translated to English) (Member of Translation Board). Published by: Oxford University Press ISBN 978-0-19-562489-2
- “Nature, Man and Art: An Irano-Islamic Perspective,” in Indo-Iranian Cultural Relations, World Heritage Culture House of the I. R. Iran, New Delhi, 1994
