= Mashhad University of Medical Sciences =

Medical school in Mashhad, Iran

- دانشگاه علوم پزشکی مشهد; Danushgah-e 'lum-e Pezeshki-ye Mishhed
- Motto: Worship of GOD through service to man
- Type: Public
- Established: 1949
- President: Dr. Mahmoud Mohammadzadeh Shabestari
- Students: 9,000
- Location: Mashhad, Razavi Khorasan province, Iran
- Campus: Urban
- Website: www.mums.ac.ir/

Mashhad University of Medical Sciences (MUMS) is a medical school in Iran. Located in Razavi Khorasan province in the city of Mashhad, it was established in 1949 with Ferdowsi University of Mashad and separated in 1986 from its parent institution by national legislation.

MUMS has 8 faculties and operates 32 hospitals plus 179 rural and 147 urban healthcare centers. Its faculties include 600 teaching staff, 1700 physicians, 140 dentists, 130 pharmacists, and 25,402 staff employees. As of 2023, its enrollment range is 9,000-9,999.

== History ==
Mashhad School of Medicine was founded in 1941 with the sole mission of educating students and dispatching them to rural areas where access to medical care was desperately needed.

In 1965, Badri Teymourtash and Esmael Sondoozi founded the university's School of Dentistry.

In 1989, the faculties offering Medical Sciences' degrees across the country separated from the Ministry of Culture and Higher Education. New emerging medical universities have gone under the management of the Ministry of Health, Treatment and Medical Education. Thus the original University of Mashhad was divided into two independent universities: Ferdowsi University of Mashhad and Mashhad University of Medical Sciences.

Mashhad University of Medical Sciences now operates with 8 faculties, 32 hospitals, 179 rural and 147 urban health centers. With 597 teaching staff, 1645 MDs with different specialties, 138 dentists, 123 pharmacists, and 25, 402 employees, the university provides health care and medical services to the area's population.

== Overview ==
Mashhad University of Medical Sciences is mainly responsible for the health of the Khorasan community.

== Schools & faculties ==
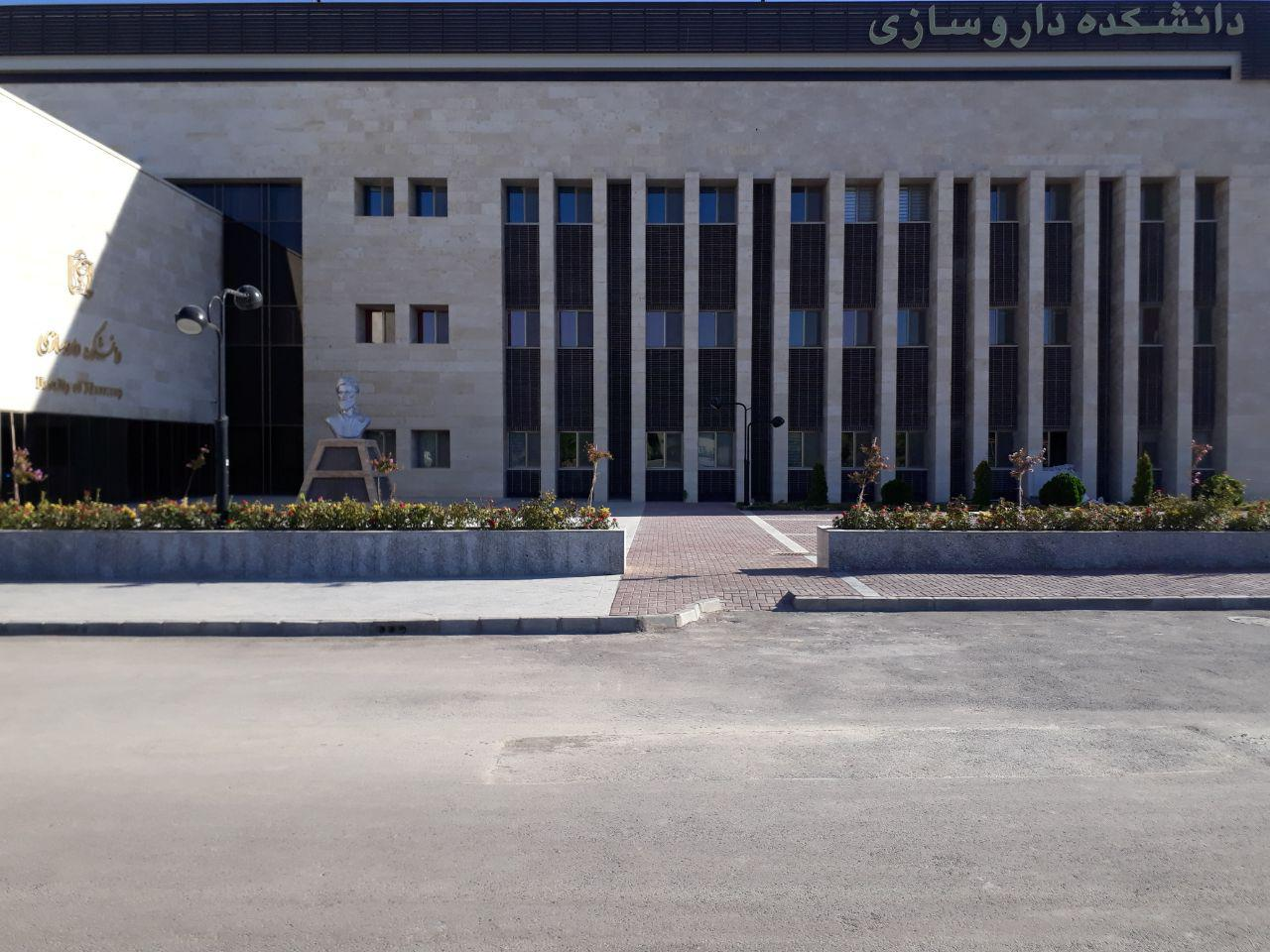
School of Pharmacy

- School of Medicine
- School of Dentistry
- School of Public Health
- School of Nursery and Midwifery
- School of Nursery and Midwifery
- School of Paramedical
- School of Traditional Medicine
- School of Pharmacy
- School of Veterinary Medicine

== Hospitals ==
- Dr Sheikh Pediatric Hospital
- Ebn-e-Sina Psychiatry Hospital
- Dr Shariati Hospital
- Emam Reza Hospital
- Ghaem Hospital
- Hashemi Nezhad Hospital
- Khatam-al-Anbia Ophthalmology Hospital
- Montaserieh Transplant Center
- Ommul Banin Women Hospital
- Omid Cancer Center
- Shahid Kamyab Trauma Hospital
- Taleghani Trauma Hospital

== Research centers ==
- Allergy
- Buali Research Institute
- Biotechnology Center
- Cancer Research Center
- Cardiovascular
- Dental Research Center
- Dental Material Center
- Endocrinology and Metabolism
- Endoscopic Surgery
- ENT Research Center
- Eye Research Center
- Immunology
- Lung Research Center
- Medical Physics
- Medical Toxicology
- Microbiology and Virology
- M.R.C.C. for Infertility
- Nano Medicine
- Neonatal Research Center
- Neuroscience Research Center
- Nuclear Medicine
- Oral & Maxillofacial diseases
- Orthopedic
- Patient Safety & Health Quality
- Pharmaceutical
- Pharmacological of M.P.
- Psychiatry and Behavioral R.C.
- Skin Disease
- Surgical Oncology Center
- Targeted Drug Delivery
- Vascular and Endovascular
- Women's Health

== Rankings ==
As of 2024, it was ranked 878th internationally and 3rd nationally.

== Notable faculty ==
- Amirhossein Sahebkar

== See also ==
- Higher Education in Iran
