= Saipa F.C. =

Iranian football club

Saipa سايپا
- Full name: Saipa Football Club
- Nicknames: Carmakers; The Foxes; Oranges
- Founded: 1 February 1989; 37 years ago
- Ground: Shahid Dastgerdi Stadium
- Capacity: 8,250
- Owner: SAIPA
- Chairman: Ahmad Madadi
- Manager: Mohammad Hassan Rajabzadeh
- League: Azadegan League
- 2024-25: Azadegan League, 3rd
- Website: www.saipasport.com
Home colours	Away colours	Third colours

Saipa Football Club (Persian: باشگاه فوتبال سايپا, Bashgah-e Futbal-e Saipa) is a football club from Tehran, Iran. The team is owned by SAIPA, an Iranian automobile manufacturer. The team has never had a large fanbase. In the 2006–07 season, under the guidance of Ali Daei, Saipa won their only Persian Gulf Cup title. Saipa has also won the Azadegan League twice and the Hazfi Cup once. Saipa is the football club of the multisport Saipa Cultural and Athletic Corporation.

== History ==
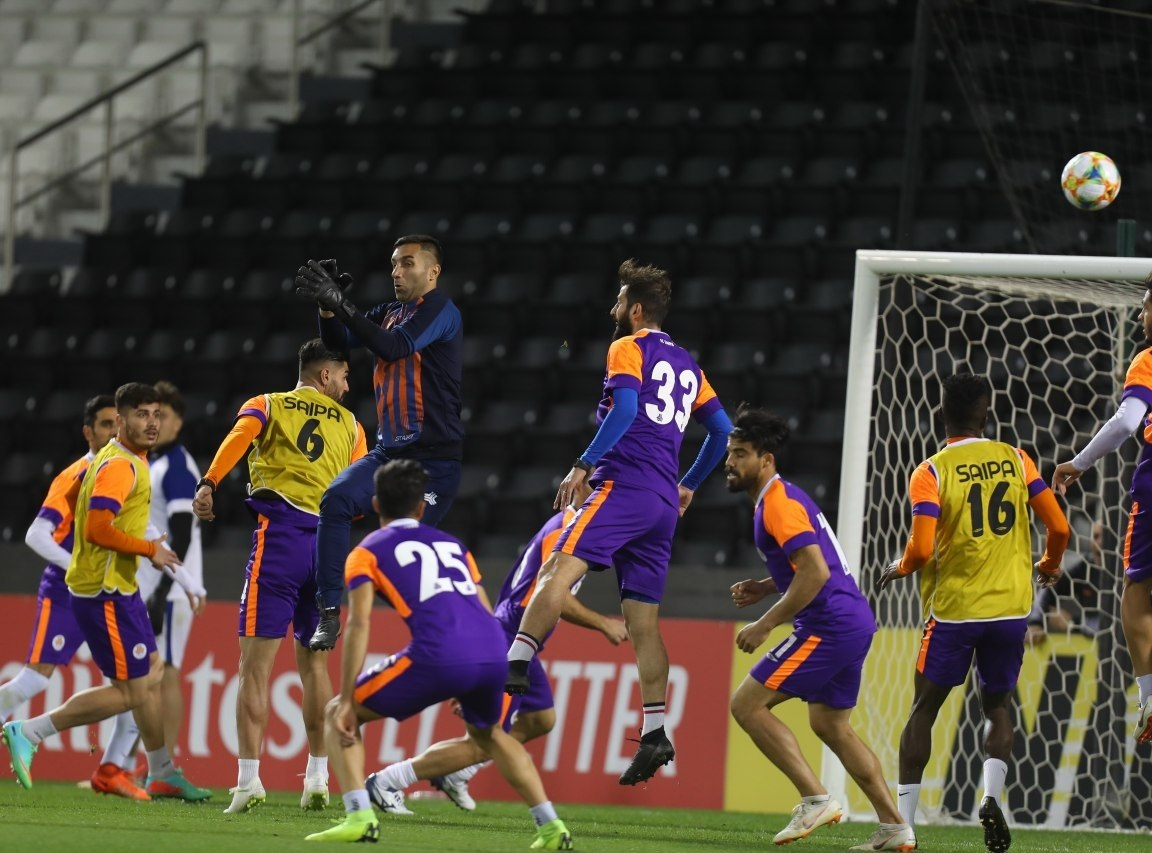
Team training in February 2019

=== Early days ===
In 1989, SAIPA Company decided to start its own football team. They purchased a team playing in the 4th division of Tehran's city league, and renamed it Saipa F.C. After back to back promotions starting in the first year, the Karaj-based club was playing in the 2nd division by 1991. That same year they purchased the Shipping Department team's shares, and participated in the 1st division of Tehran's local league. In that year they won the Tehran city championship as well as the Tehran Super Cup, thus attaining the right to play in Iran's top league at the time, the Azadegan League.

=== Azadegan League ===
In their first year in the Azadegan League they won the championship, as well as the Hazfi Cup. They won the league championship again in 1994. The team was relegated to the second division in 1995, but was promoted again in the following year. Since their second promotion to the top tier, the club has remained in the middle of the league table.

=== Persian Gulf Pro League ===
==== Ali Daei era ====
By 2001, the club's on-field performance remained stable, occupying mid-table position most years. Shortly following Iranian goalkeeper Ahmad Reza Abedzadeh's retirement, he was linked with the head coaching job at Saipa. It never materialized, but the club signed another Iranian, Ali Daei in a move from Saba Battery. The club had finished third in the previous season and now, with Werner Lorant as coach, the team aimed to work for the title. Shortly after the season began though, Littbarski was fired and Ali Daei took on the role of player/coach. Daei scored the winner in the title winning game. Daei extended his contract, this time as a full-time coach. He was appointed head coach of the national team but kept his role at Saipa until the end of the season.

==== Return to mid-table and relocation to Tehran ====
Following the title winning year which saw the team play in the AFC Champions League, Saipa returned to the mid-table in the league standing. Before the start of the 2015–16 Persian Gulf Pro League season Saipa announced they had moved their home city from Karaj to nearby Tehran.

== Season-by-season ==
The table below chronicles the achievements of Saipa in various competitions since 1993.

Season		Pos.	Hazfi Cup	ACL
1993–94	Azadegan League	1st	Winners	did not qualify
1994–95	Azadegan League	1st		Second round
1995–96	Azadegan League	16th		4th Place
1996–97	Second Division	2nd		did not qualify
1997–98	Azadegan League	7th	Not held	did not qualify
1998–99	Azadegan League	4th		did not qualify
1999–2000	Azadegan League	3rd	Semifinal	did not qualify
2000–01	Azadegan League	7th	Semifinal	did not qualify
2001–02	Pro League	11th		did not qualify
2002–03	Pro League	6th	Quarterfinals	did not qualify
2003–04	Pro League	13th	Semifinal	did not qualify
2004–05	Pro League	13th	Quarterfinals	did not qualify
2005–06	Pro League	3rd	Round of 16	did not qualify
2006–07	Pro League	1st	Quarterfinals	did not qualify
2007–08	Pro League	11th	Round of 16	Quarterfinals
2008–09	Pro League	10th	Round of 16	did not qualify
2009–10	Pro League	8th	Third Round	did not qualify
2010–11	Pro League	11th	Fourth Round	did not qualify
2011–12	Pro League	8th	Round of 16	did not qualify
2012–13	Pro League	9th	Round of 16	did not qualify
2013–14	Pro League	8th	Round of 16	did not qualify
2014–15	Pro League	7th	Round of 16	did not qualify
2015–16	Pro League	8th	Semifinals	did not qualify
2016–17	Pro League	13th	Semifinals	did not qualify
2017–18	Pro League	4th	Round of 16	did not qualify
2018–19	Pro League	7th	Semifinals	Play-off
2019–20	Pro League	14th	Quarterfinals	did not qualify
2020–21	Pro League	15th	Round of 16	did not qualify
2021-22	Azadegan League	14th	Third Round	did not qualify
2022-23	Azadegan League

== Honours ==
- Iran Pro League/First Division
  - Champions: 1993–94*, 1994–95, 2006–07
- Hazfi Cup
  - Winners: 1993–94*
- Tehran Super Cup
  - Champions: 1993
- Tehran Province League
  - Champions: 1992-1993
- ^{*} Won League title and Hazfi Cup (double)

== Players ==
=== Current squad ===
As of 27 January 2025

Note: Flags indicate national team as defined under FIFA eligibility rules; some limited exceptions apply. Players may hold more than one non-FIFA nationality.

No.	Pos.	Nation	Player
1	GK	IRN	Nima Alipour
2	DF	IRN	Moein Ghorbani
4	DF	IRN	Seyed Jalal Abdi
5	DF	IRN	Alireza Khoshkafa
6	MF	IRN	Mahmoud Shafiei
7	MF	IRN	Sadegh Barani
9	FW	IRN	Peyman Ranjbari
10	FW	IRN	Seyed Peyman Miri
11	FW	IRN	Milad Jahani
12	GK	IRN	Erfan Bahri
13	DF	IRN	Majid Ghashghaei
14	MF	IRN	Mehrshad Seydi
15	DF	IRN	Erfan Hassanpour
16	FW	IRN	Mohammadhossein Alipour
18	FW	IRN	Reza Galedar
19	FW	IRN	Ali Sobhani

No.	Pos.	Nation	Player
21	FW	IRN	Amirhossein Yahyazadeh
22	GK	IRN	Alireza Mokarram
23	DF	IRN	Navid Baadab
26	DF	IRN	Mahyar Zahmatkesh
27	FW	IRN	Mehdi Kiani Dehkiani
30	MF	IRN	Mehdi Karbalaei
33	GK	IRN	Mohammadreza Bagheri
35	MF	IRN	Abolfazl Karamollahi
36	DF	IRN	Iliya Kameli
37	MF	IRN	Mehdi Khodayari
40	DF	IRN	Ehsan Joudaki
41	DF	IRN	Yasin Jorjani
66	MF	IRN	Ali Dehghan
77	FW	IRN	Ali Zare
98	GK	IRN	Farzad Tayebipour
99	FW	IRN	Alireza Maleki

=== Out on loan ===
Note: Flags indicate national team as defined under FIFA eligibility rules; some limited exceptions apply. Players may hold more than one non-FIFA nationality.

No.	Pos.	Nation	Player
28	FW	IRN	Amirhossein Amanipour (at Mes Rafsanjan until 30 June 2026)

== Individual Records ==
=== All Top Appearances ===
#	Name	Nationality	Apps
1	Ebrahim Sadeghi	Iran	452
2	Majid Ayoubi	Iran	338
3	Roozbeh Shahalidoost	Iran	254
4	Hamed Shiri	Iran	166
5	Mohsen Khalili	Iran	156
6	Ali Zeinali	Iran	150
7	Omid Sharifinasab	Iran	149
8	Javad Ashtiani	Iran	143
9	Hamed Fallahzadeh	Iran	138
10	Ebrahim Shakouri	Iran	133

=== All Top Scorers ===
#	Name	Nationality	Goals
1	Mohsen Khalili	Iran	62
2	Karim Ansarifard	Iran	56
3	Ebrahim Sadeghi	Iran	41
4	Amin Manouchehri	Iran	25
5	Hamed Shiri	Iran	22
6	Sajjad Shahbazzadeh	Iran	21
7	Mehdi Torabi	Iran	20
8	Javad Kazemian	Iran	16
9	Arman Ramezani	Iran	15
10	Omid Sharifinasab	Iran	14

== Manager ==
=== Coaching staff ===
Staff	Name
Head coach	(Iran) Faraz Kamalvand
First team coach	(Iran) Asghar Maziar
Assistant coach	(Iran) Mehdi Zarei (Iran) Kazem Borjlou
Goalkeeping coach	(Iran) Farshad Bakhtiarizadeh
Fitness coach	(Iran) Ali Asghar GhorbanaliPour
Doctor	(Iran) Mahyar Mortazavi
Analyzer	(Iran) Mohammad Palizvan
Technical Manager	(Iran) Asghar Hajiloo
B team Manager	(Iran) Kianoush Rahmati

The following managers had managed Saipa since 1993:

Name	Period	Trophies
(Iran) Bijan Zolfagharnasab	1993–97	2 Azadegan League, Hazfi Cup
(Iran) Nasrollah Abdollahi	1997–00	
(Iran) Behtash Fariba	2000–01	
(Iran) Hamid Alidoosti	2001–02	
(Italy) Giovanni Mei	2002–03	
(Iran) Mohammad Mayeli Kohan	2003–04	
(Iran) Bijan Zolfagharnasab	2004–06	
(Germany) Werner Lorant	2006	
(Iran) Ali Daei	2006–08	1 Persian Gulf Cup
(Germany) Pierre Littbarski	2008	
(Iran) Mohammad Mayeli Kohan	2008–11	
(Iran) Majid Saleh	2011–12	
(Iran) Mojtaba Taghavi	2012–13	
(Turkey) Engin Firat	2013–14	
(Iran) Majid Jalali	2014–16	
(Iran) Hossein Faraki	2016–17	
(Iran) Ali Daei	2017–19	
(Iran) Ebrahim Sadeghi	2019–21	
(Iran) Faraz Kamalvand	2021	
