= Javad Ashtiani =

Iranian footballer (born 1981)

Personal information
- Full name: Mohammad Javad Ashtiani
- Date of birth: 20 August 1981 (age 45)
- Place of birth: Iran
- Height: 1.76 m (5 ft 9 in)
- Position: Midfielder

Youth career
- –1999: Bank Melli

Senior career*
Years	Team	Apps	(Gls)
2002–2012	Saipa	150	(10)
2012–2013	Shahrdari Arak		

International career
2001	Iran U20	1	(0)
- * Club domestic league appearances and goals

Mohammad Javad Ashtiani (Persian: محمدجواد آشتیانی; born 20 August 1981) is an Iranian former football player.

== Club career ==
Ashtiani has played for Saipa since 2005.

=== Club career statistics ===
Last Update 4 August 2011

Club performance			League		Cup		Continental		Total	
Season	Club	League	Apps	Goals	Apps	Goals	Apps	Goals	Apps	Goals
Iran			League		Hazfi Cup		Asia		Total	
2005–06	Saipa	Pro League	14	1			-	-		
2006–07	Saipa	Pro League	27	2			-	-		
2007–08	Saipa	Pro League	29	4			5	0		
2008–09	Saipa	Pro League	27	3	1	0	-	-	28	3
2009–10	Saipa	Pro League	25	0	1	0	-	-	26	0
2010–11	Saipa	Pro League	13	0	0	0	-	-	13	0
2011–12	Saipa	Pro League	0	0	1	0	-	-	1	0
Career total			135	10			5	0		

- Assist Goals

Season	Team	Assists
09–10	Saipa	3
10–11	Saipa	1
11-12	Saipa	0
