= Amir Hossein Tatari =

Iranian basketball player (born 1988)

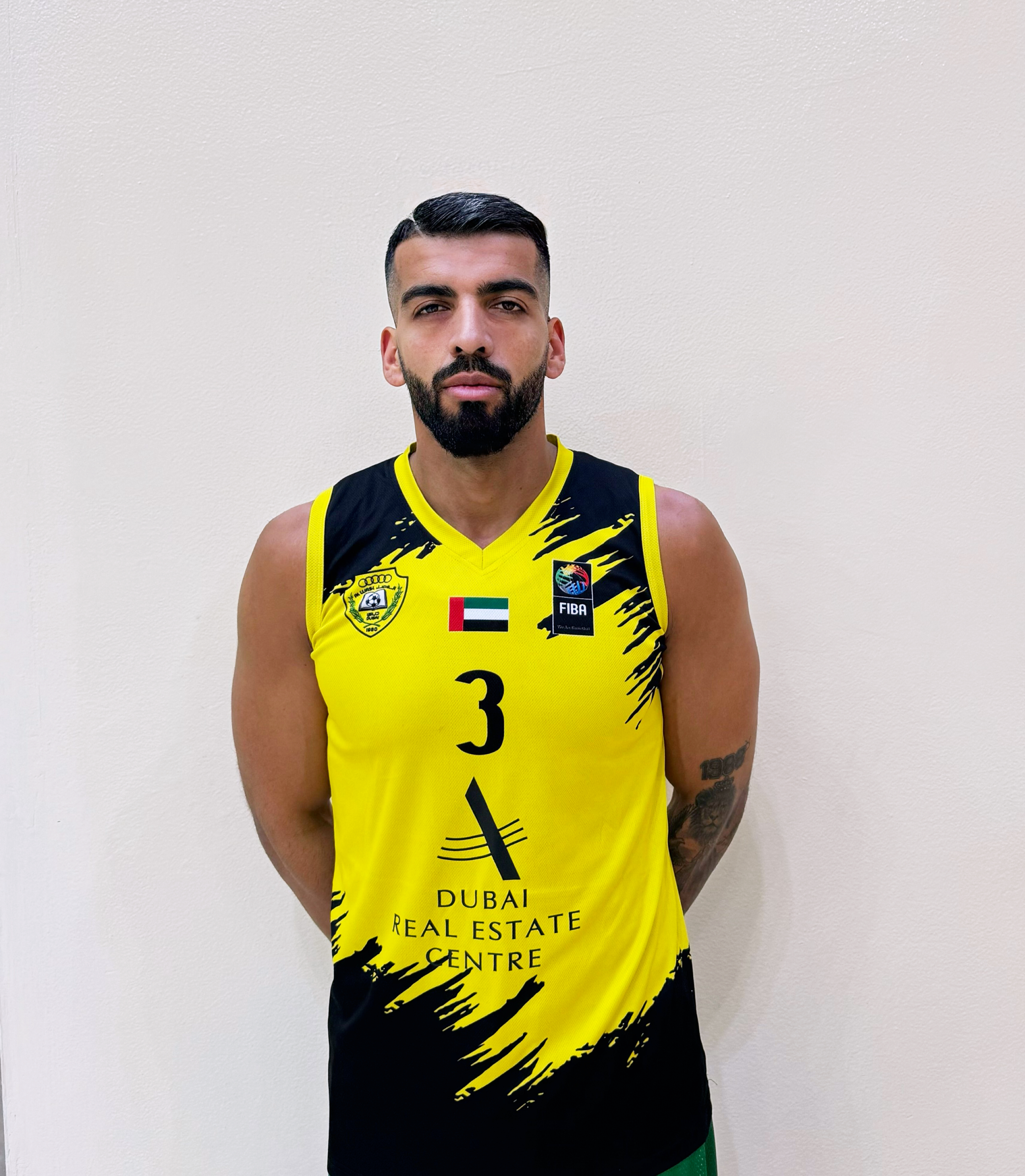

Personal information
- Born: 8 May 1988 (age 37) Mashhad, Iran
- Listed height: 6 ft 7 in (2.01 m)
- Listed weight: 237 lb (108 kg)

Career information
- Playing career: 2010–present
- Position: Forwards

Career history
- 2009-2010: Saba Mehr Qazvin
- 2010-2011: Shahrdari Gorgan
- 2011-2012: Jahesh Tarabar Qom
- 2012-2013: Azad University Tehran
- 2014-2015: Shahrdari Tabriz
- 2015-2016: Samen Mashhad
- 2016-2017: Ayande Sazan Isfahan
- 2017-2018: Naft Abadan
- 2018-2020: Parsa Mashhad
- 2020-2021: Avijeh Sanat Parsa Mashhad

Amir Hossein Tatari (Persian: امیرحسین تاتاری; born 8 May 1988) is an Iranian professional basketball player for Al Wasl of the United Arab Emirates Basketball Association.

He also has a history of playing in Avijeh Sanat Parsa Mashhad, Shahrdari Gorgan and Palayesh Naft Abadan BC teams.

== Other Websites ==
Amir Hossein Tatari on Instagram
