= Amirhossein Kermanshahi =

Iranian actor and model (born 1984)

- امیرحسین کرمانشاهی
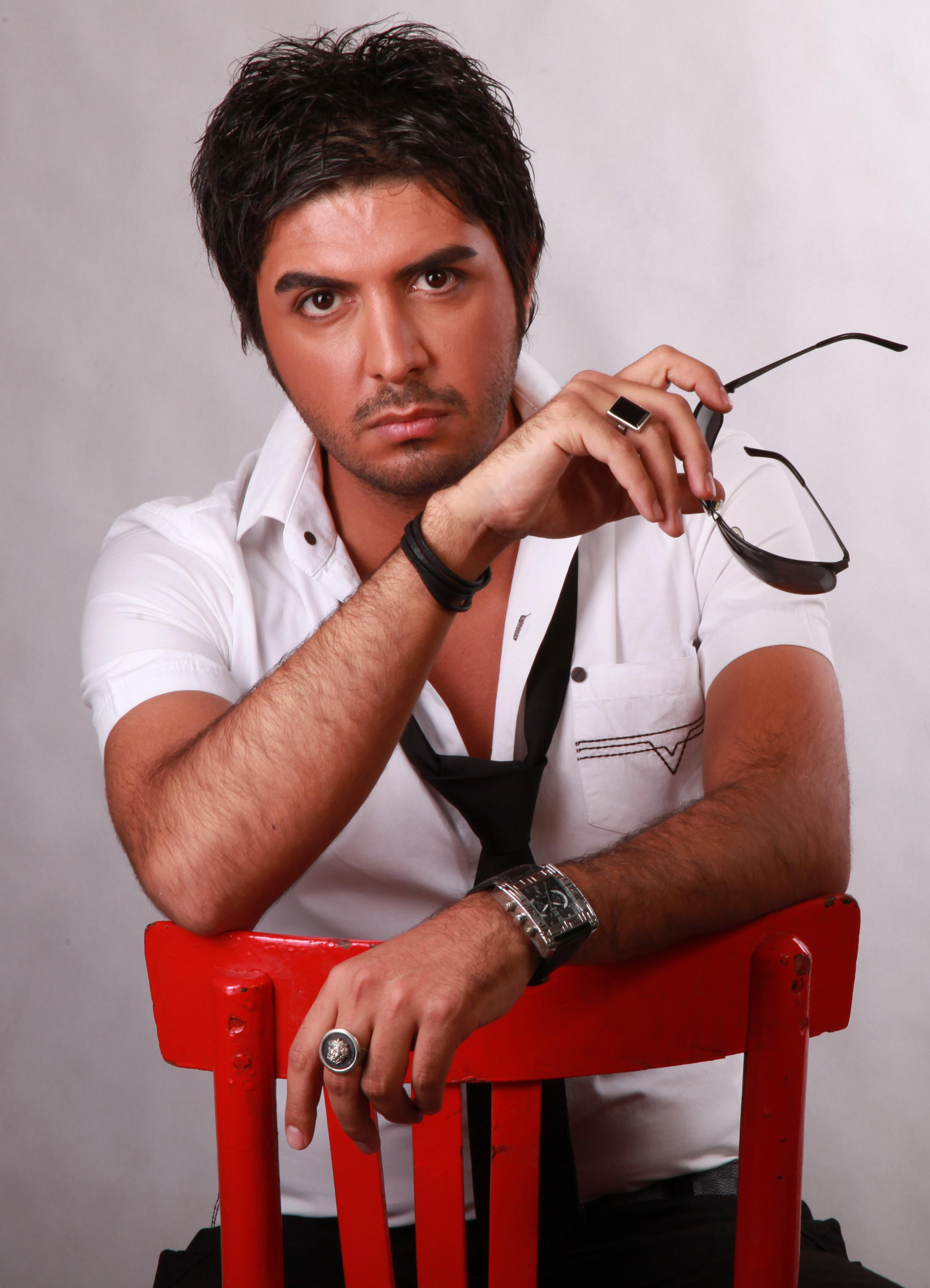
- Born: 12 June 1984 (age 42); Tehran, Iran

Amirhossein Kermanshahi (Persian: امیرحسین کرمانشاهی; born June 12, 1984) is an Iranian actor and photo model. He played in the black intelligence series made by Masoud Abparvar in 2009.

== Filmography ==
- 2009 : Black Intelligence (Director : Masoud Abparvar)
- 2009 : Mareke dar Mareke (Director : Alireza Haghshenas)
- 2010 : Va ... Baraye Zamin (Director : Amirhossein Akbari)
- 2010 : Nowruz (Director : Arad HassanZadeh)
- 2010 : Ghezavat (Director : Mostafa Fatemi)
- 2011 : 125 Mission (Director : Masoud Abparvar)
