= Hamzah Fansuri =

Indonesian writer

Hamzah Fansuri (Jawi: حمزه فنسوري; also spelled Hamzah Pansuri, d. c. 1590 ?) was a 16th-century Sumatran Sufi writer, and the first writer known to write mystical panentheistic ideas in the Malay language. He wrote poetry as well as prose. He has been called the "first Malay poet" and the first known poet to have written in the Malay poetic form syair.

== Life ==
Information on Hamzah's life comes largely from the takhallus bait (pen-name stanza) that ends his poetry (syair), as well as from the work of his disciple Hasan Fansuri and commentaries on Hamzah's poems. However, many of his biographical details are uncertain. His name indicates that he may be from Barus (also known as Fansur to the Arabs), or have spent a large part of his life there. A link to the Siamese Ayutthaya (Shahr-i-Naw) has also been proposed, although it may be that he travelled to Ayutthaya rather than that being his birthplace. He was inducted into a Sufi order and it is thought that he may have worked at the court of the Aceh Sultanate.

Hamzah travelled widely, and was known to have visited the Malay Peninsula, Mughal India, Mecca and Medina, and Baghdad. He was one of the earliest Southeast Asians to have completed the hajj during the early 16th century. The date of his death is generally assumed to be around 1590 or earlier, although a later date during the reign of Sultan Iskandar Muda has also been proposed. However, an inscription on a gravestone found in Mecca for a Shaykh Hamza b. Abd Allah al-Fansuri recorded a date of April 11, 1527, although that identification has been challenged. Such an early date, if confirmed, may suggest that Hamzah did not live or work in Aceh, rather he was in Barus before leaving for Mecca where he died.

== Panentheism ==
Hamzah Fansuri's panentheism was derived from the writings of the medieval Islamic scholars. He was influenced by Ibn Arabi's doctrine of Waḥdat al-Wujūd popular in Persia and Mughal India during the 16th century. Ibn Arabi taught that all reality is one and everything that exists is part of the divine. He perceived God as immanent within all things, including the individual, and sought to unite one's self with the indwelling spirit of God. He employed the doctrine of seven stages of emanation (martabat) in which God manifests Himself in this world, ending in the Perfect Man, a doctrine widespread in Indonesia at the time. His teachings were promoted by Aceh theologian Shamsuddin al-Sumatrani.

However, his views were later deemed heretical by Nuruddin ar-Raniri for not conforming to the Islamic belief that God remained unchanged by His creation. Nuruddin travelled to Aceh and under his influence, the Sultana Taj ul-Alam attempted to eradicate Hamzah's works and name, and his writings were burnt.

== Works ==
The poetry, syair or ruba'i, of Hamzah Fansuri are usually not more than 13-15 stanzas, but some may be up to 21. 32 of his poems have survived, and Hamzah included in each poem his name and information about himself in the last stanza (takhallus bait). Scholars have commented on his technical skill and mastery in his rhymes, the effective blending Arabic words into Malay poetic structure. They also noted a fondness for pun in his works that displays his humour and poetical flair. He also wrote prose, and his three surviving works in prose are:

- Sharab al-'ashiqin ("The Lovers' Beverage")
- Asrar al-'arifin ("The Secrets of the Gnostics")
- Kitab al-Muntahi ("The Adept") – a collection of Arabic and Persian quotations with discussions in Malay.

He was the first writer to write about Sufi doctrines poetically in the Malay language, or indeed any other languages of the Malay archipelago.

== See also ==
- Syed Muhammad Naquib al-Attas
