= Amir Hossein Jahanshahi =

Iranian politician (born 1960)

Amir Hossein Jahanshahi (Persian: امیرحسین جهانشاهی; born 25 September 1960) is an Iranian political activist and businessman. He is the founder of ‘Raha TV" (2012-2014)—an opposition journalist organization based in London.

== Family background ==
The elders of Amir Hossein Jahanshahi’s family belong to the Kara Koyunlu clan which has a 500 year history of governing a number of key provinces in Iran. Based in Tabriz, the ‘Gharghoyonlou’ ruled over significant sectors of contemporary Iran, including Azerbaijan, Khuzestan, Kerman, Fars and Heart as well as parts of present day Iraq. The last ‘Gharghoyonlou’ ruler was Jahan Shah.

A number of personalities from this clan were religious figures [‘Mojtahid’], who were considered as noble and notable figures in Azerbaijan after the 8th century.

Following the establishment of ‘Adliehe Azam’ (Supreme Court) by Nasserdin Shah in the 19th century, these notables became leading members of the state judiciary. Prominent amongst these figures were ‘Mirza Mohammad Taghi Sadr Jahanshahi’ (the uncle of MirzaShafi Jahanshahi) who headed the judiciary in Azarbaijan.

In 1946, Amir Hossein Jahanshahi’s grand father, Mirza Shafi Jahanshahi was appointed as the Head of Iran’s Supreme Court by Prime Minister ََAhmad Ghavam (‘Ghavomol-Saltaneh’). In the course of the elections to the 15th Majles (1947), Mirza Shafi was also the Head of the Supervisory Group for the elections in Teheran. His father, Gholam Hossein Jahanshahi was elected to the 19th (1956) and 20th Majles (1960), as Deputy from Teheran and pursuant to that, in the cabinet of Prime Minister Asadollah Alam in 1962, he was appointed as Minister of Trade. For a while, he also served as Deputy Head of the Pahlavi Foundation (Persian:بنیاد پهلوی).

His Maternal Grand Father was Khaz'al al-Ka'bi who was the governor of Khuzestan Province in the early 1920s.

== Business career ==
Amir Hossein Jahanshahi completed his education in France where he obtained degrees in Economics at the Panthéon-Assas University. Subsequent to completing his studies, he worked as a financial advisor and as a real estate developer in Paris, Madrid and Barcelona, before becoming a major stakeholder in large public companies such as Bouygues, Havas and Vivendi.

== Political career ==
Concerned adamantly about the rapid rise of radical fundamentalism in Iran and the Middle East, which he believes places the prospects of its future generations in serious jeopardy, his first book entitled, "Defeating the Third Totalitarianism" was published in December 2001 in the aftermath of ‘9/11’ attack on the World Trade Center in New York. The publication of his first book was followed by a series of articles published in major French newspapers and leading to the publication of his second book in September 2009, entitled "The Iranian Hitler – Putting anEnd to Ahmadinejad’s Dictatorship"

A message published by the French newspaper, Le Figaro in October 2009, calling on all Iranian opposition groups - inside and outside the country as well as those within the governing regime – to be prepared to work with one another in a united effort to overthrow the ‘Ahmadinejad regime’, marked the official entrance of Jahanshahi into the political fray.

In March 2010, Amir Hossein Jahanshahi launched Green Wave with a new political agenda committed to serving the Iranian nation and preventing regional war and instability.

== Iranian TV Documentaries Concerning Jahanshahi and Green Wave ==
Jahanshahi and Green Wave soon became the main targets of the Iranian state’s propaganda machine in the administration of Mahmoud Ahmadinejad. Worried about activities pursued by Jahanshahi’s innovative outlook, commitment and dedication for achieving his objectives, in an unprecedented move not seen before, the Iranian State Television in 2011-2013 produced a total of three separate documentaries (‘Almase Farib’ I & II, 2011 and 2012) and (‘Triangle’, 2013) to directly damage and derail the activities of Green Wave in order to foil its activities aimed at promoting popular change in Iran and ending the scourge of radical fundamentalism in the region and beyond.

== The Launch of ‘Raha TV’ ==
In September 2012, Amir Hossein Jahanshahi launched the first major opposition TV channel in London. ‘Raha’ (‘to free’) is dedicated to ‘change’ and is run by Iranian journalists who have recently left Iran as well as some working inside the country.

At Raha’s official launch in October 2012, Jahanshahi stated that "At this critical juncture in the history of Iran and the region people will want to watch in order to get news and analysis that they can trust as unbiased". However, because ‘Raha TV’ poses a major challenge to policies carried out by hardliners and extremists within the ruling establishment, some of its transmissions have been subject to blockage though these activities have at no time deterred ‘Raha’ from overcoming these obstacles and getting its message to the Iranian people.

== National Reconciliation and Economic Reconstruction ==
In line with his consistent concern that political change should never be sought at a cost of either subjecting the country to the threat of a destructive external military conflict or a situation of internal mayhem and civil war, Amir Hossein Jahanshahi supported the candidacy of Hassan Rouhani in the presidential election of June 2013, using all his various resources both inside and outside Iran. Later, on 26 September 2013, following the publication of a ‘Full Page Message’ printed in the International Herald Tribune (coinciding with the presence of Iranian President Hassan Rouhani at the General Assembly of the UN), he advanced a new initiative aimed at promoting ‘national reconciliation’ amongst contending factions that wish to retain centuries old traditions and the youth who are seeking a modern and progressive Iran.

Amir-Hossein Jahanshahi has emphasized the future advancement of the Iranian people and Iran’s restoration to a prominent position within the international community, consistent with its historical legacy and civilization. He has also highlighted economic reconstruction as essential to national prosperity and to the establishment of a democratic and just political order in Iran.

Placing ‘economic reconstruction’ at the top of all priorities, Jahanshahi has sought the cooperation of those anxious to retain the status quo and those committed to the construction of a different Iran, to come together with the explicit eventual aim of establishing reconciliation between civil society and government for the sake of restoring Iran’s damaged economic and social structures, thus allowing it to attain its rightful place amongst the top ten economies of the world within a single decade.

=== Inviting ‘Real Madrid’ to Iran ===
In the aftermath of his call for ‘National Reconciliation’, at his behest on the birthday of the ‘Prophet of Islam’ (in 2014), his close friend, the president of the ‘Real Madrid’ football club, in what was widely covered by the Iranian media, accepted his proposal to enter into direct into negotiations with the appropriate Iranian authorities, so that the European Club Champions may visit Iran and play a friendly match against the popular Iranian side Persepolis F.C. for the benefit of the Iranian people.

=== Return to Iran ===
In order to implement the much need reconstruction of the Iranian economy, as well as securing some of the country’s most immediate vital requirements for the promotion of such a mission, in an interview with the French daily, Le Figaro on 7 February 2014, Amir Hossein Jahanshahi announced that he was willing to return to Iran without any precondition so that this important ‘national mission could be pursued with the Iranian people. He said that Iran belonged to all Iranians and relieving the hardships placed on the lives of all citizens while securing the country’s immediate needs was a critical requirement. According to Jahanshahi, preventing the kind of violence and social and economic catastrophes witnessed in countries like Syria, Afghanistan, Iraq and Egypt was a key priority and, as such, it was the duty for all Iranians who wanted to see their country restore its pride, dignity and former greatness.

=== ‘BAAM’, an umbrella for supporting economic reconstruction and national reconciliation in Iran ===
In the course of a press conference held in Paris on 20 November 2014, Amir Hossein Jahanshahi announced that he would be ending his 35 years of exile and returning to Iran no later than Spring 2015. He said, In line with my natural obligations given these new circumstances, it is my intention that all my activities should be conducted in a framework that is in compliance with the laws of our country".In a subsequent statement released in the aftermath of the Press Conference held on 20 November, on 8 December 2014, he announced that in light of these developments, Dr. Mehrdad Khonsari, the Secretary General of ‘Green Wave’, had, therefore suggested the dissolution of Green Wave, which he had accepted. Amir Hossein Jahanshahi, having at the same time announced the creation of the newly established Organization for ‘Economic Reconstruction and National Reconciliation’ (‘BAAM"), said that he had invited Dr. Mehrdad Khonsari to become the Secretary General of the new organization. This organization is to serve as an umbrella for providing support for economic reconstruction and national reconciliation in a framework that is in compliance with the laws of the country.

=== Broadcasts by Raha TV to Iran come to an end ===
In a statement released by his office on 19 December 2014, Amir Hossein Jahanshahi announced that in conjunction with his decision for returning to Iran and conducting his activities in compliance with the laws of the country, the activities of Raha TV would cease at the end of 2014. Having said that three years before, Raha TV had been established as a fully independent and free Iranian media channel in the field of 'news and analysis', Jahanshahi expressed the hope that conclusion at this point will spark the start of a new beginning so that this television station might resume its activities at a time of economic development and prosperity and in compliance with the laws of Iran.
