= Amirhossein Yahyazadeh =

Iranian footballer (born 1998)

Personal information
- Date of birth: 17 February 1998 (age 28)
- Place of birth: Babolsar, Iran
- Height: 1.77 m (5 ft 9 1/2 in)
- Position: Winger

Team information
- Current team: Saipa
- Number: 21

Youth career
- 2015–2017: Khoneh Be Khoneh

Senior career*
Years	Team	Apps	(Gls)
2017–2018	Khoneh Be Khoneh	1	(0)
2018	Naft Novin	3	(0)
2018–2019	Pars Jam	3	(0)
2019–2020	Rayka Babol	24	(5)
2020–2021	Nassaji	3	(0)
2021–2023	Malavan	31	(3)
2023	Mes Kerman	2	(0)
2023–2024	Mes Shahr-e Babak	15	(1)
2024–	Saipa	19	(1)

International career^{‡}
2014	Iran U17	3	(0)
- * Club domestic league appearances and goals as of 22 April 2025 ‡ National team caps and goals as of 17 December 2014

Amirhossein Yahyazadeh (Persian: امیرحسین یحیی‌زاده; born 17 February 1998) is an Iranian footballer who plays as a winger for Saipa in the Azadegan League.

== Club career ==
=== Naft Tehran ===
He made his debut for Naft Tehran in 21 fixtures of the 2017–18 Iran Pro League against Gostaresh Foulad.
