= Al Taqwa Mosque =

Mosque in Kuala Lumpur, Malaysia

- Masjid Al Taqwa

Religion
- Affiliation: Sunni Islam

Location
- Location: Taman Tun Dr Ismail, Kuala Lumpur, Malaysia
- Interactive map of Al Taqwa Mosque
- Coordinates: 3°8′46″N 101°37′47″E

Architecture
- Type: Mosque

The Al Taqwa Mosque (Malay: Masjid Al Taqwa) is a mosque in Taman Tun Dr Ismail, Kuala Lumpur, Malaysia.

== See also ==
- Islam in Malaysia
- GoogleMaps StreetView of Masjid At-Taqwa, Kuala Lumpur
