= Amirhossein Sahebkar =

- امیرحسین صاحبکار
- Education: Mashhad University of Medical Sciences (PharmD, PhD)
- Scientific career
- Fields: Medical biotechnology, cardiovascular disease
- Workplaces: Mashhad University of Medical Sciences

Amirhossein Sahebkar is an Iranian biotechnologist specializing in cardiovascular diseases. He is a faculty member in the department of medical biotechnology at the Mashhad University of Medical Sciences.

== Life ==
Sahebkar completed a professional doctorate in pharmacy (Pharm.D.) in 2008 from Mashhad University of Medical Sciences. Sahebkar earned a Ph.D. in pharmaceutical biotechnology from the Mashhad University of Medical Sciences. He has completed fellowship careers in cardiometabolic diseases at the University of Western Australia, International Atherosclerosis Society, and Mashhad University of Medical Sciences. He is a fellow of the European Society of Cardiology and American College of Cardiology, and serves as the National Lead Investigator for the European Atherosclerosis Society. He is also an adjunct professor of universities outside of Iran. His primary research focus lies in basic and clinical studies aimed at developing novel therapeutic strategies for cardiometabolic diseases. He has been selected by Clarivate Analytics among global top 1% highly cited researches across different scientific fields.

Sahebkar is a Professor in the department of medical biotechnology at the Mashhad University of Medical Sciences. His research focuses on cardiovascular disease, atherosclerosis, and blood lipids. He is a member of the Iran's National Elites Foundation. In 2016, he was presented the Professor Dr. Fereydoun Azizi award by the Iranian Academy of Medical Sciences. He has also been awarded several national and international awards, and holds Adjunct Professor positions at universities outside of Iran.

As of April 2026, Sahebkar has co-authored more than 2000 PubMed-indexed articles, of which 11 have been retracted. Five of those retractions are due to irregularities at the publisher Hindawi, where an investigation discovered more than 7000 articles with "systematic manipulation of the publication and peer-review process" and / or potentially connected to paper mills. Six further retractions are due to data and / or image irregularities.
