= International Institute of Islamic Thought and Civilisation =

Higher education institution in Malaysia

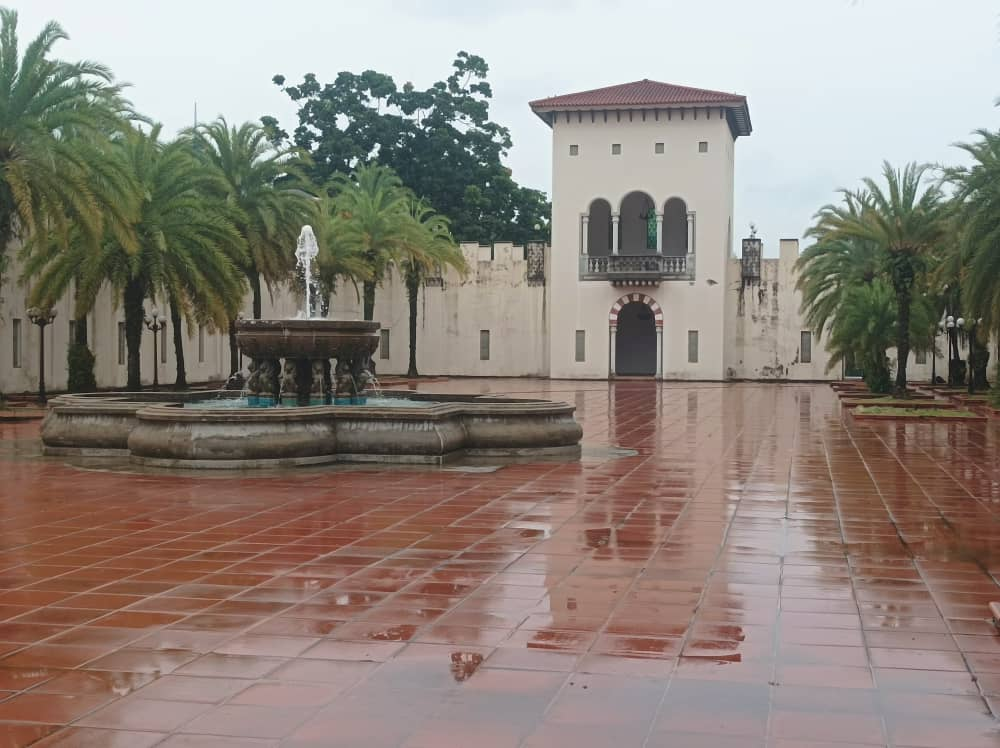
- ISTAC, November 2025
- Other names: ISTAC; ISTAC-IIUM
- Former names: Ibn Khaldun International Institute of Advanced Research; International Institute of Islamic Civilization and Malay World (2017–2019)
- Established: 29 September 1987; 39 years ago
- Founder: Syed Muhammad Naquib al-Attas
- Parent institution: International Islamic University Malaysia
- Location: Kuala Lumpur, Malaysia; 3.1659049°N 101.6741484°E
- Campus: Persiaran Tuanku Syed Sirajuddin, Bukit Tunku
- Website: institute.iium.edu.my/istac/

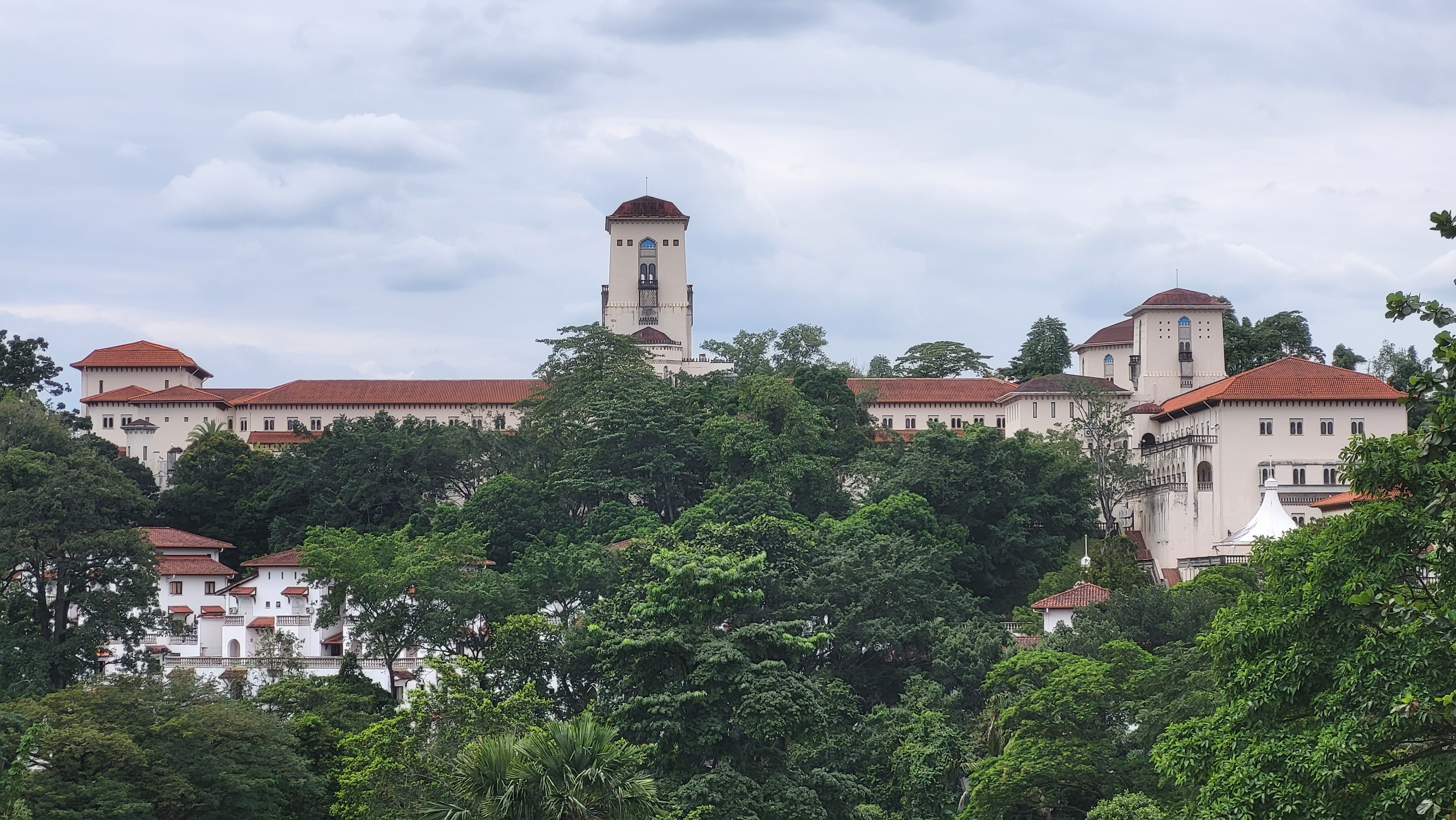
The institute as seen from Bukit Tunku in 2026

The International Institute of Islamic Thought and Civilisation (ISTAC or ISTAC – IIUM; Malay: Institut Pemikiran dan Tamadun Islam Antarabangsa; Arabic: المعهد الدولي للفكر والحضارة الإسلامية; briefly known as Ibn Khaldun International Institute of Advanced Research and International Institute of Islamic Civilization and Malay World) is a postgraduate institute in the International Islamic University Malaysia (IIUM).

Founded in 1987 by Syed Muhammad Naquib al-Attas, ISTAC is an Islamic research institute that is dedicated towards engaging in advanced-level study and research about Islamic thought and civilisation at the national and global levels, with the goal to nurture comparative, cultural, and civilisational studies that is devoted to the renewal of Islam and human civilisation. The institute is located at Taman Duta, Kuala Lumpur, about 20 kilometers from the main campus of IIUM in Gombak, Selangor.

== History ==
In 1987, Syed Muhammad Naquib al-Attas was given full authority to develop ISTAC as a research center affiliated with the IIUM. ISTAC was established through the approval of Council Meeting No. 14 on 29 September the same year to develop knowledge studies based on an Islamic perspective as outlined in the IIUM Constitution, while played a role in fostering discussions on Islamic thought and civilization.

In the initial stages, ISTAC operated as an autonomous entity based on the ISTAC Rules and Regulations 1989. The opening ceremony was held on 4 October 1991 by Mahathir Mohamad, the then 4th Prime Minister. The institute is also listed in international directories as an independent research institution.

In 2002, ISTAC's autonomy within the university structure was withdrawn and Al-Attas' contract as director was not renewed. This move led to a change in the administrative and operational direction of the institute.

On 25 February 2015, Council Meeting No. 106 approved the transfer of the ISTAC program to the Kulliyyah of Islamic Revealed Knowledge and Human Sciences (KIRKHS) starting Semester 1 of the 2015/2016 sessions. The process involves the transfer of personnel, documents, artifacts and the preparation of new operating space. In the same year, ISTAC was effectively closed after its academic programs were absorbed into KIRKHS.

A new institute, the Ibn Khaldun International Institute for Advanced Research (ISLAH), was established as a successor, although it no longer maintained the original orientation developed by Al-Attas.

In 2017, the institute reopened and was rebranded as the International Institute of Islamic Civilization and the Malay World on 26 October, but reverted to its original name as ISTAC on 17 May 2019 upon the decision from the Board of Governors Meeting No. 53.

== See also ==
- Islamization of knowledge

== Sources ==
- Waardenburg, Jacques (1998). "Observations on the Scholarly Study of Religions as Pursued in Some Muslim Countries". Numen. 45 (3): 237. doi:10.1163/1568527981562177. ISSN 0029-5973. JSTOR 3270422.
