= Amir Hossein Ardebili =

Iranian businessman (born 1975)

- Born: 1975 (age 50–51)
- Education: University of Shiraz
- Occupation: Businessman
- Employer: Shiraz Electronic Industries
- Status: Served, and deported
- Criminal charge: Arms dealing
- Penalty: 5 years imprisonment

Amir Hossein Ardebili is an Iranian businessman and convicted arms dealer.

== Early life and career ==
Ardebili was born in 1975 and grew up in Shiraz, Iran. He attended the University of Shiraz, where he studied electrical engineering. His father worked for a municipal tax authority and his mother was a homemaker. Ardebili worked for an Iranian government front company called Shiraz Electronic Industries as an acquisition agent before starting his own company, SBC Technology Group. His business objective was to acquire weapons components and technology for Iran from the west, and primarily the United States, through a front company in Dubai.

== Undercover Investigation and Arrest ==
A team from the Department of Justice, Homeland Security Investigations, and the Defense Criminal Investigative Service targeted Ardebili, starting in 2004, based on information provided by an informant. Ardebili sent thousands of requests for quotation for electronic and weapons components to a United States (U.S.) undercover storefront operating in the U.S. and in Europe. The U.S. undercover investigation culminated in face to face meetings between Ardebili and federal agents on October 1 and October 2, 2007, in Tbilisi, Republic of Georgia.

During the investigation, Ardebili negotiated the purchase and illegal export to Iran of a number of military components, including: QRS-11 Gyro Chip Sensors, which are used in numerous advanced aircraft, missile, space and commercial applications; MAPCGM0003 Phase Shifters, which perform a key function in electronically steered antennae and have many applications including phased array radar, used in military target acquisition and missile guidance; and Digital Air Data Computer, which is a replacement for the computer installed on the U.S. F-4 fighter aircraft used by Iran that calculates flight parameters including altitude, air speed, static pressure, mach number, and true angle of attack.

During the undercover meetings, Ardebili stated he was interested in acquiring components for nuclear weapons. When asked by an undercover agent why Iran was trying to acquire such a broad range of military technology and equipment, Ardebili said, “They think the war is coming.”

After the undercover meetings in Tbilisi, Ardebili was arrested by Georgian officials and held for extradition, which occurred in January 2008.

== Guilty Plea and Sentencing ==
Ardebili was indicted in the United States and charged with offenses relating to the export of weapons components and technology to Iran. On May 19, 2008. Ardebili pleaded guilty to multiple violations of the Arms Export Control Act, International Emergency Economic Powers Act, smuggling, conspiracy and money laundering. On December 14, 2009, Ardebili was sentenced to five years in prison. He completed his prison term in February 2012 and was deported to Iran on March 14, 2012.

== Additional resources ==
- John Shiffman, Operation Shakespeare: The True Story of an Elite International Sting, Simon and Schuster. Operation Shakespeare
- Inventive U.S. Sting Operation Catches Iran-Based Military Equipment Smuggler
- Shadow War: The magic show
- The fake company that busted an Iranian arms dealer | CNN
- The art of going undercover | CNN
